= 2015 Davis Cup Americas Zone Group I =

International tennis competition

The Americas Zone is one of the three zones of regional Davis Cup competition in 2015.

In the Americas Zone there are three different groups in which teams compete against each other to advance to the next group.

== Participating nations ==
Seeds:

1. Colombia
2. Ecuador

Remaining Nations:

- Barbados
- Dominican Republic
- Uruguay

=== Draw ===
Second round play-offs
Saint Michael, Barbados (hard)
Uruguay	2
Barbados	3

First round play-offs
bye
Uruguay
Saint Michael, Barbados (hard)
Barbados	2
Ecuador	3

First round
1	Colombia
bye
Uruguay
bye
Saint Michael, Barbados (hard)
Barbados	2
Dominican Republic	3
bye
2	Ecuador

Second round
Montevideo, Uruguay (clay)
1	Colombia	3
Uruguay	2
Santo Domingo, Dominican Republic (clay)
Dominican Republic	3
2	Ecuador	2

- Uruguay relegated to Group II in 2016.
- Colombia and Dominican Republic advance to World Group Play-off.

== First round ==
=== Barbados vs. Dominican Republic ===
Barbados
2
National Tennis Centre, Saint Michael, Barbados
6–8 March 2015
Hard

Dominican Republic
3

			1	2	3	4	5
1	(Barbados) (Dominican Republic)	Seanon Williams; Víctor Estrella Burgos	1; 6	1; 6	1; 6
2	(Barbados) (Dominican Republic)	Darian King; José Hernández	6; 1	6; 3	6; 0
3	(Barbados) (Dominican Republic)	Darian King / Haydn Lewis; Víctor Estrella Burgos / José Hernández	6; 4	6; 2	6; 2
4	(Barbados) (Dominican Republic)	Darian King; Víctor Estrella Burgos	4; 6	4; 6	2; 6
5	(Barbados) (Dominican Republic)	Haydn Lewis; José Hernández	7; 5	1; 6	2; 6	2; 6

== Second round ==
=== Uruguay vs. Colombia ===
Uruguay
2
Carrasco Lawn Tennis Club, Montevideo, Uruguay
6–8 March 2015
Clay

Colombia
3

			1	2	3	4	5
1	(Uruguay) (Colombia)	Pablo Cuevas; Alejandro González	6; 2	4; 6	6; 4	1; 6	4; 6
2	(Uruguay) (Colombia)	Martín Cuevas; Santiago Giraldo	6^{1} 7^{7}	6; 3	3; 6	3; 6
3	(Uruguay) (Colombia)	Martín Cuevas / Pablo Cuevas; Juan Sebastián Cabal / Robert Farah	6; 4	3; 6	7^{7} 6^{1}	6; 4
4	(Uruguay) (Colombia)	Pablo Cuevas; Santiago Giraldo	6; 2	6; 3	6; 3
5	(Uruguay) (Colombia)	Martín Cuevas; Alejandro González	4; 6	3; 6	1; 6

=== Dominican Republic vs. Ecuador ===
Dominican Republic
3
Santo Domingo Tennis Club, Santo Domingo, Dominican Republic
17–19 July 2015
Clay

Ecuador
2

			1	2	3	4	5
1	(Dominican Republic) (Ecuador)	Víctor Estrella Burgos; Iván Endara	3; 6	6; 2	4; 6	6; 2	6; 4
2	(Dominican Republic) (Ecuador)	José Hernández; Gonzalo Escobar	2; 6	4; 6	3; 6
3	(Dominican Republic) (Ecuador)	Víctor Estrella Burgos / José Hernández; Emilio Gómez / Roberto Quiroz	6; 3	4; 6	6; 3	6; 4
4	(Dominican Republic) (Ecuador)	Víctor Estrella Burgos; Gonzalo Escobar	4; 6	7^{7} 6^{3}	6; 2	6; 0
5	(Dominican Republic) (Ecuador)	Roberto Cid; Emilio Gómez	2; 6	4; 6

== First round playoffs ==
=== Barbados vs. Ecuador ===
Barbados
2
National Tennis Centre, Saint Michael, Barbados
18–20 September
Hard

Ecuador
3

			1	2	3	4	5
1	(Barbados) (Ecuador)	Darian King; Iván Endara	6; 4	6; 4	6; 2
2	(Barbados) (Ecuador)	Haydn Lewis; Emilio Gómez	1; 6	6^{1} 7^{7}	4; 6
3	(Barbados) (Ecuador)	Darian King / Russell Moseley; Gonzalo Escobar / Emilio Gómez	3; 6	4; 6	1; 6
4	(Barbados) (Ecuador)	Darian King; Emilio Gómez	7; 5	7^{7} 6^{3}	6; 1
5	(Barbados) (Ecuador)	Seanon Williams; Gonzalo Escobar	2; 6	1; 6	0; 6

== Second round playoffs ==
=== Barbados vs. Uruguay ===
Barbados
3
National Tennis Centre, Saint Michael, Barbados
30 October–1 November
Hard

Uruguay
2

			1	2	3	4	5
1	(Barbados) (Uruguay)	Seanon Williams; Santiago Maresca	2; 6	2; 6	1; 6
2	(Barbados) (Uruguay)	Darian King; Rodrigo Arús	6; 1	6; 3	3; 6	6; 1
3	(Barbados) (Uruguay)	Darian King / Haydn Lewis; Rodrigo Arús / Santiago Maresca	6; 2	6; 2	6; 2
4	(Barbados) (Uruguay)	Darian King; Santiago Maresca	7^{8} 6^{6}	6; 2	6; 0
5	(Barbados) (Uruguay)	Russell Moseley; Nicolás Xiviller	1; 6	4; 6
