= 2016 Davis Cup Americas Zone Group I =

International tennis competition

The Americas Zone was one of the three zones of the regional Davis Cup competition in 2016.

In the Americas Zone there were three different tiers, called groups, in which teams competed against each other to advance to the upper tier. Winners in Group I advanced to the World Group play-offs, along with losing teams from the World Group first round. Teams who lost their respective ties competed in the relegation play-offs, with winning teams remaining in Group I, whereas teams who lost their play-offs were relegated to the Americas Zone Group II in 2017.

== Participating nations ==
Seeds: All seeds received a bye into the second round.

1. Brazil
2. Colombia

Remaining nations:

- Barbados
- Chile
- Dominican Republic
- Ecuador

=== Draw ===
Second Round Play-offs
Santo Domingo Este, Dominican Republic (hard)
Barbados	2
Dominican Republic	3

First Round Play-offs
bye
Barbados
Santiago de los Caballeros, Dominican Republic (clay)
Dominican Republic	1
2	Colombia	4

First Round
1	Brazil
bye
Portoviejo, Ecuador (clay)
Barbados	0
Ecuador	5
Santiago, Chile (clay)
Chile	5
Dominican Republic	0
bye
2	Colombia

Second Round
Belo Horizonte, Brazil (indoor hard)
1	Brazil	3
Ecuador	1
Iquique, Chile (clay)
Chile	3
2	Colombia	1

- Barbados relegated to Group II in 2017.
- Brazil and Chile advance to World Group Play-off.

== First round ==
=== Ecuador vs. Barbados ===
Ecuador
5
Portoviejo Tennis Club, Portoviejo, Ecuador
4–6 March
Clay

Barbados
0

			1	2	3	4	5
1	(Ecuador) (Barbados)	Emilio Gómez; Adam Hornby	6; 0	6; 0	6; 0
2	(Ecuador) (Barbados)	Iván Endara; Darian King	6; 1	6; 2	6; 4
3	(Ecuador) (Barbados)	Emilio Gómez / Giovanni Lapentti; Darian King / Haydn Lewis	6; 4	6^{7} 7^{9}	6; 2	6; 3
4	(Ecuador) (Barbados)	Emilio Gómez; Seanon Williams	6; 0	6; 2
5	(Ecuador) (Barbados)	Iván Endara; Adam Hornby	6; 0	6; 1

=== Chile vs. Dominican Republic ===
Chile
5
Estadio Nacional Julio Martínez Prádanos, Santiago, Chile
4–6 March
Clay

Dominican Republic
0

			1	2	3	4	5
1	(Chile) (Dominican Republic)	Hans Podlipnik; José Olivares	6; 1	6; 1	7^{7} 6^{4}
2	(Chile) (Dominican Republic)	Gonzalo Lama; José Hernández	6; 3	7^{7} 6^{3}	7; 5
3	(Chile) (Dominican Republic)	Julio Peralta / Hans Podlipnik; Manuel Castellanos / José Hernández	6; 1	6; 1	7; 5
4	(Chile) (Dominican Republic)	Christian Garín; Manuel Castellanos	6; 1	6; 2
5	(Chile) (Dominican Republic)	Gonzalo Lama; José Olivares	6; 4	6; 0

== Second round ==
=== Brazil vs. Ecuador ===
Brazil
3
Arena Minas Tênis Clube, Belo Horizonte, Brazil
15–17 July
Hard (i)

Ecuador
1

			1	2	3	4	5
1	(Brazil) (Ecuador)	Rogério Dutra Silva; Emilio Gómez	6; 4	5; 7	0; 6	4; 6
2	(Brazil) (Ecuador)	Thomaz Bellucci; Roberto Quiroz	7; 5	7^{7} 6^{3}	3; 6	6; 3
3	(Brazil) (Ecuador)	Marcelo Melo / Bruno Soares; Emilio Gómez / Roberto Quiroz	6^{4} 7^{7}	6; 3	6; 3	6; 2
4	(Brazil) (Ecuador)	Thomaz Bellucci; Emilio Gómez	7^{13} 6^{11}	6^{6} 7^{8}	6; 2	7; 5
5	(Brazil) (Ecuador)	Rogério Dutra Silva; Roberto Quiroz						not played

=== Chile vs. Colombia ===
Chile
3
Centro Recreacional de Ejercito Huayquique, Iquique, Chile
15–17 July
Clay

Colombia
1

			1	2	3	4	5
1	(Chile) (Colombia)	Nicolás Jarry; Santiago Giraldo	2; 6	4; 6	3; 6
2	(Chile) (Colombia)	Gonzalo Lama; Alejandro González	6; 2	7; 5	6; 0
3	(Chile) (Colombia)	Nicolás Jarry / Hans Podlipnik; Juan Sebastián Cabal / Robert Farah	6; 4	2; 6	6; 2	6^{4} 7^{7}	7^{7} 6^{5}
4	(Chile) (Colombia)	Gonzalo Lama; Santiago Giraldo	6; 4	5; 2				retired
5	(Chile) (Colombia)	Nicolás Jarry; Alejandro González						not played

== First round playoffs ==
=== Dominican Republic vs. Colombia ===
Dominican Republic
1
Centro Español Inc, Santiago de los Caballeros, Dominican Republic
16–18 September
Clay

Colombia
4

			1	2	3	4	5
1	(Dominican Republic) (Colombia)	Víctor Estrella Burgos; Alejandro González	6; 4	1; 6	6; 3	6; 4
2	(Dominican Republic) (Colombia)	José Hernández; Santiago Giraldo	3; 6	4; 6	4; 6
3	(Dominican Republic) (Colombia)	Víctor Estrella Burgos / José Hernández; Robert Farah / Eduardo Struvay	6; 3	3; 6	4; 6	4; 6
4	(Dominican Republic) (Colombia)	Víctor Estrella Burgos; Santiago Giraldo	5; 7	5; 7	0; 2			retired
5	(Dominican Republic) (Colombia)	Roberto Cid; Alejandro González	2; 6	6; 2	3; 6

== Second round playoffs ==
=== Dominican Republic vs. Barbados ===
Dominican Republic
3
Centro Nacional De Tenis Parque Del Este, Santo Domingo Este, Dominican Republic
28–30 October
Hard

Barbados
2

			1	2	3	4	5
1	(Dominican Republic) (Barbados)	José Hernández; Darian King	3; 6	5; 7	1; 6
2	(Dominican Republic) (Barbados)	Víctor Estrella Burgos; Haydn Lewis	6; 2	6; 1	7^{11} 6^{9}
3	(Dominican Republic) (Barbados)	Víctor Estrella Burgos / José Hernández; Darian King / Haydn Lewis	6; 4	6; 3	2; 6	7^{8} 6^{6}
4	(Dominican Republic) (Barbados)	Víctor Estrella Burgos; Darian King	6^{7} 7^{9}	1; 6	1; 6
5	(Dominican Republic) (Barbados)	José Hernández; Haydn Lewis	6; 4	6; 2	4; 6	6; 4
