= 2010 Davis Cup Americas Zone Group IV =

International tennis competition

The Americas Zone was one of the three zones of the regional Davis Cup competition in 2010.

In the Americas Zone there were four different tiers, called groups, in which teams competed against each other to advance to the upper tier. The five teams in Group IV played in a single Round-robin tournament . The top two teams were promoted to the Americas Zone Group III in 2011. All other teams remained in Group IV.

== Draw ==
- Venue: Panama City, Panama (outdoor clay)
- Date: 29 June - 3 July

| Team | Pld | W | L | MF | MA | Pts |
|---|---|---|---|---|---|---|
| Barbados | 4 | 4 | 0 | 9 | 3 | 4 |
| Honduras | 4 | 3 | 1 | 8 | 4 | 3 |
| Panama | 4 | 2 | 2 | 6 | 6 | 2 |
| Trinidad and Tobago | 4 | 1 | 3 | 5 | 7 | 1 |
| U.S. Virgin Islands | 4 | 0 | 4 | 2 | 10 | 0 |

Barbados and Honduras promoted to Group III for 2011.

== Results ==
=== Panama vs. US Virgin Islands ===
Panama
2
Panama City, Panama
29 June 2010
Clay

U.S. Virgin Islands
1

| | | | 1 | 2 | 3 |
|---|---|---|---|---|---|
| 1 | (Panama) (United States Virgin Islands) | Chadd Valdes; Kristepher Elien | 6; 2 | 2; 6 | 1; 6 |
| 2 | (Panama) (United States Virgin Islands) | Alberto González; Nicholas Bass | 6; 1 | 6; 1 |
| 3 | (Panama) (United States Virgin Islands) | Alberto González / Juan Miguel González; Kristepher Elien / Terrance Eugene Highfield | 6; 4 | 7; 5 |

=== Panama vs. Honduras ===
Panama
1
Panama City, Panama
30 June 2010
Clay

Honduras
2

| | | | 1 | 2 | 3 |
|---|---|---|---|---|---|
| 1 | (Panama) (Honduras) | Juan Miguel González; Calton Álvarez | 3; 6 | 2; 6 |
| 2 | (Panama) (Honduras) | Alberto González; José Moncada | 7; 5 | 7^{7} 6^{5} |
| 3 | (Panama) (Honduras) | Juan Miguel González / Chadd Valdes; Calton Álvarez / José Moncada | 2; 6 | 4; 6 |

=== US Virgin Islands vs. Trinidad & Tobago ===
U.S. Virgin Islands
1
Panama City, Panama
30 June 2010
Clay

Trinidad and Tobago
2

| | | | 1 | 2 | 3 |
|---|---|---|---|---|---|
| 1 | (United States Virgin Islands) (Trinidad and Tobago) | Brian Oldfield; Yohansey Williams | 7^{8} 6^{6} | 7^{7} 6^{4} |
| 2 | (United States Virgin Islands) (Trinidad and Tobago) | Kristepher Elien; Joseph Cadogan | 6^{7} 7^{9} | 4; 6 |
| 3 | (United States Virgin Islands) (Trinidad and Tobago) | Nicholas Bass / Brian Oldfield; Liam Gomez / Dawoud Kabli | 4; 6 | 1; 6 |

=== Barbados vs. US Virgin Islands ===
Barbados
3
Panama City, Panama
1 July 2010
Clay

U.S. Virgin Islands
0

| | | | 1 | 2 | 3 |
|---|---|---|---|---|---|
| 1 | (Barbados) (United States Virgin Islands) | Anthony Marshall; Brian Oldfield | 6; 2 | 6; 0 |
| 2 | (Barbados) (United States Virgin Islands) | Haydn Lewis; Kristepher Elien | 6; 1 | 6; 3 |
| 3 | (Barbados) (United States Virgin Islands) | Ryan Moseley / Seanon Williams; Nicholas Bass / Brian Oldfield | 6; 3 | 6; 2 |

=== Honduras vs. Trinidad & Tobago ===
Honduras
2
Panama City, Panama
1 July 2010
Clay

Trinidad and Tobago
1

| | | | 1 | 2 | 3 |
|---|---|---|---|---|---|
| 1 | (Honduras) (Trinidad and Tobago) | Calton Álvarez; Yohansey Williams | 6; 3 | 6; 3 |
| 2 | (Honduras) (Trinidad and Tobago) | José Moncada; Joseph Cadogan | 6; 2 | 3; 6 | 4; 6 |
| 3 | (Honduras) (Trinidad and Tobago) | Calton Álvarez / José Moncada; Liam Gomez / Dawoud Kabli | 6; 2 | 4; 6 | 6; 3 |

=== Barbados vs. Honduras ===
Barbados
2
Panama City, Panama
2 July 2010
Clay

Honduras
1

| | | | 1 | 2 | 3 |
|---|---|---|---|---|---|
| 1 | (Barbados) (Honduras) | Anthony Marshall; José Moncada | 6; 4 | 6; 4 |
| 2 | (Barbados) (Honduras) | Haydn Lewis; Keny Turcios | 6; 2 | 6; 3 |
| 3 | (Barbados) (Honduras) | Ryan Moseley / Seanon Williams; Ricardo Pineda / Keny Turcios | 0; 6 | 3; 6 |

=== Panama vs. Trinidad & Tobago ===
Panama
2
Panama City, Panama
2 July 2010
Clay

Trinidad and Tobago
1

| | | | 1 | 2 | 3 |
|---|---|---|---|---|---|
| 1 | (Panama) (Trinidad and Tobago) | Juan Miguel González; Yohansey Williams | 5; 7 | 6; 2 | 2; 6 |
| 2 | (Panama) (Trinidad and Tobago) | Alberto González; Joseph Cadogan | 6; 3 | 7^{8} 6^{6} |
| 3 | (Panama) (Trinidad and Tobago) | Alberto González / Juan Miguel González; Liam Gomez / Dawoud Kabli | 6; 3 | 7; 5 |

=== Barbados vs. Panama ===
Barbados
2
Panama City, Panama
3 July 2010
Clay

Panama
1

| | | | 1 | 2 | 3 |
|---|---|---|---|---|---|
| 1 | (Barbados) (Panama) | Anthony Marshall; Alberto González | 4; 6 | 1; 6 |
| 2 | (Barbados) (Panama) | Haydn Lewis; Walner Espinoza | 7; 5 | 6; 1 |
| 3 | (Barbados) (Panama) | Haydn Lewis / Ryan Moseley; Juan Miguel González / Walner Espinoza | 6; 4 | 6; 3 |

=== US Virgin Islands vs. Honduras ===
U.S. Virgin Islands
0
Panama City, Panama
3 July 2010
Clay

Honduras
3

| | | | 1 | 2 | 3 |
|---|---|---|---|---|---|
| 1 | (United States Virgin Islands) (Honduras) | Brian Oldfield; Calton Álvarez | 2; 6 | 4; 6 |
| 2 | (United States Virgin Islands) (Honduras) | Nicholas Bass; José Moncada | 0; 6 | 2; 6 |
| 3 | (United States Virgin Islands) (Honduras) | Nicholas Bass / Brian Oldfield; Calton Álvarez / José Moncada | 1; 6 | 0; 6 |
