= 2018 Davis Cup Americas Zone Group I =

International tennis competition

The Americas Zone is one of the three regional zones of the 2018 Davis Cup.

In the Americas Zone there are three different tiers, called groups, in which teams competed against each other to advance to the upper tier. Winners in Group I advanced to the World Group play-offs, along with losing teams from the World Group first round. Teams who lost their respective ties competed in the relegation play-offs, with winning teams remaining in Group I, whereas teams who lost their play-offs were relegated to the Americas Zone Group II in 2019.

== Participating nations ==
Seeds: The first seed received a bye into the second round.

1. Argentina
2. Brazil

Remaining nations:

- Barbados
- Chile
- Colombia
- Dominican Republic
- Ecuador

=== Draw ===
Second Round Play-offs
Saint Michael, Barbados (hard)
Ecuador	4
Barbados	0

First Round Play-offs
bye
Ecuador
Santo Domingo Este, Dominican Republic (hard)
Barbados	0
Dominican Republic	4

First Round
1	Argentina
bye
Santiago, Chile (clay)
Chile	3
Ecuador	1
Saint Michael, Barbados (hard)
Colombia	4
Barbados	0
Santo Domingo, Dominican Republic (hard)
Dominican Republic	2
2	Brazil	3

Second Round
San Juan, Argentina (indoor clay)
1	Argentina	3
Chile	2
Barranquilla, Colombia (hard)
Colombia	3
2	Brazil	2

- Barbados relegated to Group II in 2019.
- Argentina and Colombia advance to World Group Play-off.

== First round ==
=== Chile vs. Ecuador ===
Chile
3
Court Central Anita Lizana, Santiago, Chile
2–3 February
Clay

Ecuador
1

			1	2	3
1	(Chile) (Ecuador)	Nicolás Jarry; Iván Endara	6; 2	6; 3
2	(Chile) (Ecuador)	Gonzalo Lama; Roberto Quiroz	3; 6	7^{13} 6^{11}	3; 6
3	(Chile) (Ecuador)	Nicolás Jarry / Hans Podlipnik-Castillo; Diego Hidalgo / Roberto Quiroz	7^{8} 6^{6}	7^{7} 6^{5}
4	(Chile) (Ecuador)	Nicolás Jarry; Roberto Quiroz	6; 4	7^{8} 6^{6}
5	(Chile) (Ecuador)	Gonzalo Lama; Iván Endara				not played

=== Barbados vs. Colombia ===
Barbados
0
National Tennis Centre, Saint Michael, Barbados
2–3 February
Hard

Colombia
4

			1	2	3
1	(Barbados) (Colombia)	Haydn Lewis; Daniel Elahi Galán	0; 6	4; 6
2	(Barbados) (Colombia)	Darian King; Alejandro González	5; 7	3; 6
3	(Barbados) (Colombia)	Darian King / Haydn Lewis; Juan Sebastián Cabal / Robert Farah	2; 6	6^{4} 7^{7}
4	(Barbados) (Colombia)	Xavier Lawrence; Cristian Rodríguez	3; 6	0; 6
5	(Barbados) (Colombia)	Haydn Lewis; Alejandro González				not played

=== Dominican Republic vs. Brazil ===
Dominican Republic
2
Club Deportivo Naco, Santo Domingo, Dominican Republic
2–3 February
Hard

Brazil
3

			1	2	3
1	(Dominican Republic) (Brazil)	José Hernández-Fernández; João Pedro Sorgi	6; 2	4; 6	7^{7} 6^{3}
2	(Dominican Republic) (Brazil)	Roberto Cid Subervi; Thiago Monteiro	7^{8} 6^{6}	5; 7	2; 6
3	(Dominican Republic) (Brazil)	Nick Hardt / José Olivares; Marcelo Demoliner / Marcelo Melo	3; 6	4; 6
4	(Dominican Republic) (Brazil)	José Hernández-Fernández; Thiago Monteiro	6; 4	7^{7} 6^{4}
5	(Dominican Republic) (Brazil)	Roberto Cid Subervi; João Pedro Sorgi	7^{10} 6^{8}	1; 6	4; 6

== Second round ==
=== Argentina vs. Chile ===
Argentina
3
Estadio Aldo Cantoni, San Juan, Argentina
6–7 April
Clay (i)

Chile
2

			1	2	3
1	(Argentina) (Chile)	Nicolás Kicker; Nicolás Jarry	6; 4	6^{6} 7^{8}	2; 6
2	(Argentina) (Chile)	Diego Schwartzman; Christian Garín	7^{7} 6^{2}	6^{2} 7^{7}	6; 2
3	(Argentina) (Chile)	Guido Pella / Máximo González; Nicolás Jarry / Hans Podlipnik	7^{9} 6^{7}	5; 7	3; 6
4	(Argentina) (Chile)	Diego Schwartzman; Nicolás Jarry	6; 4	6; 4
5	(Argentina) (Chile)	Guido Pella; Christian Garín	6; 3	7^{7} 6^{3}

=== Colombia vs. Brazil ===
Colombia
3
Parque Distrital de Raquetas, Barranquilla, Colombia
6–7 April
Hard

Brazil
2

			1	2	3
1	(Colombia) (Brazil)	Santiago Giraldo; Thiago Monteiro	1; 6	2; 6
2	(Colombia) (Brazil)	Daniel Elahi Galán; Guilherme Clezar	3; 6	6; 2	6; 1
3	(Colombia) (Brazil)	Juan Sebastián Cabal / Robert Farah; Marcelo Demoliner / Marcelo Melo	6^{5} 7^{7}	4; 6
4	(Colombia) (Brazil)	Daniel Elahi Galán; Thiago Monteiro	6; 3	6; 3
5	(Colombia) (Brazil)	Alejandro González; João Pedro Sorgi	6; 3	7^{7} 6^{0}

== 1st round play-offs ==
=== Dominican Republic vs. Barbados ===
Dominican Republic
4
Centro Nacional de Tenis Parque del Este, Santo Domingo Este, Dominican Republic
6–7 April
Hard

Barbados
0

			1	2	3
1	(Dominican Republic) (Barbados)	Roberto Cid Subervi; Haydn Lewis	7^{7} 6^{5}	2; 0		retired
2	(Dominican Republic) (Barbados)	Víctor Estrella Burgos; Xavier Lawrence	6; 0	6; 2
3	(Dominican Republic) (Barbados)	Nick Hardt / José Olivares; Xavier Lawrence / Kaipo Marshall	6; 3	6; 1
4	(Dominican Republic) (Barbados)	José Olivares; Kaipo Marshall	6; 0	6; 1
5	(Dominican Republic) (Barbados)	Roberto Cid Subervi; Xavier Lawrence				not played

== 2nd round play-offs ==
=== Barbados vs. Ecuador ===
Barbados
0
National Tennis Centre, Saint Michael, Barbados
14–15 September
Hard

Ecuador
4

			1	2	3
1	(Barbados) (Ecuador)	Matthew Foster-Estwick; Roberto Quiroz	0; 6	1; 6
2	(Barbados) (Ecuador)	Darian King; Emilio Gómez	3; 6	6; 3	3; 6
3	(Barbados) (Ecuador)	Darian King / Haydn Lewis; Gonzalo Escobar / Diego Hidalgo	4; 6	6^{0} 7^{7}
4	(Barbados) (Ecuador)	Xavier Lawrence; Diego Hidalgo	0; 6	1; 6
5	(Barbados) (Ecuador)	Matthew Foster-Estwick; Emilio Gómez				not played
