= Darian King =

Barbadian tennis player (born 1992)

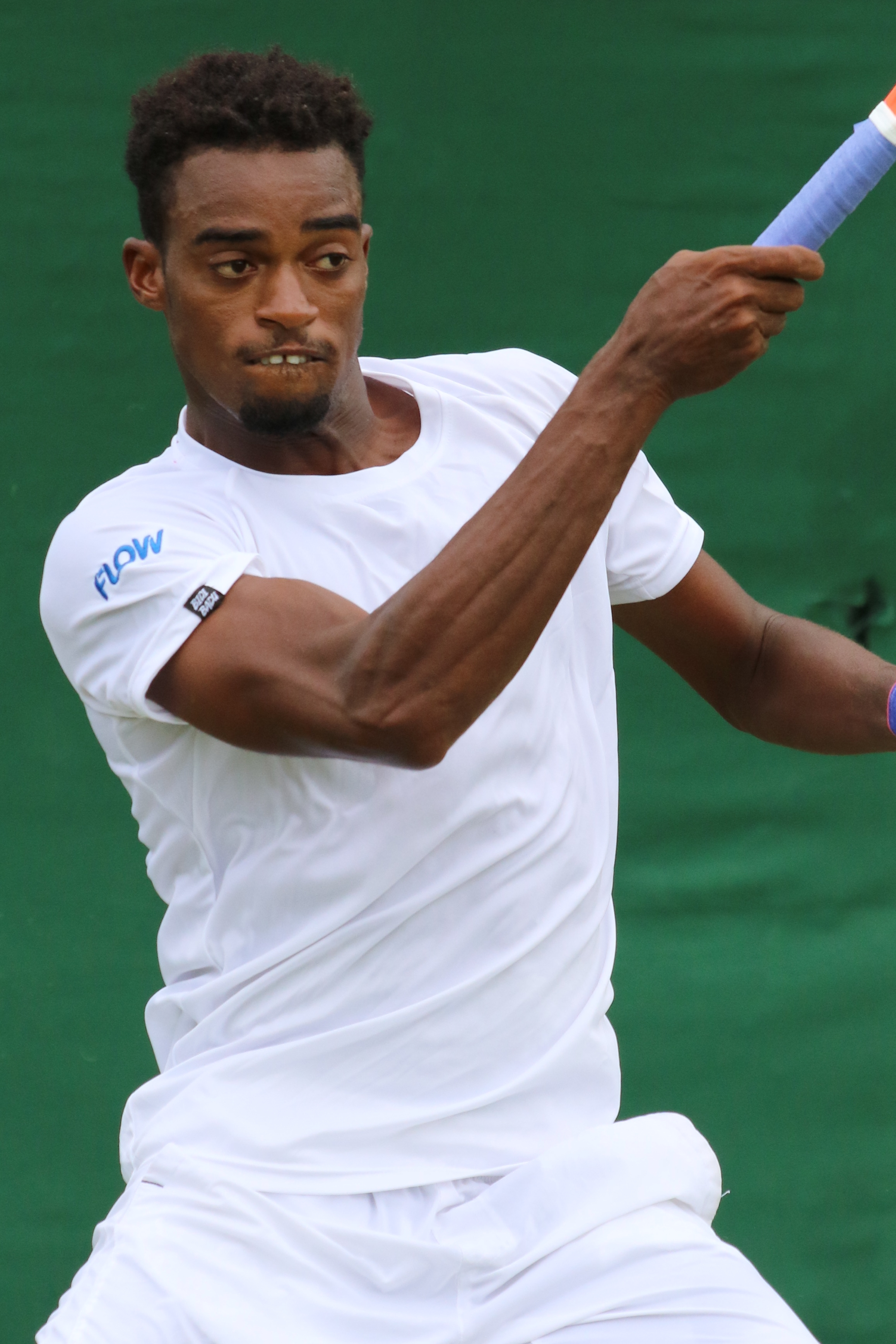
- Darian King at Wimbledon 2016
- Full name: Darian King
- Country (sports): Barbados
- Residence: Bridgetown, Barbados
- Born: 26 April 1992 (age 34) Bridgetown, Barbados
- Height: 1.88 m (6 ft 2 in)
- Turned pro: 2010
- Plays: Right-handed (two handed-backhand)
- Coach: Christopher King
- Prize money: US$634,885

Singles
- Career record: 38–22 (at ATP Tour level, Grand Slam level, and in Davis Cup)
- Career titles: 0
- Highest ranking: No. 106 (8 May 2017)
- Current ranking: No. 907 (11 December 2022)

Grand Slam singles results
- Australian Open: Q3 (2018, 2019)
- French Open: Q1 (2017, 2018, 2019)
- Wimbledon: Q3 (2017)
- US Open: 1R (2017)

Other tournaments
- Olympic Games: 1R (2016)

Doubles
- Career record: 9–13
- Career titles: 0
- Highest ranking: No. 156 (21 October 2019)
- Current ranking: No. 282 (17 May 2021)

Grand Slam doubles results
- Wimbledon: Q1 (2017)

Team competitions
- Davis Cup: 40–22
- Last updated on: 23 May 2021.

Darian King (born 26 April 1992 in Bridgetown) is a Barbadian tennis player. He has a career-high Association of Tennis Professionals (ATP) singles ranking of world No. 106 achieved on 8 May 2017, and a career-high ATP doubles ranking of No. 156 achieved on 21 October 2019. He has represented Barbados at the Davis Cup and at the 2016 Olympics. His first Grand Slam appearance came at the 2017 US Open, where he lost to fourth seed Alexander Zverev in straight sets.

== Personal life ==
King was born on April 26, 1992, in Bridgetown, Barbados, where he currently resides. His father played field hockey and his mother played net ball and died of pancreatic cancer in 2010. He has 3 siblings; 2 brothers and 1 sister. One of the brothers, Christopher, is King's current head coach. He is good friends with many tennis players Frances Tiafoe, Dustin Brown, Noah Rubin, Taylor Townsend, and Sloane Stephens. His favorite athlete is Usain Bolt.

== Career ==
=== Junior career ===
King began playing tennis at the age of 8 and grew up idolizing Gaël Monfils, Jo-Wilfried Tsonga, and Dustin Brown (now good friends with King). He played his first junior match in April 2006 at the age of 13 at a grade 4 tournament in Barbados. During his junior career, King made both the singles and doubles draw in 3 of the 4 boys grand slams in 2010 where he failed to make it past the first round once in the singles and made it to the second round twice in the doubles. In one tournament, he defeated future world No. 3 and 2020 US Open champion Dominic Thiem. He ended his junior career with a high ranking of 47 in both the singles and the doubles (both attained on January 4, 2010) and a record of 78–47 in singles and 81–35 in doubles.

Junior Grand Slam results – Singles:

Australian Open: A (-)
French Open: 1R (2010)
Wimbledon: 1R (2010)
US Open: 1R (2010)

Junior Grand Slam results – Doubles:

Australian Open: A (-)
French Open: 2R (2010)
Wimbledon: 2R (2010)
US Open: 1R (2010)

=== Professional career ===
King officially turned pro in 2010 at the age of 17. He was considering on playing college tennis at UCLA but made the decision to turn pro instead. Between 2011 and 2016, King would go on to make 22 ITF futures finals, winning 13 of them. The first one of those titles was at a M25 tournament in Manzanillo in 2012. These results would continuously improve his year-end ranking.

In 2014 at the Charlottesville Challenger, King threw his racket at a lineswoman which got him defaulted. The incident went widespread throughout the tennis community and internet.

In 2015 at the Citi Open, King became the first Barbadian to qualify for an ATP event. He lost to Go Soeda in the first round in straight sets.

In 2016, King made his first challenger final at the 2016 Milo Open Cali. In the final, he defeated top seed Víctor Estrella Burgos in three sets to win his first challenger title. Two weeks later, he won another challenger title at the 2016 Levene Goulding and Thompson Tennis Challenger defeating Mitchell Krueger in the final in straight sets. Two months later, he would win his third challenger title of the year at the 2016 Tiburon Challenger defeating Michael Mmoh in the final in straight sets. This would also be the year that King played in the 2016 Summer Olympics having been invited to play in the main draw in the singles. He lost to eventual quarterfinalist Steve Johnson in the first round in straight sets.

In 2017, King became the first Barbadian to win an ATP match at the Memphis Open when he won against 5th seed Bernard Tomic in straight sets. He would then follow this up with back to back second round appearances at Indian Wells and the Miami Open, losing to his idol Gaël Monfils in Indian Wells in three sets and to David Goffin in Miami both in straight sets. He reached his career high-ranking of 106 on May 8, 2017. He then went into the 2017 Wimbledon qualifying as 8th send and made it to the qualifying competition before being eliminated by Lukáš Rosol in 4 sets. He qualified for the 2017 US Open for his first and only grand slam. He lost to 4th seed Alexander Zverev in very close straight sets. He finished 2017 with a fourth challenger final at the 2017 Stockton Challenger where he lost to Cameron Norrie in straight sets.

Throughout 2018–2021 his ranking would slowly start to decline. He made two more challenger finals at the 2018 Indian Wells Challenger and the 2019 Orlando Open but lost both. He also made three more qualifying competitions at Grand Slams. Twice at the Australian Open (2018), (2019) and once at the US Open (2019). He would once again lose every single one. He did have some success in doubles, however. In the doubles, he would make 26 ITF futures finals and win 18 of them. In the challenger tour, he made seven challenger finals and won four of them. He's also known for partnering with Peter Polansky on numerous occasions.

During the COVID-19 pandemic in 2020, King underwent wrist surgery which would keep him inactive until February 2021.

=== Davis Cup ===
King made his Davis Cup debut in 2009 at the age of 16. During his time with the Barbadian Davis Cup team, he posted a win–loss record of 29–11 in singles, 11–11 in doubles, and 40–22 overall.

== Challenger and Futures finals ==
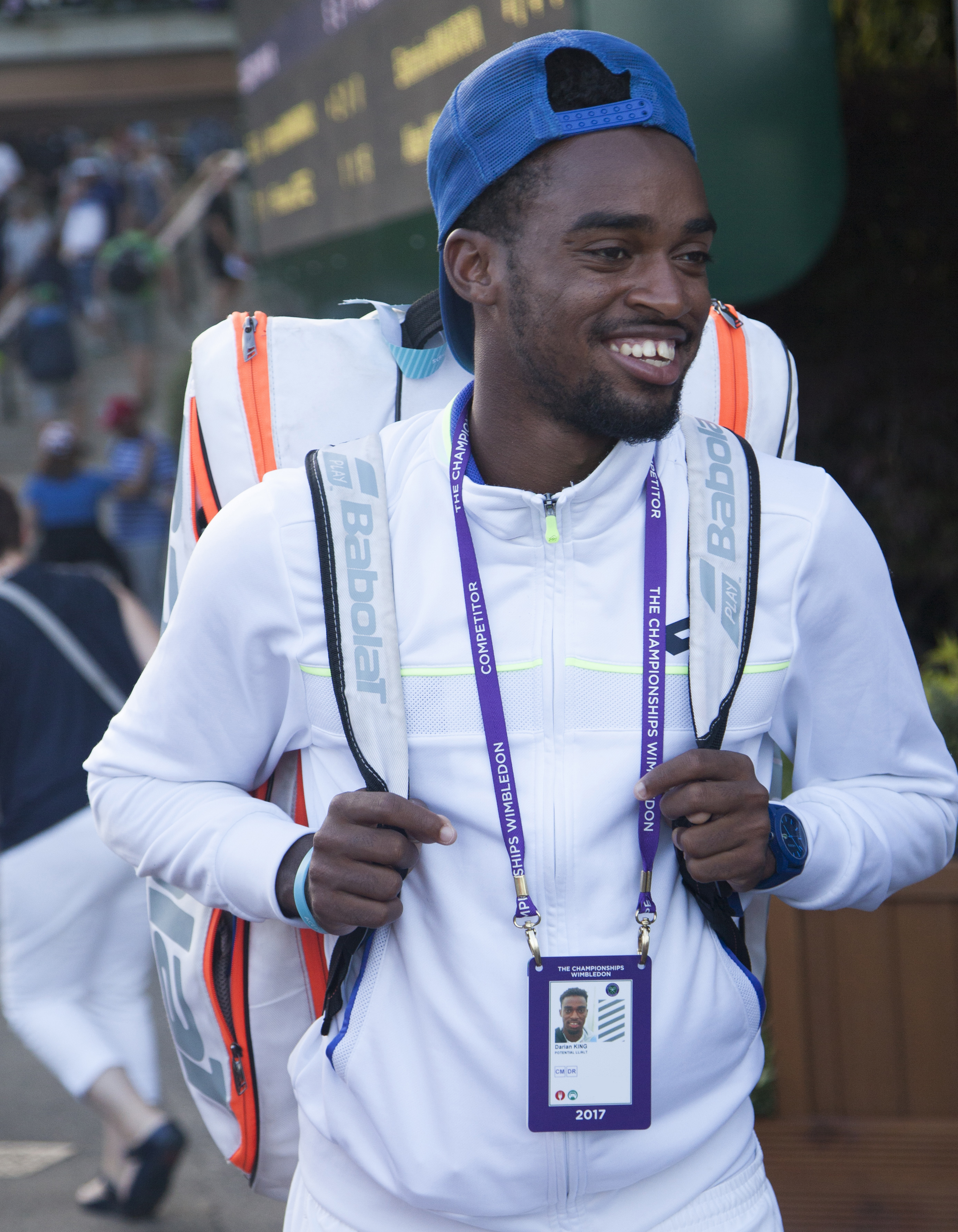
Darian King at Wimbledon

=== Singles: 32 (18–14) ===
Legend (singles) ATP Challenger Tour (3–3) ITF Futures/World Tennis Tour (15–11)	Titles by surface Hard (10–14) Clay (8–0) Grass (0–0) Carpet (0–0)

Result	W–L	Date	Tournament	Tier	Surface	Opponent	Score
Loss	0–1	Sep 2011	USA F23, Claremont	Futures	Hard	(United States) Steve Johnson	2–6, 3–6
Loss	0–2	Jul 2012	USA F20, Joplin	Futures	Hard	(France) Sébastien Boltz	3–6, 3–6
Win	1–2	Sep 2012	Mexico F9, Manzanillo	Futures	Hard	(Brazil) Alexandre Schnitman	6–4, 5–0 ret.
Win	2–2	Sep 2012	Mexico F11, Manzanillo	Futures	Hard	(Japan) Yoshihito Nishioka	6–0, 6–1
Loss	2–3	May 2013	Mexico F6, Puebla	Futures	Hard	(Mexico) Miguel Gallardo Valles	6–3, 3–6, 2–6
Win	3–3	Jul 2013	USA F20, Joplin	Futures	Hard	(United States) Alexander Sarkissian	6–3, 7–6^{(7–3)}
Loss	3–4	Oct 2013	Mexico F16, Quintana Roo	Futures	Hard	(Venezuela) David Souto	6–4, 4–6, 1–6
Loss	3–5	Nov 2013	Mexico F17, Quintana Roo	Futures	Hard	(Colombia) Michael Quintero	5–7, 6–0, 2–6
Win	4–5	Mar 2014	USA F7, Sunrise	Futures	Clay	(Austria) Marc Rath	6–7^{(2–7)}, 7–5, 6–1
Win	5–5	Aug 2014	Romania F11, Iași	Futures	Clay	(Slovakia) Filip Horanský	7–6^{(10–8)}, 6–0
Win	6–5	Aug 2014	Netherlands F6, Rotterdam	Futures	Clay	(France) Julien Obry	2–6, 6–3, 6–2
Loss	6–6	Nov 2014	Mexico F12, Huatulco	Futures	Hard	(Argentina) Agustín Velotti	1–6, 6–4, 5–7
Win	7–6	Feb 2015	Panama F1, Panama City	Futures	Clay	(Austria) Bastian Trinker	6–2, 6–2
Loss	7–7	Apr 2015	USA F13, Little Rock	Futures	Hard	(United States) Jason Jung	3–6, 6–4, 4–6
Win	8–7	May 2015	USA F15, Orange Park	Futures	Clay	(United States) Stefan Kozlov	6–2, 3–6, 6–0
Win	9–7	May 2015	Mexico F4, Córdoba	Futures	Hard	(United States) Ernesto Escobedo	7–5, 5–7, 6–4
Win	10–7	Jun 2015	USA F19, Tulsa	Futures	Hard	(United States) Noah Rubin	2–6, 7–5, 6–0
Win	11–7	Nov 2015	Venezuela F3, Margarita Island	Futures	Hard	(Serbia) Peđa Krstin	6–3, 1–0 ret.
Win	12–7	Nov 2015	El Salvador F2, La Libertad	Futures	Hard	(El Salvador) Marcelo Arévalo	7–6^{(8–6)}, 6–4
Win	13–7	May 2016	Mexico F1, Córdoba	Futures	Hard	(United States) Adam El Mihdawy	6–1, 6–4
Loss	13–8	May 2016	Mexico F2, Pachuca	Futures	Hard	(Chile) Marcelo Tomás Barrios Vera	1–6, 6–7^{(3–7)}
Loss	13–9	Jun 2016	USA F18, Winston-Salem	Futures	Hard	(United States) Sekou Bangoura	3–6, 2–6
Win	14-9	Jul 2016	Cali, Colombia	Challenger	Clay	(Dominican Republic) Víctor Estrella Burgos	5–7, 6–4, 7–5
Win	15-9	Jul 2016	Binghamton, USA	Challenger	Hard	(United States) Mitchell Krueger	6–2, 6–3
Win	16-9	Oct 2016	Tiburon, USA	Challenger	Hard	(United States) Michael Mmoh	7–6^{(7–2)}, 6–2
Loss	16-10	Oct 2017	Stockton, USA	Challenger	Hard	(United Kingdom) Cameron Norrie	1–6, 3–6
Loss	16-11	Mar 2018	Indian Wells, USA	Challenger	Hard	(Slovakia) Martin Kližan	3–6, 3–6
Loss	16-12	Jan 2019	Orlando, USA	Challenger	Hard	(United States) Marcos Giron	4–6, 4–6
Loss	16-13	Nov 2022	M15 Santo Domingo, Dominican Republic	World Tennis Tour	Hard	(Australia) Bernard Tomic	3–6, 6–4, 3–6
Loss	16-14	Jan 2023	M15 Ithaca, USA	World Tennis Tour	Hard	(Romania) Radu Mihai Papoe	6–1, 4–6, 2–6
Win	17-14	Jul 2023	M15 Rochester, USA	World Tennis Tour	Clay	(Argentina) Ignacio Monzón	6–0, 7–6^{(7–2)}
Win	18-14	Jul 2023	M15 Pittsburgh, USA	World Tennis Tour	Clay	(Canada) Juan Carlos Aguilar	4–6, 6–3, 6–3

=== Doubles: 33 (22–11) ===
Legend (doubles) ATP Challenger Tour (4–3) ITF Futures Tour (18–8)	Titles by surface Hard (17–8) Clay (5–3) Grass (0–0) Carpet (0–0)

Result	W–L	Date	Tournament	Tier	Surface	Partner	Opponents	Score
Win	1–0	Mar 2011	Canada F1, Montreal	Futures	Hard (i)	(Barbados) Haydn Lewis	(Belgium) Maxime Authom (Switzerland) Adrien Bossel	6–4, 2–6, [10–5]
Loss	1–1	May 2011	Venezuela F3, Caracas	Futures	Hard	(Argentina) Armando Javier Boschetti	(Venezuela) Piero Luisi (Venezuela) Román Recarte	6–3, 2–6, [8–10]
Win	2–1	May 2011	Mexico F3, Mexico City	Futures	Hard	(Barbados) Haydn Lewis	(Guatemala) Christopher Díaz Figueroa (Mexico) Miguel Gallardo Valles	6–3, 6–4
Loss	2–2	May 2011	Mexico F4, Guadalajara	Futures	Hard	(Barbados) Haydn Lewis	(Mexico) Luis Díaz Barriga (Mexico) Antonio Ruiz-Rosales	6–7^{(7–9)}, 4–6
Loss	2–3	Sep 2011	Canada F5, Toronto	Futures	Clay	(United States) Sekou Bangoura	(United States) Maciek Sykut (United States) Denis Zivkovic	2–6, 1–6
Win	3–3	May 2012	Mexico F5, Celaya	Futures	Hard	(United States) Devin Britton	(Australia) Ben Wagland (Australia) Marious Zelba	2–6, 6–4, [10–4]
Win	4–3	May 2012	Mexico F6, Guadalajara	Futures	Hard	(United States) Devin Britton	(Mexico) Miguel Ángel Reyes-Varela (Mexico) Bruno Rodríguez	6–3, 5–7, [10–4]
Win	5–3	Jun 2012	USA F16, Indian Harbour Beach	Futures	Clay	(Philippines) Ruben Gonzales	(United States) Kevin King (Colombia) Juan Carlos Spir	6–2, 3–6, [10–4]
Loss	5–4	Jul 2012	USA F20, Joplin	Futures	Hard	(Australia) Yuri Bezeruk	(United States) Harrison Adams (United States) Shane Vinsant	3–6, 6–2, [11–13]
Loss	5–5	Sep 2012	Mexico F10, Manzanillo	Futures	Hard	(Guatemala) Christopher Díaz Figueroa	(El Salvador) Marcelo Arévalo (Mexico) Miguel Ángel Reyes-Varela	1–6, 5–7
Win	6–5	Nov 2012	Mexico F14, Mérida	Futures	Hard	(Australia) Yuri Bezeruk	(Mexico) Mauricio Astorga (New Zealand) Marvin Barker	6–3, 6–1
Win	7–5	Jan 2013	Mexico F1, Ixtapa	Futures	Hard	(Australia) Chris Letcher	(Greece) Theodoros Angelinos (France) Antoine Benneteau	6–3, 6–1
Loss	7–6	May 2013	Mexico F6, Puebla	Futures	Hard	(Puerto Rico) Alex Llompart	(Mexico) Miguel Gallardo Valles (Mexico) Alan Núñez Aguilera	4–6, 1–6
Loss	7–7	Jun 2013	Greece F9, Thessaloniki	Futures	Clay	(Germany) Dominik Schulz	(Greece) Konstantinos Economidis (Greece) Alexandros Jakupovic	1–6, 2–6
Win	8–7	Oct 2013	Mexico F14, Pachuca	Futures	Hard	(Guatemala) Christopher Díaz Figueroa	(South Africa) Dean O'Brien (Colombia) Juan Carlos Spir	6–4, 2–6, [10–8]
Loss	8–8	Feb 2014	USA F6, Boynton Beach	Futures	Clay	(Mexico) Daniel Garza	(United States) Collin Altamirano (United States) Deiton Baughman	4–6, 4–6
Win	9–8	Feb 2015	USA F7, Sunrise	Futures	Clay	(United States) Cătălin Gârd	(China) Li Yuanfeng (United States) Wil Spencer	6–2, 6–1
Win	10–8	Feb 2015	USA F8, Plantation	Futures	Clay	(United States) Cătălin Gârd	(Argentina) Juan Ignacio Galarza (Argentina) Patricio Heras	6–2, 6–4
Win	11–8	Feb 2015	Panama F1, Panama City	Futures	Clay	(Chile) Julio Peralta	(Ecuador) Iván Endara (Argentina) Eduardo Agustín Torre	w/o
Win	12–8	Mar 2015	USA F10, Bakersfield	Futures	Hard	(United States) Sekou Bangoura	(United States) Mitchell Krueger (United States) Connor Smith	6–4, 4–6, [10–7]
Win	13–8	Jul 2015	USA F21, Wichita	Futures	Hard	(India) Sanam Singh	(United States) Gonzales Austin (United States) Max Schnur	6–3, 6–3
Win	14–8	Nov 2015	Venezuela F3, Margarita Island	Futures	Hard	(Venezuela) Luis Fernando Ramírez	(Guatemala) Christopher Díaz Figueroa (Argentina) Franco Feitt	6–2, 3–6, [10–7]
Win	15–8	Nov 2015	El Salvador F2, La Libertad	Futures	Hard	(Ecuador) Emilio Gómez	(El Salvador) Marcelo Arévalo (Guatemala) Christopher Díaz Figueroa	6–3, 7–6^{(12–10)}
Win	16–8	Apr 2016	Greece F3, Heraklion	Futures	Hard	(Venezuela) Ricardo Rodríguez	(Sweden) Daniel Appelgren (Sweden) Christian Samuelsson	7–6^{(8–6)}, 6–1
Win	17–8	May 2016	Mexico F2, Pachuca	Futures	Hard	(Philippines) Ruben Gonzales	(Colombia) José Daniel Bendeck (Mexico) Alejandro Moreno Figueroa	6–7^{(2–7)}, 7–6^{(7–3)}, [10–4]
Win	18–8	Jul 2016	USA F23, Wichita	Futures	Hard	(United States) Sekou Bangoura	(United States) Nicolas Meister (United States) Eric Quigley	6–2, 6–3
Win	1–0	Jul 2017	Medellín, Colombia	Challenger	Clay	(Mexico) Miguel Ángel; Reyes-Varela	(Chile) Nicolás Jarry (Ecuador) Roberto Quiroz	6–4, 6–4
Loss	1–1	Jul 2018	Gatineau, Canada	Challenger	Hard	(Canada) Peter Polansky	(United States) Robert Galloway (United States) Bradley Klahn	6–7^{(4–7)}, 6–4, [8–10]
Win	2–1	Oct 2018	Stockton, USA	Challenger	Hard	(United States) Noah Rubin	(Thailand) Sanchai Ratiwatana (Indonesia) Christopher Rungkat	6–3, 6–4
Loss	2–2	Mar 2019	Indian Wells, USA	Challenger	Hard	(United States) Hunter Reese	(United States) JC Aragone (United States) Marcos Giron	4–6, 4–6
Win	3–2	July 2019	Winnipeg, Canada	Challenger	Hard	(Canada) Peter Polansky	(Canada) Adil Shamasdin (United States) Hunter Reese	7–6^{(10–8)}, 6–3
Loss	3-3	Sep 2019	Tiburon, USA	Challenger	Hard	(United States) JC Aragone	(United States) Robert Galloway (Venezuela) Roberto Maytín	2-6, 5-7
Win	4–3	Oct 2019	Fairfield, Canada	Challenger	Hard	(Canada) Peter Polansky	(Netherlands) Sem Verbeek (Sweden) André Göransson	6–4, 3–6, [12–10]

== Performance timelines ==
Key
W	F	SF	QF	#R	RR	Q#	P#	DNQ	A	Z#	PO	G	S	B	NMS	NTI	P	NH

(W) winner; (F) finalist; (SF) semifinalist; (QF) quarterfinalist; (#R) rounds 4, 3, 2, 1; (RR) round-robin stage; (Q#) qualification round; (P#) preliminary round; (DNQ) did not qualify; (A) absent; (Z#) Davis/Fed Cup Zonal Group (with number indication) or (PO) play-off; (G) gold, (S) silver or (B) bronze Olympic/Paralympic medal; (NMS) not a Masters tournament; (NTI) not a Tier I tournament; (P) postponed; (NH) not held; (SR) strike rate (events won / competed); (W–L) win–loss record.
To avoid confusion and double counting, these charts are updated at the conclusion of a tournament or when the player's participation has ended.

=== Singles ===
Current through the 2022 Davis Cup.

Tournament	2009	2010	2011	2012	2013	2014	2015	2016	2017	2018	2019	2020	2021	2022	SR	W–L	Win %
Grand Slam tournaments
Australian Open	A	A	A	A	A	A	A	Q1	Q2	Q3	Q3	Q1	A	A	0 / 0	0–0	0%
French Open	A	A	A	A	A	A	A	A	Q1	Q1	Q1	A	A	A	0 / 0	0–0	0%
Wimbledon	A	A	A	A	A	A	A	Q2	Q3	Q1	Q1	NH	A	A	0 / 0	0–0	0%
US Open	A	A	A	A	A	A	Q1	Q2	1R	Q1	Q3	A	A		0 / 1	0–1	0%
Win–loss	0–0	0–0	0–0	0–0	0–0	0–0	0–0	0–0	0–1	0–0	0–0	0–0	0–0	0–0	0 / 1	0–1	0%
ATP World Tour Masters 1000
Indian Wells Masters	A	A	A	A	A	A	A	A	2R	Q1	Q1	NH	A		0 / 1	1–1	50%
Miami Open	A	A	A	A	A	A	A	A	2R	1R	Q1	NH	A		0 / 2	1–2	33%
Italian Open	A	A	A	A	A	A	A	A	Q1	A	A	A	A		0 / 0	0–0	0%
Win–loss	0–0	0–0	0–0	0–0	0–0	0–0	0–0	0–0	2–2	0–2	0–0	0–0	0–0	0–0	0 / 3	2–3	40%
National representation
Summer Olympics	Not Held			A	Not Held			1R	Not Held				A		0 / 1	0–1	0%
Davis Cup	Z3	A	Z3	Z2	Z2	Z2	Z1	Z1	Z2	Z1	Z1	PO			0 / 0	31–12	72%
Win–loss	1–2	0–0	4–1	1–1	3–1	6–0	5–1	2–2	6–0	0–2	1–1	0–1	2–0	0–1	0 / 1	31–13	70%
Career statistics
	2009	2010	2011	2012	2013	2014	2015	2016	2017	2018	2019	2020	2021	2022	Career		
Tournaments	0	0	0	0	0	0	1	2	4	2	1	0	0	0	10		
Overall win–loss	0–0	0–0	0–0	1–1	3–1	6–0	5–2	2–2	9–4	0–4	1–2	0–1	2–0	0–1	29–18		
Win %	0%	0%	0%	50%	75%	100%	71%	50%	69%	0%	33%	0%	100%		61.7%		
Year-end ranking	–	1675	721	490	486	314	226	152	173	198	166	285	383		$ 629,778		

== Record against other players ==
King's match record against those who have been ranked in the top 10, with those who have been ranked No. 1 in boldface. ATP Tour matches and qualifying matches, ATP Challenger Tour matches and qualifying matches, ITF Tour matches and qualifying matches, and Davis Cup all count on record.

- (Cyprus) Marcos Baghdatis 1–1
- (Belgium) David Goffin 0–1
- (Austria) Jürgen Melzer 0–1
- (France) Gaël Monfils 0–1
- (Germany) Alexander Zverev 0–1
- (France) Lucas Pouille 0–2

* As of 21 August 2021.
