= 2000 Davis Cup Americas Zone Group I =

One of three regional zones that competed for the regional Davis Cup

The Americas Zone was one of the three regional Davis Cup competition zones in 2000.

In the Americas Zone there were four different tiers, called groups, in which teams competed against each other to advance to the upper tier. Winners in Group I advanced to the World Group qualifying round, along with losing teams from the World Group first round. Teams who lost their respective ties competed in the relegation play-offs, with winning teams remaining in Group I, whereas teams who lost their play-offs were relegated to the Americas Zone Group II in 2001.

The second-round tie between Chile and Argentina was marred by crowd trouble, which resulted in the Argentinian team withdrawing from the tie. Chile was declared the winner of the tie by the Davis Cup Committee. However, subsequent rulings prevented Chile from progressing to the Qualifying Round; additionally, both teams received fines, and Chile was barred from hosting home ties until 2002.

== Participating nations ==
- Argentina
- Bahamas
- Canada
- Chile
- Colombia
- Ecuador
- Peru

=== Draw ===
Second Round Play-offs
Bogotá, Colombia (clay)
Argentina	4
Colombia	1

First Round Play-offs
Montreal, Canada (hard)
Argentina	1
Canada	4
Nassau, Bahamas (hard)
Bahamas	3
Colombia	2

First Round
Argentina
bye
Viña del Mar, Chile (clay)
Canada	1
Chile	4
Lima, Peru (clay)
Bahamas	1
Peru	4
Bogotá, Colombia (clay)
Colombia	0
Ecuador	5

Second Round
Santiago, Chile (indoor hard)
Argentina	0
Chile	2
Lima, Peru (clay)
Peru	2
Ecuador	3

- Colombia relegated to Group II in 2001.
- Chile and Ecuador advance to World Group qualifying round.

== First round ==
=== Chile vs. Canada ===
Chile
4
Club de Tenis Unión, Viña del Mar, Chile
4–6 February 2000
Clay

Canada
1

			1	2	3	4	5
1	(Chile) (Canada)	Fernando González; Sébastien Lareau	2; 6	6; 3	1; 6	6; 2	6; 1
2	(Chile) (Canada)	Nicolás Massú; Simon Larose	6; 0	6^{2} 7^{7}	3; 1			retired
3	(Chile) (Canada)	Fernando González / Nicolás Massú; Sébastien Lareau / Jocelyn Robichaud	6; 4	6; 4	2; 6	6; 2
4	(Chile) (Canada)	Adrián García; Frédéric Niemeyer	6; 4	1; 6	6^{6} 7^{8}
5	(Chile) (Canada)	Hermes Gamonal; Simon Larose	6; 2	7; 5

=== Peru vs. Bahamas ===
Peru
4
Club Lawn Tennis de la Exposición, Lima, Peru
4–6 February 2000
Clay

Bahamas
1

			1	2	3	4	5
1	(Peru) (The Bahamas)	Américo Venero; Mark Knowles	6; 4	6; 4	3; 6	3; 1		retired
2	(Peru) (The Bahamas)	Luis Horna; Mark Merklein	6; 4	6; 4	6; 4
3	(Peru) (The Bahamas)	Luis Horna / Américo Venero; Mark Knowles / Mark Merklein	3; 6	2; 6	2; 4			retired
4	(Peru) (The Bahamas)	Luis Horna; Mark Knowles	6; 2	2; 6	6; 4	3; 1		retired
5	(Peru) (The Bahamas)	Iván Miranda; Dentry Mortimer	6; 1	6; 0

=== Colombia vs. Ecuador ===
Colombia
0
Club Campestre El Rancho, Bogotá, Colombia
4–6 February 2000
Clay

Ecuador
5

			1	2	3	4	5
1	(Colombia) (Ecuador)	Eduardo Rincón; Luis Morejón	6; 2	5; 7	5; 7	6; 2	0; 6
2	(Colombia) (Ecuador)	Pablo González; Nicolás Lapentti	6; 4	4; 6	6^{12} 7^{14}	6^{3} 7^{7}
3	(Colombia) (Ecuador)	Pablo González / Rubén Torres; Andrés Gómez / Nicolás Lapentti	2; 6	4; 6	0; 6
4	(Colombia) (Ecuador)	Rubén Torres; Giovanni Lapentti	6^{2} 7^{7}	1; 6
5	(Colombia) (Ecuador)	Pablo González; Luis Morejón	7^{9} 6^{7}	4; 6	6^{4} 7^{7}

== Second round ==
=== Chile vs. Argentina ===
Chile
2
Cúpula Parque O'Higgins, Santiago, Chile
7–9 April 2000
Hard (indoors)

Argentina
0

			1	2	3	4	5
1	(Chile) (Argentina)	Marcelo Ríos; Hernán Gumy	6; 4	6; 3	4; 6	6; 1
2	(Chile) (Argentina)	Nicolás Massú; Mariano Zabaleta	5; 7	6; 2	6^{1} 7^{7}	1; 3		retired
3	(Chile) (Argentina)	Fernando González / Nicolás Massú; Mariano Hood / Sebastián Prieto						w/o
4	(Chile) (Argentina)	Marcelo Ríos; Mariano Zabaleta						w/o
5	(Chile) (Argentina)	Nicolás Massú; Hernán Gumy						w/o

=== Peru vs. Ecuador ===
Peru
2
Club Lawn Tennis de la Exposición, Lima, Peru
6–8 April 2000
Clay

Ecuador
3

			1	2	3	4	5
1	(Peru) (Ecuador)	Luis Horna; Giovanni Lapentti	2; 6	6; 3	6; 4	6; 1
2	(Peru) (Ecuador)	Iván Miranda; Nicolás Lapentti	1; 6	2; 6	2; 6
3	(Peru) (Ecuador)	Luis Horna / Américo Venero; Andrés Gómez / Nicolás Lapentti	6; 2	6; 2	2; 6	6^{3} 7^{7}	7; 5
4	(Peru) (Ecuador)	Luis Horna; Nicolás Lapentti	6; 4	2; 6	5; 7	7^{7} 6^{2}	3; 6
5	(Peru) (Ecuador)	Américo Venero; Luis Morejón	3; 6	6; 3	2; 6	1; 6

== First round play-offs ==
=== Canada vs. Argentina ===
Canada
4
Jarry Park Stadium, Montreal, Canada
21–23 July 2000
Hard

Argentina
1

			1	2	3	4	5
1	(Canada) (Argentina)	Daniel Nestor; Juan Ignacio Chela	6; 3	7^{7} 6^{3}	6; 3
2	(Canada) (Argentina)	Sébastien Lareau; Agustín Calleri	3; 6	2; 6	3; 6
3	(Canada) (Argentina)	Sébastien Lareau / Daniel Nestor; Martín García / Martín Rodríguez	6; 2	6; 1	6; 3
4	(Canada) (Argentina)	Sébastien Lareau; Juan Ignacio Chela	6; 3	6; 4	4; 6	2; 6	6; 4
5	(Canada) (Argentina)	Daniel Nestor; Agustín Calleri	6; 3	6; 2

=== Bahamas vs. Colombia ===
Bahamas
3
Queen Elizabeth Sports Centre, Nassau, Bahamas
21–23 July 2000
Hard

Colombia
2

			1	2	3	4	5
1	(The Bahamas) (Colombia)	Mark Knowles; Carlos Drada	7^{7} 6^{5}	7; 5	2; 2			retired
2	(The Bahamas) (Colombia)	Mark Merklein; Eduardo Rincón	6; 4	6; 4	6; 4
3	(The Bahamas) (Colombia)	Mark Knowles / Mark Merklein; Carlos Drada / Pablo González	6; 1	6; 4	6; 2
4	(The Bahamas) (Colombia)	Roger Smith; Eduardo Rincón	6^{1} 7^{7}	6; 4	6; 1	1; 6	1; 6
5	(The Bahamas) (Colombia)	Mark Merklein; Pablo González	7; 5	7^{7} 6^{4}	6; 3

== Second round play-offs ==
=== Colombia vs. Argentina ===
Colombia
1
Centro de Alto Rendimiento, Bogotá, Colombia
6–8 October 2000
Clay

Argentina
4

			1	2	3	4	5
1	(Colombia) (Argentina)	Eduardo Rincón; Franco Squillari	4; 6	2; 6	2; 6
2	(Colombia) (Argentina)	Pablo González; Mariano Puerta	0; 6	2; 6	6; 3	0; 6
3	(Colombia) (Argentina)	Pablo González / Michael Quintero; Martín García / Mariano Puerta	4; 6	5; 7	2; 6
4	(Colombia) (Argentina)	Pablo González; Agustín Calleri	3; 6	1; 6
5	(Colombia) (Argentina)	Michael Quintero; Martín García	7; 5	2; 6	6; 3
