= Eduardo Rincón =

Colombian tennis player

- Country (sports): Colombia
- Born: 22 March 1976 (age 49)
- Plays: Right-handed
- Prize money: $12,572

Singles
- Career record: 0–1
- Highest ranking: No. 564 (14 Apr 1997)

Doubles
- Career record: 0–1
- Highest ranking: No. 618 (29 Jul 1996)

Eduardo Rincón (born 22 March 1976) is a Colombian former professional tennis player.

Born in 1976, Rincón grew up on a farm near the city of Duitama and is one of five siblings. His elder brother is tennis player Mario Rincón.

As a professional player he competed mostly at satellite and Challenger level, with an ATP Tour main draw appearance at the 1997 Colombian Open, where he lost in the first round to Vince Spadea.

From 1997 to 2001 he was a member of the Colombia Davis Cup team and featured in nine singles rubbers, for wins over Luis Horna (Peru), Roger Smith (Bahamas) and Pablo Bianchi (Uruguay).

Rincón, a two-time All-American at Valdosta State, now works as a coach in collegiate tennis.

== ITF Futures titles ==
=== Doubles: (1) ===
No.	Date	Tournament	Surface	Partner	Opponents	Score
1.	Oct 1998	Bolivia F3, Santa Cruz	Clay	(Chile) Sebastian Contador	(United States) Keith Brill (Paraguay) Paulo Carvallo	4–6, 6–3, 6–2
