= Colombia Davis Cup team =

National sports team

Colombia
- Captain: Pablo González
- ITF ranking: 17 ▲2 (6 December 2021)
- Colors: blue & white
- First year: 1959
- Years played: 51
- Ties played (W–L): 107 (56–51)
- Best finish: WG Play-offs (2010, 2013, 2014, 2015, 2017, 2018)
- Most total wins: Mauricio Hadad (35–11)
- Most singles wins: Santiago Giraldo (26–12)
- Most doubles wins: Mauricio Hadad (12–6); Miguel Tobón (12–8)
- Best doubles team: Juan Sebastián Cabal/Robert Farah (9–5)
- Most ties played: Alejandro Falla (27)
- Most years played: Alejandro Falla (15)

The Colombia men's national tennis team represents Colombia in the Davis Cup and is governed by the Federación Colombiana de Tenis.

Colombia currently competes in the David Cup Finals, formerly known as the World Group. In 2018, they have reached the Play-offs to the World Group for the sixth time. For the first time in its history, Colombia advanced to the World Group, winning 4–0 to Sweden in the Play-off in 2019 Davis Cup.

== History ==
Colombia competed in its first Davis Cup in 1959 Davis Cup.

== Current team (2024) ==
- Daniel Elahi Galán (singles)
- Nicolás Mejía (singles)
- Adrià Soriano Barrera (singles)
- Nicolás Barrientos (doubles)
- Cristian Rodríguez (doubles)

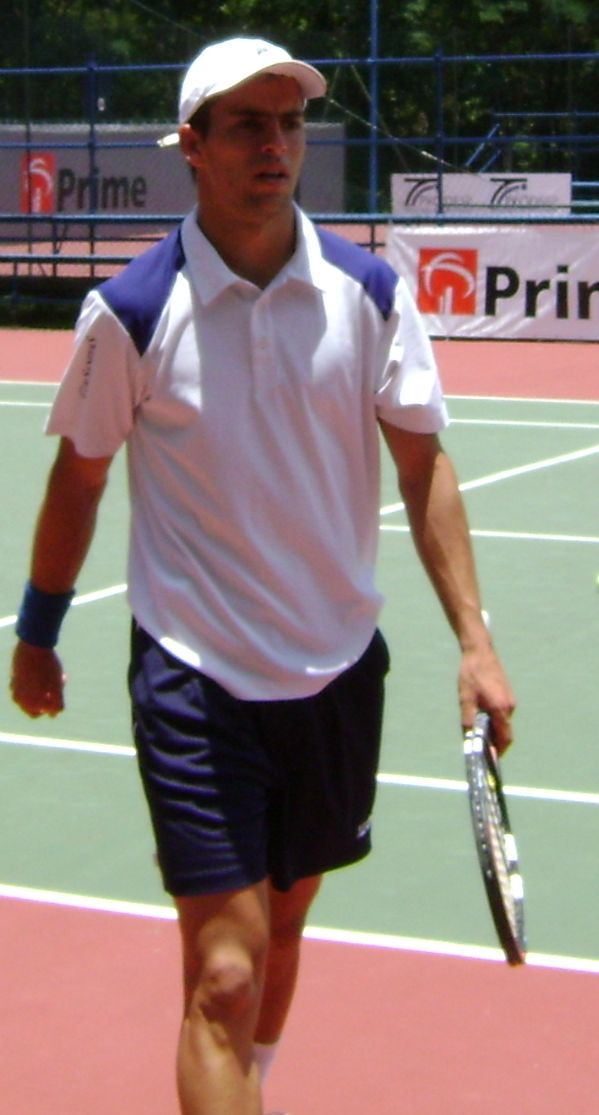
Santiago Giraldo

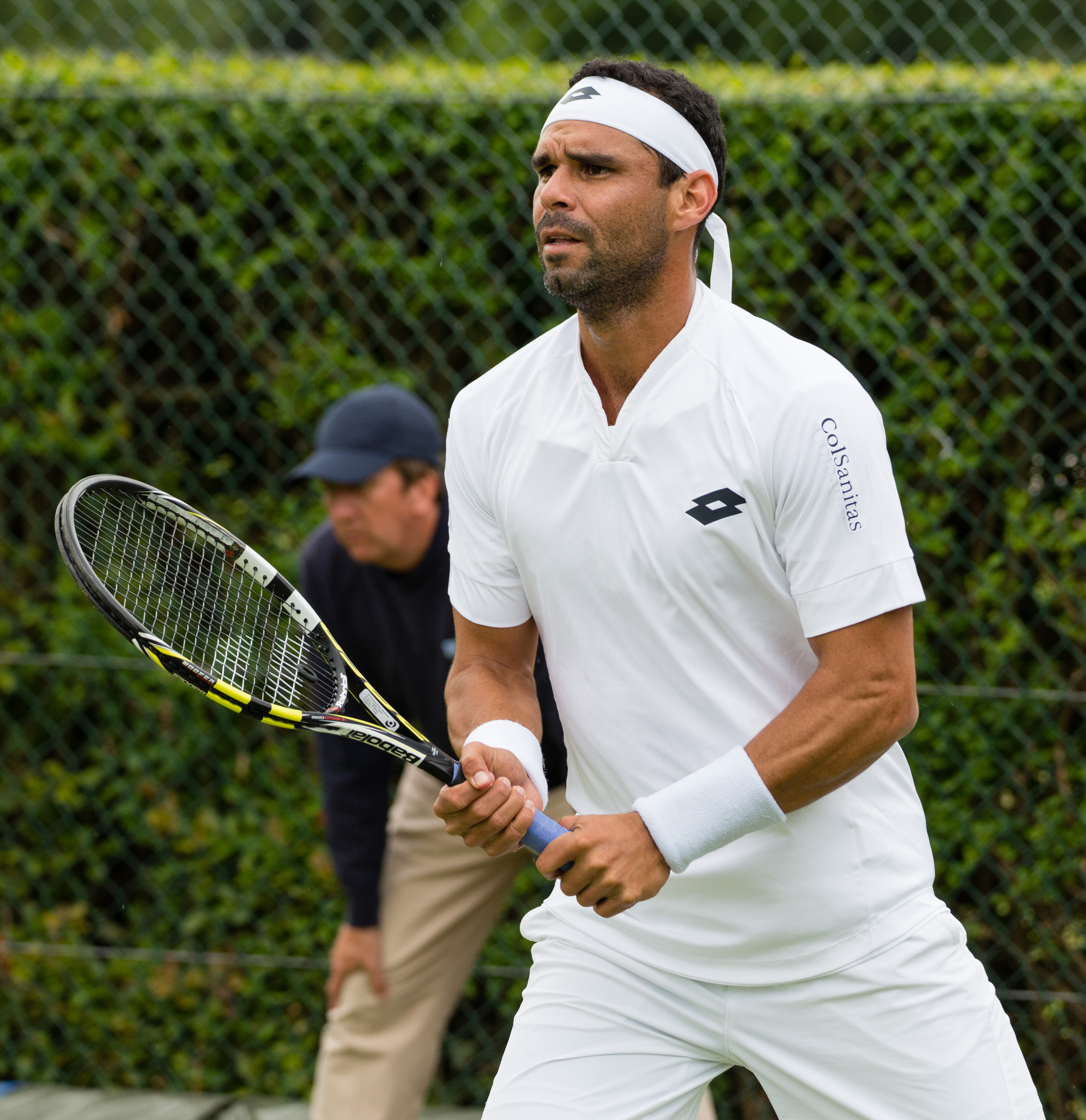
Alejandro Falla

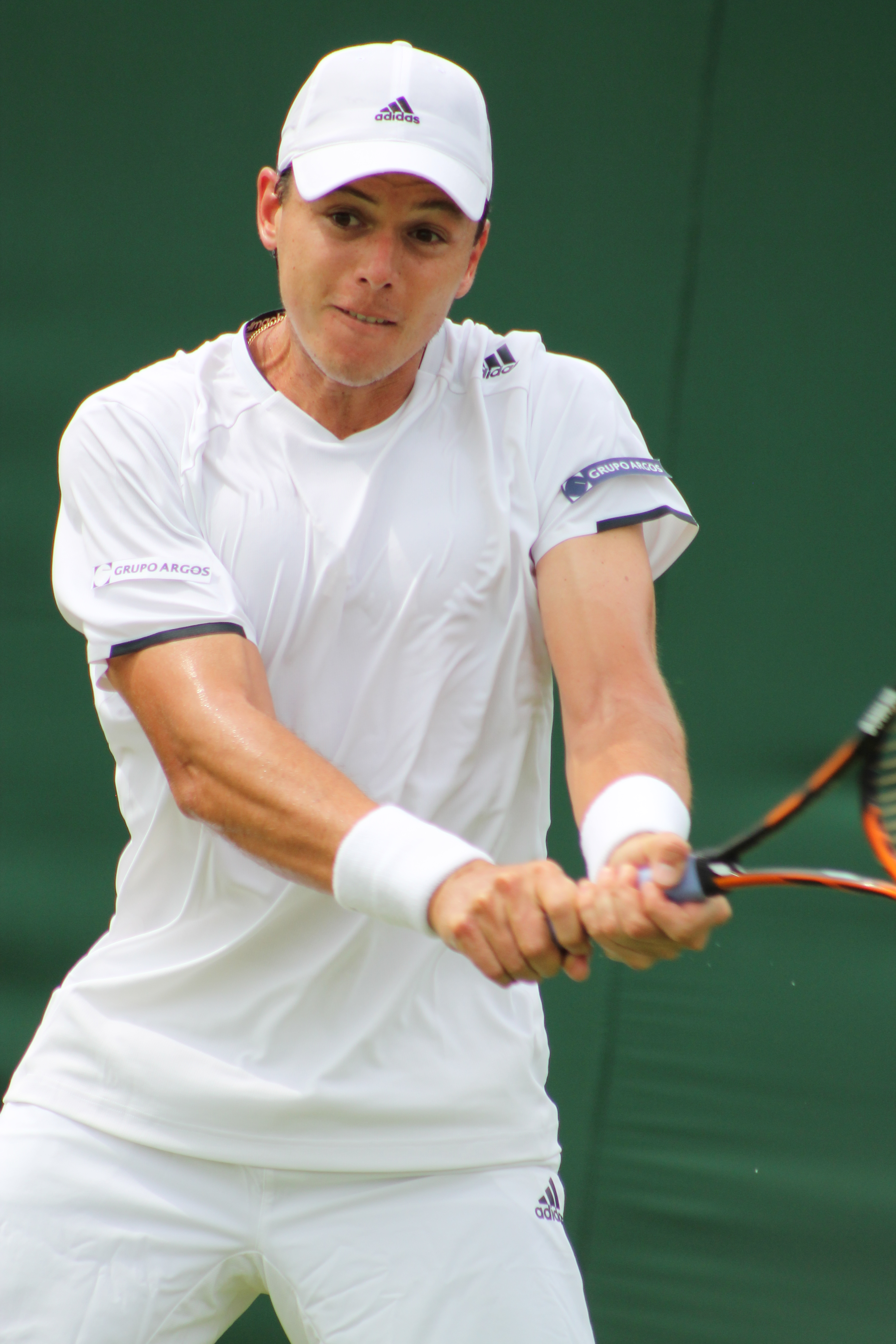
Alejandro González

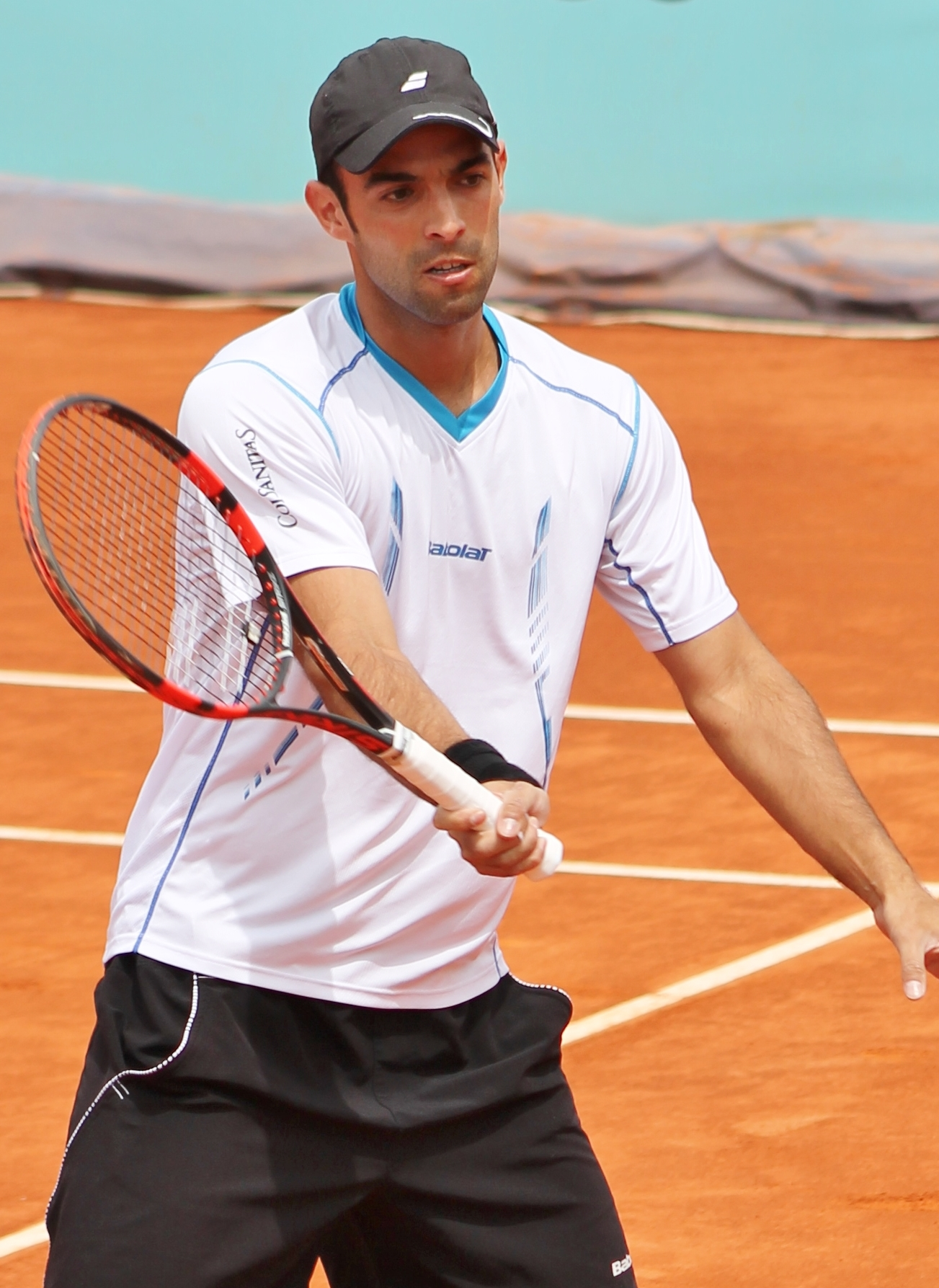
Juan Sebastián Cabal

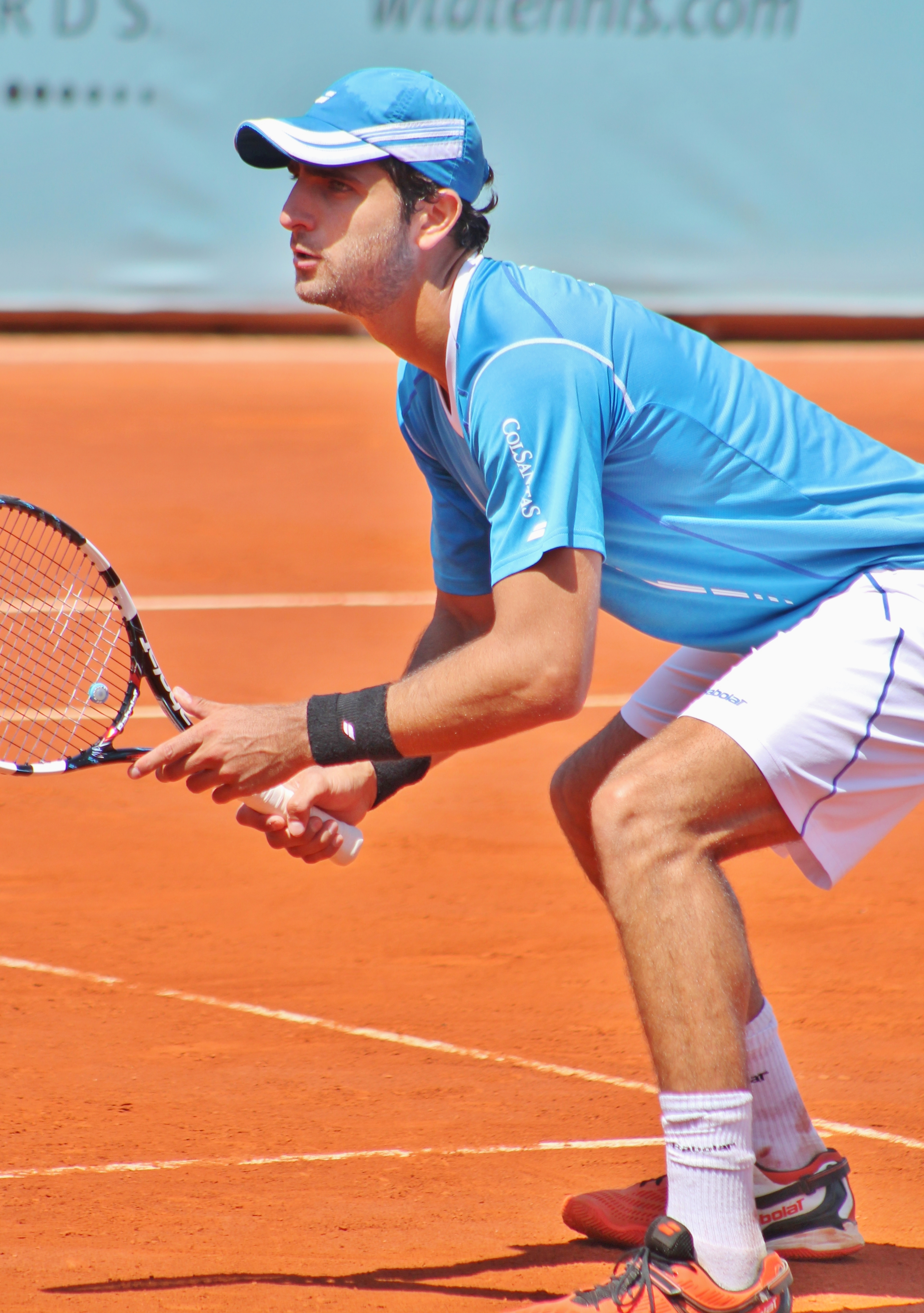
Robert Farah

== Results ==
Year	#	Competition	Date	Location	Opponent	Score	Result
1959	1	1959 Davis Cup	May 1–3	Beirut, Lebanon	Lebanon	4–1	European Round Round I
1959	2	1959 Davis Cup	May 14–16	Bournemouth, England	South Africa	0–5	European Round Round I
1961	3	1961 Davis Cup	April 29 – May 1	Guayaquil, Ecuador	Ecuador	0–5	First round
1969	4	1969 Davis Cup	May 2–5	Caracas, Venezuela	Venezuela	3–2	First round
1969	5	1969 Davis Cup	May 16–18	Bogotá, Colombia	Brazil	2–3	Second round
1970	6	1970 Davis Cup	April 4–6	Bogotá, Colombia	Ecuador	3–2	First round
1970	7	1970 Davis Cup	April 11–13	Bogotá, Colombia	Uruguay	5–0	Second round
1970	8	1970 Davis Cup	June 14–16	Bogotá, Colombia	Brazil	2–3	Third round
1971	9	1971 Davis Cup	March 19–21	Bogotá, Colombia	Chile	2–3	First round
1972	10	1972 Davis Cup	March 20–22	Guayaquil, Ecuador	Ecuador	4–1	First round
1972	11	1972 Davis Cup	April 8–10	Santiago, Chile	Chile	1–4	Second round
1973	12	1973 Davis Cup	February 23–25	Bogotá, Colombia	Canada	4–1	First round
1973	13	1973 Davis Cup	March 9–11	Bogotá, Colombia	West Indies	3–2	Second round
1973	14	1973 Davis Cup	March 23–25	Mexico City, Mexico	Mexico	0–5	Third round
1974	15	1974 Davis Cup	November 23–25	Bogotá, Colombia	Venezuela	3–2	First round
1974	16	1974 Davis Cup	December 7–9	Cali, Colombia	Mexico	4–1	Second round
1974	17	1974 Davis Cup	January 11–13	Bogotá, Colombia	United States	4–1	Third round
1974	18	1974 Davis Cup	May 10–12	Bogotá, Colombia	South Africa	2–3	Final Interzonal
1976	19	1976 Davis Cup	October 17–19	Montreal, Canada	Canada	0–5	First round
1977	20	1977 Davis Cup	October 8–10	Caracas, Venezuela	Venezuela	2–3	First round
1978	21	1978 Davis Cup	December 15–17	Johannesburg, South Africa	South Africa	1–4	First round
1979	22	1979 Davis Cup	October 27–29	Bogotá, Colombia	Venezuela	4–1	First round
1979	23	1979 Davis Cup	December 8–10	Mexico City, Mexico	Mexico	3–2	Second round
1979	24	1979 Davis Cup	March 16–18	Cleveland, United States	United States	0–5	Third round
1980	25	1980 Davis Cup	October 27–29	Caracas, Venezuela	Venezuela	1–4	First round
1981	26	1981 Davis Cup	January 9–11	Bogotá, Colombia	Canada	3–2	First round
1981	27	1981 Davis Cup	February 13–15	Caracas, Venezuela	Venezuela	5–0	Second round
1981	28	1981 Davis Cup	March 6–8	Bogotá, Colombia	Chile	2–3	Continue Group I
1982	29	1982 Davis Cup	June 22–24	Bogotá, Colombia	West Indies	5–0	First round
1982	30	1982 Davis Cup	March 5–7	Montreal, Canada	Canada	1–3	Second round
1983	31	1983 Davis Cup	March 4–6	Bogotá, Colombia	Brazil	0–5	First round
1984	32	1984 Davis Cup	January 13–15	Santiago, Chile	Chile	0–5	First round
1985	33	1985 Davis Cup	March 8–10	Montevideo, Uruguay	Uruguay	3–2	First round
1985	34	1985 Davis Cup	August 2–4	Porto Alegre, Brazil	Brazil	1–4	First round
1986	35	1986 Davis Cup	March 7–9	Bogotá, Colombia	Peru	0–4	First round
1987	36	1987 Davis Cup	Jan 30 – Febr. 1	Bogotá, Colombia	Uruguay	0–5	Relegated Group II
1988	37	1988 Davis Cup	February 5–7	Caracas, Venezuela	Venezuela	1–4	First round Group II
1989	38	1989 Davis Cup	February 3–5	Bogotá, Colombia	Cuba	1–4	First round Group II
1990	39	1990 Davis Cup	February 2–4	Cali, Colombia	Guatemala	4–1	First round Group II
1990	40	1990 Davis Cup	March 30 – April 1	Santo Domingo, Dominican Republic	Dominican Republic	4–1	Second round Group II
1990	41	1990 Davis Cup	June 15–17	Saint Peter, Barbados	Barbados	4–1	Third round Group II
1990	42	1990 Davis Cup	July 20–22	Havana, Cuba	Cuba	2–3	Continue Group II
1991	43	1991 Davis Cup	February 2–4	Kingston, Jamaica	Jamaica	3–2	First round Group II
1991	44	1991 Davis Cup	March 29–31	Saint John, West Indies	West Indies	5–0	Second round Group II
1991	45	1991 Davis Cup	July 19–21	Cali, Colombia	Bahamas	4–1	Third round Group II
1991	46	1991 Davis Cup	September 20–22	Medellín, Colombia	Chile	1–3	Continue Group II
1992	47	1992 Davis Cup	Jan 31 – Febr. 2	Cali, Colombia	Barbados	5–0	First round Group II
1992	48	1992 Davis Cup	March 27–29	Cali, Colombia	Venezuela	2–3	Continue Group II
1993	49	1993 Davis Cup	February 5–7	Lima, Peru	Peru	2–3	First round Group II
1993	50	1993 Davis Cup	March 26–28	Bogotá, Colombia	Dominican Republic	4–1	Continue Group II
1994	51	1994 Davis Cup	February 3–5	Guatemala City, Guatemala	Guatemala	5–0	First round Group II
1994	52	1994 Davis Cup	March 25–27	Bogotá, Colombia	Canada	2–3	Continue Group II
1995	53	1995 Davis Cup	February 3–5	Asunción, Paraguay	Paraguay	3–2	First round Group II
1995	54	1995 Davis Cup	March 31 – April 2	Kelowna, Canada	Canada	0–5	Continue Group II
1996	55	1996 Davis Cup	February 9–11	Bogotá, Colombia	Puerto Rico	5–0	First round Group II
1996	56	1996 Davis Cup	September 20–22	Montevideo, Uruguay	Uruguay	2–3	Continue Group II
1997	57	1997 Davis Cup	February 7–9	San Juan, Puerto Rico	Puerto Rico	3–2	First round Group II
1997	58	1997 Davis Cup	April 4–6	Cali, Colombia	Peru	5–0	Second round Group II
1997	59	1997 Davis Cup	September 19–21	Bogotá, Colombia	Uruguay	4–1	Advanced Group I
1998	60	1998 Davis Cup	February 13–15	Buenos Aires, Argentina	Argentina	0–5	First round Group I
1998	61	1998 Davis Cup	April 2–4	Santiago, Chile	Chile	0–5	Second round Group I
1998	62	1998 Davis Cup	September 25–27	Cali, Colombia	Mexico	3–2	First round Group I
1999	63	1999 Davis Cup	February 12–14	Cali, Colombia	Canada	3–2	First round Group I
1999	64	1999 Davis Cup	April 2–4	Bogotá, Colombia	Chile	0–5	Continue Group I
2000	65	2000 Davis Cup	February 4–6	Bogotá, Colombia	Ecuador	0–5	First round Group I
2000	66	2000 Davis Cup	July 21–23	Nassau, The Bahamas	Bahamas	2–3	Second round Group I
2000	67	2000 Davis Cup	October 6–8	Bogotá, Colombia	Argentina	1–4	Relegated Group II
2001	68	2001 Davis Cup	February 9–11	Montevideo, Uruguay	Uruguay	1–3	First round Group II
2001	69	2001 Davis Cup	April 6–8	Bogotá, Colombia	Costa Rica	5–0	Continue Group II
2002	70	2002 Davis Cup	February 8–10	Villavicencio, Colombia	Cuba	5–0	First round Group II
2002	71	2002 Davis Cup	April 5–7	Villavicencio, Colombia	Uruguay	2–3	Continue Group II
2003	72	2003 Davis Cup	February 7–9	La Habana, Cuba	Cuba	0–5	First round Group II
2003	73	2003 Davis Cup	April 4–6	Montevideo, Uruguay	Uruguay	2–3	Relegated Group III
2004	74	2004 Davis Cup	February 4	Tegucigalpa, Honduras	Honduras	3–0	First round Group III
2004	75	2004 Davis Cup	February 5	Tegucigalpa, Honduras	Panama	3–0	First round Group III
2004	76	2004 Davis Cup	February 6	Tegucigalpa, Honduras	Bolivia	3–0	First round Group III
2004	77	2004 Davis Cup	February 7	Tegucigalpa, Honduras	Netherlands Antilles	3–0	Second round Group III
2004	78	2004 Davis Cup	February 8	Tegucigalpa, Honduras	El Salvador	3–0	Advanced Group II
2005	79	2005 Davis Cup	March 4–6	Bogotá, Colombia	Brazil	0–5	First round Group II
2005	80	2005 Davis Cup	July 15–17	Bogotá, Colombia	Bahamas	5–0	Continue Group II
2006	81	2006 Davis Cup	February 10–12	Bogotá, Colombia	Uruguay	4–1	First round Group II
2006	82	2006 Davis Cup	April 7–9	Bogotá, Colombia	Paraguay	4–1	Second round Group II
2006	83	2006 Davis Cup	April 7–9	Santo Domingo, Dominican Republic	Dominican Republic	5–0	Advanced Group I
2007	84	2007 Davis Cup	February 9–11	Calgary, Canada	Canada	0–5	First round Group I
2007	85	2007 Davis Cup	September 21–23	Valencia, Venezuela	Venezuela	4–1	Continue Group I
2008	86	2008 Davis Cup	February 8–10	Punta del Este, Uruguay	Uruguay	3–2	First round Group I
2008	87	2008 Davis Cup	April 11–13	Sorocaba, Brazil	Brazil	1–4	Continue Group I
2009	88	2009 Davis Cup	March 8–10	Bogotá, Colombia	Uruguay	5–0	First round Group I
2009	89	2009 Davis Cup	May 8–10	Tunja, Colombia	Brazil	1–4	Continue Group I
2010	90	2010 Davis Cup	March 5–7	Bogotá, Colombia	Canada	4–1	World Group play-offs
2010	91	2010 Davis Cup	September 17–19	Bogotá, Colombia	United States	1–3	Continue Group I
2011	92	2011 Davis Cup	April 4–6	Montevideo, Uruguay	Uruguay	1–4	Continue Group I
2011	93	2011 Davis Cup	October 28–30	Mexico City, Mexico	Mexico	5–0	First round Group I
2012	94	2012 Davis Cup	February 10–12	Salinas, Ecuador	Ecuador	4–1	First round Group I
2012	95	2012 Davis Cup	April 4–6	São José do Rio Preto, Brazil	Brazil	1–4	Second round Group I
2013	96	2013 Davis Cup	April 4–6	Bogotá, Colombia	Uruguay	5–0	World Group play-offs
2013	97	2013 Davis Cup	September 13–15	Tokyo, Japan	Japan	2–3	Continue Group I
2014	98	2014 Davis Cup	April 4–6	Cali, Colombia	Dominican Republic	4–1	World Group play-offs
2014	99	2014 Davis Cup	September 12–14	Halifax, Canada	Canada	2–3	Continue Group I
2015	100	2015 Davis Cup	March 6–8	Montevideo, Uruguay	Uruguay	3–2	World Group play-offs
2015	101	2015 Davis Cup	September 18–20	Pereira, Colombia	Japan	2–3	Continue Group I
2016	102	2016 Davis Cup	July 15–18	Iquique, Chile	Chile	1–3	Second round Group I
2016	103	2016 Davis Cup	September 16–18	Santiago de los Caballeros, Dominican Republic	Dominican Republic	4–1	Continue Group I
2017	104	2017 Davis Cup	April 7–9	Medellín, Colombia	Chile	3–1	World Group play-offs
2017	105	2017 Davis Cup	September 15–17	Bogotá, Colombia	Croatia	1–4	Continue Group I
2018	106	2018 Davis Cup	February 2–3	Saint Michael, Barbados	Barbados	4–0	Second round Group I
2018	107	2018 Davis Cup	April 6–7	Barranquilla, Colombia	Brazil	3–2	World Group play-offs
2018	108	2018 Davis Cup	September 14–16	San Juan, Argentina	Argentina	0–4	World Group play-offs
2019	109	2019 Davis Cup	February 2–3	Bogotá, Colombia	Sweden	4–0	World Group
2019	110	2019 Davis Cup Finals	November 18	Madrid, Spain	Belgium	1–2	World Group play-offs
2019	111	2019 Davis Cup Finals	November 19	Madrid, Spain	Australia	0–3	World Group play-offs
2020	112	2020 Davis Cup	6–7 March 2020	Bogotá, Colombia	Argentina	3–1	2021 Davis Cup Finals

== See also ==
- Billie Jean King Cup
- Colombia Billie Jean King Cup team
