= 2011 Davis Cup Americas Zone Group I =

International tennis competition

The Americas Zone is one of the three zones of regional Davis Cup competition in 2011.

In the Americas Zone there are four different groups in which teams compete against each other to advance to the next group.

== Participating teams ==
Sneeds:

1. Ecuador
2. Brazil

Remaining nations:

- Canada
- Colombia
- Mexico
- Uruguay

== Draw ==
Second-round play-offs
Mexico City, Mexico (clay)
Mexico | 0
Colombia | 5

First-round play-offs
Guayaquil, Ecuador (clay)
1 | Ecuador | 3
Mexico | 2
Colombia
bye

First Round
1 | Ecuador
bye
Metepec, Mexico (clay)
Mexico | 1
Canada | 4
Montevideo, Uruguay (clay)
Uruguay | 4
Colombia | 1
bye
2 | Brazil

Second Round
Guayaquil, Ecuador (clay)
1 | Ecuador | 2
Canada | 3
Montevideo, Uruguay (clay)
Uruguay | 0
2 | Brazil | 5

- Mexico relegated to Group II in 2012.
- Canada and Brazil advance to World Group play-off.

== First round matches ==
=== Mexico vs. Canada ===
Mexico
1
Club Deportivo La Asuncion, Metepec, Mexico
4–6 March 2011
clay (outdoor)

Canada
4

| | | | 1 | 2 | 3 | 4 | 5 |
|---|---|---|---|---|---|---|---|
| 1 | (Mexico) (Canada) | Daniel Garza; Frank Dancevic | 2; 6 | 4; 6 | 6; 2 | 6; 3 | 6; 4 |
| 2 | (Mexico) (Canada) | Manuel Sánchez; Milos Raonic | 2; 6 | 2; 6 | 1; 6 |
| 3 | (Mexico) (Canada) | Luis Díaz-Barriga / Miguel Ángel Reyes-Varela; Vasek Pospisil / Milos Raonic | 6; 4 | 3; 6 | 4; 6 | 4; 6 |
| 4 | (Mexico) (Canada) | Daniel Garza; Milos Raonic | 5; 7 | 3; 6 | 2; 6 |
| 5 | (Mexico) (Canada) | Manuel Sánchez; Peter Polansky | 4; 6 | 1; 6 |

=== Uruguay vs. Colombia ===
Uruguay
4
Carrasco Lawn Tennis Club, Montevideo, Uruguay
4–6 March 2011
clay (outdoor)

Colombia
1

| | | | 1 | 2 | 3 | 4 | 5 |
|---|---|---|---|---|---|---|---|
| 1 | (Uruguay) (Colombia) | Pablo Cuevas; Alejandro Falla | 2; 6 | 6; 1 | 6; 2 | 6; 4 |
| 2 | (Uruguay) (Colombia) | Martín Cuevas; Santiago Giraldo | 2; 6 | 0; 6 | 2; 6 |
| 3 | (Uruguay) (Colombia) | Pablo Cuevas / Marcel Felder; Juan Sebastián Cabal / Robert Farah | 1; 6 | 7^{8} 6^{6} | 1; 6 | 7^{7} 6^{5} | 6; 2 |
| 4 | (Uruguay) (Colombia) | Pablo Cuevas; Santiago Giraldo | 6; 2 | 6; 3 | 6; 4 |
| 5 | (Uruguay) (Colombia) | Marcel Felder; Alejandro Falla | 7^{7} 6^{3} | 6^{2} 7^{7} | 6; 3 |

== Second round matches ==
=== Ecuador vs. Canada ===
Ecuador
2
Guayaquil Tenis Club, Guayaquil, Ecuador
8–10 July 2011
clay

Canada
3

| | | | 1 | 2 | 3 | 4 | 5 |
|---|---|---|---|---|---|---|---|
| 1 | (Ecuador) (Canada) | Iván Endara; Vasek Pospisil | 6; 3 | 6; 4 | 6^{6} 7^{8} | 6; 3 |
| 2 | (Ecuador) (Canada) | Júlio César Campozano; Philip Bester | 7^{7} 6^{4} | 6^{4} 7^{7} | 7; 5 | 6; 2 |
| 3 | (Ecuador) (Canada) | Emilio Gómez / Roberto Quiroz; Daniel Nestor / Vasek Pospisil | 6^{4} 7^{7} | 4; 6 | 5; 7 |
| 4 | (Ecuador) (Canada) | Júlio César Campozano; Vasek Pospisil | 3; 6 | 4; 6 | 5; 7 |
| 5 | (Ecuador) (Canada) | Iván Endara; Philip Bester | 2; 6 | 6^{4} 7^{7} | 4; 6 |

=== Uruguay vs. Brazil ===
Uruguay
0
Carrasco Lawn Tennis Club, Montevideo, Uruguay
8–10 July 2011
clay

Brazil
5

| | | | 1 | 2 | 3 | 4 | 5 |
|---|---|---|---|---|---|---|---|
| 1 | (Uruguay) (Brazil) | Marcel Felder; Rogério Dutra da Silva | 2; 6 | 2; 6 | 3; 6 |
| 2 | (Uruguay) (Brazil) | Martín Cuevas; Thomaz Bellucci | 1; 6 | 4; 6 | 5; 7 |
| 3 | (Uruguay) (Brazil) | Martín Cuevas / Marcel Felder; Thomaz Bellucci / Bruno Soares | 4; 6 | 3; 6 | 3; 6 |
| 4 | (Uruguay) (Brazil) | Ariel Behar; Bruno Soares | 2; 6 | 2; 6 |
| 5 | (Uruguay) (Brazil) | Martín Cuevas; Rogério Dutra da Silva | 3; 6 | 6^{4} 7^{7} |

== First-round play-offs ==
=== Ecuador vs. Mexico ===
Ecuador
3
Guayaquil Tenis Club, Guayaquil, Ecuador
16–19 September 2011
clay (outdoor)

Mexico
2

| | | | 1 | 2 | 3 | 4 | 5 |
|---|---|---|---|---|---|---|---|
| 1 | (Ecuador) (Mexico) | Júlio César Campozano; Miguel Gallardo-Vallés | 6; 2 | 4; 6 | 6; 3 | 6; 2 |
| 2 | (Ecuador) (Mexico) | Iván Endara; Daniel Garza | 6^{4} 7^{7} | 7^{7} 6^{0} | 6; 4 | 2; 6 | 6; 4 |
| 3 | (Ecuador) (Mexico) | Júlio César Campozano / Roberto Quiroz; Santiago González / Daniel Garza | 2; 6 | 7^{7} 6^{4} | 3; 6 | 4; 6 |
| 4 | (Ecuador) (Mexico) | Júlio César Campozano; Daniel Garza | 6; 0 | 6; 3 | 6; 1 |
| 5 | (Ecuador) (Mexico) | Juan-Sebastián Vivanco; Miguel Gallardo-Vallés | 3; 6 | 3; 6 |

== Second-round play-offs ==
=== Mexico vs. Colombia ===
Mexico
0
Rafael Osuna Stadium, Mexico City, Mexico
28–30 October 2011
clay (outdoor)

Colombia
5

| | | | 1 | 2 | 3 | 4 | 5 |
|---|---|---|---|---|---|---|---|
| 1 | (Mexico) (Colombia) | Santiago González; Santiago Giraldo | 4; 6 | 6^{5} 7^{7} | 2; 6 |
| 2 | (Mexico) (Colombia) | César Ramírez; Alejandro Falla | 6; 1 | 1; 6 | 1; 6 | 3; 6 |
| 3 | (Mexico) (Colombia) | Santiago González / César Ramírez; Juan Sebastián Cabal / Robert Farah | 6^{6} 7^{8} | 6; 4 | 4; 6 | 3; 6 |
| 4 | (Mexico) (Colombia) | Luis Díaz-Barriga; Robert Farah | 2; 6 | 3; 6 |
| 5 | (Mexico) (Colombia) | Marco Nunez; Juan Sebastián Cabal | 1; 6 | 2; 6 |
