= 2014 Davis Cup Americas Zone Group I =

International tennis competition

The Americas Zone is one of the three zones of regional Davis Cup competition in 2014.

In the Americas Zone there are three different groups in which teams compete against each other to advance to the next group.

== Participating nations ==
Seeds:

1. Brazil
2. Colombia

Remaining Nations

- Dominican Republic
- Ecuador
- Uruguay
- Venezuela

=== Draw ===
Second Round Play-offs
Caracas, Venezuela (hard)
Venezuela	1
Uruguay	4

First Round Play-offs
bye
Venezuela
Uruguay
bye

First Round
1	Brazil
bye
Guayaquil, Ecuador (clay)
Ecuador	3
Venezuela	2
Santo Domingo Este, Dominican Republic (hard)
Dominican Republic	4
Uruguay	0
bye
2	Colombia

Second Round
Guayaquil, Ecuador (clay)
1	Brazil	3
Ecuador	1
Cali, Colombia (clay)
Dominican Republic	1
2	Colombia	4

- Venezuela relegated to Group II in 2015.
- Brazil and Colombia advance to World Group Play-off.

== First round ==
=== Ecuador vs. Venezuela ===
Ecuador
3
Francisco Segura Cano, Guayaquil, Ecuador
31 January – 2 February 2014
Clay

Venezuela
2

			1	2	3	4	5
1	(Ecuador) (Venezuela)	Julio César Campozano; David Souto	6; 3	6^{5} 7^{7}	4; 6	6; 4	6; 2
2	(Ecuador) (Venezuela)	Emilio Gómez; Ricardo Rodríguez	6; 0	6; 3	6; 4
3	(Ecuador) (Venezuela)	Emilio Gómez / Giovanni Lapentti; Luis David Martínez / Roberto Maytín	2; 6	6; 4	3; 6	2; 6
4	(Ecuador) (Venezuela)	Emilio Gómez; David Souto	6; 1	6; 1	6; 1
5	(Ecuador) (Venezuela)	Gonzalo Escobar; Ricardo Rodríguez	7; 5	4; 6	2; 6

=== Dominican Republic vs. Uruguay ===
Dominican Republic
4
Centro Nacional de Tenis Parque del Este, Santo Domingo Este, Dominican Republic
31 January – 2 February 2014
Hard

Uruguay
0

			1	2	3	4	5
1	(Dominican Republic) (Uruguay)	José Hernández; Martín Cuevas	6; 3	7^{7} 6^{3}	6; 3
2	(Dominican Republic) (Uruguay)	Víctor Estrella; Ariel Behar	6; 3	6; 4	6; 4
3	(Dominican Republic) (Uruguay)	Víctor Estrella / José Hernández; Ariel Behar / Martín Cuevas	6; 3	6; 2	6; 3
4	(Dominican Republic) (Uruguay)	José Olivares; Rodrigo Senattore	5; 7	6; 1	7; 5
5	(Dominican Republic) (Uruguay)	William Kirkman; Santiago Maresca						not played

== Second round ==
=== Ecuador vs. Brazil ===
Ecuador
1
Francisco Segura Cano, Guayaquil, Ecuador
4–6 April 2014
Clay

Brazil
3

			1	2	3	4	5
1	(Ecuador) (Brazil)	Julio César Campozano; Rogério Dutra Silva	4; 6	6; 2	4; 6	4; 6
2	(Ecuador) (Brazil)	Emilio Gómez; Guilherme Clezar	6; 7	6; 4	1; 1			retired
3	(Ecuador) (Brazil)	Gonzalo Escobar / Giovanni Lapentti; Marcelo Melo / Bruno Soares	2; 6	0; 6	3; 6
4	(Ecuador) (Brazil)	Emilio Gómez; Rogério Dutra Silva	4; 6	7^{12} 6^{10}	1; 6	1; 6
5	(Ecuador) (Brazil)	Julio César Campozano; Guilherme Clezar						not played

=== Colombia vs. Dominican Republic ===
Colombia
4
Estadio de Tenis Alvaro Carlos Jordan, Cali, Colombia
4–6 April 2014
Clay

Dominican Republic
1

			1	2	3	4	5
1	(Colombia) (Dominican Republic)	Santiago Giraldo; José Hernández	6; 2	4; 6	6; 4	6^{3} 7^{7}	6; 2
2	(Colombia) (Dominican Republic)	Alejandro Falla; Víctor Estrella	4; 6	6; 2	5; 7	6; 2	6; 2
3	(Colombia) (Dominican Republic)	Juan Sebastián Cabal / Robert Farah; Víctor Estrella / José Hernández	6; 3	6; 2	6; 4
4	(Colombia) (Dominican Republic)	Robert Farah; Peter Bertran	6; 2	1; 6	4; 6
5	(Colombia) (Dominican Republic)	Juan Sebastián Cabal; José Olivares	6; 0	6; 1

== Second round playoffs ==
=== Venezuela vs. Uruguay ===
Venezuela
1
Cancha Central, Caracas, Venezuela
12–14 September 2014
Hard

Uruguay
4

			1	2	3	4	5
1	(Venezuela) (Uruguay)	Jesús Bandres; Pablo Cuevas	3; 6	2; 6	1; 6
2	(Venezuela) (Uruguay)	Ricardo Rodríguez; Martín Cuevas	5; 7	2; 6	3; 6
3	(Venezuela) (Uruguay)	Luis David Martínez / Roberto Maytín; Pablo Cuevas / Martín Cuevas	5; 7	2; 6	2; 6
4	(Venezuela) (Uruguay)	Ricardo Rodríguez; Ariel Behar	2; 1					retired
5	(Venezuela) (Uruguay)	Jesús Bandres; Rodrigo Senattore	6; 4	5; 7	3; 6
