= 2008 Davis Cup Americas Zone Group I =

International tennis competition

The Americas Zone is one of the three zones of regional Davis Cup competition in 2008.

In the Americas Zone there are three different groups in which teams compete against each other to advance to the next group.

== Participating nations ==
Seeds:

1. Chile
2. Brazil

Remaining Nations

- Canada
- Colombia
- Mexico
- Uruguay

== Draw ==
Second Round Play-offs
León, Mexico (indoor carpet)
Mexico | 2
Uruguay | 3

First Round Play-offs
bye
Mexico
Uruguay
bye

First Round
1 | Chile
bye
Calgary, Canada (indoor carpet)
Mexico | 1
Canada | 4
Punta del Este, Uruguay (clay)
Uruguay | 2
Colombia | 3
bye
2 | Brazil

Second Round
Santiago, Chile (clay)
1 | Chile | 3
Canada | 2
Sorocaba, Brazil (clay)
Colombia | 1
2 | Brazil | 4

- Mexico relegated to Group II in 2009.
- Chile and Brazil advance to World Group Play-off.

== First round ==
=== Canada vs. Mexico ===
Canada
4
The Corral at Stampede Park, Calgary, Canada
8 – 10 February 2008
Carpet (indoor)

Mexico
1

| | | | 1 | 2 | 3 | 4 | 5 |
|---|---|---|---|---|---|---|---|
| 1 | (Canada) (Mexico) | Frédéric Niemeyer; Santiago González | 6; 4 | 6; 4 | 7^{7} 6^{1} |
| 2 | (Canada) (Mexico) | Peter Polansky; Bruno Echagaray | 6; 3 | 7; 5 | 6; 2 |
| 3 | (Canada) (Mexico) | Daniel Nestor / Frédéric Niemeyer; Bruno Echagaray / Santiago González | 6; 4 | 6; 4 | 6; 4 |
| 4 | (Canada) (Mexico) | Vasek Pospisil; Bruno Rodríguez | 6; 2 | 1; 6 | 5; 7 |
| 5 | (Canada) (Mexico) | Peter Polansky; César Ramírez | 7^{8} 6^{6} | 7^{7} 6^{4} |

=== Uruguay vs. Colombia ===
Uruguay
2
Cantegril Country Club, Punta del Este, Uruguay
8 – 10 February 2008
Clay

Colombia
3

| | | | 1 | 2 | 3 | 4 | 5 |
|---|---|---|---|---|---|---|---|
| 1 | (Uruguay) (Colombia) | Marcel Felder; Alejandro Falla | 2; 6 | 5; 7 | 2; 6 |
| 2 | (Uruguay) (Colombia) | Pablo Cuevas; Santiago Giraldo | 6; 4 | 3; 6 | 5; 7 | 7^{8} 6^{6} | 6; 4 |
| 3 | (Uruguay) (Colombia) | Pablo Cuevas / Marcel Felder; Michael Quintero / Carlos Salamanca | 6; 4 | 6^{3} 7^{7} | 6; 3 | 6^{4} 7^{7} | 8; 6 |
| 4 | (Uruguay) (Colombia) | Pablo Cuevas; Alejandro Falla | 2; 6 | 3; 6 | 2; 6 |
| 5 | (Uruguay) (Colombia) | Marcel Felder; Santiago Giraldo | 2; 6 | 4; 6 | 6^{6} 7^{8} |

== Second round ==
=== Chile vs. Canada ===
Chile
3
Estadio Nacional, Santiago de Chile, Chile
11 – 13 April 2008
Clay

Canada
2

| | | | 1 | 2 | 3 | 4 | 5 |
|---|---|---|---|---|---|---|---|
| 1 | (Chile) (Canada) | Fernando González; Peter Polansky | 7^{7} 6^{4} | 7^{7} 6^{3} | 5; 7 | 6; 2 |
| 2 | (Chile) (Canada) | Nicolás Massú; Frédéric Niemeyer | 3; 6 | 6; 4 | 6; 4 | 5; 7 | 6; 3 |
| 3 | (Chile) (Canada) | Fernando González / Nicolás Massú; Daniel Nestor / Frédéric Niemeyer | 3; 6 | 6^{3} 7^{7} | 6; 3 | 7; 5 | 6; 4 |
| 4 | (Chile) (Canada) | Paul Capdeville; Frédéric Niemeyer | 3; 6 | 4; 6 |
| 5 | (Chile) (Canada) | Hans Podlipnik-Castillo; Peter Polansky | 3; 6 | 2; 6 |

=== Brazil vs. Colombia ===
Brazil
4
Tenis Clube de Sorocaba, Sorocaba, Brazil
11 – 13 April 2008
Clay

Colombia
1

| | | | 1 | 2 | 3 | 4 | 5 |
|---|---|---|---|---|---|---|---|---|
| 1 | (Brazil) (Colombia) | Thomaz Bellucci; Santiago Giraldo | 7^{8} 6^{6} | 6; 4 | 3; 6 | 4; 6 | 2; 6 |
| 2 | (Brazil) (Colombia) | Marcos Daniel; Juan Sebastián Cabal | 6; 1 | 5; 1 | | | | retired |
| 3 | (Brazil) (Colombia) | Marcelo Melo / André Sá; Michael Quintero / Carlos Salamanca | 6; 3 | 6; 3 | 6; 1 |
| 4 | (Brazil) (Colombia) | Marcos Daniel; Santiago Giraldo | 6; 4 | 7^{7} 6^{1} | 6^{8} 7^{10} | 6; 5 | | retired |
| 5 | (Brazil) (Colombia) | Thomaz Bellucci; Juan Sebastián Cabal | 6; 4 | 7; 5 |

== Second round playoffs ==
=== Mexico vs. Uruguay ===
Mexico
2
Domo de la Feria de Leon, León, Mexico
19 – 21 September 2008
Carpet (indoor)

Uruguay
3

| | | | 1 | 2 | 3 | 4 | 5 |
|---|---|---|---|---|---|---|---|
| 1 | (Mexico) (Uruguay) | Daniel Garza; Pablo Cuevas | 6^{4} 7^{7} | 6; 4 | 7; 5 | 7^{10} 6^{8} |
| 2 | (Mexico) (Uruguay) | Bruno Rodríguez; Marcel Felder | 4; 6 | 6; 4 | 6; 3 | 6^{9} 7^{11} | 0; 6 |
| 3 | (Mexico) (Uruguay) | Miguel Gallardo Valles / Víctor Romero; Pablo Cuevas / Marcel Felder | 7^{7} 6^{2} | 5; 7 | 6; 2 | 7^{7} 6^{1} |
| 4 | (Mexico) (Uruguay) | Miguel Gallardo Valles; Pablo Cuevas | 1; 6 | 7^{7} 6^{4} | 3; 6 | 4; 6 |
| 5 | (Mexico) (Uruguay) | Daniel Garza; Marcel Felder | 6; 3 | 0; 6 | 1; 6 | 6; 4 | 3; 6 |
