= 2012 Davis Cup Americas Zone Group I =

International tennis competition

The Americas Zone is one of the three zones of regional Davis Cup competition in 2012.

In the Americas Zone there are three different groups in which teams compete against each other to advance to the next group.

== Participating nations ==
Seeds:

1. Chile
2. Brazil

Remaining nations:

- Ecuador
- Colombia
- Uruguay
- Peru

== Draw ==
Second Round Play-offs
Lima, Peru (clay)
Peru	1
Ecuador	4

First Round Play-offs
bye
Peru
Ecuador
bye

First Round
1	Chile
bye
Montevideo, Uruguay (clay)
Peru	1
Uruguay	3
Salinas, Ecuador (clay)
Ecuador	1
Colombia	4
bye
2	Brazil

Second Round
Montevideo, Uruguay (clay)
1	Chile	3
Uruguay	1
São José do Rio Preto, Brazil (clay)
Colombia	1
2	Brazil	4

- Peru relegated to Group II in 2013.
- Chile and Brazil advance to World Group Play-off.

== First round ==
=== Peru vs. Uruguay ===
Peru
1
Carrasco Lawn Tennis Club, Montevideo, Uruguay
10–12 February 2012
clay

Uruguay
3

			1	2	3	4	5
1	(Peru) (Uruguay)	Duilio Beretta; Martín Cuevas	6^{3} 7^{7}	3; 6	1; 6
2	(Peru) (Uruguay)	Mauricio Echazú; Marcel Felder	3; 6	2; 6	4; 6
3	(Peru) (Uruguay)	Duilio Beretta / Sergio Galdós; Martín Cuevas / Marcel Felder	6; 1	6; 3	3; 6	6; 3
4	(Peru) (Uruguay)	Duilio Beretta; Marcel Felder	6; 2	2; 6	3; 6	1; 6
5	(Peru) (Uruguay)	Mauricio Echazú; Martín Cuevas						not played

=== Ecuador vs. Colombia ===
Ecuador
1
Salinas Yacht Club, Salinas, Ecuador
10–12 February 2012
clay

Colombia
4

			1	2	3	4	5
1	(Ecuador) (Colombia)	Júlio César Campozano; Robert Farah	7^{7} 6^{4}	6; 4	6; 2
2	(Ecuador) (Colombia)	Iván Endara; Santiago Giraldo	2; 6	6; 4	0; 6	1; 6
3	(Ecuador) (Colombia)	Júlio César Campozano / Diego Hidalgo; Juan Sebastián Cabal / Robert Farah	4; 6	2; 6	2; 6
4	(Ecuador) (Colombia)	Júlio César Campozano; Santiago Giraldo	3; 6	4; 6	3; 6
5	(Ecuador) (Colombia)	Diego Hidalgo; Juan Sebastián Cabal	2; 6	5; 7

== Second round ==
=== Uruguay vs. Chile ===
Uruguay
1
Carrasco Lawn Tennis Club, Montevideo, Uruguay
6–8 April 2012
clay (outdoor)

Chile
3

			1	2	3	4	5
1	(Uruguay) (Chile)	Marcel Felder; Jorge Aguilar	6; 4	6^{4} 7^{7}	6; 1	6; 2
2	(Uruguay) (Chile)	Martín Cuevas; Paul Capdeville	1; 6	3; 6	0; 6
3	(Uruguay) (Chile)	Ariel Behar / Marcel Felder; Jorge Aguilar / Paul Capdeville	0; 6	4; 6	2; 6
4	(Uruguay) (Chile)	Marcel Felder; Paul Capdeville	2; 6	6; 4	6; 2	2; 6	3; 6
5	(Uruguay) (Chile)	Martín Cuevas; Jorge Aguilar						not played

=== Colombia vs. Brazil ===
Brazil
4
Harmonia Tenis Clube, São José do Rio Preto, Brazil
6–8 April 2012
clay (outdoor)

Colombia
1

			1	2	3	4	5
1	(Brazil) (Colombia)	João Souza; Santiago Giraldo	3; 6	3; 6	4; 6
2	(Brazil) (Colombia)	Thomaz Bellucci; Alejandro Falla	2; 6	3; 6	6; 1	6; 4	6; 3
3	(Brazil) (Colombia)	Marcelo Melo / Bruno Soares; Juan Sebastián Cabal / Robert Farah	6; 3	6; 4	6; 2
4	(Brazil) (Colombia)	Thomaz Bellucci; Santiago Giraldo	6; 2	7^{7} 6^{3}	6; 2
5	(Brazil) (Colombia)	João Souza; Robert Farah	4; 6	6; 3	6; 4

== Second round play-offs ==
=== Peru vs. Ecuador ===
Peru
1
Club Lawn Tennis de la Exposicion, Lima, Peru
14–16 September 2012
clay (outdoor)

Ecuador
4

			1	2	3	4	5
1	(Peru) (Ecuador)	Duilio Beretta; Emilio Gómez	7; 5	2; 6	3; 6	4; 6
2	(Peru) (Ecuador)	Mauricio Echazú; Júlio César Campozano	6^{6} 7^{8}	3; 6	4; 6
3	(Peru) (Ecuador)	Duilio Beretta / Sergio Galdós; Júlio César Campozano / Roberto Quiroz	6; 3	6; 2	6; 4
4	(Peru) (Ecuador)	Duilio Beretta; Júlio César Campozano	6^{0} 7^{7}	6; 4	7; 5	1; 6	0; 6
5	(Peru) (Ecuador)	Jorge Brian Panta Herreros; Roberto Quiroz	6^{8} 7^{10}	1; 6
