= Alejandro González (tennis) =

Colombian tennis player (born 1989)

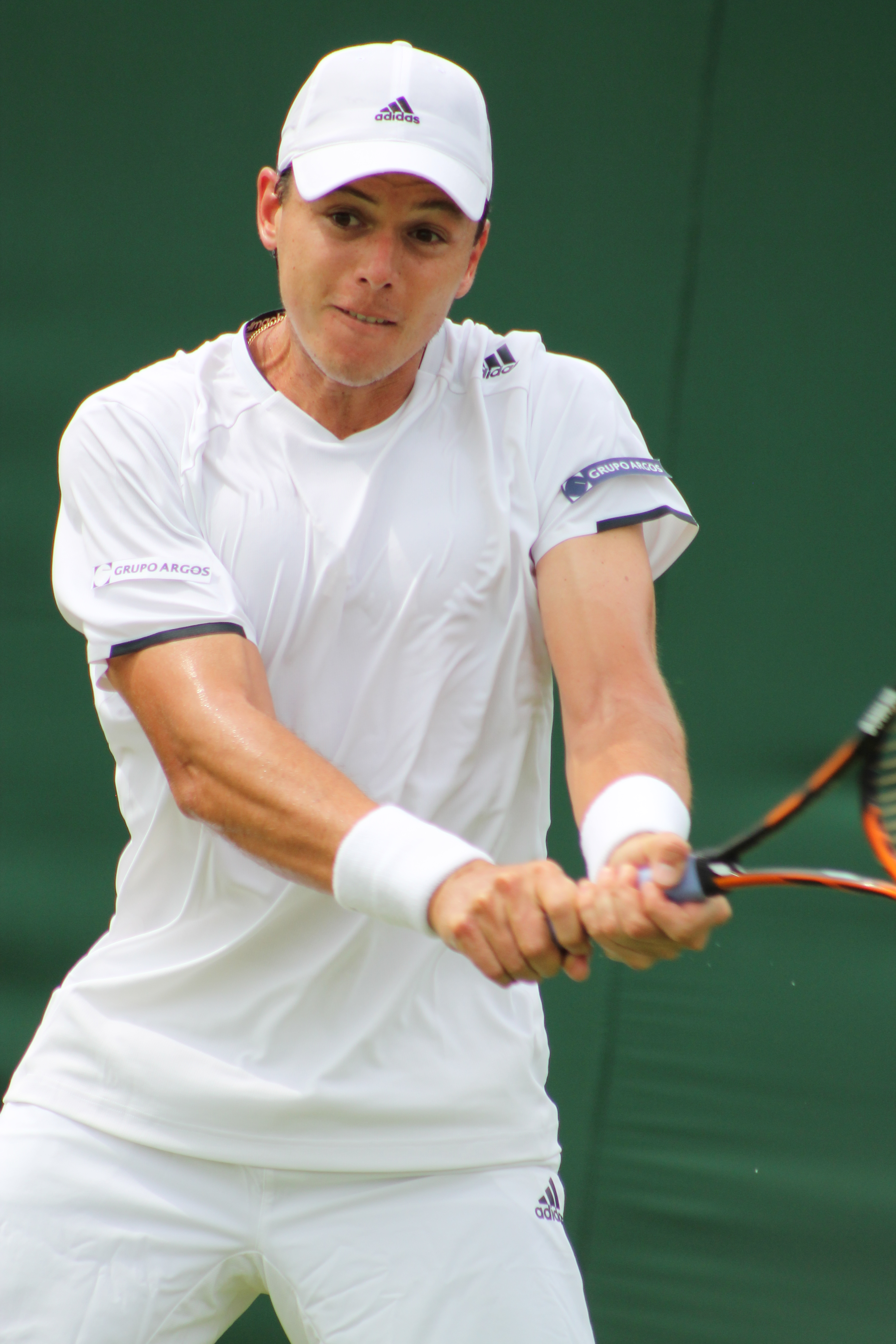
- Alejandro González at the 2014 Wimbledon Championships
- Country (sports): Colombia
- Born: 7 February 1989 (age 37) Medellín, Colombia
- Height: 1.91 m (6 ft 3 in)
- Turned pro: 2006
- Retired: 2022
- Plays: Right-handed (two-handed backhand)
- Prize money: $1,156,362

Singles
- Career record: 19–42
- Career titles: 0
- Highest ranking: No. 70 (9 June 2014)

Grand Slam singles results
- Australian Open: 2R (2015)
- French Open: 2R (2014)
- Wimbledon: 1R (2014)
- US Open: 2R (2014)

Doubles
- Career record: 5–15
- Career titles: 0
- Highest ranking: No. 177 (2 August 2010)

Grand Slam doubles results
- Australian Open: 1R (2014)
- French Open: 1R (2014)
- Wimbledon: 1R (2014)
- Last updated on: 27 April 2022.

Alejandro González (Latin American Spanish: [aleˈxandɾo ɣonˈsales]; (Note: In isolation, González is pronounced [ɡonˈsales].) born 7 February 1989) is a Colombian former professional tennis player. He has a career-high singles ranking of World No. 70 achieved on 9 June 2014.

== Career ==
Alejandro Gonzalez won his first singles title on the ATP Challenger Tour at the Ecuador tournament Challenger ATP de Salinas Diario Expreso in March 2013, defeating Argentine Renzo Olivo in three sets in the final. Previously, he had already won seven singles and six doubles tournaments on the circuit Future ITF and three doubles tournaments ATP Challenger Series. He followed this up with two more Challenger titles the same year, the Seguros Bolívar Open Medellín defeating Argentinian Guido Andreozzi in two sets, and the first edition of the São Paulo Challenger de Tênis, defeating another Argentinian Eduardo Schwank taking his tally to three Challenger wins in 2013.

In 2025, as captain of Colombia's national women's team in the Billie Jean King Cup, he did not record any victories with the team in either the series played in Australia or the series played in Croatia, marking the worst historical performance by a Colombian captain in charge of the national women's tennis team.

== ATP Tour ==
In July 2013 Gonzalez received a direct entry to his first ATP World Tour event, the 2013 Claro Open Colombia, however he lost in the first round to Frenchman Adrian Mannarino in three sets.

Gonzalez made his Grand Slam tournament debut at the beginning of 2014 at the Australian Open, receiving direct entry for the first time. He was drawn against third seed David Ferrer, however lost in straight sets to the Spaniard.

He also entered the doubles draw, teaming up with Argentine Carlos Berlocq. The pair were drawn against local wildcard pairing of Benjamin Mitchell and Jordan Thompson, however they lost in three sets despite taking the opening set. Gonzalez received a direct entry to two consecutive ATP Tour events in South America, losing in the first round of the Royal Guard Open to Italian Paolo Lorenzi, followed by another opening round loss, at the Copa Claro in Buenos Aires, this time to Frenchman Jérémy Chardy. He followed this with an appearance at the inaugural Rio Open in Brazil, losing once again in the first round to Pablo Cuevas of Uruguay. The following week, he recorded four losses in a row, losing to Potito Starace of Italy at the Brasil Open.

At the 2014 BNP Paribas Open in Indian Wells, California, Gonzalez received his first ever entry to a Masters 1000 tournament. Here he recorded his first ever ATP tour-level wins of his career, defeating Adrian Mannarino in the first round, and backing that up with a win over 31st seed Ivan Dodig of Croatia. His third round opponent was world number 2 and eventual champion Novak Djokovic was a significant step up from his previous opponents. He took a set off the former world number one before succumbing 1–6 6–3 1–6.

== Challenger and Futures finals ==
=== Singles: 26 (11–15) ===
Legend (singles) ATP Challenger Tour Finals (0–1) ATP Challenger Tour (4–5) ITF Futures (7–9)	Titles by surface Hard (3–4) Clay (8–11) Grass (0–0) Carpet (0–0)

Result	W–L	Date	Tournament	Tier	Surface	Opponent	Score
Loss	0–1	Sep 2007	Brazil F15, Recife	Futures	Clay	(Brazil) Daniel Dutra da Silva	6–7^{(1–7)}, 5–7
Loss	0–2	Feb 2009	Colombia F1, Manizales	Futures	Clay	(Chile) Guillermo Hormazábal	7–6^{(7–2)}, 1–6, 4–6
Win	1–2	May 2009	Venezuela F1, Maracay	Futures	Hard	(Venezuela) Jhonnatan Medina-Álvarez	6–7^{(5–7)}, 6–3, 6–1
Win	2–2	May 2009	Venezuela F2, Mérida	Futures	Hard	(Venezuela) Yohny Romero	6–2, 4–6, 6–1
Loss	2–3	May 2009	Venezuela F3, Maracaibo	Futures	Hard	(Venezuela) José de Armas	5–7, 3–6
Win	3–3	Aug 2009	Colombia F3, Barranquilla	Futures	Clay	(Colombia) Juan Sebastián Cabal	6–2, 6–4
Loss	3–4	Aug 2009	Colombia F4, Bogotá	Futures	Clay	(Uruguay) Marcel Felder	4–6, 6–4, 3–6
Win	4–4	Aug 2009	Colombia F5, Medellín	Futures	Clay	(Colombia) Juan Sebastián Cabal	6–3, 3–6, 6–1
Loss	4–5	Jun 2010	Italy F14, Aosta	Futures	Clay	(Italy) Matteo Marrai	2–6, 3–6
Win	5–5	Oct 2010	Venezuela F5, Caracas	Futures	Hard	(United States) Greg Ouellette	6–1, 7–6^{(7–3)}
Loss	5–6	Mar 2011	Turkey F9, Antalya	Futures	Clay	(Austria) Daniel Köllerer	1–6, 0–6
Loss	5–7	Mar 2011	Turkey F11, Antalya	Futures	Hard	(Moldova) Radu Albot	5–7, 3–6
Loss	5–8	Aug 2011	Colombia F4, Medellín	Futures	Clay	(Colombia) Eduardo Struvay	4–6, 2–6
Win	6–8	Aug 2011	Colombia F5, Bogotá	Futures	Clay	(Colombia) Carlos Salamanca	5–7, 6–4, 6–2
Win	7–8	Sep 2012	Colombia F3, Cúcuta	Futures	Clay	(Colombia) Michael Quintero	7–5, 6–2
Loss	7–9	Oct 2012	Colombia F4, Villavicencio	Futures	Clay	(Argentina) Patricio Heras	7–6^{(9–7)}, 6–4
Win	8–9	Feb 2013	Salinas, Ecuador	Challenger	Clay	(Argentina) Renzo Olivo	4–6, 6–3, 7–6 ^{(9–7)}
Loss	8–10	Apr 2013	Panama City, Panama	Challenger	Clay	(Spain) Rubén Ramírez Hidalgo	6–4, 5–7, 7–6 ^{(7–4)}
Win	9–10	Jul 2013	Medellín, Colombia	Challenger	Clay	(Argentina) Guido Andreozzi	6–4, 6–4
Win	10–10	Aug 2013	São Paulo, Brazil	Challenger	Clay	(Argentina) Eduardo Schwank	6–2, 6–3
Loss	10–11	Oct 2013	São José do Rio Preto, Brazil	Challenger	Clay	(Brazil) João Souza	7–6^{(7–0)}, 6–3
Loss	10–12	Nov 2013	São Paulo, Brazil	Challenger Finals	Clay	(Italy) Filippo Volandri	4–6, 6–4, 6–2
Loss	10–13	Jan 2014	São Paulo, Brazil	Challenger	Hard	(Brazil) João Souza	6–4, 6–4
Win	11–13	Oct 2014	Córdoba, Argentina	Challenger	Clay	(Argentina) Máximo González	7–5, 1–6, 6–3
Loss	11–14	Oct 2015	Pereira, Colombia	Challenger	Clay	(Italy) Paolo Lorenzi	6–4, 3–6, 4–6
Loss	11–15	Feb 2016	Morelos, Mexico	Challenger	Hard	(Austria) Gerald Melzer	6–7^{(4–7)}, 3–6

=== Doubles: 26 (11–15) ===
Legend (singles) ATP Challenger Tour (5–6) ITF Futures (6–9)	Titles by surface Hard (6–5) Clay (5–10) Grass (0–0) Carpet (0–0)

Outcome	No.	Date	Tournament	Surface	Partner	Opponent	Score
Loss	1.	19 August 2007	F1 Futures Valencia, Venezuela	Hard	(Chile) Borja Malo-Casado	(Mexico) Daniel Garza (Mexico) Santiago González	3–6, 6–7^{(3–7)}
Win	2.	28 October 2007	F1 Futures Managua, Nicaragua	Hard	(Argentina) Nicolás Todero	(Dominican Republic) Víctor Estrella (Bolivia) José-Roberto Velasco	7–5, 6–4
Loss	3.	11 May 2018	F4 Futures Barranquilla, Colombia	Clay	(Colombia) Eduardo Struvay	(Ecuador) Julio César Campozano (Argentina) Alejandro Kon	6–2, 6–7^{(1–7), [9–11]}
Win	1.	19 July 2008	Manta, Ecuador	Hard	(Colombia) Eduardo Struvay	(Dominican Republic) Víctor Estrella (Argentina) Alejandro Fabbri	7–5, 3–6, [10–7]
Loss	4.	27 July 2008	F4 Futures Maracaibo, Venezuela	Hard	(Colombia) Eduardo Struvay	(Venezuela) Piero Luisi (Venezuela) Roberto Maytín	7–6^{(7–4)}, 6–7^{(5–7)}, [12–14]
Win	5.	3 August 2008	F5 Futures Valencia, Venezuela	Hard	(Colombia) Eduardo Struvay	(Venezuela) Piero Luisi (Venezuela) Roberto Maytín	w/o
Win	6.	12 October 2008	F8 Futures Valencia, Venezuela	Hard	(Colombia) Pablo González	(Venezuela) Piero Luisi (Venezuela) Roberto Maytín	6–3, 6–4
Win	7.	8 February 2009	F1 Futures Manizales, Colombia	Clay	(Colombia) Eduardo Struvay	(Argentina) Juan Pablo Amado (Dominican Republic) Víctor Estrella	6–2, 6–7^{(6–8)}, [10–5]
Win	8.	23 May 2009	F2 Futures Mérida, Venezuela	Hard	(Colombia) Eduardo Struvay	(Peru) Mauricio Echazú (Ecuador) Iván Endara	6–2, 7–5
Loss	9.	14 June 2009	F12 Futures Loomis, United States	Hard	(Colombia) Eduardo Struvay	(United States) Austin Krajicek (United States) Conor Pollock	2–6, 6–7^{(1–7)}
Loss	10.	22 August 2009	F4 Futures Bogota, Colombia	Clay	(Colombia) Felipe Mantilla	(Colombia) Juan Sebastián Cabal (Ecuador) Julio César Campozano	2–6, 0–6
Win	11.	30 August 2009	F5 Futures Medellin, Colombia	Clay	(Colombia) Juan Sebastián Cabal	(Mexico) Daniel Garza (Colombia) Michael Quintero	6–1, 6–4
Win	2.	27 September 2009	Bogotá, Colombia	Clay	(Colombia) Alejandro Falla	(Argentina) Diego Álvarez (Argentina) Sebastián Decoud	5–7, 6–4 ^{(10–8)}
Loss	3.	12 July 2010	Bogotá, Colombia	Clay	(Dominican Republic) Víctor Estrella	(Colombia) Juan Sebastián Cabal (Colombia) Robert Farah	7–6^{(7–6)}, 6–4
Loss	4.	4 October 2010	Quito, Ecuador	Clay	(Colombia) Carlos Salamanca	(Mexico) Daniel Garza (United States) Eric Nunez	7–5, 6–4
Loss	12.	31 January 2011	F1 Futures Cúcuta, Colombia	Clay	(Colombia) Eduardo Struvay	(Argentina) Martín Alund (Argentina) Diego Álvarez	6–4, 6–4
Loss	13.	9 May 2011	F9 Futures Pozzuoli, Italy	Clay	(Colombia) Eduardo Struvay	(Italy) Erik Crepaldi (Italy) Claudio Grassi	6–7^{(12–14)},6–1, [10–6]
Loss	14.	8 August 2011	F5 Futures Guayaquil, Ecuador	Hard	(Colombia) Felipe Mantilla	(Argentina) Guido Andreozzi (Uruguay) Ariel Behar	7–6^{(17–9)},4–6, [10–8]
Win	5.	8 July 2012	Panama City, Panama	Clay	(Ecuador) Júlio César Campozano	(United States) Daniel Kosakowski (Canada) Peter Polansky	6–4, 7–5
Loss	15.	30 July 2012	F20 Futures La Spezia, Italy	Clay	(Portugal) Pedro Sousa	(Colombia) Cristian Rodriguez (Colombia) Óscar Rodríguez	7–6^{(7–1)},6–4
Loss	6.	15 April 2013	Panama City, Panama	Clay	(Ecuador) Júlio César Campozano	(Chile) Jorge Aguilar (Peru) Sergio Galdós	6–4, 6–4
Loss	7.	1 July 2013	Manta, Ecuador	Clay	(Colombia) Carlos Salamanca	(El Salvador) Marcelo Arévalo (Peru) Sergio Galdós	6–3, 6–4
Win	8.	10 November 2013	Bogotá, Colombia	Clay	(Colombia) Juan Sebastián Cabal	(Colombia) Nicolás Barrientos (Colombia) Eduardo Struvay	6–3, 6–2
Loss	9.	4 October 2014	Cali, Colombia	Clay (red)	(Mexico) César Ramírez	(Argentina) Guido Andreozzi (Argentina) Guillermo Durán	6–3, 6–4
Win	10.	7 August 2016	Granby, Canada	Hard	(Brazil) Guilherme Clezar	(India) Saketh Myneni (India) Sanam Singh	3–6, 6–1, [12–10]
Loss	11.	6 January 2018	Nouméa, New Caledonia	Hard	(Spain) Jaume Munar	(France) Hugo Nys (Germany) Tim Pütz	2–6, 2–6

== Performance timelines ==
Key
W	F	SF	QF	#R	RR	Q#	P#	DNQ	A	Z#	PO	G	S	B	NMS	NTI	P	NH

(W) winner; (F) finalist; (SF) semifinalist; (QF) quarterfinalist; (#R) rounds 4, 3, 2, 1; (RR) round-robin stage; (Q#) qualification round; (P#) preliminary round; (DNQ) did not qualify; (A) absent; (Z#) Davis/Fed Cup Zonal Group (with number indication) or (PO) play-off; (G) gold, (S) silver or (B) bronze Olympic/Paralympic medal; (NMS) not a Masters tournament; (NTI) not a Tier I tournament; (P) postponed; (NH) not held; (SR) strike rate (events won / competed); (W–L) win–loss record.
To avoid confusion and double counting, these charts are updated at the conclusion of a tournament or when the player's participation has ended.

=== Singles ===
Current till 2015 US Open.

Tournament	2012	2013	2014	2015	2016	2017	2018	2019	2020	2021	2022	SR	W-L
Grand Slam tournaments
Australian Open	Q1	A	1R	2R	Q3	A	Q3	A	A	A	A	0 / 4	3–3
French Open	A	Q1	2R	Q1	Q2	Q2	A	A	A	A		0 / 1	1–1
Wimbledon	A	Q1	1R	Q1	A	Q2	A	A	NH	A		0 / 1	0–1
US Open	Q2	Q2	2R	1R	Q3	Q3	A	A	A	A		0 / 2	1–2
Win–loss	0–0	0–0	2–4	1–2	0–0	0–0	0–0	0–0	0–0	0–0		0 / 6	3–6
National representation
Davis Cup	A	A	PO	Z1	Z1	PO	Z1	GS	A	A		0 / 1	7–7
Win–loss	0–0	0–0	1–1	2–0	1–2	0–2	2–0	1–1	0–0	0–0	0–1	0 / 1	7–7
ATP World Tour Masters 1000
Indian Wells	A	A	3R	A	Q1	A	A	A	NH	A		0 / 1	2–1
Miami	A	A	2R	Q2	1R	A	A	A	NH	A		0 / 2	1–2
Madrid	A	Q1	Q2	1R	A	A	A	A	NH	A		0 / 1	0–1
Rome	A	A	1R	Q1	A	A	A	A	A	A		0 / 1	0–1
Canada	A	A	A	Q2	1R	A	A	A	NH	A		0 / 1	0–1
Cincinnati	A	A	Q2	A	A	A	A	A	A	A		0 / 0	0–0
Win–loss	0–0	0–0	3–3	0–1	0–2	0–0	0–0	0–0	0–0	0–0	0–0	0 / 6	3–6
Career statistics
Year-end ranking	243	91	92	141	219	373	312	468	448	433			

=== Doubles ===
This table is current through the 2014 Australian Open.

Tournament	2012	2013	2014	2015	SR	W-L
Grand Slam tournaments
Australian Open	A	A	1R	A	0 / 1	0–1
French Open	A	A	1R	A	0 / 1	0–1
Wimbledon	A	A	1R	A	0 / 1	0–1
US Open	A	A	A	A	0 / 0	0–0
Win–loss	0–0	0–0	0–3	0–0	0 / 3	0–3
Career statistics
Year-end ranking	379	204	414	383	177	
