= 2007 Davis Cup Americas Zone Group I =

International tennis competition

The Americas Zone is one of the three zones of regional Davis Cup competition in 2007.

In the Americas Zone there are three different groups in which teams compete against each other to advance to the next group.

== Participating nations ==
- Brazil
- Canada
- Colombia
- Mexico
- Peru
- Venezuela

== Draw ==
Second Round Play-offs
Valencia, Venezuela (hard)
Venezuela	1
Colombia	4

First Round Play-offs
Metepec, Mexico (hard)
S	Mexico	5
Venezuela	0
Colombia
bye

First Round
S	Mexico
bye
Asia, Peru (clay)
Venezuela	2
Peru	3
Calgary, Canada (indoor carpet)
Colombia	0
Canada	5
bye
S	Brazil

Second Round
Asia, Peru (clay)
S	Mexico	2
Peru	3
Florianópolis, Brazil (clay)
Canada	1
S	Brazil	3

- Venezuela relegated to Group II in 2008.
- Peru and Brazil advance to World Group Play-off.

== First round ==
=== Peru vs. Venezuela ===
Peru
3
Estadio Asia, Asia, Peru
9 – 11 February 2007
Clay

Venezuela
2

			1	2	3	4	5
1	(Peru) (Venezuela)	Luis Horna; Jhonnatan Medina-Álvarez	6; 3	6; 4	2; 6	6; 4
2	(Peru) (Venezuela)	Iván Miranda; Yohny Romero	6; 1	6; 2	6; 1
3	(Peru) (Venezuela)	Iván Miranda / Matías Silva; David Navarrete / Yohny Romero	6; 3	6; 3	1; 6	6^{1} 7^{7}	6; 4
4	(Peru) (Venezuela)	Mauricio Echazú; Román Recarte	6; 4	5; 7	2; 6
5	(Peru) (Venezuela)	Matías Silva; Jhonnatan Medina-Álvarez	3; 6	3; 6

=== Canada vs. Colombia ===
Canada
5
The Corral, Stampede Park, Calgary, Canada
9 – 11 February 2007
Carpet (indoor)

Colombia
0

			1	2	3	4	5
1	(Canada) (Colombia)	Frank Dancevic; Santiago Giraldo	6; 2	6; 4	6; 3
2	(Canada) (Colombia)	Frédéric Niemeyer; Alejandro Falla	6; 0	7^{7} 6^{5}	6; 3
3	(Canada) (Colombia)	Daniel Nestor / Frédéric Niemeyer; Alejandro Falla / Carlos Salamanca	7^{7} 6^{2}	6; 2	6; 3
4	(Canada) (Colombia)	Frank Dancevic; Pablo González	6; 1	7; 5
5	(Canada) (Colombia)	Peter Polansky; Carlos Salamanca	7^{7} 6^{4}	6; 4

== Second round ==
=== Peru vs. Mexico ===
Peru
3
Estadio Asia, Asia, Peru
6 – 8 April 2007
Clay

Mexico
2

			1	2	3	4	5
1	(Peru) (Mexico)	Luis Horna; Daniel Garza	6; 4	7^{10} 6^{8}	2; 6	6; 3
2	(Peru) (Mexico)	Iván Miranda; Santiago González	6; 4	3; 6	6; 1	5; 7	8; 6
3	(Peru) (Mexico)	Luis Horna / Iván Miranda; Santiago González / Antonio Ruiz-Rosales	6; 1	6; 3	6; 1
4	(Peru) (Mexico)	Matías Silva; Juan Manuel Elizondo	4; 6	3; 6
5	(Peru) (Mexico)	Mauricio Echazú; Daniel Garza	6; 4	1; 6	4; 6

=== Brazil vs. Canada ===
Brazil
3
Costao do Santinho Resort e Spa, Florianópolis, Brazil
6 – 8 April 2007
Clay

Canada
1

			1	2	3	4	5
1	(Brazil) (Canada)	Ricardo Mello; Frank Dancevic	3; 6	6^{7} 7^{9}	6; 3	6; 3	11; 9
2	(Brazil) (Canada)	Flávio Saretta; Frédéric Niemeyer	6; 4	6^{6} 7^{8}	6; 2	6; 1
3	(Brazil) (Canada)	Gustavo Kuerten / André Sá; Daniel Nestor / Frédéric Niemeyer	6; 4	3; 6	4; 6	6^{4} 7^{7}
4	(Brazil) (Canada)	Flávio Saretta; Peter Polansky	1; 6	6; 2	7; 5	6; 1
5	(Brazil) (Canada)	Ricardo Mello; Frédéric Niemeyer						not played

== First round playoffs ==
=== Mexico vs. Venezuela ===
Mexico
5
Club de Golf San Carlos, Metepec, Mexico
20 – 22 July 2007
Hard

Venezuela
0

			1	2	3	4	5
1	(Mexico) (Venezuela)	Daniel Garza; Yohny Romero	6; 4	4; 6	6; 2	4; 6	6; 3
2	(Mexico) (Venezuela)	Santiago González; Jhonnatan Medina-Álvarez	6; 3	6; 2	6; 2
3	(Mexico) (Venezuela)	Daniel Garza / Santiago González; Roberto Maytín / Daniel Vallverdu	6; 4	7; 5	3; 6	4; 6	6; 2
4	(Mexico) (Venezuela)	Daniel Garza; Daniel Vallverdu	7^{7} 6^{5}	6; 1
5	(Mexico) (Venezuela)	Juan Manuel Elizondo; Roberto Maytín	6; 0	6; 1

== Second round playoffs ==
=== Venezuela vs. Colombia ===
Venezuela
1
Complejo de Tenis 'Rafael Yanez Gordils', Valencia, Venezuela
21 – 23 September 2007
Hard

Colombia
4

			1	2	3	4	5
1	(Venezuela) (Colombia)	Yohny Romero; Santiago Giraldo	3; 6	3; 6	4; 6
2	(Venezuela) (Colombia)	Jhonnatan Medina-Álvarez; Alejandro Falla	2; 6	4; 6	6^{4} 7^{7}
3	(Venezuela) (Colombia)	Yohny Romero / Daniel Vallverdu; Alejandro Falla / Carlos Salamanca	7^{7} 6^{5}	1; 6	6; 3	7^{9} 6^{7}
4	(Venezuela) (Colombia)	Yohny Romero; Alejandro Falla	0; 6	2; 6	2; 6
5	(Venezuela) (Colombia)	Jhonnatan Medina-Álvarez; Michael Quintero	3; 6	3; 6
