= Seanon Williams =

Barbadian tennis player

- Country (sports): Barbados
- Born: 10 February 1991 (age 34); Bridgetown, Barbados
- Plays: Right-handed

Singles
- Career record: 1–9 (at ATP Tour level, Grand Slam level, and in Davis Cup)
- Career titles: 0

Doubles
- Career record: 2–4 (at ATP Tour level, Grand Slam level, and in Davis Cup)
- Career titles: 0
- Last updated on: 20 February 2017.

Seanon Williams (born 10 February 1991) is a Barbadian tennis player.

Williams represents Barbados at the Davis Cup, where he has a W/L record of 3–13.
