= Haydn Lewis =

Barbadian tennis player

- Country (sports): Barbados
- Born: 2 January 1986 (age 40) Bridgetown, Barbados
- Plays: Left-handed (two-handed backhand)
- Prize money: US$31,061

Singles
- Career record: 3–14
- Career titles: 0
- Highest ranking: No. 583 (27 October 2008)

Doubles
- Career record: 9–8
- Career titles: 0
- Highest ranking: No. 405 (15 August 2011)
- Last updated on: 21 October 2019.

Haydn Lewis (born 2 January 1986) is a professional Barbadian tennis player.

Lewis reached his highest individual ranking on the ATP Tour on 27 October 2008, when he became World number 583. He primarily plays on the Futures circuit and the Challenger circuit.

Lewis is a member of the Barbadian Davis Cup team, having posted a 24–7 record in singles and a 15–9 record in doubles in thirty-six ties played.

== ATP Challenger Tour and ITF Futures finals ==
=== Singles: 3 (3 runners-up) ===
Legend
ATP Challenger Tour (0–0)
ITF Futures (0–3)

Outcome	No.	Date	Tournament	Surface	Opponent in the final	Score
Runner-up	1.	29 October 2007	Happy Valley, Australia	Hard	(Australia) Andrew Coelho	4–6, 1–6
Runner-up	2.	17 March 2008	Sorrento, Australia	Hard	(Australia) Colin Ebelthite	6–3, 3–6, 2–6
Runner-up	3.	11 May 2009	(United States) Tampa, U.S.	Clay	(Canada) Philip Bester	2–6, 6–7^{(7–9)}
