= Barbados Davis Cup team =

National sports team

Barbados
- Captain: Damien Applewhaite
- Nations Ranking: 53 ▲1 (20 September 2021)
- Colors: Blue and yellow
- First year: 1990
- Years played: 28
- Ties played (W–L): 113 (49–64)
- Most total wins: Haydn Lewis (46–29)
- Most singles wins: Darian King (29–7)
- Most doubles wins: Haydn Lewis (20–13)
- Best doubles team: Darian King & Haydn Lewis (10–6)
- Most ties played: Haydn Lewis (47)
- Most years played: Haydn Lewis (14)

The Barbados national tennis team represents Barbados in Davis Cup tennis competition and are governed by the Barbados Tennis Association.

== History ==
Barbados competed in its first Davis Cup in 1990. Barbadian players previously competed on the Caribbean/West Indies team.

In 1990, Barbados debuted in Group II of the Americas Zone (the lowest tier at that time). In 2014, they upset Mexico to advance to Group I of the Americas Zone for the first time in their history. They were relegated in 2016, but managed promotion back into Group I in 2017.

== Current team (2022) ==
- Darian King
- Matthew Foster-Estwick
- Kaipo Marshall
- Haydn Lewis
- Xavier Lawrence

== See also ==
- Davis Cup
- Barbados Billie Jean King Cup team
