= 1995 Davis Cup Americas Zone Group I =

Tennis tournament group

The Americas Zone was one of the three zones of the regional Davis Cup competition in 1995.

In the Americas Zone there were three different tiers, called groups, in which teams competed against each other to advance to the upper tier. Winners in Group I advanced to the World Group qualifying round, along with losing teams from the World Group first round. Teams who lost their respective ties competed in the relegation play-offs, with winning teams remaining in Group I, whereas teams who lost their play-offs were relegated to the Americas Zone Group II in 1996.

== Participating nations ==
- Argentina
- Bahamas
- Brazil
- Chile
- Mexico
- Peru
- Venezuela
- Uruguay

=== Draw ===
Second Round Play-offs
Lima, Peru (hard)
Uruguay	1
Peru	4

First Round Play-offs
Santiago, Chile (clay)
Uruguay	0
Chile	5
Lima, Peru (clay)
Bahamas	3
Peru	2

First Round
Caracas, Venezuela (hard)
Uruguay	0
Venezuela	5
Buenos Aires, Argentina (clay)
Argentina	3
Chile	2
Rio de Janeiro, Brazil (clay)
Bahamas	0
Brazil	5
Mexico City, Mexico (hard)
Mexico	3
Peru	1

Second Round
Caracas, Venezuela (hard)
Venezuela	3
Argentina	2
Mexico City, Mexico (hard)
Brazil	1
Mexico	4

- Uruguay relegated to Group II in 1996.
- Venezuela and Mexico advance to World Group qualifying round.

== First round ==
=== Venezuela vs. Uruguay ===
Venezuela
5
Altamira Tennis Club, Caracas, Venezuela
3–5 February 1995
Hard

Uruguay
0

			1	2	3	4	5
1	(Venezuela) (Uruguay)	Maurice Ruah; Marcelo Filippini	6; 4	6^{6} 7^{8}	6^{4} 7^{7}	6; 2	7; 5
2	(Venezuela) (Uruguay)	Nicolás Pereira; Diego Pérez	6; 3	3; 6	4; 6	7; 5	6; 3
3	(Venezuela) (Uruguay)	Nicolás Pereira / Maurice Ruah; Marcelo Filippini / Diego Pérez	3; 6	6; 3	6; 3	7; 5
4	(Venezuela) (Uruguay)	Nicolás Pereira; Marcelo Filippini	6; 3	7^{8} 6^{6}
5	(Venezuela) (Uruguay)	Jimy Szymanski; Federico Dondo	6; 0	6; 1

=== Argentina vs. Chile ===
Argentina
3
Buenos Aires Lawn Tennis Club, Buenos Aires, Argentina
3–5 February 1995
Clay

Chile
2

			1	2	3	4	5
1	(Argentina) (Chile)	Franco Davín; Gabriel Silberstein	2; 6	2; 6	5; 7
2	(Argentina) (Chile)	Javier Frana; Marcelo Ríos	3; 6	6; 2	6; 2	4; 6	7; 5
3	(Argentina) (Chile)	Javier Frana / Luis Lobo; Marcelo Rebolledo / Gabriel Silberstein	6; 4	6; 4	6; 2
4	(Argentina) (Chile)	Franco Davín; Marcelo Ríos	5; 7	3; 6	2; 6
5	(Argentina) (Chile)	Javier Frana; Gabriel Silberstein	5; 7	3; 6	6; 4	6; 2	6; 4

=== Brazil vs. Bahamas ===
Brazil
5
Barra Centre, Rio de Janeiro, Brazil
3–5 February 1995
Clay

Bahamas
0

			1	2	3	4	5
1	(Brazil) (The Bahamas)	Luiz Mattar; Mark Knowles	7^{7} 6^{5}	6; 3	6; 2
2	(Brazil) (The Bahamas)	Fernando Meligeni; Roger Smith	6; 0	7; 5	4; 6	6; 0
3	(Brazil) (The Bahamas)	Jaime Oncins / Fernando Roese; Mark Knowles / Roger Smith	6; 4	6; 3	6; 2
4	(Brazil) (The Bahamas)	Luiz Mattar; Roger Smith	6; 3	6; 2
5	(Brazil) (The Bahamas)	Fernando Meligeni; Mark Knowles	6; 2	3; 6	6; 2

=== Mexico vs. Peru ===
Mexico
3
Club Alemán de México, Mexico City, Mexico
3–5 February 1995
Hard

Peru
1

			1	2	3	4	5
1	(Mexico) (Peru)	Leonardo Lavalle; Alejandro Aramburú	6; 4	6; 1	6; 2
2	(Mexico) (Peru)	Luis Herrera; Jaime Yzaga	4; 6	5; 7	6; 1	4; 6
3	(Mexico) (Peru)	Leonardo Lavalle / Jorge Lozano; Américo Venero / Jaime Yzaga	6; 4	6; 3	5; 7	7^{7} 6^{4}
4	(Mexico) (Peru)	Leonardo Lavalle; Jaime Yzaga	2; 6	6; 3	6; 1	6; 3
5	(Mexico) (Peru)	Luis Herrera; Alejandro Aramburú						not played

== Second round ==
=== Venezuela vs. Argentina ===
Venezuela
3
Altamira Tennis Club, Caracas, Venezuela
31 March–2 April 1995
Hard

Argentina
2

			1	2	3	4	5
1	(Venezuela) (Argentina)	Maurice Ruah; Javier Frana	3; 6	6^{4} 7^{7}	6; 3	2; 6
2	(Venezuela) (Argentina)	Nicolás Pereira; Federico Browne	6; 3	6; 1	7; 5
3	(Venezuela) (Argentina)	Nicolás Pereira / Maurice Ruah; Javier Frana / Luis Lobo	4; 6	6; 4	6; 2	7^{11} 6^{9}
4	(Venezuela) (Argentina)	Nicolás Pereira; Javier Frana	4; 6	5; 7	6; 1	6; 4	4; 6
5	(Venezuela) (Argentina)	Maurice Ruah; Patricio Arnold	3; 6	6; 1	6; 2	6; 4

=== Mexico vs. Brazil ===
Mexico
4
Club Alemán de México, Mexico City, Mexico
31 March–2 April 1995
Hard

Brazil
1

			1	2	3	4	5
1	(Mexico) (Brazil)	Luis Herrera; Luiz Mattar	7^{7} 6^{5}	6; 3	6; 1
2	(Mexico) (Brazil)	Leonardo Lavalle; Jaime Oncins	6; 4	7; 5	7; 5
3	(Mexico) (Brazil)	Leonardo Lavalle / Jorge Lozano; Luiz Mattar / Jaime Oncins	6; 0	6; 2	6; 4
4	(Mexico) (Brazil)	Óscar Ortiz; Fabio Silberberg	6; 2	3; 6	3; 6
5	(Mexico) (Brazil)	Luis Herrera; Jaime Oncins	4; 1					retired

== First round relegation play-offs ==
=== Chile vs. Uruguay ===
Chile
5
Estadio Nacional, Santiago, Chile
31 March–2 April 1995
Clay

Uruguay
0

			1	2	3	4	5
1	(Chile) (Uruguay)	Gabriel Silberstein; Victor Caldarelli	6; 3	6; 2	6; 2
2	(Chile) (Uruguay)	Marcelo Ríos; Diego Pérez	6; 0	6; 1	6; 1
3	(Chile) (Uruguay)	Sergio Cortés / Gabriel Silberstein; Marcelo Filippini / Diego Pérez	6^{8} 7^{10}	7; 5	7; 5	3; 6	6; 3
4	(Chile) (Uruguay)	Marcelo Ríos; Victor Caldarelli	7^{7} 6^{5}	6; 3
5	(Chile) (Uruguay)	Gabriel Silberstein; Diego Pérez	6; 2	6; 1

=== Peru vs. Bahamas ===
Peru
2
Club Terrazas, Lima, Peru
31 March–2 April 1995
Clay

Bahamas
3

			1	2	3	4	5
1	(Peru) (The Bahamas)	Jaime Yzaga; Mark Knowles	7; 5	6; 1	6; 3
2	(Peru) (The Bahamas)	Alejandro Aramburú; Roger Smith	7; 5	6; 3	6; 1
3	(Peru) (The Bahamas)	Luis Horna / Américo Venero; Mark Knowles / Roger Smith	1; 6	4; 6	6^{6} 7^{8}
4	(Peru) (The Bahamas)	Jaime Yzaga; Roger Smith	3; 6	4; 6	4; 6
5	(Peru) (The Bahamas)	Alejandro Aramburú; Mark Knowles	2; 6	0; 6	4; 6

== Second round relegation play-offs ==
=== Peru vs. Uruguay ===
Peru
4
Club Terrazas, Lima, Peru
22–24 September 1995
Hard

Uruguay
1

			1	2	3	4	5
1	(Peru) (Uruguay)	Américo Venero; Marcelo Filippini	1; 6	6^{6} 7^{8}	6; 4	3; 6
2	(Peru) (Uruguay)	Jaime Yzaga; Federico Dondo	6; 4	6; 4	6; 3
3	(Peru) (Uruguay)	José Luis Noriega / Jaime Yzaga; Marcelo Filippini / Diego Pérez	6; 3	7; 5	6; 3
4	(Peru) (Uruguay)	Jaime Yzaga; Marcelo Filippini	6; 4	2; 6	6; 3	7; 5
5	(Peru) (Uruguay)	Américo Venero; Federico Dondo	6; 1	6; 1
