= 1994 Davis Cup Americas Zone Group I =

International tennis competition

The Americas Zone was one of the three zones of the regional Davis Cup competition in 1994.

In the Americas Zone there were three different tiers, called groups, in which teams competed against each other to advance to the upper tier. Winners in Group I advanced to the World Group qualifying round, along with losing teams from the World Group first round. Winners of the preliminary rounds joined the remaining teams in the main draw first round, while losing teams competed in the relegation play-off, with the losing team relegated to the Americas Zone Group II in 1995.

== Participating nations ==
- Argentina
- Bahamas
- Brazil
- Chile
- Cuba
- Mexico
- Peru
- Uruguay

=== Draw ===
Relegation Play-off; 25–27 March
Mexico City, Mexico (clay)
Cuba	0
Mexico	5

Preliminary Round; 4–6 February
Montevideo, Uruguay (clay)
Uruguay	5
Cuba	0
Lima, Peru (clay)
Mexico	2
Peru	3

- Cuba relegated to Group II in 1995.

First Round; 25–27 March
Argentina
bye
Montevideo, Uruguay (clay)
Bahamas	2
Uruguay	3
Lima, Peru (hard)
Peru	3
Chile	2
bye
Brazil

Second Round; 8–17 July
Montevideo, Uruguay (clay)
Argentina	2
Uruguay	3
Lima, Peru (clay)
Peru	3
Brazil	2

- Uruguay and Peru advance to World Group qualifying round.

== Preliminary round ==
=== Uruguay vs. Cuba ===
Uruguay
5
Carrasco Lawn Tennis Club, Montevideo, Uruguay
4–6 February 1994
Clay

Cuba
0

			1	2	3	4	5
1	(Uruguay) (Cuba)	Marcelo Filippini; Mario Tabares	6; 1	4; 6	6; 3	6; 0
2	(Uruguay) (Cuba)	Diego Pérez; Juan Pino	7; 5	6; 3	6; 1
3	(Uruguay) (Cuba)	Marcelo Filippini / Diego Pérez; Juan Pino / Mario Tabares	7^{10} 6^{8}	6; 2	6; 2
4	(Uruguay) (Cuba)	Marcelo Filippini; Juan Pino	6; 2	7^{7} 6^{4}
5	(Uruguay) (Cuba)	Diego Pérez; Mario Tabares	6; 1	6; 4

=== Peru vs. Mexico ===
Peru
3
Club Lawn Tennis de la Exposición, Lima, Peru
4–6 February 1994
Clay

Mexico
2

			1	2	3	4	5
1	(Peru) (Mexico)	Jaime Yzaga; Luis Herrera	1; 6	6; 3	6; 0	7; 5
2	(Peru) (Mexico)	José Luis Noriega; Oliver Fernández	4; 6	6^{5} 7^{7}	6; 0	6; 3	6; 4
3	(Peru) (Mexico)	José Luis Noriega / Jaime Yzaga; Oliver Fernández / Jorge Lozano	6; 3	2; 6	7^{7} 6^{4}	7; 5
4	(Peru) (Mexico)	Jaime Yzaga; Oliver Fernández	4; 4					retired
5	(Peru) (Mexico)	José Luis Noriega; Luis Herrera	6; 3	0; 6	3; 6

== First round ==
=== Uruguay vs. Bahamas ===
Uruguay
3
Carrasco Lawn Tennis Club, Montevideo, Uruguay
25–27 March 1994
Clay

Bahamas
2

			1	2	3	4	5
1	(Uruguay) (The Bahamas)	Marcelo Filippini; Roger Smith	6; 4	6; 2	6; 4
2	(Uruguay) (The Bahamas)	Diego Pérez; Mark Knowles	1; 6	6; 1	6; 3	6^{3} 7^{7}	6; 4
3	(Uruguay) (The Bahamas)	Marcelo Filippini / Diego Pérez; Mark Knowles / Roger Smith	6^{4} 7^{7}	3; 6	4; 6
4	(Uruguay) (The Bahamas)	Marcelo Filippini; Mark Knowles	6; 1	6; 0	6; 3
5	(Uruguay) (The Bahamas)	Federico Dondo; Roger Smith	4; 6	6; 3	1; 6

=== Peru vs. Chile ===
Peru
3
Club Lawn Tennis de la Exposición, Lima, Peru
25–27 March 1994
Hard

Chile
2

			1	2	3	4	5
1	(Peru) (Chile)	Jaime Yzaga; Gabriel Silberstein	6; 4	6; 4	3; 6	6; 1
2	(Peru) (Chile)	José Luis Noriega; Sergio Cortés	5; 7	6; 3	6^{5} 7^{7}	6; 3	1; 6
3	(Peru) (Chile)	José Luis Noriega / Jaime Yzaga; Marcelo Rebolledo / Gabriel Silberstein	3; 6	7^{7} 6^{4}	6; 3	6; 3
4	(Peru) (Chile)	Jaime Yzaga; Sergio Cortés	6; 2	6; 2	6; 4
5	(Peru) (Chile)	José Luis Noriega; Gabriel Silberstein	6; 1	4; 6	3; 6

== Relegation play-off ==
=== Mexico vs. Cuba ===
Mexico
5
Club Alemán de México, Mexico City, Mexico
25–27 March 1994
Clay

Cuba
0

			1	2	3	4	5
1	(Mexico) (Cuba)	Luis Herrera; Armando Pérez	4; 6	6; 2	6; 4	6; 0
2	(Mexico) (Cuba)	Leonardo Lavalle; Mario Tabares	6; 2	6; 3	6; 1
3	(Mexico) (Cuba)	Luis Herrera / Leonardo Lavalle; Juan Pino / Mario Tabares	6; 4	6; 2	6; 3
4	(Mexico) (Cuba)	Luis Herrera; Mario Tabares	6; 1	7^{7} 6^{5}
5	(Mexico) (Cuba)	Alejandro Hernández; Alexander Tabares	6; 1	6; 2

== Second round ==
=== Uruguay vs. Argentina ===
Uruguay
3
Carrasco Lawn Tennis Club, Montevideo, Uruguay
15–17 July 1994
Clay

Argentina
2

			1	2	3	4	5
1	(Uruguay) (Argentina)	Diego Pérez; Gabriel Markus	2; 6	3; 6	4; 6
2	(Uruguay) (Argentina)	Marcelo Filippini; Javier Frana	7; 5	6; 0	5; 7	6; 4
3	(Uruguay) (Argentina)	Marcelo Filippini / Diego Pérez; Pablo Albano / Javier Frana	7^{7} 6^{5}	3; 6	6; 3	6; 4
4	(Uruguay) (Argentina)	Marcelo Filippini; Gabriel Markus	7; 5	2; 6	2; 6	2; 6
5	(Uruguay) (Argentina)	Diego Pérez; Javier Frana	6; 3	6; 4	7^{7} 6^{5}

=== Peru vs. Brazil ===
Peru
3
Club Lawn Tennis de la Exposición, Lima, Peru
8–10 July 1994
Clay

Brazil
2

			1	2	3	4	5
1	(Peru) (Brazil)	José Luis Noriega; Fernando Meligeni	2; 6	3; 6	6^{4} 7^{7}
2	(Peru) (Brazil)	Jaime Yzaga; Jaime Oncins	1; 6	6; 3	7; 5	6; 1
3	(Peru) (Brazil)	José Luis Noriega / Jaime Yzaga; Jaime Oncins / Fernando Roese	6; 4	7^{7} 6^{4}	3; 6	6; 4
4	(Peru) (Brazil)	Jaime Yzaga; Fernando Meligeni	4; 6	6; 3	6; 4	7^{7} 6^{5}
5	(Peru) (Brazil)	José Luis Noriega; Jaime Oncins	2; 6	2; 6
