= 1993 Davis Cup Americas Zone Group I =

International tennis competition

The Americas Zone was one of the three zones of the regional Davis Cup competition in 1993.

In the Americas Zone there were three different tiers, called groups, in which teams competed against each other to advance to the upper tier. Winners in Group I advanced to the World Group qualifying round, along with losing teams from the World Group first round. Teams who lost in the first round competed in the relegation play-offs, with the winning team remaining in Group I, whereas the losing team was relegated to the Americas Zone Group II in 1994.

== Participating nations ==
- Argentina
- Bahamas
- Canada
- Chile
- Mexico
- Uruguay

=== Draw ===
First Round; 5–7 February
Uruguay
bye
Santiago, Chile (clay)
Bahamas	3
Chile	2
Mexico City, Mexico (clay)
Mexico	4
Canada	1
bye
Argentina

Second Round; 26–28 March
Nassau, Bahamas (hard)
Uruguay	1
Bahamas	4
Buenos Aires, Argentina (clay)
Mexico	1
Argentina	4

- Bahamas and Argentina advance to World Group qualifying round.

Relegation Play-off; 26–28 March
Santiago, Chile (clay)
Chile	3
Canada	1

- Canada relegated to Group II in 1994.

== First round ==
=== Chile vs. Bahamas ===
Chile
2
Estadio Nacional, Santiago, Chile
5–7 February 1993
Clay

Bahamas
3

			1	2	3	4	5
1	(Chile) (The Bahamas)	Felipe Rivera; Roger Smith	6^{3} 7^{7}	4; 6	4; 6
2	(Chile) (The Bahamas)	Sergio Cortés; Mark Knowles	4; 6	3; 6	7^{7} 6^{2}	1; 2		retired
3	(Chile) (The Bahamas)	Marcelo Ríos / Gabriel Silberstein; Mark Knowles / Roger Smith	2; 6	1; 6	3; 6
4	(Chile) (The Bahamas)	Sergio Cortés; Roger Smith	6; 3	6; 1	6; 3
5	(Chile) (The Bahamas)	Felipe Rivera; Mark Knowles	2; 6	3; 6	1; 6

=== Mexico vs. Canada ===
Mexico
4
Club Alemán, Mexico City, Mexico
5–7 February 1993
Clay

Canada
1

			1	2	3	4	5
1	(Mexico) (Canada)	Luis Herrera; Sébastien Lareau	6; 4	6; 4	6; 2
2	(Mexico) (Canada)	Leonardo Lavalle; Andrew Sznajder	6; 2	7^{7} 6^{3}	4; 6	4; 6	6; 4
3	(Mexico) (Canada)	Luis Herrera / Agustín Moreno; Sébastien Lareau / Daniel Nestor	7^{7} 6^{4}	6; 3	4; 6	6^{5} 7^{7}	7; 5
4	(Mexico) (Canada)	Luis Herrera; Andrew Sznajder	7; 5	0; 6	5; 7
5	(Mexico) (Canada)	Leonardo Lavalle; Sébastien Lareau	4; 6	6; 2	6; 3

== Second round ==
=== Bahamas vs. Uruguay ===
Bahamas
4
Nassau Beach Hotel, Nassau, Bahamas
26–28 March 1993
Hard

Uruguay
1

			1	2	3	4	5
1	(The Bahamas) (Uruguay)	Roger Smith; Diego Pérez	6; 2	6; 1	6; 2
2	(The Bahamas) (Uruguay)	Mark Knowles; Marcelo Filippini	7^{7} 6^{5}	2; 6	6; 2	0; 6	6; 1
3	(The Bahamas) (Uruguay)	Mark Knowles / Roger Smith; Marcelo Filippini / Diego Pérez	6; 4	7^{8} 6^{6}	4; 6	3; 6	6; 3
4	(The Bahamas) (Uruguay)	John Farrington; Victor Caldarelli	6^{3} 7^{7}	3; 6
5	(The Bahamas) (Uruguay)	Mark Knowles; Diego Pérez	1; 6	7; 5	7; 5

=== Argentina vs. Mexico ===
Argentina
4
Buenos Aires Lawn Tennis Club, Buenos Aires, Argentina
26–28 March 1993
Clay

Mexico
1

			1	2	3	4	5
1	(Argentina) (Mexico)	Guillermo Pérez Roldán; Luis Herrera	3; 6	3; 6	6; 1	2; 6
2	(Argentina) (Mexico)	Alberto Mancini; Oliver Fernández	6^{3} 7^{7}	6; 1	6; 1	6; 0
3	(Argentina) (Mexico)	Horacio de la Peña / Javier Frana; Luis Herrera / Agustín Moreno	6; 0	6; 3	6; 4
4	(Argentina) (Mexico)	Alberto Mancini; Luis Herrera	6; 3	6; 4	6; 4
5	(Argentina) (Mexico)	Guillermo Pérez Roldán; Oliver Fernández	6^{3} 7^{7}	6; 4	6; 1

== Relegation play-off ==
=== Chile vs. Canada ===
Chile
3
Estadio Nacional, Santiago, Chile
26–28 March 1993
Clay

Canada
1

			1	2	3	4	5
1	(Chile) (Canada)	Sergio Cortés; Sébastien Lareau	7; 5	6; 3	7^{7} 6^{4}
2	(Chile) (Canada)	Marcelo Ríos; Andrew Sznajder	6; 4	4; 6	4; 6	4; 6
3	(Chile) (Canada)	Sergio Cortés / Gabriel Silberstein; Brian Gyetko / Martin Laurendeau	7^{7} 6^{1}	4; 6	7; 5	6; 4
4	(Chile) (Canada)	Sergio Cortés; Andrew Sznajder	6; 2	7^{7} 6^{5}	6^{7} 7^{9}	7; 5
5	(Chile) (Canada)	Marcelo Ríos; Sébastien Lareau						not played
