= Argentina Davis Cup team =

National tennis team

Argentina
- Captain: Javier Frana
- Nations Ranking: 12 ▼ (21 September 2026)
- Highest ranking: 1 (28 November 2016)
- Colors: Light Blue & White
- First year: 1921
- Years played: 71
- Ties played (W–L): 175 (100–75)
- Years in World Group: 32 (46–35)
- Davis Cup titles: 1 (2016)
- Runners-up: 4 (1981, 2006, 2008, 2011)
- Most total wins: Guillermo Vilas (57–24)
- Most singles wins: Guillermo Vilas (45–10)
- Most doubles wins: David Nalbandian (16–5)
- Best doubles team: José Luis Clerc / Guillermo Vilas (7–7)
- Most ties played: Guillermo Vilas (29)
- Most years played: Guillermo Vilas (14)

The Argentina men's national tennis team represents Argentina in Davis Cup tennis competition and is governed by the Asociación Argentina de Tenis. As of 2016, the team has competed in the World Group since 2002 and reached the finals five times (1981, 2006, 2008, 2011 and 2016), winning the cup for the first time in the 2016 edition by defeating Croatia in the final. Argentina is currently #12 in the ITF Davis Cup rankings.

== History ==
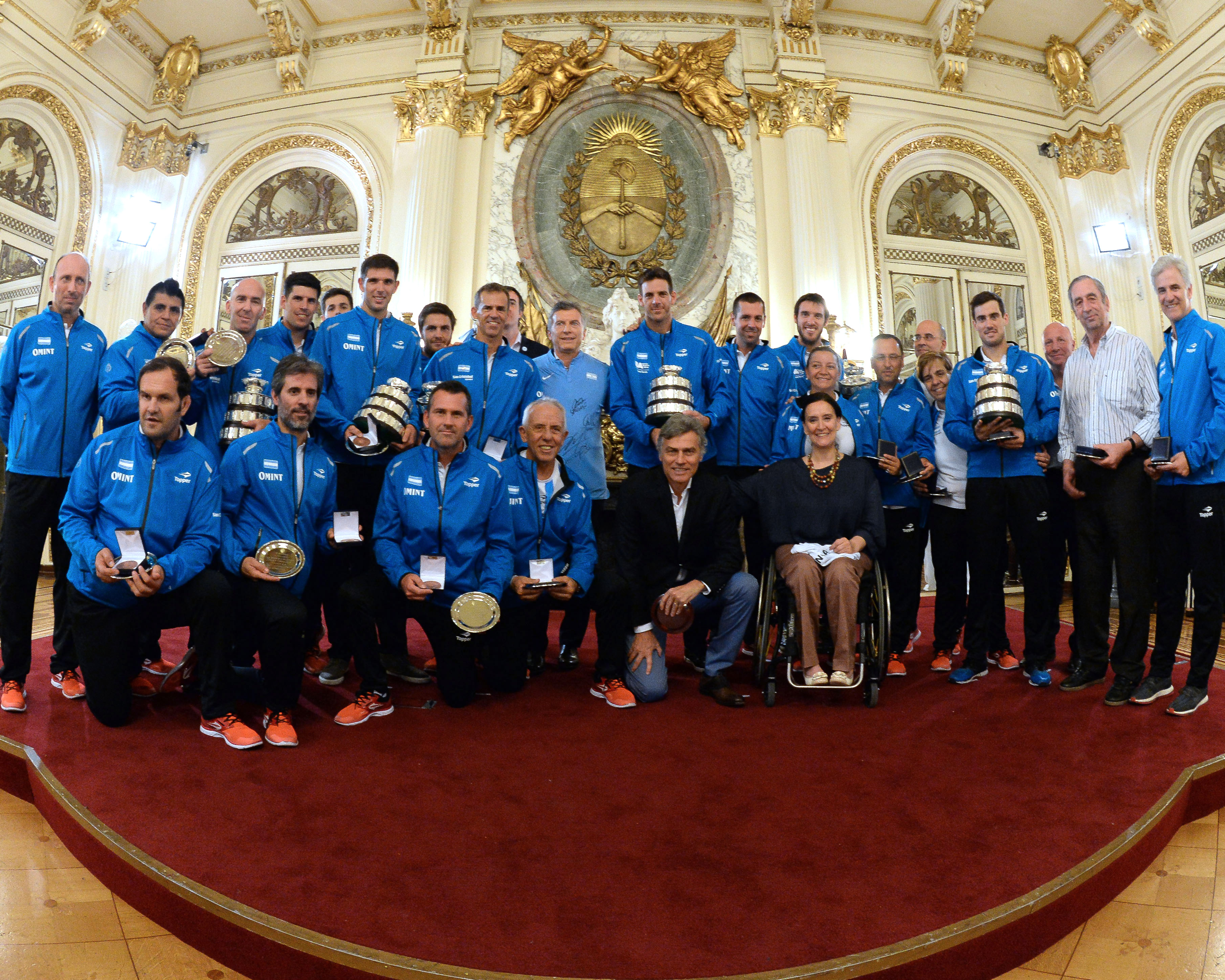
The Argentine team with the trophies won at Casa Rosada, November 2016

Argentina's Davis Cup debut in 1921 started on the wrong foot with a walkover loss to Denmark in the first round. They played their first Davis Cup matches in 1923, losing 1–4 in the first round against Switzerland. After several years of toiling in the regional and preliminary rounds, led by Guillermo Vilas and José Luis Clerc, Argentina reached their first finals in 1981, losing to the United States. After avoiding relegation from the World Group the next year, Argentina reached the semifinals in 1983, losing in Stockholm against the Swedish team.

In the subsequent years, Argentina could not repeat that performance and was relegated to the Americas I Group in 1987. Returned in the 1990-92 World Group, that year was relegated to the Americas Zone again and would not return to main competition until the 2002 Davis Cup, reaching the semifinals again in a loss to Russia that included a historical doubles match between Yevgeny Kafelnikov and Marat Safin against David Nalbandian and Lucas Arnold Ker that at 6 hours and 20 minutes is the longest doubles match in recorded history.

Since 2002, Argentina has reached the finals on four occasions in 2006, 2008, 2011 and 2016. They were crowned as champions for the first time after defeating Croatia in the final in 2016. However, the following year they were relegated to the first group of the Americas Zone.

== Venues ==
Argentina played all of their home games at the Buenos Aires Lawn Tennis Club up until 1996. Since then, other venues were used, not only in Buenos Aires, but also in other cities such as Córdoba, Mendoza and Mar del Plata, the city of choice for the 2008 Finals, the only series of this kind Argentina has hosted so far and also their only home series that was not played on clay. Since 2006, Argentina began to play their home matches at the Mary Terán de Weiss Stadium in Buenos Aires.

== Current team (2024) ==
- Sebastián Báez (singles)
- Francisco Cerúndolo (singles)
- Tomás Martín Etcheverry (singles)
- Máximo González (doubles)
- Andrés Molteni (doubles)

== Recent matches ==
=== 2025 ===
2025 Davis Cup Qualifiers first round

Norway
2
Fjellhamar Arena, Fjellhamar, Norway
30 January–31 January 2025
Hard (i)

Argentina
3

| | | | 1 | 2 | 3 |
|---|---|---|---|---|---|
| 1 | (Norway) (Argentina) | Nicolai Budkov Kjær; Tomás Martín Etcheverry | 5; 7 | 6; 2 | 6^{5} 7^{7} |
| 2 | (Norway) (Argentina) | Casper Ruud; Mariano Navone | 6; 3 | 6; 3 |
| 3 | (Norway) (Argentina) | Viktor Durasovic / Casper Ruud; Andrés Molteni / Horacio Zeballos | 2; 6 | 5; 7 |
| 4 | (Norway) (Argentina) | Casper Ruud; Tomás Martín Etcheverry | 6; 3 | 6; 3 |
| 5 | (Norway) (Argentina) | Nicolai Budkov Kjær; Mariano Navone | 6; 4 | 3; 6 | 4; 6 |

2025 Davis Cup Qualifiers second round

Netherlands
1
MartiniPlaza, Groningen, Netherlands
12–13 September 2025
Hard (i)

Argentina
3

| | | | 1 | 2 | 3 |
|---|---|---|---|---|---|---|
| 1 | (Netherlands) (Argentina) | Jesper de Jong; Tomás Martín Etcheverry | 4; 6 | 4; 6 |
| 2 | (Netherlands) (Argentina) | Botic van de Zandschulp; Francisco Cerúndolo | 6^{4} 7^{7} | 1; 6 |
| 3 | (Netherlands) (Argentina) | Sander Arends / Botic van de Zandschulp; Andrés Molteni / Horacio Zeballos | 3; 6 | 5; 7 |
| 4 | (Netherlands) (Argentina) | Jesper de Jong; Francisco Comesaña | 6; 4 | 6; 3 |
| 5 | (Netherlands) (Argentina) | Botic van de Zandschulp; Tomás Martín Etcheverry | | | | not played |

2025 Davis Cup Quarterfinals

Argentina
1
SuperTennis Arena Bologna Fiere, Bologna
20 November 2025
Hard (i)

Germany
2

| | | | 1 | 2 | 3 |
|---|---|---|---|---|---|
| 1 | (Argentina) (Germany) | Tomás Martín Etcheverry; Jan-Lennard Struff | 7^{7} 6^{3} | 7^{9} 6^{7} |
| 2 | (Argentina) (Germany) | Francisco Cerúndolo; Alexander Zverev | 4; 6 | 6^{3} 7^{7} |
| 3 | (Argentina) (Germany) | Andrés Molteni / Horacio Zeballos; Kevin Krawietz / Tim Pütz | 6; 4 | 4; 6 | 6^{10} 7^{12} |

=== 2026 ===
2026 Davis Cup Qualifiers first round

South Korea
3
Gijang Stadium, Busan, South Korea
7–8 February 2026
Hard (i)

Argentina
2

| | | | 1 | 2 | 3 |
|---|---|---|---|---|---|
| 1 | (South Korea) (Argentina) | Chung Hyeon; Thiago Agustín Tirante | 6; 2 | 5; 7 | 6^{5} 7^{7} |
| 2 | (South Korea) (Argentina) | Kwon Soon-woo; Marco Trungelliti | 7^{8} 6^{6} | 6; 2 |
| 3 | (South Korea) (Argentina) | Nam Ji-sung / Park Ui-sung; Guido Andreozzi / Federico Agustín Gómez | 3; 6 | 5; 7 |
| 4 | (South Korea) (Argentina) | Kwon Soon-woo; Thiago Agustín Tirante | 6; 4 | 4; 6 | 6; 3 |
| 5 | (South Korea) (Argentina) | Chung Hyeon; Marco Trungelliti | 6; 4 | 6; 3 |

2026 Davis Cup World Group I

Argentina
3
Estadio Ruca Che, Neuquén, Argentina
19–20 September 2026
Hard (i)

Turkey
1

| | | | 1 | 2 | 3 |
|---|---|---|---|---|---|---|
| 1 | (Argentina) (Turkey) | Francisco Cerúndolo; Yankı Erel | 6; 0 | 6; 4 |
| 2 | (Argentina) (Turkey) | Thiago Agustín Tirante; Mert Alkaya | 6; 2 | 6; 4 |
| 3 | (Argentina) (Turkey) | Guido Andreozzi / Andrés Molteni; Arda Azkara / Yankı Erel | 4; 6 | 4; 6 |
| 4 | (Argentina) (Turkey) | Francisco Cerúndolo; Mert Alkaya | 6; 1 | 6; 0 |
| 5 | (Argentina) (Turkey) | Thiago Agustín Tirante; Yankı Erel | | | | not played |

== Davis Cup finals ==
| Edition | Rounds/Opponents | Results |
|---|---|---|
| 1981 | 1R: West Germany QF: Romania SF: Great Britain F: United States | 1R: 3–2 QF: 3–2 SF: 5–0 F: 1–3 |
| 2006 | 1R: Sweden QF: Croatia SF: Australia F: Russia | 1R: 5–0 QF: 3–2 SF: 5–0 F: 2–3 |
| 2008 | 1R: Great Britain QF: Sweden SF: Russia F: Spain | 1R: 4–1 QF: 4–1 SF: 3–2 F: 1–3 |
| 2011 | 1R: Romania QF: Kazakhstan SF: Serbia F: Spain | 1R: 4–1 QF: 5–0 SF: 3–2 F: 1–3 |
| 2016 | 1R: Poland QF: Italy SF: Great Britain F: Croatia | 1R: 3–2 QF: 3–1 SF: 3–2 F: 3–2 |

== All-time performances ==
Here is the list of all match-ups of Argentina in the competition.

=== 1920s ===
| Year | Competition | Date | Location | Opponent | Score | Result |
|---|---|---|---|---|---|---|
| 1921 | World Group, Quarterfinals | 1–3 July | – | Denmark | w/o | Loss |
| 1923 | Europe Zone, Europe Zone Quarterfinals | 15–17 June | Geneva (SWI) | Switzerland | 1–4 | Loss |
| 1924 | Europe Zone, Europe Zone Second round | 1–3 May | – | South Africa | w/o | Loss |
| 1926 | Europe Zone, Europe Zone Second Round | 16–18 May | Barcelona (SPA) | Hungary | 3–2 | Win |
| 1926 | Europe Zone, Europe Zone Quarterfinals | 29–31 May | Barcelona (SPA) | Spain | 1–3 | Loss |
| 1928 | Europe Zone, Europe Zone First Round | 3–5 May | Torquay (GBR) | Great Britain | 1–4 | Loss |

=== 1930s ===
| Year | Competition | Date | Location | Opponent | Score | Result |
|---|---|---|---|---|---|---|
| 1931 | Americas Zone, South America Zone Quarterfinals | 26–28 March | Asunción (PAR) | Paraguay | 5–0 | Win |
| 1931 | Americas Zone, South America Zone Semifinals | 2–4 April | Buenos Aires (ARG) | Uruguay | 5–0 | Win |
| 1931 | Americas Zone, South America Zone Final | 24–26 April | Santiago (CHI) | Chile | 3–0 | Win |
| 1931 | Americas Zone, Americas Inter-Zonal Final | 28–30 May | Chevy Chase (USA) | United States | 0–5 | Loss |
| 1933 | Americas Zone, South America Zone Semifinals | 1–3 July | Buenos Aires (ARG) | Peru | w/o | Win |
| 1933 | Americas Zone, South America Zone Final | 8–10 April | Buenos Aires (ARG) | Chile | 4–0 | Win |
| 1933 | Americas Zone, Americas Inter-Zonal Final | 25–27 May | Chevy Chase (USA) | United States | 0–4 | Loss |
| 1936 | Europe Zone, Europe Zone Second Round | 8–10 May | Athens (GRE) | Greece | 4–1 | Win |
| 1936 | Europe Zone, Europe Zone Quarterfinals | 5–7 June | Berlin (GER) | Germany | 1–4 | Loss |

=== 1940s ===
| Year | Competition | Date | Location | Opponent | Score | Result |
|---|---|---|---|---|---|---|
| 1948 | Europe Zone, Europe Zone Second Round | 15–17 May | Brussels (BEL) | Belgium | 2–3 | Loss |
| 1949 | Europe Zone, Europe Zone First Round | 29 April–1 May | – | Egypt | w/o | Loss |

=== 1950s ===
| Year | Competition | Date | Location | Opponent | Score | Result |
|---|---|---|---|---|---|---|
| 1952 | Europe Zone, Europe Zone Second Round | 17–19 May | Lausanne (SWI) | Switzerland | 5–0 | Win |
| 1952 | Europe Zone, Europe Zone Quarterfinals | 13–15 June | Paris (FRA) | France | 2–3 | Loss |
| 1955 | Europe Zone, Europe Zone First Round | 29 April–1 May | Monte Carlo (MON) | Monaco | 3–0 | Win |
| 1955 | Europe Zone, Europe Zone Second Round | 13–15 May | Paris (FRA) | France | 2–3 | Loss |
| 1958 | Americas Zone, South America Zone Quarterfinals | 10–12 July | Buenos Aires (ARG) | Caribbean/West Indies | 5–0 | Win |
| 1958 | Americas Zone, South America Zone Semifinals | 1–3 June | Buenos Aires (ARG) | Israel | 5–0 | Win |
| 1958 | Americas Zone, South America Zone Final | 15–18 August | Rye (USA) | United States | 0–5 | Loss |
| 1959 | Americas Zone, South America Zone Semifinals | 1–3 May | Buenos Aires (ARG) | Venezuela | w/o | Win |
| 1959 | Americas Zone, South America Zone Final | 1–3 June | Havana (CUB) | Cuba | w/o | Loss |

=== 1960s ===
| Year | Competition | Date | Location | Opponent | Score | Result |
|---|---|---|---|---|---|---|
| 1960 | Europe Zone, Europe Zone First Round | 29 April–1 May | Helsinki (FIN) | Finland | 5–0 | Win |
| 1960 | Europe Zone, Europe Zone Second Round | 13–15 May | Paris (FRA) | France | 0–5 | Loss |
| 1964 | Europe Zone, Europe Zone First Round | 1–3 May | Istanbul (TUR) | Turkey | 5–0 | Win |
| 1964 | Europe Zone, Europe Zone Second Round | 10–18 May | Belgrade (YUG) | Yugoslavia | 0–5 | Loss |
| 1966 | Americas Zone, South America Zone Semifinals | 8–10 April | Buenos Aires (ARG) | Chile | 3–2 | Win |
| 1966 | Americas Zone, South America Zone Final | 28–30 May | Mexico City (MEX) | Mexico | 1–4 | Loss |
| 1967 | Americas Zone, South America Zone Semifinals | 30 April–2 May | Buenos Aires (ARG) | Venezuela | 5–0 | Win |
| 1967 | Americas Zone, South America Zone Final | 9–11 April | Buenos Aires (ARG) | Ecuador | 1–4 | Loss |
| 1968 | Americas Zone, South America Zone Quarterfinals | 27–29 April | Caracas (VEN) | Venezuela | 2–3 | Loss |
| 1969 | Americas Zone, South America Zone Quarterfinals | 2–4 May | Santiago (CHI) | Chile | 2–3 | Loss |

=== 1970s ===
| Year | Competition | Date | Location | Opponent | Score | Result |
|---|---|---|---|---|---|---|
| 1970 | Americas Zone, South America Zone Quarterfinals | 20–22 March | Buenos Aires (ARG) | Chile | 2–3 | Loss |
| 1971 | Americas Zone, South America Zone Quarterfinals | 20–22 March | Montevideo (URU) | Uruguay | 5–0 | Win |
| 1971 | Americas Zone, South America Zone Semifinals | 9–11 April | Santiago (CHI) | Chile | 1–4 | Loss |
| 1972 | Americas Zone, South America Zone Semifinals | 8–10 April | Rio de Janeiro (BRA) | Brazil | 2–3 | Loss |
| 1973 | Americas Zone, South America Zone First Round | 23–25 February | Buenos Aires (ARG) | Ecuador | 5–0 | Win |
| 1973 | Americas Zone, South America Zone Qualifying | 23–25 March | Buenos Aires (ARG) | Brazil | 4–1 | Win |
| 1973 | Americas Zone, South America Zone Semifinals | 13–15 April | Montevideo (URU) | South Africa | 4–1 | Win |
| 1973 | Americas Zone, South America Zone Final | 4–6 May | Buenos Aires (ARG) | Chile | 2–3 | Loss |
| 1974 | Americas Zone, South America Zone Semifinals | – | – | South Africa | w/o | Loss |
| 1975 | Americas Zone, South America Zone Qualifying | 15–17 November 1974 | Montevideo (URU) | Uruguay | 5–0 | Win |
| 1975 | Americas Zone, South America Zone Semifinals | 20–22 December 1974 | São Paulo (BRA) | Brazil | 2–3 | Loss |
| 1976 | Americas Zone, South America Zone Qualifying | 31 October–2 November 1975 | Guayaquil (ECU) | Ecuador | 5–0 | Win |
| 1976 | Americas Zone, South America Zone Quarterfinals | 26–28 December 1975 | Buenos Aires (ARG) | Brazil | 5–0 | Win |
| 1976 | Americas Zone, South America Zone Semifinals | 5–7 March | Santiago (CHI) | Chile | 2–3 | Loss |
| 1977 | Americas Zone, South America Zone Qualifying | 12–14 November 1976 | Buenos Aires (ARG) | Ecuador | 4–1 | Win |
| 1977 | Americas Zone, South America Zone Quarterfinals | 17–19 December 1976 | São Paulo (BRA) | Brazil | 3–2 | Win |
| 1977 | Americas Zone, South America Zone Semifinals | 18–20 March | Buenos Aires (ARG) | Chile | 4–1 | Win |
| 1977 | Americas Zone, South America Zone Final | 28 April–1 May | Buenos Aires (ARG) | United States | 3–2 | Win |
| 1977 | Inter-Zonal Zone, Semifinals | 14–16 September | Buenos Aires (ARG) | Australia | 2–3 | Loss |
| 1978 | Americas Zone, South America Zone Final | 17–19 March | Santiago (CHI) | Chile | 2–3 | Loss |
| 1979 | Americas Zone, South America Zone Qualifying | 27–29 October 1978 | Guayaquil (ECU) | Ecuador | 4–1 | Win |
| 1979 | Americas Zone, South America Zone Semifinals | 8–10 December 1978 | Buenos Aires (ARG) | Brazil | 5–0 | Win |
| 1979 | Americas Zone, South America Zone Final | 16–18 March | Buenos Aires (ARG) | Chile | 3–2 | Win |
| 1979 | Americas Zone, Americas Inter-Zonal Final | 14–16 September | Memphis (USA) | United States | 1–4 | Loss |

=== 1980s ===
| Year | Competition | Date | Location | Opponent | Score | Result |
|---|---|---|---|---|---|---|
| 1980 | Americas Zone, South America Zone Final | 1–3 February | São Paulo (BRA) | Brazil | 4–1 | Win |
| 1980 | Americas Zone, Americas Inter-Zonal Final | 7–9 March | Buenos Aires (ARG) | United States | 4–1 | Win |
| 1980 | Inter-Zonal Zone, Semifinals | 19–21 September | Buenos Aires (ARG) | Czechoslovakia | 2–3 | Loss |
| 1981 | World Group, 1st Round | 6–8 March | Munich (FRG) | West Germany | 3–2 | Win |
| 1981 | World Group, Quarterfinals | 9–11 July | Timișoara (ROU) | Romania | 3–2 | Win |
| 1981 | World Group, Semifinals | 2–4 October | Buenos Aires (ARG) | Great Britain | 5–0 | Win |
| 1981 | World Group, Final | 11–13 December | Cincinnati (USA) | United States | 1–3 | Runner-up |
| 1982 | World Group, 1st Round | 5–7 March | Buenos Aires (ARG) | France | 2–3 | Loss |
| 1982 | World Group Playoffs | 1–3 October | Buenos Aires (ARG) | West Germany | 3–2 | Win |
| 1983 | World Group, 1st Round | 4–6 March | Buenos Aires (ARG) | United States | 3–2 | Win |
| 1983 | World Group, Quarterfinals | 8–10 July | Rome (ITA) | Italy | 5–0 | Win |
| 1983 | World Group, Semifinals | 30 September– 2 October | Stockholm (SWE) | Sweden | 1–4 | Loss |
| 1984 | World Group, 1st Round | 24–26 February | Stuttgart (FRG) | West Germany | 4–1 | Win |
| 1984 | World Group, Quarterfinals | 13–15 July | Atlanta (USA) | United States | 0–5 | Loss |
| 1985 | World Group, 1st Round | 8–10 March | Buenos Aires (ECU) | Ecuador | 1–4 | Loss |
| 1985 | World Group Playoffs | 1–3 October | Buenos Aires (ARG) | Soviet Union | 2–3 | Loss |
| 1986 | Americas Group I, Quarterfinals | 7–9 March | Buenos Aires (ARG) | Uruguay | 5–0 | Win |
| 1986 | Americas Group I, Semifinals | 18–20 July | Buenos Aires (ARG) | Peru | 3–2 | Win |
| 1986 | Americas Group I, Final | 3–5 October | Santiago (CHI) | Chile | 4–1 | Win |
| 1987 | World Group, 1st Round | 13–15 March | New Delhi (IND) | India | 2–3 | Loss |
| 1987 | World Group Playoffs | 24–26 July | Prague (TCH) | Czechoslovakia | 0–5 | Loss |
| 1988 | Americas Group I, Semifinals | 8–10 April | Guayaquil (ECU) | Ecuador | 4–1 | Win |
| 1988 | Americas Group I, Final | 22–24 July | Buenos Aires (ARG) | United States | 1–4 | Loss |
| 1989 | Americas Group I, Semifinals | 7–8 April | Buenos Aires (ARG) | Canada | 3–0 | Win |
| 1989 | World Group, Qualifying Round | 20–22 July | Eastbourne (GBR) | Great Britain | 3–2 | Win |

=== 1990s ===
| Year | Competition | Date | Location | Opponent | Score | Result |
|---|---|---|---|---|---|---|
| 1990 | World Group, 1st Round | 2–4 February | Buenos Aires (ARG) | Israel | 3–0 | Win |
| 1990 | World Group, Quarterfinals | 30 March – 2 April | Buenos Aires (ARG) | Germany | 3–2 | Win |
| 1990 | World Group, Semifinals | 21–23 September | Sydney (AUS) | Australia | 0–5 | Loss |
| 1991 | World Group, 1st Round | 1 February – 31 March | Christchurch (NZL) | New Zealand | 4–1 | Win |
| 1991 | World Group, Quarterfinals | 30 March – 1 April | Berlin (GER) | Germany | 0–5 | Loss |
| 1992 | World Group, 1st Round | 31 January – 2 February | Hawaii (USA) | United States | 0–5 | Loss |
| 1992 | World Group, Qualifying Round | 25–27 September | Aarhus (DEN) | Denmark | 2–3 | Loss |
| 1993 | American Group I, Semifinals | 26–28 March | Buenos Aires (ARG) | Mexico | 4–1 | Win |
| 1993 | World Group, Qualifying Round | 22–26 September | Budapest (HUN) | Hungary | 1–4 | Loss |
| 1994 | Americas Group I, Semifinals | 15–17 July | Montevideo (URU) | Uruguay | 2–3 | Loss |
| 1995 | Americas Group I, 1st Round | 3–5 February | Buenos Aires (ARG) | Chile | 3–2 | Win |
| 1995 | Americas Group I, Semifinals | 31 March – 2 April | Caracas (VEN) | Venezuela | 2–3 | Loss |
| 1996 | Americas Group I, Semifinals | 5–7 April | Mar del Plata (ARG) | Bahamas | 4–1 | Win |
| 1996 | World Group, Qualifying Round | 20–22 September | Mexico City (MEX) | Mexico | 2–3 | Loss |
| 1997 | Americas Group I, Semifinals | 4–6 April | Santiago (CHI) | Chile | 2–3 | Loss |
| 1997 | Americas Group I, Relegation playoff | 11–14 July | Buenos Aires (ARG) | Ecuador | 1–3 | Loss |
| 1997 | American Group I, Relegation playoff | 19–21 September | Buenos Aires (ARG) | Venezuela | 4–1 | Win |
| 1998 | Americas Group I, 1st Round | 13–15 February | Buenos Aires (ARG) | Colombia | 5–0 | Win |
| 1998 | Americas Group I, Semifinals | 3–5 April | Buenos Aires (ARG) | Chile | 4–1 | Win |
| 1998 | World Group, Qualifying Round | 25–28 September | Buenos Aires (ARG) | Slovakia | 2–3 | Loss |
| 1999 | Americas Group I, Semifinals | 2–4 April | Salinas (ECU) | Ecuador | 1–4 | Loss |
| 1999 | Americas Group I, Relegation playoff | 16–18 July | Caracas (VEN) | Venezuela | 4–1 | Win |

=== 2000s ===
| Year | Competition | Date | Location | Opponent | Score | Result |
|---|---|---|---|---|---|---|
| 2000 | Americas Group I, Semifinals | 7–9 April | Santiago (CHI) | Chile | 0–2 | Loss |
| 2000 | Americas Group I, Relegation playoff I | 21–23 July | Montreal (CAN) | Canada | 1–4 | Loss |
| 2000 | Americas Group I, Relegation playoff II | 6–8 October | Bogotá (COL) | Colombia | 4–1 | Win |
| 2001 | Americas Group I, 1st Round | 9–11 February | Mendoza (ARG) | Mexico | 5–0 | Win |
| 2001 | Americas Group I, Semifinals | 6–8 April | Córdoba (ARG) | Canada | 5–0 | Win |
| 2001 | World Group, Qualifying Round | 21–23 September | Córdoba (ARG) | Belarus | 5–0 | Win |
| 2002 | World Group, 1st Round | 8–10 February | Buenos Aires (ARG) | Australia | 5–0 | Win |
| 2002 | World Group, Quarterfinals | 5–7 April | Buenos Aires (ARG) | Croatia | 3–2 | Win |
| 2002 | World Group, Semifinals | 20–22 September | Moscow (RUS) | Russia | 2–3 | Loss |
| 2003 | World Group, 1st Round | 7–9 February | Buenos Aires (ARG) | Germany | 5–0 | Win |
| 2003 | World Group, Quarterfinals | 4–6 April | Buenos Aires (ARG) | Russia | 5–0 | Win |
| 2003 | World Group, Semifinals | 19–21 September | Málaga (SPA) | Spain | 2–3 | Loss |
| 2004 | World Group, 1st Round | 6–8 February | Agadir (MAR) | Morocco | 5–0 | Win |
| 2004 | World Group, Quarterfinals | 9–11 April | Minsk (BLR) | Belarus | 0–5 | Loss |
| 2005 | World Group, 1st Round | 4–6 March | Buenos Aires (ARG) | Czech Republic | 5–0 | Win |
| 2005 | World Group, Quarterfinals | 15–17 July | Sydney (AUS) | Australia | 4–1 | Win |
| 2005 | World Group, Semifinals | 23–25 September | Bratislava (SVK) | Slovakia | 1–4 | Loss |
| 2006 | World Group, 1st Round | 10–12 February | Buenos Aires (ARG) | Sweden | 5–0 | Win |
| 2006 | World Group, Quarterfinals | 7–9 April | Zagreb (CRO) | Croatia | 3–2 | Win |
| 2006 | World Group, Semifinals | 22–24 September | Buenos Aires (ARG) | Australia | 5–0 | Win |
| 2006 | World Group, Final | 1–3 December | Moscow (RUS) | Russia | 2–3 | Runner-up |
| 2007 | World Group, 1st Round | 9–11 February | Linz (AUT) | Austria | 4–1 | Win |
| 2007 | World Group, Quarterfinals | 6–8 April | Gothenburg (SWE) | Sweden | 1–4 | Loss |
| 2008 | World Group, 1st Round | 8–10 February | Buenos Aires (ARG) | Great Britain | 4–1 | Win |
| 2008 | World Group, Quarterfinals | 11–13 April | Buenos Aires (ARG) | Sweden | 4–1 | Win |
| 2008 | World Group, Semifinals | 19–21 September | Buenos Aires (ARG) | Russia | 3–2 | Win |
| 2008 | World Group, Final | 21–23 November | Mar del Plata (ARG) | Spain | 2–3 | Runner-up |
| 2009 | World Group, 1st Round | 6–8 March | Buenos Aires (ARG) | Netherlands | 5–0 | Win |
| 2009 | World Group, Quarterfinals | 10–12 July | Ostrava (CZE) | Czech Republic | 2–3 | Loss |

=== 2010s ===
| Year | Competition | Date | Location | Opponent | Score | Result |
|---|---|---|---|---|---|---|
| 2010 | World Group, 1st Round | 5–7 March | Stockholm (SWE) | Sweden | 3–2 | Win |
| 2010 | World Group, Quarterfinals | 9–11 July | Moscow (RUS) | Russia | 3–2 | Win |
| 2010 | World Group, Semifinals | 17–19 September | Lyon (FRA) | France | 0–5 | Loss |
| 2011 | World Group, 1st Round | 4–6 March | Buenos Aires (ARG) | Romania | 4–1 | Win |
| 2011 | World Group, Quarterfinals | 7–9 July | Buenos Aires (ARG) | Kazakhstan | 5–0 | Win |
| 2011 | World Group, Semifinals | 16–18 September | Belgrade (SRB) | Serbia | 3–2 | Win |
| 2011 | World Group, Final | 2–4 December | Seville (SPA) | Spain | 1–3 | Runner-up |
| 2012 | World Group, 1st Round | 10–12 February | Bamberg (GER) | Germany | 4–1 | Win |
| 2012 | World Group, Quarterfinals | 6–8 April | Buenos Aires (ARG) | Croatia | 4–1 | Win |
| 2012 | World Group, Semifinals | 14–16 September | Buenos Aires (ARG) | Czech Republic | 2–3 | Loss |
| 2013 | World Group, 1st Round | 1–3 February | Buenos Aires (ARG) | Germany | 5–0 | Win |
| 2013 | World Group, Quarterfinals | 5–7 April | Buenos Aires (ARG) | France | 3–2 | Win |
| 2013 | World Group, Semifinals | 13–15 September | Prague (CZE) | Czech Republic | 2–3 | Loss |
| 2014 | World Group, 1st Round | 31 January – 2 February | Mar del Plata (ARG) | Italy | 1–3 | Loss |
| 2014 | World Group, Relegation playoff | 12–14 September | Sunrise (USA) | Israel | 3–2 | Win |
| 2015 | World Group, 1st Round | 6–8 March | Buenos Aires (ARG) | Brazil | 3–2 | Win |
| 2015 | World Group, Quarterfinals | 17–19 July | Buenos Aires (ARG) | Serbia | 4–1 | Win |
| 2015 | World Group, Semifinals | 18–20 September | Brussels (BEL) | Belgium | 2–3 | Loss |
| 2016 | World Group, 1st Round | 4–6 March | Gdańsk (POL) | Poland | 3–2 | Win |
| 2016 | World Group, Quarterfinals | 15–17 July | Pesaro (ITA) | Italy | 3–1 | Win |
| 2016 | World Group, Semifinals | 16–18 September | Glasgow (GBR) | Great Britain | 3–2 | Win |
| 2016 | World Group, Final | 25–27 November | Zagreb (CRO) | Croatia | 3–2 | Champion |
| 2017 | World Group, 1st Round | 3–5 February | Buenos Aires (ARG) | Italy | 2–3 | Loss |
| 2017 | World Group, Relegation playoff | 15–17 September | Astana (KAZ) | Kazakhstan | 2–3 | Loss |
| 2018 | Americas Group I, 2nd Round | 6–7 April | San Juan (ARG) | Chile | 3–2 | Win |
| 2018 | World Group, Relegation playoff | 14–16 September | San Juan (ARG) | Colombia | 4–0 | Win |
| 2019 | World Group, Group Stage | 19 November | Madrid (SPA) | Chile | 3–0 | Win |
| 2019 | World Group, Group Stage | 20 November | Madrid (SPA) | Germany | 0–3 | Loss |
| 2019 | World Group, Quarterfinals | 22 November | Madrid (SPA) | Spain | 1–2 | Loss |

=== 2020s ===
| Year | Competition | Date | Location | Opponent | Score | Result |
|---|---|---|---|---|---|---|
| 2020–21 | Qualifying Round | 6–7 March 2020 | Bogotá (COL) | Colombia | 1–3 | Loss |
| 2020–21 | World Group I | 18–19 September 2021 | Buenos Aires (ARG) | Belarus | 4–1 | Win |
| 2022 | Qualifying Round | 4–5 March | Buenos Aires (ARG) | Czech Republic | 4–0 | Win |
| 2022 | Finals, Group Stage | 13 September | Bologna (ITA) | Sweden | 1–2 | Loss |
| 2022 | Finals, Group Stage | 16 September | Bologna (ITA) | Italy | 1–2 | Loss |
| 2022 | Finals, Group Stage | 17 September | Bologna (ITA) | Croatia | 0–3 | Loss |
| 2023 | Qualifying Round | 4–5 February | Espoo (FIN) | Finland | 1–3 | Loss |
| 2023 | World Group I | 16–17 September | Buenos Aires (ARG) | Lithuania | 4–0 | Win |
| 2024 | Qualifying Round | 3–4 February | Rosario (ARG) | Kazakhstan | 3–2 | Win |
| 2024 | Finals, Group Stage | 10 September | Manchester (GBR) | Canada | 1–2 | Loss |
| 2024 | Finals, Group Stage | 13 September | Manchester (GBR) | Great Britain | 2–1 | Win |
| 2024 | Finals, Group Stage | 14 September | Manchester (GBR) | Finland | 3–0 | Win |
| 2024 | Finals, Quarterfinals | 22 November | Málaga (ESP) | Italy | 1–2 | Loss |
| 2025 | Qualifiers, First Round | 30–31 January | Fjellhamar (NOR) | Norway | 3–2 | Win |
| 2025 | Qualifiers, Second Round | 12–14 September | Groningen (NED) | Netherlands | 3–1 | Win |
| 2025 | Final 8, Quarterfinals | 20 November | Bologna (ITA) | Germany | 1–2 | Loss |
| 2026 | Qualifiers, First Round | 7–8 February | Busan (KOR) | South Korea | 2–3 | Loss |
| 2026 | World Group I | 18–20 September | Neuquén (ARG) | Turkey | 3–1 | Win |

== Statistics ==
=== Head-to-head records ===
The statistics reflect results since Argentina debut in the competition, and are up-to-date as of the 2026 Davis Cup World Group I.

Record against countries

| DC team | Ties | Won | Lost |
|---|---|---|---|
| Australia | 5 | 3 | 2 |
| Austria | 1 | 1 | 0 |
| Bahamas | 1 | 1 | 0 |
| Belarus | 3 | 2 | 1 |
| Belgium | 2 | 0 | 2 |
| Brazil | 8 | 6 | 2 |
| Canada | 4 | 2 | 2 |
| Caribbean/West Indies | 1 | 1 | 0 |
| Chile | 18 | 10 | 8 |
| Colombia | 4 | 3 | 1 |
| Croatia | 5 | 4 | 1 |
| Cuba | 1 | 0 | 1 |
| Czech Republic* | 7 | 2 | 5 |
| Denmark | 2 | 0 | 2 |
| Ecuador | 9 | 5 | 4 |
| Egypt | 1 | 0 | 1 |
| Finland | 3 | 2 | 1 |
| France | 6 | 1 | 5 |
| Germany** | 11 | 7 | 4 |
| Great Britain | 6 | 5 | 1 |
| Greece | 1 | 1 | 0 |
| Hungary | 2 | 1 | 1 |
| India | 1 | 0 | 1 |
| Israel | 3 | 3 | 0 |
| Italy | 6 | 2 | 4 |
| Kazakhstan | 3 | 2 | 1 |
| Lithuania | 1 | 1 | 0 |
| Mexico | 4 | 2 | 2 |
| Monaco | 1 | 1 | 0 |
| Morocco | 1 | 1 | 0 |
| Netherlands | 2 | 2 | 0 |
| New Zealand | 1 | 1 | 0 |
| Norway | 1 | 1 | 0 |
| Paraguay | 1 | 1 | 0 |
| Peru | 2 | 2 | 0 |
| Poland | 1 | 1 | 0 |
| Romania | 2 | 2 | 0 |
| Russia*** | 6 | 3 | 3 |
| Serbia**** | 3 | 2 | 1 |
| Slovakia | 2 | 0 | 2 |
| South Africa | 3 | 1 | 2 |
| South Korea | 1 | 0 | 1 |
| Spain | 5 | 0 | 5 |
| Sweden | 6 | 3 | 3 |
| Switzerland | 2 | 1 | 1 |
| Turkey | 3 | 3 | 0 |
| United States | 11 | 3 | 8 |
| Uruguay | 5 | 4 | 1 |
| Venezuela | 6 | 4 | 2 |
| Total (49) | 184 | 103 | 81 |

* includes Czechoslovakia (0–2)
** includes West Germany (3–0)
*** includes Soviet Union (0–1)
**** includes Yugoslavia (0–1)

Record against continents

| Africa | Asia | Oceania |
|---|---|---|
| Egypt; Morocco; South Africa | India; Kazakhstan; South Korea | Australia; New Zealand |
| Record: 2–3 | Record: 2–3 | Record: 4–2 |
| Europe | North America | South America |
| Austria; Belarus; Belgium; Croatia; Czech Republic*; Denmark; Finland; France; Germany**; Great Britain; Greece; Hungary; Israel; Italy; Lithuania; Monaco; Netherlands; Norway; Poland; Romania; Russia***; Serbia****; Slovakia; Spain; Sweden; Switzerland; Turkey | Bahamas; Canada; Caribbean/West Indies; Cuba; Mexico; United States | Brazil; Chile; Colombia; Ecuador; Paraguay; Peru; Uruguay; Venezuela |
| Record: 51–42 | Record: 9–13 | Record: 35–18 |

Records by decade

- 1920–1929: 1–5
- 1930–1939: 6–3
- 1940–1949: 0–2
- 1950–1959: 5–4
- 1960–1969: 4–6
- 1970–1979: 14–10
- 1980–1989: 15–10
- 1990–1999: 10–12
- 2000–2009: 19–10
- 2010–2019: 19–10
- 2020–2029: 10–9
- Total: 103–81

== See also ==
- Davis Cup
- Argentina Billie Jean King Cup team
- Argentina at the Hopman Cup
