= 1998 Davis Cup Americas Zone Group I =

International tennis competition

The Americas Zone was one of the three zones of the regional Davis Cup competition in 1998.

In the Americas Zone there were four different tiers, called groups, in which teams competed against each other to advance to the upper tier. Winners in Group I advanced to the World Group qualifying round, along with losing teams from the World Group first round. Teams who lost their respective ties competed in the relegation play-offs, with winning teams remaining in Group I, whereas teams who lost their play-offs were relegated to the Americas Zone Group II in 1999.

== Participating nations ==
- Argentina
- Bahamas
- Canada
- Chile
- Colombia
- Ecuador
- Mexico

=== Draw ===
Second Round Play-offs
Cali, Colombia (clay)
Colombia	3
Mexico	2

First Round Play-offs
Santiago, Chile (indoor carpet)
Chile	5
Colombia	0
Zapopan, Mexico (clay)
Bahamas	3
Mexico	2

First Round
Chile
bye
Buenos Aires, Argentina (clay)
Colombia	0
Argentina	5
Nassau, Bahamas (hard)
Ecuador	5
Bahamas	0
Halifax, Canada (indoor hard)
Canada	3
Mexico	2

Second Round
Buenos Aires, Argentina (clay)
Chile	1
Argentina	4
Guayaquil, Ecuador (clay)
Ecuador	3
Canada	2

- Mexico relegated to Group II in 1999.
- Argentina and Ecuador advance to World Group qualifying round.

== First round ==
=== Argentina vs. Colombia ===
Argentina
5
Mayling Country Club, Buenos Aires, Argentina
13–15 February 1998
Clay

Colombia
0

			1	2	3	4	5
1	(Argentina) (Colombia)	Lucas Arnold Ker; Mario Rincón	6; 0	6; 2	6; 2
2	(Argentina) (Colombia)	Franco Squillari; Miguel Tobón	6; 2	6; 1	6; 1
3	(Argentina) (Colombia)	Lucas Arnold Ker / Luis Lobo; Mario Rincón / Miguel Tobón	6; 2	7; 5	6; 1
4	(Argentina) (Colombia)	Franco Squillari; Philippe Moggio	6; 1	6; 4
5	(Argentina) (Colombia)	Guillermo Cañas; Eduardo Rincón	6; 2	7^{7} 6^{5}

=== Bahamas vs. Ecuador ===
Bahamas
0
Beach Hotel, Nassau, Bahamas
13–15 February 1998
Hard

Ecuador
5

			1	2	3	4	5
1	(The Bahamas) (Ecuador)	Mark Knowles; Luis Morejón	4; 6	0; 6	0; 6
2	(The Bahamas) (Ecuador)	Roger Smith; Nicolás Lapentti	1; 6	2; 6	2; 6
3	(The Bahamas) (Ecuador)	John Farrington / Roger Smith; Andrés Gómez / Nicolás Lapentti	4; 6	0; 6	4; 6
4	(The Bahamas) (Ecuador)	Bjorn Munroe; Giovanni Lapentti	3; 6	6^{2} 7^{7}
5	(The Bahamas) (Ecuador)	John Farrington; Luis Morejón	2; 6	1; 6

=== Canada vs. Mexico ===
Canada
3
Air Atlantic Centre, Halifax, Canada
13–15 February 1998
Hard (indoors)

Mexico
2

			1	2	3	4	5
1	(Canada) (Mexico)	Sébastien Lareau; Alejandro Hernández	6; 4	6^{4} 7^{7}	2; 6	1; 6
2	(Canada) (Mexico)	Daniel Nestor; Luis Herrera	6; 4	6^{5} 7^{7}	1; 6	6; 4	6; 3
3	(Canada) (Mexico)	Sébastien Lareau / Daniel Nestor; Alejandro Hernández / David Roditi	6; 1	6; 2	6; 4
4	(Canada) (Mexico)	Bobby Kokavec; Alejandro Hernández	2; 6	0; 6	3; 6
5	(Canada) (Mexico)	Sébastien Lareau; Luis Herrera	6; 4	6; 3	6; 3

== Second round ==
=== Argentina vs. Chile ===
Argentina
4
Buenos Aires Lawn Tennis Club, Buenos Aires, Argentina
3–5 April 1998
Clay

Chile
1

			1	2	3	4	5
1	(Argentina) (Chile)	Hernán Gumy; Marcelo Ríos	4; 6	6; 3	3; 6	5; 7
2	(Argentina) (Chile)	Franco Squillari; Hermes Gamonal	6; 2	6; 4	6; 2
3	(Argentina) (Chile)	Lucas Arnold Ker / Luis Lobo; Nicolás Massú / Marcelo Ríos	7; 5	6; 3	6; 3
4	(Argentina) (Chile)	Franco Squillari; Fernando González	6; 3	4; 6	6; 2	6; 0
5	(Argentina) (Chile)	Hernán Gumy; Hermes Gamonal	7; 5	6; 1

=== Ecuador vs. Canada ===
Ecuador
3
Guayaquil Tennis Club, Guayaquil, Ecuador
3–5 April 1998
Clay

Canada
2

			1	2	3	4	5
1	(Ecuador) (Canada)	Nicolás Lapentti; Sébastien Lareau	6; 2	6; 3	0; 6	6; 3
2	(Ecuador) (Canada)	Luis Morejón; Daniel Nestor	6; 2	3; 6	7; 5	6; 2
3	(Ecuador) (Canada)	Andrés Gómez / Nicolás Lapentti; Sébastien Lareau / Daniel Nestor	6; 4	4; 6	2; 6	3; 6
4	(Ecuador) (Canada)	Nicolás Lapentti; Daniel Nestor	6; 1	7; 5	6; 2
5	(Ecuador) (Canada)	Giovanni Lapentti; Jocelyn Robichaud	3; 6	6^{2} 7^{7}

== First round relegation play-offs ==
=== Chile vs. Colombia ===
Chile
5
San Miguel Gymnasium, Santiago, Chile
17–19 July 1998
Carpet (indoors)

Colombia
0

			1	2	3	4	5
1	(Chile) (Colombia)	Marcelo Ríos; Philippe Moggio	6; 3	6; 0	6; 2
2	(Chile) (Colombia)	Nicolás Massú; Miguel Tobón	6; 2	6; 4	6; 2
3	(Chile) (Colombia)	Fernando González / Nicolás Massú; Philippe Moggio / Miguel Tobón	6^{7} 7^{9}	7; 5	7^{8} 6^{6}	6; 4
4	(Chile) (Colombia)	Marcelo Ríos; Miguel Tobón	6; 2	6; 2
5	(Chile) (Colombia)	Nicolás Massú; Jaime Cortés	6; 1	2; 0				retired

=== Mexico vs. Bahamas ===
Mexico
2
Puerta de Hierro, Zapopan, Mexico
17–19 July 1998
Clay

Bahamas
3

			1	2	3	4	5
1	(Mexico) (The Bahamas)	Luis Herrera; Mark Knowles	3; 6	6; 1	2; 6	2; 6
2	(Mexico) (The Bahamas)	Alejandro Hernández; Roger Smith	6; 3	6; 1	6; 3
3	(Mexico) (The Bahamas)	David Roditi / Mariano Sánchez; Mark Knowles / Roger Smith	5; 7	6^{5} 7^{7}	5; 7
4	(Mexico) (The Bahamas)	Alejandro Hernández; Mark Knowles	6; 4	3; 6	6; 1	2; 6	1; 6
5	(Mexico) (The Bahamas)	Mariano Sánchez; Dentry Mortimer	6; 2	6; 0

== Second round relegation play-offs ==
=== Colombia vs. Mexico ===
Colombia
3
Andes Golf Club, Cali, Colombia
25–27 September 1998
Clay

Mexico
2

			1	2	3	4	5
1	(Colombia) (Mexico)	Miguel Tobón; Alejandro Hernández	6^{4} 7^{7}	3; 6	3; 6
2	(Colombia) (Mexico)	Mauricio Hadad; Mariano Sánchez	5; 7	6; 3	6; 3	6; 4
3	(Colombia) (Mexico)	Mauricio Hadad / Miguel Tobón; Marco Osorio / David Roditi	7^{7} 6^{3}	6; 4	5; 7	6^{5} 7^{7}	7; 5
4	(Colombia) (Mexico)	Mauricio Hadad; Alejandro Hernández	6; 4	6; 3	6; 1
5	(Colombia) (Mexico)	Miguel Tobón; Mariano Sánchez	6; 3	1; 6	5; 7
