= 1996 Davis Cup Americas Zone Group I =

The Americas Zone was one of the three regional Davis Cup competition zones in 1996.

In the Americas Zone, there were three different tiers, called groups, in which teams competed against each other to advance to the upper tier. Winners in Group I advanced to the World Group qualifying round, along with losing teams from the World Group first round. Teams that lost their respective ties competed in the relegation play-offs, with the winning teams remaining in Group I. In contrast, teams who lost their play-offs were relegated to the Americas Zone Group II in 1997.

== Participating nations ==
- Argentina
- Bahamas
- Brazil
- Canada
- Chile
- Peru
- Venezuela

=== Draw ===
Second Round Play-offs
Santiago, Chile (clay)
Peru	0
Chile	5

First Round Play-offs
Edmonton, Canada (indoor carpet)
Chile	2
Canada	3

First Round
Nassau, Bahamas (hard)
Peru	2
Bahamas	3
Santiago, Chile (clay)
Brazil	3
Chile	2
Valencia, Venezuela (hard)
Canada	2
Venezuela	3

Second Round
Mar del Plata, Argentina (clay)
Argentina	4
Bahamas	1
Santos, Brazil (clay)
Brazil	4
Venezuela	1

- Peru was relegated to Group II in 1997.
- Argentina and Brazil advance to the World Group qualifying round.

== First round ==
=== Bahamas vs. Peru ===
Bahamas
3
Beach Hotel, Nassau, Bahamas
9–11 February 1996
Hard

Peru
2

			1	2	3	4	5
1	(The Bahamas) (Peru)	Roger Smith; Jaime Yzaga	6; 4	3; 6	7^{7} 6^{5}	5; 7	1; 6
2	(The Bahamas) (Peru)	Mark Knowles; Américo Venero	6; 4	6; 3	6; 1
3	(The Bahamas) (Peru)	Mark Knowles / Roger Smith; José Luis Noriega / Jaime Yzaga	6; 3	6; 3	7^{8} 6^{6}
4	(The Bahamas) (Peru)	Mark Knowles; Jaime Yzaga	2; 6	7; 5	7^{7} 6^{2}	6; 3
5	(The Bahamas) (Peru)	Roger Smith; Américo Venero	4; 6	4; 6

=== Chile vs. Brazil ===
Chile
2
Estadio Nacional, Santiago, Chile
9–11 February 1996
Clay

Brazil
3

			1	2	3	4	5
1	(Chile) (Brazil)	Sergio Cortés; Fernando Meligeni	1; 6	1; 6	5; 7
2	(Chile) (Brazil)	Marcelo Ríos; Jaime Oncins	6; 3	6; 2	7; 5
3	(Chile) (Brazil)	Marcelo Rebolledo / Marcelo Ríos; Gustavo Kuerten / Jaime Oncins	5; 7	3; 6	6; 4	2; 6
4	(Chile) (Brazil)	Marcelo Ríos; Fernando Meligeni	6; 2	7^{7} 6^{2}	6; 3
5	(Chile) (Brazil)	Sergio Cortés; Jaime Oncins	3; 6	4; 6	5; 7

=== Venezuela vs. Canada ===
Venezuela
3
Tennis Centre, Valencia, Venezuela
9–11 February 1996
Hard

Canada
2

			1	2	3	4	5
1	(Venezuela) (Canada)	Nicolás Pereira; Daniel Nestor	6; 4	3; 6	6; 3	2; 6	6; 4
2	(Venezuela) (Canada)	Jimy Szymanski; Sébastien Lareau	7^{7} 6^{4}	0; 6	6; 2	6; 4
3	(Venezuela) (Canada)	Juan Carlos Bianchi / Nicolás Pereira; Grant Connell / Sébastien Lareau	4; 6	4; 6	6^{4} 7^{7}
4	(Venezuela) (Canada)	Nicolás Pereira; Sébastien Lareau	7^{7} 6^{5}	3; 6	3; 6	3; 6
5	(Venezuela) (Canada)	Jimy Szymanski; Albert Chang	6; 3	5; 7	6; 3	6; 2

== Second round ==
=== Argentina vs. Bahamas ===
Argentina
4
Club Náutico, Mar del Plata, Argentina
5–7 April 1996
Clay

Bahamas
1

			1	2	3	4	5
1	(Argentina) (The Bahamas)	Javier Frana; Roger Smith	6; 3	6; 3	6; 4
2	(Argentina) (The Bahamas)	Hernán Gumy; Mark Knowles	6; 3	7^{7} 6^{3}	6; 1
3	(Argentina) (The Bahamas)	Javier Frana / Luis Lobo; Mark Knowles / Roger Smith	6; 4	3; 6	6; 2	6; 3
4	(Argentina) (The Bahamas)	Javier Frana; Mark Knowles	7^{9} 6^{7}	2; 6	3; 6
5	(Argentina) (The Bahamas)	Hernán Gumy; Roger Smith	6; 1	6; 1

=== Brazil vs. Venezuela ===
Brazil
4
Tênis Clube de Santos, Santos, Brazil
5–7 April 1996
Clay

Venezuela
1

			1	2	3	4	5
1	(Brazil) (Venezuela)	Gustavo Kuerten; Nicolás Pereira	6; 2	6^{2} 7^{7}	6; 1	6; 2
2	(Brazil) (Venezuela)	Fernando Meligeni; Jimy Szymanski	6; 3	7^{7} 6^{2}	6; 4
3	(Brazil) (Venezuela)	Jaime Oncins / Fernando Roese; Nicolás Pereira / Jimy Szymanski	6; 3	2; 6	4; 6	6; 3	3; 6
4	(Brazil) (Venezuela)	Fernando Meligeni; Nicolás Pereira	6; 4	6; 4	6; 3
5	(Brazil) (Venezuela)	Gustavo Kuerten; Jimy Szymanski	6; 2	6^{6} 7^{8}	6; 0

== First round relegation play-offs ==
=== Canada vs. Chile ===
Canada
3
Universiade Pavilion, Edmonton, Canada
5–7 April 1996
Carpet (indoors)

Chile
2

			1	2	3	4	5
1	(Canada) (Chile)	Daniel Nestor; Marcelo Ríos	4; 6	6^{6} 7^{8}	7^{7} 6^{5}	6; 3	12; 14
2	(Canada) (Chile)	Sébastien Lareau; Óscar Bustos	6; 4	6; 2	6; 3
3	(Canada) (Chile)	Grant Connell / Sébastien Lareau; Óscar Bustos / Marcelo Ríos	6; 3	6; 4	7; 5
4	(Canada) (Chile)	Sébastien Lareau; Nicolás Massú	6; 3	6; 1	6; 3
5	(Canada) (Chile)	Andrew Sznajder; Óscar Bustos	3; 6	3; 6

== Second round relegation play-offs ==
=== Chile vs. Peru ===
Chile
5
Estadio Nacional, Santiago, Chile
20–22 September 1996
Clay

Peru
0

			1	2	3	4	5
1	(Chile) (Peru)	Marcelo Ríos; Américo Venero	7; 5	6; 2	6; 4
2	(Chile) (Peru)	Gabriel Silberstein; Alejandro Aramburú	6; 0	6; 4	6; 3
3	(Chile) (Peru)	Óscar Bustos / Marcelo Ríos; Luis Horna / Américo Venero	6; 4	6; 3	6^{4} 7^{7}	3; 6	8; 6
4	(Chile) (Peru)	Marcelo Ríos; Alejandro Aramburú	6; 2	6; 3
5	(Chile) (Peru)	Gabriel Silberstein; Américo Venero	7; 5	6^{7} 7^{9}	6; 1
