= 1999 Davis Cup Americas Zone Group I =

International tennis competition

The Americas Zone was one of the three zones of the regional Davis Cup competition in 1999.

In the Americas Zone there were four different tiers, called groups, in which teams competed against each other to advance to the upper tier. Winners in Group I advanced to the World Group qualifying round, along with losing teams from the World Group first round. Teams who lost their respective ties competed in the relegation play-offs, with winning teams remaining in Group I, whereas teams who lost their play-offs were relegated to the Americas Zone Group II in 2000.

== Participating nations ==
- Argentina
- Bahamas
- Canada
- Chile
- Colombia
- Ecuador
- Venezuela

=== Draw ===
Second Round Play-offs
Caracas, Venezuela (hard)
Venezuela	1
Bahamas	3

First Round Play-offs
Caracas, Venezuela (hard)
Argentina	4
Venezuela	1
Nassau, Bahamas (hard)
Canada	4
Bahamas	1

First Round
Argentina
bye
Salinas, Ecuador (hard)
Venezuela	2
Ecuador	3
Cali, Colombia (clay)
Colombia	3
Canada	2
Nassau, Bahamas (hard)
Bahamas	0
Chile	5

Second Round
Salinas, Ecuador (hard)
Argentina	1
Ecuador	4
Bogotá, Colombia (clay)
Colombia	0
Chile	5

- Venezuela relegated to Group II in 2000.
- Ecuador and Chile advance to World Group qualifying round.

== First round ==
=== Ecuador vs. Venezuela ===
Ecuador
3
Salinas Golf y Tenis Club, Salinas, Ecuador
12–14 February 1999
Clay

Venezuela
2

			1	2	3	4	5
1	(Ecuador) (Venezuela)	Luis Morejón; Jimy Szymanski	6; 0	6; 1	4; 6	1; 6	1; 6
2	(Ecuador) (Venezuela)	Nicolás Lapentti; Kepler Orellana	6^{4} 7^{7}	6; 4	6; 3	6; 4
3	(Ecuador) (Venezuela)	Andrés Gómez / Nicolás Lapentti; Kepler Orellana / Jimy Szymanski	6; 4	6; 4	6; 4
4	(Ecuador) (Venezuela)	Nicolás Lapentti; Jimy Szymanski	6; 2	7^{7} 6^{5}	6; 1
5	(Ecuador) (Venezuela)	Juan Francisco Barragán; Yohny Romero	0; 6	3; 6

=== Colombia vs. Canada ===
Colombia
3
Liga Vallecaucana de Tenis, Cali, Colombia
12–14 February 1999
Clay

Canada
2

			1	2	3	4	5
1	(Colombia) (Canada)	Miguel Tobón; Daniel Nestor	7^{7} 6^{0}	6; 3	6; 1
2	(Colombia) (Canada)	Mauricio Hadad; Simon Larose	5; 7	3; 6	6; 4	6; 1	6; 4
3	(Colombia) (Canada)	Mauricio Hadad / Miguel Tobón; Daniel Nestor / Jocelyn Robichaud	6^{5} 7^{7}	7^{7} 6^{4}	7^{7} 6^{3}	0; 6	4; 6
4	(Colombia) (Canada)	Mauricio Hadad; Frédéric Niemeyer	6; 4	6; 4	7^{7} 6^{0}
5	(Colombia) (Canada)	Eduardo Rincón; Simon Larose	6; 4	1; 6	4; 6

=== Bahamas vs. Chile ===
Bahamas
0
National Lawn Tennis Centre, Nassau, Bahamas
12–14 February 1999
Hard

Chile
5

			1	2	3	4	5
1	(The Bahamas) (Chile)	Mark Knowles; Fernando González	5; 7	3; 6	6; 1	6; 4	3; 6
2	(The Bahamas) (Chile)	Mark Merklein; Nicolás Massú	2; 6	1; 6	2; 6
3	(The Bahamas) (Chile)	Mark Knowles / Roger Smith; Hermes Gamonal / Nicolás Massú	2; 6	3; 6	6^{0} 7^{7}
4	(The Bahamas) (Chile)	Roger Smith; Nicolás Massú	5; 7	6; 4	3; 6
5	(The Bahamas) (Chile)	John Farrington; Fernando González	4; 6	3; 6

== Second round ==
=== Ecuador vs. Argentina ===
Ecuador
4
Salinas Golf y Tenis Club, Salinas, Ecuador
2–4 April 1999
Hard

Argentina
1

			1	2	3	4	5
1	(Ecuador) (Argentina)	Luis Morejón; Mariano Puerta	4; 6	5; 7	4; 6
2	(Ecuador) (Argentina)	Nicolás Lapentti; Mariano Zabaleta	6; 3	7^{7} 6^{4}	5; 0			retired
3	(Ecuador) (Argentina)	Andrés Gómez / Nicolás Lapentti; Lucas Arnold Ker / Daniel Orsanic	6; 4	6; 3	7^{8} 6^{6}
4	(Ecuador) (Argentina)	Nicolás Lapentti; Mariano Puerta	6; 2	7^{7} 6^{4}	6; 1
5	(Ecuador) (Argentina)	Luis Morejón; Mariano Zabaleta	5; 2					retired

=== Colombia vs. Chile ===
Colombia
0
Club Campestre El Rancho, Bogotá, Colombia
2–4 April 1999
Clay

Chile
5

			1	2	3	4	5
1	(Colombia) (Chile)	Miguel Tobón; Marcelo Ríos	1; 6	6^{4} 7^{7}	1; 6
2	(Colombia) (Chile)	Mauricio Hadad; Nicolás Massú	6; 4	5; 7	6^{5} 7^{7}	1; 6
3	(Colombia) (Chile)	Mauricio Hadad / Miguel Tobón; Hermes Gamonal / Marcelo Ríos	4; 6	4; 6	6; 2	6; 1	4; 6
4	(Colombia) (Chile)	Eduardo Rincón; Marcelo Ríos	1; 6	6^{1} 7^{7}
5	(Colombia) (Chile)	Philippe Moggio; Nicolás Massú	4; 6	4; 6

== First round play-offs ==
=== Venezuela vs. Argentina ===
Venezuela
1
Centro Nacional de Tenis, Caracas, Venezuela
16–18 July 1999
Hard

Argentina
4

			1	2	3	4	5
1	(Venezuela) (Argentina)	Jimy Szymanski; Mariano Puerta	6^{5} 7^{7}	4; 6	7^{7} 6^{2}	7^{8} 6^{6}	4; 6
2	(Venezuela) (Argentina)	Maurice Ruah; Guillermo Cañas	3; 6	3; 6	7^{7} 6^{3}	6; 3	6; 3
3	(Venezuela) (Argentina)	Maurice Ruah / Jimy Szymanski; Mariano Hood / Sebastián Prieto	3; 6	4; 6	6^{6} 7^{8}
4	(Venezuela) (Argentina)	Maurice Ruah; Mariano Puerta	6^{7} 7^{9}	5; 7	6; 4	3; 6
5	(Venezuela) (Argentina)	Yohny Romero; Guillermo Cañas	5; 7	4; 6

=== Bahamas vs. Canada ===
Bahamas
1
National Lawn Tennis Centre, Nassau, Bahamas
16–18 July 1999
Hard

Canada
4

			1	2	3	4	5
1	(The Bahamas) (Canada)	Mark Knowles; Simon Larose	5; 7	3; 6	6; 1	2; 6
2	(The Bahamas) (Canada)	Mark Merklein; Sébastien Lareau	1; 6	2; 6	1; 6
3	(The Bahamas) (Canada)	Mark Knowles / Mark Merklein; Sébastien Lareau / Daniel Nestor	5; 7	3; 6	4; 6
4	(The Bahamas) (Canada)	Lavaughn Munroe; Frédéric Niemeyer	1; 6	3; 6
5	(The Bahamas) (Canada)	Mark Merklein; Simon Larose	6; 1	3; 6	6; 2

== Second round play-offs ==
=== Venezuela vs. Bahamas ===
Venezuela
1
Centro Nacional de Tenis, Caracas, Venezuela
24–26 September 1999
Hard

Bahamas
3

			1	2	3	4	5
1	(Venezuela) (The Bahamas)	Jimy Szymanski; Mark Knowles	5; 7	4; 6	6^{2} 7^{7}
2	(Venezuela) (The Bahamas)	Maurice Ruah; Mark Merklein	7; 5	5; 7	6^{5} 7^{7}	6; 3	6; 2
3	(Venezuela) (The Bahamas)	José de Armas / Maurice Ruah; Mark Knowles / Mark Merklein	3; 6	6; 2	3; 6	6; 4	3; 6
4	(Venezuela) (The Bahamas)	Maurice Ruah; Mark Knowles	6^{2} 7^{7}	6; 1	6; 0	5; 7	3; 6
5	(Venezuela) (The Bahamas)	Jimy Szymanski; Mark Merklein	6; 2	3; 2				not completed
