= 1971 Davis Cup Americas Zone =

International tennis competition

The Americas Zone was one of the three regional zones of the 1971 Davis Cup.

13 teams entered the Americas Zone: 5 teams competed in the North & Central America Zone, while 8 teams competed in the South America Zone. The winner of each sub-zone would play against each other to determine who moved to the Inter-Zonal Zone to compete against the winners of the Eastern Zone and Europe Zone.

Mexico defeated New Zealand in the North & Central America Zone final, and Brazil defeated Chile in the South America Zone final. In the Americas Inter-Zonal Final, Brazil defeated Mexico and progressed to the Inter-Zonal Zone.

== North & Central America Zone ==
=== Draw ===
Quarterfinals; 8–10 May
Mexico City, Mexico (clay)
Mexico	5
South Korea	0
Canada
bye
bye
Caribbean/West Indies
bye
New Zealand

Semifinals; 7–30 May
Mexico City, Mexico (clay)
Mexico	3
Canada	2
Kingston, Jamaica
Caribbean/West Indies	1
New Zealand	4

Final; 4–6 June
Mexico City, Mexico (clay)
Mexico	3
New Zealand	2

=== Quarterfinals ===
Mexico vs. South Korea

Mexico
5
Estadio Rafael Osuna, Mexico City, Mexico
8–10 May 1971
Clay

South Korea
0

			1	2	3	4	5
1	(Mexico) (South Korea)	Joaquín Loyo Mayo; Kim Doo-hwan	6; 1	6; 1	7; 5
2	(Mexico) (South Korea)	Marcello Lara; Chung Yong-ho	6; 4	6; 1	6; 1
3	(Mexico) (South Korea)	Raúl Ramírez / Vicente Zarazúa; Chung Yong-ho / Kim Sung-bae	6; 2	4; 6	6; 3	6; 1
4	(Mexico) (South Korea)	Joaquín Loyo Mayo; Chung Yong-ho	6; 0	6; 2	6; 2
5	(Mexico) (South Korea)	Marcello Lara; Kim Sung-bae	6; 2	6; 2	6; 2

=== Semifinals ===
Mexico vs. Canada

Mexico
3
Centro Deportivo Chapultepec, Mexico City, Mexico
28–30 May 1971
Clay

Canada
2

			1	2	3	4	5
1	(Mexico) (Canada)	Marcello Lara; John Sharpe	6; 3	6; 2	6; 2
2	(Mexico) (Canada)	Joaquín Loyo Mayo; Mike Belkin	6; 4	4; 6	2; 6	4; 6
3	(Mexico) (Canada)	Marcello Lara / Joaquín Loyo Mayo; John Sharpe / Mike Belkin	7; 5	3; 6	6; 1	6; 3
4	(Mexico) (Canada)	Marcello Lara; Mike Belkin	6; 4	4; 6	5; 7	2; 6
5	(Mexico) (Canada)	Joaquín Loyo Mayo; John Sharpe	4; 6	7; 5	6; 1	6; 1

Caribbean/West Indies vs. New Zealand

Caribbean/West Indies
1
Kingston, Jamaica
7–9 May 1971

New Zealand
4

			1	2	3	4	5
1	(Cricket West Indies) (New Zealand)	Leo Rolle; Onny Parun	2; 6	2; 6	0; 6
2	(Cricket West Indies) (New Zealand)	Richard Russell; Jeff Simpson	6; 2	6; 4	3; 6	8; 6
3	(Cricket West Indies) (New Zealand)	Compton Russell / Richard Russell; Onny Parun / Jeff Simpson	1; 6	1; 6	6; 4	4; 6
4	(Cricket West Indies) (New Zealand)	Leo Rolle; Jeff Simpson	5; 7	3; 6	0; 6
5	(Cricket West Indies) (New Zealand)	Richard Russell; Onny Parun	5; 7	2; 6	2; 6

=== Final ===
Mexico vs. New Zealand

Mexico
3
Estadio Rafael Osuna, Mexico City, Mexico
4–6 June 1971
Clay

New Zealand
2

			1	2	3	4	5
1	(Mexico) (New Zealand)	Joaquín Loyo Mayo; Onny Parun	9; 7	4; 6	1; 6	5; 7
2	(Mexico) (New Zealand)	Marcello Lara; Jeff Simpson	6; 3	6; 3	6; 1
3	(Mexico) (New Zealand)	Luis-Augusto García / Marcello Lara; Onny Parun / Jeff Simpson	3; 6	6; 2	12; 10	6; 3
4	(Mexico) (New Zealand)	Marcello Lara; Onny Parun	5; 7	3; 6	4; 6
5	(Mexico) (New Zealand)	Joaquín Loyo Mayo; Jeff Simpson	6; 3	6; 3	6; 2

== South America Zone ==
=== Draw ===
Quarterfinals; 19 March–6 April
Porto Alegre, Brazil
Brazil	5
Bolivia	0
Guayaquil, Ecuador (hard)
Ecuador	4
Venezuela	1
Montevideo, Uruguay (clay)
Uruguay	0
Argentina	5
Bogotá, Colombia
Colombia	2
Chile	3

Semifinals; 9–18 April
Porto Alegre, Brazil (clay)
Brazil	4
Ecuador	1
Santiago, Chile
Argentina	1
Chile	4

Final; 22–24 April
Santiago, Chile
Brazil	3
Chile	2

=== Quarterfinals ===
Brazil vs. Bolivia

Brazil
5
Porto Alegre, Brazil
4–6 April 1971

Bolivia
0

			1	2	3	4	5
1	(Brazil) (Bolivia)	José Edison Mandarino; Óscar Chiarella	6; 1	6; 3	6; 2
2	(Brazil) (Bolivia)	Thomaz Koch; Ramiro Benavides	6; 0	6; 1	6; 1
3	(Brazil) (Bolivia)	José Edison Mandarino / Luis Felipe Tavares; Ramiro Benavides / Óscar Chiarella	6; 2	6; 2	6; 0
4	(Brazil) (Bolivia)	José Edison Mandarino; Ramiro Benavides	6; 0	6; 2	6; 3
5	(Brazil) (Bolivia)	Thomaz Koch; Óscar Chiarella	6; 1	6; 0	6; 1

Ecuador vs. Venezuela

Ecuador
4
Guayaquil Tenis Club, Guayaquil, Ecuador
26–28 March 1971
Hard

Venezuela
1

			1	2	3	4	5
1	(Ecuador) (Venezuela)	Miguel Olvera; Humphrey Hose	6; 2	6; 4	6; 3
2	(Ecuador) (Venezuela)	Pancho Guzmán; Jorge Andrew	6; 1	6; 3	6; 0
3	(Ecuador) (Venezuela)	Pancho Guzmán / Miguel Olvera; Jorge Andrew / Humphrey Hose	6; 3	6; 4	6; 1
4	(Ecuador) (Venezuela)	Pancho Guzmán; Humphrey Hose	8; 6	4; 6	5; 7	4; 6
5	(Ecuador) (Venezuela)	Miguel Olvera; Jorge Andrew	6; 2	6; 0	6; 3

Uruguay vs. Argentina

Uruguay
0
Montevideo, Uruguay
20–22 March 1971
Clay

Argentina
5

			1	2	3	4	5
1	(Uruguay) (Argentina)	Fabian Barriola; Julián Ganzábal	1; 6	2; 6	0; 6
2	(Uruguay) (Argentina)	Gustavo Stapf; Guillermo Vilas	0; 6	4; 6	0; 6
3	(Uruguay) (Argentina)	Fabian Barriola / Enrique Pérez Álvarez; Ricardo Cano / Guillermo Vilas	2; 6	4; 6	4; 6
4	(Uruguay) (Argentina)	Mario Laborde; Jason Van Kerckhoven	1; 6	2; 6	1; 6
5	(Uruguay) (Argentina)	Gustavo Stapf; Ricardo Cano	0; 6	2; 6	2; 6

Colombia vs. Chile

Colombia
2
Bogotá, Colombia
19–21 March 1971

Chile
3

			1	2	3	4	5
1	(Colombia) (Chile)	Iván Molina; Jaime Fillol	4; 6	3; 6	7; 5	3; 6
2	(Colombia) (Chile)	Jairo Velasco; Patricio Cornejo	6; 8	1; 6	6; 4	8; 6	6; 1
3	(Colombia) (Chile)	Iván Molina / Jairo Velasco; Patricio Cornejo / Jaime Fillol	5; 7	5; 7	6; 4	3; 6
4	(Colombia) (Chile)	Jairo Velasco; Jaime Fillol	8; 6	6; 2	6; 3
5	(Colombia) (Chile)	Iván Molina; Patricio Cornejo	3; 6	4; 6	2; 6

=== Semifinals ===
Brazil vs. Ecuador

Brazil
4
Porto Alegre, Brazil
16–18 April 1971
Clay

Ecuador
1

			1	2	3	4	5
1	(Brazil) (Ecuador)	Thomaz Koch; Miguel Olvera	6; 3	3; 6	6; 4	6; 1
2	(Brazil) (Ecuador)	José Edison Mandarino; Pancho Guzmán	6; 4	4; 6	6; 3	6; 2
3	(Brazil) (Ecuador)	Thomaz Koch / José Edison Mandarino; Pancho Guzmán / Miguel Olvera	6; 4	6; 1	6; 1
4	(Brazil) (Ecuador)	Thomaz Koch; Pancho Guzmán	6; 4	6; 4	5; 7	6; 2
5	(Brazil) (Ecuador)	José Edison Mandarino; Miguel Olvera	1; 6	6; 2	6; 3	3; 6	0; 6

Chile vs. Argentina

Chile
4
Santiago, Chile
9–11 April 1971

Argentina
1

			1	2	3	4	5
1	(Chile) (Argentina)	Jaime Fillol; Tomás Miguel Lynch	6; 2	6; 4	6; 2
2	(Chile) (Argentina)	Patricio Cornejo; Julián Ganzábal	6; 4	6; 4	6; 4
3	(Chile) (Argentina)	Patricio Cornejo / Jaime Fillol; Ricardo Cano / Julián Ganzábal	6; 2	6; 3	6; 4
4	(Chile) (Argentina)	Patricio Cornejo; Tomás Miguel Lynch	6; 3	6; 3	6; 4
5	(Chile) (Argentina)	Jaime Fillol; Julián Ganzábal	3; 6	6; 2	6; 8	4; 6

=== Final ===
Chile vs. Brazil

Chile
2
Santiago, Chile
22–24 April 1971

Brazil
3

			1	2	3	4	5
1	(Chile) (Brazil)	Patricio Cornejo; Thomaz Koch	6; 4	2; 6	7; 5	6; 8	2; 6
2	(Chile) (Brazil)	Jaime Fillol; José Edison Mandarino	6; 1	8; 6	4; 6	10; 8
3	(Chile) (Brazil)	Patricio Cornejo / Jaime Fillol; Thomaz Koch / José Edison Mandarino	6; 3	6; 2	2; 6	2; 6	6; 8
4	(Chile) (Brazil)	Jaime Fillol; Thomaz Koch	3; 6	2; 6	2; 6
5	(Chile) (Brazil)	Patricio Cornejo; José Edison Mandarino	4; 6	1; 6	6; 0	6; 3	6; 4

== Americas Inter-Zonal Final ==
Mexico vs. Brazil

Mexico
2
Estadio Rafael Osuna, Mexico City, Mexico
17–19 July 1971
Clay

Brazil
3

			1	2	3	4	5
1	(Mexico) (Brazil)	Marcello Lara; Thomaz Koch	4; 6	2; 6	1; 6
2	(Mexico) (Brazil)	Joaquín Loyo Mayo; José Edison Mandarino	6; 4	3; 6	4; 6	7; 5	6; 1
3	(Mexico) (Brazil)	Joaquín Loyo Mayo / Vicente Zarazúa; Thomaz Koch / José Edison Mandarino	8; 6	7; 5	6; 2
4	(Mexico) (Brazil)	Marcello Lara; José Edison Mandarino	4; 6	3; 6	7; 9
5	(Mexico) (Brazil)	Joaquín Loyo Mayo; Thomaz Koch	5; 7	6; 4	9; 7	4; 6	7; 9
