= 1997 Davis Cup Americas Zone Group I =

International tennis competition

The Americas Zone was one of the three zones of the regional Davis Cup competition in 1997.

In the Americas Zone there were four different tiers, called groups, in which teams competed against each other to advance to the upper tier. Winners in Group I advanced to the World Group qualifying round, along with losing teams from the World Group first round. Teams who lost their respective ties competed in the relegation play-offs, with winning teams remaining in Group I, whereas teams who lost their play-offs were relegated to the Americas Zone Group II in 1998.

== Participating nations ==
- Argentina
- Bahamas
- Canada
- Chile
- Ecuador
- Venezuela

=== Draw ===
Second Round Play-offs
Buenos Aires, Argentina (clay)
Venezuela	1
Argentina	4

First Round Play-offs
Nassau, Bahamas (hard)
Venezuela	2
Bahamas	3
Buenos Aires, Argentina (clay)
Ecuador	3
Argentina	1

First Round
Venezuela
bye
Montreal, Canada (indoor hard)
Bahamas	1
Canada	4
Santiago, Chile (clay)
Chile	4
Ecuador	1
bye
Argentina

Second Round
Montreal, Canada (indoor hard)
Venezuela	0
Canada	5
Santiago, Chile (clay)
Chile	3
Argentina	2

- Venezuela relegated to Group II in 1998.
- Canada and Chile advance to World Group qualifying round.

== First round ==
=== Canada vs. Bahamas ===
Canada
4
Jarry Park Stadium, Montreal, Canada
7–9 February 1997
Hard (indoors)

Bahamas
1

			1	2	3	4	5
1	(Canada) (The Bahamas)	Daniel Nestor; Roger Smith	6; 1	6; 1	6; 2
2	(Canada) (The Bahamas)	Sébastien Lareau; Mark Knowles	4; 6	6; 3	2; 6	7; 5	1; 6
3	(Canada) (The Bahamas)	Grant Connell / Sébastien Lareau; Mark Knowles / Roger Smith	6; 2	6^{1} 7^{7}	6; 4	6; 4
4	(Canada) (The Bahamas)	Daniel Nestor; Mark Knowles	3; 6	7; 5	6; 4	6; 2
5	(Canada) (The Bahamas)	Sébastien Lareau; Roger Smith	6; 2	4; 6	6; 2

=== Chile vs. Ecuador ===
Chile
4
Estadio Nacional, Santiago, Chile
7–9 February 1997
Clay

Ecuador
1

			1	2	3	4	5
1	(Chile) (Ecuador)	Gabriel Silberstein; Nicolás Lapentti	6; 2	4; 6	1; 6	6; 3	6; 3
2	(Chile) (Ecuador)	Marcelo Ríos; Luis Morejón	6; 1	6; 3	3; 6	6; 2
3	(Chile) (Ecuador)	Óscar Bustos / Marcelo Ríos; Pablo Campana / Nicolás Lapentti	6; 4	4; 6	0; 6	3; 6
4	(Chile) (Ecuador)	Marcelo Ríos; Nicolás Lapentti	7; 5	6^{6} 7^{8}	6; 3	6^{6} 7^{8}	8; 6
5	(Chile) (Ecuador)	Gabriel Silberstein; Luis Morejón	7^{7} 6^{4}	6; 2

== Second round ==
=== Canada vs. Venezuela ===
Canada
5
Jarry Park Stadium, Montreal, Canada
4–6 April 1997
Hard (indoors)

Venezuela
0

			1	2	3	4	5
1	(Canada) (Venezuela)	Sébastien Lareau; José de Armas	6; 1	6; 3	6; 2
2	(Canada) (Venezuela)	Daniel Nestor; Jimy Szymanski	6; 2	7^{7} 6^{5}	6; 1
3	(Canada) (Venezuela)	Grant Connell / Sébastien Lareau; Shuon Madden / Jimy Szymanski	6; 2	6; 1	6; 3
4	(Canada) (Venezuela)	Sébastien Lareau; Jimy Szymanski	6; 3	7; 5
5	(Canada) (Venezuela)	Sébastien Leblanc; José de Armas	2; 6	7^{7} 6^{2}	6; 0

=== Chile vs. Argentina ===
Chile
3
Estadio Nacional, Santiago, Chile
4–6 April 1997
Clay

Argentina
2

			1	2	3	4	5
1	(Chile) (Argentina)	Marcelo Ríos; Javier Frana	6; 1	6; 4	7^{7} 6^{2}
2	(Chile) (Argentina)	Gabriel Silberstein; Hernán Gumy	0; 6	4; 6	4; 6
3	(Chile) (Argentina)	Marcelo Ríos / Gabriel Silberstein; Javier Frana / Luis Lobo	3; 6	7^{10} 6^{8}	4; 6	6; 3	6; 2
4	(Chile) (Argentina)	Marcelo Ríos; Hernán Gumy	6; 4	7; 5	6; 4
5	(Chile) (Argentina)	Gabriel Silberstein; Javier Frana	4; 6	4; 6

== First round relegation play-offs ==
=== Bahamas vs. Venezuela ===
Bahamas
3
Beach Hotel, Nassau, Bahamas
11–13 July 1997
Hard

Venezuela
2

			1	2	3	4	5
1	(The Bahamas) (Venezuela)	Roger Smith; Nicolás Pereira	7^{7} 6^{4}	6; 3	6; 4
2	(The Bahamas) (Venezuela)	Mark Knowles; Jimy Szymanski	3; 6	6^{4} 7^{7}	2; 6
3	(The Bahamas) (Venezuela)	Mark Knowles / Roger Smith; Nicolás Pereira / Jimy Szymanski	6; 3	6^{4} 7^{7}	7^{7} 6^{5}	7; 5
4	(The Bahamas) (Venezuela)	Mark Knowles; Nicolás Pereira	7; 5	5; 7	1; 6	5; 7
5	(The Bahamas) (Venezuela)	Roger Smith; Jimy Szymanski	3; 6	1; 6	7^{7} 6^{4}	6; 4	6; 4

=== Argentina vs. Ecuador ===
Argentina
1
Buenos Aires Lawn Tennis Club, Buenos Aires, Argentina
11–14 July 1997
Clay

Ecuador
3

			1	2	3	4	5
1	(Argentina) (Ecuador)	Hernán Gumy; Luis Morejón	1; 6	4; 6	7; 5	5; 7
2	(Argentina) (Ecuador)	Marcelo Charpentier; Nicolás Lapentti	3; 6	4; 6	3; 6
3	(Argentina) (Ecuador)	Pablo Albano / Luis Lobo; Giorgio Carneade / Nicolás Lapentti	6; 2	6; 1	7^{7} 6^{4}
4	(Argentina) (Ecuador)	Hernán Gumy; Nicolás Lapentti	4; 6	4; 6	6; 3	6; 0	3; 6
5	(Argentina) (Ecuador)	Marcelo Charpentier; Luis Morejón						not played

== Second round relegation play-offs ==
=== Argentina vs. Venezuela ===
Argentina
4
Buenos Aires Lawn Tennis Club, Buenos Aires, Argentina
19–21 September 1997
Clay

Venezuela
1

			1	2	3	4	5
1	(Argentina) (Venezuela)	Hernán Gumy; José de Armas	6; 0	6; 2	6; 1
2	(Argentina) (Venezuela)	Lucas Arnold Ker; Jimy Szymanski	6; 4	6; 3	7; 5
3	(Argentina) (Venezuela)	Pablo Albano / Luis Lobo; José de Armas / Jimy Szymanski	6; 1	6; 0	6; 3
4	(Argentina) (Venezuela)	Luis Lobo; Jimy Szymanski	2; 6	2; 6
5	(Argentina) (Venezuela)	Lucas Arnold Ker; José de Armas	6; 1	6; 2
