= 2001 Davis Cup Americas Zone Group I =

International tennis competition

The Americas Zone was one of the three zones of the regional Davis Cup competition in 2001.

In the Americas Zone there were four different tiers, called groups, in which teams competed against each other to advance to the upper tier. Winners in Group I advanced to the World Group qualifying round, along with losing teams from the World Group first round. Teams who lost their respective ties competed in the relegation play-offs, with winning teams remaining in Group I, whereas teams who lost their play-offs were relegated to the Americas Zone Group II in 2002.

== Participating nations ==
- Argentina
- Bahamas
- Canada
- Chile
- Mexico
- Peru

=== Draw ===
Second round play-offs 21–23 September
Atizapán de Zaragoza, MX (indoor carpet)
Mexico	3
Peru	2

First round play-offs 20–22 July
Mexico City, Mexico (clay)
Canada	3
Mexico	2
Peru
bye

First round 9–11 February
Canada
bye
Mendoza, Argentina (clay)
Mexico	0
Argentina	5
Nassau, Bahamas (hard)
Bahamas	3
Peru	2
bye
Chile

Second round 6–8 April
Córdoba, Argentina (clay)
Canada	0
Argentina	5
Nassau, Bahamas (hard)
Bahamas	1
Chile	4

- Peru relegated to Group II in 2002.
- Argentina and Chile advance to World Group qualifying round.

== First round ==
=== Argentina vs. Mexico ===
Argentina
5
Mendoza Tennis Club, Mendoza, Argentina
9–11 February 2001
Clay

Mexico
0

			1	2	3	4	5
1	(Argentina) (Mexico)	Franco Squillari; Óscar Ortiz	6; 1	6; 4	6; 0
2	(Argentina) (Mexico)	Gastón Gaudio; Bruno Echagaray	6; 0	6; 3	6; 0
3	(Argentina) (Mexico)	Agustín Calleri / Martín García; Bruno Echagaray / Santiago González	6; 3	7; 5	6; 1
4	(Argentina) (Mexico)	Franco Squillari; Marcello Amador	6; 1	6; 0
5	(Argentina) (Mexico)	Gastón Gaudio; Óscar Ortiz	6; 3	6; 0

=== Bahamas vs. Peru ===
Bahamas
3
Queen Elizabeth Sports Centre, Nassau, Bahamas
9–11 February 2001
Hard

Peru
2

			1	2	3	4	5
1	(The Bahamas) (Peru)	Mark Knowles; Mario Monroy	7; 5	6; 2	6; 3
2	(The Bahamas) (Peru)	Mark Merklein; Iván Miranda	2; 6	6; 4	2; 6	7^{7} 6^{2}	7; 9
3	(The Bahamas) (Peru)	Mark Knowles / Mark Merklein; Patrick Boza / Iván Miranda	5; 7	6; 1	6; 2	6; 2
4	(The Bahamas) (Peru)	Mark Knowles; Iván Miranda	6^{3} 7^{7}	6; 1	3; 6	2; 6
5	(The Bahamas) (Peru)	Mark Merklein; Patrick Boza	6; 4	6; 2	6; 4

== Second round ==
=== Argentina vs. Canada ===
Argentina
5
Córdoba Lawn Tennis Club, Córdoba, Argentina
6–8 April 2001
Clay

Canada
0

			1	2	3	4	5
1	(Argentina) (Canada)	Gastón Gaudio; Sébastien Lareau	6; 0	6; 1	6; 1
2	(Argentina) (Canada)	Franco Squillari; Frédéric Niemeyer	6; 4	6; 4	6; 3
3	(Argentina) (Canada)	Agustín Calleri / Mariano Puerta; Frédéric Niemeyer / Jocelyn Robichaud	7^{7} 6^{5}	6; 3	6; 4
4	(Argentina) (Canada)	Mariano Puerta; Simon Larose	7; 5	6; 4
5	(Argentina) (Canada)	Agustín Calleri; Frédéric Niemeyer	6; 2	6; 4

=== Bahamas vs. Chile ===
Bahamas
1
Queen Elizabeth Sports Centre, Nassau, Bahamas
6–8 April 2001
Hard

Chile
4

			1	2	3	4	5
1	(The Bahamas) (Chile)	Mark Merklein; Marcelo Ríos	0; 6	2; 6	5; 7
2	(The Bahamas) (Chile)	Mark Knowles; Nicolás Massú	4; 6	4; 6	6; 3	1; 6
3	(The Bahamas) (Chile)	Mark Knowles / Mark Merklein; Fernando González / Nicolás Massú	2; 6	6; 3	6; 4	3; 6	6; 3
4	(The Bahamas) (Chile)	Mark Knowles; Marcelo Ríos	3; 6	4; 6	4; 6
5	(The Bahamas) (Chile)	Marvin Rolle; Adrián García	4; 6	2; 6

== First round play-offs ==
=== Mexico vs. Canada ===
Mexico
2
Chapultepec Sports Club, Mexico City, Mexico
20–22 July 2001
Clay

Canada
3

			1	2	3	4	5
1	(Mexico) (Canada)	Miguel Gallardo Valles; Simon Larose	6; 2	3; 6	4; 6	4; 6
2	(Mexico) (Canada)	Alejandro Hernández; Frédéric Niemeyer	1; 6	6; 2	4; 6	6; 4	6; 3
3	(Mexico) (Canada)	Enrique Abaroa / Óscar Ortiz; Frédéric Niemeyer / Jerry Turek	3; 6	2; 6	6^{4} 7^{7}
4	(Mexico) (Canada)	Alejandro Hernández; Simon Larose	6^{5} 7^{7}	3; 6	6; 2	6; 3	6; 0
5	(Mexico) (Canada)	Miguel Gallardo Valles; Frédéric Niemeyer	2; 6	4; 6	6; 0	6^{2} 7^{7}

== Second round play-offs ==
=== Mexico vs. Peru ===
Mexico
3
Monterrey Technology College, Atizapán de Zaragoza, Mexico
21–23 September 2001
Carpet (indoors)

Peru
2

			1	2	3	4	5
1	(Mexico) (Peru)	Miguel Gallardo Valles; Luis Horna	6^{4} 7^{7}	6; 4	6; 2	1; 6	0; 6
2	(Mexico) (Peru)	Alejandro Hernández; Iván Miranda	6; 4	6; 4	6; 3
3	(Mexico) (Peru)	Santiago González / Alejandro Hernández; Luis Horna / Iván Miranda	5; 7	4; 6	7^{7} 6^{3}	6; 1	6; 3
4	(Mexico) (Peru)	Alejandro Hernández; Luis Horna	1; 6	6; 3	7^{8} 6^{6}	6; 3
5	(Mexico) (Peru)	Bruno Echagaray; Iván Miranda	5; 7	3; 6
