= 1986 Davis Cup Americas Zone =

International tennis competition

The Americas Zone was one of the three regional zones of the 1986 Davis Cup.

9 teams entered the Americas Zone in total, with the winner promoted to the following year's World Group. Argentina defeated Chile in the final and qualified for the 1987 World Group.

== Participating nations ==
- Argentina
- Brazil
- Canada
- Caribbean/West Indies
- Chile
- Colombia
- Peru
- Uruguay
- Venezuela

=== Draw ===
First round 17–19 January
Chile
bye
bye
Canada
Brazil
bye
bye
Caribbean/West Indies
Colombia
bye
bye
Peru
Caracas, Venezuela (hard)
Uruguay	3
Venezuela	2
bye
Argentina

Quarterfinals; 7–9 March
Santiago, Chile (clay)
Chile	3
Canada	2
Kingston, Jamaica (hard)
Brazil	5
Caribbean/West Indies	0
Bogotá, Colombia (indoor clay)
Colombia	0
Peru	4
Buenos Aires, Argentina (clay)
Uruguay	0
Argentina	5

Semifinals; 18–20 July
São Paulo, Brazil (clay)
Chile	5
Brazil	0
Buenos Aires, Argentina (clay)
Peru	2
Argentina	3

Final; 3–5 October
Santiago, Chile (clay)
Chile	1
Argentina	4

== First round ==
=== Venezuela vs. Uruguay ===
Venezuela
2
National Tennis Centre, Caracas, Venezuela
17–19 January 1986
Hard

Uruguay
3

			1	2	3	4	5
1	(Venezuela) (Uruguay)	Carlos Claverie; Diego Pérez	12; 10	6; 8	3; 6	6; 3	3; 6
2	(Venezuela) (Uruguay)	Iñaki Calvo; Victor Caldarelli	6; 4	6; 3	6; 4
3	(Venezuela) (Uruguay)	Iñaki Calvo / Alfonso Mora; Victor Caldarelli / Diego Pérez	6; 4	7; 9	6; 4	6; 4
4	(Venezuela) (Uruguay)	Iñaki Calvo; Diego Pérez	3; 6	1; 6	7; 9
5	(Venezuela) (Uruguay)	Carlos Claverie; Victor Caldarelli	6; 8	4; 6	4; 6

== Quarterfinals ==
=== Chile vs. Canada ===
Chile
3
Santiago, Chile
7–9 March 1986
Clay

Canada
2

			1	2	3	4	5
1	(Chile) (Canada)	Hans Gildemeister; Martin Wostenholme	6; 1	6; 3	6; 1
2	(Chile) (Canada)	Ricardo Acuña; Glenn Michibata	3; 6	3; 6	6; 4	6; 8
3	(Chile) (Canada)	Ricardo Acuña / Hans Gildemeister; Mark Greenan / Glenn Michibata	6; 4	3; 6	6; 4	4; 6	6; 1
4	(Chile) (Canada)	Ricardo Acuña; Martin Wostenholme	4; 6	6; 0	2; 6	4; 6
5	(Chile) (Canada)	Hans Gildemeister; Glenn Michibata	9; 7	3; 6	8; 6	6; 4

=== Caribbean/West Indies vs. Brazil ===
Caribbean/West Indies
0
Kingston, Jamaica
7–9 March 1986
Hard

Brazil
5

			1	2	3	4	5
1	(Cricket West Indies) (Brazil)	Karl Hale; Nelson Aerts	3; 6	0; 6	2; 6
2	(Cricket West Indies) (Brazil)	Roger Smith; Cássio Motta	6; 8	6; 4	1; 6	3; 6
3	(Cricket West Indies) (Brazil)	Karl Hale / Roger Smith; Nelson Aerts / Cássio Motta	3; 6	10; 8	8; 10	7; 9
4	(Cricket West Indies) (Brazil)	John Maginley; Luiz Mattar	2; 6	3; 6
5	(Cricket West Indies) (Brazil)	Roger Smith; Nelson Aerts	1; 6	6; 3	6^{4} 7^{7}

=== Colombia vs. Peru ===
Colombia
0
América Tenis Club, Bogotá, Colombia
7–9 March 1986
Clay (indoors)

Peru
4

			1	2	3	4	5
1	(Colombia) (Peru)	Orlando Agudelo; Pablo Arraya	4; 6	1; 6	6; 2	3; 6
2	(Colombia) (Peru)	Luis Arturo González; Jaime Yzaga	2; 6	6; 3	1; 6	3; 6
3	(Colombia) (Peru)	Orlando Agudelo / Luis Arturo González; Carlos di Laura / Jaime Yzaga	1; 6	0; 6	1; 6
4	(Colombia) (Peru)	Luis Arturo González; Pablo Arraya						not played
5	(Colombia) (Peru)	Orlando Agudelo; Jaime Yzaga	6; 3	6; 8	3; 6

=== Argentina vs. Uruguay ===
Argentina
5
Buenos Aires Lawn Tennis Club, Buenos Aires, Argentina
7–9 March 1986
Clay

Uruguay
0

			1	2	3	4	5
1	(Argentina) (Uruguay)	Horacio de la Peña; Diego Pérez	4; 6	6; 0	6; 2	2; 6	6; 3
2	(Argentina) (Uruguay)	Martín Jaite; Marcelo Filippini	6; 4	6; 4	6; 2
3	(Argentina) (Uruguay)	Eduardo Bengoechea / Roberto Saad; José Luis Damiani / Diego Pérez	9; 7	9; 7	6; 3
4	(Argentina) (Uruguay)	Martín Jaite; Diego Pérez	4; 4					retired
5	(Argentina) (Uruguay)	Horacio de la Peña; Marcelo Filippini	6; 0	6; 3

== Semifinals ==
=== Brazil vs. Chile ===
Brazil
0
São Paulo, Brazil
18–20 July 1986
Clay

Chile
5

			1	2	3	4	5
1	(Brazil) (Chile)	Luiz Mattar; Hans Gildemeister	6; 3	9; 7	3; 6	4; 6	4; 6
2	(Brazil) (Chile)	Cássio Motta; Pedro Rebolledo	6; 1	3; 6	4; 6	4; 6
3	(Brazil) (Chile)	Carlos Kirmayr / Cássio Motta; Ricardo Acuña / Hans Gildemeister	6; 2	4; 6	4; 6	4; 6
4	(Brazil) (Chile)	Luiz Mattar; Pedro Rebolledo	6; 3	1; 6	4; 6
5	(Brazil) (Chile)	Nelson Aerts; Gerardo Vacarezza	1; 6	4; 6

=== Argentina vs. Peru ===
Argentina
3
Buenos Aires Lawn Tennis Club, Buenos Aires, Argentina
18–20 July 1986
Clay

Peru
2

			1	2	3	4	5
1	(Argentina) (Peru)	Horacio de la Peña; Jaime Yzaga	6; 4	12; 10	6; 4
2	(Argentina) (Peru)	Martín Jaite; Pablo Arraya	5; 7	4; 6	2; 6
3	(Argentina) (Peru)	Eduardo Bengoechea / Christian Miniussi; Carlos di Laura / Jaime Yzaga	6; 3	6; 8	6; 4	6; 4
4	(Argentina) (Peru)	Martín Jaite; Jaime Yzaga	4; 6	6; 0	3; 6	8; 6	6; 2
5	(Argentina) (Peru)	Horacio de la Peña; Pablo Arraya	7; 5	3; 6	4; 6

== Final ==
=== Chile vs. Argentina ===
Chile
1
Santiago, Chile
3–5 October 1986
Clay

Argentina
4

			1	2	3	4	5
1	(Chile) (Argentina)	Hans Gildemeister; Horacio de la Peña	3; 6	9; 7	2; 6	8; 10
2	(Chile) (Argentina)	Pedro Rebolledo; Martín Jaite	2; 6	3; 6	2; 6
3	(Chile) (Argentina)	Ricardo Acuña / Hans Gildemeister; Javier Frana / Christian Miniussi	6; 2	3; 6	6; 3	3; 6	9; 7
4	(Chile) (Argentina)	Hans Gildemeister; Martín Jaite	2; 6	2; 6	1; 6
5	(Chile) (Argentina)	Ricardo Acuña; Horacio de la Peña	4; 6	3; 6
