= 1988 Davis Cup Americas Zone =

International tennis competition

The Americas Zone was one of the three zones of the regional Davis Cup competition in 1988.

In the Americas Zone there were two different tiers, called groups, in which teams competed against each other to advance to the upper tier.

== Group I ==
The winner of Group I was promoted to the following year's World Group. Teams who lost their respective first-round ties competed in the relegation play-off, with the winning team remaining in Group I, whereas the losing team was relegated to the Americas Zone Group II in 1989.

=== Participating nations ===
- Argentina
- Canada
- Chile
- Ecuador
- Peru
- United States

==== Draw ====
First Round; 4–7 February
Argentina
bye
Guayaquil, Ecuador (clay)
Ecuador	5
Canada	0
Viña del Mar, Chile (clay)
Peru	4
Chile	1
bye
United States

Second Round; 8–10 April
Guayaquil, Ecuador (clay)
Argentina	4
Ecuador	1
Lima, Peru (clay)
Peru	0
United States	3

Third Round; 22–24 July
Buenos Aires, Argentina (clay)
Argentina	1
United States	4

- United States are promoted to the World Group in 1989.

Relegation Play-off; 8–10 April
Vancouver, Canada (indoor carpet)
Canada	4
Chile	1

- Chile are relegated to Group II in 1989.

=== First round ===
==== Ecuador vs. Canada ====
Ecuador
5
Guayaquil Tenis Club, Guayaquil, Ecuador
5–7 February 1988
Clay

Canada
0

			1	2	3	4	5
1	(Ecuador) (Canada)	Andrés Gómez; Chris Pridham	7; 5	6; 1	6; 4
2	(Ecuador) (Canada)	Raúl Viver; Martin Wostenholme	0; 6	8; 6	6; 2	3; 6	6; 4
3	(Ecuador) (Canada)	Andrés Gómez / Hugo Núñez; Grant Connell / Glenn Michibata	6; 2	6; 4	7; 9	14; 12
4	(Ecuador) (Canada)	Raúl Viver; Chris Pridham						w/o
5	(Ecuador) (Canada)	Ernesto Lingen; Martin Wostenholme	7; 5	3; 6	6; 1

==== Chile vs. Peru ====
Chile
1
Viña del Mar, Chile
4–6 February 1988
Clay

Peru
4

			1	2	3	4	5
1	(Chile) (Peru)	Juan Pablo Queirolo; Pablo Arraya	4; 6	2; 6	6; 1	1; 6
2	(Chile) (Peru)	Pedro Rebolledo; Jaime Yzaga	8; 6	1; 6	2; 6	3; 6
3	(Chile) (Peru)	Ricardo Acuña / Hans Gildemeister; Carlos di Laura / Jaime Yzaga	6; 4	6; 2	6; 4
4	(Chile) (Peru)	Pedro Rebolledo; Pablo Arraya	5; 7	3; 6	6; 3	2; 6
5	(Chile) (Peru)	Juan Pablo Queirolo; Jaime Yzaga	7; 9	2; 6

=== Second round ===
==== Ecuador vs. Argentina ====
Ecuador
1
Guayaquil Tenis Club, Guayaquil, Ecuador
8–10 April 1988
Clay

Argentina
4

			1	2	3	4	5
1	(Ecuador) (Argentina)	Andrés Gómez; Martín Jaite	6; 4	2; 6	7; 5	2; 6	4; 6
2	(Ecuador) (Argentina)	Raúl Viver; Guillermo Pérez Roldán	3; 6	1; 6	1; 6
3	(Ecuador) (Argentina)	Andrés Gómez / Hugo Núñez; Javier Frana / Christian Miniussi	3; 6	6; 4	6; 3	4; 6	3; 6
4	(Ecuador) (Argentina)	Andrés Gómez; Guillermo Pérez Roldán	2; 6	6; 2	6; 0
5	(Ecuador) (Argentina)	Hugo Núñez; Javier Frana	3; 6	3; 6

==== Peru vs. United States ====
Peru
0
Club Lawn Tennis de la Exposición, Lima, Peru
8–10 April 1988
Clay

United States
3

			1	2	3	4	5
1	(Peru) (United States)	Pablo Arraya; Jay Berger	5; 7	1; 6	7; 5	6; 1	5; 7
2	(Peru) (United States)	Jaime Yzaga; Andre Agassi	8; 6	5; 7	1; 6	2; 6
3	(Peru) (United States)	Carlos di Laura / Jaime Yzaga; Ken Flach / Robert Seguso	2; 6	6; 4	4; 6	3; 6
4	(Peru) (United States)	Jaime Yzaga; Jay Berger						not played
5	(Peru) (United States)	Pablo Arraya; Andre Agassi						not played

=== Relegation play-offs ===
==== Canada vs. Chile ====
Canada
4
Vancouver, Canada
8–10 April 1988
Carpet (indoors)

Chile
1

			1	2	3	4	5
1	(Canada) (Chile)	Chris Pridham; Ricardo Acuña	6; 8	6; 1	6; 2	6; 4
2	(Canada) (Chile)	Andrew Sznajder; Juan Pablo Queirolo	6; 2	6; 4	6; 1
3	(Canada) (Chile)	Grant Connell / Glenn Michibata; Ricardo Acuña / Cristián Araya	6; 3	6; 3	8; 6
4	(Canada) (Chile)	Andrew Sznajder; Ricardo Acuña	5; 7	1; 6
5	(Canada) (Chile)	Chris Pridham; Juan Pablo Queirolo	6; 1	8; 6

=== Third round ===
==== Argentina vs. United States ====
Argentina
1
Buenos Aires Lawn Tennis Club, Buenos Aires, Argentina
22–24 July 1988
Clay

United States
4

			1	2	3	4	5
1	(Argentina) (United States)	Guillermo Pérez Roldán; John McEnroe	2; 6	7; 5	4; 6	6; 3	3; 6
2	(Argentina) (United States)	Martín Jaite; Andre Agassi	2; 6	2; 6	1; 6
3	(Argentina) (United States)	Javier Frana / Christian Miniussi; Ken Flach / Robert Seguso	2; 6	3; 6	4; 6
4	(Argentina) (United States)	Guillermo Pérez Roldán; Andre Agassi	6; 2	2; 6	6; 8
5	(Argentina) (United States)	Martín Jaite; John McEnroe	6; 0	6; 8	6; 3

== Group II ==
The winner in Group II advanced to the Americas Zone Group I in 1989.

=== Participating nations ===
- Bolivia
- Colombia
- Cuba
- Haiti
- Jamaica
- Uruguay
- Venezuela

==== Draw ====
First Round; 5–7 February
Uruguay
bye
Havana, Cuba (hard)
Cuba	4
Bolivia	1
Caracas, Venezuela (hard)
Venezuela	4
Colombia	1
Kingston, Jamaica (hard)
Jamaica	5
Haiti	0

Second Round; 8–11 April
Havana, Cuba (hard)
Uruguay	5
Cuba	0
Kingston, Jamaica (hard)
Venezuela	3
Jamaica	2

Third Round; 22–24 July
Montevideo, Uruguay (clay)
Uruguay	4
Venezuela	1

- Uruguay are promoted to Group I in 1989.

=== First round ===
==== Cuba vs. Bolivia ====
Cuba
4
Havana, Cuba
5–7 February 1988
Hard

Bolivia
1

			1	2	3	4	5
1	(Cuba) (Bolivia)	Juan Pino; Mario Martínez	6; 4	3; 6	4; 6	6; 2	6; 3
2	(Cuba) (Bolivia)	Mario Tabares; Juan Carlos Alvarado	6; 2	6; 4	6; 2
3	(Cuba) (Bolivia)	Juan Pino / Mario Tabares; Juan Carlos Alvarado / Mario Martínez	6; 3	10; 8	6; 4
4	(Cuba) (Bolivia)	Tomás Rodríguez Sánchez; Hrvoje Eterovic	6; 3	6; 3
5	(Cuba) (Bolivia)	Mario Tabares; Mario Martínez	3; 6	6; 1	3; 6

==== Venezuela vs. Colombia ====
Venezuela
4
Caracas, Venezuela
5–7 February 1988
Hard

Colombia
1

			1	2	3	4	5
1	(Venezuela) (Colombia)	Nicolás Pereira; Mario Rincón	6; 3	6; 1	6; 2
2	(Venezuela) (Colombia)	Carlos Claverie; Álvaro Jordan	6; 3	5; 7	13; 15	9; 11
3	(Venezuela) (Colombia)	Iñaki Calvo / Nicolás Pereira; Jorge Falla / Álvaro Jordan	6; 2	8; 6	6; 3
4	(Venezuela) (Colombia)	Carlos Claverie; Mario Rincón	9; 7	6; 2	6; 3
5	(Venezuela) (Colombia)	Nicolás Pereira; Álvaro Jordan	6; 4	5; 1				retired

==== Jamaica vs. Haiti ====
Jamaica
5
Eric Bell Tennis Centre, Kingston, Jamaica
5–7 February 1988
Hard

Haiti
0

			1	2	3	4	5
1	(Jamaica) (Haiti)	Doug Burke; Bertrand Lacombe	6; 2	8; 6	6; 4
2	(Jamaica) (Haiti)	Noel Rutherford; Rénald Étienne	4; 6	7; 5	2; 2			retired
3	(Jamaica) (Haiti)	Doug Burke / Karl Hale; Bertrand Lacombe / Ruben Lamothe	6; 8	6; 4	6; 3	6; 3
4	(Jamaica) (Haiti)	Noel Rutherford; Bertrand Lacombe	6; 2	6; 4
5	(Jamaica) (Haiti)	Doug Burke; Patrice Baker	6; 0	6; 1

=== Second round ===
==== Cuba vs. Uruguay ====
Cuba
0
Havana, Cuba
8–10 April 1988
Hard

Uruguay
5

			1	2	3	4	5
1	(Cuba) (Uruguay)	Mario Tabares; Victor Caldarelli	4; 6	4; 6	6; 3	6; 2	3; 6
2	(Cuba) (Uruguay)	Juan Pino; Diego Pérez	3; 6	3; 6	1; 6
3	(Cuba) (Uruguay)	Juan Pino / Mario Tabares; Marcelo Filippini / Diego Pérez	6; 2	3; 6	1; 6	4; 6
4	(Cuba) (Uruguay)	Mario Tabares; Diego Pérez	2; 6	6; 2	4; 6
5	(Cuba) (Uruguay)	Juan Pino; Victor Caldarelli	6; 3	3; 6	4; 6

==== Jamaica vs. Venezuela ====
Jamaica
2
Eric Bell Tennis Centre, Kingston, Jamaica
8–11 April 1988
Hard

Venezuela
3

			1	2	3	4	5
1	(Jamaica) (Venezuela)	Noel Rutherford; Nicolás Pereira	4; 6	7; 5	4; 6	4; 6
2	(Jamaica) (Venezuela)	Doug Burke; Carlos Claverie	6; 3	7; 5	6; 8	6; 3
3	(Jamaica) (Venezuela)	Doug Burke / Karl Hale; Alfonso Mora / Nicolás Pereira	6; 4	2; 6	3; 6	2; 6
4	(Jamaica) (Venezuela)	Doug Burke; Nicolás Pereira	11; 9	4; 6	6; 3	19; 17
5	(Jamaica) (Venezuela)	Noel Rutherford; Carlos Claverie	9; 7	10; 8	5; 7	10; 12	4; 6

=== Third round ===
==== Uruguay vs. Venezuela ====
Uruguay
4
Montevideo, Uruguay
22–24 July 1988
Clay

Venezuela
1

			1	2	3	4	5
1	(Uruguay) (Venezuela)	Diego Pérez; Nicolás Pereira	6; 2	6; 3	6; 0
2	(Uruguay) (Venezuela)	Marcelo Filippini; Carlos Claverie	6; 2	6; 2	6; 3
3	(Uruguay) (Venezuela)	Victor Caldarelli / Diego Pérez; Alfonso Mora / Nicolás Pereira	6; 2	8; 10	3; 6	7; 9
4	(Uruguay) (Venezuela)	Marcelo Filippini; Nicolás Pereira	6; 2	6; 2	6; 2
5	(Uruguay) (Venezuela)	Diego Pérez; Carlos Claverie	6; 3	6; 0
