= Philippe Moggio =

French-Colombian tennis player

- Born: March 23, 1973 (age 52)
- Occupation: General Secretary of CONCACAF
- Spouse: Jane
- Children: Two; Joaquin and Tatiana

Philippe Moggio is a French-Colombian former professional tennis player, banker, sports executive and current General Secretary of CONCACAF.

Moggio was appointed to the position in May 2016.

He represented Colombia at the 1996, 1997, 1998 and 1999 Davis Cup.
