= Gabriel Silberstein =

Chilean tennis player (born 1974)

- Full name: Gabriel Silberstein Berisic
- Country (sports): Chile
- Born: 17 October 1974 (age 51) Neumünster, West Germany
- Height: 1.78 m (5 ft 10 in)
- Turned pro: 1993
- Plays: Right-handed
- Prize money: $116,651

Singles
- Career record: 11–14
- Career titles: 0; 1 Challenger, 0 Futures
- Highest ranking: No. 131 (1 December 1997)

Grand Slam singles results
- Australian Open: Q1 (1997)

Doubles
- Career record: 3–8
- Career titles: 0; 0 Challenger, 0 Futures
- Highest ranking: No. 261 (13 June 1994)
Medal record
Tennis
Representing Chile
Pan American Games
Bronze medal – third place	1995 Mar del Plata	Men's doubles
- Last updated on: 3 September 2022.

Gabriel Silberstein (born 17 October 1974) is a former professional tennis player from Chile.

== Biography ==
=== Early career ===
As a junior he was a strong performer and most notably finished runner-up in the boys' doubles with Marcelo Ríos at the 1992 US Open. He won his first Challenger match aged 17 and in 1992 won a Challenger tournament in Ribeirão.

=== Professional tour ===
In 1993 he began competing professionally and made his first ATP Tour main draw appearance the following year at Santiago. He was one of the successful qualifiers at the 1995 ATP German Open, a top-tier event now known as the Hamburg Masters. At the end of the 1997 season he reached his best ranking of 131 in the world, following a year which included wins over Karol Kučera in St Poelten and Carlos Costa in Santiago.

=== Representative career ===
Silberstein featured in a total of 9 ties for the Chile Davis Cup team from 1993 to 1997.

In 1995 he suffered disappointment, having started a tie against Argentina with a win over Franco Davín, it was his loss to Javier Frana in the final reverse singles that decided the tie, a match Silbertein led two sets to love.

He helped Chile reach the World Group qualifiers in the 1997 Davis Cup. His defeat of Ecuador's Nicolás Lapentti in five sets started Chile's campaign and he finished off the tie by beating Luis Morejón in a dead rubber to secure a 4–1 win. His most significant contribution came in the next tie, against Argentina at the National Stadium in Santiago. With the tie level at 1-1, a scoreline which included a loss for Silberstein to Hernán Gumy, he teamed up with Ríos in the doubles to beat Javier Frana and Luis Lobo in five sets. Ríos then gave Chile the tie over their South American rivals with victory in the first of the reverse singles, setting up a qualifying match against India. History repeated itself in the tie with India, as Silberstein again squandered a two set lead in the fifth and deciding rubber, to lose to Mahesh Bhupathi. He finished his Davis Cup career with an 8–6 record in singles, 11-9 overall.

At the 1995 Pan American Games he won a bronze medal for Chile in the men's doubles event, with partner Sergio Cortés.

=== Personal life ===
Silberstein emigrated to Chile from West Germany. He was born in Neumünster, a city in the northern state of Schleswig-Holstein.

His youngest brother, Álvaro, was seriously injured in a 2004 car accident, which left him with full paralysis from the chest down In 2016 Álvaro trekked Patagonia in a wheelchair, a trip that captured media attention and was filmed by a documentary crew.

== ATP Challenger and ITF Futures finals ==
=== Singles: 3 (1–2) ===
Legend ATP Challenger (1–2) ITF Futures (0–0)	Finals by surface Hard (0–0) Clay (1–2) Grass (0–0) Carpet (0–0)

Result	W–L	Date	Tournament	Tier	Surface	Opponent	Score
Win	1–0	Aug 1992	Ribeirão Preto, Brazil	Challenger	Clay	(Cuba) Mario Tabares	7–6, 7–6
Loss	1–1	Jun 1995	Bogotá, Colombia	Challenger	Clay	(France) Jérôme Golmard	6–2, 3–6, 2–6
Loss	1–2	Jul 1996	Oberstaufen, Germany	Challenger	Clay	(Germany) Jens Knippschild	3–6, 7–5, 6–7

=== Doubles: 2 (0–2) ===
Legend ATP Challenger (0–2) ITF Futures (0–0)	Finals by surface Hard (0–0) Clay (0–2) Grass (0–0) Carpet (0–0)

Result	W–L	Date	Tournament	Tier	Surface	Partner	Opponents	Score
Loss	0–1	Jun 1994	Weiden, Germany	Challenger	Clay	(Israel) Eyal Ran	(United States) Tommy Ho (Portugal) Nuno Marques	3–6, 1–6
Loss	0–2	Nov 1995	Santiago, Chile	Challenger	Clay	(Venezuela) Nicolás Lapentti	(United States) Brandon Coupe (Canada) Sébastien Leblanc	6–3, 5–7, 4–6

== Junior Grand Slam finals ==
=== Doubles: 1 (1 runner-up) ===
Result	Year	Tournament	Surface	Partnet	Opponents	Score
Loss	1992	US Open	Hard	(Chile) Marcelo Ríos	(United States) Eric Taino (United States) Jimmy Jackson	3–6, 6–3, 1–6

== See also ==
- List of Chile Davis Cup team representatives
