= Sergio Cortés =

Chilean tennis player (born 1968)

- Full name: Sergio Cortés Godoy
- Country (sports): Chile
- Residence: Santiago
- Born: 11 January 1968 (age 58) Antofagasta, Chile
- Height: 1.68 m (5 ft 6 in)
- Turned pro: 1987
- Plays: Right-handed
- Prize money: $247,706

Singles
- Career record: 18-26
- Career titles: 0
- Highest ranking: No. 114 (14 Jun 1993)

Grand Slam singles results
- US Open: 3R (1993)

Sergio Cortés Godoy (born 11 January 1968) is a former professional tennis player from Chile.

== Career ==
Cortés was a leading junior player in South American, winning the continental championships in the 14s, 16s and 18s age groups.

He was a quarter-finalist in the 1989 Geneva Open.

Cortés competed in just one Grand Slam event, the 1993 US Open, where he reached the third round. He defeated American Derrick Rostagno and Dutchman Jacco Eltingh, both in four sets and was then eliminated in straight sets by Boris Becker.

In 1993, he had one of the best wins of his career when he beat world number 31 Magnus Larsson at the Lipton Championships in Florida

Cortés made the quarter-finals of a Bogotá ATP tournament, along the way defeating Andrei Chesnokov, then the world number 40.

He appeared in six ties for the Chile Davis Cup team, with a record of 5–5 in singles and 2–0 in doubles.

== Challenger titles ==
=== Singles: (3) ===
No.	Year	Tournament	Surface	Opponent	Score
1.	1989	São Paulo, Brazil	Clay	(Argentina) Francisco Yunis	6–4, 6–3
2.	1992	Liege, Belgium	Clay	(Belgium) Bart Wuyts	6–7, 6–3, 6–4
3.	1992	Geneva, Switzerland	Clay	(Belgium) Filip Dewulf	6–7, 6–2, 6–4

=== Doubles: (1) ===
No.	Year	Tournament	Surface	Partner	Opponents	Score
1.	1994	Poznań, Poland	Clay	(Barbados) Martin Blackman	(Portugal) João Cunha-Silva (Portugal) Emanuel Couto	6–7, 7–5, 7–5
