= Uruguay Davis Cup team =

National sports team

Uruguay
- Captain: Enrique Pérez Cassarino
- Nations Ranking: 32 (20 September 2021)
- First year: 1931
- Years played: 45
- Ties played (W–L): 86 (42-44)
- Best finish: WG Play-offs (1990, 1992, 1994)
- Most total wins: Marcelo Filippini (42-36)
- Most singles wins: Marcelo Filippini (31-22); Diego Pérez (31-23)
- Most doubles wins: Marcel Felder (11-8)
- Best doubles team: Pablo Cuevas/Marcel Felder (7-1)
- Most ties played: Marcelo Filippini (33)
- Most years played: Diego Pérez (16)

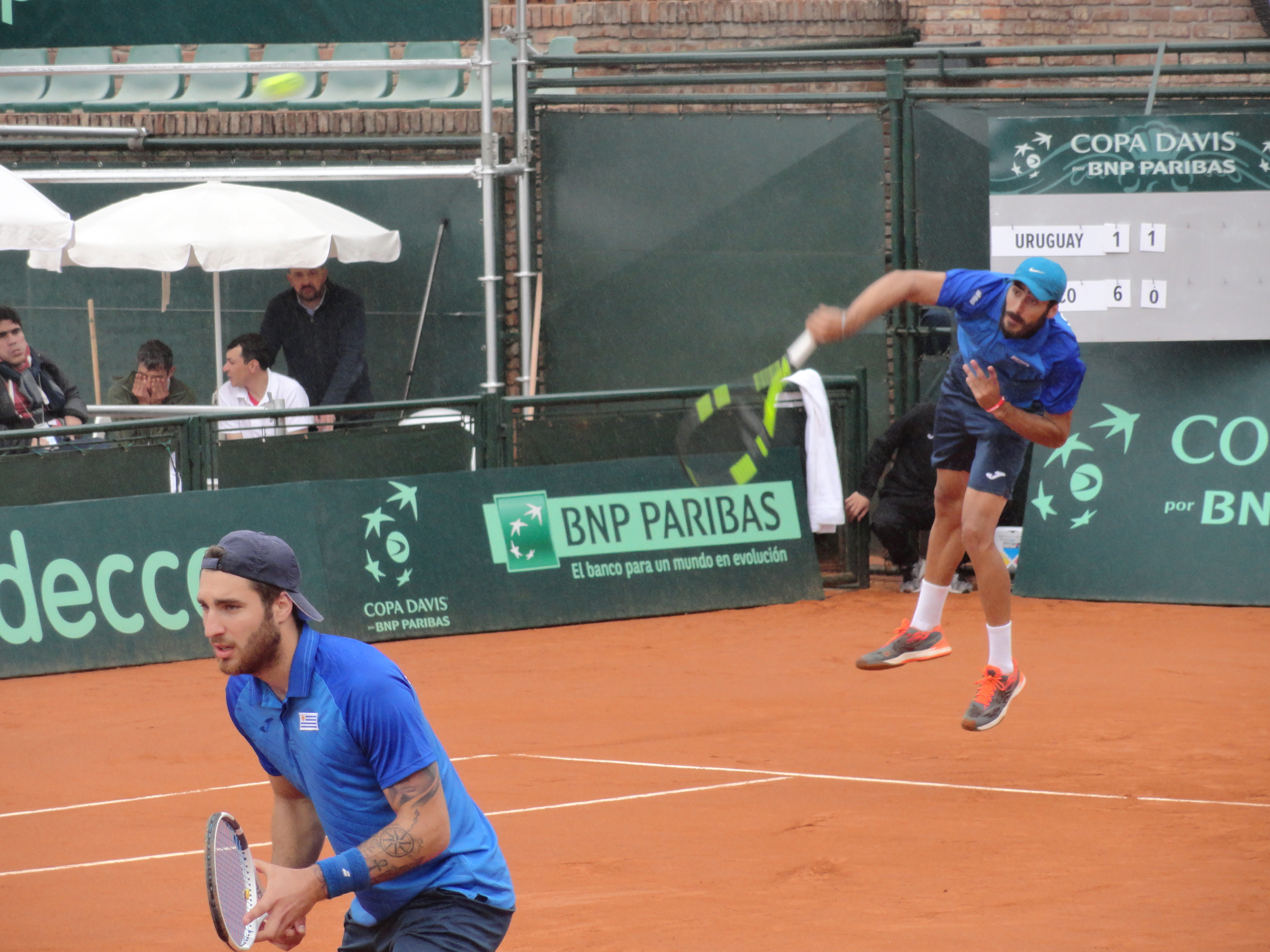
Rodrigo Arús and Nicolás Xiviller at the 2018 Davis Cup

The Uruguay national tennis team represents Uruguay in Davis Cup tennis competition and are governed by the Asociación Uruguaya de Tenis.

Uruguay had been playing in Group II since being relegated in 1996. In 2007, they won the Americas Zone Group II final against Paraguay without losing a rubber, and now competes in the Americas Zone Group I since 2019. In September 2019, the Uruguayan Davis Cup team defeated the Dominican Republic, winning entry into the highest Davis Cup tier, the 2020 Davis Cup World Group I.

== History ==
Uruguay competed in its first Davis Cup in 1931. Their best finish has been reaching the World Group play-offs, in 1990 (losing to Mexico), 1992 (losing to The Netherlands), and 1994 (losing to Austria).

== Current team (2024) ==
- Franco Roncadelli
- Joaquín Aguilar
- Ariel Behar
- Ignacio Carou
- Martín Cuevas

== See also ==
- Davis Cup
- Uruguay Billie Jean King Cup team
