= Mexico Davis Cup team =

National tennis team

Mexico
- Captain: Luis Díaz Barriga
- Nations Ranking: 37 (20 September 2021)
- First year: 1924
- Years played: 83
- Ties played (W–L): 168 (81–87)
- Years in World Group: 10 (2–10)
- Runners-up: 1 (1962)
- Most total wins: Rafael Osuna (42–23)
- Most singles wins: Alejandro Hernández (26–15)
- Most doubles wins: Rafael Osuna (17–8)
- Best doubles team: Rafael Osuna / Antonio Palafox (13–4)
- Most ties played: Santiago González (26)
- Most years played: Leonardo Lavalle (14); Jorge Lozano (14)

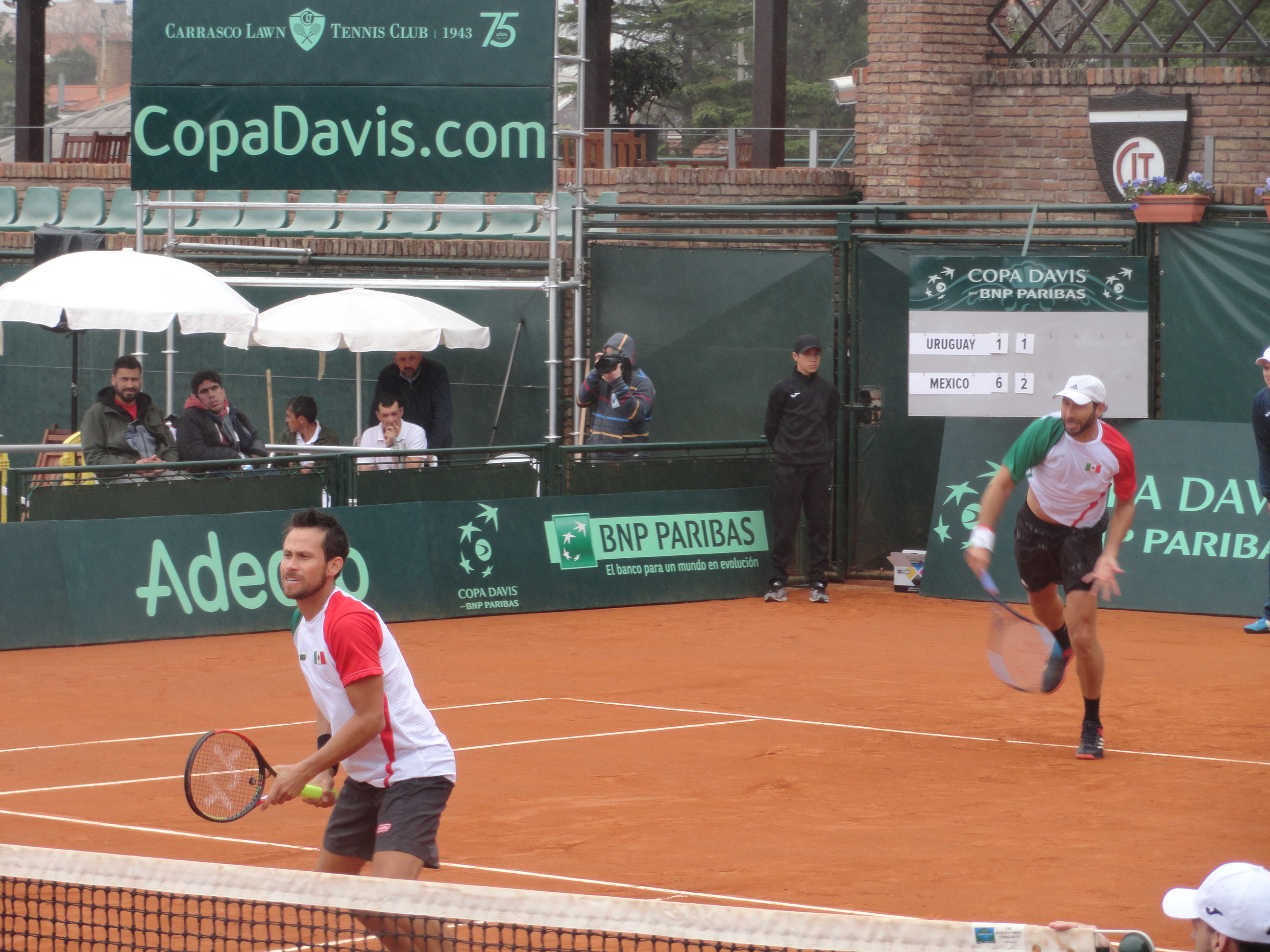
Santiago González and Miguel Ángel Reyes at the 2018 Davis Cup

The Mexico national tennis team represents Mexico in Davis Cup tennis competition and are governed by the Federación Mexicana de Tenis.

Mexico finished as runners-up in 1962 losing with Australia 5-0 in Melbourne. They currently compete in the World Group I Play-Offs. They last competed in the World Group in 1997.

== History ==
Mexico competed in its first Davis Cup in 1924.

== Current team (2024) ==
- Diego Ignacio Rifel Paz (singles)
- Rodrigo Pacheco Méndez (singles)
- Alan Fernando Rubio Fierros (singles)
- Santiago González (doubles)
- Miguel Ángel Reyes Varela (doubles)

== See also ==
- Davis Cup
- Mexico Billie Jean King Cup team
