= Bahamas Davis Cup team =

National sports team

The Bahamas men's national tennis team represents the Bahamas in Davis Cup tennis competition and are governed by the Bahamas Lawn Tennis Association.

The Bahamas currently compete in the Americas Zone of Group III. They reached the World Group play-offs in 1993.

== History ==
The Bahamas competed in its first Davis Cup in 1989. Bahamian players previously competed on the Caribbean/West Indies team.

== Current team (2022) ==
- Kevin Major
- Spencer Newman
- Baker Newman
- Marvin Rolle (Captain-player)

== See also ==
- Davis Cup
- Bahamas Billie Jean King Cup team
