= 1991 Davis Cup Americas Zone =

International tennis competition

The Americas Zone was one of the three zones of the regional Davis Cup competition in 1991.

In the Americas Zone there were two different tiers, called groups, in which teams competed against each other to advance to the upper tier.

== Group I ==
Winners in Group I advanced to the World Group qualifying round, along with losing teams from the World Group first round. Teams who lost their respective first-round ties were relegated to the Americas Zone Group II in 1992.

=== Participating nations ===
- Brazil
- Cuba
- Paraguay
- Peru
- Uruguay

==== Draw ====
First Round; 1–4 February
Cuba
bye
bye
Paraguay
São Paulo, Brazil (hard)
Brazil	3
Peru	1
bye
Uruguay

Second Round; 29–31 March
Havana, Cuba (hard)
Cuba	5
Paraguay	0
Brasília, Brazil (indoor carpet)
Brazil	4
Uruguay	1

- Cuba and Brazil advance to World Group qualifying round.
- Peru relegated to Group II in 1992.

=== First round ===
==== Brazil vs. Peru ====
Brazil
3
Hotel Transamerica, São Paulo, Brazil
1–4 February 1991
Hard

Peru
1

			1	2	3	4	5
1	(Brazil) (Peru)	Luiz Mattar; Carlos di Laura	6^{3} 7^{7}	6; 3	6; 2	6; 1
2	(Brazil) (Peru)	Jaime Oncins; José Luis Noriega	6; 3	6; 2	6; 2
3	(Brazil) (Peru)	Mauro Menezes / Fernando Roese; Carlos di Laura / José Luis Noriega	5; 7	7^{8} 6^{6}	6^{4} 7^{7}	7; 5	13; 15
4	(Brazil) (Peru)	Luiz Mattar; José Luis Noriega	6; 2	6; 1	7; 5
5	(Brazil) (Peru)	Jaime Oncins; Carlos di Laura						not played

=== Second round ===
==== Cuba vs. Paraguay ====
Cuba
5
Hotel de Varadero, Havana, Cuba
29–31 March 1991
Hard

Paraguay
0

			1	2	3	4	5
1	(Cuba) (Paraguay)	Juan Pino; Rubén Alvarenga	6; 1	6; 1	5; 7	4; 6	6; 1
2	(Cuba) (Paraguay)	Mario Tabares; Ricardo Mena	6; 2	6; 0	4; 6	6; 2
3	(Cuba) (Paraguay)	Juan Pino / Mario Tabares; Rubén Alvarenga / Octavio de la Sobera	6; 2	7; 5	6; 4
4	(Cuba) (Paraguay)	Mario Tabares; Rubén Alvarenga	6; 2	6; 1
5	(Cuba) (Paraguay)	Juan Pino; Ricardo Mena	6; 4	4; 6	6; 3

==== Brazil vs. Uruguay ====
Brazil
4
Tennis Academy, Brasília, Brazil
29–31 March 1991
Carpet (indoors)

Uruguay
1

			1	2	3	4	5
1	(Brazil) (Uruguay)	Jaime Oncins; Marcelo Filippini	6; 4	6; 4	6^{2} 7^{7}	6; 3
2	(Brazil) (Uruguay)	Luiz Mattar; Diego Pérez	6; 2	5; 7	4; 6	4; 6
3	(Brazil) (Uruguay)	Nelson Aerts / Fernando Roese; Marcelo Filippini / Diego Pérez	6; 3	7^{9} 6^{7}	6; 3
4	(Brazil) (Uruguay)	Luiz Mattar; Marcelo Filippini	7^{7} 6^{2}	6; 4	6; 3
5	(Brazil) (Uruguay)	Jaime Oncins; Diego Pérez	6; 4	6; 3

== Group II ==
The winner in Group II advanced to the Americas Zone Group I in 1992.

=== Participating nations ===
- Bahamas
- Barbados
- Bolivia
- Chile
- Colombia
- Costa Rica
- Dominican Republic
- Eastern Caribbean
- Ecuador
- El Salvador
- Guatemala
- Jamaica
- Haiti
- Trinidad and Tobago
- Venezuela

==== Draw ====
First Round; 1–3 February
Chile
bye
San Salvador, El Salvador (clay)
Dominican Republic	4
El Salvador	1
Port of Spain, Trinidad and Tobago (hard)
Ecuador	5
Trinidad and Tobago	0
Port-au-Prince, Haiti (clay)
Haiti	1
Venezuela	4
Nassau, Bahamas (hard)
Bahamas	4
Costa Rica	1
Cochabamba, Bolivia (clay)
Bolivia	2
Barbados	3
St. John's, Antigua and Barbuda (hard)
Eastern Caribbean	3
Guatemala	2
Kingston, Jamaica (hard)
Jamaica	2
Colombia	3

Second Round; 29 March–7 April
Santiago, Chile (clay)
Chile	5
Dominican Republic	0
Caracas, Venezuela (hard)
Ecuador	2
Venezuela	3
Nassau, Bahamas (hard)
Bahamas	3
Barbados	2
St. John's, Antigua and Barbuda (hard)
Eastern Caribbean	0
Colombia	5

Third Round; 19–28 July
Santiago, Chile (clay)
Chile	3
Venezuela	2
Cali, Colombia (clay)
Bahamas	1
Colombia	4

Third Round; 20–22 September
Medellín, Colombia (clay)
Chile	3
Colombia	1

- Chile promoted to Group I in 1992.

=== First round ===
==== El Salvador vs. Dominican Republic ====
El Salvador
1
Maya Country Club, San Salvador, El Salvador
1–3 February 1991
Clay

Dominican Republic
4

			1	2	3	4	5
1	(El Salvador) (Dominican Republic)	Manuel Antonio Tejada Ruiz; Rafael Moreno	6; 4	7; 5	4; 6	4; 6	4; 6
2	(El Salvador) (Dominican Republic)	Miguel Merz; Genaro Deleon	6^{5} 7^{7}	6; 3	7^{7} 6^{5}	1; 6	6; 3
3	(El Salvador) (Dominican Republic)	Miguel Merz / José Pineda; Genaro Deleon / Rafael Moreno	1; 6	4; 6	4; 6
4	(El Salvador) (Dominican Republic)	Manuel Antonio Tejada Ruiz; Genaro Deleon	4; 6	3; 6	6; 3	1; 6
5	(El Salvador) (Dominican Republic)	Miguel Merz; Rafael Moreno	4; 6	5; 7

==== Trinidad and Tobago vs. Ecuador ====
Trinidad and Tobago
0
Jean Pierre Sports Complex, Port of Spain, Trinidad and Tobago
1–3 February 1991
Hard

Ecuador
5

			1	2	3	4	5
1	(Trinidad and Tobago) (Ecuador)	Orville Adams; Luis Morejón	2; 6	2; 6	1; 6
2	(Trinidad and Tobago) (Ecuador)	Mark Webster; Pablo Campana	2; 6	2; 6	2; 6
3	(Trinidad and Tobago) (Ecuador)	Orville Adams / Christopher Mark; Pablo Campana / Luis Morejón	6; 3	7; 5	6^{2} 7^{7}	2; 6	4; 6
4	(Trinidad and Tobago) (Ecuador)	Orville Adams; Pablo Campana	4; 6	6^{7} 7^{9}
5	(Trinidad and Tobago) (Ecuador)	Mark Webster; Luis Morejón	4; 6	2; 6

==== Haiti vs. Venezuela ====
Haiti
1
Cercle Bellevue, Port-au-Prince, Haiti
1–3 February 1991
Clay

Venezuela
4

			1	2	3	4	5
1	(Haiti) (Venezuela)	Bertrand Lacombe; Maurice Ruah	2; 6	6; 4	3; 6	1; 6
2	(Haiti) (Venezuela)	Bertrand Madsen; Salvador Colvee	6; 2	1; 6	6; 3	6^{0} 7^{7}	6; 3
3	(Haiti) (Venezuela)	Bertrand Lacombe / Ruben Lamothe; Harold Castillo / Alfonso Mora	6; 3	5; 7	3; 6	2; 6
4	(Haiti) (Venezuela)	Bertrand Madsen; Maurice Ruah	6; 4	4; 6	6^{8} 7^{10}	3; 6
5	(Haiti) (Venezuela)	Bertrand Lacombe; Salvador Colvee	6^{4} 7^{7}	3; 6

==== Bahamas vs. Costa Rica ====
Bahamas
4
Carnival Crystal Palace, Nassau, Bahamas
1–3 February 1991
Hard

Costa Rica
1

			1	2	3	4	5
1	(The Bahamas) (Costa Rica)	John Farrington; Rafael Ávalos Brenes	7^{7} 6^{4}	4; 6	6; 3	5; 7	5; 7
2	(The Bahamas) (Costa Rica)	Roger Smith; Carlos Roberto Páez	6; 0	6; 2	6; 2
3	(The Bahamas) (Costa Rica)	John Farrington / Roger Smith; Rafael Ávalos Brenes / Mario Delgado	6; 1	6; 2	6; 1
4	(The Bahamas) (Costa Rica)	Roger Smith; Mario Delgado	6; 0	6; 4	6; 1
5	(The Bahamas) (Costa Rica)	John Farrington; Carlos Roberto Páez	6; 4	6; 4

==== Bolivia vs. Barbados ====
Bolivia
2
Club de Tenis Cochabamba, Cochabamba, Bolivia
1–3 February 1991
Clay

Barbados
3

			1	2	3	4	5
1	(Bolivia) (Barbados)	José Medrano; Richard Ashby	6; 4	6^{4} 7^{7}	3; 6	7; 5	18; 20
2	(Bolivia) (Barbados)	Rodrigo Navarro; Lionel Eli	7^{7} 6^{1}	6; 4	6^{1} 7^{7}	3; 6	6; 3
3	(Bolivia) (Barbados)	Ricardo Aguirre / Rodrigo Navarro; Richard Ashby / Bernard Frost	4; 6	5; 7	4; 6
4	(Bolivia) (Barbados)	Rodrigo Navarro; Richard Ashby	6^{4} 7^{7}	3; 6	4; 6
5	(Bolivia) (Barbados)	José Medrano; Lionel Eli	7; 5	6^{4} 7^{7}	8; 6

==== Eastern Caribbean vs. Guatemala ====
Eastern Caribbean
3
Royal Antiguan Hotel, St. John's, Antigua and Barbuda
1–3 February 1991
Hard

Guatemala
2

			1	2	3	4	5
1	(Eastern Caribbean) (Guatemala)	Vernon Lewis; Daniel Chávez Morales	6; 1	6^{1} 7^{7}	6; 3	7^{7} 6^{5}
2	(Eastern Caribbean) (Guatemala)	John Maginley; Carlos Chávez	4; 6	3; 6	7; 5	6; 4	9; 7
3	(Eastern Caribbean) (Guatemala)	Vernon Lewis / John Maginley; Daniel Chávez Morales / Fabio Sical	2; 6	4; 6	6^{3} 7^{7}
4	(Eastern Caribbean) (Guatemala)	Vernon Lewis; Fabio Sical	6; 1	6; 3	6; 0
5	(Eastern Caribbean) (Guatemala)	John Maginley; Daniel Chávez Morales	6; 4	1; 6	4; 6

==== Jamaica vs. Colombia ====
Jamaica
2
Eric Bell Tennis Centre, Kingston, Jamaica
1–3 February 1991
Hard

Colombia
3

			1	2	3	4	5
1	(Jamaica) (Colombia)	Doug Burke; Mario Rincón	5; 7	7^{7} 6^{2}	6; 3	6; 2
2	(Jamaica) (Colombia)	Noel Rutherford; Álvaro Jordan	7; 5	6^{6} 7^{8}	5; 7	2; 6
3	(Jamaica) (Colombia)	Doug Burke / Karl Hale; Mauricio Hadad / Álvaro Jordan	7^{7} 6^{4}	7^{9} 6^{7}	3; 6	6; 3
4	(Jamaica) (Colombia)	Noel Rutherford; Mario Rincón	4; 6	7^{9} 6^{7}	5; 7	6; 4	1; 6
5	(Jamaica) (Colombia)	Doug Burke; Álvaro Jordan	3; 6	2; 6	4; 6

=== Second round ===
==== Chile vs. Dominican Republic ====
Chile
5
Stade Francais, Santiago, Chile
29–31 March 1991
Clay

Dominican Republic
0

			1	2	3	4	5
1	(Chile) (Dominican Republic)	José Antonio Fernández; Genaro Deleon	6; 1	6; 2	6; 4
2	(Chile) (Dominican Republic)	Pedro Rebolledo; Rafael Moreno	6; 2	6; 1	6; 1
3	(Chile) (Dominican Republic)	Hans Gildemeister / Felipe Rivera; Genaro Deleon / Rafael Moreno	6; 4	6; 4	7; 5
4	(Chile) (Dominican Republic)	Pedro Rebolledo; Genaro Deleon	6; 3	6; 1
5	(Chile) (Dominican Republic)	José Antonio Fernández; Rafael Moreno	6; 4	6; 3

==== Venezuela vs. Ecuador ====
Venezuela
3
Altamira Tennis Club, Caracas, Venezuela
29–31 March 1991
Hard

Ecuador
2

			1	2	3	4	5
1	(Venezuela) (Ecuador)	Salvador Colvee; Hugo Núñez	6^{6} 7^{8}	6; 0	6^{5} 7^{7}	5; 7
2	(Venezuela) (Ecuador)	Maurice Ruah; Luis Morejón	5; 7	6; 2	6; 4	6; 2
3	(Venezuela) (Ecuador)	Juan Carlos Bianchi / Alfonso Mora; Pablo Campana / Hugo Núñez	6; 4	3; 6	6^{5} 7^{7}	4; 6
4	(Venezuela) (Ecuador)	Maurice Ruah; Hugo Núñez	6; 4	6; 4	6; 3
5	(Venezuela) (Ecuador)	Salvador Colvee; Luis Morejón	7^{7} 6^{1}	3; 6	7; 5	6; 3

==== Bahamas vs. Barbados ====
Bahamas
3
Carnival Crystal Palace, Nassau, Bahamas
29–31 March 1991
Hard

Barbados
2

			1	2	3	4	5
1	(The Bahamas) (Barbados)	Roger Smith; Lionel Eli	6; 1	6; 3	6; 1
2	(The Bahamas) (Barbados)	John Farrington; Richard Ashby	6^{5} 7^{7}	6; 3	3; 6	6^{5} 7^{7}
3	(The Bahamas) (Barbados)	John Farrington / Roger Smith; Richard Ashby / Bernard Frost	6; 3	4; 6	6; 3	6^{5} 7^{7}	12; 14
4	(The Bahamas) (Barbados)	Roger Smith; Richard Ashby	7; 5	7; 5	5; 7	6; 4
5	(The Bahamas) (Barbados)	John Farrington; Lionel Eli	6; 2	5; 7	6^{4} 7^{7}	6; 4	6; 4

==== Eastern Caribbean vs. Colombia ====
Eastern Caribbean
0
Royal Antiguan Hotel, St. John's, Antigua and Barbuda
5–7 April 1991
Hard

Colombia
5

			1	2	3	4	5
1	(Eastern Caribbean) (Colombia)	Vernon Lewis; Jaime Cortés	4; 6	1; 6	7^{7} 6^{4}	4; 6
2	(Eastern Caribbean) (Colombia)	John Maginley; Álvaro Jordan	7^{7} 6^{5}	0; 6	5; 7	2; 6
3	(Eastern Caribbean) (Colombia)	Richard Hughes / Jerry Williams; Mauricio Hadad / Álvaro Jordan	2; 6	6; 3	5; 7	3; 6
4	(Eastern Caribbean) (Colombia)	Vernon Lewis; Álvaro Jordan	2; 6	4; 6
5	(Eastern Caribbean) (Colombia)	Jerry Williams; Jaime Cortés	3; 6	2; 6

=== Third round ===
==== Chile vs. Venezuela ====
Chile
3
Estadio Nacional, Santiago, Chile
26–28 July 1991
Clay

Venezuela
2

			1	2	3	4	5
1	(Chile) (Venezuela)	José Antonio Fernández; Maurice Ruah	3; 6	6; 2	3; 6	6; 1	6; 3
2	(Chile) (Venezuela)	Pedro Rebolledo; Nicolás Pereira	6; 3	6; 1	2; 6	6; 4
3	(Chile) (Venezuela)	Hans Gildemeister / Gerardo Vacarezza; Alfonso Mora / Nicolás Pereira	4; 6	6; 1	6^{5} 7^{7}	3; 6
4	(Chile) (Venezuela)	Pedro Rebolledo; Maurice Ruah	5; 7	6; 3	6; 2	6; 4
5	(Chile) (Venezuela)	José Antonio Fernández; Nicolás Pereira	6; 4	0; 6	3; 6

==== Colombia vs. Bahamas ====
Colombia
4
Clube Desportivo de Canas Gordas, Cali, Colombia
19–21 July 1991
Clay

Bahamas
1

			1	2	3	4	5
1	(Colombia) (The Bahamas)	Mauricio Hadad; Roger Smith	6; 4	4; 6	6; 3	6; 1
2	(Colombia) (The Bahamas)	Álvaro Jordan; John Farrington	6; 2	6; 2	6; 2
3	(Colombia) (The Bahamas)	Jaime Cortés / Mario Rincón; John Farrington / Roger Smith	3; 6	5; 7	4; 6
4	(Colombia) (The Bahamas)	Álvaro Jordan; Roger Smith	6; 3	6^{5} 7^{7}	6^{4} 7^{7}	6; 0	6; 3
5	(Colombia) (The Bahamas)	Mauricio Hadad; John Farrington	6; 4	6; 2

=== Fourth round ===
==== Colombia vs. Chile ====
Colombia
1
Club Campestre el Rodeo, Medellín, Colombia
20–22 September 1991
Clay

Chile
3

			1	2	3	4	5
1	(Colombia) (Chile)	Jaime Cortés; Pedro Rebolledo	3; 6	0; 6	1; 6
2	(Colombia) (Chile)	Álvaro Jordan; José Antonio Fernández	4; 6	5; 7	3; 6
3	(Colombia) (Chile)	Mauricio Hadad / Álvaro Jordan; Hans Gildemeister / Gerardo Vacarezza	6; 4	4; 6	6^{4} 7^{7}	3; 6
4	(Colombia) (Chile)	Álvaro Jordan; Pedro Rebolledo	2; 6	6; 3	7; 5
5	(Colombia) (Chile)	Jaime Cortés; José Antonio Fernández	1; 6	7; 5	2; 3			not completed
