= 1990 Davis Cup Americas Zone =

International tennis competition

The Americas Zone was one of the three zones of the regional Davis Cup competition in 1990.

In the Americas Zone there were two different tiers, called groups, in which teams competed against each other to advance to the upper tier.

== Group I ==
Winners in Group I advanced to the World Group qualifying round, along with losing teams from the World Group first round. Teams who lost their respective first round ties competed in the relegation play-off, with the winning teams remaining in Group I, whereas the team who lost their play-off was relegated to the Americas Zone Group II in 1991.

=== Participating nations ===
- Brazil
- Canada
- Chile
- Paraguay
- Peru
- Uruguay

==== Draw ====
Quarterfinals; 2–4 February
Paraguay
bye
Vancouver, Canada (indoor carpet)
Canada	4
Brazil	1
Montevideo, Uruguay (clay)
Uruguay	3
Chile	2
bye
Peru

Semifinals; 30 March–1 April
Asunción, Paraguay (clay)
Paraguay	0
Canada	5
Montevideo, Uruguay (clay)
Uruguay	4
Peru	1

- Canada and Uruguay advance to World Group qualifying round.

Relegation Play-off; 30 March–1 April
Brasília, Brazil (indoor hard)
Brazil	4
Chile	1

- Chile relegated to Group II in 1991.

=== First round ===
==== Canada vs. Brazil ====
Canada
4
Vancouver Convention Centre, Vancouver, Canada
2–4 February 1990
Carpet (indoors)

Brazil
1

			1	2	3	4	5
1	(Canada) (Brazil)	Grant Connell; Danilo Marcelino	7; 5	6; 3	6; 4
2	(Canada) (Brazil)	Andrew Sznajder; Luiz Mattar	6; 4	3; 6	7^{8} 6^{6}	6; 4
3	(Canada) (Brazil)	Grant Connell / Glenn Michibata; Luiz Mattar / Fernando Roese	6; 4	7; 5	7; 5
4	(Canada) (Brazil)	Grant Connell; Luiz Mattar	7^{7} 6^{4}	5; 7	6; 8
5	(Canada) (Brazil)	Andrew Sznajder; Danilo Marcelino	6; 4	6; 2

==== Uruguay vs. Chile ====
Uruguay
3
Carrasco Lawn Tennis Club, Montevideo, Uruguay
2–4 February 1990
Clay

Chile
2

			1	2	3	4	5
1	(Uruguay) (Chile)	Diego Pérez; Pedro Rebolledo	6; 3	4; 6	2; 6	0; 6
2	(Uruguay) (Chile)	Marcelo Filippini; Sergio Cortés	7; 5	6; 1	6; 2
3	(Uruguay) (Chile)	Victor Caldarelli / Marcelo Filippini; Cristián Araya / Pedro Rebolledo	3; 6	4; 6	4; 6
4	(Uruguay) (Chile)	Diego Pérez; Sergio Cortés	6; 3	6; 2	6; 2
5	(Uruguay) (Chile)	Marcelo Filippini; Pedro Rebolledo	6; 1	7; 5	6; 0

=== Second round ===
==== Paraguay vs. Canada ====
Paraguay
0
Yacht y Golf Club Paraguayo, Asunción, Paraguay
30 March–1 April 1990
Clay

Canada
5

			1	2	3	4	5
1	(Paraguay) (Canada)	Hugo Chapacú; Andrew Sznajder	2; 6	4; 6	2; 6
2	(Paraguay) (Canada)	Víctor Pecci; Martin Wostenholme	4; 6	2; 6	6; 3	0; 6
3	(Paraguay) (Canada)	Hugo Chapacú / Víctor Pecci; Grant Connell / Glenn Michibata	1; 6	2; 6	2; 6
4	(Paraguay) (Canada)	Ricardo Mena; Martin Wostenholme	1; 6	0; 6
5	(Paraguay) (Canada)	Rubén Alvarenga; Andrew Sznajder	4; 6	1; 6

==== Uruguay vs. Peru ====
Uruguay
4
Carrasco Lawn Tennis Club, Montevideo, Uruguay
30 March–1 April 1990
Clay

Peru
1

			1	2	3	4	5
1	(Uruguay) (Peru)	Diego Pérez; Jaime Yzaga	6; 4	6; 2	3; 6	1; 6	9; 7
2	(Uruguay) (Peru)	Marcelo Filippini; Alejandro Aramburú	5; 7	6; 0	6; 1	6; 2
3	(Uruguay) (Peru)	Daniel Montes de Oca / Nicolás Zurmendi; Carlos di Laura / Jaime Yzaga	4; 6	2; 6	5; 7
4	(Uruguay) (Peru)	Marcelo Filippini; Jaime Yzaga	6; 1	6; 3	6; 4
5	(Uruguay) (Peru)	Diego Pérez; Alejandro Aramburú	6; 1	2; 6	6; 2

=== Relegation play-off ===
==== Brazil vs. Chile ====
Brazil
4
Tennis Academy, Brasília, Brazil
30 March–1 April 1990
Hard (indoors)

Chile
1

			1	2	3	4	5
1	(Brazil) (Chile)	Fernando Roese; José Antonio Fernández	6; 1	6; 3	6; 2
2	(Brazil) (Chile)	Luiz Mattar; Gerardo Vacarezza	7^{7} 6^{5}	6; 3	6; 3
3	(Brazil) (Chile)	Danilo Marcelino / Mauro Menezes; Cristián Araya / Pedro Rebolledo	6^{5} 7^{7}	6; 4	7^{7} 6^{4}	6; 4
4	(Brazil) (Chile)	Fernando Roese; Gerardo Vacarezza	6; 2	6; 2
5	(Brazil) (Chile)	Mauro Menezes; José Antonio Fernández	4; 6	4; 6

== Group II ==
The winner in Group II advanced to the Americas Zone Group I in 1991.

=== Participating nations ===
- Bahamas
- Barbados
- Bolivia
- Colombia
- Costa Rica
- Cuba
- Dominican Republic
- Ecuador
- Guatemala
- Jamaica
- Haiti
- Trinidad and Tobago
- Venezuela

==== Draw ====
First Round; 2–4 February
Ecuador
bye
Port of Spain, Trinidad and Tobago (hard)
Haiti	5
Trinidad and Tobago	0
Cuba
bye
Caracas, Venezuela (clay)
Jamaica	0
Venezuela	5
Cali, Colombia (clay)
Colombia	4
Guatemala	1
Santo Domingo, Dominican Republic (clay)
Costa Rica	2
Dominican Republic	3
Saint Michael, Barbados (clay)
Barbados	3
Bolivia	2
bye
Bahamas

Second Round; 30 March–1 April
Port-au-Prince, Haiti (clay)
Ecuador	3
Haiti	2
Havana, Cuba (hard)
Cuba	4
Venezuela	1
Santo Domingo, Dominican Republic (clay)
Colombia	4
Dominican Republic	1
Saint Michael, Barbados (clay)
Barbados	4
Bahamas	1

Third Round; 15–17 June
Havana, Cuba (hard)
Ecuador	1
Cuba	4
Saint Peter, Barbados (hard)
Colombia	4
Barbados	1

Third Round; 20–22 July
Havana, Cuba (hard)
Cuba	3
Colombia	2

- Cuba promoted to Group I in 1991.

=== First round ===
==== Trinidad and Tobago vs. Haiti ====
Trinidad and Tobago
0
Jean Pierre Sports Complex, Port of Spain, Trinidad and Tobago
2–4 February 1990
Hard

Haiti
5

			1	2	3	4	5
1	(Trinidad and Tobago) (Haiti)	Mark Webster; Ronald Agénor	1; 6	1; 6	0; 6
2	(Trinidad and Tobago) (Haiti)	Orville Adams; Bertrand Lacombe	1; 6	4; 6	4; 6
3	(Trinidad and Tobago) (Haiti)	Orville Adams / David Attong; Ronald Agénor / Ruben Lamothe	1; 6	4; 6	6^{3} 7^{7}
4	(Trinidad and Tobago) (Haiti)	Orville Adams; Ronald Agénor	0; 6	3; 6
5	(Trinidad and Tobago) (Haiti)	Mark Webster; Bertrand Lacombe	1; 6	6^{7} 7^{9}

==== Venezuela vs. Jamaica ====
Venezuela
5
National Tennis Centre, Caracas, Venezuela
2–4 February 1990
Clay

Jamaica
0

			1	2	3	4	5
1	(Venezuela) (Jamaica)	Carlos Claverie; Doug Burke	6; 3	6; 4	3; 6	6; 4
2	(Venezuela) (Jamaica)	Maurice Ruah; Peter Campbell	4; 6	6; 3	6; 0	6; 1
3	(Venezuela) (Jamaica)	Alfonso Mora / Maurice Ruah; Doug Burke / Peter Campbell	6; 3	7^{8} 6^{6}	7^{8} 6^{6}
4	(Venezuela) (Jamaica)	Carlos Claverie; Peter Campbell	6; 2	6; 2
5	(Venezuela) (Jamaica)	Maurice Ruah; Doug Burke	6; 3	6; 3

==== Colombia vs. Guatemala ====
Colombia
4
Club Campestre El Rancho, Cali, Colombia
2–4 February 1990
Clay

Guatemala
1

			1	2	3	4	5
1	(Colombia) (Guatemala)	Mauricio Hadad; Daniel Chávez Morales	6; 0	6; 2	6; 3
2	(Colombia) (Guatemala)	Álvaro Jordan; Fabio Sical	6; 4	6; 1	7; 5
3	(Colombia) (Guatemala)	Jaime Cortés / Miguel Tobón; Daniel Chávez Morales / Fabio Sical	6; 4	1; 6	4; 6	6; 4	4; 6
4	(Colombia) (Guatemala)	Álvaro Jordan; Daniel Chávez Morales	7^{7} 6^{3}	7; 5	6; 1
5	(Colombia) (Guatemala)	Mauricio Hadad; Fabio Sical	6; 1	6; 4

==== Dominican Republic vs. Costa Rica ====
Dominican Republic
3
Caribbean Tennis Club, Santo Domingo, Dominican Republic
2–4 February 1990
Clay

Costa Rica
2

			1	2	3	4	5
1	(Dominican Republic) (Costa Rica)	Genaro Deleon; Kenneth Thome	6; 1	3; 6	4; 6	1; 6
2	(Dominican Republic) (Costa Rica)	Rafael Moreno; Rafael Ávalos Brenes	6; 1	6; 2	6; 1
3	(Dominican Republic) (Costa Rica)	Rafael Moreno / Marcel Olivares; Fred Thome / Kenneth Thome	2; 6	6; 4	3; 6	4; 6
4	(Dominican Republic) (Costa Rica)	Genaro Deleon; Rafael Ávalos Brenes	6; 1	6; 2	6; 2
5	(Dominican Republic) (Costa Rica)	Rafael Moreno; Kenneth Thome	3; 6	6; 4	3; 6	6; 4		retired

==== Barbados vs. Bolivia ====
Barbados
3
Paradise Beach Club, Saint Michael, Barbados
2–4 February 1990
Clay

Bolivia
2

			1	2	3	4	5
1	(Barbados) (Bolivia)	Richard Ashby; José Medrano	4; 6	7; 5	6; 1	6; 0
2	(Barbados) (Bolivia)	Adrian Clarke; Oscar Blacutt	6^{7} 7^{9}	3; 6	4; 6
3	(Barbados) (Bolivia)	Richard Ashby / Bernard Frost; Ricardo Aguirre / Oscar Blacutt	6; 2	6; 3	6^{2} 7^{7}	6; 4
4	(Barbados) (Bolivia)	Jimmy Tasker; José Medrano	2; 6	7; 5	1; 6	4; 6
5	(Barbados) (Bolivia)	Richard Ashby; Oscar Blacutt	6; 2	6; 4	6; 2

=== Second round ===
==== Haiti vs. Ecuador ====
Haiti
2
Cercle Bellevue, Port-au-Prince, Haiti
30 March–1 April 1990
Clay

Ecuador
3

			1	2	3	4	5
1	(Haiti) (Ecuador)	Bertrand Lacombe; Raúl Viver	4; 6	6; 3	4; 6	3; 6
2	(Haiti) (Ecuador)	Ronald Agénor; Giorgio Carneade	6; 2	4; 6	6; 3	4; 6	6; 3
3	(Haiti) (Ecuador)	Ronald Agénor / Ruben Lamothe; Pablo Campana / Giorgio Carneade	5; 7	6^{3} 7^{7}	3; 6
4	(Haiti) (Ecuador)	Ronald Agénor; Raúl Viver	6; 4	3; 6	7; 5	6; 1
5	(Haiti) (Ecuador)	Bertrand Lacombe; Giorgio Carneade	2; 6	3; 6	3; 6

==== Cuba vs. Venezuela ====
Cuba
4
Hotel de Varadero, Havana, Cuba
30 March–1 April 1990
Hard

Venezuela
1

			1	2	3	4	5
1	(Cuba) (Venezuela)	Mario Tabares; Maurice Ruah	6; 4	6; 1	6; 2
2	(Cuba) (Venezuela)	Juan Pino; Carlos Claverie	3; 6	3; 6	6; 4	7^{7} 6^{5}	3; 6
3	(Cuba) (Venezuela)	Juan Pino / Mario Tabares; Carlos Claverie / Alfonso Mora	3; 6	6; 4	6; 4	6; 1
4	(Cuba) (Venezuela)	Mario Tabares; Carlos Claverie	6^{4} 7^{7}	6; 2	6; 3	6; 2
5	(Cuba) (Venezuela)	Juan Pino; Maurice Ruah	6; 1	6; 4

==== Dominican Republic vs. Colombia ====
Dominican Republic
1
Caribbean Tennis Club, Santo Domingo, Dominican Republic
30 March–1 April 1990
Clay

Colombia
4

			1	2	3	4	5
1	(Dominican Republic) (Colombia)	Genaro Deleon; Álvaro Jordan	2; 6	3; 6	2; 6
2	(Dominican Republic) (Colombia)	Rafael Moreno; Mauricio Hadad	3; 6	6; 3	2; 6	6; 2	6; 2
3	(Dominican Republic) (Colombia)	Rafael Moreno / Alexander Schad; Mauricio Hadad / Álvaro Jordan	2; 6	3; 6	4; 6
4	(Dominican Republic) (Colombia)	Genaro Deleon; Mauricio Hadad	2; 6	2; 6	2; 6
5	(Dominican Republic) (Colombia)	Rafael Moreno; Álvaro Jordan	2; 6	3; 6

==== Barbados vs. Bahamas ====
Barbados
4
Paradise Beach Club, Saint Michael, Barbados
30 March–1 April 1990
Clay

Bahamas
1

			1	2	3	4	5
1	(Barbados) (The Bahamas)	Richard Ashby; Roger Smith	7^{7} 6^{5}	6; 3	6; 2
2	(Barbados) (The Bahamas)	Jimmy Tasker; John Farrington	1; 6	2; 6	0; 6
3	(Barbados) (The Bahamas)	Richard Ashby / Bernard Frost; John Farrington / Roger Smith	7; 5	4; 6	4; 6	7^{7} 6^{5}	6; 4
4	(Barbados) (The Bahamas)	Richard Ashby; John Farrington	6; 2	5; 7	6; 4	6; 2
5	(Barbados) (The Bahamas)	Bernard Frost; Sean Cartwright	6; 1	6; 4

=== Third round ===
==== Cuba vs. Ecuador ====
Cuba
4
Hotel de Varadero, Havana, Cuba
15–17 June 1990
Hard

Ecuador
1

			1	2	3	4	5
1	(Cuba) (Ecuador)	Mario Tabares; Andrés Alarcón	6; 1	6; 0	6; 2
2	(Cuba) (Ecuador)	Juan Pino; Giorgio Carneade	6; 0	6; 1	7; 5
3	(Cuba) (Ecuador)	Juan Pino / Mario Tabares; Giorgio Carneade / Ernesto Lingen	6; 4	6^{3} 7^{7}	6; 4	2; 1		retired
4	(Cuba) (Ecuador)	Wilfredo Henry-Torriente; Andrés Alarcón	4; 6	4; 6
5	(Cuba) (Ecuador)	Mario Tabares; Pablo Campana	6; 2	7^{9} 6^{7}

==== Barbados vs. Colombia ====
Barbados
1
Haywoods Resort, Saint Peter, Barbados
15–17 June 1990
Hard

Colombia
4

			1	2	3	4	5
1	(Barbados) (Colombia)	Richard Ashby; Álvaro Jordan	6; 4	3; 6	6^{1} 7^{7}	3; 6
2	(Barbados) (Colombia)	Richard Taylor; Miguel Tobón	7^{9} 6^{7}	0; 6	3; 6	4; 6
3	(Barbados) (Colombia)	Richard Ashby / Bernard Frost; Jaime Cortés / Álvaro Jordan	4; 6	4; 6	4; 6
4	(Barbados) (Colombia)	Richard Taylor; Álvaro Jordan	3; 6	2; 6
5	(Barbados) (Colombia)	Richard Ashby; Miguel Tobón	7^{7} 6^{5}	6; 3

=== Fourth round ===
==== Cuba vs. Colombia ====
Cuba
3
Hotel de Varadero, Havana, Cuba
20–22 July 1990
Hard

Colombia
2

			1	2	3	4	5
1	(Cuba) (Colombia)	Mario Tabares; Miguel Tobón	7; 5	7; 5	6; 4
2	(Cuba) (Colombia)	Juan Pino; Álvaro Jordan	2; 6	6; 3	2; 6	4; 6
3	(Cuba) (Colombia)	Juan Pino / Mario Tabares; Jaime Cortés / Álvaro Jordan	6; 1	7; 5	6; 3
4	(Cuba) (Colombia)	Juan Pino; Miguel Tobón	6; 4	6; 3	3; 6	6; 1
5	(Cuba) (Colombia)	Mario Tabares; Álvaro Jordan	6^{2} 7^{7}	6; 1	10; 12
