= 1993 Davis Cup Americas Zone Group II =

International tennis competition

The Americas Zone was one of the three zones of the regional Davis Cup competition in 1993.

In the Americas Zone there were three different tiers, called groups, in which teams compete against each other to advance to the upper tier. Winners in Group II advanced to the Americas Zone Group I. Teams who lost their respective ties competed in the relegation play-offs, with winning teams remaining in Group II, whereas teams who lost their play-offs were relegated to the Americas Zone Group III in 1994.

== Participating nations ==
- Colombia
- Dominican Republic
- Ecuador
- Haiti
- Paraguay
- Peru
- Puerto Rico
- Venezuela

=== Draw ===
Relegation Play-offs
Bogotá, Colombia (clay)
Dominican Republic	1
Colombia	4
Caracas, Venezuela (clay)
Haiti	2
Venezuela	3

First Round
Santo Domingo, Dominican Rep. (clay)
Paraguay	3
Dominican Republic	2
Lima, Peru (clay)
Colombia	2
Peru	3
Port-au-Prince, Haiti (clay)
Puerto Rico	5
Haiti	0
Guayaquil, Ecuador (clay)
Ecuador	4
Venezuela	1

Second Round
Lima, Peru (clay)
Paraguay	0
Peru	5
Guayaquil, Ecuador (clay)
Puerto Rico	3
Ecuador	2

Third Round
Lima, Peru (clay)
Peru	5
Puerto Rico	0

- Colombia and Haiti relegated to Group III in 1994.
- Peru promoted to Group I in 1994.

== First round ==
=== Dominican Republic vs. Paraguay ===
Dominican Republic
2
Caribbean Tennis Club, Santo Domingo, Dominican Republic
5–7 February 1993
Clay

Paraguay
3

			1	2	3	4	5
1	(Dominican Republic) (Paraguay)	Rafael Moreno; Rubén Alvarenga	6; 1	3; 6	2; 6	4; 6
2	(Dominican Republic) (Paraguay)	Genaro Deleon; Ricardo Mena	6; 4	4; 6	2; 6	1; 6
3	(Dominican Republic) (Paraguay)	Rafael Moreno / Hiram Silfa; Rubén Alvarenga / Ricardo Mena	6; 2	6; 2	6; 3
4	(Dominican Republic) (Paraguay)	Genaro Deleon; Rubén Alvarenga	6; 3	6; 3	7; 5
5	(Dominican Republic) (Paraguay)	Rafael Moreno; Ricardo Mena	0; 6	6; 4	6; 3	6^{1} 7^{7}	3; 6

=== Peru vs. Colombia ===
Peru
3
Club Lawn Tennis de la Exposición, Lima, Peru
5–7 February 1993
Clay

Colombia
2

			1	2	3	4	5
1	(Peru) (Colombia)	Alejandro Aramburú; Mauricio Hadad	4; 6	3; 6	4; 6
2	(Peru) (Colombia)	Jaime Yzaga; Miguel Tobón	6; 4	7; 5	6; 1
3	(Peru) (Colombia)	Carlos di Laura / Jaime Yzaga; Mauricio Hadad / Miguel Tobón	7^{8} 6^{6}	6; 4	1; 6	7; 5
4	(Peru) (Colombia)	Jaime Yzaga; Mauricio Hadad	1; 6	6^{2} 7^{7}	6; 3	6^{10} 7^{12}
5	(Peru) (Colombia)	Alejandro Aramburú; Miguel Tobón	6; 3	5; 7	6; 4	6; 4

=== Haiti vs. Puerto Rico ===
Haiti
0
Cercle Bellevue, Port-au-Prince, Haiti
5–7 February 1993
Clay

Puerto Rico
5

			1	2	3	4	5
1	(Haiti) (Puerto Rico)	Bertrand Lacombe; Miguel Nido	4; 6	2; 6	1; 6
2	(Haiti) (Puerto Rico)	Patrice Baker; Joey Rive	4; 6	6; 3	5; 7	6; 4	3; 6
3	(Haiti) (Puerto Rico)	Patrice Baker / Bertrand Lacombe; Miguel Nido / Joey Rive	6^{6} 7^{8}	7^{9} 6^{7}	5; 7	3; 6
4	(Haiti) (Puerto Rico)	Patrice Baker; Miguel Nido	2; 6	0; 6
5	(Haiti) (Puerto Rico)	Bertrand Lacombe; Jorge F. Gonzalez	3; 6	4; 6

=== Ecuador vs. Venezuela ===
Ecuador
4
Guayaquil Tenis Club, Guayaquil, Ecuador
5–7 February 1993
Clay

Venezuela
1

			1	2	3	4	5
1	(Ecuador) (Venezuela)	Andrés Gómez; Jimy Szymanski	6; 1	6; 4	6; 3
2	(Ecuador) (Venezuela)	Pablo Campana; Maurice Ruah	6; 4	6; 2	6; 2
3	(Ecuador) (Venezuela)	Andrés Gómez / Nicolás Lapentti; Salvador Colvee / Maurice Ruah	4; 6	6^{3} 7^{7}	4; 6
4	(Ecuador) (Venezuela)	Andrés Gómez; Maurice Ruah	6; 1	6; 1	6; 2
5	(Ecuador) (Venezuela)	Pablo Campana; Jimy Szymanski	6; 1	7^{7} 6^{4}

== Second round ==
=== Peru vs. Paraguay ===
Peru
5
Club Lawn Tennis de la Exposición, Lima, Peru
26–28 March 1993
Clay

Paraguay
0

			1	2	3	4	5
1	(Peru) (Paraguay)	Alejandro Aramburú; Rubén Alvarenga	6; 3	6; 4	7^{7} 6^{2}
2	(Peru) (Paraguay)	Jaime Yzaga; Ricardo Mena	7^{7} 6^{4}	4; 6	4; 6	6; 3	7; 5
3	(Peru) (Paraguay)	Carlos di Laura / José Luis Noriega; Rubén Alvarenga / Ricardo Mena	6; 4	6; 4	6; 1
4	(Peru) (Paraguay)	Jaime Yzaga; Rubén Alvarenga	6; 3	4; 6	6; 1
5	(Peru) (Paraguay)	Alejandro Aramburú; Ricardo Mena	5; 7	6; 4	6; 1

=== Ecuador vs. Puerto Rico ===
Ecuador
2
Guayaquil Tenis Club, Guayaquil, Ecuador
26–28 March 1993
Clay

Puerto Rico
3

			1	2	3	4	5
1	(Ecuador) (Puerto Rico)	Andrés Gómez; Joey Rive	6; 2	6; 2	6; 4
2	(Ecuador) (Puerto Rico)	Pablo Campana; Miguel Nido	6; 2	6; 3	1; 6	0; 6	1; 6
3	(Ecuador) (Puerto Rico)	Andrés Gómez / Nicolás Lapentti; Miguel Nido / Joey Rive	6; 3	6; 2	4; 6	4; 6	5; 7
4	(Ecuador) (Puerto Rico)	Andrés Gómez; Miguel Nido	6; 2	6; 2	6; 1
5	(Ecuador) (Puerto Rico)	Luis Morejón; Joey Rive	6; 4	0; 6	3; 6	2; 6

== Relegation play-offs ==
=== Colombia vs. Dominican Republic ===
Colombia
4
América Tenis Club, Bogotá, Colombia
26–28 March 1993
Clay

Dominican Republic
1

			1	2	3	4	5
1	(Colombia) (Dominican Republic)	Miguel Tobón; Hiram Silfa	6; 3	6; 4	6; 3
2	(Colombia) (Dominican Republic)	Mauricio Hadad; Genaro Deleon	6; 4	3; 6	4; 6	6; 3	8; 10
3	(Colombia) (Dominican Republic)	Mauricio Hadad / Miguel Tobón; Rafael Moreno / Hiram Silfa	7^{7} 6^{2}	6; 3	6; 4
4	(Colombia) (Dominican Republic)	Mauricio Hadad; Hiram Silfa	6^{5} 7^{7}	7^{8} 6^{6}	6; 4	6; 1
5	(Colombia) (Dominican Republic)	Miguel Tobón; Genaro Deleon	7^{7} 6^{1}	6; 3

=== Venezuela vs. Haiti ===
Venezuela
3
National Tennis Centre, Caracas, Venezuela
26–28 March 1993
Clay

Haiti
2

			1	2	3	4	5
1	(Venezuela) (Haiti)	Nicolás Pereira; Bertrand Madsen	6; 4	6; 4	7^{7} 6^{3}
2	(Venezuela) (Haiti)	Maurice Ruah; Ronald Agénor	6^{3} 7^{7}	2; 6	0; 6
3	(Venezuela) (Haiti)	Nicolás Pereira / Maurice Ruah; Ronald Agénor / Bertrand Madsen	6; 4	6; 2	6; 0
4	(Venezuela) (Haiti)	Nicolás Pereira; Ronald Agénor	6^{4} 7^{7}	2; 6	2; 6
5	(Venezuela) (Haiti)	Maurice Ruah; Bertrand Madsen	7^{11} 6^{9}	0; 6	7^{9} 6^{7}	6; 2

== Third round ==
=== Peru vs. Puerto Rico ===
Peru
5
Club de Tenis de Concepción, Lima, Peru
16–18 July 1993
Clay

Puerto Rico
0

			1	2	3	4	5
1	(Peru) (Puerto Rico)	Jaime Yzaga; Joey Rive	6; 0	6; 1	6; 2
2	(Peru) (Puerto Rico)	Alejandro Aramburú; Miguel Nido	6; 3	6; 3	6; 2
3	(Peru) (Puerto Rico)	José Luis Noriega / Jaime Yzaga; Miguel Nido / Joey Rive	6; 4	6; 4	7; 5
4	(Peru) (Puerto Rico)	Jaime Yzaga; Miguel Nido	3; 6	7; 5	7; 5
5	(Peru) (Puerto Rico)	Alejandro Aramburú; Joey Rive	6; 4	6; 1
