= 1997 Davis Cup Americas Zone Group II =

International tennis competition

The Americas Zone was one of the three zones of the regional Davis Cup competition in 1997.

In the Americas Zone there were four different tiers, called groups, in which teams compete against each other to advance to the upper tier. Winners in Group II advanced to the Americas Zone Group I. Teams who lost their respective ties competed in the relegation play-offs, with winning teams remaining in Group II, whereas teams who lost their play-offs were relegated to the Americas Zone Group III in 1998.

== Participating nations ==
- Colombia
- Cuba
- El Salvador
- Haiti
- Paraguay
- Puerto Rico
- Peru
- Uruguay

=== Draw ===
Relegation Play-offs
San Juan, Puerto Rico (hard)
Cuba | 4
Puerto Rico | 1
San Salvador, El Salvador (clay)
Haiti | 3
El Salvador | 2

First Round
Havana, Cuba (hard)
Peru | 3
Cuba | 2
San Juan, Puerto Rico (hard)
Puerto Rico | 2
Colombia | 3
Asunción, Paraguay (clay)
Paraguay | 5
Haiti | 0
San Salvador, El Salvador (hard)
El Salvador | 1
Uruguay | 4

Second Round
Cali, Colombia (clay)
Peru | 0
Colombia | 5
Asunción, Paraguay (clay)
Paraguay | 2
Uruguay | 3

Third Round
Bogotá, Colombia (clay)
Colombia | 4
Uruguay | 1

- Puerto Rico and El Salvador relegated to Group III in 1998.
- Colombia promoted to Group I in 1998.

== First round ==
=== Cuba vs. Peru ===
Cuba
2
National Tennis Centre, Havana, Cuba
7–9 February 1997
Hard

Peru
3

| | | | 1 | 2 | 3 | 4 | 5 |
|---|---|---|---|---|---|---|---|---|
| 1 | (Cuba) (Peru) | Lázaro Navarro-Batles; Alejandro Aramburú | 6; 1 | 6; 4 | 6; 2 |
| 2 | (Cuba) (Peru) | Juan Pino; Américo Venero | 4; 6 | 5; 7 | 7; 5 | 3; 6 |
| 3 | (Cuba) (Peru) | Lázaro Navarro-Batles / Juan Pino; Américo Venero / Jaime Yzaga | 4; 6 | 4; 6 | 2; 6 |
| 4 | (Cuba) (Peru) | Juan Pino; Jaime Yzaga | 4; 6 | 7^{7} 6^{4} | 1; 0 | | | retired |
| 5 | (Cuba) (Peru) | Lázaro Navarro-Batles; Américo Venero | 6^{5} 7^{7} | 3; 6 | 7^{7} 6^{5} | 6; 2 | 6; 8 |

=== Puerto Rico vs. Colombia ===
Puerto Rico
2
Parque Central, San Juan, Puerto Rico
7–9 February 1997
Hard

Colombia
3

| | | | 1 | 2 | 3 | 4 | 5 |
|---|---|---|---|---|---|---|---|
| 1 | (Puerto Rico) (Colombia) | Jorge González; Miguel Tobón | 6; 2 | 6; 2 | 4; 6 | 6; 4 |
| 2 | (Puerto Rico) (Colombia) | Rafael Jordan; Mauricio Hadad | 4; 6 | 0; 6 | 7; 5 | 2; 6 |
| 3 | (Puerto Rico) (Colombia) | Ernie Fernández / Jorge González; Mauricio Hadad / Miguel Tobón | 6^{5} 7^{7} | 3; 6 | 4; 6 |
| 4 | (Puerto Rico) (Colombia) | Jorge González; Mauricio Hadad | 3; 6 | 2; 6 | 3; 6 |
| 5 | (Puerto Rico) (Colombia) | Rafael Jordan; Miguel Tobón | 6; 3 | 7^{9} 6^{7} |

=== Paraguay vs. Haiti ===
Paraguay
5
Yacht y Golf Club Paraguayo, Asunción, Paraguay
7–9 February 1997
Clay

Haiti
0

| | | | 1 | 2 | 3 | 4 | 5 |
|---|---|---|---|---|---|---|---|
| 1 | (Paraguay) (Haiti) | Ricardo Mena; Ronald Agénor | 6; 4 | 6; 0 | 6; 2 |
| 2 | (Paraguay) (Haiti) | Ramón Delgado; Bertrand Madsen | 7; 5 | 6; 3 | 6; 1 |
| 3 | (Paraguay) (Haiti) | Ramón Delgado / Ricardo Mena; Ronald Agénor / Bertrand Madsen | 6; 2 | 6; 1 | 3; 6 | 4; 6 | 7; 5 |
| 4 | (Paraguay) (Haiti) | Ramón Delgado; Bertrand Lacombe | 6; 1 | 6; 3 |
| 5 | (Paraguay) (Haiti) | Ricardo Mena; Bertrand Madsen | 6; 2 | 6; 4 |

=== El Salvador vs. Uruguay ===
El Salvador
1
Jardines de La Sabana, San Salvador, El Salvador
7–9 February 1997
Hard

Uruguay
4

| | | | 1 | 2 | 3 | 4 | 5 |
|---|---|---|---|---|---|---|---|---|
| 1 | (El Salvador) (Uruguay) | Manuel Antonio Tejada Ruiz; Federico Dondo | 1; 6 | 1; 6 | 1; 6 |
| 2 | (El Salvador) (Uruguay) | José Baires; Marcelo Filippini | 0; 6 | 5; 7 | 3; 6 |
| 3 | (El Salvador) (Uruguay) | Jorge Méndez / Manuel Antonio Tejada Ruiz; Federico Dondo / Gonzalo Rodríguez | 3; 6 | 6^{4} 7^{7} | 2; 6 |
| 4 | (El Salvador) (Uruguay) | Manuel Antonio Tejada Ruiz; Marcelo Filippini | 3; 1 | | | | | retired |
| 5 | (El Salvador) (Uruguay) | José Baires; Federico Dondo | 3; 6 | 2; 6 |

== Second round ==
=== Colombia vs. Peru ===
Colombia
5
Liga Vallecaucana, Cali, Colombia
4–6 April 1997
Clay

Peru
0

| | | | 1 | 2 | 3 | 4 | 5 |
|---|---|---|---|---|---|---|---|
| 1 | (Colombia) (Peru) | Jaime Cortés; Alejandro Aramburú | 6; 3 | 7; 5 | 7; 5 |
| 2 | (Colombia) (Peru) | Miguel Tobón; Luis Horna | 6^{4} 7^{7} | 6; 4 | 6; 2 | 6; 2 |
| 3 | (Colombia) (Peru) | Mario Rincón / Miguel Tobón; César Reano / Jaime Yzaga | 7; 5 | 6; 3 | 7^{7} 6^{3} |
| 4 | (Colombia) (Peru) | Miguel Tobón; Alejandro Aramburú | 6; 4 | 7^{7} 6^{3} |
| 5 | (Colombia) (Peru) | Eduardo Rincón; Luis Horna | 4; 6 | 6; 4 | 7^{8} 6^{6} |

=== Paraguay vs. Uruguay ===
Paraguay
2
Yacht y Golf Club Paraguayo, Asunción, Paraguay
4–6 April 1997
Clay

Uruguay
3

| | | | 1 | 2 | 3 | 4 | 5 |
|---|---|---|---|---|---|---|---|
| 1 | (Paraguay) (Uruguay) | Ramón Delgado; Federico Dondo | 3; 6 | 6; 2 | 6; 2 | 7; 5 |
| 2 | (Paraguay) (Uruguay) | Ricardo Mena; Marcelo Filippini | 4; 6 | 4; 6 | 4; 6 |
| 3 | (Paraguay) (Uruguay) | Ramón Delgado / Ricardo Mena; Marcelo Filippini / Gonzalo Rodríguez | 6; 3 | 3; 6 | 1; 6 | 2; 6 |
| 4 | (Paraguay) (Uruguay) | Ramón Delgado; Marcelo Filippini | 5; 7 | 6; 4 | 6^{6} 7^{8} | 2; 6 |
| 5 | (Paraguay) (Uruguay) | Ricardo Mena; Federico Dondo | 6; 3 | 7; 5 |

== Relegation play-offs ==
=== Puerto Rico vs. Cuba ===
Puerto Rico
1
Parque Central, San Juan, Puerto Rico
4–6 April 1997
Hard

Cuba
4

| | | | 1 | 2 | 3 | 4 | 5 |
|---|---|---|---|---|---|---|---|
| 1 | (Puerto Rico) (Cuba) | Héctor Nevares; Juan Pino | 1; 6 | 1; 6 | 4; 6 |
| 2 | (Puerto Rico) (Cuba) | Rafael Jordan; Lázaro Navarro-Batles | 4; 6 | 7; 5 | 1; 6 | 6; 3 | 1; 6 |
| 3 | (Puerto Rico) (Cuba) | Ernie Fernández / Rafael Jordan; Lázaro Navarro-Batles / Juan Pino | 6; 3 | 4; 6 | 6; 3 | 4; 6 | 4; 6 |
| 4 | (Puerto Rico) (Cuba) | Ernie Fernández; Jorge Córdova | 2; 6 | 6; 4 | 6; 2 |
| 5 | (Puerto Rico) (Cuba) | Héctor Nevares; Lázaro Navarro-Batles | 4; 6 | 0; 6 |

=== El Salvador vs. Haiti ===
El Salvador
2
Maya Country Club,, San Salvador, El Salvador
4–6 April 1997
Clay

Haiti
3

| | | | 1 | 2 | 3 | 4 | 5 |
|---|---|---|---|---|---|---|---|
| 1 | (El Salvador) (Haiti) | José Baires; Bertrand Madsen | 5; 7 | 3; 6 | 1; 6 |
| 2 | (El Salvador) (Haiti) | Manuel Antonio Tejada Ruiz; Bertrand Lacombe | 7^{7} 6^{4} | 6; 3 | 6; 4 |
| 3 | (El Salvador) (Haiti) | Jorge Méndez / Manuel Antonio Tejada Ruiz; Bertrand Lacombe / Bertrand Madsen | 2; 6 | 4; 6 | 6^{6} 7^{8} |
| 4 | (El Salvador) (Haiti) | Manuel Antonio Tejada Ruiz; Bertrand Madsen | 2; 6 | 6^{4} 7^{7} | 3; 6 |
| 5 | (El Salvador) (Haiti) | José Baires; Rafael Goscinny | 6; 2 | 6; 4 |

== Third round ==
=== Colombia vs. Uruguay ===
Colombia
4
América Tenis Club, Bogotá, Colombia
19–21 September 1997
Clay

Uruguay
1

| | | | 1 | 2 | 3 | 4 | 5 |
|---|---|---|---|---|---|---|---|
| 1 | (Colombia) (Uruguay) | Mario Rincón; Federico Dondo | 5; 7 | 7^{7} 6^{5} | 6; 3 | 6; 0 |
| 2 | (Colombia) (Uruguay) | Miguel Tobón; Marcelo Filippini | 7^{7} 6^{3} | 5; 7 | 7^{7} 6^{5} | 6; 1 |
| 3 | (Colombia) (Uruguay) | Mario Rincón / Miguel Tobón; Marcelo Filippini / Gonzalo Rodríguez | 6; 2 | 6; 3 | 6^{1} 7^{7} | 7; 5 |
| 4 | (Colombia) (Uruguay) | Mario Rincón; Marcelo Filippini | 2; 6 | 2; 6 |
| 5 | (Colombia) (Uruguay) | Philippe Moggio; Federico Dondo | 6; 3 | 6; 4 |
