= 1989 Davis Cup Americas Zone =

International tennis competition

The Americas Zone was one of the three zones of the regional Davis Cup competition in 1989.

In the Americas Zone there were two different tiers, called groups, in which teams competed against each other to advance to the upper tier.

== Group I ==
Winners in Group I advanced to the World Group qualifying round, along with losing teams from the World Group first round. Teams who lost their respective first round ties competed in the relegation play-off, with the winning teams remaining in Group I, whereas the team who lost their play-off was relegated to the Americas Zone Group II in 1990.

=== Participating nations ===
- Argentina
- Brazil
- Canada
- Ecuador
- Peru
- Uruguay

==== Draw ====
First Round; 3–5 February
Brazil
bye
Lima, Peru (clay)
Ecuador	0
Peru	5
Montreal, Canada (indoor carpet)
Canada	4
Uruguay	1
bye
Argentina

Second Round; 7–9 April
Lima, Peru (clay)
Brazil	2
Peru	3
Buenos Aires, Argentina (clay)
Canada	0
Argentina	3

- Peru and Argentina advance to World Group qualifying round.

Relegation Play-off; 7–8 May
Montevideo, Uruguay (clay)
Ecuador	0
Uruguay	3

- Ecuador relegated to Group II in 1990.

=== First round ===
==== Peru vs. Ecuador ====
Peru
5
Club Lawn Tennis de la Exposición, Lima, Peru
3–5 February 1989
Clay

Ecuador
0

			1	2	3	4	5
1	(Peru) (Ecuador)	Jaime Yzaga; Giorgio Carneade	4; 6	6; 0	6; 3	6; 2
2	(Peru) (Ecuador)	Pablo Arraya; Ernesto Lingen	6; 1	3; 6	6; 2	6; 4
3	(Peru) (Ecuador)	Carlos di Laura / Jaime Yzaga; Andrés Alarcón / Giorgio Carneade	6; 3	7^{7} 6^{3}	6; 1
4	(Peru) (Ecuador)	Jaime Yzaga; Ernesto Lingen	6; 0	6; 2
5	(Peru) (Ecuador)	Pablo Arraya; Giorgio Carneade	6; 4	6; 4

==== Canada vs. Uruguay ====
Canada
4
Complexe sportif Claude-Robillard, Montreal, Canada
3–5 February 1989
Carpet (indoors)

Uruguay
1

			1	2	3	4	5
1	(Canada) (Uruguay)	Chris Pridham; Marcelo Filippini	5; 7	6^{6} 7^{8}	6; 4	6; 3	6; 4
2	(Canada) (Uruguay)	Andrew Sznajder; Diego Pérez	6; 3	6; 2	6; 4
3	(Canada) (Uruguay)	Grant Connell / Glenn Michibata; Victor Caldarelli / Diego Pérez	6; 2	6; 4	6; 4
4	(Canada) (Uruguay)	Chris Pridham; Diego Pérez						w/o
5	(Canada) (Uruguay)	Andrew Sznajder; Marcelo Filippini	7^{7} 6^{3}	6^{5} 7^{7}				retired

=== Second round ===
==== Peru vs. Brazil ====
Peru
3
Club Lawn Tennis de la Exposición, Lima, Peru
7–9 April 1989
Clay

Brazil
2

			1	2	3	4	5
1	(Peru) (Brazil)	Jaime Yzaga; Cássio Motta	6; 4	4; 6	4; 6	6; 4	3; 6
2	(Peru) (Brazil)	Alejandro Aramburú; Luiz Mattar	6; 4	2; 6	2; 6	6^{5} 7^{7}
3	(Peru) (Brazil)	Carlos di Laura / Jaime Yzaga; Ricardo Acioly / Danilo Marcelino	6; 3	6; 3	4; 6	6; 4
4	(Peru) (Brazil)	Alejandro Aramburú; Cássio Motta	6; 4	6; 1	2; 6	4; 6	6; 3
5	(Peru) (Brazil)	Jaime Yzaga; Luiz Mattar	6; 2	6; 0	6; 4

==== Argentina vs. Canada ====
Argentina
3
Buenos Aires Lawn Tennis Club, Buenos Aires, Argentina
7–8 April 1989
Clay

Canada
0

			1	2	3	4	5
1	(Argentina) (Canada)	Alberto Mancini; Andrew Sznajder	6; 4	6; 3	6; 3
2	(Argentina) (Canada)	Guillermo Pérez Roldán; Martin Laurendeau	6; 1	6; 4	6; 0
3	(Argentina) (Canada)	José Luis Clerc / Horacio de la Peña; Grant Connell / Glenn Michibata	6; 4	6; 2	3; 6	7^{7} 6^{4}
4	(Argentina) (Canada)	Alberto Mancini; Martin Laurendeau						not played
5	(Argentina) (Canada)	Guillermo Pérez Roldán; Andrew Sznajder						not played

=== Relegation play-off ===
==== Uruguay vs. Ecuador ====
Uruguay
3
Carrasco Lawn Tennis Club, Montevideo, Uruguay
7–8 May 1989
Clay

Ecuador
0

			1	2	3	4	5
1	(Uruguay) (Ecuador)	Marcelo Filippini; Ernesto Lingen	6; 3	6; 3	6; 1
2	(Uruguay) (Ecuador)	Diego Pérez; Giorgio Carneade	6; 2	1; 2				retired
3	(Uruguay) (Ecuador)	Victor Caldarelli / Diego Pérez; Andrés Alarcón / Ernesto Lingen	6; 4	6; 0	6; 2
4	(Uruguay) (Ecuador)	Marcelo Filippini; Giorgio Carneade						not played
5	(Uruguay) (Ecuador)	Diego Pérez; Ernesto Lingen						not played

== Group II ==
The winner in Group II advanced to the Americas Zone Group I in 1990.

=== Participating nations ===
- Bahamas
- Bolivia
- Chile
- Colombia
- Cuba
- Dominican Republic
- Jamaica
- Venezuela

==== Draw ====
First round 3–5 February
Kingston, Jamaica (hard)
Chile	4
Jamaica	1
Bogotá, Colombia (indoor clay)
Cuba	4
Colombia	1
Santo Domingo, Dominican Republic (clay)
Dominican Republic	3
Bolivia	2
Nassau, Bahamas (hard)
Bahamas	5
Venezuela	0

Second round 7–9 April
Havana, Cuba (hard)
Chile	4
Cuba	1
Nassau, Bahamas (hard)
Dominican Republic	0
Bahamas	5

Third round 21–23 July
Nassau, Bahamas (hard)
Chile	4
Bahamas	1

- Chile promoted to Group I in 1990.

=== First round ===
==== Jamaica vs. Chile ====
Jamaica
1
Jamaica Lawn Tennis Association, Kingston, Jamaica
3–5 February 1989
Hard

Chile
4

			1	2	3	4	5
1	(Jamaica) (Chile)	Karl Hale; Ricardo Acuña	7^{7} 6^{4}	6; 4	1; 6	1; 6	3; 6
2	(Jamaica) (Chile)	Doug Burke; Robinson Ureta	3; 6	2; 4				retired
3	(Jamaica) (Chile)	Karl Hale / Noel Rutherford; Ricardo Acuña / Hans Gildemeister	6^{4} 7^{7}	5; 7	7; 5	3; 6
4	(Jamaica) (Chile)	Karl Hale; Robinson Ureta	7; 5	1; 6	8; 6
5	(Jamaica) (Chile)	Noel Rutherford; Ricardo Acuña	6^{12} 7^{14}	1; 6

==== Colombia vs. Cuba ====
Colombia
1
América Tenis Club, Bogotá, Colombia
3–5 February 1989
Clay (indoors)

Cuba
4

			1	2	3	4	5
1	(Colombia) (Cuba)	Jaime Cortés; Mario Tabares	3; 6	7; 5	3; 6	6; 2	2; 6
2	(Colombia) (Cuba)	Miguel Tobón; Juan Pino	5; 7	6; 3	6; 2	6^{4} 7^{7}	3; 6
3	(Colombia) (Cuba)	Hernando Aguirre / Mauricio Hadad; Juan Pino / Mario Tabares	6^{6} 7^{8}	6; 0	6; 2	7; 5
4	(Colombia) (Cuba)	Miguel Tobón; Mario Tabares	6^{6} 7^{8}	3; 6	4; 6
5	(Colombia) (Cuba)	Jaime Cortés; Juan Pino	6^{2} 7^{7}	6; 4	2; 6

==== Dominican Republic vs. Bolivia ====
Dominican Republic
3
Caribbean Tennis Club, Santo Domingo, Dominican Republic
3–5 February 1989
Clay

Bolivia
2

			1	2	3	4	5
1	(Dominican Republic) (Bolivia)	Rafael Moreno; Hrvoje Eterovic	4; 6	6; 2	6; 0	6; 2
2	(Dominican Republic) (Bolivia)	Alexander Schad; Oscar Blacutt	0; 6	3; 6	7^{7} 6^{3}	4; 6
3	(Dominican Republic) (Bolivia)	Rafael Moreno / Marcel Olivares; Oscar Blacutt / Hrvoje Eterovic	3; 6	6; 1	6; 4	6; 4
4	(Dominican Republic) (Bolivia)	Rafael Moreno; Oscar Blacutt	6; 2	6; 1	6; 0
5	(Dominican Republic) (Bolivia)	Alexander Schad; Hrvoje Eterovic	3; 6	5; 7

==== Bahamas vs. Venezuela ====
Bahamas
5
Wyndham Beach Tennis Centre, Nassau, Bahamas
3–5 February 1989
Hard

Venezuela
0

			1	2	3	4	5
1	(The Bahamas) (Venezuela)	Roger Smith; Juan Carlos Bianchi	6; 1	6; 3	6; 4
2	(The Bahamas) (Venezuela)	Mark Knowles; Valerio Boccitto	7^{8} 6^{6}	4; 6	6; 3	6; 2
3	(The Bahamas) (Venezuela)	John Farrington / Roger Smith; Salvador Colvee / Maurice Ruah	7^{7} 6^{3}	6^{5} 7^{7}	7; 5	4; 6	10; 8
4	(The Bahamas) (Venezuela)	Mark Knowles; Juan Carlos Bianchi	6; 3	6; 4
5	(The Bahamas) (Venezuela)	Roger Smith; Valerio Boccitto	6; 3	6; 4

=== Second round ===
==== Cuba vs. Chile ====
Cuba
1
Hotel de Varadero, Havana, Cuba
7–9 April 1989
Hard

Chile
4

			1	2	3	4	5
1	(Cuba) (Chile)	Juan Pino; Ricardo Acuña	5; 7	4; 6	6; 1	1; 6
2	(Cuba) (Chile)	Mario Tabares; Robinson Ureta	2; 6	7^{7} 6^{5}	3; 6	4; 6
3	(Cuba) (Chile)	Juan Pino / Mario Tabares; Ricardo Acuña / Hans Gildemeister	2; 6	4; 6	4; 6
4	(Cuba) (Chile)	Juan Pino; Robinson Ureta	6; 1	6; 4
5	(Cuba) (Chile)	Mario Tabares; Ricardo Acuña	6^{7} 7^{9}	4; 6

==== Bahamas vs. Dominican Republic ====
Bahamas
5
Carnival Crystal Palace, Nassau, Bahamas
7–9 April 1989
Hard

Dominican Republic
0

			1	2	3	4	5
1	(The Bahamas) (Dominican Republic)	Roger Smith; Alexander Schad	7^{7} 6^{3}	6; 0	6; 1
2	(The Bahamas) (Dominican Republic)	Mark Knowles; Rafael Moreno	7^{7} 6^{5}	6; 1	4; 6	6; 2
3	(The Bahamas) (Dominican Republic)	John Farrington / Roger Smith; Rafael Moreno / Marcel Olivares	6; 1	6; 4	7; 5
4	(The Bahamas) (Dominican Republic)	Mark Knowles; Alexander Schad	6; 2	6; 2
5	(The Bahamas) (Dominican Republic)	Roger Smith; Rafael Moreno	6; 2	6; 3

=== Third round ===
==== Bahamas vs. Chile ====
Bahamas
1
Carnival Crystal Palace, Nassau, Bahamas
21–23 July 1989
Hard

Chile
4

			1	2	3	4	5
1	(The Bahamas) (Chile)	Mark Knowles; Robinson Ureta	6; 4	6; 4	6; 0
2	(The Bahamas) (Chile)	John Farrington; José Antonio Fernández	2; 6	3; 6	6; 4	6; 4	2; 6
3	(The Bahamas) (Chile)	John Farrington / Mark Knowles; Hans Gildemeister / Gerardo Vacarezza	4; 6	7^{7} 6^{4}	6^{5} 7^{7}	6^{4} 7^{7}
4	(The Bahamas) (Chile)	Mark Knowles; José Antonio Fernández	0; 6	6^{4} 7^{7}	6; 3	5; 7
5	(The Bahamas) (Chile)	John Antonas; Robinson Ureta	1; 6	3; 6
