= 1998 Davis Cup Americas Zone Group II =

Team in Davis Cup 1998

The Americas Zone was one of the three zones of the regional Davis Cup competition in 1998.

In the Americas Zone there were four different tiers, called groups, in which teams compete against each other to advance to the upper tier. Winners in Group II advanced to the Americas Zone Group I. Teams who lost their respective ties competed in the relegation play-offs, with winning teams remaining in Group II, whereas teams who lost their play-offs were relegated to the Americas Zone Group III in 1999.

== Participating nations ==
- Cuba
- Guatemala
- Haiti
- Jamaica
- Paraguay
- Peru
- Uruguay
- Venezuela

=== Draw ===
Relegation Play-offs
Havana, Cuba (hard)
Guatemala	2
Cuba	3
Asunción, Paraguay (clay)
Jamaica	0
Paraguay	5

First Round
Caracas, Venezuela (hard)
Venezuela	4
Guatemala	1
Port-au-Prince, Haiti (hard)
Haiti	3
Cuba	2
Lima, Peru (clay)
Jamaica	0
Peru	5
Montevideo, Uruguay (clay)
Paraguay	2
Uruguay	3

Second Round
Port-au-Prince, Haiti (clay)
Venezuela	3
Haiti	2
Montevideo, Uruguay (clay)
Peru	1
Uruguay	4

Third Round
Montevideo, Uruguay (clay)
Venezuela	3
Uruguay	2

- Guatemala and Jamaica relegated to Group III in 1999.
- Venezuela promoted to Group I in 1999.

== First round ==
=== Venezuela vs. Guatemala ===
Venezuela
4
National Centre, Caracas, Venezuela
3–5 April 1998
Hard

Guatemala
1

			1	2	3	4	5
1	(Venezuela) (Guatemala)	Jimy Szymanski; Luis Pérez Chete	6; 0	6; 3	6; 4
2	(Venezuela) (Guatemala)	Kepler Orellana; Jacobo Chávez	6; 3	6; 3	6; 4
3	(Venezuela) (Guatemala)	Kepler Orellana / Jimy Szymanski; Daniel Chávez Morales / Luis Valencia	6; 4	6; 2	6; 2
4	(Venezuela) (Guatemala)	José de Armas; Jacobo Chávez	6; 2	6; 0
5	(Venezuela) (Guatemala)	Ricardo Omaña; Luis Pérez Chete	6^{4} 7^{7}	4; 6

=== Haiti vs. Cuba ===
Haiti
3
JOTAC Tennis Academy, Port-au-Prince, Haiti
3–5 April 1998
Hard

Cuba
2

			1	2	3	4	5
1	(Haiti) (Cuba)	Ronald Agénor; Armando Pérez	6; 2	6; 2	6; 0
2	(Haiti) (Cuba)	Bertrand Madsen; Lázaro Navarro-Batles	6^{5} 7^{7}	7^{7} 6^{4}	4; 6	6; 4	3; 6
3	(Haiti) (Cuba)	Ronald Agénor / Jerry Joseph; Lázaro Navarro-Batles / Juan Pino	4; 6	3; 6	6; 2	2; 6
4	(Haiti) (Cuba)	Ronald Agénor; Lázaro Navarro-Batles	6; 2	6; 1	6; 4
5	(Haiti) (Cuba)	Bertrand Madsen; Armando Pérez	6; 3	4; 6	6; 2	6; 2

=== Peru vs. Jamaica ===
Peru
5
Exposición Lawn Tennis Club, Lima, Peru
3–5 April 1998
Clay

Jamaica
0

			1	2	3	4	5
1	(Peru) (Jamaica)	Luis Horna; Jermaine Smith	6; 1	6; 2	7^{8} 6^{6}
2	(Peru) (Jamaica)	Alejandro Aramburú; Karl Hale	6; 4	6; 2	3; 6	6; 3
3	(Peru) (Jamaica)	Luis Horna / Américo Venero; Karl Hale / Nicholas Malcolm	6; 1	6; 3	6; 3
4	(Peru) (Jamaica)	Alejandro Aramburú; Jermaine Smith	6; 1	6; 4
5	(Peru) (Jamaica)	Iván Miranda; Jesse Smatt	6; 3	6; 1

=== Uruguay vs. Paraguay ===
Uruguay
3
Carrasco Lawn Tennis Club, Montevideo, Uruguay
3–5 April 1998
Clay

Paraguay
2

			1	2	3	4	5
1	(Uruguay) (Paraguay)	Federico Dondo; Ramón Delgado	0; 6	3; 6	1; 6
2	(Uruguay) (Paraguay)	Marcelo Filippini; Ricardo Mena	6; 2	6; 1	4; 6	6; 1
3	(Uruguay) (Paraguay)	Marcelo Filippini / Gonzalo Rodríguez; Ramón Delgado / Ricardo Mena	6; 3	6; 3	1; 6	7^{8} 6^{6}
4	(Uruguay) (Paraguay)	Marcelo Filippini; Ramón Delgado	5; 7	6; 3	5; 7	7^{7} 6^{2}	2; 6
5	(Uruguay) (Paraguay)	Federico Dondo; Ricardo Mena	6^{8} 7^{10}	6; 4	6; 2	7^{8} 6^{6}

== Second round ==
=== Haiti vs. Venezuela ===
Haiti
2
Bellevue Tennis Club, Port-au-Prince, Haiti
17–19 July 1998
Clay

Venezuela
3

			1	2	3	4	5
1	(Haiti) (Venezuela)	Ronald Agénor; Kepler Orellana	6; 2	6; 3	7; 5
2	(Haiti) (Venezuela)	Bertrand Madsen; Jimy Szymanski	4; 6	4; 6	1; 6
3	(Haiti) (Venezuela)	Ronald Agénor / Bertrand Madsen; Kepler Orellana / Jimy Szymanski	3; 6	4; 6	6; 4	4; 6
4	(Haiti) (Venezuela)	Ronald Agénor; Jimy Szymanski	7; 5	7^{7} 6^{4}	3; 6	6; 0
5	(Haiti) (Venezuela)	Bertrand Madsen; Kepler Orellana	1; 6	2; 6	2; 6

=== Uruguay vs. Peru ===
Uruguay
4
Carrasco Lawn Tennis Club, Montevideo, Uruguay
17–19 July 1998
Clay

Peru
1

			1	2	3	4	5
1	(Uruguay) (Peru)	Marcelo Filippini; Américo Venero	6^{1} 7^{7}	7; 5	6; 3	6; 0
2	(Uruguay) (Peru)	Federico Dondo; Alejandro Aramburú	6; 4	6; 1	7; 5
3	(Uruguay) (Peru)	Marcelo Filippini / Gonzalo Rodríguez; Iván Miranda / Américo Venero	6; 3	7; 5	6; 3
4	(Uruguay) (Peru)	Alberto Brause; Alejandro Aramburú	3; 6					retired
5	(Uruguay) (Peru)	Federico Dondo; Américo Venero	6; 2	6; 4

== Relegation play-offs ==
=== Cuba vs. Guatemala ===
Cuba
3
National Centre, Havana, Cuba
17–19 July 1998
Hard

Guatemala
2

			1	2	3	4	5
1	(Cuba) (Guatemala)	Lázaro Navarro-Batles; Alexander Lehnhoff	6; 1	6; 4	6; 2
2	(Cuba) (Guatemala)	Juan Pino; Jacobo Chávez	6; 3	6; 3	6^{5} 7^{7}	1; 6	7; 5
3	(Cuba) (Guatemala)	Lázaro Navarro-Batles / Juan Pino; Daniel Chávez Morales / Luis Valencia	6; 4	6; 4	6; 4
4	(Cuba) (Guatemala)	Jorge Catala; Daniel Chávez Morales	6^{5} 7^{7}	2; 6
5	(Cuba) (Guatemala)	Sandor Martínez Breijo; Alexander Lehnhoff	3; 6	7^{9} 6^{7}	1; 6

=== Paraguay vs. Jamaica ===
Paraguay
5
Yacht & Golf Club Paraguayo, Asunción, Paraguay
17–19 July 1998
Clay

Jamaica
0

			1	2	3	4	5
1	(Paraguay) (Jamaica)	Ricardo Mena; Jermaine Smith	6; 3	6; 4	6; 4
2	(Paraguay) (Jamaica)	Ramón Delgado; Karl Hale	6; 0	6; 4	6; 2
3	(Paraguay) (Jamaica)	Ramón Delgado / Ricardo Mena; Karl Hale / Jermaine Smith	3; 6	6; 2	6; 2	6; 1
4	(Paraguay) (Jamaica)	Ramón Delgado; Jermaine Smith	6; 0	6; 2
5	(Paraguay) (Jamaica)	Francisco Rodríguez; Jesse Smatt	6; 3	6; 1

== Third round ==
=== Uruguay vs. Venezuela ===
Uruguay
2
Carrasco Lawn Tennis Club, Montevideo, Uruguay
25–28 September 1998
Clay

Venezuela
3

			1	2	3	4	5
1	(Uruguay) (Venezuela)	Marcelo Filippini; Kepler Orellana	6; 2	6; 3	7; 5
2	(Uruguay) (Venezuela)	Federico Dondo; Jimy Szymanski	6; 2	5; 7	4; 6	1; 6
3	(Uruguay) (Venezuela)	Marcelo Filippini / Gonzalo Rodríguez; Kepler Orellana / Jimy Szymanski	6; 2	6; 2	2; 6	2; 6	4; 6
4	(Uruguay) (Venezuela)	Marcelo Filippini; Jimy Szymanski	6; 3	6^{2} 7^{7}	6; 3	6; 3
5	(Uruguay) (Venezuela)	Federico Dondo; Kepler Orellana	6; 4	2; 6	6; 3	4; 6	1; 6
