= 1994 Davis Cup Americas Zone Group II =

International tennis competition

The Americas Zone was one of the three zones of the regional Davis Cup competition in 1994.

In the Americas Zone, there were three different tiers, called groups, in which teams compete against each other to advance to the upper tier. Winners in Group II advanced to the Americas Zone Group I. Teams who lost their respective ties competed in the relegation play-offs, with winning teams remaining in Group II, whereas teams who lost their play-offs were relegated to the Americas Zone Group III in 1995.

== Participating nations ==
- Canada
- Colombia
- Ecuador
- Guatemala
- Jamaica
- Paraguay
- Puerto Rico
- Venezuela

=== Draw ===
Relegation Play-offs
Guatemala City, Guatemala (hard)
Jamaica	1
Guatemala	4
Asunción, Paraguay (clay)
Paraguay	4
Puerto Rico	1

First Round
Ottawa, Canada (indoor hard)
Canada	5
Jamaica	0
Guatemala City, Guatemala (hard)
Guatemala	0
Colombia	5
Asunción, Paraguay (clay)
Venezuela	4
Paraguay	1
San Juan, Puerto Rico (hard)
Ecuador	4
Puerto Rico	1

Second Round
Bogotá, Colombia (clay)
Canada	3
Colombia	2
Caracas, Venezuela (hard)
Venezuela	4
Ecuador	1

Third Round
Montreal, Canada (hard)
Canada	2
Venezuela	3

- Jamaica and Puerto Rico relegated to Group III in 1995.
- Venezuela promoted to Group I in 1995.

== First round ==
=== Canada vs. Jamaica ===
Canada
5
Ottawa Athletic Club, Ottawa, Canada
4–6 February 1994
Hard (indoors)

Jamaica
0

			1	2	3	4	5
1	(Canada) (Jamaica)	Sébastien Lareau; Doug Burke	7; 5	6; 2	6; 4
2	(Canada) (Jamaica)	Daniel Nestor; Karl Hale	7; 5	6; 3	6; 2
3	(Canada) (Jamaica)	Sébastien Lareau / Daniel Nestor; Doug Burke / Karl Hale	6; 1	6; 1	6; 2
4	(Canada) (Jamaica)	Sébastien Lareau; Karl Hale	6; 1	6; 1
5	(Canada) (Jamaica)	Daniel Nestor; Nicholas Malcolm	6; 0	6; 2

=== Guatemala vs. Colombia ===
Guatemala
0
Ciudad Deportiva, Guatemala City, Guatemala
4–6 February 1994
Hard

Colombia
5

			1	2	3	4	5
1	(Guatemala) (Colombia)	Daniel Chávez Morales; Miguel Tobón	3; 6	5; 7	4; 6
2	(Guatemala) (Colombia)	Jacobo Chávez; Mauricio Hadad	6^{3} 7^{7}	6; 4	3; 6	6; 2	4; 6
3	(Guatemala) (Colombia)	Carlos Chávez / Daniel Chávez Morales; Mauricio Hadad / Miguel Tobón	6; 3	2; 6	4; 6	6; 4	3; 6
4	(Guatemala) (Colombia)	Daniel Chávez Morales; Mauricio Hadad	1; 6	7; 5	4; 6
5	(Guatemala) (Colombia)	Jacobo Chávez; Miguel Tobón	6^{7} 7^{9}	6^{4} 7^{7}

=== Paraguay vs. Venezuela ===
Paraguay
1
Yacht y Golf Club Paraguayo, Asunción, Paraguay
4–6 February 1994
Clay

Venezuela
4

			1	2	3	4	5
1	(Paraguay) (Venezuela)	Ricardo Mena; Jimy Szymanski	3; 6	3; 6	4; 6
2	(Paraguay) (Venezuela)	Rubén Alvarenga; Nicolás Pereira	5; 7	3; 6	3; 6
3	(Paraguay) (Venezuela)	Rubén Alvarenga / Ricardo Mena; Nicolás Pereira / Jimy Szymanski	4; 6	6^{3} 7^{7}	1; 6
4	(Paraguay) (Venezuela)	Ricardo Mena; Nicolás Pereira	4; 6	6; 3	6; 3
5	(Paraguay) (Venezuela)	Rubén Alvarenga; Jimy Szymanski	7; 5	5; 7	5; 7

=== Puerto Rico vs. Ecuador ===
Puerto Rico
1
Parque Central, San Juan, Puerto Rico
4–6 February 1994
Hard

Ecuador
4

			1	2	3	4	5
1	(Puerto Rico) (Ecuador)	Joey Rive; Pablo Campana	4; 6	4; 6	4; 6
2	(Puerto Rico) (Ecuador)	Jorge González; Nicolás Lapentti	2; 6	3; 6	4; 6
3	(Puerto Rico) (Ecuador)	José Frontera / Joey Rive; Pablo Campana / Nicolás Lapentti	6; 4	2; 6	4; 6	7^{9} 6^{7}	2; 6
4	(Puerto Rico) (Ecuador)	Joey Rive; Nicolás Lapentti	6; 3	6; 3
5	(Puerto Rico) (Ecuador)	Jorge González; Pablo Campana	6; 2	5; 7	4; 6

== Second round ==
=== Colombia vs. Canada ===
Colombia
2
Club Campestre El Rancho, Bogotá, Colombia
25–27 March 1994
Clay

Canada
3

			1	2	3	4	5
1	(Colombia) (Canada)	Miguel Tobón; Sébastien Lareau	6^{5} 7^{7}	1; 6	2; 6
2	(Colombia) (Canada)	Mauricio Hadad; Daniel Nestor	0; 6	3; 6	7^{8} 6^{6}	7; 5	6; 2
3	(Colombia) (Canada)	Mauricio Hadad / Miguel Tobón; Sébastien Lareau / Daniel Nestor	6; 4	3; 6	7^{7} 6^{2}	6^{4} 7^{7}	6; 1
4	(Colombia) (Canada)	Mauricio Hadad; Sébastien Lareau	6; 3	4; 6	1; 6	3; 6
5	(Colombia) (Canada)	Miguel Tobón; Daniel Nestor	5; 7	4; 6	3; 6

=== Venezuela vs. Ecuador ===
Venezuela
4
Altamira Tennis Club, Caracas, Venezuela
25–27 March 1994
Hard

Ecuador
1

			1	2	3	4	5
1	(Venezuela) (Ecuador)	Maurice Ruah; Luis Morejón	6; 4	7^{8} 6^{6}	6; 3
2	(Venezuela) (Ecuador)	Nicolás Pereira; Pablo Campana	6; 2	7; 5	7; 5
3	(Venezuela) (Ecuador)	Nicolás Pereira / Maurice Ruah; Pablo Campana / Nicolás Lapentti	6; 2	6; 3	6; 1
4	(Venezuela) (Ecuador)	Maurice Ruah; Pablo Campana	3; 6	7; 5	4; 6
5	(Venezuela) (Ecuador)	Nicolás Pereira; Luis Morejón	6; 3	7; 5

== Relegation play-offs ==
=== Guatemala vs. Jamaica ===
Guatemala
4
Ciudad Deportiva, Guatemala City, Guatemala
25–27 March 1994
Hard

Jamaica
1

			1	2	3	4	5
1	(Guatemala) (Jamaica)	Jacobo Chávez; Nicholas Malcolm	6; 4	6; 4	6; 4
2	(Guatemala) (Jamaica)	Daniel Chávez Morales; Karl Hale	7^{7} 6^{5}	6; 3	6^{4} 7^{7}	6; 4
3	(Guatemala) (Jamaica)	Daniel Chávez Morales / Jacobo Chávez; Doug Burke / Karl Hale	6; 1	4; 6	7^{9} 6^{7}	5; 7	3; 6
4	(Guatemala) (Jamaica)	Jacobo Chávez; Karl Hale	6^{6} 7^{8}	7; 5	6^{5} 7^{7}	6; 4	10; 8
5	(Guatemala) (Jamaica)	Daniel Chávez Morales; Nicholas Malcolm	6; 4	7^{7} 6^{5}

=== Paraguay vs. Puerto Rico ===
Paraguay
4
Yacht y Golf Club Paraguayo, Asunción, Paraguay
25–27 March 1994
Clay

Puerto Rico
1

			1	2	3	4	5
1	(Paraguay) (Puerto Rico)	Ricardo Mena; Jorge González	4; 6	6; 1	6; 1	6^{5} 7^{7}	6; 4
2	(Paraguay) (Puerto Rico)	Ramón Delgado; Joey Rive	3; 6	6; 2	7; 5	6^{3} 7^{7}	6; 1
3	(Paraguay) (Puerto Rico)	Rubén Alvarenga / Ramón Delgado; Jorge González / Joey Rive	5; 7	6; 3	4; 6	6^{3} 7^{7}
4	(Paraguay) (Puerto Rico)	Ricardo Mena; Joey Rive	6^{4} 7^{7}	6; 3	6; 4	6; 1
5	(Paraguay) (Puerto Rico)	Ramón Delgado; Jorge González	7; 5	7; 5

== Third round ==
=== Canada vs. Venezuela ===
Canada
2
Jarry Park Stadium, Montreal, Canada
15–17 July 1994
Hard

Venezuela
3

			1	2	3	4	5
1	(Canada) (Venezuela)	Daniel Nestor; Nicolás Pereira	6^{5} 7^{7}	6; 4	7^{7} 6^{3}	6^{5} 7^{7}	3; 6
2	(Canada) (Venezuela)	Sébastien Lareau; Maurice Ruah	7; 5	6; 0	6; 2
3	(Canada) (Venezuela)	Grant Connell / Sébastien Lareau; Nicolás Pereira / Maurice Ruah	6^{3} 7^{7}	6; 1	7; 5	3; 6	6; 3
4	(Canada) (Venezuela)	Daniel Nestor; Maurice Ruah	3; 6	3; 6	6; 3	4; 6
5	(Canada) (Venezuela)	Sébastien Lareau; Nicolás Pereira	7; 5	3; 6	5; 7	4; 6
