= 1992 Davis Cup Americas Zone Group II =

International tennis competition

The Americas Zone was one of the three zones of the regional Davis Cup competition in 1992.

In the Americas Zone there were three different tiers, called groups, in which teams compete against each other to advance to the upper tier. Winners in Group II advanced to the Americas Zone Group I. Teams who lost their respective ties competed in the relegation play-offs, with winning teams remaining in Group II, whereas teams who lost their play-offs were relegated to the Americas Zone Group III in 1993.

== Participating nations ==
- Bahamas
- Barbados
- Colombia
- Dominican Republic
- Eastern Caribbean
- Ecuador
- Peru
- Venezuela

=== Draw ===
Relegation Play-offs
Basseterre, Saint Kitts and Nevis (hard)
Ecuador	3
Eastern Caribbean	2
Santo Domingo, Dominican Rep. (clay)
Dominican Republic	5
Barbados	0

First Round
Guayaquil, Ecuador (clay)
Peru	3
Ecuador	2
Gros Islet, Saint Lucia (hard)
Eastern Caribbean	1
Bahamas	4
Caracas, Venezuela (clay)
Dominican Republic	0
Venezuela	5
Cali, Colombia (clay)
Barbados	0
Colombia	5

Second Round
Nassau, Bahamas (hard)
Peru	2
Bahamas	3
Cali, Colombia (clay)
Venezuela	3
Colombia	2

Third Round
Caracas, Venezuela (clay)
Bahamas	5
Venezuela	0

- Eastern Caribbean and Barbados relegated to Group III in 1993.
- Bahamas promoted to Group I in 1993.

== First round ==
=== Ecuador vs. Peru ===
Ecuador
2
Guayaquil Tenis Club, Guayaquil, Ecuador
31 January–3 February 1992
Clay

Peru
3

			1	2	3	4	5
1	(Ecuador) (Peru)	Andrés Gómez; Alejandro Aramburú	6; 4	6; 4	6; 0
2	(Ecuador) (Peru)	Luis Morejón; Jaime Yzaga	2; 6	6; 2	1; 6	0; 6
3	(Ecuador) (Peru)	Pablo Campana / Andrés Gómez; Carlos di Laura / Jaime Yzaga	6^{4} 7^{7}	2; 6	6; 1	4; 6
4	(Ecuador) (Peru)	Andrés Gómez; Jaime Yzaga	6; 2	6; 2	6; 3
5	(Ecuador) (Peru)	Luis Morejón; Alejandro Aramburú	6; 3	4; 6	2; 6	1; 6

=== Eastern Caribbean vs. Bahamas ===
Eastern Caribbean
1
Saint Lucia Tennis Club, Cap Estate, Gros Islet, Saint Lucia
31 January–2 February 1992
Hard

Bahamas
4

			1	2	3	4	5
1	(Eastern Caribbean) (The Bahamas)	Gavaskar Williams; Roger Smith	1; 6	7; 5	1; 6	1; 6
2	(Eastern Caribbean) (The Bahamas)	Vernon Lewis; John Farrington	6; 3	1; 6	0; 6	7^{7} 6^{2}	6; 2
3	(Eastern Caribbean) (The Bahamas)	John Maginley / Gavaskar Williams; John Farrington / Roger Smith	4; 6	6; 3	6^{3} 7^{7}	3; 6
4	(Eastern Caribbean) (The Bahamas)	Vernon Lewis; Roger Smith	6; 2	4; 6	0; 6	6; 2	2; 6
5	(Eastern Caribbean) (The Bahamas)	Gavaskar Williams; John Farrington	3; 6	4; 6

=== Venezuela vs. Dominican Republic ===
Venezuela
5
National Tennis Centre, Caracas, Venezuela
31 January–2 February 1992
Clay

Dominican Republic
0

			1	2	3	4	5
1	(Venezuela) (Dominican Republic)	Maurice Ruah; Genaro Deleon	0; 6	7; 5	6; 3	6; 1
2	(Venezuela) (Dominican Republic)	Nicolás Pereira; Rafael Moreno	6; 2	6^{2} 7^{7}	6; 2	6; 1
3	(Venezuela) (Dominican Republic)	Alfonso Mora / Nicolás Pereira; Rafael Moreno / Marcel Olivares	6; 2	6; 2	6; 2
4	(Venezuela) (Dominican Republic)	Nicolás Pereira; Genaro Deleon	4; 6	5; 5				retired
5	(Venezuela) (Dominican Republic)	Maurice Ruah; Rafael Moreno	6; 0	6; 0

=== Colombia vs. Barbados ===
Colombia
5
Clube Desportivo de Canas Gordas, Cali, Colombia
31 January–2 February 1992
Clay

Barbados
0

			1	2	3	4	5
1	(Colombia) (Barbados)	Jaime Cortés; Craig Smith	6; 2	6; 1	6; 0
2	(Colombia) (Barbados)	Álvaro Jordan; Richard Ashby	7^{10} 6^{8}	6; 3	6; 2
3	(Colombia) (Barbados)	Álvaro Jordan / Miguel Tobón; Richard Ashby / Bernard Frost	6; 2	7; 5	6; 2
4	(Colombia) (Barbados)	Jaime Cortés; Richard Ashby	6; 2	7^{7} 6^{3}
5	(Colombia) (Barbados)	Álvaro Jordan; Craig Smith	6; 2	6; 2

== Second round ==
=== Bahamas vs. Peru ===
Bahamas
3
Carnival Crystal Palace, Nassau, Bahamas
27–29 March 1992
Hard

Peru
2

			1	2	3	4	5
1	(The Bahamas) (Peru)	Roger Smith; Jaime Yzaga	6^{4} 7^{7}	7^{9} 6^{7}	6; 3	3; 6	4; 6
2	(The Bahamas) (Peru)	Mark Knowles; Carlos di Laura	6; 4	6; 4	6; 2
3	(The Bahamas) (Peru)	Mark Knowles / Roger Smith; Carlos di Laura / Jaime Yzaga	6; 3	6; 2	6; 3
4	(The Bahamas) (Peru)	Mark Knowles; Jaime Yzaga	7^{7} 6^{3}	3; 6	6^{2} 7^{7}	5; 6		retired
5	(The Bahamas) (Peru)	Roger Smith; Carlos di Laura	6; 3	6; 1	6; 3

=== Colombia vs. Venezuela ===
Colombia
2
Clube Desportivo de Canas Gordas, Cali, Colombia
27–29 March 1992
Clay

Venezuela
3

			1	2	3	4	5
1	(Colombia) (Venezuela)	Jaime Cortés; Maurice Ruah	6; 1	6; 3	4; 6	6; 2
2	(Colombia) (Venezuela)	Álvaro Jordan; Nicolás Pereira	2; 6	6; 4	2; 6	2; 6
3	(Colombia) (Venezuela)	Álvaro Jordan / Miguel Tobón; Alfonso Mora / Nicolás Pereira	6; 1	6; 4	6^{2} 7^{7}	6; 3
4	(Colombia) (Venezuela)	Jaime Cortés; Nicolás Pereira	4; 6	4; 6	6; 3	3; 6
5	(Colombia) (Venezuela)	Álvaro Jordan; Maurice Ruah	6; 3	6^{1} 7^{7}	6; 3	6^{5} 7^{7}	4; 6

== Relegation play-offs ==
=== Eastern Caribbean vs. Ecuador ===
Eastern Caribbean
2
Warner Park Sporting Complex, Basseterre, Saint Kitts and Nevis
27–29 March 1992
Hard

Ecuador
3

			1	2	3	4	5
1	(Eastern Caribbean) (Ecuador)	Gavaskar Williams; Pablo Campana	3; 6	4; 6	0; 6
2	(Eastern Caribbean) (Ecuador)	Vernon Lewis; Ernesto Lingen	6; 2	2; 6	7^{7} 6^{2}	6; 3
3	(Eastern Caribbean) (Ecuador)	Vernon Lewis / John Maginley; Pablo Campana / Hugo Núñez	3; 6	5; 7	4; 6
4	(Eastern Caribbean) (Ecuador)	Vernon Lewis; Pablo Campana	1; 6	6^{4} 7^{7}	2; 6
5	(Eastern Caribbean) (Ecuador)	Gavaskar Williams; Ernesto Lingen	6^{7} 7^{9}	6; 3	8; 6

=== Dominican Republic vs. Barbados ===
Dominican Republic
5
Caribbean Tennis Club, Santo Domingo, Dominican Republic
27–29 March 1992
Clay

Barbados
0

			1	2	3	4	5
1	(Dominican Republic) (Barbados)	Genaro Deleon; Lionel Eli	6; 1	6; 2	6; 4
2	(Dominican Republic) (Barbados)	Rafael Moreno; Richard Ashby	5; 7	5; 7	6; 0	6; 4	6; 1
3	(Dominican Republic) (Barbados)	Genaro Deleon / Rafael Moreno; Richard Ashby / Bernard Frost	6; 4	6; 3	7; 5
4	(Dominican Republic) (Barbados)	Genaro Deleon; Richard Ashby	6; 3	6; 4
5	(Dominican Republic) (Barbados)	Rafael Moreno; Lionel Eli	6; 4	6; 0

== Third round ==
=== Venezuela vs. Bahamas ===
Venezuela
0
National Tennis Centre, Caracas, Venezuela
17–19 July 1992
Clay

Bahamas
5

			1	2	3	4	5
1	(Venezuela) (The Bahamas)	Maurice Ruah; Roger Smith	2; 6	3; 6	1; 6
2	(Venezuela) (The Bahamas)	Nicolás Pereira; Mark Knowles	2; 6	3; 6	4; 6
3	(Venezuela) (The Bahamas)	Nicolás Pereira / Maurice Ruah; Mark Knowles / Roger Smith	4; 6	7^{7} 6^{5}	5; 7	3; 6
4	(Venezuela) (The Bahamas)	Jimy Szymanski; Roger Smith	7^{7} 6^{3}	0; 6	2; 6
5	(Venezuela) (The Bahamas)	Maurice Ruah; Mark Knowles	3; 6	6; 4	4; 6
