= 1992 Davis Cup Americas Zone =

International tennis competition

The Americas Zone was one of the three zones of the regional Davis Cup competition in 1992.

In the Americas Zone there were three different tiers, called groups, in which teams competed against each other to advance to the upper tier.

== Group I ==
Winners in Group I advanced to the World Group qualifying round, along with losing teams from the World Group first round. Teams who lost their respective first-round ties were relegated to the Americas Zone Group II in 1993.

=== Participating nations ===
- Chile
- Cuba
- Mexico
- Paraguay
- Uruguay

==== Draw ====
First Round; 31 January–2 February
Asunción, Paraguay (clay)
Paraguay | 1
Cuba | 4

Second Round; 27–29 March
Santiago, Chile (clay)
Chile | 1
Cuba | 4
Montevideo, Uruguay (clay)
Uruguay | 3
Mexico | 2

- Cuba and Uruguay advance to World Group qualifying round.
- Paraguay relegated to Group II in 1993.

=== First round ===
==== Paraguay vs. Cuba ====
Paraguay
1
Yacht y Golf Club Paraguayo, Asunción, Paraguay
31 January–2 February 1992
Clay

Cuba
4

| | | | 1 | 2 | 3 | 4 | 5 |
|---|---|---|---|---|---|---|---|
| 1 | (Paraguay) (Cuba) | Ricardo Mena; Mario Tabares | 6; 3 | 4; 6 | 4; 6 | 6; 4 | 9; 11 |
| 2 | (Paraguay) (Cuba) | Rubén Alvarenga; Juan Pino | 6; 1 | 5; 7 | 4; 6 | 4; 6 |
| 3 | (Paraguay) (Cuba) | Ricardo Mena / Christian de los Ríos; Juan Pino / Mario Tabares | 3; 6 | 3; 6 | 4; 6 |
| 4 | (Paraguay) (Cuba) | Rubén Alvarenga; Mario Tabares | 1; 6 | 6; 3 | 3; 6 |
| 5 | (Paraguay) (Cuba) | Ricardo Mena; Juan Pino | 7; 5 | 6; 3 |

=== Second round ===
==== Chile vs. Cuba ====
Chile
1
Estadio Palestino, Santiago, Chile
27–29 March 1992
Clay

Cuba
4

| | | | 1 | 2 | 3 | 4 | 5 |
|---|---|---|---|---|---|---|---|
| 1 | (Chile) (Cuba) | Felipe Rivera; Juan Pino | 6; 3 | 6; 4 | 7^{7} 6^{1} |
| 2 | (Chile) (Cuba) | Pedro Rebolledo; Mario Tabares | 4; 6 | 2; 6 | 6; 3 | 1; 6 |
| 3 | (Chile) (Cuba) | Juan Pablo Queirolo / Felipe Rivera; Juan Pino / Mario Tabares | 7; 5 | 6^{1} 7^{7} | 3; 6 | 5; 7 |
| 4 | (Chile) (Cuba) | Felipe Rivera; Mario Tabares | 3; 6 | 6; 4 | 4; 6 | 5; 7 |
| 5 | (Chile) (Cuba) | Pedro Rebolledo; Juan Pino | 1; 6 | 6; 3 | 9; 11 |

==== Uruguay vs. Mexico ====
Uruguay
3
Carrasco Lawn Tennis Club, Montevideo, Uruguay
27–29 March 1992
Clay

Mexico
2

| | | | 1 | 2 | 3 | 4 | 5 |
|---|---|---|---|---|---|---|---|
| 1 | (Uruguay) (Mexico) | Marcelo Filippini; Oliver Fernández | 7; 5 | 6; 2 | 6; 2 |
| 2 | (Uruguay) (Mexico) | Diego Pérez; Leonardo Lavalle | 6^{1} 7^{7} | 6; 2 | 6^{1} 7^{7} | 6^{4} 7^{7} |
| 3 | (Uruguay) (Mexico) | Marcelo Filippini / Diego Pérez; Leonardo Lavalle / Jorge Lozano | 6; 1 | 6; 4 | 1; 6 | 6; 3 |
| 4 | (Uruguay) (Mexico) | Marcelo Filippini; Leonardo Lavalle | 6; 3 | 7^{7} 6^{3} | 6; 3 |
| 5 | (Uruguay) (Mexico) | Diego Pérez; Oliver Fernández | 2; 6 | 5; 7 |

== Group II ==
Winners in Group II advanced to the Americas Zone Group I. Teams who lost their respective ties competed in the relegation play-offs, with winning teams remaining in Group II, whereas teams who lost their play-offs were relegated to the Americas Zone Group III in 1993.

=== Participating nations ===
- Bahamas
- Barbados
- Colombia
- Dominican Republic
- Eastern Caribbean
- Ecuador
- Peru
- Venezuela

==== Draw ====
Relegation Play-offs
Basseterre, Saint Kitts and Nevis (hard)
Ecuador | 3
Eastern Caribbean | 2
Santo Domingo, Dominican Rep. (clay)
Dominican Republic | 5
Barbados | 0

First Round
Guayaquil, Ecuador (clay)
Peru | 3
Ecuador | 2
Gros Islet, Saint Lucia (hard)
Eastern Caribbean | 1
Bahamas | 4
Caracas, Venezuela (clay)
Dominican Republic | 0
Venezuela | 5
Cali, Colombia (clay)
Barbados | 0
Colombia | 5

Second Round
Nassau, Bahamas (hard)
Peru | 2
Bahamas | 3
Cali, Colombia (clay)
Venezuela | 3
Colombia | 2

Third Round
Caracas, Venezuela (clay)
Bahamas | 5
Venezuela | 0

- Eastern Caribbean and Barbados relegated to Group III in 1993.
- Bahamas promoted to Group I in 1993.

== Group III ==
Winners in Group III advanced to the Americas Zone Group II in 1993. All other teams remained in Group III.

- Venue: Maya Country Club, San Salvador, El Salvador
- Date: 19–22 March

=== Participating countries ===
- Bolivia
- Costa Rica
- El Salvador
- Guatemala
- Haiti
- Jamaica
- Puerto Rico
- Trinidad and Tobago

==== Draw ====
- Venue: Maya Country Club, San Salvador, El Salvador
- Date: 19–22 March

Group A

| | PUR | ESA | JAM | BOL | RR; W–L | Match; W–L | Set; W–L | Standings |
| Puerto Rico | | 3–0 | 2–1 | 3–0 | 3–0 | 8–1 (89%) | 17–2 (89%) | 1 |
| El Salvador | 0–3 | | 3–0 | 3–0 | 2–1 | 6–3 (67%) | 12–7 (63%) | 2 |
| Jamaica | 1–2 | 0–3 | | 3–0 | 1–2 | 4–5 (45%) | 9–12 (43%) | 3 |
| Bolivia | 0–3 | 0–3 | 0–3 | | 0–3 | 0–9 (0%) | 1–18 (5%) | 4 |

Group B

| | HAI | CRC | GUA | TRI | RR; W–L | Match; W–L | Set; W–L | Standings |
| Haiti | | 2–1 | 3–0 | 3–0 | 3–0 | 8–1 (89%) | 15–5 (75%) | 1 |
| Costa Rica | 1–2 | | 3–0 | 3–0 | 2–1 | 7–2 (78%) | 14–5 (74%) | 2 |
| Guatemala | 0–3 | 0–3 | | 2–1 | 1–2 | 2–7 (22%) | 8–13 (38%) | 3 |
| Trinidad and Tobago | 0–3 | 0–3 | 1–2 | | 0–3 | 1–8 (11%) | 3–17 (15%) | 4 |

- Puerto Rico and Haiti promoted to Group II in 1993.
