= Lázaro Navarro =

Cuban-Mexican tennis player

- Full name: Lázaro Navarro-Batles
- Country (sports): Cuba; Mexico
- Born: 28 January 1974 (age 51)
- Plays: Right-handed
- Prize money: $46,644

Singles
- Career record: 16–6 (Davis Cup)
- Career titles: 0 Challenger 6 Futures
- Highest ranking: No. 327 (28 January 2002)

Doubles
- Career record: 9–8 (Davis Cup)
- Career titles: 0 Challenger 7 Futures
- Highest ranking: No. 372 (13 March 2000)
Medal record
Representing Cuba
Central American and Caribbean Games
Gold medal – first place	1998 Maracaibo	Men's team
Bronze medal – third place	1998 Maracaibo	Men's singles
Bronze medal – third place	1998 Maracaibo	Men's doubles
- Last updated on: 15 June 2021.

Lázaro Navarro-Batles (born 28 January 1974) is a Cuban-Mexican former professional tennis player.

== Biography ==
Navarro grew up in Cuba and didn't take up the sport tennis of until age 13. He played Davis Cup for his native country from 1995 to 2003, appearing in a total of 19 ties. A three-time medalist at the 1998 Central American and Caribbean Games in Maracaibo, he went on to represent Cuba at both the 1999 and 2003 editions of the Pan American Games.

Since 1999 he has been based in Mexico, after coming to the Central American country from Cuba on a sports exchange program. Married to a local from Jalisco, Navarro became a naturalized Mexican and represented his adoptive country in his final years on tour.

While competing on the professional tour he had a career high singles ranking of 327 in the world. His best performance on the ATP Challenger Tour was a run to the semi-finals at Guadalajara in 2001, with wins over Fernando González, Adrián García and Luis Morejón. He won six singles and seven doubles titles on the ITF Men's Circuit.

== ITF Futures finals ==
=== Singles: 9 (6–3) ===
Legend ITF Futures (6–3)	Finals by surface Hard (6–1) Clay (0–2) Grass (0–0) Carpet (0–0)

Result	W–L	Date	Tournament	Tier	Surface	Opponent	Score
Win	1–0	Jun 1999	Mexico F3, Cancún	Futures	Hard	(Brazil) Leonardo Silva	6–4, 6–4
Win	2–0	May 2001	Mexico F5, Cancún	Futures	Hard	(Mexico) Miguel Gallardo Valles	7–5, 4–6, 7–6^{(7–5)}
Loss	2–1	Sep 2001	Mexico F6, Guadalajara	Futures	Clay	(Argentina) Matías Boeker	6–4, 1–6, 2–6
Win	3–1	Sep 2001	Mexico F8, Mazatlán	Futures	Hard	(United States) Rafael De Mesa	3–6, 6–3, 6–4
Win	4–1	Oct 2002	Cuba F1, Havana	Futures	Hard	(France) Charles-Edouard Maria	5–0 ret.
Loss	4–2	Nov 2002	Mexico F18, León	Futures	Hard	(Federal Republic of Yugoslavia) Janko Tipsarević	1–6, 3–6
Loss	4–3	May 2006	Mexico F7, San Javier	Futures	Clay	(Moldova) Roman Borvanov	5–7, 2–6
Win	5–3	Jul 2006	Mexico F9, Mexico City	Futures	Hard	(Mexico) Bruno Rodríguez	4–6, 6–3, 6–4
Win	6–3	Jul 2006	Mexico F10, Comitán	Futures	Hard	(Mexico) Víctor Romero	6–1, 6–0

=== Doubles: 14 (7–7) ===
Legend ITF Futures (7–7)	Finals by surface Hard (5–5) Clay (2–2) Grass (0–0) Carpet (0–0)

Result	W–L	Date	Tournament	Tier	Surface	Partner	Opponents	Score
Win	1–0	Oct 1998	Bolivia F2, Cochabamba	Futures	Clay	(Togo) Jean-Kome Loglo	(Brazil) Marcos Daniel (Brazil) Rodrigo Monte	5–7, 6–4, 7–5
Loss	1–1	May 1999	Mexico F1, Campeche	Futures	Hard	(Cuba) Juan-Antonio Pino-Perez	(France) Cedric Kauffmann (United States) Mike Mather	2–6, 5–7
Win	2–1	Jun 1999	Mexico F3, Cancún	Futures	Hard	(Cuba) Juan-Antonio Pino-Perez	(Argentina) Rodrigo Pena (United States) Rudy Rake	2–6, 6–4, 6–2
Win	3–1	Sep 1999	Peru F1, Arequipa	Futures	Clay	(Paraguay) Paulo Carvallo	(Brazil) Leandro Rosa (Lebanon) Jicham Zaatini	walkover
Loss	3–2	Oct 2000	Jamaica F3, Negril	Futures	Hard	(Cuba) Sandor Martinez-Breijo	(Sweden) Johan Kareld (Sweden) Johan Örtegren	5–7, 2–6
Win	4–2	Sep 2001	Mexico F8, Mazatlán	Futures	Hard	(United States) Marcus Fluitt	(United States) Doug Root (New Zealand) James Shortall	6–4, 6–4
Loss	4–3	Nov 2001	Mexico F10, Juarez	Futures	Clay	(Mexico) Marcello Amador	(Republic of Ireland) John Doran (Australia) Andrew Painter	3–6, 6–7^{(4–7)}
Win	5–3	Nov 2001	Mexico F12, Zacatecas	Futures	Hard	(Cuba) Sandor Martinez-Breijo	(Mexico) Alejandro Hernández (Germany) Alexander Waske	walkover
Loss	5–4	Mar 2002	Mexico F3, Aguascalientes	Futures	Clay	(Argentina) Juan Pablo Brzezicki	(Mexico) Bruno Echagaray (Mexico) Santiago González	4–6, 5–7
Win	6–4	Jun 2002	Mexico F11, Cancún	Futures	Hard	(Argentina) Sebastián Decoud	(United States) Francisco Montana (United States) Alex Bogomolov Jr.	walkover
Loss	6–5	Sep 2002	Mexico F14, Mazatlán	Futures	Hard	(Cuba) Sandor Martinez-Breijo	(Chile) Hermes Gamonal (Chile) Phillip Harboe	4–6, 6–7^{(5–7)}
Loss	6–6	Feb 2006	Mexico F2, Mexico City	Futures	Hard	(United States) Shane La Porte	(United States) Nathaniel Schnugg (United States) Scott Schnugg	6–7^{(2–7)}, 6–7^{(4–7)}
Win	7–6	Jul 2006	Mexico F9, Mexico City	Futures	Hard	(United States) Michael Johnson	(Mexico) Miguel Ángel Reyes-Varela (Mexico) Bruno Rodríguez	6–4, 4–6, 6–2
Loss	7–7	Aug 2014	Mexico F10, Puebla	Futures	Hard	(Mexico) Adrián Fernández	(Mexico) Hans Hach (Australia) Chris Letcher	3–6, 4–6
