= José Antonio Fernández (tennis) =

Chilean tennis player

- Country (sports): Chile
- Born: 26 January 1965 (age 60) Santiago, Chile
- Height: 5 ft 7 in (170 cm)
- Plays: Right-handed
- Prize money: $36,058

Singles
- Career record: 7–8 (ATP Tour & Davis Cup)
- Highest ranking: No. 202 (29 April 1991)

Grand Slam singles results
- Wimbledon: Q1 (1981)

Doubles
- Career record: 0–2 (ATP Tour)
- Highest ranking: No. 335 (14 October 1985)

Grand Slam doubles results
- Wimbledon: Q1 (1981)

José Antonio Fernández (born 26 January 1965) is a Chilean former professional tennis player.

Fernández is the son of Carmen Ibarra and nephew of Patricio Cornejo, both noted international tennis players.

A 1979 Orange Bowl champion (in the 14s), Fernández turned professional the following year and competed through the 1980s and into the early 1990s. He had a career high singles ranking of 202 in the world and featured in qualifiers at the 1981 Wimbledon Championships. At his peak he competed regularly on the ATP Challenger Tour, with a final appearance at Salerno in 1989, but he also made four main draw appearances on the ATP Tour/Grand Prix circuits.

Fernández represented Chile in six Davis Cup ties between 1985 and 1991, finishing with a 7/4 singles record.

Previously based in Germany for many years, Fernández had worked as a tennis coach since retiring and had involvement in coaching Steffi Graf. He is now living in Florida, where he runs a high performance sports coaching company called SPORTmind INC.

== See also ==
- List of Chile Davis Cup team representatives
