= Pablo Campana =

Ecuadorian tennis player, political figure, entrepreneur

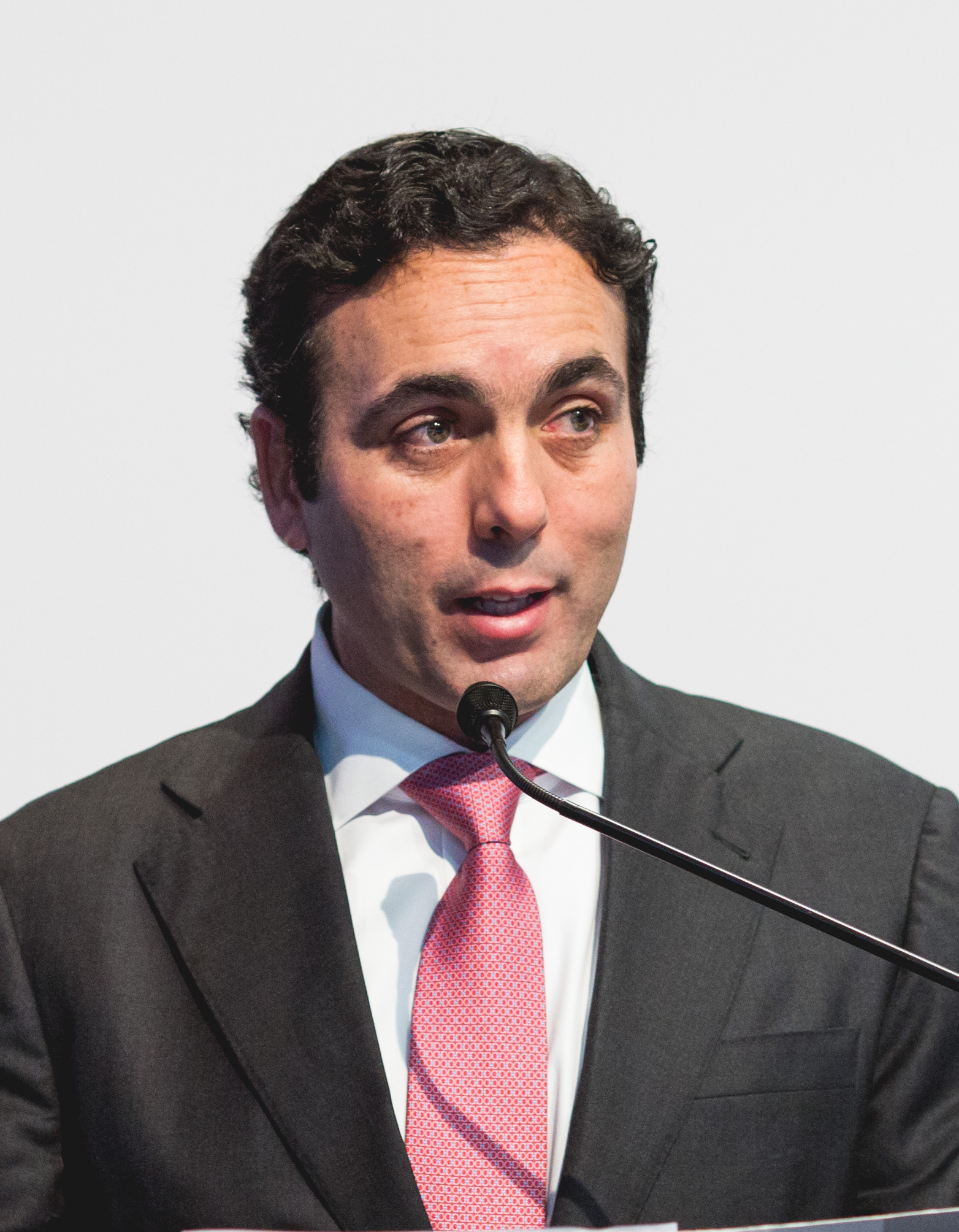

Minister of Foreign Trade and Investment
- In office 24 May 2017 – 19 June 2019
- President: Lenín Moreno
- Preceded by: Juan Carlos Cassinelli
- Succeeded by: Ivan Ontaneda

Pablo Campana
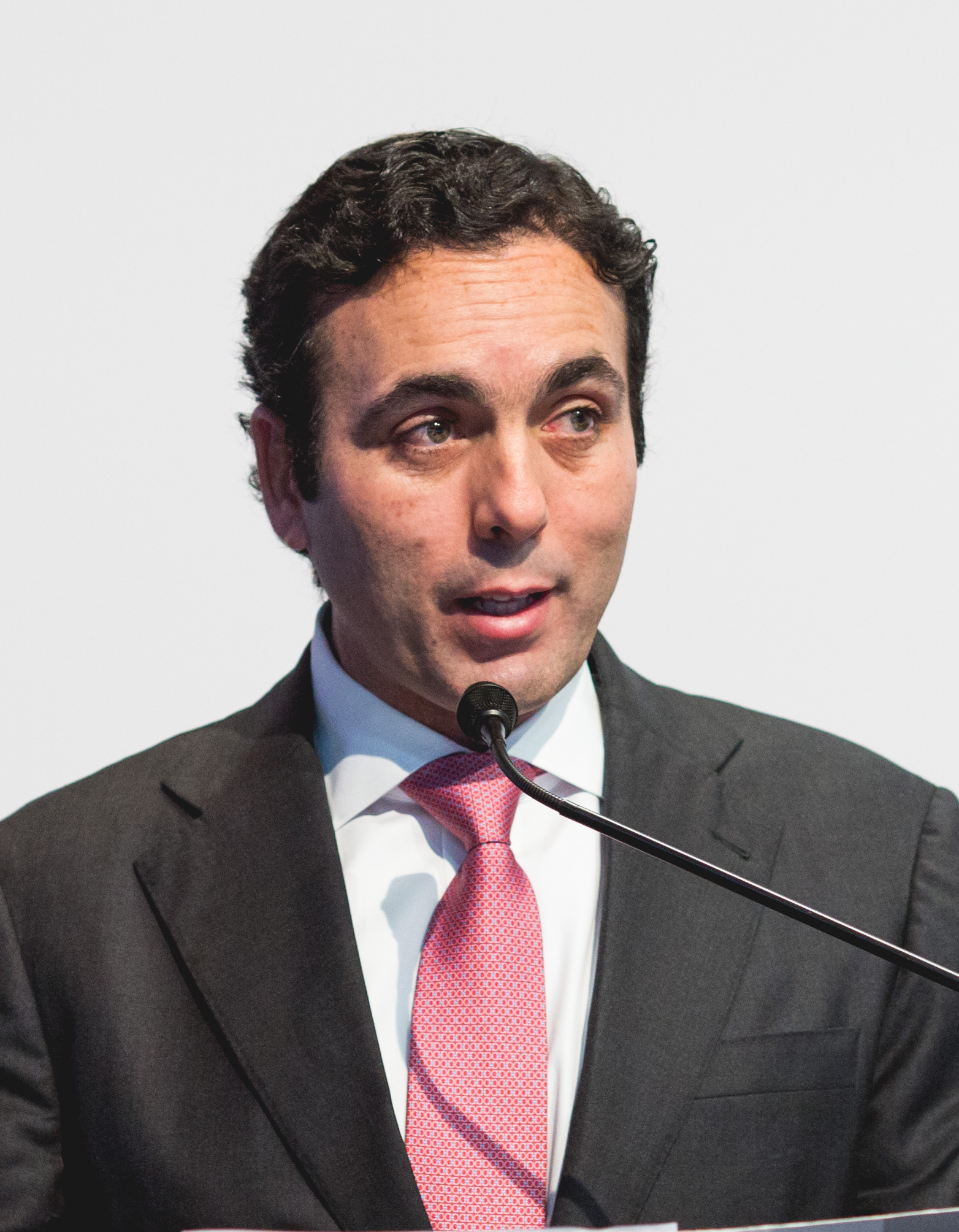
- Country (sports): Ecuador
- Residence: Guayaquil, Ecuador
- Born: 16 December 1972 (age 52); Quito, Ecuador
- Height: 1.80 m (5 ft 11 in)
- Turned pro: 1990
- Plays: Mano Cambiada
- Prize money: US$87,437

Singles
- Career record: 9–7
- Career titles: 0
- Highest ranking: No. 165 (9 September 1996)

Grand Slam singles results
- Australian Open: DNP
- French Open: Q1 (1996)
- Wimbledon: Q1 (1992, 1993, 1994)
- US Open: 3R (1996)

Doubles
- Career record: 8–5
- Career titles: 0
- Highest ranking: No. 162 (23 September 1996)

Pablo Campana (born 16 December 1972 in Quito, Ecuador) is an Ecuadorian entrepreneur, former Minister of Foreign Trade and Investment, and former male tennis player from Ecuador.

He has held various positions in Consorcio Nobis, and is currently CEO and founder of Millenium S.A.

== Tennis career ==
Campana represented his native country in the doubles competition at the 1996 Summer Olympics in Atlanta, partnering Nicolás Lapentti. The pair was eliminated in the second round there.

The left-hander Campana represented Ecuador in the Davis Cup from 1990 to 1997, posting an 11–4 record in singles and a 7–2 record in doubles in fourteen ties played.

Campana's highest ranking in singles was world No. 165, which he reached on 9 September 1996. His highest doubles ranking was World No. 162, which he reached on 23 September 1996.

In early 1997, at 24 years of age, and after learning he was going to become a father, he retired from professional tennis.

== Personal life ==
Campana's son, Leonardo Campana, is a professional footballer. He is also a citizen of the United States.

=== Career finals ===
Legend (singles)
Grand Slam (0–0)
Tennis Masters Cup (0–0)
ATP Masters Series (0–0)
ATP Tour (0–0)
Challengers (1–1)

Result	No.	Date	Tournament	Surface	Opponent	Score
Win	1.	15 July 1996	Quito, Ecuador	Clay	(Ecuador) Luis Morejón	6–3, 6–2
Loss	1.	12 August 1996	Bronx, U.S.	Hard	(Egypt) Tamer El-Sawy	1–6, 4–6

== See also ==
- List of Ecuadorian Ironman
