= Rubén Alvarenga =

Paraguayan tennis player

- Country (sports): Paraguay
- Born: 29 August 1972 (age 53)

Singles
- Career record: 1–12 (Davis Cup)
- Highest ranking: No. 417 (11 November 1991)

Grand Slam singles results
- Wimbledon: Q2 (1995)

Doubles
- Career record: 0–6 (Davis Cup)
- Highest ranking: No. 289 (11 July 1994)

Grand Slam doubles results
- Wimbledon: Q1 (1995)

Rubén Alvarenga (born 29 August 1972) is a Paraguayan former professional tennis player.

Alvarenga was a junior Banana Bowl winner and made the fourth round of the boys' singles at the 1989 French Open.

From 1989 to 1995, Alvarenga appeared in nine Davis Cup ties for Paraguay. He played in a combined 19 singles and doubles rubbers for only one win. This came in one of his 13 singles matches, against Rafael Moreno of the Dominican Republic in 1993, which helped secure a 3–2 win in the tie.

In 1995 he featured in the qualifying draw for the Wimbledon Championships.
