= Bertrand Madsen =

Haitian tennis player

- Country (sports): Haiti
- Born: 18 May 1972 (age 53)
- Plays: Right-handed
- Prize money: $39,485

Singles
- Career record: 5–12
- Career titles: 0
- Highest ranking: No. 246 (18 Nov 1991)

Grand Slam singles results
- US Open: 1R (1991)

Doubles
- Career record: 2–4
- Career titles: 0
- Highest ranking: No. 191 (22 Jun 1992)

Bertrand Madsen (born 18 May 1972) is a former professional tennis player from Haiti.

== Career ==
Madsen was a quarter-finalist in the boys' singles event at the 1990 French Open.

After leaving the junior circuit, Madsen started out competing in the ATP Challenger Series, but in 1991 managed to qualify for the US Open. He was beaten in the first round by Todd Woodbridge. Later in the year he won a doubles title at the Challenger tournament in Casablanca.

Madsen played in a total of 27 Davis Cup ties for his country during his career, which is a national record. He won 33 matches out of 57, with a 22/17 record in singles and an 11/7 record in doubles rubbers.

== Challenger titles ==
=== Doubles: (1) ===
No.	Year	Tournament	Surface	Partner	Opponents	Score
1.	1991	Casablanca, Morocco	Clay	(Germany) Marc-Kevin Goellner	(France) Tarik Benhabiles (Argentina) Gustavo Garetto	6–0, 6–2
