= Miguel Tobón =

Colombian tennis player

- Country (sports): Colombia
- Residence: Bogotá
- Born: 22 June 1968 (age 58) Medellín, Colombia
- Height: 1.85 m (6 ft 1 in)
- Turned pro: 1989
- Retired: 2001
- Plays: Right-handed
- Prize money: $125,127

Singles
- Career record: 18–20
- Career titles: 0
- Highest ranking: No. 205 (22 April 1996)

Grand Slam singles results
- French Open: Q1 (1994)
- Wimbledon: Q2 (1993)
- US Open: Q2 (1995, 1996)

Doubles
- Career record: 13–13
- Career titles: 0
- Highest ranking: No. 295 (25 July 1994)

Miguel Tobón (born 22 June 1968) is a former professional tennis player from Colombia. He completed his education in the United States. He was the captain of the Colombian Davis Cup team.

== Personal life ==
His son Miguel Tobón Jr. (born 2006) is also a professional tennis player. His brother Omar Tobón is a tennis coach in Medellín.

== Career ==
Tobón was a semifinalist at the Bancolombia Open in 1994. The Colombian did better the following year, defeating three top 100 players, Javier Frana, Karim Alami and Fernando Meligeni, en route to the final. He won the first set of the final, against Nicolás Lapentti, but lost the match.

From 1987 to 2001, Tobón took part in a record 23 ties for the Colombia Davis Cup team. He played in 50 rubbers, of which he won 24. His 12 doubles wins is a national record, shared with Mauricio Hadad. Tobón was chosen to serve on the Davis Cup team as a captain, for a second time in 2011, by Federación Colombiana de Tenis.

== ATP career finals ==
=== Singles: 1 (1 loss) ===
Result	W/L	Date	Tournament	Surface	Opponent	Score
Loss	0–1	Sep 1995	Bogotá, Colombia	Clay	(Ecuador) Nicolás Lapentti	6–2, 1–6, 4–6

== Challenger titles ==
=== Doubles: (1) ===
No.	Year	Tournament	Surface	Partner	Opponents	Score
1.	1993	Bogotá, Colombia	Clay	(Colombia) Mauricio Hadad	(Ecuador) Nicolás Lapentti (Ecuador) Luis Morejón	6–3, 6–3
