= Rafael Moreno (tennis) =

Dominican Republic tennis player

- Country (sports): Dominican Republic
- Born: 16 July 1960 (age 64); Santo Domingo, D.R.
- Plays: Right-handed
Medal record
Pan American Games
Bronze medal – third place	1991 Havana	Mixed doubles
Central American and Caribbean Games
Gold medal – first place	1986 Santiago	Men's singles
Silver medal – second place	1982 Havana	Mixed doubles
Silver medal – second place	1986 Santiago	Mixed doubles
Bronze medal – third place	1986 Santiago	Men's doubles
Bronze medal – third place	1990 Mexico City	Mixed doubles

Rafael Moreno (born 16 July 1960) is a Dominican Republic former professional tennis player. He is a member of the Dominican Sports Hall of Fame.

Born in Santo Domingo, Moreno was the singles champion at the 1986 Central American and Caribbean Games in Santiago. This was the first ever tennis gold medal achieved by a Dominican player at the Central American and Caribbean Games. He was also the first male from his country to win a tennis medal at the Pan American Games, when in 1991 he teamed up with the singles silver medalist Joelle Schad for a bronze medal in the mixed doubles.

Moreno competed in 10 Davis Cup ties for the Dominican Republic from 1989 to 1993, winning nine singles and four doubles rubbers. His best win was a five-set triumph over Mauricio Hadad of Colombia. In 1996 he began a 25-year tenure as Davis Cup team captain, which included taking the team to a World Group Playoff against Germany in 2015. He retired from the position of Davis Cup captain in 2020.
