= Cuba Davis Cup team =

National tennis team

Cuba
- Captain: Wilfredo HENRY-TORRIENTE
- ITF ranking: 89
- Colors: Red and Blue
- First year: 1924
- Years played: 45
- Ties played (W–L): 86 (36–50)
- Years in World Group: 1 (0–1)
- Best finish: WG 1st Round (1993)
- Most total wins: Juan Pino (34–29)
- Most singles wins: Juan Pino (21–27)
- Most doubles wins: Sandor Martínez-Breijo (18–8)
- Best doubles team: Juan Pino / Mario Tabares (7–8)
- Most ties played: Sandor Martinez-Breijo (29)
- Most years played: Juan Pino (13)

The Cuba men's national tennis team represents Cuba in Davis Cup tennis competition and are governed by the Federación Cubana de Tenis de Campo.

Cuba currently competes in the Americas Zone Group III. They played in the World Group in 1993.

== History ==
Cuba competed in its first Davis Cup in 1924.

== Current team (2022) ==
- Osviel Turino
- Osmel Rivera Granja
- Yoan Pérez
- Dayron Zúñiga

== See also ==
- Davis Cup
- Cuba Billie Jean King Cup team
