= Juan Pino =

Cuban tennis player (born 1965)

- Full name: Juan Antonio Pino Pérez
- Country (sports): Cuba
- Born: 3 July 1965 (age 60) Pinar del Río, Cuba
- Height: 1.85 m (6 ft 1 in)
- Plays: Right-handed
- Prize money: $31,225

Singles
- Career record: 11-14 (at ATP Tour level, Grand Slam level, and in Davis Cup)
- Career titles: 0; 0 Challenger, 0 Futures
- Highest ranking: No. 199 (3 February 1997)

Doubles
- Career record: 4-14 (at ATP Tour level, Grand Slam level, and in Davis Cup)
- Career titles: 0; 1 Challenger, 1 Futures
- Highest ranking: No. 170 (11 June 1990)
Pan American Games
Bronze medal – third place	1987 Indianapolis	Mixed
Bronze medal – third place	1991 Havana	Singles
Bronze medal – third place	1991 Havana	Doubles
Bronze medal – third place	1991 Havana	Team
Bronze medal – third place	1995 Mar del Plata	Mixed
- Last updated on: 5 April 2026.

Juan Antonio Pino Pérez (born 3 July 1965) is a Cuban former professional tennis player.

== Biography ==
Pino, who comes from Pinar del Río in western Cuba, began playing tennis at the age of 10 and trained in Havana.

A right handed player, Pino holds the record for most matches won for the Cuba Davis Cup team, a total of 34, in a career spanning 12-years from 1987 to 1999.

His 26 ties for Cuba includes World Group participation in 1993, which was Cuba's first ever appearance in the main competition, having qualified through the expulsion of the Yugoslav team due to the Bosnian War. Cuba's debut World Group fixture came against Sweden in Kalmar and Pino was picked to play Stefan Edberg in the first rubber. Pino was beaten comfortably by Edberg and also lost a dead rubber to Nicklas Kulti, as Sweden won all matches in the tie. The Cubans then travelled to Saint Petersburg for a relegation play-off against Russia, in which they were again soundly defeated by the more experienced team. Pino lost his two singles matches, to Andrei Cherkasov and Yevgeny Kafelnikov.

In addition to his Davis Cup career, Pino also represented Cuba regularly at the Pan American Games. He won five medals at three separate games, three of which came at the 1991 Pan American Games in the Cuban capital.

During his professional career he made the main draw of four Grand Prix/ATP tour tournaments, all as a doubles player. He twice reached singles finals on the Challenger tour, the first in 1989 where he was runner-up to Daniel Orsanic in Goiânia and the other a loss to Roberto Jabali at Bogota in 1996, during which he had an opening round win over Franco Squillari. His one Challenger title came in doubles, the Viña del Mar tournament in 1991, with regular doubles partner Mario Tabares.

== ATP Challenger and ITF Futures finals ==
=== Singles: 2 (0–2) ===
Legend ATP Challenger (0–2) ITF Futures (0–0)	Finals by surface Hard (0–0) Clay (0–2) Grass (0–0) Carpet (0–0)

Result	W–L	Date	Tournament	Tier	Surface	Opponent	Score
Loss	0–1	Aug 1989	Goiânia, Brazil	Challenger	Clay	(Argentina) Daniel Orsanic	1–6, 6–3, 3–6
Loss	0–2	Jun 1996	Bogotá, Colombia	Challenger	Clay	(Brazil) Roberto Jabali	7–6, 4–6, 1–6

=== Doubles: 4 (2–2) ===
Legend ATP Challenger (1–1) ITF Futures (1–1)	Finals by surface Hard (1–1) Clay (1–1) Grass (0–0) Carpet (0–0)

Result	W–L	Date	Tournament	Tier	Surface	Partner	Opponents	Score
Loss	0–1	Dec 1989	São Paulo, Brazil	Challenger	Clay	(United States) Mario Tabares	(Brazil) Luiz Mattar (Brazil) Cassio Motta	5–7, 2–6
Win	1–1	Jan 1991	Viña del Mar, Chile	Challenger	Clay	(United States) Mario Tabares	(Argentina) Gabriel Markus (Argentina) Francisco Yunis	6–3, 6–2
Loss	1–2	May 1999	Mexico F1, Campeche	Futures	Hard	(Mexico) Lazaro Navarro Batles	(France) Cedric Kauffmann (United States) Mike Mather	2–6, 5–7
Win	2–2	Jun 1999	Mexico F3, Cancún	Futures	Hard	(Mexico) Lazaro Navarro Batles	(Argentina) Rodrigo Pena (Peru) Rodolfo Rake	2–6, 6–4, 6–2
