= Haiti Davis Cup team =

National tennis team

Haiti
- Nations Ranking: 118 ▼3
- Colors: Red & Blue
- First year: 1988
- Years played: 24
- Ties played (W–L): 78 (41–37)
- Most total wins: Ronald Agénor (39–9)
- Most singles wins: Ronald Agénor (39–9)
- Most doubles wins: Joel Allen (13–15)
- Best doubles team: Ronald Agénor / Patrice Baker (5–1); Joel Allen / Olivier Sajous (5–4)
- Most ties played: Joel Allen (31)
- Most years played: Bertrand Madsen (12)

The Haiti Davis Cup team represents Haiti in Davis Cup tennis competition and are governed by the Fédération Haïtienne de Tennis. They have not competed since 2013.

Haiti currently compete in the Americas Zone of Group III. They reached the Group II semifinals twice in 1990 and 1998.

== History ==
Haiti competed in its first Davis Cup in 1988.

== Current team (2025) ==
- Christopher Bogelin
- James Adler Germinal
- Max Laurore
- Jayven Jean-Baptiste

== See also ==
- Davis Cup
- Haiti Billie Jean King Cup team
