= Alejandro Aramburú =

Peruvian tennis player

- Country (sports): Peru
- Born: 14 February 1969 (age 57) Lima, Peru
- Height: 1.75 m (5 ft 9 in)
- Plays: Right-handed
- Prize money: $143,267

Singles
- Career record: 14–26
- Career titles: 0
- Highest ranking: No. 141 (7 Aug 1989)

Grand Slam singles results
- French Open: 1R (1993)

Doubles
- Career record: 0–4
- Career titles: 0
- Highest ranking: No. 319 (17 Aug 1998)

Alejandro Aramburú Acuña (born 14 February 1969) is a former professional tennis player from Peru.

Aramburú had a strong junior career, culminating in a ranking of number two in the world in 1987, when he won nine junior titles, including the South American Championships. He also reached the semi-finals of the boys' singles at the 1987 French Open and was a quarter-finalist in the Orange Bowl that year.

The Peruvian had his best result on the Grand Prix circuit in 1989, when he made the semi-finals in Bari. He played one Grand Slam, the 1993 French Open, where he was beaten in the first round by Swiss right-hander Jakob Hlasek.

He took part in 16 Davis Cup ties for Peru and won 12 of his 26 rubbers, which were all in singles.

He is the father of the singer Alejandro Aramburú, who is a member of the Latin boy band Santos Bravos.
