= Mauricio Hadad =

Colombian tennis player (born 1971)

- Country (sports): Colombia
- Born: 7 December 1971 (age 54) Cali, Colombia
- Height: 5 ft 7 in (170 cm)
- Turned pro: 1988
- Plays: Right-handed (one-handed backhand)
- Prize money: $523,801

Singles
- Career record: 62–52
- Career titles: 1
- Highest ranking: No. 78 (11 September 1995)

Grand Slam singles results
- Australian Open: 3R (1996)
- French Open: 1R (1996)
- Wimbledon: 1R (1994)
- US Open: 3R (1995)

Doubles
- Career record: 12–8
- Career titles: 0
- Highest ranking: No. 223 (22 April 1991)

Grand Slam doubles results
- Wimbledon: Q3 (1994)
- Last updated on: 13 February 2022.

Mauricio Hadad (born 7 December 1971) is a former tennis player from Colombia. He is the only Colombian tennis player in history to have won an ATP Tour singles title. His best performance at a Grand Slam came at the 1996 Australian Open and the 1995 U.S. Open where he made it to the third round. He was the captain of the Colombia Davis Cup Team from 2013 until 2016.

== Career ==
The right-hander turned pro in 1988 and reached his highest individual ranking on the ATP Tour on September 11, 1995, when he became world No. 78. He won the ATP Bermuda Open in 1995.

Hadad participated in 20 Davis Cup ties for Colombia from 1989 to 2001 and holds the record for most wins with 35 victories, posting a 23–5 record in singles and a 12–6 record in doubles. Hadad had also been the last Colombian player in history to break into the top 100 in 1995 until Alejandro Falla did so in 2007.

He became the captain of the Colombia Davis Cup Team from 2013 until 2016. He has been credited with opening ground to the best generation of Colombian tennis players such as Alejandra Falla, Santiago Giraldo, Alejandro González, Robert Farah and Juan Sebastián Cabal.

=== Coaching career ===
Hadad coached former world No. 1 Russian professional tennis player Maria Sharapova leading her to her first Wimbledon title in 2004 at the age of 17. He also coached Heather Watson leading her to her first title and was the coach of British tennis player Laura Robson until 2016.

== Personal information ==
Hadad is of Lebanese background.

== ATP career finals ==
=== Singles: 2 (1 title, 1 runner-up) ===
Legend Grand Slam Tournaments (0–0) ATP World Tour Finals (0–0) ATP Masters Series (0–0) ATP Championship Series (0–0) ATP World Series (1–1)	Finals by surface Hard (0–0) Clay (1–1) Grass (0–0) Carpet (0–0)	Finals by setting Outdoors (1–1) Indoors (0–0)

Result	W–L	Date	Tournament	Tier	Surface	Opponent	Score
Loss	0–1	Sep 1994	Bogotá, Colombia	World Series	Clay	(Venezuela) Nicolás Pereira	3–6, 6–3, 4–6
Win	1–1	Apr 1995	Paget, Bermuda	World Series	Clay	(Argentina) Javier Frana	7–6^{(7–5)}, 3–6, 6–4

=== Doubles: 1 (1 runner-up) ===
Legend Grand Slam Tournaments (0–0) ATP World Tour Finals (0–0) ATP Masters Series (0–0) ATP Championship Series (0–0) ATP World Series (0–1)	Finals by surface Hard (0–0) Clay (0–1) Grass (0–0) Carpet (0–0)	Finals by setting Outdoors (0–1) Indoors (0–0)

Result	W–L	Date	Tournament	Tier	Surface	Partner	Opponents	Score
Loss	0–1	Mar 2000	Bogotá, Colombia	World Series	Clay	(Spain) Joan Balcells	(Argentina) Pablo Albano (Argentina) Lucas Arnold Ker	6–7^{(4–7)}, 6–1, 2–6

== ATP Challenger and ITF Futures finals ==
=== Singles: 17 (13–4) ===
Legend ATP Challenger (10–2) ITF Futures (3–2)	Finals by surface Hard (1–0) Clay (12–4) Grass (0–0) Carpet (0–0)

Result	W–L	Date	Tournament	Tier	Surface	Opponent	Score
Win	1–0	Oct 1989	Bogotá, Colombia	Challenger	Clay	(Argentina) Guillermo Minutella	6–3, 6–7, 6–4
Win	2–0	Jul 1992	Seville, Spain	Challenger	Clay	(Denmark) Kenneth Carlsen	6–7, 6–3, 6–3
Loss	2–1	Aug 1992	Lins, Brazil	Challenger	Clay	(Austria) Gilbert Schaller	3–6, 3–6
Win	3–1	Oct 1992	Cali, Colombia	Challenger	Clay	(Italy) Mario Visconti	6–1, 6–2
Loss	3–2	Feb 1993	Viña del Mar, Chile	Challenger	Clay	(Argentina) Marcelo Ingaramo	1–6, 4–6
Win	4–2	Sep 1993	Bogotá, Colombia	Challenger	Clay	(Chile) Sergio Cortés	2–6, 6–3, 6–0
Win	5–2	Oct 1993	Cali, Colombia	Challenger	Clay	(Venezuela) Nicolás Pereira	7–6, 7–6
Win	6–2	Oct 1993	Caracas, Venezuela	Challenger	Hard	(United States) Alex O'Brien	7–5, 6–4
Win	7–2	May 1994	Bogotá, Colombia	Challenger	Clay	(Portugal) Nuno Marques	6–3, 6–3
Win	8–2	May 1994	Cali, Colombia	Challenger	Clay	(Peru) Jose-Luis Noriega	6–2, 6–2
Win	9–2	Jun 1996	Medellín, Colombia	Challenger	Clay	(Brazil) Jaime Oncins	2–6, 6–3, 6–1
Win	10–2	Jun 1996	Cali, Colombia	Challenger	Clay	(Germany) Marcello Craca	6–3, 7–6
Loss	10–3	Apr 2000	Chile F4, Santiago	Futures	Clay	(Argentina) Sergio Roitman	4–6, 3–6
Win	11–3	May 2000	Chile F5, Santiago	Futures	Clay	(France) Nicolas Devilder	6–2, 6–2
Loss	11–4	May 2000	USA F13, Boca Raton	Futures	Clay	(Belgium) Kris Goossens	3–6, 5–7
Win	12–4	Oct 2000	Colombia F1, Bogotá	Futures	Clay	(Italy) Leonardo Azzaro	6–2, 7–5
Win	13–4	Oct 2000	Colombia F2, Bogotá	Futures	Clay	(Italy) Leonardo Azzaro	6–1, 4–2 ret.

=== Doubles: 6 (5–1) ===
Legend ATP Challenger (4–1) ITF Futures (1–0)	Finals by surface Hard (1–0) Clay (4–1) Grass (0–0) Carpet (0–0)

Result	W–L	Date	Tournament	Tier	Surface	Partner	Opponents	Score
Win	1–0	Sep 1990	Bogotá, Colombia	Challenger	Clay	(Colombia) Mario Rincón	(Venezuela) Carlos Claverie (United States) Greg Failla	7–6, 7–6
Win	2–0	Mar 1991	San Luis Potosí, Mexico	Challenger	Clay	(Argentina) Daniel Orsanic	(United States) Scott Patridge (United States) Kenny Thorne	6–4, 3–6, 6–3
Win	3–0	Sep 1993	Bogotá, Colombia	Challenger	Clay	(Colombia) Miguel Tobón	(Ecuador) Nicolás Lapentti (Ecuador) Luis Morejón	6–3, 6–3
Loss	3–1	May 1998	Medellín, Colombia	Challenger	Clay	(Colombia) Juan-Camilo Gamboa	(Brazil) Adriano Ferreira (Brazil) Cristiano Testa	6–3, 1–6, 2–6
Win	4–1	Mar 2000	Salinas, Ecuador	Challenger	Hard	(Spain) Joan Balcells	(Spain) Emilio Benfele Álvarez (Ecuador) Álex Calatrava	walkover
Win	5–1	Jun 2000	USA F14, Tampa	Futures	Clay	(Mexico) Enrique Abaroa	(United States) Mitty Arnold (United States) James Blake	6–1, 7–6^{(7–2)}

== Performance timeline ==
Key
W	F	SF	QF	#R	RR	Q#	DNQ	A	NH

(W) winner; (F) finalist; (SF) semifinalist; (QF) quarterfinalist; (#R) rounds 4, 3, 2, 1; (RR) round-robin stage; (Q#) qualification round; (DNQ) did not qualify; (A) absent; (NH) not held; (SR) strike rate (events won / competed); (W–L) win–loss record.

=== Singles ===
Tournament	1992	1993	1994	1995	1996	SR	W–L	Win %
Grand Slam tournaments
Australian Open	A	A	A	A	3R	0 / 1	2–1	67%
French Open	A	A	A	A	1R	0 / 1	0–1	0%
Wimbledon	Q3	Q1	1R	A	A	0 / 1	0–1	0%
US Open	A	A	1R	3R	1R	0 / 3	2–3	40%
Win–loss	0–0	0–0	0–2	2–1	2–3	0 / 6	4–6	40%
ATP Tour Masters 1000
Indian Wells	A	A	Q1	A	A	0 / 0	0–0	–
Miami	A	Q1	1R	1R	1R	0 / 3	0–3	0%
Canada	A	2R	1R	3R	1R	0 / 4	3–4	43%
Cincinnati	A	A	Q1	A	A	0 / 0	0–0	–
Win–loss	0–0	1–1	0–2	2–2	0–2	0 / 7	3–7	30%
