= Ricardo Mena =

Paraguayan tennis player

- Country (sports): Paraguay
- Born: 22 December 1971 (age 53)
- Plays: Right-handed
- Prize money: $10,516

Singles
- Highest ranking: No. 279 (12 Dec 1994)

Grand Slam singles results
- US Open: Q1 (1994)

Doubles
- Highest ranking: No. 360 (15 May 1995)

Ricardo Mena (born 22 December 1971) is a Paraguayan former professional tennis player.

Mena, who had a best singles world ranking of 279, played Davis Cup for Paraguay from 1990 to 1998, then appeared in further ties in 2003 and 2008. During his Davis Cup career he won a total of 19 rubbers for his country. He also played collegiate tennis for Flagler College in Florida, where he was a three-time NAIA All-American.

== ATP Challenger finals ==
=== Doubles: 1 (0–1) ===
Result	Date	Tournament	Surface	Partner	Opponents	Score
Loss	Sep 1994	Natal, Brazil	Clay	(Argentina) Gastón Etlis	(Brazil) Otávio Della (Brazil) Marcelo Saliola	4–6, 3–6
