= Venezuela Davis Cup team =

National sports team

The Venezuela national tennis team represents Venezuela in Davis Cup tennis competition and are governed by the Venezuelan Tennis Federation, known in Spanish as Federación Venezolana de Tenis.

Venezuela currently compete in the Americas Zone Group I. They have never competed in the World Group, but reached the Play-offs in 1995 and 2002.

== History ==
Venezuela competed in its first Davis Cup in 1957.

== Current team (2023) ==
- Ricardo Rodríguez-Pace
- Juan José Bianchi
- Rafael Abdul Salam
- Ignacio Martinez

== See also ==
- Davis Cup
- Venezuela Billie Jean King Cup team
