= Luis Morejón =

Ecuadorian tennis player (born 1973)

- Full name: Luis Adrian Morejón
- Country (sports): Ecuador
- Residence: Aventura, Florida, U.S.
- Born: 28 March 1973 (age 52) Guayaquil, Ecuador
- Height: 1.78 m (5 ft 10 in)
- Turned pro: 1991
- Retired: 2003
- Plays: Right-handed
- Prize money: $ 247,814

Singles
- Career record: 24–39
- Career titles: 0
- Highest ranking: No. 122 (24 June 1996)

Grand Slam singles results
- Australian Open: Q3 (1999)
- French Open: Q2 (1996, 1997, 1998, 1999)
- Wimbledon: Q1 (2000)
- US Open: Q2 (1996)

Other tournaments
- Olympic Games: 1R (1996)

Doubles
- Career record: 3–6
- Career titles: 0
- Highest ranking: No. 220 (18 July 1994)

Luis Adrián Morejón (born 28 March 1973) is a former tennis player from Ecuador who turned professional in 1991. He represented his native country at the 1996 Summer Olympics in Atlanta, Georgia, where he was defeated in the first round by Uruguay's Marcelo Filippini. The right-hander reached his highest singles ATP ranking on 24 June 1996, when he became the number 122 in the world.
