= 1987 Davis Cup Americas Zone =

International tennis competition

The Americas Zone was one of the three regional zones of the 1987 Davis Cup.

11 teams entered the Americas Zone in total, with the winner promoted to the following year's World Group. Brazil defeated Ecuador in the final and qualified for the 1988 World Group.

== Participating nations ==
- Brazil
- Bolivia
- Canada
- Caribbean/West Indies
- Chile
- Colombia
- Cuba
- Ecuador
- Peru
- Uruguay
- Venezuela

=== Draw ===
First round 30 January–1 February
Ecuador
bye
bye
Bolivia
Peru
bye
Caracas, Venezuela (hard)
Venezuela	1
Canada	4
Bogotá, Colombia (clay)
Uruguay	5
Colombia	0
bye
Brazil
Nassau, Bahamas (clay)
Caribbean/West Indies	3
Cuba	2
bye
Chile

Quarterfinals; 13–15 March
Guayaquil, Ecuador (clay)
Ecuador	5
Bolivia	0
Lima, Peru (clay)
Peru	2
Canada	3
Montevideo, Uruguay (indoor clay)
Uruguay	2
Brazil	3
Nassau, Bahamas (hard)
Caribbean/West Indies	2
Chile	3

Semifinals; 24–27 July
Edmonton, Canada (hard)
Ecuador	3
Canada	2
Santiago, Chile (clay)
Brazil	3
Chile	2

Final; 2–4 October
São Paulo, Brazil (clay)
Ecuador	1
Brazil	4

== First round ==
=== Venezuela vs. Canada ===
Venezuela
1
Caracas, Venezuela
30 January–1 February 1987
Hard

Canada
4

			1	2	3	4	5
1	(Venezuela) (Canada)	Carlos Claverie; Martin Wostenholme	6; 3	3; 6	4; 6	4; 6
2	(Venezuela) (Canada)	Nicolás Pereira; Glenn Michibata	6; 8	2; 6	4; 6
3	(Venezuela) (Canada)	Valerio Boccitto / Iñaki Calvo; Mark Greenan / Glenn Michibata	8; 6	3; 6	2; 6	4; 6
4	(Venezuela) (Canada)	Nicolás Pereira; Martin Wostenholme	4; 6	6; 8
5	(Venezuela) (Canada)	Carlos Claverie; Glenn Michibata	6; 4	7; 5	8; 6

=== Colombia vs. Uruguay ===
Colombia
0
Bogotá, Colombia
30 January–1 February 1987
Clay

Uruguay
5

			1	2	3	4	5
1	(Colombia) (Uruguay)	Mario Rincón; Diego Pérez	3; 6	3; 6	3; 6
2	(Colombia) (Uruguay)	Álvaro Jordan; Marcelo Filippini	3; 6	3; 6	6; 2	6; 3	15; 17
3	(Colombia) (Uruguay)	Álvaro Jordan / Miguel Tobón; Victor Caldarelli / Diego Pérez	4; 6	4; 6	2; 6
4	(Colombia) (Uruguay)	Mario Rincón; Marcelo Filippini	6; 3	4; 6	0; 6
5	(Colombia) (Uruguay)	Álvaro Jordan; Diego Pérez	3; 6	2; 6

=== Caribbean/West Indies vs. Cuba ===
Caribbean/West Indies
3
Ocean Club, Nassau, Bahamas
30 January–1 February 1987
Clay

Cuba
2

			1	2	3	4	5
1	(Cricket West Indies) (Cuba)	Doug Burke; Mario Tabares	6; 3	8; 6	6; 3
2	(Cricket West Indies) (Cuba)	Roger Smith; Juan Pino	6; 1	8; 10	6; 4	2; 6	3; 6
3	(Cricket West Indies) (Cuba)	Doug Burke / Roger Smith; Wilfredo Henry-Torriente / Mario Tabares	6; 3	7; 5	6; 3
4	(Cricket West Indies) (Cuba)	Roger Smith; Mario Tabares	6; 3	6; 0	6; 4
5	(Cricket West Indies) (Cuba)	Doug Burke; Juan Pino	5; 7	0; 2				retired

== Quarterfinals ==
=== Ecuador vs. Bolivia ===
Ecuador
5
Guayaquil Tenis Club, Guayaquil, Ecuador
13–15 March 1987
Clay

Bolivia
0

			1	2	3	4	5
1	(Ecuador) (Bolivia)	Andrés Gómez; Hrvoje Eterovic	6; 2	6; 0	6; 2
2	(Ecuador) (Bolivia)	Raúl Viver; Álvaro Garrón	6; 1	6; 1	6; 0
3	(Ecuador) (Bolivia)	Andrés Gómez / Hugo Núñez; Hrvoje Eterovic / Hector Villarroel	6; 2	6; 2	7; 5
4	(Ecuador) (Bolivia)	Raúl Viver; Hrvoje Eterovic	6; 0	6; 2
5	(Ecuador) (Bolivia)	Andrés Gómez; Álvaro Garrón	6; 0	6; 0

=== Peru vs. Canada ===
Peru
2
Lima, Peru
13–15 March 1987
Clay

Canada
3

			1	2	3	4	5
1	(Peru) (Canada)	Pablo Arraya; Andrew Sznajder	6; 1	6; 3	8; 6
2	(Peru) (Canada)	Jaime Yzaga; Martin Wostenholme	6; 1	8; 10	6; 2	5; 7	2; 6
3	(Peru) (Canada)	Carlos di Laura / Jaime Yzaga; Martin Laurendeau / Glenn Michibata	5; 7	6; 4	7; 5	6; 2
4	(Peru) (Canada)	Jaime Yzaga; Andrew Sznajder	7; 9	4; 6	4; 6
5	(Peru) (Canada)	Pablo Arraya; Martin Wostenholme	5; 7	6; 2	7; 5	1; 6	2; 6

=== Uruguay vs. Brazil ===
Uruguay
2
Montevideo, Uruguay
13–15 March 1987
Clay (indoors)

Brazil
3

			1	2	3	4	5
1	(Uruguay) (Brazil)	Diego Pérez; Luiz Mattar	6; 3	2; 6	6; 4	3; 6	5; 7
2	(Uruguay) (Brazil)	Victor Caldarelli; Ivan Kley	4; 6	6; 4	6; 2	3; 6	6; 3
3	(Uruguay) (Brazil)	Victor Caldarelli / Diego Pérez; Luiz Mattar / Cássio Motta	3; 6	4; 6	6; 4	6; 4	4; 6
4	(Uruguay) (Brazil)	Diego Pérez; Ivan Kley	6; 2	11; 9	6; 2
5	(Uruguay) (Brazil)	Victor Caldarelli; Luiz Mattar	3; 6	2; 6	6; 3	6; 4	5; 7

=== Caribbean/West Indies vs. Chile ===
Caribbean/West Indies
2
Nassau, Bahamas
13–15 March 1987
Hard

Chile
3

			1	2	3	4	5
1	(Cricket West Indies) (Chile)	Roger Smith; Robinson Ureta	12; 10	7; 5	2; 6	7; 5
2	(Cricket West Indies) (Chile)	Doug Burke; Ricardo Acuña	3; 6	3; 6	7; 9
3	(Cricket West Indies) (Chile)	Doug Burke / Roger Smith; Ricardo Acuña / Hans Gildemeister	2; 6	4; 6	8; 10
4	(Cricket West Indies) (Chile)	Doug Burke; Robinson Ureta	6; 3	6; 4	3; 6	8; 6
5	(Cricket West Indies) (Chile)	Roger Smith; Ricardo Acuña	6; 8	6; 8	6; 3	8; 6	4; 6

== Semifinals ==
=== Canada vs. Ecuador ===
Canada
2
Edmonton, Canada
24–26 July 1987
Hard

Ecuador
3

			1	2	3	4	5
1	(Canada) (Ecuador)	Andrew Sznajder; Hugo Núñez	8; 6	6; 4	8; 6
2	(Canada) (Ecuador)	Glenn Michibata; Andrés Gómez	1; 6	4; 6	2; 6
3	(Canada) (Ecuador)	Grant Connell` / Mark Greenan; Andrés Gómez / Hugo Núñez	5; 7	9; 7	4; 6	1; 6
4	(Canada) (Ecuador)	Glenn Michibata; Hugo Núñez	6; 8	6; 3	6; 2	6; 2
5	(Canada) (Ecuador)	Andrew Sznajder; Andrés Gómez	6; 4	4; 6	4; 6	7; 5	5; 7

=== Chile vs. Brazil ===
Chile
2
Santiago, Chile
24–27 July 1987
Clay

Brazil
3

			1	2	3	4	5
1	(Chile) (Brazil)	Pedro Rebolledo; Cássio Motta	6; 1	6; 3	4; 6	6; 3
2	(Chile) (Brazil)	Ricardo Acuña; Luiz Mattar	2; 6	2; 6	8; 10
3	(Chile) (Brazil)	Ricardo Acuña / Hans Gildemeister; Luiz Mattar / Cássio Motta	5; 7	2; 6	1; 6
4	(Chile) (Brazil)	Ricardo Acuña; Cássio Motta	6; 1	2; 6	2; 6	3; 6
5	(Chile) (Brazil)	Pedro Rebolledo; Luiz Mattar	4; 6	6; 1	6; 3

== Final ==
=== Brazil vs. Ecuador ===
Brazil
4
São Paulo, Brazil
2–4 October 1987
Clay

Ecuador
1

			1	2	3	4	5
1	(Brazil) (Ecuador)	Cássio Motta; Andrés Gómez	6; 8	5; 7	9; 7	3; 6
2	(Brazil) (Ecuador)	Luiz Mattar; Hugo Núñez	6; 1	6; 1	6; 2
3	(Brazil) (Ecuador)	Ricardo Acioly / Luiz Mattar; Andrés Gómez / Hugo Núñez	7; 5	6; 3	6; 8	6; 4
4	(Brazil) (Ecuador)	Luiz Mattar; Andrés Gómez	6; 3	1; 6	8; 10	6; 2	6; 1
5	(Brazil) (Ecuador)	Cássio Motta; Hugo Núñez	6; 3	6; 1
