= 1985 Davis Cup Americas Zone =

Tennis tournament region

The Americas Zone was one of the three regional zones of the 1985 Davis Cup.

8 teams entered the Americas Zone in total, with the winner promoted to the following year's World Group. Mexico defeated Brazil in the final and qualified for the 1986 World Group.

== Participating nations ==
- Brazil
- Canada
- Caribbean/West Indies
- Colombia
- Mexico
- Peru
- Uruguay
- Venezuela

=== Draw ===
Quarterfinals; 8–10 March
Caracas, Venezuela (hard)
Brazil	5
Venezuela	0
Montevideo, Uruguay (clay)
Uruguay	2
Colombia	3
Chicoutimi, Canada (indoor carpet)
Caribbean/West Indies	1
Canada	4
Mexico City, Mexico (clay)
Peru	2
Mexico	3

Semifinals; 2–4 August
Porto Alegre, Brazil (clay)
Brazil	4
Colombia	1
Chicoutimi, Canada (clay)
Canada	2
Mexico	3

Final; 4–6 October
Porto Alegre, Brazil (clay)
Brazil	1
Mexico	4

== Quarterfinals ==
=== Venezuela vs. Brazil ===
Venezuela
0
Altamira Tennis Club, Caracas, Venezuela
8–10 March 1985
Hard

Brazil
5

			1	2	3	4	5
1	(Venezuela) (Brazil)	Carlos Claverie; Marcos Hocevar	3; 6	16; 14	4; 6	4; 6
2	(Venezuela) (Brazil)	Alfonso Mora; Cássio Motta	1; 6	1; 6	5; 7
3	(Venezuela) (Brazil)	Iñaki Calvo / Randolf Scheller; Carlos Kirmayr / Cássio Motta	4; 6	2; 6	2; 6
4	(Venezuela) (Brazil)	Alfonso Mora; Carlos Kirmayr	3; 6	3; 6
5	(Venezuela) (Brazil)	Carlos Claverie; Dácio Campos	3; 6	3; 6

=== Uruguay vs. Colombia ===
Uruguay
2
Montevideo, Uruguay
8–10 March 1985
Clay

Colombia
3

			1	2	3	4	5
1	(Uruguay) (Colombia)	Marcelo Filippini; Álvaro Jordan	3; 6	2; 6	3; 6
2	(Uruguay) (Colombia)	Diego Pérez; Luis Arturo González	6; 1	6; 0	6; 0
3	(Uruguay) (Colombia)	Diego Pérez / Hugo Roverano; René Gómez / Álvaro Jordan	6; 8	4; 6	6; 3	4; 6
4	(Uruguay) (Colombia)	Diego Pérez; Álvaro Jordan	6; 0	6; 1	6; 1
5	(Uruguay) (Colombia)	Marcelo Filippini; Luis Arturo González	2; 6	6; 3	4; 6	1; 6

=== Canada vs. Caribbean/West Indies ===
Canada
4
Chicoutimi, Canada
8–10 March 1985
Carpet (indoors)

Caribbean/West Indies
1

			1	2	3	4	5
1	(Canada) (Cricket West Indies)	Martin Wostenholme; Roger Smith	6; 4	9; 7	6; 3
2	(Canada) (Cricket West Indies)	Stéphane Bonneau; Karl Hale	7; 9	7; 5	6; 3	6; 4
3	(Canada) (Cricket West Indies)	Josef Brabenec / Derek Segal; Karl Hale / Roger Smith	3; 6	5; 7	4; 6
4	(Canada) (Cricket West Indies)	Martin Wostenholme; Karl Hale	6; 4	6; 2	7; 5
5	(Canada) (Cricket West Indies)	Stéphane Bonneau; Roger Smith	4; 6	17; 15	6; 3

=== Mexico vs. Peru ===
Mexico
3
Estadio Rafael Osuna, Mexico City, Mexico
8–10 March 1985
Clay

Peru
2

			1	2	3	4	5
1	(Mexico) (Peru)	Jorge Lozano; Carlos di Laura	9; 7	3; 6	6; 8	5; 7
2	(Mexico) (Peru)	Francisco Maciel; Pablo Arraya	6; 3	2; 6	7; 5	7; 5
3	(Mexico) (Peru)	Leonardo Lavalle / Fernando Pérez Pascal; Fernando Maynetto / Jaime Yzaga	8; 6	3; 6	6; 1	3; 6	6; 3
4	(Mexico) (Peru)	Jorge Lozano; Pablo Arraya	6; 3	5; 7	3; 6	6; 4	2; 6
5	(Mexico) (Peru)	Francisco Maciel; Carlos di Laura	6; 4	6; 4	6; 2

== Semifinals ==
=== Brazil vs. Colombia ===
Brazil
4
Porto Alegre, Brazil
2–4 August 1985
Clay

Colombia
1

			1	2	3	4	5
1	(Brazil) (Colombia)	Dácio Campos; Carlos Gómez	6; 2	6; 4	6; 1
2	(Brazil) (Colombia)	Cássio Motta; Álvaro Jordan	7; 5	6; 3	5; 7	2; 6	2; 6
3	(Brazil) (Colombia)	Dácio Campos / Carlos Kirmayr; Carlos Gómez / Álvaro Jordan	6; 4	6; 4	6; 1
4	(Brazil) (Colombia)	Dácio Campos; Álvaro Jordan	6; 3	4; 6	6; 3	6; 1
5	(Brazil) (Colombia)	Marcos Hocevar; Luis Arturo González	6; 0	6; 1

=== Canada vs. Mexico ===
Canada
2
Chicoutimi, Canada
2–4 August 1985
Clay

Mexico
3

			1	2	3	4	5
1	(Canada) (Mexico)	Stéphane Bonneau; Francisco Maciel	6; 8	6; 4	5; 7	2; 6
2	(Canada) (Mexico)	Martin Wostenholme; Leonardo Lavalle	7; 5	3; 6	6; 8	8; 6	6; 2
3	(Canada) (Mexico)	Mark Greenan / Glenn Michibata; Francisco Maciel / Agustín Moreno	9; 7	9; 7	6; 4
4	(Canada) (Mexico)	Martin Wostenholme; Francisco Maciel	2; 6	3; 6	0; 6
5	(Canada) (Mexico)	Stéphane Bonneau; Leonardo Lavalle	10; 12	1; 6	2; 6

== Final ==
=== Brazil vs. Mexico ===
Brazil
1
Porto Alegre, Brazil
4–6 October 1985
Clay

Mexico
4

			1	2	3	4	5
1	(Brazil) (Mexico)	Dácio Campos; Leonardo Lavalle	1; 6	3; 6	2; 6
2	(Brazil) (Mexico)	Júlio Góes; Francisco Maciel	3; 6	5; 7	4; 6
3	(Brazil) (Mexico)	Carlos Kirmayr / Cássio Motta; Jorge Lozano / Raúl Ramírez	1; 6	6; 3	9; 7	3; 6	6; 0
4	(Brazil) (Mexico)	Júlio Góes; Leonardo Lavalle	7; 5	1; 6	1; 6	1; 6
5	(Brazil) (Mexico)	Dácio Campos; Francisco Maciel	6; 3	5; 7	3; 6
