= 1981 Davis Cup Americas Zone =

Tennis competition

The Americas Zone was one of the three regional zones of the 1981 Davis Cup.

8 teams entered the Americas Zone in total, split across the North & Central America and South America Zones. With the introduction of a new tiered format, the previous year's sub-zonal finalists bypassed Zonal competition and qualified directly for the new 16-team World Group. The remaining teams would now compete for a place in the following year's World Group. The winner of each sub-zone advanced to the Americas Inter-Zonal Final to compete for one place in next year's World Group.

Chile defeated Colombia in the Americas Inter-Zonal Final and qualified for the 1982 World Group.

== Participating nations ==
North & Central America Zone:

- Canada
- Caribbean/West Indies
- Colombia
- Venezuela

South America Zone:

- Chile
- Ecuador
- Peru
- Uruguay

== North & Central America Zone ==
=== Draw ===
Semifinals; 9–11 January
Bogotá, Colombia (clay)
Colombia	3
Canada	2
Caracas, Venezuela (hard)
Venezuela	4
Caribbean/West Indies	1

Final; 13–15 February
Bogotá, Colombia (clay)
Colombia	5
Venezuela	0

=== Semifinals ===
==== Colombia vs. Canada ====
Colombia
3
Bogotá, Colombia
9–11 January 1981
Clay

Canada
2

			1	2	3	4	5
1	(Colombia) (Canada)	Carlos Gómez; Réjean Genois	4; 6	2; 6	6; 4	2; 6
2	(Colombia) (Canada)	Alejandro Cortes; Martin Wostenholme	6; 2	6; 2	6; 4
3	(Colombia) (Canada)	Carlos Behar / Alejandro Cortes; Stéphane Bonneau / Réjean Genois	6; 2	6; 3	10; 8
4	(Colombia) (Canada)	Alejandro Cortes; Stéphane Bonneau	6; 4	2; 6	6; 4	6; 3
5	(Colombia) (Canada)	Gabriel Monroy; Martin Wostenholme	4; 6	4; 6

==== Venezuela vs. Caribbean/West Indies ====
Venezuela
4
Altamira Tennis Club, Caracas, Venezuela
9–11 January 1981
Hard

Caribbean/West Indies
1

			1	2	3	4	5
1	(Venezuela) (Cricket West Indies)	Carlos Claverie; John Antonas	8; 10	6; 3	3; 6	7; 5	6; 1
2	(Venezuela) (Cricket West Indies)	Jorge Andrew; Compton Russell	6; 4	6; 2	6; 3
3	(Venezuela) (Cricket West Indies)	Jorge Andrew / Ismael Sauce; Compton Russell / John Antonas	6; 4	6; 4	6; 4
4	(Venezuela) (Cricket West Indies)	Randolf Scheller; John Antonas	1; 6	3; 6
5	(Venezuela) (Cricket West Indies)	Carlos Claverie; Compton Russell	6; 2	7; 5

=== Final ===
==== Colombia vs. Venezuela ====
Colombia
5
Country Club de Bogotá, Bogotá, Colombia
13–15 February 1981
Clay

Venezuela
0

			1	2	3	4	5
1	(Colombia) (Venezuela)	Carlos Behar; Randolf Scheller	2; 6	6; 3	6; 2	6; 1
2	(Colombia) (Venezuela)	Alejandro Cortes; Jorge Andrew	7; 5	3; 6	9; 7	3; 2		retired
3	(Colombia) (Venezuela)	Carlos Behar / Carlos Gómez; Ismael Sauce / Abraham Sojo	6; 4	6; 3	6; 4
4	(Colombia) (Venezuela)	Carlos Gómez; Randolf Scheller	14; 12	6; 2
5	(Colombia) (Venezuela)	Gabriel Monroy; Ismael Sauce	3; 6	6; 2	9; 7

== South America Zone ==
=== Draw ===
Semifinals; 9–11 January
Lima, Peru (clay)
Peru	1
Chile	4
Guayaquil, Ecuador (clay)
Ecuador	2
Uruguay	3

Final; 13–15 February
Santiago, Chile (clay)
Chile	5
Uruguay	0

=== Semifinals ===
==== Peru vs. Chile ====
Peru
1
Club Lawn Tennis de la Exposición, Lima, Peru
9–11 January 1981
Clay

Chile
4

			1	2	3	4	5
1	(Peru) (Chile)	Fernando Maynetto; Hans Gildemeister	2; 6	3; 6	4; 6
2	(Peru) (Chile)	Pablo Arraya; Pedro Rebolledo	6; 4	2; 6	5; 7	1; 6
3	(Peru) (Chile)	Pablo Arraya / Fernando Maynetto; Ricardo Acuña / Belus Prajoux	4; 6	2; 6	7; 5	2; 6
4	(Peru) (Chile)	Carlos di Laura; Pedro Rebolledo	5; 7	3; 6
5	(Peru) (Chile)	Pablo Arraya; Ricardo Acuña	5; 7	6; 2	6; 3

==== Ecuador vs. Uruguay ====
Ecuador
2
Club Nacional de Guayaquil, Guayaquil, Ecuador
9–11 January 1981
Clay

Uruguay
3

			1	2	3	4	5
1	(Ecuador) (Uruguay)	Ricardo Ycaza; José Luis Damiani	4; 6	4; 4				retired
2	(Ecuador) (Uruguay)	Andrés Gómez; Diego Pérez	6; 4	6; 3	7; 5
3	(Ecuador) (Uruguay)	Andrés Gómez / Raúl Viver; José Luis Damiani / Diego Pérez	3; 6	9; 7	4; 6	8; 6	6; 3
4	(Ecuador) (Uruguay)	Andrés Gómez; José Luis Damiani	6; 4	6; 4	2; 6	3; 6	5; 7
5	(Ecuador) (Uruguay)	Raúl Viver; Diego Pérez	2; 6	6; 4	9; 11	2; 6

=== Final ===
==== Chile vs. Uruguay ====
Chile
5
Santiago, Chile
13–15 February 1981
Clay

Uruguay
0

			1	2	3	4	5
1	(Chile) (Uruguay)	Pedro Rebolledo; Alberto Laborde	6; 1	6; 1	6; 1
2	(Chile) (Uruguay)	Belus Prajoux; Diego Pérez	6; 4	7; 5	6; 2
3	(Chile) (Uruguay)	Hans Gildemeister / Belus Prajoux; Alberto Laborde / Diego Pérez	6; 1	6; 4	6; 2
4	(Chile) (Uruguay)	Ricardo Acuña; Diego Pérez	6; 3	6; 2
5	(Chile) (Uruguay)	Belus Prajoux; Alberto Laborde	6; 3	6; 2

== Americas Inter-Zonal Final ==
=== Colombia vs. Chile ===
Colombia
2
América Tenis Club, Bogotá, Colombia
6–8 March 1981
Clay (indoors)

Chile
3

			1	2	3	4	5
1	(Colombia) (Chile)	Jairo Velasco; Ricardo Acuña	4; 6	3; 6	15; 13	6; 4	6; 1
2	(Colombia) (Chile)	Alejandro Cortes; Hans Gildemeister	4; 6	2; 6	2; 6
3	(Colombia) (Chile)	Alejandro Cortes / Jairo Velasco; Hans Gildemeister / Belus Prajoux	4; 6	3; 6	6; 3	2; 6
4	(Colombia) (Chile)	Alejandro Cortes; Ricardo Acuña	6; 8	4; 6	3; 6
5	(Colombia) (Chile)	Alberto Jiménez; Belus Prajoux	2; 1					retired
