= 1984 Davis Cup Americas Zone =

International tennis competition

The Americas Zone was one of the three regional zones of the 1984 Davis Cup.

9 teams entered the Americas Zone in total, with the winner promoted to the following year's World Group. Chile defeated Brazil in the final and qualified for the 1985 World Group.

== Participating nations ==
- Brazil
- Canada
- Caribbean/West Indies
- Chile
- Colombia
- Mexico
- Peru
- Uruguay
- Venezuela

=== Draw ===
First round 13–15 January
Chile
bye
bye
Colombia
Canada
bye
Caracas, Venezuela (hard)
Venezuela	0
Mexico	5
Caribbean/West Indies
bye
bye
Uruguay
Peru
bye
bye
Brazil

Quarterfinals; 13–15 January; 2–4 March
Santiago, Chile (clay)
Chile	5
Colombia	0
Mexico City, Mexico (clay)
Canada	0
Mexico	5
Bridgetown, Barbados (clay)
Caribbean/West Indies	1
Uruguay	4
Rio de Janeiro, Brazil (clay)
Peru	0
Brazil	5

Semifinals; 4–6 May
Santiago, Chile (clay)
Chile	5
Mexico	0
Rio de Janeiro, Brazil (clay)
Uruguay	2
Brazil	3

Final; 28–30 September
Santiago, Chile (clay)
Chile	4
Brazil	1

== First round ==
=== Venezuela vs. Mexico ===
Venezuela
0
Altamira Tennis Club, Caracas, Venezuela
13–15 January 1984
Hard

Mexico
5

			1	2	3	4	5
1	(Venezuela) (Mexico)	Fabio Mionbet; Francisco Maciel	6; 8	3; 6	1; 6
2	(Venezuela) (Mexico)	Iñaki Calvo; Fernando Pérez Pascal	7; 9	6; 4	7; 5	4; 6	2; 6
3	(Venezuela) (Mexico)	Jorge Andrew / Iñaki Calvo; Alfonso González / Fernando Pérez Pascal	4; 6	4; 6	4; 6
4	(Venezuela) (Mexico)	Fabio Mionbet; Fernando Pérez Pascal	7; 5	4; 6	4; 6
5	(Venezuela) (Mexico)	Iñaki Calvo; Alfonso González	2; 6	2; 6

== Quarterfinals ==
=== Chile vs. Colombia ===
Chile
5
Santiago, Chile
13–15 January 1984
Clay

Colombia
0

			1	2	3	4	5
1	(Chile) (Colombia)	Hans Gildemeister; Álvaro Jordan	6; 2	4; 6	4; 6	6; 0	6; 4
2	(Chile) (Colombia)	Ricardo Acuña; René Gómez	6; 2	6; 2	6; 3
3	(Chile) (Colombia)	Álvaro Fillol / Belus Prajoux; Álvaro Jordan / Ruben Perczek	6; 3	6; 3	6; 2
4	(Chile) (Colombia)	Ricardo Acuña; Álvaro Jordan	6; 3	5; 7	6; 1
5	(Chile) (Colombia)	Álvaro Fillol; Ruben Perczek	7; 5	7; 5

=== Mexico vs. Canada ===
Mexico
5
Estadio Rafael Osuna, Mexico City, Mexico
2–4 March 1984
Clay

Canada
0

			1	2	3	4	5
1	(Mexico) (Canada)	Jorge Lozano; Glenn Michibata	5; 7	6; 8	6; 3	6; 3	6; 4
2	(Mexico) (Canada)	Francisco Maciel; Derek Segal	6; 4	6; 3	9; 11	6; 3
3	(Mexico) (Canada)	Jorge Lozano / Fernando Pérez Pascal; William Cowan / Glenn Michibata	9; 7	6; 2	6; 4
4	(Mexico) (Canada)	Jorge Lozano; Derek Segal	6; 3	6; 0
5	(Mexico) (Canada)	Francisco Maciel; Glenn Michibata	5; 7	6; 2	6; 3

=== Caribbean/West Indies vs. Uruguay ===
Caribbean/West Indies
1
Paradise Hotel, Bridgetown, Barbados
2–4 March 1984
Clay

Uruguay
4

			1	2	3	4	5
1	(Cricket West Indies) (Uruguay)	Adrian Clarke; Hugo Roverano	4; 6	2; 6	1; 6
2	(Cricket West Indies) (Uruguay)	Stuart Sarnia; Diego Pérez	5; 7	1; 6	1; 6
3	(Cricket West Indies) (Uruguay)	Karl Hale / Stuart Sarnia; Victor Caldarelli / Diego Pérez	2; 6	6; 1	1; 6	8; 10
4	(Cricket West Indies) (Uruguay)	Jimmy Tasker; Victor Caldarelli	10; 8	7; 5
5	(Cricket West Indies) (Uruguay)	Stuart Sarnia; Hugo Roverano	5; 7	4; 6

=== Brazil vs. Peru ===
Brazil
5
Rio de Janeiro, Brazil
2–4 March 1984
Clay

Peru
0

			1	2	3	4	5
1	(Brazil) (Peru)	Marcos Hocevar; Carlos di Laura	3; 6	8; 6	6; 1	6; 4
2	(Brazil) (Peru)	Cássio Motta; Pablo Arraya	6; 3	6; 2	6; 4
3	(Brazil) (Peru)	Carlos Kirmayr / Cássio Motta; Pablo Arraya / Fernando Maynetto	7; 9	6; 4	7; 5	12; 10
4	(Brazil) (Peru)	Nelson Aerts; Carlos di Laura	6; 4	6; 2
5	(Brazil) (Peru)	Marcos Hocevar; Jaime Yzaga	6; 4	3; 2				retired

== Semifinals ==
=== Chile vs. Mexico ===
Chile
5
Estadio Nacional, Santiago, Chile
4–6 May 1984
Clay

Mexico
0

			1	2	3	4	5
1	(Chile) (Mexico)	Pedro Rebolledo; Fernando Pérez Pascal	6; 1	6; 4	6; 8	3; 6	7; 5
2	(Chile) (Mexico)	Hans Gildemeister; Francisco Maciel	6; 2	6; 2	6; 3
3	(Chile) (Mexico)	Ricardo Acuña / Álvaro Fillol; Jorge Lozano / Fernando Pérez Pascal	6; 1	6; 4	2; 6	6; 4
4	(Chile) (Mexico)	Hans Gildemeister; Fernando Pérez Pascal	6; 1	2; 6	6; 3
5	(Chile) (Mexico)	Pedro Rebolledo; Javier Contreras	6; 1	6; 2

=== Brazil vs. Uruguay ===
Brazil
3
Rio de Janeiro, Brazil
4–6 May 1984
Clay

Uruguay
2

			1	2	3	4	5
1	(Brazil) (Uruguay)	Marcos Hocevar; Diego Pérez	5; 7	2; 6	0; 6
2	(Brazil) (Uruguay)	Cássio Motta; Victor Caldarelli	6; 3	6; 1	6; 3
3	(Brazil) (Uruguay)	Carlos Kirmayr / Cássio Motta; Diego Pérez / Philippe Pinet	6; 2	6; 3	6; 3
4	(Brazil) (Uruguay)	Cássio Motta; Diego Pérez	5; 7	6; 3	2; 6			retired
5	(Brazil) (Uruguay)	Marcos Hocevar; Victor Caldarelli	8; 6	6; 3	8; 6

== Final ==
=== Chile vs. Brazil ===
Chile
4
Estadio Nacional, Santiago, Chile
28–30 September 1984
Clay

Brazil
1

			1	2	3	4	5
1	(Chile) (Brazil)	Hans Gildemeister; Cássio Motta	6; 3	6; 4	6; 2
2	(Chile) (Brazil)	Pedro Rebolledo; Marcos Hocevar	7; 5	7; 5	6; 2
3	(Chile) (Brazil)	Ricardo Acuña / Álvaro Fillol; Carlos Kirmayr / Cássio Motta	1; 6	7; 9	2; 6
4	(Chile) (Brazil)	Hans Gildemeister; Marcos Hocevar	6; 4	6; 1	6; 4
5	(Chile) (Brazil)	Pedro Rebolledo; Cássio Motta	6; 0	6; 3
