= 1983 Davis Cup Americas Zone =

International tennis competition

The Americas Zone was one of the three regional zones of the 1983 Davis Cup.

9 teams entered the Americas Zone in total. This year marked the abolition of the North & Central America and the South America sub-zones, with all teams now competing within a single bracket, with the overall winner being promoted to the following year's World Group.

Ecuador defeated Brazil in the final and qualified for the 1984 World Group.

== Participating nations ==
- Brazil
- Canada
- Caribbean/West Indies
- Colombia
- Ecuador
- Mexico
- Peru
- Uruguay
- Venezuela

=== Draw ===
First round 14–16 January
Mexico
bye
bye
Uruguay
Colombia
bye
Lima, Peru (clay)
Brazil | 4
Peru | 1
Caribbean/West Indies
bye
bye
Ecuador
Venezuela
bye
bye
Canada

Quarterfinals; 4–6 March
Montevideo, Uruguay (clay)
Mexico | 1
Uruguay | 4
Bogotá, Colombia (indoor clay)
Colombia | 0
Brazil | 5
Guayaquil, Ecuador (clay)
Caribbean/West Indies | 0
Ecuador | 5
Laval, Canada (indoor hard)
Venezuela | 2
Canada | 3

Semifinals; 6–8 May
Montevideo, Uruguay (clay)
Uruguay | 2
Brazil | 3
Guayaquil, Ecuador (clay)
Ecuador | 4
Canada | 1

Final; 30 September–2 October
Guayaquil, Ecuador (clay)
Brazil | 0
Ecuador | 5

== First round ==
=== Peru vs. Brazil ===
Peru
1
Club Lawn Tennis de la Exposición, Lima, Peru
14–16 January 1983
Clay

Brazil
4

| | | | 1 | 2 | 3 | 4 | 5 |
|---|---|---|---|---|---|---|---|
| 1 | (Peru) (Brazil) | Carlos di Laura; Carlos Kirmayr | 1; 6 | 4; 6 | 4; 6 |
| 2 | (Peru) (Brazil) | Pablo Arraya; Marcos Hocevar | 6; 3 | 2; 6 | 6; 1 | 6; 3 |
| 3 | (Peru) (Brazil) | Pablo Arraya / Fernando Maynetto; Carlos Kirmayr / Cássio Motta | 4; 6 | 3; 6 | 4; 6 |
| 4 | (Peru) (Brazil) | Pablo Arraya; Carlos Kirmayr | 6; 8 | 5; 7 | 4; 6 |
| 5 | (Peru) (Brazil) | Carlos di Laura; Marcos Hocevar | 6; 8 | 2; 6 |

== Quarterfinals ==
=== Uruguay vs. Mexico ===
Uruguay
4
Montevideo, Uruguay
4–6 March 1983
Clay

Mexico
1

| | | | 1 | 2 | 3 | 4 | 5 |
|---|---|---|---|---|---|---|---|
| 1 | (Uruguay) (Mexico) | José Luis Damiani; Jorge Lozano | 6; 1 | 6; 2 | 6; 3 |
| 2 | (Uruguay) (Mexico) | Diego Pérez; Fernando Pérez Pascal | 6; 4 | 6; 2 | 6; 1 |
| 3 | (Uruguay) (Mexico) | José Luis Damiani / Diego Pérez; Jorge Lozano / Fernando Pérez Pascal | 3; 6 | 2; 6 | 2; 6 |
| 4 | (Uruguay) (Mexico) | José Luis Damiani; Fernando Pérez Pascal | 6; 4 | 10; 8 | 6; 2 |
| 5 | (Uruguay) (Mexico) | Diego Pérez; Francisco Maciel | 7; 5 | 0; 6 | 7; 5 |

=== Colombia vs. Brazil ===
Colombia
0
América Tenis Club, Bogotá, Colombia
4–6 March 1983
Clay (indoors)

Brazil
5

| | | | 1 | 2 | 3 | 4 | 5 |
|---|---|---|---|---|---|---|---|
| 1 | (Colombia) (Brazil) | Javier Restrepo; Cássio Motta | 1; 6 | 2; 6 | 2; 6 |
| 2 | (Colombia) (Brazil) | René Gómez; Carlos Kirmayr | 2; 6 | 6; 3 | 1; 6 | 4; 6 |
| 3 | (Colombia) (Brazil) | René Gómez / Javier Restrepo; Carlos Kirmayr / Cássio Motta | 1; 6 | 9; 7 | 5; 7 | 2; 6 |
| 4 | (Colombia) (Brazil) | Luis Arturo González; Carlos Kirmayr | 5; 7 | 6; 0 | 3; 6 |
| 5 | (Colombia) (Brazil) | René Gómez; Cássio Motta | 2; 6 | 5; 7 |

=== Ecuador vs. Caribbean/West Indies ===
Ecuador
5
Guayaquil Tenis Club, Guayaquil, Ecuador
4–6 March 1983
Clay

Caribbean/West Indies
0

| | | | 1 | 2 | 3 | 4 | 5 |
|---|---|---|---|---|---|---|---|---|
| 1 | (Ecuador) (Cricket West Indies) | Andrés Gómez; Adrian Clarke | 6; 1 | 6; 4 | 6; 3 |
| 2 | (Ecuador) (Cricket West Indies) | Raúl Viver; Stuart Sarnia | 6; 0 | 6; 1 | 6; 2 |
| 3 | (Ecuador) (Cricket West Indies) | Andrés Gómez / Ricardo Ycaza; Leo Rolle / Stuart Sarnia | 6; 1 | 6; 0 | 6; 2 |
| 4 | (Ecuador) (Cricket West Indies) | Ricardo Ycaza; Stuart Sarnia | 3; 2 | | | | | retired |
| 5 | (Ecuador) (Cricket West Indies) | Raúl Viver; Adrian Clarke | 6; 0 | 6; 0 |

=== Canada vs. Venezuela ===
Canada
3
Laval, Canada
4–6 March 1983
Hard (indoors)

Venezuela
2

| | | | 1 | 2 | 3 | 4 | 5 |
|---|---|---|---|---|---|---|---|
| 1 | (Canada) (Venezuela) | Martin Wostenholme; Jorge Andrew | 6; 2 | 2; 6 | 6; 2 | 6; 4 |
| 2 | (Canada) (Venezuela) | Réjean Genois; Carlos Claverie | 6; 4 | 6; 1 | 2; 6 | 6; 3 |
| 3 | (Canada) (Venezuela) | Josef Brabenec / William Cowan; Jorge Andrew / Iñaki Calvo | 3; 6 | 6; 3 | 6; 4 | 4; 6 | 4; 6 |
| 4 | (Canada) (Venezuela) | Martin Wostenholme; Carlos Claverie | 6; 8 | 4; 6 | 6; 2 | 3; 6 |
| 5 | (Canada) (Venezuela) | Réjean Genois; Jorge Andrew | 6; 4 | 6; 3 | 6; 1 |

== Semifinals ==
=== Uruguay vs. Brazil ===
Uruguay
2
Montevideo, Uruguay
6–8 May 1983
Clay

Brazil
3

| | | | 1 | 2 | 3 | 4 | 5 |
|---|---|---|---|---|---|---|---|
| 1 | (Uruguay) (Brazil) | José Luis Damiani; Marcos Hocevar | 6; 8 | 6; 4 | 6; 4 | 3; 6 | 13; 15 |
| 2 | (Uruguay) (Brazil) | Diego Pérez; Carlos Kirmayr | 6; 3 | 8; 6 | 5; 7 | 6; 4 |
| 3 | (Uruguay) (Brazil) | José Luis Damiani / Diego Pérez; Carlos Kirmayr / Cássio Motta | 6; 1 | 6; 4 | 6; 8 | 2; 6 | 4; 6 |
| 4 | (Uruguay) (Brazil) | Diego Pérez; Marcos Hocevar | 8; 6 | 7; 5 | 6; 3 |
| 5 | (Uruguay) (Brazil) | José Luis Damiani; Carlos Kirmayr | 6; 3 | 5; 7 | 2; 6 | 7; 5 | 1; 6 |

=== Ecuador vs. Canada ===
Ecuador
4
Guayaquil Tenis Club, Guayaquil, Ecuador
6–8 May 1983
Clay

Canada
1

| | | | 1 | 2 | 3 | 4 | 5 |
|---|---|---|---|---|---|---|---|
| 1 | (Ecuador) (Canada) | Andrés Gómez; Glenn Michibata | 6; 2 | 6; 4 | 3; 6 | 6; 2 |
| 2 | (Ecuador) (Canada) | Ricardo Ycaza; John Picken | 6; 4 | 2; 6 | 6; 0 | 6; 4 |
| 3 | (Ecuador) (Canada) | Andrés Gómez / Ricardo Ycaza; Josef Brabenec / Réjean Genois | 6; 1 | 6; 1 | 6; 2 |
| 4 | (Ecuador) (Canada) | Martín Aguirre; John Picken | 1; 6 | 0; 6 |
| 5 | (Ecuador) (Canada) | Raúl Viver; Glenn Michibata | 6; 4 | 6; 4 |

== Final ==
=== Ecuador vs. Brazil ===
Ecuador
5
Guayaquil Tenis Club, Guayaquil, Ecuador
30 September–2 October 1983
Clay

Brazil
0

| | | | 1 | 2 | 3 | 4 | 5 |
|---|---|---|---|---|---|---|---|
| 1 | (Ecuador) (Brazil) | Andrés Gómez; Carlos Kirmayr | 6; 3 | 6; 2 | 6; 0 |
| 2 | (Ecuador) (Brazil) | Ricardo Ycaza; Marcos Hocevar | 7; 5 | 1; 6 | 6; 2 | 6; 2 |
| 3 | (Ecuador) (Brazil) | Andrés Gómez / Ricardo Ycaza; Carlos Kirmayr / Cássio Motta | 6; 3 | 11; 9 | 3; 6 | 4; 6 | 6; 1 |
| 4 | (Ecuador) (Brazil) | Ricardo Ycaza; Carlos Kirmayr | 8; 6 | 6; 2 |
| 5 | (Ecuador) (Brazil) | Raúl Viver; Marcos Hocevar | 6; 3 | 6; 4 |
