= Canada Davis Cup team =

Tennis team representing Canada

Canada
- Captain: Frank Dancevic
- Nations Ranking: 8 (21 September 2026)
- Highest ranking: 1 (6 February 2023)
- Colors: Red and white
- First year: 1913
- Years played: 96
- Ties played (W–L): 182 (86–96)
- Years in World Group: 17 (22–18)
- Davis Cup titles: 1 (2022)
- Runners-up: 1 (2019)
- Most total wins: Daniel Nestor (48–28)
- Most singles wins: Sébastien Lareau (17–16); Milos Raonic (17–5)
- Most doubles wins: Daniel Nestor (33–13)
- Best doubles team: Daniel Nestor / Frédéric Niemeyer (12–1)
- Most ties played: Daniel Nestor (53)
- Most years played: Daniel Nestor (25)

The Canada men's national tennis team represents Canada in Davis Cup tennis competition since 1913. They are overseen by Tennis Canada, the governing body of tennis in Canada.

The team won their first Davis Cup in 2022, beating Australia 2–0 in the final. In its first appearance in 1913 it had reached the World Group final, losing to the United States 0–3.

== History ==
=== 1913–2010: Moderate success ===
Canada competed in its first Davis Cup in 1913. The team won its first tie, played in June at the Queen's Club, London over South Africa by a score of 4–1. The team consisted of just two players, Robert Powell and Bernard Schwengers. Canada then in July easily defeated Belgium in the semi-finals 4–0. In the playoff final however, played a week later, they lost all three matches to the Americans in straight sets. (The Americans went on to defeat Great Britain in the challenge round, to win the competition.)

Canada did not play a World Group tie from 1921 until 1991, when the team of Grant Connell, Glenn Michibata, Andrew Sznajder, and Martin Wostenholme, with team captain Pierre Lamarche, lost 1–4 away to Spain. The following year, again in the World Group first round, Canada came closer to advancing, going down 2–3 at home to Sweden despite taking a first-day 2–0 lead. The tie was highlighted by a surprise singles win of rookie Daniel Nestor over superstar and then world number one ranked Stefan Edberg. Nestor could not repeat the magic, however, losing in the deciding rubber match in 5 sets to Magnus Gustafsson.

In 2004, Canada fell to the Netherlands 1–4 in the World Group first round. Team members then were Simon Larose, Frank Dancevic, Frédéric Niemeyer, and Daniel Nestor as a star doubles specialist.

=== 2011–12: Back in the World Group ===
In 2011, Canada defeated the Israel Davis Cup team 3–2 at the Canada Stadium in Ramat Hasharon, Israel to qualify for the 2012 Davis Cup World Group. Canada's team consisted of Milos Raonic, Vasek Pospisil, Daniel Nestor, Philip Bester and Peter Polansky. The teams split the first two matches in two upsets, as Pospisil defeated Dudi Sela and Amir Weintraub beat Raonic. Nestor and Pospisil defeated Jonathan Erlich and Andy Ram in the doubles match. On the final day, Sela defeated Polansky in the fourth match while Pospisil defeated Weintraub in the final match.

In 2012, Canada played against France in the first round of the World Group, but lost 1–4. Pospisil lost the first match to Jo-Wilfried Tsonga and Raonic won the next one against Julien Benneteau to end day one at 1–1. Canada then lost the three next matches (the doubles and the last singles match) as Raonic had to withdraw for his second singles match against Tsonga following an injury on his left knee. He was replaced by Dancevic who lost in straight sets. Canada secured its spot in the World Group in 2013, and for the second straight year, with a 4–1 victory over South Africa in the playoffs in September. Canada had only played two straight years in the World Group one other time in its history before that, in 1991–92.

=== 2013: Run to the World Group semifinals ===
In 2013, Canada upset the number one ranked tennis nation Spain 3–2 in the first round of the World Group, the first win ever for Canada at that stage in the Open Era. Raonic won the first match over Albert Ramos and Dancevic defeated then No. 34 Marcel Granollers to give Canada a 2–0 lead after the first day. Canada's doubles team of Nestor and Pospisil lost to Marc López and Granollers, but Raonic secured the win for Canada in the final day with a victory over Guillermo García-López. Dancevic lost the last match to Ramos. Canada then defeated in April Italy 3–1 in the quarterfinals to reach the second semifinal of its history, the first in the Open Era. Italy's Andreas Seppi won the first match over Pospisil, but Raonic answered back with a victory over Fabio Fognini. The Canadian doubles team of Nestor and Pospisil took the crucial doubles match in a marathon of almost four hours and a half over Daniele Bracciali and Fognini. Raonic gave Canada the win after defeating Seppi in the final day. Canada was eliminated 2–3 by Serbia in the semifinals in September. World No. 1 Novak Djokovic won the first match over Pospisil and Raonic took the second over Janko Tipsarević to end day one at 1–1. Canada had a 2–1 lead after the second day when the doubles team of Nestor and Pospisil defeated Nenad Zimonjić and Ilija Bozoljac. Raonic and Pospisil both lost their matches the final day, respectively to Djokovic and to Tipsarević. Canada will stay in the World Group in 2014 for a third straight year, a record.

=== 2014–2018: Continuing presence in the World Group ===
In 2014, a very diminished Canadian team lost in the World Group first round to Japan 1–4 as both Raonic and Pospisil were injured and not able to play. Canada then had to play a playoff in September against Colombia to stay in the World Group next year. They won the tie 3–2 meaning that Canada will play in the World Group for the fourth straight year.

In 2015, Canada had their revenge over Japan with a 3–2 win in the first round of the World Group. Raonic defeated Tatsuma Ito in straight sets in the first match and Kei Nishikori won against Pospisil to end the first day in a 1–1 tie. The next day, Canada's doubles team of Nestor and Pospisil won a closely contested match over Go Soeda and Yasutaka Uchiyama to give a 2–1 lead to Canada. Nishikori defeated Raonic in five sets the last day but Pospisil secured the victory for Canada with a straight-set win over Soeda. Canada next played its quarterfinal tie in July but, without its two best singles players Raonic and Pospisil who were both injured, fell 0–5 to Belgium on the road.

In 2016, Canada played its World Group first round against France. Again, without its best player Raonic who was out because of an adductor injury and Nestor not able to play for personal reasons, Canada was defeated by a score of 0–5. They next played a playoff tie in September against Chile, winning by the score of 5–0 and securing Canada's place in the World Group for the sixth straight year.

In 2017, Canada, once again without Raonic, lost for the second straight year in the first round of the World Group to Great Britain. Pospisil won his two singles matches over top 50 players Kyle Edmund and Dan Evans, but lost in doubles with Nestor against Dominic Inglot and Jamie Murray. 17-year-old Denis Shapovalov played the two other singles matches, losing the opener to Evans and the deciding rubber to Edmund. In the latter, he hit the match umpire, Arnaud Gabas, in the eye after launching a ball aimlessly towards the crowd in anger after dropping serve in the opening stages of the third set, defaulting the match and tie as a consequence. Canada then won in September a playoff tie over India by the score of 3–2, with wins by Shapovalov in singles and by Nestor and Pospisil in doubles, and will stay in the World Group for a seventh straight year.

In 2018, the first season with new captain Frank Dancevic, Canada lost once again in the first round of the World Group by the score of 1–3 to Croatia. Borna Ćorić won the first rubber over Pospisil, and Shapovalov won the second over Viktor Galović. Despite leading 6–2, 6–3, 4–2, Nestor and Pospisil lost the crucial doubles match against Marin Čilić and Ivan Dodig in five sets. The final day, Shapovalov lost to Ćorić, meaning that Canada had to play a playoff tie in September versus Netherlands to secure its place in the World Group for 2019, which they won by a score of 3–1, through two singles wins by Raonic and one singles win by Shapovalov.

=== 2019: First Canadian final ===
In February 2019, following a format change in the Davis Cup, Canada played in the 2019 Davis Cup qualifying round versus Slovakia in order to qualify for the 2019 Davis Cup Finals later in the year. Shapovalov won his first singles match, but then Canada lost the next two matches before rallying with two straight singles match victories by Shapovalov and newcomer Félix Auger-Aliassime to win by a score of 3–2.

The Canadian team fielded only two players in the 2019 Davis Cup Finals to make it to the final tie: Vasek Pospisil and Denis Shapovalov. In the group stage, Canada beat Italy by 2–1, winning both its singles matches against higher-ranked players. Pospisil beat Fabio Fognini in straight sets, and Shapovalov beat Matteo Berrettini in a nail-biter featuring three tie-breaks. The Italians won the doubles match. In their tie against the US, Pospisil beat Reilly Opelka in two tie-breaks, and Shapovalov beat Taylor Fritz, with a tie-break in the first set. The doubles match was not played.

In the knock-out stage, the Canadians played Australia in the quarterfinals. Pospisil again led off by beating John Millman in the first match, but Shapovalov lost in three sets to Alex de Minaur. They recovered, however, to win the doubles match in straight sets. They next faced Russia in the semifinals. Pospisil lost his first match to Andrey Rublev, who was undefeated. But Shapovalov beat Karen Khachanov, and the pair sealed a trip to the final in the doubles match. They faced Spain in the final tie.

== Results and fixtures ==
The following are lists of match results and scheduled matches for the current year.

Win Loss Fixture

=== 2025 ===
Qualifiers
First round

Canada
2
IGA Stadium, Montreal, Canada
1–2 February 2025
Hard (indoors)

Hungary
3

			1	2	3
1	(Canada) (Hungary)	Alexis Galarneau; Fábián Marozsán	3; 6	6; 3	3; 6
2	(Canada) (Hungary)	Gabriel Diallo; Márton Fucsovics	6; 3	2; 6	2; 6
3	(Canada) (Hungary)	Liam Draxl / Vasek Pospisil; Peter Fajta / Máté Valkusz	7^{7} 6^{2}	6; 4
4	(Canada) (Hungary)	Gabriel Diallo; Fábián Marozsán	6; 1	6; 3
5	(Canada) (Hungary)	Alexis Galarneau; Márton Fucsovics	6^{8} 7^{10}	4; 6

World Group I

Canada
4
Scotiabank Centre, Halifax, Canada
12–14 September 2025
Hard (indoors)

Israel
0

			1	2	3
1	(Canada) (Israel)	Gabriel Diallo; Daniel Cukierman	6; 1	6; 2
2	(Canada) (Israel)	Liam Draxl; Orel Kimhi	7^{7} 6^{5}	6; 4
3	(Canada) (Israel)	Liam Draxl / Cleeve Harper; Jordan Hasson / Ofek Shimanov	5; 7	6; 0	6; 4
4	(Canada) (Israel)	Cleeve Harper; Orel Kimhi	6; 3	7^{7} 6^{3}
5	(Canada) (Israel)	Liam Draxl; Daniel Cukierman				not played

=== 2026 ===
Qualifiers
First round

Canada
3
Thunderbird Sports Centre, Vancouver, Canada
6–7 February 2026
Hard (indoors)

Brazil
2

			1	2	3
1	(Canada) (Brazil)	Liam Draxl; João Lucas Reis da Silva	6; 3	6; 3
2	(Canada) (Brazil)	Gabriel Diallo; Gustavo Heide	6^{4} 7^{7}	6; 3	6^{3} 7^{7}
3	(Canada) (Brazil)	Liam Draxl / Cleeve Harper; Orlando Luz / Rafael Matos	6; 3	4; 6	5; 7
4	(Canada) (Brazil)	Gabriel Diallo; Matheus Pucinelli de Almeida	3; 6	6; 1	7^{7} 6^{4}
5	(Canada) (Brazil)	Liam Draxl; Gustavo Heide	6; 3	6; 4

Qualifiers
Second round

Canada
3
Centre Vidéotron, Quebec City, Canada
18–19 September
Hard (indoors)

France
1

			1	2	3
1	(Canada) (France)	Liam Draxl; Arthur Rinderknech	6; 2	7; 5
2	(Canada) (France)	Félix Auger-Aliassime; Quentin Halys	7^{7} 6^{5}	4; 6	6; 3
3	(Canada) (France)	Félix Auger-Aliassime / Duncan Chan; Benjamin Bonzi / Pierre-Hugues Herbert	6^{4} 7^{7}	3; 6
4	(Canada) (France)	Félix Auger-Aliassime; Arthur Rinderknech	4; 6	7^{7} 6^{5}	6; 4
5	(Canada) (France)	Liam Draxl; Quentin Halys				not played

Finals
Quarterfinals

Czech Republic

SuperTennis Arena, Bologna, Italy
24 November
Hard (indoors)

Canada

		1	2	3
1	(Czech Republic) (Canada)
2	(Czech Republic) (Canada)
3	(Czech Republic) (Canada)

== Players ==
=== Current team ===
Rankings as of October 26, 2026

Team representing Canada in 2026 Davis Cup Finals
Name	Age	First	Last		Nom.	Ties	Win/Loss			Ranks	
Name	Age	First	Year	Tie	Nom.	Ties	Sgl	Dbl	Total	Sgl	Dbl
Félix Auger-Aliassime	26	2019	2026	France	8	12	11–3	4–2	15–5	7	579
Denis Shapovalov	27	2016	2024	Germany	12	18	14–8	4–3	18–11	52	—N/a
Gabriel Diallo	25	2022	2026	Brazil	11	11	7–6	0–1	7–7	149	591
Liam Draxl	24	2025	2026	France	5	4	4–0	2–1	6–1	194	409
Duncan Chan	21	2026	2026	France	1	1	0–0	0–1	0–1	467	232

== Player records ==
Most total wins overall
#	Player	Years	Win–loss			Ties played	Years played
#	Player	Years	Singles	Doubles	Total	Ties played	Years played
1	Daniel Nestor	1992–2018	15–15	33–13	**48**–28	53	25
2	Vasek Pospisil	2008–2025	15–14	18–13	**33**–27	35	15
3	Sébastien Lareau	1991–2001	17–16	11–3	**28**–19	20	10
4	Grant Connell	1987–1997	8–3	15–6	**23**–9	21	10
5	Frédéric Niemeyer	1999–2009	9–11	13–2	**22**–13	18	10
6	Milos Raonic	2010–2023	17–5	2–1	**19**–6	13	8
7	**Denis Shapovalov**	2016–2024	14–8	4–3	**18**–11	18	6
7	Frank Dancevic	2002–2016	15–21	3–1	**18**–22	24	14
9	Mike Belkin	1966–1973	14–7	3–5	**17**–12	12	8
10	**Félix Auger-Aliassime**	2019–2026	11–3	4–2	**15**–5	12	4

Active players in bold. Statistics as of September 20, 2026

== Historical results ==
Here is the list of all match-ups since 1981, when the competition started being held in the current World Group format.

=== 1980s ===
Year	Competition	Date	Surface	Location	Opponent	Score	Result
1981	North & Central American Zone, 1st Round	9–11 Jan	Clay	Bogotá (COL)	Colombia	2–3	Loss
1982	North & Central American Zone, Semifinals	15–17 Jan	Hard	Caracas (VEN)	Venezuela	4–1	Win
1982	North & Central American Zone, Finals	5–7 Mar	Hard (i)	Montreal (CAN)	Colombia	3–1	Win
1982	Americas Inter-Zonal, Finals	5–7 Mar	Hard (i)	Laval (CAN)	Paraguay	1–4	Loss
1983	Americas Zone, Quarterfinals	4–6 Mar	Hard (i)	Laval (CAN)	Venezuela	3–2	Win
1983	Americas Zone, Semifinals	6–8 May	Clay	Guayaquil (ECU)	Ecuador	1–4	Loss
1984	Americas Zone, Quarterfinals	2–4 Mar	Clay	Mexico City (MEX)	Mexico	0–5	Loss
1985	Americas Zone, 1st Round	8–10 Mar	Carpet (i)	Chicoutimi (CAN)	Caribbean/West Indies	4–1	Win
1985	Americas Zone, Semifinals	2–4 Aug	Clay	Chicoutimi (CAN)	Mexico	2–3	Loss
1986	Americas Zone, Quarterfinals	7–9 Mar	Clay	Santiago de Chile (CHI)	Chile	2–3	Loss
1987	Americas Zone, 1st Round	30 Jan – 1 Feb	Hard	Caracas (VEN)	Venezuela	4–1	Win
1987	Americas Zone, Quarterfinals	13–15 Mar	Clay	Lima (PER)	Peru	3–2	Win
1987	Americas Zone, Semifinals	24–26 Jul	Hard	Edmonton (CAN)	Ecuador	2–3	Loss
1988	Americas Zone Group I, Quarterfinals	5–7 Feb	Clay	Guayaquil (ECU)	Ecuador	0–5	Loss
1988	Americas Zone, Relegation Play-offs	8–10 Apr	Carpet (i)	Vancouver (CAN)	Chile	4–1	Win
1989	Americas Group I, 1st Round	3–5 Feb	Carpet (i)	Montreal (CAN)	Uruguay	4–1	Win
1989	Americas Zone Group I, Semifinals	7–8 Apr	Clay	Buenos Aires (ARG)	Argentina	0–3	Loss

=== 1990s ===
Year	Competition	Date	Surface	Location	Opponent	Score	Result
1990	Americas Zone Group I, Quarterfinals	2–4 Feb	Carpet (i)	Vancouver (CAN)	Brazil	4–1	Win
1990	Americas Zone Group I, Semifinals	30 Mar – 1 Apr	Clay	Asunción (PAR)	Paraguay	5–0	Win
1990	World Group, Relegation Play-offs	21–23 Sep	Hard	Montreal (CAN)	Netherlands	3–2	Win
1991	World Group, 1st Round	1–3 Feb	Clay	Murcia (ESP)	Spain	1–4	Loss
1991	World Group, Relegation Play-offs	30 Mar – 1 Apr	Hard	Havana (CUB)	Cuba	3–2	Win
1992	World Group, 1st Round	31 Jan – 2 Feb	Carpet (i)	Vancouver (CAN)	Sweden	2–3	Loss
1992	World Group, Relegation Play-offs	25–27 Sep	Grass	Vancouver (CAN)	Austria	1–3	Loss
1993	Americas Zone Group I, Quarterfinals	5–7 Feb	Clay	Mexico City (MEX)	Mexico	1–4	Loss
1993	Americas Zone, Relegation Play-offs	26–28 Mar	Clay	Santiago de Chile (CHI)	Chile	1–3	Loss
1994	Americas Zone Group II, Quarterfinals	4–6 Feb	Hard (i)	Ottawa (CAN)	Jamaica	5–0	Win
1994	Americas Zone Group II, Semifinals	25–27 Mar	Clay	Bogotá (COL)	Colombia	3–2	Win
1994	Americas Zone Group II, Finals	15–17 Jul	Hard	Montreal (CAN)	Venezuela	2–3	Loss
1995	Americas Zone Group II, Quarterfinals	3–5 Feb	Clay	Port-au-Prince (HAI)	Haiti	3–2	Win
1995	Americas Zone Group II, Semifinals	31 Mar – 2 Apr	Carpet (i)	Kelowna (CAN)	Colombia	5–0	Win
1995	Americas Zone Group II, Finals	22–24 Sep	Carpet (i)	Victoria (CAN)	Ecuador	3–2	Win
1996	Americas Zone Group I, Quarterfinals	9–11 Feb	Hard	Valencia (VEN)	Venezuela	2–3	Loss
1996	Americas Zone, Relegation Play-offs	5–7 Apr	Carpet (i)	Edmonton (CAN)	Chile	3–2	Win
1997	Americas Zone Group I, Quarterfinals	7–9 Feb	Hard (i)	Montreal (CAN)	Bahamas	4–1	Win
1997	Americas Zone Group I, Semifinals	4–6 Apr	Hard (i)	Montreal (CAN)	Venezuela	5–0	Win
1997	World Group, Relegation Play-offs	19–21 Sep	Carpet (i)	Montreal (CAN)	Slovakia	1–4	Loss
1998	Americas Zone Group I, Quarterfinals	13–15 Feb	Hard (i)	Halifax (CAN)	Mexico	3–2	Win
1998	Americas Zone Group I, Semifinals	3–5 Apr	Clay	Guayaquil (ECU)	Ecuador	2–3	Loss
1999	Americas Zone Group I, Quarterfinals	12–14 Feb	Clay	Cali (COL)	Colombia	2–3	Loss
1999	Americas Zone, Relegation Play-offs	16–18 Jul	Hard	Nassau (BAH)	Bahamas	4–1	Win

=== 2000s ===
Year	Competition	Date	Surface	Location	Opponent	Score	Result
2000	Americas Zone Group I, Quarterfinals	4–6 Feb	Clay	Viña del Mar (CHI)	Chile	1–4	Loss
2000	Americas Zone Group I, Relegation Play-off	21–23 Jul	Hard	Montreal (CAN)	Argentina	4–1	Win
2001	Americas Zone Group I, Semifinals	6–8 Apr	Clay	Córdoba (ARG)	Argentina	0–5	Loss
2001	Americas Zone Group I, Relegation Play-off	20–22 Jul	Clay	Mexico City (MEX)	Mexico	3–2	Win
2002	Americas Zone Group I, Quarterfinals	8–10 Feb	Carpet (i)	Ontario (CAN)	Mexico	4–1	Win
2002	Americas Zone Group I, Semifinals	5–7 Apr	Carpet (i)	Calgary (CAN)	Chile	5–0	Win
2002	World Group, Relegation Play-offs	20–22 Sep	Clay	Rio de Janeiro (BRA)	Brazil	0–4	Loss
2003	Americas Zone Group I, 2nd Round	4–6 Apr	Carpet (i)	Calgary (CAN)	Peru	5–0	Win
2003	World Group, Relegation Play-offs	19–21 Sep	Carpet (i)	Calgary (CAN)	Brazil	3–2	Win
2004	World Group, 1st Round	6–8 Feb	Clay (i)	Maastricht (NED)	Netherlands	1–4	Loss
2004	World Group, Relegation Play-offs	24–26 Sep	Clay	Bucharest (ROU)	Romania	1–4	Loss
2005	Americas Zone Group I, 2nd Round	29 Apr – 1 May	Clay	Valencia (VEN)	Venezuela	4–0	Win
2005	World Group, Relegation Play-offs	23–25 Sep	Hard	Toronto (CAN)	Belarus	2–3	Loss
2006	Americas Zone Group I, 2nd Round	7–9 Apr	Clay	Mexico City (MEX)	Mexico	1–4	Loss
2006	Americas Zone, Relegation Play-offs	21–23 Jul	Hard	Granby (CAN)	Venezuela	3–2	Win
2007	Americas Zone Group I, 1st Round	9–11 Feb	Carpet (i)	Calgary (CAN)	Colombia	5–0	Win
2007	Americas Zone Group I, 2nd Round	6–8 Apr	Clay	Florianópolis (BRA)	Brazil	1–3	Loss
2008	Americas Zone Group I, 1st Round	8–10 Feb	Carpet (i)	Calgary (CAN)	Mexico	4–1	Win
2008	Americas Zone Group I, 2nd Round	11–13 Apr	Clay	Santiago de Chile (CHI)	Chile	2–3	Loss
2009	Americas Zone Group I, 1st Round	6–8 Mar	Hard (i)	Toronto (CAN)	Ecuador	2–3	Loss
2009	Americas Zone, Relegation Play-offs	10–12 Jul	Clay	Lima (PER)	Peru	3–2	Win

=== 2010s ===
Year	Competition	Date	Surface	Location	Opponent	Score	Result
2010	Americas Zone Group I, 2nd Round	5–7 Mar	Clay	Bogotá (COL)	Colombia	1–4	Loss
2010	Americas Zone, Relegation Play-offs	17–19 Sep	Hard	Toronto (CAN)	Dominican Republic	5–0	Win
2011	Americas Zone Group I, 1st Round	4–6 Mar	Clay	Metepec (MEX)	Mexico	4–1	Win
2011	Americas Zone Group I, 2nd Round	8–10 Jul	Clay	Guayaquil (ECU)	Ecuador	3–2	Win
2011	World Group, Relegation Play-offs	16–18 Sep	Hard	Ramat HaSharon (ISR)	Israel	3–2	Win
2012	World Group, 1st Round	10–12 Feb	Hard (i)	Vancouver (CAN)	France	1–4	Loss
2012	World Group, Relegation Play-offs	14–16 Sep	Hard	Montreal (CAN)	South Africa	4–1	Win
2013	World Group, 1st Round	1–3 Feb	Hard (i)	Vancouver (CAN)	Spain	3–2	Win
2013	World Group, Quarterfinals	5–7 Apr	Hard (i)	Vancouver (CAN)	Italy	3–1	Win
2013	World Group, Semifinals	13–15 Sep	Clay (i)	Belgrade (SRB)	Serbia	2–3	Loss
2014	World Group, 1st Round	31 Jan – 2 Feb	Hard (i)	Tokyo (JPN)	Japan	1–4	Loss
2014	World Group, Relegation Play-offs	12–14 Sep	Hard (i)	Halifax (CAN)	Colombia	3–2	Win
2015	World Group, 1st Round	6–8 Mar	Hard (i)	Vancouver (CAN)	Japan	3–2	Win
2015	World Group, Quarterfinals	17–19 Jul	Clay	Ostend (BEL)	Belgium	0–5	Loss
2016	World Group, 1st Round	4–6 Mar	Clay	Baie-Mahault (FRA)	France	0–5	Loss
2016	World Group, Relegation Play-offs	16–18 Sep	Hard (i)	Halifax (CAN)	Chile	5–0	Win
2017	World Group, 1st Round	3–5 Feb	Hard (i)	Ottawa (CAN)	Great Britain	2–3	Loss
2017	World Group, Relegation Play-offs	15–17 Sep	Hard (i)	Edmonton (CAN)	India	3–2	Win
2018	World Group, 1st Round	2–4 Feb	Clay (i)	Osijek (CRO)	Croatia	1–3	Loss
2018	World Group, Relegation Play-offs	14–16 Sep	Hard (i)	Toronto (CAN)	Netherlands	3–1	Win
2019	Qualifying round	1–2 Feb	Clay (i)	Bratislava (SVK)	Slovakia	3–2	Win
2019	Finals (Group F)	18 Nov	Hard (i)	Madrid (ESP)	Italy	2–1	Win
2019	Finals (Group F)	19 Nov	Hard (i)	Madrid (ESP)	United States	2–1	Win
2019	Finals (Quarterfinals)	21 Nov	Hard (i)	Madrid (ESP)	Australia	2–1	Win
2019	Finals (Semifinals)	23 Nov	Hard (i)	Madrid (ESP)	Russia	2–1	Win
2019	Finals (Final)	24 Nov	Hard (i)	Madrid (ESP)	Spain	0–2	Runner-up

=== 2020s ===
Year	Competition	Date	Surface	Location	Opponent	Score	Result
2020–21	Finals (Group B)	25 Nov	Hard (i)	Madrid (ESP)	Sweden	0–3	Loss
2020–21	Finals (Group B)	28 Nov	Hard (i)	Madrid (ESP)	Kazakhstan	0–3	Loss
2022	Qualifying round	4–5 Mar	Clay (i)	The Hague (NED)	Netherlands	0–4	Loss
2022	Finals (Group B)	13 Sep	Hard (i)	Valencia (ESP)	South Korea	2–1	Win
2022	Finals (Group B)	16 Sep	Hard (i)	Valencia (ESP)	Spain	2–1	Win
2022	Finals (Group B)	17 Sep	Hard (i)	Valencia (ESP)	Serbia	1–2	Loss
2022	Finals (Quarterfinals)	24 Nov	Hard (i)	Málaga (ESP)	Germany	2–1	Win
2022	Finals (Semifinals)	26 Nov	Hard (i)	Málaga (ESP)	Italy	2–1	Win
2022	Finals (Final)	27 Nov	Hard (i)	Málaga (ESP)	Australia	2–0	Champion
2023	Finals (Group A)	13 Sep	Hard (i)	Bologna (ITA)	Italy	3–0	Win
2023	Finals (Group A)	14 Sep	Hard (i)	Bologna (ITA)	Sweden	3–0	Win
2023	Finals (Group A)	16 Sep	Hard (i)	Bologna (ITA)	Chile	2–1	Win
2023	Finals (Quarterfinals)	21 Nov	Hard (i)	Málaga (ESP)	Finland	1–2	Loss
2024	Qualifying round	2–3 Feb	Hard (i)	Montreal (CAN)	South Korea	3–1	Win
2024	Finals (Group D)	10 Sep	Hard (i)	Manchester (GBR)	Argentina	2–1	Win
2024	Finals (Group D)	12 Sep	Hard (i)	Manchester (GBR)	Finland	3–0	Win
2024	Finals (Group D)	15 Sep	Hard (i)	Manchester (GBR)	Great Britain	2–1	Win
2024	Finals (Quarterfinals)	20 Nov	Hard (i)	Málaga (ESP)	Germany	0–2	Loss
2025	Qualifiers first round	1–2 Feb	Hard (i)	Montreal (CAN)	Hungary	2–3	Loss
2025	World Group I	12–14 Sep	Hard (i)	Halifax (CAN)	Israel	4–0	Win
2026	Qualifiers first round	6–7 Feb	Hard (i)	Vancouver (CAN)	Brazil	3–2	Win
2026	Qualifiers second round	18–19 Sep	Hard (i)	Quebec City (CAN)	France	3–1	Win
2026	Finals (Quarterfinals)	24 Nov	Hard (i)	Bologna (ITA)	Czech Republic	0–0	Pending

== Head-to-head record ==
Country	Record	Win %	Hard	Clay	Grass	Carpet
Caribbean/West Indies	7–0	100%	2–0	2–0	1–0	2–0
Cuba	7–2	78%	2–0	3–2	2–0	0–0
Mexico	7–18	28%	1–2	2–12	2–2	2–2
Venezuela	6–2	75%	5–2	1–0	0–0	0–0
Chile	6–4	60%	2–0	0–4	1–0	3–0
Colombia	6–4	60%	2–0	1–4	0–0	3–0
**Italy**	4–0	100%	4–0	0–0	0–0	0–0
Peru	3–0	100%	0–0	2–0	0–0	1–0
Netherlands	3–2	60%	2–0	1–2	0–0	0–0
Brazil	3–4	43%	1–0	0–3	0–1	2–0
Bahamas	2–0	100%	2–0	0–0	0–0	0–0
Israel	2–0	100%	2–0	0–0	0–0	0–0
**South Africa**	2–0	100%	1–0	0–0	1–0	0–0
South Korea	2–0	100%	2–0	0–0	0–0	0–0
Finland	2–1	67%	1–1	1–0	0–0	0–0
**Argentina**	2–2	50%	2–0	0–2	0–0	0–0
**Spain**	2–2	50%	2–1	0–1	0–0	0–0
Ecuador	2–5	29%	0–2	1–3	0–0	1–0
**Australia**	2–9	18%	2–0	0–2	0–7	0–0
Dominican Republic	1–0	100%	1–0	0–0	0–0	0–0
Haiti	1–0	100%	0–0	1–0	0–0	0–0
India	1–0	100%	1–0	0–0	0–0	0–0
Jamaica	1–0	100%	1–0	0–0	0–0	0–0
New Zealand	1–0	100%	0–0	1–0	0–0	0–0
Uruguay	1–0	100%	0–0	0–0	0–0	1–0
Belgium	1–1	50%	0–0	0–1	1–0	0–0
**Germany**	1–1	50%	1–1	0–0	0–0	0–0
Paraguay	1–1	50%	0–1	1–0	0–0	0–0
**Russia**	1–1	50%	1–0	0–1	0–0	0–0
Slovakia	1–1	50%	0–0	1–0	0–0	0–1
**Sweden**	1–2	33%	1–1	0–0	0–0	0–1
**Great Britain**	1–2	33%	1–1	0–1	0–0	0–0
**France**	1–3	25%	1–1	0–2	0–0	0–0
Japan	1–6	14%	1–1	0–0	0–5	0–0
**United States**	1–15	6%	1–1	0–5	0–9	0–0
Austria	0–1	0%	0–0	0–0	0–1	0–0
Belarus	0–1	0%	0–1	0–0	0–0	0–0
Hungary	0–1	0%	0–1	0–0	0–0	0–0
Kazakhstan	0–1	0%	0–1	0–0	0–0	0–0
**Croatia**	0–1	0%	0–0	0–1	0–0	0–0
Romania	0–1	0%	0–0	0–1	0–0	0–0
**Serbia**	0–2	0%	0–1	0–1	0–0	0–0
Overall win–loss	86–96	47%	45–19	18–48	8–25	15–4

*Previous champions in bold. Teams that have been ranked No. 1 in italics. Statistics as of September 20, 2026

== See also ==
- List of Canada Davis Cup team representatives
- Davis Cup
- Canada Billie Jean King Cup team
- Canada at the Hopman Cup
- 2022 ATP Cup
- Tennis Canada
