= 2021 Davis Cup Finals =

Men's tennis event

- Date: 25 November–5 December 2021
- Edition: 2nd
- Draw: 18 teams
- Surface: Hard indoor
- Location: Innsbruck, Austria; Madrid, Spain; Turin, Italy
- Venue: Olympiahalle; Madrid Arena; Pala Alpitour

Champions
- (Russia) RTF
- Davis Cup

The Finals, formerly known as World Group, was the highest level of Davis Cup competition in 2021. It was held on indoor hard courts at three venues in Innsbruck, Austria, Madrid, Spain and Turin, Italy. The 2020 edition was originally scheduled to take place from 23 until 29 November 2020. However, on 26 June 2020, ITF announced that 2020 Finals would take place from 22 until 28 November 2021 due to coronavirus pandemic and be named 2021 Davis Cup Finals. On 18 January 2021, ITF announced that the Finals would be expanded over 11 days, from 25 November to 5 December 2021. The ties were contested in a best-of-three rubbers format and played on one day. There were two singles followed by a doubles. Spain were the defending champions, but were eliminated in the round-robin stage. The Russian Tennis Federation won the title, defeating Croatia in the final. Andrey Rublev was named the Most Valuable Player of the tournament after going 6–1 in both singles and doubles.

== Participating teams ==
18 nations take part in the Finals. The qualification was as follows:

- 4 semifinalists of the previous edition
- 2 wild card teams (announced by ITF on 23 November 2019 as France and Serbia)
- 12 winners of the qualifying round, in March 2020

=== Overview ===
H = Host nation, TH = Title holder, 2019F = Finalist from the 2019 tournament, 2019SF = Semi-finalists from the 2019 tournament, WC = Wild card

Participating teams
Australia	Austria (H)	Canada (2019F)	Colombia	Croatia	Czech Republic
Ecuador	France (WC)	Germany	Great Britain (2019SF)	Hungary	Italy (H)
Kazakhstan	RTF (2019SF)	Serbia (WC)	Spain (H, TH)	Sweden	United States

1. Note RUS: In accordance with the ban by the World Anti-Doping Agency (WADA) and a December 2020 decision by the Court of Arbitration for Sport (CAS), the team from Russia was not permitted to use the Russian name, flag, or anthem; it participated in the 2021 Davis Cup Finals as the team of the Russian Tennis Federation (RTF), and used the flag of the RTF.

=== Seeds ===
The seedings were based on the Davis Cup Ranking of 9 March. Spain, as 2019 champions, are seeded No. 1 and were drawn into Pool A. Canada, as 2019 runners-up, are seeded No. 2 and were drawn into Pool B. The four other highest-ranked nations (France, Croatia, USA and Serbia) are seeded 3–6. The nations in pot 2 were drawn randomly into position 2 and the nations in pot 3 were drawn randomly into position 3.

1. Spain (Round robin)
2. Canada (Round robin)
3. France (Round robin)
4. Croatia (Final)
5. United States (Round robin)
6. Serbia (Semifinals)
7. Germany (Semifinals)
8. Italy (Quarterfinals)
9. Great Britain (Quarterfinals)
10. Australia (Round robin)
11. Kazakhstan (Quarterfinals)
12. RTF (Champion)
13. Sweden (Quarterfinals)
14. Austria (Round robin)
15. Czech Republic (Round robin)
16. Colombia (Round robin)
17. Hungary (Round robin)
18. Ecuador (Round robin)

== Team nominations ==
SR = Singles ranking, DR = Doubles ranking. Rankings are as of 22 November 2021.

Australia
Player	SR	DR
Alex de Minaur	34	133
Alexei Popyrin	61	336
John Millman	72	197
Alex Bolt	135	743
John Peers	–	13
Captain: Lleyton Hewitt

Austria
Player	SR	DR
Dennis Novak	118	731
Jurij Rodionov	139	408
Gerald Melzer	287	476
Oliver Marach	–	45
Philipp Oswald	–	52
Captain: Stefan Koubek

Canada
Player	SR	DR
Vasek Pospisil	133	154
Brayden Schnur	234	280
Steven Diez	264	548
Peter Polansky	277	159
Captain: Frank Dancevic

Colombia
Player	SR	DR
Daniel Elahi Galán	111	577
Nicolás Mejía	275	415
Cristian Rodríguez	442	214
Juan Sebastián Cabal	–	10
Robert Farah	–	10
Captain: Alejandro Falla

Croatia
Player	SR	DR
Marin Čilić	30	419
Nino Serdarušić	242	233
Borna Gojo	276	449
Mate Pavić	–	1
Nikola Mektić	–	2
Captain: Vedran Martić

Czech Republic
Player	SR	DR
Jiří Veselý	82	334
Jiří Lehečka	138	232
Zdeněk Kolář	140	120
Tomáš Macháč	143	472
Captain: Jaroslav Navrátil

Ecuador
Player	SR	DR
Emilio Gómez	149	363
Roberto Quiroz	291	182
Diego Hidalgo	581	166
Cayetano March	701	552
Gonzalo Escobar	823	39
Captain: Raúl Viver

France
Player	SR	DR
Arthur Rinderknech	58	131
Adrian Mannarino	71	162
Richard Gasquet	86	–
Pierre-Hugues Herbert	110	8
Nicolas Mahut	400	5
Captain: Sébastien Grosjean

Germany
Player	SR	DR
Jan-Lennard Struff	51	68
Dominik Koepfer	54	105
Peter Gojowczyk	85	525
Kevin Krawietz	852	14
Tim Pütz	1196	18
Captain: Michael Kohlmann

Great Britain
Player	SR	DR
Cameron Norrie	12	148
Dan Evans	25	59
Liam Broady	128	243
Joe Salisbury	–	3
Neal Skupski	–	20
Captain: Leon Smith

Hungary
Player	SR	DR
Márton Fucsovics	40	311
Attila Balázs	131	900
Zsombor Piros	282	1432
Fábián Marozsán	359	566
Péter Nagy	765	508
Captain: Gábor Köves

Italy
Player	SR	DR
Jannik Sinner	10	130
Lorenzo Sonego	27	139
Fabio Fognini	37	107
Lorenzo Musetti	59	366
Simone Bolelli	885	25
Captain: Filippo Volandri

Kazakhstan
Player	SR	DR
Alexander Bublik	36	48
Dmitry Popko	178	444
Mikhail Kukushkin	183	128
Aleksandr Nedovyesov	534	72
Andrey Golubev	937	28
Captain: Yuri Schukin

RTF
Player	SR	DR
Daniil Medvedev	2	275
Andrey Rublev	5	74
Aslan Karatsev	18	90
Karen Khachanov	29	168
Evgeny Donskoy	173	646
Captain: Shamil Tarpishchev

Serbia
Player	SR	DR
Novak Djokovic	1	251
Dušan Lajović	33	205
Filip Krajinović	42	290
Miomir Kecmanović	68	274
Nikola Ćaćić	1540	36
Captain: Viktor Troicki

Spain
Player	SR	DR
Pablo Carreño Busta	20	196
Albert Ramos Viñolas	45	–
Pedro Martínez	60	88
Feliciano López	106	125
Marcel Granollers	312	7
Captain: Sergi Bruguera

Sweden
Player	SR	DR
Mikael Ymer	93	1449
Elias Ymer	171	391
Jonathan Mridha	511	822
André Göransson	–	64
Robert Lindstedt	–	184
Captain: Robin Söderling

United States
Player	SR	DR
John Isner	24	203
Reilly Opelka	26	146
Frances Tiafoe	38	161
Jack Sock	147	150
Rajeev Ram	–	4
Captain: Mardy Fish

== Format ==
The 18 teams were divided in six round robin groups of three teams each. The six group winners plus the two second-placed teams with the best records based on percentage of matches won (followed by percentage of sets won and then percentage of games won), qualified for the quarterfinals.

Date	Round	Number of teams
25 November – 28 November	Round robin	18 (6 groups of 3 teams)
29 November – 2 December	Quarterfinals	8 (6 group winners + 2 best second place)
3 December – 4 December	Semifinals	4
5 December	Final	2 (automatically qualified for 2022 Davis Cup Finals)

== Group stage ==
Qualified for the Knockout stage
Eliminated

=== Overview ===
T = Ties, M = Matches, S = Sets

Group	Winner				Runner-up				Third			
Group	Nation	T	M	S	Nation	T	M	S	Nation	T	M	S
A	RTF	2–0	5–1	11–5	Spain	1–1	4–2	9–7	Ecuador	0–2	0–6	4–12
B	Kazakhstan	2–0	5–1	10–5	Sweden	1–1	4–2	9–4	Canada	0–2	0–6	2–12
C	Great Britain	2–0	4–2	8–5	France	1–1	3–3	6–8	Czech Republic	0–2	2–4	7–8
D	Croatia	2–0	5–1	11–3	Australia	1–1	2–4	6–10	Hungary	0–2	2–4	6–10
E	Italy	2–0	4–2	9–5	Colombia	1–1	3–3	8–8	United States	0–2	2–4	5–9
F	Germany	2–0	4–2	8–5	Serbia	1–1	4–2	9–6	Austria	0–2	1–5	4–10

=== Group A ===
Pos.	Country	Ties	Matches	Sets	Sets %	Games	Games %
1	RTF	2–0	5–1	11–5	69%	86–60	59%
2	Spain	1–1	4–2	9–7	56%	83–81	51%
3	Ecuador	0–2	0–6	4–12	25%	65–93	41%

==== Spain vs. Ecuador ====
Spain
3
Madrid
26 November 2021

Ecuador
0

			1	2	3
1	(Spain) (Ecuador)	Feliciano López; Roberto Quiroz	6; 3	6; 3
2	(Spain) (Ecuador)	Pablo Carreño Busta; Emilio Gómez	5; 7	6; 3	7^{7} 6^{5}
3	(Spain) (Ecuador)	Pablo Carreño Busta / Marcel Granollers; Gonzalo Escobar / Diego Hidalgo	6; 4	6^{5} 7^{7}	7^{7} 6^{2}

==== RTF vs. Ecuador ====
RTF
3
Madrid
27 November 2021

Ecuador
0

			1	2	3
1	(Russia) (Ecuador)	Andrey Rublev; Roberto Quiroz	6; 3	4; 6	6; 1
2	(Russia) (Ecuador)	Daniil Medvedev; Emilio Gómez	6; 0	6; 2
3	(Russia) (Ecuador)	Aslan Karatsev / Andrey Rublev; Gonzalo Escobar / Diego Hidalgo	6; 4	4; 6	6; 4

==== Spain vs. RTF ====
Spain
1
Madrid
28 November 2021

RTF
2

			1	2	3
1	(Spain) (Russia)	Feliciano López; Andrey Rublev	2; 6	6; 3	6; 4
2	(Spain) (Russia)	Pablo Carreño Busta; Daniil Medvedev	2; 6	6^{3} 7^{7}
3	(Spain) (Russia)	Marcel Granollers / Feliciano López; Aslan Karatsev / Andrey Rublev	6; 4	2; 6	4; 6

=== Group B ===
Pos.	Country	Ties	Matches	Sets	Sets %	Games	Games %
1	Kazakhstan	2–0	5–1	10–5	67%	86–64	57%
2	Sweden	1–1	4–2	9–4	69%	66–60	52%
3	Canada	0–2	0–6	2–12	14%	59–87	40%

==== Canada vs. Sweden ====
Canada
0
Madrid
25 November 2021

Sweden
3

			1	2	3
1	(Canada) (Sweden)	Steven Diez; Elias Ymer	4; 6	2; 6
2	(Canada) (Sweden)	Vasek Pospisil; Mikael Ymer	4; 6	4; 6
3	(Canada) (Sweden)	Vasek Pospisil / Brayden Schnur; André Göransson / Robert Lindstedt	6^{5} 7^{7}	4; 6

==== Kazakhstan vs. Sweden ====
Kazakhstan
2
Madrid
27 November 2021

Sweden
1

			1	2	3
1	(Kazakhstan) (Sweden)	Mikhail Kukushkin; Elias Ymer	3; 6	6^{4} 7^{7}
2	(Kazakhstan) (Sweden)	Alexander Bublik; Mikael Ymer	3; 6	6; 4	6; 0
3	(Kazakhstan) (Sweden)	Andrey Golubev / Aleksandr Nedovyesov; André Göransson / Robert Lindstedt	6; 3	6; 3

==== Canada vs. Kazakhstan ====
Canada
0
Madrid
28 November 2021

Kazakhstan
3

			1	2	3
1	(Canada) (Kazakhstan)	Brayden Schnur; Mikhail Kukushkin	3; 6	7^{7} 6^{5}	5; 7
2	(Canada) (Kazakhstan)	Vasek Pospisil; Alexander Bublik	2; 6	6^{6} 7^{8}
3	(Canada) (Kazakhstan)	Peter Polansky / Brayden Schnur; Andrey Golubev / Aleksandr Nedovyesov	4; 6	7^{8} 6^{6}	1; 6

=== Group C ===
Pos.	Country	Ties	Matches	Sets	Sets %	Games	Games %
1	Great Britain	2–0	4–2	8–5	62%	64–56	53%
2	France	1–1	3–3	6–8	43%	70–70	50%
3	Czech Republic	0–2	2–4	7–8	47%	66–74	47%

==== France vs. Czech Republic ====
France
2
Innsbruck
25 November 2021

Czech Republic
1

			1	2	3
1	(France) (Czech Republic)	Richard Gasquet; Tomáš Macháč	6^{3} 7^{7}	2; 6
2	(France) (Czech Republic)	Adrian Mannarino; Jiří Veselý	6^{1} 7^{7}	6; 4	6; 2
3	(France) (Czech Republic)	Pierre-Hugues Herbert / Nicolas Mahut; Tomáš Macháč / Jiří Lehečka	3; 6	6; 4	6; 3

==== France vs. Great Britain ====
France
1
Innsbruck
27 November 2021

Great Britain
2

			1	2	3
1	(France) (United Kingdom)	Adrian Mannarino; Dan Evans	5; 7	4; 6
2	(France) (United Kingdom)	Arthur Rinderknech; Cameron Norrie	2; 6	6^{8} 7^{10}
3	(France) (United Kingdom)	Nicolas Mahut / Arthur Rinderknech; Joe Salisbury / Neal Skupski	6; 1	6; 4

==== Great Britain vs. Czech Republic ====
Great Britain
2
Innsbruck
28 November 2021

Czech Republic
1

			1	2	3
1	(United Kingdom) (Czech Republic)	Dan Evans; Tomáš Macháč	2; 6	5; 7
2	(United Kingdom) (Czech Republic)	Cameron Norrie; Jiří Lehečka	6; 1	2; 6	6; 1
3	(United Kingdom) (Czech Republic)	Joe Salisbury / Neal Skupski; Tomáš Macháč / Jiří Veselý	6; 4	6; 2

=== Group D ===
Pos.	Country	Ties	Matches	Sets	Sets %	Games	Games %
1	Croatia	2–0	5–1	11–3	79%	83–60	58%
2	Australia	1–1	2–4	6–10	38%	74–89	45%
3	Hungary	0–2	2–4	6–10	38%	79–87	48%

==== Croatia vs. Australia ====
Croatia
3
Turin
25 November 2021

Australia
0

			1	2	3
1	(Croatia) (Australia)	Borna Gojo; Alexei Popyrin	7^{7} 6^{5}	7; 5
2	(Croatia) (Australia)	Marin Čilić; Alex de Minaur	6; 1	5; 7	6; 4
3	(Croatia) (Australia)	Nikola Mektić / Mate Pavić; Alex de Minaur / John Peers	6; 3	6; 1

==== Australia vs. Hungary ====
Australia
2
Turin
27 November 2021

Hungary
1

			1	2	3
1	(Australia) (Hungary)	John Millman; Zsombor Piros	6; 4	4; 6	3; 6
2	(Australia) (Hungary)	Alex de Minaur; Márton Fucsovics	7; 5	2; 6	7^{7} 6^{2}
3	(Australia) (Hungary)	Alex Bolt / John Peers; Fábián Marozsán / Zsombor Piros	6; 3	6^{11} 7^{13}	6; 3

==== Croatia vs. Hungary ====
Croatia
2
Turin
28 November 2021

Hungary
1

			1	2	3
1	(Croatia) (Hungary)	Nino Serdarušić; Fábián Marozsán	6; 4	6; 4
2	(Croatia) (Hungary)	Marin Čilić; Zsombor Piros	6; 4	5; 7	4; 6
3	(Croatia) (Hungary)	Nikola Mektić / Mate Pavić; Fábián Marozsán / Péter Nagy	7^{8} 6^{6}	6; 2

=== Group E ===
Pos.	Country	Ties	Matches	Sets	Sets %	Games	Games %
1	Italy	2–0	4–2	9–5	64%	79–60	57%
2	Colombia	1–1	3–3	8–8	50%	79–78	50%
3	United States	0–2	2–4	5–9	36%	56–76	42%

==== United States vs. Italy ====
United States
1
Turin
26 November 2021

Italy
2

			1	2	3
1	(United States) (Italy)	Reilly Opelka; Lorenzo Sonego	3; 6	6^{4} 7^{7}
2	(United States) (Italy)	John Isner; Jannik Sinner	2; 6	0; 6
3	(United States) (Italy)	Rajeev Ram / Jack Sock; Fabio Fognini / Lorenzo Musetti	7^{7} 6^{5}	6; 2

==== Italy vs. Colombia ====
Italy
2
Turin
27 November 2021

Colombia
1

			1	2	3
1	(Italy) (Colombia)	Lorenzo Sonego; Nicolás Mejía	6^{5} 7^{7}	6; 4	6; 2
2	(Italy) (Colombia)	Jannik Sinner; Daniel Elahi Galán	7; 5	6; 0
3	(Italy) (Colombia)	Fabio Fognini / Jannik Sinner; Juan Sebastián Cabal / Robert Farah	2; 6	7; 5	6^{6} 7^{8}

==== United States vs. Colombia ====
United States
1
Turin
28 November 2021

Colombia
2

			1	2	3
1	(United States) (Colombia)	Frances Tiafoe; Nicolás Mejía	4; 6	6; 3	7^{9} 6^{7}
2	(United States) (Colombia)	John Isner; Daniel Elahi Galán	3; 6	6; 3	6^{5} 7^{7}
3	(United States) (Colombia)	Reilly Opelka / Jack Sock; Juan Sebastián Cabal / Robert Farah	0; 3			retired

Note: Cabal/Farah's retirement victory over Opelka/Sock counted as a 6–0, 6–0 win.

=== Group F ===
Pos.	Country	Ties	Matches	Sets	Sets %	Games	Games %
1	Germany	2–0	4–2	8–5	62%	67–69	49%
2	Serbia	1–1	4–2	9–6	60%	86–73	54%
3	Austria	0–2	1–5	4–10	29%	66–77	46%

==== Serbia vs. Austria ====
Serbia
3
Innsbruck
26 November 2021

Austria
0

			1	2	3
1	(Serbia) (Austria)	Dušan Lajović; Gerald Melzer	7^{7} 6^{5}	3; 6	7; 5
2	(Serbia) (Austria)	Novak Djokovic; Dennis Novak	6; 3	6; 2
3	(Serbia) (Austria)	Nikola Ćaćić / Filip Krajinović; Oliver Marach / Philipp Oswald	7^{7} 6^{4}	4; 6	6; 3

==== Serbia vs. Germany ====
Serbia
1
Innsbruck
27 November 2021

Germany
2

			1	2	3
1	(Serbia) (Germany)	Filip Krajinović; Dominik Koepfer	6^{4} 7^{7}	4; 6
2	(Serbia) (Germany)	Novak Djokovic; Jan-Lennard Struff	6; 2	6; 4
3	(Serbia) (Germany)	Nikola Ćaćić / Novak Djokovic; Kevin Krawietz / Tim Pütz	6^{5} 7^{7}	6; 3	6^{5} 7^{7}

==== Germany vs. Austria ====
Germany
2
Innsbruck
28 November 2021

Austria
1

			1	2	3
1	(Germany) (Austria)	Dominik Koepfer; Jurij Rodionov	1; 6	5; 7
2	(Germany) (Austria)	Jan-Lennard Struff; Dennis Novak	7; 5	6; 4
3	(Germany) (Austria)	Kevin Krawietz / Tim Pütz; Oliver Marach / Philipp Oswald	6; 3	6; 4

== Knockout stage ==
=== Bracket ===
Quarterfinals
2 December, Madrid
12	RTF	2
13	Sweden	0
30 November, Innsbruck
9	Great Britain	1
7	Germany	2
29 November, Turin
8	Italy	1
4	Croatia	2
1 December, Madrid
6	Serbia	2
11	Kazakhstan	1

Semifinals
4 December, Madrid
12	RTF	2
7	Germany	1
3 December, Madrid
4	Croatia	2
6	Serbia	1

Final
5 December, Madrid
12	RTF	2
4	Croatia	0

=== Quarterfinals ===
==== Italy vs. Croatia ====
Italy
1
Turin
29 November 2021

Croatia
2

			1	2	3
1	(Italy) (Croatia)	Lorenzo Sonego; Borna Gojo	6^{2} 7^{7}	6; 2	2; 6
2	(Italy) (Croatia)	Jannik Sinner; Marin Čilić	3; 6	7^{7} 6^{4}	6; 3
3	(Italy) (Croatia)	Fabio Fognini / Jannik Sinner; Nikola Mektić / Mate Pavić	3; 6	4; 6

==== Great Britain vs. Germany ====
Great Britain
1
Innsbruck
30 November 2021

Germany
2

			1	2	3
1	(United Kingdom) (Germany)	Dan Evans; Peter Gojowczyk	6; 2	6; 1
2	(United Kingdom) (Germany)	Cameron Norrie; Jan-Lennard Struff	6^{6} 7^{8}	6; 3	2; 6
3	(United Kingdom) (Germany)	Joe Salisbury / Neal Skupski; Kevin Krawietz / Tim Pütz	6^{10} 7^{12}	6^{5} 7^{7}

==== Serbia vs. Kazakhstan ====
Serbia
2
Madrid
1 December 2021

Kazakhstan
1

			1	2	3
1	(Serbia) (Kazakhstan)	Miomir Kecmanović; Mikhail Kukushkin	6^{5} 7^{7}	6; 4	6^{11} 7^{13}
2	(Serbia) (Kazakhstan)	Novak Djokovic; Alexander Bublik	6; 3	6; 4
3	(Serbia) (Kazakhstan)	Nikola Ćaćić / Novak Djokovic; Andrey Golubev / Aleksandr Nedovyesov	6; 2	2; 6	6; 3

==== RTF vs. Sweden ====
RTF
2
Madrid
2 December 2021

Sweden
0

			1	2	3
1	(Russia) (Sweden)	Andrey Rublev; Elias Ymer	6; 2	5; 7	7^{7} 6^{3}
2	(Russia) (Sweden)	Daniil Medvedev; Mikael Ymer	6; 4	6; 4
3	(Russia) (Sweden)	Aslan Karatsev / Andrey Rublev; André Göransson / Robert Lindstedt				not played

=== Semifinals ===
==== Croatia vs. Serbia ====
Croatia
2
Madrid
3 December 2021

Serbia
1

			1	2	3
1	(Croatia) (Serbia)	Borna Gojo; Dušan Lajović	4; 6	6; 3	6; 2
2	(Croatia) (Serbia)	Marin Čilić; Novak Djokovic	4; 6	2; 6
3	(Croatia) (Serbia)	Nikola Mektić / Mate Pavić; Novak Djokovic / Filip Krajinović	7; 5	6; 1

==== RTF vs. Germany ====
RTF
2
Madrid
4 December 2021

Germany
1

			1	2	3
1	(Russia) (Germany)	Andrey Rublev; Dominik Koepfer	6; 4	6; 0
2	(Russia) (Germany)	Daniil Medvedev; Jan-Lennard Struff	6; 4	6; 4
3	(Russia) (Germany)	Aslan Karatsev / Karen Khachanov; Kevin Krawietz / Tim Pütz	6; 4	3; 6	4; 6

=== Final ===
==== RTF vs. Croatia ====
RTF
2
Madrid
5 December 2021

Croatia
0

			1	2	3
1	(Russia) (Croatia)	Andrey Rublev; Borna Gojo	6; 4	7^{7} 6^{5}
2	(Russia) (Croatia)	Daniil Medvedev; Marin Čilić	7^{9} 6^{7}	6; 2
3	(Russia) (Croatia)	Aslan Karatsev / Andrey Rublev; Nikola Mektić / Mate Pavić				not played
