= 2026 Davis Cup Finals =

Men's tennis event

- Date: 24–29 November 2026
- Edition: 7th
- Draw: 8 teams
- Surface: Hard / indoor
- Location: SuperTennis Arena, Bologna, Italy

2025 Champions
- Italy
- Davis Cup

The Finals (also called the Final 8) are the highest level of Davis Cup competition in 2026 and will be played from 24 to 29 November 2026. They will feature the host nation (Italy) and the seven winners from the Qualifiers second round. The ties will be contested in a best-of-three rubbers format and played on one day. There will be two singles matches followed, if necessary, by a doubles match.

== Bracket ==
All matches take place on indoor hard courts at the SuperTennis Arena, Bologna, Italy.

Quarterfinals
1	Italy
South Korea
4	Czech Republic
Canada
Great Britain
3	Germany
Austria
2	Spain

Semifinals

Final

== Team nominations ==
SR = Singles ranking, DR = Doubles ranking.
Rankings are as of 16 November 2026.

Austria
Player	SR	DR
Jurij Rodionov	121	–
Lukas Neumayer	153	677
Joel Schwärzler	169	476
Neil Oberleitner	966	13
Lucas Miedler	–	16
Captain: Jürgen Melzer

Canada
Player	SR	DR
Félix Auger-Aliassime	17	574
Liam Draxl	165	417
Alexis Galarneau	190	297
Keegan Rice	614	1585
Duncan Chan	672	250
Captain: Frank Dancevic

Czech Republic
Player	SR	DR
Jiří Lehečka	14	361
Jakub Menšík	15	579
Tomáš Macháč	60	245
Patrik Rikl	–	36
Adam Pavlásek	–	41
Captain: Tomáš Berdych

Germany
Player	SR	DR
Alexander Zverev	1	108
Jan-Lennard Struff	39	214
Yannick Hanfmann	67	281
Kevin Krawietz	–	11
Tim Pütz	–	12
Captain: Michael Kohlmann

Great Britain
Player	SR	DR
Arthur Fery	32	–
Cameron Norrie	52	–
Toby Samuel	92	–
Henry Patten	–	1
Neal Skupski	–	3
Captain: Leon Smith

Italy
Player	SR	DR
Flavio Cobolli	6	363
Luciano Darderi	21	191
Lorenzo Musetti	27	213
Matteo Berrettini	43	573
Andrea Vavassori	597	7
Captain: Filippo Volandri

South Korea
Player	SR	DR
Kwon Soon-woo	156	–
Chung Hyeon	607	–
Hong Seong-chan	800	–
Park Ui-sung	806	265
Nam Ji-sung	929	123
Captain: Chung Jong-sam

Spain
Player	SR	DR
Carlos Alcaraz	3	–
Rafael Jódar	10	357
Daniel Mérida	42	–
Pedro Martínez	120	364
Marcel Granollers	–	6
Captain: David Ferrer

== Results ==
=== Quarterfinals ===
==== Italy vs. South Korea ====
Italy

SuperTennis Arena, Bologna
25 November 2026

South Korea

		1	2	3
1	(Italy) (South Korea)
2	(Italy) (South Korea)
3	(Italy) (South Korea)

==== Czech Republic vs. Canada ====
Czech Republic

SuperTennis Arena, Bologna
24 November 2026

Canada

		1	2	3
1	(Czech Republic) (Canada)
2	(Czech Republic) (Canada)
3	(Czech Republic) (Canada)

==== Great Britain vs. Germany ====
Great Britain

SuperTennis Arena, Bologna
26 November 2026

Germany

		1	2	3
1	(United Kingdom) (Germany)
2	(United Kingdom) (Germany)
3	(United Kingdom) (Germany)

==== Austria vs. Spain ====
Austria

SuperTennis Arena, Bologna
26 November 2026

Spain

		1	2	3
1	(Austria) (Spain)
2	(Austria) (Spain)
3	(Austria) (Spain)

=== Semifinals ===
==== TBD vs. TBD ====
[[Davis Cup team|]]

SuperTennis Arena, Bologna
27 November 2026

[[Davis Cup team|]]

	1	2	3
1
2
3

==== TBD vs. TBD ====
[[Davis Cup team|]]

SuperTennis Arena, Bologna
28 November 2026

[[Davis Cup team|]]

	1	2	3
1
2
3

=== Final ===
==== TBD vs. TBD ====
[[Davis Cup team|]]

SuperTennis Arena, Bologna
29 November 2026

[[Davis Cup team|]]

	1	2	3
1
2
3
