= 2026 Davis Cup Qualifiers second round =

Men's tennis tournament qualifiers

The 2026 Davis Cup qualifiers second round was held from 18 to 20 September 2026. The seven winners of this round qualified for the 2026 Davis Cup Finals (also known as the Final 8) while the seven losers play at the 2027 Davis Cup Qualifiers first round.

== Teams ==
Fourteen teams played for seven spots in the Finals, in series decided on a home and away basis.

These fourteen teams were:

- The runners-up of the 2025 Davis Cup (Spain; promoted since 2025 champions Italy will host the Finals)
- 13 winners of the Qualifiers first round, held in February 2026

The 7 winning teams went on to play in the Finals alongside the host nation Italy.

== Results summary ==
Home team	Score	Away team	Location	Venue	Surface
Chile	0–4	Spain [1]	Santiago	Estadio Nacional	Clay
Germany [2]	3–1	Croatia [13]	Halle	Heristo Arena	Hard (i)
Great Britain [12]	4–0	Ecuador	London	Copper Box Arena	Hard (i)
Austria [11]	3–1	Belgium [4]	Vienna	Wiener Athletic Club	Clay
South Korea	3–1	India	Seoul	Seoul Olympic Park Tennis Center	Hard
Czechia [9]	3–2	United States [6]	Prague	O_{2} Arena	Hard (i)
Canada [8]	3–1	France [7]	Quebec City	Centre Vidéotron	Hard (i)

== Results ==
=== Chile vs. Spain ===
Chile
0
Estadio Nacional, Santiago, Chile
19–20 September
Clay

Spain
4

			1	2	3
1	(Chile) (Spain)	Alejandro Tabilo; Daniel Mérida	7; 5	3; 6	3; 6
2	(Chile) (Spain)	Cristian Garín; Rafael Jódar	0; 6	2; 6
3	(Chile) (Spain)	Tomás Barrios Vera / Alejandro Tabilo; Pedro Martínez / Jaume Munar	0; 6	3; 6
4	(Chile) (Spain)	Matías Soto; Martín Landaluce	2; 6	3; 6
5	(Chile) (Spain)	Cristian Garín; Daniel Mérida				not played

=== Germany vs. Croatia ===
Germany
3
Heristo Arena, Halle, Germany
19–20 September
Hard (i)

Croatia
1

			1	2	3
1	(Germany) (Croatia)	Alexander Zverev; Matej Dodig	6; 4	7^{7} 6^{3}
2	(Germany) (Croatia)	Daniel Altmaier; Dino Prižmić	4; 6	3; 6
3	(Germany) (Croatia)	Kevin Krawietz / Tim Pütz; Nikola Mektić / Mate Pavić	7; 5	6; 2
4	(Germany) (Croatia)	Alexander Zverev; Dino Prižmić	6; 2	6; 4
5	(Germany) (Croatia)	Daniel Altmaier; Matej Dodig				not played

=== Great Britain vs. Ecuador ===
Great Britain
4
Copper Box Arena, London, Great Britain
19–20 September
Hard (i)

Ecuador
0

			1	2	3
1	(United Kingdom) (Ecuador)	Toby Samuel; Andy Andrade	4; 6	6; 4	6; 1
2	(United Kingdom) (Ecuador)	Arthur Fery; Álvaro Guillén Meza	7; 5	6; 0
3	(United Kingdom) (Ecuador)	Henry Patten / Neal Skupski; Gonzalo Escobar / Diego Hidalgo	6; 3	6; 4
4	(United Kingdom) (Ecuador)	Harry Wendelken; Ángel Véliz	6; 2	6; 3
5	(United Kingdom) (Ecuador)	Toby Samuel; Álvaro Guillén Meza				not played

=== Austria vs. Belgium ===
Austria
3
Wiener Athletic Club, Vienna, Austria
18–19 September
Clay

Belgium
1

			1	2	3
1	(Austria) (Belgium)	Jurij Rodionov; Gauthier Onclin	6; 4	6; 1
2	(Austria) (Belgium)	Lukas Neumayer; Zizou Bergs	6; 2	4; 6	2; 6
3	(Austria) (Belgium)	Lucas Miedler / Neil Oberleitner; Sander Gillé / Joran Vliegen	7^{7} 6^{5}	7; 5
4	(Austria) (Belgium)	Jurij Rodionov; Zizou Bergs	7^{8} 6^{6}	6; 3
5	(Austria) (Belgium)	Lukas Neumayer; Gauthier Onclin				not played

=== South Korea vs. India ===
South Korea
3
Seoul Olympic Park Tennis Center, Seoul, South Korea
18–19 September
Hard

India
1

			1	2	3
1	(South Korea) (India)	Kwon Soon-woo; Dhakshineswar Suresh	3; 6	6; 3	6; 4
2	(South Korea) (India)	Chung Hyeon; Sumit Nagal	2; 6	6; 4	7; 5
3	(South Korea) (India)	Nam Ji-sung / Park Ui-sung; Sriram Balaji / Dhakshineswar Suresh	3; 6	6; 3	3; 6
4	(South Korea) (India)	Kwon Soon-woo; Sumit Nagal	6; 1	6; 2
5	(South Korea) (India)	Chung Hyeon; Dhakshineswar Suresh				not played

=== Czechia vs. United States ===
Czech Republic
3
O_{2} Arena, Prague, Czech Republic
18–19 September
Hard (i)

United States
2

			1	2	3
1	(Czech Republic) (United States)	Jakub Menšík; Learner Tien	2; 6	4; 6
2	(Czech Republic) (United States)	Jiří Lehečka; Ben Shelton	6; 4	6; 4
3	(Czech Republic) (United States)	Adam Pavlásek / Patrik Rikl; Christian Harrison / Austin Krajicek	7; 5	3; 6	6^{8} 7^{10}
4	(Czech Republic) (United States)	Jakub Menšík; Ben Shelton	5; 7	6; 4	6; 3
5	(Czech Republic) (United States)	Jiří Lehečka; Learner Tien	6; 3	7; 5

=== Canada vs. France ===
Canada
3
Centre Vidéotron, Quebec City, Canada
18–19 September
Hard (i)

France
1

			1	2	3
1	(Canada) (France)	Liam Draxl; Arthur Rinderknech	6; 2	7; 5
2	(Canada) (France)	Félix Auger-Aliassime; Quentin Halys	7^{7} 6^{5}	4; 6	6; 3
3	(Canada) (France)	Félix Auger-Aliassime / Duncan Chan; Benjamin Bonzi / Pierre-Hugues Herbert	6^{4} 7^{7}	3; 6
4	(Canada) (France)	Félix Auger-Aliassime; Arthur Rinderknech	4; 6	7^{7} 6^{5}	6; 4
5	(Canada) (France)	Liam Draxl; Quentin Halys				not played
