= José Luis Noriega =

Peruvian tennis player

- Full name: José Luis Noriega
- Country (sports): Peru
- Born: 14 September 1969 (age 55); Lima, Peru
- Height: 5 ft 10 in (178 cm)
- Prize money: $44,341

Singles
- Career record: 0–2
- Highest ranking: No. 161 (22 August 1994)

Doubles
- Career record: 0–1
- Highest ranking: No. 500 (7 June 1993)

José Luis Noriega (born 14 September 1969) is a former professional tennis player from Peru.

== Biography ==
Noriega, who grew up in the Peruvian capital Lima, was a four-time All-American collegiate tennis player at the University of San Diego (USD). Known by his nickname "Tato", he attended USD from 1989 to 1992 and amassed a 138–30 win-loss record across singles and doubles.

From 1992 to 1994 he competed on the professional tennis tour, where he had a best ranking of 161 in the world. He won a Challenger title in Brazil in 1993 and made the final round of US Open qualifying the following year. His two ATP Tour main draw appearances for singles came at the 1994 Volvo International in New Haven and the Colombia Open in the same year.

He featured in a total of nine Davis Cup ties for Peru, the last in 1996.

== Challenger titles ==
=== Singles: (1) ===
No.	Year	Tournament	Surface	Opponent	Score
1.	1993	Cotia, Brazil	Hard	(Brazil) Danilo Marcelino	3–6, 7–6, 6–1

== See also ==
- List of Peru Davis Cup team representatives
