= Américo Venero =

French-born Peruvian tennis player

- Full name: Américo Túpac Amaru Venero Montes
- Country (sports): Peru
- Born: 22 February 1972 (age 53); Paris, France
- Height: 5 ft 9 in (175 cm)
- Plays: Left-handed
- Prize money: $21,339

Singles
- Highest ranking: No. 297 (12 Oct 1992)

Doubles
- Career record: 0–1 (ATP Tour)
- Highest ranking: No. 232 (29 Jul 1996)
Medal record
Pan American Games
Bronze medal – third place	1991 Havana	Men's doubles
South American Games
Gold medal – first place	1990 Lima	Men's singles
Gold medal – first place	1990 Lima	Men's team
Silver medal – second place	1990 Lima	Mixed doubles
Bronze medal – third place	1990 Lima	Men's doubles
Bronze medal – third place	1998 Cuenca	Men's singles
Bronze medal – third place	1998 Cuenca	Men's doubles
Bronze medal – third place	1998 Cuenca	Men's team

Américo Túpac Amaru "Tupi" Venero Montes (born 22 February 1972) is a French-born Peruvian former professional tennis player.

A left-handed player, Venero represented the Peru Davis Cup team between 1995 and 2000, winning seven singles and five doubles rubbers. He won the deciding fifth rubber in the 1999 American Zone Group II final, over Mexico's Luis Herrera, to give Peru promotion.

Venero was the 1990 South American Games singles champion and won a bronze medal at the 1991 Pan American Games, partnering Patrick Baumeler in the men's doubles competition. This was Peru's first ever Pan American Games medal for tennis.

His only main draw appearance on the ATP Tour was in doubles at the 1996 Hellmann's Cup in Santiago and he won one ATP Challenger title during his career, which was also in doubles.

Venero began his first stint as Peru's Davis Cup captain in 2002 soon after retirement and is the current team captain as of 2020.

== Challenger titles ==
=== Doubles: (1) ===
No.	Date	Tournament	Surface	Partner	Opponents	Score
1.	October, 1995	Lima, Peru	Clay	(Peru) Jaime Yzaga	(Venezuela) Juan Carlos Bianchi (Egypt) Tamer El-Sawy	6–3, 6–4

== See also ==
- List of Peru Davis Cup team representatives
