= Ismael Sauce =

Venezuelan tennis player (born 1951)

- Country (sports): Venezuela
- Born: 6 November 1951 (age 74) Caracas, Venezuela
Medal record
Central American and Caribbean Games
Gold medal – first place	1978 Medellín	Men's doubles

Ismael Sauce (born 6 November 1951) is a Venezuelan former tennis player.

Born in Caracas, Sauce represented Venezuela at the 1975 Pan American Games and in two editions of the Bolivarian Games. He was a men's doubles gold medalist at the 1978 Central American and Caribbean Games, partnering Juan Bóveda.

In 1981 he competed in his two career Davis Cup ties for Venezuela. He debuted in the America Zone semi-final against the Caribbean, winning a doubles rubber, then played doubles and reverse singles in the final against Colombia, losing both rubbers.
