= List of Peru Davis Cup team representatives =

Peru just entered the World Group in 2007, after winning the tie against Belarus. In 2008, his debut in the World Group of Cup Davis, was against Spain. It was 5-0 for the Spanish team and Peru just returned to the Zone groups.

== Players ==
Player	W-L (Total)	W-L (Singles)	W-L (Doubles)	Ties	Debut
Luis Horna	38–19	28–7	10–12	26	1995
Iván Miranda	27–34	18–21	9–13	31	1998
Jaime Yzaga	41–27	28–17	13–10	27	1984
Pablo Arraya	11–15	11–11	0–4	13	1980
Carlos di Laura	11–14	2–9	9–5	19	1981
Duilio Beretta	12–10	6–7	6–3	10	2010
Mauricio Echazú	10–12	10–11	0–1	18	2004
Sergio Galdós	12–6	5–1	7–5	12	2009
Alejandro Aramburú	12–14	12–14	0–0	15	1989
Matías Silva	0–0	0–0	0–0	0	1997
Tomás Gonzáles	0–0	0–0	0–0	0	1924
Alfredo Acuña	0–5	0–4	0–1	2	1968
Diego Acuña	0–3	0–2	0–1	2	2003
Salomón Velazco	0–0	0–0	0–0	0	2004
Fernando Maynetto	0–0	0–0	0–0	0	2004
Miguel Maúrtua	0–0	0–0	0–0	0	1947
Alex Olmedo	0–0	0–0	0–0	0	2000
Christian Honhold	0–0	0–0	0–0	0	1975
Alberto Franco	0–0	0–0	0–0	0	1971
Luciano Cúneo	1–0	1–0	0–0	1	1982
L.C.Málaga	0–0	0–0	0–0	0	1934
José Luis Noriega	8–11	1–9	7–2	9	1991
Américo Venero	12–14	7–8	5–6	13	1995
C.Reaño	0–0	0–0	0–0	0	2004
Mario Monroy	0–0	0–0	0–0	0	2002
Patrick Boza	0–0	0–0	0–0	0	1997
Rodrigo Sánchez	0–1	0–0	0–1	1	2014
Jorge Brian Panta	1–2	1–2	0–0	3	2012
Jorge Salkeld	0–0	0–0	0–0	0	1959
Alvaro Raposo de Oliveira	0–0	0–0	0–0	0	1928
