= Carlos Behar =

Colombian tennis player

- Country (sports): Colombia
- Born: 29 January 1956 (age 70) Bogotá, Colombia
- Plays: Right-handed

Singles
- Career record: 0–2
- Highest ranking: No. 283 (26 Dec 1979)

Grand Slam singles results
- Wimbledon: Q1 (1978)

Doubles
- Career record: 4–8
- Highest ranking: No. 160 (26 Dec 1979)

Grand Slam doubles results
- French Open: 1R (1978, 1980)
- Wimbledon: Q2 (1978)
- US Open: 1R (1980)

Carlos Behar (born 29 January 1956) is a Colombian former professional tennis player.

== Tennis career ==
Behar, born in Bogotá, had a father who was national champion multiple times and attended South Carolina's Presbyterian College on a scholarship. He was the 1977 NAIA singles championship runner-up.

A serve and volley player, Behar began competing on the professional tour in 1977. He featured in doubles main draws at the French Open and US Open during his career. In 1981 he played in Davis Cup ties for Colombia against Canada and Venezuela, winning all of his rubbers.

Behar continues to compete on the ITF senior's circuit and in 2018 became the first Colombian to attain a number one ranking, which came in over 60s doubles.
