= Mark Greenan =

Canadian tennis player

- Country (sports): Canada
- Born: 30 June 1966 (age 59) Cambridge, Ontario, Canada
- Plays: Left-handed

Singles
- Career record: 0–2
- Highest ranking: No. 426 (July 29, 1985)

Grand Slam singles results
- Australian Open: Q3 (1985)

Doubles
- Career record: 0–6
- Highest ranking: No. 250 (July 28, 1986)

Mark Greenan (born 30 June 1966) is a Canadian former professional tennis player.

A left-handed player from Cambridge, Ontario, Greenan was a four-time national champion in doubles and played doubles on the Canada Davis Cup team from 1985 to 1987.

Greenan was All-American at Wake Forest University, where he played from 1984 to 1988. He made the NCAA doubles semi-finals in 1988 (with Christian Dallwitz) and was twice named All-ACC.

== See also ==
- List of Canada Davis Cup team representatives
