= Derek Segal =

South African tennis player

- Country (sports): South Africa; Canada
- Born: 7 May 1960 (age 65) Johannesburg, South Africa
- Height: 5 ft 10 in (178 cm)

Singles
- Career record: 0–5
- Highest ranking: No. 276 (2 Jan 1985)

Grand Slam singles results
- Wimbledon: Q2 (1974)
- US Open: 1R (1981)

Doubles
- Career record: 2–7
- Highest ranking: No. 270 (25 Mar 1985)

Derek Segal (born 7 May 1960) is a South African former professional tennis player.

Born in Johannesburg, Segal originally represented his native South Africa but switched allegiances to Canada in the late 1970s while he was based in the country. He now lives in the United States.

Segal appeared in the main draw of the 1981 US Open and played qualifiers at Wimbledon. He competed in two Davis Cup ties for Canada, against Mexico in 1984 and the Caribbean/West Indies in 1985.

== See also ==
- List of Canada Davis Cup team representatives
