= Álvaro Jordan =

Colombian tennis player

Jordan Mazuera, Álvaro
- Country (sports): Colombia
- Born: 8 January 1962 Cali, Colombia
- Died: January 11, 2001 (aged 39) Cali, Colombia
- Height: 1.85 m (6 ft 1 in)
- Plays: Right-handed
- Prize money: US$43,306

Singles
- Career record: 6–5
- Highest ranking: No. 226 (6 July 1992)

Grand Slam singles results
- Australian Open: DNP
- French Open: DNP
- Wimbledon: Q2 (1986)
- US Open: DNP

Doubles
- Career record: 4–8
- Highest ranking: No. 181 (4 May 1987)

Álvaro Jordan (8 January 1962 in Cali, Colombia – January 11, 2001) was a male tennis player from Colombia.

Jordan represented his native country in the doubles competition at the 1988 Summer Olympics in Seoul, South Korea, partnering Luis Arturo González. The pair was eliminated in the first round there, withdrawing prior to playing.

Jordan played in 15 Davis Cup ties for Colombia from 1984 to 1992, posting a 20–10 record in singles and a 6–7 record in doubles.

Jordan's highest ranking in singles was world No. 226, which he reached in July 1992. His highest doubles ranking was World No. 181, which he reached in May 1987.

Jordan died in Cali in 2001.
