= Ecuador Davis Cup team =

National sports team

Ecuador
- Nations Ranking: 25 ▼ (21 September 2026)
- Colors: Yellow and Blue
- First year: 1961
- Years played: 60
- Ties played (W–L): 127 (66–61)
- Years in World Group: 8 (3–9)
- Best finish: QF (1985)
- Most total wins: Nicolás Lapentti (61–34)
- Most singles wins: Nicolás Lapentti (41–16)
- Most doubles wins: Andrés Gómez (20–15); Nicolás Lapentti (20–18)
- Best doubles team: Andrés Gómez/Ricardo Ycaza (9–3)
- Most ties played: Nicolás Lapentti (38)
- Most years played: Andrés Gómez; Nicolás Lapentti (17)

The Ecuador men's national tennis team represents Ecuador in Davis Cup tennis competition and are governed by the Ecuador Tennis Federation.

Ecuador currently compete in the Americas Zone of Group I. Their best performance was in 1985, when they advanced to the quarterfinals in the World Group.

== History ==
Ecuador competed in its first Davis Cup in 1961.

== Results and fixtures ==
The following are lists of match results and scheduled matches for the current year.

Win Loss Fixture

=== 2026 ===
Qualifiers
First round

Ecuador
3
Quito Tennis and Golf Club, Quito, Ecuador
7–8 February 2026
Clay

Australia
1

			1	2	3
1	(Ecuador) (Australia)	Álvaro Guillén Meza; Rinky Hijikata	6; 4	1; 6	6; 4
2	(Ecuador) (Australia)	Andrés Andrade; James Duckworth	3; 6	6; 3	7; 5
3	(Ecuador) (Australia)	Gonzalo Escobar / Diego Hidalgo; Rinky Hijikata / Jordan Thompson	7^{7} 6^{5}	6; 4
4	(Ecuador) (Australia)	Emilio Camacho; Jason Kubler	4; 6	2; 6
5	(Ecuador) (Australia)	Andrés Andrade; Rinky Hijikata				not played

Qualifiers
Second round

Great Britain
4
Copper Box Arena, London, Great Britain
19–20 September 2026
Hard (i)

Ecuador
0

			1	2	3
1	(United Kingdom) (Ecuador)	Toby Samuel; Andy Andrade	4; 6	6; 4	6; 1
2	(United Kingdom) (Ecuador)	Arthur Fery; Álvaro Guillén Meza	7; 5	6; 0
3	(United Kingdom) (Ecuador)	Henry Patten / Neal Skupski; Gonzalo Escobar / Diego Hidalgo	6; 3	6; 4
4	(United Kingdom) (Ecuador)	Harry Wendelken; Ángel Véliz	6; 2	6; 3
5	(United Kingdom) (Ecuador)	Toby Samuel; Álvaro Guillén Meza				not played

== Players ==
=== Current team ===
The following players were selected for the 2026 Davis Cup Qualifiers first round held in Quito, Ecuador Player information and rankings as of 6 February 2026 prior to the round.

Team nominations for Qualifiers first round against Australia.
Player	Born	ATP ranking		Debut	Nom	Ties	Win-loss			Davis Cup Profile
Player	Born	Singles	Doubles	Debut	Nom	Ties	Singles	Doubles	Total	Davis Cup Profile
Álvaro Guillén Meza	23	201	548	2023	6	6	4–3	–	4–3	
Andrés Andrade	27	257	413	2023	8	6	6–4	1–1	7–5	
Gonzalo Escobar	37	–	76	2013	21	19	5–3	8–7	13–10	
Diego Hidalgo	32	–	85	2012	16	16	1–1	8–8	9–9	
Emilio Camacho	16	–	1398	2026	1	1	0–1	–	0–1	
Non-playing captain: Raul Viver

== Historical results ==
=== 2000–2009 ===
2000–2009: 8 matches played, 7 wins, 1 loss
Match: Win Loss w/o Competition: Winners Finalists Semifinalists Quarterfinalists Rounds Zonal Group
Year	Competition	Date	Location	Opponent	Score	Result
2007	Americas Zone Group II First round	9–11 February	Guayaquil (ECU)	Netherlands Antilles	5–0	Won
2007	Americas Zone Group II Second round	6–8 April	Punta del Este (URU)	Uruguay	0–5	Lost
2008	Americas Zone Group II First round	8–10 February	Curaçao (NAT)	Netherlands Antilles	4–1	Won
2008	Americas Zone Group II Second round	11–13 April	Guayaquil (ECU)	Dominican Republic	4–1	Won
2008	Americas Zone Group II Third round	19–21 September	Lambaré (PAR)	Paraguay	3–2	Won
2009	Americas Zone Group I First round	6–8 March	Toronto (CAN)	Canada	3–2	Won
2009	Americas Zone Group I Second round	8–10 May	Quito (ECU)	Peru	4–1	Won
2009	World Group play-offs	18–20 September	Porto Alegre (BRA)	Brazil	3–2	Won

=== 2010–2021 ===
Year	Competition	Date	Location	Opponent	Score	Result
2010	World Group, 1st Round	5–7 March	Varaždin (CRO)	Croatia	0–5	Lost
2010	World Group play-offs	17–19 September	Bucharest (ROM)	Romania	0–5	Lost
2011	Americas Zone, Group I, 1st Round	4–6 March	bye			
2011	Americas Zone, Group I, 2nd Round	8–10 July	Guayaquil (ECU)	Canada	2–3	Lost
2011	Americas Zone, Group I, 1st Round Relegation Play-off	16–18 September	Guayaquil (ECU)	Mexico	3–2	Won
2012	Americas Zone, Group I, 1st Round	10–12 February	Salinas (ECU)	Colombia	1–4	Lost
2012	Americas Zone, Group I, Regulation Play-off	14–16 September	Lima (PER)	Peru	4–1	Won
2013	Americas Zone, Group I, 1st Round	1–3 February	bye			
2013	Americas Zone, Group I, 2nd Round	5–7 April	Manta (ECU)	Chile	3–2	Won
2013	World Group play-offs	13–15 September	Neuchâtel (SUI)	Switzerland	1–4	Lost
2014	Americas Zone, Group I, 1st Round	31 January - 2 February	Guayaquil (ECU)	Venezuela	3–2	Won
2014	Americas Zone, Group I, 2nd Round	4–6 April	Guayaquil (ECU)	Brazil	1–3	Lost
2015	Americas Zone, Group I, 2nd Round	17–19 July	Santo Domingo (DOM)	Dominican Republic	2–3	Lost
2015	Americas Zone, Group I, 1st Round Relegation Play-off	18–20 September	Saint Michael (BAR)	Barbados	3–2	Won
2016	Americas Zone, Group I, 1st Round	4–6 March	Portoviejo (ECU)	Barbados	5–0	Won
2016	Americas Zone, Group I, 2nd Round	15–18 July	Belo Horizonte (BRA)	Brazil	1–3	Lost
2017	Americas Zone, Group I, 1st Round	3–5 February	Guayaquil (ECU)	Peru	5–0	Won
2017	Americas Zone, Group I, 2nd Round	7–9 April	Ambato (ECU)	Brazil	0–5	Lost
2018	Americas Zone, Group I, 1st Round	2–3 February	Santiago (CHI)	Chile	1–3	Lost
2018	Americas Zone, Group I, Relegation Play-off	14–15 September	Saint Michael (BAR)	Barbados	4–0	Won
2019	Americas Zone, Group I, 1st Round	14–15 September	Doral, Florida (USA)	Venezuela	4–0	Won
2021	Qualifying Round	6–7 March	Miki (JPN)	Japan	3–0	Won

== See also ==
- Davis Cup
- Ecuador Billie Jean King Cup team
