= Iñaki Calvo =

Venezuelan tennis player (born 1960)

- Country (sports): Venezuela
- Born: 23 March 1960 (age 66) Caracas, Venezuela

Singles
- Career record: 1–3 (Davis Cup)
- Highest ranking: No. 373 (5 May 1986)

Grand Slam singles results
- Wimbledon: Q1 (1986)

Doubles
- Career record: 4–3 (Davis Cup)
- Highest ranking: No. 275 (19 May 1986)
Medal record
Central American and Caribbean Games
Gold medal – first place	1982 Havana	Mixed doubles
Bronze medal – third place	1982 Havana	Men's doubles
Pan American Games
Gold medal – first place	1983 Caracas	Mixed doubles
Bronze medal – third place	1983 Caracas	Men's doubles

Iñaki Calvo (born 23 March 1960) is a Venezuelan former professional tennis player.

== Career ==
Born in Caracas, Calvo played for the Venezuela Davis Cup team during the 1980s, appearing in a total of seven ties. He also represented his country in regional multi-sport events, with gold medal wins in mixed doubles at both the 1982 Central American and Caribbean Games and 1983 Pan American Games.

Calvo was a collegiate tennis player for the University of Maryland and their first ever to win the ACC Tournament MVP, which he did as a senior in 1984.

On the professional tour, Calvo reached a career high singles ranking of 373 and featured in the qualifying draw for the 1986 Wimbledon Championships.
