= Martin Wostenholme =

Canadian tennis player

- Country (sports): Canada
- Born: October 11, 1962 (age 62); Toronto, Canada
- Height: 6 ft 0 in (183 cm)
- Plays: Right-handed
- Prize money: $298,147

Singles
- Career record: 49–84
- Highest ranking: No. 84 (November 11, 1985)

Grand Slam singles results
- Australian Open: 2R (1990)
- French Open: 2R (1986)
- Wimbledon: 2R (1986)
- US Open: 2R (1985)

Doubles
- Career record: 3–14
- Highest ranking: No. 312 (September 9, 1985)

Martin Wostenholme (born October 11, 1962) is a Canadian former touring professional tennis and Davis Cup player. A right-handed predominantly baseline player, Wostenholme was from 1981 to 1984 a four-time All-Ivy Leaguer in singles at Yale University. He had a career ATP singles high ranking of world No. 84, which he attained in November 1985. His career ATP tour win-lost record stands at 49 and 84.

Wostenholme had his best results on clay; a semi-finals appearance at the Guarujá, Brazil Grand Prix event in 1988 and 1991; a quarter-finals showing in the Stuttgart Outdoor Grand Prix event in 1989; and a semi-finalist in the Rio de Janeiro Grand Prix event in 1990. Wostenholme was the first Canadian to win a match at each of the four Grand Slam events, reaching the second rounds of the 1985 US Open, the 1986 French Open and Wimbledon Championships, and the 1990 Australian Open.

In Davis Cup, Wostenholme had a career singles win-lose record of 12 and 8. He was a member of Canada's first ever squad to play the World Group, in 1991/92.

Wostenholme was born in Toronto, Canada and resided in nearby Oakville. He was inducted into the Canadian Tennis Hall of Fame in 2003.
