= Peru Davis Cup team =

National sports team

Peru
- Captain: Luis Horna
- Nations Ranking: 27 ▲1 (21 September 2026)
- Colors: red and white
- First year: 1933
- Years played: 52
- Ties played (W–L): 103 (49–54)
- Years in World Group: 3 (0–1)
- Best finish: WG 1R (2008)
- Most total wins: Jaime Yzaga (41–27)
- Most singles wins: Jaime Yzaga (28−17); Luis Horna (28−7)
- Most doubles wins: Jaime Yzaga (13−10)
- Best doubles team: Jaime Yzaga/Carlos di Laura (7-5)
- Most ties played: Iván Miranda (31)
- Most years played: Luis Horna (15)

The Peru national tennis team is the Davis Cup team that represents the nation of Peru. The team is governed by the Federación Deportiva Peruana de Tenis. They currently compete in the World Group I, and their best result was reaching the World Group in 2008.

== History ==
Peru’s participation in the Davis Cup started in 1933; however, its appearances in the following years were all walkover losses. Eventually, in 1958 Peruvian-born Alex Olmedo won the Davis Cup while playing for the United States team, but the first official participation by a Peruvian team will not occurred until 1968 (a 3–0 loss to Chile).

Peru's first victory would come in 1976, when the team defeats Uruguay at Montevideo, by a margin of 2–3. Players Miguel Maurtúa and Fernando Maynetto were an important part of this team. Peru's next rival was Brazil, and the result was a 5–0 loss for the Peruvians.

The first great participation of Peru's Davis Cup history came up in 1989, by defeating Ecuador 5-0 and Brazil 3–2. Thus, the team made it into the World Group playoffs. Peru's rival was the Australia of Cahill and Masur. The game disputed in Lima resulted in a 3–2 win for Australia. Peruvian tennis players Jaime Yzaga, Pablo Arraya, and Carlos di Laura were already beginning to show their skill.

The early 90s proved disastrous for Peru, who got relegated to Group II of the Americas zone. Upon returning to Group I in 1994, the Yzaga-led team was able to beat Mexico, Chile, and Brazil by 3-2 margins each time, qualifying for the World Group playoffs again. This time the team lost to Denmark 4–1.

The team was relegated to the Americas Zone Group 2 for the 1997 season, but returned to Group 1 in 2000. The following year they were relegated again but also returned in 2003. The team defeated Mexico and Venezuela to qualify for the World Group playoffs again in 2007, where they defeated Belarus 4-1 and secured promotion to the World Group for the first time.

In 2008 Davis Cup World Group, Peru played this stage of premium tennis for the first and only time in its history. Unfortunately, the national team of Spain was the rival of Peru. Although having Rafael Nadal and David Ferrer, Spain played with a "B" team. But nevertheless, the Spain team played like they were locals and the Peruvian team, formed by Iván Miranda, Mauricio Echazu, Luis Horna and Matías Silva, lost by 0-5 and the dream of playing in the World Group ended there.

== Courts ==
- Club Lawn Tennis de la Exposición: Located in the district of Jesús María in Lima, it is the usual court where Peru plays. The court was found in 1884, and was the home scenario for the golden generation of Peruvian tennis players of the 1980s. Its principal colosseum is that of the Buse Brothers.
- Court del Boulevard Sur Plaza de Asia: Located in the province of Cañete, this scenario got converted into the principal court for Peru at the starts of this century. A special colosseum was built for the games to be played. This court is located in one of the most important commercial zones of the Lima Region.
- Rinconada Country Club: Located in the district La Molina of in Lima, it can seat 4,000 spectators.
- Club Internacional Arequipa: Located in Arequipa, city in south of the Peruvian Andes, and to 2.335 m. Also is second largest city in Peru. Its principal colosseum is that of Alejandro Olmedo, a former tennis player winner of two Grand Slam (Australian Open and Wimbledon) in 1959.

== Results and fixtures ==
The following is a list of match results and scheduled matches for the current year.

Win Loss Fixture

=== 2026 ===
Qualifiers
First round

Germany
4
Castello, Düsseldorf, Germany
6–7 February 2026
Hard (indoors)

Peru
0

			1	2	3
1	(Germany) (Peru)	Yannick Hanfmann; Gonzalo Bueno	6; 4	6; 4
2	(Germany) (Peru)	Jan-Lennard Struff; Juan Pablo Varillas	6; 4	6; 2
3	(Germany) (Peru)	Kevin Krawietz / Tim Pütz; Ignacio Buse / Arklon Huertas del Pino	6; 0	2; 6	6; 4
4	(Germany) (Peru)	Justin Engel; Gonzalo Bueno	6; 3	6^{4} 7^{7}	10; 6
5	(Germany) (Peru)	Yannick Hanfmann; Juan Pablo Varillas				not played

World Group I

Peru
3
Jockey Club del Perú
Lima, Peru
18–19 September 2026
Clay

Paraguay
2

			1	2	3
1	(Peru) (Paraguay)	Ignacio Buse; Hernando Jose Escurra Isnardi	7^{7} 6^{4}	4; 6	7; 5
2	(Peru) (Paraguay)	Juan Pablo Varillas; Adolfo Daniel Vallejo	5; 7	7^{8} 6^{6}	6; 3
3	(Peru) (Paraguay)	Ignacio Buse / Arklon Huertas del Pino; Adolfo Daniel Vallejo / Martin Antonio Vergara del Puerto	3; 6	5; 7
4	(Peru) (Paraguay)	Ignacio Buse; Adolfo Daniel Vallejo	7; 5	5; 7	6^{3} 7^{7}
5	(Peru) (Paraguay)	Juan Pablo Varillas; Hernando Jose Escurra Isnardi	6; 2	6; 4

== Players ==
=== Current squad ===
Players representing Peru at the 2026 Davis Cup World Group I
Player	Age	ATP ranking		Debut	Nom	Ties	Win-loss			Davis Cup Profile
Player	Age	Singles	Doubles	Debut	Nom	Ties	Singles	Doubles	Total	Davis Cup Profile
Ignacio Buse	22	35	422	2023	8	8	6–3	2–3	8–6	
Gonzalo Bueno	22	172	1491	2023	10	6	3–4	–	3–4	
Juan Pablo Varillas	31	190	–	2015	20	19	15–12	3–5	18–17	
Arklon Huertas del Pino	32	674	234	2021	10	8	1–0	2–5	3–5	
Alexander Merino	34	–	221	2017	4	1	0–1	–	0–1	
Non-playing captain: Luis Horna

== Former players ==
- Luis Horna
- Jaime Yzaga
- Iván Miranda
- Américo Venero
- Carlos di Laura
- Alejandro Aramburú
- Pablo Arraya
- Nicolás Álvarez
- Alejandro Olmedo

== See also ==
- List of Peru Davis Cup team representatives
- Davis Cup
- Peru Billie Jean King Cup team
