= 1999 Davis Cup Americas Zone Group IV =

International tennis competition

The Americas Zone was one of the three zones of the regional Davis Cup competition in 1999.

In the Americas Zone there were four different tiers, called groups, in which teams competed against each other to advance to the upper tier. The top two teams in Group IV advanced to the Americas Zone Group III in 2000. All other teams remained in Group IV.

== Participating nations ==
- Barbados
- Bermuda
- Eastern Caribbean
- Saint Lucia
- Puerto Rico
- Trinidad and Tobago
- U.S. Virgin Islands

=== Draw ===
- Venue: Hasely Crawford Stadium, Port of Spain, Trinidad and Tobago
- Date: 8–14 March

	PUR	TRI	ISV	LCA	BER	BAR	ECA	RR; W–L	Match; W–L	Set; W–L	Standings
Puerto Rico		3–0	2–1	3–0	2–1	3–0	3–0	6–0	16–2 (89%)	32–7 (82%)	1
Trinidad and Tobago	0–3		2–1	3–0	2–1	2–1	3–0	5–1	12–6 (67%)	25–17 (60%)	2
U.S. Virgin Islands	1–2	1–2		2–1	2–1	3–0	2–1	4–2	11–7 (61%)	26–16 (62%)	3
Saint Lucia	0–3	0–3	1–2		3–0	2–1	3–0	3–3	9–9 (50%)	21–20 (51%)	4
Bermuda	1–2	1–2	1–2	0–3		3–0	2–1	2–4	8–10 (44%)	20–23 (47%)	5
Barbados	0–3	1–2	0–3	1–2	0–3		3–0	1–5	5–13 (28%)	12–28 (30%)	6
Eastern Caribbean	0–3	0–3	1–2	0–3	1–2	0–3		0–6	2–16 (11%)	9–34 (21%)	7

- Puerto Rico and Trinidad and Tobago promoted to Group III in 2000.

== Results ==
=== Trinidad and Tobago vs. Saint Lucia ===
Trinidad and Tobago
3
Hasely Crawford Stadium, Port of Spain, Trinidad and Tobago
8 March 1999

Saint Lucia
0

			1	2	3
1	(Trinidad and Tobago) (Saint Lucia)	Ronald Greaves; Vernon Lewis	6; 2	6; 4
2	(Trinidad and Tobago) (Saint Lucia)	Simon Evelyn; Kane Easter	7^{7} 6^{4}	6^{1} 7^{7}	9; 7
3	(Trinidad and Tobago) (Saint Lucia)	Randy Hakim / Nicolas Rose; Yves Sinson / Stephen Charlery	6; 3	6; 3

=== Barbados vs. Bermuda ===
Barbados
0
Hasely Crawford Stadium, Port of Spain, Trinidad and Tobago
8 March 1999

Bermuda
3

			1	2	3
1	(Barbados) (Bermuda)	Kodi Lewis; Richard Mallory	6^{3} 7^{7}	1; 6
2	(Barbados) (Bermuda)	Bernard Frost; Michael Way	4; 6	6; 4	3; 6
3	(Barbados) (Bermuda)	James Betts / Michael Date; Jenson Bascome / Dean Mello	6^{4} 7^{7}	4; 6

=== Eastern Caribbean vs. Puerto Rico ===
Eastern Caribbean
0
Hasely Crawford Stadium, Port of Spain, Trinidad and Tobago
8 March 1999

Puerto Rico
3

			1	2	3
1	(Eastern Caribbean) (Puerto Rico)	Kirt Cable; Luis Haddock	4; 6	3; 6
2	(Eastern Caribbean) (Puerto Rico)	Jimmy Browne; Gabriel Montilla	4; 6	2; 6
3	(Eastern Caribbean) (Puerto Rico)	Kirt Cable / Hayden Ashton; Ricardo Jordan / Edgardo Rivera	2; 6	2; 6

=== Trinidad and Tobago vs. U.S. Virgin Islands ===
Trinidad and Tobago
2
Hasely Crawford Stadium, Port of Spain, Trinidad and Tobago
9 March 1999

U.S. Virgin Islands
1

			1	2	3
1	(Trinidad and Tobago) (United States Virgin Islands)	Ronald Greaves; Wilbur Callender	5; 7	3; 6
2	(Trinidad and Tobago) (United States Virgin Islands)	Simon Evelyn; Terrance Eugene Highfield	2; 6	6; 0	6; 1
3	(Trinidad and Tobago) (United States Virgin Islands)	Simon Evelyn / Randy Hakim; Wilbur Callender / Gregory Newton	7; 5	6; 2

=== Bermuda vs. Eastern Caribbean ===
Bermuda
2
Hasely Crawford Stadium, Port of Spain, Trinidad and Tobago
9 March 1999

Eastern Caribbean
1

			1	2	3
1	(Bermuda) (Eastern Caribbean)	Richard Mallory; Kirt Cable	6; 1	3; 6	6; 3
2	(Bermuda) (Eastern Caribbean)	Michael Way; Jimmy Browne	6; 0	6; 2
3	(Bermuda) (Eastern Caribbean)	Jenson Bascome / Dean Mello; Hayden Ashton / Kirt Cable	4; 6	6; 3	2; 6

=== Saint Lucia vs. Puerto Rico ===
Saint Lucia
0
Hasely Crawford Stadium, Port of Spain, Trinidad and Tobago
9 March 1999

Puerto Rico
3

			1	2	3
1	(Saint Lucia) (Puerto Rico)	Vernon Lewis; Edgardo Rivera	4; 6	6; 3	4; 6
2	(Saint Lucia) (Puerto Rico)	Kane Easter; Gabriel Montilla	5; 7	6^{3} 7^{7}
3	(Saint Lucia) (Puerto Rico)	Kane Easter / Yves Sinson; Luis Haddock / Ricardo Jordan	4; 6	2; 6

=== Trinidad and Tobago vs. Puerto Rico ===
Trinidad and Tobago
0
Hasely Crawford Stadium, Port of Spain, Trinidad and Tobago
10 March 1999

Puerto Rico
3

			1	2	3
1	(Trinidad and Tobago) (Puerto Rico)	Ronald Greaves; Luis Haddock	6; 3	4; 6	1; 6
2	(Trinidad and Tobago) (Puerto Rico)	Simon Evelyn; Gabriel Montilla	1; 6	0; 6
3	(Trinidad and Tobago) (Puerto Rico)	Randy Hakim / Nicolas Rose; Ricardo Jordan / Gabriel Montilla	5; 7	1; 6

=== Barbados vs. Eastern Caribbean ===
Barbados
3
Hasely Crawford Stadium, Port of Spain, Trinidad and Tobago
10 March 1999

Eastern Caribbean
0

			1	2	3
1	(Barbados) (Eastern Caribbean)	Kodi Lewis; Kirt Cable	7; 5	3; 6	6; 4
2	(Barbados) (Eastern Caribbean)	Bernard Frost; Jimmy Browne	6; 2	6; 1
3	(Barbados) (Eastern Caribbean)	James Betts / Bernard Frost; Hayden Ashton / Kirt Cable	6; 3	6; 4

=== U.S. Virgin Islands vs. Saint Lucia ===
U.S. Virgin Islands
2
Hasely Crawford Stadium, Port of Spain, Trinidad and Tobago
10 March 1999

Saint Lucia
1

			1	2	3
1	(United States Virgin Islands) (Saint Lucia)	Wilbur Callender; Vernon Lewis	2; 6	5; 7
2	(United States Virgin Islands) (Saint Lucia)	Terrance Eugene Highfield; Kane Easter	6; 3	6; 2
3	(United States Virgin Islands) (Saint Lucia)	Terrance Eugene Highfield / Gregory Newton; Kane Easter / Vernon Lewis	7^{7} 6^{2}	7^{7} 6^{3}

=== Trinidad and Tobago vs. Bermuda ===
Trinidad and Tobago
2
Hasely Crawford Stadium, Port of Spain, Trinidad and Tobago
11 March 1999

Bermuda
1

			1	2	3
1	(Trinidad and Tobago) (Bermuda)	Ronald Greaves; Richard Mallory	3; 6	3; 6
2	(Trinidad and Tobago) (Bermuda)	Simon Evelyn; Michael Way	6; 4	6; 4
3	(Trinidad and Tobago) (Bermuda)	Simon Evelyn / Nicolas Rose; Dean Mello / Michael Way	5; 7	6; 4	6; 3

=== Barbados vs. Saint Lucia ===
Barbados
1
Hasely Crawford Stadium, Port of Spain, Trinidad and Tobago
11 March 1999

Saint Lucia
2

			1	2	3
1	(Barbados) (Saint Lucia)	James Betts; Vernon Lewis	3; 6	0; 6
2	(Barbados) (Saint Lucia)	Kodi Lewis; Kane Easter	2; 6	4; 6
3	(Barbados) (Saint Lucia)	James Betts / Bernard Frost; Yves Sinson / Stephen Charlery	6; 4	6^{4} 7^{7}	6; 3

=== U.S. Virgin Islands vs. Puerto Rico ===
U.S. Virgin Islands
1
Hasely Crawford Stadium, Port of Spain, Trinidad and Tobago
11 March 1999

Puerto Rico
2

			1	2	3
1	(United States Virgin Islands) (Puerto Rico)	Gregory Newton; Luis Haddock	6; 3	6; 4
2	(United States Virgin Islands) (Puerto Rico)	Terrance Eugene Highfield; Gabriel Montilla	1; 6	5; 7
3	(United States Virgin Islands) (Puerto Rico)	Terrance Eugene Highfield / Gregory Newton; Ricardo Jordan / Gabriel Montilla	4; 6	7; 5	2; 6

=== Trinidad and Tobago vs. Barbados ===
Trinidad and Tobago
2
Hasely Crawford Stadium, Port of Spain, Trinidad and Tobago
12 March 1999

Barbados
1

			1	2	3
1	(Trinidad and Tobago) (Barbados)	Ronald Greaves; James Betts	4; 6	6^{3} 7^{7}
2	(Trinidad and Tobago) (Barbados)	Simon Evelyn; Kodi Lewis	1; 6	6; 1	6; 4
3	(Trinidad and Tobago) (Barbados)	Simon Evelyn / Randy Hakim; James Betts / Bernard Frost	6; 1	6; 2

=== Bermuda vs. Saint Lucia ===
Bermuda
0
Hasely Crawford Stadium, Port of Spain, Trinidad and Tobago
12 March 1999

Saint Lucia
3

			1	2	3
1	(Bermuda) (Saint Lucia)	Jenson Bascome; Vernon Lewis	1; 6	1; 6
2	(Bermuda) (Saint Lucia)	Richard Mallory; Kane Easter	6; 4	1; 6	2; 6
3	(Bermuda) (Saint Lucia)	Jenson Bascome / Dean Mello; Vernon Lewis / Yves Sinson	1; 6	3; 6

=== Eastern Caribbean vs. U.S. Virgin Islands ===
Eastern Caribbean
1
Hasely Crawford Stadium, Port of Spain, Trinidad and Tobago
12 March 1999

U.S. Virgin Islands
2

			1	2	3
1	(Eastern Caribbean) (United States Virgin Islands)	Kirt Cable; Louis Taylor III	6; 2	2; 6	6; 1
2	(Eastern Caribbean) (United States Virgin Islands)	Jimmy Browne; Wilbur Callender	4; 6	2; 6
3	(Eastern Caribbean) (United States Virgin Islands)	Hayden Ashton / Kirt Cable; Wilbur Callender / Gregory Newton	4; 6	7; 5	4; 6

=== Trinidad and Tobago vs. Eastern Caribbean ===
Trinidad and Tobago
3
Hasely Crawford Stadium, Port of Spain, Trinidad and Tobago
13 March 1999

Eastern Caribbean
0

			1	2	3
1	(Trinidad and Tobago) (Eastern Caribbean)	Nicolas Rose; Kirt Cable	6^{4} 7^{7}	6; 3	6; 1
2	(Trinidad and Tobago) (Eastern Caribbean)	Randy Hakim; Jimmy Browne	6; 1	6; 1
3	(Trinidad and Tobago) (Eastern Caribbean)	Simon Evelyn / Ronald Greaves; Jimmy Browne / Trevor Sam	6; 1	6; 3

=== Barbados vs. U.S. Virgin Islands ===
Barbados
0
Hasely Crawford Stadium, Port of Spain, Trinidad and Tobago
13 March 1999

U.S. Virgin Islands
3

			1	2	3
1	(Barbados) (United States Virgin Islands)	James Betts; Gregory Newton	3; 6	3; 6
2	(Barbados) (United States Virgin Islands)	Kodi Lewis; Wilbur Callender	5; 7	4; 6
3	(Barbados) (United States Virgin Islands)	Michael Date / Bernard Frost; Gregory Newton / Louis Taylor III	5; 7	2; 6

=== Bermuda vs. Puerto Rico ===
Bermuda
1
Hasely Crawford Stadium, Port of Spain, Trinidad and Tobago
13 March 1999

Puerto Rico
2

			1	2	3
1	(Bermuda) (Puerto Rico)	Richard Mallory; Edgardo Rivera	6; 3	7^{7} 6^{2}
2	(Bermuda) (Puerto Rico)	Michael Way; Gabriel Montilla	4; 6	1; 6
3	(Bermuda) (Puerto Rico)	Jenson Bascome / Richard Mallory; Ricardo Jordan / Gabriel Montilla	0; 6	4; 6

=== Barbados vs. Puerto Rico ===
Barbados
0
Hasely Crawford Stadium, Port of Spain, Trinidad and Tobago
14 March 1999

Puerto Rico
3

			1	2	3
1	(Barbados) (Puerto Rico)	James Betts; Luis Haddock	4; 6	5; 7
2	(Barbados) (Puerto Rico)	Kodi Lewis; Gabriel Montilla	4; 6	4; 6
3	(Barbados) (Puerto Rico)	James Betts / Kodi Lewis; Ricardo Jordan / Edgardo Rivera	2; 6	4; 6

=== Bermuda vs. U.S. Virgin Islands ===
Bermuda
1
Hasely Crawford Stadium, Port of Spain, Trinidad and Tobago
14 March 1999

U.S. Virgin Islands
2

			1	2	3
1	(Bermuda) (United States Virgin Islands)	Dean Mello; Gregory Newton	2; 6	4; 6
2	(Bermuda) (United States Virgin Islands)	Michael Way; Terrance Eugene Highfield	6; 3	3; 6	1; 6
3	(Bermuda) (United States Virgin Islands)	Jenson Bascome / Dean Mello; Gregory Newton / Louis Taylor III	7; 5	6^{3} 7^{7}	6; 1

=== Eastern Caribbean vs. Saint Lucia ===
Eastern Caribbean
0
Hasely Crawford Stadium, Port of Spain, Trinidad and Tobago
14 March 1999

Saint Lucia
3

			1	2	3
1	(Eastern Caribbean) (Saint Lucia)	Kirt Cable; Vernon Lewis	6; 4	5; 7	2; 6
2	(Eastern Caribbean) (Saint Lucia)	Jimmy Browne; Kane Easter	1; 6	0; 6
3	(Eastern Caribbean) (Saint Lucia)	Hayden Ashton / Kirt Cable; Kane Easter / Vernon Lewis	3; 6	4; 6
