= Australia Davis Cup team results (1950–1979) =

This is a list of the Australia Davis Cup team results from 1950 to 1979. It does not include ties that were not completed, for example when a walkover occurred. In total they played 69 ties.

The team was very successful in this period, competing in 19 consecutive Challenge Rounds from 1950 to 1968, winning 15 titles. After the abolishment of the Challenge Round for the 1972 edition, Australia won two more Davis Cup titles in 1973 and 1977 and semi-finalists on five occasions 1972, 1975, 1976, 1978 and 1979

== 1950s ==
=== 1950 ===
America Zone
Semifinals

Canada
0
Mount Royal Tennis Club, Montreal, Canada
14–16 July 1950
Grass

Australia
5

			1	2	3	4	5
1	(Canada) (Australia)	Brendan Macken; Frank Sedgman	5; 7	2; 6	1; 6
2	(Canada) (Australia)	Lorne Main; Ken McGregor	1; 6	2; 6	5; 7
3	(Canada) (Australia)	George Robinson / Henri Rochon; John Bromwich / Frank Sedgman	2; 6	4; 6	4; 6
4	(Canada) (Australia)	Lorne Main; Frank Sedgman	1; 6	2; 6	3; 6
5	(Canada) (Australia)	Brendan Macken; Ken McGregor	4; 6	4; 6	4; 6

America Zone
Final

Mexico
1
Centro Deportivo Chapultepec, Mexico City, Mexico
28–30 July 1950
Clay

Australia
4

			1	2	3	4	5
1	(Mexico) (Australia)	Armando Vega; Frank Sedgman	6; 2	4; 6	2; 6	6; 4	2; 6
2	(Mexico) (Australia)	Gustavo Palafox; Ken McGregor	6; 4	6; 4	6; 8	3; 6	6; 3
3	(Mexico) (Australia)	Gustavo Palafox / Armando Vega; John Bromwich / Frank Sedgman	4; 6	5; 7	2; 6
4	(Mexico) (Australia)	Gustavo Palafox; Frank Sedgman	4; 6	4; 6	2; 6
5	(Mexico) (Australia)	Armando Vega; John Bromwich	6; 3	0; 6	2; 6	2; 6

Inter-Zonal
Final

Australia
3
Westchester Country Club, Rye, NY, United States
11–13 August 1950
Grass

Sweden
2

			1	2	3	4	5
1	(Australia) (Sweden)	Frank Sedgman; Lennart Bergelin	6; 2	2; 6	5; 7	6; 1	3; 6
2	(Australia) (Sweden)	John Bromwich; Torsten Johansson	6; 2	6; 3	6; 0
3	(Australia) (Sweden)	John Bromwich / Frank Sedgman; Lennart Bergelin / Sven Davidson	6; 1	7; 5	7; 5
4	(Australia) (Sweden)	John Bromwich; Lennart Bergelin	3; 6	2; 6	6; 1	9; 7	3; 6
5	(Australia) (Sweden)	Frank Sedgman; Torsten Johansson	6; 4	7; 5	6; 3

Challenge
Round

United States
1
West Side Tennis Club, Forest Hills, NY, United States
25–27 August 1950
Grass

Australia
4

			1	2	3	4	5
1	(United States) (Australia)	Tom Brown; Frank Sedgman	0; 6	6; 8	7; 9
2	(United States) (Australia)	Ted Schroeder; Ken McGregor	11; 13	3; 6	4; 6
3	(United States) (Australia)	Gardnar Mulloy / Ted Schroeder; John Bromwich / Frank Sedgman	6; 4	4; 6	2; 6	6; 4	4; 6
4	(United States) (Australia)	Ted Schroeder; Frank Sedgman	2; 6	2; 6	2; 6
5	(United States) (Australia)	Tom Brown; Ken McGregor	9; 11	8; 10	11; 9	6; 1	6; 4

=== 1951 ===
Challenge
Round

Australia
3
White City Stadium, Sydney, Australia
26–28 December 1951
Grass

United States
2

			1	2	3	4	5
1	(Australia) (United States)	Mervyn Rose; Vic Seixas	3; 6	4; 6	7; 9
2	(Australia) (United States)	Frank Sedgman; Ted Schroeder	6; 4	6; 3	4; 6	6; 4
3	(Australia) (United States)	Ken McGregor / Frank Sedgman; Ted Schroeder / Tony Trabert	6; 2	9; 7	6; 3
4	(Australia) (United States)	Mervyn Rose; Ted Schroeder	4; 6	11; 13	5; 7
5	(Australia) (United States)	Frank Sedgman; Vic Seixas	6; 4	6; 2	6; 2

=== 1952 ===
Challenge
Round

Australia
4
Memorial Drive Park, Adelaide, Australia
29–31 December 1952
Grass

United States
1

			1	2	3	4	5
1	(Australia) (United States)	Frank Sedgman; Vic Seixas	6; 3	6; 4	6; 3
2	(Australia) (United States)	Ken McGregor; Tony Trabert	11; 9	6; 4	6; 1
3	(Australia) (United States)	Ken McGregor / Frank Sedgman; Vic Seixas / Tony Trabert	6; 3	6; 4	1; 6	6; 3
4	(Australia) (United States)	Frank Sedgman; Tony Trabert	7; 5	6; 4	10; 8
5	(Australia) (United States)	Ken McGregor; Vic Seixas	3; 6	6; 8	8; 6	3; 6

=== 1953 ===
Challenge
Round

Australia
3
Kooyong Stadium, Melbourne, Australia
28–31 December 1953
Grass

United States
2

			1	2	3	4	5
1	(Australia) (United States)	Lew Hoad; Vic Seixas	6; 4	6; 2	6; 3
2	(Australia) (United States)	Ken Rosewall; Tony Trabert	3; 6	4; 6	4; 6
3	(Australia) (United States)	Rex Hartwig / Lew Hoad; Vic Seixas / Tony Trabert	2; 6	4; 6	4; 6
4	(Australia) (United States)	Lew Hoad; Tony Trabert	13; 11	6; 3	2; 6	3; 6	7; 5
5	(Australia) (United States)	Ken Rosewall; Vic Seixas	6; 2	2; 6	6; 3	6; 4

=== 1954 ===
Challenge
Round

Australia
2
White City Stadium, Sydney, Australia
27–29 December 1954
Grass

United States
3

			1	2	3	4	5
1	(Australia) (United States)	Lew Hoad; Tony Trabert	4; 6	6; 2	10; 12	3; 6
2	(Australia) (United States)	Ken Rosewall; Vic Seixas	6; 8	8; 6	4; 6	3; 6
3	(Australia) (United States)	Lew Hoad / Ken Rosewall; Vic Seixas / Tony Trabert	2; 6	6; 4	2; 6	8; 10
4	(Australia) (United States)	Ken Rosewall; Tony Trabert	9; 7	7; 5	6; 3
5	(Australia) (United States)	Rex Hartwig; Vic Seixas	4; 6	6; 3	6; 2	6; 3

=== 1955 ===
America Zone
Quarterfinals

Australia
5
Saddle and Cycle Club, Chicago, IL, United States
15–17 July 1955
Clay

Mexico
0

			1	2	3	4	5
1	(Australia) (Mexico)	Ken Rosewall; Gustavo Palafox	6; 3	7; 5	6; 2
2	(Australia) (Mexico)	Rex Hartwig; Esteban Reyes Jr.	6; 0	3; 6	6; 3	6; 1
3	(Australia) (Mexico)	Rex Hartwig / Lew Hoad; Francisco Guerrero Arcocha / Gustavo Palafox	6; 1	6; 2	6; 4
4	(Australia) (Mexico)	Ken Rosewall; Esteban Reyes Jr.	6; 2	6; 4	6; 3
5	(Australia) (Mexico)	Rex Hartwig; Gustavo Palafox	6; 3	6; 3	6; 3

America Zone
Semifinals

Australia
4
Louisville Boat Club, Louisville, KY, United States
22–24 July 1955
Grass

Brazil
1

			1	2	3	4	5
1	(Australia) (Brazil)	Ken Rosewall; José Agüero	7; 5	6; 0	4; 6	6; 3
2	(Australia) (Brazil)	Lew Hoad; Bob Falkenburg	3; 6	8; 6	7; 5	6; 1
3	(Australia) (Brazil)	Rex Hartwig / Lew Hoad; Bob Falkenburg / Ronald Moreira	6; 2	6; 4	6; 1
4	(Australia) (Brazil)	Lew Hoad; Ronald Moreira	4; 6	4; 6	4; 6
5	(Australia) (Brazil)	Ken Rosewall; Bob Falkenburg	6; 2	6; 2	6; 3

America Zone
Final

Canada
0
Mount Royal Tennis Club, Montreal, Canada
29–31 July 1955
Grass

Australia
5

			1	2	3	4	5
1	(Canada) (Australia)	Robert Bedard; Ken Rosewall	0; 6	1; 6	6; 4	2; 6
2	(Canada) (Australia)	Lorne Main; Rex Hartwig	3; 6	3; 6	3; 6
3	(Canada) (Australia)	Robert Bedard / Don Fontana; Rex Hartwig / Lew Hoad	3; 6	6; 3	3; 6	4; 6
4	(Canada) (Australia)	Don Fontana; Lew Hoad	7; 9	5; 7	1; 6
5	(Canada) (Australia)	Henri Rochon; Ken Rosewall	1; 6	2; 6	1; 6

Inter-Zonal
Semifinals

Australia
4
Glen Cove Tennis Club, Glen Cove, NY, United States
5–7 August 1955
Grass

Japan
0

			1	2	3	4	5
1	(Australia) (Japan)	Ken Rosewall; Atsushi Miyagi	6; 4	6; 4	6; 1
2	(Australia) (Japan)	Rex Hartwig; Kosei Kamo	8; 6	6; 8	6; 3	5; 7	6; 3
3	(Australia) (Japan)	Rex Hartwig / Lew Hoad; Kosei Kamo / Atsushi Miyagi	6; 3	6; 3	6; 3
4	(Australia) (Japan)	Rex Hartwig; Atsushi Miyagi	3; 6	6; 0	6; 3	9; 7
5	(Australia) (Japan)	Ken Rosewall; Kosei Kamo	3; 1					not completed

Inter-Zonal
Final

Australia
5
Germantown Cricket Club, Philadelphia, PA, United States
14–16 August 1955
Grass

Italy
0

			1	2	3	4	5
1	(Australia) (Italy)	Lew Hoad; Fausto Gardini	6; 3	6; 2	6; 0
2	(Australia) (Italy)	Ken Rosewall; Nicola Pietrangeli	8; 6	3; 6	6; 1	6; 4
3	(Australia) (Italy)	Rex Hartwig / Lew Hoad; Nicola Pietrangeli / Orlando Sirola	7; 5	13; 11	7; 5
4	(Australia) (Italy)	Ken Rosewall; Orlando Sirola	6; 4	4; 6	6; 1	6; 4
5	(Australia) (Italy)	Lew Hoad; Nicola Pietrangeli	9; 7	6; 2	6; 3

Challenge
Round

United States
0
West Side Tennis Club, Forest Hills, NY, United States
26–28 August 1955
Grass

Australia
5

			1	2	3	4	5
1	(United States) (Australia)	Vic Seixas; Ken Rosewall	3; 6	8; 10	6; 4	2; 6
2	(United States) (Australia)	Tony Trabert; Lew Hoad	6; 4	3; 6	3; 6	6; 8
3	(United States) (Australia)	Vic Seixas / Tony Trabert; Rex Hartwig / Lew Hoad	14; 12	4; 6	3; 6	6; 3	5; 7
4	(United States) (Australia)	Vic Seixas; Lew Hoad	9; 7	1; 6	4; 6	4; 6
5	(United States) (Australia)	Ham Richardson; Ken Rosewall	4; 6	6; 3	1; 6	4; 6

=== 1956 ===
Challenge
Round

Australia
5
Memorial Drive, Adelaide, Australia
26–28 December 1956
Grass

United States
0

			1	2	3	4	5
1	(Australia) (United States)	Lew Hoad; Herbie Flam	6; 2	6; 3	6; 3
2	(Australia) (United States)	Ken Rosewall; Vic Seixas	6; 1	6; 4	4; 6	6; 1
3	(Australia) (United States)	Lew Hoad / Ken Rosewall; Sam Giammalva / Vic Seixas	1; 6	6; 1	7; 5	6; 4
4	(Australia) (United States)	Ken Rosewall; Sam Giammalva	4; 6	6; 1	8; 6	7; 5
5	(Australia) (United States)	Lew Hoad; Vic Seixas	6; 2	7; 5	6; 3

=== 1957 ===
Challenge
Round

Australia
3
Kooyong Stadium, Melbourne, Australia
26–28 December 1957
Grass

United States
2

			1	2	3	4	5
1	(Australia) (United States)	Mal Anderson; Barry MacKay	6; 3	7; 5	3; 6	7; 9	6; 3
2	(Australia) (United States)	Ashley Cooper; Vic Seixas	3; 6	7; 5	6; 1	1; 6	6; 3
3	(Australia) (United States)	Mal Anderson / Mervyn Rose; Barry MacKay / Vic Seixas	6; 4	6; 4	8; 6
4	(Australia) (United States)	Mal Anderson; Vic Seixas	3; 6	6; 4	3; 6	6; 0	11; 13
5	(Australia) (United States)	Ashley Cooper; Barry MacKay	4; 6	6; 1	6; 4	4; 6	3; 6

=== 1958 ===
Challenge
Round

Australia
2
Milton Courts, Brisbane, Australia
29–31 December 1958
Grass

United States
3

			1	2	3	4	5
1	(Australia) (United States)	Mal Anderson; Alex Olmedo	6; 8	6; 2	7; 9	6; 8
2	(Australia) (United States)	Ashley Cooper; Barry MacKay	4; 6	6; 3	6; 2	6; 4
3	(Australia) (United States)	Mal Anderson / Neale Fraser; Alex Olmedo / Ham Richardson	12; 10	6; 3	14; 16	3; 6	5; 7
4	(Australia) (United States)	Ashley Cooper; Alex Olmedo	3; 6	6; 4	4; 6	6; 8
5	(Australia) (United States)	Mal Anderson; Barry MacKay	7; 5	13; 11	11; 9

=== 1959 ===
America Zone
NCA Semifinals

Mexico
1
Centro Deportivo Chapultepec, Mexico City, Mexico
18–20 July 1959
Clay

Australia
4

			1	2	3	4	5
1	(Mexico) (Australia)	Antonio Palafox; Neale Fraser	6; 8	0; 6	6; 2	6; 4	3; 6
2	(Mexico) (Australia)	Mario Llamas; Rod Laver	6; 4	6; 4	6; 3
3	(Mexico) (Australia)	Mario Llamas / Antonio Palafox; Roy Emerson / Neale Fraser	3; 6	2; 6	5; 7
4	(Mexico) (Australia)	Antonio Palafox; Rod Laver	3; 6	8; 6	6; 4	5; 7	3; 6
5	(Mexico) (Australia)	Mario Llamas; Roy Emerson	4; 6	2; 6	6; 4	6; 4	0; 6

America Zone
NCA Final

Canada
0
Mount Royal Tennis Club, Montreal, Canada
24–26 July 1959
Grass

Australia
5

			1	2	3	4	5
1	(Canada) (Australia)	Don Fontana; Roy Emerson	2; 6	2; 6	4; 6
2	(Canada) (Australia)	Robert Bédard; Rod Laver	6; 8	3; 6	4; 6
3	(Canada) (Australia)	Robert Bédard / Don Fontana; Roy Emerson / Neale Fraser	3; 6	3; 6	1; 6
4	(Canada) (Australia)	Robert Bédard; Roy Emerson	6; 4	4; 6	5; 7	4; 6
5	(Canada) (Australia)	François Godbout; Rod Laver	9; 7	4; 6	2; 6	1; 6

Americas Inter-
Zonal Final

Australia
5
Mount Royal Tennis Club, Montreal, Canada
31 July–2 August 1959
Grass

Cuba
0

			1	2	3	4	5
1	(Australia) (Cuba)	Roy Emerson; Reynaldo Garrido	6; 0	6; 4	6; 4
2	(Australia) (Cuba)	Neale Fraser; Orlando Garrido	6; 1	7; 5	6; 3
3	(Australia) (Cuba)	Roy Emerson / Rod Laver; Orlando Garrido / Reynaldo Garrido	6; 4	6; 4	6; 4
4	(Australia) (Cuba)	Bob Mark; Orlando Garrido	6; 4	6; 4	6; 2
5	(Australia) (Cuba)	Neale Fraser; Reynaldo Garrido	6; 3	6; 2	6; 4

Inter-Zonal
Semifinals

Australia
4
Germantown Cricket Club, Philadelphia, PA, United States
7–10 August 1959
Grass

Italy
1

			1	2	3	4	5
1	(Australia) (Italy)	Rod Laver; Nicola Pietrangeli	6; 4	2; 6	6; 3	6; 3
2	(Australia) (Italy)	Neale Fraser; Orlando Sirola	19; 17	1; 6	6; 3	6; 4
3	(Australia) (Italy)	Roy Emerson / Neale Fraser; Nicola Pietrangeli / Orlando Sirola	3; 6	11; 9	6; 3	9; 7
4	(Australia) (Italy)	Rod Laver; Orlando Sirola	4; 6	6; 4	6; 0	6; 3
5	(Australia) (Italy)	Roy Emerson; Nicola Pietrangeli	4; 6	0; 6	4; 6

Inter-Zonal
Final

Australia
4
Longwood Cricket Club, Boston, MA, United States
14–16 August 1959
Grass

India
1

			1	2	3	4	5
1	(Australia) (India)	Rod Laver; Ramanathan Krishnan	1; 6	4; 6	10; 8	4; 6
2	(Australia) (India)	Neale Fraser; Premjit Lall	10; 8	6; 4	6; 1
3	(Australia) (India)	Roy Emerson / Neale Fraser; Ramanathan Krishnan / Premjit Lall	6; 3	7; 5	6; 2
4	(Australia) (India)	Neale Fraser; Ramanathan Krishnan	6; 2	6; 3	6; 4
5	(Australia) (India)	Rod Laver; Premjit Lall	6; 2	10; 8	6; 4

Challenge
Round

United States
2
West Side Tennis Club, Forest Hills, NY, United States
28–31 August 1959
Grass

Australia
3

			1	2	3	4	5
1	(United States) (Australia)	Alex Olmedo; Neale Fraser	6; 8	8; 6	4; 6	6; 8
2	(United States) (Australia)	Barry MacKay; Rod Laver	7; 5	6; 4	6; 1
3	(United States) (Australia)	Butch Buchholz / Alex Olmedo; Roy Emerson / Neale Fraser	5; 7	5; 7	4; 6
4	(United States) (Australia)	Alex Olmedo; Rod Laver	9; 7	4; 6	10; 8	12; 10
5	(United States) (Australia)	Barry MacKay; Neale Fraser	6; 8	6; 3	2; 6	4; 6

== 1960s ==
=== 1960 ===
Challenge
Round

Australia
4
White City Stadium, Sydney, Australia
26–28 December 1960
Grass

Italy
1

			1	2	3	4	5
1	(Australia) (Italy)	Neale Fraser; Orlando Sirola	4; 6	6; 3	6; 3	6; 3
2	(Australia) (Italy)	Rod Laver; Nicola Pietrangeli	8; 6	6; 4	6; 3
3	(Australia) (Italy)	Roy Emerson / Neale Fraser; Nicola Pietrangeli / Orlando Sirola	10; 8	5; 7	6; 2	6; 4
4	(Australia) (Italy)	Rod Laver; Orlando Sirola	9; 7	6; 2	6; 3
5	(Australia) (Italy)	Neale Fraser; Nicola Pietrangeli	9; 11	3; 6	6; 1	2; 6

=== 1961 ===
Challenge
Round

Australia
5
Kooyong Stadium, Melbourne, Australia
26–28 December 1961
Grass

Italy
0

			1	2	3	4	5
1	(Australia) (Italy)	Roy Emerson; Nicola Pietrangeli	8; 6	6; 4	6; 0
2	(Australia) (Italy)	Rod Laver; Orlando Sirola	6; 1	6; 4	6; 3
3	(Australia) (Italy)	Roy Emerson / Neale Fraser; Nicola Pietrangeli / Orlando Sirola	6; 2	6; 3	6; 4
4	(Australia) (Italy)	Rod Laver; Nicola Pietrangeli	6; 3	3; 6	4; 6	6; 3	8; 6
5	(Australia) (Italy)	Roy Emerson; Orlando Sirola	6; 3	6; 3	4; 6	6; 2

=== 1962 ===
Challenge
Round

Australia
5
Milton Courts, Brisbane, Australia
26–28 December 1962
Grass

Mexico
0

			1	2	3	4	5
1	(Australia) (Mexico)	Rod Laver; Rafael Osuna	6; 2	6; 1	7; 5
2	(Australia) (Mexico)	Neale Fraser; Antonio Palafox	7; 9	6; 2	6; 4	11; 9
3	(Australia) (Mexico)	Roy Emerson / Rod Laver; Rafael Osuna / Antonio Palafox	7; 5	6; 2	6; 4
4	(Australia) (Mexico)	Neale Fraser; Rafael Osuna	3; 6	11; 9	6; 1	3; 6	6; 4
5	(Australia) (Mexico)	Rod Laver; Antonio Palafox	6; 1	4; 6	6; 4	8; 6

=== 1963 ===
Challenge
Round

Australia
2
Memorial Drive Park, Adelaide, Australia
26–28 December 1963
Grass

United States
3

			1	2	3	4	5
1	(Australia) (United States)	John Newcombe; Dennis Ralston	4; 6	1; 6	6; 3	6; 4	5; 7
2	(Australia) (United States)	Roy Emerson; Chuck McKinley	6; 3	3; 6	7; 5	7; 5
3	(Australia) (United States)	Roy Emerson / Neale Fraser; Chuck McKinley / Dennis Ralston	3; 6	6; 4	9; 11	9; 11
4	(Australia) (United States)	Roy Emerson; Dennis Ralston	6; 2	6; 3	3; 6	6; 2
5	(Australia) (United States)	John Newcombe; Chuck McKinley	12; 10	2; 6	7; 9	2; 6

=== 1964 ===
America Zone
Quarterfinals

Canada
0
Mount Royal Tennis Club, Montreal, Canada
17–19 July 1964
Clay

Australia
5

			1	2	3	4	5
1	(Canada) (Australia)	Keith Carpenter; Roy Emerson	2; 6	1; 6	2; 6
2	(Canada) (Australia)	François Godbout; John Newcombe	3; 6	3; 6	6; 4	5; 7
3	(Canada) (Australia)	Keith Carpenter / François Godbout; Roy Emerson / Tony Roche	2; 6	2; 6	2; 6
4	(Canada) (Australia)	François Godbout; Tony Roche	2; 6	1; 6	1; 6
5	(Canada) (Australia)	Reider Getz; John Newcombe	3; 6	0; 6	4; 6

America Zone
Semifinals

Mexico
1
Centro Deportivo Chapultepec, Mexico City, Mexico
1–3 August 1964
Clay

Australia
4

			1	2	3	4	5
1	(Mexico) (Australia)	Rafael Osuna; Fred Stolle	6; 2	7; 5	6; 4
2	(Mexico) (Australia)	Antonio Palafox; Roy Emerson	6; 8	3; 6	3; 6
3	(Mexico) (Australia)	Rafael Osuna / Antonio Palafox; Roy Emerson / Fred Stolle	16; 18	9; 7	9; 7	4; 6	8; 10
4	(Mexico) (Australia)	Antonio Palafox; Fred Stolle	3; 6	2; 6	4; 6
5	(Mexico) (Australia)	Rafael Osuna; Roy Emerson	3; 6	4; 6	9; 11

America Zone
Final

Australia
5
Nicollet Tennis Club, Minneapolis, MN, United States
14–16 August 1964
Hard

Chile
0

			1	2	3	4	5
1	(Australia) (Chile)	Fred Stolle; Patricio Cornejo	6; 1	6; 0	6; 0
2	(Australia) (Chile)	Roy Emerson; Patricio Rodríguez	6; 3	6; 2	8; 6
3	(Australia) (Chile)	Roy Emerson / Fred Stolle; Ernesto Aguirre / Patricio Rodríguez	6; 4	6; 4	6; 4
4	(Australia) (Chile)	John Newcombe; Ernesto Aguirre	6; 2	6; 2	6; 4
5	(Australia) (Chile)	Fred Stolle; Patricio Rodríguez	6; 0	6; 4	6; 4

Inter-Zonal
Final

Sweden
0
Båstad Tennis Stadium, Båstad, Sweden
29–31 August 1964
Clay

Australia
5

			1	2	3	4	5
1	(Sweden) (Australia)	Jan-Erik Lundqvist; Roy Emerson	6; 2	6; 4	3; 6	2; 6	5; 7
2	(Sweden) (Australia)	Ulf Schmidt; Fred Stolle	4; 6	3; 6	8; 10
3	(Sweden) (Australia)	Jan-Erik Lundqvist / Ulf Schmidt; Roy Emerson / Fred Stolle	2; 6	1; 6	0; 6
4	(Sweden) (Australia)	Ulf Schmidt; Roy Emerson	6; 3	4; 6	3; 6	2; 6
5	(Sweden) (Australia)	Jan-Erik Lundqvist; Fred Stolle	7; 5	4; 6	0; 6	3; 6

Challenge
Round

United States
2
Harold Clark Courts, Cleveland, OH, United States
25–28 September 1964
Clay

Australia
3

			1	2	3	4	5
1	(United States) (Australia)	Chuck McKinley; Fred Stolle	6; 1	9; 7	4; 6	6; 2
2	(United States) (Australia)	Dennis Ralston; Roy Emerson	3; 6	4; 6	2; 6
3	(United States) (Australia)	Chuck McKinley / Dennis Ralston; Roy Emerson / Fred Stolle	6; 4	4; 6	4; 6	6; 3	6; 4
4	(United States) (Australia)	Dennis Ralston; Fred Stolle	5; 7	3; 6	6; 3	11; 9	4; 6
5	(United States) (Australia)	Chuck McKinley; Roy Emerson	6; 3	2; 6	4; 6	4; 6

=== 1965 ===
Challenge
Round

Australia
4
White City Stadium, Sydney, Australia
27–29 December 1965
Grass

Spain
1

			1	2	3	4	5
1	(Australia) (Spain)	Fred Stolle; Manuel Santana	10; 12	3; 6	6; 1	6; 4	7; 5
2	(Australia) (Spain)	Roy Emerson; Juan Gisbert	6; 3	6; 2	6; 2
3	(Australia) (Spain)	John Newcombe / Tony Roche; José Luis Arilla / Manuel Santana	6; 3	4; 6	7; 5	6; 2
4	(Australia) (Spain)	Roy Emerson; Manuel Santana	6; 2	3; 6	4; 6	13; 15
5	(Australia) (Spain)	Fred Stolle; Juan Gisbert	6; 2	6; 4	8; 6

=== 1966 ===
Challenge
Round

Australia
4
Kooyong Stadium, Melbourne, Australia
26–28 December 1966
Grass

India
1

			1	2	3	4	5
1	(Australia) (India)	Fred Stolle; Ramanathan Krishnan	6; 3	6; 2	6; 4
2	(Australia) (India)	Roy Emerson; Jaidip Mukerjea	7; 5	6; 4	6; 2
3	(Australia) (India)	John Newcombe / Tony Roche; Ramanathan Krishnan / Jaidip Mukerjea	6; 4	5; 7	4; 6	4; 6
4	(Australia) (India)	Roy Emerson; Ramanathan Krishnan	6; 0	6; 2	10; 8
5	(Australia) (India)	Fred Stolle; Jaidip Mukerjea	7; 5	6; 8	6; 3	5; 7	6; 3

=== 1967 ===
Challenge
Round

Australia
4
Milton Courts, Brisbane, Australia
26–28 December 1967
Grass

Spain
1

			1	2	3	4	5
1	(Australia) (Spain)	Roy Emerson; Manuel Santana	6; 4	6; 1	6; 1
2	(Australia) (Spain)	John Newcombe; Manuel Orantes	6; 3	6; 3	6; 2
3	(Australia) (Spain)	John Newcombe / Tony Roche; Manuel Orantes / Manuel Santana	6; 4	6; 4	6; 4
4	(Australia) (Spain)	John Newcombe; Manuel Santana	5; 7	4; 6	2; 6
5	(Australia) (Spain)	Roy Emerson; Manuel Orantes	6; 1	6; 1	2; 6	6; 4

=== 1968 ===
Challenge
Round

Australia
1
Memorial Drive Park, Adelaide, Australia
26–28 December 1968
Grass

United States
4

			1	2	3	4	5
1	(Australia) (United States)	Bill Bowrey; Clark Graebner	10; 8	4; 6	6; 8	6; 3	1; 6
2	(Australia) (United States)	Ray Ruffels; Arthur Ashe	8; 6	5; 7	3; 6	3; 6
3	(Australia) (United States)	John Alexander / Ray Ruffels; Bob Lutz / Stan Smith	4; 6	4; 6	2; 6
4	(Australia) (United States)	Ray Ruffels; Clark Graebner	6; 3	6; 8	6; 2	3; 6	1; 6
5	(Australia) (United States)	Bill Bowrey; Arthur Ashe	2; 6	6; 3	11; 9	8; 6

=== 1969 ===
America Zone
NCA Final

Mexico
3
Centro Deportivo Chapultepec, Mexico City, Mexico
23–25 May 1969
Clay

Australia
2

			1	2	3	4	5
1	(Mexico) (Australia)	Rafael Osuna; Ray Ruffels	9; 7	3; 6	7; 5	6; 3
2	(Mexico) (Australia)	Joaquín Loyo Mayo; Bill Bowrey	6; 4	3; 6	2; 6	5; 7
3	(Mexico) (Australia)	Rafael Osuna / Vicente Zarazúa; John Alexander / Phil Dent	18; 16	12; 10	6; 4
4	(Mexico) (Australia)	Joaquín Loyo Mayo; Ray Ruffels	3; 6	6; 4	4; 6	8; 10
5	(Mexico) (Australia)	Rafael Osuna; Bill Bowrey	6; 2	3; 6	8; 6	6; 3

== 1970s ==
=== 1970 ===
Eastern Zone A Semifinals

Philippines
0
Manila, Philippines
3–5 April 1970

Australia
5

			1	2	3	4	5
1	(Philippines) (Australia)	Eduardo Cruz; Ray Ruffels	4; 6	2; 6	4; 6
2	(Philippines) (Australia)	Raymundo Deyro; Dick Crealy	2; 6	6; 4	2; 6	1; 6
3	(Philippines) (Australia)	Eduardo Cruz / Alexander Marcial; Dick Crealy / Allan Stone	3; 6	4; 6	4; 6
4	(Philippines) (Australia)	Raymundo Deyro; Ray Ruffels	1; 6	0; 6	2; 6
5	(Philippines) (Australia)	Eduardo Cruz; John Alexander	6; 8	3; 6	3; 6

Eastern Zone A Final

Japan
0
Tokyo, Japan
17–19 April 1970

Australia
5

			1	2	3	4	5
1	(Japan) (Australia)	Koji Watanabe; Allan Stone	6; 8	9; 7	4; 6	0; 6
2	(Japan) (Australia)	Isao Kobayashi; Dick Crealy	4; 6	2; 6	6; 2	4; 6
3	(Japan) (Australia)	Junzo Kawamori / Takeshi Koura; Ray Ruffels / Allan Stone	5; 7	7; 5	2; 6	4; 6
4	(Japan) (Australia)	Koji Watanabe; Dick Crealy	11; 9	2; 6	1; 6	6; 3	3; 6
5	(Japan) (Australia)	Isao Kobayashi; Ray Ruffels	2; 6	2; 6	0; 6

Eastern Inter-Zonal Final

India
3
Bangalore, India
3–5 May 1970

Australia
1

			1	2	3	4	5
1	(India) (Australia)	Jaidip Mukerjea; Dick Crealy	3; 6	6; 8	6; 4	6; 3	6; 2
2	(India) (Australia)	Premjit Lall; Ray Ruffels	6; 2	6; 8	6; 3	3; 6	14; 12
3	(India) (Australia)	Premjit Lall / Jaidip Mukerjea; John Alexander / Allan Stone	13; 15	4; 6	4; 6
4	(India) (Australia)	Premjit Lall; Dick Crealy	8; 6	6; 2	6; 2
5	(India) (Australia)	Jaidip Mukerjea; Ray Ruffels	6; 3	7; 5	4; 6	3; 6	6; 6	not completed

=== 1971 ===
Eastern Zone A Quarterfinals

Hong Kong
0
Hong Kong
27–29 March 1971

Australia
5

			1	2	3	4	5
1	(Hong Kong) (Australia)	Louis Hsu; Colin Dibley	1; 6	2; 6	2; 6
2	(Hong Kong) (Australia)	Kenneth Tsui; John Cooper	2; 6	4; 6	2; 6
3	(Hong Kong) (Australia)	Ling Fong / Kenneth Tsui; Colin Dibley / Bob Giltinan	2; 6	3; 6	4; 6
4	(Hong Kong) (Australia)	Louis Hsu; John Cooper	3; 6	1; 6	0; 6
5	(Hong Kong) (Australia)	Charles Chang; Colin Dibley	2; 6	2; 6	1; 6

Eastern Zone A Semifinals

Indonesia
2
Jakarta, Indonesia
3–5 April 1971

Australia
3

			1	2	3	4	5
1	(Indonesia) (Australia)	Atet Wijono; Ross Case	2; 6	6; 2	6; 4	3; 6	3; 6
2	(Indonesia) (Australia)	Gondo Widjojo; Bob Giltinan	6; 8	4; 6	6; 0	4; 6
3	(Indonesia) (Australia)	Budiman Aznar / Jacky Wulur; John Cooper / Colin Dibley	2; 6	0; 6	1; 6
4	(Indonesia) (Australia)	Atet Wijono; John Cooper	6; 4	6; 4	10; 8
5	(Indonesia) (Australia)	Gondo Widjojo; Colin Dibley	6; 1	4; 6	7; 5	6; 1

Eastern Zone A Final

Japan
3
Tokyo, Japan
23–25 April 1971

Australia
2

			1	2	3	4	5
1	(Japan) (Australia)	Keishiro Yanagi; John Cooper	6; 3	6; 4	2; 6	1; 6	6; 3
2	(Japan) (Australia)	Toshiro Sakai; Colin Dibley	5; 7	8; 6	6; 3	6; 2
3	(Japan) (Australia)	Junzo Kawamori / Takeshi Koura; Colin Dibley / Bob Giltinan	1; 6	6; 3	9; 11	1; 6
4	(Japan) (Australia)	Keishiro Yanagi; Colin Dibley	3; 6	4; 6	7; 5	6; 3	6; 8
5	(Japan) (Australia)	Toshiro Sakai; John Cooper	6; 1	15; 13	8; 6

=== 1972 ===
Eastern Zone A Semifinals

South Korea
0
Seoul, South Korea
14–16 April 1972

Australia
5

			1	2	3	4	5
1	(South Korea) (Australia)	Kim Sung-bae; Colin Dibley	1; 6	6; 4	4; 6	3; 6
2	(South Korea) (Australia)	Chung Yong-ho; Mal Anderson	6; 4	0; 6	2; 6	5; 7
3	(South Korea) (Australia)	Chung Yong-ho / Kim Moon-il; Mal Anderson / Geoff Masters	5; 7	2; 6	2; 6
4	(South Korea) (Australia)	Chung Yong-ho; Colin Dibley	5; 7	8; 10	1; 6
5	(South Korea) (Australia)	Kim Sung-bae; Mal Anderson	2; 6	2; 6	2; 6

Eastern Zone A Final

Japan
1
Tokyo, Japan
28–30 April 1972

Australia
4

			1	2	3	4	5
1	(Japan) (Australia)	Toshiro Sakai; Mal Anderson	3; 6	3; 6	3; 6
2	(Japan) (Australia)	Jun Kuki; Colin Dibley	4; 6	6; 3	6; 3	1; 6	3; 6
3	(Japan) (Australia)	Jun Kamiwazumi / Toshiro Sakai; Mal Anderson / Geoff Masters	6; 3	9; 7	1; 6	6; 3
4	(Japan) (Australia)	Jun Kuki; Mal Anderson	2; 6	3; 6	2; 6
5	(Japan) (Australia)	Toshiro Sakai; Colin Dibley	6; 4	4; 6	6; 4	5; 7	3; 6

Eastern Zone
Inter-Zonal
Final

India
0
Bangalore, India
16–18 May 1972

Australia
5

			1	2	3	4	5
1	(India) (Australia)	Vijay Amritraj; Mal Anderson	4; 6	4; 6	2; 6
2	(India) (Australia)	Jaidip Mukerjea; Geoff Masters	3; 6	3; 6	6; 3	6; 1	3; 6
3	(India) (Australia)	Premjit Lall / Jaidip Mukerjea; Colin Dibley / Geoff Masters	2; 6	4; 6	6; 3	3; 6
4	(India) (Australia)	Anand Amritraj; Ross Case	1; 6	6; 8	5; 7
5	(India) (Australia)	Vijay Amritraj; Colin Dibley	5; 7	6; 4	3; 6	2; 6

Semifinals

Romania
4
Bucharest, Romania
4–7 August 1972
Clay

Australia
1

			1	2	3	4	5
1	(Romania) (Australia)	Ion Țiriac; Mal Anderson	6; 2	6; 2	6; 8	4; 6	4; 6
2	(Romania) (Australia)	Ilie Năstase; Colin Dibley	6; 3	6; 0	6; 2
3	(Romania) (Australia)	Ilie Năstase / Ion Țiriac; Mal Anderson / Colin Dibley	6; 2	6; 2	6; 2
4	(Romania) (Australia)	Ion Țiriac; Colin Dibley	6; 3	3; 6	11; 13	6; 3	6; 0
5	(Romania) (Australia)	Ilie Năstase; Mal Anderson	6; 2	6; 2	4; 6	6; 3

=== 1973 ===
Eastern Zone
Semifinals

Japan
1
Tokyo, Japan
20–22 April 1973

Australia
4

			1	2	3	4	5
1	(Japan) (Australia)	Toshiro Sakai; Mal Anderson	2; 6	7; 9	6; 3	1; 6
2	(Japan) (Australia)	Jun Kamiwazumi; John Newcombe	2; 6	5; 7	1; 6
3	(Japan) (Australia)	Jun Kamiwazumi / Toshiro Sakai; Geoff Masters / John Newcombe	4; 6	5; 7	4; 6
4	(Japan) (Australia)	Toshiro Sakai; John Newcombe	8; 6	6; 4	4; 6	0; 6	6; 3
5	(Japan) (Australia)	Jun Kamiwazumi; Mal Anderson	6; 4	6; 4	4; 6	4; 6	6; 8

Eastern Zone
Final

India
0
Madras, India
4–6 May 1973

Australia
4

			1	2	3	4	5
1	(India) (Australia)	Anand Amritraj; John Newcombe	2; 6	1; 6	0; 6
2	(India) (Australia)	Vijay Amritraj; Mal Anderson	1; 6	2; 6	1; 6
3	(India) (Australia)	Vijay Amritraj / Premjit Lall; Geoff Masters / John Newcombe	6; 4	2; 6	5; 7	3; 6
4	(India) (Australia)	Premjit Lall; John Cooper	6; 4	0; 6	6; 8	1; 6
5	(India) (Australia)	Vijay Amritraj; John Newcombe	10; 12	6; 3				not completed

Semifinals

Australia
4
Kooyong Stadium, Melbourne, Australia
16–18 November 1973
Grass

Czechoslovakia
1

			1	2	3	4	5
1	(Australia) (Czechoslovakia)	Rod Laver; Jan Kodeš	6; 3	7; 5	7; 5
2	(Australia) (Czechoslovakia)	John Newcombe; Jiří Hřebec	4; 6	10; 8	4; 6	5; 7
3	(Australia) (Czechoslovakia)	Rod Laver / Ken Rosewall; Jan Kodeš / Vladimír Zedník	6; 4	14; 12	7; 9	8; 6
4	(Australia) (Czechoslovakia)	Rod Laver; Jiří Hřebec	5; 7	6; 3	6; 4	4; 6	6; 4
5	(Australia) (Czechoslovakia)	John Newcombe; Jan Kodeš	6; 2	6; 2	6; 4

Final

United States
0
Public Auditorium, Cleveland, Ohio, United States
30 November–2 December 1973
Carpet (indoors)

Australia
5

			1	2	3	4	5
1	(United States) (Australia)	Stan Smith; John Newcombe	1; 6	6; 3	3; 6	6; 3	4; 6
2	(United States) (Australia)	Tom Gorman; Rod Laver	10; 8	6; 8	8; 6	3; 6	1; 6
3	(United States) (Australia)	Stan Smith / Erik van Dillen; Rod Laver / John Newcombe	1; 6	2; 6	4; 6
4	(United States) (Australia)	Tom Gorman; John Newcombe	2; 6	1; 6	3; 6
5	(United States) (Australia)	Stan Smith; Rod Laver	3; 6	4; 6	6; 3	2; 6

=== 1974 ===
Eastern Zone
Semifinals

Pakistan
0
Rawalpindi, Pakistan
3–5 May 1974

Australia
3

			1	2	3	4	5
1	(Pakistan) (Australia)	Haroon Rahim; Tony Roche	7; 5	3; 6	1; 6	3; 6
2	(Pakistan) (Australia)	Saeed Meer; Syd Ball	4; 6	5; 7	14; 16
3	(Pakistan) (Australia)	Saeed Meer / Haroon Rahim; Colin Dibley / Tony Roche	18; 20	4; 6	3; 6
4	(Pakistan) (Australia)	Saeed Meer; Tony Roche						not played
5	(Pakistan) (Australia)	Haroon Rahim; Syd Ball						not played

Eastern Zone
Final

India
3
Calcutta, India
10–12 May 1974

Australia
2

			1	2	3	4	5
1	(India) (Australia)	Jasjit Singh; Bob Giltinan	11; 9	9; 11	12; 10	8; 6
2	(India) (Australia)	Vijay Amritraj; John Alexander	12; 14	15; 17	8; 6	2; 6
3	(India) (Australia)	Anand Amritraj / Vijay Amritraj; John Alexander / Colin Dibley	17; 15	6; 8	6; 3	16; 18	6; 4
4	(India) (Australia)	Jasjit Singh; John Alexander	6; 8	4; 6	3; 6
5	(India) (Australia)	Vijay Amritraj; Bob Giltinan	6; 1	5; 7	6; 4	6; 4

=== 1975 ===
Eastern Zone
Semifinals

Australia
4
Memorial Drive Park, Adelaide, Australia
10–12 January 1975
Grass

Japan
1

			1	2	3	4	5
1	(Australia) (Japan)	John Newcombe; Jun Kuki	6; 1	6; 2	6; 3
2	(Australia) (Japan)	Phil Dent; Toshiro Sakai	1; 6	6; 4	6; 2	4; 6	4; 6
3	(Australia) (Japan)	John Alexander / John Newcombe; Kenichi Hirai / Toshiro Sakai	6; 3	5; 7	6; 1	3; 6	6; 3
4	(Australia) (Japan)	John Newcombe; Toshiro Sakai	6; 4	6; 3	6; 3
5	(Australia) (Japan)	Phil Dent; Jun Kuki	8; 6	6; 4	6; 3

Eastern Zone
Final

New Zealand
0
Stanley Street, Auckland, New Zealand
28 February–2 March 1975
Grass

Australia
4

			1	2	3	4	5
1	(New Zealand) (Australia)	Brian Fairlie; John Newcombe	5; 7	3; 6	5; 7
2	(New Zealand) (Australia)	Onny Parun; Ken Rosewall	2; 6	4; 6	2; 6
3	(New Zealand) (Australia)	Brian Fairlie / Onny Parun; Geoff Masters / John Newcombe	4; 6	4; 6	5; 7
4	(New Zealand) (Australia)	Brian Fairlie; Ken Rosewall	1; 6	11; 9	5; 7	7; 9
5	(New Zealand) (Australia)	Onny Parun; Geoff Masters	6; 3	10; 8				not completed

Semifinals

Czechoslovakia
3
Štvanice Stadium, Prague, Czechoslovakia
26–28 September 1975
Clay

Australia
1

			1	2	3	4	5
1	(Czechoslovakia) (Australia)	Jan Kodeš; John Alexander	6; 4	2; 6	7; 5	6; 4
2	(Czechoslovakia) (Australia)	Jiří Hřebec; Tony Roche	3; 6	4; 6	6; 1	6; 3	6; 3
3	(Czechoslovakia) (Australia)	František Pála / Vladimír Zedník; John Alexander / Phil Dent	3; 6	6; 3	2; 6	3; 6
4	(Czechoslovakia) (Australia)	Jan Kodeš; Tony Roche	6; 3	6; 1	6; 4
5	(Czechoslovakia) (Australia)	Jiří Hřebec; John Alexander	6; 8	3; 6	6; 1	6; 6		not completed

=== 1976 ===
Eastern Zone
Semifinals

Australia
5
Domain Centre, Hobart, Australia
9–11 January 1976
Grass

Indonesia
0

			1	2	3	4	5
1	(Australia) (Indonesia)	Tony Roche; Atet Wijono	6; 0	6; 0	6; 0
2	(Australia) (Indonesia)	John Newcombe; Gondo Widjojo	6; 1	6; 2	6; 5
3	(Australia) (Indonesia)	John Newcombe / Tony Roche; Gondo Widjojo / Atet Wijono	6; 3	6; 2	6; 1
4	(Australia) (Indonesia)	John Newcombe; Atet Wijono	6; 2	6; 1	6; 1
5	(Australia) (Indonesia)	Tony Roche; Yustedjo Tarik	6; 3	6; 2	6; 2

Eastern Zone
Final

Australia
3
Milton Courts, Brisbane, Australia
27 February–1 March 1976
Grass

New Zealand
1

			1	2	3	4	5
1	(Australia) (New Zealand)	Ross Case; Brian Fairlie	6; 3	8; 10	1; 6	6; 2	4; 6
2	(Australia) (New Zealand)	John Newcombe; Onny Parun	8; 6	6; 3	7; 5
3	(Australia) (New Zealand)	John Newcombe / Tony Roche; Brian Fairlie / Onny Parun	6; 1	3; 6	6; 3	7; 5
4	(Australia) (New Zealand)	John Newcombe; Brian Fairlie	8; 6	5; 7	11; 9	6; 3
5	(Australia) (New Zealand)	Ross Case; Onny Parun						not played

Semifinals

Italy
3
Foro Italico, Rome, Italy
24–27 September 1976
Clay

Australia
2

			1	2	3	4	5
1	(Italy) (Australia)	Corrado Barazzutti; John Newcombe	7; 5	6; 1	6; 4
2	(Italy) (Australia)	Adriano Panatta; John Alexander	5; 7	3; 6	4; 6
3	(Italy) (Australia)	Paolo Bertolucci / Adriano Panatta; John Newcombe / Tony Roche	6; 3	6; 4	6; 3
4	(Italy) (Australia)	Corrado Barazzutti; John Alexander	2; 6	2; 6	7; 5	6; 4	2; 6
5	(Italy) (Australia)	Adriano Panatta; John Newcombe	5; 7	8; 6	6; 4	6; 2

=== 1977 ===
Eastern Zone
Semifinals

Australia
5
Royal King's Park Tennis Club, Perth, Australia
21–23 January 1977
Grass

India
0

			1	2	3	4	5
1	(Australia) (India)	Mark Edmondson; Vijay Amritraj	6; 2	7; 5	2; 6	8; 6
2	(Australia) (India)	John Alexander; Anand Amritraj	6; 0	6; 2	6; 1
3	(Australia) (India)	John Alexander / Phil Dent; Anand Amritraj / Vijay Amritraj	6; 3	6; 2	6; 3
4	(Australia) (India)	Mark Edmondson; Anand Amritraj	6; 2	9; 7	10; 8
5	(Australia) (India)	Phil Dent; Sashi Menon	9; 7	11; 9	6; 4

Eastern Zone
Final

New Zealand
0
Stanley Street, Auckland, New Zealand
11–13 February 1977
Grass

Australia
4

			1	2	3	4	5
1	(New Zealand) (Australia)	Onny Parun; Mark Edmondson	3; 6	5; 7	7; 5	4; 6
2	(New Zealand) (Australia)	Brian Fairlie; John Alexander	3; 6	2; 6	3; 6
3	(New Zealand) (Australia)	Brian Fairlie / Onny Parun; John Alexander / Phil Dent	1; 6	6; 3	6; 4	1; 6	4; 6
4	(New Zealand) (Australia)	Onny Parun; John Alexander	11; 9	6; 4	4; 6	3; 6	4; 6
5	(New Zealand) (Australia)	Chris Lewis; Mark Edmondson	4; 6	6; 4	4; 6			not completed

Semifinals

Argentina
2
Buenos Aires Lawn Tennis Club, Buenos Aires, Argentina
14–16 September 1977
Clay

Australia
3

			1	2	3	4	5
1	(Argentina) (Australia)	Guillermo Vilas; Phil Dent	6; 2	4; 6	7; 5	6; 3
2	(Argentina) (Australia)	Ricardo Cano; John Alexander	4; 6	0; 6	0; 6
3	(Argentina) (Australia)	Ricardo Cano / Guillermo Vilas; John Newcombe / Phil Dent	2; 6	6; 4	7; 9	6; 4	2; 6
4	(Argentina) (Australia)	Ricardo Cano; Phil Dent	4; 6	4; 6	3; 6
5	(Argentina) (Australia)	Guillermo Vilas; John Alexander	6; 4	7; 5	4; 6	6; 2

Final

Australia
3
White City Stadium, Sydney, Australia
2–4 December 1977
Grass

Italy
1

			1	2	3	4	5
1	(Australia) (Italy)	Tony Roche; Adriano Panatta	6; 3	6; 4	6; 4
2	(Australia) (Italy)	John Alexander; Corrado Barazzutti	6; 2	8; 6	4; 6	6; 2
3	(Australia) (Italy)	John Alexander / Phil Dent; Paolo Bertolucci / Adriano Panatta	4; 6	4; 6	5; 7
4	(Australia) (Italy)	John Alexander; Adriano Panatta	6; 4	4; 6	2; 6	8; 6	11; 9
5	(Australia) (Italy)	Tony Roche; Corrado Barazzutti	12; 12					not completed

=== 1978 ===
Eastern Zone
Semifinals

Japan
0
Denen Coliseum, Tokyo, Japan
20–22 January 1978
Clay

Australia
5

			1	2	3	4	5
1	(Japan) (Australia)	Jun Kuki; Geoff Masters	1; 6	3; 6	2; 6
2	(Japan) (Australia)	Kenichi Hirai; Phil Dent	2; 6	8; 10	0; 6
3	(Japan) (Australia)	Kenichi Hirai / Jun Kamiwazumi; Geoff Masters / Allan Stone	4; 6	4; 6	1; 6
4	(Japan) (Australia)	Jun Kuki; Kim Warwick	6; 2	7; 5	3; 6	3; 6	1; 6
5	(Japan) (Australia)	Tsuyoshi Fukui; Allan Stone	3; 6	5; 7	6; 3	6; 2	2; 6

Eastern Zone
Final

Australia
4
Memorial Drive, Adelaide, Australia
24–26 February 1978
Grass

New Zealand
0

			1	2	3	4	5
1	(Australia) (New Zealand)	Tony Roche; Chris Lewis	13; 11	6; 3	6; 2
2	(Australia) (New Zealand)	John Alexander; Brian Fairlie	6; 4	6; 4	6; 4
3	(Australia) (New Zealand)	John Alexander / Tony Roche; Brian Fairlie / Chris Lewis	6; 3	6; 4	12; 14	4; 6	6; 1
4	(Australia) (New Zealand)	John Alexander; Chris Lewis	8; 10	16; 14	6; 1	9; 7
5	(Australia) (New Zealand)	Allan Stone; Brian Fairlie	2; 6	6; 1				not completed

Semifinals

Great Britain
3
National Sports Centre, London, United Kingdom
6–8 October 1978
Carpet (indoors)

Australia
2

			1	2	3	4	5
1	(United Kingdom) (Australia)	Buster Mottram; Tony Roche	8; 6	3; 6	7; 5	6; 4
2	(United Kingdom) (Australia)	John Lloyd; John Alexander	7; 5	6; 2	6; 2
3	(United Kingdom) (Australia)	Mark Cox / David Lloyd; Ross Case / Geoff Masters	8; 6	3; 6	6; 4	6; 3
4	(United Kingdom) (Australia)	John Lloyd; Tony Roche	3; 6	3; 6	2; 6
5	(United Kingdom) (Australia)	Buster Mottram; John Alexander	2; 6	3; 6	2; 6

=== 1979 ===
Eastern Zone
Semifinals

India
2
Madras Gymkhana Club, Madras, India
9–12 February 1979
Clay

Australia
3

			1	2	3	4	5
1	(India) (Australia)	Sashi Menon; Ross Case	7; 9	1; 6	2; 6
2	(India) (Australia)	Vijay Amritraj; John Alexander	4; 6	6; 8	6; 1	3; 6
3	(India) (Australia)	Anand Amritraj / Vijay Amritraj; Ross Case / Geoff Masters	6; 8	6; 4	6; 1	6; 3
4	(India) (Australia)	Vijay Amritraj; Ross Case	7; 5	6; 1	7; 5
5	(India) (Australia)	Sashi Menon; John Alexander	8; 6	6; 3	3; 6	3; 6	4; 6

Eastern Zone
Final

New Zealand
2
Wilding Park, Christchurch, New Zealand
16–19 March 1979
Grass

Australia
3

			1	2	3	4	5
1	(New Zealand) (Australia)	Onny Parun; Mark Edmondson	3; 6	6; 3	6; 3	6; 2
2	(New Zealand) (Australia)	Russell Simpson; John Alexander	4; 6	6; 4	5; 7	4; 6
3	(New Zealand) (Australia)	Onny Parun / Russell Simpson; John Alexander / Phil Dent	4; 6	7; 9	3; 6
4	(New Zealand) (Australia)	Russell Simpson; Mark Edmondson	3; 6	2; 6	4; 6
5	(New Zealand) (Australia)	Onny Parun; John Alexander	7; 5	6; 3	6; 3

Semifinals

Australia
1
White City Stadium, Sydney, Australia
5–8 October 1979
Grass

United States
4

			1	2	3	4	5
1	(Australia) (United States)	Mark Edmondson; Vitas Gerulaitis	8; 6	16; 14	8; 10	3; 6	3; 6
2	(Australia) (United States)	John Alexander; John McEnroe	7; 9	2; 6	7; 9
3	(Australia) (United States)	John Alexander / Phil Dent; Bob Lutz / Stan Smith	9; 7	6; 4	6; 4
4	(Australia) (United States)	John Alexander; Vitas Gerulaitis	7; 5	4; 6	6; 8	2; 6
5	(Australia) (United States)	Mark Edmondson; John McEnroe	3; 6	4; 6

== See also ==
- Australia Davis Cup team results (1905–1949)
- Australia Davis Cup team results (1980–2009)
- Australia Davis Cup team results (2010–present)
