= 1974 Davis Cup Eastern Zone =

International tennis competition

The Eastern Zone was one of the three regional zones of the 1974 Davis Cup.

11 teams entered the Eastern Zone, with 9 teams competing in the preliminary round to join the previous year's finalists Australia and India in the main draw. The winner of the main draw went on to compete in the Inter-Zonal Zone against the winners of the Americas Zone and Europe Zone.

India defeated Australia in the final and progressed to the Inter-Zonal Zone. With a total of 327 games, the Eastern Zone final set the Davis Cup record for the most games in a tie, still standing as of 2019.

== Preliminary rounds ==
=== Draw ===
First Round
Pakistan
bye
Malaysia
bye
Manila, Philippines
Philippines	3
Indonesia	1
Hong Kong
bye
bye
South Vietnam
Tokyo, Japan
Japan	3
South Korea	0
bye
Chinese Taipei
bye
Sri Lanka

Qualifying Round
Karachi, Pakistan
Pakistan	4
Malaysia	1
Manila, Philippines
Philippines	5
Hong Kong	0
Tokyo, Japan
South Vietnam	0
Japan	3
Chinese Taipei	w/o
Sri Lanka

=== First round ===
Philippines vs. Indonesia

Philippines
3
Manila, Philippines
5–7 April 1974

Indonesia
1

			1	2	3	4	5
1	(Philippines) (Indonesia)	Eduardo Cruz; Atet Wijono	6; 1	6; 3	6; 2
2	(Philippines) (Indonesia)	Romeo Rafon; Gondo Widjojo	2; 6	4; 6	6; 3	6; 3	6; 2
3	(Philippines) (Indonesia)	Eduardo Cruz / Jesus Hernandez; Gondo Widjojo / Atet Wijono	1; 6	6; 2	6; 0	6; 2
4	(Philippines) (Indonesia)	Bien Dimalanta; Hadiman	11; 9	4; 6	0; 6	3; 6
5	(Philippines) (Indonesia)	Eduardo Cruz; Gondo Widjojo						not played

Japan vs. South Korea

Japan
3
Tokyo, Japan
5–7 April 1974

South Korea
0

			1	2	3	4	5
1	(Japan) (South Korea)	Kenichi Hirai; Kim Sung-bae	6; 4	6; 4	6; 4
2	(Japan) (South Korea)	Toshiro Sakai; Kim Moon-il	6; 3	6; 0	6; 1
3	(Japan) (South Korea)	Kenichi Hirai / Kiyoshi Tanabe; Kim Moon-il / Kim Sung-bae	6; 4	6; 1	6; 1
4	(Japan) (South Korea)	Kenichi Hirai; Kim Moon-il						not played
5	(Japan) (South Korea)	Toshiro Sakai; Kim Sung-bae						not played

=== Qualifying round ===
Pakistan vs. Malaysia

Pakistan
4
Karachi, Pakistan
5–7 April 1974

Malaysia
1

			1	2	3	4	5
1	(Pakistan) (Malaysia)	Saeed Meer; Mohammed Akbar-Baba	6; 3	6; 0	6; 1
2	(Pakistan) (Malaysia)	Munawar Iqbal; Lee Wai-ching	6; 0	6; 4	3; 6	6; 4
3	(Pakistan) (Malaysia)	Munawar Iqbal / Saeed Meer; Chow Weng-wah / Lee Wai-ching	6; 4	8; 6	6; 3
4	(Pakistan) (Malaysia)	Ismail Majeed; Lee Wai-ching	6; 3	6; 2	6; 3
5	(Pakistan) (Malaysia)	Fazal Mahmoud; Chow Weng-wah	3; 6	6; 2	4; 6	1; 2		retired

Philippines vs. Hong Kong

Philippines
5
Manila, Philippines
12–14 April 1974

Hong Kong
0

			1	2	3	4	5
1	(Philippines) (Hong Kong)	Eduardo Cruz; Charles Chang	6; 1	6; 0	6; 2
2	(Philippines) (Hong Kong)	Romeo Rafon; Hy Ny	6; 2	6; 0	6; 1
3	(Philippines) (Hong Kong)	Bien Dimalanta / Jesus Hernandez; Hy Ny / Hans Rusli	6; 0	6; 2	6; 1
4	(Philippines) (Hong Kong)	Bien Dimalanta; Hans Rusli	6; 4	6; 2	6; 1
5	(Philippines) (Hong Kong)	Romeo Rafon; Ma Yat-lung	6; 0	6; 0	6; 4

Japan vs. South Vietnam

Japan
3
Tokyo, Japan
19–21 April 1974

South Vietnam
0

			1	2	3	4	5
1	(Japan) (South Vietnam)	Toshiro Sakai; Đinh Quốc Tuấn	6; 0	6; 2	6; 0
2	(Japan) (South Vietnam)	Kenichi Hirai; Võ Văn Bảy	6; 0	6; 3	6; 1
3	(Japan) (South Vietnam)	Kenichi Hirai / Toshiro Sakai; Lý Alline An / Võ Văn Bảy	6; 3	6; 1	6; 4
4	(Japan) (South Vietnam)	Toshiro Sakai; Võ Văn Bảy						not played
5	(Japan) (South Vietnam)	Kenichi Hirai; Đinh Quốc Tuấn						not played

== Main Draw ==
=== Draw ===
Quarterfinals; 26–28 April
Rawalpindi, Pakistan
Australia
bye
Lahore, Pakistan
Pakistan	4
Philippines	1
Taipei, Taiwan (hard)
Chinese Taipei	0
Japan	3
bye
India

Semifinals; 3–5 May
Rawalpindi, Pakistan
Australia	3
Pakistan	0
Kanpur, India
Japan	1
India	4

Final; 10–12 May
Calcutta, India
Australia	2
India	3

=== Quarterfinals ===
Pakistan vs. Philippines

Pakistan
4
Lahore, Pakistan
26–28 April 1974

Philippines
1

			1	2	3	4	5
1	(Pakistan) (Philippines)	Munawar Iqbal; Eduardo Cruz	4; 6	6; 8	2; 6
2	(Pakistan) (Philippines)	Saeed Meer; Romeo Rafon	6; 2	6; 2	6; 1
3	(Pakistan) (Philippines)	Munawar Iqbal / Saeed Meer; Eduardo Cruz / Jesus Hernandez	6; 8	6; 4	6; 4	6; 2
4	(Pakistan) (Philippines)	Saeed Meer; Eduardo Cruz	10; 8	6; 0	6; 1
5	(Pakistan) (Philippines)	Meer Mohammed Khan; Bien Dimalanta	6; 3	6; 4	6; 2

Chinese Taipei vs. Japan

Chinese Taipei
0
Taipei, Taiwan
26–28 April 1974
Hard

Japan
3

			1	2	3	4	5
1	(Chinese Taipei) (Japan)	Lin Chi-yuan; Kiyoshi Tanabe	0; 6	0; 6	2; 6
2	(Chinese Taipei) (Japan)	Tang Fu-shun; Toshiro Sakai	1; 6	2; 6	2; 6
3	(Chinese Taipei) (Japan)	Lin Chi-yuan / Tang Fu-shun; Kenichi Hirai / Kiyoshi Tanabe	3; 6	1; 6	1; 6
4	(Chinese Taipei) (Japan)	Tang Fu-shun; Kiyoshi Tanabe						not played
5	(Chinese Taipei) (Japan)	Lin Chi-yuan; Toshiro Sakai						not played

=== Semifinals ===
Pakistan vs. Australia

Pakistan
0
Rawalpindi, Pakistan
3–5 May 1974

Australia
3

			1	2	3	4	5
1	(Pakistan) (Australia)	Haroon Rahim; Tony Roche	7; 5	3; 6	1; 6	3; 6
2	(Pakistan) (Australia)	Saeed Meer; Syd Ball	4; 6	5; 7	14; 16
3	(Pakistan) (Australia)	Saeed Meer / Haroon Rahim; Colin Dibley / Tony Roche	18; 20	4; 6	3; 6
4	(Pakistan) (Australia)	Saeed Meer; Tony Roche						not played
5	(Pakistan) (Australia)	Haroon Rahim; Syd Ball						not played

India vs. Japan

India
4
Kanpur, India
3–5 May 1974

Japan
1

			1	2	3	4	5
1	(India) (Japan)	Vijay Amritraj; Toshiro Sakai	3; 6	6; 0	3; 6	6; 2	6; 2
2	(India) (Japan)	Anand Amritraj; Kenichi Hirai	6; 4	12; 10	6; 3
3	(India) (Japan)	Anand Amritraj / Vijay Amritraj; Kenichi Hirai / Toshiro Sakai	6; 3	8; 6	8; 6
4	(India) (Japan)	Sashi Menon; Kiyoshi Tanabe	6; 3	6; 2	6; 2
5	(India) (Japan)	Jasjit Singh; Toshiro Sakai	6; 4	3; 6	2; 6	3; 6

=== Final ===
India
3
Calcutta, India
10–12 May 1974

Australia
2

			1	2	3	4	5
1	(India) (Australia)	Jasjit Singh; Bob Giltinan	11; 9	9; 11	12; 10	8; 6
2	(India) (Australia)	Vijay Amritraj; John Alexander	12; 14	15; 17	8; 6	2; 6
3	(India) (Australia)	Anand Amritraj / Vijay Amritraj; John Alexander / Colin Dibley	17; 15	6; 8	6; 3	16; 18	6; 4
4	(India) (Australia)	Jasjit Singh; John Alexander	6; 8	4; 6	3; 6
5	(India) (Australia)	Vijay Amritraj; Bob Giltinan	6; 1	5; 7	6; 4	6; 4
