= 1973 Davis Cup Eastern Zone =

International tennis competition

The Eastern Zone was one of the three regional zones of the 1973 Davis Cup.

10 teams entered the Eastern Zone, with 8 teams competing in the preliminary round to join the previous year's finalists Australia and India in the main draw. The winner of the main draw went on to compete in the Inter-Zonal Zone against the winners of the Americas Zone and Europe Zone.

Australia defeated India in the final and progressed to the Inter-Zonal Zone.

== Preliminary round ==
=== Draw ===
Preliminary Round; 23–28 March
Seoul, South Korea
South Korea	1
Japan	4
Jakarta, Indonesia
Indonesia	5
Hong Kong	0
Kuala Lumpur, Malaysia
Malaysia	0
Pakistan	3
Penang, Malaysia (grass)
South Vietnam	3
Sri Lanka	0

Semifinals

Final

=== Results ===
South Korea vs. Japan

South Korea
1
Seoul, South Korea
23–25 March 1973

Japan
4

			1	2	3	4	5
1	(South Korea) (Japan)	Kim Sung-bae; Jun Kamiwazumi	8; 6	6; 1	6; 4
2	(South Korea) (Japan)	Kim Moon-il; Jun Kuki	4; 6	4; 6	2; 6
3	(South Korea) (Japan)	Chung Yong-ho / Kim Moon-il; Jun Kamiwazumi / Toshiro Sakai	2; 6	2; 6	6; 2	6; 3	3; 6
4	(South Korea) (Japan)	Kim Moon-il; Jun Kamiwazumi	2; 6	6; 1	0; 6	0; 6
5	(South Korea) (Japan)	Kim Sung-bae; Jun Kuki	5; 7	5; 7	0; 6

Indonesia vs. Hong Kong

Indonesia
5
Jakarta, Indonesia
26–28 March 1973

Hong Kong
0

			1	2	3	4	5
1	(Indonesia) (Hong Kong)	Gondo Widjojo; Tao Po	6; 0	6; 0	6; 0
2	(Indonesia) (Hong Kong)	Atet Wijono; Kenneth Tsui	6; 2	6; 1	6; 2
3	(Indonesia) (Hong Kong)	Gondo Widjojo / Atet Wijono; Kenneth Tsui / Winston Wei-Chung	6; 3	6; 3	6; 4
4	(Indonesia) (Hong Kong)	Yustedjo Tarik; Kenneth Tsui	6; 1	6; 2	6; 3
5	(Indonesia) (Hong Kong)	Samudra Sangitan; Tao Po	7; 5	6; 0	6; 2

Malaysia vs. Pakistan

Malaysia
0
Kuala Lumpur, Malaysia
23–25 March 1973

Pakistan
3

			1	2	3	4	5
1	(Malaysia) (Pakistan)	Munawar Iqbal; Zainuddin Meah	6; 0	6; 4	6; 1
2	(Malaysia) (Pakistan)	Saeed Meer; Sultan-Aman Azman	6; 0	6; 0	6; 2
3	(Malaysia) (Pakistan)	Munawar Iqbal / Saeed Meer; Weng-Wah Chow / Wai-Ching Lee	6; 2	6; 4	6; 2
4	(Malaysia) (Pakistan)	Munawar Iqbal; Sultan-Aman Azman	6; 1	1; 4				not completed
5	(Malaysia) (Pakistan)	Saeed Meer; Zainuddin Meah						not played

South Vietnam vs. Sri Lanka

South Vietnam
3
Penang, Malaysia
23–25 March 1973
Grass

Sri Lanka
0

			1	2	3	4	5
1	(South Vietnam) (Sri Lanka)	Võ Văn Bảy; Senaka Kumara	6; 4	6; 3	4; 6	6; 4
2	(South Vietnam) (Sri Lanka)	Võ Văn Thành; Bernard Pinto	6; 4	6; 3	4; 6	6; 4
3	(South Vietnam) (Sri Lanka)	Lý Alline An / Võ Văn Bảy; Senaka Kumara / Bernard Pinto	6; 1	6; 2	12; 14	6; 4
4	(South Vietnam) (Sri Lanka)	Võ Văn Bảy; Bernard Pinto						not played
5	(South Vietnam) (Sri Lanka)	Võ Văn Thành; Senaka Kumara						not played

== Main Draw ==
=== Draw ===
Quarterfinals; 9–15 April
Australia
bye
Tokyo, Japan
Japan	3
Indonesia	0
Kuala Lumpur, Malaysia (grass)
Pakistan	4
South Vietnam	1
bye
India

Semifinals; 20–22 April
Tokyo, Japan
Australia	4
Japan	1
Kuala Lumpur, Malaysia (grass)
Pakistan	0
India	4

Final; 4–6 May
Madras, India
Australia	4
India	0

=== Quarterfinals ===
Japan vs. Indonesia

Japan
3
Tokyo, Japan
13–15 April 1973

Indonesia
0

			1	2	3	4	5
1	(Japan) (Indonesia)	Jun Kamiwazumi; Gondo Widjojo	6; 1	6; 4	7; 5
2	(Japan) (Indonesia)	Toshiro Sakai; Atet Wijono	6; 3	6; 4	6; 1
3	(Japan) (Indonesia)	Kenichi Hirai / Jun Kamiwazumi; Gondo Widjojo / Atet Wijono	6; 3	6; 2	7; 5
4	(Japan) (Indonesia)	Jun Kamiwazumi; Atet Wijono						not played
5	(Japan) (Indonesia)	Toshiro Sakai; Gondo Widjojo						not played

Pakistan vs. South Vietnam

Pakistan
4
Kuala Lumpur, Malaysia
9–11 April 1973
Grass

South Vietnam
1

			1	2	3	4	5
1	(Pakistan) (South Vietnam)	Saeed Meer; Võ Văn Thành	6; 2	6; 4	5; 7	9; 11	6; 2
2	(Pakistan) (South Vietnam)	Munawar Iqbal; Võ Văn Bảy	6; 4	6; 4	8; 6
3	(Pakistan) (South Vietnam)	Munawar Iqbal / Saeed Meer; Lý Alline An / Võ Văn Bảy	6; 4	3; 6	4; 6	6; 3	10; 8
4	(Pakistan) (South Vietnam)	Munawar Iqbal; Võ Văn Thành	6; 4	6; 3	6; 1
5	(Pakistan) (South Vietnam)	Saeed Meer; Võ Văn Bảy	8; 6	0; 6	3; 6	2; 6

=== Semifinals ===
Japan vs. Australia

Japan
1
Tokyo, Japan
20–22 April 1973

Australia
4

			1	2	3	4	5
1	(Japan) (Australia)	Toshiro Sakai; Mal Anderson	2; 6	7; 9	6; 3	1; 6
2	(Japan) (Australia)	Jun Kamiwazumi; John Newcombe	2; 6	5; 7	1; 6
3	(Japan) (Australia)	Jun Kamiwazumi / Toshiro Sakai; Geoff Masters / John Newcombe	4; 6	5; 7	4; 6
4	(Japan) (Australia)	Toshiro Sakai; John Newcombe	8; 6	6; 4	4; 6	0; 6	6; 3
5	(Japan) (Australia)	Jun Kamiwazumi; Mal Anderson	6; 4	6; 4	4; 6	4; 6	6; 8

India vs. Pakistan

India
4
Kuala Lumpur, Malaysia
20–22 April 1973
Grass

Pakistan
0

			1	2	3	4	5
1	(India) (Pakistan)	Vijay Amritraj; Saeed Meer	6; 1	6; 4	8; 6
2	(India) (Pakistan)	Anand Amritraj; Munawar Iqbal	6; 2	6; 2	6; 2
3	(India) (Pakistan)	Anand Amritraj / Vijay Amritraj; Munawar Iqbal / Saeed Meer	6; 3	6; 4	6; 4
4	(India) (Pakistan)	Vijay Amritraj; Munawar Iqbal	2; 6	6; 3	6; 4	2; 3		retired
5	(India) (Pakistan)	Chiradip Mukerjea; Saeed Meer	4; 6					not completed

=== Final ===
India vs. Australia

India
0
Madras, India
4–6 May 1973

Australia
4

			1	2	3	4	5
1	(India) (Australia)	Anand Amritraj; John Newcombe	2; 6	1; 6	0; 6
2	(India) (Australia)	Vijay Amritraj; Mal Anderson	1; 6	2; 6	1; 6
3	(India) (Australia)	Vijay Amritraj / Premjit Lall; Geoff Masters / John Newcombe	6; 4	2; 6	5; 7	3; 6
4	(India) (Australia)	Premjit Lall; John Cooper	6; 4	0; 6	6; 8	1; 6
5	(India) (Australia)	Vijay Amritraj; John Newcombe	10; 12	6; 3				not completed
