= 1976 Davis Cup Eastern Zone =

International tennis competition

The Eastern Zone was one of the three regional zones of the 1976 Davis Cup.

12 teams entered the Eastern Zone, with 10 teams competing in the preliminary round to join the previous year's finalists Australia and New Zealand in the main draw. The winner of the main draw went on to compete in the Inter-Zonal Zone against the winners of the Americas Zone and Europe Zone.

Australia defeated New Zealand in the final and progressed to the Inter-Zonal Zone.

== Preliminary rounds ==
=== Draw ===
First Round
Indonesia
bye
South Korea
bye
Sri Lanka
bye
Kuala Lumpur, Malaysia
Malaysia	0
Pakistan	5
Amritsar, India
India	5
Thailand	0
bye
Japan
bye
Philippines
bye
Chinese Taipei

Qualifying Round
Jakarta, Indonesia
Indonesia	3
South Korea	2
Colombo, Sri Lanka (clay)
Sri Lanka	0
Pakistan	4
Tokyo, Japan
India	3
Japan	2
Taipei, Taiwan (hard)
Philippines	4
Chinese Taipei	0

=== First round ===
Malaysia vs. Pakistan

Malaysia
0
Kuala Lumpur, Malaysia
26–28 September 1975

Pakistan
5

			1	2	3	4	5
1	(Malaysia) (Pakistan)	Tan Poh-seng; Meer Mohammed Khan	2; 6	2; 6	2; 6
2	(Malaysia) (Pakistan)	Mohammed Akbar-Baba; Saeed Meer	3; 6	0; 6	3; 6
3	(Malaysia) (Pakistan)	Zainuddin Meah / Tan Poh-seng; Saeed Meer / Meer Mohammed Khan	2; 6	4; 6	5; 7
4	(Malaysia) (Pakistan)	Zainuddin Meah; Meer Mohammed Khan	9; 7	2; 6	0; 6	3; 6
5	(Malaysia) (Pakistan)	Tan Poh-seng; Saeed Meer	4; 6	0; 6	2; 6

India vs. Thailand

India
5
Amritsar, India
26–28 September 1975

Thailand
0

			1	2	3	4	5
1	(India) (Thailand)	Vijay Amritraj; Somparn Champisri	6; 2	6; 1	6; 0
2	(India) (Thailand)	Anand Amritraj; Pichet Boratisa	6; 3	6; 1	6; 0
3	(India) (Thailand)	Anand Amritraj / Vijay Amritraj; Pichet Boratisa / Somparn Champisri	6; 2	6; 2	6; 4
4	(India) (Thailand)	Ramanathan Krishnan; Pichet Boratisa	6; 4	6; 1	4; 6	6; 3
5	(India) (Thailand)	Chiradip Mukerjea; Somparn Champisri	6; 3	9; 7	6; 1

=== Qualifying round ===
Indonesia vs. South Korea

Indonesia
3
Jakarta, Indonesia
30 September–1 October 1975

South Korea
2

			1	2	3	4	5
1	(Indonesia) (South Korea)	Atet Wijono; Kim Moon-il	8; 6	4; 6	9; 11	3; 6
2	(Indonesia) (South Korea)	Gondo Widjojo; Kim Sung-bae	6; 3	1; 6	7; 9	2; 6
3	(Indonesia) (South Korea)	Hadiman / Yustedjo Tarik; Choi Boo-kil / Ju Chang-nam	6; 4	8; 6	6; 1
4	(Indonesia) (South Korea)	Atet Wijono; Kim Sung-bae	6; 2	6; 4	9; 7
5	(Indonesia) (South Korea)	Gondo Widjojo; Kim Moon-il	6; 2	6; 3	7; 5

Sri Lanka vs. Pakistan

Sri Lanka
0
Sri Lanka LTA, Colombo, Sri Lanka
30 September–1 October 1975
Clay

Pakistan
4

			1	2	3	4	5
1	(Sri Lanka) (Pakistan)	Lassantha Fernando; Meer Mohammed Khan	3; 6	6; 2	1; 6	0; 6
2	(Sri Lanka) (Pakistan)	Ajit Perera; Saeed Meer	4; 6	1; 6	0; 6
3	(Sri Lanka) (Pakistan)	Lassantha Fernando / Suresh Melvani; Saeed Meer / Meer Mohammed Khan	3; 6	4; 6	3; 6
4	(Sri Lanka) (Pakistan)	Lassantha Fernando; Saeed Meer	2; 6	4; 6	5; 7
5	(Sri Lanka) (Pakistan)	Ajit Perera; Tayyab Iftikhar	6; 2	4; 6	3; 3			not completed

Japan vs. India

Japan
2
Tokyo, Japan
30 September–1 October 1975

India
3

			1	2	3	4	5
1	(Japan) (India)	Toshiro Sakai; Vijay Amritraj	5; 7	5; 7	6; 0	2; 6
2	(Japan) (India)	Jun Kamiwazumi; Anand Amritraj	7; 5	8; 6	9; 7
3	(Japan) (India)	Kenichi Hirai / Toshiro Sakai; Anand Amritraj / Vijay Amritraj	3; 6	6; 4	6; 2	3; 6	4; 6
4	(Japan) (India)	Toshiro Sakai; Anand Amritraj	6; 3	0; 6	4; 6	3; 6
5	(Japan) (India)	Jun Kuki; Sashi Menon	4; 6	6; 3	6; 1	6; 4

Chinese Taipei vs. Philippines

Chinese Taipei
0
Taipei, Taiwan
30 September–1 October 1975
Hard

Philippines
4

			1	2	3	4	5
1	(Chinese Taipei) (Philippines)	Tang Fu-shun; Eduardo Cruz	4; 6	1; 6	2; 6
2	(Chinese Taipei) (Philippines)	Lin Den-wen; Micky Dominguez	1; 6	0; 6	1; 6
3	(Chinese Taipei) (Philippines)	Lin Den-wen / Tang Fu-shun; Eduardo Cruz / Micky Dominguez	3; 6	1; 6	3; 6
4	(Chinese Taipei) (Philippines)	Lin Yung-yan; Alexander Marcial	0; 6	0; 6	2; 6
5	(Chinese Taipei) (Philippines)	Tang Fu-shun; Micky Dominguez

== Main draw ==
=== Draw ===
Quarterfinals; 28 November–21 December 1975
Australia
bye
Karachi, Pakistan
Indonesia	4
Pakistan	1
Manila, Philippines
India	4
Philippines	0
bye
New Zealand

Semifinals; 9–18 January
Hobart, Australia (grass)
Australia	5
Indonesia	0
Auckland, New Zealand (grass)
India	2
New Zealand	3

Final; 27 February–1 March
Brisbane, Australia (grass)
Australia	3
New Zealand	1

=== Quarterfinals ===
Pakistan vs. Indonesia

Pakistan
1
Karachi, Pakistan
28–30 November 1975

Indonesia
4

			1	2	3	4	5
1	(Pakistan) (Indonesia)	Saeed Meer; Gondo Widjojo	2; 6	12; 10	9; 7	6; 2
2	(Pakistan) (Indonesia)	Meer Mohammed Khan; Atet Wijono	1; 6	4; 6	4; 6
3	(Pakistan) (Indonesia)	Altaf Hussain / Saeed Meer; Gondo Widjojo / Atet Wijono	2; 6	5; 7	9; 11
4	(Pakistan) (Indonesia)	Saeed Meer; Atet Wijono	6; 3	2; 6	3; 6	6; 3	4; 6
5	(Pakistan) (Indonesia)	Meer Mohammed Khan; Gondo Widjojo	7; 9	1; 6

Philippines vs. India

Philippines
0
Manila, Philippines
19–21 December 1975

India
4

			1	2	3	4	5
1	(Philippines) (India)	Eduardo Cruz; Chiradip Mukerjea	6; 3	4; 6	3; 6	6; 3	4; 6
2	(Philippines) (India)	Micky Dominguez; Sashi Menon	2; 6	4; 6	3; 6
3	(Philippines) (India)	Eduardo Cruz / Micky Dominguez; Sashi Menon / Chiradip Mukerjea	4; 6	2; 6	6; 4	4; 6
4	(Philippines) (India)	Micky Dominguez; Chiradip Mukerjea	6; 2	6; 2	3; 6	4; 6	7; 9
5	(Philippines) (India)	Eduardo Cruz; Sashi Menon						not played

=== Semifinals ===
Australia vs. Indonesia

Australia
5
Domain Centre, Hobart, Australia
9–11 January 1976
Grass

Indonesia
0

			1	2	3	4	5
1	(Australia) (Indonesia)	Tony Roche; Atet Wijono	6; 0	6; 0	6; 0
2	(Australia) (Indonesia)	John Newcombe; Gondo Widjojo	6; 1	6; 2	6; 5
3	(Australia) (Indonesia)	John Newcombe / Tony Roche; Gondo Widjojo / Atet Wijono	6; 3	6; 2	6; 1
4	(Australia) (Indonesia)	John Newcombe; Atet Wijono	6; 2	6; 1	6; 1
5	(Australia) (Indonesia)	Tony Roche; Yustedjo Tarik	6; 3	6; 2	6; 2

New Zealand vs. India

New Zealand
3
Stanley Street, Auckland, New Zealand
16–18 January 1976
Grass

India
2

			1	2	3	4	5
1	(New Zealand) (India)	Brian Fairlie; Anand Amritraj	6; 2	6; 4	7; 5
2	(New Zealand) (India)	Onny Parun; Vijay Amritraj	6; 4	3; 6	6; 8	5; 7
3	(New Zealand) (India)	Brian Fairlie / Onny Parun; Anand Amritraj / Vijay Amritraj	6; 1	6; 1	15; 13
4	(New Zealand) (India)	Brian Fairlie; Vijay Amritraj	3; 6	8; 10	1; 6
5	(New Zealand) (India)	Onny Parun; Anand Amritraj	6; 2	9; 7	6; 4

=== Final ===
Australia vs. New Zealand

Australia
3
Milton Courts, Brisbane, Australia
27 February–1 March 1976
Grass

New Zealand
1

			1	2	3	4	5
1	(Australia) (New Zealand)	Ross Case; Brian Fairlie	6; 3	8; 10	1; 6	6; 2	4; 6
2	(Australia) (New Zealand)	John Newcombe; Onny Parun	8; 6	6; 3	7; 5
3	(Australia) (New Zealand)	John Newcombe / Tony Roche; Brian Fairlie / Onny Parun	6; 1	3; 6	6; 3	7; 5
4	(Australia) (New Zealand)	John Newcombe; Brian Fairlie	8; 6	5; 7	11; 9	6; 3
5	(Australia) (New Zealand)	Ross Case; Onny Parun						not played
