= 1978 Davis Cup Eastern Zone =

International tennis competition

The Eastern Zone was one of the three regional zones of the 1978 Davis Cup.

11 teams entered the Eastern Zone, with 7 teams competing in the preliminary round to join the previous year's semifinalists in the main draw. India and Indonesia received byes into the quarterfinals, while Australia and New Zealand received byes into the semifinals. The winner of the main draw went on to compete in the Inter-Zonal Zone against the winners of the Americas Zone and Europe Zone.

Australia defeated New Zealand in the final and progressed to the Inter-Zonal Zone.

== Preliminary rounds ==
=== Draw ===
First Round; 1–10 October 1977
Manila, Philippines
Philippines	5
Thailand	0
Tokyo, Japan
Japan	5
Chinese Taipei	0
Rawalpindi, Pakistan
Pakistan	4
Malaysia	0
bye
South Korea

Qualifying Round; 21–30 October 1977
Manila, Philippines
Philippines	1
Japan	4
Seoul, South Korea
Pakistan	2
South Korea	3

=== First round ===
Philippines vs. Thailand

Philippines
5
Manila, Philippines
7–10 October 1977

Thailand
0

			1	2	3	4	5
1	(Philippines) (Thailand)	Eduardo Cruz; Somparn Champisri	6; 2	6; 3	6; 3
2	(Philippines) (Thailand)	Romeo Rafon; Pichet Boratisa	6; 2	6; 2	6; 4
3	(Philippines) (Thailand)	Ody Gabriel / Alexander Marcial; Pichet Boratisa / Somparn Champisri	6; 3	6; 2	6; 2
4	(Philippines) (Thailand)	Romeo Rafon; Prasert Khaimarn	6; 0	6; 1	6; 2
5	(Philippines) (Thailand)	Ody Gabriel; Chana Techasen	6; 3	6; 0	8; 6

Japan vs. Chinese Taipei

Japan
5
Tokyo, Japan
October 1977

Chinese Taipei
0

			1	2	3	4	5
1	(Japan) (Chinese Taipei)	Kenichi Hirai; Hsu Huang-jung	6; 2	6; 0	6; 2
2	(Japan) (Chinese Taipei)	Tsuyoshi Fukui; Wu Chang-rung	6; 1	6; 3	6; 1
3	(Japan) (Chinese Taipei)	Kenichi Hirai / Shigeyuki Nishio; Hsu Huang-jung / Wu Chang-rung	6; 2	6; 3	6; 4
4	(Japan) (Chinese Taipei)	Takao Yamamoto; Lin Den-wen	6; 2	12; 10	6; 1
5	(Japan) (Chinese Taipei)	Shigeyuki Nishio; Hsu Huang-jung	6; 1	6; 1	6; 2

Pakistan vs. Malaysia

Pakistan
4
Rawalpindi, Pakistan
1–3 October 1977

Malaysia
0

			1	2	3	4	5
1	(Pakistan) (Malaysia)	Saeed Meer; Mohammed Akbar-Baba	6; 4	6; 2	6; 1
2	(Pakistan) (Malaysia)	Altaf Hussain; Albert Cheah	6; 1	6; 0	6; 3
3	(Pakistan) (Malaysia)	Saeed Meer / Meer Mohammed Khan; Mohammed Akbar-Baba / Chiew Fook-chong	6; 3	6; 2	6; 2
4	(Pakistan) (Malaysia)	Meer Mohammed Khan; Albert Cheah	6; 0	6; 0	6; 0
5	(Pakistan) (Malaysia)	Jamil Ahmed; Mohammed Akbar-Baba	11; 9	6; 2	6; 6			not completed

=== Qualifying round ===
Philippines vs. Japan

Philippines
1
Manila, Philippines
21–23 October 1977

Japan
4

			1	2	3	4	5
1	(Philippines) (Japan)	Alexander Marcial; Kenichi Hirai	4; 6	6; 3	4; 6	0; 6
2	(Philippines) (Japan)	Romeo Rafon; Tsuyoshi Fukui	3; 6	4; 6	6; 0	6; 3	6; 2
3	(Philippines) (Japan)	Ody Gabriel / Manuel Valleramos; Kenichi Hirai / Shigeyuki Nishio	7; 5	0; 6	2; 6	2; 6
4	(Philippines) (Japan)	Romeo Rafon; Kenichi Hirai	2; 6	2; 6	5; 7
5	(Philippines) (Japan)	Alexander Marcial; Takao Yamamoto	5; 7	4; 6	3; 6

South Korea vs. Pakistan

South Korea
3
Seoul, South Korea
28–30 October 1977

Pakistan
2

			1	2	3	4	5
1	(South Korea) (Pakistan)	Kim Moon-il; Saeed Meer	6; 4	6; 8	4; 6	6; 4	5; 7
2	(South Korea) (Pakistan)	Ju Chang-nam; Meer Mohammed Khan	6; 2	6; 2	6; 2
3	(South Korea) (Pakistan)	Ju Chang-nam / Kim Moon-il; Munawar Iqbal / Saeed Meer	6; 3	6; 4	4; 6	7; 5
4	(South Korea) (Pakistan)	Kim Moon-il; Meer Mohammed Khan	6; 2	6; 2	6; 2
5	(South Korea) (Pakistan)	Ju Chang-nam; Saeed Meer	2; 6	2; 6	0; 6

== Main draw ==
=== Draw ===
Quarterfinals; 9–12 December 1977
Australia
bye
Tokyo, Japan
Indonesia	1
Japan	4
Coimbatore, India
South Korea	1
India	4
bye
New Zealand

Semifinals; 19–22 January
Tokyo, Japan (clay)
Australia	5
Japan	0
New Delhi, India
India	1
New Zealand	4

Final; 24–26 February
Adelaide, Australia (grass)
Australia	4
New Zealand	0

=== Quarterfinals ===
Japan vs. Indonesia

Japan
4
Tokyo, Japan
9–11 December 1977

Indonesia
1

			1	2	3	4	5
1	(Japan) (Indonesia)	Tsuyoshi Fukui; Atet Wijono	6; 0	6; 2	6; 4
2	(Japan) (Indonesia)	Kenichi Hirai; Gondo Widjojo	8; 6	6; 2	7; 5
3	(Japan) (Indonesia)	Kenichi Hirai / Shigeyuki Nishio; Gondo Widjojo / Atet Wijono	6; 2	1; 6	6; 3	4; 6	2; 6
4	(Japan) (Indonesia)	Tsuyoshi Fukui; Gondo Widjojo	6; 4	6; 1	6; 3
5	(Japan) (Indonesia)	Takao Yamamoto; Yustedjo Tarik	8; 6	6; 3	7; 9	3; 6	6; 3

India vs. South Korea

India
4
Coimbatore, India
9–12 December 1977

South Korea
1

			1	2	3	4	5
1	(India) (South Korea)	Sashi Menon; Kim Moon-il	6; 4	8; 6	6; 2
2	(India) (South Korea)	Anand Amritraj; Ju Chang-nam	6; 3	6; 1	6; 2
3	(India) (South Korea)	Anand Amritraj / Vijay Amritraj; Ju Chang-nam / Kim Bong-suk	6; 1	6; 3	8; 6
4	(India) (South Korea)	Sashi Menon; Choi Boo-kil	6; 3	6; 2	1; 6			retired
5	(India) (South Korea)	Ramesh Krishnan; Kim Moon-il	6; 2	6; 1	6; 2

=== Semifinals ===
Japan vs. Australia

Japan
0
Denen Coliseum, Tokyo, Japan
20–22 January 1978
Clay

Australia
5

			1	2	3	4	5
1	(Japan) (Australia)	Jun Kuki; Geoff Masters	1; 6	3; 6	2; 6
2	(Japan) (Australia)	Kenichi Hirai; Phil Dent	2; 6	8; 10	0; 6
3	(Japan) (Australia)	Kenichi Hirai / Jun Kamiwazumi; Geoff Masters / Allan Stone	4; 6	4; 6	1; 6
4	(Japan) (Australia)	Jun Kuki; Kim Warwick	6; 2	7; 5	3; 6	3; 6	1; 6
5	(Japan) (Australia)	Tsuyoshi Fukui; Allan Stone	3; 6	5; 7	6; 3	6; 2	2; 6

India vs. New Zealand

India
1
New Delhi, India
19–21 January 1978

New Zealand
4

			1	2	3	4	5
1	(India) (New Zealand)	Sashi Menon; Chris Lewis	4; 6	3; 6	5; 7
2	(India) (New Zealand)	Anand Amritraj; Onny Parun	4; 6	6; 3	7; 9	3; 6
3	(India) (New Zealand)	Anand Amritraj / Sashi Menon; Brian Fairlie / Chris Lewis	6; 2	16; 14	10; 12	2; 6	2; 6
4	(India) (New Zealand)	Sashi Menon; Onny Parun	6; 3	6; 4	6; 2
5	(India) (New Zealand)	Ramesh Krishnan; Russell Simpson	6; 4	4; 6	2; 6	4; 6

=== Final ===
Australia vs. New Zealand

Australia
4
Memorial Drive, Adelaide, Australia
24–26 February 1978
Grass

New Zealand
0

			1	2	3	4	5
1	(Australia) (New Zealand)	Tony Roche; Chris Lewis	13; 11	6; 3	6; 2
2	(Australia) (New Zealand)	John Alexander; Brian Fairlie	6; 4	6; 4	6; 4
3	(Australia) (New Zealand)	John Alexander / Tony Roche; Brian Fairlie / Chris Lewis	6; 3	6; 4	12; 14	4; 6	6; 1
4	(Australia) (New Zealand)	John Alexander; Chris Lewis	8; 10	16; 14	6; 1	9; 7
5	(Australia) (New Zealand)	Allan Stone; Brian Fairlie	2; 6	6; 1				not completed
