= 1971 Davis Cup Eastern Zone =

International tennis competition

The Eastern Zone was one of the three regional zones of the 1971 Davis Cup.

9 teams entered the Eastern Zone, competing across 2 sub-zones. The winner of each sub-zones would play against each other to determine who would compete in the Inter-Zonal Zone against the winners of the Americas Zone and Europe Zone.

Japan defeated Australia in the Zone A final, and India received a walkover in the Zone B final after Pakistan withdrew. In the Inter-Zonal final India defeated Japan and progressed to the Inter-Zonal Zone.

== Zone A ==
=== Draw ===
Quarterfinals; 27–29 March
Hong Kong
Australia	5
Hong Kong	0
Indonesia
bye
bye
Philippines
bye
Japan

Semifinals; 2–5 April
Jakarta, Indonesia
Australia	3
Indonesia	2
Manila, Philippines
Philippines	1
Japan	4

Final; 23–25 April
Tokyo, Japan
Australia	2
Japan	3

=== Quarterfinals ===
Hong Kong vs. Australia

Hong Kong
0
Hong Kong
27–29 March 1971

Australia
5

			1	2	3	4	5
1	(Hong Kong) (Australia)	Louis Hsu; Colin Dibley	1; 6	2; 6	2; 6
2	(Hong Kong) (Australia)	Kenneth Tsui; John Cooper	2; 6	4; 6	2; 6
3	(Hong Kong) (Australia)	Ling Fong / Kenneth Tsui; Colin Dibley / Bob Giltinan	2; 6	3; 6	4; 6
4	(Hong Kong) (Australia)	Louis Hsu; John Cooper	3; 6	1; 6	0; 6
5	(Hong Kong) (Australia)	Charles Chang; Colin Dibley	2; 6	2; 6	1; 6

=== Semifinals ===
Indonesia vs. Australia

Indonesia
2
Jakarta, Indonesia
3–5 April 1971

Australia
3

			1	2	3	4	5
1	(Indonesia) (Australia)	Atet Wijono; Ross Case	2; 6	6; 2	6; 4	3; 6	3; 6
2	(Indonesia) (Australia)	Gondo Widjojo; Bob Giltinan	6; 8	4; 6	6; 0	4; 6
3	(Indonesia) (Australia)	Budiman Aznar / Jacky Wulur; John Cooper / Colin Dibley	2; 6	0; 6	1; 6
4	(Indonesia) (Australia)	Atet Wijono; John Cooper	6; 4	6; 4	10; 8
5	(Indonesia) (Australia)	Gondo Widjojo; Colin Dibley	6; 1	4; 6	7; 5	6; 1

Philippines vs. Japan

Philippines
1
Manila, Philippines
2–4 April 1971

Japan
4

			1	2	3	4	5
1	(Philippines) (Japan)	Raymundo Deyro; Jun Kuki	1; 6	4; 6	2; 6
2	(Philippines) (Japan)	Eduardo Cruz; Toshiro Sakai	7; 5	6; 1	5; 7	8; 6
3	(Philippines) (Japan)	Eduardo Cruz / Raymundo Deyro; Junzo Kawamori / Takeshi Koura	2; 6	6; 8	6; 3	6; 8
4	(Philippines) (Japan)	Eduardo Cruz; Jun Kuki	0; 6	6; 3	2; 6	1; 6
5	(Philippines) (Japan)	Raymundo Deyro; Toshiro Sakai	4; 6	2; 6	3; 6

=== Final ===
Japan vs. Australia

Japan
3
Tokyo, Japan
23–25 April 1971

Australia
2

			1	2	3	4	5
1	(Japan) (Australia)	Keishiro Yanagi; John Cooper	6; 3	6; 4	2; 6	1; 6	6; 3
2	(Japan) (Australia)	Toshiro Sakai; Colin Dibley	5; 7	8; 6	6; 3	6; 2
3	(Japan) (Australia)	Junzo Kawamori / Takeshi Koura; Colin Dibley / Bob Giltinan	1; 6	6; 3	9; 11	1; 6
4	(Japan) (Australia)	Keishiro Yanagi; Colin Dibley	3; 6	4; 6	7; 5	6; 3	6; 8
5	(Japan) (Australia)	Toshiro Sakai; John Cooper	6; 1	15; 13	8; 6

== Zone B ==
=== Draw ===
Semifinals; 30 March–4 April
Colombo, Ceylon (clay)
India	4
Ceylon	0
Lahore, Pakistan
Malaysia	0
Pakistan	5

Final
India	w/o
Pakistan

=== Semifinals ===
Ceylon vs. India

Ceylon
0
Ceylon Lawn Tennis Association, Colombo, Ceylon
2–4 April 1971
Clay

India
4

			1	2	3	4	5
1	(Dominion of Ceylon) (India)	Senaka Kumara; Gaurav Misra	2; 6	11; 13	2; 6
2	(Dominion of Ceylon) (India)	Bernard Pinto; Jaidip Mukerjea	5; 7	6; 8	5; 7
3	(Dominion of Ceylon) (India)	Bernard Pinto / Ranjan Wattegedera; Premjit Lall / Jaidip Mukerjea	2; 6	3; 6	4; 6
4	(Dominion of Ceylon) (India)	Ranjan Wattegedera; Gaurav Misra	6; 4	3; 6	2; 6	2; 6
5	(Dominion of Ceylon) (India)	Neville Senaratne; Anand Amritraj	2; 6	1; 6				not completed

Pakistan vs. Malaysia

Pakistan
5
Lahore, Pakistan
30 March–1 April 1971

Malaysia
0

			1	2	3	4	5
1	(Pakistan) (Malaysia)	Haroon Rahim; Sultan-Aman Azman	6; 2	6; 2	6; 2
2	(Pakistan) (Malaysia)	Munawar Iqbal; Song-Kean Tan	6; 3	6; 3	6; 1
3	(Pakistan) (Malaysia)	Munawar Iqbal / Haroon Rahim; Sultan-Aman Azman / Song-Kean Tan	6; 2	6; 1	6; 3
4	(Pakistan) (Malaysia)	Meer Mohammed Khan; Song-Kean Tan	7; 5	7; 5	7; 5
5	(Pakistan) (Malaysia)	Munawar Iqbal; Sultan-Aman Azman	6; 1	6; 3	6; 0

=== Final ===
India defeated Pakistan by walkover.

== Eastern Inter-Zonal Final ==
Japan vs. India

Japan
2
Denen Coliseum, Tokyo, Japan
15–17 May 1971
Clay

India
3

			1	2	3	4	5
1	(Japan) (India)	Toshiro Sakai; Jaidip Mukerjea	0; 6	0; 6	4; 6
2	(Japan) (India)	Keishiro Yanagi; Premjit Lall	3; 6	6; 3	6; 1	6; 2
3	(Japan) (India)	Jun Kamiwazumi / Toshiro Sakai; Premjit Lall / Jaidip Mukerjea	9; 7	1; 6	6; 3	1; 6	6; 8
4	(Japan) (India)	Toshiro Sakai; Premjit Lall	2; 6	2; 6	4; 6
5	(Japan) (India)	Keishiro Yanagi; Jaidip Mukerjea	6; 4	6; 3	6; 0
