= 1972 Davis Cup Eastern Zone =

International tennis competition

The Eastern Zone was one of the three regional zones of the 1972 Davis Cup.

11 teams entered the Eastern Zone, competing across 2 sub-zones. The winner of each sub-zones would play against each other to determine who would compete in the Inter-Zonal Zone against the winners of the Americas Zone and Europe Zone.

Australia defeated Japan in the Zone A final, and India defeated Malaysia in the Zone B final. In the Eastern Inter-Zonal final, Australia defeated India and progressed to the Inter-Zonal Zone.

== Zone A ==
=== Draw ===
Quarterfinals; 24–26 March
Australia
bye
South Korea	w/o
Philippines
Saigon, South Vietnam
South Vietnam	5
Chinese Taipei	0
Hong Kong
Hong Kong	0
Japan	5

Semifinals; 8–16 April
Seoul, South Korea
Australia	5
South Korea	0
Saigon, South Vietnam
South Vietnam	2
Japan	3

Final; 28–30 April
Tokyo, Japan
Australia	4
Japan	1

=== Quarterfinals ===
South Vietnam vs. Chinese Taipei

South Vietnam
5
Saigon, South Vietnam
24–26 March 1972

Chinese Taipei
0

			1	2	3	4	5
1	(South Vietnam) (Chinese Taipei)	Võ Văn Bảy; Lin Chi-yuan	6; 0	6; 0	6; 0
2	(South Vietnam) (Chinese Taipei)	Võ Văn Thành; Tang Fu-shun	6; 3	6; 2	6; 3
3	(South Vietnam) (Chinese Taipei)	Võ Văn Bảy / Võ Văn Thành; Lee Shui-chang / Tang Fu-shun	6; 2	6; 1	6; 0
4	(South Vietnam) (Chinese Taipei)	Lý Alline An; Lin Chi-yuan	6; 3	6; 2	6; 1
5	(South Vietnam) (Chinese Taipei)	Võ Văn Bảy; Tang Fu-shun	6; 2	6; 0	6; 0

Hong Kong vs. Japan

Hong Kong
0
Hong Kong
24–26 March 1972

Japan
5

			1	2	3	4	5
1	(Hong Kong) (Japan)	Ling Fong; Jun Kamiwazumi	2; 6	4; 6	2; 6
2	(Hong Kong) (Japan)	Charles Chang; Jun Kuki	0; 6	0; 6	3; 6
3	(Hong Kong) (Japan)	Louis Hsu / Kenneth Tsui; Jun Kamiwazumi / Toshiro Sakai	4; 6	4; 6	4; 6
4	(Hong Kong) (Japan)	Ling Fong; Jun Kuki	0; 6	1; 6	2; 6
5	(Hong Kong) (Japan)	Charles Chang; Jun Kamiwazumi	2; 6	3; 6	0; 6

=== Semifinals ===
South Korea vs. Australia

South Korea
0
Seoul, South Korea
14–16 April 1972

Australia
5

			1	2	3	4	5
1	(South Korea) (Australia)	Kim Sung-bae; Colin Dibley	1; 6	6; 4	4; 6	3; 6
2	(South Korea) (Australia)	Chung Yong-ho; Mal Anderson	6; 4	0; 6	2; 6	5; 7
3	(South Korea) (Australia)	Chung Yong-ho / Kim Moon-il; Mal Anderson / Geoff Masters	5; 7	2; 6	2; 6
4	(South Korea) (Australia)	Chung Yong-ho; Colin Dibley	5; 7	8; 10	1; 6
5	(South Korea) (Australia)	Kim Sung-bae; Mal Anderson	2; 6	2; 6	2; 6

South Vietnam vs. Japan

South Vietnam
2
Saigon, South Vietnam
8–10 April 1972

Japan
3

			1	2	3	4	5
1	(South Vietnam) (Japan)	Võ Văn Bảy; Toshiro Sakai	11; 13	6; 4	6; 2	6; 3
2	(South Vietnam) (Japan)	Võ Văn Thành; Jun Kamiwazumi	6; 8	3; 6	1; 6
3	(South Vietnam) (Japan)	Võ Văn Bảy / Võ Văn Thành; Jun Kamiwazumi / Toshiro Sakai	6; 4	6; 4	3; 6	10; 12	3; 1	retired
4	(South Vietnam) (Japan)	Dương Văn Minh; Toshiro Sakai	1; 6	0; 6	1; 6
5	(South Vietnam) (Japan)	Võ Văn Bảy; Jun Kamiwazumi	6; 3	8; 6	3; 6	6; 4

=== Final ===
Japan vs. Australia

Japan
1
Tokyo, Japan
28–30 April 1972

Australia
4

			1	2	3	4	5
1	(Japan) (Australia)	Toshiro Sakai; Mal Anderson	3; 6	3; 6	3; 6
2	(Japan) (Australia)	Jun Kuki; Colin Dibley	4; 6	6; 3	6; 3	1; 6	3; 6
3	(Japan) (Australia)	Jun Kamiwazumi / Toshiro Sakai; Mal Anderson / Geoff Masters	6; 3	9; 7	1; 6	6; 3
4	(Japan) (Australia)	Jun Kuki; Mal Anderson	2; 6	3; 6	2; 6
5	(Japan) (Australia)	Toshiro Sakai; Colin Dibley	6; 4	4; 6	6; 4	5; 7	3; 6

== Zone B ==
=== Draw ===
Semifinals; 1–3 April
Lucknow, India
India	5
Ceylon	0
Malaysia	w/o
Pakistan

Final; 28–30 April
Kuala Lumpur, Malaysia
India	5
Malaysia	0

=== Semifinals ===
India vs. Ceylon

India
5
Lucknow, India
1–3 April 1972

Ceylon
0

			1	2	3	4	5
1	(India) (Dominion of Ceylon)	Jaidip Mukerjea; Senaka Kumara	6; 3	6; 4	6; 4
2	(India) (Dominion of Ceylon)	Premjit Lall; Ranjan Wattegedera	6; 1	6; 1	6; 1
3	(India) (Dominion of Ceylon)	Premjit Lall / Jaidip Mukerjea; Senaka Kumara / Ranjan Wattegedera	6; 3	6; 2	6; 3
4	(India) (Dominion of Ceylon)	Jaidip Mukerjea; Ranjan Wattegedera	6; 2	6; 1	6; 2
5	(India) (Dominion of Ceylon)	Premjit Lall; Senaka Kumara	6; 4	6; 2	6; 2

=== Final ===
Malaysia vs. India

Malaysia
0
Kuala Lumpur, Malaysia
28–30 April 1972

India
5

			1	2	3	4	5
1	(Malaysia) (India)	Sultan-Aman Azman; Jaidip Mukerjea	2; 6	0; 6	6; 8
2	(Malaysia) (India)	Song-Kean Tan; Premjit Lall	1; 6	2; 6	0; 6
3	(Malaysia) (India)	Sultan-Aman Azman / Song-Kean Tan; Premjit Lall / Jaidip Mukerjea	3; 6	4; 6	4; 6
4	(Malaysia) (India)	Sultan-Aman Azman; Premjit Lall	0; 6	3; 6	4; 6
5	(Malaysia) (India)	Song-Kean Tan; Jaidip Mukerjea	0; 6	4; 6	0; 6

== Eastern Inter-Zonal Final ==
India vs. Australia

India
0
Bangalore, India
16–18 May 1972

Australia
5

			1	2	3	4	5
1	(India) (Australia)	Vijay Amritraj; Mal Anderson	4; 6	4; 6	2; 6
2	(India) (Australia)	Jaidip Mukerjea; Geoff Masters	3; 6	3; 6	6; 3	6; 1	3; 6
3	(India) (Australia)	Premjit Lall / Jaidip Mukerjea; Colin Dibley / Geoff Masters	2; 6	4; 6	6; 3	3; 6
4	(India) (Australia)	Anand Amritraj; Ross Case	1; 6	6; 8	5; 7
5	(India) (Australia)	Vijay Amritraj; Colin Dibley	5; 7	6; 4	3; 6	2; 6
