= Australia Davis Cup team results (2010–present) =

This is a list of the Australia Davis Cup team results from 2010 to present. It does not include ties that were not completed, for example when a walkover occurred. In total they have played 50 Davis Cup ties.

In this period, Australia were finalists on two occasions (2022 and 2023), semifinalists on two occasions (2015 and 2017), and quarterfinalists once (2019)

Australia were outside the World Group for the first four years of the decade but returned there for the final five years before the introduction of the Davis Cup Finals format. They were a part of all five editions of this top tier event.

== 2010s ==
=== 2010 ===
Asia/Oceania Group I
First round

Australia
5
Margaret Court Arena, Melbourne, Australia
5–7 March 2010
Hard

Chinese Taipei
0

			1	2	3	4	5
1	(Australia) (Chinese Taipei)	Bernard Tomic; Yang Tsung-hua	6; 2	6; 1	6; 1
2	(Australia) (Chinese Taipei)	Peter Luczak; Yi Chu-huan	4; 6	6; 3	6; 2	6; 3
3	(Australia) (Chinese Taipei)	Carsten Ball / Paul Hanley; Yang Tsung-hua / Yi Chu-huan	7^{7} 6^{4}	7^{7} 6^{2}	6; 2
4	(Australia) (Chinese Taipei)	Peter Luczak; Yang Tsung-hua	6; 3	6; 3
5	(Australia) (Chinese Taipei)	Bernard Tomic; Lee Hsin-Han	6^{4} 7^{7}	6; 0	6; 3

Asia/Oceania Group I
Second round

Australia
5
Queensland Tennis Centre, Brisbane, Australia
7–9 May 2010
Clay

Japan
0

			1	2	3	4	5
1	(Australia) (Japan)	Lleyton Hewitt; Tatsuma Ito	6; 3	6; 3	6; 2
2	(Australia) (Japan)	Carsten Ball; Yuichi Sugita	6; 3	6; 4	6; 4
3	(Australia) (Japan)	Paul Hanley / Lleyton Hewitt; Takao Suzuki / Go Soeda	7; 5	6; 4	6; 0
4	(Australia) (Japan)	Lleyton Hewitt; Yuichi Sugita	7; 5	6; 2
5	(Australia) (Japan)	Carsten Ball; Tatsuma Ito	6; 3	7^{8} 6^{6}

World Group Play-offs

Australia
2
Cairns Regional Tennis Centre, North Cairns, Australia
17–20 September 2010
Hard

Belgium
3

			1	2	3	4	5
1	(Australia) (Belgium)	Lleyton Hewitt; Ruben Bemelmans	7^{7} 6^{4}	7; 5	2; 6	6; 4
2	(Australia) (Belgium)	Carsten Ball; Olivier Rochus	4; 6	4; 6	6^{5} 7^{7}
3	(Australia) (Belgium)	Paul Hanley / Lleyton Hewitt; Ruben Bemelmans / Olivier Rochus	6; 1	6; 2	6; 4
4	(Australia) (Belgium)	Peter Luczak; Olivier Rochus	6^{8} 7^{10}	4; 6	7^{7} 6^{0}	6^{2} 7^{7}
5	(Australia) (Belgium)	Carsten Ball; Steve Darcis	6^{4} 7^{7}	3; 6	4; 6

- Rain stopped play on the third day: only 51 minutes of play were held in rubber 4 in which Peter Luczak and Olivier Rochus won 4 games each in the first set. The remainder of Rubber 4 and Rubber 5 continued on 20 September 2010.

=== 2011 ===
Asia/Oceania Group I
Second round

China
1
Beijing International Tennis Center, Beijing, China
8–10 July 2011
Hard (indoor)

Australia
3

			1	2	3	4	5
1	(China) (Australia)	Wu Di; Marinko Matosevic	4; 6	6; 3	3; 6	6; 4	6; 4
2	(China) (Australia)	Zhang Ze; Bernard Tomic	3; 6	7; 5	4; 6	4; 6
3	(China) (Australia)	Gong Maoxin / Li Zhe; Chris Guccione / Lleyton Hewitt	4; 6	4; 6	4; 6
4	(China) (Australia)	Zhang Ze; Lleyton Hewitt	2; 6	1; 6	6; 4	6^{2} 7^{7}
5	(China) (Australia)	Wu Di; Bernard Tomic						not played

World Group Play-offs

Australia
2
Royal Sydney Golf Club, Sydney, Australia
16–19 September 2011
Grass

Switzerland
3

			1	2	3	4	5
1	(Australia) (Switzerland)	Bernard Tomic; Stanislas Wawrinka	4; 6	6; 4	6; 3	6; 3
2	(Australia) (Switzerland)	Lleyton Hewitt; Roger Federer	7; 5	6^{5} 7^{7}	2; 6	3; 6
3	(Australia) (Switzerland)	Lleyton Hewitt / Chris Guccione; Roger Federer / Stanislas Wawrinka	2; 6	6; 4	6; 2	7^{7} 6^{5}
4	(Australia) (Switzerland)	Bernard Tomic; Roger Federer	2; 6	5; 7	6; 3	3; 6
5	(Australia) (Switzerland)	Lleyton Hewitt; Stanislas Wawrinka	6; 4	4; 6	7^{9} 6^{7}	4; 6	3; 6

=== 2012 ===
Asia/Oceania Group I
First round

Australia
5
Geelong Lawn Tennis Club, Geelong, Australia
10–12 February 2012
Grass

China
0

			1	2	3	4	5
1	(Australia) (China)	Lleyton Hewitt; Zhang Ze	6; 2	6; 1	7^{7} 6^{4}
2	(Australia) (China)	Bernard Tomic; Wu Di	6; 4	7^{7} 6^{3}	6; 3
3	(Australia) (China)	Chris Guccione / Lleyton Hewitt; Li Zhe / Zhang Ze	6; 2	6; 2	6; 2
4	(Australia) (China)	Matthew Ebden; Ma Yanan	6; 2	6; 2
5	(Australia) (China)	Chris Guccione; Wu Di	6; 2	6; 4

Asia/Oceania Group I
Second round

Australia
5
Queensland Tennis Centre, Brisbane, Australia
6–8 April 2012
Hard

South Korea
0

			1	2	3	4	5
1	(Australia) (South Korea)	Bernard Tomic; Cho Min Hyeok	7; 5	6; 3	6; 3
2	(Australia) (South Korea)	Matthew Ebden; Jeong Suk-young	6; 3	6; 3	6; 4
3	(Australia) (South Korea)	Chris Guccione / Marinko Matosevic; Jeong Suk-young / Seol Jae-Min	4; 6	6; 1	6; 4	6; 2
4	(Australia) (South Korea)	Bernard Tomic; Na Jung-woong	6; 2	6; 1
5	(Australia) (South Korea)	Matthew Ebden; Cho Min Hyeok	6; 2	2; 6	6; 0

World Group Play-offs

Germany
3
Rothenbaum Stadium, Hamburg, Germany
14–16 September 2012
Clay

Australia
2

			1	2	3	4	5
1	(Germany) (Australia)	Cedrik-Marcel Stebe; Bernard Tomic	6; 2	3; 6	4; 6	6^{4} 7^{7}
2	(Germany) (Australia)	Florian Mayer; Lleyton Hewitt	7; 5	6; 3	6; 2
3	(Germany) (Australia)	Benjamin Becker / Philipp Petzschner; Chris Guccione / Lleyton Hewitt	3; 6	2; 6	6; 2	6^{4} 7^{7}
4	(Germany) (Australia)	Florian Mayer; Bernard Tomic	6; 4	6; 2	6; 3
5	(Germany) (Australia)	Cedrik-Marcel Stebe; Lleyton Hewitt	6; 4	6; 1	6; 4

=== 2013 ===
Asia/Oceania Group I
First round

Chinese Taipei
0
Kaohsiung Yangming Tennis Courts, Kaohsiung City, Chinese Taipei
1–3 February 2013
Hard

Australia
5

			1	2	3	4	5
1	(Chinese Taipei) (Australia)	Yang Tsung-Hua; Lleyton Hewitt	4; 6	4; 6	4; 6
2	(Chinese Taipei) (Australia)	Chen Ti; Matthew Ebden	3; 6	4; 6	5; 7
3	(Chinese Taipei) (Australia)	Lee Hsin-Han / Peng Hsien-Yin; Chris Guccione / Lleyton Hewitt	6^{6} 7^{8}	4; 6	2; 6
4	(Chinese Taipei) (Australia)	Chen Ti; Marinko Matosevic	6^{5} 7^{7}	3; 6
5	(Chinese Taipei) (Australia)	Yang Tsung-Hua; Matthew Ebden	1; 6	2; 6

Asia/Oceania Group I
Second round

Uzbekistan
1
Sport Complex Pahlavon, Namangan, Uzbekistan
5–7 April 2013
Clay (indoor)

Australia
3

			1	2	3	4	5
1	(Uzbekistan) (Australia)	Farrukh Dustov; Bernard Tomic	6^{6} 7^{8}	4; 6	4; 6
2	(Uzbekistan) (Australia)	Denis Istomin; Marinko Matosevic	6; 4	7; 6	3; 6	6; 4
3	(Uzbekistan) (Australia)	Farrukh Dustov / Denis Istomin; Matthew Ebden / Lleyton Hewitt	5; 7	7^{7} 6^{4}	4; 6	6; 3	3; 6
4	(Uzbekistan) (Australia)	Denis Istomin; Bernard Tomic	6; 4	2; 6	2; 6	3; 6
5	(Uzbekistan) (Australia)	Farrukh Dustov; Marinko Matosevic						not played

World Group Play-offs

Poland
1
Torwar Hall, Warsaw, Poland
13–15 September 2013
Clay (indoor)

Australia
4

			1	2	3	4	5
1	(Poland) (Australia)	Łukasz Kubot; Lleyton Hewitt	1; 6	3; 6	2; 6
2	(Poland) (Australia)	Michał Przysiężny; Bernard Tomic	5; 7	6^{1} 7^{7}	4; 6
3	(Poland) (Australia)	Mariusz Fyrstenberg / Marcin Matkowski; Chris Guccione / Nick Kyrgios	5; 7	6; 4	6; 2	6^{5} 7^{7}	6; 4
4	(Poland) (Australia)	Łukasz Kubot; Bernard Tomic	4; 6	6^{5} 7^{7}	3; 6
5	(Poland) (Australia)	Michał Przysiężny; Nick Kyrgios	1; 4					retired

=== 2014 ===
World Group First round

France
5
Vendéspace, La Roche sur Yon, France
31 January – 2 February 2014
Clay (indoor)

Australia
0

			1	2	3	4	5
1	(France) (Australia)	Richard Gasquet; Nick Kyrgios	7^{7} 6^{3}	6; 2	6; 2
2	(France) (Australia)	Jo-Wilfried Tsonga; Lleyton Hewitt	6; 3	6; 2	7^{7} 6^{2}
3	(France) (Australia)	Richard Gasquet / Jo-Wilfried Tsonga; Chris Guccione / Lleyton Hewitt	5; 7	7^{7} 6^{3}	6; 2	7; 5
4	(France) (Australia)	Julien Benneteau; Thanasi Kokkinakis	6; 4	6; 1
5	(France) (Australia)	Gaël Monfils; Nick Kyrgios	7^{7} 6^{5}	6; 4

World Group Play-offs

Australia
5
Cottesloe Tennis Club, Perth, Australia
12 – 14 September 2014
Grass

Uzbekistan
0

			1	2	3	4	5
1	(Australia) (Uzbekistan)	Nick Kyrgios; Denis Istomin	6; 4	7; 5	6; 4
2	(Australia) (Uzbekistan)	Lleyton Hewitt; Farrukh Dustov	6; 4	6; 4	6; 2
3	(Australia) (Uzbekistan)	Chris Guccione / Lleyton Hewitt; Farrukh Dustov / Denis Istomin	6; 3	7^{7} 6^{5}	6; 2
4	(Australia) (Uzbekistan)	Samuel Groth; Temur Ismailov	6; 3	6; 2
5	(Australia) (Uzbekistan)	Nick Kyrgios; Sanjar Fayziev	6; 1	6; 1

=== 2015 ===
World Group First round

Czech Republic
2
ČEZ Aréna, Ostrava, Czech Republic
6–8 March 2015
Hard (indoor)

Australia
3

			1	2	3	4	5
1	(Czech Republic) (Australia)	Lukáš Rosol; Thanasi Kokkinakis	6; 4	6; 2	5; 7	5; 7	3; 6
2	(Czech Republic) (Australia)	Jiří Veselý; Bernard Tomic	4; 6	3; 6	6^{5} 7^{7}
3	(Czech Republic) (Australia)	Jiří Veselý / Adam Pavlásek; Sam Groth / Lleyton Hewitt	1; 6	7^{7} 6^{2}	3; 6	7^{7} 6^{4}	6; 2
4	(Czech Republic) (Australia)	Lukáš Rosol; Bernard Tomic	6^{4} 7^{7}	3; 6	6^{5} 7^{7}
5	(Czech Republic) (Australia)	Jan Mertl; Sam Groth	6; 3	6; 2

- This was Australia's first World Group win since 2006.

World Group Quarterfinals

Australia
3
Marrara Sporting Complex, Darwin, Australia
17–19 July 2015
Grass

Kazakhstan
2

			1	2	3	4	5
1	(Australia) (Kazakhstan)	Thanasi Kokkinakis; Mikhail Kukushkin	4; 6	3; 6	3; 6
2	(Australia) (Kazakhstan)	Nick Kyrgios; Aleksandr Nedovyesov	6^{5} 7^{7}	7^{7} 6^{2}	6^{5} 7^{7}	4; 6
3	(Australia) (Kazakhstan)	Sam Groth / Lleyton Hewitt; Andrey Golubev / Aleksandr Nedovyesov	6; 4	7^{7} 6^{4}	6; 2
4	(Australia) (Kazakhstan)	Sam Groth; Mikhail Kukushkin	6; 3	7^{8} 6^{6}	4; 6	7^{8} 6^{6}
5	(Australia) (Kazakhstan)	Lleyton Hewitt; Aleksandr Nedovyesov	7^{7} 6^{2}	6; 2	6; 3

- Notes:
  1. It was the first time in 76 years that Australia had come back from 2–0 down to win.
  2. It was the first time that all four nominated players had played in a singles live rubber tie for Australia.
  3. Australia made it into the semifinals for the first time since 2006.
  4. Despite having played Davis Cup for 17 years it was the first time that Hewitt had played in the deciding rubber.

World Group Semifinals

Great Britain
3
Commonwealth Arena, Glasgow, Great Britain
18–20 September 2015
Hard (indoor)

Australia
2

			1	2	3	4	5
1	(United Kingdom) (Australia)	Andy Murray; Thanasi Kokkinakis	6; 3	6; 0	6; 3
2	(United Kingdom) (Australia)	Dan Evans; Bernard Tomic	3; 6	6^{2} 7^{7}	7^{7} 6^{4}	4; 6
3	(United Kingdom) (Australia)	Andy Murray / Jamie Murray; Sam Groth / Lleyton Hewitt	4; 6	6; 3	6; 4	6^{6} 7^{8}	6; 4
4	(United Kingdom) (Australia)	Andy Murray; Bernard Tomic	7; 5	6; 3	6; 2
5	(United Kingdom) (Australia)	Dan Evans; Thanasi Kokkinakis	5; 7	4; 6

- Great Britain reach their first final since 1978.

=== 2016 ===
World Group First round

Australia
1
Kooyong Stadium, Melbourne, Australia
4–6 March 2016
Grass

United States
3

			1	2	3	4	5
1	(Australia) (United States)	Sam Groth; John Isner	6^{2} 7^{7}	2; 6	2; 6
2	(Australia) (United States)	Bernard Tomic; Jack Sock	7^{7} 6^{2}	6; 3	3; 6	6; 4
3	(Australia) (United States)	Lleyton Hewitt / John Peers; Bob Bryan / Mike Bryan	3; 6	3; 6	6; 4	6; 4	3; 6
4	(Australia) (United States)	Bernard Tomic; John Isner	4; 6	4; 6	7; 5	6^{4} 7^{7}
5	(Australia) (United States)	Sam Groth; Jack Sock						not played

World Group Play-offs

Australia
3
Ken Rosewall Arena, Sydney, Australia
16 – 18 September
Grass

Slovakia
0

			1	2	3	4	5
1	(Australia) (Slovakia)	Nick Kyrgios; Andrej Martin	6; 3	6; 2	6; 4
2	(Australia) (Slovakia)	Bernard Tomic; Jozef Kovalík	7^{7} 6^{5}	6; 4	6; 4
3	(Australia) (Slovakia)	Sam Groth / John Peers; Andrej Martin / Igor Zelenay	6; 4	6; 2	6^{3} 7^{7}	7^{7} 6^{2}
4	(Australia) (Slovakia)	Sam Groth; Jozef Kovalík						not played
5	(Australia) (Slovakia)	Bernard Tomic; Andrej Martin						not played

=== 2017 ===
World Group First round

Australia
4
Kooyong Stadium, Kooyong, Australia
3–5 February
Hard

Czech Republic
1

			1	2	3	4	5
1	(Australia) (Czech Republic)	Jordan Thompson; Jiří Veselý	6; 3	6; 3	6; 4
2	(Australia) (Czech Republic)	Nick Kyrgios; Jan Šátral	6; 2	6; 3	6; 2
3	(Australia) (Czech Republic)	Sam Groth / John Peers; Jan Šátral / Jiří Veselý	6; 3	6; 2	6; 2
4	(Australia) (Czech Republic)	Sam Groth; Jiří Veselý	6; 3	5; 7	3; 6
5	(Australia) (Czech Republic)	Jordan Thompson; Jan Šátral	7^{7} 6^{5}	6; 2

World Group Quarterfinals

Australia
3
Pat Rafter Arena, Brisbane, Australia
7–9 April 2017
Hard

United States
2

			1	2	3	4	5
1	(Australia) (United States)	Jordan Thompson; Jack Sock	6; 3	3; 6	7^{7} 6^{4}	6; 4
2	(Australia) (United States)	Nick Kyrgios; John Isner	7; 5	7^{7} 6^{5}	7^{7} 6^{5}
3	(Australia) (United States)	Sam Groth / John Peers; Steve Johnson / Jack Sock	6; 3	3; 6	2; 6	6; 2	3; 6
4	(Australia) (United States)	Nick Kyrgios; Sam Querrey	7^{7} 6^{4}	6; 3	6; 4
5	(Australia) (United States)	Sam Groth; John Isner	6^{5} 7^{7}	3; 6

World Group Semifinals

Belgium
3
Palais 12, Brussels, Belgium
15–17 September 2017
Clay (indoor)

Australia
2

			1	2	3	4	5
1	(Belgium) (Australia)	David Goffin; John Millman	6^{4} 7^{7}	6; 4	6; 3	7; 5
2	(Belgium) (Australia)	Steve Darcis; Nick Kyrgios	3; 6	6; 3	7^{7} 6^{5}	1; 6	2; 6
3	(Belgium) (Australia)	Ruben Bemelmans / Arthur De Greef; John Peers / Jordan Thompson	3; 6	4; 6	0; 6
4	(Belgium) (Australia)	David Goffin; Nick Kyrgios	6^{4} 7^{7}	6; 4	6; 4	6; 4
5	(Belgium) (Australia)	Steve Darcis; Jordan Thompson	6; 4	7; 5	6; 2

=== 2018 ===
World Group First round

Australia
1
Pat Rafter Arena, Brisbane, Australia
2–4 February
Hard

Germany
3

			1	2	3	4	5
1	(Australia) (Germany)	Alex de Minaur; Alexander Zverev	5; 7	6; 4	6; 4	3; 6	6^{4} 7^{7}
2	(Australia) (Germany)	Nick Kyrgios; Jan-Lennard Struff	6; 4	6; 4	6; 4
3	(Australia) (Germany)	Matthew Ebden / John Peers; Tim Pütz / Jan-Lennard Struff	4; 6	7^{7} 6^{1}	2; 6	7^{7} 6^{4}	4; 6
4	(Australia) (Germany)	Nick Kyrgios; Alexander Zverev	2; 6	6^{3} 7^{7}	2; 6
5	(Australia) (Germany)	Alex de Minaur; Jan-Lennard Struff						not played

World Group Play-offs

Austria
3
Messe Congress Graz, Graz, Austria
14–16 September
Clay

Australia
1

			1	2	3	4	5
1	(Austria) (Australia)	Dominic Thiem; Jordan Thompson	6; 1	6; 3	6; 0
2	(Austria) (Australia)	Dennis Novak; Alex de Minaur	3; 6	6; 2	6; 3	6; 2
3	(Austria) (Australia)	Oliver Marach / Jürgen Melzer; Lleyton Hewitt / John Peers	1; 6	4; 6	6; 3	5; 7
4	(Austria) (Australia)	Dominic Thiem; Alex de Minaur	6; 4	6; 2	3; 6	6; 4
5	(Austria) (Australia)	Dennis Novak; Jordan Thompson						not played

=== 2019 ===
Qualifying round

Australia
4
Memorial Drive Tennis Club, Adelaide, Australia
1–2 February 2019
Hard

Bosnia and Herzegovina
0

			1	2	3
1	(Australia) (Bosnia and Herzegovina)	John Millman; Damir Džumhur	6; 3	6; 2
2	(Australia) (Bosnia and Herzegovina)	Alex de Minaur; Mirza Bašić	6; 3	7^{7} 6^{0}
3	(Australia) (Bosnia and Herzegovina)	John Peers / Jordan Thompson; Mirza Bašić / Tomislav Brkić	7; 5	6; 1
4	(Australia) (Bosnia and Herzegovina)	Alexei Popyrin; Nerman Fatić	6; 1	7^{7} 6^{2}
5	(Australia) (Bosnia and Herzegovina)	John Millman; Mirza Bašić				not played

Group Stage Group D

Australia
3
Estadio 3, Caja Mágica, Madrid, Spain
19 November 2019
Hard (indoor)

Colombia
0

			1	2	3
1	(Australia) (Colombia)	Nick Kyrgios; Alejandro González	6; 4	6; 4
2	(Australia) (Colombia)	Alex de Minaur; Daniel Elahi Galán	6; 4	6; 3
3	(Australia) (Colombia)	John Peers / Jordan Thompson; Juan Sebastián Cabal / Robert Farah	6; 3	3; 6	7^{8} 6^{6}

Group Stage Group D

Belgium
1
Estadio 3, Caja Mágica, Madrid, Spain
20 November 2019
Hard (indoor)

Australia
2

			1	2	3
1	(Belgium) (Australia)	Steve Darcis; Nick Kyrgios	2; 6	6^{9} 7^{11}
2	(Belgium) (Australia)	David Goffin; Alex de Minaur	0; 6	6^{4} 7^{7}
3	(Belgium) (Australia)	Sander Gillé / Joran Vliegen; John Peers / Jordan Thompson	0; 1			retired

Quarterfinals

Australia
1
Estadio Manolo Santana, Caja Mágica, Madrid, Spain
21 November 2019
Hard (indoor)

Canada
2

			1	2	3
1	(Australia) (Canada)	John Millman; Vasek Pospisil	6^{7} 7^{9}	4; 6
2	(Australia) (Canada)	Alex de Minaur; Denis Shapovalov	3; 6	6; 3	7; 5
3	(Australia) (Canada)	John Peers / Jordan Thompson; Vasek Pospisil / Denis Shapovalov	4; 6	4; 6

== 2020s ==
=== 2020–21 ===
Qualifying round

Australia
3
Memorial Drive Tennis Centre, Adelaide, Australia
6–7 March 2020
Hard

Brazil
1

			1	2	3
1	(Australia) (Brazil)	Jordan Thompson; Thiago Monteiro	6; 4	6; 4
2	(Australia) (Brazil)	John Millman; Thiago Seyboth Wild	4; 6	7^{7} 6^{0}	6; 2
3	(Australia) (Brazil)	James Duckworth / John Peers; Marcelo Demoliner / Felipe Meligeni Alves	7; 5	5; 7	6^{6} 7^{8}
4	(Australia) (Brazil)	John Millman; Thiago Monteiro	6^{6} 7^{8}	7^{7} 6^{3}	7^{7} 6^{3}
5	(Australia) (Brazil)	Jordan Thompson; Thiago Seyboth Wild				not played

Group Stage Group D

Croatia
3
Pala Alpitour, Turin, Italy
25 November 2021
Hard (indoor)

Australia
0

			1	2	3
1	(Croatia) (Australia)	Borna Gojo; Alexei Popyrin	7^{7} 6^{5}	7; 5
2	(Croatia) (Australia)	Marin Čilić; Alex de Minaur	6; 1	5; 7	6; 4
3	(Croatia) (Australia)	Nikola Mektić / Mate Pavić; Alex de Minaur / John Peers	6; 3	6; 1

Group Stage Group D

Australia
2
Pala Alpitour, Turin, Italy
27 November 2021
Hard (indoor)

Hungary
1

			1	2	3
1	(Australia) (Hungary)	John Millman; Zsombor Piros	6; 4	4; 6	3; 6
2	(Australia) (Hungary)	Alex de Minaur; Márton Fucsovics	7; 5	2; 6	7^{7} 6^{2}
3	(Australia) (Hungary)	Alex Bolt / John Peers; Fábián Marozsán / Zsombor Piros	6; 3	6^{11} 7^{13}	6; 3

=== 2022 ===
Qualifying round

Australia
3
Ken Rosewall Arena, Sydney, Australia
4–5 March 2022
Hard

Hungary
2

			1	2	3
1	(Australia) (Hungary)	Alex de Minaur; Zsombor Piros	7; 5	6; 2
2	(Australia) (Hungary)	Thanasi Kokkinakis; Márton Fucsovics	6^{4} 7^{7}	6; 1	3; 6
3	(Australia) (Hungary)	John Peers / Luke Saville; Fábián Marozsán / Máté Valkusz	4; 6	4; 6
4	(Australia) (Hungary)	Alex de Minaur; Márton Fucsovics	7^{7} 6^{4}	6; 4
5	(Australia) (Hungary)	Thanasi Kokkinakis; Zsombor Piros	6; 4	6; 4

Group Stage Group C

Belgium
0
Am Rothenbaum, Hamburg, Germany
13 September 2022
Hard (indoor)

Australia
3

			1	2	3
1	(Belgium) (Australia)	Zizou Bergs; Jason Kubler	4; 6	6; 1	3; 6
2	(Belgium) (Australia)	David Goffin; Alex de Minaur	2; 6	2; 6
3	(Belgium) (Australia)	Sander Gillé / Joran Vliegen; Matthew Ebden / Max Purcell	1; 6	3; 6

Group Stage Group C

France
1
Am Rothenbaum, Hamburg, Germany
15 September 2022
Hard (indoor)

Australia
2

			1	2	3
1	(France) (Australia)	Richard Gasquet; Jason Kubler	6; 2	6; 4
2	(France) (Australia)	Benjamin Bonzi; Alex de Minaur	3; 6	6; 1	4; 6
3	(France) (Australia)	Nicolas Mahut / Arthur Rinderknech; Matthew Ebden / Max Purcell	4; 6	4; 6

Group Stage Group C

Germany
2
Am Rothenbaum, Hamburg, Germany
18 September 2022
Hard (indoor)

Australia
1

			1	2	3
1	(Germany) (Australia)	Jan-Lennard Struff; Max Purcell	6; 1	7; 5
2	(Germany) (Australia)	Oscar Otte; Thanasi Kokkinakis	6^{6} 7^{8}	1; 6
3	(Germany) (Australia)	Kevin Krawietz / Tim Pütz; Matthew Ebden / Max Purcell	6; 4	6; 4

Quarterfinals

Netherlands
0
Martin Carpena Arena, Málaga, Spain
22 November 2022
Hard (indoor)

Australia
2

			1	2	3
1	(Netherlands) (Australia)	Tallon Griekspoor; Jordan Thompson	6; 4	5; 7	3; 6
2	(Netherlands) (Australia)	Botic van de Zandschulp; Alex de Minaur	7; 5	3; 6	4; 6
3	(Netherlands) (Australia)	Wesley Koolhof / Matwé Middelkoop; Matthew Ebden / Max Purcell				not played

Semifinals

Australia
2
Martin Carpena Arena, Málaga, Spain
25 November 2022
Hard (indoor)

Croatia
1

			1	2	3
1	(Australia) (Croatia)	Thanasi Kokkinakis; Borna Ćorić	4; 6	3; 6
2	(Australia) (Croatia)	Alex de Minaur; Marin Čilić	6; 2	6; 2
3	(Australia) (Croatia)	Max Purcell / Jordan Thompson; Nikola Mektić / Mate Pavić	6^{3} 7^{7}	7; 5	6; 4

Final

Canada
2
Martin Carpena Arena, Málaga, Spain
27 November 2022
Hard (indoor)

Australia
0

			1	2	3
1	(Canada) (Australia)	Denis Shapovalov; Thanasi Kokkinakis	6; 2	6; 4
2	(Canada) (Australia)	Félix Auger-Aliassime; Alex de Minaur	6; 3	6; 4
3	(Canada) (Australia)	Félix Auger-Aliassime / Vasek Pospisil; Max Purcell / Jordan Thompson				not played

=== 2023 ===
Group stage Group B

Australia
1
Manchester Arena, Manchester, United Kingdom
13 September 2023
Hard (indoor)

Great Britain
2

			1	2	3
1	(Australia) (United Kingdom)	Thanasi Kokkinakis; Jack Draper	7^{8} 6^{6}	3; 6	6^{4} 7^{7}
2	(Australia) (United Kingdom)	Alex de Minaur; Dan Evans	1; 6	6; 2	4; 6
3	(Australia) (United Kingdom)	Matthew Ebden / Max Purcell; Dan Evans / Neal Skupski	7^{7} 6^{5}	6; 4

Group stage Group B

Australia
2
Manchester Arena, Manchester, United Kingdom
14 September 2023
Hard (indoor)

France
1

			1	2	3
1	(Australia) (France)	Max Purcell; Adrian Mannarino	6^{4} 7^{7}	4; 6
2	(Australia) (France)	Alex de Minaur; Ugo Humbert	7^{7} 6^{2}	6; 3
3	(Australia) (France)	Matthew Ebden / Max Purcell; Nicolas Mahut / Édouard Roger-Vasselin	7; 5	6; 3

Group stage Group B

Australia
3
Manchester Arena, Manchester, United Kingdom
16 September 2023
Hard (indoor)

France
0

			1	2	3
1	(Australia) (France)	Thanasi Kokkinakis; Dominic Stricker	6; 3	7; 5
2	(Australia) (France)	Alex de Minaur; Marc-Andrea Hüsler	6; 4	6; 3
3	(Australia) (France)	Matthew Ebden / Max Purcell; Marc-Andrea Hüsler / Dominic Stricker	6; 2	6; 4

Quarterfinals

Netherlands
1
Martin Carpena Arena, Málaga, Spain
22 November 2023
Hard (indoor)

Australia
2

			1	2	3
1	(Netherlands) (Australia)	Tomáš Macháč; Jordan Thompson	6; 4	7; 5
2	(Netherlands) (Australia)	Jiří Lehečka; Alex de Minaur	6; 4	6^{2} 7^{7}	5; 7
3	(Netherlands) (Australia)	Jiří Lehečka / Adam Pavlásek; Matthew Ebden / Max Purcell	4; 6	5; 7

Semifinals

Finland
0
Martin Carpena Arena, Málaga, Spain
24 November 2023
Hard (indoor)

Australia
2

			1	2	3
1	(Finland) (Australia)	Otto Virtanen; Alexei Popyrin	6^{5} 7^{7}	2; 6
2	(Finland) (Australia)	Emil Ruusuvuori; Alex de Minaur	4; 6	3; 6
3	(Finland) (Australia)	Harri Heliövaara / Patrik Niklas-Salminen; Matthew Ebden / Max Purcell				not played

Final

Canada
0
Martin Carpena Arena, Málaga, Spain
26 November 2023
Hard (indoor)

Australia
2

			1	2	3
1	(Canada) (Australia)	Alexei Popyrin; Matteo Arnaldi	5; 7	6; 2	4; 6
2	(Canada) (Australia)	Alex de Minaur; Jannik Sinner	3; 6	0; 6
3	(Canada) (Australia)	Matthew Ebden / Max Purcell; Simone Bolelli / Lorenzo Sonego				not played

=== 2024 ===
Group stage Group B

Australia
2
Pavelló Municipal Font de Sant Lluís, Valencia, Spain
10 September 2024
Hard (indoor)

France
1

			1	2	3
1	(Australia) (France)	Thanasi Kokkinakis; Arthur Fils	7^{7} 6^{4}	7^{7} 6^{3}
2	(Australia) (France)	Alexei Popyrin; Ugo Humbert	3; 6	2; 6
3	(Australia) (France)	Matthew Ebden / Max Purcell; Pierre-Hugues Herbert / Édouard Roger-Vasselin	7; 5	5; 7	6; 3

Group stage Group B

Australia
3
Pavelló Municipal Font de Sant Lluís, Valencia, Spain
12 September 2024
Hard (indoor)

Czech Republic
0

			1	2	3
1	(Australia) (Czech Republic)	Thanasi Kokkinakis; Jakub Menšík	6; 2	6^{2} 7^{7}	6; 3
2	(Australia) (Czech Republic)	Alexei Popyrin; Tomáš Macháč	1; 0			retired
3	(Australia) (Czech Republic)	Matthew Ebden / Max Purcell; Jakub Menšík / Adam Pavlásek	6; 4	6; 2

Group stage Group B

Australia
1
Pavelló Municipal Font de Sant Lluís, Valencia, Spain
15 September 2024
Hard (indoor)

Spain
2

			1	2	3
1	(Australia) (Spain)	Jordan Thompson; Pablo Carreño Busta	6; 2	2; 6	6^{3} 7^{7}
2	(Australia) (Spain)	Alexei Popyrin; Pedro Martínez	6; 4	6; 4
3	(Australia) (Spain)	Matthew Ebden / Max Purcell; Marcel Granollers / Pedro Martínez	7; 5	4; 6	4; 6

Quarterfinals

United States
1
Martin Carpena Arena, Málaga, Spain
21 November 2024
Hard (indoor)

Australia
2

			1	2	3
1	(United States) (Australia)	Ben Shelton; Thanasi Kokkinakis	1; 6	6; 4	6^{14} 7^{16}
2	(United States) (Australia)	Taylor Fritz; Alex de Minaur	6; 3	6; 4
3	(United States) (Australia)	Tommy Paul / Ben Shelton; Matthew Ebden / Jordan Thompson	4; 6	4; 6

Semifinals

Italy
2
Martin Carpena Arena, Málaga, Spain
23 November 2024
Hard (indoor)

Australia
0

			1	2	3
1	(Italy) (Australia)	Matteo Berrettini; Thanasi Kokkinakis	6^{6} 7^{8}	6; 3	7; 5
2	(Italy) (Australia)	Jannik Sinner; Alex de Minaur	6; 3	6; 4
3	(Italy) (Australia)	Simone Bolelli / Andrea Vavassori; Matthew Ebden / Jordan Thompson				not played

=== 2025 ===
Qualifiers
First round

Sweden
1
Kungliga Tennishallen, Stockholm, Sweden
31 January–1 February 2025
Hard (indoor)

Australia
3

			1	2	3
1	(Sweden) (Australia)	Mikael Ymer; Alex de Minaur	5; 7	1; 6
2	(Sweden) (Australia)	Leo Borg; Aleksandar Vukic	4; 6	4; 6
3	(Sweden) (Australia)	Filip Bergevi / André Göransson; Matthew Ebden / John Peers	7^{9} 6^{7}	3; 6	2; 6
4	(Sweden) (Australia)	Leo Borg; John Peers	7; 5	6; 4
5	(Sweden) (Australia)	Mikael Ymer; Aleksandar Vukic				not played

Qualifiers
Second round

Australia
2
Ken Rosewall Arena, Sydney, Australia
13–14 September 2025
Hard

Belgium
3

			1	2	3
1	(Australia) (Belgium)	Alex de Minaur; Raphaël Collignon	5; 7	6; 3	3; 6
2	(Australia) (Belgium)	Jordan Thompson; Zizou Bergs	6^{4} 7^{7}	4; 6
3	(Australia) (Belgium)	Jordan Thompson / Rinky Hijikata; Sander Gillé / Joran Vliegen	6^{7} 7^{9}	6; 3	6; 4
4	(Australia) (Belgium)	Alex de Minaur; Zizou Bergs	6; 2	7; 5
5	(Australia) (Belgium)	Aleksandar Vukic; Raphaël Collignon	7^{7} 6^{5}	2; 6	3; 6

== See also ==
- Australia Davis Cup team results (1905–1949)
- Australia Davis Cup team results (1950–1979)
- Australia Davis Cup team results (1980–2009)
