= Munawar Iqbal =

Pakistani tennis player (born 1948)

- Country (sports): Pakistan
- Residence: Pakistan
- Born: February 27, 1948 (age 77); Lahore, Pakistan
- Height: N/A
- Turned pro: 1964
- Plays: Right-handed
- Prize money: N/A

Singles
- Career record: 81–73 (51.2%)
- Career titles: 8
- Highest ranking: No. 257 (July 29, 1974)

Grand Slam singles results
- French Open: 1R (1974)
- Wimbledon: 1R (1973)

Doubles
- Career record: 0–1
- Career titles: 0
- Highest ranking: N/A
- Last updated on: June 24, 2007.

Munawar Iqbal (born 27 February 1948 in Lahore) is a former Pakistani professional tennis player. He was 16 when he first played for Pakistan at the Davis Cup, first competing in 1964. Between 1964 and 1978 Iqbal contested 10 career singles finals and won 8 titles. He also won a tennis bronze medal at the 1974 Asian Games.

== Grand Slams ==
Iqbal played his first tournament at the Lowther tournament at Barnes in 1964. In 1968 he reached his first tournament final at the Carmarthenshire Championships at Carmarthen losing to Ray Keldie. He won his first title at the Budleigh Salterton tournament in 1969 against John de Mendoza. The same year he won the Central Grass Court Championships at Lahore. In 1970 he played at ten tournaments and won titles at the Cranleigh Open, the Exmouth Open and a second title at Budleigh Salterton. He was also a finalist at the Ilkley Open.

In 1971 he won his first Pakistan National Championships at Lahore against Mohammed Elahi, and the same year he up picked the Pakistan Hardcourt title at Karachi. In 1973, he made it to the first round of the Wimbledon singles. In 1972 won his final, and second title at the Pakistan National Championships at Lahore against Sayed Saeed Meer. In 1974, he made it into the first round singles of the French Open.

Iqbal made it to the first round of the US Open doubles, partnered by fellow Pakistani Saeed Meer. He also played the mixed doubles at Wimbledon with Briton Jackie Fayter, the furthest they got to was the third round. Iqbal played his last tournament in 1978 at the Eastern Fall Championships at Roslyn, New York.
