= Kim Sung-bae (tennis) =

South Korean tennis player

- Country (sports): South Korea
- Born: 10 October 1948 (age 76)

Singles

Grand Slam singles results
- French Open: Q1 (1973)
- Wimbledon: Q1 (1973)

Doubles

Grand Slam doubles results
- French Open: 1R (1973)

Grand Slam mixed doubles results
- Wimbledon: 2R (1973)

Kim Sung-bae (born 10 October 1948) is a South Korean former professional tennis player.

As a member of the South Korea Davis Cup team in the 1970s, Kim participated in six ties and achieved his most notable victory against Japan's Jun Kamiwazumi. He was the Korean national champion in 1971 and 1973. His career included main draw appearances at both the French Open and Wimbledon.

Kim became South Korea's national coach in the 1980s and has also worked as a television commentator.

== See also ==
- List of South Korea Davis Cup team representatives
