= Atet Wijono =

Indonesian tennis player

- Country (sports): Indonesia
- Born: 11 March 1951 (age 75) Cirebon, West Java; Indonesia

Singles
- Career titles: 0

Grand Slam singles results
- French Open: 1R (1971)
- US Open: 1R (1970)

Doubles
- Career titles: 1
Medal record
Men's tennis
Representing Indonesia
Asian Games
Gold medal – first place	1978 Bangkok	Singles
Gold medal – first place	1978 Bangkok	Team
SEA Games
Gold medal – first place	1977 Kuala Lumpur	Singles
Gold medal – first place	1977 Kuala Lumpur	Doubles
Gold medal – first place	1977 Kuala Lumpur	Team
Gold medal – first place	1979 Jakarta	Doubles
Gold medal – first place	1979 Jakarta	Team
Gold medal – first place	1981 Manila	Team
Silver medal – second place	1981 Manila	Mixed doubles

Atet Wijono (born 11 March 1951) is a former tennis player from Indonesia.

== Career ==
Wijono appeared in two Grand Slam tournaments during his career, the 1970 US Open, where he was beaten in the first round by Pancho Segura and the 1971 French Open, where he also lost in the opening round, to François Jauffret. He won a Grand Prix doubles title in 1971, when he teamed up with countryman Gondo Widjojo at a clay court tournament in Senigallia, Italy. They defeated the home pairing of Ezio Di Matteo and Antonio Zugarelli.

From 1969 to 1982, Wijono was a regular fixture in the Indonesia Davis Cup team. He twice beat Indian Anand Amritraj and also had a win over Australian John Cooper. His overall Davis Cup record is 13/25, with eight singles wins and five doubles victories.

He was a singles gold medalist at the 1978 Asian Games in Bangkok, defeating Japan's Shigeyuki Nishio in the gold medal playoff. The Indonesian is also a SEA Games gold medalist.

His contributions to the SEA Games reached peak at the 1977 SEA Games in Kuala Lumpur. In that edition, Wijono competed as a key player on the national team, having already accumulated extensive experience in the Davis Cup since 1969. In the men’s singles event, he won a gold medal. This achievement stands as the only men's singles gold medal he won at the SEA Games throughout his career, while also bringing the men’s singles title back to Indonesia after it had been claimed by representatives from other countries in the two previous editions.

In addition to the singles event, Wijono also won a gold medal in men’s doubles alongside Gondo Widjojo, as well as a gold medal in the men’s team event alongside Yustedjo Tarik, Hadiman, and Gondo Widjojo. Thus, at the 1977 SEA Games, he secured three gold medals.

At the 1979 SEA Games in Jakarta, the men’s singles title was won by Yustedjo Tarik. In that edition, Wijono continued to contribute by winning gold medals in the men’s doubles and men’s team events. At the 1981 SEA Games in Manila, Wijono won a gold medal in the men’s team event and a silver medal in mixed doubles.

== Grand Prix career finals ==
=== Doubles: 1 (title) ===
Result	W–L	Date	Tournament	Surface	Partner	Opponents	Score	Ref
Win	1–0	Aug 1971	Senigallia, Italy	Clay	(Indonesia) Gondo Widjojo	(Italy) Ezio Di Matteo (Italy) Antonio Zugarelli	7–5, 3–6, 7–5	

== ITF Masters Tour ==
=== Doubles: 1 (title) ===
Legend Category World Championships Category MT1000 Category MT700 Category MT400 Category MT200 Category MT100 (1–0)	Finals by surface Hard (1–0) Clay (0–0) Grass (0–0) Carpet (0–0)

Result	W–L	Date	Tournament	Tier	Age	Surface	Partner	Opponent	Score	Ref
Win	1–0	Oct 2017	Indonesia International Seniors Championships	G5/MT 100	65+	Hard	(Indonesia) Hadiman	(Indonesia) Husni Madjid (Indonesia) Samudra Sangitan	6–1, 6–2	
