= Kim Moon-il =

South Korean businessman, tennis administrator, coach and professional player

- Country (sports): South Korea
- Born: 12 April 1947 (age 77); Gokseong, Korea

Doubles

Grand Slam doubles results
- French Open: 1R (1973)

Grand Slam mixed doubles results
- Wimbledon: 1R (1973)

Kim Moon-il (born 12 April 1947) is a South Korean businessman, tennis administrator, coach and former professional player. He has also been a political candidate for the National Assembly of the Republic of Korea.

Born in Gokseong, Kim competed for the South Korea Davis Cup team between 1968 and 1978. He played in the doubles main draw of both the French Open and Wimbledon in 1973, then later served as a chair umpire at the Australian Open. From 1982 to 1994 he was the national tennis coach for South Korea.

Kim stood unsuccessfully as a candidate at the 1992 and 2008 National Assembly elections.

== See also ==
- List of South Korea Davis Cup team representatives
