= Gondo Widjojo =

Indonesian tennis player

- Full name: Gondo Widjojo
- Country (sports): Indonesia
- Born: 23 June 1945
- Died: 21 August 1992

Singles
- Career titles: 0

Grand Slam singles results
- Australian Open: 1R (1968)

Doubles
- Career titles: 1

Grand Slam doubles results
- Australian Open: 1R (1968, 1970)
- French Open: 2R (1971)
- US Open: 1R (1971)

Mixed doubles

Grand Slam mixed doubles results
- Australian Open: 1R (1968)

Gondo Widjojo (23 June 1945 – 21 August 1992) was a tennis player from Indonesia.

== Biography ==
Widjojo competed in the men's singles, doubles and mixed doubles draws at the 1968 Australian Championships. All of his other Grand Slam appearances were in the men's doubles, at the 1970 Australian Open, 1971 French Open and 1971 US Open. He won a Grand Prix doubles title in 1971, when he teamed up with countryman Atet Wijono at a clay court tournament in Senigallia, Italy. They defeated the home pairing of Ezio Di Matteo and Antonio Zugarelli. His best singles performance was a quarter-final appearance at the Jakarta Open in 1973.

A regular Davis Cup representative for Indonesia, Widjojo played in a total of 20 ties for his national team. His representative career included a win over Australian player Colin Dibley in 1971 and a rare Davis Cup triple bagel when he beat Hong Kong's Po Tao in 1973. By the time he made his last appearance in 1981 he had played 37 matches, for 12 wins. He was posthumously awarded a Davis Cup Commitment Award in 2015.

== Grand Prix career finals ==
=== Doubles: 1 (1–0) ===
Result	W–L	Date	Tournament	Surface	Partner	Opponents	Score
Win	1–0	Aug 1971	Senigallia, Italy	Clay	(Indonesia) Atet Wijono	(Italy) Ezio Di Matteo (Italy) Antonio Zugarelli	7–5, 3–6, 7–5
