= 1974 Davis Cup Europe Zone =

International tennis competition

The Europe Zone was one of the three regional zones of the 1974 Davis Cup.

33 teams entered the Europe Zone, competing across 2 sub-zones. 8 teams entered the competition in the pre-qualifying rounds, with 3 teams progressing to the preliminary rounds to join an additional 21 teams. From these 24 teams, 8 teams progressed to the main draw to join the 4 finalists from the 1973 Europe Zone.

The winners of each sub-zone's main draw went on to compete in the Inter-Zonal Zone against the winners of the Americas Zone and Eastern Zone.

Italy defeated Romania in the Zone A final, and the Soviet Union defeated Czechoslovakia in the Zone B final, resulting in both Italy and the Soviet Union progressing to the Inter-Zonal Zone.

== Zone A ==
=== Pre-qualifying rounds ===
==== Draw ====
First Round
Istanbul, Turkey (indoor clay)
Turkey	3
Lebanon	2
bye
Luxembourg

Qualifying Round
Istanbul, Turkey
Turkey	5
Luxembourg	0

==== First round ====
Turkey vs. Lebanon

Turkey
3
Istanbul, Turkey
5–7 October 1973
Clay (indoors)

Lebanon
2

			1	2	3	4	5
1	(Turkey) (Lebanon)	Arif Koçak; Khoder Issa	6; 4	6; 3	6; 0
2	(Turkey) (Lebanon)	Hasan Özdemir; Najdo Abou Hassoun	1; 6	1; 6	5; 7
3	(Turkey) (Lebanon)	Tahsin Gürsoy / Arif Koçak; Alan Wilkinson / Eric Wilkinson	6; 2	6; 1	6; 3
4	(Turkey) (Lebanon)	Hasan Özdemir; Khoder Issa	6; 4	8; 10	3; 6	1; 6
5	(Turkey) (Lebanon)	Arif Koçak; Najdo Abou Hassoun	3; 6	6; 1	6; 0	6; 4

==== Qualifying round ====
Turkey vs. Luxembourg

Turkey
5
Istanbul, Turkey
28–30 December 1973

Luxembourg
0

			1	2	3	4	5
1	(Turkey) (Luxembourg)	Remzi Aydın; Jean Neuman	6; 0	6; 4	6; 4
2	(Turkey) (Luxembourg)	Tahsin Gürsoy; Georges Logelin	6; 4	6; 3	7; 5
3	(Turkey) (Luxembourg)	Remzi Aydın / Tahsin Gürsoy; Georges Logelin / Jean Neuman	6; 1	6; 4	7; 5
4	(Turkey) (Luxembourg)	Hasan Özdemir; Georges Logelin	6; 3	8; 6	6; 1
5	(Turkey) (Luxembourg)	Arif Koçak; Jean Neuman	6; 0	6; 2	6; 3

=== Preliminary rounds ===
==== Draw ====
First Round
New Zealand
bye
Zürich, Switzerland
Switzerland	2
Austria	3
France
bye
Lisbon, Portugal (clay)
Portugal	4
Ireland	1
Warsaw, Poland
Poland	3
Hungary	2
bye
Sweden
Helsinki, Finland
Finland	5
Turkey	0
bye
Netherlands

Qualifying Round
Vienna, Austria
New Zealand	1
Austria	3
Porto, Portugal (clay)
France	5
Portugal	0
Båstad, Sweden (clay)
Poland	1
Sweden	4
Scheveningen, Netherlands (clay)
Finland	1
Netherlands	4

==== First round ====
Switzerland vs. Austria

Switzerland
2
Zürich, Switzerland
22–24 March 1974

Austria
3

			1	2	3	4	5
1	(Switzerland) (Austria)	Petr Kanderal; Peter Pokorny	6; 3	6; 3	7; 9	8; 6
2	(Switzerland) (Austria)	Michel Burgener; Hans Kary	3; 6	7; 9	2; 6
3	(Switzerland) (Austria)	Michel Burgener / Petr Kanderal; Hans Kary / Peter Pokorny	5; 7	4; 6	4; 6
4	(Switzerland) (Austria)	Petr Kanderal; Hans Kary	8; 6	7; 5	6; 3
5	(Switzerland) (Austria)	Michel Burgener; Peter Pokorny	3; 6	4; 6	0; 6

Portugal vs. Ireland

Portugal
4
Estádio Nacional, Lisbon, Portugal
12–14 April 1974
Clay

Ireland
1

			1	2	3	4	5
1	(Portugal) (Republic of Ireland)	José Vilela; Kevin Menton	6; 4	6; 4	3; 6	6; 3
2	(Portugal) (Republic of Ireland)	Raúl Peralta; Michael Hickey	7; 5	6; 4	6; 8	6; 8	8; 6
3	(Portugal) (Republic of Ireland)	Alfredo Vaz Pinto / José Vilela; Desmond Early / Michael Hickey	3; 6	6; 4	3; 6	6; 2	5; 7
4	(Portugal) (Republic of Ireland)	José Vilela; Michael Hickey	7; 9	6; 3	6; 2	6; 3
5	(Portugal) (Republic of Ireland)	Raúl Peralta; Peter Ledbetter	6; 1	2; 6	6; 2	6; 3

Poland vs. Hungary

Poland
3
Warsaw, Poland
19–21 April 1974

Hungary
2

			1	2	3	4	5
1	(Poland) (Hungary)	Jacek Niedźwiedzki; Balázs Taróczy	2; 6	6; 4	3; 6	2; 6
2	(Poland) (Hungary)	Wojciech Fibak; Péter Szőke	6; 4	3; 6	6; 2	6; 4
3	(Poland) (Hungary)	Wojciech Fibak / Tadeusz Nowicki; Róbert Machán / Balázs Taróczy	4; 6	16; 14	6; 3	7; 5
4	(Poland) (Hungary)	Jacek Niedźwiedzki; Péter Szőke	6; 3	1; 6	3; 6	4; 6
5	(Poland) (Hungary)	Wojciech Fibak; Balázs Taróczy	4; 6	6; 4	5; 7	7; 5	6; 3

Finland vs. Turkey

Finland
5
Helsinki, Finland
19–21 April 1974

Turkey
0

			1	2	3	4	5
1	(Finland) (Turkey)	George Berner; Hasan Özdemir	6; 0	6; 1	6; 0
2	(Finland) (Turkey)	Matti Timonen; Remzi Aydın	6; 1	6; 1	6; 1
3	(Finland) (Turkey)	Jukka Narakka / Matti Timonen; Tahsin Gürsoy / Hasan Özdemir	9; 7	6; 4	6; 2
4	(Finland) (Turkey)	Matti Timonen; Tahsin Gürsoy	6; 2	6; 2	6; 0
5	(Finland) (Turkey)	George Berner; Remzi Aydın	6; 2	6; 1	6; 1

==== Qualifying round ====
Austria vs. New Zealand

Austria
3
Vienna, Austria
3–5 May 1974

New Zealand
1

			1	2	3	4	5
1	(Austria) (New Zealand)	Peter Pokorny; Onny Parun	4; 6	2; 6	2; 6
2	(Austria) (New Zealand)	Hans Kary; Jeff Simpson	6; 4	6; 3	7; 5
3	(Austria) (New Zealand)	Hans Kary / Peter Pokorny; Onny Parun / Jeff Simpson	3; 6	7; 5	3; 6	6; 3	6; 2
4	(Austria) (New Zealand)	Peter Pokorny; Jeff Simpson	6; 1	6; 2	9; 11	6; 3
5	(Austria) (New Zealand)	Hans Kary; Onny Parun	6; 8	6; 4	2; 6	7; 7		not completed

Portugal vs. France

Portugal
0
Lawn Tennis Club da Foz, Porto, Portugal
4–5 May 1974
Clay

France
5

			1	2	3	4	5
1	(Portugal) (France)	José Vilela; François Jauffret	0; 6	3; 6	1; 6
2	(Portugal) (France)	Sergio Cruz; Georges Goven	1; 6	1; 6	4; 6
3	(Portugal) (France)	Raúl Peralta / José Vilela; Jean-François Caujolle / Wanaro N'Godrella	6; 1	7; 9	1; 6	6; 2	2; 6
4	(Portugal) (France)	Sergio Cruz; François Jauffret	1; 6	0; 6	2; 6
5	(Portugal) (France)	José Vilela; Georges Goven	2; 6	4; 6	6; 4	6; 4	3; 6

Sweden vs. Poland

Sweden
4
Båstad Tennis Stadium, Båstad, Sweden
17–19 May 1974
Clay

Poland
1

			1	2	3	4	5
1	(Sweden) (Poland)	Björn Borg; Tadeusz Nowicki	2; 6	6; 2	0; 6	6; 1	6; 1
2	(Sweden) (Poland)	Leif Johansson; Wojciech Fibak	6; 4	2; 6	6; 3	7; 5
3	(Sweden) (Poland)	Ove Bengtson / Björn Borg; Wojciech Fibak / Tadeusz Nowicki	6; 4	6; 8	6; 2	6; 4
4	(Sweden) (Poland)	Björn Borg; Wojciech Fibak	6; 0	6; 4	6; 3
5	(Sweden) (Poland)	Leif Johansson; Tadeusz Nowicki	0; 6	3; 6	11; 13

Netherlands vs. Finland

Netherlands
4
Scheveningen, Netherlands
10–12 May 1974
Clay

Finland
1

			1	2	3	4	5
1	(Netherlands) (Finland)	Rolf Thung; Pekka Säilä	6; 2	6; 4	6; 4
2	(Netherlands) (Finland)	Jan Hordijk; George Berner	8; 6	6; 1	7; 5
3	(Netherlands) (Finland)	Fred Hemmes / Rolf Thung; Jukka Narakka / Pekka Säilä	6; 3	6; 3	8; 6
4	(Netherlands) (Finland)	Rolf Thung; George Berner	4; 6	6; 2	3; 6	6; 8
5	(Netherlands) (Finland)	Jan Hordijk; Pekka Säilä	6; 0	6; 1	6; 1

=== Main Draw ===
==== Draw ====
Quarterfinals; 10–12 May; 24–26 May
Romania
bye
Vienna, Austria
Austria	1
France	3
Båstad, Sweden (clay)
Sweden	4
Netherlands	1
bye
Italy

Semifinals; 19–21 July
Bucharest, Romania (clay)
Romania	3
France	2
Båstad, Sweden (clay)
Sweden	2
Italy	3

Final; 2–4 August
Mestre, Italy (clay)
Romania	2
Italy	3

==== Quarterfinals ====
Austria vs. France

Austria
1
Vienna, Austria
10–12 May 1974

France
3

			1	2	3	4	5
1	(Austria) (France)	Hans Kary; François Jauffret	7; 5	6; 1	9; 7
2	(Austria) (France)	Peter Pokorny; Georges Goven	2; 6	2; 6	2; 6
3	(Austria) (France)	Hans Kary / Peter Pokorny; Pierre Barthès / François Jauffret	5; 7	4; 6	2; 6
4	(Austria) (France)	Peter Pokorny; François Jauffret	4; 6	2; 6	3; 6
5	(Austria) (France)	Hans Kary; Georges Goven	6; 2	6; 4	4; 6	6; 8	3; 5	not completed

Sweden vs. Netherlands

Sweden
4
Båstad Tennis Stadium, Båstad, Sweden
24–26 May 1974
Clay

Netherlands
1

			1	2	3	4	5
1	(Sweden) (Netherlands)	Björn Borg; Rolf Thung	4; 6	6; 4	6; 1	6; 1
2	(Sweden) (Netherlands)	Leif Johansson; Jan Hordijk	5; 7	4; 6	6; 0	6; 1	6; 2
3	(Sweden) (Netherlands)	Ove Bengtson / Björn Borg; Fred Hemmes / Rolf Thung	6; 2	7; 9	6; 1	6; 1
4	(Sweden) (Netherlands)	Leif Johansson; Rolf Thung	6; 4	6; 4	1; 6	3; 6	3; 6
5	(Sweden) (Netherlands)	Björn Borg; Fred Hemmes	6; 3	6; 3	6; 1

==== Semifinals ====
Romania vs. France

Romania
3
Bucharest, Romania
19–21 July 1974
Clay

France
2

			1	2	3	4	5
1	(Romania) (France)	Ilie Năstase; François Jauffret	6; 2	4; 6	2; 6	3; 6
2	(Romania) (France)	Toma Ovici; Pierre Barthès	6; 1	10; 8	6; 2
3	(Romania) (France)	Ilie Năstase / Ion Țiriac; Pierre Barthès / François Jauffret	6; 2	6; 4	9; 7
4	(Romania) (France)	Toma Ovici; François Jauffret	2; 6	4; 6	6; 4	5; 7
5	(Romania) (France)	Ilie Năstase; Pierre Barthès	6; 2	6; 3	6; 3

Sweden vs. Italy

Sweden
2
Båstad Tennis Stadium, Båstad, Sweden
19–21 July 1974
Clay

Italy
3

			1	2	3	4	5
1	(Sweden) (Italy)	Björn Borg; Paolo Bertolucci	7; 5	6; 1	6; 0
2	(Sweden) (Italy)	Leif Johansson; Adriano Panatta	6; 8	1; 6	6; 4	1; 6
3	(Sweden) (Italy)	Ove Bengtson / Björn Borg; Paolo Bertolucci / Adriano Panatta	1; 6	7; 5	5; 7	4; 6
4	(Sweden) (Italy)	Leif Johansson; Paolo Bertolucci	6; 3	3; 6	7; 5	5; 7	6; 8
5	(Sweden) (Italy)	Björn Borg; Adriano Panatta	6; 4	4; 6	9; 7	6; 3

==== Final ====
Italy vs. Romania

Italy
3
Mestre, Italy
2–4 August 1974
Clay

Romania
2

			1	2	3	4	5
1	(Italy) (Romania)	Corrado Barazzutti; Ilie Năstase	7; 9	0; 6	1; 6
2	(Italy) (Romania)	Adriano Panatta; Ion Țiriac	6; 1	6; 3	6; 2
3	(Italy) (Romania)	Paolo Bertolucci / Adriano Panatta; Ilie Năstase / Ion Țiriac	6; 4	8; 6	6; 8	4; 6	6; 2
4	(Italy) (Romania)	Corrado Barazzutti; Ion Țiriac	6; 3	6; 0	6; 0
5	(Italy) (Romania)	Adriano Panatta; Ilie Năstase	0; 6	0; 6	5; 7

== Zone B ==
=== Pre-qualifying rounds ===
==== Draw ====
First Round
Egypt
bye
Lagos, Nigeria
Nigeria	2
Morocco	3
bye
Iran
bye
Israel

Qualifying Round
Cairo, Egypt
Egypt	3
Morocco	0
Tehran, Iran
Iran	4
Israel	1

==== First round ====
Nigeria vs. Morocco

Nigeria
2
Lagos, Nigeria
17–19 December 1973

Morocco
3

			1	2	3	4	5
1	(Nigeria) (Morocco)	Thompson Onibokun; Ahmed Ben Omar	6; 3	3; 6	6; 1	1; 6	8; 6
2	(Nigeria) (Morocco)	Lawrence Awopegba; Omar Laimina	5; 7	2; 6	2; 6
3	(Nigeria) (Morocco)	Lawrence Awopegba / Thompson Onibokun; Ahmed Ben Omar / Omar Laimina	5; 7	4; 6	4; 6
4	(Nigeria) (Morocco)	Lawrence Awopegba; Ahmed Ben Omar	6; 4	6; 3	6; 1
5	(Nigeria) (Morocco)	Thompson Onibokun; Omar Laimina	1; 6	4; 6	4; 6

==== Qualifying round ====
Egypt vs. Morocco

Egypt
3
Cairo, Egypt
11–13 January 1974

Morocco
0

			1	2	3	4	5
1	(Egypt) (Morocco)	Aly El Dawoudi; Ahmed Ben Omar	6; 2	6; 1	6; 1
2	(Egypt) (Morocco)	Ismail El Shafei; Omar Laimina	6; 3	7; 5	6; 0
3	(Egypt) (Morocco)	Aly El Dawoudi / Ismail El Shafei; Ahmed Ben Omar / Omar Laimina	6; 1	10; 8	6; 1
4	(Egypt) (Morocco)	Aly El Dawoudi; Omar Laimina						not played
5	(Egypt) (Morocco)	Ismail El Shafei; Ahmed Ben Omar						not played

Iran vs. Israel

Iran
4
Tehran, Iran
5–7 April 1974

Israel
1

			1	2	3	4	5
1	(Iran) (Israel)	Taghi Akbari; Felix Kaplan	6; 1	6; 3	6; 3
2	(Iran) (Israel)	Hussain Akbari; Yehoshua Shalem	6; 4	6; 4	6; 4
3	(Iran) (Israel)	Kamyab Derafshijavan / Ali Madani; Ruben Porges / Yair Wertheimer	6; 4	6; 2	3; 6	6; 3
4	(Iran) (Israel)	Taghi Akbari; Yehoshua Shalem	6; 2	6; 2	4; 6	9; 7
5	(Iran) (Israel)	Hussain Akbari; Felix Kaplan	6; 3	5; 7	1; 6	8; 6	3; 6

=== Preliminary rounds ===
==== Draw ====
First Round
West Germany
bye
Monte Carlo, Monaco (clay)
Monaco	2
Denmark	3
Spain
bye
Oslo, Norway (indoor hard)
Norway	4
Iran	1
Cairo, Egypt
Egypt	3
Bulgaria	1
bye
Great Britain
Brussels, Belgium
Belgium	5
Greece	0
bye
Yugoslavia

Qualifying Round
West Berlin (clay)
West Germany	5
Denmark	0
Barcelona, Spain (clay)
Spain	5
Norway	0
Cairo, Egypt (clay)
Egypt	5
Great Britain	0
Brussels, Belgium
Belgium	2
Yugoslavia	3

==== First round ====
Monaco vs. Denmark

Monaco
2
Monte Carlo, Monaco
19–21 April 1974
Clay

Denmark
3

			1	2	3	4	5
1	(Monaco) (Denmark)	Louis Borfiga; Lars Elvstrøm	2; 6	4; 6	4; 6
2	(Monaco) (Denmark)	Bernard Balleret; Tom Christensen	6; 2	7; 5	6; 3
3	(Monaco) (Denmark)	Bernard Balleret / Louis Borfiga; Tom Christensen / Knud-Erik Nielsen	6; 4	2; 6	2; 6	7; 5	6; 8
4	(Monaco) (Denmark)	Louis Borfiga; Tom Christensen	6; 1	6; 1	6; 2
5	(Monaco) (Denmark)	Bernard Balleret; Lars Elvstrøm	2; 6	4; 6	2; 6

Norway vs. Iran

Norway
4
Oslo, Norway
19–21 April 1974
Hard (indoors)

Iran
1

			1	2	3	4	5
1	(Norway) (Iran)	Per Hegna; Hussain Akbari	6; 1	7; 5	6; 1
2	(Norway) (Iran)	Thorvald Moe; Taghi Akbari	2; 6	6; 3	5; 7	5; 7
3	(Norway) (Iran)	Per Hegna / Thorvald Moe; Kamyab Derafshijavan / Ali Madani	6; 1	6; 2	6; 2
4	(Norway) (Iran)	Per Hegna; Taghi Akbari	6; 2	7; 5	4; 6	6; 2
5	(Norway) (Iran)	Thorvald Moe; Hussain Akbari	6; 4	6; 2	6; 3

Egypt vs. Bulgaria

Egypt
3
Cairo, Egypt
19–21 April 1974

Bulgaria
1

			1	2	3	4	5
1	(Egypt) (Bulgaria)	Aly El Dawoudi; Bozhidar Pampoulov	6; 1	2; 6	6; 2	6; 1
2	(Egypt) (Bulgaria)	Ibrahim Mahmoud; Ljuben Genov	3; 6	3; 6	2; 6
3	(Egypt) (Bulgaria)	Aly El Dawoudi / Ibrahim Mahmoud; Bozhidar Pampoulov / Matei Pampoulov	3; 6	6; 3	6; 3	6; 8	6; 2
4	(Egypt) (Bulgaria)	Aly El Dawoudi; Ljuben Genov	8; 6	7; 5	6; 4
5	(Egypt) (Bulgaria)	Ibrahim Mahmoud; Bozhidar Pampoulov	14; 12	6; 3	4; 6			not completed

Belgium vs. Greece

Belgium
5
Brussels, Belgium
19–21 April 1974

Greece
0

			1	2	3	4	5
1	(Belgium) (Greece)	Patrick Hombergen; Nicolas Kelaidis	6; 3	6; 4	6; 1
2	(Belgium) (Greece)	Bernard Mignot; Nicholas Kalogeropoulos	6; 2	7; 5	1; 6	6; 4
3	(Belgium) (Greece)	Patrick Hombergen / Bernard Mignot; Nicholas Kalogeropoulos / Nicolas Kelaidis	6; 1	6; 2	9; 7
4	(Belgium) (Greece)	Bernard Mignot; Nicolas Kelaidis	6; 3	6; 1	6; 1
5	(Belgium) (Greece)	Patrick Hombergen; Nicholas Kalogeropoulos	6; 1	6; 4	6; 3

==== Qualifying round ====
West Germany vs. Denmark

West Germany
5
West Berlin
3–5 May 1974
Clay

Denmark
0

			1	2	3	4	5
1	(West Germany) (Denmark)	Hans-Jürgen Pohmann; Knud-Erik Nielsen	6; 0	6; 0	6; 3
2	(West Germany) (Denmark)	Karl Meiler; Lars Elvstrøm	4; 6	6; 0	6; 3	6; 0
3	(West Germany) (Denmark)	Jürgen Fassbender / Hans-Jürgen Pohmann; Lars Elvstrøm / Knud-Erik Nielsen	6; 2	6; 0	6; 1
4	(West Germany) (Denmark)	Jürgen Fassbender; Finn Christensen	6; 1	6; 0	6; 1
5	(West Germany) (Denmark)	Karl Meiler; Knud-Erik Nielsen	1; 6	7; 5	6; 1	6; 1

Spain vs. Norway

Spain
5
Barcelona, Spain
3–5 May 1974
Clay

Norway
0

			1	2	3	4	5
1	(Spain) (Norway)	José Higueras; Thorvald Moe	6; 1	6; 2	6; 2
2	(Spain) (Norway)	Manuel Orantes; Per Hegna	6; 0	6; 1	6; 1
3	(Spain) (Norway)	José Higueras / Manuel Orantes; Thorvald Moe / Frithjof Prydz	6; 4	6; 3	6; 0
4	(Spain) (Norway)	Manuel Orantes; Thorvald Moe	6; 1	6; 1	6; 1
5	(Spain) (Norway)	José Higueras; Per Hegna	6; 3	6; 3	6; 3

Egypt vs. Great Britain

Egypt
5
Cairo, Egypt
3–5 May 1974
Clay

Great Britain
0

			1	2	3	4	5
1	(Egypt) (United Kingdom)	Ismail El Shafei; David Lloyd	6; 1	6; 4	6; 3
2	(Egypt) (United Kingdom)	Aly El Dawoudi; John Lloyd	7; 5	7; 5	4; 6	4; 6	6; 2
3	(Egypt) (United Kingdom)	Aly El Dawoudi / Ismail El Shafei; David Lloyd / John Lloyd	10; 8	6; 4	6; 4
4	(Egypt) (United Kingdom)	Aly El Dawoudi; David Lloyd	8; 6	6; 3	6; 4
5	(Egypt) (United Kingdom)	Ismail El Shafei; John Lloyd	6; 1	8; 6	6; 1

Belgium vs. Yugoslavia

Belgium
2
Brussels, Belgium
3–5 May 1974

Yugoslavia
3

			1	2	3	4	5
1	(Belgium) (Socialist Federal Republic of Yugoslavia)	Patrick Hombergen; Željko Franulović	6; 3	3; 6	2; 6	6; 3	8; 10
2	(Belgium) (Socialist Federal Republic of Yugoslavia)	Bernard Mignot; Nikola Pilić	6; 8	2; 6	2; 6
3	(Belgium) (Socialist Federal Republic of Yugoslavia)	Patrick Hombergen / Bernard Mignot; Željko Franulović / Nikola Pilić	6; 8	6; 3	9; 7	7; 5
4	(Belgium) (Socialist Federal Republic of Yugoslavia)	Bernard Mignot; Željko Franulović	6; 4	6; 1	1; 6	6; 3
5	(Belgium) (Socialist Federal Republic of Yugoslavia)	Patrick Hombergen; Nikola Pilić	5; 7	6; 8	6; 3	2; 6

=== Main Draw ===
==== Draw ====
Quarterfinals; 10–12 May
Czechoslovakia
bye
Düsseldorf, West Germany
West Germany	3
Spain	2
Cairo, Egypt
Egypt	2
Yugoslavia	3
bye
Soviet Union

Semifinals; 19–21 July
Munich, West Germany (clay)
Czechoslovakia	3
West Germany	2
Donetsk, Soviet Union
Yugoslavia	1
Soviet Union	3

Final; 26–28 July
Donetsk, Soviet Union (clay)
Czechoslovakia	2
Soviet Union	3

==== Quarterfinals ====
West Germany vs. Spain

West Germany
3
Düsseldorf, West Germany
10–12 May 1974

Spain
2

			1	2	3	4	5
1	(West Germany) (Spain)	Karl Meiler; Manuel Orantes	3; 6	4; 6	6; 4	6; 4	6; 3
2	(West Germany) (Spain)	Jürgen Fassbender; José Higueras	6; 8	3; 6	6; 2	3; 6
3	(West Germany) (Spain)	Jürgen Fassbender / Hans-Jürgen Pohmann; Antonio Muñoz / Manuel Orantes	6; 3	6; 4	4; 6	6; 4
4	(West Germany) (Spain)	Karl Meiler; José Higueras	6; 3	6; 2	6; 1
5	(West Germany) (Spain)	Jürgen Fassbender; Manuel Orantes	4; 6	2; 6	0; 6

Egypt vs. Yugoslavia

Egypt
2
Cairo, Egypt
10–12 May 1974

Yugoslavia
3

			1	2	3	4	5
1	(Egypt) (Socialist Federal Republic of Yugoslavia)	Ismail El Shafei; Željko Franulović	6; 2	6; 3	6; 2
2	(Egypt) (Socialist Federal Republic of Yugoslavia)	Aly El Dawoudi; Nikola Pilić	0; 6	4; 6	0; 6
3	(Egypt) (Socialist Federal Republic of Yugoslavia)	Aly El Dawoudi / Ismail El Shafei; Željko Franulović / Nikola Pilić	3; 6	1; 6	0; 6
4	(Egypt) (Socialist Federal Republic of Yugoslavia)	Ismail El Shafei; Nikola Pilić	2; 6	9; 7	2; 6	6; 3		retired
5	(Egypt) (Socialist Federal Republic of Yugoslavia)	Aly El Dawoudi; Željko Franulović	2; 6	5; 7	3; 6

==== Semifinals ====
West Germany vs. Czechoslovakia

West Germany
2
Munich, West Germany
19–21 July 1974
Clay

Czechoslovakia
3

			1	2	3	4	5
1	(West Germany) (Czechoslovakia)	Hans-Jürgen Pohmann; Jan Kodeš	4; 6	1; 6	3; 6
2	(West Germany) (Czechoslovakia)	Karl Meiler; Jiří Hřebec	6; 3	1; 6	3; 6	13; 11	6; 4
3	(West Germany) (Czechoslovakia)	Jürgen Fassbender / Hans-Jürgen Pohmann; Jan Kodeš / Vladimír Zedník	6; 4	6; 0	6; 2
4	(West Germany) (Czechoslovakia)	Karl Meiler; Jan Kodeš	1; 6	5; 7	0; 6
5	(West Germany) (Czechoslovakia)	Hans-Jürgen Pohmann; Jiří Hřebec	4; 6	1; 6	8; 6	10; 12

Soviet Union vs. Yugoslavia

Soviet Union
3
Donetsk, Soviet Union
19–21 July 1974

Yugoslavia
1

			1	2	3	4	5
1	(Soviet Union) (Socialist Federal Republic of Yugoslavia)	Alex Metreveli; Boro Jovanović	6; 4	6; 1	6; 1
2	(Soviet Union) (Socialist Federal Republic of Yugoslavia)	Teimuraz Kakulia; Nikola Pilić	7; 5	6; 8	5; 7	1; 6
3	(Soviet Union) (Socialist Federal Republic of Yugoslavia)	Vladimir Korotkov / Alex Metreveli; Boro Jovanović / Nikola Pilić	6; 1	6; 1	3; 6	6; 3
4	(Soviet Union) (Socialist Federal Republic of Yugoslavia)	Teimuraz Kakulia; Boro Jovanović	6; 2	6; 4	6; 0
5	(Soviet Union) (Socialist Federal Republic of Yugoslavia)	Alex Metreveli; Nikola Pilić						not played

==== Final ====
Soviet Union vs. Czechoslovakia

Soviet Union
3
Donetsk, Soviet Union
26–28 July 1974
Clay

Czechoslovakia
2

			1	2	3	4	5
1	(Soviet Union) (Czechoslovakia)	Alex Metreveli; František Pála	6; 2	6; 4	3; 6	6; 2
2	(Soviet Union) (Czechoslovakia)	Teimuraz Kakulia; Jan Kodeš	4; 6	2; 6	3; 6
3	(Soviet Union) (Czechoslovakia)	Vladimir Korotkov / Alex Metreveli; Jan Kodeš / Vladimír Zedník	4; 6	1; 6	3; 6
4	(Soviet Union) (Czechoslovakia)	Alex Metreveli; Jan Kodeš	4; 6	6; 3	4; 6	6; 3	7; 5
5	(Soviet Union) (Czechoslovakia)	Teimuraz Kakulia; František Pála	6; 3	4; 6	6; 4	2; 6	6; 4
