= 1973 Davis Cup Europe Zone =

International tennis competition

The Europe Zone was one of the three regional zones of the 1973 Davis Cup.

31 teams entered the Europe Zone, competing across 2 sub-zones. 14 teams competed in the preliminary rounds, with the winners progressing to the main draw and joining the remaining 17 teams. The winners of each sub-zone went on to compete in the Inter-Zonal Zone against the winners of the Americas Zone and Eastern Zone.

Romania defeated the Soviet Union in the Zone A final, and Czechoslovakia defeated Italy in the Zone B final, resulting in both Romania and Czechoslovakia progressing to the Inter-Zonal Zone.

== Zone A ==
=== Preliminary round ===
==== Draw ====
Preliminary round 13–22 April
Vienna, Austria
Austria	3
Monaco	0
Dublin, Ireland (indoor hard)
Ireland	0
Norway	5
Athens, Greece
Greece	3
Finland	2

==== Results ====
Austria vs. Monaco

Austria
3
Vienna, Austria
20–22 April 1973

Monaco
0

			1	2	3	4	5
1	(Austria) (Monaco)	Peter Pokorny; Louis Borfiga	6; 0	6; 3	5; 7	4; 6	7; 5
2	(Austria) (Monaco)	Hans Kary; Emmanuel van der Pol	6; 3	6; 2	6; 4
3	(Austria) (Monaco)	Ernst Walter / Gerhard Wimmer; Bernard Balleret / Louis Borfiga	6; 4	4; 6	6; 1	6; 2
4	(Austria) (Monaco)	Peter Pokorny; Emmanuel van der Pol						not played
5	(Austria) (Monaco)	Hans Kary; Louis Borfiga						not played

Ireland vs. Norway

Ireland
0
Dublin, Ireland
13–15 April 1973
Hard (indoors)

Norway
5

			1	2	3	4	5
1	(Republic of Ireland) (Norway)	Michael Hickey; Erik Melander	5; 7	2; 6	4; 6
2	(Republic of Ireland) (Norway)	William Brown; Per Hegna	5; 7	0; 6	0; 6
3	(Republic of Ireland) (Norway)	William Brown / Michael Hickey; Erik Melander / Thorvald Moe	6; 2	1; 6	22; 20	4; 6	4; 6
4	(Republic of Ireland) (Norway)	Peter Ledbetter; Finn Dag Jagge	6; 1	3; 6	0; 6	2; 6
5	(Republic of Ireland) (Norway)	Peter Jackson; Per Hegna	4; 6	5; 7	2; 6

Greece vs. Finland

Greece
3
Athens, Greece
13–15 April 1973

Finland
2

			1	2	3	4	5
1	(Greece) (Finland)	Nicholas Kalogeropoulos; George Berner	2; 6	8; 6	6; 4	1; 6	6; 2
2	(Greece) (Finland)	Nicolas Kelaidis; Matti Timonen	3; 6	3; 6	5; 7
3	(Greece) (Finland)	Nicholas Kalogeropoulos / Nicolas Kelaidis; Pekka Säilä / Matti Timonen	8; 6	2; 6	6; 3	3; 6	9; 7
4	(Greece) (Finland)	Nicolas Kelaidis; George Berner	2; 6	2; 6	3; 6
5	(Greece) (Finland)	Nicholas Kalogeropoulos; Matti Timonen	7; 5	12; 10	6; 2

=== Main Draw ===
==== Draw ====
First Round; 3–6 May
Tel Aviv, Israel (hard)
Israel	1
Netherlands	4
Vienna, Austria
Austria	2
New Zealand	3
Oslo, Norway (clay)
Norway	3
Denmark	2
Athens, Greece
Greece	1
Hungary	4

Quarterfinals; 18–20 May
Scheveningen, Netherlands (clay)
Romania	3
Netherlands	2
Zagreb, Yugoslavia
Yugoslavia	2
New Zealand	3
Oslo, Norway (clay)
Norway	0
France	5
Budapest, Hungary
Hungary	2
Soviet Union	3

Semifinals; 20–22 July
Bucharest, Romania (clay)
Romania	4
New Zealand	1
Moscow, Soviet Union
France	2
Soviet Union	3

Final; 3–5 August
Bucharest, Romania
Romania	3
Soviet Union	2

==== First round ====
Israel vs. Netherlands

Israel
1
Tel Aviv, Israel
3–5 May 1973
Hard

Netherlands
4

			1	2	3	4	5
1	(Israel) (Netherlands)	Ron Lehrner; Niklaus Fleury	1; 6	4; 6	7; 9
2	(Israel) (Netherlands)	Yehoshua Shalem; Jan Hordijk	1; 6	0; 6	2; 6
3	(Israel) (Netherlands)	Josef Stabholz / Yair Wertheimer; Niklaus Fleury / Jan Hordijk	8; 10	4; 6	2; 6
4	(Israel) (Netherlands)	Yehoshua Shalem; Niklaus Fleury	5; 7	7; 5	8; 6	6; 2
5	(Israel) (Netherlands)	Ron Lehrner; Jan Hordijk	3; 6	1; 6	4; 6

Austria vs. New Zealand

Austria
2
Vienna, Austria
4–6 May 1973

New Zealand
3

			1	2	3	4	5
1	(Austria) (New Zealand)	Hans Kary; Onny Parun	3; 6	2; 6	6; 3	6; 3	6; 1
2	(Austria) (New Zealand)	Peter Pokorny; Brian Fairlie	1; 6	3; 6	6; 3	0; 6
3	(Austria) (New Zealand)	Hans Kary / Peter Pokorny; Brian Fairlie / Onny Parun	1; 6	2; 6	4; 6
4	(Austria) (New Zealand)	Peter Pokorny; Onny Parun	4; 6	1; 6	3; 6
5	(Austria) (New Zealand)	Hans Kary; Brian Fairlie	6; 4	6; 3	6; 3

Norway vs. Denmark

Norway
3
Oslo, Norway
4–6 May 1973
Clay

Denmark
2

			1	2	3	4	5
1	(Norway) (Denmark)	Per Hegna; Lars Elvstrøm	7; 5	6; 4	6; 2
2	(Norway) (Denmark)	Erik Melander; Tom Christensen	6; 3	6; 4	9; 11	6; 3
3	(Norway) (Denmark)	Thorvald Moe / Jon-Erik Ross; Tom Christensen / Lars Elvstrøm	6; 8	5; 7	6; 3	3; 6
4	(Norway) (Denmark)	Erik Melander; Lars Elvstrøm	6; 2	6; 4	3; 6	4; 6	2; 6
5	(Norway) (Denmark)	Per Hegna; Tom Christensen	5; 7	6; 1	6; 3	6; 2

Greece vs. Hungary

Greece
1
Athens, Greece
4–6 May 1973

Hungary
4

			1	2	3	4	5
1	(Greece) (Hungary)	Nicholas Kalogeropoulos; Balázs Taróczy	1; 6	7; 5	6; 8	6; 8
2	(Greece) (Hungary)	Nicolas Kelaidis; Szabolcs Baranyi	4; 6	0; 6	1; 6
3	(Greece) (Hungary)	Nicholas Kalogeropoulos / Nicolas Kelaidis; Róbert Machán / Balázs Taróczy	4; 6	1; 6	7; 9
4	(Greece) (Hungary)	Nicholas Kalogeropoulos; Szabolcs Baranyi	6; 1	7; 5	6; 4
5	(Greece) (Hungary)	Nicolas Kelaidis; Balázs Taróczy	1; 6	8; 6	2; 6	3; 6

==== Quarterfinals ====
Netherlands vs. Romania

Netherlands
2
Scheveningen, Netherlands
18–20 May 1973
Clay

Romania
3

			1	2	3	4	5
1	(Netherlands) (Romania)	Tom Okker; Toma Ovici	5; 7	6; 2	6; 1	6; 1
2	(Netherlands) (Romania)	Jan Hordijk; Ilie Năstase	3; 6	3; 6	2; 6
3	(Netherlands) (Romania)	Jan Hordijk / Tom Okker; Dumitru Hărădău / Ilie Năstase	8; 6	6; 1	6; 1
4	(Netherlands) (Romania)	Niklaus Fleury; Toma Ovici	2; 6	3; 6	4; 6
5	(Netherlands) (Romania)	Tom Okker; Ilie Năstase	4; 6	2; 6	4; 6

Yugoslavia vs. New Zealand

Yugoslavia
2
Zagreb, Yugoslavia
18–20 May 1973

New Zealand
3

			1	2	3	4	5
1	(Socialist Federal Republic of Yugoslavia) (New Zealand)	Boro Jovanović; Onny Parun	6; 1	3; 6	2; 6	2; 6
2	(Socialist Federal Republic of Yugoslavia) (New Zealand)	Željko Franulović; Brian Fairlie	6; 2	6; 8	2; 6	6; 2	6; 1
3	(Socialist Federal Republic of Yugoslavia) (New Zealand)	Željko Franulović / Boro Jovanović; Brian Fairlie / Onny Parun	0; 6	3; 6	4; 6
4	(Socialist Federal Republic of Yugoslavia) (New Zealand)	Željko Franulović; Onny Parun	3; 6	6; 4	2; 6	2; 6
5	(Socialist Federal Republic of Yugoslavia) (New Zealand)	Boro Jovanović; Brian Fairlie	6; 3	6; 2	6; 0

Norway vs. France

Norway
0
Oslo, Norway
18–20 May 1973
Clay

France
5

			1	2	3	4	5
1	(Norway) (France)	Per Hegna; Patrick Proisy	1; 6	1; 6	2; 6
2	(Norway) (France)	Erik Melander; François Jauffret	0; 6	3; 6	2; 6
3	(Norway) (France)	Erik Melander / Thorvald Moe; Jean-Baptiste Chanfreau / Wanaro N'Godrella	5; 7	3; 6	5; 7
4	(Norway) (France)	Erik Melander; Patrick Proisy	0; 6	0; 6	3; 6
5	(Norway) (France)	Per Hegna; François Jauffret	0; 6	3; 6	2; 6

Hungary vs. Soviet Union

Hungary
2
Budapest, Hungary
18–20 May 1973

Soviet Union
3

			1	2	3	4	5
1	(Hungary) (Soviet Union)	Balázs Taróczy; Teimuraz Kakulia	6; 1	0; 6	8; 6	5; 7	5; 7
2	(Hungary) (Soviet Union)	Szabolcs Baranyi; Alex Metreveli	2; 6	2; 6	4; 6
3	(Hungary) (Soviet Union)	Róbert Machán / Balázs Taróczy; Sergei Likhachev / Alex Metreveli	10; 8	6; 2	2; 6	6; 0
4	(Hungary) (Soviet Union)	Balázs Taróczy; Alex Metreveli	4; 6	4; 6	3; 6
5	(Hungary) (Soviet Union)	Szabolcs Baranyi; Teimuraz Kakulia	4; 6					retired

==== Semifinals ====
Romania vs. New Zealand

Romania
4
Bucharest, Romania
20–22 July 1973
Clay

New Zealand
1

			1	2	3	4	5
1	(Romania) (New Zealand)	Toma Ovici; Brian Fairlie	6; 1	3; 6	3; 6	6; 0	6; 2
2	(Romania) (New Zealand)	Ilie Năstase; Onny Parun	6; 1	8; 6	6; 2
3	(Romania) (New Zealand)	Ilie Năstase / Ionel Sânteiu; Brian Fairlie / Onny Parun	6; 1	8; 6	6; 3
4	(Romania) (New Zealand)	Ilie Năstase; Brian Fairlie	4; 6	6; 0	6; 3	6; 0
5	(Romania) (New Zealand)	Toma Ovici; Onny Parun	3; 6	5; 7	2; 6

Soviet Union vs. France

Soviet Union
3
Moscow, Soviet Union
20–22 July 1973

France
2

			1	2	3	4	5
1	(Soviet Union) (France)	Teimuraz Kakulia; François Jauffret	4; 6	4; 6	4; 6
2	(Soviet Union) (France)	Alex Metreveli; Patrick Proisy	6; 3	6; 8	7; 5	6; 2
3	(Soviet Union) (France)	Sergei Likhachev / Alex Metreveli; Pierre Barthès / François Jauffret	4; 6	5; 7	9; 11
4	(Soviet Union) (France)	Teimuraz Kakulia; Patrick Proisy	6; 3	6; 3	6; 4
5	(Soviet Union) (France)	Alex Metreveli; François Jauffret	6; 1	6; 3	4; 6	4; 6	6; 4

==== Final ====
Romania vs. Soviet Union

Romania
3
Bucharest, Romania
3–5 August 1973
Clay

Soviet Union
2

			1	2	3	4	5
1	(Romania) (Soviet Union)	Toma Ovici; Alex Metreveli	5; 7	5; 7	2; 6
2	(Romania) (Soviet Union)	Ilie Năstase; Teimuraz Kakulia	6; 0	6; 3	6; 0
3	(Romania) (Soviet Union)	Ilie Năstase / Ionel Sânteiu; Sergei Likhachev / Alex Metreveli	0; 6	6; 3	4; 6	7; 5	2; 6
4	(Romania) (Soviet Union)	Ilie Năstase; Alex Metreveli	6; 0	6; 2	6; 4
5	(Romania) (Soviet Union)	Toma Ovici; Teimuraz Kakulia	6; 3	6; 3	6; 1

== Zone B ==
=== Preliminary round ===
==== Draw ====
Preliminary round 10–12 November 1972; 6–22 April
Cairo, Egypt
Egypt	5
Turkey	0
Lisbon, Portugal (clay)
Portugal	0
Switzerland	5
Sofia, Bulgaria
Bulgaria	5
Iran	0
Casablanca, Morocco
Morocco	5
Luxembourg	0

==== Results ====
Egypt vs. Turkey

Egypt
5
Cairo, Egypt
20–22 April 1973

Turkey
0

			1	2	3	4	5
1	(Egypt) (Turkey)	Aly El Dawoudi; Arif Koçak	8; 6	6; 2	6; 0
2	(Egypt) (Turkey)	Ibrahim Mahmoud; Bülent Altınkaya	6; 3	6; 1	6; 0
3	(Egypt) (Turkey)	Aly El Dawoudi / Ibrahim Mahmoud; Bülent Altınkaya / Hasan Özdemir	6; 0	6; 2	6; 3
4	(Egypt) (Turkey)	Ahmed Hassan; Bülent Altınkaya	6; 3	6; 3	6; 3
5	(Egypt) (Turkey)	Moataz El Sonbol; Arif Koçak	6; 2	6; 3	6; 1

Portugal vs. Switzerland

Portugal
0
Estádio Nacional, Lisbon, Portugal
6–8 April 1973
Clay

Switzerland
5

			1	2	3	4	5
1	(Portugal) (Switzerland)	Raúl Peralta; Petr Kanderal	2; 6	3; 6	0; 6
2	(Portugal) (Switzerland)	Alfredo Vaz Pinto; Dimitri Sturdza	6; 4	1; 6	5; 7	6; 8
3	(Portugal) (Switzerland)	Raúl Peralta / Alfredo Vaz Pinto; Dimitri Sturdza / Matthias Werren	2; 6	2; 6	8; 10
4	(Portugal) (Switzerland)	Alfredo Vaz Pinto; Petr Kanderal	6; 8	2; 6	3; 6
5	(Portugal) (Switzerland)	José Vilela; Dimitri Sturdza	3; 6	3; 6	3; 6

Bulgaria vs. Iran

Bulgaria
5
Sofia, Bulgaria
20–22 April 1973

Iran
0

			1	2	3	4	5
1	(Bulgaria) (Iran)	Bozhidar Pampoulov; Taghi Akbari	6; 4	6; 2	4; 6	8; 10	6; 3
2	(Bulgaria) (Iran)	Ljuben Genov; Hussain Akbari	6; 2	8; 6	6; 2
3	(Bulgaria) (Iran)	Bozhidar Pampoulov / Matei Pampoulov; Hussain Akbari / Taghi Akbari	6; 2	6; 3	6; 4
4	(Bulgaria) (Iran)	Bozhidar Pampoulov; Hussain Akbari	6; 0	6; 3	11; 9
5	(Bulgaria) (Iran)	Ljuben Genov; Taghi Akbari	6; 4	6; 4	6; 4

Morocco vs. Luxembourg

Morocco
5
Casablanca, Morocco
10–12 November 1972

Luxembourg
0

			1	2	3	4	5
1	(Morocco) (Luxembourg)	Ahmed Ben Omar; Jean Brucher	6; 1	6; 0	6; 2
2	(Morocco) (Luxembourg)	Omar Laimina; Jean Neuman	8; 6	6; 1	2; 6	6; 4
3	(Morocco) (Luxembourg)	Mohammed-Haibabi Bouchaib / Omar Laimina; Jean Brucher / Jean Neuman	6; 1	6; 4	8; 6
4	(Morocco) (Luxembourg)	Mohammed-Haibabi Bouchaib; Jean Neuman	6; 3	6; 4	4; 6	6; 3
5	(Morocco) (Luxembourg)	Mohammed-Chinois El Achraoui; Jean Brucher	6; 3	6; 2	2; 6	6; 4

=== Main Draw ===
==== Draw ====
First Round; 27 April–6 May
Cairo, Egypt
Egypt	4
Poland	1
Geneva, Switzerland
Switzerland	0
West Germany	3
Sofia, Bulgaria
Bulgaria	3
Belgium	2
Rabat, Morocco (clay)
Morocco	1
Sweden	4

Quarterfinals; 18–20 May
Cairo, Egypt (clay)
Czechoslovakia	4
Egypt	1
Munich, West Germany (clay)
Great Britain	1
West Germany	4
Reggio Emilia, Italy (clay)
Bulgaria	0
Italy	5
Båstad, Sweden (clay)
Sweden	2
Spain	3

Semifinals; 20–22 July
Prague, Czechoslovakia (clay)
Czechoslovakia	3
West Germany	2
Turin, Italy (clay)
Italy	3
Spain	2

Final; 3–5 August
Prague, Czechoslovakia (clay)
Czechoslovakia	4
Italy	1

==== First round ====
Egypt vs. Poland

Egypt
4
Cairo, Egypt
4–6 May 1973

Poland
1

			1	2	3	4	5
1	(Egypt) (Poland)	Ibrahim Mahmoud; Tadeusz Nowicki	2; 6	7; 5	6; 3	9; 7
2	(Egypt) (Poland)	Ismail El Shafei; Jacek Niedźwiedzki	6; 3	7; 5	6; 1
3	(Egypt) (Poland)	Aly El Dawoudi / Ismail El Shafei; Jacek Niedźwiedzki / Tadeusz Nowicki	6; 1	7; 5	4; 6	3; 6	6; 3
4	(Egypt) (Poland)	Aly El Dawoudi; Wojciech Fibak	1; 6	5; 7	6; 3	7; 5	1; 6
5	(Egypt) (Poland)	Ibrahim Mahmoud; Jacek Niedźwiedzki	4; 6					retired

Switzerland vs. West Germany

Switzerland
0
Geneva, Switzerland
27–29 April 1973

West Germany
3

			1	2	3	4	5
1	(Switzerland) (West Germany)	Dimitri Sturdza; Jürgen Fassbender	6; 0	3; 6	2; 6	2; 6
2	(Switzerland) (West Germany)	Petr Kanderal; Harald Elschenbroich	7; 9	4; 6	5; 7
3	(Switzerland) (West Germany)	Dimitri Sturdza / Matthias Werren; Jürgen Fassbender / Hans-Jürgen Pohmann	4; 6	16; 18	4; 6
4	(Switzerland) (West Germany)	Petr Kanderal; Jürgen Fassbender						not played
5	(Switzerland) (West Germany)	Dimitri Sturdza; Harald Elschenbroich						not played

Bulgaria vs. Belgium

Bulgaria
3
Sofia, Bulgaria
4–6 May 1973

Belgium
2

			1	2	3	4	5
1	(Bulgaria) (Belgium)	Matei Pampoulov; Patrick Hombergen	5; 7	3; 6	7; 9
2	(Bulgaria) (Belgium)	Ljuben Genov; Bernard Mignot	6; 3	2; 6	1; 6	2; 6
3	(Bulgaria) (Belgium)	Bozhidar Pampoulov / Matei Pampoulov; Patrick Hombergen / Bernard Mignot	5; 7	6; 3	7; 5	6; 4
4	(Bulgaria) (Belgium)	Bozhidar Pampoulov; Bernard Mignot	6; 4	9; 7	6; 2
5	(Bulgaria) (Belgium)	Ljuben Genov; Patrick Hombergen	5; 7	6; 2	3; 6	12; 10	6; 3

Morocco vs. Sweden

Morocco
1
Rabat, Morocco
4–6 May 1973
Clay

Sweden
4

			1	2	3	4	5
1	(Morocco) (Sweden)	Omar Laimina; Björn Borg	3; 6	2; 6	1; 6
2	(Morocco) (Sweden)	Ahmed Ben Omar; Kjell Johansson	0; 6	4; 6	4; 6
3	(Morocco) (Sweden)	Ahmed Ben Omar / Omar Laimina; Ove Bengtson / Björn Borg	5; 7	2; 6	1; 6
4	(Morocco) (Sweden)	Ahmed Ben Omar; Björn Borg	1; 6	0; 6	1; 6
5	(Morocco) (Sweden)	Omar Laimina; Kjell Johansson	6; 4	6; 0	6; 1

==== Quarterfinals ====
Egypt vs. Czechoslovakia

Egypt
1
Cairo, Egypt
18–20 May 1973
Clay

Czechoslovakia
4

			1	2	3	4	5
1	(Egypt) (Czechoslovakia)	Ibrahim Mahmoud; Jan Kodeš	4; 6	4; 6	1; 6
2	(Egypt) (Czechoslovakia)	Ismail El Shafei; Jiří Hřebec	6; 8	4; 6	6; 3	6; 3	11; 13
3	(Egypt) (Czechoslovakia)	Aly El Dawoudi / Ismail El Shafei; Jan Kodeš / Jan Kukal	1; 6	4; 6	2; 6
4	(Egypt) (Czechoslovakia)	Aly El Dawoudi; František Pála	1; 6	6; 3	2; 6	6; 4	4; 6
5	(Egypt) (Czechoslovakia)	Ibrahim Mahmoud; Jiří Hřebec	1; 6	8; 6	5; 2			retired

West Germany vs. Great Britain

West Germany
4
Munich, West Germany
18–20 May 1973
Clay

Great Britain
1

			1	2	3	4	5
1	(West Germany) (United Kingdom)	Jürgen Fassbender; Mark Cox	6; 3	6; 4	1; 6	9; 7
2	(West Germany) (United Kingdom)	Karl Meiler; Roger Taylor	6; 3	6; 4	6; 4
3	(West Germany) (United Kingdom)	Jürgen Fassbender / Hans-Jürgen Pohmann; David Lloyd / Roger Taylor	7; 5	4; 6	6; 3	6; 4
4	(West Germany) (United Kingdom)	Jürgen Fassbender; Roger Taylor	6; 4	8; 6	6; 3
5	(West Germany) (United Kingdom)	Karl Meiler; Mark Cox	6; 4	0; 6	4; 6	2; 6

Italy vs. Bulgaria

Italy
5
Reggio Emilia, Italy
18–20 May 1973
Clay

Bulgaria
0

			1	2	3	4	5
1	(Italy) (Bulgaria)	Paolo Bertolucci; Bozhidar Pampoulov	8; 6	6; 1	6; 4
2	(Italy) (Bulgaria)	Adriano Panatta; Ljuben Genov	6; 1	6; 2	6; 3
3	(Italy) (Bulgaria)	Paolo Bertolucci / Adriano Panatta; Bozhidar Pampoulov / Matei Pampoulov	6; 2	7; 5	6; 4
4	(Italy) (Bulgaria)	Paolo Bertolucci; Ljuben Genov	6; 3	6; 3	6; 3
5	(Italy) (Bulgaria)	Adriano Panatta; Bozhidar Pampoulov	6; 4	3; 6	6; 3	6; 3

Sweden vs. Spain

Sweden
2
Båstad Tennis Stadium, Båstad, Sweden
18–20 May 1973
Clay

Spain
3

			1	2	3	4	5
1	(Sweden) (Spain)	Björn Borg; Manuel Orantes	1; 6	2; 6	1; 6
2	(Sweden) (Spain)	Ove Bengtson; Andrés Gimeno	4; 6	4; 6	6; 3	8; 6	1; 6
3	(Sweden) (Spain)	Ove Bengtson / Rolf Norberg; Antonio Muñoz / Manuel Orantes	6; 3	6; 3	6; 8	6; 3
4	(Sweden) (Spain)	Ove Bengtson; Manuel Orantes	6; 8	4; 6	1; 6
5	(Sweden) (Spain)	Björn Borg; Antonio Muñoz	5; 7	6; 3	6; 3	3; 6	7; 5

==== Semifinals ====
Czechoslovakia vs. West Germany

Czechoslovakia
3
Prague, Czechoslovakia
20–22 July 1973
Clay

West Germany
2

			1	2	3	4	5
1	(Czechoslovakia) (West Germany)	Jan Kodeš; Karl Meiler	6; 3	6; 4	6; 1
2	(Czechoslovakia) (West Germany)	Jiří Hřebec; Jürgen Fassbender	6; 1	7; 9	6; 2	6; 3
3	(Czechoslovakia) (West Germany)	Jan Kodeš / Jan Kukal; Jürgen Fassbender / Hans-Jürgen Pohmann	2; 6	6; 3	6; 8	7; 9
4	(Czechoslovakia) (West Germany)	Jan Kodeš; Jürgen Fassbender	6; 2	6; 1	7; 5
5	(Czechoslovakia) (West Germany)	Jiří Hřebec; Karl Meiler	1; 6	1; 6	5; 7

Italy vs. Spain

Italy
3
Turin, Italy
20–22 July 1973
Clay

Spain
2

			1	2	3	4	5
1	(Italy) (Spain)	Corrado Barazzutti; Manuel Santana	7; 5	1; 6	6; 4	6; 4
2	(Italy) (Spain)	Antonio Zugarelli; José Higueras	7; 5	6; 3	6; 2
3	(Italy) (Spain)	Giordano Maioli / Pietro Marzano; Juan Gisbert / José Higueras	3; 6	1; 6	6; 4	4; 6
4	(Italy) (Spain)	Corrado Barazzutti; José Higueras	6; 4	6; 3	6; 1
5	(Italy) (Spain)	Antonio Zugarelli; Manuel Santana	6; 2	3; 6	3; 6	2; 6

==== Final ====
Czechoslovakia vs. Italy

Czechoslovakia
4
Prague, Czechoslovakia
3–5 August 1973
Clay

Italy
1

			1	2	3	4	5
1	(Czechoslovakia) (Italy)	Jan Kodeš; Corrado Barazzutti	5; 7	6; 3	4; 6	6; 2	1; 6
2	(Czechoslovakia) (Italy)	Jiří Hřebec; Antonio Zugarelli	12; 10	6; 1	6; 1
3	(Czechoslovakia) (Italy)	Jan Kodeš / František Pála; Giordano Majoli / Pietro Marzano	6; 2	8; 6	6; 4
4	(Czechoslovakia) (Italy)	Jiří Hřebec; Corrado Barazzutti	9; 7	6; 1	6; 4
5	(Czechoslovakia) (Italy)	Jan Kodeš; Antonio Zugarelli	6; 1	6; 3	0; 6	6; 2
