= 1970 Davis Cup Europe Zone =

International tennis competition

The Europe Zone was one of the three regional zones of the 1970 Davis Cup.

31 teams entered the Europe Zone, competing across 2 sub-zones. The winners of each sub-zone went on to compete in the Inter-Zonal Zone against the winners of the Americas Zone and Eastern Zone.

Spain defeated Yugoslavia in the Zone A final, and West Germany defeated the Soviet Union in the Zone B final, resulting in both Spain and West Germany progressing to the Inter-Zonal Zone.

South Africa were ejected from the tournament on 23 March due to protests over the South African government's apartheid policies.

== Zone A ==
=== Draw ===
First Round; 1–10 May
Tehran, Iran
Romania | 4
Iran | 1
Athens, Greece
Greece | 4
Netherlands | 1
Mondorf-les-Bains, Luxembourg
Luxembourg | 0
Ireland | 3
Maribor, Yugoslavia
Yugoslavia | 3
Poland | 2
Stockholm, Sweden (clay)
Sweden | 0
Spain | 5
Istanbul, Turkey
Turkey | 0
Bulgaria | 5
Geneva, Switzerland
Switzerland | 1
France | 4
Edinburgh, United Kingdom (clay)
Austria | 3
Great Britain | 2

Quarterfinals; 22–25 May
Bucharest, Romania (clay)
Romania | 5
Greece | 0
Dublin, Ireland
Ireland | 0
Yugoslavia | 5
Barcelona, Spain (clay)
Spain | 5
Bulgaria | 0
Paris, France (clay)
France | 5
Austria | 0

Semifinals; 12–15 June
Maribor, Yugoslavia (clay)
Romania | 2
Yugoslavia | 3
Paris, France (clay)
Spain | 5
France | 0

Final; 16–18 July
Barcelona, Spain
Yugoslavia | 1
Spain | 4

=== First round ===
Iran vs. Romania

Iran
1
Tehran, Iran
7–9 May 1970

Romania
4

| | | | 1 | 2 | 3 | 4 | 5 |
|---|---|---|---|---|---|---|---|
| 1 | (Iran) (Romania) | Taghi Akbari; Ilie Năstase | 8; 10 | 0; 6 | 8; 6 | 7; 5 | 3; 6 |
| 2 | (Iran) (Romania) | Hussain Akbari; Ion Țiriac | 0; 6 | 1; 6 | 4; 6 |
| 3 | (Iran) (Romania) | Hussain Akbari / Taghi Akbari; Ilie Năstase / Ion Țiriac | 3; 6 | 6; 3 | 3; 6 | 3; 6 |
| 4 | (Iran) (Romania) | Hussain Akbari; Ilie Năstase | 2; 6 | 6; 4 | 2; 6 | 3; 6 |
| 5 | (Iran) (Romania) | Taghi Akbari; Petre Mărmureanu | 6; 1 | 6; 4 | 6; 3 |

Greece vs. Netherlands

Greece
4
Athens, Greece
8–10 May 1970

Netherlands
1

| | | | 1 | 2 | 3 | 4 | 5 |
|---|---|---|---|---|---|---|---|
| 1 | (Greece) (Netherlands) | Periclis Gavrilidis; Jan Hordijk | 4; 6 | 8; 6 | 1; 6 | 1; 6 |
| 2 | (Greece) (Netherlands) | Nicholas Kalogeropoulos; Pieter Soeters | 7; 5 | 8; 6 | 6; 2 |
| 3 | (Greece) (Netherlands) | Periclis Gavrilidis / Nicholas Kalogeropoulos; Niklaus Fleury / Jan Hordijk | 4; 6 | 6; 2 | 6; 2 | 6; 2 |
| 4 | (Greece) (Netherlands) | Periclis Gavrilidis; Pieter Soeters | 6; 3 | 6; 4 | 6; 2 |
| 5 | (Greece) (Netherlands) | Nicholas Kalogeropoulos; Jan Hordijk | 6; 1 | 6; 2 | 6; 4 |

Luxembourg vs. Ireland

Luxembourg
0
Mondorf-les-Bains, Luxembourg
1–3 May 1970

Ireland
3

| | | | 1 | 2 | 3 | 4 | 5 |
|---|---|---|---|---|---|---|---|---|
| 1 | (Luxembourg) (Republic of Ireland) | Georges Logelin; Peter Jackson | 6; 4 | 8; 6 | 5; 7 | 1; 6 | 2; 6 |
| 2 | (Luxembourg) (Republic of Ireland) | Thierry Brasseur; William Brown | 6; 3 | 4; 6 | 4; 6 | 11; 9 | 4; 6 |
| 3 | (Luxembourg) (Republic of Ireland) | Thierry Brasseur / Georges Logelin; William Brown / John McGrath | 1; 6 | 1; 6 | 1; 6 |
| 4 | (Luxembourg) (Republic of Ireland) | Thierry Brasseur; Peter Jackson | | | | | | not played |
| 5 | (Luxembourg) (Republic of Ireland) | Georges Logelin; William Brown | | | | | | not played |

Yugoslavia vs. Poland

Yugoslavia
3
Maribor, Yugoslavia
7–9 May 1970

Poland
2

| | | | 1 | 2 | 3 | 4 | 5 |
|---|---|---|---|---|---|---|---|
| 1 | (Socialist Federal Republic of Yugoslavia) (Poland) | Nikola Špear; Mieczysław Rybarczyk | 6; 0 | 3; 6 | 6; 0 | 6; 2 |
| 2 | (Socialist Federal Republic of Yugoslavia) (Poland) | Željko Franulović; Wiesław Gąsiorek | 4; 6 | 6; 2 | 2; 6 | 6; 3 | 6; 2 |
| 3 | (Socialist Federal Republic of Yugoslavia) (Poland) | Željko Franulović / Nikola Špear; Tadeusz Nowicki / Mieczysław Rybarczyk | 4; 6 | 6; 3 | 3; 6 | 6; 1 | 3; 6 |
| 4 | (Socialist Federal Republic of Yugoslavia) (Poland) | Željko Franulović; Mieczysław Rybarczyk | 6; 1 | 6; 1 | 6; 2 |
| 5 | (Socialist Federal Republic of Yugoslavia) (Poland) | Nikola Špear; Wiesław Gąsiorek | 6; 8 | 6; 4 | 4; 6 | 6; 2 | 1; 6 |

Sweden vs. Spain

Sweden
0
Kungliga tennishallen, Stockholm, Sweden
8–10 May 1970
Clay

Spain
5

| | | | 1 | 2 | 3 | 4 | 5 |
|---|---|---|---|---|---|---|---|
| 1 | (Sweden) (Spain) | Ove Bengtson; Manuel Orantes | 5; 7 | 4; 6 | 4; 6 |
| 2 | (Sweden) (Spain) | Jan-Erik Lundqvist; Manuel Santana | 2; 6 | 4; 6 | 6; 4 | 0; 6 |
| 3 | (Sweden) (Spain) | Ove Bengtson / Hans Nerell; Juan Gisbert / Manuel Orantes | 8; 10 | 3; 6 | 6; 8 |
| 4 | (Sweden) (Spain) | Ove Bengtson; Manuel Santana | 9; 11 | 6; 4 | 4; 6 | 2; 6 |
| 5 | (Sweden) (Spain) | Jan-Erik Lundqvist; Juan Gisbert | 6; 4 | 2; 6 | 0; 6 | 0; 6 |

Turkey vs. Bulgaria

Turkey
0
Istanbul, Turkey
8–10 May 1970

Bulgaria
5

| | | | 1 | 2 | 3 | 4 | 5 |
|---|---|---|---|---|---|---|---|
| 1 | (Turkey) (Bulgaria) | Tahsin Gürsoy; Stojan Velev | 3; 6 | 2; 6 | 6; 4 | 0; 6 |
| 2 | (Turkey) (Bulgaria) | Remzi Aydın; Kiril Yashmakov | 3; 6 | 0; 6 | 2; 6 |
| 3 | (Turkey) (Bulgaria) | Remzi Aydın / Tahsin Gürsoy; Stojan Velev / Kiril Yashmakov | 3; 6 | 4; 6 | 6; 4 | 2; 6 |
| 4 | (Turkey) (Bulgaria) | Tahsin Gürsoy; Ljuben Genov | 3; 6 | 2; 6 | 1; 6 |
| 5 | (Turkey) (Bulgaria) | Beyazıt Anbar; Stojan Velev | 3; 6 | 1; 6 | 0; 6 |

Switzerland vs. France

Switzerland
1
Geneva, Switzerland
8–10 May 1970

France
4

| | | | 1 | 2 | 3 | 4 | 5 |
|---|---|---|---|---|---|---|---|
| 1 | (Switzerland) (France) | Michel Burgener; François Jauffret | 3; 6 | 6; 4 | 3; 6 | 4; 6 |
| 2 | (Switzerland) (France) | Dimitri Sturdza; Georges Goven | 10; 8 | 7; 5 | 4; 6 | 6; 3 |
| 3 | (Switzerland) (France) | Dimitri Sturdza / Matthias Werren; Jean-Baptiste Chanfreau / Jean-Loup Rouyer | 11; 9 | 2; 6 | 3; 6 | 1; 6 |
| 4 | (Switzerland) (France) | Michel Burgener; Georges Goven | 1; 6 | 7; 5 | 3; 6 | 4; 6 |
| 5 | (Switzerland) (France) | Dimitri Sturdza; François Jauffret | 3; 6 | 4; 6 | 3; 6 |

Great Britain vs. Austria

Great Britain
2
Thistle Lawn Tennis Club, Edinburgh, United Kingdom
7–9 May 1970
Clay

Austria
3

| | | | 1 | 2 | 3 | 4 | 5 |
|---|---|---|---|---|---|---|---|
| 1 | (United Kingdom) (Austria) | John Clifton; Peter Pokorny | 1; 6 | 6; 4 | 6; 8 | 1; 6 |
| 2 | (United Kingdom) (Austria) | Gerald Battrick; Hans Kary | 5; 7 | 3; 6 | 1; 6 |
| 3 | (United Kingdom) (Austria) | Gerald Battrick / Peter Curtis; Rudolf Hoskowetz / Peter Pokorny | 2; 6 | 8; 6 | 6; 4 | 6; 0 |
| 4 | (United Kingdom) (Austria) | Gerald Battrick; Peter Pokorny | 6; 4 | 6; 2 | 9; 7 |
| 5 | (United Kingdom) (Austria) | John Clifton; Hans Kary | 3; 6 | 2; 6 | 4; 6 |

=== Quarterfinals ===
Romania vs. Greece

Romania
5
Bucharest, Romania
22–25 May 1970
Clay

Greece
0

| | | | 1 | 2 | 3 | 4 | 5 |
|---|---|---|---|---|---|---|---|
| 1 | (Romania) (Greece) | Ilie Năstase; Nicholas Kalogeropoulos | 6; 2 | 7; 5 | 6; 4 |
| 2 | (Romania) (Greece) | Ion Țiriac; Periclis Gavrilidis | 6; 0 | 6; 1 | 6; 0 |
| 3 | (Romania) (Greece) | Ilie Năstase / Ion Țiriac; Epaminondas Argyriou / Nicholas Kalogeropoulos | 6; 4 | 6; 1 | 6; 2 |
| 4 | (Romania) (Greece) | Viorel Marcu; Epaminondas Argyriou | 6; 1 | 6; 3 | 6; 4 |
| 5 | (Romania) (Greece) | Sever Mureșan; Periclis Gavrilidis | 8; 6 | 3; 6 | 6; 2 | 6; 3 |

Ireland vs. Yugoslavia

Ireland
0
Dublin, Ireland
22–24 May 1970

Yugoslavia
5

| | | | 1 | 2 | 3 | 4 | 5 |
|---|---|---|---|---|---|---|---|
| 1 | (Republic of Ireland) (Socialist Federal Republic of Yugoslavia) | William Brown; Nikola Špear | 3; 6 | 2; 6 | 4; 6 |
| 2 | (Republic of Ireland) (Socialist Federal Republic of Yugoslavia) | Peter Jackson; Željko Franulović | 2; 6 | 3; 6 | 6; 3 | 6; 3 | 3; 6 |
| 3 | (Republic of Ireland) (Socialist Federal Republic of Yugoslavia) | William Brown / John McGrath; Željko Franulović / Nikola Špear | 1; 6 | 5; 7 | 4; 6 |
| 4 | (Republic of Ireland) (Socialist Federal Republic of Yugoslavia) | William Brown; Željko Franulović | 3; 6 | 1; 6 | 3; 6 |
| 5 | (Republic of Ireland) (Socialist Federal Republic of Yugoslavia) | Peter Jackson; Nikola Špear | 5; 7 | 1; 6 | 1; 6 |

Spain vs. Bulgaria

Spain
5
Barcelona, Spain
22–24 May 1970
Clay

Bulgaria
0

| | | | 1 | 2 | 3 | 4 | 5 |
|---|---|---|---|---|---|---|---|
| 1 | (Spain) (Bulgaria) | Manuel Santana; Kiril Yashmakov | 6; 1 | 6; 1 | 7; 5 |
| 2 | (Spain) (Bulgaria) | Juan Gisbert; Ljuben Genov | 6; 2 | 6; 2 | 6; 2 |
| 3 | (Spain) (Bulgaria) | Juan Gisbert / Manuel Orantes; Bozhidar Pampoulov / Stojan Velev | 6; 4 | 8; 6 | 6; 2 |
| 4 | (Spain) (Bulgaria) | Manuel Santana; Stojan Velev | 6; 0 | 6; 2 | 6; 0 |
| 5 | (Spain) (Bulgaria) | Juan Gisbert; Kiril Yashmakov | 6; 3 | 6; 2 | 6; 0 |

France vs. Austria

France
5
Stade Roland Garros, Paris, France
22–24 May 1970
Clay

Austria
0

| | | | 1 | 2 | 3 | 4 | 5 |
|---|---|---|---|---|---|---|---|
| 1 | (France) (Austria) | Georges Goven; Peter Pokorny | 6; 4 | 6; 1 | 6; 2 |
| 2 | (France) (Austria) | François Jauffret; Hans Kary | 12; 10 | 1; 6 | 6; 3 | 6; 4 |
| 3 | (France) (Austria) | Jean-Baptiste Chanfreau / Jean-Loup Rouyer; Hans Kary / Peter Pokorny | 6; 2 | 6; 4 | 12; 10 |
| 4 | (France) (Austria) | François Jauffret; Peter Pokorny | 6; 3 | 6; 3 | 6; 4 |
| 5 | (France) (Austria) | Georges Goven; Hans Kary | 6; 3 | 6; 3 | 6; 1 |

=== Semifinals ===
Yugoslavia vs. Romania

Yugoslavia
3
Maribor, Yugoslavia
12–15 June 1970
Clay

Romania
2

| | | | 1 | 2 | 3 | 4 | 5 |
|---|---|---|---|---|---|---|---|
| 1 | (Socialist Federal Republic of Yugoslavia) (Romania) | Nikola Špear; Ion Țiriac | 6; 1 | 4; 6 | 4; 6 | 2; 6 |
| 2 | (Socialist Federal Republic of Yugoslavia) (Romania) | Željko Franulović; Ilie Năstase | 6; 3 | 3; 6 | 6; 2 | 6; 1 |
| 3 | (Socialist Federal Republic of Yugoslavia) (Romania) | Željko Franulović / Nikola Špear; Ilie Năstase / Ion Țiriac | 5; 7 | 8; 6 | 1; 6 | 3; 6 |
| 4 | (Socialist Federal Republic of Yugoslavia) (Romania) | Nikola Špear; Ilie Năstase | 7; 5 | 8; 6 | 6; 2 |
| 5 | (Socialist Federal Republic of Yugoslavia) (Romania) | Željko Franulović; Ion Țiriac | 1; 6 | 5; 7 | 6; 4 | 6; 4 | 6; 0 |

France vs. Spain

France
0
Stade Roland Garros, Paris, France
12–14 May 1970
Clay

Spain
5

| | | | 1 | 2 | 3 | 4 | 5 |
|---|---|---|---|---|---|---|---|
| 1 | (France) (Spain) | Georges Goven; Manuel Santana | 1; 6 | 8; 6 | 2; 6 | 6; 2 | 3; 6 |
| 2 | (France) (Spain) | François Jauffret; Manuel Orantes | 6; 3 | 4; 6 | 1; 6 | 2; 6 |
| 3 | (France) (Spain) | Jean-Baptiste Chanfreau / Jean-Loup Rouyer; Juan Gisbert / Manuel Santana | 4; 6 | 4; 6 | 6; 8 |
| 4 | (France) (Spain) | François Jauffret; Manuel Santana | 5; 7 | 3; 6 | 2; 6 |
| 5 | (France) (Spain) | Georges Goven; Manuel Orantes | 2; 6 | 3; 6 | 2; 6 |

=== Final ===
Spain vs. Yugoslavia

Spain
4
Barcelona, Spain
16–18 July 1970

Yugoslavia
1

| | | | 1 | 2 | 3 | 4 | 5 |
|---|---|---|---|---|---|---|---|
| 1 | (Spain) (Socialist Federal Republic of Yugoslavia) | Manuel Orantes; Nikola Špear | 6; 4 | 6; 4 | 6; 2 |
| 2 | (Spain) (Socialist Federal Republic of Yugoslavia) | Manuel Santana; Željko Franulović | 6; 4 | 6; 4 | 1; 6 | 6; 4 |
| 3 | (Spain) (Socialist Federal Republic of Yugoslavia) | Juan Gisbert / Manuel Santana; Željko Franulović / Nikola Špear | 6; 4 | 6; 1 | 6; 2 |
| 4 | (Spain) (Socialist Federal Republic of Yugoslavia) | Manuel Orantes; Željko Franulović | 7; 5 | 6; 4 | 4; 6 | 6; 8 | 2; 6 |
| 5 | (Spain) (Socialist Federal Republic of Yugoslavia) | Manuel Santana; Nikola Špear | 6; 2 | 6; 1 | 7; 5 |

== Zone B ==
=== Draw ===
First Round; 1–24 May
South Africa
bye
Helsinki, Finland
Finland | 1
Belgium | 4
Bad Homburg, West Germany (clay)
West Germany | 4
Denmark | 1
Cairo, Egypt (clay)
Egypt | 3
Norway | 1
Turin, Italy (clay)
Italy | 2
Czechoslovakia | 3
Israel
Rhodesia | w/o
Lisbon, Portugal (clay)
Portugal | 1
Monaco | 4
Budapest, Hungary
Hungary | 2
Soviet Union | 3

Quarterfinals; 22–24 May
South Africa
Belgium | w/o
West Berlin
West Germany | 5
Egypt | 0
Czechoslovakia | w/o
Rhodesia
Monte Carlo, Monaco
Monaco | 0
Soviet Union | 5

Semifinals; 11–14 June
Nuremberg, West Germany
Belgium | 0
West Germany | 5
Moscow, Soviet Union (clay)
Czechoslovakia | 2
Soviet Union | 3

Final; 14–16 July
Düsseldorf, West Germany
West Germany | 3
Soviet Union | 2

=== First round ===
Finland vs. Belgium

Finland
1
Helsinki, Finland
22–24 May 1970

Belgium
4

| | | | 1 | 2 | 3 | 4 | 5 |
|---|---|---|---|---|---|---|---|
| 1 | (Finland) (Belgium) | George Berner; Patrick Hombergen | 4; 6 | 2; 6 | 2; 6 |
| 2 | (Finland) (Belgium) | Pekka Säilä; Eric Drossart | 5; 7 | 6; 2 | 6; 3 | 6; 4 |
| 3 | (Finland) (Belgium) | George Berner / Pekka Säilä; Eric Drossart / Patrick Hombergen | 0; 6 | 6; 4 | 3; 6 | 0; 6 |
| 4 | (Finland) (Belgium) | George Berner; Eric Drossart | 6; 2 | 5; 7 | 3; 6 | 6; 8 |
| 5 | (Finland) (Belgium) | Pekka Säilä; Patrick Hombergen | 4; 6 | 2; 6 | 7; 5 | 6; 3 | 4; 6 |

West Germany vs. Denmark

West Germany
4
Bad Homburg, West Germany
8–10 May 1970
Clay

Denmark
1

| | | | 1 | 2 | 3 | 4 | 5 |
|---|---|---|---|---|---|---|---|
| 1 | (West Germany) (Denmark) | Christian Kuhnke; Jørgen Ulrich | 6; 3 | 6; 2 | 6; 3 |
| 2 | (West Germany) (Denmark) | Wilhelm Bungert; Carl-Edvard Hedelund | 2; 6 | 4; 6 | 6; 3 | 5; 7 |
| 3 | (West Germany) (Denmark) | Ingo Buding / Christian Kuhnke; Carl-Edvard Hedelund / Jørgen Ulrich | 6; 1 | 6; 1 | 6; 4 |
| 4 | (West Germany) (Denmark) | Christian Kuhnke; Carl-Edvard Hedelund | 6; 0 | 7; 5 | 6; 1 |
| 5 | (West Germany) (Denmark) | Wilhelm Bungert; Jørgen Ulrich | 7; 5 | 6; 2 | 2; 6 | 3; 6 | 6; 3 |

Egypt vs. Norway

Egypt
3
Cairo, Egypt
8–10 May 1970
Clay

Norway
1

| | | | 1 | 2 | 3 | 4 | 5 |
|---|---|---|---|---|---|---|---|---|
| 1 | (Egypt) (Norway) | Moataz El Sonbol; Frithjof Prydz | 6; 3 | 6; 1 | 6; 4 |
| 2 | (Egypt) (Norway) | Aly El Dawoudi; Jon-Erik Ross | 6; 1 | 6; 2 | 6; 3 |
| 3 | (Egypt) (Norway) | Aly El Dawoudi / Abdel-Ghani Mohammed; Frithjof Prydz / Jon-Erik Ross | 5; 7 | 6; 2 | 4; 6 | 1; 6 |
| 4 | (Egypt) (Norway) | Aly El Dawoudi; Frithjof Prydz | 7; 9 | 5; 7 | 6; 2 | 9; 7 | 6; 4 |
| 5 | (Egypt) (Norway) | Moataz El Sonbol; Jon-Erik Ross | | | | | | not played |

Italy vs. Czechoslovakia

Italy
2
Turin, Italy
7–11 May 1970
Clay

Czechoslovakia
3

| | | | 1 | 2 | 3 | 4 | 5 |
|---|---|---|---|---|---|---|---|
| 1 | (Italy) (Czechoslovakia) | Massimo Di Domenico; Jan Kodeš | 3; 6 | 6; 1 | 6; 3 | 4; 6 | 4; 6 |
| 2 | (Italy) (Czechoslovakia) | Adriano Panatta; Jan Kukal | 8; 6 | 6; 3 | 6; 3 |
| 3 | (Italy) (Czechoslovakia) | Massimo Di Domenico / Adriano Panatta; Jan Kodeš / Jan Kukal | 6; 4 | 2; 6 | 6; 2 | 3; 6 | 6; 3 |
| 4 | (Italy) (Czechoslovakia) | Massimo Di Domenico; Jan Kukal | 9; 7 | 4; 6 | 5; 7 | 7; 9 |
| 5 | (Italy) (Czechoslovakia) | Adriano Panatta; Jan Kodeš | 3; 6 | 2; 6 | 2; 6 |

Portugal vs. Monaco

Portugal
1
Lisbon, Portugal
1–3 May 1970
Clay

Monaco
4

| | | | 1 | 2 | 3 | 4 | 5 |
|---|---|---|---|---|---|---|---|
| 1 | (Portugal) (Monaco) | Alfredo Vaz Pinto; Patrick Landau | 4; 6 | 2; 6 | 3; 6 |
| 2 | (Portugal) (Monaco) | Raúl Peralta; Francis Truchi | 6; 2 | 6; 0 | 7; 5 |
| 3 | (Portugal) (Monaco) | Manuel Dinis / Raúl Peralta; Patrick Landau / Francis Truchi | 6; 3 | 4; 6 | 5; 7 | 4; 6 |
| 4 | (Portugal) (Monaco) | Alfredo Vaz Pinto; Francis Truchi | 6; 3 | 6; 2 | 8; 10 | 4; 6 | 2; 6 |
| 5 | (Portugal) (Monaco) | Raúl Peralta; Patrick Landau | 4; 6 | 3; 6 | 6; 4 | 2; 6 |

Hungary vs. Soviet Union

Hungary
2
Budapest, Hungary
8–10 May 1970

Soviet Union
3

| | | | 1 | 2 | 3 | 4 | 5 |
|---|---|---|---|---|---|---|---|
| 1 | (Hungary) (Soviet Union) | Szabolcs Baranyi; Vladimir Korotkov | 4; 6 | 6; 3 | 1; 6 | 6; 1 | 6; 3 |
| 2 | (Hungary) (Soviet Union) | István Gulyás; Alex Metreveli | 7; 9 | 2; 6 | 3; 6 |
| 3 | (Hungary) (Soviet Union) | Szabolcs Baranyi / Róbert Machán; Sergei Likhachev / Alex Metreveli | 4; 6 | 6; 4 | 3; 6 | 6; 8 |
| 4 | (Hungary) (Soviet Union) | Szabolcs Baranyi; Alex Metreveli | 4; 6 | 1; 6 | 2; 6 |
| 5 | (Hungary) (Soviet Union) | István Gulyás; Vladimir Korotkov | 6; 3 | 4; 6 | 6; 0 | 6; 4 |

=== Quarterfinals ===
West Germany vs. Egypt

West Germany
5
West Berlin
22–24 May 1970

Egypt
0

| | | | 1 | 2 | 3 | 4 | 5 |
|---|---|---|---|---|---|---|---|
| 1 | (West Germany) (Egypt) | Wilhelm Bungert; Abdel-Ghani Mohammed | 6; 2 | 6; 4 | 1; 6 | 6; 2 |
| 2 | (West Germany) (Egypt) | Christian Kuhnke; Moataz El Sonbol | 6; 0 | 6; 2 | 6; 2 |
| 3 | (West Germany) (Egypt) | Ingo Buding / Christian Kuhnke; Moataz El Sonbol / Abdel-Ghani Mohammed | 6; 0 | 6; 3 | 6; 0 |
| 4 | (West Germany) (Egypt) | Wilhelm Bungert; Moataz El Sonbol | 10; 8 | 6; 2 | 6; 3 |
| 5 | (West Germany) (Egypt) | Jürgen Fassbender; Abdel-Ghani Mohammed | 6; 1 | 6; 1 | 6; 3 |

Monaco vs. Soviet Union

Monaco
0
Monte Carlo, Monaco
22–24 May 1970

Soviet Union
5

| | | | 1 | 2 | 3 | 4 | 5 |
|---|---|---|---|---|---|---|---|
| 1 | (Monaco) (Soviet Union) | André Vatrican; Alex Metreveli | 0; 6 | 1; 6 | 4; 6 |
| 2 | (Monaco) (Soviet Union) | Francis Truchi; Vladimir Korotkov | 2; 6 | 0; 6 | 1; 6 |
| 3 | (Monaco) (Soviet Union) | Francis Truchi / André Vatrican; Sergei Likhachev / Alex Metreveli | 0; 6 | 6; 4 | 3; 6 | 2; 6 |
| 4 | (Monaco) (Soviet Union) | André Vatrican; Vladimir Korotkov | 0; 6 | 0; 6 | 0; 6 |
| 5 | (Monaco) (Soviet Union) | Francis Truchi; Alex Metreveli | 2; 6 | 4; 6 | 2; 6 |

=== Semifinals ===
West Germany vs. Belgium

West Germany
5
Nuremberg, West Germany
12–14 June 1970

Belgium
0

| | | | 1 | 2 | 3 | 4 | 5 |
|---|---|---|---|---|---|---|---|
| 1 | (West Germany) (Belgium) | Wilhelm Bungert; Patrick Hombergen | 6; 2 | 6; 1 | 3; 6 | 6; 3 |
| 2 | (West Germany) (Belgium) | Christian Kuhnke; Eric Drossart | 6; 4 | 6; 2 | 6; 3 |
| 3 | (West Germany) (Belgium) | Ingo Buding / Christian Kuhnke; Eric Drossart / Patrick Hombergen | 4; 6 | 6; 3 | 7; 5 | 4; 6 | 10; 8 |
| 4 | (West Germany) (Belgium) | Wilhelm Bungert; Eric Drossart | 2; 6 | 6; 2 | 6; 0 | 6; 3 |
| 5 | (West Germany) (Belgium) | Christian Kuhnke; Patrick Hombergen | 6; 2 | 6; 2 | 6; 0 |

Soviet Union vs. Czechoslovakia

Soviet Union
3
Moscow, Soviet Union
11–13 June 1970
Clay

Czechoslovakia
2

| | | | 1 | 2 | 3 | 4 | 5 |
|---|---|---|---|---|---|---|---|
| 1 | (Soviet Union) (Czechoslovakia) | Toomas Leius; Jan Kodeš | 6; 2 | 3; 6 | 3; 6 | 5; 7 |
| 2 | (Soviet Union) (Czechoslovakia) | Alex Metreveli; Jan Kukal | 6; 1 | 6; 0 | 6; 2 |
| 3 | (Soviet Union) (Czechoslovakia) | Sergei Likhachev / Alex Metreveli; Jan Kodeš / Jan Kukal | 8; 6 | 1; 6 | 2; 6 | 8; 6 | 6; 4 |
| 4 | (Soviet Union) (Czechoslovakia) | Toomas Leius; Jan Kukal | 6; 3 | 4; 6 | 3; 6 | 2; 6 |
| 5 | (Soviet Union) (Czechoslovakia) | Alex Metreveli; Jan Kodeš | 6; 4 | 4; 6 | 6; 3 | 6; 3 |

=== Final ===
West Germany vs. Soviet Union

West Germany
3
Düsseldorf, West Germany
14–16 July 1970

Soviet Union
2

| | | | 1 | 2 | 3 | 4 | 5 |
|---|---|---|---|---|---|---|---|---|
| 1 | (West Germany) (Soviet Union) | Wilhelm Bungert; Vladimir Korotkov | 6; 4 | 7; 9 | 6; 4 | 6; 3 |
| 2 | (West Germany) (Soviet Union) | Christian Kuhnke; Alex Metreveli | 1; 6 | 1; 6 | 8; 10 |
| 3 | (West Germany) (Soviet Union) | Ingo Buding / Wilhelm Bungert; Sergei Likhachev / Alex Metreveli | 5; 7 | 1; 6 | 8; 6 | 6; 2 | 7; 5 |
| 4 | (West Germany) (Soviet Union) | Christian Kuhnke; Vladimir Korotkov | 6; 1 | 6; 1 | 5; 7 | 6; 2 |
| 5 | (West Germany) (Soviet Union) | Wilhelm Bungert; Alex Metreveli | 4; 6 | 5; 5 | | | | retired |
