= 1970 Davis Cup Americas Zone =

International tennis competition

The Americas Zone was one of the three regional zones of the 1970 Davis Cup.

11 teams entered the Americas Zone: 4 teams competed in the North & Central America Zone, while 7 teams competed in the South America Zone. The winner of each sub-zone would play against each other to determine who moved to the Inter-Zonal Zone to compete against the winners of the Eastern Zone and Europe Zone.

Canada defeated New Zealand in the North & Central America Zone final, and Brazil defeated Colombia in the South America Zone final. In the Americas Inter-Zonal Final, Brazil defeated Canada and progressed to the Inter-Zonal Zone.

== North & Central America Zone ==
=== Draw ===
Semifinals; 8–10 May; 6–8 June
Mexico City, Mexico (clay)
Mexico | 2
New Zealand | 3
Winnipeg, Canada (clay)
Canada | 5
Caribbean/West Indies | 0

Final; 13–15 June
Winnipeg, Canada (clay)
New Zealand | 2
Canada | 3

=== Semifinals ===
Mexico vs. New Zealand

Mexico
2
Centro Deportivo Chapultepec, Mexico City, Mexico
8–10 May 1970
Clay

New Zealand
3

| | | | 1 | 2 | 3 | 4 | 5 |
|---|---|---|---|---|---|---|---|
| 1 | (Mexico) (New Zealand) | Joaquín Loyo Mayo; Brian Fairlie | 6; 3 | 3; 6 | 3; 6 | 6; 0 | 6; 2 |
| 2 | (Mexico) (New Zealand) | Vicente Zarazúa; Onny Parun | 6; 1 | 2; 6 | 4; 6 | 5; 7 |
| 3 | (Mexico) (New Zealand) | Joaquín Loyo Mayo / Vicente Zarazúa; Brian Fairlie / Onny Parun | 11; 9 | 6; 3 | 6; 3 |
| 4 | (Mexico) (New Zealand) | Joaquín Loyo Mayo; Onny Parun | 6; 8 | 4; 6 | 4; 6 |
| 5 | (Mexico) (New Zealand) | Vicente Zarazúa; Brian Fairlie | 10; 8 | 6; 8 | 1; 6 | 1; 6 |

Canada vs. Caribbean/West Indies

Canada
5
Winnipeg Canoe Club, Winnipeg, Canada
6–8 June 1970
Clay

Caribbean/West Indies
0

| | | | 1 | 2 | 3 | 4 | 5 |
|---|---|---|---|---|---|---|---|
| 1 | (Canada) (Cricket West Indies) | John Sharpe; Richard Russell | 6; 8 | 7; 5 | 4; 6 | 6; 1 | 6; 1 |
| 2 | (Canada) (Cricket West Indies) | Mike Belkin; Lance Lumsden | 6; 2 | 4; 6 | 6; 1 | 3; 6 | 6; 0 |
| 3 | (Canada) (Cricket West Indies) | Mike Belkin / John Sharpe; Lance Lumsden / Richard Russell | 6; 2 | 6; 2 | 6; 2 |
| 4 | (Canada) (Cricket West Indies) | Peter Burwash; Leo Rolle | 6; 1 | 6; 1 | 6; 1 |
| 5 | (Canada) (Cricket West Indies) | John Sharpe; Lance Lumsden | 6; 4 | 6; 1 | 6; 0 |

=== Final ===
Canada vs. New Zealand

Canada
3
Winnipeg Canoe Club, Winnipeg, Canada
13–15 June 1970
Clay

New Zealand
2

| | | | 1 | 2 | 3 | 4 | 5 |
|---|---|---|---|---|---|---|---|---|
| 1 | (Canada) (New Zealand) | Mike Belkin; Brian Fairlie | 3; 6 | 2; 6 | 4; 6 |
| 2 | (Canada) (New Zealand) | John Sharpe; Onny Parun | 6; 2 | 2; 6 | 6; 0 | 1; 6 | | retired |
| 3 | (Canada) (New Zealand) | Mike Belkin / John Sharpe; Brian Fairlie / Onny Parun | 6; 2 | 11; 9 | 6; 3 |
| 4 | (Canada) (New Zealand) | John Sharpe; Brian Fairlie | 4; 6 | 2; 6 | 0; 6 |
| 5 | (Canada) (New Zealand) | Mike Belkin; Onny Parun | 6; 2 | 3; 6 | 7; 5 | 6; 3 |

== South America Zone ==
=== Draw ===
Quarterfinals; 20 March–6 April
Uruguay
bye
Bogotá, Colombia (clay)
Colombia | 3
Ecuador | 2
Buenos Aires, Argentina (clay)
Argentina | 2
Chile | 3
Caracas, Venezuela
Venezuela | 1
Brazil | 4

Semifinals; 5–13 April
Bogotá, Colombia
Uruguay | 0
Colombia | 5
São Paulo, Brazil
Chile | 2
Brazil | 3

Final; 14–16 June
São Paulo, Brazil
Colombia | 2
Brazil | 3

=== Quarterfinals ===
Colombia vs. Ecuador

Colombia
3
Bogotá, Colombia
4–6 April 1970
Clay

Ecuador
2

| | | | 1 | 2 | 3 | 4 | 5 |
|---|---|---|---|---|---|---|---|
| 1 | (Colombia) (Ecuador) | Iván Molina; Pancho Guzmán | 3; 6 | 7; 5 | 6; 4 | 6; 1 |
| 2 | (Colombia) (Ecuador) | Jairo Velasco; Miguel Olvera | 4; 6 | 3; 6 | 6; 1 | 6; 1 | 6; 1 |
| 3 | (Colombia) (Ecuador) | Iván Molina / Jairo Velasco; Pancho Guzmán / Miguel Olvera | 6; 2 | 7; 5 | 1; 6 | 9; 7 |
| 4 | (Colombia) (Ecuador) | Álvaro Betancur; Pancho Guzmán | 3; 6 | 4; 6 | 3; 6 |
| 5 | (Colombia) (Ecuador) | Iván Molina; Miguel Olvera | 4; 6 | 7; 5 | 6; 8 | 4; 6 |

Argentina vs. Chile

Argentina
2
Buenos Aires Lawn Tennis Club, Buenos Aires, Argentina
20–22 March 1970
Clay

Chile
3

| | | | 1 | 2 | 3 | 4 | 5 |
|---|---|---|---|---|---|---|---|
| 1 | (Argentina) (Chile) | Guillermo Vilas; Patricio Cornejo | 6; 3 | 6; 0 | 2; 6 | 2; 6 | 2; 6 |
| 2 | (Argentina) (Chile) | Julián Ganzábal; Jaime Fillol | 4; 6 | 1; 6 | 6; 4 | 6; 4 | 6; 2 |
| 3 | (Argentina) (Chile) | Lito Álvarez / Tito Vázquez; Patricio Cornejo / Jaime Fillol | 3; 6 | 2; 6 | 1; 6 |
| 4 | (Argentina) (Chile) | Guillermo Vilas; Jaime Fillol | 7; 5 | 6; 4 | 3; 6 | 6; 3 |
| 5 | (Argentina) (Chile) | Julián Ganzábal; Patricio Cornejo | 3; 6 | 6; 3 | 4; 6 | 2; 6 |

Venezuela vs. Brazil

Venezuela
1
Caracas, Venezuela
22–24 March 1970

Brazil
4

| | | | 1 | 2 | 3 | 4 | 5 |
|---|---|---|---|---|---|---|---|
| 1 | (Venezuela) (Brazil) | Jorge Andrew; José Edison Mandarino | 5; 7 | 7; 5 | 2; 6 | 1; 6 |
| 2 | (Venezuela) (Brazil) | Humphrey Hose; Thomaz Koch | 2; 6 | 8; 6 | 0; 6 | 6; 1 | 6; 8 |
| 3 | (Venezuela) (Brazil) | Jorge Andrew / Humphrey Hose; Thomaz Koch / José Edison Mandarino | 2; 6 | 7; 9 | 2; 6 |
| 4 | (Venezuela) (Brazil) | Humphrey Hose; Ricardo Bernd | 6; 4 | 6; 4 | 6; 3 |
| 5 | (Venezuela) (Brazil) | Jorge Andrew; Thomaz Koch | 4; 6 | 2; 6 | 1; 6 |

=== Semifinals ===
Colombia vs. Uruguay

Colombia
5
Bogotá, Colombia
11–13 April 1970

Uruguay
0

| | | | 1 | 2 | 3 | 4 | 5 |
|---|---|---|---|---|---|---|---|
| 1 | (Colombia) (Uruguay) | Jairo Velasco; Gustavo Stapf | 6; 1 | 6; 0 | 6; 0 |
| 2 | (Colombia) (Uruguay) | Iván Molina; Alberto Laborde | 6; 1 | 6; 2 | 6; 0 |
| 3 | (Colombia) (Uruguay) | Iván Molina / Jairo Velasco; Alberto Laborde / Gustavo Stapf | 6; 2 | 6; 1 | 6; 0 |
| 4 | (Colombia) (Uruguay) | Jairo Velasco; Alberto Laborde | 6; 0 | 6; 3 | 6; 3 |
| 5 | (Colombia) (Uruguay) | Álvaro Betancur; Gustavo Stapf | 6; 1 | 6; 0 | 6; 0 |

Brazil vs. Chile

Brazil
3
São Paulo, Brazil
5–7 April 1970

Chile
2

| | | | 1 | 2 | 3 | 4 | 5 |
|---|---|---|---|---|---|---|---|
| 1 | (Brazil) (Chile) | Thomaz Koch; Patricio Cornejo | 1; 6 | 3; 6 | 6; 2 | 6; 2 | 6; 1 |
| 2 | (Brazil) (Chile) | José Edison Mandarino; Jaime Fillol | 1; 6 | 6; 3 | 1; 6 | 7; 5 | 7; 9 |
| 3 | (Brazil) (Chile) | Thomaz Koch / José Edison Mandarino; Patricio Cornejo / Jaime Fillol | 6; 4 | 6; 4 | 10; 12 | 6; 4 |
| 4 | (Brazil) (Chile) | José Edison Mandarino; Patricio Cornejo | 5; 7 | 6; 4 | 6; 2 | 3; 6 | 2; 6 |
| 5 | (Brazil) (Chile) | Thomaz Koch; Jaime Fillol | 6; 1 | 6; 3 | 4; 6 | 4; 6 | 8; 6 |

=== Final ===
Brazil vs. Colombia

Brazil
3
São Paulo, Brazil
14–16 June 1970

Colombia
2

| | | | 1 | 2 | 3 | 4 | 5 |
|---|---|---|---|---|---|---|---|
| 1 | (Brazil) (Colombia) | Luis Felipe Tavares; Jairo Velasco | 5; 7 | 1; 6 | 8; 6 | 4; 6 |
| 2 | (Brazil) (Colombia) | José Edison Mandarino; Iván Molina | 6; 2 | 6; 2 | 6; 3 |
| 3 | (Brazil) (Colombia) | Carlos Alberto Fernandes / José Edison Mandarino; Iván Molina / Jairo Velasco | 5; 7 | 2; 6 | 6; 4 | 3; 6 |
| 4 | (Brazil) (Colombia) | José Edison Mandarino; Jairo Velasco | 4; 6 | 8; 6 | 6; 3 | 6; 2 |
| 5 | (Brazil) (Colombia) | Luis Felipe Tavares; Iván Molina | 4; 6 | 2; 6 | 6; 3 | 9; 7 | 6; 3 |

== Americas Inter-Zonal Final ==
Brazil vs. Canada

Brazil
3
Esporte Clube Pinheiros, São Paulo, Brazil
18–20 July 1970
Clay

Canada
2

| | | | 1 | 2 | 3 | 4 | 5 |
|---|---|---|---|---|---|---|---|
| 1 | (Brazil) (Canada) | Thomaz Koch; John Sharpe | 9; 7 | 7; 5 | 5; 7 | 8; 6 |
| 2 | (Brazil) (Canada) | José Edison Mandarino; Mike Belkin | 2; 6 | 4; 6 | 2; 6 |
| 3 | (Brazil) (Canada) | Thomaz Koch / José Edison Mandarino; Mike Belkin / John Sharpe | 6; 3 | 3; 6 | 0; 6 | 6; 4 | 6; 3 |
| 4 | (Brazil) (Canada) | Thomaz Koch; Mike Belkin | 8; 6 | 6; 8 | 3; 6 | 4; 6 |
| 5 | (Brazil) (Canada) | José Edison Mandarino; John Sharpe | 6; 1 | 6; 0 | 6; 2 |
