= 1970 Davis Cup Eastern Zone =

International tennis competition

The Eastern Zone was one of the three regional zones of the 1970 Davis Cup.

11 teams entered the Eastern Zone, competing across 2 sub-zones. The winner of each sub-zones would play against each other to determine who would compete in the Inter-Zonal Zone against the winners of the Americas Zone and Europe Zone.

Australia defeated Japan in the Zone A final, and India defeated Ceylon in the Zone B final. In the Inter-Zonal final India defeated Australia and progressed to the Inter-Zonal Zone.

== Zone A ==
=== Draw ===
Quarterfinals; 14–30 March
Philippines
bye
Australia | w/o
South Korea
Hong Kong
Hong Kong | 0
Japan | 5
Saigon, South Vietnam
South Vietnam | 3
Indonesia | 0

Semifinals; 3–12 April
Manila, Philippines
Philippines | 0
Australia | 5
Tokyo, Japan
Japan | 5
South Vietnam | 0

Final; 17–19 April
Tokyo, Japan
Australia | 5
Japan | 0

=== Quarterfinals ===
Hong Kong vs. Japan

Hong Kong
0
Hong Kong
14–16 March 1970

Japan
5

| | | | 1 | 2 | 3 | 4 | 5 |
|---|---|---|---|---|---|---|---|
| 1 | (Hong Kong) (Japan) | Ling Fong; Keishiro Yanagi | 2; 6 | 2; 6 | 2; 6 |
| 2 | (Hong Kong) (Japan) | Kenneth Tsui; Isao Kobayashi | 2; 6 | 3; 6 | 3; 6 |
| 3 | (Hong Kong) (Japan) | Kenneth Tsui / Winston Wei-Chung; Isao Watanabe / Koji Watanabe | 4; 6 | 3; 6 | 1; 6 |
| 4 | (Hong Kong) (Japan) | Ling Fong; Isao Kobayashi | 3; 6 | 2; 6 | 1; 6 |
| 5 | (Hong Kong) (Japan) | Kenneth Tsui; Isao Watanabe | 0; 6 | 0; 6 | 2; 6 |

South Vietnam vs. Indonesia

South Vietnam
3
Saigon, South Vietnam
28–30 March 1970

Indonesia
0

| | | | 1 | 2 | 3 | 4 | 5 |
|---|---|---|---|---|---|---|---|---|
| 1 | (South Vietnam) (Indonesia) | Nguyễn Văn Thành; Atet Wijono | 3; 6 | 6; 3 | 0; 6 | 6; 4 | 6; 1 |
| 2 | (South Vietnam) (Indonesia) | Võ Văn Bảy; Gondo Widjojo | 6; 0 | 6; 1 | 6; 1 |
| 3 | (South Vietnam) (Indonesia) | Võ Văn Bảy / Mao Văn Rèn; Gondo Widjojo / Atet Wijono | 6; 0 | 6; 1 | 6; 1 |
| 4 | (South Vietnam) (Indonesia) | Võ Văn Bảy; Atet Wijono | | | | | | not played |
| 5 | (South Vietnam) (Indonesia) | Nguyễn Văn Thành; Gondo Widjojo | | | | | | not played |

=== Semifinals ===
Philippines vs. Australia

Philippines
0
Manila, Philippines
3–5 April 1970

Australia
5

| | | | 1 | 2 | 3 | 4 | 5 |
|---|---|---|---|---|---|---|---|
| 1 | (Philippines) (Australia) | Eduardo Cruz; Ray Ruffels | 4; 6 | 2; 6 | 4; 6 |
| 2 | (Philippines) (Australia) | Raymundo Deyro; Dick Crealy | 2; 6 | 6; 4 | 2; 6 | 1; 6 |
| 3 | (Philippines) (Australia) | Eduardo Cruz / Alexander Marcial; Dick Crealy / Allan Stone | 3; 6 | 4; 6 | 4; 6 |
| 4 | (Philippines) (Australia) | Raymundo Deyro; Ray Ruffels | 1; 6 | 0; 6 | 2; 6 |
| 5 | (Philippines) (Australia) | Eduardo Cruz; John Alexander | 6; 8 | 3; 6 | 3; 6 |

Japan vs. South Vietnam

Japan
5
Tokyo, Japan
10–12 April 1970

South Vietnam
0

| | | | 1 | 2 | 3 | 4 | 5 |
|---|---|---|---|---|---|---|---|
| 1 | (Japan) (South Vietnam) | Koji Watanabe; Võ Văn Thành | 6; 3 | 6; 3 | 6; 1 |
| 2 | (Japan) (South Vietnam) | Isao Kobayashi; Võ Văn Bảy | 6; 4 | 6; 4 | 9; 11 | 6; 2 |
| 3 | (Japan) (South Vietnam) | Hidesaburo Kuromatsu / Yuji Tezuka; Võ Văn Bảy / Võ Văn Thành | 6; 1 | 8; 6 | 6; 1 |
| 4 | (Japan) (South Vietnam) | Koji Watanabe; Võ Văn Bảy | 6; 2 | 6; 3 | 6; 4 |
| 5 | (Japan) (South Vietnam) | Isao Kobayashi; Võ Văn Thành | 6; 4 | 8; 6 | 6; 3 |

=== Final ===
Japan vs. Australia

Japan
0
Tokyo, Japan
17–19 April 1970

Australia
5

| | | | 1 | 2 | 3 | 4 | 5 |
|---|---|---|---|---|---|---|---|
| 1 | (Japan) (Australia) | Koji Watanabe; Allan Stone | 6; 8 | 9; 7 | 4; 6 | 0; 6 |
| 2 | (Japan) (Australia) | Isao Kobayashi; Dick Crealy | 4; 6 | 2; 6 | 6; 2 | 4; 6 |
| 3 | (Japan) (Australia) | Junzo Kawamori / Takeshi Koura; Ray Ruffels / Allan Stone | 5; 7 | 7; 5 | 2; 6 | 4; 6 |
| 4 | (Japan) (Australia) | Koji Watanabe; Dick Crealy | 11; 9 | 2; 6 | 1; 6 | 6; 3 | 3; 6 |
| 5 | (Japan) (Australia) | Isao Kobayashi; Ray Ruffels | 2; 6 | 2; 6 | 0; 6 |

== Zone B ==
=== Draw ===
Semifinals; 14–30 March
Patna, India
India | 3
Pakistan | 1
Kuala Lumpur, Malaysia
Malaysia | 0
Ceylon | 3

Final; 17–19 April
Bombay, India
India | 5
Ceylon | 0

=== Semifinals ===
India vs. Pakistan

India
3
Patna, India
28–30 March 1970

Pakistan
1

| | | | 1 | 2 | 3 | 4 | 5 |
|---|---|---|---|---|---|---|---|---|
| 1 | (India) (Pakistan) | Jaidip Mukerjea; Haroon Rahim | 4; 6 | 5; 7 | 10; 8 | 6; 2 | | retired |
| 2 | (India) (Pakistan) | Premjit Lall; Munawar Iqbal | 13; 11 | 6; 4 | 6; 4 |
| 3 | (India) (Pakistan) | Premjit Lall / Jaidip Mukerjea; Munawar Iqbal / Haroon Rahim | 6; 4 | 6; 1 | 6; 4 |
| 4 | (India) (Pakistan) | Sashi Menon; Munawar Iqbal | 6; 8 | 1; 6 | 4; 6 |
| 5 | (India) (Pakistan) | Vijay Amritraj; Mohammed Arif Ilahi | 7; 5 | 7; 5 | 8; 10 | 5; 5 | | not completed |

Malaysia vs. Ceylon

Malaysia
0
Kuala Lumpur, Malaysia
14–16 March 1970

Ceylon
3

| | | | 1 | 2 | 3 | 4 | 5 |
|---|---|---|---|---|---|---|---|---|
| 1 | (Malaysia) (Dominion of Ceylon) | Sultan-Aman Azman; Bernard Pinto | 1; 6 | 2; 6 | 1; 6 |
| 2 | (Malaysia) (Dominion of Ceylon) | Song-Kean Tan; Rupert Ferdinands | 5; 7 | 3; 6 | 1; 6 |
| 3 | (Malaysia) (Dominion of Ceylon) | Sultan-Aman Azman / Song-Kean Tan; Rupert Ferdinands / Bernard Pinto | 6; 4 | 3; 6 | 6; 3 | 0; 6 | 0; 6 |
| 4 | (Malaysia) (Dominion of Ceylon) | Song-Kean Tan; Bernard Pinto | | | | | | not played |
| 5 | (Malaysia) (Dominion of Ceylon) | Sultan-Aman Azman; Rupert Ferdinands | | | | | | not played |

=== Final ===
India vs. Ceylon

India
5
Bombay, India
17–19 April 1970

Ceylon
0

| | | | 1 | 2 | 3 | 4 | 5 |
|---|---|---|---|---|---|---|---|
| 1 | (India) (Dominion of Ceylon) | Jaidip Mukerjea; Bernard Pinto | 6; 3 | 6; 1 | 6; 4 |
| 2 | (India) (Dominion of Ceylon) | Premjit Lall; Senaka Kumara | 6; 0 | 6; 3 | 6; 2 |
| 3 | (India) (Dominion of Ceylon) | Vijay Amritraj / Sashi Menon; Senaka Kumara / Bernard Pinto | 6; 3 | 6; 4 | 5; 7 | 6; 4 |
| 4 | (India) (Dominion of Ceylon) | Vijay Amritraj; Senaka Kumara | 6; 1 | 6; 0 | 6; 3 |
| 5 | (India) (Dominion of Ceylon) | Sashi Menon; Bernard Pinto | 6; 3 | 6; 1 | 4; 6 | 8; 6 |

== Eastern Inter-Zonal Final ==
India vs. Australia

India
3
Bangalore, India
3–5 May 1970

Australia
1

| | | | 1 | 2 | 3 | 4 | 5 |
|---|---|---|---|---|---|---|---|---|
| 1 | (India) (Australia) | Jaidip Mukerjea; Dick Crealy | 3; 6 | 6; 8 | 6; 4 | 6; 3 | 6; 2 |
| 2 | (India) (Australia) | Premjit Lall; Ray Ruffels | 6; 2 | 6; 8 | 6; 3 | 3; 6 | 14; 12 |
| 3 | (India) (Australia) | Premjit Lall / Jaidip Mukerjea; John Alexander / Allan Stone | 13; 15 | 4; 6 | 4; 6 |
| 4 | (India) (Australia) | Premjit Lall; Dick Crealy | 8; 6 | 6; 2 | 6; 2 |
| 5 | (India) (Australia) | Jaidip Mukerjea; Ray Ruffels | 6; 3 | 7; 5 | 4; 6 | 3; 6 | 6; 6 | not completed |
