= List of Denmark Davis Cup team representatives =

This is a list of tennis players who have represented the Denmark Davis Cup team in an official Davis Cup match. Denmark have taken part in the competition since 1921.

== Players ==
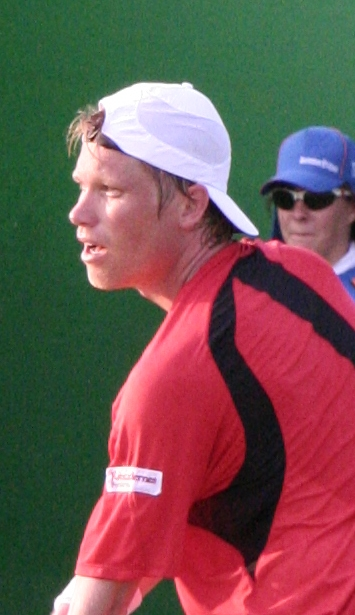
Kristian Pless

As of October 2020

Player	W-L (Total)	W-L (Singles)	W-L (Doubles)	Ties	Debut
Thomas G. Andersen	0–1	0–0	0–1	1	2002
Peter Bastiansen	28–17	18–11	10–6	17	1981
Finn Bekkevold	0–2	0–2	0–0	1	1938
Erik Bjerre	1–2	1–1	0–1	2	1946
Andreas Bjerrehus	0–2	0–2	0–0	2	2015
Bob Borella	1–1	1–1	0–0	2	2000
Christian Camradt	2–0	2–0	0–0	1	1992
Kenneth Carlsen	40–25	29–13	11–12	23	1992
Finn Christensen	2–2	2–1	0–1	2	1974
Morten Christensen	12–19	5–12	7–7	19	1986
Tom Christensen	12–9	5–8	7–1	8	1972
Lars Elvstrøm	14–11	9–8	5–3	9	1973
Frederik Fetterlein	19–29	15–20	4–9	23	1989
Peter Flintsø	0–2	0–1	0–1	1	1989
Mads Gottlieb	0–1	0–1	0–0	1	2001
Carsten Gregers	0–1	0–0	0–1	1	1976
Benjamin Hannestad	1–2	1–2	0–0	3	2016
Carl-Edvard Hedelund	4–21	3–16	1–5	11	1962
Povl Henriksen	17–11	8–5	9–6	16	1921
Søren Hess-Olesen	3–3	2–3	1–0	4	2017
Soren Hojberg	0–2	0–1	0–1	2	1955
August Holmgren	1–0	1–0	0–0	1	2017
Niels Holst	0–2	0–2	0–0	1	1939
Vagn Ingerslev	1–3	1–3	0–0	2	1921
Johannes Ingildsen	1–0	0–0	1–0	1	2019
Jannik Ipsen	0–3	0–2	0–1	1	1946
Anker Jacobsen	4–8	3–7	1–1	5	1932
Christoffer Konigsfeldt	1–2	1–2	0–0	3	2012
Niels Korner	0–3	0–2	0–1	2	1936
Thomas Kromann	5–3	1–2	4–1	6	2008
Patrik Langvardt	3–2	2–2	1–0	4	2000
Henning Larsen	1–0	1–0	0–0	1	1923
Thorkild Larsen	0–3	0–2	0–1	1	1962
Thomas Larsen	1–5	1–5	0–0	4	1996
Mik Ledvonova	4–3	4–3	0–0	6	2002
Jan Leschly	15–16	9–11	6–5	13	1960
Jacob Melskens	4–1	1–0	3–1	4	2005
Michael Mortensen	23–27	12–14	11–13	24	1979
Frederik Nielsen	60–39	37–25	23–14	43	2003
Kurt Nielsen	53–43	42–23	11–20	33	1948
Knud-Erik Nielsen	2–6	0–4	2–2	4	1972
Rasmus Nørby	10–4	6–2	4–2	10	2003
Henrik Norkjaer	0–1	0–0	0–1	1	1972
Martin Pedersen	12–10	9–8	3–2	14	2006
Axel Petersen	11–12	9–11	2–1	11	1924
Kristian Pless	12–8	11–4	1–4	8	1999
Helge Plougmann	1–7	1–5	0–2	3	1936
Jonathan Printzlau	4–5	1–2	3–3	7	2000
Kasper Rud	0–2	0–2	0–0	1	1976
Holger Rune	4–1	4–1	0–0	3	2018
Christian Sigsgaard	2–3	2–3	0–0	3	2015
Thomas Sørensen	0–1	0–1	0–0	1	1989
Michael Tauson	17–13	15–10	2–3	14	1985
Erik Tegner	2–10	1–7	1–3	4	1921
Bjorn Thalbitzer	1–0	0–0	1–0	1	1924
Morgan Thempler	2–3	0–0	2–3	5	2005
Per Thielsen	0–1	0–0	0–1	1	1946
Mikael Torpegaard	4–3	4–3	0–0	5	2014
Einer Ulrich	39–35	23–23	16–12	28	1924
Jørgen Ulrich	26–28	18–18	8–10	22	1955
Torben Ulrich	46–56	31–35	15–21	40	1948
Arne Velschow-Rasmussen	0–1	0–1	0–0	1	1946
Kasper Warming	1–0	1–0	0–0	1	2002
Soren Wedege	1–1	1–1	0–0	2	2010
Alfred Wium	0–1	0–0	0–1	1	1939
Erik Worm	4–13	2–8	2–5	8	1922
