= Soren Wedege =

Danish tennis player

- Country (sports): Denmark
- Born: 7 September 1989 (age 35)
- Prize money: $6,044

Singles
- Highest ranking: No. 1068 (23 Jul 2012)

Doubles
- Highest ranking: No. 813 (6 May 2013)

Soren Wedege (born 7 September 1989) is a Danish former tennis player, who represented Denmark in the Davis Cup.

== Tennis career ==
Wedege played in two Davis Cup ties for Denmark, making his debut in 2010. He played two singles matches in Davis Cup, with one win and one loss. He mainly participated on the Futures circuit and partnering with Milos Sekulic, won one Futures doubles title.

== ITF Futures titles ==
=== Doubles: 1 ===
No.	Date	Tournament	Tier	Surface	Partner	Opponents	Score
1.	Sep 2012	Sweden F4, Uppsala	Futures	Hard	(Sweden) Milos Sekulic	(Sweden) Daniel Berta (Sweden) Nicklas Szymanski	6–2, 7–6^{(7–1)}

== See also ==
- List of Denmark Davis Cup team representatives
