= Tilburg Indoor =

Defunct tennis tournament
- Tour: ILTF World Circuit (1967–70)
- Founded: 1967; 58 years ago
- Abolished: 1972; 53 years ago
- Location: Tilburg, Netherlands
- Venue: Tilburg University Sports Center
- Surface: Carpet / indoor

The Tilburg Indoor was a men's and women's open international indoor tennis tournament was founded in 1967. Also known as the Tilburg International Indoor the tournament was first played at Tilburg, Netherlands. It was staged annually till 1972.

== History ==
The Tilburg Indoor tournament was founded in 1967 and was played at the Tilburg University Sports Center, Tilburg, Netherlands. It was staged annually until 1972 when it was discontinued.

== Finals ==
Notes: Where a runner up is not shown or the score sections have been blanked.

=== Men's singles ===
Year	Winners	Runners-up	Score
1967	(Netherlands) Nick Fleury	(Netherlands) Jan Hajer	8–6, 6–3.
↓ Open era ↓
1970	(Australia) Peter Doerner	(Australia) Colin Dibley	6–4, 4–6, 6–2.
1971	(Greece) Nicholas Kalogeropoulos	(Australia) Barry Phillips-Moore	1–6, 6–3, 6–1.
1972	(France) Jean-Baptiste Chanfreau	(Belgium) Eric Drossart	6–2, 6–4.
