= 1970 Davis Cup =

1970 edition of the Davis Cup

Details
- Duration: 14 March – 31 August 1970
- Edition: 59th
- Teams: 50

Champion
- Winning nation: United States

The 1970 Davis Cup was the 59th edition of the Davis Cup, the most important tournament between national teams in men's tennis. 31 teams entered the Europe Zone, 11 teams entered the Americas Zone, and 11 teams entered the Eastern Zone. Hong Kong made its first appearance in the tournament.

Brazil defeated Canada in the Americas Inter-Zonal final, India defeated Australia in the Eastern Inter-Zonal final, and Spain and West Germany were the winners of the two Europe Zones, defeating Yugoslavia and the Soviet Union respectively.

In the Inter-Zonal Zone, West Germany defeated India and Spain defeated Brazil in the semifinals, and then West Germany defeated Spain in the final. West Germany were then defeated by the defending champions United States in the Challenge Round. The final was played at the Harold Clark Courts in Cleveland, Ohio, United States on 29–31 August.

== Americas Zone ==
=== North & Central America Zone ===
Semifinals; 8–10 May; 6–8 June
Mexico City, Mexico (clay)
Mexico	2
New Zealand	3
Winnipeg, Canada (clay)
Canada	5
Caribbean/West Indies	0

Final; 13–15 June
Winnipeg, Canada (clay)
New Zealand	2
Canada	3

=== South America Zone ===
Quarterfinals; 20 March–6 April
Uruguay
bye
Bogotá, Colombia (clay)
Colombia	3
Ecuador	2
Buenos Aires, Argentina (clay)
Argentina	2
Chile	3
Caracas, Venezuela
Venezuela	1
Brazil	4

Semifinals; 5–13 April
Bogotá, Colombia
Uruguay	0
Colombia	5
São Paulo, Brazil
Chile	2
Brazil	3

Final; 14–16 June
São Paulo, Brazil
Colombia	2
Brazil	3

=== Americas Inter-Zonal Final ===
Brazil vs. Canada

Brazil
3
Esporte Clube Pinheiros, São Paulo, Brazil
18–20 July 1970
Clay

Canada
2

			1	2	3	4	5
1	(Brazil) (Canada)	Thomaz Koch; John Sharpe	9; 7	7; 5	5; 7	8; 6
2	(Brazil) (Canada)	José Edison Mandarino; Mike Belkin	2; 6	4; 6	2; 6
3	(Brazil) (Canada)	Thomaz Koch / José Edison Mandarino; Mike Belkin / John Sharpe	6; 3	3; 6	0; 6	6; 4	6; 3
4	(Brazil) (Canada)	Thomaz Koch; Mike Belkin	8; 6	6; 8	3; 6	4; 6
5	(Brazil) (Canada)	José Edison Mandarino; John Sharpe	6; 1	6; 0	6; 2

== Eastern Zone ==
=== Zone A ===
Quarterfinals; 14–30 March
Philippines
bye
Australia	w/o
South Korea
Hong Kong
Hong Kong	0
Japan	5
Saigon, South Vietnam
South Vietnam	3
Indonesia	0

Semifinals; 3–12 April
Manila, Philippines
Philippines	0
Australia	5
Tokyo, Japan
Japan	5
South Vietnam	0

Final; 17–19 April
Tokyo, Japan
Australia	5
Japan	0

=== Zone B ===
Semifinals; 14–30 March
Patna, India
India	3
Pakistan	1
Kuala Lumpur, Malaysia
Malaysia	0
Ceylon	3

Final; 17–19 April
Bombay, India
India	5
Ceylon	0

=== Eastern Inter-Zonal Final ===
India vs. Australia

India
3
Bangalore, India
3–5 May 1970

Australia
1

			1	2	3	4	5
1	(India) (Australia)	Jaidip Mukerjea; Dick Crealy	3; 6	6; 8	6; 4	6; 3	6; 2
2	(India) (Australia)	Premjit Lall; Ray Ruffels	6; 2	6; 8	6; 3	3; 6	14; 12
3	(India) (Australia)	Premjit Lall / Jaidip Mukerjea; John Alexander / Allan Stone	13; 15	4; 6	4; 6
4	(India) (Australia)	Premjit Lall; Dick Crealy	8; 6	6; 2	6; 2
5	(India) (Australia)	Jaidip Mukerjea; Ray Ruffels	6; 3	7; 5	4; 6	3; 6	6; 6	not completed

== Europe Zone ==
=== Zone A ===
First Round; 1–10 May
Tehran, Iran
Romania	4
Iran	1
Athens, Greece
Greece	4
Netherlands	1
Mondorf-les-Bains, Luxembourg
Luxembourg	0
Ireland	3
Maribor, Yugoslavia
Yugoslavia	3
Poland	2
Stockholm, Sweden (clay)
Sweden	0
Spain	5
Istanbul, Turkey
Turkey	0
Bulgaria	5
Geneva, Switzerland
Switzerland	1
France	4
Edinburgh, United Kingdom (clay)
Austria	3
Great Britain	2

Quarterfinals; 22–25 May
Bucharest, Romania (clay)
Romania	5
Greece	0
Dublin, Ireland
Ireland	0
Yugoslavia	5
Barcelona, Spain (clay)
Spain	5
Bulgaria	0
Paris, France (clay)
France	5
Austria	0

Semifinals; 12–15 June
Maribor, Yugoslavia (clay)
Romania	2
Yugoslavia	3
Paris, France (clay)
Spain	5
France	0

Final; 16–18 July
Barcelona, Spain
Yugoslavia	1
Spain	4

=== Zone A Final ===
Spain vs. Yugoslavia

Spain
4
Barcelona, Spain
16–18 July 1970

Yugoslavia
1

			1	2	3	4	5
1	(Spain) (Socialist Federal Republic of Yugoslavia)	Manuel Orantes; Nikola Špear	6; 4	6; 4	6; 2
2	(Spain) (Socialist Federal Republic of Yugoslavia)	Manuel Santana; Željko Franulović	6; 4	6; 4	1; 6	6; 4
3	(Spain) (Socialist Federal Republic of Yugoslavia)	Juan Gisbert / Manuel Santana; Željko Franulović / Nikola Špear	6; 4	6; 1	6; 2
4	(Spain) (Socialist Federal Republic of Yugoslavia)	Manuel Orantes; Željko Franulović	7; 5	6; 4	4; 6	6; 8	2; 6
5	(Spain) (Socialist Federal Republic of Yugoslavia)	Manuel Santana; Nikola Špear	6; 2	6; 1	7; 5

=== Zone B ===
First Round; 1–24 May
South Africa
bye
Helsinki, Finland
Finland	1
Belgium	4
Bad Homburg, West Germany (clay)
West Germany	4
Denmark	1
Cairo, Egypt (clay)
Egypt	3
Norway	1
Turin, Italy (clay)
Italy	2
Czechoslovakia	3
Israel
Rhodesia	w/o
Lisbon, Portugal (clay)
Portugal	1
Monaco	4
Budapest, Hungary
Hungary	2
Soviet Union	3

Quarterfinals; 22–24 May
South Africa
Belgium	w/o (Note: The tie was scratched and Belgium advanced to the semifinals after South Africa were ejected from the tournament on 23 March due to protests over the South African Government's apartheid policies.)
West Berlin
West Germany	5
Egypt	0
Czechoslovakia	w/o
Rhodesia
Monte Carlo, Monaco
Monaco	0
Soviet Union	5

Semifinals; 11–14 June
Nuremberg, West Germany
Belgium	0
West Germany	5
Moscow, Soviet Union (clay)
Czechoslovakia	2
Soviet Union	3

Final; 14–16 July
Düsseldorf, West Germany
West Germany	3
Soviet Union	2

=== Zone B Final ===
West Germany vs. Soviet Union

West Germany
3
Düsseldorf, West Germany
14–16 July 1970

Soviet Union
2

			1	2	3	4	5
1	(West Germany) (Soviet Union)	Wilhelm Bungert; Vladimir Korotkov	6; 4	7; 9	6; 4	6; 3
2	(West Germany) (Soviet Union)	Christian Kuhnke; Alex Metreveli	1; 6	1; 6	8; 10
3	(West Germany) (Soviet Union)	Ingo Buding / Wilhelm Bungert; Sergei Likhachev / Alex Metreveli	5; 7	1; 6	8; 6	6; 2	7; 5
4	(West Germany) (Soviet Union)	Christian Kuhnke; Vladimir Korotkov	6; 1	6; 1	5; 7	6; 2
5	(West Germany) (Soviet Union)	Wilhelm Bungert; Alex Metreveli	4; 6	5; 5				retired

== Inter-Zonal Zone ==
=== Draw ===
Semifinals; 1–4 August
Poona, India
EUR-B	West Germany	5
EAS	India	0
São Paulo, Brazil
AME	Brazil	1
EUR-A	Spain	4

Final; 14–17 August
Düsseldorf, West Germany
EUR-B	West Germany	4
EUR-A	Spain	1

=== Semifinals ===
India vs. West Germany

India
0
Poona, India
1–3 August 1970

West Germany
5

			1	2	3	4	5
1	(India) (West Germany)	Jaidip Mukerjea; Wilhelm Bungert	2; 6	5; 7	3; 6
2	(India) (West Germany)	Premjit Lall; Christian Kuhnke	4; 6	3; 6	3; 6
3	(India) (West Germany)	Premjit Lall / Jaidip Mukerjea; Wilhelm Bungert / Christian Kuhnke	2; 6	6; 4	11; 13	3; 6
4	(India) (West Germany)	Premjit Lall; Wilhelm Bungert	4; 6	3; 6	7; 5	11; 13
5	(India) (West Germany)	Jaidip Mukerjea; Christian Kuhnke	9; 11	6; 8	4; 6

Brazil vs. Spain

Brazil
1
São Paulo, Brazil
2–4 August 1970

Spain
4

			1	2	3	4	5
1	(Brazil) (Spain)	Thomaz Koch; Manuel Orantes	1; 6	3; 6	6; 3	1; 6
2	(Brazil) (Spain)	José Edison Mandarino; Manuel Santana	6; 3	3; 6	6; 2	0; 6	4; 6
3	(Brazil) (Spain)	Thomaz Koch / José Edison Mandarino; Juan Gisbert / Manuel Santana	1; 6	4; 6	4; 6
4	(Brazil) (Spain)	José Edison Mandarino; Manuel Orantes	6; 3	1; 6	3; 6	3; 6
5	(Brazil) (Spain)	Thomaz Koch; Manuel Santana	7; 5	10; 8	4; 6			retired

=== Final ===
West Germany vs. Spain

West Germany
4
Düsseldorf, West Germany
14–17 August 1970

Spain
1

			1	2	3	4	5
1	(West Germany) (Spain)	Wilhelm Bungert; Manuel Orantes	4; 6	8; 10	9; 11
2	(West Germany) (Spain)	Christian Kuhnke; Manuel Santana	6; 4	6; 8	12; 10	6; 2
3	(West Germany) (Spain)	Wilhelm Bungert / Christian Kuhnke; Juan Gisbert / Manuel Santana	6; 4	12; 10	6; 3
4	(West Germany) (Spain)	Christian Kuhnke; Manuel Orantes	6; 3	6; 3	7; 5
5	(West Germany) (Spain)	Wilhelm Bungert; Manuel Santana	6; 4	6; 1	6; 3

== Challenge Round ==
United States vs. West Germany

United States
5
Harold Clark Courts, Cleveland, OH, United States
29–31 August 1970
Hard

West Germany
0

			1	2	3	4	5
1	(United States) (West Germany)	Arthur Ashe; Wilhelm Bungert	6; 2	10; 8	6; 2
2	(United States) (West Germany)	Cliff Richey; Christian Kuhnke	6; 3	6; 4	6; 2
3	(United States) (West Germany)	Bob Lutz / Stan Smith; Wilhelm Bungert / Christian Kuhnke	6; 3	7; 5	6; 4
4	(United States) (West Germany)	Cliff Richey; Wilhelm Bungert	6; 4	6; 4	7; 5
5	(United States) (West Germany)	Arthur Ashe; Christian Kuhnke	6; 8	10; 12	9; 7	13; 11	6; 4
