= Michel Burgener =

Swiss tennis player

- Country (sports): Switzerland
- Born: 1 June 1949 (age 75)

Singles
- Highest ranking: No. 306 (5 March 1975)

Michel Burgener (born 1 June 1949) is a retired Swiss professional male tennis player.

== Career ==
Michel Burgener won Swiss Indoors in 1972 and he was a member of the Switzerland Davis Cup team.
