= Lars Elvstrøm =

Danish tennis player

- Country (sports): Denmark
- Born: 18 August 1949 (age 77) Copenhagen, Denmark
- Plays: Right-handed

Singles
- Career record: 6–14
- Career titles: 1
- Highest ranking: No. 218 (12 Jul 1978)

Grand Slam singles results
- Australian Open: 1R (1973)

Doubles
- Career record: 3–13
- Career titles: 0
- Highest ranking: No. 480 (3 Jan 1983)

Grand Slam doubles results
- Australian Open: 2R (1973)

Lars Hugo Elvstrøm (born 18 August 1949) is a former tennis player from Denmark.

== Career ==
Elvstrøm was a regular member of the Danish Davis Cup team for 1973 to 1980 and played a total of 29 matches in 9 ties for his country.

His best result on the ATP Tour was winning the singles title at the Copenhagen Open, in 1976, beating Jean-François Caujolle in the final.

== ATP career finals ==
=== Singles: 1 (1 win) ===
Result	W/L	Date	Tournament	Surface	Opponent	Score
Win	1–0	Jan 1976	Copenhagen, Denmark	Carpet	(France) Jean-François Caujolle	6–4, 6–4

== See also ==
- List of Denmark Davis Cup team representatives
