= John Sharpe (tennis) =

Australian-born Canadian tennis player

- Country (sports): Australia; Canada
- Born: 18 May 1939 (age 86) Melbourne, Australia
- Plays: Left-handed

Singles
- Career record: 10-16

Grand Slam singles results
- Australian Open: 2R (1963, 1964, 1965)
- French Open: 1R (1965)
- Wimbledon: 2R (1962)
- US Open: 4R (1961)

John Sharpe (born 18 May 1939) is an Australian born Canadian former professional tennis player.

Born in Melbourne, Sharpe featured in the main draw of all four grand slam tournaments while touring as an Australian in the early 1960s. His best performance came at the 1961 U.S. National Championships, where he made it through to the fourth round.

Sharpe studied in the United States at Pan American College, Texas and was a member of their collegiate tennis team. Around 1965 he moved to Toronto for work and in 1968 became eligible to play for his adoptive country. During this period he was also studying to be a stockbroker and was largely absent from the international tour.

In 1969, he began touring again as a member of the Canada Davis Cup team, appearing in a total of five ties in three years. This includes a 3-2 win over New Zealand in 1970 to qualify Canada for the Americas Inter-Zonal Final, with his singles win over Onny Parun as well as his doubles victory against Parun and Brian Fairlie important to the final outcome.

== See also ==
- List of Canada Davis Cup team representatives
