= Dimitri Sturdza =

Swiss former professional tennis player

- Country (sports): Switzerland
- Born: 10 November 1938 (age 86); Iași, Romania

Singles
- Career record: 6–28

Grand Slam singles results
- French Open: 3R (1968)
- Wimbledon: 2R (1963, 1964, 1966)
- US Open: 2R (1964)

Dimitri Sturdza (born 10 November 1938), also known as Tim Sturdza, is a Swiss former professional tennis player.

== Early life and ancestry ==
Born in Iași, he is the son of Prince Gheorghe Sturdza (born 1912) and his Norwegian wife, Margareta Kvaal. By birth, he is a member of the House of Sturdza, powerful Romanian aristocratic family that later settled in Lausanne, Switzerland. Paternally, he is great-great-grandson of Mihail Sturdza, the reigning Prince of Moldavia.

== Biography ==
During his youth, he traveled the world, using a French passport. Outside of tennis he holds a master's degree in atomic physics and was involved with the European space program.

== Career ==
Sturdza made the third round of the French Open once and was a Davis Cup player for Switzerland from 1964 to 1978, winning 17 rubbers. His best Davis Cup singles wins were over West Germany's Wilhelm Bungert in 1966 and France's Georges Goven in 1970. He was non playing captain of the Swiss team for the 1992 Davis Cup World Group final against the United States.

== See also ==
- List of Switzerland Davis Cup team representatives
