= Bernard Mignot =

Belgian tennis player

- Full name: Bernard Mignot
- Country (sports): Belgium
- Born: 3 December 1948 (age 76); Verviers, Belgium
- Plays: Right-handed

Singles
- Career record: 36–48
- Career titles: 1
- Highest ranking: No. 73 (23 August 1973)

Grand Slam singles results
- French Open: 4R (1976)
- Wimbledon: 2R (1973)
- US Open: 1R (1975)

Doubles
- Career record: 13–26
- Career titles: 0

Grand Slam doubles results
- French Open: 3R (1972)
- Wimbledon: 2R (1972)

Bernard Mignot (born 3 December 1948) is a former professional tennis player from Belgium.

== Biography ==
Mignot was the first Belgian to win a Grand Prix or ATP title and the only one to do so for over 20-years. He defeated Jiří Hřebec in the final at Düsseldorf in 1974. A year earlier he had countryman Patrick Hombergen were runners-up in the doubles at Valencia, Spain.

He famously made the fourth round of the 1976 French Open, despite entering the draw as a last minute lucky loser. After losing in the final stage of the qualifiers, he had given up getting an opportunity to play in the tournament so spent the second day of the opening round touring Paris and visiting the cinema. When he arrived at Roland Garros, to watch his friends in action, he heard his name called out, "Bernard Mignot Last Call". New Zealand player Brian Fairlie had come down with food poisoning, so Mignot discovered that he was immediately required to go and play Fairlie's opponent, former quarter-finalist Paolo Bertolucci. Although his preparation had consisted of lunch at a pizza restaurant, Mignot was able to win in straight sets. He then beat José Edison Mandarino in a second round match which went to five sets and next faced Juan Gisbert, who had earlier accounted for 12th seed John Newcombe. In another five-set match, Mignot was victorious, to move into the fourth round. During the tournament, France was experiencing a heat wave and Mignot coped better with the conditions, as in both of his matches which went the distance he won the fifth set 6–0. His run ended with a straight sets loss to eventual semi-finalist Raúl Ramírez.

In Davis Cup competition for Belgium he had wins over Željko Franulović and Tom Okker. He later served as Belgium's Davis Cup captain for many years.

== Grand Prix career finals ==
=== Singles: 1 (1–0) ===
Result	W/L	Date	Tournament	Surface	Opponent	Score
Win	1–0	Jul 1974	Düsseldorf, West Germany	Clay	(Czechoslovakia) Jiří Hřebec	6–1, 6–0, 0–6, 6–4

=== Doubles: 1 (0–1) ===
Result	W/L	Date	Tournament	Surface	Partner	Opponents	Score
Loss	0–1	1973	Valencia, Spain	Clay	(Belgium) Patrick Hombergen	(United States) Mike Estep (Romania) Ion Țiriac	4–6, 6–1, 8–10

== See also ==
- List of Belgium Davis Cup team representatives
