= Per Hegna =

Norwegian tennis player (1945–2026)

- Country (sports): Norway
- Born: 22 July 1945
- Died: 22 March 2026 (aged 80)

Singles
- Career record: 16–22
- Highest ranking: No. 180 (12 Dec 1976)

Doubles
- Career record: 3–7
- Highest ranking: No. 346 (12 Dec 1976)

Per Hegna (22 July 1945 – 22 March 2026) was a Norwegian professional tennis player.

== Life and career ==
A native of Oslo, Hegna played out of the Berg Tennisklubb and won 26 national championships, including eight outdoor and six indoor singles titles. His Davis Cup career for Norway started in 1962 but most of his appearances came in the period of 1973 to 1983. He featured in 17 ties, for 15 wins across singles and doubles.

Hegna played collegiate tennis in the United States for the University of Wyoming. He featured in several Grand Prix tournaments during the 1970s, reaching a best singles world ranking of 180. As a main draw qualifier at the 1976 Swedish Open he upset seeded players Juan Gisbert and Julián Ganzábal en route to the quarter-finals.

Hegna died on 22 March 2026, at the age of 80.
