= Tom Christensen (tennis) =

Danish tennis player

- Country (sports): Denmark
- Born: 13 September 1949 (age 75)
- Plays: Right-handed

Singles
- Career record: 1–6
- Highest ranking: No. 146 (15 Oct 1973)

Grand Slam singles results
- Wimbledon: Q1 (1971)

Doubles
- Career record: 1–4

Tom Christensen (born 13 September 1949) is a former tennis player from Denmark.

== Tennis career ==
Christensen was a regular member of the Denmark Davis Cup team throughout the 1970s, making his debut in 1972 against Finland during the Europe Zone first round tie. During his Davis Cup career, he won 5 of the 13 singles matches and 7 of the 8 doubles matches that he played.

== See also ==
- List of Denmark Davis Cup team representatives
