= Nick Fleury =

Dutch tennis player

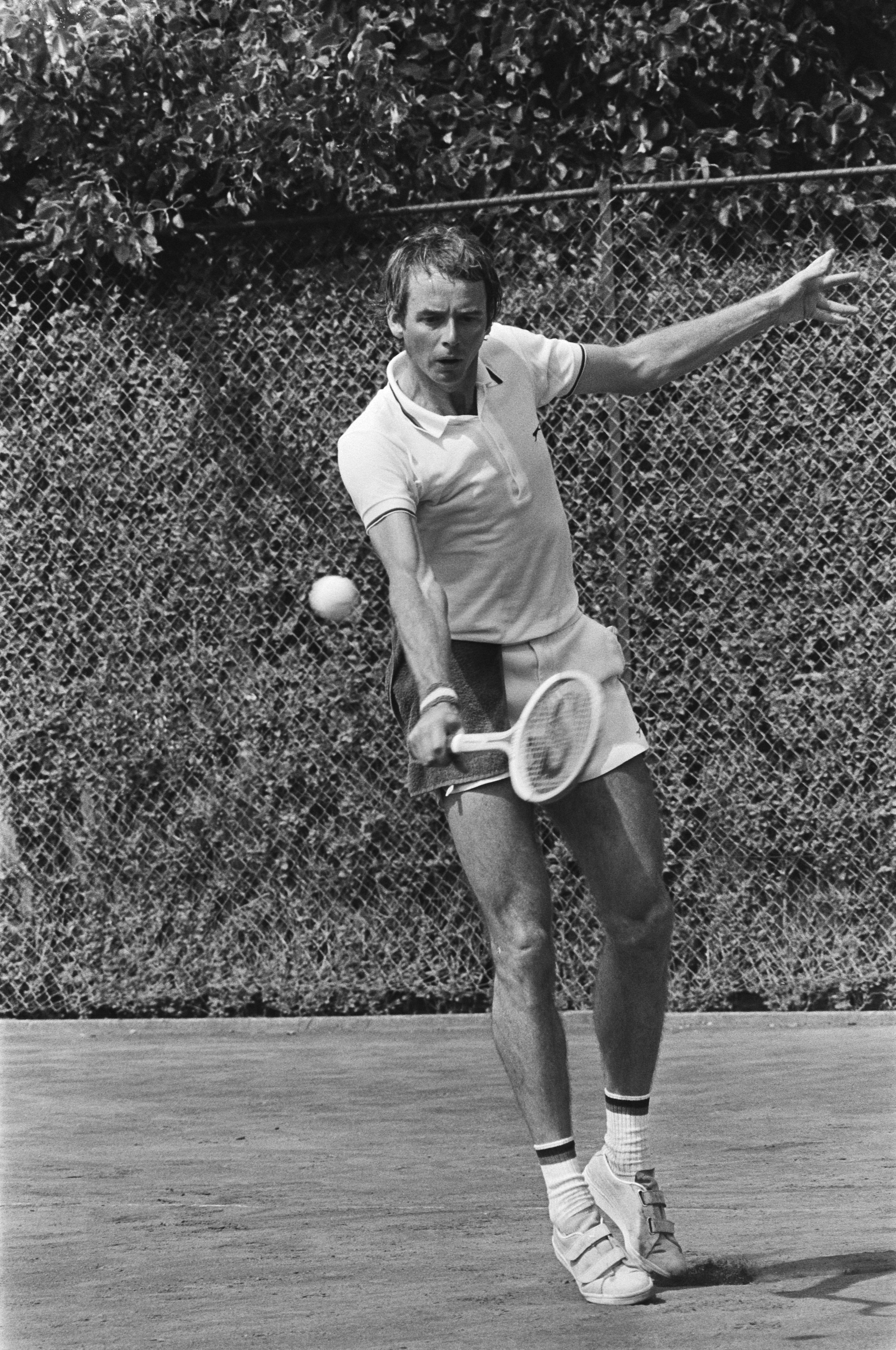
- Full name: Niklaus Fleury
- Country (sports): Netherlands
- Born: 10 May 1945 (age 80)
- Turned pro: 1965 (amateur circuit); 1969
- Retired: 1978
- Plays: Right-handed

Singles
- Career record: 14–24
- Career titles: 2

Doubles
- Career record: 1–6 (ATP Tour & Davis Cup)

Grand Slam mixed doubles results
- Wimbledon: 1R (1967)

Niklaus Fleury (born 10 May 1945) is a Dutch former professional tennis player. He was active from 1965 to 1978 and won 2 career singles titles.

== Career ==
he played his first tournament at the Netherlands National Championships in 1965 where he reached the quarter finals, but lost to Jan Hajer. In 1967 he won his first singles title at the Tilburg International Indoor tournament against Jan Hajer. In 1969 Fleury won his second and final title at the Netherlands National Championships against Evert Schneider, and made his Davis Cup debut that year, going on to feature in six ties for his country. He also won a further seven men's doubles national titles with Jan Hordijk (all in succession) and another five in mixed doubles. In 1967 he featured in the mixed doubles main draw at Wimbledon. He played his final singles event in 1978 playing for the Netherlands Masters, that was part the Netherlands 1 Satellite Circuit.

== See also ==
- List of Netherlands Davis Cup team representatives
