= Peter Pokorny (tennis) =

Austrian tennis player (born 1940)

- Country (sports): Austria
- Born: 25 July 1940 (age 85) Graz, Austria
- Plays: Left-handed

Singles
- Career record: 8–25
- Highest ranking: No. 221 (14 June 1976)

Grand Slam singles results
- French Open: 2R (1971)
- Wimbledon: 1R (1966, 1969, 1973)

Doubles
- Career record: 5–18

Grand Slam doubles results
- French Open: 1R (1971)
- Wimbledon: 1R (1970, 1971, 1972, 1973)

Peter Pokorny (born 25 July 1940) is a former professional Austrian tennis player who was active in the 1960s and 1970s.

His best singles result at a Grand Slam tournament was reaching the second round at the 1971 French Open after a first round win against Bob Giltinan. In the second round he lost to Nicola Pietrangeli in four sets. At Wimbledon he qualified for the main singles draw in 1966, 1969 and 1973 but did not manage to make it past the first round.

In 1973 he won the singles title at the international German indoor championships in Bremen after a five-sets victory in the final against Tadeusz Nowicki.

Pokorny played in 14 ties for the Austrian Davis Cup team between 1963 and 1974 and had a 8–25 win–loss record.

As a senior player Pokorny won many European and World Championships.
