= Pekka Säilä =

Finnish tennis player (1941–2009)

- Country (sports): Finland
- Born: 20 December 1941 Helsinki, Finland
- Died: 7 December 2009 (aged 67) Helsinki, Finland
- Turned pro: 1962 (amateur tour)

Singles
- Career record: 4–9
- Highest ranking: No. 272 (14 Jun 1976)

Grand Slam singles results
- Wimbledon: 3R (1967)

Doubles
- Career record: 1–2

Grand Slam mixed doubles results
- Wimbledon: 3R (1966)

Pekka Säilä (20 December 1941 – 7 December 2009) was a tennis player from Finland.

== Tennis career ==
Säilä made his debut for the Finland Davis Cup team during the 1962 Europe Zone second round tie against Czechoslovakia. During his sixteen-year Davis Cup career, he played in twenty-three Davis Cup singles rubbers, seven of which he won, and he also played in thirteen doubles rubbers, with two wins.

During 1967, Säilä was recruited to attend college in the United States at Oral Roberts University in Tulsa, Oklahoma. He played for the university tennis team and graduated in 1970.

Säilä participated at the Wimbledon Championships on two occasions, with a best result of reaching the third round in 1967, before losing to the British player, Roger Taylor.

== See also ==
- List of Finland Davis Cup team representatives
