= George Berner =

Finnish tennis player (born 1944)

- Full name: George Luis Sören Berner
- Country (sports): Finland
- Born: 4 April 1948 (age 78) Helsinki, Finland
- Turned pro: 1966 (amateur tour)
- Plays: Right–handed

Singles
- Highest ranking: No. 318 (20 Dec 1974)

Grand Slam singles results
- Wimbledon: Q2 (1972)

Doubles
- Highest ranking: No. 455 (03 Jan 1983)

George Luis Sören Berner (born 4 April 1944) is a former tennis player from Finland.

== Tennis career ==
Berner attended college in the United States at Davidson College in North Carolina during 1967 and 1968.

Berner was a regular member of the Finland Davis Cup team for the period 1969 to 1981. He made his debut in the 1969 Europe Zone A first round tie against Sweden. His last appearance was as a doubles player in the 1981 Europe Zone B semi-final against the Netherlands. Berner played in twenty Davis Cup singles rubbers, ten of which he won, and he also played in ten doubles rubbers, with two wins.

Berner participated in the Wimbledon qualifying draw on two occasions, in 1969 and 1972, with a best effort in reaching the second round of qualifying in 1972.

== See also ==
- List of Finland Davis Cup team representatives
