= Raúl Peralta =

Argentine-Portuguese tennis player

- Country (sports): Argentina; Portugal
- Born: 17 June 1940 (age 84)

Singles

Grand Slam singles results
- French Open: 2R (1966)
- Wimbledon: 1R (1968)

Grand Slam mixed doubles results
- French Open: 1R (1969)

Raúl Peralta (born 17 June 1940) is an Argentine-Portuguese former professional tennis player.

Born in Argentina, Peralta competed for his native country originally but married Portuguese Federation Cup player Leonora Santos and had switched allegiance to Portugal by 1970.

Peralta featured in eight Davis Cup ties for Portugal, between 1970 and 1977. He also played in the main draws of the French Open and Wimbledon during his career.

== See also ==
- List of Portugal Davis Cup team representatives
