= Egypt Davis Cup team =

Egyptian national tennis team

- Nations Ranking: 59 (6 December 2021)
- First year: 1929
- Years played: 77
- Ties played (W–L): 159 (79–80)
- Most total wins: Karim Maamoun (30-31)
- Most singles wins: Mohamed Safwat (22-12)
- Most doubles wins: Sherif Sabry (13-11)
- Best doubles team: Aly El Dawoudi & Ismail El Shafei (5-3); Karim Maamoun & Mohamed Mamoun (5-6)
- Most ties played: Karim Maamoun & Sherif Sabry 31
- Most years played: Amro Ghoneim & Sherif Sabry 13

The Egypt men's national tennis team represents Egypt in Davis Cup tennis competition and are governed by the Egyptian Tennis Federation.

Egypt currently compete in the Europe/Africa Zone of Group II. They reached the semifinals of Group I in 1982 and 1985.

== History ==
Egypt competed in its first Davis Cup in 1929. The team reached the semi-finals twice.

== Current team (2022) ==
- Mohamed Safwat
- Amr Elsayed
- Karim-Mohamed Maamoun
- Michael Bassem Sobhy
- Faris Zakaryia

== Performance ==
=== 2010s ===
Year	Competition	Date	Location	Opponent	Score
2010	Group II Europe/Africa 1st Round	05 Mar-07 Mar	Limassol (CYP)	Cyprus	2–3
2010	Group II Europe/Africa Relegation Play-off	09 Jul–11 Jul	Cairo (EGY)	Denmark	0–5

=== 2000s ===
Year	Competition	Date	Location	Opponent	Score
2000			Cairo (EGY)	Slovenia	2–3
2000			Tallinn (EST)	Estonia	0–5
2001			Rose Hill (MRI)	Bosnia and Herzegovina	2–1
2001			Rose Hill (MRI)	Mauritius	3-0
2001			Rose Hill (MRI)	(North Macedonia) Macedonia	2-1
2001			Rose Hill (MRI)	Bulgaria	1-2
2002			Asker (NOR)	Norway	1–4
2002			Cairo (EGY)	Moldova	5–0
2003			Dublin (IRE)	(Republic of Ireland) Ireland	1–4
2003			Andorra La Vella (AND)	Andorra	3–2
2004			Sofia (BUL)	Bulgaria	0–5
2004			Tbilisi (GEO)	(Georgia (country)) Georgia	2–3
2005			Cairo (EGY)	Madagascar	3–0
2005			Cairo (EGY)	Bosnia and Herzegovina	3–0
2005			Cairo (EGY)	Lithuania	2–1
2005			Cairo (EGY)	Denmark	2–1
2005			Cairo (EGY)	(North Macedonia) Macedonia	1–2
2005			Cairo (EGY)	Bosnia and Herzegovina	3–0

== See also ==
- Davis Cup
- Egypt Billie Jean King Cup team
