= Patrick Hombergen =

Belgian tennis player

- Full name: Patrick Hombergen
- Country (sports): Belgium
- Born: 8 September 1946 (age 79) Brussels, Belgium

Singles
- Career record: 27–41
- Career titles: 0
- Highest ranking: No. 115 (13 September 1973)

Grand Slam singles results
- Australian Open: 2R (1967)
- French Open: 2R (1969, 1970, 1971, 1972)
- Wimbledon: 3R (1972)

Doubles
- Career record: 12–20
- Career titles: 0

Grand Slam doubles results
- Australian Open: 1R (1967)
- French Open: 3R (1970, 1972)
- Wimbledon: 2R (1968)

Patrick Hombergen (born 8 September 1946) is a former professional tennis player from Belgium.

== Biography ==
Hombergen was a regular Davis Cup representative for Belgium, the fourth to feature in 20 ties. From 1966 to 1980 he played in a total of 21 ties and had a 26/31 overall record, 15/24 in singles and 11/7 in doubles. He won a five set match over Jan Kodeš in Brussels in 1968, from two sets down.

In Grand Slam competition he had his best results in 1972 when he made the second round of the French Open and third round of the Wimbledon Championships. At the 1972 French Open he also reached the third round of the doubles with Davis Cup teammate Bernard Mignot and en route the Belgians caused an upset with a win over the second seeded pairing of Ilie Năstase and Ion Țiriac.

His career on the Grand Prix circuit involved four quarter-final appearances, three in 1972, at Brussels, Gstaad and Hilversum. The other came at Barcelona in 1973 and that year he also made a doubles final, with Bernard Mignot in Valencia, which they lost to Mike Estep and Ion Țiriac.

== Grand Prix career finals ==
=== Doubles: 1 (0–1) ===
Result	W/L	Year	Tournament	Surface	Partner	Opponents	Score
Loss	0–1	Apr 1973	Valencia, Spain	Clay	(Belgium) Bernard Mignot	(United States) Mike Estep (Romania) Ion Țiriac	4–6, 6–1, 8–10

== See also ==
- List of Belgium Davis Cup team representatives
