= Aly El Dawoudi =

Egyptian tennis player (born 1949)

- Country (sports): Egypt
- Born: September 25, 1949 (age 75)

Singles
- Highest ranking: No. 222 (December 15, 1975)

Doubles

Grand Slam doubles results
- French Open: 1R (1975)

Aly El Dawoudi (Arabic: علي الداوودي; born September 25, 1949) is a former Egyptian tennis Davis Cup player.

== See also ==
- Egyptian Tennis Federation
