= 1969 Davis Cup Europe Zone =

International tennis competition

The Europe Zone was one of the three regional zones of the 1969 Davis Cup.

32 teams entered the Europe Zone, competing across 2 sub-zones. The winners of each sub-zone went on to compete in the Inter-Zonal Zone against the winners of the Americas Zone and Eastern Zone.

Great Britain defeated South Africa in the Zone A final, and Romania defeated the Soviet Union in the Zone B final, resulting in both Great Britain and Romania progressing to the Inter-Zonal Zone.

== Zone A ==
=== Draw ===
First Round; 24 April–11 May
Cologne, West Germany
West Germany | 4
New Zealand | 1
Helsinki, Finland (clay)
Finland | 1
Sweden | 4
Zürich, Switzerland (clay)
Switzerland | 0
Great Britain | 5
Cork, Ireland
Ireland | 5
Luxembourg | 0
Monte Carlo, Monaco
Monaco | 3
Bulgaria | 2
Copenhagen, Denmark (clay)
Denmark | 2
Czechoslovakia | 3
Warsaw, Poland
Poland | 3
Hungary | 2
Cape Town, South Africa
Iran | 0
South Africa | 5

Quarterfinals; 22–26 May
Båstad, Sweden (clay)
West Germany | 4
Sweden | 1
Eastbourne, England (grass)
Great Britain | 5
Ireland | 0
Monte Carlo, Monaco (clay)
Monaco | 0
Czechoslovakia | 5
Poland
South Africa | w/o

Semifinals; 12–14 June
Birmingham, England (grass)
West Germany | 2
Great Britain | 3
Czechoslovakia
South Africa | w/o

Final; 17–19 July
Bristol, England (grass)
Great Britain | 3
South Africa | 2

=== First round ===
==== West Germany vs. New Zealand ====
West Germany
4
Cologne, West Germany
9–11 May 1969

New Zealand
1

| | | | 1 | 2 | 3 | 4 | 5 |
|---|---|---|---|---|---|---|---|
| 1 | (West Germany) (New Zealand) | Wilhelm Bungert; Onny Parun | 6; 4 | 9; 7 | 6; 0 |
| 2 | (West Germany) (New Zealand) | Christian Kuhnke; Brian Fairlie | 6; 3 | 6; 1 | 6; 4 |
| 3 | (West Germany) (New Zealand) | Ingo Buding / Christian Kuhnke; Brian Fairlie / Onny Parun | 6; 2 | 6; 3 | 6; 4 |
| 4 | (West Germany) (New Zealand) | Wilhelm Bungert; Brian Fairlie | 0; 6 | 5; 7 | 0; 6 |
| 5 | (West Germany) (New Zealand) | Christian Kuhnke; Onny Parun | 7; 5 | 6; 4 | 3; 6 | 6; 4 |

==== Finland vs. Sweden ====
Finland
1
Helsingfors Lawn Tennisklubb, Helsinki, Finland
9–11 May 1969
Clay

Sweden
4

| | | | 1 | 2 | 3 | 4 | 5 |
|---|---|---|---|---|---|---|---|
| 1 | (Finland) (Sweden) | George Berner; Ove Bengtson | 7; 5 | 2; 6 | 3; 6 | 4; 6 |
| 2 | (Finland) (Sweden) | Heikki Hedman; Hans Nerell | 2; 6 | 0; 6 | 4; 6 |
| 3 | (Finland) (Sweden) | George Berner / Heikki Hedman; Ove Bengtson / Martin Carlstein | 0; 6 | 2; 6 | 3; 6 |
| 4 | (Finland) (Sweden) | George Berner; Hans Nerell | 3; 6 | 6; 4 | 6; 1 | 6; 3 |
| 5 | (Finland) (Sweden) | Heikki Hedman; Ove Bengtson | 4; 6 | 0; 6 | 3; 6 |

==== Switzerland vs. Great Britain ====
Switzerland
0
Zürich, Switzerland
9–11 May 1969
Clay

Great Britain
5

| | | | 1 | 2 | 3 | 4 | 5 |
|---|---|---|---|---|---|---|---|
| 1 | (Switzerland) (United Kingdom) | Theodor Stalder; Mark Cox | 4; 6 | 6; 8 | 2; 6 |
| 2 | (Switzerland) (United Kingdom) | Dimitri Sturdza; Graham Stilwell | 6; 8 | 4; 6 | 1; 6 |
| 3 | (Switzerland) (United Kingdom) | Dimitri Sturdza / Matthias Werren; Mark Cox / Peter Curtis | 1; 6 | 3; 6 | 3; 6 |
| 4 | (Switzerland) (United Kingdom) | Dimitri Sturdza; Mark Cox | 3; 6 | 0; 6 | 6; 4 | 2; 6 |
| 5 | (Switzerland) (United Kingdom) | Theodor Stalder; Graham Stilwell | 2; 6 | 0; 6 | 2; 6 |

==== Ireland vs. Luxembourg ====
Ireland
5
Cork, Ireland
9–11 May 1969

Luxembourg
0

| | | | 1 | 2 | 3 | 4 | 5 |
|---|---|---|---|---|---|---|---|
| 1 | (Republic of Ireland) (Luxembourg) | Michael Hickey; Thierry Brasseur | 5; 7 | 6; 3 | 6; 4 | 6; 4 |
| 2 | (Republic of Ireland) (Luxembourg) | Peter Jackson; Jean Neuman | 8; 6 | 7; 5 | 6; 2 |
| 3 | (Republic of Ireland) (Luxembourg) | Michael Hickey / Peter Jackson; Frank Baden / Thierry Brasseur | 6; 2 | 18; 16 | 8; 6 |
| 4 | (Republic of Ireland) (Luxembourg) | Peter Jackson; Thierry Brasseur | 6; 4 | 6; 1 | 6; 3 |
| 5 | (Republic of Ireland) (Luxembourg) | Michael Hickey; Jean Neuman | 6; 2 | 7; 5 | 6; 2 |

==== Monaco vs. Bulgaria ====
Monaco
3
Monte Carlo, Monaco
9–11 May 1969

Bulgaria
2

| | | | 1 | 2 | 3 | 4 | 5 |
|---|---|---|---|---|---|---|---|
| 1 | (Monaco) (Bulgaria) | Patrick Landau; Ljuben Genov | 7; 5 | 10; 12 | 6; 2 | 4; 6 | 6; 4 |
| 2 | (Monaco) (Bulgaria) | Adrien Viviani; Kiril Yashmakov | 3; 6 | 6; 3 | 6; 2 | 2; 6 | 1; 6 |
| 3 | (Monaco) (Bulgaria) | Patrick Landau / Francis Truchi; Bozhidar Pampoulov / Matei Pampoulov | 6; 3 | 3; 6 | 2; 6 | 7; 5 | 6; 2 |
| 4 | (Monaco) (Bulgaria) | Patrick Landau; Kiril Yashmakov | 7; 5 | 6; 2 | 3; 6 | 7; 5 |
| 5 | (Monaco) (Bulgaria) | Adrien Viviani; Ljuben Genov | 6; 8 | 8; 6 | 6; 8 | 5; 7 |

==== Denmark vs. Czechoslovakia ====
Denmark
2
Copenhagen, Denmark
9–11 May 1969
Clay

Czechoslovakia
3

| | | | 1 | 2 | 3 | 4 | 5 |
|---|---|---|---|---|---|---|---|
| 1 | (Denmark) (Czechoslovakia) | Jan Leschly; Jan Kodeš | 2; 6 | 2; 6 | 3; 6 |
| 2 | (Denmark) (Czechoslovakia) | Jørgen Ulrich; Milan Holeček | 0; 6 | 6; 4 | 6; 4 | 3; 6 | 7; 5 |
| 3 | (Denmark) (Czechoslovakia) | Jan Leschly / Jørgen Ulrich; Jan Kodeš / Jan Kukal | 6; 8 | 11; 9 | 2; 6 | 4; 6 |
| 4 | (Denmark) (Czechoslovakia) | Jørgen Ulrich; Jan Kodeš | 2; 6 | 2; 6 | 4; 6 |
| 5 | (Denmark) (Czechoslovakia) | Jan Leschly; Milan Holeček | 6; 0 | 3; 6 | 7; 5 | 6; 2 |

==== Poland vs. Hungary ====
Poland
3
Warsaw, Poland
9–11 May 1969

Hungary
2

| | | | 1 | 2 | 3 | 4 | 5 |
|---|---|---|---|---|---|---|---|
| 1 | (Poland) (Hungary) | Wiesław Gąsiorek; Péter Szőke | 7; 9 | 6; 4 | 7; 9 | 6; 0 | 6; 2 |
| 2 | (Poland) (Hungary) | Mieczysław Rybarczyk; István Gulyás | 6; 4 | 6; 4 | 7; 5 |
| 3 | (Poland) (Hungary) | Tadeusz Nowicki / Mieczysław Rybarczyk; Szabolcs Baranyi / Róbert Machán | 3; 6 | 4; 6 | 4; 6 |
| 4 | (Poland) (Hungary) | Mieczysław Rybarczyk; Péter Szőke | 11; 9 | 6; 4 | 3; 6 | 6; 4 |
| 5 | (Poland) (Hungary) | Wiesław Gąsiorek; István Gulyás | 6; 8 | 4; 6 | 6; 1 | 6; 3 | 3; 6 |

==== South Africa vs. Iran ====
South Africa
5
Rondebosch, Cape Town, South Africa
24–26 April 1969

Iran
0

| | | | 1 | 2 | 3 | 4 | 5 |
|---|---|---|---|---|---|---|---|
| 1 | (South Africa) (Iran) | Bob Maud; Taghi Akbari | 6; 4 | 6; 3 | 8; 6 |
| 2 | (South Africa) (Iran) | Bob Hewitt; Issa Khodaei | 6; 3 | 6; 1 | 6; 1 |
| 3 | (South Africa) (Iran) | Bob Hewitt / Frew McMillan; Issa Khodaei / Ezzatollah Nemati | 6; 2 | 6; 0 | 6; 1 |
| 4 | (South Africa) (Iran) | Bob Maud; Issa Khodaei | 6; 1 | 6; 0 | 6; 1 |
| 5 | (South Africa) (Iran) | Bob Hewitt; Taghi Akbari | 6; 4 | 6; 3 | 6; 3 |

=== Quarterfinals ===
==== Sweden vs. West Germany ====
Sweden
1
Båstad Tennis Stadium, Båstad, Sweden
24–26 May 1969
Clay

West Germany
4

| | | | 1 | 2 | 3 | 4 | 5 |
|---|---|---|---|---|---|---|---|
| 1 | (Sweden) (West Germany) | Ove Bengtson; Christian Kuhnke | 3; 6 | 5; 7 | 3; 6 |
| 2 | (Sweden) (West Germany) | Jan-Erik Lundqvist; Wilhelm Bungert | 3; 6 | 4; 6 | 4; 6 |
| 3 | (Sweden) (West Germany) | Ove Bengtson / Hans Nerell; Ingo Buding / Christian Kuhnke | 6; 3 | 6; 3 | 6; 3 |
| 4 | (Sweden) (West Germany) | Ove Bengtson; Wilhelm Bungert | 11; 9 | 3; 6 | 4; 6 | 1; 6 |
| 5 | (Sweden) (West Germany) | Jan-Erik Lundqvist; Christian Kuhnke | 6; 3 | 6; 3 | 4; 6 | 7; 9 | 3; 6 |

==== Great Britain vs. Ireland ====
Great Britain
5
Devonshire Park Lawn Tennis Club, Eastbourne, England
22–24 May 1969
Grass

Ireland
0

| | | | 1 | 2 | 3 | 4 | 5 |
|---|---|---|---|---|---|---|---|
| 1 | (United Kingdom) (Republic of Ireland) | Graham Stilwell; Peter Jackson | 6; 2 | 6; 2 | 6; 1 |
| 2 | (United Kingdom) (Republic of Ireland) | Mark Cox; Michael Hickey | 6; 2 | 6; 2 | 6; 3 |
| 3 | (United Kingdom) (Republic of Ireland) | Mark Cox / Peter Curtis; Michael Hickey / Peter Jackson | 6; 2 | 6; 3 | 6; 2 |
| 4 | (United Kingdom) (Republic of Ireland) | Mark Cox; Peter Jackson | 6; 3 | 6; 2 | 6; 1 |
| 5 | (United Kingdom) (Republic of Ireland) | Graham Stilwell; Michael Hickey | 8; 6 | 6; 4 | 6; 1 |

==== Monaco vs. Czechoslovakia ====
Monaco
0
Monte Carlo, Monaco
23–25 May 1969
Clay

Czechoslovakia
5

| | | | 1 | 2 | 3 | 4 | 5 |
|---|---|---|---|---|---|---|---|
| 1 | (Monaco) (Czechoslovakia) | René Ruzic; Jan Kukal | 1; 6 | 2; 6 | 1; 6 |
| 2 | (Monaco) (Czechoslovakia) | Francis Truchi; Vladimír Zedník | 1; 6 | 1; 6 | 1; 6 |
| 3 | (Monaco) (Czechoslovakia) | Francis Truchi / André Vatrican; Jan Kodeš / Jan Kukal | 0; 6 | 1; 6 | 2; 6 |
| 4 | (Monaco) (Czechoslovakia) | Adrien Viviani; Vladimír Zedník | 0; 6 | 5; 7 | 3; 6 |
| 5 | (Monaco) (Czechoslovakia) | André Vatrican; Jan Kukal | 1; 6 | 1; 6 | 0; 6 |

=== Semifinals ===
==== Great Britain vs. West Germany ====
Great Britain
3
Edgbaston Priory Club, Birmingham, England
12–14 June 1969
Grass

West Germany
2

| | | | 1 | 2 | 3 | 4 | 5 |
|---|---|---|---|---|---|---|---|
| 1 | (United Kingdom) (West Germany) | Mark Cox; Christian Kuhnke | 4; 6 | 6; 3 | 6; 4 | 6; 2 |
| 2 | (United Kingdom) (West Germany) | Graham Stilwell; Wilhelm Bungert | 9; 7 | 6; 3 | 7; 5 |
| 3 | (United Kingdom) (West Germany) | Mark Cox / Peter Curtis; Wilhelm Bungert / Christian Kuhnke | 8; 10 | 19; 17 | 11; 13 | 6; 3 | 2; 6 |
| 4 | (United Kingdom) (West Germany) | Graham Stilwell; Christian Kuhnke | 4; 6 | 12; 14 | 5; 7 |
| 5 | (United Kingdom) (West Germany) | Mark Cox; Wilhelm Bungert | 6; 3 | 2; 6 | 8; 10 | 7; 5 | 6; 2 |

=== Final ===
==== Great Britain vs. South Africa ====
Great Britain
3
Bristol Lawn Tennis Club, Bristol, England
17–19 July 1969
Grass

South Africa
2

| | | | 1 | 2 | 3 | 4 | 5 |
|---|---|---|---|---|---|---|---|
| 1 | (United Kingdom) (South Africa) | Mark Cox; Bob Maud | 3; 6 | 6; 3 | 6; 4 | 3; 6 | 6; 4 |
| 2 | (United Kingdom) (South Africa) | Graham Stilwell; Bob Hewitt | 9; 7 | 3; 6 | 6; 3 | 2; 6 | 3; 6 |
| 3 | (United Kingdom) (South Africa) | Mark Cox / Peter Curtis; Bob Hewitt / Frew McMillan | 6; 4 | 3; 6 | 4; 6 | 6; 4 | 9; 7 |
| 4 | (United Kingdom) (South Africa) | Graham Stilwell; Bob Maud | 8; 6 | 11; 9 | 6; 3 |
| 5 | (United Kingdom) (South Africa) | Mark Cox; Bob Hewitt | 6; 3 | 0; 6 | 6; 4 | 3; 6 | 7; 9 |

== Zone B ==
=== Draw ===
First Round; 4–12 May
Lisbon, Portugal (clay)
Spain | 5
Rhodesia | 0
Maribor, Yugoslavia
Yugoslavia | 3
France | 2
Bucharest, Romania (clay)
Romania | 3
Egypt | 2
Lisbon, Portugal (clay)
Portugal | 1
Israel | 4
Athens, Greece
Greece | 0
Soviet Union | 5
Scheveningen, Netherlands (clay)
Netherlands | 2
Canada | 3
Oslo, Norway (clay)
Norway | 0
Austria | 5
Genoa, Italy (clay)
Belgium | 1
Italy | 4

Quarterfinals; 22–25 May
Zagreb, Yugoslavia (clay)
Spain | 5
Yugoslavia | 0
Bucharest, Romania (clay)
Romania | 5
Israel | 0
Moscow, Soviet Union (clay)
Soviet Union | 4
Canada | 1
Barletta, Italy (clay)
Austria | 0
Italy | 5

Semifinals; 13–15 June
Valencia, Spain (clay)
Spain | 1
Romania | 4
Moscow, Soviet Union
Soviet Union | 5
Italy | 0

Final; 18–20 July
Bucharest, Romania (clay)
Romania | 4
Soviet Union | 1

=== First round ===
==== Rhodesia vs. Spain ====
Rhodesia
0
Estádio Nacional, Lisbon, Portugal
4–6 May 1969
Clay

Spain
5

| | | | 1 | 2 | 3 | 4 | 5 |
|---|---|---|---|---|---|---|---|
| 1 | (Rhodesia) (Spain) | Frank Saloman; Manuel Orantes | 2; 6 | 5; 7 | 6; 8 |
| 2 | (Rhodesia) (Spain) | Douglas Irvine; Manuel Santana | 2; 6 | 1; 6 | 3; 6 |
| 3 | (Rhodesia) (Spain) | Alan Saloman / Frank Saloman; Manuel Orantes / Manuel Santana | 3; 6 | 3; 6 | 4; 6 |
| 4 | (Rhodesia) (Spain) | Douglas Irvine; José María Gisbert | 3; 6 | 4; 6 | 5; 7 |
| 5 | (Rhodesia) (Spain) | Frank Saloman; Manuel Santana | 0; 6 | 2; 6 | 2; 6 |

==== Yugoslavia vs. France ====
Yugoslavia
3
Maribor, Yugoslavia
10–12 May 1969

France
2

| | | | 1 | 2 | 3 | 4 | 5 |
|---|---|---|---|---|---|---|---|
| 1 | (Socialist Federal Republic of Yugoslavia) (France) | Nikola Špear; François Jauffret | 3; 6 | 2; 6 | 1; 6 |
| 2 | (Socialist Federal Republic of Yugoslavia) (France) | Željko Franulović; Georges Goven | 6; 3 | 6; 3 | 7; 5 |
| 3 | (Socialist Federal Republic of Yugoslavia) (France) | Željko Franulović / Nikola Špear; Patrice Beust / Daniel Contet | 6; 2 | 6; 2 | 6; 4 |
| 4 | (Socialist Federal Republic of Yugoslavia) (France) | Nikola Špear; Georges Goven | 3; 6 | 2; 6 | 1; 6 |
| 5 | (Socialist Federal Republic of Yugoslavia) (France) | Željko Franulović; François Jauffret | 6; 3 | 6; 3 | 6; 3 |

==== Romania vs. Egypt ====
Romania
3
Bucharest, Romania
9–11 May 1969
Clay

Egypt
2

| | | | 1 | 2 | 3 | 4 | 5 |
|---|---|---|---|---|---|---|---|
| 1 | (Romania) (Egypt) | Ion Țiriac; Ismail El Shafei | 3; 6 | 3; 6 | 3; 6 |
| 2 | (Romania) (Egypt) | Ilie Năstase; Moataz El Sonbol | 6; 4 | 6; 0 | 6; 4 |
| 3 | (Romania) (Egypt) | Ilie Năstase / Ion Țiriac; Ismail El Shafei / Moataz El Sonbol | 6; 3 | 6; 4 | 6; 0 |
| 4 | (Romania) (Egypt) | Ion Țiriac; Moataz El Sonbol | 6; 4 | 3; 6 | 6; 4 | 6; 3 |
| 5 | (Romania) (Egypt) | Ilie Năstase; Ismail El Shafei | 2; 6 | 6; 1 | 3; 6 | 1; 6 |

==== Portugal vs. Israel ====
Portugal
1
Estádio Nacional, Lisbon, Portugal
9–11 May 1969
Clay

Israel
4

| | | | 1 | 2 | 3 | 4 | 5 |
|---|---|---|---|---|---|---|---|
| 1 | (Portugal) (Israel) | João Lagos; Josef Stabholz | 2; 6 | 3; 6 | 0; 6 |
| 2 | (Portugal) (Israel) | Alfredo Vaz Pinto; Eleazar Davidman | 2; 6 | 6; 4 | 6; 3 | 5; 7 | 3; 6 |
| 3 | (Portugal) (Israel) | João Roquette / Alfredo Vaz Pinto; Eleazar Davidman / Ian Froman | 3; 6 | 0; 6 | 1; 6 |
| 4 | (Portugal) (Israel) | Alfredo Vaz Pinto; Josef Stabholz | 6; 1 | 6; 4 | 6; 4 |
| 5 | (Portugal) (Israel) | Olivio Silva; Eleazar Davidman | 2; 6 | 0; 6 | 1; 6 |

==== Greece vs. Soviet Union ====
Greece
0
Athens, Greece
9–11 May 1969

Soviet Union
5

| | | | 1 | 2 | 3 | 4 | 5 |
|---|---|---|---|---|---|---|---|---|
| 1 | (Greece) (Soviet Union) | Periclis Gavrilidis; Alex Metreveli | 0; 6 | 1; 6 | 1; 6 |
| 2 | (Greece) (Soviet Union) | Nicholas Kalogeropoulos; Toomas Leius | 7; 5 | 6; 3 | 4; 6 | 2; 6 | 0; 4 | retired |
| 3 | (Greece) (Soviet Union) | Epaminondas Argyriou / Nicholas Kalogeropoulos; Sergei Likhachev / Alex Metreveli | 2; 6 | 2; 6 | 6; 3 | 2; 6 |
| 4 | (Greece) (Soviet Union) | Periclis Gavrilidis; Toomas Leius | 1; 6 | 6; 1 | 4; 6 | 4; 6 |
| 5 | (Greece) (Soviet Union) | Epaminondas Argyriou; Vladimir Korotkov | 2; 6 | 3; 6 |

==== Netherlands vs. Canada ====
Netherlands
2
Scheveningen, Netherlands
9–11 May 1969
Clay

Canada
3

| | | | 1 | 2 | 3 | 4 | 5 |
|---|---|---|---|---|---|---|---|
| 1 | (Netherlands) (Canada) | Jan Hordijk; François Godbout | 6; 1 | 6; 2 | 6; 1 |
| 2 | (Netherlands) (Canada) | Niklaus Fleury; Mike Belkin | 4; 6 | 4; 6 | 0; 6 |
| 3 | (Netherlands) (Canada) | Niklaus Fleury / Jan Hordijk; Mike Belkin / Henry Fauquier | 4; 6 | 4; 6 | 7; 5 | 2; 6 |
| 4 | (Netherlands) (Canada) | Niklaus Fleury; François Godbout | 7; 5 | 6; 2 | 6; 8 | 6; 3 |
| 5 | (Netherlands) (Canada) | Jan Hordijk; Mike Belkin | 1; 6 | 1; 6 | 2; 6 |

==== Norway vs. Austria ====
Norway
0
Oslo, Norway
9–11 May 1969
Clay

Austria
5

| | | | 1 | 2 | 3 | 4 | 5 |
|---|---|---|---|---|---|---|---|
| 1 | (Norway) (Austria) | Jon-Erik Ross; Ernst Blanke | 2; 6 | 4; 6 | 4; 6 |
| 2 | (Norway) (Austria) | Finn-Dag Jagge; Detlef Herdy | 1; 6 | 4; 6 | 1; 6 |
| 3 | (Norway) (Austria) | Sjur Lars Galtung-Hansen / Jon-Erik Ross; Ernst Blanke / Detlef Herdy | 2; 6 | 5; 7 | 1; 6 |
| 4 | (Norway) (Austria) | Finn-Dag Jagge; Ernst Blanke | 2; 6 | 2; 6 | 6; 4 | 3; 6 |
| 5 | (Norway) (Austria) | Jon-Erik Ross; Detlef Herdy | 2; 6 | 4; 6 | 0; 6 |

==== Italy vs. Belgium ====
Italy
4
Genoa, Italy
9–11 May 1969
Clay

Belgium
1

| | | | 1 | 2 | 3 | 4 | 5 |
|---|---|---|---|---|---|---|---|
| 1 | (Italy) (Belgium) | Nicola Pietrangeli; Patrick Hombergen | 6; 3 | 6; 2 | 6; 3 |
| 2 | (Italy) (Belgium) | Eugenio Castigliano; Eric Drossart | 6; 4 | 4; 6 | 6; 4 | 5; 7 | 6; 1 |
| 3 | (Italy) (Belgium) | Vittorio Crotta / Pietro Marzano; Eric Drossart / Patrick Hombergen | 2; 6 | 3; 6 | 5; 7 |
| 4 | (Italy) (Belgium) | Nicola Pietrangeli; Eric Drossart | 7; 5 | 6; 4 | 7; 9 | 6; 4 |
| 5 | (Italy) (Belgium) | Eugenio Castigliano; Patrick Hombergen | 3; 6 | 6; 3 | 6; 4 | 6; 4 |

=== Quarterfinals ===
==== Yugoslavia vs. Spain ====
Yugoslavia
0
Zagreb, Yugoslavia
23–25 May 1969
Clay

Spain
5

| | | | 1 | 2 | 3 | 4 | 5 |
|---|---|---|---|---|---|---|---|
| 1 | (Socialist Federal Republic of Yugoslavia) (Spain) | Željko Franulović; Manuel Orantes | 5; 7 | 4; 6 | 6; 8 |
| 2 | (Socialist Federal Republic of Yugoslavia) (Spain) | Boro Jovanović; Manuel Santana | 1; 6 | 1; 6 | 3; 6 |
| 3 | (Socialist Federal Republic of Yugoslavia) (Spain) | Željko Franulović / Boro Jovanović; Manuel Orantes / Manuel Santana | 6; 8 | 1; 6 | 5; 7 |
| 4 | (Socialist Federal Republic of Yugoslavia) (Spain) | Željko Franulović; Manuel Santana | 4; 6 | 6; 3 | 7; 9 | 2; 6 |
| 5 | (Socialist Federal Republic of Yugoslavia) (Spain) | Boro Jovanović; Manuel Orantes | 2; 6 | 4; 6 | 4; 6 |

==== Romania vs. Israel ====
Romania
5
Bucharest, Romania
22–24 May 1969
Clay

Israel
0

| | | | 1 | 2 | 3 | 4 | 5 |
|---|---|---|---|---|---|---|---|
| 1 | (Romania) (Israel) | Ilie Năstase; Josef Stabholz | 6; 2 | 6; 2 | 6; 0 |
| 2 | (Romania) (Israel) | Ion Țiriac; Eleazar Davidman | 6; 2 | 7; 5 | 6; 2 |
| 3 | (Romania) (Israel) | Ilie Năstase / Ion Țiriac; Eleazar Davidman / Ian Froman | 6; 2 | 6; 0 | 6; 4 |
| 4 | (Romania) (Israel) | Ion Țiriac; Josef Stabholz | 6; 2 | 6; 2 | 6; 0 |
| 5 | (Romania) (Israel) | Ilie Năstase; Eleazar Davidman | 6; 0 | 6; 2 | 6; 4 |

==== Soviet Union vs. Canada ====
Soviet Union
4
Moscow, Soviet Union
23–25 May 1969
Clay

Canada
1

| | | | 1 | 2 | 3 | 4 | 5 |
|---|---|---|---|---|---|---|---|---|
| 1 | (Soviet Union) (Canada) | Alex Metreveli; John Sharpe | 6; 0 | 6; 0 | 6; 4 |
| 2 | (Soviet Union) (Canada) | Toomas Leius; Mike Belkin | 9; 7 | 3; 6 | 6; 4 | 2; 6 | 7; 9 |
| 3 | (Soviet Union) (Canada) | Sergei Likhachev / Alex Metreveli; Henry Fauquier / John Sharpe | 6; 2 | 6; 3 | 6; 2 |
| 4 | (Soviet Union) (Canada) | Toomas Leius; John Sharpe | 6; 4 | 6; 4 | 6; 4 |
| 5 | (Soviet Union) (Canada) | Alex Metreveli; Mike Belkin | 2; 6 | 8; 9 | | | | retired |

==== Italy vs. Austria ====
Italy
5
Barletta, Italy
23–25 May 1969
Clay

Austria
0

| | | | 1 | 2 | 3 | 4 | 5 |
|---|---|---|---|---|---|---|---|---|
| 1 | (Italy) (Austria) | Nicola Pietrangeli; Detlef Herdy | 6; 1 | 8; 6 | 6; 3 |
| 2 | (Italy) (Austria) | Eugenio Castigliano; Ernst Blanke | 1; 6 | 6; 3 | 3; 6 | 4; 4 | | retired |
| 3 | (Italy) (Austria) | Vittorio Crotta / Pietro Marzano; Detlef Herdy / Hans Kary | 6; 2 | 6; 2 | 6; 4 |
| 4 | (Italy) (Austria) | Nicola Pietrangeli; Ernst Blanke | 3; 6 | 7; 5 | 6; 2 | 1; 6 | 8; 6 |
| 5 | (Italy) (Austria) | Eugenio Castigliano; Dieter Schultheiss | 3; 6 | 6; 1 | 6; 2 | 6; 1 |

=== Semifinals ===
==== Spain vs. Romania ====
Spain
1
Club de Tenis Valencia, Valencia, Spain
13–15 June 1969
Clay

Romania
4

| | | | 1 | 2 | 3 | 4 | 5 |
|---|---|---|---|---|---|---|---|
| 1 | (Spain) (Romania) | José Luis Arilla; Ilie Năstase | 4; 6 | 6; 8 | 2; 6 |
| 2 | (Spain) (Romania) | Manuel Orantes; Ion Țiriac | 4; 6 | 3; 6 | 6; 4 | 6; 1 | 3; 6 |
| 3 | (Spain) (Romania) | José Luis Arilla / Manuel Orantes; Ilie Năstase / Ion Țiriac | 4; 6 | 8; 6 | 7; 9 | 9; 7 | 6; 8 |
| 4 | (Spain) (Romania) | José Luis Arilla; Ion Țiriac | 2; 6 | 6; 3 | 2; 6 | 4; 6 |
| 5 | (Spain) (Romania) | Manuel Orantes; Petre Mărmureanu | 6; 1 | 6; 1 | 6; 1 |

==== Soviet Union vs. Italy ====
Soviet Union
5
Moscow, Soviet Union
13–15 June 1969

Italy
0

| | | | 1 | 2 | 3 | 4 | 5 |
|---|---|---|---|---|---|---|---|
| 1 | (Soviet Union) (Italy) | Toomas Leius; Nicola Pietrangeli | 6; 4 | 6; 4 | 6; 8 | 6; 3 |
| 2 | (Soviet Union) (Italy) | Alex Metreveli; Eugenio Castigliano | 6; 1 | 6; 2 | 6; 3 |
| 3 | (Soviet Union) (Italy) | Sergei Likhachev / Alex Metreveli; Vittorio Crotta / Pietro Marzano | 7; 5 | 6; 4 | 8; 6 |
| 4 | (Soviet Union) (Italy) | Alex Metreveli; Nicola Pietrangeli | 6; 2 | 6; 2 | 6; 2 |
| 5 | (Soviet Union) (Italy) | Toomas Leius; Eugenio Castigliano | 4; 6 | 3; 6 | 6; 4 | 7; 5 | 6; 2 |

=== Final ===
==== Romania vs. Soviet Union ====
Romania
4
Bucharest, Romania
18–20 July 1969
Clay

Soviet Union
1

| | | | 1 | 2 | 3 | 4 | 5 |
|---|---|---|---|---|---|---|---|
| 1 | (Romania) (Soviet Union) | Ion Țiriac; Toomas Leius | 6; 3 | 6; 3 | 8; 6 |
| 2 | (Romania) (Soviet Union) | Ilie Năstase; Alex Metreveli | 6; 4 | 6; 2 | 7; 5 |
| 3 | (Romania) (Soviet Union) | Ilie Năstase / Ion Țiriac; Sergei Likhachev / Alex Metreveli | 6; 8 | 6; 1 | 6; 4 | 8; 6 |
| 4 | (Romania) (Soviet Union) | Ilie Năstase; Toomas Leius | 4; 6 | 6; 3 | 6; 2 | 6; 2 |
| 5 | (Romania) (Soviet Union) | Sever Dron; Vladimir Korotkov | 1; 6 | 4; 6 | 4; 6 |
