= 2008 Shelbourne Irish Open =

- Date: 30 June – 5 July
- Edition: 3rd
- Category: ATP Challenger Series
- Draw: 32S/32Q/16D
- Prize money: EUR €64,000
- Surface: Carpet / outdoor
- Location: Dublin, Ireland
- Venue: Fitzwilliam Lawn Tennis Club

Champions

Singles
- (Australia) Robert Smeets

Doubles
- (India) Prakash Amritraj / (Pakistan) Aisam-ul-Haq Qureshi
- Shelbourne Irish Open

The 2008 Shelbourne Irish Open was a men's tennis tournament played on outdoor carpet courts. It was the 3rd and final edition of the event, and part of the 2008 ATP Challenger Series of the 2008 ATP Tour. It took place at the tennis courts at the Fitzwilliam Lawn Tennis Club in Dublin, Ireland, from 30 June through 5 July 2008.

== Points and prize money ==
=== Point distribution ===
Event	W	F	SF	QF	Round of 16	Round of 32	Q	Q2	Q1
Singles	60	42	27	14	6	0	3	0	
Doubles	60	42	27	14	0	—N/a			

=== Prize money ===
Event	W	F	SF	QF	Round of 16	Round of 32	Q2	Q1
Singles	€9,200	€5,400	€3,250	€1,850	€1,100	€660	€0	
Doubles*	€3,950	€2,350	€1,380	€850	€460	—N/a		

_{* per team}

== Singles main draw entrants ==
=== Seeds ===
Country	Player	Rank	Seed
GER	Mischa Zverev	92	1
LUX	Gilles Müller	105	2
CRO	Roko Karanušić	111	3
DEN	Kristian Pless	126	4
PAK	Aisam-ul-Haq Qureshi	158	5
AUS	Robert Smeets	167	6
RUS	Alexander Kudryavtsev	190	7
NED	Matwé Middelkoop	207	8

=== Other entrants ===
The following players received wildcards into the singles main draw:

- (Republic of Ireland) James Cluskey
- (Republic of Ireland) Eoin Heavey
- (Republic of Ireland) Tristan Farron-Mahon
- (Republic of Ireland) Colin O'Brien

The following players received entry from the qualifying draw:

- (United Kingdom) Richard Bloomfield
- (Czech Republic) Tomáš Cakl
- (Slovakia) Ivo Klec
- (Netherlands) Michel Koning

== Doubles main draw entrants ==
=== Seeds ===
Country	Player	Country	Player	Rank	Seed
AUS	Andrew Coelho	AUS	Adam Feeney	376	1
RUS	Pavel Chekhov	RUS	Alexander Kudryavtsev	428	2
GBR	Josh Goodall	GBR	Ken Skupski	511	3
GBR	Jonathan Marray	DEN	Frederik Nielsen	501	4

=== Other entrants ===
The following pairs received wildcards into the doubles main draw:

- (Republic of Ireland) Tristan Farron-Mahon / (Republic of Ireland) Barry King
- (Republic of Ireland) Daniel Glancy / (United Kingdom) Michael Hayes
- (Republic of Ireland) Eoin Heavey / (Republic of Ireland) James McGee

== Champions ==
=== Singles ===
- (Australia) Robert Smeets defeated (Denmark) Frederik Nielsen, 7–6^{(7–5)}, 6–2

=== Doubles ===
- (India) Prakash Amritraj / (Pakistan) Aisam-ul-Haq Qureshi defeated (United Kingdom) Jonathan Marray / (Denmark) Frederik Nielsen, 6–3, 7–6^{(8–6)}
