= 2008 Shelbourne Irish Open – Singles =

Singles
- 2008 Shelbourne Irish Open

Final
- Champion: (Australia) Robert Smeets
- Runner-up: (Denmark) Frederik Nielsen
- Score: 7–6^{(7–5)}, 6–2

Events
Singles	Doubles
- Shelbourne Irish Open

Rohan Bopanna was the defending champion but chose not to compete this year.

Robert Smeets won the title, defeating Frederik Nielsen in the final, 7–6^{(7–5)}, 6–2.

== Seeds ==
1. (Germany) Mischa Zverev (first round)
2. (Luxembourg) Gilles Müller (quarterfinals)
3. (Croatia) Roko Karanušić (first round)
4. (Denmark) Kristian Pless (second round)
5. (Pakistan) Aisam-ul-Haq Qureshi (second round)
6. (Australia) Robert Smeets (champion)
7. (Russia) Alexander Kudryavtsev (first round)
8. (Netherlands) Matwé Middelkoop (first round)

== Draw ==
Key

- Q = Qualifier
- WC = Wild card
- LL = Lucky loser
- Alt = Alternate
- ITF = ITF entry
- PR = Protected ranking
- SR = Special ranking
- SE = Special exempt
- JE = Junior exempt
- JR = Junior Accelerator Programme entrant
- CO = College Accelerator Programme entrant
- NG = Next Gen Accelerator Program entrant
- w/o = Walkover
- r = Retired
- d = Defaulted

=== Finals ===
Semifinals
6	(Australia) Robert Smeets	7^{7}	6
Q	(Czech Republic) Tomáš Cakl	6^{5}	1
(United Kingdom) Jonathan Marray	7^{10}	6^{4}	3
(Denmark) Frederik Nielsen	6^{8}	7^{7}	6

Final
6	(Australia) Robert Smeets	7^{7}	6
(Denmark) Frederik Nielsen	6^{5}	2

=== Top half ===
First round
1	(Germany) M Zverev	4	3
Q	(Netherlands) M Koning	6	6
WC	(Republic of Ireland) E Heavey	4	3
(India) P Amritraj	6	6
WC	(Republic of Ireland) J Cluskey	3	5
(Australia) A Feeney	6	7
(Sweden) M Ryderstedt	6^{2}	4
6	(Australia) R Smeets	7^{7}	6
3	(Croatia) R Karanušić	6	7
(France) G Lugassy	2	5
Q	(Slovakia) I Klec	6	6
Q	(United Kingdom) R Bloomfield	3	2
Q	(Czech Republic) T Cakl	7^{7}	6
(Austria) M Fischer	6^{4}	4
WC	(Republic of Ireland) C O'Brien	3	6^{3}
5	(Pakistan) A-u-H Quershi	6	7^{7}

Second round
Q	(Netherlands) M Koning	3	6	3
(India) P Amritraj	6	1	6
(Australia) A Feeney	4	7^{7}	1
6	(Australia) R Smeets	6	6^{0}	6
3	(Croatia) R Karanušić
Q	(Slovakia) I Klec	w/o
Q	(Czech Republic) T Cakl	6	3	7
5	(Pakistan) A-u-H Quershi	4	6	5

Quarterfinals
(India) P Amritraj	0	3
6	(Australia) R Smeets	6	6
Q	(Slovakia) I Klec	6^{6}	3
Q	(Czech Republic) T Cakl	7^{8}	6

Semifinals
6	(Australia) R Smeets	7^{7}	6
Q	(Czech Republic) T Cakl	6^{5}	1

=== Bottom half ===
First round
8	(Netherlands) M Middelkoop	6	1	6^{8}
(Sweden) B Rehnquist	3	6	7^{10}
(United Kingdom) A Slabinsky	6	6
(Republic of Ireland) C Niland	4	4
(United Kingdom) J Marray	3	6	6
(India) H Mankad	6	3	4
WC	(Republic of Ireland) T Farron-Mahon	6^{3}	6	6^{2}
4	(Denmark) K Pless	7^{7}	3	7^{7}
7	(Russia) A Kudryavtsev	6^{4}	4
(Denmark) F Nielsen	7^{7}	6
(United Kingdom) J Goodall	3	7^{7}	3
(Australia) A Coelho	6	6^{3}	6
(Russia) P Chekhov	6^{3}	4
(Australia) C Ebelthite	7^{7}	6
(Uruguay) M Felder	7	4	3
2	(Luxembourg) G Müller	5	6	6

Second round
(Sweden) B Rehnquist	7^{7}	6
(United Kingdom) A Slabinsky	6^{2}	4
(United Kingdom) J Marray	6	6
4	(Denmark) K Pless	1	4
(Denmark) F Nielsen	7^{7}	4	6
(Australia) A Coelho	6^{4}	6	3
(Australia) C Ebelthite	6^{9}	5
2	(Luxembourg) G Müller	7^{11}	7

Quarterfinals
(Sweden) B Rehnquist	4	3
(United Kingdom) J Marray	6	6
(Denmark) F Nielsen	7^{7}	6
2	(Luxembourg) G Müller	6^{4}	4

Semifinals
(United Kingdom) J Marray	7^{10}	6^{4}	3
(Denmark) F Nielsen	6^{8}	7^{7}	6
