= 2008 Shelbourne Irish Open – Doubles =

Doubles
- 2008 Shelbourne Irish Open

Final
- Champions: (India) Prakash Amritraj (Pakistan) Aisam-ul-Haq Qureshi
- Runners-up: (United Kingdom) Jonathan Marray (Denmark) Frederik Nielsen
- Score: 6–3, 7–6^{(8–6)}

Events
Singles	Doubles
← 2007 ·	Shelbourne Irish Open

Rohan Bopanna and Adam Feeney were the defending champions but Bopanna chose not to compete this year. Feeney instead partnered Andrew Coelho and lost in the quarterfinals to Prakash Amritraj and Aisam-ul-Haq Qureshi.

Amritraj and Qureshi went on to win the title, defeating Jonathan Marray and Frederik Nielsen in the final, 6–3, 7–6^{(8–6)}.

== Seeds ==
1. (Australia) Andrew Coelho / (Australia) Adam Feeney (quarterfinals)
2. (Russia) Pavel Chekhov / (Russia) Alexander Kudryavtsev (semifinals)
3. (United Kingdom) Josh Goodall / (United Kingdom) Ken Skupski (first round)
4. (United Kingdom) Jonathan Marray / (Denmark) Frederik Nielsen (final)

== Draw ==
=== Key ===
- Q = Qualifier
- WC = Wild card
- LL = Lucky loser
- Alt = Alternate
- SE = Special exempt
- PR = Protected ranking
- ITF = ITF entry
- JE = Junior exempt
- w/o = Walkover
- r = Retired
- d = Defaulted
- SR = Special ranking

=== Draw ===
First round
1	(Australia) A Coelho (Australia) A Feeney	6	6
(India) P Raja (United States) N Roshan	3	4
WC	(Republic of Ireland) T Farron-Mahon (Republic of Ireland) B King	3	5
(India) P Amritraj (Pakistan) A-u-H Qureshi	6	7
3	(United Kingdom) J Goodall (United Kingdom) K Skupski	5	2
(Netherlands) M Koning (Netherlands) M Middelkoop	7	6
WC	(Republic of Ireland) E Heavey (Republic of Ireland) J McGee	4	6	[11]
(United States) S La Porte (United Kingdom) A Slabinsky	6	3	[13]
(Czech Republic) T Cakl (Greece) N Karagiannis	4	3
(Republic of Ireland) J Cluskey (Republic of Ireland) C O'Brien	6	6
WC	(Republic of Ireland) D Glancy (Republic of Ireland) M Hayes	0	3
4	(United Kingdom) J Marray (Denmark) F Nielsen	6	6
(Croatia) R Karanušić (Slovakia) I Klec	5	7^{7}	[10]
(India) H Mankad (India) A Singh	7	6^{3}	[8]
(Uruguay) M Felder (United States) G Gehrke	4	3
2	(Russia) P Chekhov (Russia) A Kudryavstev	6	6

Quarterfinals
1	(Australia) A Coelho (Australia) A Feeney	3	6^{3}
(India) P Amritraj (Pakistan) A-u-H Qureshi	6	7^{7}
(Netherlands) M Koning (Netherlands) M Middelkoop	3	7^{7}	[15]
(United States) S La Porte (United Kingdom) A Slabinsky	6	6^{2}	[13]
(Republic of Ireland) J Cluskey (Republic of Ireland) C O'Brien	3	4
4	(United Kingdom) J Marray (Denmark) F Nielsen	6	6
(Croatia) R Karanušić (Slovakia) I Klec
2	(Russia) P Chekhov (Russia) A Kudryavstev	w/o

Semifinals
(India) P Amritraj (Pakistan) A-u-H Qureshi	4	7^{7}	[10]
(Netherlands) M Koning (Netherlands) M Middelkoop	6	6^{4}	[5]
4	(United Kingdom) J Marray (Denmark) F Nielsen	2	6	[10]
(Russia) P Chekhov (Russia) A Kudryavstev	6	1	[8]

Final
(India) P Amritraj (Pakistan) A-u-H Qureshi	6	7^{8}
4	(United Kingdom) J Marray (Denmark) F Nielsen	3	6^{6}
