= 1967 Davis Cup Europe Zone =

International tennis competition

The Europe Zone was one of the three regional zones of the 1967 Davis Cup.

32 teams entered the Europe Zone, competing across 2 sub-zones. The winners of each sub-zone went on to compete in the Inter-Zonal Zone against the winners of the America Zone and Eastern Zone.

Spain defeated the Soviet Union in the Zone A final, and South Africa defeated Brazil in the Zone B final, resulting in both Spain and South Africa progressing to the Inter-Zonal Zone.

== Zone A ==
=== Draw ===
First Round; 28 April–8 May
Sofia, Bulgaria (clay)
Bulgaria	5
Portugal	0
Bournemouth, England (clay)
Canada	1
Great Britain	4
Bucharest, Romania (clay)
Romania	4
Belgium	1
San Sebastián, Spain (clay)
Egypt	0
Spain	5
Geneva, Switzerland
Switzerland	2
Greece	3
Prague, Czechoslovakia (clay)
Chile	3
Czechoslovakia	2
Helsinki, Finland (clay)
Finland	1
Denmark	4
Düsseldorf, West Germany
Soviet Union	3
West Germany	2

Quarterfinals; 19–23 May
Sofia, Bulgaria (clay)
Bulgaria	0
Great Britain	5
Bucharest, Romania (clay)
Romania	2
Spain	3
Athens, Greece
Greece	2
Chile	3
Copenhagen, Denmark (clay)
Denmark	2
Soviet Union	3

Semifinals; 7–10 June
Eastbourne, England (grass)
Great Britain	2
Spain	3
Moscow, Soviet Union
Chile	0
Soviet Union	3

Final; 14–16 July
Barcelona, Spain (clay)
Spain	4
Soviet Union	1

=== First round ===
==== Bulgaria vs. Portugal ====
Bulgaria
5
Sofia, Bulgaria
5–7 May 1967
Clay

Portugal
0

			1	2	3	4	5
1	(Bulgaria) (Portugal)	Kiril Yashmakov; Alfredo Vaz Pinto	6; 4	5; 7	6; 2	6; 4
2	(Bulgaria) (Portugal)	Rangel Rangelov; João Lagos	6; 1	6; 2	6; 4
3	(Bulgaria) (Portugal)	Bozhidar Pampoulov / Rangel Rangelov; João Roquette / Alfredo Vaz Pinto	6; 4	6; 2	6; 2
4	(Bulgaria) (Portugal)	Rangel Rangelov; Alfredo Vaz Pinto	6; 1	6; 1	6; 2
5	(Bulgaria) (Portugal)	Kiril Yashmakov; João Lagos	6; 1	6; 2	5; 7	6; 1

==== Great Britain vs. Canada ====
Great Britain
4
West Hants Lawn Tennis Club, Bournemouth, England
4–7 May 1967
Clay

Canada
1

			1	2	3	4	5
1	(United Kingdom) (Canada)	Mike Sangster; Mike Belkin	2; 6	3; 6	6; 3	1; 6
2	(United Kingdom) (Canada)	Roger Taylor; Robert Bédard	6; 4	3; 6	6; 3	1; 6	7; 5
3	(United Kingdom) (Canada)	Roger Taylor / Bobby Wilson; Keith Carpenter / Mike Belkin	3; 6	4; 6	8; 6	7; 5	12; 10
4	(United Kingdom) (Canada)	Roger Taylor; Mike Belkin	2; 6	2; 6	6; 4	7; 5	6; 3
5	(United Kingdom) (Canada)	Mike Sangster; Robert Bédard	6; 4	6; 4	6; 1

==== Romania vs. Belgium ====
Romania
4
Bucharest, Romania
28–30 April 1967
Clay

Belgium
1

			1	2	3	4	5
1	(Romania) (Belgium)	Ion Țiriac; Eric Drossart	4; 6	2; 6	7; 9
2	(Romania) (Belgium)	Ilie Năstase; Patrick Hombergen	6; 3	5; 7	6; 1	6; 0
3	(Romania) (Belgium)	Ilie Năstase / Ion Țiriac; Eric Drossart / Claude De Gronckel	6; 4	6; 0	6; 4
4	(Romania) (Belgium)	Ilie Năstase; Eric Drossart	6; 2	5; 7	10; 8	6; 2
5	(Romania) (Belgium)	Ion Țiriac; Patrick Hombergen	8; 6	7; 5	6; 8	3; 1		retired

==== Spain vs. Egypt ====
Spain
5
Real Club de Tenis, San Sebastián, Spain
5–7 May 1967
Clay

Egypt
0

			1	2	3	4	5
1	(Spain) (Egypt)	José Luis Arilla; Shaher Mourad	7; 5	6; 4	6; 3
2	(Spain) (Egypt)	Manuel Santana; Moataz El Sonbol	6; 0	7; 5	6; 4
3	(Spain) (Egypt)	José Luis Arilla / Manuel Santana; Fathi Mohammed-Ali / Shaher Mourad	6; 1	6; 2	6; 3
4	(Spain) (Egypt)	Manuel Santana; Shaher Mourad	7; 5	6; 2	6; 3
5	(Spain) (Egypt)	Manuel Orantes; Moataz El Sonbol	6; 1	6; 2	6; 2

==== Switzerland vs. Greece ====
Switzerland
2
Geneva, Switzerland
4–8 May 1967

Greece
3

			1	2	3	4	5
1	(Switzerland) (Greece)	Matthias Werren; Periclis Gavrilidis	7; 5	6; 2	6; 3
2	(Switzerland) (Greece)	Dimitri Sturdza; Nicholas Kalogeropoulos	6; 3	3; 6	9; 7	2; 6	3; 6
3	(Switzerland) (Greece)	Ernst Schori / Dimitri Sturdza; Periclis Gavrilidis / Nicholas Kalogeropoulos	6; 3	7; 9	2; 6	5; 7
4	(Switzerland) (Greece)	Matthias Werren; Nicholas Kalogeropoulos	2; 6	3; 6	3; 6
5	(Switzerland) (Greece)	Dimitri Sturdza; Periclis Gavrilidis	6; 2	6; 2	6; 2

==== Czechoslovakia vs. Chile ====
Czechoslovakia
2
Prague, Czechoslovakia
5–7 May 1967
Clay

Chile
3

			1	2	3	4	5
1	(Czechoslovakia) (Chile)	Milan Holeček; Jaime Pinto Bravo	3; 6	2; 6	1; 6
2	(Czechoslovakia) (Chile)	Jan Kodeš; Patricio Rodríguez	6; 3	1; 6	3; 6	6; 4	0; 6
3	(Czechoslovakia) (Chile)	Milan Holeček / Jan Kodeš; Patricio Cornejo / Jaime Pinto Bravo	6; 1	6; 4	6; 3
4	(Czechoslovakia) (Chile)	Jan Kodeš; Jaime Pinto Bravo	6; 2	6; 3	6; 3
5	(Czechoslovakia) (Chile)	Milan Holeček; Patricio Rodríguez	6; 3	3; 6	6; 1	3; 6	5; 7

==== Finland vs. Denmark ====
Finland
1
Helsinki, Finland
5–7 May 1967
Clay

Denmark
4

			1	2	3	4	5
1	(Finland) (Denmark)	Pekka Säilä; Torben Ulrich	2; 6	3; 6	3; 6
2	(Finland) (Denmark)	Rauno Suominen; Jørgen Ulrich	6; 1	1; 6	7; 5	1; 6	5; 7
3	(Finland) (Denmark)	Pekka Säilä / Rauno Suominen; Jørgen Ulrich / Torben Ulrich	6; 2	3; 6	1; 6	4; 6
4	(Finland) (Denmark)	Pekka Säilä; Jørgen Ulrich	2; 6	6; 4	6; 4	4; 6	6; 4
5	(Finland) (Denmark)	Rauno Suominen; Torben Ulrich	1; 6	4; 6	6; 4	1; 6

==== West Germany vs. Soviet Union ====
West Germany
2
Düsseldorf, West Germany
4–7 May 1967

Soviet Union
3

			1	2	3	4	5
1	(West Germany) (Soviet Union)	Ingo Buding; Alex Metreveli	5; 7	3; 6	6; 1	7; 9
2	(West Germany) (Soviet Union)	Wilhelm Bungert; Toomas Leius	6; 3	6; 2	7; 5
3	(West Germany) (Soviet Union)	Ingo Buding / Wilhelm Bungert; Sergei Likhachev / Alex Metreveli	3; 6	4; 6	11; 9	7; 9
4	(West Germany) (Soviet Union)	Ingo Buding; Toomas Leius	6; 4	4; 6	8; 6	6; 2
5	(West Germany) (Soviet Union)	Wilhelm Bungert; Alex Metreveli	2; 6	6; 4	6; 4	2; 6	5; 7

=== Quarterfinals ===
==== Bulgaria vs. Great Britain ====
Bulgaria
0
Sofia, Bulgaria
20–23 May 1967
Clay

Great Britain
5

			1	2	3	4	5
1	(Bulgaria) (United Kingdom)	Kiril Yashmakov; Roger Taylor	4; 6	2; 6	0; 6
2	(Bulgaria) (United Kingdom)	Rangel Rangelov; Mike Sangster	4; 6	2; 6	2; 6
3	(Bulgaria) (United Kingdom)	Bozhidar Pampoulov / Stojan Velev; Mark Cox / Bobby Wilson	0; 6	0; 6	0; 6
4	(Bulgaria) (United Kingdom)	Kiril Yashmakov; Mike Sangster	4; 6	2; 6	3; 6
5	(Bulgaria) (United Kingdom)	Rangel Rangelov; Roger Taylor	2; 6	1; 6	0; 6

==== Romania vs. Spain ====
Romania
2
Club Sportiv Progresul, Bucharest, Romania
19–22 May 1967
Clay

Spain
3

			1	2	3	4	5
1	(Romania) (Spain)	Ion Țiriac; Juan Gisbert	6; 1	6; 2	5; 7	0; 6	6; 2
2	(Romania) (Spain)	Ilie Năstase; Manuel Santana	6; 0	3; 6	3; 6	3; 6
3	(Romania) (Spain)	Ilie Năstase / Ion Țiriac; José Luis Arilla / Manuel Santana	7; 5	7; 5	6; 4
4	(Romania) (Spain)	Ilie Năstase; Juan Gisbert	3; 6	6; 4	7; 9	4; 6
5	(Romania) (Spain)	Ion Țiriac; Manuel Santana	2; 6	6; 8	5; 7

==== Greece vs. Chile ====
Greece
2
Athens, Greece
19–23 May 1967

Chile
3

			1	2	3	4	5
1	(Greece) (Chile)	Nicholas Kalogeropoulos; Patricio Rodríguez	4; 6	1; 6	1; 6
2	(Greece) (Chile)	Periclis Gavrilidis; Jaime Pinto Bravo	1; 6	6; 8	3; 6
3	(Greece) (Chile)	Periclis Gavrilidis / Nicholas Kalogeropoulos; Ernesto Aguirre / Jaime Pinto Bravo	7; 9	3; 6	6; 4	6; 2	8; 6
4	(Greece) (Chile)	Nicholas Kalogeropoulos; Jaime Pinto Bravo	7; 5	8; 6	2; 6	2; 6	6; 2
5	(Greece) (Chile)	Periclis Gavrilidis; Patricio Rodríguez	6; 3	6; 2	1; 6	1; 6	1; 6

==== Denmark vs. Soviet Union ====
Denmark
2
Copenhagen, Denmark
19–22 May 1967
Clay

Soviet Union
3

			1	2	3	4	5
1	(Denmark) (Soviet Union)	Torben Ulrich; Toomas Leius	2; 6	1; 6	6; 3	3; 6
2	(Denmark) (Soviet Union)	Jan Leschly; Alex Metreveli	7; 5	6; 8	6; 2	8; 10	6; 3
3	(Denmark) (Soviet Union)	Jan Leschly / Jørgen Ulrich; Sergei Likhachev / Alex Metreveli	6; 4	3; 6	3; 6	1; 6
4	(Denmark) (Soviet Union)	Jan Leschly; Toomas Leius	6; 3	7; 5	6; 3
5	(Denmark) (Soviet Union)	Torben Ulrich; Alex Metreveli	3; 6	1; 6	2; 6

=== Semifinals ===
==== Great Britain vs. Spain ====
Great Britain
2
Devonshire Park Lawn Tennis Club, Eastbourne, England
8–10 June 1967
Grass

Spain
3

			1	2	3	4	5
1	(United Kingdom) (Spain)	Roger Taylor; José Luis Arilla	3; 6	6; 3	6; 4	6; 2
2	(United Kingdom) (Spain)	Mike Sangster; Manuel Santana	10; 8	3; 6	7; 5	7; 9	0; 6
3	(United Kingdom) (Spain)	Mike Sangster / Bobby Wilson; José Luis Arilla / Manuel Santana	5; 7	10; 12	4; 6
4	(United Kingdom) (Spain)	Roger Taylor; Manuel Santana	4; 6	3; 6	5; 7
5	(United Kingdom) (Spain)	Mike Sangster; José Luis Arilla	6; 4	9; 11	6; 4	6; 3

==== Soviet Union vs. Chile ====
Soviet Union
3
Moscow, Soviet Union
7–9 June 1967

Chile
0

			1	2	3	4	5
1	(Soviet Union) (Chile)	Alex Metreveli; Jaime Pinto Bravo	6; 3	6; 2	5; 7	6; 1
2	(Soviet Union) (Chile)	Toomas Leius; Patricio Rodríguez	6; 4	6; 1	6; 8	6; 0
3	(Soviet Union) (Chile)	Sergei Likhachev / Alex Metreveli; Patricio Cornejo / Jaime Pinto Bravo	7; 5	6; 1	6; 2
4	(Soviet Union) (Chile)	Alex Metreveli; Patricio Rodríguez						not played
5	(Soviet Union) (Chile)	Toomas Leius; Jaime Pinto Bravo						not played

=== Final ===
==== Spain vs. Soviet Union ====
Spain
4
Real Club de Tenis, Barcelona, Spain
14–16 July 1967
Clay

Soviet Union
1

			1	2	3	4	5
1	(Spain) (Soviet Union)	Manuel Santana; Toomas Leius	6; 3	6; 4	6; 1
2	(Spain) (Soviet Union)	Juan Gisbert; Alex Metreveli	3; 6	2; 6	6; 3	7; 5	6; 2
3	(Spain) (Soviet Union)	José Luis Arilla / Manuel Santana; Sergei Likhachev / Alex Metreveli	3; 6	6; 3	4; 6	4; 6
4	(Spain) (Soviet Union)	Manuel Santana; Alex Metreveli	6; 0	6; 3	6; 3
5	(Spain) (Soviet Union)	Juan Gisbert; Toomas Leius	2; 6	6; 4	6; 3	6; 0

== Zone B ==
=== Draw ===
First Round; 28 April–7 May
Paris, France (clay)
France	5
Norway	0
Budapest, Hungary (clay)
Hungary	4
Sweden	1
Monte Carlo, Monaco
Monaco	5
Turkey	0
Scheveningen, Netherlands (clay)
Netherlands	2
South Africa	3
Verona, Italy (clay)
Italy	5
Austria	0
Mondorf-les-Bains, Luxembourg
Luxembourg	3
Ireland	2
Warsaw, Poland
Poland	5
Israel	0
Zagreb, Yugoslavia
Yugoslavia	2
Brazil	3

Quarterfinals; 19–21 May
Paris, France (clay)
France	5
Hungary	0
Monte Carlo, Monaco
Monaco	0
South Africa	5
Piacenza, Italy (clay)
Italy	5
Luxembourg	0
Warsaw, Poland
Poland	0
Brazil	5

Semifinals; 8–11 June
Paris, France (clay)
France	0
South Africa	5
Naples, Italy (clay)
Italy	1
Brazil	3

Final; 20–22 July
Durban, South Africa
South Africa	5
Brazil	0

=== First round ===
==== France vs. Norway ====
France
5
Stade Roland Garros, Paris, France
4–6 May 1967
Clay

Norway
0

			1	2	3	4	5
1	(France) (Norway)	Georges Goven; Edvard Raastad	6; 0	6; 2	6; 1
2	(France) (Norway)	François Jauffret; Nils Elvik	6; 3	6; 4	6; 2
3	(France) (Norway)	Patrice Beust / Daniel Contet; Nils Elvik / Erik Melander	6; 2	6; 4	6; 2
4	(France) (Norway)	François Jauffret; Edvard Raastad	6; 0	6; 4	6; 0
5	(France) (Norway)	Georges Goven; Nils Elvik	6; 0	6; 3	6; 0

==== Hungary vs. Sweden ====
Hungary
4
Margaret Island, Budapest, Hungary
5–7 May 1967
Clay

Sweden
1

			1	2	3	4	5
1	(Hungary) (Sweden)	István Gulyás; Ove Bengtson	6; 2	3; 6	7; 5	6; 1
2	(Hungary) (Sweden)	András Szikszay; Jan-Erik Lundqvist	4; 6	2; 6	6; 4	2; 6
3	(Hungary) (Sweden)	István Gulyás / András Szikszay; Ove Bengtson / Jan-Erik Lundqvist	6; 3	4; 6	6; 3	6; 3
4	(Hungary) (Sweden)	István Gulyás; Jan-Erik Lundqvist	8; 6	7; 5	6; 1
5	(Hungary) (Sweden)	András Szikszay; Ove Bengtson	6; 2	6; 4	6; 1

==== Monaco vs. Turkey ====
Monaco
5
Monte Carlo, Monaco
28–30 April 1967

Turkey
0

			1	2	3	4	5
1	(Monaco) (Turkey)	Patrick Landau; Tahsin Gürsoy	6; 0	6; 1	6; 5
2	(Monaco) (Turkey)	Adrien Viviani; Ziya Kipkizilorenli	6; 1					retired
3	(Monaco) (Turkey)	Patrick Landau / Francis Truchi; Beyazıt Anbar / Tahsin Gürsoy	6; 4	6; 4	6; 0
4	(Monaco) (Turkey)	André Vatrican; Beyazıt Anbar	7; 5	6; 4	7; 5
5	(Monaco) (Turkey)	Adrien Viviani; Tahsin Gürsoy	6; 4	1; 6	3; 6	6; 4	6; 4

==== Netherlands vs. South Africa ====
Netherlands
2
Scheveningen, Netherlands
4–6 May 1967
Clay

South Africa
3

			1	2	3	4	5
1	(Netherlands) (South Africa)	Tom Okker; Bob Hewitt	6; 4	1; 6	0; 6	6; 2	2; 6
2	(Netherlands) (South Africa)	Jan Hajer; Cliff Drysdale	7; 5	10; 8	6; 3
3	(Netherlands) (South Africa)	Jan Hajer / Tom Okker; Bob Hewitt / Frew McMillan	3; 6	4; 6	1; 6
4	(Netherlands) (South Africa)	Jan Hajer; Bob Hewitt	1; 6	6; 4	6; 8	1; 6
5	(Netherlands) (South Africa)	Tom Okker; Cliff Drysdale	6; 2	6; 2	0; 6	7; 5

==== Italy vs. Austria ====
Italy
5
Verona, Italy
4–6 May 1967
Clay

Austria
0

			1	2	3	4	5
1	(Italy) (Austria)	Nicola Pietrangeli; Peter Pokorny	6; 0	6; 3	6; 1
2	(Italy) (Austria)	Giordano Maioli; Dieter Schultheiss	6; 0	6; 1	6; 2
3	(Italy) (Austria)	Vittorio Crotta / Giordano Maioli; Herbert Holzer / Peter Pokorny	7; 5	7; 5	7; 5
4	(Italy) (Austria)	Giordano Maioli; Peter Pokorny	6; 3	6; 0	6; 1
5	(Italy) (Austria)	Nicola Pietrangeli; Dieter Schultheiss	8; 6	4; 6	6; 1	7; 5

==== Luxembourg vs. Ireland ====
Luxembourg
3
Mondorf-les-Bains, Luxembourg
29 April–2 May 1967

Ireland
2

			1	2	3	4	5
1	(Luxembourg) (Republic of Ireland)	Frank Baden; Peter Jackson	6; 3	7; 5	6; 4
2	(Luxembourg) (Republic of Ireland)	Thierry Brasseur; Michael Hickey	6; 8	1; 6	7; 5	2; 6
3	(Luxembourg) (Republic of Ireland)	Frank Baden / Thierry Brasseur; Michael Hickey / Peter Jackson	6; 3	1; 6	1; 6	2; 6
4	(Luxembourg) (Republic of Ireland)	Frank Baden; Michael Hickey	10; 8	6; 2	6; 1
5	(Luxembourg) (Republic of Ireland)	Thierry Brasseur; Peter Jackson	6; 3	11; 9	5; 7	7; 5

==== Poland vs. Israel ====
Poland
5
Warsaw, Poland
5–7 May 1967

Israel
0

			1	2	3	4	5
1	(Poland) (Israel)	Mieczysław Rybarczyk; Josef Stabholz	6; 1	6; 3	6; 2
2	(Poland) (Israel)	Wiesław Gąsiorek; Eleazar Davidman	6; 3	6; 2	6; 4
3	(Poland) (Israel)	Bronisław Lewandowski / Tadeusz Nowicki; Eleazar Davidman / Josef Stabholz	6; 1	6; 1	6; 4
4	(Poland) (Israel)	Bronisław Lewandowski; Josef Stabholz	6; 3	6; 4	6; 3
5	(Poland) (Israel)	Mieczysław Rybarczyk; Eleazar Davidman	6; 4	6; 3	6; 1

==== Yugoslavia vs. Brazil ====
Yugoslavia
2
Zagreb, Yugoslavia
5–7 May 1967

Brazil
3

			1	2	3	4	5
1	(Socialist Federal Republic of Yugoslavia) (Brazil)	Željko Franulović; José Edison Mandarino	3; 6	2; 6	4; 6
2	(Socialist Federal Republic of Yugoslavia) (Brazil)	Nikola Pilić; Thomaz Koch	6; 2	6; 4	3; 6	6; 1
3	(Socialist Federal Republic of Yugoslavia) (Brazil)	Boro Jovanović / Nikola Pilić; Thomaz Koch / José Edison Mandarino	7; 5	3; 6	7; 9	5; 7
4	(Socialist Federal Republic of Yugoslavia) (Brazil)	Nikola Pilić; José Edison Mandarino	6; 2	5; 7	4; 6	4; 6
5	(Socialist Federal Republic of Yugoslavia) (Brazil)	Željko Franulović; Thomaz Koch	6; 2	8; 10	6; 2	6; 4

=== Quarterfinals ===
==== France vs. Hungary ====
France
5
Stade Roland Garros, Paris, France
19–21 May 1967
Clay

Hungary
0

			1	2	3	4	5
1	(France) (Hungary)	François Jauffret; István Gulyás	6; 4	6; 8	6; 2	6; 1
2	(France) (Hungary)	Pierre Darmon; András Szikszay	6; 2	6; 4	6; 3
3	(France) (Hungary)	Patrice Beust / Daniel Contet; István Gulyás / András Szikszay	6; 2	6; 3	6; 4
4	(France) (Hungary)	François Jauffret; Péter Szőke	1; 6	4; 6	7; 5	6; 0	6; 0
5	(France) (Hungary)	Pierre Darmon; István Gulyás	6; 2	6; 2	6; 2

==== Monaco vs. South Africa ====
Monaco
0
Monte Carlo, Monaco
19–21 May 1967

South Africa
5

			1	2	3	4	5
1	(Monaco) (South Africa)	Adrien Viviani; Bob Hewitt	0; 6	0; 6	0; 6
2	(Monaco) (South Africa)	Patrick Landau; Cliff Drysdale	1; 6	4; 6	5; 7
3	(Monaco) (South Africa)	Patrick Landau / Francis Truchi; Bob Hewitt / Frew McMillan	1; 6	1; 6	2; 6
4	(Monaco) (South Africa)	Adrien Viviani; Bob Maud	1; 6	2; 6	4; 6
5	(Monaco) (South Africa)	Patrick Landau; Ray Moore	6; 3	2; 6	3; 6	4; 6

==== Italy vs. Luxembourg ====
Italy
5
Piacenza, Italy
19–21 May 1967
Clay

Luxembourg
0

			1	2	3	4	5
1	(Italy) (Luxembourg)	Nicola Pietrangeli; Frank Baden	6; 1	6; 3	6; 3
2	(Italy) (Luxembourg)	Giordano Maioli; Thierry Brasseur	6; 1	6; 0	6; 2
3	(Italy) (Luxembourg)	Vittorio Crotta / Giordano Maioli; Frank Baden / Thierry Brasseur	6; 2	6; 3	6; 3
4	(Italy) (Luxembourg)	Nicola Pietrangeli; Thierry Brasseur	6; 2	6; 2	6; 0
5	(Italy) (Luxembourg)	Giordano Maioli; Frank Baden	6; 2	6; 1	6; 4

==== Poland vs. Brazil ====
Poland
0
Warsaw, Poland
19–21 May 1967

Brazil
5

			1	2	3	4	5
1	(Poland) (Brazil)	Tadeusz Nowicki; José Edison Mandarino	1; 6	0; 6	4; 6
2	(Poland) (Brazil)	Wiesław Gąsiorek; Thomaz Koch	2; 6	2; 6	1; 6
3	(Poland) (Brazil)	Wiesław Gąsiorek / Tadeusz Nowicki; Thomaz Koch / José Edison Mandarino	6; 8	1; 6	4; 6
4	(Poland) (Brazil)	Tadeusz Nowicki; Thomaz Koch	5; 7	2; 6	4; 6
5	(Poland) (Brazil)	Wiesław Gąsiorek; José Edison Mandarino	4; 6	2; 6	4; 6

=== Semifinals ===
==== France vs. South Africa ====
France
0
Stade Roland Garros, Paris, France
9–11 June 1967
Clay

South Africa
5

			1	2	3	4	5
1	(France) (South Africa)	François Jauffret; Bob Hewitt	1; 6	1; 6	6; 4	7; 9
2	(France) (South Africa)	Pierre Darmon; Cliff Drysdale	1; 6	2; 6	1; 6
3	(France) (South Africa)	Patrice Beust / Daniel Contet; Bob Hewitt / Frew McMillan	11; 9	1; 6	3; 6	1; 6
4	(France) (South Africa)	François Jauffret; Cliff Drysdale	1; 6	2; 6	5; 7
5	(France) (South Africa)	Daniel Contet; Bob Maud	7; 9	2; 6	3; 6

==== Italy vs. Brazil ====
Italy
1
Naples, Italy
8–10 June 1967
Clay

Brazil
3

			1	2	3	4	5
1	(Italy) (Brazil)	Nicola Pietrangeli; José Edison Mandarino	6; 2	7; 9	4; 6	3; 6
2	(Italy) (Brazil)	Giordano Maioli; Thomaz Koch	0; 6	3; 6	5; 7
3	(Italy) (Brazil)	Vittorio Crotta / Giordano Maioli; Thomaz Koch / José Edison Mandarino	3; 6	4; 6	2; 6
4	(Italy) (Brazil)	Nicola Pietrangeli; Thomaz Koch	5; 7	2; 6	6; 4	6; 0	6; 0
5	(Italy) (Brazil)	Giordano Maioli; José Edison Mandarino	1; 6	1; 6	6; 4	6; 4	5; 5	not completed

=== Final ===
==== South Africa vs. Brazil ====
South Africa
5
Durban, South Africa
20–22 July 1967

Brazil
0

			1	2	3	4	5
1	(South Africa) (Brazil)	Bob Hewitt; Thomaz Koch	6; 4	9; 11	11; 9	6; 2
2	(South Africa) (Brazil)	Cliff Drysdale; José Edison Mandarino	6; 2	8; 6	6; 2
3	(South Africa) (Brazil)	Bob Hewitt / Frew McMillan; Thomaz Koch / José Edison Mandarino	1; 6	4; 6	6; 3	6; 4	6; 3
4	(South Africa) (Brazil)	Bob Hewitt; José Edison Mandarino	1; 6	3; 6	6; 4	6; 2	6; 0
5	(South Africa) (Brazil)	Cliff Drysdale; Thomaz Koch	6; 3	8; 6	6; 4
