= 1969 Davis Cup Americas Zone =

International tennis competition

The Americas Zone was one of the three regional zones of the 1969 Davis Cup.

9 teams entered the Americas Zone: 3 teams competed in the North & Central America Zone, while 6 teams competed in the South America Zone. The winner of each sub-zone would play against each other to determine who moved to the Inter-Zonal Zone to compete against the winners of the Eastern Zone and Europe Zone.

Mexico defeated Australia in the North & Central America Zone final, and Brazil defeated Chile in the South America Zone final. In the Americas Inter-Zonal Final, Brazil defeated Mexico and progressed to the Inter-Zonal Zone.

== North & Central America Zone ==
=== Draw ===
Semifinals; 3–5 May
Bridgetown, Barbados
Mexico	4
Caribbean/West Indies	1
bye
Australia

Final; 23–25 May
Mexico City, Mexico (clay)
Mexico	3
Australia	2

=== Semifinals ===
==== Caribbean/West Indies vs. Mexico ====
Caribbean/West Indies
1
Bridgetown, Barbados
3–5 May 1969

Mexico
4

			1	2	3	4	5
1	(Cricket West Indies) (Mexico)	Richard Russell; Rafael Osuna	1; 6	3; 6	2; 6
2	(Cricket West Indies) (Mexico)	David Tate; Vicente Zarazúa	6; 3	9; 7	6; 4
3	(Cricket West Indies) (Mexico)	Alan Price / Richard Russell; Rafael Osuna / Vicente Zarazúa	4; 6	7; 9	6; 8
4	(Cricket West Indies) (Mexico)	David Tate; Rafael Osuna	3; 6	2; 6	1; 6
5	(Cricket West Indies) (Mexico)	Richard Russell; Vicente Zarazúa	4; 6	6; 3	3; 6	6; 2	4; 6

=== Final ===
==== Mexico vs. Australia ====
Mexico
3
Centro Deportivo Chapultepec, Mexico City, Mexico
23–25 May 1969
Clay

Australia
2

			1	2	3	4	5
1	(Mexico) (Australia)	Rafael Osuna; Ray Ruffels	9; 7	3; 6	7; 5	6; 3
2	(Mexico) (Australia)	Joaquín Loyo Mayo; Bill Bowrey	6; 4	3; 6	2; 6	5; 7
3	(Mexico) (Australia)	Rafael Osuna / Vicente Zarazúa; John Alexander / Phil Dent	18; 16	12; 10	6; 4
4	(Mexico) (Australia)	Joaquín Loyo Mayo; Ray Ruffels	3; 6	6; 4	4; 6	8; 10
5	(Mexico) (Australia)	Rafael Osuna; Bill Bowrey	6; 2	3; 6	8; 6	6; 3

== South America Zone ==
=== Draw ===
Quarterfinals; 2–5 May
Brazil
bye
Caracas, Venezuela
Venezuela	2
Colombia	3
Santiago, Chile
Chile	3
Argentina	2
bye
Ecuador

Semifinals; 16–18 May
Bogotá, Colombia
Brazil	3
Colombia	2
Santiago, Chile (clay)
Chile	4
Ecuador	1

Final; 14–16 June
Santiago, Chile
Brazil	3
Chile	2

=== Quarterfinals ===
==== Venezuela vs. Colombia ====
Venezuela
2
Caracas, Venezuela
3–5 May 1969

Colombia
3

			1	2	3	4	5
1	(Venezuela) (Colombia)	Jorge Andrew; William Álvarez	2; 6	6; 4	8; 6	7; 5
2	(Venezuela) (Colombia)	Humphrey Hose; Jairo Velasco	6; 2	8; 6	8; 6
3	(Venezuela) (Colombia)	Jorge Andrew / Humphrey Hose; William Álvarez / Jairo Velasco	1; 6	6; 4	6; 4	3; 6	4; 6
4	(Venezuela) (Colombia)	Humphrey Hose; William Álvarez	6; 0	6; 2	2; 6	4; 6	4; 6
5	(Venezuela) (Colombia)	Jorge Andrew; Jairo Velasco	2; 6	3; 6	2; 6

==== Chile vs. Argentina ====
Chile
3
Santiago, Chile
2–4 May 1969

Argentina
2

			1	2	3	4	5
1	(Chile) (Argentina)	Jaime Fillol; Eduardo Soriano	6; 2	6; 3	6; 2
2	(Chile) (Argentina)	Patricio Cornejo; Julián Ganzábal	5; 7	4; 6	6; 1	6; 3	6; 3
3	(Chile) (Argentina)	Patricio Cornejo / Jaime Fillol; Julián Ganzábal / Eduardo Soriano	6; 4	4; 6	7; 5	2; 6	7; 9
4	(Chile) (Argentina)	Jaime Fillol; Julián Ganzábal	3; 6	7; 5	1; 6	1; 6
5	(Chile) (Argentina)	Patricio Cornejo; Eduardo Soriano	6; 1	6; 2	6; 3

=== Semifinals ===
==== Colombia vs. Brazil ====
Colombia
2
Bogotá, Colombia
16–18 May 1969

Brazil
3

			1	2	3	4	5
1	(Colombia) (Brazil)	Jairo Velasco; Thomaz Koch	3; 6	6; 1	6; 4	6; 4
2	(Colombia) (Brazil)	William Álvarez; José Edison Mandarino	7; 9	2; 6	5; 7
3	(Colombia) (Brazil)	William Álvarez / Jairo Velasco; Thomaz Koch / José Edison Mandarino	5; 7	1; 6	2; 6
4	(Colombia) (Brazil)	William Álvarez; Thomaz Koch	2; 6	5; 7	2; 6
5	(Colombia) (Brazil)	Jairo Velasco; José Edison Mandarino	6; 2	6; 1	6; 3

==== Chile vs. Ecuador ====
Chile
4
Santiago, Chile
16–18 May 1969
Clay

Ecuador
1

			1	2	3	4	5
1	(Chile) (Ecuador)	Patricio Cornejo; Pancho Guzmán	6; 3	1; 6	8; 6	6; 4
2	(Chile) (Ecuador)	Jaime Fillol; Miguel Olvera	7; 5	6; 0	0; 6	6; 2
3	(Chile) (Ecuador)	Patricio Cornejo / Jaime Pinto Bravo; Pancho Guzmán / Miguel Olvera	10; 8	6; 1	6; 4
4	(Chile) (Ecuador)	Jaime Fillol; Pancho Guzmán	6; 3	0; 6	6; 4	3; 6	4; 6
5	(Chile) (Ecuador)	Patricio Cornejo; Miguel Olvera	6; 3	6; 3	6; 3

=== Final ===
==== Chile vs. Brazil ====
Chile
2
Santiago, Chile
14–16 June 1969

Brazil
3

			1	2	3	4	5
1	(Chile) (Brazil)	Jaime Fillol; José Edison Mandarino	3; 6	3; 6	6; 4	8; 6	10; 8
2	(Chile) (Brazil)	Patricio Cornejo; Thomaz Koch	5; 7	3; 6	2; 6
3	(Chile) (Brazil)	Patricio Cornejo / Jaime Fillol; Thomaz Koch / José Edison Mandarino	2; 6	2; 6	2; 6
4	(Chile) (Brazil)	Patricio Cornejo; José Edison Mandarino	6; 4	3; 6	2; 6	6; 0	6; 4
5	(Chile) (Brazil)	Jaime Fillol; Thomaz Koch	4; 6	6; 2	6; 4	2; 6	5; 7

== Americas Inter-Zonal Final ==
=== Brazil vs. Mexico ===
Brazil
4
Esporte Clube Pinheiros, São Paulo, Brazil
19–21 June 1969
Clay

Mexico
1

			1	2	3	4	5
1	(Brazil) (Mexico)	José Edison Mandarino; Marcello Lara	4; 6	6; 2	6; 4	5; 7	6; 3
2	(Brazil) (Mexico)	Thomaz Koch; Joaquín Loyo Mayo	7; 5	6; 1	6; 3
3	(Brazil) (Mexico)	Thomaz Koch / José Edison Mandarino; Luis-Augusto García / Joaquín Loyo Mayo	19; 17	6; 3	6; 4
4	(Brazil) (Mexico)	José Edison Mandarino; Joaquín Loyo Mayo	6; 2	7; 5	5; 7	3; 6	5; 7
5	(Brazil) (Mexico)	Thomaz Koch; Luis-Augusto García	4; 6	6; 1	6; 2	6; 4
