= 1969 Davis Cup Eastern Zone =

International tennis competition

The Eastern Zone was one of the three regional zones of the 1969 Davis Cup.

8 teams entered the Eastern Zone, competing across 2 sub-zones. The winner of each sub-zones would play against each other to determine who would compete in the Inter-Zonal Zone against the winners of the Americas Zone and Europe Zone.

Japan received a walkover in the Zone A final after South Vietnam withdrew, while India defeated Ceylon in the Zone B final. In the Inter-Zonal final India defeated Japan and progressed to the Inter-Zonal Zone.

== Zone A ==
=== Draw ===
Quarterfinals; 28–30 March
Jakarta, Indonesia
Indonesia	0
Philippines	3
Japan
bye
bye
South Korea
bye
South Vietnam

Semifinals; 4–20 April
Tokyo, Japan
Philippines	0
Japan	5
Seoul, South Korea
South Korea	2
South Vietnam	3

Final
Japan	w/o
South Vietnam

=== Quarterfinals ===
==== Indonesia vs. Philippines ====
Indonesia
0
Jakarta, Indonesia
28–30 March 1969

Philippines
3

			1	2	3	4	5
1	(Indonesia) (Philippines)	Atet Wijono; Eduardo Cruz	2; 6	7; 5	6; 4	2; 6	2; 6
2	(Indonesia) (Philippines)	Sutarjo Sugiarto; Raymundo Deyro	3; 6	6; 8	2; 6
3	(Indonesia) (Philippines)	Sutarjo Sugiarto / Gondo Widjojo; Eduardo Cruz / Alexander Marcial	3; 6	4; 6	6; 4	7; 9
4	(Indonesia) (Philippines)	Sutarjo Sugiarto; Eduardo Cruz						not played
5	(Indonesia) (Philippines)	Atet Wijono; Raymundo Deyro						not played

=== Semifinals ===
==== Japan vs. Philippines ====
Japan
5
Tokyo, Japan
18–20 April 1969

Philippines
0

			1	2	3	4	5
1	(Japan) (Philippines)	Koji Watanabe; Raymundo Deyro	6; 2	6; 1	6; 2
2	(Japan) (Philippines)	Keishiro Yanagi; Eduardo Cruz	6; 1	6; 3	6; 2
3	(Japan) (Philippines)	Junzo Kawamori / Koji Watanabe; Eduardo Cruz / Alexander Marcial	6; 4	6; 4	6; 3
4	(Japan) (Philippines)	Keishiro Yanagi; Raymundo Deyro	6; 1	6; 1	6; 2
5	(Japan) (Philippines)	Koji Watanabe; Eduardo Cruz	6; 3	6; 4	6; 4

==== South Korea vs. South Vietnam ====
South Korea
2
Seoul, South Korea
4–6 April 1969

South Vietnam
3

			1	2	3	4	5
1	(South Korea) (South Vietnam)	Chung Yong-ho; Lưu Hoàng Đức	6; 4	0; 6	5; 7	7; 9
2	(South Korea) (South Vietnam)	Kim Doo-hwan; Võ Văn Thành	4; 6	3; 6	6; 3	6; 4	5; 7
3	(South Korea) (South Vietnam)	Chung Yong-ho / Kim Doo-hwan; Võ Văn Bảy / Lưu Hoàng Đức	0; 6	0; 6	0; 6
4	(South Korea) (South Vietnam)	Kim Doo-hwan; Lưu Hoàng Đức	6; 3	2; 6	6; 4	6; 2
5	(South Korea) (South Vietnam)	Chung Yong-ho; Võ Văn Thành	6; 4	5; 7	2; 6	6; 3	8; 6

=== Final ===
Japan defeated South Vietnam by walkover.

== Zone B ==
=== Draw ===
Semifinals; 1–3 March
Kuala Lumpur, Malaysia
Malaysia	0
India	5
bye
Ceylon

Final; 25–27 March
Colombo, Ceylon (clay)
India	4
Ceylon	1

=== Semifinals ===
==== Malaysia vs. India ====
Malaysia
0
Kuala Lumpur, Malaysia
1–3 March 1969

India
5

			1	2	3	4	5
1	(Malaysia) (India)	Sultan-Aman Azman; Gaurav Misra	1; 6	1; 6	1; 6
2	(Malaysia) (India)	Billy Yap; Ramanathan Krishnan	2; 6	3; 6	1; 6
3	(Malaysia) (India)	Moses Tay / Billy Yap; Anand Amritraj / Gaurav Misra	4; 6	3; 6	4; 6
4	(Malaysia) (India)	Sultan-Aman Azman; Anand Amritraj	2; 6	2; 6	4; 6
5	(Malaysia) (India)	Abdul-Rahman Bakar; Gaurav Misra	2; 6	0; 6	4; 6

=== Final ===
==== Ceylon vs. India ====
Ceylon
1
Ceylon Lawn Tennis Association, Colombo, Ceylon
25–27 March 1969
Clay

India
4

			1	2	3	4	5
1	(Dominion of Ceylon) (India)	Senaka Kumara; Ramanathan Krishnan	0; 6	0; 6	0; 6
2	(Dominion of Ceylon) (India)	Rupert Ferdinands; Shiv Prakash Misra	3; 6	3; 6	3; 6
3	(Dominion of Ceylon) (India)	Rupert Ferdinands / Bernard Pinto; Anand Amritraj / Gaurav Misra	2; 6	7; 9	14; 12	7; 5	6; 4
4	(Dominion of Ceylon) (India)	Senaka Kumara; Shiv Prakash Misra	2; 6	2; 6	2; 6
5	(Dominion of Ceylon) (India)	Suresh Melvani; Anand Amritraj	2; 6	2; 6	1; 6

== Eastern Inter-Zonal Final ==
=== India vs. Japan ===
India
5
Poona, India
10–12 May 1969

Japan
0

			1	2	3	4	5
1	(India) (Japan)	Ramanathan Krishnan; Ichizō Konishi	6; 2	6; 4	6; 4
2	(India) (Japan)	Premjit Lall; Koji Watanabe	6; 2	6; 3	6; 4
3	(India) (Japan)	Premjit Lall / Jaidip Mukerjea; Isao Watanabe / Koji Watanabe	6; 3	13; 11	7; 9	6; 4
4	(India) (Japan)	Premjit Lall; Ichizō Konishi	6; 3	6; 1	6; 1
5	(India) (Japan)	Shiv Prakash Misra; Koji Watanabe	6; 3	6; 3	5; 7	6; 2
