= List of Ireland Davis Cup team representatives =

This is a list of tennis players who have represented the Ireland Davis Cup team in an official Davis Cup match. Ireland have taken part in the competition since 1923.

== Players ==
Player	W-L (Total)	W-L (Singles)	W-L (Doubles)	Ties	Debut
Vincent Allman-Smith	1–1	0–0	1–1	2	1930
Derek Arthurs	4–10	3–5	1–5	6	1962
Scott Barron	17–13	11–11	6–2	17	1993
Sam Barry	2–2	1–1	1–1	2	2012
John Biscomb	0–1	0–0	0–1	1	1979
William Brown	3–8	1–5	2–3	6	1970
James Buckley	0–3	0–3	0–0	2	1959
Tommy Burke	2–0	0–0	2–0	2	1982
Cecil Campbell	2–4	2–3	0–1	3	1923
Owen Casey	33–16	21–9	12–7	26	1988
Peter Clarke	6–6	5–6	1–0	7	2000
James Cluskey	0–6	0–0	0–6	6	2006
Eoin Collins	16–19	8–13	8–6	20	1987
Robert Collins	1–2	1–1	0–1	1	1999
Robin Condy	0–1	0–1	0–0	1	1962
Sean Cooper	1–1	1–1	0–0	2	2000
Shirley Dillon	0–3	0–2	0–1	1	1924
Robert Dolan	3–3	3–3	0–0	4	1982
John Doran	13–9	8–6	5–3	12	1996
Stewart Doyle	0–3	0–3	0–0	3	1991
Matt Doyle	27–17	19–10	8–7	17	1981
Desmond Early	1–0	0–0	1–0	1	1974
Raymond Egan	0–7	0–4	0–3	3	1939
Mark Farren	2–3	0–1	2–2	4	1994
Derek Farren	1–2	1–2	0–0	2	1992
Tristan Farron-Mahon	0–1	0–0	0–1	1	2006
Conor Gannon	2–4	1–2	1–2	3	2023
Vivian Gotto	1–4	0–2	1–2	3	1954
Joseph Hackett	8–16	4–10	4–6	10	1950
Tom Hamilton	1–2	0–0	1–2	3	1997
Peter Hannon	1–3	0–3	1–0	3	1981
Alan Haughton	0–2	0–2	0–0	1	1955
Ben Haughton	1–0	0–0	1–0	1	1926
Eoin Heavey	0–1	0–0	0–1	1	2008
Michael Hickey	13–27	6–16	7–11	19	1962
Noel Galway Holmes	0–1	0–0	0–1	1	1929
Guy Jackson	13–17	9–11	4–6	12	1948
Peter Jackson	9–24	7–20	2–4	18	1959
Cyril Kemp	8–14	6–9	2–5	9	1946
Barry King	3–3	2–2	1–1	4	2010
Peter Ledbetter	0–5	0–5	0–0	4	1973
George Lyttleton Rogers	24–25	18–15	6–10	17	1929
Arthur Mahony	0–3	0–2	0–1	1	1927
James McArdle	1–6	1–4	0–2	4	1976
D'Arcy McCrea	2–4	2–4	0–0	3	1923
John McGahon	4–2	0–1	4–1	5	2007
James McGee	9–6	6–3	3–3	7	2009
George McGill	1–0	1–0	0–0	1	1998
John McGrath	1–1	0–0	1–1	2	1970
Edward McGuire	6–20	4–16	2–4	12	1926
Joseph McHale	1–1	1–1	0–0	1	1947
George McVeagh	7–14	4–10	3–4	9	1933
Louis Meldon	2–7	1–4	1–3	5	1923
Kevin Menton	2–9	2–9	0–0	7	1974
Peter Mockler	0–1	0–1	0–0	1	1968
Sean Molloy	2–0	0–0	2–0	2	1988
David J. Mullins	1–5	0–2	1–3	5	2002
Matthew Murphy	5–1	3–1	2–0	2	1950
Freddy Murray	1–0	1–0	0–0	1	2023
Conor Niland	19–16	16–14	3–2	22	2000
Michael Nugent	1–3	1–3	0–0	4	1984
Stephen Nugent	1–1	1–1	0–0	2	2003
John O'Brien	0–1	0–0	0–1	1	1977
Colin O'Brien	4–3	3–1	1–2	4	2008
Denis O'Callaghan	0–3	0–2	0–1	1	1928
David O'Connell	4–1	0–0	4–1	5	2005
James Cecil Parke	6–5	6–3	0–2	5	1913
Kenneth Reid	2–2	2–1	0–1	3	1972
Hector Ryan	0–1	0–1	0–0	1	1938
Charles Scroope	2–6	0–4	2–2	4	1925
Simon Scroope	1–2	0–0	1–2	3	1923
Sean Sorensen	28–26	19–15	9–11	21	1976
Kevin Sorensen	12–8	7–5	5–3	14	2004
Louk Sorensen	10–2	10–2	0–0	10	2005
Peter Wright	16–11	8–7	8–4	13	1988
