= 1967 Davis Cup America Zone =

International tennis competition

The America Zone was one of the three regional zones of the 1967 Davis Cup.

7 teams entered the America Zone: 4 teams competed in the North & Central America Zone, while 3 teams competed in the South America Zone. The winner of each sub-zone would play against each other to determine who moved to the Inter-Zonal Zone to compete against the winners of the Eastern Zone and Europe Zone.

The United States defeated Mexico in the North & Central America Zone final, and Ecuador defeated Argentina in the South America Zone final. In the Americas Inter-Zonal Final, Ecuador defeated the United States and progressed to the Inter-Zonal Zone.

== North & Central America Zone ==
=== Draw ===
Semifinals; 15–30 April
Port of Spain, Trinidad and Tobago
United States	5
Caribbean/West Indies	0
Mexico City, Mexico (clay)
New Zealand	1
Mexico	4

Final; 27–30 May
Mexico City, Mexico (clay)
United States	4
Mexico	1

=== Semifinals ===
==== Caribbean/West Indies vs. United States ====
Caribbean/West Indies
0
Tranquility Square Lawn Tennis Club, Port of Spain, Trinidad and Tobago
28–30 April 1967

United States
5

			1	2	3	4	5
1	(Cricket West Indies) (United States)	Lance Lumsden; Charlie Pasarell	2; 6	2; 6	1; 6
2	(Cricket West Indies) (United States)	Richard Russell; Cliff Richey	2; 6	6; 1	5; 7	4; 6
3	(Cricket West Indies) (United States)	Lance Lumsden / Richard Russell; Clark Graebner / Marty Riessen	4; 6	2; 6	2; 6
4	(Cricket West Indies) (United States)	Richard Russell; Charlie Pasarell	2; 6	2; 6	2; 6
5	(Cricket West Indies) (United States)	Lance Lumsden; Cliff Richey	2; 6	4; 6	6; 4	2; 6

==== Mexico vs. New Zealand ====
Mexico
4
Centro Deportivo Chapultepec, Mexico City, Mexico
15–17 April 1967
Clay

New Zealand
1

			1	2	3	4	5
1	(Mexico) (New Zealand)	Rafael Osuna; Brian Fairlie	4; 6	6; 2	3; 6	6; 4	3; 6
2	(Mexico) (New Zealand)	Marcello Lara; Onny Parun	6; 1	6; 1	6; 1
3	(Mexico) (New Zealand)	Luis-Augusto García / Rafael Osuna; Brian Fairlie / Kevin Woolcott	11; 9	4; 6	6; 4	6; 4
4	(Mexico) (New Zealand)	Marcello Lara; Brian Fairlie	6; 2	6; 1	10; 8
5	(Mexico) (New Zealand)	Rafael Osuna; Onny Parun	6; 4	6; 1	6; 2

=== Final ===
==== Mexico vs. United States ====
Mexico
1
Centro Deportivo Chapultepec, Mexico City, Mexico
27–30 May 1967
Clay

United States
4

			1	2	3	4	5
1	(Mexico) (United States)	Rafael Osuna; Cliff Richey	6; 3	4; 6	1; 6	6; 3	6; 1
2	(Mexico) (United States)	Marcello Lara; Arthur Ashe	5; 7	2; 6	5; 7
3	(Mexico) (United States)	Joaquín Loyo Mayo / Rafael Osuna; Clark Graebner / Marty Riessen	4; 6	3; 6	5; 7
4	(Mexico) (United States)	Rafael Osuna; Arthur Ashe	6; 8	3; 6	2; 6
5	(Mexico) (United States)	Marcello Lara; Cliff Richey	6; 8	6; 3	3; 6	6; 2	4; 6

== South America Zone ==
=== Draw ===
Semifinals; 30 April–2 May
Buenos Aires, Argentina (clay)
Venezuela	0
Argentina	5
bye
Ecuador

Final; 28–30 May
Buenos Aires, Argentina (clay)
Argentina	1
Ecuador	4

=== Semifinals ===
==== Argentina vs. Venezuela ====
Argentina
5
Buenos Aires Lawn Tennis Club, Buenos Aires, Argentina
30 April–2 May 1967
Clay

Venezuela
0

			1	2	3	4	5
1	(Argentina) (Venezuela)	Julián Ganzábal; Humphrey Hose	6; 1	6; 2	6; 2
2	(Argentina) (Venezuela)	Roberto Aubone; Julio Moros	5; 7	6; 3	6; 3	6; 0
3	(Argentina) (Venezuela)	Roberto Aubone / Eduardo Soriano; Humphrey Hose / Julio Moros	6; 1	8; 6	7; 5
4	(Argentina) (Venezuela)	Julián Ganzábal; Jorge Andrew	6; 1	6; 4	6; 0
5	(Argentina) (Venezuela)	Eduardo Soriano; Humphrey Hose	6; 0	8; 6	6; 1

=== Final ===
==== Argentina vs. Ecuador ====
Argentina
1
Buenos Aires Lawn Tennis Club, Buenos Aires, Argentina
28–30 May 1967
Clay

Ecuador
4

			1	2	3	4	5
1	(Argentina) (Ecuador)	Julián Ganzábal; Pancho Guzmán	2; 6	6; 4	6; 2	6; 1
2	(Argentina) (Ecuador)	Roberto Aubone; Miguel Olvera	4; 6	1; 6	7; 5	0; 6
3	(Argentina) (Ecuador)	Roberto Aubone / Eduardo Soriano; Pancho Guzmán / Miguel Olvera	3; 6	6; 4	4; 6	6; 3	4; 6
4	(Argentina) (Ecuador)	Roberto Aubone; Pancho Guzmán	3; 6	3; 6	1; 6
5	(Argentina) (Ecuador)	Julián Ganzábal; Miguel Olvera	2; 6	2; 6	6; 8

== Americas Inter-Zonal Final ==
=== Ecuador vs. United States ===
Ecuador
3
Guayaquil Tennis Club, Guayaquil, Ecuador
17–19 June 1967
Clay

United States
2

			1	2	3	4	5
1	(Ecuador) (United States)	Pancho Guzmán; Cliff Richey	2; 6	6; 2	6; 8	4; 6
2	(Ecuador) (United States)	Miguel Olvera; Arthur Ashe	4; 6	6; 4	6; 4	6; 2
3	(Ecuador) (United States)	Pancho Guzmán / Miguel Olvera; Clark Graebner / Marty Riessen	0; 6	9; 7	6; 3	4; 6	8; 6
4	(Ecuador) (United States)	Pancho Guzmán; Arthur Ashe	0; 6	6; 4	6; 2	0; 6	6; 3
5	(Ecuador) (United States)	Miguel Olvera; Cliff Richey	7; 5	4; 6	5; 7	6; 4	0; 6
