= 1967 Davis Cup Eastern Zone =

International tennis competition

The Eastern Zone was one of the three regional zones of the 1967 Davis Cup.

9 teams entered the Eastern Zone, competing across 2 sub-zones. The winner of each sub-zones would play against each other to determine who would compete in the Inter-Zonal Zone against the winners of the America Zone and Europe Zone.

Japan defeated the Philippines in the Zone A final, and India defeated Iran in the Zone B final. In the Inter-Zonal final India defeated Japan and progressed to the Inter-Zonal Zone.

== Zone A ==
=== Draw ===
Quarterfinals; 25–27 March
Manila, Philippines
Philippines	5
South Korea	0
South Vietnam
bye
bye
Indonesia
bye
Japan

Semifinals; 14–16 April
Manila, Philippines
Philippines	5
South Vietnam	0
Jakarta, Indonesia
Indonesia	0
Japan	5

Final; 5–8 May
Tokyo, Japan
Philippines	0
Japan	5

=== Quarterfinals ===
==== Philippines vs. South Korea ====
Philippines
5
Manila, Philippines
25–27 March 1967

South Korea
0

			1	2	3	4	5
1	(Philippines) (South Korea)	Raymundo Deyro; Kim Doo-hwan	6; 2	6; 2	6; 0
2	(Philippines) (South Korea)	Felicisimo Ampon; Im Chung-yang	7; 5	6; 1	6; 2
3	(Philippines) (South Korea)	Samuel Ang / Eduardo Cruz; Im Chung-yang / Kim Doo-hwan	2; 6	6; 2	6; 3	6; 2
4	(Philippines) (South Korea)	Samuel Ang; Kim Doo-hwan	6; 4	6; 0	6; 1
5	(Philippines) (South Korea)	Eduardo Cruz; Im Chung-yang	6; 4	6; 4	6; 0

=== Semifinals ===
==== Philippines vs. South Vietnam ====
Philippines
5
Manila, Philippines
14–16 April 1967

South Vietnam
0

			1	2	3	4	5
1	(Philippines) (South Vietnam)	Eduardo Cruz; Võ Văn Bảy	6; 2	6; 3	6; 2
2	(Philippines) (South Vietnam)	Felicisimo Ampon; Võ Văn Thành	6; 4	6; 1	6; 1
3	(Philippines) (South Vietnam)	Samuel Ang / Eduardo Cruz; Võ Văn Bảy / Lưu Hoàng Đức	4; 6	19; 17	6; 2	6; 3
4	(Philippines) (South Vietnam)	Samuel Ang; Lưu Hoàng Đức	6; 3	6; 4	6; 1
5	(Philippines) (South Vietnam)	Eduardo Cruz; Võ Văn Thành	12; 10	9; 7	6; 1

==== Indonesia vs. Japan ====
Indonesia
0
Jakarta, Indonesia
14–16 April 1967

Japan
5

			1	2	3	4	5
1	(Indonesia) (Japan)	Gondo Widjojo; Keishiro Yanagi	2; 6	4; 6	5; 7
2	(Indonesia) (Japan)	Sutarjo Sugiarto; Ichizō Konishi	1; 6	2; 6
3	(Indonesia) (Japan)	Sutarjo Sugiarto / Gondo Widjojo; Isao Kobayashi / Koji Watanabe	8; 6	3; 6	3; 6	10; 8	3; 6
4	(Indonesia) (Japan)	Gondo Widjojo; Ichizō Konishi	1; 6	3; 6	2; 6
5	(Indonesia) (Japan)	Sutarjo Sugiarto; Keishiro Yanagi	6; 1	2; 6	4; 6	6; 4	1; 6

=== Final ===
==== Japan vs. Philippines ====
Japan
5
Tokyo, Japan
5–8 May 1967

Philippines
0

			1	2	3	4	5
1	(Japan) (Philippines)	Koji Watanabe; Samuel Ang	6; 2	6; 0	6; 2
2	(Japan) (Philippines)	Ichizō Konishi; Felicisimo Ampon	6; 1	6; 0	6; 4
3	(Japan) (Philippines)	Isao Watanabe / Koji Watanabe; Samuel Ang / Raymundo Deyro	6; 2	6; 2	6; 4
4	(Japan) (Philippines)	Ichizō Konishi; Samuel Ang	6; 4	6; 3	6; 2
5	(Japan) (Philippines)	Koji Watanabe; Felicisimo Ampon	6; 0	6; 1	6; 1

== Zone B ==
=== Draw ===
Semifinals; 25–27 February
Colombo, Ceylon (clay)
India	5
Ceylon	0
Iran	w/o
Malaysia

Final; 28–30 April
Tehran, Iran
India	4
Iran	1

=== Semifinals ===
==== Ceylon vs. India ====
Ceylon
0
Ceylon Lawn Tennis Association, Colombo, Ceylon
25–27 February 1967
Clay

India
5

			1	2	3	4	5
1	(Dominion of Ceylon) (India)	Lassantha Fernando; Jaidip Mukerjea	3; 6	4; 6	3; 6
2	(Dominion of Ceylon) (India)	Senaka Kumara; Shiv Prakash Misra	0; 6	2; 6	4; 6
3	(Dominion of Ceylon) (India)	Senaka Kumara / Bernard Pinto; Shiv Prakash Misra / Jaidip Mukerjea	4; 6	9; 11	3; 6
4	(Dominion of Ceylon) (India)	Lassantha Fernando; Ravi Venkatesan	2; 6	0; 6	0; 6
5	(Dominion of Ceylon) (India)	Kanagaratnam Arichandran; Jaidip Mukerjea	0; 6	1; 6	1; 6

=== Final ===
==== Iran vs. India ====
Iran
1
Tehran, Iran
28–30 April 1967

India
4

			1	2	3	4	5
1	(Iran) (India)	Ezzatollah Nemati; Shiv Prakash Misra	4; 6	1; 6	0; 6
2	(Iran) (India)	Taghi Akbari; Jaidip Mukerjea	5; 7	4; 6	7; 5	3; 6
3	(Iran) (India)	Hussain Akbari / Taghi Akbari; Shiv Prakash Misra / Jaidip Mukerjea	4; 6	3; 6	3; 6
4	(Iran) (India)	Issa Khodaei; Jaidip Mukerjea	4; 6	5; 7	4; 6
5	(Iran) (India)	Taghi Akbari; Shiv Prakash Misra	6; 2	3; 0				retired

== Eastern Inter-Zonal Final ==
=== India vs. Japan ===
India
4
New Delhi, India
29 September–1 October 1967

Japan
1

			1	2	3	4	5
1	(India) (Japan)	Premjit Lall; Koji Watanabe	6; 2	6; 4	6; 2
2	(India) (Japan)	Jaidip Mukerjea; Ichizō Konishi	3; 6	6; 3	5; 7	9; 7	6; 3
3	(India) (Japan)	Ramanathan Krishnan / Premjit Lall; Isao Watanabe / Koji Watanabe	6; 2	6; 4	4; 6	6; 0
4	(India) (Japan)	Jaidip Mukerjea; Koji Watanabe	8; 6	2; 6	2; 6	1; 6
5	(India) (Japan)	Premjit Lall; Ichizō Konishi	6; 2	9; 7	6; 3
