= Tom Rushby =

English cricketer (1880–1962)

Personal information
- Born: 6 September 1880; Stoke d'Abernon, Cobham, Surrey
- Died: 13 July 1962 (aged 81); Ewell, Surrey
- Batting: Right-handed
- Bowling: Right-arm fast-medium

Career statistics
Competition	First-class
Matches	229
Runs scored	1,187
Batting average	7.41
100s/50s	0/1
Top score	58*
Balls bowled	44,971
Wickets	954
Bowling average	20.58
5 wickets in innings	58
10 wickets in match	9
Best bowling	10/43
Catches/stumpings	64/–
- Source: CricketArchive, 14 April 2023

Thomas Rushby (6 September 1880 – 13 July 1962) was an English cricketer. He was a right-arm fast-medium bowler who played for Surrey from 1903 to 1921. In all first-class matches, he took 954 wickets at an average of 20.58. In his final season, he took all ten wickets for 43 runs in the Somerset first innings at Taunton.
