= Peter Jackson (tennis) =

Irish tennis player

- Country (sports): Ireland
- Born: 22 September 1934
- Died: 10 October 2014 (aged 80)
- Plays: Right-handed

Singles

Grand Slam singles results
- US Open: 1R (1962)

Doubles

Grand Slam doubles results
- Wimbledon: 1R (1958, 1961)

Peter Jackson (22 September 1934 — 10 October 2014) was an Irish international tennis player originating from Northern Ireland.

Raised in Belfast, UK, Jackson was a junior rugby representative for Ulster before settling on tennis. He attended the Belfast Royal Academy and played his tennis at the Windsor Lawn Tennis Club, although he began his career with Cavehill. An Irish number one for nine consecutive years, he featured at both Wimbledon and the U.S. National Championships during his career.

Jackson debuted for the Irish Davis Cup team in 1959 and had the first of his seven singles wins in 1962 over Austria's Detlef Herdy. In Dublin in 1970 he came from two sets down to lose in five against Yugoslavia's Željko Franulović, who two-weeks later reached the French Open final. A disagreement with selectors prompted his tennis retirement in 1973, finishing his career with 33 Davis Cup appearances across singles and doubles, from 18 ties.

== See also ==
- List of Ireland Davis Cup team representatives
