= Andrew Coelho =

Australian tennis player

- Country (sports): Australia
- Born: 2 October 1987 (age 38) Melbourne, Australia
- Height: 5 ft 11 in (180 cm)
- Plays: Left-handed
- Prize money: $106,145

Singles
- Career record: 0–0
- Career titles: 0; 0 Challenger, 4 Futures
- Highest ranking: No. 281 (3 November 2008)

Grand Slam singles results
- Australian Open: Q1 (2006, 2007, 2008, 2009)
- Wimbledon: Q1 (2008)

Doubles
- Career record: 3–4
- Career titles: 0; 1 Challenger, 8 Futures
- Highest ranking: No. 207 (5 November 2007)

Grand Slam doubles results
- Australian Open: 3R (2009)
- Last updated on: 5 July 2021.

Andrew Coelho (born 2 October 1987) is a retired professional Australian tennis player.

Coelho's highest ATP singles ranking is World No. 281, which he reached on 3 November 2008. His career high in doubles was at 207 set at 5 November 2007.

== ATP Challenger and ITF Futures finals ==
=== Singles: 6 (4–2) ===
Legend ATP Challenger (0–0) ITF Futures (4–2)	Finals by surface Hard (4–2) Clay (0–0) Grass (0–0) Carpet (0–0)

Result	W–L	Date	Tournament	Tier	Surface	Opponent	Score
Loss	0–1	Oct 2006	Australia F10, Traralgon	Futures	Hard	(Australia) Colin Ebelthite	1–6, 4–6
Win	1–1	Nov 2007	Australia F9, Happy Valley	Futures	Hard	(Barbados) Haydn Lewis	6–4, 6–1
Win	2–1	Nov 2007	Australia F10, Adelaide	Futures	Hard	(Australia) Colin Ebelthite	6–3, 6–2
Win	3–1	Sep 2008	Australia F7, Gympie	Futures	Hard	(Australia) Nick Lindahl	6–3, 6–4
Loss	3–2	Oct 2008	Australia F8, Traralgon	Futures	Hard	(Australia) John Millman	2–6, 3–6
Win	4–2	Nov 2008	Australia F11, Perth	Futures	Hard	(Australia) Brendan McKenzie	7–6^{(7–5)}, 6–4

=== Doubles: 15 (9–6) ===
Legend ATP Challenger (1–0) ITF Futures (8–6)	Finals by surface Hard (6–4) Clay (1–0) Grass (1–2) Carpet (1–0)

Result	W–L	Date	Tournament	Tier	Surface	Partner	Opponents	Score
Win	1–0	Nov 2005	Australia F9, Aberfoyle Park	Futures	Hard	(Australia) Carsten Ball	(Australia) Adam Feeney (Australia) Joel Kerley	6–7^{(9–11)}, 6–4, [15–13]
Win	2–0	Nov 2005	Australia F10, Berri	Futures	Grass	(Australia) Carsten Ball	(India) Rohan Bopanna (Romania) Horia Tecău	5–7, 6–3, [10–5]
Loss	2–1	Jul 2006	Great Britain F10, Frinton-on-Sea	Futures	Grass	(Australia) Sam Groth	(United Kingdom) Andrew Kennaugh (United Kingdom) Tom Rushby	5–7, 7–6^{(7–3)}, 4–6
Loss	2–2	Mar 2007	Great Britain F6, Sunderland	Futures	Hard	(Australia) Sam Groth	(United Kingdom) Jamie Baker (Pakistan) Aisam Qureshi	3–6, 6–3, 3–6
Win	3–2	Jun 2007	Spain F21, Puerto Cruz	Futures	Carpet	(Australia) Sam Groth	(Spain) Agustin Boje-Ordonez (Spain) Pablo Martin-Adalia	6–4, 7–6^{(7–5)}
Win	4–2	Aug 2007	Karshi, Uzbekistan	Challenger	Hard	(Australia) Adam Feeney	(Bosnia and Herzegovina) Ivan Dodig (Romania) Horia Tecău	6–2, 3–6, [10–7]
Win	5–2	Sep 2007	France F12, Bagnères-de-Bigorre	Futures	Hard	(Australia) Sam Groth	(New Zealand) Daniel King-Turner (France) Pierrick Ysern	6–4, 4–6, [10–6]
Win	6–2	Oct 2007	Portugal F5, Espinho	Futures	Clay	(Finland) Timo Nieminen	(Spain) Guillermo Olaso (Croatia) Franko Škugor	6–3, 3–6, [10–3]
Loss	6–3	Oct 2007	Australia F8, Traralgon	Futures	Hard	(Australia) Greg Jones	(Australia) Matthew Ebden (Australia) Brydan Klein	6–7^{(6–8)}, 1–6
Loss	6–4	Feb 2008	Australia F1, Mildura	Futures	Grass	(Australia) Brydan Klein	(Australia) Sam Groth (Australia) Nathan Healey	3–6, 4–6
Win	7–4	Mar 2008	New Zealand F1, Wellington	Futures	Hard	(Australia) Brydan Klein	(Australia) Isaac Frost (Australia) Leon Frost	6–1, 6–3
Loss	7–5	Mar 2008	New Zealand F2, Hamilton	Futures	Hard	(Australia) Brydan Klein	(New Zealand) Mikal Statham (Australia) Nathan Healey	5–7, 6–3, [8–10]
Win	8–5	Sep 2008	Australia F5, Rockhampton	Futures	Hard	(Australia) Adam Feeney	(New Zealand) Daniel King-Turner (New Zealand) José Statham	1–6, 7–6^{(7–4)}, [11–9]
Win	9–5	Sep 2008	Australia F6, Kawana	Futures	Hard	(Australia) Adam Feeney	(Australia) David Barclay (Australia) Marc Kimmich	6–3, 6–0
Loss	9–6	Jun 2009	USA F13, Sacramento	Futures	Hard	(Australia) Adam Feeney	(United States) Lester Cook (Philippines) Treat Huey	4–6, 6–3, [2–10]
