= Michael Hickey (tennis) =

Irish tennis player

- Full name: Michael P. Hickey
- Country (sports): (Republic of Ireland) Ireland
- Plays: Right–handed

Singles

Grand Slam singles results
- French Open: 1R (1969)

Doubles

Grand Slam doubles results
- French Open: 2R (1969)
- Wimbledon: 2R (1969)

Michael P. Hickey is an Irish former tennis and squash player.

A native of Limerick, Hickey was an Ireland number one at various times during his career and had a stint playing on the professional tour, which he joined in the late 1960s. He was a regular member of the Ireland Davis Cup team through the 1960s and 1970s, setting a national record with appearances in 19 ties. His Davis Cup career included a loss to Björn Borg at Fitzwilliam in Dublin in 1978. He was a three–time County Dublin singles champion.

Hickey also served as non–playing captain of Ireland in the Davis Cup and was a coach of Sean Sorensen.

Hickey also represented Ireland at squash.

== See also ==
- List of Ireland Davis Cup team representatives
