= 1969 Davis Cup =

1969 edition of the Davis Cup

Details
- Duration: 1 March – 21 September 1969
- Edition: 58th
- Teams: 50

Champion
- Winning nation: United States

The 1969 Davis Cup was the 58th edition of the Davis Cup, the most important tournament between national teams in men's tennis. 32 teams entered the Europe Zone, 9 teams entered the Americas Zone, and 8 teams entered the Eastern Zone.

Brazil defeated Mexico in the Americas Inter-Zonal final, India defeated Japan in the Eastern Inter-Zonal final, and Great Britain and Romania were the winners of the two Europe Zones, defeating South Africa and the Soviet Union respectively.

In the Inter-Zonal Zone, Romania defeated India and Great Britain defeated Brazil in the semifinals, and then Romania defeated Great Britain in the final. Romania were then defeated by the defending champions United States in the Challenge Round. The final was played at the Harold Clark Courts in Cleveland, Ohio, United States on 19–21 September. This marked the first time the final was played on hard courts and the first final since 1937 not to feature Australia.

== Americas Zone ==
=== North & Central America Zone ===
Semifinals; 3–5 May
Bridgetown, Barbados
Mexico	4
Caribbean/West Indies	1
bye
Australia

Final; 23–25 May
Mexico City, Mexico (clay)
Mexico	3
Australia	2

=== South America Zone ===
Quarterfinals; 2–5 May
Brazil
bye
Caracas, Venezuela
Venezuela	2
Colombia	3
Santiago, Chile
Chile	3
Argentina	2
bye
Ecuador

Semifinals; 16–18 May
Bogotá, Colombia
Brazil	3
Colombia	2
Santiago, Chile (clay)
Chile	4
Ecuador	1

Final; 14–16 June
Santiago, Chile
Brazil	3
Chile	2

=== Americas Inter-Zonal Final ===
Brazil vs. Mexico

Brazil
4
Esporte Clube Pinheiros, São Paulo, Brazil
19–21 June 1969
Clay

Mexico
1

			1	2	3	4	5
1	(Brazil) (Mexico)	José Edison Mandarino; Marcelo Lara	4; 6	6; 2	6; 4	5; 7	6; 3
2	(Brazil) (Mexico)	Thomaz Koch; Joaquín Loyo Mayo	7; 5	6; 1	6; 3
3	(Brazil) (Mexico)	Thomaz Koch / José Edison Mandarino; Luis-Augusto García / Joaquín Loyo Mayo	19; 17	6; 3	6; 4
4	(Brazil) (Mexico)	José Edison Mandarino; Joaquín Loyo Mayo	6; 2	7; 5	5; 7	3; 6	5; 7
5	(Brazil) (Mexico)	Thomaz Koch; Luis-Augusto García	4; 6	6; 1	6; 2	6; 4

== Eastern Zone ==
=== Zone A ===
Quarterfinals; 28–30 March
Jakarta, Indonesia
Indonesia	0
Philippines	3
Japan
bye
bye
South Korea
bye
South Vietnam

Semifinals; 4–20 April
Tokyo, Japan
Philippines	0
Japan	5
Seoul, South Korea
South Korea	2
South Vietnam	3

Final
Japan	w/o
South Vietnam

=== Zone B ===
Semifinals; 1–3 March
Kuala Lumpur, Malaysia
Malaysia	0
India	5
bye
Ceylon

Final; 25–27 March
Colombo, Ceylon (clay)
India	4
Ceylon	1

=== Eastern Inter-Zonal Final ===
India vs. Japan

India
5
Poona, India
10–12 May 1969

Japan
0

			1	2	3	4	5
1	(India) (Japan)	Ramanathan Krishnan; Ichizō Konishi	6; 2	6; 4	6; 4
2	(India) (Japan)	Premjit Lall; Koji Watanabe	6; 2	6; 3	6; 4
3	(India) (Japan)	Premjit Lall / Jaidip Mukerjea; Isao Watanabe / Koji Watanabe	6; 3	13; 11	7; 9	6; 4
4	(India) (Japan)	Premjit Lall; Ichizō Konishi	6; 3	6; 1	6; 1
5	(India) (Japan)	Shiv Prakash Misra; Koji Watanabe	6; 3	6; 3	5; 7	6; 2

== Europe Zone ==
=== Zone A ===
First Round; 24 April–11 May
Cologne, West Germany
West Germany	4
New Zealand	1
Helsinki, Finland (clay)
Finland	1
Sweden	4
Zürich, Switzerland (clay)
Switzerland	0
Great Britain	5
Cork, Ireland
Ireland	5
Luxembourg	0
Monte Carlo, Monaco
Monaco	3
Bulgaria	2
Copenhagen, Denmark (clay)
Denmark	2
Czechoslovakia	3
Warsaw, Poland
Poland	3
Hungary	2
Cape Town, South Africa
Iran	0
South Africa	5

Quarterfinals; 22–26 May
Båstad, Sweden (clay)
West Germany	4
Sweden	1
Eastbourne, England (grass)
Great Britain	5
Ireland	0
Monte Carlo, Monaco (clay)
Monaco	0
Czechoslovakia	5
Poland
South Africa	w/o

Semifinals; 12–14 June
Birmingham, England (grass)
West Germany	2
Great Britain	3
Czechoslovakia
South Africa	w/o

Final; 17–19 July
Bristol, England (grass)
Great Britain	3
South Africa	2

==== Zone A Final ====
Great Britain vs. South Africa

Great Britain
3
Bristol Lawn Tennis Club, Bristol, England
17–19 July 1969
Grass

South Africa
2

			1	2	3	4	5
1	(United Kingdom) (South Africa)	Mark Cox; Bob Maud	3; 6	6; 3	6; 4	3; 6	6; 4
2	(United Kingdom) (South Africa)	Graham Stilwell; Bob Hewitt	9; 7	3; 6	6; 3	2; 6	3; 6
3	(United Kingdom) (South Africa)	Mark Cox / Peter Curtis; Bob Hewitt / Frew McMillan	6; 4	3; 6	4; 6	6; 4	9; 7
4	(United Kingdom) (South Africa)	Graham Stilwell; Bob Maud	8; 6	11; 9	6; 3
5	(United Kingdom) (South Africa)	Mark Cox; Bob Hewitt	6; 3	0; 6	6; 4	3; 6	7; 9

=== Zone B ===
First Round; 4–12 May
Lisbon, Portugal (clay)
Spain	5
Rhodesia	0
Maribor, Yugoslavia
Yugoslavia	3
France	2
Bucharest, Romania (clay)
Romania	3
Egypt	2
Lisbon, Portugal (clay)
Portugal	1
Israel	4
Athens, Greece
Greece	0
Soviet Union	5
Scheveningen, Netherlands (clay)
Netherlands	2
Canada	3
Oslo, Norway (clay)
Norway	0
Austria	5
Genoa, Italy (clay)
Belgium	1
Italy	4

Quarterfinals; 22–25 May
Zagreb, Yugoslavia (clay)
Spain	5
Yugoslavia	0
Bucharest, Romania (clay)
Romania	5
Israel	0
Moscow, Soviet Union (clay)
Soviet Union	4
Canada	1
Barletta, Italy (clay)
Austria	0
Italy	5

Semifinals; 13–15 June
Valencia, Spain (clay)
Spain	1
Romania	4
Moscow, Soviet Union
Soviet Union	5
Italy	0

Final; 18–20 July
Bucharest, Romania (clay)
Romania	4
Soviet Union	1

==== Zone B Final ====
Romania vs. Soviet Union

Romania
4
Bucharest, Romania
18–20 July 1969
Clay

Soviet Union
1

			1	2	3	4	5
1	(Romania) (Soviet Union)	Ion Țiriac; Toomas Leius	6; 3	6; 3	8; 6
2	(Romania) (Soviet Union)	Ilie Năstase; Alex Metreveli	6; 4	6; 2	7; 5
3	(Romania) (Soviet Union)	Ilie Năstase / Ion Țiriac; Sergei Likhachev / Alex Metreveli	6; 8	6; 1	6; 4	8; 6
4	(Romania) (Soviet Union)	Ilie Năstase; Toomas Leius	4; 6	6; 3	6; 2	6; 2
5	(Romania) (Soviet Union)	Sever Dron; Vladimir Korotkov	1; 6	4; 6	4; 6

== Inter-Zonal Zone ==
=== Draw ===
Semifinals; 31 July–3 August
Bucharest, Romania (clay)
EUR-B	Romania	4
EAS	India	0
Wimbledon, England (grass)
AME	Brazil	2
EUR-A	Great Britain	3

Final; 14–16 August
Wimbledon, England (grass)
EUR-A	Romania	3
EUR-B	Great Britain	2

=== Semifinals ===
Romania vs. India

Romania
4
Bucharest, Romania
1–3 August 1969
Clay

India
0

			1	2	3	4	5
1	(Romania) (India)	Ion Țiriac; Premjit Lall	6; 2	6; 3	6; 2
2	(Romania) (India)	Ilie Năstase; Jaidip Mukerjea	6; 2	6; 4	4; 6	4; 6	6; 1
3	(Romania) (India)	Ilie Năstase / Ion Țiriac; Premjit Lall / Jaidip Mukerjea	6; 2	6; 2	6; 3
4	(Romania) (India)	Petre Mărmureanu; Gaurav Misra	6; 2	6; 2	6; 3
5	(Romania) (India)	Sever Dron; Anand Amritraj	6; 3	6; 2	8; 10			not completed

Great Britain vs. Brazil

Great Britain
3
No. 1 Court, All England Club, Wimbledon, England
31 July–3 August 1969
Grass

Brazil
2

			1	2	3	4	5
1	(United Kingdom) (Brazil)	Graham Stilwell; José Edison Mandarino	6; 3	8; 6	8; 6
2	(United Kingdom) (Brazil)	Mark Cox; Thomaz Koch	6; 4	13; 11	3; 6	6; 8	6; 8
3	(United Kingdom) (Brazil)	Mark Cox / Peter Curtis; Thomaz Koch / José Edison Mandarino	6; 4	4; 6	4; 6	4; 6
4	(United Kingdom) (Brazil)	Graham Stilwell; Thomaz Koch	7; 5	6; 4	6; 4
5	(United Kingdom) (Brazil)	Mark Cox; José Edison Mandarino	6; 3	18; 16	3; 6	6; 2

=== Final ===
Great Britain vs. Romania

Great Britain
2
No. 1 Court, All England Club, Wimbledon, England
14–16 August 1969
Grass

Romania
3

			1	2	3	4	5
1	(United Kingdom) (Romania)	Mark Cox; Ion Țiriac	4; 6	4; 6	3; 6
2	(United Kingdom) (Romania)	Graham Stilwell; Ilie Năstase	6; 4	4; 6	6; 1	6; 2
3	(United Kingdom) (Romania)	Mark Cox / Graham Stilwell; Ilie Năstase / Ion Țiriac	8; 10	6; 3	3; 6	4; 6
4	(United Kingdom) (Romania)	Graham Stilwell; Ion Țiriac	6; 3	6; 2	6; 2
5	(United Kingdom) (Romania)	Mark Cox; Ilie Năstase	6; 3	1; 6	4; 6	4; 6

== Challenge Round ==
United States vs. Romania

United States
5
Harold Clark Courts, Cleveland, Ohio, United States
19–21 September 1969
Hard

Romania
0

			1	2	3	4	5
1	(United States) (Romania)	Arthur Ashe; Ilie Năstase	6; 2	15; 13	7; 5
2	(United States) (Romania)	Stan Smith; Ion Țiriac	6; 8	6; 3	5; 7	6; 4	6; 4
3	(United States) (Romania)	Bob Lutz / Stan Smith; Ilie Năstase / Ion Țiriac	8; 6	6; 1	11; 9
4	(United States) (Romania)	Stan Smith; Ilie Năstase	4; 6	4; 6	6; 4	6; 1	11; 9
5	(United States) (Romania)	Arthur Ashe; Ion Țiriac	6; 3	8; 6	3; 6	4; 0		retired
