= Tristan Farron-Mahon =

Irish professional tennis player

- Country (sports): Ireland
- Born: 26 May 1987 (age 37); Dublin, Ireland
- Plays: Right-handed
- Prize money: $10,766

Singles
- Highest ranking: No. 870 (2 Nov 2009)

Doubles
- Career record: 0–1 (Davis Cup)
- Highest ranking: No. 501 (1 Mar 2010)

Tristan Farron-Mahon (born 26 May 1987) is an Irish former professional tennis player.

A native of Dublin, Farron-Mahon relocated to Florida as a child for training and became a top-50 player on the ITF junior circuit. During his junior career he partnered with Marin Čilić in doubles at Wimbledon and the pair won a title together in Roehampton. He was named a National Junior Sports Star by the Irish Examiner for 2005. Due to having a Swiss grandfather, there was purportedly some interest by Switzerland to have him switch allegiances.

Farron-Mahon, who won three ITF Futures doubles titles, made a Davis Cup appearance for Ireland against Finland in Helsinki in 2006. He partnered Kevin Sorensen for the doubles rubber, which they lost to Tuomas Ketola and Jarkko Nieminen. In a professional career hampered by injury he attained best rankings of 870 in singles and 501 in doubles.

== ITF Futures finals ==
=== Doubles: 7 (3–4) ===
Result	W–L	Date	Tournament	Surface	Partner	Opponents	Score
Loss	0–1	May 2008	Greece F3, Kalamata	Hard	(Netherlands) Bart Beks	(United Kingdom) Neil Bamford (United Kingdom) Matthew Illingworth	3–6, 1–6
Loss	0–2	Aug 2008	Finland F1, Vierumäki	Clay	(Australia) Nick Trkulja	(Estonia) Mait Künnap (Spain) Jordi Marse-Vidri	2–6, 4–6
Loss	0–3	Mar 2009	Portugal F1, Faro	Hard	(Austria) Richard Ruckelshausen	(Spain) Agustin Boje-Ordonez (Spain) Ignacio Coll Riudavets	3–6, 1–6
Loss	0–4	Jul 2009	Great Britain F8, Felixstowe	Grass	(Sweden) Andreas Siljeström	(Australia) Greg Jones (Australia) Robert Smeets	2–6, 4–6
Win	1–4	Jul 2009	Great Britain F9, Frinton	Grass	(Republic of Ireland) Colin O'Brien	(United Kingdom) Neil Pauffley (United Kingdom) Marcus Willis	6–7^{(5)}, 7–6^{(3)}, [10–6]
Win	2–4	Aug 2009	Latvia F1, Jūrmala	Clay	(Denmark) Thomas Kromann	(Latvia) Arturs Kazijevs (Latvia) Miķelis Lībietis	6–4, 6–2
Win	3–4	Aug 2009	Finland F1, Vierumäki	Clay	(Sweden) Andreas Siljeström	(Finland) Juho Paukku (Sweden) Patrik Rosenholm	6–3, 6–3

== See also ==
- List of Ireland Davis Cup team representatives
