= 1967 Davis Cup =

1967 edition of the Davis Cup

Details
- Duration: 25 March – 28 December 1967
- Edition: 56th
- Teams: 48

Champion
- Winning nation: Australia

The 1967 Davis Cup was the 56th edition of the Davis Cup, the most important tournament between national teams in men's tennis. 32 teams entered the Europe Zone, 9 teams entered the Eastern Zone, and 7 teams entered the America Zone.

Ecuador defeated the United States in the Americas Inter-Zonal final, India defeated Japan in the Eastern Inter-Zonal final, and Spain and South Africa were the winners of the two Europe sub-zones, defeating the Soviet Union and Brazil respectively.

In the Inter-Zonal Zone, Spain defeated Ecuador and South Africa defeated India in the semifinals, and then Spain defeated South Africa in the final. Spain were then defeated by the defending champions Australia in the Challenge Round. The final was played at the Milton Courts in Brisbane, Australia on 26–28 December.

== America Zone ==
=== North & Central America Zone ===
Semifinals; 15–30 April
Port of Spain, Trinidad and Tobago
United States	5
Caribbean/West Indies	0
Mexico City, Mexico (clay)
New Zealand	1
Mexico	4

Final; 27–30 May
Mexico City, Mexico (clay)
United States	4
Mexico	1

=== South America Zone ===
Semifinals; 30 April–2 May
Buenos Aires, Argentina (clay)
Venezuela	0
Argentina	5
bye
Ecuador

Final; 28–30 May
Buenos Aires, Argentina (clay)
Argentina	1
Ecuador	4

=== Americas Inter-Zonal Final ===
Ecuador vs. United States

Ecuador
3
Guayaquil Tennis Club, Guayaquil, Ecuador
17–19 June 1967
Clay

United States
2

			1	2	3	4	5
1	(Ecuador) (United States)	Pancho Guzmán; Cliff Richey	2; 6	6; 2	6; 8	4; 6
2	(Ecuador) (United States)	Miguel Olvera; Arthur Ashe	4; 6	6; 4	6; 4	6; 2
3	(Ecuador) (United States)	Pancho Guzmán / Miguel Olvera; Clark Graebner / Marty Riessen	0; 6	9; 7	6; 3	4; 6	8; 6
4	(Ecuador) (United States)	Pancho Guzmán; Arthur Ashe	0; 6	6; 4	6; 2	0; 6	6; 3
5	(Ecuador) (United States)	Miguel Olvera; Cliff Richey	7; 5	4; 6	5; 7	6; 4	0; 6

== Eastern Zone ==
=== Zone A ===
Quarterfinals; 25–27 March
Manila, Philippines
Philippines	5
South Korea	0
South Vietnam
bye
bye
Indonesia
bye
Japan

Semifinals; 14–16 April
Manila, Philippines
Philippines	5
South Vietnam	0
Jakarta, Indonesia
Indonesia	0
Japan	5

Final; 5–8 May
Tokyo, Japan
Philippines	0
Japan	5

=== Zone B ===
Semifinals; 25–27 February
Colombo, Ceylon (clay)
India	5
Ceylon	0
Iran	w/o
Malaysia

Final; 28–30 April
Tehran, Iran
India	4
Iran	1

=== Eastern Inter-Zonal Final ===
India vs. Japan

India
4
New Delhi, India
29 September–1 October 1967

Japan
1

			1	2	3	4	5
1	(India) (Japan)	Premjit Lall; Koji Watanabe	6; 2	6; 4	6; 2
2	(India) (Japan)	Jaidip Mukerjea; Ichizō Konishi	3; 6	6; 3	5; 7	9; 7	6; 3
3	(India) (Japan)	Ramanathan Krishnan / Premjit Lall; Isao Watanabe / Koji Watanabe	6; 2	6; 4	4; 6	6; 0
4	(India) (Japan)	Jaidip Mukerjea; Koji Watanabe	8; 6	2; 6	2; 6	1; 6
5	(India) (Japan)	Premjit Lall; Ichizō Konishi	6; 2	9; 7	6; 3

== Europe Zone ==
=== Zone A ===
First Round; 28 April–8 May
Sofia, Bulgaria (clay)
Bulgaria	5
Portugal	0
Bournemouth, England (clay)
Canada	1
Great Britain	4
Bucharest, Romania (clay)
Romania	4
Belgium	1
San Sebastián, Spain (clay)
Egypt	0
Spain	5
Geneva, Switzerland
Switzerland	2
Greece	3
Prague, Czechoslovakia (clay)
Chile	3
Czechoslovakia	2
Helsinki, Finland (clay)
Finland	1
Denmark	4
Düsseldorf, West Germany
Soviet Union	3
West Germany	2

Quarterfinals; 19–23 May
Sofia, Bulgaria (clay)
Bulgaria	0
Great Britain	5
Bucharest, Romania (clay)
Romania	2
Spain	3
Athens, Greece
Greece	2
Chile	3
Copenhagen, Denmark (clay)
Denmark	2
Soviet Union	3

Semifinals; 7–10 June
Eastbourne, England (grass)
Great Britain	2
Spain	3
Moscow, Soviet Union
Chile	0
Soviet Union	3

Final; 14–16 July
Barcelona, Spain (clay)
Spain	4
Soviet Union	1

==== Zone A Final ====
Spain vs. Soviet Union

Spain
4
Real Club de Tenis, Barcelona, Spain
14–16 July 1967
Clay

Soviet Union
1

			1	2	3	4	5
1	(Spain) (Soviet Union)	Manuel Santana; Toomas Leius	6; 3	6; 4	6; 1
2	(Spain) (Soviet Union)	Juan Gisbert; Alex Metreveli	3; 6	2; 6	6; 3	7; 5	6; 2
3	(Spain) (Soviet Union)	José Luis Arilla / Manuel Santana; Sergei Likhachev / Alex Metreveli	3; 6	6; 3	4; 6	4; 6
4	(Spain) (Soviet Union)	Manuel Santana; Alex Metreveli	6; 0	6; 3	6; 3
5	(Spain) (Soviet Union)	Juan Gisbert; Toomas Leius	2; 6	6; 4	6; 3	6; 0

=== Zone B ===
First Round; 28 April–7 May
Paris, France (clay)
France	5
Norway	0
Budapest, Hungary (clay)
Hungary	4
Sweden	1
Monte Carlo, Monaco
Monaco	5
Turkey	0
Scheveningen, Netherlands (clay)
Netherlands	2
South Africa	3
Verona, Italy (clay)
Italy	5
Austria	0
Mondorf-les-Bains, Luxembourg
Luxembourg	3
Ireland	2
Warsaw, Poland
Poland	5
Israel	0
Zagreb, Yugoslavia
Yugoslavia	2
Brazil	3

Quarterfinals; 19–21 May
Paris, France (clay)
France	5
Hungary	0
Monte Carlo, Monaco
Monaco	0
South Africa	5
Piacenza, Italy (clay)
Italy	5
Luxembourg	0
Warsaw, Poland
Poland	0
Brazil	5

Semifinals; 8–11 June
Paris, France (clay)
France	0
South Africa	5
Naples, Italy (clay)
Italy	1
Brazil	3

Final; 20–22 July
Durban, South Africa
South Africa	5
Brazil	0

==== Zone B Final ====
South Africa vs. Brazil

South Africa
5
Durban, South Africa
20–22 July 1967

Brazil
0

			1	2	3	4	5
1	(South Africa) (Brazil)	Bob Hewitt; Thomaz Koch	6; 4	9; 11	11; 9	6; 2
2	(South Africa) (Brazil)	Cliff Drysdale; José Edison Mandarino	6; 2	8; 6	6; 2
3	(South Africa) (Brazil)	Bob Hewitt / Frew McMillan; Thomaz Koch / José Edison Mandarino	1; 6	4; 6	6; 3	6; 4	6; 3
4	(South Africa) (Brazil)	Bob Hewitt; José Edison Mandarino	1; 6	3; 6	6; 4	6; 2	6; 0
5	(South Africa) (Brazil)	Cliff Drysdale; Thomaz Koch	6; 3	8; 6	6; 4

== Inter-Zonal Zone ==
=== Draw ===
Semifinals; 21 September–12 November
Barcelona, Spain (clay)
EUR-B	South Africa	5
EAS	India	0
Barcelona, Spain (clay)
AME	Ecuador	0
EUR-A	Spain	5

Final; 30 November–4 December
Johannesburg, South Africa (hard)
EUR-B	South Africa	2
EUR-A	Spain	3

=== Semifinals ===
India vs. South Africa

India
0
Barcelona, Spain
10–12 November 1967
Clay

South Africa
5

			1	2	3	4	5
1	(India) (South Africa)	Ramanathan Krishnan; Bob Hewitt	6; 3	3; 6	2; 6	6; 2	6; 8
2	(India) (South Africa)	Jaidip Mukerjea; Cliff Drysdale	1; 6	0; 6	0; 6
3	(India) (South Africa)	Ramanathan Krishnan / Jaidip Mukerjea; Bob Hewitt / Frew McMillan	2; 6	5; 7	2; 6
4	(India) (South Africa)	Ramanathan Krishnan; Cliff Drysdale	5; 7	4; 6	6; 3	3; 6
5	(India) (South Africa)	Jaidip Mukerjea; Bob Maud	1; 6	2; 6	3; 6

Spain vs. Ecuador

Spain
5
Real Club de Tenis, Barcelona, Spain
21–23 September 1967
Clay

Ecuador
0

			1	2	3	4	5
1	(Spain) (Ecuador)	Manuel Santana; Pancho Guzmán	6; 2	6; 1	6; 1
2	(Spain) (Ecuador)	Juan Gisbert; Miguel Olvera	3; 6	6; 3	6; 3	6; 2
3	(Spain) (Ecuador)	José Luis Arilla / Manuel Santana; Pancho Guzmán / Miguel Olvera	7; 5	6; 8	3; 6	9; 7	6; 1
4	(Spain) (Ecuador)	Manuel Santana; Miguel Olvera	6; 3	6; 4	6; 1
5	(Spain) (Ecuador)	Juan Gisbert; Pancho Guzmán	6; 3	2; 6	0; 6	6; 2	6; 1

=== Final ===
South Africa vs. Spain

South Africa
2
Ellis Park, Johannesburg, South Africa
30 November–4 December 1967
Hard

Spain
3

			1	2	3	4	5
1	(South Africa) (Spain)	Ray Moore; Manuel Santana	3; 6	2; 6	4; 6
2	(South Africa) (Spain)	Cliff Drysdale; Manuel Orantes	6; 4	6; 2	6; 4
3	(South Africa) (Spain)	Cliff Drysdale / Frew McMillan; José Luis Arilla / Manuel Santana	4; 6	3; 6	11; 13
4	(South Africa) (Spain)	Ray Moore; Manuel Orantes	6; 4	0; 6	6; 4	2; 6	6; 4
5	(South Africa) (Spain)	Cliff Drysdale; Manuel Santana	3; 6	3; 6	6; 3	2; 6

== Challenge Round ==
Australia vs. Spain

Australia
4
Milton Courts, Brisbane, Australia
26–28 December 1967
Grass

Spain
1

			1	2	3	4	5
1	(Australia) (Spain)	Roy Emerson; Manuel Santana	6; 4	6; 1	6; 1
2	(Australia) (Spain)	John Newcombe; Manuel Orantes	6; 3	6; 3	6; 2
3	(Australia) (Spain)	John Newcombe / Tony Roche; Manuel Orantes / Manuel Santana	6; 4	6; 4	6; 4
4	(Australia) (Spain)	John Newcombe; Manuel Santana	5; 7	4; 6	2; 6
5	(Australia) (Spain)	Roy Emerson; Manuel Orantes	6; 1	6; 1	2; 6	6; 4
