= Colin O'Brien (tennis) =

Irish tennis player

- Country (sports): Ireland
- Residence: Dublin, Ireland
- Born: 17 April 1984 (age 40); Dublin, Ireland
- Plays: Left-handed
- Prize money: $32,553

Singles
- Career record: 2-1
- Career titles: 0 ATP
- Highest ranking: No. 599 (9 May 2011)

Doubles
- Career record: 1-3
- Career titles: 0 ATP
- Highest ranking: 331 (30 August 2010)
- Last updated on: 28 November 2014.

Colin O'Brien (born 17 April 1984) is a former Irish professional tennis player. He was born in Dublin, Ireland.

== Career ==
O'Brien mainly played on the ITF Men's Circuit and also competed for the Ireland Davis Cup team where he held a 4–5 record. He retired at the end of the 2013 season.

== Singles titles ==
Legend (singles)
Grand Slam (0)
ATP World Tour Masters 1000 (0)
ATP World Tour 500 (0)
ATP World Tour 250 (0)
ATP Challenger Tour (0)
ITF Futures (0)

Wins (0)

Runner-up (3)

No.	Date	Tournament	Surface	Opponent	Score
1.	21 June 2008	Dublin, F1	Carpet	(Netherlands) Michel Koning	3–6, 5–7
2.	25 January 2009	Bergheim bei Salzburg 1, F1	Carpet	(Austria) Nicolas Reissig	3–6, 2–6
3.	6 November 2010	Heraklion, F4	Hard	(Greece) Alexandros Jakupovic	3–6, 3–6

== Doubles titles ==
Legend (doubles)
Grand Slam (0)
ATP World Tour Masters 1000 (0)
ATP World Tour 500 (0)
ATP World Tour 250 (0)
ATP Challenger Tour (0)
ITF Futures (9)

Wins (9)

No.	Date	Tournament	Surface	Partner	Opponent	Score
1.	2 May 2009	Bournemouth, F5	Clay	(United Kingdom) Daniel Smethurst	(United Kingdom) Ashley Hewitt (United Kingdom) Richard Gabb	6–3, 6–2
2.	16 May 2009	Newcastle, F7	Clay	(Republic of Ireland) James McGee	(United Kingdom) Nick Cavaday (Republic of Ireland) Barry King	6–4, 6–4
3.	18 July 2009	Frinton, F9	Grass	(Republic of Ireland) Tristan Farron-Mahon	(United Kingdom) Neil Pauffley (United Kingdom) Marcus Willis	6–7^{(5)}, 7–6^{(3)}, [10–6]
4.	11 October 2009	Paros 2, F3	Carpet	(Switzerland) Mathieu Guenat	(Greece) Paris Gemouchidis (Greece) Manolis Glezos	6–7^{(1)}, 6–3, [10–3]
5.	9 May 2010	Edinburgh, F6	Clay	(Republic of Ireland) James Cluskey	(Republic of Ireland) Barry King (United Kingdom) Marcus Willis	6–3, 6–3
6.	24 July 2010	Dublin, F1	Carpet	(Republic of Ireland) James Cluskey	(Australia) Colin Ebelthite (Republic of Ireland) Barry King	6–2, 7–6^{(1)}
7.	21 August 2010	Jūrmala, F1	Clay	(Republic of Ireland) James Cluskey	(Czech Republic) Jakub Lustyk (Czech Republic) David Novak	2–6, 6–3, [14–12]
8.	17 March 2013	Guimarães, F4	Hard	(Republic of Ireland) Sam Barry	(Portugal) Goncalo Pereira (Portugal) Danyal Sualehe	6–1, 6–1
9.	27 July 2013	Dublin, F1	Carpet	(Republic of Ireland) John Morrissey	(New Zealand) Marcus Daniell (United Kingdom) Richard Gabb	6–4, 6–7^{(1)}, [10–7]

Runner-up (15)

No.	Date	Tournament	Surface	Partner	Opponent	Score
1.	23 June 2007	Dublin, F1	Carpet	(Republic of Ireland) Barry King	(Canada) Pierre-Ludovic Duclos (Australia) Raphael Durek	5–7, 6–7^{(2)}
2.	25 May 2008	Jablonec nad Nisou, F3	Clay	(United States) James Ludlow	(Canada) Érik Chvojka (Czech Republic) Jaroslav Pospíšil	4–6, 3–6
3.	14 September 2008	Nottingham, F14	Hard	(United Kingdom) Colin Fleming	(France) Jérémy Blandin (Austria) Martin Fischer	0–6, 6–2, [9–11]
4.	28 September 2008	Paros, F5	Carpet	(United Kingdom) Colin Fleming	(Germany) Dennis Blömke (Germany) Dimitris Kleftakos	4–6, 3–6
5.	28 August 2009	Piombino, F25	Hard	(France) Philippe De Bonnevie	(Italy) Alessandro Giannessi (Italy) Claudio Grassi	1–6, 6–4, [5–10]
6.	12 September 2009	Wrexham, F13	Hard	(South Africa) Andrew Anderson	(United Kingdom) Chris Eaton (United Kingdom) Dominic Inglot	6–3, 3–6, [6–10]
7.	27 September 2009	Kos, F1	Hard	(Switzerland) Mathieu Guenat	(Italy) Damiano di Ienno (Italy) Claudio Grassi	4–6, 6–7^{(5)}
8.	18 October 2009	Heraklion, F4	Carpet	(Switzerland) Mathieu Guenat	(Switzerland) Alexander Sadecky (Russia) Mikhail Vasiliev	6–7^{(2)}, 6–7^{(4)}
9.	28 November 2009	Kuala Lumpur, F5	Hard	(India) Rohan Gajjar	(Belarus) Siarhei Betau (Belarus) Dzmitry Zhyrmont	4–6, 3–6
10.	27 February 2010	Sarajevo, F2	Carpet	(Republic of Ireland) James McGee	(United Kingdom) Chris Eaton (United Kingdom) Dominic Inglot	W/O
11.	18 June 2010	Kelibia, F3	Hard	(Republic of Ireland) James Cluskey	(France) Laurent Rochette (Russia) Mikhail Vasiliev	3–6, 6–1, [6–10]
12.	31 October 2010	Heraklion, F3	Carpet	(Republic of Ireland) Sam Barry	(Republic of Ireland) Daniel Glancy (United Kingdom) Marcus Willis	5–7, 7–5 [8–10]
13.	25 January 2013	Sheffield, F2	Hard	(Republic of Ireland) Sam Barry	(United Kingdom) Ken Skupski (United Kingdom) Neal Skupski	6–3, 3–6, [5–10]
14.	3 March 2013	Loulé, F2	Hard	(Republic of Ireland) Sam Barry	(Spain) Ivan Arenas-Gualda (Spain) Enrique Lopez-Perez	7–6^{(2)}, 6–7^{(5)}, [4–10]
15.	22 September 2013	Plaisir, F16	Hard	(South Africa) Dean O'Brien	(France) Remi Boutillier (France) Julien Obry	6–3, 6–7^{(4)}, [14–16]
