= Tennis at the 1974 Asian Games – Men's team =

Men's team at the 1974 Asian Games
- Venue: Imperial Country Club
- Dates: 2–11 September 1974
- Nations: 12

Medalists
| gold medal | Japan; Kenichi Hirai, Ryoichi Mori, Toshiro Sakai, Natsuta Uehara |
| silver medal | China; Gao Hongyun, Lü Zhengyi, Wang Fuzhang, Xu Meilin |
| bronze medal | Pakistan; Munawar Iqbal, Ismail Majid, Saeed Meer, Meer Muhammad |

Men's team
- Tennis at the 1974 Asian Games

Events
| Singles | men | women |
| Doubles | men | women | mixed |
| Team | men | women |
- Asian Games

The men's team tennis event was part of the tennis programme and took place between 2 and 11 September, at the Imperial Country Club.

== Results ==
=== Preliminary round ===
==== Group A ====
| Pos | Team | Pld | W | L | MF | MA | Qualification |
|---|---|---|---|---|---|---|---|
| 1 | Japan | 5 | 5 | 0 | 14 | 1 | Semifinals |
| 2 | Pakistan | 5 | 4 | 1 | 12 | 3 | Semifinals |
| 3 | South Vietnam | 5 | 3 | 2 | 7 | 8 | |
| 4 | Philippines | 5 | 2 | 3 | 7 | 8 | |
| 5 | Israel | 5 | 1 | 4 | 3 | 12 | |
| 6 | Laos | 5 | 0 | 5 | 2 | 13 | |

| 2 September | Japan | 3–0 | South Vietnam |

Toshiro Sakai | 2–0 | Võ Văn Bảy | 6–0, 6–3
Kenichi Hirai | 2–0 | Võ Văn Thành | 6–1, 6–0
Ryoichi Mori / Natsuta Uehara | 2–1 | Võ Văn Bảy / Tạ Duy Báu | 6–4, 3–6, 6–1

| 2 September | Pakistan | 2–1 | Philippines |

Saeed Meer | 2–1 | Alexander Marcial | 4–6, 7–5, 6–0
Meer Muhammad | 2–1 | Ramon Funtera | 7–5, 2–6, 6–4
Saeed Meer / Meer Muhammad | 0–2 | Alexander Marcial / Rene Abastillas | Walkover

| 2 September | Israel | 2–1 | Laos |

Yehoshua Shalem | 2–1 | Vanh Chanthara | 7–6, 6–7, 6–3
Yair Wertheimer | 2–0 | Bounlu Philavong | 6–2, 6–2
Yehoshua Shalem / Yair Wertheimer | 0–2 | Vanh Chanthara / Chantharasy | 4–6, 3–6

| 2 September | Japan | 2–1 | Pakistan |

Toshiro Sakai | 0–2 | Saeed Meer | 4–6, 4–6
Kenichi Hirai | 2–0 | Meer Muhammad | 7–6, 6–4
Toshiro Sakai / Kenichi Hirai | 2–0 | Saeed Meer / Meer Muhammad | 7–5, 6–1

| 2 September | Philippines | 2–1 | Israel |

Romeo Rafon | 1–2 | Yehoshua Shalem | 6–3, 4–6, 1–6
Alexander Marcial | 2–0 | Yair Wertheimer | 6–3, 6–2
Alexander Marcial / Rene Abastillas | 2–0 | Yehoshua Shalem / Yair Wertheimer | 7–5, 6–2

| 2 September | Laos | 1–2 | South Vietnam |

Vanh Chanthara | 2–0 | Võ Văn Bảy | 6–3, 6–1
Bounlu Philavong | 1–2 | Võ Văn Thành | 7–5, 4–6, 4–6
Vanh Chanthara / Chantharasy | 1–2 | Võ Văn Bảy / Tạ Duy Báu | 6–3, 2–6, 4–6

| 3 September | Japan | 3–0 | Laos |

Toshiro Sakai | 2–0 | Vanh Chanthara | 6–1, 6–0
Kenichi Hirai | 2–0 | Bounlu Philavong | 6–3, 6–1
Ryoichi Mori / Natsuta Uehara | 2–0 | Vanh Chanthara / Chantharasy | 6–3, 7–5

| 3 September | Philippines | 1–2 | South Vietnam |

Ramon Funtera | 0–2 | Võ Văn Bảy | 3–6, 4–6
Alexander Marcial | 2–0 | Võ Văn Thành | 6–2, 6–4
Alexander Marcial / Rene Abastillas | 1–2 | Tạ Duy Báu / Võ Văn Bảy | 6–4, 4–6, 3–6

| 3 September | Israel | 0–3 | Pakistan |

Yehoshua Shalem | 0–2 | Saeed Meer | 2–6, 3–6
Yair Wertheimer | 0–2 | Meer Muhammad | 5–7, 3–6
Yehoshua Shalem / Yair Wertheimer | 0–2 | Saeed Meer / Meer Muhammad | Walkover

| 3 September | Japan | 3–0 | Israel |

Toshiro Sakai | 2–0 | Yehoshua Shalem | 6–2, 6–0
Kenichi Hirai | 2–1 | Yair Wertheimer | 6–7, 6–4, 6–1
Toshiro Sakai / Kenichi Hirai | 2–0 | Yehoshua Shalem / Yair Wertheimer | Walkover

| 3 September | Philippines | 3–0 | Laos |

Romeo Rafon | 2–0 | Bounlu Philavong | 6–3, 6–3
Rene Abastillas | 2–0 | Soukanh Syvoravong | 6–0, 6–0
Romeo Rafon / Rene Abastillas | 2–1 | Bounlu Philavong / Soukanh Syvoravong | 7–5, 3–6, 8–6

| 3 September | Pakistan | 3–0 | South Vietnam |

Saeed Meer | 2–0 | Võ Văn Bảy | 6–2, 6–4
Meer Muhammad | 2–0 | Võ Văn Thành | 6–1, 6–3
Ismail Majid / Meer Muhammad | 2–0 | Võ Văn Bảy / Tạ Duy Báu | Walkover

| 4 September | Japan | 3–0 | Philippines |

Toshiro Sakai | 2–0 | Ramon Funtera | 6–1, 6–1
Kenichi Hirai | 2–1 | Alexander Marcial | 0–6, 7–5, 7–5
Ryoichi Mori / Natsuta Uehara | 2–0 | Alexander Marcial / Rene Abastillas | 7–6, 6–3

| 4 September | Israel | 0–3 | South Vietnam |

Yehoshua Shalem | 0–2 | Võ Văn Bảy | 6–7, 2–6
Yair Wertheimer | 1–2 | Võ Văn Thành | 6–3, 6–7, 5–7
Yehoshua Shalem / Yair Wertheimer | 0–2 | Võ Văn Bảy / Tạ Duy Báu | Walkover

| 4 September | Laos | 0–3 | Pakistan |

Chantharasy | 0–2 | Saeed Meer | 1–6, 4–6
Soukanh Syvoravong | 0–2 | Meer Muhammad | 2–6, 1–6
Chantharasy / Soukanh Syvoravong | 0–2 | Saeed Meer / Meer Muhammad | Walkover

==== Group B ====
| Pos | Team | Pld | W | L | MF | MA | Qualification |
|---|---|---|---|---|---|---|---|
| 1 | China | 5 | 4 | 1 | 12 | 3 | Semifinals |
| 2 | Iran | 5 | 4 | 1 | 12 | 3 | Semifinals |
| 3 | India | 5 | 3 | 2 | 10 | 5 | |
| 4 | Thailand | 5 | 3 | 2 | 8 | 7 | |
| 5 | Iraq | 5 | 1 | 4 | 3 | 12 | |
| 6 | Kuwait | 5 | 0 | 5 | 0 | 15 | |

| 2 September | Thailand | 0–3 | China |

| 2 September | Iran | 2–1 | India |

Taghi Akbari | 2–0 | Chiradip Mukerjea | 6–4, 6–1
Hossein Akbari | 2–1 | Bidyut Goswami | 2–6, 6–4, 7–5
Kambiz Derafshijavan / Ali Madani | 0–2 | Chiradip Mukerjea / Bidyut Goswami | 5–7, 4–6

| 2 September | Kuwait | 0–3 | Iraq |

F. Al-Qatami | 0–2 | Hussein Kadhim | 0–6, 0–6
Adel Al-Ghanim | 0–2 | Abbas Ali | 0–6, 1–6
F. Al-Qatami / Adel Al-Ghanim | 0–2 | Hussein Kadhim / Abbas Ali | 2–6, 0–6

| 2 September | Thailand | 2–1 | India |

| 2 September | Iran | 3–0 | Kuwait |

Hossein Akbari | 2–0 | Adel Al-Ghanim | 6–2, 6–0
Ali Madani | 2–0 | Mohammad Al-Zabalawi | 6–1, 6–1
Ali Madani / Kambiz Derafshijavan | 2–0 | Adel Al-Ghanim / Mohammad Al-Zabalawi | Walkover

| 2 September | Iraq | 0–3 | China |

Hussein Kadhim | 0–2 | Lü Zhengyi | 1–6, 3–6
Abbas Ali | 0–2 | Gao Hongyun | 0–6, 0–6
Hussein Kadhim / Abbas Ali | 0–2 | Wang Fuzhang / Gao Hongyun | 0–6, 2–6

| 3 September | Thailand | 3–0 | Iraq |

Somparn Champisri | 2–0 | Abbas Ali | 6–0, 6–0
Pichet Boratisa | 2–0 | Hussein Kadhim | 7–6, 6–1
Somparn Champisri / Chana Techasen | 2–0 | Abbas Ali / Hussein Kadhim | 6–3, 6–2

| 3 September | Iran | 1–2 | China |

Taghi Akbari | 1–2 | Lü Zhengyi | 1–6, 6–1, 2–6
Hossein Akbari | 0–2 | Gao Hongyun | 2–6, 1–6
Ali Madani / Kambiz Derafshijavan | 2–1 | Wang Fuzhang / Gao Hongyun | 6–3, 2–6, 6–2

| 3 September | Kuwait | 0–3 | India |

Adel Al-Ghanim | 0–2 | Chiradip Mukerjea | 3–6, 0–6
Mohammad Al-Zabalawi | 0–2 | Bidyut Goswami | 1–6, 1–6
Adel Al-Ghanim / Mohammad Al-Zabalawi | 0–2 | Chiradip Mukerjea / Bidyut Goswami | Walkover

| 3 September | Thailand | 3–0 | Kuwait |

| 3 September | Iran | 3–0 | Iraq |

Ali Madani | 2–0 | Abbas Ali | 6–3, 6–4
Kambiz Derafshijavan | 2–0 | Hussein Kadhim | Walkover
Ali Madani / Kambiz Derafshijavan | 2–0 | Abbas Ali / Hussein Kadhim | Walkover

| 3 September | India | 2–1 | China |

Chiradip Mukerjea | 1–2 | Lü Zhengyi | 6–7, 6–4, 2–6
Bidyut Goswami | 2–1 | Wang Fuzhang | 3–6, 6–1, 6–1
Chiradip Mukerjea / Bidyut Goswami | 2–0 | Wang Fuzhang / Gao Hongyun | 6–4, 7–6

| 4 September | Iran | 3–0 | Thailand |

Taghi Akbari | 2–0 | Somparn Champisri | 6–2, 6–1
Hossein Akbari | 2–0 | Pichet Boratisa | 7–6, 6–2
Ali Madani / Kambiz Derafshijavan | 2–0 | Pongsopitsin / Chana Techasen | 6–1, 6–3

| 4 September | Kuwait | 0–3 | China |

Adel Al-Ghanim | 0–2 | Wang Fuzhang | 0–6, 1–6
Mohammad Al-Zabalawi | 0–2 | Gao Hongyun | 1–6, 1–6
Mohammad Al-Zabalawi / Abdulaziz | 0–2 | Wang Fuzhang / Gao Hongyun | 0–6, 1–6

| 4 September | Iraq | 0–3 | India |

Hussein Kadhim | 0–2 | Chiradip Mukerjea | 2–6, 2–6
Abbas Ali | 0–2 | Bidyut Goswami | Walkover
Hussein Kadhim / Abbas Ali | 0–2 | Chiradip Mukerjea / Bidyut Goswami | Walkover

=== Knockout round ===
Semifinals
A1 | Japan | 2
B2 | Iran | 1
B1 | China | 2
A2 | Pakistan | 1

Final
A1 | Japan | 3
B1 | China | 0
Bronze medal match
B2 | Iran | 1
A2 | Pakistan | 2

==== Semifinals ====
| 4 September | Japan | 2–1 | Iran |

Toshiro Sakai | 2–0 | Taghi Akbari | 6–2, 6–3
Kenichi Hirai | 2–1 | Hossein Akbari | 6–1, 5–7, 6–2
Ryoichi Mori / Natsuta Uehara | 1–2 | Ali Madani / Kambiz Derafshijavan | 6–3, 3–6, 2–6

| 4 September | China | 2–1 | Pakistan |

Lü Zhengyi | 1–2 | Saeed Meer | 7–6, 4–6, 3–6
Gao Hongyun | 2–1 | Meer Muhammad | 6–3, 5–7, 6–3
Lü Zhengyi / Gao Hongyun | 2–0 | Saeed Meer / Meer Muhammad | 7–5, 6–0

==== Bronze medal match ====
| 11 September | Iran | 1–2 | Pakistan |

Taghi Akbari | 1–2 | Saeed Meer | 2–6, 6–2, 3–6
Hossein Akbari | 0–2 | Meer Muhammad | 2–6, 2–6
Ali Madani / Kambiz Derafshijavan | 2–0 | Meer Muhammad / Ismail Majid | 6–2, 6–3

==== Final ====
| 11 September | Japan | 3–0 | China |

Toshiro Sakai | 2–0 | Xu Meilin | 6–2, 6–1
Kenichi Hirai | 2–1 | Lü Zhengyi | 4–6, 6–1, 6–2
Toshiro Sakai / Kenichi Hirai | 2–1 | Lü Zhengyi / Gao Hongyun | 6–2, 4–6, 7–5
