= Tennis at the 1974 Asian Games – Men's singles =

Men's singles at the 1974 Asian Games
- Venue: Imperial Country Club
- Dates: 5–13 September 1974
- Competitors: 24 from 13 nations

Medalists
gold medal	Toshiro Sakai	Japan
silver medal	Taghi Akbari	Iran
bronze medal	Yehoshua Shalem	Israel

Men's singles
- Tennis at the 1974 Asian Games

Events
Singles	men	women
Doubles	men	women	mixed
Team	men	women
- Asian Games

The men's singles tennis event was part of the tennis programme and took place between 5 and 13 September, at the Imperial Country Club.

== Results ==
Legend

- WO — Won by walkover

=== Finals ===
Final
Toshiro Sakai (JPN)	3	6	6	7
Taghi Akbari (IRN)	6	4	0	5

Bronze medal match
Yehoshua Shalem (ISR)	W	O
Lü Zhengyi (CHN)

=== Top half ===
1st round
Vanh Chanthara (LAO)	W	O
F. Al-Qatami (KUW)
Võ Văn Bảy (VNM)	6	1	6
Pichet Boratisa (THA)	4	6	3
Yehoshua Shalem (ISR)	W	O
Adel Al-Ghanim (KUW)
Hussein Kadhim (IRQ)	2	1
Hossein Akbari (IRN)	6	6
Yair Wertheimer (ISR)	6	4	1
Bidyut Goswami (IND)	1	6	6

2nd round
Toshiro Sakai (JPN)	W	O
Abbas Ali (IRQ)
Alexander Marcial (PHI)	6	6
Vanh Chanthara (LAO)	0	1
Võ Văn Bảy (VNM)	3	1
Yehoshua Shalem (ISR)	6	6
Hossein Akbari (IRN)	6	6	6
Bidyut Goswami (IND)	7	1	3

Quarterfinals
Toshiro Sakai (JPN)	6	6
Alexander Marcial (PHI)	1	1
Yehoshua Shalem (ISR)
Hossein Akbari (IRN)

Semifinals
Toshiro Sakai (JPN)	6	6
Yehoshua Shalem (ISR)	1	0

=== Bottom half ===
1st round
Lü Zhengyi (CHN)	6	6
Ismail Majid (PAK)	0	2
Singha Bahadur Basnyat (NEP)	0	2
Somparn Champisri (THA)	6	6
Saeed Meer (PAK)	6	6
Võ Văn Thành (VNM)	0	2

2nd round
Lü Zhengyi (CHN)	6	6
Somparn Champisri (THA)	3	4
Saeed Meer (PAK)	6	6	3
Romeo Rafon (PHI)	3	7	6
Taghi Akbari (IRN)	6	6
Bounlu Philavong (LAO)	1	4
Xu Meilin (CHN)	4	4
Kenichi Hirai (JPN)	6	6

Quarterfinals
Lü Zhengyi (CHN)	6	6
Romeo Rafon (PHI)	1	3
Taghi Akbari (IRN)
Kenichi Hirai (JPN)

Semifinals
Lü Zhengyi (CHN)	2	6	5
Taghi Akbari (IRN)	6	2	7
