= 1976 Davis Cup Europe Zone =

International tennis competition

The Europe Zone was one of the three regional zones of the 1976 Davis Cup.

32 teams entered the Europe Zone, competing across 2 sub-zones, Zone A and Zone B. 7 teams entered the competition in the pre-qualifying rounds, competing for 3 spots in the preliminary rounds. The 3 winners in the pre-qualifying rounds joined an additional 21 teams in the preliminary rounds, with 12 teams in each sub-zone competing for 4 places in the main draw, to join the 4 finalists from the 1975 Europe Zone.

The winners of each sub-zone's main draw went on to compete in the Inter-Zonal Zone against the winners of the Americas Zone and Eastern Zone.

The Soviet Union defeated Hungary in the Zone A final, and Italy defeated Great Britain in the Zone B final, resulting in both the Soviet Union and Italy progressing to the Inter-Zonal Zone.

== Zone A ==
=== Pre-qualifying round ===
==== Draw ====
Pre-qualifying round
Turkey
Israel	w/o

=== Preliminary rounds ===
==== Draw ====
First Round
Copenhagen, Denmark (indoor carpet)
Finland	1
Denmark	4
bye
West Germany
Monte Carlo, Monaco
Monaco	4
Israel	1
bye
Soviet Union
Brussels, Belgium
Belgium	4
Netherlands	1
bye
Hungary
Ireland	w/o
Rhodesia
bye
Egypt

Qualifying Round
Freiburg, West Germany (clay)
Denmark	0
West Germany	5
Tbilisi, Soviet Union
Monaco	0
Soviet Union	5
Brussels, Belgium
Belgium	0
Hungary	5
Cairo, Egypt
Ireland	1
Egypt	4

==== First round ====
Denmark vs. Finland

Denmark
4
Copenhagen, Denmark
26–28 September 1975
Carpet (indoors)

Finland
1

			1	2	3	4	5
1	(Denmark) (Finland)	Tom Christensen; Matti Timonen	6; 1	8; 6	7; 5
2	(Denmark) (Finland)	Lars Elvstrøm; George Berner	6; 4	7; 5	13; 11
3	(Denmark) (Finland)	Tom Christensen / Lars Elvstrøm; Mikko Horsma / Matti Timonen	2; 6	9; 7	6; 2	6; 2
4	(Denmark) (Finland)	Lars Elvstrøm; Matti Timonen	1; 6	3; 6	1; 6
5	(Denmark) (Finland)	Tom Christensen; George Berner	6; 3	6; 2	1; 6	3; 6	6; 4

Monaco vs. Israel

Monaco
4
Monte Carlo, Monaco
2–4 October 1975

Israel
1

			1	2	3	4	5
1	(Monaco) (Israel)	Bernard Balleret; Yehoshua Shalem	6; 0	6; 3	6; 1
2	(Monaco) (Israel)	Louis Borfiga; Yair Wertheimer	6; 2	5; 7	6; 3	6; 1
3	(Monaco) (Israel)	Louis Borfiga / Emmanuel van der Pol; Josef Stabholz / Yair Wertheimer	3; 6	6; 3	2; 6	4; 6
4	(Monaco) (Israel)	Bernard Balleret; Yair Wertheimer	6; 3	6; 4	6; 4
5	(Monaco) (Israel)	Louis Borfiga; Yehoshua Shalem	6; 2	6; 0	6; 3

Belgium vs. Netherlands

Belgium
4
Brussels, Belgium
26–28 September 1975

Netherlands
1

			1	2	3	4	5
1	(Belgium) (Netherlands)	Patrick Hombergen; Louk Sanders	6; 4	3; 6	6; 4	6; 4
2	(Belgium) (Netherlands)	Bernard Mignot; Tom Okker	6; 3	6; 3	12; 14	6; 4
3	(Belgium) (Netherlands)	Patrick Hombergen / Bernard Mignot; Niklaus Fleury / Louk Sanders	6; 2	4; 6	6; 4	6; 4
4	(Belgium) (Netherlands)	Patrick Hombergen; Fred Hemmes	6; 4	8; 6	6; 3
5	(Belgium) (Netherlands)	Bernard Mignot; Louk Sanders	3; 6	5; 7	6; 3	3; 6

==== Qualifying Draw ====
West Germany vs. Denmark

West Germany
5
Freiburg, West Germany
30 April–2 May 1976
Clay

Denmark
0

			1	2	3	4	5
1	(West Germany) (Denmark)	Hans-Jürgen Pohmann; Carl-Edvard Hedelund	6; 2	6; 2	6; 3
2	(West Germany) (Denmark)	Ulrich Pinner; Kasper Rud	6; 2	6; 0	6; 1
3	(West Germany) (Denmark)	Jürgen Fassbender / Hans-Jürgen Pohmann; Carsten Gregers / Carl-Edvard Hedelund	6; 2	7; 5	6; 4
4	(West Germany) (Denmark)	Hans-Jürgen Pohmann; Kasper Rud	6; 2	6; 1	6; 2
5	(West Germany) (Denmark)	Ulrich Pinner; Carl-Edvard Hedelund	7; 5	6; 0	6; 0

Soviet Union vs. Monaco

Soviet Union
5
Tbilisi, Soviet Union
30 April–2 May 1976

Monaco
0

			1	2	3	4	5
1	(Soviet Union) (Monaco)	Teimuraz Kakulia; Louis Borfiga	7; 5	6; 3	6; 4
2	(Soviet Union) (Monaco)	Vadim Borisov; Bernard Balleret	7; 5	6; 2	10; 8
3	(Soviet Union) (Monaco)	Teimuraz Kakulia / Konstantin Pugaev; Bernard Balleret / Louis Borfiga	5; 7	6; 3	6; 3	6; 3
4	(Soviet Union) (Monaco)	Konstantin Pugaev; Emmanuel van der Pol	6; 0	6; 2	6; 2
5	(Soviet Union) (Monaco)	Vadim Borisov; Louis Borfiga	6; 4	9; 7	7; 5

Belgium vs. Hungary

Belgium
0
Brussels, Belgium
30 April–2 May 1976

Hungary
5

			1	2	3	4	5
1	(Belgium) (Hungary)	Patrick Hombergen; Balázs Taróczy	4; 6	1; 6	1; 6
2	(Belgium) (Hungary)	Bernard Mignot; Péter Szőke	1; 6	6; 8	7; 9
3	(Belgium) (Hungary)	Patrick Hombergen / Bernard Mignot; Péter Szőke / Balázs Taróczy	2; 6	8; 6	4; 6	6; 2	3; 6
4	(Belgium) (Hungary)	Bernard Mignot; Balázs Taróczy	2; 6	7; 9	6; 4	6; 2	3; 6
5	(Belgium) (Hungary)	Patrick Hombergen; Péter Szőke	8; 10	2; 6	3; 6

Egypt vs. Ireland

Egypt
4
Cairo, Egypt
1–4 January 1976

Ireland
1

			1	2	3	4	5
1	(Egypt) (Republic of Ireland)	Abdel-Ghani Mohammed; Michael Hickey	6; 2	6; 2	6; 3
2	(Egypt) (Republic of Ireland)	Abdel-Gawad Mohammed; James McArdle	6; 3	6; 2	6; 2
3	(Egypt) (Republic of Ireland)	Abdel-Ghani Mohammed / Shukry Moubarek; Michael Hickey / Sean Sorensen	6; 2	7; 5	6; 3
4	(Egypt) (Republic of Ireland)	Abdel-Gawad Mohammed; Michael Hickey	6; 2	6; 4	4; 6	4; 6	6; 8
5	(Egypt) (Republic of Ireland)	Abdel-Ghani Mohammed; Kevin Menton	8; 6	6; 3	1; 6	6; 0

=== Main draw ===
==== Draw ====
Quarterfinals; 14–16 May
Spain
bye
Bad Homburg, West Germany
West Germany	1
Soviet Union	4
Budapest, Hungary
Hungary	5
Egypt	0
bye
Czechoslovakia

Semifinals; 23–25 July
Donetsk, Soviet Union
Spain	1
Soviet Union	4
Budapest, Hungary (clay)
Hungary	3
Czechoslovakia	1

Final; 13–15 August
Tbilisi, Soviet Union
Soviet Union	4
Hungary	1

==== Quarterfinals ====
West Germany vs. Soviet Union

West Germany
1
Bad Homburg, West Germany
14–16 May 1976

Soviet Union
4

			1	2	3	4	5
1	(West Germany) (Soviet Union)	Ulrich Pinner; Alex Metreveli	10; 8	3; 6	4; 6	2; 6
2	(West Germany) (Soviet Union)	Karl Meiler; Teimuraz Kakulia	6; 0	6; 2	1; 1			retired
3	(West Germany) (Soviet Union)	Jürgen Fassbender / Hans-Jürgen Pohmann; Teimuraz Kakulia / Alex Metreveli	6; 4	1; 6	7; 5	7; 9	4; 6
4	(West Germany) (Soviet Union)	Ulrich Pinner; Teimuraz Kakulia	6; 4	7; 5	7; 5
5	(West Germany) (Soviet Union)	Jürgen Fassbender; Alex Metreveli	3; 6	6; 3	1; 6	3; 6

Hungary vs. Egypt

Hungary
5
Budapest, Hungary
14–16 May 1976

Egypt
0

			1	2	3	4	5
1	(Hungary) (Egypt)	Péter Szőke; Abdel-Ghani Mohammed	6; 2	6; 4	6; 0
2	(Hungary) (Egypt)	Balázs Taróczy; Ismail El Shafei	4; 6	6; 3	6; 1	6; 1
3	(Hungary) (Egypt)	Péter Szőke / Balázs Taróczy; Ismail El Shafei / Abdel-Ghani Mohammed	6; 0	6; 1	6; 2
4	(Hungary) (Egypt)	Péter Szőke; Ismail El Shafei	6; 1	6; 8	6; 2	6; 4
5	(Hungary) (Egypt)	Balázs Taróczy; Abdel-Ghani Mohammed	6; 2	6; 1	6; 4

==== Semifinals ====
Soviet Union vs. Spain

Soviet Union
4
Donetsk, Soviet Union
23–25 July 1976

Spain
1

			1	2	3	4	5
1	(Soviet Union) (Spain)	Alex Metreveli; Manuel Orantes	6; 4	2; 6	6; 4	6; 4
2	(Soviet Union) (Spain)	Teimuraz Kakulia; Antonio Muñoz	6; 2	6; 1	6; 3
3	(Soviet Union) (Spain)	Teimuraz Kakulia / Alex Metreveli; Juan Gisbert / Manuel Orantes	1; 6	6; 8	3; 6
4	(Soviet Union) (Spain)	Alex Metreveli; Antonio Muñoz	6; 3	6; 3	4; 6	6; 4
5	(Soviet Union) (Spain)	Teimuraz Kakulia; Ángel Giménez	6; 2	6; 4

Hungary vs. Czechoslovakia

Hungary
3
Budapest, Hungary
23–25 July 1976
Clay

Czechoslovakia
1

			1	2	3	4	5
1	(Hungary) (Czechoslovakia)	Balázs Taróczy; Jan Kodeš	6; 3	6; 0	6; 3
2	(Hungary) (Czechoslovakia)	Péter Szőke; Jiří Hřebec	2; 6	3; 6	3; 6
3	(Hungary) (Czechoslovakia)	Péter Szőke / Balázs Taróczy; Jiří Hřebec / Jan Kodeš	6; 3	6; 4	2; 6	3; 6	6; 4
4	(Hungary) (Czechoslovakia)	Balázs Taróczy; Jiří Hřebec	6; 3	6; 3	6; 2
5	(Hungary) (Czechoslovakia)	Péter Szőke; Jan Kodeš	6; 4	3; 6	6; 3	3; 6		not completed

==== Final ====
Soviet Union vs. Hungary

Soviet Union
4
Tbilisi, Soviet Union
13–15 August 1976

Hungary
1

			1	2	3	4	5
1	(Soviet Union) (Hungary)	Alex Metreveli; János Benyik	6; 3	7; 5	6; 3
2	(Soviet Union) (Hungary)	Teimuraz Kakulia; Balázs Taróczy	3; 6	3; 6	4; 6
3	(Soviet Union) (Hungary)	Teimuraz Kakulia / Alex Metreveli; Péter Szőke / Balázs Taróczy	12; 10	6; 0	6; 4
4	(Soviet Union) (Hungary)	Alex Metreveli; Balázs Taróczy	7; 5	6; 1	9; 7
5	(Soviet Union) (Hungary)	Teimuraz Kakulia; János Benyik	6; 4	6; 8	3; 6	6; 3	6; 1

== Zone B ==
=== Pre-qualifying rounds ===
==== Draw ====
First Round
Iran
bye
Nigeria	w/o
Algeria
bye
Luxembourg
bye
Portugal

Qualifying Round
Iran	w/o
Nigeria
Mondorf-les-Bains, Luxembourg (clay)
Luxembourg	0
Portugal	5

==== Qualifying round ====
Luxembourg vs. Portugal

Luxembourg
0
Mondorf-les-Bains, Luxembourg
22–24 August 1975
Clay

Portugal
5

			1	2	3	4	5
1	(Luxembourg) (Portugal)	Alphonse Neu; José Vilela	1; 6	4; 6	1; 6
2	(Luxembourg) (Portugal)	Théo Storck; João Lagos	2; 6	1; 6	5; 7
3	(Luxembourg) (Portugal)	Jean Brucher / Fernand Claude; Alfredo Vaz Pinto / José Vilela	4; 6	7; 9	0; 6
4	(Luxembourg) (Portugal)	Théo Storck; José Vilela	1; 6	2; 6	3; 6
5	(Luxembourg) (Portugal)	Alphonse Neu; João Lagos	0; 6	3; 6	1; 6

=== Preliminary rounds ===
==== Draw ====
First Round
Tehran, Iran
Iran	2
Switzerland	3
bye
Great Britain
Sofia, Bulgaria
Bulgaria	1
Austria	4
bye
Romania
Italy
bye
Warsaw, Poland (clay)
Poland	5
Norway	0
bye
Yugoslavia
Athens, Greece (clay)
Greece	4
Portugal	1

Qualifying Round
Zürich, Switzerland (clay)
Switzerland	1
Great Britain	4
Vienna, Austria
Austria	1
Romania	4
Florence, Italy (clay)
Italy	5
Poland	0
Zagreb, Yugoslavia
Yugoslavia	5
Greece	0

==== First round ====
Iran vs. Switzerland

Iran
2
Tehran, Iran
10–12 October 1975

Switzerland
3

			1	2	3	4	5
1	(Iran) (Switzerland)	Taghi Akbari; Petr Kanderal	2; 6	4; 6	5; 7
2	(Iran) (Switzerland)	Kamyab Derafshijavan; Heinz Günthardt	6; 4	7; 5	3; 6	6; 8	6; 3
3	(Iran) (Switzerland)	Kamyab Derafshijavan / Ali Madani; Petr Kanderal / Matthias Werren	4; 6	1; 6	4; 6
4	(Iran) (Switzerland)	Kamyab Derafshijavan; Petr Kanderal	2; 6	2; 6	4; 6
5	(Iran) (Switzerland)	Taghi Akbari; Heinz Günthardt	6; 1	2; 6	6; 4	6; 3

Bulgaria vs. Austria

Bulgaria
1
Sofia, Bulgaria
26–28 September 1975

Austria
4

			1	2	3	4	5
1	(Bulgaria) (Austria)	Bozhidar Pampoulov; Peter Feigl	6; 3	6; 2	4; 6	1; 6	2; 6
2	(Bulgaria) (Austria)	Ljuben Genov; Hans Kary	6; 3	1; 6	1; 6	3; 6
3	(Bulgaria) (Austria)	Bozhidar Pampoulov / Matei Pampoulov; Peter Feigl / Hans Kary	4; 6	4; 6	10; 8	5; 7
4	(Bulgaria) (Austria)	Lyubomir Petrov; Hans Kary	4; 6	0; 6	0; 6
5	(Bulgaria) (Austria)	Ljuben Genov; Peter Feigl	6; 1	10; 8	6; 3

Poland vs. Norway

Poland
5
Warsaw, Poland
12–14 September 1975
Clay

Norway
0

			1	2	3	4	5
1	(Poland) (Norway)	Wojciech Fibak; Per Hegna	2; 6	6; 4	6; 0	6; 0
2	(Poland) (Norway)	Jacek Niedźwiedzki; Erik Ulleberg	6; 8	6; 3	7; 5	6; 2
3	(Poland) (Norway)	Wojciech Fibak / Tadeusz Nowicki; Per Hegna / Erik Ulleberg	6; 0	7; 5	6; 0
4	(Poland) (Norway)	Wojciech Fibak; Erik Ulleberg	6; 1	6; 2	6; 0
5	(Poland) (Norway)	Jacek Niedźwiedzki; Per Hegna	6; 3	5; 7	6; 4	6; 2

Greece vs. Portugal

Greece
4
Athens, Greece
5–7 September 1975
Clay

Portugal
1

			1	2	3	4	5
1	(Greece) (Portugal)	Nicholas Kalogeropoulos; José Vilela	6; 3	6; 2	6; 2
2	(Greece) (Portugal)	Nicolas Kelaidis; João Lagos	6; 4	6; 2	6; 1
3	(Greece) (Portugal)	Nicholas Kalogeropoulos / Nicolas Kelaidis; João Lagos / José Vilela	7; 5	6; 3	6; 2
4	(Greece) (Portugal)	Nicholas Kalogeropoulos; João Lagos	6; 1	8; 6	6; 4
5	(Greece) (Portugal)	Nicolas Kelaidis; José Vilela	3; 6	9; 7	7; 5	4; 6	3; 6

==== Qualifying round ====
Switzerland vs. Great Britain

Switzerland
1
Zürich, Switzerland
2–4 April 1976
Clay

Great Britain
4

			1	2	3	4	5
1	(Switzerland) (United Kingdom)	Dimitri Sturdza; Buster Mottram	2; 6	5; 7	2; 6
2	(Switzerland) (United Kingdom)	Petr Kanderal; Roger Taylor	6; 3	12; 10	3; 6	2; 6	2; 6
3	(Switzerland) (United Kingdom)	Petr Kanderal / Dimitri Sturdza; John Lloyd / Buster Mottram	10; 12	6; 3	6; 3	6; 4
4	(Switzerland) (United Kingdom)	Dimitri Sturdza; Roger Taylor	4; 6	6; 3	2; 6	3; 6
5	(Switzerland) (United Kingdom)	Petr Kanderal; Buster Mottram	2; 6	2; 6	3; 6

Austria vs. Romania

Austria
1
Vienna, Austria
30 April–2 May 1976

Romania
4

			1	2	3	4	5
1	(Austria) (Romania)	Hans Kary; Dumitru Hărădău	6; 2	6; 4	6; 1
2	(Austria) (Romania)	Peter Feigl; Ilie Năstase	1; 6	3; 6	5; 7
3	(Austria) (Romania)	Peter Feigl / Hans Kary; Viorel Marcu / Ilie Năstase	4; 6	6; 8	6; 3	3; 6
4	(Austria) (Romania)	Hans Kary; Ilie Năstase	3; 6	5; 7	1; 6
5	(Austria) (Romania)	Peter Feigl; Dumitru Hărădău	5; 7	6; 4	6; 0	6; 8	5; 7

Italy vs. Poland

Italy
5
Florence, Italy
30 April–2 May 1976
Clay

Poland
0

			1	2	3	4	5
1	(Italy) (Poland)	Adriano Panatta; Czesław Dobrowolski	6; 1	6; 0	6; 3
2	(Italy) (Poland)	Paolo Bertolucci; Henryk Drzymalski	7; 9	6; 4	6; 4	6; 2
3	(Italy) (Poland)	Paolo Bertolucci / Adriano Panatta; Henryk Drzymalski / Jerzy Jasiński	6; 1	6; 4	8; 6
4	(Italy) (Poland)	Paolo Bertolucci; Czesław Dobrowolski	6; 4	6; 4	6; 3
5	(Italy) (Poland)	Adriano Panatta; Henryk Drzymalski	6; 1	6; 0	6; 4

Yugoslavia vs. Greece

Yugoslavia
5
Zagreb, Yugoslavia
30 April–2 May 1976

Greece
0

			1	2	3	4	5
1	(Socialist Federal Republic of Yugoslavia) (Greece)	Nikola Pilić; Nicholas Kalogeropoulos	6; 3	6; 2	6; 2
2	(Socialist Federal Republic of Yugoslavia) (Greece)	Željko Franulović; Nicolas Kelaidis	6; 4	6; 0	6; 2
3	(Socialist Federal Republic of Yugoslavia) (Greece)	Željko Franulović / Nikola Pilić; Nicholas Kalogeropoulos / Nicolas Kelaidis	6; 3	6; 3	7; 9	6; 2
4	(Socialist Federal Republic of Yugoslavia) (Greece)	Nikola Pilić; Nicolas Kelaidis	6; 2	6; 3	7; 5
5	(Socialist Federal Republic of Yugoslavia) (Greece)	Željko Franulović; Nicholas Kalogeropoulos	6; 4	6; 0	6; 0

=== Main draw ===
==== Draw ====
Quarterfinals; 20–23 May
France
bye
Eastbourne, United Kingdom (grass)
Great Britain	5
Romania	0
Bologna, Italy (clay)
Italy	5
Yugoslavia	0
bye
Sweden

Semifinals; 8–18 July
Eastbourne, United Kingdom (grass)
France	1
Great Britain	4
Rome, Italy (clay)
Italy	4
Sweden	0

Final; 5–7 August
Wimbledon, United Kingdom (grass)
Great Britain	1
Italy	4

==== Quarterfinals ====
Great Britain vs. Romania

Great Britain
5
Devonshire Park, Eastbourne, United Kingdom
20–22 May 1976
Grass

Romania
0

			1	2	3	4	5
1	(United Kingdom) (Romania)	Roger Taylor; Viorel Sotiriu	6; 1	6; 1	6; 4
2	(United Kingdom) (Romania)	Buster Mottram; Dumitru Hărădău	6; 2	6; 0	6; 2
3	(United Kingdom) (Romania)	Buster Mottram / Roger Taylor; Dumitru Hărădău / Viorel Marcu	6; 2	6; 1	6; 4
4	(United Kingdom) (Romania)	Buster Mottram; Viorel Sotiriu	6; 2	6; 0	6; 4
5	(United Kingdom) (Romania)	Roger Taylor; Dumitru Hărădău	6; 1	5; 7	6; 3	6; 1

Italy vs. Yugoslavia

Italy
5
Bologna, Italy
21–23 May 1976
Clay

Yugoslavia
0

			1	2	3	4	5
1	(Italy) (Socialist Federal Republic of Yugoslavia)	Corrado Barazzutti; Željko Franulović	6; 1	7; 5	6; 4
2	(Italy) (Socialist Federal Republic of Yugoslavia)	Adriano Panatta; Nikola Pilić	6; 3	6; 4	6; 3
3	(Italy) (Socialist Federal Republic of Yugoslavia)	Paolo Bertolucci / Adriano Panatta; Željko Franulović / Nikola Pilić	6; 2	9; 7	7; 5
4	(Italy) (Socialist Federal Republic of Yugoslavia)	Adriano Panatta; Željko Franulović	6; 1	6; 1	6; 3
5	(Italy) (Socialist Federal Republic of Yugoslavia)	Corrado Barazzutti; Nikola Pilić	6; 0	6; 4	6; 4

==== Semifinals ====
Great Britain vs. France

Great Britain
4
Devonshire Park, Eastbourne, United Kingdom
8–10 July 1976
Grass

France
1

			1	2	3	4	5
1	(United Kingdom) (France)	Roger Taylor; Patrick Proisy	3; 6	6; 2	6; 3	6; 2
2	(United Kingdom) (France)	John Lloyd; François Jauffret	4; 6	6; 2	6; 4	4; 6	8; 6
3	(United Kingdom) (France)	David Lloyd / John Lloyd; François Jauffret / Patrick Proisy	6; 2	6; 4	9; 11	6; 3
4	(United Kingdom) (France)	John Lloyd; Patrick Proisy	1; 6	0; 6	4; 6
5	(United Kingdom) (France)	Roger Taylor; François Jauffret	6; 2	6; 3	6; 1

Italy vs. Sweden

Italy
4
Foro Italico, Rome, Italy
16–18 July 1976
Clay

Sweden
0

			1	2	3	4	5
1	(Italy) (Sweden)	Adriano Panatta; Rolf Norberg	6; 2	6; 2	7; 5
2	(Italy) (Sweden)	Corrado Barazzutti; Kjell Johansson	6; 2	6; 4	3; 6	3; 6	6; 2
3	(Italy) (Sweden)	Paolo Bertolucci / Adriano Panatta; Ove Bengtson / Rolf Norberg	7; 5	6; 2	7; 5
4	(Italy) (Sweden)	Antonio Zugarelli; Kjell Johansson	7; 5	5; 7	8; 6	4; 6	8; 6
5	(Italy) (Sweden)	Corrado Barazzutti; Rolf Norberg	6; 4	2; 6				not completed

==== Final ====
Great Britain vs. Italy

Great Britain
1
No. 1 Court, All England Club, Wimbledon, United Kingdom
5–7 August 1976
Grass

Italy
4

			1	2	3	4	5
1	(United Kingdom) (Italy)	Roger Taylor; Antonio Zugarelli	1; 6	5; 7	6; 3	1; 6
2	(United Kingdom) (Italy)	John Lloyd; Adriano Panatta	7; 5	3; 6	3; 6	6; 2	4; 6
3	(United Kingdom) (Italy)	David Lloyd / John Lloyd; Paolo Bertolucci / Adriano Panatta	6; 8	3; 6	6; 3	18; 16	6; 2
4	(United Kingdom) (Italy)	Roger Taylor; Adriano Panatta	6; 3	2; 6	4; 6	4; 6
5	(United Kingdom) (Italy)	John Lloyd; Antonio Zugarelli	6; 4	8; 6	1; 6	1; 6	1; 6
