= 1975 Davis Cup Eastern Zone =

International tennis competition

The Eastern Zone was one of the three regional zones of the 1975 Davis Cup.

10 teams entered the Eastern Zone: 4 teams entered the competition in the qualifying rounds, with the winners of the 2 head-to-head ties progressing to the preliminary rounds, where they were joined by an additional 4 teams. From the 6 competing teams in the preliminary rounds, 3 head-to-head ties determined the winning teams who progressed to the main draw, joining the remaining 3 teams. Following a knockout competition, the winner of the main draw went on to compete in the Inter-Zonal Zone against the winners of the Americas Zone and Europe Zone.

Australia defeated New Zealand in the final and progressed to the Inter-Zonal Zone.

== Draw ==
Pre-qualifying round
Kuala Lumpur, Malaysia
Malaysia	0
South Vietnam	5
Manila, Philippines
Philippines	3
Pakistan	2

Preliminary round
Saigon, South Vietnam
South Vietnam	3
South Korea	2
Jakarta, Indonesia
Indonesia	0
Japan	5
Colombo, Sri Lanka (clay)
Sri Lanka	1
Philippines	3

Quarterfinals
Auckland, New Zealand (grass)
New Zealand	5
South Vietnam	0
Tokyo, Japan
Japan	5
Philippines	0

Semifinals
Lucknow, India
India	1
New Zealand	3
Adelaide, Australia (grass)
Japan	1
Australia	4

Final
Auckland, New Zealand (grass)
New Zealand	0
Australia	4

=== Pre-qualifying round ===
Malaysia vs. South Vietnam

Malaysia
0
Kuala Lumpur, Malaysia
31 October–2 November 1974

South Vietnam
5

			1	2	3	4	5
1	(Malaysia) (South Vietnam)	Lee Wai-ching; Võ Văn Thành	4; 6	2; 6	3; 6
2	(Malaysia) (South Vietnam)	Zainuddin Meah; Tạ Duy Bảo	7; 5	6; 3	4; 6	5; 7	2; 6
3	(Malaysia) (South Vietnam)	Zainuddin Meah / Tan Poh-seng; Lý Alline An / Võ Văn Thành	6; 8	2; 6	6; 1	3; 6
4	(Malaysia) (South Vietnam)	Zainuddin Meah; Võ Văn Thành	4; 6	4; 6	1; 6
5	(Malaysia) (South Vietnam)	Lee Wai-ching; Tạ Duy Bảo	6; 8	2; 6	4; 6

Philippines vs. Pakistan

Philippines
3
Manila, Philippines
31 October–2 November 1974

Pakistan
2

			1	2	3	4	5
1	(Philippines) (Pakistan)	Eduardo Cruz; Meer Mohammed Khan	6; 3	6; 4	8; 6
2	(Philippines) (Pakistan)	Romeo Rafon; Saeed Meer	2; 6	3; 6	5; 7
3	(Philippines) (Pakistan)	Eduardo Cruz / Micky Dominguez; Saeed Meer / Meer Mohammed Khan	6; 1	6; 4	3; 6	6; 3
4	(Philippines) (Pakistan)	Romeo Rafon; Meer Mohammed Khan	6; 4	11; 9	12; 10
5	(Philippines) (Pakistan)	Ramon Funtera; Saeed Meer	1; 6	1; 6	0; 6

=== Preliminary round ===
South Vietnam vs. South Korea

South Vietnam
3
Saigon, South Vietnam
16–18 November 1974

South Korea
2

			1	2	3	4	5
1	(South Vietnam) (South Korea)	Tạ Duy Bảo; Chung Yong-ho	6; 2	4; 6	0; 6	8; 6	6; 4
2	(South Vietnam) (South Korea)	Võ Văn Thành; Kim Sung-bae	7; 5	4; 6	6; 3	3; 6	1; 6
3	(South Vietnam) (South Korea)	Lý Alline An / Đinh Quốc Tuấn; Choi Boo-kil / Kim Moon-il	6; 8	11; 9	6; 3	6; 3
4	(South Vietnam) (South Korea)	Võ Văn Thành; Chung Yong-ho	6; 4	4; 6	8; 6	6; 3
5	(South Vietnam) (South Korea)	Tạ Duy Bảo; Kim Sung-bae	3; 6	6; 8	6; 3	4; 6

Indonesia vs. Japan

Indonesia
0
Jakarta, Indonesia
15–17 November 1974

Japan
5

			1	2	3	4	5
1	(Indonesia) (Japan)	Gondo Widjojo; Jun Kamiwazumi	4; 6	3; 6	4; 6
2	(Indonesia) (Japan)	Atet Wijono; Toshiro Sakai	4; 6	3; 6	1; 6
3	(Indonesia) (Japan)	Gondo Widjojo / Atet Wijono; Kenichi Hirai / Sachio Kato	3; 6	6; 3	2; 6	6; 4	6; 8
4	(Indonesia) (Japan)	Hadiman; Kenichi Hirai	4; 6	4; 6	5; 7
5	(Indonesia) (Japan)	Samudra Sangitan; Sachio Kato	3; 6	6; 8	3; 6

Sri Lanka vs. Philippines

Sri Lanka
1
Sri Lanka LTA, Colombo, Sri Lanka
29 November–1 December 1974
Clay

Philippines
3

			1	2	3	4	5
1	(Sri Lanka) (Philippines)	Lassantha Fernando; Alexander Marcial	4; 6	3; 6	9; 7	6; 4	1; 6
2	(Sri Lanka) (Philippines)	Sivagnanam Suresh; Romeo Rafon	4; 6	6; 2	1; 6	5; 7
3	(Sri Lanka) (Philippines)	Arjun Fernando / Nihal Fernando; Micky Dominguez / Alexander Marcial	2; 6	2; 6	1; 6
4	(Sri Lanka) (Philippines)	Arjun Fernando; Ramon Funtera	6; 2	4; 6	6; 1	1; 6	6; 3
5	(Sri Lanka) (Philippines)	Sivagnanam Suresh; Micky Dominguez	6; 1	6; 3	2; 3			not completed

=== Quarterfinals ===
New Zealand vs. South Vietnam

New Zealand
5
Stanley Street, Auckland, New Zealand
29 November–1 December 1974
Grass

South Vietnam
0

			1	2	3	4	5
1	(New Zealand) (South Vietnam)	Onny Parun; Võ Văn Thành	6; 1	6; 1	6; 1
2	(New Zealand) (South Vietnam)	Brian Fairlie; Tạ Duy Bảo	6; 2	6; 2	6; 2
3	(New Zealand) (South Vietnam)	Brian Fairlie / Onny Parun; Dương Văn Minh / Đinh Quốc Tuấn	6; 4	6; 2	6; 5
4	(New Zealand) (South Vietnam)	Russell Simpson; Võ Văn Thành	6; 1	6; 1	6; 2
5	(New Zealand) (South Vietnam)	Jeff Simpson; Tạ Duy Bảo	6; 1	6; 1	6; 2

Japan vs. Philippines

Japan
5
Tokyo, Japan
6–8 December 1974

Philippines
0

			1	2	3	4	5
1	(Japan) (Philippines)	Jun Kuki; Romeo Rafon	6; 1	6; 2	6; 1
2	(Japan) (Philippines)	Toshiro Sakai; Alexander Marcial	6; 1	7; 5	6; 0
3	(Japan) (Philippines)	Kenichi Hirai / Sachio Kato; Micky Dominguez / Alexander Marcial	6; 3	8; 10	6; 0	6; 3
4	(Japan) (Philippines)	Jun Kuki; Alexander Marcial	6; 3	6; 2	6; 3
5	(Japan) (Philippines)	Sachio Kato; Romeo Rafon	6; 2	6; 2	6; 2

=== Semifinals ===
India vs. New Zealand

India
1
Lucknow, India
17–19 January 1975

New Zealand
3

			1	2	3	4	5
1	(India) (New Zealand)	Vijay Amritraj; Onny Parun	6; 4	2; 6	12; 10	3; 6	4; 6
2	(India) (New Zealand)	Anand Amritraj; Brian Fairlie	6; 3	8; 6	7; 9	4; 6	5; 7
3	(India) (New Zealand)	Anand Amritraj / Vijay Amritraj; Brian Fairlie / Onny Parun	13; 11	6; 4	4; 6	6; 4
4	(India) (New Zealand)	Anand Amritraj; Onny Parun	7; 5	4; 6	3; 6	8; 6	2; 6
5	(India) (New Zealand)	Vijay Amritraj; Brian Fairlie	6; 3	8; 6	5; 7			not completed

Australia vs. Japan

Australia
4
Memorial Drive Park, Adelaide, Australia
10–12 January 1975
Grass

Japan
1

			1	2	3	4	5
1	(Australia) (Japan)	John Newcombe; Jun Kuki	6; 1	6; 2	6; 3
2	(Australia) (Japan)	Phil Dent; Toshiro Sakai	1; 6	6; 4	6; 2	4; 6	4; 6
3	(Australia) (Japan)	John Alexander / John Newcombe; Kenichi Hirai / Toshiro Sakai	6; 3	5; 7	6; 1	3; 6	6; 3
4	(Australia) (Japan)	John Newcombe; Toshiro Sakai	6; 4	6; 3	6; 3
5	(Australia) (Japan)	Phil Dent; Jun Kuki	8; 6	6; 4	6; 3

=== Final ===
New Zealand vs. Australia

New Zealand
0
Stanley Street, Auckland, New Zealand
28 February–2 March 1975
Grass

Australia
4

			1	2	3	4	5
1	(New Zealand) (Australia)	Brian Fairlie; John Newcombe	5; 7	3; 6	5; 7
2	(New Zealand) (Australia)	Onny Parun; Ken Rosewall	2; 6	4; 6	2; 6
3	(New Zealand) (Australia)	Brian Fairlie / Onny Parun; Geoff Masters / John Newcombe	4; 6	4; 6	5; 7
4	(New Zealand) (Australia)	Brian Fairlie; Ken Rosewall	1; 6	11; 9	5; 7	7; 9
5	(New Zealand) (Australia)	Onny Parun; Geoff Masters	6; 3	10; 8				not completed
