= Tennis at the 1974 Asian Games =

- Venue: Imperial Country Club
- Dates: 2–13 September 1974

Tennis was contested at the 1974 Asian Games in Imperial Country Club, Tehran, Iran. the competition took held from 2 September to 13 September 1974.

Tennis had doubles and singles events for men and women, as well as a mixed doubles competition.

== Medalists ==
Event	Gold	Silver	Bronze
Men's singles	Toshiro Sakai; Japan	Taghi Akbari; Iran	Yehoshua Shalem; Israel
Men's doubles	Japan; Toshiro Sakai; Kenichi Hirai	Iran; Ali Madani; Kambiz Derafshijavan	Japan; Ryoichi Mori; Natsuta Uehara
Men's team	Japan; Kenichi Hirai; Ryoichi Mori; Toshiro Sakai; Natsuta Uehara	China; Gao Hongyun; Lü Zhengyi; Wang Fuzhang; Xu Meilin	Pakistan; Munawar Iqbal; Ismail Majid; Saeed Meer; Meer Muhammad
Women's singles	Lita Sugiarto; Indonesia	Paulina Peisachov; Israel	Lany Kaligis; Indonesia
Women's doubles	Japan; Toshiko Sade; Kayoko Fukuoka	South Korea; Lee Soon-oh; Lee Duk-hee	Japan; Kimiyo Yagahara; Hideko Goto
Women's team	South Korea; Choi Kyung-mi; Lee Duk-hee; Lee Soon-oh; Yang Jeong-soon	China; Guo Hanqin; Jiang Lihua; Yan Dacui; Zhang Ronghua	Japan; Kayoko Fukuoka; Hideko Goto; Toshiko Sade; Kimiyo Yagahara
Mixed doubles	Israel; Yair Wertheimer; Paulina Peisachov	China; Xu Meilin; Zhang Ronghua	Japan; Ryoichi Mori; Kimiyo Yagahara

== Medal table ==
Rank	Nation	Gold	Silver	Bronze	Total
1	Japan (JPN)	4	0	4	8
2	Israel (ISR)	1	1	1	3
3	South Korea (KOR)	1	1	0	2
4	Indonesia (INA)	1	0	1	2
5	China (CHN)	0	3	0	3
6	Iran (IRN)	0	2	0	2
7	Pakistan (PAK)	0	0	1	1
Totals (7 entries)		7	7	7	21
