= 1975 Davis Cup Europe Zone =

International tennis competition

The Europe Zone was one of the three regional zones of the 1975 Davis Cup.

32 teams entered the Europe Zone, competing across 2 sub-zones. 4 teams in each sub-zone entered the competition in the pre-qualifying rounds, competing head-to-head for 2 spots in the preliminary rounds. The 4 winners in the pre-qualifying rounds joined an additional 20 teams in the preliminary rounds, with 12 teams in each sub-zone competing for 4 places in the main draw, to join the 4 finalists from the 1974 Europe Zone.

The winners of each sub-zone's main draw went on to compete in the Inter-Zonal Zone against the winners of the Americas Zone and Eastern Zone.

Sweden defeated Spain in the Zone A final, and Czechoslovakia defeated France in the Zone B final, resulting in both Sweden and France progressing to the Inter-Zonal Zone.

== Zone A ==
=== Pre-qualifying round ===
==== Draw ====
Pre-qualifying round
Tehran, Iran
Iran	5
Lebanon	0
Tel Aviv, Israel (hard)
Israel	5
Luxembourg	0

==== Results ====
Iran vs. Lebanon

Iran
5
Tehran, Iran
23–25 August 1974

Lebanon
0

			1	2	3	4	5
1	(Iran) (Lebanon)	Taghi Akbari; Khoder Issa	6; 1	6; 2	6; 1
2	(Iran) (Lebanon)	Ali Madani; Ahmed Ramadan	6; 2	6; 3	6; 2
3	(Iran) (Lebanon)	Taghi Akbari / Ali Madani; Khoder Issa / Ahmed Ramadan	10; 8	6; 1	6; 2
4	(Iran) (Lebanon)	Habib Saleh; Ahmed Ramadan	7; 5	11; 9	6; 4
5	(Iran) (Lebanon)	Kamyab Derafshijavan; Khoder Issa	8; 6	6; 3	6; 2

Israel vs. Luxembourg

Israel
5
Tel Aviv, Israel
23–25 August 1974
Hard

Luxembourg
0

			1	2	3	4	5
1	(Israel) (Luxembourg)	Yehoshua Shalem; Théo Storck	6; 0	6; 1	6; 1
2	(Israel) (Luxembourg)	Yair Wertheimer; Fernand Claude	6; 2	6; 2	6; 2
3	(Israel) (Luxembourg)	Ruben Porges / Josef Stabholz; Fernand Claude / Joseph Offenheim	6; 1	6; 1	10; 8
4	(Israel) (Luxembourg)	Yehoshua Shalem; Fernand Claude	6; 3	6; 1	6; 3
5	(Israel) (Luxembourg)	Yair Wertheimer; Théo Storck	6; 1	6; 3	6; 1

=== Preliminary rounds ===
==== Draw ====
First Round
Spain
bye
Copenhagen, Denmark (indoor carpet)
Denmark	4
Greece	1
Austria
bye
London, United Kingdom (indoor carpet)
Great Britain	5
Iran	0
Poznań, Poland (clay)
Poland	5
Portugal	0
bye
Sweden
Tel Aviv, Israel (hard)
Israel	0
Switzerland	5
bye
West Germany

Qualifying Round
Murcia, Spain (clay)
Spain	5
Denmark	0
Vienna, Austria (clay)
Austria	0
Great Britain	4
Warsaw, Poland (clay)
Poland	1
Sweden	4
Freiburg, West Germany
Switzerland	0
West Germany	5

==== First round ====
Denmark vs. Greece

Denmark
4
Copenhagen, Denmark
27–29 September 1974
Carpet (indoors)

Greece
1

			1	2	3	4	5
1	(Denmark) (Greece)	Lars Elvstrøm; Nicolas Kelaidis	6; 3	4; 6	4; 6	7; 5	6; 4
2	(Denmark) (Greece)	Tom Christensen; Nicholas Kalogeropoulos	6; 3	3; 6	12; 10	4; 6	6; 3
3	(Denmark) (Greece)	Tom Christensen / Lars Elvstrøm; Nicholas Kalogeropoulos / Nicolas Kelaidis	10; 12	2; 6	6; 1	9; 7	8; 6
4	(Denmark) (Greece)	Lars Elvstrøm; Nicholas Kalogeropoulos	5; 7	5; 7	6; 2	7; 9
5	(Denmark) (Greece)	Tom Christensen; Nicolas Kelaidis	4; 6	6; 2	6; 3	4; 6	6; 5	retired

Great Britain vs. Iran

Great Britain
5
Queen's Club, London, United Kingdom
26–28 September 1974
Carpet (indoors)

Iran
0

			1	2	3	4	5
1	(United Kingdom) (Iran)	Roger Taylor; Mansour Bahrami	6; 0	6; 0	6; 2
2	(United Kingdom) (Iran)	John Lloyd; Ali Madani	6; 1	7; 5	6; 2
3	(United Kingdom) (Iran)	Mark Farrell / John Lloyd; Kamyab Derafshijavan / Ali Madani	6; 1	6; 1	6; 1
4	(United Kingdom) (Iran)	John Lloyd; Mansour Bahrami	7; 5	7; 5	6; 4
5	(United Kingdom) (Iran)	Roger Taylor; Ali Madani	6; 1	6; 3	6; 1

Poland vs. Portugal

Poland
5
Poznań, Poland
20–22 September 1974
Clay

Portugal
0

			1	2	3	4	5
1	(Poland) (Portugal)	Jacek Niedźwiedzki; José Vilela	6; 2	6; 4	6; 0
2	(Poland) (Portugal)	Henryk Drzymalski; Sergio Cruz	6; 2	6; 1	6; 4
3	(Poland) (Portugal)	Wojciech Fibak / Jacek Niedźwiedzki; Sergio Cruz / José Vilela	6; 1	6; 0	6; 2
4	(Poland) (Portugal)	Henryk Drzymalski; José Vilela	7; 5	6; 4	7; 5
5	(Poland) (Portugal)	Jacek Niedźwiedzki; Sergio Cruz	6; 1	6; 0	6; 2

Israel vs. Switzerland

Israel
0
Tel Aviv, Israel
20–22 September 1974
Hard

Switzerland
5

			1	2	3	4	5
1	(Israel) (Switzerland)	Yehoshua Shalem; Dimitri Sturdza	2; 6	3; 6	3; 6
2	(Israel) (Switzerland)	Josef Stabholz; Petr Kanderal	2; 6	1; 6	0; 6
3	(Israel) (Switzerland)	Josef Stabholz / Yair Wertheimer; Dimitri Sturdza / Matthias Werren	7; 9	3; 6	5; 7
4	(Israel) (Switzerland)	Yehoshua Shalem; Petr Kanderal	2; 6	1; 6	6; 4	1; 6
5	(Israel) (Switzerland)	Josef Stabholz; Dimitri Sturdza	4; 6	3; 6	7; 5	6; 8

==== Qualifying round ====
Spain vs. Denmark

Spain
5
Murcia Club de Tenis, Murcia, Spain
2–4 May 1975
Clay

Denmark
0

			1	2	3	4	5
1	(Spain) (Denmark)	José Higueras; Tom Christensen	6; 3	6; 4	6; 1
2	(Spain) (Denmark)	Manuel Orantes; Lars Elvstrøm	6; 3	6; 3	6; 0
3	(Spain) (Denmark)	Juan Gisbert / Manuel Orantes; Tom Christensen / Lars Elvstrøm	6; 1	6; 4	6; 1
4	(Spain) (Denmark)	Antonio Muñoz; Tom Christensen	6; 0	6; 3	6; 0
5	(Spain) (Denmark)	José Higueras; Lars Elvstrøm	6; 3	6; 0	6; 2

Austria vs. Great Britain

Austria
0
Vienna, Austria
2–4 May 1975
Clay

Great Britain
4

			1	2	3	4	5
1	(Austria) (United Kingdom)	Hans Kary; Roger Taylor	3; 6	6; 1	6; 8	1; 6
2	(Austria) (United Kingdom)	Gerhard Wimmer; Buster Mottram	1; 6	1; 6	0; 6
3	(Austria) (United Kingdom)	Hans Kary / Gerhard Wimmer; Buster Mottram / Roger Taylor	4; 6	3; 6	1; 6
4	(Austria) (United Kingdom)	Gerhard Wimmer; Roger Taylor	2; 6	4; 6	6; 2	6; 4	2; 6
5	(Austria) (United Kingdom)	Hans Kary; John Lloyd	6; 2	3; 6	4; 6	5; 4		not completed

Poland vs. Sweden

Poland
1
Legia Stadium, Warsaw, Poland
2–4 May 1975
Clay

Sweden
4

			1	2	3	4	5
1	(Poland) (Sweden)	Wojciech Fibak; Birger Andersson	6; 1	8; 6	6; 2
2	(Poland) (Sweden)	Henryk Drzymalski; Björn Borg	0; 6	0; 6	2; 6
3	(Poland) (Sweden)	Wojciech Fibak / Jacek Niedźwiedzki; Ove Bengtson / Björn Borg	4; 6	2; 6	4; 6
4	(Poland) (Sweden)	Wojciech Fibak; Björn Borg	4; 6	1; 6	6; 8
5	(Poland) (Sweden)	Henryk Drzymalski; Birger Andersson	3; 6	0; 6	2; 6

West Germany vs. Switzerland

West Germany
5
Freiburg, West Germany
2–4 May 1975

Switzerland
0

			1	2	3	4	5
1	(West Germany) (Switzerland)	Hans-Jürgen Pohmann; Dimitri Sturdza	4; 6	6; 4	6; 2	6; 0
2	(West Germany) (Switzerland)	Karl Meiler; Petr Kanderal	6; 2	6; 2	6; 4
3	(West Germany) (Switzerland)	Jürgen Fassbender / Hans-Jürgen Pohmann; Dimitri Sturdza / Matthias Werren	6; 4	6; 2	6; 4
4	(West Germany) (Switzerland)	Karl Meiler; Max Hürlimann	6; 0	6; 2	8; 6
5	(West Germany) (Switzerland)	Harald Elschenbroich; Petr Kanderal	6; 4	6; 0	6; 2

=== Main Draw ===
==== Draw ====
Quarterfinals; 9–18 May
Romania
bye
Barcelona, Spain (clay)
Spain	3
Great Britain	2
West Berlin (clay)
West Germany	2
Sweden	3
bye
Soviet Union

Semifinals; 18–20 July
Barcelona, Spain (clay)
Romania	2
Spain	3
Jūrmala, Soviet Union (clay)
Sweden	3
Soviet Union	2

Final; 25–27 July
Barcelona, Spain (clay)
Spain	2
Sweden	3

==== Quarterfinals ====
Spain vs. Great Britain

Spain
3
Barcelona, Spain
9–11 May 1975
Clay

Great Britain
2

			1	2	3	4	5
1	(Spain) (United Kingdom)	Manuel Orantes; Buster Mottram	6; 4	6; 1	6; 2
2	(Spain) (United Kingdom)	José Higueras; Roger Taylor	4; 6	6; 1	3; 6	3; 6
3	(Spain) (United Kingdom)	Juan Gisbert / Manuel Orantes; Buster Mottram / Roger Taylor	6; 4	6; 4	4; 6	6; 0
4	(Spain) (United Kingdom)	José Higueras; Buster Mottram	1; 6	0; 6	3; 6
5	(Spain) (United Kingdom)	Manuel Orantes; Roger Taylor	6; 3	3; 6	7; 5	5; 7	7; 5

West Germany vs. Sweden

West Germany
2
Rot-Weiss Tennis Club, West Berlin
16–18 May 1975
Clay

Sweden
3

			1	2	3	4	5
1	(West Germany) (Sweden)	Hans-Jürgen Pohmann; Birger Andersson	1; 6	6; 0	6; 3	6; 0
2	(West Germany) (Sweden)	Karl Meiler; Björn Borg	1; 6	12; 14	6; 8
3	(West Germany) (Sweden)	Jürgen Fassbender / Hans-Jürgen Pohmann; Ove Bengtson / Rolf Norberg	6; 2	6; 3	6; 1
4	(West Germany) (Sweden)	Hans-Jürgen Pohmann; Björn Borg	6; 3	0; 6	0; 6	3; 6
5	(West Germany) (Sweden)	Karl Meiler; Birger Andersson	5; 7	1; 6	2; 6

==== Semifinals ====
Spain vs. Romania

Spain
3
Barcelona, Spain
18–20 July 1975
Clay

Romania
2

			1	2	3	4	5
1	(Spain) (Romania)	Manuel Orantes; Toma Ovici	6; 2	6; 2	3; 6	6; 2
2	(Spain) (Romania)	José Higueras; Ilie Năstase	0; 6	6; 8	6; 4	1; 6
3	(Spain) (Romania)	Juan Gisbert / Manuel Orantes; Ilie Năstase / Ion Țiriac	3; 6	4; 6	6; 3	7; 5	6; 2
4	(Spain) (Romania)	Manuel Orantes; Ilie Năstase	2; 6	2; 6	4; 6
5	(Spain) (Romania)	José Higueras; Toma Ovici	6; 2	2; 6	6; 1	5; 7	6; 3

Soviet Union vs. Sweden

Soviet Union
2
Lieupe Tennis Club, Jūrmala, Soviet Union
18–20 July 1975
Clay

Sweden
3

			1	2	3	4	5
1	(Soviet Union) (Sweden)	Anatoli Volkov; Birger Andersson	1; 6	4; 6	4; 6
2	(Soviet Union) (Sweden)	Alex Metreveli; Björn Borg	5; 7	3; 6	3; 6
3	(Soviet Union) (Sweden)	Teimuraz Kakulia / Alex Metreveli; Ove Bengtson / Björn Borg	6; 1	6; 4	8; 6
4	(Soviet Union) (Sweden)	Alex Metreveli; Birger Andersson	6; 3	5; 7	6; 2	6; 3
5	(Soviet Union) (Sweden)	Anatoli Volkov; Björn Borg	6; 8	1; 6	0; 6

==== Final ====
Spain vs. Sweden

Spain
2
Real Club de Tenis Barcelona, Barcelona, Spain
25–27 July 1975
Clay

Sweden
3

			1	2	3	4	5
1	(Spain) (Sweden)	Manuel Orantes; Birger Andersson	6; 1	6; 3	6; 4
2	(Spain) (Sweden)	José Higueras; Björn Borg	3; 6	1; 6	1; 6
3	(Spain) (Sweden)	Juan Gisbert / Manuel Orantes; Ove Bengtson / Björn Borg	6; 4	6; 3	6; 1
4	(Spain) (Sweden)	Manuel Orantes; Björn Borg	4; 6	2; 6	2; 6
5	(Spain) (Sweden)	José Higueras; Birger Andersson	6; 3	4; 6	3; 6	0; 6

== Zone B ==
=== Pre-qualifying round ===
==== Draw ====
Pre-qualifying round 23 August–14 September 1974
Lagos, Nigeria (hard)
Nigeria	5
Kenya	0
Istanbul, Turkey
Turkey	3
Ireland	2

==== Results ====
Nigeria vs. Kenya

Nigeria
5
Lagos, Nigeria
12–14 September 1974
Hard

Kenya
0

			1	2	3	4	5
1	(Nigeria) (Kenya)	Lawrence Awopegba; Selim Rana	6; 3	6; 4	5; 7	6; 3
2	(Nigeria) (Kenya)	Yemisi Allan; Yashvin Shretta	6; 4	3; 6	2; 6	6; 2	6; 4
3	(Nigeria) (Kenya)	Yemisi Allan / Lawrence Awopegba; Selim Rana / Yashvin Shretta	7; 9	6; 3	11; 13	7; 5	10; 8
4	(Nigeria) (Kenya)	Yemisi Allan; Selim Rana	6; 2	7; 5	6; 3
5	(Nigeria) (Kenya)	Kehinde Ajayi; Yashvin Shretta	6; 0	6; 2	6; 1

Turkey vs. Ireland

Turkey
3
Istanbul, Turkey
23–25 August 1974

Ireland
2

			1	2	3	4	5
1	(Turkey) (Republic of Ireland)	Bülent Altınkaya; Kevin Menton	6; 1	6; 1	4; 6	6; 2
2	(Turkey) (Republic of Ireland)	Remzi Aydın; Peter Ledbetter	6; 3	6; 1	0; 6	6; 2
3	(Turkey) (Republic of Ireland)	Bülent Altınkaya / Remzi Aydın; Michael Hickey / Kenneth Reid	2; 6	6; 2	7; 5	6; 4
4	(Turkey) (Republic of Ireland)	Nur Gurak; Kenneth Reid	7; 5	3; 6	3; 6	1; 6
5	(Turkey) (Republic of Ireland)	Hasan Özdemir; Kevin Menton	0; 6	1; 6	1; 6

=== Preliminary rounds ===
==== Draw ====
First Round
Netherlands
bye
Helsinki, Finland
Finland	1
Hungary	4
Egypt
bye
Monte Carlo, Monaco
Monaco	4
Nigeria	1
Brussels, Belgium (indoor hard)
Belgium	5
Norway	0
bye
France
Sofia, Bulgaria
Bulgaria	5
Turkey	0
bye
Yugoslavia

Qualifying Round
Budapest, Hungary
Netherlands	0
Hungary	5
Monte Carlo, Monaco
Egypt	3
Monaco	1
Paris, France (clay)
Belgium	1
France	4
Zagreb, Yugoslavia
Bulgaria	1
Yugoslavia	4

==== First round ====
Finland vs. Hungary

Finland
1
Helsinki, Finland
27–29 September 1974

Hungary
4

			1	2	3	4	5
1	(Finland) (Hungary)	George Berner; Róbert Machán	1; 6	9; 7	6; 8	8; 6	6; 1
2	(Finland) (Hungary)	Pekka Säilä; Balázs Taróczy	1; 6	3; 6	1; 6
3	(Finland) (Hungary)	Mikko Horsma / Matti Timonen; Róbert Machán / Balázs Taróczy	6; 8	9; 7	2; 6	3; 6
4	(Finland) (Hungary)	Pekka Säilä; Róbert Machán	5; 7	8; 6	4; 6	4; 6
5	(Finland) (Hungary)	George Berner; Balázs Taróczy	6; 3	3; 6	4; 6	2; 6

Monaco vs. Nigeria

Monaco
4
Monte Carlo, Monaco
27–29 September 1974

Nigeria
1

			1	2	3	4	5
1	(Monaco) (Nigeria)	Louis Borfiga; Yemisi Allan	6; 3	6; 2	6; 1
2	(Monaco) (Nigeria)	Emmanuel van der Pol; Lawrence Awopegba	6; 3	6; 2	6; 1
3	(Monaco) (Nigeria)	Bernard Balleret / Emmanuel van der Pol; Yemisi Allan / Lawrence Awopegba	6; 1	6; 2	3; 6	6; 3
4	(Monaco) (Nigeria)	Louis Borfiga; Lawrence Awopegba	7; 5	6; 4	6; 0
5	(Monaco) (Nigeria)	Emmanuel van der Pol; Yemisi Allan	6; 1	3; 6	3; 6	5; 7

Belgium vs. Norway

Belgium
5
Brussels, Belgium
13–15 September 1974
Hard (indoors)

Norway
0

			1	2	3	4	5
1	(Belgium) (Norway)	Bernard Mignot; Erik Ulleberg	6; 0	6; 1	6; 4
2	(Belgium) (Norway)	Patrick Hombergen; Per Hegna	6; 3	6; 4	6; 2
3	(Belgium) (Norway)	Patrick Hombergen / Bernard Mignot; Per Hegna / Erik Ulleberg	6; 1	6; 4	6; 3
4	(Belgium) (Norway)	Bernard Mignot; Per Hegna	6; 2	6; 2	6; 0
5	(Belgium) (Norway)	Patrick Hombergen; Erik Ulleberg	7; 5	6; 3	6; 2

Bulgaria vs. Turkey

Bulgaria
5
Sofia, Bulgaria
27–29 September 1974

Turkey
0

			1	2	3	4	5
1	(Bulgaria) (Turkey)	Ljuben Genov; Remzi Aydın	6; 3	6; 0	6; 1
2	(Bulgaria) (Turkey)	Bozhidar Pampoulov; Hasan Özdemir	6; 1	6; 3	6; 1
3	(Bulgaria) (Turkey)	Bozhidar Pampoulov / Matei Pampoulov; Remzi Aydın / Hasan Özdemir	6; 0	6; 1	6; 3
4	(Bulgaria) (Turkey)	Matei Pampoulov; Kemal Anbar	6; 3	6; 0	6; 2
5	(Bulgaria) (Turkey)	Lyubomir Petrov; Hasan Özdemir	6; 3	6; 2	7; 9	6; 0

==== Qualifying round ====
Hungary vs. Netherlands

Hungary
5
Budapest, Hungary
2–4 May 1975

Netherlands
0

			1	2	3	4	5
1	(Hungary) (Netherlands)	Balázs Taróczy; Rolf Thung	7; 5	6; 0	6; 1
2	(Hungary) (Netherlands)	Szabolcs Baranyi; Louk Sanders	6; 4	6; 2	6; 4
3	(Hungary) (Netherlands)	Róbert Machán / Balázs Taróczy; Niklaus Fleury / Louk Sanders	6; 2	8; 6	6; 1
4	(Hungary) (Netherlands)	Balázs Taróczy; Louk Sanders	6; 3	6; 4	6; 2
5	(Hungary) (Netherlands)	Szabolcs Baranyi; Rolf Thung	6; 0	4; 6	6; 0	6; 3

Monaco vs. Egypt

Monaco
1
Monte Carlo, Monaco
2–4 May 1975

Egypt
3

			1	2	3	4	5
1	(Monaco) (Egypt)	Emmanuel van der Pol; Aly El Dawoudi	2; 6	2; 6	5; 7
2	(Monaco) (Egypt)	Louis Borfiga; Ismail El Shafei	4; 6	2; 6	5; 7
3	(Monaco) (Egypt)	Bernard Balleret / Emmanuel van der Pol; Aly El Dawoudi / Ismail El Shafei	3; 6	1; 6	4; 6
4	(Monaco) (Egypt)	Bernard Balleret; Abdel-Ghani Mohammed	7; 5	9; 7	4; 6	6; 4
5	(Monaco) (Egypt)	Emmanuel van der Pol; Ismail El Shafei						not played

France vs. Belgium

France
4
Stade Roland Garros, Paris, France
9–11 May 1975
Clay

Belgium
1

			1	2	3	4	5
1	(France) (Belgium)	Patrice Dominguez; Patrick Hombergen	6; 1	7; 5	6; 1
2	(France) (Belgium)	François Jauffret; Bernard Mignot	8; 6	7; 5	6; 1
3	(France) (Belgium)	Patrice Dominguez / François Jauffret; Patrick Hombergen / Bernard Mignot	1; 6	6; 4	3; 6	14; 16
4	(France) (Belgium)	Patrice Dominguez; Bernard Mignot	6; 2	7; 5	7; 5
5	(France) (Belgium)	François Jauffret; Patrick Hombergen	2; 6	6; 1	6; 1	10; 8

Yugoslavia vs. Bulgaria

Yugoslavia
4
Zagreb, Yugoslavia
2–4 May 1975

Bulgaria
1

			1	2	3	4	5
1	(Socialist Federal Republic of Yugoslavia) (Bulgaria)	Nikola Pilić; Ljuben Genov	6; 3	6; 4	6; 1
2	(Socialist Federal Republic of Yugoslavia) (Bulgaria)	Nikola Špear; Bozhidar Pampoulov	6; 0	6; 3	3; 6	8; 10	2; 6
3	(Socialist Federal Republic of Yugoslavia) (Bulgaria)	Nikola Pilić / Nikola Špear; Bozhidar Pampoulov / Matei Pampoulov	6; 1	6; 3	7; 5
4	(Socialist Federal Republic of Yugoslavia) (Bulgaria)	Nikola Pilić; Bozhidar Pampoulov	6; 0	6; 2	6; 0
5	(Socialist Federal Republic of Yugoslavia) (Bulgaria)	Nikola Špear; Ljuben Genov	6; 1	6; 0	6; 1

=== Main Draw ===
==== Draw ====
Quarterfinals; 16–25 May
Czechoslovakia
bye
Cairo, Egypt
Egypt	2
Hungary	3
Paris, France (clay)
France	3
Yugoslavia	0
bye
Italy

Semifinals; 20–22 June; 18–20 July
Prague, Czechoslovakia (clay)
Czechoslovakia	4
Hungary	1
Paris, France (clay)
France	3
Italy	2

Final; 25–27 July
Prague, Czechoslovakia (clay)
Czechoslovakia	3
France	2

==== Quarterfinals ====
Egypt vs. Hungary

Egypt
2
Cairo, Egypt
16–18 May 1975

Hungary
3

			1	2	3	4	5
1	(Egypt) (Hungary)	Ismail El Shafei; Szabolcs Baranyi	6; 2	6; 4	2; 6	6; 4
2	(Egypt) (Hungary)	Aly El Dawoudi; Balázs Taróczy	2; 6	3; 6	3; 6
3	(Egypt) (Hungary)	Aly El Dawoudi / Ismail El Shafei; Róbert Machán / Balázs Taróczy	2; 6	4; 6	3; 6
4	(Egypt) (Hungary)	Ismail El Shafei; Balázs Taróczy	9; 7	6; 2	15; 13
5	(Egypt) (Hungary)	Aly El Dawoudi; Szabolcs Baranyi	1; 6	7; 5	3; 6	6; 4	2; 6

France vs. Yugoslavia

France
3
Stade Roland Garros, Paris, France
23–25 May 1975
Clay

Yugoslavia
0

			1	2	3	4	5
1	(France) (Socialist Federal Republic of Yugoslavia)	Patrice Dominguez; Željko Franulović	12; 10	8; 6	6; 2
2	(France) (Socialist Federal Republic of Yugoslavia)	François Jauffret; Nikola Pilić	6; 3	7; 5	2; 6	6; 3
3	(France) (Socialist Federal Republic of Yugoslavia)	Patrice Dominguez / François Jauffret; Željko Franulović / Nikola Pilić	9; 7	3; 6	6; 2	6; 3
4	(France) (Socialist Federal Republic of Yugoslavia)	Patrice Dominguez; Nikola Pilić	3; 6	8; 6	3; 6			not completed
5	(France) (Socialist Federal Republic of Yugoslavia)	François Jauffret; Željko Franulović						not played

==== Semifinals ====
Czechoslovakia vs. Hungary

Czechoslovakia
4
Prague, Czechoslovakia
18–20 July 1975
Clay

Hungary
1

			1	2	3	4	5
1	(Czechoslovakia) (Hungary)	Jan Kodeš; Balázs Taróczy	6; 3	4; 6	6; 8	7; 5	8; 6
2	(Czechoslovakia) (Hungary)	Jiří Hřebec; Szabolcs Baranyi	6; 2	3; 6	6; 3	6; 3
3	(Czechoslovakia) (Hungary)	Jiří Hřebec / Jan Kodeš; Róbert Machán / Balázs Taróczy	6; 3	6; 3	6; 4
4	(Czechoslovakia) (Hungary)	Jiří Hřebec; Balázs Taróczy	4; 6	1; 6	2; 6
5	(Czechoslovakia) (Hungary)	Jan Kodeš; Szabolcs Baranyi	8; 6	4; 6	3; 6	7; 5	6; 4

France vs. Italy

France
3
Stade Roland Garros, Paris, France
20–22 June 1975
Clay

Italy
2

			1	2	3	4	5
1	(France) (Italy)	François Jauffret; Adriano Panatta	6; 1	6; 4	8; 6
2	(France) (Italy)	Patrice Dominguez; Corrado Barazzutti	6; 4	0; 6	1; 6	3; 6
3	(France) (Italy)	Patrice Dominguez / François Jauffret; Paolo Bertolucci / Adriano Panatta	1; 6	4; 6	1; 6
4	(France) (Italy)	Patrice Dominguez; Adriano Panatta	6; 3	1; 6	7; 5	6; 3
5	(France) (Italy)	François Jauffret; Corrado Barazzutti	6; 2	4; 6	6; 3	3; 6	6; 3

==== Final ====
Czechoslovakia vs. France

Czechoslovakia
3
Prague, Czechoslovakia
25–27 July 1975
Clay

France
2

			1	2	3	4	5
1	(Czechoslovakia) (France)	Jan Kodeš; Patrice Dominguez	6; 1	6; 4	1; 6	6; 0
2	(Czechoslovakia) (France)	Jiří Hřebec; François Jauffret	6; 4	4; 6	6; 3	2; 6	6; 0
3	(Czechoslovakia) (France)	Jiří Hřebec / Jan Kodeš; Patrice Dominguez / Patrick Proisy	3; 6	6; 3	4; 6	6; 1	3; 6
4	(Czechoslovakia) (France)	Jiří Hřebec; Patrice Dominguez	6; 4	3; 6	4; 6	4; 6
5	(Czechoslovakia) (France)	Jan Kodeš; François Jauffret	6; 1	7; 5	6; 1
