= List of Israel Davis Cup team representatives =

This is a list of tennis players who have represented the Israel Davis Cup team in an official Davis Cup match. Israel have been taking part in the competition since 1949.

== Players ==
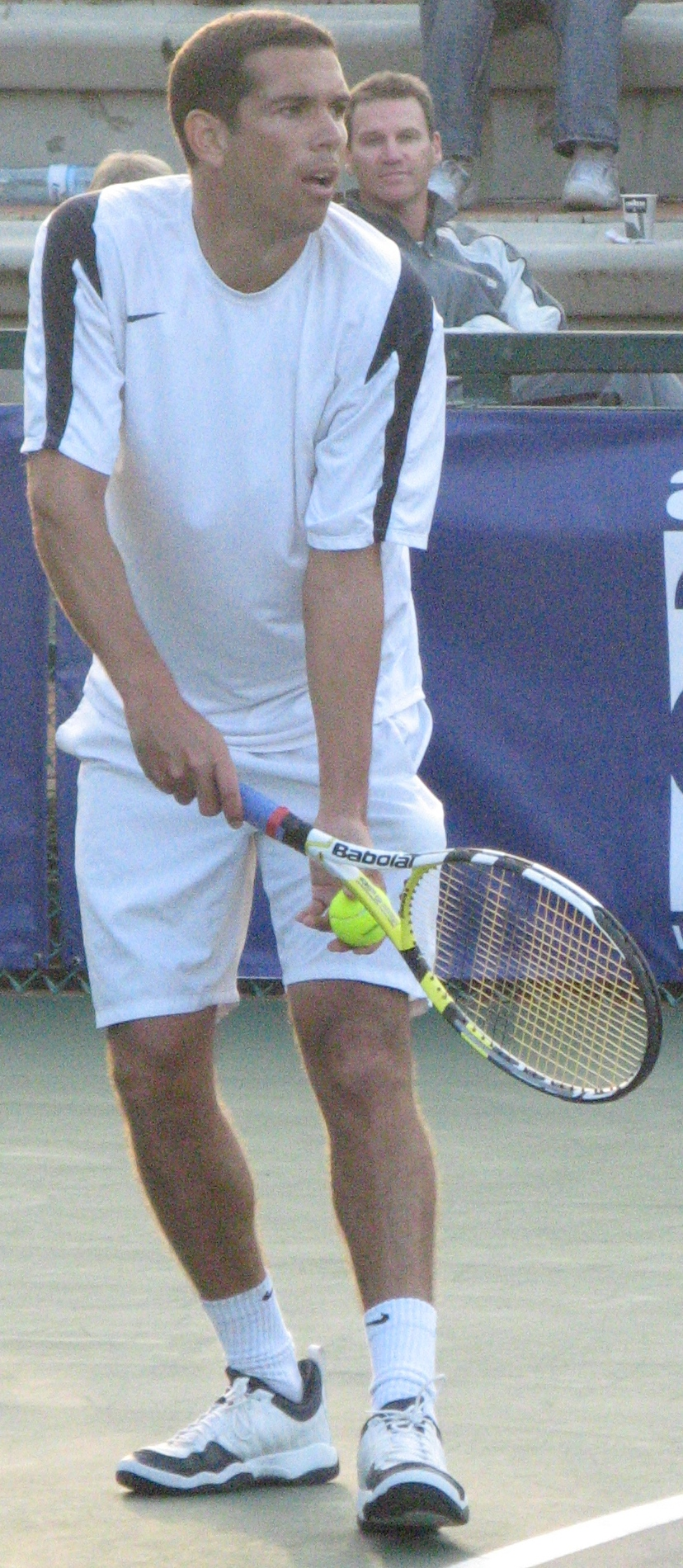
Harel Levy

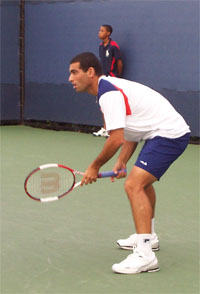
Andy Ram

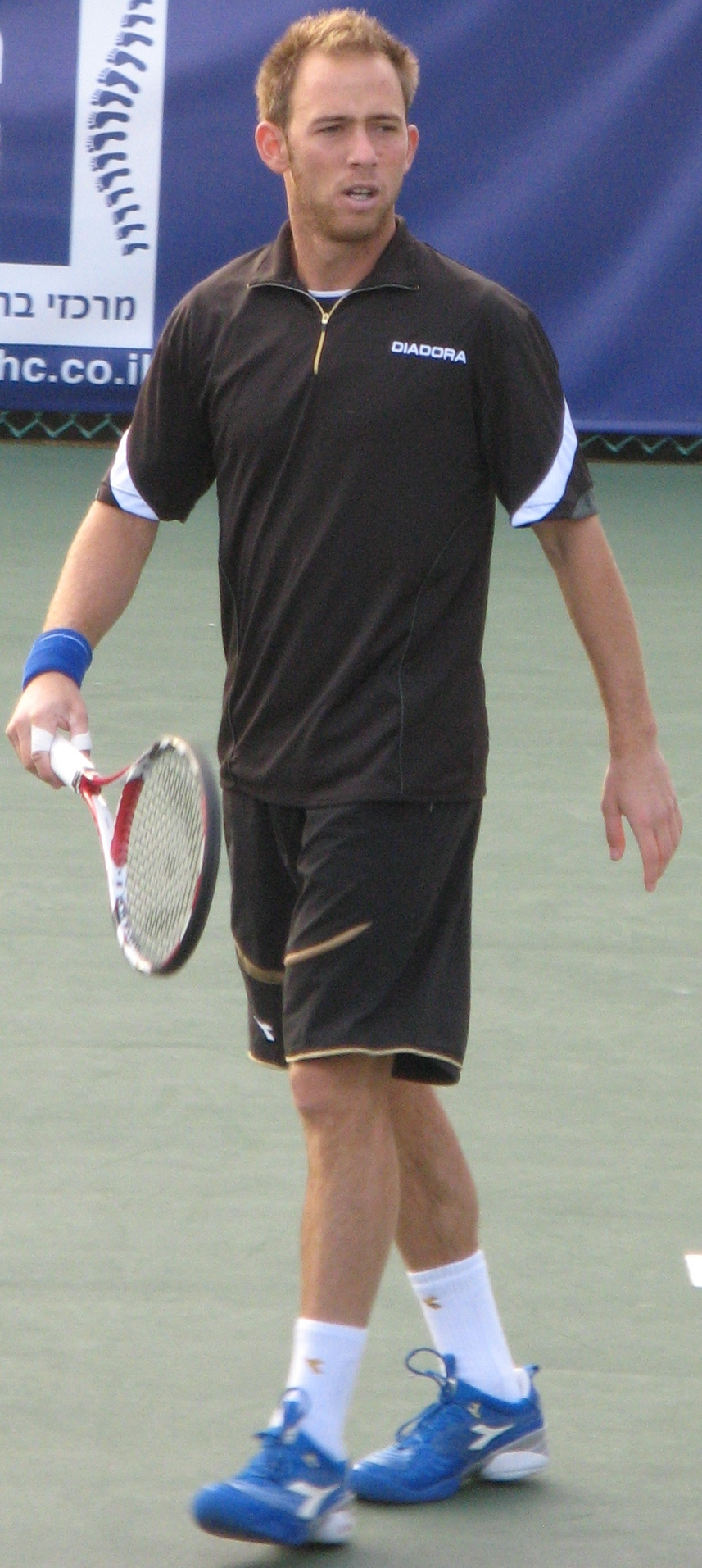
Dudi Sela

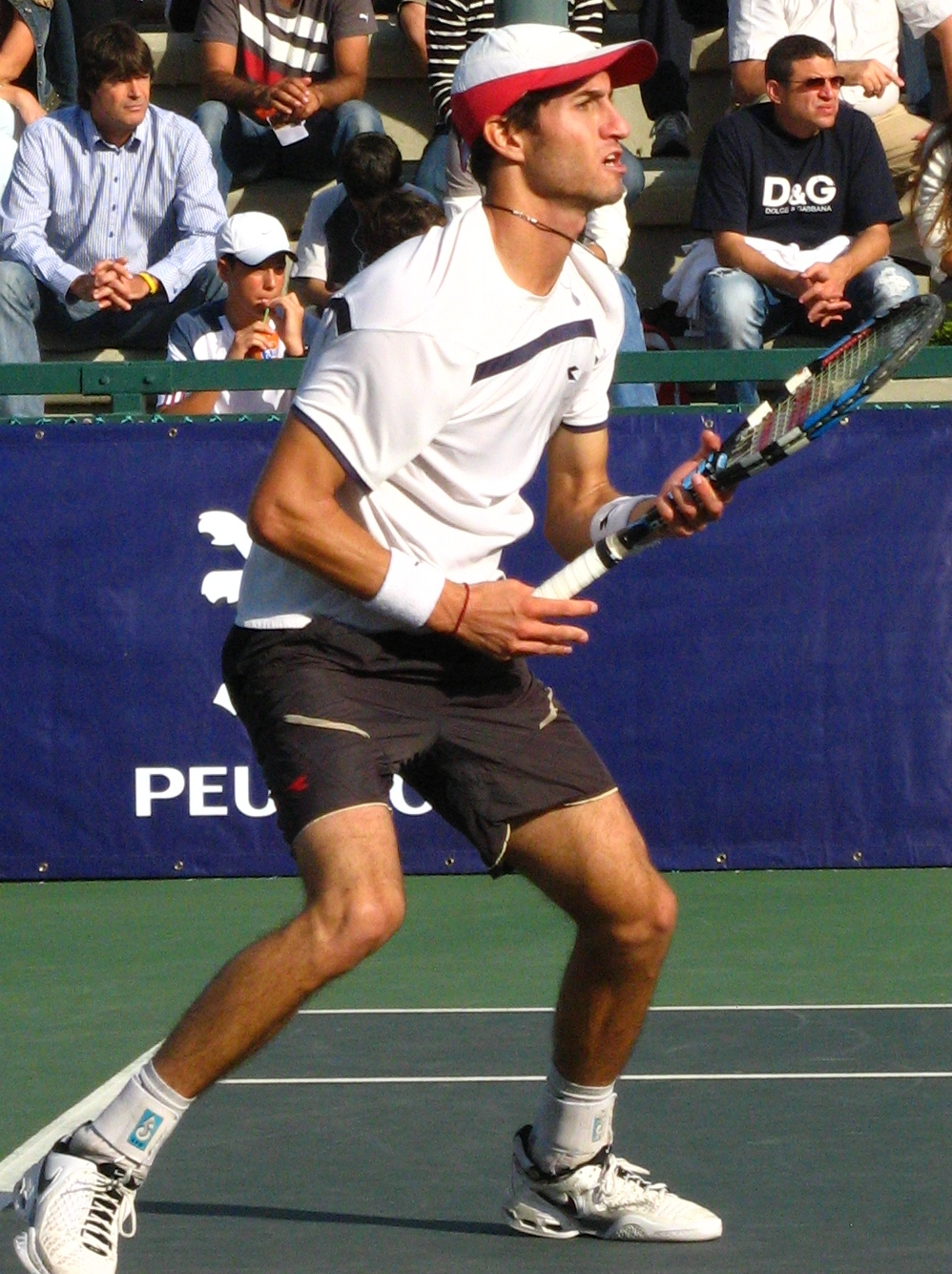
Amir Weintraub

Player	W-L (Total)	W-L (Singles)	W-L (Doubles)	Ties	Debut
Mordechai Apel	0–2	0–1	0–1	1	1953
Haim Arlozorov	0–1	0–1	0–0	1	1980
David Asz	0–2	0–1	0–1	2	1964
Arie Avidan-Weiss	2–21	0–16	2–5	8	1949
Noam Behr	6–7	2–4	4–3	9	1995
Gilad Bloom	13–22	10–17	3–5	17	1986
Jacob Buntmann	0–2	0–2	0–0	1	1950
Eleazar Davidman	17–32	12–20	5–12	17	1956
Gabriel Dubitzky	2–13	1–9	1–4	6	1953
Eyal Erlich	9–7	5–3	4–4	10	1994
Jonathan Erlich	16–6	1–0	15–6	22	2000
Yehuda Finkelkraut	0–4	0–2	0–2	2	1949
Ian Froman	1–4	0–0	1–4	5	1968
Shlomo Glickstein	44–22	31–13	13–9	24	1977
Rafael Gornitsky	0–1	0–0	0–1	1	1949
Amir Hadad	5–7	3–5	2–2	8	1998
Felix Kaplan	1–1	1–1	0–0	1	1974
Steve Krulevitz	4–5	4–3	0–2	4	1978
Ron Lehrner	0–2	0–2	0–0	1	1973
Harel Levy	23–20	20–16	3–4	21	1998
Amos Mansdorf	22–25	18–17	4–8	20	1984
Lior Mor	1–1	1–1	0–0	1	2000
Noam Okun	17–15	16–14	1–1	18	1999
Shahar Perkiss	18–13	6–8	12–5	21	1981
Ruben Porges	1–1	0–0	1–1	2	1974
Andy Ram	18–11	3–4	15–7	24	2000
Eyal Ran	5–10	4–9	1–1	10	1992
David Schneider	4–5	1–3	3–2	6	1981
Dudi Sela	16–12	16–12	0–0	15	2005
Yehoshua Shalem	5–16	5–15	0–1	10	1966
Oded Shay	0–2	0–2	0–0	1	1965
Ilan Sher	2–0	1–0	1–0	2	1977
Josef Stabholz	7–20	3–15	4–5	13	1966
Dekel Valtzer	0–1	0–1	0–0	1	2006
Raviv Weidenfeld	1–0	1–0	0–0	1	1990
Amir Weintraub	3–2	3–2	0–0	3	2011
Meir Wertheimer	11–10	6–4	5–6	12	1972
