= Dekel Valtzer =

Israeli former professional tennis player

- Native name: דקל ולצר
- Country (sports): Israel
- Born: 3 October 1984 (age 42)
- Prize money: $54,390

Singles
- Highest ranking: No. 388 (24 Mar 2008)

Doubles
- Highest ranking: No. 331 (14 Jan 2008)

Dekel Valtzer (Hebrew: דקל ולצר; born 3 October 1984) is an Israeli former professional tennis player.

Valtzer was the 2005 winner of the Israeli Championships, defeating Amir Weintraub in the final.

In 2006 he was called into the Israel Davis Cup team for a tie against Great Britain in Eastbourne and played a dead rubber reverse singles, which he lost to Alan Mackin. It was his first time playing on grass.

On the professional tour, Valtzer had a best singles ranking of 388 in the world and won two ITF Futures titles. As a doubles player he won a further six Futures tournaments, with a highest ranking of 331.

== ITF Futures titles ==
=== Singles: (2) ===
No.	Date	Tournament	Surface	Opponent	Score
1.	Mar 2006	Israel F3, Haifa	Hard	(Israel) Ishay Hadash	6–1, 6–2
2.	Jun 2007	Turkey F6, Enka (Istanbul)	Hard	(France) Ludovic Walter	6–3, 7–6^{(4)}

=== Doubles: (6) ===
No.	Date	Tournament	Surface	Partner	Opponents	Score
1.	Aug 2005	Lithuania F2 Vilnius	Clay	(Lithuania) Rolandas Muraška	(Sweden) Johan Brunström (Finland) Lauri Kiiski	6–3, 2–6, 6–3
2.	Mar 2006	Israel F3, Haifa	Hard	(Israel) Amir Weintraub	(Russia) Sergei Krotiouk (Israel) Alexei Milner	6–1, 6–4
3.	Jul 2006	Turkey F4, Istanbul	Hard	(Israel) Amir Weintraub	(Australia) Matthew Ebden (Australia) Aidan Fitzgerald	6–2, 7–5
4.	Jun 2007	Turkey F4, Ankara	Clay	(Israel) Amir Weintraub	(Germany) Alexander Satschko (Germany) Marc-Andre Stratling	2–6, 6–4, 7–5
5.	Jun 2007	Turkey F5, İzmir	Hard	(Israel) Amir Weintraub	(Brazil) Rodrigo-Antonio Grilli (Brazil) Márcio Torres	6–3, 7–6^{(4)}
6.	Jun 2007	Turkey F6, Enka (Istanbul)	Hard	(Israel) Amir Weintraub	(Israel) Guy Kubi (Israel) Alexei Milner	6–0, 6–1

== See also ==
- List of Israel Davis Cup team representatives
