= Akhtar Ali =

Indian tennis player (1939–2021)

S. Akhtar Ali
- Country (sports): India
- Born: 5 July 1939 Allahabad, India
- Died: 7 February 2021 (aged 81) Kolkata, India
- Turned pro: 1956 (amateur)
- Retired: 1983

Singles
- Career record: 40–54
- Career titles: 5

Grand Slam singles results
- French Open: 2R (1961)
- Wimbledon: 2R (1956, 1958)

Akhtar Ali (Urdu: اختر علی) (5 July 1939 – 7 February 2021), was an Indian tennis player. He was a member of the Indian Davis Cup team continuously from 1958 to 1964 and captain of Indian Davis Cup in 2008.

== Career ==
He played his first known singles tournament in 1956 at the Rothmans Invitation at Eastbourne. The same year whilst touring England he won his first singles title at the New Malden Open against compatriot Arvind Charanjiva. He won his final known singles title at Jaipur in 1964.

He played his final known tournament at the Singapore Grass Court Championships in 1983 at the age of 44. He competed at the Wimbledon Championships four times with his best result coming in 1961 when he made it to the second round. He also competed at French Championships played at Roland Garros in 1956 and 1958.

His other career highlights include; winning the Ceylon Championships in 1960 against Sumant Misra and 1962 against V.R. Balasubramaniam. He also won the Saint-Lunaire International in France against Lew Gerrard and the Jaipur International against Alan Mills.

== Post-playing career ==
Later he turned to coaching and coached the players like Ramesh Krishnan, Vijay Amritraj, Anand Amritraj and Leander Paes. He was father of Zeeshan Ali, a former Indian national tennis champion, Nilofer Ali and Zareen Desai.

Akhtar Ali started a junior development programme at the South Club. The trainees were divided into three categories — under-14, under-16 and under-18. Free coaching was provided to the state's best players.

Akhtar Ali died on 7 February 2021, aged 81.

== Awards ==
Winner of the Arjuna Awardees in Lawn Tennis in 2000.

Allsport Management, a city-based sports management company along with Ontrack Systems Ltd., an ISO 9001:2000 global IT & ITES company, presented GOLDEN AKHTAR, a programme to felicitate Akhtar Ali on his 50th year of yeoman service to Indian Tennis on Wednesday, 21 September 2005 at ITC Sonar Bangla Sheraton Hotel & Tower in Kolkata.
