= 1975 Davis Cup Americas Zone =

Regional zone

The Americas Zone was one of the three regional zones of the 1975 Davis Cup.

Twelve teams entered the Americas Zone split across two sub-zones, the North & Central America Zone and the South America Zone. Nine teams played in the preliminary rounds, competing to advance to the main draw and join the remaining three teams who advanced to the main draw directly. The winners of each sub-zone main draw then played against each other to determine who moved to the Inter-Zonal Zone to compete against the winners of the Eastern Zone and Europe Zone.

South Africa were declared winners of the North & Central America Zone by walkover after Colombia withdrew ahead of the final, while in the South America Zone Chile defeated Brazil in the final. In the Americas Inter-Zonal Final, Chile defeated South Africa and progressed to the Inter-Zonal Zone.

== North & Central America Zone ==
=== Preliminary rounds ===
==== Draw ====
First Round; 4–13 October 1974
Nassau, Bahamas (clay)
Caribbean/West Indies	0
United States	5
Quebec City, Canada (indoor carpet)
Canada	1
Mexico	4

Qualifying Round; 31 January–2 February
Palm Springs, CA, United States (hard)
United States	2
Mexico	3

==== First round ====
Caribbean/West Indies vs. United States

Caribbean/West Indies
0
Ocean Club, Nassau, Bahamas
11–13 October 1974
Clay

United States
5

			1	2	3	4	5
1	(Cricket West Indies) (United States)	Richard Russell; Arthur Ashe	2; 6	1; 6	1; 6
2	(Cricket West Indies) (United States)	Leo Rolle; Tom Gorman	4; 6	2; 6	4; 6
3	(Cricket West Indies) (United States)	John Antonas / Leo Rolle; Charlie Pasarell / Erik van Dillen	2; 6	1; 6	1; 6
4	(Cricket West Indies) (United States)	Leo Rolle; Charlie Pasarell	6; 1	9; 11	1; 6	6; 4	2; 6
5	(Cricket West Indies) (United States)	Richard Russell; Tom Gorman	2; 6	6; 3	1; 6	3; 6

Canada vs. Mexico

Canada
1
Quebec City, Canada
4–6 October 1974
Carpet (indoors)

Mexico
4

			1	2	3	4	5
1	(Canada) (Mexico)	Donald McCormick; Raúl Ramírez	0; 6	2; 6	4; 6
2	(Canada) (Mexico)	Tony Bardsley; Joaquín Loyo Mayo	2; 6	2; 6	2; 6
3	(Canada) (Mexico)	Réjean Genois / Pierre Lamarche; Raúl Ramírez / Vicente Zarazúa	1; 6	0; 6	2; 6
4	(Canada) (Mexico)	Donald McCormick; Joaquín Loyo Mayo	4; 6	6; 4	10; 8	6; 2
5	(Canada) (Mexico)	Réjean Genois; Roberto Chávez	6; 0	4; 6	3; 6	11; 13

==== Qualifying round ====
United States vs. Mexico

United States
2
The Racquet Club, Palm Springs, CA, United States
31 January–2 February 1975
Hard

Mexico
3

			1	2	3	4	5
1	(United States) (Mexico)	Stan Smith; Raúl Ramírez	6; 3	4; 6	1; 6	6; 8
2	(United States) (Mexico)	Roscoe Tanner; Roberto Chávez	6; 1	6; 3	6; 3
3	(United States) (Mexico)	Bob Lutz / Dick Stockton; Raúl Ramírez / Vicente Zarazúa	6; 4	3; 6	8; 6	4; 6	4; 6
4	(United States) (Mexico)	Roscoe Tanner; Raúl Ramírez	5; 7	9; 7	4; 6	2; 6
5	(United States) (Mexico)	Stan Smith; Roberto Chávez	6; 2	9; 7	6; 1

=== Main Draw ===
==== Draw ====
Semifinals
Colombia
bye
South Africa	w/o
Mexico (Note: Due to their opposition to the apartheid policies of the South African government, the Mexican government refused to allow the tie between Mexico and South Africa to take place: the tie was scratched and South Africa advanced.)

Final
Colombia
South Africa	w/o

South Africa were declared the winners of the North & Central America Zone by default after both Mexico and Colombia withdrew.

== South America Zone ==
=== Preliminary rounds ===
==== Draw ====
First Round
Uruguay	w/o
Ecuador
Argentina
bye
bye
Brazil
bye
Bolivia

Qualifying Round; 15–17 November 1974; 13–15 December 1974
Montevideo, Uruguay
Uruguay	0
Argentina	5
São Paulo, Brazil
Brazil	4
Bolivia	0

==== Qualifying round ====
Uruguay vs. Argentina

Uruguay
0
Montevideo, Uruguay
15–17 November 1974

Argentina
5

			1	2	3	4	5
1	(Uruguay) (Argentina)	Gustavo Stapf; Julián Ganzábal	4; 6	1; 6	1; 6
2	(Uruguay) (Argentina)	Hugo Roverano; Ricardo Cano	1; 6	1; 6	4; 6
3	(Uruguay) (Argentina)	José Luis Damiani / Mario Laborde; Ricardo Cano / Julián Ganzábal	4; 6	2; 6	4; 6
4	(Uruguay) (Argentina)	Gustavo Stapf; Ricardo Cano	2; 6	0; 6	1; 6
5	(Uruguay) (Argentina)	Hugo Roverano; Tomás Miguel Lynch	0; 6	1; 6	3; 6

Brazil vs. Bolivia

Brazil
4
São Paulo, Brazil
13–15 December 1974

Bolivia
0

			1	2	3	4	5
1	(Brazil) (Bolivia)	Thomaz Koch; Ramiro Benavides	6; 2	6; 2	6; 1
2	(Brazil) (Bolivia)	José Edison Mandarino; Eduardo Gorostiaga	6; 0	6; 1	6; 2
3	(Brazil) (Bolivia)	Thomaz Koch / José Edison Mandarino; Ramiro Benavides / Eduardo Gorostiaga	6; 4	6; 1	6; 2
4	(Brazil) (Bolivia)	José Edison Mandarino; Ramiro Benavides	6; 3	10; 8	6; 8	6; 1
5	(Brazil) (Bolivia)	Thomaz Koch; Eduardo Gorostiaga						not played

=== Main Draw ===
==== Draw ====
Semifinals; 20–22 December 1974
Chile
bye
São Paulo, Brazil (clay)
Brazil	3
Argentina	2

Final; 10–12 January
Santiago, Chile
Chile	4
Brazil	1

==== Semifinals ====
Brazil vs. Argentina

Brazil
3
São Paulo, Brazil
20–22 December 1974
Clay

Argentina
2

			1	2	3	4	5
1	(Brazil) (Argentina)	Thomaz Koch; Ricardo Cano	6; 3	7; 5	2; 6	6; 1
2	(Brazil) (Argentina)	José Edison Mandarino; Guillermo Vilas	6; 8	2; 6	13; 11	4; 6
3	(Brazil) (Argentina)	Thomaz Koch / José Edison Mandarino; Ricardo Cano / Guillermo Vilas	6; 1	6; 3	7; 5
4	(Brazil) (Argentina)	Thomaz Koch; Guillermo Vilas	4; 6	3; 6	1; 6
5	(Brazil) (Argentina)	José Edison Mandarino; Ricardo Cano	2; 6	8; 6	3; 6	6; 2	6; 1

==== Final ====
Chile vs. Brazil

Chile
4
Santiago, Chile
10–12 January 1975

Brazil
1

			1	2	3	4	5
1	(Chile) (Brazil)	Jaime Fillol; Thomaz Koch	6; 2	7; 5	8; 6
2	(Chile) (Brazil)	Patricio Cornejo; José Edison Mandarino	6; 2	7; 5	6; 4
3	(Chile) (Brazil)	Patricio Cornejo / Jaime Fillol; Thomaz Koch / José Edison Mandarino	6; 2	6; 2	6; 4
4	(Chile) (Brazil)	Jaime Fillol; Luis Felipe Tavares	6; 3	6; 4	6; 2
5	(Chile) (Brazil)	Jaime Pinto Bravo; Thomaz Koch	2; 6	3; 6	3; 6

=== Americas Inter-Zonal Final ===
Chile vs. South Africa

Chile
5
Santiago, Chile
18–20 July 1975

South Africa
0

			1	2	3	4	5
1	(Chile) (South Africa)	Patricio Cornejo; Bernard Mitton	4; 6	6; 4	6; 2	7; 5
2	(Chile) (South Africa)	Jaime Fillol; Ray Moore	6; 3	6; 3	0; 6	3; 6	6; 3
3	(Chile) (South Africa)	Patricio Cornejo / Jaime Fillol; Frew McMillan / Ray Moore	7; 5	6; 2	6; 4
4	(Chile) (South Africa)	Jaime Fillol; Bernard Mitton	2; 6	6; 2	3; 6	6; 1	7; 5
5	(Chile) (South Africa)	Patricio Cornejo; Ray Moore	6; 3	6; 4	4; 6	6; 3
