= Racquet Club of Palm Springs =

Former resort

- Interactive map of Racquet Club of Palm Springs
- Location: 2743 N. Indian Canyon Drive; Palm Springs, California
- Coordinates: 33.855°N 116.546°W
- Owner: Olivia Communities

Construction
- Opened: 1934
- Renovated: 1977, 1999
- Closed: 2014
- Demolished: 2014
- Cost: $78,000 (1934 investment)
- Architects: Albert Frey "Schiff House" and bungalows

The Racquet Club was a resort in Palm Springs, California, founded by actors Charles Farrell and Ralph Bellamy, which opened on December 15, 1934. Originally designed to include two tennis courts, it expanded to include additional courts, the Bamboo Room bar, bungalows, and a swimming pool.

== Overview ==
Julie Copeland was the longtime hostess of the club. Frank Bogert, who later served as mayor of Palm Springs, was an early manager of the club. Champion players such as Arthur Ashe, Dick Savitt, Jimmy Connors, Roy Emerson, Chris Evert, Pancho Gonzales, Billie Jean King, Jack Kramer, Rod Laver, Bob Lutz, Gene Mako, Alice Marble, Charlie Pasarell, Bobby Riggs, Ken Rosewall, Pancho Segura, Stan Smith, Roscoe Tanner, Mike Franks, and Ellsworth Vines all played at the club. The club also served as a gathering place and party venue for much of Hollywood's show business elite. The club was the venue for the 1975 Davis Cup Americas Zone, but in subsequent years, it suffered a decline. After a massive fire on July 23, 2014, the building was demolished.

== The Racquet Club in popular media ==
The Jack Benny Program (also broadcast as The Jack Benny Show), a 1932–1965 radio and TV series, featured a radio episode titled "Murder at the Racquet Club" on March 9, 1941. Charles Farrell guest-starred.

The Star Studded Ride, a 1954 short film, featured stars Gussie Moran and Dave Gillam at the Racquet Club.

Pin-up photographer Bruno Bernard is credited with first photographing Marilyn Monroe at the Racquet Club in 1947, and it was at the club's pool where she met talent agent Johnny Hyde.
