= Ceylon Championships =

Defunct tennis tournament
- Founded: 1884–1976
- Editions: 92
- Location: Hill Club Tennis Club; Nuwara Eliya; Ceylon (1884–1971); Sri Lanka (1972–1976)
- Surface: outdoor (clay) & outdoor (grass)

The Ceylon Championships (1884-1972) later known as the Sri Lankan Championships (1972–76) was a men's and women's national tennis tournament held at the Hill Club LTC, Nuwara Eliya British Ceylon now Sri Lanka from 1884 through 1976.

== History ==
The Ceylon Championships were founded in 1884 and staged at the Hill Club Tennis Club, Nuwara Eliya, British Ceylon now known as Sri Lanka the event later became known as the Sri Lanka Open which was not staged until 1976. The tournaments first three editions were men's only events. In 1887 the first women's singles event was held that was won by Isa Watson. The most successful men's player in singles was Edward De Fonblanque who won a record ten championship titles and the most successful ladies player in singles was Doreen Sansoni who won a record seven championship titles. The event was re-established as the Sri Lanka Open in 2007. The event was staged on either grass courts or clay courts.

== Finals ==
=== Men's singles ===
| Year | Champion | Runner-up | Score |
|---|---|---|---|
| 1884 | (United Kingdom) Charles Ross | (United Kingdom) James Parsons Dove | 6-5, 5-6, 6-1, 6-4 |
| 1885 | (United Kingdom) James Parsons Dove | (United Kingdom) Thomas Gallwey | 6-2, 6-4, 4-6, 6-5 |
| 1886 | (United Kingdom) Charles De Fonblanque | (United Kingdom) Edward Farquharson | 6-4, 6-5, 4-6, 4-6, 6-4 |
| 1887 | (United Kingdom) Charles De Fonblanque | (United Kingdom) Edward Farquharson | 6-4, 6-4, 6-2 |
| 1888 | (United Kingdom) Charles De Fonblanque | (United Kingdom) Charles Hayes | 6-8, 8-6, 4-6, 6-3, 6-2 |
| 1889 | (United Kingdom) Charles De Fonblanque | (United Kingdom) Alfred Dennison | 6-2, 6-3, 6-4 |
| 1890 | (United Kingdom) James Parsons Dove | (United Kingdom) Hugh Keith | 6-3, 5-7, 6-2, 6-3 |
| 1891 | (United Kingdom) Charles De Fonblanque | (United Kingdom) Alfred Dennison | 6-3, 6-4, 3-6, 6-3 |
| 1892 | (United Kingdom) Charles De Fonblanque | (United Kingdom) P. A. Scott | 4-6, 2-6, 7-5, 7-5, 6-3 |
| 1893 | (United Kingdom) Charles De Fonblanque | (United Kingdom) Eustace Stephens | 5-7, 6-3, 6-2, 6-4 |
| 1894 | (United Kingdom) Charles De Fonblanque | (United Kingdom) Eustace Stephens | 3-6, 4-6, 6-4, 7-5, 6-2 |
| 1895 | (United Kingdom) Fred Hadden | (United Kingdom) William Mitchell | 6-4, 6-4, 6-3 |
| 1896 | (United Kingdom) Charles De Fonblanque | (United Kingdom) Eustace Stephens | 6-2, 4-6, 3-6, 11-9, 6-4 |
| 1897 | (United Kingdom) Charles De Fonblanque | (United Kingdom) Eustace Stephens | 6-4, 6-8, 6-4, 6-3 |
| 1898 | (United Kingdom) Douglas Kelly | (United Kingdom) Edgar Vandespar | 6-4, 7-5, 7-5 |
| 1899 | (United Kingdom) Eustace Stephens | (United Kingdom) Douglas Kelly | 6-8, 6-1, 8-6, 6-1 |
| 1900 | (United Kingdom) Douglas Kelly | (United Kingdom) Eustace Stephens | 2-6, 6-2, 6-2, 6-3 |
| 1901 | (United Kingdom) Bertie Knight | (United Kingdom) Douglas Kelly | 4-6, 6-3, 6-1, 3-6, 6-4 |
| 1902 | (United Kingdom) Eustace Stephens | (United Kingdom) Bertie Knight | 6-2, 6-2, 8-6 |
| 1903 | (United Kingdom) Eustace Stephens | (United Kingdom) Fred Hadden | 6-1, 6-1, 6-2 |
| 1904 | (United Kingdom) Douglas Kelly | (United Kingdom) G. H. Bennett | 8-6, 6-2, 6-2 |
| 1905 | (United Kingdom) Stuart Pickering Hayley | (United Kingdom) Francis Poyntz-Roberts | 3-6, 6-1, 6-4 |
| 1906 | (United Kingdom) Stuart Pickering Hayley | (United Kingdom) Alec Hayley | 6-2, 6-4, 3-6, 3-6, 6-0 |
| 1907 | (United Kingdom) Douglas Kelly | (United Kingdom) Stuart Pickering Hayley | 6-2, 8-6, 2-6, 7-5 |
| 1908 | (United Kingdom) Douglas Kelly | (United Kingdom) Arthur Cooper | 6-2, 4-6, 6-1, 6-2 |
| 1909 | (United Kingdom) Stuart Pickering Hayley | (United Kingdom) Douglas Kelly | 6-1, 6-2, 1-6, 1-6, 8-6 |
| 1910 | (United Kingdom) Stuart Pickering Hayley | (United Kingdom) Gordon Windus | 7-5, 7-5, 6-8, 6-3 |
| 1911 | (United Kingdom) Stuart Pickering Hayley | (United Kingdom) Gordon Windus | 6-0, 8-6, 6-1 |
| 1912 | (United Kingdom) Douglas Kelly | (United Kingdom) Stuart Pickering Hayley | 6-3, 5-7, 6-3, 4-6, 6-4 |
| 1913 | (United Kingdom) Arthur Cooper | (United Kingdom) Douglas Kelly | 3-6, 10-8, 6-2, 6-3 |
| 1914 | (West Germany) E. Spitz | (United Kingdom) Arthur Cooper | 9-7, 6-4, 9-7 |
| 1915-18 | No competition | | |
| 1919 | (Dominion of Ceylon) E. R. de Saram | (United Kingdom) Louis Wright | |
| 1920 | (Dominion of Ceylon) Oscar Pinto | (United Kingdom) Guy Boustead | |
| 1921 | (Dominion of Ceylon) Oscar Pinto | (Dominion of Ceylon) Reginald Gaddum | |
| 1922 | (United Kingdom) Lionel Woodhouse | (Dominion of Ceylon) Oscar Pinto | |
| 1923 | (Dominion of Ceylon) Oscar Pinto | (United Kingdom) Lionel Woodhouse | |
| 1924 | (Dominion of Ceylon) Oscar Pinto | (Dominion of Ceylon) Fred J. de Saram Sr. | |
| 1925 | (Dominion of Ceylon) Fred J. de Saram Sr. | (Dominion of Ceylon) Oscar Pinto | |
| 1926 | (Dominion of Ceylon) Lionel Loos | (Dominion of Ceylon) Churchill Gunasekara | 6-3, 6-3, 14-12 |
| 1927 | (Dominion of Ceylon) Oscar Pinto | (Dominion of Ceylon) Lionel Loos | |
| 1928 | (United Kingdom) G. M. Rennie | (Dominion of Ceylon) G. O. Nicholas | |
| 1929 | (Dominion of Ceylon) Oscar Pinto | (Dominion of Ceylon) G. O. Nicholas | |
| 1930 | (Dominion of Ceylon) G. O. Nicholas | (United Kingdom) David Balfour | |
| 1931 | (Dominion of Ceylon) G. O. Nicholas | (Dominion of Ceylon) Churchill Gunasekara | 5-7, 7-5, 5-7, 7-5, 6-2 |
| 1932 | (Dominion of Ceylon) Oscar Pinto | (Dominion of Ceylon) Churchill Gunasekara | 6-2, 4-6, 7-5, 6-1 |
| 1933 | (New Zealand) Eskell 'Buster' Andrews | (Dominion of Ceylon) G. O. Nicholas | |
| 1934 | (Dominion of Ceylon) G. O. Nicholas | (Dominion of Ceylon) James Piachaud | |
| 1935 | (India) N. Krishnaswami | (Dominion of Ceylon) Hildon Sansoni | |
| 1936 | (India) N. Krishnaswami | (Dominion of Ceylon) Hildon Sansoni | |
| 1937 | (India) Yaswanath-Rao Savur | (India) N. Krishnaswami | 6-2, 6-3, 7-5 |
| 1938 | (Dominion of Ceylon) Hildon Sansoni | (India) Tenkasi Ramanathan | |
| 1939 | (Dominion of Ceylon) Hildon Sansoni | (Dominion of Ceylon) Fredrick de Saram | 6-4, 6-0, 10-8 |
| 1940 | (India) Anat Gupte | (Dominion of Ceylon) James Piachaud | 6-1, 6-0, 6-1 |
| 1941 | (Dominion of Ceylon) Fred J. de Saram | (Dominion of Ceylon) Roland Abeyratne | 3-6, 6-0, 4-6, 6-3, 6-4 |
| 1942-45 | No competition | | |
| 1946 | (India) B. R. Kapanipathy | (Dominion of Ceylon) Fred J. de Saram | 3-6, 6-3, 1-6, 6-3, 6-4 |
| 1947 | (Dominion of Ceylon) Fred J. de Saram | (India) B. R. Kapanipathy | 6-2, 6-2, 6-4 |
| 1948 | (India) Ghaus Mohammad | (Dominion of Ceylon) Fred J. de Saram | 8-10, 6-3, 2-6, 6-0, 12-10 |
| 1949 | (India) Khan-Iftikhar Ahmed | (Dominion of Ceylon) Fred J. de Saram | 6-2, 9-7, 6-3 |
| 1950 | (Dominion of Ceylon) Fred J. de Saram | (Australia) Ian Occleshaw | 2-6, 6-3, 6-3, 6-4 |
| 1951 | (India) Khan-Iftikhar Ahmed | (India) Naresh Kumar | 6-4, 6-4, 6-4 |
| 1952 | (Dominion of Ceylon) Lovell Ernst | (Dominion of Ceylon) Conroy Gunasekera | 6-4, 6-3, 6-4 |
| 1953 | (Australia) Jack Arkinstall | (India) Khan-Iftikhar Ahmed | 6-3, 6-0, 9-7 |
| 1954 | (Sweden) Lennart Bergelin | (Sweden) Staffan Stockenberg | 6-4, 6-4 |
| 1955 | (Poland) Władysław Skonecki | (Australia) Clive Wilderspin | 6-1, 10-8, 6-4 |
| 1956 | (India) Ramanathan Krishnan | (Australia) Jack Arkinstall | 9-7, 6-0, 6-1 |
| 1957 | (Dominion of Ceylon) Rupert Ferdinands | (Dominion of Ceylon) Bernard Pinto | |
| 1958 | (India) Sumant Misra | (Dominion of Ceylon) Rupert Ferdinands | 3-6, 6-1, 7-5, 7-5 |
| 1959 | (India) Sumant Misra | (Dominion of Ceylon) Bernard Pinto | 6-3, 6-0, 2-6, 6-4 |
| 1960 | (India) Akhtar Ali | (India) Sumant Misra | |
| 1961 | (Dominion of Ceylon) Senaka Kumara | (India) Vishnu Mohan | |
| 1962 | (India) Akhtar Ali | (India) V. R. Balasubramaniam | |
| 1963 | (Dominion of Ceylon) Rupert Ferdinands | (Dominion of Ceylon) Bernard Pinto | 6-3, 5-7, 4-6, 6-3, 6-2 |
| 1964 | (India) Ravi Venkatesan | (India) Shyam Minotra | 7-5, 6-3, 5-7, 6-0 |
| 1965 | (Indonesia) Sei Ni Si | (Dominion of Ceylon) Bernard Pinto | 6-8, 2-6, 6-3, 6-2, 6-3 |
| 1966 | (Dominion of Ceylon) Bernard Pinto | (Dominion of Ceylon) Senaka Kumara | 8-6, 6-3, 6-2 |
| 1967 | (West Germany) Harald Elschenbroich | (Mexico) Jesus Hernandez | 6-2, 3-6, 6-3, 6-4 |
| 1968 | (India) Anand Amritraj | (India) Shyam Minotra | 7-5, 6-3, 6-1 |
| 1969 | (Dominion of Ceylon) Rupert Ferdinands | (India) Shiv-Prakash Misra | 4-6, 2-6, 6-4, 8-6, 6-1 |
| 1970 | (Dominion of Ceylon) Rupert Ferdinands | (India) Sumant Misra | 6-3, 6-8, 6-4 |
| 1971 | (India) Anand Amritraj | (India) Ravi Venkatesan | 7-5, 6-2, 2-6, 7-5 |
| 1972 | (India) Ravi Venkatesan | (Thailand) Somparn Champisri | 6-0, 2-6, 9-7, 5-7, 6-2 |
| 1973 | (Sri Lanka) Senaka Kumara | (Sri Lanka) Lassantha Fernando | 7-5, 6-1, 6-4 |
| 1974 | (Pakistan) Saeed Meer | (Pakistan) Meer Mohammed Khan | 6-4, 6-4 |
| 1975 | (Sri Lanka) Lassantha Fernando | (India) Gopal Bhupathi | |
| 1976 | (Pakistan) Jamil Ahmed | (Sri Lanka) Everard De Silva | 6-2, 6-2, 6-3 |

== See also ==
- Category:National and multi-national tennis tournaments
