= Somparn Champisri =

Thai tennis player

- Country (sports): Thailand
- Born: 18 January 1943 (age 83)
- Plays: Left-handed

Singles
- Career record: 2-4 (Davis Cup)
- Career titles: 5

Doubles
- Career record: 1-3 (Davis Cup)

Somparn Champisri (Thai: สมภาร จำปีศรี; born 18 January 1943) is a Thai former tennis player active in the 1960s and 1970s.

== Career ==
Champisri, a team silver medalist at the 1966 Asian Games, also won numerous Southeast Asian Games medals for Thailand. He is the only Thai man to win three Southeast Asian Games singles gold medals (1965, 1971 & 1973).

In 1964 he was a finalist at the Bangkok Championships losing to Seri Charuchinda. In 1966 he won the singles title at the Malayan Championships held in Ipoh, Malaysia. In 1971 he won the Singapore International Championships against Filipino player Eddie Cruz. In 1972 he was a losing finalist to Ravi Venkatesa at the Ceylon Championships held in Colombo.

A left-handed player, Champisri competed for the Thailand Davis Cup team from 1976 to 1978.
