= Hossein Akbari =

Iranian tennis player (born 1950)

Mohammad Hossein Akbari
- Country (sports): Iran
- Born: 1950 (age 74–75); Tehran, Iran
- Plays: Right-handed

Singles
- Career record: 1-3
- Career titles: 0
- Highest ranking: No. 318 (20 December 1974)

Grand Slam singles results
- French Open: 1R (1969)

Doubles
- Career record: 0-3
- Career titles: 0
- Highest ranking: n/a

Grand Slam doubles results
- French Open: 1R (1969)

Mohammad Hossein Akbari (born 1950) is a former tennis player from Iran.

== Career ==
He was introduced to Tennis at age of 6. His first Tennis competitive match was in 1961 where he defeated Iran's runner up Nemat Nemati. At age of 16 he became the first Iranian to compete at 1966 Wimbledon Juniors. In 1967 he competed at the Orange Bowl. He was Iran's champion in 1973, 1974 and 1979.

From 1967 to 1978, Akbari took part in Davis Cup campaigns for Iran.

Akbari competed in the 1969 French Open played in both Men's singles and Men's doubles and lost in the opening round. In Men's doubles he partnered his brother Taghi Akbari.

He was coach of Iran's tennis team seniors as well as Juniors from 1993 to 1994.

His highest singles rank was 318 (20 December 1974).
