= Alexander Marcial =

Filipino tennis player (born 1949)

- Country (sports): Philippines
- Born: 30 March 1949 (age 76)
- Plays: Right-handed

Singles
- Career record: 1–7
- Highest ranking: No. 262 (29 July 1974)

Doubles
- Career record: 3–7
Medal record
Southeast Asian Games
Gold medal – first place	1981 Manila	Men's doubles
Gold medal – first place	1981 Manila	Mixed doubles
Silver medal – second place	1983 Singapore	Men's team
Bronze medal – third place	1981 Manila	Men's team

Alexander Marcial (born 30 March 1949) is a Filipino former professional tennis player.

Marcial was a Davis Cup player for the Philippines between 1969 and 1982, featuring in a total of 11 ties, for wins in three singles and five doubles rubbers. At the 1981 Southeast Asian Games in Manila, Marcial claimed gold medals in both the men's doubles and mixed doubles events. On the professional tour he had a best singles world ranking of 262, which he reached in 1974.
