= Kenichi Hirai =

Japanese tennis player (born 1950)

- Country (sports): Japan
- Born: 19 March 1950 (age 76) Tokyo, Japan

Singles
- Career titles: 7–31
- Highest ranking: No. 180 (29 July 1974)

Grand Slam singles results
- Australian Open: 1R (1974, 1975)
- Wimbledon: 2R (1976)
- US Open: 1R (1971)

Doubles
- Career record: 14–41

Grand Slam doubles results
- Australian Open: 2R (1974)
- French Open: QF (1974)
- Wimbledon: 1R (1973, 1974, 1975)
- US Open: 1R (1971)
Medal record
Representing Japan
Asian Games
| Gold medal – first place | 1974 Tehran | Doubles |
Summer Universiade
| Silver medal – second place | 1973 Moscow | Mixed doubles |
| Bronze medal – third place | 1973 Moscow | Singles |

Kenichi Hirai (平井健一, Hirai Ken'ichi; born 19 March 1950) is a Japanese former professional tennis player.

== Biography ==
Hirai, who was born in Tokyo, was a six-time doubles champion at the All Japan Tennis Championships.

Debuting in 1973, Hirai featured in a total 19 Davis Cup ties for Japan and won 21 matches overall, 11 in singles and 10 in doubles.

Hirai won two medals at the 1973 Summer Universiade in Moscow, a bronze in the singles and silver in the mixed doubles.

In 1974 he became the Asian Games doubles champion with Toshiro Sakai and teamed up with the same player to reach the quarter-finals of the French Open that year.

Hirai didn't turn professional until the late 1970s.

== Grand Prix career finals ==
=== Doubles: 1 (0–1) ===
| Result | W/L | Date | Tournament | Surface | Partner | Opponents | Score |
|---|---|---|---|---|---|---|---|
| Loss | 0–1 | Jul 1974 | Düsseldorf, West Germany | Clay | (Japan) Toshiro Sakai | (Czechoslovakia) Jiří Hřebec (Czechoslovakia) Jan Kodeš | 1–6, 4–6 |

== See also ==
- List of Japan Davis Cup team representatives
