= Toshiro Sakai =

Japanese tennis player (born 1947)

- Country (sports): (Japan)
- Born: 23 November 1947 (age 78) Tokyo, Japan
- Plays: Right-handed
- Coach: Don Tregonning

Singles
- Career record: 26–36
- Career titles: 0
- Highest ranking: No. 75 (15 October 1973)

Grand Slam singles results
- Australian Open: 2R (1968)
- French Open: 3R (1974)
- Wimbledon: 3R (1973)
- US Open: 3R (1971)

Doubles
- Career titles: 0

Grand Slam doubles results
- Australian Open: 2R (1968)
- French Open: QF (1974)
- Wimbledon: 2R (1973)
- US Open: 1R (1971, 1972)
Medal record
Summer Universiade
Gold medal – first place	1970 Turin	Men's doubles
Asian Games
Gold medal – first place	1974 Tehran	Men's singles
Gold medal – first place	1974 Tehran	Men's doubles
Gold medal – first place	1974 Tehran	Men's team

Toshiro Sakai (坂井利郎, Sakai Toshirō; born 23 November 1947) is a former tennis player from Japan.

== Career ==
Sakai, a student of Waseda University, competed in the 1970 Summer Universiade, which was held in Turin, Italy. He and Jun Kamiwazumi won the doubles gold medal for Japan.

When the Japanese Davis Cup side upset Australia in 1971, Sakai played a large role, winning both of his matches, over Colin Dibley and the deciding fifth rubber against John Cooper. Sakai made the third round of the 1971 US Open, beating Vitas Gerulaitis and Ross Case.

In 1972, Sakai was semi-finalist in the U.S. Men's Clay Court Championships.

At Wimbledon in 1973, Sakai was eliminated in the third round by Ilie Năstase, having earlier secured wins over Frew McMillan and Hans Kary. In Osaka later that year, he beat Željko Franulović in the semi-finals to make it into his first Grand Prix final, which he lost to Ken Rosewall. In 1973 he also managed to defeat John Newcombe in a Davis Cup match.

He had his best Grand Slam performance at the 1974 French Open, where he reached the third round of the singles draw and was a quarter-finalist in the men's doubles, with Kenichi Hirai. The same player partnered Sakai in the Düsseldorf Grand Prix tournament that year and the pair finished as runners-up. Sakai and Hirai also won the men's doubles gold medal at the 1974 Asian Games in Tehran. It was Sakai's second gold medal of the tournament, having also won a gold medal in the singles, beating Iranian local Taghi Akbari in the final.

In 1975, Sakai made his final Davis Cup appearances for Japan and registered his 20th and final win, over Phil Dent. He took part in a total of 19 ties during his career.

== Performance timeline ==
Key
W	F	SF	QF	#R	RR	Q#	DNQ	A	NH

(W) winner; (F) finalist; (SF) semifinalist; (QF) quarterfinalist; (#R) rounds 4, 3, 2, 1; (RR) round-robin stage; (Q#) qualification round; (DNQ) did not qualify; (A) absent; (NH) not held; (SR) strike rate (events won / competed); (W–L) win–loss record.

=== Singles ===
Tournament	1968	1969	1970	1971	1972	1973	1974	W–L	Win %
Grand Slam tournaments
Australian Open								0–0	–
French Open								0–0	–
Wimbledon								0–0	–
US Open								0–0	–
Win–loss								0–0	–

== Career finals ==
=== Singles: 1 (0–2) ===
Result	W/L	Date	Tournament	Surface	Opponent	Score
Loss	0–1	Oct 1973	Osaka, Japan	Hard	(Australia) Ken Rosewall	2–6, 4–6
Loss	0–2	Dec 1974	Hobart, Australia	Hard	(Australia) Geoff Masters	4–6, 6–7

=== Doubles: 1 (0–1) ===
Result	W/L	Date	Tournament	Surface	Partner	Opponents	Score
Loss	0–1	Jul 1974	Düsseldorf, Germany	Clay	(Japan) Kenichi Hirai	(Czechoslovakia) Jiří Hřebec (Czechoslovakia) Jan Kodeš	1–6, 4–6
