= Saeed Meer =

Pakistani tennis player

- Country (sports): Pakistan
- Residence: Pakistan
- Born: 25 November 1947 (age 78) Meerut, India
- Height: N/A
- Turned pro: 1968
- Retired: 1980
- Plays: Right-handed
- Prize money: N/A

Singles
- Career record: 164–80
- Career titles: 4
- Highest ranking: No. 235 (8 April 1975)

Grand Slam singles results
- Wimbledon: First Round

Doubles
- Career record: 0–12
- Career titles: 0
- Highest ranking: N/A
- Last updated on: 24 June 2007.

Saeed Meer, (born 25 November 1947, in Meerut), the former Pakistan No. 2 tennis player, had a successful Davis Cup career, with a 26–14 win–loss record.

== Career ==
Meer played his first tournament at the East of England Championships in 1968. In April 1972 he won his first tournament at the Karachi Open against Meer Mohammed Khan. In the summer of 1972 he was touring in Great Britain and won the West Warwickshire Open at Solihull, England against the Nigerian player Thompson Onibokun. In 1973, he made it to the second round at the Welsh Championships in Newport, United Kingdom he also went on to play at Seattle and Fort Worth in the United States. The following year, he played at Louisville, US. In 1974, he made it to the second round of the Wimbledon singles. Also that year he won the Ceylon Championships at Nuwara Eliya.

Meer, also twice made it to the first round doubles of the US Open, once at the Australian Open, the French Open and Wimbledon. In the mixed doubles, he made it to the second round of the US Open and second round of Wimbledon. In 1976, Saeed Meer played at the Iranian International Championships in Tehran. In 1977 he won the East of England Championships at Felixstowe against Ali Kahn. His final ATP tournament was at the Western Australian Open at Perth, Australia, in 1980, being knocked out in the first round.

He currently coaches at the Beach View Club, Sea View in Karachi, Pakistan.
