= Yehoshua Shalem =

Israeli tennis player

- Native name: יהושע שלם
- Country (sports): Israel
- Born: 1 August 1944 (age 80)
- Plays: Right-handed

Singles
- Career record: 5–15 (Davis Cup)

Doubles
- Career record: 0–1 (Davis Cup)
Medal record
Asian Games
Bronze medal – third place	1974 Tehran	Men's singles

Yehoshua Shalem (Hebrew: יהושע שלם; born 1 August 1944) is an Israeli former professional tennis player.

Often referred to by his childhood nickname "Shuka", Shalem was raised in the Jerusalem neighbourhood Rehavia. His father, an immigrant from Thessaloniki, had been a tennis player good enough to win the Palestinian championship.

Shalem was the Israeli national singles champion nine successive times between 1967 and 1975. In addition he won the Israel International Championship in 1974, becoming the first local to win in 12 years. He represented the Israel Davis Cup team in a total of 10 ties and was a singles bronze medalist for Israel at the 1974 Asian Games in Tehran.

== See also ==
- List of Israel Davis Cup team representatives
