= Ali Madani =

Iranian tennis player

- Country (sports): Iran
- Plays: Right-handed

Singles
- Career record: 1-6
- Career titles: 0
- Highest ranking: No. 266 (16 January 1978)

Doubles
- Career record: 0-6
- Career titles: 0
- Highest ranking: No. 727 (16 July 1984)

Grand Slam doubles results
- US Open: 1R (1979)

Ali Madani
Medal record

Men's Tennis

Asian Games
Silver medal – second place	1974 Tehran	Men's Doubles

Ali Madani is a former tennis player from Iran.

== Career ==
Madani took part Davis Cup campaigns for Iran.

Madani competed in Men's doubles at the 1979 US Open where he partnered Mike Myburg but were beaten by Steve Docherty and John James in the first round.

He won the silver medal in Men's Tennis Doubles partnering Kambiz Derafshijavan at the 1974 Asian Games in Tehran.

His highest single record was 266 (16 January 1978).
