= Taghi Akbari =

Iranian tennis player (born 1972)

- Country (sports): Iran
- Born: 14 December 1945 (age 79); Tehran, Pahlavi Iran
- Plays: Right-handed

Singles
- Career record: 25-21
- Career titles: 1
- Highest ranking: No. 146 (3 June 1974)

Grand Slam singles results
- French Open: 1R (1969)
- Wimbledon: 1R (1967)

Doubles
- Career record: 0-4
- Career titles: 0
- Highest ranking: n/a

Grand Slam doubles results
- French Open: 1R (1969)
Medal record
Asian Games
Silver medal – second place	1974 Tehran	Men's Singles
Bronze medal – third place	1966 Bangkok	Men's Singles
Bronze medal – third place	1966 Bangkok	Men's Team

Taghi Akbari (Persian: تقی اکبری; born 1945) is an Iranian former tennis player.

== Career ==
Akbari was a member of Iran Davis Cup team from 1958 to 1975, where he was captain since 1974. He appeared at 15 Davis Cup campaigns for Iran, which is a national record. His 17 singles wins is also an Iranian Davis Cup record, that was equaled by Anoosha Shahgholi in 2011. He also won three doubles rubbers during his career.

In 1962 he was a quarter-finalist at the Lebanon International Championships. His only career singles title win came at the Lebanese National Championships held in Brummana, Lebanon in 1965. In 1966 he reached the quarter-finals of the Philippines Championships.

He won a bronze medal in the men's singles event at the 1966 Asian Games and a silver medal at the 1974 Asian Games, where he lost in the gold medal playoff to Toshiro Sakai. In 1966 he was a semi-finalist at the Iranian International Championships in Tehran, where he lost to Bob Hewitt.

Akbari managed to qualify for the 1967 Wimbledon Championships but was beaten by Sergei Likhachev in the first round. He is the first Iranian Tennis player who played at Roland Garros without having had to play any qualification rounds. He competed in the 1969 French Open and lost again in the opening round, but did manage to take Phil Dent into a fifth set. His brother, Mohammad Hossein Akbari, also played in the 1969 French Open. The same year he reached the quarter-finals of the All India Hard Court Championships.

Akbari received Davis Cup Commitment Award for his 15 years honorific representing his country in Davis Cup.

He is Iran's all-time highest-ranked player, ranking 146 (3 June 1974).
