= Yair Wertheimer =

Israeli tennis player

- Native name: יאיר ורטהיימר
- Country (sports): Israel
- Residence: Israel
- Born: 3 November 1955 (age 70)

Yair Wertheimer (Hebrew: יאיר ורטהיימר, also known as Meir Wertheimer; born 3 November 1955) is an Israeli former tennis player.

== Tennis career ==
Beginning in 1972, Wertheimer played for the Israeli Davis Cup team and had a 6-4 record in singles and a 5-6 record in doubles.

In 1978, while ranked No. 1 in Israel, he went to the United States, on tennis scholarship from the University of California, Berkeley, where he studied Business Administration and played for the tennis team.

In 1997, he won the over-35 seniors tournament at Hapoel Tel Aviv.

== ILTF circuit finals ==
=== Singles (1 runners-up) ===
Result	Year	Tournament	Opponent	Score
Loss	1972	Hampshire Tennis Championships	(United Kingdom) Richard A. Leslie	5–7, 1–6
