= 1988 Davis Cup Africa Zone Group II =

International tennis competition

The Europe/Africa Zone is one of the three zones of the regional Davis Cup competition in 1988.

In the Europe/Africa Zone there are two different tiers, called groups, in which teams compete against each other to advance to the upper tier. The winner in the Africa Zone Group II advanced to the Europe/Africa Zone Group I in 1989.

== Participating nations ==
- Algeria
- Cameroon
- Egypt
- Ghana
- Ivory Coast
- Kenya
- Morocco
- Tunisia
- Zimbabwe

=== Draw ===
First round 5–7 February
Zimbabwe
bye
bye
Cameroon
Algeria
bye
bye
Ivory Coast
Tunisia
bye
bye
Morocco
Accra, Ghana (indoor carpet)
Ghana | 1
Kenya | 4
bye
Egypt

Second Round; 8–10 April
Harare, Zimbabwe (indoor hard)
Zimbabwe | 5
Cameroon | 0
Abidjan, Ivory Coast (hard)
Algeria | 2
Ivory Coast | 3
Tunis, Tunisia (hard)
Tunisia | 0
Morocco | 5
Cairo, Egypt (clay)
Kenya | 0
Egypt | 5

Third Round; 6–8 May
Abidjan, Ivory Coast (hard)
Zimbabwe | 3
Ivory Coast | 2
Casablanca, Morocco (clay)
Morocco | 2
Egypt | 3

Third Round; 22–24 July
Harare, Zimbabwe (indoor hard)
Zimbabwe | 5
Egypt | 0

- Zimbabwe are promoted to Group I in 1989.

== First round ==
=== Ghana vs. Kenya ===
Ghana
1
Accra, Ghana
5–7 February 1988
Carpet (indoors)

Kenya
4

| | | | 1 | 2 | 3 | 4 | 5 |
|---|---|---|---|---|---|---|---|
| 1 | (Ghana) (Kenya) | Franklyn Ofori; Eno Polo | 6; 4 | 0; 6 | 0; 6 | 7; 9 |
| 2 | (Ghana) (Kenya) | Kojo Atiso; Paul Wekesa | 4; 6 | 2; 6 | 1; 6 |
| 3 | (Ghana) (Kenya) | Kojo Atiso / Kenneth Dowuona; Eno Polo / Paul Wekesa | 6; 8 | 1; 6 | 2; 6 |
| 4 | (Ghana) (Kenya) | Franklyn Ofori; Norbert Oduor | 6; 3 | 11; 9 | 6; 4 |
| 5 | (Ghana) (Kenya) | Kojo Atiso; Eno Polo | 3; 6 | 6; 4 | 3; 6 | 3; 6 |

== Second round ==
=== Zimbabwe vs. Cameroon ===
Zimbabwe
5
City Sports Centre, Harare, Zimbabwe
8–10 April 1988
Hard (indoors)

Cameroon
0

| | | | 1 | 2 | 3 | 4 | 5 |
|---|---|---|---|---|---|---|---|
| 1 | (Zimbabwe) (Cameroon) | Haroon Ismail; Pierre Moudourou | 6; 4 | 6; 4 | 6; 1 |
| 2 | (Zimbabwe) (Cameroon) | Greig Rodger; Zacharie Moungnol | 6; 0 | 6; 2 | 11; 9 |
| 3 | (Zimbabwe) (Cameroon) | Graham Martin / Greig Rodger; Lionel Kemajou / Pierre Moudourou | 6; 3 | 6; 4 | 6; 4 |
| 4 | (Zimbabwe) (Cameroon) | Greig Rodger; Pierre Moudourou | 6; 3 | 6; 2 |
| 5 | (Zimbabwe) (Cameroon) | Haroon Ismail; Zacharie Moungnol | 6; 4 | 6; 2 |

=== Ivory Coast vs. Algeria ===
Ivory Coast
3
Hôtel Ivoire, Abidjan, Ivory Coast
8–10 April 1988
Hard

Algeria
2

| | | | 1 | 2 | 3 | 4 | 5 |
|---|---|---|---|---|---|---|---|
| 1 | (Ivory Coast) (Algeria) | Clément N'Goran; Reda Galou | 6; 3 | 7; 5 | 8; 10 | 6; 2 |
| 2 | (Ivory Coast) (Algeria) | Antoine Beugré; Djamel Boudjemline | 6; 3 | 6; 2 | 3; 6 | 6; 3 |
| 3 | (Ivory Coast) (Algeria) | Jean-Amihiaka Koffi / Jean-Jacques Kouassi; Djamel Boudjemline / Reda Galou | 4; 6 | 7; 5 | 4; 6 | 6; 8 |
| 4 | (Ivory Coast) (Algeria) | Clément N'Goran; Djamel Boudjemline | 6; 0 | 6; 3 | 6; 0 |
| 5 | (Ivory Coast) (Algeria) | Antoine Beugré; Reda Galou | 0; 6 | 2; 6 |

=== Tunisia vs. Morocco ===
Tunisia
0
Tunis, Tunisia
8–10 April 1988
Hard

Morocco
5

| | | | 1 | 2 | 3 | 4 | 5 |
|---|---|---|---|---|---|---|---|
| 1 | (Tunisia) (Morocco) | Adel Brahim; Arafat Chekrouni | 4; 6 | 1; 6 | 6; 4 | 1; 6 |
| 2 | (Tunisia) (Morocco) | Mehdi Ben Ismail; Khalid Outaleb | 1; 6 | 1; 6 | 1; 6 |
| 3 | (Tunisia) (Morocco) | Mehdi Ben Ismail / Adel Brahim; Arafat Chekrouni / Khalid Outaleb | 3; 6 | 4; 6 | 0; 6 |
| 4 | (Tunisia) (Morocco) | Hatem Debbeche; Mohammed Dlimi | 3; 6 | 6; 4 | 0; 6 |
| 5 | (Tunisia) (Morocco) | Adel Brahim; Houcine Saber | 3; 6 | 3; 6 |

=== Egypt vs. Kenya ===
Egypt
5
Cairo, Egypt
8–10 April 1988
Clay

Kenya
0

| | | | 1 | 2 | 3 | 4 | 5 |
|---|---|---|---|---|---|---|---|
| 1 | (Egypt) (Kenya) | Ahmed El-Mehelmy; Asif Karim | 6; 1 | 6; 3 | 6; 1 |
| 2 | (Egypt) (Kenya) | Hisham Nasser; Kush Bhardwaj | 6; 2 | 6; 2 | 6; 0 |
| 3 | (Egypt) (Kenya) | Ahmed El-Mehelmy / Hisham Nasser; Kush Bhardwaj / Asif Karim | 6; 3 | 9; 11 | 6; 3 | 6; 3 |
| 4 | (Egypt) (Kenya) | Hisham Nasser; Asif Karim | 6; 2 | 6; 2 |
| 5 | (Egypt) (Kenya) | Hassan El Aroussy; Kush Bhardwaj | 6; 3 | 6; 2 |

== Third round ==
=== Ivory Coast vs. Zimbabwe ===
Ivory Coast
2
Hôtel Ivoire, Abidjan, Ivory Coast
6–8 May 1988
Hard

Zimbabwe
3

| | | | 1 | 2 | 3 | 4 | 5 |
|---|---|---|---|---|---|---|---|
| 1 | (Ivory Coast) (Zimbabwe) | Clément N'Goran; Byron Black | 6; 3 | 9; 7 | 1; 6 | 6; 1 |
| 2 | (Ivory Coast) (Zimbabwe) | Antoine Beugré; Greig Rodger | 4; 6 | 4; 6 | 10; 12 |
| 3 | (Ivory Coast) (Zimbabwe) | Jean-Jacques Kouassi / Clément N'Goran; Byron Black / Philip Tuckniss | 8; 10 | 2; 6 | 2; 6 |
| 4 | (Ivory Coast) (Zimbabwe) | Antoine Beugré; Byron Black | 1; 6 | 2; 6 | 1; 6 |
| 5 | (Ivory Coast) (Zimbabwe) | Clément N'Goran; Greig Rodger | 6; 2 | 6; 3 |

=== Morocco vs. Egypt ===
Morocco
2
Casablanca, Morocco
6–8 May 1988
Clay

Egypt
3

| | | | 1 | 2 | 3 | 4 | 5 |
|---|---|---|---|---|---|---|---|
| 1 | (Morocco) (Egypt) | Houcine Saber; Ahmed El-Mehelmy | 1; 6 | 3; 6 | 2; 6 |
| 2 | (Morocco) (Egypt) | Arafat Chekrouni; Hisham Nasser | 6; 1 | 6; 1 | 6; 2 |
| 3 | (Morocco) (Egypt) | Arafat Chekrouni / Mohammed Dlimi; Ahmed El-Mehelmy / Hisham Nasser | 6; 3 | 6; 3 | 4; 6 | 4; 6 | 5; 7 |
| 4 | (Morocco) (Egypt) | Arafat Chekrouni; Ahmed El-Mehelmy | 3; 6 | 0; 6 | 6; 3 | 2; 6 |
| 5 | (Morocco) (Egypt) | Mohammed Dlimi; Hisham Nasser | 6; 3 | 6; 3 |

== Fourth round ==
=== Zimbabwe vs. Egypt ===
Zimbabwe
5
City Sports Centre, Harare, Zimbabwe
22–24 July 1988
Hard (indoors)

Egypt
0

| | | | 1 | 2 | 3 | 4 | 5 |
|---|---|---|---|---|---|---|---|
| 1 | (Zimbabwe) (Egypt) | Byron Black; Tamer El-Sawy | 6; 4 | 6; 3 | 8; 6 |
| 2 | (Zimbabwe) (Egypt) | Orlando Lourenco; Hassan El Aroussy | 6; 2 | 6; 1 | 6; 1 |
| 3 | (Zimbabwe) (Egypt) | Byron Black / Philip Tuckniss; Tamer El-Sawy / Hisham Nasser | 6; 1 | 6; 2 | 6; 2 |
| 4 | (Zimbabwe) (Egypt) | Orlando Lourenco; Tamer El-Sawy | 6; 4 | 6; 1 | 10; 8 |
| 5 | (Zimbabwe) (Egypt) | Byron Black; Hassan El Aroussy | 6; 2 | 6; 1 | 6; 1 |
