= 1986 Davis Cup Africa Zone =

International tennis competition

The Africa Zone served as a qualifying round to the 1986 Davis Cup Europe Zone.

Teams from 9 African nations competed for 2 places in the Europe Zone main draws. Zimbabwe and Nigeria were the winners of the Africa Zone and qualified for the Europe Zone main draws.

== Participating nations ==
- Algeria
- Ivory Coast
- Kenya
- Libya
- Morocco
- Nigeria
- Senegal
- Tunisia
- Zimbabwe

=== Draw ===
First round 17–19 January
Zimbabwe
bye
bye
Libya
Morocco
bye
bye
Kenya
Tunis, Tunisia (clay)
Nigeria	5
Tunisia	0
bye
Senegal
Ivory Coast
bye
bye
Algeria

Second Round; 7–9 March
Harare, Zimbabwe (hard)
Zimbabwe	5
Libya	0
Casablanca, Morocco (hard)
Morocco	3
Kenya	2
Dakar, Senegal (hard)
Nigeria	4
Senegal	1
Algiers, Algeria (clay)
Ivory Coast	0
Algeria	5

Third Round; 3–6 April
Harare, Zimbabwe (hard)
Zimbabwe	4
Morocco	1
Algiers, Algeria (clay)
Nigeria	3
Algeria	2

== First round ==
=== Tunisia vs. Nigeria ===
Tunisia
0
Club Tennis de Tunis, Tunis, Tunisia
17–19 January 1986
Clay

Nigeria
5

			1	2	3	4	5
1	(Tunisia) (Nigeria)	Jilani Bouhafa; Nduka Odizor	4; 6	1; 6	2; 6
2	(Tunisia) (Nigeria)	Karim Fliss; Tony Mmoh	1; 6	2; 6	2; 6
3	(Tunisia) (Nigeria)	Jilani Bouhafa / Karim Fliss; Tony Mmoh / Nduka Odizor	1; 6	1; 6	1; 6
4	(Tunisia) (Nigeria)	Elias Bramly; Nduka Odizor	3; 6	2; 6
5	(Tunisia) (Nigeria)	Jilani Bouhafa; Tony Mmoh	0; 6	0; 6

== Second round ==
=== Zimbabwe vs. Libya ===
Zimbabwe
5
Old Hararians, Harare, Zimbabwe
7–9 March 1986
Hard

Libya
0

			1	2	3	4	5
1	(Zimbabwe) (Libya)	Orlando Lourenco; Abdel-Monem Bornaz	6; 0	6; 1	6; 1
2	(Zimbabwe) (Libya)	Haroon Ismail; Saad El Ragig	6; 2	6; 2	6; 1
3	(Zimbabwe) (Libya)	Greig Rodger / Clive Wilson; Abdel-Monem Bornaz / Abdul-Hakim Jteli	6; 2	6; 0	6; 0
4	(Zimbabwe) (Libya)	Orlando Lourenco; Saad El Ragig	6; 0	6; 0	6; 0
5	(Zimbabwe) (Libya)	Haroon Ismail; Abdel-Monem Bornaz	6; 1	6; 0	6; 2

=== Morocco vs. Kenya ===
Morocco
3
Casablanca, Morocco
7–9 March 1986
Hard

Kenya
2

			1	2	3	4	5
1	(Morocco) (Kenya)	Arafat Chekrouni; Eno Polo	6; 1	6; 0	6; 2
2	(Morocco) (Kenya)	Houcine Saber; Paul Wekesa	6; 1	1; 6	5; 7	2; 6
3	(Morocco) (Kenya)	Mohammed Dlimi / Houcine Saber; Selim Rana / Paul Wekesa	7; 5	6; 2	4; 6	7; 9	6; 3
4	(Morocco) (Kenya)	Arafat Chekrouni; Paul Wekesa	6; 4	6; 2	5; 7	0; 6	3; 6
5	(Morocco) (Kenya)	Mohammed Dlimi; Eno Polo	6; 4	6; 4	6; 4

=== Senegal vs. Nigeria ===
Senegal
1
Sporting Club de Dakar, Dakar, Senegal
7–9 March 1986
Hard

Nigeria
4

			1	2	3	4	5
1	(Senegal) (Nigeria)	Yahiya Doumbia; David Imonitie	6; 4	6; 4	8; 6
2	(Senegal) (Nigeria)	Thierno Ly; Nduka Odizor	2; 6	3; 6	4; 6
3	(Senegal) (Nigeria)	Yahiya Doumbia / Thierno Ly; Sadiq Abdullahi / Nduka Odizor	6; 4	7; 9	5; 7	3; 6
4	(Senegal) (Nigeria)	Yahiya Doumbia; Nduka Odizor	1; 6	9; 7	2; 6	4; 6
5	(Senegal) (Nigeria)	Thierno Ly; Sadiq Abdullahi	4; 6	1; 6

=== Algeria vs. Ivory Coast ===
Algeria
5
Tennis Club Bachdjarah, Algiers, Algeria
7–9 March 1986
Clay

Ivory Coast
0

			1	2	3	4	5
1	(Algeria) (Ivory Coast)	Reda Galou; Clément N'Goran	8; 6	6; 8	8; 10	6; 3	6; 2
2	(Algeria) (Ivory Coast)	Djamel Boudjemline; Philippe Koffi	6; 0	6; 0	6; 2
3	(Algeria) (Ivory Coast)	Djamel Boudjemline / Reda Galou; Jean-Amihiaka Koffi / Clément N'Goran	6; 2	7; 9	6; 4	6; 3
4	(Algeria) (Ivory Coast)	Djamel Boudjemline; Clément N'Goran	6; 3	4; 6	6; 3
5	(Algeria) (Ivory Coast)	Reda Galou; Philippe Koffi	5; 7	6; 1	6; 4

== Third round ==
=== Zimbabwe vs. Morocco ===
Zimbabwe
4
Old Hararians, Harare, Zimbabwe
4–6 April 1986
Hard

Morocco
1

			1	2	3	4	5
1	(Zimbabwe) (Morocco)	Orlando Lourenco; Arafat Chekrouni	2; 6	1; 6	4; 6
2	(Zimbabwe) (Morocco)	Haroon Ismail; Abdel Nadini	7; 5	6; 1	6; 2
3	(Zimbabwe) (Morocco)	Haroon Ismail / Orlando Lourenco; Arafat Chekrouni / Mohammed Dlimi	6; 4	6; 4	6; 4
4	(Zimbabwe) (Morocco)	Haroon Ismail; Arafat Chekrouni	11; 9	4; 1				retired
5	(Zimbabwe) (Morocco)	Orlando Lourenco; Abdel Nadini	6; 3	6; 4

=== Algeria vs. Nigeria ===
Algeria
2
Tennis Club Bachdjarah, Algiers, Algeria
3–5 April 1986
Clay

Nigeria
3

			1	2	3	4	5
1	(Algeria) (Nigeria)	Djamel Boudjemline; Tony Mmoh	5; 7	2; 6	2; 6
2	(Algeria) (Nigeria)	Moncef Zehar; David Imonitie	6; 4	6; 3	4; 6	0; 6	6; 3
3	(Algeria) (Nigeria)	Yassine Amier / Abdel-Halim Azzi; David Imonitie / Tony Mmoh	1; 6	6; 8	1; 6
4	(Algeria) (Nigeria)	Djamel Boudjemline; David Imonitie	6; 1	6; 1	4; 6	6; 3
5	(Algeria) (Nigeria)	Moncef Zehar; Tony Mmoh	1; 6	2; 6	1; 6
