= 1987 Davis Cup Africa Zone =

International tennis competition

The Africa Zone served as a qualifying round to the 1987 Davis Cup Europe Zone.

Teams from 11 African nations competed for 2 places in the Europe Zone main draws. Zimbabwe and Senegal were the winners of the Africa Zone and qualified for the Europe Zone main draws.

== Participating nations ==
- Algeria
- Ivory Coast
- Djibouti
- Egypt
- Kenya
- Libya
- Morocco
- Nigeria
- Senegal
- Tunisia
- Zimbabwe

=== Draw ===
First round 30 January–1 February
Nigeria
bye
Abidjan, Ivory Coast (indoor carpet)
Tunisia	0
Ivory Coast	5
Zimbabwe
bye
Kenya	w/o
Djibouti
Dakar, Senegal (hard)
Morocco	2
Senegal	3
bye
Algeria
Libya
bye
bye
Egypt

Second Round; 13–22 March
Abidjan, Ivory Coast (indoor carpet)
Nigeria	3
Ivory Coast	2
Nairobi, Kenya (clay)
Zimbabwe	5
Kenya	0
Dakar, Senegal (hard)
Senegal	4
Algeria	1
Libya
Egypt	w/o

Third Round; 3–5 April
Harare, Zimbabwe (indoor hard)
Nigeria	2
Zimbabwe	3
Dakar, Senegal (hard)
Senegal	3
Egypt	2

== First round ==
=== Ivory Coast vs. Tunisia ===
Ivory Coast
5
Abidjan, Ivory Coast
30 January–1 February 1987
Carpet (indoors)

Tunisia
0

			1	2	3	4	5
1	(Ivory Coast) (Tunisia)	Clément N'Goran; Abdel-Majid Soudani	6; 2	6; 0	7; 5
2	(Ivory Coast) (Tunisia)	Antoine Beugré; Hassan Soudani	10; 8	6; 2	6; 1
3	(Ivory Coast) (Tunisia)	Jean-Amihiaka Koffi / Clément N'Goran; Abdel-Majid Soudani / Hassan Soudani	6; 2	6; 4	1; 6	7; 5
4	(Ivory Coast) (Tunisia)	Clément N'Goran; Elias Bramly	6; 1	6; 3
5	(Ivory Coast) (Tunisia)	Antoine Beugré; Adel Brahim	6; 3	6; 2

=== Senegal vs. Morocco ===
Senegal
3
Sporting Club de Dakar, Dakar, Senegal
30 January–1 February 1987
Hard

Morocco
2

			1	2	3	4	5
1	(Senegal) (Morocco)	Abou Berthé; Mohammed Dlimi	3; 6	6; 4	2; 6	4; 6
2	(Senegal) (Morocco)	Yahiya Doumbia; Abdel Nadini	7; 9	6; 8	6; 3	6; 3	6; 3
3	(Senegal) (Morocco)	Yahiya Doumbia / Thierno Ly; Arafat Chekrouni / Mohammed Dlimi	6; 3	6; 4	6; 4
4	(Senegal) (Morocco)	Abou Berthé; Abdel Nadini	2; 6	5; 7	6; 3	6; 3	2; 6
5	(Senegal) (Morocco)	Yahiya Doumbia; Mohammed Dlimi	3; 6	4; 6	6; 3	8; 6	6; 4

== Second round ==
=== Ivory Coast vs. Nigeria ===
Ivory Coast
2
Abidjan, Ivory Coast
13–15 March 1987
Carpet (indoors)

Nigeria
3

			1	2	3	4	5
1	(Ivory Coast) (Nigeria)	Clément N'Goran; Rotimi Akinloye	6; 8	6; 3	6; 4	6; 1
2	(Ivory Coast) (Nigeria)	Antoine Beugré; Tony Mmoh	1; 6	3; 6	4; 6
3	(Ivory Coast) (Nigeria)	Jean-Amihiaka Koffi / Clément N'Goran; John Atiomo / Tony Mmoh	9; 7	6; 1	2; 6	7; 9	13; 15
4	(Ivory Coast) (Nigeria)	Clément N'Goran; Tony Mmoh	3; 6	6; 3	5; 7	2; 6
5	(Ivory Coast) (Nigeria)	Antoine Beugré; Rotimi Akinloye	6; 2	4; 6	6; 4

=== Kenya vs. Zimbabwe ===
Kenya
0
Nairobi Club Ground, Nairobi, Kenya
13–15 March 1987
Clay

Zimbabwe
5

			1	2	3	4	5
1	(Kenya) (Zimbabwe)	Paul Wekesa; Byron Black	3; 6	4; 6	2; 6
2	(Kenya) (Zimbabwe)	Eno Polo; Greig Rodger	2; 6	5; 7	7; 5	4; 6
3	(Kenya) (Zimbabwe)	Kush Bhardwaj / Selim Rana; Byron Black / Haroon Ismail	3; 6	4; 6	3; 6
4	(Kenya) (Zimbabwe)	Eno Polo; Byron Black	3; 6	1; 6
5	(Kenya) (Zimbabwe)	Kush Bhardwaj; Greig Rodger	7; 9	2; 6

=== Senegal vs. Algeria ===
Senegal
4
Sporting Club de Dakar, Dakar, Senegal
20–22 March 1987
Hard

Algeria
1

			1	2	3	4	5
1	(Senegal) (Algeria)	Thierno Ly; Yassine Amier	5; 7	6; 2	6; 3	2; 6	6; 4
2	(Senegal) (Algeria)	Yahiya Doumbia; Djamel Boudjemline	6; 4	6; 0	6; 2
3	(Senegal) (Algeria)	Yahiya Doumbia / Thierno Ly; Yassine Amier / Djamel Boudjemline	6; 3	6; 2	8; 6
4	(Senegal) (Algeria)	Yahiya Doumbia; Yassine Amier	8; 6	6; 2
5	(Senegal) (Algeria)	Thierno Ly; Djamel Boudjemline	3; 6	7; 9

== Third round ==
=== Zimbabwe vs. Nigeria ===
Zimbabwe
3
City Sports Centre, Harare, Zimbabwe
3–5 April 1987
Hard (indoors)

Nigeria
2

			1	2	3	4	5
1	(Zimbabwe) (Nigeria)	Byron Black; Tony Mmoh	4; 6	1; 6	6; 4	6; 0	4; 2	retired
2	(Zimbabwe) (Nigeria)	Greig Rodger; Nduka Odizor	6; 8	6; 2	1; 6	2; 6
3	(Zimbabwe) (Nigeria)	Byron Black / Greig Rodger; Sadiq Abdullahi / Nduka Odizor	8; 6	6; 1	3; 6	6; 3
4	(Zimbabwe) (Nigeria)	Greig Rodger; Sadiq Abdullahi	3; 6	4; 6	4; 6
5	(Zimbabwe) (Nigeria)	Byron Black; Nduka Odizor	5; 7	6; 4	6; 3	6; 1

=== Senegal vs. Egypt ===
Senegal
3
Sporting Club de Dakar, Dakar, Senegal
3–5 April 1987
Hard

Egypt
2

			1	2	3	4	5
1	(Senegal) (Egypt)	Miloud Doumbia; Khaled Baligh	10; 12	9; 7	6; 4	0; 6	6; 8
2	(Senegal) (Egypt)	Yahiya Doumbia; Hisham Nasser	6; 3	6; 0	6; 0
3	(Senegal) (Egypt)	Abou Berthé / Yahiya Doumbia; Khaled Baligh / Hisham Nasser	6; 3	5; 7	6; 4	6; 3
4	(Senegal) (Egypt)	Miloud Doumbia; Hisham Nasser	5; 7	2; 6	2; 6
5	(Senegal) (Egypt)	Yahiya Doumbia; Khaled Baligh	6; 3	6; 4	6; 4
