= 1989 Davis Cup Africa Zone Group II =

International tennis competition

The Europe/Africa Zone was one of the three zones of the regional Davis Cup competition in 1989.

In the Europe/Africa Zone there were two different tiers, called groups, in which teams competed against each other to advance to the upper tier. The winner in the Africa Zone Group II advanced to the Europe/Africa Zone Group I in 1990.

== Participating nations ==
- Algeria
- Cameroon
- Egypt
- Ghana
- Ivory Coast
- Kenya
- Libya
- Morocco
- Tunisia

=== Draw ===
First round 3–5 February
Egypt
bye
bye
Ghana
Cameroon
bye
bye
Libya
Tunis, Tunisia (hard)
Algeria	5
Tunisia	0
bye
Morocco
Kenya
bye
bye
Ivory Coast

Second Round; 4–10 April
Accra, Ghana (hard)
Egypt	1
Ghana	4
Tripoli, Libya (hard)
Cameroon	5
Libya	0
Algiers, Algeria (clay)
Algeria	1
Morocco	3
Nairobi, Kenya (clay)
Kenya	3
Ivory Coast	2

Third Round; 16–18 June
Accra, Ghana (hard)
Ghana	4
Cameroon	1
Nairobi, Kenya (clay)
Morocco	5
Kenya	0

Third Round; 21–23 July
Accra, Ghana (hard)
Ghana	4
Morocco	1

- Ghana promoted to Group I in 1990.

== First round ==
=== Tunisia vs. Algeria ===
Tunisia
0
Tennis Club de Mégrine, Tunis, Tunisia
3–5 February 1989
Hard

Algeria
5

			1	2	3	4	5
1	(Tunisia) (Algeria)	Adel Brahim; Moncef Zehar	3; 6	4; 6	3; 6
2	(Tunisia) (Algeria)	Elias Bramly; Reda Galou	4; 6	4; 6	4; 6
3	(Tunisia) (Algeria)	Adel Brahim / Elias Bramly; Reda Galou / Moncef Zehar	2; 6	4; 6	1; 6
4	(Tunisia) (Algeria)	Elias Bramly; Moncef Zehar	4; 6	2; 6
5	(Tunisia) (Algeria)	Adel Brahim; Reda Galou	2; 6	2; 6

== Second round ==
=== Ghana vs. Egypt ===
Ghana
4
Accra Sports Stadium, Accra, Ghana
7–9 April 1989
Hard

Egypt
1

			1	2	3	4	5
1	(Ghana) (Egypt)	Kojo Atiso; Tamer El-Sawy	6; 4	6; 3	6; 3
2	(Ghana) (Egypt)	Franklyn Ofori; Ahmed El-Mehelmy	4; 6	0; 6	2; 6
3	(Ghana) (Egypt)	Kojo Atiso / Kenneth Dowuona; Ahmed El-Mehelmy / Tamer El-Sawy	6; 3	6; 3	6; 3
4	(Ghana) (Egypt)	Franklyn Ofori; Tamer El-Sawy	6^{3} 7^{7}	6^{5} 7^{7}	6; 2	6; 3	6; 4
5	(Ghana) (Egypt)	Kojo Atiso; Ahmed El-Mehelmy	6; 3	6; 4

=== Libya vs. Cameroon ===
Libya
0
Sports City Stadium, Tripoli, Libya
7–9 April 1989
Hard

Cameroon
5

			1	2	3	4	5
1	(Libya) (Cameroon)	Khaled Ezankouli; Jean-Yves Job	3; 6	0; 6	2; 6
2	(Libya) (Cameroon)	Abdul-Hakim Jteli; Zacharie Moungnol	2; 6	2; 6	0; 6
3	(Libya) (Cameroon)	Marjaa Assayed / Abdul-Hakim Jteli; Jean-Yves Job / Zacharie Moungnol	3; 6	7; 5	0; 6	3; 6
4	(Libya) (Cameroon)	Abdul-Hakim Jteli; Jean-Yves Job	6; 1	4; 6	5; 6
5	(Libya) (Cameroon)	Khaled Ezankouli; Zacharie Moungnol	3; 6	0; 3				retired

=== Algeria vs. Morocco ===
Algeria
1
Ben-Rouilah Stadium, Algiers, Algeria
4–6 April 1989
Clay

Morocco
3

			1	2	3	4	5
1	(Algeria) (Morocco)	Reda Galou; Arafat Chekrouni	6; 3	4; 6	6; 3	6; 3
2	(Algeria) (Morocco)	Moncef Zehar; Khalid Outaleb	6^{7} 7^{9}	6; 2	4; 6	1; 6
3	(Algeria) (Morocco)	Reda Galou / Moncef Zehar; Mohammed Dlimi / Khalid Outaleb	6^{4} 7^{7}	7^{7} 6^{3}	4; 6	2; 6
4	(Algeria) (Morocco)	Reda Galou; Khalid Outaleb	6^{5} 7^{7}	4; 6	6; 2	6^{4} 7^{7}
5	(Algeria) (Morocco)	Moncef Zehar; Arafat Chekrouni						not played

=== Kenya vs. Ivory Coast ===
Kenya
3
Nairobi Club Ground, Nairobi, Kenya
8–10 April 1989
Clay

Ivory Coast
2

			1	2	3	4	5
1	(Kenya) (Ivory Coast)	Norbert Oduor; Jean-Christophe Nabi	6; 4	4; 6	6^{5} 7^{7}	4; 6
2	(Kenya) (Ivory Coast)	Eno Polo; Jean-Jacques Kouassi	6; 2	6; 1	6; 1
3	(Kenya) (Ivory Coast)	Philip Ilako / Eno Polo; Isaac Beugré / Jean-Jacques Kouassi	6; 3	6; 4	6; 2
4	(Kenya) (Ivory Coast)	Eno Polo; Jean-Christophe Nabi	6; 0	6; 1	6; 1
5	(Kenya) (Ivory Coast)	Norbert Oduor; Jean-Jacques Kouassi	4; 6	6; 0	2; 6

== Third round ==
=== Ghana vs. Cameroon ===
Ghana
4
Accra Sports Stadium, Accra, Ghana
16–18 June 1989
Hard

Cameroon
1

			1	2	3	4	5
1	(Ghana) (Cameroon)	Kojo Atiso; Lionel Kemajou	6; 3	6; 4	4; 6	6; 4
2	(Ghana) (Cameroon)	Samson Ahinakwa; Jean-Yves Job	6; 3	3; 6	5; 7	6; 2	3; 6
3	(Ghana) (Cameroon)	Kojo Atiso / Kenneth Dowuona; Jules Ekono / Zacharie Moungnol	6; 3	6; 3	6; 3
4	(Ghana) (Cameroon)	Kojo Atiso; Jean-Yves Job	6; 4	6; 4	7; 5
5	(Ghana) (Cameroon)	Samson Ahinakwa; Lionel Kemajou	6; 4	6; 2

=== Kenya vs. Morocco ===
Kenya
0
Nairobi Club Ground, Nairobi, Kenya
16–18 June 1989
Clay

Morocco
5

			1	2	3	4	5
1	(Kenya) (Morocco)	Eno Polo; Arafat Chekrouni	7; 5	7^{7} 6^{1}	4; 6	4; 6	2; 6
2	(Kenya) (Morocco)	Norbert Oduor; Khalid Outaleb	0; 6	0; 6	3; 6
3	(Kenya) (Morocco)	Duncan Odipo / Peter Orwa; Mohammed Dlimi / Khalid Outaleb	2; 6	1; 6	1; 6
4	(Kenya) (Morocco)	Peter Orwa; Mohammed Ridaoui	1; 6	0; 6
5	(Kenya) (Morocco)	Eno Polo; Khalid Outaleb	3; 6	0; 1				retired

== Fourth round ==
=== Ghana vs. Morocco ===
Ghana
4
Accra Sports Stadium, Accra, Ghana
21–23 July 1989
Hard

Morocco
1

			1	2	3	4	5
1	(Ghana) (Morocco)	Franklyn Ofori; Abdel Nadini	6; 3	7^{7} 6^{0}	4; 6	6; 4
2	(Ghana) (Morocco)	Kojo Atiso; Khalid Outaleb	4; 6	4; 6	4; 6
3	(Ghana) (Morocco)	Franklyn Ofori / Emmanuel Paddi; Khalid Outaleb / Mohammed Ridaoui	7^{7} 6^{4}	6^{5} 7^{7}	7; 5	5; 7	6; 4
4	(Ghana) (Morocco)	Franklyn Ofori; Khalid Outaleb	6; 4	6; 4	3; 6	4; 6	7; 5
5	(Ghana) (Morocco)	Kojo Atiso; Abdel Nadini	6; 4	6^{3} 7^{7}	9; 7
