= 1984 Davis Cup Europe Zone =

International tennis competition

The Europe Zone was one of the three regional zones of the 1984 Davis Cup.

25 teams entered the Europe Zone in total, split across two sub-zones. The winner of each sub-zone was promoted to the following year's World Group.

The Soviet Union defeated Israel in the Zone A final, and Spain defeated Hungary in the Zone B final, resulting in both the Soviet Union and Spain being promoted to the 1985 World Group.

== Participating nations ==
Zone A:

- Austria
- Greece
- Israel
- Lebanon
- Monaco
- Norway
- Poland
- Portugal
- Senegal
- Soviet Union
- Switzerland
- Tunisia
- Zimbabwe

Zone B:

- Algeria
- Belgium
- Bulgaria
- Egypt
- Finland
- Hungary
- Ireland
- Luxembourg
- Morocco
- Netherlands
- Spain
- Turkey

== Zone A ==
=== Draw ===
First round 4–6 May
Soviet Union
bye
Monte Carlo, Monaco (clay)
Zimbabwe	1
Monaco	4
Austria	w/o
Lebanon
Oslo, Norway (clay)
Norway	4
Portugal	1
Warsaw, Poland (clay)
Greece	1
Poland	4
bye
Israel
Dakar, Senegal (hard)
Senegal	3
Tunisia	2
bye
Switzerland

Quarterfinals; 15–17 June
Jūrmala, Soviet Union (clay)
Soviet Union	5
Monaco	0
Vienna, Austria (clay)
Austria	5
Norway	0
Jerusalem, Israel (hard)
Poland	0
Israel	5
Disentis, Switzerland (clay)
Senegal	0
Switzerland	5

Semifinals; 13–21 July
Jūrmala, Soviet Union (clay)
Soviet Union	3
Austria	2
Ramat HaSharon, Israel (hard)
Israel	4
Switzerland	1

Final; 28–30 September
Donetsk, Soviet Union (clay)
Soviet Union	3
Israel	2

=== First round ===
==== Monaco vs. Zimbabwe ====
Monaco
4
Monte Carlo, Monaco
4–6 May 1984
Clay

Zimbabwe
1

			1	2	3	4	5
1	(Monaco) (Zimbabwe)	Albert Viviani; Haroon Ismail	7; 5	6; 2	6; 4
2	(Monaco) (Zimbabwe)	Bernard Balleret; Orlando Lourenco	6; 1	6; 2	3; 6	6; 1
3	(Monaco) (Zimbabwe)	Bernard Balleret / Jacques Vinciléoni; Haroon Ismail / Philip Tuckniss	2; 6	6; 4	2; 6	6; 3	7; 5
4	(Monaco) (Zimbabwe)	Albert Viviani; Orlando Lourenco	0; 6	4; 6
5	(Monaco) (Zimbabwe)	Bernard Balleret; Haroon Ismail	6; 2	6; 4

==== Norway vs. Portugal ====
Norway
4
Oslo, Norway
4–6 May 1984
Clay

Portugal
1

			1	2	3	4	5
1	(Norway) (Portugal)	Morten Rønneberg; João Cunha e Silva	6; 2	6; 3	2; 6	6; 0
2	(Norway) (Portugal)	Tony Jønsson; João Maio	6; 3	6; 2	6; 1
3	(Norway) (Portugal)	Terje Persson / Morten Rønneberg; João Maio / João Cunha e Silva	8; 6	6; 8	6; 3	6; 4
4	(Norway) (Portugal)	Morten Rønneberg; João Maio	6; 2	6; 3
5	(Norway) (Portugal)	Tony Jønsson; João Cunha e Silva	8; 6	0; 6	6; 4	4; 6	3; 6

==== Poland vs. Greece ====
Poland
4
Legia Warsaw, Warsaw, Poland
4–6 May 1984
Clay

Greece
1

			1	2	3	4	5
1	(Poland) (Greece)	Wojciech Fibak; Anastasios Bavelas	6; 1	6; 3	6; 4
2	(Poland) (Greece)	Waldemar Rogowski; George Kalovelonis	2; 6	3; 6	4; 6
3	(Poland) (Greece)	Wojciech Fibak / Wojciech Kowalski; Konstantinos Efraimoglou / George Kalovelonis	9; 7	6; 1	6; 2
4	(Poland) (Greece)	Wojciech Fibak; George Kalovelonis	6; 2	6; 2	4; 6	3; 6	6; 2
5	(Poland) (Greece)	Waldemar Rogowski; Anastasios Bavelas	6; 2	6; 4

==== Senegal vs. Tunisia ====
Senegal
3
Sporting Club de Dakar, Dakar, Senegal
4–6 May 1984
Hard

Tunisia
2

			1	2	3	4	5
1	(Senegal) (Tunisia)	Thierno Ly; Abdel-Majid Soudani	5; 7	6; 8	3; 6
2	(Senegal) (Tunisia)	Nagy Kabaz; Abdel-Aziz Zouhir	6; 8	6; 4	4; 6	6; 2	6; 4
3	(Senegal) (Tunisia)	Miloud Doumbia / Nagy Kabaz; Abdel-Majid Soudani / Hassan Soudani	3; 6	4; 6	6; 4	6; 3	6; 4
4	(Senegal) (Tunisia)	Thierno Ly; Abdel-Aziz Zouhir	6; 4	6; 2	6; 4
5	(Senegal) (Tunisia)	Nagy Kabaz; Abdel-Majid Soudani	6; 4	5; 7	1; 6

=== Quarterfinals ===
==== Soviet Union vs. Monaco ====
Soviet Union
5
Jūrmala, Soviet Union
15–17 June 1984
Clay

Monaco
0

			1	2	3	4	5
1	(Soviet Union) (Monaco)	Alexander Zverev; Gilles Ganancia	7; 5	6; 4	6; 2
2	(Soviet Union) (Monaco)	Andrei Chesnokov; Bernard Balleret	6; 1	8; 6	6; 0
3	(Soviet Union) (Monaco)	Sergey Leonyuk / Alexander Zverev; Bernard Balleret / Jacques Vinciléoni	8; 6	5; 7	6; 4	6; 0
4	(Soviet Union) (Monaco)	Alexander Zverev; Bernard Balleret	6; 2	8; 6
5	(Soviet Union) (Monaco)	Andrei Chesnokov; Gilles Ganancia	6; 2	6; 4

==== Austria vs. Norway ====
Austria
5
Wiener Park Club, Vienna, Austria
15–17 June 1984
Clay

Norway
0

			1	2	3	4	5
1	(Austria) (Norway)	Peter Feigl; Morten Rønneberg	6; 2	6; 3	6; 3
2	(Austria) (Norway)	Bernhard Pils; Tony Jønsson	6; 3	6; 0	6; 2
3	(Austria) (Norway)	Alex Antonitsch / Peter Feigl; Terje Persson / Morten Rønneberg	6; 3	6; 2	6; 1
4	(Austria) (Norway)	Bernhard Pils; Terje Persson	6; 1	6; 4
5	(Austria) (Norway)	Thomas Muster; Tony Jønsson	6; 0	6; 3

==== Israel vs. Poland ====
Israel
5
Jerusalem, Israel
15–17 June 1984
Hard

Poland
0

			1	2	3	4	5
1	(Israel) (Poland)	Shlomo Glickstein; Wojciech Fibak	6; 4	6; 2	6; 2
2	(Israel) (Poland)	Shahar Perkiss; Waldemar Rogowski	6; 1	6; 2	6; 2
3	(Israel) (Poland)	Shlomo Glickstein / Shahar Perkiss; Wojciech Fibak / Wojciech Kowalski	6; 3	6; 2	9; 7
4	(Israel) (Poland)	Amos Mansdorf; Waldemar Rogowski	7; 5	6; 2
5	(Israel) (Poland)	Shahar Perkiss; Wojciech Kowalski	6; 2	6; 1

==== Switzerland vs. Senegal ====
Switzerland
5
Tennisclub Disentis, Disentis, Switzerland
15–17 June 1984
Clay

Senegal
0

			1	2	3	4	5
1	(Switzerland) (Senegal)	Roland Stadler; Thierno Ly	6; 1	6; 3	6; 1
2	(Switzerland) (Senegal)	Jakob Hlasek; Yahiya Doumbia	6; 2	6; 1	4; 6	6; 2
3	(Switzerland) (Senegal)	Heinz Günthardt / Markus Günthardt; Yahiya Doumbia / Thierno Ly	6; 4	6; 1	6; 3
4	(Switzerland) (Senegal)	Jakob Hlasek; Thierno Ly	6; 4	6; 1	6; 1
5	(Switzerland) (Senegal)	Roland Stadler; Yahiya Doumbia	6; 2	6; 2	8; 6

=== Semifinals ===
==== Soviet Union vs. Austria ====
Soviet Union
3
Jūrmala, Soviet Union
13–15 July 1984
Clay

Austria
2

			1	2	3	4	5
1	(Soviet Union) (Austria)	Vadim Borisov; Peter Feigl	6; 0	7; 9	6; 1	1; 6	6; 8
2	(Soviet Union) (Austria)	Alexander Zverev; Bernhard Pils	6; 1	6; 3	6; 8	6; 8	3; 6
3	(Soviet Union) (Austria)	Vadim Borisov / Sergey Leonyuk; Alex Antonitsch / Peter Feigl	6; 4	6; 3	5; 7	6; 2
4	(Soviet Union) (Austria)	Alexander Zverev; Peter Feigl	4; 6	6; 3	3; 6	8; 6	6; 3
5	(Soviet Union) (Austria)	Vadim Borisov; Bernhard Pils	6; 4	6; 2	2; 6	6; 2

==== Israel vs. Switzerland ====
Israel
4
Canada Stadium, Ramat HaSharon, Israel
19–21 July 1984
Hard

Switzerland
1

			1	2	3	4	5
1	(Israel) (Switzerland)	Shlomo Glickstein; Heinz Günthardt	6; 3	7; 5	6; 3
2	(Israel) (Switzerland)	Shahar Perkiss; Jakob Hlasek	4; 6	2; 6	6; 3	6; 4	3; 6
3	(Israel) (Switzerland)	Shlomo Glickstein / Shahar Perkiss; Heinz Günthardt / Markus Günthardt	11; 9	6; 3	3; 6	6; 3
4	(Israel) (Switzerland)	Shlomo Glickstein; Jakob Hlasek	8; 6	14; 12	6; 2
5	(Israel) (Switzerland)	Shahar Perkiss; Heinz Günthardt	6; 4	6; 0

=== Final ===
==== Soviet Union vs. Israel ====
Soviet Union
3
Donetsk, Soviet Union
28–30 September 1984
Clay

Israel
2

			1	2	3	4	5
1	(Soviet Union) (Israel)	Andrei Chesnokov; Shahar Perkiss	7; 5	6; 3	7; 5
2	(Soviet Union) (Israel)	Alexander Zverev; Shlomo Glickstein	3; 6	6; 1	3; 6	7; 5	6; 8
3	(Soviet Union) (Israel)	Vadim Borisov / Sergey Leonyuk; Shlomo Glickstein / Shahar Perkiss	6; 2	11; 9	4; 6	4; 6	3; 6
4	(Soviet Union) (Israel)	Andrei Chesnokov; Shlomo Glickstein	6; 0	7; 9	1; 6	6; 2	6; 1
5	(Soviet Union) (Israel)	Alexander Zverev; Shahar Perkiss	2; 6	7; 5	10; 8	6; 4

== Zone B ==
=== Draw ===
First round 4–6 May
Hungary
bye
Cairo, Egypt (clay)
Egypt	5
Luxembourg	0
Bulgaria
bye
Istanbul, Turkey (clay)
Belgium	5
Turkey	0
Pamplona, Spain (indoor clay)
Spain	5
Algeria	0
bye
Netherlands
Casablanca, Morocco (clay)
Finland	5
Morocco	0
bye
Ireland

Quarterfinals; 15–17 June
Budapest, Hungary (clay)
Hungary	4
Egypt	1
Plovdiv, Bulgaria (clay)
Bulgaria	2
Belgium	3
Amsterdam, Netherlands (indoor carpet)
Spain	3
Netherlands	2
Helsinki, Finland (clay)
Finland	2
Ireland	3

Semifinals; 13–15 July
Brussels, Belgium (clay)
Hungary	3
Belgium	2
Vigo, Spain (clay)
Spain	4
Ireland	1

Final; 28–30 September
Budapest, Hungary (clay)
Hungary	1
Spain	4

=== First round ===
==== Egypt vs. Luxembourg ====
Egypt
5
Gezira Sporting Club, Cairo, Egypt
4–6 May 1984
Clay

Luxembourg
0

			1	2	3	4	5
1	(Egypt) (Luxembourg)	Tarek-Shawki El Sakka; Johny Goudenbour	6; 3	6; 4	3; 6	7; 5
2	(Egypt) (Luxembourg)	Ahmed El-Mehelmy; Stefan Kinsch	6; 2	6; 1	6; 3
3	(Egypt) (Luxembourg)	Ahmed El-Mehelmy / Tarek-Shawki El Sakka; Johny Goudenbour / Marc Klensch	6; 1	6; 1	6; 4
4	(Egypt) (Luxembourg)	Tarek-Shawki El Sakka; Stefan Kinsch	6; 1	6; 3
5	(Egypt) (Luxembourg)	Ahmed El-Mehelmy; Johny Goudenbour	7; 9	7; 5	11; 9

==== Turkey vs. Belgium ====
Turkey
0
T.E.D. Club, Istanbul, Turkey
4–6 May 1984
Clay

Belgium
5

			1	2	3	4	5
1	(Turkey) (Belgium)	Alaaddin Karagöz; Jan Vanlangendonck	1; 6	3; 6	3; 6
2	(Turkey) (Belgium)	Yavuz Erkangil; Bernard Boileau	4; 6	2; 6	2; 6
3	(Turkey) (Belgium)	Ramazan Oğuz Azkara / Yavuz Erkangil; Bernard Boileau / Alain Brichant	2; 6	0; 6	0; 6
4	(Turkey) (Belgium)	Yavuz Erkangil; Jan Vanlangendonck	3; 6	1; 6
5	(Turkey) (Belgium)	Yaman Esin; Bernard Boileau	3; 6	1; 6

==== Spain vs. Algeria ====
Spain
5
Club Tenis Pamplona, Pamplona, Spain
4–6 May 1984
Clay (indoors)

Algeria
0

			1	2	3	4	5
1	(Spain) (Algeria)	Emilio Sánchez; Kamel Harrad	6; 0	6; 0	6; 0
2	(Spain) (Algeria)	Juan Aguilera; Yassine Amier	6; 2	6; 1	6; 0
3	(Spain) (Algeria)	Juan Aguilera / Sergio Casal; Rabah Bouchabou / Abdel-Wahab Ghouli	6; 2	6; 1	6; 0
4	(Spain) (Algeria)	Emilio Sánchez; Yassine Amier	6; 1	6; 1
5	(Spain) (Algeria)	Juan Aguilera; Kamel Harrad	6; 0	6; 2

==== Morocco vs. Finland ====
Morocco
0
Al Amal Stadium, Casablanca, Morocco
4–6 May 1984
Clay

Finland
5

			1	2	3	4	5
1	(Morocco) (Finland)	Houcine Saber; Olli Rahnasto	5; 7	1; 6	5; 7
2	(Morocco) (Finland)	Arafat Chekrouni; Leo Palin	6; 3	3; 6	6; 3	0; 1		retired
3	(Morocco) (Finland)	Mohammed Dlimi / Houcine Saber; Leo Palin / Olli Rahnasto	4; 6	4; 6	7; 9
4	(Morocco) (Finland)	Mohammed Dlimi; Olli Rahnasto	0; 6	5; 7
5	(Morocco) (Finland)	Abdel Nadini; Kimmo Alkio	0; 6	1; 6

=== Quarterfinals ===
==== Hungary vs. Egypt ====
Hungary
4
Budapest, Hungary
15–17 June 1984
Clay

Egypt
1

			1	2	3	4	5
1	(Hungary) (Egypt)	Sándor Kiss; Tarek-Shawki El Sakka	2; 6	4; 6	5; 7
2	(Hungary) (Egypt)	Balázs Taróczy; Ahmed El-Mehelmy	6; 3	6; 2	6; 0
3	(Hungary) (Egypt)	Sándor Kiss / Balázs Taróczy; Ahmed El-Mehelmy / Tarek-Shawki El Sakka	7; 5	6; 1	6; 3
4	(Hungary) (Egypt)	Balázs Taróczy; Tarek-Shawki El Sakka	6; 0	6; 1	6; 2
5	(Hungary) (Egypt)	Sándor Kiss; Ahmed El-Mehelmy	7; 5	7; 5

==== Bulgaria vs. Belgium ====
Bulgaria
2
Tenis klub Lokomotiv, Plovdiv, Bulgaria
15–17 June 1984
Clay

Belgium
3

			1	2	3	4	5
1	(Bulgaria) (Belgium)	Julian Stamatov; Jan Vanlangendonck	8; 6	6; 2	7; 5
2	(Bulgaria) (Belgium)	Lyubomir Petrov; Bernard Boileau	2; 6	4; 6	2; 6
3	(Bulgaria) (Belgium)	Teodor Bachev / Krassimir Lazarov; Bernard Boileau / Alain Brichant	4; 6	4; 6	4; 6
4	(Bulgaria) (Belgium)	Lyubomir Petrov; Jan Vanlangendonck	6; 3	6; 4	4; 6	1; 6	3; 6
5	(Bulgaria) (Belgium)	Julian Stamatov; Bernard Boileau	6; 0	6; 0	6; 0

==== Netherlands vs. Spain ====
Netherlands
2
Amsterdam, Netherlands
15–17 June 1984
Carpet (indoors)

Spain
3

			1	2	3	4	5
1	(Netherlands) (Spain)	Michiel Schapers; Juan Aguilera	8; 6	8; 6	2; 6	2; 6	6; 3
2	(Netherlands) (Spain)	Huub van Boeckel; Sergio Casal	2; 6	2; 6	4; 6
3	(Netherlands) (Spain)	Huub van Boeckel / Michiel Schapers; Juan Aguilera / Sergio Casal	6; 2	6; 1	1; 6	4; 6	6; 3
4	(Netherlands) (Spain)	Michiel Schapers; Sergio Casal	4; 6	3; 6	0; 6
5	(Netherlands) (Spain)	Huub van Boeckel; Juan Aguilera	5; 7	4; 6	4; 6

==== Finland vs. Ireland ====
Finland
2
Helsinki, Finland
15–17 June 1984
Clay

Ireland
3

			1	2	3	4	5
1	(Finland) (Republic of Ireland)	Olli Rahnasto; Sean Sorensen	6; 3	6; 4	6; 4
2	(Finland) (Republic of Ireland)	Leo Palin; Matt Doyle	2; 6	5; 7	5; 7
3	(Finland) (Republic of Ireland)	Leo Palin / Olli Rahnasto; Matt Doyle / Sean Sorensen	4; 6	2; 6	1; 6
4	(Finland) (Republic of Ireland)	Leo Palin; Sean Sorensen	10; 8	7; 9	2; 6	4; 6
5	(Finland) (Republic of Ireland)	Olli Rahnasto; Matt Doyle	6; 1	6; 1

=== Semifinals ===
==== Belgium vs. Hungary ====
Belgium
2
Royal Primerose Tennis Club, Brussels, Belgium
13–15 July 1984
Clay

Hungary
3

			1	2	3	4	5
1	(Belgium) (Hungary)	Jan Vanlangendonck; Balázs Taróczy	7; 9	0; 6	4; 6
2	(Belgium) (Hungary)	Bernard Boileau; Sándor Kiss	6; 1	6; 2	7; 5
3	(Belgium) (Hungary)	Bernard Boileau / Alain Brichant; Sándor Kiss / Balázs Taróczy	8; 6	2; 6	10; 8	9; 11	1; 6
4	(Belgium) (Hungary)	Bernard Boileau; Balázs Taróczy	2; 6	4; 6	2; 6
5	(Belgium) (Hungary)	Jan Vanlangendonck; Sándor Kiss	6; 3	3; 6	7; 5

==== Spain vs. Ireland ====
Spain
4
Club de Campo, Vigo, Spain
13–15 July 1984
Clay

Ireland
1

			1	2	3	4	5
1	(Spain) (Republic of Ireland)	Juan Aguilera; Matt Doyle	6; 3	6; 4	6; 3
2	(Spain) (Republic of Ireland)	Emilio Sánchez; Sean Sorensen	6; 3	6; 0	6; 4
3	(Spain) (Republic of Ireland)	Sergio Casal / Emilio Sánchez; Matt Doyle / Sean Sorensen	6; 4	6; 0	6; 4
4	(Spain) (Republic of Ireland)	Juan Aguilera; Sean Sorensen	3; 6	1; 6
5	(Spain) (Republic of Ireland)	Emilio Sánchez; Michael Nugent	6; 0	6; 1

=== Final ===
==== Hungary vs. Spain ====
Hungary
1
Budapest, Hungary
28–30 September 1984
Clay

Spain
4

			1	2	3	4	5
1	(Hungary) (Spain)	Balázs Taróczy; Juan Aguilera	6; 2	3; 6	6; 3	10; 8
2	(Hungary) (Spain)	Sándor Kiss; Sergio Casal	3; 6	4; 6	2; 6
3	(Hungary) (Spain)	Sándor Kiss / Balázs Taróczy; Sergio Casal / Emilio Sánchez	9; 11	3; 6	4; 6
4	(Hungary) (Spain)	Balázs Taróczy; Sergio Casal	3; 6	7; 9	4; 6
5	(Hungary) (Spain)	Sándor Kiss; Juan Aguilera	8; 10	4; 6
