= 1986 Davis Cup Europe Zone =

International tennis competition

The Europe Zone was one of the three regional zones of the 1986 Davis Cup.

A new Africa Zone was contested for the first time, which served as a qualifying round for the Europe Zone. Teams from 9 African nations competed for 2 places in the Europe Zone main draws, joining an additional 24 teams. The winner of each sub-zone was then promoted to the following year's World Group.

France defeated Austria in the Zone A final, and Israel defeated Switzerland in the Zone B final, resulting in both France and Israel being promoted to the 1987 World Group.

== Participating nations ==
Africa Zone:

- Algeria
- Ivory Coast
- Kenya
- Libya
- Morocco
- Nigeria
- Senegal
- Tunisia
- Zimbabwe

Europe Zones:

- Austria
- Belgium
- Bulgaria
- Cyprus
- Denmark
- Egypt
- Finland
- Great Britain
- Greece
- Hungary
- Iran
- Ireland
- Israel
- Luxembourg
- Malta
- Monaco
- Netherlands
- Norway
- Poland
- Portugal
- Romania
- Saudi Arabia
- Switzerland
- Turkey

== Africa Zone ==
=== Draw ===
First round 17–19 January
Zimbabwe
bye
bye
Libya
Morocco
bye
bye
Kenya
Tunis, Tunisia (clay)
Nigeria	5
Tunisia	0
bye
Senegal
Ivory Coast
bye
bye
Algeria

Second Round; 7–9 March
Harare, Zimbabwe (hard)
Zimbabwe	5
Libya	0
Casablanca, Morocco (hard)
Morocco	3
Kenya	2
Dakar, Senegal (hard)
Nigeria	4
Senegal	1
Algiers, Algeria (clay)
Ivory Coast	0
Algeria	5

Third Round; 3–6 April
Harare, Zimbabwe (hard)
Zimbabwe	4
Morocco	1
Algiers, Algeria (clay)
Nigeria	3
Algeria	2

- Zimbabwe and Nigeria qualified to the Europe Zone main draws.

== Europe Zone A ==
=== Draw ===
First round 9–11 May; 23–25 May
France
bye
İzmir, Turkey (clay)
Luxembourg	2
Turkey	3
Cairo, Egypt (clay)
Egypt	5
Malta	0
Haskovo, Bulgaria (clay)
Bulgaria	5
Cyprus	0
Porto, Portugal (clay)
Zimbabwe	2
Portugal	3
bye
Austria
Warsaw, Poland (clay)
Finland	2
Poland	3
bye
Romania

Quarterfinals; 13–15 June
Istanbul, Turkey (clay)
France	5
Turkey	0
Haskovo, Bulgaria (clay)
Egypt	1
Bulgaria	4
Mayrhofen, Austria (clay)
Portugal	0
Austria	5
Warsaw, Poland (clay)
Poland	1
Romania	4

Semifinals; 18–20 July
Moliets-et-Maa, France (hard)
France	5
Bulgaria	0
Bad Kleinkirchheim, Austria (clay)
Austria	3
Romania	2

Final; 1–3 October
Montpellier, France (indoor carpet)
France	4
Austria	1

=== First round ===
==== Turkey vs. Luxembourg ====
Turkey
3
Culture Park, İzmir, Turkey
9–11 May 1986
Clay

Luxembourg
2

			1	2	3	4	5
1	(Turkey) (Luxembourg)	Alaaddin Karagöz; Johny Goudenbour	3; 6	2; 6	3; 6
2	(Turkey) (Luxembourg)	Necvet Demir; Serge Brueck	10; 8	6; 0	8; 6
3	(Turkey) (Luxembourg)	Necvet Demir / Alaaddin Karagöz; Serge Brueck / Johny Goudenbour	5; 7	6; 4	10; 8	6; 0
4	(Turkey) (Luxembourg)	Necvet Demir; Johny Goudenbour	9; 7	6; 3	4; 6	5; 7	4; 6
5	(Turkey) (Luxembourg)	Alaaddin Karagöz; Serge Brueck	7; 5	6; 2	6; 2

==== Egypt vs. Malta ====
Egypt
5
Gezira Sporting Club, Cairo, Egypt
9–11 May 1986
Clay

Malta
0

			1	2	3	4	5
1	(Egypt) (Malta)	Hisham Nasser; Steven Schranz	6; 3	6; 0	6; 0
2	(Egypt) (Malta)	Ahmed El-Mehelmy; Denis Galea	6; 0	6; 0	6; 1
3	(Egypt) (Malta)	Ahmed El-Mehelmy / Nael Zaki; Daryl Delicata / Steven Schranz	6; 4	6; 1	6; 3
4	(Egypt) (Malta)	Ahmed El-Mehelmy; Steven Schranz	6; 1	6; 3
5	(Egypt) (Malta)	Hisham Nasser; Denis Galea	6; 2	6; 2

==== Bulgaria vs. Cyprus ====
Bulgaria
5
Haskovo, Bulgaria
9–11 May 1986
Clay

Cyprus
0

			1	2	3	4	5
1	(Bulgaria) (Cyprus)	Krassimir Lazarov; Phivos Zachariades	6; 0	6; 1	6; 0
2	(Bulgaria) (Cyprus)	Julian Stamatov; Alkis Papamichael	6; 4	6; 0	4; 6	6; 4
3	(Bulgaria) (Cyprus)	Krassimir Lazarov / Marian Lazarov; Yiannos Hadjigeorgiou / Phivos Zachariades	6; 3	6; 0	6; 0
4	(Bulgaria) (Cyprus)	Milen Yanakiev; Yiannos Hadjigeorgiou	8; 6	6; 2
5	(Bulgaria) (Cyprus)	Krassimir Lazarov; Alkis Papamichael	6; 2	6; 4

==== Portugal vs. Zimbabwe ====
Portugal
3
Lawn Tennis Club da Foz, Porto, Portugal
9–11 May 1986
Clay

Zimbabwe
2

			1	2	3	4	5
1	(Portugal) (Zimbabwe)	João Cunha e Silva; Haroon Ismail	6; 2	6; 2	6; 1
2	(Portugal) (Zimbabwe)	Pedro Cordeiro; Philip Tuckniss	3; 6	6; 3	5; 7	4; 6
3	(Portugal) (Zimbabwe)	Pedro Cordeiro / João Cunha e Silva; Haroon Ismail / Orlando Lourenco	6; 1	6; 4	6; 1
4	(Portugal) (Zimbabwe)	João Cunha e Silva; Philip Tuckniss	6; 2	6; 2	4; 6	6; 8	4; 6
5	(Portugal) (Zimbabwe)	Pedro Cordeiro; Haroon Ismail	6; 3	6; 1	6; 2

==== Poland vs. Finland ====
Poland
3
Legia Warsaw, Warsaw, Poland
23–25 May 1986
Clay

Finland
2

			1	2	3	4	5
1	(Poland) (Finland)	Waldemar Rogowski; Olli Rahnasto	5; 7	6; 2	6; 2	4; 6	6; 8
2	(Poland) (Finland)	Lech Bieńkowski; Veli Paloheimo	6; 4	6; 4	6; 2
3	(Poland) (Finland)	Lech Bieńkowski / Wojciech Jamróz; Leo Palin / Olli Rahnasto	2; 6	6; 4	6; 4	6; 3
4	(Poland) (Finland)	Wojciech Jamróz; Olli Rahnasto	6; 3	4; 6	5; 7	2; 6
5	(Poland) (Finland)	Waldemar Rogowski; Leo Palin	6; 2	4; 6	6; 2	6; 1

=== Quarterfinals ===
==== Turkey vs. France ====
Turkey
0
T.E.C. Club, Istanbul, Turkey
13–15 June 1986
Clay

France
5

			1	2	3	4	5
1	(Turkey) (France)	Necvet Demir; Thierry Tulasne	2; 6	5; 7	2; 6
2	(Turkey) (France)	Alaaddin Karagöz; Thierry Pham	1; 6	3; 6	1; 6
3	(Turkey) (France)	Necvet Demir / Alaaddin Karagöz; Thierry Tulasne / Éric Winogradsky	2; 6	5; 7	2; 6
4	(Turkey) (France)	Atlihan Binoz; Jean-Philippe Fleurian	2; 6	2; 6
5	(Turkey) (France)	Necvet Demir; Thierry Pham	6; 3	2; 6	2; 6

==== Bulgaria vs. Egypt ====
Bulgaria
4
Tenis klub Haskovo, Haskovo, Bulgaria
13–15 June 1986
Clay

Egypt
1

			1	2	3	4	5
1	(Bulgaria) (Egypt)	Krassimir Lazarov; Ahmed El-Mehelmy	6; 4	6; 2	6; 2
2	(Bulgaria) (Egypt)	Julian Stamatov; Hisham Nasser	6; 2	6; 3	7; 5
3	(Bulgaria) (Egypt)	Krassimir Lazarov / Marian Lazarov; Ahmed El-Mehelmy / Nael Zaki	14; 12	3; 6	7; 5	6; 3
4	(Bulgaria) (Egypt)	Ruslan Rainov; Nael Zaki	1; 6	6; 4	7; 5
5	(Bulgaria) (Egypt)	Julian Stamatov; Ahmed El-Mehelmy	4; 6	2; 6

==== Austria vs. Portugal ====
Austria
5
Mayrhofen, Austria
13–15 June 1986
Clay

Portugal
0

			1	2	3	4	5
1	(Austria) (Portugal)	Horst Skoff; João Cunha e Silva	6; 4	6; 3	6; 2
2	(Austria) (Portugal)	Thomas Muster; Nuno Marques	6; 0	6; 1	6; 2
3	(Austria) (Portugal)	Alex Antonitsch / Thomas Muster; João Cunha e Silva / Nuno Marques	6; 3	3; 6	6; 3	6; 4
4	(Austria) (Portugal)	Horst Skoff; Nuno Marques	6; 2	6; 1
5	(Austria) (Portugal)	Thomas Muster; João Cunha e Silva	6; 2	6; 1

==== Poland vs. Romania ====
Poland
1
Legia Warsaw, Warsaw, Poland
13–15 June 1986
Clay

Romania
4

			1	2	3	4	5
1	(Poland) (Romania)	Waldemar Rogowski; Florin Segărceanu	5; 7	0; 6	4; 6
2	(Poland) (Romania)	Lech Bieńkowski; Andrei Dîrzu	6; 4	6; 1	7; 5
3	(Poland) (Romania)	Lech Bieńkowski / Wojciech Jamróz; Andrei Dîrzu / Florin Segărceanu	2; 6	3; 6	3; 6
4	(Poland) (Romania)	Waldemar Rogowski; Andrei Dîrzu	3; 6	2; 6	4; 6
5	(Poland) (Romania)	Lech Bieńkowski; Florin Segărceanu	3; 6	6; 1	3; 6

=== Semifinals ===
==== France vs. Bulgaria ====
France
5
Centre de Tennis de Moliets, Moliets-et-Maa, France
18–20 July 1986
Hard

Bulgaria
0

			1	2	3	4	5
1	(France) (Bulgaria)	Guy Forget; Julian Stamatov	6; 2	4; 6	6; 4	6; 4
2	(France) (Bulgaria)	Henri Leconte; Krassimir Lazarov	6; 1	6; 3	6; 3
3	(France) (Bulgaria)	Guy Forget / Henri Leconte; Krassimir Lazarov / Julian Stamatov	6; 2	6; 2	6; 4
4	(France) (Bulgaria)	Guy Forget; Krassimir Lazarov	7; 5	6; 4
5	(France) (Bulgaria)	Henri Leconte; Julian Stamatov	6; 3	6; 3

==== Austria vs. Romania ====
Austria
3
Tennisclub Bad Kleinkirchheim, Bad Kleinkirchheim, Austria
18–20 July 1986
Clay

Romania
2

			1	2	3	4	5
1	(Austria) (Romania)	Thomas Muster; Florin Segărceanu	6; 4	6; 4	5; 7	6; 4
2	(Austria) (Romania)	Horst Skoff; Andrei Dîrzu	6; 3	3; 6	6; 1	6; 4
3	(Austria) (Romania)	Alex Antonitsch / Thomas Muster; Andrei Dîrzu / Florin Segărceanu	4; 6	7; 9	3; 6
4	(Austria) (Romania)	Alex Antonitsch; Florin Segărceanu	6; 4	14; 16	8; 6	1; 6	5; 7
5	(Austria) (Romania)	Thomas Muster; Andrei Dîrzu	6; 2	6; 3	6; 2

=== Final ===
==== France vs. Austria ====
France
4
Palais des Sports, Montpellier, France
1–3 October 1986
Carpet (indoors)

Austria
1

			1	2	3	4	5
1	(France) (Austria)	Henri Leconte; Horst Skoff	6; 1	6; 2	6; 2
2	(France) (Austria)	Thierry Tulasne; Thomas Muster	4; 6	6; 3	3; 6	7; 5	6; 2
3	(France) (Austria)	Guy Forget / Henri Leconte; Alex Antonitsch / Thomas Muster	6; 4	6; 2	6; 2
4	(France) (Austria)	Henri Leconte; Thomas Muster	6; 3	6; 2
5	(France) (Austria)	Thierry Tulasne; Horst Skoff	6; 2	2; 6	3; 6

== Europe Zone B ==
=== Draw ===
First round 9–11 May
Monaco
bye
Iran
Hungary	w/o
Switzerland
bye
Filothei, Greece (clay)
Greece	5
Syria	0
Lagos, Nigeria (clay)
Nigeria	5
Norway	0
Saudi Arabia
Netherlands	w/o
Dublin, Ireland (indoor hard)
Belgium	4
Ireland	1
bye
Israel

Quarterfinals; 13–15 June
Monte Carlo, Monaco (clay)
Monaco	2
Hungary	3
Lucerne, Switzerland (clay)
Switzerland	5
Greece	0
Benin City, Nigeria (clay)
Nigeria	2
Netherlands	3
Ramat HaSharon, Israel (hard)
Belgium	0
Israel	5

Semifinals; 18–20 July
Budapest, Hungary (clay)
Hungary	2
Switzerland	3
Scheveningen, Netherlands (clay)
Netherlands	1
Israel	3

Final; 3–5 October
St. Gallen, Switzerland (indoor carpet)
Switzerland	1
Israel	4

=== First round ===
==== Greece vs. Syria ====
Greece
5
Filothei, Greece
9–11 May 1986
Clay

Syria
0

			1	2	3	4	5
1	(Greece) (Syria)	Fotis Vazeos; Dawood Dawoodian	6; 3	6; 1	6; 1
2	(Greece) (Syria)	George Kalovelonis; Shoukry Srourian	6; 2	6; 1	6; 0
3	(Greece) (Syria)	George Kalovelonis / Ioannis Rigas; Nasser Al Raai / Adnan-Mohammed Al Sadi	6; 2	6; 0	6; 2
4	(Greece) (Syria)	Ioannis Rigas; Dawood Dawoodian	6; 3	6; 1	6; 3
5	(Greece) (Syria)	Ioannis Kabakoglou; Shoukry Srourian	7; 5	6; 2	6; 2

==== Nigeria vs. Norway ====
Nigeria
5
Lagos, Nigeria
9–11 May 1986
Clay

Norway
0

			1	2	3	4	5
1	(Nigeria) (Norway)	Tony Mmoh; Tony Jønsson	6; 1	10; 8	6; 3
2	(Nigeria) (Norway)	Nduka Odizor; John Erik Rustad	6; 4	6; 2	6; 4
3	(Nigeria) (Norway)	Tony Mmoh / Nduka Odizor; Audun Jensen / John Erik Rustad	6; 2	6; 1	6; 2
4	(Nigeria) (Norway)	Nduka Odizor; Tony Jønsson	6; 3	6; 2
5	(Nigeria) (Norway)	Tony Mmoh; John Erik Rustad	6; 3	6; 3

==== Ireland vs. Belgium ====
Ireland
1
Fitzwilliam Lawn Tennis Club, Dublin, Ireland
9–11 May 1986
Hard (indoors)

Belgium
4

			1	2	3	4	5
1	(Republic of Ireland) (Belgium)	Matt Doyle; Jan Vanlangendonck	2; 6	3; 6	6; 1	7; 5	4; 6
2	(Republic of Ireland) (Belgium)	Sean Sorensen; Alain Brichant	9; 7	7; 9	5; 7	5; 7
3	(Republic of Ireland) (Belgium)	Matt Doyle / Sean Sorensen; Alain Brichant / Jan Vanlangendonck	2; 6	8; 10	7; 5	4; 6
4	(Republic of Ireland) (Belgium)	Sean Sorensen; Jan Vanlangendonck	2; 6	6; 4	3; 6
5	(Republic of Ireland) (Belgium)	Michael Nugent; Alain Brichant	8; 6	8; 10	6; 4

=== Quarterfinals ===
==== Monaco vs. Hungary ====
Monaco
2
Monte Carlo, Monaco
13–15 June 1986
Clay

Hungary
3

			1	2	3	4	5
1	(Monaco) (Hungary)	Bernard Balleret; Ferenc Csépai	7; 5	7; 5	4; 6	6; 1
2	(Monaco) (Hungary)	Gilles Ganancia; Balázs Taróczy	6; 8	1; 6	3; 6
3	(Monaco) (Hungary)	Bernard Balleret / Jacques Vinciléoni; Sándor Kiss / Balázs Taróczy	3; 6	3; 6	3; 6
4	(Monaco) (Hungary)	Bernard Balleret; Balázs Taróczy	4; 6	5; 7	5; 7
5	(Monaco) (Hungary)	Gilles Ganancia; Ferenc Csépai	6; 3	6; 4

==== Switzerland vs. Greece ====
Switzerland
5
Tennis Club Lido Lucerne, Lucerne, Switzerland
13–15 June 1986
Clay

Greece
0

			1	2	3	4	5
1	(Switzerland) (Greece)	Jakob Hlasek; Konstantinos Efraimoglou	6; 0	6; 3	6; 2
2	(Switzerland) (Greece)	Roland Stadler; George Kalovelonis	6; 1	7; 5	5; 7	6; 2
3	(Switzerland) (Greece)	Jakob Hlasek / Roland Stadler; Konstantinos Efraimoglou / George Kalovelonis	6; 1	7; 5	5; 7	6; 2
4	(Switzerland) (Greece)	Roland Stadler; Konstantinos Efraimoglou	6; 1	6; 3
5	(Switzerland) (Greece)	Jakob Hlasek; George Kalovelonis	6; 8	8; 6	6; 4

==== Nigeria vs. Netherlands ====
Nigeria
2
Benin City, Nigeria
13–15 June 1986
Clay

Netherlands
3

			1	2	3	4	5
1	(Nigeria) (Netherlands)	Tony Mmoh; Menno Oosting	7; 5	1; 6	1; 6	1; 6
2	(Nigeria) (Netherlands)	Sadiq Abdullahi; Tom Nijssen	1; 6	6; 4	6; 2	6; 3
3	(Nigeria) (Netherlands)	Sadiq Abdullahi / Tony Mmoh; Huub van Boeckel / Menno Oosting	6; 8	7; 9	6; 2	4; 6
4	(Nigeria) (Netherlands)	Sadiq Abdullahi; Menno Oosting	8; 10	3; 6	0; 6
5	(Nigeria) (Netherlands)	Tony Mmoh; Tom Nijssen	9; 7	6; 3

==== Israel vs. Belgium ====
Israel
5
Canada Stadium, Ramat HaSharon, Israel
13–15 June 1986
Hard

Belgium
0

			1	2	3	4	5
1	(Israel) (Belgium)	Shlomo Glickstein; Alain Brichant	6; 1	6; 1	6; 1
2	(Israel) (Belgium)	Amos Mansdorf; Jan Vanlangendonck	6; 0	6; 1	6; 4
3	(Israel) (Belgium)	Shlomo Glickstein / Amos Mansdorf; Alain Brichant / Jan Vanlangendonck	6; 2	13; 11	6; 3
4	(Israel) (Belgium)	Shlomo Glickstein; Jan Vanlangendonck	6; 3	7; 5
5	(Israel) (Belgium)	Gilad Bloom; Alain Brichant	6; 0	6; 2

=== Semifinals ===
==== Hungary vs. Switzerland ====
Hungary
2
Budapest, Hungary
18–20 July 1986
Clay

Switzerland
3

			1	2	3	4	5
1	(Hungary) (Switzerland)	Balázs Taróczy; Jakob Hlasek	7; 5	6; 3	6; 3
2	(Hungary) (Switzerland)	Ferenc Csépai; Roland Stadler	0; 6	0; 6	2; 6
3	(Hungary) (Switzerland)	Sándor Kiss / Balázs Taróczy; Heinz Günthardt / Jakob Hlasek	9; 11	7; 9	4; 6
4	(Hungary) (Switzerland)	Balázs Taróczy; Roland Stadler	4; 6	7; 5	6; 8	10; 8	6; 4
5	(Hungary) (Switzerland)	Ferenc Csépai; Jakob Hlasek	2; 6	4; 6	4; 6

==== Netherlands vs. Israel ====
Netherlands
1
Scheveningen, Netherlands
18–20 July 1986
Clay

Israel
3

			1	2	3	4	5
1	(Netherlands) (Israel)	Menno Oosting; Amos Mansdorf	6; 0	6; 4	6; 1
2	(Netherlands) (Israel)	Michiel Schapers; Shlomo Glickstein	5; 7	6; 2	9; 11	7; 9
3	(Netherlands) (Israel)	Huub van Boeckel / Menno Oosting; Shlomo Glickstein / Shahar Perkiss	6; 2	4; 6	8; 10	0; 6
4	(Netherlands) (Israel)	Menno Oosting; Shlomo Glickstein	3; 6	3; 6	3; 6
5	(Netherlands) (Israel)	Michiel Schapers; Amos Mansdorf	3; 6	2; 1				not completed

=== Final ===
==== Switzerland vs. Israel ====
Switzerland
1
St. Gallen, Switzerland
3–5 October 1986
Carpet (indoors)

Israel
4

			1	2	3	4	5
1	(Switzerland) (Israel)	Roland Stadler; Shlomo Glickstein	6; 4	8; 6	6; 8	1; 6	3; 4	retired
2	(Switzerland) (Israel)	Jakob Hlasek; Amos Mansdorf	2; 6	6; 1	3; 6	6; 3	10; 12
3	(Switzerland) (Israel)	Markus Günthardt / Jakob Hlasek; Shlomo Glickstein / Shahar Perkiss	6; 2	6; 4	6; 1
4	(Switzerland) (Israel)	Jakob Hlasek; Shlomo Glickstein	3; 6	6; 1	6; 8	12; 10	9; 11
5	(Switzerland) (Israel)	Markus Günthardt; Amos Mansdorf	5; 7	3; 6
