= 1996 Davis Cup Europe/Africa Zone Group II =

International tennis competition

The Europe/Africa Zone was one of the three zones of the regional Davis Cup competition in 1996.

In the Europe/Africa Zone there were three different tiers, called groups, in which teams competed against each other to advance to the upper tier. Winners in Group II advanced to the Europe/Africa Zone Group I. Teams who lost their respective ties competed in the relegation play-offs, with winning teams remaining in Group II, whereas teams who lost their play-offs were relegated to the Europe/Africa Zone Group III in 1997.

== Participating nations ==
- Algeria
- Belarus
- Egypt
- Ghana
- Great Britain
- Ivory Coast
- Latvia
- Luxembourg
- Macedonia
- Malta
- Nigeria
- Poland
- Portugal
- Slovenia
- Slovakia
- Yugoslavia

=== Draw ===
Relegation Play-offs
Novo Mesto, Slovenia (clay)
Slovenia	5
Malta	0
Skopje, Macedonia (clay)
Macedonia	2
Latvia	3
Nigeria	w/o
Luxembourg
Novi Sad, Yugoslavia (carpet)
Yugoslavia	5
Algeria	0

First Round
Newcastle upon Tyne, UK (ind. carpet)
Slovenia	1
Great Britain	4
Accra, Ghana (hard)
Ghana	5
Malta	0
Cairo, Egypt (clay)
Egypt	5
Macedonia	0
Jūrmala, Latvia (indoor hard)
Ivory Coast	3
Latvia	2
Warsaw, Poland (clay)
Poland	4
Nigeria	1
Esch-sur-Alzette, Lux. (indoor carpet)
Belarus	4
Luxembourg	1
Budva, Yugoslavia (clay)
Yugoslavia	1
Slovakia	4
Algiers, Algeria (clay)
Algeria	0
Portugal	5

Second Round
Accra, Ghana (hard)
Great Britain	5
Ghana	0
Cairo, Egypt (clay)
Egypt	3
Ivory Coast	2
Poznań, Poland (clay)
Poland	4
Belarus	1
Trnava, Slovakia (indoor carpet)
Slovakia	5
Portugal	0

Third Round
Wimbledon, United Kingdom (grass)
Great Britain	5
Egypt	0
Trnava, Slovakia (indoor carpet)
Poland	1
Slovakia	4

- Malta, Macedonia, Nigeria, and Algeria relegated to Group III in 1997.
- Great Britain and Slovakia promoted to Group I in 1997.

== First round ==
=== Great Britain vs. Slovenia ===
Great Britain
4
Castle Farm, Newcastle upon Tyne, United Kingdom
3–5 May 1996
Carpet (indoors)

Slovenia
1

			1	2	3	4	5
1	(United Kingdom) (Slovenia)	Greg Rusedski; Borut Urh	6; 1	6; 4	6^{0} 7^{7}	6; 3
2	(United Kingdom) (Slovenia)	Mark Petchey; Iztok Božič	4; 6	4; 6	6; 4	2; 6
3	(United Kingdom) (Slovenia)	Neil Broad / Greg Rusedski; Gregor Krušič / Borut Urh	7^{8} 6^{6}	6; 2	6; 3
4	(United Kingdom) (Slovenia)	Greg Rusedski; Iztok Božič	6; 1	6; 2	6; 2
5	(United Kingdom) (Slovenia)	Nick Gould; Borut Urh	6; 4	2; 6	6; 4

=== Ghana vs. Malta ===
Ghana
5
Accra Sports Stadium, Accra, Ghana
3–5 May 1996
Hard

Malta
0

			1	2	3	4	5
1	(Ghana) (Malta)	Franklyn Ofori; Daryl Delicata	6; 0	6; 4	7^{7} 6^{2}
2	(Ghana) (Malta)	Isaac Donkor; Mark Schembri	6; 4	6; 3	6^{5} 7^{7}	6; 1
3	(Ghana) (Malta)	Isaac Donkor / Franklyn Ofori; Daryl Delicata / Mark Schembri	6; 1	7^{7} 6^{5}	6; 5
4	(Ghana) (Malta)	Franklyn Ofori; Mark Schembri	6; 4	6; 4
5	(Ghana) (Malta)	Isaac Tetteh-Quaye; Daryl Delicata	6; 4	4; 6	7^{7} 6^{1}

=== Egypt vs. Macedonia ===
Egypt
5
Gezira Sporting Club, Cairo, Egypt
3–5 May 1996
Clay

Macedonia
0

			1	2	3	4	5
1	(Egypt) (North Macedonia)	Amr Ghoneim; Ognen Nikolovski	6; 0	6; 2	6; 3
2	(Egypt) (North Macedonia)	Tamer El-Sawy; Lazar Magdinčev	6; 2	6; 3	6; 0
3	(Egypt) (North Macedonia)	Tamer El-Sawy / Hisham Hemeda; Dragan Jovanovski / Ognen Nikolovski	6; 1	6; 4	6; 2
4	(Egypt) (North Macedonia)	Hisham Hemeda; Ognen Nikolovski	4; 6	6; 1	6; 0
5	(Egypt) (North Macedonia)	Amr Ghoneim; Lazar Magdinčev	6; 2	6; 1

=== Latvia vs. Ivory Coast ===
Latvia
2
National Tennis Centre Lielupe, Jūrmala, Latvia
3–5 May 1996
Hard (indoors)

Ivory Coast
3

			1	2	3	4	5
1	(Latvia) (Ivory Coast)	Armand Strombach; Claude N'Goran	3; 6	1; 6	3; 6
2	(Latvia) (Ivory Coast)	Ģirts Dzelde; Clément N'Goran	7; 5	6; 4	6; 1
3	(Latvia) (Ivory Coast)	Andris Fiļimonovs / Ģirts Dzelde; Claude N'Goran / Clément N'Goran	6^{5} 7^{7}	5; 7	3; 6
4	(Latvia) (Ivory Coast)	Ģirts Dzelde; Claude N'Goran	7^{7} 6^{1}	3; 6	1; 6	2; 6
5	(Latvia) (Ivory Coast)	Andris Fiļimonovs; Clément N'Goran	7^{7} 6^{1}	6; 3

=== Poland vs. Nigeria ===
Poland
4
KS Warszawianka, Warsaw, Poland
3–5 May 1996
Clay

Nigeria
1

			1	2	3	4	5
1	(Poland) (Nigeria)	Bartłomiej Dąbrowski; Ganiyu Adenekan	6; 1	6; 1	6; 3
2	(Poland) (Nigeria)	Adam Skrzypczak; Sule Ladipo	3; 6	4; 6	3; 6
3	(Poland) (Nigeria)	Michał Chmela / Bartłomiej Dąbrowski; Sule Ladipo / Godwin Omuta	6; 4	7^{7} 6^{1}	6; 2
4	(Poland) (Nigeria)	Bartłomiej Dąbrowski; Sule Ladipo	6; 1	2; 6	7^{7} 6^{5}	6; 1
5	(Poland) (Nigeria)	Adam Skrzypczak; Ganiyu Adenekan	6; 0	6; 4

=== Luxembourg vs. Belarus ===
Luxembourg
1
Centre National de Tennis, Esch-sur-Alzette, Luxembourg
3–5 May 1996
Carpet (indoors)

Belarus
4

			1	2	3	4	5
1	(Luxembourg) (Belarus)	Pascal Schaul; Alexander Shvets	2; 6	6^{1} 7^{7}	1; 6
2	(Luxembourg) (Belarus)	Sacha Thoma; Vladimir Voltchkov	1; 6	7; 5	7^{9} 6^{7}	7^{7} 6^{4}
3	(Luxembourg) (Belarus)	Johny Goudenbour / Alberto Paris; Max Mirnyi / Vladimir Voltchkov	6^{5} 7^{7}	2; 6	7^{7} 6^{1}	6^{2} 7^{7}
4	(Luxembourg) (Belarus)	Sacha Thoma; Alexander Shvets	5; 7	2; 6	6; 3	6; 2	3; 6
5	(Luxembourg) (Belarus)	Pascal Schaul; Vladimir Voltchkov	3; 6	2; 6

=== Yugoslavia vs. Slovakia ===
Yugoslavia
1
Centar Budvanska Rivijera, Budva, Yugoslavia
3–5 May 1996
Clay

Slovakia
4

			1	2	3	4	5
1	(Federal Republic of Yugoslavia) (Slovakia)	Nebojša Đorđević; Karol Kučera	1; 6	3; 6	5; 7
2	(Federal Republic of Yugoslavia) (Slovakia)	Bojan Vujić; Ján Krošlák	6; 4	0; 6	2; 6	3; 6
3	(Federal Republic of Yugoslavia) (Slovakia)	Dušan Vemić / Nenad Zimonjić; Ján Krošlák / Karol Kučera	7; 5	6; 4	2; 6	2; 6	6; 3
4	(Federal Republic of Yugoslavia) (Slovakia)	Bojan Vujić; Karol Kučera	5; 7	1; 6	4; 6
5	(Federal Republic of Yugoslavia) (Slovakia)	Nebojša Đorđević; Ján Krošlák	2; 6	6; 2	4; 6

=== Algeria vs. Portugal ===
Algeria
0
Olympic Complex, Algiers, Algeria
1–3 May 1996
Clay

Portugal
5

			1	2	3	4	5
1	(Algeria) (Portugal)	Ouassel Hared; Emanuel Couto	3; 6	0; 6	1; 6
2	(Algeria) (Portugal)	Abdelhak Hameurlaine; Bernardo Mota	2; 6	1; 6	1; 6
3	(Algeria) (Portugal)	Noujeim Hakimi / Abdelhak Hameurlaine; Emanuel Couto / Bernardo Mota	3; 6	1; 6	0; 6
4	(Algeria) (Portugal)	Mohammed Mahmoudi; Bruno Fragoso	4; 6	4; 6
5	(Algeria) (Portugal)	Ouassel Hared; Bernardo Mota	1; 6	0; 6

== Second round ==
=== Ghana vs. Great Britain ===
Ghana
0
Accra Sports Stadium, Accra, Ghana
12–14 July 1996
Hard

Great Britain
5

			1	2	3	4	5
1	(Ghana) (United Kingdom)	Isaac Donkor; Tim Henman	2; 6	0; 6	2; 6
2	(Ghana) (United Kingdom)	Franklyn Ofori; Luke Milligan	1; 6	6; 3	4; 6	2; 6
3	(Ghana) (United Kingdom)	Isaac Donkor / Franklyn Ofori; Neil Broad / Mark Petchey	1; 6	4; 6	1; 6
4	(Ghana) (United Kingdom)	Daniel Omaboe; Tim Henman	3; 6	6; 4	0; 6
5	(Ghana) (United Kingdom)	Isaac Donkor; Luke Milligan	4; 6	3; 6

=== Egypt vs. Ivory Coast ===
Egypt
3
Gezira Sporting Club, Cairo, Egypt
12–14 July 1996
Clay

Ivory Coast
2

			1	2	3	4	5
1	(Egypt) (Ivory Coast)	Tamer El-Sawy; Clément N'Goran	6; 2	7; 5	6; 2
2	(Egypt) (Ivory Coast)	Amr Ghoneim; Claude N'Goran	3; 6	6; 3	6; 1	4; 6	6; 3
3	(Egypt) (Ivory Coast)	Tamer El-Sawy / Hisham Hemeda; Claude N'Goran / Clément N'Goran	1; 6	1; 6	3; 6
4	(Egypt) (Ivory Coast)	Tamer El-Sawy; Claude N'Goran	6; 4	6; 2	6; 1
5	(Egypt) (Ivory Coast)	Amr Ghoneim; Clément N'Goran	3; 6	4; 6

=== Poland vs. Belarus ===
Poland
4
Olimpia Poznań, Poznań, Poland
12–14 July 1996
Clay

Belarus
1

			1	2	3	4	5
1	(Poland) (Belarus)	Bartłomiej Dąbrowski; Alexander Shvets	7; 5	6; 2	6; 4
2	(Poland) (Belarus)	Adam Skrzypczak; Max Mirnyi	6; 3	6; 2	6; 3
3	(Poland) (Belarus)	Michał Chmela / Bartłomiej Dąbrowski; Max Mirnyi / Vladimir Voltchkov	4; 6	6; 4	3; 6	2; 6
4	(Poland) (Belarus)	Bartłomiej Dąbrowski; Max Mirnyi	6; 4	7; 5	6; 1
5	(Poland) (Belarus)	Adam Skrzypczak; Vladimir Voltchkov	7^{7} 6^{1}	6; 3

=== Slovakia vs. Portugal ===
Slovakia
5
Městská hala, Trnava, Slovakia
12–14 July 1996
Carpet (indoors)

Portugal
0

			1	2	3	4	5
1	(Slovakia) (Portugal)	Ján Krošlák; Emanuel Couto	6; 0	6; 4	6; 1
2	(Slovakia) (Portugal)	Karol Kučera; Nuno Marques	7^{7} 6^{2}	2; 6	6; 4	6; 4
3	(Slovakia) (Portugal)	Ján Krošlák / Karol Kučera; Emanuel Couto / Bernardo Mota	6; 3	6; 2	6; 2
4	(Slovakia) (Portugal)	Ján Krošlák; Nuno Marques	6; 2	6; 3
5	(Slovakia) (Portugal)	Karol Kučera; Emanuel Couto	6; 4	6; 1

== Relegation play-offs ==
=== Slovenia vs. Malta ===
Slovenia
5
Teniški klub Krka, Novo Mesto, Slovenia
12–14 July 1996
Clay

Malta
0

			1	2	3	4	5
1	(Slovenia) (Malta)	Borut Urh; Mark Schembri	6; 0	6; 0	6; 1
2	(Slovenia) (Malta)	Iztok Božič; Maurizio Cappello	6; 0	6; 1	6; 1
3	(Slovenia) (Malta)	Andrej Kraševec / Gregor Krušič; Maurizio Cappello / Mark Schembri	6; 1	6; 3	6; 2
4	(Slovenia) (Malta)	Iztok Božič; Mark Schembri	6; 1	6; 1
5	(Slovenia) (Malta)	Borut Urh; Maurizio Cappello	6; 2	6; 1

=== Macedonia vs. Latvia ===
Macedonia
2
Tennis Club Jug, Skopje, Macedonia
12–14 July 1996
Clay

Latvia
3

			1	2	3	4	5
1	(North Macedonia) (Latvia)	Ognen Nikolovski; Andris Fiļimonovs	2; 6	3; 6	1; 6
2	(North Macedonia) (Latvia)	Zoran Ševčenko; Ģirts Dzelde	6; 3	6; 2	1; 6	6; 1
3	(North Macedonia) (Latvia)	Goran Popov / Zoran Ševčenko; Andris Fiļimonovs / Ģirts Dzelde	4; 6	4; 6	4; 6
4	(North Macedonia) (Latvia)	Goran Popov; Ģirts Dzelde	2; 6	3; 6	2; 6
5	(North Macedonia) (Latvia)	Zoran Ševčenko; Andris Fiļimonovs	7; 5	7; 5

=== Yugoslavia vs. Algeria ===
Yugoslavia
5
SD Vojvodina, Novi Sad, Yugoslavia
12–14 July 1996
Carpet

Algeria
0

			1	2	3	4	5
1	(Federal Republic of Yugoslavia) (Algeria)	Srđan Muškatirović; Abdelhak Hameurlaine	6; 1	6; 2	6; 1
2	(Federal Republic of Yugoslavia) (Algeria)	Nenad Zimonjić; Noujeim Hakimi	7^{7} 6^{5}	7^{7} 6^{5}	6; 2
3	(Federal Republic of Yugoslavia) (Algeria)	Dušan Vemić / Nenad Zimonjić; Noujeim Hakimi / Abdelhak Hameurlaine	7; 5	6; 4	7^{7} 6^{5}
4	(Federal Republic of Yugoslavia) (Algeria)	Nenad Zimonjić; Abdelhak Hameurlaine	3; 6	6; 3	6; 4
5	(Federal Republic of Yugoslavia) (Algeria)	Dušan Vemić; Sofiane Rais-Ali	6; 2	6; 1

== Third round ==
=== Great Britain vs. Egypt ===
Great Britain
5
All England Lawn Tennis and Croquet Club, Wimbledon, United Kingdom
20–22 September 1996
Grass

Egypt
0

			1	2	3	4	5
1	(United Kingdom) (Egypt)	Greg Rusedski; Tamer El-Sawy	6; 2	6; 4	7; 5
2	(United Kingdom) (Egypt)	Tim Henman; Amr Ghoneim	6; 0	6; 4	7; 5
3	(United Kingdom) (Egypt)	Neil Broad / Mark Petchey; Tamer El-Sawy / Amr Ghoneim	3; 6	6; 4	6; 3	6; 4
4	(United Kingdom) (Egypt)	Tim Henman; Tamer El-Sawy	6^{4} 7^{7}	6; 2	6; 2
5	(United Kingdom) (Egypt)	Greg Rusedski; Amr Ghoneim	6; 4	6; 2

=== Slovakia vs. Poland ===
Slovakia
4
Zimný štadión, Trnava, Slovakia
20–22 September 1996
Carpet (indoors)

Poland
1

			1	2	3	4	5
1	(Slovakia) (Poland)	Ján Krošlák; Bartłomiej Dąbrowski	7^{9} 6^{7}	6; 3	6; 3
2	(Slovakia) (Poland)	Karol Kučera; Adam Skrzypczak	6; 1	6; 1	6; 1
3	(Slovakia) (Poland)	Ján Krošlák / Karol Kučera; Michał Chmela / Michał Gawłowski	6; 1	6; 4	6^{5} 7^{7}	6; 0
4	(Slovakia) (Poland)	Karol Kučera; Bartłomiej Dąbrowski	6^{2} 7^{7}	6; 3	6; 4
5	(Slovakia) (Poland)	Dominik Hrbatý; Michał Gawłowski	7^{7} 6^{1}	3; 6	5; 7
