= 1987 Davis Cup =

1987 edition of the Davis Cup

Details
- Duration: 13 March – 20 December 1987
- Edition: 76th
- Teams: 69

Champion
- Winning nation: Sweden

The 1987 Davis Cup (also known as the 1987 Davis Cup by NEC for sponsorship purposes) was the 76th edition of the Davis Cup, the most important tournament between national teams in men's tennis. 72 teams would enter the competition, 16 in the World Group, 32 in the Europe Zone (including 11 in the Africa Zone), 13 in the Eastern Zone, and 11 in the Americas Zone.

Sweden defeated India in the final, held at the Scandinavium in Gothenburg, Sweden, on 18–20 December, to win their 4th Davis Cup title.

== World Group ==
Participating teams
| Argentina | Australia | Czechoslovakia | France |
| Great Britain | India | Israel | Italy |
| Mexico | Paraguay | South Korea | Spain |
| Sweden | United States | West Germany | Yugoslavia |

=== Draw ===
First round 13–15 March
Prato, Italy (clay)
Sweden | 3
Italy | 2
Marcq-en-Barœul, France (indoor carpet)
France | 5
South Korea | 0
Asunción, Paraguay (clay)
United States | 2
Paraguay | 3
Barcelona, Spain (clay)
West Germany | 2
Spain | 3
New Delhi, India (grass)
India | 3
Argentina | 2
Hradec Králové, Czechoslovakia (indoor carpet)
Israel | 3
Czechoslovakia | 2
Mexico City, Mexico (clay)
Great Britain | 0
Mexico | 5
Adelaide, Australia (grass)
Yugoslavia | 1
Australia | 4

Quarterfinals; 24–26 July
Fréjus, France (clay)
Sweden | 4
France | 1
Caracas, Venezuela (clay)
Paraguay | 2
Spain | 3
New Delhi, India (grass)
India | 4
Israel | 0
Brisbane, Australia (grass)
Mexico | 1
Australia | 4

Semifinals; 2–4 October
Barcelona, Spain (clay)
Sweden | 3
Spain | 2
Sydney, Australia (grass)
India | 3
Australia | 2

Final; 18–20 December
Gothenburg, Sweden (indoor clay)
Sweden | 5
India | 0

=== Final ===
Sweden vs. India

Sweden
5
Scandinavium, Gothenburg, Sweden
18–20 December 1987
Clay (indoors)

India
0

| | | | 1 | 2 | 3 | 4 | 5 |
|---|---|---|---|---|---|---|---|
| 1 | (Sweden) (India) | Mats Wilander; Ramesh Krishnan | 6; 4 | 6; 1 | 6; 3 |
| 2 | (Sweden) (India) | Anders Järryd; Vijay Amritraj | 6; 3 | 6; 3 | 6; 1 |
| 3 | (Sweden) (India) | Joakim Nyström / Mats Wilander; Anand Amritraj / Vijay Amritraj | 6; 2 | 3; 6 | 6; 1 | 6; 2 |
| 4 | (Sweden) (India) | Anders Järryd; Ramesh Krishnan | 6; 4 | 6; 3 |
| 5 | (Sweden) (India) | Mats Wilander; Vijay Amritraj | 6; 2 | 6; 0 |

=== Relegation play-offs ===
Date: 24–26 July

| Home team | Score | Visiting team | Location | Door | Surface |
|---|---|---|---|---|---|
| South Korea | 2–3 | Italy | Seoul | Outdoor | Hard |
| United States | 2–3 | West Germany | Hartford, CT | Indoor | Carpet |
| Czechoslovakia | 5–0 | Argentina | Prague | Outdoor | Clay |
| Yugoslavia | 3–2 | Great Britain | Zagreb | Outdoor | Clay |

- Czechoslovakia, Italy, West Germany and Yugoslavia remain in the World Group in 1988.
- Argentina, Great Britain, South Korea and United States are relegated to Zonal competition in 1988.

== Americas Zone ==
First round 30 January–1 February
Ecuador
bye
bye
Bolivia
Peru
bye
Caracas, Venezuela (hard)
Venezuela | 1
Canada | 4
Bogotá, Colombia (clay)
Uruguay | 5
Colombia | 0
bye
Brazil
Nassau, Bahamas (clay)
Caribbean/West Indies | 3
Cuba | 2
bye
Chile

Quarterfinals; 13–15 March
Guayaquil, Ecuador (clay)
Ecuador | 5
Bolivia | 0
Lima, Peru (clay)
Peru | 2
Canada | 3
Montevideo, Uruguay (indoor clay)
Uruguay | 2
Brazil | 3
Nassau, Bahamas (hard)
Caribbean/West Indies | 2
Chile | 3

Semifinals; 24–27 July
Edmonton, Canada (hard)
Ecuador | 3
Canada | 2
Santiago, Chile (clay)
Brazil | 3
Chile | 2

Final; 2–4 October
São Paulo, Brazil (clay)
Ecuador | 1
Brazil | 4

- Brazil are promoted to the World Group in 1988.

== Eastern Zone ==
First round 13–15 March
New Zealand
bye
Taipei, Taiwan (hard)
Singapore | 0
Chinese Taipei | 5
Thailand
bye
Dhaka, Bangladesh (hard)
Bangladesh | 0
Pakistan | 5
Colombo, Sri Lanka (clay)
Sri Lanka | 0
Philippines | 5
Kunming, China (indoor clay)
Indonesia | 1
China | 4
Causeway Bay, Hong Kong (hard)
Hong Kong | 5
Malaysia | 0
bye
Japan

Quarterfinals; 8–10 May
Taipei, Taiwan (hard)
New Zealand | 5
Chinese Taipei | 0
Bangkok, Thailand (hard)
Thailand | 3
Pakistan | 2
Wuhan, China (clay)
Philippines | 1
China | 4
Toyama, Japan (indoor carpet)
Hong Kong | 1
Japan | 4

Semifinals; 24–26 July
Bangkok, Thailand (hard)
New Zealand | 4
Thailand | 1
Tianjin, China (indoor carpet)
China | 3
Japan | 2

Final; 2–4 October
Shanghai, China (clay)
New Zealand | 4
China | 1

- New Zealand are promoted to the World Group in 1988.

== Europe Zone ==
=== Africa Zone ===
First round 30 January–1 February
Nigeria
bye
Abidjan, Ivory Coast (indoor carpet)
Tunisia | 0
Ivory Coast | 5
Zimbabwe
bye
Kenya | w/o
Djibouti
Dakar, Senegal (hard)
Morocco | 2
Senegal | 3
bye
Algeria
Libya
bye
bye
Egypt

Second Round; 13–22 March
Abidjan, Ivory Coast (indoor carpet)
Nigeria | 3
Ivory Coast | 2
Nairobi, Kenya (clay)
Zimbabwe | 5
Kenya | 0
Dakar, Senegal (hard)
Senegal | 4
Algeria | 1
Libya
Egypt | w/o

Third Round; 3–5 April
Harare, Zimbabwe (indoor hard)
Nigeria | 2
Zimbabwe | 3
Dakar, Senegal (hard)
Senegal | 3
Egypt | 2

- Zimbabwe and Senegal qualified to the Europe Zone main draws.

=== Europe Zone A ===
First round 6–10 May
Soviet Union
bye
Damascus, Syria (hard)
Syria | 0
Turkey | 5
Netherlands
bye
Marsa, Malta (hard)
Malta | 1
Ireland | 4
Bergen, Norway (indoor carpet)
Senegal | 3
Norway | 2
bye
Bulgaria
Belgium
bye
bye
Switzerland

Quarterfinals; 12–14 June
Istanbul, Turkey (clay)
Soviet Union | 4
Turkey | 1
Dublin, Ireland (indoor hard)
Netherlands | 4
Ireland | 1
Haskovo, Bulgaria (clay)
Senegal | 0
Bulgaria | 5
Lugano, Switzerland (clay)
Belgium | 0
Switzerland | 5

Semifinals; 24–26 July
Valkenswaard, Netherlands (indoor carpet)
Soviet Union | 4
Netherlands | 1
Haskovo, Bulgaria (clay)
Bulgaria | 0
Switzerland | 5

Final; 2–4 October
Donetsk, Soviet Union (clay)
Soviet Union | 2
Switzerland | 3

- Switzerland are promoted to the World Group in 1988.

=== Europe Zone B ===
First round 8–10 May
Austria
bye
Rhodes, Greece (clay)
Greece | 5
Luxembourg | 0
Hungary
bye
Monte Carlo, Monaco (clay)
Portugal | 3
Monaco | 2
Harare, Zimbabwe (indoor hard)
Zimbabwe | 2
Poland | 3
bye
Romania
Helsinki, Finland (indoor carpet)
Cyprus | 0
Finland | 5
bye
Denmark

Quarterfinals; 12–14 June
Bad Kleinkirchheim, Austria (clay)
Austria | 4
Greece | 1
Lisbon, Portugal (clay)
Hungary | 0
Portugal | 5
Brașov, Romania (clay)
Poland | 1
Romania | 4
Helsinki, Finland (indoor carpet)
Finland | 0
Denmark | 5

Semifinals; 24–26 July
Porto, Portugal (clay)
Austria | 4
Portugal | 1
Aarhus, Denmark (clay)
Romania | 2
Denmark | 3

Final; 2–4 October
Copenhagen, Denmark (indoor carpet)
Austria | 2
Denmark | 3

- Denmark are promoted to the World Group in 1988.
