= 1989 Davis Cup =

International men's tennis competition

Details
- Duration: 3 February – 17 December 1989
- Edition: 78th
- Teams: 79

Champion
- Winning nation: West Germany

The 1989 Davis Cup (also known as the 1989 Davis Cup by NEC for sponsorship purposes) was the 78th edition of the Davis Cup, the most important tournament between national teams in men's tennis. This year's tournament saw the expansion of the previous World Group Relegation Play-offs round into the World Group qualifying round; instead of advancing directly to the World Group, the Zonal Group I winners would now join the World Group first round losers for a chance to compete in the following year's World Group. This year also marked the introduction of the tiebreak, played at 6–6 in all sets except for the final set.

79 teams would enter the competition, 16 in the World Group, 14 in the Americas Zone, 19 in the Asia/Oceania Zone, and 30 in the Europe/Africa Zone. The Bahamas, Bahrain, the Dominican Republic, Kuwait and Jordan made their first appearances in the tournament.

West Germany defeated Sweden in the final, held at the Schleyer-Halle in Stuttgart, West Germany, on 15–17 December, to win their second consecutive Davis Cup title.

== World Group ==
Participating teams
| Australia | Austria | Czechoslovakia | Denmark |
| France | Indonesia | Israel | Italy |
| Mexico | Paraguay | Soviet Union | Spain |
| Sweden | United States | West Germany | Yugoslavia |

=== Draw ===
First round 3–5 February
Malmö, Sweden (indoor carpet)
Sweden | 4
Italy | 1
Vienna, Austria (indoor clay)
Australia | 0
Austria | 5
Belgrade, Yugoslavia (indoor clay)
Yugoslavia | 4
Denmark | 1
Marbella, Spain (clay)
Spain | 3
Mexico | 2
Fort Myers, Florida, United States (hard)
Paraguay | 0
United States | 5
Tel Aviv, Israel (indoor carpet)
Israel | 1
France | 4
Prague, Czechoslovakia (indoor carpet)
Soviet Union | 1
Czechoslovakia | 4
Karlsruhe, West Germany (indoor carpet)
Indonesia | 0
West Germany | 5

Quarterfinals; 7–9 April
Vienna, Austria (indoor clay)
Sweden | 3
Austria | 2
Split, Yugoslavia (indoor carpet)
Yugoslavia | 4
Spain | 1
San Diego, United States (indoor carpet)
United States | 5
France | 0
Prague, Czechoslovakia (indoor carpet)
Czechoslovakia | 2
West Germany | 3

Semifinals; 21–23 July
Båstad, Sweden (clay)
Sweden | 4
Yugoslavia | 1
Munich, West Germany (indoor carpet)
United States | 2
West Germany | 3

Final; 15–17 December
Stuttgart, West Germany (indoor carpet)
Sweden | 2
West Germany | 3

=== Final ===
West Germany vs. Sweden

West Germany
3
Schleyer-Halle, Stuttgart, West Germany
15–17 December 1989
Carpet (indoors)

Sweden
2

| | | | 1 | 2 | 3 | 4 | 5 |
|---|---|---|---|---|---|---|---|
| 1 | (West Germany) (Sweden) | Carl-Uwe Steeb; Mats Wilander | 7; 5 | 6; 7 | 7^{7} 6^{4} | 2; 6 | 3; 6 |
| 2 | (West Germany) (Sweden) | Boris Becker; Stefan Edberg | 6; 2 | 6; 2 | 6; 4 |
| 3 | (West Germany) (Sweden) | Boris Becker / Eric Jelen; Jan Gunnarsson / Anders Järryd | 7^{8} 6^{6} | 6; 4 | 3; 6 | 6^{4} 7^{7} | 6; 4 |
| 4 | (West Germany) (Sweden) | Boris Becker; Mats Wilander | 6; 2 | 6; 0 | 6; 2 |
| 5 | (West Germany) (Sweden) | Carl-Uwe Steeb; Stefan Edberg | 2; 6 | 4; 6 |

== World Group qualifying round ==
Date: 20–24 July

The eight losing teams in the World Group first round ties and eight winners of the Zonal Group I final round ties competed in the World Group qualifying round for spots in the 1990 World Group.

| Home team | Score | Visiting team | Location | Venue | Door | Surface |
|---|---|---|---|---|---|---|
| Great Britain | 2–3 | Argentina | Eastbourne | Devonshire Park Lawn Tennis Club | Outdoor | Grass |
| Peru | 2–3 | Australia | Lima | Jockey Club del Perú | Outdoor | Clay |
| Denmark | 1–4 | Italy | Aarhus | Aarhus Idrætspark | Indoor | Carpet |
| New Zealand | 4–1 | Hungary | Auckland | Chase Stadium | Indoor | Carpet |
| Netherlands | 5–0 | Indonesia | Best | Best Leisure Centre | Indoor | Carpet |
| South Korea | 1–4 | Israel | Seoul | Seoul Olympic Park Tennis Center | Outdoor | Hard |
| Mexico | 4–1 | Soviet Union | Mexico City | Club Alemán de México | Outdoor | Clay |
| Switzerland | 5–0 | Paraguay | Langenthal | Dreilinden Tenniscenter | Outdoor | Clay |

- Australia, Israel, Italy and Mexico remain in the World Group in 1990.
- Argentina, Netherlands, New Zealand and Switzerland are promoted to the World Group in 1990.
- Great Britain, Hungary, Peru and South Korea remain in Zonal Group I in 1990.
- Denmark, Indonesia, Paraguay and Soviet Union are relegated to Zonal Group I in 1990.

== Americas Zone ==
=== Group I ===
First round
Brazil
bye
Lima, Peru (clay)
Ecuador | 0
Peru | 5
Montreal, Canada (indoor carpet)
Canada | 4
Uruguay | 1
bye
Argentina

Second round
Lima, Peru (clay)
Brazil | 2
Peru | 3
Buenos Aires, Argentina (clay)
Canada | 0
Argentina | 3

- Peru and Argentina advance to World Group qualifying round.

Relegation Play-off
Montevideo, Uruguay (clay)
Ecuador | 0
Uruguay | 3

- Ecuador relegated to Group II in 1990.

=== Group II ===
First round
Kingston, Jamaica (hard)
Chile | 4
Jamaica | 1
Bogotá, Colombia (indoor clay)
Cuba | 4
Colombia | 1
Santo Domingo, Dominican Republic (clay)
Dominican Republic | 3
Bolivia | 2
Nassau, Bahamas (hard)
Bahamas | 5
Venezuela | 0

Second round
Havana, Cuba (hard)
Chile | 4
Cuba | 1
Nassau, Bahamas (hard)
Dominican Republic | 0
Bahamas | 5

Third round
Nassau, Bahamas (hard)
Chile | 4
Bahamas | 1

- Chile promoted to Group I in 1990.

== Asia/Oceania Zone ==
=== Group I ===
Preliminary round
Manila, Philippines (hard)
Philippines | 5
Hong Kong | 0

- Hong Kong relegated to Group II in 1990.

First round
New Zealand
bye
Manila, Philippines (hard)
Philippines | 4
China | 1
Hasaki, Japan (hard)
Japan | 2
South Korea | 3
bye
India

Second round
Manila, Philippines (indoor clay)
New Zealand | 4
Philippines | 1
Bharuch, India (grass)
South Korea | 4
India | 1

- New Zealand and South Korea advance to World Group qualifying round.

=== Group II ===
First round
Thailand
bye
Manama, Bahrain (hard)
Bahrain | 4
Syria | 1
Chinese Taipei
bye
Colombo, Sri Lanka (clay)
Sri Lanka | 3
Malaysia | 2
Baghdad, Iraq (hard)
Iraq | 2
Bangladesh | 3
bye
Singapore
Amman, Jordan (indoor hard)
Kuwait | 3
Jordan | 2
bye
Pakistan

Second round
Bangkok, Thailand (hard)
Thailand | 5
Bahrain | 0
Colombo, Sri Lanka (clay)
Chinese Taipei | 2
Sri Lanka | 3
Dhaka, Bangladesh (hard)
Bangladesh | 4
Singapore | 1
Kuwait City, Kuwait (hard)
Kuwait | 0
Pakistan | 5

Third round
Bangkok, Thailand (hard)
Thailand | 5
Sri Lanka | 0
Islamabad, Pakistan (clay)
Bangladesh | 0
Pakistan | 5

Fourth round
Rawalpindi, Pakistan (clay)
Thailand | 1
Pakistan | 3

- Pakistan promoted to Group I in 1990.

== Europe/Africa Zone ==
=== Group I ===
First round
Switzerland
bye
bye
Romania
Harare, Zimbabwe (indoor hard)
Zimbabwe | 1
Hungary | 4
bye
Nigeria
Great Britain
bye
Dublin, Ireland (indoor hard)
Ireland | 0
Finland | 5
Porto, Portugal (indoor clay)
Senegal | 0
Portugal | 5
bye
Netherlands

Second round
Liestal, Switzerland (clay)
Switzerland | 4
Romania | 1
Budapest, Hungary (clay)
Hungary | 4
Nigeria | 1
Helsinki, Finland (indoor carpet)
Great Britain | 4
Finland | 1
Best, Netherlands (indoor carpet)
Portugal | 1
Netherlands | 4

- Switzerland, Hungary, Great Britain and Netherlands advance to World Group qualifying round.

Relegation Play-off
Limerick, Ireland (carpet)
Ireland | 4
Senegal | 1

- Zimbabwe and Senegal relegated to Group II in 1990.

=== Group II Europe ===
First round 7–9 April
Luxembourg City, Luxembourg (indoor hard)
Luxembourg | 5
Malta | 0
Monte Carlo, Monaco (clay)
Cyprus | 0
Monaco | 5

Second round 5–14 May
Liège, Belgium (clay)
Belgium | 5
Turkey | 0
Luxembourg City, Luxembourg (indoor hard)
Norway | 2
Luxembourg | 3
Warsaw, Poland (clay)
Poland | 2
Greece | 3
Monte Carlo, Monaco (clay)
Monaco | 3
Bulgaria | 1

Third round 15–18 June
Luxembourg City, Luxembourg (indoor hard)
Belgium | 5
Luxembourg | 0
Athens, Greece (clay)
Greece | 3
Monaco | 2

Fourth round 21–23 July
Athens, Greece (clay)
Belgium | 5
Greece | 0

- Belgium promoted to Group I in 1990.

=== Group II Africa ===
First round 3–5 February
Tunis, Tunisia (hard)
Algeria | 5
Tunisia | 0

Second round 4–10 April
Accra, Ghana (hard)
Egypt | 1
Ghana | 4
Tripoli, Libya (hard)
Cameroon | 5
Libya | 0
Algiers, Algeria (clay)
Algeria | 1
Morocco | 3
Nairobi, Kenya (clay)
Kenya | 3
Ivory Coast | 2

Third round 16–18 June
Accra, Ghana (hard)
Ghana | 4
Cameroon | 1
Nairobi, Kenya (clay)
Morocco | 5
Kenya | 0

Fourth round 21–23 July
Accra, Ghana (hard)
Ghana | 4
Morocco | 1

- Ghana promoted to Group I in 1990.
