= 1988 Davis Cup =

1988 edition of the Davis Cup

Details
- Duration: 5 February – 18 December 1988
- Edition: 77th
- Teams: 74

Champion
- Winning nation: West Germany

The 1988 Davis Cup (also known as the 1988 Davis Cup by NEC for sponsorship purposes) was the 77th edition of the Davis Cup, the most important tournament between national teams in men's tennis. This year's tournament marked the introduction of subdivisions within each continental zone. Each zone would now feature two groups, with promotion and relegation between the two. This year also saw the Eastern Zone renamed as the Asia/Oceania Zone. 75 teams would enter the competition, 16 in the World Group, 13 in the Americas Zone, 16 in the Asia/Oceania Zone, and 30 in the Europe/Africa Zone. Cameroon, Ghana, Haiti, Iraq and Jamaica made their first appearances in the tournament.

West Germany defeated Sweden in the final, held at the Scandinavium in Gothenburg, Sweden, on 16–18 December, to win their first title and become the ninth nation to win the Davis Cup.

== World Group ==
Participating teams
Australia	Brazil	Czechoslovakia	Denmark
France	India	Israel	Italy
Mexico	New Zealand	Paraguay	Spain
Sweden	Switzerland	West Germany	Yugoslavia

=== Draw ===
First round 5–7 February
Gävle, Sweden (indoor carpet)
Sweden	5
New Zealand	0
Prague, Czechoslovakia (indoor carpet)
Czechoslovakia	5
Paraguay	0
Mexico City, Mexico (clay)
Australia	3
Mexico	2
Basel, Switzerland (indoor carpet)
France	4
Switzerland	1
Essen, West Germany (indoor carpet)
Brazil	0
West Germany	5
Aarhus, Denmark (indoor carpet)
Denmark	3
Spain	2
Palermo, Italy (clay)
Italy	4
Israel	1
New Delhi, India (grass)
Yugoslavia	3
India	2

Quarterfinals; 8–10 April
Norrköping, Sweden (indoor carpet)
Sweden	3
Czechoslovakia	2
Clermont-Ferrand, France (indoor clay)
Australia	0
France	5
Frankfurt, West Germany (indoor carpet)
West Germany	5
Denmark	0
Belgrade, Yugoslavia (indoor carpet)
Italy	1
Yugoslavia	4

Semifinals; 22–24 July
Båstad, Sweden (clay)
Sweden	4
France	1
Dortmund, West Germany (indoor carpet)
West Germany	5
Yugoslavia	0

Final; 16–18 December
Gothenburg, Sweden (indoor clay)
Sweden	1
West Germany	4

=== Final ===
Sweden vs. West Germany

Sweden
1
Scandinavium, Gothenburg, Sweden
16–18 December 1988
Clay (indoors)

West Germany
4

			1	2	3	4	5
1	(Sweden) (West Germany)	Mats Wilander; Carl-Uwe Steeb	10; 8	6; 1	2; 6	4; 6	6; 8
2	(Sweden) (West Germany)	Stefan Edberg; Boris Becker	3; 6	1; 6	4; 6
3	(Sweden) (West Germany)	Stefan Edberg / Anders Järryd; Boris Becker / Eric Jelen	6; 3	6; 2	5; 7	3; 6	2; 6
4	(Sweden) (West Germany)	Stefan Edberg; Carl-Uwe Steeb	6; 4	8; 6
5	(Sweden) (West Germany)	Kent Carlsson; Patrik Kühnen						w/o

=== Relegation play-offs ===
Date: 8–10 April

Home team	Score	Visiting team	Location	Door	Surface
Paraguay	4–1	New Zealand	Asunción	Outdoor	Hard
Switzerland	2–3	Mexico	St. Gallen	Indoor	Carpet
Spain	5–0	Brazil	Murcia	Outdoor	Clay
Israel	w/o	India	—	—	—

- Israel, Mexico, Paraguay and Spain remain in the World Group in 1989.
- Brazil, India, New Zealand and Switzerland are relegated to Zonal competition in 1989.

== Americas Zone ==
=== Group I ===
First Round; 4–7 February
Argentina
bye
Guayaquil, Ecuador (clay)
Ecuador	5
Canada	0
Viña del Mar, Chile (clay)
Peru	4
Chile	1
bye
United States

Second Round; 8–10 April
Guayaquil, Ecuador (clay)
Argentina	4
Ecuador	1
Lima, Peru (clay)
Peru	0
United States	3

Third Round; 22–24 July
Buenos Aires, Argentina (clay)
Argentina	1
United States	4

- United States are promoted to the World Group in 1989.

Relegation Play-off; 8–10 April
Vancouver, Canada (indoor carpet)
Canada	4
Chile	1

- Chile are relegated to Group II in 1989.

=== Group II ===
First Round; 5–7 February
Uruguay
bye
Havana, Cuba (hard)
Cuba	4
Bolivia	1
Caracas, Venezuela (hard)
Venezuela	4
Colombia	1
Kingston, Jamaica (hard)
Jamaica	5
Haiti	0

Second Round; 8–11 April
Havana, Cuba (hard)
Uruguay	5
Cuba	0
Kingston, Jamaica (hard)
Venezuela	3
Jamaica	2

Third Round; 22–24 July
Montevideo, Uruguay (clay)
Uruguay	4
Venezuela	1

- Uruguay are promoted to Group I in 1989.

== Asia/Oceania Zone ==
=== Group I ===
First Round; 5–7 February
South Korea
bye
Manila, Philippines (indoor clay)
Japan	2
Philippines	3
Jakarta, Indonesia (clay)
Thailand	0
Indonesia	5
bye
China

Second Round; 8–10 April
Seoul, South Korea (clay)
South Korea	5
Philippines	0
Jakarta, Indonesia (clay)
Indonesia	4
China	1

Third Round; 22–24 July
Jakarta, Indonesia (clay)
South Korea	2
Indonesia	3

- Indonesia are promoted to the World Group in 1989.

Relegation Play-off; 8–10 April
Bangkok, Thailand (hard)
Japan	4
Thailand	1

- Thailand are relegated to Group II in 1989.

=== Group II ===
First Round; 5–7 February
Hong Kong
bye
bye
Iraq
Singapore
bye
Saudi Arabia
Syria	w/o
Bangladesh
bye
bye
Chinese Taipei
Kuala Lumpur, Malaysia (indoor hard)
Sri Lanka	4
Malaysia	1
bye
Pakistan

Second Round; 8–11 April
Causeway Bay, Hong Kong (hard)
Hong Kong	5
Iraq	0
Damascus, Syria (indoor hard)
Singapore	4
Syria	1
Taipei, Taiwan (indoor hard)
Bangladesh	1
Chinese Taipei	4
Colombo, Sri Lanka (clay)
Sri Lanka	2
Pakistan	3

Third Round; 6–8 May
Hong Kong (indoor carpet)
Hong Kong	5
Singapore	0
Taipei, Taiwan (indoor carpet)
Chinese Taipei	1
Pakistan	4

Third Round; 22–24 July
Causeway Bay, Hong Kong (hard)
Hong Kong	5
Pakistan	0

- Hong Kong are promoted to Group I in 1989.

== Europe/Africa Zone ==
=== Group I ===
First Round; 6–8 May
Great Britain
bye
Brussels, Belgium (clay)
Finland	4
Belgium	1
Lagos, Nigeria (hard)
Hungary	0
Nigeria	5
bye
Austria
Netherlands
bye
Dakar, Senegal (hard)
Senegal	4
Bulgaria	1
Timișoara, Romania (clay)
Romania	2
Portugal	3
bye
Soviet Union

Second Round; 9–12 June
Bristol, United Kingdom (grass)
Great Britain	3
Finland	1
Villach, Austria (clay)
Nigeria	0
Austria	5
Warmond, Netherlands (clay)
Netherlands	3
Senegal	2
Lisbon, Portugal (clay)
Portugal	0
Soviet Union	5

Third Round; 22–24 July
Zell am See, Austria (clay)
Great Britain	0
Austria	5
Jūrmala, Soviet Union (clay)
Netherlands	0
Soviet Union	5

- Austria and Soviet Union are promoted to the World Group in 1989.

Relegation Play-offs; 10–13 June
Budapest, Hungary (clay)
Belgium	2
Hungary	3
Sofia, Bulgaria (clay)
Bulgaria	0
Romania	5

- Belgium and Bulgaria are relegated to Group II in 1989.

=== Group II Europe ===
First round 8–10 April
Poland
bye
bye
Luxembourg
Greece
bye
bye
Turkey
Stavanger, Norway (indoor hard)
Malta	0
Norway	5
bye
Monaco
Cyprus
bye
bye
Ireland

Second Round; 6–8 May
Warsaw, Poland (clay)
Poland	5
Luxembourg	0
Athens, Greece (clay)
Greece	4
Turkey	1
Bergen, Norway (indoor carpet)
Norway	4
Monaco	1
Cork, Ireland (indoor carpet)
Cyprus	0
Ireland	5

Third Round; 10–12 June
Athens, Greece (clay)
Poland	1
Greece	3
Belfast, Northern Ireland (grass)
Norway	2
Ireland	3

Third Round; 22–24 July
Dublin, Ireland (grass)
Greece	0
Ireland	5

- Ireland are promoted to Group I in 1989.

=== Group II Africa ===
First round 5–7 February
Zimbabwe
bye
bye
Cameroon
Algeria
bye
bye
Ivory Coast
Tunisia
bye
bye
Morocco
Accra, Ghana (indoor carpet)
Ghana	1
Kenya	4
bye
Egypt

Second Round; 8–10 April
Harare, Zimbabwe (indoor hard)
Zimbabwe	5
Cameroon	0
Abidjan, Ivory Coast (hard)
Algeria	2
Ivory Coast	3
Tunis, Tunisia (hard)
Tunisia	0
Morocco	5
Cairo, Egypt (clay)
Kenya	0
Egypt	5

Third Round; 6–8 May
Abidjan, Ivory Coast (hard)
Zimbabwe	3
Ivory Coast	2
Casablanca, Morocco (clay)
Morocco	2
Egypt	3

Third Round; 22–24 July
Harare, Zimbabwe (indoor hard)
Zimbabwe	5
Egypt	0

- Zimbabwe are promoted to Group I in 1989.
