= 1990 Davis Cup =

1990 edition of the Davis Cup

Details
- Duration: 2 February – 2 December 1990
- Edition: 79th
- Teams: 84

Champion
- Winning nation: United States

The 1990 Davis Cup (also known as the 1990 Davis Cup by NEC for sponsorship purposes) was the 79th edition of the Davis Cup, the most important tournament between national teams in men's tennis. 85 teams would enter the competition, 16 in the World Group, 19 in the Americas Zone, 19 in the Asia/Oceania Zone, and 31 in the Europe/Africa Zone. Barbados, Costa Rica, Guatemala, Togo, Trinidad and Tobago and Zambia made their first appearances in the tournament.

The United States defeated Australia in the final, held at the Florida Suncoast Dome in St. Petersburg, Florida, United States, on 30 November–2 December, to win their 29th title overall.

== World Group ==
Participating teams
Argentina	Australia	Austria	Czechoslovakia
France	Israel	Italy	Mexico
Netherlands	New Zealand	Spain	Sweden
Switzerland	United States	West Germany	Yugoslavia

=== Draw ===
First round 2–4 February
Bremen, West Germany (indoor carpet)
West Germany	3
Netherlands	2
Buenos Aires, Argentina (clay)
Argentina	3
Israel	0
Christchurch, New Zealand (grass)
Yugoslavia	2
New Zealand	3
Perth, Australia (grass)
France	2
Australia	3
Prague, Czechoslovakia (indoor carpet)
Switzerland	0
Czechoslovakia	5
Carlsbad, CA, United States (hard)
Mexico	0
United States	4
Barcelona, Spain (clay)
Spain	2
Austria	3
Cagliari, Italy (clay)
Italy	3
Sweden	2

Quarterfinals; 30 March–2 April
Buenos Aires, Argentina (clay)
West Germany	2
Argentina	3
Brisbane, Australia (grass)
New Zealand	2
Australia	3
Prague, Czechoslovakia (indoor carpet)
Czechoslovakia	1
United States	4
Vienna, Austria (indoor clay)
Austria	5
Italy	0

Semifinals; 21–23 September
Sydney, Australia (grass)
Argentina	0
Australia	5
Vienna, Austria (clay)
United States	3
Austria	2

Final; 30 November–2 December
St. Petersburg, FL, United States (indoor clay)
Australia	2
United States	3

=== Final ===
United States vs. Australia

United States
3
Florida Suncoast Dome, St. Petersburg, FL, United States
30 November–2 December 1990
Clay (indoors)

Australia
2

			1	2	3	4	5
1	(United States) (Australia)	Andre Agassi; Richard Fromberg	4; 6	6; 2	4; 6	6; 2	6; 4
2	(United States) (Australia)	Michael Chang; Darren Cahill	6; 2	7^{7} 6^{4}	6; 0
3	(United States) (Australia)	Rick Leach / Jim Pugh; Pat Cash / John Fitzgerald	6; 4	6; 2	3; 6	7^{7} 6^{2}
4	(United States) (Australia)	Andre Agassi; Darren Cahill	4; 6	6; 4				retired
5	(United States) (Australia)	Michael Chang; Richard Fromberg	5; 7	6; 2	3; 6

== World Group qualifying round ==
Date: 21–23 September

The eight losing teams in the World Group first round ties and eight winners of the Zonal Group I final round ties competed in the World Group qualifying round for spots in the 1991 World Group.

Home team	Score	Visiting team	Location	Venue	Door	Surface
Belgium	4–1	South Korea	Brussels	Royal Léopold Club	Outdoor	Clay
Israel	5–0	China	Ramat HaSharon	Canada Stadium	Outdoor	Hard
Canada	3–2	Netherlands	Toronto	National Tennis Centre	Outdoor	Hard
Soviet Union	1–4	Spain	Moscow	Lenin Central Stadium	Indoor	Carpet
Sweden	5–0	Finland	Västerås	Rocklundahallen	Indoor	Carpet
Great Britain	0–5	France	London	Queen's Club	Outdoor	Grass
Mexico	5–0	Uruguay	Mexico City	Club Alemán de México	Outdoor	Hard
Yugoslavia	3–2	Switzerland	Split	Športski centar Gripe	Indoor	Clay

- France, Israel, Mexico, Spain, Sweden and Yugoslavia remain in the World Group in 1991.
- Belgium and Canada are promoted to the World Group in 1991.
- China, Finland, Great Britain, South Korea, Soviet Union and Uruguay remain in Zonal Group I in 1991.
- Netherlands and Switzerland are relegated to Zonal Group I in 1991.

== Americas Zone ==
=== Group I ===
First Round
Paraguay
bye
Vancouver, Canada (indoor carpet)
Canada	4
Brazil	1
Montevideo, Uruguay (clay)
Uruguay	3
Chile	2
bye
Peru

Second Round
Asunción, Paraguay (clay)
Paraguay	0
Canada	5
Montevideo, Uruguay (clay)
Uruguay	4
Peru	1

- Canada and Uruguay advance to World Group qualifying round.

Relegation Play-off
Brasília, Brazil (indoor hard)
Brazil	4
Chile	1

- Chile relegated to Group II in 1991.

=== Group II ===
First Round
Ecuador
bye
Port of Spain, Trinidad and Tobago (hard)
Haiti	5
Trinidad and Tobago	0
Cuba
bye
Caracas, Venezuela (clay)
Jamaica	0
Venezuela	5
Cali, Colombia (clay)
Colombia	4
Guatemala	1
Santo Domingo, Dominican Republic (clay)
Costa Rica	2
Dominican Republic	3
Saint Michael, Barbados (clay)
Barbados	3
Bolivia	2
bye
Bahamas

Second Round
Port-au-Prince, Haiti (clay)
Ecuador	3
Haiti	2
Havana, Cuba (hard)
Cuba	4
Venezuela	1
Santo Domingo, Dominican Republic (clay)
Colombia	4
Dominican Republic	1
Saint Michael, Barbados (clay)
Barbados	4
Bahamas	1

Third Round
Havana, Cuba (hard)
Ecuador	1
Cuba	4
Saint Peter, Barbados (hard)
Colombia	4
Barbados	1

Fourth Round
Havana, Cuba (hard)
Cuba	3
Colombia	2

- Cuba promoted to Group I in 1991.

== Asia/Oceania Zone ==
=== Group I ===
Preliminary Round
Guangzhou, China (indoor hard)
China	5
Pakistan	0

- Pakistan relegated to Group II in 1991.

First Round
Indonesia
bye
Shanghai, China (clay)
China	5
Philippines	0
Chandigarh, India (grass)
Japan	1
India	4
bye
South Korea

Second Round
Beijing, China (hard)
Indonesia	1
China	4
Seoul, South Korea (clay)
India	0
South Korea	5

- China and South Korea advance to World Group qualifying round.

=== Group II ===
First Round
Hong Kong
bye
Amman, Jordan (indoor hard)
Jordan	0
Malaysia	5
Bangladesh
bye
Singapore (grass)
Singapore	0
Chinese Taipei	5
Manama, Bahrain (hard)
Iraq	2
Bahrain	3
bye
Sri Lanka
Kuwait City, Kuwait (hard)
Kuwait	4
Syria	1
bye
Thailand

Second Round
Kuala Lumpur, Malaysia (indoor hard)
Hong Kong	4
Malaysia	1
Dhaka, Bangladesh (hard)
Bangladesh	0
Chinese Taipei	5
Colombo, Sri Lanka (clay)
Bahrain	1
Sri Lanka	4
Kuwait City, Kuwait (hard)
Kuwait	0
Thailand	5

Third Round
Kowloon, Hong Kong (hard)
Hong Kong	4
Chinese Taipei	1
Colombo, Sri Lanka (clay)
Sri Lanka	1
Thailand	4

Fourth Round
Bangkok, Thailand (hard)
Hong Kong	2
Thailand	3

- Thailand promoted to Group I in 1991.

== Europe/Africa Zone ==
=== Group I ===
First Round
Soviet Union
bye
Accra, Ghana (hard)
Portugal	5
Ghana	0
Dublin, Ireland (indoor carpet)
Ireland	2
Romania	3
bye
Great Britain
Hungary
bye
bye
Belgium
Lagos, Nigeria (hard)
Finland	4
Nigeria	1
bye
Denmark

Second Round
Kyiv, Soviet Union (indoor clay)
Soviet Union	4
Portugal	1
Bucharest, Romania (clay)
Romania	2
Great Britain	3
Brussels, Belgium (clay)
Hungary	1
Belgium	4
Aarhus, Denmark (indoor carpet)
Finland	3
Denmark	2

- Soviet Union, Great Britain, Belgium and Finland advance to World Group qualifying round.

Relegation Play-off
Accra, Ghana (hard)
Ghana	2
Ireland	3

- Ghana and Nigeria relegated to Group II in 1991.

=== Group II Europe ===
First round 30 March–1 April
Greece
bye
Nicosia, Cyprus (clay)
Bulgaria	5
Cyprus	0
Luxembourg
bye
bye
Poland
Malta
bye
bye
Turkey
Norway
bye
bye
Monaco

Second Round; 4–6 May
Sofia, Bulgaria (clay)
Greece	0
Bulgaria	5
Luxembourg City, Luxembourg (indoor hard)
Luxembourg	1
Poland	4
İzmir, Turkey (clay)
Malta	2
Turkey	3
Monte Carlo, Monaco (clay)
Norway	4
Monaco	1

Third Round; 15–17 June
Warsaw, Poland (clay)
Bulgaria	1
Poland	4
İzmir, Turkey (clay)
Turkey	2
Norway	3

Third Round; 20–22 July
Warsaw, Poland (clay)
Poland	4
Norway	1

- Poland promoted to Group I in 1991.

=== Group II Africa ===
First round 1–4 February
Senegal
bye
Togo	w/o
Libya
Morocco
bye
Algiers, Algeria (clay)
Algeria	1
Egypt	4
Abidjan, Ivory Coast (hard)
Kenya	1
Ivory Coast	4
bye
Cameroon
Zambia
bye
bye
Zimbabwe

Second Round; 23 March–1 April
Lomé, Togo (hard)
Senegal	0
Togo	5
Cairo, Egypt (clay)
Morocco	5
Egypt	0
Abidjan, Ivory Coast (hard)
Ivory Coast	5
Cameroon	0
Lusaka, Zambia (hard)
Zambia	1
Zimbabwe	4

Third Round; 15–17 June
Casablanca, Morocco (clay)
Togo	0
Morocco	5
Harare, Zimbabwe (indoor hard)
Ivory Coast	0
Zimbabwe	5

Third Round; 20–22 July
Casablanca, Morocco (clay)
Morocco	4
Zimbabwe	1

- Morocco promoted to Group I in 1991.
