= Mmoh =

Mmoh (/moʊ/ MOH) is a surname. Notable people with the surname include:

- Michael Mmoh (born 1998), American tennis player, son of Tony
- Tony Mmoh (born 1958), Nigerian tennis player
