= Abdel Nadini =

Moroccan tennis player

- Country (sports): MAR Morocco
- Born: 14 September 1961 (age 65)
- Plays: Right-handed
- Prize money: $4,836

Singles
- Career record: 0–0
- Highest ranking: No. 558 (16 Jun 1986)

Doubles
- Career record: 0–0
- Highest ranking: No. 633 (2 Nov 1987)

Team competitions
- Davis Cup: 1–6
Medal record
Mediterranean Games
Silver medal – second place	1987 Latakia	Doubles

Abdel Nadini (born 14 September 1961) is a Moroccan former tennis player.

He has lived in Royan, France, since 1986.

== Career ==
Nadini was once, in the eighties, the second-highest-ranked tennis player from Morocco. He competed at the 1987 Mediterranean Games in Latakia, where he won a doubles silver medals partnering with Arafat Chekrouni.

He played in four Davis Cup ties for Morocco from 1984 to 1989 and won one of his seven rubbers.
