= Frank Ofori =

Ghanaian tennis player

- Full name: Franklyn Ofori
- Country (sports): Ghana
- Born: 23 February 1971 (age 54) Accra, Ghana

Singles
- Career record: 29–16 (Davis Cup)
- Highest ranking: No. 277 (24 Oct 1994)

Grand Slam singles results
- Wimbledon: Q1 (1995, 1996)

Doubles
- Career record: 13–15 (Davis Cup)
- Highest ranking: No. 274 (22 Aug 1994)

Grand Slam doubles results
- Wimbledon: Q1 (1995, 1996)
Medal record
All-Africa Games
Silver medal – second place	1991 Cairo	Men's doubles

Franklyn Ofori (born 23 February 1971) is a Ghanaian former professional tennis player.

== Tennis career ==
Born in Accra, Ofori played collegiate tennis in the United States for California Baptist University, where he was twice named in the NAIA All-American first team. He was the 1992 winner of the NAIA's Ward-Ballinger Memorial Award.

During the 1990s, he competed on the professional tour, reaching a best singles world ranking of 277. He was a quarter-finalist at the 1995 Singapore Challenger and appeared in qualifying at the Wimbledon Championships.

Ofori was member of the Ghana Davis Cup team between 1988 and 2001, appearing in a record 37 ties. He also holds the team records for most singles wins and doubles wins.

The tennis centre court at the Accra Sports Stadium was named after Ofori.
