= Tamer El-Sawy =

Egyptian tennis player

Tamer El-Sawy تامر الصاوي
- Country (sports): Egypt
- Residence: Tampa, Florida, U.S.
- Born: 11 February 1972 (age 54) Cairo, Egypt
- Height: 1.89 m (6 ft 2 in)
- Turned pro: 1993
- Retired: 1998
- Plays: Right-handed (one-handed backhand)
- Prize money: $193,953

Singles
- Career record: 7–14
- Career titles: 2 Titles
- Highest ranking: No. 128 (10 February 1997)

Grand Slam singles results
- Australian Open: 1995,1996,1997,1998
- French Open: 1994,1995,1996,1997,1998
- Wimbledon: 1994
- US Open: 1994,1995,1996,1997

Doubles
- Career record: 6–11
- Career titles: 5 Titles
- Highest ranking: No. 125 (6 April 1998)

Grand Slam doubles results
- Australian Open: First round main draw 1998

Tamer El-Sawy Arabic: تامر الصاوي, born 11 February 1972) is a retired Egyptian tennis player.

El-Sawy represented his country in the Davis Cup as his premier tournament at the age of 16. His first first-place finish for a collegiate tournament was the LSU Fall Showcase in 1992.El-Sawy finished his NCAA career ranked #3 in the nation and made the semi finals of the NCAA championship in 1993 His later career, in just a few years, would leave him as the top-seeded player for the Milwaukee Tennis Classic. His highest ATP ranking was 128 (from 10 February 1997) .
