= Orlando Lourenco =

Zimbabwean tennis player (born 1964)

- Country (sports): Zimbabwe
- Born: September 15, 1964 (age 60); Gwelo, Southern Rhodesia

Singles
- Highest ranking: No. 853 (5 November 1990)

Doubles
- Highest ranking: No. 922 (5 November 1990)

Orlando Lourenco (born 15 September 1964 in Gwelo) is a former tennis player from Zimbabwe.

Lourenco represented his native country at the 1984 Summer Olympics in Los Angeles, where he was defeated in the first round by France's Guy Forget. Lourenco reached his highest singles ATP-ranking on 5 November 1990, when he became world No. 853.

Lourenco participated in eight Davis Cup ties for Zimbabwe from 1983 to 1990, posting a 9–4 record in singles and a 1–2 record in doubles.

He now teaches tennis at the Champions Club in Chattanooga, Tennessee.
