= Ahmed El-Mehelmy =

Egyptian tennis player

- Country (sports): Egypt
- Born: 25 January 1962 (age 63); Cairo, Egypt
- Height: 6 ft 0 in (183 cm)
- Turned pro: 1984
- Plays: Right-handed
- Prize money: $26,515

Singles
- Career record: 2-10
- Career titles: 0
- Highest ranking: No. 175 (24 Mar 1986)

Grand Slam singles results
- US Open: 1R (1985)

Doubles
- Career record: 1-4
- Career titles: 0
- Highest ranking: No. 377 (19 May 1986)

Ahmed El-Mehelmy (born 25 January 1962) is a former professional tennis player from Egypt.

== Career ==
El-Mehelmy, who played collegiate tennis at the University of South Alabama, qualified for the main draw at the 1985 US Open. He lost a four set first round match to Dan Cassidy.

The Egyptian competed in Davis Cup tennis for his country from 1978 to 1990. He finished with a 22/23 competition record.
