= Clément N'Goran =

Ivorian tennis player

- Born: August 7, 1969 (age 55); Côte d'Ivoire
- Relatives: Claude N'Goran (brother) Tennis career
- Country (sports): Côte d'Ivoire
- Plays: Right-handed

Singles
- Career record: 2–4
- Highest ranking: No. 252

Doubles
- Career record: 3–4
- Olympic Games: Out 2nd round (1996)

Clément N'Goran (born August 7, 1969) is a former tennis player from Côte d'Ivoire,

== Career ==
N'Goran represented his native country as a qualifier at the 1988 Summer Olympics in Seoul. There he was defeated in the first round by Great Britain's Andrew Castle, in five sets, after two sets up (7–6, 6–3, 2–6, 6–7, 5–7).

The right-hander reached his highest singles ATP-ranking on November 11, 1991, when he became World Number 252. N'Goran also played at the 1996 Summer Olympics in Atlanta, Georgia, in doubles with his brother Claude, and the pair reached the second round.

N'Goran played in only a handful of tour events - in singles main draws, one in 1989, six in 1991, three in 1993, and one in 1995. He competed in two Grand Prix tennis events (the equivalent of today's ATP World Tour tourneys, upsetting Kelly Evernden and then losing to Steve Bryan in three sets at the 1991 RCA Championships and losing in the first round to Richey Reneberg at the 1995 Grand Prix de Tennis de Toulouse. He also contested 9 Challenger tournaments, winning 8 matches while losing 9. Three times he reached a quarter-final.

In doubles, he competed in one Challenger in 1988, a Challenger and Grand Prix event in 1989, four Challengers in 1991, four Challengers in 1993, and the Grand Prix de Tennis de Toulouse in 1996 and 1997. He reached the final of the 1991 Lagos Open Challenger, partnering Spaniard Daniel Marco. In three Grand Prix events, N'Goran lost in the first round of the 1989 Livingston Open, the first round of 1996 in Toulouse and the second round in 1997 (partnering Lionel Barthez). His career-high double ranking was World No. 311.

In Davis Cup, N'Goran played 18 ties during a 12-year period (between 1986 and 1997). His rubber win-lose record stands at 23 and 8 in singles and 8 and 4 in doubles. During this time, and in its Davis Cup history, Côte d'Ivoire has not advanced past Africa or Euro/Africa Group II, two levels below the World Group.
