= Tony Mmoh =

Nigerian tennis player

- Country (sports): Nigeria
- Residence: Kingston, Jamaica
- Born: 14 June 1958 (age 67); Enugu, Colony of Nigeria
- Height: 1.78 m (5 ft 10 in)
- Plays: Right-handed
- Prize money: $112,557

Singles
- Career record: 10–28
- Career titles: 0
- Highest ranking: No. 105 (19 October 1987)

Grand Slam singles results
- Australian Open: 2R (1988)
- Wimbledon: 1R (1987)
- US Open: 2R (1985)

Other tournaments
- Olympic Games: 2R (1988)

Doubles
- Career record: 10–34
- Career titles: 0
- Highest ranking: No. 105 (9 March 1987)

Anthony Emmanuel O. Mmoh (/moʊ/ MOH; born 14 June 1958) is a former tennis player from Nigeria, who represented his native country at the 1988 Summer Olympics in Seoul, where he was defeated in the second round by the Netherlands' wild card entry Michiel Schapers. The right-hander reached his highest singles ATP-ranking on 19 October 1987, when he became the number 105 of the world. His son Michael Mmoh is also a tennis player.
