= Ghana Davis Cup team =

National sports team

The Ghana Davis Cup team represents Ghana in Davis Cup tennis competition and are governed by the Ghana Tennis Association. They have not competed since 2015.

They competed in Group I in 1990.

== History ==
Ghana competed in its first Davis Cup in 1988.

== Current team (2022) ==
- Isaac Nortey
- Samuel Agbesi Osei Antwi
- Johnson Acquah
- Reginald Nii Okai Ocantey
- Frederick Egyir (Captain-player)

== See also ==
- Davis Cup
- Ghana Billie Jean King Cup team
