= Haroon Ismail =

Zimbabwean tennis player (born 1955)

- Country (sports): Zimbabwe
- Born: February 27, 1955 (age 70); Salisbury (now Harare)
- Height: 5 ft 10 in (178 cm)
- Plays: Right-handed
- Prize money: $86,308

Singles
- Career record: 20–45
- Highest ranking: No. 87 (October 20, 1980)

Grand Slam singles results
- French Open: 3R (1981)
- Wimbledon: 1R (1979, 1981, 1982)
- US Open: 1R (1981, 1982)

Doubles
- Career record: 13–41
- Highest ranking: No. 175 (January 3, 1979)

Grand Slam doubles results
- French Open: 2R (1982)
- Wimbledon: 1R (1979, 1980, 1983)
- US Open: 2R (1980)

Haroon Ismail (born February 27, 1955) is a former tennis professional from Rhodesia and Zimbabwe.

Ismail reached his highest ATP singles ranking on February 22, 1982, when he became world Number 95. He became runner-up in the 1980 Dutch Open tennis tournament. In 1981, Ismail won two rounds at the French Open, beating Francisco Gonzalez and Eric Deblicker, before losing to 14th-seed Wojtek Fibak.

Ismail played college tennis at Southern Methodist University.
