= Soviet Union Davis Cup team =

Former national tennis team

Soviet Union
- Nations Ranking: N/A
- First year: 1962
- Years played: 27
- Ties played (W–L): 70 (44–26)
- Years in World Group: 5 (0–5)
- Davis Cup titles: 0
- Most total wins: Alex Metreveli (80–25)
- Most singles wins: Alex Metreveli (56–14)
- Most doubles wins: Sergei Likhachev (24–11); Alex Metreveli (24–11)
- Best doubles team: Alex Metreveli and Sergei Likhachev (18–7)
- Most ties played: Alex Metreveli (38)
- Most years played: Alex Metreveli (14)

The Soviet Union men's national tennis team competed in 1962–1991. The team competed with the name 'Commonwealth of Independent States' in 1992.

Following 1992, the nations competed as:

- Russia men's national tennis team (historical records assumed by Russia)
- Armenia men's national tennis team (began 1996)
- Azerbaijan men's national tennis team (began 1996)
- Belarus men's national tennis team (began 1994)
- Estonia men's national tennis team (played independently in 1934; resumed in 1993)
- Georgia men's national tennis team (began 1994)
- Kazakhstan men's national tennis team (began 1995)
- Kyrgyzstan men's national tennis team (began 2002)
- Latvia men's national tennis team (began 1993)
- Lithuania men's national tennis team (began 1994)
- Moldova men's national tennis team (began 1995)
- Tajikistan men's national tennis team (began 1997)
- Turkmenistan men's national tennis team (began 2004)
- Ukraine men's national tennis team (began 1993)
- Uzbekistan men's national tennis team (began 1994)

== See also ==
- Davis Cup
- Soviet Union at the Hopman Cup
