= Arafat Chekrouni =

Moroccan tennis player (born 1966)

- Country (sports): Morocco
- Born: 17 July 1985 (age 40)
- Prize money: $9,983

Singles
- Career record: 0–0
- Highest ranking: No. 369 (27 October 1986)

Grand Slam singles results
- French Open Junior: 2R (1984)

Other tournaments
- Olympic Games: 2R (1984, demonstration)

Doubles
- Career record: 0–0
- Highest ranking: No. 676 (28 January 1985)

Team competitions
- Davis Cup: 9–13
Medal record
Mediterranean Games
Silver medal – second place	1987 Latakia	Doubles

Arafat Chekrouni (born 7 October 1966) is a former tennis player from Morocco.

Chekrouni represented his native country at the 1984 Summer Olympics in Los Angeles, where he was defeated in the second round by Italy's Paolo Canè. The Moroccan reached his highest singles ATP-ranking on 27 October 1986, when he became World Number 369.

Chekrouni participated in eleven Davis Cup ties for Morocco from 1984–1992, posting a 7-8 record in singles and a 2-5 record in doubles.
