= Senegal Davis Cup team =

National tennis team

The Senegal men's national tennis team represents Senegal in Davis Cup tennis competition and are governed by the Fédération Senegalaise de Tennis. They have not competed since 2005.

They reached the Group I semifinals in 1988.

== History ==
Senegal competed in its first Davis Cup in 1984.

== Current team (2022) ==
- Seydina Andre
- Nicolas Jadoun
- Yannick Languina
- Hassimiyou Dieng

== See also ==
- Davis Cup
- Senegal Billie Jean King Cup team
