= Ivory Coast Davis Cup team =

National tennis team

The Ivory Coast Davis Cup team represents Ivory Coast in Davis Cup tennis competition and are governed by the Fédération Ivoirienne de Tennis. They have not competed since 2012.

Ivory Coast have reached the promotion round of Group II on four occasions, but have never played in Group I.

== History ==
Ivory Coast first appearance in the Davis Cup was in 1986 where they competed in the Africa Zone with qualification to the European Zone. They loss to Algeria 5–0 in the 1986 edition before recording their first win in the following year against Tunisia before losing to Nigeria 3–2 in the following round.

== Current team (2022) ==
- Eliakim Coulibaly
- Abdoul Aziz Bationo
- Gueninle Abdoul Karim Ouattara
- Frederic Coulibaly

== See also ==
- Davis Cup
