= Zimbabwe Davis Cup team =

Zimbabwean national tennis team

Zimbabwe
- Nations Ranking: 62 (20 September 2021)
- Colors: Yellow & Green
- First year: 1963
- Years played: 38
- Ties played (W–L): 95 (49–46)
- Years in World Group: 3 (1–3)
- Best finish: Quarterfinals (1998)
- Most total wins: Byron Black (56–28)
- Most singles wins: Byron Black (39–20)
- Most doubles wins: Wayne Black (19–9)
- Best doubles team: Byron Black / Wayne Black (10–5)
- Most ties played: Byron Black (31)
- Most years played: Byron Black (15)

The Zimbabwe men's national tennis team represents Zimbabwe in Davis Cup tennis competition and are governed by the Zimbabwe Tennis Association. Zimbabwe currently competes in the Europe/Africa Zone of Group II. They last competed in the World Group in 2000.

== History ==
=== Beginnings ===
Zimbabwe competed in its first Davis Cup in 1963, as Rhodesia in the European Zone. They defeated the Netherlands before they lost to Sweden in the second round. In the next two years they got through to the second round of European qualifying. After skipping the 1966 and 1967 edition, they returned to the 1968 edition with protests in the original scheduled venue at Båstad as they had to move it to a neutral location in Southern France. Despite this, did not go on to win a match in two years before taking a break, which would be until 1976 where they were supposed to take on Ireland but after withdrawing from that edition, they lost to Switzerland 3-2.

=== World Group appearance ===
In the 1983 edition, they took on Turkey in the opening round of Zone B in the European Draw. After knocking over Turkey, they would lose to the Hungarians at home in the second round of the zone. In 1988, the team moved to Group II where at home they would take out the Group II division as they defeated Egypt to qualify to the top group in Europe. After staying in the Europe division for six years, they had the opportunity to go into the World Group for the first time against the Czech Republic. They would lose to the Czech Republic, before getting into the playoff again in 1997, this time they would win over Austria to qualify through to the World Group for the first time.

Entering the 1998 edition, they were expected to lose to Australia at Mildura. Wayne Black and Byron Black would surprise the world as they won the reverse singles to take the tie 3-2 and causing the big upset of that round. The quarter finals though they would lose 5-0 to the Italian team to record the country best result in a Davis Cup.

== Current team (2022) ==
- Benjamin Lock
- Mehluli Don Ayanda Sibanda
- Courtney John Lock
- Benedict Badza (Junior player)

== See also ==
- Davis Cup
- Zimbabwe Billie Jean King Cup team
- Zimbabwe at the Hopman Cup
