= Morocco Davis Cup team =

National tennis team

Morocco
- Captain: Mehdi Tahiri
- Nations Ranking: 60 ▲1 (20 September 2021)
- First year: 1961
- Years played: 44
- Ties played (W–L): 90 (47–43)
- Years in World Group: 3 (0–3)
- Most total wins: Karim Alami (32–18)
- Most singles wins: Younes El Aynaoui (26–11)
- Most doubles wins: Karim Alami (12–9)
- Best doubles team: Karim Alami / Hicham Arazi (6–4)
- Most ties played: Younes El Aynaoui (22); Karim Alami (22)
- Most years played: Younes El Aynaoui (14)

The Morocco men's national tennis team represents Morocco in Davis Cup tennis competition and are governed by the Royal Moroccan Tennis Federation.

Morocco currently competes in the World Group II.

== History ==
Morocco competed in its first Davis Cup in 1961. The team reached the World Group stage three times in 2001, 2002 and 2004. However, they failed to progress beyond that stage on all three occasions.

Morocco competed in the Europe/Africa Zone Group II. They last competed in the World Group in 2004 where they lost 5-0 against Argentina.

After an absence of almost 20 years, Casablanca was set to host Morocco vs Colombia for the 2026 Davis Cup World Group I play-offs. On 18 February 2026, Morocco lost 3-1 to Colombia. On 20 September 2026, Morocco qualified to the World Group I Playoffs After Beating Nigeria 4-0 in the 2026 Davis Cup World Group II.

== Current team (2026) ==
- Karim Bennani
- Yassine Dlimi
- Walid Ahouda
- Younes Lalami
- Amine Jamji

== See also ==
- Davis Cup
- Morocco Billie Jean King Cup team
