= 1992 Davis Cup Europe/Africa Zone Group I =

Tennis event

The Europe/Africa Zone was one of the three zones of the regional Davis Cup competition in 1992.

In the Europe/Africa Zone there were three different tiers, called groups, in which teams competed against each other to advance to the upper tier. Winners in Group I advanced to the World Group qualifying round, along with losing teams from the World Group first round. Teams who lost in the first round competed in the relegation play-offs, with winning teams remaining in Group I, whereas teams who lost their play-offs were relegated to the Europe/Africa Zone Group II in 1993.

== Participating nations ==
- Austria
- CIS
- Denmark
- Finland
- Hungary
- Israel
- Kenya
- Norway
- Poland
- Portugal
- Romania

=== Draw ===
First Round
CIS
bye
bye
Portugal
Nairobi, Kenya (clay)
Kenya	3
Romania	2
bye
Denmark
Israel
bye
Budapest, Hungary (indoor carpet)
Poland	2
Hungary	3
Oslo, Norway (indoor carpet)
Finland	3
Norway	2
bye
Austria

Second Round
Porto, Portugal (clay)
CIS	3
Portugal	2
Holbæk, Denmark (clay)
Kenya	0
Denmark	5
Ramat HaSharon, Israel (hard)
Israel	5
Hungary	0
Helsinki, Finland (indoor carpet)
Finland	1
Austria	4

- CIS, Denmark, Israel and Austria advance to World Group qualifying round.

Relegation Play-off
Oslo, Norway (indoor carpet)
Poland	1
Norway	4

- Romania and Poland relegated to Group II in 1993.

== First round ==
=== Kenya vs. Romania ===
Kenya
3
Nairobi Club Ground, Nairobi, Kenya
31 January–2 February 1992
Clay

Romania
2

			1	2	3	4	5
1	(Kenya) (Romania)	Paul Wekesa; Adrian Marcu	6; 3	7^{7} 6^{4}	6; 3
2	(Kenya) (Romania)	Eno Polo; Dinu Pescariu	6; 4	6; 0	7; 5
3	(Kenya) (Romania)	Eno Polo / Paul Wekesa; George Cosac / Adrian Marcu	7^{8} 6^{6}	7^{7} 6^{5}	6; 3
4	(Kenya) (Romania)	Norbert Oduor; Dinu Pescariu	4; 6	3; 6
5	(Kenya) (Romania)	Eno Polo; Adrian Marcu	3; 6	6^{7} 7^{9}

=== Hungary vs. Poland ===
Hungary
3
Vasas Sport Clubja, Budapest, Hungary
31 January–2 February 1992
Carpet (indoors)

Poland
2

			1	2	3	4	5
1	(Hungary) (Poland)	László Markovits; Bartłomiej Dąbrowski	6^{2} 7^{7}	7^{9} 6^{7}	7^{7} 6^{4}	0; 6	12; 14
2	(Hungary) (Poland)	Sándor Noszály; Tomasz Lichoń	7; 5	6; 1	4; 6	6; 4
3	(Hungary) (Poland)	András Lányi / László Markovits; Wojciech Fibak / Tomasz Iwański	3; 6	7; 5	6; 2	6; 2
4	(Hungary) (Poland)	Sándor Noszály; Bartłomiej Dąbrowski	6^{6} 7^{8}	6; 4	6; 4	6; 4
5	(Hungary) (Poland)	András Lányi; Tomasz Iwański	7; 5	6^{4} 7^{7}	11; 13

=== Norway vs. Finland ===
Norway
2
National Tennis Centre, Oslo, Norway
31 January–2 February 1992
Carpet (indoors)

Finland
3

			1	2	3	4	5
1	(Norway) (Finland)	Christian Ruud; Aki Rahunen	6^{4} 7^{7}	6; 2	2; 6	3; 6
2	(Norway) (Finland)	Bent-Ove Pedersen; Veli Paloheimo	6; 4	4; 6	7^{7} 6^{4}	7; 5
3	(Norway) (Finland)	Bent-Ove Pedersen / Christian Ruud; Veli Paloheimo / Olli Rahnasto	6; 3	6; 4	6; 4
4	(Norway) (Finland)	Christian Ruud; Veli Paloheimo	6^{3} 7^{7}	6; 1	6; 3	6^{2} 7^{7}	1; 6
5	(Norway) (Finland)	Bent-Ove Pedersen; Aki Rahunen	2; 6	1; 6	1; 6

== Second round ==
=== Portugal vs. CIS ===
Portugal
2
Porto Tennis Club, Porto, Portugal
1–3 May 1992
Clay

CIS
3

			1	2	3	4	5
1	(Portugal) (Commonwealth of Independent States)	João Cunha e Silva; Andrei Chesnokov	6; 1	6; 4	6; 3
2	(Portugal) (Commonwealth of Independent States)	Bernardo Mota; Andrei Cherkasov	3; 6	4; 6	2; 6
3	(Portugal) (Commonwealth of Independent States)	João Cunha e Silva / Nuno Marques; Andrei Cherkasov / Vladimir Gabrichidze	4; 6	6; 2	6; 4	4; 6	7; 5
4	(Portugal) (Commonwealth of Independent States)	João Cunha e Silva; Andrei Cherkasov	4; 6	3; 6	7^{7} 6^{4}	3; 6
5	(Portugal) (Commonwealth of Independent States)	Bernardo Mota; Andrei Chesnokov	6^{4} 7^{7}	4; 6	1; 6

=== Denmark vs. Kenya ===
Denmark
5
Holbæk Tennisklub, Holbæk, Denmark
1–3 May 1992
Clay

Kenya
0

			1	2	3	4	5
1	(Denmark) (Kenya)	Christian Camradt; Paul Wekesa	7^{7} 6^{1}	6; 3	6; 3
2	(Denmark) (Kenya)	Kenneth Carlsen; Eno Polo	6; 1	6; 0	6; 1
3	(Denmark) (Kenya)	Kenneth Carlsen / Morten Christensen; Eno Polo / Paul Wekesa	6; 4	6; 4	6; 4
4	(Denmark) (Kenya)	Kenneth Carlsen; Paul Wekesa	6; 4	6; 4
5	(Denmark) (Kenya)	Christian Camradt; Eno Polo	6; 4	6; 4

=== Israel vs. Hungary ===
Israel
5
Canada Stadium, Ramat HaSharon, Israel
1–3 May 1992
Hard

Hungary
0

			1	2	3	4	5
1	(Israel) (Hungary)	Gilad Bloom; Viktor Nagy	7^{7} 6^{5}	6; 1	6; 2
2	(Israel) (Hungary)	Shahar Perkiss; Sándor Noszály	7^{7} 6^{3}	6; 2	7; 5
3	(Israel) (Hungary)	Gilad Bloom / Shahar Perkiss; László Markovits / Sándor Noszály	6; 4	6; 2	6; 2
4	(Israel) (Hungary)	Gilad Bloom; Sándor Noszály	6; 3	6; 4
5	(Israel) (Hungary)	Eyal Ran; Viktor Nagy	6; 4	6; 3

=== Finland vs. Austria ===
Finland
1
Talin Tenniskeskus, Helsinki, Finland
1–3 May 1992
Carpet (indoors)

Austria
4

			1	2	3	4	5
1	(Finland) (Austria)	Olli Rahnasto; Horst Skoff	4; 6	3; 6	2; 6
2	(Finland) (Austria)	Veli Paloheimo; Alex Antonitsch	6^{3} 7^{7}	4; 6	6; 2	6; 2	6; 1
3	(Finland) (Austria)	Veli Paloheimo / Olli Rahnasto; Alex Antonitsch / Horst Skoff	6^{5} 7^{7}	5; 7	3; 6
4	(Finland) (Austria)	Veli Paloheimo; Horst Skoff	6^{6} 7^{8}	7; 5	6; 2	3; 6	9; 11
5	(Finland) (Austria)	Pasi Virtanen; Thomas Prerovsky	1; 6	5; 7

== Relegation play-offs ==
=== Norway vs. Poland ===
Norway
4
National Tennis Centre, Oslo, Norway
1–3 May 1992
Carpet (indoors)

Poland
1

			1	2	3	4	5
1	(Norway) (Poland)	Anders Håseth; Darek Nowicki	5; 7	7^{7} 6^{1}	7^{7} 6^{4}	6; 3
2	(Norway) (Poland)	Bent-Ove Pedersen; Bartłomiej Dąbrowski	6; 2	7^{7} 6^{5}	2; 6	6; 2
3	(Norway) (Poland)	Bent-Ove Pedersen / Anders Rolfsen; Bartłomiej Dąbrowski / Darek Nowicki	5; 7	2; 6	4; 6
4	(Norway) (Poland)	Anders Håseth; Bartłomiej Dąbrowski	4; 6	6; 2	6; 2	6; 4
5	(Norway) (Poland)	Bent-Ove Pedersen; Robert Sliwinski	6; 2	6; 4
