= 1989 Davis Cup Europe/Africa Zone Group I =

International tennis competition

The Europe/Africa Zone was one of the three zones of the regional Davis Cup competition in 1989.

In the Europe/Africa Zone there were two different tiers, called groups, in which teams competed against each other to advance to the upper tier. Winners in Group I advanced to the World Group qualifying round, along with losing teams from the World Group first round. Teams who lost in the first round competed in the relegation play-offs, with winning teams remaining in Group I, whereas teams who lost their play-offs were relegated to the Europe/Africa Zone Group IIs in 1990.

== Participating nations ==
- Finland
- Great Britain
- Hungary
- Ireland
- Netherlands
- Nigeria
- Portugal
- Romania
- Senegal
- Switzerland
- Zimbabwe

=== Draw ===
First Round
Switzerland
bye
bye
Romania
Harare, Zimbabwe (indoor hard)
Zimbabwe	1
Hungary	4
bye
Nigeria
Great Britain
bye
Dublin, Ireland (indoor hard)
Ireland	0
Finland	5
Porto, Portugal (indoor clay)
Senegal	0
Portugal	5
bye
Netherlands

Second Round
Liestal, Switzerland (clay)
Switzerland	4
Romania	1
Budapest, Hungary (clay)
Hungary	4
Nigeria	1
Helsinki, Finland (indoor carpet)
Great Britain	4
Finland	1
Best, Netherlands (indoor carpet)
Portugal	1
Netherlands	4

- Switzerland, Hungary, Great Britain and Netherlands advance to World Group qualifying round.

Relegation Play-off
Limerick, Ireland (carpet)
Ireland	4
Senegal	1

- Zimbabwe and Senegal relegated to Group II in 1990.

== First round ==
=== Zimbabwe vs. Hungary ===
Zimbabwe
1
City Sports Centre, Harare, Zimbabwe
3–5 February 1989
Hard (indoors)

Hungary
4

			1	2	3	4	5
1	(Zimbabwe) (Hungary)	Greig Rodger; Sándor Noszály	6^{5} 7^{7}	2; 6	1; 6
2	(Zimbabwe) (Hungary)	Byron Black; András Lányi	3; 6	6; 2	6^{4} 7^{7}	6; 4	3; 6
3	(Zimbabwe) (Hungary)	Byron Black / Greig Rodger; András Lányi / László Markovits	2; 6	7; 5	6; 1	5; 7	8; 10
4	(Zimbabwe) (Hungary)	Greig Rodger; András Lányi	2; 6	2; 6
5	(Zimbabwe) (Hungary)	Byron Black; Sándor Noszály	6; 4	4; 6	8; 6

=== Ireland vs. Finland ===
Ireland
0
Fitzwilliam Lawn Tennis Club, Dublin, Ireland
3–5 February 1989
Hard (indoors)

Finland
5

			1	2	3	4	5
1	(Republic of Ireland) (Finland)	Eoin Collins; Veli Paloheimo	2; 6	4; 6	3; 6
2	(Republic of Ireland) (Finland)	Owen Casey; Olli Rahnasto	5; 7	1; 6	4; 6
3	(Republic of Ireland) (Finland)	Owen Casey / Eoin Collins; Veli Paloheimo / Olli Rahnasto	4; 6	7^{9} 6^{7}	1; 6	4; 6
4	(Republic of Ireland) (Finland)	Owen Casey; Kimmo Hurme	3; 6	6^{5} 7^{7}
5	(Republic of Ireland) (Finland)	Eoin Collins; Olli Rahnasto	7; 5	3; 6	2; 6

=== Portugal vs. Senegal ===
Portugal
5
Porto Tennis Club, Porto, Portugal
3–5 February 1989
Clay (indoors)

Senegal
0

			1	2	3	4	5
1	(Portugal) (Senegal)	Nuno Marques; Yahiya Doumbia	6; 4	6; 4	6; 4
2	(Portugal) (Senegal)	João Cunha e Silva; Thierno Ly	6; 0	6; 0	6; 3
3	(Portugal) (Senegal)	Nuno Marques / João Cunha e Silva; Abou Berthé / Yahiya Doumbia	6; 4	6; 4	6; 2
4	(Portugal) (Senegal)	João Cunha e Silva; Yahiya Doumbia	2; 6	6; 1	6; 2
5	(Portugal) (Senegal)	Nuno Marques; Thierno Ly	6; 0	6; 0

== Second round ==
=== Switzerland vs. Romania ===
Switzerland
4
Tennisclub Liestal, Liestal, Switzerland
5–7 May 1989
Clay

Romania
1

			1	2	3	4	5
1	(Switzerland) (Romania)	Claudio Mezzadri; Adrian Marcu	4; 6	6; 1	6; 4	6; 4
2	(Switzerland) (Romania)	Jakob Hlasek; George Cosac	6; 1	1; 6	7; 5	6; 3
3	(Switzerland) (Romania)	Heinz Günthardt / Jakob Hlasek; George Cosac / Florin Segărceanu	6; 4	4; 6	6^{4} 7^{7}	6; 3	9; 11
4	(Switzerland) (Romania)	Jakob Hlasek; Adrian Marcu	7^{7} 6^{4}	4; 6	6; 4	6; 4
5	(Switzerland) (Romania)	Claudio Mezzadri; George Cosac	7^{7} 6^{5}	6; 1

=== Hungary vs. Nigeria ===
Hungary
4
Dózsa Stadium, Budapest, Hungary
5–7 May 1989
Clay

Nigeria
1

			1	2	3	4	5
1	(Hungary) (Nigeria)	Sándor Noszály; Nduka Odizor	6; 1	2; 6	6^{7} 7^{9}	6; 2	6; 3
2	(Hungary) (Nigeria)	András Lányi; Sadiq Abdullahi	6; 3	6; 3	6; 4
3	(Hungary) (Nigeria)	Gábor Köves / László Markovits; Sadiq Abdullahi / Nduka Odizor	6; 1	4; 6	6; 3	6; 0
4	(Hungary) (Nigeria)	András Lányi; Nduka Odizor	4; 6	7^{7} 6^{5}	2; 6
5	(Hungary) (Nigeria)	Sándor Noszály; Sadiq Abdullahi	5; 2					retired

=== Finland vs. Great Britain ===
Finland
1
Tennispalatsi, Helsinki, Finland
5–7 May 1989
Carpet (indoors)

Great Britain
4

			1	2	3	4	5
1	(Finland) (United Kingdom)	Olli Rahnasto; Jeremy Bates	1; 6	2; 6	5; 7
2	(Finland) (United Kingdom)	Veli Paloheimo; Chris Bailey	6; 1	6; 2	4; 6	7^{7} 6^{3}
3	(Finland) (United Kingdom)	Veli Paloheimo / Olli Rahnasto; Jeremy Bates / Andrew Castle	4; 6	6^{4} 7^{7}	5; 7
4	(Finland) (United Kingdom)	Olli Rahnasto; Chris Bailey	4; 6	6^{10} 7^{12}	5; 7
5	(Finland) (United Kingdom)	Veli Paloheimo; Jeremy Bates	2; 6	5; 7

=== Netherlands vs. Portugal ===
Netherlands
4
Best Leisure Centre, Best, Netherlands
5–7 May 1989
Carpet (indoors)

Portugal
1

			1	2	3	4	5
1	(Netherlands) (Portugal)	Michiel Schapers; João Cunha e Silva	6; 1	6; 2	6; 2
2	(Netherlands) (Portugal)	Tom Nijssen; Pedro Cordeiro	4; 6	6; 2	6; 2	6; 2
3	(Netherlands) (Portugal)	Tom Nijssen / Michiel Schapers; Pedro Cordeiro / João Cunha e Silva	6; 1	7; 5	6; 0
4	(Netherlands) (Portugal)	Tom Nijssen; João Cunha e Silva	6; 3	4; 6	2; 6
5	(Netherlands) (Portugal)	Michiel Schapers; Pedro Cordeiro	6; 1	6; 2

== Relegation play-off ==
=== Ireland vs. Senegal ===
Ireland
4
Limerick Lawn Tennis Club, Limerick, Ireland
5–7 May 1989
Carpet

Senegal
1

			1	2	3	4	5
1	(Republic of Ireland) (Senegal)	Peter Wright; Abou Berthé	6; 1	6; 1	6; 1
2	(Republic of Ireland) (Senegal)	Robert Dolan; Yahiya Doumbia	1; 6	4; 6	0; 6
3	(Republic of Ireland) (Senegal)	Sean Molloy / Peter Wright; Abou Berthé / Yahiya Doumbia	6; 4	4; 6	5; 7	6; 3	11; 9
4	(Republic of Ireland) (Senegal)	Peter Wright; Yahiya Doumbia	6; 3	6; 4	6; 4
5	(Republic of Ireland) (Senegal)	Robert Dolan; Abou Berthé	6; 2	6; 3
