= 1988 Davis Cup Europe/Africa Zone Group I =

International tennis competition

The Europe/Africa Zone was one of the three zones of the regional Davis Cup competition in 1988.

In the Europe/Africa Zone there were two different tiers, called groups, in which teams competed against each other to advance to the upper tier. Winners in Group I were promoted to the following year's World Group. Teams who lost in the first round competed in the relegation play-offs, with winning teams remaining in Group I, whereas teams who lost their play-offs were relegated to the Europe/Africa Zone Group IIs in 1989.

== Participating nations ==
- Austria
- Belgium
- Bulgaria
- Finland
- Great Britain
- Hungary
- Netherlands
- Nigeria
- Portugal
- Romania
- Senegal
- Soviet Union

=== Draw ===
First Round; 6–8 May
Great Britain
bye
Brussels, Belgium (clay)
Finland	4
Belgium	1
Lagos, Nigeria (hard)
Hungary	0
Nigeria	5
bye
Austria
Netherlands
bye
Dakar, Senegal (hard)
Senegal	4
Bulgaria	1
Timișoara, Romania (clay)
Romania	2
Portugal	3
bye
Soviet Union

Second Round; 9–12 June
Bristol, United Kingdom (grass)
Great Britain	3
Finland	1
Villach, Austria (clay)
Nigeria	0
Austria	5
Warmond, Netherlands (clay)
Netherlands	3
Senegal	2
Lisbon, Portugal (clay)
Portugal	0
Soviet Union	5

Third Round; 22–24 July
Zell am See, Austria (clay)
Great Britain	0
Austria	5
Jūrmala, Soviet Union (clay)
Netherlands	0
Soviet Union	5

- Austria and Soviet Union are promoted to the World Group in 1989.

Relegation Play-offs; 10–13 June
Budapest, Hungary (clay)
Belgium	2
Hungary	3
Sofia, Bulgaria (clay)
Bulgaria	0
Romania	5

- Belgium and Bulgaria are relegated to Group II in 1989.

== First round ==
=== Belgium vs. Finland ===
Belgium
1
Brussels, Belgium
6–8 May 1988
Clay

Finland
4

			1	2	3	4	5
1	(Belgium) (Finland)	Xavier Daufresne; Olli Rahnasto	6; 4	7; 5	3; 6	4; 6	6; 3
2	(Belgium) (Finland)	Denis Langaskens; Veli Paloheimo	1; 6	2; 6	5; 7
3	(Belgium) (Finland)	Karel Demuynck / Denis Langaskens; Veli Paloheimo / Olli Rahnasto	2; 6	7; 9	4; 6
4	(Belgium) (Finland)	Xavier Daufresne; Veli Paloheimo	1; 6	5; 7	3; 6
5	(Belgium) (Finland)	Denis Langaskens; Olli Rahnasto	0; 6	2; 6

=== Nigeria vs. Hungary ===
Nigeria
5
Lagos, Nigeria
6–8 May 1988
Hard

Hungary
0

			1	2	3	4	5
1	(Nigeria) (Hungary)	Nduka Odizor; András Lányi	5; 7	6; 3	6; 3	6; 1
2	(Nigeria) (Hungary)	Tony Mmoh; László Markovits	6; 1	6; 2	6; 4
3	(Nigeria) (Hungary)	Tony Mmoh / Nduka Odizor; András Lányi / László Markovits	7; 5	6; 3	2; 6	6; 4
4	(Nigeria) (Hungary)	Nduka Odizor; László Markovits	6; 3	6; 2
5	(Nigeria) (Hungary)	Tony Mmoh; András Lányi	4; 6	6; 3	7; 5

=== Senegal vs. Bulgaria ===
Senegal
4
Sporting Club de Dakar, Dakar, Senegal
6–8 May 1988
Hard

Bulgaria
1

			1	2	3	4	5
1	(Senegal) (Bulgaria)	Yahiya Doumbia; Julian Stamatov	6; 2	6; 2	6; 3
2	(Senegal) (Bulgaria)	Thierno Ly; Krassimir Lazarov	4; 6	5; 7	2; 6
3	(Senegal) (Bulgaria)	Abou Berthé / Yahiya Doumbia; Krassimir Lazarov / Julian Stamatov	5; 7	6; 4	6; 2	6; 2
4	(Senegal) (Bulgaria)	Thierno Ly; Julian Stamatov	8; 6	1; 6	6; 3	10; 8
5	(Senegal) (Bulgaria)	Yahiya Doumbia; Krassimir Lazarov	6; 1	6; 4

=== Romania vs. Portugal ===
Romania
2
Timișoara, Romania
6–8 May 1988
Clay

Portugal
3

			1	2	3	4	5
1	(Romania) (Portugal)	Florin Segărceanu; João Cunha e Silva	6; 1	0; 6	0; 6	2; 6
2	(Romania) (Portugal)	Adrian Marcu; Nuno Marques	7; 5	6; 4	4; 6	4; 6	6; 1
3	(Romania) (Portugal)	Adrian Marcu / Florin Segărceanu; Nuno Marques / João Cunha e Silva	4; 6	8; 10	2; 6
4	(Romania) (Portugal)	Adrian Marcu; João Cunha e Silva	4; 6	3; 6	3; 6
5	(Romania) (Portugal)	Mihai Vanta; Marco Seruca	6; 3	6; 0

== Second round ==
=== Great Britain vs. Finland ===
Great Britain
3
Bristol Lawn Tennis Club, Bristol, United Kingdom
9–12 June 1988
Grass

Finland
1

			1	2	3	4	5
1	(United Kingdom) (Finland)	Andrew Castle; Veli Paloheimo	5; 7	5; 7	3; 6
2	(United Kingdom) (Finland)	Jeremy Bates; Olli Rahnasto	6; 1	6; 1	6; 1
3	(United Kingdom) (Finland)	Jeremy Bates / Andrew Castle; Veli Paloheimo / Olli Rahnasto	14; 12	6; 3	6; 1
4	(United Kingdom) (Finland)	Jeremy Bates; Veli Paloheimo	6; 4	4; 6	7; 5	6; 1
5	(United Kingdom) (Finland)	Andrew Castle; Olli Rahnasto						not played

=== Austria vs. Nigeria ===
Austria
5
Villach, Austria
10–12 June 1988
Clay

Nigeria
0

			1	2	3	4	5
1	(Austria) (Nigeria)	Horst Skoff; Nduka Odizor	6; 2	6; 3	6; 3
2	(Austria) (Nigeria)	Thomas Muster; Tony Mmoh	6; 2	6; 4	6; 3
3	(Austria) (Nigeria)	Alex Antonitsch / Thomas Muster; Tony Mmoh / Nduka Odizor	12; 10	6; 3	6; 3
4	(Austria) (Nigeria)	Horst Skoff; Sadiq Abdullahi	6; 2	6; 0
5	(Austria) (Nigeria)	Thomas Muster; Nduka Odizor	6; 4	10; 8

=== Netherlands vs. Senegal ===
Netherlands
3
Warmond, Netherlands
10–12 June 1988
Clay

Senegal
2

			1	2	3	4	5
1	(Netherlands) (Senegal)	Tom Nijssen; Yahiya Doumbia	3; 6	6; 1	2; 6	5; 7
2	(Netherlands) (Senegal)	Menno Oosting; Abou Berthé	6; 0	6; 1	6; 3
3	(Netherlands) (Senegal)	Huub van Boeckel / Michiel Schapers; Yahiya Doumbia / Thierno Ly	6; 1	6; 2	6; 1
4	(Netherlands) (Senegal)	Tom Nijssen; Abou Berthé	6; 0	6; 1	6; 0
5	(Netherlands) (Senegal)	Menno Oosting; Yahiya Doumbia	4; 6	2; 6

=== Portugal vs. Soviet Union ===
Portugal
0
Estádio Nacional, Lisbon, Portugal
10–12 June 1988
Clay

Soviet Union
5

			1	2	3	4	5
1	(Portugal) (Soviet Union)	Nuno Marques; Andrei Chesnokov	3; 6	5; 7	2; 6
2	(Portugal) (Soviet Union)	João Cunha e Silva; Alexander Volkov	6; 3	3; 6	3; 6	3; 6
3	(Portugal) (Soviet Union)	Nuno Marques / João Cunha e Silva; Andrei Olhovskiy / Alexander Volkov	3; 6	6; 3	16; 14	3; 6	2; 6
4	(Portugal) (Soviet Union)	João Cunha e Silva; Andrei Chesnokov	3; 6	2; 6
5	(Portugal) (Soviet Union)	Marco Seruca; Alexander Volkov	3; 6	2; 6

== Relegation play-offs ==
=== Hungary vs. Belgium ===
Hungary
3
Budapest, Hungary
10–13 June 1988
Clay

Belgium
2

			1	2	3	4	5
1	(Hungary) (Belgium)	András Lányi; Bart Wuyts	6; 3	6; 4	6; 3
2	(Hungary) (Belgium)	Ferenc Csépai; Karel Demuynck	3; 6	3; 6	6; 2	3; 6
3	(Hungary) (Belgium)	Gábor Köves / László Markovits; Karel Demuynck / Denis Langaskens	4; 6	3; 6	8; 6	6; 4	6; 2
4	(Hungary) (Belgium)	Ferenc Csépai; Bart Wuyts	6; 3	1; 6	0; 6	6; 4	4; 6
5	(Hungary) (Belgium)	András Lányi; Xavier Daufresne	6; 4	5; 7	6; 2	6; 1

=== Bulgaria vs. Romania ===
Bulgaria
0
Sofia, Bulgaria
10–12 June 1988
Clay

Romania
5

			1	2	3	4	5
1	(Bulgaria) (Romania)	Krassimir Lazarov; Adrian Marcu	1; 6	2; 6	7; 5	1; 6
2	(Bulgaria) (Romania)	Julian Stamatov; Florin Segărceanu	1; 6	2; 6	0; 6
3	(Bulgaria) (Romania)	Julian Stamatov / Milen Velev; George Cosac / Florin Segărceanu	4; 6	1; 6	4; 6
4	(Bulgaria) (Romania)	Julian Stamatov; Adrian Marcu	3; 6	3; 6
5	(Bulgaria) (Romania)	Krassimir Lazarov; Florin Segărceanu	4; 6	3; 6

== Third round ==
=== Austria vs. Great Britain ===
Austria
5
Zell am See, Austria
22–24 July 1988
Clay

Great Britain
0

			1	2	3	4	5
1	(Austria) (United Kingdom)	Thomas Muster; Steve Shaw	6; 4	6; 2	6; 2
2	(Austria) (United Kingdom)	Horst Skoff; Jeremy Bates	6; 4	6; 4	0; 6	6; 0
3	(Austria) (United Kingdom)	Alex Antonitsch / Thomas Muster; Jeremy Bates / Andrew Castle	6; 3	6; 4	3; 6	6; 3
4	(Austria) (United Kingdom)	Horst Skoff; Steve Shaw	6; 4	7; 5
5	(Austria) (United Kingdom)	Thomas Muster; Richard Whichello	6; 1	6; 3

=== Soviet Union vs. Netherlands ===
Soviet Union
5
Jūrmala, Soviet Union
22–24 July 1988
Clay

Netherlands
0

			1	2	3	4	5
1	(Soviet Union) (Netherlands)	Andrei Cherkasov; Paul Dogger	6; 4	6; 1	9; 7
2	(Soviet Union) (Netherlands)	Andrei Chesnokov; Michiel Schapers	6; 2	6; 4	7; 5
3	(Soviet Union) (Netherlands)	Andrei Olhovskiy / Alexander Volkov; Huub van Boeckel / Mark Koevermans	11; 9	3; 6	4; 6	6; 3	7; 5
4	(Soviet Union) (Netherlands)	Andrei Cherkasov; Mark Koevermans	7; 5	3; 6	6; 1
5	(Soviet Union) (Netherlands)	Andrei Chesnokov; Paul Dogger	10; 8	6; 1
