= 1999 Davis Cup Europe/Africa Zone Group I =

International tennis competition

The Europe/Africa Zone was one of the three zones of the regional Davis Cup competition in 1999.

In the Europe/Africa Zone there were four different tiers, called groups, in which teams competed against each other to advance to the upper tier. Winners in Group I advanced to the World Group qualifying round, along with losing teams from the World Group first round. Teams who lost in the first round competed in the relegation play-offs, with winning teams remaining in Group I, whereas teams who lost their play-offs were relegated to the Europe/Africa Zone Group II in 2000.

== Participating nations ==
- Austria
- Belarus
- Croatia
- Finland
- Israel
- Portugal
- Romania
- South Africa
- Ukraine

=== Draw ===
Second Round Play-offs
Zagreb, Croatia (indoor carpet)
Croatia	1
Portugal	4
Kyiv, Ukraine (clay)
Israel	2
Ukraine	3

First Round Play-offs
bye
Croatia
bye
Portugal
Israel
bye
Ukraine
bye

First Round
Romania
bye
bye
Croatia
Austria
bye
bye
Portugal
Israel
bye
bye
Finland
Kyiv, Ukraine (indoor carpet)
Ukraine	2
Belarus	3
bye
South Africa

Second Round
Bucharest, Romania (clay)
Romania	3
Croatia	2
Wels, Austria (indoor clay)
Austria	4
Portugal	1
Helsinki, Finland (indoor carpet)
Israel	2
Finland	3
Cape Town, South Africa (hard)
Belarus	1
South Africa	4

- Croatia and Israel relegated to Group II in 2000.
- Romania, Austria, Finland, and South Africa advance to World Group qualifying round.

== First round ==
=== Ukraine vs. Belarus ===
Ukraine
2
Meridian Sports Complex, Kyiv, Ukraine
12–14 February 1999
Carpet (indoors)

Belarus
3

			1	2	3	4	5
1	(Ukraine) (Belarus)	Andrei Rybalko; Vladimir Voltchkov	2; 6	3; 6	5; 7
2	(Ukraine) (Belarus)	Andriy Medvedev; Max Mirnyi	3; 6	6; 3	7^{7} 6^{4}	7; 5
3	(Ukraine) (Belarus)	Andriy Medvedev / Orest Tereshchuk; Max Mirnyi / Vladimir Voltchkov	3; 6	1; 6	4; 6
4	(Ukraine) (Belarus)	Andriy Medvedev; Vladimir Voltchkov	5; 7	6; 3	6; 3	6; 3
5	(Ukraine) (Belarus)	Andrei Rybalko; Max Mirnyi	3; 6	0; 6	6; 3	3; 6

== Second round ==
=== Romania vs. Croatia ===
Romania
3
Arena Club, Bucharest, Romania
2–4 April 1999
Clay

Croatia
2

			1	2	3	4	5
1	(Romania) (Croatia)	Adrian Voinea; Ivan Ljubičić	6; 1	6; 4	6^{1} 7^{7}	7^{7} 6^{5}
2	(Romania) (Croatia)	Andrei Pavel; Željko Krajan	7^{7} 6^{5}	6; 2	6; 0
3	(Romania) (Croatia)	Andrei Pavel / Gabriel Trifu; Ivan Ljubičić / Lovro Zovko	7^{7} 6^{5}	7^{7} 6^{5}	7; 5
4	(Romania) (Croatia)	Ionuț Moldovan; Lovro Zovko	7; 5	1; 6	2; 6
5	(Romania) (Croatia)	Gabriel Trifu; Ivan Beroš	3; 6	2; 6

=== Austria vs. Portugal ===
Austria
4
Messe Wels, Wels, Austria
2–4 April 1999
Clay

Portugal
1

			1	2	3	4	5
1	(Austria) (Portugal)	Stefan Koubek; Nuno Marques	6; 3	6; 4	6; 4
2	(Austria) (Portugal)	Markus Hipfl; João Cunha e Silva	6; 4	6; 2	6; 2
3	(Austria) (Portugal)	Julian Knowle / Wolfgang Schranz; Emanuel Couto / Nuno Marques	6; 3	2; 6	7^{7} 6^{4}	4; 6	2; 6
4	(Austria) (Portugal)	Stefan Koubek; João Cunha e Silva	6; 3	7^{7} 6^{5}	6; 0
5	(Austria) (Portugal)	Markus Hipfl; Bruno Fragoso	6; 1	6; 2

=== Finland vs. Israel ===
Finland
3
Tali Tennis Centre, Helsinki, Finland
2–4 April 1999
Carpet (indoors)

Israel
2

			1	2	3	4	5
1	(Finland) (Israel)	Tuomas Ketola; Eyal Ran	3; 6	2; 6	4; 6
2	(Finland) (Israel)	Ville Liukko; Eyal Erlich	6; 1	6; 1	6; 3
3	(Finland) (Israel)	Tuomas Ketola / Ville Liukko; Amir Hadad / Harel Levy	0; 6	7; 5	6^{2} 7^{7}	6; 3	8; 6
4	(Finland) (Israel)	Ville Liukko; Eyal Ran	4; 6	7^{8} 6^{6}	6; 4	6; 4
5	(Finland) (Israel)	Tapio Nurminen; Eyal Erlich	2; 6	4; 6

=== South Africa vs. Belarus ===
South Africa
4
Rondebosch Stadium, Cape Town, South Africa
2–4 April 1999
Hard

Belarus
1

			1	2	3	4	5
1	(South Africa) (Belarus)	David Nainkin; Vladimir Voltchkov	6; 3	5; 7	4; 6	6^{5} 7^{7}
2	(South Africa) (Belarus)	Wayne Ferreira; Max Mirnyi	5; 7	6; 4	6; 3	6^{6} 7^{8}	9; 7
3	(South Africa) (Belarus)	David Adams / John-Laffnie de Jager; Max Mirnyi / Vladimir Voltchkov	6; 4	6; 3	6; 4
4	(South Africa) (Belarus)	Wayne Ferreira; Vladimir Voltchkov	6; 0	4; 6	3; 6	6; 2	6; 4
5	(South Africa) (Belarus)	David Nainkin; Sergei Samoseiko	6; 2	6; 2

== Second round relegation play-offs ==
=== Croatia vs. Portugal ===
Croatia
1
Dom Sportova, Zagreb, Croatia
24–26 September 1999
Carpet (indoors)

Portugal
4

			1	2	3	4	5
1	(Croatia) (Portugal)	Ivan Ljubičić; Nuno Marques	4; 6	4; 6	6; 3	3; 6
2	(Croatia) (Portugal)	Željko Krajan; João Cunha e Silva	6^{4} 7^{7}	2; 6	2; 6
3	(Croatia) (Portugal)	Ivan Ljubičić / Lovro Zovko; Emanuel Couto / Nuno Marques	7^{7} 6^{4}	6; 4	6^{8} 7^{10}	4; 6	2; 6
4	(Croatia) (Portugal)	Mario Ančić; João Cunha e Silva	4; 6	4; 6
5	(Croatia) (Portugal)	Lovro Zovko; Bernardo Mota	6^{4} 7^{7}	6; 4	6; 4

=== Ukraine vs. Israel ===
Ukraine
3
Nauka Tennis Centre, Kyiv, Ukraine
24–26 September 1999
Clay

Israel
2

			1	2	3	4	5
1	(Ukraine) (Israel)	Andrei Rybalko; Harel Levy	2; 6	1; 6	2; 6
2	(Ukraine) (Israel)	Andriy Medvedev; Noam Okun	6; 0	6; 4	7^{7} 6^{2}
3	(Ukraine) (Israel)	Andriy Medvedev / Andrei Rybalko; Harel Levy / Eyal Ran	6; 3	6; 4	6; 4
4	(Ukraine) (Israel)	Andriy Medvedev; Harel Levy	7; 5	4; 6	6; 3	6; 2
5	(Ukraine) (Israel)	Orest Tereshchuk; Noam Okun	3; 6	5; 7
