= 2001 Davis Cup Europe/Africa Zone Group I =

International tennis competition

The Europe/Africa Zone was one of the three zones of the regional Davis Cup competition in 2001.

In the Europe/Africa Zone there were four different tiers, called groups, in which teams competed against each other to advance to the upper tier. Winners in Group I advanced to the World Group qualifying round, along with losing teams from the World Group first round. Teams who lost in the first round competed in the relegation play-offs, with winning teams remaining in Group I, whereas teams who lost their play-offs were relegated to the Europe/Africa Zone Group II in 2002.

== Participating nations ==
- Austria
- Belarus
- Croatia
- Finland
- Great Britain
- Italy
- Portugal
- Slovenia
- Ukraine
- Zimbabwe

=== Draw ===
Second Round Play-offs
Wels, Austria (indoor hard)
Ukraine	1
Austria	4
Harare, Zimbabwe (indoor hard)
Zimbabwe	3
Slovenia	2

First Round Play-offs
bye
Ukraine
Austria
bye
bye
Zimbabwe
Slovenia
bye

First Round
Great Britain
bye
Maia, Portugal (clay)
Ukraine	2
Portugal	3
Austria
bye
bye
Croatia
Belarus
bye
bye
Zimbabwe
Helsinki, Finland (indoor carpet)
Slovenia	2
Finland	3
bye
Italy

Second Round
Solihull, England (indoor carpet)
Great Britain	5
Portugal	0
Pula, Croatia (indoor carpet)
Austria	1
Croatia	4
Minsk, Belarus (indoor carpet)
Belarus	3
Zimbabwe	2
Helsinki, Finland (indoor carpet)
Finland	2
Italy	3

- Ukraine and Slovenia relegated to Group II in 2002.
- Great Britain, Croatia, Belarus, and Italy advance to World Group qualifying round.

== First round ==
=== Portugal vs. Ukraine ===
Portugal
3
Maia Tennis Complex, Maia, Portugal
9–11 February 2001
Clay

Ukraine
2

			1	2	3	4	5
1	(Portugal) (Ukraine)	Emanuel Couto; Andriy Medvedev	7; 5	1; 6	3; 6	2; 6
2	(Portugal) (Ukraine)	Bernardo Mota; Andrei Dernovskiy	3; 6	6; 4	6; 3	3; 6	6; 1
3	(Portugal) (Ukraine)	Emanuel Couto / Nuno Marques; Andrei Dernovskiy / Andriy Medvedev	6; 4	4; 6	7; 5	6; 4
4	(Portugal) (Ukraine)	Bernardo Mota; Andriy Medvedev	0; 6	1; 6	2; 6
5	(Portugal) (Ukraine)	Emanuel Couto; Andrei Dernovskiy	6; 3	6; 4	7^{9} 6^{7}

=== Finland vs. Slovenia ===
Finland
3
Tali Tennis Centre, Helsinki, Finland
9–11 February 2001
Carpet (indoors)

Slovenia
2

			1	2	3	4	5
1	(Finland) (Slovenia)	Tuomas Ketola; Andrej Kračman	6; 3	6; 3	6; 4
2	(Finland) (Slovenia)	Jarkko Nieminen; Marko Tkalec	6; 4	6; 2	6; 2
3	(Finland) (Slovenia)	Ville Liukko / Jarkko Nieminen; Andrej Kračman / Borut Urh	4; 6	7^{7} 6^{2}	7^{7} 6^{4}	6^{3} 7^{7}	4; 6
4	(Finland) (Slovenia)	Tuomas Ketola; Marko Tkalec	2; 6	6^{1} 7^{7}	3; 2			retired
5	(Finland) (Slovenia)	Jarkko Nieminen; Andrej Kračman	6; 3	6; 1	7; 5

== Second round ==
=== Great Britain vs. Portugal ===
Great Britain
5
National Exhibition Centre, Solihull, England
6–8 April 2001
Carpet (indoors)

Portugal
0

			1	2	3	4	5
1	(United Kingdom) (Portugal)	Tim Henman; Tiago Vinhas Sousa	6; 2	6; 1	6; 1
2	(United Kingdom) (Portugal)	Greg Rusedski; Emanuel Couto	6; 3	6^{3} 7^{7}	6; 1	6; 2
3	(United Kingdom) (Portugal)	Tim Henman / Greg Rusedski; Emanuel Couto / António van Grichen	6; 1	7^{7} 6^{5}	7^{10} 6^{8}
4	(United Kingdom) (Portugal)	Martin Lee; António van Grichen	6; 2	6; 0
5	(United Kingdom) (Portugal)	Lee Childs; Tiago Vinhas Sousa	6; 1	6; 4

=== Croatia vs. Austria ===
Croatia
4
Dom Mladosti Hall, Pula, Croatia
6–8 April 2001
Carpet (indoors)

Austria
1

			1	2	3	4	5
1	(Croatia) (Austria)	Goran Ivanišević; Stefan Koubek	6; 4	6; 3	7^{7} 6^{3}
2	(Croatia) (Austria)	Ivan Ljubičić; Julian Knowle	4; 6	6^{5} 7^{7}	6^{3} 7^{7}
3	(Croatia) (Austria)	Goran Ivanišević / Ivan Ljubičić; Julian Knowle / Jürgen Melzer	6; 4	7^{9} 6^{7}	4; 6	6; 3
4	(Croatia) (Austria)	Ivan Ljubičić; Stefan Koubek	5; 7	6; 3	7^{7} 6^{3}	6; 3
5	(Croatia) (Austria)	Mario Ančić; Clemens Trimmel	4; 6	6; 3	7^{7} 6^{4}

=== Belarus vs. Zimbabwe ===
Belarus
3
Olympic Tennis Centre, Minsk, Belarus
6–8 April 2001
Carpet (indoors)

Zimbabwe
2

			1	2	3	4	5
1	(Belarus) (Zimbabwe)	Vladimir Voltchkov; Wayne Black	2; 3					retired
2	(Belarus) (Zimbabwe)	Max Mirnyi; Byron Black	6; 3	7; 5	6; 0
3	(Belarus) (Zimbabwe)	Max Mirnyi / Alexander Shvets; Wayne Black / Kevin Ullyett	7^{8} 6^{6}	5; 7	3; 6	6^{5} 7^{7}
4	(Belarus) (Zimbabwe)	Alexander Shvets; Byron Black	6; 4	7^{7} 6^{5}	6; 1
5	(Belarus) (Zimbabwe)	Max Mirnyi; Kevin Ullyett	6; 3	7^{7} 6^{4}	7; 5

=== Finland vs. Italy ===
Finland
2
Tali Tennis Centre, Helsinki, Finland
6–8 April 2001
Carpet (indoors)

Italy
3

			1	2	3	4	5
1	(Finland) (Italy)	Ville Liukko; Federico Luzzi	4; 6	6^{7} 7^{9}	6; 4	6; 3	12; 14
2	(Finland) (Italy)	Jarkko Nieminen; Mosé Navarra	6; 3	6^{1} 7^{7}	2; 6	4; 6
3	(Finland) (Italy)	Tuomas Ketola / Jarkko Nieminen; Mosé Navarra / Vincenzo Santopadre	5; 7	5; 7	4; 6
4	(Finland) (Italy)	Jarkko Nieminen; Filippo Volandri	6; 3	7; 5
5	(Finland) (Italy)	Tapio Nurminen; Vincenzo Santopadre	6; 3	6; 4

== Second round relegation play-offs ==
=== Austria vs. Ukraine ===
Austria
4
Bosch-Halle, Wels, Austria
21–23 September 2001
Hard (indoors)

Ukraine
1

			1	2	3	4	5
1	(Austria) (Ukraine)	Stefan Koubek; Andrei Dernovskiy	6; 0	6; 3	3; 6	6; 1
2	(Austria) (Ukraine)	Markus Hipfl; Orest Tereshchuk	6; 3	6; 1	6; 1
3	(Austria) (Ukraine)	Julian Knowle / Jürgen Melzer; Andrei Dernovskiy / Orest Tereshchuk	6^{6} 7^{8}	6; 2	3; 6	6; 1	3; 6
4	(Austria) (Ukraine)	Markus Hipfl; Andriy Medvedev	6; 4	4; 6	6; 0	6; 4
5	(Austria) (Ukraine)	Stefan Koubek; Taras Demyanenko	6; 0	6; 3

=== Zimbabwe vs. Slovenia ===
Zimbabwe
3
City Sports Centre, Harare, Zimbabwe
21–23 September 2001
Hard (indoors)

Slovenia
2

			1	2	3	4	5
1	(Zimbabwe) (Slovenia)	Kevin Ullyett; Marko Tkalec	7; 5	7; 5	6; 4
2	(Zimbabwe) (Slovenia)	Wayne Black; Iztok Božič	7^{7} 6^{4}	4; 6	6; 3	3; 6	4; 6
3	(Zimbabwe) (Slovenia)	Wayne Black / Kevin Ullyett; Boštjan Ošabnik / Matija Zgaga	6; 3	6; 3	6; 3
4	(Zimbabwe) (Slovenia)	Wayne Black; Marko Tkalec	6; 4	6; 4	2; 6	6; 4
5	(Zimbabwe) (Slovenia)	Genius Chidzikwe; Iztok Božič	6; 3	1; 6	4; 6
