= 1999 Davis Cup World Group qualifying round =

The 1999 Davis Cup World Group qualifying round was held from 24 to 26 September. They were the main play-offs of the 1999 Davis Cup. The winners of the playoffs advanced to the 2000 Davis Cup World Group, and the losers were relegated to their respective Zonal Regions I.

== Teams ==
Bold indicates team had qualified for the 2000 Davis Cup World Group.

From World Group

- **Czech Republic**
- **Germany**
- **Great Britain**
- **Italy**
- **Netherlands**
- **Spain**
- Sweden
- **Zimbabwe**

From Americas Group I

- Chile
- Ecuador

From Asia/Oceania Group I

- New Zealand
- Uzbekistan

From Europe/Africa Group I

- **Austria**
- Finland
- Romania
- South Africa

== Results summary ==
Date: 24–26 September

The eight losing teams in the World Group first round ties and eight winners of the Zonal Group I final round ties competed in the World Group qualifying round for spots in the 2000 World Group.

Home team	Score	Visiting team	Location	Venue	Door	Surface	Ref.
**Austria**	3-2	Sweden	Pörtschach	Werzer Arena	Outdoor	Clay	
**Zimbabwe**	4-1	Chile	Harare	Harare Municipal Centre	Indoor	Hard	
Uzbekistan	0-5	**Czech Republic**	Tashkent	Yunusabad Tennis Centre	Indoor	Hard	
Ecuador	2-3	**Netherlands**	Guayaquil	Club Nacional de Guayaquil	Outdoor	Clay	
New Zealand	0-5	**Spain**	Hamilton	Mystery Creek Events Centre	Indoor	Hard	
**Italy**	3-2	Finland	Sassari	Torres Tennis Sassari	Outdoor	Clay	
**Great Britain**	4-1	South Africa	Birmingham	National Indoor Arena	Indoor	Hard	
Romania	1-4	**Germany**	Bucharest	Arena Club	Outdoor	Clay	

- Czech Republic, Germany, Great Britain, Italy, Netherlands, Spain and Zimbabwe remain in the World Group in 2000.
- Austria are promoted to the World Group in 2000.
- Chile, Ecuador, Finland, New Zealand, Romania, South Africa and Uzbekistan remain in Zonal Group I in 2000.
- Sweden are relegated to Zonal Group I in 2000.

== Qualifying results ==
=== Austria vs. Sweden ===
Austria
3
Werzer Arena, Pörtschach, Austria
24–26 September 1999
Clay

Sweden
2

			1	2	3	4	5
1	(Austria) (Sweden)	**Markus Hipfl**; Magnus Norman	**6**; 4	**6**; 3	**6**; 4
2	(Austria) (Sweden)	**Stefan Koubek**; Magnus Gustafsson	**6**; 4	4; **6**	**6**; 4	4; **6**	**10**; 8
3	(Austria) (Sweden)	Jürgen Melzer / Alexander Peya; **Nicklas Kulti / Mikael Tillström**	3; **6**	1; **6**	4; **6**
4	(Austria) (Sweden)	Stefan Koubek; **Magnus Norman**	**7^{7}** 6^{5}	1; **6**	4; **6**	2; **6**
5	(Austria) (Sweden)	**Markus Hipfl**; Magnus Gustafsson	**6**; 1	**6**; 2	**7**; 5

=== Zimbabwe vs. Chile ===
Zimbabwe
4
Harare Municipal Centre, Harare, Zimbabwe
24–26 September 1999
Hard (indoors)

Chile
1

			1	2	3	4	5
1	(Zimbabwe) (Chile)	**Byron Black**; Nicolás Massú	4; **6**	5; **7**	**6**; 4	**6**; 2	**6**; 3
2	(Zimbabwe) (Chile)	**Wayne Black**; Marcelo Ríos	**7**; 5	5; **7**	**7^{7}** 6^{3}	**7^{7}** 6^{4}
3	(Zimbabwe) (Chile)	Byron Black / Wayne Black; **Fernando González / Nicolás Massú**	**6**; 3	2; **6**	**6**; 4	2; **6**	4; **6**
4	(Zimbabwe) (Chile)	**Byron Black**; Marcelo Ríos	**7^{7}** 6^{3}	3; **6**	**6**; 2	**7^{8}** 6^{6}
5	(Zimbabwe) (Chile)	**Kevin Ullyett**; Nicolás Massú	**7^{7}** 6^{5}	**7^{7}** 6^{4}

=== Uzbekistan vs. Czech Republic ===
Uzbekistan
0
Yunusabad Tennis Centre, Tashkent, Uzbekistan
24–26 September 1999
Hard (indoors)

Czech Republic
5

			1	2	3	4	5
1	(Uzbekistan) (Czech Republic)	Vadim Kutsenko; **Jiří Novák**	3; **6**	3; **6**	2; **6**
2	(Uzbekistan) (Czech Republic)	Oleg Ogorodov; **Daniel Vacek**	5; **7**	3; **6**	4; **6**
3	(Uzbekistan) (Czech Republic)	Vadim Kutsenko / Oleg Ogorodov; **Jiří Novák / David Rikl**	3; **6**	2; **6**	6^{3} **7^{7}**
4	(Uzbekistan) (Czech Republic)	Oleg Ogorodov; **Petr Kralert**	3; **6**	2; **6**
5	(Uzbekistan) (Czech Republic)	Vadim Kutsenko; **David Rikl**	**6**; 4	2; **6**	3; **6**

=== Ecuador vs. Netherlands ===
Ecuador
2
Club Nacional de Guayaquil, Guayaquil, Ecuador
24–26 September 1999
Clay

Netherlands
3

			1	2	3	4	5
1	(Ecuador) (Netherlands)	**Nicolás Lapentti**; Jan Siemerink	**6**; 4	4; **6**	**6**; 3	**6**; 2
2	(Ecuador) (Netherlands)	Luis Morejón; **Sjeng Schalken**	6^{9} **7^{11}**	2; **6**	0; **6**
3	(Ecuador) (Netherlands)	Andrés Gómez / Nicolás Lapentti; **Paul Haarhuis / Jan Siemerink**	5; **7**	3; **6**	5; **7**
4	(Ecuador) (Netherlands)	**Nicolás Lapentti**; Sjeng Schalken	1; **6**	3; **6**	**6**; 0	**7^{7}** 6^{5}	**6**; 3
5	(Ecuador) (Netherlands)	Luis Morejón; **Jan Siemerink**	4; **6**	5; **7**	**6**; 3	3; **6**

=== New Zealand vs. Spain ===
New Zealand
0
Mystery Creek Events Centre, Hamilton, New Zealand
24–26 September 1999
Hard (indoors)

Spain
5

			1	2	3	4	5
1	(New Zealand) (Spain)	Mark Nielsen; **Félix Mantilla**	2; **6**	**6**; 3	**6**; 4	6^{2} **7^{7}**	3; **6**
2	(New Zealand) (Spain)	Brett Steven; **Francisco Clavet**	2; **6**	4; **6**	4; **6**
3	(New Zealand) (Spain)	James Greenhalgh / Brett Steven; **Julián Alonso / Joan Balcells**	6^{5} **7^{7}**	6^{1} **7^{7}**	4; **6**
4	(New Zealand) (Spain)	James Greenhalgh; **Julián Alonso**	**6**; 3	1; **6**	3; **6**
5	(New Zealand) (Spain)	Mark Nielsen; **Francisco Clavet**	0; **6**	4; **6**

=== Italy vs. Finland ===
Italy
3
Torres Tennis Sassari, Sassari, Italy
24–26 September 1999
Clay

Finland
2

			1	2	3	4	5
1	(Italy) (Finland)	**Andrea Gaudenzi**; Jarkko Nieminen	**6**; 2	**6**; 3	**7**; 5
2	(Italy) (Finland)	Davide Sanguinetti; **Ville Liukko**	3; **6**	**6**; 1	6^{2} **7^{7}**	**6**; 4	3; **6**
3	(Italy) (Finland)	Andrea Gaudenzi / Diego Nargiso; **Tuomas Ketola / Ville Liukko**	**6**; 1	4; **6**	4; **6**	**6**; 4	2; **6**
4	(Italy) (Finland)	**Andrea Gaudenzi**; Ville Liukko	**6**; 3	6^{5} **7^{7}**	2; **6**	**6**; 1	**6**; 3
5	(Italy) (Finland)	**Davide Sanguinetti**; Tuomas Ketola	**6**; 2	**6**; 2	1; **6**	**6**; 1

=== Great Britain vs. South Africa ===
Great Britain
4
National Indoor Arena, Birmingham, England
24–26 September 1999
Hard (indoors)

South Africa
1

			1	2	3	4	5
1	(United Kingdom) (South Africa)	**Greg Rusedski**; Neville Godwin	**6**; 4	4; **6**	**6**; 4	**6**; 3
2	(United Kingdom) (South Africa)	**Tim Henman**; Grant Stafford	**6**; 3	**7**; 5	**7^{8}** 6^{6}
3	(United Kingdom) (South Africa)	Neil Broad / Tim Henman; **David Adams / John-Laffnie de Jager**	3; **6**	6^{4} **7^{7}**	4; **6**
4	(United Kingdom) (South Africa)	**Tim Henman**; Neville Godwin	**6**; 2	**6**; 2	**6**; 2
5	(United Kingdom) (South Africa)	**Greg Rusedski**; Grant Stafford	**6**; 4	**7**; 5

=== Romania vs. Germany ===
Romania
1
Arena Club, Bucharest, Romania
24–26 September 1999
Clay

Germany
4

			1	2	3	4	5
1	(Romania) (Germany)	Adrian Voinea; **Tommy Haas**	5; **7**	2; **6**	**6**; 3	1; **6**
2	(Romania) (Germany)	**Andrei Pavel**; Rainer Schüttler	**7^{7}** 6^{2}	**6**; 2	**6**; 2
3	(Romania) (Germany)	Andrei Pavel / Gabriel Trifu; **Marc-Kevin Goellner / David Prinosil**	4; **6**	0; **6**	3; **6**
4	(Romania) (Germany)	Andrei Pavel; **Tommy Haas**	4; **6**	2; **6**	6^{4} **7^{7}**
5	(Romania) (Germany)	Adrian Voinea; **Marc-Kevin Goellner**	4; **6**	6^{6} **7^{8}**
