= 2000 Davis Cup Europe/Africa Zone Group I =

International tennis competition

The Europe/Africa Zone was one of the three zones of the regional Davis Cup competition in 2000.

In the Europe/Africa Zone there were four different tiers, called groups, in which teams competed against each other to advance to the upper tier. Winners in Group I advanced to the World Group qualifying round, along with losing teams from the World Group first round. Teams who lost in the first round competed in the relegation play-offs, with winning teams remaining in Group I, whereas teams who lost their play-offs were relegated to the Europe/Africa Zone Group II in 2001.

== Participating nations ==
- Belarus
- Finland
- Hungary
- Morocco
- Portugal
- Romania
- South Africa
- Sweden
- Ukraine

=== Draw ===
Second Round Play-offs
Helsinki, Finland (indoor carpet)
Finland	4
Hungary	1
Maia, Portugal (clay)
South Africa	2
Portugal	3

First Round Play-offs
bye
Finland
bye
Hungary
bye
South Africa
Portugal
bye

First Round
Sweden
bye
bye
Finland
Romania
bye
bye
Hungary
Belarus
bye
bye
South Africa
Kyiv, Ukraine (indoor carpet)
Portugal	1
Ukraine	4
bye
Morocco

Second Round
Helsinki, Finland (indoor hard)
Sweden	3
Finland	2
Bucharest, Romania (indoor carpet)
Romania	3
Hungary	2
Minsk, Belarus (indoor carpet)
Belarus	4
South Africa	1
Casablanca, Morocco (clay)
Ukraine	2
Morocco	3

- Hungary and South Africa relegated to Group II in 2001.
- Sweden, Romania, Belarus, and Morocco advance to World Group qualifying round.

== First round ==
=== Ukraine vs. Portugal ===
Ukraine
4
Meridian Complex, Kyiv, Ukraine
4–6 February 2000
Carpet (indoors)

Portugal
1

			1	2	3	4	5
1	(Ukraine) (Portugal)	Andrei Dernovskiy; João Cunha e Silva	7^{8} 6^{6}	6; 4	3; 6	3; 6	6; 4
2	(Ukraine) (Portugal)	Andriy Medvedev; Bernardo Mota	6; 1	6; 3	4; 6	6; 2
3	(Ukraine) (Portugal)	Andriy Medvedev / Andrei Rybalko; Emanuel Couto / João Cunha e Silva	7; 5	6; 4	6; 4
4	(Ukraine) (Portugal)	Orest Tereshchuk; João Cunha e Silva	6; 3	6; 4
5	(Ukraine) (Portugal)	Andrei Dernovskiy; Bernardo Mota	5; 7	6; 3	6^{5} 7^{7}

== Second round ==
=== Finland vs. Sweden ===
Finland
2
Tali Tennis Centre, Helsinki, Finland
7–9 April 2000
Hard (indoors)

Sweden
3

			1	2	3	4	5
1	(Finland) (Sweden)	Ville Liukko; Magnus Norman	3; 6	6; 4	1; 6	6^{7} 7^{9}
2	(Finland) (Sweden)	Tuomas Ketola; Mikael Tillström	6; 3	3; 6	4; 6	6; 4	6; 3
3	(Finland) (Sweden)	Tuomas Ketola / Ville Liukko; Nicklas Kulti / Mikael Tillström	1; 6	1; 6	4; 6
4	(Finland) (Sweden)	Tuomas Ketola; Magnus Norman	2; 6	4; 6	1; 6
5	(Finland) (Sweden)	Jarkko Nieminen; Mikael Tillström	6; 1	6; 4

=== Romania vs. Hungary ===
Romania
3
Sala Polivalentă, Bucharest, Romania
7–9 April 2000
Carpet (indoors)

Hungary
2

			1	2	3	4	5
1	(Romania) (Hungary)	Andrei Pavel; Gergely Kisgyörgy	6; 2	7^{7} 6^{5}	5; 7	6^{8} 7^{10}	6; 2
2	(Romania) (Hungary)	Răzvan Sabău; Attila Sávolt	4; 6	3; 6	2; 6
3	(Romania) (Hungary)	Dinu Pescariu / Gabriel Trifu; Gábor Köves / Attila Sávolt	1; 6	7; 5	3; 6	6; 3	5; 7
4	(Romania) (Hungary)	Andrei Pavel; Attila Sávolt	6; 4	1; 6	6; 4	6; 2
5	(Romania) (Hungary)	Dinu Pescariu; Gergely Kisgyörgy	6; 3	7; 5	6^{3} 7^{7}	6; 4

=== Belarus vs. South Africa ===
Belarus
4
National Centre, Minsk, Belarus
7–9 April 2000
Carpet (indoors)

South Africa
1

			1	2	3	4	5
1	(Belarus) (South Africa)	Vladimir Voltchkov; Neville Godwin	6; 2	7^{7} 6^{2}	7; 5
2	(Belarus) (South Africa)	Max Mirnyi; Jeff Coetzee	6; 3	6; 2	6; 4
3	(Belarus) (South Africa)	Sergei Samoseiko / Alexander Shvets; David Adams / John-Laffnie de Jager	6^{2} 7^{7}	1; 6	3; 6
4	(Belarus) (South Africa)	Max Mirnyi; Neville Godwin	6; 4	6; 3	6; 4
5	(Belarus) (South Africa)	Vladimir Voltchkov; Jeff Coetzee	6; 1	6; 2

=== Morocco vs. Ukraine ===
Morocco
3
Club Olympique, Casablanca, Morocco
7–9 April 2000
Clay

Ukraine
2

			1	2	3	4	5
1	(Morocco) (Ukraine)	Hicham Arazi; Andriy Medvedev	4; 6	6; 1	2; 6	6; 3	5; 7
2	(Morocco) (Ukraine)	Younes El Aynaoui; Andrei Dernovskiy	6; 2	6; 2	6; 3
3	(Morocco) (Ukraine)	Karim Alami / Hicham Arazi; Andriy Medvedev / Andrei Rybalko	3; 6	6; 1	7; 5	6; 3
4	(Morocco) (Ukraine)	Younes El Aynaoui; Andriy Medvedev	5; 7	5; 7	2; 6
5	(Morocco) (Ukraine)	Hicham Arazi; Orest Tereshchuk	6; 4	6; 0	6; 1

== Second round relegation play-offs ==
=== Finland vs. Hungary ===
Finland
4
Tali Tennis Centre, Helsinki, Finland
6–8 October 2000
Carpet (indoors)

Hungary
1

			1	2	3	4	5
1	(Finland) (Hungary)	Ville Liukko; Gergely Kisgyörgy	6; 1	6; 3	6; 3
2	(Finland) (Hungary)	Jarkko Nieminen; Attila Sávolt	6; 2	1; 6	7^{7} 6^{5}	6; 0
3	(Finland) (Hungary)	Tuomas Ketola / Ville Liukko; Gábor Köves / Attila Sávolt	6; 4	6^{5} 7^{7}	4; 6	5; 7
4	(Finland) (Hungary)	Ville Liukko; Attila Sávolt	2; 6	5; 7	6; 4	6; 4	6; 4
5	(Finland) (Hungary)	Jarkko Nieminen; Gergely Kisgyörgy	6; 3	6; 2

=== Portugal vs. South Africa ===
Portugal
3
Maia Tennis Club, Maia, Portugal
6–8 October 2000
Clay

South Africa
2

			1	2	3	4	5
1	(Portugal) (South Africa)	Bernardo Mota; Justin Bower	6; 4	6; 1	7; 5
2	(Portugal) (South Africa)	Emanuel Couto; Wayne Ferreira	1; 6	4; 6	4; 6
3	(Portugal) (South Africa)	Emanuel Couto / Nuno Marques; John-Laffnie de Jager / Piet Norval	4; 6	7^{9} 6^{7}	6; 3	3; 6	8; 6
4	(Portugal) (South Africa)	Bernardo Mota; Wayne Ferreira	3; 6	2; 6	6; 4	3; 6
5	(Portugal) (South Africa)	Emanuel Couto; Justin Bower	7^{7} 6^{4}	4; 6	4; 6	7^{8} 6^{6}	6; 4
