= 1990 Davis Cup Europe/Africa Zone Group I =

International tennis competition

The Europe/Africa Zone was one of the three zones of the regional Davis Cup competition in 1990.

In the Europe/Africa Zone there were two different tiers, called groups, in which teams competed against each other to advance to the upper tier. Winners in Group I advanced to the World Group qualifying round, along with losing teams from the World Group first round. Teams who lost in the first round competed in the relegation play-offs, with winning teams remaining in Group I, whereas teams who lost their play-offs were relegated to the Europe/Africa Zone Group IIs in 1991.

== Participating nations ==
- Belgium
- Denmark
- Finland
- Ghana
- Great Britain
- Hungary
- Ireland
- Nigeria
- Portugal
- Romania
- Soviet Union

=== Draw ===
First Round
Soviet Union
bye
Accra, Ghana (hard)
Portugal	5
Ghana	0
Dublin, Ireland (indoor carpet)
Ireland	2
Romania	3
bye
Great Britain
Hungary
bye
bye
Belgium
Lagos, Nigeria (hard)
Finland	4
Nigeria	1
bye
Denmark

Second Round
Kyiv, Soviet Union (indoor clay)
Soviet Union	4
Portugal	1
Bucharest, Romania (clay)
Romania	2
Great Britain	3
Brussels, Belgium (clay)
Hungary	1
Belgium	4
Aarhus, Denmark (indoor carpet)
Finland	3
Denmark	2

- Soviet Union, Great Britain, Belgium and Finland advance to World Group qualifying round.

Relegation Play-off
Accra, Ghana (hard)
Ghana	2
Ireland	3

- Ghana and Nigeria relegated to Group II in 1991.

== First round ==
=== Ghana vs. Portugal ===
Ghana
0
Accra Sports Stadium, Accra, Ghana
2–4 February 1990
Hard

Portugal
5

			1	2	3	4	5
1	(Ghana) (Portugal)	Kojo Atiso; João Cunha e Silva	4; 6	4; 6	0; 6
2	(Ghana) (Portugal)	Franklyn Ofori; Nuno Marques	6^{4} 7^{7}	4; 6	3; 6
3	(Ghana) (Portugal)	Kojo Atiso / Franklyn Ofori; Nuno Marques / João Cunha e Silva	3; 6	4; 6	3; 6
4	(Ghana) (Portugal)	Franklyn Ofori; João Cunha e Silva	6; 4	6^{6} 7^{8}	13; 15
5	(Ghana) (Portugal)	Kojo Atiso; Nuno Marques	1; 6	5; 7

=== Ireland vs. Romania ===
Ireland
2
Fitzwilliam Lawn Tennis Club, Dublin, Ireland
2–4 February 1990
Carpet (indoors)

Romania
3

			1	2	3	4	5
1	(Republic of Ireland) (Romania)	Eoin Collins; George Cosac	6; 4	6; 4	3; 6	3; 6	9; 7
2	(Republic of Ireland) (Romania)	Peter Wright; Adrian Marcu	6; 4	2; 6	6; 3	7^{7} 6^{5}
3	(Republic of Ireland) (Romania)	Owen Casey / Peter Wright; George Cosac / Florin Segărceanu	1; 6	6^{6} 7^{8}	6; 4	6^{6} 7^{8}
4	(Republic of Ireland) (Romania)	Eoin Collins; Adrian Marcu	6^{10} 7^{12}	7^{7} 6^{5}	1; 6	4; 6
5	(Republic of Ireland) (Romania)	Peter Wright; George Cosac	6; 3	6; 4	3; 6	4; 6	3; 6

=== Nigeria vs. Finland ===
Nigeria
1
Lagos Lawn Tennis Club, Lagos, Nigeria
2–4 February 1990
Hard

Finland
4

			1	2	3	4	5
1	(Nigeria) (Finland)	Segun Akinloye; Veli Paloheimo	0; 6	3; 6	3; 6
2	(Nigeria) (Finland)	Nduka Odizor; Aki Rahunen	6^{3} 7^{7}	1; 6	0; 6
3	(Nigeria) (Finland)	Nduka Odizor / Yakubu Suleiman; Veli Paloheimo / Olli Rahnasto	3; 6	6; 2	7^{7} 6^{4}	4; 6	4; 6
4	(Nigeria) (Finland)	Segun Akinloye; Aki Rahunen	6^{4} 7^{7}	3; 6
5	(Nigeria) (Finland)	Nduka Odizor; Veli Paloheimo	2; 6	6; 2	6; 2

== Second round ==
=== Soviet Union vs. Portugal ===
Soviet Union
4
Nauka Tennis and Sports Complex, Kyiv, Soviet Union
4–6 May 1990
Clay (indoors)

Portugal
1

			1	2	3	4	5
1	(Soviet Union) (Portugal)	Andrei Cherkasov; Nuno Marques	7^{7} 6^{4}	6; 2	2; 6	3; 6	4; 6
2	(Soviet Union) (Portugal)	Andrei Chesnokov; João Cunha e Silva	6; 3	6; 2	7; 5
3	(Soviet Union) (Portugal)	Andrei Chesnokov / Dimitri Poliakov; Nuno Marques / João Cunha e Silva	7^{9} 6^{7}	6; 3	7^{7} 6^{3}
4	(Soviet Union) (Portugal)	Andrei Chesnokov; Nuno Marques	6; 4	3; 6	6; 3	6; 4
5	(Soviet Union) (Portugal)	Andrei Cherkasov; João Cunha e Silva	6; 2	6; 2

=== Romania vs. Great Britain ===
Romania
2
Club Sportiv Progresul, Bucharest, Romania
4–6 May 1990
Clay

Great Britain
3

			1	2	3	4	5
1	(Romania) (United Kingdom)	George Cosac; Danny Sapsford	6; 4	1; 6	2; 6	3; 6
2	(Romania) (United Kingdom)	Florin Segărceanu; Jeremy Bates	7; 5	6; 1	6; 1
3	(Romania) (United Kingdom)	George Cosac / Florin Segărceanu; Jeremy Bates / Andrew Castle	3; 6	3; 6	2; 6
4	(Romania) (United Kingdom)	George Cosac; Jeremy Bates	6; 3	1; 6	2; 6	2; 6
5	(Romania) (United Kingdom)	Florin Segărceanu; Danny Sapsford	6; 3	4; 6	6; 3

=== Belgium vs. Hungary ===
Belgium
4
Royal Primerose Tennis Club, Brussels, Belgium
4–6 May 1990
Clay

Hungary
1

			1	2	3	4	5
1	(Belgium) (Hungary)	Eduardo Masso; Sándor Noszály	6^{4} 7^{7}	6; 2	6; 4	7^{7} 6^{2}
2	(Belgium) (Hungary)	Bart Wuyts; András Lányi	6; 1	6; 1	6; 2
3	(Belgium) (Hungary)	Xavier Daufresne / Denis Langaskens; András Lányi / László Markovits	4; 6	3; 6	6; 4	6^{3} 7^{7}
4	(Belgium) (Hungary)	Eduardo Masso; András Lányi	6; 2	4; 6	7; 5	6; 3
5	(Belgium) (Hungary)	Bart Wuyts; Sándor Noszály	6; 1	6; 1

=== Denmark vs. Finland ===
Denmark
2
Aarhus Idrætspark, Aarhus, Denmark
4–6 May 1990
Carpet (indoors)

Finland
3

			1	2	3	4	5
1	(Denmark) (Finland)	Morten Christensen; Aki Rahunen	5; 7	6^{4} 7^{7}	3; 6
2	(Denmark) (Finland)	Michael Tauson; Veli Paloheimo	6; 1	7; 5	3; 6	4; 6	6; 3
3	(Denmark) (Finland)	Michael Mortensen / Michael Tauson; Veli Paloheimo / Olli Rahnasto	4; 6	4; 6	4; 6
4	(Denmark) (Finland)	Morten Christensen; Veli Paloheimo	6; 1	6; 4	3; 6	5; 7	4; 6
5	(Denmark) (Finland)	Michael Tauson; Aki Rahunen	6; 3	6; 2

== Relegation play-offs ==
=== Ghana vs. Ireland ===
Ghana
2
Accra Sports Stadium, Accra, Ghana
5–7 May 1990
Hard

Ireland
3

			1	2	3	4	5
1	(Ghana) (Republic of Ireland)	Kenneth Dowuona; Peter Wright	4; 6	7^{7} 6^{2}	3; 6	1; 6
2	(Ghana) (Republic of Ireland)	Franklyn Ofori; Eoin Collins	6^{6} 7^{8}	6^{4} 7^{7}	6; 3	3; 6
3	(Ghana) (Republic of Ireland)	Kenneth Dowuona / Franklyn Ofori; Eoin Collins / Peter Wright	6; 1	7; 5	2; 6	2; 6	9; 11
4	(Ghana) (Republic of Ireland)	Franklyn Ofori; Peter Wright	6; 2	6; 3
5	(Ghana) (Republic of Ireland)	Kenneth Dowuona; Michael Nugent	6; 4	6; 1
