= 1998 Davis Cup Europe/Africa Zone Group I =

International tennis competition

The Europe/Africa Zone was one of the three zones of the regional Davis Cup competition in 1998.

In the Europe/Africa Zone there were four different tiers, called groups, in which teams competed against each other to advance to the upper tier. Winners in Group I advanced to the World Group qualifying round, along with losing teams from the World Group first round. Teams who lost in the first round competed in the relegation play-offs, with winning teams remaining in Group I, whereas teams who lost their play-offs were relegated to the Europe/Africa Zone Group II in 1999.

== Participating nations ==
- Austria
- Croatia
- Denmark
- Finland
- France
- Great Britain
- Israel
- Norway
- Romania
- Ukraine

=== Draw ===
Second Round Play-offs
Oslo, Norway (clay)
Croatia	3
Norway	2
Pörtschach, Austria (clay)
Austria	5
Denmark	0

First Round Play-offs
Croatia
bye
bye
Norway
Austria
bye
Denmark
bye

First Round
France
bye
Helsinki, Finland (hard)
Croatia	2
Finland	3
Romania
bye
bye
Norway
Israel
bye
bye
Austria
Kyiv, Ukraine (indoor carpet)
Ukraine	3
Denmark	2
bye
Great Britain

Second Round
Helsinki, Finland (indoor carpet)
France	4
Finland	1
Bucharest, Romania (indoor hard)
Romania	4
Norway	1
Ramat HaSharon, Israel (hard)
Israel	4
Austria	1
Newcastle, England (indoor carpet)
Ukraine	0
Great Britain	5

- Norway and Denmark relegated to Group II in 1999.
- France, Romania, Israel, and Great Britain advance to World Group qualifying round.

== First round ==
=== Finland vs. Croatia ===
Finland
3
Tali Tennis Centre, Helsinki, Finland
13–15 February 1998
Hard

Croatia
2

			1	2	3	4	5
1	(Finland) (Croatia)	Ville Liukko; Ivan Ljubičić	4; 6	6; 4	7; 5	6; 4
2	(Finland) (Croatia)	Tuomas Ketola; Saša Hiršzon	4; 6	6; 3	0; 6	6^{5} 7^{7}
3	(Finland) (Croatia)	Tuomas Ketola / Ville Liukko; Saša Hiršzon / Ivan Ljubičić	6; 2	3; 6	4; 6	6; 3	6; 4
4	(Finland) (Croatia)	Tuomas Ketola; Ivan Ljubičić	6; 3	6; 3	6; 3
5	(Finland) (Croatia)	Ville Liukko; Željko Krajan	5; 7	6^{3} 7^{7}

=== Ukraine vs. Denmark ===
Ukraine
3
Nauka Tennis Centre, Kyiv, Ukraine
13–15 February 1998
Carpet (indoors)

Denmark
2

			1	2	3	4	5
1	(Ukraine) (Denmark)	Andriy Medvedev; Frederik Fetterlein	6; 3	6; 4	7; 5
2	(Ukraine) (Denmark)	Andrei Rybalko; Kenneth Carlsen	2; 6	6^{4} 7^{7}	3; 6
3	(Ukraine) (Denmark)	Andriy Medvedev / Dimitri Poliakov; Kenneth Carlsen / Frederik Fetterlein	6; 3	3; 6	6^{4} 7^{7}	7^{8} 6^{6}	6; 4
4	(Ukraine) (Denmark)	Andriy Medvedev; Kenneth Carlsen	6; 3	6; 3	6; 3
5	(Ukraine) (Denmark)	Denis Yakimenko; Frederik Fetterlein	2; 6	2; 6

== Second round ==
=== Finland vs. France ===
Finland
1
Tali Tennis Centre, Helsinki, Finland
3–5 April 1998
Carpet (indoors)

France
4

			1	2	3	4	5
1	(Finland) (France)	Tuomas Ketola; Guillaume Raoux	1; 6	1; 6	1; 6
2	(Finland) (France)	Ville Liukko; Cédric Pioline	3; 6	5; 7	5; 7
3	(Finland) (France)	Tuomas Ketola / Tommi Lenho; Nicolas Escudé / Guillaume Raoux	5; 7	6; 4	6^{1} 7^{7}	2; 6
4	(Finland) (France)	Tapio Nurminen; Jérôme Golmard	6^{4} 7^{7}	4; 6
5	(Finland) (France)	Tommi Lenho; Guillaume Raoux	6; 3	6; 4

=== Romania vs. Norway ===
Romania
4
Palatul Sport Culturii, Bucharest, Romania
3–5 April 1998
Hard (indoors)

Norway
1

			1	2	3	4	5
1	(Romania) (Norway)	Dinu Pescariu; Jan Frode Andersen	7^{7} 6^{2}	6; 4	6; 4
2	(Romania) (Norway)	Andrei Pavel; Christian Ruud	6; 2	6; 2	6; 2
3	(Romania) (Norway)	Andrei Pavel / Gabriel Trifu; Lars Hjarrand / Helge Koll-Frafjord	6; 3	6; 2	6; 2
4	(Romania) (Norway)	Dinu Pescariu; Christian Ruud	4; 6	6; 4	4; 6
5	(Romania) (Norway)	Andrei Pavel; Jan Frode Andersen	6; 4	6; 4

=== Israel vs. Austria ===
Israel
4
Canada Stadium, Ramat HaSharon, Israel
3–5 April 1998
Hard

Austria
1

			1	2	3	4	5
1	(Israel) (Austria)	Eyal Erlich; Gerald Mandl	6; 1	7^{7} 6^{4}	7; 5
2	(Israel) (Austria)	Amir Hadad; Stefan Koubek	7^{7} 6^{5}	6; 4	6; 3
3	(Israel) (Austria)	Noam Behr / Eyal Erlich; Thomas Buchmayer / Wolfgang Schranz	6; 4	7^{7} 6^{3}	4; 6	1; 6	6; 4
4	(Israel) (Austria)	Noam Behr; Stefan Koubek	7^{7} 6^{3}	6; 1
5	(Israel) (Austria)	Amir Hadad; Wolfgang Schranz	4; 6	7; 5	3; 6

=== Great Britain vs. Ukraine ===
Great Britain
5
Telewest Arena, Newcastle, England
3–5 April 1998
Carpet (indoors)

Ukraine
0

			1	2	3	4	5
1	(United Kingdom) (Ukraine)	Greg Rusedski; Andrei Rybalko	6; 4	6; 0	6; 4
2	(United Kingdom) (Ukraine)	Tim Henman; Andriy Medvedev	6; 2	6^{4} 7^{7}	6; 4	1; 6	6; 1
3	(United Kingdom) (Ukraine)	Tim Henman / Greg Rusedski; Andriy Medvedev / Andrei Rybalko	6; 4	7; 5	7^{11} 6^{9}
4	(United Kingdom) (Ukraine)	Greg Rusedski; Andriy Medvedev	6; 1	6; 4
5	(United Kingdom) (Ukraine)	Tim Henman; Andrei Rybalko	6; 1	2; 6	6; 2

== Second round relegation play-offs ==
=== Norway vs. Croatia ===
Norway
2
Oslo Tennis Club, Oslo, Norway
25–27 September 1998
Clay

Croatia
3

			1	2	3	4	5
1	(Norway) (Croatia)	Christian Ruud; Lovro Zovko	7^{7} 6^{5}	6; 4	6; 1
2	(Norway) (Croatia)	Jan Frode Andersen; Ivan Ljubičić	4; 6	4; 6	7^{7} 6^{5}	4; 6
3	(Norway) (Croatia)	Jan Frode Andersen / Christian Ruud; Ivan Ljubičić / Lovro Zovko	4; 6	6; 3	2; 6	6; 3	6; 8
4	(Norway) (Croatia)	Christian Ruud; Ivan Ljubičić	1; 6	1; 6	3; 6
5	(Norway) (Croatia)	Jan Frode Andersen; Lovro Zovko	6; 2	6; 3

=== Austria vs. Denmark ===
Austria
5
Werzer Arena, Pörtschach, Austria
25–27 September 1998
Clay

Denmark
0

			1	2	3	4	5
1	(Austria) (Denmark)	Markus Hipfl; Kenneth Carlsen	6; 4	6; 0	6; 3
2	(Austria) (Denmark)	Stefan Koubek; Thomas Larsen	3; 6	3; 6	6; 4	6; 0	6; 2
3	(Austria) (Denmark)	Wolfgang Schranz / Thomas Strengberger; Kenneth Carlsen / Frederik Fetterlein	6; 3	6; 2	6; 4
4	(Austria) (Denmark)	Wolfgang Schranz; Frederik Fetterlein	6; 3	6^{3} 7^{7}	6; 1
5	(Austria) (Denmark)	Markus Hipfl; Thomas Larsen	6; 1	6; 3
