= 1996 Davis Cup Europe/Africa Zone Group I =

International tennis competition

The Europe/Africa Zone was one of the three zones of the regional Davis Cup competition in 1996.

In the Europe/Africa Zone there were three different tiers, called groups, in which teams competed against each other to advance to the upper tier. Winners in Group I advanced to the World Group qualifying round, along with losing teams from the World Group first round. Teams who lost in the first round competed in the relegation play-offs, with winning teams remaining in Group I, whereas teams who lost their play-offs were relegated to the Europe/Africa Zone Group II in 1997.

== Participating nations ==
- Croatia
- Finland
- Israel
- Morocco
- Norway
- Romania
- Spain
- Ukraine
- Zimbabwe

=== Draw ===
Second Round Play-offs
Harare, Zimbabwe (hard)
Zimbabwe | 4
Finland | 1
Kyiv, Ukraine (clay)
Ukraine | 4
Norway | 1

First Round Play-offs
bye
Zimbabwe
bye
Finland
Ukraine
bye
Norway
bye

First Round
Morocco
bye
bye
Zimbabwe
Romania
bye
bye
Finland
Ukraine
bye
bye
Croatia
Ramat HaSharon, Israel (hard)
Norway | 2
Israel | 3
bye
Spain

Second Round
Casablanca, Morocco (clay)
Morocco | 4
Zimbabwe | 1
Helsinki, Finland (indoor carpet)
Romania | 3
Finland | 2
Dubrovnik, Croatia (indoor carpet)
Ukraine | 0
Croatia | 5
Ramat HaSharon, Israel (hard)
Israel | 1
Spain | 4

- Finland and Norway relegated to Group II in 1997.
- Morocco, Romania, Croatia, and Spain advance to World Group qualifying round.

== First round ==
=== Israel vs. Norway ===
Israel
3
Canada Centre, Ramat HaSharon, Israel
9–12 February 1996
Hard

Norway
2

| | | | 1 | 2 | 3 | 4 | 5 |
|---|---|---|---|---|---|---|---|
| 1 | (Israel) (Norway) | Noam Behr; Christian Ruud | 6^{5} 7^{7} | 2; 6 | 2; 6 |
| 2 | (Israel) (Norway) | Eyal Ran; Helge Koll-Frafjord | 6; 1 | 6; 2 | 6; 4 |
| 3 | (Israel) (Norway) | Eyal Erlich / Eyal Ran; Helge Koll-Frafjord / Christian Ruud | 3; 6 | 6^{5} 7^{7} | 7; 5 | 6; 3 | 6; 4 |
| 4 | (Israel) (Norway) | Eyal Ran; Christian Ruud | 5; 7 | 7^{7} 6^{5} | 7^{7} 6^{4} | 3; 6 | 1; 6 |
| 5 | (Israel) (Norway) | Eyal Erlich; Helge Koll-Frafjord | 6; 4 | 1; 6 | 6; 4 | 7^{7} 6^{4} |

== Second round ==
=== Morocco vs. Zimbabwe ===
Morocco
4
Complexe Al Amal, Casablanca, Morocco
5–7 April 1996
Clay

Zimbabwe
1

| | | | 1 | 2 | 3 | 4 | 5 |
|---|---|---|---|---|---|---|---|
| 1 | (Morocco) (Zimbabwe) | Karim Alami; Wayne Black | 5; 7 | 6; 3 | 5; 7 | 6; 1 | 2; 6 |
| 2 | (Morocco) (Zimbabwe) | Hicham Arazi; Byron Black | 6; 3 | 6; 2 | 6; 1 |
| 3 | (Morocco) (Zimbabwe) | Karim Alami / Hicham Arazi; Byron Black / Wayne Black | 6; 1 | 3; 6 | 7^{7} 6^{5} | 6^{4} 7^{7} | 6; 3 |
| 4 | (Morocco) (Zimbabwe) | Karim Alami; Malcolm Birch | 6; 3 | 6; 0 | 6; 1 |
| 5 | (Morocco) (Zimbabwe) | Hicham Arazi; Wayne Black | 6; 3 | 7^{7} 6^{5} |

=== Finland vs. Romania ===
Finland
2
Talin Tenniskeskus, Helsinki, Finland
5–7 April 1996
Carpet (indoors)

Romania
3

| | | | 1 | 2 | 3 | 4 | 5 |
|---|---|---|---|---|---|---|---|
| 1 | (Finland) (Romania) | Tuomas Ketola; Andrei Pavel | 4; 6 | 2; 6 | 4; 6 |
| 2 | (Finland) (Romania) | Kim Tiilikainen; Adrian Voinea | 1; 6 | 2; 6 | 4; 6 |
| 3 | (Finland) (Romania) | Tuomas Ketola / Ville Liukko; George Cosac / Dinu Pescariu | 2; 6 | 4; 6 | 6^{3} 7^{7} |
| 4 | (Finland) (Romania) | Tuomas Ketola; George Cosac | 6; 3 | 7^{7} 6^{1} |
| 5 | (Finland) (Romania) | Ville Liukko; Andrei Pavel | 6; 3 | 6; 3 |

=== Croatia vs. Ukraine ===
Croatia
5
Športska dvorana, Dubrovnik, Croatia
5–7 April 1996
Carpet (indoors)

Ukraine
0

| | | | 1 | 2 | 3 | 4 | 5 |
|---|---|---|---|---|---|---|---|
| 1 | (Croatia) (Ukraine) | Goran Ivanišević; Andrei Rybalko | 6; 0 | 7^{7} 6^{5} | 6^{4} 7^{7} | 6; 3 |
| 2 | (Croatia) (Ukraine) | Saša Hiršzon; Dimitri Poliakov | 6; 2 | 6; 0 | 6; 3 |
| 3 | (Croatia) (Ukraine) | Saša Hiršzon / Goran Ivanišević; Dimitri Poliakov / Andrei Rybalko | 7^{7} 6^{2} | 6; 3 | 6; 2 |
| 4 | (Croatia) (Ukraine) | Igor Šarić; Victor Trotsko | 6; 3 | 6; 4 |
| 5 | (Croatia) (Ukraine) | Goran Orešić; Sergei Yaroshenko | 6; 1 | 7^{12} 6^{10} |

=== Israel vs. Spain ===
Israel
1
Canada Centre, Ramat HaSharon, Israel
5–7 April 1996
Hard

Spain
4

| | | | 1 | 2 | 3 | 4 | 5 |
|---|---|---|---|---|---|---|---|---|
| 1 | (Israel) (Spain) | Eyal Ran; Carlos Costa | 6; 3 | 3; 6 | 4; 6 | 0; 2 | | retired |
| 2 | (Israel) (Spain) | Eyal Erlich; Albert Costa | 2; 6 | 6; 3 | 2; 6 | 2; 6 |
| 3 | (Israel) (Spain) | Noam Behr / Eyal Erlich; Àlex Corretja / Emilio Sánchez | 7; 5 | 4; 6 | 4; 6 | 7^{7} 6^{1} | 6; 3 |
| 4 | (Israel) (Spain) | Noam Behr; Albert Costa | 4; 6 | 4; 6 | 2; 6 |
| 5 | (Israel) (Spain) | Eyal Erlich; Carlos Costa | 6^{1} 7^{7} | 1; 6 |

== Second round relegation play-offs ==
=== Zimbabwe vs. Finland ===
Zimbabwe
4
City Sports Centre, Harare, Zimbabwe
20–22 September 1996
Hard

Finland
1

| | | | 1 | 2 | 3 | 4 | 5 |
|---|---|---|---|---|---|---|---|
| 1 | (Zimbabwe) (Finland) | Wayne Black; Kim Tiilikainen | 6; 4 | 7; 5 | 6^{3} 7^{7} | 6; 3 |
| 2 | (Zimbabwe) (Finland) | Byron Black; Ville Liukko | 6; 3 | 6; 3 | 6; 4 |
| 3 | (Zimbabwe) (Finland) | Byron Black / Wayne Black; Ville Liukko / Kim Tiilikainen | 6; 1 | 6; 1 | 6; 3 |
| 4 | (Zimbabwe) (Finland) | Byron Black; Tapio Nurminen | 6^{7} 7^{9} | 6; 4 | 6; 3 |
| 5 | (Zimbabwe) (Finland) | Genius Chidzikwe; Ville Liukko | 1; 6 | 6^{1} 7^{7} |

=== Ukraine vs. Norway ===
Ukraine
4
Nauka Sports Club, Kyiv, Ukraine
20–22 September 1996
Clay

Norway
1

| | | | 1 | 2 | 3 | 4 | 5 |
|---|---|---|---|---|---|---|---|
| 1 | (Ukraine) (Norway) | Andriy Medvedev; Jan Frode Andersen | 6; 2 | 6; 2 | 6; 0 |
| 2 | (Ukraine) (Norway) | Andrei Rybalko; Christian Ruud | 7^{9} 6^{7} | 6; 4 | 6; 4 |
| 3 | (Ukraine) (Norway) | Andriy Medvedev / Dimitri Poliakov; Helge Koll-Frafjord / Christian Ruud | 6; 0 | 0; 6 | 6; 0 | 6; 1 |
| 4 | (Ukraine) (Norway) | Andriy Medvedev; Christian Ruud | 6; 2 | 6; 1 |
| 5 | (Ukraine) (Norway) | Denis Yakimenko; Jan Frode Andersen | 6^{2} 7^{7} | 4; 6 |
