= 1989 Davis Cup Europe/Africa Zone =

International tennis competition

The Europe/Africa Zone is one of the three zones of the regional Davis Cup competition in 1989.

In the Europe/Africa Zone there are two different tiers, called groups, in which teams compete against each other to advance to the upper tier.

== Group I ==
Winners in Group I advanced to the World Group qualifying round, along with losing teams from the World Group first round. Teams who lost in the first round competed in the relegation play-offs, with winning teams remaining in Group I, whereas teams who lost their play-offs were relegated to the Europe/Africa Zone Group IIs in 1990.

=== Participating nations ===
- Finland
- Great Britain
- Hungary
- Ireland
- Netherlands
- Nigeria
- Portugal
- Romania
- Senegal
- Switzerland
- Zimbabwe

=== Draw ===
First Round
Switzerland
bye
bye
Romania
Harare, Zimbabwe (indoor hard)
Zimbabwe	1
Hungary	4
bye
Nigeria
Great Britain
bye
Dublin, Ireland (indoor hard)
Ireland	0
Finland	5
Porto, Portugal (indoor clay)
Senegal	0
Portugal	5
bye
Netherlands

Second Round
Liestal, Switzerland (clay)
Switzerland	4
Romania	1
Budapest, Hungary (clay)
Hungary	4
Nigeria	1
Helsinki, Finland (indoor carpet)
Great Britain	4
Finland	1
Best, Netherlands (indoor carpet)
Portugal	1
Netherlands	4

- Switzerland, Hungary, Great Britain and Netherlands advance to World Group qualifying round.

Relegation Play-off
Limerick, Ireland (carpet)
Ireland	4
Senegal	1

- Zimbabwe and Senegal relegated to Group II in 1990.

== Group II Europe ==
The winner in the Europe Zone Group II advanced to the Europe/Africa Zone Group I in 1990.

=== Participating nations ===
- Belgium
- Bulgaria
- Cyprus
- Greece
- Luxembourg
- Malta
- Monaco
- Norway
- Poland
- Turkey

=== Draw ===
First round 7–9 April
Belgium
bye
bye
Turkey
Norway
bye
Luxembourg City, Luxembourg (indoor hard)
Luxembourg	5
Malta	0
Poland
bye
bye
Greece
Monte Carlo, Monaco (clay)
Cyprus	0
Monaco	5
bye
Bulgaria

Second Round
Liège, Belgium (clay)
Belgium	5
Turkey	0
Luxembourg City, Luxembourg (indoor hard)
Norway	2
Luxembourg	3
Warsaw, Poland (clay)
Poland	2
Greece	3
Monte Carlo, Monaco (clay)
Monaco	3
Bulgaria	1

Third Round
Luxembourg City, Luxembourg (indoor hard)
Belgium	5
Luxembourg	0
Athens, Greece (clay)
Greece	3
Monaco	2

Fourth Round
Athens, Greece (clay)
Belgium	5
Greece	0

- Belgium promoted to Group I in 1990.

== Group II Africa ==
The winner in the Africa Zone Group II advanced to the Europe/Africa Zone Group I in 1990.

=== Participating nations ===
- Algeria
- Cameroon
- Egypt
- Ghana
- Ivory Coast
- Kenya
- Libya
- Morocco
- Tunisia

=== Draw ===
First round 3–5 February
Egypt
bye
bye
Ghana
Cameroon
bye
bye
Libya
Tunis, Tunisia (hard)
Algeria	5
Tunisia	0
bye
Morocco
Kenya
bye
bye
Ivory Coast

Second Round
Accra, Ghana (hard)
Egypt	1
Ghana	4
Tripoli, Libya (hard)
Cameroon	5
Libya	0
Algiers, Algeria (clay)
Algeria	1
Morocco	3
Nairobi, Kenya (clay)
Kenya	3
Ivory Coast	2

Third Round
Accra, Ghana (hard)
Ghana	4
Cameroon	1
Nairobi, Kenya (clay)
Morocco	5
Kenya	0

Fourth Round
Accra, Ghana (hard)
Ghana	4
Morocco	1

- Ghana promoted to Group I in 1990.
