= 1993 Davis Cup Europe/Africa Zone Group I =

International tennis competition

The Europe/Africa Zone was one of the three zones of the regional Davis Cup competition in 1993.

In the Europe/Africa Zone there were three different tiers, called groups, in which teams competed against each other to advance to the upper tier. Winners in Group I advanced to the World Group qualifying round, along with losing teams from the World Group first round. Teams who lost in the first round competed in the relegation play-offs, with winning teams remaining in Group I, whereas teams who lost their play-offs were relegated to the Europe/Africa Zone Group II in 1994.

== Participating nations ==
- Belgium
- Croatia (Note: As the stronger tennis nation that began Davis Cup play immediately after the breakup of Yugoslavia, and due to the ongoing sanctions against the Federal Republic of Yugoslavia, Croatia took Yugoslavia's spot in Group I and Slovenia began as a new nation in Group III. Yugoslavia continued to hold their historical records when they resumed play in 1995, which were subsequently passed onto Serbia.)
- Finland
- Great Britain
- Hungary
- Israel
- Kenya
- Luxembourg
- Norway
- Portugal
- Zimbabwe

=== Draw ===
First Round
Israel
bye
bye
Portugal
Esch-sur-Alzette, Luxembourg (indoor carpet)
Kenya	1
Luxembourg	4
bye
Belgium
Great Britain
bye
Budapest, Hungary (indoor carpet)
Finland	1
Hungary	4
Oslo, Norway (indoor carpet)
Norway	1
Zimbabwe	4
bye
Croatia

Second Round
Lisbon, Portugal (clay)
Israel	3
Portugal	2
Waregem, Belgium (clay)
Luxembourg	0
Belgium	5
Budapest, Hungary (clay)
Great Britain	2
Hungary	3
Harare, Zimbabwe (indoor hard)
Zimbabwe	2
Croatia	3

- Israel, Belgium, Hungary and Croatia advance to World Group qualifying round.

Relegation Play-off
Helsinki, Finland (indoor carpet)
Finland	2
Norway	3

- Kenya and Finland relegated to Group II in 1994.

== First round ==
=== Luxembourg vs. Kenya ===
Luxembourg
4
National Tennis Centre, Esch-sur-Alzette, Luxembourg
26–28 March 1993
Carpet (indoors)

Kenya
1

			1	2	3	4	5
1	(Luxembourg) (Kenya)	Johny Goudenbour; Eno Polo	6; 4	6; 3	7^{8} 6^{6}
2	(Luxembourg) (Kenya)	Serge Brueck; Paul Wekesa	4; 6	5; 7	6; 3	6; 2	3; 6
3	(Luxembourg) (Kenya)	Johny Goudenbour / Alberto Paris; Eno Polo / Paul Wekesa	7^{7} 6^{5}	7^{7} 6^{4}	7; 5
4	(Luxembourg) (Kenya)	Johny Goudenbour; Paul Wekesa	7; 5	7; 5	6; 2
5	(Luxembourg) (Kenya)	Serge Brueck; Eno Polo	7^{7} 6^{4}	6; 1

=== Hungary vs. Finland ===
Hungary
4
Vasas Sport Clubja, Budapest, Hungary
26–28 March 1993
Carpet (indoors)

Finland
1

			1	2	3	4	5
1	(Hungary) (Finland)	Sándor Noszály; Tuomas Ketola	6; 4	6; 1	6; 4
2	(Hungary) (Finland)	József Krocskó; Olli Rahnasto	6; 1	4; 6	5; 7	3; 6
3	(Hungary) (Finland)	András Lányi / László Markovits; Alexander Lindholm / Olli Rahnasto	6; 4	6; 3	7^{7} 6^{5}
4	(Hungary) (Finland)	Sándor Noszály; Olli Rahnasto	7^{7} 6^{3}	6; 1	7^{8} 6^{6}
5	(Hungary) (Finland)	József Krocskó; Tuomas Ketola	6; 3	6; 2

=== Norway vs. Zimbabwe ===
Norway
1
National Tennis Centre, Oslo, Norway
26–28 March 1993
Carpet (indoors)

Zimbabwe
4

			1	2	3	4	5
1	(Norway) (Zimbabwe)	Bent-Ove Pedersen; Byron Black	6^{1} 7^{7}	0; 6	6; 4	6; 3	6; 4
2	(Norway) (Zimbabwe)	Christian Ruud; Wayne Black	6; 2	5; 7	6; 3	3; 6	2; 6
3	(Norway) (Zimbabwe)	Bent-Ove Pedersen / Christian Ruud; Byron Black / Wayne Black	6; 3	2; 6	3; 6	6^{3} 7^{7}
4	(Norway) (Zimbabwe)	Anders Håseth; Byron Black	2; 6	3; 6	7^{8} 6^{6}	3; 6
5	(Norway) (Zimbabwe)	Bent-Ove Pedersen; Wayne Black	2; 6	2; 6

== Second round ==
=== Portugal vs. Israel ===
Portugal
2
Club Internacional de Foot-ball, Lisbon, Portugal
30 April–2 May 1993
Clay

Israel
3

			1	2	3	4	5
1	(Portugal) (Israel)	Nuno Marques; Amos Mansdorf	4; 6	6; 2	5; 7	1; 6
2	(Portugal) (Israel)	João Cunha e Silva; Gilad Bloom	6; 3	6^{3} 7^{7}	4; 6	1; 6
3	(Portugal) (Israel)	João Cunha e Silva / Nuno Marques; Gilad Bloom / Amos Mansdorf	6; 3	3; 6	4; 6	6; 3	6; 4
4	(Portugal) (Israel)	João Cunha e Silva; Amos Mansdorf	6^{6} 7^{8}	4; 6	5; 7
5	(Portugal) (Israel)	Nuno Marques; Gilad Bloom	7; 5	7; 5

=== Belgium vs. Luxembourg ===
Belgium
5
European S&B Centre, Waregem, Belgium
30 April–2 May 1993
Clay

Luxembourg
0

			1	2	3	4	5
1	(Belgium) (Luxembourg)	Filip Dewulf; Johny Goudenbour	6; 4	6; 1	6; 1
2	(Belgium) (Luxembourg)	Bart Wuyts; Alberto Paris	6; 2	2; 6	6; 1	6; 2
3	(Belgium) (Luxembourg)	Filip Dewulf / Tom Vanhoudt; Johny Goudenbour / Alberto Paris	6; 2	6; 4	7; 5
4	(Belgium) (Luxembourg)	Bart Wuyts; Johny Goudenbour	6; 4	6; 4
5	(Belgium) (Luxembourg)	Filip Dewulf; Alberto Paris	7; 5	6; 3

=== Hungary vs. Great Britain ===
Hungary
3
Újpesti Torna Egylet, Budapest, Hungary
30 April–2 May 1993
Clay

Great Britain
2

			1	2	3	4	5
1	(Hungary) (United Kingdom)	József Krocskó; Chris Wilkinson	6; 4	6; 2	7; 5
2	(Hungary) (United Kingdom)	Sándor Noszály; Jeremy Bates	6; 2	4; 6	6; 3	3; 6	6; 1
3	(Hungary) (United Kingdom)	András Lányi / László Markovits; Jeremy Bates / Mark Petchey	3; 6	2; 6	4; 6
4	(Hungary) (United Kingdom)	József Krocskó; Jeremy Bates	4; 6	5; 7	6; 3	6^{4} 7^{7}
5	(Hungary) (United Kingdom)	Sándor Noszály; Chris Wilkinson	7; 5	6; 4	7; 5

=== Zimbabwe vs. Croatia ===
Zimbabwe
2
City Sports Centre, Harare, Zimbabwe
30 April–2 May 1993
Hard (indoors)

Croatia
3

			1	2	3	4	5
1	(Zimbabwe) (Croatia)	Wayne Black; Goran Ivanišević	4; 6	2; 6	2; 6
2	(Zimbabwe) (Croatia)	Byron Black; Goran Prpić	6; 4	7^{7} 6^{3}	6; 4
3	(Zimbabwe) (Croatia)	Byron Black / Wayne Black; Goran Ivanišević / Goran Prpić	7^{7} 6^{4}	7^{7} 6^{5}	7^{7} 6^{3}
4	(Zimbabwe) (Croatia)	Byron Black; Goran Ivanišević	4; 6	2; 6	2; 6
5	(Zimbabwe) (Croatia)	Wayne Black; Goran Prpić	4; 6	3; 6	0; 6

== Relegation play-off ==
=== Finland vs. Norway ===
Finland
2
Talin Tenniskeskus, Helsinki, Finland
30 April–2 May 1993
Carpet (indoors)

Norway
3

			1	2	3	4	5
1	(Finland) (Norway)	Olli Rahnasto; Helge Koll-Frafjord	4; 6	6; 4	4; 6	6; 2	6; 1
2	(Finland) (Norway)	Tuomas Ketola; Anders Håseth	6; 2	6; 3	3; 6	2; 6	4; 6
3	(Finland) (Norway)	Olli Rahnasto / Pasi Virtanen; Bent-Ove Pedersen / Christian Ruud	6; 3	4; 6	3; 6	7^{7} 6^{5}	8; 10
4	(Finland) (Norway)	Olli Rahnasto; Anders Håseth	6; 2	6; 1	7^{7} 6^{1}
5	(Finland) (Norway)	Tuomas Ketola; Christian Ruud	6^{4} 7^{7}	2; 6	0; 6
