= 2010 Davis Cup Europe/Africa Zone Group I =

International tennis competition

The European and African Zone is one of the three zones of regional Davis Cup competition in 2010.

In the European and African Zone there are four different groups in which teams compete against each other to advance to the next group.

== Participating teams ==
=== Seeds ===
1. Austria
2. Romania
3. Netherlands
4. South Africa

=== Other Nations ===
- Belarus
- Finland
- Italy
- Latvia
- Poland
- Slovakia
- Ukraine

== Draw ==
Second-round play-offs
Minsk, Belarus (hard)
Slovakia	4
Belarus	1
Riga, Latvia (indoor carpet)
Poland	3
Latvia	2

First-round play-offs
bye
Slovakia
3	Netherlands	4
Belarus	1
Poland
bye
Latvia
bye

First Round
1	Austria
bye
Slovakia
bye
3	Netherlands
bye
Castellaneta, Italy (clay)
Italy	5
Belarus	0
Sopot, Poland (indoor hard)
Poland	2
Finland	3
bye
4	South Africa
Dnipropetrovsk, Ukraine (indoor hard)
Ukraine	4
Latvia	1
bye
2	Romania

Second Round
Bad Gleichenberg, Austria (indoor hard)
1	Austria	3
Slovakia	2
Zoetermeer, Netherlands (indoor hard)
3	Netherlands	1
Italy	4
Pretoria, South Africa (hard)
Finland	0
4	South Africa	4
Bucharest, Romania (clay)
Ukraine	1
2	Romania	3

- Belarus and Latvia relegated to Group II in 2011.
- Austria, Italy, South Africa, and Romania advance to 2010 Davis Cup World Group play-offs.

== First Round Matches ==
=== Italy vs. Belarus ===
Italy
5
Nova Yardinia, Castellaneta Marina, Italy
5–7 March 2010
clay (outdoor)

Belarus
0

			1	2	3	4	5
1	(Italy) (Belarus)	Potito Starace; Uladzimir Ignatik	6; 4	6; 1	6; 2
2	(Italy) (Belarus)	Fabio Fognini; Alexander Bury	6; 2	6; 4	6; 1
3	(Italy) (Belarus)	Simone Bolelli / Filippo Volandri; Uladzimir Ignatik / Max Mirnyi	6; 1	6; 4	6; 2
4	(Italy) (Belarus)	Simone Bolelli; Uladzimir Ignatik	6; 3	6; 3
5	(Italy) (Belarus)	Filippo Volandri; Andrei Vasilevski	7^{7} 6^{3}	6; 3

=== Poland vs. Finland ===
Poland
2
Hala 100-lecia Sopotu, Sopot, Poland
5–7 March 2010
hard (indoor)

Finland
3

			1	2	3	4	5
1	(Poland) (Finland)	Michał Przysiężny; Jarkko Nieminen	7^{7} 6^{5}	6^{4} 7^{7}	7^{7} 6^{5}	6^{7} 7^{9}	4; 6
2	(Poland) (Finland)	Łukasz Kubot; Henri Kontinen	6; 4	6; 2	7^{7} 6^{5}
3	(Poland) (Finland)	Mariusz Fyrstenberg / Marcin Matkowski; Henri Kontinen / Jarkko Nieminen	6; 4	7^{7} 6^{4}	4; 6	6; 3
4	(Poland) (Finland)	Łukasz Kubot; Jarkko Nieminen	4; 6	6^{6} 7^{8}	7^{7} 6^{4}	6; 2	5; 7
5	(Poland) (Finland)	Michał Przysiężny; Henri Kontinen	4; 6	6; 3	7^{7} 6^{4}	6^{4} 7^{7}	5; 7

=== Ukraine vs. Latvia ===
Ukraine
4
Megaron Tennis Club, Dnipropetrovsk, Ukraine
5–7 March 2010
hard (indoor)

Latvia
1

			1	2	3	4	5
1	(Ukraine) (Latvia)	Illya Marchenko; Andis Juška	6; 3	6; 2	6; 4
2	(Ukraine) (Latvia)	Sergiy Stakhovsky; Deniss Pavlovs	6; 2	6; 3	6; 4
3	(Ukraine) (Latvia)	Sergei Bubka / Sergiy Stakhovsky; Andis Juška / Deniss Pavlovs	6^{4} 7^{7}	3; 6	2; 6
4	(Ukraine) (Latvia)	Sergiy Stakhovsky; Andis Juška	6; 2	5; 7	6; 4	7^{7} 6^{2}
5	(Ukraine) (Latvia)	Ivan Sergeyev; Karlis Lejnieks	6; 4	6^{6} 7^{8}	6; 1

== Second Round Matches ==
=== Austria vs. Slovakia ===
Austria
3
Gleichenberg-Halle, Bad Gleichenberg, Austria
5–7 March 2010
hard (indoor)

Slovakia
2

			1	2	3	4	5
1	(Austria) (Slovakia)	Daniel Köllerer; Lukáš Lacko	6; 2	2; 6	6^{5} 7^{7}	3; 6
2	(Austria) (Slovakia)	Jürgen Melzer; Martin Kližan	6; 3	6; 3	7; 5
3	(Austria) (Slovakia)	Julian Knowle / Jürgen Melzer; Michal Mertiňák / Filip Polášek	3; 6	6; 1	6; 3	6; 2
4	(Austria) (Slovakia)	Jürgen Melzer; Lukáš Lacko	7^{7} 6^{2}	7; 5	7; 5
5	(Austria) (Slovakia)	Daniel Köllerer; Martin Kližan	2; 6	6^{3} 7^{7}

=== Netherlands vs. Italy ===
Netherlands
1
PWA Silverdome, Zoetermeer, Netherlands
7 – 9 May
Hard – Indoors

Italy
4

			1	2	3	4	5
1	(Netherlands) (Italy)	Thiemo de Bakker; Simone Bolelli	6^{5} 7^{7}	6^{5} 7^{7}	3; 6
2	(Netherlands) (Italy)	Robin Haase; Potito Starace	5; 7	3; 6	6; 2	6^{2} 7^{7}
3	(Netherlands) (Italy)	Robin Haase / Igor Sijsling; Simone Bolelli / Potito Starace	6; 4	3; 6	6^{5} 7^{7}	4; 6
4	(Netherlands) (Italy)	Igor Sijsling; Paolo Lorenzi	4; 6	3; 6
5	(Netherlands) (Italy)	Robin Haase; Daniele Bracciali	7^{9} 6^{7}	7; 5

=== Finland vs. South Africa ===
Finland
0
Groenkloof Tennis Stadium, Pretoria, South Africa
7 – 9 May
Hard, Outdoors

South Africa
4

			1	2	3	4	5
1	(Finland) (South Africa)	Harri Helliovaara; Izak van der Merwe	3; 6	4; 6	6; 3	3; 6
2	(Finland) (South Africa)	Jarkko Nieminen; Rik de Voest	7; 5	3; 6	2; 6	7; 5	3; 6
3	(Finland) (South Africa)	Harri Helliovaara / Jarkko Nieminen; Rik de Voest / Wesley Moodie	2; 6	3; 6	4; 6
4	(Finland) (South Africa)	Timo Nieminen; Izak van der Merwe	3; 6	4; 6
5	(Finland) (South Africa)	Harri Helliovaara; Rik de Voest						not played

=== Ukraine vs. Romania ===
Ukraine
1
Arenele BNR, București, Bucharest, Romania
7 – 9 May
Clay, Outdoors

Romania
3

			1	2	3	4	5
1	(Ukraine) (Romania)	Illya Marchenko; Victor Hănescu	6^{1} 7^{7}	5; 7	4; 6
2	(Ukraine) (Romania)	Sergiy Stakhovsky; Adrian Ungur	6; 2	6^{3} 7^{7}	7; 5	7; 5
3	(Ukraine) (Romania)	Sergei Bubka / Sergiy Stakhovsky; Victor Hănescu / Horia Tecău	4; 6	4; 6	2; 6
4	(Ukraine) (Romania)	Sergiy Stakhovsky; Victor Hănescu	4; 6	2; 6	5; 7
5	(Ukraine) (Romania)	Ivan Sergeyev; Marius Copil	6; 4	1; 2				not completed

== First-round play-offs ==
=== Netherlands vs. Belarus ===
Netherlands
4
Republic Olympic Training Centre for Tennis, Minsk, Belarus
9 – 11 July
Hard, Outdoors

Belarus
1

			1	2	3	4	5
1	(Netherlands) (Belarus)	Thiemo de Bakker; Andrei Vasilevski	6; 2	6; 2	7; 5
2	(Netherlands) (Belarus)	Robin Haase; Uladzimir Ignatik	4; 6	5; 7	6; 3	6; 0	6; 3
3	(Netherlands) (Belarus)	Igor Sijsling / Thiemo de Bakker; Max Mirnyi / Uladzimir Ignatik	7; 5	3; 6	6^{6} 7^{8}	6; 4	3; 6
4	(Netherlands) (Belarus)	Thiemo de Bakker; Uladzimir Ignatik	6; 1	7^{7} 6^{5}	6^{4} 7^{7}	6; 4
5	(Netherlands) (Belarus)	Robin Haase; Andrei Vasilevski	6; 3	6; 4

== Second-round play-offs ==
=== Slovakia vs. Belarus ===
Slovakia
4
Republic Olympic Training Center for Tennis, Minsk, Belarus
17 – 19 September
Hard

Belarus
1

			1	2	3	4	5
1	(Slovakia) (Belarus)	Martin Kližan; Uladzimir Ignatik	6^{9} 7^{11}	2; 6	2; 6
2	(Slovakia) (Belarus)	Lukáš Lacko; Siarhei Betau	6; 0	6; 4	6; 4
3	(Slovakia) (Belarus)	Michal Mertiňák / Filip Polášek; Uladzimir Ignatik / Max Mirnyi	7^{7} 6^{5}	7^{8} 6^{6}	3; 6	4; 6	6; 4
4	(Slovakia) (Belarus)	Lukáš Lacko; Uladzimir Ignatik	6; 1	3; 6	6; 1	6^{7} 7^{9}	6; 4
5	(Slovakia) (Belarus)	Martin Kližan; Siarhei Betau	7^{7} 6^{2}	6; 2

=== Poland vs. Latvia ===
Poland
3
Olympic Sports Centre, Riga, Latvia
17 – 19 September
Carpet

Latvia
2

			1	2	3	4	5
1	(Poland) (Latvia)	Michał Przysiężny; Andis Juška	6; 3	6; 4	6; 4
2	(Poland) (Latvia)	Jerzy Janowicz; Ernests Gulbis	4; 6	4; 6	6; 3	2; 6
3	(Poland) (Latvia)	Mariusz Fyrstenberg / Marcin Matkowski; Andis Juška / Deniss Pavlovs	6; 3	6; 4	7^{7} 6^{4}
4	(Poland) (Latvia)	Michał Przysiężny; Ernests Gulbis	7^{7} 6^{5}	1; 6	2; 6	5; 7
5	(Poland) (Latvia)	Jerzy Janowicz; Kārlis Lejnieks	7; 5	6; 4	7^{7} 6^{3}
