= 1988 Davis Cup Europe/Africa Zone =

International tennis competition

The Europe/Africa Zone is one of the three zones of the regional Davis Cup competition in 1988.

In the Europe/Africa Zone there are two different tiers, called groups, in which teams compete against each other to advance to the upper tier.

== Group I ==
Winners in Group I were promoted to the following year's World Group. Teams who lost in the first round competed in the relegation play-offs, with winning teams remaining in Group I, whereas teams who lost their play-offs were relegated to the Europe/Africa Zone Group IIs in 1989.

=== Participating nations ===
- Austria
- Belgium
- Bulgaria
- Finland
- Great Britain
- Hungary
- Netherlands
- Nigeria
- Portugal
- Romania
- Senegal
- Soviet Union

=== Draw ===
First Round; 6–8 May
Great Britain
bye
Brussels, Belgium (clay)
Finland | 4
Belgium | 1
Lagos, Nigeria (hard)
Hungary | 0
Nigeria | 5
bye
Austria
Netherlands
bye
Dakar, Senegal (hard)
Senegal | 4
Bulgaria | 1
Timișoara, Romania (clay)
Romania | 2
Portugal | 3
bye
Soviet Union

Second Round; 9–12 June
Bristol, United Kingdom (grass)
Great Britain | 3
Finland | 1
Villach, Austria (clay)
Nigeria | 0
Austria | 5
Warmond, Netherlands (clay)
Netherlands | 3
Senegal | 2
Lisbon, Portugal (clay)
Portugal | 0
Soviet Union | 5

Third Round; 22–24 July
Zell am See, Austria (clay)
Great Britain | 0
Austria | 5
Jūrmala, Soviet Union (clay)
Netherlands | 0
Soviet Union | 5

- Austria and Soviet Union are promoted to the World Group in 1989.

Relegation Play-offs; 10–13 June
Budapest, Hungary (clay)
Belgium | 2
Hungary | 3
Sofia, Bulgaria (clay)
Bulgaria | 0
Romania | 5

- Belgium and Bulgaria are relegated to Group II in 1989.

== Group II Europe ==
The winner in the Europe Zone Group II advanced to the Europe/Africa Zone Group I in 1989.

=== Participating nations ===
- Cyprus
- Greece
- Ireland
- Luxembourg
- Malta
- Monaco
- Norway
- Poland
- Turkey

=== Draw ===
First round 8–10 April
Poland
bye
bye
Luxembourg
Greece
bye
bye
Turkey
Stavanger, Norway (indoor hard)
Malta | 0
Norway | 5
bye
Monaco
Cyprus
bye
bye
Ireland

Second Round; 6–8 May
Warsaw, Poland (clay)
Poland | 5
Luxembourg | 0
Athens, Greece (clay)
Greece | 4
Turkey | 1
Bergen, Norway (indoor carpet)
Norway | 4
Monaco | 1
Cork, Ireland (indoor carpet)
Cyprus | 0
Ireland | 5

Third Round; 10–12 June
Athens, Greece (clay)
Poland | 1
Greece | 3
Belfast, Northern Ireland (grass)
Norway | 2
Ireland | 3

Third Round; 22–24 July
Dublin, Ireland (grass)
Greece | 0
Ireland | 5

- Ireland are promoted to Group I in 1989.

== Group II Africa ==
The winner in the Africa Zone Group II advanced to the Europe/Africa Zone Group I in 1989.

=== Participating nations ===
- Algeria
- Cameroon
- Egypt
- Ghana
- Ivory Coast
- Kenya
- Morocco
- Tunisia
- Zimbabwe

=== Draw ===
First round 5–7 February
Zimbabwe
bye
bye
Cameroon
Algeria
bye
bye
Ivory Coast
Tunisia
bye
bye
Morocco
Accra, Ghana (indoor carpet)
Ghana | 1
Kenya | 4
bye
Egypt

Second Round; 8–10 April
Harare, Zimbabwe (indoor hard)
Zimbabwe | 5
Cameroon | 0
Abidjan, Ivory Coast (hard)
Algeria | 2
Ivory Coast | 3
Tunis, Tunisia (hard)
Tunisia | 0
Morocco | 5
Cairo, Egypt (clay)
Kenya | 0
Egypt | 5

Third Round; 6–8 May
Abidjan, Ivory Coast (hard)
Zimbabwe | 3
Ivory Coast | 2
Casablanca, Morocco (clay)
Morocco | 2
Egypt | 3

Third Round; 22–24 July
Harare, Zimbabwe (indoor hard)
Zimbabwe | 5
Egypt | 0

- Zimbabwe are promoted to Group I in 1989.
