= Christian Camradt =

Danish tennis player

- Country (sports): Denmark
- Born: 26 July 1969 (age 55)
- Plays: Left-handed

Singles
- Career record: 0–1
- Highest ranking: No. 755 (1 Oct 1990)

Doubles
- Highest ranking: No. 889 (10 Sep 1990)

Christian Camradt (born 26 July 1969) is a Danish former professional tennis player.

A left-handed player, Camradt won two national indoor singles championships and represented the Denmark Davis Cup team in a 1992 tie against Kenya. He had a career best ATP singles world ranking of 755 and made his only ATP Tour main draw appearance at the 1993 Copenhagen Open.

Camradt is the former head coach of the Lyngby Tennis Club and in this capacity coached Caroline Wozniacki. He also accompanied Wozniacki in some overseas tournaments.

== See also ==
- List of Denmark Davis Cup team representatives
