= Sadiq Abdullahi =

Nigerian tennis player (born 1960)

- Born: 5 February 1960 (age 66); Nigeria
- Citizenship: Nigeria
- Occupations: Lecturer, Tennis player
- Notable work: Lecturer at Florida International University and Miami Dade College

Dr. Sadiq Abubakar Abdullahi (born 5 February 1960) is a Nigerian former professional tennis player, academic, and sports development advocate. He is the co-founder and Executive Director of Tennis Vision 2035, an organisation supporting young student athletes in Nigeria.

== Early life ==
Abdullahi was born on 5 February 1960 in Nigeria. He began his connection with tennis as a ball boy at Lagos Country Club in 1967, serving established players including Captain Yemisi Allan, Awopegba, and Kehinde Ajayi until 1975. In 1976, he performed the same role when American tennis legend Arthur Ashe visited Nigeria.

== Tennis career ==
Abdullahi became a professional tennis player and was part of Nigeria's golden era of tennis in the 1980s alongside Nduka Odizor, Tony Mmoh, and David Imonitie, collectively known as the "Four Musketeers of Nigerian Tennis." He won the Nigerian National Championships on three consecutive occasions from 1986 to 1988 and was ranked number one in the national rankings from 1982 to 1989.

In 1987, Abdullahi defeated Tony Mmoh, the Nigerian number-two seed, at the Kenya Open ATP Challenger. The following year he reached the semi-finals of the Okada Challenger tournament in Kenya, losing to fellow countryman Nduka Odizor. He reached his career-high ATP singles ranking of 262nd in the world on 14 October 1985.

At the 1988 Summer Olympics in Seoul, Abdullahi represented Nigeria in the singles tournament, losing to Spain's [[Javier Sánchez]] in the opening round. He retired from professional tennis in 1989 after the US Open at Flushing Meadows, New York.

== Coaching and academic career ==
After retiring, Abdullahi joined Peter Burwash International, an international tennis management firm, from 1989 to 1993. He was assigned to the Doral Resort and Country Club in Miami, Florida, where he served as Head of Coaching under Arthur Ashe, the resort's International Tennis Director, until Ashe's death in February 1993.

Between 1994 and 2004, Abdullahi pursued a doctoral degree in Curriculum and Instruction with specialisation in Social and Global Education at Florida International University, receiving his doctorate in 2004. He subsequently became an Adjunct Professor in the Department of Teaching and Learning at Florida International University and later a Visiting Professor at the Federal University of Kashere, Gombe State, Nigeria.

== Tennis development in Nigeria ==
Since 2009, Abdullahi has worked actively to develop tennis in Nigeria, travelling across the country to establish academies and build partnerships between clubs, government, and corporate sponsors. He is the co-founder and Executive Director of Tennis Vision 2035, an organisation dedicated to developing young student athletes in Nigeria through tennis. He is also a member of the 2020 National Sports Industry Drafting Committee and the Kaduna State Tennis Association.
