= Finland Davis Cup team =

Davis Cup team representing Finland

Finland
- Captain: Jarkko Nieminen
- Nations Ranking: 22 ▼7 (21 September 2026)
- Colors: Blue & white
- First year: 1928
- Years played: 81
- Ties played (W–L): 147 (62–85)
- Years in World Group: 4 (5–7)
- Best finish: Semi-finals (2023)
- Most total wins: Jarkko Nieminen (63–27)
- Most singles wins: Jarkko Nieminen (48–11)
- Most doubles wins: Henri Kontinen (16–6)
- Best doubles team: Henri Kontinen & Jarkko Nieminen (9–3)
- Most ties played: Jarkko Nieminen (35)
- Most years played: Jarkko Nieminen (18)
- Last updated on: 2 November 2026.

The Finland men's national tennis team represents Finland in Davis Cup tennis competition and are governed by the Suomen Tennisliitto.

== History ==
Finland competed in its first Davis Cup in 1928.

== Results and fixtures ==
The following are lists of match results and scheduled matches for the current year.

Win Loss Fixture

=== 2025 ===
2025 Davis Cup Qualifiers first round

Austria
4
Multiversum, Schwechat, Austria
31 January–1 February 2025
Clay (i)

Finland
0

			1	2	3
1	(Austria) (Finland)	Lukas Neumayer; Otto Virtanen	6; 4	6^{4} 7^{7}	6; 3
2	(Austria) (Finland)	Jurij Rodionov; Eero Vasa	2; 6	6; 3	6; 3
3	(Austria) (Finland)	Alexander Erler / Lucas Miedler; Patrick Kaukovalta / Patrik Niklas-Salminen	4; 6	7^{9} 6^{7}	7^{8} 6^{6}
4	(Austria) (Finland)	Filip Misolic; Eero Vasa	6; 4	6; 0
5	(Austria) (Finland)	Lukas Neumayer; Eero Vasa				not played

2025 Davis Cup World Group I

Bulgaria
3
Bulgaria
13–14 September 2025
Clay

Finland
2

			1	2	3
1	(Bulgaria) (Finland)	Alexander Vasilev; Otto Virtanen	6; 3	7; 5
2	(Bulgaria) (Finland)	Ivan Ivanov; Emil Ruusuvuori	2; 6	2; 6
3	(Bulgaria) (Finland)	Alexander Donski / Petr Nesterov; Harri Heliövaara / Otto Virtanen	6; 4	1; 6	7^{7} 6^{1}
4	(Bulgaria) (Finland)	Yanaki Milev; Eero Vasa	2; 6	2; 6
5	(Bulgaria) (Finland)	Alexander Vasilev; Emil Ruusuvuori	7^{7} 6^{5}	6; 4

=== 2026 ===
2026 Davis Cup World Group I play-offs

Hong Kong
1
Victoria Park Tennis Stadium, Hong Kong
7–8 February 2026
Hard

Finland
3

			1	2	3
1	(Hong Kong) (Finland)	Siu Chi Nicholas Cheng; Otto Virtanen	0; 6	1; 6
2	(Hong Kong) (Finland)	Coleman Wong; Eero Vasa	6; 4	6; 2
3	(Hong Kong) (Finland)	Siu Chi Nicholas Cheng / Coleman Wong; Patrik Niklas-Salminen / Otto Virtanen	4; 6	5; 7
4	(Hong Kong) (Finland)	Coleman Wong; Otto Virtanen	5; 7	2; 6
5	(Hong Kong) (Finland)	Siu Chi Nicholas Cheng; Eero Vasa				not played

2026 Davis Cup World Group I

Finland
1
Espoo Metro Areena, Espoo, Finland
18–19 September 2026
Hard (i)

Monaco
3

			1	2	3
1	(Finland) (Monaco)	Otto Virtanen; Lucas Catarina	6; 0	6; 3
2	(Finland) (Monaco)	Eero Vasa; Valentin Vacherot	3; 6	6^{3} 7^{7}
3	(Finland) (Monaco)	Harri Heliövaara / Patrik Niklas-Salminen; Romain Arneodo / Hugo Nys	6; 3	4; 6	3; 6
4	(Finland) (Monaco)	Otto Virtanen; Valentin Vacherot	6^{3} 7^{7}	6; 4	4; 6
5	(Finland) (Monaco)	Eero Vasa; Lucas Catarina				not played

== Players ==
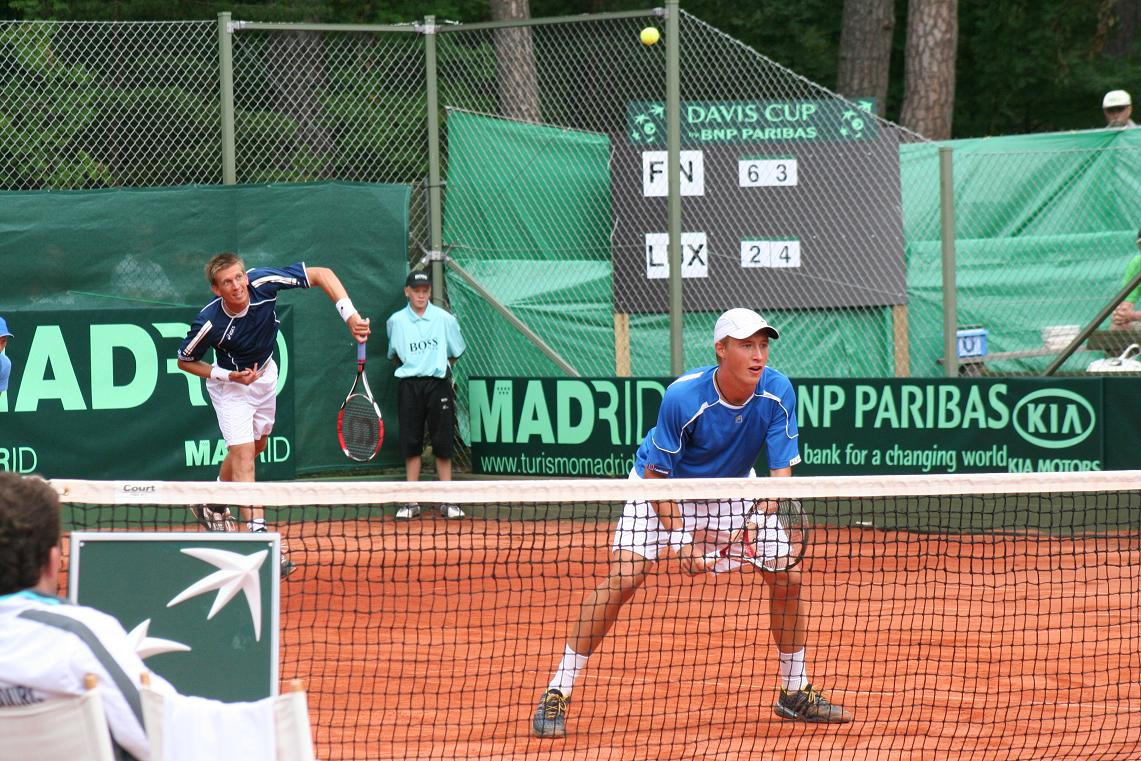
Jarkko Nieminen and Henri Kontinen in 2008

=== Current squad (2026) ===
- Otto Virtanen
- Eero Vasa
- Linus Lagerbohm
- Patrik Niklas-Salminen
- Harri Heliövaara

== Historical results ==
=== 1920s ===
Year	Competition	Date	Location	Opponent	Score	Result
1928	Europe Zone, First Round	4–6 May	Zagreb (YUG)	Yugoslavia	1–4	Win
1928	Europe Zone, Second Round	18–20 May	Helsinki (FIN)	Great Britain	0–5	Loss
1929	Europe Zone, First round	4–7 May	Helsinki (FIN)	Egypt	1–4	Loss

=== 1950s ===
Year	Competition	Date	Location	Opponent	Score	Result
1950	Europe Zone, First Round	5–7 May	Brussels (BEL)	Belgium	4–1	Loss
1951	Europe Zone, First round	4–6 May	Helsinki (FIN)	Brazil	4–1	Loss
1952	Europe Zone, First Round	8–10 May	Helsinki (FIN)	Yugoslavia	3–2	Loss
1953	Europe Zone, First Round	3–5 May	Helsinki (FIN)	Ireland	1–4	Won
1953	Europe Zone, Second Round	23–25 May	Helsinki (FIN)	Philippines	5–0	Loss
1954	Europe Zone, First round	6–8 May	Helsinki (FIN)	Norway	3–2	Loss
1955	Europe Zone, First round	29 April–1 May	Vienna (AUT)	Austria	5–0	Loss
1956	Europe Zone, First round	27–30 April	Dublin (IRL)	Ireland	4–1	Loss
1957	did not enter					
1958	Europe Zone, First round	25–27 April	Mondorf-les-Bains (LUX)	Luxembourg	0–5	Won
1958	Europe Zone, Second Round	16–18 May	Helsinki (FIN)	Mexico	5–0	Loss
1959	Europe Zone, First round	1–3 May	Helsinki (FIN)	Spain	5–0	Loss

=== 1960s ===
Year	Competition	Date	Location	Opponent	Score	Result
1960	Europe Zone, First Round	29 April–1 May	Helsinki (FIN)	Argentina	5–0	Loss
1961	Europe Zone, First round	5–7 May	Helsinki (FIN)	Turkey	1–4	Won
1961	Europe Zone, Second Round	1–3 June	Helsinki (FIN)	South Africa	4–1	Loss
1962	Europe Zone, First Round	4–6 May	Beirut (LBN)	Lebanon	1–4	Won
1962	Europe Zone, Second Round	18–20 May	Helsinki (FIN)	Czechoslovakia	5–0	Loss
1963	Europe Zone, First Round	3–5 May	Helsinki (FIN)	Soviet Union	5–0	Loss
1964	Europe Zone, First round	1–3 May	Copenhagen (DEN)	Denmark	0–5	Loss
1965	Europe Zone, First round	30 April–2 May	Helsinki (FIN)	Austria	4–1	Loss
1966	Europe Zone, A Group, First round	29 April–1 May	Helsinki (FIN)	Canada	4–1	Loss
1967	Europe Zone, A Group, First round	5–7 May	Helsinki (FIN)	Denmark	4–1	Loss
1968	Europe Zone, Group A, First round	3–5 May	Helsinki (FIN)	Portugal	1–4	Won
1968	Europe Zone, Group A, Quarterfinals	23–25 May	London (GBR)	Great Britain	5–0	Loss
1969	Europe Zone, Group A, First round	9–11 May	Helsinki (FIN)	Sweden	4–1	Loss

=== 1970s ===
Year	Competition	Date	Location	Opponent	Score	Result
1970	Europe Zone, B Group, First Round	22–24 May	Helsinki (FIN)	Belgium	4–1	Loss
1971	Europe Zone, A Group, First round	7–9 May	Helsinki (FIN)	Ireland	0–5	Won
1971	Europe Zone, A Group, Quarterfinals	14–16 May	Paris (FRA)	France	3–0	Loss
1972	Europe Zone, A Group, First Round	5–7 May	Helsinki (FIN)	Denmark	3–2	Loss
1973	Europe Zone, A Group, Pre-qualifying round	13–15 April	Athens (GRE)	Greece	3–2	Loss
1974	Europe Zone, A Group, First round	19–21 April	Helsinki (FIN)	Turkey	0–5	Won
1974	Europe Zone, A Group, Qualifying Round	10–12 May	Scheveningen (NED)	Netherlands	4–1	Loss
1975	Europe Zone, B Group, First round	27–29 September 1974	Helsinki (FIN)	Hungary	4–1	Loss
1976	Europe Zone, A Group, First round	26–28 September 1975	Copenhagen (DEN)	Denmark	4–1	Loss
1977	Europe Zone, B Group, Pre-qualifying round	28–30 August 1976	Mondorf-les-Bains (LUX)	Luxembourg	0–5	Won
1977	Europe Zone, B Group, First Round	24–26 September 1976	Vienna (AUT)	Austria	5–0	Loss
1978	Europe Zone, Group A, First round	16–18 September 1977	Tel Aviv (ISR)	Israel	5–0	Loss
1979	Europe Zone, Group A, First round	15–17 September 1978	Helsinki (FIN)	Morocco	0–5	Won
1979	Europe Zone, Group A, Qualifying Round	16–18 March 1979	Warsaw (POL)	Poland	4–1	Loss

=== 1980s ===
Year	Competition	Date	Location	Opponent	Score	Result
1980	Europe Zone, B Group, First Round	14–16 September 1979	Helsinki (FIN)	Egypt	0–5	Won
1980	Europe Zone, B Group, Qualifying Round	8–10 February 1980	Helsinki (FIN)	Poland	0–5	Won
1980	Europe Zone, B Group, Quarterfinals	7–9 March	Toulouse (FRA)	France	3–2	Loss
1981	Europe Zone, B Group, Quarterfinals	12–14 June	Helsinki (FIN)	Bulgaria	2–3	Won
1981	Europe Zone, B Group, Semifinals	9–11 July	Helsinki (FIN)	Netherlands	0–5	Loss
1982	Europe Zone, A Group, Quarterfinals	11–13 June	Athens (GRE)	Greece	2–3	Won
1982	Europe Zone, A Group, Semifinals	9–11 July	Dublin (IRL)	Ireland	4–1	Loss
1983	Europe Zone, B Group, Quarterfinals	10–12 June	Sofia (BUL)	Bulgaria	3–2	Loss
1984	Europe Zone, B Group, First round	4–6 May	Casablanca (MAR)	Morocco	0–5	Won
1984	Europe Zone, B Group, Quarterfinals	15–17 June	Dublin (IRL)	Ireland	3–2	Loss
1985	Europe Zone, B Group, First round	10–12 May	Hilversum (NED)	Netherlands	4–1	Loss
1986	Europe Zone, A Group, First round	23–25 May	Warsaw (POL)	Poland	3–2	Loss
1987	Europe Zone, B Group, First round	8–10 May	Helsinki (FIN)	Cyprus	0–5	Won
1987	Europe Zone, B Group, Quarterfinals	12–14 June	Helsinki (FIN)	Denmark	5–0	Loss
1988	Europe/Africa Zone, Group I, First round	6–8 May	Brussels (BEL)	Belgium	1–4	Won
1988	Europe/Africa Zone, Group I, Second Round	9–12 June	Bristol (GBR)	Great Britain	3–1	Loss
1989	Europe/Africa Zone, Group I, First round	3–5 February	Dublin (IRL)	Ireland	0–5	Won
1989	Europe/Africa Zone, Group I, Second Round	5–7 May	Helsinki (FIN)	Great Britain	4–1	Loss

=== 1990s ===
Year	Competition	Date	Location	Opponent	Score	Result
1990	Europe/Africa Zone, Group I, First Round	2–4 February	Lagos (NGA)	Nigeria	1–4	Won
1990	Europe/Africa Zone, Group I, Second Round	4–6 May	Aarhus (DEN)	Denmark	2–3	Won
1990	World Group qualifying round	21–23 September	Västerås (SWE)	Sweden	5–0	Loss
1991	Europe/Africa Zone, Group I, Second Round	3–5 May	Helsinki (FIN)	Denmark	3–2	Loss
1992	Europe/Africa Zone, Group I, First Round	31 January–2 February	Oslo (NOR)	Norway	2–3	Won
1992	Europe/Africa Zone, Group I, Second Round	1–3 May	Helsinki (FIN)	Austria	4–1	Loss
1993	Europe/Africa Zone, Group I, First Round	26–28 March	Budapest (HUN)	Hungary	4–1	Loss
1994	Europe/Africa Zone, Group II, First round	29 April–1 May	Helsinki (FIN)	Estonia	1–4	Won
1994	Europe/Africa Zone, Group II, Second round	15–17 July	Ljubljana (SLO)	Slovenia	3–2	Loss
1995	Europe/Africa Zone, Group II, First round	28–30 April	Abidjan (CIV)	Ivory Coast	2–3	Won
1995	Europe/Africa Zone, Group II, Second round	14–16 July	Tampere (FIN)	Ghana	0–5	Won
1995	Europe/Africa Zone, Group II, Third round	22–24 September	Helsinki (FIN)	Luxembourg	1–4	Won
1996	Europe/Africa Zone, Group I, Second Round	5–7 April	Helsinki (FIN)	Romania	3–2	Loss
1996	Europe/Africa Zone, Group I, relegation play-offs	20–22 September	Harare (ZIM)	Zimbabwe	4–1	Loss
1997	Europe/Africa Zone, Group II, First round	2–4 May	Helsinki (FIN)	Greece	2–3	Won
1997	Europe/Africa Zone, Group II, Second round	11–13 July	Tampere (FIN)	Belarus	2–3	Won
1997	Europe/Africa Zone, Group II, Third round	19–21 September	Helsinki (FIN)	Poland	2–3	Won
1998	Europe/Africa Zone, Group I, First round	13–15 February	Helsinki (FIN)	Croatia	2–3	Won
1998	Europe/Africa Zone, Group I, Second Round	3–5 April	Helsinki (FIN)	France	3–2	Loss
1999	Europe/Africa Zone, Group I, Second round	2–4 April	Helsinki (FIN)	Israel	2–3	Won
1999	World Group qualifying round	24–26 September	Sassari (ITA)	Italy	3–2	Loss

=== 2000s ===
Year	Competition	Date	Location	Opponent	Score	Result
2000	Europe/Africa Zone, Group I, Second Round	7–9 April	Helsinki (FIN)	Sweden	3–2	Loss
2000	Europe/Africa Zone, Group I, relegation play-offs	6–8 October	Helsinki (FIN)	Hungary	1–4	Won
2001	Europe/Africa Zone, Group I, First Round	9–11 February	Helsinki (FIN)	Slovenia	2–3	Won
2001	Europe/Africa Zone, Group I, Second Round	6–8 April	Helsinki (FIN)	Italy	3–2	Loss
2002	Europe/Africa Zone, Group I, Second Round	5–7 April	Reggio Calabria (ITA)	Italy	1–4	Won
2002	World Group qualifying round	20–22 September	Turku (FIN)	Netherlands	4–1	Loss
2003	Europe/Africa Zone, Group I, Second Round	4–6 April	St. Anton (AUT)	Austria	3–2	Loss
2003	Europe/Africa Zone, Group I, relegation play-offs	11–13 July	Asker (NOR)	Norway	1–4	Won
2004	Europe/Africa Zone, Group I, First Round	–	Esch-sur-Alzette (LUX)	Luxembourg	4–1	Loss
2004	Europe/Africa Zone, Group I, relegation play-offs	–	Ramat HaSharon (ISR)	Israel	3–2	Loss
2005	Europe/Africa Zone, Group II, First Round	–	Accra (GHA)	Ghana	0–5	Won
2005	Europe/Africa Zone, Group II, Second Round	–	Helsinki (FIN)	Bulgaria	3–2	Loss
2006	Europe/Africa Zone, Group II, First Round	–	–	–	–	–
2006	Europe/Africa Zone, Group II, Second Round	–	–	–	–	–
2007	Europe/Africa Zone, Group II, First Round	–	Nicosia (CYP)	Cyprus	2–3	Won
2007	Europe/Africa Zone, Group II, Second Round	–	Tampere (FIN)	Latvia	3–2	Loss
2008	Europe/Africa Zone, Group II, First Round	11–13 April	Helsinki (FIN)	South Africa	4–1	Loss
2008	Europe/Africa Zone, Group II, relegation play-offs	18–20 July	Tampere (FIN)	Luxembourg	2–3	Won
2009	Europe/Africa Zone, Group II, First Round	6–8 March	Kolding (DEN)	Denmark	2–3	Won
2009	Europe/Africa Zone, Group II, Second Round	10–12 July	Naantali (FIN)	Monaco	2–3	Won
2009	Europe/Africa Zone, Group II, Third Round	18–20 September	Salo (FIN)	Cyprus	2–3	Won

=== 2010s ===
Year	Competition	Date	Location	Opponent	Score	Result
2010	Europe/Africa Zone, Group I, First Round	5–7 March	Sopot (POL)	Poland	2–3	Won
2010	Europe/Africa Zone, Group I, Second Round	7 – 9 May	Pretoria (RSA)	South Africa	4–0	Loss
2011	Europe/Africa Zone, Group I, First Round	4–6 March	Ljubljana (SLO)	Slovenia	3–2	Loss
2011	Europe/Africa Zone, Group I, relegation play-offs	16–18 September	Espoo (FIN)	Poland	2–3	Won
2012	Europe/Africa Zone, Group I, First Round	10–12 February	's-Hertogenbosch (NED)	Netherlands	5–0	Loss
2012	Europe/Africa Zone, Group I, relegation First-Round	14–16 September	Cluj-Napoca (ROM)	Romania	3–2	Loss
2012	Europe/Africa Zone, Group I, relegation Second-Round	19–21 October	Helsinki (FIN)	Denmark	4–1	Loss
2013	Europe/Africa Zone, Group II, First Round	1–3 February	Sofia (BUL)	Bulgaria	2–3	Won
2013	Europe/Africa Zone, Group II, Second Round	5–7 April	Dublin (IRL)	Ireland	2–3	Won
2013	Europe/Africa Zone, Group II, Third Round	13–15 September	Riga (LAT)	Latvia	3–2	Loss
2014	Europe/Africa Zone, Group II, First Round	31 January – 2 February	Helsinki (FIN)	Bulgaria	2–3	Won
2014	Europe/Africa Zone, Group II, Second Round	4–6 April	Helsinki (FIN)	Bosnia and Herzegovina	3–2	Loss
2015	Europe/Africa Zone, Group II, First Round	6–8 March	Roquebrune-Cap-Martin (MON)	Monaco	2–3	Won
2015	Europe/Africa Zone, Group II, Second round	17–19 July	Viana do Castelo (POR)	Portugal	1–4	Loss
2016	Europe/Africa Zone, Group II, First Round	4–6 March	Helsinki (FIN)	Zimbabwe	1–4	Won
2016	Europe/Africa Zone, Group II, Second Round	15–17 July	Kongens Lyngby (DEN)	Denmark	3–2	Loss
2017	Europe/Africa Zone, Group II, First round	3–5 February	Tbilisi (GEO)	Georgia	3–2	Loss
2017	Europe/Africa Zone, Group II, Relegation Round	7–9 April	Hanko (FIN)	Madagascar	2–3	Won
2018	Europe/Africa Zone, Group II, First Round	3–4 February	Tunis (TUN)	Tunisia	2–3	Won
2018	Europe/Africa Zone, Group II, Second Round	7–8 April	Helsinki (FIN)	Lithuania	2–3	Won
2018	Europe/Africa Zone, Group II, Third Round	14–15 September	Cairo (EGY)	Egypt	2–3	Won
2019	Europe/Africa Zone, Group I, First Round	13–14 September	Espoo (FIN)	Austria	3–2	Loss

=== 2020s ===
Year	Competition	Date	Location	Opponent	Score	Result
2020–21	World Group I play-offs	6–7 March 2020	Metepec (MEX)	Mexico	2–3	Won
2020–21	World Group I	17–18 September 2021	Espoo (FIN)	India	1–3	Won
2022	Qualifying round	4–5 March	Espoo (FIN)	Belgium	2–3	Loss
2022	World Group I	16–17 September	Espoo (FIN)	New Zealand	0–5	Win
2023	Qualifying round	4–5 February	Espoo (FIN)	Argentina	1–3	Win
2023	Finals, Group D	12 September	Split (CRO)	Netherlands	1–2	Loss
2023	Finals, Group D	15 September	Split (CRO)	Croatia	1–2	Win
2023	Finals, Group D	16 September	Split (CRO)	United States	3–0	Win
2023	Finals, Quarterfinals	21 November	Málaga (ESP)	Canada	1–2	Win
2023	Finals, Semifinals	24 November	Málaga (ESP)	Australia	0–2	Loss
2024	Qualifying round	2–3 February	Turku (FIN)	Portugal	1–3	Win
2024	Finals, Group D	11 September	Manchester (GBR)	Great Britain	1–2	Loss
2024	Finals, Group D	12 September	Manchester (GBR)	Canada	3–0	Loss
2024	Finals, Group D	14 September	Manchester (GBR)	Argentina	3–0	Loss
2025	Qualifiers first round	31 Jan–1 Feb	Schwechat (AUT)	Austria	4–0	Loss
2025	World Group I	13–14 Sep	Plovdiv (BUL)	Bulgaria	3–2	Loss
2026	World Group I play-offs	7–8 Feb	Hong Kong (HKG)	Hong Kong	1–3	Win
2026	World Group I	18–19 Sep	Espoo (FIN)	Monaco	1–3	Loss

== See also ==
- Davis Cup
- Finland Billie Jean King Cup team
