= Veli Paloheimo =

Finnish tennis player

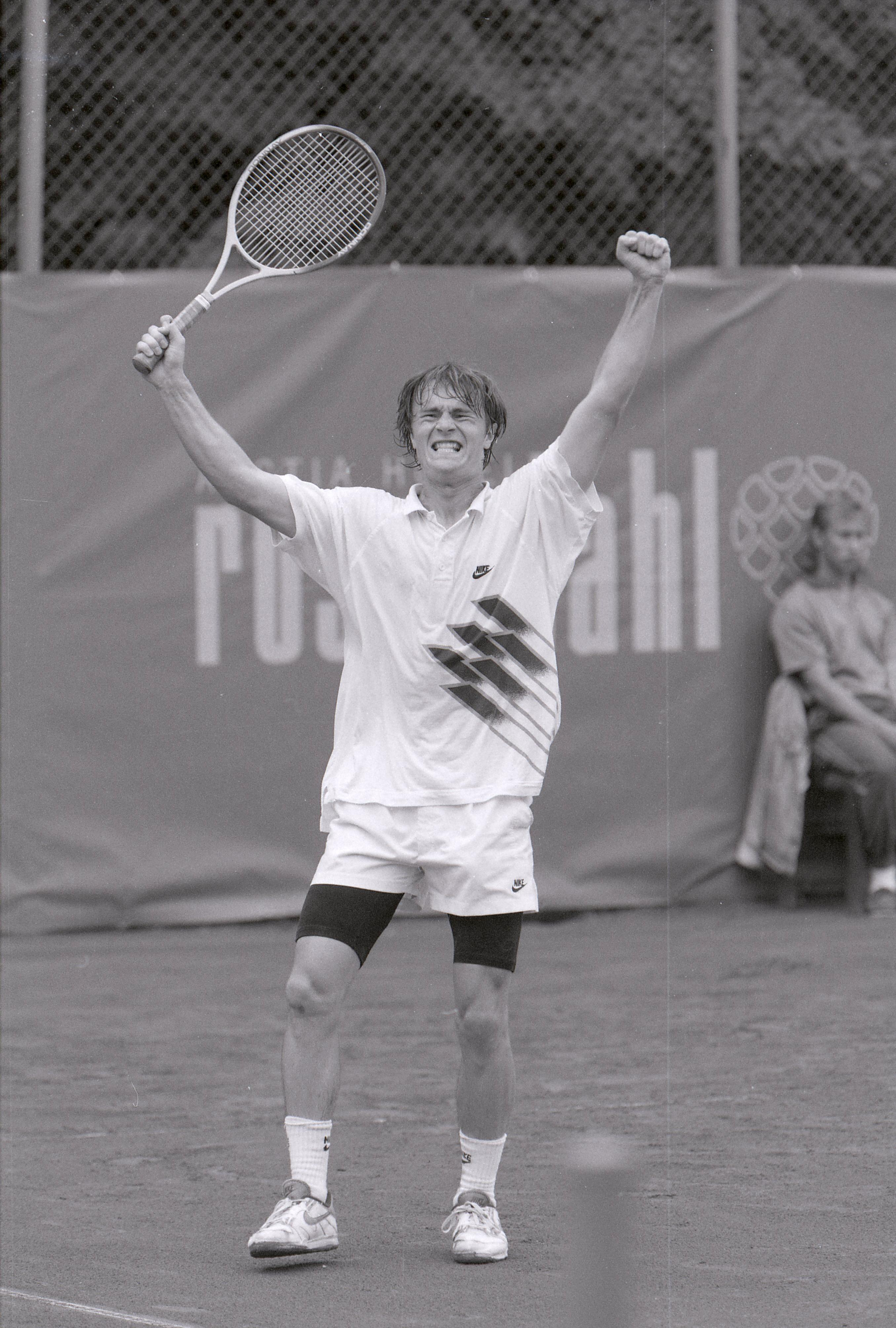
- Veli Paloheimo at the 1991 Tampere Open
- Country (sports): Finland
- Born: 13 December 1967 (age 57) Tampere, Finland
- Height: 1.83 m (6 ft 0 in)
- Plays: Right-handed
- Prize money: $353,661

Singles
- Career record: 46–60
- Career titles: 0
- Highest ranking: No. 48 (1 October 1990)

Grand Slam singles results
- Australian Open: 4R (1990)
- French Open: 2R (1991)
- Wimbledon: 1R (1989, 1990, 1991)
- US Open: 2R (1990)

Doubles
- Career record: 3–8
- Career titles: 0
- Highest ranking: No. 219 (24 July 1989)

Grand Slam doubles results
- Australian Open: 1R (1989)

Veli Paloheimo (born 13 December 1967) is a former professional tennis player from Finland.

== Career ==
The right-hander reached his highest individual ranking on the ATP Tour on 1 October 1990, reaching World number 48. His best performance at a Grand Slam came at the 1990 Australian Open, where he made the fourth round.

Paloheimo participated in 12 Davis Cup ties for Finland from 1986–1992, posting an 11–11 record in singles and a 4–5 record in doubles.

He decided to finish his sports career early in order to become a Jehovah's Witness.

His father is Finnish and his mother is German. He was born in Finland.

== Challenger finals ==
=== Singles (3-0) ===
No.	Date	Tournament	Surface	Opponent	Score
1.	1988	Helsinki	Carpet	(Sweden) Nicklas Kulti	3–6, 6–4, 6–4
2.	1989	Cherbourg	Hard (i)	(Canada) Martin Laurendeau	3–6, 6–3, 6–2
3.	1989	Brest	Hard (i)	(France) Olivier Delaître	6–2, 6–2

== See also ==
- Brother Firetribe
- List of Finland Davis Cup team representatives
