= Ville Liukko =

Finnish tennis player (born 1974)

- Country (sports): Finland
- Born: 24 May 1974 (age 50); Turku, Finland
- Height: 1.73 m (5 ft 8 in)
- Turned pro: 1995
- Plays: Right-handed
- Prize money: $114,816

Singles
- Career record: 12–13
- Career titles: 0
- Highest ranking: No. 117 (20 Sep 1999)

Grand Slam singles results
- Australian Open: Q1 (1999, 2000)
- French Open: Q2 (1999)
- Wimbledon: Q2 (2000)
- US Open: 1R (1999)

Doubles
- Career record: 4–6
- Career titles: 0
- Highest ranking: No. 216 (19 Feb 2001)

Ville Liukko (born 24 May 1974) is a former professional tennis player from Finland.

== Career ==
Liukko began playing Davis Cup tennis for the Finnish team in 1994. By the time he made his last appearance in 2001, he had taken part in 15 ties. He won 19 of his 34 rubbers, 12 in singles and seven in doubles. His doubles partnership with Tuomas Ketola is the most successful in Finland Davis Cup history, securing six wins.

The Finn made it through qualifying at the 1999 US Open and faced Goran Ivanišević in the first round. He was beaten in four sets. In the Tashkent President's Cup later that year he defeated Marat Safin, then ranked 35th in the world. Safin retired hurt in the third set, trailing 3–1, with the match level at a set apiece. He also had a win over Thomas Johansson at the Copenhagen Open in 2000.

== Challenger titles ==
=== Singles: (1) ===
No.	Year	Tournament	Surface	Opponent	Score
1.	1998	San Diego, United States	Hard	(United States) Paul Goldstein	7–5, 7–6

=== Doubles: (1) ===
No.	Year	Tournament	Surface	Partner	Opponents	Score
1.	2000	Tampere, Finland	Clay	(Finland) Jarkko Nieminen	(Australia) Steven Randjelovic (Federal Republic of Yugoslavia) Dušan Vemić	6–0, 4–6, 6–3

== See also ==
- List of Finland Davis Cup team representatives
