= 1982 Davis Cup Europe Zone =

International tennis competition

The Europe Zone was one of the three regional zones of the 1982 Davis Cup.

22 teams entered the Europe Zone in total, split across two sub-zones. The winner of each sub-zone was promoted to the following year's World Group.

Ireland defeated Switzerland in the Zone A final, and Denmark defeated Hungary in the Zone B final, resulting in both Ireland and Denmark being promoted to the 1983 World Group.

== Participating nations ==
Zone A:

- Algeria
- Austria
- Finland
- Greece
- Ireland
- Luxembourg
- Monaco
- Morocco
- Poland
- Switzerland
- Turkey

Zone B:

- Belgium
- Bulgaria
- Denmark
- Egypt
- Hungary
- Israel
- Netherlands
- Norway
- Portugal
- Tunisia
- Yugoslavia

== Zone A ==
=== Draw ===
First round 7–9 May
Dublin, Ireland (indoor hard)
Ireland	5
Luxembourg	0
bye
Monaco
Ankara, Turkey (clay)
Turkey	0
Greece	5
bye
Finland
Austria
bye
bye
Algeria
Casablanca, Morocco (clay)
Morocco	3
Poland	2
bye
Switzerland

Quarterfinals; 11–13 June
Dublin, Ireland (hard)
Ireland	4
Monaco	1
Athens, Greece (clay)
Greece	2
Finland	3
Vienna, Austria (clay)
Austria	5
Algeria	0
Casablanca, Morocco (clay)
Morocco	0
Switzerland	5

Semifinals; 9–11 July; 6–8 August
Dublin, Ireland (hard)
Ireland	4
Finland	1
Pörtschach, Austria (clay)
Austria	0
Switzerland	4

Final; 1–3 October
Dublin, Ireland (hard)
Ireland	4
Switzerland	1

=== First round ===
==== Ireland vs. Luxembourg ====
Ireland
5
Fitzwilliam Lawn Tennis Club, Dublin, Ireland
7–9 May 1982
Hard (indoors)

Luxembourg
0

			1	2	3	4	5
1	(Republic of Ireland) (Luxembourg)	Sean Sorensen; Johny Goudenbour	6; 1	6; 1	6; 2
2	(Republic of Ireland) (Luxembourg)	Matt Doyle; Paul Hoffmann	6; 0	6; 1	6; 0
3	(Republic of Ireland) (Luxembourg)	Tommy Burke / Peter Hannon; Johny Goudenbour / Stefan Kinsch	6; 2	6; 3	6; 4
4	(Republic of Ireland) (Luxembourg)	Sean Sorensen; Paul Hoffmann	6; 2	6; 2	6; 1
5	(Republic of Ireland) (Luxembourg)	Matt Doyle; Johny Goudenbour	7; 5	6; 4	6; 4

==== Turkey vs. Greece ====
Turkey
0
Ankara Tennis Club, Ankara, Turkey
7–9 May 1982
Clay

Greece
5

			1	2	3	4	5
1	(Turkey) (Greece)	Necvet Demir; Athanasios Anastopoulos	6; 3	4; 6	0; 6	6; 1	4; 6
2	(Turkey) (Greece)	Bülent Altınkaya; George Kalovelonis	3; 6	3; 6	3; 6
3	(Turkey) (Greece)	Bülent Altınkaya / Necvet Demir; Athanasios Anastopoulos / George Kalovelonis	4; 6	10; 8	6; 3	5; 7	0; 6
4	(Turkey) (Greece)	Bülent Altınkaya; Athanasios Anastopoulos	4; 6	4; 6	4; 6
5	(Turkey) (Greece)	Necvet Demir; George Kalovelonis	2; 6	5; 7	7; 9

==== Morocco vs. Poland ====
Morocco
3
Al Amal Stadium, Casablanca, Morocco
7–9 May 1982
Clay

Poland
2

			1	2	3	4	5
1	(Morocco) (Poland)	Omar Laimina; Henryk Drzymalski	6; 4	6; 2	6; 4
2	(Morocco) (Poland)	Mohammed Dlimi; Witold Meres	4; 6	6; 4	4; 6	6; 3	3; 6
3	(Morocco) (Poland)	Omar Laimina / Houcine Saber; Henryk Drzymalski / Witold Meres	9; 7	6; 2	5; 7	6; 3
4	(Morocco) (Poland)	Houcine Saber; Henryk Drzymalski	3; 6	6; 1	5; 7	4; 6
5	(Morocco) (Poland)	Omar Laimina; Witold Meres	6; 8	6; 3	8; 6	6; 2

=== Quarterfinals ===
==== Ireland vs. Monaco ====
Ireland
4
Fitzwilliam Lawn Tennis Club, Dublin, Ireland
11–13 June 1982
Hard

Monaco
1

			1	2	3	4	5
1	(Republic of Ireland) (Monaco)	Sean Sorensen; Bernard Balleret	6; 3	6; 3	6; 1
2	(Republic of Ireland) (Monaco)	Matt Doyle; Louis Borfiga	6; 1	6; 3	6; 3
3	(Republic of Ireland) (Monaco)	Tommy Burke / Sean Sorensen; Bernard Balleret / Louis Borfiga	5; 7	7; 9	10; 8	6; 3	8; 6
4	(Republic of Ireland) (Monaco)	Sean Sorensen; Louis Borfiga	6; 1	6; 1	6; 2
5	(Republic of Ireland) (Monaco)	Peter Hannon; Eric Carlier	4; 6	1; 6	3; 6

==== Greece vs. Finland ====
Greece
2
Athens, Greece
11–13 June 1982
Clay

Finland
3

			1	2	3	4	5
1	(Greece) (Finland)	George Kalovelonis; Kimmo Alkio	6; 1	6; 4	6; 3
2	(Greece) (Finland)	Athanasios Anastopoulos; Leo Palin	2; 6	1; 6	6; 2	1; 6
3	(Greece) (Finland)	Athanasios Anastopoulos / George Kalovelonis; Kimmo Alkio / Leo Palin	16; 18	4; 6	4; 6
4	(Greece) (Finland)	George Kalovelonis; Leo Palin	6; 1	2; 6	1; 6	3; 6
5	(Greece) (Finland)	Fotis Vazeos; Olli Rahnasto	9; 7	7; 5

==== Austria vs. Algeria ====
Austria
5
Post SV Wien, Vienna, Austria
11–13 June 1982
Clay

Algeria
0

			1	2	3	4	5
1	(Austria) (Algeria)	Robert Reininger; Djamel Boudjemline	6; 3	6; 1	6; 4
2	(Austria) (Algeria)	Hans-Peter Kandler; Yassine Amier	6; 0	6; 1	6; 3
3	(Austria) (Algeria)	Gerald Mild / Ingo Wimmer; Yassine Amier / Djamel Boudjemline	6; 3	6; 0	6; 3
4	(Austria) (Algeria)	Robert Reininger; Yassine Amier	6; 1	6; 0	6; 3
5	(Austria) (Algeria)	Hans-Peter Kandler; Djamel Boudjemline	6; 1	6; 3	9; 7

==== Morocco vs. Switzerland ====
Morocco
0
Al Amal Stadium, Casablanca, Morocco
11–13 June 1982
Clay

Switzerland
5

			1	2	3	4	5
1	(Morocco) (Switzerland)	Mohammed Dlimi; Ivan Dupasquier	2; 6	8; 10	6; 4	3; 6
2	(Morocco) (Switzerland)	Omar Laimina; Heinz Günthardt	6; 2	6; 2	1; 6	3; 6	0; 6
3	(Morocco) (Switzerland)	Mohammed Dlimi / Omar Laimina; Heinz Günthardt / Markus Günthardt	6; 8	5; 7	2; 6
4	(Morocco) (Switzerland)	Omar Laimina; Roland Stadler	4; 6	1; 6	5; 7
5	(Morocco) (Switzerland)	Mohammed Dlimi; Heinz Günthardt	3; 6	0; 6	2; 6

=== Semifinals ===
==== Ireland vs. Finland ====
Ireland
4
Fitzwilliam Lawn Tennis Club, Dublin, Ireland
9–11 July 1982
Hard

Finland
1

			1	2	3	4	5
1	(Republic of Ireland) (Finland)	Matt Doyle; Leo Palin	6; 2	6; 1	6; 0
2	(Republic of Ireland) (Finland)	Sean Sorensen; Matti Timonen	6; 2	7; 5	6; 3
3	(Republic of Ireland) (Finland)	Matt Doyle / Sean Sorensen; Kimmo Alkio / Leo Palin	6; 3	6; 4	6; 4
4	(Republic of Ireland) (Finland)	Matt Doyle; Matti Timonen	6; 2	6; 2
5	(Republic of Ireland) (Finland)	Robert Dolan; Kimmo Alkio	2; 6	3; 6

==== Austria vs. Switzerland ====
Austria
0
Werzer Arena, Pörtschach, Austria
6–8 August 1982
Clay

Switzerland
4

			1	2	3	4	5
1	(Austria) (Switzerland)	Robert Reininger; Heinz Günthardt	4; 6	4; 6	1; 6
2	(Austria) (Switzerland)	Hans-Peter Kandler; Roland Stadler	1; 6	3; 6	1; 6
3	(Austria) (Switzerland)	Gerald Mild / Ingo Wimmer; Heinz Günthardt / Markus Günthardt	2; 6	2; 6	4; 6
4	(Austria) (Switzerland)	Hans-Peter Kandler; Heinz Günthardt	3; 6	5; 7	6; 4	4; 6
5	(Austria) (Switzerland)	Robert Reininger; Roland Stadler	8; 6	8; 6	1; 1			not completed

=== Final ===
==== Ireland vs. Switzerland ====
Ireland
4
Fitzwilliam Lawn Tennis Club, Dublin, Ireland
1–3 October 1982
Hard

Switzerland
1

			1	2	3	4	5
1	(Republic of Ireland) (Switzerland)	Matt Doyle; Heinz Günthardt	6; 0	6; 4	6; 0
2	(Republic of Ireland) (Switzerland)	Sean Sorensen; Roland Stadler	6; 3	3; 6	8; 6	9; 7
3	(Republic of Ireland) (Switzerland)	Matt Doyle / Sean Sorensen; Heinz Günthardt / Markus Günthardt	6; 8	2; 6	5; 7
4	(Republic of Ireland) (Switzerland)	Matt Doyle; Roland Stadler	6; 4	6; 2	6; 4
5	(Republic of Ireland) (Switzerland)	Sean Sorensen; Jakob Hlasek	7; 5	7; 5

== Zone B ==
=== Draw ===
First round 7–9 May
Hungary
bye
Varaždin, Yugoslavia (clay)
Norway	0
Yugoslavia	5
Israel
bye
bye
Belgium
Porto, Portugal (clay)
Portugal	5
Tunisia	0
bye
Egypt
Sofia, Bulgaria (clay)
Denmark	4
Bulgaria	1
bye
Netherlands

Quarterfinals; 11–13 June
Budapest, Hungary (clay)
Hungary	3
Yugoslavia	2
Eupen, Belgium (clay)
Israel	3
Belgium	0
Lisbon, Portugal (clay)
Portugal	0
Egypt	5
Hørsholm, Denmark (clay)
Denmark	3
Netherlands	0

Semifinals; 9–11 July
Budapest, Hungary (clay)
Hungary	4
Israel	1
Aarhus, Denmark (clay)
Egypt	1
Denmark	4

Final; 1–3 October
Budapest, Hungary (clay)
Hungary	2
Denmark	3

=== First round ===
==== Yugoslavia vs. Norway ====
Yugoslavia
5
Teniski klub Varteks, Varaždin, Yugoslavia
7–9 May 1982
Clay

Norway
0

			1	2	3	4	5
1	(Socialist Federal Republic of Yugoslavia) (Norway)	Marko Ostoja; Jan Svensen	6; 3	6; 1	6; 2
2	(Socialist Federal Republic of Yugoslavia) (Norway)	Slobodan Živojinović; Morten Rønneberg	6; 1	6; 2	4; 6	7; 9	6; 0
3	(Socialist Federal Republic of Yugoslavia) (Norway)	Marko Ostoja / Slobodan Živojinović; Gisle Pedersen-Jentoft / Jan Svensen	6; 2	6; 1	6; 1
4	(Socialist Federal Republic of Yugoslavia) (Norway)	Zoran Petković; Jan Svensen	9; 7	6; 1	6; 1
5	(Socialist Federal Republic of Yugoslavia) (Norway)	Branko Horvat; Gisle Pedersen-Jentoft	6; 3	6; 3	6; 4

==== Portugal vs. Tunisia ====
Portugal
5
Lawn Tennis Club da Foz, Porto, Portugal
7–9 May 1982
Clay

Tunisia
0

			1	2	3	4	5
1	(Portugal) (Tunisia)	Pedro Cordeiro; Raouf Ben Farhat	6; 1	6; 1	6; 3
2	(Portugal) (Tunisia)	Miguel Soares; Abdel-Aziz Zouhir	6; 0	6; 2	6; 3
3	(Portugal) (Tunisia)	Pedro Cordeiro / Miguel Soares; Raouf Ben Farhat / Abdel-Aziz Zouhir	6; 0	6; 4	6; 3
4	(Portugal) (Tunisia)	João Guedes; Ikbel Hanachi	6; 3	6; 2
5	(Portugal) (Tunisia)	Manuel de Sousa; Abdel-Aziz Zouhir	6; 3	6; 1

==== Bulgaria vs. Denmark ====
Bulgaria
1
Sofia, Bulgaria
7–9 May 1982
Clay

Denmark
4

			1	2	3	4	5
1	(Bulgaria) (Denmark)	Bozhidar Pampoulov; Peter Bastiansen	8; 6	3; 6	6; 2			retired
2	(Bulgaria) (Denmark)	Julian Stamatov; Michael Mortensen	2; 6	9; 7	3; 6	7; 5	5; 7
3	(Bulgaria) (Denmark)	Bozhidar Pampoulov / Matei Pampoulov; Peter Bastiansen / Michael Mortensen	4; 6	4; 6	2; 6
4	(Bulgaria) (Denmark)	Julian Stamatov; Peter Bastiansen	0; 6	1; 6	0; 6
5	(Bulgaria) (Denmark)	Bozhidar Pampoulov; Michael Mortensen	2; 6	2; 6

=== Quarterfinals ===
==== Hungary vs. Yugoslavia ====
Hungary
3
Budapest, Hungary
11–13 June 1982
Clay

Yugoslavia
2

			1	2	3	4	5
1	(Hungary) (Socialist Federal Republic of Yugoslavia)	Balázs Taróczy; Slobodan Živojinović	6; 2	6; 2	6; 0
2	(Hungary) (Socialist Federal Republic of Yugoslavia)	János Benyik; Marko Ostoja	7; 5	3; 6	1; 6	4; 6
3	(Hungary) (Socialist Federal Republic of Yugoslavia)	Péter Szőke / Balázs Taróczy; Marko Ostoja / Slobodan Živojinović	6; 2	7; 5	8; 6
4	(Hungary) (Socialist Federal Republic of Yugoslavia)	János Benyik; Slobodan Živojinović	8; 6	6; 4	2; 6	3; 6	2; 6
5	(Hungary) (Socialist Federal Republic of Yugoslavia)	Balázs Taróczy; Marko Ostoja	6; 3	6; 2	9; 7

==== Belgium vs. Israel ====
Belgium
0
Tennisclub Eupen, Eupen, Belgium
11–13 June 1982
Clay

Israel
3

			1	2	3	4	5
1	(Belgium) (Israel)	Jacques Grandjean; Shahar Perkiss	3; 6	6; 3	8; 6	0; 6	5; 7
2	(Belgium) (Israel)	Bernard Boileau; Shlomo Glickstein	6; 3	6; 8	3; 6	6; 4	4; 6
3	(Belgium) (Israel)	Bernard Boileau / Thierry Stevaux; Shlomo Glickstein / David Schneider	1; 6	12; 10	9; 7	4; 6	2; 6
4	(Belgium) (Israel)	Bernard Boileau; Shahar Perkiss						not played
5	(Belgium) (Israel)	Jacques Grandjean; Shlomo Glickstein						not played

==== Portugal vs. Egypt ====
Portugal
0
Estádio Nacional, Lisbon, Portugal
11–13 June 1982
Clay

Egypt
5

			1	2	3	4	5
1	(Portugal) (Egypt)	Miguel Soares; Tarek-Shawki El Sakka	6; 4	3; 6	4; 6	4; 6
2	(Portugal) (Egypt)	Pedro Cordeiro; Ahmed El-Mehelmy	4; 6	3; 6	6; 2	6; 1	6; 8
3	(Portugal) (Egypt)	Pedro Cordeiro / Miguel Soares; Ahmed El-Mehelmy / Ismail El Shafei	4; 6	2; 6	4; 6
4	(Portugal) (Egypt)	Miguel Soares; Ahmed El-Mehelmy	5; 7	3; 6
5	(Portugal) (Egypt)	Pedro Cordeiro; Tarek-Shawki El Sakka	7; 9	2; 6

==== Denmark vs. Netherlands ====
Denmark
3
Hørsholm, Denmark
11–13 June 1982
Clay

Netherlands
0

			1	2	3	4	5
1	(Denmark) (Netherlands)	Michael Mortensen; Louk Sanders	6; 8	4; 6	8; 6	6; 2	6; 2
2	(Denmark) (Netherlands)	Peter Bastiansen; Michiel Schapers	6; 4	6; 3	6; 2
3	(Denmark) (Netherlands)	Peter Bastiansen / Michael Mortensen; Huub van Boeckel / Michiel Schapers	8; 10	6; 4	6; 4	5; 7	9; 7
4	(Denmark) (Netherlands)	Michael Mortensen; Michiel Schapers						not played
5	(Denmark) (Netherlands)	Peter Bastiansen; Louk Sanders						not played

=== Semifinals ===
==== Hungary vs. Israel ====
Hungary
4
Budapest, Hungary
9–11 July 1982
Clay

Israel
1

			1	2	3	4	5
1	(Hungary) (Israel)	Balázs Taróczy; Shahar Perkiss	7; 5	6; 4	6; 2
2	(Hungary) (Israel)	János Benyik; Shlomo Glickstein	1; 6	0; 6	2; 6
3	(Hungary) (Israel)	Péter Szőke / Balázs Taróczy; Shlomo Glickstein / David Schneider	3; 6	6; 3	2; 6	7; 5	8; 6
4	(Hungary) (Israel)	János Benyik; Shahar Perkiss	5; 7	8; 6	6; 2	9; 7
5	(Hungary) (Israel)	Balázs Taróczy; Shlomo Glickstein	7; 5	6; 2

==== Denmark vs. Egypt ====
Denmark
4
Aarhus, Denmark
9–11 July 1982
Clay

Egypt
1

			1	2	3	4	5
1	(Denmark) (Egypt)	Michael Mortensen; Ahmed El-Mehelmy	6; 4	4; 6	6; 3	6; 4
2	(Denmark) (Egypt)	Peter Bastiansen; Tarek-Shawki El Sakka	6; 1	6; 0	5; 7	6; 4
3	(Denmark) (Egypt)	Peter Bastiansen / Michael Mortensen; Ahmed El-Mehelmy / Tarek-Shawki El Sakka	5; 7	6; 1	6; 3	6; 1
4	(Denmark) (Egypt)	Peter Bastiansen; Ahmed El-Mehelmy	6; 3	6; 0
5	(Denmark) (Egypt)	Michael Mortensen; Tarek-Shawki El Sakka	1; 6	6; 4	3; 6

=== Final ===
==== Hungary vs. Denmark ====
Hungary
2
Budapest, Hungary
1–3 October 1982
Clay

Denmark
3

			1	2	3	4	5
1	(Hungary) (Denmark)	Róbert Machán; Peter Bastiansen	6; 4	2; 6	6; 2	4; 6	2; 6
2	(Hungary) (Denmark)	Balázs Taróczy; Michael Mortensen	6; 1	6; 3	6; 3
3	(Hungary) (Denmark)	Péter Szőke / Balázs Taróczy; Peter Bastiansen / Michael Mortensen	6; 2	7; 5	6; 0
4	(Hungary) (Denmark)	Balázs Taróczy; Peter Bastiansen	4; 6	4; 6	6; 2	6; 8
5	(Hungary) (Denmark)	Róbert Machán; Michael Mortensen	2; 6	6; 3	7; 9	9; 11
