= 1985 Davis Cup Europe Zone =

International tennis competition

The Europe Zone was one of the three regional zones of the 1985 Davis Cup.

27 teams entered the Europe Zone in total, split across two sub-zones. The winner of each sub-zone was promoted to the following year's World Group.

Denmark defeated Romania in the Zone A final, and Great Britain defeated Israel in the Zone B final, resulting in both Denmark and Great Britain being promoted to the 1986 World Group.

== Participating nations ==
Zone A:

- Algeria
- Belgium
- Bulgaria
- Cyprus
- Denmark
- Egypt
- Hungary
- Iran
- Ireland
- Monaco
- Morocco
- Romania
- Senegal
- Turkey

Zone B:

- Austria
- Finland
- Great Britain
- Greece
- Israel
- Luxembourg
- Netherlands
- Norway
- Poland
- Portugal
- Switzerland
- Tunisia
- Zimbabwe

== Zone A ==
=== Draw ===
First round 10–12 May
Romania
bye
Turkey	w/o
Iran
Casablanca, Morocco (clay)
Hungary	4
Morocco	1
Cairo, Egypt (clay)
Egypt	4
Algeria	1
Dakar, Senegal (hard)
Senegal	1
Monaco	4
Nicosia, Cyprus (clay)
Cyprus	1
Ireland	4
Brussels, Belgium (clay)
Bulgaria	1
Belgium	3
bye
Denmark

Quarterfinals; 14–16 June
Istanbul, Turkey (clay)
Romania	5
Turkey	0
Cairo, Egypt (clay)
Hungary	2
Egypt	3
Monte Carlo, Monaco (clay)
Monaco	3
Ireland	2
Holte, Denmark (clay)
Belgium	0
Denmark	5

Semifinals; 2–4 August
Bucharest, Romania (clay)
Romania	4
Egypt	1
Monte Carlo, Monaco (clay)
Monaco	0
Denmark	5

Final; 4–6 October
Bucharest, Romania (clay)
Romania	2
Denmark	3

=== First round ===
==== Morocco vs. Hungary ====
Morocco
1
Al Amal Stadium, Casablanca, Morocco
10–12 May 1985
Clay

Hungary
4

			1	2	3	4	5
1	(Morocco) (Hungary)	Arafat Chekrouni; Ferenc Zentai	6; 4	7; 9	6; 4	2; 6	6; 1
2	(Morocco) (Hungary)	Houcine Saber; Balázs Taróczy	6; 3	3; 6	6; 4	4; 6	2; 6
3	(Morocco) (Hungary)	Arafat Chekrouni / Houcine Saber; Róbert Machán / Balázs Taróczy	2; 6	2; 6	4; 6
4	(Morocco) (Hungary)	Houcine Saber; Ferenc Zentai	6; 4	7; 9	4; 6	0; 6
5	(Morocco) (Hungary)	Arafat Chekrouni; Balázs Taróczy	12; 14	1; 6

==== Egypt vs. Algeria ====
Egypt
4
Gezira Sporting Club, Cairo, Egypt
10–12 May 1985
Clay

Algeria
1

			1	2	3	4	5
1	(Egypt) (Algeria)	Ahmed El-Mehelmy; Abdel-Halim Azzi	6; 0	6; 0	3; 6	2; 6	6; 3
2	(Egypt) (Algeria)	Tarek-Shawki El Sakka; Djamel Boudjemline	6; 1	6; 4	6; 3
3	(Egypt) (Algeria)	Ahmed El-Mehelmy / Tarek-Shawki El Sakka; Abdel-Halim Azzi / Reda Galou	7; 5	3; 6	6; 3	3; 6	6; 2
4	(Egypt) (Algeria)	Ahmed El-Mehelmy; Djamel Boudjemline	2; 6	7; 5	3; 6
5	(Egypt) (Algeria)	Tarek-Shawki El Sakka; Kamel Harrad	6; 3	6; 2

==== Senegal vs. Monaco ====
Senegal
1
Iba Mar Diop Stadium, Dakar, Senegal
10–12 May 1985
Hard

Monaco
4

			1	2	3	4	5
1	(Senegal) (Monaco)	Nagy Kabaz; Bernard Balleret	2; 6	2; 6	1; 6
2	(Senegal) (Monaco)	Yahiya Doumbia; Gilles Ganancia	6; 2	6; 3	6; 1
3	(Senegal) (Monaco)	Yahiya Doumbia / Nagy Kabaz; Bernard Balleret / Jacques Vinciléoni	6; 4	11; 9	4; 6	9; 11	3; 6
4	(Senegal) (Monaco)	Nagy Kabaz; Gilles Ganancia	2; 6	3; 6	2; 6
5	(Senegal) (Monaco)	Miloud Doumbia; Albert Viviani	4; 6	7; 5	4; 6

==== Cyprus vs. Ireland ====
Cyprus
1
Field Club, Nicosia, Cyprus
10–12 May 1985
Clay

Ireland
4

			1	2	3	4	5
1	(Cyprus) (Republic of Ireland)	Yiannos Hadjigeorgiou; Matt Doyle	0; 6	1; 6	3; 6
2	(Cyprus) (Republic of Ireland)	Alkis Papamichael; Sean Sorensen	1; 6	4; 6	6; 8
3	(Cyprus) (Republic of Ireland)	Haig Ashdjian / Phivos Zachariades; Matt Doyle / Sean Sorensen	1; 6	2; 6	4; 6
4	(Cyprus) (Republic of Ireland)	Alkis Papamichael; Matt Doyle	3; 6	7; 5	6; 4
5	(Cyprus) (Republic of Ireland)	Yiannos Hadjigeorgiou; Sean Sorensen	2; 6	1; 6

==== Belgium vs. Bulgaria ====
Belgium
3
Royal Primerose Tennis Club, Brussels, Belgium
10–12 May 1985
Clay

Bulgaria
1

			1	2	3	4	5
1	(Belgium) (Bulgaria)	Jan Vanlangendonck; Krassimir Lazarov	6; 2	2; 6	6; 4	7; 5
2	(Belgium) (Bulgaria)	Karel Demuynck; Julian Stamatov	5; 7	6; 3	1; 6	9; 7	4; 6
3	(Belgium) (Bulgaria)	Alain Brichant / Jan Vanlangendonck; Krassimir Lazarov / Marian Lazarov	6; 2	6; 1	6; 0
4	(Belgium) (Bulgaria)	Karel Demuynck; Krassimir Lazarov	6; 3	4; 6	6; 4	2; 6	6; 4
5	(Belgium) (Bulgaria)	Jan Vanlangendonck; Julian Stamatov						not played

=== Quarterfinals ===
==== Turkey vs. Romania ====
Turkey
0
T.E.D. Club, Istanbul, Turkey
14–16 June 1985
Clay

Romania
5

			1	2	3	4	5
1	(Turkey) (Romania)	Yavuz Erkangil; Florin Segărceanu	3; 6	0; 6	1; 6
2	(Turkey) (Romania)	Necvet Demir; Adrian Marcu	2; 6	2; 6	1; 6
3	(Turkey) (Romania)	Yavuz Erkangil / Alaaddin Karagöz; Andrei Dîrzu / Florin Segărceanu	4; 6	3; 6	2; 6
4	(Turkey) (Romania)	Alaaddin Karagöz; Florin Segărceanu	0; 6	1; 6
5	(Turkey) (Romania)	Yavuz Erkangil; Adrian Marcu	3; 6	2; 6

==== Egypt vs. Hungary ====
Egypt
3
Gezira Sporting Club, Cairo, Egypt
14–16 June 1985
Clay

Hungary
2

			1	2	3	4	5
1	(Egypt) (Hungary)	Ahmed El-Mehelmy; Ferenc Zentai	6; 1	6; 2	6; 4
2	(Egypt) (Hungary)	Tarek-Shawki El Sakka; Balázs Taróczy	5; 7	4; 6	0; 6
3	(Egypt) (Hungary)	Ahmed El-Mehelmy / Tarek-Shawki El Sakka; Róbert Machán / Balázs Taróczy	5; 7	7; 5	11; 9	3; 6	10; 8
4	(Egypt) (Hungary)	Tarek-Shawki El Sakka; Ferenc Zentai	6; 4	6; 4	7; 5
5	(Egypt) (Hungary)	Ahmed El-Mehelmy; Balázs Taróczy	5; 7	4; 6

==== Monaco vs. Ireland ====
Monaco
3
Monte Carlo, Monaco
14–16 June 1985
Clay

Ireland
2

			1	2	3	4	5
1	(Monaco) (Republic of Ireland)	Gilles Ganancia; Matt Doyle	7; 5	6; 4	4; 6	0; 6	4; 6
2	(Monaco) (Republic of Ireland)	Bernard Balleret; Sean Sorensen	7; 5	2; 6	5; 7	2; 6
3	(Monaco) (Republic of Ireland)	Bernard Balleret / Jacques Vinciléoni; Matt Doyle / Sean Sorensen	6; 3	2; 6	4; 6	6; 4	6; 4
4	(Monaco) (Republic of Ireland)	Bernard Balleret; Matt Doyle	6; 3	6; 3	6; 3
5	(Monaco) (Republic of Ireland)	Gilles Ganancia; Sean Sorensen	8; 6	3; 6	3; 6	6; 4	9; 7

==== Denmark vs. Belgium ====
Denmark
5
Holte, Denmark
14–16 June 1985
Clay

Belgium
0

			1	2	3	4	5
1	(Denmark) (Belgium)	Peter Bastiansen; Bernard Boileau	6; 3	5; 7	6; 4	6; 3
2	(Denmark) (Belgium)	Michael Mortensen; Jan Vanlangendonck	5; 7	1; 6	6; 1	6; 1	6; 3
3	(Denmark) (Belgium)	Peter Bastiansen / Michael Mortensen; Alain Brichant / Jan Vanlangendonck	6; 4	3; 6	6; 2	6; 3
4	(Denmark) (Belgium)	Michael Mortensen; Bernard Boileau	6; 2	6; 2
5	(Denmark) (Belgium)	Peter Bastiansen; Jan Vanlangendonck	6; 3	6; 1

=== Semifinals ===
==== Romania vs. Egypt ====
Romania
4
Bucharest, Romania
2–4 August 1985
Clay

Egypt
1

			1	2	3	4	5
1	(Romania) (Egypt)	Florin Segărceanu; Tarek-Shawki El Sakka	7; 5	3; 6	6; 0	6; 2
2	(Romania) (Egypt)	Andrei Dîrzu; Ahmed El-Mehelmy	8; 6	6; 3	6; 1
3	(Romania) (Egypt)	Andrei Dîrzu / Florin Segărceanu; Ahmed El-Mehelmy / Tarek-Shawki El Sakka	6; 3	3; 6	6; 3	6; 3
4	(Romania) (Egypt)	Florin Segărceanu; Ahmed El-Mehelmy	6; 3	6; 2
5	(Romania) (Egypt)	Andrei Dîrzu; Tarek-Shawki El Sakka	4; 6	2; 6

==== Monaco vs. Denmark ====
Monaco
0
Monte Carlo, Monaco
2–4 August 1985
Clay

Denmark
5

			1	2	3	4	5
1	(Monaco) (Denmark)	Gilles Ganancia; Michael Mortensen	3; 6	3; 6	1; 6
2	(Monaco) (Denmark)	Bernard Balleret; Peter Bastiansen	4; 6	6; 8	6; 4	6; 3	4; 6
3	(Monaco) (Denmark)	Bernard Balleret / Jacques Vinciléoni; Peter Bastiansen / Michael Mortensen	0; 6	6; 2	0; 6	9; 11
4	(Monaco) (Denmark)	Gilles Ganancia; Peter Bastiansen	1; 6	1; 6
5	(Monaco) (Denmark)	Albert Viviani; Michael Tauson	4; 6	4; 6

=== Final ===
==== Romania vs. Denmark ====
Romania
2
Bucharest, Romania
4–6 October 1985
Clay

Denmark
3

			1	2	3	4	5
1	(Romania) (Denmark)	Adrian Marcu; Peter Bastiansen	6; 1	4; 6	1; 6	2; 6
2	(Romania) (Denmark)	Florin Segărceanu; Michael Tauson	6; 3	6; 1	6; 3
3	(Romania) (Denmark)	Ilie Năstase / Florin Segărceanu; Peter Bastiansen / Michael Mortensen	3; 6	4; 6	7; 9
4	(Romania) (Denmark)	Florin Segărceanu; Peter Bastiansen	8; 6	2; 6	6; 4	6; 2
5	(Romania) (Denmark)	Adrian Marcu; Michael Tauson	4; 6	6; 3	1; 6	5; 7

== Zone B ==
=== Draw ===
First round 10–12 May
Israel
bye
Hilversum, Netherlands (clay)
Finland	1
Netherlands	4
Austria
bye
Athens, Greece (clay)
Norway	1
Greece	4
Warsaw, Poland (clay)
Poland	2
Zimbabwe	3
Tunis, Tunisia (clay)
Tunisia	0
Switzerland	5
Lisbon, Portugal (clay)
Portugal	5
Luxembourg	0
bye
Great Britain

Quarterfinals; 14–16 June
Ramat HaSharon, Israel (hard)
Israel	4
Netherlands	1
Athens, Greece (clay)
Austria	3
Greece	2
Weggis, Switzerland (clay)
Zimbabwe	0
Switzerland	5
Nottingham, United Kingdom (grass)
Portugal	0
Great Britain	5

Semifinals; 2–4 August
Hartberg, Austria (clay)
Israel	3
Austria	2
Eastbourne, United Kingdom (grass)
Switzerland	0
Great Britain	3

Final; 4–6 October
Eastbourne, United Kingdom (grass)
Israel	1
Great Britain	4

=== First round ===
==== Netherlands vs. Finland ====
Netherlands
4
Hilversum, Netherlands
10–12 May 1985
Clay

Finland
1

			1	2	3	4	5
1	(Netherlands) (Finland)	Menno Oosting; Leo Palin	6; 2	6; 1	6; 2
2	(Netherlands) (Finland)	Michiel Schapers; Olli Rahnasto	6; 4	0; 6	1; 6	6; 4	6; 2
3	(Netherlands) (Finland)	Huub van Boeckel / Menno Oosting; Leo Palin / Olli Rahnasto	6; 3	6; 4	6; 8	6; 3
4	(Netherlands) (Finland)	Michiel Schapers; Leo Palin	4; 6	7; 5	6; 1
5	(Netherlands) (Finland)	Menno Oosting; Olli Rahnasto	6; 8	3; 6

==== Greece vs. Norway ====
Greece
4
Athens, Greece
10–12 May 1985
Clay

Norway
1

			1	2	3	4	5
1	(Greece) (Norway)	Anastasios Bavelas; Tony Jønsson	3; 6	4; 6	6; 2	6; 0	4; 6
2	(Greece) (Norway)	George Kalovelonis; Morten Rønneberg	10; 12	6; 4	6; 2	6; 3
3	(Greece) (Norway)	Konstantinos Efraimoglou / George Kalovelonis; Morten Rønneberg / John Erik Rustad	6; 2	6; 4	6; 4
4	(Greece) (Norway)	Anastasios Bavelas; Morten Rønneberg	10; 8	6; 4	6; 2
5	(Greece) (Norway)	George Kalovelonis; Tony Jønsson	2; 6	6; 2	6; 2

==== Poland vs. Zimbabwe ====
Poland
2
Legia Warsaw, Warsaw, Poland
10–12 May 1985
Clay

Zimbabwe
3

			1	2	3	4	5
1	(Poland) (Zimbabwe)	Wojciech Kowalski; Philip Tuckniss	6; 1	6; 2	6; 4
2	(Poland) (Zimbabwe)	Waldemar Rogowski; Haroon Ismail	1; 6	6; 3	6; 3	6; 3
3	(Poland) (Zimbabwe)	Lech Bieńkowski / Wojciech Kowalski; Haroon Ismail / Philip Tuckniss	6; 8	2; 6	3; 6
4	(Poland) (Zimbabwe)	Waldemar Rogowski; Philip Tuckniss	1; 6	6; 4	6; 4	1; 6	3; 6
5	(Poland) (Zimbabwe)	Wojciech Kowalski; Haroon Ismail	8; 6	6; 3	3; 6	4; 6	2; 6

==== Tunisia vs. Switzerland ====
Tunisia
0
Tennis Club de Tunis, Tunis, Tunisia
10–12 May 1985
Clay

Switzerland
5

			1	2	3	4	5
1	(Tunisia) (Switzerland)	Hassan Soudani; Roland Stadler	1; 6	0; 6	0; 6
2	(Tunisia) (Switzerland)	Abdel-Majid Soudani; Dominik Utzinger	4; 6	4; 6	1; 6
3	(Tunisia) (Switzerland)	Abdel-Majid Soudani / Hassan Soudani; Markus Günthardt / Dominik Utzinger	2; 6	3; 6	1; 6
4	(Tunisia) (Switzerland)	Abdel-Majid Soudani; Roland Stadler	0; 6	2; 6
5	(Tunisia) (Switzerland)	Elias Bramly; Dominik Utzinger	2; 6	2; 6

==== Portugal vs. Luxembourg ====
Portugal
5
Estádio Nacional, Lisbon, Portugal
10–12 May 1985
Clay

Luxembourg
0

			1	2	3	4	5
1	(Portugal) (Luxembourg)	João Cunha e Silva; Johny Goudenbour	6; 2	6; 1	6; 4
2	(Portugal) (Luxembourg)	Pedro Cordeiro; Mike van Kauvenbergh	6; 1	6; 0	6; 1
3	(Portugal) (Luxembourg)	Pedro Cordeiro / João Cunha e Silva; Georges Faber / Johny Goudenbour	6; 3	6; 2	6; 4
4	(Portugal) (Luxembourg)	Pedro Cordeiro; Johny Goudenbour	4; 6	6; 3	6; 3
5	(Portugal) (Luxembourg)	João Cunha e Silva; Mike van Kauvenbergh	6; 1	6; 3

=== Quarterfinals ===
==== Israel vs. Netherlands ====
Israel
4
Canada Stadium, Ramat HaSharon, Israel
14–16 June 1985
Hard

Netherlands
1

			1	2	3	4	5
1	(Israel) (Netherlands)	Shlomo Glickstein; Huub van Boeckel	6; 2	6; 4	11; 9
2	(Israel) (Netherlands)	Amos Mansdorf; Michiel Schapers	2; 6	9; 11	3; 6
3	(Israel) (Netherlands)	Shlomo Glickstein / Shahar Perkiss; Huub van Boeckel / Michiel Schapers	2; 6	7; 5	6; 4	6; 3
4	(Israel) (Netherlands)	Shlomo Glickstein; Michiel Schapers	4; 6	6; 1	3; 6	6; 0	6; 0
5	(Israel) (Netherlands)	Amos Mansdorf; Huub van Boeckel	10; 8	7; 5

==== Greece vs. Austria ====
Greece
2
Athens, Greece
14–16 June 1985
Clay

Austria
3

			1	2	3	4	5
1	(Greece) (Austria)	George Kalovelonis; Thomas Muster	4; 6	1; 6	1; 6
2	(Greece) (Austria)	Anastasios Bavelas; Bernhard Pils	6; 4	6; 8	7; 5	2; 6	2; 6
3	(Greece) (Austria)	Konstantinos Efraimoglou / George Kalovelonis; Alex Antonitsch / Peter Feigl	6; 8	3; 6	5; 7
4	(Greece) (Austria)	Fotis Vazeos; Alex Antonitsch	3; 6	6; 3	6; 4
5	(Greece) (Austria)	George Kalovelonis; Bernhard Pils	6; 4	6; 4

==== Switzerland vs. Zimbabwe ====
Switzerland
5
Tennisclub Weggis, Weggis, Switzerland
14–16 June 1985
Clay

Zimbabwe
0

			1	2	3	4	5
1	(Switzerland) (Zimbabwe)	Heinz Günthardt; Haroon Ismail	6; 0	6; 1	6; 1
2	(Switzerland) (Zimbabwe)	Jakob Hlasek; Philip Tuckniss	6; 2	6; 2	6; 4
3	(Switzerland) (Zimbabwe)	Heinz Günthardt / Jakob Hlasek; Haroon Ismail / Philip Tuckniss	6; 1	6; 1	6; 1
4	(Switzerland) (Zimbabwe)	Jakob Hlasek; Haroon Ismail	6; 3	6; 3	6; 4
5	(Switzerland) (Zimbabwe)	Roland Stadler; Philip Tuckniss	6; 2	6; 0	6; 1

==== Great Britain vs. Portugal ====
Great Britain
5
Nottingham Lawn Tennis Club, Nottingham, United Kingdom
14–16 June 1985
Grass

Portugal
0

			1	2	3	4	5
1	(United Kingdom) (Portugal)	Steve Shaw; João Cunha e Silva	6; 3	6; 1	6; 1
2	(United Kingdom) (Portugal)	Jeremy Bates; Pedro Cordeiro	6; 4	6; 2	6; 0
3	(United Kingdom) (Portugal)	Jeremy Bates / Steve Shaw; Pedro Cordeiro / João Cunha e Silva	6; 3	6; 4	6; 2
4	(United Kingdom) (Portugal)	Steve Shaw; Pedro Cordeiro	6; 4	8; 6
5	(United Kingdom) (Portugal)	Jeremy Bates; João Cunha e Silva	6; 4	6; 4

=== Semifinals ===
==== Austria vs. Israel ====
Austria
2
TSV Hartberg Tennis, Hartberg, Austria
2–4 August 1985
Clay

Israel
3

			1	2	3	4	5
1	(Austria) (Israel)	Thomas Muster; Amos Mansdorf	7; 5	1; 6	6; 3	6; 0
2	(Austria) (Israel)	Bernhard Pils; Shlomo Glickstein	8; 6	4; 6	6; 4	4; 6	1; 6
3	(Austria) (Israel)	Alex Antonitsch / Peter Feigl; Shlomo Glickstein / Shahar Perkiss	5; 7	5; 7	6; 8
4	(Austria) (Israel)	Bernhard Pils; Amos Mansdorf	6; 2	5; 7	1; 6	2; 6
5	(Austria) (Israel)	Thomas Muster; Shlomo Glickstein	3; 6	10; 8	6; 2

==== Great Britain vs. Switzerland ====
Great Britain
3
Devonshire Park Lawn Tennis Club, Eastbourne, United Kingdom
2–4 August 1985
Grass

Switzerland
0

			1	2	3	4	5
1	(United Kingdom) (Switzerland)	John Lloyd; Jakob Hlasek	5; 7	2; 6	6; 4	7; 5	7; 5
2	(United Kingdom) (Switzerland)	Jeremy Bates; Heinz Günthardt	6; 0	6; 3	2; 6	6; 1
3	(United Kingdom) (Switzerland)	Colin Dowdeswell` / John Lloyd; Heinz Günthardt / Jakob Hlasek	7; 5	3; 6	4; 6	6; 3	6; 2
4	(United Kingdom) (Switzerland)	John Lloyd; Heinz Günthardt						not played
5	(United Kingdom) (Switzerland)	Jeremy Bates; Jakob Hlasek						not played

=== Final ===
==== Great Britain vs. Israel ====
Great Britain
4
Devonshire Park Lawn Tennis Club, Eastbourne, United Kingdom
4–6 October 1985
Grass

Israel
1

			1	2	3	4	5
1	(United Kingdom) (Israel)	Jeremy Bates; Shlomo Glickstein	7; 9	6; 3	5; 7	6; 3	3; 6
2	(United Kingdom) (Israel)	John Lloyd; Amos Mansdorf	14; 12	6; 3	4; 6	6; 3
3	(United Kingdom) (Israel)	Colin Dowdeswell / John Lloyd; Shlomo Glickstein / Shahar Perkiss	6; 4	3; 6	7; 5	2; 6	6; 3
4	(United Kingdom) (Israel)	John Lloyd; Shlomo Glickstein	6; 1	6; 1	3; 6	6; 3
5	(United Kingdom) (Israel)	Jeremy Bates; Amos Mansdorf	6; 2	1; 6	6; 3
