= 1983 Davis Cup =

1983 edition of the Davis Cup

Details
- Duration: 4 March – 28 December 1983
- Edition: 72nd
- Teams: 58

Champion
- Winning nation: Australia

The 1983 Davis Cup (also known as the 1983 Davis Cup by NEC for sponsorship purposes) was the 72nd edition of the Davis Cup, the most important tournament between national teams in men's tennis. 60 teams would enter the competition, 16 in the World Group, 25 in the Europe Zone, 10 in the Eastern Zone, and 9 in the Americas Zone.

Australia defeated Sweden in the final, held at the Kooyong Stadium in Melbourne, Australia, on 26–28 December, to win their 25th title overall.

== World Group ==
Participating teams
Argentina	Australia	Chile	Czechoslovakia
Denmark	France	Great Britain	Indonesia
Ireland	Italy	New Zealand	Paraguay
Romania	Soviet Union	Sweden	United States

=== Draw ===
First round 4–6 March
Moscow, Soviet Union (indoor carpet)
France	4
Soviet Union	1
Asunción, Paraguay (indoor carpet)
Czechoslovakia	2
Paraguay	3
Adelaide, Australia (grass)
Australia	4
Great Britain	1
Timișoara, Romania (indoor hard)
Chile	0
Romania	5
Bjärred, Sweden (indoor carpet)
Indonesia	0
Sweden	5
Christchurch, New Zealand (grass)
Denmark	0
New Zealand	5
Reggio Calabria, Italy (clay)
Ireland	2
Italy	3
Buenos Aires, Argentina (clay)
Argentina	3
United States	2

Quarterfinals; 8–10 July
Marseille, France (clay)
France	3
Paraguay	2
Brisbane, Australia (grass)
Australia	5
Romania	0
Eastbourne, United Kingdom (grass)
Sweden	3
New Zealand	2
Rome, Italy (clay)
Italy	0
Argentina	5

Semifinals; 30 September–2 October
Sydney, Australia (grass)
France	1
Australia	4
Stockholm, Sweden (indoor carpet)
Sweden	4
Argentina	1

Final; 26–28 December
Melbourne, Australia (grass)
Australia	3
Sweden	2

=== Final ===
Australia vs. Sweden

Australia
3
Kooyong Stadium, Melbourne, Australia
26–28 December 1983
Grass

Sweden
2

			1	2	3	4	5
1	(Australia) (Sweden)	Pat Cash; Mats Wilander	3; 6	6; 4	7; 9	3; 6
2	(Australia) (Sweden)	John Fitzgerald; Joakim Nyström	6; 4	6; 2	4; 6	6; 4
3	(Australia) (Sweden)	Mark Edmondson / Paul McNamee; Anders Järryd / Hans Simonsson	6; 4	6; 4	6; 2
4	(Australia) (Sweden)	Pat Cash; Joakim Nyström	6; 4	6; 1	6; 1
5	(Australia) (Sweden)	John Fitzgerald; Mats Wilander	8; 6	1; 6	0; 6

=== Relegation play-offs ===
Date: 30 September–2 October

Home team	Score	Visiting team	Location	Door	Surface
Czechoslovakia	4–1	Soviet Union	Hradec Králové	Indoor	Clay
Great Britain	4–1	Chile	Eastbourne	Outdoor	Grass
Denmark	4–1	Indonesia	Copenhagen	Indoor	Carpet
Ireland	1–4	United States	Dublin	Indoor	Carpet

- Czechoslovakia, Denmark, Great Britain and United States remain in the World Group in 1984.
- Chile, Indonesia, Ireland and Soviet Union are relegated to Zonal competition in 1984.

== Americas Zone ==
First round 14–16 January
Mexico
bye
bye
Uruguay
Colombia
bye
Lima, Peru (clay)
Brazil	4
Peru	1
Caribbean/West Indies
bye
bye
Ecuador
Venezuela
bye
bye
Canada

Quarterfinals; 4–6 March
Montevideo, Uruguay (clay)
Mexico	1
Uruguay	4
Bogotá, Colombia (indoor clay)
Colombia	0
Brazil	5
Guayaquil, Ecuador (clay)
Caribbean/West Indies	0
Ecuador	5
Laval, Canada (indoor hard)
Venezuela	2
Canada	3

Semifinals; 6–8 May
Montevideo, Uruguay (clay)
Uruguay	2
Brazil	3
Guayaquil, Ecuador (clay)
Ecuador	4
Canada	1

Final; 30 September–2 October
Guayaquil, Ecuador (clay)
Brazil	0
Ecuador	5

- Ecuador are promoted to the World Group in 1984.

== Eastern Zone ==
First round 14–16 January
India
bye
Colombo, Sri Lanka (clay)
Sri Lanka	3
Hong Kong	2
Thailand
bye
bye
Chinese Taipei
Manila, Philippines (indoor clay)
Philippines	5
Malaysia	0
bye
South Korea
China
bye
bye
Japan

Quarterfinals; 4–6 March
Colombo, Sri Lanka (clay)
India	4
Sri Lanka	1
Taipei, Taiwan (indoor hard)
Thailand	3
Chinese Taipei	2
Seoul, South Korea (clay)
Philippines	1
South Korea	4
Osaka, Japan (hard)
China	2
Japan	3

Semifinals; 6–8 May
New Delhi, India (grass)
India	5
Thailand	0
Nagoya, Japan (hard)
South Korea	1
Japan	4

Final; 30 September–2 October
Tokyo, Japan (hard)
India	3
Japan	2

- India are promoted to the World Group in 1984.

== Europe Zone ==
=== Zone A ===
First round 6–8 May
West Germany
bye
Warsaw, Poland (clay)
Poland	0
Belgium	5
Israel
bye
Monte Carlo, Monaco (clay)
Luxembourg	1
Monaco	4
Estoril, Portugal (clay)
Portugal	1
Netherlands	4
bye
Egypt
Iraq
Greece	w/o
bye
Switzerland

Quarterfinals; 10–12 June
Eupen, Belgium (clay)
West Germany	5
Belgium	0
Monte Carlo, Monaco (clay)
Israel	4
Monaco	1
Cairo, Egypt (clay)
Netherlands	4
Egypt	1
Ostermundigen, Switzerland (clay)
Greece	0
Switzerland	5

Semifinals; 8–10 July
Ramat HaSharon, Israel (hard)
West Germany	3
Israel	2
Lugano, Switzerland (clay)
Netherlands	1
Switzerland	3

Final; 30 September–2 October
Freiburg, West Germany (clay)
West Germany	3
Switzerland	2

- West Germany are promoted to the World Group in 1984.

=== Zone B ===
First round 4–8 May
Hungary
bye
Istanbul, Turkey (clay)
Zimbabwe	5
Turkey	0
Ternitz, Austria (indoor hard)
Austria	5
Morocco	0
Norway	w/o
Libya
Algiers, Algeria (clay)
Algeria	1
Bulgaria	4
bye
Finland
Zagreb, Yugoslavia (clay)
Tunisia	0
Yugoslavia	3
bye
Spain

Quarterfinals; 10–12 June
Budapest, Hungary (clay)
Hungary	4
Zimbabwe	1
Oslo, Norway (clay)
Austria	4
Norway	1
Sofia, Bulgaria (clay)
Bulgaria	3
Finland	2
Madrid, Spain (clay)
Yugoslavia	3
Spain	2

Semifinals; 8–10 July
Pörtschach, Austria (clay)
Hungary	3
Austria	2
Sofia, Bulgaria (clay)
Bulgaria	0
Yugoslavia	5

Final; 30 September–2 October
Zagreb, Yugoslavia (clay)
Hungary	0
Yugoslavia	4

- Yugoslavia are promoted to the World Group in 1984.
