= Switzerland Davis Cup team =

Davis Cup team representing Switzerland

Switzerland
- Captain: Severin Lüthi
- Nations Ranking: 44 (20 September 2021)
- Highest ranking: 2 (24 November 2014)
- Colors: Red & white
- First year: 1923
- Years played: 85
- Ties played (W–L): 160 (76–84)
- Years in World Group: 23 (13–22)
- Davis Cup titles: 1 (2014)
- Runners-up: 1 (1992)
- Most total wins: Roger Federer (52–18)
- Most singles wins: Roger Federer (40–8)
- Most doubles wins: Jakob Hlasek (15–10)
- Best doubles team: Jakob Hlasek/ Marc Rosset (7–5); Markus Günthardt/ Heinz Günthardt (7–5)
- Most ties played: Heinz Günthardt (30)
- Most years played: Heinz Günthardt; Roger Federer (15)

The Switzerland men's national tennis team represents Switzerland in the Davis Cup tennis competition and is governed by Swiss Tennis.

In 2007, Switzerland competed in the World Group for the 13th consecutive year – the third longest ongoing streak – before being relegated after losing 3–2 against the Czech Republic.

Switzerland, with 20-time Grand Slam champion Roger Federer and three-time Grand Slam champion and then-reigning Australian Open champion Stan Wawrinka on the team, won its first Davis Cup title in 2014.

== Current team (2024) ==
- Stan Wawrinka (singles)
- Dominic Stricker (singles)
- Leandro Riedi (singles)
- Alexander Ritschard (singles)
- Marc-Andrea Hüsler (singles)
- Luca Margaroli (doubles)

== History ==
Switzerland competed in its first Davis Cup in the 1923. They won the Davis Cup title for the first time in 2014, defeating France in the final by three rubbers to one, Roger Federer's victory over Richard Gasquet in the first reverse singles rubber clinching the title for the Swiss.

Switzerland has reached one other final, losing to the USA in 1992, as well as being semifinalists in 2003, and quarterfinalists in 1998, 1999, 2001 and 2004.

== Captains ==
- Roland Stadler (1991–1992)
- Tim Sturdza (1992–1993)
- Stephane Oberer (1994–1998)
- Claudio Mezzadri (1999)
- Jakob Hlasek (2000–2001)
- Ivo Heuberger (2002)
- Marc Rosset (2002–2005, as playing captain 2002–2003)
- Severin Lüthi (2005–present)

== 1992 campaign ==
Tennis became extremely popular in Switzerland in 1992. First, Marc Rosset and Jakob Hlasek won the 1992 French Open title in doubles. Marc Rosset went on to win the Olympics singles title in Barcelona. The Davis Cup campaign completed this exceptional year for Swiss tennis. The team was led by Marc Rosset and Jakob Hlasek and completed by Claudio Mezzadri and Thierry Grin. It lost the final 3-1 to a tough United States team consisting of Andre Agassi, Jim Courier, Pete Sampras, and John McEnroe.

After a comfortable 4-1 win against the Netherlands in The Hague, Switzerland traveled to the Arena of Nîmes to play France on clay in the quarterfinals. The Roman amphitheater was semi-covered for this event. Switzerland won 3-2 and recorded its first victory against a French team when Jakob Hlasek scored the decisive point against French clay-court specialist Thierry Champion.

The semifinal against Brazil (won 5-0) in the Geneva Palexpo established a new world record for the largest attendance at an indoor tennis event at that time (15,000 people). The tie was played on an extremely fast Taraflex court, which favoured the fast serving Marc Rosset against Brazilian players traditionally used to play on much slower clay courts. Brazil had shocked Germany and Italy in the previous rounds, both played in Brazil. The Swiss team was mostly concerned about Jaime Oncins, who was featuring a 9-0 record in Davis Cup before the semifinal. Oncins had also reached the quarterfinals of the Olympics a few months earlier. Oncins did not win a single set in Geneva. The tie was decided after the doubles rubber with a straight-set win by Hlasek and Rosset against the experienced pair of Fernando Roese and Cássio Motta.

Switzerland
5
Palexpo, Geneva, Switzerland
25–27 September 1992
Hard (i)

Brazil
0

			1	2	3	4	5
1	(Switzerland) (Brazil)	Marc Rosset; Jaime Oncins	6; 3	7; 5	7; 5
2	(Switzerland) (Brazil)	Jakob Hlasek; Luiz Mattar	6; 2	6; 3	6^{5} 7^{7}	6; 3
3	(Switzerland) (Brazil)	Marc Rosset / Jakob Hlasek; Cássio Motta / Fernando Roese	6; 3	6; 4	6; 3
4	(Switzerland) (Brazil)	Jakob Hlasek; Jaime Oncins	6; 4	6; 2
5	(Switzerland) (Brazil)	Marc Rosset; Luiz Mattar	7^{7} 6^{2}	6; 3

The final was played in Fort Worth, Texas. Switzerland fired their captain Roland Stadler after the semifinals for reasons which remain unclear. He was replaced by former player and multiple Swiss champion Tim Sturdza. Andre Agassi put the United States 1-0 ahead with a very clear win over Jakob Hlasek in which Hlasek only won a total of five games in three sets. Marc Rosset levelled the game with a hard-fought win over Jim Courier, whom he had beaten in the Olympics the same year. The doubles proved to be the turning point of the tie. After the Swiss won the two first sets 7-6, John McEnroe managed to fire up Pete Sampras, who had been hardly there during the two first sets. The United States won the third set 7-5, and then took the two remaining sets easily. On Sunday, Courier secured the title for the United States with a four-set win against Hlasek.

United States
3
Tarrant County Center, Fort Worth, United States
4–6 December 1992
Hard (i)

Switzerland
1

			1	2	3	4	5
1	(United States) (Switzerland)	Andre Agassi; Jakob Hlasek	6; 1	6; 2	6; 2
2	(United States) (Switzerland)	Jim Courier; Marc Rosset	3; 6	7^{11} 6^{9}	6; 3	4; 6	4; 6
3	(United States) (Switzerland)	John McEnroe / Pete Sampras; Jakob Hlasek / Marc Rosset	6^{5} 7^{7}	6^{8} 7^{10}	7; 5	6; 1	6; 2
4	(United States) (Switzerland)	Jim Courier; Jakob Hlasek	6; 3	3; 6	6; 3	6; 4
5	(United States) (Switzerland)	Andre Agassi; Marc Rosset						not played

The fifth rubber between Andre Agassi and Marc Rosset was not played. Annoyed by Agassi's behaviour during the tie (especially some alleged verbal aggression against Hlasek), Rosset later stated that he was ready to "explode Agassi" in the fifth rubber and that this would have been the kind of game that would have excited him a lot. One year later, Rosset faced Agassi in Indian Wells and beat him.

== 2003 campaign ==
The Swiss team in 2003 had the particularity to have a playing captain in the person of 1992 Olympic champion and Davis Cup finalist Marc Rosset, who partnered Federer in the doubles against France (QF) and Australia (SF). The 2003 team further included Michel Kratochvil and George Bastl. The team had to play its three matches away from home.

After a very tight first round in Arnhem, Netherlands (Michel Kratochvil won the decisive rubber against Martin Verkerk). Switzerland recorded a convincing win against France in Toulouse during which Rosset and Federer showed their strength as a doubles team, and Federer outplayed Fabrice Santoro in the fourth rubber.

For the semifinal, Switzerland had to travel to the Rod Laver Arena in Melbourne to face Australia with Lleyton Hewitt, Mark Philippoussis, and doubles specialists Todd Woodbridge and Arthurs. After the expected wins of Hewitt against Kratochvil and Federer against Phlippoussis, the doubles appeared to be the turning point, very much like in the 1992 final. Federer and Rosset lost in five sets, and Federer then had to play Hewitt for survival. After Federer won the first two sets 7-5 and 6-2, Hewitt fought back and won the next three sets. This is still considered one of Federer's most painful defeats, and he was still in tears many hours after the game.

Australia
3
Rod Laver Arena, Melbourne, Australia
19–21 September 2003
Hard

Switzerland
2

			1	2	3	4	5
1	(Australia) (Switzerland)	Lleyton Hewitt; Michel Kratochvil	6; 4	6; 4	6; 1
2	(Australia) (Switzerland)	Mark Philippoussis; Roger Federer	3; 6	4; 6	6^{3} 7^{7}
3	(Australia) (Switzerland)	Wayne Arthurs / Todd Woodbridge; Roger Federer / Marc Rosset	4; 6	7^{7} 6^{5}	5; 7	6; 4	6; 4
4	(Australia) (Switzerland)	Lleyton Hewitt; Roger Federer	5; 7	2; 6	7^{7} 6^{4}	7; 5	6; 1
5	(Australia) (Switzerland)	Todd Woodbridge; Michel Kratochvil	4; 6					retired

For the final, Switzerland would have faced Spain in the Bern Arena, which was already booked to receive the event.

== 2014 campaign and victory ==
After its failure of 2003, Switzerland did not reach a semifinal until 2014. The team's prospects rose considerably when Roger Federer declared himself available for the first round of the World Group against Serbia, which was without its best players: Novak Djokovic (exhausted after the Australian Open), Janko Tipsarević (injured), and Victor Troicki (suspended). Also, the Swiss team for the first time included two Grand Slam champions, as Stan Wawrinka had won the Australian Open.

The draw for the World Group looked favourable for the Swiss, with a quarterfinal against Kazakhstan or Belgium and possibly a semifinal against Italy (led by Fabio Fognini) or Great Britain (led by Andy Murray).

Switzerland won the first round against a Serbian "B-Team" 3-2 in Novi Sad. The game was decided 3-0 after Chiudinelli and Lammer made the winning point in the doubles.

For the quarterfinal, Switzerland faced Kazakhstan in Geneva. A poor performance by Wawrinka (lost his first singles and the doubles) almost caused the elimination of the Swiss team, so Federer played a deciding fifth rubber (after Wawrinka had regained his form to win the fourth rubber) against Golubev, which he won. With this victory, Federer succeeded Jakob Hlasek as the Swiss player with most singles wins (35).

For the semifinal against Italy, a record attendance for a Swiss tennis game was set with 18,400 spectators in the Geneva Palexpo. Tickets sold out in less than three hours. Captains Severin Lüthi and Corrado Barazzutti called the following players:

Switzerland: Roger Federer (ATP 3), Stan Wawrinka (ATP 4), Marco Chiudinelli (ATP 161), Michael Lammer (ATP 497).

Italy: Fabio Fognini (ATP 17), Andreas Seppi (ATP 48), Simone Bolelli (ATP 76), Paolo Lorenzi (ATP 78).

For the Swiss team, Yann Marti (ATP 209) was called as a fifth player, acting as a sparring partner. He was allowed to wear the team uniform for the first time and to stay with the team the whole week.

Both Federer and Wawrinka won their singles matches in straight sets and were first expected to play together in the doubles on Saturday. However, due to his fatigue after the US Open, Federer asked not to play in order to be fresh in case he needed to play on Sunday. Wawrinka played the doubles with Chiudinelli, and they lost in five sets to Fognini and Bolelli. This was the third defeat of the Wawrinka and Chiudinelli in three Davis Cup matches. They had already lost together against Italy in 2009.

For the decisive rubber on Sunday, Roger Federer faced Fognini and won in straight sets, qualifying Switzerland for its second final.

Switzerland
3
Palexpo, Geneva, Switzerland
12–14 September 2014
Hard (i)

Italy
2

			1	2	3	4	5
1	(Switzerland) (Italy)	Roger Federer; Simone Bolelli	7^{7} 6^{5}	6; 4	6; 4
2	(Switzerland) (Italy)	Stan Wawrinka; Fabio Fognini	6; 2	6; 3	6; 2
3	(Switzerland) (Italy)	Stan Wawrinka / Marco Chiudinelli; Simone Bolelli / Fabio Fognini	5; 7	6; 3	7; 5	3; 6	2; 6
4	(Switzerland) (Italy)	Roger Federer; Fabio Fognini	6; 2	6; 3	7^{7} 6^{5}
5	(Switzerland) (Italy)	Michael Lammer; Andreas Seppi	4; 6	6; 1	4; 6

For the final against France, the Swiss team traveled to Villeneuve-d'Ascq, near Lille. The local football stadium, the Stade Pierre-Mauroy was transformed into a tennis stadium for the occasion, with a capacity of 30,000. The French decided to play on a clay court. This choice was mostly due to the fact that both Federer and Wawrinka were participating in the ATP World Tour Finals on a hard court a week before the Davis Cup final. However, French captain Arnaud Clément stated that the surface would not necessarily be an advantage for France. France started practicing on the court 10 days before the final, while Federer and Wawrinka were playing in London on a hard court.

Initially, the French team also evoked the possibility of organizing the final in one of their Overseas Territories to impose jet lag on Federer and Wawrinka, both playing the ATP World Tour Finals in London one week before the Davis Cup final. Gilles Simon mentioned the city of Nouméa in New Caledonia as a potential venue.

The previous memorable campaigns of 1992 and 2003 also saw the Swiss team play away ties against France. On both occasions, Switzerland won 3–2 in the quarter-finals (1992: QF won 3-2 in Nîmes; 2003: QF won 3-2 in Toulouse). These remain the only two Swiss victories in 12 Davis Cup meetings with France.

The preparation of the Swiss team for the final was overshadowed by the back injury of Federer. He was playing at the ATP Finals in London the week before and won the semifinal in a very tight match against Wawrinka, during which he injured his back. He subsequently withdrew from the final against Novak Djokovic, and he was unable to practice until the late evening of Wednesday before the final. This left Federer with very limited practice time for the transition from hard court (on which he played in Paris and London) to the clay court in Villeneuve-d'Ascq. The French team had no injury to report and prepared during 10 days on clay before the final.

The captains nominated the following players:

France: Jo-Wilfried Tsonga (ATP 12), Gaël Monfils (ATP 19), Julien Benneteau (ATP 25), Richard Gasquet (ATP 26).

Switzerland: Roger Federer (ATP 2), Stan Wawrinka (ATP 4), Marco Chiudinelli (ATP 212), Michael Lammer (ATP 508).

Federer's injury triggered discussions about the possible late nomination of a substitute. Yann Marti (ATP 227) was considered as a replacement, clay being his favourite type of surface. However, Federer's health improved, and no further nomination was made.

Despite a good end of season (runner-up in the ATP 1000 Shanghai), Gilles Simon, who had a better ranking than Benneteau and Gasquet (ATP 21), was left out of the French team. This was probably due to his bad previous results in Davis Cup and his inability to win decisive games in this competition.

With Federer's fourth-round victory over Gasquet in the reverse singles rubber, Switzerland secured its first Davis Cup trophy.

France
1
Stade Pierre-Mauroy, Lille, France
21–23 November 2014
Clay (i)

Switzerland
3

			1	2	3	4	5
1	(France) (Switzerland)	Jo-Wilfried Tsonga; Stan Wawrinka	1; 6	6; 3	3; 6	2; 6
2	(France) (Switzerland)	Gaël Monfils; Roger Federer	6; 1	6; 4	6; 3
3	(France) (Switzerland)	Julien Benneteau / Richard Gasquet; Roger Federer / Stan Wawrinka	3; 6	5; 7	4; 6
4	(France) (Switzerland)	Richard Gasquet; Roger Federer	4; 6	2; 6	2; 6
5	(France) (Switzerland)	Gaël Monfils; Stan Wawrinka						not played

== From 2015 until 2018 relegation ==
After winning the Davis Cup for the first time, titleholder Switzerland travelled to Belgium for the first round. Both Federer and Wawrinka announced that they would not play. Therefore, captain Severin Lüthi called the following players:

Yann Marti (ATP no. 294), Adrien Bossel (ATP no. 324), Henri Laaksonen (ATP no. 344) and Michael Lammer (ATP no. 541). Marco Chiudinelli (ATP no. 226) was still recovering from an injury and was not called.

This was the first selection for both Marti and Bossel.

The tie was overshadowed by the decision of Yann Marti to leave the team after the captain had decided not to nominate him for the Friday singles. Marti left the team on Friday with only three players available for the tie. Switzerland lost the tie 3-2 (despite Henri Laaksonen's winning both his singles), and Marti was heavily criticized in Switzerland. The president of Swiss Tennis even stated that he would never tolerate Marti's presence on the team again and that he would prefer to play in the continental zone with serious people, than in the World Group with Marti.

Michael Lammer announced his retirement after the Belgium tie.

The Swiss team secured its spot in the World Group by winning the play-off game against the Netherlands 4-1 in Geneva. Both Roger Federer and Stan Wawrinka played the tie. They both needed to play one Davis Cup tie during the year in order to guarantee a spot in the 2016 Olympics in Rio de Janeiro.

In 2016, Switzerland faced Italy abroad for the first round, without Federer and Wawrinka. The captain called Laaksonen, Chiudinelli, Bossel and a newcomer from Geneva, Antoine Bellier. Switzerland lost 5-0. Chiudinelli and Wawrinka were not called for the play-off in Uzbekistan, while Federer was taking a long break to recover from a knee injury, so that Switzerland had to play again with a B team, led by Laaksonen and Bellier. The tie was played on a clay court in Tashkent. Switzerland won 3-2 and confirmed its spot in the World Group.

In 2017, The Swiss B team (Laaksonen, Chiudinelli, Bellier, Bossel) lost the first round 5-0 to the United States in Alabama. It was the second 5-0 in a row for the US team against Switzerland, after they had won 5-0 against a team with Federer and Wawrinka in Fribourg in 2012. Switzerland maintained its spot in the World Group with a 3-2 win on home soil. Chiudinelli won both singles including the decisive fifth game. This was also his last game for the Swiss Davis Cup Team and he retired from professional tennis a few months later.

In 2018, Switzerland got relegated for the first time after 2010. First with a loss to Kazakhstan abroad and to Sweden 3-2 at home.

== 2018-2023: Life outside of the elite ==
The Davis Cup format changed as of 2019 and Switzerland was allowed to play a qualifying round to try to access the new Davis Cup finals format. Switzerland lost against Russia at home and was confirmed as a relegated nation to Europa zone. On this occasion, team leader Laaksonen lost both his singles. Switzerland then competed in the Europe zone group I and lost abroad against Slovakia (3-1) after team leader Laaksonen again lost his two singles and the doubles, without showing any signs of rebellion.

For the 2020 edition, Switzerland faced Peru at the Club Lawn Tennis de la Exposicíon in Lima in a qualifying round to stay in what would now be called World Group I, one level below the teams allowed to compete for the title of world champion. This was the first tie ever between the two nations. Switzerland played with Laaksonen, Ehrat, Nikles, Bellier and Margaroli. Switzerland lost 3x1, with team leader Henri Laaksonen losing once again his decisive rubber against a low-ranked player with a demotivated attitude, causing Switzerland’s relegation to Group II, the third level of world’s tennis.

Serious questions remain about the financial support received by this player from the Swiss federation, despite the absence of any results over years and the fact that his nominations on the team prevent younger players (Bellier, Nikles) from getting a real chance to express their qualities on the court.

In 2021, the Swiss team led by Stricker and Laaksonen beat Estonia 5-0 in Biel in the World Group II.

In 2022, Switzerland hosted Lebanon for the World Group I and won 3-1, qualifying for a World Group I final game in Ecuador, which they won 3-2 thanks to victories from Stricker, Hüsler and Ritschard in the decisive rubber. This victory earned the Swiss team a spot against Germany in the Qualifiers for the 2023 Finals opening a path back to the elite of world team tennis.

== 2023: Qualification for the Finals, then disappearance from the Elite ==
For the 2023 Qualifiers against Switzerland, Germany fielded Alexander Zverev (WR 14) and Wawrinka made his comeback for Switzerland on that occasion after a long absence. He eventually won the decisive rubber against Daniel Altmaier, securing Switzerland a 3-2 victory and a spot in the 2023 Finals. The other match hero was Marc-Andrea Hüsler who won against Zverev. This was the first time the Swiss team won against Germany in Davis Cup.

After years of absence, Switzerland came back to the elite of world tennis and participated in the 2023 Finals with Wawrinka and Stricker leading the team in singles. They faced long-time Davis Cup rival France, Great Britain and Australia in the Qualifiers held in Manchester.

The overall result was disappointing. Switzerland lost all ties (0-3, 1-2, 0-3) scoring only one point (Wawrinka vs Norrie). The doubles team - a traditional strength of the Swiss team during its victorious campaigns - failed completely and lost its three games without winning a single set.

Switzerland has remained outside of the elite top 16 nations since then, losing qualification games against the Netherlands (2024), Spain, India (2025) and Brazil (2026).

== Home venues since 1992 ==
The memorable semifinal of 1992 marked the beginning of a love story between the Swiss team and the Palexpo in Geneva. It is by far the most frequently used venue for home ties and can be considered the Swiss temple of tennis. Notably, the Palexpo also staged the Laver Cup in 2019, with the participation of Federer.

1. Geneva, Palexpo: 10 ties (1992, 1995, 1996, 2005, 2006, 2007, 2013, 2014 (QF and SF), 2015)

2. Biel, Swiss Tennis Arena: 9 ties (2017, 2018, 2019, 2021, 2022, 2024, 2025 (2x), 2026.

3. Neuchâtel, Patinoires du Littoral: 3 ties (1999, 2001, 2013)

4. Fribourg, Forum: 2 ties (2005, 2012)

5. Lausanne, Patinoire de Malley: 2 ties (2004, 2008)

6. Zurich, Saalsporthalle: 2 ties (1998, 1999)

7. Bern, PostFinance Arena (2011), Kreuzlingen (2008), Geneva, Arena (2006), Basel, St. Jakobshalle (2001), St. Gallen, Kreuzbleichhalle (2000), Locarno, FEVI (1997), Olten, Stadthalle (1996): 1 tie

== Results ==
=== 1980–1989 ===
Year	Competition	Date	Location	Opponent	Score	Result
1980	Europe Zone, Qualifiers first round	8–10 Feb	(Switzerland) Winterthur	Israel	4–1	Won
1980	Europe Zone, Quarterfinals	7–9 Mar	(Switzerland) Zürich	Hungary	3–2	Won
1980	Europe Zone, Semifinals	13–15 Jun	(Italy) Turin	Italy	0–5	Lost
1981	World Group, First Round	6–8 Mar	(Switzerland) Zürich	Czechoslovakia	2–3	Lost
1981	Relegation play-offs	2–4 Oct	(Mexico) Tijuana	Mexico	2–3	Lost
1982	Europe Zone, Quarterfinals	11–13 Jun	(Morocco) Casablanca	Morocco	5–0	Won
1982	Europe Zone, Semifinals	6–8 Aug	(Austria) Pörtschach	Austria	4–0	Won
1982	Europe Zone, Final	1–3 Oct	(Republic of Ireland) Dublin	Ireland	1–4	Lost
1983	Europe Zone, Quarterfinals	10–12 Jun	(Switzerland) Ostermundigen	Greece	5–0	Won
1983	Europe Zone, Semifinals	8–10 Jul	(Switzerland) Lugano	Netherlands	3–1	Won
1983	Europe Zone, Final	30 Sep–2 Oct	(West Germany) Freiburg	West Germany	2–3	Lost
1984	Europe Zone, Quarterfinals	15–17 Jun	(Switzerland) Disentis	Senegal	5–0	Won
1984	Europe Zone, Semifinals	19–21 Jul	(Israel) Ramat HaSharon	Israel	1–4	Lost
1985	Europe Zone, First Round	10–12 May	(Tunisia) Tunis	Tunisia	5–0	Won
1985	Europe Zone, Quarterfinals	14–16 Jun	(Switzerland) Weggis	Zimbabwe	5–0	Won
1985	Europe Zone, Quarterfinals	2–4 Aug	(United Kingdom) Eastbourne	Great Britain	0–3	Lost
1986	Europe Zone, Quarterfinals	13–15 Jun	(Switzerland) Lucerne	Greece	5–0	Won
1986	Europe Zone, Semifinals	18–20 Jul	(Hungary) Budapest	Hungary	3–2	Won
1986	Europe Zone, Final	3–5 Oct	(Switzerland) St. Gallen	Israel	1–4	Lost
1987	Europe Zone, Quarterfinals	12–14 Jun	(Switzerland) Lugano	Belgium	5–0	Won
1987	Europe Zone, Semifinals	24–26 Jul	(Bulgaria) Haskovo	Bulgaria	5–0	Won
1987	Europe Zone, Final	2–4 Oct	(Soviet Union) Donetsk	Soviet Union	3–2	Won
1988	World Group, First round	5–7 Feb	(Switzerland) Basel	France	1–4	Lost
1988	Relegation play-offs	8–10 Apr	(Switzerland) St. Gallen	Mexico	2–3	Lost
1989	Europe/Africa Zone Group I	5–7 May	(Switzerland) Liestal	Romania	4–1	Won
1989	World Group qualifying round	21–23 Jul	(Switzerland) Langenthal	Paraguay	5–0	Won

=== 1990–1999 ===
Year	Competition	Date	Location	Opponent	Score	Result
1990	World Group, First Round	2–4 Feb	(Czechoslovakia) Prague	Czechoslovakia	0–5	Lost
1990	World Group, Play-offs	21–23 Sep	(Socialist Federal Republic of Yugoslavia) Split	Yugoslavia	2–3	Lost
1991	Europe/Africa Group, Semifinals	3–5 May	(Switzerland) Davos	Soviet Union	3–2	Won
1991	World Group, Play-offs	20–22 Sep	(Switzerland) Baden	New Zealand	5–0	Won
1992	World Group, First Round	31 Jan–2 Feb	(Netherlands) The Hague	Netherlands	4–1	Won
1992	World Group, Quarterfinals	27–29 Mar	(France) Nîmes	France	3–2	Won
1992	World Group, Semifinals	25–27 Sep	(Switzerland) Geneva	Brazil	5–0	Won
1992	World Group, Final	4–6 Dec	(United States) Fort Worth	United States	1–3	Lost
1993	World Group, First Round	26–28 Mar	(India) Kolkata	India	2–3	Lost
1993	World Group, Play-offs	22–24 Sep	(Israel) Ramat HaSharon	Israel	2–3	Lost
1994	Europe/Africa Group, Semifinals	25–27 Mar	(Zimbabwe) Harare	Zimbabwe	3–2	Won
1994	World Group, Play-offs	23–25 Sep	(Indonesia) Jakarta	Indonesia	4–1	Won
1995	World Group, First Round	3–5 Feb	(Switzerland) Geneva	Netherlands	1–4	Lost
1995	World Group, Play-offs	22–24 Sep	(New Zealand) Hamilton	New Zealand	4–1	Won
1996	World Group, First Round	9–11 Feb	(Switzerland) Geneva	Germany	0–5	Lost
1996	World Group, Play-offs	20–22 Sep	(Switzerland) Olten	Morocco	5–0	Won
1997	World Group, First Round	7–9 Feb	(Sweden) Luleå	Sweden	1–4	Lost
1997	World Group, Play-offs	19–21 Sep	(Switzerland) Locarno	South Korea	3–2	Won
1998	World Group, First Round	3–5 Apr	(Switzerland) Zürich	Czech Republic	3–2	Won
1998	World Group, Quarterfinals	17–19 Jul	(Spain) A Coruña	Spain	1–4	Lost
1999	World Group, First Round	2–4 Apr	(Switzerland) Neuchâtel	Italy	3–2	Won
1999	World Group, Quarterfinals	16–18 Jul	(Belgium) Brussels	Belgium	2–3	Lost

=== 2000–2009 ===
Year	Competition	Date	Location	Opponent	Score	Result
2000	World Group, First Round	4–6 Feb	(Switzerland) Zürich	Australia	2–3	Lost
2000	World Group, Play-offs	21–23 Jul	(Switzerland) St. Gallen	Belarus	5–0	Won
2001	World Group, 1st Round	9–11 Feb	(Switzerland) Basel	United States	3–2	Won
2001	World Group, Quarterfinals	6–8 Apr	(Switzerland) Neuchâtel	France	2–3	Lost
2002	World Group, First Round	8–10 Feb	(Russia) Moscow	Russia	2–3	Lost
2002	World Group, Play-offs	20–22 Sep	(Morocco) Casablanca	Morocco	3–2	Won
2003	World Group, 1st Round	7–9 Feb	(Netherlands) Arnhem	Netherlands	3–2	Won
2003	World Group, Quarterfinals	4–6 Apr	(France) Toulouse	France	3–2	Won
2003	World Group, Semifinals	19–21 Sep	(Australia) Melbourne	Australia	2–3	Lost
2004	World Group, 1st Round	6–8 Feb	(Romania) Bucharest	Romania	3–2	Won
2004	World Group, Quarterfinals	9–11 Apr	(Switzerland) Prilly	France	2–3	Lost
2005	World Group, 1st Round	4–6 Mar	(Switzerland) Fribourg	Netherlands	2–3	Lost
2005	World Group, Play-offs	23–25 Sep	(Switzerland) Geneva	Great Britain	5–0	Won
2006	World Group, 1st Round	10–12 Feb	(Switzerland) Geneva	Australia	2–3	Lost
2006	World Group, Play-offs	22–24 Sep	(Switzerland) Geneva	Serbia and Montenegro	4–1	Won
2007	World Group, 1st Round	9–11 Feb	(Switzerland) Geneva	Spain	2–3	Lost
2007	World Group, Play-offs	21–23 Sep	(Czech Republic) Prague	Czech Republic	2–3	Lost
2008	Europe/Africa Group, First Round	8–10 Feb	(Switzerland) Kreuzlingen	Poland	4–1	Won
2008	Europe/Africa Group, Quarterfinals	11–13 Apr	(Belarus) Minsk	Belarus	4–1	Won
2008	World Group, Play-offs	19–21 Sep	(Switzerland) Lausanne	Belgium	4–1	Won
2009	World Group, 1st Round	6–8 Mar	(United States) Birmingham	United States	1–4	Lost
2009	World Group, Play-offs	18–20 Sep	(Italy) Genova	Italy	3–2	Won

=== 2010s ===
Year	Competition	Date	Location	Opponent	Score	Result
2010	World Group, First Round	5–7 Mar	(Spain) Logroño	Spain	1–4	Lost
2010	World Group, Play-offs	14–16 Sep	(Kazakhstan) Astana	Kazakhstan	0–5	Lost
2011	Europe/Africa Group, Quarterfinals	8–10 Jul	(Switzerland) Bern	Portugal	5–0	Won
2011	World Group, Play-offs	16–18 Sep	(Australia) Sydney	Australia	3–2	Won
2012	World Group, First Round	10–12 Feb	(Switzerland) Fribourg	United States	0–5	Lost
2012	World Group, Play-offs	14–16 Sep	(Netherlands) Amsterdam	Netherlands	3–2	Won
2013	World Group, First Round	1–3 Feb	(Switzerland) Geneva	Czech Republic	2–3	Lost
2013	World Group, Play-offs	13–15 Sep	(Switzerland) Neuchâtel	Ecuador	4–1	Won
2014	World Group, First Round	31 Jan–2 Feb	(Serbia) Novi Sad	Serbia	3–2	Won
2014	World Group, Quarterfinals	4–6 Apr	(Switzerland) Geneva	Kazakhstan	3–2	Won
2014	World Group, Semifinals	12–14 Sep	(Switzerland) Geneva	Italy	3–2	Won
2014	World Group, Final	21–23 Nov	(France) Lille	France	3–1	Champion
2015	World Group, First Round	6–8 Mar	(Belgium) Liège	Belgium	2–3	Lost
2015	World Group, Play-offs	18-20 Sep	(Switzerland) Geneva	Netherlands	4–1	Won
2016	World Group, First Round	4–6 Mar	(Italy) Pesaro	Italy	0–5	Lost
2016	World Group, Play-offs	16–18 Sep	(Uzbekistan) Tashkent	Uzbekistan	3–2	Won
2017	World Group, First Round	3–5 Feb	(United States) Birmingham	United States	0–5	Lost
2017	World Group, Play-offs	15–17 Sep	(Switzerland) Biel/Bienne	Belarus	3–2	Won
2018	World Group, First Round	2–4 Feb	(Kazakhstan) Astana	Kazakhstan	1–4	Lost
2018	World Group, Play-offs	14–16 Sep	(Switzerland) Biel/Bienne	Sweden	2–3	Lost
2019	Qualifying round	1–2 Feb	(Switzerland) Biel/Bienne	Russia	1–3	Lost
2019	Europe/Africa Zone Group I, 1st round	13–14 Sep	(Slovakia) Bratislava	Slovakia	1–3	Lost

=== 2020s ===
Year	Competition	Date	Location	Opponent	Score	Result
2020–21	World Group I play-offs	6–7 Mar 2020	(Peru) Lima	Peru	1–3	Lost
2020–21	World Group II	17–18 Sep 2021	(Switzerland) Biel/Bienne	Estonia	5–0	Won
2022	World Group I play-offs	4–5 Mar	(Switzerland) Biel/Bienne	Lebanon	3–1	Won
2022	World Group I	17–18 Sep	(Ecuador) Salinas	Ecuador	3–2	Won
2023	Qualifying round	3–4 Feb	(Germany) Trier	Germany	3–2	Won
2023	Finals – Groups stage	12 Sep	(United Kingdom) Manchester	France	0–3	Lost
2023	Finals – Groups stage	15 Sep	(United Kingdom) Manchester	Great Britain	1–2	Lost
2023	Finals – Groups stage	16 Sep	(United Kingdom) Manchester	Australia	0–3	Lost
2024	Qualifying round	2–3 Feb	(Netherlands) Groningen	Netherlands	2–3	Lost
2024	World Group I	13–14 Sep	(Switzerland) Biel/Bienne	Peru	5–0	Won
2025	Qualifiers first round	1–2 Feb	(Switzerland) Biel/Bienne	Spain	1–3	Lost

== Player records ==
Most total wins overall
#	Player	Years	Win–loss			Ties played	Years played
#	Player	Years	Singles	Doubles	Total	Ties played	Years played
1	Roger Federer	1999–2015	40–8	12–10	**52**–18	27	15
2	Jakob Hlasek	1982–1996	34–20	15–10	**49**–30	29	13
3	Marc Rosset	1990–2003	24–13	13–8	**37**–21	26	13
4	Heinz Günthardt	1976–1990	22–16	14–12	**36**–28	30	15
5	**Stan Wawrinka**	2004–2026	24–16	4–15	**28**–30	28	14
6	Charles Aeschlimann	1923–1934	15–17	9–9	**24**–26	19	11
7	Roland Stadler	1979–1988	20–18	3–0	**23**–18	22	10
8	Hector Fisher	1931–1939	19–10	3–8	**22**–18	15	8
9	Dimitri Sturdza	1964–1978	10–16	7–9	**17**–25	17	13
10	**Henri Laaksonen**	2013–2022	13–12	2–3	**15**–15	15	8

Active players in bold, statistics as of 11 September 2024.

== See also ==
- Davis Cup
- Switzerland Billie Jean King Cup team
- Switzerland at the Hopman Cup
