= 1983 Davis Cup World Group =

- Date: 4 March – 28 December
- Edition: 3rd

Champions
- Australia
- Davis Cup

The World Group was the highest level of Davis Cup competition in 1983.

The United States were the defending champions, but were eliminated in the first round.

Australia won the title, defeating Sweden in the final, 3–2. The final was held at the Kooyong Stadium in Melbourne, Australia, from 26 to 28 December. It was the Australian team's first Davis Cup title since 1977 and their 25th Davis Cup title overall.

== Participating teams ==
Participating teams
Argentina	Australia	Chile	Czechoslovakia
Denmark	France	Great Britain	Indonesia
Ireland	Italy	New Zealand	Paraguay
Soviet Union	Sweden	Romania	United States

=== Draw ===
First round 4–6 March
Moscow, Soviet Union (indoor carpet)
France	4
Soviet Union	1
Asunción, Paraguay (indoor carpet)
Czechoslovakia	2
Paraguay	3
Adelaide, Australia (grass)
Australia	4
Great Britain	1
Timișoara, Romania (indoor hard)
Chile	0
Romania	5
Bjärred, Sweden (indoor carpet)
Indonesia	0
Sweden	5
Christchurch, New Zealand (grass)
Denmark	0
New Zealand	5
Reggio Calabria, Italy (clay)
Ireland	2
Italy	3
Buenos Aires, Argentina (clay)
Argentina	3
United States	2

Quarterfinals; 8–10 July
Marseille, France (clay)
France	3
Paraguay	2
Brisbane, Australia (grass)
Australia	5
Romania	0
Eastbourne, United Kingdom (grass)
Sweden	3
New Zealand	2
Rome, Italy (clay)
Italy	0
Argentina	5

Semifinals; 30 September–2 October
Sydney, Australia (grass)
France	1
Australia	4
Stockholm, Sweden (indoor carpet)
Sweden	4
Argentina	1

Final; 26–28 December
Melbourne, Australia (grass)
Australia	3
Sweden	2

== First round ==
=== Soviet Union vs. France ===
Soviet Union
1
Moscow, Soviet Union
4–6 March 1983
Carpet (indoors)

France
4

			1	2	3	4	5
1	(Soviet Union) (France)	Konstantin Pugaev; Yannick Noah	4; 6	4; 6	4; 6
2	(Soviet Union) (France)	Vadim Borisov; Henri Leconte	11; 13	2; 6	2; 6
3	(Soviet Union) (France)	Sergey Leonyuk / Konstantin Pugaev; Henri Leconte / Yannick Noah	3; 6	5; 7	6; 4	6; 4	3; 6
4	(Soviet Union) (France)	Vadim Borisov; Yannick Noah	2; 6	2; 6
5	(Soviet Union) (France)	Konstantin Pugaev; Henri Leconte	10; 8	6; 4

=== Paraguay vs. Czechoslovakia ===
Paraguay
3
Asunción, Paraguay
4–6 March 1983
Carpet (indoors)

Czechoslovakia
2

			1	2	3	4	5
1	(Paraguay) (Czechoslovakia)	Francisco González; Ivan Lendl	3; 6	4; 6	8; 10
2	(Paraguay) (Czechoslovakia)	Víctor Pecci; Tomáš Šmíd	6; 3	3; 6	6; 4	5; 7	6; 1
3	(Paraguay) (Czechoslovakia)	Francisco González / Víctor Pecci; Ivan Lendl / Tomáš Šmíd	6; 4	6; 4	6; 4
4	(Paraguay) (Czechoslovakia)	Francisco González; Tomáš Šmíd	6; 3	12; 10	3; 6	6; 3
5	(Paraguay) (Czechoslovakia)	Victor Caballero; Jaroslav Navrátil	2; 6	0; 6

=== Australia vs. Great Britain ===
Australia
4
Memorial Drive, Adelaide, Australia
4–6 March 1983
Grass

Great Britain
1

			1	2	3	4	5
1	(Australia) (United Kingdom)	Pat Cash; John Lloyd	5; 7	7; 5	6; 3	1; 6	7; 5
2	(Australia) (United Kingdom)	Paul McNamee; Buster Mottram	6; 3	6; 2	6; 2
3	(Australia) (United Kingdom)	Mark Edmondson / Paul McNamee; Andrew Jarrett / John Lloyd	6; 2	9; 11	6; 3	6; 2
4	(Australia) (United Kingdom)	Pat Cash; Buster Mottram	6; 1	5; 7	3; 6
5	(Australia) (United Kingdom)	Paul McNamee; John Lloyd	6; 1	6; 2

=== Romania vs. Chile ===
Romania
5
Timișoara, Romania
4–6 March 1983
Hard (indoors)

Chile
0

			1	2	3	4	5
1	(Romania) (Chile)	Florin Segărceanu; Hans Gildemeister	6; 3	3; 6	0; 6	6; 3	9; 7
2	(Romania) (Chile)	Ilie Năstase; Ricardo Acuña	2; 6	6; 3	6; 2	6; 4
3	(Romania) (Chile)	Ilie Năstase / Florin Segărceanu; Hans Gildemeister / Belus Prajoux	6; 3	8; 6	6; 4
4	(Romania) (Chile)	Florin Segărceanu; Ricardo Acuña	6; 1	7; 5
5	(Romania) (Chile)	Ilie Năstase; Hans Gildemeister	2; 6	6; 4	6; 2

=== Sweden vs. Indonesia ===
Sweden
5
Borgebyhallen, Bjärred, Sweden
4–6 March 1983
Carpet (indoors)

Indonesia
0

			1	2	3	4	5
1	(Sweden) (Indonesia)	Anders Järryd; Tintus Arianto Wibowo	6; 4	6; 2	7; 5
2	(Sweden) (Indonesia)	Mats Wilander; Yustedjo Tarik	6; 2	6; 2	6; 1
3	(Sweden) (Indonesia)	Anders Järryd / Hans Simonsson; Hadiman / Yustedjo Tarik	6; 2	6; 3	6; 3
4	(Sweden) (Indonesia)	Mats Wilander; Tintus Arianto Wibowo	6; 3	6; 3
5	(Sweden) (Indonesia)	Anders Järryd; Yustedjo Tarik	6; 3	6; 1

=== New Zealand vs. Denmark ===
New Zealand
5
Wilding Park, Christchurch, New Zealand
4–6 March 1983
Grass

Denmark
0

			1	2	3	4	5
1	(New Zealand) (Denmark)	Russell Simpson; Michael Mortensen	8; 6	9; 11	6; 4	6; 2
2	(New Zealand) (Denmark)	Chris Lewis; Peter Bastiansen	10; 8	6; 3	7; 5
3	(New Zealand) (Denmark)	Chris Lewis / Russell Simpson; Peter Bastiansen / Michael Mortensen	8; 6	6; 3	6; 4
4	(New Zealand) (Denmark)	Russell Simpson; Peter Bastiansen	6; 1	6; 2
5	(New Zealand) (Denmark)	Chris Lewis; Michael Mortensen	11; 9	6; 3

=== Italy vs. Ireland ===
Italy
3
Reggio Calabria, Italy
4–6 March 1983
Clay

Ireland
2

			1	2	3	4	5
1	(Italy) (Republic of Ireland)	Claudio Panatta; Sean Sorensen	6; 1	4; 6	4; 6	1; 6
2	(Italy) (Republic of Ireland)	Corrado Barazzutti; Matt Doyle	6; 4	6; 3	6; 1
3	(Italy) (Republic of Ireland)	Paolo Bertolucci / Adriano Panatta; Matt Doyle / Sean Sorensen	3; 6	6; 2	6; 2	6; 4
4	(Italy) (Republic of Ireland)	Claudio Panatta; Matt Doyle	6; 1	3; 6	4; 6	4; 6
5	(Italy) (Republic of Ireland)	Corrado Barazzutti; Sean Sorensen	6; 0	6; 3	6; 3

=== Argentina vs. United States ===
Argentina
3
Buenos Aires Lawn Tennis Club, Buenos Aires, Argentina
4–6 March 1983
Clay

United States
2

			1	2	3	4	5
1	(Argentina) (United States)	Guillermo Vilas; Gene Mayer	6; 3	6; 3	6; 4
2	(Argentina) (United States)	José Luis Clerc; John McEnroe	6; 4	6; 0	3; 6	4; 6	7; 5
3	(Argentina) (United States)	José Luis Clerc / Guillermo Vilas; Peter Fleming / John McEnroe	6; 2	8; 10	1; 6	6; 3	1; 6
4	(Argentina) (United States)	Guillermo Vilas; John McEnroe	6; 4	6; 0	6; 1
5	(Argentina) (United States)	Alejandro Ganzábal; Gene Mayer	4; 6	6; 3	8; 10

== Quarterfinals ==
=== France vs. Paraguay ===
France
3
Stade de l'Académie, Marseille, France
8–10 July 1983
Clay

Paraguay
2

			1	2	3	4	5
1	(France) (Paraguay)	Thierry Tulasne; Francisco González	6; 3	8; 6	6; 2
2	(France) (Paraguay)	Henri Leconte; Víctor Pecci	6; 3	1; 6	6; 2	6; 3
3	(France) (Paraguay)	Henri Leconte / Gilles Moretton; Francisco González / Víctor Pecci	4; 6	4; 6	7; 9
4	(France) (Paraguay)	Thierry Tulasne; Víctor Pecci	1; 6	5; 7	6; 4	2; 6
5	(France) (Paraguay)	Henri Leconte; Francisco González	6; 4	6; 4	7; 5

=== Australia vs. Romania ===
Australia
5
Milton Courts, Brisbane, Australia
8–10 July 1983
Grass

Romania
0

			1	2	3	4	5
1	(Australia) (Romania)	Pat Cash; Florin Segărceanu	6; 2	6; 1	6; 1
2	(Australia) (Romania)	Mark Edmondson; Ilie Năstase	4; 6	6; 3	14; 12	6; 2
3	(Australia) (Romania)	Mark Edmondson / Paul McNamee; Ilie Năstase / Florin Segărceanu	8; 6	7; 5	6; 0
4	(Australia) (Romania)	Pat Cash; Ilie Năstase	6; 3	6; 3
5	(Australia) (Romania)	Mark Edmondson; Florin Segărceanu	6; 4	6; 3

=== New Zealand vs. Sweden ===
New Zealand
2
Devonshire Park, Eastbourne, United Kingdom
8–10 July 1983
Grass

Sweden
3

			1	2	3	4	5
1	(New Zealand) (Sweden)	Russell Simpson; Henrik Sundström	9; 7	10; 8	6; 4
2	(New Zealand) (Sweden)	Chris Lewis; Mats Wilander	4; 6	5; 7	8; 6	8; 10
3	(New Zealand) (Sweden)	Chris Lewis / Russell Simpson; Anders Järryd / Hans Simonsson	2; 6	4; 6	6; 4	4; 6
4	(New Zealand) (Sweden)	Chris Lewis; Henrik Sundström	7; 9	6; 4	4; 6	6; 3	6; 3
5	(New Zealand) (Sweden)	Russell Simpson; Mats Wilander	3; 6	3; 6	2; 6

=== Italy vs. Argentina ===
Italy
0
Foro Italico, Rome, Italy
8–10 July 1983
Clay

Argentina
5

			1	2	3	4	5
1	(Italy) (Argentina)	Adriano Panatta; Guillermo Vilas	2; 6	2; 6	1; 6
2	(Italy) (Argentina)	Corrado Barazzutti; José Luis Clerc	10; 12	2; 6	9; 7	6; 3	4; 6
3	(Italy) (Argentina)	Paolo Bertolucci / Adriano Panatta; José Luis Clerc / Guillermo Vilas	5; 7	3; 6	4; 6
4	(Italy) (Argentina)	Corrado Barazzutti; Guillermo Vilas	3; 6	1; 6
5	(Italy) (Argentina)	Francesco Cancellotti; Roberto Argüello	5; 7	4; 6

== Semifinals ==
=== Australia vs. France ===
Australia
4
White City Stadium, Sydney, Australia
30 September–2 October 1983
Grass

France
1

			1	2	3	4	5
1	(Australia) (France)	Pat Cash; Yannick Noah	4; 6	8; 10	3; 6
2	(Australia) (France)	John Fitzgerald; Henri Leconte	4; 6	10; 8	9; 7	6; 2
3	(Australia) (France)	Mark Edmondson / Paul McNamee; Henri Leconte / Yannick Noah	11; 9	6; 4	6; 3
4	(Australia) (France)	John Fitzgerald; Yannick Noah	13; 11	4; 6	6; 4	6; 3
5	(Australia) (France)	Pat Cash; Henri Leconte	3; 6	9; 7	8; 6

=== Sweden vs. Argentina ===
Sweden
4
Kungliga tennishallen, Stockholm, Sweden
30 September–2 October 1983
Carpet (indoors)

Argentina
1

			1	2	3	4	5
1	(Sweden) (Argentina)	Mats Wilander; Guillermo Vilas	6; 4	6; 3	6; 4
2	(Sweden) (Argentina)	Anders Järryd; José Luis Clerc	7; 5	6; 2	6; 2
3	(Sweden) (Argentina)	Anders Järryd / Hans Simonsson; José Luis Clerc / Guillermo Vilas	6; 3	6; 3	6; 4
4	(Sweden) (Argentina)	Anders Järryd; Guillermo Vilas	4; 6	0; 6
5	(Sweden) (Argentina)	Mats Wilander; José Luis Clerc	6; 1	6; 2

== Final ==
=== Australia vs. Sweden ===
Australia
3
Kooyong Stadium, Melbourne, Australia
26–28 December 1983
Grass

Sweden
2

			1	2	3	4	5
1	(Australia) (Sweden)	Pat Cash; Mats Wilander	3; 6	6; 4	7; 9	3; 6
2	(Australia) (Sweden)	John Fitzgerald; Joakim Nyström	6; 4	6; 2	4; 6	6; 4
3	(Australia) (Sweden)	Mark Edmondson / Paul McNamee; Anders Järryd / Hans Simonsson	6; 4	6; 4	6; 2
4	(Australia) (Sweden)	Pat Cash; Joakim Nyström	6; 4	6; 1	6; 1
5	(Australia) (Sweden)	John Fitzgerald; Mats Wilander	8; 6	1; 6	0; 6

== Relegation play-offs ==
The first-round losers played in the Relegation Play-offs. The winners of the play-offs advanced to the 1984 Davis Cup World Group, and the losers were relegated to their respective Zonal Regions.

=== Results summary ===
Date: 30 September–2 October

Home team	Score	Visiting team	Location	Door	Surface	Ref.
Czechoslovakia	4–1	Soviet Union	Hradec Králové	Indoor	Clay	
Great Britain	4–1	Chile	Eastbourne	Outdoor	Grass	
Denmark	4–1	Indonesia	Copenhagen	Indoor	Carpet	
Ireland	1–4	United States	Dublin	Indoor	Carpet	

- Czechoslovakia, Denmark, Great Britain and United States remain in the World Group in 1984.
- Chile, Indonesia, Ireland and Soviet Union are relegated to Zonal competition in 1984.

=== Czechoslovakia vs. Soviet Union ===
Czechoslovakia
4
Hradec Králové, Czechoslovakia
30 September–2 October 1983
Clay (indoors)

Soviet Union
1

			1	2	3	4	5
1	(Czechoslovakia) (Soviet Union)	Tomáš Šmíd; Alexander Zverev	4; 6	8; 6	4; 6	6; 4	6; 4
2	(Czechoslovakia) (Soviet Union)	Miloslav Mečíř; Andrei Chesnokov	8; 10	1; 6	6; 3	6; 4	6; 2
3	(Czechoslovakia) (Soviet Union)	Libor Pimek / Pavel Složil; Andrei Olhovskiy / Alexander Zverev	6; 0	6; 4	6; 2
4	(Czechoslovakia) (Soviet Union)	Tomáš Šmíd; Andrei Chesnokov	6; 2	7; 5
5	(Czechoslovakia) (Soviet Union)	Miloslav Mečíř; Alexander Zverev	3; 6	5; 7

=== Great Britain vs. Chile ===
Great Britain
4
Devonshire Park Lawn Tennis Club, Eastbourne, United Kingdom
30 September–2 October 1983
Grass

Chile
1

			1	2	3	4	5
1	(United Kingdom) (Chile)	John Lloyd; Jaime Fillol	6; 1	7; 5	6; 8	6; 4
2	(United Kingdom) (Chile)	Buster Mottram; Ricardo Acuña	6; 4	6; 3	6; 3
3	(United Kingdom) (Chile)	John Lloyd / Buster Mottram; Jaime Fillol / Belus Prajoux	6; 4	6; 2	6; 1
4	(United Kingdom) (Chile)	Andrew Jarrett; Ricardo Acuña	14; 12	7; 9	0; 6
5	(United Kingdom) (Chile)	Buster Mottram; Jaime Fillol	6; 4	6; 2

=== Denmark vs. Indonesia ===
Denmark
4
Copenhagen, Denmark
30 September–2 October 1983
Carpet (indoors)

Indonesia
1

			1	2	3	4	5
1	(Denmark) (Indonesia)	Michael Mortensen; Yustedjo Tarik	11; 9	6; 3	6; 4
2	(Denmark) (Indonesia)	Peter Bastiansen; Tintus Arianto Wibowo	13; 11	4; 6	6; 1	6; 4
3	(Denmark) (Indonesia)	Peter Bastiansen / Michael Mortensen; Tintus Arianto Wibowo / Yustedjo Tarik	7; 5	6; 2	6; 3
4	(Denmark) (Indonesia)	Peter Bastiansen; Yustedjo Tarik	6; 4	7; 5
5	(Denmark) (Indonesia)	Michael Mortensen; Tintus Arianto Wibowo	4; 6	4; 6

=== Ireland vs. United States ===
Ireland
1
Simmonscourt Pavilion, Dublin, Ireland
30 September–2 October 1983
Carpet (indoors)

United States
4

			1	2	3	4	5
1	(Republic of Ireland) (United States)	Sean Sorensen; John McEnroe	3; 6	2; 6	2; 6
2	(Republic of Ireland) (United States)	Matt Doyle; Eliot Teltscher	6; 3	6; 4	6; 4
3	(Republic of Ireland) (United States)	Matt Doyle / Sean Sorensen; Peter Fleming / John McEnroe	2; 6	3; 6	4; 6
4	(Republic of Ireland) (United States)	Matt Doyle; John McEnroe	7; 9	3; 6	3; 6
5	(Republic of Ireland) (United States)	Sean Sorensen; Eliot Teltscher	16; 14	8; 10	6; 8
