= A Story About Love =

- Theatrical release poster
- Directed by: Aune Sand
- Written by: Aune Sand
- Produced by: Aune Sand
- Starring: Beate Halkjelsvik; Beate Charlotte Lunde; Einar Lund; Aune Sand; Siv Stubsveen; Charlotte Thiis-Evensen
- Edited by: Aune Sand
- Music by: Jo Wang
- Release date: 17 February 1995
- Running time: 70 minutes
- Country: Norway
- Language: Norwegian
- Budget: 300,000 Kroner

A Story About Love (Norwegian: Dis – en historie om kjærlighet) is a 1995 Norwegian romantic film directed by Aune Sand, starring Beate Halkjelsvik, Beate Charlotte Lunde, Einar Lund, Aune Sand, Siv Stubsveen and Charlotte Thiis-Evensen. The film follows different couples and their love stories around the world, in Cairo, Normandy, Oslo, and New York City.

The film was panned by critics and is considered by some to be one of the worst films ever made. The critic Harald Kolstad from Dagsavisen gave it a score of zero out of a scale from one to six, refused to acknowledge Dis as a film, and claimed to have never seen anything worse. Despite this, it became a commercial success, with fans embracing it as being "so bad it's good". Today, it is regarded as a cult film. Aune Sand insists that Dis is a masterpiece.

== See also ==
- List of 20th century films considered the worst
- List of cult films
