= Siv Stubsveen =

Norwegian media personality (born 1968)

Siv Stubsveen (born 7 October 1968) is a Norwegian media personality, known from the radio programme Kjærlighet uten grenser ("Love Without Borders"). She hosted the programme from 1993 to 2004.

She was born in Eidsvoll, and grew up in Hamar. She had a background as a model and saleswoman when she was hired in TVNorge as a continuity announcer. She continued as a hostess in the program Reisesjekken before getting her chance in 1994 as a co-host (with Anne-Lise Hammer and Nini Stoltenberg) in Kvinnene på taket on the channel TV3. In 1995 her own talk show Tilgi meg ("Forgive Me") premiered, where people met and discussed whether they could forgive each other. The show was panned by critics. Not long after she appeared in the film made by her then-boyfriend Aune Sand, A Story About Love (Norwegian: Dis – en historie om kjærlighet), which received an even worse reaction. Even today A Story About Love holds a spot on the Internet Movie Database's bottom 100 list. She was later replaced as the presenter of Tilgi meg by Christina Støp in 1996.

She was more popular for her own radio show Kjærlighet uten grenser ("Love Without Borders"), aired on P4 Radio Hele Norge since 1993. It soon became the country's most listened-to program of its type, a late-night show with interaction with callers. On 29 February 1996 she successfully proposed to marry her then-boyfriend Morten Rønneberg on the air. She had become involved with the former national-tennis-champion-turned-prisoner in late 1995. They broke up in 1997. They had one child together.

Stubsveen continued making Kjærlighet uten grenser on P4 radio for many years. She also made a series of interviews under the moniker Siv møter menn in Se og Hør in the mid-1990s. She later started working in the theme park Hunderfossen Familiepark.
