= Budapest Challenger (September) =

Defunct tennis tournament
- Tour: ATP Challenger Series
- Founded: 1986
- Abolished: 2005
- Location: Budapest, Hungary
- Venue: Római Teniszakadémia
- Category: ATP Challenger Tour
- Surface: Red clay
- Draw: 32S/32Q/16D
- Prize money: $25,000+H

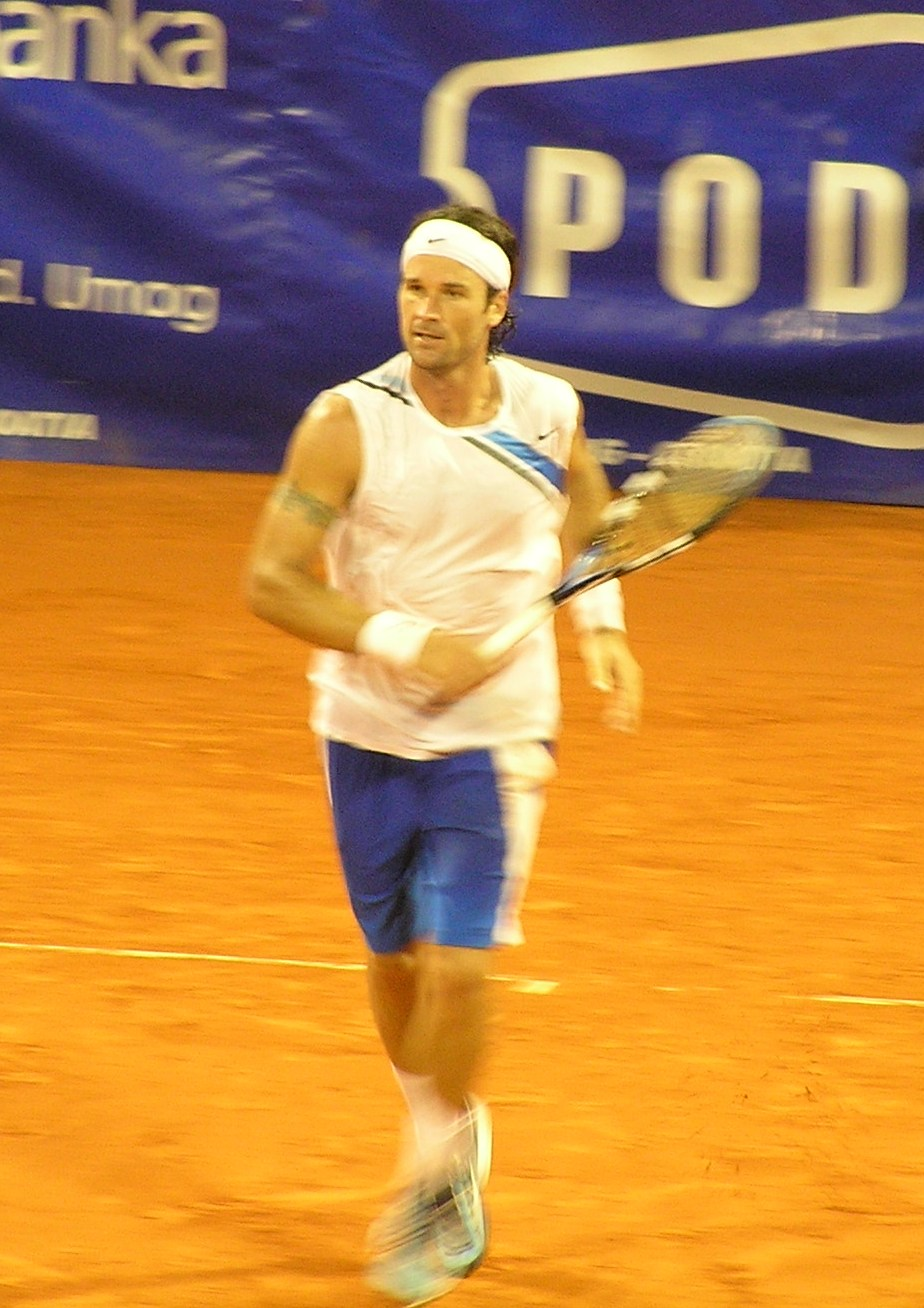
Eventual World No. 1 Carlos Moyá won the tournament in 1995

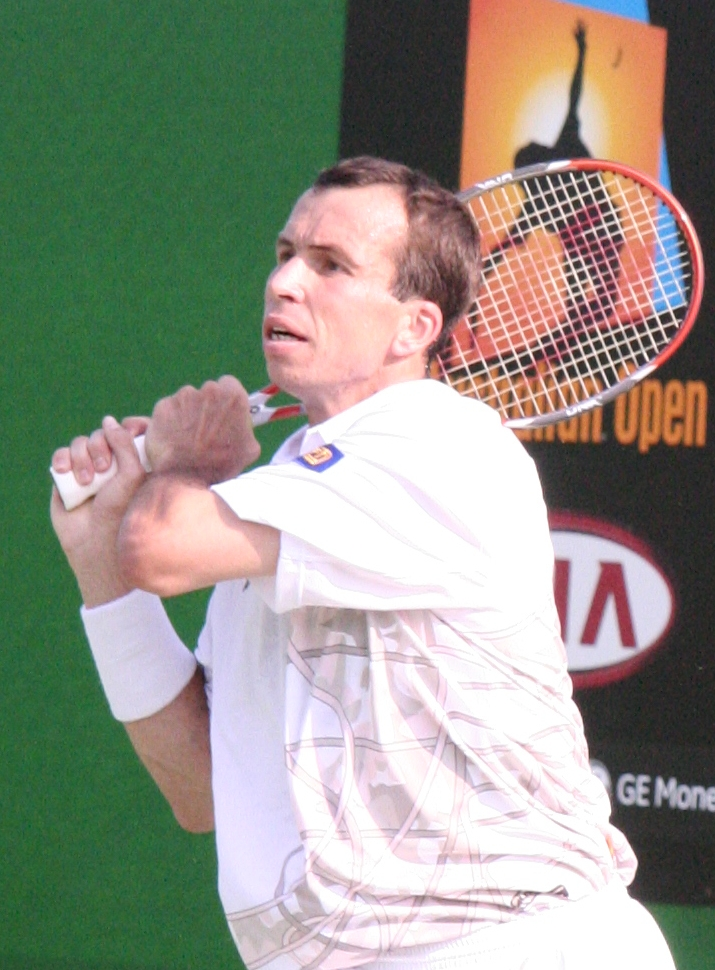
Current (2014) Davis Cup champion Radek Štěpánek reached the doubles final in 1998

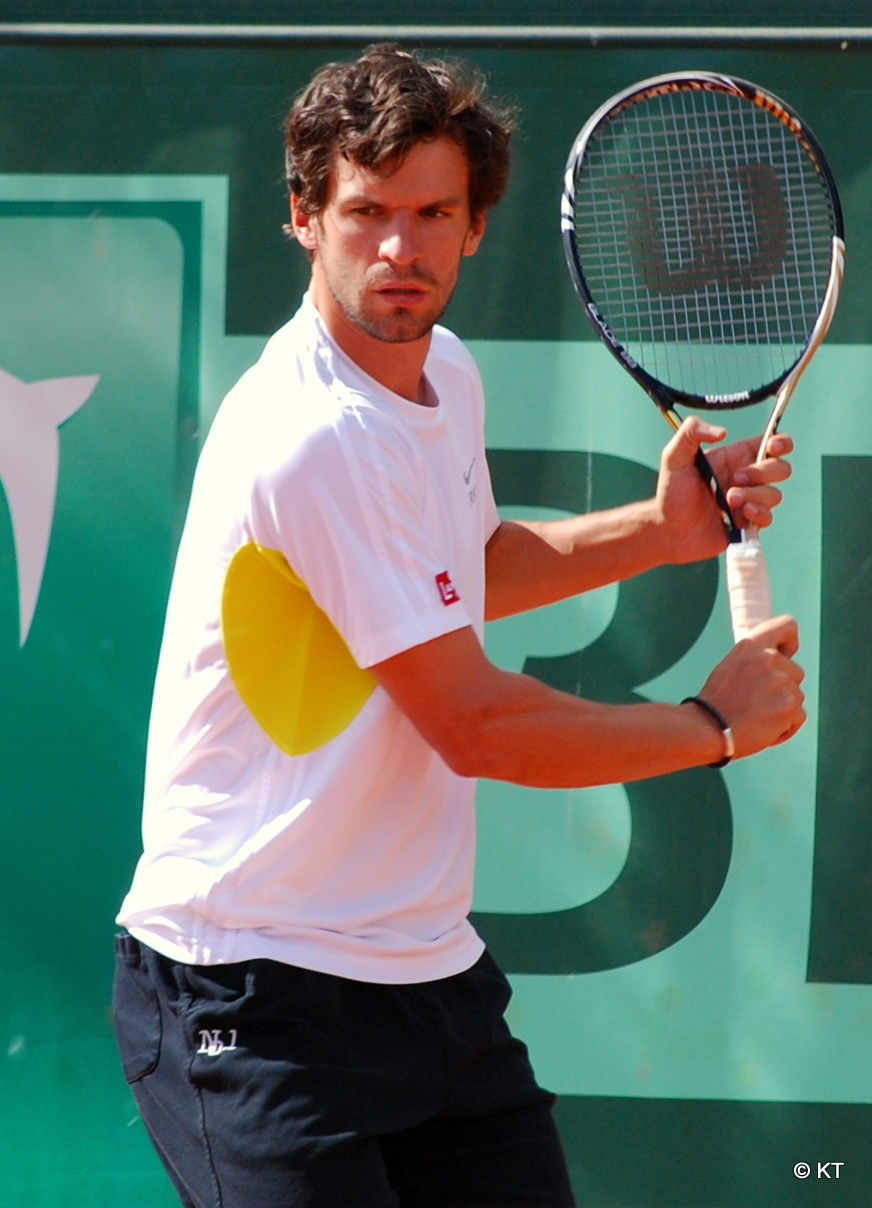
Wimbledon and US Open doubles champion Philipp Petzschner was a runner-up in the 2005 doubles final

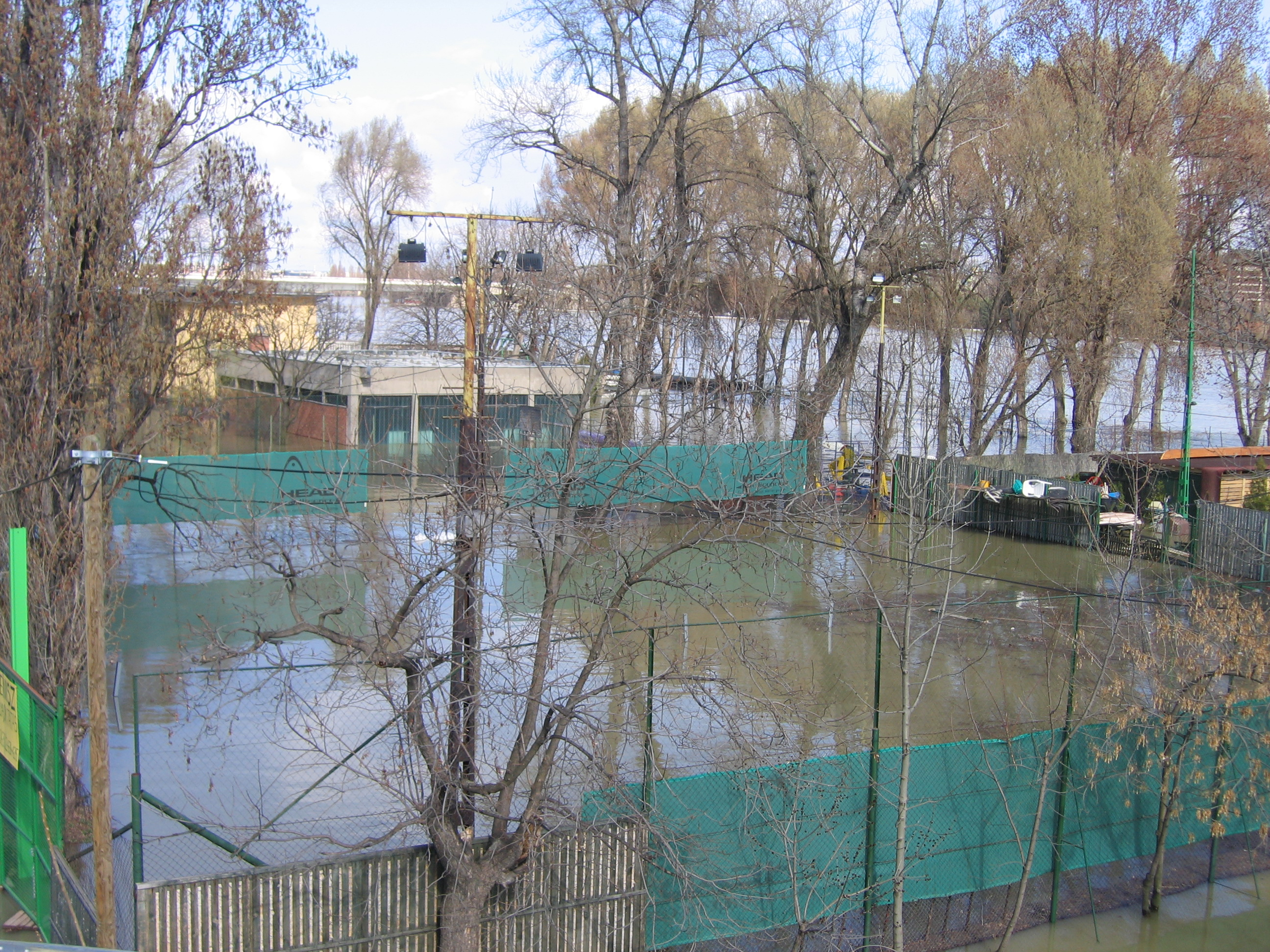
Flooded courts in 2006

The Budapest Challenger was a professional tennis tournament played on outdoor red clay courts. It was the latter one of the two simultaneous challengers played in Hungary with the event taking place usually in September. It was part of the ATP Challenger Tour. It was held annually at the Római Teniszakadémia in Budapest, Hungary, from 1986 to 2005, when during the 2006 Hungarian floodings the courts were washed away and the event spot was replaced by the WOW Cafe Challenger. The most successful player was Sergio Roitman with three doubles titles.

== Past finals ==
=== Singles ===
Year	Champion	Runner-up	Score
2005	(Serbia and Montenegro) Boris Pashanski	(Greece) Vasilis Mazarakis	4–6, 6–3, 6–0
2004	(France) Stéphane Robert	(Italy) Alessio di Mauro	6–1, 4–6, 7–5
2003	(Spain) Marc López	(Argentina) Mariano Delfino	6–4, 2–6, 7–5
2002	(Netherlands) Dennis van Scheppingen	(Spain) Salvador Navarro	3–6, 6–3, 6–4
2001	(Spain) Didac Pérez	(Ukraine) Orest Tereshchuk	6–2, 6–3
2000	(Uzbekistan) Vadim Kutsenko	(Hungary) Sándor Noszály	6–3, 4–6, 7–5
1999	(France) Stéphane Huet	(Austria) Werner Eschauer	6–3, 7–5
1998	(Italy) Renzo Furlan	(Belgium) Christophe van Garsse	6–2, 6–3
1997	(Norway) Jan Frode Andersen	(Brazil) Francisco Costa	7–6^{(7–1)}, 2–6, 6–2
1996	(Romania) Răzvan Sabău	(Hungary) Attila Sávolt	6–2, 6–2
1995	(Spain) Carlos Moyá	(Hungary) József Krocskó	6–2, 6–7, 6–4
1994	(Belgium) Kris Goossens	(Norway) Christian Ruud	4–6, 6–3, 6–2
1993	(France) Jean-Philippe Fleurian	(Hungary) Sándor Noszály	6–4, 6–3
1992	Not held		
1991	Not held		
1990	Not held		
1989	(Sweden) Per Henricsson	(Czechoslovakia) Branislav Stankovič	7–5, 2–6, 7–6
1988	(Switzerland) Roland Stadler	(Hungary) Sándor Noszály	4–6, 6–3, 6–0
1987	(Czechoslovakia) Petr Korda	(Soviet Union) Alexander Zverev	5–7, 6–3, 6–2
1986	(Sweden) Jörgen Windahl	(Czechoslovakia) Jaroslav Navrátil	6–1, 7–5

=== Doubles ===
Year	Champions	Runners-up	Score
2005	(Italy) Leonardo Azzaro (Argentina) Sergio Roitman	(Germany) Philipp Petzschner (Germany) Lars Uebel	6–3, 5–7, 6–3
2004	(Argentina) Juan Pablo Brzezicki (Argentina) Mariano Delfino	(Argentina) Ignacio González King (Argentina) Juan Pablo Guzmán	2–6, 6–3, 6–2
2003	(Argentina) Ignacio González King (Argentina) Juan Pablo Guzmán	(Hungary) Kornél Bardóczky (Hungary) Gergely Kisgyörgy	7–5, 4–6, 6–3
2002	(Australia) Paul Baccanello (Argentina) Sergio Roitman	(Norway) Jan Frode Andersen (Germany) Oliver Gross	6–4, 6–7^{(5–7)}, 6–5 ret.
2001	(Austria) Oliver Marach (Finland) Jarkko Nieminen	(Russia) Yuri Schukin (Ukraine) Orest Tereshchuk	6–2, 6–2
2000	(Argentina) Sergio Roitman (Argentina) Andrés Schneiter	(Czech Republic) David Miketa (Czech Republic) David Škoch	6–3, 6–3
1999	(Israel) Harel Levy (Israel) Noam Okun	(Czech Republic) Daniel Fiala (Czech Republic) Leoš Friedl	6–4, 4–6, 6–2
1998	(Hungary) Gábor Köves (Austria) Tomas Strengberger	(Czech Republic) Leoš Friedl (Czech Republic) Radek Štěpánek	6–4, 6–4
1997	(Serbia and Montenegro) Nebojša Đorđević (Serbia and Montenegro) Dušan Vemić	(Hungary) Kornél Bardóczky (Hungary) Miklós Jancsó	6–1, 3–6, 6–4
1996	(Hungary) Attila Sávolt (Hungary) László Markovits	(Finland) Tuomas Ketola (Slovenia) Borut Urh	w/o
1995	(Portugal) Emanuel Couto (Portugal) João Cunha e Silva	(Hungary) Gábor Köves (Hungary) László Markovits	4–6, 7–5, 6–4
1994	(Portugal) Emanuel Couto (Hungary) Tamás György	(United States) Jeff Belloli (North Macedonia) Aleksandar Kitinov	6–2, 7–5
1993	(Belgium) Tom Vanhoudt (Belgium) Filip Dewulf	(Italy) Stefano Pescosolido (Italy) Massimo Valeri	7–5, 6–3
1992	Not held		
1991	Not held		
1990	Not held		
1989	(Denmark) Peter Bastiansen (Sweden) Per Henricsson	(Romania) Gheorghe Cosac (Romania) Florin Segărceanu	4–6, 6–4, 6–3
1988	(Belgium) Eduardo Masso (Belgium) Denis Langaskens	(Denmark) Peter Bastiansen (Denmark) Peter Flintsø	6–4, 7–5
1987	(Czechoslovakia) Josef Čihák (Czechoslovakia) Cyril Suk	(Sweden) Christer Allgårdh (Sweden) David Engel	6–2, 7–6
1986	(Czechoslovakia) Stanislav Birner (Czechoslovakia) Cyril Suk	(Denmark) Peter Bastiansen (United States) Brett Buffington	4–6, 7–6, 6–4

== Title sponsors ==
- Fujitsu Siemens Open (2003, 2002)
- Architect Open (2005, 2004, 2000)
- Diego Open (2001)
- Medicor Open (1999, 1998, 1997)

== See also ==
- Budapest International Championships (1903–1975) Historical precursor tournament to this event.
- Budapest Grand Prix
- Budapest Challenger (May)
- Stella Artois Clay Court Championships
