= Kimmo Alkio =

Finnish businessman and former tennis player

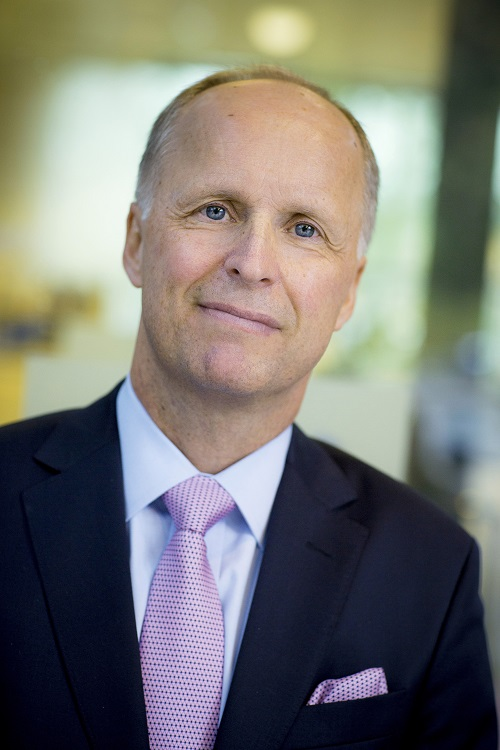
- Country (sports): Finland
- Born: 25 October 1963 (age 62) Helsinki, Finland
- Height: 5 ft 10 in (178 cm)

Singles
- Career record: 2–3 (Davis Cup)
- Highest ranking: No. 338 (6 Aug 1984)

Doubles
- Career record: 1–3 (Davis Cup)
- Highest ranking: No. 194 (19 Sep 1984)

Kimmo Alkio (born 25 October 1963) is a Finnish businessman and former professional tennis player who served as the President/CEO of Finnish IT software and service company Tietoevry.

Active on the tennis tour in the 1980s, Alkio competed as high as ATP Challenger level, winning a doubles titles in Helsinki in 1983. He featured in six Davis Cup ties for Finland from 1981 to 1987, for two singles and one doubles win.

While studying for an undergraduate business degree he played collegiate tennis at Texas A&M.

== ATP Challenger titles ==
=== Doubles: (1) ===
No.	Date	Tournament	Surface	Partner	Opponents	Score
1.	Oct 1983	Helsinki Challenger	Hard	(Finland) Olli Rahnasto	(United States) Erick Iskersky (United Kingdom) Richard Lewis	6–4, 5–7, 6–3

== See also ==
- List of Finland Davis Cup team representatives
