= Swiss Tennis =

Official governing body of tennis in Switzerland

Coordinates: 47.1590°N 7.2780°E

- Sport: Tennis
- Abbreviation: SUIT
- Founded: 1896
- Location: Biel/Bienne, Switzerland

Official website
- www.swisstennis.ch/de/
- (Switzerland)

Swiss Tennis is the governing body of tennis in Switzerland founded in 1896. It is headquartered at the national tennis center in Biel/Bienne, Switzerland.
