= Morten Rønneberg =

Norwegian tennis player

- Country (sports): Norway
- Born: 9 September 1964 (age 60)
- Plays: Right-handed

Singles
- Career record: 0–4
- Highest ranking: No. 302 (9 July 1984)

Doubles
- Career record: 0–1
- Highest ranking: No. 471 (26 November 1984)

Morten Rønneberg (born 9 September 1964) is a Norwegian former professional tennis player.

Rønneberg, who was connected with the Holmenkollen Tennis Club in Oslo, competed on the professional tour in the early 1980s and peaked at 302 in the world, before his career was curtailed by drug use.

A four-time national singles champion, Rønneberg represented the Norway Davis Cup team between 1982 and 1985. On his debut tie in 1982 against Yugoslavia, he took Slobodan Živojinović to five sets, but his only career wins came in two singles rubbers against Portugal in 1984.

Rønneberg was arrested at Oslo airport in 1986 for possession of 10 grams of amphetamines. He made claims in newspaper interviews that cocaine use was common on the international tour, with players even using it during matches by having it on their sweat bands and towels. The charge ended his tennis career and he has since had further problems with the law, including a seven and a half year prison sentence on separate drugs charges.

In the mid 1990s he had a relationship with Norwegian radio personality Siv Stubsveen and the couple had one child.
