= Pedro Cordeiro (tennis) =

Portuguese tennis player (born 1963)

- Country (sports): Portugal
- Born: 14 February 1963 (age 62) Porto, Portugal
- Plays: Right-handed
- Prize money: US$ 7,821

Singles
- Career record: 0–3 (0%)
- Career titles: 0
- Highest ranking: No. 517 (17 November 1986)

Doubles
- Career record: 1–3 (25%)
- Career titles: 0
- Highest ranking: No. 334 (6 July 1987)
- Last updated on: 11 July 2009.

Pedro Cordeiro (born 14 February 1963 in Porto, Portugal) is a former professional tennis player from Portugal and former captain of the Portugal Davis Cup and Fed Cup teams. He reached a career high singles ranking of 517 in November 1986.
