= Tarek El-Sakka =

Egyptian tennis player

- Full name: Tarek-Shawki El-Sakka
- Country (sports): Egypt
- Residence: Dubai, UAE
- Born: 11 October 1962 (age 62); Cairo, United Arab Republic (now Egypt)
- Height: 1.80 m (5 ft 11 in)
- Plays: Right-handed
- Prize money: $2,613

Singles
- Career record: 0-2
- Highest ranking: No. 382 (18 March 1985)

Grand Slam singles results
- Wimbledon Junior: 2R (1978, 1980)

Doubles
- Career record: 0-1
- Highest ranking: No. 314 (18 March 1985)

Team competitions
- Davis Cup: 19–20
Medal record
Mediterranean Games
Silver medal – second place	1983 Casablanca	Singles
Silver medal – second place	1983 Casablanca	Doubles
- Last updated on: 10 April 2020.

Tarek-Shawki El-Sakka (born 11 October 1962) is an Egyptian former tennis player who has been working in the FMCG industry for more than thirty years.

A singles and doubles silver medalist at the 1983 Mediterranean Games, he also played college tennis in the United States for the Southwestern Louisiana Ragin' Cajuns. One of his coaches at the time, Jerry Simmons, said in 2014: "Tarek was the best overall player I had at USL. He could kill you on clay. He was a smart player, and a good doubles player." He was inducted into the University of Louisiana Athletics Hall of Fame in 2023.

== ILTF circuit finals ==
=== Singles 2 (1 win, 1 runner-up) ===
Result	Year	Tournament	Surface	Opponent	Score
Win	1979	Hampshire Tennis Championships	Grass	(United Kingdom) Tim Robson	6–0, 6–2
Loss	1979	Winchester Open	Grass	(United Kingdom) Jeremy Bates	6–7, 4–6
