= 1984 Davis Cup =

1984 edition of the Davis Cup

Details
- Duration: 24 February – 18 December 1984
- Edition: 73rd
- Teams: 61

Champion
- Winning nation: Sweden

The 1984 Davis Cup (also known as the 1984 Davis Cup by NEC for sponsorship purposes) was the 73rd edition of the Davis Cup, the most important tournament between national teams in men's tennis. 62 teams would enter the competition, 16 in the World Group, 25 in the Europe Zone, 12 in the Eastern Zone, and 9 in the Americas Zone. Singapore and Senegal made their first appearances in the tournament.

Sweden defeated the United States in the final, held at the Scandinavium in Gothenburg, Sweden, on 16–18 December, to win their 2nd Davis Cup title.

== World Group ==
Participating teams
| Argentina | Australia | Czechoslovakia | Denmark |
| Ecuador | France | Great Britain | India |
| Italy | New Zealand | Paraguay | Romania |
| Sweden | United States | West Germany | Yugoslavia |

=== Draw ===
First round 24–26 February
Perth, Australia (grass)
Australia | 5
Yugoslavia | 0
Telford, United Kingdom (indoor carpet)
Italy | 3
Great Britain | 2
Stuttgart, West Germany (indoor carpet)
Argentina | 4
West Germany | 1
Bucharest, Romania (indoor carpet)
United States | 5
Romania | 0
Hradec Králové, Czechoslovakia (indoor carpet)
Denmark | 0
Czechoslovakia | 5
New Delhi, India (grass)
India | 1
France | 4
Christchurch, New Zealand (grass)
Paraguay | 3
New Zealand | 2
Norrköping, Sweden (indoor carpet)
Ecuador | 1
Sweden | 4

Quarterfinals; 13–15 July
Brisbane, Australia (grass)
Australia | 5
Italy | 0
Atlanta, GA, United States (indoor carpet)
Argentina | 0
United States | 5
Hradec Králové, Czechoslovakia (indoor carpet)
Czechoslovakia | 3
France | 2
Båstad, Sweden (clay)
Paraguay | 1
Sweden | 4

Semifinals; 28–30 September
Portland, OR, United States (indoor carpet)
Australia | 1
United States | 4
Båstad, Sweden (clay)
Czechoslovakia | 0
Sweden | 5

Final; 16–18 December
Gothenburg, Sweden (indoor clay)
United States | 1
Sweden | 4

=== Final ===
Sweden vs. United States

Sweden
4
Scandinavium, Gothenburg, Sweden
16–18 December 1984
Clay (indoors)

United States
1

| | | | 1 | 2 | 3 | 4 | 5 |
|---|---|---|---|---|---|---|---|
| 1 | (Sweden) (United States) | Mats Wilander; Jimmy Connors | 6; 1 | 6; 3 | 6; 3 |
| 2 | (Sweden) (United States) | Henrik Sundström; John McEnroe | 13; 11 | 6; 4 | 6; 3 |
| 3 | (Sweden) (United States) | Stefan Edberg / Anders Järryd; Peter Fleming / John McEnroe | 7; 5 | 5; 7 | 6; 2 | 7; 5 |
| 4 | (Sweden) (United States) | Mats Wilander; John McEnroe | 3; 6 | 7; 5 | 3; 6 |
| 5 | (Sweden) (United States) | Henrik Sundström; Jimmy Arias | 3; 6 | 8; 6 | 6; 3 |

=== Relegation play-offs ===
Date: 28–30 September

| Home team | Score | Visiting team | Location | Surface |
|---|---|---|---|---|
| Great Britain | 1–4 | Yugoslavia | Eastbourne | Grass |
| West Germany | 5–0 | Romania | West Berlin | Clay |
| Denmark | 2–3 | India | Aarhus | Clay |
| Ecuador | 4–1 | New Zealand | Guayaquil | Clay |

- Ecuador, India, West Germany and Yugoslavia remain in the World Group in 1985.
- Denmark, Great Britain, New Zealand and Romania are relegated to Zonal competition in 1985.

== Americas Zone ==
First round 13–15 January
Chile
bye
bye
Colombia
Canada
bye
Caracas, Venezuela (hard)
Venezuela | 0
Mexico | 5
Caribbean/West Indies
bye
bye
Uruguay
Peru
bye
bye
Brazil

Quarterfinals; 13–15 January; 2–4 March
Santiago, Chile (clay)
Chile | 5
Colombia | 0
Mexico City, Mexico (clay)
Canada | 0
Mexico | 5
Bridgetown, Barbados (clay)
Caribbean/West Indies | 1
Uruguay | 4
Rio de Janeiro, Brazil (clay)
Peru | 0
Brazil | 5

Semifinals; 4–6 May
Santiago, Chile (clay)
Chile | 5
Mexico | 0
Rio de Janeiro, Brazil (clay)
Uruguay | 2
Brazil | 3

Final; 28–30 September
Santiago, Chile (clay)
Chile | 4
Brazil | 1

- Chile are promoted to the World Group in 1985.

== Eastern Zone ==
First round 13–15 January
Indonesia
bye
Karachi, Pakistan (indoor hard)
Pakistan | 4
Malaysia | 1
Thailand
bye
Taipei, Taiwan (indoor hard)
Hong Kong | 3
Chinese Taipei | 2
Guangzhou, China (indoor hard)
Sri Lanka | 1
China | 4
bye
South Korea
Singapore (hard)
Philippines | 5
Singapore | 0
bye
Japan

Quarterfinals; 2–4 March
Rawalpindi, Pakistan (clay)
Indonesia | 1
Pakistan | 4
Causeway Bay, Hong Kong (hard)
Thailand | 5
Hong Kong | 0
Kunming, China (indoor clay)
China | 3
South Korea | 1
Fukuoka, Japan (indoor hard)
Philippines | 0
Japan | 5

Semifinals; 4–6 May
Rawalpindi, Pakistan (clay)
Pakistan | 4
Thailand | 1
Kunming, China (indoor clay)
China | 2
Japan | 3

Final; 28–30 September
Rawalpindi, Pakistan (clay)
Pakistan | 1
Japan | 4

- Japan are promoted to the World Group in 1985.

== Europe Zone ==
=== Zone A ===
First round 4–6 May
Soviet Union
bye
Monte Carlo, Monaco (clay)
Zimbabwe | 1
Monaco | 4
Austria | w/o
Lebanon
Oslo, Norway (clay)
Norway | 4
Portugal | 1
Warsaw, Poland (clay)
Greece | 1
Poland | 4
bye
Israel
Dakar, Senegal (hard)
Senegal | 3
Tunisia | 2
bye
Switzerland

Quarterfinals; 15–17 June
Jūrmala, Soviet Union (clay)
Soviet Union | 5
Monaco | 0
Vienna, Austria (clay)
Austria | 5
Norway | 0
Jerusalem, Israel (hard)
Poland | 0
Israel | 5
Disentis, Switzerland (clay)
Senegal | 0
Switzerland | 5

Semifinals; 13–21 July
Jūrmala, Soviet Union (clay)
Soviet Union | 3
Austria | 2
Ramat HaSharon, Israel (hard)
Israel | 4
Switzerland | 1

Final; 28–30 September
Donetsk, Soviet Union (clay)
Soviet Union | 3
Israel | 2

- Soviet Union are promoted to the World Group in 1985.

=== Zone B ===
First round 4–6 May
Hungary
bye
Cairo, Egypt (clay)
Egypt | 5
Luxembourg | 0
Bulgaria
bye
Istanbul, Turkey (clay)
Belgium | 5
Turkey | 0
Pamplona, Spain (indoor clay)
Spain | 5
Algeria | 0
bye
Netherlands
Casablanca, Morocco (clay)
Finland | 5
Morocco | 0
bye
Ireland

Quarterfinals; 15–17 June
Budapest, Hungary (clay)
Hungary | 4
Egypt | 1
Plovdiv, Bulgaria (clay)
Bulgaria | 2
Belgium | 3
Amsterdam, Netherlands (indoor carpet)
Spain | 3
Netherlands | 2
Helsinki, Finland (clay)
Finland | 2
Ireland | 3

Semifinals; 13–15 July
Brussels, Belgium (clay)
Hungary | 3
Belgium | 2
Vigo, Spain (clay)
Spain | 4
Ireland | 1

Final; 28–30 September
Budapest, Hungary (clay)
Hungary | 1
Spain | 4

- Spain are promoted to the World Group in 1985.
