= Roland Stadler =

Swiss tennis player

- Country (sports): Switzerland
- Born: 14 June 1959 (age 66); Zurich, Switzerland
- Height: 5 ft 10 in (178 cm)
- Plays: Ambidextrous
- Prize money: $110,370

Singles
- Career record: 52-84
- Career titles: 0
- Highest ranking: No. 68 (17 Oct 1983)

Grand Slam singles results
- French Open: 3R (1984)
- Wimbledon: 1R (1981, 1984, 1987)
- US Open: 2R (1981)

Doubles
- Career record: 26-39
- Career titles: 0
- Highest ranking: No. 185 (25 Jun 1984)

Roland Stadler (born 14 June 1959) is a former professional tennis player from Switzerland.

== Career ==
Stadler was one of the few players who used a two-handed grip for both his forehand and backhand.

The Zurich born player was a surprise finalist at the Swiss Open in 1986, coming into the tournament ranked 403 in the world. He defeated three top 40 players, Milan Šrejber, Tomáš Šmíd and Emilio Sánchez. In the final he pushed Stefan Edberg to five sets but was unable to prevail. Some of his other best performances on tour also came at home, with two semi-finals and a quarter-final appearance in Geneva as well as being a semi-finalist at Basel in 1983.

Stadler had his best Grand Slam showing at the 1984 French Open, where he reached the third round, with wins over South Africa's Derek Tarr and local qualifier Loïc Courteau.

He was a regular fixture in the Switzerland Davis Cup team throughout the 1980s and took part in a total of 22 ties. Of his 38 singles rubbers, he finished the victor in 20 of them, including one against Ivan Lendl in 1981, when the Czech retired hurt in a first set tiebreak. He was unbeaten in his three doubles matches.

== Grand Prix career finals ==
=== Singles: 1 (0–1) ===
Result	W-L	Date	Tournament	Surface	Opponent	Score
Loss	0–1	1986	Gstaad, Switzerland	Clay	(Sweden) Stefan Edberg	5–7, 6–4, 1–6, 6–4, 2–6

== Challenger titles ==
=== Singles: (3) ===
No.	Year	Tournament	Surface	Opponent	Score
1.	1983	Brescia, Italy	Clay	(Paraguay) Víctor Pecci	6–3, 6–1
2.	1988	Waiblingen, West Germany	Clay	(West Germany) Frank Dennhardt	6–4, 6–4
3.	1988	Budapest, Hungary	Clay	(Hungary) Sándor Noszály	4–6, 6–3, 6–0

=== Doubles: (1) ===
No.	Year	Tournament	Surface	Partner	Opponents	Score
1.	1982	Travemünde, West Germany	Clay	(West Germany) Wolfgang Popp	(Australia) Brad Guan (Australia) Warren Maher	6–4, 6–2
