= Sean Sorensen =

German-born Irish tennis player

- Country (sports): (Republic of Ireland) Ireland
- Residence: Stuttgart, Germany
- Born: 11 December 1955 (age 69)
- Plays: Left-handed

Singles
- Career record: 4-22
- Career titles: 0
- Highest ranking: No. 203 (22 Dec 1980)

Grand Slam singles results
- Wimbledon: 1R (1977, 1980)

Doubles
- Career record: 2-17
- Career titles: 0
- Highest ranking: No. 324 (3 Jan 1983)

Grand Slam doubles results
- French Open: 1R (1982)
- Wimbledon: 1R (1978, 1980)

Sean Sorensen (born 11 December 1955) is a former professional tennis player from Ireland.

== Career ==
When Sorensen qualified for the 1977 Wimbledon Championships, he became the first Irishman to appear in the main draw of a Grand Slam in the Open Era. He was beaten in the opening round by Rod Laver.

In 1980 he was a quarter-finalist at the Grand Prix event in Metz, defeating Craig Wittus and Kim Warwick en route. Later that year, Sorensen played at Wimbledon for a second time, but was again unable to reach the second round, losing to Patrice Dominguez.

He had one of the best wins of his career in the 1984 German Open, where he upset Sammy Giammalva Jr. The man who won that tournament, Juan Aguilera, a top 20 player, would be defeated by Sorensen in a Davis Cup match that year.

Sorensen's Davis Cup career started in 1976 and he took part in 21 ties before retiring in 1987. The Irishman was a member of the team which competed in the World Group in 1983, playing ties against Italy and the United States. He won 28 matches out of the 54 matches that he played for Ireland, with a 19/15 record in singles and 9/11 record in doubles rubbers. His doubles partnership with Matt Doyle, which resulted in six wins, is the most successful in Irish Davis Cup history.

== Personal ==
During his career and for another 20 years after, Sorensen lived in Germany, but has since returned to Ireland. While in Stuttgart he had two sons, Kevin and Louk, who have both also played Davis Cup tennis.
