= Peter Bastiansen (tennis) =

Danish tennis player

- Full name: Peter Bastiansen
- Country (sports): Denmark
- Born: 3 May 1962 (age 62); Copenhagen, Denmark
- Plays: Right-handed
- Prize money: $62,785

Singles
- Career record: 10–13
- Career titles: 0
- Highest ranking: No. 224 (4 February 1985)

Doubles
- Career record: 10–14
- Career titles: 0
- Highest ranking: No. 158 (24 November 1986)

Grand Slam doubles results
- French Open: 1R (1987)

Peter Bastiansen (born 3 May 1962) is a former professional tennis player from Denmark.

== Biography ==
Bastiansen was a regular member of the Denmark Davis Cup team throughout the 1980s, which included stints in the World Group. He won 18 of the 29 singles matches that he played. All of his 16 doubles rubbers were with Michael Mortensen, for 10 wins. He helped Denmark qualify for the World Group for the first time when he won both of his singles rubbers in the 1982 Europe Zone final against Hungary in Budapest. The win in the reverse singles was over Balázs Taróczy and kept them in the tie, before Mortensen won it for Denmark in the final rubber. He was a member of the Danish team that defeated Spain in the 1988 Davis Cup World Group, to make the quarter-finals.

His touring career began in 1982 and he won a Challenger title that year, the Tampere Open. In 1983 he had a win over former world number one Ilie Năstase at a Grand Prix tournament in Viña del Mar. Another good win came at the 1983 WCT Tournament of Champions where he upset American player Brian Teacher. He made the quarter-finals at the Campionati Internazionali di Sicilia in Palermo in 1984, as a qualifier.

He played in one Grand Slam event, the men's doubles at the 1987 French Open, partnering Michael Tauson.

== Challenger titles ==
=== Singles: (1) ===
No.	Year	Tournament	Surface	Opponent	Score
1.	1982	Tampere, Finland	Clay	(United States) Steve Krulevitz	3–6, 7–5, 6–2

=== Doubles: (3) ===
No.	Year	Tournament	Surface	Partner	Opponents	Score
1.	1983	Tampere, Finland	Clay	(Denmark) Michael Mortensen	(United States) Mike Barr (Socialist Federal Republic of Yugoslavia) Marko Ostoja	6–4, 6–1
2.	1983	Thessaloniki, Greece	Clay	(Denmark) Michael Mortensen	(South Africa) Mike Myburg (Finland) Leo Palin	7–6, 7–5
3.	1989	Budapest, Hungary	Clay	(Sweden) Per Henricsson	(Romania) George Cosac (Romania) Florin Segărceanu	4–6, 6–4, 6–3

== See also ==
- List of Denmark Davis Cup team representatives
