= 1993 Davis Cup Europe/Africa Zone Group II =

International tennis competition

The Europe/Africa Zone was one of the three zones of the regional Davis Cup competition in 1993.

In the Europe/Africa Zone there were three different tiers, called groups, in which teams competed against each other to advance to the upper tier. Winners in Group II advanced to the Europe/Africa Zone Group I. Teams who lost their respective ties competed in the relegation play-offs, with winning teams remaining in Group II, whereas teams who lost their play-offs were relegated to the Europe/Africa Zone Group III in 1994.

== Participating nations ==
- Algeria
- Bulgaria
- Cyprus
- Egypt
- Ghana
- Greece
- Ireland
- Ivory Coast
- Monaco
- Morocco
- Nigeria
- Poland
- Romania
- Senegal
- South Africa
- Tunisia

=== Draw ===
Relegation Play-offs
Abidjan, Ivory Coast (hard)
Poland	3
Ivory Coast	1
Carthage, Tunisia (clay)
Tunisia	0
Egypt	5
Accra, Ghana (hard)
Ghana	5
Cyprus	0
Lagos, Nigeria (hard)
Algeria	0
Nigeria	5

First Round
Sofia, Bulgaria (clay)
Poland	2
Bulgaria	3
Johannesburg, South Africa (hard)
Ivory Coast	0
South Africa	5
Athens, Greece (clay)
Greece	5
Tunisia	0
Dakar, Senegal (hard)
Senegal	4
Egypt	1
Dublin, Ireland (carpet)
Ghana	0
Ireland	5
Casablanca, Morocco (clay)
Cyprus	0
Morocco	5
Monte Carlo, Monaco (clay)
Algeria	1
Monaco	4
Lagos, Nigeria (hard)
Nigeria	1
Romania	4

Second Round
Sofia, Bulgaria (clay)
Bulgaria	1
South Africa	4
Dakar, Senegal (hard)
Greece	2
Senegal	3
Casablanca, Morocco (clay)
Ireland	2
Morocco	3
Monte Carlo, Monaco (clay)
Monaco	0
Romania	5

Third Round
Dakar, Senegal (hard)
South Africa	5
Senegal	0
Bucharest, Romania (clay)
Morocco	1
Romania	4

- Ivory Coast, Tunisia, Cyprus, and Algeria relegated to Group III in 1994.
- South Africa and Romania promoted to Group I in 1994.

== First round ==
=== Bulgaria vs. Poland ===
Bulgaria
3
Levski Spartak Tennis Club, Sofia, Bulgaria
30 April–2 May 1993
Clay

Poland
2

			1	2	3	4	5
1	(Bulgaria) (Poland)	Milen Velev; Darek Nowicki	7; 5	6; 4	7^{8} 6^{6}
2	(Bulgaria) (Poland)	Ivan Keskinov; Bartłomiej Dąbrowski	3; 6	7^{9} 6^{7}	5; 7	5; 7
3	(Bulgaria) (Poland)	Krassimir Lazarov / Milen Velev; Tomasz Iwański / Darek Nowicki	6; 4	5; 7	5; 7	2; 6
4	(Bulgaria) (Poland)	Milen Velev; Bartłomiej Dąbrowski	6; 2	5; 7	6; 4	6; 1
5	(Bulgaria) (Poland)	Ivan Keskinov; Darek Nowicki	4; 6	6^{2} 7^{7}	6; 2	6; 3	7; 5

=== South Africa vs. Ivory Coast ===
South Africa
5
Standard Bank Arena, Johannesburg, South Africa
30 April–2 May 1993
Hard

Ivory Coast
0

			1	2	3	4	5
1	(South Africa) (Ivory Coast)	Wayne Ferreira; Jean-Christophe Nabi	6; 4	6; 3	6; 2
2	(South Africa) (Ivory Coast)	Marcos Ondruska; Claude N'Goran	6; 3	6; 4	6; 4
3	(South Africa) (Ivory Coast)	Wayne Ferreira / Marcos Ondruska; Ilou Lonfo / Claude N'Goran	6; 2	6; 2	7^{7} 6^{4}
4	(South Africa) (Ivory Coast)	Wayne Ferreira; Claude N'Goran	6; 1	6; 4
5	(South Africa) (Ivory Coast)	Marcos Ondruska; Jean-Christophe Nabi	7; 5	6; 3

=== Greece vs. Tunisia ===
Greece
5
Olympic Tennis Centre, Athens, Greece
30 April–2 May 1993
Clay

Tunisia
0

			1	2	3	4	5
1	(Greece) (Tunisia)	Konstantinos Efraimoglou; Adel Lahdhiri	6^{4} 7^{7}	6; 2	7^{8} 6^{6}	6; 3
2	(Greece) (Tunisia)	Anastasios Bavelas; Selim Ben Hadjali	6; 2	6; 1	6; 1
3	(Greece) (Tunisia)	Anastasios Bavelas / Konstantinos Efraimoglou; Selim Ben Hadjali / Elias Bramly	6; 1	6; 3	6; 1
4	(Greece) (Tunisia)	Konstantinos Efraimoglou; Selim Ben Hadjali	6; 2	6; 1
5	(Greece) (Tunisia)	Anastasios Bavelas; Adel Lahdhiri	6; 3	6; 3

=== Senegal vs. Egypt ===
Senegal
4
Olympique Club, Dakar, Senegal
30 April–2 May 1993
Hard

Egypt
1

			1	2	3	4	5
1	(Senegal) (Egypt)	Fadel Berthé; Khaled El-Salawy	6; 3	5; 7	6; 2	6; 4
2	(Senegal) (Egypt)	Abou Berthé; Tamer El-Sawy	3; 6	4; 6	3; 6
3	(Senegal) (Egypt)	Abou Berthé / Fadel Berthé; Khaled El-Salawy / Tamer El-Sawy	3; 6	2; 6	6; 4	6; 3	7; 5
4	(Senegal) (Egypt)	Fadel Berthé; Tamer El-Sawy	3; 6	6; 2	6; 3	7^{7} 6^{4}
5	(Senegal) (Egypt)	Abou Berthé; Karim Afifi	6; 1	6; 0

=== Ireland vs. Ghana ===
Ireland
5
Fitzwilliam Lawn Tennis Club, Dublin, Ireland
30 April–2 May 1993
Carpet

Ghana
0

			1	2	3	4	5
1	(Republic of Ireland) (Ghana)	Owen Casey; Emmanuel Paddi	6; 4	6; 3	6; 2
2	(Republic of Ireland) (Ghana)	Eoin Collins; Franklyn Ofori	3; 6	6; 0	6; 3	7^{7} 6^{5}
3	(Republic of Ireland) (Ghana)	Owen Casey / Peter Wright; Franklyn Ofori / Emmanuel Paddi	6; 2	6; 1	7; 5
4	(Republic of Ireland) (Ghana)	Owen Casey; Franklyn Ofori	6; 1	6; 3
5	(Republic of Ireland) (Ghana)	Derek Farren; Emmanuel Paddi	6; 4	6; 1

=== Morocco vs. Cyprus ===
Morocco
5
Complexe Al Amal, Casablanca, Morocco
30 April–2 May 1993
Clay

Cyprus
0

			1	2	3	4	5
1	(Morocco) (Cyprus)	Karim Alami; Alkis Papamichael	6; 3	6; 0	6; 1
2	(Morocco) (Cyprus)	Mohammed Ridaoui; Yiannos Hadjigeorgiou	6; 1	6; 1	6; 1
3	(Morocco) (Cyprus)	Karim Alami / Mohammed Ridaoui; Marinos Baghdatis / Savvas Constantinou	6; 2	6; 0	6; 3
4	(Morocco) (Cyprus)	Mehdi Tahiri; Yiannos Hadjigeorgiou	6; 1	6; 1
5	(Morocco) (Cyprus)	Mohammed Ridaoui; Alkis Papamichael	6; 3	6; 3

=== Monaco vs. Algeria ===
Monaco
4
Tennis Club de Monaco, Monte Carlo, Monaco
30 April–2 May 1993
Clay

Algeria
1

			1	2	3	4	5
1	(Monaco) (Algeria)	Philippe Ventura; Abdelhak Hameurlaine	6; 2	4; 6	4; 6	2; 6
2	(Monaco) (Algeria)	Jérôme Seguin; Sadri Gueche	6; 1	7^{8} 6^{6}	4; 6	7; 5
3	(Monaco) (Algeria)	Christophe Boggetti / Jérôme Seguin; Sadri Gueche / Abdelhak Hameurlaine	3; 6	7; 5	6; 0	6; 3
4	(Monaco) (Algeria)	Jérôme Seguin; Abdelhak Hameurlaine	6; 3	6; 1	6; 1
5	(Monaco) (Algeria)	Philippe Ventura; Sadri Gueche	7; 5	6; 2

=== Nigeria vs. Romania ===
Nigeria
1
National Stadium, Lagos, Nigeria
30 April–2 May 1993
Hard

Romania
4

			1	2	3	4	5
1	(Nigeria) (Romania)	Nduka Odizor; Răzvan Sabău	7; 5	2; 6	4; 6	2; 6
2	(Nigeria) (Romania)	Ganiyu Adenekan; Dinu Pescariu	1; 6	4; 6	2; 6
3	(Nigeria) (Romania)	George Elawure / Nduka Odizor; George Cosac / Ciprian Petre Porumb	4; 6	2; 6	2; 6
4	(Nigeria) (Romania)	Nduka Odizor; Dinu Pescariu	7^{7} 6^{5}	6; 2
5	(Nigeria) (Romania)	Ganiyu Adenekan; Răzvan Sabău	0; 6	6^{4} 7^{7}

== Second round ==
=== Bulgaria vs. South Africa ===
Bulgaria
1
Levski Spartak Tennis Club, Sofia, Bulgaria
16–18 July 1993
Clay

South Africa
4

			1	2	3	4	5
1	(Bulgaria) (South Africa)	Milen Velev; Marcos Ondruska	6; 4	6; 4	1; 6	6; 1
2	(Bulgaria) (South Africa)	Ivan Keskinov; Wayne Ferreira	0; 6	3; 6	4; 6
3	(Bulgaria) (South Africa)	Krassimir Lazarov / Milko Petkov; Wayne Ferreira / Piet Norval	1; 6	6^{4} 7^{7}	2; 6
4	(Bulgaria) (South Africa)	Milen Velev; Wayne Ferreira	3; 6	6; 3	6; 4	4; 6	2; 6
5	(Bulgaria) (South Africa)	Ivan Keskinov; Marcos Ondruska	2; 6	4; 6

=== Senegal vs. Greece ===
Senegal
3
Olympique Club, Dakar, Senegal
16–18 July 1993
Hard

Greece
2

			1	2	3	4	5
1	(Senegal) (Greece)	Fadel Berthé; Anastasios Bavelas	4; 6	2; 6	6; 1	6; 3	4; 6
2	(Senegal) (Greece)	Yahiya Doumbia; Konstantinos Efraimoglou	6; 4	7; 5	6; 3
3	(Senegal) (Greece)	Fadel Berthé / Yahiya Doumbia; Anastasios Bavelas / Konstantinos Efraimoglou	6; 3	4; 6	6; 4	7^{7} 6^{4}
4	(Senegal) (Greece)	Yahiya Doumbia; Anastasios Bavelas	6; 3	6; 4	6; 2
5	(Senegal) (Greece)	Fadel Berthé; Konstantinos Efraimoglou	5; 7	4; 6

=== Morocco vs. Ireland ===
Morocco
3
Complexe Al Amal, Casablanca, Morocco
16–18 July 1993
Clay

Ireland
2

			1	2	3	4	5
1	(Morocco) (Republic of Ireland)	Younes El Aynaoui; Peter Wright	6; 2	6; 1	6; 1
2	(Morocco) (Republic of Ireland)	Karim Alami; Eoin Collins	6; 1	7; 5	6; 2
3	(Morocco) (Republic of Ireland)	Karim Alami / Mohammed Ridaoui; Eoin Collins / Peter Wright	4; 6	1; 6	6; 2	7^{7} 6^{5}	8; 10
4	(Morocco) (Republic of Ireland)	Younes El Aynaoui; Eoin Collins	6; 0	6; 2	7; 5
5	(Morocco) (Republic of Ireland)	Mehdi Tahiri; Scott Barron	6^{5} 7^{7}	3; 6

=== Monaco vs. Romania ===
Monaco
0
Tennis Club de Monaco, Monte Carlo, Monaco
16–18 July 1993
Clay

Romania
5

			1	2	3	4	5
1	(Monaco) (Romania)	Jérôme Seguin; Răzvan Sabău	1; 6	6; 2	3; 6	5; 7
2	(Monaco) (Romania)	Christophe Boggetti; Dinu Pescariu	3; 6	3; 6	4; 6
3	(Monaco) (Romania)	Jérôme Seguin / Philippe Ventura; George Cosac / Ciprian Petre Porumb	2; 6	4; 6	4; 6
4	(Monaco) (Romania)	Jérôme Seguin; Dinu Pescariu	6^{4} 7^{7}	6; 2	2; 6
5	(Monaco) (Romania)	Christophe Boggetti; Răzvan Sabău	1; 6	4; 6

== Relegation play-offs ==
=== Ivory Coast vs. Poland ===
Ivory Coast
1
Hôtel Ivoire, Abidjan, Ivory Coast
16–18 July 1993
Hard

Poland
3

			1	2	3	4	5
1	(Ivory Coast) (Poland)	Jean-Christophe Nabi; Wojciech Kowalski	6; 1	5; 7	5; 7	3; 6
2	(Ivory Coast) (Poland)	Claude N'Goran; Bartłomiej Dąbrowski	6; 2	7; 5	4; 6	3; 6	6; 3
3	(Ivory Coast) (Poland)	Ilou Lonfo / Claude N'Goran; Tomasz Iwański / Wojciech Kowalski	4; 6	6^{3} 7^{7}	7^{7} 6^{5}	1; 6
4	(Ivory Coast) (Poland)	Claude N'Goran; Wojciech Kowalski	2; 6	7^{7} 6^{1}	6; 3	2; 6	5; 7
5	(Ivory Coast) (Poland)	Jean-Christophe Nabi; Bartłomiej Dąbrowski

=== Tunisia vs. Egypt ===
Tunisia
0
Tennis Club de Carthage, Carthage, Tunisia
16–18 July 1993
Clay

Egypt
5

			1	2	3	4	5
1	(Tunisia) (Egypt)	Hichem Bramly; Tamer El-Sawy	0; 6	1; 6	1; 6
2	(Tunisia) (Egypt)	Adel Lahdhiri; Khaled El-Salawy	5; 7	0; 6	6; 4	3; 6
3	(Tunisia) (Egypt)	Adel Brahim / Adel Lahdhiri; Khaled El-Salawy / Tamer El-Sawy	1; 6	2; 6	2; 6
4	(Tunisia) (Egypt)	Adel Lahdhiri; Tamer El-Sawy	1; 6	6^{1} 7^{7}
5	(Tunisia) (Egypt)	Hichem Bramly; Bassel Rahmy	1; 6	0; 6

=== Ghana vs. Cyprus ===
Ghana
5
Accra Sports Stadium, Accra, Ghana
16–18 July 1993
Hard

Cyprus
0

			1	2	3	4	5
1	(Ghana) (Cyprus)	Franklyn Ofori; Marinos Baghdatis	6; 2	6; 3	6; 1
2	(Ghana) (Cyprus)	Isaac Donkor; Alkis Papamichael	7; 5	6; 4	6; 4
3	(Ghana) (Cyprus)	Kenneth Dowuona / Franklyn Ofori; Marinos Baghdatis / Savvas Constantinou	6; 3	6; 2	6; 4
4	(Ghana) (Cyprus)	Franklyn Ofori; Alkis Papamichael	6; 2	6; 4
5	(Ghana) (Cyprus)	Isaac Donkor; Marinos Baghdatis	6; 2	6; 4

=== Nigeria vs. Algeria ===
Nigeria
5
National Stadium, Lagos, Nigeria
8–10 October 1993
Hard

Algeria
0

			1	2	3	4	5
1	(Nigeria) (Algeria)	Emmanuel Udozorh; Abdelhak Hameurlaine	5; 7	7; 5	7; 5	6; 3
2	(Nigeria) (Algeria)	Sule Ladipo; Noujeim Hakimi	6; 0	6; 1	6; 2
3	(Nigeria) (Algeria)	Sule Ladipo / Emmanuel Udozorh; Noujeim Hakimi / Noureddine Mahmoudi	6; 3	6; 2	6; 0
4	(Nigeria) (Algeria)	Sule Ladipo; Noureddine Mahmoudi	6; 0	6; 2
5	(Nigeria) (Algeria)	Emmanuel Udozorh; Noujeim Hakimi	6; 1	6; 1

== Third round ==
=== Senegal vs. South Africa ===
Senegal
0
Olympique Club, Dakar, Senegal
24–26 September 1993
Hard

South Africa
5

			1	2	3	4	5
1	(Senegal) (South Africa)	Fadel Berthé; Marcos Ondruska	2; 6	2; 6	0; 6
2	(Senegal) (South Africa)	Abou Berthé; Wayne Ferreira	3; 6	4; 6	2; 6
3	(Senegal) (South Africa)	Abou Berthé / Fadel Berthé; Wayne Ferreira / Piet Norval	6^{5} 7^{7}	3; 6	1; 6
4	(Senegal) (South Africa)	Fadel Berthé; Wayne Ferreira	1; 6	3; 6
5	(Senegal) (South Africa)	Abou Berthé; Marcos Ondruska	4; 6	1; 6

=== Romania vs. Morocco ===
Romania
4
Club Sportiv Progresul, Bucharest, Romania
24–26 September 1993
Clay

Morocco
1

			1	2	3	4	5
1	(Romania) (Morocco)	Dinu Pescariu; Hicham Arazi	6; 3	7; 5	6; 1
2	(Romania) (Morocco)	Răzvan Sabău; Younes El Aynaoui	5; 7	3; 6	0; 6
3	(Romania) (Morocco)	George Cosac / Ciprian Petre Porumb; Younes El Aynaoui / Mohammed Ridaoui	7^{7} 6^{5}	6; 3	7; 5
4	(Romania) (Morocco)	Dinu Pescariu; Younes El Aynaoui	6; 4	6; 4	7^{7} 6^{5}
5	(Romania) (Morocco)	Răzvan Sabău; Mohammed Ridaoui	6; 0	4; 6	6; 2
