= 1989 Davis Cup Europe Zone Group II =

International tennis competition

The Europe/Africa Zone was one of the three zones of the regional Davis Cup competition in 1989.

In the Europe/Africa Zone there were two different tiers, called groups, in which teams competed against each other to advance to the upper tier. The winner in the Europe Zone Group II advanced to the Europe/Africa Zone Group I in 1990.

== Participating nations ==
- Belgium
- Bulgaria
- Cyprus
- Greece
- Luxembourg
- Malta
- Monaco
- Norway
- Poland
- Turkey

=== Draw ===
First round 7–9 April
Belgium
bye
bye
Turkey
Norway
bye
Luxembourg City, Luxembourg (indoor hard)
Luxembourg	5
Malta	0
Poland
bye
bye
Greece
Monte Carlo, Monaco (clay)
Cyprus	0
Monaco	5
bye
Bulgaria

Second Round; 5–14 May
Liège, Belgium (clay)
Belgium	5
Turkey	0
Luxembourg City, Luxembourg (indoor hard)
Norway	2
Luxembourg	3
Warsaw, Poland (clay)
Poland	2
Greece	3
Monte Carlo, Monaco (clay)
Monaco	3
Bulgaria	1

Third Round; 15–18 June
Luxembourg City, Luxembourg (indoor hard)
Belgium	5
Luxembourg	0
Athens, Greece (clay)
Greece	3
Monaco	2

Third Round; 21–23 July
Athens, Greece (clay)
Belgium	5
Greece	0

- Belgium promoted to Group I in 1990.

== First round ==
=== Luxembourg vs. Malta ===
Luxembourg
5
Tennis Club Bonnevoie, Luxembourg City, Luxembourg
7–9 April 1989
Hard (indoors)

Malta
0

			1	2	3	4	5
1	(Luxembourg) (Malta)	Serge Brueck; Daryl Delicata	6; 1	6; 0	6; 1
2	(Luxembourg) (Malta)	Johny Goudenbour; Gordon Asciak	6; 2	6; 4	6; 4
3	(Luxembourg) (Malta)	Serge Brueck / Johny Goudenbour; Gordon Asciak / Daryl Delicata	6; 2	6; 1	6; 2
4	(Luxembourg) (Malta)	Johny Goudenbour; Steven Schranz	6; 0	6; 0
5	(Luxembourg) (Malta)	Serge Brueck; Gordon Asciak	6; 0	7^{7} 6^{3}

=== Monaco vs. Cyprus ===
Monaco
5
Tennis Club de Monaco, Monte Carlo, Monaco
7–9 April 1989
Clay

Cyprus
0

			1	2	3	4	5
1	(Monaco) (Cyprus)	Jérôme Seguin; Yiannos Hadjigeorgiou	7^{7} 6^{5}	6; 1	6; 2
2	(Monaco) (Cyprus)	Gilles Ganancia; Alkis Papamichael	6; 4	1; 6	6; 4	6^{4} 7^{7}	6; 4
3	(Monaco) (Cyprus)	Christophe Boggetti / Jaques Vinciléoni; Alkis Papamichael / Phivos Zachariades	6; 2	6; 1	7; 5
4	(Monaco) (Cyprus)	Gilles Ganancia; Neoclis Neocleous	6; 0	6; 0
5	(Monaco) (Cyprus)	Jérôme Seguin; Alkis Papamichael	6; 2	6; 1

== Second round ==
=== Belgium vs. Turkey ===
Belgium
5
Sports Village Tennis Club, Liège, Belgium
5–7 May 1989
Clay

Turkey
0

			1	2	3	4	5
1	(Belgium) (Turkey)	Denis Langaskens; Alaaddin Karagöz	6; 0	6; 0	6; 4
2	(Belgium) (Turkey)	Bart Wuyts; Yavuz Erkangil	6; 2	6; 2	6; 1
3	(Belgium) (Turkey)	Xavier Daufresne / Denis Langaskens; Yavuz Erkangil / Alaaddin Karagöz	6; 3	6; 1	6; 1
4	(Belgium) (Turkey)	Bart Wuyts; Alaaddin Karagöz	6; 4	6^{4} 7^{7}	6; 1
5	(Belgium) (Turkey)	Denis Langaskens; Yavuz Erkangil	6; 3	6; 3

=== Luxembourg vs. Norway ===
Luxembourg
3
Tennis Club Bonnevoie, Luxembourg City, Luxembourg
5–7 May 1989
Hard (indoors)

Norway
2

			1	2	3	4	5
1	(Luxembourg) (Norway)	Johny Goudenbour; Christian Ruud	6; 3	2; 6	2; 6	5; 7
2	(Luxembourg) (Norway)	Serge Brueck; Bent-Ove Pedersen	7; 5	6; 4	6; 4
3	(Luxembourg) (Norway)	Serge Brueck / Johny Goudenbour; Bent-Ove Pedersen / John Erik Rustad	6; 2	6; 2	6; 2
4	(Luxembourg) (Norway)	Johny Goudenbour; Bent-Ove Pedersen	6; 1	6; 4	4; 6	3; 6	5; 7
5	(Luxembourg) (Norway)	Serge Brueck; Christian Ruud	6; 1	1; 6	6; 3	6; 3

=== Poland vs. Greece ===
Poland
2
Legia Warsaw, Warsaw, Poland
5–7 May 1989
Clay

Greece
3

			1	2	3	4	5
1	(Poland) (Greece)	Tomasz Iwański; George Kalovelonis	5; 7	4; 6	6^{3} 7^{7}
2	(Poland) (Greece)	Wojciech Kowalski; Ioannis Kabakoglou	6; 4	6; 2	7; 5
3	(Poland) (Greece)	Wojciech Kowalski / Lech Sidor; George Kalovelonis / Ioannis Rigas	4; 6	6; 3	5; 7	5; 7
4	(Poland) (Greece)	Wojciech Kowalski; George Kalovelonis	3; 6	4; 6	2; 6
5	(Poland) (Greece)	Tomasz Iwański; Ioannis Kabakoglou	6; 2	6; 1

=== Monaco vs. Bulgaria ===
Monaco
3
Tennis Club de Monaco, Monte Carlo, Monaco
12–14 May 1989
Clay

Bulgaria
1

			1	2	3	4	5
1	(Monaco) (Bulgaria)	Jérôme Seguin; Krassimir Lazarov	3; 6	5; 7	2; 6
2	(Monaco) (Bulgaria)	Gilles Ganancia; Ivan Keskinov	6; 2	6^{2} 7^{7}	7; 5	6; 3
3	(Monaco) (Bulgaria)	Christophe Boggetti / Jaques Vinciléoni; Krassimir Lazarov / Milen Velev	7^{7} 6^{2}	1; 6	3; 6	6; 1	8; 6
4	(Monaco) (Bulgaria)	Gilles Ganancia; Krassimir Lazarov	6; 3	7; 5	2; 6	4; 6	7; 5
5	(Monaco) (Bulgaria)	Jérôme Seguin; Ivan Keskinov	6; 4	5; 2				not completed

== Third round ==
=== Luxembourg vs. Belgium ===
Luxembourg
0
Tennis Club Bonnevoie, Luxembourg City, Luxembourg
16–18 June 1989
Hard (indoors)

Belgium
5

			1	2	3	4	5
1	(Luxembourg) (Belgium)	Johny Goudenbour; Xavier Daufresne	1; 6	7^{7} 6^{2}	6; 4	5; 7	0; 6
2	(Luxembourg) (Belgium)	Serge Brueck; Denis Langaskens	3; 6	6; 1	4; 6	2; 6
3	(Luxembourg) (Belgium)	Serge Brueck / Johny Goudenbour; Xavier Daufresne / Denis Langaskens	4; 6	6; 1	6; 1	3; 6	1; 6
4	(Luxembourg) (Belgium)	Serge Brueck; Xavier Daufresne	4; 6	5; 7
5	(Luxembourg) (Belgium)	Johny Goudenbour; Denis Langaskens	4; 6	3; 6

=== Greece vs. Monaco ===
Greece
3
Athens Lawn Tennis Club, Athens, Greece
15–17 June 1989
Clay

Monaco
2

			1	2	3	4	5
1	(Greece) (Monaco)	George Kalovelonis; Jérôme Seguin	4; 6	6^{3} 7^{7}	4; 6
2	(Greece) (Monaco)	Konstantinos Efraimoglou; Gilles Ganancia	6; 2	6; 2	6; 1
3	(Greece) (Monaco)	Konstantinos Efraimoglou / George Kalovelonis; Christophe Boggetti / Jaques Vinciléoni	6; 3	6; 4	7; 5
4	(Greece) (Monaco)	Konstantinos Efraimoglou; Jérôme Seguin	6; 4	6; 2	6; 0
5	(Greece) (Monaco)	George Kalovelonis; Gilles Ganancia	1; 6	1; 6

== Fourth round ==
=== Greece vs. Belgium ===
Greece
0
Filothei Tennis Club, Athens, Greece
21–23 July 1989
Clay

Belgium
5

			1	2	3	4	5
1	(Greece) (Belgium)	George Kalovelonis; Denis Langaskens	6; 2	6^{8} 7^{10}	0; 6	6^{3} 7^{7}
2	(Greece) (Belgium)	Konstantinos Efraimoglou; Bart Wuyts	2; 6	7; 5	2; 6	4; 6
3	(Greece) (Belgium)	Konstantinos Efraimoglou / George Kalovelonis; Xavier Daufresne / Denis Langaskens	5; 7	7^{7} 6^{5}	0; 6	5; 7
4	(Greece) (Belgium)	George Kalovelonis; Bart Wuyts	3; 6	6; 4	1; 6
5	(Greece) (Belgium)	Konstantinos Efraimoglou; Denis Langaskens	3; 6	2; 6
