= 1990 Davis Cup Europe Zone Group II =

International tennis competition

The Europe/Africa Zone was one of the three zones of the regional Davis Cup competition in 1990.

In the Europe/Africa Zone there were two different tiers, called groups, in which teams compete against each other to advance to the upper tier. The winner in the Europe Zone Group II advanced to the Europe/Africa Zone Group I in 1991.

== Participating nations ==
- Bulgaria
- Cyprus
- Greece
- Luxembourg
- Malta
- Monaco
- Norway
- Poland
- Turkey

=== Draw ===
First round 30 March–1 April
Greece
bye
Nicosia, Cyprus (clay)
Bulgaria	5
Cyprus	0
Luxembourg
bye
bye
Poland
Malta
bye
bye
Turkey
Norway
bye
bye
Monaco

Second Round; 4–6 May
Sofia, Bulgaria (clay)
Greece	0
Bulgaria	5
Luxembourg City, Luxembourg (indoor hard)
Luxembourg	1
Poland	4
İzmir, Turkey (clay)
Malta	2
Turkey	3
Monte Carlo, Monaco (clay)
Norway	4
Monaco	1

Third Round; 15–17 June
Warsaw, Poland (clay)
Bulgaria	1
Poland	4
İzmir, Turkey (clay)
Turkey	2
Norway	3

Third Round; 20–22 July
Warsaw, Poland (clay)
Poland	4
Norway	1

- Poland promoted to Group I in 1991.

== First round ==
=== Cyprus vs. Bulgaria ===
Cyprus
0
Field Club, Nicosia, Cyprus
30 March–1 April 1990
Clay

Bulgaria
5

			1	2	3	4	5
1	(Cyprus) (Bulgaria)	Yiannos Hadjigeorgiou; Ruslan Rainov	1; 6	2; 6	3; 6
2	(Cyprus) (Bulgaria)	Alkis Papamichael; Ivan Keskinov	4; 6	5; 7	1; 6
3	(Cyprus) (Bulgaria)	Yiannos Hadjigeorgiou / Neoclis Neocleous; Ivan Keskinov / Milen Velev	1; 6	1; 6	4; 6
4	(Cyprus) (Bulgaria)	Alkis Papamichael; Ruslan Rainov	3; 6	4; 6
5	(Cyprus) (Bulgaria)	Yiannos Hadjigeorgiou; Ivan Keskinov	1; 6	1; 6

== Second round ==
=== Bulgaria vs. Greece ===
Bulgaria
5
Tennis Club Akademik, Sofia, Bulgaria
4–6 May 1990
Clay

Greece
0

			1	2	3	4	5
1	(Bulgaria) (Greece)	Milen Velev; George Kalovelonis	6; 3	6; 4	6; 0
2	(Bulgaria) (Greece)	Ivan Keskinov; Konstantinos Efraimoglou	6; 3	7; 5	6; 1
3	(Bulgaria) (Greece)	Stefan Tzvetkov / Milen Velev; George Kalovelonis / Ioannis Rigas	6^{5} 7^{7}	1; 6	6; 2	6; 1	6; 3
4	(Bulgaria) (Greece)	Milen Velev; Konstantinos Efraimoglou	6; 2	7; 5
5	(Bulgaria) (Greece)	Ivan Keskinov; George Kalovelonis	6; 2	6; 3

=== Luxembourg vs. Poland ===
Luxembourg
1
Tennis Club Bonnevoie, Luxembourg City, Luxembourg
4–6 May 1990
Hard (indoors)

Poland
4

			1	2	3	4	5
1	(Luxembourg) (Poland)	Jacques Radoux; Tomasz Iwański	7^{13} 6^{11}	3; 6	6^{4} 7^{7}	6; 4	3; 6
2	(Luxembourg) (Poland)	Johny Goudenbour; Wojciech Kowalski	3; 6	4; 6	2; 6
3	(Luxembourg) (Poland)	Johny Goudenbour / Jacques Radoux; Wojciech Kowalski / Lech Sidor	6; 4	7^{7} 6^{4}	6; 1
4	(Luxembourg) (Poland)	Jacques Radoux; Wojciech Kowalski	1; 6	4; 6	3; 6
5	(Luxembourg) (Poland)	Johny Goudenbour; Tomasz Iwański	5; 7	4; 6

=== Turkey vs. Malta ===
Turkey
3
Kültürpark Tenis Kulübü, İzmir, Turkey
4–6 May 1990
Clay

Malta
2

			1	2	3	4	5
1	(Turkey) (Malta)	Alaaddin Karagöz; Gordon Asciak	6; 0	6; 1	6; 4
2	(Turkey) (Malta)	Mert Ertunga; Christopher Gatt	5; 7	3; 6	0; 6
3	(Turkey) (Malta)	Mert Ertunga / Alaaddin Karagöz; Gordon Asciak / Christopher Gatt	4; 6	4; 6	7; 5	4; 6
4	(Turkey) (Malta)	Alaaddin Karagöz; Christopher Gatt	6^{6} 7^{8}	7^{7} 6^{4}	6; 2	4; 6	8; 6
5	(Turkey) (Malta)	Mert Ertunga; Gordon Asciak	5; 7	6; 1	1; 6	6; 3	6; 2

=== Monaco vs. Norway ===
Monaco
1
Tennis Club de Monaco, Monte Carlo, Monaco
4–6 May 1990
Clay

Norway
4

			1	2	3	4	5
1	(Monaco) (Norway)	Jérôme Seguin; Anders Håseth	7^{7} 6^{1}	3; 6	4; 6	6; 3	2; 6
2	(Monaco) (Norway)	Gilles Ganancia; Christian Ruud	7; 5	3; 6	2; 6	2; 6
3	(Monaco) (Norway)	Christophe Boggetti / Jacques Vinciléoni; Anders Rolfsen / Christian Ruud	4; 6	7^{7} 6^{4}	7; 5	2; 6	0; 6
4	(Monaco) (Norway)	Jérôme Seguin; Christian Ruud	4; 6	6; 4	5; 7
5	(Monaco) (Norway)	Gilles Ganancia; Anders Håseth	6; 0	7; 5

== Third round ==
=== Poland vs. Bulgaria ===
Poland
4
Legia Warsaw, Warsaw, Poland
15–17 June 1990
Clay

Bulgaria
1

			1	2	3	4	5
1	(Poland) (Bulgaria)	Tomasz Iwański; Milen Velev	6; 3	6; 2	6; 3
2	(Poland) (Bulgaria)	Wojciech Kowalski; Ivan Keskinov	6; 3	6; 4	1; 6	7^{7} 6^{4}
3	(Poland) (Bulgaria)	Tomasz Iwański / Wojciech Kowalski; Stefan Tzvetkov / Milen Velev	3; 6	6; 4	6; 1	6; 2
4	(Poland) (Bulgaria)	Tomasz Iwański; Ivan Keskinov	6^{5} 7^{7}	2; 6
5	(Poland) (Bulgaria)	Wojciech Kowalski; Milen Velev	7^{7} 6^{3}	7; 5

=== Turkey vs. Norway ===
Turkey
2
Kültürpark Tenis Kulübü, İzmir, Turkey
15–17 June 1990
Clay

Norway
3

			1	2	3	4	5
1	(Turkey) (Norway)	Alaaddin Karagöz; Anders Håseth	6; 3	0; 6	6; 2	6; 4
2	(Turkey) (Norway)	Mert Ertunga; Bent-Ove Pedersen	2; 6	1; 6	1; 6
3	(Turkey) (Norway)	Mustafa Azkara / Alaaddin Karagöz; Bent-Ove Pedersen / Anders Rolfsen	6^{8} 7^{10}	6^{7} 7^{9}	1; 6
4	(Turkey) (Norway)	Mert Ertunga; Anders Håseth	0; 6	1; 6	3; 6
5	(Turkey) (Norway)	Alaaddin Karagöz; Arne Georg Raabe	6; 3	6; 4

== Fourth round ==
=== Poland vs. Norway ===
Poland
4
Legia Warsaw, Warsaw, Poland
20–22 July 1990
Clay

Norway
1

			1	2	3	4	5
1	(Poland) (Norway)	Wojciech Kowalski; Bent-Ove Pedersen	6^{4} 7^{7}	6; 0	6; 4	6; 4
2	(Poland) (Norway)	Tomasz Iwański; Christian Ruud	6; 2	6; 4	6; 3
3	(Poland) (Norway)	Wojciech Fibak / Wojciech Kowalski; Bent-Ove Pedersen / Anders Rolfsen	3; 6	6; 3	6^{2} 7^{7}	6; 2	4; 6
4	(Poland) (Norway)	Wojciech Kowalski; Christian Ruud	6; 3	6; 0	6; 0
5	(Poland) (Norway)	Tomasz Iwański; Bent-Ove Pedersen	1; 6	7^{7} 6^{4}	8; 6
