= 1992 Davis Cup Europe/Africa Zone Group II =

International tennis competition

The Europe/Africa Zone was one of the three zones of the regional Davis Cup competition in 1992.

In the Europe/Africa Zone there were three different tiers, called groups, in which teams competed against each other to advance to the upper tier. Winners in Group II advanced to the Europe/Africa Zone Group I. Teams who lost their respective ties competed in the relegation play-offs, with winning teams remaining in Group II, whereas teams who lost their play-offs were relegated to the Europe/Africa Zone Group III in 1993.

== Participating nations ==
- Bulgaria
- Cyprus
- Egypt
- Ghana
- Greece
- Ireland
- Ivory Coast
- Luxembourg
- Malta
- Monaco
- Morocco
- Nigeria
- Togo
- Turkey
- Zambia
- Zimbabwe

=== Draw ===
Relegation Play-offs
Galway, Ireland (carpet)
Ireland	5
Malta	0
Monte Carlo, Monaco (clay)
Monaco	5
Zambia	0
Accra, Ghana (hard)
Ghana	3
Togo	1
Turkey
Nigeria	w/o

First Round
Athens, Greece (clay)
Ireland	1
Greece	4
Sofia, Bulgaria (clay)
Malta	0
Bulgaria	5
Monte Carlo, Monaco (clay)
Luxembourg	4
Monaco	1
Cairo, Egypt (clay)
Zambia	2
Egypt	3
Harare, Zimbabwe (hard)
Zimbabwe	4
Ghana	1
Lomé, Togo (hard)
Togo	2
Ivory Coast	3
Cyprus	w/o
Turkey
Lagos, Nigeria (hard)
Nigeria	0
Morocco	5

Second Round
Athens, Greece (clay)
Greece	4
Bulgaria	1
Luxembourg City, Luxembourg (clay)
Luxembourg	3
Egypt	2
Abidjan, Ivory Coast (hard)
Zimbabwe	4
Ivory Coast	1
Nicosia, Cyprus (clay)
Cyprus	0
Morocco	5

Third Round
Luxembourg City, Lux. (indoor carpet)
Greece	0
Luxembourg	5
Harare, Zimbabwe (hard)
Zimbabwe	4
Morocco	1

- Malta, Zambia, Togo, and Turkey relegated to Group III in 1993.
- Luxembourg and Zimbabwe promoted to Group I in 1993.

== First round ==
=== Greece vs. Ireland ===
Greece
4
Olympic Stadium, Athens, Greece
1–3 May 1992
Clay

Ireland
1

			1	2	3	4	5
1	(Greece) (Republic of Ireland)	Anastasios Bavelas; Derek Farren	7^{8} 6^{6}	6; 1	5; 7	6; 2
2	(Greece) (Republic of Ireland)	Andreas Fikas; Owen Casey	6; 3	7; 5	5; 7	7^{7} 6^{2}
3	(Greece) (Republic of Ireland)	Anastasios Bavelas / Andreas Fikas; Eoin Collins / Peter Wright	3; 6	4; 6	6; 1	6; 4	6; 4
4	(Greece) (Republic of Ireland)	Anastasios Bavelas; Owen Casey	5; 7	2; 6
5	(Greece) (Republic of Ireland)	Andreas Fikas; Derek Farren	6; 4	6; 4

=== Bulgaria vs. Malta ===
Bulgaria
5
Levski Spartak Tennis Club, Sofia, Bulgaria
1–3 May 1992
Clay

Malta
0

			1	2	3	4	5
1	(Bulgaria) (Malta)	Ivan Keskinov; Gordon Asciak	6; 2	6; 1	6; 3
2	(Bulgaria) (Malta)	Milko Petkov; Christopher Gatt	6; 0	6; 3	7; 5
3	(Bulgaria) (Malta)	Ivan Keskinov / Mark Markov; Gordon Asciak / Christopher Gatt	3; 6	6; 2	6; 2	3; 6	6; 4
4	(Bulgaria) (Malta)	Ivan Keskinov; Christopher Gatt	6; 4	7^{11} 6^{9}
5	(Bulgaria) (Malta)	Milko Petkov; Gordon Asciak	6; 3	6; 4

=== Monaco vs. Luxembourg ===
Monaco
1
Tennis Club de Monaco, Monte Carlo, Monaco
1–3 May 1992
Clay

Luxembourg
4

			1	2	3	4	5
1	(Monaco) (Luxembourg)	Christophe Boggetti; Alberto Paris	3; 6	6; 4	3; 6	3; 6
2	(Monaco) (Luxembourg)	Jérôme Seguin; Johny Goudenbour	4; 6	5; 7	2; 6
3	(Monaco) (Luxembourg)	Christophe Boggetti / Jérôme Seguin; Johny Goudenbour / Alberto Paris	4; 6	4; 6	6^{8} 7^{10}
4	(Monaco) (Luxembourg)	Jérôme Seguin; Thierry Neiens	6; 3	6; 1
5	(Monaco) (Luxembourg)	Christophe Boggetti; Johny Goudenbour	5; 7	2; 6

=== Egypt vs. Zambia ===
Egypt
3
Gezira Sporting Club, Cairo, Egypt
1–3 May 1992
Clay

Zambia
2

			1	2	3	4	5
1	(Egypt) (Zambia)	Khaled El-Salawy; Dermot Sweeney	6; 3	6; 3	6; 4
2	(Egypt) (Zambia)	Amr Ghoneim; Fred Kangwa	6; 3	6; 2	7^{7} 6^{5}
3	(Egypt) (Zambia)	Khaled El-Salawy / Mohammed Eleish; Fred Kangwa / Niza Simunyola	6; 4	6; 4	1; 6	4; 6	2; 6
4	(Egypt) (Zambia)	Khaled El-Salawy; Fred Kangwa	6; 4	3; 6	6; 4	6; 1
5	(Egypt) (Zambia)	Amr Ghoneim; Dermot Sweeney	3; 6	4; 6	3; 6

=== Zimbabwe vs. Ghana ===
Zimbabwe
4
Harare Sports Club, Harare, Zimbabwe
1–3 May 1992
Hard

Ghana
1

			1	2	3	4	5
1	(Zimbabwe) (Ghana)	Byron Black; Mike Amoah	6; 2	6; 1	7; 5
2	(Zimbabwe) (Ghana)	Rashid Hassan; Franklyn Ofori	4; 6	3; 6	7^{7} 6^{2}	3; 6
3	(Zimbabwe) (Ghana)	Malcolm Birch / Byron Black; Mike Amoah / Franklyn Ofori	6; 4	6; 4	7^{7} 6^{1}
4	(Zimbabwe) (Ghana)	Byron Black; Franklyn Ofori	6; 2	6; 3	6; 3
5	(Zimbabwe) (Ghana)	Rashid Hassan; Mike Amoah	6; 3	6; 4

=== Togo vs. Ivory Coast ===
Togo
2
National Tennis Centre, Lomé, Togo
1–3 May 1992
Hard

Ivory Coast
3

			1	2	3	4	5
1	(Togo) (Ivory Coast)	Goudjo Gbedey; Ilou Lonfo	7^{7} 6^{2}	7^{7} 6^{1}	6; 4
2	(Togo) (Ivory Coast)	Kodjo Apeti; Clément N'Goran	2; 6	4; 6	4; 6
3	(Togo) (Ivory Coast)	Kodjo Apeti / Goudjo Gbedey; Claude N'Goran / Clément N'Goran	4; 6	2; 6	2; 6
4	(Togo) (Ivory Coast)	Goudjo Gbedey; Clément N'Goran	3; 6	4; 6	6; 2	7^{7} 6^{5}	6; 1
5	(Togo) (Ivory Coast)	Koko Kunkel; Ilou Lonfo	7; 5	2; 6	4; 6	7^{7} 6^{5}	1; 6

=== Nigeria vs. Morocco ===
Nigeria
0
National Stadium, Lagos, Nigeria
1–3 May 1992
Hard

Morocco
5

			1	2	3	4	5
1	(Nigeria) (Morocco)	Sule Ladipo; Mohammed Ridaoui	6; 2	2; 6	6; 1	4; 6	3; 6
2	(Nigeria) (Morocco)	Yakubu Suleiman; Karim Alami	3; 6	3; 6	6; 3	6^{6} 7^{8}
3	(Nigeria) (Morocco)	Sule Ladipo / Yakubu Suleiman; Karim Alami / Mohammed Ridaoui	6^{4} 7^{7}	3; 6	6^{6} 7^{8}
4	(Nigeria) (Morocco)	Sule Ladipo; Karim Alami	4; 6	3; 6
5	(Nigeria) (Morocco)	Yakubu Suleiman; Mohammed Ridaoui	7^{7} 6^{5}	3; 6	3; 6

== Second round ==
=== Greece vs. Bulgaria ===
Greece
4
Athens Lawn Tennis Club, Athens, Greece
17–19 July 1992
Clay

Bulgaria
1

			1	2	3	4	5
1	(Greece) (Bulgaria)	George Kalovelonis; Milko Petkov	3; 6	7; 5	6; 2	3; 6	7; 5
2	(Greece) (Bulgaria)	Anastasios Bavelas; Orlin Stanoytchev	6; 2	6; 1	6; 2
3	(Greece) (Bulgaria)	Anastasios Bavelas / Konstantinos Efraimoglou; Ivan Keskinov / Mark Markov	3; 6	6^{3} 7^{7}	7^{7} 6^{4}	6; 2	6; 4
4	(Greece) (Bulgaria)	Anastasios Bavelas; Milko Petkov	6; 1	6; 4
5	(Greece) (Bulgaria)	George Kalovelonis; Orlin Stanoytchev	3; 6	3; 6

=== Luxembourg vs. Egypt ===
Luxembourg
3
Tennis Club de Spora, Luxembourg City, Luxembourg
17–19 July 1992
Clay

Egypt
2

			1	2	3	4	5
1	(Luxembourg) (Egypt)	Serge Brueck; Amr Ghoneim	4; 6	7; 5	6; 3	6; 3
2	(Luxembourg) (Egypt)	Johny Goudenbour; Tamer El-Sawy	1; 6	6; 4	1; 6	1; 6
3	(Luxembourg) (Egypt)	Johny Goudenbour / Alberto Paris; Tamer El-Sawy / Adli El Shafei	6; 2	6; 3	7; 5
4	(Luxembourg) (Egypt)	Johny Goudenbour; Amr Ghoneim	6; 3	7^{7} 6^{5}	6; 1
5	(Luxembourg) (Egypt)	Serge Brueck; Tamer El-Sawy	3; 6	1; 3				retired

=== Ivory Coast vs. Zimbabwe ===
Ivory Coast
1
Hôtel Ivoire, Abidjan, Ivory Coast
17–19 July 1992
Hard

Zimbabwe
4

			1	2	3	4	5
1	(Ivory Coast) (Zimbabwe)	Émile N'Goran; Byron Black	2; 6	3; 6	2; 6
2	(Ivory Coast) (Zimbabwe)	Ilou Lonfo; Wayne Black	7^{8} 6^{6}	1; 6	6^{7} 7^{9}	4; 6
3	(Ivory Coast) (Zimbabwe)	Ilou Lonfo / Émile N'Goran; Malcolm Birch / Byron Black	4; 6	7^{7} 6^{5}	7^{7} 6^{5}	3; 6	4; 6
4	(Ivory Coast) (Zimbabwe)	Ilou Lonfo; Byron Black	4; 6	4; 6
5	(Ivory Coast) (Zimbabwe)	Émile N'Goran; Rashid Hassan	7; 5	7^{8} 6^{6}

=== Cyprus vs. Morocco ===
Cyprus
0
Field Club, Nicosia, Cyprus
17–19 July 1992
Clay

Morocco
5

			1	2	3	4	5
1	(Cyprus) (Morocco)	Alkis Papamichael; Mohammed Ridaoui	1; 6	2; 6	0; 6
2	(Cyprus) (Morocco)	Yiannos Hadjigeorgiou; Younes El Aynaoui	2; 6	3; 6	0; 6
3	(Cyprus) (Morocco)	Loucas Christophides / Yiannos Hadjigeorgiou; Salahaddine Adbib / Arafat Chekrouni	3; 6	4; 6	3; 6
4	(Cyprus) (Morocco)	Alkis Papamichael; Arafat Chekrouni	0; 6	6^{2} 7^{7}
5	(Cyprus) (Morocco)	Loucas Christophides; Mohammed Ridaoui	1; 6	1; 6

== Relegation play-offs ==
=== Ireland vs. Malta ===
Ireland
5
Galway Tennis Club, Galway, Ireland
17–19 July 1992
Carpet

Malta
0

			1	2	3	4	5
1	(Republic of Ireland) (Malta)	Eoin Collins; Christopher Gatt	6; 1	6; 2	6; 0
2	(Republic of Ireland) (Malta)	Owen Casey; Gordon Asciak	6; 1	6; 1	6; 2
3	(Republic of Ireland) (Malta)	Owen Casey / Peter Wright; Gordon Asciak / Christopher Gatt	6; 1	7^{8} 6^{6}	6; 4
4	(Republic of Ireland) (Malta)	Owen Casey; Christopher Gatt	6; 4	6; 3
5	(Republic of Ireland) (Malta)	Eoin Collins; Gordon Asciak	6; 2	6; 3

=== Monaco vs. Zambia ===
Monaco
5
Tennis Club de Monaco, Monte Carlo, Monaco
17–19 July 1992
Clay

Zambia
0

			1	2	3	4	5
1	(Monaco) (Zambia)	Christophe Boggetti; Teza Simunyola	6; 4	6; 4	6; 2
2	(Monaco) (Zambia)	Jérôme Seguin; Dermot Sweeney	6; 1	6; 2	6; 1
3	(Monaco) (Zambia)	Jérôme Seguin / Jacques Vinciléoni; Stephen Kangwa / Niza Simunyola	6; 4	6; 1	6; 3
4	(Monaco) (Zambia)	Christophe Boggetti; Dermot Sweeney	6; 3	6; 3
5	(Monaco) (Zambia)	Jérôme Seguin; Teza Simunyola	6; 2	6; 4

=== Ghana vs. Togo ===
Ghana
3
Accra Sports Stadium, Accra, Ghana
17–19 July 1992
Hard

Togo
1

			1	2	3	4	5
1	(Ghana) (Togo)	Franklyn Ofori; Midodji Segbeaya	6; 3	6; 4	6; 4
2	(Ghana) (Togo)	Mike Amoah; Goudjo Gbedey	6^{4} 7^{7}	1; 6	0; 6
3	(Ghana) (Togo)	Franklyn Ofori / Emmanuel Paddi; Goudjo Gbedey / Midodji Segbeaya	6; 3	6; 3	6; 3
4	(Ghana) (Togo)	Franklyn Ofori; Goudjo Gbedey	7^{7} 6^{4}	7^{7} 6^{5}	6; 2
5	(Ghana) (Togo)	Mike Amoah; Midodji Segbeaya						not played

== Third round ==
=== Luxembourg vs. Greece ===
Luxembourg
5
Tennis Club Bonnevoie, Luxembourg City, Luxembourg
25–27 September 1992
Carpet (indoors)

Greece
0

			1	2	3	4	5
1	(Luxembourg) (Greece)	Jacques Radoux; Andreas Fikas	6; 2	6; 0	7; 5
2	(Luxembourg) (Greece)	Serge Brueck; Anastasios Bavelas	7; 5	7; 5	6; 2
3	(Luxembourg) (Greece)	Johny Goudenbour / Alberto Paris; Anastasios Bavelas / Konstantinos Efraimoglou	6; 3	6; 1	7^{7} 6^{3}
4	(Luxembourg) (Greece)	Jacques Radoux; Anastasios Bavelas	6; 1	7; 5
5	(Luxembourg) (Greece)	Serge Brueck; Andreas Fikas	7; 5	6; 4

=== Zimbabwe vs. Morocco ===
Zimbabwe
4
Harare Sports Club, Harare, Zimbabwe
25–27 September 1992
Hard

Morocco
1

			1	2	3	4	5
1	(Zimbabwe) (Morocco)	Wayne Black; Younes El Aynaoui	3; 6	6; 3	3; 6	7; 5	4; 6
2	(Zimbabwe) (Morocco)	Byron Black; Mohammed Ridaoui	6; 3	6; 2	6; 2
3	(Zimbabwe) (Morocco)	Byron Black / Wayne Black; Younes El Aynaoui / Mohammed Ridaoui	6; 1	6; 3	6; 1
4	(Zimbabwe) (Morocco)	Byron Black; Salahaddine Adbib	6; 1	6; 2	6; 2
5	(Zimbabwe) (Morocco)	Wayne Black; Mohammed Ridaoui	6; 0	6; 4
