= 1988 Davis Cup Europe Zone Group II =

International tennis competition

The Europe/Africa Zone is one of the three zones of the regional Davis Cup competition in 1988.

In the Europe/Africa Zone there are two different tiers, called groups, in which teams compete against each other to advance to the upper tier. Winners in the Europe Zone Group II advance to the Europe/Africa Zone Group I in 1989.

== Participating nations ==
- Cyprus
- Greece
- Ireland
- Luxembourg
- Malta
- Monaco
- Norway
- Poland
- Turkey

=== Draw ===
First round 8–10 April
Poland
bye
bye
Luxembourg
Greece
bye
bye
Turkey
Stavanger, Norway (indoor hard)
Malta	0
Norway	5
bye
Monaco
Cyprus
bye
bye
Ireland

Second Round; 6–8 May
Warsaw, Poland (clay)
Poland	5
Luxembourg	0
Athens, Greece (clay)
Greece	4
Turkey	1
Bergen, Norway (indoor carpet)
Norway	4
Monaco	1
Cork, Ireland (indoor carpet)
Cyprus	0
Ireland	5

Third Round; 10–12 June
Athens, Greece (clay)
Poland	1
Greece	3
Belfast, Northern Ireland (grass)
Norway	2
Ireland	3

Third Round; 22–24 July
Dublin, Ireland (grass)
Greece	0
Ireland	5

- Ireland are promoted to Group I in 1989.

== First round ==
=== Norway vs. Malta ===
Norway
5
Stavanger, Norway
8–10 April 1988
Hard (indoors)

Malta
0

			1	2	3	4	5
1	(Norway) (Malta)	Bent-Ove Pedersen; Gordon Asciak	6; 3	6; 4	6; 1
2	(Norway) (Malta)	Audun Jensen; Daryl Delicata	6; 0	6; 4	6; 1
3	(Norway) (Malta)	Audun Jensen / John Erik Rustad; Gordon Asciak / Daryl Delicata	4; 6	6; 4	4; 6	6; 2	6; 0
4	(Norway) (Malta)	Audun Jensen; Gordon Asciak	6; 1	6; 1
5	(Norway) (Malta)	Bent-Ove Pedersen; Daryl Delicata	6; 1	6; 1

== Second round ==
=== Poland vs. Luxembourg ===
Poland
5
Warsaw, Poland
6–8 May 1988
Clay

Luxembourg
0

			1	2	3	4	5
1	(Poland) (Luxembourg)	Wojciech Kowalski; Johny Goudenbour	3; 6	4; 6	6; 3	6; 3	6; 0
2	(Poland) (Luxembourg)	Lech Sidor; Mike van Kauvenbergh	6; 4	3; 6	1; 6	6; 3	6; 0
3	(Poland) (Luxembourg)	Wojciech Kowalski / Tomasz Maliszewski; Serge Brueck / Johny Goudenbour	6; 4	8; 10	7; 5	6; 2
4	(Poland) (Luxembourg)	Wojciech Kowalski; Mike van Kauvenbergh	6; 2	6; 2
5	(Poland) (Luxembourg)	Lech Sidor; Johny Goudenbour	0; 6	6; 4	6; 3

=== Greece vs. Turkey ===
Greece
4
Athens, Greece
6–8 May 1988
Clay

Turkey
1

			1	2	3	4	5
1	(Greece) (Turkey)	Ioannis Rigas; Alaaddin Karagöz	6; 2	6; 1	6; 1
2	(Greece) (Turkey)	George Kalovelonis; Yavuz Erkangil	6; 1	6; 4	7; 5
3	(Greece) (Turkey)	George Kalovelonis / Ioannis Rigas; Atlihan Binoz / Alaaddin Karagöz	7; 5	6; 4	6; 0
4	(Greece) (Turkey)	George Kalovelonis; Alaaddin Karagöz	5; 7	6; 3	5; 7
5	(Greece) (Turkey)	Ioannis Rigas; Yavuz Erkangil	6; 2	6; 1

=== Norway vs. Monaco ===
Norway
4
Bergen, Norway
6–8 May 1988
Carpet (indoors)

Monaco
1

			1	2	3	4	5
1	(Norway) (Monaco)	Bent-Ove Pedersen; Jacques Vinciléoni	3; 6	6; 3	6; 2	6; 2
2	(Norway) (Monaco)	John Erik Rustad; Bernard Balleret	1; 6	2; 6	6; 4	6; 2	4; 6
3	(Norway) (Monaco)	Audun Jensen / John Erik Rustad; Bernard Balleret / Jacques Vinciléoni	2; 6	6; 3	6; 2	17; 15
4	(Norway) (Monaco)	Bent-Ove Pedersen; Bernard Balleret	6; 1	6; 2	6; 3
5	(Norway) (Monaco)	John Erik Rustad; Jacques Vinciléoni	4; 6	7; 5	6; 3

=== Ireland vs. Cyprus ===
Ireland
5
Cork, Ireland
6–8 May 1988
Carpet (indoors)

Cyprus
0

			1	2	3	4	5
1	(Republic of Ireland) (Cyprus)	Peter Wright; Alkis Papamichael	6; 3	6; 3	6; 4
2	(Republic of Ireland) (Cyprus)	Robert Dolan; Yiannos Hadjigeorgiou	8; 6	6; 3	6; 4
3	(Republic of Ireland) (Cyprus)	Sean Molloy / Peter Wright; Yiannos Hadjigeorgiou / Phivos Zachariades	6; 1	6; 2	6; 0
4	(Republic of Ireland) (Cyprus)	Peter Wright; Yiannos Hadjigeorgiou	9; 7	10; 8
5	(Republic of Ireland) (Cyprus)	Robert Dolan; Alkis Papamichael	6; 4	3; 6	7; 5

== Third round ==
=== Greece vs. Poland ===
Greece
3
Athens, Greece
10–12 June 1988
Clay

Poland
1

			1	2	3	4	5
1	(Greece) (Poland)	George Kalovelonis; Lech Sidor	6; 2	6; 8	4; 6	6; 2	6; 2
2	(Greece) (Poland)	Anastasios Bavelas; Wojciech Kowalski	6; 4	3; 6	6; 3	3; 6	6; 4
3	(Greece) (Poland)	Konstantinos Efraimoglou / George Kalovelonis; Wojciech Kowalski / Lech Sidor	7; 9	11; 13	13; 15
4	(Greece) (Poland)	George Kalovelonis; Wojciech Kowalski	7; 5	9; 11	3; 6	6; 4	6; 0
5	(Greece) (Poland)	Anastasios Bavelas; Lech Sidor	10; 9					not completed

=== Ireland vs. Norway ===
Ireland
3
Belfast, Northern Ireland
10–12 June 1988
Grass

Norway
2

			1	2	3	4	5
1	(Republic of Ireland) (Norway)	Peter Wright; Bent-Ove Pedersen	9; 11	6; 4	4; 6	3; 6
2	(Republic of Ireland) (Norway)	Matt Doyle; John Erik Rustad	7; 5	7; 5	10; 8
3	(Republic of Ireland) (Norway)	Matt Doyle / Peter Wright; Audun Jensen / Bent-Ove Pedersen	4; 6	6; 4	6; 3	3; 6	6; 4
4	(Republic of Ireland) (Norway)	Matt Doyle; Bent-Ove Pedersen	6; 8	4; 6	3; 6
5	(Republic of Ireland) (Norway)	Peter Wright; Audun Jensen	6; 1	6; 4	6; 2

== Fourth round ==
=== Ireland vs. Greece ===
Ireland
5
Dublin, Ireland
22–24 July 1988
Grass

Greece
0

			1	2	3	4	5
1	(Republic of Ireland) (Greece)	Matt Doyle; Anastasios Bavelas	6; 2	6; 2	7; 5
2	(Republic of Ireland) (Greece)	Owen Casey; George Kalovelonis	5; 7	7; 5	6; 3	4; 6	6; 3
3	(Republic of Ireland) (Greece)	Matt Doyle / Peter Wright; Konstantinos Efraimoglou / George Kalovelonis	9; 7	14; 12	6; 1
4	(Republic of Ireland) (Greece)	Eoin Collins; George Kalovelonis	6; 2	6; 3
5	(Republic of Ireland) (Greece)	Owen Casey; Anastasios Bavelas	6; 1	6; 1
