= 1990 Davis Cup Africa Zone Group II =

International tennis competition

The Europe/Africa Zone was one of the three zones of the regional Davis Cup competition in 1990.

In the Europe/Africa Zone there were two different tiers, called groups, in which teams competed against each other to advance to the upper tier. The winner in the Africa Zone Group II advanced to the Europe/Africa Zone Group I in 1991.

== Participating nations ==
- Algeria
- Cameroon
- Egypt
- Ivory Coast
- Kenya
- Libya
- Morocco
- Senegal
- Togo
- Zambia
- Zimbabwe

=== Draw ===
First round 1–4 February
Senegal
bye
Togo	w/o
Libya
Morocco
bye
Algiers, Algeria (clay)
Algeria	1
Egypt	4
Abidjan, Ivory Coast (hard)
Kenya	1
Ivory Coast	4
bye
Cameroon
Zambia
bye
bye
Zimbabwe

Second Round; 23 March–1 April
Lomé, Togo (hard)
Senegal	0
Togo	5
Cairo, Egypt (clay)
Morocco	5
Egypt	0
Abidjan, Ivory Coast (hard)
Ivory Coast	5
Cameroon	0
Lusaka, Zambia (hard)
Zambia	1
Zimbabwe	4

Third Round; 15–17 June
Casablanca, Morocco (clay)
Togo	0
Morocco	5
Harare, Zimbabwe (indoor hard)
Ivory Coast	0
Zimbabwe	5

Third Round; 20–22 July
Casablanca, Morocco (clay)
Morocco	4
Zimbabwe	1

- Morocco promoted to Group I in 1991.

== First round ==
=== Algeria vs. Egypt ===
Algeria
1
Hydra Athletic Club, Algiers, Algeria
1–3 February 1990
Clay

Egypt
4

			1	2	3	4	5
1	(Algeria) (Egypt)	Reda Galou; Ahmed El-Mehelmy	4; 6	7; 5	7^{7} 6^{3}	1; 6	6; 4
2	(Algeria) (Egypt)	Moncef Zehar; Tamer El-Sawy	3; 6	7^{7} 6^{2}	6^{1} 7^{7}	1; 6
3	(Algeria) (Egypt)	Reda Galou / Moncef Zehar; Hassan El-Aroussy / Tamer El-Sawy	6^{5} 7^{7}	2; 6	6^{5} 7^{7}
4	(Algeria) (Egypt)	Reda Galou; Tamer El-Sawy	1; 6	3; 6	1; 6
5	(Algeria) (Egypt)	Abdelhak Hameurlaine; Khaled El-Salawy	5; 7	6; 3	2; 6	4; 6

=== Ivory Coast vs. Kenya ===
Ivory Coast
4
Hôtel Ivoire, Abidjan, Ivory Coast
2–4 February 1990
Hard

Kenya
1

			1	2	3	4	5
1	(Ivory Coast) (Kenya)	Clément N'Goran; Eno Polo	6; 4	6; 3	6; 2
2	(Ivory Coast) (Kenya)	Jean-Christophe Nabi; Kush Bhardwaj	6; 3	6; 2	6; 2
3	(Ivory Coast) (Kenya)	Clément N'Goran / Émile N'Goran; Kush Bhardwaj / Norbert Oduor	6; 1	6; 3	6; 4
4	(Ivory Coast) (Kenya)	Clément N'Goran; Kush Bhardwaj	7; 5	6; 2
5	(Ivory Coast) (Kenya)	Jean-Christophe Nabi; Eno Polo	4; 6	5; 7

== Second round ==
=== Togo vs. Senegal ===
Togo
5
Sarakawa Hotel, Lomé, Togo
30 March–1 April 1990
Hard

Senegal
0

			1	2	3	4	5
1	(Togo) (Senegal)	Goudjo Gbedey; Nagy Kabaz	6; 2	6; 2	6; 2
2	(Togo) (Senegal)	Midodji Segbeaya; Abou Berthé	6; 3	6; 3	6; 2
3	(Togo) (Senegal)	Goudjo Gbedey / Midodji Segbeaya; Abou Berthé / Fadel Berthé	6; 3	6^{3} 7^{7}	5; 7	6; 4	7; 5
4	(Togo) (Senegal)	Midodji Segbeaya; Nagy Kabaz	6; 1	6; 2
5	(Togo) (Senegal)	Goudjo Gbedey; Abou Berthé	6; 1	6; 2

=== Egypt vs. Morocco ===
Egypt
0
Gezira Sporting Club, Cairo, Egypt
23–25 March 1990
Clay

Morocco
5

			1	2	3	4	5
1	(Egypt) (Morocco)	Tamer El-Sawy; Khalid Outaleb	5; 7	4; 6	1; 6
2	(Egypt) (Morocco)	Ahmed El-Mehelmy; Karim Alami	4; 6	6; 1	3; 6	7^{7} 6^{4}	3; 6
3	(Egypt) (Morocco)	Ahmed El-Mehelmy / Tamer El-Sawy; Karim Alami / Khalid Outaleb	7^{7} 6^{4}	6^{5} 7^{7}	3; 6	4; 6
4	(Egypt) (Morocco)	Khaled El-Salawy; Mohammed Ridaoui	2; 6	1; 6
5	(Egypt) (Morocco)	Tamer El-Sawy; Karim Alami	6; 4	4; 6	5; 7

=== Ivory Coast vs. Cameroon ===
Ivory Coast
5
Hôtel Ivoire, Abidjan, Ivory Coast
30 March–1 April 1990
Hard

Cameroon
0

			1	2	3	4	5
1	(Ivory Coast) (Cameroon)	Jean-Jacques Kouassi; Yann Auzoux	6; 2	6; 1	6; 2
2	(Ivory Coast) (Cameroon)	Clément N'Goran; Lionel Kemajou	6; 2	6; 0	6; 0
3	(Ivory Coast) (Cameroon)	Claude N'Goran / Émile N'Goran; Yann Auzoux / Jules Ekono	6; 3	6; 3	4; 6	6; 3
4	(Ivory Coast) (Cameroon)	Clément N'Goran; Yann Auzoux	6; 1	6; 2
5	(Ivory Coast) (Cameroon)	Jean-Jacques Kouassi; Joseph Oyebog	6; 2	6; 1

=== Zambia vs. Zimbabwe ===
Zambia
1
InterContinental Hotel, Lusaka, Zambia
30 March–1 April 1990
Hard

Zimbabwe
4

			1	2	3	4	5
1	(Zambia) (Zimbabwe)	Stephen Kangwa; Greig Rodger	2; 6	6; 3	6; 3	4; 6	3; 6
2	(Zambia) (Zimbabwe)	Fred Kangwa; Garth Thomson	6; 3	3; 6	6; 4	6; 3
3	(Zambia) (Zimbabwe)	Fred Kangwa / Teza Simunyola; Malcolm Birch / Martin Lock	2; 6	3; 6	6^{4} 7^{7}
4	(Zambia) (Zimbabwe)	Fred Kangwa; Greig Rodger	6^{4} 7^{7}	6^{3} 7^{7}	6^{5} 7^{7}
5	(Zambia) (Zimbabwe)	Stephen Kangwa; Garth Thomson	4; 6	3; 6

== Third round ==
=== Morocco vs. Togo ===
Morocco
5
Olympic Club, Casablanca, Morocco
15–17 June 1990
Clay

Togo
0

			1	2	3	4	5
1	(Morocco) (Togo)	Mohammed Ridaoui; Goudjo Gbedey	6; 2	6; 1	3; 6	6; 4
2	(Morocco) (Togo)	Khalid Outaleb; Midodji Segbeaya	7^{7} 6^{2}	3; 6	6; 1	6; 4
3	(Morocco) (Togo)	Khalid Outaleb / Mohammed Ridaoui; Goudjo Gbedey / Midodji Segbeaya	6; 1	6; 0	1; 6	6; 0
4	(Morocco) (Togo)	Mohammed Ridaoui; Midodji Segbeaya	6^{8} 7^{10}	6; 3	6; 2
5	(Morocco) (Togo)	Khalid Outaleb; Goudjo Gbedey	6; 0	6; 1

=== Zimbabwe vs. Ivory Coast ===
Zimbabwe
5
City Sports Centre, Harare, Zimbabwe
15–17 June 1990
Hard (indoors)

Ivory Coast
0

			1	2	3	4	5
1	(Zimbabwe) (Ivory Coast)	Orlando Lourenco; Jean-Christophe Nabi	6; 2	6; 2	4; 6	2; 6	7; 5
2	(Zimbabwe) (Ivory Coast)	Byron Black; Émile N'Goran	6; 0	6; 2	6; 1
3	(Zimbabwe) (Ivory Coast)	Byron Black / Greig Rodger; Ilou Lonfo / Émile N'Goran	6; 3	6; 3	6; 0
4	(Zimbabwe) (Ivory Coast)	Clive Wilson; Émile N'Goran	6; 2	6; 3
5	(Zimbabwe) (Ivory Coast)	Byron Black; Ilou Lonfo	6; 1	6; 0

== Fourth round ==
=== Morocco vs. Zimbabwe ===
Morocco
4
Olympic Club, Casablanca, Morocco
20–22 July 1990
Clay

Zimbabwe
1

			1	2	3	4	5
1	(Morocco) (Zimbabwe)	Karim Alami; Orlando Lourenco	2; 6	6; 1	6; 3	7; 5
2	(Morocco) (Zimbabwe)	Khalid Outaleb; Byron Black	6; 2	5; 7	2; 6	2; 6
3	(Morocco) (Zimbabwe)	Karim Alami / Mohammed Ridaoui; Byron Black / Orlando Lourenco	6; 4	6; 4	7^{7} 6^{1}
4	(Morocco) (Zimbabwe)	Younes El Aynaoui; Orlando Lourenco	6; 1	6; 4	7; 5
5	(Morocco) (Zimbabwe)	Karim Alami; Byron Black	7^{7} 6^{1}	6; 3
