= 1991 Davis Cup Africa Zone Group II =

International tennis competition

The Europe/Africa Zone was one of the three zones of the regional Davis Cup competition in 1991.

In the Europe/Africa Zone there were two different tiers, called groups, in which teams competed against each other to advance to the upper tier. The winner in the Africa Zone Group II advanced to the Europe/Africa Zone Group I in 1992.

== Participating nations ==
- Algeria
- Cameroon
- Congo
- Egypt
- Ghana
- Ivory Coast
- Kenya
- Nigeria
- Senegal
- Togo
- Zambia
- Zimbabwe

=== Draw ===
First round 1–3 February; 3–10 May
Nigeria
bye
Ndola, Zambia (clay)
Zambia	3
Cameroon	2
Zimbabwe
bye
Nairobi, Kenya (clay)
Kenya	5
Congo	0
Algiers, Algeria (clay)
Algeria	2
Ivory Coast	3
bye
Togo
Cairo, Egypt (clay)
Senegal	2
Egypt	3
bye
Ghana

Second Round; 29 March–7 April; 14–16 June
Ndola, Zambia (clay)
Nigeria	3
Zambia	2
Harare, Zimbabwe (indoor hard)
Zimbabwe	1
Kenya	4
Abidjan, Ivory Coast (indoor carpet)
Ivory Coast	5
Togo	0
Cairo, Egypt (clay)
Egypt	5
Ghana	0

Third Round; 19–28 July
Nairobi, Kenya (clay)
Nigeria	2
Kenya	3
Abidjan, Ivory Coast (hard)
Ivory Coast	4
Egypt	1

Third Round; 13–15 September
Nairobi, Kenya (clay)
Kenya	4
Ivory Coast	1

- Kenya promoted to Group I in 1992.

== First round ==
=== Zambia vs. Cameroon ===
Zambia
3
Ndola Tennis Club, Ndola, Zambia
1–3 February 1991
Clay

Cameroon
2

			1	2	3	4	5
1	(Zambia) (Cameroon)	Fred Kangwa; Lionel Kemajou	2; 6	6; 3	6; 2	6; 2
2	(Zambia) (Cameroon)	Stephen Kangwa; Luc Ondobo	6; 2	2; 6	6; 0	6; 3
3	(Zambia) (Cameroon)	Fred Kangwa / Niza Simunyola; Lionel Kemajou / Angelin Mvogo	6; 4	1; 6	4; 6	6; 3	10; 12
4	(Zambia) (Cameroon)	Stephen Kangwa; Lionel Kemajou	2; 6	4; 6	6; 2	1; 6
5	(Zambia) (Cameroon)	Fred Kangwa; Luc Ondobo	6; 4	6; 4	4; 6	6; 1

=== Kenya vs. Congo ===
Kenya
5
Nairobi Club Ground, Nairobi, Kenya
1–3 February 1991
Clay

Congo
0

			1	2	3	4	5
1	(Kenya) (Republic of the Congo)	Eno Polo; Crépin Ossombi	6; 1	6; 2	6; 0
2	(Kenya) (Republic of the Congo)	Kush Bhardwaj; Christian Bemba	6; 0	6; 2	6; 4
3	(Kenya) (Republic of the Congo)	Norbert Oduor / Eno Polo; Christian Bemba / Crépin Ossombi	6; 2	6; 1	6; 0
4	(Kenya) (Republic of the Congo)	Norbert Oduor; Christian Bemba	6; 4	6; 4
5	(Kenya) (Republic of the Congo)	Kush Bhardwaj; Crépin Ossombi	6; 1	6; 2

=== Algeria vs. Ivory Coast ===
Algeria
2
Tennis Club Bachdjarah, Algiers, Algeria
8–10 May 1991
Clay

Ivory Coast
3

			1	2	3	4	5
1	(Algeria) (Ivory Coast)	Mehdi Ben Yebka; Clément N'Goran	3; 6	5; 7	4; 6
2	(Algeria) (Ivory Coast)	Abdelhak Hameurlaine; Jean-Christophe Nabi	5; 7	7^{7} 6^{4}	6; 2	6; 1
3	(Algeria) (Ivory Coast)	Mehdi Ben Yebka / Samir Tounsi; Clément N'Goran / Émile N'Goran	1; 6	6; 2	4; 6	6^{9} 7^{11}
4	(Algeria) (Ivory Coast)	Abdelhak Hameurlaine; Clément N'Goran	1; 6	3; 6	6^{3} 7^{7}
5	(Algeria) (Ivory Coast)	Mehdi Ben Yebka; Jean-Christophe Nabi	6; 3	6; 1

=== Egypt vs. Senegal ===
Egypt
3
Gezira Sporting Club, Cairo, Egypt
3–5 May 1991
Clay

Senegal
2

			1	2	3	4	5
1	(Egypt) (Senegal)	Hassan El-Aroussy; Abou Berthé	6; 3	6; 2	7^{7} 6^{4}
2	(Egypt) (Senegal)	Tamer El-Sawy; Fadel Berthé	5; 7	6; 1	6; 1	6; 2
3	(Egypt) (Senegal)	Tamer El-Sawy / Hani Nasser; Abou Berthé / Fadel Berthé	7; 5	6^{4} 7^{7}	2; 6	7^{7} 6^{4}	4; 6
4	(Egypt) (Senegal)	Tamer El-Sawy; Abou Berthé	6; 0	6; 2	6; 0
5	(Egypt) (Senegal)	Hassan El-Aroussy; Fadel Berthé	6; 1	3; 6	6; 3	2; 6	3; 6

== Second round ==
=== Zambia vs. Nigeria ===
Zambia
2
Ndola Tennis Club, Ndola, Zambia
29–31 March 1991
Clay

Nigeria
3

			1	2	3	4	5
1	(Zambia) (Nigeria)	Fred Kangwa; Kyrian Nwokedi	7; 5	7^{7} 6^{3}	3; 6	7^{7} 6^{3}
2	(Zambia) (Nigeria)	Stephen Kangwa; Nduka Odizor	4; 2					retired
3	(Zambia) (Nigeria)	Fred Kangwa / Dermot Sweeney; Kyrian Nwokedi / Nduka Odizor	3; 6	6^{3} 7^{7}	7^{7} 6^{4}	4; 6
4	(Zambia) (Nigeria)	Fred Kangwa; Nduka Odizor	4; 6	2; 6	2; 6
5	(Zambia) (Nigeria)	Dermot Sweeney; Kyrian Nwokedi	7^{7} 6^{4}	6; 2

=== Zimbabwe vs. Kenya ===
Zimbabwe
1
City Sports Centre, Harare, Zimbabwe
5–7 April 1991
Hard (indoors)

Kenya
4

			1	2	3	4	5
1	(Zimbabwe) (Kenya)	Greig Rodger; Eno Polo	6; 4	3; 6	4; 6	6^{4} 7^{7}
2	(Zimbabwe) (Kenya)	Garth Thomson; Paul Wekesa	0; 6	0; 6	1; 6
3	(Zimbabwe) (Kenya)	Malcolm Birch / Greig Rodger; Eno Polo / Paul Wekesa	4; 6	4; 6	2; 6
4	(Zimbabwe) (Kenya)	Greig Rodger; Paul Wekesa	2; 6	4; 6
5	(Zimbabwe) (Kenya)	Garth Thomson; Eno Polo	3; 6	7^{10} 6^{8}	6; 3

=== Ivory Coast vs. Togo ===
Ivory Coast
5
Hôtel Ivoire, Abidjan, Ivory Coast
14–16 June 1991
Carpet (indoors)

Togo
0

			1	2	3	4	5
1	(Ivory Coast) (Togo)	Jean-Christophe Nabi; Katore Agnamba	6; 0	6; 0	6; 3
2	(Ivory Coast) (Togo)	Émile N'Goran; Kodjo Apeti	6; 2	6; 1	6; 0
3	(Ivory Coast) (Togo)	Ilou Lonfo / Émile N'Goran; Katore Agnamba / Kodjo Apeti	6; 2	6; 2	6^{4} 7^{7}	6; 1
4	(Ivory Coast) (Togo)	Jean-Christophe Nabi; Kodjo Apeti	3; 6	6; 1	7; 5
5	(Ivory Coast) (Togo)	Ilou Lonfo; Mensah Gbeboume	6; 0	6; 2

=== Egypt vs. Ghana ===
Egypt
5
Gezira Sporting Club, Cairo, Egypt
14–16 June 1991
Clay

Ghana
0

			1	2	3	4	5
1	(Egypt) (Ghana)	Tamer El-Sawy; Mike Amoah	6; 1	6; 0	6; 2
2	(Egypt) (Ghana)	Hassan El-Aroussy; Franklyn Ofori	6^{5} 7^{7}	7^{7} 6^{5}	2; 0			retired
3	(Egypt) (Ghana)	Hassan El-Aroussy / Tamer El-Sawy; Kojo Atiso / Kenneth Dowuona	6; 4	6; 2	6; 2
4	(Egypt) (Ghana)	Amr Ghoneim; Kojo Atiso	7^{7} 6^{4}	7; 5
5	(Egypt) (Ghana)	Hassan El-Aroussy; Mike Amoah	6^{5} 7^{7}	7^{7} 6^{4}	8; 6

== Third round ==
=== Kenya vs. Nigeria ===
Kenya
3
Nairobi Club Ground, Nairobi, Kenya
19–21 July 1991
Clay

Nigeria
2

			1	2	3	4	5
1	(Kenya) (Nigeria)	Eno Polo; Nduka Odizor	6; 4	1; 6	2; 6	6; 1	4; 6
2	(Kenya) (Nigeria)	Paul Wekesa; Yakubu Suleiman	6; 2	6; 4	7; 5
3	(Kenya) (Nigeria)	Eno Polo / Paul Wekesa; Nduka Odizor / Yakubu Suleiman	6^{6} 7^{8}	7^{7} 6^{5}	7; 5	6; 3
4	(Kenya) (Nigeria)	Paul Wekesa; Nduka Odizor	7; 5	6; 4	6; 1
5	(Kenya) (Nigeria)	Eno Polo; Yakubu Suleiman	3; 6	6; 4	3; 6

=== Ivory Coast vs. Egypt ===
Ivory Coast
4
Hôtel Ivoire, Abidjan, Ivory Coast
26–28 July 1991
Hard

Egypt
1

			1	2	3	4	5
1	(Ivory Coast) (Egypt)	Clément N'Goran; Hassan El-Aroussy	6; 2	6; 0	6; 2
2	(Ivory Coast) (Egypt)	Émile N'Goran; Tamer El-Sawy	2; 6	6; 3	3; 6	3; 6
3	(Ivory Coast) (Egypt)	Clément N'Goran / Émile N'Goran; Hassan El-Aroussy / Tamer El-Sawy	6; 0	6; 1	6; 3
4	(Ivory Coast) (Egypt)	Clément N'Goran; Tamer El-Sawy	6; 2	6; 4	6; 1
5	(Ivory Coast) (Egypt)	Émile N'Goran; Hassan El-Aroussy	6; 2	6; 0

== Fourth round ==
=== Kenya vs. Ivory Coast ===
Kenya
4
Nairobi Club Ground, Nairobi, Kenya
13–15 September 1991
Clay

Ivory Coast
1

			1	2	3	4	5
1	(Kenya) (Ivory Coast)	Paul Wekesa; Jean-Christophe Nabi	6; 1	6; 1	7^{7} 6^{0}
2	(Kenya) (Ivory Coast)	Eno Polo; Clément N'Goran	3; 6	3; 6	4; 6
3	(Kenya) (Ivory Coast)	Eno Polo / Paul Wekesa; Clément N'Goran / Émile N'Goran	4; 6	7^{10} 6^{8}	6; 4	6; 4
4	(Kenya) (Ivory Coast)	Paul Wekesa; Clément N'Goran	7; 5	6; 0	6; 2
5	(Kenya) (Ivory Coast)	Eno Polo; Jean-Christophe Nabi	6; 3	7^{7} 6^{5}
