= List of Morocco Davis Cup team representatives =

Tennis players who have represented Morocco

This is a list of tennis players who have represented the Morocco Davis Cup team in an official Davis Cup match. Morocco have taken part in the competition since 1961.

== Players ==
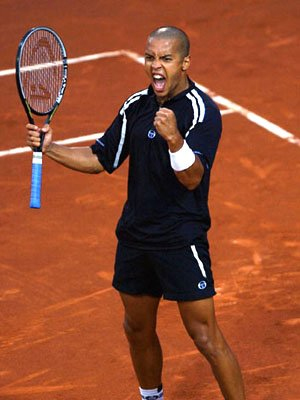
Hicham Arazi

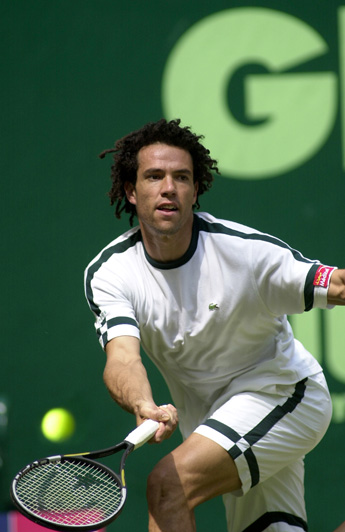
Younes El Aynaoui

Player	W-L (Total)	W-L (Singles)	W-L (Doubles)	Ties	Debut
Salahaddine Adbib	1–1	0–1	1–0	2	1992
Karim Alami	32–19	20–10	12–9	22	1990
Hicham Arazi	26–18	19–11	7–7	19	1993
Ahmed Ben Ali	0–1	0–0	0–1	1	1966
Ahmed Ben Omar	3–8	2–6	1–2	6	1972
Mohammed-Haibabi Bouchaib	6–6	4–3	2–3	6	1964
Lahcen Chadli	2–8	2–6	0–2	4	1961
Rabie Chaki	15–6	11–4	4–2	13	2006
Arafat Chekrouni	9–13	7–8	2–5	11	1984
Maurice Cohen	0–1	0–0	0–1	1	1961
Mustapha Dislam	4–9	2–7	2–2	6	1978
Mohammed Dlimi	10–13	6–5	4–8	15	1978
Ahmed Dougl	0–2	0–2	0–0	1	1961
Mounir El Aarej	8–23	7–14	1–9	19	1996
Mohammed-Chinois El Achraoui	2–0	2–0	0–0	2	1972
Reda El Amrani	11–6	7–3	4–3	12	2007
Younes El Aynaoui	28–19	26–11	2–8	22	1990
Anas Fattar	2–2	0–1	2–1	3	2011
Yassine Idmbarek	4–2	4–2	0–0	3	2011
Hicham Khaddari	2–0	1–0	1–0	1	2011
Omar Laimina	20–20	14–13	6–7	15	1972
Ali Laroussi	0–2	0–0	0–2	2	1965
Abdel Nadini	1–6	1–6	0–0	4	1984
Talal Ouahabi	5–7	3–4	2–3	10	2005
Khalid Outaleb	14–3	9–2	5–1	7	1988
Younès Rachidi	1–2	1–1	0–1	1	2012
Larbi Rharnit	0–1	0–1	0–0	1	1996
Mohammed Ridaoui	14–8	10–3	4–5	12	1989
Houcine Saber	6–15	3–11	3–4	12	1978
Mehdi Tahiri	6–17	6–12	0–5	12	1993
Abdullah Zamjaoui	0–1	0–1	0–0	1	1972
Mehdi Ziadi	8–9	1–4	7–5	14	2004
