= Milen Velev =

Bulgarian tennis player

Milen Velev Милен Велев
- Country (sports): Bulgaria
- Residence: Vienna, Austria
- Born: 4 September 1971 (age 53); Sofia, Bulgaria
- Turned pro: 1991
- Retired: 2002
- Plays: Right-handed
- Prize money: US$ 94,296

Singles
- Career record: 5–11 (at ATP Tour level, Grand Slam level, and in Davis Cup)
- Career titles: 0; 1 Challengers, 3 Futures
- Highest ranking: No. 121 (27 September 1993)

Grand Slam singles results
- Australian Open: 1R (1994)
- French Open: Q2 (1996)

Doubles
- Career record: 0–3 (at ATP Tour level, Grand Slam level, and in Davis Cup)
- Career titles: 0; 0 Challengers, 5 Futures
- Highest ranking: No. 253 (17 August 1998)
- Last updated on: 31 January 2021.

Milen Velev (Bulgarian: Милен Велев) (born 4 September 1971) is a former professional tennis player from Bulgaria.

== Career ==
Velev appeared in 20 Davis Cup ties for Bulgaria, from 1988 to 2002. He was victorious in 20 of his 34 rubbers, finishing with a 14/7 record in singles and 6/7 in doubles. Only Todor Enev has won more Davis Cup matches for the national team. He had his best win in 1993, when he defeated top 30 player Marcos Ondruska, a South African.

He was a quarter-finalist at the 1992 Saab International, an ATP Tour tournament held in Athens. En route he upset fifth seed Guillermo Pérez Roldán.

The Bulgarian played in the main draw of one Grand Slam event during his career, the 1994 Australian Open. He met veteran Mats Wilander in his opening round match, which he lost in four sets.

== Year-end rankings ==
| Year | 1988 | 1989 | 1990 | 1991 | 1992 | 1993 | 1994 | 1995 | 1996 | 1997 | 1998 | 1999 | 2000 | 2001 | 2002 | 2003 |
| Singles | 1054 | 686 | 477 | 308 | 286 | 125 | 647 | 295 | 521 | 386 | 295 | 604 | 649 | 409 | 947 | - |
| Doubles | 997 | 1056 | 575 | 655 | 1016 | - | 1170 | 1197 | 574 | 467 | 353 | 576 | 934 | 456 | 956 | 1531 |

== Challenger and Futures Finals ==
=== Singles: 7 (4–3) ===
| Legend (singles) ATP Challenger Tour (1–1) ITF Futures (3–2) | Titles by surface Hard (1–0) Clay (3–3) Grass (0–0) Carpet (0–0) |

| Result | W–L | Date | Tournament | Tier | Surface | Opponent | Score |
|---|---|---|---|---|---|---|---|
| Win | 1–9 | Jul 1993 | Oberstaufen, Germany | Challenger | Clay | (Czech Republic) Sláva Doseděl | 6–3, 7–6 |
| Loss | 1–1 | Jul 1993 | Poznań, Poland | Challenger | Clay | (Italy) Andrea Gaudenzi | 3–6, 6–3, 3–6 |
| Win | 2–1 | Jun 1998 | Yugoslavia F3B, Zaječar | Futures | Clay | (Australia) Dejan Petrovic | 6–4, 7–6 |
| Loss | 2–2 | Jun 1998 | Macedonia F1, Skopje | Futures | Clay | (France) Cyril Buscaglione | 6–4, 4–6, 3–6 |
| Win | 3–2 | Jul 1999 | Greece F5, Thessaloniki | Futures | Clay | (Greece) Solon Peppas | 6–3, 6–1 |
| Loss | 3–3 | Jun 2000 | Macedonia F1, Skopje | Futures | Clay | (France) Xavier Pujo | 2–6, 7–5, 3–6 |
| Win | 4–3 | Jul 2001 | Macedonia F3, Skopje | Futures | Hard | (Bulgaria) Todor Enev | 7–5, 6–4 |

=== Doubles: 8 (5–3) ===
| Legend (doubles) ATP Challenger Tour (0–1) ITF Futures (5–2) | Titles by surface Hard (2–0) Clay (2–2) Grass (0–0) Carpet (1–1) |

| Result | W–L | Date | Tournament | Tier | Surface | Partner | Opponents | Score |
|---|---|---|---|---|---|---|---|---|
| Loss | 0–1 | Feb 1998 | Austria F3, Mondseeland | Futures | Carpet (i) | (Bulgaria) Ivaylo Traykov | (Czech Republic) Petr Pála (Slovenia) Borut Urh | 4–6, 6–7 |
| Win | 1–1 | Jun 1998 | Macedonia F1, Skopje | Futures | Clay | (Austria) Matey Pampoulov | (France) Cyril Buscaglione (Germany) Olaf Knutel | 3–6, 6–4, 6–4 |
| Win | 2–1 | Jun 1998 | Macedonia F2, Kočani | Futures | Clay | (Austria) Matey Pampoulov | (Slovakia) Erik Csarnakovics (Italy) Stefano Galvani | 7–5, 6–3 |
| Loss | 2–2 | Aug 1998 | Sopot, Poland | Challenger | Clay | (Belarus) Alexander Shvets | (New Zealand) James Greenhalgh (Federal Republic of Yugoslavia) Nenad Zimonjić | 1–6, 3–6 |
| Win | 3–2 | Jul 1999 | Greece F4, Alexandroupolis | Futures | Carpet | (Bulgaria) Ivaylo Traykov | (Chile) Fernando González (Pakistan) Aisam-ul-Haq Qureshi | 7–6^{(7–2)}, 7–6^{(7–4)} |
| Win | 4–2 | Jul 2000 | Macedonia F3, Skopje | Futures | Hard | (Federal Republic of Yugoslavia) Relja Dulić Fišer | (Germany) Sebastian Fitz (Russia) Sergei Pozdnev | 2–6, 6–2, 7–6^{(7–3)} |
| Loss | 4–3 | Jun 2001 | Macedonia F2, Skopje | Futures | Clay | (Bulgaria) Todor Enev | (Russia) Mikhail Elgin (Russia) Evgueni Smirnov | 6–4, 4–6, 1–6 |
| Win | 5–3 | Jul 2001 | Macedonia F3, Skopje | Futures | Hard | (Bulgaria) Todor Enev | (Bulgaria) Radoslav Lukaev (North Macedonia) Predrag Rusevski | 6–2, 7–5 |

== Davis Cup ==
Milen Velev debuted for the Bulgaria Davis Cup team in 1988. Since then he has 16 nominations with 20 ties played, his singles W/L record is 14–7 and doubles W/L record is 6–7 (20–14 overall).

=== Singles (14–7) ===
| Edition | Round | Date | Surface | Opponent | W/L | Result |
|---|---|---|---|---|---|---|
| 1990 Europe Zone Group II | QF | 4 May 1990 | Clay | (Greece) George Kalovelonis | W | 6–3, 6–4, 6–0 |
| 1990 Europe Zone Group II | QF | 6 May 1990 | Clay | (Greece) Konstantinos Effraimoglou | W | 6–2, 7–5 |
| 1990 Europe Zone Group II | SF | 15 June 1990 | Clay | (Poland) Tomasz Iwański | L | 3–6, 2–6, 3–6 |
| 1990 Europe Zone Group II | SF | 17 June 1990 | Clay | (Poland) Wojciech Kowalski | L | 6–7^{(3–7)}, 5–7 |
| 1993 Europe/Africa Zone Group II | R1 | 30 April 1993 | Clay | (Poland) Darek Nowicki | W | 7–5, 6–4, 7–6^{(8–6)} |
| 1993 Europe/Africa Zone Group II | R1 | 2 May 1993 | Clay | (Poland) Bartłomiej Dąbrowski | W | 6–2, 5–7, 6–4, 6–1 |
| 1993 Europe/Africa Zone Group II | QF | 16 July 1993 | Clay | (South Africa) Marcos Ondruska | W | 6–4, 6–4, 1–6, 6–1 |
| 1993 Europe/Africa Zone Group II | QF | 18 July 1993 | Clay | (South Africa) Wayne Ferreira | L | 3–6, 6–3, 6–4, 4–6, 2–6 |
| 1998 Europe/Africa Zone Group II | R1 | 1 May 1998 | Clay (I) | (Morocco) Karim Alami | L | 6–7^{(3–7)}, 6–4, 6–7^{(2–7)}, 2–6 |
| 1998 Europe/Africa Zone Group II | R1 | 3 May 1998 | Clay (I) | (Morocco) Mehdi Tahiri | W | 6–2, 6–3 |
| 1998 Europe/Africa Zone Group II | RPO | 17 July 1998 | Clay | (Luxembourg) Pascal Schaul | W | 6–3, 6–1, 7–5 |
| 1999 Europe/Africa Zone Group II | R1 | 30 April 1999 | Clay | (Togo) Goudjo Gbedey | W | 6–2, 6–2, 6–2 |
| 1999 Europe/Africa Zone Group II | QF | 16 July 1999 | Clay | (Hungary) Attila Sávolt | W | 1–6, 7–6^{(7–2)}, 6–2, 6–0 |
| 2000 Europe/Africa Zone Group II | R1 | 30 April 2000 | Clay | (Greece) Vasilis Mazarakis | L | 6–7^{(5–7)}, 2–6, 0–6 |
| 2000 Europe/Africa Zone Group II | QF | 21 July 2000 | Clay | (Israel) Harel Levy | L | 1–6, 3–6, 2–6 |
| 2001 Europe/Africa Zone Group III | RR | 23 May 2001 | Clay | (Namibia) Johan Theron | W | 4–1, 4–0, 4–0 |
| 2001 Europe/Africa Zone Group III | RR | 24 May 2001 | Clay | (Togo) Komlavi Loglo | W | 5–3, 4–0, 4–2 |
| 2001 Europe/Africa Zone Group III | RR | 25 May 2001 | Clay | (North Macedonia) Predrag Rusevski | W | 4–2, 4–5^{(4–7)}, 1–4, 5–4^{(7–3)}, 8–6 |
| 2001 Europe/Africa Zone Group III | SF | 26 May 2001 | Clay | (Bosnia and Herzegovina) Haris Bašalić | W | 4–0, 5–3, 4–1 |
| 2002 Europe/Africa Zone Group II | R1 | 3 May 2002 | Clay | (Ukraine) Orest Tereshchuk | L | 3–6, 6–2, 4–6, 1–6 |
| 2002 Europe/Africa Zone Group II | R1 | 5 May 2002 | Clay | (Ukraine) Andrei Dernovskiy | W | 7–5, 5–7, 6–4, 6–3 |

=== Doubles (6–7) ===
| Edition | Round | Date | Partner | Surface | Opponents | W/L | Result |
|---|---|---|---|---|---|---|---|
| 1988 Europe Zone Group I | RPO | 11 June 1988 | (Bulgaria) Julian Stamatov | Clay | (Romania) George Cosac (Romania) Florin Segărceanu | L | 4–6, 1–6, 4–6 |
| 1988 Europe Zone Group II | QF | 13 May 1989 | (Bulgaria) Krassimir Lazarov | Clay | (Monaco) Christophe Boggetti (Monaco) Jacques Vincileoni | L | 6–7^{(2–7)}, 6–1, 6–3, 1–6, 6–8 |
| 1990 Europe Zone Group II | R1 | 31 March 1990 | (Bulgaria) Ivan Keskinov | Clay | (Cyprus) Yiannos Hadjigeorgiou (Cyprus) Neoclis Neocleous | W | 6–1, 6–1, 6–4 |
| 1990 Europe Zone Group II | QF | 5 May 1990 | (Bulgaria) Stefan Tzvetkov | Clay | (Greece) George Kalovelonis (Greece) Ioannis Rigas | W | 6–7^{(5–7)}, 1–6, 6–2, 6–1, 6–3 |
| 1990 Europe Zone Group II | SF | 16 June 1990 | (Bulgaria) Stefan Tzvetkov | Clay | (Poland) Tomasz Iwański (Poland) Wojciech Kowalski | L | 6–3, 4–6, 1–6, 2–6 |
| 1993 Europe/Africa Zone Group II | R1 | 1 May 1993 | (Bulgaria) Krassimir Lazarov | Clay | (Poland) Tomasz Iwański (Poland) Darek Nowicki | L | 6–4, 5–7, 5–7, 2–6 |
| 1998 Europe/Africa Zone Group II | R1 | 2 May 1998 | (Bulgaria) Orlin Stanoytchev | Clay (I) | (Morocco) Karim Alami (Morocco) Mounir El Aarej | L | 4–6, 5–7, 2–6 |
| 1998 Europe/Africa Zone Group II | RPO | 18 July 1998 | (Bulgaria) Orlin Stanoytchev | Clay | (Luxembourg) Adrian Graimprey (Luxembourg) Pascal Schaul | W | 6–3, 6–2, 6–4 |
| 1999 Europe/Africa Zone Group II | R1 | 1 May 1999 | (Bulgaria) Ivaylo Traykov | Clay | (Togo) Jean-Kome Loglo (Togo) Kossi Loglo | W | 6–2, 6–4, 6–4 |
| 1999 Europe/Africa Zone Group II | QF | 17 July 1999 | (Bulgaria) Ivaylo Traykov | Clay | (Hungary) Zoltán Böröczky (Hungary) Attila Sávolt | L | 3–6, 6–2, 3–6, 6–3, 5–7 |
| 2001 Europe/Africa Zone Group III | F | 27 May 2001 | (Bulgaria) Todor Enev | Clay | (Egypt) Mohamed Mamoun (Egypt) Marwan Zewar | W | 4–2, 4–2, 4–1 |
| 2002 Europe/Africa Zone Group II | R1 | 4 May 2002 | (Bulgaria) Todor Enev | Clay | (Ukraine) Andrei Dernovskiy (Ukraine) Orest Tereshchuk | W | 7–6^{(7–5)}, 6–7^{(5–7)}, 7–6^{(7–4)}, 6–3 |
| 2002 Europe/Africa Zone Group II | QF | 13 July 2002 | (Bulgaria) Todor Enev | Hard | (Ivory Coast) Claude N'Goran (Ivory Coast) Valentin Sanon | L | 4–6, 7–5, 2–6, 6–1, 4–6 |

- RPO = Relegation Play–off
- RR = Round Robin
