= Krister Wedenby =

Swedish tennis player

- Country (sports): Sweden
- Residence: Gothenburg, Sweden
- Born: 13 December 1971 (age 53); Jönköping, Sweden
- Height: 185 cm (6 ft 1 in)
- Plays: Left-handed
- Prize money: $6,175

Singles
- Career record: 0–1
- Career titles: 0
- Highest ranking: No. 260 (12 October 1992)

Doubles
- Career titles: 0; 1 Challenger
- Highest ranking: No. 336 (9 November 1992)

Krister Wedenby (born 13 December 1971) is a former professional tennis player from Sweden.

== Tennis career ==
Wedenby competed professionally during the early 1990s, winning one doubles title on the ATP Challenger Tour, when he and partner Wojciech Kowalski were victorious at the tournament in Vienna. His only ATP Tour main draw appearance came in singles, at the 1990 Stockholm Open, where he lost to David Wheaton in the first round.

On the ITF Satellite circuit, he won the singles title at the France 3 Circuit, in 1992. Wedenby reached a career high singles ranking of 260 and a best doubles ranking of 336 in the world.

== Challenger titles ==
=== Doubles: (1) ===
| No. | Date | Tournament | Surface | Partner | Opponents | Score |
|---|---|---|---|---|---|---|
| 1. | Aug 1992 | Vienna, Austria | Clay | (Poland) Wojciech Kowalski | (Germany) Alexis Hombrecher (Russia) Andrei Merinov | 7–6, 4–6, 6–3 |
