= Khalid Outaleb =

Moroccan tennis player

- Country (sports): Morocco
- Born: 27 April 1963 (age 62) Casablanca, Morocco
- Height: 6 ft 0 in (183 cm)
- Prize money: $14,581

Singles
- Career record: 0–1
- Highest ranking: No. 246 (20 Mar 1989)

Doubles
- Career record: 0–2
- Highest ranking: No. 380 (3 Apr 1989)

Khalid Outaleb (born 27 April 1963) is a Moroccan former professional tennis player.

Born in Casablanca, Outaleb was a collegiate tennis player for Florida Institute of Technology from 1983 to 1986, claiming two Sunshine State Conference Singles Championships.

Outaleb, a two-time national singles champion, turned professional in 1988 and reached a best world ranking of 246. He was a playing member of the Morocco Davis Cup team from 1988 to 1990, registering wins in nine singles and five doubles rubbers.

== See also ==
- List of Morocco Davis Cup team representatives
