= Derek Farren =

Irish-American tennis player

- Country (sports): Ireland
- Born: June 2, 1970 (age 54); Chicago, United States
- Height: 6 ft 0 in (183 cm)

Singles
- Highest ranking: No. 399 (Nov 18, 1991)

Grand Slam singles results
- Australian Open: Q1 (1992)

Doubles
- Highest ranking: No. 616 (Nov 18, 1991)

Derek Farren (born June 2, 1970) is an Irish-American former professional tennis player.

Born to Irish parents in Chicago, Farren turned professional in 1991, after one year of collegiate tennis at Long Beach State. He had a best singles ranking of 399 while competing on the professional tour and was a quarter-finalist at the 1991 Christchurch Challenger. Through his parents he qualified to play Davis Cup for Ireland and featured in two ties, against Greece in 1992 and Ghana in 1993. His nephew, Connor Farren, is a professional tennis player.

== See also ==
- List of Ireland Davis Cup team representatives
