= Eoin Collins =

Irish tennis player (born 1968)

- Born: 28 July 1968 (age 57); Dublin
- Occupation: Tennis Player

Eoin Collins (born 28 July 1968 in Dublin) is a former tennis player from Ireland.

Collins represented Ireland in the doubles competition at the 1988 Summer Olympics. He also competed at 1992 Summer Olympics in Barcelona, partnering Owen Casey. The pair were eliminated in the second round.

Collins reached his highest singles ATP-ranking on 15 July 1991, when he became World Number 461.
