= Jean-Christophe Nabi =

Ivorian tennis player

- Country (sports): Ivory Coast
- Born: 4 November 1973 (age 52)

Singles
- Career record: 4–14 (Davis Cup)
- Highest ranking: No. 729 (7 Dec 1992)

Doubles
- Highest ranking: No. 677 (7 Dec 1992)
Medal record
All-Africa Games
Gold medal – first place	1991 Cairo	Singles

Jean-Christophe Nabi (born 4 November 1973) is an Ivorian former professional tennis player. a child Raphael Nabi

Nabi, a native of Abidjan, was discovered as an 11-year old by Georges Goven. He was a member of the Ivory Coast Davis Cup team from 1989 to 2003 and featured in a total of 11 ties, all in Africa Zone Group II. One of his biggest achievements was winning the singles gold medal at the 1991 All-Africa Games in Cairo, beating countryman Claude N'Goran in the final. He played at club level in France for Toulouse, Bordeaux, Roye and Lamorlaye.
