= Tomasz Iwański =

Polish tennis player

- Country (sports): Poland
- Born: 5 December 1968 (age 57) Łódź, Poland
- Plays: Right-handed

Singles
- Career record: 8–3 (Davis Cup)
- Highest ranking: No. 568 (2 Nov 1992)

Doubles
- Career record: 4–3 (Davis Cup)
- Highest ranking: No. 317 (1 Mar 1993)

Tomasz Iwański (born 5 December 1968) is a Polish former professional tennis player. A winner of nine national championships, he is head coach of the Polish Tennis Association and formerly coached top-10 player Nadia Petrova.

A native of Łódź, Iwański was runner-up to Wojciech Kowalski at the Polish national championships in 1989, but won four men's doubles championships during his career as well as one mixed doubles title. He was national indoor singles champion in 1991 and a three-time men's doubles indoor champion.

Iwański competed for the Poland Davis Cup team between 1989 and 1994. He helped Poland gain promotion to Europe/Africa Zone Group I in 1990, winning two singles rubbers in the final against Norway. Appearing in a total of 10 ties, he won eight singles and four doubles rubbers for his country.

== Challenger titles ==
=== Doubles: (1) ===
No.	Year	Tournament	Surface	Partner	Opponents	Score
1.	1992	Poznań, Poland	Clay	(Belgium) Dick Norman	(Chile) Sergio Cortés (Spain) Vicente Solves	4–6, 6–3, 6–2

== See also ==
- List of Poland Davis Cup team representatives
