= Bent-Ove Pedersen =

Norwegian tennis player (born 1967)

- Country (sports): Norway
- Residence: Oslo, Norway
- Born: 11 July 1967 (age 58) Oslo, Norway
- Height: 1.85 m (6 ft 1 in)
- Turned pro: 1992
- Plays: Right-handed
- Prize money: $134,339

Singles
- Career record: 3–6
- Career titles: 0
- Highest ranking: No. 366 (13 Sep 1993)

Grand Slam singles results
- US Open: 1R (1993)

Doubles
- Career record: 34–40
- Career titles: 1
- Highest ranking: No. 78 (30 Aug 1993)

Grand Slam doubles results
- Australian Open: 1R (1993)
- French Open: 1R (1993)
- Wimbledon: 1R (1993)
- US Open: QF (1991)

Bent-Ove Pedersen (born 11 July 1967) is a former tennis player from Norway, who turned professional in 1992.

== Biography ==
He spent several years playing tennis at Berkeley in California. The right-hander represented his native country in the doubles competition at the 1992 Summer Olympics in Barcelona, where he partnered Christian Ruud. The pair was defeated in the first round by South Africa's eventual runners-up Wayne Ferreira and Piet Norval. Pedersen reached his highest singles ATP-ranking on 13 September 1993, when he became the number 366 of the world. He was in quarterfinal in US Open doubles, 1991, partnering Matt Lucena from the US. He became the number 78 on the doubles ranking 30. August 1993.

== Career finals ==
=== Doubles (1 win, 1 loss) ===
Result	W/L	Date	Tournament	Surface	Partner	Opponents	Score
Win	1–0	Oct 1992	Bolzano, Italy	Carpet (i)	(Sweden) Anders Järryd	(Netherlands) Tom Nijssen (Czechoslovakia) Cyril Suk	6–1, 6–7, 6–3
Loss	1–1	Jan 1993	Kuala Lumpur-1, Malaysia	Hard	(Sweden) Henrik Holm	(Netherlands) Jacco Eltingh (Netherlands) Paul Haarhuis	5–7, 3–6
