= Mohammed Ridaoui =

Moroccan tennis player

- Country (sports): Morocco
- Born: April 13, 1969 (age 56)

Singles
- Career record: 0–4
- Highest ranking: No. 427 (21 December 1992)

Doubles
- Career record: 0–6
- Highest ranking: No. 597 (8 February 1993)
Medal record
Mediterranean Games
Bronze medal – third place	1991 Athens	Doubles
Bronze medal – third place	1993 Languedoc-Roussillon	Doubles
- Last updated on: April 16, 2019.

Mohammed Ridaoui (born Abril 13, 1969) is a Moroccan retired professional tennis player who won two bronze medals at the Mediterranean Games partnering with Younes El Aynaoui. He played in twelve Davis Cup ties for Morocco from 1989 to 1993 and won fourteen of his 22 rubbers.
