= George Kalovelonis =

Greek tennis player (born 1959)

- Country (sports): Greece
- Born: 23 August 1959 (age 65); Athens, Greece
- Height: 6 ft 3 in (191 cm)
- Plays: Right-handed
- Prize money: $27,582

Singles
- Career record: 5–17
- Highest ranking: No. 208 (23 June 1986)

Doubles
- Career record: 1–13
- Highest ranking: No. 145 (15 September 1986)

Grand Slam doubles results
- US Open: 1R (1986)

George Kalovelonis (Greek: Γεώργιος Καλοβελώνης; born 23 August 1959) is a former tennis player from Greece, who represented his native country as a lucky loser at the 1988 Summer Olympics in Seoul. There he was defeated in the first round by fellow lucky loser Bong-Soo Kim from South Korea. The right-hander reached his highest singles ATP-ranking on 23 June 1986, when he became World Number 208.

Kalovelonis represented Greece in Davis Cup matches from 1978 through 1992. Kalovelonis is the coach of Anna Gerasimou and Vasilis Mazarakis.
