= Wojciech Kowalski =

Polish tennis player (born 1967)

- Country (sports): (Poland)
- Residence: Warsaw, Poland
- Born: 10 October 1967 (age 57); Inowrocław, Poland
- Height: 1.83 m (6 ft 0 in)
- Plays: Right-handed
- Prize money: $152,514

Singles
- Career record: 11–16
- Career titles: 0; 1 Challenger, 0 Futures
- Highest ranking: No. 109 (25 July 1988)

Grand Slam singles results
- French Open: 1R (1995)
- US Open: 1R (1988)

Other tournaments
- Olympic Games: 1R (1988)

Doubles
- Career record: 2–8
- Career titles: 0; 1 Challenger, 0 Futures
- Highest ranking: No. 125 (28 November 1988)

Grand Slam doubles results
- US Open: 1R (1988)
- Last updated on: 31 January 2022.

Wojciech "Wojtek" Kowalski (born 10 October 1967) is a Polish former tennis player.

== Career ==
Kowalski represented his native country as a qualifier at the 1988 Summer Olympics in Seoul. There he was defeated in the first round by fellow qualifier Tony Mmoh from Nigeria.

He played mostly on the Challenger tour level and reached four singles finals and winning one title. The right-hander reached his highest singles ATP-ranking on 25 July 1988, when he became the number 109 of the world.

He is married to Klaudia Kowalski and has two sons, Jonas and Moritz. Right now he is working as a tennis coach for TB Erlangen in his own tennis school Tennisschule Kowalski.

== ATP Challenger and ITF Futures finals ==
=== Singles: 2 (1–1) ===
| Legend ATP Challenger (1–1) ITF Futures (0–0) | Finals by surface Hard (0–0) Clay (1–1) Grass (0–0) Carpet (0–0) |

| Result | W–L | Date | Tournament | Tier | Surface | Opponent | Score |
|---|---|---|---|---|---|---|---|
| Win | 1-0 | Jun 1995 | Eisenach, Germany | Challenger | Clay | (Germany) Dirk Dier | 7–6, 6–3 |
| Loss | 1-1 | Jul 1995 | Montauban, France | Challenger | Clay | (Belgium) Johan Van Herck | 4–6, 6–4, 3–6 |

=== Doubles: 1 (1–0) ===
| Legend ATP Challenger (1–0) ITF Futures (0–0) | Finals by surface Hard (0–0) Clay (1–0) Grass (0–0) Carpet (0–0) |

| Result | W–L | Date | Tournament | Tier | Surface | Partner | Opponents | Score |
|---|---|---|---|---|---|---|---|---|
| Win | 1–0 | Aug 1992 | Vienna, Austria | Challenger | Clay | (Sweden) Christer Wedenby | (United States) Alexis Hombrecher (Russia) Andrey Merinov | 7–6, 4–6, 6–3 |

== Performance timeline ==
Key
| W | F | SF | QF | #R | RR | Q# | DNQ | A | NH |

(W) winner; (F) finalist; (SF) semifinalist; (QF) quarterfinalist; (#R) rounds 4, 3, 2, 1; (RR) round-robin stage; (Q#) qualification round; (DNQ) did not qualify; (A) absent; (NH) not held; (SR) strike rate (events won / competed); (W–L) win–loss record.

=== Singles ===
| Tournament | 1988 | 1989 | 1990 | 1991 | 1992 | 1993 | 1994 | 1995 | 1996 | SR | W–L | Win % |
|---|---|---|---|---|---|---|---|---|---|---|---|---|
Grand Slam tournaments
| Australian Open | A | A | A | A | A | A | A | A | A | 0 / 0 | 0–0 | – |
| French Open | A | A | A | A | A | A | A | 1R | A | 0 / 1 | 0–1 | 0% |
| Wimbledon | A | A | A | A | A | A | A | A | A | 0 / 0 | 0–0 | – |
| US Open | 1R | A | A | A | A | A | A | A | Q1 | 0 / 1 | 0–1 | 0% |
| Win–loss | 0–1 | 0–0 | 0–0 | 0–0 | 0–0 | 0–0 | 0–0 | 0–1 | 0–0 | 0 / 2 | 0–2 | 0% |
Olympic Games
| Summer Olympics | 1R | Not Held | | | A | Not Held | | | A | 0 / 1 | 0–1 | 0% |
ATP Tour Masters 1000
| Indian Wells | A | A | A | A | A | A | A | A | Q1 | 0 / 0 | 0–0 | – |
| Miami | A | A | A | A | A | A | A | A | 2R | 0 / 1 | 1–1 | 50% |
| Cincinnati | A | A | A | A | A | A | A | A | 2R | 0 / 1 | 1–1 | 50% |
| Win–loss | 0–0 | 0–0 | 0–0 | 0–0 | 0–0 | 0–0 | 0–0 | 0–0 | 2–2 | 0 / 2 | 2–2 | 50% |
