= 1978 Davis Cup Europe Zone =

Regional zone of the 1978 Davis Cup

The Europe Zone was one of the three regional zones of the 1978 Davis Cup.

29 teams entered the Europe Zone, competing across 2 sub-zones. 25 teams entered the competition in the qualifying round, competing for 4 places in each sub-zone's main draw to join the 4 finalists from the 1977 Europe Zone. The winners of each sub-zone's main draw went on to compete in the Inter-Zonal Zone against the winners of the Americas Zone and Eastern Zone.

Great Britain defeated Czechoslovakia in the Zone A final, and Sweden defeated Hungary in the Zone B final, resulting in both Great Britain and Sweden progressing to the Inter-Zonal Zone.

== Zone A ==
=== Preliminary rounds ===
==== Draw ====
First Round
Monte Carlo, Monaco
Monaco | 5
Luxembourg | 0
bye
Great Britain
Tel Aviv, Israel (hard)
Israel | 5
Finland | 0
bye
Austria
Czechoslovakia
bye
Zeist, Netherlands (clay)
Netherlands | 4
Greece | 1
Poland
bye
Algiers, Algeria (clay)
Algeria | 1
Iran | 4

Qualifying Round
Monte Carlo, Monaco (clay)
Monaco | 0
Great Britain | 5
Tel Aviv, Israel (hard)
Israel | 2
Austria | 3
Prague, Czechoslovakia (indoor clay)
Czechoslovakia | 3
Netherlands | 1
Warsaw, Poland
Poland | 4
Iran | 1

==== First round ====
Monaco vs. Luxembourg

Monaco
5
Monte Carlo, Monaco
16–18 September 1977

Luxembourg
0

| | | | 1 | 2 | 3 | 4 | 5 |
|---|---|---|---|---|---|---|---|
| 1 | (Monaco) (Luxembourg) | Louis Borfiga; Jean Brucher | 6; 4 | 6; 1 | 6; 2 |
| 2 | (Monaco) (Luxembourg) | Bernard Balleret; Marc Klensch | 6; 1 | 6; 2 | 6; 1 |
| 3 | (Monaco) (Luxembourg) | Bernard Balleret / Louis Borfiga; Fernand Claude / Théo Storck | 6; 2 | 6; 0 | 6; 3 |
| 4 | (Monaco) (Luxembourg) | Bernard Balleret; Jean Brucher | 6; 0 | 6; 3 | 6; 1 |
| 5 | (Monaco) (Luxembourg) | Louis Borfiga; Marc Klensch | 6; 3 | 6; 1 | 6; 2 |

Israel vs. Finland

Israel
5
Tel Aviv, Israel
16–18 September 1977
Hard

Finland
0

| | | | 1 | 2 | 3 | 4 | 5 |
|---|---|---|---|---|---|---|---|
| 1 | (Israel) (Finland) | Yair Wertheimer; George Berner | 3; 6 | 6; 0 | 6; 2 | 6; 4 |
| 2 | (Israel) (Finland) | Shlomo Glickstein; Matti Timonen | 2; 6 | 6; 2 | 6; 3 | 6; 2 |
| 3 | (Israel) (Finland) | Shlomo Glickstein / Yair Wertheimer; George Berner / Matti Timonen | 6; 2 | 6; 1 | 3; 6 | 2; 6 | 6; 1 |
| 4 | (Israel) (Finland) | Yair Wertheimer; Matti Timonen | 6; 2 | 6; 3 | 6; 3 |
| 5 | (Israel) (Finland) | Ilan Sher; Kristian Tammivuori | 7; 5 | 4; 6 | 6; 2 | 6; 3 |

Netherlands vs. Greece

Netherlands
4
Zeist, Netherlands
16–18 September 1977
Clay

Greece
1

| | | | 1 | 2 | 3 | 4 | 5 |
|---|---|---|---|---|---|---|---|
| 1 | (Netherlands) (Greece) | Louk Sanders; Nicolas Kelaidis | 7; 5 | 6; 1 | 6; 2 |
| 2 | (Netherlands) (Greece) | Wouter Fok; Nicholas Kalogeropoulos | 4; 6 | 6; 0 | 5; 7 | 6; 3 | 3; 6 |
| 3 | (Netherlands) (Greece) | Wouter Fok / Louk Sanders; Nicholas Kalogeropoulos / Nicolas Kelaidis | 6; 1 | 6; 2 | 6; 3 |
| 4 | (Netherlands) (Greece) | Wouter Fok; Nicolas Kelaidis | 6; 2 | 4; 6 | 2; 6 | 6; 0 | 6; 1 |
| 5 | (Netherlands) (Greece) | Louk Sanders; Nicholas Kalogeropoulos | 8; 6 | 6; 4 | 3; 6 | 8; 6 |

Algeria vs. Iran

Algeria
1
Hydra Athletic Club, Algiers, Algeria
10–12 August 1977
Clay

Iran
4

| | | | 1 | 2 | 3 | 4 | 5 |
|---|---|---|---|---|---|---|---|
| 1 | (Algeria) (Iran) | Abdeslam Mahmoudi; Mansour Bahrami | 3; 6 | 4; 6 | 4; 6 |
| 2 | (Algeria) (Iran) | Fouad-Kamel Boudjemline; Moharram-Ali Khodai | 2; 6 | 1; 6 | 2; 6 |
| 3 | (Algeria) (Iran) | Fouad-Kamel Boudjemline / Abdeslam Mahmoudi; Mansour Bahrami / Kamyab Derafshijavan | 6; 3 | 4; 6 | 1; 6 | 2; 6 |
| 4 | (Algeria) (Iran) | Abdeslam Mahmoudi; Moharram-Ali Khodai | 6; 4 | 6; 4 | 6; 2 |
| 5 | (Algeria) (Iran) | Hocine Younes; Mansour Bahrami | 3; 6 | 4; 6 | 6; 8 |

==== Qualifying round ====
Monaco vs. Great Britain

Monaco
0
Monte Carlo, Monaco
17–19 March 1978
Clay

Great Britain
5

| | | | 1 | 2 | 3 | 4 | 5 |
|---|---|---|---|---|---|---|---|
| 1 | (Monaco) (United Kingdom) | Louis Borfiga; John Lloyd | 2; 6 | 1; 6 | 4; 6 |
| 2 | (Monaco) (United Kingdom) | Bernard Balleret; Richard Lewis | 6; 8 | 6; 4 | 12; 10 | 5; 7 | 1; 6 |
| 3 | (Monaco) (United Kingdom) | Louis Borfiga / Michel Borfiga; David Lloyd / John Lloyd | 2; 6 | 1; 6 | 1; 6 |
| 4 | (Monaco) (United Kingdom) | Louis Borfiga; Richard Lewis | 6; 2 | 6; 2 | 6; 8 | 1; 6 | 1; 6 |
| 5 | (Monaco) (United Kingdom) | Bernard Balleret; John Lloyd | 1; 6 | 2; 6 |

Israel vs. Austria

Israel
2
Tel Aviv, Israel
17–19 March 1978
Hard

Austria
3

| | | | 1 | 2 | 3 | 4 | 5 |
|---|---|---|---|---|---|---|---|
| 1 | (Israel) (Austria) | Shlomo Glickstein; Peter Feigl | 4; 6 | 3; 6 | 6; 1 | 7; 9 |
| 2 | (Israel) (Austria) | Steve Krulevitz; Hans Kary | 4; 6 | 4; 6 | 6; 4 | 6; 1 | 6; 2 |
| 3 | (Israel) (Austria) | Steve Krulevitz / Yair Wertheimer; Peter Feigl / Hans Kary | 6; 8 | 4; 6 | 5; 7 |
| 4 | (Israel) (Austria) | Steve Krulevitz; Peter Feigl | 6; 4 | 8; 6 | 6; 3 |
| 5 | (Israel) (Austria) | Shlomo Glickstein; Hans Kary | 6; 3 | 9; 7 | 4; 6 | 6; 8 | 3; 6 |

Czechoslovakia vs. Netherlands

Czechoslovakia
3
Prague, Czechoslovakia
17–19 March 1978
Clay (indoors)

Netherlands
1

| | | | 1 | 2 | 3 | 4 | 5 |
|---|---|---|---|---|---|---|---|---|
| 1 | (Czechoslovakia) (Netherlands) | Jan Kodeš; Tom Okker | 6; 4 | 7; 9 | 6; 0 | 3; 6 | 4; 6 |
| 2 | (Czechoslovakia) (Netherlands) | Jiří Hřebec; Louk Sanders | 6; 2 | 7; 5 | 6; 3 |
| 3 | (Czechoslovakia) (Netherlands) | Jan Kodeš / Tomáš Šmíd; Tom Okker / Louk Sanders | 9; 7 | 6; 2 | 6; 2 |
| 4 | (Czechoslovakia) (Netherlands) | Jiří Hřebec; Tom Okker | 6; 3 | 2; 6 | 6; 1 | 6; 4 |
| 5 | (Czechoslovakia) (Netherlands) | Tomáš Šmíd; Louk Sanders | 4; 6 | 3; 6 | | | | not completed |

Poland vs. Iran

Poland
4
Warsaw, Poland
17–19 March 1978

Iran
1

| | | | 1 | 2 | 3 | 4 | 5 |
|---|---|---|---|---|---|---|---|
| 1 | (Poland) (Iran) | Wojciech Fibak; Moharram-Ali Khodai | 6; 0 | 7; 5 | 6; 0 |
| 2 | (Poland) (Iran) | Czesław Dobrowolski; Mansour Bahrami | 6; 8 | 4; 6 | 6; 4 | 6; 3 | 3; 6 |
| 3 | (Poland) (Iran) | Wojciech Fibak / Tadeusz Nowicki; Mansour Bahrami / Kamyab Derafshijavan | 6; 1 | 6; 1 | 6; 4 |
| 4 | (Poland) (Iran) | Wojciech Fibak; Mansour Bahrami | 6; 3 | 6; 1 | 6; 2 |
| 5 | (Poland) (Iran) | Czesław Dobrowolski; Moharram-Ali Khodai | 6; 1 | 6; 0 | 6; 4 |

=== Main draw ===
==== Draw ====
Quarterfinals; 16–18 June
France
bye
Bristol, United Kingdom (grass)
Great Britain | 5
Austria | 0
Prague, Czechoslovakia (clay)
Czechoslovakia | 3
Poland | 2
bye
Romania

Semifinals; 13–15 July
Paris, France (clay)
France | 2
Great Britain | 3
Prague, Czechoslovakia (clay)
Czechoslovakia | 5
Romania | 0

Final; 15–17 September
Eastbourne, United Kingdom (grass)
Great Britain | 5
Czechoslovakia | 0

==== Quarterfinals ====
Great Britain vs. Austria

Great Britain
5
Bristol Lawn Tennis Club, Bristol, United Kingdom
16–18 June 1978
Grass

Austria
0

| | | | 1 | 2 | 3 | 4 | 5 |
|---|---|---|---|---|---|---|---|
| 1 | (United Kingdom) (Austria) | John Lloyd; Peter Feigl | 7; 5 | 6; 2 | 2; 6 | 9; 7 |
| 2 | (United Kingdom) (Austria) | Buster Mottram; Hans Kary | 6; 2 | 6; 3 | 6; 1 |
| 3 | (United Kingdom) (Austria) | David Lloyd / Buster Mottram; Peter Feigl / Cliff Letcher | 4; 6 | 6; 3 | 4; 6 | 6; 4 | 6; 3 |
| 4 | (United Kingdom) (Austria) | Richard Lewis; Robert Reininger | 3; 6 | 6; 4 | 8; 6 | 6; 4 |
| 5 | (United Kingdom) (Austria) | Buster Mottram; Peter Feigl | 6; 4 | 6; 3 | 6; 1 |

Czechoslovakia vs. Poland

Czechoslovakia
3
Prague, Czechoslovakia
16–18 June 1978
Clay

Poland
2

| | | | 1 | 2 | 3 | 4 | 5 |
|---|---|---|---|---|---|---|---|
| 1 | (Czechoslovakia) (Poland) | Jan Kodeš; Henryk Drzymalski | 6; 0 | 6; 3 | 7; 5 |
| 2 | (Czechoslovakia) (Poland) | Jiří Hřebec; Wojciech Fibak | 5; 7 | 5; 7 | 4; 6 |
| 3 | (Czechoslovakia) (Poland) | Jan Kodeš / Tomáš Šmíd; Wojciech Fibak / Tadeusz Nowicki | 8; 6 | 6; 3 | 7; 5 |
| 4 | (Czechoslovakia) (Poland) | Jan Kodeš; Wojciech Fibak | 6; 8 | 4; 6 | 2; 6 |
| 5 | (Czechoslovakia) (Poland) | Jiří Hřebec; Henryk Drzymalski | 6; 1 | 6; 1 | 3; 6 | 6; 4 |

==== Semifinals ====
France vs. Great Britain

France
2
Stade Roland Garros, Paris, France
13–15 July 1978
Clay

Great Britain
3

| | | | 1 | 2 | 3 | 4 | 5 |
|---|---|---|---|---|---|---|---|
| 1 | (France) (United Kingdom) | Yannick Noah; Buster Mottram | 6; 3 | 3; 6 | 7; 9 | 3; 6 |
| 2 | (France) (United Kingdom) | Éric Deblicker; John Lloyd | 2; 6 | 2; 6 | 6; 4 | 6; 3 | 3; 6 |
| 3 | (France) (United Kingdom) | François Jauffret / Yannick Noah; David Lloyd / John Lloyd | 6; 3 | 6; 1 | 7; 5 |
| 4 | (France) (United Kingdom) | Éric Deblicker; Buster Mottram | 5; 7 | 4; 6 | 1; 6 |
| 5 | (France) (United Kingdom) | Yannick Noah; John Lloyd | 6; 3 | 6; 2 | 7; 5 |

Czechoslovakia vs. Romania

Czechoslovakia
5
Prague, Czechoslovakia
13–15 July 1978
Clay

Romania
0

| | | | 1 | 2 | 3 | 4 | 5 |
|---|---|---|---|---|---|---|---|
| 1 | (Czechoslovakia) (Romania) | Pavel Složil; Andrei Dîrzu | 6; 2 | 6; 4 | 7; 5 |
| 2 | (Czechoslovakia) (Romania) | Tomáš Šmíd; Dumitru Hărădău | 7; 5 | 6; 1 | 6; 8 | 6; 1 |
| 3 | (Czechoslovakia) (Romania) | Pavel Složil / Tomáš Šmíd; Andrei Dîrzu / Florin Segărceanu | 6; 4 | 6; 2 | 6; 4 |
| 4 | (Czechoslovakia) (Romania) | Pavel Složil; Florin Segărceanu | 6; 3 | 6; 4 |
| 5 | (Czechoslovakia) (Romania) | Tomáš Šmíd; Andrei Dîrzu | 6; 3 | 6; 2 |

==== Final ====
Great Britain vs. Czechoslovakia

Great Britain
5
Devonshire Park, Eastbourne, United Kingdom
15–17 September 1978
Grass

Czechoslovakia
0

| | | | 1 | 2 | 3 | 4 | 5 |
|---|---|---|---|---|---|---|---|
| 1 | (United Kingdom) (Czechoslovakia) | John Lloyd; Jiří Hřebec | 9; 7 | 6; 3 | 4; 6 | 5; 7 | 12; 10 |
| 2 | (United Kingdom) (Czechoslovakia) | Buster Mottram; Ivan Lendl | 6; 4 | 7; 5 | 7; 5 |
| 3 | (United Kingdom) (Czechoslovakia) | Mark Cox / David Lloyd; Jan Kodeš / Tomáš Šmíd | 6; 4 | 13; 15 | 6; 4 | 2; 6 | 6; 4 |
| 4 | (United Kingdom) (Czechoslovakia) | Mark Cox; Ivan Lendl | 6; 2 | 6; 4 | 6; 3 |
| 5 | (United Kingdom) (Czechoslovakia) | Buster Mottram; Jiří Hřebec | 5; 7 | 3; 6 | 6; 3 | 6; 4 | 6; 0 |

== Zone B ==
=== Pre-qualifying round ===
==== Draw ====
Pre-qualifying round
Casablanca, Morocco
Morocco | 5
Turkey | 0

==== Results ====
Morocco vs. Turkey

Morocco
5
Casablanca, Morocco
27–29 August 1977

Turkey
0

| | | | 1 | 2 | 3 | 4 | 5 |
|---|---|---|---|---|---|---|---|
| 1 | (Morocco) (Turkey) | Mustapha Dislam; Ali Yenilmez | 6; 3 | 6; 2 | 6; 3 |
| 2 | (Morocco) (Turkey) | Omar Laimina; Remzi Aydın | 6; 1 | 6; 0 | 6; 1 |
| 3 | (Morocco) (Turkey) | Mustapha Dislam / Omar Laimina; Remzi Aydın / Ali Yenilmez | 6; 2 | 6; 0 | 6; 0 |
| 4 | (Morocco) (Turkey) | Houcine Saber; Ali Yenilmez | 6; 3 | 6; 4 | 6; 2 |
| 5 | (Morocco) (Turkey) | Mohammed Dlimi; Cevdet Cika | 6; 0 | 6; 3 | 7; 5 |

=== Preliminary rounds ===
==== Draw ====
First Round
Casablanca, Morocco (clay)
Morocco | 4
Norway | 1
bye
Yugoslavia
Dublin, Ireland (grass)
Ireland | 4
Portugal | 1
bye
Sweden
Hungary
bye
Brussels, Belgium (clay)
Belgium | 3
Denmark | 2
Lucerne, Switzerland
Switzerland | 5
Egypt | 0
bye
West Germany

Qualifying Round
Casablanca, Morocco
Morocco | 0
Yugoslavia | 5
Dublin, Ireland (indoor hard)
Ireland | 0
Sweden | 5
Pécs, Hungary
Hungary | 4
Belgium | 1
Zürich, Switzerland
Switzerland | 0
West Germany | 5

==== First round ====
Morocco vs. Norway

Morocco
4
Casablanca, Morocco
16–18 September 1977
Clay

Norway
1

| | | | 1 | 2 | 3 | 4 | 5 |
|---|---|---|---|---|---|---|---|
| 1 | (Morocco) (Norway) | Houcine Saber; Frithjof Prydz | 6; 2 | 6; 3 | 6; 3 |
| 2 | (Morocco) (Norway) | Omar Laimina; Per Hegna | 7; 5 | 5; 7 | 6; 1 | 3; 6 | 7; 5 |
| 3 | (Morocco) (Norway) | Mustapha Dislam / Mohammed Dlimi; Frithjof Prydz / Erik Ulleberg | 6; 3 | 6; 8 | 6; 8 | 10; 8 | 7; 5 |
| 4 | (Morocco) (Norway) | Houcine Saber; Per Hegna | 3; 6 | 1; 6 | 1; 6 |
| 5 | (Morocco) (Norway) | Omar Laimina; Frithjof Prydz | 6; 2 | 6; 2 | 6; 2 |

Ireland vs. Portugal

Ireland
4
Fitzwilliam Lawn Tennis Club, Dublin, Ireland
16–18 September 1977
Grass

Portugal
1

| | | | 1 | 2 | 3 | 4 | 5 |
|---|---|---|---|---|---|---|---|
| 1 | (Republic of Ireland) (Portugal) | Kevin Menton; Arsénio Marta | 6; 2 | 7; 5 | 4; 6 | 4; 6 | 6; 3 |
| 2 | (Republic of Ireland) (Portugal) | Sean Sorensen; Sergio Cruz | 6; 2 | 6; 4 | 10; 8 |
| 3 | (Republic of Ireland) (Portugal) | Michael Hickey / Sean Sorensen; Manuel de Sousa / Miguel Soares | 6; 1 | 6; 2 | 6; 2 |
| 4 | (Republic of Ireland) (Portugal) | Kevin Menton; Sergio Cruz | 5; 7 | 4; 6 | 4; 6 |
| 5 | (Republic of Ireland) (Portugal) | Sean Sorensen; Arsénio Marta | 6; 0 | 6; 2 | 6; 4 |

Belgium vs. Denmark

Belgium
3
Brussels, Belgium
16–18 September 1977
Clay

Denmark
2

| | | | 1 | 2 | 3 | 4 | 5 |
|---|---|---|---|---|---|---|---|
| 1 | (Belgium) (Denmark) | Thierry Stevaux; Lars Elvstrøm | 6; 3 | 6; 0 | 1; 6 | 4; 6 | 6; 8 |
| 2 | (Belgium) (Denmark) | Bernard Boileau; Torben Ulrich | 5; 7 | 3; 6 | 6; 2 | 6; 3 | 6; 4 |
| 3 | (Belgium) (Denmark) | Bernard Boileau / Thierry Stevaux; Tom Christensen / Lars Elvstrøm | 2; 6 | 7; 5 | 3; 6 | 3; 6 |
| 4 | (Belgium) (Denmark) | Thierry Stevaux; Torben Ulrich | 6; 3 | 6; 1 | 6; 3 |
| 5 | (Belgium) (Denmark) | Bernard Boileau; Lars Elvstrøm | 6; 2 | 6; 2 | 6; 1 |

Switzerland vs. Egypt

Switzerland
5
Lucerne, Switzerland
16–18 September 1977

Egypt
0

| | | | 1 | 2 | 3 | 4 | 5 |
|---|---|---|---|---|---|---|---|
| 1 | (Switzerland) (Egypt) | Max Hürlimann; Tarek-Shawki El Sakka | 6; 0 | 6; 1 | 6; 3 |
| 2 | (Switzerland) (Egypt) | Heinz Günthardt; Mohammed-Abdul Fatah | 6; 0 | 6; 1 | 6; 2 |
| 3 | (Switzerland) (Egypt) | Petr Kanderal / Dimitri Sturdza; Tarek-Shawki El Sakka / Mohammed-Abdul Fatah | 6; 1 | 6; 1 | 6; 3 |
| 4 | (Switzerland) (Egypt) | Heinz Günthardt; Tarek-Shawki El Sakka | 6; 1 | 6; 0 | 6; 0 |
| 5 | (Switzerland) (Egypt) | Petr Kanderal; Mohammed-Abdul Fatah | 6; 0 | 4; 6 | 10; 8 | 7; 5 |

==== Qualifying round ====
Morocco vs. Yugoslavia

Morocco
0
Casablanca, Morocco
17–19 March 1978

Yugoslavia
5

| | | | 1 | 2 | 3 | 4 | 5 |
|---|---|---|---|---|---|---|---|
| 1 | (Morocco) (Socialist Federal Republic of Yugoslavia) | Omar Laimina; Dragan Savić | 6; 4 | 2; 6 | 2; 6 | 4; 6 |
| 2 | (Morocco) (Socialist Federal Republic of Yugoslavia) | Mustapha Dislam; Zoltan Ilin | 0; 6 | 4; 6 | 2; 6 |
| 3 | (Morocco) (Socialist Federal Republic of Yugoslavia) | Mustapha Dislam / Mohammed Dlimi; Zoltan Ilin / Dragan Savić | 5; 7 | 4; 6 | 6; 8 |
| 4 | (Morocco) (Socialist Federal Republic of Yugoslavia) | Mustapha Dislam; Dragan Savić | 4; 6 | 2; 6 | 2; 6 |
| 5 | (Morocco) (Socialist Federal Republic of Yugoslavia) | Omar Laimina; Zoltan Ilin | 6; 4 | 3; 6 | 1; 6 | 0; 6 |

Ireland vs. Sweden

Ireland
0
Fitzwilliam Lawn Tennis Club, Dublin, Ireland
17–19 March 1978
Hard (indoors)

Sweden
5

| | | | 1 | 2 | 3 | 4 | 5 |
|---|---|---|---|---|---|---|---|
| 1 | (Republic of Ireland) (Sweden) | Michael Hickey; Björn Borg | 1; 6 | 1; 6 | 0; 6 |
| 2 | (Republic of Ireland) (Sweden) | Sean Sorensen; Kjell Johansson | 6; 3 | 6; 3 | 7; 9 | 3; 6 | 2; 6 |
| 3 | (Republic of Ireland) (Sweden) | Michael Hickey / Sean Sorensen; Ove Bengtson / Tenny Svensson | 6; 4 | 2; 6 | 4; 6 | 1; 6 |
| 4 | (Republic of Ireland) (Sweden) | Sean Sorensen; Björn Borg | 0; 6 | 2; 6 | 0; 6 |
| 5 | (Republic of Ireland) (Sweden) | Kevin Menton; Kjell Johansson | 0; 6 | 0; 6 | 0; 6 |

Hungary vs. Belgium

Hungary
4
Pécs, Hungary
17–19 March 1978

Belgium
1

| | | | 1 | 2 | 3 | 4 | 5 |
|---|---|---|---|---|---|---|---|
| 1 | (Hungary) (Belgium) | Péter Szőke; Bernard Boileau | 7; 5 | 6; 4 | 6; 1 |
| 2 | (Hungary) (Belgium) | Balázs Taróczy; Patrick Hombergen | 12; 10 | 6; 3 | 6; 3 |
| 3 | (Hungary) (Belgium) | Péter Szőke / Balázs Taróczy; Bernard Boileau / Thierry Stevaux | 6; 3 | 8; 10 | 6; 2 | 6; 1 |
| 4 | (Hungary) (Belgium) | Péter Szőke; Patrick Hombergen | 6; 3 | 6; 2 | 6; 2 |
| 5 | (Hungary) (Belgium) | János Benyik; Bernard Boileau | 6; 3 | 4; 6 | 1; 6 | 6; 3 | 3; 6 |

Switzerland vs. West Germany

Switzerland
0
Zürich, Switzerland
17–19 March 1978

West Germany
5

| | | | 1 | 2 | 3 | 4 | 5 |
|---|---|---|---|---|---|---|---|
| 1 | (Switzerland) (West Germany) | Michel Burgener; Peter Elter | 4; 6 | 3; 6 | 2; 6 |
| 2 | (Switzerland) (West Germany) | Heinz Günthardt; Ulrich Pinner | 10; 8 | 6; 4 | 2; 6 | 4; 6 | 6; 8 |
| 3 | (Switzerland) (West Germany) | Petr Kanderal / Dimitri Sturdza; Ulrich Pinner / Reinhart Probst | 4; 6 | 2; 6 | 3; 6 |
| 4 | (Switzerland) (West Germany) | Michel Burgener; Ulrich Pinner | 6; 2 | 4; 6 | 4; 6 | 2; 6 |
| 5 | (Switzerland) (West Germany) | Heinz Günthardt; Peter Elter | 3; 6 | 7; 9 | 6; 2 | 7; 9 |

=== Main draw ===
==== Draw ====
Quarterfinals; 13–18 June
Spain
bye
Belgrade, Yugoslavia (clay)
Yugoslavia | 2
Sweden | 3
Budapest, Hungary
Hungary | 3
West Germany | 2
bye
Italy

Semifinals; 13–16 July
Båstad, Sweden (clay)
Spain | 2
Sweden | 3
Budapest, Hungary
Hungary | 4
Italy | 1

Final; 15–17 September
Båstad, Sweden (clay)
Sweden | 3
Hungary | 1

==== Quarterfinals ====
Yugoslavia vs. Sweden

Yugoslavia
2
Partizan Stadium, Belgrade, Yugoslavia
13–15 June 1978
Clay

Sweden
3

| | | | 1 | 2 | 3 | 4 | 5 |
|---|---|---|---|---|---|---|---|
| 1 | (Socialist Federal Republic of Yugoslavia) (Sweden) | Željko Franulović; Kjell Johansson | 3; 6 | 11; 9 | 7; 5 | 7; 5 |
| 2 | (Socialist Federal Republic of Yugoslavia) (Sweden) | Zoltan Ilin; Björn Borg | 0; 6 | 0; 6 | 2; 6 |
| 3 | (Socialist Federal Republic of Yugoslavia) (Sweden) | Željko Franulović / Zoltan Ilin; Ove Bengtson / Björn Borg | 6; 4 | 2; 6 | 0; 6 | 0; 6 |
| 4 | (Socialist Federal Republic of Yugoslavia) (Sweden) | Zoltan Ilin; Tenny Svensson | 4; 6 | 6; 4 | 3; 6 | 6; 0 | 6; 3 |
| 5 | (Socialist Federal Republic of Yugoslavia) (Sweden) | Željko Franulović; Björn Borg | 2; 6 | 2; 6 | 7; 9 |

Hungary vs. West Germany

Hungary
3
Budapest, Hungary
16–18 June 1978

West Germany
2

| | | | 1 | 2 | 3 | 4 | 5 |
|---|---|---|---|---|---|---|---|
| 1 | (Hungary) (West Germany) | Balázs Taróczy; Ulrich Pinner | 6; 1 | 6; 2 | 6; 1 |
| 2 | (Hungary) (West Germany) | Péter Szőke; Peter Elter | 6; 4 | 4; 6 | 2; 6 | 3; 6 |
| 3 | (Hungary) (West Germany) | Péter Szőke / Balázs Taróczy; Ulrich Pinner / Reinhart Probst | 6; 1 | 4; 6 | 7; 5 | 6; 2 |
| 4 | (Hungary) (West Germany) | Balázs Taróczy; Peter Elter | 6; 0 | 6; 1 | 6; 4 |
| 5 | (Hungary) (West Germany) | Péter Szőke; Ulrich Pinner | 2; 6 | 2; 6 | 3; 6 |

==== Semifinals ====
Sweden vs. Spain

Sweden
3
Båstad Tennis Stadium, Båstad, Sweden
14–16 July 1978
Clay

Spain
2

| | | | 1 | 2 | 3 | 4 | 5 |
|---|---|---|---|---|---|---|---|
| 1 | (Sweden) (Spain) | Kjell Johansson; José Higueras | 6; 2 | 6; 2 | 5; 7 | 6; 2 |
| 2 | (Sweden) (Spain) | Björn Borg; Manuel Orantes | 6; 2 | 5; 7 | 6; 3 | 6; 3 |
| 3 | (Sweden) (Spain) | Ove Bengtson / Björn Borg; José Higueras / Manuel Orantes | 6; 3 | 2; 6 | 2; 6 | 4; 6 |
| 4 | (Sweden) (Spain) | Kjell Johansson; Manuel Orantes | 4; 6 | 4; 6 | 5; 7 |
| 5 | (Sweden) (Spain) | Björn Borg; José Higueras | 6; 1 | 6; 4 | 6; 2 |

Hungary vs. Italy

Hungary
4
Budapest, Hungary
13–15 July 1978

Italy
1

| | | | 1 | 2 | 3 | 4 | 5 |
|---|---|---|---|---|---|---|---|
| 1 | (Hungary) (Italy) | Péter Szőke; Corrado Barazzutti | 6; 2 | 1; 6 | 5; 7 | 3; 6 |
| 2 | (Hungary) (Italy) | Balázs Taróczy; Adriano Panatta | 6; 4 | 6; 3 | 11; 9 |
| 3 | (Hungary) (Italy) | Péter Szőke / Balázs Taróczy; Paolo Bertolucci / Adriano Panatta | 6; 3 | 6; 2 | 6; 4 |
| 4 | (Hungary) (Italy) | Péter Szőke; Adriano Panatta | 6; 3 | 3; 6 | 6; 0 | 8; 6 |
| 5 | (Hungary) (Italy) | Balázs Taróczy; Corrado Barazzutti | 6; 3 | 6; 4 | 6; 4 |

==== Final ====
Sweden vs. Hungary

Sweden
3
Båstad Tennis Stadium, Båstad, Sweden
15–17 September 1978
Clay

Hungary
1

| | | | 1 | 2 | 3 | 4 | 5 |
|---|---|---|---|---|---|---|---|---|
| 1 | (Sweden) (Hungary) | Kjell Johansson; Balázs Taróczy | 7; 5 | 6; 2 | 6; 4 |
| 2 | (Sweden) (Hungary) | Björn Borg; Péter Szőke | 6; 2 | 6; 0 | 6; 0 |
| 3 | (Sweden) (Hungary) | Ove Bengtson / Tenny Svensson; Péter Szőke / Balázs Taróczy | 2; 6 | 1; 6 | 10; 12 |
| 4 | (Sweden) (Hungary) | Kjell Johansson; Péter Szőke | 3; 6 | 7; 5 | 6; 1 | 3; 6 | 6; 1 |
| 5 | (Sweden) (Hungary) | Tenny Svensson; Balázs Taróczy | 2; 6 | 6; 4 | 5; 5 | | | not completed |
