= 1981 Davis Cup Europe Zone =

International tennis competition

The Europe Zone was one of the three regional zones of the 1981 Davis Cup.

23 teams entered the Europe Zone in total, split across two sub-zones. With the introduction of a new tiered format, the previous year's sub-zonal semifinalists bypassed Zonal competition and qualified directly for the new 16-team World Group. The remaining teams would now compete for two places in the following year's World Group.

Spain defeated Hungary in the Zone A final, and the Soviet Union defeated the Netherlands in the Zone B final, resulting in both Spain and the Soviet Union being promoted to the 1982 World Group.

== Participating nations ==
Zone A:

- Algeria
- Egypt
- Greece
- Hungary
- Israel
- Monaco
- Morocco
- Poland
- Spain
- Yugoslavia
- Zimbabwe

Zone B:

- Austria
- Belgium
- Bulgaria
- Denmark
- Finland
- Ireland
- Luxembourg
- Netherlands
- Norway
- Portugal
- Soviet Union
- Turkey

== Zone A ==
=== Draw ===
First round 8–10 May
Spain
bye
Zimbabwe
Algeria | w/o
Poland
bye
Monte Carlo, Monaco (clay)
Morocco | 1
Monaco | 3
Hungary
bye
Cairo, Egypt (clay)
Egypt | 5
Greece | 0
Yugoslavia
bye
bye
Israel

Quarterfinals; 12-14 June
Algiers, Algeria (clay)
Spain | 5
Algeria | 0
Monte Carlo, Monaco (clay)
Poland | 2
Monaco | 3
Cairo, Egypt (clay)
Hungary | 4
Egypt | 1
Skopje, Yugoslavia (clay)
Yugoslavia | 1
Israel | 4

Semifinals; 10-12 July
Lleida, Spain (clay)
Spain | 5
Monaco | 0
Ramat HaSharon, Israel (hard)
Hungary | 3
Israel | 2

Final; 18-20 September
Avilés, Spain (clay)
Spain | 3
Hungary | 2

=== First round ===
==== Monaco vs. Morocco ====
Monaco
3
Monte Carlo, Monaco
8–10 May 1981
Clay

Morocco
1

| | | | 1 | 2 | 3 | 4 | 5 |
|---|---|---|---|---|---|---|---|---|
| 1 | (Monaco) (Morocco) | Bernard Balleret; Mustapha Dislam | 6; 4 | 1; 6 | 6; 4 | 6; 1 |
| 2 | (Monaco) (Morocco) | Louis Borfiga; Mohammed Dlimi | 6; 8 | 6; 2 | 6; 8 | 5; 7 |
| 3 | (Monaco) (Morocco) | Bernard Balleret / Michel Borfiga; Mohammed Dlimi / Houcine Saber | 13; 11 | 8; 6 | 6; 4 |
| 4 | (Monaco) (Morocco) | Louis Borfiga; Mustapha Dislam | 2; 6 | 6; 4 | 1; 6 | 7; 5 | 6; 1 |
| 5 | (Monaco) (Morocco) | Bernard Balleret; Mohammed Dlimi | 3; 6 | 5; 2 | | | | not completed |

==== Egypt vs. Greece ====
Egypt
5
Gezira Sporting Club, Cairo, Egypt
8–10 May 1981
Clay

Greece
0

| | | | 1 | 2 | 3 | 4 | 5 |
|---|---|---|---|---|---|---|---|
| 1 | (Egypt) (Greece) | Tarek-Shawki El Sakka; Nicholas Kalogeropoulos | 6; 4 | 6; 3 | 6; 8 | 6; 2 |
| 2 | (Egypt) (Greece) | Ismail El Shafei; George Kalovelonis | 6; 4 | 6; 4 | 6; 4 |
| 3 | (Egypt) (Greece) | Tarek-Shawki El Sakka / Ismail El Shafei; Nicholas Kalogeropoulos / George Kalovelonis | 6; 3 | 6; 4 | 3; 6 | 6; 3 |
| 4 | (Egypt) (Greece) | Tarek-Shawki El Sakka; George Kalovelonis | 11; 9 | 7; 5 |
| 5 | (Egypt) (Greece) | Ismail El Shafei; Nicholas Kalogeropoulos | 6; 1 | 6; 3 |

=== Quarterfinals ===
==== Algeria vs. Spain ====
Algeria
0
Tennis Club Bachdjarah, Algiers, Algeria
12-14 June 1981
Clay

Spain
5

| | | | 1 | 2 | 3 | 4 | 5 |
|---|---|---|---|---|---|---|---|
| 1 | (Algeria) (Spain) | Yassine Amier; José García Requena | 1; 6 | 2; 6 | 0; 6 |
| 2 | (Algeria) (Spain) | Djamel Boudjemline; José López-Maeso | 6; 8 | 1; 6 | 1; 6 |
| 3 | (Algeria) (Spain) | Yassine Amier / Djamel Boudjemline; José López-Maeso / Miguel Mir | 4; 6 | 1; 6 | 6; 8 |
| 4 | (Algeria) (Spain) | Djamel Boudjemline; José García Requena | 3; 6 | 1; 6 | 6; 8 |
| 5 | (Algeria) (Spain) | Yassine Amier; Sergio Casal | 0; 6 | 4; 6 | 0; 6 |

==== Monaco vs. Poland ====
Monaco
3
Monte Carlo, Monaco
12–14 June 1981
Clay

Poland
2

| | | | 1 | 2 | 3 | 4 | 5 |
|---|---|---|---|---|---|---|---|
| 1 | (Monaco) (Poland) | Bernard Balleret; Tadeusz Nowicki | 2; 6 | 6; 3 | 7; 5 | 3; 6 | 6; 4 |
| 2 | (Monaco) (Poland) | Louis Borfiga; Czesław Dobrowolski | 5; 7 | 6; 1 | 2; 6 | 6; 1 | 6; 0 |
| 3 | (Monaco) (Poland) | Bernard Balleret / Louis Borfiga; Henryk Drzymalski / Tadeusz Nowicki | 2; 6 | 5; 7 | 1; 6 |
| 4 | (Monaco) (Poland) | Louis Borfiga; Tadeusz Nowicki | 8; 6 | 2; 6 | 0; 6 | 4; 6 |
| 5 | (Monaco) (Poland) | Bernard Balleret; Czesław Dobrowolski | 2; 6 | 9; 7 | 6; 3 | 6; 1 |

==== Egypt vs. Hungary ====
Egypt
1
Gezira Sporting Club, Cairo, Egypt
12–14 June 1981
Clay

Hungary
4

| | | | 1 | 2 | 3 | 4 | 5 |
|---|---|---|---|---|---|---|---|
| 1 | (Egypt) (Hungary) | Tarek-Shawki El Sakka; Róbert Machán | 3; 6 | 1; 6 | 5; 7 |
| 2 | (Egypt) (Hungary) | Ismail El Shafei; Balázs Taróczy | 7; 9 | 4; 6 | 4; 6 |
| 3 | (Egypt) (Hungary) | Tarek-Shawki El Sakka / Ismail El Shafei; Péter Szőke / Balázs Taróczy | 4; 6 | 6; 8 | 4; 6 |
| 4 | (Egypt) (Hungary) | Khaled Baligh; Róbert Machán | 1; 6 | 1; 6 |
| 5 | (Egypt) (Hungary) | Tarek-Shawki El Sakka; János Benyik | 3; 6 | 6; 1 | 6; 3 |

==== Yugoslavia vs. Israel ====
Yugoslavia
1
Tennis Club Jug, Skopje, Yugoslavia
12–14 June 1981
Clay

Israel
4

| | | | 1 | 2 | 3 | 4 | 5 |
|---|---|---|---|---|---|---|---|
| 1 | (Socialist Federal Republic of Yugoslavia) (Israel) | Zoltan Ilin; Shlomo Glickstein | 1; 6 | 4; 6 | 4; 6 |
| 2 | (Socialist Federal Republic of Yugoslavia) (Israel) | Slobodan Živojinović; David Schneider | 4; 6 | 4; 6 | 8; 10 |
| 3 | (Socialist Federal Republic of Yugoslavia) (Israel) | Dragan Savić / Slobodan Živojinović; Shlomo Glickstein / David Schneider | 3; 6 | 4; 6 | 5; 7 |
| 4 | (Socialist Federal Republic of Yugoslavia) (Israel) | Zoltan Ilin; Shahar Perkiss | 6; 3 | 6; 2 | 3; 6 | 3; 6 | 6; 0 |
| 5 | (Socialist Federal Republic of Yugoslavia) (Israel) | Branko Horvat; Shlomo Glickstein | 6; 3 | 2; 6 | 1; 6 | 2; 6 |

=== Semifinals ===
==== Spain vs. Monaco ====
Spain
5
Club Tennis Lleida, Lleida, Spain
10-12 July 1981
Clay

Monaco
0

| | | | 1 | 2 | 3 | 4 | 5 |
|---|---|---|---|---|---|---|---|
| 1 | (Spain) (Monaco) | Ángel Giménez; Bernard Balleret | 6; 3 | 6; 4 | 6; 1 |
| 2 | (Spain) (Monaco) | Fernando Luna; Louis Borfiga | 6; 0 | 6; 1 | 6; 2 |
| 3 | (Spain) (Monaco) | Sergio Casal / José López-Maeso; Bernard Balleret / Michel Borfiga | 7; 5 | 6; 1 | 6; 1 |
| 4 | (Spain) (Monaco) | José López-Maeso; Louis Borfiga | 6; 2 | 6; 4 | 6; 0 |
| 5 | (Spain) (Monaco) | Fernando Luna; Jacques Vinciléoni | 6; 1 | 6; 4 |

==== Israel vs. Hungary ====
Israel
2
Canada Stadium, Ramat HaSharon, Israel
10-12 July 1981
Hard

Hungary
3

| | | | 1 | 2 | 3 | 4 | 5 |
|---|---|---|---|---|---|---|---|
| 1 | (Israel) (Hungary) | David Schneider; Róbert Machán | 6; 3 | 2; 6 | 2; 6 | 8; 6 | 5; 7 |
| 2 | (Israel) (Hungary) | Shlomo Glickstein; Balázs Taróczy | 7; 9 | 6; 1 | 6; 3 | 6; 1 |
| 3 | (Israel) (Hungary) | Shlomo Glickstein / David Schneider; Péter Szőke / Balázs Taróczy | 6; 3 | 7; 9 | 6; 3 | 4; 6 | 4; 6 |
| 4 | (Israel) (Hungary) | David Schneider; Balázs Taróczy | 3; 6 | 3; 6 | 2; 6 |
| 5 | (Israel) (Hungary) | Shlomo Glickstein; Róbert Machán | 6; 0 | 6; 4 |

=== Final ===
==== Spain vs. Hungary ====
Spain
3
Club de Tenis Avilés, Avilés, Spain
18-20 September 1981
Clay

Hungary
2

| | | | 1 | 2 | 3 | 4 | 5 |
|---|---|---|---|---|---|---|---|
| 1 | (Spain) (Hungary) | Fernando Luna; Balázs Taróczy | 4; 6 | 3; 6 | 3; 6 |
| 2 | (Spain) (Hungary) | José López-Maeso; Róbert Machán | 6; 1 | 4; 6 | 6; 1 | 9; 7 |
| 3 | (Spain) (Hungary) | Sergio Casal / Ángel Giménez; Péter Szőke / Balázs Taróczy | 4; 6 | 8; 6 | 10; 8 | 6; 3 |
| 4 | (Spain) (Hungary) | José López-Maeso; Balázs Taróczy | 6; 3 | 1; 6 | 5; 7 | 3; 6 |
| 5 | (Spain) (Hungary) | Fernando Luna; Róbert Machán | 3; 6 | 10; 8 | 6; 0 | 6; 2 |

== Zone B ==
=== Draw ===
First round 8–10 May
Austria
bye
Aarhus, Denmark (clay)
Denmark | 5
Portugal | 0
Soviet Union
bye
Belgium | w/o
Turkey
Finland
bye
Mondorf-les-Bains, Luxembourg (clay)
Luxembourg | 0
Bulgaria | 5
Netherlands
bye
Oslo, Norway (clay)
Norway | 2
Ireland | 3

Quarterfinals; 12–14 June
Salzburg, Austria (clay)
Austria | 3
Denmark | 2
Jūrmala, Soviet Union (clay)
Soviet Union | 4
Belgium | 1
Helsinki, Finland (clay)
Finland | 3
Bulgaria | 2
Eindhoven, Netherlands (clay)
Netherlands | 4
Ireland | 1

Semifinals; 9–11 July
Pörtschach, Austria (clay)
Austria | 0
Soviet Union | 4
Helsinki, Finland (clay)
Finland | 0
Netherlands | 5

Final; 25–27 September
Jūrmala, Soviet Union (clay)
Soviet Union | 5
Netherlands | 0

=== First round ===
==== Denmark vs. Portugal ====
Denmark
5
Aarhus, Denmark
8–10 May 1981
Clay

Portugal
0

| | | | 1 | 2 | 3 | 4 | 5 |
|---|---|---|---|---|---|---|---|
| 1 | (Denmark) (Portugal) | Peter Bastiansen; Miguel Soares | 6; 2 | 6; 0 | 6; 2 |
| 2 | (Denmark) (Portugal) | Michael Mortensen; José Manuel Cordeiro | 4; 6 | 6; 4 | 6; 0 | 4; 6 | 10; 8 |
| 3 | (Denmark) (Portugal) | Peter Bastiansen / Michael Mortensen; José Manuel Cordeiro / Pedro Cordeiro | 6; 1 | 11; 9 | 6; 4 |
| 4 | (Denmark) (Portugal) | Peter Bastiansen; José Manuel Cordeiro | 6; 0 | 6; 1 | 6; 0 |
| 5 | (Denmark) (Portugal) | Michael Mortensen; Miguel Soares | 6; 3 | 6; 1 | 6; 0 |

==== Luxembourg vs. Bulgaria ====
Luxembourg
0
Tennis Club de Mondorf, Mondorf-les-Bains, Luxembourg
8–10 May 1981
Clay

Bulgaria
5

| | | | 1 | 2 | 3 | 4 | 5 |
|---|---|---|---|---|---|---|---|
| 1 | (Luxembourg) (Bulgaria) | Anatol Navrotchi; Julian Stamatov | 1; 6 | 1; 6 | 3; 6 |
| 2 | (Luxembourg) (Bulgaria) | Johny Goudenbour; Bozhidar Pampoulov | 6; 8 | 2; 6 | 2; 6 |
| 3 | (Luxembourg) (Bulgaria) | Johny Goudenbour / Anatol Navrotchi; Bozhidar Pampoulov / Matei Pampoulov | 2; 6 | 3; 6 | 9; 11 |
| 4 | (Luxembourg) (Bulgaria) | Johny Goudenbour; Julian Stamatov | 6; 8 | 5; 7 | 2; 6 |
| 5 | (Luxembourg) (Bulgaria) | Fernand Claude; Matei Pampoulov | 5; 7 | 0; 6 | 1; 6 |

==== Norway vs. Ireland ====
Norway
2
Oslo Tennisklubb, Oslo, Norway
8–10 May 1981
Clay

Ireland
3

| | | | 1 | 2 | 3 | 4 | 5 |
|---|---|---|---|---|---|---|---|
| 1 | (Norway) (Republic of Ireland) | Per Hegna; Peter Hannon | 6; 3 | 6; 1 | 6; 4 |
| 2 | (Norway) (Republic of Ireland) | Thomas Randby; Matt Doyle | 2; 6 | 3; 6 | 0; 6 |
| 3 | (Norway) (Republic of Ireland) | Per Hegna / Bjørn Naume; Matt Doyle / Sean Sorensen | 1; 6 | 0; 6 | 2; 6 |
| 4 | (Norway) (Republic of Ireland) | Per Hegna; Matt Doyle | 2; 6 | 2; 6 | 4; 6 |
| 5 | (Norway) (Republic of Ireland) | Thomas Randby; Peter Hannon | 3; 6 | 6; 3 | 2; 6 | 7; 5 | 6; 2 |

=== Quarterfinals ===
==== Austria vs. Denmark ====
Austria
3
Salzburg, Austria
12–14 June 1981
Clay

Denmark
2

| | | | 1 | 2 | 3 | 4 | 5 |
|---|---|---|---|---|---|---|---|
| 1 | (Austria) (Denmark) | Peter Feigl; Michael Mortensen | 6; 3 | 10; 8 | 6; 3 |
| 2 | (Austria) (Denmark) | Hans Kary; Peter Bastiansen | 4; 6 | 6; 3 | 6; 2 | 6; 1 |
| 3 | (Austria) (Denmark) | Peter Feigl / Hans Kary; Peter Bastiansen / Michael Mortensen | 6; 3 | 6; 4 | 1; 6 | 6; 1 |
| 4 | (Austria) (Denmark) | Robert Reininger; Michael Mortensen | 3; 6 | 4; 6 | 3; 6 |
| 5 | (Austria) (Denmark) | Peter Feigl; Peter Bastiansen | 4; 6 | 6; 2 | 4; 6 | 5; 7 |

==== Soviet Union vs. Belgium ====
Soviet Union
4
Jūrmala, Soviet Union
12–14 June 1981
Clay

Belgium
1

| | | | 1 | 2 | 3 | 4 | 5 |
|---|---|---|---|---|---|---|---|
| 1 | (Soviet Union) (Belgium) | Konstantin Pugaev; Bernard Boileau | 4; 6 | 6; 4 | 6; 4 | 6; 1 |
| 2 | (Soviet Union) (Belgium) | Vadim Borisov; Thierry Stevaux | 2; 6 | 6; 4 | 6; 2 | 4; 6 | 6; 3 |
| 3 | (Soviet Union) (Belgium) | Vadim Borisov / Konstantin Pugaev; Bernard Boileau / Alain Brichant | 6; 4 | 7; 9 | 1; 6 | 4; 6 |
| 4 | (Soviet Union) (Belgium) | Konstantin Pugaev; Thierry Stevaux | 5; 7 | 3; 6 | 6; 4 | 6; 0 | 6; 4 |
| 5 | (Soviet Union) (Belgium) | Alexander Zverev; Alain Brichant | 6; 1 | 6; 2 | 6; 4 |

==== Finland vs. Bulgaria ====
Finland
3
Helsinki, Finland
12–14 June 1981
Clay

Bulgaria
2

| | | | 1 | 2 | 3 | 4 | 5 |
|---|---|---|---|---|---|---|---|
| 1 | (Finland) (Bulgaria) | Leo Palin; Lyubomir Petrov | 6; 1 | 6; 2 | 6; 0 |
| 2 | (Finland) (Bulgaria) | Matti Timonen; Julian Stamatov | 8; 10 | 6; 1 | 6; 2 | 5; 7 | 0; 6 |
| 3 | (Finland) (Bulgaria) | Joakim Berner / Leo Palin; Lyubomir Petrov / Julian Stamatov | 7; 5 | 6; 1 | 3; 6 | 5; 7 | 0; 6 |
| 4 | (Finland) (Bulgaria) | Leo Palin; Julian Stamatov | 9; 11 | 6; 2 | 6; 1 | 6; 0 |
| 5 | (Finland) (Bulgaria) | Matti Timonen; Lyubomir Petrov | 6; 3 | 6; 2 | 4; 6 | 3; 6 | 6; 0 |

==== Netherlands vs. Ireland ====
Netherlands
4
Eindhoven, Netherlands
12–14 June 1981
Clay

Ireland
1

| | | | 1 | 2 | 3 | 4 | 5 |
|---|---|---|---|---|---|---|---|
| 1 | (Netherlands) (Republic of Ireland) | Louk Sanders; Matt Doyle | 8; 6 | 2; 6 | 2; 6 | 6; 2 | 6; 2 |
| 2 | (Netherlands) (Republic of Ireland) | Eric Wilborts; Sean Sorensen | 4; 6 | 7; 5 | 6; 4 | 6; 1 |
| 3 | (Netherlands) (Republic of Ireland) | Marc Albert / Huub van Boeckel; Matt Doyle / Sean Sorensen | 3; 6 | 6; 4 | 1; 6 | 2; 6 |
| 4 | (Netherlands) (Republic of Ireland) | Eric Wilborts; Matt Doyle | 6; 4 | 6; 8 | 12; 10 | 6; 4 |
| 5 | (Netherlands) (Republic of Ireland) | Louk Sanders; Sean Sorensen | 6; 3 | 6; 2 |

=== Semifinals ===
==== Austria vs. Soviet Union ====
Austria
0
Werzer Arena, Pörtschach, Austria
9–11 July 1981
Clay

Soviet Union
4

| | | | 1 | 2 | 3 | 4 | 5 |
|---|---|---|---|---|---|---|---|
| 1 | (Austria) (Soviet Union) | Hans Kary; Konstantin Pugaev | 4; 6 | 3; 6 | 1; 6 |
| 2 | (Austria) (Soviet Union) | Ingo Wimmer; Vadim Borisov | 6; 8 | 4; 6 | 4; 6 |
| 3 | (Austria) (Soviet Union) | Hans Kary / Bernhard Pils; Vadim Borisov / Sergey Leonyuk | 4; 6 | 2; 6 | 2; 6 |
| 4 | (Austria) (Soviet Union) | Ingo Wimmer; Konstantin Pugaev | 4; 6 | 2; 6 | 6; 3 | 3; 6 |
| 5 | (Austria) (Soviet Union) | Hans Kary; Vadim Borisov |

==== Finland vs. Netherlands ====
Finland
0
Helsinki, Finland
9–11 July 1981
Clay

Netherlands
5

| | | | 1 | 2 | 3 | 4 | 5 |
|---|---|---|---|---|---|---|---|
| 1 | (Finland) (Netherlands) | Kimmo Alkio; Louk Sanders | 3; 6 | 1; 6 | 1; 6 |
| 2 | (Finland) (Netherlands) | Matti Timonen; Eric Wilborts | 2; 6 | 2; 6 | 7; 9 |
| 3 | (Finland) (Netherlands) | George Berner / Leo Palin; Marc Albert / Huub van Boeckel | 5; 7 | 5; 7 | 2; 6 |
| 4 | (Finland) (Netherlands) | Matti Timonen; Louk Sanders | 6; 4 | 3; 6 | 5; 7 | 4; 6 |
| 5 | (Finland) (Netherlands) | Kimmo Alkio; Eric Wilborts | 6; 3 | 6; 2 | 0; 6 | 2; 6 | 4; 6 |

=== Final ===
==== Soviet Union vs. Netherlands ====
Soviet Union
5
Jūrmala, Soviet Union
25–27 September 1981
Clay

Netherlands
0

| | | | 1 | 2 | 3 | 4 | 5 |
|---|---|---|---|---|---|---|---|
| 1 | (Soviet Union) (Netherlands) | Vadim Borisov; Eric Wilborts | 7; 5 | 4; 6 | 6; 1 | 6; 3 |
| 2 | (Soviet Union) (Netherlands) | Alexander Zverev; Louk Sanders | 6; 4 | 7; 9 | 1; 6 | 9; 7 | 6; 3 |
| 3 | (Soviet Union) (Netherlands) | Vadim Borisov / Konstantin Pugaev; Marc Albert / Tom Okker | 6; 4 | 6; 4 | 6; 2 |
| 4 | (Soviet Union) (Netherlands) | Sergey Leonyuk; Marc Albert | 4; 6 | 9; 7 | 6; 4 | 4; 6 | 6; 4 |
| 5 | (Soviet Union) (Netherlands) | Alexander Zverev; Eric Wilborts | 6; 1 | 6; 3 |
