= 1979 Davis Cup Europe Zone =

International tennis competition

The Europe Zone was one of the three regional zones of the 1979 Davis Cup.

29 teams entered the Europe Zone, competing across 2 sub-zones. 25 teams entered the competition in the qualifying round, competing for 4 places in each sub-zone's main draw to join the 4 finalists from the 1978 Europe Zone. The winners of each sub-zone's main draw went on to compete in the Inter-Zonal Zone against the winners of the Americas Zone and Eastern Zone.

Italy defeated Great Britain in the Zone A final, and Czechoslovakia defeated Sweden in the Zone B final, resulting in both Italy and Czechoslovakia progressing to the Inter-Zonal Zone.

== Zone A ==
=== Preliminary rounds ===
==== Draw ====
First Round
Poland
bye
Helsinki, Finland
Finland	5
Morocco	0
Italy
bye
Athens, Greece (clay)
Greece	1
Denmark	4
Austria
bye
Cairo, Egypt (clay)
Egypt	5
Portugal	0
Spain
bye
Monte Carlo, Monaco
Monaco	1
Soviet Union	4

Qualifying Round
Warsaw, Poland
Poland	4
Finland	1
Palermo, Italy (clay)
Italy	5
Denmark	0
Vienna, Austria
Austria	5
Egypt	0
Barcelona, Spain
Spain	5
Soviet Union	0

==== First round ====
Finland vs. Morocco

Finland
5
Helsinki, Finland
15–17 September 1978

Morocco
0

			1	2	3	4	5
1	(Finland) (Morocco)	Leo Palin; Mustapha Dislam	6; 4	6; 2	6; 1
2	(Finland) (Morocco)	Matti Timonen; Omar Laimina	6; 2	8; 6	4; 6	6; 1
3	(Finland) (Morocco)	Leo Palin / Reijo Tuomola; Mustapha Dislam / Omar Laimina	6; 3	6; 1	6; 1
4	(Finland) (Morocco)	Leo Palin; Omar Laimina	6; 2	6; 2	6; 4
5	(Finland) (Morocco)	Matti Timonen; Mustapha Dislam	6; 1	6; 1	6; 3

Greece vs. Denmark

Greece
1
Athens, Greece
15–17 September 1978
Clay

Denmark
4

			1	2	3	4	5
1	(Greece) (Denmark)	Nicholas Kalogeropoulos; Lars Elvstrøm	3; 6	0; 1				retired
2	(Greece) (Denmark)	Nicolas Kelaidis; Finn Christensen	11; 9	6; 2	1; 6	4; 6	2; 6
3	(Greece) (Denmark)	George Kalovelonis / Pavlos Mamasis; Finn Christensen / Lars Elvstrøm	4; 6	11; 9	6; 3	3; 6	7; 5
4	(Greece) (Denmark)	Nicolas Kelaidis; Lars Elvstrøm	0; 6	2; 6	1; 6
5	(Greece) (Denmark)	Pavlos Mamasis; Finn Christensen	5; 7	5; 7	6; 4	6; 8

Egypt vs. Portugal

Egypt
5
Gezira Sporting Club, Cairo, Egypt
15–17 September 1978
Clay

Portugal
0

			1	2	3	4	5
1	(Egypt) (Portugal)	Abdel-Gawad Mohammed; Sergio Cruz	2; 6	3; 6	6; 3	6; 2	6; 1
2	(Egypt) (Portugal)	Ismail El Shafei; José Vilela	4; 6	6; 1	6; 1	6; 1
3	(Egypt) (Portugal)	Tarek-Shawki El Sakka / Ismail El Shafei; Luís Filipe Silva / José Vilela	7; 5	6; 2	6; 2
4	(Egypt) (Portugal)	Tarek-Shawki El Sakka; Luís Filipe Silva	7; 5	6; 2	6; 4
5	(Egypt) (Portugal)	Ahmed El-Mehelmy; Manuel de Sousa	6; 4	3; 6	6; 3	6; 0

Monaco vs. Soviet Union

Monaco
1
Monte Carlo, Monaco
15–17 September 1978

Soviet Union
4

			1	2	3	4	5
1	(Monaco) (Soviet Union)	Louis Borfiga; Teimuraz Kakulia	1; 6	6; 4	4; 6	3; 6
2	(Monaco) (Soviet Union)	Bernard Balleret; Alex Metreveli	3; 6	6; 3	5; 7	2; 6
3	(Monaco) (Soviet Union)	Bernard Balleret / Michel Borfiga; Teimuraz Kakulia / Alex Metreveli	1; 6	5; 7	4; 6
4	(Monaco) (Soviet Union)	Bernard Balleret; Teimuraz Kakulia	6; 4	2; 6	1; 6	6; 4	6; 3
5	(Monaco) (Soviet Union)	Louis Borfiga; Alex Metreveli	2; 6	2; 6

==== Qualifying round ====
Poland vs. Finland

Poland
4
Warsaw, Poland
16–18 March 1979

Finland
1

			1	2	3	4	5
1	(Poland) (Finland)	Henryk Drzymalski; Leo Palin	2; 6	2; 6	2; 6
2	(Poland) (Finland)	Wojciech Fibak; Matti Timonen	6; 1	6; 2	6; 3
3	(Poland) (Finland)	Wojciech Fibak / Tadeusz Nowicki; George Berner / Leo Palin	6; 3	6; 3	6; 0
4	(Poland) (Finland)	Wojciech Fibak; Leo Palin	6; 0	6; 3	6; 3
5	(Poland) (Finland)	Henryk Drzymalski; Matti Timonen	6; 3	6; 4	7; 5

Italy vs. Denmark

Italy
5
Palermo, Italy
16–18 March 1979
Clay

Denmark
0

			1	2	3	4	5
1	(Italy) (Denmark)	Adriano Panatta; Michael Mortensen	6; 2	6; 0	6; 2
2	(Italy) (Denmark)	Corrado Barazzutti; Carl-Edvard Hedelund	6; 1	6; 1	6; 2
3	(Italy) (Denmark)	Paolo Bertolucci / Adriano Panatta; Carl-Edvard Hedelund / Michael Mortensen	6; 0	6; 8	6; 2	6; 2
4	(Italy) (Denmark)	Corrado Barazzutti; Michael Mortensen	6; 1	6; 1
5	(Italy) (Denmark)	Adriano Panatta; Carl-Edvard Hedelund	6; 0	6; 3	6; 1

Austria vs. Egypt

Austria
5
Vienna, Austria
16–18 March 1979

Egypt
0

			1	2	3	4	5
1	(Austria) (Egypt)	Hans Kary; Ismail El Shafei	6; 3	3; 6	6; 4	6; 2
2	(Austria) (Egypt)	Peter Feigl; Tarek-Shawki El Sakka	11; 9	6; 4	6; 3
3	(Austria) (Egypt)	Peter Feigl / Hans Kary; Tarek-Shawki El Sakka / Ismail El Shafei	7; 5	6; 4	6; 4
4	(Austria) (Egypt)	Peter Feigl; Ismail El Shafei	11; 9	12; 10				retired
5	(Austria) (Egypt)	Hans Kary; Tarek-Shawki El Sakka	6; 4	6; 4	6; 2

Spain vs. Soviet Union

Spain
5
Barcelona, Spain
16–18 March 1979

Soviet Union
0

			1	2	3	4	5
1	(Spain) (Soviet Union)	José Higueras; Alex Metreveli	7; 5	6; 2	6; 0
2	(Spain) (Soviet Union)	Manuel Orantes; Vadim Borisov	6; 3	6; 4	6; 0
3	(Spain) (Soviet Union)	José Higueras / Manuel Orantes; Vadim Borisov / Alex Metreveli	7; 5	6; 2	6; 0
4	(Spain) (Soviet Union)	Antonio Muñoz; Ramiz Akhmerov	8; 6	6; 2
5	(Spain) (Soviet Union)	Fernando Luna; Vadim Borisov	6; 1	6; 4

=== Main draw ===
==== Draw ====
Quarterfinals; 15–17 June
Hungary
bye
Warsaw, Poland
Poland	1
Italy	4
Vienna, Austria
Austria	1
Spain	3
bye
Great Britain

Semifinals; 13–15 July
Rome, Italy (clay)
Hungary	2
Italy	3
Eastbourne, United Kingdom (grass)
Spain	1
Great Britain	4

Final; 14–16 September
Rome, Italy (clay)
Italy	4
Great Britain	1

==== Quarterfinals ====
Poland vs. Italy

Poland
1
Warsaw, Poland
15–17 June 1979

Italy
4

			1	2	3	4	5
1	(Poland) (Italy)	Wojciech Fibak; Adriano Panatta	6; 2	6; 0	2; 6	6; 4
2	(Poland) (Italy)	Henryk Drzymalski; Corrado Barazzutti	3; 6	2; 6	1; 6
3	(Poland) (Italy)	Wojciech Fibak / Tadeusz Nowicki; Corrado Barazzutti / Adriano Panatta	1; 6	6; 4	12; 14	2; 6
4	(Poland) (Italy)	Wojciech Fibak; Corrado Barazzutti	5; 7	7; 5	6; 3	4; 6	2; 6
5	(Poland) (Italy)	Henryk Drzymalski; Adriano Panatta	2; 6	1; 6

Austria vs. Spain

Austria
1
Vienna, Austria
15–17 June 1979

Spain
3

			1	2	3	4	5
1	(Austria) (Spain)	Peter Feigl; José Higueras	6; 3	4; 6	7; 5	11; 9
2	(Austria) (Spain)	Hans Kary; Manuel Orantes	16; 14	8; 10	3; 6	4; 6
3	(Austria) (Spain)	Peter Feigl / Hans Kary; José Higueras / Manuel Orantes	12; 14	6; 8	4; 6
4	(Austria) (Spain)	Peter Feigl; Manuel Orantes	3; 6	15; 17	2; 6
5	(Austria) (Spain)	Hans Kary; José Higueras						not played

==== Semifinals ====
Italy vs. Hungary

Italy
3
Foro Italico, Rome, Italy
13–15 July 1979
Clay

Hungary
2

			1	2	3	4	5
1	(Italy) (Hungary)	Adriano Panatta; Péter Szőke	6; 2	6; 0	6; 3
2	(Italy) (Hungary)	Corrado Barazzutti; Balázs Taróczy	9; 7	6; 2	3; 6	7; 5
3	(Italy) (Hungary)	Paolo Bertolucci / Adriano Panatta; Péter Szőke / Balázs Taróczy	3; 6	6; 3	0; 6	6; 8
4	(Italy) (Hungary)	Corrado Barazzutti; Péter Szőke	6; 4	6; 1	6; 1
5	(Italy) (Hungary)	Antonio Zugarelli; Balázs Taróczy	4; 6	3; 6

Great Britain vs. Spain

Great Britain
4
Devonshire Park Lawn Tennis Club, Eastbourne, United Kingdom
13–15 July 1979
Grass

Spain
1

			1	2	3	4	5
1	(United Kingdom) (Spain)	Buster Mottram; José Higueras	6; 2	6; 3	6; 0
2	(United Kingdom) (Spain)	John Lloyd; Manuel Orantes	7; 5	6; 1	3; 6	6; 2
3	(United Kingdom) (Spain)	Mark Cox / David Lloyd; José Higueras / Manuel Orantes	2; 6	6; 2	6; 4	6; 4
4	(United Kingdom) (Spain)	John Lloyd; José Higueras	3; 6	0; 6	4; 6
5	(United Kingdom) (Spain)	Mark Cox; Antonio Muñoz	6; 1	6; 3	6; 2

==== Final ====
Italy vs. Great Britain

Italy
4
Foro Italico, Rome, Italy
14–16 September 1979
Clay

Great Britain
1

			1	2	3	4	5
1	(Italy) (United Kingdom)	Adriano Panatta; Buster Mottram	0; 6	4; 6	4; 6
2	(Italy) (United Kingdom)	Corrado Barazzutti; John Lloyd	6; 1	6; 4	6; 4
3	(Italy) (United Kingdom)	Corrado Barazzutti / Antonio Zugarelli; Mark Cox / David Lloyd	7; 5	10; 8	6; 1
4	(Italy) (United Kingdom)	Adriano Panatta; John Lloyd	6; 3	6; 2	6; 3
5	(Italy) (United Kingdom)	Corrado Barazzutti; Buster Mottram	8; 6	7; 5

== Zone B ==
=== Pre-qualifying round ===
==== Draw ====
Pre-qualifying round
Ankara, Turkey
Turkey	0
Iran	5

==== Results ====
Turkey vs. Iran

Turkey
0
Ankara, Turkey
August 1978

Iran
5

			1	2	3	4	5
1	(Turkey) (Iran)	Hakkı Özgenel; Mansour Bahrami	0; 6	1; 6	0; 6
2	(Turkey) (Iran)	Kemal Anbar; Moharram-Ali Khodai	1; 6	4; 6	2; 6
3	(Turkey) (Iran)	Kemal Anbar / Murat Gürler; Mansour Bahrami / Kamyab Derafshijavan	4; 6	2; 6	7; 9
4	(Turkey) (Iran)	Hakkı Özgenel; Hussain Akbari	6; 4	3; 6	3; 6	4; 6
5	(Turkey) (Iran)	Kemal Anbar; Mansour Bahrami	0; 6	6; 4	7; 5	2; 6	4; 6

=== Preliminary rounds ===
==== Draw ====
First Round
Amersfoort, Netherlands (clay)
Netherlands	4
Norway	1
bye
France
Geneva, Switzerland
Switzerland	3
Iran	2
bye
Yugoslavia
Israel	w/o
Nigeria
bye
West Germany
Brussels, Belgium
Belgium	5
Ireland	0
bye
Romania

Qualifying Round
Amsterdam, Netherlands (indoor carpet)
Netherlands	2
France	3
Zürich, Switzerland
Switzerland	4
Yugoslavia	1
Augsburg, West Germany
Israel	2
West Germany	3
Brussels, Belgium
Belgium	1
Romania	4

==== First round ====
Netherlands vs. Norway

Netherlands
4
Amersfoort, Netherlands
15–17 September 1978
Clay

Norway
1

			1	2	3	4	5
1	(Netherlands) (Norway)	Rolf Thung; Per Hegna	8; 6	5; 7	2; 6	2; 6
2	(Netherlands) (Norway)	Louk Sanders; John Erik Rustad	6; 3	6; 1	6; 1
3	(Netherlands) (Norway)	Wouter Fok / Louk Sanders; Per Hegna / Frithjof Prydz	6; 2	6; 4	6; 1
4	(Netherlands) (Norway)	Rolf Thung; John Erik Rustad	6; 3	6; 3	6; 3
5	(Netherlands) (Norway)	Louk Sanders; Per Hegna	3; 6	3; 6	6; 2	6; 4	6; 0

Switzerland vs. Iran

Switzerland
3
Geneva, Switzerland
15–17 September 1978

Iran
2

			1	2	3	4	5
1	(Switzerland) (Iran)	Heinz Günthardt; Moharram-Ali Khodai	6; 4	6; 2	1; 6	6; 4
2	(Switzerland) (Iran)	Serge Gramegna; Mansour Bahrami	6; 4	6; 3	4; 6	4; 6	2; 6
3	(Switzerland) (Iran)	Serge Gramegna / Heinz Günthardt; Mansour Bahrami / Kamyab Derafshijavan	6; 4	9; 7	6; 0
4	(Switzerland) (Iran)	Heinz Günthardt; Mansour Bahrami	6; 2	3; 6	6; 2	12; 14	11; 9
5	(Switzerland) (Iran)	Serge Gramegna; Moharram-Ali Khodai	2; 6	1; 6	4; 6

Belgium vs. Ireland

Belgium
5
Brussels, Belgium
15–17 September 1978

Ireland
0

			1	2	3	4	5
1	(Belgium) (Republic of Ireland)	Bernard Boileau; Sean Sorensen	6; 1	8; 6	6; 0
2	(Belgium) (Republic of Ireland)	Thierry Stevaux; Kevin Menton	6; 3	6; 1	6; 4
3	(Belgium) (Republic of Ireland)	Bernard Boileau / Thierry Stevaux; John Biscomb / Sean Sorensen	6; 0	6; 2	6; 3
4	(Belgium) (Republic of Ireland)	Bernard Boileau; Kevin Menton	6; 1	6; 1	6; 1
5	(Belgium) (Republic of Ireland)	Thierry Stevaux; Sean Sorensen	3; 6	7; 9	9; 7	6; 2	6; 4

==== Qualifying round ====
Netherlands vs. France

Netherlands
2
Amsterdam, Netherlands
16–18 March 1979
Carpet (indoors)

France
3

			1	2	3	4	5
1	(Netherlands) (France)	Tom Okker; Pascal Portes	3; 6	6; 4	6; 3	6; 1
2	(Netherlands) (France)	Louk Sanders; Yannick Noah	2; 6	4; 6	7; 5	3; 6
3	(Netherlands) (France)	Tom Okker / Rolf Thung; Patrice Dominguez / Gilles Moretton	9; 7	6; 8	6; 2	6; 1
4	(Netherlands) (France)	Tom Okker; Yannick Noah	10; 8	1; 6	9; 7	3; 6	4; 6
5	(Netherlands) (France)	Louk Sanders; Pascal Portes	6; 8	4; 6	4; 6

Switzerland vs. Yugoslavia

Switzerland
4
Zürich, Switzerland
16–18 March 1979

Yugoslavia
1

			1	2	3	4	5
1	(Switzerland) (Socialist Federal Republic of Yugoslavia)	Roland Stadler; Marko Ostoja	3; 6	6; 4	6; 2	6; 4
2	(Switzerland) (Socialist Federal Republic of Yugoslavia)	Heinz Günthardt; Zoltan Ilin	6; 4	6; 0	6; 2
3	(Switzerland) (Socialist Federal Republic of Yugoslavia)	Serge Gramegna / Heinz Günthardt; Zoltan Ilin / Marko Ostoja	10; 12	6; 3	7; 5	3; 6	5; 7
4	(Switzerland) (Socialist Federal Republic of Yugoslavia)	Roland Stadler; Zoltan Ilin	6; 1	6; 2	6; 4
5	(Switzerland) (Socialist Federal Republic of Yugoslavia)	Heinz Günthardt; Marko Ostoja	6; 1	6; 3	6; 4

West Germany vs. Israel

West Germany
3
Augsburg, West Germany
16–18 March 1979

Israel
2

			1	2	3	4	5
1	(West Germany) (Israel)	Rolf Gehring; Shlomo Glickstein	6; 4	2; 6	6; 2	7; 9	2; 6
2	(West Germany) (Israel)	Ulrich Pinner; Steve Krulevitz	6; 3	6; 3	7; 5
3	(West Germany) (Israel)	Ulrich Pinner / Werner Zirngibl; Shlomo Glickstein / Yair Wertheimer	3; 6	6; 3	6; 4	6; 4
4	(West Germany) (Israel)	Ulrich Pinner; Shlomo Glickstein	6; 2	6; 4	6; 2
5	(West Germany) (Israel)	Rolf Gehring; Steve Krulevitz	1; 6	6; 4	3; 6	9; 7	4; 6

Belgium vs. Romania

Belgium
1
Brussels, Belgium
16–18 March 1979

Romania
4

			1	2	3	4	5
1	(Belgium) (Romania)	Thierry Stevaux; Gavorielle Marcu	2; 6	5; 7	4; 6
2	(Belgium) (Romania)	Bernard Boileau; Ilie Năstase	3; 6	4; 6	2; 6
3	(Belgium) (Romania)	Bernard Boileau / Patrick Hombergen; Gavorielle Marcu / Ilie Năstase	7; 5	2; 6	4; 6	6; 4	2; 6
4	(Belgium) (Romania)	Thierry Stevaux; Ilie Năstase	0; 6	4; 6	4; 6
5	(Belgium) (Romania)	Bernard Boileau; Gavorielle Marcu	4; 6	6; 2	6; 3	6; 1

=== Main draw ===
==== Draw ====
Quarterfinals; 15–17 June
Czechoslovakia
bye
Paris, France (clay)
France	5
Switzerland	0
Bucharest, Romania (clay)
Romania	4
West Germany	1
bye
Sweden

Semifinals; 13–15 July
Paris, France (clay)
Czechoslovakia	4
France	1
Bucharest, Romania (clay)
Romania	2
Sweden	3

Final; 14–16 September
Prague, Czechoslovakia (clay)
Czechoslovakia	3
Sweden	2

==== Quarterfinals ====
France vs. Switzerland

France
5
Stade Roland Garros, Paris, France
15–17 June 1979
Clay

Switzerland
0

			1	2	3	4	5
1	(France) (Switzerland)	Yannick Noah; Heinz Günthardt	6; 0	6; 3	6; 2
2	(France) (Switzerland)	Dominique Bedel; Roland Stadler	2; 6	6; 2	7; 5	6; 4
3	(France) (Switzerland)	Gilles Moretton / Yannick Noah; Serge Gramegna / Heinz Günthardt	2; 6	6; 2	7; 5	6; 3
4	(France) (Switzerland)	Yannick Noah; Roland Stadler	6; 4	6; 0	6; 2
5	(France) (Switzerland)	Dominique Bedel; Heinz Günthardt	2; 6	6; 4	4; 6	14; 12	7; 5

Romania vs. West Germany

Romania
4
Bucharest, Romania
15–17 June 1979
Clay

West Germany
1

			1	2	3	4	5
1	(Romania) (West Germany)	Dumitru Hărădău; Max Wünschig	6; 2	3; 6	3; 6	4; 6
2	(Romania) (West Germany)	Ilie Năstase; Peter Elter	6; 4	6; 4	6; 2
3	(Romania) (West Germany)	Gavorielle Marcu / Ilie Năstase; Jürgen Fassbender / Ulrich Marten	6; 2	7; 5	7; 5
4	(Romania) (West Germany)	Dumitru Hărădău; Peter Elter	6; 3	6; 4	5; 7	6; 1
5	(Romania) (West Germany)	Ilie Năstase; Max Wünschig	6; 1	6; 3	7; 5

==== Semifinals ====
France vs. Czechoslovakia

France
1
Stade Roland Garros, Paris, France
13–15 July 1979
Clay

Czechoslovakia
4

			1	2	3	4	5
1	(France) (Czechoslovakia)	Yannick Noah; Ivan Lendl	3; 6	3; 6	6; 3	7; 9
2	(France) (Czechoslovakia)	Gilles Moretton; Tomáš Šmíd	6; 4	6; 4	3; 6	3; 6	6; 8
3	(France) (Czechoslovakia)	Gilles Moretton / Yannick Noah; Jan Kodeš / Tomáš Šmíd	5; 7	4; 6	7; 5	2; 6
4	(France) (Czechoslovakia)	Gilles Moretton; Ivan Lendl	1; 6	2; 6	2; 6
5	(France) (Czechoslovakia)	Yannick Noah; Tomáš Šmíd	7; 5	6; 1	6; 2

Romania vs. Sweden

Romania
2
Club Sportiv Progresul, Bucharest, Romania
13–15 July 1979
Clay

Sweden
3

			1	2	3	4	5
1	(Romania) (Sweden)	Ilie Năstase; Stefan Simonsson	7; 9	5; 7	7; 5	6; 3	6; 3
2	(Romania) (Sweden)	Dumitru Hărădău; Björn Borg	3; 6	0; 6	1; 6
3	(Romania) (Sweden)	Gavorielle Marcu / Ilie Năstase; Ove Bengtson / Björn Borg	5; 7	4; 6	3; 6
4	(Romania) (Sweden)	Ilie Năstase; Björn Borg	3; 6	0; 6	0; 6
5	(Romania) (Sweden)	Dumitru Hărădău; Stefan Simonsson	6; 3	6; 4	6; 3

==== Final ====
Czechoslovakia vs. Sweden

Czechoslovakia
3
Štvanice Stadium, Prague, Czechoslovakia
14–16 September 1979
Clay

Sweden
2

			1	2	3	4	5
1	(Czechoslovakia) (Sweden)	Tomáš Šmíd; Kjell Johansson	6; 4	6; 3	6; 2
2	(Czechoslovakia) (Sweden)	Ivan Lendl; Björn Borg	4; 6	5; 7	2; 6
3	(Czechoslovakia) (Sweden)	Jan Kodeš / Tomáš Šmíd; Ove Bengtson / Björn Borg	2; 6	6; 3	6; 4	6; 0
4	(Czechoslovakia) (Sweden)	Ivan Lendl; Kjell Johansson	8; 10	6; 4	6; 4	4; 6	6; 1
5	(Czechoslovakia) (Sweden)	Tomáš Šmíd; Per Hjertquist	3; 5					retired
