= 1980 Davis Cup Europe Zone =

Regional Zone of the Davis Cup

The Europe Zone was one of the three regional zones of the 1980 Davis Cup.

30 teams entered the Europe Zone, competing across 2 sub-zones. 26 teams entered the competition in the qualifying round, competing for 4 places in each sub-zone's main draw to join the 4 finalists from the 1979 Europe Zone. The winners of each sub-zone's main draw went on to compete in the Inter-Zonal Zone against the winners of the Americas Zone and Eastern Zone.

Italy defeated Sweden in the Zone A final, and Czechoslovakia defeated Romania in the Zone B final, resulting in both Italy and Czechoslovakia progressing to the Inter-Zonal Zone.

== Zone A ==
=== Pre-qualifying round ===
==== Draw ====
Pre-qualifying round
Mondorf-les-Bains, Luxembourg
Luxembourg	1
Turkey	4

==== Results ====
Luxembourg vs. Turkey

Luxembourg
1
Mondorf-les-Bains, Luxembourg
August 1979

Turkey
4

			1	2	3	4	5
1	(Luxembourg) (Turkey)	Marc Klensch; Bülent Altınkaya	1; 6	2; 6	6; 4	2; 6
2	(Luxembourg) (Turkey)	Jan Jilemnicky; Remzi Aydın	2; 6	2; 6	2; 6
3	(Luxembourg) (Turkey)	Pascal Genevo / Marc Klensch; Bülent Altınkaya / Kemal Anbar	0; 6	5; 7	2; 6
4	(Luxembourg) (Turkey)	Marc Klensch; Remzi Aydın	3; 6	2; 6	2; 6
5	(Luxembourg) (Turkey)	Jan Jilemnicky; Bülent Altınkaya	11; 9	6; 4	4; 6	6; 4

=== Preliminary rounds ===
==== Draw ====
First Round
Ramat HaSharon, Israel (hard)
Israel	4
Monaco	1
bye
Switzerland
Dublin, Ireland
Ireland	2
Bulgaria	3
bye
Hungary
Spain
bye
Hilversum, Netherlands (clay)
Netherlands	3
Denmark	2
West Germany
bye
Oslo, Norway (clay)
Norway	4
Turkey	1

Qualifying Round
Winterthur, Switzerland
Israel	1
Switzerland	4
Sofia, Bulgaria
Bulgaria	1
Hungary	3
Seville, Spain
Spain	4
Netherlands	1
Hanover, West Germany (clay)
West Germany	4
Norway	0

==== First round ====
Israel vs. Monaco

Israel
4
Ramat HaSharon, Israel
14–16 September 1979
Hard

Monaco
1

			1	2	3	4	5
1	(Israel) (Monaco)	Steve Krulevitz; Louis Borfiga	6; 2	6; 1	3; 6	6; 2
2	(Israel) (Monaco)	Shlomo Glickstein; Bernard Balleret	6; 3	6; 1	6; 4
3	(Israel) (Monaco)	Shlomo Glickstein / Yair Wertheimer; Bernard Balleret / Michel Borfiga	6; 2	6; 1	6; 0
4	(Israel) (Monaco)	Haim Arlozorov; Bernard Balleret	8; 6	4; 6	1; 6	4; 6
5	(Israel) (Monaco)	Shlomo Glickstein; Louis Borfiga	6; 3	6; 1	6; 0

Ireland vs. Bulgaria

Ireland
2
Dublin, Ireland
14–16 September 1979

Bulgaria
3

			1	2	3	4	5
1	(Republic of Ireland) (Bulgaria)	Sean Sorensen; Ljuben Genov	6; 4	3; 6	6; 4	6; 3
2	(Republic of Ireland) (Bulgaria)	Kevin Menton; Lyubomir Petrov	2; 6	2; 6	2; 6
3	(Republic of Ireland) (Bulgaria)	James McArdle / Sean Sorensen; Bozhidar Pampoulov / Matei Pampoulov	5; 7	6; 3	3; 6	4; 6
4	(Republic of Ireland) (Bulgaria)	Kevin Menton; Ljuben Genov	0; 6	4; 6	0; 6
5	(Republic of Ireland) (Bulgaria)	Sean Sorensen; Lyubomir Petrov	6; 4	6; 4	4; 6	6; 1

Netherlands vs. Denmark

Netherlands
3
Hilversum, Netherlands
14–16 September 1979
Clay

Denmark
2

			1	2	3	4	5
1	(Netherlands) (Denmark)	Louk Sanders; Michael Mortensen	6; 3	6; 3	6; 3
2	(Netherlands) (Denmark)	Rolf Thung; Lars Elvstrøm	1; 6	4; 6	1; 6
3	(Netherlands) (Denmark)	Theo Gorter / Paul van Min; Lars Elvstrøm / Michael Mortensen	4; 6	6; 2	4; 6	4; 6
4	(Netherlands) (Denmark)	Rolf Thung; Michael Mortensen	7; 5	3; 6	7; 5	9; 7
5	(Netherlands) (Denmark)	Louk Sanders; Lars Elvstrøm	7; 5	6; 4	3; 6	6; 0

Norway vs. Turkey

Norway
4
Oslo, Norway
14–16 September 1979
Clay

Turkey
1

			1	2	3	4	5
1	(Norway) (Turkey)	Thomas Randby; Remzi Aydın	6; 4	0; 6	3; 6	4; 6
2	(Norway) (Turkey)	Per Hegna; Arif Koçak	6; 1	6; 1	6; 0
3	(Norway) (Turkey)	Per Hegna / Jan Munch-Søegaard; Remzi Aydın / Arif Koçak	6; 4	6; 3	6; 2
4	(Norway) (Turkey)	Per Hegna; Remzi Aydın	6; 1	6; 3	6; 1
5	(Norway) (Turkey)	Thomas Randby; Arif Koçak	6; 1	1; 6	6; 1	6; 2

==== Qualifying round ====
Switzerland vs. Israel

Switzerland
4
Winterthur, Switzerland
8–10 February 1980

Israel
1

			1	2	3	4	5
1	(Switzerland) (Israel)	Roland Stadler; Shlomo Glickstein	6; 2	6; 4	3; 6	3; 6	0; 6
2	(Switzerland) (Israel)	Heinz Günthardt; Steve Krulevitz	6; 1	6; 3	3; 6	6; 3
3	(Switzerland) (Israel)	Heinz Günthardt / Markus Günthardt; Shlomo Glickstein / Steve Krulevitz	6; 4	6; 3	7; 5
4	(Switzerland) (Israel)	Roland Stadler; Steve Krulevitz	5; 7	6; 2	6; 2	8; 6
5	(Switzerland) (Israel)	Heinz Günthardt; Shlomo Glickstein	6; 3	6; 3	6; 1

Bulgaria vs. Hungary

Bulgaria
1
Sofia, Bulgaria
8–10 February 1980

Hungary
3

			1	2	3	4	5
1	(Bulgaria) (Hungary)	Julian Stamatov; János Benyik	1; 6	1; 6	5; 7
2	(Bulgaria) (Hungary)	Matei Pampoulov; Balázs Taróczy	1; 6	1; 6	3; 6
3	(Bulgaria) (Hungary)	Matei Pampoulov / Lyubomir Petrov; Péter Szőke / Balázs Taróczy	3; 6	4; 6	6; 3	6; 8
4	(Bulgaria) (Hungary)	Lyubomir Petrov; János Benyik	3; 6	5; 7	6; 3	7; 5	6; 3
5	(Bulgaria) (Hungary)	Julian Stamatov; Balázs Taróczy						not played

Spain vs. Netherlands

Spain
4
Real Club Pineda, Seville, Spain
8–10 February 1980

Netherlands
1

			1	2	3	4	5
1	(Spain) (Netherlands)	Fernando Luna; Tom Okker	6; 2	6; 2	6; 3
2	(Spain) (Netherlands)	José Higueras; Louk Sanders	6; 2	6; 4	6; 3
3	(Spain) (Netherlands)	Ángel Giménez / Manuel Orantes; Huub van Boeckel / Tom Okker	6; 8	6; 2	3; 6	11; 9	6; 8
4	(Spain) (Netherlands)	Ángel Giménez; Tom Okker	6; 1	6; 1
5	(Spain) (Netherlands)	Fernando Luna; Louk Sanders	6; 4	6; 1	6; 4

West Germany vs. Norway

West Germany
4
Hanover, West Germany
8–10 February 1980
Clay

Norway
0

			1	2	3	4	5
1	(West Germany) (Norway)	Rolf Gehring; Jan Munch-Søegaard	6; 1	6; 1	6; 1
2	(West Germany) (Norway)	Karl Meiler; Per Hegna	6; 1	6; 3	6; 1
3	(West Germany) (Norway)	Andreas Maurer / Karl Meiler; Ragnar Felix / Jan Munch-Søegaard	7; 5	6; 2	6; 1
4	(West Germany) (Norway)	Andreas Maurer; Per Hegna	6; 1	6; 0	6; 1
5	(West Germany) (Norway)	Rolf Gehring; Jan Munch-Søegaard						not played

=== Main draw ===
==== Draw ====
Quarterfinals; 7–9 March
Italy
bye
Zürich, Switzerland
Switzerland	3
Hungary	2
Valencia, Spain
Spain	2
West Germany	3
bye
Sweden

Semifinals; 10–15 June
Turin, Italy (clay)
Italy	5
Switzerland	0
Båstad, Sweden (clay)
West Germany	1
Sweden	4

Final; 11–13 July
Rome, Italy (clay)
Italy	4
Sweden	1

==== Quarterfinals ====
Switzerland vs. Hungary

Switzerland
3
Zürich, Switzerland
7–9 March 1980

Hungary
2

			1	2	3	4	5
1	(Switzerland) (Hungary)	Heinz Günthardt; János Benyik	3; 6	7; 5	6; 4	4; 6	6; 1
2	(Switzerland) (Hungary)	Roland Stadler; Zoltán Kuhárszky	6; 3	4; 6	3; 6	8; 6	4; 6
3	(Switzerland) (Hungary)	Heinz Günthardt / Roland Stadler; Róbert Machán / Péter Szőke	4; 6	6; 3	8; 6	15; 13
4	(Switzerland) (Hungary)	Roland Stadler; János Benyik	5; 7	5; 7	5; 7
5	(Switzerland) (Hungary)	Heinz Günthardt; Zoltán Kuhárszky	6; 1	6; 2	6; 4

Spain vs. West Germany

Spain
2
Club de Tenis Valencia, Valencia, Spain
7–9 March 1980

West Germany
3

			1	2	3	4	5
1	(Spain) (West Germany)	Fernando Luna; Ulrich Pinner	6; 0	6; 4	6; 3
2	(Spain) (West Germany)	José Higueras; Rolf Gehring	6; 3	6; 1	1; 6	2; 6	1; 6
3	(Spain) (West Germany)	Ángel Giménez / José Higueras; Rolf Gehring / Karl Meiler	7; 5	6; 4	11; 9
4	(Spain) (West Germany)	José Higueras; Ulrich Pinner	4; 6	3; 6	3; 6
5	(Spain) (West Germany)	Fernando Luna; Rolf Gehring	6; 3	3; 6	3; 6	3; 6

==== Semifinals ====
Italy vs. Switzerland

Italy
5
Turin, Italy
13–15 June 1980
Clay

Switzerland
0

			1	2	3	4	5
1	(Italy) (Switzerland)	Corrado Barazzutti; Heinz Günthardt	6; 4	6; 1	6; 4
2	(Italy) (Switzerland)	Adriano Panatta; Roland Stadler	6; 4	10; 8	6; 1
3	(Italy) (Switzerland)	Paolo Bertolucci / Adriano Panatta; Heinz Günthardt / Markus Günthardt	7; 9	10; 8	1; 6	6; 4	6; 2
4	(Italy) (Switzerland)	Corrado Barazzutti; Roland Stadler	6; 3	6; 4
5	(Italy) (Switzerland)	Gianni Ocleppo; Ivan Dupasquier	6; 0	6; 3

Sweden vs. West Germany

Sweden
4
Båstad Tennis Stadium, Båstad, Sweden
10–13 June 1980
Clay

West Germany
1

			1	2	3	4	5
1	(Sweden) (West Germany)	Björn Borg; Rolf Gehring	6; 1	6; 1	6; 2
2	(Sweden) (West Germany)	Kjell Johansson; Klaus Eberhard	6; 4	0; 6	6; 2	6; 3
3	(Sweden) (West Germany)	Per Hjertquist / Stefan Simonsson; Rolf Gehring / Reinhart Probst	5; 7	3; 6	2; 6
4	(Sweden) (West Germany)	Björn Borg; Klaus Eberhard	6; 2	5; 7	6; 0	6; 0
5	(Sweden) (West Germany)	Stefan Simonsson; Rolf Gehring	3; 6	6; 1	6; 0

==== Final ====
Italy vs. Sweden

Italy
4
Foro Italico, Rome, Italy
11–13 July 1980
Clay

Sweden
1

			1	2	3	4	5
1	(Italy) (Sweden)	Corrado Barazzutti; Kjell Johansson	6; 3	6; 3	6; 2
2	(Italy) (Sweden)	Adriano Panatta; Stefan Simonsson	6; 8	6; 1	2; 6	6; 4	4; 6
3	(Italy) (Sweden)	Paolo Bertolucci / Adriano Panatta; Hans Simonsson / Stefan Simonsson	6; 2	6; 3	7; 5
4	(Italy) (Sweden)	Adriano Panatta; Kjell Johansson	3; 6	6; 3	6; 4	1; 6	6; 4
5	(Italy) (Sweden)	Corrado Barazzutti; Stefan Simonsson	8; 6	6; 1

== Zone B ==
=== Pre-qualifying round ===
==== Draw ====
Pre-qualifying round
Paris, France (clay)
Algeria	1
Morocco	4

==== Results ====
Algeria vs. Morocco

Algeria
1
Stade Roland Garros, Paris, France
14–16 September 1979
Clay

Morocco
4

			1	2	3	4	5
1	(Algeria) (Morocco)	Djamel Boudjemline; Mustapha Dislam	6; 2	9; 7	6; 4
2	(Algeria) (Morocco)	Yassine Amier; Omar Laimina	2; 6	5; 7	1; 6
3	(Algeria) (Morocco)	Yassine Amier / Djamel Boudjemline; Omar Laimina / Houcine Saber	2; 6	4; 6	3; 6
4	(Algeria) (Morocco)	Yassine Amier; Mustapha Dislam	4; 6	5; 7	6; 8
5	(Algeria) (Morocco)	Djamel Boudjemline; Omar Laimina	3; 6	0; 6	1; 6

=== Preliminary rounds ===
==== Draw ====
First Round
Casablanca, Morocco
Morocco	1
Belgium	4
bye
Austria
Belgrade, Yugoslavia (clay)
Yugoslavia	5
Portugal	0
bye
Romania
France
bye
Athens, Greece
Soviet Union	5
Greece	0
Poland
bye
Helsinki, Finland
Finland	5
Egypt	0

Qualifying Round
Brussels, Belgium
Belgium	2
Austria	3
Zagreb, Yugoslavia (indoor hard)
Yugoslavia	0
Romania	5
Montpellier, France (indoor carpet)
France	3
Soviet Union	2
Helsinki, Finland
Poland	0
Finland	5

==== First round ====
Morocco vs. Belgium

Morocco
1
Casablanca, Morocco
27–29 October 1979

Belgium
4

			1	2	3	4	5
1	(Morocco) (Belgium)	Houcine Saber; Bernard Boileau	3; 6	1; 6	3; 6
2	(Morocco) (Belgium)	Omar Laimina; Thierry Stevaux	7; 9	6; 3	6; 1	0; 6	8; 6
3	(Morocco) (Belgium)	Omar Laimina / Houcine Saber; Bernard Boileau / Thierry Stevaux	3; 6	0; 6	8; 10
4	(Morocco) (Belgium)	Houcine Saber; Thierry Stevaux	3; 6	2; 6	1; 6
5	(Morocco) (Belgium)	Omar Laimina; Bernard Boileau	3; 6	2; 6	1; 6

Yugoslavia vs. Portugal

Yugoslavia
5
Belgrade, Yugoslavia
14–16 September 1979
Clay

Portugal
0

			1	2	3	4	5
1	(Socialist Federal Republic of Yugoslavia) (Portugal)	Zoltan Ilin; José Vilela	6; 2	6; 1	6; 0
2	(Socialist Federal Republic of Yugoslavia) (Portugal)	Željko Franulović; José Manuel Cordeiro	6; 1	6; 0	6; 0
3	(Socialist Federal Republic of Yugoslavia) (Portugal)	Željko Franulović / Marko Ostoja; José Manuel Cordeiro / Pedro Cordeiro	6; 0	6; 1	6; 2
4	(Socialist Federal Republic of Yugoslavia) (Portugal)	Zoltan Ilin; José Manuel Cordeiro	6; 0	6; 1	6; 2
5	(Socialist Federal Republic of Yugoslavia) (Portugal)	Marko Ostoja; José Vilela	2; 6	7; 5	6; 4

Greece vs. Soviet Union

Greece
0
Athens, Greece
14–16 September 1979

Soviet Union
5

			1	2	3	4	5
1	(Greece) (Soviet Union)	Nicholas Kalogeropoulos; Alexander Zverev	0; 6	3; 6	3; 6
2	(Greece) (Soviet Union)	George Kalovelonis; Alex Metreveli	1; 6	4; 6	4; 6
3	(Greece) (Soviet Union)	Nicholas Kalogeropoulos / George Kalovelonis; Alex Metreveli / Alexander Zverev	4; 6	2; 6	4; 6
4	(Greece) (Soviet Union)	George Kalovelonis; Alexander Zverev	1; 6	4; 6	4; 6
5	(Greece) (Soviet Union)	Nicholas Kalogeropoulos; Alex Metreveli	3; 6	7; 5	4; 6	5; 7

Finland vs. Egypt

Finland
5
Helsinki, Finland
14–16 September 1979

Egypt
0

			1	2	3	4	5
1	(Finland) (Egypt)	Matti Timonen; Tarek-Shawki El Sakka	6; 1	6; 3	6; 3
2	(Finland) (Egypt)	Leo Palin; Ahmed El-Mehelmy	6; 0	6; 2	6; 3
3	(Finland) (Egypt)	Leo Palin / Matti Timonen; Ahmed El-Mehelmy / Tarek-Shawki El Sakka	6; 0	6; 2	6; 1
4	(Finland) (Egypt)	Matti Timonen; Ahmed El-Mehelmy	6; 2	6; 1	6; 0
5	(Finland) (Egypt)	Leo Palin; Tarek-Shawki El Sakka	6; 4	6; 1	6; 0

==== Qualifying round ====
Belgium vs. Austria

Belgium
2
Brussels, Belgium
8–10 February 1980

Austria
3

			1	2	3	4	5
1	(Belgium) (Austria)	Patrick Hombergen; Hans Kary	6; 4	6; 8	2; 6	4; 6
2	(Belgium) (Austria)	Bernard Boileau; Peter Feigl	6; 4	3; 6	7; 5	6; 3
3	(Belgium) (Austria)	Bernard Boileau / Patrick Hombergen; Peter Feigl / Hans Kary	3; 6	6; 3	13; 15	13; 15
4	(Belgium) (Austria)	Bernard Boileau; Hans Kary	2; 6	4; 6	6; 3	7; 5	6; 2
5	(Belgium) (Austria)	Patrick Hombergen; Peter Feigl	5; 7	3; 6	4; 6

Yugoslavia vs. Romania

Yugoslavia
0
Zagreb, Yugoslavia
4–6 February 1980
Hard (indoors)

Romania
5

			1	2	3	4	5
1	(Socialist Federal Republic of Yugoslavia) (Romania)	Zoltan Ilin; Ilie Năstase	10; 12	3; 6	6; 4	3; 6
2	(Socialist Federal Republic of Yugoslavia) (Romania)	Željko Franulović; Florin Segărceanu	4; 6	5; 7	5; 7
3	(Socialist Federal Republic of Yugoslavia) (Romania)	Željko Franulović / Zoltan Ilin; Ilie Năstase / Florin Segărceanu	4; 6	10; 12	6; 3	5; 7
4	(Socialist Federal Republic of Yugoslavia) (Romania)	Zoltan Ilin; Florin Segărceanu	6; 2	4; 6	3; 6	2; 6
5	(Socialist Federal Republic of Yugoslavia) (Romania)	Zoran Petković; Ilie Năstase	2; 6	1; 6	2; 6

France vs. Soviet Union

France
3
Palais des Sports, Montpellier, France
8–10 February 1980
Carpet (indoors)

Soviet Union
2

			1	2	3	4	5
1	(France) (Soviet Union)	Yannick Noah; Vadim Borisov	6; 3	15; 13	4; 6	3; 6	3; 6
2	(France) (Soviet Union)	Pascal Portes; Sergey Leonyuk	6; 3	6; 4	6; 3
3	(France) (Soviet Union)	Yannick Noah / Pascal Portes; Vadim Borisov / Teimuraz Kakulia	6; 4	6; 4	6; 4
4	(France) (Soviet Union)	Yannick Noah; Sergey Leonyuk	6; 1	6; 0	6; 2
5	(France) (Soviet Union)	Pascal Portes; Vadim Borisov	7; 5	2; 6	2; 6	3; 6

Finland vs. Poland

Finland
5
Helsinki, Finland
8–10 February 1980

Poland
0

			1	2	3	4	5
1	(Finland) (Poland)	Leo Palin; Tadeusz Nowicki	6; 3	6; 3	7; 5
2	(Finland) (Poland)	Matti Timonen; Henryk Drzymalski	6; 3	6; 1	6; 1
3	(Finland) (Poland)	Leo Palin / Matti Timonen; Henryk Drzymalski / Tadeusz Nowicki	7; 5	8; 10	3; 6	6; 4	6; 4
4	(Finland) (Poland)	Matti Timonen; Tadeusz Nowicki	6; 3	6; 3	3; 6	6; 3
5	(Finland) (Poland)	Joakim Berner; Andrzej Wisnieski	6; 1	6; 1

=== Main draw ===
==== Draw ====
Quarterfinals; 7–9 March
Great Britain
bye
Bucharest, Romania (indoor hard)
Austria	2
Romania	3
Toulouse, France (indoor carpet)
France	3
Finland	2
bye
Czechoslovakia

Semifinals; 13–16 June
Bristol, United Kingdom (grass)
Great Britain	2
Romania	3
Prague, Czechoslovakia
France	0
Czechoslovakia	5

Final; 11–13 July
Bucharest, Romania (clay)
Romania	1
Czechoslovakia	4

==== Quarterfinals ====
Romania vs. Austria

Romania
3
Bucharest, Romania
7–9 March 1980
Hard (indoors)

Austria
2

			1	2	3	4	5
1	(Romania) (Austria)	Ilie Năstase; Hans Kary	6; 1	7; 5	6; 4
2	(Romania) (Austria)	Florin Segărceanu; Robert Reininger	4; 6	7; 5	5; 7	1; 6
3	(Romania) (Austria)	Ilie Năstase / Florin Segărceanu; Hans Kary / Robert Reininger	8; 6	6; 4	6; 3
4	(Romania) (Austria)	Florin Segărceanu; Hans Kary	1; 6	6; 3	6; 2	13; 15	5; 7
5	(Romania) (Austria)	Ilie Năstase; Robert Reininger	6; 3	6; 3	6; 3

France vs. Finland

France
3
Exhibition Park, Toulouse, France
7–9 March 1980
Carpet (indoors)

Finland
2

			1	2	3	4	5
1	(France) (Finland)	Pascal Portes; Leo Palin	6; 2	1; 6	6; 2	6; 0
2	(France) (Finland)	Jean-Louis Haillet; Matti Timonen	6; 1	6; 1	6; 4
3	(France) (Finland)	Jean-Louis Haillet / Gilles Moretton; George Berner / Leo Palin	0; 6	6; 1	6; 4	6; 4
4	(France) (Finland)	Jean-Louis Haillet; Leo Palin	5; 7	2; 6	8; 6	6; 3	7; 9
5	(France) (Finland)	Pascal Portes; Matti Timonen	5; 7	6; 3	3; 6

==== Semifinals ====
Great Britain vs. Romania

Great Britain
2
Bristol Lawn Tennis Club, Bristol, United Kingdom
13–16 June 1980
Grass

Romania
3

			1	2	3	4	5
1	(United Kingdom) (Romania)	John Feaver; Andrei Dîrzu	6; 1	6; 4	3; 6	6; 8	4; 6
2	(United Kingdom) (Romania)	Buster Mottram; Ilie Năstase	3; 6	2; 6	4; 6
3	(United Kingdom) (Romania)	David Lloyd / John Lloyd; Andrei Dîrzu / Ilie Năstase	4; 6	7; 5	6; 4	6; 2
4	(United Kingdom) (Romania)	Buster Mottram; Andrei Dîrzu	7; 5	6; 2	6; 2
5	(United Kingdom) (Romania)	John Feaver; Ilie Năstase	5; 7	6; 8	6; 2	6; 2	4; 6

Czechoslovakia vs. France

Czechoslovakia
5
Doproavni Podniky Tennis Club, Prague, Czechoslovakia
13–15 June 1980

France
0

			1	2	3	4	5
1	(Czechoslovakia) (France)	Tomáš Šmíd; Christophe Roger-Vasselin	6; 2	6; 3	3; 6	6; 1
2	(Czechoslovakia) (France)	Ivan Lendl; Pascal Portes	6; 4	8; 6	6; 4
3	(Czechoslovakia) (France)	Pavel Složil / Tomáš Šmíd; Dominique Bedel / Pascal Portes	6; 3	7; 5	6; 3
4	(Czechoslovakia) (France)	Ivan Lendl; Christophe Roger-Vasselin	4; 6	7; 5	6; 4
5	(Czechoslovakia) (France)	Tomáš Šmíd; Pascal Portes	6; 4	3; 6	6; 2

==== Final ====
Romania vs. Czechoslovakia

Romania
1
Bucharest, Romania
11–13 July 1980
Clay

Czechoslovakia
4

			1	2	3	4	5
1	(Romania) (Czechoslovakia)	Dumitru Hărădău; Ivan Lendl	4; 6	1; 6	3; 6
2	(Romania) (Czechoslovakia)	Florin Segărceanu; Pavel Složil	3; 6	3; 6	1; 6
3	(Romania) (Czechoslovakia)	Dumitru Hărădău / Florin Segărceanu; Jan Kodeš / Ivan Lendl	3; 6	2; 6	4; 6
4	(Romania) (Czechoslovakia)	Eduard Pană; Pavel Složil	5; 7	0; 6
5	(Romania) (Czechoslovakia)	Florin Segărceanu; Stanislav Birner	2; 6	6; 2	8; 6
