= 1978 Davis Cup Americas Zone =

International tennis competition

The Americas Zone was one of the three regional zones of the 1978 Davis Cup.

10 teams entered the Americas Zone in total, with 3 teams entering the North & Central America Zone and 8 teams entering the South America Zone. The winner of each sub-zone advanced to the Americas Inter-Zonal Final, with the winner going on to compete in the Inter-Zonal Zone against the winners of the Eastern Zone and Europe Zone.

The United States defeated South Africa in the North & Central America Zone final, and Chile defeated Argentina in the South America Zone final. In the Americas Inter-Zonal Final the United States defeated Chile and progressed to the Inter-Zonal Zone.

The North & Central America Zone was marked by a number of incidents related to the continued presence of South Africa team. Canada, Mexico, Venezuela, and the Caribbean/West Indies teams all withdrew from the competition, and large scale protests accompanied the final between the United States and South Africa at Vanderbilt University in Nashville, Tennessee. In an effort to appease its critics, South Africa named Peter Lamb as one of the six members of its team, as its first-ever "coloured" player. However, Lamb did not play, and his inclusion in the squad was derided as tokenism. Crowds of up to 5000 turned out in protest.

== North & Central America Zone ==
=== Draw ===
Semifinals; 15–17 December 1977
United States
bye
Johannesburg, South Africa
South Africa	4
Colombia	1

Final; 17–19 March
Nashville, TN, United States (indoor carpet)
United States	4
South Africa	1

=== Semifinals ===
South Africa vs. Colombia

South Africa
4
Johannesburg, South Africa
15–17 December 1977

Colombia
1

			1	2	3	4	5
1	(South Africa) (Colombia)	Byron Bertram; Jairo Velasco	0; 6	3; 6	6; 4	12; 10	6; 1
2	(South Africa) (Colombia)	Ray Moore; Iván Molina	5; 7	2; 6	6; 4	2; 6
3	(South Africa) (Colombia)	Bob Hewitt / Frew McMillan; Álvaro Betancur / Iván Molina	6; 0	8; 6	6; 2
4	(South Africa) (Colombia)	Byron Bertram; Iván Molina	3; 6	6; 3	6; 4	6; 4
5	(South Africa) (Colombia)	Ray Moore; Álvaro Betancur	6; 3	6; 3	6; 2

=== Final ===
United States vs. South Africa

United States
4
Vanderbilt University, Nashville, TN, United States
17–19 March 1978
Carpet (indoors)

South Africa
1

			1	2	3	4	5
1	(United States) (South Africa)	Vitas Gerulaitis; Bernard Mitton	2; 6	6; 2	6; 1	7; 5
2	(United States) (South Africa)	Harold Solomon; Byron Bertram	4; 6	6; 0	6; 3	6; 1
3	(United States) (South Africa)	Fred McNair / Sherwood Stewart; Bob Hewitt / Frew McMillan	0; 6	3; 6	4; 6
4	(United States) (South Africa)	Harold Solomon; Bernard Mitton	7; 5	6; 4	6; 2
5	(United States) (South Africa)	Vitas Gerulaitis; Byron Bertram	6; 3	6; 3	6; 0

== South America Zone ==
=== Preliminary rounds ===
==== Draw ====
First Round; 1–6 November 1977
Chile
bye
Lima, Peru
Peru	0
Bolivia	5
Montevideo, Uruguay (clay)
Uruguay	3
Ecuador	2
bye
Brazil

Qualifying Round; 9–11 December 1977
Santiago, Chile
Chile	5
Bolivia	0
Montevideo, Uruguay
Uruguay	4
Brazil	1

==== First round ====
Peru vs. Bolivia

Peru
0
Lima, Peru
4–6 November 1977

Bolivia
5

			1	2	3	4	5
1	(Peru) (Bolivia)	Fernando Maynetto; Mario Martínez	3; 6	3; 6	6; 4	5; 7
2	(Peru) (Bolivia)	Miguel Maurtúa; Ramiro Benavides	2; 6	4; 6	6; 4	5; 7
3	(Peru) (Bolivia)	Miguel Maurtúa / Fernando Maynetto; Juan Carlos Alvarado / Ramiro Benavides	6; 3	6; 8	2; 6	7; 5	3; 6
4	(Peru) (Bolivia)	Miguel Maurtúa; Mario Martínez	4; 6	6; 4	4; 6	8; 10
5	(Peru) (Bolivia)	Luis Alberto Olmedo; Juan Carlos Alvarado	0; 6	1; 6	3; 6

Uruguay vs. Ecuador

Uruguay
3
Montevideo, Uruguay
November 1977
Clay

Ecuador
2

			1	2	3	4	5
1	(Uruguay) (Ecuador)	Hugo Roverano; Ricardo Pazmiño	6; 2	6; 2	6; 1
2	(Uruguay) (Ecuador)	José Luis Damiani; Ricardo Ycaza	4; 6	5; 7	1; 6
3	(Uruguay) (Ecuador)	José Luis Damiani / Hugo Roverano; Miguel Olvera / Ricardo Ycaza	6; 3	6; 2	6; 2
4	(Uruguay) (Ecuador)	José Luis Damiani; Ricardo Pazmiño	6; 1	6; 0	6; 2
5	(Uruguay) (Ecuador)	Hugo Roverano; Ricardo Ycaza	5; 7	2; 6	4; 6

==== Qualifying round ====
Chile vs. Bolivia

Chile
5
Santiago, Chile
9–11 December 1977

Bolivia
0

			1	2	3	4	5
1	(Chile) (Bolivia)	Belus Prajoux; Mario Martínez	6; 4	6; 1	6; 3
2	(Chile) (Bolivia)	Hans Gildemeister; Ramiro Benavides	6; 2	6; 2	6; 1
3	(Chile) (Bolivia)	Patricio Cornejo / Jaime Fillol; Juan Carlos Alvarado / Ramiro Benavides	3; 6	6; 2	6; 0	8; 6
4	(Chile) (Bolivia)	Hans Gildemeister; Mario Martínez	6; 3	6; 1	6; 3
5	(Chile) (Bolivia)	Belus Prajoux; Ramiro Benavides	6; 1	6; 1	6; 1

Uruguay vs. Brazil

Uruguay
4
Montevideo, Uruguay
9–11 December 1977

Brazil
1

			1	2	3	4	5
1	(Uruguay) (Brazil)	José Luis Damiani; Thomaz Koch	7; 5	6; 4	6; 0
2	(Uruguay) (Brazil)	Hugo Roverano; Carlos Kirmayr	0; 6	6; 2	6; 3	4; 6	7; 5
3	(Uruguay) (Brazil)	José Luis Damiani / Hugo Roverano; Carlos Kirmayr / Thomaz Koch	9; 7	6; 3	6; 2
4	(Uruguay) (Brazil)	José Luis Damiani; Marcos Hocevar	6; 3	6; 4	6; 4
5	(Uruguay) (Brazil)	Hugo Roverano; Fernando Gentil	1; 6	3; 6	7; 5	5; 7

=== Main draw ===
==== Draw ====
Semifinals; 18–20 December 1977
Santiago, Chile
Chile	5
Uruguay	0
bye
Argentina

Final; 17–19 March
Santiago, Chile (clay)
Chile	3
Argentina	2

=== Semifinals ===
Chile vs. Uruguay

Chile
5
Santiago, Chile
18–20 December 1977

Uruguay
0

			1	2	3	4	5
1	(Chile) (Uruguay)	Jaime Fillol; Hugo Roverano	9; 7	6; 3	6; 0
2	(Chile) (Uruguay)	Hans Gildemeister; José Luis Damiani	6; 2	6; 2	6; 2
3	(Chile) (Uruguay)	Patricio Cornejo / Belus Prajoux; José Luis Damiani / Hugo Roverano	6; 4	6; 4	6; 2
4	(Chile) (Uruguay)	Jaime Fillol; José Luis Damiani	8; 6	6; 0	6; 2
5	(Chile) (Uruguay)	Hans Gildemeister; Hugo Roverano	6; 1	6; 4	6; 2

=== Final ===
Chile vs. Argentina

Chile
3
Santiago, Chile
17–19 March 1978
Clay

Argentina
2

			1	2	3	4	5
1	(Chile) (Argentina)	Hans Gildemeister; Guillermo Vilas	9; 7	6; 3	3; 6	6; 4
2	(Chile) (Argentina)	Jaime Fillol; Ricardo Cano	6; 2	6; 3	6; 3
3	(Chile) (Argentina)	Patricio Cornejo / Jaime Fillol; José Luis Clerc / Guillermo Vilas	4; 6	3; 6	3; 6
4	(Chile) (Argentina)	Hans Gildemeister; Ricardo Cano	6; 4	7; 5	6; 4
5	(Chile) (Argentina)	Jaime Fillol; Guillermo Vilas	3; 6	4; 6	0; 6

== Americas Inter-Zonal Final ==
Chile vs. United States

Chile
2
Estadio Nacional, Santiago, Chile
15–17 September 1978
Clay

United States
3

			1	2	3	4	5
1	(Chile) (United States)	Jaime Fillol; Brian Gottfried	4; 6	5; 7	2; 6
2	(Chile) (United States)	Hans Gildemeister; Harold Solomon	5; 7	6; 3	3; 6	1; 6
3	(Chile) (United States)	Jaime Fillol / Belus Prajoux; Brian Gottfried / John McEnroe	6; 3	3; 6	6; 8	3; 6
4	(Chile) (United States)	Jaime Fillol; Harold Solomon	6; 3	6; 2
5	(Chile) (United States)	Hans Gildemeister; Brian Gottfried	4; 6	7; 5	12; 10
