= 1978 Davis Cup =

1978 edition of the Davis Cup

Details
- Duration: 27 August 1977 – 10 December 1978
- Edition: 67th
- Teams: 50

Champion
- Winning nation: United States

The 1978 Davis Cup was the 67th edition of the Davis Cup, the most important tournament between national teams in men's tennis. 50 teams entered the competition, 29 in the Europe Zone, 10 in the Americas Zone, and 11 in the Eastern Zone.

The United States defeated Chile in the Americas Inter-Zonal final, Australia defeated New Zealand in the Eastern Zone final, and Great Britain and Sweden were the winners of the two Europe Zones, defeating Czechoslovakia and Hungary respectively.

In the Inter-Zonal Zone, the United States defeated Sweden and Great Britain defeated Australia in the semifinals. The United States then defeated Great Britain in the final to win their 25th title overall and their first since 1972. The final was held at the Mission Hills Country Club in Rancho Mirage, California, United States on 8–10 December.

== Political controversy ==
The competition was significantly marked by political issues: Canada, Mexico, Venezuela, and the Caribbean/West Indies all withdrew from the North & Central America Zone due to the continued presence of South Africa in the competition, despite continued international condemnation of their government's apartheid policies.

The North & Central America Zone final between the United States and South Africa, held at Vanderbilt University, Nashville, Tennessee, attracted crowds of up to 5,000 protesters each day, and efforts by the South African side to appease critics by nominating Peter Lamb as its first "coloured" player were derided by some as tokenism, given he did not actually play during the tie and was a student enrolled at Vanderbilt University at the time of the tournament.

The Soviet Union continued to be barred for competing following its refusal to compete against Chile in the 1976 semifinals and its promised refusal to compete against South Africa.

== Americas Zone ==
=== North & Central America Zone ===
Semifinals
United States
bye
Johannesburg, South Africa
South Africa	4
Colombia	1

Final
Nashville, TN, United States (indoor carpet)
United States	4
South Africa	1

=== South America Zone ===
==== Preliminary rounds ====
First Round
Chile
bye
Lima, Peru
Peru	0
Bolivia	5
Montevideo, Uruguay (clay)
Uruguay	3
Ecuador	2
bye
Brazil

Qualifying Round
Santiago, Chile
Chile	5
Bolivia	0
Montevideo, Uruguay
Uruguay	4
Brazil	1

==== Main Draw ====
Semifinals; 18–20 December 1977
Santiago, Chile
Chile	5
Uruguay	0
bye
Argentina

Final; 17–19 March
Santiago, Chile (clay)
Chile	3
Argentina	2

=== Americas Inter-Zonal Final ===
Chile vs. United States

Chile
2
Estadio Nacional, Santiago, Chile
15–17 September 1978
Clay

United States
3

			1	2	3	4	5
1	(Chile) (United States)	Jaime Fillol; Brian Gottfried	4; 6	5; 7	2; 6
2	(Chile) (United States)	Hans Gildemeister; Harold Solomon	5; 7	6; 3	3; 6	1; 6
3	(Chile) (United States)	Jaime Fillol / Belus Prajoux; Brian Gottfried / John McEnroe	6; 3	3; 6	6; 8	3; 6
4	(Chile) (United States)	Jaime Fillol; Harold Solomon	6; 3	6; 2
5	(Chile) (United States)	Hans Gildemeister; Brian Gottfried	4; 6	7; 5	12; 10

== Eastern Zone ==
=== Preliminary rounds ===
First Round
Manila, Philippines
Philippines	5
Thailand	0
Tokyo, Japan
Japan	5
Chinese Taipei	0
Rawalpindi, Pakistan
Pakistan	4
Malaysia	0
bye
South Korea

Qualifying Round
Manila, Philippines
Philippines	1
Japan	4
Seoul, South Korea
Pakistan	2
South Korea	3

=== Main Draw ===
Quarterfinals; 9–12 December 1977
Australia
bye
Tokyo, Japan
Indonesia	1
Japan	4
Coimbatore, India
South Korea	1
India	4
bye
New Zealand

Semifinals; 19–22 January
Tokyo, Japan (clay)
Australia	5
Japan	0
New Delhi, India
India	1
New Zealand	4

Final; 24–26 February
Adelaide, Australia (grass)
Australia	4
New Zealand	0

==== Final ====
Australia vs. New Zealand

Australia
4
Memorial Drive, Adelaide, Australia
24–26 February 1978
Grass

New Zealand
0

			1	2	3	4	5
1	(Australia) (New Zealand)	Tony Roche; Chris Lewis	13; 11	6; 3	6; 2
2	(Australia) (New Zealand)	John Alexander; Brian Fairlie	6; 4	6; 4	6; 4
3	(Australia) (New Zealand)	John Alexander / Tony Roche; Brian Fairlie / Chris Lewis	6; 3	6; 4	12; 14	4; 6	6; 1
4	(Australia) (New Zealand)	John Alexander; Chris Lewis	8; 10	16; 14	6; 1	9; 7
5	(Australia) (New Zealand)	Allan Stone; Brian Fairlie	2; 6	6; 1				not completed

== Europe Zone ==
=== Zone A ===
==== Preliminary rounds ====
First Round
Monte Carlo, Monaco
Monaco	5
Luxembourg	0
bye
Great Britain
Tel Aviv, Israel (hard)
Israel	5
Finland	0
bye
Austria
Czechoslovakia
bye
Zeist, Netherlands (clay)
Netherlands	4
Greece	1
Poland
bye
Algiers, Algeria (clay)
Algeria	1
Iran	4

Qualifying Round
Monte Carlo, Monaco (clay)
Monaco	0
Great Britain	5
Tel Aviv, Israel (hard)
Israel	2
Austria	3
Prague, Czechoslovakia (indoor clay)
Czechoslovakia	3
Netherlands	1
Warsaw, Poland
Poland	4
Iran	1

==== Main Draw ====
Quarterfinals; 16–18 June
France
bye
Bristol, United Kingdom (grass)
Great Britain	5
Austria	0
Prague, Czechoslovakia (clay)
Czechoslovakia	3
Poland	2
bye
Romania

Semifinals; 13–15 July
Paris, France (clay)
France	2
Great Britain	3
Prague, Czechoslovakia (clay)
Czechoslovakia	5
Romania	0

Final; 15–17 September
Eastbourne, United Kingdom (grass)
Great Britain	5
Czechoslovakia	0

==== Final ====
Great Britain vs. Czechoslovakia

Great Britain
5
Devonshire Park, Eastbourne, United Kingdom
15–17 September 1978
Grass

Czechoslovakia
0

			1	2	3	4	5
1	(United Kingdom) (Czechoslovakia)	John Lloyd; Jiří Hřebec	9; 7	6; 3	4; 6	5; 7	12; 10
2	(United Kingdom) (Czechoslovakia)	Buster Mottram; Ivan Lendl	6; 4	7; 5	7; 5
3	(United Kingdom) (Czechoslovakia)	Mark Cox / David Lloyd; Jan Kodeš / Tomáš Šmíd	6; 4	13; 15	6; 4	2; 6	6; 4
4	(United Kingdom) (Czechoslovakia)	Mark Cox; Ivan Lendl	6; 2	6; 4	6; 3
5	(United Kingdom) (Czechoslovakia)	Buster Mottram; Jiří Hřebec	5; 7	3; 6	6; 3	6; 4	6; 0

=== Zone B ===
==== Pre-qualifying round ====
Pre-qualifying round
Casablanca, Morocco
Morocco	5
Turkey	0

==== Preliminary rounds ====
First Round
Casablanca, Morocco (clay)
Morocco	4
Norway	1
bye
Yugoslavia
Dublin, Ireland (grass)
Ireland	4
Portugal	1
bye
Sweden
Hungary
bye
Brussels, Belgium (clay)
Belgium	3
Denmark	2
Lucerne, Switzerland
Switzerland	5
Egypt	0
bye
West Germany

Qualifying Round
Casablanca, Morocco
Morocco	0
Yugoslavia	5
Dublin, Ireland (indoor hard)
Ireland	0
Sweden	5
Pécs, Hungary
Hungary	4
Belgium	1
Zürich, Switzerland
Switzerland	0
West Germany	5

==== Main Draw ====
Quarterfinals; 13–18 June
Spain
bye
Belgrade, Yugoslavia (clay)
Yugoslavia	2
Sweden	3
Budapest, Hungary
Hungary	3
West Germany	2
bye
Italy

Semifinals; 13–16 July
Båstad, Sweden (clay)
Spain	2
Sweden	3
Budapest, Hungary
Hungary	4
Italy	1

Final; 15–17 September
Båstad, Sweden (clay)
Sweden	3
Hungary	1

==== Final ====
Sweden vs. Hungary

Sweden
3
Båstad Tennis Stadium, Båstad, Sweden
15–17 September 1978
Clay

Hungary
1

			1	2	3	4	5
1	(Sweden) (Hungary)	Kjell Johansson; Balázs Taróczy	7; 5	6; 2	6; 4
2	(Sweden) (Hungary)	Björn Borg; Péter Szőke	6; 2	6; 0	6; 0
3	(Sweden) (Hungary)	Ove Bengtson / Tenny Svensson; Péter Szőke / Balázs Taróczy	2; 6	1; 6	10; 12
4	(Sweden) (Hungary)	Kjell Johansson; Péter Szőke	3; 6	7; 5	6; 1	3; 6	6; 1
5	(Sweden) (Hungary)	Tenny Svensson; Balázs Taróczy	2; 6	6; 4	5; 5			not completed

== Inter-Zonal Zone ==
=== Draw ===
Semifinals; 6–8 October
Gothenburg, Sweden (indoor carpet)
EUR-B	Sweden	2
AME	United States	3
London, United Kingdom (indoor carpet)
EAS	Australia	2
EUR-A	Great Britain	3

Final; 8–10 December
Rancho Mirage, CA, United States (hard)
AME	United States	4
EUR-A	Great Britain	1

=== Semifinals ===
Sweden vs. United States

Sweden
2
Scandinavium, Gothenburg, Sweden
6–8 October 1978
Carpet (indoors)

United States
3

			1	2	3	4	5
1	(Sweden) (United States)	Björn Borg; Arthur Ashe	6; 4	7; 5	6; 3
2	(Sweden) (United States)	Kjell Johansson; Vitas Gerulaitis	2; 6	1; 6	4; 6
3	(Sweden) (United States)	Ove Bengtson / Björn Borg; Bob Lutz / Stan Smith	6; 2	3; 6	6; 3	5; 7	3; 6
4	(Sweden) (United States)	Kjell Johansson; Arthur Ashe	2; 6	0; 6	5; 7
5	(Sweden) (United States)	Björn Borg; Vitas Gerulaitis	6; 3	6; 1

Great Britain vs. Australia

Great Britain
3
National Sports Centre, London, United Kingdom
6–8 October 1978
Carpet (indoors)

Australia
2

			1	2	3	4	5
1	(United Kingdom) (Australia)	Buster Mottram; Tony Roche	8; 6	3; 6	7; 5	6; 4
2	(United Kingdom) (Australia)	John Lloyd; John Alexander	7; 5	6; 2	6; 2
3	(United Kingdom) (Australia)	Mark Cox / David Lloyd; Ross Case / Geoff Masters	8; 6	3; 6	6; 4	6; 3
4	(United Kingdom) (Australia)	John Lloyd; Tony Roche	3; 6	3; 6	2; 6
5	(United Kingdom) (Australia)	Buster Mottram; John Alexander	2; 6	3; 6	2; 6

=== Final ===
United States vs. Great Britain

United States
4
Mission Hills Country Club, Rancho Mirage, CA, United States
8–10 December 1978
Hard

Great Britain
1

			1	2	3	4	5
1	(United States) (United Kingdom)	John McEnroe; John Lloyd	6; 1	6; 2	6; 2
2	(United States) (United Kingdom)	Brian Gottfried; Buster Mottram	6; 4	6; 2	8; 10	4; 6	3; 6
3	(United States) (United Kingdom)	Bob Lutz / Stan Smith; Mark Cox / David Lloyd	6; 2	6; 2	6; 3
4	(United States) (United Kingdom)	John McEnroe; Buster Mottram	6; 2	6; 2	6; 1
5	(United States) (United Kingdom)	Brian Gottfried; John Lloyd	6; 1	6; 2	6; 4
