= Dragan Savić =

Serbian former professional tennis player and coach

- Country (sports): (Socialist Federal Republic of Yugoslavia) Yugoslavia
- Plays: Right-handed

Singles
- Career record: 0–5
- Career titles: 0
- Highest ranking: No. 282 (15 December 1975)

Grand Slam singles results
- French Open: Q2 (1975)

Doubles
- Career record: 1–3
- Career titles: 0

Grand Slam doubles results
- Australian Open: 2R (1975)

Team competitions
- Davis Cup: 3–1
Medal record
Mediterranean Games
Silver medal – second place	1975 Algiers	Singles
Bronze medal – third place	1975 Algiers	Doubles

Dragan Savić is a Serbian former professional tennis player who competed for Yugoslavia.

Savić is a former coach of Serbian tennis players Slobodan Živojinović and Nenad Zimonjić.

== Career ==
Savić played in two Davis Cup ties for Yugoslavia in 1978 and 1981 and won three of his four rubbers.

== Personal ==
He is the father of banned Serbian tennis player David Savić.
