= Marc Albert (tennis) =

Dutch tennis player

- Country (sports): Netherlands
- Born: 14 June 1960 (age 64)

Singles
- Career record: 0–6 (ATP Tour & Davis Cup)
- Highest ranking: No. 305 (18 Mar 1985)

Doubles
- Career record: 1–7 (ATP Tour & Davis Cup)
- Highest ranking: No. 314 (18 Mar 1985)

Marc Albert (born 14 June 1960) is a Dutch former professional tennis player.

Albert, a native of Eijsden, was a three-time national doubles champion with partners Huub van Boeckel (twice) and Johan Vekemans. He was talked about as a successor to Tom Okker due to his junior success, but didn't have an impact on tour.

In 1981 he represented the Netherlands in the Davis Cup, featuring in three ties. He won one of his three doubles rubbers and was beaten in his only singles rubber by the Soviet Union's Sergey Leonyuk in five sets.

== See also ==
- List of Netherlands Davis Cup team representatives
