= Peter Lamb (tennis) =

South African tennis player

- Country (sports): South Africa
- Born: 12 March 1959 (age 66)
- Plays: Right-handed

Singles
- Career record: 1–3
- Highest ranking: No. 440 (22 December 1980)

Grand Slam singles results
- Wimbledon: Q1 (1980)

Doubles
- Career record: 1–5
- Highest ranking: No. 853 (3 January 1983)

Grand Slam doubles results
- US Open: 1R (1977)

Peter Lamb (born 12 March 1959) is a South African tennis player, who was selected for the national Davis Cup team in 1978, probably mostly to appease protesters against the Apartheid politics of the then South Africa. He was the first ever "coloured" player in the South African national tennis team. He competed at Vanderbilt University and later received an MBA from Harvard Business School.
