= Kevin Menton =

Irish tennis player

- Country (sports): (Republic of Ireland) Ireland

Singles
- Career record: 2–9 (Davis Cup)

Kevin Menton is an Irish former tennis player.

Menton is a son of association football administrator Brendan Menton and attended St Paul's College, Raheny. He was also involved in football during his youth, captaining his college to a Leinster Schools Cup title.

A Leinster inter–provincial representative, Menton won four successive singles titles at the County Dublin Championships from 1976 to 1979. He played Davis Cup for Ireland during the 1970s as a singles specialist, with appearances in seven ties. This included a 1978 tie against a strong Swedish team in Dublin, where he was beaten by Kjell Johansson without winning a game.

== See also ==
- List of Ireland Davis Cup team representatives
