= Louk Sanders =

Dutch tennis player

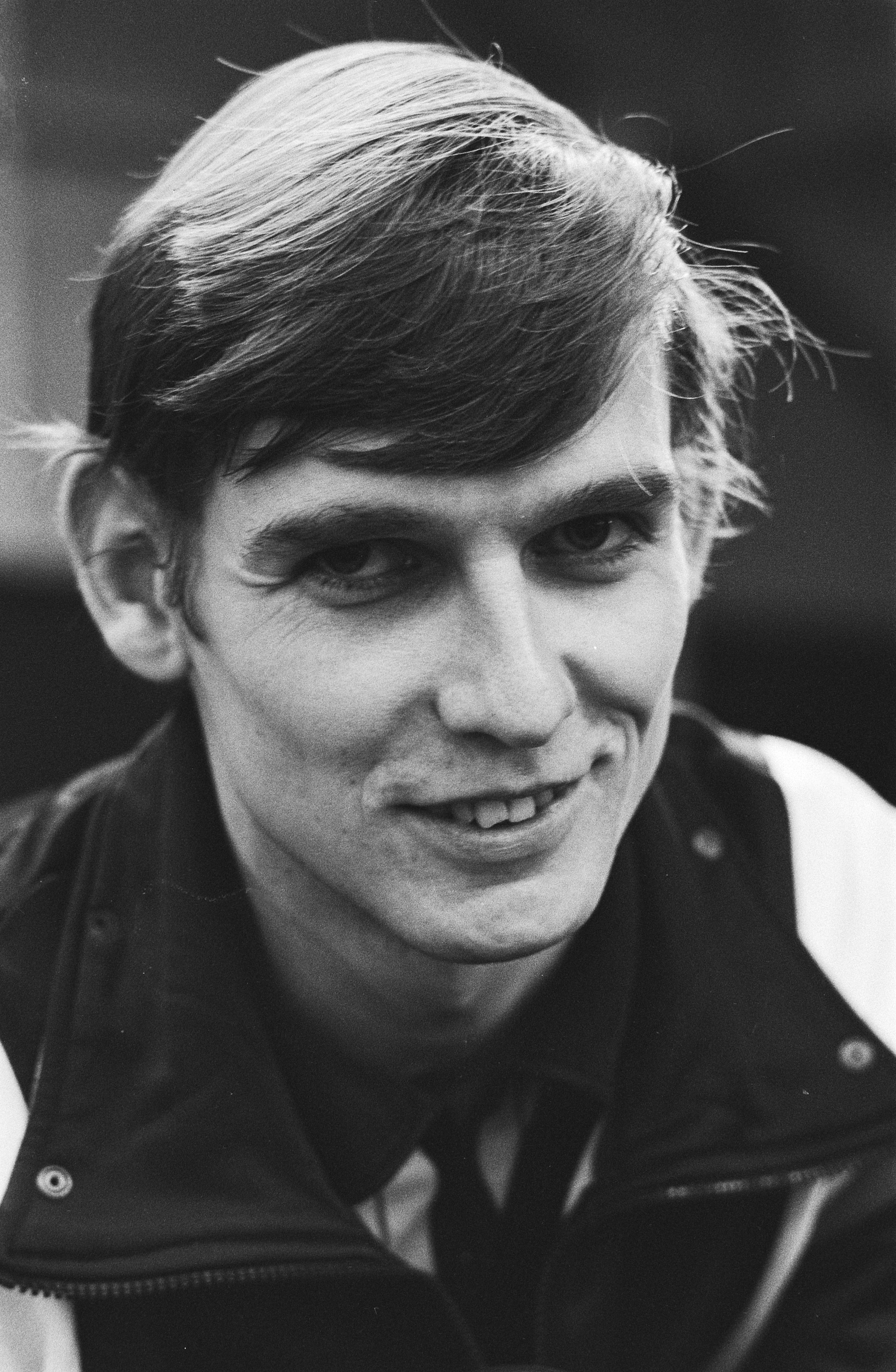
- Louk Sanders in 1978
- Country (sports): Netherlands
- Born: 9 May 1950 (age 74); Oegstgeest, Netherlands
- Turned pro: 1976
- Plays: Right-handed

Singles
- Career record: 49–79
- Highest ranking: No. 98 (31 December 1977)

Grand Slam singles results
- French Open: 3R (1979)
- Wimbledon: 1R (1978)

Doubles
- Career record: 31–55
- Career titles: 1

Louk Sanders (born 9 May 1950) is a retired professional tennis player from the Netherlands.

Sanders was Holland's second best in the 1970s after Tom Okker. The right-hander reached his highest individual ranking on the ATP Tour on 31 December 1977, when he became the number 86 of the world. Sanders played for the Dutch Davis Cup team from 1974 to 1983. His best Grand Slam performance was reaching the third round of the French Open in 1979.

== Career finals ==
=== Doubles (1 title, 1 runner-up) ===
Result	W/L	Date	Tournament	Surface	Partner	Opponents	Score
Win	1–0	Sep 1978	Bournemouth, England	Clay	(Netherlands) Rolf Thung	(Australia) David Carter (Australia) Rod Frawley	6–3, 6–4
Loss	1–1	Jul 1981	Kitzbühel, Austria	Clay	(Socialist Federal Republic of Yugoslavia) Marko Ostoja	(Australia) David Carter (Australia) Paul Kronk	6–7, 1–6
