= Matti Timonen =

Finnish tennis player

- Country (sports): Finland
- Born: 10 October 1953 (age 71)

Singles
- Career record: 1–5
- Highest ranking: No. 257 (8 Apr 1975)

Grand Slam singles results
- Wimbledon: Q2 (1975)

Matti Timonen (born 10 October 1953) is a Finnish former professional tennis player.

Timonen won 24 national championships, including three outdoor and five indoor singles titles. On the professional tour, he was ranked as high as 257 in the world and had a second round appearance at the 1975 New Zealand Open, where he lost in five sets to the fourth-seeded Syd Ball. He played for the Finland Davis Cup team from 1972 to 1982, featuring in 35 rubbers. In 1980 he won a singles rubber over France's Pascal Portes.

== See also ==
- List of Finland Davis Cup team representatives
