= Hans Kary =

Austrian tennis player (born 1949)

- Country (sports): Austria
- Born: 23 February 1949 (age 76); Spittal, Austria
- Height: 1.72 m (5 ft 7 1/2 in)
- Plays: Left-handed

Singles
- Career record: 142–202
- Career titles: 1
- Highest ranking: No. 54 (31 May 1976)

Grand Slam singles results
- Australian Open: 1R (1973)
- French Open: 2R (1970, 1975, 1977)
- Wimbledon: 2R (1972, 1973)
- US Open: 2R (1975)

Doubles
- Career record: 104–158
- Career titles: 3
- Highest ranking: No. 124 (3 January 1983)

Hans Kary (born 23 February 1949) is a former professional tennis player from Austria.

During his career, Kary won one singles title and three doubles titles. He achieved a career-high singles ranking of world no. 54 in 1976 and a career-high doubles ranking of world no. 124 in 1983.

== Career finals ==
=== Singles (1 title, 1 runner-ups) ===
Result	W/L	Date	Tournament	Surface	Opponent	Score
Loss	0–1	Aug 1972	Hilversum, Netherlands	Clay	(Australia) John Cooper	1–6, 6–3, 10–12, 6–3, 2–6
Win	1–1	Mar 1979	Lagos, Nigeria	Hard	(Austria) Peter Feigl	6–4, 3–6, 6–2

=== Doubles (3 titles, 1 runner-up) ===
Result	W/L	Date	Tournament	Surface	Partner	Opponents	Score
Win	1–0	Feb 1975	Richmond WCT, U.S.	Carpet (i)	(United States) Fred McNair	(Italy) Paolo Bertolucci (Italy) Adriano Panatta	7–6, 5–7, 7–6
Loss	1–1	Jun 1975	Düsseldorf, West Germany	Clay	(West Germany) Harald Elschenbroich	(France) François Jauffret (Czechoslovakia) Jan Kodeš	2–6, 3–6
Win	2–1	Mar 1977	Helsinki, Finland	Carpet (i)	(Czechoslovakia) Jiří Hřebec	(United Kingdom) David Lloyd (United Kingdom) John Lloyd	5–7, 7–6, 6–4
Win	3–1	Feb 1982	Buenos Aires, Argentina	Clay	(Hungary) Zoltán Kuhárszky	(Spain) Ángel Giménez (Spain) Manuel Orantes	7–5, 6–2
