= David Lloyd (tennis) =

English tennis player and entrepreneur

- Country (sports): United Kingdom
- Residence: Oxshott, Surrey
- Born: 3 January 1948 (age 78) Leigh-on-Sea, Essex
- Plays: Right-handed

Singles
- Career record: 26–60
- Career titles: 14
- Highest ranking: No. 128 (13 September 1973)

Grand Slam singles results
- French Open: 1R (1968, 1969, 1970, 1971, 1973)
- Wimbledon: 3R (1968)
- US Open: 1R (1969)

Doubles
- Career record: 46–56
- Career titles: 1

Grand Slam doubles results
- French Open: QF (1970)
- Wimbledon: SF (1973)
- US Open: 1R (1969, 1977)

David Alan Lloyd (born 3 January 1948) is an English former professional tennis player and entrepreneur. He founded the fitness and leisure business David Lloyd Leisure in 1982.

He was born in Leigh-on-Sea, Essex. He and his younger brother John Lloyd became two of the most successful British tennis players throughout the 1970s and 1980s. David captained the British Davis Cup team and was active in the Lawn Tennis Association.

For a short time he was chairman of Hull City A.F.C. and Hull FC.

== Tennis career ==
David Lloyd grew up in Westcliff-on-Sea near Southend and began playing tennis at Westcliff Hard LTC, where his parents were members, together with his brothers Tony and John.

In 1965 he won both singles and doubles titles at the British Junior championships held at Wimbledon and the following year was runner up in the junior singles (losing in the final to future rugby star J. P. R. Williams). In 1972, he reached the last 32 at Wimbledon, losing to Australian former world No. 1, John Newcombe.

He was a member of Great Britain's Davis Cup squad between 1972 and 1974, and again between 1976 and 1980, and in 1978, was part of the first British team to reach the final since 1937. In 1976, he and his brother John won a doubles title in London.

He retired from professional tennis in 1981, having attained a career-high of No. 128 in the world singles rankings (September 1973) and 40 in the world doubles ranking (August 1977).

He was appointed British Davis Cup captain in 1995 and went on to work in the Lawn Tennis Association, and coached Tim Henman.

== David Lloyd Leisure ==
Following his retirement from professional tennis, Lloyd worked for a number of years as a coach at a tennis club in Canada. On his return to Britain he founded the David Lloyd Leisure Clubs, opening the first club in Heston, near Hounslow in west London, in 1982.

The business was floated on the London Stock Exchange in 1992 and by 1995, there were 18 David Lloyd Leisure clubs, when Whitbread Plc acquired the company for a reported £200 million, incorporating it into its Restaurants & Leisure Division. Lloyd remained as managing director of the division until 1996.

Lloyd, together with his son Scott, went on to create Next Generation fitness clubs and in 2007, London & Regional Properties in partnership with Bank of Scotland, acquired David Lloyd Leisure from Whitbread and incorporated Next Generation into the group, in a deal worth £925 million.

In 2013 the group was taken over by TDR Capital and now includes 89 UK and European David Lloyd Leisure Clubs, two Harbour Clubs and five David Lloyd Studios, with a membership of around 440,000.

== Property and other businesses ==
Following the sale of the leisure business, Lloyd developed the Sugar Hill Resort in Barbados.

Lloyd was later involved in the development of an estate in Phuket, Thailand and the building of a villa near Marbella in Spain.

In May 2007, Lloyd bought the collection of artist Willard Wigan, estimated to be valued at £11.2 million.

== Career titles ==
=== Doubles (1 title, 2 runner-ups) ===
Result	No.	Date	Tournament	Surface	Partner	Opponents	Score
Win	1–0	Nov 1976	Dewar Cup, London, UK	Carpet	(United Kingdom) John Lloyd	(United Kingdom) John Feaver (Australia) John James	6–4, 3–6, 6–2
Loss	1–1	Mar 1977	Helsinki, Finland	Carpet (i)	(United Kingdom) John Lloyd	(Czechoslovakia) Jiří Hřebec (Austria) Hans Kary	7–5, 6–7, 4–6
Loss	1–2	Jun 1977	Queen's Club, London, UK	Grass	(United Kingdom) John Lloyd	(India) Anand Amritraj (India) Vijay Amritraj	1–6, 2–6

Business positions
Preceded by Martin Fish	Hull City A.F.C. chairman 1997-1998	Succeeded by Nick Buchanan
