= Zoltan Ilin =

Serbian professional tennis player

- Country (sports): (Socialist Federal Republic of Yugoslavia) Yugoslavia
- Born: 30 January 1955 (age 71) Subotica, PR Serbia, FPR Yugoslavia
- Plays: Right-handed

Singles
- Career record: 1–9
- Career titles: 0
- Highest ranking: No. 309 (22 Dec 1980)

Grand Slam singles results
- French Open: 1R (1980)

Doubles
- Career record: 0–6
- Career titles: 0
- Highest ranking: No. 424 (3 Jan 1979)

Team competitions
- Davis Cup: 8–11
Medal record
Mediterranean Games
Silver medal – second place	1979 Split	Singles
Silver medal – second place	1979 Split	Doubles
Bronze medal – third place	1975 Algiers	Doubles

Zoltan Ilin (Serbian Cyrillic: Золтан Илин; born 30 January 1955) is a Serbian former professional tennis player who competed for Yugoslavia.

== Career ==
Ilin competed in the 1980 French Open but was unable to get past 13th seed Wojciech Fibak in the first round, losing in straight sets.

He played in seven Davis Cup ties for Yugoslavia from 1977 to 1981 and won eight of his 19 rubbers.
