= Bernard Balleret =

Monegasque tennis player (born 1954)

- Country (sports): Monaco
- Born: 11 May 1954 (age 71) Paris, France
- Height: 1.78 m (5 ft 10 in)
- Plays: Right-handed

Singles
- Career record: 1–6
- Career titles: 0
- Highest ranking: No. 310 (12 December 1976)

Grand Slam singles results
- French Open: 1R (1976, 1983)

Doubles
- Career record: 1–5
- Career titles: 0
- Highest ranking: No. 614 (24 February 1986)

Grand Slam doubles results
- French Open: 2R (1979)

Bernard Balleret (born 11 May 1954) is a French-born Monegasque professional tennis player.

== Career ==
Balleret participated in the main draw of three French Opens during his career. He lost to American Fred McNair in the opening round of the 1976 French Open and also exited in the first round of the doubles, partnering Louis Borfiga. In 1979 he teamed up with Jacques Thamin and the pair made it to the second round, with a win over the French pairing of Bernard Fritz and Patrick Proisy. He played in the singles at the 1983 French Open but was again defeated in the opening round, this time by Christophe Roger-Vasselin.

Over a span of 19 years, Balleret regularly appeared in Davis Cup ties for Monaco, playing a total of 30 ties. He won 21 of his 43 singles rubbers and eight of his 25 doubles matches. His combined tally of 29 wins remains, as of 2012, a national record. He last played for Monaco in 1991, against Luxembourg, a week before his 37th birthday.

He is the father of Benjamin Balleret, another professional tennis player, and remarried to former top 50 player Alexia Dechaume.
