= Thierry Stevaux =

Belgian tennis player

- Country (sports): Belgium
- Born: 14 June 1956 (age 68)
- Plays: Right-handed

Singles
- Career record: 2–11
- Career titles: 0
- Highest ranking: No. 195 (4 Jan 1982)

Grand Slam singles results
- French Open: 1R (1980)

Doubles
- Career record: 5-7
- Career titles: 1
- Highest ranking: No. 185 (3 Jan 1983)

Grand Slam doubles results
- French Open: 1R (1981, 1982, 1983)

Thierry Stevaux (born 14 June 1956) is a former professional tennis player from Belgium.

== Career ==
Stevaux played Davis Cup tennis for Belgium from 1977 to 1982. He appeared in a total of eight ties and finished with a 6/10 overall record, winning four of his 10 singles rubbers and two of his six doubles matches.

The Belgian took part in the 1980 French Open and was beaten in the opening round by Marko Ostoja, in four sets. Stevaux played men's doubles at the French Open three times, with Alain Brichant in 1981 and Wayne Hampson in 1982 and 1983. He lost in the first round each time.

Stevaux, partnering Steve Krulevitz, won the doubles title at the Brussels Outdoor Grand Prix tournament in 1980.

== Grand Prix career finals ==
=== Doubles: 1 (1–0) ===
Result	W/L	Date	Tournament	Surface	Partner	Opponents	Score
Win	1–0	Jun 1980	Brussels, Belgium	Clay	(United States) Steve Krulevitz	(United States) Eric Fromm (United States) Cary Leeds	6–3, 7–5

== Challenger titles ==
=== Doubles: (1) ===
W/L	Date	Tournament	Surface	Partner	Opponents	Score
1–0	1982	Porto, Portugal	Clay	(Czechoslovakia) Libor Pimek	(United States) Andy Kohlberg (South Africa) Robbie Venter	4–6, 7–6, 7–5
