= Péter Szőke =

Hungarian tennis player (1947–2022)

- Country (sports): Hungary
- Born: 8 August 1947 Mosonszentjános, Hungary
- Died: 28 July 2022 (aged 74)
- Plays: Left-handed

Singles
- Career record: 43–64
- Career titles: 0
- Highest ranking: No. 47 (23 August 1973)

Grand Slam singles results
- Australian Open: 1R (1973)
- French Open: 3R (1970)
- Wimbledon: 1R (1967, 1971, 1972, 1974)

Doubles
- Career record: 32–52
- Career titles: 0

Grand Slam doubles results
- French Open: 2R (1970, 1971, 1972)
- Wimbledon: 2R (1971, 1972)

Grand Slam mixed doubles results
- Wimbledon: 2R (1971)

Péter Szőke (8 August 1947 – 28 July 2022) was a Hungarian tennis player. He did not win any top-level titles during his professional career, finishing runner-up once in singles and four times in doubles. He reached his highest ATP singles ranking of World No. 47 in August 1973.

Szőke participated in 27 Davis Cup ties for Hungary from 1967 and 1983, posting a 9–15 record in singles and a 17–6 record in doubles.

== ATP tour finals ==
=== Singles (1 runner-up) ===
Result	W-L	Date	Tournament	Surface	Opponent	Score
Loss	0–1	1971	Hamburg, Germany	Clay	(Spain) Andrés Gimeno	3–6, 2–6, 2–6

=== Doubles (4 runner-ups) ===
Result	W-L	Date	Tournament	Surface	Partner	Opponents	Score
Loss	0–1	1973	Calgary, Canada	Indoor	(Hungary) Szabolcs Baranyi	(United States) Mike Estep (Romania) Ilie Năstase	7–6, 5–7, 3–6
Loss	0–2	1976	Florence, Italy	Clay	(Hungary) Balázs Taróczy	(Australia) Colin Dibley (Brazil) Carlos Kirmayr	7–5, 5–7, 5–7
Loss	0–3	1978	Båstad, Sweden	Clay	(Hungary) Balázs Taróczy	(Australia) Bob Carmichael (Australia) Mark Edmondson	5–7, 4–6
Loss	0–4	1979	Linz, Austria	Hard (i)	(Hungary) Szabolcs Baranyi	(France) Patrice Dominguez (France) Gilles Moretton	1–6, 4–6
