= Yugoslavia Davis Cup team =

Historic Yugoslav Davis Cup team representing Yugoslavia

Yugoslavia
- First year: 1927
- Years played: 69
- Ties played (W–L): 152 (85–67)
- Years in World Group: 9 (7–9)
- Most total wins: Josip Palada (42–32); Franjo Punčec (42–20)
- Most singles wins: Franjo Punčec (33–12)
- Most doubles wins: Dragutin Mitić (13–14)
- Best doubles team: Boro Jovanović and Niki Pilić (7–8)
- Most ties played: Josip Palada (37)
- Most years played: Boro Jovanović and Josip Palada (15)

The Yugoslavia men's national tennis team competed from 1927 to 2003 and represented the Kingdom of Yugoslavia (up to 1929 known as the Kingdom of Serbs, Croats and Slovenes) from 1927 to 1939, the Socialist Federal Republic of Yugoslavia (up to 1963 the Federal People's Republic of Yugoslavia) from 1946 to 1992, and the Federal Republic of Yugoslavia from 1995 to 2003. It was organised by the Yugoslav Tennis Association. Following the breakup of Yugoslavia in the 1990s, separate teams were created for the new nations which split apart from Yugoslavia:

- Croatia men's national tennis team (began competing in 1993)
- Slovenia men's national tennis team (began competing in 1993)
- North Macedonia men's national tennis team (began competing in 1995 as the former Yugoslav Republic of Macedonia)
- Bosnia and Herzegovina men's national tennis team (began competing in 1996)

A team representing the Federal Republic of Yugoslavia returned to competing again from 1995. From 2003 this country was renamed Serbia and Montenegro and the Davis Cup team was renamed to reflect the same from 2004, bringing to an end Yugoslav participation in the Davis Cup. Following further splits in 2006, several new teams were created for the relevant constituent parts:

- Serbia Davis Cup team (began competing in 2007)
- Montenegro Davis Cup team (began competing in 2007)
- Kosovo Davis Cup team (began competing in 2016)

For history and records of the Federal Republic of Yugoslavia (consisting of only Montenegro and of Serbia) and the State Union of Serbia and Montenegro, see Serbia and Montenegro Davis Cup team.

In 1952, Dragutin Mitić and Milan Branović, with 29 ties and 4 ties respectively, defected from the Federal People's Republic of Yugoslavia.

== Players ==
- Josip Palada – 37 ties
- Dragutin Mitić – 29 ties
- Franjo Punčec – 26 ties
- Boro Jovanović – 25 ties
- Nikola Pilić – 23 ties
- Željko Franulović – 22 ties
- Slobodan Živojinović – 21 ties
- Franjo Kukuljević – 18 ties
- Marko Ostoja – 11 ties
- Ilija Panajotovic – 11 ties
- Zoltan Ilin – 7 ties
- Vladimir Petrović – 7 ties
- Franjo Šefer – 7 ties
- Krešimir Friedrich – 3 ties

== Win–loss record ==
Player	Total W–L	Singles W–L	Doubles W–L	Ties played	Debut	Years played
Željko Franulović	32–27	23–15	9–12	22	1967	12
Boro Jovanović	29–36	18–22	11–14	25	1959	15
Franjo Kukuljević	11–21	5–9	6–12	18	1930	10
Dragutin Mitić	41–29	28–15	13–14	29	1936	10
Josip Palada	42–32	31–21	11–11	37	1933	15
Ilija Panajotović	5–15	3–12	2–3	11	1953	8
Nikola Pilić	38–24	27–12	11–12	23	1961	11
Franjo Punčec	42–20	33–12	9–8	26	1933	8
Slobodan Živojinović	36–26	24–15	12–11	24	1981	12

=== Results ===
Kingdom of Yugoslavia

- 1927 – Europe zone, 2nd round (bye, losing to India 0–3)
- 1928 – Europe zone, 1st round (losing to Finland 1–4)
- 1929 – Europe zone, 1st round (losing to Greece 1–4)
- 1930 – Europe zone, 2nd round (beating Sweden 5–0, losing to Spain 0–5)
- 1931 – Europe zone, 2nd round (bye, losing to Japan 0–5)
- 1932 – Europe zone, 2nd round (bye, losing to Denmark 1–4)

== See also ==
- Davis Cup
- Yugoslavia Fed Cup team
- Yugoslavia at the Hopman Cup
