= 1976 Davis Cup Americas Zone =

International tennis competition

The Americas Zone was one of the three regional zones of the 1976 Davis Cup.

This year's tournament saw all teams in the Americas Zone competing in one single bracket, with the previous North & Central America and South America sub-zones, and subsequently the Americas Inter-Zonal final, being eliminated. This brought the Americas Zone in line with the outline of the other zones, with the previous year's Americas sub-zone champions progressing to the new Americas main draw semifinals.

14 teams entered the Americas Zone in total, with 12 teams competing in the preliminary rounds to advance to the main draw and join the previous year's finalists South Africa and Chile. The winner of the main draw went on to compete in the Inter-Zonal Zone against the winners of the Eastern Zone and Europe Zone.

Chile defeated South Africa in the final and progressed to the Inter-Zonal Zone.

== Preliminary rounds ==
=== Draw ===
First Round
United States
bye
Venezuela
bye
Mexico City, Mexico (clay)
Mexico	5
Caribbean/West Indies	0
Montreal, Canada (indoor carpet)
Canada	5
Colombia	0
Brazil	w/o
Bolivia
Lima, Peru
Peru	3
Uruguay	2
bye
Ecuador
bye
Argentina

Qualifying Round
Tucson, AZ, United States (hard)
United States	5
Venezuela	0
Mexico City, Mexico (clay)
Mexico	3
Canada	2
Brasília, Brazil
Brazil	5
Peru	0
Guayaquil, Ecuador (clay)
Ecuador	0
Argentina	5

=== First round ===
Mexico vs. Caribbean/West Indies

Mexico
5
Estadio Rafael Osuna, Mexico City, Mexico
7–9 November 1975
Clay

Caribbean/West Indies
0

			1	2	3	4	5
1	(Mexico) (Cricket West Indies)	Luis Baraldi; Richard Russell	6; 2	6; 1	6; 4
2	(Mexico) (Cricket West Indies)	Marcello Lara; John Antonas	6; 1	6; 3	6; 2
3	(Mexico) (Cricket West Indies)	Roberto Chávez / Adolfo González; Alan Price / Michael Valdez	6; 4	6; 4	6; 4
4	(Mexico) (Cricket West Indies)	Marcello Lara; Richard Russell	6; 0	6; 0	6; 4
5	(Mexico) (Cricket West Indies)	Luis Baraldi; John Antonas	6; 3	6; 1	6; 1

Canada vs. Colombia

Canada
5
Rockland Tennis Club, Montreal, Canada
17–19 October 1975
Carpet (indoors)

Colombia
0

			1	2	3	4	5
1	(Canada) (Colombia)	Tony Bardsley; Orlando Agudelo	6; 0	6; 3	6; 2
2	(Canada) (Colombia)	Dale Power; Álvaro Betancur	6; 4	22; 24	2; 6	6; 3	7; 5
3	(Canada) (Colombia)	Tony Bardsley / Réjean Genois; Orlando Agudelo / Álvaro Betancur	6; 2	9; 7	6; 4
4	(Canada) (Colombia)	Tony Bardsley; Javier Restrepo	6; 2	6; 4	6; 2
5	(Canada) (Colombia)	Réjean Genois; Orlando Agudelo	6; 1	6; 4	7; 5

Peru vs. Uruguay

Peru
3
Lima, Peru
26–28 September 1975

Uruguay
2

			1	2	3	4	5
1	(Peru) (Uruguay)	Fernando Maynetto; Fabian Barriola	5; 7	1; 6	4; 6
2	(Peru) (Uruguay)	Miguel Maurtúa; Gustavo Stapf	6; 1	6; 0	6; 4
3	(Peru) (Uruguay)	Miguel Maurtúa / Fernando Maynetto; Fabian Barriola / Alberto Laborde	6; 3	3; 6	6; 4	3; 6	7; 5
4	(Peru) (Uruguay)	Miguel Maurtúa; Fabian Barriola	7; 5	6; 1	6; 4
5	(Peru) (Uruguay)	Fernando Maynetto; Gustavo Stapf	6; 8	6; 2	5; 7	7; 9

=== Qualifying round ===
United States vs. Venezuela

United States
5
Margaret Court Racquet Club, Tucson, AZ, United States
17–19 October 1975
Hard

Venezuela
0

			1	2	3	4	5
1	(United States) (Venezuela)	Jimmy Connors; Humphrey Hose	6; 4	6; 1	6; 3
2	(United States) (Venezuela)	Roscoe Tanner; Jorge Andrew	6; 4	6; 3	6; 2
3	(United States) (Venezuela)	Dick Stockton / Erik van Dillen; Jorge Andrew / Humphrey Hose	6; 2	6; 2	7; 5
4	(United States) (Venezuela)	Jimmy Connors; Jorge Andrew	6; 2	6; 1	6; 2
5	(United States) (Venezuela)	Roscoe Tanner; Humphrey Hose	3; 6	6; 3	6; 2	6; 4

Mexico vs. Canada

Mexico
3
Estadio Rafael Osuna, Mexico City, Mexico
28–30 November 1975
Clay

Canada
2

			1	2	3	4	5
1	(Mexico) (Canada)	Joaquín Loyo Mayo; Réjean Genois	4; 6	6; 1	6; 2	8; 6
2	(Mexico) (Canada)	Marcello Lara; Dale Power	6; 2	6; 1	6; 2
3	(Mexico) (Canada)	Luis Baraldi / Roberto Chávez; Tony Bardsley / Réjean Genois	6; 2	4; 6	4; 6	8; 6	4; 6
4	(Mexico) (Canada)	Joaquín Loyo Mayo; Dale Power	6; 4	2; 6	6; 1	1; 6	5; 7
5	(Mexico) (Canada)	Marcello Lara; Réjean Genois	4; 6	6; 2	1; 6	6; 1	7; 5

Brazil vs. Peru

Brazil
5
Brasília, Brazil
19–21 December 1975

Peru
0

			1	2	3	4	5
1	(Brazil) (Peru)	Carlos Kirmayr; Alfredo Acuna	6; 0	6; 0	6; 0
2	(Brazil) (Peru)	José Edison Mandarino; Miguel Maurtúa	6; 4	4; 6	6; 2	4; 6	6; 3
3	(Brazil) (Peru)	Fernando Gentil / Carlos Kirmayr; Fernando Carlos / Miguel Maurtúa	6; 2	6; 3	6; 3
4	(Brazil) (Peru)	José Edison Mandarino; Alfredo Acuna	6; 1	6; 3	3; 6	7; 5
5	(Brazil) (Peru)	Carlos Kirmayr; Miguel Maurtúa	6; 1	6; 4	6; 1

Ecuador vs. Argentina

Ecuador
0
Guayaquil Tennis Club, Guayaquil, Ecuador
31 October–2 November 1975
Clay

Argentina
5

			1	2	3	4	5
1	(Ecuador) (Argentina)	Ricardo Ycaza; Julián Ganzábal	6; 8	2; 6	6; 3	9; 11
2	(Ecuador) (Argentina)	Gonzalo Núñez; Ricardo Cano	6; 3	1; 6	6; 4	2; 6	2; 6
3	(Ecuador) (Argentina)	Miguel Olvera / Ricardo Ycaza; Lito Álvarez / Ricardo Cano	4; 6	3; 6	13; 11	4; 6
4	(Ecuador) (Argentina)	Gonzalo Núñez; Julián Ganzábal	1; 6	1; 6	0; 6
5	(Ecuador) (Argentina)	Ricardo Ycaza; Ricardo Cano	4; 6	4; 6	5; 7

== Main draw ==
=== Draw ===
Quarterfinals; 19–28 December 1975
South Africa
bye
Mexico City, Mexico (clay)
United States	2
Mexico	3
Buenos Aires, Argentina (clay)
Brazil	0
Argentina	5
bye
Chile

Semifinals; 5–7 March
South Africa	w/o
Mexico
Santiago, Chile (clay)
Argentina	2
Chile	3

Final; 26–28 April
Santiago, Chile
South Africa	2
Chile	3

=== Quarterfinals ===
Mexico vs. United States

Mexico
3
Estadio Rafael Osuna, Mexico City, Mexico
19–21 December 1975
Clay

United States
2

			1	2	3	4	5
1	(Mexico) (United States)	Marcello Lara; Jimmy Connors	2; 6	1; 6	6; 3	6; 4	5; 7
2	(Mexico) (United States)	Raúl Ramírez; Brian Gottfried	6; 1	6; 4	6; 2
3	(Mexico) (United States)	Marcello Lara / Raúl Ramírez; Dick Stockton / Erik van Dillen	6; 4	8; 6	3; 6	6; 3
4	(Mexico) (United States)	Marcello Lara; Brian Gottfried	6; 3	2; 6	6; 3	6; 8	1; 6
5	(Mexico) (United States)	Raúl Ramírez; Jimmy Connors	2; 6	6; 3	6; 3	6; 4

Argentina vs. Brazil

Argentina
5
Buenos Aires Lawn Tennis Club, Buenos Aires, Argentina
26–28 December 1975
Clay

Brazil
0

			1	2	3	4	5
1	(Argentina) (Brazil)	Ricardo Cano; Luis Felipe Tavares	6; 3	6; 4	7; 5
2	(Argentina) (Brazil)	Lito Álvarez; Carlos Kirmayr	6; 4	6; 1	6; 1
3	(Argentina) (Brazil)	Lito Álvarez / Ricardo Cano; Carlos Kirmayr / Luis Felipe Tavares	3; 6	6; 3	6; 4	6; 3
4	(Argentina) (Brazil)	Lito Álvarez; Luis Felipe Tavares	6; 3	6; 3	10; 8
5	(Argentina) (Brazil)	Enrique Caviglia; Luis Carlos Enck	6; 4	6; 4	6; 4

=== Semifinals ===
South Africa vs. Mexico

For the second year in succession, due to their opposition to the apartheid policies of the South African government, Mexico withdrew from their tie against South Africa. As a result Mexico defaulted the tie and South Africa were declared the winners by default.

Chile vs. Argentina

Chile
3
Santiago, Chile
5–7 March 1976
Clay

Argentina
2

			1	2	3	4	5
1	(Chile) (Argentina)	Jaime Fillol; Ricardo Cano	6; 8	6; 4	6; 1	6; 2
2	(Chile) (Argentina)	Patricio Cornejo; Guillermo Vilas	2; 6	8; 6	1; 6	6; 4	2; 6
3	(Chile) (Argentina)	Patricio Cornejo / Jaime Fillol; Ricardo Cano / Guillermo Vilas	4; 6	6; 4	7; 5	6; 4
4	(Chile) (Argentina)	Patricio Cornejo; Ricardo Cano	3; 6	6; 2	8; 6	7; 5
5	(Chile) (Argentina)	Jaime Fillol; Guillermo Vilas	3; 6	1; 6	2; 6

=== Final ===
Chile vs. South Africa

Chile
3
Santiago, Chile
26–28 April 1976

South Africa
2

			1	2	3	4	5
1	(Chile) (South Africa)	Patricio Cornejo; Bernard Mitton	4; 6	6; 3	5; 7	5; 7
2	(Chile) (South Africa)	Jaime Fillol; Raymond Moore	7; 5	8; 6	6; 3
3	(Chile) (South Africa)	Patricio Cornejo / Jaime Fillol; Byron Bertram / Frew McMillan	6; 3	10; 8	2; 6	4; 6	3; 6
4	(Chile) (South Africa)	Patricio Cornejo; Raymond Moore	5; 7	6; 2	10; 8	7; 5
5	(Chile) (South Africa)	Jaime Fillol; Bernard Mitton	7; 5	6; 3	4; 6	6; 2
