= 1973 Davis Cup Americas Zone =

International tennis competition

The Americas Zone was one of the three regional zones of the 1973 Davis Cup.

12 teams entered the Americas Zone split across two sub-zones, the North & Central America Zone and the South America Zone. 5 teams played in each of the sub-zone's preliminary rounds, with two teams progressing to each sub-zone's main draw to join the previous year's finalists the United States and Chile. The winners of each sub-zone main draw then played against each other to determine who moved to the Inter-Zonal Zone to compete against the winners of the Eastern Zone and Europe Zone.

The United States defeated Mexico in the North & Central America Zone final, and Chile defeated Argentina in the South America Zone final. In the Americas Inter-Zonal Final, the United States defeated Chile and progressed to the Inter-Zonal Zone.

== North & Central America Zone ==
=== Preliminary rounds ===
==== Draw ====
First Round; 23–25 February
Bogotá, Colombia (clay)
Colombia	4
Canada	1
bye
Caribbean/West Indies
Mexico
bye
bye
Venezuela

Qualifying Round; 9–11 March
Bogotá, Colombia
Colombia	3
Caribbean/West Indies	2
Mexico City, Mexico (clay)
Mexico	4
Venezuela	1

==== First round ====
Colombia vs. Canada

Colombia
4
Bogotá, Colombia
23–25 February 1973
Clay

Canada
1

			1	2	3	4	5
1	(Colombia) (Canada)	Iván Molina; Mike Belkin	9; 7					retired
2	(Colombia) (Canada)	Jairo Velasco; Tony Bardsley	5; 7	6; 1	6; 3	6; 1
3	(Colombia) (Canada)	Iván Molina / Jairo Velasco; Tony Bardsley / Donald McCormick	6; 3	6; 4	6; 3
4	(Colombia) (Canada)	Javier Restrepo; Tony Bardsley	6; 8	5; 7	1; 6
5	(Colombia) (Canada)	Jairo Velasco; Donald McCormick	6; 2	6; 3	7; 5

==== Qualifying round ====
Colombia vs. Caribbean/West Indies

Colombia
3
Bogotá, Colombia
9–11 March 1973

Caribbean/West Indies
2

			1	2	3	4	5
1	(Colombia) (Cricket West Indies)	Iván Molina; Richard Russell	6; 3	6; 1	6; 4
2	(Colombia) (Cricket West Indies)	Jairo Velasco; Leo Rolle	6; 1	6; 2	6; 1
3	(Colombia) (Cricket West Indies)	Iván Molina / Jairo Velasco; Alan Price / Michael Valdez	3; 6	4; 6	6; 1	6; 0	4; 6
4	(Colombia) (Cricket West Indies)	Jairo Velasco; Richard Russell	3; 6	6; 3	6; 3	4; 6	2; 6
5	(Colombia) (Cricket West Indies)	Iván Molina; Leo Rolle	6; 3	6; 1	6; 0

Mexico vs. Venezuela

Mexico
4
Estadio Rafael Osuna, Mexico City, Mexico
9–11 March 1973
Clay

Venezuela
1

			1	2	3	4	5
1	(Mexico) (Venezuela)	Raúl Ramírez; Jorge Andrew	6; 2	6; 4	6; 3
2	(Mexico) (Venezuela)	Vicente Zarazúa; Humphrey Hose	5; 7	3; 6	6; 3	1; 6
3	(Mexico) (Venezuela)	Raúl Ramírez / Vicente Zarazúa; Jorge Andrew / Humphrey Hose	6; 4	6; 2	6; 2
4	(Mexico) (Venezuela)	Raúl Ramírez; Humphrey Hose	6; 2	6; 4	7; 5
5	(Mexico) (Venezuela)	Vicente Zarazúa; Jorge Andrew	6; 4	6; 4	6; 3

=== Main Draw ===
==== Draw ====
Semifinals; 23–25 March
United States	4
bye
Mexico City, Mexico (clay)
Mexico	5
Colombia	0

Final; 11–13 May
Mexico City, Mexico (clay)
United States	4
Mexico	1

==== Semifinals ====
Mexico vs. Colombia

Mexico
5
Estadio Rafael Osuna, Mexico City, Mexico
23–25 March 1973
Clay

Colombia
0

			1	2	3	4	5
1	(Mexico) (Colombia)	Raúl Ramírez; Iván Molina	6; 3	6; 8	6; 4	6; 2
2	(Mexico) (Colombia)	Joaquín Loyo Mayo; Jairo Velasco	5; 7	6; 2	5; 7	6; 3	7; 5
3	(Mexico) (Colombia)	Raúl Ramírez / Vicente Zarazúa; Iván Molina / Jairo Velasco	6; 3	3; 6	8; 6	6; 3
4	(Mexico) (Colombia)	Joaquín Loyo Mayo; Iván Molina	2; 6	6; 4	6; 1	6; 3
5	(Mexico) (Colombia)	Raúl Ramírez; Jairo Velasco	6; 1	6; 3	6; 3

==== Final ====
Mexico vs. United States

Mexico
1
Estadio Rafael Osuna, Mexico City, Mexico
11–13 May 1973
Clay

United States
4

			1	2	3	4	5
1	(Mexico) (United States)	Raúl Ramírez; Tom Gorman	6; 4	6; 2	6; 3
2	(Mexico) (United States)	Joaquín Loyo Mayo; Harold Solomon	5; 7	4; 6	5; 7
3	(Mexico) (United States)	Raúl Ramírez / Vicente Zarazúa; Tom Gorman / Erik van Dillen	5; 7	14; 12	3; 6	4; 6
4	(Mexico) (United States)	Raúl Ramírez; Harold Solomon	6; 8	5; 7	5; 7
5	(Mexico) (United States)	Luis Baraldi; Dick Stockton	6; 2	1; 6	3; 6	6; 8

== South America Zone ==
=== Preliminary rounds ===
==== Draw ====
First Round; 23–25 February
Buenos Aires, Argentina (clay)
Argentina	5
Ecuador	0
bye
Brazil
Uruguay
bye
bye
South Africa

Qualifying Round; 2–4 March; 23–25 March
Buenos Aires, Argentina (clay)
Argentina	4
Brazil	1
Punta del Este, Uruguay
Uruguay	0
South Africa	5

==== First round ====
Argentina vs. Ecuador

Argentina
5
Buenos Aires Lawn Tennis Club, Buenos Aires, Argentina
23–25 February 1973
Clay

Ecuador
0

			1	2	3	4	5
1	(Argentina) (Ecuador)	Guillermo Vilas; Ricardo Ycaza	6; 2	6; 3	6; 2
2	(Argentina) (Ecuador)	Julián Ganzábal; Miguel Olvera	6; 4	8; 6	6; 2
3	(Argentina) (Ecuador)	Ricardo Cano / Guillermo Vilas; Miguel Olvera / Ricardo Ycaza	6; 4	6; 3	6; 4
4	(Argentina) (Ecuador)	Héctor Romani; Ricardo Ycaza	6; 1	6; 1	6; 2
5	(Argentina) (Ecuador)	Guillermo Vilas; Miguel Olvera	6; 3	6; 2	6; 0

==== Qualifying round ====
Argentina vs. Brazil

Argentina
4
Buenos Aires Lawn Tennis Club, Buenos Aires, Argentina
23–25 March 1973
Clay

Brazil
1

			1	2	3	4	5
1	(Argentina) (Brazil)	Julián Ganzábal; José Edison Mandarino	3; 6	8; 6	3; 6	4; 6
2	(Argentina) (Brazil)	Guillermo Vilas; Jorge Paulo Lemann	6; 2	6; 3	1; 6	6; 2
3	(Argentina) (Brazil)	Ricardo Cano / Guillermo Vilas; Carlos Kirmayr / Luis Felipe Tavares	4; 6	6; 4	6; 2	6; 1
4	(Argentina) (Brazil)	Julián Ganzábal; Jorge Paulo Lemann	10; 8	7; 5	6; 4
5	(Argentina) (Brazil)	Guillermo Vilas; Carlos Kirmayr	4; 6	7; 5	6; 0	6; 2

Uruguay vs. South Africa

Uruguay
0
Punta del Este, Uruguay
2–4 March 1973

South Africa
5

			1	2	3	4	5
1	(Uruguay) (South Africa)	Alberto Laborde; Frew McMillan	0; 6	2; 6	1; 6
2	(Uruguay) (South Africa)	Gustavo Stapf; Pat Cramer	0; 6	1; 6	6; 4	1; 6
3	(Uruguay) (South Africa)	José Luis Damiani / Mario Laborde; Pat Cramer / Frew McMillan	3; 6	2; 6	2; 6
4	(Uruguay) (South Africa)	Alberto Laborde; Pat Cramer	0; 6	1; 6	0; 6
5	(Uruguay) (South Africa)	Gustavo Stapf; Ray Moore	8; 10	0; 6	3; 6

=== Main Draw ===
==== Draw ====
Semifinals; 13–15 April
Chile	3
bye	2
Montevideo, Uruguay (clay)
Argentina	4
South Africa	1

Final; 4–6 May
Buenos Aires, Argentina (clay)
Chile	3
Argentina	2

==== Semifinals ====
Argentina vs. South Africa

Argentina
4
Montevideo, Uruguay
13–15 April 1973
Clay

South Africa
1

			1	2	3	4	5
1	(Argentina) (South Africa)	Julián Ganzábal; Pat Cramer	6; 2	6; 0	3; 6	6; 0
2	(Argentina) (South Africa)	Guillermo Vilas; Bernard Mitton	6; 1	6; 3	6; 4
3	(Argentina) (South Africa)	Ricardo Cano / Guillermo Vilas; Deon Joubert / Bernard Mitton	3; 6	6; 2	6; 1	6; 8	3; 6
4	(Argentina) (South Africa)	Guillermo Vilas; Deon Joubert	6; 2	6; 2	6; 1
5	(Argentina) (South Africa)	Julián Ganzábal; Bernard Mitton	6; 3	5; 7	2; 6	6; 2	6; 2

==== Final ====
Argentina vs. Chile

Argentina
2
Buenos Aires Lawn Tennis Club, Buenos Aires, Argentina
4–6 May 1973
Clay

Chile
3

			1	2	3	4	5
1	(Argentina) (Chile)	Guillermo Vilas; Jaime Fillol	6; 3	6; 3	6; 0
2	(Argentina) (Chile)	Julián Ganzábal; Patricio Cornejo	4; 6	2; 6	7; 5	4; 6
3	(Argentina) (Chile)	Ricardo Cano / Guillermo Vilas; Patricio Cornejo / Jaime Fillol	3; 6	6; 4	4; 6	6; 3	6; 4
4	(Argentina) (Chile)	Guillermo Vilas; Patricio Cornejo	13; 11	1; 6	7; 9	6; 3	1; 6
5	(Argentina) (Chile)	Julián Ganzábal; Jaime Fillol	3; 6	11; 9	7; 5	2; 6	1; 6

== Americas Inter-Zonal Final ==
United States vs. Chile

United States
4
Burns Park Tennis Club, North Little Rock, AR, United States
3–5 August 1973
Hard

Chile
0

			1	2	3	4	5
1	(United States) (Chile)	Tom Gorman; Jaime Fillol	17; 15	6; 4	4; 6	6; 3
2	(United States) (Chile)	Stan Smith; Patricio Cornejo	7; 9	6; 2	8; 6	6; 4
3	(United States) (Chile)	Stan Smith / Erik van Dillen; Patricio Cornejo / Jaime Fillol	7; 9	37; 39	8; 6	6; 1	6; 3
4	(United States) (Chile)	Tom Gorman; Patricio Cornejo	6; 3	6; 1	6; 1
5	(United States) (Chile)	Stan Smith; Jaime Fillol						not played

The doubles match between Smith/van Dillen and Cornejo/Fillol set the Davis Cup record for the most games in a doubles rubber (122). The second set, which went to 37-39, set the record for the most games played in a set (76).
