= 1974 Davis Cup Americas Zone =

International tennis competition

The Americas Zone was one of the three regional zones of the 1974 Davis Cup.

12 teams entered the Americas Zone split across two sub-zones, the North & Central America Zone and the South America Zone. 9 teams played in the preliminary rounds, competing to advance to the main draw and join the remaining 3 teams which advanced to the main draw directly. The winners of each sub-zone main draw then played against each other to determine who moved to the Inter-Zonal Zone to compete against the winners of the Eastern Zone and Europe Zone.

Colombia defeated the United States in the North & Central America Zone final, and South Africa defeated Chile in the South America Zone final. In the Americas Inter-Zonal Final, South Africa defeated Colombia and progressed to the Inter-Zonal Zone.

== North & Central America Zone ==
=== Preliminary rounds ===
==== Draw ====
First Round; 19–21 October 1973
Kingston, Jamaica (indoor hard)
Canada	3
Caribbean/West Indies	2
Mexico
bye
bye
Colombia
bye
Venezuela

Qualifying Round; 23–25 November 1973
Mexico City, Mexico (clay)
Canada	1
Mexico	4
Bogotá, Colombia
Colombia	3
Venezuela	2

==== First round ====
Caribbean/West Indies vs. Canada

Caribbean/West Indies
2
Kingston, Jamaica
19–21 October 1973
Hard (indoors)

Canada
3

			1	2	3	4	5
1	(Cricket West Indies) (Canada)	Leo Rolle; Tony Bardsley	1; 6	4; 6	5; 7
2	(Cricket West Indies) (Canada)	Richard Russell; Donald McCormick	8; 6	11; 9	4; 6	6; 0
3	(Cricket West Indies) (Canada)	David Pratt / Richard Russell; Tony Bardsley / Donald McCormick	4; 6	2; 6	5; 7
4	(Cricket West Indies) (Canada)	Leo Rolle; Donald McCormick	3; 6	3; 6	4; 6
5	(Cricket West Indies) (Canada)	Richard Russell; Tony Bardsley	6; 1	6; 4	6; 4

==== Qualifying round ====
Mexico vs. Canada

Mexico
4
Estadio Rafael Osuna, Mexico City, Mexico
23–25 November 1973
Clay

Canada
1

			1	2	3	4	5
1	(Mexico) (Canada)	Joaquín Loyo Mayo; Réjean Genois	6; 4	10; 8	3; 6	6; 2
2	(Mexico) (Canada)	Raúl Ramírez; Tony Bardsley	6; 1	6; 3	6; 2
3	(Mexico) (Canada)	Luis Baraldi / Raúl Ramírez; Tony Bardsley / Donald McCormick	6; 1	6; 3	4; 6	5; 7	7; 5
4	(Mexico) (Canada)	Joaquín Loyo Mayo; Donald McCormick	6; 1	6; 2	6; 1
5	(Mexico) (Canada)	Luis Baraldi; Réjean Genois	7; 9	4; 6	4; 6

Colombia vs. Venezuela

Colombia
3
Bogotá, Colombia
23–25 November 1973

Venezuela
2

			1	2	3	4	5
1	(Colombia) (Venezuela)	Jairo Velasco; Humphrey Hose	9; 7	7; 5	7; 5
2	(Colombia) (Venezuela)	Orlando Agudelo; Jorge Andrew	6; 4	6; 2	4; 6	8; 6
3	(Colombia) (Venezuela)	Jairo Velasco / Nunil Velasco; Jorge Andrew / Humphrey Hose	7; 5	6; 4	2; 6	4; 6	5; 7
4	(Colombia) (Venezuela)	Orlando Agudelo; Humphrey Hose	1; 6	5; 7	2; 6
5	(Colombia) (Venezuela)	Jairo Velasco; Jorge Andrew	6; 3	6; 1	6; 2

=== Main Draw ===
==== Draw ====
Semifinals; 7–9 December
United States
bye
Cali, Colombia
Mexico	1
Colombia	4

Final; 11–13 January
Bogotá, Colombia
United States	1
Colombia	4

==== Semifinals ====
Colombia vs. Mexico

Colombia
4
Cali, Colombia
7–9 December 1973

Mexico
1

			1	2	3	4	5
1	(Colombia) (Mexico)	Jairo Velasco; Joaquín Loyo Mayo	6; 3	6; 4	6; 3
2	(Colombia) (Mexico)	Iván Molina; Raúl Ramírez	6; 1	6; 1	7; 5
3	(Colombia) (Mexico)	Iván Molina / Jairo Velasco; Raúl Ramírez / Vicente Zarazúa	6; 2	8; 10	3; 6	4; 6
4	(Colombia) (Mexico)	Iván Molina; Joaquín Loyo Mayo	7; 5	1; 6	6; 3	6; 3
5	(Colombia) (Mexico)	Jairo Velasco; Luis Baraldi	7; 5	1; 6	6; 2	4; 6	6; 2

==== Final ====
Colombia vs. United States

Colombia
4
Club Los Lagartos, Bogotá, Colombia
11–13 January 1974

United States
1

			1	2	3	4	5
1	(Colombia) (United States)	Jairo Velasco; Harold Solomon	6; 1	3; 6	4; 6	6; 3	7; 5
2	(Colombia) (United States)	Iván Molina; Erik van Dillen	6; 4	7; 5	6; 2
3	(Colombia) (United States)	Iván Molina / Jairo Velasco; Charlie Pasarell / Erik van Dillen	4; 6	11; 13	4; 6
4	(Colombia) (United States)	Jairo Velasco; Erik van Dillen	6; 0	6; 4	5; 7	6; 3
5	(Colombia) (United States)	Iván Molina; Harold Solomon	6; 2	6; 1	6; 0

== South America Zone ==
=== Preliminary rounds ===
==== Draw ====
First Round
Guayaquil, Ecuador (clay)
Ecuador	5
Uruguay	0
Montevideo, Uruguay (clay)
Brazil	0
South Africa	5

Qualifying Round
Guayaquil, Ecuador (clay)
Ecuador	0
South Africa	5

==== First round ====
Ecuador vs. Uruguay

Ecuador
5
Guayaquil Tenis Club, Guayaquil, Ecuador
5–7 October 1973
Clay

Uruguay
0

			1	2	3	4	5
1	(Ecuador) (Uruguay)	Ricardo Ycaza; Gustavo Stapf	7; 9	11; 9	6; 1	4; 6	7; 5
2	(Ecuador) (Uruguay)	Miguel Olvera; José Luis Damiani	6; 2	6; 3	6; 0
3	(Ecuador) (Uruguay)	Miguel Olvera / Ricardo Ycaza; José Luis Damiani / Gustavo Stapf	6; 4	6; 4	6; 1
4	(Ecuador) (Uruguay)	Miguel Olvera; Gustavo Stapf	6; 0	6; 1	6; 1
5	(Ecuador) (Uruguay)	Ricardo Ycaza; José Luis Damiani	10; 8	6; 3	7; 5

Brazil vs. South Africa

Brazil
0
Montevideo, Uruguay
14–16 December 1973
Clay

South Africa
5

			1	2	3	4	5
1	(Brazil) (South Africa)	José Edison Mandarino; Cliff Drysdale	3; 6	0; 6	0; 6
2	(Brazil) (South Africa)	Thomaz Koch; Bob Hewitt	2; 6	1; 6	6; 3	3; 6
3	(Brazil) (South Africa)	Thomaz Koch / José Edison Mandarino; Bob Hewitt / Frew McMillan	0; 6	0; 6	1; 6
4	(Brazil) (South Africa)	Carlos Kirmayr; Cliff Drysdale	6; 2	4; 6	6; 2	4; 6	3; 6
5	(Brazil) (South Africa)	Roberto Vaz-Carvalhães; Bob Hewitt	0; 6	3; 6	3; 6

==== Qualifying round ====
Ecuador vs. South Africa

Ecuador
0
Guayaquil Tenis Club, Guayaquil, Ecuador
4–6 January 1974
Clay

South Africa
5

			1	2	3	4	5
1	(Ecuador) (South Africa)	Miguel Olvera; Bob Hewitt	4; 6	2; 6	4; 6
2	(Ecuador) (South Africa)	Enrique Andrade; Ray Moore	2; 6	2; 6	1; 6
3	(Ecuador) (South Africa)	Pancho Guzmán / Miguel Olvera; Bob Hewitt / Frew McMillan	3; 6	3; 6	2; 6
4	(Ecuador) (South Africa)	Miguel Olvera; Ray Moore	3; 6	2; 6	3; 6
5	(Ecuador) (South Africa)	Enrique Andrade; Bob Hewitt	0; 6	0; 6	0; 6

=== Main Draw ===
==== Draw ====
Semifinals
Bogotá, Colombia (clay)
Chile
bye
South Africa	w/o
Argentina (Note: The tie was scratched and South Africa advanced to the South America Zone Final after Argentina refused to travel to South Africa due to their government's opposition to South Africa's apartheid policies.)

Final; 8–10 March
Bogotá, Colombia (clay)
Chile	2
South Africa	3

==== Final ====
Chile vs. South Africa

Chile
2
Bogotá, Colombia
8–10 March 1974
Clay

South Africa
3

			1	2	3	4	5
1	(Chile) (South Africa)	Patricio Cornejo; Cliff Drysdale	6; 1	2; 6	2; 6	3; 6
2	(Chile) (South Africa)	Jaime Fillol; Bob Hewitt	2; 6	4; 6	4; 6
3	(Chile) (South Africa)	Patricio Cornejo / Jaime Fillol; Bob Hewitt / Frew McMillan	9; 7	6; 4	2; 6	4; 6	4; 6
4	(Chile) (South Africa)	Patricio Cornejo; Bob Hewitt	6; 2	6; 3	3; 6	6; 3
5	(Chile) (South Africa)	Jaime Fillol; Cliff Drysdale	4; 6	6; 4	7; 5	6; 0

== Americas Inter-Zonal Final ==
Colombia vs. South Africa

Colombia
2
Bogotá, Colombia
10–12 May 1974

South Africa
3

			1	2	3	4	5
1	(Colombia) (South Africa)	Iván Molina; Ray Moore	8; 6	3; 6	5; 7	4; 6
2	(Colombia) (South Africa)	Jairo Velasco; Bob Hewitt	1; 6	3; 6	2; 6
3	(Colombia) (South Africa)	Iván Molina / Jairo Velasco; Bob Hewitt / Frew McMillan	3; 6	0; 6	3; 6
4	(Colombia) (South Africa)	Jairo Velasco; Ray Moore	6; 2	4; 6	6; 3	7; 9	6; 2
5	(Colombia) (South Africa)	Álvaro Betancur; Byron Bertram	6; 2	4; 6	8; 6	8; 6
