= 1979 Davis Cup Americas Zone =

1979 Davis Cup regional tournament

The Americas Zone was one of the three regional zones of the 1979 Davis Cup.

13 teams entered the Americas Zone in total, with 6 teams entering the North & Central America Zone and 7 teams entering the South America Zone. The winner of each sub-zone advanced to the Americas Inter-Zonal Final, with the winner going on to compete in the Inter-Zonal Zone against the winners of the Eastern Zone and Europe Zone.

The United States defeated Colombia in the North & Central America Zone final, and Argentina defeated Chile in the South America Zone final. In the Americas Inter-Zonal Final the United States defeated Argentina and progressed to the Inter-Zonal Zone.

== North & Central America Zone ==
=== Preliminary rounds ===
==== Draw ====
First Round; 6–8 October 1978
Mexico
bye
bye
Canada
Colombia
bye
Nassau, Bahamas
Caribbean/West Indies | 2
Venezuela | 3

Qualifying Round; 27–29 October 1978
Mexico City, Mexico (clay)
Mexico | 3
Canada | 2
Bogotá, Colombia
Colombia | 4
Venezuela | 1

==== First round ====
Caribbean/West Indies vs. Venezuela

Caribbean/West Indies
2
Nassau, Bahamas
6–8 October 1978

Venezuela
3

| | | | 1 | 2 | 3 | 4 | 5 |
|---|---|---|---|---|---|---|---|---|
| 1 | (Cricket West Indies) (Venezuela) | Leo Rolle; Humphrey Hose | 3; 6 | 4; 6 | 0; 6 |
| 2 | (Cricket West Indies) (Venezuela) | John Antonas; Jorge Andrew | 6; 3 | 0; 6 | 4; 6 | 5; 0 | | retired |
| 3 | (Cricket West Indies) (Venezuela) | John Antonas / Leo Rolle; Jorge Andrew / Humphrey Hose | 2; 6 | 6; 3 | 2; 6 | 1; 6 |
| 4 | (Cricket West Indies) (Venezuela) | Leo Rolle; Jorge Andrew | 1; 6 | 1; 6 | 1; 6 |
| 5 | (Cricket West Indies) (Venezuela) | John Antonas; Abraham Sojo | 6; 3 | 3; 6 | 6; 1 | 6; 1 |

==== Qualifying round ====
Mexico vs. Canada

Mexico
3
Estadio Rafael Osuna, Mexico City, Mexico
27–29 October 1978
Clay

Canada
2

| | | | 1 | 2 | 3 | 4 | 5 |
|---|---|---|---|---|---|---|---|
| 1 | (Mexico) (Canada) | Marcello Lara; Réjean Genois | 7; 5 | 3; 6 | 9; 11 | 6; 2 | 6; 4 |
| 2 | (Mexico) (Canada) | Emilio Montaño; Greg Halder | 5; 7 | 7; 5 | 6; 4 | 10; 8 |
| 3 | (Mexico) (Canada) | Marcello Lara / Raúl Ramírez; Réjean Genois / Richard Legendre | 6; 4 | 6; 4 | 6; 4 |
| 4 | (Mexico) (Canada) | Enrique Haro; John Picken | 1; 6 | 4; 6 | 8; 6 | 4; 6 |
| 5 | (Mexico) (Canada) | Emilio Montaño; Réjean Genois | 6; 2 | 6; 8 | 3; 6 |

Colombia vs. Venezuela

Colombia
4
Bogotá, Colombia
27–29 October 1978

Venezuela
1

| | | | 1 | 2 | 3 | 4 | 5 |
|---|---|---|---|---|---|---|---|
| 1 | (Colombia) (Venezuela) | Jairo Velasco; Humphrey Hose | 6; 3 | 5; 7 | 5; 7 | 6; 4 | 6; 4 |
| 2 | (Colombia) (Venezuela) | Iván Molina; Jorge Andrew | 3; 6 | 6; 3 | 6; 2 | 7; 5 |
| 3 | (Colombia) (Venezuela) | Iván Molina / Jairo Velasco; Jorge Andrew / Humphrey Hose | 6; 4 | 8; 6 | 6; 8 | 6; 4 |
| 4 | (Colombia) (Venezuela) | Álvaro Betancur; Humphrey Hose | 6; 3 | 1; 6 | 5; 7 |
| 5 | (Colombia) (Venezuela) | Orlando Agudelo; Abraham Sojo | 6; 3 | 6; 3 |

=== Main draw ===
==== Draw ====
Semifinals; 8–10 December 1978
United States
bye
Mexico City, Mexico (clay)
Mexico | 2
Colombia | 3

Final; 16–18 March
Cleveland, OH, United States (indoor hard)
United States | 5
Colombia | 0

==== Semifinals ====
Mexico vs. Colombia

Mexico
2
Estadio Rafael Osuna, Mexico City, Mexico
8–10 December 1978
Clay

Colombia
3

| | | | 1 | 2 | 3 | 4 | 5 |
|---|---|---|---|---|---|---|---|
| 1 | (Mexico) (Colombia) | Roberto Chávez; Jairo Velasco | 2; 6 | 2; 6 | 6; 3 | 8; 6 | 6; 8 |
| 2 | (Mexico) (Colombia) | Raúl Ramírez; Iván Molina | 6; 8 | 6; 8 | 7; 5 | 3; 6 |
| 3 | (Mexico) (Colombia) | Marcello Lara / Raúl Ramírez; Iván Molina / Jairo Velasco | 3; 6 | 6; 3 | 6; 3 | 6; 2 |
| 4 | (Mexico) (Colombia) | Raúl Ramírez; Jairo Velasco | 6; 1 | 7; 5 | 6; 4 |
| 5 | (Mexico) (Colombia) | Roberto Chávez; Iván Molina | 2; 6 | 3; 6 | 2; 6 |

==== Final ====
United States vs. Colombia

United States
5
Cleveland Skating Club, Cleveland, OH, United States
16–18 March 1979
Hard (indoors)

Colombia
0

| | | | 1 | 2 | 3 | 4 | 5 |
|---|---|---|---|---|---|---|---|
| 1 | (United States) (Colombia) | John McEnroe; Álvaro Betancur | 6; 2 | 6; 1 | 6; 1 |
| 2 | (United States) (Colombia) | Dick Stockton; Iván Molina | 6; 2 | 6; 3 | 6; 4 |
| 3 | (United States) (Colombia) | Peter Fleming / John McEnroe; Orlando Agudelo / Iván Molina | 6; 4 | 6; 0 | 6; 4 |
| 4 | (United States) (Colombia) | Dick Stockton; Álvaro Betancur | 6; 1 | 6; 2 | 7; 5 |
| 5 | (United States) (Colombia) | John McEnroe; Iván Molina | 6; 4 | 6; 3 | 6; 2 |

== South America Zone ==
=== Preliminary rounds ===
==== Draw ====
First Round; 22 September–8 October 1978
Argentina
bye
Guayaquil, Ecuador (indoor carpet)
Ecuador | 4
Peru | 1
Cochabamba, Bolivia (clay)
Bolivia | 0
Brazil | 5
bye
Uruguay

Qualifying Round; 27 October–1 November 1978
Guayaquil, Ecuador (indoor carpet)
Argentina | 4
Ecuador | 1
Itu, Brazil
Brazil | 4
Uruguay | 0

==== First round ====
Ecuador vs. Peru

Ecuador
4
Coliseo Voltaire Paladines Polo, Guayaquil, Ecuador
22–24 September 1978
Carpet (indoors)

Peru
1

| | | | 1 | 2 | 3 | 4 | 5 |
|---|---|---|---|---|---|---|---|
| 1 | (Ecuador) (Peru) | Andrés Gómez; Alberto Franco | 6; 2 | 6; 2 | 8; 6 |
| 2 | (Ecuador) (Peru) | Ricardo Ycaza; Fernando Maynetto | 6; 4 | 4; 6 | 0; 6 | 6; 3 | 6; 4 |
| 3 | (Ecuador) (Peru) | Andrés Gómez / Ricardo Ycaza; Alberto Franco / Fernando Maynetto | 6; 4 | 6; 3 | 6; 1 |
| 4 | (Ecuador) (Peru) | Raúl Viver; Alberto Franco | 5; 7 | 6; 2 | 6; 2 | 6; 2 |
| 5 | (Ecuador) (Peru) | Andrés Gómez; Fernando Maynetto | 3; 6 | 4; 6 | 3; 6 |

Bolivia vs. Brazil

Bolivia
0
Club de Tenis Cochabamba, Cochabamba, Bolivia
6–8 October 1978
Clay

Brazil
5

| | | | 1 | 2 | 3 | 4 | 5 |
|---|---|---|---|---|---|---|---|
| 1 | (Bolivia) (Brazil) | Juan Carlos Alvarado; Carlos Kirmayr | 2; 6 | 3; 6 | 0; 6 |
| 2 | (Bolivia) (Brazil) | Mario Martínez; Cássio Motta | 4; 6 | 5; 7 | 3; 6 |
| 3 | (Bolivia) (Brazil) | Juan Carlos Alvarado / Mario Martínez; Ney Keller / Carlos Kirmayr | 3; 6 | 3; 6 | 4; 6 |
| 4 | (Bolivia) (Brazil) | Juan Carlos Alvarado; Cássio Motta | 4; 6 | 3; 6 | 0; 6 |
| 5 | (Bolivia) (Brazil) | Mario Martínez; João Soares | 3; 6 | 3; 6 | 6; 3 | 6; 0 | 4; 6 |

==== Qualifying round ====
Ecuador vs. Argentina

Ecuador
1
Coliseo Voltaire Paladines Polo, Guayaquil, Ecuador
27–29 October 1978
Carpet (indoors)

Argentina
4

| | | | 1 | 2 | 3 | 4 | 5 |
|---|---|---|---|---|---|---|---|
| 1 | (Ecuador) (Argentina) | Ricardo Ycaza; Ricardo Cano | 6; 3 | 7; 9 | 6; 4 | 4; 6 | 5; 7 |
| 2 | (Ecuador) (Argentina) | Andrés Gómez; José Luis Clerc | 1; 6 | 6; 3 | 6; 8 | 2; 6 |
| 3 | (Ecuador) (Argentina) | Andrés Gómez / Ricardo Ycaza; Lito Álvarez / José Luis Clerc | 5; 7 | 6; 4 | 5; 7 | 4; 6 |
| 4 | (Ecuador) (Argentina) | Ricardo Ycaza; José Luis Clerc | 6; 2 | 6; 3 |
| 5 | (Ecuador) (Argentina) | Raúl Viver; Fernando Dalla Fontana | 4; 6 | 10; 12 |

Brazil vs. Uruguay

Brazil
4
Itu, Brazil
November 1978

Uruguay
0

| | | | 1 | 2 | 3 | 4 | 5 |
|---|---|---|---|---|---|---|---|---|
| 1 | (Brazil) (Uruguay) | Carlos Kirmayr; Hugo Roverano | 6; 0 | 6; 2 | 6; 3 |
| 2 | (Brazil) (Uruguay) | Cássio Motta; José Luis Damiani | 3; 6 | 6; 4 | 0; 6 | 6; 3 | 6; 4 |
| 3 | (Brazil) (Uruguay) | Ney Keller / Carlos Kirmayr; José Luis Damiani / Hugo Roverano | 6; 2 | 11; 9 | 6; 3 |
| 4 | (Brazil) (Uruguay) | Cássio Motta; Alberto Laborde | 6; 2 | 7; 5 | 6; 1 |
| 5 | (Brazil) (Uruguay) | Carlos Kirmayr; José Luis Damiani | | | | | | not played |

=== Main draw ===
==== Draw ====
Semifinals; 8–10 December 1978
Buenos Aires, Argentina (clay)
Argentina | 5
Brazil | 0
bye
Chile

Final; 16–18 March
Buenos Aires, Argentina (clay)
Argentina | 3
Chile | 2

==== Semifinals ====
Argentina vs. Brazil

Argentina
5
Buenos Aires Lawn Tennis Club, Buenos Aires, Argentina
8–10 December 1978
Clay

Brazil
0

| | | | 1 | 2 | 3 | 4 | 5 |
|---|---|---|---|---|---|---|---|
| 1 | (Argentina) (Brazil) | Ricardo Cano; Carlos Kirmayr | 3; 6 | 6; 3 | 6; 2 | 6; 1 |
| 2 | (Argentina) (Brazil) | José Luis Clerc; Cássio Motta | 6; 1 | 6; 0 | 6; 0 |
| 3 | (Argentina) (Brazil) | Lito Álvarez / José Luis Clerc; Ney Keller / Cássio Motta | 6; 4 | 6; 1 | 6; 4 |
| 4 | (Argentina) (Brazil) | José Luis Clerc; João Soares | 6; 4 | 6; 4 | 6; 0 |
| 5 | (Argentina) (Brazil) | Ricardo Cano; Cássio Motta | 6; 4 | 6; 2 | 6; 0 |

==== Final ====
Argentina vs. Chile

Argentina
3
Buenos Aires Lawn Tennis Club, Buenos Aires, Argentina
16–18 March 1979
Clay

Chile
2

| | | | 1 | 2 | 3 | 4 | 5 |
|---|---|---|---|---|---|---|---|---|
| 1 | (Argentina) (Chile) | Guillermo Vilas; Jaime Fillol | 9; 7 | 6; 2 | 6; 2 |
| 2 | (Argentina) (Chile) | José Luis Clerc; Hans Gildemeister | 1; 6 | 6; 2 | 3; 6 | 5; 7 |
| 3 | (Argentina) (Chile) | José Luis Clerc / Guillermo Vilas; Patricio Cornejo / Belus Prajoux | 6; 2 | 6; 2 | 8; 6 |
| 4 | (Argentina) (Chile) | José Luis Clerc; Jaime Fillol | 6; 2 | 6; 1 | 6; 1 |
| 5 | (Argentina) (Chile) | Guillermo Vilas; Hans Gildemeister | 6; 2 | 1; 6 | 6; 1 | 5; 7 | 2; 1 | retired |

== Americas Inter-Zonal Final ==
United States vs. Argentina

United States
4
Racquet Club of Memphis, Memphis, TN, United States
14–16 September 1979
Carpet (indoors)

Argentina
1

| | | | 1 | 2 | 3 | 4 | 5 |
|---|---|---|---|---|---|---|---|---|
| 1 | (United States) (Argentina) | Vitas Gerulaitis; José Luis Clerc | 6; 1 | 7; 5 | 6; 1 |
| 2 | (United States) (Argentina) | John McEnroe; Guillermo Vilas | 6; 2 | 6; 3 | 6; 2 |
| 3 | (United States) (Argentina) | Bob Lutz / Stan Smith; José Luis Clerc / Guillermo Vilas | 2; 6 | 4; 6 | 11; 9 | 6; 4 | 6; 1 |
| 4 | (United States) (Argentina) | John McEnroe; José Luis Clerc | 6; 2 | 6; 3 |
| 5 | (United States) (Argentina) | Vitas Gerulaitis; Guillermo Vilas | 7; 9 | 3; 0 | | | | retired |
