= Humphrey Hose =

Venezuelan tennis player (born 1947)

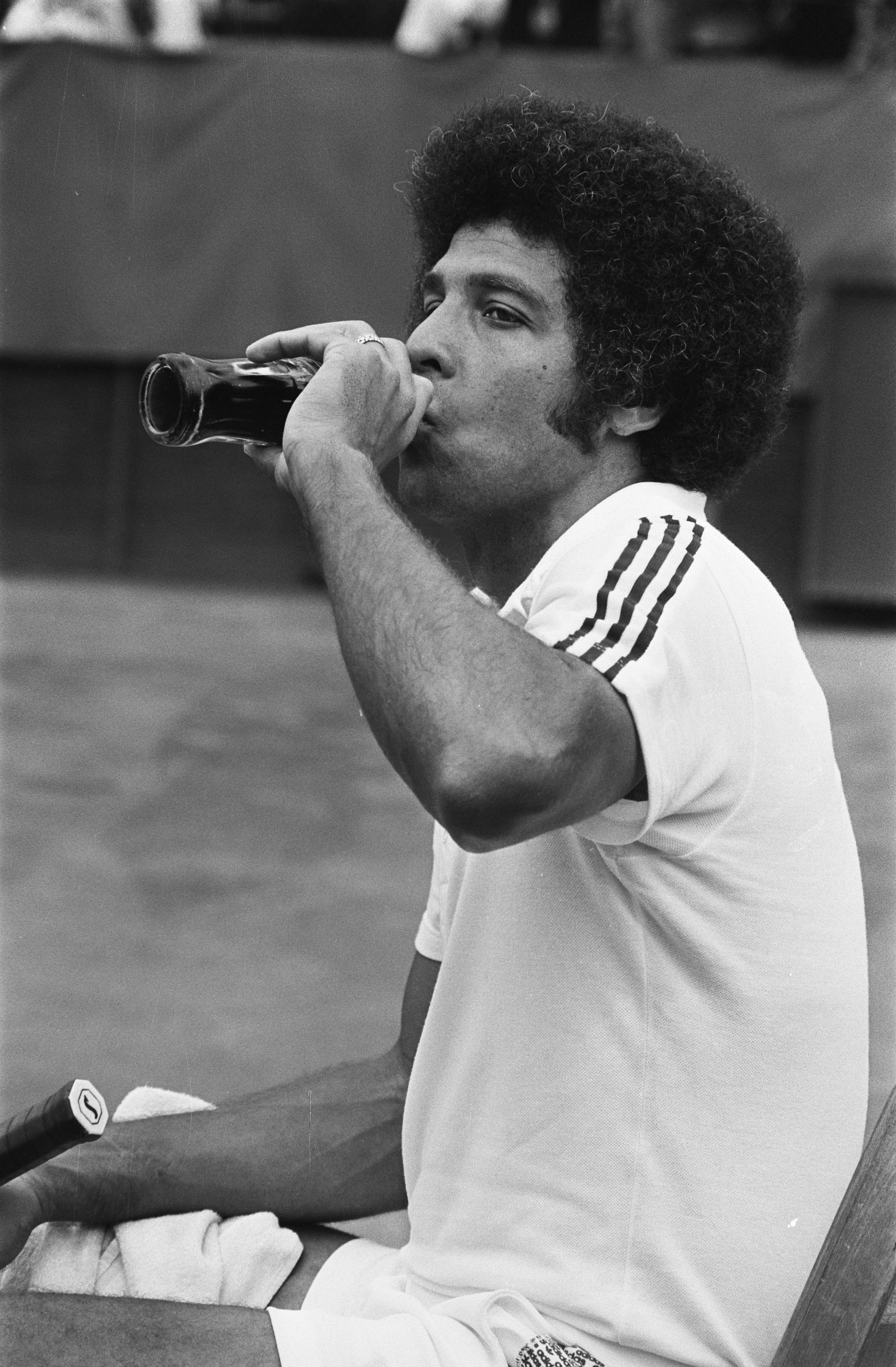
- Humphrey Hose (1975)
- Full name: Humphrey Hose
- Country (sports): Netherlands Antilles; Venezuela
- Born: 4 May 1947 (age 78) Willemstad, Curaçao
- Plays: Right-handed

Singles
- Career record: 11–30
- Career titles: 0
- Highest ranking: No. 125 (4 September 1974)

Grand Slam singles results
- French Open: 1R (1975)
- Wimbledon: 2R (1975)
- US Open: 2R (1967, 1972)

Doubles
- Career record: 12–25
- Career titles: 1

Grand Slam doubles results
- French Open: 2R (1975)
- Wimbledon: 1R (1975)
- US Open: 3R (1974)

Humphrey Hose (born 4 May 1947) is a former professional tennis player from Curaçao who represented Venezuela in the Davis Cup.

== Biography ==
Hose was born in Curaçao and became there the tennis champion at the age of 18. He moved to Venezuela in 1965 and began representing his adopted country in Davis Cup competition.

From 1967 to 1971, Hose played collegiate tennis in the United States with the University of Corpus Christi, earning NCAA All-American selection in his final year.

Following graduation, he competed on the Grand Prix tennis circuit. He won the doubles title at the Merion Open in 1974 with Roy Barth.

Hose played a total of 16 Davis Cup ties for Venezuela, the last in 1979. He finished with a 17/26 record, with 13 of those wins in singles, one of which was over American Dick Stockton in Caracas in 1976.

Since 1980, Hose has lived in Aruba, where he works as a tennis coach. He became captain of Aruba's Davis Cup team in 2007.

== Grand Prix career finals ==
=== Doubles: 2 (1–1) ===
Result	W/L	Date	Tournament	Surface	Partner	Opponent	Score
Loss	0–1	Aug 1972	Cincinnati, U.S.	Clay	(United States) Paul Gerken	(South Africa) Bob Hewitt (South Africa) Frew McMillan	6–7, 4–6
Win	1–1	Aug 1974	Merion, U.S.	Grass	(United States) Roy Barth	(United States) Mike Machette (United States) Fred McNair	7–6, 6–2

== Davis Cup ==
- ▲ ▼ indicates the outcome of the Davis Cup match followed by the score, date, place of event, the zonal classification and its phase, and the court surface.

Rubber outcome	Rubber	Match type (partner if any)	Opponent nation	Opponent player(s)	Score
▼2–3; 1–3 May 1966; Caracas, Venezuela; America Zone quarterfinals; hard surface
Defeat	I	Singles	Caribbean/West Indies	Richard Russell	6–4, 3–6, 7–5, 6–8, 0–6
Defeat	IV	Singles	Caribbean/West Indies	Lance Lumsden	4–6, 7–9, 6–1, 0–6
▼0–5; 30 April–2 May 1967; Buenos Aires LTC, Buenos Aires, Argentina; South America Zone semifinals; clay surface
Defeat	I	Singles	Argentina	Julián Ganzábal	1–6, 2–6, 2–6
Defeat	III	Doubles (with Julio Moros)	Argentina	Roberto Aubone Eduardo Soriano	1–6, 6–8, 5–7
Defeat	V	Singles (dead rubber)	Argentina	Eduardo Soriano	0–6, 6–8, 1–6
▲3–2; 27–29 April 1968; Caracas, Venezuela; South America Zone quarterfinals
Victory	I	Singles	Argentina	Tito Vázquez	4–6, 6–3, 8–6, 6–1
Defeat	III	Doubles (Julio Moros)	Argentina	Roberto Aubone Tito Vázquez	1–6, 4–6, 8–10
Victory	V	Singles	Argentina	Norberto Herrero	6–2, 6–2, 6–2
▼2–3; 3–5 May 1969; Caracas, Venezuela; South America Zone quarterfinals
Victory	II	Singles	Colombia	Jairo Velasco Sr.	6–2, 8–6, 8–6
Defeat	III	Doubles (with Jorge Andrew)	Colombia	William Álvarez Jairo Velasco Sr.	1–6, 6–4, 6–4, 3–6, 4–6
Defeat	IV	Singles	Colombia	William Álvarez	6–0, 6–2, 2–6, 4–6, 4–6
▼1–4; 22–24 March 1970; Caracas, Venezuela; South America Zone quarterfinals
Defeat	II	Singles	Brazil	Thomaz Koch	2–6, 8–6, 0–6, 6–1, 6–8
Defeat	III	Doubles (with Jorge Andrew)	Brazil	Thomaz Koch José Edison Mandarino	2–6, 7–9, 2–6
Victory	IV	Singles (dead rubber)	Brazil	Ricardo Bernd	6–4, 6–4, 6–3
▼1–4; 26–28 March 1971; Guayaquil TC, Guayaquil, Ecuador; South America Zone quarterfinals
Defeat	I	Singles	Ecuador	Miguel Olvera	2–6, 4–6, 3–6
Defeat	III	Doubles (with Jorge Andrew)	Ecuador	Pancho Guzmán Miguel Olvera	3–6, 4–6, 1–6
Victory	IV	Singles (dead rubber)	Ecuador	Pancho Guzmán	6–8, 6–4, 7–5, 6–4
▼0–4; 24–26 March 1972; Rio de Janeiro, Brazil; South America Zone quarterfinals
Defeat	I	Singles	Brazil	Thomaz Koch	3–6, 1–6, 6–2, 6–3, 4–6
Defeat	III	Doubles (with Carlos Suero)	Brazil	Thomaz Koch José Edison Mandarino	1–6, 3–6, 2–6
No result	V	Singles (dead rubber)	Brazil	Carlos Kirmayr	8–6, 0–2 abandoned
▼1–4; 9–11 March 1973; Est. Rafael Osuna, Mexico City, Mexico; North & Central America Zone qualifying round; clay surface
Victory	II	Singles	Mexico	Vicente Zarazúa	7–5, 6–3, 3–6, 6–1
Defeat	III	Doubles (with Jorge Andrew)	Mexico	Raúl Ramírez Vicente Zarazúa	4–6, 2–6, 2–6
Defeat	IV	Singles	Mexico	Raúl Ramírez	2–6, 4–6, 5–7
▼2–3; 23–25 November 1973; Bogotá, Colombia; North & Central America Zone Qualifying Round
Defeat	I	Singles	Colombia	Jairo Velasco Sr.	7–9, 5–7, 5–7
Victory	III	Doubles (with Jorge Andrew)	Colombia	Jairo Velasco Sr. Nunil Velasco	5–7, 4–6, 6–2, 6–4, 7–5
Victory	IV	Singles (dead rubber)	Colombia	Orlando Agudelo	6–1, 7–5, 6–2
▼0–5; 17–19 October 1975; Margaret Court Racquet Cl, Tucson, USA; Americas Zone qualifying round; hard surface
Defeat	I	Singles	United States	Jimmy Connors	4–6, 1–6, 3–6
Defeat	III	Doubles (with Jorge Andrew)	United States	Dick Stockton Erik van Dillen	2–6, 2–6, 5–7
Defeat	V	Singles (dead rubber)	United States	Roscoe Tanner	6–3, 3–6, 2–6, 4–6
▲4–0; 8–10 October 1976; Caracas, Venezuela; Americas Zone first round
Victory	I	Singles	Colombia	Javier Restrepo	6–2, 6–4, 6–4
Victory	III	Doubles (with Jorge Andrew)	Colombia	Orlando Agudelo Javier Restrepo	5–7, 9–7, 6–2, 6–3
No result	V	Singles (dead rubber)	Colombia	Orlando Agudelo	6–4, 5–7, 6–3, 1–1 abandoned
▼1–4; 12–14 November 1976; Altamira Tennis Club, Caracas, Venezuela; Americas Zone Qualifying Round
Defeat	II	Singles	United States	Vitas Gerulaitis	6–3, 4–6, 3–6, 4–6
Defeat	III	Doubles (with Jorge Andrew)	United States	Fred McNair Sherwood Stewart	6–8, 3–6, 4–6
Victory	IV	Singles (dead rubber)	United States	Dick Stockton	6–4, 3–6, 11–9, 9–7
▲3–2; 6–8 October 1978; Nassau, Bahamas; Americas Zone first round
Victory	I	Singles	Caribbean/West Indies	Leo Rolle	6–3, 6–4, 6–0
Victory	III	Doubles (with Jorge Andrew)	Caribbean/West Indies	John Antonas Leo Rolle	6–2, 3–6, 6–2, 6–1
▼1–4; 27–29 October 1978; Bogotá, Colombia; Americas Zone Qualifying Round
Defeat	I	Singles	Colombia	Jairo Velasco Sr.	3–6, 7–5, 7–5, 4–6, 4–6
Defeat	III	Doubles (with Jorge Andrew)	Colombia	Iván Molina Jairo Velasco Sr.	4–6, 6–8, 8–6, 4–6
Victory	IV	Singles (dead rubber)	Colombia	Álvaro Betancur	3–6, 6–1, 7–5
▲4–1; 27–29 October 1979; Caracas, Venezuela; Americas Zone Qualifying Round
Victory	II	Singles	Colombia	Iván Molina	7–5, 8–6, 5–7, 6–2
Victory	III	Doubles (with Jorge Andrew)	Colombia	Iván Molina Mauricio Posso	6–3, 6–4, 6–4
▼1–4; 7–9 December 1979; Est. Rafael Osuna, Mexico City, Mexico; Americas Zone semifinals; clay Surface
Defeat	I	Singles	Mexico	Marcello Lara	3–6, 6–3, 3–6, 6–8
Defeat	III	Doubles (with Jorge Andrew)	Mexico	Marcello Lara Raúl Ramírez	3–6, 3–6, 4–6
Victory	V	Singles (dead rubber)	Mexico	Javier Ordaz	6–3, 6–2
