= 1980 Davis Cup Americas Zone =

Regional zone in the 1980 Davis Cup

The Americas Zone was one of the three regional zones of the 1980 Davis Cup.

12 teams entered the Americas Zone in total, split across the North & Central America and the South America Zones. The winner of each sub-zone advanced to the Americas Inter-Zonal Final, with the winner going on to compete in the Inter-Zonal Zone against the winners of the Eastern Zone and Europe Zone.

The United States defeated Mexico in the North & Central America Zone final, and Argentina defeated Brazil in the South America Zone final. In the Americas Inter-Zonal Final Argentina defeated the United States and progressed to the Inter-Zonal Zone.

== North & Central America Zone ==
=== Preliminary rounds ===
==== Draw ====
First Round; 6–8 October 1979
Mexico
bye
Kingston, Jamaica (indoor hard)
Caribbean/West Indies	0
Canada	5
Venezuela
bye
bye
Colombia

Qualifying Round; 27–29 October 1979
Brantford, Canada (indoor hard)
Mexico	4
Canada	1
Caracas, Venezuela
Venezuela	4
Colombia	1

==== First round ====
Caribbean/West Indies vs. Canada

Caribbean/West Indies
0
Kingston, Jamaica
6–8 October 1979
Hard (indoors)

Canada
5

			1	2	3	4	5
1	(Cricket West Indies) (Canada)	John Antonas; Josef Brabenec	20; 18	6; 8	3; 6	4; 6
2	(Cricket West Indies) (Canada)	Gewan Maharaj; Dale Power	2; 6	2; 6	4; 6
3	(Cricket West Indies) (Canada)	John Antonas / Leo Rolle; Robert Bettauer / Dale Power	5; 7	2; 6	6; 4	5; 7
4	(Cricket West Indies) (Canada)	Stuart Sarnia; Josef Brabenec	5; 7	3; 6	1; 6
5	(Cricket West Indies) (Canada)	Leo Rolle; Robert Bettauer	1; 6	3; 6	6; 4	3; 6

==== Qualifying Draw ====
Canada vs. Mexico

Canada
1
Brantford, Canada
27–29 October 1979
Hard (indoors)

Mexico
4

			1	2	3	4	5
1	(Canada) (Mexico)	Dale Power; Emilio Montaño	6; 2	3; 6	6; 1	5; 7	6; 4
2	(Canada) (Mexico)	Robert Bettauer; Marcello Lara	2; 6	4; 6	4; 6
3	(Canada) (Mexico)	Josef Brabenec / Dale Power; Marcello Lara / Emilio Montaño	5; 7	4; 6	8; 10
4	(Canada) (Mexico)	Robert Bettauer; Emilio Montaño	5; 7	6; 3	3; 6	6; 2	6; 8
5	(Canada) (Mexico)	Dale Power; Marcello Lara	2; 6	2; 6

Venezuela vs. Colombia

Venezuela
4
Caracas, Venezuela
27–29 October 1979

Colombia
1

			1	2	3	4	5
1	(Venezuela) (Colombia)	Jorge Andrew; Alejandro Cortes	6; 2	6; 3	9; 7
2	(Venezuela) (Colombia)	Humphrey Hose; Iván Molina	7; 5	8; 6	5; 7	6; 2
3	(Venezuela) (Colombia)	Jorge Andrew / Humphrey Hose; Iván Molina / Mauricio Posso	6; 3	6; 4	6; 4
4	(Venezuela) (Colombia)	Fabio Mionbet; Alejandro Cortes	6; 2	7; 5
5	(Venezuela) (Colombia)	Carlos Claverie; Mauricio Posso	3; 6	6; 3	1; 6

=== Main draw ===
==== Draw ====
Semifinals; 7–9 December 1979
United States
bye
Mexico City, Mexico (clay)
Mexico	4
Venezuela	1

Final; 22–24 February
Mexico City, Mexico (clay)
United States	3
Mexico	2

==== Semifinals ====
Mexico vs. Venezuela

Mexico
4
Estadio Rafael Osuna, Mexico City, Mexico
7–9 December 1979
Clay

Venezuela
1

			1	2	3	4	5
1	(Mexico) (Venezuela)	Marcello Lara; Humphrey Hose	6; 3	3; 6	6; 3	8; 6
2	(Mexico) (Venezuela)	Raúl Ramírez; Jorge Andrew	6; 2	8; 6	6; 2
3	(Mexico) (Venezuela)	Marcello Lara / Raúl Ramírez; Jorge Andrew / Humphrey Hose	6; 3	6; 3	6; 4
4	(Mexico) (Venezuela)	Marcello Lara; Jorge Andrew	6; 4	3; 6	6; 2
5	(Mexico) (Venezuela)	Javier Ordaz; Humphrey Hose	3; 6	2; 6

==== Final ====
Mexico vs. United States

Mexico
2
Estadio Rafael Osuna, Mexico City, Mexico
22–24 February 1980
Clay

United States
3

			1	2	3	4	5
1	(Mexico) (United States)	Raúl Ramírez; John McEnroe	4; 6	4; 6	3; 6
2	(Mexico) (United States)	Marcello Lara; Vitas Gerulaitis	1; 6	2; 6	7; 5	2; 6
3	(Mexico) (United States)	Marcello Lara / Raúl Ramírez; Peter Fleming / John McEnroe	3; 6	3; 6	12; 10	6; 4	2; 6
4	(Mexico) (United States)	Raúl Ramírez; Vitas Gerulaitis	8; 6	6; 4
5	(Mexico) (United States)	Javier Ordaz; Scott Davis	7; 9	6; 4	6; 4

== South America Zone ==
=== Preliminary rounds ===
==== Draw ====
First Round; 6–8 October 1979
Chile
bye
Lima, Peru
Uruguay	4
Peru	0
Ecuador
bye
bye
Brazil

Qualifying Round; 27–29 October 1979
Montevideo, Uruguay
Chile	4
Uruguay	1
Guayaquil, Ecuador (clay)
Ecuador	2
Brazil	3

==== First round ====
Peru vs. Uruguay

Peru
0
Lima, Peru
6–8 October 1979

Uruguay
4

			1	2	3	4	5
1	(Peru) (Uruguay)	Pablo Arraya; Diego Pérez	5; 7	4; 6	7; 9
2	(Peru) (Uruguay)	Fernando Maynetto; José Luis Damiani	4; 6	7; 9	0; 6
3	(Peru) (Uruguay)	Fernando Maynetto / Jorge Salkeld; José Luis Damiani / Hugo Roverano	3; 6	5; 7	6; 3	7; 5	5; 7
4	(Peru) (Uruguay)	Pablo Arraya; José Luis Damiani	6; 3	3; 6	6; 8
5	(Peru) (Uruguay)	Fernando Maynetto; Diego Pérez						not played

==== Qualifying round ====
Uruguay vs. Chile

Uruguay
1
Montevideo, Uruguay
27–29 October 1979

Chile
4

			1	2	3	4	5
1	(Uruguay) (Chile)	Diego Pérez; Belus Prajoux	6; 4	2; 6	4; 6	4; 6
2	(Uruguay) (Chile)	José Luis Damiani; Hans Gildemeister	2; 6	3; 6	3; 6
3	(Uruguay) (Chile)	José Luis Damiani / Diego Pérez; Hans Gildemeister / Belus Prajoux	3; 6	6; 3	7; 5	6; 8	1; 6
4	(Uruguay) (Chile)	Diego Pérez; Hans Gildemeister	1; 6	1; 6
5	(Uruguay) (Chile)	José Luis Damiani; Belus Prajoux	6; 0	6; 4

Ecuador vs. Brazil

Ecuador
2
Club Nacional de Guayaquil, Guayaquil, Ecuador
27–29 October 1979
Clay

Brazil
3

			1	2	3	4	5
1	(Ecuador) (Brazil)	Ricardo Ycaza; Carlos Kirmayr	1; 6	3; 6	1; 6
2	(Ecuador) (Brazil)	Andrés Gómez; Cássio Motta	11; 9	2; 6	6; 4	3; 6	6; 3
3	(Ecuador) (Brazil)	Andrés Gómez / Raúl Viver; Carlos Kirmayr / Cássio Motta	6; 4	5; 7	11; 9	4; 6	4; 6
4	(Ecuador) (Brazil)	Raúl Viver; Cássio Motta	6; 4	4; 6	6; 4	6; 4
5	(Ecuador) (Brazil)	Andrés Gómez; Carlos Kirmayr	6; 1	8; 10	7; 9	4; 6

=== Main draw ===
==== Draw ====
Semifinals; 14–16 December 1979
São Paulo, Brazil
Chile	1
Brazil	3
bye
Argentina

Final; February 1980
São Paulo, Brazil (clay)
Brazil	1
Argentina	4

==== Semifinals ====
Brazil vs. Chile

Brazil
3
São Paulo, Brazil
14–16 December 1979

Chile
1

			1	2	3	4	5
1	(Brazil) (Chile)	Thomaz Koch; Jaime Fillol	7; 5	6; 3	1; 6	6; 3
2	(Brazil) (Chile)	Carlos Kirmayr; Hans Gildemeister	4; 6	2; 6	6; 2	1; 6
3	(Brazil) (Chile)	Carlos Kirmayr / Thomaz Koch; Jaime Fillol / Hans Gildemeister	3; 6	6; 3	7; 5	6; 0
4	(Brazil) (Chile)	Carlos Kirmayr; Ricardo Acuña	6; 3	6; 1	5; 7	7; 5
5	(Brazil) (Chile)	Thomaz Koch; Hans Gildemeister						not played

==== Final ====
Brazil vs. Argentina

Brazil
1
São Paulo, Brazil
February 1980
Clay

Argentina
4

			1	2	3	4	5
1	(Brazil) (Argentina)	Thomaz Koch; Guillermo Vilas	3; 6	6; 4	6; 4	2; 6	1; 6
2	(Brazil) (Argentina)	Carlos Kirmayr; José Luis Clerc	6; 4	6; 2	6; 8	3; 6	5; 7
3	(Brazil) (Argentina)	Carlos Kirmayr / Thomaz Koch; José Luis Clerc / Guillermo Vilas	6; 2	7; 9	12; 10	6; 3
4	(Brazil) (Argentina)	Carlos Kirmayr; Guillermo Vilas	6; 2	3; 6	8; 6	3; 6	3; 6
5	(Brazil) (Argentina)	Thomaz Koch; José Luis Clerc	2; 6	0; 6

== Americas Inter-Zonal Final ==
Argentina vs. United States

Argentina
4
Buenos Aires Lawn Tennis Club, Buenos Aires, Argentina
7–9 March 1980
Clay

United States
1

			1	2	3	4	5
1	(Argentina) (United States)	José Luis Clerc; John McEnroe	6; 3	6; 2	4; 6	13; 11
2	(Argentina) (United States)	Guillermo Vilas; Brian Gottfried	7; 5	6; 4	6; 3
3	(Argentina) (United States)	Ricardo Cano / Carlos Gattiker; Peter Fleming / John McEnroe	0; 6	1; 6	4; 6
4	(Argentina) (United States)	Guillermo Vilas; John McEnroe	6; 2	4; 6	6; 3	2; 6	6; 4
5	(Argentina) (United States)	José Luis Clerc; Brian Gottfried	7; 5	6; 4
