= 1972 Davis Cup Americas Zone =

International tennis competition

The Americas Zone was one of the three regional zones of the 1972 Davis Cup.

11 teams entered the Americas Zone: 4 teams competed in the North & Central America Zone, while 7 teams competed in the South America Zone. The winners of each sub-zone would play against each other to determine who moved to the Inter-Zonal Zone to compete against the winners of the Eastern Zone and Europe Zone.

The United States defeated Mexico in the North & Central America Zone final, and Chile defeated Brazil in the South America Zone final. In the Americas Inter-Zonal Final, the United States defeated Chile and progressed to the Inter-Zonal Zone.

== North & Central America Zone ==
=== Draw ===
Semifinals; 20–22 March; 12–14 May
Kingston, Jamaica (indoor carpet)
United States	4
Caribbean/West Indies	1
Vancouver, Canada (clay)
Canada	2
Mexico	3

Final; 16–18 June
Mexico City, Mexico (clay)
United States	5
Mexico	0

=== Semifinals ===
Caribbean/West Indies vs. United States

Caribbean/West Indies
1
National Arena, Kingston, Jamaica
20–22 March 1972
Carpet (indoors)

United States
4

			1	2	3	4	5
1	(Cricket West Indies) (United States)	Lance Lumsden; Erik van Dillen	1; 6	4; 6	2; 6
2	(Cricket West Indies) (United States)	Richard Russell; Tom Gorman	4; 6	2; 6	5; 7
3	(Cricket West Indies) (United States)	Lance Lumsden / Richard Russell; Stan Smith / Erik van Dillen	4; 6	2; 6	0; 6
4	(Cricket West Indies) (United States)	Richard Russell; Erik van Dillen	6; 2	7; 5	3; 6	3; 6	6; 3
5	(Cricket West Indies) (United States)	Compton Russell; Tom Gorman	1; 6	4; 6	3; 6

Canada vs. Mexico

Canada
2
Jericho Tennis Club, Vancouver, Canada
12–14 May 1972
Clay

Mexico
3

			1	2	3	4	5
1	(Canada) (Mexico)	Mike Belkin; Joaquín Loyo Mayo	6; 2	6; 0	3; 6	6; 8	7; 5
2	(Canada) (Mexico)	Tony Bardsley; Raúl Ramírez	4; 6	6; 8	2; 6
3	(Canada) (Mexico)	Mike Belkin / Dale Power; Joaquín Loyo Mayo / Vicente Zarazúa	4; 6	0; 6	6; 3	3; 6
4	(Canada) (Mexico)	Tony Bardsley; Joaquín Loyo Mayo	6; 8	4; 6	4; 6
5	(Canada) (Mexico)	Mike Belkin; Raúl Ramírez	7; 5	6; 4	6; 2

=== Final ===
Mexico vs. United States

Mexico
0
Estadio Rafael Osuna, Mexico City, Mexico
16–18 June 1972
Clay

United States
5

			1	2	3	4	5
1	(Mexico) (United States)	Joaquín Loyo Mayo; Tom Gorman	6; 8	3; 6	5; 7
2	(Mexico) (United States)	Vicente Zarazúa; Stan Smith	2; 6	1; 6	2; 6
3	(Mexico) (United States)	Joaquín Loyo Mayo / Vicente Zarazúa; Stan Smith / Erik van Dillen	19; 21	3; 6	4; 6
4	(Mexico) (United States)	Joaquín Loyo Mayo; Stan Smith	0; 6	3; 6	6; 2	4; 6
5	(Mexico) (United States)	Octavio Martínez; Harold Solomon	4; 6	1; 6	2; 6

== South America Zone ==
=== Draw ===
Quarterfinals; 20–26 March
Argentina
bye
Rio de Janeiro, Brazil
Brazil	4
Venezuela	0
Santiago, Chile
Chile	4
Peru	1
Guayaquil, Ecuador (clay)
Ecuador	1
Colombia	4

Semifinals; 8–10 April
Rio de Janeiro, Brazil (clay)
Argentina	2
Brazil	3
Santiago, Chile
Chile	4
Colombia	1

Final; 21–23 April
Rio de Janeiro, Brazil
Brazil	2
Chile	3

=== Quarterfinals ===
Brazil vs. Venezuela

Brazil
4
Rio de Janeiro, Brazil
24–26 March 1972

Venezuela
0

			1	2	3	4	5
1	(Brazil) (Venezuela)	Thomaz Koch; Humphrey Hose	6; 3	6; 1	2; 6	3; 6	6; 4
2	(Brazil) (Venezuela)	José Edison Mandarino; Jorge Andrew	6; 2	4; 0				retired
3	(Brazil) (Venezuela)	Thomaz Koch / José Edison Mandarino; Humphrey Hose / Carlos Suero	6; 1	6; 3	6; 2
4	(Brazil) (Venezuela)	Luis Felipe Tavares; Carlos Suero	6; 1	6; 1	6; 3
5	(Brazil) (Venezuela)	Carlos Kirmayr; Humphrey Hose	6; 8	2; 0				not completed

Chile vs. Peru

Chile
4
Santiago, Chile
20–23 March 1972

Peru
1

			1	2	3	4	5
1	(Chile) (Peru)	Jaime Pinto Bravo; Miguel Maurtúa	7; 5	6; 1	7; 5
2	(Chile) (Peru)	Patricio Rodríguez; Salomón Velasco	6; 2	6; 3	6; 1
3	(Chile) (Peru)	Jaime Pinto Bravo / Belus Prajoux; Miguel Maurtúa / Luis Alberto Olmedo	6; 1	6; 2	6; 0
4	(Chile) (Peru)	Belus Prajoux; Miguel Maurtúa	7; 5	6; 4	6; 1
5	(Chile) (Peru)	Francisco Musalem; Salomón Velasco	4; 6	2; 6	6; 2	6; 4	5; 7

Ecuador vs. Colombia

Ecuador
1
Guayaquil Tenis Club, Guayaquil, Ecuador
20–22 March 1972
Clay

Colombia
4

			1	2	3	4	5
1	(Ecuador) (Colombia)	Miguel Olvera; Jairo Velasco	6; 2	2; 6	6; 0	5; 7	6; 2
2	(Ecuador) (Colombia)	Pancho Guzmán; Iván Molina	3; 6	6; 3	5; 7	0; 6
3	(Ecuador) (Colombia)	Pancho Guzmán / Miguel Olvera; Iván Molina / Jairo Velasco	6; 2	3; 6	4; 6	4; 6
4	(Ecuador) (Colombia)	Pancho Guzmán; Jairo Velasco	6; 2	3; 6	4; 6	4; 6
5	(Ecuador) (Colombia)	Miguel Olvera; Iván Molina	6; 8	2; 6				retired

=== Semifinals ===
Brazil vs. Argentina

Brazil
3
Rio de Janeiro, Brazil
8–10 April 1972
Clay

Argentina
2

			1	2	3	4	5
1	(Brazil) (Argentina)	Thomaz Koch; Guillermo Vilas	4; 6	6; 3	10; 8	6; 3
2	(Brazil) (Argentina)	José Edison Mandarino; Julián Ganzábal	4; 6	6; 2	6; 3			retired
3	(Brazil) (Argentina)	Thomaz Koch / José Edison Mandarino; Ricardo Cano / Guillermo Vilas	6; 2	3; 6	8; 6	4; 6	4; 6
4	(Brazil) (Argentina)	Thomaz Koch; Héctor Romani	4; 6	6; 4	6; 3	1; 6	6; 1
5	(Brazil) (Argentina)	Luis Felipe Tavares; Guillermo Vilas	1; 6	0; 6	3; 6

Chile vs. Colombia

Chile
4
Santiago, Chile
8–10 April 1972

Colombia
1

			1	2	3	4	5
1	(Chile) (Colombia)	Jaime Pinto Bravo; Iván Molina	6; 4	6; 3	6; 3
2	(Chile) (Colombia)	Patricio Cornejo; Jairo Velasco	6; 3	6; 4	9; 7
3	(Chile) (Colombia)	Patricio Cornejo / Jaime Pinto Bravo; Iván Molina / Jairo Velasco	6; 2	7; 5	18; 20	5; 7	4; 6
4	(Chile) (Colombia)	Patricio Cornejo; Iván Molina	6; 3	6; 4	1; 6	6; 8	6; 4
5	(Chile) (Colombia)	Jaime Pinto Bravo; Jairo Velasco	2; 6	5; 7	9; 7			retired

=== Final ===
Brazil vs. Chile

Brazil
2
Rio de Janeiro, Brazil
21–23 April 1972

Chile
3

			1	2	3	4	5
1	(Brazil) (Chile)	José Edison Mandarino; Jaime Fillol	7; 5	6; 8	5; 7	1; 6
2	(Brazil) (Chile)	Thomaz Koch; Jaime Pinto Bravo	5; 7	1; 6	0; 6
3	(Brazil) (Chile)	Thomaz Koch / José Edison Mandarino; Patricio Cornejo / Jaime Fillol	6; 4	6; 1	6; 3
4	(Brazil) (Chile)	José Edison Mandarino; Jaime Pinto Bravo	3; 6	6; 2	2; 6	2; 6
5	(Brazil) (Chile)	Thomaz Koch; Jaime Fillol	6; 1	4; 6	6; 2	6; 3

== Americas Inter-Zonal Final ==
Chile vs. United States

Chile
0
Stade Français, Santiago, Chile
21–24 July 1972

United States
5

			1	2	3	4	5
1	(Chile) (United States)	Jaime Pinto Bravo; Stan Smith	1; 6	5; 7	2; 6
2	(Chile) (United States)	Patricio Cornejo; Harold Solomon	7; 9	6; 4	1; 6	6; 3	2; 6
3	(Chile) (United States)	Patricio Cornejo / Jaime Fillol; Stan Smith / Erik van Dillen	2; 6	4; 6	6; 4	6; 3	3; 6
4	(Chile) (United States)	Jaime Pinto Bravo; Harold Solomon	1; 6	1; 6	2; 6
5	(Chile) (United States)	Patricio Cornejo; Stan Smith	4; 6	6; 1	7; 9	1; 6
