= 1975 Nations Cup (tennis) =

International tennis competition

The 1975 ATP Nations Cup, sponsored by Reynolds Metals, was a men's team tennis tournament played on outdoor clay courts. It was the inaugural edition of the World Team Cup and took place in Kingston, Jamaica from 29 September through 5 October 1975. The tournament was played by the eight nations whose players were the highest ranked on the ATP ranking. Each team consisted of two or three players and the prize money for the event was $100,000.

The United States defeated Great Britain in the final to win the title an $35,000 first prize money.

== Players ==
Australia

- John Alexander
- Ross Case

Chile

- Patricio Cornejo
- Jaime Fillol
- Belus Prajoux

Commonwealth Caribbean

- John Antonas
- Richard Russell

United Kingdom

- Roger Taylor
- Buster Mottram

India

- Anand Amritraj
- Vijay Amritraj

Mexico

- Joaquín Loyo Mayo
- Raúl Ramírez

Germany

- Jürgen Fassbender
- Hans-Jürgen Pohmann

United States

- Arthur Ashe
- Roscoe Tanner

== First round ==
=== United States vs. Mexico ===
United States
2
Kingston, Jamaica
September 1975
Clay

Mexico
1

			1	2	3
1	(United States) (Mexico)	Roscoe Tanner; Joaquín Loyo Mayo	6; 2	6; 1
2	(United States) (Mexico)	Arthur Ashe; Raúl Ramírez	3; 6	6; 4	7; 6
3	(United States) (Mexico)	Arthur Ashe / Roscoe Tanner; Joaquín Loyo Mayo / Raúl Ramírez	6; 7	5; 7

=== Chile vs. West Germany ===
Chile
3
Kingston, Jamaica
September 1975
Clay

Germany
0

			1	2	3
1	(Chile) (Germany)	Belus Prajoux; Hans-Jürgen Pohmann	3; 6	7; 6	6; 4
2	(Chile) (Germany)	Jaime Fillol; Jürgen Fassbender	7; 5	4; 6	6; 2
3	(Chile) (Germany)	Jaime Fillol / Patricio Cornejo; Jürgen Fassbender / Hans-Jürgen Pohmann	6; 2	6; 4

=== India vs. Australia ===
India
2
Kingston, Jamaica
September 1975
Clay

Australia
1

			1	2	3
1	(India) (Australia)	Anand Amritraj; Ross Case	4; 6	1; 6
2	(India) (Australia)	Vijay Amritraj; John Alexander	2; 6	7; 6	7; 5
3	(India) (Australia)	Anand Amritraj / Vijay Amritraj; John Alexander / Ross Case	7; 6	6; 3

=== Great Britain vs. Commonwealth Caribbean (Jamaica) ===
Great Britain
3
Kingston, Jamaica
September 1975
Clay

Jamaica
0

			1	2	3
1	(United Kingdom) (Jamaica)	Roger Taylor; John Antonas	6; 2	6; 0
2	(United Kingdom) (Jamaica)	Buster Mottram; Richard Russell	6; 1	6; 3
3	(United Kingdom) (Jamaica)	Buster Mottram / Roger Taylor; John Antonas / Richard Russell	6; 1	6; 4

== Semifinal ==
=== United States vs. Chile ===
United States
3
Kingston, Jamaica
3 October 1975
Clay

Chile
0

			1	2	3
1	(United States) (Chile)	Roscoe Tanner; Belus Prajoux	6; 1	6; 1
2	(United States) (Chile)	Arthur Ashe; Jaime Fillol	6; 2	6; 2
3	(United States) (Chile)	Arthur Ashe / Roscoe Tanner; Patricio Cornejo / Jaime Fillol	3; 6	7; 5	6; 3

=== Great Britain vs. India ===
Great Britain
2
Kingston, Jamaica
4 October 1975
Clay

India
1

			1	2	3
1	(United Kingdom) (India)	Roger Taylor; Anand Amritraj	6; 4	6; 0
2	(United Kingdom) (India)	Buster Mottram; Vijay Amritraj	6; 4	6; 2
3	(United Kingdom) (India)	Buster Mottram / Roger Taylor; Anand Amritraj / Vijay Amritraj	4; 6	3; 6

== Final ==
=== United States vs. Great Britain ===
United States
2
Kingston, Jamaica
5 October 1975
Clay

Great Britain
1

			1	2	3
1	(United States) (United Kingdom)	Roscoe Tanner; Roger Taylor	6; 3	2; 6	6; 4
2	(United States) (United Kingdom)	Arthur Ashe; Buster Mottram	5; 7	7; 5	1; 6
3	(United States) (United Kingdom)	Arthur Ashe / Roscoe Tanner; Buster Mottram / Roger Taylor	6; 1	1; 6	6; 4

== See also ==
- 1975 Davis Cup
- 1975 Federation Cup
