= 1979 Davis Cup Eastern Zone =

International tennis competition

The Eastern Zone was one of the three regional zones of the 1979 Davis Cup.

10 teams entered the Eastern Zone, with 6 teams competing in the preliminary round to join the previous year's semifinalists in the main draw. Japan and India received byes into the quarterfinals, while Australia and New Zealand received byes into the semifinals. The winner of the main draw went on to compete in the Inter-Zonal Zone against the winners of the Americas Zone and Europe Zone.

Australia defeated New Zealand in the final and progressed to the Inter-Zonal Zone.

== Preliminary rounds ==
=== Draw ===
Pre-qualifying round 2–4 October 1978
Philippines
bye
Peshawar, Pakistan
Pakistan	3
South Korea	2
Chinese Taipei	w/o
Malaysia
bye
Indonesia

Preliminary round 3–5 November 1978
Philippines
Pakistan	w/o
Jakarta, Indonesia
Chinese Taipei	0
Indonesia	4

=== Pre-qualifying round ===
Pakistan vs. South Korea

Pakistan
3
Peshawar, Pakistan
2–4 October 1978

South Korea
2

			1	2	3	4	5
1	(Pakistan) (South Korea)	Saeed Meer; Kim Bong-suk	7; 5	9; 7	7; 9	4; 6	2; 6
2	(Pakistan) (South Korea)	Nadir Ali Khan; Ju Chang-nam	6; 3	6; 8	10; 8	6; 4
3	(Pakistan) (South Korea)	Jamil Ahmed / Nadir Ali Khan; Ju Chang-nam / Kim Bong-suk	6; 1	6; 8	3; 6	1; 6
4	(Pakistan) (South Korea)	Saeed Meer; Ju Chang-nam	6; 0	6; 1	6; 2
5	(Pakistan) (South Korea)	Nadir Ali Khan; Kim Bong-suk	6; 3	6; 4	9; 7

=== Preliminary round ===
Indonesia vs. Chinese Taipei

Indonesia
4
Jakarta, Indonesia
3–5 November 1978

Chinese Taipei
0

			1	2	3	4	5
1	(Indonesia) (Chinese Taipei)	Yustedjo Tarik; Hsu Huang-jung	6; 4	6; 2	6; 4
2	(Indonesia) (Chinese Taipei)	Atet Wijono; Wu Chang-rung	6; 3	6; 1	6; 1
3	(Indonesia) (Chinese Taipei)	Gondo Widjojo / Atet Wijono; Hsu Huang-jung / Wu Chang-rung	6; 2	9; 7	6; 1
4	(Indonesia) (Chinese Taipei)	Yustedjo Tarik; Wu Chang-rung	6; 2	6; 2	3; 6	6; 0
5	(Indonesia) (Chinese Taipei)	Hadiman; Hsu Huang-jung	4; 6	7; 5	4; 6	5; 4		not completed

== Main Draw ==
=== Draw ===
Quarterfinals; 5–10 December 1978
New Zealand
bye
Kasuga, Japan
Japan	4
Pakistan	1
Ahmedabad, India
Indonesia	1
India	4
bye
Australia

Semifinals; 9–12 February
Christchurch, New Zealand (grass)
New Zealand	3
Japan	0
Madras, India (clay)
India	2
Australia	3

Final; 16–19 March
Christchurch, New Zealand (grass)
New Zealand	2
Australia	3

=== Quarterfinals ===
Japan vs. Pakistan

Japan
4
Kasuga, Japan
8–10 December 1978

Pakistan
1

			1	2	3	4	5
1	(Japan) (Pakistan)	Jun Kuki; Meer Mohammed Khan	6; 2	6; 2	6; 1
2	(Japan) (Pakistan)	Jun Kamiwazumi; Saeed Meer	4; 6	6; 3	5; 7	7; 9
3	(Japan) (Pakistan)	Kenichi Hirai / Jun Kamiwazumi; Saeed Meer / Meer Mohammed Khan	6; 0	6; 2	6; 2
4	(Japan) (Pakistan)	Jun Kuki; Saeed Meer	6; 2	6; 4	6; 4
5	(Japan) (Pakistan)	Kenichi Hirai; Meer Mohammed Khan	6; 2	6; 2	6; 4

India vs. Indonesia

India
4
Ahmedabad, India
5–7 December 1978

Indonesia
1

			1	2	3	4	5
1	(India) (Indonesia)	Sashi Menon; Atet Wijono	7; 5	6; 0	6; 4
2	(India) (Indonesia)	Anand Amritraj; Yustedjo Tarik	6; 4	6; 2	6; 4
3	(India) (Indonesia)	Anand Amritraj / Sashi Menon; Gondo Widjojo / Atet Wijono	6; 1	10; 8	6; 2
4	(India) (Indonesia)	Anand Amritraj; Atet Wijono						w/o
5	(India) (Indonesia)	Sashi Menon; Yustedjo Tarik	7; 5	4; 6	6; 2	6; 4

=== Semifinals ===
New Zealand vs. Japan

New Zealand
3
Wilding Park, Christchurch, New Zealand
9–11 February 1979
Grass

Japan
0

			1	2	3	4	5
1	(New Zealand) (Japan)	Russell Simpson; Jun Kamiwazumi	6; 4	6; 4	6; 4
2	(New Zealand) (Japan)	Onny Parun; Kenichi Hirai	6; 3	12; 14	10; 8	6; 3
3	(New Zealand) (Japan)	Brian Fairlie / Russell Simpson; Kenichi Hirai / Jun Kamiwazumi	6; 4	4; 6	6; 4	6; 4
4	(New Zealand) (Japan)	Russell Simpson; Kenichi Hirai						not played
5	(New Zealand) (Japan)	Onny Parun; Jun Kamiwazumi						not played

India vs. Australia

India
2
Madras Gymkhana Club, Madras, India
9–12 February 1979
Clay

Australia
3

			1	2	3	4	5
1	(India) (Australia)	Sashi Menon; Ross Case	7; 9	1; 6	2; 6
2	(India) (Australia)	Vijay Amritraj; John Alexander	4; 6	6; 8	6; 1	3; 6
3	(India) (Australia)	Anand Amritraj / Vijay Amritraj; Ross Case / Geoff Masters	6; 8	6; 4	6; 1	6; 3
4	(India) (Australia)	Vijay Amritraj; Ross Case	7; 5	6; 1	7; 5
5	(India) (Australia)	Sashi Menon; John Alexander	8; 6	6; 3	3; 6	3; 6	4; 6

=== Final ===
New Zealand vs. Australia

New Zealand
2
Wilding Park, Christchurch, New Zealand
16–19 March 1979
Grass

Australia
3

			1	2	3	4	5
1	(New Zealand) (Australia)	Onny Parun; Mark Edmondson	3; 6	6; 3	6; 3	6; 2
2	(New Zealand) (Australia)	Russell Simpson; John Alexander	4; 6	6; 4	5; 7	4; 6
3	(New Zealand) (Australia)	Onny Parun / Russell Simpson; John Alexander / Phil Dent	4; 6	7; 9	3; 6
4	(New Zealand) (Australia)	Russell Simpson; Mark Edmondson	3; 6	2; 6	4; 6
5	(New Zealand) (Australia)	Onny Parun; John Alexander	7; 5	6; 3	6; 3
