= 1974 Davis Cup =

1974 edition of the Davis Cup

Details
- Duration: 5 October 1973 – 1 December 1974
- Edition: 63rd
- Teams: 55

Champion
- Winning nation: South Africa

The 1974 Davis Cup was the 63rd edition of the Davis Cup, the most important tournament between national teams in men's tennis. 57 teams would enter the competition, 33 in the Europe Zone, 12 in the Americas Zone, and 12 in the Eastern Zone. Nigeria made its first appearance in the tournament.

South Africa defeated Colombia in the Americas Inter-Zonal final, India defeated Australia in the Eastern Zone final, and Italy and the Soviet Union were the winners of the two Europe Zones, defeating Romania and Czechoslovakia respectively. In the Inter-Zonal Zone, South Africa defeated Italy and India defeated the Soviet Union in the semifinals.

India refused to travel to South Africa for the final due to their government's opposition to South Africa's apartheid policies: therefore, the final was scratched and South Africa were awarded the Davis Cup. South Africa became only the fifth nation to win the Davis Cup, breaking the dominance of the United States, Great Britain, France and Australia teams which had won every tournament before this year.

== Americas Zone ==
=== North & Central America Zone ===
==== Preliminary rounds ====
First Round
Kingston, Jamaica (indoor hard)
Canada | 3
Caribbean/West Indies | 2
Mexico
bye
bye
Colombia
bye
Venezuela

Qualifying Round
Mexico City, Mexico (clay)
Canada | 1
Mexico | 4
Bogotá, Colombia
Colombia | 3
Venezuela | 2

==== Main Draw ====
Semifinals; 7–9 December
United States
bye
Cali, Colombia
Mexico | 1
Colombia | 4

Final; 11–13 January
Bogotá, Colombia
United States | 1
Colombia | 4

=== South America Zone ===
==== Preliminary rounds ====
First Round
Guayaquil, Ecuador (clay)
Ecuador | 5
Uruguay | 0
Montevideo, Uruguay (clay)
Brazil | 0
South Africa | 5

Qualifying Round
Guayaquil, Ecuador (clay)
Ecuador | 0
South Africa | 5

==== Main Draw ====
Semifinals
Bogotá, Colombia (clay)
Chile
bye
South Africa | w/o (Note: The tie between South Africa and Argentina was scratched and South Africa advanced to the South America Zone Final after Argentina refused to travel to South Africa due to their government's opposition to South Africa's apartheid policies.)
Argentina

Final; 8–10 March
Bogotá, Colombia (clay)
Chile | 2
South Africa | 3

=== Americas Inter-Zonal Final ===
Colombia vs. South Africa

Colombia
2
Bogotá, Colombia
10–12 May 1974

South Africa
3

| | | | 1 | 2 | 3 | 4 | 5 |
|---|---|---|---|---|---|---|---|
| 1 | (Colombia) (South Africa) | Iván Molina; Ray Moore | 8; 6 | 3; 6 | 5; 7 | 4; 6 |
| 2 | (Colombia) (South Africa) | Jairo Velasco; Bob Hewitt | 1; 6 | 3; 6 | 2; 6 |
| 3 | (Colombia) (South Africa) | Iván Molina / Jairo Velasco; Bob Hewitt / Frew McMillan | 3; 6 | 0; 6 | 3; 6 |
| 4 | (Colombia) (South Africa) | Jairo Velasco; Ray Moore | 6; 2 | 4; 6 | 6; 3 | 7; 9 | 6; 2 |
| 5 | (Colombia) (South Africa) | Álvaro Betancur; Byron Bertram | 6; 2 | 4; 6 | 8; 6 | 8; 6 |

== Eastern Zone ==
=== Preliminary rounds ===
First Round
Pakistan
bye
Malaysia
bye
Manila, Philippines
Philippines | 3
Indonesia | 1
Hong Kong
bye
bye
South Vietnam
Tokyo, Japan
Japan | 3
South Korea | 0
bye
Chinese Taipei
bye
Sri Lanka

Qualifying Round
Karachi, Pakistan
Pakistan | 4
Malaysia | 1
Manila, Philippines
Philippines | 5
Hong Kong | 0
Tokyo, Japan
South Vietnam | 0
Japan | 3
Chinese Taipei | w/o
Sri Lanka

=== Main Draw ===
Quarterfinals; 26–28 April
Rawalpindi, Pakistan
Australia
bye
Lahore, Pakistan
Pakistan | 4
Philippines | 1
Taipei, Taiwan (hard)
Chinese Taipei | 0
Japan | 3
bye
India

Semifinals; 3–5 May
Rawalpindi, Pakistan
Australia | 3
Pakistan | 0
Kanpur, India
Japan | 1
India | 4

Final; 10–12 May
Calcutta, India
Australia | 2
India | 3

=== Final ===
India vs. Australia

India
3
Calcutta, India
10–12 May 1974

Australia
2

| | | | 1 | 2 | 3 | 4 | 5 |
|---|---|---|---|---|---|---|---|
| 1 | (India) (Australia) | Jasjit Singh; Bob Giltinan | 11; 9 | 9; 11 | 12; 10 | 8; 6 |
| 2 | (India) (Australia) | Vijay Amritraj; John Alexander | 12; 14 | 15; 17 | 8; 6 | 2; 6 |
| 3 | (India) (Australia) | Anand Amritraj / Vijay Amritraj; John Alexander / Colin Dibley | 17; 15 | 6; 8 | 6; 3 | 16; 18 | 6; 4 |
| 4 | (India) (Australia) | Jasjit Singh; John Alexander | 6; 8 | 4; 6 | 3; 6 |
| 5 | (India) (Australia) | Vijay Amritraj; Bob Giltinan | 6; 1 | 5; 7 | 6; 4 | 6; 4 |

The Eastern Zone Final set the Davis Cup record for the most games in a tie (327).

== Europe Zone ==
=== Zone A ===
==== Pre-qualifying rounds ====
First Round
Istanbul, Turkey (indoor clay)
Turkey | 3
Lebanon | 2
bye
Luxembourg

Qualifying Round
Istanbul, Turkey
Turkey | 5
Luxembourg | 0

==== Preliminary rounds ====
First Round
New Zealand
bye
Zürich, Switzerland
Switzerland | 2
Austria | 3
France
bye
Lisbon, Portugal (clay)
Portugal | 4
Ireland | 1
Warsaw, Poland
Poland | 3
Hungary | 2
bye
Sweden
Helsinki, Finland
Finland | 5
Turkey | 0
bye
Netherlands

Qualifying Round
Vienna, Austria
New Zealand | 1
Austria | 3
Porto, Portugal (clay)
France | 5
Portugal | 0
Båstad, Sweden (clay)
Poland | 1
Sweden | 4
Scheveningen, Netherlands (clay)
Finland | 1
Netherlands | 4

==== Main Draw ====
Quarterfinals; 10–12 May; 24–26 May
Romania
bye
Vienna, Austria
Austria | 1
France | 3
Båstad, Sweden (clay)
Sweden | 4
Netherlands | 1
bye
Italy

Semifinals; 19–21 July
Bucharest, Romania (clay)
Romania | 3
France | 2
Båstad, Sweden (clay)
Sweden | 2
Italy | 3

Final; 2–4 August
Mestre, Italy (clay)
Romania | 2
Italy | 3

==== Final ====
Italy vs. Romania

Italy
3
Mestre, Italy
2–4 August 1974
Clay

Romania
2

| | | | 1 | 2 | 3 | 4 | 5 |
|---|---|---|---|---|---|---|---|
| 1 | (Italy) (Romania) | Corrado Barazzutti; Ilie Năstase | 7; 9 | 0; 6 | 1; 6 |
| 2 | (Italy) (Romania) | Adriano Panatta; Ion Țiriac | 6; 1 | 6; 3 | 6; 2 |
| 3 | (Italy) (Romania) | Paolo Bertolucci / Adriano Panatta; Ilie Năstase / Ion Țiriac | 6; 4 | 8; 6 | 6; 8 | 4; 6 | 6; 2 |
| 4 | (Italy) (Romania) | Corrado Barazzutti; Ion Țiriac | 6; 3 | 6; 0 | 6; 0 |
| 5 | (Italy) (Romania) | Adriano Panatta; Ilie Năstase | 0; 6 | 0; 6 | 5; 7 |

=== Zone B ===
==== Pre-qualifying rounds ====
First Round
Egypt
bye
Lagos, Nigeria
Nigeria | 2
Morocco | 3
bye
Iran
bye
Israel

Qualifying Round
Cairo, Egypt
Egypt | 3
Morocco | 0
Tehran, Iran
Iran | 4
Israel | 1

==== Preliminary rounds ====
First Round
West Germany
bye
Monte Carlo, Monaco (clay)
Monaco | 2
Denmark | 3
Spain
bye
Oslo, Norway (indoor hard)
Norway | 4
Iran | 1
Cairo, Egypt
Egypt | 3
Bulgaria | 1
bye
Great Britain
Brussels, Belgium
Belgium | 5
Greece | 0
bye
Yugoslavia

Qualifying Round
West Berlin (clay)
West Germany | 5
Denmark | 0
Barcelona, Spain (clay)
Spain | 5
Norway | 0
Cairo, Egypt (clay)
Egypt | 5
Great Britain | 0
Brussels, Belgium
Belgium | 2
Yugoslavia | 3

==== Main Draw ====
Quarterfinals; 10–12 May
Czechoslovakia
bye
Düsseldorf, West Germany
West Germany | 3
Spain | 2
Cairo, Egypt
Egypt | 2
Yugoslavia | 3
bye
Soviet Union

Semifinals; 19–21 July
Munich, West Germany (clay)
Czechoslovakia | 3
West Germany | 2
Donetsk, Soviet Union
Yugoslavia | 1
Soviet Union | 3

Final; 26–28 July
Donetsk, Soviet Union (clay)
Czechoslovakia | 2
Soviet Union | 3

==== Final ====
Soviet Union vs. Czechoslovakia

Soviet Union
3
Donetsk, Soviet Union
26–28 July 1974
Clay

Czechoslovakia
2

| | | | 1 | 2 | 3 | 4 | 5 |
|---|---|---|---|---|---|---|---|
| 1 | (Soviet Union) (Czechoslovakia) | Alex Metreveli; František Pála | 6; 2 | 6; 4 | 3; 6 | 6; 2 |
| 2 | (Soviet Union) (Czechoslovakia) | Teimuraz Kakulia; Jan Kodeš | 4; 6 | 2; 6 | 3; 6 |
| 3 | (Soviet Union) (Czechoslovakia) | Vladimir Korotkov / Alex Metreveli; Jan Kodeš / Vladimír Zedník | 4; 6 | 1; 6 | 3; 6 |
| 4 | (Soviet Union) (Czechoslovakia) | Alex Metreveli; Jan Kodeš | 4; 6 | 6; 3 | 4; 6 | 6; 3 | 7; 5 |
| 5 | (Soviet Union) (Czechoslovakia) | Teimuraz Kakulia; František Pála | 6; 3 | 4; 6 | 6; 4 | 2; 6 | 6; 4 |

== Inter-Zonal Zone ==
=== Draw ===
Semifinals; 20 September–5 October
Poona, India
EUR-B | Soviet Union | 1
EAS | India | 3
Johannesburg, South Africa
AME | South Africa | 4
EUR-A | Italy | 1

Final
EAS | India
AME | South Africa | w/o

=== Semifinals ===
India vs. Soviet Union

India
3
Poona, India
20–22 September 1974

Soviet Union
1

| | | | 1 | 2 | 3 | 4 | 5 |
|---|---|---|---|---|---|---|---|---|
| 1 | (India) (Soviet Union) | Vijay Amritraj; Teimuraz Kakulia | 6; 4 | 11; 9 | 6; 3 |
| 2 | (India) (Soviet Union) | Anand Amritraj; Alex Metreveli | 4; 6 | 7; 9 | 3; 6 |
| 3 | (India) (Soviet Union) | Anand Amritraj / Vijay Amritraj; Vladimir Korotkov / Alex Metreveli | 13; 15 | 7; 5 | 19; 17 | 6; 3 |
| 4 | (India) (Soviet Union) | Anand Amritraj; Teimuraz Kakulia | 6; 2 | 8; 10 | 4; 6 | 6; 3 | 6; 3 |
| 5 | (India) (Soviet Union) | Vijay Amritraj; Alex Metreveli | | | | | | not played |

South Africa vs. Italy

South Africa
4
Ellis Park, Johannesburg, South Africa
3–5 October 1974 (Note: The South Africa vs. Italy tie was originally scheduled to be played from 22 September, but was postponed due to disagreements over the venue: Italy originally refused to travel to South Africa, while South Africa rejected Italy's request to play the match in Rome. The match eventually went ahead in South Africa on 3 October.)

Italy
1

| | | | 1 | 2 | 3 | 4 | 5 |
|---|---|---|---|---|---|---|---|
| 1 | (South Africa) (Italy) | Bob Hewitt; Antonio Zugarelli | 4; 6 | 6; 0 | 9; 7 | 4; 6 | 6; 1 |
| 2 | (South Africa) (Italy) | Ray Moore; Adriano Panatta | 4; 6 | 6; 4 | 6; 3 | 6; 4 |
| 3 | (South Africa) (Italy) | Bob Hewitt / Frew McMillan; Paolo Bertolucci / Adriano Panatta | 7; 5 | 6; 4 | 10; 8 |
| 4 | (South Africa) (Italy) | Ray Moore; Antonio Zugarelli | 6; 3 | 7; 5 | 6; 3 |
| 5 | (South Africa) (Italy) | Bob Hewitt; Adriano Panatta | 3; 6 | 6; 8 | 2; 6 |

=== Final ===
The final between South Africa and India was scheduled to be completed by 1 December 1974, but India refused to travel to South Africa due to their government's opposition to South Africa's apartheid policies: therefore, the final was scratched and South Africa were awarded the Davis Cup.
