= Bruce Nichols =

American tennis player

- Country (sports): United States
- Born: December 31, 1955 (age 70)
- Plays: Right-handed

Singles
- Career record: 3–19
- Career titles: 0
- Highest ranking: No. 275 (December 26, 1979)

Grand Slam singles results
- French Open: 1R (1981)
- US Open: 2R (1978)

Doubles
- Career record: 33–43
- Career titles: 1
- Highest ranking: No. 193 (January 3, 1983)

Grand Slam doubles results
- French Open: 2R (1981)
- Wimbledon: 2R (1981)
- US Open: 3R (1981)

Bruce Nichols (born December 31, 1955) is a former professional tennis player from the United States.

== Career ==
Nichols, of UCLA, partnered with John Austin to win the NCAA Division One doubles championship in 1978. He competed in the main singles draw of the US Open three times, for one win, over Tom Gorman in 1978. In the doubles, Nichols (with David Graham) made the third round of the US Open in 1981 and narrowly missed out on a spot in the quarter-finals, losing to John Newcombe and Fred Stolle in five sets. It was in doubles that he had most of his success on tour, winning the Lagos Open in 1980 and finishing runner-up at both South Orange and Bogota the previous year.

== Grand Prix career finals ==
=== Doubles: 3 (1–2) ===
Result	W/L	Date	Tournament	Surface	Partner	Opponents	Score
Loss	0–1	Aug 1979	South Orange, US	Clay	(United States) Fritz Buehning	(United States) Peter Fleming (United States) John McEnroe	1–6, 3–6
Loss	0–2	Nov 1979	Bogotá, Colombia	Clay	(United States) Charles Owens	(Mexico) Emilio Montaño (Colombia) Jairo Velasco	2–6, 4–6
Win	1–2	Mar 1980	Lagos, Nigeria	Clay	(United States) Tony Graham	(Sweden) Kjell Johansson (Finland) Leo Palin	6–3, 0–6, 6–3

== Challenger titles ==
=== Doubles: (2) ===
No.	Year	Tournament	Surface	Partner	Opponents	Score
1.	1979	Huntington Beach, US	Hard	(United States) Billy Martin	(United States) Peter Rennert (United States) Robert Van't Hof	3–6, 7–6, 6–3
2.	1981	Barcelona, Spain	Clay	(United States) Tim Garcia	(Italy) Gianni Marchetti (Italy) Enzo Vattuone	6–4, 6–4
