= International Tennis Championships of Colombia =

Defunct tennis tournament
- Event name: International Tennis Championships of Colombia
- Tour: Grand Prix circuit
- Founded: 1977
- Abolished: 1980
- Editions: 4
- Location: Bogotá, Colombia
- Surface: Clay / outdoor

The International Tennis Championships of Colombia is a defunct Grand Prix affiliated men's tennis tournament played from 1977 to 1980. It was held in Bogotá, Colombia and played on outdoor clay courts.

== Finals ==
=== Singles ===
Year	Champions	Runners-up	Score
1977	(Argentina) Guillermo Vilas	(Spain) José Higueras	6–1, 6–2, 6–3
1978	(Paraguay) Víctor Pecci	(West Germany) Rolf Gehring	6–4, 3–6, 6–3, 6–3
1979	(Paraguay) Víctor Pecci	(Colombia) Jairo Velasco Sr.	6–3, 6–4
1980	(France) Dominique Bedel	(Brazil) Carlos Kirmayr	6–4, 7–6

=== Doubles ===
Year	Champions	Runners-up	Score
1977	(Chile) Hans Gildemeister (Chile) Belus Prajoux	(Venezuela) Jorge Andrew (Brazil) Carlos Kirmayr	6–4, 6–2
1978	(Chile) Álvaro Fillol (Chile) Jaime Fillol	(Chile) Hans Gildemeister (Paraguay) Víctor Pecci	6–4, 6–3
1979	(Italy) Emilio Montaño (Colombia) Jairo Velasco Sr.	(United States) Bruce Nichols (United States) Charles Owens	6–2, 6–4
1980	(Chile) Álvaro Fillol (Brazil) Carlos Kirmayr	(Ecuador) Andrés Gómez (Ecuador) Ricardo Ycaza	6–4, 6–3

== See also ==
- Campeonatos Internacionales de Colombia
