= Tony Bardsley =

Canadian tennis player (born 1945)

- Full name: Anthony "Tony" Bardsley
- Country (sports): Canada
- Plays: Right-handed

Singles
- Career record: 45-81
- Career titles: 2

Anthony "Tony" Bardsley (born February 9, 1945, in Saint-Jean-sur-Richelieu, Quebec) is a former top-ranking Canadian tennis player from Vancouver. He competed on the nascent professional tennis tours (Grand Prix tour and World Championship Tennis) as well as in Davis Cup for Canada.

== Early tennis ==
Bardsley went to California to pursue tennis, attending Diablo Valley College in 1963 and 1964. He returned to Vancouver to attend the University of British Columbia in 1965 and by 1967 he was British Columbia's top-ranked player. In 1969 he became the No. 2 ranked player in Canada as he finished runner-up at the Canadian National Championship (closed). He remained a top four ranked Canadian singles player through to 1975.

== Tour play ==
From 1969 through 1975, Bardsley competed in 16 tennis tour main draws in singles and 18 in doubles. He did not fare well, winning only 2 singles matches and 6 in doubles. In 1969, he lost in the first round in Cincinnati in singles to Jun Kuki 1–6, 3-6 and in doubles playing with fellow Davis Cup player Don McCormick. The following month at the Canadian Open, he was eliminated by compatriot Harry Fauquier in straight sets while in doubles he and McCormick reached the second round.

Bardsley next competed in a tour main draw at the 1971 Canadian Open, where in singles, after a first round bye, he lost to tennis legend John Newcombe, 3–6, 4–6. In doubles, he and McCormick lost their opening match. His next event was the 1972 Canadian Open where again after a first round bye he went out in the round of 32, this time to Terry Ryan, 5–7, 4–6. In doubles, this time playing with a different Canadian, Ken Binns, Bardsley reached the second round by defeating the Australian duo of John Cooper and Colin Dibley. Later that autumn, Bardsley also participated in the tour WCT Vancouver event. There he lost in the first round to Fred Stolle by the respectable score of 5–7, 6–7. In doubles, he and McCormick lost in the first round.

Bardsley competed in three singles main draws in 1973 and five doubles draws. He won his first singles tour match in defeating Mike Estep at the Calgary Indoor, 7–6, 7–6. He lost in the next round to the iconic Ion Țiriac, 5–7, 6–7. The Vancouver WCT, moved to April, was where Bardsley saw his next tour main draw action. He lost in the first round in singles to Tom Gorman, 2–6, 4–6, while in doubles he and partner Bob Carmichael also fell at the first hurdle. In August at the Canadian Open, he lost in the first round, again, this time to John Alexander, 4–6, 6–7. He lost his first match in doubles too, partnering Canadian Keith Carpenter. He played in two further tournaments in the autumn in doubles. At the Seattle Grand Prix, he and William Brown reached the second round while at the Quebec Grand Prix, Bardsley and partner C. Burr lost in the first. In the last computer rankings released for the year, in December, Bardsley was listed as World No. 213.

In early February 1974, Bardsley won the Washington State Indoor Open in Seattle. For the 1974 WCT circuit, Bardsley appeared in more singles main draws than doubles, six and five. Later that month, at the WCT Toronto, he lost in singles to Patrick Proisy, 1–6, 2–6, while in doubles he and partner Carpenter reached the second round. At the Salisbury Grand Prix (in Maryland), after a first round bye, Bardsley lost to another tennis icon, Jimmy Connors, 1–6, 2–6. In doubles, Tony reached the second round again, partnering Lars Elvstrøm. The following month at Calgary, he lost to Ian Crookenden 2–6, 6–7, while in doubles he and Elvstrøm lost in the first round. The duo did likewise the following week at the Jackson Grand Prix (in Jackson, Mississippi) while in singles, Bardsley was knocked out by Kim Warwick, 3–6, 5–7. His next play occurred in June at a Wimbledon Championships tune-up event, Beckenham, where Bardsley defeated Colin Dowdeswell 3–6, 6–3, 6–3 before falling to Syd Ball, 3–6, 6–3, 3–6. His July, 1974 (singles) ranking ended up being his career best, world No. 207. (Doubles rankings were kept until after Bardsley left the tour.) His final event for the year was the Canadian Open where Bardsley went out in the first round to yet another legend to be, Björn Borg, 3–6, 1–6. In doubles, he and Don McCormick lost in the first round. His finished the year ranked World No. 228.

In his final year on the tour, Bardsley appeared in the main draw of three events. At the Toronto Indoor WCT in February, he lost his opening singles match to Grover Raz Reid, 2–6, 3–6, while in doubles he and McCormick went out again in the first round. Bardsley next played outside of North America for the first time, at the Swedish Open, where he competed in the main draw just in doubles. He and partner Mike Power lost however in the first round. Bardsley's last tour main draw appearance was at the 1975 Canadian Open. He lost in singles to Paul Kronk, 4–6, 2–6, while in doubles he and partner David Brown reached the second round. He finished the year ranked World No. 308.

== Davis Cup ==
Bardsley played in seven Davis Cup ties for Canada and had a match win–loss record of 7 and 8, 4 and 6 in singles and 3 and 2 in doubles. In 1972, in the North and Central America Group semi-finals, he lost both of his singles rubbers in straight sets, to Raúl Ramírez in Round 2 and Joaquín Loyo-Mayo in Round 4, as Canada lost the tie to Mexico 2–3.

The following year in the group quarter-finals, Canada fell to Colombia in Bogotá, 1–4. Canada No. 1 Mike Belkin was forced to retire in the opening rubber. Bardsley then was defeated in Round 2 to Jairo Velasco, despite taking the opening set. Colombia won the encounter with Velasco and Iván Molina easily taking the doubles tie over Bardsley and his oft partner Don McCormick, 3–6, 4–6, 3–6. Bardsley did take Canada's only rubber for the tie, defeating Javier Restrepo, 8–6, 7–5, 6–1. The loss meant Canada had to play the Caribbean/West Indies Davis Cup team, a contest that they won. Bardsley won the opening rubber handily, 6–1, 6–4, 7–5 over Leo Rolle, and the doubles match partnering McCormick, also in straight sets.

The following month, Canada faced Mexico again in the group semi-final, this time in Mexico City. Once again they lost, this time 1 won rubber to 4. Raúl Ramírez easily beat Bardsley 1–6, 3–6, 2–6 in Round 2 and he and McCormick came back from two sets down to level their tie before losing the fifth, 5–7. A year later in October, 1974, Canada and Mexico once again faced each other in the North and Central America group semi-final, and again the Mexicans prevailed 4–1. McCormick lost the first match and Bardsley the second, 2–6, 2–6, 2–6 to Loyo-Mayo. Pierre Lamarche and Réjean Genois contested the doubles rubber this time, and were soundly beaten, 1–6, 0–6, 2–6 to Ramírez and Vicente Zarazua.

Bardsley's last Davis Cup action came the following year, 1975. Canada opened America Group play defeating Colombia 5–0 at Rockland Tennis Club in Montreal. Bardsley opened the tie defeating Orlando Agudelo 6–0, 6–3, 6–2. In doubles, Bardsley and Génois beat Agudelo and Álvaro Betancur also in straight sets. Then in a dead rubber Bardsley beat Javier Restrepo, 6–2, 6–4, 6–2. Once again Canada faced Mexico, this time in the group quarter-finals. Bardsley played just the doubles rubber – he and Génois won the first and fourth sets before losing the fifth 4–6. Canada yet again fell to Mexico, for the ninth straight time since 1952, this time by the score of 2 matches to 3.

== Post-tour tennis ==
In the last five years of his competitive career, Bardsley focused on tournaments in the Pacific Northwest, earning the #1 ranking in the region in 1977. His last year of competitive tennis was 1981, when he won the BC Nike Grand Prix tennis circuit and earned the #1 ranking in British Columbia.

Bardsley later served as head tennis professional at Shaughnessy Golf & Country Club from 1978 until 1990 and volunteer director of tournament operations for the ITF Federation Cup held in West Vancouver in 1987. He also volunteered many hours on Tennis BC's board of directors in charge of coaching certification, all the time working for the improvement of tennis in his native province.

== Personal ==
Bardsley was inducted into the British Columbia Sports Hall of Fame in 2007.
