= Abraham Sojo =

Venezuelan tennis player (born 1955)

- Country (sports): Venezuela
- Born: 21 June 1955 (age 69); Barlovento, Venezuela
Medal record
Central American and Caribbean Games
Bronze medal – third place	1978 Medellín	Singles

Abraham Sojo (born 21 June 1955) is a Venezuelan former tennis player.

Born in Barlovento, Sojo represented Venezuela in four Davis Cup ties and was a singles bronze medalist at the 1978 Central American and Caribbean Games in Medellín.

Sojo now coaches tennis and was briefly captain of Venezuela's Davis Cup team in 1992.
