= Don McCormick =

Canadian tennis player

- Full name: Donald McCormick
- Country (sports): Canada
- Born: 12 April 1945 (age 81) Vancouver, British Columbia, Canada
- Height: 5 ft 11 in (180 cm)
- Plays: Right-handed

Singles
- Career record: 44-73
- Career titles: 3

Grand Slam singles results
- Australian Open: 1R (1972)

Doubles
- Career record: 1–10

Grand Slam mixed doubles results
- Wimbledon: 3R (1972)

Donald McCormick (born 12 April 1945) is a former Canadian No. 1 professional tennis player.

McCormick was active on the tour during the 1960s and 1970s. In 1966 he won the Vancouver Island championships, and was runner-up in both the 1967 Pacific Western Indoors and in the 1968 Pacific Western Indoors at Eugene, Oregon.

In 1969, McCormick was runner-up in tennis at the Canada Games to Robert Bédard, winning the Silver Medal. In 1972 he made the mixed doubles third round of the Wimbledon Championships with Patricia Cody.

McCormick won the Dorval Open in Quebec in 1974. That same year he also won the Canadian Grand Prix tournament series, winning the championship match over Tony Bardsley. McCormick was ranked Canadian No. 1 for 1974.

He played Davis Cup for Canada from 1973 to 1975 and had a win over the Mexican No. 1 Joaquín Loyo Mayo.

McCormick was a schoolteacher by profession, and grew up in Victoria, British Columbia.

== See also ==
- List of Canada Davis Cup team representatives
