= Emilio Montaño =

Mexican tennis player (born 1953)

- Full name: Emilio Montaño
- Country (sports): Mexico
- Born: 18 December 1953 (age 72) Mexico City, Mexico
- Plays: Right-handed

Singles
- Career record: 18–47
- Career titles: 0
- Highest ranking: No. 120 (2 July 1977)

Grand Slam singles results
- French Open: 2R (1977)
- Wimbledon: 1R (1977)

Doubles
- Career record: 29–45
- Career titles: 1

Grand Slam doubles results
- French Open: 2R (1973, 1977, 1980)
- Wimbledon: 2R (1976)
- US Open: 1R (1977)

Emilio Montaño (born 18 December 1953) is a former professional tennis player from Mexico.

== Biography ==
Montaño, who won the Junior Orange Bowl in 1967, was Guillermo Vilas's opponent when the Argentine won the Under-16s Orange Bowl title in 1968.

He attended Rice University in the early 1970s and played for a highly ranked collegiate tennis team which included Harold Solomon.

Following college, Montaño competed professionally on the Grand Prix and WCT circuits. His best singles performances at Grand Prix tournaments were quarter-final appearances at Hong Kong in 1976 and South Orange in 1979. As a doubles player he won a Grand Prix title at Bogotá in 1979, with local player Jairo Velasco.

In Grand Slam competition he made the second round of the singles once, at the 1977 French Open. He defeated Werner Zirngibl in the first round, only dropping five games, but was unable to get past his second round opponent Brian Fairlie.

He also represented the Mexico Davis Cup team, in a total of six matches, which included a 1976 tie against the United States in Tucson. In 1979 he won a five-set reverse singles match against Canada's Robert Bettauer which secured a tie for Mexico.

== Grand Prix career finals ==
=== Doubles: 1 (1–0) ===
Result	No.	Year	Tournament	Surface	Partner	Opponents	Score
Win	1.	1979	Bogotá, Colombia	Clay	(Colombia) Jairo Velasco	(United States) Bruce Nichols (United States) Charles Owens	6–2, 6–4

== See also ==
- List of Mexico Davis Cup team representatives
