= Fernando Maynetto =

Peruvian tennis player

- Country (sports): Peru
- Residence: Naples, FL, U.S.
- Born: 2 December 1955 (age 70) Lima, Peru
- Plays: Right-handed

Singles
- Career record: 7–21
- Career titles: 0
- Highest ranking: No. 104 (May 1981)

Grand Slam singles results
- French Open: 1R (1981, 1982)
- Wimbledon: 1R (1981)
- US Open: 1R (1980)

Doubles
- Career record: 14–31
- Career titles: 0
- Highest ranking: No. 85 (June 1981)

Grand Slam doubles results
- French Open: 1R (1979, 1981, 1982)
- Wimbledon: 3R (1981)
- US Open: 1R (1981)

Fernando Maynetto (born 2 December 1955) is a former professional tennis player from Peru.

== Career ==
Maynetto, a national junior college champion, played at Wingate College, before joining Clemson University in 1975.

He represented Peru in 10 Davis Cup ties during his career, from 1975 to 1985, but won just three of his 20 rubbers.

The Peruvian reached the round of 16 in the men's doubles at the 1981 Wimbledon Championships, with Roberto Carruthers as his partner. He wasn't ever able to make it past the opening round of the singles draw in a Grand Slam, from four attempts. One of his losses was to Ivan Lendl at the 1982 French Open.

His best results on tour came in the doubles, with two semi-final appearances, at Bogota in 1979 (partnering Ramiro Benavides) and Indianapolis in 1980 (partnering Carlos Gattiker). He was a singles quarter-finalist at the Chilean Open in 1978 and at the South Orange Open two years later.
