= John Antonas =

Bahamian tennis player

- Country (sports): Bahamas; Caribbean/West Indies
- Born: 12 September 1951 (age 73); Nassau, Bahamas

Singles
- Career record: 0–4
- Highest ranking: No. 258 (16 January 1978)

John Antonas (born 12 September 1951) is a Bahamian former professional tennis player.

Born in Nassau, Antonas represented the Caribbean at the 1975 Nations Cup (later World Team Cup) and in the Davis Cup from 1975 to 1982. In 1989 he got the opportunity to compete for the Bahamas Davis Cup team as playing captain of the side, which was debuting in the competition. He stayed on as non playing captain throughout the 1990s.

Antonas ranked 258 on the professional tour and played collegiate tennis for the University of Alabama.

In 1979, while a tennis pro in the Bahamas, Antonas played tennis against the Shah of Iran, Mohammad Reza Pahlavi.
