= Javier Restrepo =

Colombian tennis player (born 1953)

- Country (sports): Colombia
- Born: 14 February 1953 (age 72); Medellín, Colombia
- Plays: Left-handed

Singles
- Career record: 3–11
- Highest ranking: No. 203 (4 Jan 1982)

Grand Slam singles results
- French Open: 1R (1981)

Doubles
- Career record: 3–12
- Highest ranking: No. 449 (16 Jul 1984)

Javier Restrepo (born 14 February 1953) is a Colombian former professional tennis player.

Born and raised in Medellín, Restrepo was a left-handed player and reached a career best singles world ranking of 203, while also featuring in four Davis Cup ties for Colombia.

Restrepo made his only grand slam main draw appearance at the 1981 French Open and had a win in qualifying over Mats Wilander, who the following year would claim the title.

Since the early 1980s he has been based in Rio de Janeiro as a tennis coach.
