= Richard Russell (tennis) =

Jamaican tennis player (1945–2025)

- Country (sports): Caribbean/West Indies; Jamaica
- Born: 8 September 1945; Kingston, Jamaica
- Died: 15 January 2025 (aged 79); Montego Bay, Jamaica

Singles
- Career record: 173–241
- Career titles: 5

Grand Slam singles results
- Australian Open: 2R (1964, 1966, 1967)
- French Open: 2R (1974)
- Wimbledon: 2R (1969)
- US Open: 2R (1968)

Richard Russell (8 September 1945 – 15 January 2025) was a Jamaican professional tennis player.

== Life and career ==
Russell was the only Jamaican to progress past the first round at all four grand slam tournaments. At the 1966 Australian Championships he won his first round match over Richie Chopra, 6–0, 6–0, 6–0. In July 1965 he won the singles title at the All-Jamaica Tennis Championships for the second time.

Russell won the 1966 Kingston International Championships at Kingston, Jamaica defeating Arthur Ashe in the final in three sets. This was an annual tournament on the international ILTF Caribbean Circuit and Russell would be the only Jamaican to win the event. The same season he was a finalist at the Budleigh Salterton Open played on grass in England where he lost to Brian Fairlie.

Outside of grand slam competition, he had a noted win over Dennis Ralston in 1972 at an invitational tournament in Puerto Rico. In 1975 he took part in the inaugural Nations Cup (then the name of the World Team Cup), as a member of the Caribbean team. The same year he won the Kenya Championships in Nairobi against David Lloyd.

=== Davis Cup ===
A national champion at the age of 16, Russell represented the Caribbean/West Indies in Davis Cup competition. He was the team's most successful player during its existence, winning a record ten rubbers between 1964 and 1976, eight of those in singles. In the 1966 Davis Cup competition he won the deciding fifth rubber over Venezuela's Isaías Pimentel to give the Caribbean/West Indies their first ever win in a tie and also won a doubles match against the American duo of Arthur Ashe and Charlie Pasarell. In 1972 he won a singles rubber against Erik van Dillen of the United States.

=== Personal life and death ===
Russell died from pneumonia in Montego Bay, on 15 January 2025, at the age of 79.

His son, Ryan, played in the Davis Cup for Jamaica.
