= Jairo Velasco Sr. =

Colombian tennis player

Jairo Velasco
- Full name: Jairo Velasco Sr.
- Country (sports): Colombia
- Residence: Barcelona, Spain
- Born: 9 May 1947 (age 78) Bogotá, Colombia
- Height: 1.73 m (5 ft 8 in)
- Plays: Right-handed

Singles
- Career record: 125–164
- Career titles: 0
- Highest ranking: No. 46 (20 December 1982)

Grand Slam singles results
- French Open: 2R (1969, 71, 75, 82, 83)
- Wimbledon: 1R (1972, 1975)
- US Open: 4R (1976)

Doubles
- Career record: 105–116
- Career titles: 2

Grand Slam doubles results
- French Open: 4R (1971)
- Wimbledon: 2R (1974)
- US Open: 2R (1972)

Grand Slam mixed doubles results
- French Open: SF (1973)
- Wimbledon: 3R (1973)
- US Open: 1R (1972)

Jairo Velasco Sr. (born 9 May 1947) is a former professional tennis player from Colombia. (Note: ATP sources erroneously have him representing Spain during his career) Velasco has additionally several Senior World Championship titles in different age classes in singles, doubles and mixed doubles.

== Career ==
Velasco teamed with Iván Molina to reach the fourth round of the 1971 French Open, where they were defeated by eventual champions Arthur Ashe and Marty Riessen. In mixed doubles at the 1973 French Open, he and countrywoman Isabel Fernández de Soto lost in the semifinals in three sets to Patrice Dominguez and Betty Stöve. He became the first Colombian to reach the fourth round of the singles draw at a Grand Slam when he beat three players at the 1976 US Open, Ferdi Taygan, Barry Phillips-Moore and Bill Scanlon. His run ended when he lost to Dick Stockton. He remained the only player from his country to go that deep in a Grand Slam tournament until Alejandro Falla made the four round at the 2011 French Open.

The Colombian made seven doubles finals on the Grand Prix tennis circuit, winning two, at Kitzbühel and at home in Bogota. He also made the singles final at Bogota, in 1979, but lost to Víctor Pecci.

He won 24 singles rubbers for the Colombia Davis Cup team, a national record. In all, he participated in 21 ties and won a total of 33 matches, being victorious in nine doubles rubbers. He was most notably a member of the side which defeated the United States in the North & Central America Zone final of the 1974 Davis Cup, beating both Harold Solomon and Erik van Dillen in his two singles rubbers. In the Americas Inter-Zonal final, which featured the South African team, Velasco lost his first match to Bob Hewitt and was defeated in the doubles, to surrender the tie. He then beat Ray Moore in a dead rubber. The Colombians, with Velasco in the side, made the Inter-Zonal final again in 1981, but were defeated by Chile.

=== Seniors ===
World Singles Champion:

- 1994 Buenos Aires, 45+
- 1996 Velden, 45+
- 1997 Johannesburg, 50+
- 2019 Umag, 70+
- 2023 Mallorca, 75+

World Doubles Champion:

- 1994 Buenos Aires, 45+
- 1996 Velden, 45+
- 1997 Johannesburg, 50+
- 2012 Umag, 65+
- 2021 Mallorca, 70+
- 2022 Florida, 75+

World Mixed Champion:

- 2019 Umag, 70+
- 2021 Mallorca, 70+
- 2022 Florida, 75+
- 2023 Mallorca, 75+

== Personal ==
Early in his career, Velasco moved to Barcelona in Spain, where he still lives. He married a woman from the area, and they have three children, including Jairo Velasco Jr., a doubles specialist on the ATP Tour and Gabriela Velasco Andreu, who has been in the world's top 400.

== Grand Prix career finals ==
=== Singles: 1 (0–1) ===
Result	W-L	Date	Tournament	Surface	Opponent	Score
Loss	0–1	Nov 1979	Bogotá, Colombia	Clay	(Paraguay) Víctor Pecci	3–6, 4–6

=== Doubles: 7 (2–5) ===
Result	W-L	Date	Tournament	Surface	Partner	Opponents	Score
Loss	0–1	Mar 1974	Calgary, Canada	Carpet (i)	(Colombia) Iván Molina	(West Germany) Jürgen Fassbender (West Germany) Karl Meiler	4–6, 4–6
Loss	0–2	Mar 1974	Salt Lake City, United States	Hard (i)	(Colombia) Iván Molina	(United States) Jimmy Connors (United States) Vitas Gerulaitis	6–2, 6–7, 5–7
Win	1–2	Jul 1974	Kitzbühel, Austria	Clay	(Colombia) Iván Molina	(Czechoslovakia) František Pála (Hungary) Balázs Taróczy	2–6, 7–6, 6–4, 6–4
Loss	1–3	Apr 1977	Florence, Italy	Clay	(Colombia) Iván Molina	(New Zealand) Chris Lewis (New Zealand) Russell Simpson	6–2, 6–7, 2–6
Loss	1–4	Nov 1979	Quito, Ecuador	Clay	(Colombia) Iván Molina	(Chile) Jaime Fillol (Chile) Álvaro Fillol	7–6, 3–6, 1–6
Win	2–4	Nov 1979	Bogotá, Colombia	Clay	(Mexico) Emilio Montaño	(United States) Bruce Nichols (United States) Charles Owens	6–2, 6–4
Loss	2–5	Feb 1981	Mar del Plata, Argentina	Clay	(Spain) Ángel Giménez	(Australia) David Carter (Australia) Paul Kronk	7–6, 4–6, 0–6

== Challenger titles ==
=== Singles: 3 ===
No.	Year	Tournament	Surface	Opponent	Score
1.	1979	Le Touquet, France	Clay	(Spain) Fernando Luna	4–6, 6–3, 6–3, 6–1
2.	1981	Tarragona, Spain	Clay	(Spain) Eduardo Osta	6–4, 6–2
3.	1982	Porto, Portugal	Clay	(Spain) Juan Avendaño	6–7, 6–3, 6–3

=== Doubles: 1 ===
No.	Year	Tournament	Surface	Partner	Opponents	Score
1.	1979	Le Touquet, France	Clay	(Spain) Antonio Muñoz	(France) Éric Deblicker (France) Georges Goven	6–0, 3–6, 6–3
