= South Africa Davis Cup team =

South African national tennis team

South Africa
- Captain: Marcos Ondruska
- Nations Ranking: 51 ▲1 (20 September 2021)
- Colors: Green & White
- First year: 1913
- Years played: 63
- Ties played (W–L): 149 (88–61)
- Years in World Group: 5 (3–4)
- Davis Cup titles: 1 (1974)
- Most total wins: Wayne Ferreira (41–18)
- Most singles wins: Cliff Drysdale (32–12)
- Most doubles wins: Frew McMillan (23–5)
- Best doubles team: Bob Hewitt & Frew McMillan (16–1)
- Most ties played: Frew McMillan (28)
- Most years played: Wayne Ferreira (13)
- Last updated on: April 2020.

The South Africa men's national tennis team represents South Africa in Davis Cup tennis competition and are governed by the Tennis South Africa. South Africa won the Davis Cup in 1974 by default as India withdrew from the finals as a protest against apartheid policies. They currently compete in Group II of the Europe/Africa Zone. They competed in the World Group from 1995 to 1998.

== History ==
South Africa competed in its first Davis Cup in 1913. Their player with the most single wins all-time is Cliff Drysdale with 32 and in doubles it is Frew McMillan with 23.

In 1974, they won the cup by default after India withdrew in protest against South African apartheid policies.

== Current team (2022) ==
- Philip Henning
- Lleyton Cronje
- Raven Klaasen
- Christo van Rensburg (Captain-player)

== See also ==
- List of South Africa Davis Cup team representatives
- Davis Cup
- South Africa Billie Jean King Cup team
- South Africa at the Hopman Cup
