= Ricardo Ycaza =

Ecuadorian tennis player

- Country (sports): Ecuador
- Born: 16 February 1958 (age 68) Guayaquil, Ecuador
- Height: 1.83 m (6 ft 0 in)
- Turned pro: 1977
- Retired: 1986
- Plays: Right-handed
- Prize money: $133,237

Singles
- Career record: 61–95
- Career titles: 0
- Highest ranking: No. 44 (20 July 1981)

Grand Slam singles results
- French Open: 4R (1981)
- Wimbledon: 2R (1979)
- US Open: 3R (1977)

Doubles
- Career record: 108–96
- Career titles: 3
- Highest ranking: No. 47 (4 January 1982)

Ricardo Ycaza (born 16 February 1958) is an Ecuadorian tennis player who was a world top 10 junior, a Davis Cup stalwart, and a world top 100 touring professional.

== Tennis career ==
His most noteworthy achievement was winning the 1976 US Open Junior tournament. In the semi-finals of that tournament, he staged a third-set comeback to defeat John McEnroe after saving two match points at 2–5 in the third set and after coming back from 2–4 in the third-set tiebreaker. (Ycaza was to face McEnroe three more times in junior tournaments, winning each time.) In the final, Ycaza defeated José Luis Clerc of Argentina. In May 1977, Ycaza again defeated John McEnroe in three sets to win the World Championship of Tennis Men's 21-and-under tournament in Houston, Texas.

Coached by Miguel Olvera at the Guayaquil Tennis Club, Ycaza had a successful junior career, winning numerous South American junior titles. At the college level, he achieved All-American status for the 1976–1977 NCAA season, playing for the University of Houston. Ycaza represented Ecuador in Davis Cup matches from 1973 through 1986, teaming up with long-time friend and French Open champion Andrés Gómez in several important doubles triumphs against the likes of Argentina and Brazil. After his playing days were over, Ycaza also served as Davis Cup captain for Ecuador.

Ycaza played on the professional tennis tour from 1977 to 1986. His career high rankings were world No. 45 in singles and No. 32 in doubles. During his professional career, he won three doubles tournaments (each with different partners). His best year on the professional tour was 1980 when he won doubles tournaments at Sarasota, Palermo, and Santiago.

== ATP Tour finals ==
=== Singles: 1 (1 runner-up) ===
Result	W/L	Date	Tournament	Surface	Opponent	Score
Loss	0–1	Jun 1981	Brussels, Belgium	Clay	(Socialist Federal Republic of Yugoslavia) Marko Ostoja	6–4, 4–6, 5–7

=== Doubles: 7 (3 titles / 4 runners-up) ===
Result	W/L	Date	Tournament	Surface	Partner	Opponents	Score
Loss	0–1	Apr 1978	Tulsa, U.S.	Hard (i)	(Brazil) Carlos Kirmayr	(New Zealand) Russell Simpson (United States) Van Winitsky	6–4, 6–7, 2–6
Win	1–1	Feb 1980	Sarasota, U.S.	Clay	(Ecuador) Andrés Gómez	(Australia) David Carter (United States) Rick Fagel	6–3, 6–4
Win	2–1	Sep 1980	Palermo, Italy	Clay	(Italy) Gianni Ocleppo	(Paraguay) Víctor Pecci (Hungary) Balázs Taróczy	6–2, 6–2
Loss	2–2	Sep 1980	Bordeaux, France	Carpet (i)	(Italy) Gianni Ocleppo	(United Kingdom) John Feaver (France) Gilles Moretton	2–6, 3–6
Loss	2–3	Nov 1980	Bogotá, Colombia	Clay	(Ecuador) Andrés Gómez	(Chile) Álvaro Fillol (Brazil) Carlos Kirmayr	4–6, 3–6
Win	3–3	Nov 1980	Santiago, Chile	Clay	(Chile) Belus Prajoux	(Brazil) Carlos Kirmayr (Brazil) João Soares	4–6, 7–6, 6–4
Loss	3–4	Nov 1981	Quito, Ecuador	Clay	(Australia) David Carter	(Chile) Hans Gildemeister (Ecuador) Andrés Gómez	5–7, 3–6
