= Miguel Olvera =

Ecuadorian tennis player

- Country (sports): Ecuador
- Born: November 14, 1939 (age 85); Salitre Canton, Ecuador

Singles
- Career record: 187–122
- Career titles: 10

Grand Slam singles results
- French Open: 3R (1962)
- Wimbledon: 1R (1962, 1966)
- US Open: 2R (1960, 1961, 1962)

Miguel Olvera (born November 14, 1939) is a tennis player active in the 1960s and 1970s, playing for Ecuador.

In 1960, as an unseeded player, he won the singles title at the Cincinnati Open, the first unseeded player ever to win the singles title there. (The tournament began in 1899 and seeding began in 1927.)

In 1967 in Guayaquil, Ecuador, Olvera and teammate Pancho Guzmán led the Ecuadorian Davis Cup to a stunning upset of the mighty United States Davis Cup team. After American Cliff Richey defeated Guzmán in the first singles match, Olvera, then 26 years old, faced Arthur Ashe in the second singles match. Ashe had never lost a set in ten previous Davis Cup matches, but Olvera came back after dropping the first set to win 4–6, 6–4, 6–4, 6–2.

Ecuadorian captain Danny Carrera was so thrilled with the win that he attempted to jump the net to embrace Olvera, tripped and broke his leg. At 21, Guzmán then teamed with Olvera in the doubles, and overcame a 0–6, 2–5 deficit to knock off Marty Riessen and Clark Graebner, 0–6, 9–7, 6–4, 4–6, 8–6. The next day, Guzmán beat Ashe in five sets to give Ecuador the victory.

Today, Olvera is a tennis coach in Guayaquil, Ecuador.
