= Jorge Andrew =

Venezuelan tennis player

- Country (sports): Venezuela
- Born: 2 November 1951 (age 74) Caracas, Venezuela
- Height: 1.88 m (6 ft 2 in)
- Turned pro: 1967
- Retired: 1982
- Plays: Right-handed (one-handed backhand)
- Prize money: $1,077,159

Singles
- Career record: 33–96
- Career titles: 0
- Highest ranking: No. 66 (31 December 1978)

Grand Slam singles results
- Australian Open: 2R (1977)
- French Open: 2R (1977)
- Wimbledon: 3R (1977)
- US Open: 2R (1976)

Doubles
- Career record: 42–91
- Career titles: 0
- Highest ranking: No. 113 (12 December 1976)

Jorge Andrew (born 2 November 1951) is a former professional tennis player from Venezuela. Most of his tennis success was in doubles. During his career, he finished runner-up at three doubles events. Andrew was a member of the Venezuelan Davis Cup team from 1967 to 1984, posting a 6–25 record in singles and a 7–10 record in doubles.

== Career finals ==
=== Doubles (3 losses) ===
Result	W/L	Date	Tournament	Surface	Partner	Opponents	Score
Loss	0–1	Jul 1974	Dublin, Ireland	Outdoor	(Argentina) Lito Álvarez	(Rhodesia) Colin Dowdeswell (South Africa) John Yuill	3–6, 2–6
Loss	0–2	Nov 1977	Bogotá, Colombia	Clay	(Brazil) Carlos Kirmayr	(Chile) Hans Gildemeister (Chile) Belus Prajoux	4–6, 2–6
Loss	0–3	Jun 1979	Berlin, Germany	Clay	(Czechoslovakia) Stanislav Birner	(Brazil) Carlos Kirmayr (Czechoslovakia) Ivan Lendl	2–6, 1–6
