= Carlos Kirmayr =

Brazilian tennis player (born 1950)

- Country (sports): Brazil
- Residence: São Paulo, Brazil
- Born: 23 September 1950 (age 75) São Paulo, Brazil
- Height: 1.72 m (5 ft 7 1/2 in)
- Plays: Right-handed
- Coach: Paulo Cleto
- Prize money: $570,207

Singles
- Career record: 139–166
- Career titles: 1
- Highest ranking: No. 36 (10 August 1981)

Grand Slam singles results
- French Open: 4R (1981)
- Wimbledon: 3R (1976, 1981)
- US Open: 2R (1983)

Doubles
- Career record: 169–140
- Career titles: 10
- Highest ranking: No. 6 (24 October 1983)

Carlos Kirmayr (born 23 September 1950) is a retired Brazilian professional tennis player.

Kirmayr won a total of 10 Grand Prix doubles titles. In singles, he achieved a career-high ranking of world No. 36 and his highest ranking in doubles was No. 6, achieved in October 1983.

== Career finals ==
=== Singles 6 (1–5) ===
Result	W/L	Year	Tournament	Surface	Opponent	Score
Loss	0–1	Dec 1976	Santiago, Chile	Clay	(Spain) José Higueras	7–5, 4–6, 4–6
Loss	0–2	Apr 1979	Cairo, Egypt	Clay	(Austria) Peter Feigl	5–7, 6–3, 1–6
Loss	0–3	Nov 1980	Bogotá, Colombia	Clay	(France) Dominique Bedel	4–6, 6–7
Win	1–3	Jan 1981	Guarujá, Brazil	Hard	(Argentina) Ricardo Cano	6–4, 6–2
Loss	1–4	May 1981	Forest Hills, U.S.	Clay	(United States) Eddie Dibbs	3–6, 2–6
Loss	1–5	Jan 1982	Guarujá, Brazil	Clay	(United States) Van Winitsky	3–6, 3–6

=== Doubles 24 (10–14) ===
Result	W/L	Year	Tournament	Surface	Partner	Opponents	Score
Win	1–0	Apr 1976	Madrid, Spain	Clay	(Brazil) José Edison Mandarino	(United States) John Andrews (Australia) Colin Dibley	7–6, 4–6, 8–6
Win	2–0	May 1976	Florence, Italy	Clay	(Australia) Colin Dibley	(Hungary) Péter Szőke (Hungary) Balázs Taróczy	5–7, 7–5, 7–5
Win	3–0	Nov 1976	Buenos Aires, Argentina	Clay	(Argentina) Tito Vázquez	(Argentina) Ricardo Cano (Chile) Belus Prajoux	6–4, 7–5
Loss	3–1	Nov 1977	Bogotá, Colombia	Clay	(Venezuela) Jorge Andrew	(Chile) Hans Gildemeister (Chile) Belus Prajoux	4–6, 2–6
Loss	3–2	Apr 1978	Tulsa, U.S.	Hard (i)	(Ecuador) Ricardo Ycaza	(New Zealand) Russell Simpson (United States) Van Winitsky	6–4, 6–7, 2–6
Loss	3–3	Jul 1978	Stuttgart, West Germany	Clay	(Chile) Belus Prajoux	(Czechoslovakia) Jan Kodeš (Czechoslovakia) Tomáš Šmíd	3–6, 6–7
Loss	3–4	Jun 1979	Brussels, Belgium	Clay	(Hungary) Balázs Taróczy	(United States) Billy Martin (Australia) Peter McNamara	7–5, 5–7, 4–6
Win	4–4	Jun 1979	Berlin, West Germany	Clay	(Czechoslovakia) Ivan Lendl	(Venezuela) Jorge Andrew (Czechoslovakia) Stanislav Birner	6–2, 6–1
Win	5–4	Sep 1979	Madrid, Spain	Clay	(Brazil) Cássio Motta	(United Kingdom) Robin Drysdale (United Kingdom) John Feaver	7–6, 6–4
Loss	5–5	Oct 1979	Barcelona, Spain	Clay	(Brazil) Cássio Motta	(Italy) Paolo Bertolucci (Italy) Adriano Panatta	4–6, 3–6
Loss	5–6	Jul 1980	Kitzbühel, Austria	Clay	(New Zealand) Chris Lewis	(West Germany) Klaus Eberhard (West Germany) Ulrich Marten	4–6, 6–3, 4–6
Win	6–6	Nov 1980	Bogotá, Colombia	Clay	(Chile) Álvaro Fillol	(Ecuador) Andrés Gómez (Ecuador) Ricardo Ycaza	6–4, 6–3
Loss	6–7	Nov 1980	Santiago, Chile	Clay	(Brazil) João Soares	(Chile) Belus Prajoux (Ecuador) Ricardo Ycaza	6–4, 6–7, 4–6
Loss	6–8	Jun 1981	Brussels, Belgium	Clay	(Brazil) Cássio Motta	(Argentina) Ricardo Cano (Ecuador) Andrés Gómez	2–6, 2–6
Loss	6–9	Jan 1982	Guarujá, Brazil	Clay	(Brazil) Cássio Motta	(Australia) Phil Dent (Australia) Kim Warwick	7–6, 2–6, 3–6
Loss	6–10	Apr 1982	Las Vegas, U.S.	Hard	(United States) Van Winitsky	(United States) Sherwood Stewart (United States) Ferdi Taygan	6–7, 4–6
Win	7–10	Jun 1982	Venice Italy	Clay	(Brazil) Cássio Motta	(Argentina) José Luis Clerc (Romania) Ilie Năstase	6–4, 6–2
Loss	7–11	Oct 1982	Barcelona, Spain	Clay	(Brazil) Cássio Motta	(Sweden) Anders Järryd (Sweden) Hans Simonsson	3–6, 2–6
Win	8–11	Oct 1982	Cologne, West Germany	Hard (i)	(Uruguay) José Luis Damiani	(West Germany) Hans-Dieter Beutel (West Germany) Christoph Zipf	6–2, 3–6, 7–5
Win	9–11	Nov 1982	São Paulo, Brazil	Clay	(Brazil) Cássio Motta	(Australia) Peter McNamara (United States) Ferdi Taygan	6–3, 6–1
Win	10–11	Apr 1983	Lisbon, Portugal	Clay	(Brazil) Cássio Motta	(Czechoslovakia) Pavel Složil (United States) Ferdi Taygan	7–5, 6–4
Loss	10–12	Aug 1983	Indianapolis, U.S.	Clay	(Brazil) Cássio Motta	(Australia) Mark Edmondson (United States) Sherwood Stewart	3–6, 2–6
Loss	10–13	Aug 1983	Cincinnati, U.S.	Hard	(Brazil) Cássio Motta	(United States) Victor Amaya (United States) Tim Gullikson	4–6, 3–6
Loss	10–14	Sep 1985	Geneva, Switzerland	Clay	(Brazil) Cássio Motta	(Spain) Sergio Casal (Spain) Emilio Sánchez	4–6, 6–4, 5–7
