= Caribbean/West Indies Davis Cup team =

National tennis team

The Caribbean/West Indies men's national tennis team represented the nations of the West Indies in Davis Cup tennis competition from 1953–1987.

== History ==
Caribbean/West Indies competed in its first Davis Cup in 1953. They won two of their 36 ties, defeating Venezuela to reach the semifinals of the American Zone in 1966, and defeating Cuba to reach the quarterfinals of American Zone Group I in 1987. In 1968 their 0–5 defeat (to the USA) was the beginning of the record for the 17 consecutive wins for the USA.

Due to an ITLF (International Lawn Tennis Federation) ruling (in 1983) the West Indies, was no longer recognised as a Davis Cup team beyond 1987, as such four new teams were entered into the tournament over the next three years.

== Breakup ==
Following 1987, the team disbanded. Four nations began competition on their own:

- Bahamas Davis Cup team (began 1989)
- Barbados Davis Cup team (began 1990)
- Jamaica Davis Cup team (began 1988)
- Trinidad and Tobago Davis Cup team (began 1990)

The Eastern Caribbean Davis Cup team (which began competition in 1991) currently represents the smaller island nations of the Caribbean.

== See also ==
- Davis Cup
- Pacific Oceania Davis Cup team
