= 1977 Davis Cup Americas Zone =

International tennis competition

The Americas Zone was one of the three regional zones of the 1977 Davis Cup.

14 teams entered the Americas Zone in total, with 12 teams competing in the preliminary rounds to advance to the main draw and join the previous year's finalists Chile and South Africa. The winner of the main draw went on to compete in the Inter-Zonal Zone against the winners of the Eastern Zone and Europe Zone.

Argentina defeated the United States in the final and progressed to the Inter-Zonal Zone.

== Preliminary rounds ==
=== Draw ===
First Round
Brazil
bye
La Paz, Bolivia (clay)
Bolivia | 4
Peru | 1
Argentina
bye
Montevideo, Uruguay (clay)
Uruguay | 2
Ecuador | 3
Caracas, Venezuela
Venezuela | 4
Colombia | 0
bye
United States
Ottawa, Canada (indoor carpet)
Canada | 5
Caribbean/West Indies | 0
bye
Mexico

Qualifying Round
São Paulo, Brazil
Brazil | 4
Bolivia | 0
Buenos Aires, Argentina (clay)
Argentina | 4
Ecuador | 1
Caracas, Venezuela
Venezuela | 1
United States | 4
Ottawa, Canada (indoor carpet)
Canada | 2
Mexico | 3

=== First round ===
Bolivia vs. Peru

Bolivia
4
La Paz, Bolivia
30 October–1 November 1976
Clay

Peru
1

| | | | 1 | 2 | 3 | 4 | 5 |
|---|---|---|---|---|---|---|---|
| 1 | (Bolivia) (Peru) | Juan Carlos Alvarado; Fernando Maynetto | 4; 6 | 2; 6 | 2; 6 |
| 2 | (Bolivia) (Peru) | Ramiro Benavides; Luis Alberto Olmedo | 6; 0 | 6; 1 | 6; 2 |
| 3 | (Bolivia) (Peru) | Juan Carlos Alvarado / Ramiro Benavides; Fernando Maynetto / Luis Alberto Olmedo | 6; 4 | 6; 2 | 6; 2 |
| 4 | (Bolivia) (Peru) | Ramiro Benavides; Fernando Maynetto | 6; 1 | 8; 6 | 6; 1 |
| 5 | (Bolivia) (Peru) | Juan Carlos Alvarado; Christian Hohnhold | 6; 2 | 6; 0 | 6; 1 |

Uruguay vs. Ecuador

Uruguay
2
Montevideo, Uruguay
22–24 October 1976
Clay

Ecuador
3

| | | | 1 | 2 | 3 | 4 | 5 |
|---|---|---|---|---|---|---|---|
| 1 | (Uruguay) (Ecuador) | José Luis Damiani; Colón Núñez | 6; 1 | 3; 6 | 6; 2 | 4; 6 | 6; 2 |
| 2 | (Uruguay) (Ecuador) | Hugo Roverano; Ricardo Ycaza | 7; 9 | 7; 5 | 7; 9 | 3; 6 |
| 3 | (Uruguay) (Ecuador) | José Luis Damiani / Hugo Roverano; Colón Núñez / Ricardo Ycaza | 6; 3 | 6; 8 | 4; 6 | 4; 6 |
| 4 | (Uruguay) (Ecuador) | José Luis Damiani; Ricardo Ycaza | 4; 6 | 2; 6 | 1; 6 |
| 5 | (Uruguay) (Ecuador) | Hugo Roverano; Colón Núñez | 6; 3 | 8; 6 | 6; 1 |

Venezuela vs. Colombia

Venezuela
4
Caracas, Venezuela
8–10 October 1976

Colombia
0

| | | | 1 | 2 | 3 | 4 | 5 |
|---|---|---|---|---|---|---|---|---|
| 1 | (Venezuela) (Colombia) | Humphrey Hose; Javier Restrepo | 6; 2 | 6; 4 | 6; 4 |
| 2 | (Venezuela) (Colombia) | Jorge Andrew; Orlando Agudelo | 7; 5 | 12; 10 | 6; 2 |
| 3 | (Venezuela) (Colombia) | Jorge Andrew / Humphrey Hose; Orlando Agudelo / Javier Restrepo | 5; 7 | 9; 7 | 6; 2 | 6; 3 |
| 4 | (Venezuela) (Colombia) | Freddy Winckelmann; Rodrigo Ramírez | 6; 3 | 6; 1 | 6; 3 |
| 5 | (Venezuela) (Colombia) | Humphrey Hose; Orlando Agudelo | 6; 4 | 5; 7 | 6; 3 | 1; 1 | | not completed |

Canada vs. Caribbean/West Indies

Canada
5
Ottawa Athletic Club, Ottawa, Canada
29–31 October 1976
Carpet (indoors)

Caribbean/West Indies
0

| | | | 1 | 2 | 3 | 4 | 5 |
|---|---|---|---|---|---|---|---|
| 1 | (Canada) (Cricket West Indies) | James Boyce; John Antonas | 6; 2 | 6; 2 | 6; 4 |
| 2 | (Canada) (Cricket West Indies) | Réjean Genois; Leo Rolle | 6; 3 | 6; 4 | 3; 6 | 6; 1 |
| 3 | (Canada) (Cricket West Indies) | Greg Halder / Dale Power; John Antonas / Leo Rolle | 4; 6 | 6; 3 | 2; 6 | 7; 5 | 6; 4 |
| 4 | (Canada) (Cricket West Indies) | Réjean Genois; John Antonas | 9; 7 | 6; 0 | 6; 2 |
| 5 | (Canada) (Cricket West Indies) | James Boyce; Leo Rolle | 5; 7 | 9; 7 | 6; 4 | 6; 4 |

=== Qualifying round ===
Brazil vs. Bolivia

Brazil
4
São Paulo, Brazil
12–14 November 1976

Bolivia
0

| | | | 1 | 2 | 3 | 4 | 5 |
|---|---|---|---|---|---|---|---|---|
| 1 | (Brazil) (Bolivia) | Thomaz Koch; Juan Carlos Alvarado | 6; 1 | 4; 6 | 6; 1 | 6; 0 |
| 2 | (Brazil) (Bolivia) | Carlos Kirmayr; Ramiro Benavides | 6; 0 | 6; 1 | 7; 5 |
| 3 | (Brazil) (Bolivia) | Carlos Kirmayr / Thomaz Koch; Juan Carlos Alvarado / Ramiro Benavides | 6; 1 | 6; 2 | 6; 2 |
| 4 | (Brazil) (Bolivia) | Júlio Góes; Oscar Chiarella | 6; 0 | 6; 0 | 6; 4 |
| 5 | (Brazil) (Bolivia) | Carlos Kirmayr; Juan Carlos Alvarado | | | | | | not played |

Argentina vs. Ecuador

Argentina
4
Buenos Aires Lawn Tennis Club, Buenos Aires, Argentina
12–14 November 1976
Clay

Ecuador
1

| | | | 1 | 2 | 3 | 4 | 5 |
|---|---|---|---|---|---|---|---|
| 1 | (Argentina) (Ecuador) | Ricardo Cano; Ricardo Ycaza | 6; 3 | 3; 6 | 6; 1 | 6; 2 |
| 2 | (Argentina) (Ecuador) | Fernando Dalla Fontana; Miguel Olvera | 5; 7 | 8; 6 | 6; 1 | 6; 4 |
| 3 | (Argentina) (Ecuador) | Ricardo Cano / José Luis Clerc; Colón Núñez / Ricardo Ycaza | 6; 3 | 3; 6 | 8; 6 | 6; 2 |
| 4 | (Argentina) (Ecuador) | José Luis Clerc; Colón Núñez | 6; 3 | 6; 1 | 6; 1 |
| 5 | (Argentina) (Ecuador) | Fernando Dalla Fontana; Ricardo Ycaza | 3; 6 | 10; 12 | 3; 6 |

Venezuela vs. United States

Venezuela
1
Altamira Tennis Club, Caracas, Venezuela
12–14 November 1976

United States
4

| | | | 1 | 2 | 3 | 4 | 5 |
|---|---|---|---|---|---|---|---|
| 1 | (Venezuela) (United States) | Jorge Andrew; Dick Stockton | 2; 6 | 4; 6 | 7; 9 |
| 2 | (Venezuela) (United States) | Humphrey Hose; Vitas Gerulaitis | 6; 3 | 4; 6 | 3; 6 | 4; 6 |
| 3 | (Venezuela) (United States) | Jorge Andrew / Humphrey Hose; Fred McNair / Sherwood Stewart | 6; 8 | 3; 6 | 4; 6 |
| 4 | (Venezuela) (United States) | Humphrey Hose; Dick Stockton | 6; 4 | 3; 6 | 11; 9 | 9; 7 |
| 5 | (Venezuela) (United States) | Jorge Andrew; Vitas Gerulaitis | 3; 6 | 6; 1 | 3; 6 | 5; 7 |

Canada vs. Mexico

Canada
2
Ottawa Athletic Club, Ottawa, Canada
3–5 November 1976
Carpet (indoors)

Mexico
3

| | | | 1 | 2 | 3 | 4 | 5 |
|---|---|---|---|---|---|---|---|
| 1 | (Canada) (Mexico) | Réjean Genois; Joaquín Loyo Mayo | 3; 6 | 7; 9 | 6; 3 | 4; 6 |
| 2 | (Canada) (Mexico) | Dale Power; Roberto Chávez | 6; 2 | 3; 6 | 8; 6 | 6; 2 |
| 3 | (Canada) (Mexico) | James Boyce / Réjean Genois; Marcello Lara / Joaquín Loyo Mayo | 6; 3 | 7; 9 | 3; 6 | 4; 6 |
| 4 | (Canada) (Mexico) | Réjean Genois; Roberto Chávez | 4; 6 | 5; 7 | 6; 2 | 6; 0 | 1; 6 |
| 5 | (Canada) (Mexico) | Dale Power; Joaquín Loyo Mayo | 10; 8 | 6; 4 | 8; 10 | 6; 4 |

== Main draw ==
=== Draw ===
Quarterfinals; 17–19 December 1976
Chile
bye
São Paulo, Brazil (clay)
Brazil | 2
Argentina | 3
Tucson, AZ, United States (hard)
United States | 4
Mexico | 1
bye
South Africa

Semifinals; 18–20 March; 15–17 April
Buenos Aires, Argentina (clay)
Chile | 1
Argentina | 4
Newport Beach, CA, United States (hard)
United States | 4
South Africa | 1

Final; 28 April–1 May
Buenos Aires, Argentina (clay)
Argentina | 3
United States | 2

=== Quarterfinals ===
Brazil vs. Argentina

Brazil
2
São Paulo, Brazil
17–19 December 1976
Clay

Argentina
3

| | | | 1 | 2 | 3 | 4 | 5 |
|---|---|---|---|---|---|---|---|---|
| 1 | (Brazil) (Argentina) | Thomaz Koch; Ricardo Cano | 3; 6 | 7; 5 | 6; 4 | 6; 1 |
| 2 | (Brazil) (Argentina) | Carlos Kirmayr; Guillermo Vilas | 8; 10 | 1; 6 | | | | retired |
| 3 | (Brazil) (Argentina) | Carlos Kirmayr / Thomaz Koch; Lito Álvarez / Guillermo Vilas | 7; 5 | 6; 4 | 4; 6 | 6; 4 |
| 4 | (Brazil) (Argentina) | Thomaz Koch; Guillermo Vilas | 6; 4 | 1; 6 | 2; 6 | 4; 6 |
| 5 | (Brazil) (Argentina) | Carlos Kirmayr; Ricardo Cano | 6; 3 | 2; 6 | 0; 6 | 0; 6 |

United States vs. Mexico

United States
4
Racquet Club Ranch, Tucson, AZ, United States
17–19 December 1976
Hard

Mexico
1

| | | | 1 | 2 | 3 | 4 | 5 |
|---|---|---|---|---|---|---|---|
| 1 | (United States) (Mexico) | Roscoe Tanner; Raúl Ramírez | 7; 5 | 6; 4 | 6; 4 |
| 2 | (United States) (Mexico) | Arthur Ashe; Roberto Chávez | 6; 4 | 6; 4 | 6; 4 |
| 3 | (United States) (Mexico) | Bob Lutz / Stan Smith; Emilio Montaño / Raúl Ramírez | 6; 2 | 6; 3 | 6; 4 |
| 4 | (United States) (Mexico) | Roscoe Tanner; Roberto Chávez | 6; 1 | 6; 3 | 2; 6 | 6; 3 |
| 5 | (United States) (Mexico) | Arthur Ashe; Raúl Ramírez | 3; 6 | 4; 6 | 4; 6 |

=== Semifinals ===
Argentina vs. Chile

Argentina
4
Buenos Aires Lawn Tennis Club, Buenos Aires, Argentina
18–20 March 1977
Clay

Chile
1

| | | | 1 | 2 | 3 | 4 | 5 |
|---|---|---|---|---|---|---|---|
| 1 | (Argentina) (Chile) | Ricardo Cano; Patricio Cornejo | 8; 6 | 4; 6 | 6; 2 | 6; 8 | 6; 2 |
| 2 | (Argentina) (Chile) | Guillermo Vilas; Jaime Fillol | 8; 6 | 3; 6 | 6; 2 | 6; 3 |
| 3 | (Argentina) (Chile) | Lito Álvarez / Guillermo Vilas; Patricio Cornejo / Jaime Fillol | 3; 6 | 0; 6 | 8; 10 |
| 4 | (Argentina) (Chile) | Ricardo Cano; Jaime Fillol | 6; 4 | 6; 4 | 6; 4 |
| 5 | (Argentina) (Chile) | Guillermo Vilas; Patricio Cornejo | 6; 1 | 6; 1 | 6; 3 |

United States vs. South Africa

United States
4
Newport Beach Tennis Club, Newport Beach, CA, United States
15–17 April 1977
Hard

South Africa
1

| | | | 1 | 2 | 3 | 4 | 5 |
|---|---|---|---|---|---|---|---|
| 1 | (United States) (South Africa) | Roscoe Tanner; Byron Bertram | 6; 4 | 6; 2 | 1; 6 | 6; 4 |
| 2 | (United States) (South Africa) | Brian Gottfried; Raymond Moore | 6; 4 | 6; 2 | 6; 3 |
| 3 | (United States) (South Africa) | Bob Lutz / Stan Smith; Byron Bertram / Frew McMillan | 7; 5 | 6; 1 | 3; 6 | 6; 3 |
| 4 | (United States) (South Africa) | Roscoe Tanner; Raymond Moore | 7; 9 | 4; 6 | 7; 5 | 2; 6 |
| 5 | (United States) (South Africa) | Brian Gottfried; Byron Bertram | 6; 4 | 6; 3 | 6; 4 |

=== Final ===
Argentina vs. United States

Argentina
3
Buenos Aires Lawn Tennis Club, Buenos Aires, Argentina
28 April–1 May 1977
Clay

United States
2

| | | | 1 | 2 | 3 | 4 | 5 |
|---|---|---|---|---|---|---|---|
| 1 | (Argentina) (United States) | Ricardo Cano; Dick Stockton | 3; 6 | 6; 4 | 8; 6 | 6; 4 |
| 2 | (Argentina) (United States) | Guillermo Vilas; Brian Gottfried | 6; 4 | 6; 0 | 6; 2 |
| 3 | (Argentina) (United States) | Lito Álvarez / Ricardo Cano; Fred McNair / Sherwood Stewart | 3; 6 | 3; 6 | 3; 6 |
| 4 | (Argentina) (United States) | Guillermo Vilas; Dick Stockton | 5; 7 | 6; 2 | 6; 2 | 6; 2 |
| 5 | (Argentina) (United States) | Ricardo Cano; Brian Gottfried | 5; 7 | 5; 7 | 0; 6 |
