= 1977 Davis Cup Europe Zone =

International tennis competition

The Europe Zone was one of the three regional zones of the 1977 Davis Cup.

33 teams entered the Europe Zone, competing across 2 sub-zones. 8 teams entered the competition in the pre-qualifying rounds, competing for 3 spots in the preliminary rounds. The 3 winners in the pre-qualifying rounds joined an additional 21 teams in the preliminary rounds, with 12 teams in each sub-zone competing for 4 places in the main draw, to join the 4 finalists from the 1976 Europe Zone.

The winners of each sub-zone's main draw went on to compete in the Inter-Zonal Zone against the winners of the Americas Zone and Eastern Zone.

France defeated Romania in the Zone A final, and Italy defeated Spain in the Zone B final, resulting in both France and Italy progressing to the Inter-Zonal Zone.

== Zone A ==
=== Pre-qualifying rounds ===
==== Draw ====
First Round
Iran
bye
Algeria	w/o
Morocco

Qualifying Round
Tehran, Iran (clay)
Iran	5
Algeria	0

==== Qualifying round ====
Iran vs. Algeria

Iran
5
Imperial Tennis Club, Tehran, Iran
25–27 August 1976
Clay

Algeria
0

			1	2	3	4	5
1	(Iran) (Algeria)	Taghi Akbari; Abdeslam Mahmoudi	6; 0	6; 4	6; 3
2	(Iran) (Algeria)	Kamyab Derafshijavan; Sebti Bounaib	6; 2	6; 2	7; 5
3	(Iran) (Algeria)	Moharram Ali Khodai / Ezzatollah Nemati; Sebti Bounaib / Abdeslam Mahmoudi	6; 2	6; 2	6; 3
4	(Iran) (Algeria)	Moharram Ali Khodai; Moussa Said	6; 0	6; 1	6; 3
5	(Iran) (Algeria)	Ezzatollah Nemati; Abdeslam Mahmoudi	6; 1	6; 3	6; 2

=== Preliminary rounds ===
==== Draw ====
First Round
Poznań, Poland (clay)
Norway	0
Poland	5
bye
West Germany
Biel, Switzerland
Switzerland	3
Rhodesia	2
bye
France
Romania
bye
Brussels, Belgium
Bulgaria	2
Belgium	3
Czechoslovakia
bye
Dublin, Ireland
Iran	2
Ireland	3

Qualifying Round
Warsaw, Poland
Poland	3
West Germany	1
Zürich, Switzerland
Switzerland	2
France	3
Bucharest, Romania (clay)
Romania	5
Belgium	0
Prague, Czechoslovakia (clay)
Czechoslovakia	5
Ireland	0

==== First round ====
Poland vs. Norway

Poland
5
Poznań, Poland
24–26 September 1976
Clay

Norway
0

			1	2	3	4	5
1	(Poland) (Norway)	Tadeusz Nowicki; Per Hegna	6; 3	6; 3	6; 2
2	(Poland) (Norway)	Wojciech Fibak; Olav Abrahamsen	6; 0	6; 0	6; 0
3	(Poland) (Norway)	Wojciech Fibak / Jacek Niedźwiedzki; Per Hegna / Jan Munch-Søegaard	6; 0	8; 6	6; 3
4	(Poland) (Norway)	Tadeusz Nowicki; Olav Abrahamsen	6; 2	6; 2	6; 1
5	(Poland) (Norway)	Wojciech Fibak; Per Hegna	6; 1	5; 7	7; 5	6; 3

Switzerland vs. Rhodesia

Switzerland
3
Biel, Switzerland
24–26 September 1976

Rhodesia
2

			1	2	3	4	5
1	(Switzerland) (Rhodesia)	Heinz Günthardt; Desmond McKenzie	6; 1	6; 2	6; 0
2	(Switzerland) (Rhodesia)	Max Hürlimann; Colin Dowdeswell	5; 7	5; 7	6; 0	3; 6
3	(Switzerland) (Rhodesia)	Heinz Günthardt / Petr Kanderal; Colin Dowdeswell / Sheridan Towers	8; 6	10; 8	6; 4
4	(Switzerland) (Rhodesia)	Heinz Günthardt; Colin Dowdeswell	6; 0	7; 9	2; 6	3; 6
5	(Switzerland) (Rhodesia)	Max Hürlimann; Desmond McKenzie	6; 2	6; 1	6; 0

Belgium vs. Bulgaria

Belgium
3
Brussels, Belgium
17–19 September 1976

Bulgaria
2

			1	2	3	4	5
1	(Belgium) (Bulgaria)	Bernard Mignot; Ljuben Genov	6; 1	2; 6	6; 3	1; 6	0; 6
2	(Belgium) (Bulgaria)	Patrick Hombergen; Bozhidar Pampoulov	8; 6	6; 1	5; 7	4; 6	6; 0
3	(Belgium) (Bulgaria)	Patrick Hombergen / Bernard Mignot; Bozhidar Pampoulov / Matei Pampoulov	6; 3	6; 4	6; 2
4	(Belgium) (Bulgaria)	Bernard Mignot; Matei Pampoulov	6; 2	6; 4	6; 4
5	(Belgium) (Bulgaria)	Patrick Hombergen; Ljuben Genov	6; 2	3; 6	6; 4	3; 6	1; 6

Ireland vs. Iran

Ireland
3
Dublin, Ireland
24–26 September 1976

Iran
2

			1	2	3	4	5
1	(Republic of Ireland) (Iran)	Sean Sorensen; Mansour Bahrami	7; 5	9; 11	3; 6	6; 2	2; 6
2	(Republic of Ireland) (Iran)	James McArdle; Kamyab Derafshijavan	6; 4	6; 2	4; 6	15; 17	6; 3
3	(Republic of Ireland) (Iran)	Michael Hickey / Sean Sorensen; Mansour Bahrami / Kamyab Derafshijavan	6; 2	2; 6	6; 4	6; 4
4	(Republic of Ireland) (Iran)	Sean Sorensen; Kamyab Derafshijavan	7; 5	6; 3	6; 3
5	(Republic of Ireland) (Iran)	James McArdle; Mansour Bahrami	3; 6	9; 11	2; 6

==== Qualifying round ====
Poland vs. West Germany

Poland
3
Warsaw, Poland
22–24 April 1977

West Germany
1

			1	2	3	4	5
1	(Poland) (West Germany)	Jacek Niedźwiedzki; Ulrich Pinner	9; 11	2; 6	1; 6
2	(Poland) (West Germany)	Wojciech Fibak; Karl Meiler	6; 0	6; 1	6; 1
3	(Poland) (West Germany)	Wojciech Fibak / Tadeusz Nowicki; Jürgen Fassbender / Karl Meiler	4; 6	8; 10	6; 3	6; 4	6; 3
4	(Poland) (West Germany)	Wojciech Fibak; Ulrich Pinner	10; 8	6; 3	6; 4
5	(Poland) (West Germany)	Jacek Niedźwiedzki; Karl Meiler						not played

Switzerland vs. France

Switzerland
2
Zürich, Switzerland
19–21 March 1977

France
3

			1	2	3	4	5
1	(Switzerland) (France)	Petr Kanderal; Patrice Dominguez	3; 6	14; 16	4; 6
2	(Switzerland) (France)	Heinz Günthardt; Jean-Louis Haillet	3; 6	3; 6	3; 6
3	(Switzerland) (France)	Petr Kanderal / Dimitri Sturdza; Patrice Dominguez / Jean-Louis Haillet	6; 4	7; 9	6; 4	1; 6	4; 6
4	(Switzerland) (France)	Petr Kanderal; Jean-Louis Haillet	15; 13	7; 5	2; 6	6; 3
5	(Switzerland) (France)	Heinz Günthardt; Patrice Dominguez	8; 6	6; 3	10; 8

Romania vs. Belgium

Romania
5
Bucharest, Romania
28 April–1 May 1977
Clay

Belgium
0

			1	2	3	4	5
1	(Romania) (Belgium)	Ilie Năstase; Bernard Boileau	6; 1	6; 4	6; 1
2	(Romania) (Belgium)	Dumitru Hărădău; Jean-Pierre Richer	6; 1	6; 3	6; 3
3	(Romania) (Belgium)	Ilie Năstase / Ion Țiriac; Johan De Muynck / Thierry Stevaux	6; 2	6; 1	6; 4
4	(Romania) (Belgium)	Dumitru Hărădău; Bernard Boileau	6; 1	6; 2	6; 3
5	(Romania) (Belgium)	Ilie Năstase; Jean-Pierre Richer	6; 2	6; 2	6; 2

Czechoslovakia vs. Ireland

Czechoslovakia
5
Prague, Czechoslovakia
22–24 April 1977
Clay

Ireland
0

			1	2	3	4	5
1	(Czechoslovakia) (Republic of Ireland)	Tomáš Šmíd; Peter Ledbetter	6; 0	6; 0	6; 2
2	(Czechoslovakia) (Republic of Ireland)	Jiří Hřebec; James McArdle	6; 0	6; 1	6; 2
3	(Czechoslovakia) (Republic of Ireland)	Jiří Granát / Tomáš Šmíd; James McArdle / John O'Brien	6; 0	6; 0	6; 2
4	(Czechoslovakia) (Republic of Ireland)	Jiří Hřebec; Peter Ledbetter	6; 0	6; 1	6; 0
5	(Czechoslovakia) (Republic of Ireland)	František Pála; James McArdle	6; 2	6; 3	6; 0

=== Main draw ===
==== Draw ====
Quarterfinals; 6–8 May
Soviet Union
bye
Warsaw, Poland
Poland	0
France	5
Bucharest, Romania (clay)
Romania	3
Czechoslovakia	1
bye
Great Britain

Semifinals; 9–11 June
Soviet Union
France	w/o
Bucharest, Romania (clay)
Romania	4
Great Britain	1

Final; 23–25 July
Paris, France (clay)
France	3
Romania	2

==== Quarterfinals ====
Poland vs. France

Poland
0
Warsaw, Poland
6–8 May 1977

France
5

			1	2	3	4	5
1	(Poland) (France)	Henryk Drzymalski; Patrice Dominguez	6; 8	2; 6	4; 6
2	(Poland) (France)	Tadeusz Nowicki; François Jauffret	0; 6	0; 6	2; 6
3	(Poland) (France)	Jacek Niedźwiedzki / Tadeusz Nowicki; Patrice Dominguez / François Jauffret	8; 6	8; 10	6; 1	3; 6	2; 6
4	(Poland) (France)	Tadeusz Nowicki; Patrice Dominguez	6; 3	5; 7	6; 8	7; 9
5	(Poland) (France)	Henryk Drzymalski; François Jauffret	4; 6	0; 6

Romania vs. Czechoslovakia

Romania
3
Bucharest, Romania
6–8 May 1977
Clay

Czechoslovakia
1

			1	2	3	4	5
1	(Romania) (Czechoslovakia)	Dumitru Hărădău; Jan Kodeš	6; 2	2; 6	2; 6	3; 6
2	(Romania) (Czechoslovakia)	Ilie Năstase; Jiří Hřebec	6; 1	1; 0				retired
3	(Romania) (Czechoslovakia)	Ilie Năstase / Ion Țiriac; Jiří Hřebec / Jan Kodeš	6; 1	6; 3	6; 3
4	(Romania) (Czechoslovakia)	Ilie Năstase; Jan Kodeš	6; 2	6; 2	6; 4
5	(Romania) (Czechoslovakia)	Dumitru Hărădău; Jiří Hřebec	1; 6	6; 3				not completed

==== Semifinals ====
France vs. Soviet Union

Due to their refusal to play against Chile in the 1976 Inter-Zonal semifinals, the Soviet Union were disqualified from the 1977 tournament. Therefore, France were declared winners by default and progressed to the final.

Romania vs. Great Britain

Romania
4
Bucharest, Romania
9–11 June 1977
Clay

Great Britain
1

			1	2	3	4	5
1	(Romania) (United Kingdom)	Ilie Năstase; John Feaver	6; 1	6; 2	4; 6	6; 4
2	(Romania) (United Kingdom)	Dumitru Hărădău; John Lloyd	2; 6	7; 5	6; 0	6; 1
3	(Romania) (United Kingdom)	Ilie Năstase / Ion Țiriac; David Lloyd / John Lloyd	9; 7	2; 6	6; 4	9; 7
4	(Romania) (United Kingdom)	Gavorielle Marcu; Richard Lewis	6; 4	1; 6	1; 6	3; 6
5	(Romania) (United Kingdom)	Dumitru Hărădău; John Feaver	5; 7	6; 3	4; 6	6; 1	6; 3

==== Final ====
France vs. Romania

France
3
Stade Roland Garros, Paris, France
23–25 July 1977
Clay

Romania
2

			1	2	3	4	5
1	(France) (Romania)	François Jauffret; Ilie Năstase	3; 6	0; 6	6; 4	6; 3	6; 1
2	(France) (Romania)	Patrick Proisy; Dumitru Hărădău	6; 2	6; 4	8; 6
3	(France) (Romania)	Patrice Dominguez / François Jauffret; Ilie Năstase / Ion Țiriac	3; 6	4; 6	6; 3	5; 7
4	(France) (Romania)	François Jauffret; Dumitru Hărădău	6; 1	6; 4	6; 4
5	(France) (Romania)	Patrick Proisy; Ilie Năstase	4; 6	6; 4	6; 8	1; 6

== Zone B ==
=== Pre-qualifying rounds ===
==== Draw ====
First Round
Israel
bye
Kenya
Turkey	w/o
Luxembourg
bye
bye
Finland

Qualifying Round
Tel Aviv, Israel (hard)
Israel	5
Turkey	0
Mondorf-les-Bains, Luxembourg
Luxembourg	0
Finland	5

==== Qualifying round ====
Israel vs. Turkey

Israel
5
Tel Aviv, Israel
17–19 September 1976
Hard

Turkey
0

			1	2	3	4	5
1	(Israel) (Turkey)	Shlomo Glickstein; Murat Gürler	6; 5	6; 1	6; 0
2	(Israel) (Turkey)	Yair Wertheimer; Cahit Ataş	6; 0	6; 0	6; 2
3	(Israel) (Turkey)	Ilan Sher / Yair Wertheimer; Murat Gürler / Ali Yenilmez	6; 1	6; 1	6; 0
4	(Israel) (Turkey)	Yair Wertheimer; Murat Gürler	6; 1	6; 3	6; 1
5	(Israel) (Turkey)	Shlomo Glickstein; Ali Yenilmez	6; 0	6; 3	6; 0

Luxembourg vs. Finland

Luxembourg
0
Mondorf-les-Bains, Luxembourg
28–30 August 1976

Finland
5

			1	2	3	4	5
1	(Luxembourg) (Finland)	Fernand Claude; Leo Palin	3; 6	2; 6	2; 6
2	(Luxembourg) (Finland)	Marc Weitzel; George Berner	0; 6	0; 6	1; 6
3	(Luxembourg) (Finland)	Fernand Claude / Marc Weitzel; George Berner / Pekka Säilä	0; 6	3; 6	1; 6
4	(Luxembourg) (Finland)	Pascal Genevo; Leo Palin	1; 6	2; 6	1; 6
5	(Luxembourg) (Finland)	Fernand Claude; George Berner	2; 6	1; 6	1; 6

=== Preliminary rounds ===
==== Draw ====
First Round
Scheveningen, Netherlands (clay)
Netherlands	5
Israel	0
bye
Yugoslavia
Athens, Greece (clay)
Greece	3
Denmark	1
bye
Spain
Sweden
bye
Lisbon, Portugal (clay)
Portugal	1
Monaco	4
Vienna, Austria
Austria	5
Finland	0
bye
Egypt

Qualifying Round
Scheveningen, Netherlands (clay)
Netherlands	0
Yugoslavia	5
Athens, Greece
Greece	0
Spain	5
Uppsala, Sweden (indoor hard)
Sweden	5
Monaco	0
Vienna, Austria
Austria	5
Egypt	0

==== First round ====
Netherlands vs. Israel

Netherlands
5
Scheveningen, Netherlands
24–26 September 1976
Clay

Israel
0

			1	2	3	4	5
1	(Netherlands) (Israel)	Louk Sanders; Shlomo Glickstein	6; 2	6; 4	6; 1
2	(Netherlands) (Israel)	Fred Hemmes; Yair Wertheimer	5; 7	8; 6	1; 6	6; 4	6; 0
3	(Netherlands) (Israel)	Fred Hemmes / Louk Sanders; Shlomo Glickstein / Yair Wertheimer	4; 6	6; 2	6; 2	6; 2
4	(Netherlands) (Israel)	Fred Hemmes; Shlomo Glickstein	6; 4	6; 2	6; 4
5	(Netherlands) (Israel)	Louk Sanders; Yair Wertheimer	6; 3	6; 0	6; 1

Greece vs. Denmark

Greece
3
Athens, Greece
24–26 September 1976
Clay

Denmark
1

			1	2	3	4	5
1	(Greece) (Denmark)	Nicolas Kelaidis; Carl-Edvard Hedelund	6; 3	4; 6	6; 8	6; 3	10; 8
2	(Greece) (Denmark)	Nicholas Kalogeropoulos; Tom Christensen	6; 1	6; 3	6; 4
3	(Greece) (Denmark)	Nicholas Kalogeropoulos / Nicolas Kelaidis; Tom Christensen / Carl-Edvard Hedelund	2; 6	4; 6	2; 6
4	(Greece) (Denmark)	Nicholas Kalogeropoulos; Carl-Edvard Hedelund	6; 2	6; 3	6; 4
5	(Greece) (Denmark)	Nicolas Kelaidis; Tom Christensen	4; 6	6; 1	7; 5	7; 9		not completed

Portugal vs. Monaco

Portugal
1
Estádio Nacional, Lisbon, Portugal
24–26 September 1976
Clay

Monaco
4

			1	2	3	4	5
1	(Portugal) (Monaco)	José Vilela; Bernard Balleret	6; 0	2; 6	3; 6	3; 6
2	(Portugal) (Monaco)	Sergio Cruz; Louis Borfiga	2; 6	4; 6	3; 6
3	(Portugal) (Monaco)	Raúl Peralta / José Vilela; Bernard Balleret / Louis Borfiga	1; 6	5; 7	2; 6
4	(Portugal) (Monaco)	Sergio Cruz; Bernard Balleret	7; 5	5; 7	7; 5	3; 6	2; 6
5	(Portugal) (Monaco)	José Vilela; Louis Borfiga	4; 6	2; 6	6; 4	3; 2		retired

Austria vs. Finland

Austria
5
Vienna, Austria
24–26 September 1976

Finland
0

			1	2	3	4	5
1	(Austria) (Finland)	Peter Feigl; Pekka Säilä	6; 4	6; 2	6; 3
2	(Austria) (Finland)	Hans Kary; Matti Timonen	6; 4	6; 2	6; 3
3	(Austria) (Finland)	Hans Kary / Cliff Letcher; George Berner / Pekka Säilä	10; 8	6; 1	6; 2
4	(Austria) (Finland)	Peter Feigl; Matti Timonen	6; 2	6; 4	6; 4
5	(Austria) (Finland)	Hans Kary; Pekka Säilä	6; 1	6; 1	6; 3

==== Qualifying round ====
Netherlands vs. Yugoslavia

Netherlands
0
Scheveningen, Netherlands
22–24 April 1977
Clay

Yugoslavia
5

			1	2	3	4	5
1	(Netherlands) (Socialist Federal Republic of Yugoslavia)	Fred Hemmes; Nikola Pilić	0; 6	3; 6	2; 6
2	(Netherlands) (Socialist Federal Republic of Yugoslavia)	Louk Sanders; Željko Franulović	6; 3	1; 6	4; 6	7; 5	2; 6
3	(Netherlands) (Socialist Federal Republic of Yugoslavia)	Louk Sanders / Rolf Thung; Željko Franulović / Nikola Pilić	0; 6	7; 9	6; 3	4; 6
4	(Netherlands) (Socialist Federal Republic of Yugoslavia)	Fred Hemmes; Željko Franulović	4; 6	2; 6	6; 4	1; 6
5	(Netherlands) (Socialist Federal Republic of Yugoslavia)	Louk Sanders; Nikola Pilić	5; 7	3; 6	2; 6

Greece vs. Spain

Greece
0
Athens, Greece
1–3 April 1977

Spain
5

			1	2	3	4	5
1	(Greece) (Spain)	Nicolas Kelaidis; José Higueras	0; 6	0; 6	1; 6
2	(Greece) (Spain)	Nicholas Kalogeropoulos; Manuel Orantes	1; 6	2; 6	0; 6
3	(Greece) (Spain)	Nicholas Kalogeropoulos / Nicolas Kelaidis; Antonio Muñoz / Javier Soler	3; 6	6; 3	2; 6	6; 8
4	(Greece) (Spain)	Nicholas Kalogeropoulos; José Higueras	4; 6	0; 6	2; 6
5	(Greece) (Spain)	Nicolas Kelaidis; Manuel Orantes	2; 6	3; 6	2; 6

Sweden vs. Monaco

Sweden
5
Fyrishallen, Uppsala, Sweden
15–17 April 1977
Hard (indoors)

Monaco
0

			1	2	3	4	5
1	(Sweden) (Monaco)	Rolf Norberg; Bernard Balleret	9; 7	3; 6	6; 4	6; 3
2	(Sweden) (Monaco)	Kjell Johansson; Louis Borfiga	6; 1	6; 1	6; 1
3	(Sweden) (Monaco)	Jan Norbäck / Douglas Palm; Bernard Balleret / Louis Borfiga	7; 5	6; 2	6; 2
4	(Sweden) (Monaco)	Rolf Norberg; Louis Borfiga	6; 3	6; 2	6; 2
5	(Sweden) (Monaco)	Kjell Johansson; Bernard Balleret	6; 1	6; 1	6; 2

Austria vs. Egypt

Austria
5
Vienna, Austria
22–24 April 1977

Egypt
0

			1	2	3	4	5
1	(Austria) (Egypt)	Cliff Letcher; Abdel-Ghani Mohammed	6; 0	6; 0	6; 1
2	(Austria) (Egypt)	Hans Kary; Ismail El Shafei	6; 2	7; 5	3; 6	6; 3
3	(Austria) (Egypt)	Hans Kary / Cliff Letcher; Tarek-Shawki El Sakka / Ismail El Shafei	6; 2	6; 2	7; 9	6; 2
4	(Austria) (Egypt)	Hans Kary; Tarek-Shawki El Sakka	6; 2	6; 0	6; 2
5	(Austria) (Egypt)	Cliff Letcher; Ismail El Shafei	6; 2	6; 2	6; 0

=== Main draw ===
==== Draw ====
Quarterfinals; 6–8 May
Hungary
bye
Belgrade, Yugoslavia
Yugoslavia	1
Spain	4
Stockholm, Sweden (indoor carpet)
Sweden	5
Austria	0
bye
Italy

Semifinals; 15–25 July
Budapest, Hungary
Hungary	2
Spain	3
Båstad, Sweden (clay)
Sweden	1
Italy	4

Final; 29 July–1 August
Barcelona, Spain
Spain	2
Italy	3

==== Quarterfinals ====
Yugoslavia vs. Spain

Yugoslavia
1
Belgrade, Yugoslavia
6–8 May 1977

Spain
4

			1	2	3	4	5
1	(Socialist Federal Republic of Yugoslavia) (Spain)	Zoltan Ilin; Manuel Orantes	1; 6	3; 6	2; 6
2	(Socialist Federal Republic of Yugoslavia) (Spain)	Nikola Pilić; José Higueras	6; 3	6; 2	6; 1
3	(Socialist Federal Republic of Yugoslavia) (Spain)	Zoltan Ilin / Nikola Pilić; Antonio Muñoz / Manuel Orantes	5; 7	6; 3	2; 6	6; 8
4	(Socialist Federal Republic of Yugoslavia) (Spain)	Zoltan Ilin; José Higueras	3; 6	1; 6	6; 4	2; 6
5	(Socialist Federal Republic of Yugoslavia) (Spain)	Nikola Pilić; Manuel Orantes	5; 7	2; 6	2; 6

Sweden vs. Austria

Sweden
5
Kungliga tennishallen, Stockholm, Sweden
6–8 May 1997
Carpet (indoors)

Austria
0

			1	2	3	4	5
1	(Sweden) (Austria)	Rolf Norberg; Cliff Letcher	4; 6	4; 6	6; 3	6; 2	6; 2
2	(Sweden) (Austria)	Kjell Johansson; Hans Kary	4; 6	7; 5	6; 4	6; 3
3	(Sweden) (Austria)	Ove Bengtson / Rolf Norberg; Hans Kary / Cliff Letcher	6; 4	6; 4	6; 3
4	(Sweden) (Austria)	Rolf Norberg; Peter Feigl	9; 7	6; 4	6; 4
5	(Sweden) (Austria)	Kjell Johansson; Cliff Letcher	6; 1	6; 3	6; 3

==== Semifinals ====
Hungary vs. Spain

Hungary
2
Budapest, Hungary
29 July–1 August 1977

Spain
3

			1	2	3	4	5
1	(Hungary) (Spain)	János Benyik; José Higueras	4; 6	1; 6	1; 6
2	(Hungary) (Spain)	Balázs Taróczy; Manuel Orantes	7; 5	4; 6	1; 6	6; 1	6; 1
3	(Hungary) (Spain)	Péter Szőke / Balázs Taróczy; José Higueras / Manuel Orantes	6; 2	6; 3	4; 6	6; 1
4	(Hungary) (Spain)	János Benyik; Manuel Orantes	9; 11	3; 6	2; 6
5	(Hungary) (Spain)	Balázs Taróczy; José Higueras	6; 0	6; 8	4; 6	4; 6

Sweden vs. Italy

Sweden
1
Båstad Tennis Stadium, Båstad, Sweden
23–25 July 1977
Clay

Italy
4

			1	2	3	4	5
1	(Sweden) (Italy)	Birger Andersson; Adriano Panatta	5; 7	4; 6	4; 6
2	(Sweden) (Italy)	Rolf Norberg; Corrado Barazzutti	3; 6	1; 6	2; 6
3	(Sweden) (Italy)	Jan Norbäck / Rolf Norberg; Paolo Bertolucci / Adriano Panatta	3; 6	3; 6	6; 3	4; 6
4	(Sweden) (Italy)	Jan Norbäck; Antonio Zugarelli	6; 1	3; 6	6; 2	6; 2
5	(Sweden) (Italy)	Birger Andersson; Corrado Barazzutti	6; 4	2; 6	1; 6	3; 6

==== Final ====
Spain vs. Italy

Spain
2
Barcelona, Spain
15–17 July 1977

Italy
3

			1	2	3	4	5
1	(Spain) (Italy)	José Higueras; Corrado Barazzutti	6; 4	6; 4	6; 3
2	(Spain) (Italy)	Manuel Orantes; Adriano Panatta	4; 6	6; 3	3; 6	1; 6
3	(Spain) (Italy)	José Higueras / Antonio Muñoz; Paolo Bertolucci / Adriano Panatta	4; 6	5; 7	4; 6
4	(Spain) (Italy)	Manuel Orantes; Corrado Barazzutti	5; 7	5; 7	1; 6
5	(Spain) (Italy)	Javier Soler; Adriano Panatta	6; 1	6; 0
