= 2006 Davis Cup Americas Zone Group I =

International tennis competition

The Americas Zone was one of the three zones of regional Davis Cup competition in 2006.

In the Americas Zone there are three different groups in which teams compete against each other to advance to the next group.

== Participating nations ==
Seeds:

1. Ecuador
2. Canada

Remaining Nations

- Brazil
- Mexico
- Peru
- Venezuela

== Draw ==
Second Round Play-offs
Higuerote, Venezuela (hard)
1	Ecuador	0
Venezuela	5

First Round Play-offs
Lima, Peru (clay)
1	Ecuador	1
Peru	4
Granby, Canada (hard)
Venezuela	1
2	Canada	3

First Round
1	Ecuador
bye
Asia, Peru (clay)
Peru	2
Brazil	3
Maracay, Venezuela (hard)
Venezuela	1
Mexico	4
bye
2	Canada

Second Round
Cuenca, Ecuador (clay)
1	Ecuador	0
Brazil	4
Mexico City (clay)
Mexico	4
2	Canada	1

- Ecuador relegated to Group II in 2007.
- Brazil and Mexico advance to World Group Play-off.

== First round ==
=== Peru vs. Brazil ===
Peru
2
Estadio Asia, Asia District, Peru
10 – 12 February 2006
Clay

Brazil
3

			1	2	3	4	5
1	(Peru) (Brazil)	Iván Miranda; Flávio Saretta	2; 6	2; 6	3; 6
2	(Peru) (Brazil)	Luis Horna; Ricardo Mello	6; 4	6; 4	6; 4
3	(Peru) (Brazil)	Luis Horna / Iván Miranda; Gustavo Kuerten / André Sá	6; 4	6^{6} 7^{8}	4; 6	7; 5	3; 6
4	(Peru) (Brazil)	Luis Horna; Flávio Saretta	6^{6} 7^{8}	6; 3	6; 2	6; 2
5	(Peru) (Brazil)	Iván Miranda; Ricardo Mello	6^{4} 7^{7}	6; 3	4; 6	2; 6

=== Venezuela vs. Mexico ===
Venezuela
1
Academia Bianchi Tenis, Maracay, Venezuela
10 – 12 February 2006
Hard

Mexico
4

			1	2	3	4	5
1	(Venezuela) (Mexico)	José de Armas; Santiago González	1; 6	0; 6	7; 5	4; 6
2	(Venezuela) (Mexico)	Yohny Romero; Miguel Gallardo Valles	4; 6	6; 4	6; 3	3; 6	10; 12
3	(Venezuela) (Mexico)	José de Armas / Yohny Romero; Bruno Echagaray / Santiago González	6; 4	0; 6	1; 6	4; 6
4	(Venezuela) (Mexico)	Jimy Szymanski; Bruno Echagaray	3; 6	2; 6
5	(Venezuela) (Mexico)	Jhonnatan Medina-Álvarez; Miguel Gallardo Valles	6; 1					retired

== Second round ==
=== Ecuador vs. Brazil ===
Ecuador
0
Cuenca Tenis y Golf Club, Cuenca, Ecuador
7 – 9 April 2006
Clay

Brazil
4

			1	2	3	4	5
1	(Ecuador) (Brazil)	Giovanni Lapentti; Flávio Saretta	6^{4} 7^{7}	4; 6				retired
2	(Ecuador) (Brazil)	Nicolás Lapentti; Ricardo Mello	7; 5	4; 6	4; 6	7; 5	4; 6
3	(Ecuador) (Brazil)	Carlos Avellán / Nicolás Lapentti; Marcos Daniel / André Sá	6^{2} 7^{7}	2; 6	3; 6
4	(Ecuador) (Brazil)	Carlos Avellán; Flávio Saretta	4; 6	4; 6
5	(Ecuador) (Brazil)	Julio César Campozano; Marcos Daniel						not played

=== Mexico vs. Canada ===
Mexico
4
Centre Deportivo Chapultepec, Mexico City, Mexico
7 – 9 April 2006
Clay

Canada
1

			1	2	3	4	5
1	(Mexico) (Canada)	Miguel Gallardo Valles; Frank Dancevic	7^{7} 6^{4}	6; 2	4; 6	6; 3
2	(Mexico) (Canada)	Santiago González; Rob Steckley	6; 3	3; 6	6; 2	6; 2
3	(Mexico) (Canada)	Bruno Echagaray / Santiago González; Frank Dancevic / Daniel Nestor	7; 5	3; 6	6^{4} 7^{7}	6^{4} 7^{7}
4	(Mexico) (Canada)	Santiago González; Frank Dancevic	6; 4	6; 4	6; 4
5	(Mexico) (Canada)	Bruno Echagaray; Philip Bester	6; 3	7^{7} 6^{4}

== First round playoffs ==
=== Peru vs. Ecuador ===
Peru
4
Estadio Hermanos Buse - Club Lawn Tenis de la Exposicion, Lima, Peru
21 – 23 July 2006
Clay

Ecuador
1

			1	2	3	4	5
1	(Peru) (Ecuador)	Matías Silva; Carlos Avellán	4; 6	7^{7} 6^{5}	7^{10} 6^{8}	6; 2
2	(Peru) (Ecuador)	Iván Miranda; Julio César Campozano	7; 5	6; 4	6; 3
3	(Peru) (Ecuador)	Iván Miranda / Matías Silva; Carlos Avellán / Julio César Campozano	6; 4	7; 5	6; 2
4	(Peru) (Ecuador)	William Lock; Jose Zunino	6; 4	6; 0
5	(Peru) (Ecuador)	Leonardo Ramírez; Juan Andrés Gómez	1; 6	2; 6

=== Canada vs. Venezuela ===
Canada
3
Le Club de Tennis de Granby, Granby, Canada
21 – 23 July 2006
Hard

Venezuela
1

			1	2	3	4	5
1	(Canada) (Venezuela)	Frank Dancevic; Daniel Vallverdu	6; 2	6; 4	6; 2
2	(Canada) (Venezuela)	Philip Bester; Jhonnatan Medina-Álvarez	7; 5	6; 4	2; 6	6; 4
3	(Canada) (Venezuela)	Frank Dancevic / Daniel Nestor; Juan de Armas / Orlando Superlano	6; 1	6; 4	7^{7} 6^{2}
4	(Canada) (Venezuela)	Rob Steckley; Jhonnatan Medina-Álvarez	7^{7} 6^{4}	4; 6	3; 3			retired
5	(Canada) (Venezuela)	Philip Bester; Daniel Vallverdu						not played

== Second round playoffs ==
=== Venezuela vs. Ecuador ===
Venezuela
5
Club Aguasal, Higuerote, Venezuela
22 – 24 September 2006
Hard

Ecuador
0

			1	2	3	4	5
1	(Venezuela) (Ecuador)	Yohny Romero; Julio César Campozano	6; 3	6; 1	6^{3} 7^{7}	6; 1
2	(Venezuela) (Ecuador)	Jhonnatan Medina-Álvarez; Carlos Avellán	0; 6	6; 3	1; 6	7; 5	3; 0	retired
3	(Venezuela) (Ecuador)	Piero Luisi / Daniel Vallverdu; Carlos Avellán / Julio César Campozano	6; 2	6; 1	6; 4
4	(Venezuela) (Ecuador)	Piero Luisi; Jose Zunino	6; 3	6; 4
5	(Venezuela) (Ecuador)	Daniel Vallverdu; Juan Andrés Gómez	6; 3	7; 5
