= List of Canada Davis Cup team representatives =

This is a list of tennis players who have represented the Canada Davis Cup team in an official Davis Cup match. Canada has taken part in the competition since 1913.

== Davis Cup players ==
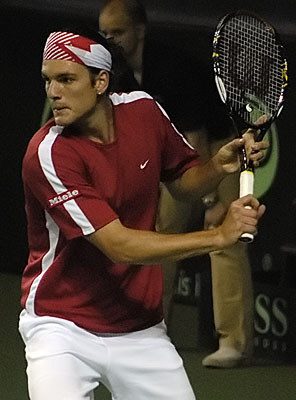
Frank Dancevic

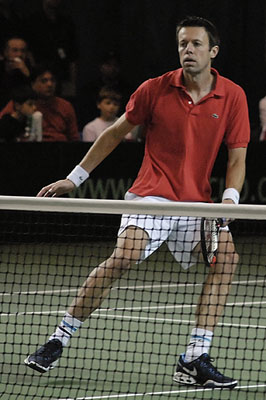
Daniel Nestor

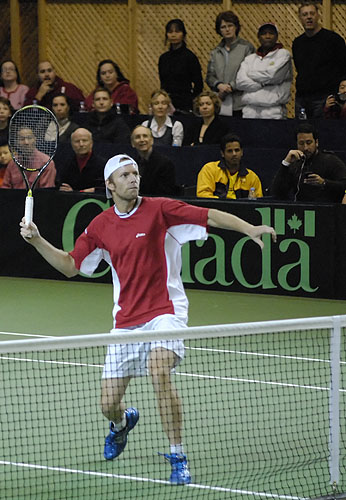
Frederic Niemeyer

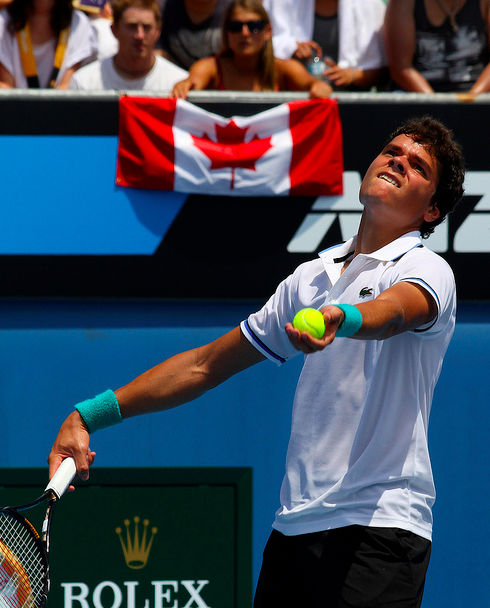
Milos Raonic

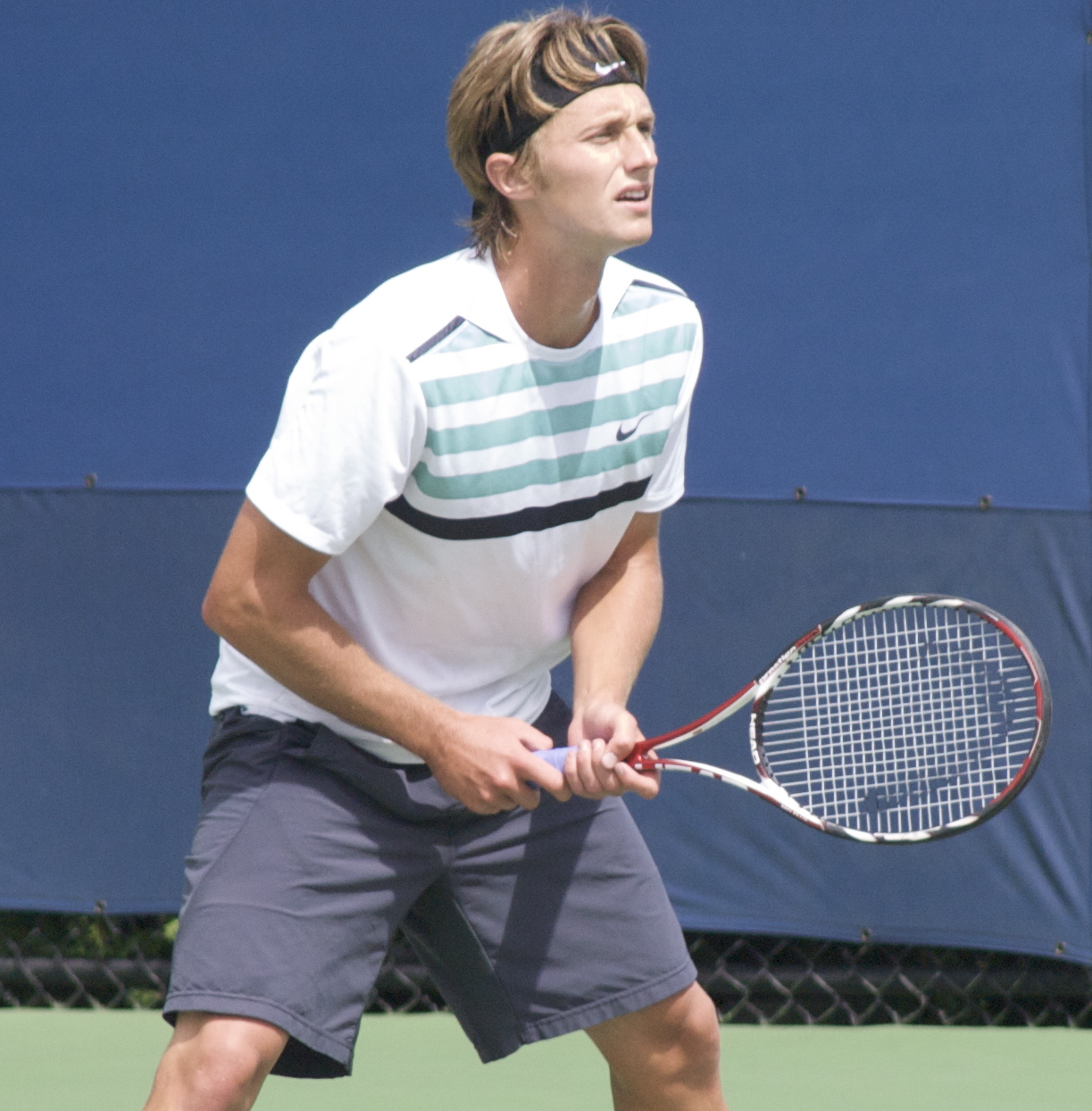
Peter Polansky

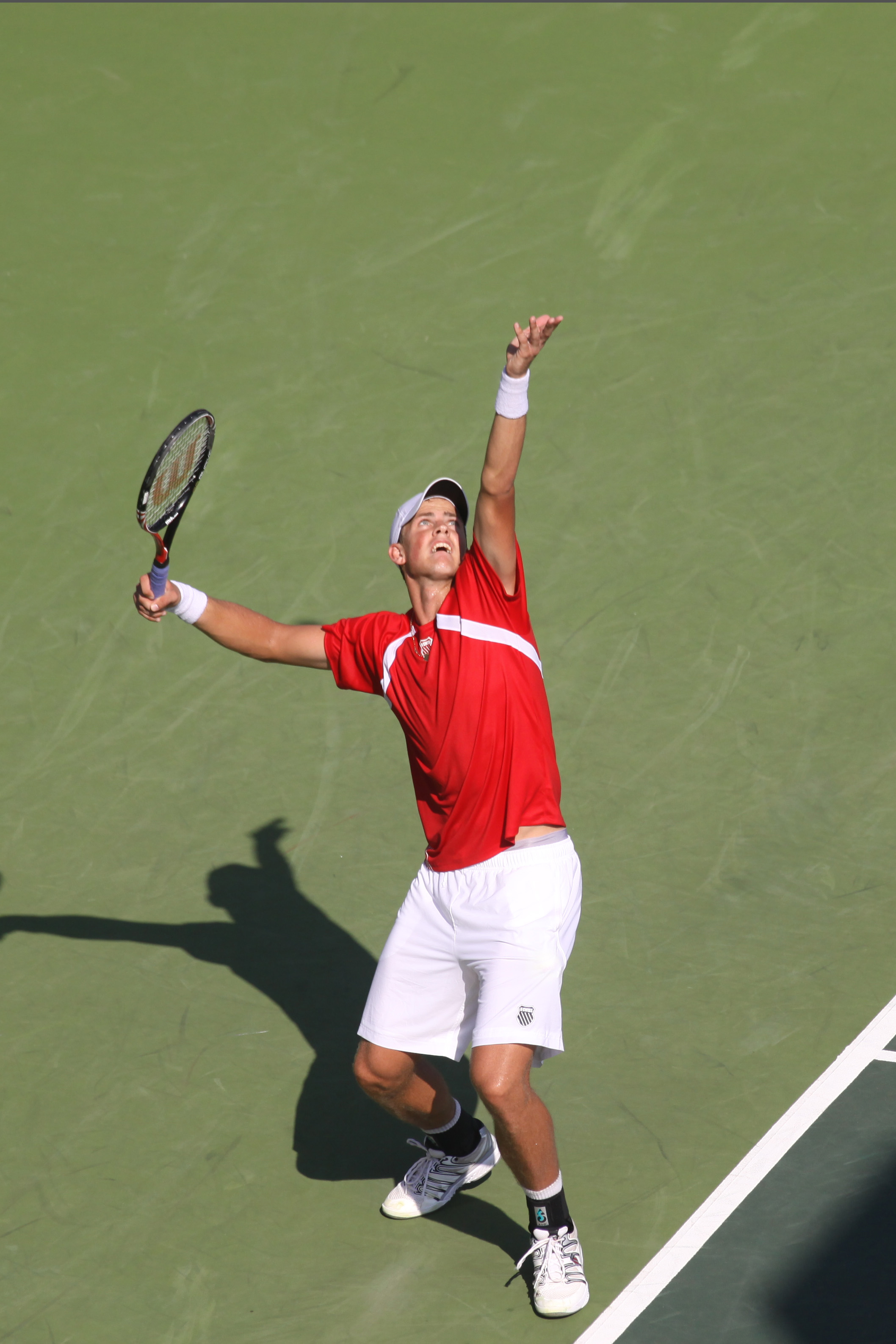
Vasek Pospisil

Name	Born	First	Last	Ties	Win/Loss		
Name	Born	First	Last	Ties	Sin	Dou	Tot
Bruno Agostinelli	April 1, 1987	2009	2009	1	1–1	0–0	1–1
**Félix Auger-Aliassime**	August 8, 2000	2019	2026	12	11–3	4–2	15–5
Tony Bardsley	February 9, 1945	1972	1975	7	4–6	3–2	7–8
Robert Bédard	September 13, 1931	1953	1967	16	8–15	3–7	11–22
Mike Belkin	June 29, 1945	1966	1973	12	14–7	3–5	17–12
Paul Bennett	—N/a	1921	1921	1	0–2	0–1	0–3
Philip Bester	October 6, 1988	2006	2016	4	2–3	0–1	2–4
Robert Bettauer	May 2, 1956	1979	1979	2	1–2	1–0	2–2
Stéphane Bonneau	December 8, 1961	1981	1985	3	2–3	0–1	2–4
James Boyce	June 22, 1951	1976	1976	2	2–0	0–1	2–1
Josef Brabenec	April 24, 1957	1979	1985	6	2–0	1–4	3–4
Peter Burwash	February 10, 1945	1970	1970	1	1–0	0–0	1–0
Douglas Cameron	—N/a	1938	1938	1	0–1	0–0	0–1
Keith Carpenter	August 3, 1941	1963	1968	7	1–4	1–6	2–10
**Duncan Chan**	July 29, 2005	2026	2026	1	0–0	0–1	0–1
Albert Chang	February 27, 1971	1995	1996	2	1–1	0–0	1–1
Grant Connell	November 17, 1965	1987	1997	21	8–3	15–6	23–9
William Cowan	April 28, 1959	1982	1984	4	1–0	0–4	1–4
Willard Crocker	—N/a	1923	1930	10	5–11	3–5	8–16
Frank Dancevic	September 26, 1984	2002	2016	24	15–21	3–1	18–22
**Gabriel Diallo**	September 24, 2001	2022	2026	11	7–6	0–1	7–7
Steven Diez	March 17, 1991	2010	2022	3	0–4	0–0	0–4
**Liam Draxl**	December 5, 2001	2025	2026	4	4–0	2–1	6–1
Henry Fauquier	August 28, 1942	1962	1969	8	1–8	2–4	3–12
Don Fontana	January 1, 1931	1955	1962	10	4–8	3–7	7–15
Harry Fritz	February 19, 1951	1982	1982	3	1–0	1–1	2–1
**Alexis Galarneau**	March 2, 1999	2022	2025	9	2–3	3–4	5–7
Réjean Genois	December 30, 1952	1973	1983	13	11–9	2–5	13–14
Reider Getz	—N/a	1964	1964	1	0–1	0–0	0–1
François Godbout	April 10, 1938	1959	1969	7	0–12	0–3	0–15
Mark Greenan	June 30, 1966	1985	1987	4	0–0	2–2	2–2
Brian Gyetko	January 26, 1968	1993	1993	1	0–0	0–1	0–1
Greg Halder	December 5, 1955	1976	1978	2	0–1	1–0	1–1
Bruce Hall	—N/a	1939	1939	1	0–2	0–0	0–2
Arthur Ham	—N/a	1928	1929	2	0–0	0–2	0–2
**Cleeve Harper**	December 24, 2000	2025	2026	2	1–0	1–1	2–1
George Holmes	—N/a	1921	1921	1	0–0	0–1	0–1
Matt Klinger	July 17, 1979	2003	2003	1	1–0	0–0	1–0
Bobby Kokavec	May 17, 1976	1998	1998	1	0–1	0–0	0–1
Henri Laframboise	—N/a	1921	1921	1	0–2	0–0	0–2
Pierre Lamarche	January 2, 1947	1974	1974	1	0–0	0–1	0–1
Edgar Lanthier	—N/a	1947	1947	1	0–0	0–1	0–1
Sébastien Lareau	April 27, 1973	1991	2001	20	17–16	11–3	28–19
Simon Larose	June 28, 1978	1999	2004	12	6–11	1–1	7–12
Martin Laurendeau	July 10, 1964	1987	1993	3	0–1	0–2	0–3
Sébastien Leblanc	December 27, 1973	1997	1997	1	1–0	0–0	1–0
Richard Legendre	January 19, 1953	1978	1978	1	0–0	0–1	0–1
Brendan Macken	January 21, 1923	1946	1954	10	6–8	1–5	7–13
James Macken	July 29, 1925	1948	1948	1	0–0	0–1	0–1
Gordon MacNeil	—N/a	1947	1947	1	0–0	0–1	0–1
Lorne Main	July 9, 1930	1949	1955	13	10–11	4–3	14–14
Walter Martin	—N/a	1934	1934	1	0–1	0–1	0–2
Donald McCormick	April 12, 1945	1973	1974	4	2–4	1–2	3–6
Donald McDiarmid	—N/a	1946	1946	1	0–1	0–0	0–1
Glenn Michibata	June 13, 1962	1982	1992	19	4–9	7–8	11–17
Bob Murray	—N/a	1938	1938	1	0–2	0–0	0–2
Daniel Nestor	September 4, 1972	1992	2018	52	15–15	33–13	48–28
Frédéric Niemeyer	April 24, 1976	1999	2009	18	9–11	13–2	22–13
Gilbert Nunns	June 30, 1907	1927	1934	4	2–4	0–0	2–4
Philip Pearson	—N/a	1939	1939	1	0–0	0–1	0–1
William Pedlar	—N/a	1939	1939	1	0–0	0–1	0–1
Filip Peliwo	January 30, 1994	2015	2015	1	0–2	0–0	0–2
John Picken	August 9, 1957	1978	1983	3	3–1	0–1	3–2
Peter Polansky	June 15, 1988	2007	2022	12	8–6	0–2	8–8
Vasek Pospisil	June 23, 1990	2008	2025	35	15–14	18–13	33–27
Robert Powell	April 11, 1881	1913	1914	4	2–3	2–2	4–5
Dale Power	January 1, 1949	1972	1979	7	6–2	2–2	8–4
Chris Pridham	April 11, 1965	1988	1990	4	3–3	0–0	3–3
Robert Puddicombe	—N/a	1966	1966	1	0–1	0–0	0–1
Marcel Rainville	June 30, 1903	1930	1934	6	1–6	0–5	1–11
Milos Raonic	December 27, 1990	2010	2023	13	17–5	2–1	19–6
Leroy Rennie	—N/a	1923	1923	1	0–2	0–0	0–2
Jocelyn Robichaud	April 8, 1978	1998	2001	4	1–0	1–2	2–2
George Robinson	—N/a	1950	1950	1	0–0	0–1	0–1
Henri Rochon	March 12, 1924	1946	1956	14	5–11	2–3	7–14
Brayden Schnur	July 4, 1995	2017	2022	4	0–3	0–3	0–6
Bernard Schwengers	May 26, 1880	1913	1914	4	3–4	2–2	5–6
Derek Segal	May 7, 1960	1984	1985	2	0–2	0–1	0–3
Adil Shamasdin	May 23, 1982	2015	2016	2	0–0	1–1	1–1
**Denis Shapovalov**	April 15, 1999	2016	2024	18	14–8	4–3	18–11
John Sharpe	October 1, 1945	1969	1971	5	3–7	2–3	5–10
Rob Steckley	February 16, 1980	2005	2006	3	1–2	0–0	1–2
Walter Stohlberg	—N/a	1948	1949	2	0–1	0–1	0–2
Andrew Sznajder	May 25, 1967	1987	1996	13	14–10	0–0	14–10
Ellis Tarshis	—N/a	1939	1939	1	1–1	0–0	1–1
Jerry Turek	April 2, 1975	2001	2001	1	0–0	1–0	1–0
Laird Watt	—N/a	1934	1946	3	0–1	0–2	0–3
Paul Willey	—N/a	1953	1958	8	3–4	1–3	4–7
Ross Wilson	—N/a	1938	1938	1	0–1	0–1	0–2
Martin Wostenholme	October 11, 1962	1981	1991	10	12–8	0–0	12–8
Jack Wright	November 11, 1901	1923	1933	14	6–20	3–11	9–31

*Active players in bold, statistics as of September 20, 2026
