= Tennis Canada =

Governing body of tennis in Canada

- Sport: Tennis
- Jurisdiction: National
- Abbreviation: TC
- Founded: 1890
- Affiliation: World Tennis
- Headquarters: Sobeys Stadium, Toronto and IGA Stadium, Montreal
- Chairman: Jennifer Bishop
- CEO: Michael S. Downey
- Sponsor: Sport Canada

Official website
- tenniscanada.com
- (Canada)

Tennis Canada is the national governing body of tennis within Canada. It works together with the provincial associations to organize tournaments and rules. They also oversee the Canada Davis Cup team and the Canada Fed Cup team. Tennis Canada was formed in 1890 and is a full member of World Tennis. Tennis Canada operates under the auspices of Sport Canada, and is a member of the Canadian Olympic Association. Tennis Canada’s event management team is directly responsible for all national and international competitions in Canada, including junior, senior and wheelchair championships.

== History ==
The Canadian Lawn Tennis Association (CLTA) was formed on July 1, 1890, in Toronto, Ontario. Delegates were present from at least thirteen clubs: six Toronto tennis clubs, including the Toronto Lawn Tennis Club; two clubs from Montreal, Quebec; and clubs from London, Ottawa, St. Catharines, Peterboro, and Petrolea, all in Ontario. Charles Smith Hyman, who won the Canadian Championships (later known as the Canadian Open) singles title five times in the 1880s, was chosen as its first president and served three one-year terms (1890–1892). The CLTA began organizing the Canadian Championships at the Toronto Lawn Tennis Club, starting with the 1890 tournament. They adopted the rules of the All England Lawn Tennis Club, the club which hosts Wimbledon. Beginning in 1894, the CLTA began organizing a junior championship for boys 18 years old and under.

In the first quarter century of its existence, two men served lengthy terms as president of the CLTA: Henry Gordon MacKenzie for eight years (1893–1900), and A. C. McMaster for thirteen years (1904–1916). The International Lawn Tennis Federation (ILTF) was formed in 1913, and the CLTA was invited to be a founding member but declined. In 1915, with many players fighting in World War I, the CLTA decided to suspend Canadian participation in the Davis Cup and also suspend the Canadian Championships. During the war, Canadian tournaments were suspended, except where "the entire proceeds were devoted to the Red Cross or other patriotic funds". In 1919, the CLTA resumed Canadian tournaments, but passed resolutions restricting Canadian players from competing "in tournaments authorized by Germans, Austrians, Turks, or Bulgarians" (i.e. Central Powers) and barring players from those nations from competing in Canadian tournaments. In 1920, Canada sought to return to Davis Cup play, but issued a late withdrawal citing an inability "to secure players of Davis Cup calibre".

Garnett H. Meldrum was president of the CLTA for twelve years (1922–1933). Meldrum, who had previously been a founding member of the Ontario Lawn Tennis Association, boosted the international prestige of the Canadian Championships and began moving the tournament around Canada. The 1931 tournament, for example, was held in Vancouver, British Columbia. In 1922, the CLTA began publishing a magazine, Canadian Lawn Tennis; the first issue included the complete rules governing Canadian tennis. By 1927, the CLTA had joined the ILTF. In 1928, Meldrum proposed that one junior boy from each province be sent to the Canadian Championships as a means of stimulating improvement in their game. At that time, there were 366 clubs and over 24,000 players affiliated with the CLTA. Robert N. Watt served as president for nine years (1937–1945), and later became the first Canadian president of the ILTF in 1957. In 1938, the CLTA formed a national player development commission.

During World War II, the CLTA suspended participation in the Davis Cup and also suspended the Canadian Championships. As during the first world war, war-benefit tournaments were held in Canada.

In 1975, Josef Brabenec Sr. was named the first Canadian national tennis coach. During his tenure, he designed national junior development and national coaching certification programs. In 1976, the CLTA began renting a four-acre (1.6 ha) site on the grounds of York University in Toronto for one dollar per year, for the purpose of building a million-dollar five-court tennis centre, to be the home of the Canadian Open tournament.

== Structure ==
The organizational membership is made up of ten provincial and two territorial associations: Tennis Alberta, Tennis BC, Tennis Manitoba, Tennis New Brunswick, Tennis Newfoundland & Labrador, Tennis Nova Scotia, Ontario Tennis Association, Tennis Prince Edward Island, Tennis Quebec, Tennis Saskatchewan, Tennis Yukon, and Tennis Northwest Territories.

As of 2017, the Chair of the Board is Derrick Rowe, while the President and Chief Executive Officer is Michael S. Downey. Directors include Marc Bibeau, Jennifer Bishop, Jack Graham (emeritus), Richard Harris, Sébastien Leblanc, Stephen Mandel, Nadir Mohamed and Mike Tevlin.

== Development ==
Tennis Canada operates a junior national training program through three centers: at IGA Stadium in Montreal; at Sobeys Stadium in Toronto; and at the North Shore Winter Club in Vancouver.

== Tournaments ==
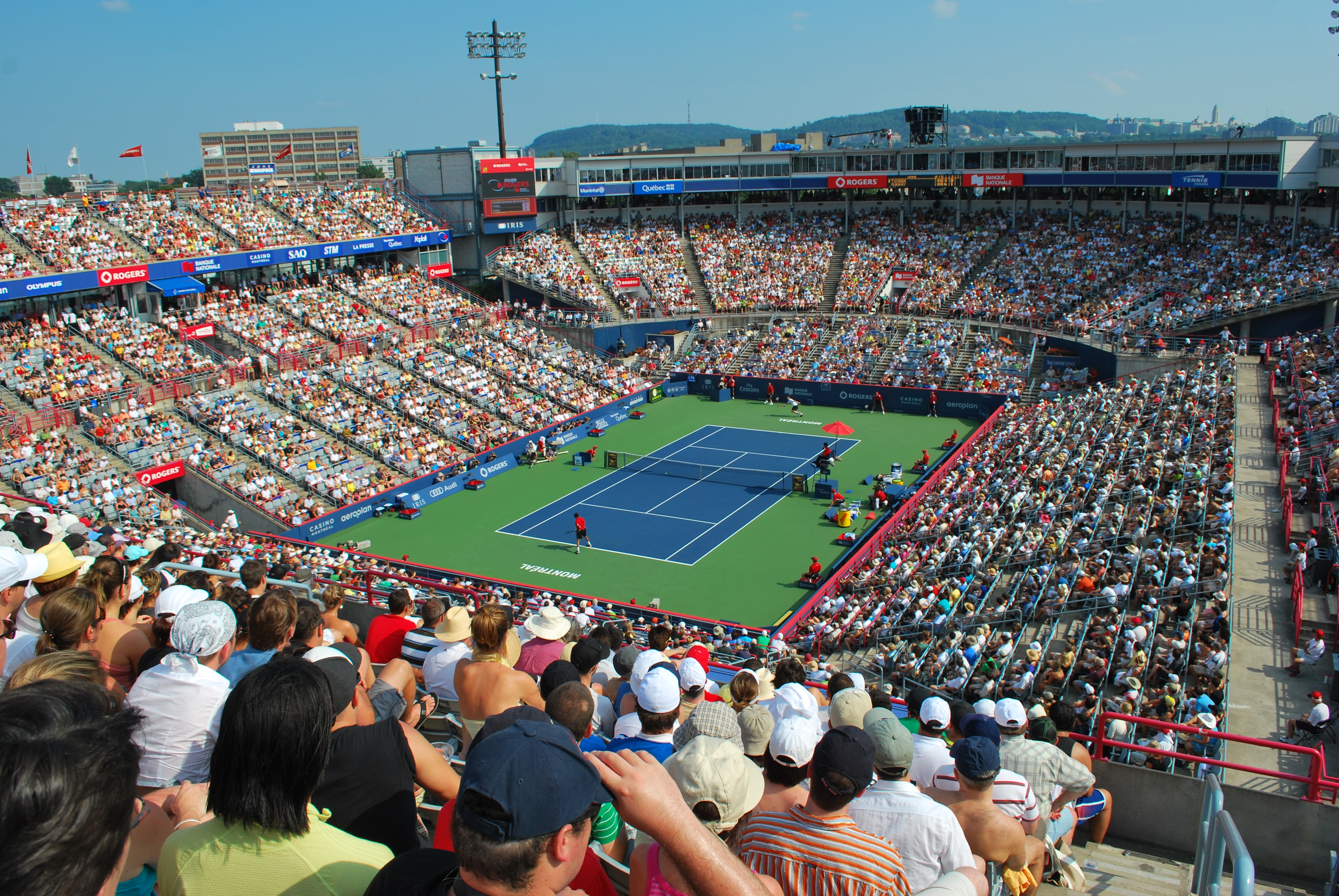
2009 Rogers Cup held at IGA Stadium

Tennis Canada owns and operates the Canadian Open (marketed as the National Bank Open Presented by Rogers since 2021), a joint men's and women's competition which attracts the top players in the world. For men, the Canadian Open is a Masters 1000 event on the Association of Tennis Professionals (ATP) tour; for women, it is a WTA 1000 event on the Women's Tennis Association (WTA) tour. In even-numbered years, the men's tournament is held in Montreal, while the women's tournament is held in Toronto, and vice versa in odd-numbered years.

Tennis Canada also owns and operates six ATP Challenger Tour tournaments in Drummondville, Winnipeg, Gatineau, Granby, Vancouver, and Calgary; and several lower-level World Tennis-sanctioned professional tournaments for men and women.

At the junior level, Tennis Canada operates eight junior national championships for Canadian juniors each year, including both indoor and outdoor events in four age categories: under-12, under-14, under-16, and under-18. They also host several World Tennis-sanctioned junior tournaments from Grade 1 (Note: World Tennis-sanctioned junior tournaments are graded. Grade A is the highest level, including junior Grand Slams and a few others. This is followed by Grade 1, Grade 2, Grade 3, Grade 4, and Grade 5 (the lowest level).) to Grade 5 open to international players. The largest of these is the Grade 1 level Canadian Open Junior Tennis Championships held in Repentigny, Quebec.

== International tennis ==
Tennis Canada is responsible for organizing Canadian teams for the Fed Cup, Davis Cup, Hopman Cup, the Olympics, and Paralympics.

== Hall of fame ==
=== Players ===
- Aleksandra Wozniak 2022
- Andrée Martin 1995
- Andrew Sznajder 2002
- Ann Barclay 1994
- B.P. Schwengers 1991
- Bob Murray 1994
- Brendan Macken 1991
- Carling Bassett-Seguso 1998
- Charles Hyman 1991
- Dale Power 2006
- Daniel Nestor 2018
- Delano Osborne 1991
- Don Fontana 2000
- Eleanor Young 1993
- Faye Urban 1996
- Florence Best 1995
- Gilbert Nunns 1995
- Glenn Michibata 1999
- Grant Connell 1998
- Harry Fauquier 1996
- Helen Kelesi 2002
- Henri Rochon 1991
- Isidore F. Hellmuth 1991
- Dr. Jack A. Wright 1991
- Jane O'Hara 2002
- Jill Hetherington Hultquist 2001
- Keith Carpenter 1996
- Laird Watt 1991
- Lois Moyes Bickle 1991
- Lorne Main 1991
- Louise Brown 1991
- Marcel Rainville 1993
- Marjorie Blackwood 1998
- Marjorie Leeming 1993
- Martin Wostenholme 2003
- Mike Belkin 1994
- Olive Wade 1993
- Patricia Hy-Boulais 2004
- R.B. Powell 1993
- Réjean Genois 1999
- Rene Simpson 2011
- Robert Bédard 1991
- Robert Watt 1991
- Sébastien Lareau 2005
- Sonya Jeyaseelan 2011
- Dr. Susan Butt 2000
- Vicki Berner 1995
- Violet Summerhayes 1991
- Walter Martin 2006
- Willard Crocker 1991

=== Builders ===
- Bob Moffatt 2015
- Bruce and Betty Birmingham 2020
- Doug Philpott 1993
- Eddie Condon 1993
- Hon. François Godbout 1996
- Frank Flanagan 1994
- Garnett Meldrum 1995
- Harold Milavsky 2009
- Harry Marpole 1994
- Jack Graham 2020
- Jacqueline Boutet C.M. 2003
- Jacques Hérisset 2001
- James Kirkpatrick 1994
- Jim Fleck O.C. 2004
- Jim Skelton 1994
- John Beddington 2006
- Josef Brabenec Sr. 2000
- Ken Sinclair 1996
- Klaus Bindhart 1996
- Lawrence Strong C.M. 1995
- Louis Cayer 2013
- Lucien Laverdure 1995
- Maurice Leclerc 2002
- Peter Dimmer 1993
- Pierre Lamarche 2004
- Richard Legendre 2007
- Ron Ghitter 2022
- Robert Wright 2000
- Roy Mansell 1994
- Tom Tebbutt 2022

=== Corporate Shield ===
- Paul Paré 2006
- Wilmat Tennyson 2006
