= 1977 Davis Cup Eastern Zone =

International tennis competition

The Eastern Zone was one of the three regional zones of the 1977 Davis Cup.

12 teams entered the Eastern Zone, with 8 teams competing in the preliminary round to join the previous year's semifinalists in the main draw. India and Indonesia received byes into the quarterfinals, while Australia and New Zealand received byes into the semifinals. The winner of the main draw went on to compete in the Inter-Zonal Zone against the winners of the Americas Zone and Europe Zone.

Australia defeated New Zealand in the final and progressed to the Inter-Zonal Zone.

== Preliminary rounds ==
=== Draw ===
First Round; 1–17 October 1976
Manila, Philippines
Philippines	4
Sri Lanka	0
Kuala Lumpur, Malaysia
Malaysia	1
Thailand	4
South Korea	w/o
Pakistan
Tokyo, Japan (hard)
Japan	5
Chinese Taipei	0

Qualifying Round; 12–14 November 1976
Philippines
Thailand	w/o
Seoul, South Korea
South Korea	2
Japan	3

=== First round ===
Philippines vs. Sri Lanka

Philippines
4
Manila, Philippines
October 1976

Sri Lanka
0

			1	2	3	4	5
1	(Philippines) (Sri Lanka)	Micky Dominguez; Everard de Silva	6; 1	6; 1	6; 2
2	(Philippines) (Sri Lanka)	Eduardo Cruz; Arjun Fernando	6; 1	6; 1	6; 4
3	(Philippines) (Sri Lanka)	Eduardo Cruz / Micky Dominguez; Everard de Silva / Arjun Fernando	6; 2	6; 3	6; 1
4	(Philippines) (Sri Lanka)	Alexander Marcial; Everard de Silva	6; 0	6; 1	6; 1
5	(Philippines) (Sri Lanka)	Romeo Rafon; Arjun Fernando	2; 1					not completed

Malaysia vs. Thailand

Malaysia
1
Kuala Lumpur, Malaysia
8–10 October 1976

Thailand
4

			1	2	3	4	5
1	(Malaysia) (Thailand)	Mohammed Akbar-Baba; Somparn Champisri	0; 6	2; 6	3; 6
2	(Malaysia) (Thailand)	Chiew Fook-chong; Chana Techasen	7; 5	4; 6	6; 3	6; 2
3	(Malaysia) (Thailand)	Mohammed Akbar-Baba / Chiew Fook-chong; Pichet Boratisa / Somparn Champisri	3; 6	5; 7	6; 8
4	(Malaysia) (Thailand)	Chiew Fook-chong; Somparn Champisri	4; 6	6; 8	3; 6
5	(Malaysia) (Thailand)	Roy Anchant; Prasert Khaimarn	3; 6	3; 6	3; 6

Japan vs. Chinese Taipei

Japan
5
Tokyo, Japan
15–17 October 1976
Hard

Chinese Taipei
0

			1	2	3	4	5
1	(Japan) (Chinese Taipei)	Jun Kamiwazumi; Tang Fu-shun	6; 4	6; 4	6; 2
2	(Japan) (Chinese Taipei)	Kenichi Hirai; Hsu Huang-jung	6; 3	6; 2	6; 3
3	(Japan) (Chinese Taipei)	Shigeyuki Nishio / Yuji Tezuka; Hsu Huang-jung / Tang Fu-shun	6; 3	6; 4	6; 4
4	(Japan) (Chinese Taipei)	Jun Kamiwazumi; Lin Chi-yuan	6; 1	6; 1	6; 4
5	(Japan) (Chinese Taipei)	Yuji Tezuka; Lin Den-wen	6; 1	6; 1	6; 2

=== Qualifying round ===
South Korea vs. Japan

South Korea
2
Seoul, South Korea
12–14 November 1976

Japan
3

			1	2	3	4	5
1	(South Korea) (Japan)	Choi Boo-kil; Jun Kamiwazumi	2; 6	1; 6	2; 6
2	(South Korea) (Japan)	Ju Chang-nam; Kenichi Hirai	4; 6	7; 5	3; 6	2; 6
3	(South Korea) (Japan)	Choi Boo-kil / Ju Chang-nam; Kenichi Hirai / Jun Kamiwazumi	6; 3	3; 6	4; 6	4; 6
4	(South Korea) (Japan)	Choi Boo-kil; Kiyoshi Tanabe	7; 5	6; 3	2; 6	2; 6	6; 2
5	(South Korea) (Japan)	Ju Chang-nam; Sachio Kato	6; 3	7; 5	6; 1

== Main draw ==
=== Draw ===
Quarterfinals; 2–12 December 1976
New Zealand
bye
Jakarta, Indonesia
Indonesia	5
Thailand	0
New Delhi, India
Japan	2
India	3
bye
Australia

Semifinals; 21–23 January
Auckland, New Zealand (grass)
New Zealand	5
Indonesia	0
Perth, Australia (grass)
India	0
Australia	5

Final; 11–13 February
Auckland, New Zealand (grass)
New Zealand	0
Australia	4

=== Quarterfinals ===
Indonesia vs. Thailand

Indonesia
5
Jakarta, Indonesia
10–12 December 1976

Thailand
0

			1	2	3	4	5
1	(Indonesia) (Thailand)	Gondo Widjojo; Chana Techasen	6; 1	6; 3	6; 3
2	(Indonesia) (Thailand)	Yustedjo Tarik; Somparn Champisri	6; 3	6; 4	3; 6	6; 0
3	(Indonesia) (Thailand)	Yustedjo Tarik / Gondo Widjojo; Somparn Champisri / Prasert Khaimarn	6; 3	6; 1	10; 8
4	(Indonesia) (Thailand)	Ludi Wijono; Prasert Khaimarn	7; 5	3; 6	8; 6	6; 1
5	(Indonesia) (Thailand)	Samudra Sangitan; Chana Techasen	6; 2	6; 4	6; 3

India vs. Japan

India
3
New Delhi, India
2–4 December 1976

Japan
2

			1	2	3	4	5
1	(India) (Japan)	Sashi Menon; Jun Kamiwazumi	6; 8	2; 6	6; 8
2	(India) (Japan)	Anand Amritraj; Kenichi Hirai	6; 2	3; 6	6; 1	7; 5
3	(India) (Japan)	Anand Amritraj / Vijay Amritraj; Kenichi Hirai / Jun Kamiwazumi	6; 3	6; 3	6; 2
4	(India) (Japan)	Sashi Menon; Kenichi Hirai	7; 5	6; 4	8; 10	5; 7	1; 6
5	(India) (Japan)	Anand Amritraj; Jun Kamiwazumi	8; 6	6; 1	6; 4

=== Semifinals ===
New Zealand vs. Indonesia

New Zealand
5
Stanley Street, Auckland, New Zealand
21–23 January 1977
Grass

Indonesia
0

			1	2	3	4	5
1	(New Zealand) (Indonesia)	Onny Parun; Atet Wijono	6; 4	6; 0	6; 4
2	(New Zealand) (Indonesia)	Brian Fairlie; Yustedjo Tarik	3; 6	6; 1	6; 2	2; 6	9; 7
3	(New Zealand) (Indonesia)	Brian Fairlie / Onny Parun; Gondo Widjojo / Atet Wijono	7; 5	6; 4	6; 2
4	(New Zealand) (Indonesia)	Chris Lewis; Yustedjo Tarik	6; 2	6; 2	6; 0
5	(New Zealand) (Indonesia)	Brian Fairlie; Atet Wijono	6; 3	6; 2	8; 6

Australia vs. India

Australia
5
Royal King's Park Tennis Club, Perth, Australia
21–23 January 1977
Grass

India
0

			1	2	3	4	5
1	(Australia) (India)	Mark Edmondson; Vijay Amritraj	6; 2	7; 5	2; 6	8; 6
2	(Australia) (India)	John Alexander; Anand Amritraj	6; 0	6; 2	6; 1
3	(Australia) (India)	John Alexander / Phil Dent; Anand Amritraj / Vijay Amritraj	6; 3	6; 2	6; 3
4	(Australia) (India)	Mark Edmondson; Anand Amritraj	6; 2	9; 7	10; 8
5	(Australia) (India)	Phil Dent; Sashi Menon	9; 7	11; 9	6; 4

=== Final ===
New Zealand vs. Australia

New Zealand
0
Stanley Street, Auckland, New Zealand
11–13 February 1977
Grass

Australia
4

			1	2	3	4	5
1	(New Zealand) (Australia)	Onny Parun; Mark Edmondson	3; 6	5; 7	7; 5	4; 6
2	(New Zealand) (Australia)	Brian Fairlie; John Alexander	3; 6	2; 6	3; 6
3	(New Zealand) (Australia)	Brian Fairlie / Onny Parun; John Alexander / Phil Dent	1; 6	6; 3	6; 4	1; 6	4; 6
4	(New Zealand) (Australia)	Onny Parun; John Alexander	11; 9	6; 4	4; 6	3; 6	4; 6
5	(New Zealand) (Australia)	Chris Lewis; Mark Edmondson	4; 6	6; 4	4; 6			not completed
