= Montreal Cup =

Defunct tennis tournament
- Tour: CLTA Circuit (1890); ILTF Circuit (1913-70)
- Founded: 1890; 135 years ago
- Abolished: 1970; 55 years ago
- Location: Montreal, Quebec, Canada
- Venue: Concordia LTC; McGill LTC; Monkland LTC; Mount Royal LTC; Outremont LTC
- Surface: Grass/Clay

The Montreal Cup also known as the Montreal Cup Tennis Championships was a men's and women's tennis tournament founded in 1890. It was last held at the Mount Royal Lawn Tennis Club, Montreal, Quebec, Canada. It ran annually as part of the CLTA Circuit from 1895 to 1912 then as part of ILTF Circuit from 1913 to 1970 when it was dropped from that circuit.

== History ==
In 1890 the first edition of the Montreal Cup was held at the McGill Lawn Tennis Club with McGill University the men's singles was won by C.F. Martin who defeated Cecil Wheatley Yarker. The tournament was not always held on a permanent basis until 1920. At the 1936 edition of the tournament Wimbledon champion Fred Perry played an exhibition singles and doubles event. the event was hosted a different venues including the Concordia Tennis Club, the Monkland Tennis Club, Mount Royal Lawn Tennis Club (f.1907), the Outremont Lawn Tennis Club, the University of Montreal courts, It ran annually as part of the CLTA Circuit from 1890 then as part of ILTF Circuit from 1913 to 1970 when it was dropped from that circuit.

== Finals ==
=== Men's singles ===
(incomplete roll)

Year	Winners	Runners-up	Score
1890	(Canada) C.F. Martin	(Canada) Cecil Wheatley Yarker	6-1, 6–2, 6–3.
1908	(Canada) Thomas Yeo Sherwell	(Canada) Hedley Massey Suckling	?
1920	(Canada) William Leroy Rennie	(Canada) Arthur John Veysey	4-6, 6–4, 6–3, 6–2.
1921	(Canada) Jack A. Wright	(Canada) Leon De Turenne	6–4, 6–3, 6–0.
1923	(Canada) Jack A. Wright (2)	(Canada) Willard Frederick Crocker	6–2, 6–4, 6–1.
1936	(Canada) Bob Murray	(Canada) Roger Durivage	6–2, 4–6, 6–3, 4–2, retd.
1939	(Canada) Malcolm Laird Watt	(Canada) Roger Durivage	6–2, 6–0, 6–0.
1940	(Canada) Malcolm Laird Watt (2)	(Canada) Louis MacAdam Duff	6–4, 6–0, 6–0.
1951	(Canada) Jack Spencer	(Canada) Jean Richer	6–1, 6–4, 6–4.
1952	(Canada) Robert Bedard	(Canada) Jack Spencer	?
1962	(Canada) Val Harit	(Canada) Roland Godin	6–0, 6–2, 6–1.
1969	(Canada) Robert Bedard	(Canada) Mike Belkin	6–3, 6–3, 6–3.

=== Men's doubles ===
(incomplete roll)

Year	Winners	Runners-up	Score
1936	(Canada) Malcolm Laird Watt (Canada) Bob Murray	(Canada) Charlie Leslie (Canada) Dave Morrice	6–2, 9–11, 2–6, 9–7, 6–4.
1951	(Canada) Malcolm Laird Watt (2) (Canada) George Morrison	(Canada) Gordie MacNeil (Canada) Edgar Lanthier	6–3, 3–6, 6–4, 3–6, 8–6.

=== Women's singles ===
(incomplete roll)

Year	Winners	Runners-up	Score
1939	(Canada) Simone Bernadete	(Canada) Rene Bolte	4–6, 6–3, 7–5.
1940	(Canada) Pauline Bolte	(Canada) Françoise Lacasse	6–2, 6–4.
1951	(Canada) Patrica Macken	(Canada) Mariette Laframboise	6–3, 6–4.

=== Women's doubles ===
(incomplete roll)

Year	Winners	Runners-up	Score
1940	(Canada) Pauline Bolte (Canada) Françoise Lacasse	(Canada) Mariette Boivin (Canada) Mrs A.R. Porte	6–4, 4–6, 6–4.
1951	(Canada) Patrica Macken (Canada) Kae Otton	(Canada) Joyce Smallwood (Canada) Mary Lang	10–8, 6–4.
