= Rob Steckley =

Canadian tennis player

- Full name: Robert Steckley
- Country (sports): Canada
- Born: 16 February 1980 (age 46) Toronto, Canada
- Plays: Right-handed
- Prize money: $29,301

Singles
- Career record: 1–3 (ATP Tour & Davis Cup)
- Highest ranking: No. 464 (13 Nov 2006)

Doubles
- Highest ranking: No. 610 (17 Jul 2006)

Robert Steckley (born 16 February 1980) is a Canadian former professional tennis player.

Steckley, who had a best singles ranking of 464, made his only ATP Tour main draw appearance as a wildcard at the 2005 Rogers Cup, a Masters tournament in Montreal, where he lost his first round match in three sets to Kenneth Carlsen. He won an ITF Futures title at Rockhampton in 2006.

A member of the Canada Davis Cup team in 2005 and 2006, Steckley played in three singles rubbers. On debut in 2005 he defeated Daniel Vallverdú of Venezuela, but lost both his matches in 2006, one of which was through a retirement.

Steckely has coached several players on tour, including Lucie Šafářová and Denis Shapovalov.

== ITF Futures titles ==
=== Singles: (1) ===
No.	Date	Tournament	Surface	Opponent	Score
1.	Sep 2006	Australia F7, Rockhampton	Hard	(Australia) Adam Feeney	7-5, 6–3

=== Doubles: (1) ===
No.	Date	Tournament	Surface	Partner	Opponents	Score
1.	Feb 2005	USA F4, Brownsville	Hard	(United States) Lester Cook	(United States) Tres Davis (United States) Eric Nunez	w/o

== See also ==
- List of Canada Davis Cup team representatives
