= Jim Boyce (tennis) =

Canadian tennis player

- Full name: James N. Boyce
- Country (sports): Canada
- Born: June 22, 1951 (age 75)
- Plays: Right-handed

Singles
- Career record: 18-29
- Career titles: 3

Doubles
- Career record: 0–6 (ATP Tour & Davis Cup)

James N. Boyce (born June 22, 1951) is the former president and CEO of the Ontario Tennis Association for 26 years and former Canadian No. 1 tennis player.

== Career ==
A native of Toronto, Ontario, Boyce's journey commenced as the captain of the Canadian team at the Junior World Championships. During this period, he clinched five national junior championships titles and earned the coveted "Pepsi-Cola Outstanding Canadian Junior Award" for three consecutive years.

Boyce was active on tour in the 1970s and captained Mississippi State University in varsity tennis 1971-1973. Boyce was also All-SEC (Southeastern Conference) and an SEC first-team honoree 1970-1973.

Boyce won the Western Ontario Open in August 1970 at the Waterloo Tennis Club in Waterloo, Ontario against a field of U.S. players, defeating defending champion Jon Hainline in the quarterfinal, Jim Swift in the semifinal and Les Dodson (winner of the Michigan State Championships the following season) in the final.

In 1971, Boyce was runner-up at the Canadian National Championships (closed) to Peter Burwash.

He won the Sarasota Open on clay in 1973, defeating American Steve Miller in the final.

Boyce won the Canadian National Championships (closed) in both singles and doubles in 1976, gaining the Canadian No. 1 ranking as a result.

He featured in the 1977 Davis Cup (held in late 1976), playing ties against the Caribbean and Mexico with a record of 2-0 in singles.

He served as the Head Pro and later General Manager at the All-Season Racquets Club in Ottawa. He was selected as the Chair of the 1980 Davis Cup Tie by Tennis Canada.

He served as treasurer of the Toronto Tennis League and played a vital role in initiatives like the Doug Philpott Inner-City Children’s Fund.

From 1997, he served as president and CEO of the Ontario Tennis Association.

== See also ==
- List of Canada Davis Cup team representatives
