= Laird Watt =

Canadian tennis player (1913–2001)

- Full name: Malcolm Laird Watt
- Country (sports): Canada
- Born: May 21, 1913; Montreal, Quebec
- Died: May 3, 2001 (aged 87); Montreal, Quebec
- Plays: Right-handed

Singles

Grand Slam singles results
- Wimbledon: 1R (1935, 1936)
- US Open: 3R (1935)

Malcolm Laird Watt (May 21, 1913 – May 3, 2001) was a Canadian tennis player.

Watt, born in Montreal, Quebec, was the son of tennis player Robert N. Watt, who in the late 1950s became the first Canadian president of the International Lawn Tennis Association. He was educated at McGill University and captained the tennis team, leading them to the intercollegiate team championship title.

After graduating in 1934, Watt he competed on tour and featured twice at Wimbledon. In 1935 he made the singles third round of the U.S. National Championships. He was Canada's number one ranked player in 1938 and 1939. He won the Montreal Cup two times in 1939 and 1940. His Davis Cup career for Canada spanned 1934 to 1946, but the team didn't compete every year and he featured in three campaigns. The last, in 1946, was as playing captain. He continued in 1947 as non playing captain of the team.

Watt went into the administrative side of tennis like his father and served as president of the Canadian Lawn Tennis Association from 1962 to 1963. In 1970 he was appointed governor of McGill University. He is a 1991 inductee into the Canadian Tennis Hall of Fame and in 2002 was inducted into the McGill Sports Hall of Fame.

== See also ==
- List of Canada Davis Cup team representatives
