= Walter Stohlberg =

Canadian tennis player

- Full name: Walter Arthur Stohlberg
- Country (sports): Canada
- Born: 1922 or 1923
- Died: August 12, 1977 (aged 54)
- Plays: Right-handed

Singles
- Career record: 0–1 (Davis Cup)

Doubles
- Career record: 0–1 (Davis Cup)

Walter Arthur Stohlberg was a Canadian tennis player of the 1940s and 1950s.

Stohlberg, a graduate of Kitsilano High School in Vancouver, served as a Bombardier with the Royal Canadian Air Force during World War II. He became a German prisoner of war in 1944 and was held at Stalag Luft III.

Post war, Stohlberg was a Canadian Davis Cup representative twice, featuring in ties against Mexico in 1948 and Australia in 1949. He was a doubles runner-up at the 1949 Canadian Championships, with Lorne Main. In 1952 he had to retire from amateur tennis in order to accept a paid coaching position.

== See also ==
- List of Canada Davis Cup team representatives
