= Réjean Genois =

Canadian tennis player (born 1952)

- Country (sports): Canada
- Born: December 30, 1952 (age 72) Quebec City, Quebec
- Height: 5 ft 9 in (175 cm)
- Plays: Right-handed

Singles
- Career record: 7–22
- Highest ranking: No. 89 (July 31, 1978)

Grand Slam singles results
- French Open: 1R (1979)
- Wimbledon: 1R (1979)
- US Open: 3R (1978)

Doubles
- Career record: 3–14
- Highest ranking: No. 130 (January 3, 1979)

Grand Slam doubles results
- US Open: 2R (1978)

Réjean Genois (born December 30, 1952) is a former professional and Davis Cup tennis player from Quebec City. Genois was the top-ranked Canadian singles player during 1978 and 1979. His career high ranking of World No. 89 was the highest grand prix tour computer ranking for a Canadian until Glenn Michibata reached World No. 79 in 1984.

== Collegiate tennis ==
Genois played tennis at Florida State University from 1972 until 1974.

== Tour results ==
=== 1972 ===
Genois lost in the second round of the 1972 Canadian Open to Czechoslovak Jan Kukal 3–6, 0–6, after having had a first round bye. In doubles he and compatriot Dale Power likewise lost in the second round after a bye.

=== 1973 ===
Genois played in the main draw of one tour event in 1973, the Quebec Grand Prix in October. He lost handily in the first round in singles to New Zealander Onny Parun 2–6, 1–6. In doubles Genois and partner Richard Legendre, fellow Quebecer and Canadian Davis Cupper, fell in straight sets in the first round to the top-seeded pairing of Jimmy Connors and Marty Riessen.

=== 1974 ===
Genois competed in two event main draws in 1974. In February he competed at the WCT Toronto and lost in the first round to American Erik van Dillen 2–6, 2–6. In doubles he and partner Canadian C. Burr lost in the first round as well.

In August, Genois played the Canadian Open for a second time and won his first ever tour match, as he and partner Pierre Lamarche, another Quebecer and Davis Cup player, won their first round match, 6–2, 6–3, over Jeff Borowiak and Jim McManus. In the second round they fell to Manuel Orantes and Guillermo Vilas 2 and 3. In singles, Genois was again soundly beaten, this time by Mexican Joaquín Loyo Mayo 2–6, 0–6.

=== 1975 ===
Genois played in just one main draw in 1975, the Canadian Open for a third time. In addition, on March 5 however, he received his first computer ranking, at World No. 355 in singles, which put him Canada No. 4. By April 30 he was the country's fifth highest-ranked player. Genois competed just in singles in Montreal and did not fare well, losing to No. 7 seed American Harold Solomon 0–6, 1–6.

=== 1976 ===
Genois defaulted in his first round match to Ilie Năstase at the Salisbury Grand Prix, played in February indoors on carpet in Salisbury, Maryland. (Nastase went on to win the title.) His ranking improved slightly - on June 14 he became World No. 326 and Canada No. 3 (in singles - doubles rankings were not kept then).

For the fourth time Genois fell in the first round of the Canadian Open, this time to Australian Geoff Masters 2–6, 5–7. He played doubles again too, losing in the first round partnering compatriot and fellow Davis Cupper Dale Power.

=== 1977 ===
Genois competed in singles at the Taipei Grand Prix and won his first set in a tour match as he fell to American Chris Delaney 7–5, 5–7, 4–6. He also played in a grand slam event for the first time, competing in doubles at the U.S. Open. He and partner Guillermo Oropez lost 2 and 1 in the first round to the legendary doubles pair of Bob Hewitt and Frew McMillan.

Despite never having won a tour singles event, remarkably, Genois was ranked World No. 184 on Dec 31, 1977, putting him at Canada No. 2. The only Canadian ranked higher was Greg Halder, at No. 127.

=== 1978 ===
Genois had his best tour results by some margin in 1978. He played in the newly formed challenger tour, reaching the semi-final of the third ever challenger tournament, and first American one, in Shreveport. He and partner Ramiro Benavides, of Bolivia, won the doubles title. The following week at the Birmingham Challenger Genois reached the third round in the singles event. The week after the Asheville Challenger was held with Réjean reaching the second round in singles and taking the title in doubles, again partnering Benavides.

The following week Genois, according to the ATP's results archives, played in the Raleigh Challenger and Cincinnati Grand Prix events simultaneously, reaching the second round in both. He scored his first ever win in a grand prix event over American Keith Richardson, 7–6, 7–6. He lost in the second round to Pat DuPré in three sets. Genois also reached the second round in doubles partnering Frenchman Christophe Freyss. In rankings released on July 12, Genois was listed as World No. 115 and Canada No. 1. He continued his good run reaching the quarter-finals of the Virginia Beach Challenger held two weeks later. In doubles he and partner Bernard Fritz lost in the first round. Genois reached his career high ranking of World No. 89 at the end of July.

In following two challengers however, Genois lost in the first round in singles however. At the Wall Challenger (in Wall, New Jersey) he and partner Johan Kriek managed to reach the quarter-finals. Genois turned matters around somewhat winning his first ever singles match at the Canadian Open, as he defeated Briton Robin Drysdale 6–4, 6–0. In the second he lost to eventual champion and top seed Eddie Dibbs, 2–6, 4–6. In doubles, he and compatriot Harry Fritz lost in straight sets in the first round.

Genois had his best tour tournament result at the 1978 U.S. Open, reaching the third round. In doing so, Genois defeated No. 10 seed Sandy Mayer in the first round, 7–6, 6–2, and Colombian Álvaro Betancur in the second, 6–2, 6–3. He fell to Johan Kriek in the third 2–6, 6–7.

Genois played in two further challenger events in the autumn, reaching the second round of the Tinton Falls Challenger in late September and the quarter-finals of the Tel Aviv Challenger in middle October. In doubles at Tinton Falls he and partner Legendre reached the second round, while in Tel Aviv Génois and fellow Canadian Dale Power likewise reached the second round. Genois finished the year World No. 121 (in singles).

=== 1979 ===
Genois played in this first main draw for the year in early May at the Raleigh Challenger on clay, and did well reaching the third round in singles. In singles, he and partner Richard Legendre lost in the first round however. He next, two weeks later, saw action in the French Open where he went out in the opening round to No. 10 seed Brian Gottfried in straight sets. He was to be his only main draw appearance at Roland Garros.

In June Genois lost in the first round in both singles, to Stefan Simonsson, 5–7, 6–7, and in doubles, partnering Legendre, at Brussels Outdoor Grand Prix. The following week he again lost in the first round in singles, again on clay, at the Berlin Grand Prix, to Javier Soler, 1–6, 2–6. The week after he appeared, for his only time, in the main draw at Wimbledon. As in Paris the previous month, the experience lasted only briefly as Réjean was defeated by Robert Lutz, 3–6, 2–6, 2–6.

In July back in North America, Genois continued his losing streak going down to lucky loser entrant Juan Núñez, 1–6, 6–4, 4–6. Two weeks later at the Louisville Grand Prix, he finally got off the snide in beating Erick Iskersky, 6–4, 2–6, 7–5. In the second round he lost however to Deon Joubert without winning a single game. In doubles, he and partner Steve Krulevitz lost in the first round. The following month at the Canadian Open, Réjean battled well in the first set before succumbing to No. 13 seed Brian Teacher, 6–7, 0–6. The following week the poor results continued as he went out in the opening round U.S. Pro Tennis Championships in Boston on Har-Tru clay, to qualifier Jai DiLouie 3–6, 3–6.

The following month Genois competed in what turned out to be his final main draw for the year at the Charlotte Challenger and fared well, reaching the quarter-finals in singles and the semis, partnering Ramiro Benavides, in doubles. He finished 1979 ranked World No. 186 in singles.

=== 1980 ===
Genois competed in one event in a main draw, the San Luis Potosí Challenger in April. Losing in the first round in singles, he captured the doubles title, partnering Mike Barr. It turned out to be his last doubles tour event that he played in.

=== 1982 ===
Genois made one final appearance at the Canadian Open in 1982, losing his first round match to Juan Avendaño, 2–6, 4–6.

== Davis Cup ==
Genois had a career Davis Cup win–loss record of 13 and 14 in 13 ties for Canada, between 1973 and 1983, including going 11-9 in singles. The highlight of his play was in 1982 when Canada was one tie win away from gaining promotion to the World Group. Canada defeated Venezuela away and Colombia at home to set up a home encounter versus Paraguay. Played in Laval, Glenn Michibata narrowly lost the opening rubber, going down to former World top ten player Víctor Pecci in five sets. This set up a singles encounter between Genois and veteran, former World top fifty player, Francisco González. The diminutive Quebecer fell to the tall Paraguayan in straight sets sadly. The following day Paraguay took the doubles match to seal victory.

== Honours ==
Genois was inducted in the Tennis Canada Hall of Fame in 1999.

== Post tour tennis career ==
Genois is the current president of Tennis Québec.
