= Sebti Bounaib =

Algerian tennis player

- Country (sports): Algeria
- Born: 13 December 1949 (age 75); Constantine, Algeria
- Plays: Right-handed

Singles
- Career record: 0-1
- Career titles: 0

Grand Slam singles results
- French Open: Q2 (1974)

Doubles
- Career record: 0-1
- Career titles: 0
Medal record
Mediterranean Games
Bronze medal – third place	1975 Algiers	Doubles

Sebti Bounaib is a former professional tennis player who competed for Algeria.

== Career ==
Bounaib played in one Davis Cup tie for Algeria in 1976 and lost both of his rubbers.
