= Pierre Lamarche =

Canadian tennis player and coach

- Country (sports): Canada
- Born: January 2, 1947 (age 78)

Singles
- Career record: 0–4 (ATP Tour & Davis Cup)

Doubles
- Career record: 1–5 (ATP Tour & Davis Cup)

Pierre Lamarche (born January 2, 1947) is a Canadian former tennis player and coach.

Raised in Montreal, Quebec, Lamarche played collegiate tennis in the United States for Mississippi State University and was known for having a fiery on court persona. He made a solitary Davis Cup appearance for Canada in 1974, featuring in the doubles rubber of a tie against Mexico in his home province, which he and Réjean Genois lost to Raúl Ramírez and Vicente Zarazúa. From 1991 to 1996 he served as the team's non playing captain and steered the Canadians into the World Group for the first time. He founded tennis academy Ace Tennis in Burlington, Ontario and in 2004 was inducted into the Tennis Canada Hall of Fame for his contributions as a coach.

== See also ==
- List of Canada Davis Cup team representatives
