= Abdeslam Mahmoudi =

Algerian tennis player

- Country (sports): Algeria
- Born: 30 December 1935 Constantine, Algeria
- Died: 16 February 2018 (aged 82) Algiers, Algeria

Singles
- Career record: 0–4
- Career titles: 0

Grand Slam singles results
- French Open: Q1 (1975)

Doubles
- Career record: 0–2
- Career titles: 0
Medal record
Mediterranean Games
Bronze medal – third place	1975 Algiers	Singles
Bronze medal – third place	1975 Algiers	Doubles

Abdeslam Mahmoudi (30 December 1935 – 16 February 2018) was an Algerian professional tennis player.

Mahmoudi played in two Davis Cup ties for Algeria in 1977 and 1978 and won one of his six rubbers.

Two of his sons, Mohammed and Noureddine, followed his steps and also played tennis professionally.
