= Daniel Vallverdú =

Venezuelan tennis coach and a former professional player

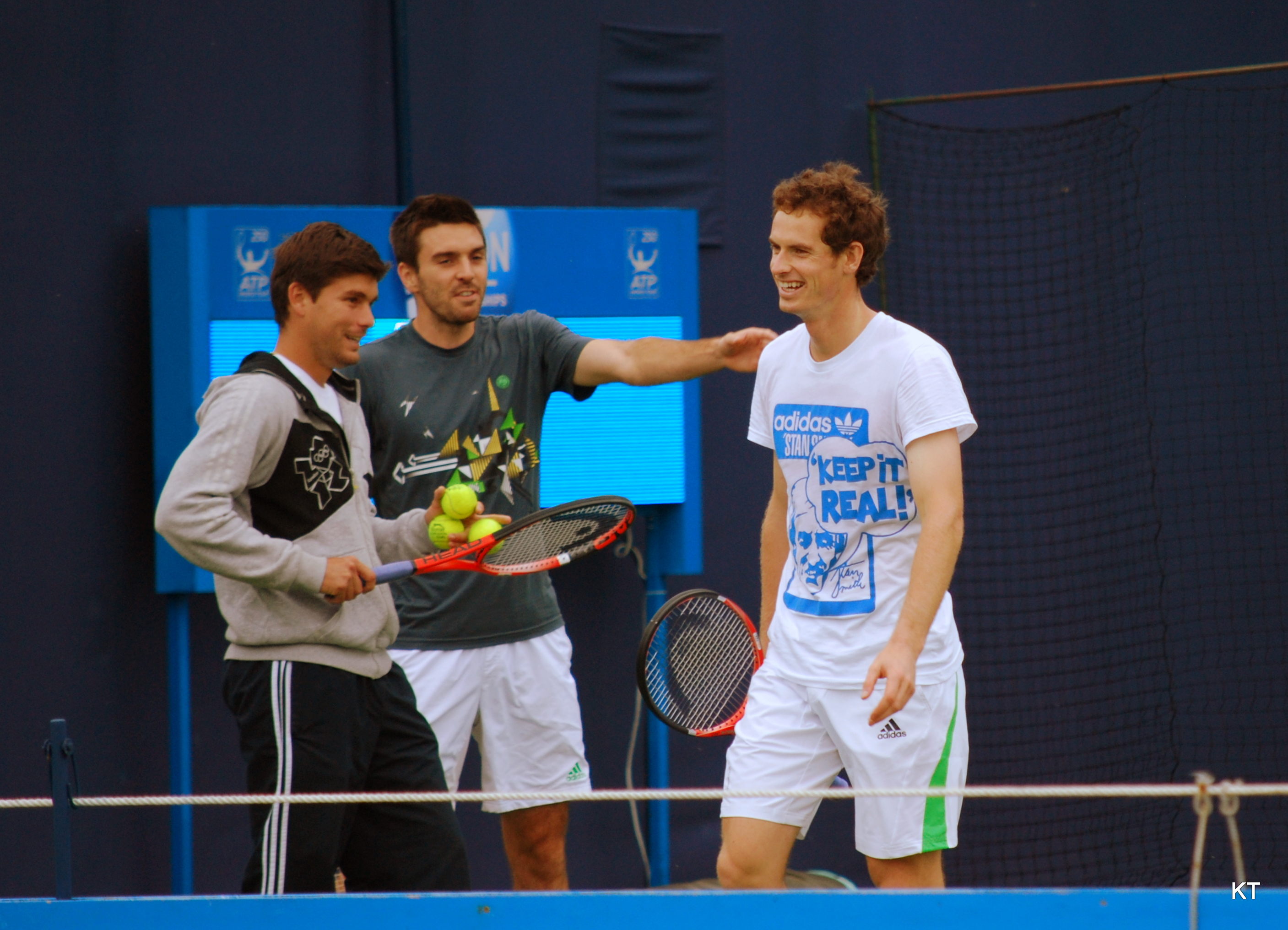
- Daniel Vallverdú (left) in 2011
- Country (sports): Venezuela
- Residence: London, United Kingdom
- Born: March 17, 1986 (age 40) Valencia, Venezuela
- Height: 1.80 m (5 ft 11 in)
- Turned pro: 2004
- Plays: Right-handed (two-handed backhand)
- College: University of Miami

Singles
- Career record: 2-5
- Career titles: 0
- Highest ranking: No. 727 (August 8, 2005)

Doubles
- Career record: 4-2
- Career titles: 0
- Highest ranking: No. 746 (August 15, 2005)

Team competitions
- Davis Cup: SF^{Am} (2005)

Daniel Vallverdú (born March 17, 1986), also known as Dani Vallverdú, is a Venezuelan tennis coach having coached Andy Murray (2010–2014), Tomáš Berdych (2014–2016), Juan Martín del Potro, Stan Wawrinka (2019–2022) and most recently Grigor Dimitrov (2016–2019, 2022–2025). Vallverdu has also worked alongside Ivan Lendl, Andre Agassi, Magnus Norman and Jamie Delgado.

Vallverdu is the tournament director of the Washington Mubadala Citi DC Open, a joint ATP and WTA tournament and a strategic adviser to the Saudi Tennis Federation and the co-tournament director for the WTA Finals in Riyadh, Saudi Arabia.

Vallverdu is also the cofounder of AD Global Sports, a company promoting the growth of sports in the UK and around the world. In November 2023, AD Global Sports, together with Andy Murray acquired the Padel Team AD/vantage part of the Hexagon Cup which took place in Madrid in February 2024.

== Coaching career ==
Vallverdú has formerly coached Andy Murray (2010–2014), Tomáš Berdych (2014–2016), Juan Martín del Potro, Stan Wawrinka (2019–2022) and most recently Grigor Dimitrov (2016–2019, 2022–2025). Vallverdu has also worked alongside Ivan Lendl, Andre Agassi, Magnus Norman and Jamie Delgado.

Vallverdú and Murray's partnership led to many tournament wins, including Murray's first Olympic Gold medal in 2012 (Vallverdú was head coach for the British Olympic tennis team), and two Grand Slam wins: the 2012 US Open and 2013 Wimbledon Championships.

Under Vallverdú's guidance in May 2015, at the age of 29, Czech player Tomáš Berdych reached his highest career singles ranking of No. 4 in the ATP rankings.

He became the coach of Grigor Dimitrov in July 2016. At the time the Bulgarian was No. 40 in the ATP rankings. Vallverdú guided him to his first Masters 1000 title at the 2017 Cincinnati Masters, followed by the ATP Finals title in November 2017, resulting in Dimitrov's career high ranking of No. 3 by the end of 2017. In May 2019, Dimitrov and Vallverdú ended their working relationship.

In June 2019, Vallverdú joined Stan Wawrinka as his coach, together with Magnus Norman. Wawrinka ended 2019 back in the top 20 of the ATP rankings. Norman and Wawrinka parted ways in September 2020. Vallverdu and Wawrinka ended their working relationship in October 2022.

In December 2022 Vallverdu agreed to start coaching Grigor Dimitrov again. By April 2024, Dimitrov joined again the top 10 and finished the year at world No. 10. They split for a second time in December 2025.

=== Coaching history ===
==== Andy Murray ====
Vallverdú met British tennis player Andy Murray in the Sánchez-Casal Barcelona Tennis Academy when he was 15, where they were both training to become professional tennis players. The two became close friends.

In June 2008, Vallverdú became Murray's doubles partner for the 2008 Queen's Club Championships in London.

Vallverdú started working with Murray following his split with Miles Maclagan in 2010 and became Murray's de facto coach after he parted company with Alex Corretja in March. He coached Murray, organised practice sessions and served as liaison with Darren Cahill and Sven Groeneveld. "Quiet and unassuming, Vallverdú scouts opponents and helps devise tactical plans. Despite his relative youth, he is known for his professionalism and in-depth knowledge of the game."

Vallverdú was also selected to be the head coach of the British men's tennis team for the London Olympics 2012, in which Murray won the Gold medal.

With Andy Murray, Vallverdú worked alongside Ivan Lendl, who joined Murray's team in 2012.

Other memorable highlights of his coaching work with Murray and Lendl included when Murray won two Grand Slam titles, the US Open in 2012 and Wimbledon 2013. Following a mutual split with Murray in November 2014, Vallverdú took on the head coaching job for Tomáš Berdych.

==== Tomáš Berdych ====
Vallverdu started working with Tomáš Berdych following the mutual split from Andy Murray in November 2014. At the time Tomáš Berdych was ranked World No. 7. It was an immediate success as Tomáš Berdych reached his second Australian Open semifinal after beating Rafael Nadal, but then losing to Andy Murray in a tense match 6–7(6–8) 6–0 6–3 7–5.

Under Vallverdú's guidance in May 2015, at the age of 29, Berdych reached his highest career singles ranking of No. 4 in the ATP rankings and entered Roland Garros as the fourth seed. On 16 May 2016, Berdych and Vallverdú parted their ways.

==== Grigor Dimitrov ====
In July 2016, he became the coach of Grigor Dimitrov. At the time the Bulgarian was No. 40 in the ATP rankings. Vallverdú guided him to his first Masters 1000 Win, as he beat Nick Kyrgios in the final of the 2017 Cincinnati Masters. This success was followed by the ATP Finals title for Dimitrov in November 2017, resulting in a career high ranking of No. 3 by the end of 2017. On 7 May 2019, after three years, Dimitrov and Vallverdú ended their working relationship.

In October 2022 after parting ways with Wawrinka, Vallverdu agreed to coach Dimitrov again till the end of the 2022 season which ended in November 2022. On 1 December 2022, it was confirmed he will continue to coach Dimitrov in 2023.

Dimitrov under Vallverdu’s guidance made his first ATP Final since the 2018 ABN AMRO in Rotterdam at the 2023 Geneva Open. Dimitrov also reached the fourth round at the 2023 Wimbledon Championships. At the 2023 US Open Dimitrov beat Andy Murray in straight sets to advance to the third round during the second-round match. Dimitrov had both of his coaches Vallverdu and Jamie Delgado - two of Murray’s former coaches, in his coaching box.

Dimitrov had a solid run of form in the China circuit, making the semifinals of the Chengdu Open, the quarterfinals of the Beijing Open and the semifinals at the 2023 Rolex Shanghai Masters, where he beat Carlos Alcaraz, ranked No. 2 in the world, in the last 16 and Nicolas Jarry in the quarterfinals.

At the 2023 Rolex Paris Masters with his 94-minute triumph over Hubert Hurkacz, Dimitrov reached 40 tour-level wins in a season for the first time since 2017, which is also the year he last lifted an ATP Tour crown at the Nitto ATP Finals with Vallverdu. Dimitrov advanced to his second ATP Masters 1000 final and first since 2017 when he clawed past Stefanos Tsitsipas 6-3, 6-7(1), 7-6(3) at the Rolex Paris Masters.

In 2024, Dimitrov lifted his first title in Brisbane since he won his last title with Vallverdu at the ATP Finals in 2017. After beating Andy Murray in the first-round match up, Dimitrov did not lose another set the whole tournament defeating Rune in the Brisbane Final. By April 1, 2024, Dimitrov rejoined again the top 10 and went on to finish the year at No. 10.

Vallverdu and Dimitrov split for a second time in December 2025.

==== Stan Wawrinka ====
After parting ways with Grigor Dimitrov, Vallverdú joined Stan Wawrinka's coaching team before the start of the 2019 grass court season. Following the departure of Magnus Norman in September 2020 Vallverdu became the de facto head coach.

Vallverdu and Wawrinka ended their working relationship in October 2022.

== ATP Player Council ==
In June 2018, Vallverdú was voted by the body of ATP Coaches to act as the Coaches' representative in the ATP Player Council. After electing to leave the Players Council for a short period of time, Vallverdu was re-elected by the body of ATP Coaches to serve as the Coaches' Representative in the newly formed ATP Player Council of 2021 which included Andy Murray, Rafael Nadal and Roger Federer.

In 2023, Vallverdu was re-elected by the body of the ATP Coaches to continue serving as the Coaches' Representative in the newly formed ATP Player Council of 2023.

== Tournament director ==
=== San Diego Open ATP 250 ===
In August 2021, after the cancellation of the Asia Swing, Vallverdu instigated the collaboration between the ATP and the San Diego Barnes Tennis Centre which was then allocated a one-year 250 tournament license to be held 27 September - 3 October 2021 as a lead up to the Indian Wells Masters which had been postponed to October due to Covid. Vallverdu took on the role of Managing Director and the tournament attracted players including Denis Shapovalov, Andrey Rublev, Kei Nishikori, Dimitrov and Murray. With 8 of the top 20 players attending and the ranking cut off being 42 to get in the main draw it was the second most competitive ATP 250 all season since Doha. Billie Jean King accepted the role of honorary tournament chairperson.

In 2022, with the Asia swing still cancelled due to Covid, Vallverdú again instigated the collaboration between the ATP and the San Diego Barnes Tennis Centre which was then allocated a second one year 250 tournament license to be held post US Open 17–25 September. Vallverdú again took on the position of Managing Director.

=== Washington D.C. Citi Open ATP 500 ===
In 2023, 2024 and 2025 Vallverdu has taken on the role of tournament director of the Washington D.C. Mubadala Citi DC Open.

=== Saudi Arabia events ===
==== Jeddah Next Generation ATP Finals ====
In 2023, Vallerdu took on the role of co-tournament director of the 2023 Next Generation ATP Finals to be held at the King Abdullah Sports City in Jeddah, Saudi Arabia.

In 2024, Vallverdu again took on the same role for the 2024 Next Generation ATP Finals which was held again in Jeddah, in December. He was quoted saying, “Me personally, obviously, being close to the performance side and the player side, my honest, true opinion, is that this field is one of the best the Next Gen has ever had. It’s a very special and particular group that’s here in Jeddah. I think they all have a very high potential and a very high ceiling to grow and become the top players in the world.”

In 2025 Vallverdu was the tournament director once again.

==== WTA Finals Riyadh ====
In December 2024, Vallverdu took on the position of events organizer for the WTA Finals in Riyadh at the King Saud University indoor Arena.

== AD Global Sports ==
In 2023, Vallverdu co-founded the company AD Global Sports with Arran Yentob to support the development of sports in the UK and globally.

In November AD Global Sports partnered with Andy Murray to acquire the Padel team AD/vantage - one of six teams in the Hexagon Cup which took place in Madrid in February 2024.

Other Hexagon Cup Team owners include football star Lionel Messi, Sergio Aguero and Robert Lewandowski, Hollywood actor Eva Longoria, the Rafa Nadal Academy and F1 driver Pierre Gasly.

In 2025, Team AD/vantage brought on Anthony Joshua as a co-owner and also partnered with the Lawn Tennis Association LTA to help accelerate the growth of Padel throughout Britain.

In July 2025, team AD/vantage collaborated with Tom Holland and BERO to serve up the first-ever BERO Padel Classic. A one-day Pro-Am showdown held at London’s Padel Social Club. Other backers of the event included IMG and Reserve Padel and Vuori was the apparel partner.

The event was attended by the World No.1 padel supremo Arturo Coello and a cast of A-listers including Stormzy, Gordon Ramsay, Jay Shetty, Simu Liu, Kingsley Ben-Adir and Rob Delaney.

Team AD/vantage again partnered with Tom Holland in the city of Los Angeles, to host the “DRINK Padel Classic 2026". Partner brands of the event included Aston Martin and Nox and the event was attended by Zendaya.

== Philanthropy ==
=== COVID-19—Coaches & Players Fan Experiences ===
During the COVID-19 pandemic, Vallverdú in collaboration with the ATP launched the coaches and players fan experience initiative to help raise funds for tennis coaches most affected during the pandemic. The first round of bidding raised over 90,000 USD.

In July 2020, The second round was launched and gave fans the chance to bid on more exclusive fan experiences which included hitting with players Murray, Wawrinka, Lopez and Dimitrov.

The highest individual bid was made for two Wimbledon Final tickets and the chance to hit with Grand Slam Champion Murray and reached close to 52,000 USD. The bid to hit with the Swiss Grand Slam Champion Wawrinka went for 27,000 US Dollars. In total, the initiative launched by Vallverdú raised 218,000 US Dollars.

=== HIA - High Impact Athletes ===
In 2020, Vallverdu became an ambassador for the charity organization HIA Athletes. He is quoted saying “My family and I are passionate about the environment and helping the planet. Having coached some of the greatest tennis players in the world I understand how important optimization is. High Impact Athletes helps me optimize my giving by providing easy access to the most effective, impactful charities in the world.”

== Tour career ==
=== Doubles ===
In June 2008, he became British tennis player Andy Murray's doubles partner for the 2008 Queen's Club Championships in London.

== Davis Cup ==
Vallverdú has played for Venezuela in eight matches over six ties, including a semifinal appearance in Group I of the Americas Zone in 2005.

== Educational background ==
=== Sánchez-Casal Barcelona Tennis Academy ===
Vallverdú attended the Sánchez-Casal Barcelona Tennis Academy when he was 15, where he met Andy Murray.

=== University of Miami ===
Vallverdú graduated from the University of Miami in 2009 with a BA in International Marketing and Finance.

During his time at the University of Miami, Vallverdú was captain of the university tennis team.

He received five all-American honors, was no. 3 in the nation in singles and no. 1 in the nation in doubles with teammate Carl Mikael Sundberg.
