= Dumitru Hărădău =

Romanian tennis player

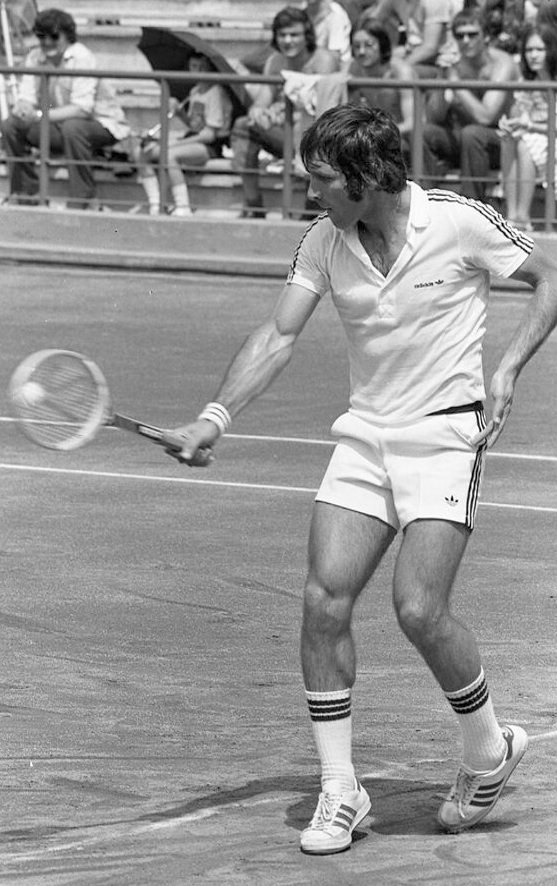
- Hărădău at the 1979 Davis Cup
- Country (sports): Romania
- Born: 2 December 1951 (age 74) Hunedoara, Romania

Singles
- Career record: 8–11
- Career titles: 0
- Highest ranking: No. 322 (2 July 1977)

Grand Slam singles results
- French Open: Q3 (1975)

Doubles
- Career record: 0–4

Grand Slam doubles results
- French Open: 1R (1973)
Medal record
Representing Romania
Summer Universiade
Silver medal – second place	1977 Sofia	Mixed doubles

Dumitru Hărădău (born 2 December 1951) is a Romanian former tennis player.

== Career ==
Hărădău was a member of the Romanian Davis Cup team between 1972 and 1984 and played the Davis Cup finals in 1977 and 1980, and the Davis Cup semi-finals in 1978 and 1979. He won the Romanian National Tennis Championship (1973-77) and the Balkan Tennis Championship 5 times each. He was ranked twice No. 3 at the European Tennis Championships.

He coached several tennis players, such as Horst Skoff (highest ranked 18 ATP) and Raluca Sandu (highest ranked 90 WTA).

Hărădău was ATP tournament director at Open Romania 1996-2006. He was the General Manager of the Romanian Tennis Federation 2005-08.
