= 1977 Davis Cup =

1977 edition of the Davis Cup

Details
- Duration: 25 August 1976 – 4 December 1977
- Edition: 66th
- Teams: 55

Champion
- Winning nation: Australia

The 1977 Davis Cup was the 66th edition of the Davis Cup, the most important tournament between national teams in men's tennis. 59 teams would enter the competition, 33 in the Europe Zone, 14 in the Americas Zone, and 12 in the Eastern Zone. Algeria made its first appearance in the tournament.

Argentina defeated the United States in the Americas Zone final, Australia defeated New Zealand in the Eastern Zone final, and France and Italy were the winners of the two Europe Zones, defeating Romania and Spain respectively.

In the Inter-Zonal Zone, Australia defeated Argentina and Italy defeated France in the semifinals. Australia then defeated the defending champions Italy in the final to win their 24th title overall and their first since 1973. The final was held at the White City Stadium in Sydney, Australia on 2–4 December.

== Politics in the Davis Cup ==
Throughout the 1960s and 1970s the Davis Cup had been affected by a number of protests and defaults by teams showing their opposition to the apartheid policies and white minority rule in South Africa and Rhodesia, and the human rights violations which occurred in Chile under Augusto Pinochet's military junta.

Several high-profile incidents included Mexico's refusal to play South Africa in the 1975 and 1976 Americas Zones, widespread protests in Sweden against the Pinochet junta during the 1975 Inter-Zonal semifinal between Sweden and Chile, and South Africa being awarded the Cup by default in 1974 after India refused to travel to South Africa for the final.

This show of political will in a sporting context was not welcomed by some, and for a brief time the United States, the inaugural winner of the cup, announced their decision to withdraw from the competition due to the apparent lenience of the tournament's organisers to prevent defaults by teams. In a show of solidarity, Great Britain and France also announced their intention to withdraw.

In response to these withdrawals, the Davis Cup committee made a greater commitment to keep politics out of the competition. The committee subsequently disqualified the Soviet Union as punishment for refusing to play Chile in the 1976 Inter-Zonal semifinals - the Soviets had already been barred from competing in the Federation Cup for refusing to play against South Africa and Rhodesia - from the tournament. The Soviet Union would have their entry rejected in 1978 after informing officials they would refuse to compete against South Africa.

Proposals were also brought forward to bring in an automatic one-year ban for any nation which pulled out of the tournament after the draw had been made, in an effort to prevent teams from defaulting on political grounds: The United States, Great Britain and France all returned and competed in the 1977 tournament.

== Americas Zone ==
=== Preliminary rounds ===
First Round
Brazil
bye
La Paz, Bolivia (clay)
Bolivia	4
Peru	1
Argentina
bye
Montevideo, Uruguay (clay)
Uruguay	2
Ecuador	3
Caracas, Venezuela
Venezuela	4
Colombia	0
bye
United States
Ottawa, Canada (indoor carpet)
Canada	5
Caribbean/West Indies	0
bye
Mexico

Qualifying Round
São Paulo, Brazil
Brazil	4
Bolivia	0
Buenos Aires, Argentina (clay)
Argentina	4
Ecuador	1
Caracas, Venezuela
Venezuela	1
United States	4
Ottawa, Canada (indoor carpet)
Canada	2
Mexico	3

=== Main Draw ===
Quarterfinals; 17–19 December 1976
Chile
bye
São Paulo, Brazil (clay)
Brazil	2
Argentina	3
Tucson, AZ, United States (hard)
United States	4
Mexico	1
bye
South Africa

Semifinals; 18–20 March; 15–17 April
Buenos Aires, Argentina (clay)
Chile	1
Argentina	4
Newport Beach, CA, United States (hard)
United States	4
South Africa	1

Final; 28 April–1 May
Buenos Aires, Argentina (clay)
Argentina	3
United States	2

==== Final ====
Argentina vs. United States

Argentina
3
Buenos Aires Lawn Tennis Club, Buenos Aires, Argentina
28 April–1 May 1977
Clay

United States
2

			1	2	3	4	5
1	(Argentina) (United States)	Ricardo Cano; Dick Stockton	3; 6	6; 4	8; 6	6; 4
2	(Argentina) (United States)	Guillermo Vilas; Brian Gottfried	6; 4	6; 0	6; 2
3	(Argentina) (United States)	Lito Álvarez / Ricardo Cano; Fred McNair / Sherwood Stewart	3; 6	3; 6	3; 6
4	(Argentina) (United States)	Guillermo Vilas; Dick Stockton	5; 7	6; 2	6; 2	6; 2
5	(Argentina) (United States)	Ricardo Cano; Brian Gottfried	5; 7	5; 7	0; 6

== Eastern Zone ==
=== Preliminary rounds ===
First Round
Manila, Philippines
Philippines	4
Sri Lanka	0
Kuala Lumpur, Malaysia
Malaysia	1
Thailand	4
South Korea	w/o
Pakistan
Tokyo, Japan (hard)
Japan	5
Chinese Taipei	0

Qualifying Round
Philippines
Thailand	w/o
Seoul, South Korea
South Korea	2
Japan	3

=== Main Draw ===
Quarterfinals; 2–12 December 1976
New Zealand
bye
Jakarta, Indonesia
Indonesia	5
Thailand	0
New Delhi, India
Japan	2
India	3
bye
Australia

Semifinals; 21–23 January
Auckland, New Zealand (grass)
New Zealand	5
Indonesia	0
Perth, Australia (grass)
India	0
Australia	5

Final; 11–13 February
Auckland, New Zealand (grass)
New Zealand	0
Australia	4

==== Final ====
New Zealand vs. Australia

New Zealand
0
Stanley Street, Auckland, New Zealand
11–13 February 1977
Grass

Australia
4

			1	2	3	4	5
1	(New Zealand) (Australia)	Onny Parun; Mark Edmondson	3; 6	5; 7	7; 5	4; 6
2	(New Zealand) (Australia)	Brian Fairlie; John Alexander	3; 6	2; 6	3; 6
3	(New Zealand) (Australia)	Brian Fairlie / Onny Parun; John Alexander / Phil Dent	1; 6	6; 3	6; 4	1; 6	4; 6
4	(New Zealand) (Australia)	Onny Parun; John Alexander	11; 9	6; 4	4; 6	3; 6	4; 6
5	(New Zealand) (Australia)	Chris Lewis; Mark Edmondson	4; 6	6; 4	4; 6			not completed

== Europe Zone ==
=== Zone A ===
==== Pre-qualifying rounds ====
First Round
Iran
bye
Algeria	w/o
Morocco

Qualifying Round
Algiers, Algeria (clay)
Iran	4
Algeria	1

==== Preliminary rounds ====
First Round
Poznań, Poland (clay)
Norway	0
Poland	5
bye
West Germany
Biel, Switzerland
Switzerland	3
Rhodesia	2
bye
France
Romania
bye
Brussels, Belgium
Bulgaria	2
Belgium	3
Czechoslovakia
bye
Dublin, Ireland
Iran	2
Ireland	3

Qualifying Round
Warsaw, Poland
Poland	3
West Germany	1
Zürich, Switzerland
Switzerland	2
France	3
Bucharest, Romania (clay)
Romania	5
Belgium	0
Prague, Czechoslovakia (clay)
Czechoslovakia	5
Ireland	0

==== Main Draw ====
Quarterfinals; 6–8 May
Soviet Union
bye
Warsaw, Poland
Poland	0
France	5
Bucharest, Romania (clay)
Romania	3
Czechoslovakia	1
bye
Great Britain

Semifinals; 9–11 June
Soviet Union
France	w/o
Bucharest, Romania (clay)
Romania	4
Great Britain	1

Final; 23–25 July
Paris, France (clay)
France	3
Romania	2

==== Final ====
France vs. Romania

France
3
Stade Roland Garros, Paris, France
23–25 July 1977
Clay

Romania
2

			1	2	3	4	5
1	(France) (Romania)	François Jauffret; Ilie Năstase	3; 6	0; 6	6; 4	6; 3	6; 1
2	(France) (Romania)	Patrick Proisy; Dumitru Hărădău	6; 2	6; 4	8; 6
3	(France) (Romania)	Patrice Dominguez / François Jauffret; Ilie Năstase / Ion Țiriac	3; 6	4; 6	6; 3	5; 7
4	(France) (Romania)	François Jauffret; Dumitru Hărădău	6; 1	6; 4	6; 4
5	(France) (Romania)	Patrick Proisy; Ilie Năstase	4; 6	6; 4	6; 8	1; 6

=== Zone B ===
==== Pre-qualifying rounds ====
First Round
Israel
bye
Kenya
Turkey	w/o
Luxembourg
bye
bye
Finland

Qualifying Round
Tel Aviv, Israel (hard)
Israel	5
Turkey	0
Mondorf-les-Bains, Luxembourg
Luxembourg	0
Finland	5

==== Preliminary rounds ====
First Round
Scheveningen, Netherlands (clay)
Netherlands	5
Israel	0
bye
Yugoslavia
Athens, Greece (clay)
Greece	3
Denmark	1
bye
Spain
Sweden
bye
Lisbon, Portugal (clay)
Portugal	1
Monaco	4
Vienna, Austria
Austria	5
Finland	0
bye
Egypt

Qualifying Round
Scheveningen, Netherlands (clay)
Netherlands	0
Yugoslavia	5
Athens, Greece (clay)
Greece	0
Spain	5
Uppsala, Sweden (indoor hard)
Sweden	5
Monaco	0
Vienna, Austria
Austria	5
Egypt	0

==== Main Draw ====
Quarterfinals; 6–8 May
Hungary
bye
Belgrade, Yugoslavia (clay)
Yugoslavia	1
Spain	4
Stockholm, Sweden (indoor carpet)
Sweden	5
Austria	0
bye
Italy

Semifinals; 15–25 July
Budapest, Hungary (clay)
Hungary	2
Spain	3
Båstad, Sweden (clay)
Sweden	1
Italy	4

Final; 29 July–1 August
Barcelona, Spain (clay)
Spain	2
Italy	3

==== Final ====
Spain vs. Italy

Spain
2
Barcelona, Spain
29 July–1 August 1977
Clay

Italy
3

			1	2	3	4	5
1	(Spain) (Italy)	José Higueras; Corrado Barazzutti	6; 4	6; 4	6; 3
2	(Spain) (Italy)	Manuel Orantes; Adriano Panatta	4; 6	6; 3	3; 6	1; 6
3	(Spain) (Italy)	José Higueras / Antonio Muñoz; Paolo Bertolucci / Adriano Panatta	4; 6	5; 7	4; 6
4	(Spain) (Italy)	Manuel Orantes; Corrado Barazzutti	5; 7	5; 7	1; 6
5	(Spain) (Italy)	Javier Soler; Adriano Panatta	6; 1	6; 0

== Inter-Zonal Zone ==
=== Draw ===
Semifinals; 14–16 September
Buenos Aires, Argentina (clay)
AME	Argentina	2
EAS	Australia	3
Rome, Italy (clay)
EUR-B	Italy	4
EUR-A	France	1

Final; 2–4 December
Sydney, Australia (grass)
EAS	Australia	3
EUR-A	Italy	1

=== Semifinals ===
Argentina vs. Australia

Argentina
2
Buenos Aires Lawn Tennis Club, Buenos Aires, Argentina
14–16 September 1977
Clay

Australia
3

			1	2	3	4	5
1	(Argentina) (Australia)	Guillermo Vilas; Phil Dent	6; 2	4; 6	7; 5	6; 3
2	(Argentina) (Australia)	Ricardo Cano; John Alexander	4; 6	0; 6	0; 6
3	(Argentina) (Australia)	Ricardo Cano / Guillermo Vilas; John Newcombe / Phil Dent	2; 6	6; 4	7; 9	6; 4	2; 6
4	(Argentina) (Australia)	Ricardo Cano; Phil Dent	4; 6	4; 6	3; 6
5	(Argentina) (Australia)	Guillermo Vilas; John Alexander	6; 4	7; 5	4; 6	6; 2

Italy vs. France

Italy
4
Foro Italico, Rome, Italy
14–16 September 1977
Clay

France
1

			1	2	3	4	5
1	(Italy) (France)	Adriano Panatta; Patrice Dominguez	6; 4	4; 6	6; 4	3; 6	6; 3
2	(Italy) (France)	Corrado Barazzutti; François Jauffret	6; 4	2; 6	2; 6	6; 2	6; 1
3	(Italy) (France)	Paolo Bertolucci / Adriano Panatta; Patrice Dominguez / François Jauffret	6; 1	3; 6	9; 7	6; 1
4	(Italy) (France)	Adriano Panatta; François Jauffret	6; 2	6; 1
5	(Italy) (France)	Corrado Barazzutti; Patrice Dominguez	2; 6	6; 0	6; 8

=== Final ===
Australia vs. Italy

Australia
3
White City Stadium, Sydney, Australia
2–4 December 1977
Grass

Italy
1

			1	2	3	4	5
1	(Australia) (Italy)	Tony Roche; Adriano Panatta	6; 3	6; 4	6; 4
2	(Australia) (Italy)	John Alexander; Corrado Barazzutti	6; 2	8; 6	4; 6	6; 2
3	(Australia) (Italy)	John Alexander / Phil Dent; Paolo Bertolucci / Adriano Panatta	4; 6	4; 6	5; 7
4	(Australia) (Italy)	John Alexander; Adriano Panatta	6; 4	4; 6	2; 6	8; 6	11; 9
5	(Australia) (Italy)	Tony Roche; Corrado Barazzutti	12; 12					not completed
