= Dale Power =

Canadian tennis player (1949–2024)

Dale Power (October 2, 1949 – May 16, 2024) was a Canadian tennis player.

== Life and career ==
Born in Toronto, Ontario, Power held the best singles Davis Cup record by winning percentage (6–2) of any Canadian player. Power also has the distinction of having played in the longest set in Davis Cup history, a second set that was won by Colombian Álvaro Betancourt 24–22 in a match won by Power in five sets in a 1976 tie.

Power was the top-ranked player in Canada for 10 of 12 years, winning the Canadian Closed Championship for singles seven times. He failed however to win a single top-tier (grand prix) professional tour match, going 0–11. His highest singles ranking was World No. 210, achieved in June, 1976.

In August 2006 Power was inducted into the Canadian Tennis Hall of Fame.

Power was also a skilled hockey player, and was drafted by the Montreal Canadiens in 1969, before deciding to concentrate exclusively on his tennis career. Leaving hockey a year later for four years, he returned for the 1974–75 season to play for the Fort Wayne Komets leading the team in scoring with 29 goals and a total of 78 points. Only after a knee injury did he decide to return full-time to tennis.

Power was later a tennis professional at the Granite Club in Toronto. He had one daughter, Sarah. Power died from bladder and blood cancer on May 16, 2024, at the age of 74.
