= 1981 Central Fidelity Banks International =

- Date: August 10–16
- Edition: 3rd
- Category: Toyota Series (3)
- Draw: 32S / 16D
- Prize money: $100,000
- Surface: Carpet (Note: Sporteze.) / indoor
- Location: Richmond, Virginia, U.S.
- Venue: Robins Center

Champions

Singles
- (United States) Mary-Lou Piatek

Doubles
- (United Kingdom) Sue Barker (United States) Ann Kiyomura
| ← 1980 · | Central Fidelity Banks International | · 1982 → |

The 1981 Central Fidelity Banks International was a women's singles tennis tournament played on indoor carpet courts at the Robins Center in Richmond, Virginia in the United States. The event was part of the Category 3 (Note: Tournaments with prize money for women of at least $100,000.) tier of the Toyota Series that was part of the 1981 WTA Tour. It was the third edition of the tournament and was held from August 10 through August 16, 1981. Seventh-seeded Mary-Lou Piatek won the singles title and earned $18,000 first-prize money.

== Finals ==
=== Singles ===
(United States) Mary-Lou Piatek defeated (United Kingdom) Sue Barker 6–4, 6–1

- It was Piatek's first singles title of her career.

=== Doubles ===
(United Kingdom) Sue Barker / (United States) Ann Kiyomura defeated (United States) Kathy Jordan / (United States) Anne Smith 4–6, 7–6, 6–4

== Prize money ==
| Event | W | F | SF | QF | Round of 16 | Round of 32 |
| Singles | $18,000 | $9,000 | $4,500 | $2,200 | $1,150 | $550 |
