= Longest tennis match records =

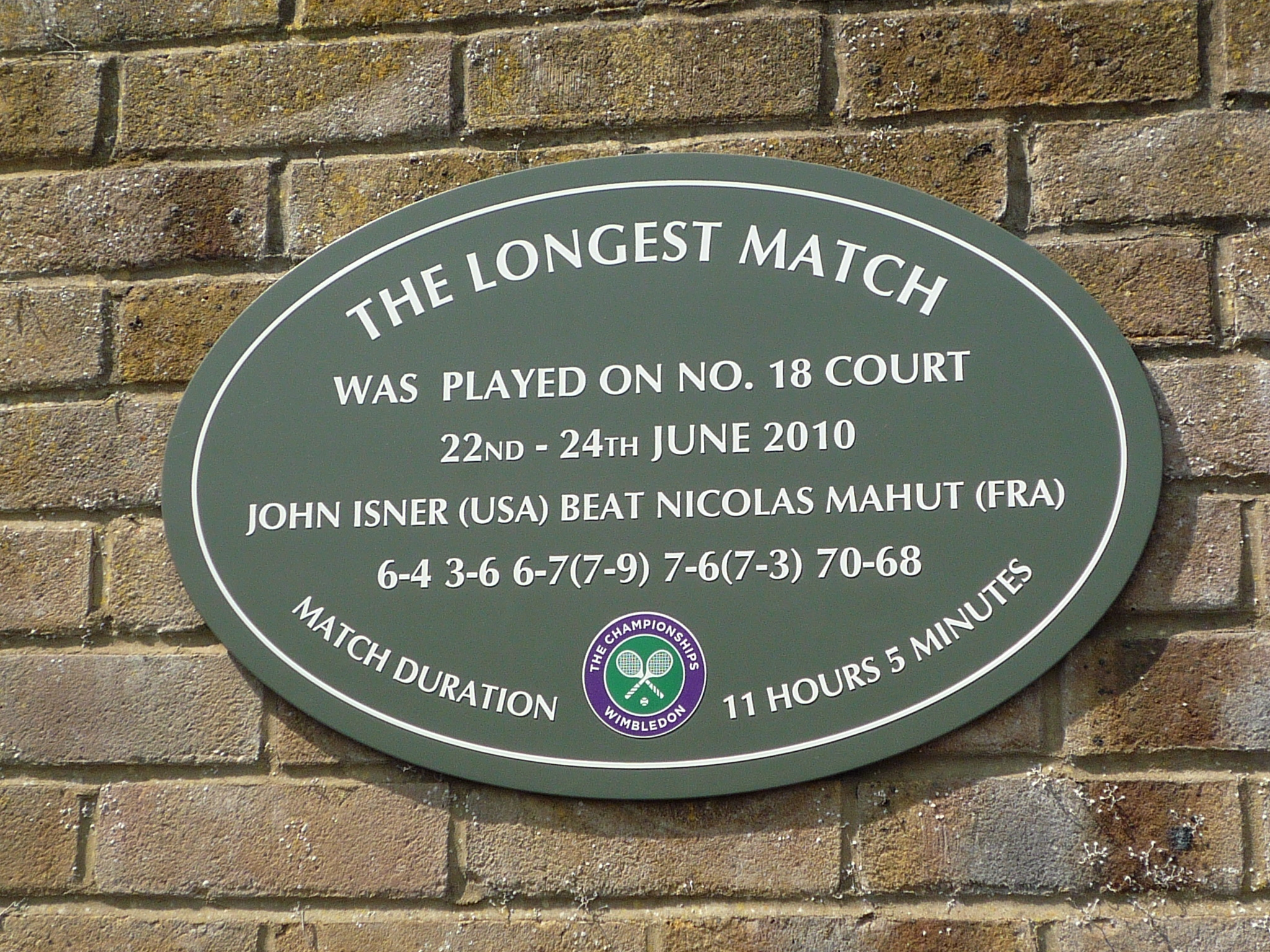
A plaque commemorating the Isner–Mahut match on Court 18 at Wimbledon.

This article details longest tennis match records by duration or number of games. The 1970–1973 introduction of the tiebreak reduced the opportunity for such records to be broken. However, among the four majors, the US Open, Australian Open and Wimbledon (since 2019) use the tiebreak in the final set, while the French Open, through 2021, was the only major to use the advantage set rules in the final set, which allows for an indefinite number of games until one player is ahead by two. A 2022 rule change now requires every Grand Slam tournament to use the tiebreak in the final set. The Olympic Games have also used a final set tiebreak since 2016.

== All competitions ==
Key
W	F	SF	QF	#R	RR	Q#	P#	DNQ	A	Z#	PO	G	S	B	NMS	NTI	P	NH

(W) winner; (F) finalist; (SF) semifinalist; (QF) quarterfinalist; (#R) rounds 4, 3, 2, 1; (RR) round-robin stage; (Q#) qualification round; (P#) preliminary round; (DNQ) did not qualify; (A) absent; (Z#) Davis/Fed Cup Zonal Group (with number indication) or (PO) play-off; (G) gold, (S) silver or (B) bronze Olympic/Paralympic medal; (NMS) not a Masters tournament; (NTI) not a Tier I tournament; (P) postponed; (NH) not held; (SR) strike rate (events won / competed); (W–L) win–loss record.

=== Overall ===
==== Longest matches by duration ====
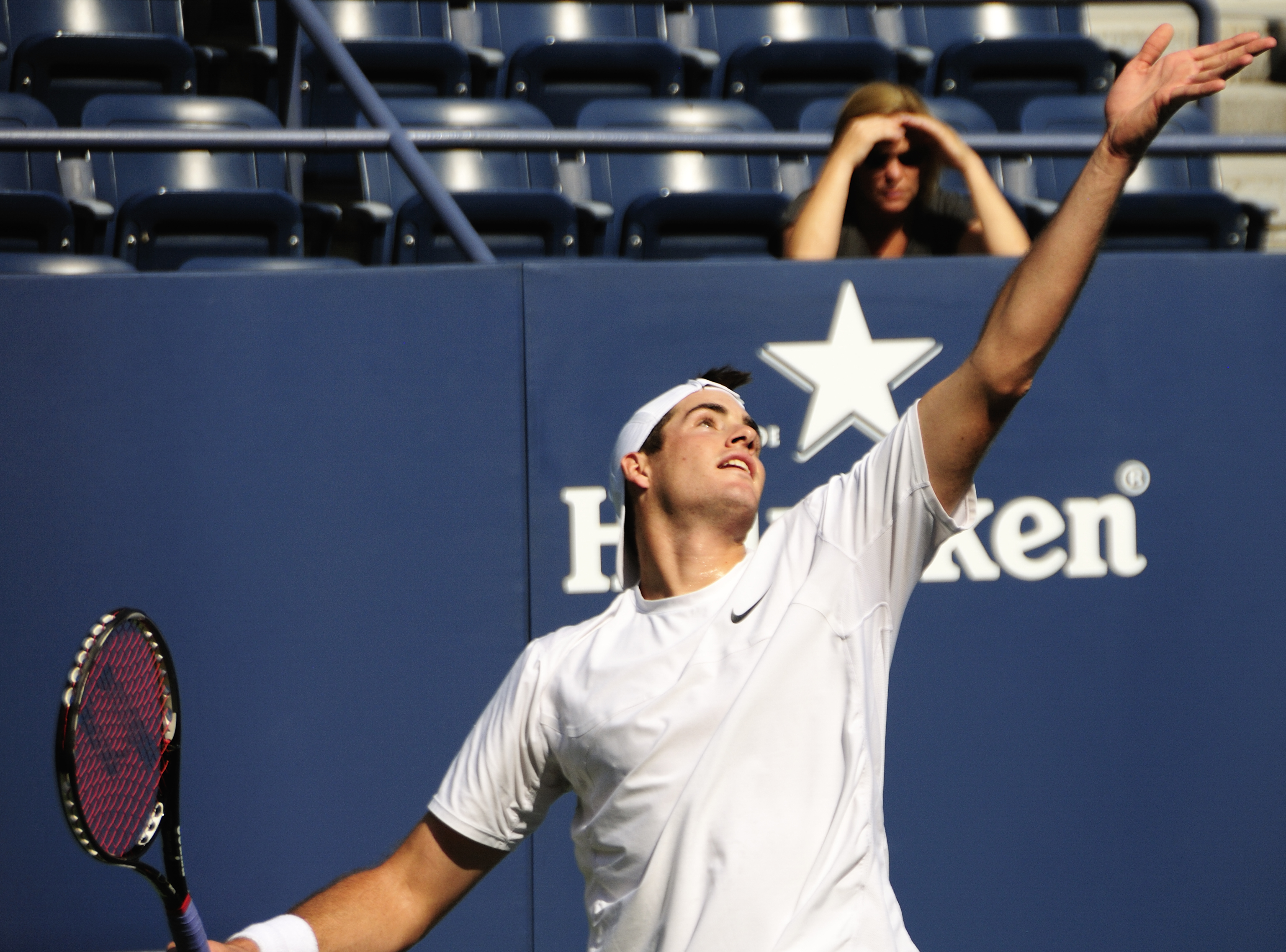
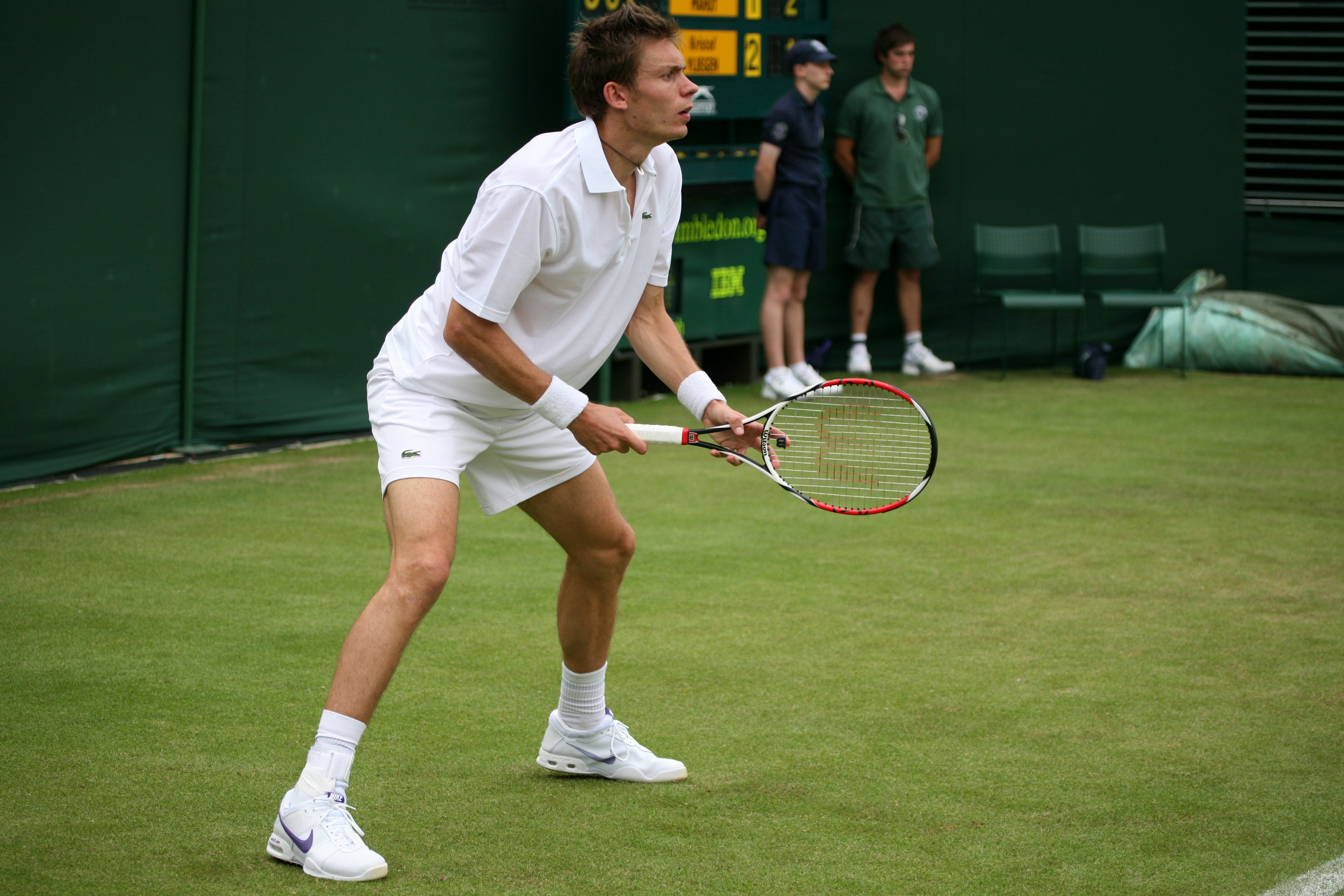
John Isner (top) defeated Nicolas Mahut (bottom) 6–4, 3–6, 6–7^{(7–9)}, 7–6^{(7–3)}, 70–68 in a record 11 hours and 5 minutes

Only two professional competitive matches have lasted longer than seven hours and 14 matches have lasted longer than six hours.

#	Duration (hh:mm)	Winner	Loser	Event	Round	Score
1	11:05 (3 days)	(United States) John Isner	(France) Nicolas Mahut	2010 Wimbledon	1R	6–4, 3–6, 6–7^{(7–9)}, 7–6^{(7–3)}, 70–68
2	07:01	Czech Republic (Tomáš Berdych; Lukáš Rosol)	Switzerland (Stanislas Wawrinka; Marco Chiudinelli)	2013 Davis Cup	1R	6–4, 5–7, 6–4, 6–7^{(3–7)}, 24–22
3	06:43	Argentina (Leonardo Mayer)	Brazil (João Souza)	2015 Davis Cup	1R	7–6^{(7–4)}, 7–6^{(7–5)}, 5–7, 5–7, 15–13
4	06:36	(South Africa) Kevin Anderson	(United States) John Isner	2018 Wimbledon	SF	7–6^{(8–6)}, 6–7^{(5–7)}, 6–7^{(9–11)}, 6–4, 26–24
5	06:33 (2 days)	(France) Fabrice Santoro	(France) Arnaud Clément	2004 French Open	1R	6–4, 6–3, 6–7^{(5–7)}, 3–6, 16–14
6	06:31	(United States) Vicki Nelson	(United States) Jean Hepner	1984 Central Fidelity; Banks International	1R	6–4, 7–6^{(13–11)}
7	06:22	United States (John McEnroe)	Sweden (Mats Wilander)	1982 Davis Cup	QF	9–7, 6–2, 15–17, 3–6, 8–6 (before tiebreak era)
8	06:21	Germany (Boris Becker)	United States (John McEnroe)	1987 Davis Cup	PO	4–6, 15–13, 8–10, 6–2, 6–2 (before tiebreak era)
9	06:20	Argentina (Lucas Arnold Ker; David Nalbandian)	Russia (Yevgeny Kafelnikov; Marat Safin)	2002 Davis Cup	SF	6–4, 6–4, 5–7, 3–6, 19–17
10	06:15	Argentina (José Luis Clerc)	United States (John McEnroe)	1980 Davis Cup	F	6–3, 6–2, 4–6, 13–11 (before tiebreak era)
11	06:09 (2 days)	(The Bahamas) Mark Knowles (Canada) Daniel Nestor	(Sweden) Simon Aspelin (Australia) Todd Perry	2006 Wimbledon	QF	5–7, 6–3, 6–7^{(5–7)}, 6–3, 23–21
12	06:05	(Italy) Lorenzo Giustino	(France) Corentin Moutet	2020 French Open	1R	0–6, 7–6^{(9–7)}, 7–6^{(7–3)}, 2–6, 18–16
13	06:04	Austria (Horst Skoff)	Sweden (Mats Wilander)	1989 Davis Cup	QF	6–7^{(5–7)}, 7–6^{(9–7)}, 1–6, 6–4, 9–7
14	06:01	Canada (Harry Fritz)	Venezuela (Jorge Andrew)	1982 Davis Cup	SF	16–14, 11–9, 9–11, 4–6, 11–9 (before tiebreak era)

==== Longest matches by number of games ====
#	No. of games	Winner	Loser	Event	Round	Score
1	183	(United States) John Isner	(France) Nicolas Mahut	2010 Wimbledon	1R	6–4, 3–6, 6–7^{(7–9)}, 7–6^{(7–3)}, 70–68
2	122	United States (Stan Smith; Erik van Dillen)	Chile (Patricio Cornejo; Jaime Fillol)	1973 Davis Cup	F	7–9, 37–39, 8–6, 6–1, 6–3
3	112	(United States) Pancho Gonzales	(Puerto Rico) Charlie Pasarell	1969 Wimbledon	1R	22–24, 1–6, 16–14, 6–3, 11–9.
4	105	(Mexico) Marcelo Lara (Mexico) Joaquín Loyo-Mayo	(Spain) Manuel Santana (Mexico) Luis-Augusto García	1966 US Open	3R	10–12, 24–22, 11–9, 3–6, 6–2
4	105	(South Africa) Cliff Drysdale (South Africa) Ray Moore	(Australia) Roy Emerson (Brazil) Ron Barnes	1967 US Open	QF	29–31, 8–6, 3–6, 8–6, 6–2
6	102	(Brazil) Marcelo Melo (Brazil) André Sá	(Australia) Paul Hanley (Zimbabwe) Kevin Ullyett	2007 Wimbledon	2R	5–7, 7–6^{(7–4)}, 4–6, 7–6^{(9–7)}, 28–26
7	100	(United States) Franklin Robbins	(United States) Donald Dell	1969 US Open	1R	22–20, 9–7, 6–8, 8–10, 6–4
7	100	(Canada) Harry Fritz	(Venezuela) Jorge Andrew	1982 Davis Cup	SF	16–14, 11–9, 9–11, 4–6, 11–9
9	99	(South Africa) Kevin Anderson	(United States) John Isner	2018 Wimbledon	SF	7–6^{(8–6)}, 6–7^{(5–7)}, 6–7^{(9–11)}, 6–4, 26–24
10	98	(Socialist Federal Republic of Yugoslavia) Nikola Pilić (United States) Gene Scott	(United States) Cliff Richey (Denmark) Torben Ulrich	1966 Wimbledon	1R	19–21, 12–10, 6–4, 4–6, 9–7

=== Men's singles ===
Winner of the match also won the tournament.

The Isner–Mahut match at the 2010 Wimbledon Championships holds the record for the longest tennis match both in time and games played. It lasted for 11 hours and 5 minutes.

==== Best-of-five-set match ====
#	Duration (hh:mm)	Winner	Loser	Event	Round	Score
1	11:05 (3 days)	(United States) John Isner	(France) Nicolas Mahut	2010 Wimbledon	1R	6–4, 3–6, 6–7^{(7–9)}, 7–6^{(7–3)}, 70–68
2	06:43	Argentina (Leonardo Mayer)	Brazil (João Souza)	2015 Davis Cup	1R	7–6^{(7–4)}, 7–6^{(7–5)}, 5–7, 5–7, 15–13
3	06:36	(South Africa) Kevin Anderson	(United States) John Isner	2018 Wimbledon	SF	7–6^{(8–6)}, 6–7^{(5–7)}, 6–7^{(9–11)}, 6–4, 26–24
4	06:33 (2 days)	(France) Fabrice Santoro	(France) Arnaud Clément	2004 French Open	1R	6–4, 6–3, 6–7^{(5–7)}, 3–6, 16–14
5	06:22	United States (John McEnroe)	Sweden (Mats Wilander)	1982 Davis Cup	QF	9–7, 6–2, 15–17, 3–6, 8–6 (before tiebreak era)
6	06:21	Germany (Boris Becker)	United States (John McEnroe)	1987 Davis Cup	PO	4–6, 15–13, 8–10, 6–2, 6–2 (before tiebreak era)
7	06:15	Argentina (José Luis Clerc)	United States (John McEnroe)	1980 Davis Cup	F	6–3, 6–2, 4–6, 14–12 (before tiebreak era)
8	06:05 (2 days)	(Italy) Lorenzo Giustino	(France) Corentin Moutet	2020 French Open	1R	0–6, 7–6^{(9–7)}, 7–6^{(7–3)}, 2–6, 18–16
9	06:04	Austria (Horst Skoff)	Sweden (Mats Wilander)	1989 Davis Cup	QF	6–7^{(5–7)}, 7–6^{(9–7)}, 1–6, 6–4, 9–7
10	06:01	Canada (Harry Fritz)	Venezuela (Jorge Andrew)	1982 Davis Cup	SF	16–14, 11–9, 9–11, 4–6, 11–9 (before tiebreak era)

==== Best-of-three-set match ====
#	Duration (hh:mm)	Winner	Loser	Event	Round	Score
1	04:27	(Kazakhstan) Timofey Skatov	(Taiwan) Chun-Hsin Tseng	2026 Internazionali di Tennis Città di Perugia	2R	6–7^{(2–7)}, 7–6^{(9–7)}, 7–6^{(7–4)}
2	04:26	(Switzerland) Roger Federer	(Argentina) Juan Martín del Potro	2012 Olympics	SF	3–6, 7–6^{(7–5)}, 19–17
3	04:24	(Chile) Tomás Barrios Vera	(Argentina) Juan Bautista Torres	2025 Lima Challenger II	QF	7–6^{(7–2)}, 6–7^{(6–8)}, 7–6^{(12–10)}
4	04:23	(Italy) Flavio Cipolla	(Colombia) Robert Farah	2011 Open Barranquilla	2R	6–7^{(5–7)}, 7–5, 7–6^{(7–5)}
5	04:21	(France) Calvin Hemery	(Canada) Alexis Galarneau	2023 Savannah Challenger	1R	6–7^{(8–10)}, 7–6^{(7–4)}, 7–6^{(7–4)}
6	04:13	(France) Ugo Humbert	(Japan) Taro Daniel	2023 Sardegna Open	QF	6–7^{(11–13)}, 7–6^{(9–7)}, 6–4
7	04:03	(Spain) Rafael Nadal	(Serbia) Novak Djokovic	2009 Madrid Open	SF	3–6, 7–6^{(7–5)}, 7–6^{(11–9)}
8	04:00	(Spain) Rafael Nadal	(Argentina) Mariano Navone	2024 Swedish Open	QF	6–7^{(2–7)}, 7–5, 7–5
9	03:59	(China) Shang Juncheng	(France) Corentin Moutet	2024 Madrid Open	1R	6–7^{(9–11)}, 6–2, 7–6^{(10–8)}
10	03:57	(France) Jo-Wilfried Tsonga	(Canada) Milos Raonic	2012 Olympics	2R	6–3, 3–6, 25–23

=== Women's singles ===
The longest women's match (by time) took place at a tournament in Richmond, Virginia, in 1984, when Vicki Nelson took 6 hours, 31 minutes to defeat Jean Hepner 6–4, 7–6^{(13–11)}. The match featured a 29-minute, 643-shot rally, the longest in professional tennis history, though no video exists of this point.

Unlike men's singles matches, where Grand Slam events are played over the best of five sets, all women's matches are played as the best of three sets. All matches since January 1, 2019 have been checked, but there are likely to be many more from earlier years which have not yet been recognised, especially as qualifying matches in ITF tournaments before that date would normally have been played over the best of three tie-break sets.

Winner of the match also won the tournament.

#	Duration (hh:mm)	Winner	Loser	Event	Round	Score
1	06:31	(United States) Vicki Nelson	(United States) Jean Hepner	1984 Central Fidelity Banks International	1R	6–4, 7–6^{(13–11)}
2	05:03	(Italy) Maria Elena Camerin	(Romania) Monica Niculescu	2 Oct 2009 ITF Athens Open	QF	6–4, 6–7^{(3–7)}, 7–6^{(7–5)}
3	04:56	(Russia) Amina Anshba	(Brazil) Laura Pigossi	7 Apr 2021 Córdoba ITF Pro Circuit W25	1R	7–5, 3–6, 7–5
4 (Note: The fourth-longest match listed above was recorded in the ITF live scoring data as taking 5 hours and 4 minutes. SofaScore recorded 4 hours and 54 minutes and TNNS recorded 4 hours and 55 minutes. The shortest of these has been included in this table.)	04:54	(Egypt) Sandra Samir	(Serbia) Tijana Sretenović	27 Aug 2022 Cairo ITF Pro Circuit W15	SF	6–7^{(2–7)}, 7–6^{(8–6)}, 6–1
5	04:49	(United States) Hanna Chang	(Norway) Ulrikke Eikeri	6 May 2021 Naples ITF Pro Circuit W25	2R	7–6^{(12–10)}, 4–6, 6–4
6 (Note: The sixth-longest match listed above was recorded in the ITF live scoring data as taking 4 hours and 50 minutes. SofaScore recorded 4 hours and 46 minutes and TNNS recorded 4 hours and 47 minutes. The shortest of these has been included in this table.)	04:46	(Peru) Anastasia Iamachkine	(Argentina) Justina Gonzalez Daniele	29 Nov 2022 Buenos Aires ITF Pro Circuit W15	1R	7–5, 6–7^{(6–8)}, 7–6^{(7–5)}
6 (Note: The sixth equal-longest match listed above was recorded in the ITF live scoring data as taking 5 hours and 1 minute. The shorter time, recorded by both SofaScore and TNNS, has been included in this table.)	04:46	(Poland) Zuzanna Pawlikowska	(Egypt) Sandra Samir	27 Oct 2024 Sharm El Sheikh ITF Pro Circuit W15	F	7–5, 6–7^{(3–7)}, 7–5
7	04:44	(Italy) Francesca Schiavone	(Russia) Svetlana Kuznetsova	2011 Australian Open	4R	6–4, 1–6, 16–14
8	04:43	(United States) Hina Inoue	(United States) Kylie Collins	16 Jan 2026 Bradenton ITF Pro Circuit W35	2R	6-7^{(2-7)}, 7-6^{(7-5)}, 6-4
8 (Note: The eighth-longest match listed above was recorded in the ITF live scoring data as taking 4 hours and 53 minutes. The shorter time, recorded by both SofaScore and TNNS, has been included in this table.)	04:43	(Egypt) Amira Badawi	(Sweden) Louise Brunskog	19 Aug 2022 Cairo ITF Pro Circuit W15	QF	7–5, 6–7^{(5–7)}, 7–6^{(7–3)}
9	04:42	(Japan) Kurumi Nara	(Romania) Monica Niculescu	2010 French Open	Q3	4–6, 7–6^{(7–3)}, 10–8
9 (Note: The ninth equal-longest match listed above was recorded in the ITF live scoring data as taking 4 hours and 47 minutes. SofaScore recorded 4 hours and 42 minutes and TNNS recorded 4 hours and 43 minutes. The shortest of these has been included in this table.)	04:42	(Italy) Diletta Cherubini	(Australia) Tina Smith	21 Sep 2023 Santa Margherita di Pula ITF Pro Circuit W25	2R	7–6^{(7–4)}, 4–6, 7–6^{(7–6)}

==== Main WTA Tour ====
Winner of the match also won the tournament.

#	Duration (hh:mm)	Winner	Loser	Event	Round	Score
1	06:31	(United States) Vicki Nelson	(United States) Jean Hepner	1984 Central Fidelity Banks International	1R	6–4, 7–6^{(13–11)}
2	04:44	(Italy) Francesca Schiavone	(Russia) Svetlana Kuznetsova	2011 Australian Open	4R	6–4, 1–6, 16–14
3	04:19	(Czech Republic) Barbora Strýcová	(Russia) Regina Kulikova	2010 Australian Open	1R	7–6^{(7–5)}, 6–7^{(10–12)}, 6–3
4	04:15	(Spain) Sara Sorribes Tormo	(China) Gao Xinyu	2024 China Open	1R	6–7^{(4–7)}, 7–5, 7–5
5	04:09	(Germany) Laura Siegemund	(China) Wang Xiyu	2024 Thailand Open	2R	7–6^{(7–3)}, 4–6, 7–6^{(7–1)}
6	04:07	(France) Virginie Buisson	(France) Noëlle van Lottum	1995 French Open	1R	6–7^{(3–7)}, 7–5, 6–2
7	03:55	(Australia) Kerry Melville	(United States) Pam Teeguarden	1972 French Open	3R	7–6^{(9–7)}, 4–6, 16–14
7	03:55	(Slovakia) Kristína Kučová	(Georgia (country)) Ekaterine Gorgodze	2021 Poland Open	QF	6–7^{(4–7)}, 7–6^{(9–7)}, 7–6^{(7–3)}
9	03:54	(Spain) Sara Sorribes Tormo	(Colombia) Camila Osorio	2022 Cleveland Open	1R	7–6^{(7–5)}, 4–6, 6–3
10	03:53	(Ukraine) Lesia Tsurenko	(Russia) Kamilla Rakhimova	2022 Budapest Grand Prix	2R	6–7^{(1–7)}, 6–4, 7–5

The longest match consisting of two standard sets and a match tie-break was played in the second qualifying round of a $25,000 ITF tournament in Darmstadt, Germany, on July 16, 2024. Sandra Samir defeated Denisa Glushkova 6–7^{(1–7)}, 6–3, [10–8]. The official ITF live scoring data recorded the duration as three hours and 45 minutes. RankTennis recorded the same time and TNNS recorded one minute longer, but SofaScore recorded five minutes less. The official duration is one minute longer than that recorded for a match in the second qualifying round of a $25,000 ITF tournament in Buenos Aires, Argentina, on January 9, 2023 where Valentina Mutilba defeated Luciana Blatter 6–7^{(7–9)}, 7–6^{(12–10)}, [10–7]. The official ITF live scoring data recorded the duration as three hours and 44 minutes, but SofaScore and TNNS both recorded three minutes less.

=== Doubles ===
==== Longest doubles matches by time ====
#	Duration (hh:mm)	Winner	Loser	Event	Round	Score
1	07:01	Czech Republic (Tomáš Berdych; Lukáš Rosol)	Switzerland (Stanislas Wawrinka; Marco Chiudinelli)	2013 Davis Cup	1R	6–4, 5–7, 6–4, 6–7^{(3–7)}, 24–22
2	06:20	Argentina (Lucas Arnold Ker; David Nalbandian)	Russia (Yevgeny Kafelnikov; Marat Safin)	2002 Davis Cup	SF	6–4, 6–4, 5–7, 3–6, 19–17

==== Longest doubles matches by number of games ====
Before tiebreak era
# of Games	Winner	Loser	Event	Round	Score
122	United States (Stan Smith; Erik van Dillen)	Chile (Patricio Cornejo; Jaime Fillol)	1973 Davis Cup	Z#	7–9, 37–39, 8–6, 6–1, 6–3

During tiebreak era
# of Games	Winner	Loser	Event	Round	Score
102	(Brazil) Marcelo Melo (Brazil) André Sá	(Australia) Paul Hanley (Zimbabwe) Kevin Ullyett	2007 Wimbledon	2R	5–7, 7–6^{(7–4)}, 4–6, 7–6^{(9–7)}, 28–26

== Australian Open ==
=== Men's singles ===
Longest match by time played
2012 final, 5 hours and 53 minutes
(Serbia) Novak Djokovic	5	6	6	6^{5}	7
(Spain) Rafael Nadal	7	4	2	7^{7}	5

Note: Also the longest Grand Slam singles final in the Open Era.

Longest match by number of games, before the tiebreaker introduction
1970 quarterfinal, 93 games
(United States) Dennis Ralston	19	20	4	6
(Australia) John Newcombe	17	18	6	3

Longest singles final match by number of games, before the tiebreaker introduction
1927, 71 games
(Australia) Gerald Patterson	3	6	3	18	6
(Australia) John Hawkes	6	4	6	16	3

Note: This was the longest Grand Slam final in games played until the Federer v Roddick final at Wimbledon in 2009.

Longest match by number of games, using tiebreaker scoring
2017 first round, 84 games
(Croatia) Ivo Karlović	6^{6}	3	7	6	22
(Argentina) Horacio Zeballos	7^{8}	6	5	2	20

=== Men's doubles ===
Longest doubles final match by number of games, before the tiebreaker introduction
1966, 87 games
(Australia) Roy Emerson (Australia) Fred Stolle	7	6	6	14	12
(Australia) John Newcombe (Australia) Tony Roche	9	3	8	12	10

Longest doubles final match by number of games, using tiebreaker scoring
2000, 71 games
(South Africa) Ellis Ferreira (United States) Rick Leach	6	3	6	3	18
(Zimbabwe) Wayne Black (Australia) Andrew Kratzmann	4	6	3	6	16

=== Women's singles ===
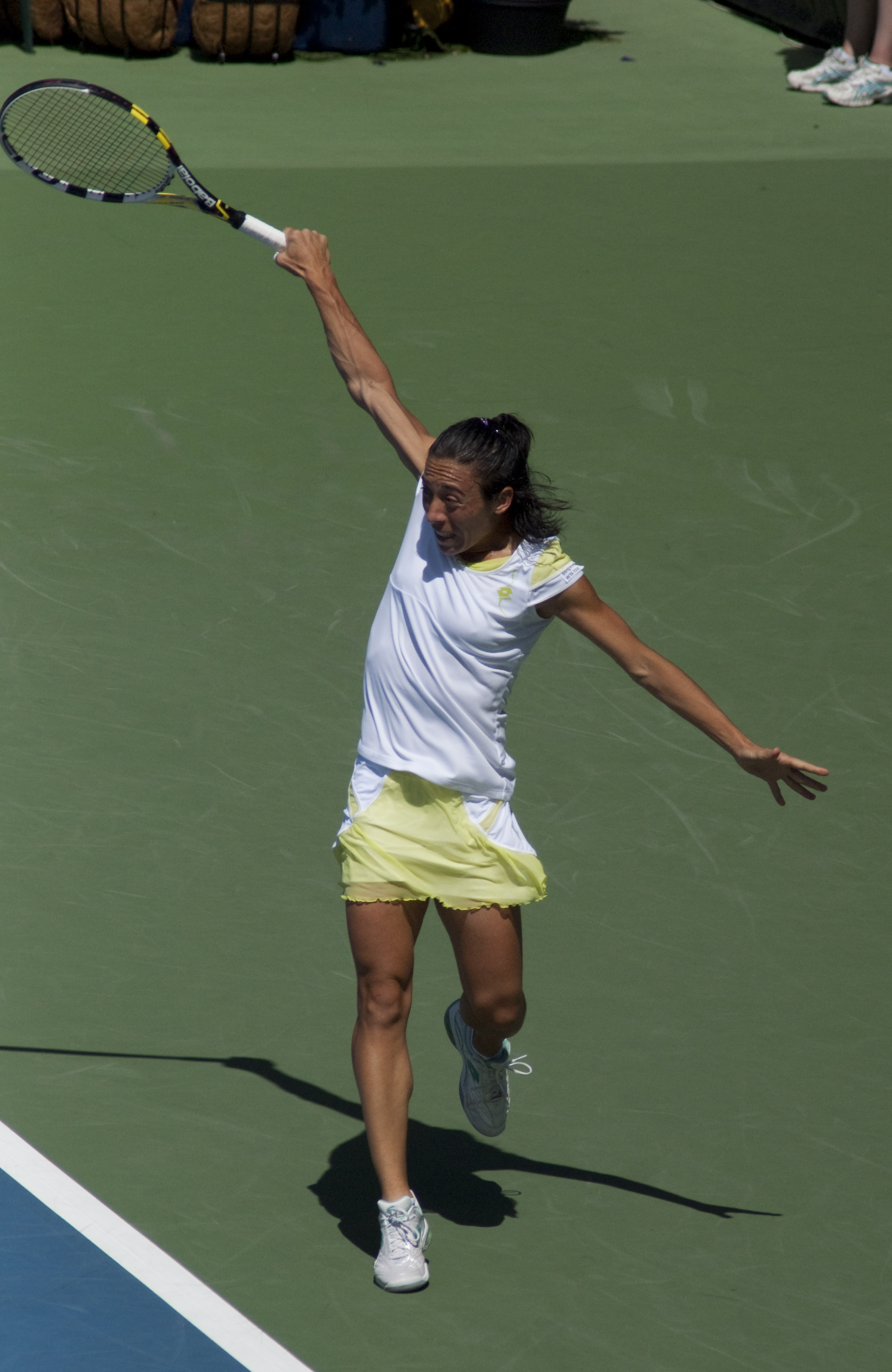
Francesca Schiavone won the longest ever match at a women's Grand Slam event in 4 hours 44 minutes.

Longest match by time played
2011 fourth round, 4 hours and 44 minutes
(Italy) Francesca Schiavone	6	1	16
(Russia) Svetlana Kuznetsova	4	6	14

Note: Also the longest women's match in a Grand Slam in the Open Era, and the second-longest women's match in the Open Era.

Longest match by number of games, using tiebreaker scoring
1996 quarterfinals, 48 games
(United States) Chanda Rubin	6	2	16
(Spain) Arantxa Sánchez Vicario	4	6	14

2018 third round, 48 games
(Romania) Simona Halep	4	6	15
(United States) Lauren Davis	6	4	13

Longest singles final match by number of games, before the tiebreaker introduction
1956, 33 games
(Australia) Mary Carter Reitano	3	6	9
(Australia) Thelma Coyne Long	6	2	7

=== Women's doubles ===
Longest doubles final match by number of games, before the tiebreaker introduction
1926, 37 games
(Australia) Esna Boyd Robertson (Australia) Meryl O'Hara Wood	6	6	8
(Australia) Daphne Akhurst Cozens (Australia) Marjorie Cox Crawford	3	8	6

=== Mixed doubles ===
Longest mixed doubles final match by number of games, before the tiebreaker introduction
1933, 45 games
(Australia) Marjorie Crawford (Australia) Jack Crawford	3	7	13
(United States) Marjorie Gladman Van Ryn (United States) Ellsworth Vines	6	5	11

Longest mixed doubles final match by number of games, using tiebreaker scoring
1992, 39 games
(Australia) Nicole Provis (Australia) Mark Woodforde	6	4	11
(Spain) Arantxa Sánchez Vicario (Australia) Todd Woodbridge	3	6	9

== French Open ==
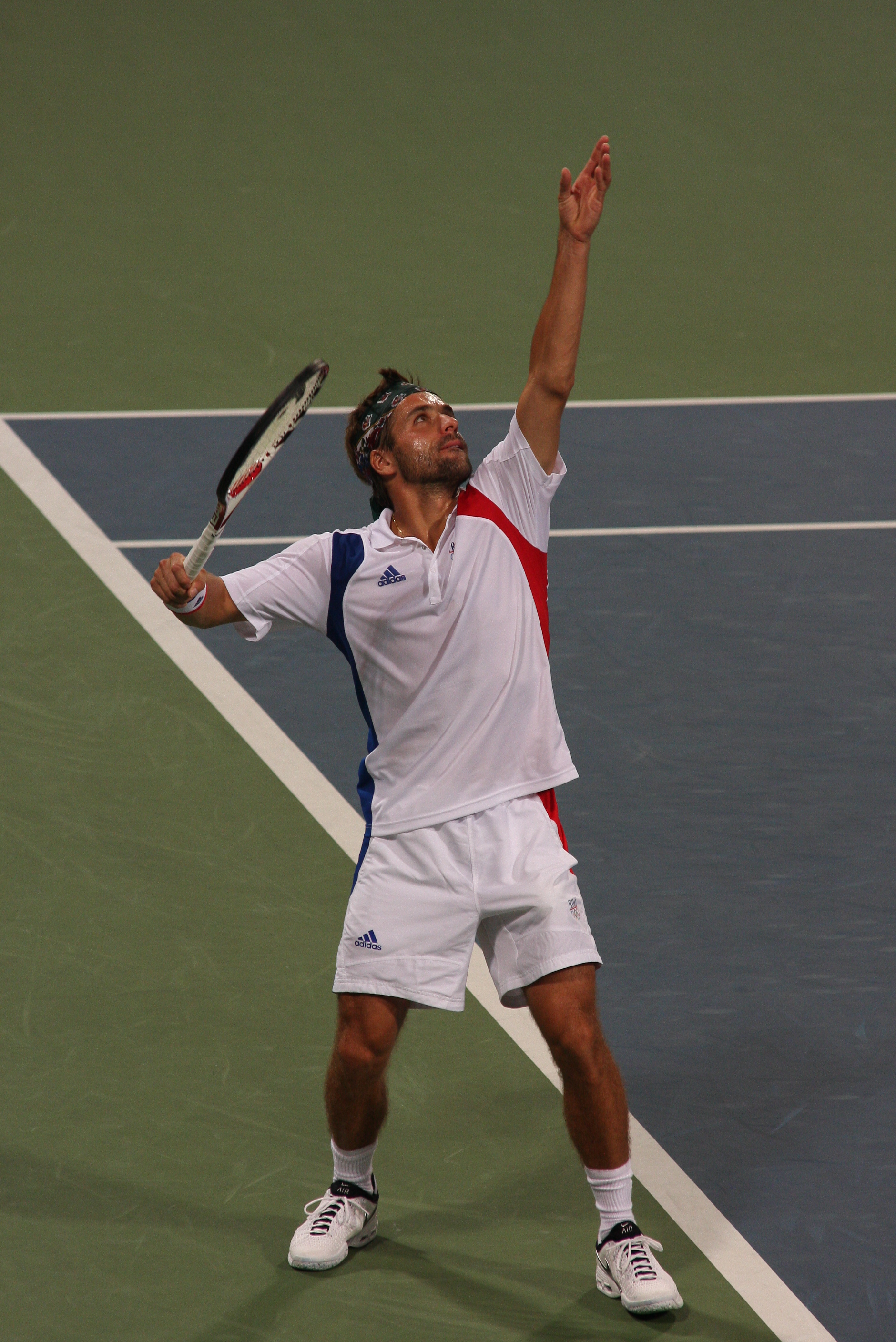
Arnaud Clément (pictured) lost the longest ever match at the French Open to Fabrice Santoro in 6 hours 33 minutes. He expressed his disappointment at losing the match which until 2010 held the record for the longest ever match stating: "Frankly, I don't give a damn ... What world record? Do I get a medal? If I'm not getting anything, frankly, I'm not interested. It doesn't count."

=== Men's singles ===
Longest match by time played
2004 first round, 6 hours and 33 minutes
(France) Fabrice Santoro	6	6	6^{5}	3	16
(France) Arnaud Clément	4	3	7^{7}	6	14

Longest match by number of games, before the tiebreaker introduction
1957 first round, 83 games
(Australia) Bob Mark	13	6	6	8	10
(Hungary) Antal Jancsó	15	3	8	6	8

Longest match by number of games, using tiebreaker scoring
2012 second round, 76 games
(France) Paul-Henri Mathieu	6^{2}	6	6	3	18
(United States) John Isner	7^{7}	4	4	6	16

Longest singles final match by time played
2025, 5 hours and 29 minutes
(Italy) Jannik Sinner	6	7^{7}	4	6^{3}	6^{2}
(Spain) Carlos Alcaraz	4	6^{4}	6	7^{7}	7^{10}

Longest singles final by games, before introduction of the tiebreaker
1927, 61 games
(France) René Lacoste	6	4	5	6	11
(United States) Bill Tilden	4	6	7	3	9

=== Men's doubles ===
Longest men's doubles final match by number of games, before the tiebreaker introduction
1934, 63 games
(France) Jean Borotra (France) Jacques Brugnon	11	6	2	4	9
(Australia) Jack Crawford (United States) Vivian McGrath	9	3	6	6	7

1971, 63 games
(United States) Arthur Ashe (United States) Marty Riessen	6	4	6	6	11
(United States) Tom Gorman (United States) Stan Smith	8	6	3	4	9

=== Women's singles ===
Longest match by time played
1995 first round, 4 hours and 7 minutes
(France) Virginie Buisson	6^{3}	7	6
(France) Noëlle van Lottum	7^{7}	5	2

Longest match by number of games, before the tiebreaker introduction
1972 third round, 56 games
(Australia) Kerry Melville Reid	9	4	16
(United States) Pam Teeguarden	7	6	14

Longest match by number of games, using tiebreaker scoring
1991 second round, 46 games
(United States) Linda Harvey-Wild	7^{9}	6^{7}	11
(Peru) Laura Gildemeister	6^{7}	7^{9}	9

Longest singles final match by number of games
1996, 40 games
(Germany) Steffi Graf	6	6^{4}	10
(Spain) Arantxa Sánchez Vicario	3	7^{7}	8

=== Women's doubles ===
Longest doubles final match by number of games, before the tiebreaker introduction
1955, 50 games
(United States) Beverly Baker Fleitz (United States) Darlene Hard	7	6	13
(United Kingdom) Shirley Brasher Bloomer (United Kingdom) Patricia Ward Hales	5	8	11

Note: This is also the longest women's doubles match in terms of games that has occurred at The French Open.

=== Mixed doubles ===
Longest match by number of games, before the tiebreaker introduction
1956, 38 games
(Italy) Nicola Pietrangeli (United Kingdom) Shirley Brasher Bloomer	9	6	6
(Australia) Robert Howe (Australia) Lorraine Coghlan Robinson	7	8	2

== Wimbledon ==
=== Men's singles ===
Longest match by time and number of games
2010 first round, 183 games, 11 hours and 5 minutes.
(United States) John Isner	6	3	6^{7}	7^{7}	70
(France) Nicolas Mahut	4	6	7^{9}	6^{3}	68

Note: This is the longest professional tennis match ever played.

Longest singles final match by time played
2019, 4 hours and 57 minutes
(Serbia) Novak Djokovic	7^{7}	1	7^{7}	4	13^{7}
(Switzerland) Roger Federer	6^{5}	6	6^{4}	6	12^{3}

Longest singles final match by number of games
2009, 77 games
(Switzerland) Roger Federer	5	7^{8}	7^{7}	3	16
(United States) Andy Roddick	7	6^{6}	6^{5}	6	14

Note: This match also had the longest final set in a Grand Slam final by games.

Longest singles semifinal match by time and number of games
2018, 99 games, 6 hours and 36 minutes
(South Africa) Kevin Anderson	7^{8}	6^{5}	6^{9}	6	26
(United States) John Isner	6^{6}	7^{7}	7^{11}	4	24

Longest singles quarter-final match by time
2026, 57 games, 5 hours and 15 minutes
(Serbia) Novak Djokovic	7^{12}	3	6	6^{4}	7^{10}
(Canada) Felix Auger-Aliassime	6^{10}	6	3	7^{7}	6^{4}

=== Men's doubles ===
==== Best-of-three-sets system ====
Longest doubles final match by number of games and time, using tiebreaker scoring
2024 final, 39 games, 2 hours and 49 minutes
(Finland) Harri Heliövaara (United Kingdom) Henry Patten	6^{7}	7^{10}	7^{11}
(Australia) Max Purcell (Australia) Jordan Thompson	7^{9}	6^{8}	6^{9}

==== Best-of-five-sets system ====
Longest doubles final match by time played
1992, 5 hours and 1 minute
(United States) John McEnroe (Germany) Michael Stich	5	7^{7}	3	7^{7}	19
(United States) Jim Grabb (United States) Richey Reneberg	7	6^{5}	6	6^{5}	17

Note: Also the longest doubles final by number of games (83).

Longest match by time played
2006 quarterfinals, 6 hours and 9 minutes
(The Bahamas) Mark Knowles (Canada) Daniel Nestor	5	6	6^{5}	6	23
(Sweden) Simon Aspelin (Australia) Todd Perry	7	3	7^{7}	3	21

Longest match by number of games, before the tiebreaker introduction
1966 first round, 98 games
(Socialist Federal Republic of Yugoslavia) Nikola Pilić (United States) Gene Scott	19	12	6	4	9
(United States) Cliff Richey (Denmark) Torben Ulrich	21	10	4	6	7

Longest match by number of games, using tiebreaker scoring
2007 third round 102 games
(Brazil) Marcelo Melo (Brazil) André Sá	5	7^{7}	4	7^{9}	28
(Australia) Paul Hanley (Zimbabwe) Kevin Ullyett	7	6^{4}	6	6^{7}	26

Longest doubles final match by number of games, before the tiebreaker introduction
1968, 70 games
(Australia) John Newcombe (Australia) Tony Roche	3	8	5	14	6
(Australia) Ken Rosewall (Australia) Fred Stolle	6	6	7	12	3

=== Women's singles ===
Longest match by time played
1995 second round, 3 hours and 45 minutes
(United States) Chanda Rubin	7^{7}	6^{5}	17
(Canada) Patricia Hy-Boulais	6^{4}	7^{7}	15

Note: Note: The Bud Collins History of Tennis incorrectly lists this match as having occurred in 1996

Longest match by number of games, before the tiebreaker introduction
1948 second round, 54 games
(France) Alice Weiwers	8	14	6
(United States) Rita Anderson	10	12	4

Longest match by number of games, using tiebreaker scoring
1995 second round, 58 games
(United States) Chanda Rubin	7^{7}	6^{5}	17
(Canada) Patricia Hy-Boulais	6^{4}	7^{7}	15

Longest singles final match by time played
2005, 2 hours and 45 minutes
(United States) Venus Williams	4	7^{7}	9
(United States) Lindsay Davenport	6	6^{4}	7

Longest singles final match by number of games, before the tiebreaker introduction
1970, 46 games
(Australia) Margaret Court	14	11
(United States) Billie Jean King	12	9

=== Women's doubles ===
Longest match by number of games, before the tiebreaker introduction
1933 first round, 48 games
(United Kingdom) Pat Brazier (United Kingdom) Christabel Wheatcroft	11	5	9
(United Kingdom) Mildred Nonweiler (United Kingdom) Betty Soames	9	7	7

Longest match by number of games, before the tiebreaker introduction
1933 final, 38 games
(France) Simonne Mathieu (United States) Elizabeth Ryan	6	9	6
(United Kingdom) Freda James (United Kingdom) Billie Yorke	2	11	4

1967 final, 38 games
(United States) Billie Jean King (United States) Rosemary Casals	9	6	6
(Brazil) Maria Bueno (United States) Nancy Richey Gunter	11	4	2

=== Mixed doubles ===
Longest match by number of games, before the tiebreaker introduction
1967 quarterfinals, 56 games
(Australia) Ken Fletcher (Australia) Margaret Court	6	7	16
(Soviet Union) Alex Metreveli (Soviet Union) Anna Dmitrieva	8	5	14

Longest match by number of games, before the tiebreaker introduction
1949 final, 48 games
(South Africa) Eric Sturgess (South Africa) Sheila Piercey Summers	9	9	7
(Australia) John Bromwich (United States) Louise Brough Clapp	7	11	5

== US Open ==
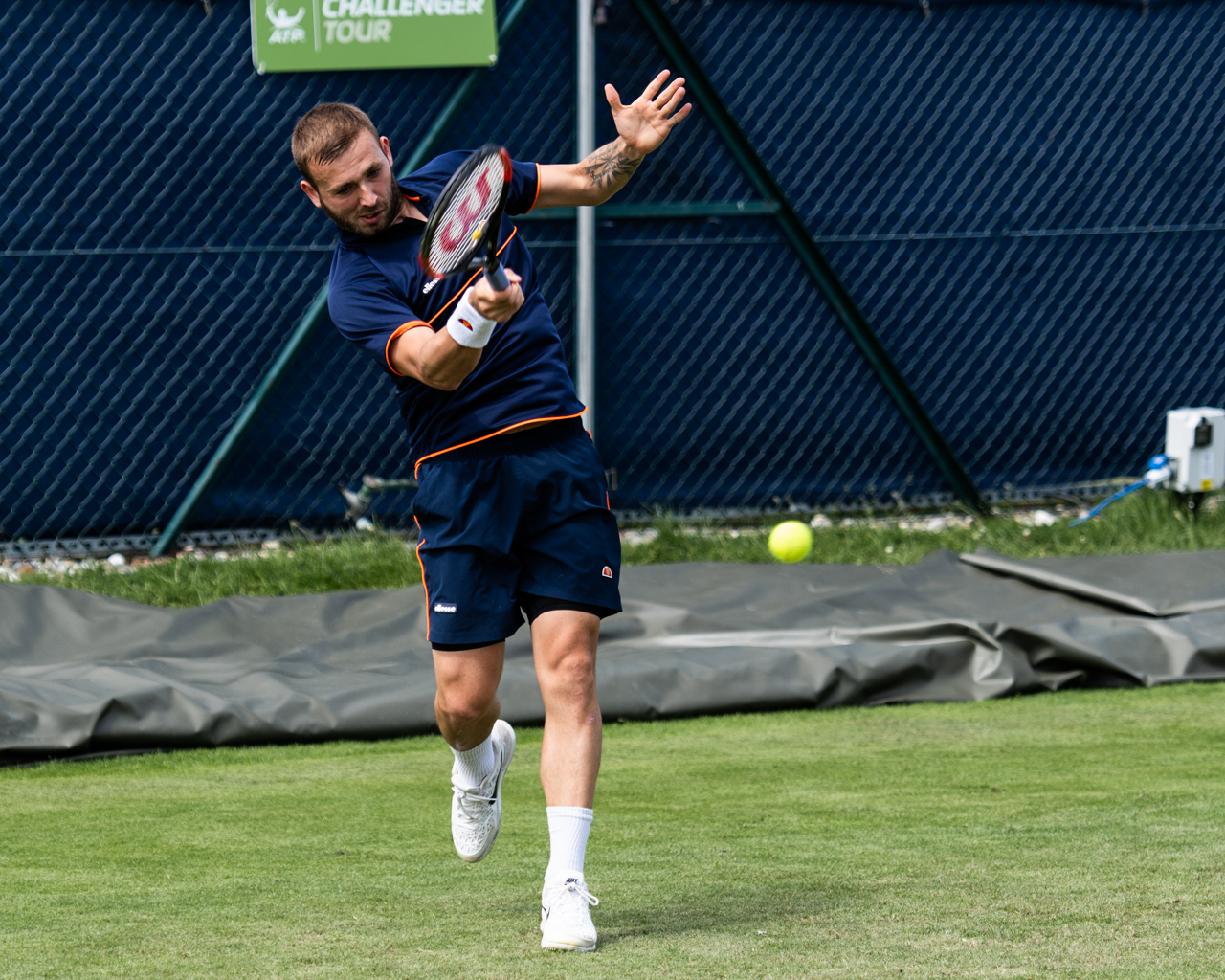
Dan Evans's (pictured in 2018) 2024 victory over Karen Khachanov 6–7^{(6–8)}, 7–6^{(7–2)}, 7–6^{(7–4)}, 4–6, 6–4, becoming the longest match in 5 hours 35 minutes.

=== Men's singles ===
Longest match by time played
2024 first round, 5 hours and 35 minutes
(United Kingdom) Dan Evans	6^{6}	7^{7}	7^{7}	4	6
Karen Khachanov	7^{8}	6^{2}	6^{4}	6	4

Longest match by number of games, before the tiebreaker introduction
1969 first round, 100 games
(United States) Franklin Robbins	22	9	6	8	6
(United States) Donald Dell	20	7	8	10	4

Longest match by number of games, using tiebreaker scoring
1979 second round, 63 games
(United Kingdom) John Lloyd	5	6	7	7	7
(Australia) Paul McNamee	7	7	5	6	6

Longest singles final match by number of games, before the tiebreaker introduction
1949, 67 games
(United States) Pancho Gonzales	16	2	6	6	6
(United States) Ted Schroeder	18	6	1	2	4

Longest singles final match by time played
1988, 4 hours and 54 minutes
(Sweden) Mats Wilander	6	4	6	5	6
(Czechoslovakia) Ivan Lendl	4	6	3	7	4

2012, 4 hours and 54 minutes
(United Kingdom) Andy Murray	7^{12}	7	2	3	6
(Serbia) Novak Djokovic	6^{10}	5	6	6	2

=== Men's doubles ===
Longest match by number of games, before the tiebreaker introduction
1966 third round, 105 games
(Mexico) Marcelo Lara (Mexico) Joaquín Loyo-Mayo	10	24	11	3	6
(Spain) Manuel Santana (Mexico) Luis-Augusto García	12	22	9	6	2

1967 quarterfinals, 105 games
(South Africa) Cliff Drysdale (South Africa) Ray Moore	29	8	3	8	6
(Australia) Roy Emerson (Brazil) Ron Barnes	31	6	6	6	2

Longest doubles final match by number of games, before the tiebreaker introduction
1946, 74 games
(United States) Gardnar Mulloy (United States) William Talbert	3	6	2	6	20
(United States) Frank Guernsey (United States) Don McNeill	6	4	6	3	18

=== Women's singles ===
Longest match by time played
2021, 3 hours and 40 minutes
(Spain) Rebeka Masarova	6^{9}	7^{7}	7^{11}
(Romania) Ana Bogdan	7^{11}	6^{2}	6^{9}

2021, 3 hours and 40 minutes
(Belgium) Elise Mertens	3	7^{7}	7^{7}
(Sweden) Rebecca Peterson	6	6^{5}	6^{5}

Note: Note: The above two matches were played on the same day (31 August) and started at almost exactly the same time.

==== Best-of-five-sets system ====
Longest match by number of games, before the tiebreaker introduction
1898 challenge round, 51 games
(United States) Juliette Atkinson	6	5	6	2	7
(United States) Marion Jones	3	7	4	6	5

==== Best-of-three-sets system ====
Longest match by number of games, using tiebreaker scoring
1985 quarterfinal, 39 games
(West Germany) Steffi Graf	7	6	7
(United States) Pam Shriver	6	7	6

=== Women's doubles ===
Longest doubles final match by number of games, before the tiebreaker introduction
1920, 43 games
(United States) Eleanor Goss (United States) Marion Zinderstein	13	4	6
(United States) Helen Baker (United States) Eleanor Tennant	11	6	3

=== Mixed doubles ===
Longest mixed doubles final match by number of games, before the tiebreaker introduction
1959, 48 games
(Australia) Neale Fraser (United States) Margaret Osborne duPont	7	13	6
(Australia) Bob Mark (United States) Janet Hopps Adkisson	5	15	2

== Summer Olympics ==
- Note: The International Olympic Committee does not recognise records in tennis. Therefore, all the records listed below are unofficial.

=== Overall ===
Longest match by number of games, before the tiebreaker introduction
1920 semifinals, 76 games (5 hrs 45 minutes) (See Note)
(United Kingdom) Gordon Lowe	14	8	5	6	6
(Greece) Augustos Zerlendis	12	10	7	4	4

Note: World Tennis Magazine state that some media outlets have reported [this match] lasting approximately six hours. Lawn Tennis and Badminton (28 August 1920) reports that the match was played in three stanzas due to fading light and mealtimes, being 1730-1930 on Sunday 15 August, then “shortly after eleven o’clock on the Monday morning” until 1230 (lunch break). The final stanza lasted 1400-1615 the same afternoon. This match therefore could have been the longest Olympic tennis match in terms of match duration as well as being the longest Olympic tennis match in terms of number of games.

Longest match by number of games, using tiebreaker scoring
2012 second round, 66 games (3 h 57 min)
(France) Jo-Wilfried Tsonga	6	3	25
(Canada) Milos Raonic	3	6	23

Note: Match played on 31 July 2012. Beating the previous record of 61 games set during the five set doubles final in 1988. The third set also set a record for most games played in a set at an Olympics, beating the previous record set at the 2004 Summer Olympics by Fernando González and Taylor Dent, 30 games, by 18 games.

Longest match by time played, after the tiebreaker introduction
1992 first round, 5 h and 53 min (56 games)
(Germany) Boris Becker	3	7^{7}	5	7^{7}	6
(Norway) Christian Ruud	6	6^{2}	7	6^{2}	3

Note: Tsonga vs. Raonic above (best-of-three-sets system) was longer by number of games.

=== Men's singles ===
==== Best-of-three-sets system ====
Longest match by time played
2012 semifinals, 4 h and 26 min (58 games)
(Switzerland) Roger Federer	3	7^{7}	19
(Argentina) Juan Martín del Potro	6	6^{5}	17

Note: Match played on 3 August 2012. This is also the longest best-of-three-sets men's singles match ever played in the Open era (with or without a tiebreaker in the final set).

Longest match by number of games, using tiebreaker scoring
2012 second round, 66 games (3 h 57 min)
(France) Jo-Wilfried Tsonga	6	3	25
(Canada) Milos Raonic	3	6	23

Note: Match played on 31 July 2012. Beating the previous record of 61 games set during the five set doubles final in 1988. The third set also set a record for most games played in a set at an Olympics, beating the previous record set at the 2004 Summer Olympics by Fernando González and Taylor Dent, 30 games, by 18 games.

Longest singles final match by time played
2024 final, 2 h and 50 min
(Serbia) Novak Djokovic	7^{7}	7^{7}
(Spain) Carlos Alcaraz	6^{3}	6^{2}

==== Best-of-five-sets system ====
Longest match by number of games, before the tiebreaker introduction
1920 semifinals, 76 games (6 hrs?) (See Note)
(United Kingdom) Gordon Lowe	14	8	5	6	6
(Greece) Augustos Zerlendis	12	10	7	4	4

Note: World Tennis Magazine states that some media outlets have reported this match lasting approximately six hours. By that yardstick, this match could have been the longest Olympic tennis match in terms of match duration as well as being the longest Olympic tennis match in terms of number of games.

Longest match by time played, after the tiebreaker introduction
1992 first round, 5 h and 53 min (56 games)
(Germany) Boris Becker	3	7^{7}	5	7^{7}	6
(Norway) Christian Ruud	6	6^{2}	7	6^{2}	3

Note: Tsonga vs. Raonic above (best-of-three-sets system) was longer by number of games.

=== Men's doubles ===
Longest match by time played
2008 semifinals, 4 h and 44 min (59 games)
(Sweden) Simon Aspelin (Sweden) Thomas Johansson	7^{8}	4	19
(France) Arnaud Clément (France) Michaël Llodra	6^{6}	6	17

Longest match by number of games, using tiebreaker scoring
2012 second round, 63 games
(Brazil) Marcelo Melo (Brazil) Bruno Soares	1	6	24
(Czech Republic) Tomáš Berdych (Czech Republic) Radek Štěpánek	6	4	22

Note: This match was played on 1 August 2012, only a day after Jo-Wilfried Tsonga vs. Milos Raonic set the record of 66 games in a best-of-three-sets match.

=== Women's singles ===
Longest match by number of games, using tiebreaker scoring
1988 second round, 42 games
(Soviet Union) Larisa Savchenko	6^{3}	7^{7}	9
(United Kingdom) Sara Gomer	7^{7}	6^{3}	7

Longest match by number of games, using tiebreaker scoring
2004 first round, 42 games
(Argentina) Paola Suárez	7^{7}	6^{5}	9
(France) Nathalie Dechy	6^{1}	7^{7}	7

=== Women's doubles ===
Longest match by number of games, using tiebreaker scoring
1988 first round, 63 games
(Canada) Carling Bassett-Seguso (Canada) Jill Hetherington	7^{10}	5	20
(Argentina) Mercedes Paz (Argentina) Gabriela Sabatini	6^{8}	7	18

=== Mixed doubles ===
Longest match by number of games, before the tiebreaker introduction
1924 second round, 42 games
(Republic of Ireland) Hilda Wallis (Republic of Ireland) Edwin McCrea	9	4	9
(India) Nora Polley (India) Sydney Jacob	7	6	7

== Davis Cup and Fed Cup ==
=== Davis Cup ===
Longest rubber by duration
2015 World Group first round, Argentina vs. Brazil. 6 hours and 43 minutes
(Argentina) Leonardo Mayer	7^{7}	7^{7}	5	5	15
(Brazil) João Souza	6^{4}	6^{5}	7	7	13

Longest rubber by number of games (singles)
1982 American Zone semifinal, Canada vs. Venezuela, 100 games
(Canada) Harry Fritz	16	11	9	4	11
(Venezuela) Jorge Andrew	14	9	11	6	9

Longest rubber by duration
2013 World Group first round, Switzerland vs Czech Republic, 7 hours and 1 minute
(Switzerland) Stanislas Wawrinka (Switzerland) Marco Chiudinelli	4	7	4	7	22
(Czech Republic) Tomáš Berdych (Czech Republic) Lukáš Rosol	6	5	6	6	24

Longest rubber by number of games (doubles)
Doubles of the 1973 American Zone Final, Chile vs. USA, 122 games
(United States) Stan Smith (United States) Erik van Dillen	7	37	8	6	6
(Chile) Patricio Cornejo (Chile) Jaime Fillol	9	39	6	1	3

Note: The 39–37 second set is the longest set in Davis Cup history (76 games).

=== Fed Cup ===
Longest rubber by duration
2016 World Group first round, Netherlands vs. Russia, 4 hours
(Netherlands) Richèl Hogenkamp	7^{7}	5	10
(Russia) Svetlana Kuznetsova	6^{4}	7	8

Longest rubber by number of games (singles)
1997 World Group first round, France vs. Japan, 54 games
(France) Nathalie Tauziat	7	4	17
(Japan) Naoko Sawamatsu	5	6	15

Longest rubber by duration
2001 Europe/Africa Group I deciding match, Israel vs. Luxembourg, 3 hours and 35 minutes
(Israel) Tzipi Obziler (Israel) Hila Rosen	3	7	10
(Luxembourg) Anne Kremer (Luxembourg) Claudine Schaul	6	6	8

Longest rubber by number of games (doubles)
1968 World Group semifinal, Australia vs. Great Britain, 51 games
(Australia) Margaret Court (Australia) Kerry Melville	9	3	14
(United Kingdom) Winnie Shaw (United Kingdom) Virginia Wade	7	6	12

== Tour Finals ==
=== ATP Tour Finals ===
==== Best-of-five-sets system ====
Longest singles final match by number of games, using tiebreaker scoring
1996, 58 games
(United States) Pete Sampras	3	7^{7}	7^{7}	6^{11}	6
(Germany) Boris Becker	6	6^{5}	6^{4}	7^{13}	4

Longest match by number of games, using tiebreaker scoring
1986 round robin, 57 games
(France) Guy Forget (France) Yannick Noah	6	6	3	7	7
(United States) Mike de Palmer (United States) Gary Donnelly	7	4	6	6	5

1987 round robin, 57 games
(United States) Paul Annacone (South Africa) Christo van Rensburg	7	7	2	4	7
(Australia) Peter Doohan (Australia) Laurie Warder	6	6	6	6	6

==== Best-of-three-sets system ====
Longest match by time played
2016 semi final, 3 hours 38 minutes
(United Kingdom) Andy Murray	5	7^{7}	7^{11}
(Canada) Milos Raonic	7	6^{5}	6^{9}

Note: This was the longest match since 1991 when times were first recorded.

=== ATP Next Gen Tour Finals ===
Longest match by time played
2022 Next Generation ATP Finals round robin, 2 hours and 38 minutes
(Italy) Francesco Passaro	4^{9}	2	3^{4}	4^{7}	4^{10}
(Italy) Matteo Arnaldi	3^{7}	4	4^{7}	3^{4}	3^{8}

Longest final match by time played
2023 Next Generation ATP Finals, 2 hours and 12 minutes
(Serbia) Hamad Medjedovic	3^{6}	4	4	3^{9}	4
(France) Arthur Fils	4^{8}	1	2	4^{11}	1

=== WTA Tour Finals ===
==== Best-of-five-sets system ====
Longest match by time played
1990 final, 3 hours and 47 minutes
(Socialist Federal Republic of Yugoslavia) Monica Seles	6	5	3	6	6
(Argentina) Gabriela Sabatini	4	7	6	4	2

==== Best-of-three-sets system ====
Longest match by time played 2012 round robin, 3 hours and 29 minutes: (Poland) Agnieszka Radwańska / 6^{6} / 7 / 6; (Italy) Sara Errani / 7^{8} / 5 / 4	Longest match by number of games 2017 round robin, 37 games: (United States) Venus Williams / 7 / 6^{3} / 7; (Latvia) Jeļena Ostapenko / 5 / 7^{7} / 5

== ATP/WTA 1000 Series ==
=== Men's singles ===
==== Best-of-five-sets system ====
Longest singles final match by time played 2005 Rome final, 5 hours and 15 minutes: (Spain) Rafael Nadal / 6 / 3 / 6 / 4 / 7^{8}; (Argentina) Guillermo Coria / 4 / 6 / 3 / 6 / 6^{6}	Longest singles final match by number of games 2006 Rome final, 57 games: (Spain) Rafael Nadal / 6^{0} / 7^{7} / 6 / 2 / 7^{7}; (Switzerland) Roger Federer / 7^{7} / 6^{5} / 4 / 6 / 6^{5}

==== Best-of-three-sets system ====
Longest singles final match by time played 2023 Cincinnati final, 3 hours and 49 minutes: (Serbia) Novak Djokovic / 5 / 7^{9} / 7^{7}; (Spain) Carlos Alcaraz / 7 / 6^{7} / 6^{4}	Longest match by time played 2009 Madrid semifinal, 4 hours and 2 minutes: (Spain) Rafael Nadal / 3 / 7^{7} / 7^{11}; (Serbia) Novak Djokovic / 6 / 6^{5} / 6^{9}

=== Women's singles ===
Longest match by time played
2024 China Open first round, 4 hours and 15 minutes
(Spain) Sara Sorribes Tormo	6^{4}	7	7
(China) Gao Xinyu	7^{7}	5	5

== See also ==
- Tennis statistics
- Shortest tennis match records
- Longest tiebreaker in tennis
