= 1980 Central Fidelity Banks International =

- Date: July 21–27
- Edition: 2nd
- Category: Colgate Series (AA)
- Draw: 32S / 16D
- Prize money: $100,000
- Surface: Carpet (Note: Sporteze.) / indoor
- Location: Richmond, Virginia, U.S.
- Venue: Robins Center

Champions

Singles
- (United States) Martina Navratilova

Doubles
- (United States) Billie Jean King (United States) Martina Navratilova
← 1979 ·	Central Fidelity Banks International	· 1981 →

The 1980 Central Fidelity Banks International was a women's singles tennis tournament played on indoor carpet courts at the Robins Center in Richmond, Virginia in the United States. The event was part of the AA (Note: Tournaments with prize money for the women of at least $100,000.) category of the 1980 Colgate Series. It was the second edition of the tournament and was held from July 21 through July 27, 1980. First-seeded Martina Navratilova won the singles title and earned $20,000 first-prize money.

== Finals ==
=== Singles ===
(United States) Martina Navratilova defeated (United States) Mary-Lou Piatek 6–3, 6–0

- It was Navratilova's 10th singles title of the year and the 44th of her career.

=== Doubles ===
(United States) Billie Jean King / (United States) Martina Navratilova defeated (United States) Pam Shriver / (United States) Anne Smith 6–4, 4–6, 6–3

== Prize money ==
Event	W	F	SF	QF	Round of 16	Round of 32
Singles	$20,000	$10,000	$4,800	$2,100	$1,100	$550
