= 1995 French Open – Women's singles =

Women's singles
- 1995 French Open

Final
- Champion: (Germany) Steffi Graf
- Runner-up: (Spain) Arantxa Sánchez Vicario
- Score: 7–5, 4–6, 6–0

Details
- Draw: 128
- Seeds: 16

Events
Singles	men	women		boys	girls
Doubles	men	women	mixed	boys	girls
WC Singles	men	women	quad
WC Doubles	men	women	quad
Legends	−45	45+	women
← 1994 ·	French Open	· 1996 →

Steffi Graf defeated defending champion Arantxa Sánchez Vicario in the final, 7–5, 4–6, 6–0 to win the women's singles tennis title at the 1995 French Open. It was her fourth French Open singles title and 16th major singles title overall. Sánchez Vicario lost the world No. 1 ranking to Graf following the tournament, and would never recapture it.

The match between Virginie Buisson and Noëlle van Lottum was the longest women's match at a major at the time, spanning 4 hours and 7 minutes. This record would later be broken by Barbora Záhlavová-Strýcová and Regina Kulikova in the 2010 Australian Open.

The tournament marked the first major appearance of future world No. 1 and two-time major champion Amélie Mauresmo.

== Seeds ==
1. (Spain) Arantxa Sánchez Vicario (final)
2. (Germany) Steffi Graf (champion)
3. (France) Mary Pierce (fourth round)
4. (Spain) Conchita Martínez (semifinals)
5. (Czech Republic) Jana Novotná (third round)
6. (Bulgaria) Magdalena Maleeva (second round)
7. (United States) Lindsay Davenport (fourth round)
8. (Argentina) Gabriela Sabatini (quarterfinals)
9. (Japan) Kimiko Date (semifinals)
10. (Belarus) Natasha Zvereva (first round)
11. (Germany) Anke Huber (fourth round)
12. (Croatia) Iva Majoli (quarterfinals)
13. (United States) Mary Joe Fernández (first round)
14. (United States) Amy Frazier (third round)
15. (Czech Republic) Helena Suková (first round)
16. (Japan) Naoko Sawamatsu (third round)

== Draw ==
=== Key ===
- Q = Qualifier
- WC = Wild card
- LL = Lucky loser
- Alt = Alternate
- ITF = ITF entry
- PR = Protected ranking
- SR = Special ranking
- SE = Special exempt
- JE = Junior exempt
- JR = Junior Accelerator Programme entrant
- CO = College Accelerator Programme entrant
- NG = Next Gen Accelerator Program entrant
- w/o = Walkover
- r = Retired
- d = Defaulted

=== Finals ===
Quarterfinals
1	(Spain) Arantxa Sánchez Vicario	6	6
(United States) Chanda Rubin	3	1
12	(Croatia) Iva Majoli	5	1
9	(Japan) Kimiko Date	7	6
(Spain) Virginia Ruano Pascual	0	4
4	(Spain) Conchita Martínez	6	6
8	(Argentina) Gabriela Sabatini	1	0
2	(Germany) Steffi Graf	6	6

Semifinals
1	(Spain) Arantxa Sánchez Vicario	7	6
9	(Japan) Kimiko Date	5	3
4	(Spain) Conchita Martínez	3	7^{7}	3
2	(Germany) Steffi Graf	6	6^{5}	6

Final
1	(Spain) Arantxa Sánchez Vicario	5	6	0
2	(Germany) Steffi Graf	7	4	6

=== Top half ===
==== Section 1 ====
First round
1	(Spain) A Sánchez Vicario	6	6
(South Korea) Park S-h	1	0
(France) S Pitkowski	6	6
(Belarus) T Ignatieva	3	4
(Germany) S Meier	6	6
(United States) S Cacic	4	3
(Austria) B Reinstadler	6	6
(United States) Z Garrison-Jackson	4	3
(Austria) B Paulus	4	2
(United States) D Graham	6	6
(Israel) A Smashnova	6	6
(Germany) M Kochta	1	2
(Slovakia) K Habšudová	6	6
(Sweden) M Strandlund	2	2
(Ukraine) N Medvedeva	1	0
14	(United States) A Frazier	6	6

Second round
1	(Spain) A Sánchez Vicario	6	6
(France) S Pitkowski	3	0
(Germany) S Meier	4	3
(Austria) B Reinstadler	6	6
(United States) D Graham	3	4
(Israel) A Smashnova	6	6
(Slovakia) K Habšudová	2	4
14	(United States) A Frazier	6	6

Third round
1	(Spain) A Sánchez Vicario	6	6
(Austria) B Reinstadler	3	1
(Israel) A Smashnova	6	6
14	(United States) A Frazier	1	2

Fourth round
1	(Spain) A Sánchez Vicario	6	6
(Israel) A Smashnova	4	0

==== Section 2 ====
First round
15	(Czech Republic) H Suková	6	3	7
(Japan) A Sugiyama	4	6	9
(United States) S Stafford	4	3
(Belgium) L Courtois	6	6
WC	(France) A-G Sidot	3	2
(United States) J Watanabe	6	6
(France) L Ghirardi	7	6
(Argentina) M Paz	5	1
(United States) C Rubin	7^{8}	6
(Russia) E Makarova	6^{6}	3
(Germany) M Babel	6	6
(Netherlands) S Rottier	3	4
(Slovakia) R Zrubáková	4	2
(Austria) P Schwarz	6	6
(Austria) S Dopfer	1	6	1
5	(Czech Republic) J Novotná	6	2	6

Second round
(Japan) A Sugiyama	6	6
(Belgium) L Courtois	1	3
(United States) J Watanabe	6	3	6
(France) L Ghirardi	1	6	4
(United States) C Rubin	6	6
(Germany) M Babel	3	2
(Austria) P Schwarz	4	3
5	(Czech Republic) J Novotná	6	6

Third round
(Japan) A Sugiyama	6	6
(United States) J Watanabe	3	2
(United States) C Rubin	7^{10}	4	8
5	(Czech Republic) J Novotná	6^{8}	6	6

Fourth round
(Japan) A Sugiyama	2	6	2
(United States) C Rubin	6	1	6

==== Section 3 ====
First round
3	(France) M Pierce	6	6
(Australia) N Bradtke	1	3
(Australia) K Radford	1	6	2
(Germany) C Singer	6	1	6
(France) A Dechaume-Balleret	2	3
(Belgium) D Van Roost	6	6
(Argentina) F Labat	6	6
(Germany) W Probst	3	4
(Bulgaria) K Maleeva	4	6	2
(Chinese Taipei) Wang S-t	6	3	6
(Russia) E Likhovtseva	7^{10}	6
(Sweden) Å Carlsson	6^{8}	2
(Bulgaria) E Pampoulova	0	5
Q	(Argentina) MJ Gaidano	6	7
(Japan) M Endo	3	3
12	(Croatia) I Majoli	6	6

Second round
3	(France) M Pierce	7	6
(Germany) C Singer	5	0
(Belgium) D Van Roost	6	2	0
(Argentina) F Labat	1	6	6
(Chinese Taipei) Wang S-t	6	6
(Russia) E Likhovtseva	1	2
Q	(Argentina) MJ Gaidano	1	0
12	(Croatia) I Majoli	6	6

Third round
3	(France) M Pierce	6	6
(Argentina) F Labat	2	2
(Chinese Taipei) Wang S-t	5	2
12	(Croatia) I Majoli	7	6

Fourth round
3	(France) M Pierce	2	3
12	(Croatia) I Majoli	6	6

==== Section 4 ====
First round
9	(Japan) K Date	6	6
(Czech Republic) L Richterová	2	2
WC	(France) N van Lottum	7^{7}	5	2
WC	(France) V Buisson	6^{3}	7	6
(Hungary) A Temesvári	4	5
(United States) M McGrath	6	7
(Poland) K Nowak	6	6
(United States) K Po	2	4
(South Africa) M de Swardt	6	6
WC	(France) N Dechy	1	4
(Switzerland) M Hingis	2	6	7
(Austria) J Wiesner	6	3	5
Q	(United States) E deLone	5	6	6
(France) S Testud	7	3	8
(Hong Kong) Tang M	6^{4}	0
7	(United States) L Davenport	7^{7}	6

Second round
9	(Japan) K Date	6	6
WC	(France) V Buisson	2	1
(United States) M McGrath	2	6	3
(Poland) K Nowak	6	1	6
(South Africa) M de Swardt	1	7^{7}	2
(Switzerland) M Hingis	6	6^{3}	6
(France) S Testud	3	5
7	(United States) L Davenport	6	7

Third round
9	(Japan) K Date	6	6
(Poland) K Nowak	1	3
(Switzerland) M Hingis	6	2	2
7	(United States) L Davenport	4	6	6

Fourth round
9	(Japan) K Date	6	6
7	(United States) L Davenport	4	3

=== Bottom half ===
==== Section 5 ====
First round
6	(Bulgaria) M Maleeva	6	6
(United States) N Arendt	3	4
(France) N Tauziat	6	6
(Japan) Y Kamio	1	2
(France) I Demongeot	6^{6}	2
(Spain) V Ruano Pascual	7^{8}	6
(Italy) S Farina	4	3
(United States) P Fendick	6	6
Q	(Finland) P Thorén	3	0
(Romania) R Dragomir	6	6
WC	(France) A Cocheteux	6^{3}	6	3
(United States) L Harvey-Wild	7^{7}	4	6
(Slovenia) T Križan	2	5
(Belgium) N Feber	6	7
WC	(France) N Herreman	4	1
16	(Japan) N Sawamatsu	6	6

Second round
6	(Bulgaria) M Maleeva	6	4	5
(France) N Tauziat	4	6	7
(Spain) V Ruano Pascual	7	6
(United States) P Fendick	5	1
(Romania) R Dragomir	6	4	6
(United States) L Harvey-Wild	1	6	1
(Belgium) N Feber	6^{4}	6	5
16	(Japan) N Sawamatsu	7^{7}	1	7

Third round
(France) N Tauziat	2	6^{4}
(Spain) V Ruano Pascual	6	7^{7}
(Romania) R Dragomir	4	7^{7}	6
16	(Japan) N Sawamatsu	6	6^{5}	2

Fourth round
(Spain) V Ruano Pascual	2	6	6
(Romania) R Dragomir	6	0	3

==== Section 6 ====
First round
13	(United States) MJ Fernandez	4	3
Q	(Argentina) P Suárez	6	6
(Germany) B Rittner	5	5
(Italy) A Serra Zanetti	7	7
LL	(Germany) V Martinek	6	6
(Mexico) A Gavaldón	4	4
(Canada) P Hy-Boulais	6	6
(Slovakia) K Studeníková	3	0
(Spain) N Ávila Bonastre	4	1
(United States) A Grossman	6	6
(France) A Fusai	6	4	3
(France) J Halard	2	6	6
WC	(France) C Dhenin	6^{2}	6^{4}
(Netherlands) M Oremans	7^{7}	7^{7}
(Germany) S Hack	0	0
4	(Spain) C Martínez	6	6

Second round
Q	(Argentina) P Suárez	2	3
(Italy) A Serra Zanetti	6	6
LL	(Germany) V Martinek	6	6
(Canada) P Hy-Boulais	1	0
(United States) A Grossman	4	6	2
(France) J Halard	6	3	6
(Netherlands) M Oremans	2	3
4	(Spain) C Martínez	6	6

Third round
(Italy) A Serra Zanetti	6	6
LL	(Germany) V Martinek	4	3
(France) J Halard	1	2
4	(Spain) C Martínez	6	6

Fourth round
(Italy) A Serra Zanetti	0	1
4	(Spain) C Martínez	6	6

==== Section 7 ====
First round
8	(Argentina) G Sabatini	6	6
(Czech Republic) R Bobková	2	0
(Germany) S Frankl	0	4
(South Africa) A Coetzer	6	6
(United States) A Keller	0	1
(Romania) I Spîrlea	6	6
(United States) M Werdel-Witmeyer	4	1
WC	(France) C Mothes-Jobkel	6	6
(Japan) K Nagatsuka	7^{7}	6
(South Africa) E Reinach	6^{3}	3
Q	(Belgium) E Callens	4	6	6
(Indonesia) Y Basuki	6	3	1
(South Africa) J Kruger	6	6
(Germany) K Kschwendt	3	4
Q	(Romania) C Cristea	1	7	6
10	(Belarus) N Zvereva	6	5	3

Second round
8	(Argentina) G Sabatini	7	6
(South Africa) A Coetzer	5	3
(Romania) I Spîrlea	6	6
WC	(France) C Mothes-Jobkel	0	1
(Japan) K Nagatsuka	4	6	6
Q	(Belgium) E Callens	6	4	4
(South Africa) J Kruger	3	4
Q	(Romania) C Cristea	6	6

Third round
8	(Argentina) G Sabatini	6	6
(Romania) I Spîrlea	3	4
(Japan) K Nagatsuka	6	6
Q	(Romania) C Cristea	3	2

Fourth round
8	(Argentina) G Sabatini	6	6
(Japan) K Nagatsuka	3	0

==== Section 8 ====
First round
11	(Germany) A Huber	6	7
Q	(Austria) B Schett	3	5
(Latvia) L Neiland	6	3	4
(Netherlands) B Schultz	1	6	6
(Italy) A-M Cecchini	3	4
(Belgium) S Appelmans	6	6
(United States) T Whitlinger-Jones	6	6
(Australia) R McQuillan	2	0
Q	(France) A Mauresmo	6	3	1
(Italy) N Baudone	1	6	6
(Argentina) P Tarabini	2	3
(Netherlands) K Boogert	6	6
(United States) L McNeil	6	2	0
(Germany) P Begerow	1	6	6
(Argentina) I Gorrochategui	1	5
2	(Germany) S Graf	6	7

Second round
11	(Germany) A Huber	6	6
(Netherlands) B Schultz	4	4
(Belgium) S Appelmans	7	4	6
(United States) T Whitlinger-Jones	5	6	3
(Italy) N Baudone	6	6
(Netherlands) K Boogert	4	4
(Germany) P Begerow	4	3
2	(Germany) S Graf	6	6

Third round
11	(Germany) A Huber	6	6
(Belgium) S Appelmans	0	3
(Italy) N Baudone	2	1
2	(Germany) S Graf	6	6

Fourth round
11	(Germany) A Huber	4	5
2	(Germany) S Graf	6	7

Preceded by 1995 Australian Open – Women's singles	Grand Slam women's singles	Succeeded by 1995 Wimbledon Championships – Women's singles
