= 1982 Central Fidelity Banks International =

- Date: December 6–12
- Edition: 4th
- Category: Toyota Series (4)
- Draw: 24S / 16D
- Prize money: $150,000
- Surface: Carpet (Note: Sporteze.) / indoor
- Location: Richmond, Virginia, U.S.
- Venue: Robins Center

Champions

Singles
- (Australia) Wendy Turnbull

Doubles
- (United States) Rosie Casals / (United States) Candy Reynolds
← 1981 ·	Central Fidelity Banks International	· 1983 →

The 1982 Central Fidelity Banks International was a women's singles tennis tournament played on indoor carpet courts at the Robins Center in Richmond, Virginia in the United States. The event was part of the Category 4 (Note: Tournaments with prize money for women of at least $125,000.) tier of the Toyota Series that was part of the 1982 WTA Tour. It was the fourth edition of the tournament and was held from December 6 through December 12, 1982. Second-seeded Wendy Turnbull won the singles title and earned $23,000 first-prize money.

== Finals ==
=== Singles ===
(Australia) Wendy Turnbull defeated (United States) Tracy Austin 6–7^{(3–7)}, 6–4, 6–2

- It was Turnbull's 2nd singles title of the year and the 9th of her career.

=== Doubles ===
(United States) Rosie Casals / (United States) Candy Reynolds defeated (United States) Jennifer Russell / (Romania) Virginia Ruzici 6–3, 6–4

== Prize money ==
Event	W	F	SF	QF	Round of 16	Round of 32
Singles	$23,000	$12,000	$6,375	$3,000	$1,450	$725
