= 1984 Central Fidelity Banks International =

- Date: September 24–30
- Edition: 6th
- Category: Ginny Circuit
- Draw: 32S / 16D
- Surface: Hard / outdoor
- Location: Richmond, Virginia, U.S.

Champions

Singles
- (United States) Joanne Russell

Doubles
- (Australia) Elizabeth Minter / (United States) Joanne Russell
| ← 1983 · | Central Fidelity Banks International |

The 1984 Central Fidelity Banks International was a women's tennis tournament played on outdoor hard courts in Richmond, Virginia in the United States that was part of the Ginny Circuit of the 1984 Virginia Slims World Championship Series. The tournament was held from September 24 through September 30, 1984. First-seeded Joanne Russell won the singles title.

This tournament was notable for featuring the longest women's singles match (by time) when Vicki Nelson took 6 hours, 31 minutes to defeat Jean Hepner 6–4, 7–6^{(13–11)} during the tournament's first round. The tiebreaker (1 hour, 47 minutes) featured a 29-minute, 643-shot rally, the longest in professional tennis history.

== Finals ==
=== Singles ===
(United States) Joanne Russell defeated (United States) Michaela Washington 6–3, 4–6, 6–2

- It was Russell's 3rd title of the year and the 5th of her career.

=== Doubles ===
(Australia) Elizabeth Minter / (United States) Joanne Russell defeated (South Africa) Jennifer Mundel-Reinbold / (United States) Felicia Raschiatore 6–4, 3–6, 7–6

- It was Minter's 2nd title of the year and of her career. It was Russell's 2nd title of the year and the 4th of her career.
