= 1979 Central Fidelity Banks International =

- Date: August 13–19
- Edition: 1st
- Category: Colgate Series (AAA)
- Draw: 32S / 16D
- Prize money: $100,000
- Surface: Carpet / indoor
- Location: Richmond, Virginia, U.S.
- Venue: Robins Center

Champions

Singles
- (United States) Martina Navratilova

Doubles
- (Netherlands) Betty Stöve / (Australia) Wendy Turnbull
Central Fidelity Banks International	· 1980 →

The 1979 Central Fidelity Banks International was a women's singles tennis tournament played on indoor carpet courts at the Robins Center in Richmond, Virginia in the United States. The event was part of the AAA (Note: Tournaments with prize money for the women of at least $100,000.) category of the 1979 Colgate Series. It was the inaugural edition of the tournament and was held from August 13 through August 19, 1979. First-seeded Martina Navratilova won the singles title and earned $20,000 first-prize money.

== Finals ==
=== Singles ===
(United States) Martina Navratilova defeated (United States) Kathy Jordan 6–1, 6–3

- It was Navratilova's 7th singles title of the year and the 31st of her career.

=== Doubles ===
(Netherlands) Betty Stöve / (Australia) Wendy Turnbull defeated (United States) Billie Jean King / (United States) Martina Navratilova 6–1, 6–4

== Prize money ==
Event	W	F	SF	QF	Round of 16	Round of 32
Singles	$20,000	$10,000	$5,300	$2,300	$1,200	$600
