= 1983 Central Fidelity Banks International =

- Date: September 19–25
- Edition: 5th
- Category: 3
- Draw: 32S / 16D
- Prize money: $150,000
- Surface: Carpet / indoor
- Location: Richmond, Virginia, U.S.
- Venue: Robins Center

Champions

Singles
- (South Africa) Rosalyn Fairbank

Doubles
- (South Africa) Rosalyn Fairbank / (United States) Candy Reynolds
← 1982 ·	Central Fidelity Banks International	· 1984 →

The 1983 Central Fidelity Banks International was a women's tennis tournament played on indoor carpet courts at the Robins Center in Richmond, Virginia in the United States that was part of the Category 3 tier of the 1983 Virginia Slims World Championship Series. It was the fifth edition of the tournament and was held from September 19 through September 25, 1983. Fifth-seeded Rosalyn Fairbank won the singles title and earned $30,000 first-prize money.

== Finals ==
=== Singles ===
(South Africa) Rosalyn Fairbank defeated (United States) Kathy Jordan 6–4, 5–7, 6–4

- It was Fairbank's 1st singles title of her career.

=== Doubles ===
(South Africa) Rosalyn Fairbank / (United States) Candy Reynolds defeated (United States) Kathy Jordan / (United States) Barbara Potter 6–7^{(3–7)}, 6–2, 6–1

- It was Fairbank's 4th title of the year and the 7th of her career. It was Reynolds' 6th title of the year and the 15th of her career.

== Prize money ==
Total prize money for the tournament was $150,000. The prize money for the doubles event is per team.

Event	W	F	SF	QF	Round of 16	Round of 32
Singles	$30,000	$15,000	$7,350	$3,600	$1,900	$1,100
Doubles	$11,000	$5,500	$3,000	$1,600	$750	—
