= Felicia Raschiatore =

American tennis player

- Full name: Felicia Raschiatore
- Country (sports): United States
- Born: December 31, 1961 (age 63)
- Prize money: $48,071

Singles

Grand Slam singles results
- French Open: 2R (1983)
- Wimbledon: 2R (1984)
- US Open: 1R (1982)

Doubles

Grand Slam doubles results
- French Open: QF (1984)
- Wimbledon: 3R (1984)
- US Open: 1R (1983, 1984)

Felicia Raschiatore (born December 31, 1961) is a former professional tennis player from the United States.

== Biography ==
Born in 1961, Raschiatore was coached by her father Felix from the age of 10.

She attended Trinity University in Texas before competing professionally in the 1980s.

Noted performances in her professional career include finishing runner-up to Yvonne Vermaak at the 1983 Virginia Slims of Utah and a win over Virginia Ruzici, the top seed at the 1984 Virginia Slims of Denver.

As a doubles player she was a finalist at the 1984 Central Fidelity Banks International in Richmond and made the women's doubles quarter-finals at the 1984 French Open, partnering Camille Benjamin.

== WTA Tour finals ==
=== Singles (0-1) ===
Result	Date	Tournament	Tier	Surface	Opponent	Score
Loss	Sep 1983	Salt Lake City, U.S.	Ginny ($50,000)	Hard	(South Africa) Yvonne Vermaak	2–6, 6–0, 5–7

=== Doubles (0–1) ===
Result	Date	Tournament	Tier	Surface	Partner	Opponents	Score
Loss	Sep 1984	Richmond, U.S.	Ginny ($50,000)	Hard	(South Africa) Jennifer Mundel-Reinbold	(Australia) Elizabeth Minter (United States) JoAnne Russell	4–6, 6–3, 6–7
