= Michaela Washington =

American tennis player

- Full name: Michaela Washington
- Country (sports): United States
- Born: 01/27/1966
- Prize money: $30,525

Grand Slam singles results
- Australian Open: 1R (1984)
- French Open: 1R (1985)
- Wimbledon: 1R (1985)

Michaela Washington (born February 27, 1966) is a former professional tennis player from the United States.

== Biography ==
The eldest sibling of a tennis playing family, Washington grew up in the state of Michigan. Both of her brothers, MaliVai and Mashiska, played on the ATP Tour. One of her two younger sisters, Mashona, also played tennis professionally.

In 1981 she won the USTA Amateur Championships.

Washington played briefly on the professional tour, in 1984 and 1985. Her most notable performance came at the 1984 Central Fidelity Banks International, where she was a losing finalist in the singles competition. She made the main draw of a grand slam tournament for the first time at the 1984 Australian Open, then appeared at both the French Open and Wimbledon in 1985. At Wimbledon she was beaten in the first round by fourth seed Manuela Maleeva. She retired young as a result of a wrist injury.

== WTA Tour finals ==
=== Singles (0-1) ===
Result	Date	Tournament	Tier	Surface	Opponent	Score
Loss	Sep 1984	Richmond, U.S.	$50,000 (Ginny)	Hard	(United States) JoAnne Russell	3–6, 6–4, 2–6
