= Central Fidelity Banks International =

Defunct tennis tournament
- Event name: Central Fidelity Banks International
- Tour: WTA Tour
- Founded: 1979
- Abolished: 1984
- Editions: 6
- Location: Richmond, Virginia, US
- Surface: Carpet (1979–83); Hard (1984)

The Central Fidelity Banks International (its sponsored name) is a defunct WTA Tour affiliated tennis tournament played from 1979 to 1984. Also known as the Richmond International (its official name) was held in Richmond, Virginia in the United States and played on indoor carpet courts from 1979 to 1983 and on outdoor hard courts in 1984.

The 1984 tournament is famous for the first-round match between Vicki Nelson-Dunbar and Jean Hepner which lasted six hours and 31 minutes, the longest women's match ever played. The match featured the longest rally in professional tennis history, a 643-shot rally that lasted 29 minutes.

== Past finals ==
=== Singles ===
Year	Champions	Runners-up	Score
1979	(United States) Martina Navratilova	(United States) Kathy Jordan	6–1, 6–3
1980	(United States) Martina Navratilova	(United States) Mary-Lou Piatek	6–3, 6–0
1981	(United States) Mary-Lou Piatek	(United Kingdom) Sue Barker	6–4, 6–1
1982	(Australia) Wendy Turnbull	(United States) Tracy Austin	6–7^{(3–7)}, 6–4, 6–2
1983	(South Africa) Rosalyn Fairbank	(United States) Kathy Jordan	6–4, 5–7, 6–4
1984	(United States) JoAnne Russell	(United States) Michaela Washington	6–2, 4–6, 6–2

=== Doubles ===
Year	Champions	Runners-up	Score
1979	(Australia) Wendy Turnbull (Netherlands) Betty Stöve	(United States) Billie Jean King (United States) Martina Navratilova	6–1, 6–4
1980	(United States) Billie Jean King (United States) Martina Navratilova	(United States) Pam Shriver (United States) Anne Smith	6–4, 4–6, 6–3
1981	(United Kingdom) Sue Barker (United States) Ann Kiyomura	(United States) Kathy Jordan (United States) Anne Smith	4–6, 7–6, 6–4
1982	(United States) Rosie Casals (United States) Candy Reynolds	(United States) JoAnne Russell (Romania) Virginia Ruzici	6–3, 6–3
1983	(South Africa) Rosalyn Fairbank (United States) Candy Reynolds	(United States) Kathy Jordan (United States) Barbara Potter	6–7^{(3–7)}, 6–2, 6–1
1984	(Australia) Elizabeth Minter (United States) Joanne Russell	(South Africa) Jennifer Mundel (United States) Felicia Raschiatore	6–4, 3–6, 7–6
