= JoAnne Russell =

American tennis player

- Full name: JoAnne Carleton Russell
- Country (sports): United States
- Born: October 30, 1954 (age 70) Miami, Florida
- Height: 5 ft 8 in (1.73 m)
- Plays: Right-handed
- Prize money: US$ 531,039

Singles
- Career record: 150–158
- Career titles: 2
- Highest ranking: No. 11 (1977)

Grand Slam singles results
- French Open: 2R (1982, 1984)
- Wimbledon: QF (1982)
- US Open: 4R (1980)

Doubles
- Career record: 219–175
- Career titles: 4
- Highest ranking: No. 32 (January 19, 1987)

Grand Slam doubles results
- Wimbledon: W (1977)
- US Open: QF (1975, 1981–83, 1985)

Grand Slam mixed doubles results
- French Open: 3R (1983)
- Wimbledon: QF (1978, 1982)
- US Open: F (1981)

JoAnne Russell (born October 30, 1954) is an American former professional tennis player.

== Career ==
With playing partner Helen Gourlay Cawley, she won the Wimbledon ladies' doubles title in 1977. They beat the team of Chris Evert and Rosie Casals in the first round and the top-ranked team of Martina Navratilova and Betty Stöve in the final (6–3, 6–3). Russell reached a career-high singles ranking of world No. 11.

== Grand Slam finals ==
=== Doubles: 1 (1 title) ===
Result	Year	Championship	Surface	Partner	Opponents	Score
Win	1977	Wimbledon	Grass	(Australia) Helen Gourlay Cawley	(United States) Martina Navratilova (Netherlands) Betty Stöve	6–3, 6–3

=== Mixed doubles: 1 (1 runner-up) ===
Result	Year	Championship	Surface	Partner	Opponents	Score
Loss	1981	US Open	Hard	(United States) Steve Denton	(South Africa) Kevin Curren (United States) Anne Smith	3–6, 6–7

== WTA Tour finals ==
=== Singles: 3 (2 titles, 1 runner-up) ===
Result	W/L	Date	Tournament	Surface	Opponent	Score
Win	1–0	Feb 1984	Indianapolis, U.S.	Hard (i)	(France) Pascale Paradis	7–6, 6–2
Win	2–0	Sep 1984	Richmond, U.S.	Hard	(United States) Michaela Washington	6–2, 4–6, 6–2
Loss	2–1	Oct 1984	Brighton, England	Carpet (i)	(West Germany) Sylvia Hanika	3–6, 6–1, 2–6

=== Doubles: 21 (4 titles, 17 runner-ups) ===
Result	No.	Date	Tournament	Surface	Partner	Opponents	Score
Loss	1.	Feb 1977	Detroit, U.S.	Carpet (i)	(United States) Janet Newberry	(United States) Martina Navratilova (Netherlands) Betty Stöve	3–6, 4–6
Win	2.	Jul 1977	Wimbledon, England	Grass	(Australia) Helen Gourlay	(United States) Martina Navratilova (Netherlands) Betty Stöve	6–3, 6–3
Loss	3.	Oct 1977	Phoenix, U.S.	Hard	(Australia) Helen Cawley	(United States) Billie Jean King (United States) Martina Navratilova	1–6, 5–7
Loss	4.	Feb 1978	Chicago, U.S.	Carpet (i)	(United States) Rosie Casals	(Netherlands) Betty Stöve (Australia) Evonne Cawley	1–6, 4–6
Loss	5.	Oct 1978	Brighton, England	Carpet (i)	(South Africa) Ilana Kloss	(Netherlands) Betty Stöve (United Kingdom) Virginia Wade	0–6, 6–7
Loss	6.	Mar 1980	Carlsbad, U.S.	Hard	(United States) Rosie Casals	(United States) Laura duPont (United States) Pam Shriver	7–6, 4–6, 1–6
Loss	7.	Sep 1980	Salt Lake City, U.S.	Hard	(United States) Barbara Jordan	(Romania) Virginia Ruzici (United States) Pam Teeguarden	4–6, 5–7
Loss	8.	Nov 1980	Amsterdam, Netherlands	Carpet (i)	(Socialist Federal Republic of Yugoslavia) Mima Jaušovec	(Czechoslovakia) Hana Mandlíková (Netherlands) Betty Stöve	6–7, 6–7
Loss	9.	Mar 1981	Boston, U.S.	Carpet (i)	(Romania) Virginia Ruzici	(United States) Barbara Potter (United States) Sharon Walsh	7–6, 4–6, 3–6
Loss	10.	Apr 1981	Amelia Island, U.S.	Clay	(Romania) Virginia Ruzici	(United States) Kathy Jordan (United States) Paula Smith	3–6, 7–5, 6–7
Win	11.	Aug 1981	U.S. Clay Court Championships	Clay	(Romania) Virginia Ruzici	(United Kingdom) Sue Barker (United States) Paula Smith	6–2, 6–2
Loss	12.	Apr 1982	Hilton Head, U.S.	Clay	(Romania) Virginia Ruzici	(United States) Martina Navratilova (United States) Pam Shriver	1–6, 2–6
Loss	13.	May 1982	Lugano, Switzerland	Clay	(Romania) Virginia Ruzici	(United States) Candy Reynolds (United States) Paula Smith	2–6, 4–6
Loss	14.	Aug 1982	U.S. Clay Court Championships	Clay	(Romania) Virginia Ruzici	(Argentina) Ivanna Madruga (France) Catherine Tanvier	5–7, 6–7
Loss	15.	Dec 1982	Richmond, U.S.	Carpet (i)	(Romania) Virginia Ruzici	(United States) Rosie Casals (United States) Candy Reynolds	3–6, 4–6
Loss	16.	Aug 1984	U.S. Clay Court Championships	Clay	(United States) Elise Burgin	(South Africa) Beverly Mould (United States) Paula Smith	2–6, 5–7
Win	17.	Sep 1984	Richmond, U.S.	Hard	(Australia) Elizabeth Minter	(South Africa) Jennifer Mundel (United States) Felicia Raschiatore	6–4, 3–6, 7–6
Win	18.	Mar 1985	Palm Beach, U.S.	Clay	(United States) Anne Smith	(Peru) Laura Gildemeister (Argentina) Gabriela Sabatini	1–6, 6–1, 7–6
Loss	19.	Sep 1985	Chicago, U.S.	Carpet (i)	(United States) Elise Burgin	(United States) Kathy Jordan (Australia) Liz Smylie	2–6, 2–6
Loss	20.	Jan 1986	Wichita, U.S.	Carpet (i)	(United States) Anne Smith	(United States) Kathy Jordan (United States) Candy Reynolds	3–6, 7–6, 3–6
Loss	21.	May 1986	Houston, U.S.	Clay	(United States) Elise Burgin	(United States) Chris Evert-Lloyd (Australia) Wendy Turnbull	2–6, 4–6
