= Virginie Buisson =

French tennis player (born 1969)

- Country (sports): France
- Born: 20 August 1969 (age 57)
- Prize money: US$ 52,146

Singles
- Career record: -
- Highest ranking: No. 154 (18 December 1995)

Grand Slam singles results
- French Open: 2R (1995)

Doubles
- Career record: -
Medal record
Mediterranean Games
| Bronze medal – third place | 1987 Latakia | Women's Doubles |

Virginie Buisson (born 20 August 1969) was a French tennis player. In 1995 she played in the longest ever women's singles match at the French Open, defeating Noëlle van Lottum in a 4h 7m match.

== See also ==
- Longest tennis match records
