= 1982 Davis Cup Americas Zone =

International tennis competition

The Americas Zone was one of the three regional zones of the 1982 Davis Cup.

10 teams entered the Americas Zone in total, split across the North & Central America and the South America Zones. The winner of each sub-zone advanced to the Americas Inter-Zonal Final, with the winner promoted to the following year's World Group.

Paraguay defeated Canada in the Americas Inter-Zonal Final and qualified for the 1983 World Group.

== Participating nations ==
North & Central America Zone:

- Canada
- Caribbean/West Indies
- Colombia
- Venezuela

South America Zone:

- Bolivia
- Brazil
- Ecuador
- Paraguay
- Peru
- Uruguay

== North & Central America Zone ==
=== Draw ===
Semifinals; 15–24 January
Bogotá, Colombia (clay)
Colombia	5
Caribbean/West Indies	0
Caracas, Venezuela (hard)
Canada	4
Venezuela	1

Final; 5–7 March
Montreal, Canada (indoor hard)
Colombia	1
Canada	3

=== Semifinals ===
==== Colombia vs. Caribbean/West Indies ====
Colombia
5
Club Los Lagartos, Bogotá, Colombia
22–24 January 1982
Clay

Caribbean/West Indies
0

			1	2	3	4	5
1	(Colombia) (Cricket West Indies)	Alejandro Cortes; Leo Rolle	6; 4	6; 4	6; 3
2	(Colombia) (Cricket West Indies)	Jairo Velasco; John Antonas	9; 7	6; 0	6; 4
3	(Colombia) (Cricket West Indies)	Alejandro Cortes / Jairo Velasco; John Antonas / Leo Rolle	6; 3	6; 1	3; 6	6; 4
4	(Colombia) (Cricket West Indies)	Alejandro Cortes; Adrian Clarke	6; 1	6; 4
5	(Colombia) (Cricket West Indies)	Luis Arturo González; Leo Rolle	7; 5	4; 6	6; 2	6; 4

==== Venezuela vs. Canada ====
Venezuela
1
Caracas, Venezuela
15–17 January 1982
Hard

Canada
4

			1	2	3	4	5
1	(Venezuela) (Canada)	Jorge Andrew; Harry Fritz	14; 16	9; 11	11; 9	6; 4	9; 11
2	(Venezuela) (Canada)	Randolf Scheller; Réjean Genois	2; 6	1; 6	3; 6
3	(Venezuela) (Canada)	Jorge Andrew / Iñaki Calvo; William Cowan / John Picken	4; 6	4; 6	7; 5	6; 4	7; 5
4	(Venezuela) (Canada)	Randolf Scheller; John Picken	3; 6	3; 6	4; 6
5	(Venezuela) (Canada)	Abraham Sojo; William Cowan	5; 7	2; 6

The singles match between Andrew and Fritz set the Davis Cup record for the most games in a singles rubber (100).

=== Final ===
==== Canada vs. Colombia ====
Canada
3
Montreal, Canada
5–7 March 1982
Hard (indoors)

Colombia
1

			1	2	3	4	5
1	(Canada) (Colombia)	Réjean Genois; Jairo Velasco	6; 2	8; 6	6; 3
2	(Canada) (Colombia)	Glenn Michibata; Alejandro Cortes	3; 6	4; 6	9; 11
3	(Canada) (Colombia)	Josef Brabenec / Harry Fritz; Alejandro Cortes / Jairo Velasco	6; 3	6; 3	6; 3
4	(Canada) (Colombia)	Réjean Genois; Alejandro Cortes	9; 7	4; 6	3; 6	6; 3	6; 3
5	(Canada) (Colombia)	Glenn Michibata; Jairo Velasco						not played

== South America Zone ==
=== Draw ===
Quarterfinals; 8–10 January
Brazil
bye
La Paz, Bolivia (clay)
Ecuador	5
Bolivia	0
Asunción, Paraguay (clay)
Paraguay	3
Peru	2
bye
Uruguay

Semifinals; 22–24 January
Fortaleza, Brazil (clay)
Brazil	0
Ecuador	5
Montevideo, Uruguay (clay)
Paraguay	3
Uruguay	2

Final; 5–7 March
Asunción, Paraguay (indoor carpet)
Ecuador	2
Paraguay	3

=== Quarterfinals ===
==== Bolivia vs. Ecuador ====
Bolivia
0
La Paz, Bolivia
8–10 January 1982
Clay

Ecuador
5

			1	2	3	4	5
1	(Bolivia) (Ecuador)	Juan Carlos Alvarado; Ricardo Ycaza	2; 6	1; 6	6; 3	4; 6
2	(Bolivia) (Ecuador)	Ramiro Benavides; Andrés Gómez	10; 8	3; 6	4; 6	6; 3	1; 6
3	(Bolivia) (Ecuador)	Juan Carlos Alvarado / Ramiro Benavides; Andrés Gómez / Ricardo Ycaza	6; 4	4; 6	2; 6	1; 6
4	(Bolivia) (Ecuador)	Alexander Zalesky; Andrés Gómez	1; 6	3; 6
5	(Bolivia) (Ecuador)	Ramiro Benavides; Raúl Viver	3; 6	2; 6

==== Paraguay vs. Peru ====
Paraguay
3
Asunción, Paraguay
8–10 January 1982
Clay

Peru
2

			1	2	3	4	5
1	(Paraguay) (Peru)	Francisco González; Pablo Arraya	6; 2	8; 6	6; 4
2	(Paraguay) (Peru)	Víctor Pecci; Fernando Maynetto	6; 4	7; 5	6; 2
3	(Paraguay) (Peru)	Francisco González / Víctor Pecci; Pablo Arraya / Fernando Maynetto	4; 6	7; 5	6; 4	6; 3
4	(Paraguay) (Peru)	Oscar Napout; Carlos di Laura	2; 6	2; 6
5	(Paraguay) (Peru)	Francisco Arréllaga; Luciano Cuneo	6; 4	4; 6	0; 6

=== Semifinals ===
==== Brazil vs. Ecuador ====
Brazil
0
Fortaleza, Brazil
22–24 January 1982
Clay

Ecuador
5

			1	2	3	4	5
1	(Brazil) (Ecuador)	Edvaldo Oliveira; Ricardo Ycaza	1; 6	1; 6	2; 6
2	(Brazil) (Ecuador)	Marcos Braga; Andrés Gómez	2; 6	6; 4	3; 6	4; 6
3	(Brazil) (Ecuador)	Eduardo Oncins / Fernando Roese; Andrés Gómez / Ricardo Ycaza	4; 6	4; 6	4; 6
4	(Brazil) (Ecuador)	Fernando Roese; Raúl Viver	7; 9	2; 6	2; 6
5	(Brazil) (Ecuador)	Eduardo Oncins; Ricardo Ycaza	5; 7	3; 6

==== Uruguay vs. Paraguay ====
Uruguay
2
Montevideo, Uruguay
22–24 January 1982
Clay

Paraguay
3

			1	2	3	4	5
1	(Uruguay) (Paraguay)	Diego Pérez; Francisco González	1; 6	6; 4	1; 6	8; 6	6; 3
2	(Uruguay) (Paraguay)	José Luis Damiani; Víctor Pecci	8; 6	6; 3	8; 6
3	(Uruguay) (Paraguay)	José Luis Damiani / Diego Pérez; Francisco González / Víctor Pecci	3; 6	6; 3	7; 9	9; 7	6; 8
4	(Uruguay) (Paraguay)	José Luis Damiani; Francisco González	4; 6	4; 6	3; 6
5	(Uruguay) (Paraguay)	Diego Pérez; Víctor Pecci	1; 6	7; 5	6; 8	4; 6

=== Final ===
==== Paraguay vs. Ecuador ====
Paraguay
3
Asunción, Paraguay
5–7 March 1982
Carpet (indoors)

Ecuador
2

			1	2	3	4	5
1	(Paraguay) (Ecuador)	Víctor Pecci; Ricardo Ycaza	6; 1	10; 8	6; 1
2	(Paraguay) (Ecuador)	Francisco González; Andrés Gómez	6; 3	14; 12	6; 3
3	(Paraguay) (Ecuador)	Francisco González / Víctor Pecci; Andrés Gómez / Ricardo Ycaza	8; 6	3; 6	2; 6	4; 6
4	(Paraguay) (Ecuador)	Víctor Pecci; Andrés Gómez	7; 5	5; 7	6; 2	6; 4
5	(Paraguay) (Ecuador)	Francisco González; Ricardo Ycaza	6; 1	5; 7	3; 6

== Americas Inter-Zonal Final ==
=== Canada vs. Paraguay ===
Canada
1
Laval, Canada
7–9 May 1982
Hard (indoors)

Paraguay
4

			1	2	3	4	5
1	(Canada) (Paraguay)	Glenn Michibata; Francisco González	3; 6	6; 3	4; 6	6; 4	3; 6
2	(Canada) (Paraguay)	Réjean Genois; Víctor Pecci	2; 6	6; 8	3; 6
3	(Canada) (Paraguay)	William Cowan / Harry Fritz; Francisco González / Víctor Pecci	4; 6	4; 6	0; 6
4	(Canada) (Paraguay)	Réjean Genois; Francisco González	3; 6	5; 7
5	(Canada) (Paraguay)	Glenn Michibata; Francisco Arréllaga	6; 1	6; 0
