= Jean Hepner =

American tennis player

- Country (sports): United States
- Born: October 25, 1958 (age 66)
- Prize money: US$ 17,145

Singles
- Career record: -

Grand Slam singles results
- French Open: 2R (1983)
- Wimbledon: 1R (1983)
- US Open: 2R (1978, 1983)

Doubles
- Career record: -

Jean Hepner (born October 25, 1958) is a former professional tennis player from the United States.

Hepner is notable for holding the record for participating in the longest women's tennis match in a match against Vicki Nelson-Dunbar at a tournament in Richmond, Virginia, in 1984, which lasted six hours and 31 minutes. Additionally, this match contains two other records. It featured a 29-minute, 643-shot rally, the longest in professional tennis history. This was also the longest professional match completed in a single day. Hepner reached the second round of the 1978 US Open, the 1983 French Open, and the 1983 US Open.

== See also ==
- Longest tennis match records
