= 2010 Trophée des Alpilles – Singles =

Singles
- 2010 Trophée des Alpilles

Final
- Champion: (Poland) Jerzy Janowicz
- Runner-up: (France) Édouard Roger-Vasselin
- Score: 3–6, 7–6^{(10–8)}, 7–6^{(8–6)}

Events
| Singles | Doubles |
| ← 2009 · | Trophée des Alpilles | · 2011 → |

Marcos Baghdatis was the defending champion but decided not to participate this year.
Jerzy Janowicz won this event after beating Édouard Roger-Vasselin in the final 3–6, 7–6^{(10–8)}, 7–6^{(8–6)}.

== Seeds ==
1. (Germany) Rainer Schüttler (quarterfinals)
2. (Russia) Igor Kunitsyn (semifinals)
3. (France) Édouard Roger-Vasselin (final)
4. (France) David Guez (first round)
5. (Switzerland) Stéphane Bohli (quarterfinals)
6. (France) Josselin Ouanna (quarterfinals)
7. (France) Adrian Mannarino (first round)
8. (Republic of Ireland) Conor Niland (semifinals)

== Draw ==
=== Key ===
- Q = Qualifier
- WC = Wild card
- LL = Lucky loser
- Alt = Alternate
- SE = Special exempt
- PR = Protected ranking
- ITF = ITF entry
- JE = Junior exempt
- w/o = Walkover
- r = Retired
- d = Defaulted
- SR = Special ranking

=== Finals ===
Semifinals
8 | (Republic of Ireland) Conor Niland | 6 | 1 | 4
(Poland) Jerzy Janowicz | 4 | 6 | 6
3 | (France) Édouard Roger-Vasselin | 6 | 6
2 | (Russia) Igor Kunitsyn | 4 | 3

Final
(Poland) Jerzy Janowicz | 3 | 7 | 7
3 | (France) Édouard Roger-Vasselin | 6 | 6^{8} | 6^{6}

=== Top half ===
First round
1 | (Germany) R Schüttler | 6 | 6
(Belgium) Y Mertens | 0 | 2
LL | (France) D Descloix | 3 | 6^{4}
Q | (France) A Renard | 6 | 7
(Belarus) U Ignatik | 3 | 6 | 6
WC | (France) J Inzerillo | 6 | 1 | 0
Q | (Switzerland) G Bastl | 6 | 4 | 4
8 | (Republic of Ireland) C Niland | 4 | 6 | 6
4 | (France) D Guez | 0 | 4
(Poland) J Janowicz | 6 | 6
(France) V Millot | 6 | 6
(Canada) P-L Duclos | 4 | 4
(Finland) H Heliövaara | 6^{1} | 6 | 6
(Sweden) M Ryderstedt | 7 | 2 | 3
(Luxembourg) G Müller | 4 | 7 | 6
7 | (France) A Mannarino | 6 | 6 | 1

Second round
1 | (Germany) R Schüttler | 7 | 6
Q | (France) A Renard | 6 | 2
(Belarus) U Ignatik | 5 | 4
8 | (Republic of Ireland) C Niland | 7 | 6
(Poland) J Janowicz | 7 | 7
(France) V Millot | 6^{5} | 6^{2}
(Finland) H Heliövaara | 2 | 7 | 2
(Luxembourg) G Müller | 6 | 6^{3} | 6

Quarterfinals
1 | (Germany) R Schüttler | 6 | 1 | 6^{6}
8 | (Republic of Ireland) C Niland | 2 | 6 | 7
(Poland) J Janowicz | 6 | 7
(Luxembourg) G Müller | 4 | 6^{4}

Semifinals
8 | (Republic of Ireland) C Niland | 6 | 1 | 4
(Poland) J Janowicz | 4 | 6 | 6

=== Bottom half ===
First round
6 | (France) J Ouanna | 7 | 2 | 6
(Latvia) A Juška | 6^{9} | 6 | 4
(France) C-A Brezac | 3 | 6 | 6
Q | (Lithuania) L Grigelis | 6 | 3 | 2
WC | (France) P-H Herbert | 6 | 4 | 3
LL | (Latvia) D Pavlovs | 3 | 6 | 6
(Switzerland) M Lammer | 3 | 1
3 | (France) É Roger-Vasselin | 6 | 6
5 | (Switzerland) S Bohli | 7 | 6
(Spain) R Bautista-Agut | 5 | 3
(Italy) A Stoppini | 7 | 6
(France) M Gicquel | 5 | 4
(United Kingdom) R Bloomfield | 6^{7} | 1 | r
WC | (France) J Hilaire | 7 | 4
Q | (France) O Charroin | 4 | 1
2 | (Russia) I Kunitsyn | 6 | 6

Second round
6 | (France) J Ouanna | 6 | 6
(France) C-A Brezac | 1 | 2
LL | (Latvia) D Pavlovs | 2 | 4
3 | (France) É Roger-Vasselin | 6 | 6
5 | (Switzerland) S Bohli | 5
(Italy) A Stoppini | 5 | r
WC | (France) J Hilaire | 1 | 3
2 | (Russia) I Kunitsyn | 6 | 6

Quarterfinals
6 | (France) J Ouanna | 6 | 5 | 3
3 | (France) É Roger-Vasselin | 4 | 7 | 6
5 | (Switzerland) S Bohli | 6^{3} | 4
2 | (Russia) I Kunitsyn | 7 | 6

Semifinals
3 | (France) É Roger-Vasselin | 6 | 6
2 | (Russia) I Kunitsyn | 4 | 3
