= 2010 Trophée des Alpilles – Doubles =

Doubles
- 2010 Trophée des Alpilles

Final
- Champions: (Luxembourg) Gilles Müller (France) Édouard Roger-Vasselin
- Runners-up: (Latvia) Andis Juška (Latvia) Deniss Pavlovs
- Score: 6–0, 2–6, [13–11]

Events
Singles	Doubles
← 2009 ·	Trophée des Alpilles	· 2011 →

Jiří Krkoška and Lukáš Lacko are the defending champions but decided not to participate this year.
Gilles Müller and Édouard Roger-Vasselin won the final against Andis Juška and Deniss Pavlovs 6–0, 2–6, [13–11].

== Seeds ==
1. (United Kingdom) Jamie Delgado / (United Kingdom) Jonathan Marray (semifinals)
2. (Australia) Jordan Kerr / (United States) Travis Parrott (first round)
3. (Canada) Pierre-Ludovic Duclos / (Belarus) Uladzimir Ignatik (semifinals)
4. (Latvia) Andis Juška / (Latvia) Deniss Pavlovs (final)

== Draw ==
=== Key ===
- Q = Qualifier
- WC = Wild card
- LL = Lucky loser
- Alt = Alternate
- SE = Special exempt
- PR = Protected ranking
- ITF = ITF entry
- JE = Junior exempt
- w/o = Walkover
- r = Retired
- d = Defaulted
- SR = Special ranking

=== Draw ===
First round
1	(United Kingdom) J Delgado (United Kingdom) J Marray	7	6^{4}	[10]
(Switzerland) G Bastl (France) P-H Herbert	6^{5}	7	[2]
WC	(India) D Sharan (India) A Singh	1	3
(Finland) H Heliövaara (Sweden) M Ryderstedt	6	6
4	(Latvia) A Juška (Latvia) D Pavlovs	7	6
(France) C-A Brezac (France) V Stouff	5	4
(France) M Gicquel (France) A Mannarino	6	6
WC	(France) Y Jankovits (France) R Mathieu	3	2
(France) D Guez (France) J Inzerillo	6	6
(Lithuania) L Grigelis (Italy) A Stoppini	1	4
WC	(France) D Descloix (France) J-P Vernet	2	1
3	(Canada) P-L Duclos (Belarus) U Ignatik	6	6
ALT	(France) S Lami (France) F Maury	3	1
(Luxembourg) G Müller (France) É Roger-Vasselin	6	6
(France) O Charroin (France) A Renard	6	6
2	(Australia) J Kerr (United States) T Parrott	3	4

Quarterfinals
1	(United Kingdom) J Delgado (United Kingdom) J Marray	6	7
(Finland) H Heliövaara (Sweden) M Ryderstedt	2	6^{3}
4	(Latvia) A Juška (Latvia) D Pavlovs	7	4	[10]
(France) M Gicquel (France) A Mannarino	5	6	[7]
(France) D Guez (France) J Inzerillo	6	4	[8]
3	(Canada) P-L Duclos (Belarus) U Ignatik	3	6	[10]
(Luxembourg) G Müller (France) É Roger-Vasselin	6	6
(France) O Charroin (France) A Renard	4	1

Semifinals
1	(United Kingdom) J Delgado (United Kingdom) J Marray	3	6^{5}
4	(Latvia) A Juška (Latvia) D Pavlovs	6	7
3	(Canada) P-L Duclos (Belarus) U Ignatik	4	6^{1}
(Luxembourg) G Müller (France) É Roger-Vasselin	6	7

Finals
4	(Latvia) A Juška (Latvia) D Pavlovs	0	6	[11]
(Luxembourg) G Müller (France) É Roger-Vasselin	6	2	[13]
