= 2012 Trophée des Alpilles – Doubles =

Doubles
- 2012 Trophée des Alpilles

Final
- Champions: (Lithuania) Laurynas Grigelis (Belarus) Uladzimir Ignatik
- Runners-up: (Spain) Jordi Marsé-Vidri (Spain) Carles Poch-Gradin
- Score: 6–7^{(4–7)}, 6–3, [10–6]

Events
Singles	Doubles
← 2011 ·	Trophée des Alpilles	· 2013 →

Pierre-Hugues Herbert and Édouard Roger-Vasselin were the defending champions but Roger-Vasselin decided not to participate.
Herbert played alongside Laurent Rochette.
Laurynas Grigelis and Uladzimir Ignatik won the title 6–7^{(4–7)}, 6–3, [10–6] against Jordi Marsé-Vidri and Carles Poch-Gradin in the final.

== Seeds ==
1. (Lithuania) Laurynas Grigelis / (Belarus) Uladzimir Ignatik (champions)
2. (France) Pierre-Hugues Herbert / (France) Laurent Rochette (quarterfinals, withdrew)
3. (Belarus) Alexander Bury / (Belarus) Andrei Vasilevski (quarterfinals)
4. (United Kingdom) David Rice / (United Kingdom) Sean Thornley (first round)

== Draw ==
=== Key ===
- Q = Qualifier
- WC = Wild card
- LL = Lucky loser
- Alt = Alternate
- SE = Special exempt
- PR = Protected ranking
- ITF = ITF entry
- JE = Junior exempt
- w/o = Walkover
- r = Retired
- d = Defaulted
- SR = Special ranking

=== Draw ===
First round
1	(Lithuania) L Grigelis (Belarus) U Ignatik	6	6
WC	(Switzerland) G Bastl (France) Antoine Benneteau	3	3
(France) M Gicquel (France) A Mannarino	6	6^{8}	[10]
(France) V Millot (France) J Ouanna	4	7^{10}	[8]
4	(United Kingdom) D Rice (United Kingdom) S Thornley	5	3
(United Kingdom) J Baker (Canada) É Chvojka	7	6
(Moldova) R Albot (Russia) D Matsukevitch	6	3	[10]
WC	(France) A Escoffier (France) Martin Vaisse	1	6	[7]
(Spain) A Menéndez (France) M Teixeira	6^{1}	4
(Germany) M Bachinger (Germany) F Moser	7^{7}	6
(Latvia) A Juška (Russia) K Kravchuk	7	2	[7]
3	(Belarus) A Bury (Belarus) A Vasilevski	5	6	[10]
(Canada) P-L Duclos (Portugal) G Elias	5	5
(Spain) Jordi Marsé-Vidri (Spain) C Poch-Gradin	7	7
WC	(France) Hugo Nys (France) Elie Rousset	1	5
2	(France) P-H Herbert (France) Laurent Rochette	6	7

Quarterfinals
1	(Lithuania) L Grigelis (Belarus) U Ignatik	6	7
(France) M Gicquel (France) A Mannarino	2	5
(United Kingdom) J Baker (Canada) É Chvojka	6	6
(Moldova) R Albot (Russia) D Matsukevitch	1	2
(Germany) M Bachinger (Germany) F Moser	6	6
3	(Belarus) A Bury (Belarus) A Vasilevski	2	3
(Spain) Jordi Marsé-Vidri (Spain) C Poch-Gradin	w/o
2	(France) P-H Herbert (France) Laurent Rochette

Semifinals
1	(Lithuania) L Grigelis (Belarus) U Ignatik	6	3	[10]
(United Kingdom) J Baker (Canada) É Chvojka	4	6	[8]
(Germany) M Bachinger (Germany) F Moser	3	3
(Spain) Jordi Marsé-Vidri (Spain) C Poch-Gradin	6	6

Final
1	(Lithuania) L Grigelis (Belarus) U Ignatik	6^{4}	6	[10]
(Spain) Jordi Marsé-Vidri (Spain) C Poch-Gradin	7^{7}	3	[6]
