= 2013 Trophée des Alpilles – Doubles =

Doubles
- 2013 Trophée des Alpilles

Final
- Champions: (France) Pierre-Hugues Herbert (France) Albano Olivetti
- Runners-up: (France) Marc Gicquel (France) Josselin Ouanna
- Score: 6–3, 6–7^{(5–7)}, [15–13]

Events
Singles	Doubles
← 2012 ·	Trophée des Alpilles	· 2014 →

Pierre-Hugues Herbert and Albano Olivetti won the title, beating Marc Gicquel and Josselin Ouanna 6–3, 6–7^{(5–7)}, [15–13]

== Seeds ==
1. (Brazil) Marcelo Demoliner / (Germany) Frank Moser (quarterfinals)
2. (United Kingdom) Ken Skupski / (United Kingdom) Neal Skupski (first round)
3. (Brazil) Guilherme Clezar / (India) Purav Raja (first round)
4. (United Kingdom) David Rice / (United Kingdom) Sean Thornley (first round)

== Draw ==
=== Key ===
- Q = Qualifier
- WC = Wild card
- LL = Lucky loser
- Alt = Alternate
- SE = Special exempt
- PR = Protected ranking
- ITF = ITF entry
- JE = Junior exempt
- w/o = Walkover
- r = Retired
- d = Defaulted
- SR = Special ranking

=== Draw ===
First round
1	(Brazil) M Demoliner (Germany) F Moser	5	6	[11]
(Moldova) R Albot (Belarus) U Ignatik	7	2	[9]
(France) P-H Herbert (France) A Olivetti	6	7^{7}
(Italy) F Cipolla (Uzbekistan) F Dustov	2	6^{3}
4	(United Kingdom) D Rice (United Kingdom) S Thornley	7	4	[8]
(Austria) M Fischer (Spain) A Menéndez-Maceiras	5	6	[10]
(Switzerland) S Bohli (Switzerland) A Bossel	4	4
(Russia) K Kravchuk (Ukraine) D Molchanov	6	6
WC	(France) Damien Bayard (France) M Vaïsse	6	6
WC	(France) Florent Maury (France) Jerome Santino	2	2
(France) M Gicquel (France) J Ouanna	5	6	[10]
3	(Brazil) G Clezar (India) P Raja	7	4	[4]
(Switzerland) M Chiudinelli (Poland) M Przysiężny	6	7^{7}
WC	(France) D Descloix (France) Y Jankovits	3	6^{5}
(Uruguay) A Behar (Spain) C Poch-Gradin	6	6
2	(United Kingdom) K Skupski (United Kingdom) N Skupski	4	3

Quarterfinals
1	(Brazil) M Demoliner (Germany) F Moser	3	3
(France) P-H Herbert (France) A Olivetti	6	6
(Austria) M Fischer (Spain) A Menéndez-Maceiras	3	6	[2]
(Russia) K Kravchuk (Ukraine) D Molchanov	6	3	[10]
WC	(France) D Bayard (France) M Vaïsse	3	1
(France) M Gicquel (France) J Ouanna	6	6
(Switzerland) M Chiudinelli (Poland) M Przysiężny
(Uruguay) A Behar (Spain) C Poch-Gradin	w/o

Semifinals
(France) P-H Herbert (France) A Olivetti	7	6
(Russia) K Kravchuk (Ukraine) D Molchanov	5	2
(France) M Gicquel (France) J Ouanna	6	6
(Uruguay) A Behar (Spain) C Poch-Gradin	4	3

Final
(France) P-H Herbert (France) A Olivetti	6	6^{5}	[15]
(France) M Gicquel (France) J Ouanna	3	7^{7}	[13]
