= 2013 Trophée des Alpilles – Singles =

Singles
- 2013 Trophée des Alpilles

Final
- Champion: (France) Marc Gicquel
- Runner-up: (Italy) Matteo Viola
- Score: 6–4, 6–3

Events
Singles	Doubles
- Trophée des Alpilles

Josselin Ouanna was the defending champion, but lost to Matteo Viola in the Quarterfinals.
Marc Gicquel defeated Matteo Viola 6–4, 6–3 in the final.

== Seeds ==
1. (France) Kenny de Schepper (first round)
2. (Slovakia) Lukáš Lacko (first round)
3. (France) Paul-Henri Mathieu (semifinals)
4. (Poland) Michał Przysiężny (second round, withdrew due to right shoulder injury)
5. (France) Marc Gicquel (champion)
6. (Italy) Matteo Viola (final)
7. (Kazakhstan) Andrey Golubev (quarterfinals)
8. (Italy) Flavio Cipolla (quarterfinals)

== Draw ==
Key

- Q = Qualifier
- WC = Wild card
- LL = Lucky loser
- Alt = Alternate
- ITF = ITF entry
- PR = Protected ranking
- SR = Special ranking
- SE = Special exempt
- JE = Junior exempt
- JR = Junior Accelerator Programme entrant
- CO = College Accelerator Programme entrant
- NG = Next Gen Accelerator Program entrant
- w/o = Walkover
- r = Retired
- d = Defaulted

=== Finals ===
Semifinals
(Austria) Martin Fischer	6^{5}	4
5	(France) Marc Gicquel	7^{7}	6
3	(France) Paul-Henri Mathieu	7	4	4
6	(Italy) Matteo Viola	5	6	6

Final
5	(France) Marc Gicquel	6	6
6	(Italy) Matteo Viola	4	3

=== Top half ===
First round
1	(France) K de Schepper	6	3	6^{8}
(Switzerland) S Bohli	4	6	7^{10}
(Germany) Stefan Seifert	5	1
(Austria) M Fischer	7	6
WC	(France) M Vaïsse	6	6
Q	(Russia) D Matsukevich	3	4
LL	(Brazil) M Demoliner	6^{5}	2
7	(Kazakhstan) A Golubev	7^{7}	6
4	(Poland) M Przysiężny	6	6^{3}	6
(Uzbekistan) F Dustov	3	7^{7}	4
Q	(United Kingdom) D Rice	6	1	6^{4}
(France) P-H Herbert	2	6	7^{7}
WC	(France) E Couacaud	2	6	6
Q	(France) Y Jankovits	6	4	4
(Hungary) M Fucsovics	3	0
5	(France) M Gicquel	6	6

Second round
(Switzerland) S Bohli	2	2
(Austria) M Fischer	6	6
WC	(France) M Vaïsse	4	5
7	(Kazakhstan) A Golubev	6	7
4	(Poland) M Przysiężny
(France) P-H Herbert	w/o
WC	(France) E Couacaud	1	4
5	(France) M Gicquel	6	6

Quarterfinals
(Austria) M Fischer	6	6
7	(Kazakhstan) A Golubev	2	4
(France) P-H Herbert	6	4	6^{3}
5	(France) M Gicquel	3	6	7

Semifinals
(Austria) M Fischer	6^{5}	4
5	(France) M Gicquel	7^{7}	6

=== Bottom half ===
First round
8	(Italy) F Cipolla	6	3	6
(Ukraine) D Molchanov	3	6	0
Q	(India) P Raja	3	6^{3}
(Czech Republic) Michal Konečný	6	7^{7}
(Belarus) U Ignatik	7^{7}	6
(France) A Olivetti	6^{3}	3
(Spain) A Menéndez-Maceiras	6	4	2
3	(France) P-H Mathieu	3	6	6
6	(Italy) M Viola	4	1
WC	(France) M Chazal	6	1^{r}
(Brazil) G Clezar	1	3
WC	(Russia) K Kravchuk	6	6
(Moldova) R Albot	4	2
(France) J Ouanna	6	6
(Switzerland) M Chiudinelli	4	6	6
2	(Slovakia) L Lacko	6	3	3

Second round
8	(Italy) F Cipolla	6	6
(Czech Republic) M Konečný	4	0
(Belarus) U Ignatik	1	4
3	(France) P-H Mathieu	6	6
6	(Italy) M Viola	6	6
WC	(Russia) K Kravchuk	2	3
(France) J Ouanna	7	4	6
(Switzerland) M Chiudinelli	5	6	2

Quarterfinals
8	(Italy) F Cipolla	3	2
3	(France) P-H Mathieu	6	6
6	(Italy) M Viola	7	6
(France) J Ouanna	5	1

Semifinals
3	(France) P-H Mathieu	7	4	4
6	(Italy) M Viola	5	6	6
