= 2014 Trophée des Alpilles – Singles =

Singles
- 2014 Trophée des Alpilles

Final
- Champion: (France) Nicolas Mahut
- Runner-up: (France) Vincent Millot
- Score: 6–7^{(3–7)}, 6–4, 6–3

Events
Singles	Doubles
- Trophée des Alpilles

Tennis singles was an event at the 2014 Trophée des Alpilles, the sixth iteration of the annual Trophée des Alpilles tennis tournament.

Nicolas Mahut won the all French final, beating Vincent Millot 6–7^{(3–7)}, 6–4, 6

== Seeds ==
1. (France) Paul-Henri Mathieu (first round)
2. (Ukraine) Sergiy Stakhovsky (semifinals)
3. (France) Nicolas Mahut (champion)
4. (France) Kenny de Schepper (second round)
5. (Russia) Evgeny Donskoy (first round)
6. (Slovakia) Norbert Gomboš (quarterfinals)
7. (France) Pierre-Hugues Herbert (semifinals)
8. (Japan) Hiroki Moriya (first round)

== Draw ==
Key

- Q = Qualifier
- WC = Wild card
- LL = Lucky loser
- Alt = Alternate
- ITF = ITF entry
- PR = Protected ranking
- SR = Special ranking
- SE = Special exempt
- JE = Junior exempt
- JR = Junior Accelerator Programme entrant
- CO = College Accelerator Programme entrant
- NG = Next Gen Accelerator Program entrant
- w/o = Walkover
- r = Retired
- d = Defaulted

=== Finals ===
Semifinals
7	(France) Pierre-Hugues Herbert	4	4
3/WC	(France) Nicolas Mahut	6	6
(France) Vincent Millot	6	6
2	(Ukraine) Sergiy Stakhovsky	4	2

Final
3/WC	(France) Nicolas Mahut	6^{3}	6	6
(France) Vincent Millot	7^{7}	4	3

=== Top half ===
First round
1	(France) P-H Mathieu	4	2
(Germany) A Zverev	6	6
Q	(Belarus) S Betov	0^{r}
(France) D Guez	5
Q	(Israel) Bar Tzuf Botzer	3	2
(Switzerland) Y Marti	6	6
Q	(Croatia) F Veger	6^{2}	6^{4}
7	(France) P-H Herbert	7^{7}	7^{7}
3/WC	(France) N Mahut	6	6
Alt	(Germany) R Becker	4	4
WC	(France) M Vaïsse	6	7^{7}
(Austria) M Fischer	1	6^{4}
(France) F Martin	6	6
Alt	(France) F Serra	3	2
(France) J Ouanna	6^{4}	7	4
6	(Slovakia) N Gomboš	7^{7}	5	6

Second round
(Germany) A Zverev	6	6
(France) D Guez	4	3
(Switzerland) Y Marti	1	0^{r}
7	(France) P-H Herbert	6	3
3/WC	(France) N Mahut	6	7
WC	(France) M Vaïsse	2	5
(France) F Martin	1	4
6	(Slovakia) N Gomboš	6	6

Quarterfinals
(Germany) A Zverev	5	6	2
7	(France) P-H Herbert	7	4	6
3/WC	(France) N Mahut	6	1	6
6	(Slovakia) N Gomboš	4	6	1

Semifinals
7	(France) P-H Herbert	4	4
3/WC	(France) N Mahut	6	6

=== Bottom half ===
First round
8	(Japan) H Moriya	6	1	3
(France) V Millot	3	6	6
(Russia) K Kravchuk	5	6	6^{4}
(Belgium) R Bemelmans	7	2	7^{7}
(Ukraine) D Molchanov	6	1	6
(Slovakia) I Klec	4	6	3
(France) G Burquier	7^{7}	3	3
4	(France) K de Schepper	6^{3}	6	6
5	(Russia) E Donskoy	6	3	4
(Belarus) E Gerasimov	2	6	6
WC	(Ukraine) Vitalii Shcherba	2	0
WC	(France) M Chazal	6	6
LL	(Switzerland) M Lammer	4	2
(France) M Gicquel	6	6
Q	(Italy) Erik Crepaldi	6	2	1
2	(Ukraine) S Stakhovsky	3	6	6

Second round
(France) V Millot	6	6
(Belgium) R Bemelmans	2	3
(Ukraine) D Molchanov	6	6
4	(France) K de Schepper	4	4
(Belarus) E Gerasimov	6^{3}	6	0
WC	(France) M Chazal	7^{7}	4	6
(France) M Gicquel	6^{2}	4
2	(Ukraine) S Stakhovsky	7^{7}	6

Quarterfinals
(France) V Millot	6	7^{7}
(Ukraine) D Molchanov	1	6^{4}
WC	(France) M Chazal	2	6^{0}
2	(Ukraine) S Stakhovsky	6	7^{7}

Semifinals
(France) V Millot	6	6
2	(Ukraine) S Stakhovsky	4	2
