= 2015 Trophée des Alpilles – Singles =

Singles
- 2015 Trophée des Alpilles

Final
- Champion: (Croatia) Ivan Dodig
- Runner-up: (Germany) Nils Langer
- Score: 6–3, 6–2

Events
Singles	Doubles
← 2014 ·	Trophée des Alpilles	· 2016 →

Nicolas Mahut was the defending champion, but chose not to defend his title.

== Seeds ==
1. (Slovakia) Lukáš Lacko (second round)
2. (Germany) Matthias Bachinger (semifinals)
3. (Slovakia) Norbert Gombos (quarterfinals)
4. (United Kingdom) James Ward (first round)
5. (Croatia) Ivan Dodig (champion)
6. (Poland) Michał Przysiężny (withdrew)
7. (Slovakia) Andrej Martin (first round)
8. (France) Vincent Millot (second round)

== Draw ==
=== Key ===
- Q = Qualifier
- WC = Wild card
- LL = Lucky loser
- Alt = Alternate
- SE = Special exempt
- PR = Protected ranking
- ITF = ITF entry
- JE = Junior exempt
- w/o = Walkover
- r = Retired
- d = Defaulted
- SR = Special ranking

=== Finals ===
Semifinals
5/WC	(Croatia) Ivan Dodig	6	6^{1}	6
(France) David Guez	1	7^{7}	3
(Germany) Nils Langer	6	6^{1}	6
2	(Germany) Matthias Bachinger	2	7^{7}	2

Final
5/WC	(Croatia) Ivan Dodig	6	6
(Germany) Nils Langer	3	2

=== Top half ===
First round
1	(Slovakia) L Lacko	6	6
(Italy) Erik Crepaldi	4	0
WC	(France) Sebastien Boltz	6	6
(Russia) A Karatsev	0	4
(Belgium) Y Mertens	3	6^{3}
Q	(Croatia) F Veger	6	7^{7}
(Romania) M Copil	2	6	4
5/WC	(Croatia) I Dodig	6	4	6
3	(Slovakia) N Gombos	7	6
(United Kingdom) J Milton	5	0
(Netherlands) S Griekspoor	2	7^{9}	6
(France) Y Jankovits	6	6^{7}	3
WC	(France) Jonathan Hilaire	4	7^{8}	7^{7}
WC	(France) M Vaïsse	6	6^{6}	6^{3}
(France) D Guez	6	3	6
7	(Slovakia) A Martin	4	6	1

Second round
1	(Slovakia) L Lacko	4	6	3
WC	(France) S Boltz	6	1	6
Q	(Croatia) F Veger	2	6	3
5/WC	(Croatia) I Dodig	6	3	6
3	(Slovakia) N Gombos	6	6
(Netherlands) S Griekspoor	1	4
WC	(France) J Hilaire	5	3
(France) D Guez	7	6

Quarterfinals
WC	(France) S Boltz	2	6	3
5/WC	(Croatia) I Dodig	6	4	6
3	(Slovakia) N Gombos	2	5
(France) D Guez	6	7

Semifinals
5/WC	(Croatia) I Dodig	6	6^{1}	6
(France) D Guez	1	7^{7}	3

=== Bottom half ===
First round
8	(France) V Millot	7	6^{1}	6
Q	(France) A Muller	5	7^{7}	4
(Germany) N Langer	6	6
(Switzerland) M Chiudinelli	2	3
(France) Q Halys	6	6
Q	(France) Constantin Belot	3	2
(Belarus) I Ivashka	6	6
4	(United Kingdom) J Ward	1	4
LL	(France) Nino Portales	2	4
(Germany) T Pütz	6	6
Alt	(Republic of Ireland) S Barry	6	3	6
(Italy) A Bega	2	6	3
Alt	(France) H Nys	6	6
Q	(France) H Grenier	2	3
(France) J Eysseric	3	3
2	(Germany) M Bachinger	6	6

Second round
8	(France) V Millot	0	6	4
(Germany) N Langer	6	4	6
(France) Q Halys	6	7^{7}
(Belarus) I Ivashka	4	6^{1}
(Germany) T Pütz	3
Alt	(Republic of Ireland) S Barry	0^{r}
Alt	(France) H Nys	6	3	3
2	(Germany) M Bachinger	4	6	6

Quarterfinals
(Germany) N Langer	2	6	6
(France) Q Halys	6	1	3
(Germany) T Pütz	2	6	3
2	(Germany) M Bachinger	6	4	6

Semifinals
(Germany) N Langer	6	6^{1}	6
2	(Germany) M Bachinger	2	7^{7}	2
