= 2011 Trophée des Alpilles – Singles =

Singles
- 2011 Trophée des Alpilles

Final
- Champion: (France) Édouard Roger-Vasselin
- Runner-up: (France) Arnaud Clément
- Score: 6–4, 6–3

Events
Singles	Doubles
← 2010 ·	Trophée des Alpilles	· 2012 →

Jerzy Janowicz was the defending champion but decided to play in Sevilla instead.

Édouard Roger-Vasselin won against Arnaud Clément 6–4, 6–3 in the final and swept the title.

== Seeds ==
1. (France) Nicolas Mahut (semifinals)
2. (Belgium) Steve Darcis (quarterfinals)
3. (France) Édouard Roger-Vasselin (champion)
4. (France) Kenny de Schepper (first round)
5. (Ukraine) Illya Marchenko (second round)
6. (France) Arnaud Clément (final)
7. (Spain) Arnau Brugués-Davi (quarterfinals)
8. (Slovakia) Lukáš Lacko (semifinals)

== Draw ==
=== Key ===
- Q = Qualifier
- WC = Wild card
- LL = Lucky loser
- Alt = Alternate
- SE = Special exempt
- PR = Protected ranking
- ITF = ITF entry
- JE = Junior exempt
- w/o = Walkover
- r = Retired
- d = Defaulted
- SR = Special ranking

=== Finals ===
Semifinals
1	(France) Nicolas Mahut	4	6	2
3	(France) Édouard Roger-Vasselin	6	3	6
8	(Slovakia) Lukáš Lacko	7^{7}	3	3
6	(France) Arnaud Clément	6^{3}	6	6

Final
3	(France) Édouard Roger-Vasselin	6	6
6	(France) Arnaud Clément	4	3

=== Top half ===
First round
1	(France) N Mahut	7^{7}	6
(Australia) C Ball	6^{3}	3
(Finland) H Kontinen	7^{7}
(Germany) A Begemann	6^{5}	4
WC	(France) Jonathan Hilaire	7^{7}	4	1
(Belarus) U Ignatik	6^{2}	6	6
WC	(France) N Renavand	3	4
7	(Spain) A Brugués-Davi	6	6
3	(France) É Roger-Vasselin	6	3	6
Alt	(France) J Ouanna	4	6	0
Q	(United Kingdom) D Rice	6^{2}	2
(Russia) D Matsukevich	7^{7}	6
Q	(Germany) Sami Reinwein	7^{7}	3	4
(Lithuania) L Grigelis	6^{1}	6	6
(France) G Burquier	2	4
5	(Ukraine) I Marchenko	6	6

Second round
1	(France) N Mahut	3	6	7^{7}
(Finland) H Kontinen	6	3	6^{5}
(Belarus) U Ignatik	3	3
7	(Spain) A Brugués-Davi	6	6
3	(France) É Roger-Vasselin	6	6
(Russia) D Matsukevich	4	4
(Lithuania) L Grigelis	6	7
5	(Ukraine) I Marchenko	1	5

Quarterfinals
1	(France) N Mahut	6	7
7	(Spain) A Brugués-Davi	4	5
3	(France) É Roger-Vasselin	6	6
(Lithuania) L Grigelis	3	2

Semifinals
1	(France) N Mahut	4	6	2
3	(France) É Roger-Vasselin	6	3	6

=== Bottom half ===
First round
8	(Slovakia) L Lacko	6^{2}	7	6
(France) R Jouan	7^{7}	5	4
WC	(France) P-H Herbert	6	6
LL	(Switzerland) Adrien Bossel	3	2
(France) F Martin	6	7^{7}
(United Kingdom) D Evans	3	6^{5}
Q	(France) Élie Rousset	7	5	7^{8}
4	(France) K de Schepper	5	7	6^{6}
6	(France) A Clément	6	7^{7}
(Slovakia) M Mečíř Jr.	3	6^{5}
WC	(France) Julien Obry	6	6
(Republic of Ireland) C Niland	2	2
(Belgium) D Goffin	6	6
Q	(France) A Escoffier	0	4
(Ukraine) S Bubka	4	7^{9}	6^{7}
2	(Belgium) S Darcis	6	6^{7}	7^{9}

Second round
8	(Slovakia) L Lacko	6	7^{7}
WC	(France) P-H Herbert	4	6^{4}
(France) F Martin	3	3
Q	(France) É Rousset	6	6
6	(France) A Clément	6	7
WC	(France) J Obry	4	5
(Belgium) D Goffin	6^{4}	1
2	(Belgium) S Darcis	7^{7}	6

Quarterfinals
8	(Slovakia) L Lacko	6	4	6
Q	(France) É Rousset	3	6	3
6	(France) A Clément	6	6
2	(Belgium) S Darcis	3	4

Semifinals
8	(Slovakia) L Lacko	7^{7}	3	3
6	(France) A Clément	6^{3}	6	6
