= 2010 Trophée des Alpilles =

- Date: September 7 – 12
- Edition: 2nd
- Surface: Hard
- Location: Saint-Rémy-de-Provence, France

Champions

Singles
- (Poland) Jerzy Janowicz

Doubles
- (Luxembourg) Gilles Müller / (France) Édouard Roger-Vasselin
← 2009 ·	Trophée des Alpilles	· 2011 →

The 2010 Trophée des Alpilles was a professional tennis tournament played on hard courts. It was the 2nd edition of the tournament which was part of the 2010 ATP Challenger Tour. It took place in Saint-Rémy-de-Provence, France between 7 and 12 September.

== ATP entrants ==
=== Seeds ===
Nationality	Player	Ranking*	Seeding
GER	Rainer Schüttler	91	1
RUS	Igor Kunitsyn	112	2
FRA	Édouard Roger-Vasselin	115	3
FRA	David Guez	122	4
SUI	Stéphane Bohli	129	5
FRA	Josselin Ouanna	137	6
FRA	Adrian Mannarino	152	7
IRL	Conor Niland	153	8

- Rankings are as of August 30, 2010.

=== Other entrants ===
The following players received wildcards into the singles main draw:

- (France) Pierre-Hugues Herbert
- (France) Jonathan Hilaire
- (France) Jérôme Inzerillo
- (Germany) Rainer Schüttler

The following players received entry from the qualifying draw:

- (Switzerland) George Bastl
- (France) Olivier Charroin
- (Lithuania) Laurynas Grigelis
- (France) Alexandre Renard

The following players received entry as a lucky loser:

- (France) Dorian Descloix
- (Latvia) Deniss Pavlovs

== Champions ==
=== Singles ===
(Poland) Jerzy Janowicz def. (France) Édouard Roger-Vasselin, 3–6, 7–6(8), 7–6(6)

=== Doubles ===
(Luxembourg) Gilles Müller / (France) Édouard Roger-Vasselin def. (Latvia) Andis Juška / (Latvia) Deniss Pavlovs, 6–0, 2–6, [13–11]
