= 2015 Trophée des Alpilles – Doubles =

Doubles
- 2015 Trophée des Alpilles

Final
- Champion: (United Kingdom) Ken Skupski (United Kingdom) Neal Skupski
- Runner-up: (Slovakia) Andrej Martin (Slovakia) Igor Zelenay
- Score: 6–4, 6–1

Events
Singles	Doubles
← 2014 ·	Trophée des Alpilles	· 2016 →

Pierre-Hugues Herbert and Konstantin Kravchuk was the defending champion, but chose not to defend their title.

== Seeds ==
1. (United Kingdom) Ken Skupski / (United Kingdom) Neal Skupski (champions)
2. (Slovakia) Andrej Martin / (Slovakia) Igor Zelenay (final)
3. (Italy) Erik Crepaldi / (France) Yannick Jankovits (semifinals)
4. (Slovakia) Norbert Gombos / (Slovakia) Lukáš Lacko (semifinals, withdrew)

== Draw ==
=== Key ===
- Q = Qualifier
- WC = Wild card
- LL = Lucky loser
- Alt = Alternate
- SE = Special exempt
- PR = Protected ranking
- ITF = ITF entry
- JE = Junior exempt
- w/o = Walkover
- r = Retired
- d = Defaulted
- SR = Special ranking

First round
(Switzerland) M Chiudinelli (Germany) T Pütz	6	6
(France) J Eysseric (France) D Guez	1	2
3	(Italy) Erik Crepaldi (France) Y Jankovits	6	1	[10]
(Republic of Ireland) J Cluskey (Germany) N Langer	2	6	[3]
(Republic of Ireland) S Barry (Netherlands) S Griekspoor	6	6
WC	(France) Alexandre Buchner (France) Boris Vermet	2	1
WC	(France) A Muller (France) M Vaïsse	6	6
WC	(France) Constantin Belot (France) Noe Khlif	4	3
(Belgium) Y Mertens (France) V Millot
4	(Slovakia) N Gombos (Slovakia) L Lacko	w/o
(France) H Nys (Croatia) F Veger	6	7^{7}
(Belarus) I Ivashka (Russia) A Karatsev	2	6^{4}

Quarterfinals
1	(United Kingdom) K Skupski (United Kingdom) N Skupski	7^{7}	6
(Switzerland) M Chiudinelli (Germany) T Pütz	6^{5}	1
3	(Italy) E Crepaldi (France) Y Jankovits	w/o
(Republic of Ireland) S Barry (Netherlands) S Griekspoor
WC	(France) A Muller (France) M Vaïsse	6	1	[8]
4	(Slovakia) N Gombos (Slovakia) L Lacko	3	6	[10]
(France) H Nys (Croatia) F Veger	6	3	[7]
2	(Slovakia) A Martin (Slovakia) I Zelenay	4	6	[10]

Semifinals
1	(United Kingdom) K Skupski (United Kingdom) N Skupski	6	6
3	(Italy) E Crepaldi (France) Y Jankovits	2	3
4	(Slovakia) N Gombos (Slovakia) L Lacko
2	(Slovakia) A Martin (Slovakia) I Zelenay	w/o

Final
1	(United Kingdom) K Skupski (United Kingdom) N Skupski	6	6
2	(Slovakia) A Martin (Slovakia) I Zelenay	4	1
