= 2013 Trophée des Alpilles =

- Date: 2–8 September
- Edition: 5th
- Surface: Hard
- Location: Saint-Rémy-de-Provence, France

Champions

Singles
- (France) Marc Gicquel

Doubles
- (France) Pierre-Hugues Herbert / (France) Albano Olivetti
← 2012 ·	Trophée des Alpilles	· 2014 →

The 2013 Trophée des Alpilles was a professional tennis tournament played on hard courts. It was the fifth edition of the tournament which was part of the 2013 ATP Challenger Tour. It took place in Saint-Rémy-de-Provence, France between 2 and 8 September 2013.

== Singles main-draw entrants ==
=== Seeds ===
Country	Player	Rank^{1}	Seed
FRA	Kenny de Schepper	69	1
SVK	Lukáš Lacko	84	2
FRA	Paul-Henri Mathieu	107	3
POL	Michał Przysiężny	108	4
FRA	Marc Gicquel	119	5
ITA	Matteo Viola	138	6
KAZ	Andrey Golubev	141	7
ITA	Flavio Cipolla	158	8

- ^{1} Rankings are as of August 26, 2013.

=== Other entrants ===
The following players received wildcards into the singles main draw:

- (France) Martin Vaïsse
- (France) Enzo Couacaud
- (France) Maxime Chazal
- (Russia) Konstantin Kravchuk

The following players received entry from the qualifying draw:

- (Russia) Denis Matsukevich
- (United Kingdom) David Rice
- (France) Yannick Jankovits
- (India) Purav Raja

The following players received entry as a lucky loser the singles main draw:

- (Brazil) Marcelo Demoliner

== Champions ==
=== Singles ===
- (France) Marc Gicquel def. (Italy) Matteo Viola 6–4, 6–3

=== Doubles ===
- (France) Pierre-Hugues Herbert / (France) Albano Olivetti def. (France) Marc Gicquel / (France) Josselin Ouanna 6–3, 6–7^{(5–7)}, [15–13]
