= 2009 Trophée des Alpilles – Doubles =

Doubles
- 2009 Trophée des Alpilles

Final
- Champions: (Czech Republic) Jiří Krkoška (Slovakia) Lukáš Lacko
- Runners-up: (Belgium) Ruben Bemelmans (Belgium) Niels Desein
- Score: 6–1, 3–6, [10–3]

Events
Singles	Doubles
← 2008 ·	Trophée des Alpilles	· 2010 →

Jiří Krkoška and Lukáš Lacko won in the final 6–1, 3–6, [10–3], against Ruben Bemelmans and Niels Desein.

== Seeds ==
All seed pairs received a bye to the first round.

1. (United Kingdom) Colin Fleming / (United Kingdom) Ken Skupski (quarterfinals)
2. (India) Rohan Bopanna / (France) Olivier Charroin (semifinals)
3. (Belgium) Ruben Bemelmans / (Belgium) Niels Desein (final)
4. (United Kingdom) Alex Bogdanovic / (Russia) Alexandre Kudryavtsev (quarterfinals, withdrew)

== Draw ==
=== Key ===
- Q = Qualifier
- WC = Wild card
- LL = Lucky loser
- Alt = Alternate
- SE = Special exempt
- PR = Protected ranking
- ITF = ITF entry
- JE = Junior exempt
- w/o = Walkover
- r = Retired
- d = Defaulted
- SR = Special ranking

=== Draw ===
First round
(France) J Eysseric (France) D Guez	6	6
WC	(France) M Rodrigues (France) C Saulnier	4	5
(Germany) B Dorsch (Germany) B Phau	6	3	[8]
(Monaco) T Oger (France) N Renavand	4	6	[10]
WC	(France) F Maury (France) B Perrot	2	3
(Czech Republic) J Krkoška (Slovakia) L Lacko	6	6
(France) S de Chaunac (France) N Mahut
(Switzerland) G Bastl (Germany) D Meffert	w/o

Quarterfinals
1	(United Kingdom) C Fleming (United Kingdom) K Skupski	6	6^{3}	[6]
(France) J Eysseric (France) D Guez	3	7	[10]
3	(Belgium) R Bemelmans (Belgium) N Desein	3	6	[10]
(Monaco) T Oger (France) N Renavand	6	2	[7]
(Czech Republic) J Krkoška (Slovakia) L Lacko
4	(United Kingdom) A Bogdanovic (Russia) A Kudryavtsev	w/o
(France) S de Chaunac (France) N Mahut	3	4
2	(India) R Bopanna (France) O Charroin	6	6

Semifinals
(France) J Eysseric (France) D Guez	4	3
3	(Belgium) R Bemelmans (Belgium) N Desein	6	6
(Czech Republic) J Krkoška (Slovakia) L Lacko	6	0	[11]
2	(India) R Bopanna (France) O Charroin	4	6	[9]

Finals
3	(Belgium) R Bemelmans (Belgium) N Desein	1	6	[3]
(Czech Republic) J Krkoška (Slovakia) L Lacko	6	3	[10]
