= 2016 Trophée des Alpilles – Doubles =

Doubles
- 2016 Trophée des Alpilles

Final
- Champions: (United Kingdom) Ken Skupski (United Kingdom) Neal Skupski
- Runners-up: (Republic of Ireland) David O'Hare (United Kingdom) Joe Salisbury
- Score: 6–7^{(5–7)}, 6–4, [10–5]

Events
| Singles | Doubles |
| ← 2015 · | Trophée des Alpilles | · 2017 → |

Ken and Neal Skupski were the defending champions and successfully defended their title, defeating David O'Hare and Joe Salisbury 6–7^{(5–7)}, 6–4, [10–5] in the final.

== Seeds ==
1. (India) Purav Raja / (India) Divij Sharan (first round)
2. (United Kingdom) Ken Skupski / (United Kingdom) Neal Skupski (champions)
3. (Russia) Konstantin Kravchuk / (New Zealand) Artem Sitak (first round)
4. (France) Grégoire Barrère / (France) Albano Olivetti (semifinals)

== Draw ==
Key

- Q = Qualifier
- WC = Wild card
- LL = Lucky loser
- Alt = Alternate
- ITF = ITF entry
- PR = Protected ranking
- SR = Special ranking
- SE = Special exempt
- JE = Junior exempt
- JR = Junior Accelerator Programme entrant
- CO = College Accelerator Programme entrant
- NG = Next Gen Accelerator Program entrant
- w/o = Walkover
- r = Retired
- d = Defaulted

First round
1 | (India) P Raja (India) D Sharan | 6 | 2 | [5]
(Republic of Ireland) D O'Hare (United Kingdom) J Salisbury | 3 | 6 | [10]
PR | (Germany) M Bachinger (Germany) P Gojowczyk | 6^{2} | 6 | [11]
(Russia) D Medvedev (Italy) M Viola | 7^{7} | 4 | [9]
4 | (France) G Barrère (France) A Olivetti | 7^{10} | 7^{10}
WC | (France) M Janvier (France) R Jouan | 6^{8} | 6^{8}
(Belgium) K Coppejans (Belgium) Y Mertens | 6 | 3 | [6]
(Croatia) T Draganja (Spain) A Menéndez-Maceiras | 2 | 6 | [10]
(Romania) M Copil (Ukraine) S Stakhovsky | 6 | 6
WC | (France) Alexandre Buchner (France) Boris Vermet | 1 | 3
(Croatia) I Sabanov (Croatia) M Sabanov | 2 | 6 | [10]
3 | (Russia) K Kravchuk (New Zealand) A Sitak | 6 | 3 | [6]
WC | (France) Cyril Respaut (France) Nathan Seateun | 2 | 4
(Croatia) A Pavić (Bosnia and Herzegovina) A Šetkić | 6 | 6
(Belgium) R Bemelmans (Belgium) J De Loore | 6^{2} | 4
2 | (United Kingdom) K Skupski (United Kingdom) N Skupski | 7^{7} | 6

Quarterfinals
(Republic of Ireland) D O'Hare (United Kingdom) J Salisbury | 6 | 6
PR | (Germany) M Bachinger (Germany) P Gojowczyk | 3 | 3
4 | (France) G Barrère (France) A Olivetti | 6 | 7^{7}
(Croatia) T Draganja (Spain) A Menéndez-Maceiras | 4 | 6^{3}
(Romania) M Copil (Ukraine) S Stakhovsky
(Croatia) I Sabanov (Croatia) M Sabanov | w/o
(Croatia) A Pavić (Bosnia and Herzegovina) A Šetkić | 3 | 6^{1}
2 | (United Kingdom) K Skupski (United Kingdom) N Skupski | 6 | 7^{7}

Semifinals
(Republic of Ireland) D O'Hare (United Kingdom) J Salisbury | 6 | 6
4 | (France) G Barrère (France) A Olivetti | 2 | 4
(Croatia) I Sabanov (Croatia) M Sabanov | 2 | 2
2 | (United Kingdom) K Skupski (United Kingdom) N Skupski | 6 | 6

Final
(Republic of Ireland) D O'Hare (United Kingdom) J Salisbury | 7^{7} | 4 | [5]
2 | (United Kingdom) K Skupski (United Kingdom) N Skupski | 6^{5} | 6 | [10]
