= 2015 Trophée des Alpilles =

- Date: 7–13 September
- Edition: 7th
- Surface: Hard
- Location: Saint-Rémy-de-Provence, France

Champions

Singles
- (Croatia) Ivan Dodig

Doubles
- (United Kingdom) Ken Skupski / (United Kingdom) Neal Skupski
← 2014 ·	Trophée des Alpilles	· 2016 →

The 2015 Trophée des Alpilles was a professional tennis tournament played on hard courts. It was the seventh edition of the tournament which was part of the 2015 ATP Challenger Tour. It took place in Saint-Rémy-de-Provence, France between 7 and 13 September 2015.

== Singles main-draw entrants ==
=== Seeds ===
Country	Player	Rank^{1}	Seed
SVK	Lukáš Lacko	116	1
GER	Matthias Bachinger	118	2
SVK	Norbert Gombos	125	3
GBR	James Ward	135	4
CRO	Ivan Dodig	136	5
POL	~~Michał Przysiężny~~	~~143~~	6
SVK	Andrej Martin	156	7
FRA	Vincent Millot	174	8

- ^{1} Rankings are as of August 31, 2015.

=== Other entrants ===
The following players received wildcards into the singles main draw:

- (France) Sébastien Boltz
- (Croatia) Ivan Dodig
- (France) Jonathan Hilaire
- (France) Martin Vaïsse

The following players received entry as alternates:

- (Republic of Ireland) Sam Barry
- (France) Hugo Nys

The following players received entry from the qualifying draw:

- (France) Constantin Belot
- (France) Hugo Grenier
- (France) Alexandre Müller
- (Croatia) Filip Veger

The following player received entry as a lucky loser:

- (France) Nino Portales

== Champions ==
=== Singles ===
- (Croatia) Ivan Dodig def. (Germany) Nils Langer 6–3, 6–2

=== Doubles ===
- (United Kingdom) Ken Skupski / (United Kingdom) Neal Skupski def. (Slovakia) Andrej Martin / (Slovakia) Igor Zelenay 6–4, 6–1
