= 2009 Trophée des Alpilles – Singles =

Singles
- 2009 Trophée des Alpilles

Final
- Champion: (Cyprus) Marcos Baghdatis
- Runner-up: (Belgium) Xavier Malisse
- Score: 6–4, 6–1

Events
Singles	Doubles
← 2008 ·	Trophée des Alpilles	· 2010 →

3rd-seeded Marcos Baghdatis became the first champion of this event, after winning against unseeded Xavier Malisse 6–4, 6–1 in the final.

== Seeds ==
1. (Germany) Björn Phau (semifinals)
2. (France) Adrian Mannarino (first round, retired due to right knee injury)
3. (Cyprus) Marcos Baghdatis (champion)
4. (Germany) Michael Berrer (second round)
5. (France) Nicolas Mahut (quarterfinals)
6. (Switzerland) Stéphane Bohli (quarterfinals)
7. (France) Sébastien de Chaunac (quarterfinals)
8. (Slovakia) Lukáš Lacko (semifinals)

== Draw ==
=== Key ===
- Q = Qualifier
- WC = Wild card
- LL = Lucky loser
- Alt = Alternate
- SE = Special exempt
- PR = Protected ranking
- ITF = ITF entry
- JE = Junior exempt
- w/o = Walkover
- r = Retired
- d = Defaulted
- SR = Special ranking

=== Final four ===
Semifinals
1	(Germany) Björn Phau	6^{5}	6^{6}
3	(Cyprus) Marcos Baghdatis	7	7
(Belgium) Xavier Malisse	5	6	6
8	(Slovakia) Lukáš Lacko	7	4	4

Final
3	(Cyprus) Marcos Baghdatis	6	6
(Belgium) Xavier Malisse	4	1

=== Top half ===
First round
1	(Germany) B Phau	6	6
(Belgium) N Desein	1	2
(Switzerland) G Bastl	6	6
(Belgium) R Bemelmans	3	2
(Italy) R Ghedin	4	4
(France) T Ascione	6	6
(United Kingdom) J Goodall	1	2
7	(France) S de Chaunac	6	6
3	(Cyprus) M Baghdatis	6	6
(United Kingdom) D Evans	3	2
(Germany) D Meffert	6^{3}	6	6
(South Korea) K-t Im	7	4	4
Q	(France) D Descloix	6	3	3
Q	(Monaco) T Oger	4	6	6
(United Kingdom) A Bogdanovic	6^{5}	1
6	(Switzerland) S Bohli	7	6

Second round
1	(Germany) B Phau	6	6
(Switzerland) G Bastl	2	2
(France) T Ascione	5	2
7	(France) S de Chaunac	7	6
3	(Cyprus) M Baghdatis
(Germany) D Meffert	w/o
Q	(Monaco) T Oger	3	6^{5}
6	(Switzerland) S Bohli	6	7

Quarterfinals
1	(Germany) B Phau	7	6
7	(France) S de Chaunac	6^{1}	4
3	(Cyprus) M Baghdatis	7	6
6	(Switzerland) S Bohli	6^{5}	3

Semifinals
1	(Germany) B Phau	6^{5}	6^{6}
3	(Cyprus) M Baghdatis	7	7

=== Bottom half ===
First round
5	(France) N Mahut	6	7
(Russia) A Kudryavtsev	4	5
Q	(France) T Paire	3	6	6^{8}
WC	(France) J Hilaire	6	2	7
(Belgium) X Malisse	6	6
(Japan) Y Sugita	1	1
(Slovakia) D Hrbatý	3	4
4	(Germany) M Berrer	6	6
8	(Slovakia) L Lacko	6	6
WC	(France) M Rodrigues	2	2
Q	(United Kingdom) C Fleming	5	4
WC	(France) J Eysseric	7	6
(France) D Guez	6	6
(Germany) B Dorsch	2	0
WC	(France) C Saulnier	4	6	2
2	(France) A Mannarino	6	4	0^{r}

Second round
5	(France) N Mahut	6	6
WC	(France) J Hilaire	3	3
(Belgium) X Malisse	6	6
4	(Germany) M Berrer	4	4
8	(Slovakia) L Lacko	6	6
WC	(France) J Eysseric	4	3
(France) D Guez	6	7
WC	(France) C Saulnier	3	6^{5}

Quarterfinals
5	(France) N Mahut	4	7	1
(Belgium) X Malisse	6	6^{6}	6
8	(Slovakia) L Lacko	6	6
(France) D Guez	3	0

Semifinals
(Belgium) X Malisse	5	6	6
8	(Slovakia) L Lacko	7	4	4
