= 2011 Trophée des Alpilles – Doubles =

Doubles
- 2011 Trophée des Alpilles

Final
- Champions: (France) Pierre-Hugues Herbert (France) Édouard Roger-Vasselin
- Runners-up: (France) Arnaud Clément (France) Nicolas Renavand
- Score: 6–0, 4–6, [10–7]

Events
Singles	Doubles
← 2010 ·	Trophée des Alpilles	· 2012 →

Gilles Müller and Édouard Roger-Vasselin were the defending champions but Müller decided not to participate.

Roger-Vasselin played alongside Pierre-Hugues Herbert. They went on to win the title by defeating Arnaud Clément and Nicolas Renavand 6–0, 4–6, [10–7] in the final.

== Seeds ==
1. (France) Arnaud Clément / (France) Nicolas Renavand (final)
2. (France) Olivier Charroin / (India) Purav Raja (semifinals)
3. (France) Pierre-Hugues Herbert / (France) Édouard Roger-Vasselin (champion)
4. (United Kingdom) David Rice / (United Kingdom) Sean Thornley (quarterfinals)

== Draw ==
=== Key ===
- Q = Qualifier
- WC = Wild card
- LL = Lucky loser
- Alt = Alternate
- SE = Special exempt
- PR = Protected ranking
- ITF = ITF entry
- JE = Junior exempt
- w/o = Walkover
- r = Retired
- d = Defaulted
- SR = Special ranking

=== Draw ===
First round
1	(France) A Clément (France) N Renavand	w/o
(Germany) A Begemann (Finland) M Kontinen
(Belarus) U Ignatik (Russia) D Matsukevich	6	6^{7}	[10]
(Slovakia) L Lacko (Slovakia) M Mečíř Jr.	4	7^{9}	[6]
4	(United Kingdom) D Rice (United Kingdom) S Thornley	w/o
(United Kingdom) D Evans (Finland) H Kontinen
(France) Stéphane Costes (France) David Couronne	2	5
WC	(France) A Escoffier (France) Martin Vaïsse	6	7
(France) Dorian Descloix (France) Élie Rousset	6	6
(France) G Burquier (France) R Jouan	3	4
(France) Hugo Gallinaro (France) Bertrand Vigouroux	3	0
3	(France) P-H Herbert (France) É Roger-Vasselin	6	6
(Lithuania) L Grigelis (Italy) Giuseppe Menga	7	6
(France) Kevin Boumlil (France) Vincent D'Hoir	5	4
(Spain) A Brugués-Davi (France) F Martin	5	4
2	(France) O Charroin (India) P Raja	7	6

Quarterfinals
1	(France) A Clément (France) N Renavand	6^{5}	6	[17]
(Belarus) U Ignatik (Russia) D Matsukevich	7^{7}	4	[15]
4	(United Kingdom) D Rice (United Kingdom) S Thornley	2	5
WC	(France) A Escoffier (France) M Vaïsse	6	7
(France) D Descloix (France) É Rousset	4	4
3	(France) P-H Herbert (France) É Roger-Vasselin	6	6
(Lithuania) L Grigelis (Italy) G Menga	4	2
2	(France) O Charroin (India) P Raja	6	6

Semifinals
1	(France) A Clément (France) N Renavand	7^{8}	6
WC	(France) A Escoffier (France) M Vaïsse	6^{6}	2
3	(France) P-H Herbert (France) É Roger-Vasselin	6	3	[10]
2	(France) O Charroin (India) P Raja	3	6	[7]

Final
1	(France) A Clément (France) N Renavand	0	6	[7]
3	(France) P-H Herbert (France) É Roger-Vasselin	6	4	[10]
