= 2014 Trophée des Alpilles =

- Date: 1–7 September
- Edition: 6th
- Surface: Hard
- Location: Saint-Rémy-de-Provence, France

Champions

Singles
- (France) Nicolas Mahut

Doubles
- (France) Pierre-Hugues Herbert / (Russia) Konstantin Kravchuk
← 2013 ·	Trophée des Alpilles	· 2015 →

The 2014 Trophée des Alpilles was a professional tennis tournament played on hard courts. It was the sixth edition of the tournament which was part of the 2014 ATP Challenger Tour. It took place in Saint-Rémy-de-Provence, France between 1 and 7 September 2014.

== Singles main-draw entrants ==
=== Seeds ===
Country	Player	Rank^{1}	Seed
FRA	Paul-Henri Mathieu	81	1
UKR	Sergiy Stakhovsky	93	2
FRA	Nicolas Mahut	103	3
FRA	Kenny de Schepper	105	4
RUS	Evgeny Donskoy	118	5
SVK	Norbert Gomboš	129	6
FRA	Pierre-Hugues Herbert	136	7
JPN	Hiroki Moriya	149	8

- ^{1} Rankings are as of August 25, 2014.

=== Other entrants ===
The following players received wildcards into the singles main draw:

- (France) Maxime Chazal
- (France) Nicolas Mahut
- (Ukraine) Vitalii Shcherba
- (France) Martin Vaïsse

The following players entered into the singles main draw as alternates:

- (Germany) Richard Becker
- (France) Florent Serra

The following player entered into the singles main draw as a lucky loser:

- (Switzerland) Michael Lammer

The following players received entry from the qualifying draw:

- (Belarus) Sergey Betov
- (Israel) Bar Tzuf Botzer
- (Italy) Erik Crepaldi
- (Croatia) Filip Veger

== Champions ==
=== Singles ===
- (France) Nicolas Mahut def. (France) Vincent Millot 6–7^{(3–7)}, 6–4, 6–3

=== Doubles ===
- (France) Pierre-Hugues Herbert / (Russia) Konstantin Kravchuk def. (France) David Guez / (France) Martin Vaïsse 6–1, 7–6^{(7–3)}
