= 2011 Trophée des Alpilles =

- Date: 5–11 September
- Edition: 3rd
- Surface: Hard
- Location: Saint-Rémy-de-Provence, France

Champions

Singles
- (France) Édouard Roger-Vasselin

Doubles
- (France) Pierre-Hugues Herbert / (France) Édouard Roger-Vasselin
← 2010 ·	Trophée des Alpilles	· 2012 →

The 2011 Trophée des Alpilles was a professional tennis tournament played on hard courts. It was the third edition of the tournament which was part of the 2011 ATP Challenger Tour. It took place in Saint-Rémy-de-Provence, France between 5 and 11 September 2011.

== ATP entrants ==
=== Seeds ===
Country	Player	Rank^{1}	Seed
FRA	Nicolas Mahut	99	1
BEL	Steve Darcis	102	2
FRA	Édouard Roger-Vasselin	110	3
FRA	Kenny de Schepper	135	4
UKR	Illya Marchenko	149	5
FRA	Arnaud Clément	153	6
ESP	Arnau Brugués Davi	156	7
SVK	Lukáš Lacko	162	8

- ^{1} Rankings are as of August 29, 2011.

=== Other entrants ===
The following players received wildcards into the singles main draw:

- (France) Pierre-Hugues Herbert
- (France) Jonathan Hilaire
- (France) Julien Obry
- (France) Nicolas Renavand

The following players received entry as an alternate into the singles main draw:

- (France) Josselin Ouanna

The following players received entry from the qualifying draw:

- (France) Antoine Escoffier
- (Germany) Sami Reinwein
- (United Kingdom) David Rice
- (France) Élie Rousset

== Champions ==
=== Singles ===
(France) Édouard Roger-Vasselin def. (France) Arnaud Clément, 6–4, 6–3

=== Doubles ===
(France) Pierre-Hugues Herbert / (France) Édouard Roger-Vasselin def. (France) Arnaud Clément / (France) Nicolas Renavand, 6–0, 4–6, [10–7]
