= 2009 Trophée des Alpilles =

Tennis tournament

- Date: 7–13 September
- Edition: 1st
- Surface: Hard
- Location: Saint-Rémy-de-Provence, France

Champions

Singles
- (Cyprus) Marcos Baghdatis

Doubles
- (Czech Republic) Jiří Krkoška / (Slovakia) Lukáš Lacko
Trophée des Alpilles	· 2010 →

The 2009 Trophée des Alpilles was a professional tennis tournament played on outdoor hard courts. It was the first edition of the tournament which was part of the 2009 ATP Challenger Tour. It took place in Saint-Rémy-de-Provence, France between 7 and 13 September 2009.

== Singles main-draw entrants ==
=== Seeds ===
Nationality	Player	Ranking*	Seeding
GER	Björn Phau	84	1
FRA	Adrian Mannarino	91	2
CYP	Marcos Baghdatis	110	3
GER	Michael Berrer	120	4
FRA	Nicolas Mahut	127	5
SUI	Stéphane Bohli	144	6
FRA	Sébastien de Chaunac	149	7
SVK	Lukáš Lacko	156	8

- Rankings are as of August 31, 2009.

=== Other entrants ===
The following players received wildcards into the singles main draw:

- (France) Jonathan Eysseric
- (France) Jonathan Hilaire
- (France) Mathieu Rodrigues
- (France) Cyril Saulnier

The following players received entry from the qualifying draw:

- (France) Dorian Descloix
- (United Kingdom) Colin Fleming
- (Monaco) Thomas Oger
- (France) Thomas Paire

== Champions ==
=== Singles ===
(Cyprus) Marcos Baghdatis def. (Belgium) Xavier Malisse, 6–4, 6–1

=== Doubles ===
(Czech Republic) Jiří Krkoška / (Slovakia) Lukáš Lacko def. (Belgium) Ruben Bemelmans / (Belgium) Niels Desein, 6–1, 3–6, [10–3]
