= 2016 Trophée des Alpilles =

- Date: 6–11 September
- Edition: 8th
- Surface: Hard
- Location: Saint-Rémy-de-Provence, France

Champions

Singles
- (Russia) Daniil Medvedev

Doubles
- (United Kingdom) Ken Skupski / (United Kingdom) Neal Skupski
← 2015 ·	Trophée des Alpilles	· 2017 →

The 2016 Trophée des Alpilles is a professional tennis tournament played on hard courts. It is the eighth edition of the tournament which is part of the 2016 ATP Challenger Tour. It was held in Saint-Rémy-de-Provence, France between 6 and 11 September 2016.

== Singles main-draw entrants ==
=== Seeds ===
Country	Player	Rank^{1}	Seed
UKR	Sergiy Stakhovsky	92	1
RUS	Konstantin Kravchuk	93	2
ARG	Leonardo Mayer	117	3
ARG	Marco Trungelliti	130	4
GER	Tobias Kamke	136	5
FRA	Quentin Halys	139	6
GER	Peter Gojowczyk	151	7
BEL	Kimmer Coppejans	152	8

- ^{1} Rankings are as of August 29, 2016.

=== Other entrants ===
The following players received wildcards into the singles main draw:

- (France) Maxime Janvier
- (Germany) Matthias Bachinger
- (France) Alexandre Müller
- (France) Laurent Lokoli

The following player received entry as an alternate:

- (Croatia) Ante Pavić

The following players received entry from the qualifying draw:

- (Italy) Erik Crepaldi
- (France) Albano Olivetti
- (France) Romain Jouan
- (France) Hugo Grenier

== Champions ==
=== Singles ===
- (Russia) Daniil Medvedev def. (Belgium) Joris De Loore, 6–3, 6–3.

=== Doubles ===
- (United Kingdom) Ken Skupski / (United Kingdom) Neal Skupski def. (Republic of Ireland) David O'Hare / (United Kingdom) Joe Salisbury, 6–7^{(5–7)}, 6–4, [10–5].
