= 2012 Trophée des Alpilles =

- Date: 3–9 September
- Edition: 4th
- Surface: Hard
- Location: Saint-Rémy-de-Provence, France

Champions

Singles
- (France) Josselin Ouanna

Doubles
- (Lithuania) Laurynas Grigelis / (Belarus) Uladzimir Ignatik
← 2011 ·	Trophée des Alpilles	· 2013 →

The 2012 Trophée des Alpilles was a professional tennis tournament played on hard courts. It was the fourth edition of the tournament which was part of the 2012 ATP Challenger Tour. It took place in Saint-Rémy-de-Provence, France between 3 and 9 September 2012.

== Singles main-draw entrants ==
=== Seeds ===
Country	Player	Rank^{1}	Seed
LUX	Gilles Müller	53	1
ITA	Flavio Cipolla	87	2
BEL	Olivier Rochus	105	3
GER	Matthias Bachinger	115	4
RUS	Evgeny Donskoy	119	5
RUS	Igor Kunitsyn	126	6
FRA	Josselin Ouanna	147	7
POR	Gastão Elias	148	8

- ^{1} Rankings are as of August 27, 2012.

=== Other entrants ===
The following players received wildcards into the singles main draw:

- (France) Antoine Escoffier
- (France) Adrian Mannarino
- (France) Elie Rousset
- (France) Martin Vaisse

The following players received entry from the qualifying draw:

- (Spain) Guillermo Olaso
- (Germany) Sami Reinwein
- (France) Florian Reynet
- (United Kingdom) David Rice

== Champions ==
=== Singles ===
- (France) Josselin Ouanna def. (Italy) Flavio Cipolla, 6–4, 7–5

=== Doubles ===
- (Lithuania) Laurynas Grigelis / (Belarus) Uladzimir Ignatik def. (Spain) Jordi Marsé-Vidri / (Spain) Carles Poch Gradin, 6–7^{(4–7)}, 6–3, [10–6]
