= Deniss Pavlovs =

Latvian tennis player (born 1983)

- Country (sports): Latvia
- Residence: Riga, Latvia
- Born: 15 April 1983 (age 43) Riga, then part of Latvian SSR, Soviet Union
- Height: 1.85 m (6 ft 1 in)
- Plays: Right-handed (two-handed backhand)
- Prize money: $96,567

Singles
- Career record: 7–7 (ATP Tour and Grand Slam main draws, and in Davis Cup)
- Career titles: 0; 0 Challenger, 4 Futures
- Highest ranking: No. 263 (20 July 2009)

Doubles
- Career record: 9–6 (ATP Tour and Grand Slam main draws, and in Davis Cup)
- Career titles: 0; 2 Challenger, 31 Futures
- Highest ranking: No. 155 (28 September 2009)

Team competitions
- Davis Cup: 16–13
- Last updated on: 22 April 2021.

Deniss Pavlovs (born 15 April 1983) is a Latvian former tennis player who competed on the ATP Challenger Tour. On 20 July 2009, he reached his highest ATP singles ranking of World No. 263, whilst his highest doubles ranking of 155 was reached on 23 September 2009.

Pavlovs represented his native country Latvia while competing in the Davis Cup. He had a singles record of 7–7 and a doubles record of 9–6, for a total Davis Cup record of 16–13.

Deniss has reached 12 career singles finals resulting in 4 wins and 8 runners up. In addition, he has reached 56 career doubles finals, winning 33 and losing 23, including a 2–4 record in ATP Challenger Tour finals.

== ATP Challenger and ITF Futures finals ==
=== Singles: 12 (4–8) ===
Legend ATP Challenger (0–0) ITF Futures (4–8)	Finals by surface Hard (2–1) Clay (2–6) Grass (0–0) Carpet (0–1)

Result	W–L	Date	Tournament	Tier	Surface	Opponent	Score
Loss	0–1	Sep 2005	Belarus F1, Minsk	Futures	Clay	(Serbia and Montenegro) Darko Mađarovski	2–6, 1–6
Win	1–1	May 2007	Bosnia & Herzegovina F1, Doboj	Futures	Clay	(Bosnia and Herzegovina) Aldin Šetkić	6–4, 6–3
Win	2–1	Jun 2007	Belarus F4, Minsk	Futures	Clay	(France) Éric Prodon	6–2, 6–2
Loss	2–2	May 2008	Bosnia & Herzegovina F1, Doboj	Futures	Clay	(Serbia) Aleksander Slovic	2–6, 3–6
Loss	2–3	Jun 2008	Belarus F1, Minsk	Futures	Hard	(Belarus) Uladzimir Ignatik	1–6, 0–2 ret.
Loss	2–4	Oct 2008	Bosnia & Herzegovina F7, Mostar	Futures	Clay	(Croatia) Ivan Dodig	3–6, 2–6
Loss	2–5	Oct 2008	Chile F3, Santiago	Futures	Clay	(Argentina) Diego Álvarez	5–7, 2–6
Loss	2–6	Nov 2008	Peru F5, Lima	Futures	Clay	(Argentina) Juan-Martín Aranguren	3–6, 5–7
Win	3–6	Nov 2008	Nicaragua F1, Managua	Futures	Hard	(Ecuador) Carlos Avellán	6–2, 4–6, 6–4
Loss	3–7	Aug 2010	Lithuania F1, Vilnius	Futures	Clay	(Finland) Timo Nieminen	5–7, 2–6
Win	4–7	Dec 2010	Cuba F1, Havana	Futures	Hard	(Guatemala) Christopher Díaz Figueroa	6–2, 6–1
Loss	4–8	Mar 2012	Russia F6, Moscow	Futures	Carpet	(Latvia) Andis Juška	7–6^{(7–3)}, 3–6, 1–6

=== Doubles: 56 (33–23) ===
Legend ATP Challenger (2–4) ITF Futures (31–19)	Finals by surface Hard (8–10) Clay (23–11) Grass (0–0) Carpet (2–2)

Result	W–L	Date	Tournament	Tier	Surface	Partner	Opponents	Score
Loss	0–1	Feb 2005	Germany F5, Mettmann	Futures	Carpet	(Czech Republic) Josef Neštický	(Germany) Lars Uebel (Germany) Marcel Zimmermann	3–6, 4–6
Win	1–1	Oct 2005	Ukraine F1, Gorlovka	Futures	Clay	(Russia) Alexander Markin	(Ukraine) Aleksandr Aksyonov (Ukraine) Vladimir Levin	6–1, 6–3
Loss	1–2	Dec 2005	Israel F2, Ramat HaSharon	Futures	Hard	(Ukraine) Oleksandr Nedovyesov	(Israel) Victor Kolik (Israel) Dudi Sela	3–6, 3–6
Loss	1–3	Mar 2006	Switzerland F1, Wilen	Futures	Carpet	(Georgia (country)) Lado Chikhladze	(Jamaica) Dustin Brown (Germany) Tobias Klein	4–6, 6–4, 5–7
Loss	1–4	May 2006	Italy F14, Naples	Futures	Clay	(Italy) Giancarlo Petrazzuolo	(Brazil) Marcelo Melo (Portugal) Leonardo Tavares	3–6, 2–6
Win	2–4	Aug 2006	Latvia F1, Jūrmala	Futures	Clay	(Estonia) Mait Künnap	(Poland) Radoslav Nijaki (Poland) Kacper Owsian	6–7^{(3–7)}, 6–2, 6–1
Win	3–4	Aug 2006	Lithuania F1, Vilnius	Futures	Clay	(Poland) Tomasz Bednarek	(Belarus) Egor Puntus (Belarus) Serguei Tarasevitch	6–0, 6–1
Loss	3–5	Sep 2006	Poland F11, Szczecin	Futures	Clay	(Russia) Denis Matsukevich	(Poland) Maciej Diłaj (Australia) Raphael Durek	3–6, 6–4, 6–7^{(1–7)}
Win	4–5	Sep 2006	Poland F12, Gliwice	Futures	Clay	(Russia) Denis Matsukevich	(Poland) Robert Godlewski (Slovakia) Filip Polášek	6–7^{(5–7)}, 6–3, 6–4
Loss	4–6	Nov 2006	Helsinki, Finland	Challenger	Hard	(Latvia) Ernests Gulbis	(Netherlands) Jasper Smit (Netherlands) Martijn van Haasteren	6–7^{(6–8)}, 2–6
Loss	4–7	Feb 2007	Italy F1, Bari	Futures	Clay	(Russia) Alexander Krasnorutskiy	(Italy) Alberto Brizzi (Italy) Giancarlo Petrazzuolo	6–3, 2–6, 3–6
Win	5–7	Mar 2007	Italy F3, Rome	Futures	Clay	(Italy) Giancarlo Petrazzuolo	(Czech Republic) Dušan Karol (Greece) Alexandros Jakupovic	6–7^{(6–8)}, 7–6^{(7–1)}, 6–4
Win	6–7	Mar 2007	Sarajevo, Bosnia & Herzegovina	Challenger	Hard	(Latvia) Ernests Gulbis	(Czech Republic) Jan Mertl (Czech Republic) Lukáš Rosol	6–4, 6–3
Win	7–7	May 2007	Bosnia & Herzegovina F1, Doboj	Futures	Clay	(Serbia) Boris Conkic	(Croatia) Nikola Martinovic (Croatia) Roman Kelecic	7–6^{(7–5)}, 3–6, 6–4
Loss	7–8	May 2007	Bosnia & Herzegovina F2, Sarajevo	Futures	Clay	(Serbia) Boris Conkic	(North Macedonia) Lazar Magdinchev (North Macedonia) Predrag Rusevski	1–6, 2–6
Win	8–8	Jun 2007	Bosnia & Herzegovina F4, Prijedor	Futures	Clay	(Spain) Cesar Ferrer-Victoria	(Croatia) Ante Nakic-Alfirevic (Croatia) Marin Bradarić	6–4, 6–4
Loss	8–9	Jun 2007	Ukraine F2, Cherkassy	Futures	Clay	(Montenegro) Goran Tošić	(Russia) Victor Kozin (Russia) Pavel Chekhov	6–4, 1–6, 4–6
Win	9–9	Jun 2007	Ukraine F3, Cherkassy	Futures	Clay	(Ukraine) Oleksandr Nedovyesov	(Ukraine) Aleksandr Yarmola (Ukraine) Aleksandr Agafonov	6–3, 6–4
Loss	9–10	Jun 2007	Belarus F4, Minsk	Futures	Clay	(Ukraine) Oleksandr Nedovyesov	(Russia) Mikhail Elgin (Russia) Alexander Krasnorutskiy	3–6, 4–6
Win	10–10	Mar 2008	Switzerland F3, Vaduz	Futures	Carpet	(Finland) Juho Paukku	(France) Olivier Charroin (Croatia) Ivan Vukovic	7–6^{(7–4)}, 6–3
Win	11–10	May 2008	Bosnia & Herzegovina F1, Doboj	Futures	Clay	(Montenegro) Goran Tošić	(Serbia) David Savić (Croatia) Vilim Visak	6–4, 7–5
Loss	11–11	Jun 2008	Belarus F1, Minsk	Futures	Hard	(Israel) Dekel Valtzer	(Australia) Brydan Klein (Australia) Matthew Ebden	3–6, 2–6
Win	12–11	Jul 2008	Georgia F2, Tbilisi	Futures	Clay	(Italy) Matteo Marrai	(Ukraine) Gleb Alekseenko (Ukraine) Vadim Alekseenko	6–7^{(7–9)}, 6–4, [10–8]
Loss	12–12	Aug 2008	Latvia F1, Jūrmala	Futures	Clay	(Latvia) Pjotrs Necajevs	(Poland) Andriej Kapaś (Poland) Marcin Gawron	3–6, 6–7^{(4–7)}
Loss	12–13	Aug 2008	Belarus F3, Pinsk	Futures	Clay	(Ukraine) Vladyslav Klymenko	(Belarus) Sergey Betov (Belarus) Dzmitry Zhyrmont	3–6, 7–5, [6–10]
Win	13–13	Sep 2008	Bosnia & Herzegovina F6, Mostar	Futures	Clay	(Croatia) Ivan Cerović	(Serbia) Ivan Bjelica (Serbia) Miljan Zekić	7–6^{(7–3)}, 6–2
Win	14–13	Oct 2008	Bosnia & Herzegovina F7, Mostar	Futures	Clay	(Croatia) Ivan Cerović	(Croatia) Nikola Mektić (Croatia) Ivan Zovko	6–2, 7–6^{(7–3)}
Win	15–13	Oct 2008	Chile F2, Santiago	Futures	Clay	(Romania) Cătălin-Ionuț Gârd	(Peru) Mauricio Echazú (Ecuador) Sebastian Rivera	3–6, 7–5, [10–2]
Win	16–13	Oct 2008	Chile F3, Santiago	Futures	Clay	(Romania) Cătălin-Ionuț Gârd	(Chile) Jorge Aguilar (Estonia) Mait Künnap	6–4, 7–5
Win	17–13	Nov 2008	Peru F4, Lima	Futures	Clay	(Romania) Cătălin-Ionuț Gârd	(United States) Stephen Bass (United States) Adam Fass	6–4, 6–2
Loss	17–14	Nov 2008	Nicaragua F1, Managua	Futures	Hard	(Romania) Ioan-Alexandru Cojanu	(Czech Republic) Jiří Krkoška (Canada) Vasek Pospisil	6–7^{(1–7)}, 3–6
Win	18–14	Feb 2009	Italy F1, Bari	Futures	Clay	(Italy) Walter Trusendi	(Italy) Fabio Colangelo (Italy) Marco Crugnola	4–6, 6–3, [10–4]
Loss	18–15	Mar 2009	France F5, Poitiers	Futures	Hard	(Latvia) Andis Juška	(Netherlands) Michel Koning (Australia) Robert Smeets	7–6^{(7–4)}, 4–6, [8–10]
Loss	18–16	Aug 2009	Qarshi, Uzbekistan	Challenger	Hard	(Latvia) Andis Juška	(Australia) Sadik Kadir (India) Purav Raja	3–6, 6–7^{(4–7)}
Win	19–16	Jan 2010	USA F1, Plantation	Futures	Clay	(Italy) Stefano Ianni	(United States) Marcus Fugate (The Bahamas) Timothy Neilly	6–2, 6–2
Win	20–16	Jul 2010	Estonia F1, Kuressaare	Futures	Clay	(Latvia) Andis Juška	(Finland) Harri Heliövaara (Sweden) Michael Ryderstedt	7–5, 7–6^{(8–6)}
Loss	20–17	Aug 2010	Tampere, Finland	Challenger	Clay	(Latvia) Andis Juška	(Portugal) João Sousa (Portugal) Leonardo Tavares	6–7^{(4–7)}, 5–7
Win	21–17	Aug 2010	Lithuania F1, Vilnius	Futures	Clay	(Russia) Mikhail Vasiliev	(Finland) Timo Nieminen (Czech Republic) Michal Schmid	6–3, 6–3
Win	22–17	Aug 2010	Samarkand, Uzbekistan	Challenger	Clay	(Latvia) Andis Juška	(Chinese Taipei) Lee Hsin-han (Chinese Taipei) Yang Tsung-hua	7–5, 6–3
Win	23–17	Sep 2010	Russia F7, Moscow	Futures	Clay	(Russia) Mikhail Elgin	(Russia) Aleksandr Lobkov (Russia) Alexander Rumyantsev	4–6, 6–4, [10–7]
Loss	23–18	Sep 2010	St. Remy, France	Challenger	Hard	(Latvia) Andis Juška	(Luxembourg) Gilles Müller (France) Édouard Roger-Vasselin	0–6, 6–2, [11–13]
Loss	23–19	Nov 2010	Dominican Republic F1, Santo Domingo	Futures	Hard	(Latvia) Miķelis Lībietis	(Venezuela) Piero Luisi (Venezuela) Román Recarte	3–6, 6–3, [8–10]
Loss	23–20	Dec 2010	Dominican Republic F3, Santo Domingo	Futures	Hard	(Latvia) Miķelis Lībietis	(France) Pierre-Hugues Herbert (France) Romain Sichez	6–7^{(8–10)}, 3–6
Win	24–20	Mar 2011	Italy F1, Trento	Futures	Hard	(Italy) Walter Trusendi	(France) Kevin Botti (France) Grégoire Burquier	6–2, 7–5
Win	25–20	Mar 2011	Russia F1, Moscow	Futures	Hard	(Latvia) Andis Juška	(Russia) Mikhail Vasiliev (Russia) Denis Matsukevich	6–4, 7–6^{(7–5)}
Win	26–20	Jul 2011	Estonia F2, Kuressaare	Futures	Clay	(Latvia) Andis Juška	(Estonia) Vladimir Ivanov (Chile) Hans Podlipnik Castillo	6–3, 7–6^{(7–3)}
Win	27–20	Aug 2011	Latvia F1, Jūrmala	Futures	Clay	(Latvia) Andis Juška	(Italy) Claudio Grassi (Italy) Matteo Volante	6–3, 6–4
Loss	27–21	Aug 2011	Russia F6, Moscow	Futures	Clay	(Russia) Andrey Kuznetsov	(Russia) Sergei Krotiouk (Russia) Mikhail Fufygin	4–6, 7–6^{(16–14)}, [8–10]
Win	28–21	Jan 2012	Russia F1, Moscow	Futures	Hard	(Latvia) Andis Juška	(Russia) Andrey Kuznetsov (Russia) Stanislav Vovk	7–6^{(7–1)}, 6–3
Loss	28–22	Jan 2012	Russia F2, Moscow	Futures	Hard	(Latvia) Andis Juška	(Belarus) Aliaksandr Bury (Belarus) Sergey Betov	1–6, 3–6
Win	29–22	Jan 2012	Russia F3, Sergiyev Posad	Futures	Hard	(Latvia) Andis Juška	(Belarus) Andrei Vasilevski (Russia) Ervand Gasparyan	6–1, 6–4
Win	30–22	Feb 2012	Russia F5, Moscow	Futures	Hard	(Latvia) Andis Juška	(Belarus) Sergey Betov (Russia) Denis Matsukevich	6–4, 7–6^{(7–3)}
Win	31–22	Mar 2012	Russia F6, Moscow	Futures	Carpet	(Latvia) Andis Juška	(Belarus) Sergey Betov (Belarus) Andrei Vasilevski	7–6^{(7–5)}, 6–1
Win	32–22	Mar 2012	Russia F7, Tyumen	Futures	Hard	(Latvia) Andis Juška	(Russia) Sergei Krotiouk (Belarus) Andrei Vasilevski	6–3, 6–4
Win	33–22	Apr 2012	Uzbekistan F2, Andijan	Futures	Hard	(Belarus) Uladzimir Ignatik	(Ukraine) Vladyslav Manafov (Belarus) Yaraslav Shyla	6–4, 6–2
Loss	33–23	May 2012	Poland F1, Sobota	Futures	Clay	(Belarus) Aliaksandr Bury	(Poland) Tomasz Bednarek (Poland) Mateusz Kowalczyk	2–6, 7–6^{(7–5)}, [9–11]
