= Jérôme Inzerillo =

French tennis player

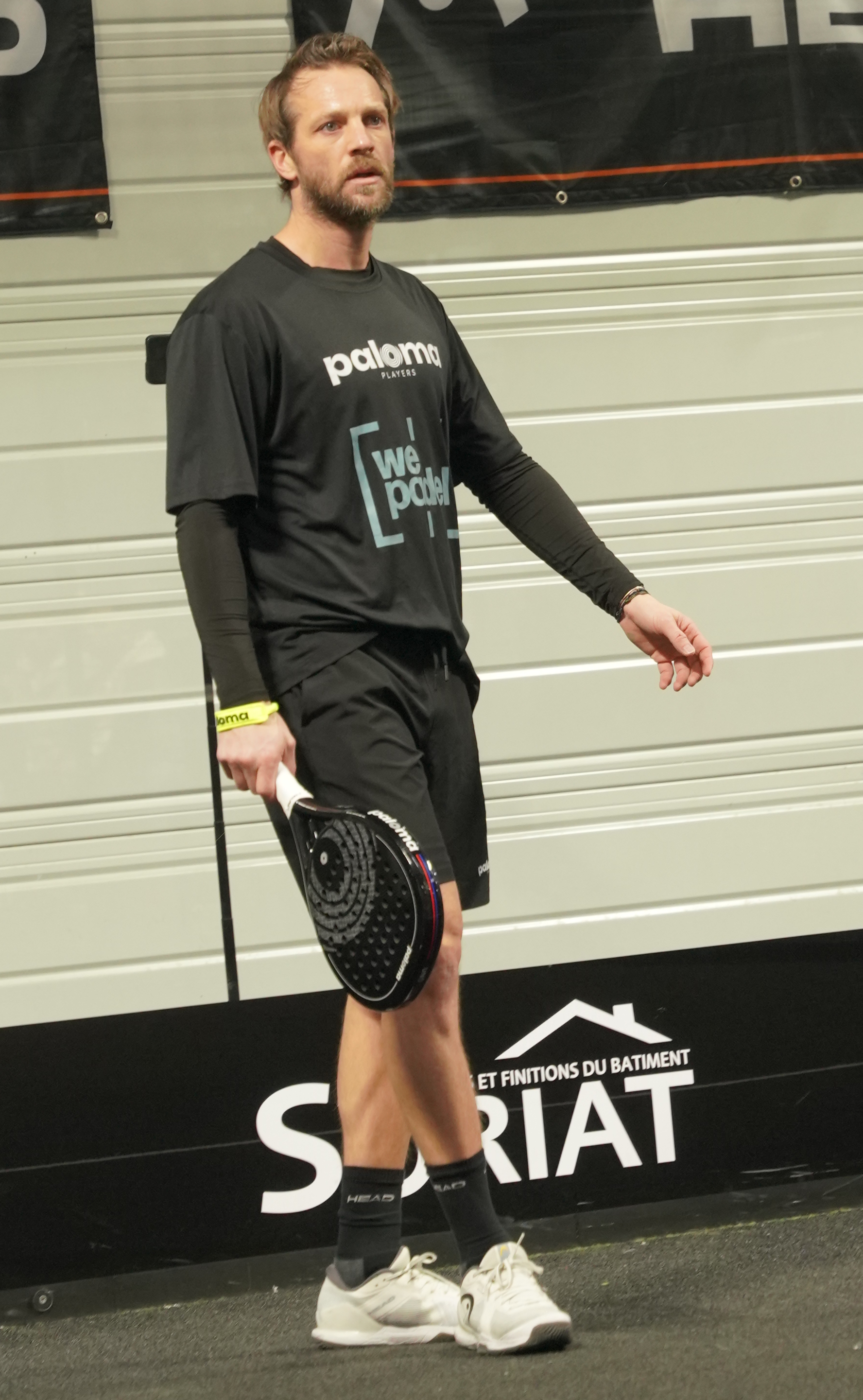
- Country (sports): France
- Residence: Paris, France
- Born: 15 February 1990 (age 36) Marseille, France
- Turned pro: 2008
- Plays: Right-handed
- Prize money: US$60,617

Singles
- Career record: 0–0
- Career titles: 0; 0 Challenger, 3 Futures
- Highest ranking: No. 354 (16 July 2012)

Doubles
- Career record: 0–0
- Career titles: 0; 0 Challenger, 14 Futures
- Highest ranking: No. 319 (15 June 2015)
- Last updated on: 4 January 2022.

Jérôme Inzerillo (born 15 February 1990, in Marseille) is a tennis player from France. He reached a career high ATP singles ranking of No. 354, which he achieved on 16 July 2012, and padel in 2025.

== Career ==
In July 2004, Inzerillo won the U14 European Junior Championships after beating fellow countryman Nassim Slilam in the final, while in the doubles final he won alongside him, beating Spain's pair made of Jose Antonio Fuentes and Andoni Vivanco-Guzmán. He thus became just the fifth player to win both the singles and doubles tournaments in the U14 events, only after Johan Sjögren (1977), Florian Loddenkemper (1984), Kamil Čapkovič (2000), and Novak Djokovic (2001). This victory helped him finish the season as the No. 1 in the Tennis Europe ranking for U14s, ahead of the likes of future Top 50 player Ričardas Berankis.

Inzerillo and Jonathan Eysseric were the 2007 US Open boys doubles champions as a sixth seed. In the semifinals, Inzerillo and Eysseric beat top-seeded Vladimir Ignatic and Roman Jebavý. In the final, they defeated Grigor Dimitrov and Vasek Pospisil.

In January 2019, the AP reported that Inzerillo was one of four French tennis professionals arrested in a large tennis-fixing ring. Up to 100 players were suspected of working for a syndicate led by 28-year old Grigor Sargsyan, known as the Maestro. Sargsyan was arrested and held in a Belgian jail. The scheme was organized via encrypted messages lesser ranked players in smaller tournaments where the prize money of smaller amounts. Sargsyan employed people to place bets on matches at a small enough level to escape the notice of gambling watchdogs. Players would fix games, sets, or matches and receive 500 to 3000 Euros ($570–3400).

== Junior Grand Slam finals ==
=== Doubles: 1 (1 title) ===
Result	Year	Tournament	Surface	Partner	Opponents	Score
Win	2007	US Open	Hard	(France) Jonathan Eysseric	(Bulgaria) Grigor Dimitrov (Canada) Vasek Pospisil	6–2, 6–4

== ATP Challenger and ITF Futures finals ==
=== Singles: 4 (3–1) ===
Legend ATP Challenger (0–0) ITF Futures (3–1)	Finals by surface Hard (2–0) Clay (1–1) Grass (0–0) Carpet (0–0)

Result	W–L	Date	Tournament	Tier	Surface	Opponent	Score
Loss	0–1	Jul 2011	Turkey F21, İzmir	Futures	Clay	(Austria) Michael Linzer	3–6, 2–6
Win	1–1	Apr 2012	Spain F8, Les Franqueses del Vallès	Futures	Hard	(Russia) Aleksandr Lobkov	7–6^{(7–5)}, 6–4
Win	2–1	May 2012	Great Britain F7, Edinburgh	Futures	Clay	(France) Gleb Sakharov	6–7^{(4–7)}, 6–4, 6–2
Win	3–1	Jun 2014	Poland F3, Ślęza	Futures	Hard	(Czech Republic) Jan Šátral	6–3, 6–4

=== Doubles: 31 (14–17) ===
Legend ATP Challenger (0–0) ITF Futures (14–17)	Finals by surface Hard (4–5) Clay (10–12) Grass (0–0) Carpet (0–0)

Result	W–L	Date	Tournament	Tier	Surface	Partner	Opponents	Score
Loss	0–1	Sep 2007	France F14, Plaisir	Futures	Hard	(France) Jonathan Eysseric	(Moldova) Roman Borvanov (France) Clement Reix	7–5, 6–7^{(5–7)}, [7–10]
Win	1–1	Oct 2007	France F16, Nevers	Futures	Hard	(France) Josselin Ouanna	(Australia) Raphael Durek (Poland) Dawid Olejniczak	1–6, 7–6^{(7–4)}, [12–10]
Loss	1–2	Oct 2007	Tunisia F4, Sfax	Futures	Hard	(France) Jonathan Eysseric	(Italy) Andrea Arnaboldi (Tunisia) Walid Jallali	4–6, 2–6
Win	2–2	Oct 2007	Tunisia F5, Monastir	Futures	Hard	(France) Jonathan Eysseric	(Bulgaria) Simeon Ivanov (Bulgaria) Tihomir Grozdanov	6–4, 6–1
Win	3–2	Jun 2010	France F8, Blois	Futures	Clay	(France) Jonathan Eysseric	(France) Pierre-Hugues Herbert (France) Xavier Pujo	6–3, 6–2
Win	4–2	Jul 2010	France F11, Bourg-en-Bresse	Futures	Clay	(France) Romain Jouan	(France) Baptiste Dupuy (France) Clement Reix	7–5, 6–4
Win	5–2	Jul 2010	France F12, Saint-Gervais	Futures	Clay	(France) Romain Jouan	(Canada) Philip Bester (France) Laurent Rochette	2–6, 6–4, [10–7]
Win	6–2	Aug 2010	Slovakia F2, Piešťany	Futures	Clay	(France) Florian Reynet	(Czech Republic) Roman Jebavý (Czech Republic) Marek Michalička	6–4, 4–6, [10–8]
Loss	6–3	Jun 2011	Germany F5, Koeln	Futures	Clay	(Colombia) Sebastian Serrano	(Germany) Dennis Bloemke (Germany) Peter Steinberger	1–6, 5–7
Win	7–3	Apr 2012	Great Britain F6, Bournemouth	Futures	Clay	(Belgium) Arthur De Greef	(United Kingdom) Keelan Oakley (United Kingdom) Matthew Short	3–6, 6–1, [10–8]
Win	8–3	May 2012	Great Britain F7, Edinburgh	Futures	Clay	(Belgium) Arthur De Greef	(France) Gleb Sakharov (France) Alexandre Sidorenko	7–6^{(7–5)}, 3–6, [10–8]
Win	9–3	Sep 2012	Italy F26, Siena	Futures	Clay	(France) Romain Arneodo	(Italy) Marco Crugnola (Russia) Mikhail Vasiliev	6–2, 6–2
Loss	9–4	Mar 2013	Israel F6, Netanya	Futures	Hard	(France) Alexis Musialek	(Chinese Taipei) Chen Ti (Austria) Maximilian Neuchrist	5–7, 3–6
Loss	9–5	Jul 2013	Italy F16, Sassuolo	Futures	Clay	(Switzerland) Luca Margaroli	(Australia) Ryan Agar (Austria) Sebastian Bader	3–6, 5–7
Loss	9–6	Sep 2013	Germany F16, Kenn	Futures	Clay	(France) François-Arthur Vibert	(Netherlands) Sander Groen (Czech Republic) Roman Jebavý	1–6, ret.
Win	10–6	Apr 2014	Iran F5, Kish	Futures	Clay	(France) Martin Vaïsse	(Ukraine) Vadim Alekseenko (Ukraine) Alexandr Kushakov	6–3, 6–2
Loss	10–7	Apr 2014	Iran F6, Kish	Futures	Clay	(France) Martin Vaïsse	(India) Ronak Manuja (India) Akash Wagh	6–2, 1–6, [9–11]
Loss	10–8	Jun 2014	Poland F2, Bydgoszcz	Futures	Clay	(France) Arthur Surreaux	(Czech Republic) Robert Rumler (Czech Republic) Václav Šafránek	6–1, 4–6, [6–10]
Win	11–8	Jun 2014	Poland F3, Ślęza	Futures	Hard	(France) Arthur Surreaux	(Czech Republic) Marek Jaloviec (Czech Republic) Václav Šafránek	4–6, 6–4, [10–3]
Loss	11–9	Aug 2014	Lithuania F1, Vilnius	Futures	Clay	(Ukraine) Marat Deviatiarov	(Moldova) Maxim Dubarenco (United States) Peter Kobelt	6–4, 6–7^{(2–7)}, [8–10]
Loss	11–10	Feb 2015	Iran F4, Kish	Futures	Hard	(France) Jules Marie	(Serbia) Ilija Vucic (Netherlands) Boy Westerhof	3–6, 5–7
Win	12–10	Mar 2015	Iran F5, Kish	Futures	Hard	(France) Jules Marie	(Venezuela) Jordi Muñoz Abreu (Netherlands) Mark Vervoort	6–3, 6–4
Loss	12–11	Mar 2015	Israel F1, Herzliya	Futures	Hard	(France) Martin Vaïsse	(United States) Matthew Seeberger (United States) Cameron Silverman	2–6, 2–6
Loss	12–12	May 2015	France F9, Grasse	Futures	Clay	(France) Maxime Chazal	(Belgium) Julien Dubail (Russia) Daniil Medvedev	4–6, 4–6
Win	13–12	May 2015	Croatia F8, Bol	Futures	Clay	(France) Grégoire Barrère	(Croatia) Ivan Sabanov (Croatia) Matej Sabanov	4–6, 7–5, [10–6]
Win	14–12	May 2015	Russia F1, Moscow	Futures	Clay	(Estonia) Vladimir Ivanov	(Russia) Andrei Levine (Russia) Anton Zaitcev	3–6, 7–6^{(9–7)}, [10–7]
Loss	14–13	Jun 2015	Bosnia & Herzegovina F4, Kiseljak	Futures	Clay	(Australia) Steven de Waard	(Serbia) Danilo Petrović (Serbia) Ilija Vucic	0–6, 2–6
Loss	14–14	Mar 2016	Turkey F11, Antalya	Futures	Clay	(France) François-Arthur Vibert	(Bulgaria) Aleksandar Lazov (Czech Republic) Michal Schmid	4–6, 1–6
Loss	14–15	Apr 2016	Italy F6, Pula	Futures	Clay	(France) Yannick Jankovits	(Lithuania) Laurynas Grigelis (Italy) Francesco Moncagatto	3–6, 0–6
Loss	14–16	Jul 2018	France F12, Bourg-en-Bresse	Futures	Clay	(France) Alexis Musialek	(France) Dan Added (France) Ugo Humbert	6–2, 1–6, [5–10]
Loss	14–17	Aug 2018	Portugal F13, Caldas da Rainha	Futures	Clay	(France) Samuel Bensoussan	(Portugal) Tiago Cação (Portugal) Guilherme Osorio	3–6, 4–6
