= Andis Juška =

Latvian tennis player and coach (born 1985)

- Country (sports): Latvia
- Born: 22 May 1985 (age 40) Jūrmala, Latvia
- Plays: Right-handed (two-handed backhand)
- Prize money: US$177,277

Singles
- Career record: 19–19 (ATP Tour and Grand Slam main draws, and Davis Cup)
- Career titles: 0
- Highest ranking: No. 226 (26 October 2009)

Grand Slam singles results
- Australian Open: Q1 (2008)
- Wimbledon: Q1 (2007)
- US Open: Q2 (2007)

Doubles
- Career record: 5–8 (ATP Challenger Tour, ATP Tour and Grand Slam main draws, and Davis Cup)
- Career titles: 0
- Highest ranking: No. 136 (18 October 2010)
- Last updated on: 13 February 2012.

Andis Juška (born 22 May 1985) is a Latvian tennis coach and former player. Juška's career-high singles ranking was world No. 226, achieved in October 2009. For several years, he was the second-highest ATP-ranked Latvian tennis player.

He is currently the coach of American player Amanda Anisimova, and former coach of Ukrainian player Elina Svitolina. In addition, Andis has worked with Latvian tennis player Jeļena Ostapenko.

In addition to coaching individual players, in 2008, Juska was the captain of Latvian team for Billie Jean King Cup.

== Tennis career ==
=== Juniors ===
As a junior, Juška reached as high as no. 43 in the junior world singles rankings in 2002 (and no. 15 in doubles). He competed in the main draw of the Australian Open boys' singles event in both 2002 and 2003, also reaching the quarterfinals of the doubles event in the latter year.

=== Pro tour ===
Juška has won 17 events at the ITF Futures level. Juška has yet to play in an ATP World Tour or Grand Slam event main draw.

Legend (pre/post 2009)
ATP Challenger Series /
ATP Challenger Tour (3–3)

Outcome	No.	Date (Final)	Tournament	Surface	Partner	Opponents in the final	Score
Runner-up	6.	12 September 2010	Saint-Rémy-de-Provence, France	Hard	(Latvia) Deniss Pavlovs	(Luxembourg) Gilles Müller (France) Édouard Roger-Vasselin	0–6, 6–2, [11–13]
