= Jiří Krkoška =

Czech tennis player (born 1984)

- Country (sports): Czech Republic
- Born: 2 March 1984 (age 41)
- Plays: Right-handed (two-handed backhand)
- Prize money: $37,697

Singles
- Career record: 0–0
- Career titles: 0; 0 Challenger, 0 Futures
- Highest ranking: No. 758 (8 June 2009)

Doubles
- Career record: 0–0
- Career titles: 0; 1 Challenger, 10 Futures
- Highest ranking: No. 167 (22 March 2010)
- Last updated on: 8 October 2018.

Jiří Krkoška (born 2 March 1984) is a former Czech tennis player.

== Playing career ==
Krkoška has a career high ATP singles ranking of 758 achieved on 8 June 2009. He also has a career high doubles ranking of 167 achieved on 22 March 2010.

Krkoška has won 1 ATP Challenger singles title at the 2009 Trophée des Alpilles.

== Tour titles ==
Legend
Grand Slam (0)
ATP Masters Series (0)
ATP Tour (0)
Challengers (1)

=== Doubles ===
| Result | Date | Category | Tournament | Surface | Partner | Opponents | Score |
|---|---|---|---|---|---|---|---|
| Winner | 12 September 2009 | Challenger | Saint-Rémy-de-Provence, France | Hard | (Slovakia) Lukáš Lacko | (Belgium) Ruben Bemelmans (Belgium) Niels Desein | 6–1, 3–6, [10–3] |
