= Marc Gicquel =

French tennis player (born 1977)

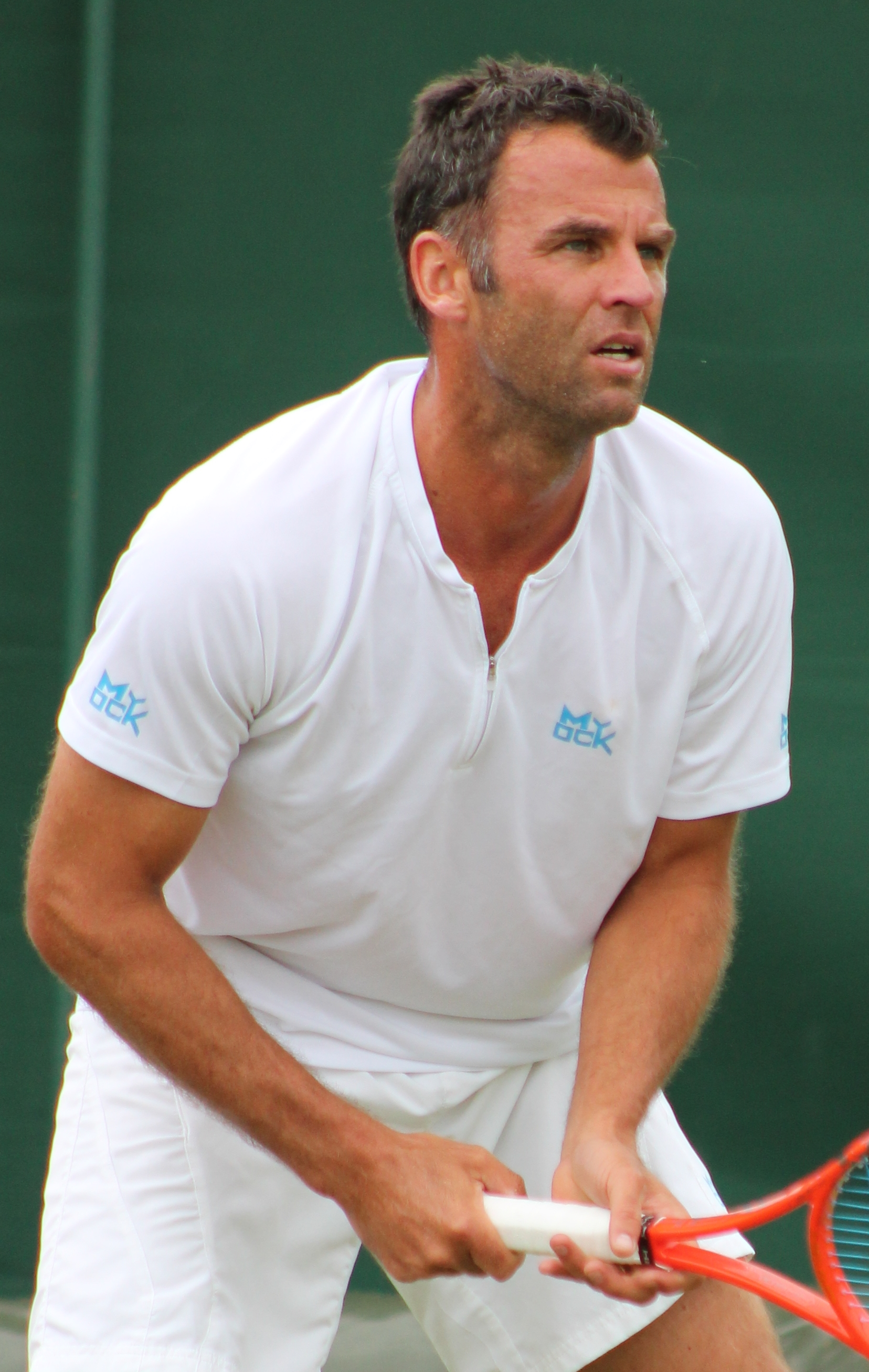
- Country (sports): France
- Residence: Boulogne-Billancourt, France
- Born: 30 March 1977 (age 49) Tunis, Tunisia
- Height: 1.88 m (6 ft 2 in)
- Turned pro: 1999
- Retired: 2014
- Plays: Right-handed (two-handed backhand)
- Prize money: $2,513,519

Singles
- Career record: 92–113 (at ATP Tour level, Grand Slam level, and in Davis Cup)
- Career titles: 0
- Highest ranking: No. 37 (8 September 2008)

Grand Slam singles results
- Australian Open: 3R (2008)
- French Open: 3R (2009)
- Wimbledon: 3R (2008)
- US Open: 4R (2006)

Doubles
- Career record: 49–55 (at ATP Tour level, Grand Slam level, and in Davis Cup)
- Career titles: 4
- Highest ranking: No. 38 (12 January 2009)

Grand Slam doubles results
- Australian Open: QF (2008)
- French Open: 2R (2005, 2010, 2012, 2013, 2014)
- Wimbledon: 2R (2007, 2009)
- US Open: 3R (2008)

Grand Slam mixed doubles results
- French Open: QF (2005)
Medal record
Summer Universiade
Bronze medal – third place	1999 Palma	Doubles
- Last updated on: 19 May 2021.

Marc Gicquel (French: [maʁk ʒikɛl]; born 30 March 1977) is a former professional male tennis player from France.

== Tennis career ==
Gicquel turned pro in 1999. He made his ATP Tour singles debut at the 2002 Open 13 tournament on hard courts in Marseilles, France. He was granted direct entry into the qualifying draw, which saw him defeat Johan Rousseaux 6–4, 6–4 and Cristiano Caratti 6–2, 7–6^{(10–8)} in the first two rounds prior to being defeated in the third and final round by Renzo Furlan 3–6, 3–6. He would however be gifted a lucky loser entry when sixth seeded Roger Federer withdrew from the tournament. He faced wild card compatriot Nicolas Mahut in the first round and bettered him by a score of 6–4, 6–3 before falling to another Frenchman and eventual runner-up Nicolas Escudé 1–6, 6–7^{(3–7)}.

Gicquel made his ATP Tour doubles main draw debut when he received a wild card entry into the 2005 French Open alongside compatriot Nicolas Devilder. They would optimize the opportunity they were given and defeated first round opponents Jordan Kerr and Sebastián Prieto 4–6, 7–5. 11–9 prior to bowing out with a second round loss to sixth seeds Leander Paes and Nenad Zimonjić 1–6, 3–6. He would also be given a wild card entry into the mixed doubles draw alongside Sandrine Testud, and they won their first two matches including a second round upset of the number 3 seeded Zimbabwean siblings Cara Black and Wayne Black 6–3, 2–6. 6–3 before falling in the quarterfinals to Paul Hanley and Samantha Stosur 4–6, 1–6.

On November 6, 2006, he broke into the top 50 after reaching his first ATP Tour final in Lyon, where he was defeated by Richard Gasquet. On April 30, 2007, Gicquel broke into the top 40 after reaching the semifinals of Casablanca. He reached a career high ATP singles ranking of World No. 37 achieved on 8 September 2008. He also reached a career high ATP doubles ranking of World No. 38 achieved on 12 January 2009.

He defeated second seed Tommy Robredo at the 2007 Grand Prix de Tennis de Lyon in the first round, and beat Alejandro Falla in the semifinals to reach the Lyon final for the second year running. Gicquel's run, however, was halted by another Frenchman, Sébastien Grosjean.

One of Gicquel's most famous matches was against Nicolas Kiefer at the French Open in 2006. Kiefer won the first two sets 6–0, 6–1, but Gicquel won the next two 7–5, 6–3. Kiefer eventually won the fifth set 11–9 after Gicquel had already saved multiple match points.

Gicquel reached 33 singles finals throughout his career, resulting in 20 wins and 13 losses which includes an 0–3 record in ATP Tour finals and a 9–2 record in ATP Challenger Tour finals. Additionally, he reached 22 career doubles finals resulting in 11 wins and 11 losses which includes a 4–3 record in ATP Tour finals and a 4–3 in ATP Challenger Tour finals.

== ATP Tour career finals ==
=== Singles: 3 (3 runner-ups) ===
Legend Grand Slam tournaments (0–0) ATP World Tour Finals (0–0) ATP World Tour Masters 1000 (0–0) ATP World Tour 500 Series (0–0) ATP World Tour 250 Series (0–3)	Titles by surface Hard (0–0) Clay (0–0) Grass (0–1) Carpet (0–2)	Titles by setting Outdoor (0–1) Indoor (0–2)

Result	W–L	Date	Tournament	Tier	Surface	Opponent	Score
Loss	0–1	Oct 2006	Grand Prix de Tennis de Lyon, France	International	Carpet (i)	(France) Richard Gasquet	3–6, 1–6
Loss	0–2	Oct 2007	Grand Prix de Tennis de Lyon, France	International	Carpet (i)	(France) Sébastien Grosjean	6–7^{(4–7)}, 4–6
Loss	0–3	Jun 2008	Rosmalen Championships, Netherlands	International	Grass	(Spain) David Ferrer	4–6, 2–6

=== Doubles: 7 (4 titles, 3 runner-ups) ===
Legend Grand Slam tournaments (0–0) ATP World Tour Finals (0–0) ATP World Tour Masters 1000 (0–0) ATP World Tour 500 Series (0–0) ATP World Tour 250 Series (4–3)	Titles by surface Hard (4–2) Clay (0–1) Grass (0–0)	Titles by setting Outdoor (3–2) Indoor (1–1)

Result	W–L	Date	Tournament	Tier	Surface	Partner	Opponents	Score
Loss	0–1	Jul 2007	Swiss Open, Switzerland	International	Clay	(France) Florent Serra	(Czech Republic) František Čermák (Czech Republic) Pavel Vízner	5–7, 7–5, [7–10]
Loss	0–2	Jan 2008	Chennai Open, India	International	Hard	(Cyprus) Marcos Baghdatis	(Thailand) Sanchai Ratiwatana (Thailand) Sonchat Ratiwatana	4–6, 5–7
Win	1–2	Aug 2008	Washington Open, US	International	Hard	(Sweden) Robert Lindstedt	(Brazil) Bruno Soares (Zimbabwe) Kevin Ullyett	7–6^{(8–6)}, 6–3
Win	2–2	Jan 2009	Brisbane International, Australia	250 Series	Hard	(France) Jo-Wilfried Tsonga	(Spain) Fernando Verdasco (Germany) Mischa Zverev	6–4, 6–3
Win	3–2	Jan 2010	Brisbane International, Australia (2)	250 Series	Hard	(France) Jérémy Chardy	(Czech Republic) Lukáš Dlouhý (India) Leander Paes	6–3, 7–6^{(7–5)}
Win	4–2	Feb 2013	Open Sud de France, France	250 Series	Hard (i)	(France) Michaël Llodra	(Sweden) Johan Brunström (South Africa) Raven Klaasen	6–3, 3–6, [11–9]
Loss	4–3	Feb 2014	Open Sud de France, France	250 Series	Hard (i)	(France) Nicolas Mahut	(Russia) Nikolay Davydenko (Uzbekistan) Denis Istomin	4–6, 6–1, [7–10]

== ATP Challenger and ITF Futures finals ==
=== Singles: 30 (20–10) ===
Legend ATP Challenger (9–2) ITF Futures (11–8)	Finals by surface Hard (12–3) Clay (7–7) Grass (0–0) Carpet (1–0)

Result	W–L	Date	Tournament	Tier	Surface	Opponent	Score
Loss	0–1	Apr 1999	France F5, Saint-Brieuc	Futures	Clay	(Belgium) Reginald Willems	4–6, 4–6
Loss	0–2	May 2001	Morocco F1, Rabat	Futures	Clay	(Morocco) Mehdi Tahiri	3–6, 6–3, 6–7^{(3–7)}
Loss	0–3	Sep 2001	Morocco F15, Bagnères-de-Bigorre	Futures	Hard	(France) Nicolas Mahut	3–6, 2–6
Loss	0–4	Jan 2002	France F3, Feucherolles	Futures	Clay	(Spain) Óscar Hernández	4–6, 6–2, 4–6
Win	1–4	Apr 2002	France F3, Feucherolles	Futures	Clay	(France) Olivier Patience	6–4, 7–6^{(7–5)}
Win	2–4	Oct 2002	France F21, La Roche-sur-Yon	Futures	Hard	(France) Nicolas Mahut	6–4, 5–7, 6–2
Win	3–4	Feb 2003	France F4, Feucherolles	Futures	Hard	(China) Zhu Benqiang	6–2, 6–4
Loss	3–5	Oct 2003	France F20, Saint-Dizier	Futures	Hard	(France) Thomas Dupré	7–5, 6–7^{(2–7)}, 4–6
Loss	3–6	Jan 2004	France F1, Deauville	Futures	Clay	(France) Jean-Christophe Faurel	5–7, 6–2, 6–7^{(5–7)}
Win	4–6	Feb 2004	France F2, Feucherolles	Futures	Hard	(France) Julien Jeanpierre	3–6, 6–2, 7–6^{(7–4)}
Win	5–6	Feb 2004	France F3, Bressuire	Futures	Hard	(France) Jérôme Haehnel	3–6, 6–3, 6–2
Loss	5–7	Apr 2004	France F6, Angers	Futures	Clay	(France) Nicolas Devilder	6–2, 3–6, 4–6
Loss	5–8	Apr 2004	France F7, Grasse	Futures	Clay	(France) Gilles Simon	4–6, 1–6
Win	6–8	Aug 2004	Timişoara, Romania	Challenger	Clay	(Austria) Oliver Marach	6–3, 6–1
Win	7–8	Jul 2005	France F11, Saint-Gervais	Futures	Clay	(France) Xavier Audouy	6–3, 6–1
Win	8–8	Oct 2005	Grenoble, France	Challenger	Hard	(Sweden) Thomas Enqvist	6–0, 6–2
Win	9–8	Apr 2006	Saint-Brieuc, France	Challenger	Clay	(Netherlands) Peter Wessels	6–3, 6–1
Loss	9–9	Jul 2006	Montauban, France	Challenger	Clay	(Algeria) Lamine Ouahab	5–7, 6–3, 6–7^{(2–7)}
Win	10–9	Feb 2008	Besançon, France	Challenger	Hard	(Austria) Alexander Peya	7–6^{(7–2)}, 6–4
Win	11–9	May 2009	Bordeaux, France	Challenger	Clay	(France) Mathieu Montcourt	3–6, 6–1, 6–4
Win	12–9	Oct 2010	Rennes, France	Challenger	Carpet	(Switzerland) Stéphane Bohli	7–6^{(8–6)}, 4–6, 6–1
Win	13–9	Mar 2011	France F4, Lille	Futures	Hard	(France) Jonathan Eysseric	6–3, 6–2
Win	14–9	Mar 2011	France F5, Poitiers	Futures	Hard	(France) Kenny de Schepper	7–6^{(7–4)}, 7–6^{(7–5)}
Win	15–9	May 2011	Bordeaux, France	Challenger	Clay	(Argentina) Horacio Zeballos	6–2, 6–4
Win	16–9	Apr 2012	France F8, Ajaccio	Futures	Clay	(France) Jonathan Dasnieres De Veigy	6–3, 6–4
Win	17–9	Sep 2012	France F16, Mulhouse	Futures	Hard	(France) Grégoire Burquier	6–4, 6–3
Win	18–9	Sep 2012	France F17, Plaisir	Futures	Hard	(Switzerland) Sandro Ehrat	6–2, 6–3
Win	19–9	Nov 2012	Geneva, Switzerland	Challenger	Hard	(Germany) Matthias Bachinger	3–6, 6–3, 6–4
Loss	19–10	Feb 2013	Quimper, France	Challenger	Hard	(Romania) Marius Copil	6–7^{(9–11)}, 4–6
Win	20–10	Sep 2013	St. Remy, France	Challenger	Hard	(Italy) Matteo Viola	6–4, 6–3

=== Doubles: 15 (7–8) ===
Legend ATP Challenger (4–3) ITF Futures (3–5)	Finals by surface Hard (4–3) Clay (3–5) Grass (0–0) Carpet (0–0)

Result	W–L	Date	Tournament	Tier	Surface	Partner	Opponents	Score
Loss	0–1	Apr 2001	France F8, Saint-Brieuc	Futures	Clay	(France) Régis Lavergne	(Argentina) Cristian Kordasz (Netherlands) Rogier Wassen	4–6, 6–7^{(8–10)}
Loss	0–2	Jun 2001	France F9, Noisy-le-Grand	Futures	Clay	(France) Anthony Maublanc	(France) Xavier Pujo (Morocco) Mehdi Tahiri	4–6, 3–6
Win	1–2	Feb 2003	France F4, Feucherolles	Futures	Hard	(France) Nicolas Mahut	(Switzerland) Matthieu Amgwerd (Brazil) Josh Goffi	7–5, 6–4
Win	2–2	Oct 2003	France F21, La Roche-sur-Yon	Futures	Hard	(France) Jean-Baptiste Perlant	(France) Laurent Recouderc (France) Édouard Roger-Vasselin	6–2, 6–0
Win	3–2	Jan 2004	France F1, Deauville	Futures	Clay	(France) Jean-Baptiste Perlant	(Greece) Elefterios Alexiou (Greece) Alexandros Jakupovic	6–1, 1–6, 6–3
Loss	3–3	Mar 2004	France F4, Lille	Futures	Hard	(France) Édouard Roger-Vasselin	(France) Jean-François Bachelot (France) Jean-Michel Pequery	6–7^{(4–7)}, 3–6
Win	4–3	Jul 2005	Tampere, Finland	Challenger	Clay	(France) Édouard Roger-Vasselin	(Poland) Adam Chadaj (Poland) Filip Urban	6–4, 4–6, 6–1
Loss	4–4	Jul 2006	Montauban, France	Challenger	Clay	(France) Édouard Roger-Vasselin	(Uruguay) Pablo Cuevas (Chile) Adrián García	3–6, 6–4, [8–10]
Loss	4–5	Jul 2006	Scheveningen, Netherlands	Challenger	Clay	(France) Édouard Roger-Vasselin	(Spain) Guillermo García López (Spain) Salvador Navarro-Gutiérrez	4–6, 6–0, [9–11]
Win	5–5	Feb 2011	Courmayeur, Italy	Challenger	Hard	(France) Nicolas Mahut	(France) Olivier Charroin (France) Alexandre Renard	6–3, 6–4
Loss	5–6	Mar 2011	France F4, Lille	Futures	Hard	(France) Nicolas Renavand	(France) Kenny de Schepper (France) Alexandre Penaud	3–6, 6–2, [8–10]
Loss	5–7	Apr 2012	France F7, Angers	Futures	Clay	(France) Nicolas Renavand	(Romania) Florin Mergea (Romania) Andrei Dăescu	2–6, 6–3, [7–10]
Loss	5–8	Sep 2013	St. Remy, France	Challenger	Hard	(France) Josselin Ouanna	(France) Pierre-Hugues Herbert (France) Albano Olivetti	3–6, 7–6^{(7–5)}, [13–15]
Win	6–8	May 2014	Bordeaux, France	Challenger	Clay	(Ukraine) Sergiy Stakhovsky	(United States) Ryan Harrison (United States) Alex Kuznetsov	walkover
Win	7–8	Oct 2014	Mons, Belgium	Challenger	Hard	(France) Nicolas Mahut	(Germany) Andre Begemann (Austria) Julian Knowle	6–3, 6–4

== Performance timelines ==
Key
W	F	SF	QF	#R	RR	Q#	DNQ	A	NH

(W) winner; (F) finalist; (SF) semifinalist; (QF) quarterfinalist; (#R) rounds 4, 3, 2, 1; (RR) round-robin stage; (Q#) qualification round; (DNQ) did not qualify; (A) absent; (NH) not held; (SR) strike rate (events won / competed); (W–L) win–loss record.

=== Singles ===
Tournament	2002	2003	2004	2005	2006	2007	2008	2009	2010	2011	2012	2013	2014	SR	W–L	Win %
Australian Open	A	Q1	A	Q2	Q3	2R	3R	1R	2R	Q1	A	Q2	Q1	0 / 4	4–4	50%
French Open	Q1	Q1	1R	Q3	2R	1R	2R	3R	1R	1R	Q3	1R	Q2	0 / 8	4–8	33%
Wimbledon	Q2	A	A	Q1	A	1R	3R	2R	1R	1R	Q3	1R	Q3	0 / 6	3–6	33%
US Open	A	A	Q3	Q1	4R	1R	1R	2R	1R	1R	Q2	Q2	Q1	0 / 6	4–6	40%
Win–loss	0–0	0–0	0–1	0–0	4–2	1–4	5–4	4–4	1–4	0–3	0–0	0–2	0–0	0 / 24	15–24	38%
ATP Tour Masters 1000
Indian Wells Masters	A	A	A	A	A	1R	2R	2R	A	A	A	A	A	0 / 3	2–3	40%
Miami Open	A	A	A	A	A	1R	1R	1R	1R	A	A	1R	A	0 / 5	0–5	0%
Monte-Carlo Masters	A	A	A	A	Q1	2R	1R	2R	A	A	A	A	A	0 / 3	2–3	40%
Madrid Open	A	A	A	A	A	1R	A	A	A	A	A	A	A	0 / 1	0–1	0%
Italian Open	A	A	A	A	A	1R	A	A	A	A	A	A	A	0 / 1	0–1	0%
Hamburg	A	A	A	A	A	1R	A	Not Masters Series						0 / 1	0–1	0%
Cincinnati Masters	A	A	A	A	1R	1R	A	A	A	A	A	A	A	0 / 2	0–2	0%
Paris Masters	A	A	Q1	Q2	1R	A	1R	Q2	Q2	Q1	A	Q1	A	0 / 2	0–2	0%
Win–loss	0–0	0–0	0–0	0–0	0–2	1–7	1–4	2–3	0–1	0–0	0–0	0–1	0–0	0 / 18	4–18	18%

=== Doubles ===
Tournament	2005	2006	2007	2008	2009	2010	2011	2012	2013	2014	SR	W–L	Win %
Australian Open	A	1R	2R	QF	1R	1R	A	A	A	1R	0 / 6	4–6	40%
French Open	2R	1R	1R	1R	1R	2R	1R	2R	2R	2R	0 / 10	5–10	33%
Wimbledon	A	A	2R	1R	2R	A	A	A	A	A	0 / 3	2–3	40%
US Open	A	A	1R	3R	2R	1R	1R	A	A	A	0 / 5	3–5	38%
Win–loss	1–1	0–2	2–4	5–4	2–4	1–3	0–2	1–1	1–1	1–2	0 / 24	14–24	37%

=== Mixed doubles ===
Tournament	2005	2006	2007	2008	2009	2010	2011	2012	2013	SR	W–L	Win %
Australian Open	A	A	A	A	A	A	A	A	A	0 / 0	0–0	–
French Open	QF	2R	2R	A	2R	1R	A	2R	1R	0 / 7	6–7	46%
Wimbledon	A	A	A	A	A	A	A	A	A	0 / 0	0–0	–
US Open	A	A	A	A	A	A	A	A	A	0 / 0	0–0	–
Win–loss	2–1	1–1	1–1	0–0	1–1	0–1	0–0	1–1	0–1	0 / 7	6–7	46%

== Trivia ==
In a match during the 2007 Halle, Germany tournament, Gicquel was struck directly in the crotch by a 129 mph Benjamin Becker serve. He went on to beat Becker, but spent most of the night vomiting and in pain due to swelling and was forced to retire in his next match versus Jarkko Nieminen.
