= Trophée des Alpilles =

- 2016 Trophée des Alpilles

Defunct tennis tournament
- Event name: St. Remy
- Location: Saint-Rémy-de-Provence, France
- Venue: Tennis Club de Saint-Rémy-de-Provence
- Category: ATP Challenger Tour
- Surface: Hard
- Draw: 32S/32Q/16D
- Prize money: €42,500
- Website: Website

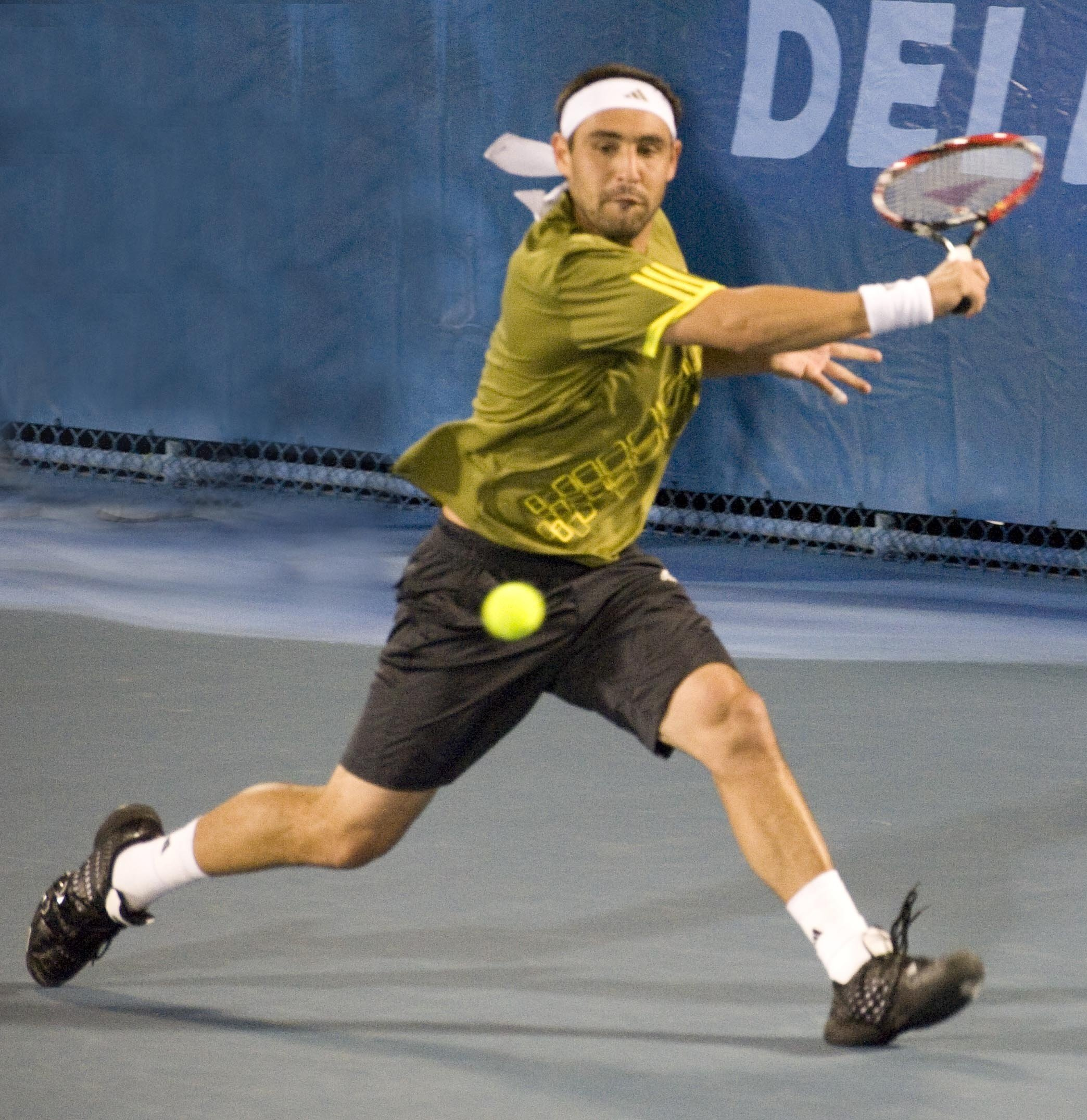
2006 Australian Open runner-up Marcos Baghdatis was the men's singles champion in 2009.

The Trophée des Alpilles was a professional tennis tournament played on outdoor hardcourts. It was part of the ATP Challenger Tour. It was held annually at the Tennis Club de Saint-Rémy-de-Provence in Saint-Rémy-de-Provence, France, from 2009 until 2016.

== History ==
The creation of an ATP Challenger Tour event in the Provence region had been envisioned for several years by several tennis tournaments organisers, as well as former World No. 4, Marseille-born Sébastien Grosjean, before the project came to life during 2008 and 2009 when the Saint-Rémy-de-Provence organisers, sponsored by Grosjean, met with the Association of Tennis Professionals (ATP) to discuss the introduction of such an event in the calendar.

The €42,500 tournament was set in the time slot of the second week of the US Open in September, to allow players eliminated in the qualifications or in the early rounds to compete in Saint-Rémy-de-Provence. As a follow-up to the US Open, the event uses the same tennis balls, and outdoor hard courts similar to the ones of the American Grand Slam. For the 2009 inaugural edition, the line up, attracted with the help of Grosjean, included Top 100 players Björn Phau and Adrian Mannarino or former Wimbledon semifinalists Marcos Baghdatis and Xavier Malisse, who both reached the singles final, in which Baghdatis eventually won his second title on the 2009 ATP Challenger Tour.

== Past finals ==
=== Singles ===
Year	Champion	Runner-up	Score
2016	(Russia) Daniil Medvedev	(Belgium) Joris De Loore	6–3, 6–3
2015	(Croatia) Ivan Dodig	(Germany) Nils Langer	6–3, 6–2
2014	(France) Nicolas Mahut	(France) Vincent Millot	6–7^{(3–7)}, 6–4, 6–3
2013	(France) Marc Gicquel	(Italy) Matteo Viola	6–4, 6–3
2012	(France) Josselin Ouanna	(Italy) Flavio Cipolla	6–4, 7–5
2011	(France) Édouard Roger-Vasselin	(France) Arnaud Clément	6–4, 6–3
2010	(Poland) Jerzy Janowicz	(France) Édouard Roger-Vasselin	3–6, 7–6^{(10–8)}, 7–6^{(8–6)}
2009	(Cyprus) Marcos Baghdatis	(Belgium) Xavier Malisse	6–4, 6–1

=== Doubles ===
Year	Champions	Runners-up	Score
2016	(United Kingdom) Ken Skupski (United Kingdom) Neal Skupski	(Republic of Ireland) David O'Hare (United Kingdom) Joe Salisbury	6–7^{(5–7)}, 6–4, [10–5]
2015	(United Kingdom) Ken Skupski (United Kingdom) Neal Skupski	(Slovakia) Andrej Martin (Slovakia) Igor Zelenay	6–4, 6–1
2014	(France) Pierre-Hugues Herbert (Russia) Konstantin Kravchuk	(France) David Guez (France) Martin Vaïsse	6–1, 7–6^{(7–3)}
2013	(France) Pierre-Hugues Herbert (France) Albano Olivetti	(France) Marc Gicquel (France) Josselin Ouanna	6–3, 6–7^{(5–7)}, [15–13]
2012	(Lithuania) Laurynas Grigelis (Belarus) Uladzimir Ignatik	(Spain) Jordi Marsé-Vidri (Spain) Carles Poch Gradin	6–7^{(4–7)}, 6–3, [10–6]
2011	(France) Pierre-Hugues Herbert (France) Édouard Roger-Vasselin	(France) Arnaud Clément (France) Nicolas Renavand	6–0, 4–6, [10–7]
2010	(Luxembourg) Gilles Müller (France) Édouard Roger-Vasselin	(Latvia) Andis Juška (Latvia) Deniss Pavlovs	6–0, 2–6, [13–11]
2009	(Czech Republic) Jiří Krkoška (Slovakia) Lukáš Lacko	(Belgium) Ruben Bemelmans (Belgium) Niels Desein	6–1, 3–6, [10–3]
