= Josselin Ouanna =

French tennis player

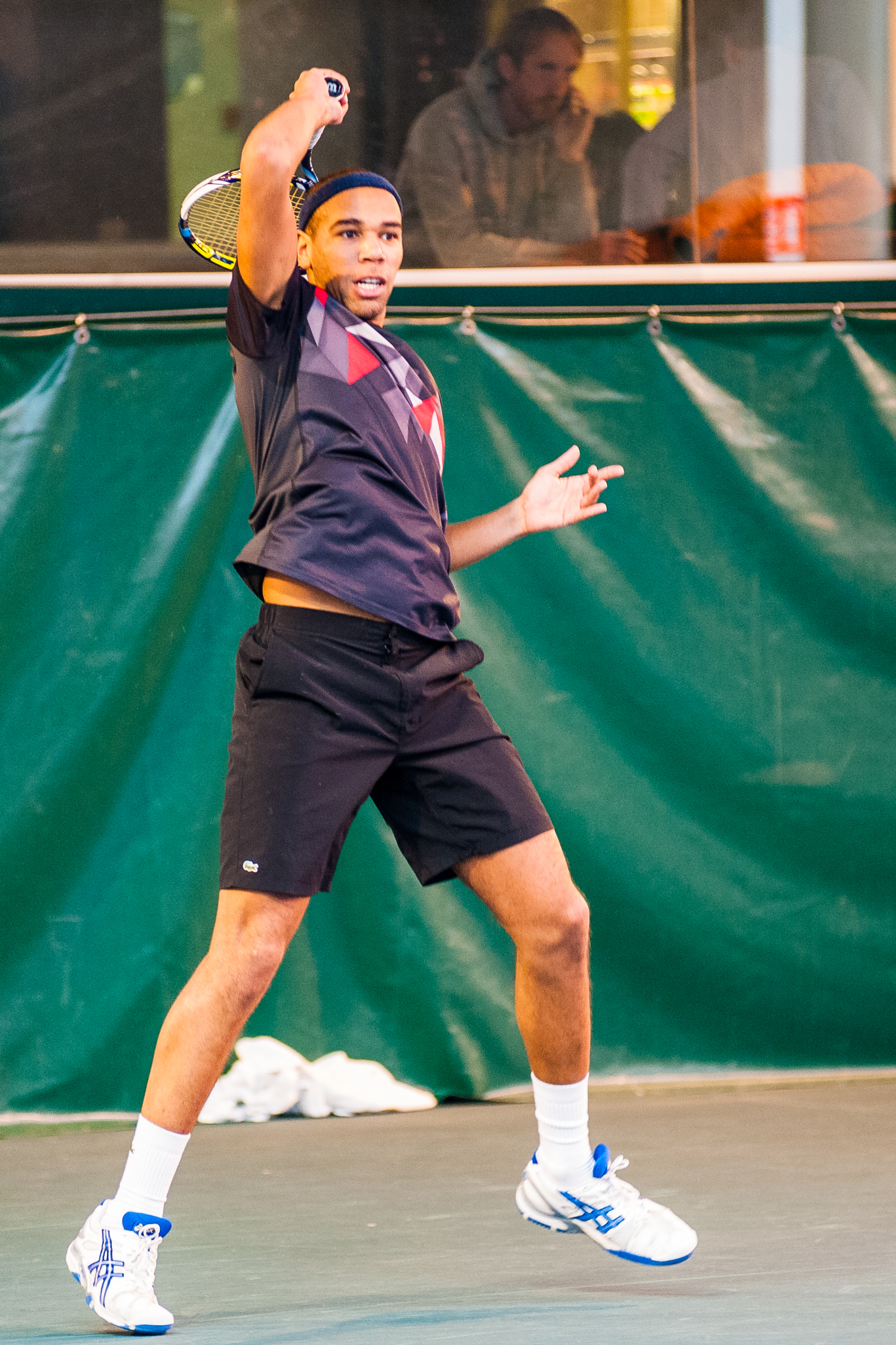
- Country (sports): France
- Residence: Suresnes, France
- Born: 14 April 1986 (age 39); Tours, France
- Height: 1.93 m (6 ft 4 in)
- Turned pro: 2004
- Retired: 2015
- Plays: Right-handed (one-handed backhand)
- Coach: Jérôme Potier
- Prize money: $723,143

Singles
- Career record: 9–17 (at ATP Tour level, Grand Slam level, and in Davis Cup)
- Career titles: 0
- Highest ranking: No. 88 (5 October 2009)

Grand Slam singles results
- Australian Open: 1R (2013)
- French Open: 3R (2009)
- Wimbledon: Q2 (2010)
- US Open: 2R (2009)

Doubles
- Career record: 6–14 (at ATP Tour level, Grand Slam level, and in Davis Cup)
- Career titles: 0
- Highest ranking: No. 220 (7 January 2008)

Grand Slam doubles results
- French Open: 1R (2014)

Josselin Ouanna (French: [ʒɔs(ə)lɛ̃ wana]; born 14 April 1986) is a retired French tennis player.

== Biography ==
Born in Tours and Guadeloupean origin, he was quickly spotted and integrates INSEP with her friends of "blackteam" Gaël Monfils (of Guadeloupe and also Martinique Caribbean origin) and Jo-Wilfried Tsonga (of Congolese origin). He was coached by Jérôme Potier of CNE Roland Garros. Several injuries have slowed his progress between 2005 and 2007.

After a blank year in 2015, he announced his retirement from professional tennis.

== Career ==
In 2004, Ouanna was the runner-up in the Australian Open Boys' Singles. He was defeated by his doubles partner and compatriot Frenchman Gaël Monfils handily. Soon afterwards, he took part his first Challenger tournament in Cherbourg and reached the quarterfinals. In September of the same year, he won his first ITF professional tournament, a Futures F13 in Bagnères-de-Bigorre, France.

In 2007, he reached the quarterfinals at Tunica and Freudenstadt tournaments. He won two Futures tournaments in France in this year.

In 2008, he reached the quarterfinals of four Challenger tournaments early in the season. He played his first Roland Garros as a lucky loser, but lost to Argentina's Juan Martín del Potro in straight sets in the first round. He then lost twice in the quarterfinals of French Challenger tournaments, before winning the Rennes Challenger tournament against Adrian Mannarino. Josselin Ouanna made himself known at the Lyon tournament, where he defeated World #46 Ivan Ljubičić, then Nicolás Lapentti before losing to Gilles Simon. This performance qualifies him for the first Masters France. However, he was eliminated in the pool stage against Julien Benneteau, Gilles Simon and Marc Gicquel.

In April 2009, he won the Challenger tournament in Saint-Brieuc against Adrian Mannarino in three sets.

Ouanna was awarded a wild card for the 2009 French Open, granting him a second Grand Slam appearance. He went through the first round by eliminating the Spaniard Marcel Granollers in five sets. In the second round, he beat one of his childhood heroes, 20th seed and former World #1 Marat Safin, who was playing his last French Open, in five sets. This victory, his first against a Top 30, made him known to the public. Ouanna then lost in the third round to Fernando González in three sets.

At the 2009 US Open, he lost to González once again, this time in the second round. After the tournament, he entered the Top 100 for the first time.

At the 2010 French Open, he beat Łukasz Kubot in the first round before losing to Jo-Wilfried Tsonga in the second round.

In 2012, he won the Challenger tournaments of Cherbourg and Saint-Rémy-de-Provence and climbed back up 256 places in the ATP rankings throughout the year, reaching 120th place at the end of the year.

After Nicolas Mahut forfeited his spot for the tournament, Ouanna retrieved a wildcard to take part to the 2013 Australian Open. He lost to Alejandro Falla in the first round, in straight sets.

== ATP Challenger and ITF Futures finals ==
=== Singles: 19 (9–10) ===
Legend (singles) ATP Challenger Tour (4–1) ITF Futures Tour (5–9)	Titles by surface Hard (6–6) Clay (1–4) Grass (0–0) Carpet (2–0)

Result	W–L	Date	Tournament	Tier	Surface	Opponent	Score
Loss	0–1	May 2003	Miramar, Portugal 1	Satellites	Clay	(Czech Republic) Jan Minar	3–6, 7–5, 2–6
Loss	0–2	May 2003	Espinho, Portugal 1	Satellites	Clay	(Finland) Timo Nieminen	3–6, 2–6
Loss	0–3	Jul 2004	Bourg-en-Bresse, France F10	Futures	Clay	(France) Bertrand Contzler	5–7, 1–6
Loss	0–4	Aug 2004	Szczecin, Poland F5	Futures	Clay	(Spain) Javier García-Sintes	2–6, 2–6
Win	1–4	Sep 2004	Bagnères-de-Bigorre, France F13	Futures	Hard	(France) Rodolphe Cadart	7–5, 7–6^{(7–4)}
Loss	1–5	Oct 2004	Forbach, France F16	Futures	Hard	(Republic of Ireland) Kevin Sorensen	3–6, 4–6
Win	2–5	Sep 2007	Forbach, France F15	Futures	Carpet	(Jamaica) Dustin Brown	7–5, 7–6^{(7–4)}
Win	3–5	Oct 2007	Saint-Dizier, France F17	Futures	Hard	(Czech Republic) Pavel Šnobel	6–3, 7–6^{(7–4)}
Win	4–5	Oct 2008	Rennes, France	Challenger	Carpet	(France) Adrian Mannarino	6–2, 6–3
Win	5–5	Apr 2009	Saint-Brieuc, France	Challenger	Clay	(France) Adrian Mannarino	7–5, 1–6, 6–4
Loss	5–6	Aug 2011	Piombino, Italy F24	Futures	Hard	(Italy) Luca Vanni	3–6, 2–6
Loss	5–7	Sep 2011	Mulhouse, France F14	Futures	Hard	(France) Pierre-Hugues Herbert	4–6, 4–6
Win	6–7	Mar 2012	Cherbourg, France	Challenger	Hard	(France) Maxime Teixeira	6–3, 6–2
Win	7–7	Mar 2012	Poitiers, France F13	Futures	Hard	(France) Kenny de Schepper	7–6^{(7–2)}, 7–6^{(7–2)}
Loss	7–8	Jul 2012	Wuhan, China	Challenger	Hard	(Slovenia) Aljaž Bedene	3–6, 6–4, 3–6
Win	8–8	Sep 2012	Saint-Rémy-de-Provence, France	Challenger	Hard	(Italy) Flavio Cipolla	6–4, 7–5
Win	9–8	Jan 2014	Bressuire, France F2	Futures	Hard	(France) Grégoire Burquier	7–6^{(7–4)}, 1–6, 6–4
Loss	9–9	Feb 2014	Feucherolles, France F3	Futures	Hard	(Belgium) Maxime Authom	6–7^{(5–7)}, 5–7
Loss	9–10	Sep 2014	Plaisir, France F19	Futures	Hard	(Belgium) Niels Desein	1–6, 6–7^{(4–7)}

=== Doubles: 13 (7–6) ===
Legend (singles) ATP Challenger Tour (1–1) ITF Futures Tour (6–5)	Titles by surface Hard (5–4) Clay (2–2) Grass (0–0) Carpet (0–0)

Result	W–L	Date	Tournament	Tier	Surface	Partner	Opponents	Score
Win	1–0	Aug 2003	Našice, Croatia F3	Futures	Clay	(Germany) Andreas Beck	(Croatia) Ivan Cerović (Croatia) Albert Loncaric	6–4, 7–5
Loss	1–1	Nov 2003	Gran Canaria, Spain F27	Futures	Clay	(France) Gaël Monfils	(Spain) Emilio Benfele Álvarez (Spain) Germán Puentes-Alcani	3–6, 4–6
Loss	1–2	Apr 2004	Grasse, France F7	Futures	Clay	(France) Gaël Monfils	(France) Gilles Simon (France) Jo-Wilfried Tsonga	5–7, 2–6
Loss	1–3	Sep 2004	Mulhouse, France F14	Futures	Hard	(France) Alexandre Sidorenko	(United Kingdom) Jonathan Marray (United Kingdom) David Sherwood	2–6, 1–6
Win	2–3	Jan 2005	Feucherolles, France F2	Futures	Hard	(France) Jean-Michel Pequery	(France) Patrice Atias (France) Jonathan Hilaire	7–6^{(7–1)}, 6–3
Win	3–3	Feb 2007	Feucherolles, France F2	Futures	Hard	(France) Adrian Mannarino	(France) Ludwig Pellerin (France) Édouard Roger-Vasselin	6–4, 7–5
Win	4–3	Feb 2007	Bressuire, France F3	Futures	Hard	(France) Adrian Mannarino	(Pakistan) Aisam Qureshi (France) Alexandre Renard	6–7^{(5–7)}, 6–3, 7–5
Win	5–3	Jun 2007	Blois, France F8	Futures	Clay	(France) Adrian Mannarino	(Spain) David Marrero Santana (Spain) Daniel Muñoz de la Nava	6–2, 6–1
Win	6–3	Oct 2007	Nevers, France F16	Futures	Hard	(France) Jérôme Inzerillo	(Australia) Raphael Durek (Poland) Dawid Olejniczak	1–6, 7–6^{(7–4)}, [12–10]
Loss	6–4	Mar 2008	Poitiers, France F5	Futures	Hard	(France) Jérôme Inzerillo	(Belgium) Ruben Bemelmans (Belgium) Stefan Wauters	5–7, 4–6
Loss	6–5	Sep 2013	Saint-Rémy-de-Provence, France	Challenger	Hard	(France) Marc Gicquel	(France) Pierre-Hugues Herbert (France) Albano Olivetti	3–6, 7–6^{(7–5)}, [13–15]
Win	7–5	Jun 2014	Tianjin, China	Challenger	Hard	(Germany) Robin Kern	(United States) Jason Jung (United States) Evan King	6–7^{(3–7)}, 7–5, [10–8]
Loss	7–6	Dec 2014	Lome, Togo F2	Futures	Hard	(Togo) Komlavi Loglo	(Republic of Ireland) DavidO'Hare (United Kingdom) Joe Salisbury	6–7^{(5–7)}, 4–6

== Singles performance timeline ==
Key
W	F	SF	QF	#R	RR	Q#	DNQ	A	NH

(W) winner; (F) finalist; (SF) semifinalist; (QF) quarterfinalist; (#R) rounds 4, 3, 2, 1; (RR) round-robin stage; (Q#) qualification round; (DNQ) did not qualify; (A) absent; (NH) not held; (SR) strike rate (events won / competed); (W–L) win–loss record.

Tournament	2005	2006	2007	2008	2009	2010	2011	2012	2013	SR	W–L	Win %
Australian Open	A	A	A	Q3	Q2	Q2	Q3	A	1R	0 / 1	0–1	0%
French Open	Q1	Q1	Q1	1R	3R	2R	Q1	Q3	Q1	0 / 3	3–3	50%
Wimbledon	A	A	A	Q1	A	Q2	Q1	Q1	Q2	0 / 0	0–0	–
US Open	A	A	A	Q1	2R	Q2	A	Q3	Q1	0 / 1	1–1	50%
Win–loss	0–0	0–0	0–0	0–1	3–2	1–1	0–0	0–0	0–1	0 / 5	4–5	44%

== Junior Grand Slam finals ==
=== Boys' singles: 1 (1 runner-up) ===
Result	Year	Tournament	Surface	Opponent	Score
Loss	2004	Australian Open	Hard	(France) Gaël Monfils	0–6, 3–6
