= Martin Vaïsse =

French tennis player

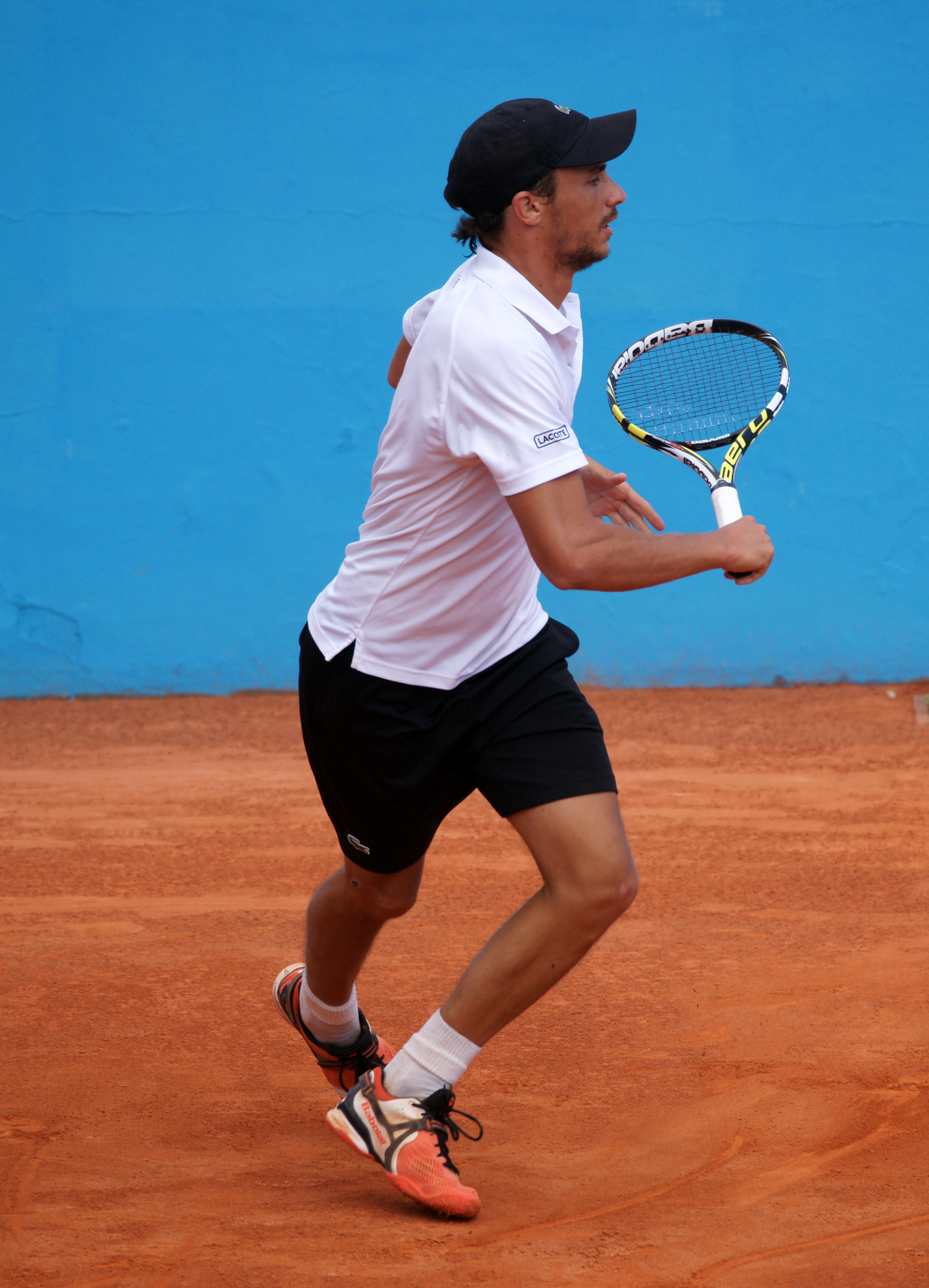
- Vaïsse at the 2014 Open de Nice Côte d'Azur
- Full name: Martin Vaïsse
- Country (sports): France
- Born: 11 August 1987 (age 38)
- Plays: Right-handed (two handed-backhand)
- Prize money: $54,450

Singles
- Career record: 0–1 (at ATP Tour level, Grand Slam level, and in Davis Cup)
- Career titles: 6 ITF
- Highest ranking: No. 225 (22 September 2014)

Grand Slam singles results
- US Open: Q1 (2014)

Doubles
- Career record: 0–1 (at ATP Tour level, Grand Slam level, and in Davis Cup)
- Career titles: 1 ITF
- Highest ranking: No. 453 (13 October 2014)

Martin Vaïsse (born 11 August 1987) is a retired French tennis player. Vaisse has a career high ATP singles ranking of 225, achieved on 22 September 2014. Vaïsse made his ATP main draw doubles debut at the 2013 Open 13 where he partnered Maxime Chazal but lost in the first round. At the 2014 Open de Nice Côte d'Azur, Vaïsse qualified for the main draw defeating Ante Pavić, Albert Ramos and Sam Querrey before losing in the first round to compatriot Nicolas Mahut.
