= 2017 Open d'Orléans – Doubles =

Tennis tournament in France

Doubles
- 2017 Open d'Orléans

Final
- Champions: (Argentina) Guillermo Durán (Argentina) Andrés Molteni
- Runners-up: (France) Jonathan Eysseric (France) Tristan Lamasine
- Score: 6–3, 6–7^{(4–7)}, [13–11]

Events
Singles	Doubles
← 2016 ·	Open d'Orléans	· 2018 →

Nikola Mektić and Franko Škugor were the defending champions but chose not to defend their title.

Guillermo Durán and Andrés Molteni won the title after defeating Jonathan Eysseric and Tristan Lamasine 6–3, 6–7^{(4–7)}, [13–11] in the final.

== Seeds ==
1. (Argentina) Guillermo Durán / (Argentina) Andrés Molteni (champions)
2. (United Kingdom) Ken Skupski / (United Kingdom) Neal Skupski (semifinals)
3. (Netherlands) Sander Arends / (Croatia) Antonio Šančić (first round)
4. (Monaco) Romain Arneodo / (France) Hugo Nys (quarterfinals)

== Draw ==
=== Key ===
- Q = Qualifier
- WC = Wild card
- LL = Lucky loser
- Alt = Alternate
- ITF = ITF entry
- PR = Protected ranking
- SR = Special ranking
- SE = Special exempt
- JE = Junior exempt
- JR = Junior Accelerator Programme entrant
- CO = College Accelerator Programme entrant
- NG = Next Gen Accelerator Program entrant
- w/o = Walkover
- r = Retired
- d = Defaulted

First round
1	(Argentina) G Durán (Argentina) A Molteni	6	6
WC	(France) Thomas Bréchemier (Togo) J-K Loglo	1	2
WC	(France) B Bonzi (France) F Reboul	6	1	[10]
(France) A Hoang (France) G Jacq	2	6	[6]
3	(Netherlands) S Arends (Croatia) A Šančić	3	2
(Lithuania) R Berankis (Russia) A Kuznetsov	6	6
(Slovakia) N Gombos (Bosnia and Herzegovina) A Šetkić	0	7^{8}	[3]
(Sweden) J Brunström (Slovakia) I Zelenay	6	6^{6}	[10]
(France) J Eysseric (France) T Lamasine	4	6	[10]
(Kazakhstan) M Kukushkin (Ukraine) D Molchanov	6	3	[2]
WC	(France) G Blancaneaux (France) Mick Lescure	4	4
4	(Monaco) R Arneodo (France) H Nys	6	6
(Germany) D Brown (Hungary) M Fucsovics	1	1
(Philippines) R Gonzales (United States) H Reese	6	6
PR	(France) K de Schepper (Netherlands) I Sijsling	4	7^{7}	[8]
2	(United Kingdom) K Skupski (United Kingdom) N Skupski	6	6^{3}	[10]

Quarterfinals
1	(Argentina) G Durán (Argentina) A Molteni	w/o
WC	(France) B Bonzi (France) F Reboul
(Lithuania) R Berankis (Russia) A Kuznetsov	6	5	[10]
(Sweden) J Brunström (Slovakia) I Zelenay	2	7	[4]
(France) J Eysseric (France) T Lamasine	6	6
4	(Monaco) R Arneodo (France) H Nys	3	2
(Philippines) R Gonzales (United States) H Reese	6	4	[2]
2	(United Kingdom) K Skupski (United Kingdom) N Skupski	3	6	[10]

Semifinals
1	(Argentina) G Durán (Argentina) A Molteni	6	6^{4}	[13]
(Lithuania) R Berankis (Russia) A Kuznetsov	3	7^{7}	[11]
(France) J Eysseric (France) T Lamasine	6	3	[12]
2	(United Kingdom) K Skupski (United Kingdom) N Skupski	4	6	[10]

Final
1	(Argentina) G Durán (Argentina) A Molteni	6	6^{4}	[13]
(France) J Eysseric (France) T Lamasine	3	7^{7}	[11]
