= 2019 Open d'Orléans – Singles =

Tennis tournament in France

Singles
- 2019 Open d'Orléans

Final
- Champion: (Sweden) Mikael Ymer
- Runner-up: (France) Grégoire Barrère
- Score: 6–3, 7–5

Events
| Singles | Doubles |
| ← 2018 · | Open d'Orléans | · 2021 → |

Aljaž Bedene was the defending champion but lost in the quarterfinals to Mikael Ymer.

Ymer won the title after defeating Grégoire Barrère 6–3, 7–5 in the final.

== Seeds ==
All seeds receive a bye into the second round.

1. (France) Jo-Wilfried Tsonga (semifinals)
2. (France) Ugo Humbert (second round)
3. (Slovenia) Aljaž Bedene (quarterfinals)
4. (Italy) Stefano Travaglia (second round)
5. (Romania) Marius Copil (second round)
6. (France) Corentin Moutet (third round)
7. (France) Grégoire Barrère (final)
8. (Sweden) Mikael Ymer (champion)
9. (France) Antoine Hoang (quarterfinals)
10. (Tunisia) Malek Jaziri (third round)
11. (Slovakia) Norbert Gombos (third round)
12. (Russia) Evgeny Donskoy (third round)
13. (Austria) Dennis Novak (second round)
14. (Latvia) Ernests Gulbis (second round)
15. (Italy) Jannik Sinner (third round)
16. (Germany) Yannick Maden (third round)

== Draw ==
=== Key ===
- Q = Qualifier
- WC = Wild card
- LL = Lucky loser
- Alt = Alternate
- ITF = ITF entry
- PR = Protected ranking
- SR = Special ranking
- SE = Special exempt
- JE = Junior exempt
- JR = Junior Accelerator Programme entrant
- CO = College Accelerator Programme entrant
- NG = Next Gen Accelerator Program entrant
- w/o = Walkover
- r = Retired
- d = Defaulted

=== Finals ===
Quarterfinals
1 | (France) Jo-Wilfried Tsonga | 6 | 6^{5} | 6
9 | (France) Antoine Hoang | 2 | 7^{7} | 3
3 | (Slovenia) Aljaž Bedene | 6^{2} | 4
8/WC | (Sweden) Mikael Ymer | 7^{7} | 6
7 | (France) Grégoire Barrère | 4 | 7^{9} | 6
(France) Maxime Janvier | 6 | 6^{7} | 2
(France) Tristan Lamasine | 7^{8} | 6
(Ukraine) Sergiy Stakhovsky | 6^{6} | 4

Semifinals
1 | (France) Jo-Wilfried Tsonga | 6^{2} | 4
8/WC | (Sweden) Mikael Ymer | 7^{7} | 6
7 | (France) Grégoire Barrère | 6 | 6
(France) Tristan Lamasine | 4 | 3

Final
8/WC | (Sweden) Mikael Ymer | 6 | 7
7 | (France) Grégoire Barrère | 3 | 5

=== Top half ===
==== Section 1 ====
First round
(Czech Republic) L Rosol | 2 | 6^{3}
(Belgium) S Darcis | 6 | 7^{7}
Q | (Monaco) H Nys | 6 | 6
(Spain) A Menéndez Maceiras | 1 | 4
WC | (France) G Blancaneaux | 5 | 4
WC | (Italy) L Vanni | 7 | 6
(France) M Bourgue | 6 | 6
(Italy) R Marcora | 2 | 3

Second round
1 | (France) J-W Tsonga | 6 | 6
(Belgium) S Darcis | 3 | 4
Q | (Monaco) H Nys | 6 | 6
14 | (Latvia) E Gulbis | 4 | 2
9 | (France) A Hoang | 6 | 6
WC | (Italy) L Vanni | 2 | 3
(France) M Bourgue | 5 | 6^{4}
6 | (France) C Moutet | 7 | 7^{7}

Third round
1 | (France) J-W Tsonga | 6 | 6
Q | (Monaco) H Nys | 2 | 2
9 | (France) A Hoang | 6 | 6
6 | (France) C Moutet | 2 | 1

Quarterfinals
1 | (France) J-W Tsonga | 6 | 6^{5} | 6
9 | (France) A Hoang | 2 | 7^{7} | 3

==== Section 2 ====
First round
(France) C Lestienne | 6 | 3 | 6
(Russia) A Karatsev | 3 | 6 | 3
(Germany) O Otte | 6^{5} | 3
(Austria) L Miedler | 7^{7} | 6
(Germany) C-M Stebe | 6 | 1
(Croatia) V Galović | 2 | 0^{r}
(Russia) E Karlovskiy | 6^{6} | 4
(Belarus) I Ivashka | 7^{8} | 6

Second round
3 | (Slovenia) A Bedene | 6 | 3 | 7
(France) C Lestienne | 4 | 6 | 5
(Austria) L Miedler | 6^{1} | 2
15 | (Italy) J Sinner | 7^{7} | 6
12 | (Russia) E Donskoy | 7^{7} | 6
(Germany) C-M Stebe | 6^{2} | 4
(Belarus) I Ivashka | 6^{7} | 3
8/WC | (Sweden) M Ymer | 7^{9} | 6

Third round
3 | (Slovenia) A Bedene | 6 | 4 | 6
15 | (Italy) J Sinner | 4 | 6 | 4
12 | (Russia) E Donskoy | 3 | 2
8/WC | (Sweden) M Ymer | 6 | 6

Quarterfinals
3 | (Slovenia) A Bedene | 6^{2} | 4
8/WC | (Sweden) M Ymer | 7^{7} | 6

=== Bottom half ===
==== Section 3 ====
First round
(France) A Müller | 4 | 4
(India) R Ramanathan | 6 | 6
Q | (Norway) V Durasovic | 6 | 7^{14}
(Germany) J Lenz | 3 | 6^{12}
WC | (France) R Roumane | 6 | 6
(Russia) R Safiullin | 3 | 4
(France) M Janvier | 6 | 6
(Spain) N Kuhn | 2 | 4

Second round
7 | (France) G Barrère | 7 | 6
(India) R Ramanathan | 5 | 4
Q | (Norway) V Durasovic | 6 | 3 | 2
10 | (Tunisia) M Jaziri | 1 | 6 | 6
13 | (Austria) D Novak | 6 | 5 | 6^{4}
WC | (France) R Roumane | 3 | 7 | 7^{7}
(France) M Janvier | 6 | 6
4 | (Italy) S Travaglia | 3 | 2

Third round
7 | (France) G Barrère | 6 | 6
10 | (Tunisia) M Jaziri | 3 | 2
WC | (France) R Roumane | 4 | 6^{2}
(France) M Janvier | 6 | 7^{7}

Quarterfinals
7 | (France) G Barrère | 4 | 7^{9} | 6
(France) M Janvier | 6 | 6^{7} | 2

==== Section 4 ====
First round
(France) T Lamasine | 6 | 6
(Germany) T Kamke | 3 | 1
(France) Q Halys | 4 | 4
(Czech Republic) Z Kolář | 6 | 6
(Belgium) R Bemelmans | 7^{7} | 6
(Bosnia and Herzegovina) M Bašić | 6^{4} | 3
(Ukraine) S Stakhovsky | 7 | 6
WC | (France) Antoine Cornut-Chauvinc | 5 | 4

Second round
5 | (Romania) M Copil | 4 | 1
(France) T Lamasine | 6 | 6
(Czech Republic) Z Kolář | 0 | 3
11 | (Slovakia) N Gombos | 6 | 6
16 | (Germany) Y Maden | 4 | 7^{7} | 7^{7}
(Belgium) R Bemelmans | 6 | 6^{4} | 6^{4}
(Ukraine) S Stakhovsky | 4 | 7 | 7^{7}
2 | (France) U Humbert | 6 | 5 | 6^{5}

Third round
(France) T Lamasine | 6^{8} | 6 | 6
11 | (Slovakia) N Gombos | 7^{10} | 3 | 2
16 | (Germany) Y Maden | 7^{7} | 3 | 4
(Ukraine) S Stakhovsky | 6^{1} | 6 | 6

Quarterfinals
(France) T Lamasine | 7^{8} | 6
(Ukraine) S Stakhovsky | 6^{6} | 4
