= 2011 Open d'Orléans – Doubles =

Tennis tournament in France

Doubles
- 2011 Open d'Orléans

Final
- Champions: (France) Pierre-Hugues Herbert; (France) Nicolas Renavand
- Runners-up: (Czech Republic) David Škoch; (Italy) Simone Vagnozzi
- Score: 7–5, 6–3

Events
Singles	Doubles
← 2010 ·	Open d'Orléans	· 2012 →

Pierre-Hugues Herbert and Nicolas Renavand defended their title by defeating David Škoch and Simone Vagnozzi 7–5, 6–3 in the final.

== Seeds ==
1. (United Kingdom) Jamie Delgado / (United Kingdom) Jonathan Marray (quarterfinals)
2. (France) Arnaud Clément / (France) Nicolas Mahut (first round)
3. (Germany) Dustin Brown / (Australia) Colin Ebelthite (first round)
4. (United Kingdom) Ken Skupski / (Croatia) Lovro Zovko (first round)

== Draw ==
=== Key ===
- Q = Qualifier
- WC = Wild card
- LL = Lucky loser
- Alt = Alternate
- ITF = ITF entry
- PR = Protected ranking
- SR = Special ranking
- SE = Special exempt
- JE = Junior exempt
- JR = Junior Accelerator Programme entrant
- CO = College Accelerator Programme entrant
- NG = Next Gen Accelerator Program entrant
- w/o = Walkover
- r = Retired
- d = Defaulted

=== Draw ===
First round

Quarterfinals

Semifinals

Final

1
- (United Kingdom) J Delgado
- (United Kingdom) J Marray
7
7^{7}

- (Belgium) R Bemelmans
- (Slovakia) M Kližan
5
6^{5}

1
- (United Kingdom) J Delgado
- (United Kingdom) J Marray
4
4

WC
- (France) Dorian Descloix
- (France) M Teixeira
2
4

- (Czech Republic) D Škoch
- (Italy) S Vagnozzi
6
6

- (Czech Republic) D Škoch
- (Italy) S Vagnozzi
6
6

- (Czech Republic) D Škoch
- (Italy) S Vagnozzi
7^{7}
6

3
- (Germany) D Brown
- (Australia) C Ebelthite
2
6
[7]

- (Spain) R Bautista Agut
- (Australia) A Feeney
6^{5}
4

- (Poland) T Bednarek
- (France) O Charroin
6
3
[10]

- (Poland) T Bednarek
- (France) O Charroin
2
3

- (Spain) R Bautista Agut
- (Australia) A Feeney
w/o

- (Spain) R Bautista Agut
- (Australia) A Feeney
6
6

- (France) A Gensse
- (France) D Guez

- (Czech Republic) D Škoch
- (Italy) S Vagnozzi
5
3

WC
- (France) V Millot
- (France) M Rodrigues
1
5

- (France) P-H Herbert
- (France) N Renavand
7
6

- (Spain) A Menéndez
- (Italy) A Motti
6
7

- (Spain) A Menéndez
- (Italy) A Motti
6
6

- (Czech Republic) J Hájek
- (Slovakia) L Lacko
6
6

- (Czech Republic) J Hájek
- (Slovakia) L Lacko
3
4

4
- (United Kingdom) K Skupski
- (Croatia) L Zovko
3
4

- (Spain) A Menéndez
- (Italy) A Motti
1
6^{3}

WC
- (France) K de Schepper
- (France) A Olivetti
6^{4}
7^{9}
[4]

- (France) P-H Herbert
- (France) N Renavand
6
7^{7}

- (France) P-H Herbert
- (France) N Renavand
7^{7}
6^{7}
[10]

- (France) P-H Herbert
- (France) N Renavand
6
6

- (Ukraine) S Bubka
- (Romania) A Ungur
6
6

- (Ukraine) S Bubka
- (Romania) A Ungur
2
3

2
- (France) A Clément
- (France) N Mahut
4
2
