= 2014 Open d'Orléans – Singles =

Tennis tournament in France

Singles
- 2014 Open d'Orléans

Final
- Champion: (Ukraine) Sergiy Stakhovsky
- Runner-up: (Brazil) Thomaz Bellucci
- Score: 6–2, 7–5

Events
Singles	Doubles
← 2013 ·	Open d'Orléans	· 2015 →

Radek Štěpánek was the defending champion, but chose not to compete.

Sergiy Stakhovsky won the title, defeating Thomaz Bellucci 6–2, 7–5 in the final.

== Seeds ==
1. (Germany) Philipp Kohlschreiber (first round)
2. (Netherlands) Igor Sijsling (quarterfinals)
3. (Czech Republic) Jiří Veselý (semifinals)
4. (Russia) Andrey Kuznetsov (first round)
5. (Brazil) Thomaz Bellucci (final)
6. (Ukraine) Sergiy Stakhovsky (champion)
7. (France) Paul-Henri Mathieu (semifinals)
8. (France) Nicolas Mahut (first round)

== Draw ==
=== Key ===
- Q = Qualifier
- WC = Wild card
- LL = Lucky loser
- Alt = Alternate
- ITF = ITF entry
- PR = Protected ranking
- SR = Special ranking
- SE = Special exempt
- JE = Junior exempt
- JR = Junior Accelerator Programme entrant
- CO = College Accelerator Programme entrant
- NG = Next Gen Accelerator Program entrant
- w/o = Walkover
- r = Retired
- d = Defaulted

=== Finals ===
Semifinals
6	(Ukraine) Sergiy Stakhovsky	6^{5}	7	6
3	(Czech Republic) Jiří Veselý	7^{7}	5	0
7	(France) Paul-Henri Mathieu	3	4
5	(Brazil) Thomaz Bellucci	6	6

Final
6	(Ukraine) Sergiy Stakhovsky	6	7
5	(Brazil) Thomaz Bellucci	2	5

=== Top half ===
First round
1/WC	(Germany) P Kohlschreiber	6^{3}	1
(Germany) T Pütz	7^{7}	6
Q	(Russia) D Matsukevich	6	3	4
(Germany) D Brown	2	6	6
(Slovakia) M Mečíř	4	2
(Germany) M Berrer	6	6
WC	(France) T Lamasine	6^{4}	3
6	(Ukraine) S Stakhovsky	7^{7}	6
3	(Czech Republic) J Veselý	6	7
Q	(New Zealand) A Sitak	2	5
Alt	(France) D Guez	6	6
(Serbia) I Bozoljac	2	4
(Slovakia) N Gomboš	6^{5}	3
(Germany) A Beck	7^{7}	6
(Belgium) R Bemelmans	6	6
8	(France) N Mahut	3	4

Second round
(Germany) T Pütz	6	6
(Germany) D Brown	3	3
(Germany) M Berrer	3	1
6	(Ukraine) S Stakhovsky	6	6
3	(Czech Republic) J Veselý	6	6
Alt	(France) D Guez	4	1
(Germany) A Beck	7^{7}	6
(Belgium) R Bemelmans	6^{3}	2

Quarterfinals
(Germany) T Pütz	7^{7}	1	3
6	(Ukraine) S Stakhovsky	6^{3}	6	6
3	(Czech Republic) J Veselý	w/o
(Germany) A Beck

Semifinals
6	(Ukraine) S Stakhovsky	6^{5}	7	6
3	(Czech Republic) J Veselý	7^{7}	5	0

=== Bottom half ===
First round
7	(France) P-H Mathieu	6	6
(Croatia) A Pavić	3	4
(France) V Millot	6	6
(Switzerland) Y Marti	4	3
(Austria) M Fischer	6	4	6
Q	(Switzerland) M Lammer	4	6	1
WC	(France) E Couacaud	6	6
4	(Russia) A Kuznetsov	4	1
5	(Brazil) T Bellucci	7	4	6
(France) M Gicquel	5	6	3
(Russia) A Kudryavtsev	3	2
WC	(France) L Lokoli	6	6
Q	(France) G Barrère	1	2
(France) K de Schepper	6	6
(Germany) A Zverev	7^{8}	2	0
2	(Netherlands) I Sijsling	6^{6}	6	6

Second round
7	(France) P-H Mathieu	6	3	7
(France) V Millot	3	6	5
(Austria) M Fischer	4	7^{7}	7^{7}
WC	(France) E Couacaud	6	6^{5}	6^{1}
5	(Brazil) T Bellucci	6	4	7^{7}
WC	(France) L Lokoli	3	6	6^{1}
(France) K de Schepper	4	6	3
2	(Netherlands) I Sijsling	6	3	6

Quarterfinals
7	(France) P-H Mathieu	6	6
(Austria) M Fischer	2	3
5	(Brazil) T Bellucci	6	6
2	(Netherlands) I Sijsling	4	1

Semifinals
7	(France) P-H Mathieu	3	4
5	(Brazil) T Bellucci	6	6
