= 2014 Open d'Orléans – Doubles =

Tennis tournament in France

Doubles
- 2014 Open d'Orléans

Final
- Champions: (Brazil) Thomaz Bellucci (Brazil) André Sá
- Runners-up: (United States) James Cerretani (Sweden) Andreas Siljeström
- Score: 5–7, 6–4, [10–8]

Events
| Singles | Doubles |
| ← 2013 · | Open d'Orléans | · 2015 → |

Illya Marchenko and Sergiy Stakhovsky were the defending tennis doubles champions, but neither player chose to participate.

Thomaz Bellucci and André Sá won the title, defeating James Cerretani and Andreas Siljeström 5–7, 6–4, [10–8] in the final.

== Seeds ==
1. (United Kingdom) Ken Skupski / (United Kingdom) Neal Skupski (first round)
2. (Poland) Tomasz Bednarek / (Poland) Mateusz Kowalczyk (semifinals)
3. (Israel) Jonathan Erlich / (Germany) Philipp Marx (quarterfinals)
4. (Germany) Martin Emmrich / (Germany) Gero Kretschmer (first round)

== Draw ==
=== Key ===
- Q = Qualifier
- WC = Wild card
- LL = Lucky loser
- Alt = Alternate
- ITF = ITF entry
- PR = Protected ranking
- SR = Special ranking
- SE = Special exempt
- JE = Junior exempt
- JR = Junior Accelerator Programme entrant
- CO = College Accelerator Programme entrant
- NG = Next Gen Accelerator Program entrant
- w/o = Walkover
- r = Retired
- d = Defaulted

=== Draw ===
First round
1 | (United Kingdom) K Skupski (United Kingdom) N Skupski | 4 | 7^{7} | [7]
(New Zealand) M Daniell (New Zealand) A Sitak | 6 | 6^{2} | [10]
WC | (France) K de Schepper (France) F Martin | 6 | 7^{7}
(Croatia) A Pavić (Croatia) F Škugor | 4 | 6^{2}
3 | (Israel) J Erlich (Germany) P Marx | 6 | 6
(Slovakia) N Gomboš (Czech Republic) J Veselý | 3 | 4
WC | (France) E Couacaud (France) L Lokoli | 5 | 5
(Brazil) T Bellucci (Brazil) A Sá | 7 | 7
WC | (Belgium) R Bemelmans (France) V Millot | 3 | 4
(United States) J Cerretani (Sweden) A Siljeström | 6 | 6
(Germany) A Beck (Germany) T Pütz | 7^{7} | 6
4 | (Germany) M Emmrich (Germany) G Kretschmer | 6^{3} | 1
PR | (France) O Charroin (Italy) A Motti | 4 | 6 | [10]
(Russia) A Kuznetsov (Germany) A Zverev | 6 | 2 | [7]
(Germany) D Brown (Germany) C Kas | 4 | 7^{11} | [7]
2 | (Poland) T Bednarek (Poland) M Kowalczyk | 6 | 6^{9} | [10]

Quarterfinals
(New Zealand) M Daniell (New Zealand) A Sitak | 7 | 6
WC | (France) K de Schepper (France) F Martin | 5 | 2
3 | (Israel) J Erlich (Germany) P Marx | 2 | 4
(Brazil) T Bellucci (Brazil) A Sá | 6 | 6
(United States) J Cerretani (Sweden) A Siljeström | w/o
(Germany) A Beck (Germany) T Pütz
PR | (France) O Charroin (Italy) A Motti | 2 | 6^{2}
2 | (Poland) T Bednarek (Poland) M Kowalczyk | 6 | 7^{7}

Semifinals
(New Zealand) M Daniell (New Zealand) A Sitak | 3 | 6^{3}
(Brazil) T Bellucci (Brazil) A Sá | 6 | 7^{7}
(United States) J Cerretani (Sweden) A Siljeström | 6 | 6
2 | (Poland) T Bednarek (Poland) M Kowalczyk | 3 | 4

Final
(Brazil) T Bellucci (Brazil) A Sá | 5 | 6 | [10]
(United States) J Cerretani (Sweden) A Siljeström | 7 | 4 | [8]
