= 2013 Open d'Orléans – Doubles =

Tennis tournament in France

Doubles
- 2013 Open d'Orléans

Final
- Champions: (Ukraine) Illya Marchenko (Ukraine) Sergiy Stakhovsky
- Runners-up: (Lithuania) Ričardas Berankis (Croatia) Franko Škugor
- Score: 7–5, 6–3

Events
Singles	Doubles
← 2012 ·	Open d'Orléans	· 2014 →

Lukáš Dlouhý and Gilles Müller were the defending champions, but decided not to compete.

Illya Marchenko and Sergiy Stakhovsky won the title, defeating Ričardas Berankis and Franko Škugor in the final, 7–5, 6–3.

== Seeds ==
1. (Germany) Dustin Brown / (Germany) Philipp Marx (quarterfinals)
2. (France) Benoît Paire / (France) Nicolas Renavand (quarterfinals)
3. (United Kingdom) Ken Skupski / (United Kingdom) Neal Skupski (semifinals)
4. (Netherlands) Jesse Huta Galung / (Russia) Konstantin Kravchuk (quarterfinals)

== Draw ==
=== Key ===
- Q = Qualifier
- WC = Wild card
- LL = Lucky loser
- Alt = Alternate
- ITF = ITF entry
- PR = Protected ranking
- SR = Special ranking
- SE = Special exempt
- JE = Junior exempt
- JR = Junior Accelerator Programme entrant
- CO = College Accelerator Programme entrant
- NG = Next Gen Accelerator Program entrant
- w/o = Walkover
- r = Retired
- d = Defaulted

=== Draw ===
First round
1	(Germany) D Brown (Germany) P Marx	3	6	[10]
(Czech Republic) J Mertl (Czech Republic) J Veselý	6	0	[7]
(Romania) M Copil (Germany) J-L Struff	6^{1}	7^{10}	[8]
(Lithuania) R Berankis (Croatia) F Škugor	7^{7}	6^{8}	[10]
3	(United Kingdom) K Skupski (United Kingdom) N Skupski	6	3	[10]
(United Kingdom) D Rice (United Kingdom) S Thornley	4	6	[7]
(Germany) M Bachinger (Germany) M Berrer	6	7^{7}
WC	(France) P-H Herbert (France) A Olivetti	3	6^{3}
(Ukraine) I Marchenko (Ukraine) S Stakhovsky	5	7^{11}	[10]
(Russia) T Gabashvili (Sweden) A Siljeström	7	6^{9}	[5]
WC	(France) M Gicquel (France) V Millot	3	6^{4}
4	(Netherlands) J Huta Galung (Russia) K Kravchuk	6	7^{7}
(Belgium) R Bemelmans (Belgium) X Malisse	6	7^{8}
(Argentina) L Mayer (Spain) A Menéndez-Maceiras	2	6^{6}
WC	(France) J Ouanna (France) M Rodrigues	6^{5}	2
2	(France) B Paire (France) N Renavand	7^{7}	6

Quarterfinals
1	(Germany) D Brown (Germany) P Marx	6^{6}	5
(Lithuania) R Berankis (Croatia) F Škugor	7^{8}	7
3	(United Kingdom) K Skupski (United Kingdom) N Skupski	6	6
(Germany) M Bachinger (Germany) M Berrer	4	3
(Ukraine) I Marchenko (Ukraine) S Stakhovsky	7	6
4	(Netherlands) J Huta Galung (Russia) K Kravchuk	5	2
(Belgium) R Bemelmans (Belgium) X Malisse	6	3	[10]
2	(France) B Paire (France) N Renavand	4	6	[3]

Semifinals
(Lithuania) R Berankis (Croatia) F Škugor	6	7^{8}
3	(United Kingdom) K Skupski (United Kingdom) N Skupski	4	6^{6}
(Ukraine) I Marchenko (Ukraine) S Stakhovsky	w/o
(Belgium) R Bemelmans (Belgium) X Malisse

Final
(Lithuania) R Berankis (Croatia) F Škugor	5	3
(Ukraine) I Marchenko (Ukraine) S Stakhovsky	7	6
