= 2017 Open d'Orléans – Singles =

Tennis tournament in France

Singles
- 2017 Open d'Orléans

Final
- Champion: (Slovakia) Norbert Gombos
- Runner-up: (France) Julien Benneteau
- Score: 6–3, 5–7, 6–2

Events
Singles	Doubles
← 2016 ·	Open d'Orléans	· 2018 →

Pierre-Hugues Herbert was the defending champion but lost in the second round to Illya Marchenko.

Norbert Gombos won the title after defeating Julien Benneteau 6–3, 5–7, 6–2 in the final.

== Seeds ==
1. (Argentina) Horacio Zeballos (quarterfinals)
2. (France) Pierre-Hugues Herbert (second round)
3. (Kazakhstan) Mikhail Kukushkin (second round)
4. (Slovakia) Norbert Gombos (champion)
5. (Russia) Andrey Kuznetsov (quarterfinals)
6. (France) Julien Benneteau (final)
7. (Kazakhstan) Alexander Bublik (second round)
8. (France) Nicolas Mahut (quarterfinals)

== Draw ==
=== Key ===
- Q = Qualifier
- WC = Wild card
- LL = Lucky loser
- Alt = Alternate
- ITF = ITF entry
- PR = Protected ranking
- SR = Special ranking
- SE = Special exempt
- JE = Junior exempt
- JR = Junior Accelerator Programme entrant
- CO = College Accelerator Programme entrant
- NG = Next Gen Accelerator Program entrant
- w/o = Walkover
- r = Retired
- d = Defaulted

=== Finals ===
Semifinals
(Hungary) Márton Fucsovics	6	3	6^{7}
6	(France) Julien Benneteau	3	6	7^{9}
4	(Slovakia) Norbert Gombos	6	6
(Ukraine) Illya Marchenko	4	1

Final
6	(France) Julien Benneteau	3	7	2
4	(Slovakia) Norbert Gombos	6	5	6

=== Top half ===
First round
1	(Argentina) H Zeballos	6	6
SE	(France) S Robert	4	0
(France) M Bourgue	4	5
WC	(France) G Blancaneaux	6	7
(Hungary) M Fucsovics	7^{7}	7^{7}
(Poland) J Janowicz	6^{4}	6^{5}
PR	(Netherlands) I Sijsling	7^{7}	2	2^{r}
7	(Kazakhstan) A Bublik	6^{5}	6	3
3	(Kazakhstan) M Kukushkin	6	6
Q	(Argentina) G Durán	1	3
WC	(France) P-H Mathieu	6	6
Q	(France) G Sakharov	3	1
(France) K de Schepper	6	6
WC	(Latvia) E Gulbis	4	1
Q	(Croatia) A Šančić	2	1
6	(France) J Benneteau	6	6

Second round
1	(Argentina) H Zeballos	6	7^{7}
WC	(France) G Blancaneaux	2	6^{4}
(Hungary) M Fucsovics	3	7	6
7	(Kazakhstan) A Bublik	6	5	3
3	(Kazakhstan) M Kukushkin	6^{7}	1
WC	(France) P-H Mathieu	7^{9}	6
(France) K de Schepper	2	2
6	(France) J Benneteau	6	6

Quarterfinals
1	(Argentina) H Zeballos	3	6^{1}
(Hungary) M Fucsovics	6	7^{7}
WC	(France) P-H Mathieu	4	1
6	(France) J Benneteau	6	6

Semifinals
(Hungary) M Fucsovics	6	3	6^{7}
6	(France) J Benneteau	3	6	7^{9}

=== Bottom half ===
First round
5	(Russia) A Kuznetsov	6	6
(Russia) A Vatutin	1	3
SE	(Serbia) D Petrović	6	6
LL	(France) C Denolly	2	3
(Germany) Y Maden	6	6
(Austria) S Ofner	3	4
(Germany) D Brown	3	6^{2}
4	(Slovakia) N Gombos	6	7^{7}
8	(France) N Mahut	6	6
WC	(France) B Bonzi	3	2
(Bosnia and Herzegovina) M Bašić	7^{10}	4	2
(Lithuania) R Berankis	6^{8}	6	6
(Bosnia and Herzegovina) A Šetkić	3	5
(Ukraine) I Marchenko	6	7
Q	(France) F Reboul	2	0^{r}
2	(France) P-H Herbert	6	0

Second round
5	(Russia) A Kuznetsov	6^{5}	6	6
SE	(Serbia) D Petrović	7^{7}	2	3
(Germany) Y Maden	0	6	3
4	(Slovakia) N Gombos	6	4	6
8	(France) N Mahut	6	6
(Lithuania) R Berankis	2	1
(Ukraine) I Marchenko	1	6	6
2	(France) P-H Herbert	6	3	4

Quarterfinals
5	(Russia) A Kuznetsov	2	6	6^{5}
4	(Slovakia) N Gombos	6	4	7^{7}
8	(France) N Mahut	6^{3}	1
(Ukraine) I Marchenko	7^{7}	6

Semifinals
4	(Slovakia) N Gombos	6	6
(Ukraine) I Marchenko	4	1
