= 2019 Open d'Orléans – Doubles =

Tennis tournament in France

Doubles
- 2019 Open d'Orléans

Final
- Champions: (Monaco) Romain Arneodo (Monaco) Hugo Nys
- Runners-up: (Chile) Hans Podlipnik Castillo (Austria) Tristan-Samuel Weissborn
- Score: 6–7^{(5–7)}, 6–3, [10–1]

Events
Singles	Doubles
← 2018 ·	Open d'Orléans	· 2021 →

Luke Bambridge and Jonny O'Mara were the defending champions but only O'Mara chose to defend his title, partnering Ken Skupski. O'Mara lost in the semifinals to Hans Podlipnik Castillo and Tristan-Samuel Weissborn.

Romain Arneodo and Hugo Nys won the title after defeating Podlipnik Castillo and Weissborn 6–7^{(5–7)}, 6–3, [10–1] in the final.

== Seeds ==
1. (United Kingdom) Jonny O'Mara / (United Kingdom) Ken Skupski (semifinals)
2. (Monaco) Romain Arneodo / (Monaco) Hugo Nys (champions)
3. (Netherlands) Sander Arends / (Netherlands) David Pel (quarterfinals)
4. (Chile) Hans Podlipnik Castillo / (Austria) Tristan-Samuel Weissborn (final)

== Draw ==
=== Key ===
- Q = Qualifier
- WC = Wild card
- LL = Lucky loser
- Alt = Alternate
- ITF = ITF entry
- PR = Protected ranking
- SR = Special ranking
- SE = Special exempt
- JE = Junior exempt
- JR = Junior Accelerator Programme entrant
- CO = College Accelerator Programme entrant
- NG = Next Gen Accelerator Program entrant
- w/o = Walkover
- r = Retired
- d = Defaulted

First round
1	(United Kingdom) J O'Mara (United Kingdom) K Skupski	6	6
(Russia) E Donskoy (Belarus) I Ivashka	3	4
(Uruguay) A Behar (India) R Ramanathan	3	6	[12]
WC	(France) M Janvier (France) S Robert	6	3	[10]
4	(Chile) H Podlipnik Castillo (Austria) T-S Weissborn	6	6
(France) G Barrère (France) Q Halys	3	3
WC	(Belgium) R Bemelmans (Serbia) N Zimonjić	4	7^{7}	[10]
(Australia) R Junaid (India) P Raja	6	6^{4}	[6]
(Italy) R Marcora (Italy) S Travaglia	3	4
(Germany) A Begemann (Germany) J Lenz	6	6
(Romania) M Copil (Czech Republic) L Rosol	4	4
3	(Netherlands) S Arends (Netherlands) D Pel	6	6
(Spain) A Menéndez Maceiras (Ukraine) S Stakhovsky	6	6
WC	(France) G Blancaneaux (France) A Müller	0	4
(United States) N Lammons (Croatia) A Šančić	6^{7}	6^{4}
2	(Monaco) R Arneodo (Monaco) H Nys	7^{9}	7^{7}

Quarterfinals
1	(United Kingdom) J O'Mara (United Kingdom) K Skupski	6	6
(Uruguay) A Behar (India) R Ramanathan	3	4
4	(Chile) H Podlipnik Castillo (Austria) T-S Weissborn	6	6
WC	(Belgium) R Bemelmans (Serbia) N Zimonjić	3	4
(Germany) A Begemann (Germany) J Lenz	6^{4}	6	[10]
3	(Netherlands) S Arends (Netherlands) D Pel	7^{7}	4	[8]
(Spain) A Menéndez Maceiras (Ukraine) S Stakhovsky	4	6^{4}
2	(Monaco) R Arneodo (Monaco) H Nys	6	7^{7}

Semifinals
1	(United Kingdom) J O'Mara (United Kingdom) K Skupski	6	6^{1}	[5]
4	(Chile) H Podlipnik Castillo (Austria) T-S Weissborn	2	7^{7}	[10]
(Germany) A Begemann (Germany) J Lenz	5	6	[6]
2	(Monaco) R Arneodo (Monaco) H Nys	7	3	[10]

Final
4	(Chile) H Podlipnik Castillo (Austria) T-S Weissborn	7^{7}	3	[1]
2	(Monaco) R Arneodo (Monaco) H Nys	6^{5}	6	[10]
