= 2012 Open d'Orléans – Doubles =

Tennis tournament in France

Doubles
- 2012 Open d'Orléans

Final
- Champions: (Czech Republic) Lukáš Dlouhý; (Luxembourg) Gilles Müller
- Runners-up: (Belgium) Xavier Malisse; (United Kingdom) Ken Skupski
- Score: 6–2, 6–7^{(5–7)}, [10–7]

Events
Singles	Doubles
← 2011 ·	Open d'Orléans	· 2013 →

Pierre-Hugues Herbert and Nicolas Renavand are the defending champions, but lost in the first round this year.
Lukáš Dlouhý and Gilles Müller won the title, defeating Xavier Malisse and Ken Skupski 6–2, 6–7^{(5–7)}, [10–7] in the final.

== Seeds ==
1. (Belgium) Xavier Malisse / (United Kingdom) Ken Skupski (final)
2. (Germany) Dustin Brown / (Canada) Adil Shamasdin (quarterfinals)
3. (Australia) Rameez Junaid / (South Africa) Raven Klaasen (quarterfinals)
4. (Germany) Philipp Marx / (Romania) Florin Mergea (semifinals)

== Draw ==
=== Key ===
- Q = Qualifier
- WC = Wild card
- LL = Lucky loser
- Alt = Alternate
- ITF = ITF entry
- PR = Protected ranking
- SR = Special ranking
- SE = Special exempt
- JE = Junior exempt
- JR = Junior Accelerator Programme entrant
- CO = College Accelerator Programme entrant
- NG = Next Gen Accelerator Program entrant
- w/o = Walkover
- r = Retired
- d = Defaulted

=== Draw ===
First round

Quarterfinals

Semifinals

Final

1
- (Belgium) X Malisse
- (United Kingdom) K Skupski
6
6

- (Russia) E Donskoy
- (United States) J Levine
0
4

1
- (Belgium) X Malisse
- (United Kingdom) K Skupski
5
6
[10]

- (Belgium) R Bemelmans
- (Australia) J Kerr
6
6

- (Belgium) R Bemelmans
- (Australia) J Kerr
7
4
[8]

- (Croatia) M Pavić
- (Croatia) F Škugor
4
2

1
- (Belgium) X Malisse
- (United Kingdom) K Skupski
6
7^{7}

4
- (Germany) P Marx
- (Romania) F Mergea
7^{7}
6

4
- (Germany) P Marx
- (Romania) F Mergea
4
6^{2}

- (France) A Mannarino
- (France) M Teixeira
6^{5}
2

4
- (Germany) P Marx
- (Romania) F Mergea
6
4
[10]

- (France) A Olivetti
- (France) J Ouanna
4
4

- (Poland) T Bednarek
- (Poland) M Kowalczyk
2
6
[4]

- (Poland) T Bednarek
- (Poland) M Kowalczyk
6
6

1
- (Belgium) X Malisse
- (United Kingdom) K Skupski
2
7^{7}
[7]

- (France) G Burquier
- (France) F Martin
3
7^{7}
[7]

- (Czech Republic) L Dlouhý
- (Luxembourg) G Müller
6
6^{5}
[10]

- (Lithuania) R Berankis
- (Latvia) E Gulbis
6
6^{4}
[10]

- (Lithuania) R Berankis
- (Latvia) E Gulbis
6
3
[10]

- (Sweden) A Siljeström
- (Czech Republic) D Škoch
6
1
[5]

3
- (Australia) R Junaid
- (South Africa) R Klaasen
1
6
[7]

3
- (Australia) R Junaid
- (South Africa) R Klaasen
2
6
[10]

- (Lithuania) R Berankis
- (Latvia) E Gulbis

- (Czech Republic) L Rosol
- (Slovakia) I Zelenay
7
3
[12]

- (Czech Republic) L Dlouhý
- (Luxembourg) G Müller
w/o

- (Czech Republic) L Dlouhý
- (Luxembourg) G Müller
5
6
[14]

- (Czech Republic) L Dlouhý
- (Luxembourg) G Müller
6
6

- (France) P-H Herbert
- (France) N Renavand
4
5

2
- (Germany) D Brown
- (Canada) A Shamasdin
2
2

2
- (Germany) D Brown
- (Canada) A Shamasdin
6
7
