= 2015 Open d'Orléans – Singles =

Tennis tournament in France

Singles
- 2015 Open d'Orléans

Final
- Champion: (Germany) Jan-Lennard Struff
- Runner-up: (Poland) Jerzy Janowicz
- Score: 5–7, 6–4, 6–3

Events
Singles	Doubles
← 2014 ·	Open d'Orléans	· 2016 →

Sergiy Stakhovsky is the defending champion.

== Seeds ==
1. (Ukraine) Sergiy Stakhovsky (quarterfinals)
2. (Poland) Jerzy Janowicz (final)
3. (Turkey) Marsel İlhan (second round)
4. (France) Paul-Henri Mathieu (quarterfinals)
5. (Croatia) Ivan Dodig (second round)
6. (Slovakia) Lukáš Lacko (second round)
7. (Slovakia) Norbert Gombos (first round)
8. (Ukraine) Illya Marchenko (semifinals)

== Draw ==
=== Key ===
- Q = Qualifier
- WC = Wild card
- LL = Lucky loser
- Alt = Alternate
- ITF = ITF entry
- PR = Protected ranking
- SR = Special ranking
- SE = Special exempt
- JE = Junior exempt
- JR = Junior Accelerator Programme entrant
- CO = College Accelerator Programme entrant
- NG = Next Gen Accelerator Program entrant
- w/o = Walkover
- r = Retired
- d = Defaulted

=== Finals ===
Semifinals
(Germany) Jan-Lennard Struff	6	3	6
(France) Kenny de Schepper	2	6	3
8	(Ukraine) Illya Marchenko	1	6	4
2	(Poland) Jerzy Janowicz	6	2	6

Final
(Germany) Jan-Lennard Struff	5	6	6
2	(Poland) Jerzy Janowicz	7	4	3

=== Top half ===
First round
1	(Ukraine) S Stakhovsky	6	6^{6}	6
Q	(Croatia) F Veger	4	7^{8}	3
(Kazakhstan) A Golubev	7^{10}	7^{7}
(Romania) M Copil	6^{8}	6^{3}
WC	(France) G Barrère	1	4
(Germany) J-L Struff	6	6
WC	(Spain) J Munar	6	5	1
5	(Croatia) I Dodig	4	7	6
3	(Turkey) M İlhan	6	6
WC	(France) E Couacaud	1	2
(France) D Guez	3	2
(France) K de Schepper	6	6
(Netherlands) I Sijsling	6	6
Q	(France) M Teixeira	2	2
PR	(Switzerland) M Chiudinelli	6^{2}	6	6
7	(Slovakia) N Gombos	7^{7}	4	2

Second round
1	(Ukraine) S Stakhovsky	6	6
(Kazakhstan) A Golubev	1	3
(Germany) J-L Struff	3	7^{7}	6
5	(Croatia) I Dodig	6	6^{5}	2
3	(Turkey) M İlhan	6^{5}	4
(France) K de Schepper	7^{7}	6
(Netherlands) I Sijsling	3	7	3
PR	(Switzerland) M Chiudinelli	6	5	6

Quarterfinals
1	(Ukraine) S Stakhovsky	4	2
(Germany) J-L Struff	6	6
(France) K de Schepper	7^{11}	6
PR	(Switzerland) M Chiudinelli	6^{9}	3

Semifinals
(Germany) J-L Struff	6	3	6
(France) K de Schepper	2	6	3

=== Bottom half ===
First round
8	(Ukraine) I Marchenko	6	6
Q	(France) Maxime Tabatruong	3	2
WC	(France) A Sidorenko	3	6	6
(Belgium) Y Mertens	6	4	4
(France) É Roger-Vasselin	6	6
(United Kingdom) J Ward	3	3
Q	(Switzerland) Y Marti	2	6^{2}
4	(France) P-H Mathieu	6	7^{7}
6	(Slovakia) L Lacko	6	6
(Germany) N Langer	2	1
(Czech Republic) J Mertl	2	4
SE	(Croatia) F Škugor	6	6
(France) T Lamasine	1	1
(France) V Millot	6	6
(Belgium) N Desein	4	3
2	(Poland) J Janowicz	6	6

Second round
8	(Ukraine) I Marchenko	6	6
WC	(France) A Sidorenko	2	2
(France) É Roger-Vasselin	3	6	4
4	(France) P-H Mathieu	6	1	6
6	(Slovakia) L Lacko	3	6	6^{2}
SE	(Croatia) F Škugor	6	1	7^{7}
(France) V Millot	6	3	2
2	(Poland) J Janowicz	4	6	6

Quarterfinals
8	(Ukraine) I Marchenko	6	6
4	(France) P-H Mathieu	4	4
SE	(Croatia) F Škugor	4	4
2	(Poland) J Janowicz	6	6

Semifinals
8	(Ukraine) I Marchenko	1	6	4
2	(Poland) J Janowicz	6	2	6
