= 2012 Open d'Orléans – Singles =

Tennis tournament in France

Singles
- 2012 Open d'Orléans

Final
- Champion: (Belgium) David Goffin
- Runner-up: (Belgium) Ruben Bemelmans
- Score: 6–4, 3–6, 6–3

Events
Singles	Doubles
← 2011 ·	Open d'Orléans	· 2013 →

Michaël Llodra was the defending champion.
David Goffin defeated Ruben Bemelmans 6–4, 3–6, 6–3 in the final to win the title.

== Seeds ==
1. (Germany) Philipp Kohlschreiber (first round)
2. (Belgium) David Goffin (champion)
3. (Belgium) Xavier Malisse (quarterfinals, retired)
4. (France) Nicolas Mahut (first round)
5. (Luxembourg) Gilles Müller (second round)
6. (Belgium) Steve Darcis (withdrew because of a right shoulder injury)
7. (United States) Jesse Levine (quarterfinals)
8. (Italy) Simone Bolelli (first round)

== Draw ==
=== Key ===
- Q = Qualifier
- WC = Wild card
- LL = Lucky loser
- Alt = Alternate
- ITF = ITF entry
- PR = Protected ranking
- SR = Special ranking
- SE = Special exempt
- JE = Junior exempt
- JR = Junior Accelerator Programme entrant
- CO = College Accelerator Programme entrant
- NG = Next Gen Accelerator Program entrant
- w/o = Walkover
- r = Retired
- d = Defaulted

=== Finals ===
Semifinals
(Belgium) Ruben Bemelmans	7^{7}	6
(Spain) Roberto Bautista Agut	6^{5}	3
(France) Josselin Ouanna	4	6^{3}
2	(Belgium) David Goffin	6	7^{7}

Final
(Belgium) Ruben Bemelmans	4	6	3
2	(Belgium) David Goffin	6	3	6

=== Top half ===
First round
1/WC	(Germany) P Kohlschreiber	5	4
WC	(France) A Mannarino	7	6
(France) É Roger-Vasselin	6	6^{5}	6
(France) M Llodra	3	7^{7}	2
WC	(France) A Olivetti	6	6^{5}	4
(Belgium) R Bemelmans	4	7^{7}	6
(Canada) F Dancevic	7^{8}	6
8	(Italy) S Bolelli	6^{6}	2
4	(France) N Mahut	6	4	2
(Latvia) E Gulbis	4	6	6
(Germany) D Brown	6	7^{7}
Q	(France) F Martin	4	6^{3}
(Germany) D Brands	6	6
(Belgium) O Rochus	3	3
(Spain) R Bautista Agut	6	6
LL	(France) M Teixeira	3	2

Second round
WC	(France) A Mannarino	3	3
(France) É Roger-Vasselin	6	6
(Belgium) R Bemelmans	7^{8}	7
(Canada) F Dancevic	6^{6}	5
(Latvia) E Gulbis	7^{7}	6
(Germany) D Brown	6^{4}	4
(Germany) D Brands	2	3
(Spain) R Bautista Agut	6	6

Quarterfinals
(France) É Roger-Vasselin	6^{5}	1
(Belgium) R Bemelmans	7^{7}	6
(Latvia) E Gulbis	6^{7}	r
(Spain) R Bautista Agut	7^{9}

Semifinals
(Belgium) R Bemelmans	7^{7}	6
(Spain) R Bautista Agut	6^{5}	3

=== Bottom half ===
First round
5	(Luxembourg) G Müller	6	6
WC	(France) P-H Herbert	4	4
(France) J Ouanna	6	6
(Tunisia) M Jaziri	3	4
(Lithuania) R Berankis	7^{7}	4	6
(Russia) E Donskoy	6^{3}	6	1
Q	(France) A Escoffier	2	0
3	(Belgium) X Malisse	6	6
7	(United States) J Levine	7^{7}	6
(France) F Serra	6^{2}	4
(Czech Republic) L Rosol	6	6
SE	(Russia) D Tursunov	4	4
Q	(Germany) N Langer	3	4
SE	(United States) S Johnson	6	6
Q	(France) N Renavand	3	3
2	(Belgium) D Goffin	6	6

Second round
5	(Luxembourg) G Müller	6	6^{2}	4
(France) J Ouanna	3	7^{7}	6
(Lithuania) R Berankis	4	6	3
3	(Belgium) X Malisse	6	4	6
7	(United States) J Levine	6	6
(Czech Republic) L Rosol	4	3
SE	(United States) S Johnson	5	4
2	(Belgium) D Goffin	7	6

Quarterfinals
(France) J Ouanna	7^{7}	2
3	(Belgium) X Malisse	6^{2}	1^{r}
7	(United States) J Levine	2	4
2	(Belgium) D Goffin	6	6

Semifinals
(France) J Ouanna	4	6^{3}
2	(Belgium) D Goffin	6	7^{7}
