= 2015 Open d'Orléans – Doubles =

Tennis tournament in France

Doubles
- 2015 Open d'Orléans
- 2014 Champion: (Brazil) Thomaz Bellucci (Brazil) André Sá

Events
Singles	Doubles
← 2014 ·	Open d'Orléans	· 2016 →

Thomaz Bellucci and André Sá were the defending champions, but chose not to participate this year

== Seeds ==
1. (United Kingdom) Ken Skupski / (United Kingdom) Neal Skupski (final)
2. (France) Tristan Lamasine / (France) Fabrice Martin (champions)
3. (Croatia) Franko Škugor / (Slovakia) Igor Zelenay (semifinals)
4. (United States) James Cerretani / (Austria) Tristan-Samuel Weissborn (semifinals)

== Draw ==
=== Key ===
- Q = Qualifier
- WC = Wild card
- LL = Lucky loser
- Alt = Alternate
- ITF = ITF entry
- PR = Protected ranking
- SR = Special ranking
- SE = Special exempt
- JE = Junior exempt
- JR = Junior Accelerator Programme entrant
- CO = College Accelerator Programme entrant
- NG = Next Gen Accelerator Program entrant
- w/o = Walkover
- r = Retired
- d = Defaulted

First round
(France) G Barrère (France) V Millot	4	6	[9]
(Belgium) Y Mertens (Netherlands) I Sijsling	6	4	[11]
4	(United States) J Cerretani (Austria) T-S Weissborn	6	6
(Kazakhstan) A Golubev (France) A Sidorenko	4	1
(Ukraine) I Marchenko (Ukraine) S Stakhovsky	4	4
(Slovakia) N Gombos (Czech Republic) J Mertl	6	6
WC	(France) D Guez (Togo) J-K Loglo	2	3
(France) E Couacaud (France) M Teixeira	6	6
(Germany) N Langer (Germany) J-L Struff	6	6
(France) Joffrey de Schepper (France) K de Schepper	2	4

Quarterfinals
1	(United Kingdom) K Skupski (United Kingdom) N Skupski	6	6
(Belgium) Y Mertens (Netherlands) I Sijsling	3	2
4	(United States) J Cerretani (Austria) T-S Weissborn	6	6
(Slovakia) N Gombos (Czech Republic) J Mertl	2	4
(France) E Couacaud (France) M Teixeira	4	3
3	(Croatia) F Škugor (Slovakia) I Zelenay	6	6
(Germany) N Langer (Germany) J-L Struff	6^{3}	4
2	(France) T Lamasine (France) F Martin	7^{7}	6

Semifinals
1	(United Kingdom) K Skupski (United Kingdom) N Skupski	6	7^{7}
4	(United States) J Cerretani (Austria) T-S Weissborn	3	6^{4}
3	(Croatia) F Škugor (Slovakia) I Zelenay	6	3	[5]
2	(France) T Lamasine (France) F Martin	4	6	[10]

Final
1	(United Kingdom) K Skupski (United Kingdom) N Skupski	4	6^{2}
2	(France) T Lamasine (France) F Martin	6	7^{7}
