= 2022 Open d'Orléans =

- Date: 26 September – 2 October
- Edition: 17th
- Surface: Hard (Indoor)
- Location: Orléans, France

Champions

Singles
- (France) Grégoire Barrère

Doubles
- (France) Nicolas Mahut / (France) Édouard Roger-Vasselin
← 2021 ·	Open d'Orléans	· 2023 →

The 2022 Open d'Orléans was a professional tennis tournament played on indoor hard courts. It was the seventeenth edition of the tournament which was part of the 2022 ATP Challenger Tour. It took place in Orléans, France between 26 September and 2 October 2022.

== Singles main-draw entrants ==
=== Seeds ===
Country	Player	Rank^{1}	Seed
FRA	Corentin Moutet	64	1
FRA	Hugo Gaston	79	2
FRA	Richard Gasquet	85	3
FRA	Quentin Halys	86	4
HUN	Márton Fucsovics	91	5
SVK	Norbert Gombos	101	6
SUI	Henri Laaksonen	125	7
USA	Jack Sock	128	8

- ^{1} Rankings are as of 19 September 2022.

=== Other entrants ===
The following players received wildcards into the singles main draw:

- (France) Richard Gasquet
- (France) Harold Mayot
- (France) Corentin Moutet

The following players received entry into the singles main draw as special exempts:

- (Bulgaria) Adrian Andreev
- (Bosnia and Herzegovina) Nerman Fatić

The following player received entry into the singles main draw as an alternate:

- (Tunisia) Skander Mansouri

The following players received entry from the qualifying draw:

- (United States) Ulises Blanch
- (Belgium) Joris De Loore
- (France) Arthur Fils
- (France) Maxime Janvier
- (Germany) Mats Rosenkranz
- (Czech Republic) Lukáš Rosol

== Champions ==
=== Singles ===
- (France) Grégoire Barrère def. (France) Quentin Halys 4–6, 6–3, 6–4.

=== Doubles ===
- (France) Nicolas Mahut / (France) Édouard Roger-Vasselin def. (Belgium) Michael Geerts / (Tunisia) Skander Mansouri 6–2, 6–4.
