= 2026 Orléans Open – Singles =

Singles
- 2026 Orléans Open

Final
- Champion: (Finland) Otto Virtanen
- Runner-up: (United States) Nishesh Basavareddy
- Score: 6–2, 6–3

Events
| Singles | Doubles |
- Orléans Open

Martín Landaluce was the defending champion but chose not to defend his title.

Otto Virtanen won the title after defeating Nishesh Basavareddy 6–2, 6–3 in the final.

== Seeds ==
1. (Argentina) Sebastián Báez (second round)
2. (Germany) Daniel Altmaier (semifinals)
3. (Italy) Mattia Bellucci (second round)
4. (France) Kyrian Jacquet (second round)
5. (Croatia) Dino Prižmić (first round)
6. (France) Benjamin Bonzi (second round)
7. (Hungary) Zsombor Piros (quarterfinals)
8. (France) Hugo Gaston (first round)

== Draw ==
Key

- Q = Qualifier
- WC = Wild card
- LL = Lucky loser
- Alt = Alternate
- ITF = ITF entry
- PR = Protected ranking
- SR = Special ranking
- SE = Special exempt
- JE = Junior exempt
- JR = Junior Accelerator Programme entrant
- CO = College Accelerator Programme entrant
- NG = Next Gen Accelerator Program entrant
- w/o = Walkover
- r = Retired
- d = Defaulted

=== Finals ===
Semifinals
(Spain) Pedro Martínez | 2 | 2
(Finland) Otto Virtanen | 6 | 6
(United States) Nishesh Basavareddy | 6 | 6
2 | (Germany) Daniel Altmaier | 2 | 3

Final
(Finland) Otto Virtanen | 6 | 6
(United States) Nishesh Basavareddy | 2 | 3

=== Top half ===
First round
1/WC | (Argentina) S Báez | 3 | 6 | 6
(Estonia) D Glinka | 6 | 2 | 1
(Japan) S Mochizuki | 6 | 6^{5} | 2
Q | (France) C Hemery | 4 | 7^{7} | 6
(Austria) J Rodionov | 4 | 6 | 4
(Spain) P Martínez | 6 | 4 | 6
SE | (France) M Martineau | 3 | 7^{7} | 6
8 | (France) H Gaston | 6 | 6^{5} | 2
3 | (Italy) M Bellucci | 6 | 7^{7}
Q | (France) Cosme Rolland de Ravel | 1 | 6^{5}
NG | (Norway) N Budkov Kjær | 7^{7} | 5 | 3
WC | (France) S Gueymard Wayenburg | 6^{5} | 7 | 6
(Czech Republic) D Svrčina | 2 | 6 | 7^{8}
Alt | (Ukraine) V Sachko | 6 | 3 | 6^{6}
(Finland) O Virtanen | 6 | 2 | 7^{7}
5 | (Croatia) D Prižmić | 1 | 6 | 6^{2}

Second round
1/WC | (Argentina) S Báez | 4 | 5
Q | (France) C Hemery | 6 | 7
(Spain) P Martínez | 6 | 6
SE | (France) M Martineau | 3 | 2
3 | (Italy) M Bellucci | 6^{2} | 6 | 2
WC | (France) S Gueymard Wayenburg | 7^{7} | 3 | 6
(Czech Republic) D Svrčina | 3 | 5
(Finland) O Virtanen | 6 | 7

Quarterfinals
Q | (France) C Hemery | 3 | 6^{2}
(Spain) P Martínez | 6 | 7^{7}
WC | (France) S Gueymard Wayenburg | 2 | 4
(Finland) O Virtanen | 6 | 6

Semifinals
(Spain) P Martínez | 2 | 2
(Finland) O Virtanen | 6 | 6

=== Bottom half ===
First round
6 | (France) B Bonzi | 6 | 6
(Italy) A Pellegrino | 0 | 3
Alt | (Netherlands) M Houkes | 6 | 3 | 4
(Germany) T Gentzsch | 4 | 6 | 6
(United States) N Basavareddy | 6 | 6
WC | (France) P-H Herbert | 4 | 3
Q | (France) H Grenier | 3 | 6^{9}
4 | (France) K Jacquet | 6 | 7^{11}
7 | (Hungary) Z Piros | 7^{7} | 1 | 6
Q | (Italy) L Nardi | 6^{2} | 6 | 4
(France) C Tabur | 6 | 6^{4} | 6
(Austria) L Neumayer | 4 | 7^{7} | 3
Q | (Belgium) B Gadamauri | 4
(Serbia) D Lajović | 2^{r}
Q | (France) Adrien Gobat | 2 | 6 | 3
2 | (Germany) D Altmaier | 6 | 3 | 6

Second round
6 | (France) B Bonzi | 4 | 3
(Germany) T Gentzsch | 6 | 6
(United States) N Basavareddy | 3 | 6 | 7
4 | (France) K Jacquet | 6 | 2 | 5
7 | (Hungary) Z Piros | 2 | 7^{8} | 6
(France) C Tabur | 6 | 6^{6} | 3
Q | (Belgium) B Gadamauri | 6 | 5 | 1
2 | (Germany) D Altmaier | 3 | 7 | 6

Quarterfinals
(Germany) T Gentzsch | 4 | 3
(United States) N Basavareddy | 6 | 6
7 | (Hungary) Z Piros | 5 | 4
2 | (Germany) D Altmaier | 7 | 6

Semifinals
(United States) N Basavareddy | 6 | 6
2 | (Germany) D Altmaier | 2 | 3
