= 2013 Open d'Orléans – Singles =

Tennis tournament in France

Singles
- 2013 Open d'Orléans

Final
- Champion: (Czech Republic) Radek Štěpánek
- Runner-up: (Argentina) Leonardo Mayer
- Score: 6–3, 6–4

Events
Singles	Doubles
← 2012 ·	Open d'Orléans	· 2014 →

David Goffin was the defending champion, but chose not to compete.

Radek Štěpánek won the title, defeating Leonardo Mayer in the final, 6–3, 6–4.

== Seeds ==
1. (France) Benoît Paire (semifinals)
2. (France) Michaël Llodra (quarterfinals, withdrew)
3. (Czech Republic) Radek Štěpánek (champion)
4. (France) Kenny de Schepper (first round)
5. (France) Nicolas Mahut (second round)
6. (Czech Republic) Jiří Veselý (quarterfinals, retired)
7. (Ukraine) Sergiy Stakhovsky (first round)
8. (Argentina) Leonardo Mayer (final)

== Draw ==
=== Key ===
- Q = Qualifier
- WC = Wild card
- LL = Lucky loser
- Alt = Alternate
- ITF = ITF entry
- PR = Protected ranking
- SR = Special ranking
- SE = Special exempt
- JE = Junior exempt
- JR = Junior Accelerator Programme entrant
- CO = College Accelerator Programme entrant
- NG = Next Gen Accelerator Program entrant
- w/o = Walkover
- r = Retired
- d = Defaulted

=== Finals ===
Semifinals
1/WC	(France) Benoît Paire	4	4
8	(Argentina) Leonardo Mayer	6	6
3	(Czech Republic) Radek Štěpánek	7^{7}	6
WC	(France) Pierre-Hugues Herbert	6^{3}	1

Final
8	(Argentina) Leonardo Mayer	3	4
3	(Czech Republic) Radek Štěpánek	6	6

=== Top half ===
First round
1/WC	(France) B Paire	6	7^{7}
(Belgium) R Bemelmans	3	6^{3}
Q	(Germany) Stefan Seifert	6^{4}	2^{r}
Q	(Switzerland) S Ehrat	7^{7}	2
(Italy) F Cipolla	7	2	6
(Netherlands) J Huta Galung	5	6	2
(Russia) T Gabashvili	3	2
6	(Czech Republic) J Veselý	6	6
4	(France) K de Schepper	5	3
(Romania) M Copil	7	6
Q	(Switzerland) H Laaksonen	5	5
(Germany) M Bachinger	7	7
Q	(Switzerland) Y Marti	3	3
(France) J Ouanna	6	6
(Russia) K Kravchuk	4	3
8	(Argentina) L Mayer	6	6

Second round
1/WC	(France) B Paire	7	6
Q	(Switzerland) S Ehrat	5	3
(Italy) F Cipolla	7^{7}	2	6^{7}
6	(Czech Republic) J Veselý	6^{4}	6	7^{9}
(Romania) M Copil	6	4	4
(Germany) M Bachinger	4	6	6
(France) J Ouanna	4	1^{r}
8	(Argentina) L Mayer	6	2

Quarterfinals
1/WC	(France) B Paire	3	6	3
6	(Czech Republic) J Veselý	6	2	0^{r}
(Germany) M Bachinger	5	2
8	(Argentina) L Mayer	7	6

Semifinals
1/WC	(France) B Paire	4	4
8	(Argentina) L Mayer	6	6

=== Bottom half ===
First round
5	(France) N Mahut	7^{7}	6
(Czech Republic) J Mertl	6^{5}	2
(Ukraine) I Marchenko	6	6
(Lithuania) R Berankis	4	2
(France) M Gicquel	3	6	6
(Canada) F Dancevic	6	2	4
(Germany) D Brown	1	0
3	(Czech Republic) R Štěpánek	6	6
7	(Ukraine) S Stakhovsky	4	0
WC	(France) A Olivetti	6	6
WC	(France) P-H Herbert	6	0
(Belgium) X Malisse	1	0^{r}
(Germany) M Berrer	6	6
(Spain) A Menéndez-Maceiras	3	2
(Germany) J-L Struff	4	5
2/WC	(France) M Llodra	6	7

Second round
5	(France) N Mahut	3	2
(Ukraine) I Marchenko	6	6
(France) M Gicquel	6	1	1^{r}
3	(Czech Republic) R Štěpánek	4	6	2
WC	(France) A Olivetti	7^{8}	3	6^{8}
WC	(France) P-H Herbert	6^{6}	6	7^{10}
(Germany) M Berrer	3	6^{3}
2/WC	(France) M Llodra	6	7^{7}

Quarterfinals
(Ukraine) I Marchenko	3	2
3	(Czech Republic) R Štěpánek	6	6
WC	(France) P-H Herbert	w/o
2/WC	(France) M Llodra

Semifinals
3	(Czech Republic) R Štěpánek	7^{7}	6
WC	(France) P-H Herbert	6^{3}	1
