= 2023 Open d'Orléans – Singles =

Tennis tournament in France

Singles
- 2023 Open d'Orléans

Final
- Champion: (Czech Republic) Tomáš Macháč
- Runner-up: (United Kingdom) Jack Draper
- Score: 6–4, 4–6, 6–3

Events
Singles	Doubles
- Open d'Orléans

Grégoire Barrère was the defending champion but chose not to defend his title.

Tomáš Macháč won the title after defeating Jack Draper 6–4, 4–6, 6–3 in the final.

== Seeds ==
1. (France) Richard Gasquet (semifinals)
2. (France) Luca Van Assche (semifinals)
3. (France) Hugo Gaston (second round)
4. (France) Benjamin Bonzi (quarterfinals)
5. (Belgium) David Goffin (quarterfinals)
6. (Switzerland) Marc-Andrea Hüsler (first round)
7. (United States) Maxime Cressy (first round)
8. (United Kingdom) Jack Draper (final)

== Draw ==
Key

- Q = Qualifier
- WC = Wild card
- LL = Lucky loser
- Alt = Alternate
- ITF = ITF entry
- PR = Protected ranking
- SR = Special ranking
- SE = Special exempt
- JE = Junior exempt
- JR = Junior Accelerator Programme entrant
- CO = College Accelerator Programme entrant
- NG = Next Gen Accelerator Program entrant
- w/o = Walkover
- r = Retired
- d = Defaulted

=== Finals ===
Semifinals
1	(France) Richard Gasquet	4	1
(Czech Republic) Tomáš Macháč	6	6
8	(United Kingdom) Jack Draper	7	6
2/WC	(France) Luca Van Assche	5	3

Final
(Czech Republic) Tomáš Macháč	6	4	6
8	(United Kingdom) Jack Draper	4	6	3

=== Top half ===
First round
1	(France) R Gasquet	6	6
WC	(France) P-H Herbert	2	4
LL	(Sweden) E Ymer	6	6
(Czech Republic) J Menšík	3	2
Alt	(Canada) G Diallo	2	6	4
(Italy) G Zeppieri	6	2	6
Q	(United Kingdom) A Fery	6	6
6	(Switzerland) M-A Hüsler	2	3
4	(France) B Bonzi	7	6
Alt	(France) A Escoffier	5	3
WC	(France) K Jacquet	1	4
(France) B Paire	6	6
(France) C Lestienne	6	7^{7}
(Netherlands) J de Jong	3	6^{5}
(Czech Republic) T Macháč	7^{11}	6
7	(United States) M Cressy	6^{9}	4

Second round
1	(France) R Gasquet	7	3	6
LL	(Sweden) E Ymer	5	6	1
(Italy) G Zeppieri	4	6^{2}
Q	(United Kingdom) A Fery	6	7^{7}
4	(France) B Bonzi	6	4	6
(France) B Paire	3	6	4
(France) C Lestienne	2	6^{5}
(Czech Republic) T Macháč	6	7^{7}

Quarterfinals
1	(France) R Gasquet	7	4	6
Q	(United Kingdom) A Fery	5	6	3
4	(France) B Bonzi	6^{5}	1
(Czech Republic) T Macháč	7^{7}	6

Semifinals
1	(France) R Gasquet	4	1
(Czech Republic) T Macháč	6	6

=== Bottom half ===
First round
8	(United Kingdom) J Draper	6	6
(Moldova) R Albot	2	2
Q	(France) T Lamasine	2	6	7
Q	(Switzerland) R Bertola	6	3	5
Alt	(Netherlands) G Brouwer	7^{9}	4	7^{7}
Q	(France) M Bourgue	6^{7}	6	6^{5}
(Croatia) D Prižmić	4	6^{2}
3	(France) H Gaston	6	7^{7}
5	(Belgium) D Goffin	7	6
Q	(Italy) M Bellucci	5	4
(Finland) O Virtanen	6	6
Q	(France) L Poullain	3	4
(Italy) L Nardi	7^{7}	6
(France) H Grenier	6^{5}	3
(Slovakia) A Molčan	6	6^{2}	3
2/WC	(France) L Van Assche	1	7^{7}	6

Second round
8	(United Kingdom) J Draper	6	6
Q	(France) T Lamasine	4	4
Alt	(Netherlands) G Brouwer	6	3	7^{7}
3	(France) H Gaston	1	6	6^{5}
5	(Belgium) D Goffin	5	6	6
(Finland) O Virtanen	7	4	4
(Italy) L Nardi	6	6^{2}	1
2/WC	(France) L Van Assche	4	7^{7}	6

Quarterfinals
8	(United Kingdom) J Draper	6	6
Alt	(Netherlands) G Brouwer	1	4
5	(Belgium) D Goffin	4	3
2/WC	(France) L Van Assche	6	6

Semifinals
8	(United Kingdom) J Draper	7	6
2/WC	(France) L Van Assche	5	3
