= 2016 Open d'Orléans – Singles =

Tennis tournament in France

Singles
- 2016 Open d'Orléans

Final
- Champion: (France) Pierre-Hugues Herbert
- Runner-up: (Slovakia) Norbert Gombos
- Score: 7–5, 4–6, 6–3

Events
Singles	Doubles
← 2015 ·	Open d'Orléans	· 2017 →

Jan-Lennard Struff was the defending champion but lost in the first round to Daniil Medvedev.

Pierre-Hugues Herbert won the title after defeating Norbert Gombos 7–5, 4–6, 6–3 in the final.

== Seeds ==
1. (Ukraine) Illya Marchenko (first round)
2. (Germany) Dustin Brown (quarterfinals)
3. (France) Paul-Henri Mathieu (second round)
4. (Germany) Jan-Lennard Struff (first round)
5. (Slovakia) Lukáš Lacko (first round)
6. (Moldova) Radu Albot (first round)
7. (France) Pierre-Hugues Herbert (champion)
8. (Uzbekistan) Denis Istomin (first round)

== Draw ==
=== Key ===
- Q = Qualifier
- WC = Wild card
- LL = Lucky loser
- Alt = Alternate
- ITF = ITF entry
- PR = Protected ranking
- SR = Special ranking
- SE = Special exempt
- JE = Junior exempt
- JR = Junior Accelerator Programme entrant
- CO = College Accelerator Programme entrant
- NG = Next Gen Accelerator Program entrant
- w/o = Walkover
- r = Retired
- d = Defaulted

=== Finals ===
Semifinals
7	(France) Pierre-Hugues Herbert	7^{7}	6
(Germany) Daniel Brands	6^{1}	1
LL	(Russia) Andrey Rublev	4	2
SE	(Slovakia) Norbert Gombos	6	6

Final
7	(France) Pierre-Hugues Herbert	7	4	6
SE	(Slovakia) Norbert Gombos	5	6	3

=== Top half ===
First round
1	(Ukraine) I Marchenko	0	4
(Belgium) R Bemelmans	6	6
(France) V Millot	3	6	6
Q	(France) A Hoang	6	3	4
WC	(Spain) T Robredo	3	6	7
PR	(Poland) J Janowicz	6	3	5
WC	(France) A Sidorenko	3	4
7	(France) P-H Herbert	6	6
4	(Germany) J-L Struff	4	2
(Russia) D Medvedev	6	6
(Belgium) S Darcis	7^{7}	6
(Ukraine) S Stakhovsky	6^{3}	1
(France) K de Schepper	6^{3}	7	6^{1}
(Germany) P Gojowczyk	7^{7}	5	7^{7}
(Germany) D Brands	6	7^{9}
8	(Uzbekistan) D Istomin	2	6^{7}

Second round
(Belgium) R Bemelmans	6	6
(France) V Millot	4	4
WC	(Spain) T Robredo	6	6^{5}	4
7	(France) P-H Herbert	4	7^{7}	6
(Russia) D Medvedev	6	7
(Belgium) S Darcis	1	5
(Germany) P Gojowczyk	7	4	6^{2}
(Germany) D Brands	5	6	7^{7}

Quarterfinals
(Belgium) R Bemelmans	6^{3}	6^{10}
7	(France) P-H Herbert	7^{7}	7^{12}
(Russia) D Medvedev	2	6	4
(Germany) D Brands	6	3	6

Semifinals
7	(France) P-H Herbert	7^{7}	6
(Germany) D Brands	6^{1}	1

=== Bottom half ===
First round
5	(Slovakia) L Lacko	7^{11}	4	3
LL	(Russia) A Rublev	6^{9}	6	6
PR	(Austria) J Melzer	1	1
(Germany) T Kamke	6	6
(France) É Roger-Vasselin	1	4
(Switzerland) M Chiudinelli	6	6
Q	(Croatia) N Mektić	5	6	2
3	(France) P-H Mathieu	7	1	6
6	(Moldova) R Albot	6^{1}	2
SE	(Slovakia) N Gombos	7^{7}	6
(Bosnia and Herzegovina) M Bašić	6	2^{r}
Q	(France) H Nys	3	5
WC	(France) G Blancaneaux	2	2
Q	(Croatia) A Pavić	6	6
WC	(France) J Benneteau	6^{4}	4
2	(Germany) D Brown	7^{7}	6

Second round
LL	(Russia) A Rublev	6	1	6
(Germany) T Kamke	3	6	0
(Switzerland) M Chiudinelli	6	6
3	(France) P-H Mathieu	1	4
SE	(Slovakia) N Gombos	6	3	6
Q	(France) H Nys	4	6	3
Q	(Croatia) A Pavić	2	4
2	(Germany) D Brown	6	6

Quarterfinals
LL	(Russia) A Rublev	3	6	6
(Switzerland) M Chiudinelli	6	2	3
SE	(Slovakia) N Gombos	6	6
2	(Germany) D Brown	2	0

Semifinals
LL	(Russia) A Rublev	4	2
SE	(Slovakia) N Gombos	6	6
