= 2019 Open d'Orléans =

Tennis tournament in France

- Date: 23–29 September
- Edition: 15th
- Draw: 48S / 16D
- Surface: Hard
- Location: Orléans, France

Champions

Singles
- (Sweden) Mikael Ymer

Doubles
- (Monaco) Romain Arneodo / (Monaco) Hugo Nys
← 2018 ·	Open d'Orléans	· 2021 →

The 2019 Open d'Orléans was a professional tennis tournament played on indoor hard courts. It was the fifteenth edition of the tournament which was part of the 2019 ATP Challenger Tour. It took place in Orléans, France between 23 and 29 September 2019.

== Singles main-draw entrants ==
=== Seeds ===
Country	Player	Rank^{1}	Seed
FRA	Jo-Wilfried Tsonga	61	1
FRA	Ugo Humbert	65	2
SLO	Aljaž Bedene	76	3
ITA	Stefano Travaglia	80	4
ROU	Marius Copil	87	5
FRA	Corentin Moutet	96	6
FRA	Grégoire Barrère	98	7
SWE	Mikael Ymer	105	8
FRA	Antoine Hoang	109	9
TUN	Malek Jaziri	111	10
SVK	Norbert Gombos	117	11
RUS	Evgeny Donskoy	118	12
AUT	Dennis Novak	121	13
LAT	Ernests Gulbis	124	14
ITA	Jannik Sinner	127	15
GER	Yannick Maden	129	16

- ^{1} Rankings are as of 16 September 2019.

=== Other entrants ===
The following players received wildcards into the singles main draw:

- (France) Geoffrey Blancaneaux
- (France) Antoine Cornut-Chauvinc
- (France) Rayane Roumane
- (Italy) Luca Vanni
- (Sweden) Mikael Ymer

The following players received entry from the qualifying draw:

- (Norway) Viktor Durasovic
- (Monaco) Hugo Nys

== Champions ==
=== Singles ===
- (Sweden) Mikael Ymer def. (France) Grégoire Barrère 6–3, 7–5.

=== Doubles ===
- (Monaco) Romain Arneodo / (Monaco) Hugo Nys def. (Chile) Hans Podlipnik Castillo / (Austria) Tristan-Samuel Weissborn 6–7^{(5–7)}, 6–3, [10–1].
