= 2015 Open d'Orléans =

Tennis tournament in France

- Date: 28 September – 04 October
- Edition: 11th
- Draw: 32S / 16D
- Prize money: €106,500
- Surface: Hard
- Location: Orléans, France

Champions

Singles
- (Germany) Jan-Lennard Struff

Doubles
- (France) Tristan Lamasine / (France) Fabrice Martin
← 2014 ·	Open d'Orléans	· 2016 →

The 2015 Open d'Orléans was a professional tennis tournament played on hard courts. It was the eleventh edition of the tournament which was part of the 2015 ATP Challenger Tour. It took place in Orléans, France, between 28 September and 4 October 2015.

== Singles main-draw entrants ==
=== Seeds ===
Country	Player	Rank^{1}	Seed
UKR	Sergiy Stakhovsky	50	1
POL	Jerzy Janowicz	66	2
TUR	Marsel İlhan	84	3
FRA	Paul-Henri Mathieu	90	4
CRO	Ivan Dodig	105	5
SVK	Lukáš Lacko	112	6
SVK	Norbert Gombos	119	7
UKR	Illya Marchenko	123	8

- ^{1} Rankings are as of September 21, 2014.

=== Other entrants ===
The following players received wildcards into the singles main draw:

- (France) Grégoire Barrère
- (France) Enzo Couacaud
- (Spain) Jaume Munar
- (France) Alexandre Sidorenko

The following player received entry with a protected ranking:

- (Switzerland) Marco Chiudinelli

The following players received entry as a special exempt into the singles main draw:

- (Croatia) Franko Škugor

The following players received entry from the qualifying draw:

- (Croatia) Filip Veger
- (France) Maxime Tabatroung
- (France) Maxime Teixeira
- (Switzerland) Yann Marti

== Champions ==
=== Singles ===
- (Germany) Jan-Lennard Struff def. (Poland) Jerzy Janowicz, 5–7, 6–4, 6–3

=== Doubles ===
- (France) Tristan Lamasine / (France) Fabrice Martin def. (United Kingdom) Ken Skupski / (United Kingdom) Neal Skupski, 6–4, 7–5
