= 2011 Open d'Orléans – Singles =

Tennis tournament in France

Singles
- 2011 Open d'Orléans

Final
- Champion: (France) Michaël Llodra
- Runner-up: (France) Arnaud Clément
- Score: 7–5, 6–1

Events
Singles	Doubles
← 2010 ·	Open d'Orléans	· 2012 →

Nicolas Mahut was the defending champion, but lost to Dustin Brown in the second round.
Michaël Llodra won the title after defeating Arnaud Clément 7–5, 6–1 in the final.

== Seeds ==
1. (Spain) Feliciano López (first round)
2. (France) Michaël Llodra (champion)
3. (France) Nicolas Mahut (second round)
4. (Slovakia) Martin Kližan (first round)
5. (Belgium) Steve Darcis (withdrew due to low back pain)
6. (France) Stéphane Robert (second round)
7. (France) Édouard Roger-Vasselin (first round)
8. (France) Benoît Paire (first round)

== Draw ==
=== Key ===
- Q = Qualifier
- WC = Wild card
- LL = Lucky loser
- Alt = Alternate
- ITF = ITF entry
- PR = Protected ranking
- SR = Special ranking
- SE = Special exempt
- JE = Junior exempt
- JR = Junior Accelerator Programme entrant
- CO = College Accelerator Programme entrant
- NG = Next Gen Accelerator Program entrant
- w/o = Walkover
- r = Retired
- d = Defaulted

=== Finals ===
Semifinals
(France) Arnaud Clément	6	6
(Lithuania) Ričardas Berankis	3	4
(Germany) Andreas Beck	6^{4}	7	3
2/WC	(France) Michaël Llodra	7^{7}	5	6

Final
(France) Arnaud Clément	5	1
2/WC	(France) Michaël Llodra	7	6

=== Top half ===
First round
1/WC	(Spain) F López	4	5
(France) A Clément	6	7
(Czech Republic) J Hájek	6	6
LL	(Switzerland) Yann Marti	3	1
LL	(Spain) A Menéndez	6	5	6
(Slovakia) L Lacko	4	7	3
Q	(France) Laurent Rochette	3	2
6	(France) S Robert	6	6
4	(Slovakia) M Kližan	4	5
(France) A Gensse	6	7
WC	(France) V Millot	1	3
(Spain) E Bautista-Agut	6	6
(Lithuania) R Berankis	7^{7}	3	6
(Argentina) F Delbonis	6^{4}	6	4
(France) M Teixeira	7^{7}	2
7	(France) É Roger-Vasselin	6^{4}	3^{r}

Second round
(France) A Clément	6	6
(Czech Republic) J Hájek	4	3
LL	(Spain) A Menéndez	6	7
6	(France) S Robert	4	5
(France) A Gensse	6	6
(Spain) E Bautista-Agut	2	1
(Lithuania) R Berankis	6	6
(France) M Teixeira	3	4

Quarterfinals
(France) A Clément	6	6
LL	(Spain) A Menéndez	1	4
(France) A Gensse	1	6^{4}
(Lithuania) R Berankis	6	7^{7}

Semifinals
(France) A Clément	6	6
(Lithuania) R Berankis	3	4

=== Bottom half ===
First round
8/WC	(France) B Paire	4	6^{4}
(Germany) A Beck	6	7^{7}
(Belgium) R Bemelmans	6
LL	(France) Simon Cauvard	0	r
(Italy) S Vagnozzi	4	4
(Germany) D Brown	6	6
(Ukraine) S Bubka	5	4
3	(France) N Mahut	7	6
Q	(France) M Rodrigues	6	7
(France) D Guez	4	5
Q	(France) P-H Herbert	6	6
Q	(Latvia) A Juška	1	3
(France) K de Schepper	6	1	6^{8}
(Spain) A Brugués Davi	1	6	7^{10}
(Romania) A Ungur	2	3
2/WC	(France) M Llodra	6	6

Second round
(Germany) A Beck	6	7^{7}
(Belgium) R Bemelmans	2	6^{4}
(Germany) D Brown	6	6
3	(France) N Mahut	4	3
Q	(France) M Rodrigues	6	3	6
Q	(France) P-H Herbert	3	6	4
(Spain) A Brugués Davi	4	1
2/WC	(France) M Llodra	6	6

Quarterfinals
(Germany) A Beck	6	6
(Germany) D Brown	1	1
Q	(France) M Rodrigues	1	2
2/WC	(France) M Llodra	6	6

Semifinals
(Germany) A Beck	6^{4}	7	3
2/WC	(France) M Llodra	7^{7}	5	6
