= 2012 Open d'Orléans =

Tennis tournament in France

- Date: 24–30 September
- Edition: 8th
- Surface: Hard
- Location: Orléans, France

Champions

Singles
- (Belgium) David Goffin

Doubles
- (Czech Republic) Lukáš Dlouhý / (Luxembourg) Gilles Müller
← 2011 ·	Open d'Orléans	· 2013 →

The 2012 Open d'Orléans was a professional tennis tournament played on hard courts. It was the eighth edition of the tournament which was part of the 2012 ATP Challenger Tour. It took place in Orléans, France between 24 and 30 September 2012.

== Singles main-draw entrants ==
=== Seeds ===
Country	Player	Rank^{1}	Seed
GER	Philipp Kohlschreiber	18	1
BEL	David Goffin	56	2
BEL	Xavier Malisse	58	3
FRA	Nicolas Mahut	65	4
LUX	Gilles Müller	66	5
BEL	Steve Darcis	73	6
USA	Jesse Levine	78	7
ITA	Simone Bolelli	79	8

- ^{1} Rankings are as of September 17, 2012.

=== Other entrants ===
The following players received wildcards into the singles main draw:

- (Latvia) Ernests Gulbis
- (Germany) Philipp Kohlschreiber
- (France) Adrian Mannarino
- (France) Albano Olivetti

The following players received entry as a special exempt into the singles main draw:

- (United States) Steve Johnson
- (Russia) Dmitry Tursunov

The following players received entry from the qualifying draw:

- (France) Antoine Escoffier
- (Germany) Nils Langer
- (France) Fabrice Martin
- (France) Nicolas Renavand

== Champions ==
=== Singles ===
- (Belgium) David Goffin def. (Belgium) Ruben Bemelmans, 6–4, 3–6, 6–3

=== Doubles ===
- (Czech Republic) Lukáš Dlouhý / (Luxembourg) Gilles Müller def. (Belgium) Xavier Malisse / (United Kingdom) Ken Skupski, 6–2, 6–7^{(5–7)}, [10–7]
