= 2016 Open d'Orléans – Doubles =

Tennis tournament in France

Doubles
- 2016 Open d'Orléans

Final
- Champions: (Croatia) Nikola Mektić (Croatia) Franko Škugor
- Runners-up: (Uruguay) Ariel Behar (Belarus) Andrei Vasilevski
- Score: 6–2, 7–5

Events
Singles	Doubles
← 2015 ·	Open d'Orléans	· 2017 →

Tristan Lamasine and Fabrice Martin were the defending champions but chose not to defend their title.

Nikola Mektić and Franko Škugor won the title after defeating Ariel Behar and Andrei Vasilevski 6–2, 7–5 in the final.

== Seeds ==
1. (New Zealand) Marcus Daniell / (Brazil) Marcelo Demoliner (quarterfinals)
2. (United Kingdom) Ken Skupski / (United Kingdom) Neal Skupski (first round)
3. (Netherlands) Sander Arends / (Netherlands) Wesley Koolhof (first round)
4. (Belarus) Aliaksandr Bury / (Austria) Tristan-Samuel Weissborn (quarterfinals)

== Draw ==
=== Key ===
- Q = Qualifier
- WC = Wild card
- LL = Lucky loser
- Alt = Alternate
- ITF = ITF entry
- PR = Protected ranking
- SR = Special ranking
- SE = Special exempt
- JE = Junior exempt
- JR = Junior Accelerator Programme entrant
- CO = College Accelerator Programme entrant
- NG = Next Gen Accelerator Program entrant
- w/o = Walkover
- r = Retired
- d = Defaulted

First round
1	(New Zealand) M Daniell (Brazil) M Demoliner	6^{4}	6	[10]
(Germany) G Kretschmer (Slovakia) I Zelenay	7^{7}	4	[4]
(Croatia) N Mektić (Croatia) F Škugor	3	6	[10]
(Moldova) R Albot (France) J Eysseric	6	2	[3]
3	(Netherlands) S Arends (Netherlands) W Koolhof	6^{3}	3
(Uzbekistan) D Istomin (Russia) D Medvedev	7^{7}	6
WC	(Germany) D Brands (Germany) F Moser	7^{8}	1	[10]
(Switzerland) M Chiudinelli (Slovakia) L Lacko	6^{6}	6	[7]
(Belarus) S Betov (Netherlands) M Middelkoop	6	3	[8]
(Uruguay) A Behar (Belarus) A Vasilevski	3	6	[10]
(Germany) D Brown (Germany) J-L Struff	1	6^{5}
4	(Belarus) A Bury (Austria) T-S Weissborn	6	7^{7}
(Poland) T Bednarek (Australia) R Junaid	6	6
WC	(France) G Jacq (France) F Reboul	1	4
WC	(Austria) J Knowle (Austria) J Melzer	6	6
2	(United Kingdom) K Skupski (United Kingdom) N Skupski	4	4

Quarterfinals
1	(New Zealand) M Daniell (Brazil) M Demoliner	6^{5}	7	[10]
(Croatia) N Mektić (Croatia) F Škugor	7^{7}	5	[12]
(Uzbekistan) D Istomin (Russia) D Medvedev	3	4
WC	(Germany) D Brands (Germany) F Moser	6	6
(Uruguay) A Behar (Belarus) A Vasilevski	6	3	[10]
4	(Belarus) A Bury (Austria) T-S Weissborn	2	6	[5]
(Poland) T Bednarek (Australia) R Junaid	2	3
WC	(Austria) J Knowle (Austria) J Melzer	6	6

Semifinals
(Croatia) N Mektić (Croatia) F Škugor	6	7
WC	(Germany) D Brands (Germany) F Moser	2	5
(Uruguay) A Behar (Belarus) A Vasilevski	6	1	[10]
WC	(Austria) J Knowle (Austria) J Melzer	4	6	[6]

Final
(Croatia) N Mektić (Croatia) F Škugor	6	7
(Uruguay) A Behar (Belarus) A Vasilevski	2	5
