= 2026 Orléans Open – Doubles =

Doubles
- 2026 Orléans Open

Final
- Champions: (Switzerland) Jakub Paul (Czech Republic) Matěj Vocel
- Runners-up: Ivan Liutarevich (Poland) Filip Pieczonka
- Score: 7–6^{(7–4)}, 7–6^{(7–5)}

Events
Singles	Doubles
- Orléans Open

Clément Chidekh and Luca Sanchez were the defending champions but only Sanchez chose to defend his title, partnering Alexander Donski. They lost in the first round to Ivan Liutarevich and Filip Pieczonka.

Jakub Paul and Matěj Vocel won the title after defeating Liutarevich and Pieczonka 7–6^{(7–4)}, 7–6^{(7–5)} in the final.

== Seeds ==
1. (Monaco) Romain Arneodo / (United Kingdom) Marcus Willis (first round)
2. (Belgium) Sander Gillé / (Netherlands) Sem Verbeek (quarterfinals)
3. (Switzerland) Jakub Paul / (Czech Republic) Matěj Vocel (champions)
4. (Bulgaria) Alexander Donski / (France) Luca Sanchez (first round)

== Draw ==
Key

- Q = Qualifier
- WC = Wild card
- LL = Lucky loser
- Alt = Alternate
- ITF = ITF entry
- PR = Protected ranking
- SR = Special ranking
- SE = Special exempt
- JE = Junior exempt
- JR = Junior Accelerator Programme entrant
- CO = College Accelerator Programme entrant
- NG = Next Gen Accelerator Program entrant
- w/o = Walkover
- r = Retired
- d = Defaulted

First round
1	(Monaco) R Arneodo (United Kingdom) M Willis	7^{8}	6^{0}	[8]
(Ecuador) G Escobar (India) N Kaliyanda Poonacha	6^{6}	7^{7}	[10]
(Spain) Í Cervantes (Spain) P Martínez	6	6
WC	(France) Robin Catry (Ukraine) Vadym Ursu	3	3
4	(Bulgaria) A Donski (France) L Sanchez	4	6^{5}
I Liutarevich (Poland) F Pieczonka	6	7^{7}
WC	(France) Maxence Beaugé (France) Adan Freire da Silva	1	6^{5}
(Israel) D Cukierman (Brazil) F Romboli	6	7^{7}
(Serbia) S Latinović (Ukraine) D Molchanov	7^{7}	7^{7}
(Slovakia) M Karol (Czech Republic) A Paulson	6^{3}	6^{5}
(United States) B Kittay (Japan) T Yuzuki	6^{5}	6	[12]
3	(Switzerland) J Paul (Czech Republic) M Vocel	7^{7}	4	[14]
(Uruguay) A Behar (United Kingdom) J Paris	7^{7}	6
(Croatia) A Kalender (Croatia) N Serdarušić	6^{1}	3
(Finland) P Niklas-Salminen (Czech Republic) M Vrbenský	1	4
2	(Belgium) S Gillé (Netherlands) S Verbeek	6	6

Quarterfinals
(Ecuador) G Escobar (India) N Kaliyanda Poonacha	3	6	[2]
(Spain) Í Cervantes (Spain) P Martínez	6	4	[10]
I Liutarevich (Poland) F Pieczonka	6	6
(Israel) D Cukierman (Brazil) F Romboli	4	2
(Serbia) S Latinović (Ukraine) D Molchanov	4	4
3	(Switzerland) J Paul (Czech Republic) M Vocel	6	6
(Uruguay) A Behar (United Kingdom) J Paris	5	6	[10]
2	(Belgium) S Gillé (Netherlands) S Verbeek	7	3	[7]

Semifinals
(Spain) Í Cervantes (Spain) P Martínez	4	6	[6]
I Liutarevich (Poland) F Pieczonka	6	3	[10]
3	(Switzerland) J Paul (Czech Republic) M Vocel	6	6
(Uruguay) A Behar (United Kingdom) J Paris	0	4

Final
I Liutarevich (Poland) F Pieczonka	6^{4}	6^{5}
3	(Switzerland) J Paul (Czech Republic) M Vocel	7^{7}	7^{7}
