= 2016 Open d'Orléans =

Tennis tournament in France

- Date: 26 September – 2 October
- Edition: 12th
- Draw: 32S / 16D
- Prize money: €106,500
- Surface: Hard
- Location: Orléans, France

Champions

Singles
- (France) Pierre-Hugues Herbert

Doubles
- (Croatia) Nikola Mektić / (Croatia) Franko Škugor
| ← 2015 · | Open d'Orléans | · 2017 → |

The 2016 Open d'Orléans was a professional tennis tournament played on indoor hard courts. It was the twelfth edition of the tournament which was part of the 2016 ATP Challenger Tour. It took place in Orléans, France between 26 September and 2 October 2016.

== Singles main-draw entrants ==
=== Seeds ===
| Country | Player | Rank^{1} | Seed |
|---|---|---|---|
| UKR | Illya Marchenko | 50 | 1 |
| GER | Dustin Brown | 68 | 2 |
| FRA | Paul-Henri Mathieu | 69 | 3 |
| GER | Jan-Lennard Struff | 87 | 4 |
| SVK | Lukáš Lacko | 100 | 5 |
| MDA | Radu Albot | 101 | 6 |
| FRA | Pierre-Hugues Herbert | 108 | 7 |
| UZB | Denis Istomin | 109 | 8 |

- ^{1} Rankings are as of September 19, 2016.

=== Other entrants ===
The following players received wildcards into the singles main draw:

- (France) Julien Benneteau
- (France) Geoffrey Blancaneaux
- (Spain) Tommy Robredo
- (France) Alexandre Sidorenko

The following player received entry as a special exempt into the singles main draw:

- (Slovakia) Norbert Gombos

The following players received entry with a protected ranking into the singles main draw:

- (Poland) Jerzy Janowicz
- (Austria) Jürgen Melzer

The following players received entry from the qualifying draw:

- (France) Antoine Hoang
- (Croatia) Nikola Mektić
- (France) Hugo Nys
- (Croatia) Ante Pavić

The following player received entry as a lucky loser:

- (Russia) Andrey Rublev

== Champions ==
=== Singles ===
- (France) Pierre-Hugues Herbert def. (Slovakia) Norbert Gombos, 7–5, 4–6, 6–3.

=== Doubles ===
- (Croatia) Nikola Mektić / (Croatia) Franko Škugor def. (Uruguay) Ariel Behar / (Belarus) Andrei Vasilevski, 6–2, 7–5.
