= 2017 Open d'Orléans =

Tennis tournament in France

- Date: 25 September – 1 October
- Edition: 13th
- Draw: 32S / 16D
- Surface: Hard
- Location: Orléans, France

Champions

Singles
- (Slovakia) Norbert Gombos

Doubles
- (Argentina) Guillermo Durán / (Argentina) Andrés Molteni
← 2016 ·	Open d'Orléans	· 2018 →

The 2017 Open d'Orléans was a professional tennis tournament played on indoor hard courts. It was the thirteenth edition of the tournament which was part of the 2017 ATP Challenger Tour. It took place in Orléans, France between 25 September and 1 October 2017.

== Singles main-draw entrants ==
=== Seeds ===
Country	Player	Rank^{1}	Seed
ARG	Horacio Zeballos	65	1
FRA	Pierre-Hugues Herbert	67	2
KAZ	Mikhail Kukushkin	78	3
SVK	Norbert Gombos	84	4
RUS	Andrey Kuznetsov	87	5
FRA	Julien Benneteau	94	6
KAZ	Alexander Bublik	96	7
FRA	Nicolas Mahut	107	8

- ^{1} Rankings are as of 18 September 2017.

=== Other entrants ===
The following players received wildcards into the singles main draw:

- (France) Geoffrey Blancaneaux
- (France) Benjamin Bonzi
- (Latvia) Ernests Gulbis
- (France) Paul-Henri Mathieu

The following player received entry into the singles main draw using a protected ranking:

- (Netherlands) Igor Sijsling

The following players received entry into the singles main draw as special exempts:

- (Serbia) Danilo Petrović
- (France) Stéphane Robert

The following players received entry from the qualifying draw:

- (Argentina) Guillermo Durán
- (France) Fabien Reboul
- (France) Gleb Sakharov
- (Croatia) Antonio Šančić

The following player received entry as a lucky loser:

- (France) Corentin Denolly

== Champions ==
=== Singles ===
- (Slovakia) Norbert Gombos def. (France) Julien Benneteau 6–3, 5–7, 6–2.

=== Doubles ===
- (Argentina) Guillermo Durán / (Argentina) Andrés Molteni def. (France) Jonathan Eysseric / (France) Tristan Lamasine 6–3, 6–7^{(4–7)}, [13–11].
