= 2026 Orléans Open =

- Date: 9 – 15 November
- Edition: 21st
- Surface: Hard (indoor)
- Location: Orléans, France

Champions

Singles
- (Finland) Otto Virtanen

Doubles
- (Switzerland) Jakub Paul / (Czech Republic) Matěj Vocel
- Orléans Open

The 2026 CO'Met Orléans Open was a professional tennis tournament played on indoor hardcourts. It was the 21st edition of the tournament which was part of the 2026 ATP Challenger Tour. It took place in Orléans, France between 9 and 15 November 2026.

== Singles main-draw entrants ==
=== Seeds ===
Country	Player	Rank^{1}	Seed
ARG	Sebastián Báez	52	1
GER	Daniel Altmaier	63	2
ITA	Mattia Bellucci	66	3
FRA	Kyrian Jacquet	80	4
CRO	Dino Prižmić	92	5
FRA	Benjamin Bonzi	95	6
HUN	Zsombor Piros	101	7
FRA	Hugo Gaston	109	8

- ^{1} Rankings are as of 2 November 2026.

=== Other entrants ===
The following players received wildcards into the singles main draw:

- (Argentina) Sebastián Báez
- (France) Sascha Gueymard Wayenburg
- (France) Pierre-Hugues Herbert

The following player received entry into the singles main draw as a special exempt:

- (France) Matteo Martineau

The following player received entry into the singles main draw through the Next Gen Accelerator programme:

- (Norway) Nicolai Budkov Kjær

The following players received entry into the singles main draw as alternates:

- (Netherlands) Max Houkes
- (Ukraine) Vitaliy Sachko

The following players received entry from the qualifying draw:

- (Belgium) Buvaysar Gadamauri
- (France) Adrien Gobat
- (France) Hugo Grenier
- (France) Calvin Hemery
- (Italy) Luca Nardi
- (France) Cosme Rolland de Ravel

== Champions ==
=== Singles ===
- (Finland) Otto Virtanen def. (United States) Nishesh Basavareddy 6–2, 6–3.

=== Doubles ===
- (Switzerland) Jakub Paul / (Czech Republic) Matěj Vocel def. Ivan Liutarevich / (Poland) Filip Pieczonka 7–6^{(7–4)}, 7–6^{(7–5)}.
