= 2013 Open d'Orléans =

Tennis tournament in France

- Date: 23–29 September
- Edition: 9th
- Surface: Hard
- Location: Orléans, France

Champions

Singles
- (Czech Republic) Radek Štěpánek

Doubles
- (Ukraine) Illya Marchenko / (Ukraine) Sergiy Stakhovsky
← 2012 ·	Open d'Orléans	· 2014 →

The 2013 Open d'Orléans was a professional tennis tournament played on hard courts. It was the ninth edition of the tournament which was part of the 2013 ATP Challenger Tour. It took place in Orléans, France between 23 and 29 September 2013.

== Singles main-draw entrants ==
=== Seeds ===
Country	Player	Rank^{1}	Seed
FRA	Benoît Paire	29	1
FRA	Michaël Llodra	49	2
CZE	Radek Štěpánek	51	3
FRA	Kenny de Schepper	69	4
FRA	Nicolas Mahut	79	5
CZE	Jiří Veselý	81	6
UKR	Sergiy Stakhovsky	92	7
ARG	Leonardo Mayer	93	8

- ^{1} Rankings are as of September 16, 2013.

=== Other entrants ===
The following players received wildcards into the singles main draw:

- (France) Benoît Paire
- (France) Michaël Llodra
- (France) Albano Olivetti
- (France) Pierre-Hugues Herbert

The following players received entry from the qualifying draw:

- (Switzerland) Sandro Ehrat
- (Switzerland) Henri Laaksonen
- (Germany) Stefan Seifert
- (Switzerland) Yann Marti

== Champions ==
=== Singles ===
- (Czech Republic) Radek Štěpánek def. (Argentina) Leonardo Mayer 6–3, 6–4

=== Doubles ===
- (Ukraine) Illya Marchenko / (Ukraine) Sergiy Stakhovsky def. (Lithuania) Ričardas Berankis / (Croatia) Franko Škugor 7–5, 6–3
