= 2021 Open d'Orléans =

Tennis tournament in France

- Date: 27 September – 3 October
- Edition: 16th
- Surface: Hard (Indoor)
- Location: Orléans, France

Champions

Singles
- (Switzerland) Henri Laaksonen

Doubles
- (France) Pierre-Hugues Herbert / (France) Albano Olivetti
← 2019 ·	Open d'Orléans	· 2022 →

The 2021 Open d'Orléans was a professional tennis tournament that played on indoor hard courts. It was the sixteenth edition of the tournament which was part of the 2021 ATP Challenger Tour. It took place in Orléans, France between 27 September and 3 October 2021.

== Singles main-draw entrants ==
=== Seeds ===
Country	Player	Rank^{1}	Seed
FRA	Ugo Humbert	26	1
FRA	Benjamin Bonzi	61	2
FRA	Arthur Rinderknech	74	3
FRA	Richard Gasquet	81	4
CZE	Jiří Veselý	88	5
FRA	Corentin Moutet	91	6
FRA	Gilles Simon	99	7
FRA	Pierre-Hugues Herbert	100	8

- ^{1} Rankings are as of 20 September 2021.

=== Other entrants ===
The following players received wildcards into the singles main draw:

- (France) Ugo Humbert
- (France) Harold Mayot
- (France) Corentin Moutet

The following player received entry into the singles main draw as an alternate:

- (Belgium) Ruben Bemelmans

The following players received entry from the qualifying draw:

- (France) Kyrian Jacquet
- (Russia) Evgeny Karlovskiy
- (Canada) Brayden Schnur
- (Italy) Matteo Viola

The following player received entry as a lucky loser:

- (France) Hugo Grenier

== Champions ==
=== Singles ===
- (Switzerland) Henri Laaksonen def. (Austria) Dennis Novak 6–1, 2–6, 6–2.

=== Doubles ===
- (France) Pierre-Hugues Herbert / (France) Albano Olivetti def. (France) Antoine Hoang / (France) Kyrian Jacquet 6–2, 2–6, [11–9].
