= 2018 Open d'Orléans – Singles =

Tennis tournament in France

Singles
- 2018 Open d'Orléans

Final
- Champion: (Slovenia) Aljaž Bedene
- Runner-up: (France) Antoine Hoang
- Score: 4–6, 6–1, 7–6^{(8–6)}

Events
Singles	Doubles
- Open d'Orléans

Norbert Gombos was the defending champion but lost in the first round to Luca Vanni.

Aljaž Bedene won the title after defeating Antoine Hoang 4–6, 6–1, 7–6^{(8–6)} in the final.

== Seeds ==
1. (France) Jo-Wilfried Tsonga (withdrew)
2. (Slovenia) Aljaž Bedene (champion)
3. (Spain) Jaume Munar (first round)
4. (Italy) Lorenzo Sonego (second round)
5. (France) Corentin Moutet (second round)
6. (France) Ugo Humbert (second round)
7. (Germany) Yannick Maden (first round)
8. (Estonia) Jürgen Zopp (first round)

== Draw ==
Key

- Q = Qualifier
- WC = Wild card
- LL = Lucky loser
- Alt = Alternate
- ITF = ITF entry
- PR = Protected ranking
- SR = Special ranking
- SE = Special exempt
- JE = Junior exempt
- JR = Junior Accelerator Programme entrant
- CO = College Accelerator Programme entrant
- NG = Next Gen Accelerator Program entrant
- w/o = Walkover
- r = Retired
- d = Defaulted

=== Finals ===
Semifinals
WC	(France) Antoine Hoang	6	7^{7}
(Italy) Luca Vanni	2	6^{5}
(France) Kenny de Schepper	1	6^{6}
2/WC	(Slovenia) Aljaž Bedene	6	7^{8}

Final
WC	(France) Antoine Hoang	6	1	6^{6}
2/WC	(Slovenia) Aljaž Bedene	4	6	7^{8}

=== Top half ===
First round
Q	(France) A Rinderknech	6	3	2
(France) G Barrère	2	6	6
WC	(France) A Hoang	6	2	6
WC	(France) Antoine Cornut-Chauvinc	4	6	2
(Germany) D Brands	6	6
(France) S Robert	4	4
LL	(France) M Janvier	4	7^{7}	4
6	(France) U Humbert	6	6^{4}	6
3	(Spain) J Munar	4	4
(Russia) A Vatutin	6	6
(Italy) L Vanni	3	6	7^{9}
(Slovakia) N Gombos	6	3	6^{7}
(Netherlands) T Griekspoor	6	6
(France) N Mahut	3	4
(Germany) O Otte	6^{3}	7^{7}	4
5	(France) C Moutet	7^{7}	6^{2}	6

Second round
(France) G Barrère	3	3
WC	(France) A Hoang	6	6
(Germany) D Brands	6	3	6
6	(France) U Humbert	2	6	3
(Russia) A Vatutin	3	4
(Italy) L Vanni	6	6
(Netherlands) T Griekspoor	6	6
5	(France) C Moutet	4	3

Quarterfinals
WC	(France) A Hoang	6	6
(Germany) D Brands	3	1
(Italy) L Vanni	6	6
(Netherlands) T Griekspoor	3	4

Semifinals
WC	(France) A Hoang	6	7^{7}
(Italy) L Vanni	2	6^{5}

=== Bottom half ===
First round
7	(Germany) Y Maden	0	4
(France) K de Schepper	6	6
Q	(Finland) E Ruusuvuori	6	6
(Czech Republic) Z Kolář	3	3
Q	(France) H Nys	2	6^{0}
(Sweden) E Ymer	6	7^{7}
LL	(Germany) Tobias Simon	3	7^{7}	3
4	(Italy) L Sonego	6	6^{5}	6
8	(Estonia) J Zopp	4	6	3
(France) Q Halys	6	1	6
Q	(France) TK Wang	5	6^{5}
WC	(Ukraine) S Stakhovsky	7	7^{7}
(France) C Lestienne	7^{10}	6
LL	(Netherlands) T van Rijthoven	6^{8}	1
(Spain) E López Pérez	3	4
2/WC	(Slovenia) A Bedene	6	6

Second round
(France) K de Schepper	6	7^{7}
Q	(Finland) E Ruusuvuori	4	6^{2}
(Sweden) E Ymer	7^{9}	6
4	(Italy) L Sonego	6^{7}	3
(France) Q Halys	5	6	6^{4}
WC	(Ukraine) S Stakhovsky	7	3	7^{7}
(France) C Lestienne	4	6	3
2/WC	(Slovenia) A Bedene	6	3	6

Quarterfinals
(France) K de Schepper	7^{7}	7
(Sweden) E Ymer	6^{3}	5
WC	(Ukraine) S Stakhovsky	6^{7}	4
2/WC	(Slovenia) A Bedene	7^{9}	6

Semifinals
(France) K de Schepper	1	6^{6}
2/WC	(Slovenia) A Bedene	6	7^{8}
