= 2018 Open d'Orléans =

Tennis tournament in France

- Date: 24–30 September
- Edition: 14th
- Draw: 32S / 16D
- Surface: Hard
- Location: Orléans, France

Champions

Singles
- (Slovenia) Aljaž Bedene

Doubles
- (United Kingdom) Luke Bambridge / (United Kingdom) Jonny O'Mara
← 2017 ·	Open d'Orléans	· 2019 →

The 2018 Open d'Orléans was a professional tennis tournament played on indoor hard courts. It was the fourteenth edition of the tournament which was part of the 2018 ATP Challenger Tour. It took place in Orléans, France between 24 and 30 September 2018.

== Singles main-draw entrants ==
=== Seeds ===
Country	Player	Rank^{1}	Seed
~~FRA~~	~~Jo-Wilfried Tsonga~~	~~71~~	~~1~~
SLO	Aljaž Bedene	76	2
ESP	Jaume Munar	82	3
ITA	Lorenzo Sonego	90	4
FRA	Corentin Moutet	105	5
FRA	Ugo Humbert	108	6
GER	Yannick Maden	120	7
EST	Jürgen Zopp	122	8

- ^{1} Rankings are as of 17 September 2018.

=== Other entrants ===
The following players received wildcards into the singles main draw:

- (Slovenia) Aljaž Bedene
- (France) Antoine Cornut-Chauvinc
- (France) Antoine Hoang
- (Ukraine) Sergiy Stakhovsky

The following players received entry from the qualifying draw:

- (France) Hugo Nys
- (France) Arthur Rinderknech
- (Finland) Emil Ruusuvuori
- (France) Tak Khunn Wang

The following players received entry as lucky losers:

- (France) Maxime Janvier
- (Netherlands) Tim van Rijthoven
- (Germany) Tobias Simon

== Champions ==
=== Singles ===
- (Slovenia) Aljaž Bedene def. (France) Antoine Hoang 4–6, 6–1, 7–6^{(8–6)}.

=== Doubles ===
- (United Kingdom) Luke Bambridge / (United Kingdom) Jonny O'Mara def. (Germany) Yannick Maden / (Austria) Tristan-Samuel Weissborn 6–2, 6–4.
