= 2011 Open d'Orléans =

Tennis tournament in France

- Date: 17–23 October
- Edition: 7th
- Surface: Hard
- Location: Orléans, France

Champions

Singles
- (France) Michaël Llodra

Doubles
- (France) Pierre-Hugues Herbert / (France) Nicolas Renavand
← 2010 ·	Open d'Orléans	· 2012 →

The 2011 Open d'Orléans was a professional tennis tournament played on hard courts. It was the seventh edition of the tournament which was part of the 2011 ATP Challenger Tour. It took place in Orléans, France between 17 and 23 October 2011.

== ATP entrants ==
=== Seeds ===
Country	Player	Rank^{1}	Seed
ESP	Feliciano López	28	1
FRA	Michaël Llodra	33	2
FRA	Nicolas Mahut	82	3
SVK	Martin Kližan	91	4
BEL	~~Steve Darcis~~	99	5
FRA	Stéphane Robert	105	6
FRA	Édouard Roger-Vasselin	107	7
FRA	Benoît Paire	111	8

- ^{1} Rankings are as of October 10, 2011.

=== Other entrants ===
The following players received wildcards into the singles main draw:

- (France) Michaël Llodra
- (Spain) Feliciano López
- (France) Benoît Paire
- (France) Vincent Millot

The following players received entry from the qualifying draw:

- (France) Pierre-Hugues Herbert
- (Latvia) Andis Juška
- (France) Mathieu Rodrigues
- (France) Laurent Rochette

The following players received entry as a lucky loser into the singles main draw:

- (France) Simon Cauvard
- (Switzerland) Yann Marti

== Champions ==
=== Singles ===
(France) Michaël Llodra def. (France) Arnaud Clément, 7–5, 6–1

=== Doubles ===
(France) Pierre-Hugues Herbert / (France) Nicolas Renavand def. (Czech Republic) David Škoch / (Italy) Simone Vagnozzi, 7–5, 6–3
