= 2014 Open d'Orléans =

Tennis tournament in France

- Date: 22–28 September
- Edition: 10th
- Surface: Hard
- Location: Orléans, France

Champions

Singles
- (Ukraine) Sergiy Stakhovsky

Doubles
- (Brazil) Thomaz Bellucci / (Brazil) André Sá
| ← 2013 · | Open d'Orléans | · 2015 → |

The 2014 Open d'Orléans was a professional tennis tournament played on hard courts. It was the tenth edition of the tournament which was part of the 2014 ATP Challenger Tour. It took place in Orléans, France between 22 and 28 September 2014.

== Singles main-draw entrants ==
=== Seeds ===
| Country | Player | Rank^{1} | Seed |
|---|---|---|---|
| GER | Philipp Kohlschreiber | 24 | 1 |
| NED | Igor Sijsling | 74 | 2 |
| CZE | Jiří Veselý | 78 | 3 |
| RUS | Andrey Kuznetsov | 81 | 4 |
| BRA | Thomaz Bellucci | 82 | 5 |
| UKR | Sergiy Stakhovsky | 90 | 6 |
| FRA | Paul-Henri Mathieu | 91 | 7 |
| FRA | Nicolas Mahut | 93 | 8 |

- ^{1} Rankings are as of September 15, 2014.

=== Other entrants ===
The following players received wildcards into the singles main draw:

- (Germany) Philipp Kohlschreiber
- (France) Tristan Lamasine
- (France) Enzo Couacaud
- (France) Laurent Lokoli

The following players received entry as an alternate into the singles main draw:

- (France) David Guez

The following players received entry from the qualifying draw:

- (France) Grégoire Barrère
- (Switzerland) Michael Lammer
- (Russia) Denis Matsukevich
- (New Zealand) Artem Sitak

== Champions ==
=== Singles ===
- (Ukraine) Sergiy Stakhovsky def. (Brazil) Thomaz Bellucci, 6–2, 7–5

=== Doubles ===
- (Brazil) Thomaz Bellucci / (Brazil) André Sá def. (United States) James Cerretani / (Sweden) Andreas Siljeström, 5–7, 6–4, [10–8]
