= 2023 Open d'Orléans =

- Date: 25 September – 1 October
- Edition: 18th
- Surface: Hard (Indoor)
- Location: Orléans, France

Champions

Singles
- (Czech Republic) Tomáš Macháč

Doubles
- (Germany) Constantin Frantzen / (Germany) Hendrik Jebens
- Open d'Orléans

The 2023 CO'Met Orléans Open was a professional tennis tournament played on indoor hard courts. It was the 18th edition of the tournament which was part of the 2023 ATP Challenger Tour. It took place in Orléans, France between 25 September and 1 October 2023.

== Singles main-draw entrants ==
=== Seeds ===
Country	Player	Rank^{1}	Seed
FRA	Richard Gasquet	65	1
FRA	Luca Van Assche	69	2
FRA	Hugo Gaston	91	3
FRA	Benjamin Bonzi	93	4
BEL	David Goffin	100	5
SUI	Marc-Andrea Hüsler	101	6
USA	Maxime Cressy	104	7
GBR	Jack Draper	105	8

- ^{1} Rankings are as of 18 September 2023.

=== Other entrants ===
The following players received wildcards into the singles main draw:

- (France) Pierre-Hugues Herbert
- (France) Kyrian Jacquet
- (France) Luca Van Assche

The following player received entry into the singles main draw as a special exempt:

- (Austria) ~~Dennis Novak~~

The following players received entry into the singles main draw as alternates:

- (Netherlands) Gijs Brouwer
- (Canada) Gabriel Diallo
- (France) Antoine Escoffier

The following players received entry from the qualifying draw:

- (Italy) Mattia Bellucci
- (Switzerland) Rémy Bertola
- (France) Mathias Bourgue
- (United Kingdom) Arthur Fery
- (France) Tristan Lamasine
- (France) Lucas Poullain

The following player received entry as a lucky loser:

- (Sweden) Elias Ymer

== Champions ==
=== Singles ===
- (Czech Republic) Tomáš Macháč def. (United Kingdom) Jack Draper 6–4, 4–6, 6–3.

=== Doubles ===
- (Germany) Constantin Frantzen / (Germany) Hendrik Jebens def. (United Kingdom) Henry Patten / (Australia) John-Patrick Smith 7–6^{(7–5)}, 7–6^{(14–12)}.
