= 2018 Open d'Orléans – Doubles =

Tennis tournament in France

Doubles
- 2018 Open d'Orléans

Final
- Champions: (United Kingdom) Luke Bambridge (United Kingdom) Jonny O'Mara
- Runners-up: (Germany) Yannick Maden (Austria) Tristan-Samuel Weissborn
- Score: 6–2, 6–4

Events
Singles	Doubles
- Open d'Orléans

Guillermo Durán and Andrés Molteni were the defending champions but chose not to defend his title.

Luke Bambridge and Jonny O'Mara won the title after defeating Yannick Maden and Tristan-Samuel Weissborn 6–2, 6–4 in the final.

== Seeds ==
1. (United Kingdom) Ken Skupski / (United Kingdom) Neal Skupski (semifinals)
2. (France) Hugo Nys / (Germany) Tim Pütz (quarterfinals)
3. (Netherlands) Sander Arends / (Monaco) Romain Arneodo (semifinals)
4. (United Kingdom) Luke Bambridge / (United Kingdom) Jonny O'Mara (champions)

== Draw ==
Key

- Q = Qualifier
- WC = Wild card
- LL = Lucky loser
- Alt = Alternate
- ITF = ITF entry
- PR = Protected ranking
- SR = Special ranking
- SE = Special exempt
- JE = Junior exempt
- JR = Junior Accelerator Programme entrant
- CO = College Accelerator Programme entrant
- NG = Next Gen Accelerator Program entrant
- w/o = Walkover
- r = Retired
- d = Defaulted

First round
1	(United Kingdom) K Skupski (United Kingdom) N Skupski	6	6
WC	(France) Tony Bourcet (France) S Robert	4	3
(Germany) A Begemann (France) J Eysseric	7^{7}	6
(Uruguay) A Behar (Spain) E López Pérez	6^{2}	4
4	(United Kingdom) L Bambridge (United Kingdom) J O'Mara	6	6
(Slovenia) A Bedene (Switzerland) L Margaroli	3	4
(Belgium) S Gillé (Belgium) J Vliegen	7	7^{7}
(Germany) A Mies (Croatia) A Šančić	5	6^{4}
(Portugal) G Oliveira (Italy) A Vavassori	7^{7}	6
(Spain) J Munar (Spain) D Vega Hernández	6^{4}	2
WC	(France) U Humbert (France) C Lestienne	4	4
3	(Netherlands) S Arends (Monaco) R Arneodo	6	6
(Germany) Y Maden (Austria) T-S Weissborn	3	6	[11]
(Australia) R Junaid (India) P Raja	6	3	[9]
WC	(Slovakia) F Polášek (Ukraine) S Stakhovsky	4	6	[3]
2	(France) H Nys (Germany) T Pütz	6	3	[10]

Quarterfinals
1	(United Kingdom) K Skupski (United Kingdom) N Skupski	6	6^{3}	[11]
(Germany) A Begemann (France) J Eysseric	4	7^{7}	[9]
4	(United Kingdom) L Bambridge (United Kingdom) J O'Mara	6	6
(Belgium) S Gillé (Belgium) J Vliegen	3	3
(Portugal) G Oliveira (Italy) A Vavassori	6^{3}	6^{5}
3	(Netherlands) S Arends (Monaco) R Arneodo	7^{7}	7^{7}
(Germany) Y Maden (Austria) T-S Weissborn	7^{7}	6
2	(France) H Nys (Germany) T Pütz	6^{4}	0

Semifinals
1	(United Kingdom) K Skupski (United Kingdom) N Skupski	7^{7}	3	[4]
4	(United Kingdom) L Bambridge (United Kingdom) J O'Mara	6^{1}	6	[10]
3	(Netherlands) S Arends (Monaco) R Arneodo	6	5	[7]
(Germany) Y Maden (Austria) T-S Weissborn	4	7	[10]

Final
4	(United Kingdom) L Bambridge (United Kingdom) J O'Mara	6	6
(Germany) Y Maden (Austria) T-S Weissborn	2	4
