= Nicolas Renavand =

French tennis player

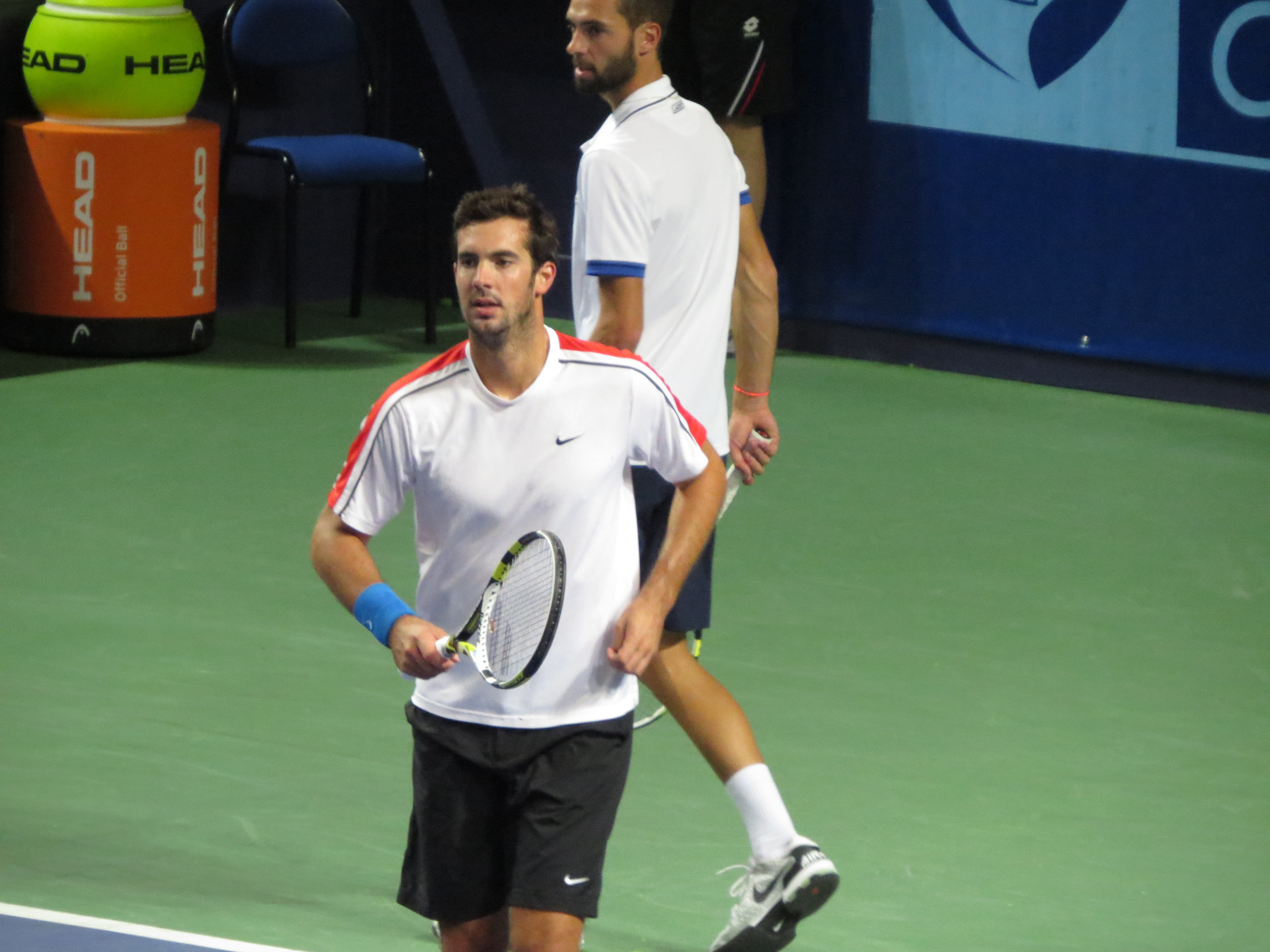
- Country (sports): France
- Born: 25 June 1982 (age 43) France
- Plays: Right-handed
- Prize money: US$213,884

Singles
- Career record: 0–0
- Career titles: 0
- Highest ranking: No. 225 (15 April 2013)

Grand Slam singles results
- French Open: Q2 (2004)

Doubles
- Career record: 0–1
- Career titles: 0
- Highest ranking: No. 118 (14 October 2013)

Grand Slam doubles results
- French Open: 1R (2005, 2011, 2012, 2013)

Nicolas Renavand (born 25 June 1982) is a French tennis player playing on the ATP Challenger Tour. He reached a career-high ATP singles ranking of World No. 225 achieved on 15 April 2013 and a doubles ranking of No. 128 was reached on 8 July 2013.

== Challenger finals ==
Legend
ATP Challenger Tour (3–4)

=== Doubles: 7 (3–4) ===
Outcome	No.	Date	Tournament	Surface	Partner	Opponents	Score
Loss	1.	27 February 2005	Cherbourg, France	Hard (i)	(France) Jean-Christophe Faurel	(Thailand) Sanchai Ratiwatana (Thailand) Sonchat Ratiwatana	3–6, 2–6
Loss	2.	21 May 2006	Zagreb, Croatia	Clay	(France) Julien Jeanpierre	(Switzerland) Yves Allegro (Slovakia) Michal Mertiňák	1–6, 2–6
Win	3.	26 August 2006	Bukhara, Uzbekistan	Hard	(France) Nicolas Tourte	(India) Rohan Bopanna (Pakistan) Aisam-ul-Haq Qureshi	2–6, 6–3, [10–8]
Loss	4.	2 August 2008	Graz, Austria	Clay	(France) Julien Jeanpierre	(Austria) Gerald Melzer (Austria) Jürgen Melzer	6–1, ^{8}6–7, [4–10]
Win	5.	24 October 2010	Orléans, France	Hard (i)	(France) Pierre-Hugues Herbert	(France) Sébastien Grosjean (France) Nicolas Mahut	7–6^{3}, 1–6, [10–6]
Loss	6.	11 September 2011	Saint-Rémy-de-Provence, France	Hard	(France) Arnaud Clément	(France) Pierre-Hugues Herbert (France) Édouard Roger-Vasselin	0–6, 6–4, [7–10]
Win	7.	23 October 2011	Orléans, France	Hard (i)	(France) Pierre-Hugues Herbert	(Czech Republic) David Škoch (Italy) Simone Vagnozzi	7–5, 6–3
