= Norbert Gombos =

Slovak tennis player

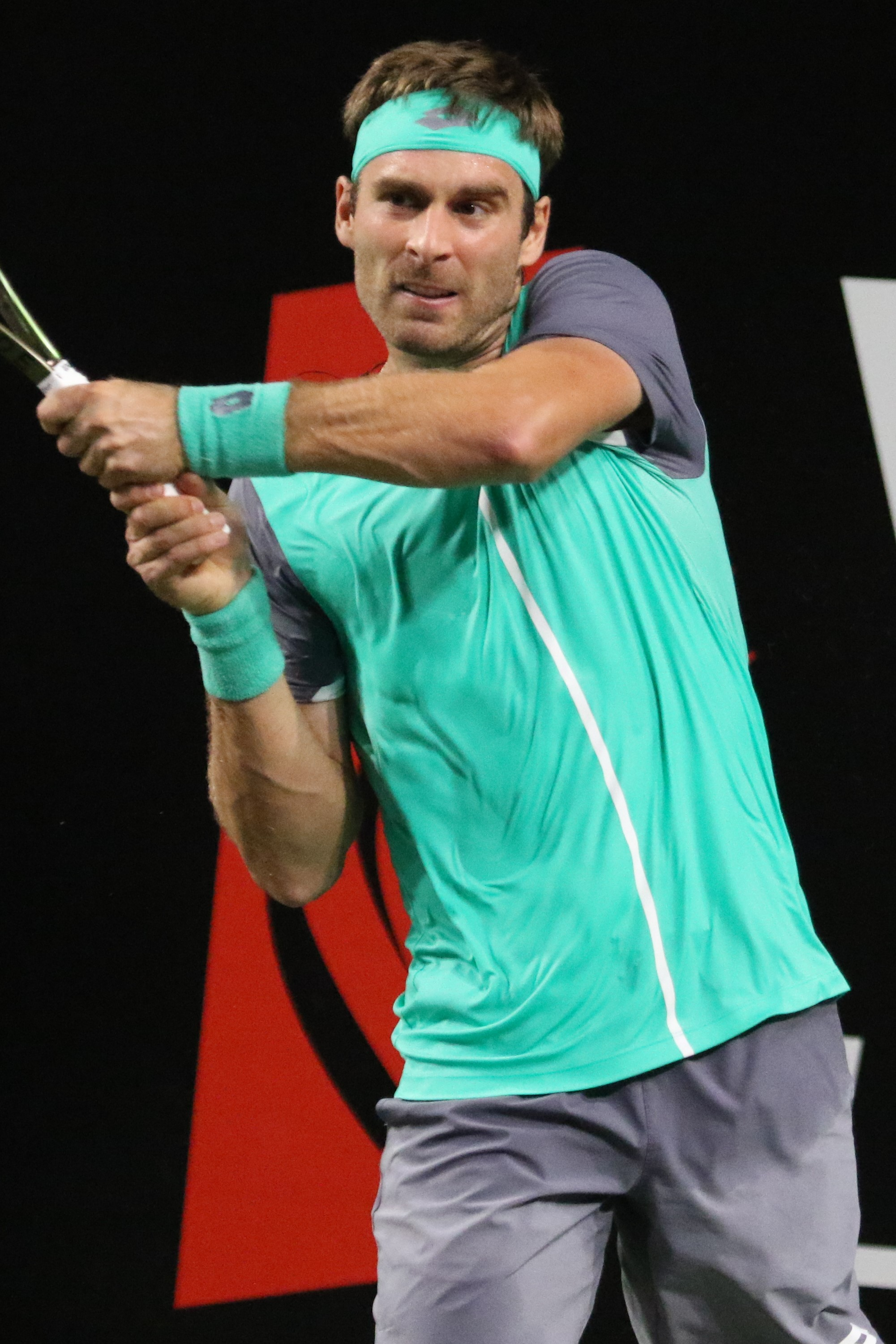
- Gombos at the 2022 Internationaux de Tennis de Vendée
- Country (sports): Slovakia
- Residence: Bratislava, Slovakia
- Born: 13 August 1990 (age 36) Galanta, Czechoslovakia
- Height: 1.93 m (6 ft 4 in)
- Turned pro: 2009
- Plays: Right-handed (two-handed backhand)
- Prize money: US$ 2,338,554

Singles
- Career record: 31–62
- Career titles: 0
- Highest ranking: No. 80 (2 October 2017)
- Current ranking: No. 366 (20 July 2026)

Grand Slam singles results
- Australian Open: 2R (2022)
- French Open: 3R (2020)
- Wimbledon: 1R (2017, 2018, 2021)
- US Open: 2R (2020)

Doubles
- Career record: 1–4
- Career titles: 0
- Highest ranking: No. 238 (19 October 2015)

Team competitions
- Davis Cup: Singles: 10–16; Doubles: 0–3
- Last updated on: 21 September 2026.

Norbert Gombos (Slovak pronunciation: [ˈnɔrberd ˈɡɔmbɔʂ], Hungarian: Gombos Norbert; born 13 August 1990, occasionally spelled Norbert Gomboš) is a Slovak professional tennis player competing primarily on the ATP Challenger Tour. He achieved a career-high ATP singles ranking of world No. 80 on 2 October 2017. He is currently the No. 3 Slovak tennis player in singles.

== Personal life ==
He is a member of the Hungarian community in Slovakia.

== Performance timeline ==
Key
W	F	SF	QF	#R	RR	Q#	DNQ	A	NH

(W) winner; (F) finalist; (SF) semifinalist; (QF) quarterfinalist; (#R) rounds 4, 3, 2, 1; (RR) round-robin stage; (Q#) qualification round; (DNQ) did not qualify; (A) absent; (NH) not held; (SR) strike rate (events won / competed); (W–L) win–loss record.
To avoid confusion and double counting, these charts are updated at the conclusion of a tournament or when the player's participation has ended.

=== Singles ===
Current through the 2022 Davis Cup.

Tournament	2013	2014	2015	2016	2017	2018	2019	2020	2021	2022	2023	SR	W–L	Win%
Grand Slam tournaments
Australian Open	A	Q2	Q1	Q2	Q1	Q2	A	1R	1R	2R	Q1	0 / 3	1–3	25%
French Open	A	Q1	Q2	Q1	Q3	Q1	Q1	3R	1R	1R	Q2	0 / 3	2–3	40%
Wimbledon	A	Q1	Q1	Q1	1R	1R	Q2	NH	1R	A	Q2	0 / 3	0–3	0%
US Open	A	Q1	Q2	A	1R	Q2	Q2	2R	1R	1R	Q1	0 / 4	1–4	20%
Win–loss	0–0	0–0	0–0	0–0	0–2	0–1	0–0	3–3	0–4	1–3	0–0	0 / 13	4–13	24%
ATP Masters 1000
Indian Wells	A	A	A	A	Q2	Q2	A	NH	A			0 / 0	0–0	–
Miami Open	A	A	Q2	A	Q2	Q1	A	NH	A			0 / 0	0–0	–
Monte-Carlo	A	A	1R	A	A	A	A	NH	A			0 / 1	0–1	0%
Canadian Open	A	A	A	A	1R	Q1	A	NH	Q1			0 / 1	0–1	0%
Cincinnati Masters	A	A	A	A	A	A	A	1R	Q1			0 / 1	0–1	0%
Paris Masters	A	A	A	A	Q1	A	A	3R	Q2			0 / 1	2–1	67%
Win–loss	0–0	0–0	0–1	0–0	0–1	0–0	0–0	2–2	0–0	0–0	0–0	0 / 4	2–4	33%
Career statistics
	2013	2014	2015	2016	2017	2018	2019	2020	2021	2022	2023	Career		
Tournaments	0	2	2	0	10	3	1	8	14	6		Career total: 46		
Titles	0	0	0	0	0	0	0	0	0	0		Career total: 0		
Finals	0	0	0	0	0	0	0	0	0	0		Career total: 0		
Overall win–loss	0–0	1–5	1–6	0–0	5–10	0–5	3–2	7–8	9–14	2–9	0–0	0 / 46	28–59	32%
Win %	–	17%	14%	–	33%	0%	60%	47%	39%	18%	–	Career total: 32%		
Year-end ranking	197	126	138	142	132	247	109	88	117	116	315	$2,230,532		

== Challenger and Futures finals ==
=== Singles: 28 (10–18) ===
Legend (singles) ATP Challenger Tour (7–11) ITF Futures Tour (3–7)	Titles by surface Hard (5–6) Clay (5–12) Grass (0–0) Carpet (0–0)

Result	W–L	Date	Tournament	Tier	Surface	Opponent	Score
Loss	0–1	Jul 2010	Austria F2, Kramsach	Futures	Clay	(Austria) Johannes Ager	2–6, 4–6
Loss	0–2	May 2011	Czech Republic F1, Teplice	Futures	Clay	(Czech Republic) Jiří Veselý	6–3, 6–7^{(7–9)}, 1–6
Win	1–2	Jul 2011	Austria F2, Kramsach	Futures	Clay	(Germany) Alexander Flock	6–4, 6–3
Loss	1–3	Feb 2012	China F4, Yuxi	Futures	Hard (i)	(France) Vincent Millot	5–7, 4–6
Loss	1–4	Jun 2012	Bosnia & Herzegovina F5, Kiseljak	Futures	Clay	(Bosnia and Herzegovina) Damir Džumhur	3–6, 6–7^{(3–7)}
Loss	1–5	Jul 2012	Czech Republic F5, Prague	Futures	Clay	(Czech Republic) Jiří Veselý	4–6, 0–6
Loss	1–6	Oct 2012	Turkey F39, Belek	Futures	Hard	(Bosnia and Herzegovina) Mirza Bašić	4–6, 4–6
Win	2–6	May 2013	Czech Republic F1, Most	Futures	Clay	(Austria) Dominic Thiem	4–6, 6–2, 6–2
Win	3–6	May 2013	Czech Republic F2, Teplice	Futures	Clay	(Czech Republic) Jaroslav Pospíšil	6–4, 6–2
Loss	3–7	Aug 2013	Italy F22, Este	Futures	Clay	(Austria) Dominic Thiem	1–6, 4–6
Loss	3–8	Mar 2014	Cherbourg, France	Challenger	Hard (i)	(France) Kenny de Schepper	6–3, 2–6, 3–6
Loss	3–9	Jun 2014	Vicenza, Italy	Challenger	Clay	(Serbia) Filip Krajinović	4–6, 4–6
Loss	3–10	Jun 2014	Prostějov, Czech Republic	Challenger	Clay	(Czech Republic) Jiří Veselý	2–6, 2–6
Loss	3–11	Jun 2014	Košice, Slovakia	Challenger	Clay	(Canada) Frank Dancevic	2–6, 6–3, 2–6
Win	4–11	Mar 2015	Cherbourg, France	Challenger	Hard (i)	(France) Benoît Paire	6–1, 7–6^{(7–4)}
Win	5–11	Jun 2015	Prague, Czech Republic	Challenger	Clay	(Spain) Albert Montañés	7–6^{(7–5)}, 5–7, 7–6^{(7–2)}
Loss	5–12	Oct 2016	Orléans, France	Challenger	Hard (i)	(France) Pierre-Hugues Herbert	5–7, 6–4, 3–6
Win	6–12	Oct 2016	Brest, France	Challenger	Hard (i)	(Belgium) Yannik Reuter	7–5, 6–2
Win	7–12	Nov 2016	Bratislava, Slovakia	Challenger	Hard (i)	(Romania) Marius Copil	7–6^{(10–8)}, 4–6, 6–3
Loss	7–13	May 2017	Heilbronn, Germany	Challenger	Clay	(Serbia) Filip Krajinović	3–6, 2–6
Win	8–13	Oct 2017	Orléans, France	Challenger	Hard (i)	(France) Julien Benneteau	6–3, 5–7, 6–3
Loss	8–14	Mar 2019	Pau, France	Challenger	Hard (i)	(Kazakhstan) Alexander Bublik	7–5, 3–6, 3–6
Win	9–14	Jun 2019	Bratislava, Slovakia	Challenger	Clay	(Hungary) Attila Balázs	6–3, 3–6, 6–2
Win	10–14	Jul 2019	Winnipeg, Canada	Challenger	Hard	(Canada) Brayden Schnur	7–6^{(7–3)}, 6–3
Loss	10–15	Oct 2021	Mouilleron-le-Captif, France	Challenger	Hard (i)	(Czech Republic) Jiří Veselý	4-6, 4-6
Loss	10–16	Apr 2022	Murcia, Spain	Challenger	Clay	(Chinese Taipei) Tseng Chun-hsin	4-6, 1-6
Loss	10–17	Jul 2022	Salzburg, Austria	Challenger	Clay	(Brazil) Thiago Monteiro	3–6, 6–7^{(2–7)}
Loss	10–18	Apr 2023	Split, Croatia	Challenger	Clay	(Hungary) Zsombor Piros	6–7^{(2–7)}, 6–7^{(9–11)}

=== Doubles: 5 (1–4) ===
Legend (doubles) ATP Challenger Tour (0–3) ITF Futures Tour (1–1)	Titles by surface Hard (0–1) Clay (1–3) Grass (0–0) Carpet (0–0)

Result	W–L	Date	Tournament	Tier	Surface	Partner	Opponents	Score
Win	1–0	Oct 2011	Hungary F3, Budapest	Futures	Clay	(Czech Republic) Roman Jebavý	(Austria) Mario Kargl (Austria) Lukas Weinhandl	6–2, 6–0
Loss	1–1	May 2013	Czech Republic F1, Most	Futures	Clay	(Slovakia) Patrik Fabian	(Czech Republic) Michal Franěk (Czech Republic) Jan Kunčík	6–4, 3–6, [2–10]
Loss	1–2	Aug 2013	Cordenons, Italy	Challenger	Clay	(Czech Republic) Roman Jebavý	(Croatia) Marin Draganja (Croatia) Franko Škugor	4–6, 4–6
Loss	1–3	Nov 2014	Bratislava, Slovakia	Challenger	Hard (i)	(Czech Republic) Adam Pavlásek	(United Kingdom) Ken Skupski (United Kingdom) Neal Skupski	3–6, 6–7^{(3–7)}
Loss	1–4	Jun 2015	Poprad-Tatry, Slovakia	Challenger	Clay	(Czech Republic) Adam Pavlásek	(Czech Republic) Roman Jebavý (Czech Republic) Jan Šátral	2–6, 2–6

== Record against top 10 players ==
Gombos' record against players who have been ranked in the top 10, with those who are active in boldface. Only ATP Tour main draw matches are considered:

Player	Record	Win %	Hard	Clay	Grass	Last match
Number 3 ranked players						
(Austria) Dominic Thiem	1–0	100%	1–0	–	–	Won (6–4, 3–6, 6–3, 6–4) at 2014 Davis Cup Qualifying RR
(Croatia) **Marin Čilić**	0–2	0%	0–2	–	–	Lost (2–6, 3–6, 6–3, 6–7^{(6–8)}) at 2022 Australian Open
Number 5 ranked players						
(South Africa) Kevin Anderson	0–1	0%	–	–	0–1	Lost (3–6, 4–6, 4–6) at 2018 Wimbledon Championships
(Russia) **Andrey Rublev**	0–1	0%	0–1	–	–	Lost (3–6, 2–6) at 2020 Vienna
Number 6 ranked players						
(France) Gaël Monfils	0–1	0%	0–1	–	–	Lost (3–6, 4–6) at 2020 Montpellier
Number 7 ranked players						
(Belgium) David Goffin	1–1	50%	1–0	0–1	–	Won (6–4, 7–6^{(8–6)}) at 2020 Paris Masters
Number 8 ranked players						
(Cyprus) Marcos Baghdatis	0–1	0%	0–1	–	–	Lost (3–6, 4–6) at 2017 Stockholm
(Argentina) Diego Schwartzman	0–1	0%	–	0–1	–	Lost (6–7^{(3–7)}, 3–6, 3–6) at 2020 French Open
(Italy) **Jannik Sinner**	0–1	0%	0–1	–	–	Lost (4–6, 6–7^{(5–7)}) at 2020 Marseilles
(United States) John Isner	0–1	0%	0–1	–	–	Lost (6–7^{(5–7)}, 4–6, 2–6) at 2014 Davis Cup Qualifying RR
Number 9 ranked players						
(Poland) **Hubert Hurkacz**	1–0	100%	1–0	–	–	Won (6–2, 6–2, 3–6, 6–4) at 2017 Davis Cup Qualifying RR
(Italy) Fabio Fognini	0–1	0%	–	0–1	–	Lost (6–1, 4–6, 3–6) at 2017 Gstaad
Number 10 ranked players						
(Spain) **Pablo Carreño Busta**	1–2	33%	1–1	0–1	–	Lost (3–6, 4–6, 3–6) at 2021 French Open
(Canada) **Félix Auger-Aliassime**	0–1	0%	–	0–1	–	Lost (3–6, 4–6) at 2019 Davis Cup Qualifying RR
Total	4–13	24%	4–7 (36%)	0–5 (0%)	0–1 (0%)	* Statistics correct as of 6 December 2021.
