= Open d'Orléans =

Orléans Open
- 2026 Orléans Open

ATP Challenger Tour
- Event name: CO'Met Orléans Open
- Location: Orléans, France
- Venue: L’Arena du CO'Met (Centre Orléans Métropole) (2023-present), Palais des Sports (2005-2022)
- Category: ATP Challenger Tour 125
- Surface: Hard (Indoor)
- Draw: 32S/32Q/16D
- Prize money: €148,625
- Website: cometorleansopen.com

The CO'Met Orléans Open is a tennis tournament part of the ATP Challenger Tour, played on indoor hardcourts. The event is held in Orléans, France, since 2005. Since 2023 it is held at l’Arena du CO'Met and known as the CO'Met Orléans Open.

== Past finals ==
=== Singles ===
| Year | Champion | Runner-up | Score |
|---|---|---|---|
| 2026 | (Finland) Otto Virtanen | (United States) Nishesh Basavareddy | 6–2, 6–3 |
| 2025 | (Spain) Martín Landaluce | (Belgium) Raphaël Collignon | 6–7^{(6–8)}, 6–2, 6–3 |
| 2024 | (United Kingdom) Jacob Fearnley | (France) Harold Mayot | 6–3, 7–6^{(7–5)} |
| 2023 | (Czech Republic) Tomáš Macháč | (United Kingdom) Jack Draper | 6–4, 4–6, 6–3 |
| 2022 | (France) Grégoire Barrère | (France) Quentin Halys | 4–6, 6–3, 6–4 |
| 2021 | (Switzerland) Henri Laaksonen | (Austria) Dennis Novak | 6–1, 2–6, 6–2 |
| 2020 | Not Held | | |
| 2019 | (Sweden) Mikael Ymer | (France) Grégoire Barrère | 6–3, 7–5 |
| 2018 | (Slovenia) Aljaž Bedene | (France) Antoine Hoang | 4–6, 6–1, 7–6^{(8–6)} |
| 2017 | (Slovakia) Norbert Gombos | (France) Julien Benneteau | 6–3, 5–7, 6–2 |
| 2016 | (France) Pierre-Hugues Herbert | (Slovakia) Norbert Gombos | 7–5, 4–6, 6–3 |
| 2015 | (Germany) Jan-Lennard Struff | (Poland) Jerzy Janowicz | 5–7, 6–4, 6–3 |
| 2014 | (Ukraine) Sergiy Stakhovsky | (Brazil) Thomaz Bellucci | 6–2, 7–5 |
| 2013 | (Czech Republic) Radek Štěpánek | (Argentina) Leonardo Mayer | 6–3, 6–4 |
| 2012 | (Belgium) David Goffin | (Belgium) Ruben Bemelmans | 6–4, 3–6, 6–3 |
| 2011 | (France) Michaël Llodra | (France) Arnaud Clément | 7–5, 6–1 |
| 2010 | (France) Nicolas Mahut | (Bulgaria) Grigor Dimitrov | 2–6, 7–6(6), 7–6(4) |
| 2009 | (Belgium) Xavier Malisse | (France) Stéphane Robert | 6–1, 6–2 |
| 2008 | (France) Nicolas Mahut | (Belgium) Christophe Rochus | 5–7, 6–1, 7–6(2) |
| 2007 | (Belgium) Olivier Rochus | (France) Nicolas Mahut | 6–4, 6–4 |
| 2006 | (Belgium) Olivier Rochus | (France) Michaël Llodra | 7–6(0), 7–6(6) |
| 2005 | (France) Cyril Saulnier | (France) Nicolas Mahut | 6–3, 6–4 |

=== Doubles ===
| Year | Champions | Runners-up | Score |
|---|---|---|---|
| 2026 | (Switzerland) Jakub Paul (Czech Republic) Matěj Vocel | Ivan Liutarevich (Poland) Filip Pieczonka | 7–6^{(7–4)}, 7–6^{(7–5)} |
| 2025 | (France) Clément Chidekh (France) Luca Sanchez | (France) Théo Arribagé (United Kingdom) Joshua Paris | 6–4, 6–2 |
| 2024 | (France) Benjamin Bonzi (France) Sascha Gueymard Wayenburg | (France) Manuel Guinard (France) Grégoire Jacq | 7–6^{(9–7)}, 4–6, [10–5] |
| 2023 | (Germany) Constantin Frantzen (Germany) Hendrik Jebens | (United Kingdom) Henry Patten (Australia) John-Patrick Smith | 7–6^{(7–5)}, 7–6^{(14–12)} |
| 2022 | (France) Nicolas Mahut (France) Édouard Roger-Vasselin | (Belgium) Michael Geerts (Tunisia) Skander Mansouri | 6–2, 6–4 |
| 2021 | (France) Pierre-Hugues Herbert (France) Albano Olivetti | (France) Antoine Hoang (France) Kyrian Jacquet | 6–2, 2–6, [11–9] |
| 2020 | Not Held | | |
| 2019 | (Monaco) Romain Arneodo (Monaco) Hugo Nys | (Chile) Hans Podlipnik Castillo (Austria) Tristan-Samuel Weissborn | 6–7^{(5–7)}, 6–3, [10–1] |
| 2018 | (United Kingdom) Luke Bambridge (United Kingdom) Jonny O'Mara | (Germany) Yannick Maden (Austria) Tristan-Samuel Weissborn | 6–2, 6–4 |
| 2017 | (Argentina) Guillermo Durán (Argentina) Andrés Molteni | (France) Jonathan Eysseric (France) Tristan Lamasine | 6–3, 6–7^{(4–7)}, [13–11] |
| 2016 | (Croatia) Nikola Mektić (Croatia) Franko Škugor | (Uruguay) Ariel Behar (Belarus) Andrei Vasilevski | 6–2, 7–5 |
| 2015 | (France) Tristan Lamasine (France) Fabrice Martin | (United Kingdom) Ken Skupski (United Kingdom) Neal Skupski | 6–4, 7–6^{(7–2)} |
| 2014 | (Brazil) Thomaz Bellucci (Brazil) André Sá | (United States) James Cerretani (Sweden) Andreas Siljeström | 5–7, 6–4, [10–8] |
| 2013 | (Ukraine) Illya Marchenko (Ukraine) Sergiy Stakhovsky | (Lithuania) Ričardas Berankis (Croatia) Franko Škugor | 7–5, 6–3 |
| 2012 | (Czech Republic) Lukáš Dlouhý (Luxembourg) Gilles Müller | (Belgium) Xavier Malisse (United Kingdom) Ken Skupski | 6–2, 6–7^{(5–7)}, [10–7] |
| 2011 | (France) Pierre-Hugues Herbert (France) Nicolas Renavand | (Czech Republic) David Škoch (Italy) Simone Vagnozzi | 7–5, 6–3 |
| 2010 | (France) Pierre-Hugues Herbert (France) Nicolas Renavand | (France) Sébastien Grosjean (France) Nicolas Mahut | 7–6(3), 1–6, [10–6] |
| 2009 | (United Kingdom) Colin Fleming (United Kingdom) Ken Skupski | (France) Sébastien Grosjean (France) Olivier Patience | 6–1, 6–1 |
| 2008 | (Ukraine) Sergiy Stakhovsky (Croatia) Lovro Zovko | (Switzerland) Jean-Claude Scherrer (Slovakia) Igor Zelenay | 7–6(7), 6–4 |
| 2007 | (United States) James Cerretani (Germany) Frank Moser | (Poland) Tomasz Bednarek (Poland) Michał Przysiężny | 6–1, 7–6(2) |
| 2006 | (France) Grégory Carraz (Belgium) Dick Norman | (France) Jérôme Haehnel (Monaco) Jean-René Lisnard | 7–6(6), 6–1 |
| 2005 | (France) Julien Benneteau (France) Nicolas Mahut | (France) Grégory Carraz (France) Antony Dupuis | 3–6, 6–4, 6–2 |
