= 2018 Davis Cup Europe/Africa Zone Group II =

International tennis competition

The Europe/Africa Zone was one of the three zones of the regional Davis Cup competition in 2018.

In the Europe/Africa Zone there were three different tiers, called groups, in which teams competed against each other to advance to the upper tier. Winners in Group II advanced to the Europe/Africa Zone Group I. Teams who lost their respective ties competed in the relegation play-offs, with winning teams remaining in Group II, whereas European and African teams who lost their play-offs were relegated respectively to the Europe and Africa Zone Group III in 2019.

== Participating nations ==
Seeds:

1. Romania
2. Lithuania
3. Denmark
4. Slovenia
5. Turkey
6. Norway
7. Finland
8. Georgia

Remaining nations:

- Egypt
- Estonia
- Ireland
- Luxembourg
- Morocco
- Poland
- Tunisia
- Zimbabwe

=== Draw ===
Relegation Play-offs
Esch-sur-Alzette, Lux. (indoor hard)
Luxembourg	5
8	Georgia	0
Portorož, Slovenia (clay)
4	Slovenia	3
5	Turkey	2
Oslo, Norway (indoor hard)
6	Norway	3
Ireland	1
Tallinn, Estonia (indoor hard)
Tunisia	2
Estonia	3

First Round
Piatra Neamț, Romania (indoor hard)
1	Romania	4
Luxembourg	1
Marrakesh, Morocco (clay)
8	Georgia	1
Morocco	3
Maribor, Slovenia (indoor hard)
4	Slovenia	2
Poland	3
Harare, Zimbabwe (hard)
5	Turkey	1
Zimbabwe	3
Sharm El Sheikh, Egypt (hard)
Egypt	4
6	Norway	0
Birkerød, Denmark (indoor hard)
Ireland	1
3	Denmark	4
Tunis, Tunisia (hard)
Tunisia	2
7	Finland	3
Šiauliai, Lithuania (indoor hard)
Estonia	1
2	Lithuania	3

Second Round
Cluj-Napoca, Romania (indoor hard)
1	Romania	5
Morocco	0
Sopot, Poland (indoor hard)
Poland	4
Zimbabwe	1
Gentofte, Denmark (indoor hard)
Egypt	3
3	Denmark	1
Helsinki, Finland (indoor hard)
7	Finland	3
2	Lithuania	2

Third Round
Cluj-Napoca, Romania (indoor clay)
1	Romania	2
Poland	3
Cairo, Egypt (clay)
Egypt	2
7	Finland	3

- Georgia, Turkey, Ireland, and Tunisia relegated to Group III in 2019.
- Poland and Finland promoted to Group I in 2019.

== First round ==
=== Romania vs. Luxembourg ===
Romania
4
Polyvalent Hall, Piatra Neamț, Romania
3–4 February
Hard (indoor)

Luxembourg
1

			1	2	3
1	(Romania) (Luxembourg)	Nicolae Frunză; Ugo Nastasi	6^{5} 7^{7}	6; 1	3; 6
2	(Romania) (Luxembourg)	Marius Copil; Christophe Tholl	6; 3	6; 2
3	(Romania) (Luxembourg)	Florin Mergea / Horia Tecău; Raphaël Calzi / Robi Tholl	6; 0	6; 1
4	(Romania) (Luxembourg)	Marius Copil; Ugo Nastasi	6; 1	6; 1
5	(Romania) (Luxembourg)	Bogdan Borza; Christophe Tholl	6; 3	6; 2

=== Morocco vs. Georgia ===
Morocco
3
Royal Tennis Club de Marrakech, Marrakesh, Morocco
3–4 February
Clay

Georgia
1

			1	2	3
1	(Morocco) (Georgia (country))	Lamine Ouahab; George Tsivadze	6; 3	6; 3
2	(Morocco) (Georgia (country))	Amine Ahouda; Nikoloz Basilashvili	3; 6	6; 3	6; 3
3	(Morocco) (Georgia (country))	Amine Ahouda / Lamine Ouahab; Nikoloz Basilashvili / Aleksandre Metreveli	6^{4} 7^{7}	6; 4	2; 6
4	(Morocco) (Georgia (country))	Lamine Ouahab; Nikoloz Basilashvili	6; 1	6; 3
5	(Morocco) (Georgia (country))	Amine Ahouda; George Tsivadze				not played

=== Slovenia vs. Poland ===
Slovenia
2
Lukna Sports Hall, Maribor, Slovenia
3–4 February
Hard (indoor)

Poland
3

			1	2	3
1	(Slovenia) (Poland)	Aljaž Bedene; Hubert Hurkacz	6; 4	7; 5
2	(Slovenia) (Poland)	Blaž Rola; Kamil Majchrzak	4; 6	2; 6
3	(Slovenia) (Poland)	Aljaž Bedene / Blaž Rola; Mateusz Kowalczyk / Marcin Matkowski	7; 5	6^{5} 7^{7}	4; 6
4	(Slovenia) (Poland)	Aljaž Bedene; Kamil Majchrzak	6; 3	6; 4
5	(Slovenia) (Poland)	Tom Kočevar-Dešman; Hubert Hurkacz	3; 6	2; 6

=== Zimbabwe vs. Turkey ===
Zimbabwe
3
Harare Sports Club, Harare, Zimbabwe
3–4 February
Hard

Turkey
1

			1	2	3
1	(Zimbabwe) (Turkey)	Benjamin Lock; Altuğ Çelikbilek	6; 4	1; 6	6; 3
2	(Zimbabwe) (Turkey)	Takanyi Garanganga; Cem İlkel	6; 4	7; 5
3	(Zimbabwe) (Turkey)	Takanyi Garanganga / Benjamin Lock; Tuna Altuna / Cem İlkel	7; 5	6; 3
4	(Zimbabwe) (Turkey)	Mehluli Don Ayanda Sibanda; Sarp Ağabigün	5; 7	4; 6
5	(Zimbabwe) (Turkey)	Takanyi Garanganga; Altuğ Çelikbilek				not played

=== Egypt vs. Norway ===
Egypt
4
Soho Square, Sharm El Sheikh, Egypt
3–4 February
Hard

Norway
0

			1	2	3
1	(Egypt) (Norway)	Mohamed Safwat; Simen Sunde Bratholm	6; 4	6; 1
2	(Egypt) (Norway)	Karim-Mohamed Maamoun; Viktor Durasovic	6; 0	6; 4
3	(Egypt) (Norway)	Youssef Hossam / Mohamed Safwat; Simen Sunde Bratholm / Viktor Durasovic	6; 4	6; 4
4	(Egypt) (Norway)	Youssef Hossam; Peter August Anker	6; 4	6; 0
5	(Egypt) (Norway)	Karim-Mohamed Maamoun; Simen Sunde Bratholm				not played

=== Denmark vs. Ireland ===
Denmark
4
Birkerød Idrætscenter, Birkerød, Denmark
3–4 February
Hard (indoor)

Ireland
1

			1	2	3
1	(Denmark) (Republic of Ireland)	Frederik Nielsen; Simon Carr	6; 3	7^{7} 6^{2}
2	(Denmark) (Republic of Ireland)	Søren Hess-Olesen; Peter Bothwell	7; 5	1; 6	3; 6
3	(Denmark) (Republic of Ireland)	Thomas Kromann / Frederik Nielsen; Samuel Bothwell / Osgar O'Hoisin	6; 4	6; 4
4	(Denmark) (Republic of Ireland)	Frederik Nielsen; Peter Bothwell	6; 1	6; 1
5	(Denmark) (Republic of Ireland)	Søren Hess-Olesen; Simon Carr	2; 6	6; 2	10; 8

=== Tunisia vs. Finland ===
Tunisia
2
Tennis Courts Cite Nationale Sportive El Menzah, Tunis, Tunisia
3–4 February
Hard

Finland
3

			1	2	3
1	(Tunisia) (Finland)	Malek Jaziri; Harri Heliövaara	6; 2	7; 5
2	(Tunisia) (Finland)	Aziz Dougaz; Emil Ruusuvuori	4; 6	1; 6
3	(Tunisia) (Finland)	Anis Ghorbel / Skander Mansouri; Harri Heliövaara / Henri Kontinen	4; 6	7; 5	2; 6
4	(Tunisia) (Finland)	Malek Jaziri; Emil Ruusuvuori	6; 0	6; 4
5	(Tunisia) (Finland)	Moez Echargui; Harri Heliövaara	6; 3	4; 6	4; 6

=== Lithuania vs. Estonia ===
Lithuania
3
Šiauliai Tennis School, Šiauliai, Lithuania
3–4 February
Hard (indoor)

Estonia
1

			1	2	3
1	(Lithuania) (Estonia)	Laurynas Grigelis; Jürgen Zopp	7; 5	6; 2
2	(Lithuania) (Estonia)	Ričardas Berankis; Kenneth Raisma	7; 5	7^{7} 6^{3}
3	(Lithuania) (Estonia)	Ričardas Berankis / Laurynas Grigelis; Kenneth Raisma / Mattias Siimar	2; 6	6; 4	7^{7} 6^{4}
4	(Lithuania) (Estonia)	Ainius Sabaliauskas; Jürgen Zopp	0; 6	1; 6
5	(Lithuania) (Estonia)	Laurynas Grigelis; Kenneth Raisma				not played

== Second round ==
=== Romania vs. Morocco ===
Romania
5
BT Arena, Cluj-Napoca, Romania
7–8 April
Hard (indoor)

Morocco
0

			1	2	3
1	(Romania) (Morocco)	Marius Copil; Amine Ahouda	6; 0	6; 1
2	(Romania) (Morocco)	Adrian Ungur; Lamine Ouahab	6; 0	7^{7} 6^{3}
3	(Romania) (Morocco)	Marius Copil / Florin Mergea; Yassine Idmbarek / Lamine Ouahab	6; 2	6; 1
4	(Romania) (Morocco)	Dragoș Dima; Soufiane El Mesbahi	6; 0	6; 4
5	(Romania) (Morocco)	Edris Fetisleam; Yassir Kilani	6; 2	6; 0

=== Poland vs. Zimbabwe ===
Poland
4
Hala Stulecia Sopotu, Sopot, Poland
7–8 April
Hard (indoor)

Zimbabwe
1

			1	2	3
1	(Poland) (Zimbabwe)	Kamil Majchrzak; Takanyi Garanganga	6; 2	6; 2
2	(Poland) (Zimbabwe)	Michał Przysiężny; Benjamin Lock	5; 7	5; 7
3	(Poland) (Zimbabwe)	Łukasz Kubot / Marcin Matkowski; Takanyi Garanganga / Benjamin Lock	6; 3	6; 3
4	(Poland) (Zimbabwe)	Kamil Majchrzak; Benjamin Lock	6; 3	6; 2
5	(Poland) (Zimbabwe)	Daniel Michalski; Mark Chigaazira	6; 3	6; 4

=== Denmark vs. Egypt ===
Denmark
1
Gentoftehallen, Gentofte, Denmark
7–8 April
Hard (indoor)

Egypt
3

			1	2	3
1	(Denmark) (Egypt)	Frederik Nielsen; Karim-Mohamed Maamoun	6; 3	3; 6	6^{6} 7^{8}
2	(Denmark) (Egypt)	Christoffer Konigsfeldt; Youssef Hossam	4; 6	4; 6
3	(Denmark) (Egypt)	Thomas Kromann / Frederik Nielsen; Youssef Hossam / Sherif Sabry	6; 3	5; 7	4; 6
4	(Denmark) (Egypt)	Holger Rune; Youssef Hossam	6; 2	7^{16} 6^{14}
5	(Denmark) (Egypt)	Christoffer Konigsfeldt; Karim-Mohamed Maamoun				not played

=== Finland vs. Lithuania ===
Finland
3
Tali Tennis Center, Helsinki, Finland
7–8 April
Hard (indoor)

Lithuania
2

			1	2	3
1	(Finland) (Lithuania)	Harri Heliövaara; Laurynas Grigelis	6; 3	1; 6	6; 3
2	(Finland) (Lithuania)	Emil Ruusuvuori; Ričardas Berankis	2; 6	7^{8} 6^{6}	3; 6
3	(Finland) (Lithuania)	Harri Heliövaara / Henri Kontinen; Laurynas Grigelis / Lukas Mugevičius	6; 4	7^{7} 6^{2}
4	(Finland) (Lithuania)	Harri Heliövaara; Ričardas Berankis	2; 6	3; 6
5	(Finland) (Lithuania)	Emil Ruusuvuori; Laurynas Grigelis	7; 5	6; 2

== Play-offs ==
=== Luxembourg vs. Georgia ===
Luxembourg
5
Centre National de Tennis, Esch-sur-Alzette, Luxembourg
7–8 April
Hard (indoor)

Georgia
0

			1	2	3
1	(Luxembourg) (Georgia (country))	Gilles Müller; Zura Tkemaladze	6; 3	6; 2
2	(Luxembourg) (Georgia (country))	Ugo Nastasi; George Tsivadze	3; 6	7; 5	6; 4
3	(Luxembourg) (Georgia (country))	Gilles Müller / Ugo Nastasi; Aleksandre Metreveli / George Tsivadze	6; 3	6; 1
4	(Luxembourg) (Georgia (country))	Alex Knaff; Vazha Shubladze	6; 1	6; 2
5	(Luxembourg) (Georgia (country))	Christophe Tholl; Zura Tkemaladze	6; 4	6; 4

=== Slovenia vs. Turkey ===
Slovenia
3
ŠRC Marina Portorož, Portorož, Slovenia
7–8 April
Clay

Turkey
2

			1	2	3
1	(Slovenia) (Turkey)	Mike Urbanija; Cem İlkel	2; 6	1; 6
2	(Slovenia) (Turkey)	Aljaž Bedene; Altuğ Çelikbilek	6; 4	6; 2
3	(Slovenia) (Turkey)	Aljaž Bedene / Tom Kočevar-Dešman; Cem İlkel / Anıl Yüksel	3; 6	6; 3	3; 6
4	(Slovenia) (Turkey)	Aljaž Bedene; Cem İlkel	7^{7} 6^{4}	6; 2
5	(Slovenia) (Turkey)	Nik Razboršek; Altuğ Çelikbilek	7; 5	6; 3

=== Norway vs. Ireland ===
Norway
3
Oslo Tennis Arena, Oslo, Norway
7–8 April
Hard (indoor)

Ireland
1

			1	2	3
1	(Norway) (Republic of Ireland)	Viktor Durasovic; Peter Bothwell	6; 3	2; 6	3; 6
2	(Norway) (Republic of Ireland)	Casper Ruud; Simon Carr	6; 2	6; 1
3	(Norway) (Republic of Ireland)	Viktor Durasovic / Casper Ruud; Peter Bothwell / Simon Carr	6; 2	6; 2
4	(Norway) (Republic of Ireland)	Casper Ruud; Peter Bothwell	6; 3	7; 5
5	(Norway) (Republic of Ireland)	Viktor Durasovic; Simon Carr				not played

=== Estonia vs. Tunisia ===
Estonia
3
Tere Tennisekeskus, Tallinn, Estonia
7–8 April
Hard (indoor)

Tunisia
2

			1	2	3
1	(Estonia) (Tunisia)	Kenneth Raisma; Malek Jaziri	4; 6	6^{9} 7^{11}
2	(Estonia) (Tunisia)	Jürgen Zopp; Moez Echargui	6; 1	6; 1
3	(Estonia) (Tunisia)	Kenneth Raisma / Jürgen Zopp; Moez Echargui / Malek Jaziri	6; 3	6; 4
4	(Estonia) (Tunisia)	Jürgen Zopp; Malek Jaziri	6; 1	6; 4
5	(Estonia) (Tunisia)	Kristjan Tamm; Aziz Ouakaa	4; 6	7; 5	[7] [10]

== Third round ==
=== Romania vs. Poland ===
Romania
2
Polyvalent Hall, Cluj-Napoca, Romania
15–16 September
Clay (i)

Poland
3

			1	2	3
1	(Romania) (Poland)	Marius Copil; Kamil Majchrzak	6; 2	6; 4
2	(Romania) (Poland)	Adrian Ungur; Hubert Hurkacz	6^{3} 7^{7}	5; 7
3	(Romania) (Poland)	Florin Mergea / Horia Tecău; Łukasz Kubot / Marcin Matkowski	7; 5	4; 6	6; 3
4	(Romania) (Poland)	Marius Copil; Hubert Hurkacz	3; 6	4; 6
5	(Romania) (Poland)	Adrian Ungur; Kamil Majchrzak	3; 6	2; 6

=== Egypt vs. Finland ===
Egypt
2
Gezira Sporting Club, Cairo, Egypt
14–15 September
Clay

Finland
3

			1	2	3
1	(Egypt) (Finland)	Mohamed Safwat; Emil Ruusuvuori	6; 4	7^{9} 6^{7}
2	(Egypt) (Finland)	Karim-Mohamed Maamoun; Harri Heliövaara	3; 6	2; 6
3	(Egypt) (Finland)	Sherif Sabry / Mohamed Safwat; Henri Kontinen / Patrik Niklas-Salminen	3; 6	4; 6
4	(Egypt) (Finland)	Mohamed Safwat; Harri Heliövaara	6; 2	6; 4
5	(Egypt) (Finland)	Karim-Mohamed Maamoun; Emil Ruusuvuori	1; 6	6; 3	1; 6
