= 2022 Open d'Orléans – Singles =

Tennis tournament in France

Singles
- 2022 Open d'Orléans

Final
- Champion: (France) Grégoire Barrère
- Runner-up: (France) Quentin Halys
- Score: 4–6, 6–3, 6–4

Events
Singles	Doubles
← 2021 ·	Open d'Orléans	· 2023 →

Henri Laaksonen was the defending champion but lost in the first round to Evan Furness.

Grégoire Barrère won the title after defeating Quentin Halys 4–6, 6–3, 6–4 in the final.

== Seeds ==
1. (France) Corentin Moutet (second round)
2. (France) Hugo Gaston (semifinals)
3. (France) Richard Gasquet (quarterfinals)
4. (France) Quentin Halys (final)
5. (Hungary) Márton Fucsovics (second round)
6. (Slovakia) Norbert Gombos (quarterfinals)
7. (Switzerland) Henri Laaksonen (first round)
8. (United States) Jack Sock (quarterfinals)

== Draw ==
=== Key ===
- Q = Qualifier
- WC = Wild card
- LL = Lucky loser
- Alt = Alternate
- ITF = ITF entry
- PR = Protected ranking
- SR = Special ranking
- SE = Special exempt
- JE = Junior exempt
- JR = Junior Accelerator Programme entrant
- CO = College Accelerator Programme entrant
- NG = Next Gen Accelerator Program entrant
- w/o = Walkover
- r = Retired
- d = Defaulted

=== Finals ===
Semifinals
SE	(Bulgaria) Adrian Andreev	6^{2}	4
4	(France) Quentin Halys	7^{7}	6
(France) Grégoire Barrère	6	6
2	(France) Hugo Gaston	4	3

Final
4	(France) Quentin Halys	6	3	4
(France) Grégoire Barrère	4	6	6

=== Top half ===
First round
1/WC	(France) C Moutet	7^{7}	7^{7}
(Belgium) M Geerts	6^{3}	6^{3}
(India) R Ramanathan	4	6	2
SE	(Bulgaria) A Andreev	6	1	6
Alt	(Tunisia) S Mansouri	4	2
Q	(France) A Fils	6	6
Q	(United States) U Blanch	6^{4}	6	4
6	(Slovakia) N Gombos	7^{7}	4	6
4	(France) Q Halys	6^{3}	6	6
SE	(Bosnia and Herzegovina) N Fatić	7^{7}	2	2
(Czech Republic) J Forejtek	4	7	6^{11}
(Netherlands) G Brouwer	6	5	7^{13}
(Austria) J Rodionov	6^{3}	6	7
Q	(Germany) M Rosenkranz	7^{7}	3	5
(France) E Furness	6	6
7	(Switzerland) H Laaksonen	2	0

Second round
1/WC	(France) C Moutet	6	6^{3}	6^{2}
SE	(Bulgaria) A Andreev	2	7^{7}	7^{7}
Q	(France) A Fils	6^{4}	1
6	(Slovakia) N Gombos	7^{7}	6
4	(France) Q Halys	6	1
(Netherlands) G Brouwer	3	0^{r}
(Austria) J Rodionov	6^{7}	6	6^{3}
(France) E Furness	7^{9}	3	7^{7}

Quarterfinals
SE	(Bulgaria) A Andreev	2	6	6
6	(Slovakia) N Gombos	6	2	2
4	(France) Q Halys	6	3	6
(France) E Furness	3	6	2

Semifinals
SE	(Bulgaria) A Andreev	6^{2}	4
4	(France) Q Halys	7^{7}	6

=== Bottom half ===
First round
5	(Hungary) M Fucsovics	6	7^{7}
(Switzerland) A Bellier	4	6^{4}
(Bosnia and Herzegovina) D Džumhur	1	2
(France) G Barrère	6	6
(Finland) O Virtanen	6^{3}	3
(France) L Lokoli	7^{7}	6
(Netherlands) J de Jong	2	5
3/WC	(France) R Gasquet	6	7
8	(United States) J Sock	3	6	6
WC	(France) H Mayot	6	3	2
Q	(Czech Republic) L Rosol	4
Q	(France) M Janvier	2^{r}
(France) A Escoffier	3	6^{3}
Q	(Belgium) J De Loore	6	7^{7}
(Germany) D Masur	0	6	2
2	(France) H Gaston	6	2	6

Second round
5	(Hungary) M Fucsovics	5	3
(France) G Barrère	7	6
(France) L Lokoli	4	4
3/WC	(France) R Gasquet	6	6
8	(United States) J Sock	6	6
Q	(Czech Republic) L Rosol	3	3
Q	(Belgium) J De Loore	6	3	1
2	(France) H Gaston	3	6	6

Quarterfinals
(France) G Barrère	1	6	6
3/WC	(France) R Gasquet	6	3	4
8	(United States) J Sock	2	3
2	(France) H Gaston	6	6

Semifinals
(France) G Barrère	6	6
2	(France) H Gaston	4	3
