= 2022 Open d'Orléans – Doubles =

Tennis tournament in France

Doubles
- 2022 Open d'Orléans

Final
- Champions: (France) Nicolas Mahut (France) Édouard Roger-Vasselin
- Runners-up: (Belgium) Michael Geerts (Tunisia) Skander Mansouri
- Score: 6–2, 6–4

Events
Singles	Doubles
← 2021 ·	Open d'Orléans	· 2023 →

Pierre-Hugues Herbert and Albano Olivetti were the defending champions but chose not to defend their title.

Nicolas Mahut and Édouard Roger-Vasselin won the title after defeating Michael Geerts and Skander Mansouri 6–2, 6–4 in the final.

== Seeds ==
1. (France) Nicolas Mahut / (France) Édouard Roger-Vasselin (champions)
2. (India) Purav Raja / (India) Divij Sharan (first round)
3. (United Kingdom) Luke Johnson / (United Kingdom) Jonny O'Mara (semifinals)
4. (Romania) Victor Vlad Cornea / (Czech Republic) Lukáš Rosol (first round)

== Draw ==
=== Key ===
- Q = Qualifier
- WC = Wild card
- LL = Lucky loser
- Alt = Alternate
- ITF = ITF entry
- PR = Protected ranking
- SR = Special ranking
- SE = Special exempt
- JE = Junior exempt
- JR = Junior Accelerator Programme entrant
- CO = College Accelerator Programme entrant
- NG = Next Gen Accelerator Program entrant
- w/o = Walkover
- r = Retired
- d = Defaulted

First round
1	(France) N Mahut (France) É Roger-Vasselin	6	6
(Netherlands) J de Jong (Ukraine) V Sachko	4	3
(France) T Arribagé (France) L Sanchez	7	3	[5]
(Poland) K Drzewiecki (Finland) P Niklas-Salminen	5	6	[10]
3	(United Kingdom) L Johnson (United Kingdom) J O'Mara	4	6	[11]
(Bosnia and Herzegovina) D Džumhur (India) R Ramanathan	6	0	[9]
WC	(France) T Lamasine (France) C Tabur	5	3
(Switzerland) A Bellier (Germany) D Masur	7	6
(Germany) H Jebens (Greece) Pe Tsitsipas	6	6
WC	(France) A Fils (France) H Mayot	4	4
(Norway) V Durasovic (Finland) O Virtanen	6	6
4	(Romania) VV Cornea (Czech Republic) L Rosol	4	2
(Switzerland) L Margaroli (Austria) M Neuchrist	5	6^{5}
Alt	(Belgium) M Geerts (Tunisia) S Mansouri	7	7^{7}
(France) A Escoffier (Czech Republic) J Forejtek	3	6	[10]
2	(India) P Raja (India) D Sharan	6	2	[5]

Quarterfinals
1	(France) N Mahut (France) É Roger-Vasselin	6	6
(Poland) K Drzewiecki (Finland) P Niklas-Salminen	2	4
3	(United Kingdom) L Johnson (United Kingdom) J O'Mara	4	6	[10]
(Switzerland) A Bellier (Germany) D Masur	6	4	[6]
(Germany) H Jebens (Greece) Pe Tsitsipas	6	6
(Norway) V Durasovic (Finland) O Virtanen	1	2
Alt	(Belgium) M Geerts (Tunisia) S Mansouri	6	6
(France) A Escoffier (Czech Republic) J Forejtek	3	4

Semifinals
1	(France) N Mahut (France) É Roger-Vasselin	6	6
3	(United Kingdom) L Johnson (United Kingdom) J O'Mara	3	3
(Germany) H Jebens (Greece) Pe Tsitsipas	5	5
Alt	(Belgium) M Geerts (Tunisia) S Mansouri	7	7

Final
1	(France) N Mahut (France) É Roger-Vasselin	6	6
Alt	(Belgium) M Geerts (Tunisia) S Mansouri	2	4
