= Kristjan Tamm =

Estonian tennis player

- Country (sports): Estonia
- Born: 16 June 1998 (age 28) Tartu, Estonia
- Height: 1.85 m (6 ft 1 in)
- Plays: Right-handed (two-handed backhand)
- Coach: Gianluca Carbone
- Prize money: US $70,001

Singles
- Career record: 2–6 (at ATP Tour level, Grand Slam level)
- Career titles: 0
- Highest ranking: No. 625 (21 December 2020)
- Current ranking: No. 1,138 (9 November 2026)

Doubles
- Career record: 0–0 (at ATP Tour level, Grand Slam level)
- Career titles: 0
- Highest ranking: No. 427 (10 November 2025)
- Current ranking: No. 623 (9 November 2026)

Team competitions
- Davis Cup: 2–3
- Last updated on: 9 November 2026.

Kristjan Tamm (born 16 June 1998) is an Estonian tennis player. He has a career high ATP singles ranking of No. 625 achieved on 21 December 2020 and a career high ATP doubles ranking of No. 427 achieved on 10 November 2025. Tamm has won 2 ITF titles.

Tamm has represented Estonia at Davis Cup. In Davis Cup he has a win–loss record of 2–2.

== Challenger and World Tennis Tour finals ==
=== Singles 4 (3–1) ===
Legend (doubles) ATP Challenger Tour (0–0) ITF World Tennis Tour (3–1)	Titles by surface Hard (3–1) Clay (0–0) Grass (0–0) Carpet (0–0)

Result	W–L	Date	Tournament	Tier	Surface	Opponent	Score
Win	1–0	Nov 2019	M15 Monastir, Tunisia	World Tennis Tour	Hard	(Italy) Andrea Guerrieri	6–3, 6–1
Win	2–0	Dec 2020	M15 Monastir, Tunisia	World Tennis Tour	Hard	(Russia) Artem Dubrivnyy	4–6, 6–3, 6–3
Loss	2–1	Nov 2022	M15 Al Zahra, Kuwait	World Tennis Tour	Hard	(Turkey) Yankı Erel	3–6, 6–1, 3–6
Win	3–1	Jan 2023	M15 Doha, Qatar	World Tennis Tour	Hard	(Australia) Bernard Tomic	6–4, 7–6^{(7–5)}

=== Doubles 8 (1–7) ===
Legend (doubles) ATP Challenger Tour (0–0) ITF World Tennis Tour (1–6)	Titles by surface Hard (0–6) Clay (1–1) Grass (0–0) Carpet (0–0)

Result	W–L	Date	Tournament	Tier	Surface	Partner	Opponents	Score
Loss	0–1	Aug 2019	M15 Helsinki, Finland	World Tennis Tour	Clay	(Estonia) Vladimir Ivanov	(Poland) Daniel Kossek (Poland) Maciej Smoła	4–6, 2–6
Loss	0–2	Oct 2020	M15 Monastir, Tunisia	World Tennis Tour	Hard	(Switzerland) Mirko Martinez	(Tunisia) Aziz Dougaz (Tunisia) Skander Mansouri	3–6, 5–7
Loss	0–3	Nov 2020	M15 Monastir, Tunisia	World Tennis Tour	Hard	(Estonia) Kenneth Raisma	(Tunisia) Anis Ghorbel (Tunisia) Aziz Ouakaa	w/o
Loss	0–4	Feb 2021	M25 Vale do Lobo, Portugal	World Tennis Tour	Hard	(Russia) Alen Avidzba	(France) Dan Added (Germany) Fabian Fallert	2–6, 7–6^{(7–4)}, [2–10]
Win	1–4	Sep 2022	M15 Haren, Netherlands	World Tennis Tour	Clay	(United Kingdom) Giles Hussey	(Germany) Edison Ambarzumjan (Germany) Aaron James Williams	6–3, 6–1
Loss	1–5	Oct 2022	M15 Heraklion, Greece	World Tennis Tour	Hard	(Czech Republic) Dominik Palan	(Switzerland) Dylan Dietrich (Spain) David Pérez Sanz	6–7^{(5–7)}, 7–6^{(7–4)}, [8–10]
Loss	1–6	Jan 2023	M15 Doha, Qatar	World Tennis Tour	Hard	(Italy) Jacopo Berrettini	(India) Parikshit Somani (Uzbekistan) Khumoyun Sultanov	6–7^{(3–7)}, 2–6
Loss	1–7	May 2025	M15 Heraklion, Greece	WTT	Hard	(Greece) Petros Tsitsipas	(Portugal) Diogo Marques (Australia) Ethan Cook	6–4, 4–6, [6–10]

== Davis Cup ==
=== Participations: (2–3) ===
Group membership World Group (0–0) WG Play-off (0–0) Group I (0–0) Group II (2–1) Group III (0–1) Group IV (0–0)	Matches by surface Hard (2–1) Clay (0–1) Grass (0–0) Carpet (0–0)	Matches by type Singles (2–2) Doubles (0–0)

- ▲ ▼ indicates the outcome of the Davis Cup match followed by the score, date, place of event, the zonal classification and its phase, and the court surface.

Rubber outcome	No.	Rubber	Match type (partner if any)	Opponent nation	Opponent player(s)	Score
▲3–2; 7-8 April 2018; Tere Tennis Center, Tallinn, Estonia; Europe/Africa Zone Group II Relegational play off; Hard (indoor) surface
Defeat	1	V	Singles (dead rubber)	Tunisia	Aziz Ouakaa	4–6, 7–5, [7–10]
▼0–2; 14 September 2019; Tatoi Club, Athens, Greece; Europe Zone Group III Promotional playoff; Clay surface
Defeat	2	II	Singles	Poland	Hubert Hurkacz	1–6, 5–7
▲2–1; 6-7 March 2020; Alex Metreveli Tennis Club, Tbilisi, Georgia; World Group II playoff First round; Hard surface
Victory	3	II	Singles	(Georgia (country)) Georgia	Aleksandre Metreveli	6–4, 4–6, 6–3
Victory	4	IV	Singles	(Georgia (country)) Georgia	Zura Tkemaladze	6–3, 2–6, 7–5
