= 2019 Davis Cup Africa Zone Group III =

International tennis competition

The Africa Zone was the unique zone within Group 3 of the regional Davis Cup competition in 2019. The zone's competition was held in round robin format in Nairobi, Kenya, from 11 to 14 September 2019.

== Participating nations ==
- Algeria
- Benin
- Kenya
- Madagascar
- Mozambique
- Namibia
- Nigeria
- Tunisia

== Draw ==
Date: 11–14 September

Location: Nairobi Club Ground, Nairobi, Kenya (clay)

Format: Round-robin basis.

=== Seeding ===
Pot	Nation	Rank^{1}	Seed
1	Tunisia	70	1
1	Kenya	76	2
2	Benin	80	3
2	Namibia	81	4
3	Nigeria	88	5
3	Algeria	90	6
4	Mozambique	105	7
4	Madagascar	111	8

- ^{1}Davis Cup Rankings as of 4 February 2019

=== Round Robin ===
==== Pool A ====
		TUN	MOZ	NAM	NGR	RR; W–L	Set; W–L	Game; W–L	Standings
1	Tunisia		3–0	3–0	3–0	3–0	18–1 (95%)	114–55 (67%)	1
7	Mozambique	0–3		2–1	2–1	2–1	9–10 (47%)	77–89 (46%)	2
4	Namibia	0–3	1–2		2–1	1–2	6–12 (33%)	76–97 (44%)	3
5	Nigeria	0–3	1–2	1–2		0–3	4–14 (22%)	71–97 (42%)	4

==== Pool B ====
		KEN	MAD	ALG	BEN	RR; W–L	Set; W–L	Game; W–L	Standings
2	Kenya		2–1	2–1	2–1	3–0	14–8 (64%)	118–111 (52%)	1
8	Madagascar	1–2		3–0	2–1	2–1	13–8 (62%)	106–93 (53%)	2
6	Algeria	1–2	0–3		2–1	1–2	6–15 (29%)	96–118 (45%)	3
3	Benin	1–2	1–2	1–2		0–3	9–11 (45%)	103–101 (50%)	4

Standings are determined by: 1. number of wins; 2. number of matches; 3. in two-team ties, head-to-head records; 4. in three-team ties, (a) percentage of sets won (head-to-head records if two teams remain tied), then (b) percentage of games won (head-to-head records if two teams remain tied), then (c) Davis Cup rankings.

=== Playoffs ===
The winners of the 1st vs 2nd playoffs are promoted to Group II, the losers of the 3rd vs 4th playoff are relegated in group IV

	A Team	Score	B Team
1A vs 2B	Tunisia	2–0	Madagascar
2A vs 1B	Mozambique	0–2	Kenya
3A vs 4B	Nigeria	0–2	Algeria
4A vs 3B	Namibia	0–3	Benin

== Round Robin ==
=== Pool A ===
==== Tunisia vs. Mozambique ====
Tunisia
3
Nairobi Club Ground, Nairobi, Kenya
11 September
Clay

Mozambique
0

			1	2	3
1	(Tunisia) (Mozambique)	Aziz Ouakaa; Bruno Nhavene	6; 1	3; 6	6; 2
2	(Tunisia) (Mozambique)	Skander Mansouri; Franco Mata	6; 1	6; 2
3	(Tunisia) (Mozambique)	Aziz Dougaz / Malek Jaziri; Jaime Sigauque / Ataide Mussagy Suca	6; 1	6; 1

==== Namibia vs. Nigeria ====
Namibia
2
Nairobi Club Ground, Nairobi, Kenya
11 September
Clay

Nigeria
1

			1	2	3
1	(Namibia) (Nigeria)	Codie Schalk van Schalkwyk; Emmanuel Idoko	4; 6	2; 6
2	(Namibia) (Nigeria)	Jean Erasmus; Emmanuel Audu	6; 2	6; 4
3	(Namibia) (Nigeria)	Jean Erasmus / Codie Schalk van Schalkwyk; Paul Etim / Emmanuel Idoko	6; 4	6; 4

==== Tunisia vs. Nigeria ====
Tunisia
3
Nairobi Club Ground, Nairobi, Kenya
12 September
Clay

Nigeria
0

			1	2	3
1	(Tunisia) (Nigeria)	Aziz Ouakaa; Emmanuel Idoko	6; 4	6; 4
2	(Tunisia) (Nigeria)	Skander Mansouri; Emmanuel Audu	6; 3	6; 2
3	(Tunisia) (Nigeria)	Aziz Dougaz / Malek Jaziri; Emmanuel Audu / Emmanuel Idoko	6; 2	7^{7} 6^{2}

==== Namibia vs. Mozambique ====
Namibia
1
Nairobi Club Ground, Nairobi, Kenya
12 September
Clay

Mozambique
2

			1	2	3
1	(Namibia) (Mozambique)	Codie Schalk van Schalkwyk; Bruno Nhavene	4; 6	2; 6
2	(Namibia) (Mozambique)	Jean Erasmus; Franco Mata	7^{8} 6^{6}	6; 3
3	(Namibia) (Mozambique)	Jean Erasmus / Codie Schalk van Schalkwyk; Franco Mata / Bruno Nhavene	4; 6	3; 6

==== Tunisia vs. Namibia ====
Tunisia
3
Nairobi Club Ground, Nairobi, Kenya
13 September
Clay

Namibia
0

			1	2	3
1	(Tunisia) (Namibia)	Aziz Ouakaa; Codie Schalk van Schalkwyk	6; 2	7^{7} 6^{1}
2	(Tunisia) (Namibia)	Aziz Dougaz; Jean Erasmus	6; 3	7^{7} 6^{5}
3	(Tunisia) (Namibia)	Skander Mansouri / Aziz Ouakaa; Codie Schalk van Schalkwyk / Connor Henry van Schalkwyk	6; 2	6; 1

==== Nigeria vs. Mozambique ====
Nigeria
1
Nairobi Club Ground, Nairobi, Kenya
13 September
Clay

Mozambique
2

			1	2	3
1	(Nigeria) (Mozambique)	Emmanuel Idoko; Bruno Nhavene	1; 6	4; 6
2	(Nigeria) (Mozambique)	Emmanuel Audu; Franco Mata	5; 7	2; 6
3	(Nigeria) (Mozambique)	Paul Etim / Emmanuel Idoko; Jaime Sigauque / Ataide Mussagy Suca	6; 2	6; 3

=== Pool B ===
==== Kenya vs. Madagascar ====
Kenya
2
Nairobi Club Ground, Nairobi, Kenya
11 September
Clay

Madagascar
1

			1	2	3
1	(Kenya) (Madagascar)	Kevin Cheruiyot; Lucas Andriamasilalao	6; 4	6; 3
2	(Kenya) (Madagascar)	Ismael Changawa Ruwa Mzai; Jean-Jacques Rakotohasy	6; 1	2; 6	7^{7} 6^{1}
3	(Kenya) (Madagascar)	Albert Njogu / Ibrahim Kibet Yego; Antso Rakotondramanga / Toky Ranaivo	6; 4	3; 6	6^{6} 7^{8}

==== Benin vs. Algeria ====
Benin
1
Nairobi Club Ground, Nairobi, Kenya
11 September
Clay

Algeria
2

			1	2	3
1	(Benin) (Algeria)	Delmas N'tcha; Youcef Rihane	4; 6	5; 7
2	(Benin) (Algeria)	Alexis Klégou; Nazim Makhlouf	6; 1	6; 4
3	(Benin) (Algeria)	Alexis Klégou / Delmas N'tcha; Nazim Makhlouf / Youcef Rihane	6^{6} 7^{8}	7; 5	4; 6

==== Kenya vs. Algeria ====
Kenya
2
Nairobi Club Ground, Nairobi, Kenya
12 September
Clay

Algeria
1

			1	2	3
1	(Kenya) (Algeria)	Kevin Cheruiyot; Youcef Rihane	7^{7} 6^{5}	3; 6	3; 6
2	(Kenya) (Algeria)	Ismael Changawa Ruwa Mzai; Nazim Makhlouf	6; 4	7; 5
3	(Kenya) (Algeria)	Ismael Changawa Ruwa Mzai / Ibrahim Kibet Yego; Nazim Makhlouf / Youcef Rihane	6; 4	6^{4} 7^{7}	6; 4

==== Benin vs. Madagascar ====
Benin
1
Nairobi Club Ground, Nairobi, Kenya
12 September
Clay

Madagascar
2

			1	2	3
1	(Benin) (Madagascar)	Sylvestre Monnou; Lucas Andriamasilalao	3; 6	3; 6
2	(Benin) (Madagascar)	Alexis Klégou; Jean-Jacques Rakotohasy	6; 1	6; 4
3	(Benin) (Madagascar)	Alexis Klégou / Arnaud Sewanou; Antso Rakotondramanga / Toky Ranaivo	3; 6	6; 3	6^{4} 7^{7}

==== Kenya vs. Benin ====
Kenya
2
Nairobi Club Ground, Nairobi, Kenya
13 September
Clay

Benin
1

			1	2	3
1	(Kenya) (Benin)	Albert Njogu; Delmas N'tcha	3; 6	2; 6
2	(Kenya) (Benin)	Kevin Cheruiyot; Sylvestre Monnou	6; 3	7^{7} 6^{3}
3	(Kenya) (Benin)	Ismael Changawa Ruwa Mzai / Ibrahim Kibet Yego; Alexis Klégou / Arnaud Sewanou	7; 5	7^{10} 6^{8}

==== Algeria vs. Madagascar ====
Algeria
0
Nairobi Club Ground, Nairobi, Kenya
13 September
Clay

Madagascar
3

			1	2	3
1	(Algeria) (Madagascar)	Mohamed Hassan; Lucas Andriamasilalao	3; 6	4; 6
2	(Algeria) (Madagascar)	Nazim Makhlouf; Jean-Jacques Rakotohasy	4; 6	3; 6
3	(Algeria) (Madagascar)	Samir Hamza Reguig / Mohamed Hassan; Antso Rakotondramanga / Toky Ranaivo	2; 6	2; 6

== Playoffs ==
=== 1st to 2nd playoff ===
==== Madagascar vs. Tunisia ====
Madagascar
0
Nairobi Club Ground, Nairobi, Kenya
14 September
Clay

Tunisia
2

			1	2	3
1	(Madagascar) (Tunisia)	Toky Ranaivo; Aziz Ouakaa	4; 6	5; 7
2	(Madagascar) (Tunisia)	Jean-Jacques Rakotohasy; Skander Mansouri	1; 6	4; 6
3	(Madagascar) (Tunisia)	Antso Rakotondramanga / Toky Ranaivo; Aziz Dougaz / Malek Jaziri				not played

=== 3rd to 4th playoff ===
==== Mozambique vs. Kenya ====
Mozambique
0
Nairobi Club Ground, Nairobi, Kenya
14 September
Clay

Kenya
2

			1	2	3
1	(Mozambique) (Kenya)	Bruno Nhavene; Ibrahim Kibet Yego	6^{6} 7^{8}	4; 6
2	(Mozambique) (Kenya)	Franco Mata; Ismael Changawa Ruwa Mzai	1; 6	1; 6
3	(Mozambique) (Kenya)	Franco Mata / Bruno Nhavene; Ismael Changawa Ruwa Mzai / Ibrahim Kibet Yego				not played

=== 5th to 6th playoff ===
==== Algeria vs. Nigeria ====
Algeria
2
Nairobi Club Ground, Nairobi, Kenya
14 September
Clay

Nigeria
0

			1	2	3
1	(Algeria) (Nigeria)	Samir Hamza Reguig; Paul Etim	6; 4	7; 5
2	(Algeria) (Nigeria)	Youcef Rihane; Emmanuel Idoko	6; 1	6; 4
3	(Algeria) (Nigeria)	Nazim Makhlouf / Youcef Rihane; Emmanuel Audu / Emmanuel Idoko				not played

=== 7th to 8th playoff ===
==== Namibia vs. Benin ====
Namibia
0
Nairobi Club Ground, Nairobi, Kenya
14 September
Clay

Benin
3

			1	2	3
1	(Namibia) (Benin)	Codie Schalk van Schalkwyk; Delmas N'tcha	2; 6	6^{1} 7^{7}
2	(Namibia) (Benin)	Jean Erasmus; Alexis Klégou	1; 6	2; 6
3	(Namibia) (Benin)	Riaan de Wit / Connor Henry van Schalkwyk; Sylvestre Monnou / Arnaud Sewanou	5; 7	6; 4	2; 10
