= 2021 Open d'Orléans – Singles =

Tennis tournament in France

Singles
- 2021 Open d'Orléans

Final
- Champion: (Switzerland) Henri Laaksonen
- Runner-up: (Austria) Dennis Novak
- Score: 6–1, 2–6, 6–2

Events
Singles	Doubles
← 2019 ·	Open d'Orléans	· 2022 →

Mikael Ymer was the defending champion but chose not to defend his title.

Henri Laaksonen won the title after defeating Dennis Novak 6–1, 2–6, 6–2 in the final.

== Seeds ==
1. (France) Ugo Humbert (first round)
2. (France) Benjamin Bonzi (second round)
3. (France) Arthur Rinderknech (second round)
4. (France) Richard Gasquet (quarterfinals)
5. (Czech Republic) Jiří Veselý (semifinals)
6. (France) Corentin Moutet (semifinals)
7. (France) Gilles Simon (first round)
8. (France) Pierre-Hugues Herbert (second round)

== Draw ==
=== Key ===
- Q = Qualifier
- WC = Wild card
- LL = Lucky loser
- Alt = Alternate
- ITF = ITF entry
- PR = Protected ranking
- SR = Special ranking
- SE = Special exempt
- JE = Junior exempt
- JR = Junior Accelerator Programme entrant
- CO = College Accelerator Programme entrant
- NG = Next Gen Accelerator Program entrant
- w/o = Walkover
- r = Retired
- d = Defaulted

=== Finals ===
Semifinals
(Austria) Dennis Novak	6^{2}	7^{8}	6
6/WC	(France) Corentin Moutet	7^{7}	6^{6}	4
5	(Czech Republic) Jiří Veselý	3	3
(Switzerland) Henri Laaksonen	6	6

Final
(Austria) Dennis Novak	1	6	2
(Switzerland) Henri Laaksonen	6	2	6

=== Top half ===
First round
1/WC	(France) U Humbert	6^{12}	4
(France) Q Halys	7^{14}	6
(France) G Barrère	5	5
(Austria) D Novak	7	7
(Portugal) J Sousa	4	6	4
Alt	(Belgium) R Bemelmans	6	4	6
(Germany) D Masur	7^{7}	3	2
8	(France) P-H Herbert	6^{5}	6	6
3	(France) A Rinderknech	3	6	6
(France) A Hoang	6	4	3
(Spain) F Verdasco	4	2
LL	(France) H Grenier	6	6
(Latvia) E Gulbis	3	2
(Russia) R Safiullin	6	6
Q	(France) K Jacquet	6^{1}	1
6/WC	(France) C Moutet	7^{7}	6

Second round
(France) Q Halys	4	4
(Austria) D Novak	6	6
Alt	(Belgium) R Bemelmans	3	7	6
8	(France) P-H Herbert	6	5	4
3	(France) A Rinderknech	4	2
LL	(France) H Grenier	6	6
(Russia) R Safiullin	4	6	6^{7}
6/WC	(France) C Moutet	6	2	7^{9}

Quarterfinals
(Austria) D Novak	7^{8}	7^{8}
Alt	(Belgium) R Bemelmans	6^{6}	6^{6}
LL	(France) H Grenier	4	6^{5}
6/WC	(France) C Moutet	6	7^{7}

Semifinals
(Austria) D Novak	6^{2}	7^{8}	6
6/WC	(France) C Moutet	7^{7}	6^{6}	4

=== Bottom half ===
First round
5	(Czech Republic) J Veselý	6^{5}	7^{7}	7^{7}
Q	(Russia) E Karlovskiy	7^{7}	6^{0}	6^{3}
(Italy) R Marcora	1	3
(Chile) A Tabilo	6	6
(Sweden) E Ymer	3	6	1
(France) L Pouille	6	3	6
Q	(Italy) M Viola	7^{7}	1	0
4	(France) R Gasquet	6^{4}	6	6
7	(France) G Simon	4	0
(Denmark) H Rune	6	6
(Lithuania) R Berankis	6^{0}	6	6
Q	(Canada) B Schnur	7^{7}	4	2
(Belgium) Z Bergs	3	1
(Switzerland) H Laaksonen	6	6
WC	(France) H Mayot	1	3
2	(France) B Bonzi	6	6

Second round
5	(Czech Republic) J Veselý	6	6
(Chile) A Tabilo	3	1
(France) L Pouille	6	6^{5}	3
4	(France) R Gasquet	3	7^{7}	6
(Denmark) H Rune	6	6
(Lithuania) R Berankis	2	4
(Switzerland) H Laaksonen	7^{8}	6
2	(France) B Bonzi	6^{6}	4

Quarterfinals
5	(Czech Republic) J Veselý	6^{6}	6	6
4	(France) R Gasquet	7^{8}	4	2
(Denmark) H Rune	3	4
(Switzerland) H Laaksonen	6	6

Semifinals
5	(Czech Republic) J Veselý	3	3
(Switzerland) H Laaksonen	6	6
