= 2021 Open d'Orléans – Doubles =

Tennis tournament in France

Doubles
- 2021 Open d'Orléans

Final
- Champions: (France) Pierre-Hugues Herbert (France) Albano Olivetti
- Runners-up: (France) Antoine Hoang (France) Kyrian Jacquet
- Score: 6–2, 2–6, [11–9]

Events
Singles	Doubles
← 2019 ·	Open d'Orléans	· 2022 →

Romain Arneodo and Hugo Nys were the defending champions but only Arneodo chose to defend his title, partnering Quentin Halys. Arneodo lost in the quarterfinals to Antoine Hoang and Kyrian Jacquet.

Pierre-Hugues Herbert and Albano Olivetti won the title after defeating Hoang and Jacquet 6–2, 2–6, [11–9] in the final.

== Seeds ==
1. (France) Pierre-Hugues Herbert / (France) Albano Olivetti (champions)
2. (United Kingdom) Lloyd Glasspool / (Finland) Harri Heliövaara (first round)
3. (United States) Nathaniel Lammons / (Netherlands) David Pel (semifinals)
4. (Ukraine) Denys Molchanov / (Australia) Matt Reid (first round)

== Draw ==
=== Key ===
- Q = Qualifier
- WC = Wild card
- LL = Lucky loser
- Alt = Alternate
- ITF = ITF entry
- PR = Protected ranking
- SR = Special ranking
- SE = Special exempt
- JE = Junior exempt
- JR = Junior Accelerator Programme entrant
- CO = College Accelerator Programme entrant
- NG = Next Gen Accelerator Program entrant
- w/o = Walkover
- r = Retired
- d = Defaulted

First round
1	(France) P-H Herbert (France) A Olivetti	6	6
(Croatia) I Sabanov (Croatia) M Sabanov	4	4
WC	(France) G Barrère (France) J Eysseric	3	6^{2}
(Germany) A Begemann (Slovakia) I Zelenay	6	7^{7}
3	(United States) N Lammons (Netherlands) D Pel	6	6
(Chile) A Tabilo (Spain) F Verdasco	4	4
(Poland) S Walków (Poland) J Zieliński	6	6
WC	(France) A Fils (France) G Mpetshi Perricard	3	4
(Poland) K Drzewiecki (Spain) S Martos Gornés	6^{6}	6^{5}
WC	(France) A Hoang (France) K Jacquet	7^{8}	7^{7}
(Monaco) R Arneodo (France) Q Halys	6	3	[10]
4	(Ukraine) D Molchanov (Australia) M Reid	2	6	[4]
(United States) H Reese (Spain) D Vega Hernández	6	3	[8]
(Philippines) T Huey (Denmark) F Nielsen	4	6	[10]
(United States) R Galloway (United States) A Lawson	6	4	[12]
2	(United Kingdom) L Glasspool (Finland) H Heliövaara	3	6	[10]

Quarterfinals
1	(France) P-H Herbert (France) A Olivetti	6	6
(Germany) A Begemann (Slovakia) I Zelenay	3	4
3	(United States) N Lammons (Netherlands) D Pel	7	7^{7}
(Poland) S Walków (Poland) J Zieliński	5	6^{5}
WC	(France) A Hoang (France) K Jacquet	6	6
(Monaco) R Arneodo (France) Q Halys	2	4
(Philippines) T Huey (Denmark) F Nielsen	6	5	[3]
(United States) R Galloway (United States) A Lawson	3	7	[10]

Semifinals
1	(France) P-H Herbert (France) A Olivetti	7^{7}	6^{6}	[10]
3	(United States) N Lammons (Netherlands) D Pel	6^{4}	7^{8}	[4]
WC	(France) A Hoang (France) K Jacquet	6	6^{1}	[10]
(United States) R Galloway (United States) A Lawson	4	7^{7}	[6]

Final
1	(France) P-H Herbert (France) A Olivetti	6	2	[11]
WC	(France) A Hoang (France) K Jacquet	2	6	[9]
