= 2021 Davis Cup Africa Zone Group III =

Davis Cup competition in 2021

The Africa Zone was the unique zone within Group 3 of the regional Davis Cup competition in 2021. The zone's competition was held in round robin format in Cairo, Egypt, from 11 to 14 August 2021.

== Participating nations ==
- Algeria
- Benin
- Egypt
- Ghana
- Kenya
- Mozambique
- Rwanda

=== Withdrawn nations ===
- Madagascar

== Draw ==
Date: 11–18 August 2021

Location: Smash Tennis Academy, Cairo, Egypt (clay)

Format: Round-robin basis. Two pools – one of four teams and one of three teams – and nations will play each team once in their group. Nations finishing in the top two of each group will play-off for promotion, with the winner of Group A facing the runner-up of Group B, and the winner of Group B facing the runner-up of Group A.

The two teams finishing third in their groups will enter a relegation play-off, with the beaten team joining the team finishing fourth in contesting Africa Group IV in 2022.

=== Seeding ===
Pot	Nation	Rank^{1}	Seed
1	Egypt	67	1
1	Kenya	70	2
2	Mozambique	83	3
2	Algeria	85	4
3	Benin	94	5
3	Ghana	96	6
3	Rwanda	99	7

- ^{1}Davis Cup Rankings as of 8 March 2021

=== Round Robin ===
==== Pool A ====
		EGY	BEN	ALG	RR; W–L	Set; W–L	Game; W–L	Standings
1	Egypt		2–1	3–0	5–1	11–2 (85%)	76–47 (62%)	1
5	Benin	1–2		2–1	3–3	7–8 (47%)	62–73 (46%)	2
4	Algeria	0–3	1–2		1–5	3–11 (21%)	54–72 (43%)	3

==== Pool B ====
		KEN	MOZ	RWA	GHA	RR; W–L	Set; W–L	Game; W–L	Standings
2	Kenya		3–0	3–0	3–0	8–1	16–3 (84%)	111–45 (71%)	1
3	Mozambique	0–3		2–1	3–0	6–3	13–7 (65%)	90–64 (58%)	2
7	Rwanda	0–3	1–2		3–0	4–5	9–12 (43%)	86–98 (47%)	3
6	Ghana	0–3	0–3	0–3		0–9	2–17 (11%)	36–113 (24%)	4

Standings are determined by: 1. number of wins; 2. number of matches; 3. in two-team ties, head-to-head records; 4. in three-team ties, (a) percentage of sets won (head-to-head records if two teams remain tied), then (b) percentage of games won (head-to-head records if two teams remain tied), then (c) Davis Cup rankings.

=== Playoffs ===
Placing	A Team	Score	B Team
Promotional	Egypt	3–0	Mozambique
Promotional	Benin	2–1	Kenya
Relegation	Algeria	3–0	Rwanda
Relegation	—		Ghana

== Round Robin ==
=== Pool A ===
==== Egypt vs. Benin ====
Egypt
2
Smash Tennis Academy, Cairo, Egypt
11 August 2021
Clay

Benin
1

			1	2	3
1	(Egypt) (Benin)	Amr Asrawy; Delmas N'Tcha	6; 2	6; 0
2	(Egypt) (Benin)	Mohamed Safwat; Alexis Klégou	7^{7} 6^{2}	6; 2
3	(Egypt) (Benin)	Adham Gaber / Sherif Makhlouf; Alexis Klégou / Delmas N'Tcha	6; 4	2; 6	6^{5} 7^{7}

==== Algeria vs. Benin ====
Algeria
1
Smash Tennis Academy, Cairo, Egypt
12 August 2021
Clay

Benin
2

			1	2	3
1	(Algeria) (Benin)	Youcef Rihane; Delmas N'Tcha	6; 0	3; 6	6; 1
2	(Algeria) (Benin)	Nazim Makhlouf; Alexis Klégou	2; 6	4; 6
3	(Algeria) (Benin)	Nazim Makhlouf / Youcef Rihane; Alexis Klégou / Delmas N'Tcha	6; 4	4; 6	3; 6

==== Egypt vs. Algeria ====
Egypt
3
Smash Tennis Academy, Cairo, Egypt
13 August 2021
Clay

Algeria
0

			1	2	3
1	(Egypt) (Algeria)	Amr Asrawy; Youcef Rihane	6; 4	7^{7} 6^{3}
2	(Egypt) (Algeria)	Mohamed Safwat; Nazim Makhlouf	6; 3	6; 3
3	(Egypt) (Algeria)	Adham Gaber / Sherif Makhlouf; Mohamed Amine Aïssa Khelifa / Aymen Abderrahmene Ali Moussa	6; 0	6; 4

=== Pool B ===
==== Kenya vs. Rwanda ====
Kenya
3
Smash Tennis Academy, Cairo, Egypt
11 August 2021
Clay

Rwanda
0

			1	2	3
1	(Kenya) (Rwanda)	Albert Njogu; Etienne Niyigena	6; 1	6; 1
2	(Kenya) (Rwanda)	Ismael Changawa Ruwa Mzai; Bertin Karenzi	7^{7} 6^{4}	6; 2
3	(Kenya) (Rwanda)	Kevin Cheruiyot / Ibrahim Kibet Yego; Junior Joseph Mfashingabo / Joshua Muhire	6; 4	6; 2

==== Mozambique vs. Ghana ====
Mozambique
3
Smash Tennis Academy, Cairo, Egypt
11 August 2021
Clay

Ghana
0

			1	2	3
1	(Mozambique) (Ghana)	N/A; N/A				w/o
2	(Mozambique) (Ghana)	N/A; N/A				w/o
3	(Mozambique) (Ghana)	N/A / N/A; N/A / N/A				w/o

==== Kenya vs. Mozambique ====
Kenya
2
Smash Tennis Academy, Cairo, Egypt
12 August 2021
Clay

Mozambique
1

			1	2	3
1	(Kenya) (Mozambique)	Albert Njogu; Bruno Nhavene	6^{5} 7^{7}	4; 6
2	(Kenya) (Mozambique)	Ismael Changawa Ruwa Mzai; Franco Mata	6; 1	1; 0		retired
3	(Kenya) (Mozambique)	Ismael Changawa Ruwa Mzai / Ibrahim Kibet Yego; Bruno Nhavene / Jaime Sigauque	6; 2	4; 6	6; 2

==== Ghana vs. Rwanda ====
Ghana
0
Smash Tennis Academy, Cairo, Egypt
12 August 2021
Clay

Rwanda
3

			1	2	3
1	(Ghana) (Rwanda)	Benjamin Palm; Etienne Niyigena	4; 6	2; 6
2	(Ghana) (Rwanda)	Japheth Anwasiba Bagerbaseh; Bertin Karenzi	6; 3	5; 7	1; 3	retired
3	(Ghana) (Rwanda)	Samuel Agbesi Osei Antwi / Benjamin Palm; Bertin Karenzi / Etienne Niyigena	1; 6	6; 3	6^{4} 7^{7}

==== Kenya vs. Ghana ====
Kenya
3
Smash Tennis Academy, Cairo, Egypt
13 August 2021
Clay

Ghana
0

			1	2	3
1	(Kenya) (Ghana)	Ismael Changawa Ruwa Mzai; Samuel Agbesi Osei Antwi	6; 2	6; 0
2	(Kenya) (Ghana)	Ibrahim Kibet Yego; Benjamin Palm	6; 3	0; 0		retired
3	(Kenya) (Ghana)	Albert Njogu / Ibrahim Kibet Yego; Samuel Agbesi Osei Antwi / Benjamin Palm				w/o

==== Mozambique vs. Rwanda ====
Mozambique
2
Smash Tennis Academy, Cairo, Egypt
13 August 2021
Clay

Rwanda
1

			1	2	3
1	(Mozambique) (Rwanda)	Bruno Nhavene; Etienne Niyigena	4; 6	6; 3	6; 3
2	(Mozambique) (Rwanda)	Franco Mata; Bertin Karenzi	1; 6	1; 6
3	(Mozambique) (Rwanda)	Franco Mata / Bruno Nhavene; Bertin Karenzi / Etienne Niyigena	6; 0	6; 2

== Play-offs ==
=== Promotional play-offs ===
==== Egypt vs. Mozambique ====
Egypt
3
Smash Tennis Academy, Cairo, Egypt
14 August 2021
Clay

Mozambique
0

			1	2	3
1	(Egypt) (Mozambique)	Amr Asrawy; Bruno Nhavene	6; 4	6; 4
2	(Egypt) (Mozambique)	Mohamed Safwat; Jaime Sigauque	6; 1	6; 0
3	(Egypt) (Mozambique)	Adham Gaber / Sherif Makhlouf; Armando Sigauque / Jaime Sigauque	6; 0	6; 1

==== Kenya vs. Benin ====
Kenya
1
Smash Tennis Academy, Cairo, Egypt
14 August 2021
Clay

Benin
2

			1	2	3
1	(Kenya) (Benin)	Ismael Changawa Ruwa Mzai; Delmas N'Tcha	6; 4	7^{7} 6^{3}
2	(Kenya) (Benin)	Ibrahim Kibet Yego; Alexis Klégou	5; 7	4; 6
3	(Kenya) (Benin)	Ismael Changawa Ruwa Mzai / Ibrahim Kibet Yego; Alexis Klégou / Delmas N'Tcha	3; 6	3; 6

=== Relegation play-off ===
==== Algeria vs. Rwanda ====
Algeria
3
Smash Tennis Academy, Cairo, Egypt
14 August 2021
Clay

Rwanda
0

			1	2	3
1	(Algeria) (Rwanda)	Mohamed Amine Aïssa Khelifa; Joshua Muhire	6; 4	6; 0
2	(Algeria) (Rwanda)	Youcef Rihane; Bertin Karenzi	6; 2	6; 2
3	(Algeria) (Rwanda)	Mohamed Amine Aïssa Khelifa / Aymen Abderrahmene Ali Moussa; Junior Joseph Mfashingabo / Joshua Muhire	6; 1	6; 0

== Final placements ==
Placing	Teams	
Promoted/First	Egypt	Benin
Third	Mozambique	Kenya
Fifth	Algeria	
Relegated/Sixth	Rwanda	
Relegated/Seventh	Ghana	

- Egypt and Benin were promoted to 2022 Davis Cup World Group II Play-offs.
- Rwanda and Ghana were relegated to 2022 Davis Cup Africa Zone Group IV.
