= Bruno Nhavene =

Mozambican tennis player

- Country (sports): Mozambique
- Born: February 21, 2002 (age 24)
- Prize money: $2,345

Singles
- Career record: 0–0
- Career titles: 0; 0 Challenger, 0 Futures
- Highest ranking: No. 1,764 (19 May 2025)
- Current ranking: No. 1,788 (4 August 2025)

Doubles
- Career record: 0–0
- Career titles: 0; 0 Challenger, 0 Futures
- Highest ranking: No. 1,121 (11 November 2024)
- Current ranking: No. 1,160 (4 August 2025)

Team competitions
- Davis Cup: 10–8
- Last updated on: 18 November 2024.

Bruno Nhavene (born February 21, 2002) is a Mozambican tennis player.

Nhavene has a career high ATP doubles ranking of 1121 achieved on 11 November 2024 and a singles best ranking of 1764 achieved on 19 May 2025. Nhavene has a career high ITF juniors ranking of 168 achieved on 9 March 2020. Nhavene has won one ITF doubles titles in Norman, Oklahoma, in 2024.

Nhavene has represented Mozambique at Davis Cup, where he has a win-loss record of 10–8 (6–6 in singles, 4–2 in doubles). Nhavene made his Davis Cup debut for Mozambique in 2018, while the team was competing in the Africa Zone Group III, when he was 16 years and 118 days old.

== Future and Challenger finals ==
=== Doubles: 1 (0–1) ===
Legend (singles) ATP Challenger Tour (0–0) ITF World Tennis Tour (0–1)	Titles by surface Hard (0–1) Clay (0–0) Grass (0–0) Carpet (0–0)

Result	W–L	Date	Tournament	Tier	Surface	Partner	Opponents	Score
Loss	0–1	Nov 2019	M15 Maputo, Mozambique	World Tennis Tour	Hard	(Australia) Jake Delaney	(Zimbabwe) Benjamin Lock (Zimbabwe) Courtney John Lock	4–6, 3–6

== Davis Cup ==
=== Participations: (10–8) ===
Group membership World Group (0–0) WG Play-off (0–0) Group I (0–0) Group II (0–0) Group III (10–8) Group IV (0–0)	Matches by surface Hard (0–0) Clay (10–8) Grass (0–0) Carpet (0–0)	Matches by type Singles (6–6) Doubles (4–2)

- ▲ ▼ indicates the outcome of the Davis Cup match followed by the score, date, place of event, the zonal classification and its phase, and the court surface.

Rubber outcome	No.	Rubber	Match type (partner if any)	Opponent nation	Opponent player(s)	Score
▼0–3; 19 June 2018; Nairobi Club, Nairobi, Kenya; Africa Zone Group III Round Robin; Clay surface
Defeat	1	I	Singles	Kenya	Ibrahim Yego	2–6, 2–6
▼0–3; 20 June 2018; Nairobi Club, Nairobi, Kenya; Africa Zone Group III Round Robin; Clay surface
Defeat	2	I	Singles	Namibia	Jean Erasmus	4–6, 3–6
Defeat	3	III	Doubles (with Franco Mata) (dead rubber)	Namibia	Jean Erasmus / Tukhula Jacobs	6–7^{(6–8)}, 4–6
▲2–1; 21 June 2018; Nairobi Club, Nairobi, Kenya; Africa Zone Group III Round Robin; Clay surface
Defeat	4	I	Singles	Algeria	Nazim Makhlouf	0–6, 6–7^{(4–7)}
Victory	5	III	Doubles (with Franco Mata)	Algeria	Youcef Ghezal / Nazim Makhlouf	6–4, 6–2
▲2–1; 22 June 2018; Nairobi Club, Nairobi, Kenya; Africa Zone Group III Round Robin; Clay surface
Victory	6	I	Singles	Uganda	David Oringa	1–6, 6–3, 7–6^{(7–3)}
▲2–1; 23 June 2018; Nairobi Club, Nairobi, Kenya; Africa Zone Group III 5th place Playoff; Clay surface
Victory	7	I	Singles	Cameroon	Dieu Ne Dort Midzie	0–6, 6–4, 6–2
Victory	8	III	Doubles (with Franco Mata)	Cameroon	Nkwenti Ngwohoh / Cédric Ngoumtsa	6–4, 7–6^{(7–4)}
▼0–3; 11 September 2019; Nairobi Club, Nairobi, Kenya; Africa Zone Group III Round Robin; Clay surface
Defeat	9	I	Singles	Tunisia	Aziz Ouakaa	1–6, 6–3, 2–6
▲2–1; 12 September 2019; Nairobi Club, Nairobi, Kenya; Africa Zone Group III Round Robin; Clay surface
Victory	10	I	Singles	Namibia	Codie van Schalkwyk	6–4, 6–2
Victory	11	III	Doubles (with Franco Mata)	Namibia	Jean Erasmus / Codie van Schalkwyk	6–4, 6–3
▲2–1; 13 September 2019; Nairobi Club, Nairobi, Kenya; Africa Zone Group III Round Robin; Clay surface
Victory	12	I	Singles	Nigeria	Emmanuel Idoko	6–1, 6–4
▼0–2; 14 September 2019; Nairobi Club, Nairobi, Kenya; Africa Zone Group III 3rd place Playoff; Clay surface
Defeat	13	I	Singles	Kenya	Ibrahim Yego	7–6^{(8–6)}, 6–4
▼1–2; 12 August 2021; Smash Tennis Academy, Cairo, Egypt; Africa Zone Group III Round Robin; Clay surface
Victory	14	I	Singles	Kenya	Albert Njogu	7–6^{(7–5)}, 6–4
Defeat	15	III	Doubles (with Jaime Sigauque)	Kenya	Ismael Mzai / Ibrahim Yego	2–6, 6–4, 2–6
▲2–1; 13 August 2021; Smash Tennis Academy, Cairo, Egypt; Africa Zone Group III Round Robin; Clay surface
Victory	16	I	Singles	Rwanda	Étienne Niyigena	4–6, 6–3, 6–3
Victory	17	III	Doubles (with Franco Mata)	Rwanda	Bertin Karenzi / Étienne Niyigena	6–0, 6–2
▼0–3; 14 August 2021; Smash Tennis Academy, Cairo, Egypt; Africa Zone Group III Promotional Playoff; Clay surface
Defeat	18	I	Singles	Egypt	Amr Asrawy	4–6, 4–6
