= Aziz Ouakaa =

Tunisian tennis player

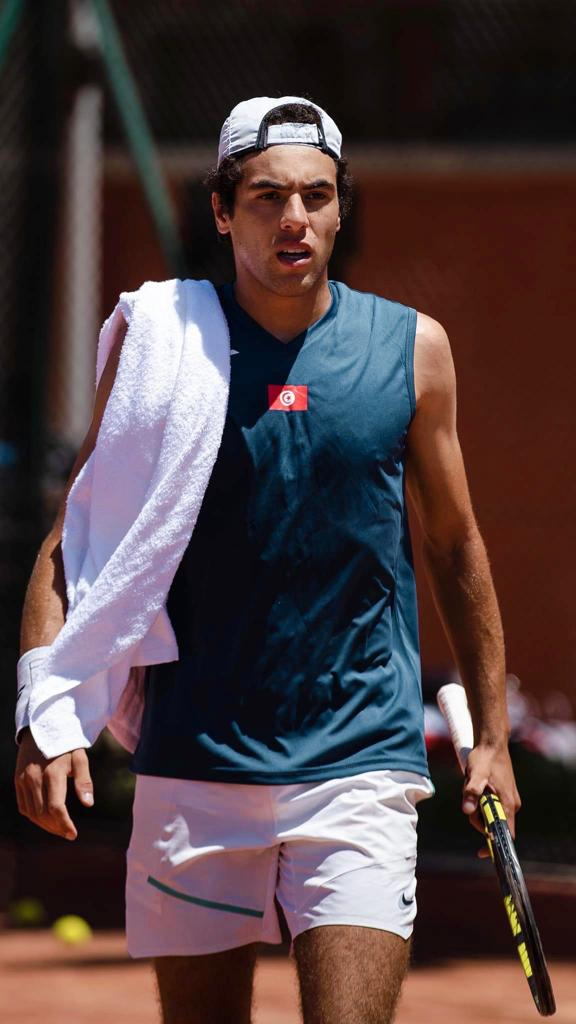
- Country (sports): Tunisia
- Born: 7 August 1999 (age 27) Tunis, Tunisia
- Height: 1.85 m (6 ft 1 in)
- Plays: Right-handed (two-handed backhand)
- Prize money: US $149,521

Singles
- Career record: 2–4 (at ATP Tour level, Grand Slam level, and in Davis Cup)
- Career titles: 15 ITF
- Highest ranking: No. 478 (16 November 2026)
- Current ranking: No. 478 (16 November 2026)

Doubles
- Career record: 4–1
- Career titles: 20 ITF
- Highest ranking: No. 227 (6 May 2024)
- Current ranking: No. 351 (16 November 2026)

Team competitions
- Davis Cup: 8–1
- Last updated on: 16 November 2026.

Aziz Ouakaa (born 7 August 1999) is a Tunisian tennis player. He has a career-high singles ranking by the ATP of world No. 478 achieved on 16 November 2026 and a doubles ranking of No. 227 achieved on 6 May 2024. Ouakaa has won 15 ITF Futures singles and 20 doubles titles. He is currently the No. 3 Tunisian player.

Ouakaa has represented Tunisia at the Davis Cup with a win–loss record of 8–1.

== ATP Challenger and ITF Tour finals ==
=== Doubles: 23 (15–8) ===
Legend ATP Challenger Tour (0–1) ITF Futures Tour (15–7)	Finals by surface Hard (12–4) Clay (3–4)

Result	W–L	Date	Tournament	Tier	Surface	Partner	Opponents	Score
Win	1–0	Nov 2020	Monastir, Tunisia	15,000	Hard	(Tunisia) Anis Ghorbel	(Estonia) Kenneth Raisma (Estonia) Kristjan Tamm	w/o
Loss	1–1	Jun 2021	Skopje, North Macedonia	15,000	Clay	(France) Jean Thirouin	(Netherlands) Gijs Brouwer (Moldova) Alexandr Cozbinov	1–6, 2–6
Win	2–1	Aug 2021	Novi Sad, Serbia	15,000	Clay	(Tunisia) Anis Ghorbel	(United Kingdom) Charles Broom (Croatia) Alen Roglic-Hadzalic	6–4, 7–5
Loss	2–2	Oct 2021	Monastir, Tunisia	15,000	Hard	(Serbia) Viktor Jovic	(Estonia) Daniil Glinka (Estonia) Karl Kiur Saar	4–6, 2–6
Win	3–2	Dec 2021	Monastir, Tunisia	15,000	Hard	(Serbia) Viktor Jovic	(France) Arthur Bouquier (United Kingdom) Stuart Parker	6–4, 3–6, [10–7]
Loss	3–3	Jan 2022	Monastir, Tunisia	25,000	Hard	(Tunisia) Skander Mansouri	(Serbia) Boris Butulija (Czech Republic) Petr Nouza	4–6, 6–3, [7–10]
Loss	3–4	Jun 2022	Monastir, Tunisia	15,000	Hard	(Burundi) Guy Orly Iradukunda	(China) Zheng Baoluo (China) Zhang Ze	3–6, 4–6
Win	4–4	Jun 2022	Monastir, Tunisia	15,000	Hard	(Tunisia) Skander Mansouri	(China) Te Rigele (China) Zhang Ze	7–6^{(7–1)}, 6–2
Win	5–4	Jul 2022	Monastir, Tunisia	15,000	Hard	(Tunisia) Skander Mansouri	(Australia) Ken Cavrak (Australia) Chase Ferguson	7–6^{(7–3)}, 6–3
Win	6–4	Aug 2022	Monastir, Tunisia	15,000	Hard	(Tunisia) Anis Ghorbel	(China) Tang Sheng (China) Zheng Baoluo	6–1, 6–1
Win	7–4	September 2022	Monastir, Tunisia	15,000	Hard	(Tunisia) Anis Ghorbel	(China) Majun Li (China) Tang Sheng	6–4, 4–6, [10–6]
Win	8–4	September 2022	Monastir, Tunisia	15,000	Hard	(Tunisia) Anis Ghorbel	(China) Qian Sun (China) Tang Sheng	6–3, 5–7, [10–8]
Loss	8–5	Apr 2023	Monastir, Tunisia	15,000	Hard	Nikita Ianin	(Switzerland) Yannik Steinegger (Germany) Jakob Schnaitter	(W/O)
Loss	8–6	May 2023	Tunis, Tunisia	Challenger	Clay	(Australia) James McCabe	(France) Theo Arribage (France) Luca Sanchez	6–4, 3–6, [5–10]
Win	9–6	Jul 2023	Monastir, Tunisia	15,000	Hard	(Portugal) Fabio Coelho	(Estonia) Johannes Seeman (Estonia) Siim Troost	3–6, 6–4, [10–4]
Loss	9–7	Jul 2023	Brazzaville, Republic of Congo	25,000	Clay	(Burundi) Guy Orly Iradukunda	(United States) Tauheed Browning (Venezuela) Brandon Perez	5–7, 7–6^{(9–7)}, [6–10]
Win	10–7	Jul 2023	Brazzaville, Republic of Congo	25,000	Clay	(Burundi) Guy Orly Iradukunda	(India) Rishab Agarwal (India) Ishaque Eqbal	7–5, 3–6, [10–8]
Win	11–7	Oct 2023	Monastir, Tunisia	15,000	Hard	(Germany) Kai Wehnelt	(United States) Thomas Brown (Cyprus) Menelaos Efstathiou	6–4, 3–6, [10–5]
Win	12–7	Oct 2023	Monastir, Tunisia	15,000	Hard	(Tunisia) Skander Mansouri	(Spain) Alberto Barroso Campos; Aleksandr Lobanov	7–6 ^{(7–5)}, 6–1
Win	13–7	Nov 2023	Monastir, Tunisia	25,000	Hard	(United Kingdom) Oscar Weightman	(Argentina) Tomás Lipovšek Puches (Italy) Andrea Picchione	7–5, 6–3
Win	14–7	Jan 2024	Monastir, Tunisia	15,000	Hard	(Germany) Christoph Negritu	(Germany) Nicola Kuhn (Spain) David Perez Sanz	6–4, 6–7^{(5–7)}, [10–4]
Loss	14–8	Apr 2024	Hammamet, Tunisia	25,000	Clay	Aleksandr Lobanov	(France) Constantin Bittoun Kouzmine (United Kingdom) Jay Clarke	3–6, 4–6
Win	15–8	Apr 2024	Hammamet, Tunisia	25,000	Clay	Aleksandr Lobanov	(Netherlands) Michiel de Krom (Netherlands) Ryan Nijboer	6–3, 6–4

== Davis Cup ==
=== Participations (6–0) ===
Group membership World Group (0–0) WG Play-off (0–0) Group I (0–0) Group II (1–0) Group III (5–0) Group IV (0–0)	Matches by surface Hard (1–0) Clay (5–0) Grass (0–0) Carpet (0–0)	Matches by type Singles (5–0) Doubles (1–0)

- ▲ ▼ indicates the outcome of the Davis Cup match followed by the score, date, place of event, the zonal classification and its phase, and the court surface.

Rubber outcome	No.	Rubber	Match type (partner if any)	Opponent nation	Opponent player(s)	Score
▲3–2; 7–8 April 2018; Tere Tennis Center, Tallinn, Estonia; Europe/Africa Zone Group II Relegational play off; Hard (indoor) surface
Victory	1	V	Singles (dead rubber)	Estonia	Kristjan Tamm	6–4, 5–7, [10–7]
▲3–0; 11 September 2019; Nairobi Club, Nairobi, Kenya; Africa Zone Group III Pool A Round robin; Clay surface
Victory	2	I	Singles	Mozambique	Bruno Nhavene	6–1, 3–6, 6–2
▲3–0; 12 September 2019; Nairobi Club, Nairobi, Kenya; Africa Zone Group III Pool A Round robin; Clay surface
Victory	3	I	Singles	Nigeria	Emmanuel Idoko	6–4, 6–4
▲3–0; 13 September 2019; Nairobi Club, Nairobi, Kenya; Africa Zone Group III Pool A Round robin; Clay surface
Victory	4	I	Singles	Namibia	Codie van Schalkwyk	6–2, 7–6^{(7–1)}
Victory	5	III	Doubles (with Skander Mansouri) (dead rubber)	Namibia	Codie van Schalkwyk / Connor van Schalkwyk	6–2, 6–1
▲1–0; 14 September 2019; Nairobi Club, Nairobi, Kenya; Africa Zone Group III Pool A Promotional play-off; Clay surface
Victory	6	I	Singles	Madagascar	Toky Ranaivo	6–4, 7–5
