= Skander Mansouri =

Tunisian tennis player (born 1995)

- Country (sports): Tunisia
- Born: 23 July 1995 (age 31) Tunis, Tunisia
- Height: 1.93 m (6 ft 4 in)
- Turned pro: September 2018
- Plays: Right-handed (two-handed backhand)
- Prize money: US $455,327

Singles
- Career record: 1-5 (at ATP Tour level, Grand Slam level, and in Davis Cup)
- Career titles: 0
- Highest ranking: No. 238 (12 December 2022)
- Current ranking: No. 1,307 (16 November 2026)

Doubles
- Career record: 27-29 (at ATP Tour level, Grand Slam level, and in Davis Cup)
- Career titles: 0
- Highest ranking: No. 54 (6 January 2025)
- Current ranking: No. 210 (16 November 2026)

Grand Slam doubles results
- Australian Open: 2R (2025)
- French Open: 2R (2024)
- Wimbledon: 2R (2024)
- US Open: 2R (2024)

Team competitions
- Davis Cup: 10–2
Medal record
Representing Tunisia
Men's Tennis
African Games
Gold medal – first place	2019 Rabat	Doubles
- Last updated on: 16 November 2026.

Skander Mansouri (born 23 July 1995) is a Tunisian professional tennis player. He has a career-high ATP doubles ranking of world No. 54 achieved on 6 January 2025 and a singles ranking of No. 238 achieved on 12 December 2022.

At the 2019 African Games, he won the gold medal at the men's doubles event with countryman Aziz Dougaz.

Mansouri represents Tunisia in the Davis Cup where he has a win/loss record of 10–2.

== Career ==
Mansouri made his ATP Tour main-draw debut at the 2015 Winston-Salem Open, in the doubles draw partnering Christian Seraphim.

He reached the top 100 in the rankings at world No. 99 on 29 January 2024 when he won a Challenger title at the 2024 BW Open with Luke Johnson.

Partnering Nicolás Barrientos, he was runner-up at the 2024 Almaty Open, losing to Rithvik Choudary Bollipalli and Arjun Kadhe in the final.

Playing with Ivan Dodig, Mansouri reached the final at the 2024 Belgrade Open, losing to Jamie Murray and John Peers.

== ATP career finals ==
=== Doubles: 2 (2 runner-ups) ===
Legend Grand Slam (0–0) ATP Masters 1000 (0–0) ATP 500 Series (0–0) ATP 250 Series (0–2)	Finals by surface Hard (0–2) Clay (0–0) Grass (0–0)

Result	W–L	Date	Tournament	Tier	Surface	Partner	Opponents	Score
Loss	0–1	Oct 2024	Almaty Open, Kazakhstan	250 Series	Hard (i)	(Colombia) Nicolás Barrientos	(India) Rithvik Choudary Bollipalli (India) Arjun Kadhe	6–3, 6–7^{(3–7)}, [12–14]
Loss	0–2	Nov 2024	Belgrade Open, Serbia	250 Series	Hard (i)	(Croatia) Ivan Dodig	(United Kingdom) Jamie Murray (Australia) John Peers	6–3, 6–7^{(5–7)}, [9–11]

== Challenger and Futures/World Tennis Tour finals ==
=== Singles: 27 (17-10) ===
Legend ATP Challenger Tour (0–0) ITF Futures/World Tennis Tour (17–10)	Finals by surface Hard (17-10) Clay (0–0)

Result	W–L	Date	Tournament	Tier	Surface	Opponent	Score
Win	1–0	Dec 2018	Cameroon F1, Yaoundé	Futures	Hard	(France) Evan Furness	3–6, 6–3, 6–4
Loss	1–1	Dec 2018	Cameroon F2, Yaoundé	Futures	Hard	(France) Corentin Denolly	6–7^{(3–7)}, 4–6
Loss	1–2	Jan 2019	M15 Monastir, Tunisia	World Tennis Tour	Hard	(Monaco) Lucas Catarina	4–6, 5–7
Win	2–2	Jan 2019	M15 Monastir, Tunisia	World Tennis Tour	Hard	(Italy) Riccardo Balzerani	7–5, 6–3
Win	3–2	Jan 2019	M15 Monastir, Tunisia	World Tennis Tour	Hard	(Brazil) Gilbert Klier Júnior	7–5, 6–1
Loss	3–3	Feb 2019	M15 Monastir, Tunisia	World Tennis Tour	Hard	(France) Corentin Denolly	6–7^{(10–12)}, 6–3, 5–7
Win	4–3	Feb 2019	M15 Monastir, Tunisia	World Tennis Tour	Hard	(Belgium) Christopher Heyman	6–4, 4–1 ret.
Win	5–3	Sep 2019	M25+H Oliveira de Azeméis, Portugal	World Tennis Tour	Hard	(Colombia) Eduardo Struvay	6–2, 6–1
Win	6–3	Dec 2019	M15 Monastir, Tunisia	World Tennis Tour	Hard	(Turkey) Ergi Kırkın	6–2, 6–0
Win	7–3	Nov 2020	M15 Monastir, Tunisia	World Tennis Tour	Hard	(Argentina) Thiago Agustín Tirante	4–6, 6–3, 7–6^{(7–5)}
Win	8–3	Dec 2020	M15 Monastir, Tunisia	World Tennis Tour	Hard	(Japan) Kaichi Uchida	6–4, 7–6^{(7–3)}
Loss	8–4	Jan 2021	M15 Monastir, Tunisia	World Tennis Tour	Hard	(Ukraine) Eric Vanshelboim	6-3, 4-6, 3-6
Win	9-4	Oct 2021	M15 Monastir, Tunisia	World Tennis Tour	Hard	(Australia) Moerani Bouzige	6-2, 6-4
Loss	9-5	Dec 2021	M15 Monastir, Tunisia	World Tennis Tour	Hard	(Japan) Renta Tokuda	7-5, 4-6, 3-6
Win	10-5	Jan 2022	M15 Monastir, Tunisia	World Tennis Tour	Hard	(Japan) Renta Tokuda	6-1, 7-6^{(8-6)}
Win	11-5	Jan 2022	M25 Monastir, Tunisia	World Tennis Tour	Hard	(Italy) Giovanni Oradini	6–4, 6-4
Win	12-5	Mar 2022	M15 Monastir, Tunisia	World Tennis Tour	Hard	(Belgium) Arnaud Bovy	7-5, 4-6, 6-0
Win	13-5	May 2022	M15 Monastir, Tunisia	World Tennis Tour	Hard	(Australia) Li Tu	6-4, 6-2
Loss	13-6	May 2022	M25 Monastir, Tunisia	World Tennis Tour	Hard	(Australia) Li Tu	7-6^{(7-3)}, 4-6, 6-7^{(4-7)}
Loss	13-7	Jun 2022	M15 Monastir, Tunisia	World Tennis Tour	Hard	(Tunisia) Aziz Dougaz	4-6, 4-6
Loss	13-8	Jun 2022	M15 Monastir, Tunisia	World Tennis Tour	Hard	(Tunisia) Aziz Dougaz	6-7^{(5-7)}, 0-6
Loss	13-9	Jun 2022	M15 Monastir, Tunisia	World Tennis Tour	Hard	(Tunisia) Aziz Dougaz	6-7^{(4-7)}, 3-6
Loss	13-10	Jul 2022	M15 Monastir, Tunisia	World Tennis Tour	Hard	(Jordan) Abedallah Shelbayh	6-7^{(3-7)}, 4-6
Win	14-10	Sep 2022	M15 Monastir, Tunisia	World Tennis Tour	Hard	(Ivory Coast) Eliakim Coulibaly	6-3, 6-4
Win	15-10	Nov 2022	M15 Monastir, Tunisia	World Tennis Tour	Hard	(United States) Omni Kumar	6-3, 6-4
Win	16-10	May 2023	M15 Monastir, Tunisia	World Tennis Tour	Hard	(United States) Omni Kumar	6-3, 6-4
Win	17-10	May 2023	M15 Monastir, Tunisia	World Tennis Tour	Hard	(Morocco) Yassine Dlimi	6–4, 6-3

=== Doubles: 61 (46–15) ===
Legend ATP Challenger Tour (12–5) ITF Futures/World Tennis Tour (34–10)	Finals by surface Hard (38–9) Clay (8–5) Grass (0–1)

Result	W–L	Date	Tournament	Tier	Surface	Partner	Opponents	Score
Loss	0–1	Jul 2013	Egypt F16, Sharm El Sheikh	Futures	Clay	(Burundi) Hassan Ndayishimiye	(Bosnia and Herzegovina) Nerman Fatić (Bosnia and Herzegovina) Ismar Gorčić	3–6, 4–6
Win	1–1	Oct 2013	Egypt F28, Sharm El Sheikh	Futures	Clay	(Colombia) Cristian Rodríguez	(Turkey) Tuna Altuna (Russia) Ivan Nedelko	6–3, 6–1
Win	2–1	Dec 2013	Qatar F4, Doha	Futures	Hard	(United Kingdom) Evan Hoyt	(Georgia (country)) Nikoloz Basilashvili (Belarus) Yahor Yatsyk	6–4, 7–6^{(7–2)}
Loss	2–2	Dec 2015	Tunisia F36, El Kantaoui	Futures	Hard	(Tunisia) Moez Echargui	(France) Antoine Hoang (France) Ronan Joncour	6–7^{(6–8)}, 6–7^{(0–7)}
Win	3–2	Jul 2016	Morocco F4, Nador	Futures	Clay	(Tunisia) Aziz Dougaz	(Spain) Alejandro García Sáez (Spain) Daniel Monedero-González	6–3, 6–4
Win	4–2	Jun 2017	Tunisia F22, Hammamet	Futures	Clay	(Tunisia) Aziz Dougaz	(Tunisia) Moez Echargui (Portugal) Gonçalo Oliveira	7–6^{(7–4)}, 6–1
Win	5–2	Jun 2017	Tunisia F24, Hammamet	Futures	Clay	(Tunisia) Aziz Dougaz	(France) Théo Fournerie (France) Louis Tessa	6–2, 6–4
Loss	5–3	Jul 2017	Morocco F1, Tanger	Futures	Clay	(United States) Nick Chappell	(Colombia) Juan Manuel Benítez Chavarriaga (United States) Raleigh Smith	4–6, 6–7^{(3–7)}
Loss	5–4	Aug 2017	Morocco F3, Casablanca	Futures	Clay	(United States) Nick Chappell	(France) Elliot Benchetrit (France) Maxime Hamou	6–7^{(4–7)}, 7–6^{(7–2)}, [5–10]
Win	6–4	Sep 2018	Tunisia F33, Monastir	Futures	Hard	(Belarus) Ivan Liutarevich	(Turkey) Altuğ Çelikbilek (France) Florent Diep	6–3, 6–1
Win	7–4	Oct 2018	Tunisia F36, Monastir	Futures	Hard	(Benin) Alexis Klégou	(Russia) Petr Arkhipov (Russia) Bogdan Bobrov	6–4, 6–0
Win	8–4	Oct 2018	Tunisia F37, Monastir	Futures	Hard	(Benin) Alexis Klégou	(Switzerland) Rémy Bertola (Switzerland) Yannik Steinegger	6–2, 6–1
Win	9–4	Dec 2018	Cameroon F1, Yaoundé	Futures	Hard	(Tunisia) Aziz Dougaz	(France) Sadio Doumbia (Brazil) Diego Matos	6–4, 6–7^{(5–7)}, [10–8]
Win	10–4	Dec 2018	Cameroon F2, Yaoundé	Futures	Hard	(Tunisia) Aziz Dougaz	(France) Sadio Doumbia (Brazil) Diego Matos	6–4, 6–2
Loss	10–5	Jan 2019	M15 Monastir, Tunisia	World Tennis Tour	Hard	(Germany) Christian Seraphim	(Italy) Luca Giacomini (Italy) Adelchi Virgili	7–5, 4–6, [6–10]
Win	11–5	Feb 2019	M15 Monastir, Tunisia	World Tennis Tour	Hard	(United Kingdom) Evan Hoyt	(Ecuador) Diego Hidalgo (Brazil) Gilbert Klier Júnior	7–6^{(7–1)}, 6–4
Win	12–5	Feb 2019	M15 Monastir, Tunisia	World Tennis Tour	Hard	(Ecuador) Diego Hidalgo	(France) Dan Added (France) Yanais Laurent	7–5, 6–0
Win	13–5	Mar 2019	Yokohama, Japan	Challenger	Hard	(Tunisia) Moez Echargui	(Australia) Max Purcell (Australia) Luke Saville	7–6^{(8–6)}, 6–7^{(3–7)}, [10–7]
Win	14–5	Sep 2019	M25 La Marsa, Tunisia	World Tennis Tour	Clay	(Tunisia) Aziz Dougaz	(Tunisia) Moez Echargui (France) Thomas Setodji	6–2, 4–6, [10–8]
Win	15–5	Oct 2019	M25+H Lagos, Nigeria	World Tennis Tour	Hard	(Tunisia) Aziz Dougaz	(Zimbabwe) Benjamin Lock (Zimbabwe) Courtney John Lock	7–6^{(7–4)}, 6–3
Win	16–5	Oct 2019	M25 Monastir, Tunisia	World Tennis Tour	Hard	(Cyprus) Petros Chrysochos	(France) Gabriel Petit (France) Hugo Pontico	7–5, 6–2
Win	17–5	Dec 2019	M15 Monastir, Tunisia	World Tennis Tour	Hard	(France) Florian Lakat	(Russia) Yan Bondarevskiy (Tunisia) Anis Ghorbel	7–6^{(8–6)}, 6–4
Win	18–5	Dec 2019	M15 Monastir, Tunisia	World Tennis Tour	Hard	(France) Geoffrey Blancaneaux	(France) Baptiste Crepatte (France) Gabriel Petit	6–0, 7–6^{(7–1)}
Win	19–5	Oct 2020	M15 Monastir, Tunisia	World Tennis Tour	Hard	(Tunisia) Aziz Dougaz	(Germany) Mats Rosenkranz (Germany) Tom Schönenberg	4–6, 7–6^{(7–1)}, [10–5]
Win	20–5	Oct 2020	M15 Monastir, Tunisia	World Tennis Tour	Hard	(Tunisia) Aziz Dougaz	(Switzerland) Mirko Martinez (Estonia) Kristjan Tamm	6–3, 7–5
Loss	20–6	Dec 2020	M15 Monastir, Tunisia	World Tennis Tour	Hard	(Germany) Mats Rosenkranz	(Austria) Alexander Erler (Austria) David Pichler	2–6, 6–7^{(12–14)}
Loss	20–7	Dec 2020	M15 Monastir, Tunisia	World Tennis Tour	Hard	(France) Dan Added	(Austria) Alexander Erler (Austria) David Pichler	6–7^{(7–9)}, 3–6
Loss	20–8	Jan 2021	M15 Monastir, Tunisia	World Tennis Tour	Hard	(Austria) David Pichler	(France) Tom Jomby (France) Ronan Joncour	7–6^{(8-6)}, 6-7^{(7-9)}, [7-10]
Win	21–8	Feb 2021	M15 Monastir, Tunisia	World Tennis Tour	Hard	(Austria) Alexander Erler	(Japan) Naoki Nakagawa (Japan) Ryota Tanuma	6–0, 7-5
Win	22–8	Feb 2021	M15 Monastir, Tunisia	World Tennis Tour	Hard	(Austria) Alexander Erler	(France) Lilian Marmousez (France) Giovanni Mpetshi Perricard	6–2, 5-7, [11-9]
Loss	22–9	Apr 2021	Salinas, Ecuador	Challenger	Hard	(Ecuador) Diego Hidalgo	(Mexico) Miguel Ángel Reyes-Varela (Brazil) Fernando Romboli	5-7, 6-4, [2-10]
Win	23–9	Oct 2021	M25 Quinta do Lago, Portugal	World Tennis Tour	Hard	(United Kingdom) Evan Hoyt	(Spain) Alberto Barroso Campos (Spain) Roberto Ortega-Olmedo	4–6, 6-3, [10-5]
Loss	23–10	Jan 2022	M15 Monastir, Tunisia	World Tennis Tour	Hard	(Tunisia) Aziz Ouakaa	(Serbia) Boris Butulija (Czech Republic) Petr Nouza	4–6, 6-3, [7-10]
Win	24–10	Jan 2022	M25 Monastir, Tunisia	World Tennis Tour	Hard	(Germany) Marko Topo	(France) Florent Bax (France) Robin Bertrand	6–4, 7-5
Win	25–10	May 2022	M15 Monastir, Tunisia	World Tennis Tour	Hard	(Australia) Akira Santillan	(China) Gao Xin (China) Li Zhe	6–3, 6-0
Win	26–10	Jun 2022	M15 Monastir, Tunisia	World Tennis Tour	Hard	(United Kingdom) Luke Johnson	(France) Martin Breysach (France) Arthur Bouquier	7–6^{(7–3)}, 6-3
Win	27–10	Jun 2022	M15 Monastir, Tunisia	World Tennis Tour	Hard	(Tunisia) Aziz Ouakaa	(China) Rigele Te (China) Zhang Ze	7–6^{(7–1)}, 6-2
Win	28–10	Jul 2022	M25 Bakio, Spain	World Tennis Tour	Clay	(United Kingdom) Luke Johnson	(Israel) Aaron Cohen (Spain) Àlex Martínez	1–6, 6-2, [10–5]
Loss	28–11	Jul 2022	M15 Roehampton, Great Britain	World Tennis Tour	Grass	(Switzerland) Luca Castelnuovo	(United Kingdom) Julian Cash (United Kingdom) Henry Patten	(W/O)
Win	29–11	Jul 2022	M15 Monastir, Tunisia	World Tennis Tour	Hard	(Tunisia) Aziz Ouakaa	(Australia) Ken Cavrak (Australia) Chase Ferguson	7–6^{(7–3)}, 6–3
Loss	29–12	Sep 2022	Orléans, France	Challenger	Hard (i)	(Belgium) Michael Geerts	(France) Nicolas Mahut (France) Édouard Roger-Vasselin	2–6, 4–6
Win	30–12	Apr 2023	Cuernavaca, Mexico	Challenger	Hard	(Greece) Michail Pervolarakis	(Zimbabwe) Benjamin Lock (New Zealand) Rubin Statham	6–4, 6–4
Win	31–12	May 2023	M15 Monastir, Tunisia	World Tennis Tour	Hard	(Germany) Jakob Schnaitter	(Japan) Kokoro Isomura (Japan) Yamato Sueoka	6–2, 6–0
Win	32–12	Jul 2023	Chicago, United States	Challenger	Hard	(Latvia) Mikelis Libietis	(South Korea) Chung Yun-seong (Australia) Andrew Harris	7–6^{(7–5)}, 6–3
Win	33–12	Aug 2023	M25 Idanha-a-Nova, Portugal	World Tennis Tour	Hard	(France) Dan Added	(Spain) Alberto Barroso Campos (Czech Republic) David Poljak	7–5, 6–4
Win	34–12	Sep 2023	Istanbul, Turkey	Challenger	Hard	(United Kingdom) Luke Johnson	(Netherlands) Sander Arends (Pakistan) Aisam-ul-Haq Qureshi	7–6^{(7–3)}, 6–3
Win	35–12	Sep 2023	Charleston, United States	Challenger	Hard	(United Kingdom) Luke Johnson	(United States) Nicholas Bybel (United States) Oliver Crawford	6–4, 6–4
Win	36–12	Oct 2023	Tiburon, United States	Challenger	Hard	(United Kingdom) Luke Johnson	(United States) William Blumberg (Venezuela) Luis David Martínez	6–2, 6–3
Win	37–12	Oct 2023	M15 Monastir, Tunisia	World Tennis Tour	Hard	(Tunisia) Aziz Ouakaa	(Spain) Alberto Barroso Campos; Aleksandr Lobanov	7–6^{(7–5)}, 6–1
Win	38–12	Jan 2024	Nonthaburi, Thailand	Challenger	Hard	(United Kingdom) Luke Johnson	(India) Rithvik Choudary Bollipalli (India) Niki Kaliyanda Poonacha	7–5, 6–4
Win	39–12	Jan 2024	Ottignies-Louvain-la-Neuve, Belgium	Challenger	Hard (i)	(United Kingdom) Luke Johnson	(Netherlands) Sander Arends (Netherlands) Sem Verbeek	7-5, 6-3
Loss	39–13	Apr 2024	Acapulco, Mexico	Challenger	Hard	(United Kingdom) Luke Johnson	(India) Rithvik Choudary Bollipalli (India) Niki Kaliyanda Poonacha	6–7^{(4–7)}, 5-7
Win	40–13	Apr 2024	Rome, Italy	Challenger	Clay	(United Kingdom) Luke Johnson	(Italy) Lorenzo Rottoli (Italy) Samuel Vincent Ruggeri	6–2, 6–4
Win	41–13	Apr 2024	Aix-en-Provence, France	Challenger	Clay	(United Kingdom) Luke Johnson	(Ecuador) Diego Hidalgo (Colombia) Cristian Rodríguez	6–3, 6–3
Win	42–13	Oct 2024	Brest, France	Challenger	Hard (i)	(Colombia) Nicolás Barrientos	(Switzerland) Jakub Paul (Czech Republic) Matěj Vocel	7–5, 4–6, [10–5]
Win	43–13	Apr 2026	M25 Monastir, Tunisia	World Tennis Tour	Hard	(Austria) Maximilian Neuchrist	(Italy) Federico Iannaccone (Ukraine) Georgii Kravchenko	7–6^{(7–4)}, 7–5
Win	44–13	Apr 2026	M25 Monastir, Tunisia	World Tennis Tour	Hard	(Austria) Maximilian Neuchrist	(France) César Bouchelaghem (Slovenia) Filip Jeff Planinšek	7–5, 6–2
Loss	44–14	May 2026	Brazzaville, Republic of the Congo	Challenger	Clay	(Belgium) Michael Geerts	(Venezuela) Brandon Pérez (Argentina) Franco Ribero	3–6, 4–6
Loss	44–15	Jun 2026	Lyon, France	Challenger	Clay	(Austria) Maximilian Neuchrist	(Thailand) Pruchya Isaro (India) Niki Kaliyanda Poonacha	0–6, 1–6
Win	45–15	Oct 2026	M15 Monastir, Tunisia	World Tennis Tour	Hard	(Tunisia) Aziz Ouakaa	(Spain) Samuel de Felipe Garcia (Thailand) Tanapatt Nirundorn	6–4, 7–6^{(7–5)}
Win	46–15	Nov 2026	Taranto, Italy	Challenger	Hard	(Austria) Maximilian Neuchrist	(Spain) Ignasi Forcano (Spain) Rafael Izquierdo Luque	6–4, 7–5

== Davis Cup ==
=== Participations: (10–2) ===
Group membership World Group (0–0) WG Play-off (0–0) Group I (0–0) Group II (2–2) Group III (8–0) Group IV (0–0)	Matches by surface Hard (2–1) Clay (8–0) Grass (0–0) Carpet (0–1)	Matches by type Singles (5–0) Doubles (5–2)

- ▲ ▼ indicates the outcome of the Davis Cup match followed by the score, date, place of event, the zonal classification and its phase, and the court surface.

Rubber outcome	No.	Rubber	Match type (partner if any)	Opponent nation	Opponent player(s)	Score
▲3–0; 26 October 2015; Smash Tennis Academy, Cairo, Egypt; Africa Zone Group III Pool A Round robin; Clay surface
Victory	1	I	Singles	Algeria	Youcef Ghezal	6–2, 6–0
Victory	2	III	Doubles (with Aziz Dougaz) (dead rubber)	Algeria	Mohamed Hassan / Aymen Ikhlef	6–1, 6–2
▲3–0; 27 October 2015; Smash Tennis Academy, Cairo, Egypt; Africa Zone Group III Pool A Round robin; Clay surface
Victory	3	III	Doubles (with Majed Kilani) (dead rubber)	Namibia	Jacobus Serdyn / Gideon Van Dyk	6–0, 6–2
▲2–0; 29 October 2015; Smash Tennis Academy, Cairo, Egypt; Africa Zone Group III Promotional Play-off; Clay surface
Victory	4	I	Singles	Benin	Jean Segodo	6–2, 6–0
▼1–3; 4–6 March 2016; Arena Zenica, Zenica, Bosnia and Herzegovina; Europe/Africa Zone Group II First round; Carpet (indoor) surface
Defeat	5	III	Doubles (with Malek Jaziri)	Bosnia and Herzegovina	Mirza Bašić / Tomislav Brkić	7–6^{(7–2)}, 6–4, 3–6, 5–7, 4–6
▲3–2; 15–17 July 2016; Tennis Courts of Cité Nationale Sportive, Tunis, Tunisia; Europe/Africa Zone Group II Relegation play-off; Hard surface
Victory	6	III	Doubles (with Malek Jaziri)	Bulgaria	Alexandar Lazarov / Vasko Mladenov	6–4, 6–4, 6–3
▲4–1; 7–9 April 2017; National Tennis Centre, Nicosia, Cyprus; Europe/Africa Zone Group II Relegation play-off; Hard surface
Victory	7	III	Doubles (with Malek Jaziri)	Cyprus	Marcos Baghdatis / Petros Chrysochos	7–5, 3–6, 5–7, 6–4, 7–5
▼2–3; 3–4 February 2018; Tennis Courts of Cité Nationale Sportive, Tunis, Tunisia; Europe/Africa Zone Group II First round; Hard surface
Defeat	8	V	Doubles (with Anis Ghorbel)	Finland	Harri Heliövaara / Henri Kontinen	4–6, 7–5, 2–6
▲3–0; 11 September 2019; Nairobi Club, Nairobi, Kenya; Africa Zone Group III Round robin; Clay surface
Victory	9	II	Singles	Mozambique	Franco Mata	6–1, 6–2
▲3–0; 12 September 2019; Nairobi Club, Nairobi, Kenya; Africa Zone Group III Round robin; Clay surface
Victory	10	II	Singles	Nigeria	Emmanuel Audu	6–3, 6–2
▲3–0; 13 September 2019; Nairobi Club, Nairobi, Kenya; Africa Zone Group III Round robin; Clay surface
Victory	11	III	Doubles (with Aziz Ouakaa) (dead rubber)	Namibia	Codie van Schalkwyk / Connor van Schalkwyk	6–2, 6–1
▲2–0; 14 September 2019; Nairobi Club, Nairobi, Kenya; Africa Zone Group III Promotional Play-off; Clay surface
Victory	12	II	Singles	Madagascar	Jean-Jacques Rakotohasy	6–1, 6–4

== African Games ==
=== Doubles 1 (1 victory) ===
Outcome	No.	Date	Tournament	Surface	Partner	Opponent	Score
Win	1.	29 August 2019	Rabat, Morocco	Clay	(Tunisia) Aziz Dougaz	(Morocco) Adam Moundir (Morocco) Lamine Ouahab	6–4, 7–5
