= Simen Sunde Bratholm =

Norwegian tennis player

Simen Sunde Baumann Bratholm
- Country (sports): Norway
- Born: 4 March 1999 (age 26)
- Plays: Right-handed (two-handed backhand)
- Prize money: $1,947

Singles
- Career record: 1–2 (at ATP Tour level, Grand Slam level, and in Davis Cup)
- Career titles: 0
- Highest ranking: No. 1203 (23 October 2017)
- Current ranking: No. (25 November 2019)

Doubles
- Career record: 0–1 (at ATP Tour level, Grand Slam level, and in Davis Cup)
- Career titles: 0
- Last updated on: 25 November 2019.

Simen Sunde Bratholm (born 4 March 1999) is a Norwegian tennis player.

Bratholm has a career high ATP singles ranking of 1,357 achieved on 20 March 2017.

Bratholm has represented Norway at the Davis Cup where he has a W/L record of 1–2 in singles and 0–1 in doubles.
