= Samuel Bothwell =

Irish tennis player

- Country (sports): Ireland
- Born: 21 November 1997 (age 27)
- Plays: Right-handed (two-handed backhand)
- Prize money: $4,821

Singles
- Career record: 0–0 (at ATP Tour level, Grand Slam level, and in Davis Cup)
- Career titles: 0
- Highest ranking: No. 1699 (1 August 2016)

Doubles
- Career record: 0–1 (at ATP Tour level, Grand Slam level, and in Davis Cup)
- Career titles: 0
- Highest ranking: No. 905 (6 November 2017)
- Current ranking: No. 968 (29 January 2018)
- Last updated on: 4 February 2018.

Samuel Bothwell (born 21 November 1997) is an Irish tennis player.

Bothwell has a career high ATP singles ranking of 1699 achieved on 1 August 2016. He also has a career high ATP doubles ranking of 905 achieved on 6 November 2017.

Bothwell represents Ireland at the Davis Cup, where he has a W/L record of 0–1.
