= 2013 Open BNP Paribas Banque de Bretagne – Singles =

Singles
- 2013 Open BNP Paribas Banque de Bretagne

Final
- Champion: (Romania) Marius Copil
- Runner-up: (France) Marc Gicquel
- Score: 7–6^{(11–9)}, 6–4

Events
Singles	Doubles
← 2012 ·	Open BNP Paribas Banque de Bretagne	· 2014 →

Igor Sijsling was the defending champion but decided to compete in the 2013 ABN AMRO World Tennis Tournament instead.
Marius Copil defeated Marc Gicquel 7–6^{(11–9)}, 6–4 in the final to win the title.

== Seeds ==
1. (Spain) Roberto Bautista Agut (quarterfinals)
2. (Luxembourg) Gilles Müller (second round)
3. (Belgium) Steve Darcis (semifinals)
4. (France) Édouard Roger-Vasselin (quarterfinals)
5. (Israel) Dudi Sela (semifinals)
6. (France) Kenny de Schepper (quarterfinals)
7. (Germany) Jan-Lennard Struff (first round)
8. (France) Marc Gicquel (final)

== Draw ==
=== Key ===
- Q = Qualifier
- WC = Wild card
- LL = Lucky loser
- Alt = Alternate
- SE = Special exempt
- PR = Protected ranking
- ITF = ITF entry
- JE = Junior exempt
- w/o = Walkover
- r = Retired
- d = Defaulted
- SR = Special ranking

=== Finals ===
Semifinals
8	(France) Marc Gicquel	6^{8}	6	7
3	(Belgium) Steve Darcis	7^{10}	3	5
5	(Israel) Dudi Sela	3	4
(Romania) Marius Copil	6	6

Final
8	(France) Marc Gicquel	6^{9}	4
(Romania) Marius Copil	7^{11}	6

=== Top half ===
First round
1	(Spain) R Bautista Agut	7^{7}	6
(Belgium) M Authom	6^{2}	3
(Russia) I Kunitsyn	4	6	1
WC	(France) R Jouan	6	1	6
(Germany) P Gojowczyk	6	6
(France) F Serra	4	2
Q	(Switzerland) A Bossel	4	2
8	(France) M Gicquel	6	6
3	(Belgium) S Darcis	7	7^{7}
(Germany) D Meffert	5	6^{3}
(China) D Wu	6	6
SE	(Italy) V Galović	3	4
(Slovakia) K Beck	6	7^{8}
(Czech Republic) J Mertl	3	6^{6}
(Israel) A Weintraub	4	1
6	(France) K de Schepper	6	6

Second round
1	(Spain) R Bautista Agut	6	7
WC	(France) R Jouan	3	5
(Germany) P Gojowczyk	4	3
8	(France) M Gicquel	6	6
3	(Belgium) S Darcis	6	6
(China) D Wu	2	2
(Slovakia) K Beck	7^{7}	4	4
6	(France) K de Schepper	6^{3}	6	6

Quarterfinals
1	(Spain) R Bautista Agut	6	2	3
8	(France) M Gicquel	3	6	6
3	(Belgium) S Darcis	6	6
6	(France) K de Schepper	4	4

Semifinals
8	(France) M Gicquel	6^{8}	6	7
3	(Belgium) S Darcis	7^{10}	3	4

=== Bottom half ===
First round
5	(Israel) D Sela	6	6
WC	(France) M Teixeira	3	2
Q	(Switzerland) H Laaksonen	4	3
(Slovakia) A Martin	6	6
(France) A Mannarino	6	6
(Belgium) Y Mertens	3	1
SE	(Poland) M Przysiężny	3^{r}
4/WC	(France) É Roger-Vasselin	5
7	(Germany) J-L Struff	2	4
(Belarus) U Ignatik	6	6
Q	(France) C Reix	6	3	6
(Germany) S Greul	3	6	3
(Romania) M Copil	7	6
Q	(Italy) R Ghedin	5	3
WC	(France) M Bourgue	6^{2}	7	6^{5}
2	(Luxembourg) G Müller	7^{7}	5	7^{7}

Second round
5	(Israel) D Sela	6	7
(Slovakia) A Martin	3	5
(France) A Mannarino	6	1	6^{3}
4/WC	(France) É Roger-Vasselin	4	6	7^{7}
(Belarus) U Ignatik	6	6
Q	(France) C Reix	1	3
(Romania) M Copil	5	6	6
2	(Luxembourg) G Müller	7	4	4

Quarterfinals
5	(Israel) D Sela	6	6
4/WC	(France) É Roger-Vasselin	2	0
(Belarus) U Ignatik	6^{5}	5
(Romania) M Copil	7^{7}	7

Semifinals
5	(Israel) D Sela	3	4
(Romania) M Copil	6	6
