= 2014 Open BNP Paribas Banque de Bretagne – Doubles =

Doubles
- 2014 Open BNP Paribas Banque de Bretagne

Final
- Champions: (France) Pierre-Hugues Herbert (France) Albano Olivetti
- Runners-up: (Croatia) Toni Androić (Croatia) Nikola Mektić
- Score: 6–4, 6–3

Events
Singles	Doubles
← 2013 ·	Open BNP Paribas Banque de Bretagne	· 2015 →

Johan Brunström and Raven Klaasen were the defending champions but decided not to participate.

Herbert and Olivetti won the title, defeating Toni Androić and Nikola Mektić in the final, 6–4, 6–3.

== Seeds ==
1. (Croatia) Marin Draganja / (Croatia) Mate Pavić (first round)
2. (United Kingdom) Ken Skupski / (United Kingdom) Neal Skupski (quarterfinals)
3. (Germany) Gero Kretschmer / (Germany) Alexander Satschko (semifinals)
4. (United Kingdom) David Rice / (United Kingdom) Sean Thornley (quarterfinals)

== Draw ==
=== Key ===
- Q = Qualifier
- WC = Wild card
- LL = Lucky loser
- Alt = Alternate
- SE = Special exempt
- PR = Protected ranking
- ITF = ITF entry
- JE = Junior exempt
- w/o = Walkover
- r = Retired
- d = Defaulted
- SR = Special ranking

=== Draw ===
First round
1	(Croatia) M Draganja (Croatia) M Pavić	4	2
(Bosnia and Herzegovina) M Bašić (Switzerland) H Laaksonen	6	6
(Croatia) T Androić (Croatia) N Mektić	w/o
(Slovakia) N Gomboš (Slovakia) A Martin
4	(United Kingdom) D Rice (United Kingdom) S Thornley	6	6
(Serbia) F Krajinović (Serbia) G Tošić	3	4
(Czech Republic) J Mertl (Romania) A Ungur	3	4
(United Kingdom) J Delgado (Luxembourg) G Müller	6	6
(France) G Burquier (France) M Rodrigues	6	6^{2}	[10]
(Netherlands) Romano Frantzen (Netherlands) T Schoorel	3	7^{7}	[7]
(France) C Lestienne (France) TK Wang
3	(Germany) G Kretschmer (Germany) A Satschko	w/o
(France) P-H Herbert (France) A Olivetti	w/o
(France) J Eysseric (France) N Renavand
(Belgium) G Gigounon (Belgium) O Rochus
2	(United Kingdom) K Skupski (United Kingdom) N Skupski	w/o

Quarterfinals
(Bosnia and Herzegovina) M Bašić (Switzerland) H Laaksonen	5	4
(Croatia) T Androić (Croatia) N Mektić	7	6
4	(United Kingdom) D Rice (United Kingdom) S Thornley	4	6	[10]
(United Kingdom) J Delgado (Luxembourg) G Müller	6	3	[12]
(Netherlands) Romano Frantzen (Netherlands) T Schoorel	4	4
3	(Germany) G Kretschmer (Germany) A Satschko	6	6
(France) P-H Herbert (France) A Olivetti	7^{7}	3	[10]
2	(United Kingdom) K Skupski (United Kingdom) N Skupski	6^{5}	6	[6]

Semifinals
(Croatia) T Androić (Croatia) N Mektić	3	7	[10]
(United Kingdom) J Delgado (Luxembourg) G Müller	6	5	[7]
3	(Germany) G Kretschmer (Germany) A Satschko	4	1
(France) P-H Herbert (France) A Olivetti	6	6

Final
(Croatia) T Androić (Croatia) N Mektić	4	3
(France) P-H Herbert (France) A Olivetti	6	6
