= 2015 Open BNP Paribas Banque de Bretagne – Singles =

Singles
- 2015 Open BNP Paribas Banque de Bretagne

Final
- Champion: (France) Benoît Paire
- Runner-up: (France) Grégoire Barrère
- Score: 6–4, 3–6, 6–4

Events
Singles	Doubles
← 2014 ·	Open BNP Paribas Banque de Bretagne	· 2016 →

Pierre-Hugues Herbert was the defending champion, but did not participate.

Benoît Paire won the title, defeating Grégoire Barrère in the final, 6–4, 3–6, 6–4.

== Seeds ==
1. (Uzbekistan) Farrukh Dustov (semifinals)
2. (France) Kenny de Schepper (second round)
3. (Germany) Andreas Beck (second round)
4. (France) Benoît Paire (champion)
5. (Ukraine) Illya Marchenko (quarterfinals)
6. (Estonia) Jürgen Zopp (first round)
7. (United Kingdom) ~~Liam Broady~~ (withdrew)
8. (Italy) Matteo Viola (first round)

== Draw ==
=== Key ===
- Q = Qualifier
- WC = Wild card
- LL = Lucky loser
- Alt = Alternate
- SE = Special exempt
- PR = Protected ranking
- ITF = ITF entry
- JE = Junior exempt
- w/o = Walkover
- r = Retired
- d = Defaulted
- SR = Special ranking

=== Finals ===
Semifinals
1	(Uzbekistan) Farrukh Dustov	4	2
4	(France) Benoît Paire	6	6
(France) David Guez	3	6	1
WC	(France) Grégoire Barrère	6	1	6

Final
4	(France) Benoît Paire	6	3	6
WC	(France) Grégoire Barrère	4	6	4

=== Top half ===
First round
1	(Uzbekistan) F Dustov	6	4	6
(Bosnia and Herzegovina) A Šetkić	4	6	2
WC	(France) M Vaïsse	7^{7}	6
LL	(Spain) A Artuñedo Martínavarro	6^{4}	4
Q	(France) Teri Groll	6	4	2
(Italy) A Arnaboldi	1	6	6
WC	(France) M Teixeira	6	6
8	(Italy) M Viola	2	4
4	(France) B Paire	6	6
(Austria) M Fischer	2	3
(Italy) R Marcora	6^{5}	6	6
Q	(France) C Hemery	7^{7}	4	4
(France) E Couacaud	2	4
Q	(Germany) D Brands	6	6
(Belgium) M Authom	7^{7}	6
6	(Estonia) J Zopp	6^{5}	3

Second round
1	(Uzbekistan) F Dustov	6	6
WC	(France) M Vaïsse	4	4
(Italy) A Arnaboldi	2	2
WC	(France) M Teixeira	6	6
4	(France) B Paire	6	3
(Italy) R Marcora	2	2^{r}
Q	(Germany) D Brands	6^{5}	4
(Belgium) M Authom	7^{7}	6

Quarterfinals
1	(Uzbekistan) F Dustov	6	6
WC	(France) M Teixeira	4	4
4	(France) B Paire	7^{7}	6
(Belgium) M Authom	6^{5}	2

Semifinals
1	(Uzbekistan) F Dustov	4	2
4	(France) B Paire	6	6

=== Bottom half ===
First round
5	(Ukraine) I Marchenko	6	6
(Japan) T Daniel	3	3
(France) L Lokoli	1	2
LL	(France) Sébastien Boltz	6	6
(France) A Michon	3	5
(France) D Guez	6	7
(Germany) P Torebko	3	3
3	(Germany) A Beck	6	6
LL	(France) Elie Rousset	3	3
SE	(Poland) A Kapaś	6	6
Q	(United Kingdom) E Corrie	6	4
(France) V Millot	4	1^{r}
(Russia) A Karatsev	3	3
WC	(France) G Barrère	6	6
(Slovakia) J Kovalík	2	7	6^{2}
2/WC	(France) K de Schepper	6	5	7^{7}

Second round
5	(Ukraine) I Marchenko	3	6	6
LL	(France) S Boltz	6	4	0
(France) D Guez	6	6^{5}	6
3	(Germany) A Beck	3	7^{7}	2
SE	(Poland) A Kapaś	6	6^{4}	4
Q	(United Kingdom) E Corrie	4	7^{7}	6
WC	(France) G Barrère	7	6
2/WC	(France) K de Schepper	5	2

Quarterfinals
5	(Ukraine) I Marchenko	7^{7}	6^{5}	2
(France) D Guez	6^{4}	7^{7}	6
Q	(United Kingdom) E Corrie	2	3
WC	(France) G Barrère	6	6

Semifinals
(France) D Guez	3	6	1
WC	(France) G Barrère	6	1	6
