= 2013 Open BNP Paribas Banque de Bretagne =

- Date: 10–16 February
- Edition: 3rd
- Draw: 32S / 16D
- Prize money: €42,550+H
- Surface: Hard
- Location: Quimper, France

Champions

Singles
- (Romania) Marius Copil

Doubles
- (Sweden) Johan Brunström / (South Africa) Raven Klaasen
← 2012 ·	Open BNP Paribas Banque de Bretagne	· 2014 →

The 2013 Open BNP Paribas Banque de Bretagne was a professional tennis tournament played on hard courts. It was the third edition of the tournament which was part of the 2013 ATP Challenger Tour. It took place in Quimper, France between 10 and 16 February 2013.

== Singles main-draw entrants ==
=== Seeds ===
Country	Player	Rank^{1}	Seed
ESP	Roberto Bautista Agut	53	1
LUX	Gilles Müller	71	2
BEL	Steve Darcis	94	3
FRA	Édouard Roger-Vasselin	98	4
ISR	Dudi Sela	107	5
FRA	Kenny de Schepper	110	6
GER	Jan-Lennard Struff	133	7
FRA	Marc Gicquel	134	8

- ^{1} Rankings as of February 4, 2013.

=== Other entrants ===
The following players received wildcards into the singles main draw:

- (France) Mathias Bourgue
- (France) Romain Jouan
- (France) Édouard Roger-Vasselin
- (France) Maxime Teixeira

The following players received entry as a special exempt into the singles main draw:

- (Italy) Viktor Galović
- (Poland) Michał Przysiężny

The following players received entry from the qualifying draw:

- (Switzerland) Adrien Bossel
- (Italy) Riccardo Ghedin
- (Switzerland) Henri Laaksonen
- (France) Clément Reix

== Doubles main-draw entrants ==
=== Seeds ===
Country	Player	Country	Player	Rank^{1}	Seed
GBR	Jamie Delgado	GBR	Ken Skupski	114	1
SWE	Johan Brunström	RSA	Raven Klaasen	130	2
THA	Sanchai Ratiwatana	THA	Sonchat Ratiwatana	162	3
POL	Tomasz Bednarek	POL	Mateusz Kowalczyk	189	4

- ^{1} Rankings as of February 4, 2013.

=== Other entrants ===
The following pairs received wildcards into the doubles main draw:

- (Belgium) Maxime Authom / (France) Charles-Antoine Brézac
- (France) Emilien Firmin / (Luxembourg) Gilles Müller
- (France) Romain Jouan / (France) Clément Reix

== Champions ==
=== Singles ===
- (Romania) Marius Copil def. (France) Marc Gicquel, 7–6^{(11–9)}, 6–4

=== Doubles ===
- (Sweden) Johan Brunström / (South Africa) Raven Klaasen def. (United Kingdom) Jamie Delgado / (United Kingdom) Ken Skupski, 3–6, 6–2, [10–3]
