= 2011 Farmers Classic – Singles Qualifying =

This article displays the qualifying draw of the 2011 Farmers Classic.

== Players ==
=== Seeds ===
1. (Japan) Tatsuma Ito (second round)
2. (South Africa) Rik de Voest (qualifying Competition, retired)
3. (Australia) Marinko Matosevic (second round)
4. (Japan) Yuichi Sugita (second round)
5. (United States) Tim Smyczek (qualified)
6. (Australia) Chris Guccione (first round)
7. (Australia) Greg Jones (qualified)
8. (Australia) Carsten Ball (second round)

=== Qualifiers ===
1. (United States) Daniel Kosakowski
2. (United States) Tim Smyczek
3. (Lithuania) Laurynas Grigelis
4. (Australia) Greg Jones

== Qualifying draw ==
=== First qualifier ===
First Round
1	(Japan) Tatsuma Ito	6	4	7^{7}
(United Kingdom) Alex Bogdanovic	4	6	6^{4}
(United States) Daniel Kosakowski	6	6
(Latvia) Kārlis Lejnieks	1	2
WC	(United States) Zack Fleishman	2	1^{r}
(Sierra Leone) Sahr Timothy Kpulun	6	3
(United States) Denis Kudla	7^{7}	6
6	(Australia) Chris Guccione	6^{4}	4

Second Round
1	(Japan) Tatsuma Ito	0	2
(United States) Daniel Kosakowski	6	6
(Sierra Leone) Sahr Timothy Kpulun	1	2
(United States) Denis Kudla	6	6

Qualifying Competition
(United States) Daniel Kosakowski	6	7^{7}
(United States) Denis Kudla	4	6^{4}

=== Second qualifier ===
First Round
2	(South Africa) Rik de Voest	6	6
WC	(United States) Alex Kim	4	3
(Brazil) Marcelo Melo	6	6
(United Kingdom) Jamie Murray	2	0
(United States) Marcos Giron	6	4	4
(New Zealand) Artem Sitak	0	6	6
WC	(Philippines) Cecil Mamiit	2	2
5	(United States) Tim Smyczek	6	6

Second Round
2	(South Africa) Rik de Voest	6	6^{4}	6
(Brazil) Marcelo Melo	2	7^{7}	0
(New Zealand) Artem Sitak	3	3
5	(United States) Tim Smyczek	6	6

Qualifying Competition
2	(South Africa) Rik de Voest	6	4	0^{r}
5	(United States) Tim Smyczek	3	6	1

=== Third qualifier ===
First Round
3	(Australia) Marinko Matosevic	6	6
(United States) Marcin Kosakowski	0	1
(United States) Aaron Yovan	4	4
(France) Clément Reix	6	6
(Lithuania) Laurynas Grigelis	6	6
(United States) Phillip Simmonds	1	3
(Spain) Luis Antonio Pérez-Pérez	3	2
8	(Australia) Carsten Ball	6	6

Second Round
3	(Australia) Marinko Matosevic	3	6^{6}
(France) Clément Reix	6	7^{8}
(Lithuania) Laurynas Grigelis	6	6
8	(Australia) Carsten Ball	4	4

Qualifying Competition
(France) Clément Reix	2	3
(Lithuania) Laurynas Grigelis	6	6

=== Fourth qualifier ===
First Round
4	(Japan) Yuichi Sugita	4	6	6
WC	(United States) Clay Thompson	6	4	3
(Israel) Harel Srugo	5	2
(Chile) Nicolás Massú	7	6
(United States) Bradley Klahn	6	6
(Brazil) Bruno Semenzato	4	3
(United States) Michael McClune	6^{3}	3
7	(Australia) Greg Jones	7^{7}	6

Second Round
4	(Japan) Yuichi Sugita	6	5	6^{5}
(Chile) Nicolás Massú	4	7	7^{7}
(United States) Bradley Klahn	4	7	4
7	(Australia) Greg Jones	6	5	6

Qualifying Competition
(Chile) Nicolás Massú	4	0
7	(Australia) Greg Jones	6	6
