= 2013 Open BNP Paribas Banque de Bretagne – Doubles =

Doubles
- 2013 Open BNP Paribas Banque de Bretagne

Final
- Champions: (Sweden) Johan Brunström (South Africa) Raven Klaasen
- Runners-up: (United Kingdom) Jamie Delgado (United Kingdom) Ken Skupski
- Score: 3–6, 6–2, [10–3]

Events
Singles	Doubles
- Open BNP Paribas Banque de Bretagne

Pierre-Hugues Herbert and Maxime Teixeira were the defending champions but decided not to participate.
Johan Brunström and Raven Klaasen won the final 3–6, 6–2, [10–3] against Jamie Delgado and Ken Skupski.

== Seeds ==
1. (United Kingdom) Jamie Delgado / (United Kingdom) Ken Skupski (final)
2. (Sweden) Johan Brunström / (South Africa) Raven Klaasen (champions)
3. (Thailand) Sanchai Ratiwatana / (Thailand) Sonchat Ratiwatana (first round)
4. (Poland) Tomasz Bednarek / (Poland) Mateusz Kowalczyk (first round)

== Draw ==
Key

- Q = Qualifier
- WC = Wild card
- LL = Lucky loser
- Alt = Alternate
- ITF = ITF entry
- PR = Protected ranking
- SR = Special ranking
- SE = Special exempt
- JE = Junior exempt
- JR = Junior Accelerator Programme entrant
- CO = College Accelerator Programme entrant
- NG = Next Gen Accelerator Program entrant
- w/o = Walkover
- r = Retired
- d = Defaulted

=== Draw ===
First round
1	(United Kingdom) J Delgado (United Kingdom) K Skupski	6	6
WC	(France) Emilien Firmin (Luxembourg) G Müller	4	3
(Germany) P Gojowczyk (Germany) J-L Struff	2	4
WC	(Belgium) M Authom (France) Charles-Antoine Brézac	6	6
4	(Poland) T Bednarek (Poland) M Kowalczyk	7^{7}	2	[4]
(Israel) D Sela (Israel) A Weintraub	6^{4}	6	[10]
(Belarus) U Ignatik (China) D Wu	7^{9}	3	[8]
(Germany) D Meffert (Austria) P Oswald	6^{7}	6	[10]
WC	(France) R Jouan (France) C Reix	7	6
(Italy) A Motti (Montenegro) G Tošić	5	3
(Australia) J Kerr (Sweden) A Siljeström	7	7^{7}
3	(Thailand) Sa Ratiwatana (Thailand) So Ratiwatana	5	6^{5}
(Romania) A Dăescu (Czech Republic) J Mertl	4	6	[12]
(Slovakia) K Beck (Slovakia) A Martin	6	1	[10]
(Australia) R Junaid (Slovakia) I Zelenay	4	7^{7}	[9]
2	(Sweden) J Brunström (South Africa) R Klaasen	6	6^{3}	[11]

Quarterfinals
1	(United Kingdom) J Delgado (United Kingdom) K Skupski	7	2	[10]
WC	(Belgium) M Authom (France) C-A Brézac	5	6	[2]
(Israel) D Sela (Israel) A Weintraub	1	4
(Germany) D Meffert (Austria) P Oswald	6	6
WC	(France) R Jouan (France) C Reix	6	4	[10]
(Australia) J Kerr (Sweden) A Siljeström	3	6	[8]
(Romania) A Dăescu (Czech Republic) J Mertl	6^{6}	4
2	(Sweden) J Brunström (South Africa) R Klaasen	7^{8}	6

Semifinals
1	(United Kingdom) J Delgado (United Kingdom) K Skupski	7^{7}	6
(Germany) D Meffert (Austria) P Oswald	6^{3}	1
WC	(France) R Jouan (France) C Reix	4	4
2	(Sweden) J Brunström (South Africa) R Klaasen	6	6

Final
1	(United Kingdom) J Delgado (United Kingdom) K Skupski	6	2	[3]
2	(Sweden) J Brunström (South Africa) R Klaasen	3	6	[10]
