= 2015 Open BNP Paribas Banque de Bretagne – Doubles =

Doubles
- 2015 Open BNP Paribas Banque de Bretagne

Final
- Champions: (Italy) Flavio Cipolla (Germany) Dominik Meffert
- Runners-up: (Germany) Martin Emmrich (Sweden) Andreas Siljeström
- Score: 3–6, 7–6^{(7–5)}, [10–8]

Events
Singles	Doubles
← 2014 ·	Open BNP Paribas Banque de Bretagne	· 2016 →

Pierre-Hugues Herbert and Albano Olivetti were the defending champions, but chose not to participate.

Flavio Cipolla and Dominik Meffert won the title, defeating Martin Emmrich and Andreas Siljeström in the final, 3–6, 7–6^{(7–5)}, [10–8].

== Seeds ==
1. (Germany) Martin Emmrich / (Sweden) Andreas Siljeström (final)
2. (Australia) Rameez Junaid / (Germany) Frank Moser (first round)
3. (United Kingdom) Ken Skupski / (United Kingdom) Neal Skupski (first round)
4. (Italy) Flavio Cipolla / (Germany) Dominik Meffert (champions)

== Draw ==
=== Key ===
- Q = Qualifier
- WC = Wild card
- LL = Lucky loser
- Alt = Alternate
- SE = Special exempt
- PR = Protected ranking
- ITF = ITF entry
- JE = Junior exempt
- w/o = Walkover
- r = Retired
- d = Defaulted
- SR = Special ranking

First round
1	(Germany) M Emmrich (Sweden) A Siljeström	6	6
Alt	(France) D Guez (France) M Vaïsse	1	1
(Italy) A Arnaboldi (Italy) M Viola	3	6	[3]
WC	(France) A Michon (France) M Teixeira	6	4	[10]
3	(United Kingdom) K Skupski (United Kingdom) N Skupski	4	6	[7]
WC	(Belgium) M Authom (France) R Jouan	6	3	[10]
(Czech Republic) R Jebavý (Estonia) J Zopp	3	4
(France) K de Schepper (France) F Martin	6	6
(Netherlands) S Arends (United Kingdom) D Walsh	6	6
(Poland) A Kapaś (France) Elie Rousset	4	3
(United Kingdom) E Corrie (United Kingdom) S Thornley	5	6	[7]
4	(Italy) F Cipolla (Germany) D Meffert	7	2	[10]
(Germany) A Beck (Austria) M Fischer	6	6
(United States) J Cerretani (Romania) P Grigoriu	4	4
WC	(France) G Barrère (France) Julien Obry	6	6
2	(Australia) R Junaid (Germany) Frank Moser	3	3

Quarterfinals
1	(Germany) M Emmrich (Sweden) A Siljeström	7^{8}	7^{7}
WC	(France) A Michon (France) M Teixeira	6^{6}	6^{5}
WC	(Belgium) M Authom (France) R Jouan	6	6
(France) K de Schepper (France) F Martin	4	2
(Netherlands) S Arends (United Kingdom) D Walsh	4	6^{5}
4	(Italy) F Cipolla (Germany) D Meffert	6	7^{7}
(Germany) A Beck (Austria) M Fischer	7^{7}	4	[10]
WC	(France) G Barrère (France) J Obry	6^{3}	6	[5]

Semifinals
1	(Germany) M Emmrich (Sweden) A Siljeström	6	7^{12}
WC	(Belgium) M Authom (France) R Jouan	3	6^{10}
4	(Italy) F Cipolla (Germany) D Meffert	4	7	[10]
(Germany) A Beck (Austria) M Fischer	6	5	[4]

Final
1	(Germany) M Emmrich (Sweden) A Siljeström	6	6^{5}	[8]
4	(Italy) F Cipolla (Germany) D Meffert	3	7^{7}	[10]
