= 2014 Open BNP Paribas Banque de Bretagne =

- Date: 10–16 February
- Edition: 4th
- Draw: 32S / 16D
- Prize money: €42,500+H
- Surface: Hard
- Location: Quimper, France

Champions

Singles
- (France) Pierre-Hugues Herbert

Doubles
- (France) Pierre-Hugues Herbert / (France) Albano Olivetti
← 2013 ·	Open BNP Paribas Banque de Bretagne	· 2015 →

The 2014 Open BNP Paribas Banque de Bretagne was a professional tennis tournament played on hard courts. It was the fourth edition of the tournament which was part of the 2014 ATP Challenger Tour. It took place in Quimper, France between 10 and 16 February 2014.

== Singles main-draw entrants ==
=== Seeds ===
Country	Player	Rank^{1}	Seed
ROU	Adrian Ungur	122	1
FRA	Marc Gicquel	127	2
ROU	Marius Copil	132	3
SVK	Andrej Martin	134	4
FRA	Guillaume Rufin	144	5
GBR	James Ward	156	6
FRA	Pierre-Hugues Herbert	160	7
SVK	Norbert Gombos	191	8

- ^{1} Rankings as of February 3, 2014.

=== Other entrants ===
The following players received wildcards into the singles main draw:

- (France) Jonathan Eysseric
- (France) Quentin Halys
- (Luxembourg) Gilles Müller
- (France) Josselin Ouanna

The following players received entry from the qualifying draw:

- (France) Mathieu Rodrigues
- (France) Jules Marie
- (France) Rudy Coco
- (France) Gleb Sakharov

== Champions ==
=== Singles ===
- (France) Pierre-Hugues Herbert def. (France) Vincent Millot, 7–5, 6–4

=== Doubles ===
- (France) Pierre-Hugues Herbert / (France) Albano Olivetti def. (Croatia) Toni Androić / (Croatia) Nikola Mektić, 6–4, 6–3
