= 2015 Open BNP Paribas Banque de Bretagne =

- Date: 2–8 March
- Edition: 5th
- Draw: 32S / 16D
- Prize money: €42,500+H
- Surface: Hard
- Location: Quimper, France

Champions

Singles
- (France) Benoît Paire

Doubles
- (Italy) Flavio Cipolla / (Germany) Dominik Meffert
| ← 2014 · | Open BNP Paribas Banque de Bretagne | · 2016 → |

The 2015 Open BNP Paribas Banque de Bretagne was a professional tennis tournament played on hard courts. It was the fifth edition of the tournament which was part of the 2015 ATP Challenger Tour. It took place in Quimper, France between 2 and 8 March 2015.

== Singles main-draw entrants ==
=== Seeds ===
| Country | Player | Rank^{1} | Seed |
|---|---|---|---|
| UZB | Farrukh Dustov | 98 | 1 |
| FRA | Kenny de Schepper | 103 | 2 |
| GER | Andreas Beck | 114 | 3 |
| FRA | Benoît Paire | 118 | 4 |
| UKR | Illya Marchenko | 127 | 5 |
| EST | Jürgen Zopp | 157 | 6 |
| GBR | Liam Broady | 181 | 7 |
| ITA | Matteo Viola | 193 | 8 |

- ^{1} Rankings as of February 23, 2015.

=== Other entrants ===
The following players received wildcards into the singles main draw:

- (France) Grégoire Barrère
- (France) Kenny de Schepper
- (France) Maxime Teixeira
- (France) Martin Vaïsse

The following players received entry from the qualifying draw:

- (France) Teri Groll
- (United Kingdom) Edward Corrie
- (France) Calvin Hemery
- (Germany) Daniel Brands

The following players received entry as lucky losers:

- (Spain) Andrés Artuñedo Martínavarro
- (France) Sébastien Boltz
- (France) Élie Rousset

The following players got into the singles main draw as a special exempt:

- (Poland) Andriej Kapaś

== Champions ==
=== Singles ===
- (France) Benoît Paire def. (France) Grégoire Barrère, 6–4, 3–6, 6–4

=== Doubles ===
- (Italy) Flavio Cipolla / (Germany) Dominik Meffert def. (Germany) Martin Emmrich / (Sweden) Andreas Siljeström, 3–6, 7–6^{(7–5)}, [10–8]
