= 2014 Open BNP Paribas Banque de Bretagne – Singles =

Singles
- 2014 Open BNP Paribas Banque de Bretagne

Final
- Champion: (France) Pierre-Hugues Herbert
- Runner-up: (France) Vincent Millot
- Score: 7–5, 6–4

Events
Singles	Doubles
- Open BNP Paribas Banque de Bretagne

Marius Copil was the defending champion, but lost in the quarterfinal to Pierre-Hugues Herbert.

Herbert won the title, defeating Vincent Millot in the final, 7–5, 6–4.

== Seeds ==
1. (Romania) Adrian Ungur (first round)
2. (France) Marc Gicquel (first round)
3. (Romania) Marius Copil (quarterfinals)
4. (Slovakia) Andrej Martin (first round)
5. (France) Guillaume Rufin (second round)
6. (United Kingdom) James Ward (first round)
7. (France) Pierre-Hugues Herbert (champion)
8. (Slovakia) Norbert Gomboš (first round)

== Draw ==
Key

- Q = Qualifier
- WC = Wild card
- LL = Lucky loser
- Alt = Alternate
- ITF = ITF entry
- PR = Protected ranking
- SR = Special ranking
- SE = Special exempt
- JE = Junior exempt
- JR = Junior Accelerator Programme entrant
- CO = College Accelerator Programme entrant
- NG = Next Gen Accelerator Program entrant
- w/o = Walkover
- r = Retired
- d = Defaulted

=== Finals ===
Semifinals
(France) Grégoire Burquier	5	4
(France) Vincent Millot	7	6
7	(France) Pierre-Hugues Herbert	6	6^{2}	7^{7}
WC	(Luxembourg) Gilles Müller	5	7^{7}	6^{5}

Final
(France) Vincent Millot	6^{5}	3
7	(France) Pierre-Hugues Herbert	7^{7}	6

=== Top half ===
First round
1	(Romania) A Ungur	6^{4}	4
(France) J Ouanna	7^{7}	6
(France) G Burquier	6
(Belgium) G Gigounon	1^{r}
(Croatia) T Androić	5	6^{3}
Q	(France) M Rodrigues	7	7^{7}
(Belgium) M Authom	6	6
6	(United Kingdom) J Ward	2	2
4	(Slovakia) A Martin	6^{3}	6	5
(Bosnia and Herzegovina) M Bašić	7^{7}	4	7
(Morocco) L Ouahab	6^{5}	3
(France) A Olivetti	7^{7}	6
(Serbia) F Krajinović	3	3
(France) V Millot	6	6
(Belgium) O Rochus	3	4
5	(France) G Rufin	6	6

Second round
(France) J Ouanna	6^{4}	6^{3}
(France) G Burquier	7^{7}	7^{7}
Q	(France) M Rodrigues	6	2
(Belgium) M Authom	3	1^{r}
(Bosnia and Herzegovina) M Bašić	3	6^{3}
(France) A Olivetti	6	7^{7}
(France) V Millot	6	7^{7}
5	(France) G Rufin	4	6^{4}

Quarterfinals
(France) G Burquier	6	7^{7}
Q	(France) M Rodrigues	2	6^{5}
(France) A Olivetti	6	3	5
(France) V Millot	3	5	7

Semifinals
(France) G Burquier	5	4
(France) V Millot	7	6

=== Bottom half ===
First round
7	(France) P-H Herbert	6^{5}	6	6
Q	(France) Jules Marie	7^{7}	3	3
(France) F Serra	6	7
LL	(France) TK Wang	3	5
Q	(France) Rudy Coco	7^{7}	6^{1}	6
(Netherlands) T Schoorel	6^{5}	7^{7}	4
(France) M Teixeira	6	4	6^{6}
3	(Romania) M Copil	4	6	7^{8}
8	(Slovakia) N Gomboš	4	4
WC	(Luxembourg) G Müller	6	6
WC	(France) J Eysseric	6	6^{2}	6
Q	(France) G Sakharov	3	7^{7}	2
(Czech Republic) J Mertl	7^{7}	6
WC	(France) Q Halys	6^{5}	1
(Switzerland) H Laaksonen	6	6
2	(France) M Gicquel	4	1

Second round
7	(France) P-H Herbert	6^{3}	6	7^{7}
(France) F Serra	7^{7}	4	6^{4}
Q	(France) Rudy Coco	6	5	3
3	(Romania) M Copil	4	7	6
WC	(Luxembourg) G Müller	6	6^{5}	6
WC	(France) J Eysseric	1	7^{7}	1
(Czech Republic) J Mertl	6	6
(Switzerland) H Laaksonen	4	4

Quarterfinals
7	(France) P-H Herbert	7^{7}	7^{7}
3	(Romania) M Copil	6^{5}	6^{3}
WC	(Luxembourg) G Müller	7^{9}	7^{8}
(Czech Republic) J Mertl	6^{7}	6^{6}

Semifinals
7	(France) P-H Herbert	6	6^{2}	7^{7}
WC	(Luxembourg) G Müller	4	7^{7}	6^{5}
