= Clément Reix =

French tennis player

- Country (sports): France
- Born: 9 October 1983 (age 41)
- Plays: Right-handed
- Prize money: $85,511

Singles
- Career record: 112–109
- Career titles: 0
- Highest ranking: No. 250 (29 August 2011)

Grand Slam singles results
- Australian Open: Q1 (2011)
- US Open: Q1 (2011, 2012)

Doubles
- Career record: 73–68
- Career titles: 0
- Highest ranking: No. 437 (21 July 2008)
- Last updated on: 10 April 2016.

Clément Reix (born 9 October 1983) is a French retired professional tennis player. He reached the second round of the 2012 Moselle Open as a qualifier.
