= Pierre-Hugues Herbert =

French tennis player (born 1991)

- Herbert at the 2026 Wimbledon Championships
- Country (sports): France
- Residence: Develier, Switzerland
- Born: 18 March 1991 (age 35) Schiltigheim, Alsace, France
- Height: 1.88 m (6 ft 2 in)
- Turned pro: 2010
- Plays: Right-handed (two-handed backhand)
- Coach: Fabrice Santoro; Benjamin Balleret; Jean-Roch Herbert
- Prize money: US $10,590,946

Singles
- Career record: 105–138
- Career titles: 0
- Highest ranking: No. 36 (11 February 2019)
- Current ranking: No. 250 (9 November 2026)

Grand Slam singles results
- Australian Open: 3R (2016, 2019)
- French Open: 3R (2018)
- Wimbledon: 3R (2016)
- US Open: 2R (2018)

Doubles
- Career record: 256–121
- Career titles: 26
- Highest ranking: No. 2 (11 July 2016)
- Current ranking: No. 28 (9 November 2026)

Grand Slam doubles results
- Australian Open: W (2019)
- French Open: W (2018, 2021)
- Wimbledon: W (2016)
- US Open: W (2015)

Other doubles tournaments
- Tour Finals: W (2019, 2021)
- Olympic Games: 1R (2016, 2020)

Grand Slam mixed doubles results
- French Open: SF (2016)

Other mixed doubles tournaments
- Olympic Games: 1R (2016, 2020)

Team competitions
- Davis Cup: W (2017)
- Last updated on: 15 November 2026.

Pierre-Hugues Herbert (French pronunciation: [pjɛʁ yɡ ɛʁbɛʁ]; born 18 March 1991) is a French professional tennis player. He has been ranked world No. 2 in doubles by the ATP, achieved in July 2016. In doubles, Herbert has completed the career Grand Slam with titles at the 2015 US Open, the 2016 Wimbledon Championships, the 2018 French Open, the 2021 French Open, and the 2019 Australian Open partnering Nicolas Mahut. He has also won eight ATP Masters 1000 titles and two ATP Finals titles (in 2019 and 2021).

In singles, Herbert has reached four ATP Tour finals and achieved his career-high singles ranking of world No. 36 in February 2019.

== Career ==
=== 2009: Juniors ===
Herbert won the Wimbledon boys' doubles title with partner Kevin Krawietz in 2009, beating French duo of Julien Obry and Adrien Puget in the final. He also reached the 2009 US Open boys' singles semifinals, where he lost to eventual champion Bernard Tomic of Australia. Herbert reached as high as No. 9 in the junior singles rankings in October 2009.

=== 2013–2014: Masters and Grand Slam singles debuts ===
After beginning the year outside the top 250, Herbert rose steadily up the rankings. He qualified for the 2013 Paris Masters, where he defeated Benoît Paire for the loss of only four games in the first round of the main draw – his first ever ATP Tour main draw win. In the second round, he had two set points before losing to Novak Djokovic in straight sets. He ended the year with an ATP singles ranking of 151, compared with 257 12 months earlier.

Herbert made his Grand Slam main draw debut in 2014, first receiving a wildcard into the French Open, where he faced American number 10 seed John Isner in his opening match, losing in three tight sets. He then made it through three rounds of qualifying, beating Borna Ćorić, Daniel Kosakowski and Miloslav Mečíř Jr. to make the main draw at 2014 Wimbledon for the first time. In the first round he faced Jack Sock, however lost in four sets despite taking the first set in a tiebreaker. Herbert got his fifth career main draw win at the ATP Tour level at the Swiss Indoors in Basel, beating Édouard Roger-Vasselin in a tight three-setter to set up a clash with 14-time Grand Slam winner Rafael Nadal, his first meeting with a Major champion and former world number 1.

=== 2015: US Open Men's doubles champion ===
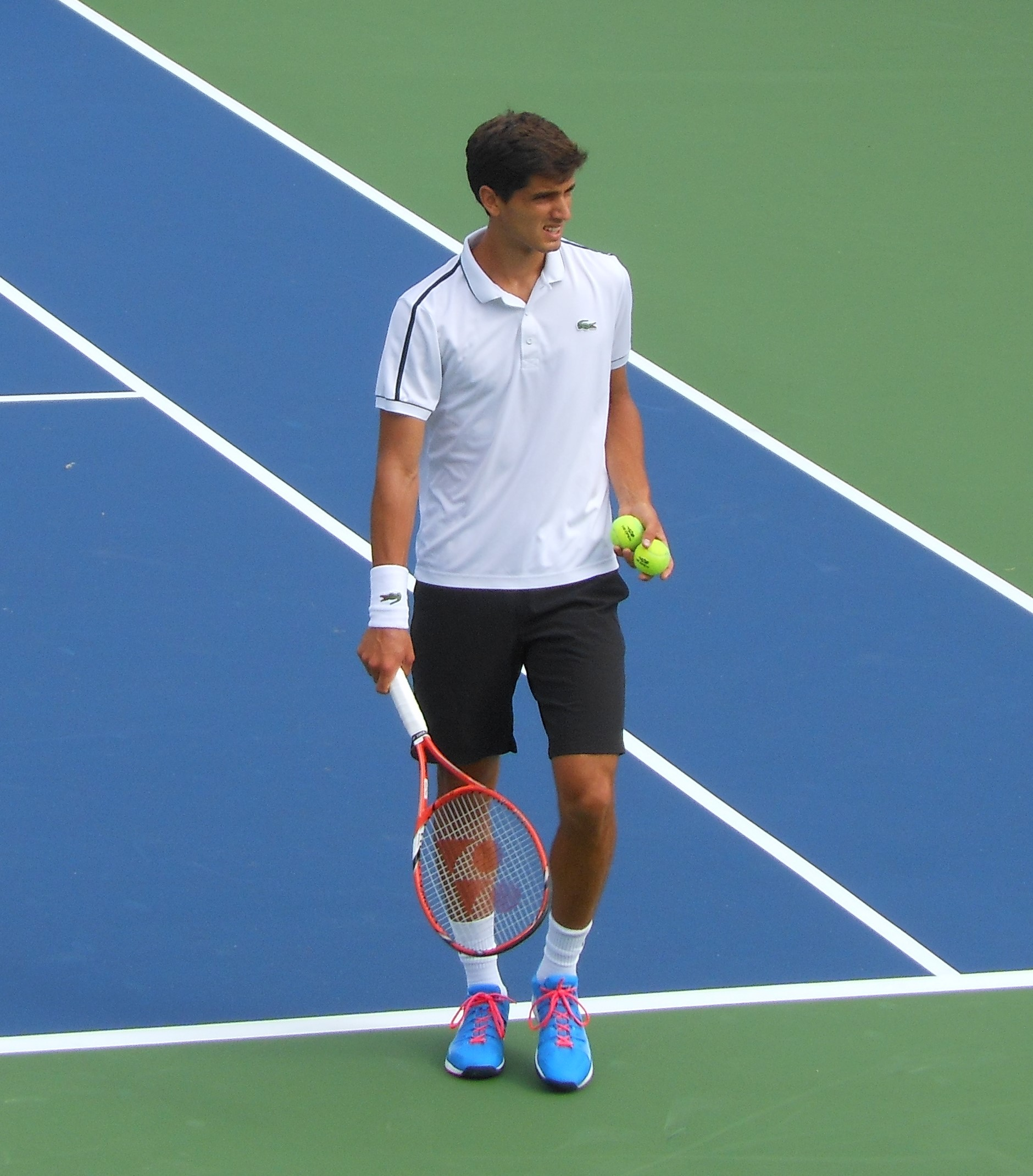
Herbert at the 2015 Winston-Salem Open

Herbert again battled through three rounds of qualifying, beating Hans Podlipnik Castillo, Facundo Argüello and Íñigo Cervantes (the latter over five sets) to make the main draw of Wimbledon. In the first round he beat Hyeon Chung in a three-hour, five-set match, clinching the final set 10–8, claiming his first win in the main draw of a grand slam. In the second round, he lost in straight sets to Bernard Tomic, the player who had beaten him in the semi-finals of Junior US Open in 2009.

In doubles, Herbert reached two Grand Slam finals alongside fellow Frenchman Nicolas Mahut. At the Australian Open, they lost the final to Fabio Fognini and Simone Bolelli. At the US Open, they won the final against Jamie Murray and John Peers, becoming the first all-French pair to win the men's doubles title at the US Open. Their US Open victory marked the sixth time that an all-French pair had won a Grand Slam men's doubles title in the Open Era. On 22 June, Herbert broke into the top 20 in doubles for the first time, reaching a career high of No. 20 in the world.

=== 2016: Wimbledon doubles champion, World No. 2 ===
Herbert and Nicolas Mahut won three ATP World Tour Masters 1000 doubles titles in a row in the first half of 2016, in Indian Wells, Miami, and Monte Carlo. At the French Open, he and Mahut, seeded no.1, lost in the third round to Feliciano López and Marc López.

At the 2016 Wimbledon Championships, Herbert and Mahut beat Julien Benneteau and Édouard Roger-Vasselin in the all-French final to win their second grand slam tournament as a team.

=== 2017: Davis Cup champion ===
At the 2017 Rotterdam Open, Herbert defeated world no. 8 Dominic Thiem in the quarterfinals for his first singles win over a Top 10-ranked player. He lost his semifinal to David Goffin.

Herbert and doubles partner Nicolas Mahut won their first title of 2017 together at the Rome Masters defeating Ivan Dodig and Marcel Granollers. They then went on to clinch the Montreal-Cincinnati double winning both of the masters events back-to-back, defeating Rohan Bopanna and Ivan Dodig in three sets at the Coupe Rogers in Montreal and defeating Jamie Murray and Bruno Soares in two sets at the Western & Southern Open in Cincinnati.

In the Davis Cup final against Belgium, Herbert and Richard Gasquet won the doubles match to help France win the Davis Cup.

=== 2018: French Open doubles champion ===
At the 2018 French Open, Hebert and doubles partner Mahut won the French Open, defeating Oliver Marach and Mate Pavić in the final. This was their third Grand Slam title together.

At the 2018 ATP Finals in November Herbert at Mahut progressed past the round robin stage of the tournament for the first time in four attempts, they reached the finals before being defeated by Jack Sock and Mike Bryan.

=== 2019: Career doubles Grand Slam, ATP Finals title, top 40 in singles ===
In Doha, Herbert's first tournament of the year, he recorded his second top-ten win against Dominic Thiem, before falling to Tomáš Berdych in the quarterfinals. In doubles in Doha Herbert partnered with David Goffin to capture their first team title together.

At the Australian Open in January, Herbert and doubles partner Mahut earned the Career Grand Slam in men's doubles after defeating Henri Kontinen and John Peers in the final. In singles Herbert reached the third round by defeating Hyeon Chung in the second round. In the third round he fell to Milos Raonic in three sets.

After winning the career grand slam in doubles, Herbert decided to take a brief break from doubles to focus on singles.

In February Herbert reached a career high ranking in singles of No. 36 on 11 February 2019 after he reached his third ATP tour final at the 2019 Open Sud de France in Montpellier, where he fell to countryman Jo-Wilfred Tsonga.

In the 2019 clay season in Monte-Carlo Herbert captured his third top 10 win against Kei Nishikori to reach the third round. At the French Open Herbert recovered from being down two-sets-to-love in a five sets match against 12th seed Daniil Medvedev in the first round.

Herbert reunited with Nicolas Mahut to play the Paris Rolex Masters which they won defeating Karen Khachanov and Andrey Rublev in the final. The pair qualified for the ATP finals for the 5th straight year, where they went undefeated in the round robin stage, and then went on to lift the trophy, without dropping a set throughout the tournament. They defeated Raven Klaasen and Michael Venus in the final.

=== 2020: ATP singles quarterfinals, ATP 500 doubles title ===
Herbert began the 2020 season at the Qatar ExxonMobil Open. He reached the quarterfinals and lost to second seed and eventual champion, Andrey Rublev. At the Australian Open, he was defeated in the second round by 11th seed David Goffin.

In Montpellier, Herbert upset fifth seed Félix Auger-Aliassime in the second round. He was eliminated in the quarterfinals by second seed David Goffin. At the Rotterdam Open, he played doubles alongside Mahut. They captured their second Rotterdam crown together by beating Henri Kontinen/Jan-Lennard Struff in the final.

=== 2021: Second French Open and ATP Finals titles, ATP singles final ===
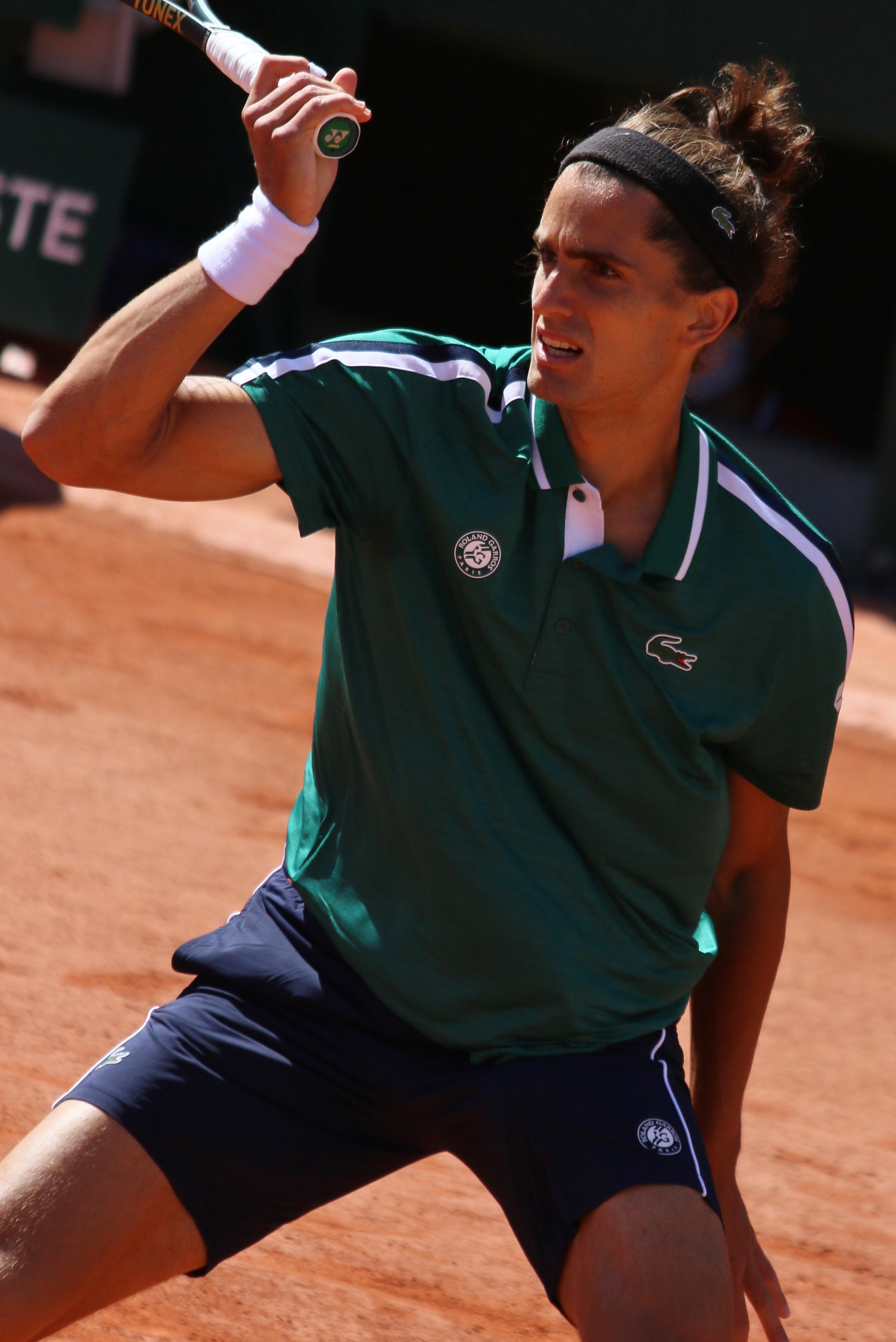
Herbert at the 2021 French Open

Herbert started his 2021 season at the Antalya Open. He lost in the first round to second seed David Goffin. At the first edition of the Great Ocean Road Open, he was defeated in the second round by 11th seed Jordan Thompson. At the Australian Open, he was eliminated in the first round by 16th seed Fabio Fognini. In Rotterdam, Herbert was beaten in the final round of qualifying by Márton Fucsovics, who would end up reaching the final.

At the Open 13 in Marseille, he had a great tournament. He won his first two rounds over Kei Nishikori and Cameron Norrie. He then stunned second seed and two-time defending champion, Stefanos Tsitsipas, in the quarterfinals. This was also his first win over a Top-5 ranked player. His victory over fourth seed Ugo Humbert in the semifinals guaranteed him a spot into his fourth ATP singles final. He lost in the championship match to top seed Daniil Medvedev in three sets.

Competing at the Miami Open, he was defeated in the second round by 11th seed Félix Auger-Aliassime.

Starting his clay-court season at the Monte-Carlo Masters, Herbert fell in the first round of qualifying to Bernard Tomic. Playing in Barcelona, he was eliminated from the tournament in the second round by eighth seed David Goffin. At the Estoril Open, he was beaten in the second round by seventh seed and eventual champion, Albert Ramos Viñolas. Getting past qualifying at the Madrid Open, he lost in the first round to Spaniard Alejandro Davidovich Fokina in three sets. At the Lyon Open, he was defeated in the first round by Sebastian Korda. However, in doubles, he and Mahut reached the final where they lost to Hugo Nys/Tim Pütz.

At the second Grand Slam of the year, the French Open, he pushed 18th seed Jannik Sinner to five sets, but he ended up losing their first-round match. In doubles, he and Mahut reached the final for the second time in their career. The home favorites saved three match points en route to the final defeating second seeds Juan Sebastián Cabal/Robert Farah. They then defeated pair Alexander Bublik/Andrey Golubev to claim their second French Open doubles title. As a result, Herbert returned to the top 10 doubles rankings at No. 7.

At Wimbledon, Herbert faced Pablo Andújar in the first round. He fought hard and pushed Andújar to five sets but ended up losing the match.

In August, Herbert competed at the Winston-Salem Open. He fell in the final round of qualifying to Wu Tung-lin. However, due to the withdrawal of Nikoloz Basilashvili, he received entry into the main draw as a lucky loser. He reached the third round where he lost to American Marcos Giron. At the US Open, he was defeated in the first round by Adrian Mannarino. In doubles, he and Mahut reached the quarterfinals losing to John Peers/Filip Polášek.

Seeded eighth at the Open d'Orléans, Herbert fell in the second round to Ruben Bemelmans. In doubles, he and compatriot, Albano Olivetti, won the title beating Antoine Hoang/Kyrian Jacquet in the final. Seeded sixth at the Internationaux de Tennis de Vendée, he was beaten in the quarterfinals by qualifier Mats Rosenkranz. In Antwerp, he lost in the final round of qualifying to Brandon Nakashima. Seeded sixth at the Brest Challenger, he was defeated in the first round by Federico Gaio. Playing in Paris as a wildcard, he lost in the first round to Carlos Alcaraz.

=== 2022–2025: 100th singles career win, 25th doubles title ===
In December 2021, Herbert announced that he was unvaccinated against COVID-19 and would miss the 2022 Australian Open as a result. He was replaced as[Nicolas Mahut's doubles partner by Fabrice Martin.

In Montpelier he won as top seed his 23rd title with partner Mahut defeating L. Glasspool/H. Heliövaara. It was their 21st title as a team.

At the 2023 Moselle Open in Metz he recorded his 100th singles career win over Luca Van Assche to reach the semifinals. It was his first ATP tour singles win in more the 20 months and first semifinal since Marseille 2021.

Playing with Albano Olivetti, Herbert was runner-up at the 2024 Moselle Open, losing to Sander Arends and Luke Johnson in the final.

=== 2026: Second Paris Masters doubles title ===
Herbert qualified for the main draw of the 2026 French Open but went on to lose his first round match in a dramatic 5 set battle against Italian journeyman Lorenzo Sonego.

== Grand Slam tournaments finals ==
=== Doubles: 6 (5 titles, 1 runner-up) ===
Result	Year	Tournament	Surface	Partner	Opponents	Score
Loss	2015	Australian Open	Hard	(France) Nicolas Mahut	(Italy) Simone Bolelli (Italy) Fabio Fognini	4–6, 4–6
Win	2015	US Open	Hard	(France) Nicolas Mahut	(United Kingdom) Jamie Murray (Australia) John Peers	6–4, 6–4
Win	2016	Wimbledon	Grass	(France) Nicolas Mahut	(France) Julien Benneteau (France) Édouard Roger-Vasselin	6–4, 7–6^{(7–1)}, 6–3
Win	2018	French Open	Clay	(France) Nicolas Mahut	(Austria) Oliver Marach (Croatia) Mate Pavić	6–2, 7–6^{(7–4)}
Win	2019	Australian Open	Hard	(France) Nicolas Mahut	(Finland) Henri Kontinen (Australia) John Peers	6–4, 7–6^{(7–1)}
Win	2021	French Open (2)	Clay	(France) Nicolas Mahut	(Kazakhstan) Alexander Bublik (Kazakhstan) Andrey Golubev	4–6, 7–6^{(7–1)}, 6–4

== Other significant finals ==
=== Year-end championships ===
==== Doubles: 3 (2 titles, 1 runner-up) ====
Result	Year	Championship	Surface	Partner	Opponents	Score
Loss	2018	ATP Finals, United Kingdom	Hard (i)	(France) Nicolas Mahut	(United States) Mike Bryan (United States) Jack Sock	7–5, 1–6, [11–13]
Win	2019	ATP Finals, United Kingdom	Hard (i)	(France) Nicolas Mahut	(South Africa) Raven Klaasen (New Zealand) Michael Venus	6–3, 6–4
Win	2021	ATP Finals, Italy (2)	Hard (i)	(France) Nicolas Mahut	(United States) Rajeev Ram (United Kingdom) Joe Salisbury	6–4, 7–6^{(7–0)}

=== ATP Masters 1000 ===
==== Doubles: 10 (8 titles, 2 runner-ups) ====
Result	Year	Tournament	Surface	Partner	Opponents	Score
Win	2016	Indian Wells Masters	Hard	(France) Nicolas Mahut	(Canada) Vasek Pospisil (United States) Jack Sock	6–3, 7–6^{(7–5)}
Win	2016	Miami Open	Hard	(France) Nicolas Mahut	(South Africa) Raven Klaasen (United States) Rajeev Ram	5–7, 6–1, [10–7]
Win	2016	Monte-Carlo Masters	Clay	(France) Nicolas Mahut	(United Kingdom) Jamie Murray (Brazil) Bruno Soares	4–6, 6–0, [10–6]
Loss	2016	Paris Masters	Hard (i)	(France) Nicolas Mahut	(Finland) Henri Kontinen (Australia) John Peers	4–6, 6–3, [6–10]
Win	2017	Italian Open	Clay	(France) Nicolas Mahut	(Croatia) Ivan Dodig (Spain) Marcel Granollers	4–6, 6–4, [10–3]
Win	2017	Canadian Open	Hard	(France) Nicolas Mahut	(India) Rohan Bopanna (Croatia) Ivan Dodig	6–4, 3–6, [10–6]
Win	2017	Cincinnati Masters	Hard	(France) Nicolas Mahut	(United Kingdom) Jamie Murray (Brazil) Bruno Soares	7–6^{(8–6)}, 6–4
Win	2019	Paris Masters	Hard (i)	(France) Nicolas Mahut	(Russia) Karen Khachanov (Russia) Andrey Rublev	6–4, 6–1
Loss	2021	Paris Masters	Hard (i)	(France) Nicolas Mahut	(Germany) Tim Pütz (New Zealand) Michael Venus	3–6, 7–6^{(7–4)}, [9–11]
Win	2026	Paris Masters (2)	Hard (i)	(France) Quentin Halys	(United States) Christian Harrison (United Kingdom) Neal Skupski	7–6^{(7–3)}, 6–7^{(4–7)}, [10–8]

== ATP Tour finals ==
=== Singles: 4 (4 runner-ups) ===
Legend Grand Slam (–) ATP 1000 (–) ATP 500 (–) ATP 250 (0–4)	Finals by surface Hard (0–4) Clay (–) Grass (–)	Finals by setting Outdoor (0–2) Indoor (0–2)

Result	W–L	Date	Tournament	Tier	Surface	Opponent	Score
Loss	0–1	Aug 2015	Winston-Salem Open, United States	ATP 250	Hard	(South Africa) Kevin Anderson	4–6, 5–7
Loss	0–2	Sep 2018	Shenzhen Open, China	ATP 250	Hard	(Japan) Yoshihito Nishioka	5–7, 6–2, 4–6
Loss	0–3	Feb 2019	Open Sud de France, France	ATP 250	Hard (i)	(France) Jo-Wilfried Tsonga	4–6, 2–6
Loss	0–4	Mar 2021	Open 13, France	ATP 250	Hard (i)	(Russia) Daniil Medvedev	4–6, 7–6^{(7–4)}, 4–6

=== Doubles: 37 (26 titles, 11 runner-ups) ===
Legend Grand Slam (5–1) ATP Finals (2–1) ATP 1000 (8–2) ATP 500 (6–1) ATP 250 (5–6)	Finals by surface Hard (18–8) Clay (4–2) Grass (4–1)	Finals by setting Outdoor (16–5) Indoor (10–6)

Result	W–L	Date	Tournament	Tier	Surface	Partner	Opponents	Score
Win	1–0	Oct 2014	Japan Open, Japan	ATP 500	Hard	(Poland) Michał Przysiężny	(Croatia) Ivan Dodig (Brazil) Marcelo Melo	6–3, 6–7^{(3–7)}, [10–5]
Loss	1–1	Jan 2015	Australian Open, Australia	Grand Slam	Hard	(France) Nicolas Mahut	(Italy) Simone Bolelli (Italy) Fabio Fognini	4–6, 4–6
Loss	1–2	Jun 2015	Rosmalen Championships, Netherlands	ATP 250	Grass	(France) Nicolas Mahut	(Croatia) Ivo Karlović (Poland) Łukasz Kubot	2–6, 6–7^{(9–11)}
Win	2–2	Jun 2015	Queen's Club Championships, United Kingdom	ATP 500	Grass	(France) Nicolas Mahut	(Poland) Marcin Matkowski (Serbia) Nenad Zimonjić	6–2, 6–2
Win	3–2	Sep 2015	US Open, United States	Grand Slam	Hard	(France) Nicolas Mahut	(United Kingdom) Jamie Murray (Australia) John Peers	6–4, 6–4
Loss	3–3	Sep 2015	Moselle Open, France	ATP 250	Hard (i)	(France) Nicolas Mahut	(Poland) Łukasz Kubot (France) Édouard Roger-Vasselin	6–2, 3–6, [7–10]
Win	4–3	Mar 2016	Indian Wells Open, United States	ATP 1000	Hard	(France) Nicolas Mahut	(Canada) Vasek Pospisil (United States) Jack Sock	6–3, 7–6^{(7–5)}
Win	5–3	Apr 2016	Miami Open, United States	ATP 1000	Hard	(France) Nicolas Mahut	(South Africa) Raven Klaasen (United States) Rajeev Ram	5–7, 6–1, [10–7]
Win	6–3	Apr 2016	Monte-Carlo Masters, France/Monaco	ATP 1000	Clay	(France) Nicolas Mahut	(United Kingdom) Jamie Murray (Brazil) Bruno Soares	4–6, 6–0, [10–6]
Win	7–3	Jun 2016	Queen's Club Championships, United Kingdom (2)	ATP 500	Grass	(France) Nicolas Mahut	(Australia) Chris Guccione (Brazil) André Sá	6–3, 7–6^{(7–5)}
Win	8–3	Jul 2016	Wimbledon Championships, United Kingdom	Grand Slam	Grass	(France) Nicolas Mahut	(France) Julien Benneteau (France) Édouard Roger-Vasselin	6–4, 7–6^{(7–1)}, 6–3
Loss	8–4	Oct 2016	European Open, Belgium	ATP 250	Hard (i)	(France) Nicolas Mahut	(Canada) Daniel Nestor (France) Édouard Roger-Vasselin	4–6, 4–6
Loss	8–5	Nov 2016	Paris Masters, France	ATP 1000	Hard (i)	(France) Nicolas Mahut	(Finland) Henri Kontinen (Australia) John Peers	4–6, 6–3, [6–10]
Win	9–5	May 2017	Italian Open, Italy	ATP 1000	Clay	(France) Nicolas Mahut	(Croatia) Ivan Dodig (Spain) Marcel Granollers	4–6, 6–4, [10–3]
Win	10–5	Aug 2017	Canadian Open, Canada	ATP 1000	Hard	(France) Nicolas Mahut	(India) Rohan Bopanna (Croatia) Ivan Dodig	6–4, 3–6, [10–6]
Win	11–5	Aug 2017	Cincinnati Open, United States	ATP 1000	Hard	(France) Nicolas Mahut	(United Kingdom) Jamie Murray (Brazil) Bruno Soares	7–6^{(8–6)}, 6–4
Loss	11–6	Jan 2018	Maharashtra Open, India	ATP 250	Hard	(France) Gilles Simon	(Netherlands) Robin Haase (Netherlands) Matwé Middelkoop	6–7^{(5–7)}, 6–7^{(5–7)}
Win	12–6	Feb 2018	Rotterdam Open, Netherlands	ATP 500	Hard (i)	(France) Nicolas Mahut	(Austria) Oliver Marach (Croatia) Mate Pavić	2–6, 6–2, [10–7]
Win	13–6	Jun 2018	French Open, France	Grand Slam	Clay	(France) Nicolas Mahut	(Austria) Oliver Marach (Croatia) Mate Pavić	6–2, 7–6^{(7–4)}
Loss	13–7	Nov 2018	ATP Finals, United Kingdom	Finals	Hard (i)	(France) Nicolas Mahut	(United States) Mike Bryan (United States) Jack Sock	7–5, 1–6, [11–13]
Win	14–7	Jan 2019	Qatar Open, Qatar	ATP 250	Hard	(Belgium) David Goffin	(Netherlands) Robin Haase (Netherlands) Matwé Middelkoop	5–7, 6–4, [10–4]
Win	15–7	Jan 2019	Australian Open, Australia	Grand Slam	Hard	(France) Nicolas Mahut	(Finland) Henri Kontinen (Australia) John Peers	6–4, 7–6^{(7–1)}
Win	16–7	Nov 2019	Paris Masters, France	ATP 1000	Hard (i)	(France) Nicolas Mahut	(Russia) Karen Khachanov (Russia) Andrey Rublev	6–4, 6–1
Win	17–7	Nov 2019	ATP Finals, United Kingdom	Finals	Hard (i)	(France) Nicolas Mahut	(South Africa) Raven Klaasen (New Zealand) Michael Venus	6–3, 6–4
Win	18–7	Feb 2020	Rotterdam Open, Netherlands (2)	ATP 500	Hard (i)	(France) Nicolas Mahut	(Finland) Henri Kontinen (Germany) Jan-Lennard Struff	7–6^{(7–5)}, 4–6, [10–7]
Win	19–7	Oct 2020	Cologne Indoors, Germany	ATP 250	Hard (i)	(France) Nicolas Mahut	(Poland) Łukasz Kubot (Brazil) Marcelo Melo	6–4, 6–4
Loss	19–8	May 2021	Lyon Open, France	ATP 250	Clay	(France) Nicolas Mahut	(Monaco) Hugo Nys (Germany) Tim Pütz	4–6, 7–5, [8–10]
Win	20–8	Jun 2021	French Open, France (2)	Grand Slam	Clay	(France) Nicolas Mahut	(Kazakhstan) Alexander Bublik (Kazakhstan) Andrey Golubev	4–6, 7–6^{(7–1)}, 6–4
Win	21–8	Jun 2021	Queen's Club Championships, United Kingdom (3)	ATP 500	Grass	(France) Nicolas Mahut	(United States) Reilly Opelka (Australia) John Peers	6–4, 7–5
Loss	21–9	Nov 2021	Paris Masters, France	ATP 1000	Hard (i)	(France) Nicolas Mahut	(Germany) Tim Pütz (New Zealand) Michael Venus	3–6, 7–6^{(7–4)}, [9–11]
Win	22–9	Nov 2021	ATP Finals, Italy (2)	Finals	Hard (i)	(France) Nicolas Mahut	(United States) Rajeev Ram (United Kingdom) Joe Salisbury	6–4, 7–6^{(7–0)}
Win	23–9	Feb 2022	Open Sud de France, France	ATP 250	Hard (i)	(France) Nicolas Mahut	(United Kingdom) Lloyd Glasspool (Finland) Harri Heliövaara	4–6, 7–6^{(7–3)}, [12–10]
Loss	23–10	Nov 2024	Moselle Open, France	ATP 250	Hard (i)	(France) Albano Olivetti	(Netherlands) Sander Arends (United Kingdom) Luke Johnson	4–6, 6–3, [3–10]
Win	24–10	Feb 2025	Open 13, France	ATP 250	Hard (i)	(France) Benjamin Bonzi	(Belgium) Sander Gillé (Poland) Jan Zieliński	6–3, 6–4
Win	25–10	Nov 2025	Moselle Open, France	ATP 250	Hard (i)	(France) Quentin Halys	(Argentina) Guido Andreozzi (France) Manuel Guinard	7–5, 6–3
Loss	25–11	Apr 2026	Barcelona Open, Spain	ATP 500	Clay	(Italy) Andrea Vavassori	(United Kingdom) Julian Cash (United Kingdom) Lloyd Glasspool	3–6, 4–6
Win	26–11	Nov 2026	Paris Masters, France (2)	ATP 1000	Hard (i)	(France) Quentin Halys	(United States) Christian Harrison (United Kingdom) Neal Skupski	7–6^{(7–3)}, 6–7^{(4–7)}, [10–8]

== ATP Challenger and ITF Tour finals ==
=== Singles: 19 (12 titles, 7 runner-ups) ===
Legend ATP Challenger Tour (6–4) ITF Futures (6–3)	Finals by surface Hard (9–5) Clay (3–2)

Result	W–L	Date	Tournament	Tier	Surface	Opponent	Score
Loss	0–1	Dec 2010	Dominican Republic F2, Santo Domingo	Futures	Hard	(Dominican Republic) Víctor Estrella Burgos	1–6, 3–6
Loss	0–2	Aug 2011	Latvia F1, Jūrmala	Futures	Clay	(Italy) Claudio Grassi	3–6, 4–6
Win	1–2	Sep 2011	France F14, Mulhouse	Futures	Hard	(France) Josselin Ouanna	6–4, 6–4
Loss	1–3	Oct 2011	Germany F16, Leimen	Futures	Hard	(Germany) Tim Pütz	3–6, 3–6
Win	2–3	Jul 2012	France F12, Montauban	Futures	Clay	(France) David Guez	7–6^{(10–8)}, 7–5
Win	3–3	Oct 2012	Israel F10, Akko	Futures	Hard	(Slovakia) Adrian Sikora	6–4, 6–2
Win	4–3	Jan 2013	France F2, Bressuire	Futures	Hard	(France) Romain Jouan	6–3, 6–2
Win	5–3	Jun 2013	Germany F7, Römerberg	Futures	Clay	(Switzerland) Alexander Ritschard	6–4, 6–4
Win	6–3	Jul 2013	France F11, Montauban	Futures	Clay	(Monaco) Benjamin Balleret	6–2, 2–6, 6–3
Win	1–0	Feb 2014	Quimper, France	Challenger	Hard	(France) Vincent Millot	7–6^{(7–5)}, 6–3
Win	2–0	Nov 2014	Mouilleron-le-Captif, France	Challenger	Hard	(Turkey) Marsel İlhan	6–2, 6–3
Win	3–0	Feb 2016	Bergamo, Italy	Challenger	Hard	(Belarus) Egor Gerasimov	6–3, 7–6^{(7–5)}
Win	4–0	Oct 2016	Orleans, France	Challenger	Hard (i)	(Slovakia) Norbert Gombos	7–5, 4–6, 6–3
Loss	4–1	Oct 2018	Ortisei, Italy	Challenger	Hard	(France) Ugo Humbert	4–6, 2–6
Win	5–1	Jan 2024	Quimper, France (2)	Challenger	Hard (i)	(Croatia) Duje Ajdukovic	6–3, 6–2
Loss	5–2	Mar 2024	Naples, Italy	Challenger	Clay	(Italy) Luca Nardi	7–5, 6–7^{(3–7)}, 2–6
Loss	5–3	Jan 2025	Quimper, France	Challenger	Hard (i)	(France) Sascha Gueymard Wayenburg	7–6^{(7–3)}, 1–6, 2–6
Win	6–3	Mar 2025	Cherbourg, France	Challenger	Hard (i)	(Netherlands) Jelle Sels	6–3, 6–4
Loss	6–4	Feb 2026	Saint-Brieuc, France	Challenger	Hard (i)	(Austria) Sebastian Ofner	4–6, 6–7^{(4–7)}

=== Doubles: 41 (32 titles, 9 runner-ups) ===
Legend ATP Challenger Tour (19–6) ITF Futures (13–3)	Finals by surface Hard (21–4) Clay (11–5)

Result	W–L	Date	Tournament	Tier	Surface	Partner	Opponents	Score
Loss	0–1	Jun 2010	France F8, Blois	Futures	Clay	(France) Xavier Pujo	(France) Jonathan Eysseric (France) Jérôme Inzerillo	3–6, 2–6
Win	1–1	Aug 2010	Germany F12, Friedberg	Futures	Clay	(United States) Nicolas Meister	(Germany) Pirmin Haenle (Australia) Joshua Crowe	4–6, 6–3, [10–6]
Win	1–0	Oct 2010	Orleans, France	Challenger	Hard	(France) Nicolas Renavand	(France) Sébastien Grosjean (France) Nicolas Mahut	7–6^{(7–3)}, 1–6, [10–6]
Win	2–1	Dec 2010	Dominican Republic F2, Santo Domingo	Futures	Hard	(Germany) Kevin Krawietz	(Venezuela) Piero Luisi (Venezuela) Román Recarte	7–6^{(7–4)}, 6–3
Win	3–1	Dec 2010	Dominican Republic F3, Santo Domingo	Futures	Hard	(France) Romain Sichez	(Latvia) Miķelis Lībietis (Latvia) Deniss Pavlovs	7–6^{(10–8)}, 6–3
Win	2–0	Mar 2011	Cherbourg, France	Challenger	Hard	(France) Nicolas Renavand	(France) Nicolas Mahut (France) Édouard Roger-Vasselin	3–6, 6–4, [10–5]
Win	4–1	Apr 2011	France F7, Grasse	Futures	Clay	(France) Nicolas Renavand	(Australia) Allen Perel (Spain) Gabriel Trujillo Soler	6–3, 6–2
Win	5–1	Jun 2011	France F8, Blois	Futures	Clay	(France) Nicolas Renavand	(Argentina) Martín Alund (Argentina) Guillermo Bujniewicz	3–6, 6–4, [10–8]
Win	6–1	Jul 2011	France F10, Montauban	Futures	Clay	(France) Nicolas Renavand	(France) Fabrice Martin (France) Alexandre Sidorenko	6–4, 6–4
Loss	2–1	Jul 2011	Tampere, Finland	Challenger	Clay	(France) Nicolas Renavand	(France) Jonathan Dasnieres De Veigy (France) David Guez	7–5, 4–6, [5–10]
Win	3–1	Sep 2011	St. Remy, France	Challenger	Hard	(France) Édouard Roger-Vasselin	(France) Nicolas Renavand (France) Arnaud Clément	6–0, 4–6, [10–7]
Win	7–1	Sep 2011	France F14, Mulhouse	Futures	Hard	(France) Albano Olivetti	(Republic of Ireland) James Cluskey (France) Fabrice Martin	6–3, 6–4
Win	4–1	Oct 2011	Orleans, France	Challenger	Hard	(France) Nicolas Renavand	(Czech Republic) David Škoch (Italy) Simone Vagnozzi	7–5, 6–3
Win	8–1	Oct 2011	France F20, Rodez	Futures	Hard	(France) Albano Olivetti	(Republic of Ireland) James Cluskey (South Africa) Jean Andersen	6–4, 6–3
Win	9–1	Jan 2012	China F1, Shenzhen	Futures	Hard	(Slovakia) Ivo Klec	(Chinese Taipei) Hsin-Han Lee (Chinese Taipei) Hsien-Yin Peng	6–4, 6–2
Win	5–1	Feb 2012	Quimper, France	Challenger	Hard	(France) Maxime Teixeira	(Germany) Dustin Brown (United Kingdom) Jonathan Marray	7–6^{(7–5)}, 6–4
Win	6–1	Apr 2012	Le Gosier, France	Challenger	Hard	(France) Albano Olivetti	(Australia) Paul Hanley (Australia) Jordan Kerr	7–5, 1–6, [10–7]
Loss	9–2	Jul 2012	France F12, Montauban	Futures	Clay	(France) Hugo Nys	(France) Jonathan Eysseric (France) Nicolas Renavand	7–6^{(7–3)}, 4–6, [9–11]
Win	10–2	Oct 2012	Israel F10, Akko	Futures	Hard	(Finland) Henrik Sillanpää	(Netherlands) Stephan Fransen (Netherlands) Wesley Koolhof	6–4, 6–3
Loss	10–3	Oct 2012	Israel F11, Ashkelon	Futures	Hard	(France) Davy Sum	(Netherlands) Stephan Fransen (Netherlands) Wesley Koolhof	4–6, 4–6
Win	11–3	Jan 2013	France F2, Bressuire	Futures	Hard	(France) Nicolas Renavand	(Montenegro) Goran Tošić (Republic of Ireland) James Cluskey	6–2, 7–6^{(9–7)}
Win	7–1	Apr 2013	Itajaí, Brazil	Challenger	Clay	(Australia) James Duckworth	(Brazil) Fabrício Neis (Brazil) Guilherme Clezar	7–5, 6–2
Loss	7–2	Apr 2013	São Paulo, Brazil	Challenger	Clay	(United States) James Cerretani	(Brazil) Marcelo Demoliner (Brazil) João Souza	4–6, 6–3, [6–10]
Win	12–3	Jun 2013	Germany F7, Römerberg	Futures	Clay	(France) Albano Olivetti	(Czech Republic) Marek Michalička (Czech Republic) David Pultr	6–7^{(3–7)}, 6–4, [10–5]
Win	13–3	Jul 2013	France F11, Montauban	Futures	Clay	(Monaco) Benjamin Balleret	(France) Julien Obry (France) Adrien Puget	6–4, 7–6^{(10–8)}
Win	8–2	Jul 2013	San Benedetto, Italy	Challenger	Clay	(France) Maxime Teixeira	(Italy) Alessandro Giannessi (Portugal) João Sousa	6–4, 6–3
Win	9–2	Sep 2013	St. Remy, France	Challenger	Hard	(France) Albano Olivetti	(France) Marc Gicquel (France) Josselin Ouanna	6–3, 6–7^{(5–7)}, [15–13]
Win	10–2	Feb 2014	Quimper, France	Challenger	Hard	(France) Albano Olivetti	(Croatia) Toni Androić (Croatia) Nikola Mektić	6–4, 6–3
Loss	10–3	Mar 2014	Cherbourg, France	Challenger	Hard	(France) Albano Olivetti	(Finland) Henri Kontinen (Russia) Konstantin Kravchuk	4–6, 7–6^{(7–3)}, [7–10]
Loss	10–4	Apr 2014	Vercelli, Italy	Challenger	Clay	(France) Albano Olivetti	(Italy) Matteo Donati (Italy) Stefano Napolitano	6–7^{(2–7)}, 3–6
Win	11–4	May 2014	Tunis, Tunisia	Challenger	Clay	(Canada) Adil Shamasdin	(Netherlands) Stephan Fransen (Netherlands) Jesse Huta Galung	6–3, 7–6^{(7–5)}
Win	12–4	Sep 2014	St. Remy, France	Challenger	Hard	(Russia) Konstantin Kravchuk	(France) David Guez (France) Martin Vaïsse	6–1, 7–6^{(7–3)}
Win	13–4	Nov 2014	Mouilleron-le-Captif, France	Challenger	Hard	(France) Nicolas Mahut	(Germany) Tobias Kamke (Germany) Philipp Marx	6–3, 6–4
Win	14–4	Feb 2016	Wrocław, Poland	Challenger	Hard	(France) Albano Olivetti	(Croatia) Nikola Mektić (Croatia) Antonio Šančić	6–3, 7–6^{(7–4)}
Win	15–4	Aug 2020	Prague, Czech Republic	Challenger	Clay	(France) Arthur Rinderknech	(Czech Republic) Zdeněk Kolář (Czech Republic) Lukáš Rosol	6–3, 6–4
Win	16–4	Oct 2021	Orleans, France	Challenger	Hard	(France) Albano Olivetti	(France) Antoine Hoang (France) Kyrian Jacquet	6–2, 2–6, [11–9]
Win	17–4	Mar 2022	Biel/Bienne, Switzerland	Challenger	Hard (i)	(France) Albano Olivetti	(India) Purav Raja (India) Ramkumar Ramanathan	6–3, 6–4
Loss	17–5	Jan 2023	Oeiras, Portugal	Challenger	Hard (i)	(France) Jonathan Eysseric	(Romania) Victor Vlad Cornea (Czech Republic) Petr Nouza	3–6, 6–7^{(3–7)}
Win	18–5	Jul 2023	Braunschweig, Germany	Challenger	Clay	(France) Arthur Reymond	(India) Rithvik Choudary Bollipalli (India) Arjun Kadhe	7–6^{(9–7)}, 6–4
Win	19–5	Jul 2023	Segovia, Spain	Challenger	Hard	(France) Dan Added	(Philippines) Francis Alcantara (China) Sun Fajing	4–6, 6–3, [12–10]
Loss	19–6	Jan 2025	Canberra, Australia	Challenger	Hard	(Switzerland) Jérôme Kym	(United States) Ryan Seggerman (United States) Eliot Spizzirri	1–6, 7–5, [10–5]

== Performance timelines ==
Key
W	F	SF	QF	#R	RR	Q#	P#	DNQ	A	Z#	PO	G	S	B	NMS	NTI	P	NH

(W) winner; (F) finalist; (SF) semifinalist; (QF) quarterfinalist; (#R) rounds 4, 3, 2, 1; (RR) round-robin stage; (Q#) qualification round; (P#) preliminary round; (DNQ) did not qualify; (A) absent; (Z#) Davis/Fed Cup Zonal Group (with number indication) or (PO) play-off; (G) gold, (S) silver or (B) bronze Olympic/Paralympic medal; (NMS) not a Masters tournament; (NTI) not a Tier I tournament; (P) postponed; (NH) not held; (SR) strike rate (events won / competed); (W–L) win–loss record.
To avoid confusion and double counting, these charts are updated at the conclusion of a tournament or when the player's participation has ended.

=== Singles ===
Tournament	2010	2011	2012	2013	2014	2015	2016	2017	2018	2019	2020	2021	2022	2023	2024	2025	SR	W–L	Win %
Grand Slam tournaments
Australian Open	A	A	A	Q2	Q3	Q1	3R	1R	1R	3R	2R	1R	A	A	Q2	Q1	0 / 6	5–6	45%
French Open	A	Q1	Q2	Q2	1R	Q2	1R	2R	3R	2R	2R	1R	Q1	Q1	1R	2R	0 / 9	6–9	40%
Wimbledon	A	A	A	Q1	1R	2R	3R	2R	2R	1R	NH	1R	A	Q2	Q2	Q1	0 / 7	5–7	42%
US Open	A	A	Q2	Q2	Q1	1R	1R	1R	2R	1R	A	1R	A	Q1	Q2	Q1	0 / 6	1–6	14%
Win–loss	0–0	0–0	0–0	0–0	0–2	1–2	4–4	2–4	4–4	3–4	2–2	0–4	0–0	0–0	0–1	1–1	0 / 28	17–28	38%
ATP Tour Masters 1000
Indian Wells	A	A	A	A	A	A	1R	2R	4R	1R	NH	A	A	A	A	A	0 / 4	4–4	50%
Miami	A	A	A	A	Q1	A	2R	Q1	2R	1R	NH	2R	A	A	A	A	0 / 4	3–4	43%
Monte-Carlo	A	A	A	A	A	A	2R	1R	2R	3R	NH	Q1	A	A	A	Q1	0 / 4	4–4	50%
Madrid	A	A	A	A	A	A	1R	2R	Q2	1R	NH	1R	A	A	Q1	A	0 / 4	1–4	20%
Rome	A	A	A	A	Q1	A	A	Q1	A	A	A	A	A	A	A	Q1	0 / 0	0–0	–
Montreal / Toronto	A	A	A	A	A	Q2	A	1R	2R	1R	NH	A	A	A	A	1R	0 / 4	1–4	20%
Cincinnati	A	A	A	A	A	A	A	A	A	1R	A	A	A	A	A	A	0 / 1	0–1	0%
Shanghai	A	A	A	A	A	Q2	A	A	A	A	NH			A	A	A	0 / 0	0–0	–
Paris	A	A	A	2R	1R	1R	1R	1R	1R	A	2R	1R	A	A	A	Q1	0 / 8	2–8	20%
Win–loss	0–0	0–0	0–0	1–1	0–1	0–1	2–5	2–5	6–5	2–6	1–1	1–3	0–0	0–0	0–0	0–1	0 / 29	15–29	34%
Career statistics
	2010	2011	2012	2013	2014	2015	2016	2017	2018	2019	2020	2021	2022	2023	2024	2025	Career		
Tournaments	0	0	0	2	11	6	12	19	21	24	10	14	3	1	3	7	133		
Titles	0	0	0	0	0	0	0	0	0	0	0	0	0	0	0	0	0		
Finals	0	0	0	0	0	1	0	0	1	1	0	1	0	0	0	0	4		
Overall win–loss	0–0	0–0	0–0	1–2	5–11	7–6	7–12	10–20	24–21	22–24	10–10	9–14	2–3	3–1	1–3	4–7	0 / 133	105–134	44%
Win %	–	–	–	33%	31%	54%	37%	33%	53%	48%	50%	39%	40%	75%	25%	36%	43.93%		
Year-end ranking	498	361	257	151	111	167	78	81	55	65	83	110	305	237	148	155	$10,074,807		

=== Doubles ===
Tournament	2010	2011	2012	2013	2014	2015	2016	2017	2018	2019	2020	2021	2022	2023	2024	2025	2026	SR	W–L	Win %
Grand Slam tournaments
Australian Open	Absent					F	2R	QF	2R	W	1R	QF	Absent				1R	1 / 8	19–7	73%
French Open	A	1R	1R	1R	1R	3R	3R	1R	W	A	3R	W	1R	1R	A	1R		2 / 13	18–11	62%
Wimbledon	Absent				Q1	3R	W	2R	2R	2R	NH	2R	A	1R	A	3R		1 / 8	14–6	70%
US Open	Absent					W	SF	1R	3R	1R	A	QF	A	SF	A	A		1 / 7	19–6	76%
Win–loss	0–0	0–1	0–1	0–1	0–1	15–3	13–3	4–4	10–3	7–2	2–2	13–3	0–1	4–3	0–0	2–1	0–1	5 / 36	70–30	70%
ATP Tour Finals
ATP Finals	Did not qualify					RR	RR	RR	F	W	DNQ	W	Did not qualify					2 / 6	14–9	61%
Olympics
Summer Olympics	Not Held		A	Not Held			1R	Not Held				1R	Not Held		A	Not Held		0 / 2	0–2	0%
ATP Tour Masters 1000
Indian Wells	Absent						W	2R	2R	2R	NH	Absent						1 / 4	8–3	73%
Miami	Absent						W	2R	A	A	NH	2R	Absent					1 / 3	7–1	88%
Monte-Carlo	Absent						W	SF	2R	1R	NH	QF	2R	Absent			2R	1 / 7	8–6	57%
Madrid	Absent						SF	A	SF	A	NH	QF	2R	Absent				0 / 4	6–4	60%
Rome	Absent							W	Absent									1 / 1	4–0	100%
Montreal / Toronto	Absent					2R	A	W	2R	A	NH	Absent						1 / 3	4–2	80%
Cincinnati	Absent					2R	QF	W	A	2R	Absent							1 / 4	7–3	70%
Shanghai	Absent					QF	Absent				NH			Absent				0 / 1	1–0	100%
Paris	Absent			1R	1R	2R	F	QF	QF	W	QF	F	Absent			SF		1 / 10	16–9	64%
Win–loss	0–0	0–0	0–0	0–1	0–1	2–3	19–3	17–3	4–5	6–3	1–1	8–4	0–2	0–0	0–0	3–1	1–1	7 / 37	61–28	69%
Career statistics
	2010	2011	2012	2013	2014	2015	2016	2017	2018	2019	2020	2021	2022	2023	2024	2025	2026	SR	W–L	Win %
Titles / Finals	0 / 0	0 / 0	0 / 0	0 / 0	1 / 1	2 / 5	5 / 7	3 / 3	2 / 4	4 / 4	2 / 2	3 / 5	1 / 1	0 / 0	0 / 1	2 / 2	0 / 1	25 / 36		
Overall win–loss	0–1	1–2	0–3	0–3	5–5	30–12	41–13	29–12	28–12	27–8	10–5	36–15	6–5	5–4	5–3	17–6	7–5	247–114		
Win %	0%	33%	0%	0%	50%	71%	76%	71%	70%	77%	67%	71%	55%	56%	63%	74%	58%	68.42%		
Year-End Ranking	290	135	139	151	63	14	2	13	12	5	23	8	193	77	346	61				

== Junior Grand Slam finals ==
=== Doubles: 1 (title) ===
Result	Year	Tournament	Surface	Partner	Opponents	Score
Win	2009	Wimbledon	Grass	(Germany) Kevin Krawietz	(France) Adrien Puget (France) Julien Obry	6–7^{(3–7)}, 6–2, [12–10]

== Wins over top 10 players ==
=== Singles ===
- Herbert has a 4–18 record against players who were, at the time the match was played, ranked in the top 10.

Season	2010	2011	2012	2013	2014	2015	2016	2017	2018	2019	2020	2021	Total
Wins	0	0	0	0	0	0	0	1	0	2	0	1	4

#	Player	Rank	Event	Surface	Rd	Score	Rk
2017
1.	(Austria) Dominic Thiem	8	Rotterdam Open, Netherlands	Hard	QF	6–4, 7–6^{(7–3)}	109
2019
2.	(Austria) Dominic Thiem	8	Qatar Open, Qatar	Hard	1R	6–3, 7–5	55
3.	(Japan) Kei Nishikori	6	Monte-Carlo Masters, Monaco	Clay	2R	7–5, 6–4	49
2021
4.	(Greece) Stefanos Tsitsipas	5	Marseille, France	Hard	QF	6–7^{(6–8)}, 6–4, 6–2	93

=== Doubles ===
- He has a 35–26 record against players who were, at the time the match was played, ranked in the top 10.

Type	2014	2015	2016	2017	2018	2019	2020	2021	2022	2023	2024	2025	2026	Total
Wins	2	4	5	8	7	4	0	5	0	0	1	0	1	37

#	Opponents	Rank	Event	Surface	Rd	Score	Partner	Rk
2014
1.	(United States) Bob Bryan (United States) Mike Bryan	1; 1	Tokyo, Japan	Hard	1R	4–6, 6–3, [10–4]	(Poland) Michał Przysiężny	139
2.	(Croatia) Ivan Dodig (Brazil) Marcelo Melo	8; 5	Tokyo, Japan	Hard	F	6–3, 6–7^{(3–7)}, [10–5]	(Poland) Michał Przysiężny	139
2015
3.	(Pakistan) Aisam-ul-Haq Qureshi (Serbia) Nenad Zimonjić	37; 3	Australian Open, Australia	Hard	3R	6–3, 6–3	(France) Nicolas Mahut	64
4.	(France) Julien Benneteau (France) Édouard Roger-Vasselin	5; 6	Australian Open, Australia	Hard	QF	7–6^{(7–5)}, 3–6, 6–3	(France) Nicolas Mahut	64
5.	(Croatia) Ivan Dodig (Brazil) Marcelo Melo	12; 7	Australian Open, Australia	Hard	SF	6–4, 6–7^{(5–7)}, 7–6^{(7–5)}	(France) Nicolas Mahut	64
6.	(Netherlands) Jean-Julien Rojer (Romania) Horia Tecău	6; 5	US Open, New York, United States	Hard	QF	7–6^{(7–5)}, 6–4	(France) Nicolas Mahut	21
2016
7.	(United States) Bob Bryan (United States) Mike Bryan	5; 6	Miami, United States	Hard	SF	6–3, 6–3	(France) Nicolas Mahut	12
8.	(United Kingdom) Jamie Murray (Brazil) Bruno Soares	1; 12	Monte Carlo, Monaco	Clay	F	4–6, 6–0, [10–6]	(France) Nicolas Mahut	8
9.	(United States) Bob Bryan (United States) Mike Bryan	7; 8	Madrid, Spain	Clay	QF	3–6, 7–6^{(7–4)}, [10–8]	(France) Nicolas Mahut	4
10.	(Argentina) Juan Martín del Potro (Brazil) Marcelo Melo	588; 8	London, United Kingdom	Grass	QF	6–4, 6–4	(France) Nicolas Mahut	3
11.	(Finland) Henri Kontinen (Australia) John Peers	35; 10	Wimbledon, London, United Kingdom	Grass	QF	6–4, 6–7^{(7–4)}, 6–4, 7–6^{(10–8)}	(France) Nicolas Mahut	3
2017
12.	(Croatia) Ivan Dodig (Spain) Marcel Granollers	10; 17	Monte Carlo, Monaco	Clay	QF	3–6, 6–4, [10–6]	(France) Nicolas Mahut	9
13.	(Croatia) Ivan Dodig (Spain) Marcel Granollers	10; 17	Barcelona, Spain	Clay	1R	3–6, 7–6^{(7–2)}, [10–7]	(Belgium) David Goffin	9
14.	(United States) Bob Bryan (United States) Mike Bryan	7; 7	Rome, Italy	Clay	SF	7–6^{(7–5)}, 4–6, [10–7]	(France) Nicolas Mahut	10
15.	(United States) Bob Bryan (United States) Mike Bryan	7; 7	Montreal, Canada	Hard	QF	7–6^{(7–5)}, 7–6^{(13–11)}	(France) Nicolas Mahut	13
16.	(India) Rohan Bopanna (Croatia) Ivan Dodig	21; 10	Montreal, Canada	Hard	F	6–4, 3–6, [10–6]	(France) Nicolas Mahut	13
17.	(United States) Bob Bryan (United States) Mike Bryan	8; 8	Cincinnati, United States	Hard	QF	4–6, 7–5, [10–8]	(France) Nicolas Mahut	11
18.	(United Kingdom) Jamie Murray (Brazil) Bruno Soares	6; 7	Cincinnati, United States	Hard	F	7–6^{(8–6)}, 6–4	(France) Nicolas Mahut	11
19.	(Netherlands) Jean-Julien Rojer (Romania) Horia Tecău	7; 8	ATP Finals, London, United Kingdom	Hard (i)	RR	1–6, 7–6^{(9–7)}, [10–8]	(France) Nicolas Mahut	13
2018
20.	(Croatia) Ivan Dodig (United States) Rajeev Ram	8; 22	Rotterdam, Netherlands	Hard (i)	SF	7–6^{(7–5)}, 4–6, [10–6]	(France) Nicolas Mahut	13
21.	(Austria) Oliver Marach (Croatia) Mate Pavić	6; 5	Rotterdam, Netherlands	Hard (i)	F	2–6, 6–2, [10–7]	(France) Nicolas Mahut	13
22.	(Austria) Oliver Marach (Croatia) Mate Pavić	2; 1	French Open, Paris, France	Clay	F	6–2, 7–6^{(7–4)}	(France) Nicolas Mahut	19
23.	(Poland) Łukasz Kubot (Brazil) Marcelo Melo	7; 7	ATP Finals, London, United Kingdom	Hard (i)	RR	6–2, 6–4	(France) Nicolas Mahut	17
24.	(United States) Mike Bryan (United States) Jack Sock	1; 4	ATP Finals, London, United Kingdom	Hard (i)	RR	6–2, 6–2	(France) Nicolas Mahut	17
25.	(Colombia) Juan Sebastián Cabal (Colombia) Robert Farah	5; 5	ATP Finals, London, United Kingdom	Hard (i)	SF	6–3, 5–7, [10–5]	(France) Nicolas Mahut	17
26.	(Croatia) Ivan Dodig (Croatia) Mate Pavić	35; 4	Davis Cup, Lille, France	Clay (i)	RR	6–4, 6–4, 3–6, 7–6^{(7–3)}	(France) Nicolas Mahut	12
2019
27.	(United States) Bob Bryan (United States) Mike Bryan	13; 1	Australian Open, Australia	Hard	QF	6–4, 7–6^{(7–3)}	(France) Nicolas Mahut	12
28.	(Colombia) Juan Sebastián Cabal (Colombia) Robert Farah	1; 1	ATP Finals, London, United Kingdom	Hard (i)	RR	6–3, 7–5	(France) Nicolas Mahut	14
29.	(Germany) Kevin Krawietz (Germany) Andreas Mies	7; 8	ATP Finals, London, United Kingdom	Hard (i)	RR	7–5, 7–6^{(7–3)}	(France) Nicolas Mahut	14
30.	(Poland) Łukasz Kubot (Brazil) Marcelo Melo	5; 6	ATP Finals, London, United Kingdom	Hard (i)	SF	6–3, 7–6^{(7–4)}	(France) Nicolas Mahut	14
2021
31.	(Colombia) Juan Sebastián Cabal (Colombia) Robert Farah	4; 3	French Open, Paris, France	Clay	SF	6–7^{(2–7)}, 7–6^{(7–2)}, 6–4	(France) Nicolas Mahut	20
32.	(Slovakia) Filip Polášek (Australia) John Peers	9; 14	Paris, France	Hard (i)	SF	2–6, 6–3, [11–9]	(France) Nicolas Mahut	8
33.	(Colombia) Juan Sebastián Cabal (Colombia) Robert Farah	10; 10	ATP Finals, Turin, Italy	Hard (i)	RR	7–6^{(7–1)}, 6–4	(France) Nicolas Mahut	9
34.	(Spain) Marcel Granollers (Argentina) Horacio Zeballos	6; 5	ATP Finals, Turin, Italy	Hard (i)	SF	6–3, 6–4	(France) Nicolas Mahut	9
35.	(United States) Rajeev Ram (United Kingdom) Joe Salisbury	4; 3	ATP Finals, Turin, Italy	Hard (i)	F	6–4, 7–6^{(7–0)}	(France) Nicolas Mahut	9
2024
36.	(Spain) Marcel Granollers (Spain) Pablo Carreño Busta	1 NR	Davis Cup, Valencia, Spain	Hard	RR	7–6^{(9–7)}, 6–7^{(10–12)}, [10–8]	(France) Édouard Roger-Vasselin	806
2026
37.	(El Salvador) Marcelo Arévalo (Croatia) Mate Pavić	9; 9	Barcelona, Spain	Clay	1R	6–4, 6–2	(Italy) Andrea Vavassori	64
