= 2009 Grand Prix de Tennis de Lyon – Singles =

Singles
- 2009 Grand Prix de Tennis de Lyon

Final
- Champion: (Croatia) Ivan Ljubičić
- Runner-up: (France) Michaël Llodra
- Score: 7–5, 6–3

Details
- Draw: 32
- Seeds: 8

Events
Singles	Doubles
- Grand Prix de Tennis de Lyon

Robin Söderling was the defending champion, but he decided not to compete this year.

Ivan Ljubičić defeated Michaël Llodra 7–5, 6–3 in the final.

== Seeds ==
1. (France) Jo-Wilfried Tsonga (quarterfinals)
2. (France) Gilles Simon (semifinals)
3. (Croatia) Ivan Ljubičić (champion)
4. (Argentina) Juan Mónaco (second round)
5. (France) Julien Benneteau (quarterfinals)
6. (France) Paul-Henri Mathieu (second round)
7. (Germany) Benjamin Becker (second round)
8. (Spain) Albert Montañés (second round)

== Draw ==
Key

- Q = Qualifier
- WC = Wild card
- LL = Lucky loser
- Alt = Alternate
- ITF = ITF entry
- PR = Protected ranking
- SR = Special ranking
- SE = Special exempt
- JE = Junior exempt
- JR = Junior Accelerator Programme entrant
- CO = College Accelerator Programme entrant
- NG = Next Gen Accelerator Program entrant
- w/o = Walkover
- r = Retired
- d = Defaulted

=== Finals ===
Semifinals
WC	(France) Arnaud Clément	2	4
3	(Croatia) Ivan Ljubičić	6	6
WC	(France) Michaël Llodra	6^{4}	6	7^{7}
2	(France) Gilles Simon	7^{7}	3	6^{1}

Final
3	(Croatia) Ivan Ljubičić	7	6
WC	(France) Michaël Llodra	5	3

=== Top half ===
First round
1	(France) J-W Tsonga	7^{7}	7^{7}
(United States) K Kim	6^{5}	6^{5}
(Belgium) O Rochus	6	6
Q	(France) V Millot	3	2
(Spain) Ó Hernández	1	3
WC	(France) A Clément	6	6
(Italy) P Lorenzi	2	2
7	(Germany) B Becker	6	6
3	(Croatia) I Ljubičić	6	6
(Argentina) M Vassallo Argüello	3	4
(Germany) N Kiefer	4	7^{9}	7^{7}
WC	(France) S Grosjean	6	6^{7}	6^{2}
(Belgium) C Rochus	3	3
(France) F Serra	6	6
(France) F Santoro	4	4
8	(Spain) A Montañés	6	6

Second round
1	(France) J-W Tsonga	6	6
(Belgium) O Rochus	3	2
WC	(France) A Clément	6	6
7	(Germany) B Becker	4	3
3	(Croatia) I Ljubičić	6	3	6
(Germany) N Kiefer	3	6	3
(France) F Serra	7	6
8	(Spain) A Montañés	5	3

Quarterfinals
1	(France) J-W Tsonga	7	4	6^{8}
WC	(France) A Clément	5	6	7^{10}
3	(Croatia) I Ljubičić	7^{8}	6
(France) F Serra	6^{6}	2

Semifinals
WC	(France) A Clément	2	4
3	(Croatia) I Ljubičić	6	6

=== Bottom half ===
First round
6	(France) P-H Mathieu	7^{7}	6
(Argentina) L Mayer	6^{5}	2
Q	(France) J Haehnel	1	4
(France) M Gicquel	6	6
(Algeria) L Ouahab	1	2
WC	(France) M Llodra	6	6
(France) J Ouanna	3	2
4	(Argentina) J Mónaco	6	6
5	(France) J Benneteau	7^{7}	6
(Spain) A Martín	6^{1}	1
Q	(South Africa) K Anderson	6	4	7^{7}
(Germany) S Greul	4	6	6^{3}
Q	(France) D Guez	6	6
(United States) R Ram	2	4
(Italy) S Bolelli	6^{5}	6^{5}
2	(France) G Simon	7^{7}	7^{7}

Second round
6	(France) P-H Mathieu	4	0
(France) M Gicquel	6	6
WC	(France) M Llodra	6	6
4	(Argentina) J Mónaco	3	4
5	(France) J Benneteau	7	6
Q	(South Africa) K Anderson	5	2
Q	(France) D Guez	1	2
2	(France) G Simon	6	6

Quarterfinals
(France) M Gicquel	6^{6}	4
WC	(France) M Llodra	7^{8}	6
5	(France) J Benneteau	6^{5}	3
2	(France) G Simon	7^{7}	6

Semifinals
WC	(France) M Llodra	6^{4}	6	7^{7}
2	(France) G Simon	7^{7}	3	6^{1}

== Qualifying ==
=== Seeds ===
1. (South Africa) Kevin Anderson (qualified)
2. (France) Laurent Recouderc (qualifying competition)
3. (France) Sébastien de Chaunac (second round)
4. (France) Thierry Ascione (second round)
5. (Spain) Albert Ramos Viñolas (second round)
6. (France) David Guez (qualified)
7. (Ecuador) Giovanni Lapentti (first round)
8. (France) Vincent Millot (qualified)

=== Qualifiers ===
1. (South Africa) Kevin Anderson
2. (France) David Guez
3. (France) Jérôme Haehnel
4. (France) Vincent Millot

=== First qualifier ===
First round			Second round				Qualifying competition
			1	(South Africa) Kevin Anderson	6	6
(Brazil) Marcelo Melo	7^{7}	7^{7}		(Brazil) Marcelo Melo	2	4
(France) Ludovic Walter	6^{3}	6^{5}					1	(South Africa) Kevin Anderson	6	6
(Spain) Guillermo Alcaide	3	4						(France) Augustin Gensse	2	4
(France) Augustin Gensse	6	6		(France) Augustin Gensse	6	6
			5	(Spain) Albert Ramos Viñolas	3	3

=== Second qualifier ===
First round				Second round				Qualifying competition
				2	(France) Laurent Recouderc	6	6
(France) Florian Reynet		7	6		(France) Florian Reynet	1	2
(France) Nicolas Renavand		5	3					2	(France) Laurent Recouderc	6^{7}	2
	(France) Laurent Rochette	6	6					6	(France) David Guez	7^{9}	6
WC	(France) Michael Bois	2	3		(France) Laurent Rochette	3	4
				6	(France) David Guez	6	6

=== Third qualifier ===
First round
(France) Jérôme Haehnel	6	6
(Germany) Nils Langer	2	0
(France) Francois-Arthur Vibert	1	1
(France) Charles-Antoine Brezac	6	6
(Netherlands) Matwé Middelkoop	7^{8}	7
7	(Ecuador) Giovanni Lapentti	6^{6}	5

Second round
3	(France) Sébastien de Chaunac	3	3
(France) Jérôme Haehnel	6	6
(France) Charles-Antoine Brezac	6	6
(Netherlands) Matwé Middelkoop	4	4

Qualifying competition
(France) Jérôme Haehnel	6	6
(France) Charles-Antoine Brezac	2	3

=== Fourth qualifier ===
First round
(Switzerland) George Bastl	2	6	3
(Poland) Jerzy Janowicz	6	3
(Brazil) André Sá	6	6^{4}	4
(Serbia) Vladimir Obradović	4	7^{7}	6
(France) Jérôme Inzerillo	4	4
8	(France) Vincent Millot	6	6

Second round
4	(France) Thierry Ascione	6	6^{4}	4
(Poland) Jerzy Janowicz	4	7^{7}	6
(Serbia) Vladimir Obradović	6	3	0
8	(France) Vincent Millot	3	6	6

Qualifying competition
(Poland) Jerzy Janowicz	3	2
8	(France) Vincent Millot	6	6
