= 2009 Grand Prix de Tennis de Lyon =

- Date: 26 October – 1 November 2009
- Edition: 23rd
- Category: ATP World Tour 250 Series
- Draw: 32S / 16D
- Prize money: €575,250
- Surface: Hard / indoor
- Location: Lyon, France
- Venue: Palais des Sports de Gerland

Champions

Singles
- (Croatia) Ivan Ljubičić

Doubles
- (France) Julien Benneteau / (France) Nicolas Mahut
| ← 2008 · | Grand Prix de Tennis de Lyon | · 2010 → |

The 2009 Grand Prix de Tennis de Lyon was a men's tennis tournament played on indoor hard courts. It was the 23rd edition of the Grand Prix de Tennis de Lyon, and was part of the ATP World Tour 250 Series of the 2009 ATP World Tour. It was held at the Palais des Sports de Gerland in Lyon, France, from 26 October through 1 November 2009. Third-seeded Ivan Ljubičić won the singles title.

== Finals ==
=== Singles ===
(Croatia) Ivan Ljubičić defeated (France) Michaël Llodra 7–5, 6–3

- Ljubičić wins his first title of the year and ninth of his career. It was his second win at the event, also winning in 2001.

=== Doubles ===
(France) Julien Benneteau / (France) Nicolas Mahut defeated (France) Arnaud Clément / (France) Sébastien Grosjean 6–4, 7–6^{(8–6)}

== ATP entrants ==
=== Seeds ===
| Country | Player | Rank^{1} | Seed |
|---|---|---|---|
| FRA | Jo-Wilfried Tsonga | 8 | 1 |
| FRA | Gilles Simon | 12 | 2 |
| CRO | Ivan Ljubičić | 28 | 3 |
| ARG | Juan Mónaco | 29 | 4 |
| FRA | Julien Benneteau | 33 | 5 |
| FRA | Paul-Henri Mathieu | 35 | 6 |
| GER | Benjamin Becker | 38 | 7 |
| ESP | Albert Montañés | 40 | 8 |

- Seeds are based on the rankings of October 19, 2009

=== Other entrants ===
The following players received wildcards into the singles main draw:

- (France) Arnaud Clément
- (France) Sébastien Grosjean
- (France) Michaël Llodra

The following players received entry from the qualifying draw:

- (South Africa) Kevin Anderson
- (France) David Guez
- (France) Jérôme Haehnel
- (France) Vincent Millot
