= 2008 Grand Prix de Tennis de Lyon – Doubles =

Doubles
- 2008 Grand Prix de Tennis de Lyon

Final
- Champions: (France) Michaël Llodra; (Israel) Andy Ram
- Runners-up: (Australia) Stephen Huss; (United Kingdom) Ross Hutchins
- Score: 6–3, 5–7, [10–8]

Details
- Draw: 16
- Seeds: 4

Events
Singles	Doubles
← 2007 ·	Grand Prix de Tennis de Lyon	· 2009 →

Sébastien Grosjean and Jo-Wilfried Tsonga were the defending champions, but were forced to withdraw due to a shoulder injury for Grosjean, before their quarterfinals match against Michaël Llodra and Andy Ram.

Michaël Llodra and Andy Ram won in the final 6–3, 5–7, [10–8], against Stephen Huss and Ross Hutchins.

== Seeds ==
1. (Sweden) Jonas Björkman / (Zimbabwe) Kevin Ullyett (semifinals)
2. (France) Michaël Llodra / (Israel) Andy Ram (champions)
3. (South Africa) Jeff Coetzee / (South Africa) Wesley Moodie (quarterfinals)
4. (Brazil) Marcelo Melo / (Brazil) André Sá (first round)

== Draw ==
=== Key ===
- Q = Qualifier
- WC = Wild card
- LL = Lucky loser
- Alt = Alternate
- SE = Special exempt
- PR = Protected ranking
- ITF = ITF entry
- JE = Junior exempt
- w/o = Walkover
- r = Retired
- d = Defaulted
- SR = Special ranking

=== Draw ===
First round

Quarterfinals

Semifinals

Final

1
- (Sweden) J Björkman
- (Zimbabwe) K Ullyett
4
6
[10]

- (South Africa) C Haggard
- (United States) S Querrey
6
4
[6]

1
- (Sweden) J Björkman
- (Zimbabwe) K Ullyett
7^{7}
6

- (Argentina) L Arnold Ker
- (Brazil) B Soares
6
6

- (Argentina) L Arnold Ker
- (Brazil) B Soares
6^{1}
4

- (Spain) T Robredo
- (France) F Santoro
1
3

1
- (Sweden) J Björkman
- (Zimbabwe) K Ullyett
7^{11}
5
[5]

3
- (South Africa) J Coetzee
- (South Africa) W Moodie
6
6

- (Australia) S Huss
- (United Kingdom) R Hutchins
6^{9}
7
[10]

WC
- (France) A Clément
- (France) S de Chaunac
2
1

3
- (South Africa) J Coetzee
- (South Africa) W Moodie
6^{4}
6
[6]

- (Italy) F Fognini
- (Italy) A Seppi
3
6^{4}

- (Australia) S Huss
- (United Kingdom) R Hutchins
7^{7}
3
[10]

- (Australia) S Huss
- (United Kingdom) R Hutchins
6
7^{7}

- (Australia) S Huss
- (United Kingdom) R Hutchins
3
7
[8]

- (United States) R Ginepri
- (United States) A Roddick
2
4

2
- (France) M Llodra
- (Israel) A Ram
6
5
[10]

WC
- (France) T Ascione
- (France) M Gicquel
6
6

WC
- (France) T Ascione
- (France) M Gicquel
7^{9}
6

- (Sweden) R Lindstedt
- (United Kingdom) J Murray
6
7^{9}

- (Sweden) R Lindstedt
- (United Kingdom) J Murray
6^{7}
3

4
- (Brazil) M Melo
- (Brazil) A Sá
0
6^{7}

WC
- (France) T Ascione
- (France) M Gicquel
6^{4}
4

- (France) S Grosjean
- (France) J-W Tsonga
6
5
[10]

2
- (France) M Llodra
- (Israel) A Ram
7^{7}
6

- (United States) S Lipsky
- (United States) D Martin
4
7
[5]

- (France) S Grosjean
- (France) J-W Tsonga

- (Belgium) S Darcis
- (Belgium) C Rochus
3
4

2
- (France) M Llodra
- (Israel) A Ram
w/o

2
- (France) M Llodra
- (Israel) A Ram
6
6
