= 2009 Open d'Orléans – Singles =

Tennis tournament in France

Singles
- 2009 Open d'Orléans

Final
- Champion: (Belgium) Xavier Malisse
- Runner-up: (France) Stéphane Robert
- Score: 6–1, 6–2

Events
Singles	Doubles
← 2008 ·	Open d'Orléans	· 2010 →

Nicolas Mahut was the defending champion, but he lost to Stéphane Robert in the quarterfinal.
Xavier Malisse defeated Stéphane Robert 6–1, 6–2 in the final.

== Seeds ==
1. (France) Jérémy Chardy (quarterfinals)
2. (Portugal) Frederico Gil (quarterfinals)
3. (France) Josselin Ouanna (second round)
4. (Germany) Daniel Brands (quarterfinals)
5. (France) Michaël Llodra (semifinals)
6. (South Africa) Kevin Anderson (first round)
7. (Australia) Carsten Ball (first round)
8. (Belgium) Xavier Malisse (champion)

== Draw ==
=== Key ===
- Q = Qualifier
- WC = Wild card
- LL = Lucky loser
- Alt = Alternate
- ITF = ITF entry
- PR = Protected ranking
- SR = Special ranking
- SE = Special exempt
- JE = Junior exempt
- JR = Junior Accelerator Programme entrant
- CO = College Accelerator Programme entrant
- NG = Next Gen Accelerator Program entrant
- w/o = Walkover
- r = Retired
- d = Defaulted

=== Finals ===
Semifinals
(France) Stéphane Robert	6	7
(Switzerland) Stéphane Bohli	3	5
8	(Belgium) Xavier Malisse	3	7	6
5	(France) Michaël Llodra	6	5	0

Final
(France) Stéphane Robert	1	2
8	(Belgium) Xavier Malisse	6	6

=== Top half ===
First round
1	(France) J Chardy	4	7	6
Q	(Netherlands) M Middelkoop	6	6^{1}	4
(France) T Ascione	6	6
PR	(France) S Grosjean	4	4
LL	(France) V Millot	3	3
(France) S de Chaunac	6	6
(France) S Robert	7	7
6	(South Africa) K Anderson	6^{4}	6^{3}
3	(France) J Ouanna	3	6	7
(Germany) J Reister	6	1	6^{6}
(France) D Guez	3	2
(Switzerland) S Bohli	6	6
(Czech Republic) L Rosol	6	6
(United States) R Sweeting	4	2
WC	(France) N Mahut	3	6	7
7	(Australia) C Ball	6	3	5

Second round
1	(France) J Chardy	6	6
(France) T Ascione	4	4
(France) S de Chaunac	2	6^{3}
(France) S Robert	6	7
3	(France) J Ouanna	6^{2}	6	1
(Switzerland) S Bohli	7	3	6
(Czech Republic) L Rosol	6^{2}	2
WC	(France) N Mahut	7	6

Quarterfinals
1	(France) J Chardy	3	6	4
(France) S Robert	6	2	6
(Switzerland) S Bohli	6	6
WC	(France) N Mahut	4	3

Semifinals
(France) S Robert	6	7
(Switzerland) S Bohli	3	5

=== Bottom half ===
First round
8	(Belgium) X Malisse	1	6	6
(France) A Sidorenko	6	3	1
(Austria) A Haider-Maurer	5	4
(Slovakia) D Hrbatý	7	6
Q	(Italy) S Galvani	6	3	6^{4}
(France) É Roger-Vasselin	4	6	7
Q	(Morocco) R Chaki	2	2
4	(Germany) D Brands	6	6
5	(France) M Llodra	6	7
Q	(France) J Haehnel	4	6^{2}
SE	(Germany) D Kindlmann	6	6
(Italy) F Cipolla	4	0
WC	(France) O Patience	5	2
(Belgium) R Bemelmans	7	6
SE	(United Kingdom) A Bogdanovic	6^{9}	4
2	(Portugal) F Gil	7	6

Second round
8	(Belgium) X Malisse	3	6	7
(Slovakia) D Hrbatý	6	3	6^{6}
(France) É Roger-Vasselin	6^{3}	7	6^{3}
4	(Germany) D Brands	7	6^{3}	7
5	(France) M Llodra	5	6	6
(Germany) D Kindlmann	7	3	3
(Belgium) R Bemelmans	6	6^{4}	3
2	(Portugal) F Gil	3	7	6

Quarterfinals
8	(Belgium) X Malisse	4	6	6
4	(Germany) D Brands	6	2	3
5	(France) M Llodra	6	1	6
2	(Portugal) F Gil	3	6	3

Semifinals
8	(Belgium) X Malisse	3	7	6
5	(France) M Llodra	6	5	0
