= 2007 Grand Prix de Tennis de Lyon – Doubles =

Doubles
- 2007 Grand Prix de Tennis de Lyon

Final
- Champions: (France) Sébastien Grosjean (France) Jo-Wilfried Tsonga
- Runners-up: (Poland) Łukasz Kubot (Croatia) Lovro Zovko
- Score: 6–4, 6–3

Details
- Draw: 16
- Seeds: 4

Events
| Singles | Doubles |
| ← 2006 · | Grand Prix de Tennis de Lyon | · 2008 → |

Julien Benneteau and Arnaud Clément were the defending champions. They were both present but did not compete together.
Benneteau partnered with Michaël Llodra, but retired in the first round against Sébastien Grosjean and Jo-Wilfried Tsonga.
Clément partnered with Nicolas Mahut, but lost in the semifinals to Sébastien Grosjean and Jo-Wilfried Tsonga.

Sébastien Grosjean and Jo-Wilfried Tsonga won in the final 6–4, 6–3, against Łukasz Kubot and Lovro Zovko.

== Seeds ==
1. (France) Julien Benneteau / (France) Michaël Llodra (first round, retired)
2. (Israel) Jonathan Erlich / (Israel) Andy Ram (semifinals)
3. (France) Arnaud Clément / (France) Nicolas Mahut (semifinals)
4. (South Africa) Jeff Coetzee / (Netherlands) Rogier Wassen (first round)

== Draw ==
=== Key ===
- Q = Qualifier
- WC = Wild card
- LL = Lucky loser
- Alt = Alternate
- SE = Special exempt
- PR = Protected ranking
- ITF = ITF entry
- JE = Junior exempt
- w/o = Walkover
- r = Retired
- d = Defaulted
- SR = Special ranking

=== Draw ===
First round
1 | (France) J Benneteau (France) M Llodra | 6 | 4 | r
WC | (France) S Grosjean (France) J-W Tsonga | 2 | 6
(France) F Santoro (France) G Simon | 7^{7} | 6^{3} | [10]
(Argentina) D Hartfield (Argentina) J Mónaco | 6^{5} | 7^{7} | [3]
3 | (France) A Clément (France) N Mahut | 6 | 7
(Austria) O Marach (Slovakia) M Mertiňák | 2 | 5
WC | (France) T Ascione (France) M Gicquel | 7^{7} | 0 | [10]
(South Africa) C Haggard (United States) S Lipsky | 6^{4} | 6 | [7]
(Australia) J Kerr (United Kingdom) J Murray | 6^{5} | 6 | [10]
(Argentina) M García (Argentina) S Prieto | 7^{7} | 2 | [8]
(Poland) L Kubot (Croatia) L Zovko | 6 | 6
4 | (South Africa) J Coetzee (Netherlands) R Wassen | 1 | 4
(Australia) S Huss (Serbia) J Tipsarević | 5 | 4
(United States) M Fish (Czech Republic) J Levinský | 7 | 6
(United States) E Butorac (Brazil) A Sá | 5 | 5
2 | (Israel) J Erlich (Israel) A Ram | 7 | 7

Quarterfinals
WC | (France) S Grosjean (France) J-W Tsonga | w/o
(France) F Santoro (France) G Simon
3 | (France) A Clément (France) N Mahut | 6 | 5 | [10]
WC | (France) T Ascione (France) M Gicquel | 1 | 7 | [1]
(Australia) J Kerr (United Kingdom) J Murray | 6^{5} | 6^{3}
(Poland) L Kubot (Croatia) L Zovko | 7^{7} | 7^{7}
(United States) M Fish (Czech Republic) J Levinský | 3 | 4
2 | (Israel) J Erlich (Israel) A Ram | 6 | 6

Semifinals
WC | (France) S Grosjean (France) J-W Tsonga | 6 | 6^{4} | [10]
3 | (France) A Clément (France) N Mahut | 2 | 7^{7} | [4]
(Poland) L Kubot (Croatia) L Zovko | 7^{7} | 4 | [10]
2 | (Israel) J Erlich (Israel) A Ram | 6^{4} | 6 | [5]

Final
WC | (France) S Grosjean (France) J-W Tsonga | 6 | 6
(Poland) L Kubot (Croatia) L Zovko | 4 | 3
