= 2010 Open d'Orléans =

Tennis tournament in France

- Date: 18–24 October
- Edition: 6th
- Surface: Hard
- Location: Orléans, France

Champions

Singles
- (France) Nicolas Mahut

Doubles
- (France) Pierre-Hugues Herbert / (France) Nicolas Renavand
← 2009 ·	Open d'Orléans	· 2011 →

The 2010 Open d'Orléans was a professional tennis tournament played on hard courts. It was the sixth edition of the tournament which was part of the 2010 ATP Challenger Tour. It took place in Orléans, France between 18 and 24 October 2010.

== ATP entrants ==
=== Seeds ===
Country	Player	Rank^{1}	Seed
FRA	Michaël Llodra	28	1
BEL	Xavier Malisse	51	2
SVK	Lukáš Lacko	73	3
FRA	Stéphane Robert	93	4
GER	Björn Phau	99	5
FRA	Adrian Mannarino	108	6
JAM	Dustin Brown	109	7
BEL	Steve Darcis	110	8

- Rankings are as of October 11, 2010.

=== Other entrants ===
The following players received wildcards into the singles main draw:

- (France) Michaël Llodra
- (Belgium) Xavier Malisse
- (France) Vincent Millot
- (France) Alexandre Sidorenko

The following players received a special entrant into the singles main draw:

- (France) Marc Gicquel

The following players received entry from the qualifying draw:

- (France) Pierre-Hugues Herbert
- (France) Romain Jouan
- (Austria) Philipp Oswald (LL)
- (France) Nicolas Renavand
- (France) Mathieu Rodrigues

== Champions ==
=== Singles ===
(France) Nicolas Mahut def. (Bulgaria) Grigor Dimitrov, 2–6, 7–6(6), 7–6(4)

=== Doubles ===
(France) Pierre-Hugues Herbert / (France) Nicolas Renavand def. (France) Sébastien Grosjean / (France) Nicolas Mahut, 7–6(3), 1–6, [10–6]
