= 2009 Open d'Orléans =

Tennis tournament in France

- Date: 19–25 October
- Edition: 5th
- Surface: Hard
- Location: Orléans, France

Champions

Singles
- (Belgium) Xavier Malisse

Doubles
- (United Kingdom) Colin Fleming / (United Kingdom) Ken Skupski
← 2008 ·	Open d'Orléans	· 2010 →

The 2009 Open d'Orléans was a professional tennis tournament played on indoor hard courts. It was part of the 2009 ATP Challenger Tour. It took place in Orléans, France between 19 and 25 October 2009.

== ATP entrants ==
=== Seeds ===
Country	Player	Rank^{1}	Seed
FRA	Jérémy Chardy	34	1
POR	Frederico Gil	77	2
FRA	Josselin Ouanna	110	3
GER	Daniel Brands	119	4
FRA	Michaël Llodra	129	5
RSA	Kevin Anderson	130	6
AUS	Carsten Ball	134	7
BEL	Xavier Malisse	139	8

- Rankings are as of October 12, 2009.

=== Other entrants ===
The following players received wildcards into the singles main draw:

- (France) Jérémy Chardy
- (France) Nicolas Mahut
- (France) Olivier Patience

The following players received a Special Exempt into the singles main draw:

- (United Kingdom) Alex Bogdanovic
- (Germany) Dieter Kindlmann

The following players received entry from the qualifying draw:

- (Morocco) Rabie Chaki
- (Italy) Stefano Galvani
- (France) Jérôme Haehnel
- (Netherlands) Matwé Middelkoop
- (France) Vincent Millot (as a Lucky loser)

== Champions ==
=== Singles ===
(Belgium) Xavier Malisse def. (France) Stéphane Robert, 6–1, 6–2

=== Doubles ===
(United Kingdom) Colin Fleming / (United Kingdom) Ken Skupski def. (France) Sébastien Grosjean / (France) Olivier Patience, 6–1, 6–1
