= 2009 Open d'Orléans – Doubles =

Tennis tournament in France

Doubles
- 2009 Open d'Orléans

Final
- Champions: (United Kingdom) Colin Fleming; (United Kingdom) Ken Skupski
- Runners-up: (France) Sébastien Grosjean; (France) Olivier Patience
- Score: 6–1, 6–1

Events
Singles	Doubles
← 2008 ·	Open d'Orléans	· 2010 →

Sergiy Stakhovsky and Lovro Zovko were the defending champions, but only Zovko tried to defend his 2008 title.
He partnered with Yves Allegro, but they lost to Sébastien Grosjean and Olivier Patience in the quarterfinal.
Colin Fleming and Ken Skupski won in the final 6–1, 6–1, against Grosjean and Patience.

== Seeds ==
1. (Pakistan) Aisam-ul-Haq Qureshi / (United States) Travis Rettenmaier (quarterfinals)
2. (United Kingdom) Colin Fleming / (United Kingdom) Ken Skupski (champions)
3. (Germany) Philipp Marx / (Slovakia) Igor Zelenay (first round)
4. (South Africa) Kevin Anderson / (Australia) Carsten Ball (quarterfinals)

== Draw ==
=== Key ===
- Q = Qualifier
- WC = Wild card
- LL = Lucky loser
- Alt = Alternate
- ITF = ITF entry
- PR = Protected ranking
- SR = Special ranking
- SE = Special exempt
- JE = Junior exempt
- JR = Junior Accelerator Programme entrant
- CO = College Accelerator Programme entrant
- NG = Next Gen Accelerator Program entrant
- w/o = Walkover
- r = Retired
- d = Defaulted

=== Draw ===
First round

Quarterfinals

Semifinals

Finals

1
- (Pakistan) A-u-H Qureshi
- (United States) T Rettenmaier
6
3
[12]

WC
- (France) T Cazes-Carrère
- (France) J Chardy
3
6
[10]

1
- (Pakistan) A-u-H Qureshi
- (United States) T Rettenmaier
6
6^{5}
[7]

- (Australia) R Junaid
- (Czech Republic) L Rosol
6
4
[5]

- (United Kingdom) J Delgado
- (United Kingdom) J Murray
1
7
[10]

- (United Kingdom) J Delgado
- (United Kingdom) J Murray
4
6
[10]

- (United Kingdom) J Delgado
- (United Kingdom) J Murray
3
6
[7]

3
- (Germany) P Marx
- (Slovakia) I Zelenay
6^{5}
6^{5}

WC
- (France) S Grosjean
- (France) O Patience
6
4
[10]

- (Switzerland) Y Allegro
- (Croatia) L Zovko
7
7

- (Switzerland) Y Allegro
- (Croatia) L Zovko
3
6
[5]

WC
- (France) S Grosjean
- (France) O Patience
6
6

WC
- (France) S Grosjean
- (France) O Patience
6
4
[10]

- (France) S Robert
- (France) A Sidorenko
4
3

WC
- (France) S Grosjean
- (France) O Patience
1
1

- (Thailand) Sa Ratiwatana
- (Brazil) M Torres
4
4

2
- (United Kingdom) C Fleming
- (United Kingdom) K Skupski
6
6

- (Belgium) R Bemelmans
- (Belgium) X Malisse
6
6

- (Belgium) R Bemelmans
- (Belgium) X Malisse
6
6

- (United Kingdom) J Marray
- (Italy) A Motti
4
3

4
- (South Africa) K Anderson
- (Australia) C Ball
2
4

4
- (South Africa) K Anderson
- (Australia) C Ball
6
6

- (Belgium) R Bemelmans
- (Belgium) X Malisse
3
6^{6}

WC
- (France) D Descloix
- (France) T Rajaobelina
2
2

2
- (United Kingdom) C Fleming
- (United Kingdom) K Skupski
6
7

- (Slovakia) D Hrbatý
- (Germany) F Moser
6
6

- (Slovakia) D Hrbatý
- (Germany) F Moser
4
4

- (France) D Guez
- (France) J Ouanna
7
0
[5]

2
- (United Kingdom) C Fleming
- (United Kingdom) K Skupski
6
6

2
- (United Kingdom) C Fleming
- (United Kingdom) K Skupski
6^{2}
6
[10]
