= 2008 Grand Prix de Tennis de Lyon – Singles =

Singles
- 2008 Grand Prix de Tennis de Lyon

Final
- Champion: (Sweden) Robin Söderling
- Runner-up: (France) Julien Benneteau
- Score: 6–3, 6–7^{(5–7)}, 6–1

Details
- Draw: 32 (4Q / 3WC)
- Seeds: 8

Events
Singles	Doubles
- Grand Prix de Tennis de Lyon

Sébastien Grosjean was the defending champion, but lost in the first round to Robby Ginepri.

Seventh-seeded Robin Söderling won in the final 6–3, 6–7^{(5–7)}, 6–1, against Julien Benneteau.

== Seeds ==
1. (United States) Andy Roddick (quarterfinals)
2. (France) Richard Gasquet (second round)
3. (France) Jo-Wilfried Tsonga (semifinals)
4. (France) Gilles Simon (semifinals)
5. (Spain) Tommy Robredo (second round)
6. (Croatia) Ivo Karlović (first round)
7. (Sweden) Robin Söderling (champion)
8. (France) Paul-Henri Mathieu (second round)

== Draw ==
Key

- Q = Qualifier
- WC = Wild card
- LL = Lucky loser
- Alt = Alternate
- ITF = ITF entry
- PR = Protected ranking
- SR = Special ranking
- SE = Special exempt
- JE = Junior exempt
- JR = Junior Accelerator Programme entrant
- CO = College Accelerator Programme entrant
- NG = Next Gen Accelerator Program entrant
- w/o = Walkover
- r = Retired
- d = Defaulted

=== Finals ===
Semifinals
7	(Sweden) Robin Söderling	5	6	6
4	(France) Gilles Simon	7	3	3
3	(France) Jo-Wilfried Tsonga	6^{4}	5
(France) Julien Benneteau	7^{7}	7

Final
7	(Sweden) Robin Söderling	6	6^{5}	6
(France) Julien Benneteau	3	7^{7}	1

=== Top half ===
First round
1	(United States) A Roddick	7^{7}	6
(France) N Mahut	6^{5}	4
(United States) R Ginepri	6^{4}	6	6
WC	(France) S Grosjean	7^{7}	4	4
Q	(Belgium) C Rochus	6	6
(Luxembourg) G Müller	2	4
Q	(France) T Ascione	4	1
7	(Sweden) R Söderling	6	6
4	(France) G Simon	2	6	6
(Argentina) J Mónaco	6	4	1
Q	(France) D Guez	2	5
(Italy) A Seppi	6	7
WC	(France) J Ouanna	6^{2}	7^{7}	6
(Croatia) I Ljubičić	7^{7}	6^{5}	4
(Ecuador) N Lapentti	7^{7}	6
6	(Croatia) I Karlović	6^{4}	3

Second round
1	(United States) A Roddick	7^{7}	7^{7}
(United States) R Ginepri	6^{5}	6^{3}
Q	(Belgium) C Rochus	1	2
7	(Sweden) R Söderling	6	6
4	(France) G Simon	7^{7}	5	6
(Italy) A Seppi	6^{5}	7	4
WC	(France) J Ouanna	6	1	6
(Ecuador) N Lapentti	3	6	3

Quarterfinals
1	(United States) A Roddick	6^{5}	6^{5}
7	(Sweden) R Söderling	7^{7}	7^{7}
4	(France) G Simon	6	7
WC	(France) J Ouanna	3	5

Semifinals
7	(Sweden) R Söderling	5	6	6
4	(France) G Simon	7	3	3

=== Bottom half ===
First round
8	(France) P-H Mathieu	6	6
(Argentina) G Cañas	3	4
(Spain) JC Ferrero	6	7
(United States) S Querrey	3	5
(France) F Santoro	6	6
(Italy) F Fognini	4	1
(France) M Gicquel	5	6	3
3	(France) J-W Tsonga	7	4	6
5	(Spain) T Robredo	6	6
(France) M Llodra	4	3
(France) J Benneteau	6	6
(France) A Clément	3	2
WC	(Czech Republic) R Štěpánek	4	6	3
(Belgium) S Darcis	6	3	6
Q	(Colombia) S Giraldo	7	3	6^{3}
2	(France) R Gasquet	5	6	7^{7}

Second round
8	(France) P-H Mathieu	4	1
(Spain) JC Ferrero	6	6
(France) F Santoro	2	7	3
3	(France) J-W Tsonga	6	5	6
5	(Spain) T Robredo	2	2
(France) J Benneteau	6	6
(Belgium) S Darcis	6	3	7^{7}
2	(France) R Gasquet	4	6	6^{5}

Quarterfinals
(Spain) JC Ferrero	6^{5}	1
3	(France) J-W Tsonga	7^{7}	6
(France) J Benneteau	6	6
(Belgium) S Darcis	3	2

Semifinals
3	(France) J-W Tsonga	6^{4}	5
(France) J Benneteau	7^{7}	7
