= 2010 Open d'Orléans – Singles =

Tennis tournament in France

Singles
- 2010 Open d'Orléans

Final
- Champion: (France) Nicolas Mahut
- Runner-up: (Bulgaria) Grigor Dimitrov
- Score: 2–6, 7–6(6), 7–6(4)

Events
Singles	Doubles
← 2009 ·	Open d'Orléans	· 2011 →

Xavier Malisse, who was the defending champion, lost to Ilija Bozoljac already in the second round.
Nicolas Mahut won in the final 2–6, 7–6(6), 7–6(4), against Grigor Dimitrov.

== Seeds ==
1. (France) Michaël Llodra (semifinals)
2. (Belgium) Xavier Malisse (second round)
3. (Slovakia) Lukáš Lacko (first round)
4. (France) Stéphane Robert (second round)
5. (Germany) Björn Phau (quarterfinals)
6. (France) Adrian Mannarino (second round, withdrew)
7. (Jamaica) Dustin Brown (first round)
8. (Belgium) Steve Darcis (withdrew)

== Draw ==
=== Key ===
- Q = Qualifier
- WC = Wild card
- LL = Lucky loser
- Alt = Alternate
- ITF = ITF entry
- PR = Protected ranking
- SR = Special ranking
- SE = Special exempt
- JE = Junior exempt
- JR = Junior Accelerator Programme entrant
- CO = College Accelerator Programme entrant
- NG = Next Gen Accelerator Program entrant
- w/o = Walkover
- r = Retired
- d = Defaulted

=== Finals ===
Semifinals
1/WC	(France) Michaël Llodra	6^{4}	6	5
(Bulgaria) Grigor Dimitrov	7	3	7
(France) David Guez	4	2
(France) Nicolas Mahut	6	6

Final
(Bulgaria) Grigor Dimitrov	6	6^{6}	6^{4}
(France) Nicolas Mahut	2	7	7

=== Top half ===
First round
1/WC	(France) M Llodra	6	6
(Republic of Ireland) C Niland	3	4
(Germany) D Gremelmayr	2	7	1
(France) J Ouanna	6	6^{2}	6
(France) É Roger-Vasselin	6	6
(Netherlands) I Sijsling	2	2
Q	(France) M Rodrigues	7	2	1
5	(Germany) B Phau	6^{5}	6	6
3	(Slovakia) L Lacko	5	3
(Bulgaria) G Dimitrov	7	6
(Austria) M Fischer	7	6
WC	(France) V Millot	6^{4}	4
WC	(France) A Sidorenko	1	7	7
(Switzerland) S Bohli	6	6^{3}	6^{3}
(Spain) R Bautista Agut	6	7
LL	(Austria) P Oswald	3	6^{3}

Second round
1/WC	(France) M Llodra	7	7
(France) J Ouanna	6^{9}	6^{8}
(France) É Roger-Vasselin	6^{3}	6	6^{8}
5	(Germany) B Phau	7	4	7
(Bulgaria) G Dimitrov	6	7
(Austria) M Fischer	4	6^{3}
WC	(France) A Sidorenko	6^{5}	1
(Spain) R Bautista Agut	7	6

Quarterfinals
1/WC	(France) M Llodra	6	6
5	(Germany) B Phau	3	4
(Bulgaria) G Dimitrov	3	6	7
(Spain) R Bautista Agut	6	2	6^{6}

Semifinals
1/WC	(France) M Llodra	6^{4}	6	5
(Bulgaria) G Dimitrov	7	3	7

=== Bottom half ===
First round
7	(Jamaica) D Brown	6	6^{6}	6^{5}
Q	(France) R Jouan	4	7	7
PR	(Canada) F Dancevic	5	1
(France) D Guez	7	6
SE	(France) M Gicquel	3	4
Q	(France) N Renavand	6	6
(Germany) J Reister	2	7	3
4	(France) S Robert	6	6^{3}	6
6	(France) A Mannarino	4	6	6
Q	(France) P-H Herbert	6	2	0
(Slovakia) K Beck	6^{3}	5
(France) N Mahut	7	7
(Serbia) I Bozoljac	6	6
(Italy) S Bolelli	2	2
(Czech Republic) L Rosol	6^{5}	1
2/WC	(Belgium) X Malisse	7	6

Second round
Q	(France) R Jouan	2	3
(France) D Guez	6	6
Q	(France) N Renavand	6	6
4	(France) S Robert	0	4
6	(France) A Mannarino
(France) N Mahut	w/o
(Serbia) I Bozoljac	7	6
2/WC	(Belgium) X Malisse	6^{7}	4

Quarterfinals
(France) D Guez	4	6	6
Q	(France) N Renavand	6	2	3
(France) N Mahut	6	6
(Serbia) I Bozoljac	3	4

Semifinals
(France) D Guez	4	2
(France) N Mahut	6	6
