= 2007 Grand Prix de Tennis de Lyon =

- Date: 22–28 October 2007
- Edition: 21st
- Category: International Series
- Draw: 32S / 16D
- Prize money: $775,000
- Surface: Carpet / indoor
- Location: Lyon, France
- Venue: Palais des Sports de Gerland

Champions

Singles
- (France) Sébastien Grosjean

Doubles
- (France) Sébastien Grosjean / (France) Jo-Wilfried Tsonga
← 2006 ·	Grand Prix de Tennis de Lyon	· 2008 →

The 2007 Grand Prix de Tennis de Lyon was a men's tennis tournament played on indoor carpet courts. It was the 21st edition of the Grand Prix de Tennis de Lyon, and was part of the International Series of the 2007 ATP Tour. It took place at the Palais des Sports de Gerland in Lyon, France, from 22 October through 28 October 2007.

The singles field featured ATP No. 5, Australian Open semifinalist, Queen's Club and Washington champion, 2005 Lyon winner Andy Roddick, Sopot and Metz titlist Tommy Robredo, and Australian Open semifinalist and Memphis winner Tommy Haas. Other seeded players were Wimbledon semifinalist, Mumbai titlist Richard Gasquet, Doha and 's-Hertogenbosch Ivan Ljubičić, Juan Mónaco, Nicolás Almagro and Gilles Simon.

== Finals ==
=== Singles ===
(France) Sébastien Grosjean defeated (France) Marc Gicquel 7–6^{(7–5)}, 6–4

- It was Sébastien Grosjean's 1st title of the year, and his 4th overall.

=== Doubles ===
(France) Sébastien Grosjean / (France) Jo-Wilfried Tsonga defeated (Poland) Łukasz Kubot / (Croatia) Lovro Zovko 6–4, 6–3
