= 2010 Open d'Orléans – Doubles =

Tennis tournament in France

Doubles
- 2010 Open d'Orléans

Final
- Champions: (France) Pierre-Hugues Herbert; (France) Nicolas Renavand
- Runners-up: (France) Sébastien Grosjean; (France) Nicolas Mahut
- Score: 7–6(3), 1–6, [10–6]

Events
Singles	Doubles
← 2009 ·	Open d'Orléans	· 2011 →

Colin Fleming and Ken Skupski were the defending champions, but they chose to start in Moscow.
Pierre-Hugues Herbert and Nicolas Renavand, which received wildcards to the doubles main draw, won the final 7–6(3), 1–6, [10–6], against Sébastien Grosjean and Nicolas Mahut.

== Seeds ==
1. (Jamaica) Dustin Brown / (Netherlands) Rogier Wassen (first round)
2. (Thailand) Sanchai Ratiwatana / (Thailand) Sonchat Ratiwatana (semifinals)
3. (United States) Scott Lipsky / (United Kingdom) Jamie Murray (quarterfinals)
4. (United States) James Cerretani / (Czech Republic) David Škoch (first round)

== Draw ==
=== Key ===
- Q = Qualifier
- WC = Wild card
- LL = Lucky loser
- Alt = Alternate
- ITF = ITF entry
- PR = Protected ranking
- SR = Special ranking
- SE = Special exempt
- JE = Junior exempt
- JR = Junior Accelerator Programme entrant
- CO = College Accelerator Programme entrant
- NG = Next Gen Accelerator Program entrant
- w/o = Walkover
- r = Retired
- d = Defaulted

=== Draw ===
First round

Quarterfinals

Semifinals

Finals

1
- (Jamaica) D Brown
- (Netherlands) R Wassen
2
3

- (France) D Guez
- (France) J Ouanna
6
6

- (France) D Guez
- (France) J Ouanna

- (France) S Grosjean
- (France) N Mahut
6
6

- (France) S Grosjean
- (France) N Mahut
w/o

- (Serbia) I Bozoljac
- (Canada) F Dancevic
4
2

- (France) S Grosjean
- (France) N Mahut
7
6

4
- (United States) J Cerretani
- (Czech Republic) D Škoch
1
2

- (South Africa) J Coetzee
- (Poland) M Kowalczyk
5
4

- (South Africa) J Coetzee
- (Poland) M Kowalczyk
6
6

- (South Africa) J Coetzee
- (Poland) M Kowalczyk
6
6

ALT
- (Spain) R Bautista Agut
- (Spain) E Carril
w/o

ALT
- (Spain) R Bautista Agut
- (Spain) E Carril
3
1

- (Belgium) X Malisse
- (Netherlands) I Sijsling

- (France) S Grosjean
- (France) N Mahut
6^{3}
6
[6]

WC
- (France) O Charroin
- (France) A Sidorenko
2
6^{3}

WC
- (France) P-H Herbert
- (France) N Renavand
7
1
[10]

- (United Kingdom) J Delgado
- (United Kingdom) J Marray
6
7

- (United Kingdom) J Delgado
- (United Kingdom) J Marray
6
7

- (Austria) M Fischer
- (Austria) P Oswald
2
6^{3}

3
- (United States) S Lipsky
- (United Kingdom) J Murray
4
6^{6}

3
- (United States) S Lipsky
- (United Kingdom) J Murray
6
7

- (United Kingdom) J Delgado
- (United Kingdom) J Marray
6^{4}
5

WC
- (France) P-H Herbert
- (France) N Renavand
6
6

WC
- (France) P-H Herbert
- (France) N Renavand
7
7

WC
- (France) R Jouan
- (France) M Rodrigues
1
3

WC
- (France) P-H Herbert
- (France) N Renavand
6
6

- (Poland) T Bednarek
- (Czech Republic) L Rosol
6
6^{5}
[7]

2
- (Thailand) Sa Ratiwatana
- (Thailand) So Ratiwatana
0
3

2
- (Thailand) Sa Ratiwatana
- (Thailand) So Ratiwatana
4
7
[10]
