= 2009 Grand Prix de Tennis de Lyon – Doubles =

Doubles
- 2009 Grand Prix de Tennis de Lyon

Final
- Champions: (France) Julien Benneteau (France) Nicolas Mahut
- Runners-up: (France) Arnaud Clément (France) Sébastien Grosjean
- Score: 6–4, 7–6^{(8–6)}

Details
- Draw: 16
- Seeds: 4

Events
Singles	Doubles
← 2008 ·	Grand Prix de Tennis de Lyon	· 2010 →

Michaël Llodra and Andy Ram were the defending champions, but Ram chose to participate at the St. Petersburg Open instead.
Llodra partnered up with Marc Gicquel, but they lost in the quarterfinals against Simone Bolelli and Ivan Ljubičić
Julien Benneteau and Nicolas Mahut won in the final 6–4, 7–6^{(8–6)} against Arnaud Clément and Sébastien Grosjean.

== Seeds ==
1. (South Africa) Wesley Moodie / (Belgium) Dick Norman (first round)
2. (Brazil) Bruno Soares / (Zimbabwe) Kevin Ullyett (first round)
3. (Czech Republic) Martin Damm / (Sweden) Robert Lindstedt (first round, retired)
4. (Sweden) Simon Aspelin / (Australia) Paul Hanley (first round)

== Draw ==
=== Key ===
- Q = Qualifier
- WC = Wild card
- LL = Lucky loser
- Alt = Alternate
- SE = Special exempt
- PR = Protected ranking
- ITF = ITF entry
- JE = Junior exempt
- w/o = Walkover
- r = Retired
- d = Defaulted
- SR = Special ranking

First round
1	(South Africa) W Moodie (Belgium) D Norman	6^{4}	6^{3}
WC	(France) J Benneteau (France) N Mahut	7^{7}	7^{7}
(Spain) Ó Hernández (Spain) A Montañés	3	7^{7}	[7]
(Argentina) L Mayer (Argentina) M Vassallo Argüello	6	6^{4}	[10]
3	(Czech Republic) M Damm (Sweden) R Lindstedt	5	1^{r}
(South Africa) J Coetzee (Australia) S Huss	7	2
(Brazil) M Melo (Brazil) A Sá	6	6
(Germany) B Becker (France) F Santoro	2	3
(Italy) S Bolelli (Croatia) I Ljubičić	6	3	[10]
(United Kingdom) R Hutchins (Romania) H Tecău	3	6	[6]
(France) M Gicquel (France) M Llodra	6	6
4	(Sweden) S Aspelin (Australia) P Hanley	3	4
(United States) E Butorac (United States) R Ram	3	6	[8]
(Argentina) L Arnold Ker (Argentina) J Mónaco	6	3	[10]
WC	(France) A Clément (France) S Grosjean	6	7^{7}
2	(Brazil) B Soares (Zimbabwe) K Ullyett	4	6^{1}

Quarterfinals
WC	(France) J Benneteau (France) N Mahut	6	7^{7}
(Argentina) L Mayer (Argentina) M Vassallo Argüello	4	6^{3}
(South Africa) J Coetzee (Australia) S Huss	3	4
(Brazil) M Melo (Brazil) A Sá	6	6
(Italy) S Bolelli (Croatia) I Ljubičić	4	7	[12]
(France) M Gicquel (France) M Llodra	6	5	[10]
(Argentina) L Arnold Ker (Argentina) J Mónaco	4	1
WC	(France) A Clément (France) S Grosjean	6	6

Semifinals
WC	(France) J Benneteau (France) N Mahut	6	6	[10]
(Brazil) M Melo (Brazil) A Sá	2	7	[4]
(Italy) S Bolelli (Croatia) I Ljubičić	3	4
WC	(France) A Clément (France) S Grosjean	6	6

Finals
WC	(France) J Benneteau (France) N Mahut	6	7^{8}
WC	(France) A Clément (France) S Grosjean	4	6^{6}
