= 2007 Grand Prix de Tennis de Lyon – Singles =

Singles
- 2007 Grand Prix de Tennis de Lyon

Final
- Champions: (France) Sébastien Grosjean
- Runners-up: (France) Marc Gicquel
- Score: 7–6^{(7–4)}, 6–4

Details
- Draw: 32
- Seeds: 8

Events
Singles	Doubles
- Grand Prix de Tennis de Lyon

Richard Gasquet was the defending champion of this ATP Tour indoor tennis tournament, but lost in the second round to Jo-Wilfried Tsonga.

Sébastien Grosjean won in the final 7–6^{(7–4)}, 6–4, against Marc Gicquel.

== Seeds ==
1. (United States) Andy Roddick (first round)
2. (Spain) Tommy Robredo (first round)
3. (Germany) Tommy Haas (withdrew)
4. (France) Richard Gasquet (second round)
5. (Croatia) Ivan Ljubičić (quarterfinals)
6. (Argentina) Juan Mónaco (second round)
7. (Spain) Nicolás Almagro (first round)
8. (France) Gilles Simon (second round)

== Draw ==
Key

- Q = Qualifier
- WC = Wild card
- LL = Lucky loser
- Alt = Alternate
- ITF = ITF entry
- PR = Protected ranking
- SR = Special ranking
- SE = Special exempt
- JE = Junior exempt
- JR = Junior Accelerator Programme entrant
- CO = College Accelerator Programme entrant
- NG = Next Gen Accelerator Program entrant
- w/o = Walkover
- r = Retired
- d = Defaulted

=== Finals ===
Semifinals
(France) Sébastien Grosjean	6	6
(France) Jo-Wilfried Tsonga	1	2
Q	(Colombia) Alejandro Falla	6	2	6^{7}
(France) Marc Gicquel	4	6	7^{9}

Final
(France) Sébastien Grosjean	7^{7}	6
(France) Marc Gicquel	6^{5}	4

=== Top half ===
First round
1	(United States) A Roddick	6^{5}	6	4
(France) F Santoro	7^{7}	2	6
(France) S Grosjean	6	6
Q	(France) R Cadart	3	2
WC	(France) É Roger-Vasselin	7	3	1
(France) J Benneteau	5	6	6
(Romania) A Pavel	2	6	1
8	(France) G Simon	6	2	6
4	(France) R Gasquet	7^{7}	6
Q	(Belgium) C Rochus	6^{5}	3
(United States) V Spadea	3	4
(France) J-W Tsonga	6	6
(Belgium) O Rochus	7^{8}	6
(France) M Llodra	6^{6}	2
(United States) M Fish	2	6	7^{7}
7	(Spain) N Almagro	6	3	6^{4}

Second round
(France) F Santoro	6	1	2
(France) S Grosjean	4	6	6
(France) J Benneteau	7	6
8	(France) G Simon	5	4
4	(France) R Gasquet	4	4
(France) J-W Tsonga	6	6
(Belgium) O Rochus	6^{5}	7^{8}	7^{17}
(United States) M Fish	7^{7}	6^{6}	6^{15}

Quarterfinals
(France) S Grosjean	6^{6}	6	7^{7}
(France) J Benneteau	7^{8}	2	6^{4}
(France) J-W Tsonga	6	6
(Belgium) O Rochus	3	2

Semifinals
(France) S Grosjean	6	6
(France) J-W Tsonga	1	2

=== Bottom half ===
First round
5	(Croatia) I Ljubičić	7^{7}	7^{9}
(United States) S Querrey	6^{5}	6^{7}
WC	(France) T Ascione	6	7^{7}
(Serbia) J Tipsarević	3	6^{3}
LL	(Austria) O Marach	7^{9}	7^{7}
(Italy) A Seppi	6^{7}	6^{5}
(Russia) I Andreev	6^{2}	1
Q	(Colombia) A Falla	7^{7}	6
6	(Argentina) J Mónaco	6^{11}	6	7^{7}
Q	(France) S de Chaunac	7^{13}	3	6^{2}
(Argentina) D Hartfield	7^{10}	6
(France) N Mahut	6^{8}	4
(France) A Clément	6^{0}	6^{3}
(Germany) B Becker	7^{7}	7^{7}
(France) M Gicquel	6	7^{7}
2	(Spain) T Robredo	4	6^{5}

Second round
5	(Croatia) I Ljubičić	6	6^{4}	7^{7}
WC	(France) T Ascione	3	7^{7}	6^{5}
LL	(Austria) O Marach	2	1
Q	(Colombia) A Falla	6	6
6	(Argentina) J Mónaco	4	3
(Argentina) D Hartfield	6	6
(Germany) B Becker	3	3
(France) M Gicquel	6	6

Quarterfinals
5	(Croatia) I Ljubičić	5	7^{7}	5
Q	(Colombia) A Falla	7	6^{3}	7
(Argentina) D Hartfield	5	3
(France) M Gicquel	7	6

Semifinals
Q	(Colombia) A Falla	6	2	6^{7}
(France) M Gicquel	4	6	7^{9}
