= 2008 Grand Prix de Tennis de Lyon =

- Date: 20–26 October 2008
- Edition: 22nd
- Category: International Series
- Draw: 32S / 16D
- Prize money: € 713,000
- Surface: Carpet / indoor
- Location: Lyon, France
- Venue: Palais des Sports de Gerland

Champions

Singles
- (Sweden) Robin Söderling

Doubles
- (France) Michaël Llodra / (Israel) Andy Ram
← 2007 ·	Grand Prix de Tennis de Lyon	· 2009 →

The 2008 Grand Prix de Tennis de Lyon was a men's tennis tournament played on indoor carpet courts. It was the 22nd edition of the Grand Prix de Tennis de Lyon, and was part of the International Series of the 2008 ATP Tour. It took place at the Palais des Sports de Gerland in Lyon, France, from 20 October through 26 October 2008.

The singles line up featured ATP No. 8, US Open quarterfinalist, San Jose, Dubai and Beijing champion, Los Angeles runner-up Andy Roddick, Stuttgart finalist Richard Gasquet, and Australian Open runner-up, Bangkok winner Jo-Wilfried Tsonga. Also present were Casablanca, Indianapolis and Bucharest titlist Gilles Simon, Båstad winner Tommy Robredo, Ivo Karlović, Robin Söderling and Paul-Henri Mathieu.

Seventh-seeded Robin Söderling won the singles title.

== Finals ==
=== Singles ===
(Sweden) Robin Söderling defeated (France) Julien Benneteau, 6–3, 6–7^{(5–7)}, 6–1

- It was Robin Söderling's 1st title of the year, and his 3rd overall. It was his 2nd win at the event.

=== Doubles ===
(France) Michaël Llodra / (Israel) Andy Ram defeated (Australia) Stephen Huss / (United Kingdom) Ross Hutchins, 6–3, 5–7, [10–8]
