= Lovro Zovko =

Croatian tennis player

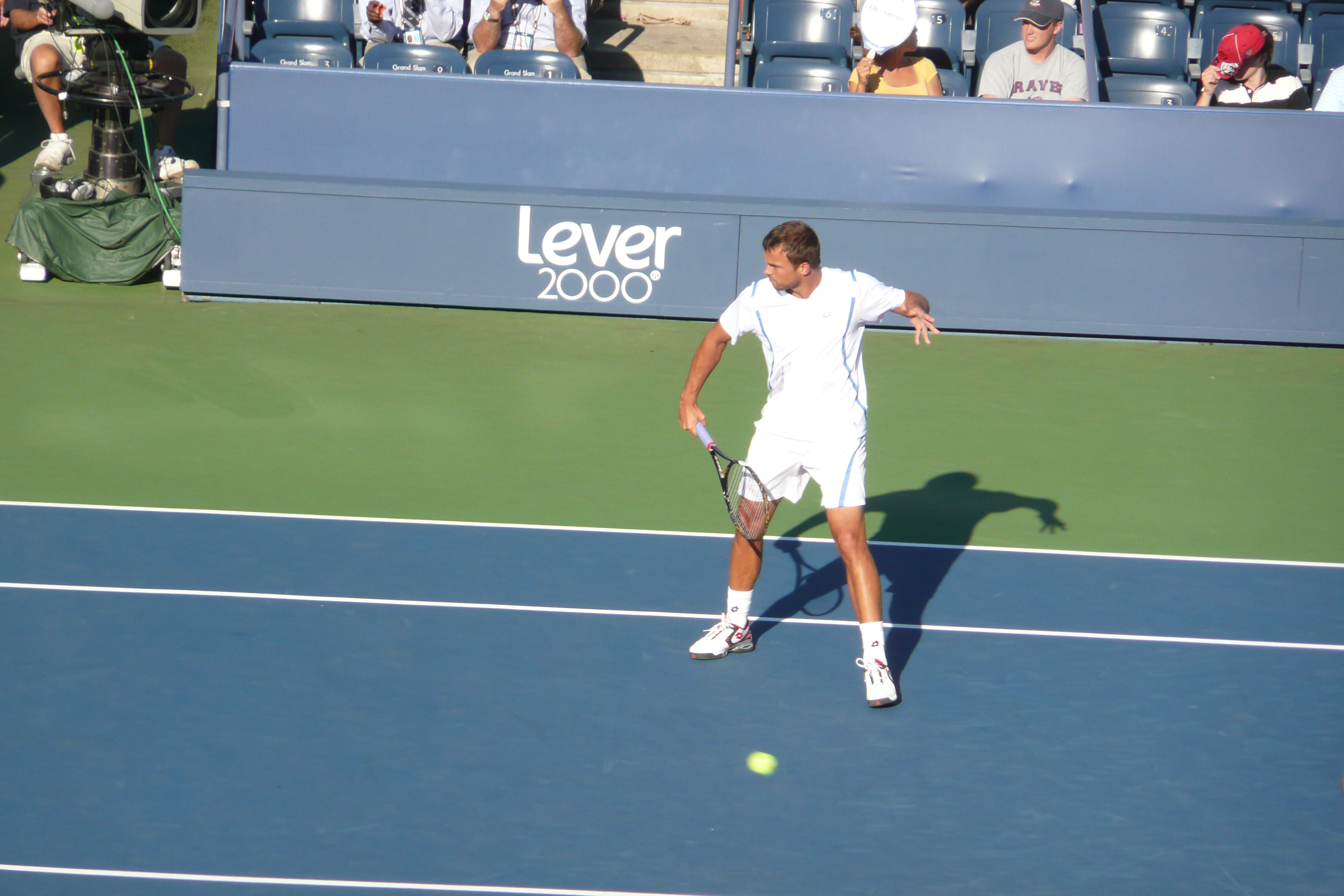
- Country (sports): Croatia
- Residence: Zagreb, Croatia
- Born: 18 March 1981 (age 44) Zagreb, SR Croatia, Yugoslavia
- Height: 1.90 m (6 ft 3 in)
- Turned pro: 1999
- Retired: 2015
- Plays: Right-handed (two-handed backhand)
- Prize money: $623,479

Singles
- Career record: 7–13
- Career titles: 0
- Highest ranking: No. 151 (27 January 2003)

Grand Slam singles results
- Australian Open: Q1 (2002, 2003)
- French Open: Q1 (2003)
- Wimbledon: Q1 (2002, 2003)
- US Open: Q3 (2002)

Doubles
- Career record: 53-89
- Career titles: 0
- Highest ranking: No. 45 (6 October 2008)

Grand Slam doubles results
- Australian Open: 1R (2007, 2008, 2009, 2011)
- French Open: 1R (2002, 2006, 2008, 2009)
- Wimbledon: 2R (2002, 2006)
- US Open: 3R (2008)

Lovro Zovko (born 18 March 1981) is a former professional tennis player from Croatia.

== Tennis career ==
=== Juniors ===
As a junior Zovko reached as high as No. 9 in the world rankings in 1998 (and No. 10 in doubles).

=== Pro tour ===
Early in 2000 and 2001, Zovko reached the doubles final in Umag with Ivan Ljubičić.

In 2007, Zovko made the doubles finals of the Kremlin Cup (Moscow) event with Tomáš Cibulec before losing to Marat Safin and Dmitry Tursunov in the final, 6–4, 6–2. Zovko reached the 2007 Grand Prix de Tennis de Lyon doubles final with Łukasz Kubot, losing to Sébastien Grosjean and Jo-Wilfried Tsonga in the final, 6–4, 6–3.

== ATP career finals ==
=== Doubles: 5 (0–5) ===
Legend (pre/post 2009) Grand Slam (0–0) Tennis Masters Cup / ATP World Tour Finals (0–0) ATP Masters Series / ATP World Tour Masters 1000 (0–0) ATP International Series Gold / ATP World Tour 500 series (0–0) ATP International Series / ATP World Tour 250 series (0–5)	Titles by surface Hard (0–2) Clay (0–3) Grass (0–0) Carpet (0–0)

Result	W/L	Date	Tournament	Surface	Partner	Opponent	Score
Loss	0–1	Jul 2000	Umag, Croatia	Clay	(Croatia) Ivan Ljubičić	(Spain) Albert Portas (Spain) Álex López Morón	1–6, 6–7^{(2)}
Loss	0–2	Jul 2001	Umag, Croatia	Clay	(Croatia) Ivan Ljubičić	(Argentina) Sergio Roitman (Argentina) Andrés Schneiter	2–6, 5–7
Loss	0–3	Oct 2007	Moscow, Russia	Hard	(Czech Republic) Tomáš Cibulec	(Russia) Marat Safin (Russia) Dmitry Tursunov	4–6, 2–6
Loss	0–4	Oct 2007	Lyon, France	Hard	(Poland) Łukasz Kubot	(France) Sébastien Grosjean (France) Jo-Wilfried Tsonga	4–6, 3–6
Loss	0–5	Jul 2011	Umag, Croatia	Clay	(Croatia) Marin Čilić	(Italy) Simone Bolelli (Italy) Fabio Fognini	3–6, 7–5, [7–10]
