= Sébastien Grosjean =

French tennis player

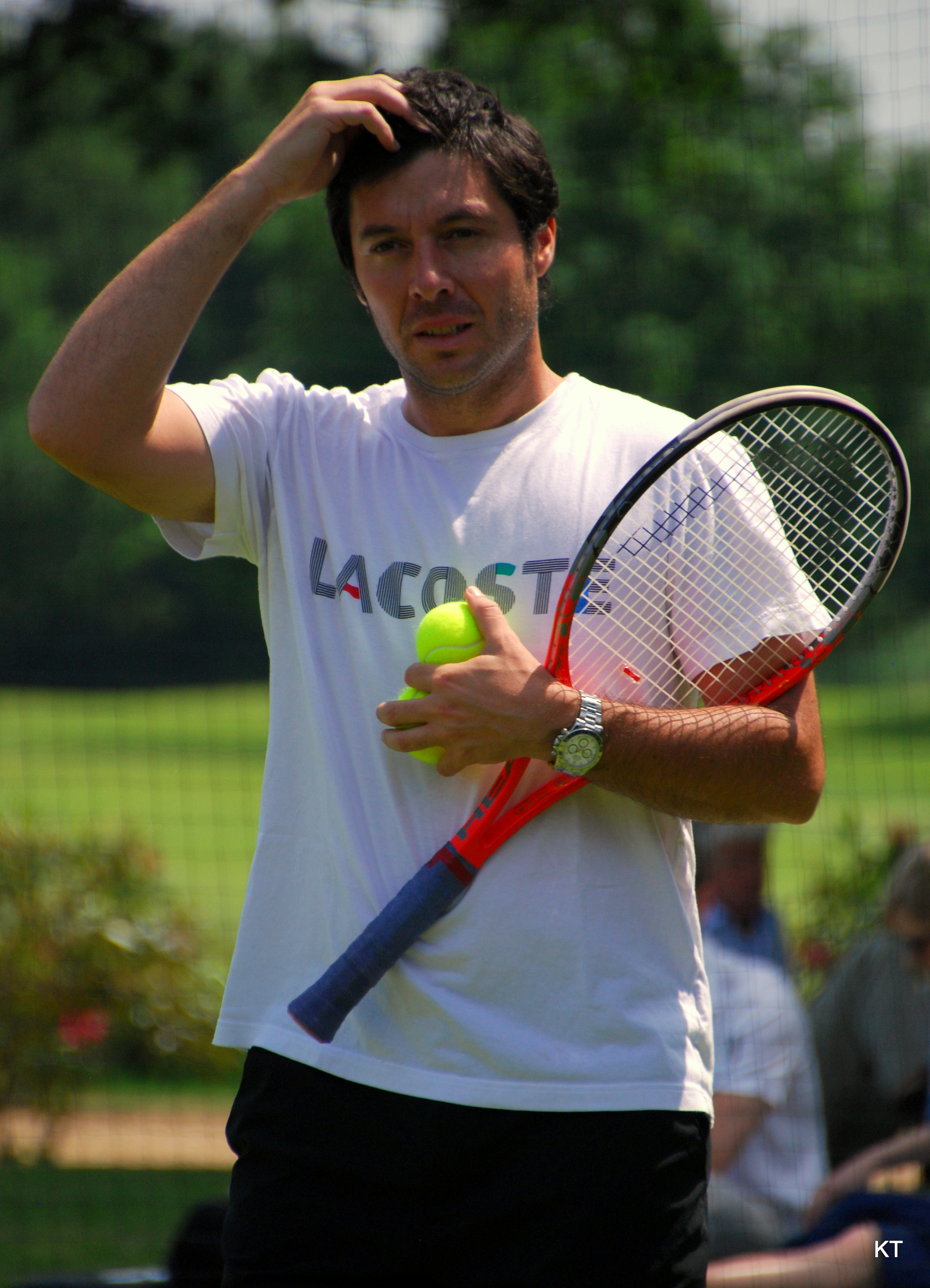
- Sébastien Grosjean (2013)
- Country (sports): France
- Residence: Boca Raton, Florida, United States
- Born: 29 May 1978 (age 48) Marseille, France
- Height: 1.75 m (5 ft 9 in)
- Turned pro: 1996
- Retired: 2010
- Plays: Right-handed (two-handed backhand)
- Prize money: $8,131,803

Singles
- Career record: 341–247 (58.0%)
- Career titles: 4
- Highest ranking: No. 4 (28 October 2002)

Grand Slam singles results
- Australian Open: SF (2001)
- French Open: SF (2001)
- Wimbledon: SF (2003, 2004)
- US Open: 3R (2000, 2005, 2007)

Other tournaments
- Tour Finals: F (2001)
- Olympic Games: QF (2000)

Doubles
- Career record: 82–100
- Career titles: 5
- Highest ranking: No. 52 (12 April 2004)

Grand Slam doubles results
- Australian Open: 3R (2001)
- French Open: 1R (1996, 1997, 1998, 1999, 2000, 2007, 2008, 2009)
- US Open: 3R (2008)

Mixed doubles
- Career record: 2–2
- Career titles: 0

Grand Slam mixed doubles results
- French Open: 3R (1998)

Team competitions
- Davis Cup: W (2001)

Coaching career
- * Richard Gasquet, * Nick Kyrgios, * Arthur Fils
- Last updated on: 12 October 2022.

Sébastien René Grosjean (French pronunciation: [sebastjɛ̃ ʁəne ɡʁoʒɑ̃]; born 29 May 1978) is a French tennis coach and a former professional player. Grosjean reached the semifinals at the 2001 Australian and French Opens, and at Wimbledon in 2003 and 2004. He finished eight consecutive seasons ranked in the top 30 (1999–2006), peaking at world No. 4 in October 2002. He is currently the director of the Open de Roanne.

== Career ==
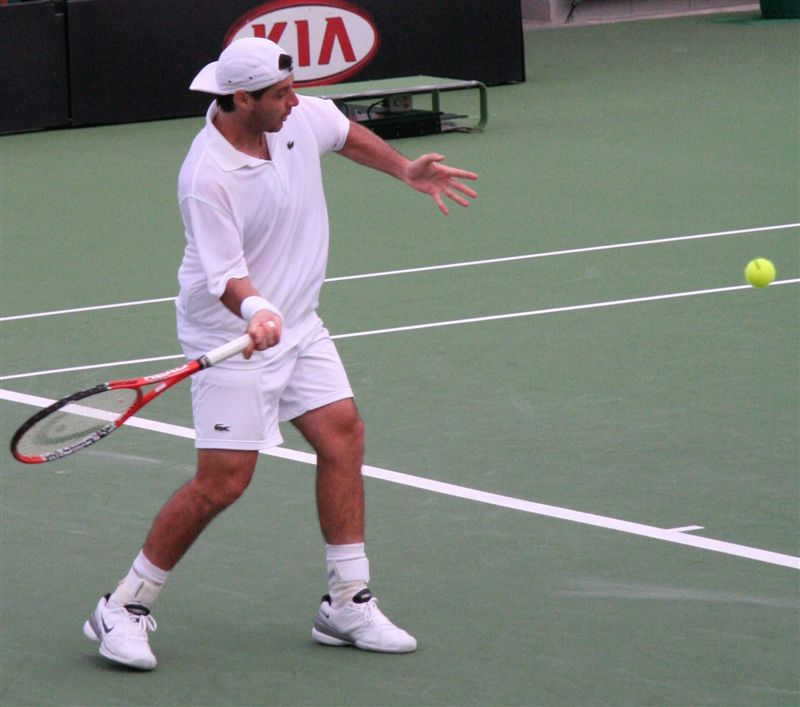
Grosjean at the 2007 Australian Open

=== Juniors ===
As a junior, Grosjean posted a 90-20 singles record and a 58-12 doubles record, winning the 1996 French Open boys' doubles. He reached Junior World No. 1 in both singles and doubles in December 1996, the first player to accomplish the feat since Jason Stoltenberg in 1987.

=== Pro tour ===
Grosjean joined the professional tour in 1996. In 2003 and 2004, he reached the final of the Queen's London Tournament. In the same two years, he also reached the semifinals of Wimbledon. He finished 2001 as the No. 1 player from his country and for the first time in the top 10 becoming the first Frenchman to finish a year in the top 10 since Cédric Pioline in 1993. In 2001, Grosjean won the Davis Cup with the French team.

He has made four Grand Slam semifinal appearances. In addition to his two Wimbledon runs, he also reached the 2001 French Open semifinals. His most famous chance was at the 2001 Australian Open against Arnaud Clément. Grosjean led two sets to love and had a match point in the fourth set before Clément prevailed. This was long considered the worst 'choke' in five-set history, until the 2004 French Open final.

He won his fourth singles title at the 2007 Grand Prix de Tennis de Lyon, with a victory over countryman Marc Gicquel. He also won the doubles final with Jo-Wilfried Tsonga as a wildcard team, where they upset the first and third seeds.

== Coaching career ==
Grosjean retired from professional tennis in May 2010. He coached Richard Gasquet from 2011 to 2016 (co-coached with Sergi Bruguera 2014-2016).

In December 2018, he was named the Davis Cup captain for France. He coached Arthur Fils from October 2023, after he stepped down from his Davis Cup captain role, until March 2025 (co-coach with Bruegera until May 2024).

== Playing style ==
Considered one of the more popular players on the circuit, he is lauded for his attractive, graceful style and classical skills. Grosjean is known for his extreme forehand, his best shot, he utilizes something of a western grip, which is hit at high velocities. He was sponsored by Lacoste in apparel and Head rackets. He used the Head Radical Tour TwinTube 630 XL under various paint jobs throughout his career.

== Personal life ==
Grosjean married his wife Marie-Pierre on 16 November 1998 and has a daughter named Lola (born 11 October 1998), a son named Tom (2002), and a daughter named Sam (2006). The family resided in Boca Raton, Florida (U.S.), where Grosjean trained at the Evert Tennis Academy. He is affectionately nicknamed 'Big John' by fans, a literal translation of his surname into English.

== Major finals ==
=== Year-end championships finals ===
==== Singles: 1 (1 runner-up) ====
Result	Year	Championship	Surface	Opponent	Score
Loss	2001	Masters Cup	Hard (i)	(Australia) Lleyton Hewitt	3–6, 3–6, 4–6

=== Masters Series finals ===
==== Singles: 2 (1 title, 1 runner-up) ====
Result	Year	Tournament	Surface	Opponent	Score
Loss	1999	Miami Masters	Hard	(Netherlands) Richard Krajicek	6–4, 1–6, 2–6, 5–7
Win	2001	Paris Masters	Carpet (i)	(Russia) Yevgeny Kafelnikov	7–6^{(7–3)}, 6–1, 6–7^{(5–7)}, 6–4

== ATP career finals ==
=== Singles: 13 (4 titles, 9 runner-ups) ===
Legend Grand Slam Tournaments (0–0) ATP World Tour Finals (0–1) ATP Masters Series (1–1) ATP Championship Series (0–1) ATP World Series (3–6)	Finals by surface Hard (1–4) Clay (0–3) Grass (1–2) Carpet (2–0)	Finals by setting Outdoors (1–7) Indoors (3–2)

Result	W–L	Date	Tournament	Tier	Surface	Opponent	Score
Loss	0–1	May 1999	Miami, United States	Masters Series	Hard	(Netherlands) Richard Krajicek	6–4, 1–6, 2–6, 5–7
Loss	0–2	May 1999	Atlanta, United States	World Series	Clay	(Austria) Stefan Koubek	1–6, 2–6
Loss	0–3	Apr 2000	Casablanca, Morocco	World Series	Clay	(Spain) Fernando Vicente	4–6, 6–4, 6–7^{(3–7)}
Win	1–3	Jun 2000	Nottingham, United Kingdom	World Series	Grass	(Zimbabwe) Byron Black	7–6^{(9–7)}, 6–3
Loss	1–4	Feb 2001	Marseille, France	World Series	Hard	(Russia) Yevgeny Kafelnikov	6–7^{(5–7)}, 2–6
Win	2–4	Nov 2001	Paris, France	Masters Series	Carpet	(Russia) Yevgeny Kafelnikov	7–6^{(7–3)}, 6–1, 6–7^{(5–7)}, 6–4
Loss	2–5	Nov 2001	Sydney, Australia	Masters Cup Finals	Hard	(Australia) Lleyton Hewitt	3–6, 3–6, 4–6
Win	3–5	Oct 2002	St. Petersburg, Russia	World Series	Hard	(Russia) Mikhail Youzhny	7–5, 6–4
Loss	3–6	Jun 2003	Queen's, United Kingdom	World Series	Grass	(United States) Andy Roddick	3–6, 3–6
Loss	3–7	Oct 2003	Tokyo, Japan	Championship Series	Hard	(Germany) Rainer Schüttler	6–7^{(5–7)}, 2–6
Loss	3–8	Jun 2004	Queen's, United Kingdom	International Series	Grass	(United States) Andy Roddick	6–7^{(4–7)}, 4–6
Loss	3–9	Apr 2005	Houston, United States	International Series	Clay	(United States) Andy Roddick	2–6, 2–6
Win	4–9	Oct 2007	Lyon, France	International Series	Carpet	(France) Marc Gicquel	7–6^{(7–5)}, 6–4

=== Doubles: 7 (5 titles, 2 runner-ups) ===
Legend Grand Slam Tournaments (0–0) ATP World Tour Finals (0–0) ATP Masters Series (1–0) ATP Championship Series (0–0) ATP World Series (4–2)	Finals by surface Hard (3–1) Clay (1–0) Grass (0–0) Carpet (1–1)	Finals by setting Outdoors (3–0) Indoors (2–2)

Result	W–L	Date	Tournament	Tier	Surface	Partner	Opponents	Score
Win	1–0	Apr 2000	Casablanca, Morocco	World Series	Clay	(France) Arnaud Clément	(Germany) Lars Burgsmüller (Australia) Andrew Painter	7–6^{(7–4)}, 6–4
Loss	1–1	Oct 2001	Lyon, France	World Series	Carpet	(France) Arnaud Clément	(Canada) Daniel Nestor (Serbia and Montenegro) Nenad Zimonjić	1–6, 2–6
Win	2–1	Jul 2002	Los Angeles, United States	World Series	Hard	(Germany) Nicolas Kiefer	(United States) Justin Gimelstob (France) Michaël Llodra	6–4, 6–4
Win	3–1	Feb 2003	Marseille, France	World Series	Hard	(France) Fabrice Santoro	(Czech Republic) Tomáš Cibulec (Czech Republic) Pavel Vízner	6–1, 6–4
Win	4–1	Mar 2004	Indian Wells, United States	Masters Series	Hard	(France) Arnaud Clément	(Zimbabwe) Wayne Black (Zimbabwe) Kevin Ullyett	6–3, 4–6, 7–5
Win	5–1	Oct 2007	Lyon, France	World Series	Carpet	(France) Jo-Wilfried Tsonga	(Poland) Łukasz Kubot (Croatia) Lovro Zovko	6–4, 6–3
Loss	5–2	Oct 2009	Lyon, France	250 Series	Hard	(France) Arnaud Clément	(France) Julien Benneteau (France) Nicolas Mahut	4–6, 6–7^{(6–8)}

== ATP Challenger and ITF Futures finals ==
=== Singles: 5 (2–3) ===
Legend ATP Challenger (2–3) ITF Futures (0–0)	Finals by surface Hard (1–2) Clay (1–1) Grass (0–0) Carpet (0–0)

Result	W–L	Date	Tournament	Tier	Surface	Opponent	Score
Win	1–0	May 1997	Bratislava, Slovakia	Challenger	Clay	(Czech Republic) Radomír Vašek	6–4, 6–1
Loss	1–1	Jul 1997	Newcastle, United Kingdom	Challenger	Clay	(France) Fabrice Santoro	6–2, 3–6, 3–6
Loss	1–2	Oct 1997	Brest, France	Challenger	Hard	(Belgium) Johan Van Herck	6–4, 2–6, 4–6
Win	2–2	Feb 1999	Cherbourg, France	Challenger	Hard	(France) Antony Dupuis	4–6, 6–3, 6–0
Loss	2–3	Mar 2008	Sunrise, United States	Challenger	Hard	(Netherlands) Robin Haase	7–5, 5–7, 1–6

=== Doubles: 2 (0–2) ===
Legend ATP Challenger (0–2) ITF Futures (0–0)	Finals by surface Hard (0–2) Clay (0–0) Grass (0–0) Carpet (0–0)

Result	W–L	Date	Tournament	Tier	Surface	Partner	Opponents	Score
Loss	0–1	Oct 2009	Orléans, France	Challenger	Hard	(France) Olivier Patience	(United Kingdom) Colin Fleming (United Kingdom) Ken Skupski	1–6, 1–6
Loss	0–2	Oct 2010	Orléans, France	Challenger	Hard	(France) Nicolas Mahut	(France) Pierre-Hugues Herbert (France) Nicolas Renavand	6–7^{(3–7)}, 6–1, [6–10]

== Junior Grand Slam finals ==
=== Doubles: 1 (1 title) ===
Result	Year	Tournament	Surface	Partner	Opponents	Score
Win	1996	French Open	Clay	(France) Olivier Mutis	(Germany) Jan-Ralph Brandt (Germany) Daniel Elsner	6–2, 6–3

== Performance timelines ==
Key
W	F	SF	QF	#R	RR	Q#	P#	DNQ	A	Z#	PO	G	S	B	NMS	NTI	P	NH

(W) winner; (F) finalist; (SF) semifinalist; (QF) quarterfinalist; (#R) rounds 4, 3, 2, 1; (RR) round-robin stage; (Q#) qualification round; (P#) preliminary round; (DNQ) did not qualify; (A) absent; (Z#) Davis/Fed Cup Zonal Group (with number indication) or (PO) play-off; (G) gold, (S) silver or (B) bronze Olympic/Paralympic medal; (NMS) not a Masters tournament; (NTI) not a Tier I tournament; (P) postponed; (NH) not held; (SR) strike rate (events won / competed); (W–L) win–loss record.

=== Singles ===
Tournament	1997	1998	1999	2000	2001	2002	2003	2004	2005	2006	2007	2008	2009	2010	SR	W–L	Win%
Grand Slam tournaments
Australian Open	A	Q2	1R	3R	SF	2R	QF	QF	2R	QF	3R	3R	A	1R	0 / 11	25–11	69%
French Open	1R	1R	3R	3R	SF	QF	2R	2R	4R	2R	1R	A	A	A	0 / 11	19–11	63%
Wimbledon	Q3	4R	3R	1R	3R	A	SF	SF	QF	3R	2R	2R	A	A	0 / 10	25–10	71%
US Open	Q1	1R	1R	3R	1R	2R	1R	2R	3R	2R	3R	1R	A	A	0 / 11	9–11	45%
Win–loss	0–1	3–3	4–4	6–4	12–4	6–3	10–4	11–4	10–4	8–4	5–4	3–3	0–0	0–1	0 / 43	78–43	64%
National Representation
Summer Olympics	Not Held			A	Not Held			QF	Not Held			A	NH		0 / 1	3–1	75%
Year-End Championships
Tennis Masters Cup	Did not qualify				F	Did not qualify									0 / 1	3–2	60%
ATP Tour Masters 1000
Indian Wells	A	A	A	3R	3R	1R	3R	4R	2R	4R	1R	1R	A	Q1	0 / 9	10–9	53%
Miami	A	A	F	3R	3R	3R	2R	4R	3R	3R	2R	2R	A	A	0 / 10	15–10	60%
Monte Carlo	Q1	2R	3R	1R	SF	SF	A	2R	A	2R	A	1R	A	A	0 / 8	13–8	62%
Rome	A	A	1R	1R	3R	3R	1R	2R	2R	1R	A	A	A	A	0 / 8	6–8	43%
Hamburg	A	A	A	2R	3R	2R	2R	1R	3R	3R	Q2	A	NMS		0 / 7	9–7	56%
Canada	A	A	2R	3R	A	QF	3R	1R	3R	2R	1R	A	A	A	0 / 8	11–8	58%
Cincinnati	A	1R	1R	2R	A	1R	1R	1R	1R	1R	Q2	A	A	A	0 / 8	1–8	11%
Madrid (Note: Stuttgart from 1996 to 2001, and Madrid from 2002 onwards.)	A	A	2R	SF	3R	SF	QF	A	2R	2R	A	A	A	A	0 / 7	13–7	64%
Paris	A	1R	1R	3R	W	3R	2R	A	1R	2R	1R	A	1R	A	1 / 10	8–9	47%
Win–loss	0–0	1–3	9–6	8–8	16–5	15–9	7–8	6–7	7–8	9–9	1–4	1–3	0–1	0–0	1 / 72	80–71	53%
Year-end ranking	197	88	27	19	6	17	10	15	25	28	53	170	677	722			

=== Doubles ===
Tournament	1996	1997	1998	1999	2000	2001	2002	2003	2004	2005	2006	2007	2008	2009	SR	W–L	Win%
Grand Slam tournaments
Australian Open	A	A	A	A	A	3R	A	A	A	A	1R	1R	2R	A	0 / 4	3–4	43%
French Open	1R	1R	1R	1R	1R	A	A	A	A	A	A	1R	1R	1R	0 / 8	0–8	–
Wimbledon	A	A	A	A	A	A	A	A	A	A	A	A	A	A	0 / 0	0–0	–
US Open	A	A	A	A	A	A	2R	A	1R	1R	1R	1R	3R	A	0 / 6	3–6	33%
Win–loss	0–1	0–1	0–1	0–1	0–1	2–1	1–1	0–0	0–1	0–1	0–2	0–3	3–3	0–1	0 / 18	6–18	25%
National Representation
Summer Olympics	A	Not Held			A	Not Held			1R	Not Held			A	NH	0 / 1	0–1	0%
ATP Tour Masters 1000
Indian Wells	A	A	A	A	2R	Q1	2R	A	W	2R	QF	A	1R	A	1 / 6	10–5	67%
Miami	A	A	A	A	A	1R	2R	A	QF	A	2R	A	A	A	0 / 4	4–4	50%
Monte Carlo	A	A	A	A	2R	2R	A	A	1R	A	A	A	A	A	0 / 3	2–3	40%
Rome	A	A	A	A	1R	2R	1R	2R	A	A	2R	A	A	A	0 / 5	3–5	38%
Hamburg	A	A	A	A	Q1	A	A	1R	1R	A	A	A	A	NMS	0 / 2	0–2	0%
Canada	A	A	A	1R	1R	A	1R	A	QF	1R	A	A	A	A	0 / 5	2–5	29%
Cincinnati	A	A	A	Q2	A	A	2R	A	1R	A	A	A	A	A	0 / 2	1–2	33%
Madrid	A	A	A	A	A	A	1R	A	A	A	A	A	A	A	0 / 1	0–1	0%
Paris	A	A	1R	1R	A	A	A	A	A	1R	2R	2R	A	1R	0 / 6	2–6	25%
Win–loss	0–0	0–0	0–1	0–2	2–4	2–3	3–6	1–2	9–5	1–3	5–4	1–1	0–1	0–1	1 / 34	24–33	42%

== Top 10 wins ==
Season	1996	1997	1998	1999	2000	2001	2002	2003	2004	2005	2006	2007	2008	2009	2010	Total
Wins	0	0	0	2	3	7	0	2	0	1	1	0	0	0	0	16

#	Player	Rank	Event	Surface	Rd	Score	GR
1999
1.	(Spain) Carlos Moyá	1	Miami, United States	Hard	4R	3–6, 6–4, 7–6^{(11–9)}	74
2.	(Brazil) Gustavo Kuerten	6	Indianapolis, United States	Hard	QF	6–4, 6–3	32
2000
3.	(United Kingdom) Tim Henman	9	Indian Wells, United States	Hard	2R	6–3, 3–6, 7–5	19
4.	(Australia) Lleyton Hewitt	10	Toronto, Canada	Hard	2R	6–3, 7–6^{(7–5)}	27
5.	(Brazil) Gustavo Kuerten	3	Stuttgart, Germany	Hard (i)	3R	7–6^{(11–9)}, 6–3	32
2001
6.	(Sweden) Magnus Norman	4	Australian Open, Melbourne	Hard	4R	7–6^{(9–7)}, 6–3, 0–6, 6–4	19
7.	(Russia) Marat Safin	2	World Team Cup, Düsseldorf	Clay	RR	7–6^{(8–6)}, 6–3	10
8.	(United States) Andre Agassi	3	French Open, Paris	Clay	QF	1–6, 6–1, 6–1, 6–3	10
9.	(Russia) Yevgeny Kafelnikov	6	Paris Masters, France	Carpet (i)	F	7–6^{(7–3)}, 6–1, 6–7^{(5–7)}, 6–4	8
10.	(Australia) Pat Rafter	5	Tennis Masters Cup, Sydney	Hard (i)	RR	7–6^{(7–4)}, 6–3	7
11.	(United States) Andre Agassi	3	Tennis Masters Cup, Sydney	Hard (i)	RR	6–3, 6–4	7
12.	(Russia) Yevgeny Kafelnikov	6	Tennis Masters Cup, Sydney	Hard (i)	SF	6–4, 6–2	7
2003
13.	(Australia) Lleyton Hewitt	1	Queen's Club, United Kingdom	Grass	QF	6–3, 6–4	20
14.	(Spain) Juan Carlos Ferrero	3	Wimbledon, United Kingdom	Grass	4R	6–2, 4–6, 7–6^{(7–2)}, 7–6^{(7–3)}	14
2005
15.	(United States) Andre Agassi	10	Houston, United States	Clay	QF	4–6, 6–1, 6–2	30
2006
16.	(Argentina) Guillermo Coria	9	Australian Open, Melbourne	Hard	3R	6–2, 6–2, 3–6, 6–4	28
