= 2018 Davis Cup Africa Zone Group III =

International tennis competition

The Africa Zone was the unique zone within Group 3 of the regional Davis Cup competition in 2018. The zone's competition was held in round robin format in Nairobi, Kenya, from 18 to 23 June 2018. The two winning nations won promotion to Group II, Europe/Africa Zone, for 2019.

== Participating nations ==
- Algeria
- Benin
- Cameroon
- Kenya
- Mozambique
- Namibia
- Nigeria
- Rwanda
- Uganda

=== Inactive nations ===
- Angola
- Botswana
- Burkina Faso
- Congo
- Ivory Coast
- Djibouti
- Ethiopia
- Gabon
- Ghana
- Lesotho
- Libya
- Madagascar
- Mali
- Mauritius
- Senegal
- Sudan
- Togo
- Zambia

== Draw ==
Date: 18–23 June

Location: Nairobi Club Ground, Nairobi, Kenya (clay)

Format: Round-robin basis. One pool of four teams (Pool A) and one pool of five teams (Pool B). The winners of each pool play-off against each other to determine which two nations are promoted to Europe/Africa Zone Group II in 2019.

=== Seeding ===
Pot	Nation	Rank^{1}	Seed
1	Benin	79	1
1	Kenya	86	2
2	Algeria	88	3
2	Nigeria	102	4
3	Namibia	106	5
3	Rwanda	120	6
4	Mozambique	122	7
4	Cameroon	127	8
4	Uganda	NR	9

- ^{1}Davis Cup Rankings as of 9 April 2018

=== Pool A ===
		BEN	NGR	CMR	RWA	RR; W–L	Set; W–L	Game; W–L	Standings
1	Benin		3–0	2–1	3–0	3–0	16–2 (89%)	110–58 (65%)	1
4	Nigeria	0–3		2–1	3–0	2–1	10–9 (53%)	85–82 (51%)	2
8	Cameroon	1–2	1–2		2–1	1–2	10–10 (50%)	99–89 (53%)	3
6	Rwanda	0–3	0–3	1–2		0–3	2–17 (11%)	44–109 (29%)	4

=== Pool B ===
		NAM	KEN	MOZ	ALG	UGA	RR; W–L	Set; W–L	Game; W–L	Standings
5	Namibia		2–1	3–0	3–0	2–1	4–0	21–5 (81%)	151–94 (62%)	1
2	Kenya	1–2		3–0	3–0	3–0	3–1	21–4 (84%)	149–86 (63%)	2
7	Mozambique	0–3	0–3		2–1	2–1	2–2	8–19 (30%)	97–141 (41%)	3
3	Algeria	0–3	0–3	1–2		2–1	1–3	8–19 (30%)	105–145 (42%)	4
9	Uganda	1–2	0–3	1–2	1–2		0–4	9–20 (31%)	114–150 (43%)	5

Standings are determined by: 1. number of wins; 2. number of matches; 3. in two-team ties, head-to-head records; 4. in three-team ties, (a) percentage of sets won (head-to-head records if two teams remain tied), then (b) percentage of games won (head-to-head records if two teams remain tied), then (c) Davis Cup rankings.

=== Playoffs ===
Placing	A Team	Score	B Team
Promotional	Benin	1–2	Kenya
Promotional	Nigeria	1–2	Namibia
5th–6th	Cameroon	1–2	Mozambique
7th–8th	Rwanda	0–2	Algeria
9th	—N/a		Uganda

- Kenya and Namibia promoted to Group II in 2019.

== Round robin ==
=== Pool A ===
==== Benin vs. Cameroon ====
Benin
2
Nairobi Club Ground, Nairobi, Kenya
19 June
Clay

Cameroon
1

			1	2	3
1	(Benin) (Cameroon)	Félix Hounkpèvi; Étienne Teboh	6; 4	6; 1
2	(Benin) (Cameroon)	Alexis Klégou; Blaise Nkwenti	6; 3	7^{7} 6^{4}
3	(Benin) (Cameroon)	Félix Hounkpèvi / Magloire Yakpa; Dieu ne Dort Midzie / Cédric Wouobong Ngoumtsa	6^{6} 7^{8}	6^{2} 7^{7}

==== Nigeria vs. Rwanda ====
Nigeria
3
Nairobi Club Ground, Nairobi, Kenya
19 June
Clay

Rwanda
0

			1	2	3
1	(Nigeria) (Rwanda)	Sylvester Emmanuel; Ernest Habiyambere	6; 1	7; 5
2	(Nigeria) (Rwanda)	Joseph Imeh Ubon; Olivier Havugimana	6; 0	6; 1
3	(Nigeria) (Rwanda)	Christian Paul / Joseph Imeh Ubon; Hamissi Gatete / Etienne Niyigena	6; 1	6; 2

==== Benin vs. Rwanda ====
Benin
3
Nairobi Club Ground, Nairobi, Kenya
21 June
Clay

Rwanda
0

			1	2	3
1	(Benin) (Rwanda)	Delmas N'tcha; Etienne Niyigena	7; 5	6; 3
2	(Benin) (Rwanda)	Alexis Klégou; Ernest Habiyambere	6; 2	6; 2
3	(Benin) (Rwanda)	Félix Hounkpèvi / Alexis Klégou; Hamissi Gatete / Olivier Havugimana	6; 0	6; 2

==== Nigeria vs. Cameroon ====
Nigeria
2
Nairobi Club Ground, Nairobi, Kenya
21 June
Clay

Cameroon
1

			1	2	3
1	(Nigeria) (Cameroon)	Sylvester Emmanuel; Étienne Teboh	6; 4	6; 4
2	(Nigeria) (Cameroon)	Joseph Imeh Ubon; Blaise Nkwenti	2; 6	1; 6
3	(Nigeria) (Cameroon)	Sylvester Emmanuel / Joseph Imeh Ubon; Blaise Nkwenti / Cédric Wouobong Ngoumtsa	4; 6	7^{9} 6^{7}	6; 4

==== Benin vs. Nigeria ====
Benin
3
Nairobi Club Ground, Nairobi, Kenya
22 June
Clay

Nigeria
0

			1	2	3
1	(Benin) (Nigeria)	Delmas N'tcha; Sylvester Emmanuel	6; 4	6; 3
2	(Benin) (Nigeria)	Alexis Klégou; Christian Paul	6; 2	6; 1
3	(Benin) (Nigeria)	Félix Hounkpèvi / Alexis Klégou; Abdul-Mumin Babalola / Joseph Imeh Ubon	6; 3	6; 3

==== Rwanda vs. Cameroon ====
Rwanda
1
Nairobi Club Ground, Nairobi, Kenya
22 June
Clay

Cameroon
2

			1	2	3
1	(Rwanda) (Cameroon)	Ernest Habiyambere; Cédric Wouobong Ngoumtsa	6; 3	2; 6	6; 2
2	(Rwanda) (Cameroon)	Olivier Havugimana; Blaise Nkwenti	1; 6	2; 6
3	(Rwanda) (Cameroon)	Hamissi Gatete / Etienne Niyigena; Blaise Nkwenti / Cédric Wouobong Ngoumtsa	3; 6	0; 6

=== Pool B ===
==== Kenya vs. Uganda ====
Kenya
3
Nairobi Club Ground, Nairobi, Kenya
18 June
Clay

Uganda
0

			1	2	3
1	(Kenya) (Uganda)	Sheil Kotecha; David Oringa	6; 4	7^{7} 6^{4}
2	(Kenya) (Uganda)	Ismael Changawa Ruwa Mzai; Boris Aguma	6; 2	6; 1
3	(Kenya) (Uganda)	Kevin Cheruiyot / Ibrahim Kibet Yego; Simon Peter Ayella / Frank Tayebwa	6; 2	6; 3

==== Algeria vs. Namibia ====
Algeria
0
Nairobi Club Ground, Nairobi, Kenya
18 June
Clay

Namibia
3

			1	2	3
1	(Algeria) (Namibia)	Nazim Makhlouf; Jean Erasmus	0; 6	2; 6
2	(Algeria) (Namibia)	Youcef Rihane; Tukhula Jacobs	3; 6	4; 6
3	(Algeria) (Namibia)	Youcef Ghezal / Mohamed Hassan; Jean Erasmus / Tukhula Jacobs	1; 6	4; 6

==== Kenya vs. Mozambique ====
Kenya
3
Nairobi Club Ground, Nairobi, Kenya
19 June
Clay

Mozambique
0

			1	2	3
1	(Kenya) (Mozambique)	Ibrahim Kibet Yego; Bruno Nhavene	6; 2	6; 2
2	(Kenya) (Mozambique)	Isamel Changawa Ruwa Mzai; Franco Mata	6; 1	6; 4
3	(Kenya) (Mozambique)	Kevin Cheruiyot / Sheil Kotecha; Jonas Alberto Júnior / Hercílio Rafael Seda	6; 0	6; 1

==== Namibia vs. Uganda ====
Namibia
2
Nairobi Club Ground, Nairobi, Kenya
19 June
Clay

Uganda
1

			1	2	3
1	(Namibia) (Uganda)	Jean Erasmus; David Oringa	6; 4	6; 0
2	(Namibia) (Uganda)	Tukhula Jacobs; Boris Aguma	6; 1	6; 1
3	(Namibia) (Uganda)	Jean Erasmus / Gideon van Dyk; Simon Peter Ayella / David Oringa	6; 2	3; 6	4; 6

==== Algeria vs. Uganda ====
Algeria
2
Nairobi Club Ground, Nairobi, Kenya
20 June
Clay

Uganda
1

			1	2	3
1	(Algeria) (Uganda)	Nazim Makhlouf; David Oringa	6; 4	6; 1
2	(Algeria) (Uganda)	Mohamed Hassan; Boris Aguma	7; 5	3; 6	6; 3
3	(Algeria) (Uganda)	Youcef Ghezal / Nazim Makhlouf; Simon Peter Ayella / David Oringa	7^{7} 6^{4}	6^{4} 7^{7}	3; 6

==== Namibia vs. Mozambique ====
Namibia
3
Nairobi Club Ground, Nairobi, Kenya
20 June
Clay

Mozambique
0

			1	2	3
1	(Namibia) (Mozambique)	Jean Erasmus; Bruno Nhavene	6; 4	6; 3
2	(Namibia) (Mozambique)	Tukhula Jacobs; Franco Mata	6; 3	6; 1
3	(Namibia) (Mozambique)	Jean Erasmus / Tukhula Jacobs; Franco Mata / Bruno Nhavene	7^{8} 6^{6}	6; 4

==== Kenya vs. Namibia ====
Kenya
1
Nairobi Club Ground, Nairobi, Kenya
21 June
Clay

Namibia
2

			1	2	3
1	(Kenya) (Namibia)	Sheil Kotecha; Jean Erasmus	7; 5	6; 3
2	(Kenya) (Namibia)	Ismael Changawa Ruwa Mzai; Tukhula Jacobs	6^{2} 7^{7}	3; 6
3	(Kenya) (Namibia)	Ismael Changawa Ruwa Mzai / Ibrahim Kibet Yego; Jean Erasmus / Tukhula Jacobs	5; 7	7^{10} 6^{8}	5; 7

==== Algeria vs. Mozambique ====
Algeria
1
Nairobi Club Ground, Nairobi, Kenya
21 June
Clay

Mozambique
2

			1	2	3
1	(Algeria) (Mozambique)	Nazim Makhlouf; Bruno Nhavene	6; 0	7^{7} 6^{4}
2	(Algeria) (Mozambique)	Mohamed Hassan; Franco Mata	6; 4	3; 6	2; 6
3	(Algeria) (Mozambique)	Youcef Ghezal / Nazim Makhlouf; Franco Mata / Bruno Nhavene	4; 6	2; 6

==== Kenya vs. Algeria ====
Kenya
3
Nairobi Club Ground, Nairobi, Kenya
22 June
Clay

Algeria
0

			1	2	3
1	(Kenya) (Algeria)	Sheil Kotecha; Nazim Makhlouf	6; 4	6; 3
2	(Kenya) (Algeria)	Ismael Changawa Ruwa Mzai; Mohamed Hassan	6; 3	6; 0
3	(Kenya) (Algeria)	Kevin Cheruiyot / Ibrahim Kibet Yego; Youcef Ghezal / Mohamed Hassan	6; 2	7; 5

==== Mozambique vs. Uganda ====
Mozambique
2
Nairobi Club Ground, Nairobi, Kenya
22 June
Clay

Uganda
1

			1	2	3
1	(Mozambique) (Uganda)	Bruno Nhavene; David Oringa	1; 6	6; 3	7^{7} 6^{3}
2	(Mozambique) (Uganda)	Franco Mata; Boris Aguma	6; 2	6^{5} 7^{7}	6; 2
3	(Mozambique) (Uganda)	Jonas Alberto Júnior / Hercílio Rafael Seda; Boris Aguma / Simon Peter Ayella	0; 6	0; 6

== Playoffs ==
=== Promotional playoffs ===
==== Benin vs. Kenya ====
Benin
1
Nairobi Club Ground, Nairobi, Kenya
23 June
Clay

Kenya
2

			1	2	3
1	(Benin) (Kenya)	Delmas N'tcha; Sheil Kotecha	4; 6	4; 6
2	(Benin) (Kenya)	Alexis Klégou; Ismael Changawa Ruwa Mzai	7^{7} 6^{2}	6; 4
3	(Benin) (Kenya)	Félix Hounkpèvi / Alexis Klégou; Ismael Changawa Ruwa Mzai / Ibrahim Kibet Yego	3; 6	6; 3	4; 6

==== Namibia vs. Nigeria ====
Namibia
2
Nairobi Club Ground, Nairobi, Kenya
23 June
Clay

Nigeria
1

			1	2	3
1	(Namibia) (Nigeria)	Jean Erasmus; Sylvester Emmanuel	1; 6	2; 6
2	(Namibia) (Nigeria)	Tukhula Jacobs; Christian Paul	6; 1	3; 2		retired
3	(Namibia) (Nigeria)	Jean Erasmus / Tukhula Jacobs; Sylvester Emmanuel / Joseph Imeh Ubon	7^{7} 6^{1}	6; 4

=== 5th to 6th playoffs ===
==== Cameroon vs. Mozambique ====
Cameroon
1
Nairobi Club Ground, Nairobi, Kenya
23 June
Clay

Mozambique
2

			1	2	3
1	(Cameroon) (Mozambique)	Dieu ne Dort Midzie; Bruno Nhavene	6; 0	4; 6	2; 6
2	(Cameroon) (Mozambique)	Blaise Nkwenti; Franco Mata	6; 4	6; 4
3	(Cameroon) (Mozambique)	Blaise Nkwenti / Cédric Wouobong Ngoumtsa; Franco Mata / Bruno Nhavene	4; 6	6^{4} 7^{7}

=== 7th to 8th playoffs ===
==== Rwanda vs. Algeria ====
Rwanda
0
Nairobi Club Ground, Nairobi, Kenya
23 June
Clay

Algeria
2

			1	2	3
1	(Rwanda) (Algeria)	Ernest Habiyambere; Nazim Makhlouf	2; 6	0; 6
2	(Rwanda) (Algeria)	Olivier Havugimana; Mohamed Hassan	2; 6	3; 6
3	(Rwanda) (Algeria)	Hamissi Gatete / Etienne Niyigena; Youcef Ghezal / Youcef Rihane				not played
