= Jean Erasmus =

Namibian tennis player

- Country (sports): Namibia
- Residence: Windhoek, Namibia
- Born: 17 May 1991 (age 34) Johannesburg, South Africa
- Plays: Right-handed (two-handed backhand)
- College: Drake
- Prize money: $735

Singles
- Career record: 0–0 (at ATP Tour level, Grand Slam level)
- Career titles: 0; 0 Challenger, 0 Futures
- Highest ranking: No. 1,591 (30 July 2018)

Doubles
- Career record: 0–0 (at ATP Tour level, Grand Slam level)
- Career titles: 0; 0 Challenger, 0 Futures
- Highest ranking: No. 1,124 (4 July 2011)

Team competitions
- Davis Cup: 24–23
- Last updated on: 14 September 2024.

Jean Erasmus (born 17 May 1991) is a South African born Namibian tennis player.

Erasmus has a career high ATP singles ranking 1591, achieved on 30 July 2018, he also has a career high doubles ranking of 1124, achieved on 4 July 2011. Erasmus has played 1 ITF doubles final.

Erasmus has represented Namibia at Davis Cup, where he has a win–loss record of 24–23.

He played tennis at Drake University between from 2009 to 2013.

== Future and Challenger finals ==
=== Doubles 1 (0–1) ===
Legend
Challengers 0 (0–0)
Futures 1 (0–1)

| Outcome | No. | Date | Tournament | Surface | Partner | Opponents | Score |
|---|---|---|---|---|---|---|---|
| Runner-up | 1. | 28 May 2011 | Durban, South Africa F2 | Hard | (United States) Edward Louies Oueilhe | (Austria) Nikolaus Moser (Austria) Richard Ruckelshausen | 2–6, 5–7 |

== Davis Cup ==
=== Participations: (24–23) ===
| Group membership World Group (0–0) WG Play-off (0–0) Group I (0–0) Group II (0–0) Group III (22–21) Group IV (2–2) | Matches by surface Hard (3–1) Clay (21–22) Grass (0–0) Carpet (0–0) | Matches by type Singles (10–16) Doubles (14–7) |

- ▲ ▼ indicates the outcome of the Davis Cup match followed by the score, date, place of event, the zonal classification and its phase, and the court surface.

| Rubber outcome | No. | Rubber | Match type (partner if any) | Opponent nation | Opponent player(s) | Score |
▼0–3; 30 April 2008; Master Class Tennis and Fitness Club, Yerevan, Armenia; Europe/Africa Zone Group IV Round Robin; Clay surface
| Defeat | 1 | I | Singles | Iceland | Raj-Kumar Bonifacius | 6–2, 3–6, 2–6 |
▲3–0; 1 May 2008; Master Class Tennis and Fitness Club, Yerevan, Armenia; Europe/Africa Zone Group IV Round Robin; Clay surface
| Victory | 2 | I | Singles | Rwanda | Olivier Nkunda | 6–1, 6–2 |
▲2–1; 2 May 2008; Master Class Tennis and Fitness Club, Yerevan, Armenia; Europe/Africa Zone Group IV Round Robin; Clay surface
| Victory | 3 | I | Singles | San Marino | Domenico Vicini | 6–0, 6–2 |
| Defeat | 4 | III | Doubles (with Jacobus Serdyn) | San Marino | William Forcellini / Domenico Vicini | 2–6, 4–6 |
▼0–3; 1 April 2009; Avenir Sportif de la Marsa, La Marsa, Tunisia; Europe/Africa Zone Group III Round Robin; Clay surface
| Defeat | 5 | I | Singles | Bosnia and Herzegovina | Ismar Gorčić | 1–6, 1–6 |
| Defeat | 6 | III | Doubles (with Jurgens Strydom) | Bosnia and Herzegovina | Mirza Bašić / Tomislav Brkić | 2–6, 3–6 |
▼0–3; 2 April 2009; Avenir Sportif de la Marsa, La Marsa, Tunisia; Europe/Africa Zone Group III Round Robin; Clay surface
| Defeat | 7 | I | Singles | Norway | Erling Tveit | 2–6, 0–6 |
| Defeat | 8 | III | Doubles (with Warren Frewer) | Norway | Stian Boretti / Erling Tveit | 1–6, 1–6 |
▼1–2; 3 April 2009; Avenir Sportif de la Marsa, La Marsa, Tunisia; Europe/Africa Zone Group III Round Robin; Clay surface
| Defeat | 9 | I | Singles | Andorra | Jordi Vila-Vila | 1–6, 6–4, 6–7^{(5–7)} |
| Victory | 10 | III | Doubles (with Jurgens Strydom) | Andorra | Pau Gerbaud-Farras / Hector Hormigo-Herrera | 6–3, 6–3 |
▲2–1; 4 April 2009; Avenir Sportif de la Marsa, La Marsa, Tunisia; Europe/Africa Zone Group III Relegation Play off; Clay surface
| Defeat | 11 | I | Singles | San Marino | Domenico Vicini | 2–6, 4–6 |
| Victory | 12 | III | Doubles (with Jurgens Strydom) | San Marino | Domenico Vicini / Giacomo Zonzini | 6–7^{(2–7)}, 6–0, 6–3 |
▼1–2; 5 April 2009; Avenir Sportif de la Marsa, La Marsa, Tunisia; Europe/Africa Zone Group III Relegation Play off; Clay surface
| Defeat | 13 | I | Singles | Nigeria | Lawal Shehu | 2–6, 3–6 |
| Defeat | 14 | III | Doubles (with Jurgens Strydom) | Nigeria | Candy Idoko / Lawal Shehu | 1–6, 3–6 |
▲2–1; 2 July 2012; Cite Nationale Sportive d'El, Tunis, Tunisia; Africa Zone Group III Round Robin; Clay surface
| Defeat | 15 | II | Singles | Ghana | Henry Adjei-Darko | 1–6, 1–6 |
| Victory | 16 | III | Doubles (with Tukhula Jacobs) | Ghana | Henry Adjei-Darko / Raymond Hayford | 6–4, 6–1 |
▼0–3; 3 July 2012; Cite Nationale Sportive d'El, Tunis, Tunisia; Africa Zone Group III Round Robin; Clay surface
| Defeat | 17 | II | Singles | Tunisia | Malek Jaziri | 2–6, 4–6 |
▼0–3; 4 July 2012; Cite Nationale Sportive d'El, Tunis, Tunisia; Africa Zone Group III Round Robin; Clay surface
| Defeat | 18 | II | Singles | Zimbabwe | Mark Fynn | 6–7^{(5–7)}, 4–6 |
▲2–1; 6 July 2012; Cite Nationale Sportive d'El, Tunis, Tunisia; Africa Zone Group III 5th-6th Play off; Clay surface
| Victory | 19 | II | Singles | Kenya | Fazal Mohamed Khan | 7–6^{(7–5)}, 6–3 |
| Victory | 20 | III | Doubles (with Johan de Witt) | Kenya | Ismael Mzai / Ibrahim Yego | 6–2, 6–0 |
▲2–1; 11 July 2016; University of Antananarivo, Antananarivo, Madagascar; Africa Zone Group III Round Robin; Clay surface
| Defeat | 21 | I | Singles | Nigeria | Sylvester Emmanuel | 2–6, 3–6 |
| Victory | 22 | III | Doubles (with Tukhula Jacobs) | Nigeria | Abdul-Mumin Babalola / Lawal Shehu | 6–4, 7–5 |
▼0–3; 12 July 2016; University of Antananarivo, Antananarivo, Madagascar; Africa Zone Group III Round Robin; Clay surface
| Defeat | 23 | I | Singles | Morocco | Yassine Idmbarek | 1–6, 3–6 |
▲3–0; 13 July 2016; University of Antananarivo, Antananarivo, Madagascar; Africa Zone Group III Round Robin; Clay surface
| Victory | 24 | I | Singles | Cameroon | Blaise Nkwenti | 5–7, 6–3, 6–4 |
| Victory | 25 | III | Doubles (with Tukhula Jacobs) | Cameroon | Augustin Ntouba / Étienne Teboh | 6–3, 6–2 |
▲3–0; 14 July 2016; University of Antananarivo, Antananarivo, Madagascar; Africa Zone Group III Round Robin; Clay surface
| Victory | 26 | I | Singles | Mozambique | Jossefa Simao Elias | 6–1, 6–1 |
▼0–2; 16 July 2016; University of Antananarivo, Antananarivo, Madagascar; Africa Zone Group III Promotional Playoff; Clay surface
| Defeat | 27 | I | Singles | Madagascar | Jean-Jacques Rakotohasy | 1–6, 2–6 |
▲3–0; 18 June 2018; Nairobi Club, Nairobi, Kenya; Africa Zone Group III Round Robin; Clay surface
| Victory | 28 | I | Singles | Algeria | Nazim Makhlouf | 6–0, 6–2 |
| Victory | 29 | III | Doubles (with Tukhula Jacobs) | Algeria | Youcef Ghezal / Mohamed Hassan | 6–1, 6–4 |
▲2–1; 19 June 2018; Nairobi Club, Nairobi, Kenya; Africa Zone Group III Round Robin; Clay surface
| Victory | 30 | I | Singles | Uganda | David Oringa | 6–4, 6–0 |
| Defeat | 31 | III | Doubles (with Gideon Van Dyk) | Uganda | Simon Peter Ayella / David Oringa | 6–2, 3–6, 4–6 |
▲3–0; 20 June 2018; Nairobi Club, Nairobi, Kenya; Africa Zone Group III Round Robin; Clay surface
| Victory | 32 | I | Singles | Mozambique | Bruno Nhavene | 6–4, 6–3 |
| Victory | 33 | III | Doubles (with Tukhula Jacobs) | Mozambique | Franco Mata / Bruno Nhavene | 7–6^{(8–6)}, 6–4 |
▲2–1; 21 June 2018; Nairobi Club, Nairobi, Kenya; Africa Zone Group III Round Robin; Clay surface
| Defeat | 34 | I | Singles | Kenya | Sheil Kotecha | 5–7, 3–6 |
| Victory | 35 | III | Doubles (with Tukhula Jacobs) | Kenya | Ismael Mzai / Ibrahim Yego | 7–5, 6–7^{(8–10)}, 7–5 |
▲2–1; 23 June 2018; Nairobi Club, Nairobi, Kenya; Africa Zone Group III Promotional Playoff; Clay surface
| Defeat | 36 | I | Singles | Nigeria | Sylvester Emmanuel | 1–6, 2–6 |
| Victory | 37 | III | Doubles (with Tukhula Jacobs) | Nigeria | Sylvester Emmanuel / Joseph Imeh Ubon | 7–6^{(7–1)}, 6–4 |
▲2–1; 11 September 2019; Nairobi Club, Nairobi, Kenya; Africa Zone Group III Pool A Round robin; Clay surface
| Victory | 38 | II | Singles | Nigeria | Emmanuel Audu | 6–2, 6–4 |
| Victory | 39 | III | Doubles (with Codie Van Schalkwyk) | Nigeria | Paul Etim / Emmanuel Idoko | 6–4, 6–4 |
▼1–2; 12 September 2019; Nairobi Club, Nairobi, Kenya; Africa Zone Group III Pool A Round robin; Clay surface
| Victory | 40 | II | Singles | Mozambique | Franco Mata | 7–6^{(8–6)}, 6–3 |
| Defeat | 41 | III | Doubles (with Codie Van Schalkwyk) | Mozambique | Franco Mata / Bruno Nhavene | 4–6, 3–6 |
▼0–3; 13 September 2019; Nairobi Club, Nairobi, Kenya; Africa Zone Group III Pool A Round robin; Clay surface
| Defeat | 42 | II | Singles | Tunisia | Aziz Dougaz | 3–6, 6–7^{(5–7)} |
▼1–2; 13 September 2019; Nairobi Club, Nairobi, Kenya; Africa Zone Group III 7th-8th playoff; Clay surface
| Defeat | 43 | II | Singles | Benin | Alexis Klégou | 1–6, 2–6 |
▲3–0; 17 July 2024; National Tennis Centre, Abuja, Nigeria; Africa Zone Group III Round Robin; Hard surface
| Victory | 44 | III | Doubles (with Codie Van Schalkwyk) | Nigeria | Daniel Adeleye / Michael Emmanuel | 7–6^{(7–4)}, 6–3 |
▲3–0; 18 July 2024; National Tennis Centre, Abuja, Nigeria; Africa Zone Group III Round Robin; Hard surface
| Victory | 45 | III | Doubles (with Connor Van Schalkwyk) | Benin | Prince Gandonou / Sodick Noudogbessi | 2–6, 6–4, 6–1 |
▲3–0; 20 July 2024; National Tennis Centre, Abuja, Nigeria; Africa Zone Group III Round Robin; Hard surface
| Victory | 46 | III | Doubles (with Connor Van Schalkwyk) | Ivory Coast | Frederic Coulibaly / Francky Martial Hoimian | 6–1, 6–1 |
▼1–2; 20 July 2024; National Tennis Centre, Abuja, Nigeria; Africa Zone Group III Round Robin; Hard surface
| Defeat | 47 | III | Doubles (with Codie Van Schalkwyk) | Zimbabwe | Benjamin Lock / Courtney John Lock | 3–6, 7–5, 6–7^{(3–7)} |
