= 2017 Davis Cup Africa Zone Group III =

International tennis competition

The Africa Zone was the unique zone within Group 3 of the regional Davis Cup competition in 2017. The zone's competition was held in round robin format in Cairo, Egypt, from 17 July to 22 July 2017. The two winning nations won promotion to Group II, Europe/Africa Zone, for 2018.

== Participating nations ==
- Algeria
- Benin
- Botswana
- Egypt
- Kenya
- Libya
- Nigeria
- Rwanda
- Zimbabwe

=== Inactive nations ===
- Angola
- Burkina Faso
- Cameroon
- Congo
- Djibouti
- Ethiopia
- Gabon
- Ghana
- Ivory Coast
- Lesotho
- Mali
- Mauritius
- Mozambique
- Namibia
- Senegal
- Sudan
- Togo
- Uganda
- Zambia

== Draw ==
Date: 17–22 July

Location: Solaimaneyah Club, Cairo, Egypt (clay)

Format: Round-robin basis. Two pools of four and five teams, respectively (Pools A and B). The winner of each pool plays off against the runner-up of the other pool to determine which two nations are promoted to Asia/Oceania Zone Group II in 2018.

Seeding: The seeding was based on the Davis Cup Rankings of 10 April 2017 (shown in parentheses below).

Pot 1	Pot 2	Pot 3	Pot 4
1. Zimbabwe (73); 2. Algeria (81)	3. Benin (83); 4. Egypt (96)	5. Nigeria (98); 6. Kenya (117)	7. Botswana (119); 8. Rwanda (126); 9. Libya (129)

=== Pool A ===
		EGY	ZIM	NGR	RWA	RR; W–L	Set; W–L	Game; W–L	Standings
96	Egypt		3–0	3–0	3–0	3–0	18–1 (95%)	113–35 (76%)	1
73	Zimbabwe	0–3		2–1	3–0	2–1	10–9 (53%)	85–75 (53%)	2
98	Nigeria	0–3	1–2		3–0	1–2	10–10 (50%)	91–93 (49%)	3
126	Rwanda	0–3	0–3	0–3		0–3	0–18 (0%)	22–108 (17%)	4

Standings are determined by: 1. number of wins; 2. number of matches; 3. in two-team ties, head-to-head records; 4. in three-team ties, (a) percentage of sets won (head-to-head records if two teams remain tied), then (b) percentage of games won (head-to-head records if two teams remain tied), then (c) Davis Cup rankings.

=== Pool B ===
		KEN	BEN	ALG	LBA	BOT	RR; W–L	Set; W–L	Game; W–L	Standings
117	Kenya		2–1	2–1	2–1	3–0	4–0	20–7 (74%)	148–89 (62%)	1
83	Benin	1–2		2–1	3–0	3–0	3–1	19–8 (70%)	138–95 (59%)	2
81	Algeria	1–2	1–2		3–0	3–0	2–2	17–9 (65%)	134–86 (61%)	3
129	Libya	1–2	0–3	0–3		2–1	1–3	7–20 (26%)	83–151 (35%)	4
119	Botswana	0–3	0–3	0–3	1–2		0–4	4–23 (15%)	67–149 (31%)	5

Standings are determined by: 1. number of wins; 2. number of matches; 3. in two-team ties, head-to-head records; 4. in three-team ties, (a) percentage of sets won (head-to-head records if two teams remain tied), then (b) percentage of games won (head-to-head records if two teams remain tied), then (c) Davis Cup rankings.

=== Playoffs ===
Placing	A Team	Score	B Team
Promotional	Egypt	2–0	Benin
Promotional	Zimbabwe	2–0	Kenya
5th–6th	Nigeria	2–0	Algeria
7th–8th	Rwanda	2–1	Libya
9th	—N/a		Botswana

- Egypt and Zimbabwe promoted to Group II in 2018.

== Round robin ==
=== Pool A ===
==== Zimbabwe vs. Rwanda ====
Zimbabwe
3
Solaimaneyah Club, Cairo, Egypt
17 July 2017
Clay

Rwanda
0

			1	2	3
1	(Zimbabwe) (Rwanda)	Tadiwa Chinamo; Hamissi Gatete	6; 0	6; 0
2	(Zimbabwe) (Rwanda)	Benjamin Lock; Olivier Havugimana	6; 1	6; 1
3	(Zimbabwe) (Rwanda)	Benjamin Lock / Courtney John Lock; Olivier Havugimana / Fabrice Tuyishime	6; 2	6; 1

==== Egypt vs. Nigeria ====
Egypt
3
Solaimaneyah Club, Cairo, Egypt
17 July 2017
Clay

Nigeria
0

			1	2	3
1	(Egypt) (Nigeria)	Youssef Hossam; Joseph Imeh Ubon	6; 3	6; 1
2	(Egypt) (Nigeria)	Karim-Mohamed Maamoun; Sylvester Emmanuel	6; 0	6; 3
3	(Egypt) (Nigeria)	Youssef Hossam / Sherif Sabry; Abdul-Mumin Babalola / Clifford Enosoregbe	6; 4	5; 7	6; 3

==== Zimbabwe vs. Nigeria ====
Zimbabwe
2
Solaimaneyah Club, Cairo, Egypt
19 July 2017
Clay

Nigeria
1

			1	2	3
1	(Zimbabwe) (Nigeria)	Benjamin Lock; Joseph Imeh Ubon	6; 4	6; 2
2	(Zimbabwe) (Nigeria)	Takanyi Garanganga; Sylvester Emmanuel	3; 6	5; 7
3	(Zimbabwe) (Nigeria)	Benjamin Lock / Courtney John Lock; Abdul-Mumin Babalola / Sylvester Emmanuel	7^{7} 6^{4}	4; 6	6; 3

==== Egypt vs. Rwanda ====
Egypt
3
Solaimaneyah Club, Cairo, Egypt
19 July 2017
Clay

Rwanda
0

			1	2	3
1	(Egypt) (Rwanda)	Karim-Mohamed Maamoun; Etienne Niyigena	6; 0	6; 0
2	(Egypt) (Rwanda)	Mohamed Safwat; Olivier Havugimana	6; 0	6; 1
3	(Egypt) (Rwanda)	Youssef Hossam / Sherif Sabry; Hamissi Gatete / Fabrice Tuyishime	6; 1	6; 0

==== Zimbabwe vs. Egypt ====
Zimbabwe
0
Solaimaneyah Club, Cairo, Egypt
21 July 2017
Clay

Egypt
3

			1	2	3
1	(Zimbabwe) (Egypt)	Tadiwa Chinamo; Karim-Mohamed Maamoun	0; 6	1; 6
2	(Zimbabwe) (Egypt)	Benjamin Lock; Mohamed Safwat	2; 6	2; 6
3	(Zimbabwe) (Egypt)	Benjamin Lock / Courtney John Lock; Youssef Hossam / Sherif Sabry	4; 6	3; 6

==== Nigeria vs. Rwanda ====
Nigeria
3
Solaimaneyah Club, Cairo, Egypt
21 July 2017
Clay

Rwanda
0

			1	2	3
1	(Nigeria) (Rwanda)	Abdul-Mumin Babalola; Etienne Niyigena	6; 3	6; 4
2	(Nigeria) (Rwanda)	Clifford Enosoregbe; Olivier Havugimana	6; 2	6; 2
3	(Nigeria) (Rwanda)	Sylvester Emmanuel / Joseph Imeh Ubon; Etienne Niyigena / Fabrice Tuyishime	6; 1	6; 3

=== Pool B ===
==== Benin vs. Libya ====
Benin
3
Solaimaneyah Club, Cairo, Egypt
17 July 2017
Clay

Libya
0

			1	2	3
1	(Benin) (Libya)	Magloire Yakpa; Mohammed Ghshuot	7^{7} 6^{1}	6; 4
2	(Benin) (Libya)	Alexis Klégou; Ahmed Mouhan	6; 0	6; 1
3	(Benin) (Libya)	Félix Hounkpèvi / Delmas N'tcha; Mohammed Ghshuot / Ahmed Mouhan	6; 2	6; 0

==== Kenya vs. Botswana ====
Kenya
3
Solaimaneyah Club, Cairo, Egypt
17 July 2017
Clay

Botswana
0

			1	2	3
1	(Kenya) (Botswana)	Sheil Kotecha; Lefa Ashley Sibanda	6; 2	6; 2
2	(Kenya) (Botswana)	Ismael Changawa Ruwa Mzai; Innocent Tidimane	6; 0	6; 0
3	(Kenya) (Botswana)	Ibrahim Kibet / Ismael Changawa Ruwa Mzai; Aobakwe Lekang / Bayani Moilwa	6; 1	6; 1

==== Algeria vs. Kenya ====
Algeria
1
Solaimaneyah Club, Cairo, Egypt
18 July 2017
Clay

Kenya
2

			1	2	3
1	(Algeria) (Kenya)	Nazim Makhlouf; Sheil Kotecha	4; 6	7^{11} 6^{9}	6; 1
2	(Algeria) (Kenya)	Mohamed Hassan; Ismael Changawa Ruwa Mzai	0; 6	3; 6
3	(Algeria) (Kenya)	Mazim Makhlouf / Hichem Yasri; Ibrahim Kibet / Ismael Changawa Ruwa Mzai	4; 6	5; 7

==== Botswana vs. Libya ====
Botswana
1
Solaimaneyah Club, Cairo, Egypt
18 July 2017
Clay

Libya
2

			1	2	3
1	(Botswana) (Libya)	Lefa Ashley Sibanda; Mohammed Ghshuot	2; 6	6; 1	6; 2
2	(Botswana) (Libya)	Innocent Tidimane; Ahmed Mouhan	6^{2} 7^{7}	6; 3	4; 6
3	(Botswana) (Libya)	Aobakwe Lekang / Lefa Ashley Sibanda; Mohammed Ghshuot / Ahmed Mouhan	6^{2} 7^{7}	3; 6

==== Algeria vs. Botswana ====
Algeria
3
Solaimaneyah Club, Cairo, Egypt
19 July 2017
Clay

Botswana
0

			1	2	3
1	(Algeria) (Botswana)	Nazim Makhlouf; Aobakwe Lekang	6; 0	6; 0
2	(Algeria) (Botswana)	Mohamed Hassan; Lefa Ashley Sibanda	6; 4	6; 2
3	(Algeria) (Botswana)	Nazim Makhlouf / Hichem Yasri; Bayani Moilwa / Lefa Ashley Sibanda	6; 1	6; 1

==== Benin vs. Kenya ====
Benin
1
Solaimaneyah Club, Cairo, Egypt
19 July 2017
Clay

Kenya
2

			1	2	3
1	(Benin) (Kenya)	Félix Hounkpèvi; Sheil Kotecha	3; 6	1; 6
2	(Benin) (Kenya)	Alexis Klégou; Ismael Changawa Ruwa Mzai	6; 3	6; 2
3	(Benin) (Kenya)	Alexis Klégou / Delmas N'tcha; Ibrahim Kibet / Ismael Changawa Ruwa Mzai	3; 6	7; 5	6^{3} 7^{7}

==== Algeria vs. Libya ====
Algeria
3
Solaimaneyah Club, Cairo, Egypt
20 July 2017
Clay

Libya
0

			1	2	3
1	(Algeria) (Libya)	Youcef Ghezal; Mohammed Ghshuot	6; 0	6; 0
2	(Algeria) (Libya)	Mohamed Hassan; Ahmed Mouhan	6; 2	6; 3
3	(Algeria) (Libya)	Youcef Ghezal / Hichem Yasri; Mohammed Ghshuot / Ahmed Mouhan	6; 2	6; 3

==== Benin vs. Botswana ====
Benin
3
Solaimaneyah Club, Cairo, Egypt
20 July 2017
Clay

Botswana
0

			1	2	3
1	(Benin) (Botswana)	Félix Hounkpèvi; Aobakwe Lekang	3; 6	6; 3	6; 2
2	(Benin) (Botswana)	Alexis Klégou; Lefa Ashley Sibanda	6; 2	6; 0
3	(Benin) (Botswana)	Félix Hounkpèvi / Delmas N'tcha; Aobakwe Lekang / Bayani Moilwa	6; 1	6; 0

==== Algeria vs. Benin ====
Algeria
1
Solaimaneyah Club, Cairo, Egypt
21 July 2017
Clay

Benin
2

			1	2	3
1	(Algeria) (Benin)	Youcef Ghezal; Magloire Yakpa	6; 2	6; 0
2	(Algeria) (Benin)	Nazim Makhlouf; Alexis Klégou	1; 6	6; 2	4; 6
3	(Algeria) (Benin)	Mohamed Hassan / Hichem Yasri; Alexis Klégou / Magloire Yakpa	5; 7	5; 7

==== Kenya vs. Libya ====
Kenya
2
Solaimaneyah Club, Cairo, Egypt
21 July 2017
Clay

Libya
1

			1	2	3
1	(Kenya) (Libya)	Sheil Kotecha; Mohammed Ghshuot	6; 1	6; 2
2	(Kenya) (Libya)	Ismael Changawa Ruwa Mzai; Ahmed Mouhan	6; 2	6; 0
3	(Kenya) (Libya)	Ibrahim Kibet / Olivier Kigotho; Mohammed Ghshuot / Ahmed Mouhan	4; 6	7; 5	4; 6

== Playoffs ==
=== Promotional playoffs ===
==== Egypt vs. Benin ====
Egypt
2
Solaimaneyah Club, Cairo, Egypt
22 July 2017
Clay

Benin
0

			1	2	3
1	(Egypt) (Benin)	Karim-Mohamed Maamoun; Félix Hounkpèvi	6; 0	6; 1
2	(Egypt) (Benin)	Mohamed Safwat; Alexis Klégou	6; 2	6; 4
3	(Egypt) (Benin)	Youssef Hossam / Mohamed Safwat; Delmas N'tcha / Magloire Yakpa				not played

==== Zimbabwe vs. Kenya ====
Zimbabwe
2
Solaimaneyah Club, Cairo, Egypt
22 July 2017
Clay

Kenya
0

			1	2	3
1	(Zimbabwe) (Kenya)	Benjamin Lock; Sheil Kotecha	6; 1	6; 1
2	(Zimbabwe) (Kenya)	Takanyi Garanganga; Ismael Changawa Ruwa Mzai	6; 4	3; 6	7; 5
3	(Zimbabwe) (Kenya)	Benjamin Lock / Courtney John Lock; Ibrahim Kibet / Ismael Changawa Ruwa Mzai				not played

=== Fifth place playoff ===
==== Nigeria vs. Algeria ====
Nigeria
2
Solaimaneyah Club, Cairo, Egypt
22 July 2017
Clay

Algeria
0

			1	2	3
1	(Nigeria) (Algeria)	Joseph Imeh Ubon; Hichem Yasri	6; 3	6; 3
2	(Nigeria) (Algeria)	Sylvester Emmanuel; Youcef Ghezal	6; 3	6; 4
3	(Nigeria) (Algeria)	Abdul-Mumin Babalola / Clifford Enosoregbe; Youcef Ghezal / Hichem Yasri				not played

=== Seventh place playoff ===
==== Rwanda vs. Libya ====
Rwanda
2
Solaimaneyah Club, Cairo, Egypt
22 July 2017
Clay

Libya
1

			1	2	3
1	(Rwanda) (Libya)	Etienne Niyigena; Mohammed Ghshuot	4; 6	6; 2	6^{6} 7^{8}
2	(Rwanda) (Libya)	Olivier Havugimana; Ahmed Mouhan	6; 2	6; 3
3	(Rwanda) (Libya)	Hamissi Gatete / Etienne Niyigena; Mohammed Ghshuot / Ahmed Mouhan	7^{8} 6^{6}	6; 2
