= 2016 Davis Cup Africa Zone Group III =

International tennis competition

The Africa Zone was one of the four zones within Group 3 of the regional Davis Cup competition in 2016. The zone's competition was held in round robin format in Antananarivo, Madagascar, in July 2016. Two nations won promotion to Group II, Europe/Africa Zone, for 2017.

== Participating nations ==
- Algeria
- Benin
- Botswana
- Cameroon
- Kenya
- Madagascar
- Morocco
- Mozambique
- Namibia
- Nigeria

=== Inactive nations ===
- Angola
- Burkina Faso
- Congo
- Djibouti
- Ethiopia
- Gabon
- Ghana
- Ivory Coast
- Lesotho
- Libya
- Mali
- Mauritius
- Rwanda
- Senegal
- Sudan
- Togo
- Uganda
- Zambia

== Draw ==
Date: 11–16 July 2016

Location: Antananarivo University, Antananarivo, Madagascar (clay)

Format: Round-robin basis. Four pools of five teams (Pools A and B). The winners of each pool play-off against the runners-up of the other pool to determine which two nations are promoted to Europe/Africa Zone Group II in 2017.

Seeding: The seeding was based on the Davis Cup Rankings of 7 March 2016 (shown in parentheses below).

Pot 1	Pot 2	Pot 3	Pot 4	Pot 5
1. Morocco (68); 2. Algeria (80)	3. Benin (83); 4. Namibia (84)	5. Madagascar (101); 6. Mozambique (105)	7. Nigeria (113); 8. Botswana (119)	9. Cameroon (122); 10. Kenya (127)

Group A

	Morocco	Namibia	Nigeria	Cameroon	Mozambique	RR W–L	Matches W–L	Sets W–L	Games W–L	Standings
Morocco		3–0	2–1	3–0	3–0	4–0	11–1	22–4	148–66	1
Namibia	0–3		2–1	3–0	3–0	3–1	8–4	16–10	127–105	2
Nigeria	1–2	1–2		3–0	3–0	2–2	8–4	17–8	125–105	3
Cameroon	0–3	0–3	0–3		3–0	1–3	3–9	9–18	118–134	4
Mozambique	0–3	0–3	0–3	0–3		0–4	0–12	0–24	36–144	5

Group B

	Madagascar	Benin	Kenya	Algeria	Botswana	RR W–L	Matches W–L	Sets W–L	Games W–L	Standings
Madagascar		2–1	3–0	3–0	3–0	4–0	11–1	22–6	151–86	1
Benin	1–2		2–1	3–0	3–0	3–1	9–3	21–6	150–93	2
Kenya	0–3	1–2		3–0	2–1	2–2	6–6	14–14	127–129	3
Algeria	0–3	0–3	0–3		2–1	1–3	2–10	5–22	90–149	4
Botswana	0–3	0–3	1–2	1–2		0–4	2–10	6–20	82–143	5

== First round ==
=== Group A ===
==== Morocco vs. Mozambique ====
Morocco
3
Antananarivo University, Antananarivo, Madagascar
11 July 2016
Clay

Mozambique
0

			1	2	3
1	(Morocco) (Mozambique)	Yassine Idmbarek; Jossefa Simao Elias	6; 2	6; 2
2	(Morocco) (Mozambique)	Amine Ahouda; Hercilio Rafael Seda	6; 1	6; 0
3	(Morocco) (Mozambique)	Amine Ahouda / Khalid Alouch; Bruno Figueiredo / Hercilio Rafael Seda	6; 3	6; 0

==== Namibia vs. Nigeria ====
Namibia
2
Antananarivo University, Antananarivo, Madagascar
11 July 2016
Clay

Nigeria
1

			1	2	3
1	(Namibia) (Nigeria)	Jean Erasmus; Sylvester Emmanuel	2; 6	3; 6
2	(Namibia) (Nigeria)	Tuki Jacobs; Moses Michael	6; 3	6; 4
3	(Namibia) (Nigeria)	Jean Erasmus / Tuki Jacobs; Abdul-Mumin Babalola / Lawal Shehu	6; 4	7; 5

==== Morocco vs. Namibia ====
Morocco
3
Antananarivo University, Antananarivo, Madagascar
12 July 2016
Clay

Namibia
0

			1	2	3
1	(Morocco) (Namibia)	Yassine Idmbarek; Jean Erasmus	6; 1	6; 3
2	(Morocco) (Namibia)	Amine Ahouda; Tuki Jacobs	6; 3	6; 4
3	(Morocco) (Namibia)	Khalid Alouch / Ayoub Chakrouni; Tuki Jacobs / Gideon Van Dyk	6; 1	6; 3

==== Mozambique vs. Cameroon ====
Mozambique
0
Antananarivo University, Antananarivo, Madagascar
12 July 2016
Clay

Cameroon
3

			1	2	3
1	(Mozambique) (Cameroon)	Jossefa Simao Elias; Blaise Nkwenti	1; 6	0; 6
2	(Mozambique) (Cameroon)	Hercilio Rafael Seda; Augustin Ntouba	2; 6	2; 6
3	(Mozambique) (Cameroon)	Jossefa Simao Elias / Bruno Figueiredo; Augustin Ntouba / Étienne Teboh	3; 6	2; 6

==== Namibia vs. Cameroon ====
Namibia
3
Antananarivo University, Antananarivo, Madagascar
13 July 2016
Clay

Cameroon
0

			1	2	3
1	(Namibia) (Cameroon)	Jean Erasmus; Blaise Nkwenti	5; 7	6; 3	6; 4
2	(Namibia) (Cameroon)	Tuki Jacobs; Étienne Teboh	7; 5	4; 6	6; 4
3	(Namibia) (Cameroon)	Jean Erasmus / Tuki Jacobs; Augustin Ntouba / Étienne Teboh	6; 3	6; 2

==== Morocco vs. Nigeria ====
Morocco
2
Antananarivo University, Antananarivo, Madagascar
13 July 2016
Clay

Nigeria
1

			1	2	3
1	(Morocco) (Nigeria)	Yassine Idmbarek; Sylvester Emmanuel	6^{5} 7^{7}	6; 1	6; 0
2	(Morocco) (Nigeria)	Amine Ahouda; Moses Michael	6; 1	6; 1
3	(Morocco) (Nigeria)	Khalid Alouch / Ayoub Chakrouni; Abdul-Mumin Babalola / Lawal Shehu	3; 6	4; 6

==== Namibia vs. Mozambique ====
Namibia
3
Antananarivo University, Antananarivo, Madagascar
14 July 2016
Clay

Mozambique
0

			1	2	3
1	(Namibia) (Mozambique)	Jean Erasmus; Jossefa Simao Elias	6; 1	6; 1
2	(Namibia) (Mozambique)	Tuki Jacobs; Hercilio Rafael Seda	6; 0	6; 0
3	(Namibia) (Mozambique)	Fritz Jacobs / Gideon Van Dyk; Bruno Figueiredo / Armindo Junior Nhavene	6; 3	6; 2

==== Nigeria vs. Cameroon ====
Nigeria
3
Antananarivo University, Antananarivo, Madagascar
14 July 2016
Clay

Cameroon
0

			1	2	3
1	(Nigeria) (Cameroon)	Sylvester Emmanuel; Augustin Ntouba	6; 4	7^{7} 6^{4}
2	(Nigeria) (Cameroon)	Moses Michael; Blaise Nkwenti	7; 5	7^{7} 6^{3}
3	(Nigeria) (Cameroon)	Abdul-Mumin Babalola / Lawal Shehu; Blaise Nkwenti / Étienne Teboh	6; 4	6; 2

==== Mozambique vs. Nigeria ====
Mozambique
0
Antananarivo University, Antananarivo, Madagascar
15 July 2016
Clay

Nigeria
3

			1	2	3
1	(Mozambique) (Nigeria)	Armindo Junior Nhavene; Sylvester Emmanuel	1; 6	1; 6
2	(Mozambique) (Nigeria)	Jossefa Simao Elias; Moses Michael	1; 6	4; 6
3	(Mozambique) (Nigeria)	Bruno Figueiredo / Hercilio Rafael Seda; Abdul-Mumin Babalola / Lawal Shehu	4; 6	0; 6

==== Morocco vs. Cameroon ====
Morocco
3
Antananarivo University, Antananarivo, Madagascar
15 July 2016
Clay

Cameroon
0

			1	2	3
1	(Morocco) (Cameroon)	Khalid Alouch; Étienne Teboh	6; 2	6; 3
2	(Morocco) (Cameroon)	Amine Ahouda; Blaise Nkwenti	6; 1	6; 0
3	(Morocco) (Cameroon)	Khalid Alouch / Ayoub Chakrouni; Augustin Ntouba / Étienne Teboh	2; 6	7; 5	6; 4

=== Group B ===
==== Algeria vs. Madagascar ====
Algeria
0
Antananarivo University, Antananarivo, Madagascar
11 July 2016
Clay

Madagascar
3

			1	2	3
1	(Algeria) (Madagascar)	Youcef Ghezal; Jacob Rasolondrazana	1; 6	4; 6
2	(Algeria) (Madagascar)	Mohamed Hassan; Antso Rakotondramanga	0; 6	0; 6
3	(Algeria) (Madagascar)	Youcef Ghezal / Youcef Rihane; Lucas Andriamasilalao / Jean-Jacques Rakotohasy	4; 6	1; 6

==== Benin vs. Botswana ====
Benin
3
Antananarivo University, Antananarivo, Madagascar
11 July 2016
Clay

Botswana
0

			1	2	3
1	(Benin) (Botswana)	Loic Didavi; Lefa Ashley Sibanda	6; 2	7; 5
2	(Benin) (Botswana)	Alexis Klegou; Phenyo Matong	6; 1	6; 1
3	(Benin) (Botswana)	Felix Hounkpevi / Magloire Yakpa; Aobakwe Lekang / Bayani Moilwa	6; 3	6; 2

==== Algeria vs. Benin ====
Algeria
0
Antananarivo University, Antananarivo, Madagascar
12 July 2016
Clay

Benin
3

			1	2	3
1	(Algeria) (Benin)	Youcef Rihane; Loic Didavi	3; 6	4; 6
2	(Algeria) (Benin)	Mohamed Hassan; Alexis Klegou	2; 6	4; 6
3	(Algeria) (Benin)	Mohamed Hassan / Youcef Rihane; Loic Didavi / Alexis Klegou	1; 6	1; 6

==== Madagascar vs. Kenya ====
Madagascar
3
Antananarivo University, Antananarivo, Madagascar
12 July 2016
Clay

Kenya
0

			1	2	3
1	(Madagascar) (Kenya)	Jacob Rasolondrazana; Kevin Cheruiyot	6; 0	6; 4
2	(Madagascar) (Kenya)	Antso Rakotondramanga; Ismael Changawa Ruwa Mzai	4; 6	7^{10} 6^{8}	6; 1
3	(Madagascar) (Kenya)	Jean-Jacques Rakotohasy / Antso Rakotondramanga; Ismael Changawa Ruwa Mzai / Ibrahim Kibet Yego	4; 6	6; 3	6; 3

==== Algeria vs. Botswana ====
Algeria
2
Antananarivo University, Antananarivo, Madagascar
13 July 2016
Clay

Botswana
1

			1	2	3
1	(Algeria) (Botswana)	Youcef Rihane; Lefa Ashley Sibanda	6; 2	1; 6	6; 1
2	(Algeria) (Botswana)	Mohamed Hassan; Phenyo Matong	5; 7	2; 6
3	(Algeria) (Botswana)	Youcef Ghezal / Youcef Rihane; Phenyo Matong / Lefa Ashley Sibanda	7^{9} 6^{7}	5; 7	7; 5

==== Benin vs. Kenya ====
Benin
2
Antananarivo University, Antananarivo, Madagascar
13 July 2016
Clay

Kenya
1

			1	2	3
1	(Benin) (Kenya)	Loic Didavi; Kevin Cheruiyot	6; 2	6; 4
2	(Benin) (Kenya)	Alexis Klegou; Ismael Changawa Ruwa Mzai	6; 3	7^{7} 6^{3}
3	(Benin) (Kenya)	Felix Hounkpevi / Magloire Yakpa; Kevin Cheruiyot / Ibrahim Kibet Yego	6; 3	4; 6	3; 6

==== Benin vs. Madagascar ====
Benin
1
Antananarivo University, Antananarivo, Madagascar
14 July 2016
Clay

Madagascar
2

			1	2	3
1	(Benin) (Madagascar)	Loic Didavi; Jacob Rasolondrazana	6; 2	6; 3
2	(Benin) (Madagascar)	Alexis Klegou; Antso Rakotondramanga	6; 3	3; 6	5; 7
3	(Benin) (Madagascar)	Loic Didavi / Alexis Klegou; Jean-Jacques Rakotohasy / Antso Rakotondramanga	6; 1	4; 6	3; 6

==== Botswana vs. Kenya ====
Botswana
1
Antananarivo University, Antananarivo, Madagascar
14 July 2016
Clay

Kenya
2

			1	2	3
1	(Botswana) (Kenya)	Lefa Ashley Sibanda; Ibrahim Kibet Yego	6; 4	6; 3
2	(Botswana) (Kenya)	Phenyo Matong; Ismael Changawa Ruwa Mzai	4; 6	0; 6
3	(Botswana) (Kenya)	Aobakwe Lekang / Bayani Moilwa; Ismael Changawa Ruwa Mzai / Ibrahim Kibet Yego	2; 6	2; 6

==== Madagascar vs. Botswana ====
Madagascar
3
Antananarivo University, Antananarivo, Madagascar
15 July 2016
Clay

Botswana
0

			1	2	3
1	(Madagascar) (Botswana)	Jean-Jacques Rakotohasy; Lefa Ashley Sibanda	6; 0	6; 1
2	(Madagascar) (Botswana)	Jacob Rasolondrazana; Phenyo Matong	6; 3	6; 2
3	(Madagascar) (Botswana)	Lucas Andriamasilalao / Jean-Jacques Rakotohasy; Aobakwe Lekang / Bayani Moilwa	6; 1	6; 1

==== Algeria vs. Kenya ====
Algeria
0
Antananarivo University, Antananarivo, Madagascar
15 July 2016
Clay

Kenya
3

			1	2	3
1	(Algeria) (Kenya)	Youcef Ghezal; Kevin Cheruiyot	4; 6	2; 6
2	(Algeria) (Kenya)	Mohamed Hassan; Ismael Changawa Ruwa Mzai	4; 6	1; 6
3	(Algeria) (Kenya)	Mohamed Hassan / Youcef Rihane; Olivier Kigotho / Ibrahim Kibet Yego	6^{3} 7^{7}	6; 0	3; 6

== Play-offs ==
Placing	A Team	Score	B Team
Promotional	Morocco	2–0	Benin
Promotional	Namibia	0–2	Madagascar
5th–6th	Nigeria	2–1	Kenya
7th–8th	Cameroon	0–2	Algeria
9th–10th	Mozambique	0–2	Botswana

=== Promotional ===
==== Morocco vs. Benin ====
Morocco
2
Antananarivo University, Antananarivo, Madagascar
16 July 2016
Clay

Benin
0

			1	2	3
1	(Morocco) (Benin)	Yassine Idmbarek; Loic Didavi	6; 2	6; 0
2	(Morocco) (Benin)	Amine Ahouda; Alexis Klegou	6; 3	6; 4
3	(Morocco) (Benin)	Khalid Alouch / Ayoub Chakrouni; Loic Didavi / Alexis Klegou				not played

==== Namibia vs. Madagascar ====
Namibia
0
Antananarivo University, Antananarivo, Madagascar
16 July 2016
Clay

Madagascar
2

			1	2	3
1	(Namibia) (Madagascar)	Jean Erasmus; Jean-Jacques Rakotohasy	1; 6	2; 6
2	(Namibia) (Madagascar)	Tuki Jacobs; Antso Rakotondramanga	2; 6	6; 2	3; 6
3	(Namibia) (Madagascar)	Jean Erasmus / Tuki Jacobs; Jean-Jacques Rakotohasy / Antso Rakotondramanga				not played

=== 5th−6th ===
==== Nigeria vs. Kenya ====
Nigeria
2
Antananarivo University, Antananarivo, Madagascar
16 July 2016
Clay

Kenya
1

			1	2	3
1	(Nigeria) (Kenya)	Sylvester Emmanuel; Kevin Cheruiyot	6; 1	2; 6	6; 4
2	(Nigeria) (Kenya)	Moses Michael; Ismael Changawa Ruwa Mzai	2; 6	2; 6
3	(Nigeria) (Kenya)	Abdul-Mumin Babalola / Lawal Shehu; Ismael Changawa Ruwa Mzai / Ibrahim Kibet Yego	6; 1	3; 6	7^{7} 6^{3}

=== 7th−8th ===
==== Cameroon vs. Algeria ====
Cameroon
0
Antananarivo University, Antananarivo, Madagascar
16 July 2016
Clay

Algeria
2

			1	2	3
1	(Cameroon) (Algeria)	Étienne Teboh; Youcef Rihane	2; 6	3; 6
2	(Cameroon) (Algeria)	Augustin Ntouba; Mohamed Hassan	3; 6	3; 6
3	(Cameroon) (Algeria)	Augustin Ntouba / Etienna Teboh; Youcef Ghezal / Mohamed Hassan				not played

=== 9th−10th ===
==== Mozambique vs. Botswana ====
Mozambique
0
Antananarivo University, Antananarivo, Madagascar
16 July 2016
Clay

Botswana
2

			1	2	3
1	(Mozambique) (Botswana)	Bruno Figuriredo; Aobakwe Lekang	1; 6	1; 6
2	(Mozambique) (Botswana)	Hercilio Rafael Seda; Phenyo Matong	2; 6	5; 7
3	(Mozambique) (Botswana)	Jossefa Simao Elias / Hercilio Rafael Seda; Bayani Moilwa / Lefa Ashley Sibanda				not played
