= 2014 Davis Cup Africa Zone Group III =

International tennis competition

The Africa Zone was one of the four zones within Group 3 of the regional Davis Cup competition in 2014. The zone's competition was held in round robin format in Smash Tennis Academy, Cairo, Egypt, September 8–13, on outdoor clay courts. The nine competing nations were divided into one pool of four teams and one of five. The winners and runners up from each pool played off to determine the two nations to be promoted to Europe/Africa Zone Group II in 2015, while the third and fourth placed nations played to off to determine overall placings within the group.

== Participating nations ==
- Algeria
- Benin
- Botswana
- Congo
- Madagascar
- Mozambique
- Namibia
- Nigeria
- Zimbabwe

== Draw ==
The eight teams were divided into one pool of four teams, and one of five. The winner of each pool plays off against the runner-up of the other pool, and the two winners of these play-offs are promoted to Europe/Africa Zone Group II in 2015. The third and fourth placed teams in each pool play off against the equivalent team from the other pool to determine overall rankings within the group. The fifth placed team in pool B does not enter the play-offs.

Pool A

	Zimbabwe	Madagascar	Nigeria	Congo	RR W–L	Matches W–L	Sets W–L	Games W–L	Standings
Zimbabwe		2–1	3–0	3–0	3–0	8–1	17–3	118–58	1
Madagascar	1–2		3–0	3–0	2–1	7–2	13–5	99–53	2
Nigeria	0–3	0–3		3–0	1–2	3–6	6–10	61–61	3
Congo	0–3	0–3	0–3		0–3	0–9	0–18	2–108	4

Pool B

	Algeria	Namibia	Benin	Mozambique	Botswana	RR W–L	Matches W–L	Sets W–L	Games W–L	Standings
Algeria		3–0	3–0	3–0	3–0	4–0	12–0	24–3	157–81	1
Namibia	0–3		2–1	3–0	3–0	3–1	8–4	17–10	133–104	2
Benin	0–3	1–2		2–1	3–0	2–2	6–6	16–13	137–118	3
Mozambique	0–3	0–3	1–2		2–1	1–3	3–9	7–20	95–142	4
Botswana	0–3	0–3	0–3	1–2		0–4	1–11	4–22	73–150	5

== First round ==
=== Pool A ===
==== Zimbabwe vs. Congo ====
Zimbabwe
3
Smash Tennis Academy, Cairo, Egypt
8 September 2014
Red Clay, Outdoor

Congo
0

			1	2	3
1	(Zimbabwe) (Republic of the Congo)	Tinotenda Chanakira; Pagnol Madzou	6; 0	6; 0
2	(Zimbabwe) (Republic of the Congo)	Benjamin Lock; Armel Mokobo	6; 1	6; 0
3	(Zimbabwe) (Republic of the Congo)	Tinotenda Chanakira / Mark Fynn; Pagnol Madzou / Armel Mokobo	6; 0	6; 0

==== Madagascar vs. Congo ====
Madagascar
3
Smash Tennis Academy, Cairo, Egypt
9 September 2014
Red Clay, Outdoor

Congo
0

			1	2	3
1	(Madagascar) (Republic of the Congo)	Tony Rajaobelina; Pagnol Madzou	6; 0	6; 0
2	(Madagascar) (Republic of the Congo)	Antso Rakotondramanga; Armel Mokobo	6; 0	6; 0
3	(Madagascar) (Republic of the Congo)	Tony Rajaobelina / Lofo Ramiaramanana; Pagnol Madzou / Armel Mokobo	6; 0	6; 0

==== Zimbabwe vs. Nigeria ====
Zimbabwe
3
Smash Tennis Academy, Cairo, Egypt
10 September 2014
Red Clay, Outdoor

Nigeria
0

			1	2	3
1	(Zimbabwe) (Nigeria)	Benjamin Lock; Sylvester Emmanuel	6; 3	6; 3
2	(Zimbabwe) (Nigeria)	Takanyi Garanganga; Clifford Enosoregbe	6; 4	6; 2
3	(Zimbabwe) (Nigeria)	Mark Fynn / Benjamin Lock; Henry Atseye / Clifford Enosoregbe	6; 4	6; 2

==== Nigeria vs. Congo ====
Nigeria
3
Smash Tennis Academy, Cairo, Egypt
11 September 2014
Red Clay, Outdoor

Congo
0

			1	2	3
1	(Nigeria) (Republic of the Congo)	Sylvester Emmanuel; Pagnol Madzou	6; 0	6; 0
2	(Nigeria) (Republic of the Congo)	Clifford Enosoregbe; Armel Mokobo	6; 0	6; 0
3	(Nigeria) (Republic of the Congo)	Henry Atseye / Sylvester Emmanuel; Pagnol Madzou / Armel Mokobo	6; 0	6; 1

==== Zimbabwe vs. Madagascar ====
Zimbabwe
2
Smash Tennis Academy, Cairo, Egypt
11 September 2014
Red Clay, Outdoor

Madagascar
1

			1	2	3
1	(Zimbabwe) (Madagascar)	Benjamin Lock; Lofo Ramiaramanana	4; 6	6; 4	6^{6} 7^{8}
2	(Zimbabwe) (Madagascar)	Takanyi Garanganga; Antso Rakotondramanga	6; 1	6; 4
3	(Zimbabwe) (Madagascar)	Mark Fynn / Takanyi Garanganga; Tony Rajaobelina / Lofo Ramiaramanana	6; 4	5; 7	7^{7} 6^{0}

==== Madagascar vs. Nigeria ====
Madagascar
3
Smash Tennis Academy, Cairo, Egypt
12 September 2014
Red Clay, Outdoor

Nigeria
0

			1	2	3
1	(Madagascar) (Nigeria)	Tony Rajaobelina; Sylvester Emmanuel	6; 2	6; 0
2	(Madagascar) (Nigeria)	Antso Rakotondramanga; Clifford Enosoregbe	6; 3	6; 2
3	(Madagascar) (Nigeria)	Tony Rajaobelina / Lofo Ramiaramanana; Henry Atseye / Sylvester Emmanuel				w/o

=== Pool B ===
==== Algeria vs. Botswana ====
Algeria
3
Smash Tennis Academy, Cairo, Egypt
8 September 2014
Red Clay, Outdoor

Botswana
0

			1	2	3
1	(Algeria) (Botswana)	Nazim Makhlouf; Shingirai Muzondiwa	6; 3	6; 2
2	(Algeria) (Botswana)	Mohamed Hassan; Phenyo Matong	6; 2	6; 3
3	(Algeria) (Botswana)	Mohamed Amine Kerroum / Hichem Yasri; Lame Botshoma / Thabiso Mabaka	6; 1	7; 5

==== Benin vs. Mozambique ====
Benin
2
Smash Tennis Academy, Cairo, Egypt
8 September 2014
Red Clay, Outdoor

Mozambique
1

			1	2	3
1	(Benin) (Mozambique)	Magloire Yakpa; Franco Mata	5; 7	6; 4	2; 6
2	(Benin) (Mozambique)	Félix Hounkpèvi; Ataide Mussagy Suca	6; 1	1; 6	7; 5
3	(Benin) (Mozambique)	Félix Hounkpèvi / Théophile Segodo; Feliciano dos Santos Guilande / Franco Mata	6; 1	6; 4

==== Namibia vs. Botswana ====
Namibia
3
Smash Tennis Academy, Cairo, Egypt
9 September 2014
Red Clay, Outdoor

Botswana
0

			1	2	3
1	(Namibia) (Botswana)	Jacobus Serdyn; Shingirai Muzondiwa	6; 2	6; 3
2	(Namibia) (Botswana)	Tukhula Jacobs; Phenyo Matong	5; 7	6; 2	6; 0
3	(Namibia) (Botswana)	Ben Piet O'Callaghan / Jacobus Serdyn; Lame Botshoma / Thabiso Mabaka	6; 2	6; 1

==== Algeria vs. Mozambique ====
Algeria
3
Smash Tennis Academy, Cairo, Egypt
9 September 2014
Red Clay, Outdoor

Mozambique
0

			1	2	3
1	(Algeria) (Mozambique)	Nazim Makhlouf; Franco Mata	6; 3	7^{11} 6^{9}
2	(Algeria) (Mozambique)	Mohamed Hassan; Ataide Mussagy Suca	6; 1	6; 3
3	(Algeria) (Mozambique)	Mohamed Amine Kerroum / Hichem Yasri; Feliciano dos Santos Guilande / Jossefa Simao Elias	6; 1	6; 1

==== Benin vs. Namibia ====
Benin
1
Smash Tennis Academy, Cairo, Egypt
10 September 2014
Red Clay, Outdoor

Namibia
2

			1	2	3
1	(Benin) (Namibia)	Jean Segodo; Jacobus Serdyn	6; 4	6^{2} 7^{7}	4; 6
2	(Benin) (Namibia)	Félix Hounkpèvi; Tukhula Jacobs	6^{9} 7^{11}	1; 6
3	(Benin) (Namibia)	Théophile Segodo / Magloire Yakpa; Herman Kuschke / Ben Piet O'Callaghan	6; 2	6; 1

==== Botswana vs. Mozambique ====
Botswana
1
Smash Tennis Academy, Cairo, Egypt
10 September 2014
Red Clay, Outdoor

Mozambique
2

			1	2	3
1	(Botswana) (Mozambique)	Lame Botshoma; Jossefa Simao Elias	4; 6	6; 3	1; 6
2	(Botswana) (Mozambique)	Shingirai Muzondiwa; Franco Mata	7; 5	6; 4
3	(Botswana) (Mozambique)	Lame Botshoma / Thabiso Mabaka; Franco Mata / Ataide Mussagy Suca	2; 6	4; 6

==== Benin vs. Algeria ====
Benin
0
Smash Tennis Academy, Cairo, Egypt
11 September 2014
Red Clay, Outdoor

Algeria
3

			1	2	3
1	(Benin) (Algeria)	Jean Segodo; Nazim Makhlouf	2; 6	0; 6
2	(Benin) (Algeria)	Félix Hounkpèvi; Mohamed Hassan	6; 4	2; 6	2; 6
3	(Benin) (Algeria)	Théophile Segodo / Magloire Yakpa; Mohamed Amine Kerroum / Hichem Yasri	4; 6	6; 0	5; 7

==== Namibia vs. Mozambique ====
Namibia
3
Smash Tennis Academy, Cairo, Egypt
11 September 2014
Red Clay, Outdoor

Mozambique
0

			1	2	3
1	(Namibia) (Mozambique)	Jacobus Serdyn; Feliciano dos Santos Guilande	6; 3	6; 2
2	(Namibia) (Mozambique)	Tukhula Jacobs; Ataide Mussagy Suca	6; 0	6; 2
3	(Namibia) (Mozambique)	Ben Piet O'Callaghan / Jacobus Serdyn; Jossefa Simao Elias / Ataide Mussagy Suca	6; 0	6; 3

==== Benin vs. Botswana ====
Benin
3
Smash Tennis Academy, Cairo, Egypt
12 September 2014
Red Clay, Outdoor

Botswana
0

			1	2	3
1	(Benin) (Botswana)	Magloire Yakpa; Shingirai Muzondiwa	6; 2	6; 1
2	(Benin) (Botswana)	Théophile Segodo; Phenyo Matong	6; 1	6; 1
3	(Benin) (Botswana)	Félix Hounkpèvi / Théophile Segodo; Thabiso Mabaka / Phenyo Matong	6; 1	6; 1

==== Algeria vs. Namibia ====
Algeria
3
Smash Tennis Academy, Cairo, Egypt
12 September 2014
Red Clay, Outdoor

Namibia
0

			1	2	3
1	(Algeria) (Namibia)	Nazim Makhlouf; Jacobus Serdyn	6; 4	6; 2
2	(Algeria) (Namibia)	Mohamed Hassan; Tukhula Jacobs	6; 2	6; 4
3	(Algeria) (Namibia)	Mohamed Amine Kerroum / Hichem Yasri; Herman Kuschke / Jacobus Serdyn	6; 0	6^{6} 7^{8}	6; 4

== Play-offs ==
=== Promotion ===
==== Zimbabwe vs. Namibia ====
Zimbabwe
2
Smash Tennis Academy, Cairo, Egypt
13 September 2014
Red Clay, Outdoor

Namibia
0

			1	2	3
1	(Zimbabwe) (Namibia)	Benjamin Lock; Jacobus Serdyn	6; 0	6; 1
2	(Zimbabwe) (Namibia)	Takanyi Garanganga; Tukhula Jacobs	6; 2	6; 2
3	(Zimbabwe) (Namibia)	Mark Fynn / Benjamin Lock; Tukhula Jacobs / Jacobus Serdyn				not played

==== Madagascar vs. Algeria ====
Madagascar
2
Smash Tennis Academy, Cairo, Egypt
13 September 2014
Red Clay, Outdoor

Algeria
0

			1	2	3
1	(Madagascar) (Algeria)	Tony Rajaobelina; Nazim Makhlouf	6; 0	6; 2
2	(Madagascar) (Algeria)	Antso Rakotondramanga; Mohamed Hassan	6; 2	6; 1
3	(Madagascar) (Algeria)	Tony Rajaobelina / Lofo Ramiaramanana; Mohamed Amine Kerroum / Hichem Yasri				not played

=== 5th place play-off: Nigeria vs. Benin ===
Nigeria
1
Smash Tennis Academy, Cairo, Egypt
13 September 2014
Red Clay, Outdoor

Benin
2

			1	2	3
1	(Nigeria) (Benin)	Henry Atseye; Magloire Yakpa	2; 3			retired
2	(Nigeria) (Benin)	Clifford Enosoregbe; Théophile Segodo	6; 0	6; 4
3	(Nigeria) (Benin)	Henry Atseye / Clifford Enosoregbe; Félix Hounkpèvi / Théophile Segodo				w/o

=== 7th place play-off: Congo vs. Mozambique ===
Congo
0
Smash Tennis Academy, Cairo, Egypt
13 September 2014
Red Clay, Outdoor

Mozambique
2

			1	2	3
1	(Republic of the Congo) (Mozambique)	Pagnol Madzou; Franco Mata	0; 6	0; 6
2	(Republic of the Congo) (Mozambique)	Armel Mokobo; Ataide Mussagy Suca	0; 6	2; 6
3	(Republic of the Congo) (Mozambique)	/ /				not played

== Final standings ==
Rank	Team
1	Madagascar
1	Zimbabwe
3	Algeria
3	Namibia
5	Benin
6	Nigeria
7	Mozambique
8	Congo
9	Botswana

- Madagascar and Zimbabwe were promoted to Europe/Africa Zone Group II in 2015.
- Tunisia was suspended from Davis Cup competition for one year for violation of ITF rules, after the Tunisian Tennis Federation ordered Malek Jaziri not to play against Israeli opponent Amir Weintraub during the 2013 Tashkent Challenger, an ATP Challenger Tour event in October 2013.
