= Sylvester Emmanuel =

Nigerian tennis player (born 1998)

- Country (sports): Nigeria
- Born: 4 April 1998 (age 27)
- Height: 180 cm (5 ft 11 in)
- Prize money: $10,375

Singles
- Career record: 0–0 (at ATP Tour level, Grand Slam level)
- Career titles: 0; 0 Challenger, 0 Futures
- Highest ranking: No. 1,097 (12 December 2016)
- Current ranking: No. 1,888 (1 February 2021)

Doubles
- Career record: 0–0 (at ATP Tour level, Grand Slam level)
- Career titles: 0; 0 Challenger, 0 Futures
- Highest ranking: No. 867 (19 June 2017)
- Current ranking: No. 1,639 (1 February 2021)

Team competitions
- Davis Cup: 13–7
- Last updated on: 1 February 2021.

Sylvester Emmanuel (born 4 April 1998) is a Nigerian tennis player.

Emmanuel has a career high ATP singles ranking of 1097 achieved on 12 December 2016. He also has a career high ATP doubles ranking of 867, achieved on 19 June 2017. Emmanuel hasn't won ITF title.

Emmanuel has represented Nigeria at Davis Cup, where he has a win-loss record of 13–7.

== Future and Challenger finals ==
=== Doubles 1 (0–1) ===
Legend
Challengers 0 (0–0)
Futures 1 (0–1)

| Outcome | No. | Date | Tournament | Surface | Partner | Opponents | Score |
|---|---|---|---|---|---|---|---|
| Runner-up | 1. | 13 May 2017 | Abuja, Nigeria F2 | Hard | (France) Calvin Hemery | (Italy) Alessandro Bega (Norway) Viktor Durasovic | 4–6, 0–6 |

== Davis Cup ==
=== Participations: (13–7) ===
| Group membership World Group (0–0) WG Play-off (0–0) Group I (0–0) Group II (0–0) Group III (13–7) Group IV (0–0) | Matches by surface Hard (0–0) Clay (13–7) Grass (0–0) Carpet (0–0) | Matches by type Singles (10–5) Doubles (3–2) |

- ▲ ▼ indicates the outcome of the Davis Cup match followed by the score, date, place of event, the zonal classification and its phase, and the court surface.

| Rubber outcome | No. | Rubber | Match type (partner if any) | Opponent nation | Opponent player(s) | Score |
▼0–3; 10 September 2014; Smash Tennis Academy, Cairo, Egypt; Europe/Africa Zone Group III Round Robin; Clay surface
| Defeat | 1 | I | Singles | Zimbabwe | Benjamin Lock | 3–6, 3–6 |
▲3–0; 11 September 2014; Smash Tennis Academy, Cairo, Egypt; Europe/Africa Zone Group III Round Robin; Clay surface
| Victory | 2 | I | Singles | (Republic of the Congo) Congo | Pagnol Madzou | 6–0, 6–0 |
| Victory | 3 | III | Doubles (with Henry Atseye) (dead rubber) | (Republic of the Congo) Congo | Pagnol Madzou / Armel Mokobo | 6–0, 6–1 |
▼0–3; 12 September 2014; Smash Tennis Academy, Cairo, Egypt; Europe/Africa Zone Group III Round Robin; Clay surface
| Defeat | 4 | I | Singles | Madagascar | Tony Rajaobelina | 2–6, 0–6 |
| Defeat | – | III | Doubles (with Henry Atseye) (dead rubber) | Madagascar | Tony Rajaobelina / Lofo Ramiaramanana | WO * |
▼1–2; 11 July 2016; University of Antananarivo, Antananarivo, Madagascar; Europe/Africa Zone Group III Round Robin; Clay surface
| Victory | 5 | I | Singles | Namibia | Jean Erasmus | 6–2, 6–3 |
▼1–2; 13 July 2016; University of Antananarivo, Antananarivo, Madagascar; Europe/Africa Zone Group III Round Robin; Clay surface
| Defeat | 6 | I | Singles | Morocco | Yassine Idmbarek | 7–6^{(7–5)}, 1–6, 0–6 |
▲3–0; 14 July 2016; University of Antananarivo, Antananarivo, Madagascar; Europe/Africa Zone Group III Round Robin; Clay surface
| Victory | 7 | I | Singles | Cameroon | Augustin Ntouba | 6–4, 7–6^{(7–4)} |
▲3–0; 15 July 2016; University of Antananarivo, Antananarivo, Madagascar; Europe/Africa Zone Group III Round Robin; Clay surface
| Victory | 8 | I | Singles | Mozambique | Armindo Junior Nhavene | 6–1, 6–1 |
▲2–1; 16 July 2016; University of Antananarivo, Antananarivo, Madagascar; Europe/Africa Zone Group III 5th-6th Playoff; Clay surface
| Victory | 9 | I | Singles | Kenya | Kevin Cheruiyot | 6–1, 2–6, 6–4 |
▼0–3; 17 July 2017; Solaimaneyah Club, Cairo, Egypt; Europe/Africa Zone Group III Round Robin; Clay surface
| Defeat | 10 | II | Singles | Egypt | Karim-Mohamed Maamoun | 0–6, 3–6 |
▼1–2; 19 July 2017; Solaimaneyah Club, Cairo, Egypt; Europe/Africa Zone Group III Round Robin; Clay surface
| Victory | 11 | II | Singles | Zimbabwe | Takanyi Garanganga | 6–3, 7–5 |
| Defeat | 12 | III | Doubles (with Abdul-Mumin Babalola) | Zimbabwe | Takanyi Garanganga / Benjamin Lock | 6–7^{(4–7)}, 6–4, 3–6 |
▲3–0; 21 July 2017; Solaimaneyah Club, Cairo, Egypt; Europe/Africa Zone Group III Round Robin; Clay surface
| Victory | 13 | III | Doubles (with Joseph Imeh Ubon) (dead rubber) | Rwanda | Etienne Niyigena / Fabrice Tuyishime | 6–1, 6–3 |
▲2–0; 21 July 2017; Solaimaneyah Club, Cairo, Egypt; Europe/Africa Zone Group III 5th-6th Playoff; Clay surface
| Victory | 14 | II | Singles | Algeria | Youcef Ghezal | 6–3, 6–4 |
▲3–0; 19 June 2018; Nairobi Club, Nairobi, Kenya; Europe/Africa Zone Group III Round Robin; Clay surface
| Victory | 15 | I | Singles | Rwanda | Ernest Habiyambere | 6–1, 7–5 |
▲2–1; 21 June 2018; Nairobi Club, Nairobi, Kenya; Europe/Africa Zone Group III Round Robin; Clay surface
| Victory | 16 | I | Singles | Cameroon | Étienne Teboh | 6–4, 6–4 |
| Victory | 17 | III | Doubles (with Joseph Imeh Ubon) | Cameroon | Blaise Nkwenti / Cédric Ngoumtsa | 4–6, 7–6^{(9–7)}, 6–4 |
▼0–3; 22 June 2018; Nairobi Club, Nairobi, Kenya; Europe/Africa Zone Group III Round Robin; Clay surface
| Defeat | 18 | I | Singles | Benin | Delmas N'tcha | 4–6, 3–6 |
▼1–2; 23 June 2018; Nairobi Club, Nairobi, Kenya; Europe/Africa Zone Group III 1st-4th Playoff; Clay surface
| Victory | 19 | I | Singles | Namibia | Jean Erasmus | 6–1, 6–2 |
| Defeat | 20 | III | Doubles (with Joseph Imeh Ubon) | Namibia | Jean Erasmus / Tukhula Jacobs | 6–7^{(1–7)}, 4–6 |

* Walkover doesn't count in his overall record.

== Record against other players ==
Emmanuel's match record against players who have been ranked in the top 100, with those who are active in boldface.
ATP Tour, Challenger and Future tournaments' main draw and qualifying matches are considered.

| Opponent | Highest ranking | Matches | Won | Lost | Win % | Last match |
|---|---|---|---|---|---|---|
| (United States) **Sebastian Korda** | 38 | 1 | 0 | 1 | 0% | Lost (6–4, 2–6, 4–6) at 2016 United States F7 Q2 |
| (Spain) Pere Riba | 65 | 1 | 0 | 1 | 0% | Lost (2–6, 2–6) at 2015 Nigeria F3 2R |
| (Canada) **Brayden Schnur** | 92 | 1 | 0 | 1 | 0% | Lost (3–6, 4–6) at 2017 Nigeria F2 2R |
| Total | | 3 | 0 | 3 | 0% | * Statistics correct as of 25 October 2021 |
