= 2015 Davis Cup Africa Zone Group III =

International tennis competition

The Africa Zone was one of the four zones within Group 3 of the regional Davis Cup competition in 2015. The zone's competition was held in round robin format in Cairo, Egypt, in October 2015. The eight competing nations were divided into two pools of four. The winners and runners up from each pool played off to determine the two nations to be promoted to Europe/Africa Zone Group II in 2016, while the third and fourth placed nations played to off to determine overall placings within the group.

== Participating nations ==
- Algeria
- Benin
- Egypt
- Ghana
- Libya
- Mozambique
- Namibia
- Tunisia

== Draw ==
The eight teams were divided into two pools of four. The winner of each pool plays off against the runner-up of the other pool, and the two winners of these play-offs are promoted to Europe/Africa Zone Group II in 2016. The third and fourth placed teams in each pool play off against the equivalent team from the other pool to determine overall rankings within the group.

The group was staged from 26 to 29 October 2015 at the Smash Tennis Academy in Cairo, Egypt.

Pool A

	Tunisia	Namibia	Algeria	Ghana	RR W–L	Matches W–L	Sets W–L	Games W–L	Standings
Tunisia		3–0	3–0	3–0	3–0	9–0	18–0	111–33	1
Namibia	0–3		2–1	2–1	2–1	4–5	9–11	71–96	2
Algeria	0–3	1–2		3–0	1–2	4–5	8–12	76–97	3
Ghana	0–3	0–3	1–2		0–3	1–8	4–16	76–108	4

Pool B

	Egypt	Benin	Mozambique	Libya	RR W–L	Matches W–L	Sets W–L	Games W–L	Standings
Egypt		2–1	3–0	3–0	3–0	8–1	17–2	110–37	1
Benin	1–2		2–1	3–0	2–1	6–3	13–7	92–75	2
Mozambique	0–3	1–2		3–0	1–2	4–5	7–11	62–78	3
Libya	0–3	0–3	0–3		0–3	0–9	0–17	27–101	4

== First round ==
=== Pool A ===
==== Algeria vs. Tunisia ====
Algeria
0
Smash Tennis Academy, Cairo, Egypt
26 October 2015
Clay

Tunisia
3

			1	2	3
1	(Algeria) (Tunisia)	Youcef Ghezal; Skander Mansouri	2; 6	0; 6
2	(Algeria) (Tunisia)	Mohamed Hassan; Majed Kilani	1; 6	5; 7
3	(Algeria) (Tunisia)	Mohamed Hassan / Aymen Ikhlef; Aziz Dougaz / Skander Mansouri	1; 6	2; 6

==== Namibia vs. Ghana ====
Namibia
2
Smash Tennis Academy, Cairo, Egypt
26 October 2015
Clay

Ghana
1

			1	2	3
1	(Namibia) (Ghana)	Jacobus Serdyn; Wisdom Na-Adjrago	2; 6	1; 6
2	(Namibia) (Ghana)	Tukhula Jacobs; George Darko	6; 3	7; 5
3	(Namibia) (Ghana)	Tukhula Jacobs / Gideon van Dyk; George Darko / Wisdom Na-Adjrago	6; 4	4; 6	6; 3

==== Algeria vs. Ghana ====
Algeria
3
Smash Tennis Academy, Cairo, Egypt
27 October 2015
Clay

Ghana
0

			1	2	3
1	(Algeria) (Ghana)	Aymen Ikhlef; Wisdom Na-Adjrago	6; 3	6; 1
2	(Algeria) (Ghana)	Mohamed Hassan; George Darko	6; 2	6; 2
3	(Algeria) (Ghana)	Youcef Ghezal / Mohamed Hassan; Pascal Alome / Japheth Anwasiba Bagerbaseh	7^{11} 6^{9}	1; 6	6; 2

==== Namibia vs. Tunisia ====
Namibia
0
Smash Tennis Academy, Cairo, Egypt
27 October 2015
Clay

Tunisia
3

			1	2	3
1	(Namibia) (Tunisia)	Gideon van Dyk; Aziz Dougaz	1; 6	0; 6
2	(Namibia) (Tunisia)	Tukhula Jacobs; Malek Jaziri	0; 6	1; 6
3	(Namibia) (Tunisia)	Jacobus Serdyn / Gideon van Dyk; Majed Kilani / Skander Mansouri	0; 6	2; 6

==== Algeria vs. Namibia ====
Algeria
1
Smash Tennis Academy, Cairo, Egypt
28 October 2015
Clay

Namibia
2

			1	2	3
1	(Algeria) (Namibia)	Aymen Ikhlef; Gideon van Dyk	6^{5} 7^{7}	6; 3	6; 1
2	(Algeria) (Namibia)	Mohamed Hassan; Tukhula Jacobs	1; 6	3; 6
3	(Algeria) (Namibia)	Youcef Ghezal / Mohamed Hassan; Tukhula Jacobs / Gideon van Dyk	2; 6	2; 6

==== Ghana vs. Tunisia ====
Ghana
0
Smash Tennis Academy, Cairo, Egypt
28 October 2015
Clay

Tunisia
3

			1	2	3
1	(Ghana) (Tunisia)	Japheth Anwasiba Bagerbaseh; Majed Kilani	1; 6	3; 6
2	(Ghana) (Tunisia)	Pascal Alome; Aziz Dougaz	1; 6	2; 6
3	(Ghana) (Tunisia)	George Darko / Wisdom Na-Adjrago; Aziz Dougaz / Majed Kilani	5; 7	6^{1} 7^{7}

=== Pool B ===
==== Egypt vs. Mozambique ====
Egypt
3
Smash Tennis Academy, Cairo, Egypt
26 October 2015
Clay

Mozambique
0

			1	2	3
1	(Egypt) (Mozambique)	Karim-Mohamed Maamoun; Franco Mata	6; 1	6; 1
2	(Egypt) (Mozambique)	Mohamed Safwat; Hugo Moreira	6; 0	6; 4
3	(Egypt) (Mozambique)	Karim-Mohamed Maamoun / Sherif Sabry; Franco Mata / Hugo Moreira	6; 4	6; 0

==== Benin vs. Libya ====
Benin
3
Smash Tennis Academy, Cairo, Egypt
26 October 2015
Clay

Libya
0

			1	2	3
1	(Benin) (Libya)	Félix Hounkpèvi; Aous Almabrouk	6; 4	6; 0
2	(Benin) (Libya)	Alexis Klégou; Mohammed Alfeetouri	6; 1	6; 0
3	(Benin) (Libya)	Jean Segodo / Théophile Segodo; Mohammed Alfeetouri / Mohammed Elgamal	6; 3	7; 5

==== Egypt vs. Libya ====
Egypt
3
Smash Tennis Academy, Cairo, Egypt
27 October 2015
Clay

Libya
0

			1	2	3
1	(Egypt) (Libya)	Karim Hossam; Aous Almabrouk	6; 1	6; 0
2	(Egypt) (Libya)	Sherif Sabry; Mohammed Alfeetouri	6; 1	6; 1
3	(Egypt) (Libya)	Karim Hossam / Sherif Sabry; Mohammed Alfeetouri / Mohammed Elgamal	6; 2	6; 0

==== Benin vs. Mozambique ====
Benin
2
Smash Tennis Academy, Cairo, Egypt
27 October 2015
Clay

Mozambique
1

			1	2	3
1	(Benin) (Mozambique)	Félix Hounkpèvi; Franco Mata	6; 2	2; 6	1; 6
2	(Benin) (Mozambique)	Alexis Klégou; Hugo Moreira	6; 3	6; 0
3	(Benin) (Mozambique)	Alexis Klégou / Jean Segodo; Franco Mata / Hugo Moreira	6; 4	6; 3

==== Benin vs. Egypt ====
Benin
1
Smash Tennis Academy, Cairo, Egypt
28 October 2015
Clay

Egypt
2

			1	2	3
1	(Benin) (Egypt)	Théophile Segodo; Karim-Mohamed Maamoun	0; 6	2; 6
2	(Benin) (Egypt)	Alexis Klégou; Mohamed Safwat	6; 3	3; 6	7; 5
3	(Benin) (Egypt)	Félix Hounkpèvi / Alexis Klégou; Sherif Sabry / Mohamed Safwat	2; 6	2; 6

==== Mozambique vs. Libya ====
Mozambique
3
Smash Tennis Academy, Cairo, Egypt
28 October 2015
Clay

Libya
0

			1	2	3
1	(Mozambique) (Libya)	Franco Mata; Mohammed Elgamal	6; 2	6; 0
2	(Mozambique) (Libya)	Jossefa Simao Elias; Aous Almabrouk	4; 3			retired
3	(Mozambique) (Libya)	Jossefa Simao Elias / Hugo Moreira; Mohammed Alfeetouri / Mohammed Elgamal	6; 3	6; 1

== Play-offs ==
=== Promotion ===
==== Tunisia vs. Benin ====
Tunisia
2
Smash Tennis Academy, Cairo, Egypt
29 October 2015
Clay

Benin
0

			1	2	3
1	(Tunisia) (Benin)	Skander Mansouri; Jean Segodo	6; 2	6; 0
2	(Tunisia) (Benin)	Malek Jaziri; Alexis Klégou	6^{5} 7^{7}	6; 1	6; 1
3	(Tunisia) (Benin)	Malek Jaziri / Skander Mansouri; Alexis Klégou / Jean Segodo				not played

==== Egypt vs. Namibia ====
Egypt
2
Smash Tennis Academy, Cairo, Egypt
29 October 2015
Clay

Namibia
0

			1	2	3
1	(Egypt) (Namibia)	Sherif Sabry; Gideon van Dyk	6; 4	6; 1
2	(Egypt) (Namibia)	Mohamed Safwat; Tukhula Jacobs	6; 4	6; 4
3	(Egypt) (Namibia)	Karim-Mohamed Maamoun / Sherif Sabry; Tukhula Jacobs / Gideon van Dyk				not played

=== 5th place play-off: Algeria vs. Mozambique ===
Algeria
2
Smash Tennis Academy, Cairo, Egypt
29 October 2015
Clay

Mozambique
1

			1	2	3
1	(Algeria) (Mozambique)	Youcef Ghezal; Franco Mata	4; 6	7^{7} 6^{4}	3; 6
2	(Algeria) (Mozambique)	Mohamed Hassan; Hugo Moreira	6; 4	6; 1
3	(Algeria) (Mozambique)	Youcef Ghezal / Mohamed Hassan; Franco Mata / Hugo Moreira	6; 3	1; 6	6; 2

=== 7th place play-off: Ghana vs. Libya ===
Ghana
2
Smash Tennis Academy, Cairo, Egypt
29 October 2015
Clay

Libya
0

			1	2	3
1	(Ghana) (Libya)	Japheth Anwasiba Bagerbaseh; Mohammed Elgamal	6; 4	6; 0
2	(Ghana) (Libya)	Wisdom Na-Adjrago; Mohammed Alfeetouri	6; 1	6; 2
3	(Ghana) (Libya)	George Darko / Wisdom Na-Adjrago; Mohammed Alfeetouri / Mohammed Elgamal				not played

== Outcomes ==
- Egypt and Tunisia are promoted to Europe/Africa Zone Group II in 2016
- Algeria, Benin, Ghana, Libya, Mozambique and Namibia remain in Africa Zone Group III in 2016
