= Amine Ahouda =

Moroccan tennis player (born 1997)

- Full name: Amine Ahouda
- Country (sports): Morocco
- Born: 11 September 1997 (age 28) Casablanca, Morocco
- Height: 1.85 m (6 ft 1 in)
- Plays: Right-handed (two-handed backhand)
- Prize money: $42,388

Singles
- Career record: 3–7 (at ATP Tour level, Grand Slam level, and in Davis Cup)
- Career titles: 0
- Highest ranking: No. 668 (19 June 2017)
- Current ranking: No. 1617T (16 March 2020)

Doubles
- Career record: 0–6 (at ATP Tour level, Grand Slam level, and in Davis Cup)
- Career titles: 0
- Highest ranking: No. 882 (29 October 2018)
- Current ranking: — (16 March 2020)

Team competitions
- Davis Cup: 8–6
- Last updated on: 16 March 2020.

Amine Ahouda (born 11 September 1997) is a Moroccan tennis player.

Ahouda has a career high ATP singles ranking of No. 668 achieved on 19 June 2017. He has a career high ATP doubles ranking of No. 882 achieved on 29 October 2018.

In April 2016 he received a wild card for the singles and doubles main draw of the ATP Grand Prix Hassan II in Marrakesh, Morocco. He made his debut against Thiemo de Bakker in the singles draw, and alongside Yassine Idmbarek, he played against the #2 seed Marc López and David Marrero.

His first ATP career win came against the #8 seed Marcel Granollers at the 2017 Grand Prix Hassan II.

Ahouda has represented Morocco at Davis Cup, where he has a win–loss record of 7–3.

== Medal matches ==
=== Singles: 2 ===
| Result | Year | Tournament | Surface | Opponent | Score |
|---|---|---|---|---|---|
| 4th Place | 2017 | Islamic Solidarity Games (Baku) | Hard | (Qatar) Mubarak Shannan Zayid | 0–6, 0–0, ret. |
| 4th Place | 2018 | Mediterranean Games (Tarragona) | Clay | (Italy) Jacopo Berrettini | 0–6, 0–3, ret. |

=== Doubles: 1 (1 Bronze medal) ===
| Result | Year | Tournament | Surface | Partner | Opponents | Score |
|---|---|---|---|---|---|---|
| Bronze | 2017 | Islamic Solidarity Games (Baku) | Hard | (Morocco) Ayoub Chakrouni | (Malaysia) Ahmed Deedat Abdul Razak (Malaysia) Mohd Assri Merzuki | 4–6, 6–3, [10–7] |

== Future and Challenger finals ==
=== Singles: 1 (0–1) ===
Legend
Challengers 0 (0–0)
Futures 1 (0–1)

| Outcome | No. | Date | Tournament | Surface | Opponent | Score |
|---|---|---|---|---|---|---|
| Runner-up | 1. | November 28, 2015 | Rabat, Morocco F6 | Clay | (Spain) Marcos Giraldi Requena | 2–6, 3–6 |

=== Doubles 4 (2–2) ===
Legend
Challengers 0 (0–0)
Futures 4 (2–2)

| Outcome | No. | Date | Tournament | Surface | Partner | Opponents | Score |
|---|---|---|---|---|---|---|---|
| Winner | 1. | November 14, 2015 | Casablanca, Morocco F4 | Clay | (Morocco) Yassine Idmbarek | (Portugal) Nuno Borges (Portugal) Francisco Cabral | 6–2, 1–6, [10–8] |
| Runner-up | 2. | March 6, 2016 | Hammamet, Tunisia F8 | Clay | (Morocco) Yassine Idmbarek | (Italy) Antonio Campo (Italy) Walter Trusendi | 4–6, 1–6 |
| Winner | 3. | November 4, 2017 | Casablanca, Morocco F4 | Clay | (Morocco) Lamine Ouahab | (Lithuania) Laurynas Grigelis (France) Laurent Rochette | 6–2, 3–6, [10–6] |
| Runner-up | 4. | November 11, 2017 | Beni Mellal, Morocco F5 | Clay | (Morocco) Lamine Ouahab | (Spain) Javier Barranco Cosano (Italy) Raúl Brancaccio | 6–2, 2–6, [4–10] |

== Davis Cup ==
=== Participations: (8–6) ===
| Group membership World Group (0–0) WG Play-off (0–0) Group I (0–0) Group II (2–6) Group III (6–0) Group IV (0–0) | Matches by surface Hard (0–1) Clay (8–4) Grass (0–0) Carpet (0–1) | Matches by type Singles (7–4) Doubles (1–2) |

- ▲ ▼ indicates the outcome of the Davis Cup match followed by the score, date, place of event, the zonal classification and its phase, and the court surface.

| Rubber outcome | No. | Rubber | Match type (partner if any) | Opponent nation | Opponent player(s) | Score |
▲3–0; 11 July 2016; University of Antananarivo, Antananarivo, Madagascar; Africa Zone Group III Round Robin; Clay surface
| Victory | 1 | II | Singles | Mozambique | Jossefa Simao Elias | 6–1, 6–0 |
| Victory | 2 | III | Doubles (with Khalid Alouch) | Mozambique | Bruno Figueiredo / Hercilio Rafael Seda | 6–3, 6–0 |
▲3–0; 12 July 2016; University of Antananarivo, Antananarivo, Madagascar; Africa Zone Group III Round Robin; Clay surface
| Victory | 3 | II | Singles | Namibia | Tuki Jacobs | 6–3, 6–4 |
▲2–1; 13 July 2016; University of Antananarivo, Antananarivo, Madagascar; Africa Zone Group III Round Robin; Clay surface
| Victory | 4 | II | Singles | Nigeria | Moses Michael | 6–1, 6–1 |
▲3–0; 15 July 2016; University of Antananarivo, Antananarivo, Madagascar; Africa Zone Group III Round Robin; Clay surface
| Victory | 5 | II | Singles | Cameroon | Blaise Nkwenti | 6–1, 6–0 |
▲2–0; 15 July 2016; University of Antananarivo, Antananarivo, Madagascar; Africa Zone Group III Promotional Play off; Clay surface
| Victory | 6 | II | Singles | Benin | Alexis Klégou | 6–3, 6–4 |
▼1–4; 3–5 February 2017; Vejlby-Risskov Idrætscenter, Aarhus, Denmark; Europe/Africa Zone II First round; Carpet (indoor) surface
| Defeat | 7 | I | Singles | Denmark | Frederik Nielsen | 1–6, 3–6, 3–6 |
▲3–2; 7–9 April 2017; Royal Tennis Club, Marrakesh, Morocco; Europe/Africa Zone II Relegation Play off; Clay surface
| Victory | 8 | I | Singles | Latvia | Miķelis Lībietis | 6–3, 4–6, 6–3, 6–2 |
| Defeat | 9 | III | Doubles (with Reda El Amrani) | Latvia | Miķelis Lībietis / Mārtiņš Podžus | 6–4, 6–7^{(5–7)}, 6–7^{(4–7)}, 3–6 |
| Defeat | 10 | V | Singles | Latvia | Mārtiņš Podžus | 1–6, RET |
▲3–1; 3–4 February 2018; Royal Tennis Club, Marrakesh, Morocco; Europe/Africa Zone II First round; Clay surface
| Victory | 11 | II | Singles | (Georgia (country)) Georgia | Nikoloz Basilashvili | 3–6, 6–3, 6–3 |
| Defeat | 12 | III | Doubles (with Lamine Ouahab) | (Georgia (country)) Georgia | Nikoloz Basilashvili / Aleksandre Metreveli | 6–7^{(4–7)}, 6–4, 2–6 |
▼0–5; 7–8 April 2018; Sala Polivalenta Cluj-Napoca, Cluj-Napoca, Romania; Europe/Africa Zone II Quarter-final; Hard (indoor) surface
| Defeat | 13 | I | Singles | Romania | Marius Copil | 0–6, 1–6 |
▼2–3; 5–6 April 2019; Royal Tennis Club, Marrakesh, Morocco; Europe/Africa Zone II First round; Clay surface
| Defeat | 14 | V | Singles | Lithuania | Laurynas Grigelis | 4–6, 2–6 |
