= 1991 Davis Cup =

Tennis tournament

Details
- Duration: 1 February – 1 December 1991
- Edition: 80th
- Teams: 87

Champion
- Winning nation: France

The 1991 Davis Cup (also known as the 1991 Davis Cup by NEC for sponsorship purposes) was the 80th edition of the Davis Cup, the most important tournament between national teams in men's tennis. 88 teams would enter the competition, 16 in the World Group, 20 in the Americas Zone, 20 in the Asia/Oceania Zone, and 32 in the Europe/Africa Zone. Congo, the Eastern Caribbean, El Salvador and Saudi Arabia made their first appearances in the tournament.

This year's tournament saw the Germany Davis Cup team representing all parts of Germany for the first time since 1939, following the reunification of West and East Germany into a single German state in October 1990. The breakup of Yugoslavia during the tournament also resulted in impacts for the Yugoslavia Davis Cup team, after high-profile Croatian players Goran Ivanišević and Goran Prpić withdrew from the Yugoslav team following Croatia's declaration of independence in June 1991.

France defeated the United States in the final, held at the Palais des Sports de Gerland in Lyon, France, on 29 November–1 December, to win their first title since 1932 and their 7th title overall.

== World Group ==
Participating teams
Argentina	Australia	Austria	Belgium
Canada	Czechoslovakia	France	Germany
Israel	Italy	Mexico	New Zealand
Spain	Sweden	United States	Yugoslavia

=== Draw ===
First round 1–3 February; 29–31 March
Mexico City, Mexico (hard)
United States	3
Mexico	2
Murcia, Spain (clay)
Spain	4
Canada	1
Christchurch, New Zealand (grass)
Argentina	4
New Zealand	1
Dortmund, Germany (indoor carpet)
Germany	3
Italy	2
Zagreb, Yugoslavia (indoor clay)
Yugoslavia	4
Sweden	1
Prague, Czechoslovakia (indoor carpet)
Czechoslovakia	4
Austria	1
Rennes, France (indoor clay)
Israel	0
France	5
Perth, Australia (grass)
Belgium	0
Australia	5

Quarterfinals; March–June
Newport, RI, United States (grass)
United States	4
Spain	1
Berlin, Germany (indoor carpet)
Argentina	0
Germany	5
Prague, Czechoslovakia (indoor carpet)
Yugoslavia	4
Czechoslovakia	1
Nîmes, France (clay)
France	3
Australia	2

Semifinals; 20–22 September
Kansas City, MO, United States (indoor clay)
United States	3
Germany	2
Pau, France (indoor carpet)
Yugoslavia	0
France	5

Final; 29 November-1 December
Lyon, France (indoor carpet)
United States	1
France	3

=== Final ===
France vs. United States

France
3
Palais des Sports de Gerland, Lyon, France
29 November–1 December 1991
Carpet (indoors)

United States
1

			1	2	3	4	5
1	(France) (United States)	Guy Forget; Andre Agassi	7^{9} 6^{7}	2; 6	1; 6	2; 6
2	(France) (United States)	Henri Leconte; Pete Sampras	6; 4	7; 5	6; 4
3	(France) (United States)	Guy Forget / Henri Leconte; Ken Flach / Robert Seguso	6; 1	6; 4	4; 6	6; 2
4	(France) (United States)	Guy Forget; Pete Sampras	7^{8} 6^{6}	3; 6	6; 3	6; 4
5	(France) (United States)	Henri Leconte; Andre Agassi						not played

== World Group qualifying round ==
Date: 20–22 September

The eight losing teams in the World Group first round ties and eight winners of the Zonal Group I final round ties competed in the World Group qualifying round for spots in the 1992 World Group.

Home team	Score	Visiting team	Location	Venue	Door	Surface
Great Britain	3–1	Austria	Manchester	Northern Lawn Tennis Club	Outdoor	Grass
Belgium	4–1	Israel	Brussels	Royal Primerose Tennis Club	Outdoor	Clay
Brazil	4–1	India	São Paulo	Esporte Clube Pinheiros	Outdoor	Clay
Cuba	2–3	Canada	Havana	Complejo de Canchas	Outdoor	Hard
Italy	4–1	Denmark	Bari	Bari Tennis Club	Outdoor	Clay
Mexico	0–5	Netherlands	Mexico City	Club Alemán de México	Outdoor	Clay
Switzerland	5–0	New Zealand	Baden	Bareeg Tennis Club	Indoor	Carpet
Philippines	0–5	Sweden	Manila	Ninoy Aquino Stadium	Indoor	Carpet

- Belgium, Canada, Italy and Sweden remain in the World Group in 1992.
- Brazil, Great Britain, Netherlands and Switzerland are promoted to the World Group in 1992.
- Cuba, Denmark, India and Philippines remain in Zonal Group I in 1992.
- Austria, Israel, Mexico and New Zealand are relegated to Zonal Group I in 1992.

== Americas Zone ==
=== Group I ===
First Round; 1–4 February
Cuba
bye
bye
Paraguay
São Paulo, Brazil (hard)
Brazil	3
Peru	1
bye
Uruguay

Second Round; 29–31 March
Havana, Cuba (hard)
Cuba	5
Paraguay	0
Brasília, Brazil (indoor carpet)
Brazil	4
Uruguay	1

- Cuba and Brazil advance to World Group qualifying round.
- Peru relegated to Group II in 1992.

=== Group II ===
First Round; 1–3 February
Chile
bye
San Salvador, El Salvador (clay)
Dominican Republic	4
El Salvador	1
Port of Spain, Trinidad and Tobago (hard)
Ecuador	5
Trinidad and Tobago	0
Port-au-Prince, Haiti (clay)
Haiti	1
Venezuela	4
Nassau, Bahamas (hard)
Bahamas	4
Costa Rica	1
Cochabamba, Bolivia (clay)
Bolivia	2
Barbados	3
St. John's, Antigua and Barbuda (hard)
Eastern Caribbean	3
Guatemala	2
Kingston, Jamaica (hard)
Jamaica	2
Colombia	3

Second Round; 29 March–7 April
Santiago, Chile (clay)
Chile	5
Dominican Republic	0
Caracas, Venezuela (hard)
Ecuador	2
Venezuela	3
Nassau, Bahamas (hard)
Bahamas	3
Barbados	2
St. John's, Antigua and Barbuda (hard)
Eastern Caribbean	0
Colombia	5

Third Round; 19–28 July
Santiago, Chile (clay)
Chile	3
Venezuela	2
Cali, Colombia (clay)
Bahamas	1
Colombia	4

Third Round; 20–22 September
Medellín, Colombia (clay)
Chile	3
Colombia	1

- Chile promoted to Group I in 1992.

== Asia/Oceania Zone ==
=== Group I ===
Preliminary round 8–10 February
Bangkok, Thailand (hard)
India	5
Thailand	0

- Thailand relegated to Group II in 1992.

First round 29–31 March
South Korea
bye
Jaipur, India (grass)
India	4
Indonesia	1
Kagoshima, Japan (indoor carpet)
Philippines	4
Japan	1
bye
China

Second round 3–5 May
New Delhi, India (grass)
South Korea	2
India	3
Manila, Philippines (indoor hard)
Philippines	4
China	1

- India and Philippines advance to World Group qualifying round.

=== Group II ===
First round 3–12 May
Pakistan
bye
Iraq
Jordan	w/o
Chinese Taipei
bye
Kuala Lumpur, Malaysia (indoor hard)
Saudi Arabia	1
Malaysia	4
Manama, Bahrain (hard)
Bangladesh	3
Bahrain	2
Colombo, Sri Lanka (clay)
Syria	0
Sri Lanka	5
Singapore (hard)
Singapore	5
Kuwait	0
bye
Hong Kong

Second round 13–16 June
Amman, Jordan (hard)
Pakistan	5
Jordan	0
Kuala Lumpur, Malaysia (indoor hard)
Chinese Taipei	3
Malaysia	2
Dhaka, Bangladesh (hard)
Bangladesh	0
Sri Lanka	5
Singapore (hard)
Singapore	0
Hong Kong	5

Third round 19–21 July
Taipei, Taiwan (hard)
Pakistan	0
Chinese Taipei	5
Causeway Bay, Hong Kong (hard)
Sri Lanka	2
Hong Kong	3

Third round 20–22 September
Taipei, Taiwan (indoor hard)
Chinese Taipei	3
Hong Kong	2

- Chinese Taipei promoted to Group I in 1992.

== Europe/Africa Zone ==
=== Group I ===
First Round
Netherlands
bye
Porto, Portugal (indoor clay)
Portugal	5
Ireland	0
Poznań, Poland (indoor carpet)
Poland	5
Romania	0
bye
Great Britain
Finland
bye
Rungsted, Denmark (indoor carpet)
Morocco	0
Denmark	5
Budapest, Hungary (indoor carpet)
Soviet Union	4
Hungary	1
bye
Switzerland

Second Round
Lisbon, Portugal (clay)
Netherlands	4
Portugal	1
Warsaw, Poland (clay)
Poland	1
Great Britain	4
Helsinki, Finland (hard)
Finland	2
Denmark	3
Davos, Switzerland (indoor carpet)
Soviet Union	2
Switzerland	3

- Netherlands, Great Britain, Denmark and Switzerland advance to World Group qualifying round.

Relegation Play-off; 3–5 May
Bucharest, Romania (clay)
Ireland	0
Romania	5
Budapest, Hungary (clay)
Morocco	0
Hungary	5

- Ireland and Morocco relegated to Group II in 1992.

=== Group II Europe ===
Quarterfinals; 3–5 May
Oslo, Norway (indoor carpet)
Norway	5
Bulgaria	0
Nicosia, Cyprus (clay)
Greece	5
Cyprus	0
Luxembourg City, Luxembourg (indoor hard)
Luxembourg	5
Monaco	0
Marsa, Malta (hard)
Malta	2
Turkey	3

Second Round; 14–16 June
Oslo, Norway (clay)
Norway	4
Greece	1
Luxembourg City, Luxembourg (indoor hard)
Luxembourg	5
Turkey	0

Third Round; 19–21 July
Oslo, Norway (clay)
Norway	4
Luxembourg	1

- Norway promoted to Group I in 1992.

=== Group II Africa ===
First round 1–3 February; 3–10 May
Nigeria
bye
Ndola, Zambia (clay)
Zambia	3
Cameroon	2
Zimbabwe
bye
Nairobi, Kenya (clay)
Kenya	5
Congo	0
Algiers, Algeria (clay)
Algeria	2
Ivory Coast	3
bye
Togo
Cairo, Egypt (clay)
Senegal	2
Egypt	3
bye
Ghana

Second Round; 29 March–7 April; 14–16 June
Ndola, Zambia (clay)
Nigeria	3
Zambia	2
Harare, Zimbabwe (indoor hard)
Zimbabwe	1
Kenya	4
Abidjan, Ivory Coast (indoor carpet)
Ivory Coast	5
Togo	0
Cairo, Egypt (clay)
Egypt	5
Ghana	0

Third Round; 19–28 July
Nairobi, Kenya (clay)
Nigeria	2
Kenya	3
Abidjan, Ivory Coast (hard)
Ivory Coast	4
Egypt	1

Third Round; 13–15 September
Nairobi, Kenya (clay)
Kenya	4
Ivory Coast	1

- Kenya promoted to Group I in 1992.
