= 1992 Davis Cup =

1992 edition of the Davis Cup

Details
- Duration: 31 January – 6 December 1992
- Edition: 81st
- Teams: 92

Champion
- Winning nation: United States

The 1992 Davis Cup (also known as the 1992 Davis Cup by NEC for sponsorship purposes) was the 81st edition of the Davis Cup, the most important tournament between national teams in men's tennis. 93 teams would enter the competition, 16 in the World Group, 21 in the Americas Zone, 23 in the Asia/Oceania Zone, and 33 in the Europe/Africa Zone. Due to the increased number of entries, the tournament was expanded to add a Group III in all zones, with promotion and relegation between it and Group II. Puerto Rico and Qatar made their first appearances in the tournament, and former champions South Africa returned to the tournament for the first time since 1978.

The United States defeated Switzerland in the final, held at the Tarrant County Convention Center in Fort Worth, Texas, United States, on 4–6 December, to win their 30th title overall.

== World Group ==
Participating teams
| Argentina | Australia | Belgium | Brazil |
| Canada | Czechoslovakia | France | Germany |
| Great Britain | Italy | Netherlands | Spain |
| Sweden | Switzerland | United States | Yugoslavia |

=== Draw ===
First round 31 January–2 February
Bayonne, France (indoor carpet)
France | 5
Great Britain | 0
The Hague, Netherlands (indoor carpet)
Netherlands | 1
Switzerland | 4
Rio de Janeiro, Brazil (clay)
Germany | 1
Brazil | 3
Bolzano, Italy (indoor carpet)
Spain | 1
Italy | 4
Nicosia, Cyprus (indoor carpet)
Yugoslavia | 0
Australia | 5
Vancouver, Canada (indoor carpet)
Canada | 2
Sweden | 3
Prague, Czechoslovakia (indoor carpet)
Belgium | 0
Czechoslovakia | 5
Waimea, HI, United States (hard)
Argentina | 0
United States | 5

Quarterfinals; 27–29 March
Nîmes, France (indoor clay)
France | 2
Switzerland | 3
Maceió, Brazil (clay)
Brazil | 3
Italy | 1
Lund, Sweden (indoor carpet)
Australia | 0
Sweden | 5
Fort Myers, FL, United States (hard)
Czechoslovakia | 2
United States | 3

Semifinals; 25–27 September
Geneva, Switzerland (indoor carpet)
Switzerland | 5
Brazil | 0
Minneapolis, MN, United States (indoor clay)
Sweden | 1
United States | 4

Final; 4–6 December
Fort Worth, TX, United States (indoor hard)
Switzerland | 1
United States | 3

=== Final ===
United States
3
Tarrant County Convention Center, Fort Worth, TX, United States
4–6 December 1992
Hard (indoors)

Switzerland
1

| | | | 1 | 2 | 3 | 4 | 5 |
|---|---|---|---|---|---|---|---|---|
| 1 | (United States) (Switzerland) | Andre Agassi; Jakob Hlasek | 6; 1 | 6; 2 | 6; 2 |
| 2 | (United States) (Switzerland) | Jim Courier; Marc Rosset | 3; 6 | 7^{11} 6^{9} | 6; 3 | 4; 6 | 4; 6 |
| 3 | (United States) (Switzerland) | John McEnroe / Pete Sampras; Jakob Hlasek / Marc Rosset | 6^{5} 7^{7} | 6^{7} 7^{9} | 7; 5 | 6; 1 | 6; 2 |
| 4 | (United States) (Switzerland) | Jim Courier; Jakob Hlasek | 6; 3 | 3; 6 | 6; 3 | 6; 4 |
| 5 | (United States) (Switzerland) | Andre Agassi; Marc Rosset | | | | | | not played |

== World Group qualifying round ==
Date: 25–27 September

The eight losing teams in the World Group first round ties and eight winners of the Zonal Group I final round ties competed in the World Group qualifying round for spots in the 1993 World Group.

| Home team | Score | Visiting team | Location | Venue | Door | Surface |
|---|---|---|---|---|---|---|
| Denmark | 3-2 | Argentina | Aarhus | Aarhus Idrætspark | Indoor | Carpet |
| Canada | 1-3 | Austria | Vancouver | Hollyburn Country Club | Outdoor | Grass |
| Germany | 5-0 | Belgium | Essen | Grugahalle | Indoor | Carpet |
| Cuba | w/o | Yugoslavia (Note: In response to the Yugoslav Wars and following the adoption of UN SCR 757 in May 1992, Yugoslavia was barred from competing in international sporting competition. This resulted in the Yugoslav team being disqualified from this and future Davis Cups and their Qualifying Round tie against Cuba was defaulted.) | — | — | — | — |
| Spain | 3-0 | Israel | Avilés | Real Club de Tenis Avilés | Outdoor | Clay |
| India | 4-1 | Great Britain | New Delhi | Delhi Lawn Tennis Association Complex | Outdoor | Grass |
| CIS (Note: Following the collapse of the Soviet Union in December 1991, a team representing the Commonwealth of Independent States took their place in the competition.) | 5-0 | South Korea | Moscow | Olympic Stadium | Indoor | Carpet |
| Netherlands | 4-1 | Uruguay | The Hague | Stadion Houtrust | Indoor | Carpet |

- Germany, Netherlands and Spain remain in the World Group in 1993.
- Austria, CIS, Cuba, Denmark and India are promoted to the World Group in 1993.
- Israel, South Korea and Uruguay remain in Zonal Group I in 1993.
- Argentina, Belgium, Canada and Great Britain are relegated to Zonal Group I in 1993.

== Americas Zone ==
=== Group I ===
First Round; 31 January–2 February
Asunción, Paraguay (clay)
Paraguay | 1
Cuba | 4

Second Round; 27–29 March
Santiago, Chile (clay)
Chile | 1
Cuba | 4
Montevideo, Uruguay (clay)
Uruguay | 3
Mexico | 2

- Cuba and Uruguay advance to World Group qualifying round.
- Paraguay relegated to Group II in 1993.

=== Group II ===
Relegation Play-offs
Basseterre, Saint Kitts and Nevis (hard)
Ecuador | 3
Eastern Caribbean | 2
Santo Domingo, Dominican Rep. (clay)
Dominican Republic | 5
Barbados | 0

First Round
Guayaquil, Ecuador (clay)
Peru | 3
Ecuador | 2
Gros Islet, Saint Lucia (hard)
Eastern Caribbean | 1
Bahamas | 4
Caracas, Venezuela (clay)
Dominican Republic | 0
Venezuela | 5
Cali, Colombia (clay)
Barbados | 0
Colombia | 5

Second Round
Nassau, Bahamas (hard)
Peru | 2
Bahamas | 3
Cali, Colombia (clay)
Venezuela | 3
Colombia | 2

Third Round
Caracas, Venezuela (clay)
Bahamas | 5
Venezuela | 0

- Eastern Caribbean and Barbados relegated to Group III in 1993.
- Bahamas promoted to Group I in 1993.

=== Group III ===
- Venue: Maya Country Club, San Salvador, El Salvador
- Date: 19–22 March

Group A

| | PUR | ESA | JAM | BOL | RR; W–L | Match; W–L | Set; W–L | Standings |
| Puerto Rico | | 3–0 | 2–1 | 3–0 | 3–0 | 8–1 (89%) | 17–2 (89%) | 1 |
| El Salvador | 0–3 | | 3–0 | 3–0 | 2–1 | 6–3 (67%) | 12–7 (63%) | 2 |
| Jamaica | 1–2 | 0–3 | | 3–0 | 1–2 | 4–5 (45%) | 9–12 (43%) | 3 |
| Bolivia | 0–3 | 0–3 | 0–3 | | 0–3 | 0–9 (0%) | 1–18 (5%) | 4 |

Group B

| | HAI | CRC | GUA | TRI | RR; W–L | Match; W–L | Set; W–L | Standings |
| Haiti | | 2–1 | 3–0 | 3–0 | 3–0 | 8–1 (89%) | 15–5 (75%) | 1 |
| Costa Rica | 1–2 | | 3–0 | 3–0 | 2–1 | 7–2 (78%) | 14–5 (74%) | 2 |
| Guatemala | 0–3 | 0–3 | | 2–1 | 1–2 | 2–7 (22%) | 8–13 (38%) | 3 |
| Trinidad and Tobago | 0–3 | 0–3 | 1–2 | | 0–3 | 1–8 (11%) | 3–17 (15%) | 4 |

- Puerto Rico and Haiti promoted to Group II in 1993.

== Asia/Oceania Zone ==
=== Group I ===
Relegation Play-off; 27–29 March
Tokyo, Japan (hard)
China | 2
Japan | 3

Preliminary Round; 31 January–2 February
Seoul, South Korea (indoor carpet)
South Korea | 5
China | 0
Manila, Philippines (hard)
Japan | 2
Philippines | 3

- China relegated to Group II in 1993.

First Round; 27–29 March
New Zealand
bye
Seoul, South Korea (clay)
Chinese Taipei | 0
South Korea | 5
Manila, Philippines (hard)
Philippines | 1
Indonesia | 4
bye
India

Second Round; 1–3 May
Seoul, South Korea (clay)
New Zealand | 2
South Korea | 3
Jakarta, Indonesia (clay)
Indonesia | 0
India | 5

- South Korea and India advance to World Group qualifying round.

=== Group II ===
Relegation Play-offs
Amman, Jordan (hard)
Singapore | 1
Jordan | 4
Dhaka, Bangladesh (hard)
Bangladesh | 1
Pakistan | 4

First Round
Bangkok, Thailand (hard)
Thailand | 5
Singapore | 0
Kuala Lumpur, Malaysia (indoor hard)
Malaysia | 4
Jordan | 1
Colombo, Sri Lanka (clay)
Sri Lanka | 4
Bangladesh | 1
Lahore, Pakistan (indoor hard)
Pakistan | 2
Hong Kong | 3

Second Round
Kuala Lumpur, Malaysia (hard)
Thailand | 3
Malaysia | 2
Colombo, Sri Lanka (clay)
Sri Lanka | 0
Hong Kong | 5

Third Round
Causeway Bay, Hong Kong (hard)
Thailand | 2
Hong Kong | 3

- Singapore and Bangladesh relegated to Group III in 1993.
- Hong Kong promoted to Group I in 1993.

=== Group III ===
- Venue: Isa Town Tennis Courts, Manama, Bahrain
- Date: 20–26 April

| | IRI | KUW | LIB | BHR | QAT | SYR | KSA | RR; W–L | Match; W–L | Set; W–L | Standings |
| Iran | | 3–0 | 3–0 | 2–1 | 2–1 | 2–1 | 3–0 | 6–0 | 15–3 (83%) | 30–10 (75%) | 1 |
| Kuwait | 0–3 | | 3–0 | 2–1 | 2–1 | 2–1 | 3–0 | 5–1 | 12–6 (67%) | 27–15 (64%) | 2 |
| Lebanon | 0–3 | 0–3 | | 2–1 | 2–1 | 2–1 | 3–0 | 4–2 | 9–9 (50%) | 21–19 (53%) | 3 |
| Bahrain | 1–2 | 1–2 | 1–2 | | 2–1 | 2–1 | 2–1 | 3–3 | 9–9 (50%) | 20–20 (50%) | 4 |
| Qatar | 1–2 | 1–2 | 1–2 | 1–2 | | 2–1 | 2–1 | 2–4 | 8–10 (44%) | 18–23 (44%) | 5 |
| Syria | 1–2 | 1–2 | 1–2 | 1–2 | 1–2 | | 3–0 | 1–5 | 8–10 (44%) | 19–22 (46%) | 6 |
| Saudi Arabia | 0–3 | 0–3 | 0–3 | 1–2 | 1–2 | 0–3 | | 0–6 | 2–16 (11%) | 7–33 (18%) | 7 |

- Iran and Kuwait promoted to Group II in 1993

== Europe/Africa Zone ==
=== Group I ===
First Round
CIS
bye
bye
Portugal
Nairobi, Kenya (clay)
Kenya | 3
Romania | 2
bye
Denmark
Israel
bye
Budapest, Hungary (indoor carpet)
Poland | 2
Hungary | 3
Oslo, Norway (indoor carpet)
Finland | 3
Norway | 2
bye
Austria

Second Round
Porto, Portugal (clay)
CIS | 3
Portugal | 2
Holbæk, Denmark (clay)
Kenya | 0
Denmark | 5
Ramat HaSharon, Israel (hard)
Israel | 5
Hungary | 0
Helsinki, Finland (indoor carpet)
Finland | 1
Austria | 4

- CIS, Denmark, Israel and Austria advance to World Group qualifying round.

Relegation Play-off
Oslo, Norway (indoor carpet)
Poland | 1
Norway | 4

- Romania and Poland relegated to Group II in 1993.

=== Group II ===
Relegation Play-offs
Galway, Ireland (carpet)
Ireland | 5
Malta | 0
Monte Carlo, Monaco (clay)
Monaco | 5
Zambia | 0
Accra, Ghana (hard)
Ghana | 3
Togo | 1
Turkey
Nigeria | w/o

First Round
Athens, Greece (clay)
Ireland | 1
Greece | 4
Sofia, Bulgaria (clay)
Malta | 0
Bulgaria | 5
Monte Carlo, Monaco (clay)
Luxembourg | 4
Monaco | 1
Cairo, Egypt (clay)
Zambia | 2
Egypt | 3
Harare, Zimbabwe (hard)
Zimbabwe | 4
Ghana | 1
Lomé, Togo (hard)
Togo | 2
Ivory Coast | 3
Cyprus | w/o
Turkey
Lagos, Nigeria (hard)
Nigeria | 0
Morocco | 5

Second Round
Athens, Greece (clay)
Greece | 4
Bulgaria | 1
Luxembourg City, Luxembourg (clay)
Luxembourg | 3
Egypt | 2
Abidjan, Ivory Coast (hard)
Zimbabwe | 4
Ivory Coast | 1
Nicosia, Cyprus (clay)
Cyprus | 0
Morocco | 5

Third Round
Luxembourg City, Lux. (indoor carpet)
Greece | 0
Luxembourg | 5
Harare, Zimbabwe (hard)
Zimbabwe | 4
Morocco | 1

- Malta, Zambia, Togo, and Turkey relegated to Group III in 1993.
- Luxembourg and Zimbabwe promoted to Group I in 1993.

=== Group III ===
- Venue: Tennis Club de Tunis, Tunis, Tunisia
- Date: 29 April–3 May

| | RSA | SEN | ALG | CMR | TUN | CGO | RR; W–L | Match; W–L | Set; W–L | Standings |
| South Africa | | 3–0 | 3–0 | 3–0 | 3–0 | 3–0 | 5–0 | 15–0 (100%) | 30–1 (97%) | 1 |
| Senegal | 0–3 | | 2–1 | 3–0 | 3–0 | 3–0 | 4–1 | 11–4 (73%) | 24–8 (75%) | 2 |
| Algeria | 0–3 | 1–2 | | 2–0 | 2–1 | 3–0 | 3–2 | 8–6 (57%) | 16–15 (52%) | 3 |
| Cameroon | 0–3 | 0–3 | 0–2 | | 2–1 | 2–1 | 2–3 | 4–10 (29%) | 9–22 (29%) | 4 |
| Tunisia | 0–3 | 0–3 | 1–2 | 1–2 | | 3–0 | 1–4 | 5–10 (33%) | 11–20 (35%) | 5 |
| Congo | 0–3 | 0–3 | 0–3 | 1–2 | 0–3 | | 0–5 | 1–14 (7%) | 4–28 (13%) | 6 |

- South Africa, Senegal, Algeria and Cameroon promoted to Group II in 1993.
