= 1986 Davis Cup =

1986 edition of the Davis Cup

Details
- Duration: 7 March – 28 December 1986
- Edition: 75th
- Teams: 69

Champion
- Winning nation: Australia

The 1986 Davis Cup (also known as the 1986 Davis Cup by NEC for sponsorship purposes) was the 75th edition of the Davis Cup, the most important tournament between national teams in men's tennis. This year's tournament marked the introduction of the Africa Zone, which served as a qualifying sub-round for the Europe Zone. 71 teams would enter the competition, 16 in the World Group, 33 in the Europe Zone (including 9 in the Africa Zone), 13 in the Eastern Zone, and 9 in the Americas Zone. Bangladesh, Ivory Coast, Libya, Malta and Syria made their first appearances in the tournament.

Australia defeated the two-time defending champions Sweden in the final, held at the Kooyong Stadium in Melbourne, Australia, on 26–28 December, to win their 26th Davis Cup title.

== World Group ==
Participating teams
Australia	Czechoslovakia	Denmark	Ecuador
Great Britain	India	Italy	Mexico
New Zealand	Paraguay	Soviet Union	Spain
Sweden	United States	West Germany	Yugoslavia

=== Draw ===
First round 7–10 March
Mexico City, Mexico (clay)
West Germany	2
Mexico	3
Guayaquil, Ecuador (clay)
United States	3
Ecuador	2
Auckland, New Zealand (hard)
Australia	4
New Zealand	1
Telford, United Kingdom (indoor carpet)
Spain	1
Great Britain	4
Belgrade, Yugoslavia (indoor hard)
Soviet Union	2
Yugoslavia	3
Calcutta, India (grass)
India	1
Czechoslovakia	4
Palermo, Italy (clay)
Italy	4
Paraguay	1
Brøndby, Denmark (indoor carpet)
Denmark	0
Sweden	5

Quarterfinals; 18–20 July
Mexico City, Mexico (clay)
Mexico	1
United States	4
Wimbledon, United Kingdom (grass)
Australia	4
Great Britain	1
Sarajevo, Yugoslavia (indoor hard)
Yugoslavia	0
Czechoslovakia	5
Båstad, Sweden (clay)
Italy	0
Sweden	5

Semifinals; 3–5 October
Brisbane, Australia (grass)
United States	1
Australia	3
Prague, Czechoslovakia (clay)
Czechoslovakia	1
Sweden	4

Final; 26–28 December
Melbourne, Australia (grass)
Australia	3
Sweden	2

=== Final ===
Australia vs. Sweden

Australia
3
Kooyong Stadium, Melbourne, Australia
26–28 December 1986
Grass

Sweden
2

			1	2	3	4	5
1	(Australia) (Sweden)	Pat Cash; Stefan Edberg	13; 11	13; 11	6; 4
2	(Australia) (Sweden)	Paul McNamee; Mikael Pernfors	3; 6	1; 6	3; 6
3	(Australia) (Sweden)	Pat Cash / John Fitzgerald; Stefan Edberg / Anders Järryd	6; 3	6; 4	4; 6	6; 1
4	(Australia) (Sweden)	Pat Cash; Mikael Pernfors	2; 6	4; 6	6; 3	6; 4	6; 3
5	(Australia) (Sweden)	Paul McNamee; Stefan Edberg	8; 10	4; 6

=== Relegation play-offs ===
Date: 3–5 October

Home team	Score	Visiting team	Location	Door	Surface
West Germany	5–0	Ecuador	Essen	Indoor	Carpet
Spain	5–0	New Zealand	Barcelona	Outdoor	Clay
India	4–1	Soviet Union	New Delhi	Outdoor	Grass
Paraguay	3–2	Denmark	Asunción	Outdoor	Clay

- India, Paraguay, Spain and West Germany remain in the World Group in 1987.
- Denmark, Ecuador, New Zealand and Soviet Union are relegated to Zonal competition in 1987.

== Americas Zone ==
First round 17–19 January
Chile
bye
bye
Canada
Brazil
bye
bye
Caribbean/West Indies
Colombia
bye
bye
Peru
Caracas, Venezuela (hard)
Uruguay	3
Venezuela	2
bye
Argentina

Quarterfinals; 7–9 March
Santiago, Chile (clay)
Chile	3
Canada	2
Kingston, Jamaica (hard)
Brazil	5
Caribbean/West Indies	0
Bogotá, Colombia (indoor clay)
Colombia	0
Peru	4
Buenos Aires, Argentina (clay)
Uruguay	0
Argentina	5

Semifinals; 18–20 July
São Paulo, Brazil (clay)
Chile	5
Brazil	0
Buenos Aires, Argentina (clay)
Peru	2
Argentina	3

Final; 3–5 October
Santiago, Chile (clay)
Chile	1
Argentina	4

- Argentina are promoted to the World Group in 1987.

== Eastern Zone ==
First round 7–9 March
Japan
bye
Singapore (grass)
Singapore	0
Chinese Taipei	3
China
bye
Kuala Lumpur, Malaysia (indoor carpet)
Hong Kong	3
Malaysia	2
Bangkok, Thailand (hard)
Bangladesh	0
Thailand	5
Jakarta, Indonesia (clay)
Indonesia	4
Philippines	1
Lahore, Pakistan (clay)
Pakistan	3
Sri Lanka	2
bye
South Korea

Quarterfinals; 9–11 May
Matsuyama, Japan (hard)
Japan	4
Chinese Taipei	1
Causeway Bay, Hong Kong (hard)
China	3
Hong Kong	0
Bangkok, Thailand (hard)
Thailand	4
Indonesia	0
Seoul, South Korea (clay)
Pakistan	1
South Korea	4

Semifinals; 18–20 July
Kumamoto, Japan (indoor carpet)
Japan	4
China	1
Seoul, South Korea (clay)
Thailand	0
South Korea	5

Final; 6–8 October
Seoul, South Korea (hard)
Japan	1
South Korea	4

- South Korea are promoted to the World Group in 1987.

== Europe Zone ==
=== Africa Zone ===
First round 17–19 January
Zimbabwe
bye
bye
Libya
Morocco
bye
bye
Kenya
Tunis, Tunisia (clay)
Nigeria	5
Tunisia	0
bye
Senegal
Ivory Coast
bye
bye
Algeria

Second Round; 7–9 March
Harare, Zimbabwe (hard)
Zimbabwe	5
Libya	0
Casablanca, Morocco (hard)
Morocco	3
Kenya	2
Dakar, Senegal (hard)
Nigeria	4
Senegal	1
Algiers, Algeria (clay)
Ivory Coast	0
Algeria	5

Third Round; 3–6 April
Harare, Zimbabwe (hard)
Zimbabwe	4
Morocco	1
Algiers, Algeria (clay)
Nigeria	3
Algeria	2

- Zimbabwe and Nigeria qualified to the Europe Zone main draws.

=== Europe Zone A ===
First round 9–11 May; 23–25 May
France
bye
İzmir, Turkey (clay)
Luxembourg	2
Turkey	3
Cairo, Egypt (clay)
Egypt	5
Malta	0
Haskovo, Bulgaria (clay)
Bulgaria	5
Cyprus	0
Porto, Portugal (clay)
Zimbabwe	2
Portugal	3
bye
Austria
Warsaw, Poland (clay)
Finland	2
Poland	3
bye
Romania

Quarterfinals; 13–15 June
Istanbul, Turkey (clay)
France	5
Turkey	0
Haskovo, Bulgaria (clay)
Egypt	1
Bulgaria	4
Mayrhofen, Austria (clay)
Portugal	0
Austria	5
Warsaw, Poland (clay)
Poland	1
Romania	4

Semifinals; 18–20 July
Moliets-et-Maa, France (hard)
France	5
Bulgaria	0
Bad Kleinkirchheim, Austria (clay)
Austria	3
Romania	2

Final; 1–3 October
Montpellier, France (indoor carpet)
France	4
Austria	1

- France are promoted to the World Group in 1987.

=== Europe Zone B ===
First round 9–11 May
Monaco
bye
Iran
Hungary	w/o
Switzerland
bye
Filothei, Greece (clay)
Greece	5
Syria	0
Lagos, Nigeria (clay)
Nigeria	5
Norway	0
Saudi Arabia
Netherlands	w/o
Dublin, Ireland (indoor hard)
Belgium	4
Ireland	1
bye
Israel

Quarterfinals; 13–15 June
Monte Carlo, Monaco (clay)
Monaco	2
Hungary	3
Lucerne, Switzerland (clay)
Switzerland	5
Greece	0
Benin City, Nigeria (clay)
Nigeria	2
Netherlands	3
Ramat HaSharon, Israel (hard)
Belgium	0
Israel	5

Semifinals; 18–20 July
Budapest, Hungary (clay)
Hungary	2
Switzerland	3
Scheveningen, Netherlands (clay)
Netherlands	1
Israel	3

Final; 3–5 October
St. Gallen, Switzerland (indoor carpet)
Switzerland	1
Israel	4

- Israel are promoted to the World Group in 1987.
