= Namibia Davis Cup team =

National tennis team

Namibia
- Captain: Gerrie Dippenaar
- Nations Ranking: 71▲10(novembre 2025)
- First year: 2000
- Years played: 16
- Ties played (W–L): 70 (32–38)
- Best finish: Europe/Africa Zone Group III; Promotion (2018)
- Most total wins: Connor Henry Van Schalkwyk (30–9)
- Most singles wins: Connor Henry Van Schalkwyk (19–3)
- Most doubles wins: Jean Erasmus (14–8)
- Best doubles team: Jean Erasmus & Tukhula Jacobs (7–0)
- Most ties played: Henrico Du Plessis, Jurgens Strydom (29)
- Most years played: Henrico Du Plessis, Johan Theron, Jurgens Strydom (7)

The Namibia Davis Cup team represents Namibia in Davis Cup tennis competition and is governed by the Namibia Tennis Association. They did not compete between 2010–2011 and in 2017.

They best performance was in 2018, when they went undefeated to the 2019 Davis Cup Europe/Africa Zone Group II.

== History ==
Namibia competed in its first Davis Cup in 2000.

== Current team (2022) ==
- Codie Schalk Van Schalkwyk
- Connor Henry Van Schalkwyk (Junior player)
- Steyn Dippenaar
- Risto Shilongo
- Nguvitjita Hinda

== All players ==
All the players that represented Namibia since 2000.

As of 31 May 2020

Player	W-L (Total)	W-L (Singles)	W-L (Doubles)	Ties	Debut	Years played
Nicky Buys	1–8	0–2	1–6	8	2001	3
Riaan de Witt	0–1	0–0	0–1	1	2019	1
Johan de Witt	1–4	0–0	1–4	5	2007	2
Henrico du Plessis	18–20	5–10	13–10	29	2000	7
Jean Erasmus	21–22	10–16	11–6	26	2008	6
Warren Frewer	0–1	0–0	0–1	1	2009	1
Jean-Pierre Huish	8–19	5–9	3–10	21	2000	6
Fritz Jacobs	1–0	0–0	1–0	1	2016	1
Tukhula Jacobs	26–13	16–10	10–3	26	2012	6
Herman Kuschke	0–3	0–0	0–3	3	2006	2
Ben Piet O'Callaghan	2–1	0–0	2–1	3	2014	1
Jacobus Serdyn	8–10	4–5	4–5	13	2008	4
Jurgens Strydom	18–29	10–17	8–12	29	2003	7
Johan Theron	12–19	5–17	7–2	25	2000	7
Gideon van Dyk	3–9	0–3	3–6	10	2012	5
Codie Schalk van Schalkwyk	1–6	0–4	1–2	4	2019	1
Connor Henry van Schalkwyk	0–2	0–0	0–2	2	2019	1
Kevin Wentzel	1–0	0–0	1–0	1	2000	1

== Statistics ==
Last updated: Namibia – Benin; 14 September 2019

Record

- Total: 33–41 (44.6%)

Head-to-head record (2000–)

DC team	Pld	W	L
Algeria	4	2	2
Andorra *^{8}	2	0	2
Angola	1	1	0
Armenia	1	1	0
Benin	2	1	1
Bosnia and Herzegovina	1	0	1
Botswana	2	2	0
Bulgaria	1	0	1
Cameroon	1	1	0
Denmark *^{6}	2	0	2
Egypt	1	0	1
Estonia	1	0	1
Ethiopia	1	1	0
Ghana *^{4}	5	2	3
Hungary	1	0	1
Iceland	2	1	1
Ivory Coast	1	0	1
Kenya *^{5}	3	3	0
Lithuania *^{2}	2	0	2
Madagascar *^{3}	6	2	4
North Macedonia	2	0	2
Mauritius	2	0	2
Monaco	1	0	1
Morocco	1	0	1
Mozambique	4	3	1
Nigeria	5	3	2
Norway	1	0	1
Rwanda	3	3	0
San Marino	3	3	0
Togo *^{1}	1	1	0
Tunisia	5	1	4
Turkey	1	0	1
Uganda	1	1	0
Zambia	1	1	0
Zimbabwe *^{7}	3	0	3
Total (35)	74	33	41

Record against continents

Africa	Asia	Europe	North America	Oceania	South America
Algeria; Angola; Benin; Botswana; Cameroon; Egypt; Ethiopia; Ghana; Ivory Coast; Kenya; Madagascar; Mauritius; Morocco; Mozambique; Nigeria; Rwanda; Togo; Tunisia; Uganda; Zambia; Zimbabwe		Andorra; Armenia; Bosnia and Herzegovina; Bulgaria; Denmark; Estonia; Hungary; Iceland; Lithuania; North Macedonia; Monaco; Norway; San Marino; Turkey			
Record: 28-25 (52.8%)	Record: 0-0	Record: 5-16 (23.8%)	Record: 0-0	Record: 0-0	Record: 0-0

Record by decade

- 2000–2009: 16–28 (36.4%)
- 2010–2019: 17–13 (56.7%)

Note:

- ^{1} In 2001 on the Relegation play-off group Togo-Namibia will not be played as they already played against each other in the previous round. Furthermore, the points gained at the matches played in the previous round will count for the table.
- ^{2} In 2002 on the Relegation play-off group Lithuania-Namibia will not be played as they already played against each other in the previous round. Furthermore, the points gained at the matches played in the previous round will count for the table.
- ^{3} In 2003 on the Relegation play-off group Madagascar-Namibia will not be played as they already played against each other in the previous round. Furthermore, the points gained at the matches played in the previous round will count for the table.
- ^{4} In 2004 on the Promotional play-off group Ghana-Namibia will not be played as they already played against each other in the previous round. Furthermore, the points gained at the matches played in the previous round will count for the table.
- ^{5} In 2005 on the Relegation play-off group Kenya-Namibia will not be played as they already played against each other in the previous round. Furthermore, the points gained at the matches played in the previous round will count for the table.
- ^{6} In 2006 on the Promotional play-off group Denmark-Namibia will not be played as they already played against each other in the previous round. Furthermore, the points gained at the matches played in the previous round will count for the table.
- ^{7} In 2007 on the Relegation play-off group Zimbabwe-Namibia will not be played as they already played against each other in the previous round. Furthermore, the points gained at the matches played in the previous round will count for the table.
- ^{8} In 2009 on the Relegation play-off group Andorra-Namibia will not be played as they already played against each other in the previous round. Furthermore, the points gained at the matches played in the previous round will count for the table.

== See also ==
- Davis Cup
- Namibia Billie Jean King Cup team
