= Libya Davis Cup team =

National tennis team

Libya
- Nations Ranking: 160 ▲2 (3 February 2025)
- First year: 1986
- Years played: 7
- Ties played (W–L): 22 (3-19)

The Libya Davis Cup team represents Libya in the Davis Cup tennis competition and are governed by the Libyan Tennis Federation. They have not competed since 2017.

Names of all Libyan Davis cup players: https://www.daviscup.com/en/teams/team.aspx?id=LBA

1. Mohammed Ghshuot 2. Saad El Ragig 3. Khaled Ezankouli 4. Marjaa Assayed 5. Abdul Rahman Mohamed 6. Abdul-Hakim Jteli 7. Muayed Zankuli 8. Abdel- Moneam Bornaz 9. Ahmed Mouhan 10. Sofian Mohamed A Abadi 11. Mahamed Elfeetori 12. Aoes Elmabrok 13. Sanad Rashed 14. Mohammad ElJamal

== History ==
Libya competed in its first Davis Cup in 1986, and have competed in 5 tournaments in total. Their second appearance in 1989 was followed by a twelve-year break until 2001, where they finished in last place in Europe/Africa Zone Group IV. It would be another thirteen years until Libya competed again, when in 2015 they once again came last, in Africa Zone Group III. Their fifth and, as of 2019, last appearance in the Davis Cup, in 2017, saw Libya win a tie for the first time, when they defeated Botswana in the Africa Zone Group III pool stage to finish 4th in their pool and 8th overall out of 9 competing.

== Last team (2017) ==
- Ahmed Mouhan
- Mohammed Ghshuot
- Sofian Mohamed A Abadi

== See also ==
- Davis Cup
