= Franco Mata =

- Country (sports): Mozambique
- Born: 12 July 1979 (age 46) Maputo, Mozambique
- Height: 5 ft 11 in (180 cm)
- Plays: Right-handed

Doubles
- Career record: 0–1
- Highest ranking: No. 1183 (22 May 2000)

Franco Mata (born 12 July 1979) is a Mozambican former professional tennis player.

Born in Maputo, Mata made an ATP Tour main draw appearance at the 2000 Estoril Open, partnering Angola's Nélson Almeida in the doubles. He played collegiate tennis in the United States for Florida Gulf Coast University and has represented Mozambique at the African Games. Since 2014 he has been a member of the Mozambique Davis Cup team, holding national records for most ties played and most wins.
