= Tukhula Jacobs =

Namibian tennis player

- Country (sports): Namibia
- Residence: Windhoek, Namibia
- Born: 10 December 1994 (age 30) Windhoek, Namibia
- Height: 1.88 m (6 ft 2 in)
- Plays: Right-handed (two-handed backhand)
- College: University of South Alabama (2013–17)
- Prize money: $2,748

Singles
- Career record: 16–10 (at ATP Tour level, Grand Slam level, and in Davis Cup)
- Career titles: 0
- Highest ranking: No. 1124 (25 June 2018)
- Current ranking: No. 1124 (25 June 2018)

Doubles
- Career record: 10–3 (at ATP Tour level, Grand Slam level, and in Davis Cup)
- Career titles: 0
- Highest ranking: No. 1543 (11 June 2018)
- Current ranking: No. 1589 (25 June 2018)

Team competitions
- Davis Cup: 26–13
- Last updated on: 26 June 2018.

Tukhula Jacobs (born 10 December 1994) is a Namibian tennis player.

Jacobs has a career high ATP singles ranking of 1124 achieved on 25 June 2018 and a career high ATP doubles ranking of 1543, achieved on 11 June 2018.

Jacobs has represented Namibia at the Davis Cup, where he has a win-loss record of 26–13.

Jacobs is the brother of tennis player Lesedi Sheya Jacobs.
