= Mozambique Davis Cup team =

National tennis team

Mozambique
- ITF ranking: 104
- First year: 2014
- Years played: 2
- Ties played (W–L): 9 (3–6)
- Best finish: Group III Africa
- Most total wins: Franco Mata (6–7)
- Most singles wins: Franco Mata (5–3)
- Most doubles wins: Ataide Suca (1-1); Jossefa Elias (1-2); Franco Mata (1–4)
- Best doubles team: Jossefa Elias/Hugo Moreira (1-0); Franco Mata/Ataide Suca (1–0)
- Most ties played: Franco Mata (8)
- Most years played: Franco Mata (2); Jossefa Elias (2)

The Mozambique Davis Cup team represents Mozambique in Davis Cup tennis competition and are governed by the Federação Moçambicana de Ténis.

Mozambique currently compete in Africa Zone Group III.

== History ==
Mozambique competed in its first Davis Cup in 2014.

== Current team (2022) ==
- Hercilio Rafael Seda
- Jossefa Simao Elias
- Armando Sigauque
- Jaime Sigauque

== Head to head ==
(by No. of ties)

- vs Algeria 2 ties 0–2
- vs Benin 2 ties 0–2
- vs Botswana 1 tie 1–0
- vs Congo 1 tie 1–0
- vs Libya 1 tie 1–0
- vs Egypt 1 tie 0–1
- vs Namibia 1 tie 0–1

== See also ==
- Davis Cup
- Mozambique Billie Jean King Cup team
