= Alexis Klégou =

Beninese tennis player

Alexis Klegou
- Country (sports): Benin
- Born: 25 January 1989 (age 36) Dunkirk, France
- Height: 1.88 m (6 ft 2 in)
- Plays: Right-handed (two-handed backhand)
- College: Texas A&M University
- Coach: Jorge Aguirre Montes
- Prize money: $30,805

Singles
- Career record: 2–5 (at ATP Tour level, Grand Slam level, and in Davis Cup)
- Career titles: 0; 0 Challenger, 1 Futures
- Highest ranking: No. 633 (16 June 2014)

Doubles
- Career record: 0–2 (at ATP Tour level, Grand Slam level, and in Davis Cup)
- Career titles: 0; 0 Challenger, 6 Futures
- Highest ranking: No. 441 (5 November 2018)

Team competitions
- Davis Cup: 29–16

Alexis Klegou (born 25 January 1989) is a French-born Beninese tennis player. Klegou has a career high ATP singles ranking of No. 633 achieved on 16 June 2014 and a career high ATP doubles ranking of No. 441 achieved on 5 November 2018. Klegou has won one ITF Futures singles title and six ITF Futures doubles titles.

Klegou has represented Benin at the Davis Cup, where he has a W/L record of 29–16.
