= Congo Davis Cup team =

National tennis team

The Congo Davis Cup team represents the Republic of the Congo in Davis Cup tennis competition and are governed by the Fédération Congolaise de Lawn Tennis. They have not competed since 2014.

== History ==
Congo competed in its first Davis Cup in 1991. They have won only one of their 35 ties to date, defeating Ethiopia to finish fourth in their Group III pool in 1995. They did not compete from 1998 until 2009, but returned for the 2010 competition.

== Current team (2022) ==
- Paterne Mamata (Captain-player)
- Armel Mokobo
- Michael Bolidard Ibakakomboyo-Ayessa (Junior player)
- Duhamel Franklin Biboussy

== See also ==
- Davis Cup
- Congo Billie Jean King Cup team
