= Kenya Davis Cup team =

National sports team

The Kenya Davis Cup team represents Kenya in the Davis Cup tennis competition and are governed by the Kenya Lawn Tennis Association.

Kenya currently compete in Africa Zone Group III.

== History ==
Kenya competed in its first Davis Cup in 1975. Their best result was reaching the Euro/African Zone semifinals in 1992, one match shy of the World Group play-offs.

== Current team (2022) ==
- Kael Shalin Shah
- Albert Njogu
- Keean Shah
- Derick Ominde

== See also ==
- Davis Cup
- Kenya Billie Jean King Cup team
