= Cameroon Davis Cup team =

Cameroonian tennis team

The Cameroon Davis Cup team represents Cameroon in Davis Cup tennis competition and are governed by the Fédération Camerounaise de Tennis. Cameroon currently compete in the Europe/Africa Zone of Group IV. Their best result was reaching the African Group II semifinals in 1989.

== History ==
Cameroon competed in its first Davis Cup in 1988. They have not competed since 2000, but are entered in the 2009 competition.

== Current team (2022) ==
- Étienne Teboh
- Lloyd Sergio Watat Njanga
- Boriss Kamdem
- Okala Hagoua Valentin Brayan Alexis
- Cliford Wuyum Nkwain

== See also ==
- Davis Cup
- Cameroon Billie Jean King Cup team
