= Benin Davis Cup team =

National tennis team

The Benin Davis Cup team represents Benin in Davis Cup tennis competition and are governed by the Fédération Beninoise de Lawn Tennis.

Benin currently compete in Africa Zone Group III.

== History ==
Benin competed in its first Davis Cup in 1993. Their best result was 6th place in Group III in 1999.

== Current team (2022) ==
- Alexis Klégou
- Sylvestre Monnou
- Patrick Agbo-Panzo

== See also ==
- Davis Cup
