= Nigeria Davis Cup team =

Nigeria representing team in Davis Cup tennis competition

The Nigeria men's national tennis team represents Nigeria in Davis Cup tennis competition and are governed by the Nigeria Tennis Federation.

Nigeria currently compete in Africa Zone Group III. They reached the Group I semifinals in 1988 and 1989.

== History ==
Nigeria competed in its first Davis Cup in 1974.

== Current team (2022) ==
- Wilson Oswalele Igbinovia
- Nonso Madueke
- Abayomi Oluseyi Philips

== See also ==
- Davis Cup
- Nigeria Billie Jean King Cup team
