= 2001 Davis Cup Europe/Africa Zone Group IV – Zone A =

International tennis competition

The Europe/Africa Zone was one of the three zones of the regional Davis Cup competition in 2001.

In the Europe/Africa Zone there were four different tiers, called groups, in which teams competed against each other to advance to the upper tier. The top two teams in each Group IV sub-zone advanced to the Europe/Africa Zone Group III in 2002. All other teams remained in Group IV.

== Participating nations ==
- Algeria
- Azerbaijan
- Benin
- Burkina Faso
- Cyprus
- Gabon
- Lesotho
- Rwanda
- San Marino
- Sudan
- Tunisia
- Uganda

=== Draw ===
- Venue: Nicosia Tennis Club, Nicosia, Cyprus
- Date: 16–20 May

Group A

	CYP	ALG	BEN	RWA	LES	SUD	RR; W–L	Match; W–L	Set; W–L	Standings
Cyprus		3–0	2–1	3–0	3–0	3–0	5–0	14–1 (93%)	43–13 (77%)	1
Algeria	0–3		3–0	2–1	3–0	3–0	4–1	11–4 (73%)	40–16 (71%)	2
Benin	1–2	0–3		3–0	2–1	3–0	3–2	9–6 (60%)	32–20 (62%)	3
Rwanda	0–3	1–2	0–3		2–1	2–1	2–3	5–10 (33%)	18–33 (35%)	4
Lesotho	0–3	0–3	1–2	1–2		3–0	1–4	5–10 (33%)	17–32 (35%)	5
Sudan	0–3	0–3	0–3	1–2	0–3		0–5	1–14 (7%)	6–42 (13%)	6

Group B

	TUN	AZE	SMR	BUR	GAB	UGA	RR; W–L	Match; W–L	Set; W–L	Standings
Tunisia		2–1	2–1	3–0	3–0	3–0	5–0	13–2 (87%)	44–13 (77%)	1
Azerbaijan	1–2		2–1	2–1	2–1	3–0	4–1	10–5 (67%)	36–24 (60%)	2
San Marino	1–2	1–2		2–1	3–0	3–0	3–2	10–5 (67%)	37–21 (64%)	3
Burkina Faso	0–3	1–2	1–2		3–0	2–1	2–3	7–8 (47%)	25–29 (46%)	4
Gabon	0–3	1–2	0–3	0–3		3–0	1–4	4–11 (27%)	16–37 (30%)	5
Uganda	0–3	0–3	0–3	1–2	0–3		0–5	1–14 (7%)	9–43 (17%)	6

- Cyprus and Tunisia promoted to Group III in 2002.

== Group A ==
=== Benin vs. Sudan ===
Benin
3
Nicosia Tennis Club, Nicosia, Cyprus
16 May 2001

Sudan
0

			1	2	3	4	5
1	(Benin) (Sudan)	Armand Segodo; Mandour Abdalla	4; 1	4; 0	4; 0
2	(Benin) (Sudan)	Arnaud Segodo; Wael El-Sadig	4; 1	4; 2	4; 1
3	(Benin) (Sudan)	Alphonse Gandonou / Paul Segodo; Gaafar Noureldin El-Sadig / Mandour Abdalla	4; 0	4; 2	4; 1

=== Cyprus vs. Algeria ===
Cyprus
3
Nicosia Tennis Club, Nicosia, Cyprus
16 May 2001

Algeria
0

			1	2	3	4	5
1	(Cyprus) (Algeria)	Demetrios Leontis; Noujeim Hakimi	4; 2	2; 4	4; 0	4; 0
2	(Cyprus) (Algeria)	Marcos Baghdatis; Noureddine Mahmoudi	5; 3	4; 1	1; 4	1; 4	4; 2
3	(Cyprus) (Algeria)	Marcos Baghdatis / Demetrios Leontis; Noujeim Hakimi / Abdel-Wahid Henni	4; 0	1; 4	4^{4} 5^{7}	4; 1	4; 1

=== Lesotho vs. Rwanda ===
Lesotho
1
Nicosia Tennis Club, Nicosia, Cyprus
16 May 2001

Rwanda
2

			1	2	3	4	5
1	(Lesotho) (Rwanda)	Lebohang Tsasanyane; Eric Hagenimana	1; 4	2; 4	2; 4
2	(Lesotho) (Rwanda)	Ntsane Moeletsi; Sylvain Rutikanga	5^{7} 4^{4}	2; 4	1; 4	1; 4
3	(Lesotho) (Rwanda)	Sekhoke Moshoeshoe / Mabusetsa Siimane; Alain Hakizimana / Jean-Bosco Ngabonziza	5^{9} 4^{7}	4; 1	4; 1

=== Benin vs. Cyprus ===
Benin
1
Nicosia Tennis Club, Nicosia, Cyprus
17 May 2001

Cyprus
2

			1	2	3	4	5
1	(Benin) (Cyprus)	Armand Segodo; Demetrios Leontis	1; 4	3; 5	4^{2} 5^{7}
2	(Benin) (Cyprus)	Arnaud Segodo; Marcos Baghdatis	5; 3	4^{7} 5^{9}	4; 2	1; 4	2; 4
3	(Benin) (Cyprus)	Alphonse Gandonou / Paul Segodo; George Kalanov / Photos Kallias	4; 2	1; 4	4; 2	4; 1

=== Lesotho vs. Algeria ===
Lesotho
0
Nicosia Tennis Club, Nicosia, Cyprus
17 May 2001

Algeria
3

			1	2	3	4	5
1	(Lesotho) (Algeria)	Mabusetsa Siimane; Abdel-Wahid Henni	0; 4	0; 4	0; 4
2	(Lesotho) (Algeria)	Ntsane Moeletsi; Noureddine Mahmoudi	2; 4	0; 4	2; 4
3	(Lesotho) (Algeria)	Ntsane Moeletsi / Lebohang Tsasanyane; Noujeim Hakimi / Noureddine Mahmoudi	3; 5	0; 4	0; 4

=== Rwanda vs. Sudan ===
Rwanda
2
Nicosia Tennis Club, Nicosia, Cyprus
17 May 2001

Sudan
1

			1	2	3	4	5
1	(Rwanda) (Sudan)	Alain Hakizimana; Gaafar Noureldin El-Sadig	5^{7} 4^{3}	4; 1	4; 2
2	(Rwanda) (Sudan)	Sylvain Rutikanga; Wael El-Sadig	5^{7} 4^{4}	5; 3	4; 1
3	(Rwanda) (Sudan)	Eric Hagenimana / Jean-Bosco Ngabonziza; Mandour Abdalla / Wael El-Sadig	2; 4	2; 4	2; 4

=== Benin vs. Rwanda ===
Benin
3
Nicosia Tennis Club, Nicosia, Cyprus
18 May 2001

Rwanda
0

			1	2	3	4	5
1	(Benin) (Rwanda)	Armand Segodo; Eric Hagenimana	4; 0	4; 1	4; 1
2	(Benin) (Rwanda)	Arnaud Segodo; Sylvain Rutikanga	4; 0	4; 1	4; 2
3	(Benin) (Rwanda)	Alphonse Gandonou / Arnaud Segodo; Alain Hakizimana / Sylvain Rutikanga	2; 4	4; 1	4; 2	5^{7} 4^{4}

=== Cyprus vs. Lesotho ===
Cyprus
3
Nicosia Tennis Club, Nicosia, Cyprus
18 May 2001

Lesotho
0

			1	2	3	4	5
1	(Cyprus) (Lesotho)	Demetrios Leontis; Lebohang Tsasanyane	4; 0	4; 0	4; 0
2	(Cyprus) (Lesotho)	Marcos Baghdatis; Ntsane Moeletsi	4; 1	4; 0	4; 1
3	(Cyprus) (Lesotho)	George Kalanov / Photos Kallias; Sekhoke Moshoeshoe / Mabusetsa Siimane	4; 1	2; 4	4; 2	5^{11} 4^{9}

=== Algeria vs. Sudan ===
Algeria
3
Nicosia Tennis Club, Nicosia, Cyprus
18 May 2001

Sudan
0

			1	2	3	4	5
1	(Algeria) (Sudan)	Abdel-Wahid Henni; Gaafar Noureldin El-Sadig	4; 0	4; 2	5; 3
2	(Algeria) (Sudan)	Noureddine Mahmoudi; Mandour Abdalla	4; 0	4; 2	4; 2
3	(Algeria) (Sudan)	Noujeim Hakimi / Abdel-Wahid Henni; Gaafar Noureldin El-Sadig / Mandour Abdalla	5^{7} 4^{4}	4; 0	5^{7} 4^{4}

=== Benin vs. Algeria ===
Benin
0
Nicosia Tennis Club, Nicosia, Cyprus
19 May 2001

Algeria
3

			1	2	3	4	5
1	(Benin) (Algeria)	Armand Segodo; Abdel-Wahid Henni	5^{7} 4^{3}	4; 1	1; 4	2; 4	1; 4
2	(Benin) (Algeria)	Arnaud Segodo; Noureddine Mahmoudi	3; 5	2; 4	4; 1	2; 4
3	(Benin) (Algeria)	Alphonse Gandonou / Arnaud Segodo; Noujeim Hakimi / Noureddine Mahmoudi	2; 4	2; 4	2; 4

=== Cyprus vs. Rwanda ===
Cyprus
3
Nicosia Tennis Club, Nicosia, Cyprus
19 May 2001

Rwanda
0

			1	2	3	4	5
1	(Cyprus) (Rwanda)	Demetrios Leontis; Eric Hagenimana	5; 3	2; 4	4; 1	5^{7} 4^{1}
2	(Cyprus) (Rwanda)	Marcos Baghdatis; Alain Hakizimana	4; 1	4; 1	4; 0
3	(Cyprus) (Rwanda)	George Kalanov / Photos Kallias; Alain Hakizimana / Sylvain Rutikanga	4; 1	4; 0	5^{8} 4^{6}

=== Lesotho vs. Sudan ===
Lesotho
3
Nicosia Tennis Club, Nicosia, Cyprus
19 May 2001

Sudan
0

			1	2	3	4	5
1	(Lesotho) (Sudan)	Mabusetsa Siimane; Mandour Abdalla	4; 0	5; 3	4; 0
2	(Lesotho) (Sudan)	Ntsane Moeletsi; Wael El-Sadig	4; 2	4; 1	4^{4} 5^{7}	4^{6} 5^{8}	4; 2
3	(Lesotho) (Sudan)	Sekhoke Moshoeshoe / Mabusetsa Siimane; Gaafar Noureldin El-Sadig / Mandour Abdalla	4; 2	4; 2	5^{7} 4^{3}

=== Benin vs. Lesotho ===
Benin
2
Nicosia Tennis Club, Nicosia, Cyprus
20 May 2001

Lesotho
1

			1	2	3	4	5
1	(Benin) (Lesotho)	Armand Segodo; Lebohang Tsasanyane	4; 0	4; 1	5; 3
2	(Benin) (Lesotho)	Arnaud Segodo; Ntsane Moeletsi	4; 1	4; 2	4; 0
3	(Benin) (Lesotho)	Alphonse Gandonou / Paul Segodo; Sekhoke Moshoeshoe / Mabusetsa Siimane	3; 5	4^{3} 5^{7}	1; 4

=== Cyprus vs. Sudan ===
Cyprus
3
Nicosia Tennis Club, Nicosia, Cyprus
20 May 2001

Sudan
0

			1	2	3	4	5
1	(Cyprus) (Sudan)	Demetrios Leontis; Gaafar Noureldin El-Sadig	4; 1	4; 2	4; 1
2	(Cyprus) (Sudan)	Marcos Baghdatis; Wael El-Sadig	4; 1	4; 1	4; 1
3	(Cyprus) (Sudan)	George Kalanov / Photos Kallias; Gaafar Noureldin El-Sadig / Mandour Abdalla	2; 4	5^{7} 4^{3}	5; 3	4; 2

=== Rwanda vs. Algeria ===
Rwanda
1
Nicosia Tennis Club, Nicosia, Cyprus
20 May 2001

Algeria
2

			1	2	3	4	5
1	(Rwanda) (Algeria)	Eric Hagenimana; Abdel-Wahid Henni	4; 1	4; 2	1; 4	1; 4	4; 1
2	(Rwanda) (Algeria)	Sylvain Rutikanga; Noureddine Mahmoudi	1; 4	0; 4	1; 4
3	(Rwanda) (Algeria)	Eric Hagenimana / Sylvain Rutikanga; Noujeim Hakimi / Noureddine Mahmoudi	4; 2	4^{3} 5^{7}	0; 4	0; 4

== Group B ==
=== Tunisia vs. Azerbaijan ===
Tunisia
2
Nicosia Tennis Club, Nicosia, Cyprus
16 May 2001

Azerbaijan
1

			1	2	3	4	5
1	(Tunisia) (Azerbaijan)	Haythem Abid; Nidjat Ramazanov	4; 0	4; 0	4; 1
2	(Tunisia) (Azerbaijan)	Walid Jallali; Emin Ağayev	1; 4	1; 4	2; 4
3	(Tunisia) (Azerbaijan)	Walid Jallali / Chekib Jemai; Emin Ağayev / Farid Shirinov	1; 4	4^{8} 5^{10}	4; 1	4; 0	4; 2

=== San Marino vs. Gabon ===
San Marino
3
Nicosia Tennis Club, Nicosia, Cyprus
16 May 2001

Gabon
0

			1	2	3	4	5
1	(San Marino) (Gabon)	William Forcellini; Nguemah Oyone-Meye	4; 0	4; 2	5; 3
2	(San Marino) (Gabon)	Domenico Vicini; Christophe Couprie	4; 2	4; 1	5; 3
3	(San Marino) (Gabon)	Christian Rosti / Domenico Vicini; Christophe Couprie / Nguemah Oyone-Meye	2; 4	4; 2	4; 2	1; 4	4; 1

=== Uganda vs. Burkina Faso ===
Uganda
1
Nicosia Tennis Club, Nicosia, Cyprus
16 May 2001

Burkina Faso
2

			1	2	3	4	5
1	(Uganda) (Burkina Faso)	Charles Yokwe; Mamadou Kaboré	0; 4	4; 1	5^{7} 4^{1}	4; 2
2	(Uganda) (Burkina Faso)	Christopher Bagala; Sansan Dabiré	1; 4	0; 4	3; 5
3	(Uganda) (Burkina Faso)	James Odongo / Charles Yokwe; Sansan Dabiré / Mamadou Kaboré	4; 2	2; 4	0; 4	0; 4

=== Tunisia vs. San Marino ===
Tunisia
2
Nicosia Tennis Club, Nicosia, Cyprus
17 May 2001

San Marino
1

			1	2	3	4	5
1	(Tunisia) (San Marino)	Haythem Abid; Christian Rosti	4; 0	4; 1	4; 0
2	(Tunisia) (San Marino)	Walid Jallali; Domenico Vicini	1; 4	5; 3	4; 2	4^{7} 5^{9}	5; 3
3	(Tunisia) (San Marino)	Chekib Jemai / Fares Zaier; William Forcellini / Giovanni Vicini	2; 4	5^{7} 4^{2}	4^{1} 5^{7}	4; 1	6; 8

=== Uganda vs. Gabon ===
Uganda
0
Nicosia Tennis Club, Nicosia, Cyprus
17 May 2001

Gabon
3

			1	2	3	4	5
1	(Uganda) (Gabon)	Charles Yokwe; Alain Manfoumbi	2; 4	1; 4	4; 2	2; 4
2	(Uganda) (Gabon)	Christopher Bagala; Christophe Couprie	4; 2	1; 4	1; 4	4; 2	0; 4
3	(Uganda) (Gabon)	James Odongo / Ronald Senyanja; Alain Manfoumbi / Nguemah Oyone-Meye	1; 4	1; 4	2; 4

=== Burkina Faso vs. Azerbaijan ===
Burkina Faso
1
Nicosia Tennis Club, Nicosia, Cyprus
17 May 2001

Azerbaijan
2

			1	2	3	4	5
1	(Burkina Faso) (Azerbaijan)	Sylvain Nikiema; Farid Shirinov	1; 4	4; 1	4^{3} 5^{7}	2; 4
2	(Burkina Faso) (Azerbaijan)	Sansan Dabiré; Emin Ağayev	0; 4	1; 4	2; 4
3	(Burkina Faso) (Azerbaijan)	Sansan Dabiré / Saydou Ouedraogo; Emin Ağayev / Nidjat Ramazanov	4^{8} 5^{10}	5; 3	3; 5	5; 3	4; 1

=== Tunisia vs. Burkina Faso ===
Tunisia
3
Nicosia Tennis Club, Nicosia, Cyprus
18 May 2001

Burkina Faso
0

			1	2	3	4	5
1	(Tunisia) (Burkina Faso)	Haythem Abid; Mamadou Kaboré	4; 1	4; 1	4; 1
2	(Tunisia) (Burkina Faso)	Chekib Jemai; Sansan Dabiré	4; 1	4; 2	4; 2
3	(Tunisia) (Burkina Faso)	Walid Jallali / Chekib Jemai; Sansan Dabiré / Saydou Ouedraogo	2; 4	4; 1	4; 0	0; 4	4; 1

=== San Marino vs. Uganda ===
San Marino
3
Nicosia Tennis Club, Nicosia, Cyprus
18 May 2001

Uganda
0

			1	2	3	4	5
1	(San Marino) (Uganda)	William Forcellini; Charles Yokwe	4; 1	4; 0	4; 1
2	(San Marino) (Uganda)	Domenico Vicini; Christopher Bagala	4; 1	4; 2	4; 0
3	(San Marino) (Uganda)	Christian Rosti / Giovanni Vicini; James Odongo / Ronald Senyanja	4; 1	4^{4} 5^{7}	4; 2	4; 1

=== Gabon vs. Azerbaijan ===
Gabon
1
Nicosia Tennis Club, Nicosia, Cyprus
18 May 2001

Azerbaijan
2

			1	2	3	4	5
1	(Gabon) (Azerbaijan)	Alain Manfoumbi; Taigat Rahimov	4; 2	5; 3	2; 4	4; 1
2	(Gabon) (Azerbaijan)	Nguemah Oyone-Meye; Emin Ağayev	0; 4	0; 4	0; 4
3	(Gabon) (Azerbaijan)	Alain Manfoumbi / Nguemah Oyone-Meye; Emin Ağayev / Farid Shirinov	4^{5} 5^{7}	1; 4	2; 4

=== Tunisia vs. Gabon ===
Tunisia
3
Nicosia Tennis Club, Nicosia, Cyprus
19 May 2001

Gabon
0

			1	2	3	4	5
1	(Tunisia) (Gabon)	Haythem Abid; Alain Manfoumbi	4; 2	4; 2	4^{1} 5^{7}	4; 0
2	(Tunisia) (Gabon)	Walid Jallali; Christophe Couprie	4; 2	4; 0	4; 1
3	(Tunisia) (Gabon)	Chekib Jemai / Fares Zaier; Christophe Couprie / Alain Manfoumbi	4; 2	4; 2	4; 2

=== San Marino vs. Burkina Faso ===
San Marino
2
Nicosia Tennis Club, Nicosia, Cyprus
19 May 2001

Burkina Faso
1

			1	2	3	4	5
1	(San Marino) (Burkina Faso)	Christian Rosti; Saydou Ouedraogo	5; 3	4; 0	4; 2
2	(San Marino) (Burkina Faso)	Domenico Vicini; Mamadou Kaboré	4; 0	4; 0	4; 0
3	(San Marino) (Burkina Faso)	William Forcellini / Giovanni Vicini; Sansan Dabiré / Mamadou Kaboré	4^{1} 5^{7}	4; 1	4^{1} 5^{7}	2; 4

=== Uganda vs. Azerbaijan ===
Uganda
0
Nicosia Tennis Club, Nicosia, Cyprus
19 May 2001

Azerbaijan
3

			1	2	3	4	5
1	(Uganda) (Azerbaijan)	Charles Yokwe; Farid Shirinov	2; 4	0; 4	0; 4
2	(Uganda) (Azerbaijan)	Christopher Bagala; Emin Ağayev	1; 4	0; 4	0; 4
3	(Uganda) (Azerbaijan)	James Odongo / Ronald Senyanja; Nidjat Ramazanov / Farid Shirinov	5; 3	0; 4	4^{5} 5^{7}	4^{3} 5^{7}

=== Tunisia vs. Uganda ===
Tunisia
3
Nicosia Tennis Club, Nicosia, Cyprus
20 May 2001

Uganda
0

			1	2	3	4	5
1	(Tunisia) (Uganda)	Chekib Jemai; James Odongo	4; 1	4; 0	4; 0
2	(Tunisia) (Uganda)	Walid Jallali; Ronald Senyanja	4; 1	4; 1	4; 0
3	(Tunisia) (Uganda)	Haythem Abid / Fares Zaier; James Odongo / Ronald Senyanja	4; 2	4; 0	4; 2

=== San Marino vs. Azerbaijan ===
San Marino
1
Nicosia Tennis Club, Nicosia, Cyprus
20 May 2001

Azerbaijan
2

			1	2	3	4	5
1	(San Marino) (Azerbaijan)	Christian Rosti; Farid Shirinov	0; 4	4; 2	5; 3	4; 1
2	(San Marino) (Azerbaijan)	Domenico Vicini; Emin Ağayev	5^{7} 4^{3}	4; 2	1; 4	2; 4	2; 4
3	(San Marino) (Azerbaijan)	Christian Rosti / Domenico Vicini; Emin Ağayev / Farid Shirinov	4; 1	5^{7} 4^{4}	4^{3} 5^{7}	4; 5	1; 4

=== Burkina Faso vs. Gabon ===
Burkina Faso
3
Nicosia Tennis Club, Nicosia, Cyprus
20 May 2001

Gabon
0

			1	2	3	4	5
1	(Burkina Faso) (Gabon)	Mamadou Kaboré; Kryce-Didier Momo-Kassa	4; 1	4; 1	4; 0
2	(Burkina Faso) (Gabon)	Sansan Dabiré; Nguemah Oyone-Meye	1; 4	4; 1	4; 1	5; 3
3	(Burkina Faso) (Gabon)	Sansan Dabiré / Mamadou Kaboré; Kryce-Didier Momo-Kassa / Nguemah Oyone-Meye	4; 0	4; 2	4; 1
