= 2000 Davis Cup Europe/Africa Zone Group IV – Zone B =

International tennis competition

The Europe/Africa Zone was one of the three zones of the regional Davis Cup competition in 2000.

In the Europe/Africa Zone there were four different tiers, called groups, in which teams competed against each other to advance to the upper tier. The top two teams in Group IV advanced to the Europe/Africa Zone Group III in 2001. All other teams remained in Group IV.

== Participating nations ==
- Algeria
- Andorra
- Azerbaijan
- Cameroon
- Ghana
- Liechtenstein
- Mauritius
- Sudan

=== Draw ===
- Venue: Accra Sports Stadium, Accra, Ghana
- Date: 14–20 February

Group A

	ALG	AND	LIE	SUD	RR; W–L	Match; W–L	Set; W–L	Standings
Algeria		2–1	3–0	3–0	3–0	8–1 (89%)	16–4 (80%)	1
Andorra	1–2		3–0	3–0	2–1	7–2 (78%)	16–4 (80%)	2
Liechtenstein	0–3	0–3		2–1	1–2	2–7 (22%)	4–15 (21%)	3
Sudan	0–3	0–3	1–2		0–3	1–8 (11%)	3–16 (16%)	4

Group B

	GHA	MRI	CMR	AZE	RR; W–L	Match; W–L	Set; W–L	Standings
Ghana		2–1	3–0	3–0	3–0	8–1 (89%)	16–3 (84%)	1
Mauritius	1–2		3–0	2–1	2–1	6–3 (67%)	14–6 (70%)	2
Cameroon	0–3	0–3		3–0	1–2	3–6 (33%)	6–12 (33%)	3
Azerbaijan	0–3	1–2	0–3		0–3	1–8 (11%)	2–17 (11%)	4

1st to 4th place play-offs

3rd-4th Play-off
A1	Algeria	1
A2	Andorra	2

Semifinals
A1	Algeria	1
B2	Mauritius	2
A2	Andorra	0
B1	Ghana	3

Final
B2	Mauritius	0
B1	Ghana	3

5th to 8th place play-offs

7th-8th Play-off
A3	Liechtenstein	3
A4	Sudan	0

5th-8th Play-offs
A3	Liechtenstein	1
B4	Azerbaijan	2
A4	Sudan	0
B3	Cameroon	3

5th-6th Play-off
B4	Azerbaijan	1
B3	Cameroon	2

=== Final standings ===
Rank	Team
1	Ghana
2	Mauritius
3	Andorra
4	Algeria
5	Cameroon
6	Azerbaijan
7	Liechtenstein
8	Sudan

- Ghana and Mauritius promoted to Group III in 2001.

== Round robin ==
=== Group A ===
==== Algeria vs. Andorra ====
Algeria
2
Accra Sports Stadium, Accra, Ghana
14 February 2000

Andorra
1

			1	2	3
1	(Algeria) (Andorra)	Noureddine Mahmoudi; Kenneth Tuilier-Curco	2; 6	7; 5	6; 3
2	(Algeria) (Andorra)	Abdelhak Hameurlaine; Joan Jiménez Guerra	1; 6	6; 2	6; 3
3	(Algeria) (Andorra)	Sid-Ali Akkal / Abdel-Wahid Henni; Jean-Baptiste Poux-Gautier / Kenneth Tuilier-Curco	1; 6	1; 6

==== Algeria vs. Liechtenstein ====
Algeria
3
Accra Sports Stadium, Accra, Ghana
16 February 2000

Liechtenstein
0

			1	2	3
1	(Algeria) (Liechtenstein)	Noureddine Mahmoudi; Andreas Schweiger	6; 1	6; 0
2	(Algeria) (Liechtenstein)	Abdelhak Hameurlaine; Alex Risch	6; 3	6; 0
3	(Algeria) (Liechtenstein)	Sid-Ali Akkal / Abdel-Wahid Henni; Kenny Banzer / Wolfgang Strub	6; 0	6; 3

==== Andorra vs. Sudan ====
Andorra
3
Accra Sports Stadium, Accra, Ghana
17 February 2000

Sudan
0

			1	2	3
1	(Andorra) (Sudan)	Jean-Baptiste Poux-Gautier; Mandour Abdalla	6; 0	6; 1
2	(Andorra) (Sudan)	Joan Jiménez Guerra; Gaafar Noureldin El-Sadig	6; 0	6; 1
3	(Andorra) (Sudan)	Joan Jiménez Guerra / Jean-Baptiste Poux-Gautier; Gaafar Noureldin El-Sadig / Wael Noureldin	6; 0	6; 1

==== Algeria vs. Sudan ====
Algeria
3
Accra Sports Stadium, Accra, Ghana
17 February 2000

Sudan
0

			1	2	3
1	(Algeria) (Sudan)	Noureddine Mahmoudi; Mandour Abdalla	6; 2	6; 2
2	(Algeria) (Sudan)	Abdelhak Hameurlaine; Gaafar Noureldin El-Sadig	6; 1	6; 0
3	(Algeria) (Sudan)	Sid-Ali Akkal / Abdel-Wahid Henni; Gaafar Noureldin El-Sadig / Wael Noureldin	7^{7} 6^{2}	6; 0

==== Andorra vs. Liechtenstein ====
Andorra
3
Accra Sports Stadium, Accra, Ghana
17 February 2000

Liechtenstein
0

			1	2	3
1	(Andorra) (Liechtenstein)	Jean-Baptiste Poux-Gautier; Andreas Schweiger	6; 0	6; 0
2	(Andorra) (Liechtenstein)	Joan Jiménez Guerra; Alex Risch	6; 0	6; 0
3	(Andorra) (Liechtenstein)	Joan Jiménez Guerra / Kenneth Tuilier-Curco; Kenny Banzer / Wolfgang Strub	6; 1	6; 0

==== Liechtenstein vs. Sudan ====
Liechtenstein
2
Accra Sports Stadium, Accra, Ghana
18 February 2000

Sudan
1

			1	2	3
1	(Liechtenstein) (Sudan)	Andreas Schweiger; Mandour Abdalla	4; 6	6; 3	7; 5
2	(Liechtenstein) (Sudan)	Alex Risch; Gaafar Noureldin El-Sadig	6; 2	6; 3
3	(Liechtenstein) (Sudan)	Kenny Banzer / Wolfgang Strub; Gaafar Noureldin El-Sadig / Wael Noureldin	1; 6	3; 6

=== Group B ===
==== Ghana vs. Azerbaijan ====
Ghana
3
Accra Sports Stadium, Accra, Ghana
16 February 2000

Azerbaijan
0

			1	2	3
1	(Ghana) (Azerbaijan)	Franklyn Ofori; Nidjat Ramazanov	6; 1	6; 1
2	(Ghana) (Azerbaijan)	Gunther Darkey; Emin Ağayev	7^{7} 6^{1}	6; 4
3	(Ghana) (Azerbaijan)	Courage Anyidoho / Franklyn Ofori; Taigat Rahimov / Farid Shirinov	6; 1	6; 1

==== Mauritius vs. Cameroon ====
Mauritius
3
Accra Sports Stadium, Accra, Ghana
16 February 2000

Cameroon
0

			1	2	3
1	(Mauritius) (Cameroon)	Jean-Marcel Bourgault du Coudray; Pierre Otolo-Metomo	6; 1	6; 4
2	(Mauritius) (Cameroon)	Kamil Patel; Lionel Kemajou	6; 3	6; 3
3	(Mauritius) (Cameroon)	Jean-Marcel Bourgault du Coudray / Kamil Patel; Luc Ondobo / Pierre Otolo-Metomo	6; 2	6; 1

==== Ghana vs. Mauritius ====
Ghana
2
Accra Sports Stadium, Accra, Ghana
17 February 2000

Mauritius
1

			1	2	3
1	(Ghana) (Mauritius)	Franklyn Ofori; Jean-Marcel Bourgault du Coudray	6; 4	6; 4
2	(Ghana) (Mauritius)	Gunther Darkey; Kamil Patel	4; 6	7^{7} 6^{3}	6; 2
3	(Ghana) (Mauritius)	Courage Anyidoho / Thomas Debrah; Jean-Marcel Bourgault du Coudray / Kamil Patel	2; 6	6^{6} 7^{8}

==== Azerbaijan vs. Cameroon ====
Azerbaijan
0
Accra Sports Stadium, Accra, Ghana
17 February 2000

Cameroon
3

			1	2	3
1	(Azerbaijan) (Cameroon)	Nidjat Ramazanov; Pierre Otolo-Metomo	1; 6	2; 6
2	(Azerbaijan) (Cameroon)	Emin Ağayev; Lionel Kemajou	4; 6	1; 6
3	(Azerbaijan) (Cameroon)	Taigat Rahimov / Farid Shirinov; Alifa Adoum / Lionel Kemajou	0; 6	1; 6

==== Ghana vs. Cameroon ====
Ghana
3
Accra Sports Stadium, Accra, Ghana
18 February 2000

Cameroon
0

			1	2	3
1	(Ghana) (Cameroon)	Franklyn Ofori; Pierre Otolo-Metomo	7; 5	7^{7} 6^{3}
2	(Ghana) (Cameroon)	Gunther Darkey; Lionel Kemajou	7^{7} 6^{2}	7; 5
3	(Ghana) (Cameroon)	Gunther Darkey / Franklyn Ofori; Alifa Adoum / Pierre Otolo-Metomo	6; 2	6; 4

==== Azerbaijan vs. Mauritius ====
Azerbaijan
1
Accra Sports Stadium, Accra, Ghana
18 February 2000

Mauritius
2

			1	2	3
1	(Azerbaijan) (Mauritius)	Nidjat Ramazanov; Jean-Marcel Bourgault du Coudray	2; 6	0; 6
2	(Azerbaijan) (Mauritius)	Emin Ağayev; Kamil Patel	6^{8} 7^{10}	7; 5	6; 4
3	(Azerbaijan) (Mauritius)	Emin Ağayev / Nidjat Ramazanov; Jean-Marcel Bourgault du Coudray / Jonathan Vencatachellum	3; 6	3; 6

== 1st to 4th place play-offs ==
=== Semifinals ===
==== Mauritius vs. Algeria ====
Mauritius
2
Accra Sports Stadium, Accra, Ghana
19 February 2000

Algeria
1

			1	2	3
1	(Mauritius) (Algeria)	Jean-Marcel Bourgault du Coudray; Noureddine Mahmoudi	6; 4	6; 1
2	(Mauritius) (Algeria)	Kamil Patel; Abdelhak Hameurlaine	7^{7} 6^{3}	3; 6	1; 6
3	(Mauritius) (Algeria)	Jean-Marcel Bourgault du Coudray / Kamil Patel; Abdelhak Hameurlaine / Noureddine Mahmoudi	6; 3	6; 1

==== Ghana vs. Andorra ====
Ghana
3
Accra Sports Stadium, Accra, Ghana
19 February 2000

Andorra
0

			1	2	3
1	(Ghana) (Andorra)	Franklyn Ofori; Jean-Baptiste Poux-Gautier	7^{7} 6^{3}	6; 3
2	(Ghana) (Andorra)	Gunther Darkey; Joan Jiménez Guerra	6; 2	6; 4
3	(Ghana) (Andorra)	Courage Anyidoho / Thomas Debrah; Jean-Baptiste Poux-Gautier / Kenneth Tuilier-Curco	6; 3	6; 3

=== Final ===
==== Mauritius vs. Ghana ====
Mauritius
0
Accra Sports Stadium, Accra, Ghana
20 February 2000

Ghana
3

			1	2	3
1	(Mauritius) (Ghana)	Jonathan Vencatachellum; Thomas Debrah	3; 6	1; 6
2	(Mauritius) (Ghana)	Jean-Marcel Bourgault du Coudray; Courage Anyidoho	6; 4	6^{9} 7^{11}	3; 6
3	(Mauritius) (Ghana)	Wong-Kee Chuan / Jonathan Vencatachellum; Courage Anyidoho / Gunther Darkey	0; 6	2; 6

=== 3rd to 4th play-off ===
==== Algeria vs. Andorra ====
Algeria
1
Accra Sports Stadium, Accra, Ghana
20 February 2000

Andorra
2

			1	2	3
1	(Algeria) (Andorra)	Sid-Ali Akkal; Kenneth Tuilier-Curco	6; 3	2; 6	1; 6
2	(Algeria) (Andorra)	Noureddine Mahmoudi; Jean-Baptiste Poux-Gautier	4; 6	7^{7} 6^{3}	6; 4
3	(Algeria) (Andorra)	Abdelhak Hameurlaine / Abdel-Wahid Henni; Joan Jiménez Guerra / Kenneth Tuilier-Curco	4; 6	1; 6

== 5th to 8th place play-offs ==
=== 5th to 8th play-offs ===
==== Liechtenstein vs. Azerbaijan ====
Liechtenstein
1
Accra Sports Stadium, Accra, Ghana
19 February 2000

Azerbaijan
2

			1	2	3
1	(Liechtenstein) (Azerbaijan)	Andreas Schweiger; Nidjat Ramazanov	1; 6	6; 2	1; 6
2	(Liechtenstein) (Azerbaijan)	Alex Risch; Emin Ağayev	1; 6	6; 4	1; 6
3	(Liechtenstein) (Azerbaijan)	Kenny Banzer / Andreas Schweiger; Taigat Rahimov / Farid Shirinov	6; 4	6; 3

==== Cameroon vs. Sudan ====
Cameroon
3
Accra Sports Stadium, Accra, Ghana
19 February 2000

Sudan
0

			1	2	3
1	(Cameroon) (Sudan)	Alifa Adoum; Wael Noureldin	6; 4	6; 3
2	(Cameroon) (Sudan)	Luc Ondobo; Gaafar Noureldin El-Sadig	6; 3	0; 6	10; 8
3	(Cameroon) (Sudan)	Alifa Adoum / Luc Ondobo; Gaafar Noureldin El-Sadig / Wael Noureldin	6; 4	6; 4

=== 5th to 6th play-off ===
==== Azerbaijan vs. Cameroon ====
Azerbaijan
1
Accra Sports Stadium, Accra, Ghana
20 February 2000

Cameroon
2

			1	2	3
1	(Azerbaijan) (Cameroon)	Nidjat Ramazanov; Pierre Otolo-Metomo	6^{2} 7^{7}	1; 6
2	(Azerbaijan) (Cameroon)	Emin Ağayev; Lionel Kemajou	6; 4	6; 3
3	(Azerbaijan) (Cameroon)	Nidjat Ramazanov / Farid Shirinov; Alifa Adoum / Pierre Otolo-Metomo	3; 6	2; 6

=== 7th to 8th play-off ===
==== Liechtenstein vs. Sudan ====
Liechtenstein
3
Accra Sports Stadium, Accra, Ghana
20 February 2000

Sudan
0

			1	2	3
1	(Liechtenstein) (Sudan)	Andreas Schweiger; Wael Noureldin	1; 6	6; 1	13; 11
2	(Liechtenstein) (Sudan)	Alex Risch; Gaafar Noureldin El-Sadig	6; 0	6; 0
3	(Liechtenstein) (Sudan)	Kenny Banzer / Alex Risch; Gaafar Noureldin El-Sadig / Abdullah Giha	7^{7} 6^{5}	7^{7} 6^{1}
