= 1995 Davis Cup Europe/Africa Zone Group III – Zone B =

International tennis competition

Zone B of the 1995 Davis Cup Europe/Africa Group III was one of two zones in the Europe/Africa Group III of the 1995 Davis Cup. 10 teams competed across two pools in a round robin competition, with the top team in each pool advancing to Group II in 1996.

== Participating nations ==
- Algeria
- Congo
- Cyprus
- Ethiopia
- Kenya
- Malta
- Senegal
- Sudan
- Turkey
- Zambia

=== Draw ===
- Venue: Tennis Club de Brazzaville, Brazzaville, Congo
- Date: 26–30 April

Group A

	MLT	CYP	KEN	CGO	ETH	RR; W–L	Match; W–L	Set; W–L	Standings
Malta		2–1	3–0	2–1	2–1	4–0	9–3 (75%)	19–9 (68%)	1
Cyprus	1–2		2–1	3–0	3–0	3–1	9–3 (75%)	19–7 (73%)	2
Kenya	0–3	1–2		2–1	3–0	2–2	6–6 (50%)	15–14 (52%)	3
Congo	1–2	0–3	1–2		2–1	1–3	4–8 (33%)	9–18 (33%)	4
Ethiopia	1–2	0–3	0–3	1–2		0–4	2–10 (17%)	7–21 (25%)	5

Group B

	ALG	TUR	ZAM	SEN	SUD	RR; W–L	Match; W–L	Set; W–L	Standings
Algeria		3–0	3–0	2–1	3–0	4–0	11–1 (92%)	22–3 (88%)	1
Turkey	0–3		2–1	2–1	3–0	3–1	7–5 (58%)	14–10 (58%)	2
Zambia	0–3	1–2		2–1	3–0	2–2	6–6 (50%)	12–13 (48%)	3
Senegal	1–2	1–2	1–2		3–0	1–3	6–6 (50%)	14–12 (54%)	4
Sudan	0–3	0–3	0–3	0–3		0–4	0–12 (0%)	0–24 (0%)	5

- Malta and Algeria promoted to Group II in 1996.

== Group A ==
=== Congo vs. Cyprus ===
Congo
0
Tennis Club de Brazzaville, Brazzaville, Congo
26 April 1995

Cyprus
3

			1	2	3
1	(Republic of the Congo) (Cyprus)	Nydiaye Daouda; Demetrios Leontis	1; 6	3; 6
2	(Republic of the Congo) (Cyprus)	Alain Bemba; Alkis Papamichael	3; 6	2; 6
3	(Republic of the Congo) (Cyprus)	Martial Banguid / Nydiaye Daouda; Loucas Christophides / Neoclis Neocleous	1; 6	4; 6

=== Ethiopia vs. Kenya ===
Ethiopia
0
Tennis Club de Brazzaville, Brazzaville, Congo
26 April 1995

Kenya
3

			1	2	3
1	(Ethiopia) (Kenya)	Mikaile Asfaw; Norbert Oduor	1; 6	0; 6
2	(Ethiopia) (Kenya)	Habtamu Gebrekidan; Allan Cooper	6; 4	1; 6	1; 6
3	(Ethiopia) (Kenya)	Bogale Mengsha / Yohannes Setegnwandimu; Balaraman Arun / Norbert Oduor	3; 6	1; 6

=== Cyprus vs. Ethiopia ===
Cyprus
3
Tennis Club de Brazzaville, Brazzaville, Congo
27 April 1995

Ethiopia
0

			1	2	3
1	(Cyprus) (Ethiopia)	Demetrios Leontis; Habtamu Gebrekidan	7; 5	6; 1
2	(Cyprus) (Ethiopia)	Alkis Papamichael; Yohannes Setegnwandimu	6; 0	6; 2
3	(Cyprus) (Ethiopia)	Loucas Christophides / Neoclis Neocleous; Bogale Mengsha / Mikaile Asfaw	6; 1	6; 1

=== Kenya vs. Malta ===
Kenya
0
Tennis Club de Brazzaville, Brazzaville, Congo
27 April 1995

Malta
3

			1	2	3
1	(Kenya) (Malta)	Norbert Oduor; Mark Schembri	6; 3	2; 6	4; 6
2	(Kenya) (Malta)	Allan Cooper; Gordon Asciak	5; 7	3; 6
3	(Kenya) (Malta)	Balaraman Arun / Devin Shretta; Gordon Asciak / Mark Schembri	7; 5	1; 6	2; 6

=== Congo vs. Malta ===
Congo
1
Tennis Club de Brazzaville, Brazzaville, Congo
28 April 1995

Malta
2

			1	2	3
1	(Republic of the Congo) (Malta)	Nydiaye Daouda; Marco Cappello	3; 6	6; 3	6; 3
2	(Republic of the Congo) (Malta)	Christian Bemba; Gordon Asciak	2; 6	4; 6
3	(Republic of the Congo) (Malta)	Alain Bemba / Christian Bemba; Gordon Asciak / Mark Schembri	2; 6	0; 6

=== Cyprus vs. Kenya ===
Cyprus
2
Tennis Club de Brazzaville, Brazzaville, Congo
28 April 1995

Kenya
1

			1	2	3
1	(Cyprus) (Kenya)	Demetrios Leontis; Balaraman Arun	6; 3	6; 0
2	(Cyprus) (Kenya)	Alkis Papamichael; Allan Cooper	6; 3	0; 6	3; 6
3	(Cyprus) (Kenya)	Loucas Christophides / Neoclis Neocleous; Balaraman Arun / Allan Cooper	6; 3	2; 6	7; 5

=== Congo vs. Kenya ===
Congo
1
Tennis Club de Brazzaville, Brazzaville, Congo
29 April 1995

Kenya
2

			1	2	3
1	(Republic of the Congo) (Kenya)	Martial Banguid; Norbert Oduor	2; 6	0; 6
2	(Republic of the Congo) (Kenya)	Nydiaye Daouda; Allan Cooper	1; 6	2; 6
3	(Republic of the Congo) (Kenya)	Alain Bemba / Nydiaye Daouda; Allan Cooper / Norbert Oduor	6; 4	6; 4

=== Ethiopia vs. Malta ===
Ethiopia
1
Tennis Club de Brazzaville, Brazzaville, Congo
29 April 1995

Malta
2

			1	2	3
1	(Ethiopia) (Malta)	Habtamu Gebrekidan; Mark Schembri	2; 6	6; 3	2; 6
2	(Ethiopia) (Malta)	Yohannes Setegnwandimu; Gordon Asciak	6^{2} 7^{7}	1; 6
3	(Ethiopia) (Malta)	Bogale Mengsha / Yohannes Setegnwandimu; Marco Cappello / Maurizio Cappello	6; 4	6; 3

=== Congo vs. Ethiopia ===
Congo
2
Tennis Club de Brazzaville, Brazzaville, Congo
30 April 1995

Ethiopia
1

			1	2	3
1	(Republic of the Congo) (Ethiopia)	Nydiaye Daouda; Habtamu Gebrekidan	3; 6	6; 3	6; 2
2	(Republic of the Congo) (Ethiopia)	Christian Bemba; Yohannes Setegnwandimu	2; 6	6; 2	3; 6
3	(Republic of the Congo) (Ethiopia)	Alain Bemba / Nydiaye Daouda; Bogale Mengsha / Yohannes Setegnwandimu	6; 0	7; 5

=== Cyprus vs. Malta ===
Cyprus
1
Tennis Club de Brazzaville, Brazzaville, Congo
30 April 1995

Malta
2

			1	2	3
1	(Cyprus) (Malta)	Demetrios Leontis; Mark Schembri	6; 0	6; 1
2	(Cyprus) (Malta)	Alkis Papamichael; Gordon Asciak	3; 6	2; 6
3	(Cyprus) (Malta)	Loucas Christophides / Neoclis Neocleous; Gordon Asciak / Mark Schembri	6^{2} 7^{7}	2; 6

== Group B ==
=== Algeria vs. Sudan ===
Algeria
3
Tennis Club de Brazzaville, Brazzaville, Congo
26 April 1995

Sudan
0

			1	2	3
1	(Algeria) (Sudan)	Ouassel Hared; Mandour Abdalla	6; 1	6; 1
2	(Algeria) (Sudan)	Abdelhak Hameurlaine; Abbas Jeha	6; 0	6; 2
3	(Algeria) (Sudan)	Noujeim Hakimi / Noureddine Mahmoudi; Mandour Abdalla / Mogeeb Abdalla	6; 2	6; 2

=== Senegal vs. Turkey ===
Senegal
1
Tennis Club de Brazzaville, Brazzaville, Congo
26 April 1995

Turkey
2

			1	2	3
1	(Senegal) (Turkey)	Abou Berthé; Erhan Oral	3; 6	4; 6
2	(Senegal) (Turkey)	Thierno Ly; Alaaddin Karagöz	3; 6	4; 6
3	(Senegal) (Turkey)	Abou Berthé / Thierno Ly; Berk Albayrak / Barış Ergün	6; 4	7^{7} 6^{4}

=== Algeria vs. Zambia ===
Algeria
3
Tennis Club de Brazzaville, Brazzaville, Congo
27 April 1995

Zambia
0

			1	2	3
1	(Algeria) (Zambia)	Ouassel Hared; Sidney Bwalya	6; 1	6; 0
2	(Algeria) (Zambia)	Abdelhak Hameurlaine; Lighton Ndefwai-Muchinda	6; 4	6; 3
3	(Algeria) (Zambia)	Noujeim Hakimi / Noureddine Mahmoudi; Patrick Kangwa / Lighton Ndefwai-Muchinda	6; 3	7; 5

=== Sudan vs. Turkey ===
Sudan
0
Tennis Club de Brazzaville, Brazzaville, Congo
27 April 1995

Turkey
3

			1	2	3
1	(Sudan) (Turkey)	Mandour Abdalla; Berk Albayrak	5; 7	1; 6
2	(Sudan) (Turkey)	Abbas Jeha; Barış Ergün	1; 6	1; 6
3	(Sudan) (Turkey)	Mandour Abdalla / Abbas Jeha; Alaaddin Karagöz / Erhan Oral	2; 6	2; 6

=== Algeria vs. Turkey ===
Algeria
3
Tennis Club de Brazzaville, Brazzaville, Congo
28 April 1995

Turkey
0

			1	2	3
1	(Algeria) (Turkey)	Ouassel Hared; Erhan Oral	6; 2	6; 2
2	(Algeria) (Turkey)	Abdelhak Hameurlaine; Alaaddin Karagöz	6; 2	6; 3
3	(Algeria) (Turkey)	Noujeim Hakimi / Noureddine Mahmoudi; Berk Albayrak / Barış Ergün	6; 1	7; 5

=== Senegal vs. Zambia ===
Senegal
1
Tennis Club de Brazzaville, Brazzaville, Congo
28 April 1995

Zambia
2

			1	2	3
1	(Senegal) (Zambia)	Thierno Ly; Sidney Bwalya	6^{5} 7^{7}	7^{7} 6^{5}	4; 6
2	(Senegal) (Zambia)	Fadel Berthé; Lighton Ndefwai-Muchinda	1; 6	4; 6
3	(Senegal) (Zambia)	Abou Berthé / Fadel Berthé; Sidney Bwalya / Patrick Kangwa	6; 3	6; 4

=== Algeria vs. Senegal ===
Algeria
2
Tennis Club de Brazzaville, Brazzaville, Congo
29 April 1995

Senegal
1

			1	2	3
1	(Algeria) (Senegal)	Ouassel Hared; Abou Berthé	6^{5} 7^{7}	5; 7
2	(Algeria) (Senegal)	Abdelhak Hameurlaine; Fadel Berthé	6; 2	6; 3
3	(Algeria) (Senegal)	Noujeim Hakimi / Noureddine Mahmoudi; Abou Berthé / Thierno Ly	6^{5} 7^{7}	7^{9} 6^{7}	6; 4

=== Sudan vs. Zambia ===
Sudan
0
Tennis Club de Brazzaville, Brazzaville, Congo
29 April 1995

Zambia
3

			1	2	3
1	(Sudan) (Zambia)	Mandour Abdalla; Sidney Bwalya	6^{4} 7^{7}	3; 6
2	(Sudan) (Zambia)	Abbas Jeha; Lighton Ndefwai-Muchinda	0; 6	1; 6
3	(Sudan) (Zambia)	Mandour Abdalla / Mogeeb Abdalla; Sidney Bwalya / Lighton Ndefwai-Muchinda	3; 6	5; 7

=== Senegal vs. Sudan ===
Senegal
3
Tennis Club de Brazzaville, Brazzaville, Congo
30 April 1995

Sudan
0

			1	2	3
1	(Senegal) (Sudan)	Abou Berthé; Mandour Abdalla	6; 0	6; 0
2	(Senegal) (Sudan)	Fadel Berthé; Abbas Jeha	6; 3	6; 1
3	(Senegal) (Sudan)	El Hadj Diedhiou / Thierno Ly; Mogeeb Abdalla / Abbas Jeha	6; 2	7^{13} 6^{11}

=== Turkey vs. Zambia ===
Turkey
2
Tennis Club de Brazzaville, Brazzaville, Congo
30 April 1995

Zambia
1

			1	2	3
1	(Turkey) (Zambia)	Barış Ergün; Sidney Bwalya	6; 4	6; 2
2	(Turkey) (Zambia)	Erhan Oral; Lighton Ndefwai-Muchinda	6; 4	6; 3
3	(Turkey) (Zambia)	Berk Albayrak / Barış Ergün; Sidney Bwalya / Patrick Kangwa	5; 7	3; 6
