= 1998 Davis Cup Europe/Africa Zone Group IV – Zone B =

International tennis competition

The Europe/Africa Zone was one of the three zones of the regional Davis Cup competition in 1998.

In the Europe/Africa Zone there were four different tiers, called groups, in which teams competed against each other to advance to the upper tier. The top two teams in Group IV advanced to the Europe/Africa Zone Group III in 1999. All other teams remained in Group IV.

== Participating nations ==
- Algeria
- Ethiopia
- Iceland
- Liechtenstein
- Zambia

=== Draw ===
- Venue: Ndola Tennis Club, Ndola, Zambia
- Date: 6–10 May

	ZAM	ALG	ETH	ISL	LIE	RR; W–L	Match; W–L	Set; W–L	Standings
Zambia		2–1	3–0	3–0	3–0	4–0	11–1 (92%)	23–5 (82%)	1
Algeria	1–2		2–1	3–0	3–0	3–1	9–3 (75%)	19–13 (59%)	2
Ethiopia	0–3	1–2		2–1	2–1	2–2	5–7 (42%)	12–17 (41%)	3
Iceland	0–3	0–3	1–2		2–1	1–3	3–9 (25%)	12–19 (39%)	4
Liechtenstein	0–3	0–3	1–2	1–2		0–4	2–10 (17%)	9–21 (30%)	5

- Zambia and Algeria promoted to Group III in 1999.

== Results ==
=== Zambia vs. Ethiopia ===
Zambia
3
Ndola Tennis Club, Ndola, Zambia
6 May 1998

Ethiopia
0

			1	2	3
1	(Zambia) (Ethiopia)	Sidney Bwalya; Yohannes Setegnwandimu	6; 3	6; 3
2	(Zambia) (Ethiopia)	Lighton Ndefwai-Muchinda; Samuel Woldegebriel	3; 6	6; 1	6; 2
3	(Zambia) (Ethiopia)	Kachinga Sinkala / Dermot Sweeney; Mikaile Asfaw / Yohannes Setegnwandimu	6; 2	6; 2

=== Algeria vs. Liechtenstein ===
Algeria
3
Ndola Tennis Club, Ndola, Zambia
6 May 1998

Liechtenstein
0

			1	2	3
1	(Algeria) (Liechtenstein)	Noureddine Mahmoudi; Jürgen Tömördy	7^{7} 6^{3}	4; 6	6; 3
2	(Algeria) (Liechtenstein)	Abdelhak Hameurlaine; Stephan Ritter	3; 6	6; 1	8; 6
3	(Algeria) (Liechtenstein)	Sid-Ali Akkal / Noureddine Mahmoudi; Frank Heeb / Rainer Kovac	6; 3	2; 6	6; 1

=== Zambia vs. Iceland ===
Zambia
3
Ndola Tennis Club, Ndola, Zambia
7 May 1998

Iceland
0

			1	2	3
1	(Zambia) (Iceland)	Dermot Sweeney; Arnar Sigurðsson	4; 6	6; 3	6; 4
2	(Zambia) (Iceland)	Lighton Ndefwai-Muchinda; Rafn Kumar Bonifacius	6; 4	6; 2
3	(Zambia) (Iceland)	Kachinga Sinkala / Dermot Sweeney; Gunnar Einarsson / Davíð Halldórsson	4; 6	6; 3	6; 2

=== Ethiopia vs. Liechtenstein ===
Ethiopia
2
Ndola Tennis Club, Ndola, Zambia
7 May 1998

Liechtenstein
1

			1	2	3
1	(Ethiopia) (Liechtenstein)	Yohannes Setegnwandimu; Jürgen Tömördy	6; 3	6; 3
2	(Ethiopia) (Liechtenstein)	Samuel Woldegebriel; Stephan Ritter	4; 6	2; 6
3	(Ethiopia) (Liechtenstein)	Mikaile Asfaw / Yohannes Setegnwandimu; Rainer Kovac / Stephan Ritter	6; 3	1; 6	6; 4

=== Algeria vs. Ethiopia ===
Algeria
2
Ndola Tennis Club, Ndola, Zambia
8 May 1998

Ethiopia
1

			1	2	3
1	(Algeria) (Ethiopia)	Mohammed Mahmoudi; Yohannes Setegnwandimu	3; 6	6; 1	6; 4
2	(Algeria) (Ethiopia)	Abdelhak Hameurlaine; Samuel Woldegebriel	6; 2	6; 1
3	(Algeria) (Ethiopia)	Sid-Ali Akkal / Noureddine Mahmoudi; Mikaile Asfaw / Yohannes Setegnwandimu	7; 5	4; 6	2; 6

=== Iceland vs. Liechtenstein ===
Iceland
2
Ndola Tennis Club, Ndola, Zambia
8 May 1998

Liechtenstein
1

			1	2	3
1	(Iceland) (Liechtenstein)	Arnar Sigurðsson; Jürgen Tömördy	6; 0	6; 1
2	(Iceland) (Liechtenstein)	Rafn Kumar Bonifacius; Stephan Ritter	2; 6	6; 4	1; 6
3	(Iceland) (Liechtenstein)	Gunnar Einarsson / Davíð Halldórsson; Rainer Kovac / Stephan Ritter	7^{7} 6^{4}	4; 6	8; 6

=== Zambia vs. Liechtenstein ===
Zambia
3
Ndola Tennis Club, Ndola, Zambia
9 May 1998

Liechtenstein
0

			1	2	3
1	(Zambia) (Liechtenstein)	Sidney Bwalya; Frank Heeb	6; 1	6; 0
2	(Zambia) (Liechtenstein)	Dermot Sweeney; Stephan Ritter	6; 4	6; 3
3	(Zambia) (Liechtenstein)	Sidney Bwalya / Kachinga Sinkala; Frank Heeb / Rainer Kovac	6; 2	7^{7} 6^{0}

=== Algeria vs. Iceland ===
Algeria
3
Ndola Tennis Club, Ndola, Zambia
9 May 1998

Iceland
0

			1	2	3
1	(Algeria) (Iceland)	Noureddine Mahmoudi; Gunnar Einarsson	7; 5	4; 6	6; 1
2	(Algeria) (Iceland)	Abdelhak Hameurlaine; Arnar Sigurðsson	6^{6} 7^{8}	6; 0	6; 4
3	(Algeria) (Iceland)	Abdelhak Hameurlaine / Mohammed Mahmoudi; Rafn Kumar Bonifacius / Davíð Halldórsson	6; 2	6; 4

=== Zambia vs. Algeria ===
Zambia
2
Ndola Tennis Club, Ndola, Zambia
10 May 1998

Algeria
1

			1	2	3
1	(Zambia) (Algeria)	Sidney Bwalya; Mohammed Mahmoudi	6; 3	6; 2
2	(Zambia) (Algeria)	Kachinga Sinkala; Abdelhak Hameurlaine	6; 1	3; 6	4; 6
3	(Zambia) (Algeria)	Sidney Bwalya / Lighton Ndefwai-Muchinda; Abdelhak Hameurlaine / Noureddine Mahmoudi	6; 4	6; 3

=== Ethiopia vs. Iceland ===
Ethiopia
2
Ndola Tennis Club, Ndola, Zambia
10 May 1998

Iceland
1

			1	2	3
1	(Ethiopia) (Iceland)	Yohannes Setegnwandimu; Gunnar Einarsson	6; 3	7^{7} 6^{1}
2	(Ethiopia) (Iceland)	Samuel Woldegebriel; Arnar Sigurðsson	1; 6	1; 6
3	(Ethiopia) (Iceland)	Mikaile Asfaw / Yohannes Setegnwandimu; Rafn Kumar Bonifacius / Arnar Sigurðsson	2; 6	6; 3	6; 4
