= 1996 Davis Cup Europe/Africa Zone Group III – Zone A =

International tennis competition

Zone A of the 1996 Davis Cup Europe/Africa Group III was one of two zones in the Europe/Africa Group III of the 1996 Davis Cup. 14 teams competed across two pools in a round robin competition, with the top team in each pool advancing to Group II in 1997. In a move to a four-tier system, the bottom three teams in each pool were reassigned to the new Group IV in 1997; all other teams remained in Group III.

== Participating nations ==
- Armenia
- Azerbaijan
- Benin
- Bosnia and Herzegovina
- Ethiopia
- Georgia
- Iceland
- Liechtenstein
- Lithuania
- San Marino
- Senegal
- Sudan
- Tunisia
- Turkey

=== Draw ===
- Venue: T.E.D. Club, Istanbul, Turkey
- Date: 20–26 May

Group A

	LTU	SEN	SMR	ETH	AZE	ISL	SUD	RR; W–L	Match; W–L	Set; W–L	Standings
Lithuania		3–0	3–0	3–0	3–0	3–0	3–0	6–0	18–0 (100%)	36–3 (92%)	1
Senegal	0–3		2–1	2–1	3–0	3–0	3–0	5–1	13–5 (72%)	28–13 (68%)	2
San Marino	0–3	1–2		3–0	3–0	3–0	3–0	4–2	13–5 (72%)	27–12 (69%)	3
Ethiopia	0–3	1–2	0–3		3–0	2–1	2–1	3–3	8–10 (44%)	18–23 (44%)	4
Azerbaijan	0–3	0–3	0–3	0–3		2–1	2–1	2–4	4–14 (22%)	12–30 (29%)	5
Iceland	0–3	0–3	0–3	1–2	1–2		3–0	1–5	5–13 (28%)	13–26 (33%)	6
Sudan	0–3	0–3	0–3	1–2	1–2	0–3		0–6	2–16 (11%)	6–33 (15%)	7

Group B

	GEO	TUR	ARM	BIH	LIE	TUN	BEN	RR; W–L	Match; W–L	Set; W–L	Standings
Georgia		2–1	2–1	2–1	2–1	2–1	3–0	6–0	13–5 (72%)	28–11 (72%)	1
Turkey	1–2		2–1	2–1	3–0	3–0	3–0	5–1	14–4 (78%)	28–9 (76%)	2
Armenia	1–2	1–2		2–1	3–0	3–0	2–1	4–2	12–6 (67%)	27–16 (63%)	3
Bosnia and Herzegovina	1–2	1–2	1–2		2–1	2–1	3–0	3–3	10–8 (56%)	22–20 (52%)	4
Liechtenstein	1–2	0–3	0–3	1–2		3–0	2–1	2–4	7–11 (39%)	16–24 (40%)	5
Tunisia	1–2	0–3	0–3	1–2	0–3		2–1	1–5	4–14 (22%)	13–30 (30%)	6
Benin	0–3	0–3	1–2	0–3	1–2	1–2		0–6	3–15 (17%)	7–31 (18%)	7

- Lithuania and Georgia promoted to Group II in 1997.
- Azerbaijan, Iceland, Sudan, Liechtenstein, Tunisia and Benin assigned to Group IV in 1997.

== Group A ==
=== Azerbaijan vs. Sudan ===
Azerbaijan
2
T.E.D. Club, Istanbul, Turkey
20 May 1996

Sudan
1

			1	2	3
1	(Azerbaijan) (Sudan)	Igor Borisov; Abbas Jeha	6; 2	6; 4
2	(Azerbaijan) (Sudan)	Dmitri Zarubin; Khalid Farid	7; 5	6; 1
3	(Azerbaijan) (Sudan)	Raouf Eybazov / Eldar Kafarov; Asim Omar El-Agraa / Khalid Farid	2; 6	1; 6

=== Ethiopia vs. Senegal ===
Ethiopia
1
T.E.D. Club, Istanbul, Turkey
20 May 1996

Senegal
2

			1	2	3
1	(Ethiopia) (Senegal)	Mikaile Asfaw; Thierno Ly	4; 6	2; 6
2	(Ethiopia) (Senegal)	Yohannes Setegnwandimu; Abou Berthé	4; 6	2; 6
3	(Ethiopia) (Senegal)	Mikaile Asfaw / Yohannes Setegnwandimu; Mansour Diedhiou / Cheick Koita	4; 6	7^{7} 6^{2}	6; 4

=== Iceland vs. San Marino ===
Iceland
0
T.E.D. Club, Istanbul, Turkey
20 May 1996

San Marino
3

			1	2	3
1	(Iceland) (San Marino)	Gunnar Einarsson; Massimiliano Rosti	0; 6	6^{0} 7^{7}
2	(Iceland) (San Marino)	Einar Sigurgeirsson; Domenico Vicini	4; 6	3; 6
3	(Iceland) (San Marino)	Stefán Pálsson / Atli Þorbjörnsson; Massimiliano Rosti / Domenico Vicini	6^{4} 7^{7}	4; 6

=== Azerbaijan vs. Senegal ===
Azerbaijan
0
T.E.D. Club, Istanbul, Turkey
21 May 1996

Senegal
3

			1	2	3
1	(Azerbaijan) (Senegal)	Dmitri Zarubin; Thierno Ly	6; 3	1; 6	4; 6
2	(Azerbaijan) (Senegal)	Igor Borisov; Abou Berthé	2; 6	0; 6
3	(Azerbaijan) (Senegal)	Raouf Eybazov / Dmitri Zarubin; Abou Berthé / Thierno Ly	3; 6	3; 6

=== Ethiopia vs. Sudan ===
Ethiopia
2
T.E.D. Club, Istanbul, Turkey
21 May 1996

Sudan
1

			1	2	3
1	(Ethiopia) (Sudan)	Samuel Woldegebriel; Asim Omar El-Agraa	1; 6	6; 3	6; 1
2	(Ethiopia) (Sudan)	Yohannes Setegnwandimu; Abbas Jeha	6; 1	6; 2
3	(Ethiopia) (Sudan)	Mikaile Asfaw / Yohannes Setegnwandimu; Asim Omar El-Agraa / Khalid Farid	6; 1	5; 7	3; 6

=== Iceland vs. Lithuania ===
Iceland
0
T.E.D. Club, Istanbul, Turkey
21 May 1996

Lithuania
3

			1	2	3
1	(Iceland) (Lithuania)	Stefán Pálsson; Gitanas Mažonas	3; 6	1; 6
2	(Iceland) (Lithuania)	Atli Þorbjörnsson; Rolandas Muraška	1; 6	1; 6
3	(Iceland) (Lithuania)	Stefán Pálsson / Atli Þorbjörnsson; Eugenius Cariovas / Denis Ivancovas	6^{6} 7^{8}	3; 6

=== Azerbaijan vs. San Marino ===
Azerbaijan
0
T.E.D. Club, Istanbul, Turkey
22 May 1996

San Marino
3

			1	2	3
1	(Azerbaijan) (San Marino)	Dmitri Zarubin; Gabriel Francini	1; 6	1; 6
2	(Azerbaijan) (San Marino)	Raouf Eybazov; Massimiliano Rosti	0; 6	0; 6
3	(Azerbaijan) (San Marino)	Igor Borisov / Raouf Eybazov; Christian Rosti / Domenico Vicini	2; 6	7; 5	1; 6

=== Ethiopia vs. Lithuania ===
Ethiopia
0
T.E.D. Club, Istanbul, Turkey
22 May 1996

Lithuania
3

			1	2	3
1	(Ethiopia) (Lithuania)	Daniel Mebrahtu; Gitanas Mažonas	1; 6	0; 6
2	(Ethiopia) (Lithuania)	Samuel Woldegebriel; Rolandas Muraška	2; 6	0; 6
3	(Ethiopia) (Lithuania)	Mikaile Asfaw / Yohannes Setegnwandimu; Eugenius Cariovas / Denis Ivancovas	6; 3	3; 6	1; 6

=== Iceland vs. Sudan ===
Iceland
3
T.E.D. Club, Istanbul, Turkey
22 May 1996

Sudan
0

			1	2	3
1	(Iceland) (Sudan)	Gunnar Einarsson; Asim Omar El-Agraa	6; 4	6; 1
2	(Iceland) (Sudan)	Einar Sigurgeirsson; Khalid Farid	6; 2	6; 2
3	(Iceland) (Sudan)	Gunnar Einarsson / Atli Þorbjörnsson; Nour Abdalla / Khalid Farid	6; 2	6; 3

=== Ethiopia vs. Iceland ===
Ethiopia
2
T.E.D. Club, Istanbul, Turkey
23 May 1996

Iceland
1

			1	2	3
1	(Ethiopia) (Iceland)	Mikaile Asfaw; Gunnar Einarsson	3; 6	1; 6
2	(Ethiopia) (Iceland)	Yohannes Setegnwandimu; Einar Sigurgeirsson	6; 2	6; 2
3	(Ethiopia) (Iceland)	Mikaile Asfaw / Yohannes Setegnwandimu; Stefán Pálsson / Atli Þorbjörnsson	7; 5	7^{7} 6^{4}

=== Lithuania vs. San Marino ===
Lithuania
3
T.E.D. Club, Istanbul, Turkey
23 May 1996

San Marino
0

			1	2	3
1	(Lithuania) (San Marino)	Gitanas Mažonas; Massimiliano Rosti	6; 3	7; 5
2	(Lithuania) (San Marino)	Rolandas Muraška; Domenico Vicini	6; 4	6; 4
3	(Lithuania) (San Marino)	Eugenius Cariovas / Denis Ivancovas; Gabriel Francini / Domenico Vicini	6^{3} 7^{7}	6; 3	6; 4

=== Senegal vs. Sudan ===
Senegal
3
T.E.D. Club, Istanbul, Turkey
23 May 1996

Sudan
0

			1	2	3
1	(Senegal) (Sudan)	Thierno Ly; Khalid Farid	6; 2	6; 4
2	(Senegal) (Sudan)	Abou Berthé; Abbas Jeha	6; 3	6; 1
3	(Senegal) (Sudan)	Mansour Diedhiou / Cheick Koita; Asim Omar El-Agraa / Abbas Jeha	6; 0	2; 6	7; 5

=== Azerbaijan vs. Lithuania ===
Azerbaijan
0
T.E.D. Club, Istanbul, Turkey
24 May 1996

Lithuania
3

			1	2	3
1	(Azerbaijan) (Lithuania)	Dmitri Zarubin; Eugenius Cariovas	6; 4	2; 6	0; 6
2	(Azerbaijan) (Lithuania)	Eldar Kafarov; Rolandas Muraška	1; 6	1; 6
3	(Azerbaijan) (Lithuania)	Igor Borisov / Eldar Kafarov; Eugenius Cariovas / Rolandas Muraška	2; 6	1; 6

=== Iceland vs. Senegal ===
Iceland
0
T.E.D. Club, Istanbul, Turkey
24 May 1996

Senegal
3

			1	2	3
1	(Iceland) (Senegal)	Gunnar Einarsson; Thierno Ly	2; 6	4; 6
2	(Iceland) (Senegal)	Einar Sigurgeirsson; Abou Berthé	6; 3	5; 7	1; 6
3	(Iceland) (Senegal)	Stefán Pálsson / Einar Sigurgeirsson; Abou Berthé / Thierno Ly	2; 6	2; 6

=== San Marino vs. Sudan ===
San Marino
3
T.E.D. Club, Istanbul, Turkey
24 May 1996

Sudan
0

			1	2	3
1	(San Marino) (Sudan)	Christian Rosti; Asim Omar El-Agraa	6; 2	6; 4
2	(San Marino) (Sudan)	Gabriel Francini; Abbas Jeha	6; 1	6; 0
3	(San Marino) (Sudan)	Massimiliano Rosti / Domenico Vicini; Asim Omar El-Agraa / Abbas Jeha	6; 3	6; 2

=== Azerbaijan vs. Ethiopia ===
Azerbaijan
0
T.E.D. Club, Istanbul, Turkey
25 May 1996

Ethiopia
3

			1	2	3
1	(Azerbaijan) (Ethiopia)	Dmitri Zarubin; Samuel Woldegebriel	6; 4	6^{7} 7^{9}	4; 6
2	(Azerbaijan) (Ethiopia)	Igor Borisov; Yohannes Setegnwandimu	4; 6	3; 6
3	(Azerbaijan) (Ethiopia)	Raouf Eybazov / Eldar Kafarov; Mikaile Asfaw / Yohannes Setegnwandimu	0; 6	2; 6

=== Lithuania vs. Sudan ===
Lithuania
3
T.E.D. Club, Istanbul, Turkey
25 May 1996

Sudan
0

			1	2	3
1	(Lithuania) (Sudan)	Denis Ivancovas; Asim Omar El-Agraa	6; 2	6; 1
2	(Lithuania) (Sudan)	Gitanas Mažonas; Abbas Jeha	6; 0	6; 0
3	(Lithuania) (Sudan)	Eugenius Cariovas / Denis Ivancovas; Asim Omar El-Agraa / Khalid Farid	6; 2	6; 2

=== San Marino vs. Senegal ===
San Marino
1
T.E.D. Club, Istanbul, Turkey
25 May 1996

Senegal
2

			1	2	3
1	(San Marino) (Senegal)	Gabriel Francini; Thierno Ly	5; 7	4; 6
2	(San Marino) (Senegal)	Domenico Vicini; Abou Berthé	6^{4} 7^{7}	7^{8} 6^{6}	13; 11
3	(San Marino) (Senegal)	Christian Rosti / Massimiliano Rosti; Abou Berthé / Thierno Ly	3; 6	4; 6

=== Azerbaijan vs. Iceland ===
Azerbaijan
2
T.E.D. Club, Istanbul, Turkey
26 May 1996

Iceland
1

			1	2	3
1	(Azerbaijan) (Iceland)	Dmitri Zarubin; Gunnar Einarsson	1; 6	6; 4	7; 5
2	(Azerbaijan) (Iceland)	Igor Borisov; Einar Sigurgeirsson	6; 4	6^{6} 7^{8}	6; 2
3	(Azerbaijan) (Iceland)	Igor Borisov / Dmitri Zarubin; Stefán Pálsson / Atli Þorbjörnsson	1; 6	3; 6

=== Ethiopia vs. San Marino ===
Ethiopia
0
T.E.D. Club, Istanbul, Turkey
26 May 1996

San Marino
3

			1	2	3
1	(Ethiopia) (San Marino)	Samuel Woldegebriel; Massimiliano Rosti	0; 6	1; 6
2	(Ethiopia) (San Marino)	Yohannes Setegnwandimu; Domenico Vicini	4; 6	2; 6
3	(Ethiopia) (San Marino)	Mikaile Asfaw / Yohannes Setegnwandimu; Christian Rosti / Massimiliano Rosti	1; 6	1; 6

=== Lithuania vs. Senegal ===
Lithuania
3
T.E.D. Club, Istanbul, Turkey
26 May 1996

Senegal
0

			1	2	3
1	(Lithuania) (Senegal)	Gitanas Mažonas; Thierno Ly	6; 0	6; 1
2	(Lithuania) (Senegal)	Rolandas Muraška; Abou Berthé	6; 1	6; 2
3	(Lithuania) (Senegal)	Eugenius Cariovas / Denis Ivancovas; Mansour Diedhiou / Cheick Koita	7^{7} 6^{3}	6; 3

== Group B ==
=== Turkey vs. Benin ===
Turkey
3
T.E.D. Club, Istanbul, Turkey
20 May 1996

Benin
0

			1	2	3
1	(Turkey) (Benin)	Erhan Oral; Jean-Marie da Silva	6; 4	6; 0
2	(Turkey) (Benin)	Mustafa Azkara; Alphonse Gandonou	6; 2	6; 3
3	(Turkey) (Benin)	Barış Ergün / Alaaddin Karagöz; Jean-Marie da Silva / Alphonse Gandonou	6; 0	6; 2

=== Armenia vs. Bosnia and Herzegovina ===
Armenia
2
T.E.D. Club, Istanbul, Turkey
20 May 1996

Bosnia and Herzegovina
1

			1	2	3
1	(Armenia) (Bosnia and Herzegovina)	Tsolak Gevorgyan; Eldar Mustafić	3; 6	6; 1	6; 4
2	(Armenia) (Bosnia and Herzegovina)	Sargis Sargsian; Meride Zahirović	2; 6	6; 3	4; 6
3	(Armenia) (Bosnia and Herzegovina)	Sargis Sargsian / Artur Tombakian; Haris Bašalić / Meride Zahirović	6; 4	6; 4

=== Georgia vs. Tunisia ===
Georgia
2
T.E.D. Club, Istanbul, Turkey
20 May 1996

Tunisia
1

			1	2	3
1	(Georgia (country)) (Tunisia)	David Katcharava; Sami Sidia	6; 4	7^{7} 6^{4}
2	(Georgia (country)) (Tunisia)	Vladimir Gabrichidze; Adel Lahdhiri	6; 4	3; 6	0; 6
3	(Georgia (country)) (Tunisia)	David Katcharava / Vladimir Margalitadze; Walid Jallali / Sami Sidia	6; 3	6; 4

=== Turkey vs. Liechtenstein ===
Turkey
3
T.E.D. Club, Istanbul, Turkey
21 May 1996

Liechtenstein
0

			1	2	3
1	(Turkey) (Liechtenstein)	Barış Ergün; Stephan Ritter	7; 5	6; 3
2	(Turkey) (Liechtenstein)	Alaaddin Karagöz; Christoph Hoop	6; 3	7^{7} 6^{0}
3	(Turkey) (Liechtenstein)	Mustafa Azkara / Erhan Oral; Daniel Kieber / Jürgen Tömördy	6; 3	6; 2

=== Armenia vs. Georgia ===
Armenia
1
T.E.D. Club, Istanbul, Turkey
21 May 1996

Georgia
2

			1	2	3
1	(Armenia) (Georgia (country))	Tsolak Gevorgyan; David Katcharava	2; 6	2; 6
2	(Armenia) (Georgia (country))	Sargis Sargsian; Vladimir Gabrichidze	6; 1	4; 6	4; 6
3	(Armenia) (Georgia (country))	Sargis Sargsian / Artur Tombakian; Irakli Kunchulia / Vladimir Margalitadze	6; 2	6; 3

=== Bosnia and Herzegovina vs. Tunisia ===
Bosnia and Herzegovina
2
T.E.D. Club, Istanbul, Turkey
21 May 1996

Tunisia
1

			1	2	3
1	(Bosnia and Herzegovina) (Tunisia)	Eldar Mustafić; Walid Jallali	6; 4	6^{5} 7^{7}	6; 2
2	(Bosnia and Herzegovina) (Tunisia)	Meride Zahirović; Adel Lahdhiri	6; 2	6; 0
3	(Bosnia and Herzegovina) (Tunisia)	Haris Bašalić / Eldar Mustafić; Walid Jallali / Sami Sidia	5; 7	1; 6

=== Turkey vs. Bosnia and Herzegovina ===
Turkey
2
T.E.D. Club, Istanbul, Turkey
22 May 1996

Bosnia and Herzegovina
1

			1	2	3
1	(Turkey) (Bosnia and Herzegovina)	Erhan Oral; Eldar Mustafić	7^{7} 6^{4}	6; 1
2	(Turkey) (Bosnia and Herzegovina)	Alaaddin Karagöz; Meride Zahirović	5; 7	4; 6
3	(Turkey) (Bosnia and Herzegovina)	Mustafa Azkara / Erhan Oral; Eldar Mustafić / Meride Zahirović	7; 5	6; 1

=== Armenia vs. Liechtenstein ===
Armenia
3
T.E.D. Club, Istanbul, Turkey
22 May 1996

Liechtenstein
0

			1	2	3
1	(Armenia) (Liechtenstein)	Tsolak Gevorgyan; Daniel Kieber	6; 2	6; 2
2	(Armenia) (Liechtenstein)	Sargis Sargsian; Jürgen Tömördy	6; 0	6; 0
3	(Armenia) (Liechtenstein)	Sargis Sargsian / Artur Tombakian; Christoph Hoop / Stephan Ritter	6; 3	6; 1

=== Benin vs. Georgia ===
Benin
0
T.E.D. Club, Istanbul, Turkey
22 May 1996

Georgia
3

			1	2	3
1	(Benin) (Georgia (country))	Christophe Pognon; David Katcharava	3; 6	3; 6
2	(Benin) (Georgia (country))	Alphonse Gandonou; Vladimir Margalitadze	1; 6	2; 6
3	(Benin) (Georgia (country))	Jean-Marie da Silva / Toussaint Gandonou; Irakli Kunchulia / Vladimir Margalitadze	3; 6	2; 6

=== Armenia vs. Tunisia ===
Armenia
3
T.E.D. Club, Istanbul, Turkey
23 May 1996

Tunisia
0

			1	2	3
1	(Armenia) (Tunisia)	Tsolak Gevorgyan; Sami Sidia	6; 4	3; 6	6; 4
2	(Armenia) (Tunisia)	Sargis Sargsian; Adel Lahdhiri	4; 6	6; 0	6; 1
3	(Armenia) (Tunisia)	Sargis Sargsian / Artur Tombakian; Walid Jallali / Sami Sidia	6; 1	4; 6	6; 3

=== Benin vs. Liechtenstein ===
Benin
1
T.E.D. Club, Istanbul, Turkey
23 May 1996

Liechtenstein
2

			1	2	3
1	(Benin) (Liechtenstein)	Christophe Pognon; Stephan Ritter	3; 6	0; 6
2	(Benin) (Liechtenstein)	Alphonse Gandonou; Christoph Hoop	6^{5} 7^{7}	3; 6
3	(Benin) (Liechtenstein)	Jean-Marie da Silva / Alphonse Gandonou; Daniel Kieber / Jürgen Tömördy	7^{7} 6^{4}	6; 3

=== Bosnia and Herzegovina vs. Georgia ===
Bosnia and Herzegovina
1
T.E.D. Club, Istanbul, Turkey
23 May 1996

Georgia
2

			1	2	3
1	(Bosnia and Herzegovina) (Georgia (country))	Haris Bašalić; Vladimir Margalitadze	3; 6	4; 6
2	(Bosnia and Herzegovina) (Georgia (country))	Meride Zahirović; Vladimir Gabrichidze	6; 1	6; 3
3	(Bosnia and Herzegovina) (Georgia (country))	Eldar Mustafić / Meride Zahirović; Vladimir Gabrichidze / David Katcharava	4; 6	0; 6

=== Turkey vs. Armenia ===
Turkey
2
T.E.D. Club, Istanbul, Turkey
24 May 1996

Armenia
1

			1	2	3
1	(Turkey) (Armenia)	Erhan Oral; Tsolak Gevorgyan	7; 5	6; 3
2	(Turkey) (Armenia)	Mustafa Azkara; Sargis Sargsian	1; 6	1; 6
3	(Turkey) (Armenia)	Barış Ergün / Alaaddin Karagöz; Sargis Sargsian / Artur Tombakian	6; 3	7^{7} 6^{2}

=== Benin vs. Tunisia ===
Benin
1
T.E.D. Club, Istanbul, Turkey
24 May 1996

Tunisia
2

			1	2	3
1	(Benin) (Tunisia)	Christophe Pognon; Walid Jallali	1; 6	6; 1	6; 8
2	(Benin) (Tunisia)	Alphonse Gandonou; Adel Lahdhiri	6^{3} 7^{7}	3; 6
3	(Benin) (Tunisia)	Jean-Marie da Silva / Alphonse Gandonou; Walid Jallali / Haikel Kastelli	7; 5	6; 3

=== Bosnia and Herzegovina vs. Liechtenstein ===
Bosnia and Herzegovina
2
T.E.D. Club, Istanbul, Turkey
24 May 1996

Liechtenstein
1

			1	2	3
1	(Bosnia and Herzegovina) (Liechtenstein)	Eldar Mustafić; Stephan Ritter	6; 1	4; 6	4; 6
2	(Bosnia and Herzegovina) (Liechtenstein)	Meride Zahirović; Christoph Hoop	6; 3	4; 6	6; 1
3	(Bosnia and Herzegovina) (Liechtenstein)	Eldar Mustafić / Meride Zahirović; Christoph Hoop / Stephan Ritter	6; 1	4; 6	6; 3

=== Turkey vs. Georgia ===
Turkey
1
T.E.D. Club, Istanbul, Turkey
25 May 1996

Georgia
2

			1	2	3
1	(Turkey) (Georgia (country))	Erhan Oral; David Katcharava	0; 6	5; 7
2	(Turkey) (Georgia (country))	Alaaddin Karagöz; Vladimir Gabrichidze	6; 4	3; 6	7; 5
3	(Turkey) (Georgia (country))	Barış Ergün / Alaaddin Karagöz; Vladimir Gabrichidze / David Katcharava	2; 6	2; 6

=== Armenia vs. Benin ===
Armenia
2
T.E.D. Club, Istanbul, Turkey
25 May 1996

Benin
1

			1	2	3
1	(Armenia) (Benin)	Artur Nesisian; Christophe Pognon	7; 5	4; 6	1; 6
2	(Armenia) (Benin)	Tsolak Gevorgyan; Alphonse Gandonou	6; 2	6; 4
3	(Armenia) (Benin)	Tsolak Gevorgyan / Sargis Sargsian; Jean-Marie da Silva / Alphonse Gandonou	6; 1	6; 0

=== Liechtenstein vs. Tunisia ===
Liechtenstein
3
T.E.D. Club, Istanbul, Turkey
25 May 1996

Tunisia
0

			1	2	3
1	(Liechtenstein) (Tunisia)	Stephan Ritter; Haikel Kastelli	6; 4	6; 0
2	(Liechtenstein) (Tunisia)	Christoph Hoop; Walid Jallali	6; 2	7; 5
3	(Liechtenstein) (Tunisia)	Daniel Kieber / Jürgen Tömördy; Walid Jallali / Haikel Kastelli	6; 3	4; 6	6; 4

=== Turkey vs. Tunisia ===
Turkey
3
T.E.D. Club, Istanbul, Turkey
26 May 1996

Tunisia
0

			1	2	3
1	(Turkey) (Tunisia)	Erhan Oral; Haikel Kastelli	6; 3	6; 0
2	(Turkey) (Tunisia)	Mustafa Azkara; Walid Jallali	6; 2	6; 4
3	(Turkey) (Tunisia)	Mustafa Azkara / Erhan Oral; Walid Jallali / Haikel Kastelli	6; 0	6; 3

=== Benin vs. Bosnia and Herzegovina ===
Benin
0
T.E.D. Club, Istanbul, Turkey
26 May 1996

Bosnia and Herzegovina
3

			1	2	3
1	(Benin) (Bosnia and Herzegovina)	Toussaint Gandonou; Eldar Mustafić	0; 6	0; 6
2	(Benin) (Bosnia and Herzegovina)	Alphonse Gandonou; Meride Zahirović	1; 6	2; 6
3	(Benin) (Bosnia and Herzegovina)	Alphonse Gandonou / Toussaint Gandonou; Eldar Mustafić / Meride Zahirović	1; 6	1; 6

=== Georgia vs. Liechtenstein ===
Georgia
2
T.E.D. Club, Istanbul, Turkey
26 May 1996

Liechtenstein
1

			1	2	3
1	(Georgia (country)) (Liechtenstein)	Irakli Kunchulia; Stephan Ritter	6^{6} 7^{8}	0; 6
2	(Georgia (country)) (Liechtenstein)	Vladimir Margalitadze; Christoph Hoop	7^{7} 6^{5}	6; 3
3	(Georgia (country)) (Liechtenstein)	Vladimir Gabrichidze / Vladimir Margalitadze; Stephan Ritter / Jürgen Tömördy	6; 2	6; 2
