= 1997 Davis Cup Europe/Africa Zone Group IV – Zone B =

International tennis competition

The Europe/Africa Zone was one of the three zones in the regional Davis Cup competition in 1997.

Within the Europe/Africa Zone, there were four tiers, known as groups, where teams competed against each other to advance to the upper tier. The top two teams from Europe/Africa Zone Group IV advanced to Europe/Africa Zone Group III in 1998. All other teams remained in Group IV.

== Participating nations ==
- Azerbaijan
- Benin
- Cyprus
- Congo
- Tunisia
- Zambia

=== Draw ===
- Venue: Field Club, Nicosia, Cyprus
- Date: 21–25 May

	TUN	CYP	BEN	ZAM	AZE	CGO	RR; W–L	Match; W–L	Set; W–L	Standings
Tunisia		2–1	3–0	2–1	3–0	3–0	5–0	13–2 (87%)	27–5 (84%)	1
Cyprus	1–2		2–1	2–1	3–0	3–0	4–1	11–4 (73%)	23–8 (74%)	2
Benin	0–3	1–2		2–1	3–0	3–0	3–2	9–6 (60%)	16–12 (57%)	3
Zambia	1–2	1–2	1–2		3–0	3–0	2–3	9–6 (60%)	17–13 (57%)	4
Azerbaijan	0–3	0–3	0–3	0–3		2–1	1–4	2–13 (13%)	4–24 (14%)	5
Congo	0–3	0–3	0–3	0–3	1–2		0–5	1–14 (7%)	3–28 (10%)	6

- Tunisia and Cyprus promoted to Group III in 1998.

== Results ==
=== Cyprus vs. Congo ===
Cyprus
3
Field Club, Nicosia, Cyprus
21 May 1997

Congo
0

			1	2	3
1	(Cyprus) (Republic of the Congo)	Marinos Baghdatis; Chatrian Gnitou	6; 4	6; 0
2	(Cyprus) (Republic of the Congo)	Demetrios Leontis; Alain Bemba	6; 1	6; 1
3	(Cyprus) (Republic of the Congo)	Demetrios Leontis / Neoclis Neocleous; Martial Banguid / Chatrian Gnitou	6; 2	6; 1

=== Azerbaijan vs. Zambia ===
Azerbaijan
0
Field Club, Nicosia, Cyprus
21 May 1997

Zambia
3

			1	2	3
1	(Azerbaijan) (Zambia)	Dmitri Zarubin; Kachinga Sinkala	2; 6	0; 6
2	(Azerbaijan) (Zambia)	Igor Borisov; Lighton Ndefwai-Muchinda	3; 6	3; 6
3	(Azerbaijan) (Zambia)	Raouf Eybazov / Dmitri Zarubin; Sidney Bwalya / Lawrence Chileshe	0; 6	0; 1		retired

=== Benin vs. Tunisia ===
Benin
0
Field Club, Nicosia, Cyprus
21 May 1997

Tunisia
3

			1	2	3
1	(Benin) (Tunisia)	Alphonse Gandonou; Sami Sidia	1; 6	4; 6
2	(Benin) (Tunisia)	Christophe Pognon; Walid Jallali	1; 6	5; 7
3	(Benin) (Tunisia)	Alphonse Gandonou / Jean-Marie da Silva; Walid Jallali / Sami Sidia	1; 6	2; 6

=== Cyprus vs. Zambia ===
Cyprus
2
Field Club, Nicosia, Cyprus
22 May 1997

Zambia
1

			1	2	3
1	(Cyprus) (Zambia)	Marinos Baghdatis; Kachinga Sinkala	6; 4	6; 4
2	(Cyprus) (Zambia)	Demetrios Leontis; Lighton Ndefwai-Muchinda	6; 3	6; 4
3	(Cyprus) (Zambia)	Demetrios Leontis / Neoclis Neocleous; Sidney Bwalya / Lighton Ndefwai-Muchinda	5; 7	2; 6

=== Azerbaijan vs. Tunisia ===
Azerbaijan
0
Field Club, Nicosia, Cyprus
22 May 1997

Tunisia
3

			1	2	3
1	(Azerbaijan) (Tunisia)	Dmitri Zarubin; Sami Sidia	1; 6	0; 6
2	(Azerbaijan) (Tunisia)	Igor Borisov; Walid Jallali	2; 6	1; 6
3	(Azerbaijan) (Tunisia)	Igor Borisov / Dmitri Zarubin; Walid Jallali / Sami Sidia	1; 6	2; 6

=== Benin vs. Congo ===
Benin
3
Field Club, Nicosia, Cyprus
22 May 1997

Congo
0

			1	2	3
1	(Benin) (Republic of the Congo)	Alphonse Gandonou; Martial Banguid	6; 2	6; 0
2	(Benin) (Republic of the Congo)	Christophe Pognon; Chatrian Gnitou	6; 3	6; 1
3	(Benin) (Republic of the Congo)	Alphonse Gandonou / Jean-Marie da Silva; Alain Bemba / Chatrian Gnitou	6; 4	6; 1

=== Cyprus vs. Azerbaijan ===
Cyprus
3
Field Club, Nicosia, Cyprus
23 May 1997

Azerbaijan
0

			1	2	3
1	(Cyprus) (Azerbaijan)	Marinos Baghdatis; Dmitri Zarubin	6; 1	6; 4
2	(Cyprus) (Azerbaijan)	Demetrios Leontis; Igor Borisov	6; 2	6; 1
3	(Cyprus) (Azerbaijan)	Demetrios Leontis / Neoclis Neocleous; Igor Borisov / Dmitri Zarubin	6; 4	6; 4

=== Benin vs. Zambia ===
Benin
2
Field Club, Nicosia, Cyprus
23 May 1997

Zambia
1

			1	2	3
1	(Benin) (Zambia)	Alphonse Gandonou; Kachinga Sinkala	6; 4	6; 1
2	(Benin) (Zambia)	Christophe Pognon; Lighton Ndefwai-Muchinda	6; 4	6; 2
3	(Benin) (Zambia)	Alphonse Gandonou / Jean-Marie da Silva; Sidney Bwalya / Lawrence Chileshe	3; 6	5; 7

=== Congo vs. Tunisia ===
Congo
0
Field Club, Nicosia, Cyprus
23 May 1997

Tunisia
3

			1	2	3
1	(Republic of the Congo) (Tunisia)	Pagnol Madzou; Sami Sidia	1; 6	1; 6
2	(Republic of the Congo) (Tunisia)	Martial Banguid; Walid Jallali	0; 6	1; 6
3	(Republic of the Congo) (Tunisia)	Alain Bemba / Chatrian Gnitou; Walid Jallali / Sami Sidia	0; 6	1; 6

=== Cyprus vs. Benin ===
Cyprus
2
Field Club, Nicosia, Cyprus
24 May 1997

Benin
1

			1	2	3
1	(Cyprus) (Benin)	Marinos Baghdatis; Alphonse Gandonou	6; 3	6; 3
2	(Cyprus) (Benin)	Demetrios Leontis; Christophe Pognon	4; 6	3; 6
3	(Cyprus) (Benin)	Demetrios Leontis / Neoclis Neocleous; Alphonse Gandonou / Jean-Marie da Silva	6; 3	7^{8} 6^{6}

=== Azerbaijan vs. Congo ===
Azerbaijan
2
Field Club, Nicosia, Cyprus
24 May 1997

Congo
1

			1	2	3
1	(Azerbaijan) (Republic of the Congo)	Dmitri Zarubin; Martial Banguid	3; 6	6; 1	6; 0
2	(Azerbaijan) (Republic of the Congo)	Igor Borisov; Alain Bemba	2; 6	1; 6
3	(Azerbaijan) (Republic of the Congo)	Igor Borisov / Dmitri Zarubin; Martial Banguid / Alain Bemba	6; 2	6; 3

=== Tunisia vs. Zambia ===
Tunisia
2
Field Club, Nicosia, Cyprus
24 May 1997

Zambia
1

			1	2	3
1	(Tunisia) (Zambia)	Sami Sidia; Sidney Bwalya	6; 2	7; 5
2	(Tunisia) (Zambia)	Walid Jallali; Lighton Ndefwai-Muchinda	6; 1	6; 3
3	(Tunisia) (Zambia)	Selim Ben Hadjali / Walid Jallali; Sidney Bwalya / Kachinga Sinkala	6; 4	4; 6	4; 6

=== Cyprus vs. Tunisia ===
Cyprus
1
Field Club, Nicosia, Cyprus
25 May 1997

Tunisia
2

			1	2	3
1	(Cyprus) (Tunisia)	Marinos Baghdatis; Sami Sidia	6; 1	4; 6	4; 6
2	(Cyprus) (Tunisia)	Demetrios Leontis; Walid Jallali	6; 3	6; 1
3	(Cyprus) (Tunisia)	Demetrios Leontis / Neoclis Neocleous; Walid Jallali / Sami Sidia	4; 6	3; 6

=== Azerbaijan vs. Benin ===
Azerbaijan
0
Field Club, Nicosia, Cyprus
25 May 1997

Benin
3

			1	2	3
1	(Azerbaijan) (Benin)	Farid Jafarov; Alphonse Gandonou	0; 6	0; 6
2	(Azerbaijan) (Benin)	Dmitri Zarubin; Christophe Pognon	1; 6	3; 6
3	(Azerbaijan) (Benin)	Igor Borisov / Raouf Eybazov; Alphonse Gandonou / Jean-Marie da Silva				w/o

=== Congo vs. Zambia ===
Congo
0
Field Club, Nicosia, Cyprus
25 May 1997

Zambia
3

			1	2	3
1	(Republic of the Congo) (Zambia)	Pagnol Madzou; Sidney Bwalya	0; 6	0; 6
2	(Republic of the Congo) (Zambia)	Chatrian Gnitou; Lighton Ndefwai-Muchinda	0; 6	1; 6
3	(Republic of the Congo) (Zambia)	Martial Banguid / Chatrian Gnitou; Lawrence Chileshe / Kachinga Sinkala	2; 6	4; 6
