= 1999 Davis Cup Europe/Africa Zone Group III – Zone A =

International tennis competition

The Europe/Africa Zone was one of the three zones of the regional Davis Cup competition in 1999.

In the Europe/Africa Zone there were four different tiers, called groups, in which teams competed against each other to advance to the upper tier. The top two teams in Group III advanced to the Europe/Africa Zone Group II in 2000, whereas the bottom two teams were relegated to the Europe/Africa Zone Group IV in 2000.

== Participating nations ==
- Algeria
- Benin
- Bosnia and Herzegovina
- Egypt
- Ghana
- Luxembourg
- Nigeria
- Tunisia

=== Draw ===
- Venue: Gezira Sporting Club, Cairo, Egypt
- Date: 24–28 February

Group A

	LUX	TUN	GHA	ALG	RR; W–L	Match; W–L	Set; W–L	Standings
Luxembourg		3–0	3–0	3–0	3–0	9–0 (100%)	18–4 (82%)	1
Tunisia	0–3		2–1	2–1	2–1	4–5 (44%)	11–11 (50%)	2
Ghana	0–3	1–2		2–1	1–2	3–6 (33%)	10–12 (45%)	3
Algeria	0–3	1–2	1–2		0–3	2–7 (22%)	4–16 (20%)	4

Group B

	EGY	BIH	BEN	NGR	RR; W–L	Match; W–L	Set; W–L	Standings
Egypt		3–0	3–0	3–0	3–0	9–0 (100%)	18–1 (95%)	1
Bosnia and Herzegovina	0–3		3–0	2–1	2–1	5–4 (56%)	12–9 (57%)	2
Benin	0–3	0–3		2–1	1–2	2–7 (22%)	4–15 (21%)	3
Nigeria	0–3	1–2	1–2		0–3	2–7 (22%)	6–15 (29%)	4

1st to 4th place play-offs

3rd-4th play-off
A1	Bosnia and Herzegovina	2
A2	Tunisia	0

Semifinals
A1	Luxembourg	2
B2	Bosnia and Herzegovina	0
A2	Tunisia	0
B1	Egypt	3

Final
A1	Luxembourg	0
B1	Egypt	3

5th to 8th place play-offs

7th-8th play-off
A3	Ghana	1
A4	Algeria	2

5th-8th play-offs
A3	Ghana	1
B4	Nigeria	2
A4	Algeria	1
B3	Benin	2

5th-6th play-off
B4	Nigeria	2
B3	Benin	1

=== Final standings ===
Rank	Team
1	Egypt
2	Luxembourg
3	Bosnia and Herzegovina
4	Tunisia
5	Nigeria
6	Benin
7	Algeria
8	Ghana

- Egypt and Luxembourg promoted to Group II in 2000.
- Algeria and Ghana relegated to Group IV in 2000.

== Round robin ==
=== Group A ===
==== Algeria vs. Tunisia ====
Algeria
1
Gezira Sporting Club, Cairo, Egypt
24 February 1999

Tunisia
2

			1	2	3
1	(Algeria) (Tunisia)	Khereddine Bounifa; Souheil Zekri	1; 6	1; 6
2	(Algeria) (Tunisia)	Abdelhak Hameurlaine; Walid Jallali	7; 5	2; 6	6; 4
3	(Algeria) (Tunisia)	Khereddine Bounifa / Abdelhak Hameurlaine; Walid Jallali / Souheil Zekri	1; 6	0; 6

==== Ghana vs. Luxembourg ====
Ghana
0
Gezira Sporting Club, Cairo, Egypt
24 February 1999

Luxembourg
3

			1	2	3
1	(Ghana) (Luxembourg)	Isaac Donkor; Johny Goudenbour	2; 6	6; 4	2; 6
2	(Ghana) (Luxembourg)	Franklyn Ofori; Pascal Schaul	6; 4	2; 6	1; 6
3	(Ghana) (Luxembourg)	Courage Anyidoho / Gunther Darkey; Gilles Kremer / Mike Scheidweiler	6^{0} 7^{7}	2; 6

==== Algeria vs. Luxembourg ====
Algeria
0
Gezira Sporting Club, Cairo, Egypt
25 February 1999

Luxembourg
3

			1	2	3
1	(Algeria) (Luxembourg)	Nabil Dob; Johny Goudenbour	1; 6	0; 6
2	(Algeria) (Luxembourg)	Abdelhak Hameurlaine; Pascal Schaul	3; 6	4; 6
3	(Algeria) (Luxembourg)	Sid-Ali Akkal / Nabil Dob; Gilles Kremer / Mike Scheidweiler	2; 6	6^{3} 7^{7}

==== Ghana vs. Tunisia ====
Ghana
1
Gezira Sporting Club, Cairo, Egypt
25 February 1999

Tunisia
2

			1	2	3
1	(Ghana) (Tunisia)	Isaac Donkor; Souheil Zekri	6; 3	3; 6	2; 6
2	(Ghana) (Tunisia)	Franklyn Ofori; Walid Jallali	6^{5} 7^{7}	5; 7
3	(Ghana) (Tunisia)	Gunther Darkey / Franklyn Ofori; Walid Jallali / Karim Jelassi	6; 2	6; 2

==== Algeria vs. Ghana ====
Algeria
1
Gezira Sporting Club, Cairo, Egypt
26 February 1999

Ghana
2

			1	2	3
1	(Algeria) (Ghana)	Sid-Ali Akkal; Gunther Darkey	3; 6	6; 4	7; 5
2	(Algeria) (Ghana)	Abdelhak Hameurlaine; Franklyn Ofori	3; 6	6^{6} 7^{8}
3	(Algeria) (Ghana)	Sid-Ali Akkal / Abdelhak Hameurlaine; Gunther Darkey / Franklyn Ofori	1; 6	1; 6

==== Luxembourg vs. Tunisia ====
Luxembourg
3
Gezira Sporting Club, Cairo, Egypt
26 February 1999

Tunisia
0

			1	2	3
1	(Luxembourg) (Tunisia)	Gilles Kremer; Souheil Zekri	4; 6	6; 3	6; 1
2	(Luxembourg) (Tunisia)	Pascal Schaul; Walid Jallali	6; 4	6; 3
3	(Luxembourg) (Tunisia)	Johny Goudenbour / Mike Scheidweiler; Walid Jallali / Souheil Zekri	3; 6	7^{7} 6^{2}	6; 2

=== Group B ===
==== Egypt vs. Bosnia and Herzegovina ====
Egypt
3
Gezira Sporting Club, Cairo, Egypt
24 February 1999

Bosnia and Herzegovina
0

			1	2	3
1	(Egypt) (Bosnia and Herzegovina)	Karim Maamoun; Haris Bašalić	2; 6	6; 1	6; 3
2	(Egypt) (Bosnia and Herzegovina)	Amr Ghoneim; Meride Zahirović	7; 5	6; 2
3	(Egypt) (Bosnia and Herzegovina)	Amr Ghoneim / Karim Maamoun; Igor Ibrisbegović / Aljoša Pirić	6; 3	6; 2

==== Benin vs. Nigeria ====
Benin
2
Gezira Sporting Club, Cairo, Egypt
24 February 1999

Nigeria
1

			1	2	3
1	(Benin) (Nigeria)	Alphonse Gandonou; Ganiyu Adenekan	6; 2	3; 6	7; 5
2	(Benin) (Nigeria)	Christophe Pognon; Jonathan Igbinovia	6; 2	6; 2
3	(Benin) (Nigeria)	Jean-Marie da Silva / Alphonse Gandonou; Jonathan Igbinovia / Yakubu Suleiman	3; 6	4; 6

==== Egypt vs. Benin ====
Egypt
3
Gezira Sporting Club, Cairo, Egypt
25 February 1999

Benin
0

			1	2	3
1	(Egypt) (Benin)	Hisham Hemeda; Sourou Gandonou	6; 0	6; 1
2	(Egypt) (Benin)	Amr Ghoneim; Christophe Pognon	6; 3	6; 1
3	(Egypt) (Benin)	Gehad El Deeb / Karim Maamoun; Alphonse Gandonou / Sourou Gandonou	6; 2	6; 3

==== Bosnia and Herzegovina vs. Nigeria ====
Bosnia and Herzegovina
2
Gezira Sporting Club, Cairo, Egypt
25 February 1999

Nigeria
1

			1	2	3
1	(Bosnia and Herzegovina) (Nigeria)	Igor Ibrisbegović; Yakubu Suleiman	4; 6	6; 0	6; 2
2	(Bosnia and Herzegovina) (Nigeria)	Haris Bašalić; Jonathan Igbinovia	6; 4	6; 3
3	(Bosnia and Herzegovina) (Nigeria)	Igor Ibrisbegović / Aljoša Pirić; Ganiyu Adenekan / Jonathan Igbinovia	3; 6	6; 2	2; 6

==== Egypt vs. Nigeria ====
Egypt
3
Gezira Sporting Club, Cairo, Egypt
26 February 1999

Nigeria
0

			1	2	3
1	(Egypt) (Nigeria)	Hisham Hemeda; Ganiyu Adenekan	6; 3	6; 1
2	(Egypt) (Nigeria)	Karim Maamoun; Jonathan Igbinovia	6; 2	6; 2
3	(Egypt) (Nigeria)	Gehad El Deeb / Amr Ghoneim; Ganiyu Adenekan / Jonathan Igbinovia	6; 4	7^{8} 6^{6}

==== Benin vs. Bosnia and Herzegovina ====
Benin
0
Gezira Sporting Club, Cairo, Egypt
26 February 1999

Bosnia and Herzegovina
3

			1	2	3
1	(Benin) (Bosnia and Herzegovina)	Alphonse Gandonou; Haris Bašalić	0; 6	1; 6
2	(Benin) (Bosnia and Herzegovina)	Christophe Pognon; Meride Zahirović	4; 6	1; 6
3	(Benin) (Bosnia and Herzegovina)	Jean-Marie da Silva / Sourou Gandonou; Igor Ibrisbegović / Aljoša Pirić	3; 6	4; 6

== 1st to 4th place play-offs ==
=== Semifinals ===
==== Bosnia and Herzegovina vs. Luxembourg ====
Bosnia and Herzegovina
0
Gezira Sporting Club, Cairo, Egypt
27 February 1999

Luxembourg
2

			1	2	3
1	(Bosnia and Herzegovina) (Luxembourg)	Haris Bašalić; Johny Goudenbour	6^{2} 7^{7}	4; 6
2	(Bosnia and Herzegovina) (Luxembourg)	Meride Zahirović; Pascal Schaul	5; 7	4; 6
3	(Bosnia and Herzegovina) (Luxembourg)					not played

==== Egypt vs. Tunisia ====
Egypt
3
Gezira Sporting Club, Cairo, Egypt
27 February 1999

Tunisia
0

			1	2	3
1	(Egypt) (Tunisia)	Hisham Hemeda; Souheil Zekri	6; 1	6; 0
2	(Egypt) (Tunisia)	Amr Ghoneim; Walid Jallali	6; 2	1; 6	7; 5
3	(Egypt) (Tunisia)	Amr Ghoneim / Karim Maamoun; Aref Jallali / Karim Jelassi	6; 2	6; 0

=== Final ===
==== Egypt vs. Luxembourg ====
Egypt
3
Gezira Sporting Club, Cairo, Egypt
28 February 1999

Luxembourg
0

			1	2	3
1	(Egypt) (Luxembourg)	Karim Maamoun; Gilles Kremer	7; 5	6; 4
2	(Egypt) (Luxembourg)	Amr Ghoneim; Pascal Schaul	6; 4	6; 3
3	(Egypt) (Luxembourg)	Amr Ghoneim / Karim Maamoun; Gilles Kremer / Mike Scheidweiler	6; 4	6; 4

=== 3rd to 4th play-off ===
==== Bosnia and Herzegovina vs. Tunisia ====
Bosnia and Herzegovina
2
Gezira Sporting Club, Cairo, Egypt
28 February 1999

Tunisia
0

			1	2	3
1	(Bosnia and Herzegovina) (Tunisia)	Igor Ibrisbegović; Souheil Zekri	5; 7	6; 0	6; 1
2	(Bosnia and Herzegovina) (Tunisia)	Meride Zahirović; Walid Jallali	5; 7	6; 2	6; 1
3	(Bosnia and Herzegovina) (Tunisia)					not played

== 5th to 8th place play-offs ==
=== 5th to 8th play-offs ===
==== Ghana vs. Nigeria ====
Ghana
1
Gezira Sporting Club, Cairo, Egypt
27 February 1999

Nigeria
2

			1	2	3
1	(Ghana) (Nigeria)	Gunther Darkey; Ganiyu Adenekan	1; 6	2; 6
2	(Ghana) (Nigeria)	Franklyn Ofori; Jonathan Igbinovia	3; 6	7; 5	6; 3
3	(Ghana) (Nigeria)	Gunther Darkey / Franklyn Ofori; Ganiyu Adenekan / Jonathan Igbinovia	3; 6	4; 6

==== Algeria vs. Benin ====
Algeria
1
Gezira Sporting Club, Cairo, Egypt
27 February 1999

Benin
2

			1	2	3
1	(Algeria) (Benin)	Nabil Dob; Alphonse Gandonou	0; 6	0; 6
2	(Algeria) (Benin)	Abdelhak Hameurlaine; Christophe Pognon	6^{7} 7^{9}	6; 0	6; 1
3	(Algeria) (Benin)	Sid-Ali Akkal / Abdelhak Hameurlaine; Jean-Marie da Silva / Alphonse Gandonou	3; 6	4; 6

=== 5th to 6th play-off ===
==== Benin vs. Nigeria ====
Benin
1
Gezira Sporting Club, Cairo, Egypt
28 February 1999

Nigeria
2

			1	2	3
1	(Benin) (Nigeria)	Jean-Marie da Silva; Ikponwmosa Amadin	2; 6	4; 6
2	(Benin) (Nigeria)	Christophe Pognon; Jonathan Igbinovia	6; 1	3; 6	6; 1
3	(Benin) (Nigeria)	Jean-Marie da Silva / Christophe Pognon; Ganiyu Adenekan / Jonathan Igbinovia	2; 6	6^{3} 7^{7}

=== 7th to 8th play-off ===
==== Algeria vs. Ghana ====
Algeria
2
Gezira Sporting Club, Cairo, Egypt
28 February 1999

Ghana
1

			1	2	3
1	(Algeria) (Ghana)	Sid-Ali Akkal; Courage Anyidoho	2; 6	6^{6} 7^{8}
2	(Algeria) (Ghana)	Abdelhak Hameurlaine; Gunther Darkey	6; 4	6; 3
3	(Algeria) (Ghana)	Sid-Ali Akkal / Abdelhak Hameurlaine; Gunther Darkey / Isaac Donkor	6; 4	6; 3
