= 1994 Davis Cup Europe/Africa Zone Group III – Zone A =

International tennis competition

Zone A of the 1994 Davis Cup Europe/Africa Group III was one of two zones in the Europe/Africa Group III of the 1994 Davis Cup. 10 teams competed across two pools in a round robin competition, with the top team in each pool advancing to Group II in 1995.

== Participating nations ==
- Algeria
- Belarus
- Benin
- Cameroon
- Djibouti
- Georgia
- Ivory Coast
- San Marino
- Togo
- Zambia

=== Draw ===
- Venue: Hôtel Ivoire, Abidjan, Ivory Coast
- Date: 4–8 May

Group A

	CIV	GEO	SMR	ZAM	DJI	RR; W–L	Match; W–L	Set; W–L	Standings
Ivory Coast		3–0	3–0	3–0	3–0	4–0	12–0 (100%)	24–1 (96%)	1
Georgia	0–3		2–1	3–0	3–0	3–1	8–4 (67%)	15–9 (63%)	2
San Marino	0–3	1–2		2–1	3–0	2–2	6–6 (50%)	14–12 (54%)	3
Zambia	0–3	0–3	1–2		3–0	1–3	4–8 (33%)	7–16 (30%)	4
Djibouti	0–3	0–3	0–3	0–3		0–4	0–12 (0%)	1–23 (4%)	5

Group B

	BLR	CMR	ALG	BEN	TOG	RR; W–L	Match; W–L	Set; W–L	Standings
Belarus		2–1	2–1	3–0	3–0	4–0	10–2 (83%)	20–5 (80%)	1
Cameroon	1–2		2–1	2–1	2–1	3–1	7–5 (58%)	16–12 (57%)	2
Algeria	1–2	1–2		3–0	3–0	2–2	8–4 (67%)	17–11 (61%)	3
Benin	0–3	1–2	0–3		2–1	1–3	3–9 (25%)	7–19 (27%)	4
Togo	0–3	1–2	0–3	1–2		0–4	2–10 (17%)	7–20 (26%)	5

- Ivory Coast and Belarus promoted to Group II in 1995.

== Group A ==
=== Djibouti vs. Georgia ===
Djibouti
0
Hôtel Ivoire, Abidjan, Ivory Coast
4 May 1994

Georgia
3

			1	2	3
1	(Djibouti) (Georgia (country))	Kaireh Ghirdon; Anatoli Akhaladze	0; 6	1; 6
2	(Djibouti) (Georgia (country))	Chamsan Nasser-Saeed; David Gogilashvili	0; 6	0; 6
3	(Djibouti) (Georgia (country))	Abdou-Mohammed Ahmed / Abdou-Salam Youssef; Anatoli Akhaladze / Josef Siamashvili	2; 6	0; 6

=== San Marino vs. Zambia ===
San Marino
2
Hôtel Ivoire, Abidjan, Ivory Coast
4 May 1994

Zambia
1

			1	2	3
1	(San Marino) (Zambia)	Massimiliano Rosti; Mambo Njovu	6; 0	6; 1
2	(San Marino) (Zambia)	Domenico Vicini; Lighton Ndefwai-Muchinda	6; 4	6; 4
3	(San Marino) (Zambia)	Christian Forcellini / Gabriel Francini; Lighton Ndefwai-Muchinda / Mambo Njovu	4; 6	6; 3	7; 9

=== Ivory Coast vs. Djibouti ===
Ivory Coast
3
Hôtel Ivoire, Abidjan, Ivory Coast
5 May 1994

Djibouti
0

			1	2	3
1	(Ivory Coast) (Djibouti)	Claude N'Goran; Kaireh Ghirdon	6; 0	6; 0
2	(Ivory Coast) (Djibouti)	Clément N'Goran; Chamsan Nasser-Saeed	6; 0	6; 1
3	(Ivory Coast) (Djibouti)	Ilou Lonfo / Nouhoun Sangaré; Abdou-Mohammed Ahmed / Abdou-Salam Youssef	6; 0	6; 1

=== Georgia vs. San Marino ===
Georgia
2
Hôtel Ivoire, Abidjan, Ivory Coast
5 May 1994

San Marino
1

			1	2	3
1	(Georgia (country)) (San Marino)	Anatoli Akhaladze; Massimiliano Rosti	7; 5	6; 1
2	(Georgia (country)) (San Marino)	David Gogilashvili; Domenico Vicini	4; 6	2; 6
3	(Georgia (country)) (San Marino)	Anatoli Akhaladze / Josef Siamashvili; Gabriel Francini / Domenico Vicini	4; 6	6; 3	6; 4

=== Ivory Coast vs. Georgia ===
Ivory Coast
3
Hôtel Ivoire, Abidjan, Ivory Coast
6 May 1994

Georgia
0

			1	2	3
1	(Ivory Coast) (Georgia (country))	Claude N'Goran; Anatoli Akhaladze	6; 0	6; 1
2	(Ivory Coast) (Georgia (country))	Clément N'Goran; Josef Siamashvili	4; 6	6; 1	6; 2
3	(Ivory Coast) (Georgia (country))	Ilou Lonfo / Nouhoun Sangaré; Anatoli Akhaladze / Levan Guelachvili	6; 4	6; 4

=== Djibouti vs. Zambia ===
Djibouti
0
Hôtel Ivoire, Abidjan, Ivory Coast
6 May 1994

Zambia
3

			1	2	3
1	(Djibouti) (Zambia)	Kaireh Ghirdon; Mambo Njovu	6; 4	3; 6	6; 8
2	(Djibouti) (Zambia)	Chamsan Nasser-Saeed; Lighton Ndefwai-Muchinda	0; 6	0; 6
3	(Djibouti) (Zambia)	Abdou-Mohammed Ahmed / Abdou-Salam Youssef; Lighton Ndefwai-Muchinda / Mambo Njovu	1; 6	0; 3		retired

=== Ivory Coast vs. Zambia ===
Ivory Coast
3
Hôtel Ivoire, Abidjan, Ivory Coast
7 May 1994

Zambia
0

			1	2	3
1	(Ivory Coast) (Zambia)	Claude N'Goran; Mambo Njovu	6; 0	6; 1
2	(Ivory Coast) (Zambia)	Clément N'Goran; Lighton Ndefwai-Muchinda	6; 2	6; 1
3	(Ivory Coast) (Zambia)	Ilou Lonfo / Nouhoun Sangaré; Lighton Ndefwai-Muchinda / Mambo Njovu	6; 4	6; 3

=== Djibouti vs. San Marino ===
Djibouti
0
Hôtel Ivoire, Abidjan, Ivory Coast
7 May 1994

San Marino
3

			1	2	3
1	(Djibouti) (San Marino)	Abdou-Salam Youssef; Gabriel Francini	0; 6	0; 6
2	(Djibouti) (San Marino)	Kaireh Ghirdon; Massimiliano Rosti	0; 6	0; 6
3	(Djibouti) (San Marino)	Abdou-Mohammed Ahmed / Chamsan Nasser-Saeed; Christian Forcellini / Domenico Vicini	0; 6	1; 6

=== Ivory Coast vs. San Marino ===
Ivory Coast
3
Hôtel Ivoire, Abidjan, Ivory Coast
8 May 1994

San Marino
0

			1	2	3
1	(Ivory Coast) (San Marino)	Claude N'Goran; Gabriel Francini	6; 1	6; 1
2	(Ivory Coast) (San Marino)	Clément N'Goran; Domenico Vicini	6; 3	6; 3
3	(Ivory Coast) (San Marino)	Ilou Lonfo / Nouhoun Sangaré; Gabriel Francini / Massimiliano Rosti	6; 4	7^{7} 6^{4}

=== Georgia vs. Zambia ===
Georgia
3
Hôtel Ivoire, Abidjan, Ivory Coast
8 May 1994

Zambia
0

			1	2	3
1	(Georgia (country)) (Zambia)	Anatoli Akhaladze; Mambo Njovu	6; 1	6; 0
2	(Georgia (country)) (Zambia)	Josef Siamashvili; Lighton Ndefwai-Muchinda	6; 2	6; 0
3	(Georgia (country)) (Zambia)	Levan Guelachvili / David Gogilashvili; Lighton Ndefwai-Muchinda / Mambo Njovu				w/o

== Group B ==
=== Algeria vs. Belarus ===
Algeria
1
Hôtel Ivoire, Abidjan, Ivory Coast
4 May 1994

Belarus
2

			1	2	3
1	(Algeria) (Belarus)	Mohammed Mahmoudi; Sergei Skakun	1; 6	2; 6
2	(Algeria) (Belarus)	Abdelhak Hameurlaine; Max Mirnyi	7; 5	7; 5
3	(Algeria) (Belarus)	Noujeim Hakimi / Abdelhak Hameurlaine; Alexander Shvets / Sergei Skakun	2; 6	2; 6

=== Benin vs. Cameroon ===
Benin
1
Hôtel Ivoire, Abidjan, Ivory Coast
4 May 1994

Cameroon
2

			1	2	3
1	(Benin) (Cameroon)	Christophe Pognon; Lionel Kemajou	4; 6	2; 6
2	(Benin) (Cameroon)	Alphonse Gandonou; Angelin Mvogo	6; 4	6; 2
3	(Benin) (Cameroon)	Jean-Marie da Silva / Alphonse Gandonou; Lionel Kemajou / Angelin Mvogo	1; 6	6; 4	4; 6

=== Algeria vs. Togo ===
Algeria
3
Hôtel Ivoire, Abidjan, Ivory Coast
5 May 1994

Togo
0

			1	2	3
1	(Algeria) (Togo)	Noureddine Mahmoudi; Didier Kunkel	4; 6	6; 2	6; 0
2	(Algeria) (Togo)	Abdelhak Hameurlaine; Jean-Kome Loglo	6; 4	6; 3
3	(Algeria) (Togo)	Noujeim Hakimi / Mohammed Mahmoudi; Ali Agnamba / Olivier Akli	6; 3	3; 6	6; 4

=== Belarus vs. Benin ===
Belarus
3
Hôtel Ivoire, Abidjan, Ivory Coast
5 May 1994

Benin
0

			1	2	3
1	(Belarus) (Benin)	Vladimir Voltchkov; Christophe Pognon	7^{7} 6^{0}	6; 3
2	(Belarus) (Benin)	Alexander Shvets; Alphonse Gandonou	6; 2	6; 1
3	(Belarus) (Benin)	Max Mirnyi / Sergei Skakun; Jean-Marie da Silva / Alphonse Gandonou	6; 1	6; 2

=== Algeria vs. Cameroon ===
Algeria
1
Hôtel Ivoire, Abidjan, Ivory Coast
6 May 1994

Cameroon
2

			1	2	3
1	(Algeria) (Cameroon)	Noureddine Mahmoudi; Lionel Kemajou	1; 6	2; 6
2	(Algeria) (Cameroon)	Abdelhak Hameurlaine; Angelin Mvogo	6; 1	5; 7	6; 1
3	(Algeria) (Cameroon)	Noujeim Hakimi / Mohammed Mahmoudi; Lionel Kemajou / Angelin Mvogo	6; 3	4; 6	4; 6

=== Belarus vs. Togo ===
Belarus
3
Hôtel Ivoire, Abidjan, Ivory Coast
6 May 1994

Togo
0

			1	2	3
1	(Belarus) (Togo)	Sergei Skakun; Didier Kunkel	6; 0	6; 2
2	(Belarus) (Togo)	Alexander Shvets; Jean-Kome Loglo	6; 1	6; 1
3	(Belarus) (Togo)	Max Mirnyi / Vladimir Voltchkov; Didier Kunkel / Jean-Kome Loglo	6; 4	7^{7} 6^{4}

=== Algeria vs. Benin ===
Algeria
3
Hôtel Ivoire, Abidjan, Ivory Coast
7 May 1994

Benin
0

			1	2	3
1	(Algeria) (Benin)	Mohammed Mahmoudi; Christophe Pognon	6; 3	6; 1
2	(Algeria) (Benin)	Abdelhak Hameurlaine; Alphonse Gandonou	6; 3	6; 0
3	(Algeria) (Benin)	Abdelhak Hameurlaine / Noureddine Mahmoudi; Robert Adidji / Jean-Marie da Silva	6; 0	6; 2

=== Cameroon vs. Togo ===
Cameroon
2
Hôtel Ivoire, Abidjan, Ivory Coast
7 May 1994

Togo
1

			1	2	3
1	(Cameroon) (Togo)	Lionel Kemajou; Didier Kunkel	6; 4	7^{7} 6^{2}
2	(Cameroon) (Togo)	Angelin Mvogo; Jean-Kome Loglo	6; 4	6; 1
3	(Cameroon) (Togo)	Jules Ekono / Simplice Meng; Ali Agnamba / Olivier Akli	4; 6	4; 6

=== Belarus vs. Cameroon ===
Belarus
2
Hôtel Ivoire, Abidjan, Ivory Coast
8 May 1994

Cameroon
1

			1	2	3
1	(Belarus) (Cameroon)	Sergei Skakun; Lionel Kemajou	6; 1	6; 4
2	(Belarus) (Cameroon)	Alexander Shvets; Angelin Mvogo	3; 6	1; 6
3	(Belarus) (Cameroon)	Max Mirnyi / Sergei Skakun; Lionel Kemajou / Angelin Mvogo	6^{5} 7^{7}	6; 0	6; 3

=== Benin vs. Togo ===
Benin
2
Hôtel Ivoire, Abidjan, Ivory Coast
8 May 1994

Togo
1

			1	2	3
1	(Benin) (Togo)	Christophe Pognon; Ali Agnamba	6; 1	6; 3
2	(Benin) (Togo)	Alphonse Gandonou; Jean-Kome Loglo	1; 6	6; 2	6; 3
3	(Benin) (Togo)	Robert Adidji / Jean-Marie da Silva; Olivier Akli / Jean-Kome Loglo	5; 7	3; 6
