= 2002 Davis Cup Europe/Africa Zone Group III – Zone A =

International tennis competition

The Europe/Africa Zone was one of the three zones of the regional Davis Cup competition in 2002.

In the Europe/Africa Zone there were four different tiers, called groups, in which teams competed against each other to advance to the upper tier. Group III was split into two tournaments. One tournament was held in Arka TC, Gdynia, Poland, May 8–12, while the other was held in Antalya, Turkey, April 3–7.

== Format ==
Zambia withdrew from the Gdynia tournament and relegated to the Europe/Africa Zone Group IV in 2003. The seven remaining teams in the Gdynia tournament were split into two pools and played in a round-robin format. The top two teams of each pool advanced to the promotion pool, from which the two top teams were promoted to the Europe/Africa Zone Group II in 2003. The remaining teams in each group from the preliminary round were relegated into the relegation pool, from which the bottom team relegated to the Europe/Africa Zone Group IV in 2003.

== Pool A ==
	Pool A	POL	TUN	CYP	MKD
1	Poland (3–0)		2–1	3–0	3–0
2	Tunisia (1–1)	1–2		2–1	1–2
3	Cyprus (1–1)	0–3	1–2		2–1
4	North Macedonia (1–1)	0–3	2–1	1–2	

=== Poland vs. Cyprus ===
Poland
3
Arka TC, Gdynia, Poland
8 May 2002
Clay

Cyprus
0

			1	2	3
1	(Poland) (Cyprus)	Bartłomiej Dąbrowski; Dinos Pavlou	6; 0	6; 0
2	(Poland) (Cyprus)	Mariusz Fyrstenberg; Marcos Baghdatis	4; 6	6; 3	6; 2
3	(Poland) (Cyprus)	Bartłomiej Dąbrowski / Łukasz Kubot; Marcos Baghdatis / Petros Baghdatis	6; 4	7^{7} 6^{3}

=== North Macedonia vs. Tunisia ===
North Macedonia
2
Arka TC, Gdynia, Poland
8 May 2002
Clay

Tunisia
1

			1	2	3
1	(North Macedonia) (Tunisia)	Zoran Ševčenko; Haythem Abid	6; 3	6; 2
2	(North Macedonia) (Tunisia)	Predrag Rusevski; Walid Jallali	1; 6	0; 6
3	(North Macedonia) (Tunisia)	Predrag Rusevski / Zoran Ševčenko; Issam Jellali / Walid Jallali	6; 3	6; 3

=== Poland vs. North Macedonia ===
Poland
3
Arka TC, Gdynia, Poland
9 May 2002
Clay

North Macedonia
0

			1	2	3
1	(Poland) (North Macedonia)	Bartłomiej Dąbrowski; Kristian Mitrovski	6; 1	6; 0
2	(Poland) (North Macedonia)	Mariusz Fyrstenberg; Predrag Rusevski	6; 4	6; 2
3	(Poland) (North Macedonia)	Łukasz Kubot / Filip Urban; Dimitar Grabul / Predrag Rusevski	6; 2	6; 3

=== Cyprus vs. Tunisia ===
Cyprus
1
Arka TC, Gdynia, Poland
9 May 2002
Clay

Tunisia
2

			1	2	3
1	(Cyprus) (Tunisia)	Dinos Pavlou; Haythem Abid	2; 6	2; 6
2	(Cyprus) (Tunisia)	Marcos Baghdatis; Walid Jallali	5; 7	2; 6
3	(Cyprus) (Tunisia)	Marcos Baghdatis / Petros Baghdatis; Haythem Abid / Walid Jallali	6; 4	2; 6	6; 2

=== Poland vs. Tunisia ===
Poland
2
Arka TC, Gdynia, Poland
10 May 2002
Clay

Tunisia
1

			1	2	3
1	(Poland) (Tunisia)	Bartłomiej Dąbrowski; Haythem Abid	6; 2	6; 1
2	(Poland) (Tunisia)	Mariusz Fyrstenberg; Walid Jallali	5; 7	4; 6
3	(Poland) (Tunisia)	Bartłomiej Dąbrowski / Łukasz Kubot; Haythem Abid / Malek Jaziri	6; 3	6; 4

=== Cyprus vs. North Macedonia ===
Cyprus
2
Arka TC, Gdynia, Poland
10 May 2002
Clay

North Macedonia
1

			1	2	3
1	(Cyprus) (North Macedonia)	Dinos Pavlou; Zoran Ševčenko	6; 4	6; 3
2	(Cyprus) (North Macedonia)	Marcos Baghdatis; Predrag Rusevski	7; 5	6; 1
3	(Cyprus) (North Macedonia)	Marcos Baghdatis / Petros Baghdatis; Predrag Rusevski / Zoran Ševčenko	7; 5	3; 6	5; 7

== Pool B ==
	Pool B	EST	MAD	MRI
1	Estonia (2–0)		2–1	3–0
2	Madagascar (1–1)	1–2		3–0
3	Mauritius (0–2)	0–3	0–3	

=== Mauritius vs. Madagascar ===
Mauritius
0
Arka TC, Gdynia, Poland
8 May 2002
Clay

Madagascar
3

			1	2	3
1	(Mauritius) (Madagascar)	Ananda Sawmynaden; Donne-Dubert Radison	0; 6	1; 6
2	(Mauritius) (Madagascar)	Jean-Marcel Bourgault du Coudray; Alexis Rafidison	3; 6	6^{1} 7^{7}
3	(Mauritius) (Madagascar)	Jean-Marcel Bourgault du Coudray / Ananda Sawmynaden; Donne-Dubert Radison / Jean-Marc Randriamanalina	7^{8} 6^{6}	2; 6	1; 6

=== Estonia vs. Mauritius ===
Estonia
3
Arka TC, Gdynia, Poland
9 May 2002
Clay

Mauritius
0

			1	2	3
1	(Estonia) (Mauritius)	Andrei Luzgin; Ananda Sawmynaden	6; 3	6; 1
2	(Estonia) (Mauritius)	Rene Busch; Jean-Marcel Bourgault du Coudray	6; 2	6; 2
3	(Estonia) (Mauritius)	Andres Angerjärv / Ivar Troost; Jean-Marcel Bourgault du Coudray / Ananda Sawmynaden	6; 1	6; 4

=== Estonia vs. Madagascar ===
Estonia
2
Arka TC, Gdynia, Poland
10 May 2002
Clay

Madagascar
1

			1	2	3
1	(Estonia) (Madagascar)	Andrei Luzgin; Donne-Dubert Radison	6; 4	6; 4
2	(Estonia) (Madagascar)	Rene Busch; Alexis Rafidison	0; 6	2; 6
3	(Estonia) (Madagascar)	Andrei Luzgin / Ivar Troost; Alexis Rafidison / Jean-Marc Randriamanalina	1; 6	6; 3	7; 5

== Promotion pool ==
The top two teams from each of Pools A and B advanced to the Promotion pool. Results and points from games against the opponent from the preliminary round were carried forward.

(scores in italics carried over from Groups)

	1st–4th Play-off	POL	TUN	EST	MAD
1	Poland (3–0)		2–1	3–0	3–0
2	Tunisia (2–1)	1–2		2–1	3–0
3	Estonia (1–2)	0–3	1–2		2–1
4	Madagascar (0–3)	0–3	0–3	1–2	

Poland and Tunisia promoted to Group II in 2003.

=== Poland vs. Madagascar ===
Poland
3
Arka TC, Gdynia, Poland
11 May 2002
Clay

Madagascar
0

			1	2	3
1	(Poland) (Madagascar)	Bartłomiej Dąbrowski; Donne-Dubert Radison	6; 0	6; 0
2	(Poland) (Madagascar)	Łukasz Kubot; Alexis Rafidison	6; 2	6; 0
3	(Poland) (Madagascar)	Mariusz Fyrstenberg / Filip Urban; Donne-Dubert Radison / Jean-Marc Randriamanalina	7; 5	6; 2

=== Tunisia vs. Estonia ===
Tunisia
2
Arka TC, Gdynia, Poland
11 May 2002
Clay

Estonia
1

			1	2	3
1	(Tunisia) (Estonia)	Haythem Abid; Andrei Luzgin	3; 6	6; 3	4; 6
2	(Tunisia) (Estonia)	Walid Jallali; Rene Busch	6; 3	6; 1
3	(Tunisia) (Estonia)	Issam Jellali / Walid Jallali; Andrei Luzgin / Ivar Troost	4; 6	6; 3	18; 16

=== Poland vs. Estonia ===
Poland
3
Arka TC, Gdynia, Poland
12 May 2002
Clay

Estonia
0

			1	2	3
1	(Poland) (Estonia)	Bartłomiej Dąbrowski; Andres Angerjärv	6; 0	6; 0
2	(Poland) (Estonia)	Łukasz Kubot; Ivar Troost	6; 3	6; 2
3	(Poland) (Estonia)	Mariusz Fyrstenberg / Filip Urban; Andres Angerjärv / Andrei Luzgin	6; 4	6; 0

=== Tunisia vs. Madagascar ===
Tunisia
3
Arka TC, Gdynia, Poland
12 May 2002
Clay

Madagascar
0

			1	2	3
1	(Tunisia) (Madagascar)	Haythem Abid; Jean-Marc Randriamanalina	6; 4	7^{7} 6^{5}
2	(Tunisia) (Madagascar)	Walid Jallali; Donne-Dubert Radison	6; 0	6; 1
3	(Tunisia) (Madagascar)	Issam Jellali / Malek Jaziri; Donne-Dubert Radison / Jean-Marc Randriamanalina	6; 1	6; 2

== Relegation pool ==
The bottom two teams from Pool A and the bottom team from Pool B were placed in the relegation group. Results and points from games against the opponent from the preliminary round were carried forward.

(scores in italics carried over from Groups)

	5th–7th Play-off	CYP	MKD	MRI
1	Cyprus (2–0)		2–1	3–0
2	North Macedonia (1–1)	1–2		3–0
3	Mauritius (0–2)	0–3	0–3	

Mauritius relegated to Group IV in 2005.

=== Mauritius vs. North Macedonia ===
Mauritius
0
Arka TC, Gdynia, Poland
11 May 2002
Clay

North Macedonia
3

			1	2	3
1	(Mauritius) (North Macedonia)	Ananda Sawmynaden; Zoran Ševčenko	1; 6	1; 6
2	(Mauritius) (North Macedonia)	Jean-Marcel Bourgault du Coudray; Predrag Rusevski	4; 6	6^{4} 7^{7}
3	(Mauritius) (North Macedonia)	Jean-Marcel Bourgault du Coudray / Ananda Sawmynaden; Dimitar Grabul / Kristian Mitrovski	4; 6	0; 6

=== Mauritius vs. Cyprus ===
Mauritius
0
Arka TC, Gdynia, Poland
12 May 2002
Clay

Cyprus
3

			1	2	3
1	(Mauritius) (Cyprus)	Ananda Sawmynaden; Dinos Pavlou	2; 6	3; 6
2	(Mauritius) (Cyprus)	Jean-Marcel Bourgault du Coudray; Marcos Baghdatis	4; 6	1; 6
3	(Mauritius) (Cyprus)	Ananda Sawmynaden / Arnaud Serret; Petros Baghdatis / Eleftherios Christou	1; 6	1; 6

== Final standings ==
Rank	Team
1	Poland
2	Tunisia
3	Estonia
4	Madagascar
5	Cyprus
6	North Macedonia
7	Mauritius

- Poland and Tunisia promoted to Group II in 2003.
- Mauritius relegated to Group IV in 2003.
- Zambia withdrew from the tournament and relegated to Group IV in 2003.
