= 1992 Davis Cup Europe/Africa Zone Group III =

International tennis competition

The Europe/Africa Zone was one of the three zones of the regional Davis Cup competition in 1992.

In the Europe/Africa Zone there were three different tiers, called groups, in which teams competed against each other to advance to the upper tier. Winners in Group III advanced to the Europe/Africa Zone Group II in 1993. All other teams remained in Group III.

== Participating nations ==
- Algeria
- Cameroon
- Congo
- Senegal
- South Africa
- Tunisia

=== Draw ===
- Venue: Tennis Club de Tunis, Tunis, Tunisia
- Date: 29 April–3 May

	RSA	SEN	ALG	CMR	TUN	CGO	RR; W–L	Match; W–L	Set; W–L	Standings
South Africa		3–0	3–0	3–0	3–0	3–0	5–0	15–0 (100%)	30–1 (97%)	1
Senegal	0–3		2–1	3–0	3–0	3–0	4–1	11–4 (73%)	24–8 (75%)	2
Algeria	0–3	1–2		2–0	2–1	3–0	3–2	8–6 (57%)	16–15 (52%)	3
Cameroon	0–3	0–3	0–2		2–1	2–1	2–3	4–10 (29%)	9–22 (29%)	4
Tunisia	0–3	0–3	1–2	1–2		3–0	1–4	5–10 (33%)	11–20 (35%)	5
Congo	0–3	0–3	0–3	1–2	0–3		0–5	1–14 (7%)	4–28 (13%)	6

- South Africa, Senegal, Algeria and Cameroon promoted to Group II in 1993.

== Results ==
=== Tunisia vs. Algeria ===
Tunisia
1
Tennis Club de Tunis, Tunis, Tunisia
29–30 April 1992

Algeria
2

			1	2	3
1	(Tunisia) (Algeria)	Adel Lahdhiri; Abdelhak Hameurlaine	5; 7	2; 6
2	(Tunisia) (Algeria)	Souheil Zekri; Reda Galou	4; 6	1; 6
3	(Tunisia) (Algeria)	Selim Ben Hadjali / Souheil Zekri; Reda Galou / Abdelhak Hameurlaine	6; 4	7; 5

=== Congo vs. Senegal ===
Congo
0
Tennis Club de Tunis, Tunis, Tunisia
29 April 1992

Senegal
3

			1	2	3
1	(Republic of the Congo) (Senegal)	Alain Bemba; Thierno Ly	3; 6	3; 6
2	(Republic of the Congo) (Senegal)	Christian Bemba; Yahiya Doumbia	0; 6	0; 6
3	(Republic of the Congo) (Senegal)	Christian Bemba / Crépin Ossombi; Abou Berthé / Yahiya Doumbia	2; 6	2; 6

=== Cameroon vs. South Africa ===
Cameroon
0
Tennis Club de Tunis, Tunis, Tunisia
29 April 1992

South Africa
3

			1	2	3
1	(Cameroon) (South Africa)	Lionel Kemajou; Christo van Rensburg	3; 6	0; 6
2	(Cameroon) (South Africa)	Angelin Mvogo; Wayne Ferreira	5; 7	2; 6
3	(Cameroon) (South Africa)	Lionel Kemajou / Joseph Oyebog; Christo van Rensburg / Danie Visser	5; 7	0; 6

=== Tunisia vs. Senegal ===
Tunisia
0
Tennis Club de Tunis, Tunis, Tunisia
30 April 1992

Senegal
3

			1	2	3
1	(Tunisia) (Senegal)	Adel Lahdhiri; Abou Berthé	2; 6	4; 6
2	(Tunisia) (Senegal)	Souheil Zekri; Yahiya Doumbia	2; 6	2; 6
3	(Tunisia) (Senegal)	Selim Ben Hadjali / Souheil Zekri; Yahiya Doumbia / Thierno Ly	2; 6	3; 6

=== Algeria vs. South Africa ===
Algeria
0
Tennis Club de Tunis, Tunis, Tunisia
30 April 1992

South Africa
3

			1	2	3
1	(Algeria) (South Africa)	Abdelhak Hameurlaine; Christo van Rensburg	6^{3} 7^{7}	5; 7
2	(Algeria) (South Africa)	Reda Galou; Wayne Ferreira	3; 6	2; 6
3	(Algeria) (South Africa)	Reda Galou / Samir Tounsi; Wayne Ferreira / Danie Visser	1; 6	3; 6

=== Congo vs. Cameroon ===
Congo
1
Tennis Club de Tunis, Tunis, Tunisia
30 April 1992

Cameroon
2

			1	2	3
1	(Republic of the Congo) (Cameroon)	Alain Bemba; Lionel Kemajou	6; 4	6; 3
2	(Republic of the Congo) (Cameroon)	Christian Bemba; Angelin Mvogo	2; 6	2; 6
3	(Republic of the Congo) (Cameroon)	Alain Bemba / Christian Bemba; Lionel Kemajou / Angelin Mvogo	6; 2	4; 6	4; 6

=== Tunisia vs. Congo ===
Tunisia
3
Tennis Club de Tunis, Tunis, Tunisia
1 May 1992

Congo
0

			1	2	3
1	(Tunisia) (Republic of the Congo)	Adel Lahdhiri; Alain Bemba	6; 2	6; 4
2	(Tunisia) (Republic of the Congo)	Souheil Zekri; Christian Bemba	6; 2	6; 2
3	(Tunisia) (Republic of the Congo)	Selim Ben Hadjali / Souheil Zekri; Alain Bemba / Crépin Ossombi	6; 1	6; 2

=== Algeria vs. Cameroon ===
Algeria
2
Tennis Club de Tunis, Tunis, Tunisia
1 May 1992

Cameroon
0

			1	2	3
1	(Algeria) (Cameroon)	Abdelhak Hameurlaine; Lionel Kemajou	6; 1	4; 6	6; 1
2	(Algeria) (Cameroon)	Reda Galou; Angelin Mvogo	6; 0	6; 3
3	(Algeria) (Cameroon)	Abdelhak Hameurlaine / Samir Tounsi; Lionel Kemajou / Joseph Oyebog				not played

=== South Africa vs. Senegal ===
South Africa
3
Tennis Club de Tunis, Tunis, Tunisia
1–2 May 1992

Senegal
0

			1	2	3
1	(South Africa) (Senegal)	Christo van Rensburg; Abou Berthé	6; 1	6; 1
2	(South Africa) (Senegal)	Wayne Ferreira; Yahiya Doumbia	6; 4	3; 6	6; 2
3	(South Africa) (Senegal)	Wayne Ferreira / Christo van Rensburg; Abou Berthé / Yahiya Doumbia	6; 1	6; 2

=== Tunisia vs. South Africa ===
Tunisia
0
Tennis Club de Tunis, Tunis, Tunisia
2 May 1992

South Africa
3

			1	2	3
1	(Tunisia) (South Africa)	Selim Ben Hadjali; Danie Visser	3; 6	3; 6
2	(Tunisia) (South Africa)	Souheil Zekri; Wayne Ferreira	3; 6	1; 6
3	(Tunisia) (South Africa)	Selim Ben Hadjali / Souheil Zekri; Christo van Rensburg / Danie Visser	1; 6	1; 6

=== Algeria vs. Congo ===
Algeria
3
Tennis Club de Tunis, Tunis, Tunisia
2 May 1992

Congo
0

			1	2	3
1	(Algeria) (Republic of the Congo)	Abdelhak Hameurlaine; Alain Bemba	6; 1	6; 1
2	(Algeria) (Republic of the Congo)	Reda Galou; Christian Bemba	6; 1	6; 4
3	(Algeria) (Republic of the Congo)	Abdelhak Hameurlaine / Samir Tounsi; Christian Bemba / Crépin Ossombi	6; 3	6^{6} 7^{8}	6; 2

=== Cameroon vs. Senegal ===
Cameroon
0
Tennis Club de Tunis, Tunis, Tunisia
2 May 1992

Senegal
3

			1	2	3
1	(Cameroon) (Senegal)	Joseph Oyebog; Abou Berthé	1; 6	4; 6
2	(Cameroon) (Senegal)	Angelin Mvogo; Yahiya Doumbia	3; 6	4; 6
3	(Cameroon) (Senegal)	Lionel Kemajou / Joseph Oyebog; Yahiya Doumbia / Thierno Ly	3; 6	2; 6

=== Tunisia vs. Cameroon ===
Tunisia
1
Tennis Club de Tunis, Tunis, Tunisia
3 May 1992

Cameroon
2

			1	2	3
1	(Tunisia) (Cameroon)	Selim Ben Hadjali; Lionel Kemajou	6; 2	4; 6	4; 6
2	(Tunisia) (Cameroon)	Souheil Zekri; Angelin Mvogo	3; 6	3; 6
3	(Tunisia) (Cameroon)	Selim Ben Hadjali / Souheil Zekri; Lionel Kemajou / Joseph Oyebog	6; 4	6; 4

=== Algeria vs. Senegal ===
Algeria
1
Tennis Club de Tunis, Tunis, Tunisia
3 May 1992

Senegal
2

			1	2	3
1	(Algeria) (Senegal)	Samir Tounsi; Abou Berthé	4; 6	2; 6
2	(Algeria) (Senegal)	Abdelhak Hameurlaine; Yahiya Doumbia	1; 6	2; 6
3	(Algeria) (Senegal)	Abdelhak Hameurlaine / Samir Tounsi; Abou Berthé / Thierno Ly	7^{7} 6^{3}	4; 6	6; 4

=== Congo vs. South Africa ===
Congo
0
Tennis Club de Tunis, Tunis, Tunisia
3 May 1992

South Africa
3

			1	2	3
1	(Republic of the Congo) (South Africa)	Alain Bemba; Christo van Rensburg	1; 6	1; 6
2	(Republic of the Congo) (South Africa)	Christian Bemba; Wayne Ferreira	0; 6	2; 6
3	(Republic of the Congo) (South Africa)	Christian Bemba / Crépin Ossombi; Wayne Ferreira / Danie Visser	2; 6	1; 6
