= Emin Ağayev (tennis) =

Azerbaijani tennis player

- Full name: Emin Ağayev
- Country (sports): Azerbaijan
- Born: 14 May 1979 (age 45); Tashkent, Uzbek SSR
- Plays: Right-handed
- Prize money: $97,733

Singles
- Career record: 0–1
- Career titles: 0
- Highest ranking: No. 247 (21 June 2004)

Doubles
- Highest ranking: No. 290 (20 October 2003)

Emin Ağayev (born 14 May 1979) is a former professional tennis player from Azerbaijan.

== Biography ==
Ağayev was born in the Uzbek city of Tashkent, then part of the Soviet Union, but represented Azerbaijan in his tennis career. As a youngster on the juniors circuit, he was ranked in the world's top 50 and made the boys' doubles semi-finals of the 1997 French Open, with Israeli Andy Ram. He turned professional in the 1999 season. In 2002, he qualified for the main draw of his only ATP Tour level tournament, the RCA Championships, held in Indianapolis. He came up against 13th seed Michel Kratochvil in the first round and lost in straight sets. In 2003, he beat Richard Gasquet at a Challenger tournament in Istanbul, got to the final round of qualifying for the US Open and won a Challenger doubles title in Helsinki. As the most-capped player for the Azerbaijan Davis Cup team, he holds a number of records, including most singles wins (19) and most overall wins (30), from a total of 25 ties.

== Challenger titles ==
=== Doubles: (1) ===
No.	Year	Tournament	Surface	Partner	Opponents	Score
1.	2003	Helsinki, Finland	Clay	(United States) Alex Bogomolov Jr.	(Finland) Lassi Ketola (Finland) Timo Nieminen	7–6^{(13–11),}, 4–6, 6–3
