= Sudan Davis Cup team =

Sports team

The Sudan Davis Cup team was a team that represented Sudan in Davis Cup tennis competition. The team was governed by the Sudan Lawn Tennis Association. They have not competed since 2001.

== History ==
Sudan competed in its first Davis Cup in 1994. Their best result was seventh in Group III in their debut year.

== Current team (2022) ==
- Mohamed Abdalla
- Hussam Ali
- Khalid Derar
- Noor Mandour

== See also ==
- Davis Cup
