= Tunisia Davis Cup team =

Davis Cup team representing Tunisia

Tunisia
- Captain: Fares Zaier
- Nations Ranking: 55 ▲1 (20 September 2021)
- Colors: Red & White
- First year: 1982
- Years played: 30
- Ties played (W–L): 97 (44–53)
- Best finish: Europe/Africa Zone Group II; First round
- Most total wins: Walid Jallali (39–28)
- Most singles wins: Walid Jallali (26–13)
- Most doubles wins: Walid Jallali (13–15)
- Best doubles team: Mohamed Haythem Abid & Malek Jaziri (6–2)
- Most ties played: Walid Jallali (40)
- Most years played: Malek Jaziri (12)

The Tunisia Davis Cup team represents Tunisia in Davis Cup tennis competition and are governed by the Fédération Tunisienne de Tennis.

Tunisia currently competes in Africa Zone Group III.

== History ==
Tunisia competed in its first Davis Cup in 1982.

Tunisia was suspended from Davis Cup play for 2014, because the Tunisian Tennis Federation was found to have ordered Malek Jaziri not to compete against an Israeli, Amir Weintraub. Before the suspension, Tunisia was assigned to the Europe/Africa Zone of Group III.

== Current team (2022) ==
- Skander Mansouri
- Moez Echargui
- Aziz Dougaz
- Malek Jaziri
- Aziz Ouakaa

== See also ==
- Davis Cup
- Tunisia Billie Jean King Cup team
