= Zambia Davis Cup team =

National tennis team

The Zambia Davis Cup team represents Zambia in Davis Cup tennis competition and are governed by the Zambia Lawn Tennis Association. They have not competed since 2013. Some of the members are Webster Munyenyembe, Henry Banda, Sidney Bwalya and, Lawrence Chileshe

== History ==
Zambia competed in its first Davis Cup in 1990. Their best result was reaching the African Group II quarterfinals in 1991.

== Last team (2013) ==
- Edgar Kazembe
- Nkumbu Chonya
- Kombe Mabo
- Henry Banda

== See also ==
- Davis Cup
