= Azerbaijan Davis Cup team =

National tennis team

The Azerbaijan men's national tennis team represents Azerbaijan in Davis Cup tennis competition and are governed by the Azerbaijan Tennis Federation. They have not competed since 2013.

Their best finish is fourth in Group III in 2003.

== History ==
Azerbaijan competed in its first Davis Cup in 1996. Azerbaijani players previously represented the Soviet Union.

== Current Team (2022) ==
- Tamerlan Azizov
- Kanan Gasimov (Junior player)
- Rasul Gojayev
- Arif Guliyev
- Imran Abdulla

== See also ==
- Davis Cup
- Azerbaijan Billie Jean King Cup team
