= Noureddine Mahmoudi =

Algerian tennis player

- Country (sports): Algeria
- Born: 27 June 1973

Singles
- Career record: 16–6

Doubles
- Career record: 16–6
Medal record
Mediterranean Games
Silver medal – second place	2001 Tunis	Doubles

Noureddine Mahmoudi (born 27 June 1973) is a former professional tennis player from Algeria.

A 3-time national champion, Mahmoudi played in a total of 35 Davis Cup ties for Algeria between 1993 and 2003. In 2001, he lost a tight five-setter to then teenager Marcos Baghdatis, who represented Cyprus.

He is a son of Abdeslam Mahmoudi.
