= Abdelhak Hameurlaïne =

Algerian tennis player (born 1972)

- Country (sports): Algeria
- Born: 19 March 1972

Singles
- Career record: 35–20

Doubles
- Career record: 8–18
Medal record
Mediterranean Games
Silver medal – second place	2001 Tunis	Doubles
Islamic Solidarity Games
Silver medal – second place	2005 Mecca	Team
Bronze medal – third place	2005 Mecca	Doubles
African Games
Bronze medal – third place	2007 Algiers	Singles

Abdelhak Hameurlaïne (born 19 March 1972) is a former professional tennis player from Algeria. He learnt the sport at Tennis club d'Hydra, in Algiers Province.

A record 19-time national champion, Hameurlaïne played in a total of 55 Davis Cup ties for Algeria between 1990 and 2011, and is a recipient of the Davis Cup Commitment Award.

Nicknamed Hakou, his sister Lamia is also a former professional tennis player.
