= Walid Jallali =

Tunisian tennis player (born 1978)

- Country (sports): Tunisia
- Born: 30 June 1978 (age 46)
- Prize money: $40,419

Singles
- Career record: 26–13 (Davis Cup)
- Highest ranking: No. 546 (16 Aug 2004)

Doubles
- Career record: 13–15 (Davis Cup)
- Highest ranking: No. 493 (12 Jun 2006)
Medal record
All-Africa Games
Bronze medal – third place	2007 Algiers	Doubles

Walid Jallali (born 30 June 1978), also known as Oualid Jallali, is a Tunisian former professional tennis player.

Jallali spent his professional career primarily on the ITF Futures and satellite circuits, reaching a career best singles world ranking of 546. He won three singles and 12 doubles titles at Futures level.

From 1996 to 2008, Jallali participated in 40 Davis Cup ties for Tunisia and played 67 rubbers in total. In 2003, Tunisia returned to Group II after a 10-year absence and travelled to Hillerød to play Denmark, where he won the opening rubber of the tie, over Rasmus Nørby in five sets. By the time he retired he had amassed a team record 39 wins, of which 26 came in singles rubbers. His brother, Essam, also played Davis Cup tennis.

Jallali competed for Tunisia in three editions of the Mediterranean Games and was a doubles bronze medalist at the 2007 All-Africa Games, held in Algiers.

As a coach, Jallali had stints captaining Tunisia's Davis Cup team and has toured as the private coach of local players, including Ons Jabeur and Malek Jaziri.
