= Algeria Davis Cup team =

National tennis team

Algeria
- Captain: Abdelhak Hameurlaïne
- Nations Ranking: 78 ▼8
- First year: 1976
- Years played: 31
- Ties played (W–L): 77 (38-39)
- Years in World Group: 0 (0-0)
- Davis Cup titles: 0
- Runners-up: 0
- Best finish: Europe/Africa Zone Group II Round Two - 2004, 2006, 2008
- Most total wins: Abdel-Hak Hameurlaine (37-32)
- Most singles wins: Abdel-Hak Hameurlaine (30-17)
- Most doubles wins: Noureddine Mahmoudi (16-6)
- Best doubles team: Noujeim Hakimi/Noureddine Mahmoudi (9-2)
- Most ties played: Abdel-Hak Hameurlaine (46)
- Most years played: Abdel-Hak Hameurlaine (17)

The Algeria Davis Cup team represents Algeria in Davis Cup tennis competition and are governed by the Fédération Algerienne de Tennis.

Algeria currently compete in Africa Zone Group III.

== History ==
Algeria competed in its first Davis Cup in 1976.

== Current team (2022) ==
- Rayan Ghedjemis
- Samir Hamza Reguig
- Toufik Sahtali
- Aymen Abderrahmene Ali Moussa
- Mohamed Amine Aissa Khelifa

== See also ==
- Davis Cup
- Algeria Billie Jean King Cup team
