= 1997 Davis Cup Europe/Africa Zone Group IV – Zone A =

International tennis competition

The Europe/Africa Zone was one of the three zones of the regional Davis Cup competition in 1997.

In the Europe/Africa Zone there were four different tiers, called groups, in which teams competed against each other to advance to the upper tier. The top two teams in Europe/Africa IV advanced to the Europe/Africa Zone Group III in 1998. All other teams remained in Group IV.

== Participating nations ==
- Botswana
- Djibouti
- Iceland
- Liechtenstein
- Madagascar
- Sudan
- Togo
- Uganda

=== Draw ===
- Venue: Tennis Centre, Gaborone, Botswana
- Date: 19–23 March

Group A

	TOG	LIE	UGA	SUD	RR; W–L	Match; W–L	Set; W–L	Standings
Togo		3–0	3–0	3–0	3–0	9–0 (100%)	18–0 (100%)	1
Liechtenstein	0–3		3–0	3–0	2–1	6–3 (67%)	12–7 (63%)	2
Uganda	0–3	0–3		2–1	1–2	2–7 (22%)	5–14 (26%)	3
Sudan	0–3	0–3	1–2		0–3	1–8 (11%)	2–16 (11%)	4

Group B

	MAD	BOT	ISL	DJI	RR; W–L	Match; W–L	Set; W–L	Standings
Madagascar		2–1	3–0	3–0	3–0	8–1 (89%)	16–2 (89%)	1
Botswana	1–2		2–1	3–0	2–1	6–3 (67%)	11–6 (65%)	2
Iceland	0–3	1–2		3–0	1–2	4–5 (44%)	8–9 (47%)	3
Djibouti	0–3	0–3	0–3		0–3	0–9 (0%)	0–18 (0%)	4

1st to 4th place play-offs

3rd-4th play-off
B2	Botswana	1
A2	Liechtenstein	2

Semifinals
A1	Togo	2
B2	Botswana	1
A2	Liechtenstein	0
B1	Madagascar	3

Final
A1	Togo	1
B1	Madagascar	2

5th to 8th place play-offs

7th-8th play-off
B4	Djibouti	0
B3	Iceland	3

5th-8th play-offs
A3	Uganda	3
B4	Djibouti	0
A4	Sudan	2
B3	Iceland	1

5th-6th play-off
A3	Uganda	2
A4	Sudan	1

=== Final standings ===
Rank	Team
1	Madagascar
2	Togo
3	Liechtenstein
4	Botswana
5	Uganda
6	Sudan
7	Iceland
8	Djibouti

- Madagascar and Togo promoted to Group III in 1998.

== Round robin ==
=== Group A ===
==== Liechtenstein vs. Sudan ====
Liechtenstein
3
Tennis Centre, Gaborone, Botswana
19 March 1997

Sudan
0

			1	2	3
1	(Liechtenstein) (Sudan)	Jürgen Tömördy; Mandour Abdalla	6; 2	6; 3
2	(Liechtenstein) (Sudan)	Stephan Ritter; Asim Omar El-Agraa	6; 2	6; 0
3	(Liechtenstein) (Sudan)	Hartmut Birkner / Roland Büchel; Abbas Jeha / Abdullah Giha	6; 3	6; 3

==== Togo vs. Uganda ====
Togo
3
Tennis Centre, Gaborone, Botswana
19 March 1997

Uganda
0

			1	2	3
1	(Togo) (Uganda)	Kodjo Apeti; Renato Sebbi	6; 2	6; 2
2	(Togo) (Uganda)	Jean-Kome Loglo; John Oduke	6; 1	6; 4
3	(Togo) (Uganda)	Kossi Loglo / Midodji Segbeaya; Christopher Bagala / Renato Sebbi	6; 1	6; 2

==== Liechtenstein vs. Uganda ====
Liechtenstein
3
Tennis Centre, Gaborone, Botswana
20 March 1997

Uganda
0

			1	2	3
1	(Liechtenstein) (Uganda)	Jürgen Tömördy; Erick Ofuyulu	6; 2	6; 3
2	(Liechtenstein) (Uganda)	Stephan Ritter; John Oduke	6; 3	7; 5
3	(Liechtenstein) (Uganda)	Hartmut Birkner / Roland Büchel; Christopher Bagala / Renato Sebbi	7^{7} 6^{4}	4; 6	10; 8

==== Sudan vs. Togo ====
Sudan
0
Tennis Centre, Gaborone, Botswana
20 March 1997

Togo
3

			1	2	3
1	(Sudan) (Togo)	Mandour Abdalla; Kodjo Apeti	5; 7	1; 6
2	(Sudan) (Togo)	Asim Omar El-Agraa; Jean-Kome Loglo	2; 6	0; 6
3	(Sudan) (Togo)	Mandour Abdalla / Abbas Jeha; Kossi Loglo / Midodji Segbeaya	1; 6	5; 7

==== Liechtenstein vs. Togo ====
Liechtenstein
0
Tennis Centre, Gaborone, Botswana
21 March 1997

Togo
3

			1	2	3
1	(Liechtenstein) (Togo)	Roland Büchel; Kodjo Apeti	0; 6	0; 6
2	(Liechtenstein) (Togo)	Hartmut Birkner; Jean-Kome Loglo	2; 6	0; 6
3	(Liechtenstein) (Togo)	Hartmut Birkner / Roland Büchel; Kossi Loglo / Midodji Segbeaya	4; 6	3; 6

==== Sudan vs. Uganda ====
Sudan
1
Tennis Centre, Gaborone, Botswana
21 March 1997

Uganda
2

			1	2	3
1	(Sudan) (Uganda)	Mandour Abdalla; Renato Sebbi	6; 3	6; 1
2	(Sudan) (Uganda)	Asim Omar El-Agraa; John Oduke	1; 6	2; 6
3	(Sudan) (Uganda)	Mandour Abdalla / Asim Omar El-Agraa; John Oduke / Renato Sebbi	5; 7	3; 6

=== Group B ===
==== Botswana vs. Djibouti ====
Botswana
3
Tennis Centre, Gaborone, Botswana
19 March 1997

Djibouti
0

			1	2	3
1	(Botswana) (Djibouti)	Gavin Jeftha; Omar-Awad Mohammed	6; 0	6; 0
2	(Botswana) (Djibouti)	Petrus Molefe; Abdul-Kadar Moussa	6; 0	6; 0
3	(Botswana) (Djibouti)	Michael Judd / Thato Kgosimore; Abdullah Aden / Chamsan Nasser-Saeed	6; 2	6; 1

==== Iceland vs. Madagascar ====
Iceland
0
Tennis Centre, Gaborone, Botswana
19 March 1997

Madagascar
3

			1	2	3
1	(Iceland) (Madagascar)	Einar Sigurgeirsson; Harivony Andrianafetra	0; 6	1; 6
2	(Iceland) (Madagascar)	Gunnar Einarsson; Thierry Rajaobelina	4; 6	4; 6
3	(Iceland) (Madagascar)	Stefán Pálsson / Ólafur Sveinsson; Harivony Andrianafetra / Donne-Dubert Radison	2; 6	0; 6

==== Botswana vs. Madagascar ====
Botswana
1
Tennis Centre, Gaborone, Botswana
20 March 1997

Madagascar
2

			1	2	3
1	(Botswana) (Madagascar)	Gavin Jeftha; Harivony Andrianafetra	2; 6	4; 6
2	(Botswana) (Madagascar)	Petrus Molefe; Thierry Rajaobelina	7^{7} 6^{5}	7; 5
3	(Botswana) (Madagascar)	Thato Kgosimore / Petrus Molefe; Harivony Andrianafetra / Thierry Rajaobelina	1; 6	3; 6

==== Djibouti vs. Iceland ====
Djibouti
0
Tennis Centre, Gaborone, Botswana
20 March 1997

Iceland
3

			1	2	3
1	(Djibouti) (Iceland)	Abdullah Aden; Einar Sigurgeirsson	0; 6	0; 6
2	(Djibouti) (Iceland)	Chamsan Nasser-Saeed; Gunnar Einarsson	0; 6	0; 6
3	(Djibouti) (Iceland)	Omar-Awad Mohammed / Abdul-Kadar Moussa; Gunnar Einarsson / Stefán Pálsson	2; 6	1; 6

==== Botswana vs. Iceland ====
Botswana
2
Tennis Centre, Gaborone, Botswana
21 March 1997

Iceland
1

			1	2	3
1	(Botswana) (Iceland)	Gavin Jeftha; Einar Sigurgeirsson	6; 1	6; 3
2	(Botswana) (Iceland)	Petrus Molefe; Gunnar Einarsson	7^{7} 6^{4}			retired
3	(Botswana) (Iceland)	Michael Judd / Thato Kgosimore; Stefán Pálsson / Einar Sigurgeirsson	6^{4} 7^{7}	3; 6

==== Djibouti vs. Madagascar ====
Djibouti
0
Tennis Centre, Gaborone, Botswana
21 March 1997

Madagascar
3

			1	2	3
1	(Djibouti) (Madagascar)	Abdullah Aden; Jean-Baptiste Rakotondravelo	0; 6	0; 6
2	(Djibouti) (Madagascar)	Omar-Awad Mohammed; Donne-Dubert Radison	0; 6	2; 6
3	(Djibouti) (Madagascar)	Abdul-Kadar Moussa / Chamsan Nasser-Saeed; Donne-Dubert Radison / Jean-Baptiste Rakotondravelo	0; 6	0; 6

== 1st to 4th place play-offs ==
=== Semifinals ===
==== Botswana vs. Togo ====
Botswana
1
Tennis Centre, Gaborone, Botswana
22 March 1997

Togo
2

			1	2	3
1	(Botswana) (Togo)	Gavin Jeftha; Kodjo Apeti	6; 3	6; 4
2	(Botswana) (Togo)	Petrus Molefe; Jean-Kome Loglo	4; 6	5; 7
3	(Botswana) (Togo)	Michael Judd / Thato Kgosimore; Kodjo Apeti / Jean-Kome Loglo	3; 6	4; 6

==== Liechtenstein vs. Madagascar ====
Liechtenstein
0
Tennis Centre, Gaborone, Botswana
22 March 1997

Madagascar
3

			1	2	3
1	(Liechtenstein) (Madagascar)	Jürgen Tömördy; Harivony Andrianafetra	7^{7} 6^{4}	1; 6	2; 6
2	(Liechtenstein) (Madagascar)	Stephan Ritter; Thierry Rajaobelina	4; 6	3; 6
3	(Liechtenstein) (Madagascar)	Hartmut Birkner / Roland Büchel; Donne-Dubert Radison / Jean-Baptiste Rakotondravelo	1; 6	1; 6

=== Final ===
==== Togo vs. Madagascar ====
Togo
1
Tennis Centre, Gaborone, Botswana
23 March 1997

Madagascar
2

			1	2	3
1	(Togo) (Madagascar)	Kodjo Apeti; Harivony Andrianafetra	2; 6	3; 6
2	(Togo) (Madagascar)	Jean-Kome Loglo; Thierry Rajaobelina	6; 2	6; 3
3	(Togo) (Madagascar)	Kodjo Apeti / Jean-Kome Loglo; Harivony Andrianafetra / Thierry Rajaobelina	5; 7	3; 6

=== 3rd to 4th play-off ===
==== Liechtenstein vs. Botswana ====
Liechtenstein
2
Tennis Centre, Gaborone, Botswana
23 March 1997

Botswana
1

			1	2	3
1	(Liechtenstein) (Botswana)	Jürgen Tömördy; Thato Kgosimore	7; 5	6; 3
2	(Liechtenstein) (Botswana)	Stephan Ritter; Petrus Molefe	6; 3	3; 6	0; 6
3	(Liechtenstein) (Botswana)	Stephan Ritter / Jürgen Tömördy; Gavin Jeftha / Michael Judd				w/o

== 5th to 8th place play-offs ==
=== 5th to 8th play-offs ===
==== Uganda vs. Djibouti ====
Uganda
3
Tennis Centre, Gaborone, Botswana
22 March 1997

Djibouti
0

			1	2	3
1	(Uganda) (Djibouti)	Renato Sebbi; Abdullah Aden	6; 0	6; 1
2	(Uganda) (Djibouti)	John Oduke; Omar-Awad Mohammed	6; 0	6; 0
3	(Uganda) (Djibouti)	John Oduke / Renato Sebbi; Abdullah Aden / Omar-Awad Mohammed	6; 0	6; 1

==== Sudan vs. Iceland ====
Sudan
2
Tennis Centre, Gaborone, Botswana
22 March 1997

Iceland
1

			1	2	3
1	(Sudan) (Iceland)	Mandour Abdalla; Stefán Pálsson	6; 2	6; 4
2	(Sudan) (Iceland)	Asim Omar El-Agraa; Gunnar Einarsson	2; 6	7; 5	3; 6
3	(Sudan) (Iceland)	Mandour Abdalla / Abbas Jeha; Stefán Pálsson / Einar Sigurgeirsson	3; 6	6; 2	7; 5

=== 5th to 6th play-off ===
==== Uganda vs. Sudan ====
Uganda
2
Tennis Centre, Gaborone, Botswana
23 March 1997

Sudan
1

			1	2	3
1	(Uganda) (Sudan)	Renato Sebbi; Mandour Abdalla	3; 6	3; 6
2	(Uganda) (Sudan)	John Oduke; Asim Omar El-Agraa	6; 2	6; 2
3	(Uganda) (Sudan)	John Oduke / Renato Sebbi; Mandour Abdalla / Abbas Jeha	6; 4	3; 6	6; 4

=== 7th to 8th play-off ===
==== Djibouti vs. Iceland ====
Djibouti
0
Tennis Centre, Gaborone, Botswana
23 March 1997

Iceland
3

			1	2	3
1	(Djibouti) (Iceland)	Abdullah Aden; Einar Sigurgeirsson	0; 6	2; 6
2	(Djibouti) (Iceland)	Omar-Awad Mohammed; Gunnar Einarsson	3; 6	1; 6
3	(Djibouti) (Iceland)	Abdullah Aden / Omar-Awad Mohammed; Gunnar Einarsson / Einar Sigurgeirsson	1; 6	1; 6
