= 1996 Davis Cup Europe/Africa Zone Group III – Zone B =

International tennis competition

Zone B of the 1996 Davis Cup Europe/Africa Group III was one of two zones in the Europe/Africa Group III of the 1996 Davis Cup. 14 teams competed across two pools in a round robin competition, with the top team in each pool advancing to Group II in 1997. In a move to a four-tier system, the bottom three teams in each pool were reassigned to the new Group IV in 1997; all other teams remained in Group III.

== Participating nations ==
- Botswana
- Bulgaria
- Cameroon
- Congo
- Cyprus
- Djibouti
- Estonia
- Greece
- Ireland
- Kenya
- Moldova
- Monaco
- Togo
- Zambia

=== Draw ===
- Venue: Nairobi Club Ground, Nairobi, Kenya
- Date: 8–14 January

Group A

	IRL	CMR	EST	MDA	CYP	ZAM	DJI	RR; W–L	Match; W–L	Set; W–L	Standings
Ireland		2–1	3–0	3–0	3–0	3–0	3–0	6–0	17–1 (94%)	32–4 (89%)	1
Cameroon	1–2		2–1	2–1	2–1	3–0	3–0	5–1	13–5 (72%)	26–12 (68%)	2
Estonia	0–3	1–2		2–1	3–0	3–0	3–0	4–2	12–6 (67%)	25–15 (63%)	3
Moldova	0–3	1–2	1–2		2–1	2–1	3–0	3–3	9–9 (50%)	21–19 (53%)	4
Cyprus	0–3	1–2	0–3	1–2		3–0	3–0	2–4	8–10 (44%)	19–18 (51%)	5
Zambia	0–3	0–3	0–3	1–2	0–3		3–0	1–5	4–14 (22%)	9–28 (24%)	6
Djibouti	0–3	0–3	0–3	0–3	0–3	0–3		0–6	0–18 (0%)	0–36 (0%)	7

Group B

	GRE	BUL	MON	KEN	BOT	TOG	CGO	RR; W–L	Match; W–L	Set; W–L	Standings
Greece		3–0	1–2	3–0	3–0	3–0	3–0	5–1	16–2 (89%)	33–7 (83%)	1
Bulgaria	0–3		3–0	3–0	3–0	3–0	3–0	5–1	15–3 (83%)	30–10 (75%)	2
Monaco	2–1	0–3		2–1	3–0	3–0	3–0	5–1	13–5 (72%)	27–14 (66%)	3
Kenya	0–3	0–3	1–2		3–0	3–0	3–0	3–3	10–8 (56%)	25–18 (58%)	4
Botswana	0–3	0–3	0–3	0–3		3–0	3–0	2–4	6–12 (33%)	14–25 (36%)	5
Togo	0–3	0–3	0–3	0–3	0–3		3–0	1–5	3–15 (17%)	10–29 (26%)	6
Congo	0–3	0–3	0–3	0–3	0–3	0–3		0–6	0–18 (0%)	0–36 (0%)	7

- Ireland and Greece promoted to Group II in 1997.
- Cyprus, Zambia, Djibouti, Botswana, Togo and Congo assigned to Group IV in 1997.

== Group A ==
=== Cyprus vs. Zambia ===
Cyprus
3
Nairobi Club Ground, Nairobi, Kenya
8 January 1996

Zambia
0

			1	2	3
1	(Cyprus) (Zambia)	Alkis Papamichael; Kachinga Sinkala	6; 3	6; 0
2	(Cyprus) (Zambia)	Demetrios Leontis; Sidney Bwalya	7; 5	6; 3
3	(Cyprus) (Zambia)	Demetrios Leontis / Andreas Morfiadakis; Martin Kombe / Lighton Ndefwai-Muchinda	7^{11} 6^{9}	6; 4

=== Djibouti vs. Ireland ===
Djibouti
0
Nairobi Club Ground, Nairobi, Kenya
8 January 1996

Ireland
3

			1	2	3
1	(Djibouti) (Republic of Ireland)	Abdul-Kadar Moussa; Scott Barron	1; 6	0; 6
2	(Djibouti) (Republic of Ireland)	Chamsan Nasser-Saeed; Owen Casey	2; 6	0; 6
3	(Djibouti) (Republic of Ireland)	Abdullah Aden / Abdul-Kadar Moussa; Eoin Collins / John Doran	0; 6	0; 6

=== Estonia vs. Moldova ===
Estonia
2
Nairobi Club Ground, Nairobi, Kenya
8 January 1996

Moldova
1

			1	2	3
1	(Estonia) (Moldova)	Allar Hint; Evgueni Plougarev	3; 6	2; 6
2	(Estonia) (Moldova)	Rene Busch; Oleg Sinic	6; 0	6; 2
3	(Estonia) (Moldova)	Andrei Luzgin / Alti Vahkal; Evgueni Plougarev / Maxim Savitski	6; 0	6^{8} 7^{10}	6; 3

=== Cameroon vs. Estonia ===
Cameroon
2
Nairobi Club Ground, Nairobi, Kenya
9 January 1996

Estonia
1

			1	2	3
1	(Cameroon) (Estonia)	Angelin Mvogo; Allar Hint	6; 1	6; 1
2	(Cameroon) (Estonia)	Lionel Kemajou; Rene Busch	2; 6	0; 6
3	(Cameroon) (Estonia)	Angelin Mvogo / Joseph Oyebog; Andrei Luzgin / Alti Vahkal	7^{7} 6^{5}	6; 4

=== Cyprus vs. Moldova ===
Cyprus
1
Nairobi Club Ground, Nairobi, Kenya
9 January 1996

Moldova
2

			1	2	3
1	(Cyprus) (Moldova)	Alkis Papamichael; Evgueni Plougarev	3; 6	1; 6
2	(Cyprus) (Moldova)	Demetrios Leontis; Oleg Sinic	4; 6	1; 6
3	(Cyprus) (Moldova)	Demetrios Leontis / Andreas Morfiadakis; Sergei Bougaenko / Evgueni Plougarev	6; 2	6; 2

=== Djibouti vs. Zambia ===
Djibouti
0
Nairobi Club Ground, Nairobi, Kenya
9 January 1996

Zambia
3

			1	2	3
1	(Djibouti) (Zambia)	Abdullah Aden; Kachinga Sinkala	0; 6	0; 6
2	(Djibouti) (Zambia)	Chamsan Nasser-Saeed; Sidney Bwalya	1; 6	0; 6
3	(Djibouti) (Zambia)	Abdul-Kadar Moussa / Chamsan Nasser-Saeed; Martin Kombe / Lighton Ndefwai-Muchinda	1; 6	3; 6

=== Cameroon vs. Moldova ===
Cameroon
2
Nairobi Club Ground, Nairobi, Kenya
10 January 1996

Moldova
1

			1	2	3
1	(Cameroon) (Moldova)	Angelin Mvogo; Evgueni Plougarev	6; 4	6; 3
2	(Cameroon) (Moldova)	Lionel Kemajou; Oleg Sinic	4; 6	4; 6
3	(Cameroon) (Moldova)	Angelin Mvogo / Joseph Oyebog; Maxim Savitski / Oleg Sinic	6; 3	6^{7} 7^{9}	6; 1

=== Cyprus vs. Ireland ===
Cyprus
0
Nairobi Club Ground, Nairobi, Kenya
10 January 1996

Ireland
3

			1	2	3
1	(Cyprus) (Republic of Ireland)	Andreas Morfiadakis; Scott Barron	2; 6	1; 6
2	(Cyprus) (Republic of Ireland)	Alkis Papamichael; Owen Casey	1; 6	4; 6
3	(Cyprus) (Republic of Ireland)	Demetrios Leontis / Andreas Morfiadakis; Owen Casey / Eoin Collins	2; 5			retired

=== Estonia vs. Zambia ===
Estonia
3
Nairobi Club Ground, Nairobi, Kenya
10 January 1996

Zambia
0

			1	2	3
1	(Estonia) (Zambia)	Alti Vahkal; Kachinga Sinkala	6; 0	6; 4
2	(Estonia) (Zambia)	Rene Busch; Sidney Bwalya	6; 2	6; 1
3	(Estonia) (Zambia)	Andrei Luzgin / Alti Vahkal; Martin Kombe / Lighton Ndefwai-Muchinda	6; 4	6; 2

=== Cameroon vs. Ireland ===
Cameroon
1
Nairobi Club Ground, Nairobi, Kenya
11 January 1996

Ireland
2

			1	2	3
1	(Cameroon) (Republic of Ireland)	Angelin Mvogo; Scott Barron	6; 4	6; 1
2	(Cameroon) (Republic of Ireland)	Lionel Kemajou; Owen Casey	1; 6	2; 6
3	(Cameroon) (Republic of Ireland)	Angelin Mvogo / Joseph Oyebog; Owen Casey / Eoin Collins	4; 6	2; 6

=== Djibouti vs. Estonia ===
Djibouti
0
Nairobi Club Ground, Nairobi, Kenya
11 January 1996

Estonia
3

			1	2	3
1	(Djibouti) (Estonia)	Abdul-Kadar Moussa; Alti Vahkal	3; 6	1; 6
2	(Djibouti) (Estonia)	Chamsan Nasser-Saeed; Rene Busch	2; 6	0; 6
3	(Djibouti) (Estonia)	Abdullah Aden / Abdul-Kadar Moussa; Allar Hint / Andrei Luzgin	1; 6	1; 6

=== Moldova vs. Zambia ===
Moldova
2
Nairobi Club Ground, Nairobi, Kenya
11 January 1996

Zambia
1

			1	2	3
1	(Moldova) (Zambia)	Evgueni Plougarev; Kachinga Sinkala	4; 6	3; 6
2	(Moldova) (Zambia)	Oleg Sinic; Sidney Bwalya	6; 4	6; 3
3	(Moldova) (Zambia)	Maxim Savitski / Oleg Sinic; Sidney Bwalya / Kachinga Sinkala	2; 6	6; 3	6; 4

=== Cameroon vs. Cyprus ===
Cameroon
2
Nairobi Club Ground, Nairobi, Kenya
12 January 1996

Cyprus
1

			1	2	3
1	(Cameroon) (Cyprus)	Joseph Oyebog; Alkis Papamichael	6; 3	3; 6	13; 11
2	(Cameroon) (Cyprus)	Angelin Mvogo; Demetrios Leontis	6; 2	6; 4
3	(Cameroon) (Cyprus)	Maurice Fomete / Lionel Kemajou; Demetrios Leontis / Andreas Morfiadakis	2; 6	3; 6

=== Djibouti vs. Moldova ===
Djibouti
0
Nairobi Club Ground, Nairobi, Kenya
12 January 1996

Moldova
3

			1	2	3
1	(Djibouti) (Moldova)	Abdul-Kadar Moussa; Evgueni Plougarev	1; 6	3; 6
2	(Djibouti) (Moldova)	Chamsan Nasser-Saeed; Oleg Sinic	4; 6	1; 6
3	(Djibouti) (Moldova)	Abdul-Kadar Moussa / Chamsan Nasser-Saeed; Evgueni Plougarev / Oleg Sinic	0; 6	1; 6

=== Ireland vs. Zambia ===
Ireland
3
Nairobi Club Ground, Nairobi, Kenya
12 January 1996

Zambia
0

			1	2	3
1	(Republic of Ireland) (Zambia)	Scott Barron; Kachinga Sinkala	6; 3	6; 4
2	(Republic of Ireland) (Zambia)	Owen Casey; Sidney Bwalya	6; 1	6; 0
3	(Republic of Ireland) (Zambia)	Scott Barron / Owen Casey; Martin Kombe / Lighton Ndefwai-Muchinda	6; 1	6; 1

=== Cameroon vs. Djibouti ===
Cameroon
3
Nairobi Club Ground, Nairobi, Kenya
13 January 1996

Djibouti
0

			1	2	3
1	(Cameroon) (Djibouti)	Joseph Oyebog; Abdullah Aden	6; 0	6; 0
2	(Cameroon) (Djibouti)	Lionel Kemajou; Abdul-Kadar Moussa	6; 1	6; 0
3	(Cameroon) (Djibouti)	Maurice Fomete / Angelin Mvogo; Abdullah Aden / Abdul-Kadar Moussa	6; 1	6; 1

=== Cyprus vs. Estonia ===
Cyprus
0
Nairobi Club Ground, Nairobi, Kenya
13 January 1996

Estonia
3

			1	2	3
1	(Cyprus) (Estonia)	Alkis Papamichael; Alti Vahkal	4; 6	7^{7} 6^{4}	3; 6
2	(Cyprus) (Estonia)	Demetrios Leontis; Rene Busch	4; 6	6; 4	2; 6
3	(Cyprus) (Estonia)	Petros Baghdatis / Andreas Morfiadakis; Andrei Luzgin / Alti Vahkal	1; 6	3; 6

=== Ireland vs. Moldova ===
Ireland
3
Nairobi Club Ground, Nairobi, Kenya
13 January 1996

Moldova
0

			1	2	3
1	(Republic of Ireland) (Moldova)	Scott Barron; Evgueni Plougarev	6; 2	6; 3
2	(Republic of Ireland) (Moldova)	Owen Casey; Oleg Sinic	7; 5	3; 6	6; 3
3	(Republic of Ireland) (Moldova)	Owen Casey / Eoin Collins; Maxim Savitski / Oleg Sinic	6; 4	6; 2

=== Cameroon vs. Zambia ===
Cameroon
3
Nairobi Club Ground, Nairobi, Kenya
14 January 1996

Zambia
0

			1	2	3
1	(Cameroon) (Zambia)	Angelin Mvogo; Kachinga Sinkala	6; 2	6; 3
2	(Cameroon) (Zambia)	Lionel Kemajou; Sidney Bwalya	6; 1	6; 4
3	(Cameroon) (Zambia)	Maurice Fomete / Lionel Kemajou; Martin Kombe / Lighton Ndefwai-Muchinda	7; 5	6; 1

=== Cyprus vs. Djibouti ===
Cyprus
3
Nairobi Club Ground, Nairobi, Kenya
14 January 1996

Djibouti
0

			1	2	3
1	(Cyprus) (Djibouti)	Andreas Morfiadakis; Abdullah Aden	6; 0	6; 0
2	(Cyprus) (Djibouti)	Demetrios Leontis; Abdul-Kadar Moussa	6; 1	6; 2
3	(Cyprus) (Djibouti)	Petros Baghdatis / Demetrios Leontis; Abdul-Kadar Moussa / Chamsan Nasser-Saeed	6; 0	6; 1

=== Estonia vs. Ireland ===
Estonia
0
Nairobi Club Ground, Nairobi, Kenya
14 January 1996

Ireland
3

			1	2	3
1	(Estonia) (Republic of Ireland)	Allar Hint; Scott Barron	0; 6	0; 6
2	(Estonia) (Republic of Ireland)	Rene Busch; Owen Casey	1; 6	2; 6
3	(Estonia) (Republic of Ireland)	Andrei Luzgin / Alti Vahkal; Scott Barron / John Doran	6; 4	4; 6	3; 6

== Group B ==
=== Kenya vs. Botswana ===
Kenya
3
Nairobi Club Ground, Nairobi, Kenya
8 January 1996

Botswana
0

			1	2	3
1	(Kenya) (Botswana)	Norbert Oduor; Michael Judd	6; 1	6; 4
2	(Kenya) (Botswana)	Allan Cooper; Gavin Jeftha	6; 4	6; 2
3	(Kenya) (Botswana)	Allan Cooper / Norbert Oduor; Gavin Jeftha / Thato Kgosimore	6; 2	6; 1

=== Bulgaria vs. Monaco ===
Bulgaria
3
Nairobi Club Ground, Nairobi, Kenya
8 January 1996

Monaco
0

			1	2	3
1	(Bulgaria) (Monaco)	Ruslan Rainov; Christophe Bosio	4; 6	6; 3	6; 1
2	(Bulgaria) (Monaco)	Mark Markov; Sébastien Graeff	6; 4	6; 4
3	(Bulgaria) (Monaco)	Ivo Bratanov / Radoslav Radev; Christophe Boggetti / Sébastien Graeff	6; 1	7^{8} 6^{6}

=== Greece vs. Togo ===
Greece
3
Nairobi Club Ground, Nairobi, Kenya
8 January 1996

Togo
0

			1	2	3
1	(Greece) (Togo)	Konstantinos Efraimoglou; Komi Akli	6; 2	6; 1
2	(Greece) (Togo)	Solon Peppas; Jean-Kome Loglo	6; 3	6; 4
3	(Greece) (Togo)	Konstantinos Economidis / Nikos Rovas; Komi Akli / Jean-Kome Loglo	4; 6	6; 3	6; 4

=== Botswana vs. Bulgaria ===
Botswana
0
Nairobi Club Ground, Nairobi, Kenya
9 January 1996

Bulgaria
3

			1	2	3
1	(Botswana) (Bulgaria)	Gavin Jeftha; Radoslav Radev	4; 6	3; 6
2	(Botswana) (Bulgaria)	Thato Kgosimore; Mark Markov	1; 6	4; 6
3	(Botswana) (Bulgaria)	Michael Judd / Thato Kgosimore; Ivo Bratanov / Radoslav Radev	4; 6	4; 6

=== Congo vs. Togo ===
Congo
0
Nairobi Club Ground, Nairobi, Kenya
9 January 1996

Togo
3

			1	2	3
1	(Republic of the Congo) (Togo)	Chatrian Gnitou; Komi Akli	4; 6	1; 6
2	(Republic of the Congo) (Togo)	Alain Bemba; Jean-Kome Loglo	0; 6	2; 6
3	(Republic of the Congo) (Togo)	Alain Bemba / Chatrian Gnitou; Kossi Loglo / Kodjo Sodji	5; 7	3; 6

=== Greece vs. Monaco ===
Greece
1
Nairobi Club Ground, Nairobi, Kenya
9 January 1996

Monaco
2

			1	2	3
1	(Greece) (Monaco)	Konstantinos Efraimoglou; Christophe Bosio	6; 3	6; 4
2	(Greece) (Monaco)	Solon Peppas; Sébastien Graeff	6; 4	4; 6	2; 6
3	(Greece) (Monaco)	Konstantinos Efraimoglou / Solon Peppas; Christophe Boggetti / Sébastien Graeff	6^{6} 7^{8}	6^{3} 7^{7}

=== Kenya vs. Bulgaria ===
Kenya
0
Nairobi Club Ground, Nairobi, Kenya
10 January 1996

Bulgaria
3

			1	2	3
1	(Kenya) (Bulgaria)	Norbert Oduor; Ruslan Rainov	6; 1	3; 6	4; 6
2	(Kenya) (Bulgaria)	Allan Cooper; Mark Markov	3; 6	6; 1	5; 7
3	(Kenya) (Bulgaria)	Balaraman Arun / Devin Shretta; Ivo Bratanov / Radoslav Radev	7^{7} 6^{5}	3; 6	5; 7

=== Botswana vs. Greece ===
Botswana
0
Nairobi Club Ground, Nairobi, Kenya
10 January 1996

Greece
3

			1	2	3
1	(Botswana) (Greece)	Thato Kgosimore; Konstantinos Economidis	2; 6	1; 6
2	(Botswana) (Greece)	Michael Judd; Solon Peppas	3; 6	4; 6
3	(Botswana) (Greece)	Gavin Jeftha / Michael Judd; Konstantinos Efraimoglou / Nikos Rovas	2; 6	2; 6

=== Congo vs. Monaco ===
Congo
0
Nairobi Club Ground, Nairobi, Kenya
10 January 1996

Monaco
3

			1	2	3
1	(Republic of the Congo) (Monaco)	Martial Banguid; Christophe Bosio	2; 6	2; 6
2	(Republic of the Congo) (Monaco)	Chatrian Gnitou; Sébastien Graeff	3; 6	0; 6
3	(Republic of the Congo) (Monaco)	Martial Banguid / Alain Bemba; Christophe Boggetti / Sylvain Skudlarek	1; 6	2; 6

=== Kenya vs. Greece ===
Kenya
0
Nairobi Club Ground, Nairobi, Kenya
11 January 1996

Greece
3

			1	2	3
1	(Kenya) (Greece)	Balaraman Arun; Konstantinos Efraimoglou	0; 6	2; 6
2	(Kenya) (Greece)	Allan Cooper; Solon Peppas	3; 6	4; 6
3	(Kenya) (Greece)	Allan Cooper / Norbert Oduor; Konstantinos Efraimoglou / Solon Peppas	6; 2	6^{7} 7^{9}	4; 6

=== Botswana vs. Congo ===
Botswana
3
Nairobi Club Ground, Nairobi, Kenya
11 January 1996

Congo
0

			1	2	3
1	(Botswana) (Republic of the Congo)	Michael Judd; Martial Banguid	6; 3	6; 1
2	(Botswana) (Republic of the Congo)	Gavin Jeftha; Chatrian Gnitou	6; 2	6; 4
3	(Botswana) (Republic of the Congo)	Michael Judd / Thato Kgosimore; Alain Bemba / Chatrian Gnitou	6; 2	6; 4

=== Monaco vs. Togo ===
Monaco
3
Nairobi Club Ground, Nairobi, Kenya
11 January 1996

Togo
0

			1	2	3
1	(Monaco) (Togo)	Christophe Bosio; Komi Akli	6; 4	6; 0
2	(Monaco) (Togo)	Sébastien Graeff; Jean-Kome Loglo	7^{7} 6^{4}	7^{7} 6^{0}
3	(Monaco) (Togo)	Christophe Boggetti / Sylvain Skudlarek; Kossi Loglo / Kodjo Sodji	6; 3	6; 4

=== Kenya vs. Congo ===
Kenya
3
Nairobi Club Ground, Nairobi, Kenya
12 January 1996

Congo
0

			1	2	3
1	(Kenya) (Republic of the Congo)	Norbert Oduor; Martial Banguid	6; 0	6; 2
2	(Kenya) (Republic of the Congo)	Allan Cooper; Chatrian Gnitou	6; 1	6; 2
3	(Kenya) (Republic of the Congo)	Allan Cooper / Norbert Oduor; Martial Banguid / Alain Bemba	6; 2	6; 0

=== Botswana vs. Togo ===
Botswana
3
Nairobi Club Ground, Nairobi, Kenya
12 January 1996

Togo
0

			1	2	3
1	(Botswana) (Togo)	Michael Judd; Komi Akli	6; 4	6^{3} 7^{7}	8; 6
2	(Botswana) (Togo)	Gavin Jeftha; Jean-Kome Loglo	6; 2	6; 4
3	(Botswana) (Togo)	Michael Judd / Thato Kgosimore; Kossi Loglo / Kodjo Sodji	7^{8} 6^{6}	6; 3

=== Bulgaria vs. Greece ===
Bulgaria
0
Nairobi Club Ground, Nairobi, Kenya
12 January 1996

Greece
3

			1	2	3
1	(Bulgaria) (Greece)	Ruslan Rainov; Konstantinos Efraimoglou	6^{6} 7^{8}	3; 6
2	(Bulgaria) (Greece)	Mark Markov; Solon Peppas	6^{6} 7^{8}	6; 2	5; 7
3	(Bulgaria) (Greece)	Mark Markov / Radoslav Radev; Konstantinos Efraimoglou / Solon Peppas	2; 6	3; 6

=== Kenya vs. Togo ===
Kenya
3
Nairobi Club Ground, Nairobi, Kenya
13 January 1996

Togo
0

			1	2	3
1	(Kenya) (Togo)	Norbert Oduor; Kossi Loglo	4; 6	6; 2	6; 2
2	(Kenya) (Togo)	Allan Cooper; Jean-Kome Loglo	2; 6	6; 4	6; 3
3	(Kenya) (Togo)	Balaraman Arun / Devin Shretta; Jean-Kome Loglo / Kossi Loglo	6; 2	7^{11} 6^{9}

=== Botswana vs. Monaco ===
Botswana
0
Nairobi Club Ground, Nairobi, Kenya
13 January 1996

Monaco
3

			1	2	3
1	(Botswana) (Monaco)	Michael Judd; Sylvain Skudlarek	3; 6	6^{3} 7^{7}
2	(Botswana) (Monaco)	Gavin Jeftha; Christophe Boggetti	3; 6	7^{10} 6^{8}	0; 6
3	(Botswana) (Monaco)	Michael Judd / Thato Kgosimore; Christophe Bosio / Sébastien Graeff	7^{7} 6^{5}	6^{4} 7^{7}	16; 18

=== Bulgaria vs. Congo ===
Bulgaria
3
Nairobi Club Ground, Nairobi, Kenya
13 January 1996

Congo
0

			1	2	3
1	(Bulgaria) (Republic of the Congo)	Radoslav Radev; Martial Banguid	6; 0	6; 1
2	(Bulgaria) (Republic of the Congo)	Ivo Bratanov; Alain Bemba	6; 1	6; 3
3	(Bulgaria) (Republic of the Congo)	Ivo Bratanov / Radoslav Radev; Martial Banguid / Chatrian Gnitou	6; 0	6; 3

=== Kenya vs. Monaco ===
Kenya
1
Nairobi Club Ground, Nairobi, Kenya
14 January 1996

Monaco
2

			1	2	3
1	(Kenya) (Monaco)	Norbert Oduor; Sylvain Skudlarek	6; 4	6; 2
2	(Kenya) (Monaco)	Allan Cooper; Sébastien Graeff	6^{5} 7^{7}	7^{7} 6^{3}	3; 6
3	(Kenya) (Monaco)	Allan Cooper / Norbert Oduor; Christophe Boggetti / Sébastien Graeff	3; 6	4; 6

=== Bulgaria vs. Togo ===
Bulgaria
3
Nairobi Club Ground, Nairobi, Kenya
14 January 1996

Togo
0

			1	2	3
1	(Bulgaria) (Togo)	Radoslav Radev; Kossi Loglo	6; 1	6; 2
2	(Bulgaria) (Togo)	Mark Markov; Jean-Kome Loglo	7^{7} 6^{5}	3; 0		retired
3	(Bulgaria) (Togo)	Mark Markov / Radoslav Radev; Komi Akli / Kossi Loglo	6; 2	6; 3

=== Congo vs. Greece ===
Congo
0
Nairobi Club Ground, Nairobi, Kenya
14 January 1996

Greece
3

			1	2	3
1	(Republic of the Congo) (Greece)	Martial Banguid; Konstantinos Efraimoglou	0; 6	0; 6
2	(Republic of the Congo) (Greece)	Chatrian Gnitou; Solon Peppas	1; 6	1; 6
3	(Republic of the Congo) (Greece)	Alain Bemba / Crépin Ossombi; Konstantinos Economidis / Nikos Rovas	2; 6	0; 6
