= 2000 Davis Cup Europe/Africa Zone Group III – Zone A =

International tennis competition

The Europe/Africa Zone was one of the three zones of the regional Davis Cup competition in 2000.

In the Europe/Africa Zone there were four different tiers, called groups, in which teams competed against each other to advance to the upper tier. The top two teams in Group III advanced to the Europe/Africa Zone Group II in 2001, whereas the bottom two teams were relegated to the Europe/Africa Zone Group IV in 2001.

== Participating nations ==
- Bosnia and Herzegovina
- Botswana
- Georgia
- Malta
- Monaco
- Togo
- Tunisia
- Yugoslavia

=== Draw ===
- Venue: Tennis Club de Tunis, Tunis, Tunisia
- Date: 24–28 May

Group A

	BIH	GEO	TOG	MLT	RR; W–L	Match; W–L	Set; W–L	Standings
Bosnia and Herzegovina		3–0	2–1	1–0	3–0	6–1 (86%)	12–3 (80%)	1
Georgia	0–3		2–1	3–0	2–1	5–4 (56%)	11–11 (50%)	2
Togo	1–2	1–2		3–0	1–2	5–4 (56%)	11–8 (57%)	3
Malta	0–1	0–3	0–3		0–3	0–7 (0%)	2–14 (13%)	4

Group B

	FRY	MON	BOT	TUN	RR; W–L	Match; W–L	Set; W–L	Standings
Yugoslavia		3–0	3–0	2–0	3–0	8–0 (100%)	16–1 (94%)	1
Monaco	0–3		2–0	3–0	2–1	5–3 (63%)	11–7 (61%)	2
Botswana	0–3	0–2		2–1	1–2	2–6 (20%)	5–14 (26%)	3
Tunisia	0–2	0–3	1–2		0–3	1–7 (13%)	5–15 (25%)	4

1st to 4th place play-offs

3rd-4th Play-off
A1	Bosnia and Herzegovina	1
A2	Georgia	2

Semifinals
A1	Bosnia and Herzegovina	1
B2	Monaco	2
A2	Georgia	0
B1	Yugoslavia	3

Final
B2	Monaco	0
B1	Yugoslavia	3

5th to 8th place play-offs

7th-8th Play-off
B4	Tunisia	2
A4	Malta	1

5th-8th Play-offs
A3	Togo	2
B4	Tunisia	1
A4	Malta	0
B3	Botswana	3

5th-6th Play-off
A3	Togo	3
B3	Botswana	0

=== Final standings ===
Rank	Team
1	Yugoslavia
2	Monaco
3	Georgia
4	Bosnia and Herzegovina
5	Togo
6	Botswana
7	Tunisia
8	Malta

- Yugoslavia and Monaco promoted to Group II in 2001.
- Tunisia and Malta relegated to Group IV in 2001.

== Round robin ==
=== Group A ===
==== Togo vs. Bosnia and Herzegovina ====
Togo
1
Tennis Club de Tunis, Tunis, Tunisia
24 May 2000

Bosnia and Herzegovina
2

			1	2	3
1	(Togo) (Bosnia and Herzegovina)	Jean-Kome Loglo; Haris Bašalić	3; 6	1; 6
2	(Togo) (Bosnia and Herzegovina)	Kossi Loglo; Meride Zahirović	0; 6	0; 6
3	(Togo) (Bosnia and Herzegovina)	Komlavi Loglo / Kossi Loglo; Ismar Gorčić / Meride Zahirović	6; 1	7; 5

==== Malta vs. Georgia ====
Malta
0
Tennis Club de Tunis, Tunis, Tunisia
24 May 2000

Georgia
3

			1	2	3
1	(Malta) (Georgia (country))	Marco Cappello; Konstantin Burchuladze	1; 6	1; 6
2	(Malta) (Georgia (country))	Mark Schembri; Irakli Ushangishvili	4; 6	6; 2	4; 6
3	(Malta) (Georgia (country))	Luke Bonello / Matthew Debono; Otar Enukidze / Irakli Ushangishvili	6; 2	4; 6	3; 6

==== Togo vs. Malta ====
Togo
3
Tennis Club de Tunis, Tunis, Tunisia
25 May 2000

Malta
0

			1	2	3
1	(Togo) (Malta)	Komlavi Loglo; Matthew Debono	6; 2	6; 1
2	(Togo) (Malta)	Kossi Loglo; Mark Schembri	6; 3	6; 3
3	(Togo) (Malta)	Komlavi Loglo / Kossi Loglo; Luke Bonello / Matthew Debono	6; 2	6; 1

==== Bosnia and Herzegovina vs. Georgia ====
Bosnia and Herzegovina
3
Tennis Club de Tunis, Tunis, Tunisia
25 May 2000

Georgia
0

			1	2	3
1	(Bosnia and Herzegovina) (Georgia (country))	Haris Bašalić; Konstantin Burchuladze	6; 0	6; 2
2	(Bosnia and Herzegovina) (Georgia (country))	Meride Zahirović; Irakli Ushangishvili	6; 1	6; 2
3	(Bosnia and Herzegovina) (Georgia (country))	Ismar Gorčić / Goran Houdek; Konstantin Burchuladze / Otar Enukidze	6^{2} 7^{7}	6; 1	7; 5

==== Togo vs. Georgia ====
Togo
1
Tennis Club de Tunis, Tunis, Tunisia
26 May 2000

Georgia
2

			1	2	3
1	(Togo) (Georgia (country))	Jean-Kome Loglo; Otar Enukidze	6; 2	6; 2
2	(Togo) (Georgia (country))	Kossi Loglo; Irakli Ushangishvili	2; 6	7^{7} 6^{4}	4; 6
3	(Togo) (Georgia (country))	Komlavi Loglo / Kossi Loglo; David Katcharava / Irakli Ushangishvili	5; 7	2; 6

==== Malta vs. Bosnia and Herzegovina ====
Malta
0
Tennis Club de Tunis, Tunis, Tunisia
26 May 2000

Bosnia and Herzegovina
1

			1	2	3
1	(Malta) (Bosnia and Herzegovina)	Luke Bonello; Haris Bašalić	4; 6	2; 6
2	(Malta) (Bosnia and Herzegovina)					not played
3	(Malta) (Bosnia and Herzegovina)					not played

=== Group B ===
==== Yugoslavia vs. Monaco ====
Yugoslavia
3
Tennis Club de Tunis, Tunis, Tunisia
24 May 2000

Monaco
0

			1	2	3
1	(Federal Republic of Yugoslavia) (Monaco)	Nenad Zimonjić; Emmanuel Heussner	6; 4	3; 6	6; 0
2	(Federal Republic of Yugoslavia) (Monaco)	Dušan Vemić; Christophe Bosio	6; 3	6; 3
3	(Federal Republic of Yugoslavia) (Monaco)	Relja Dulić Fišer / Janko Tipsarević; Christophe Bosio / Emmanuel Heussner	6; 3	7^{7} 6^{3}

==== Botswana vs. Tunisia ====
Botswana
2
Tennis Club de Tunis, Tunis, Tunisia
24 May 2000

Tunisia
1

			1	2	3
1	(Botswana) (Tunisia)	Michael Judd; Chekib Jemai	4; 6	6; 0	11; 9
2	(Botswana) (Tunisia)	Petrus Molefe; Fares Zaier	7; 5	4; 6	2; 6
3	(Botswana) (Tunisia)	Michael Judd / Petrus Molefe; Chekib Jemai / Youssef Miled	6; 2	5; 7	6; 3

==== Yugoslavia vs. Botswana ====
Yugoslavia
3
Tennis Club de Tunis, Tunis, Tunisia
25 May 2000

Botswana
0

			1	2	3
1	(Federal Republic of Yugoslavia) (Botswana)	Relja Dulić Fišer; Lesedi Bewlay	6; 0	6; 1
2	(Federal Republic of Yugoslavia) (Botswana)	Nenad Zimonjić; Petrus Molefe	6; 3	6; 0
3	(Federal Republic of Yugoslavia) (Botswana)	Janko Tipsarević / Dušan Vemić; Michael Judd / Petrus Molefe	6; 4	6; 0

==== Monaco vs. Tunisia ====
Monaco
3
Tennis Club de Tunis, Tunis, Tunisia
25 May 2000

Tunisia
0

			1	2	3
1	(Monaco) (Tunisia)	Emmanuel Heussner; Malek Jaziri	6; 1	6; 2
2	(Monaco) (Tunisia)	Christophe Bosio; Youssef Miled	6; 1	6; 1
3	(Monaco) (Tunisia)	Christophe Bosio / Axel Mellet; Chekib Jemai / Fares Zaier	4; 6	6; 3	6; 4

==== Yugoslavia vs. Tunisia ====
Yugoslavia
2
Tennis Club de Tunis, Tunis, Tunisia
26 May 2000

Tunisia
0

			1	2	3
1	(Federal Republic of Yugoslavia) (Tunisia)	Janko Tipsarević; Chekib Jemai	6; 3	6; 2
2	(Federal Republic of Yugoslavia) (Tunisia)	Nenad Zimonjić; Youssef Miled	6; 4	6; 0
3	(Federal Republic of Yugoslavia) (Tunisia)					not played

==== Monaco vs. Botswana ====
Monaco
2
Tennis Club de Tunis, Tunis, Tunisia
26 May 2000

Botswana
0

			1	2	3
1	(Monaco) (Botswana)	Emmanuel Heussner; Michael Judd	7; 5	6; 4
2	(Monaco) (Botswana)	Christophe Bosio; Petrus Molefe	6; 4	6; 2
3	(Monaco) (Botswana)					not played

== 1st to 4th place play-offs ==
=== Semifinals ===
==== Bosnia and Herzegovina vs. Monaco ====
Bosnia and Herzegovina
1
Tennis Club de Tunis, Tunis, Tunisia
27 May 2000

Monaco
2

			1	2	3
1	(Bosnia and Herzegovina) (Monaco)	Haris Bašalić; Emmanuel Heussner	6; 3	0; 6	6; 8
2	(Bosnia and Herzegovina) (Monaco)	Meride Zahirović; Christophe Bosio	3; 6	6; 1	6; 3
3	(Bosnia and Herzegovina) (Monaco)	Haris Bašalić / Goran Houdek; Christophe Bosio / Emmanuel Heussner	3; 6	6^{7} 7^{9}

==== Georgia vs. Yugoslavia ====
Georgia
0
Tennis Club de Tunis, Tunis, Tunisia
27 May 2000

Yugoslavia
3

			1	2	3
1	(Georgia (country)) (Federal Republic of Yugoslavia)	Konstantin Burchuladze; Nenad Zimonjić	1; 6	3; 6
2	(Georgia (country)) (Federal Republic of Yugoslavia)	Irakli Ushangishvili; Dušan Vemić	3; 6	1; 6
3	(Georgia (country)) (Federal Republic of Yugoslavia)	Konstantin Burchuladze / Otar Enukidze; Relja Dulić Fišer / Janko Tipsarević	2; 6	3; 6

=== Final ===
==== Monaco vs. Yugoslavia ====
Monaco
0
Tennis Club de Tunis, Tunis, Tunisia
28 May 2000

Yugoslavia
3

			1	2	3
1	(Monaco) (Federal Republic of Yugoslavia)	Emmanuel Heussner; Nenad Zimonjić	1; 6	0; 6
2	(Monaco) (Federal Republic of Yugoslavia)	Christophe Bosio; Dušan Vemić	3; 6	1; 6
3	(Monaco) (Federal Republic of Yugoslavia)	Christophe Boggetti / Emmanuel Heussner; Relja Dulić Fišer / Janko Tipsarević	5; 7	2; 6

=== 3rd to 4th play-off ===
==== Bosnia and Herzegovina vs. Georgia ====
Bosnia and Herzegovina
1
Tennis Club de Tunis, Tunis, Tunisia
28 May 2000

Georgia
2

			1	2	3
1	(Bosnia and Herzegovina) (Georgia (country))	Ismar Gorčić; Konstantin Burchuladze	0; 6	2; 6
2	(Bosnia and Herzegovina) (Georgia (country))	Goran Houdek; Irakli Ushangishvili	5; 7	0; 6
3	(Bosnia and Herzegovina) (Georgia (country))	Ismar Gorčić / Goran Houdek; Konstantin Burchuladze / Otar Enukidze	6; 4	6; 2

== 5th to 8th place play-offs ==
=== 5th to 8th play-offs ===
==== Togo vs. Tunisia ====
Togo
2
Tennis Club de Tunis, Tunis, Tunisia
27 May 2000

Tunisia
1

			1	2	3
1	(Togo) (Tunisia)	Komi Adeyo; Chekib Jemai	3; 6	3; 6
2	(Togo) (Tunisia)	Komlavi Loglo; Youssef Miled	6; 2	1; 6	6; 0
3	(Togo) (Tunisia)	Jean-Kome Loglo / Kossi Loglo; Chekib Jemai / Fares Zaier	6; 3	6; 1

==== Botswana vs. Malta ====
Botswana
3
Tennis Club de Tunis, Tunis, Tunisia
27 May 2000

Malta
0

			1	2	3
1	(Botswana) (Malta)	Michael Judd; Matthew Debono	5; 7	6; 2	7; 5
2	(Botswana) (Malta)	Petrus Molefe; Mark Schembri	7^{9} 6^{7}	6; 2
3	(Botswana) (Malta)	Lesedi Bewlay / Karabo Makgale; Luke Bonello / Mark Schembri	6; 1	0; 6	6; 3

=== 5th to 6th play-off ===
==== Botswana vs. Togo ====
Botswana
0
Tennis Club de Tunis, Tunis, Tunisia
28 May 2000

Togo
3

			1	2	3
1	(Botswana) (Togo)	Michael Judd; Jean-Kome Loglo	6^{2} 7^{7}	2; 6
2	(Botswana) (Togo)	Petrus Molefe; Kossi Loglo	6^{4} 7^{7}	0; 6
3	(Botswana) (Togo)	Michael Judd / Karabo Makgale; Komi Adeyo / Komlavi Loglo	3; 6	4; 6

=== 7th to 8th play-off ===
==== Malta vs. Tunisia ====
Malta
1
Tennis Club de Tunis, Tunis, Tunisia
28 May 2000

Tunisia
2

			1	2	3
1	(Malta) (Tunisia)	Luke Bonello; Malek Jaziri	4; 6	6; 3	6; 2
2	(Malta) (Tunisia)	Matthew Debono; Chekib Jemai	5; 7	0; 6
3	(Malta) (Tunisia)	Luke Bonello / Matthew Debono; Chekib Jemai / Fares Zaier	3; 6	6^{3} 7^{7}
