= 1998 Davis Cup Europe/Africa Zone Group IV – Zone A =

International tennis competition

The Europe/Africa Zone was one of the three zones of the regional Davis Cup competition in 1998.

In the Europe/Africa Zone there were four different tiers, called groups, in which teams competed against each other to advance to the upper tier. The top two teams in Group IV advanced to the Europe/Africa Zone Group III in 1999. All other teams remained in Group IV.

== Participating nations ==
- Armenia
- Azerbaijan
- Benin
- Botswana
- Cameroon
- Djibouti
- Sudan
- Uganda

=== Draw ===
- Venue: Lugogo Tennis Club, Kampala, Uganda
- Date: 28 January–1 February

Group A

	ARM	BEN	UGA	DJI	RR; W–L	Match; W–L	Set; W–L	Standings
Armenia		2–1	2–1	2–0	3–0	6–2 (75%)	12–5 (71%)	1
Benin	1–2		2–0	3–0	2–1	6–2 (75%)	13–5 (72%)	2
Uganda	1–2	0–2		3–0	1–2	4–4 (50%)	9–8 (53%)	3
Djibouti	0–2	0–3	0–3		0–3	0–8 (0%)	0–16 (0%)	4

Group B

	CMR	BOT	AZE	SUD	RR; W–L	Match; W–L	Set; W–L	Standings
Cameroon		2–1	2–0	3–0	3–0	7–1 (88%)	15–4 (79%)	1
Botswana	1–2		3–0	2–0	2–1	6–2 (75%)	12–6 (67%)	2
Azerbaijan	0–2	0–3		2–1	1–2	2–6 (25%)	5–13 (28%)	3
Sudan	0–3	0–2	1–2		0–3	1–7 (13%)	5–14 (26%)	4

1st to 4th place play-offs

3rd-4th play-off
B2	Botswana	3
B1	Cameroon	0

Semifinals
A1	Armenia	2
B2	Botswana	1
A2	Benin	2
B1	Cameroon	1

Final
A1	Armenia	w/o
A2	Benin

5th to 8th place play-offs

7th-8th play-off
B4	Sudan	3
A4	Djibouti	0

5th-8th play-offs
A3	Uganda	3
B4	Sudan	0
A4	Djibouti	0
B3	Azerbaijan	3

5th-6th play-off
A3	Uganda	2
B3	Azerbaijan	1

=== Final standings ===
Rank	Team
1	Armenia
2	Benin
3	Botswana
4	Cameroon
5	Uganda
6	Azerbaijan
7	Sudan
8	Djibouti

- Armenia and Benin promoted to Group III in 1999.

== Round robin ==
=== Group A ===
==== Uganda vs. Armenia ====
Uganda
1
Lugogo Tennis Club, Kampala, Uganda
28 January 1998

Armenia
2

			1	2	3
1	(Uganda) (Armenia)	Charles Yokwe; Tsolak Gevorgyan	0; 6	0; 6
2	(Uganda) (Armenia)	John Oduke; Sargis Sargsian	2; 6	4; 6
3	(Uganda) (Armenia)	John Oduke / Renato Sebbi; Davit Babayan / Hayk Hakobyan	6; 1	6; 3

==== Benin vs. Djibouti ====
Benin
3
Lugogo Tennis Club, Kampala, Uganda
28 January 1998

Djibouti
0

			1	2	3
1	(Benin) (Djibouti)	Sourou Gandonou; Abdou-Rahman Aden	6; 1	6; 0
2	(Benin) (Djibouti)	Christophe Pognon; Omar-Awad Mohammed	6; 0	6; 0
3	(Benin) (Djibouti)	Jean-Marie da Silva / Alphonse Gandonou; Abdullah Aden / Kadar Mogueh	6; 0	6; 1

==== Uganda vs. Benin ====
Uganda
0
Lugogo Tennis Club, Kampala, Uganda
29 January 1998

Benin
2

			1	2	3
1	(Uganda) (Benin)	Renato Sebbi; Sourou Gandonou	1; 6	2; 6
2	(Uganda) (Benin)	John Oduke; Christophe Pognon	6; 4	2; 6	3; 6
3	(Uganda) (Benin)					not played

==== Armenia vs. Djibouti ====
Armenia
2
Lugogo Tennis Club, Kampala, Uganda
29 January 1998

Djibouti
0

			1	2	3
1	(Armenia) (Djibouti)	Tsolak Gevorgyan; Abdullah Aden	6; 0	6; 0
2	(Armenia) (Djibouti)	Sargis Sargsian; Abdou-Rahman Aden	6; 0	6; 0
3	(Armenia) (Djibouti)					not played

==== Uganda vs. Djibouti ====
Uganda
3
Lugogo Tennis Club, Kampala, Uganda
30 January 1998

Djibouti
0

			1	2	3
1	(Uganda) (Djibouti)	Robert Buyinza; Kadar Mogueh	6; 0	6; 2
2	(Uganda) (Djibouti)	John Oduke; Abdullah Aden	6; 0	6; 0
3	(Uganda) (Djibouti)	Renato Sebbi / Charles Yokwe; Abdou-Rahman Aden / Omar-Awad Mohammed	6; 0	6; 4

==== Armenia vs. Benin ====
Armenia
2
Lugogo Tennis Club, Kampala, Uganda
30 January 1998

Benin
1

			1	2	3
1	(Armenia) (Benin)	Tsolak Gevorgyan; Sourou Gandonou	5; 7	7^{7} 6^{4}	6; 2
2	(Armenia) (Benin)	Sargis Sargsian; Christophe Pognon	6; 0	6; 2
3	(Armenia) (Benin)	Davit Babayan / Hayk Hakobyan; Jean-Marie da Silva / Alphonse Gandonou	3; 6	4; 6

=== Group B ===
==== Azerbaijan vs. Botswana ====
Azerbaijan
0
Lugogo Tennis Club, Kampala, Uganda
28 January 1998

Botswana
3

			1	2	3
1	(Azerbaijan) (Botswana)	Dmitri Zarubin; Michael Judd	2; 6	3; 6
2	(Azerbaijan) (Botswana)	Igor Borisov; Petrus Molefe	2; 6	4; 6
3	(Azerbaijan) (Botswana)	Raouf Eybazov / Eldar Kafarov; Michael Judd / Thato Kgosimore	3; 6	2; 6

==== Cameroon vs. Sudan ====
Cameroon
3
Lugogo Tennis Club, Kampala, Uganda
28 January 1998

Sudan
0

			1	2	3
1	(Cameroon) (Sudan)	Michel Ekwe; Mandour Abdalla	7^{9} 6^{7}	6^{6} 7^{8}	12; 10
2	(Cameroon) (Sudan)	Abel-Lobe Tabi; Gaafar Noureldin El-Sadig	7; 5	6; 3
3	(Cameroon) (Sudan)	Maurice Fomete / Simplice Meng; Mogeeb Abdalla / Asim Omar El-Agraa	6; 4	6; 2

==== Azerbaijan vs. Cameroon ====
Azerbaijan
0
Lugogo Tennis Club, Kampala, Uganda
29 January 1998

Cameroon
2

			1	2	3
1	(Azerbaijan) (Cameroon)	Dmitri Zarubin; Michel Ekwe	5; 7	4; 6
2	(Azerbaijan) (Cameroon)	Igor Borisov; Abel-Lobe Tabi	4; 6	6; 3	3; 6
3	(Azerbaijan) (Cameroon)					not played

==== Botswana vs. Sudan ====
Botswana
2
Lugogo Tennis Club, Kampala, Uganda
29 January 1998

Sudan
0

			1	2	3
1	(Botswana) (Sudan)	Thato Kgosimore; Mandour Abdalla	4; 6	7^{7} 6^{5}	6; 2
2	(Botswana) (Sudan)	Petrus Molefe; Gaafar Noureldin El-Sadig	6; 0	6; 2
3	(Botswana) (Sudan)					not played

==== Azerbaijan vs. Sudan ====
Azerbaijan
2
Lugogo Tennis Club, Kampala, Uganda
30 January 1998

Sudan
1

			1	2	3
1	(Azerbaijan) (Sudan)	Raouf Eybazov; Asim Omar El-Agraa	6; 2	5; 7	6; 4
2	(Azerbaijan) (Sudan)	Dmitri Zarubin; Mandour Abdalla	3; 6	6^{2} 7^{7}
3	(Azerbaijan) (Sudan)	Igor Borisov / Raouf Eybazov; Mandour Abdalla / Mogeeb Abdalla	7^{8} 6^{6}	6; 2

==== Botswana vs. Cameroon ====
Botswana
1
Lugogo Tennis Club, Kampala, Uganda
30 January 1998

Cameroon
2

			1	2	3
1	(Botswana) (Cameroon)	Michael Judd; Michel Ekwe	5; 7	4; 6
2	(Botswana) (Cameroon)	Petrus Molefe; Abel-Lobe Tabi	7^{7} 6^{3}	3; 6	6; 2
3	(Botswana) (Cameroon)	Michael Judd / Thato Kgosimore; Michel Ekwe / Maurice Fomete	4; 6	4; 6

== 1st to 4th place play-offs ==
=== Semifinals ===
==== Armenia vs. Botswana ====
Armenia
2
Lugogo Tennis Club, Kampala, Uganda
31 January 1998

Botswana
1

			1	2	3
1	(Armenia) (Botswana)	Tsolak Gevorgyan; Michael Judd	6; 2	6; 2
2	(Armenia) (Botswana)	Sargis Sargsian; Petrus Molefe	6; 2	6; 3
3	(Armenia) (Botswana)	Davit Babayan / Hayk Hakobyan; Michael Judd / Thato Kgosimore	6; 4	5; 7	6; 8

==== Cameroon vs. Benin ====
Cameroon
1
Lugogo Tennis Club, Kampala, Uganda
31 January 1998

Benin
2

			1	2	3
1	(Cameroon) (Benin)	Simplice Meng; Sourou Gandonou	3; 6	0; 1		retired
2	(Cameroon) (Benin)	Michel Ekwe; Christophe Pognon	6^{7} 7^{9}	2; 6
3	(Cameroon) (Benin)	Maurice Fomete / Abel-Lobe Tabi; Alphonse Gandonou / Sourou Gandonou	1; 6	6; 2	6; 2

=== Final ===
==== Armenia vs. Benin ====
Armenia
w/o
Lugogo Tennis Club, Kampala, Uganda
1 February 1998

Benin

		1	2	3
1	(Armenia) (Benin)				not played
2	(Armenia) (Benin)				not played
3	(Armenia) (Benin)				not played

=== 3rd to 4th play-off ===
==== Botswana vs. Cameroon ====
Botswana
3
Lugogo Tennis Club, Kampala, Uganda
1 February 1998

Cameroon
0

			1	2	3
1	(Botswana) (Cameroon)	Thato Kgosimore; Michel Ekwe	6; 3	6; 3
2	(Botswana) (Cameroon)	Petrus Molefe; Maurice Fomete	6; 1	6; 4
3	(Botswana) (Cameroon)	Michael Judd / Thato Kgosimore; Maurice Fomete / Abel-Lobe Tabi	6; 3	6; 2

== 5th to 8th place play-offs ==
=== 5th to 8th play-offs ===
==== Uganda vs. Sudan ====
Uganda
3
Lugogo Tennis Club, Kampala, Uganda
31 January 1998

Sudan
0

			1	2	3
1	(Uganda) (Sudan)	Robert Buyinza; Asim Omar El-Agraa	6; 1	6; 4
2	(Uganda) (Sudan)	John Oduke; Gaafar Noureldin El-Sadig	6; 0	6; 0
3	(Uganda) (Sudan)	Robert Buyinza / Renato Sebbi; Mogeeb Abdalla / Gaafar Noureldin El-Sadig	7^{8} 6^{6}	5; 7	8; 6

==== Azerbaijan vs. Djibouti ====
Azerbaijan
3
Lugogo Tennis Club, Kampala, Uganda
31 January 1998

Djibouti
0

			1	2	3
1	(Azerbaijan) (Djibouti)	Eldar Kafarov; Kadar Mogueh	6; 4	6; 1
2	(Azerbaijan) (Djibouti)	Raouf Eybazov; Abdullah Aden	6; 1	6; 0
3	(Azerbaijan) (Djibouti)	Raouf Eybazov / Eldar Kafarov; Abdou-Rahman Aden / Kadar Mogueh	6; 1	6; 1

=== 5th to 6th play-off ===
==== Azerbaijan vs. Uganda ====
Azerbaijan
1
Lugogo Tennis Club, Kampala, Uganda
1 February 1998

Uganda
2

			1	2	3
1	(Azerbaijan) (Uganda)	Dmitri Zarubin; Robert Buyinza	6; 3	6; 2
2	(Azerbaijan) (Uganda)	Igor Borisov; John Oduke	5; 7	7; 5	4; 6
3	(Azerbaijan) (Uganda)	Raouf Eybazov / Dmitri Zarubin; John Oduke / Renato Sebbi	3; 6	4; 6

=== 7th to 8th play-off ===
==== Djibouti vs. Sudan ====
Djibouti
0
Lugogo Tennis Club, Kampala, Uganda
1 February 1998

Sudan
3

			1	2	3
1	(Djibouti) (Sudan)	Abdou-Rahman Aden; Mandour Abdalla	0; 6	0; 6
2	(Djibouti) (Sudan)	Omar-Awad Mohammed; Gaafar Noureldin El-Sadig	1; 6	0; 6
3	(Djibouti) (Sudan)	Abdullah Aden / Kadar Mogueh; Mogeeb Abdalla / Asim Omar El-Agraa	0; 6	0; 6
