= 1999 Davis Cup Europe/Africa Zone Group IV =

International tennis competition

The Europe/Africa Zone was one of the three zones of the regional Davis Cup competition in 1999.

In the Europe/Africa Zone there were four different tiers, called groups, in which teams competed against each other to advance to the upper tier. The top two teams in each Group IV sub-zone advanced to the Europe/Africa Zone Group III in 2000. All other teams remained in Group IV.

== Participating nations ==
- Azerbaijan
- Botswana
- Cyprus
- Ethiopia
- Iceland
- Madagascar
- Malta
- San Marino
- Sudan
- Uganda

=== Draw ===
- Venue: Accra Sports Stadium, Accra, Ghana
- Date: 18–22 May

Zone A

| | ISL | MLT | CYP | ETH | SUD | RR; W–L | Match; W–L | Set; W–L | Standings |
| Iceland | | 2–1 | 2–1 | 3–0 | 3–0 | 4–0 | 10–2 (83%) | 22–3 (88%) | 1 |
| Malta | 1–2 | | 2–1 | 3–0 | 3–0 | 3–1 | 9–3 (75%) | 17–9 (65%) | 2 |
| Cyprus | 1–2 | 1–2 | | 3–0 | 3–0 | 2–2 | 8–4 (67%) | 17–9 (65%) | 3 |
| Ethiopia | 0–3 | 0–3 | 0–3 | | 3–0 | 1–3 | 3–9 (25%) | 7–19 (27%) | 4 |
| Sudan | 0–3 | 0–3 | 0–3 | 0–3 | | 0–4 | 0–12 (0%) | 1–24 (4%) | 5 |

Zone B

| | MAD | BOT | AZE | SMR | UGA | RR; W–L | Match; W–L | Set; W–L | Standings |
| Madagascar | | 2–1 | 1–2 | 2–1 | 3–0 | 3–1 | 8–4 (67%) | 17–9 (65%) | 1 |
| Botswana | 1–2 | | 2–1 | 2–1 | 3–0 | 3–1 | 8–4 (67%) | 18–12 (60%) | 2 |
| Azerbaijan | 2–1 | 1–2 | | 2–1 | 2–1 | 3–1 | 7–5 (58%) | 15–12 (56%) | 3 |
| San Marino | 1–2 | 1–2 | 1–2 | | 2–1 | 1–3 | 5–7 (42%) | 14–17 (45%) | 4 |
| Uganda | 0–3 | 0–3 | 1–2 | 1–2 | | 0–4 | 2–10 (17%) | 7–21 (25%) | 5 |

- Iceland, Malta, Madagascar and Botswana promoted to Group III in 2000.

== Zone A ==
=== Malta vs. Iceland ===
Malta
1
Accra Sports Stadium, Accra, Ghana
18 May 1999

Iceland
2

| | | | 1 | 2 | 3 |
|---|---|---|---|---|---|
| 1 | (Malta) (Iceland) | Marco Cappello; Arnar Sigurðsson | 3; 6 | 2; 6 |
| 2 | (Malta) (Iceland) | Christopher Gatt; Rafn Kumar Bonifacius | 6; 4 | 3; 6 | 2; 6 |
| 3 | (Malta) (Iceland) | Gordon Asciak / Mark Schembri; Davíð Halldórsson / Arnar Sigurðsson | 6; 0 | 6; 4 |

=== Cyprus vs. Sudan ===
Cyprus
3
Accra Sports Stadium, Accra, Ghana
18 May 1999

Sudan
0

| | | | 1 | 2 | 3 |
|---|---|---|---|---|---|
| 1 | (Cyprus) (Sudan) | George Kalanov; Gaafar Noureldin El-Sadig | 6; 2 | 6; 4 |
| 2 | (Cyprus) (Sudan) | Demetrios Leontis; Mandour Abdalla | 6; 0 | 6; 4 |
| 3 | (Cyprus) (Sudan) | Demetrios Leontis / Dimitri Savvides; Asim Omar El-Agraa / Khalid Farid | 6; 0 | 6; 2 |

=== Cyprus vs. Ethiopia ===
Cyprus
3
Accra Sports Stadium, Accra, Ghana
19 May 1999

Ethiopia
0

| | | | 1 | 2 | 3 |
|---|---|---|---|---|---|
| 1 | (Cyprus) (Ethiopia) | Dimitri Savvides; Yohannes Setegnwandimu | 6; 4 | 6; 2 |
| 2 | (Cyprus) (Ethiopia) | Demetrios Leontis; Samuel Woldegebriel | 6; 1 | 6; 0 |
| 3 | (Cyprus) (Ethiopia) | Demetrios Leontis / Constantinos Talianos; Yohannes Setegnwandimu / Samuel Woldegebriel | 4; 6 | 7; 5 | 6; 3 |

=== Iceland vs. Sudan ===
Iceland
3
Accra Sports Stadium, Accra, Ghana
19 May 1999

Sudan
0

| | | | 1 | 2 | 3 |
|---|---|---|---|---|---|
| 1 | (Iceland) (Sudan) | Arnar Sigurðsson; Asim Omar El-Agraa | 6; 1 | 6; 1 |
| 2 | (Iceland) (Sudan) | Rafn Kumar Bonifacius; Gaafar Noureldin El-Sadig | 6; 1 | 6; 2 |
| 3 | (Iceland) (Sudan) | Davíð Halldórsson / Arnar Sigurðsson; Asim Omar El-Agraa / Khalid Farid | 6; 2 | 6; 0 |

=== Malta vs. Sudan ===
Malta
3
Accra Sports Stadium, Accra, Ghana
20 May 1999

Sudan
0

| | | | 1 | 2 | 3 |
|---|---|---|---|---|---|
| 1 | (Malta) (Sudan) | Mark Schembri; Asim Omar El-Agraa | 6; 1 | 6; 1 |
| 2 | (Malta) (Sudan) | Gordon Asciak; Gaafar Noureldin El-Sadig | 6; 0 | 6; 0 |
| 3 | (Malta) (Sudan) | Gordon Asciak / Mark Schembri; Asim Omar El-Agraa / Gaafar Noureldin El-Sadig | 6; 3 | 6; 3 |

=== Ethiopia vs. Iceland ===
Ethiopia
0
Accra Sports Stadium, Accra, Ghana
20 May 1999

Iceland
3

| | | | 1 | 2 | 3 |
|---|---|---|---|---|---|
| 1 | (Ethiopia) (Iceland) | Habtamu Gebrekidan; Arnar Sigurðsson | 0; 6 | 0; 6 |
| 2 | (Ethiopia) (Iceland) | Yohannes Setegnwandimu; Rafn Kumar Bonifacius | 4; 6 | 3; 6 |
| 3 | (Ethiopia) (Iceland) | Yohannes Setegnwandimu / Samuel Woldegebriel; Rafn Kumar Bonifacius / Arnar Sigurðsson | 2; 6 | 3; 6 |

=== Malta vs. Ethiopia ===
Malta
3
Accra Sports Stadium, Accra, Ghana
21 May 1999

Ethiopia
0

| | | | 1 | 2 | 3 |
|---|---|---|---|---|---|
| 1 | (Malta) (Ethiopia) | Mark Schembri; Yohannes Setegnwandimu | 6; 3 | 6; 2 |
| 2 | (Malta) (Ethiopia) | Marco Cappello; Samuel Woldegebriel | 6; 2 | 6; 1 |
| 3 | (Malta) (Ethiopia) | Gordon Asciak / Mark Schembri; Yohannes Setegnwandimu / Samuel Woldegebriel | 6; 3 | 6; 0 |

=== Cyprus vs. Iceland ===
Cyprus
1
Accra Sports Stadium, Accra, Ghana
21 May 1999

Iceland
2

| | | | 1 | 2 | 3 |
|---|---|---|---|---|---|
| 1 | (Cyprus) (Iceland) | George Kalanov; Arnar Sigurðsson | 2; 6 | 2; 6 |
| 2 | (Cyprus) (Iceland) | Demetrios Leontis; Rafn Kumar Bonifacius | 6; 2 | 6; 1 |
| 3 | (Cyprus) (Iceland) | Demetrios Leontis / Dimitri Savvides; Rafn Kumar Bonifacius / Arnar Sigurðsson | 3; 6 | 4; 6 |

=== Malta vs. Cyprus ===
Malta
2
Accra Sports Stadium, Accra, Ghana
22 May 1999

Cyprus
1

| | | | 1 | 2 | 3 |
|---|---|---|---|---|---|
| 1 | (Malta) (Cyprus) | Gordon Asciak; Dimitri Savvides | 6; 1 | 7; 5 |
| 2 | (Malta) (Cyprus) | Christopher Gatt; Demetrios Leontis | 2; 6 | 0; 6 |
| 3 | (Malta) (Cyprus) | Gordon Asciak / Mark Schembri; Demetrios Leontis / Dimitri Savvides | 7^{7} 6^{4} | 2; 6 | 6; 3 |

=== Ethiopia vs. Sudan ===
Ethiopia
3
Accra Sports Stadium, Accra, Ghana
22 May 1999

Sudan
0

| | | | 1 | 2 | 3 |
|---|---|---|---|---|---|
| 1 | (Ethiopia) (Sudan) | Yohannes Setegnwandimu; Asim Omar El-Agraa | 6; 4 | 3; 6 | 6; 3 |
| 2 | (Ethiopia) (Sudan) | Samuel Woldegebriel; Gaafar Noureldin El-Sadig | 6; 4 | 6; 2 |
| 3 | (Ethiopia) (Sudan) | Yohannes Setegnwandimu / Samuel Woldegebriel; Asim Omar El-Agraa / Gaafar Noureldin El-Sadig | 7; 5 | 6; 3 |

== Zone B ==
=== Azerbaijan vs. San Marino ===
Azerbaijan
2
Accra Sports Stadium, Accra, Ghana
18 May 1999

San Marino
1

| | | | 1 | 2 | 3 |
|---|---|---|---|---|---|
| 1 | (Azerbaijan) (San Marino) | Emin Ağayev; William Forcellini | 6; 1 | 6; 0 |
| 2 | (Azerbaijan) (San Marino) | Dmitri Zarubin; Domenico Vicini | 2; 6 | 0; 6 |
| 3 | (Azerbaijan) (San Marino) | Emin Ağayev / Igor Borisov; Gabriel Francini / Domenico Vicini | 5; 7 | 7^{7} 6^{1} | 6; 4 |

=== Madagascar vs. Uganda ===
Madagascar
3
Accra Sports Stadium, Accra, Ghana
18 May 1999

Uganda
0

| | | | 1 | 2 | 3 |
|---|---|---|---|---|---|
| 1 | (Madagascar) (Uganda) | Donne-Dubert Radison; Christopher Bagala | 6; 1 | 6; 3 |
| 2 | (Madagascar) (Uganda) | Thierry Rajaobelina; John Oduke | 6; 0 | 6; 0 |
| 3 | (Madagascar) (Uganda) | Yves Makisim / Thierry Rajaobelina; Bob Ndibwami / John Oduke | 6^{2} 7^{7} | 7; 5 | 6; 4 |

=== Azerbaijan vs. Uganda ===
Azerbaijan
2
Accra Sports Stadium, Accra, Ghana
19 May 1999

Uganda
1

| | | | 1 | 2 | 3 |
|---|---|---|---|---|---|
| 1 | (Azerbaijan) (Uganda) | Emin Ağayev; Bob Ndibwami | 6; 1 | 6; 2 |
| 2 | (Azerbaijan) (Uganda) | Dmitri Zarubin; John Oduke | 5; 7 | 4; 6 |
| 3 | (Azerbaijan) (Uganda) | Emin Ağayev / Igor Borisov; Bob Ndibwami / John Oduke | 7; 5 | 6; 4 |

=== Botswana vs. San Marino ===
Botswana
2
Accra Sports Stadium, Accra, Ghana
19 May 1999

San Marino
1

| | | | 1 | 2 | 3 |
|---|---|---|---|---|---|
| 1 | (Botswana) (San Marino) | Thato Kgosimore; Gabriel Francini | 4; 6 | 6; 3 | 6; 1 |
| 2 | (Botswana) (San Marino) | Petrus Molefe; Domenico Vicini | 1; 6 | 6; 2 | 3; 6 |
| 3 | (Botswana) (San Marino) | Michael Judd / Petrus Molefe; William Forcellini / Domenico Vicini | 3; 6 | 6; 1 | 6; 2 |

=== Azerbaijan vs. Madagascar ===
Azerbaijan
2
Accra Sports Stadium, Accra, Ghana
20 May 1999

Madagascar
1

| | | | 1 | 2 | 3 |
|---|---|---|---|---|---|
| 1 | (Azerbaijan) (Madagascar) | Emin Ağayev; Donne-Dubert Radison | 7; 5 | 6; 4 |
| 2 | (Azerbaijan) (Madagascar) | Dmitri Zarubin; Thierry Rajaobelina | 2; 6 | 1; 6 |
| 3 | (Azerbaijan) (Madagascar) | Emin Ağayev / Igor Borisov; Harivony Andrianafetra / Thierry Rajaobelina | 6; 4 | 6; 2 |

=== Botswana vs. Uganda ===
Botswana
3
Accra Sports Stadium, Accra, Ghana
20 May 1999

Uganda
0

| | | | 1 | 2 | 3 |
|---|---|---|---|---|---|
| 1 | (Botswana) (Uganda) | Thato Kgosimore; Bob Ndibwami | 3; 6 | 7; 5 | 6; 2 |
| 2 | (Botswana) (Uganda) | Petrus Molefe; Godfrey Uzunga | 6; 1 | 6; 1 |
| 3 | (Botswana) (Uganda) | Michael Judd / Petrus Molefe; Christopher Bagala / Bob Ndibwami | 6; 2 | 6; 2 |

=== Botswana vs. Madagascar ===
Botswana
1
Accra Sports Stadium, Accra, Ghana
21 May 1999

Madagascar
2

| | | | 1 | 2 | 3 |
|---|---|---|---|---|---|
| 1 | (Botswana) (Madagascar) | Thato Kgosimore; Donne-Dubert Radison | 3; 6 | 5; 7 |
| 2 | (Botswana) (Madagascar) | Petrus Molefe; Thierry Rajaobelina | 6^{5} 7^{7} | 2; 6 |
| 3 | (Botswana) (Madagascar) | Michael Judd / Petrus Molefe; Harivony Andrianafetra / Thierry Rajaobelina | 6; 4 | 6; 3 |

=== San Marino vs. Uganda ===
San Marino
2
Accra Sports Stadium, Accra, Ghana
21 May 1999

Uganda
1

| | | | 1 | 2 | 3 |
|---|---|---|---|---|---|
| 1 | (San Marino) (Uganda) | William Forcellini; Bob Ndibwami | 6; 2 | 2; 6 | 6; 3 |
| 2 | (San Marino) (Uganda) | Domenico Vicini; John Oduke | 7^{10} 6^{8} | 6; 4 |
| 3 | (San Marino) (Uganda) | William Forcellini / Domenico Vicini; Bob Ndibwami / John Oduke | 6; 1 | 3; 6 | 2; 6 |

=== Azerbaijan vs. Botswana ===
Azerbaijan
1
Accra Sports Stadium, Accra, Ghana
22 May 1999

Botswana
2

| | | | 1 | 2 | 3 |
|---|---|---|---|---|---|
| 1 | (Azerbaijan) (Botswana) | Emin Ağayev; Thato Kgosimore | 6; 4 | 2; 6 | 6; 2 |
| 2 | (Azerbaijan) (Botswana) | Dmitri Zarubin; Petrus Molefe | 3; 6 | 4; 6 |
| 3 | (Azerbaijan) (Botswana) | Emin Ağayev / Igor Borisov; Michael Judd / Petrus Molefe | 7^{7} 6^{5} | 5; 7 | 1; 6 |

=== Madagascar vs. San Marino ===
Madagascar
2
Accra Sports Stadium, Accra, Ghana
22 May 1999

San Marino
1

| | | | 1 | 2 | 3 |
|---|---|---|---|---|---|
| 1 | (Madagascar) (San Marino) | Donne-Dubert Radison; William Forcellini | 6; 4 | 6; 3 |
| 2 | (Madagascar) (San Marino) | Thierry Rajaobelina; Domenico Vicini | 1; 6 | 6; 1 | 3; 6 |
| 3 | (Madagascar) (San Marino) | Harivony Andrianafetra / Thierry Rajaobelina; William Forcellini / Gabriel Francini | 6; 4 | 6; 4 |
