= 2001 Davis Cup Europe/Africa Zone Group III – Zone A =

One of the three 2001 regional Davis Cup competition zones

The Europe/Africa Zone was one of the three zones of the regional Davis Cup competition in 2001.

In the Europe/Africa Zone there were four different tiers, called groups, in which teams competed against each other to advance to the upper tier. The top two teams in Group III advanced to the Europe/Africa Zone Group II in 2002, whereas the bottom two teams were relegated to the Europe/Africa Zone Group IV in 2002.

== Participating nations ==
- Botswana
- Georgia
- Ghana
- Iceland
- Kenya
- Latvia
- Lithuania
- Madagascar

=== Draw ===
- Venue: National Centre, Gaborone, Botswana
- Date: 16–20 May

Group A

	LAT	MAD	GEO	KEN	RR; W–L	Match; W–L	Set; W–L	Standings
Latvia		3–0	3–0	2–1	3–0	8–1 (89%)	26–5 (84%)	1
Madagascar	0–3		2–1	3–0	2–1	5–4 (56%)	17–14 (55%)	2
Georgia	0–3	1–2		3–0	1–2	4–5 (44%)	12–17 (41%)	3
Kenya	1–2	0–3	0–3		0–3	1–8 (11%)	5–24 (17%)	4

Group B

	GHA	LTU	ISL	BOT	RR; W–L	Match; W–L	Set; W–L	Standings
Ghana		2–1	2–1	2–1	3–0	6–3 (67%)	21–13 (62%)	1
Lithuania	1–2		3–0	2–1	2–1	6–3 (67%)	20–12 (63%)	2
Iceland	1–2	0–3		2–1	1–2	3–6 (33%)	13–21 (38%)	3
Botswana	1–2	1–2	1–2		0–3	3–6 (33%)	11–19 (37%)	4

1st to 4th place play-offs

3rd-4th Play-off
B2	Lithuania	2
A2	Madagascar	1

Semifinals
A1	Latvia	2
B2	Lithuania	1
A2	Madagascar	0
B1	Ghana	3

Final
A1	Latvia	3
B1	Ghana	0

5th to 8th place play-offs

7th-8th Play-off
A3	Georgia	3
A4	Kenya	0

5th-8th Play-offs
A3	Georgia	1
B4	Botswana	2
A4	Kenya	1
B3	Iceland	2

5th-6th Play-off
B4	Botswana	2
B3	Iceland	1

=== Final standings ===
Rank	Team
1	Latvia
2	Ghana
3	Lithuania
4	Madagascar
5	Botswana
6	Iceland
7	Georgia
8	Kenya

- Latvia and Ghana promoted to Group II in 2002.
- Georgia and Kenya relegated to Group IV in 2002.

== Round robin ==
=== Group A ===
==== Latvia vs. Madagascar ====
Latvia
3
National Centre, Gaborone, Botswana
16 May 2001

Madagascar
0

			1	2	3	4	5
1	(Latvia) (Madagascar)	Andris Fiļimonovs; Jean-Marc Randriamanalina	4; 0	4; 1	4; 1
2	(Latvia) (Madagascar)	Raimonds Sproga; Germain Rasolondrazana	4; 2	5^{7} 4^{4}	0; 4	2; 4	5; 3
3	(Latvia) (Madagascar)	Andris Fiļimonovs / Andis Juška; Julien Mouchon / Donne-Dubert Radison	4; 0	4; 0	4; 0

==== Kenya vs. Georgia ====
Kenya
0
National Centre, Gaborone, Botswana
16 May 2001

Georgia
3

			1	2	3	4	5
1	(Kenya) (Georgia (country))	Allan Cooper; Mikhail Chaduneli	3; 5	3; 5	3; 5
2	(Kenya) (Georgia (country))	Norbert Oduor; Irakli Ushangishvili	0; 4	0; 4	1; 4
3	(Kenya) (Georgia (country))	Allan Cooper / Barry Ndinya; Michael Chokheli / Irakli Ushangishvili	1; 4	4^{4} 5^{7}	3; 5

==== Latvia vs. Georgia ====
Latvia
3
National Centre, Gaborone, Botswana
17 May 2001

Georgia
0

			1	2	3	4	5
1	(Latvia) (Georgia (country))	Andris Fiļimonovs; Mikhail Chaduneli	4; 1	4; 1	4; 1
2	(Latvia) (Georgia (country))	Raimonds Sproga; Irakli Ushangishvili	4; 2	4; 1	4; 1
3	(Latvia) (Georgia (country))	Andris Fiļimonovs / Raimonds Sproga; Mikhail Chaduneli / Michael Chokheli	4; 1	4; 2	4; 0

==== Kenya vs. Madagascar ====
Kenya
0
National Centre, Gaborone, Botswana
17 May 2001

Madagascar
3

			1	2	3	4	5
1	(Kenya) (Madagascar)	Allan Cooper; Donne-Dubert Radison	1; 4	1; 4	2; 4
2	(Kenya) (Madagascar)	Norbert Oduor; Germain Rasolondrazana	0; 4	2; 4	4; 2	1; 4
3	(Kenya) (Madagascar)	Balaraman Arun / Allan Cooper; Donne-Dubert Radison / Jean-Marc Randriamanalina	5; 3	4^{2} 5^{7}	2; 2			retired

==== Latvia vs. Kenya ====
Latvia
2
National Centre, Gaborone, Botswana
18 May 2001

Kenya
1

			1	2	3	4	5
1	(Latvia) (Kenya)	Andis Juška; Barry Ndinya	4; 0	4; 2	5; 3
2	(Latvia) (Kenya)	Deniss Pavlovs; Allan Cooper	4; 2	4^{5} 5^{7}	5^{7} 4^{2}	3; 5	0; 4
3	(Latvia) (Kenya)	Andris Fiļimonovs / Raimonds Sproga; Barry Ndinya / Norbert Oduor	4; 1	5; 3	4; 0

==== Georgia vs. Madagascar ====
Georgia
1
National Centre, Gaborone, Botswana
18 May 2001

Madagascar
2

			1	2	3	4	5
1	(Georgia (country)) (Madagascar)	Mikhail Chaduneli; Donne-Dubert Radison	0; 4	2; 4	2; 4
2	(Georgia (country)) (Madagascar)	Irakli Ushangishvili; Germain Rasolondrazana	0; 4	5^{7} 4^{4}	2; 4	4; 0	4; 1
3	(Georgia (country)) (Madagascar)	Michael Chokheli / Irakli Ushangishvili; Jean-Marc Randriamanalina / Germain Rasolondrazana	0; 4	1; 4	4^{5} 5^{7}

=== Group B ===
==== Lithuania vs. Iceland ====
Lithuania
3
National Centre, Gaborone, Botswana
16 May 2001

Iceland
0

			1	2	3	4	5
1	(Lithuania) (Iceland)	Aistis Šlajus; Davíð Halldórsson	4; 1	4; 2	4; 2
2	(Lithuania) (Iceland)	Rolandas Muraška; Arnar Sigurðsson	4; 0	4; 0	4; 0
3	(Lithuania) (Iceland)	Rolandas Muraška / Arūnas Rozga; Davíð Halldórsson / Arnar Sigurðsson	1; 4	5; 3	2; 4	5^{7} 4^{5}	4; 2

==== Ghana vs. Botswana ====
Ghana
2
National Centre, Gaborone, Botswana
16 May 2001

Botswana
1

			1	2	3	4	5
1	(Ghana) (Botswana)	Henry Adjei-Darko; Thato Kgosimore	4; 1	4; 1	4; 2
2	(Ghana) (Botswana)	Gunther Darkey; Petrus Molefe	4; 1	4; 1	4; 1
3	(Ghana) (Botswana)	Samuel Fumi / Franklyn Ofori; Michael Judd / Thato Kgosimore	4^{5} 5^{7}	4; 2	2; 4	2; 4

==== Lithuania vs. Botswana ====
Lithuania
2
National Centre, Gaborone, Botswana
17 May 2001

Botswana
1

			1	2	3	4	5
1	(Lithuania) (Botswana)	Aistis Šlajus; Michael Judd	1; 4	4; 0	4; 0	4; 0
2	(Lithuania) (Botswana)	Rolandas Muraška; Petrus Molefe	4; 0	4; 1	4; 0
3	(Lithuania) (Botswana)	Gitanas Mažonas / Arūnas Rozga; Michael Judd / Petrus Molefe	1; 4	0; 4	2; 4

==== Ghana vs. Iceland ====
Ghana
2
National Centre, Gaborone, Botswana
17 May 2001

Iceland
1

			1	2	3	4	5
1	(Ghana) (Iceland)	Henry Adjei-Darko; Rafn Kumar Bonifacius	4; 2	4; 2	5; 3
2	(Ghana) (Iceland)	Gunther Darkey; Arnar Sigurðsson	3; 5	5; 3	1; 4	5; 3	2; 4
3	(Ghana) (Iceland)	Samuel Fumi / Franklyn Ofori; Davíð Halldórsson / Arnar Sigurðsson	3; 5	1; 4	4; 0	4; 2	4; 1

==== Lithuania vs. Ghana ====
Lithuania
1
National Centre, Gaborone, Botswana
18 May 2001

Ghana
2

			1	2	3	4	5
1	(Lithuania) (Ghana)	Aistis Šlajus; Henry Adjei-Darko	5^{7} 4^{5}	4; 2	2; 4	2; 4	3; 5
2	(Lithuania) (Ghana)	Rolandas Muraška; Gunther Darkey	4; 1	4; 1	4; 2
3	(Lithuania) (Ghana)	Rolandas Muraška / Arūnas Rozga; Samuel Fumi / Franklyn Ofori	2; 4	4^{4} 5^{7}	3; 5

==== Botswana vs. Iceland ====
Botswana
1
National Centre, Gaborone, Botswana
18 May 2001

Iceland
2

			1	2	3	4	5
1	(Botswana) (Iceland)	Thato Kgosimore; Rafn Kumar Bonifacius	4^{5} 5^{7}	4; 1	3; 5	4^{6} 5^{8}
2	(Botswana) (Iceland)	Petrus Molefe; Arnar Sigurðsson	3; 5	5^{13} 4^{11}	1; 4	1; 4
3	(Botswana) (Iceland)	Michael Judd / Thato Kgosimore; Davíð Halldórsson / Andri Jónsson	4; 1	4; 0				retired

== 1st to 4th place play-offs ==
=== Semifinals ===
==== Latvia vs. Lithuania ====
Latvia
2
National Centre, Gaborone, Botswana
19 May 2001

Lithuania
1

			1	2	3	4	5
1	(Latvia) (Lithuania)	Andris Fiļimonovs; Aistis Šlajus	4; 0	4; 1	5^{10} 4^{8}
2	(Latvia) (Lithuania)	Raimonds Sproga; Rolandas Muraška	5; 3	2; 4	1; 4	1; 4
3	(Latvia) (Lithuania)	Andris Fiļimonovs / Raimonds Sproga; Rolandas Muraška / Aistis Šlajus	5; 3	4; 2	4^{6} 5^{8}	4; 0

==== Ghana vs. Madagascar ====
Ghana
3
National Centre, Gaborone, Botswana
19 May 2001

Madagascar
0

			1	2	3	4	5
1	(Ghana) (Madagascar)	Henry Adjei-Darko; Donne-Dubert Radison	4; 1	4; 1	4; 1
2	(Ghana) (Madagascar)	Gunther Darkey; Germain Rasolondrazana	4; 2	4; 1	4; 0
3	(Ghana) (Madagascar)	Samuel Fumi / Franklyn Ofori; Julien Mouchon / Donne-Dubert Radison	4; 2	4; 2	4; 1

=== Final ===
==== Latvia vs. Ghana ====
Latvia
3
National Centre, Gaborone, Botswana
20 May 2001

Ghana
0

			1	2	3	4	5
1	(Latvia) (Ghana)	Andris Fiļimonovs; Henry Adjei-Darko	4; 1	4; 2	4; 1
2	(Latvia) (Ghana)	Raimonds Sproga; Gunther Darkey	4; 2	4; 2	2; 4	5^{7} 4^{2}
3	(Latvia) (Ghana)	Andris Fiļimonovs / Raimonds Sproga; Samuel Fumi / Franklyn Ofori	4; 2	5^{7} 4^{4}	5^{7} 4^{5}

=== 3rd to 4th play-off ===
==== Lithuania vs. Madagascar ====
Lithuania
2
National Centre, Gaborone, Botswana
20 May 2001

Madagascar
1

			1	2	3	4	5
1	(Lithuania) (Madagascar)	Aistis Šlajus; Donne-Dubert Radison	5^{14} 4^{12}	0; 4	4; 0	2; 1		retired
2	(Lithuania) (Madagascar)	Rolandas Muraška; Germain Rasolondrazana	4; 2	4; 2	4; 0
3	(Lithuania) (Madagascar)	Gitanas Mažonas / Aistis Šlajus; Jean-Marc Randriamanalina / Germain Rasolondrazana	4; 2	0; 4	0; 4	1; 4

== 5th to 8th place play-offs ==
=== 5th to 8th play-offs ===
==== Georgia vs. Botswana ====
Georgia
1
National Centre, Gaborone, Botswana
19 May 2001

Botswana
2

			1	2	3	4	5
1	(Georgia (country)) (Botswana)	Michael Chokheli; Thato Kgosimore	4; 2	4; 0	2; 4	2; 4	1; 4
2	(Georgia (country)) (Botswana)	Irakli Ushangishvili; Petrus Molefe	4; 0	5; 3	4; 1
3	(Georgia (country)) (Botswana)	Mikhail Chaduneli / Irakli Ushangishvili; Michael Judd / Petrus Molefe	4^{11} 5^{13}	0; 4	5; 3	3; 5

==== Iceland vs. Kenya ====
Iceland
2
National Centre, Gaborone, Botswana
19 May 2001

Kenya
1

			1	2	3	4	5
1	(Iceland) (Kenya)	Rafn Kumar Bonifacius; Allan Cooper	4; 0	2; 4	2; 4	0; 4
2	(Iceland) (Kenya)	Arnar Sigurðsson; Norbert Oduor	4; 0	4; 0	4; 1
3	(Iceland) (Kenya)	Rafn Kumar Bonifacius / Arnar Sigurðsson; Allan Cooper / Norbert Oduor	4; 0	4; 0	5; 3

=== 5th to 6th play-off ===
==== Botswana vs. Iceland ====
Botswana
2
National Centre, Gaborone, Botswana
20 May 2001

Iceland
1

			1	2	3	4	5
1	(Botswana) (Iceland)	Michael Judd; Davíð Halldórsson	4; 1	5; 3	1; 4	5; 3
2	(Botswana) (Iceland)	Petrus Molefe; Rafn Kumar Bonifacius	3; 5	2; 4	2; 4
3	(Botswana) (Iceland)	Michael Judd / Petrus Molefe; Davíð Halldórsson / Arnar Sigurðsson	4; 0	2; 4	5^{7} 4^{3}	4; 0

=== 7th to 8th play-off ===
==== Georgia vs. Kenya ====
Georgia
3
National Centre, Gaborone, Botswana
20 May 2001

Kenya
0

			1	2	3	4	5
1	(Georgia (country)) (Kenya)	Mikhail Chaduneli; Barry Ndinya	4; 1	4; 2	4; 2
2	(Georgia (country)) (Kenya)	Irakli Ushangishvili; Allan Cooper	4^{4} 5^{7}	4; 2	0; 4	4; 2	4; 2
3	(Georgia (country)) (Kenya)	Mikhail Chaduneli / Otar Enukidze; Allan Cooper / Barry Ndinya	4; 2	5; 3				retired
