= 1996 Davis Cup =

1996 edition of the Davis Cup

Details
- Duration: 9 February – 1 December 1996
- Edition: 85th
- Teams: 124

Champion
- Winning nation: France

The 1996 Davis Cup (also known as the 1996 Davis Cup by NEC for sponsorship purposes) was the 85th edition of the Davis Cup, the most important tournament between national teams in men's tennis. 124 teams entered the competition, 16 in the World Group, 26 in the Americas Zone, 29 in the Asia/Oceania Zone, and 53 in the Europe/Africa Zone. Antigua and Barbuda, Armenia, Azerbaijan, Bosnia and Herzegovina, Botswana, Iceland, Liechtenstein and Panama made their first appearances in the tournament.

France defeated Sweden in the final at the Massan Hall in Malmö.

== World Group ==
Participating teams
Austria	Belgium	Czech Republic	Denmark
France	Germany	Hungary	India
Italy	Mexico	Netherlands	Russia
South Africa	Sweden	Switzerland	United States

=== Draw ===
First round 9–11 February
Rome, Italy (clay)
Russia	2
Italy	3
Johannesburg, South Africa (indoor hard)
Austria	2
South Africa	3
Geneva, Switzerland (indoor clay)
Germany	5
Switzerland	0
Besançon, France (indoor hard)
France	5
Denmark	0
Jaipur, India (grass)
India	3
Netherlands	2
Katrineholm, Sweden (indoor carpet)
Belgium	1
Sweden	4
Plzeň, Czech Republic (indoor carpet)
Hungary	0
Czech Republic	5
Carlsbad, CA, United States (hard)
Mexico	0
United States	5

Quarterfinals; 5–7 April
Rome, Italy (clay)
Italy	4
South Africa	1
Limoges, France (indoor clay)
Germany	0
France	5
Calcutta, India (grass)
India	0
Sweden	5
Prague, Czech Republic (indoor carpet)
Czech Republic	3
United States	2

Semifinals; 20–22 September
Nantes, France (indoor carpet)
Italy	2
France	3
Prague, Czech Republic (indoor carpet)
Sweden	4
Czech Republic	1

Final; 29 November–1 December
Malmö, Sweden (indoor hard)
France	3
Sweden	2

=== Final ===
Sweden vs. France

Sweden
2
Massan Hall, Malmö
29 November – 1 December 1996
Hard (indoors)

France
3

			1	2	3	4	5
1	(Sweden) (France)	Stefan Edberg; Cédric Pioline	3; 6	4; 6	3; 6
2	(Sweden) (France)	Thomas Enqvist; Arnaud Boetsch	6; 4	6; 3	7^{7} 6^{2}
3	(Sweden) (France)	Jonas Björkman / Nicklas Kulti; Guy Forget / Guillaume Raoux	3; 6	6; 1	3; 6	3; 6
4	(Sweden) (France)	Thomas Enqvist; Cédric Pioline	3; 6	6^{8} 7^{10}	6; 4	6; 4	9; 7
5	(Sweden) (France)	Nicklas Kulti; Arnaud Boetsch	6^{2} 7^{7}	6; 2	6; 4	6^{5} 7^{7}	8; 10

== World Group qualifying round ==
Date: 20–22 September

The eight losing teams in the World Group first round ties and eight winners of the Zonal Group I final round ties competed in the World Group qualifying round for spots in the 1997 World Group.

Home team	Score	Visiting team	Location	Venue	Door	Surface
Mexico	3–2	Argentina	Mexico City	Club Alemán de México	Outdoor	Hard
Croatia	1–4	Australia	Split	Teniski klub Split	Outdoor	Clay
Brazil	4–1	Austria	São Paulo	Hotel Transamérica	Indoor	Carpet
Romania	3–2	Belgium	Bucharest	Arenele BNR	Outdoor	Clay
Spain	4–1	Denmark	Tarragona	Club de Tennis Tarragona	Outdoor	Clay
Russia	4–1	Hungary	Moscow	Olympic Stadium	Indoor	Carpet
Switzerland	5–0	Morocco	Olten	Olten Hallenstadion	Indoor	Carpet
Netherlands	4–1	New Zealand	Haarlem	Sportclub Haarlem	Outdoor	Hard

- Mexico, Netherlands, Russia and Switzerland remain in the World Group in 1997.
- Australia, Brazil, Romania and Spain are promoted to the World Group in 1997.
- Argentina, Croatia, Morocco and New Zealand remain in Zonal Group I in 1997.
- Austria, Belgium, Denmark and Hungary are relegated to Zonal Group I in 1997.

== Americas Zone ==
=== Group I ===
Second Round Play-offs
Santiago, Chile (clay)
Peru	0
Chile	5

First Round Play-offs
Edmonton, Canada (indoor carpet)
Chile	2
Canada	3

First Round
Nassau, Bahamas (hard)
Peru	2
Bahamas	3
Santiago, Chile (clay)
Brazil	3
Chile	2
Valencia, Venezuela (hard)
Canada	2
Venezuela	3

Second Round
Mar del Plata, Argentina (clay)
Argentina	4
Bahamas	1
Santos, Brazil (clay)
Brazil	4
Venezuela	1

- Peru was relegated to Group II in 1997.
- Argentina and Brazil advance to the World Group qualifying round.

=== Group II ===
Relegation Play-offs
Guatemala City, Guatemala (hard)
Guatemala	1
Puerto Rico	4
Asunción, Paraguay (clay)
Paraguay	5
Barbados	0

First Round
Montevideo, Uruguay (clay)
Uruguay	5
Guatemala	0
Bogotá, Colombia (clay)
Puerto Rico	0
Colombia	5
Havana, Cuba (hard)
Cuba	3
Paraguay	2
Guayaquil, Ecuador (clay)
Barbados	0
Ecuador	5

Second Round
Montevideo, Uruguay (clay)
Uruguay	3
Colombia	2
Havana, Cuba (hard)
Cuba	0
Ecuador	3

Third Round
Guayaquil, Ecuador (clay)
Uruguay	1
Ecuador	4

- Guatemala and Barbados relegated to Group III in 1997.
- Ecuador promoted to Group I in 1997.

=== Group III ===
- Venue: Maya Country Club, San Salvador, El Salvador
- Date: 6–10 March

Group A

	HAI	DOM	TRI	ATG	CRC	RR; W–L	Match; W–L	Set; W–L	Standings
Haiti		3–0	3–0	3–0	3–0	4–0	12–0 (100%)	24–1 (96%)	1
Dominican Republic	0–3		3–0	2–1	3–0	3–1	8–4 (67%)	17–9 (65%)	2
Trinidad and Tobago	0–3	0–3		2–1	2–1	2–2	4–8 (33%)	8–19 (30%)	3
Antigua and Barbuda	0–3	1–2	1–2		3–0	1–3	5–7 (42%)	11–16 (41%)	4
Costa Rica	0–3	0–3	1–2	0–3		0–4	1–11 (8%)	7–22 (24%)	5

Group B

	ESA	PAN	JAM	BOL	BER	ECA	RR; W–L	Match; W–L	Set; W–L	Standings
El Salvador		3–0	2–1	3–0	3–0	3–0	5–0	14–1 (93%)	28–3 (90%)	1
Panama	0–3		3–0	2–1	2–1	2–1	4–1	9–6 (60%)	21–14 (60%)	2
Jamaica	1–2	0–3		2–1	3–0	2–1	3–2	8–7 (53%)	17–17 (50%)	3
Bolivia	0–3	1–2	1–2		3–0	3–0	2–3	8–7 (53%)	18–15 (55%)	4
Bermuda	0–3	1–2	0–3	0–3		2–1	1–4	3–12 (20%)	8–27 (23%)	5
Eastern Caribbean	0–3	1–2	1–2	0–3	1–2		0–5	3–12 (20%)	9–25 (26%)	6

- Haiti and El Salvador promoted to Group II in 1997.
- Costa Rica, Bermuda and Eastern Caribbean assigned to Group IV in 1997.

== Asia/Oceania Zone ==
=== Group I ===
Second Round Play-offs
Taipei, Taiwan (hard)
Indonesia	3
Chinese Taipei	2

First Round Play-offs
Jakarta, Indonesia (clay)
China	5
Indonesia	0
Taichung, Taiwan (clay)
Philippines	3
Chinese Taipei	2

First Round
Christchurch, New Zealand (grass)
New Zealand	4
China	1
Jakarta, Indonesia (clay)
South Korea	4
Indonesia	1
Yokkaichi, Japan (indoor carpet)
Philippines	0
Japan	5
Melbourne, Australia (indoor hard)
Chinese Taipei	0
Australia	3

Second Round
Seoul, South Korea (clay)
New Zealand	3
South Korea	2
Osaka, Japan (hard)
Japan	0
Australia	5

- Chinese Taipei relegated to Group II in 1997.
- New Zealand and Australia advance to World Group qualifying round.

=== Group II ===
Relegation Play-offs
Tehran, Iran (clay)
Sri Lanka	1
Iran	4
Riyadh, Saudi Arabia (hard)
Saudi Arabia	3
Bahrain	2

First Round
Causeway Bay, Hong Kong (hard)
Hong Kong	5
Sri Lanka	0
Bangkok, Thailand (hard)
Thailand	4
Iran	1
Rawalpindi, Pakistan (clay)
Pakistan	5
Saudi Arabia	0
Manama, Bahrain (hard)
Bahrain	0
Uzbekistan	5

Second Round
Bangkok, Thailand (hard)
Hong Kong	0
Thailand	5
Peshawar, Pakistan (grass)
Pakistan	0
Uzbekistan	5

Third Round
Tashkent, Uzbekistan (clay)
Thailand	0
Uzbekistan	5

- Sri Lanka and Bahrain relegated to Group III in 1997.
- Uzbekistan promoted to Group I in 1997.

=== Group III ===
- Venue: Aviation Club Tennis Centre, Dubai, United Arab Emirates
- Date: 18–24 March

Group A

	SIN	MAS	POC	KAZ	SYR	OMA	RR; W–L	Match; W–L	Set; W–L	Standings
Singapore		3–0	2–1	2–1	2–1	2–1	5–0	11–4 (73%)	23–10 (70%)	1
Malaysia	0–3		2–1	2–1	1–2	2–1	3–2	7–8 (47%)	17–19 (47%)	2
Pacific Oceania	1–2	1–2		2–1	2–1	2–1	3–2	8–7 (53%)	19–16 (54%)	3
Kazakhstan	1–2	1–2	1–2		2–1	2–1	2–3	7–8 (47%)	18–20 (47%)	4
Syria	1–2	2–1	1–2	1–2		3–0	2–3	8–7 (53%)	20–17 (54%)	5
Oman	1–2	1–2	1–2	1–2	0–3		0–5	4–11 (27%)	9–24 (27%)	6

Group B

	LIB	KUW	BAN	QAT	JOR	BRU	UAE	RR; W–L	Match; W–L	Set; W–L	Standings
Lebanon		3–0	3–0	3–0	2–1	3–0	3–0	6–0	17–1 (94%)	34–1 (97%)	1
Kuwait	0–3		3–0	2–1	3–0	3–0	3–0	5–1	14–4 (78%)	28–6 (82%)	2
Bangladesh	0–3	0–3		2–1	3–0	3–0	3–0	4–2	11–7 (61%)	22–16 (58%)	3
Qatar	0–3	1–2	1–2		3–0	3–0	3–0	3–3	11–7 (61%)	22–15 (59%)	4
Jordan	1–2	0–3	0–3	0–3		3–0	3–0	2–4	7–11 (39%)	14–22 (39%)	5
Brunei	0–3	0–3	0–3	0–3	0–3		2–1	1–5	2–16 (11%)	4–33 (11%)	6
United Arab Emirates	0–3	0–3	0–3	0–3	0–3	1–2		0–6	1–17 (6%)	3–34 (8%)	7

- Singapore and Lebanon promoted to Group II in 1997.
- Syria, Oman, Jordan, Brunei and United Arab Emirates assigned to Group IV in 1997.

== Europe/Africa Zone ==
=== Group I ===
Second Round Play-offs
Harare, Zimbabwe (hard)
Zimbabwe	4
Finland	1
Kyiv, Ukraine (clay)
Ukraine	4
Norway	1

First Round Play-offs
bye
Zimbabwe
bye
Finland
Ukraine
bye
Norway
bye

First Round
Morocco
bye
bye
Zimbabwe
Romania
bye
bye
Finland
Ukraine
bye
bye
Croatia
Ramat HaSharon, Israel (hard)
Norway	2
Israel	3
bye
Spain

Second Round
Casablanca, Morocco (clay)
Morocco	4
Zimbabwe	1
Helsinki, Finland (indoor carpet)
Romania	3
Finland	2
Dubrovnik, Croatia (indoor carpet)
Ukraine	0
Croatia	5
Ramat HaSharon, Israel (hard)
Israel	1
Spain	4

- Finland and Norway relegated to Group II in 1997.
- Morocco, Romania, Croatia, and Spain advance to World Group qualifying round.

=== Group II ===
Relegation Play-offs
Novo Mesto, Slovenia (clay)
Slovenia	5
Malta	0
Skopje, Macedonia (clay)
Macedonia	2
Latvia	3
Nigeria	w/o
Luxembourg
Novi Sad, Yugoslavia (carpet)
Yugoslavia	5
Algeria	0

First Round
Newcastle upon Tyne, UK (ind. carpet)
Slovenia	1
Great Britain	4
Accra, Ghana (hard)
Ghana	5
Malta	0
Cairo, Egypt (clay)
Egypt	5
Macedonia	0
Jūrmala, Latvia (indoor hard)
Ivory Coast	3
Latvia	2
Warsaw, Poland (clay)
Poland	4
Nigeria	1
Esch-sur-Alzette, Lux. (indoor carpet)
Belarus	4
Luxembourg	1
Budva, Yugoslavia (clay)
Yugoslavia	1
Slovakia	4
Algiers, Algeria (clay)
Algeria	0
Portugal	5

Second Round
Accra, Ghana (hard)
Great Britain	5
Ghana	0
Cairo, Egypt (clay)
Egypt	3
Ivory Coast	2
Poznań, Poland (clay)
Poland	4
Belarus	1
Trnava, Slovakia (indoor carpet)
Slovakia	5
Portugal	0

Third Round
Wimbledon, United Kingdom (grass)
Great Britain	5
Egypt	0
Trnava, Slovakia (indoor carpet)
Poland	1
Slovakia	4

- Malta, Macedonia, Nigeria, and Algeria relegated to Group III in 1997.
- Great Britain and Slovakia promoted to Group I in 1997.

=== Group III – Zone A ===
- Venue: T.E.D. Club, Istanbul, Turkey
- Date: 20–26 May

Group A

	LTU	SEN	SMR	ETH	AZE	ISL	SUD	RR; W–L	Match; W–L	Set; W–L	Standings
Lithuania		3–0	3–0	3–0	3–0	3–0	3–0	6–0	18–0 (100%)	36–3 (92%)	1
Senegal	0–3		2–1	2–1	3–0	3–0	3–0	5–1	13–5 (72%)	28–13 (68%)	2
San Marino	0–3	1–2		3–0	3–0	3–0	3–0	4–2	13–5 (72%)	27–12 (69%)	3
Ethiopia	0–3	1–2	0–3		3–0	2–1	2–1	3–3	8–10 (44%)	18–23 (44%)	4
Azerbaijan	0–3	0–3	0–3	0–3		2–1	2–1	2–4	4–14 (22%)	12–30 (29%)	5
Iceland	0–3	0–3	0–3	1–2	1–2		3–0	1–5	5–13 (28%)	13–26 (33%)	6
Sudan	0–3	0–3	0–3	1–2	1–2	0–3		0–6	2–16 (11%)	6–33 (15%)	7

Group B

	GEO	TUR	ARM	BIH	LIE	TUN	BEN	RR; W–L	Match; W–L	Set; W–L	Standings
Georgia		2–1	2–1	2–1	2–1	2–1	3–0	6–0	13–5 (72%)	28–11 (72%)	1
Turkey	1–2		2–1	2–1	3–0	3–0	3–0	5–1	14–4 (78%)	28–9 (76%)	2
Armenia	1–2	1–2		2–1	3–0	3–0	2–1	4–2	12–6 (67%)	27–16 (63%)	3
Bosnia and Herzegovina	1–2	1–2	1–2		2–1	2–1	3–0	3–3	10–8 (56%)	22–20 (52%)	4
Liechtenstein	1–2	0–3	0–3	1–2		3–0	2–1	2–4	7–11 (39%)	16–24 (40%)	5
Tunisia	1–2	0–3	0–3	1–2	0–3		2–1	1–5	4–14 (22%)	13–30 (30%)	6
Benin	0–3	0–3	1–2	0–3	1–2	1–2		0–6	3–15 (17%)	7–31 (18%)	7

- Lithuania and Georgia promoted to Group II in 1997.
- Azerbaijan, Iceland, Sudan, Liechtenstein, Tunisia and Benin assigned to Group IV in 1997.

=== Group III – Zone B ===
- Venue: Nairobi Club Ground, Nairobi, Kenya
- Date: 8–14 January

Group A

	IRL	CMR	EST	MDA	CYP	ZAM	DJI	RR; W–L	Match; W–L	Set; W–L	Standings
Ireland		2–1	3–0	3–0	3–0	3–0	3–0	6–0	17–1 (94%)	32–4 (89%)	1
Cameroon	1–2		2–1	2–1	2–1	3–0	3–0	5–1	13–5 (72%)	26–12 (68%)	2
Estonia	0–3	1–2		2–1	3–0	3–0	3–0	4–2	12–6 (67%)	25–15 (63%)	3
Moldova	0–3	1–2	1–2		2–1	2–1	3–0	3–3	9–9 (50%)	21–19 (53%)	4
Cyprus	0–3	1–2	0–3	1–2		3–0	3–0	2–4	8–10 (44%)	19–18 (51%)	5
Zambia	0–3	0–3	0–3	1–2	0–3		3–0	1–5	4–14 (22%)	9–28 (24%)	6
Djibouti	0–3	0–3	0–3	0–3	0–3	0–3		0–6	0–18 (0%)	0–36 (0%)	7

Group B

	GRE	BUL	MON	KEN	BOT	TOG	CGO	RR; W–L	Match; W–L	Set; W–L	Standings
Greece		3–0	1–2	3–0	3–0	3–0	3–0	5–1	16–2 (89%)	33–7 (83%)	1
Bulgaria	0–3		3–0	3–0	3–0	3–0	3–0	5–1	15–3 (83%)	30–10 (75%)	2
Monaco	2–1	0–3		2–1	3–0	3–0	3–0	5–1	13–5 (72%)	27–14 (66%)	3
Kenya	0–3	0–3	1–2		3–0	3–0	3–0	3–3	10–8 (56%)	25–18 (58%)	4
Botswana	0–3	0–3	0–3	0–3		3–0	3–0	2–4	6–12 (33%)	14–25 (36%)	5
Togo	0–3	0–3	0–3	0–3	0–3		3–0	1–5	3–15 (17%)	10–29 (26%)	6
Congo	0–3	0–3	0–3	0–3	0–3	0–3		0–6	0–18 (0%)	0–36 (0%)	7

- Ireland and Greece promoted to Group II in 1997.
- Cyprus, Zambia, Djibouti, Botswana, Togo and Congo assigned to Group IV in 1997.
