= Danniel Ruyange =

Ugandan cricketer (born 1985)

Personal information
- Born: 11 September 1985 (age 41); Kampala, Uganda
- Batting: Right-handed

International information
- National side: Uganda
- Source: Cricinfo, 24 January 2015

Danniel Ruyange (born 11 September 1985) is a Ugandan cricketer. A right-handed batsman, he has played his List A cricket for the Uganda national cricket team.

== Background and education ==
Ruyange was affected by his right shoulder injury while representing Uganda in 2009 ICC World Cricket League Division three. He returned after one year and he was part of national coach Peter Kirsten's plan when Uganda was finalising the preparations for WC Lin Malaysia.

He represented Kampala international Cricket Club and Challengers in Uganda national competitions

He graduated with certificate in Cisco certified network(CCNA) at Makerere University in Kampala. He obtained level one certificates from International Tennis Federation(ITF), Uganda Tennis Association(UTA), Uganda Olympic Committee (UOC) and Modern Tennis Methodology (MTM).

== Career ==
He is the founder and chief coach of ROL Tennis Academy that was established in 2012.

He is the coordinator of women's singles and mixed club leagues. He was one of the team members to Malaysia.

== See also ==
- Irfan Afridi
- Hamza Almuzahim
- Davis Arinaitwe
- Zephania Arinaitwe
- Arthur Kyobe
