= Tanganyika cricket team in Kenya in 1951–52 =

Tanganyika national cricket team tour

The Tanganyika national cricket team toured Kenya in December 1951 and played one three-day match against the Kenyan team. It was the first ever match between the two teams. It was the first of a series of occasional matches against countries in east Africa which would eventually lead to a formal triangular tournament being introduced in 1967.

== Only match ==
1-3 December 1951
Scorecard

Kenya	v	Tanganyika
293/8d (114 overs); J. Caudle 86; M.H. Kassam 6/65 (38 overs)		107 (60.4 overs); J.I.M. Bell 22*; J.R. Jabbar 6/23 (18.4 overs)
		159 (83.3 overs) f/o Pyarali Mohamedali 36; D.G. Hunter 4/41 (26 overs)

Kenya won by an innings and 27 runs
Nairobi Club Ground, Nairobi

- Toss not known
