= Relja Dulić Fišer =

Serbian tennis player

- Country (sports): Serbia and Montenegro
- Born: 31 December 1975 (age 49); Subotica, SR Serbia, SFR Yugoslavia
- Height: 1.80 m (5 ft 11 in)
- Turned pro: 1994
- Retired: 2007
- Plays: Left-handed
- Prize money: $12,742

Singles
- Career record: 0–1
- Career titles: 0
- Highest ranking: No. 330 (18 June 2001)

Doubles
- Career record: 1–0
- Career titles: 0
- Highest ranking: No. 383 (16 April 2001)

Team competitions
- Davis Cup: 5–1 (Sin. 1–1, Dbs. 4–0)

Relja Dulić Fišer (Serbian Cyrillic: Реља Дулић Фишер; born 31 December 1975) is a Serbian former professional tennis player.

== Career ==
Dulić Fišer achieved a career-high singles ranking of No. 330 on 18 June 2001, and a career-high doubles ranking of No. 383 on 16 April 2001. He primarily competed on the ITF Futures and Satellite circuits. He notably struggled in ITF finals, at one point losing 12 consecutive finals. His best result on the ATP Challenger Tour was reaching the quarterfinals at the Brașov Challenger in 2001.

He won the national senior championship of the Federal Republic of Yugoslavia in 1997, 1998, and 2000, representing TK Spartak Subotica.

Dulić Fišer represented Yugoslavia in the Davis Cup in 2000 and 2001. Over five ties, he achieved a singles record of 1–1 and was undefeated in doubles, winning all four matches alongside Janko Tipsarević.

== See also ==
- List of Serbia Davis Cup team representatives
