= Roland Rino Büchel =

Swiss politician (born 1965)

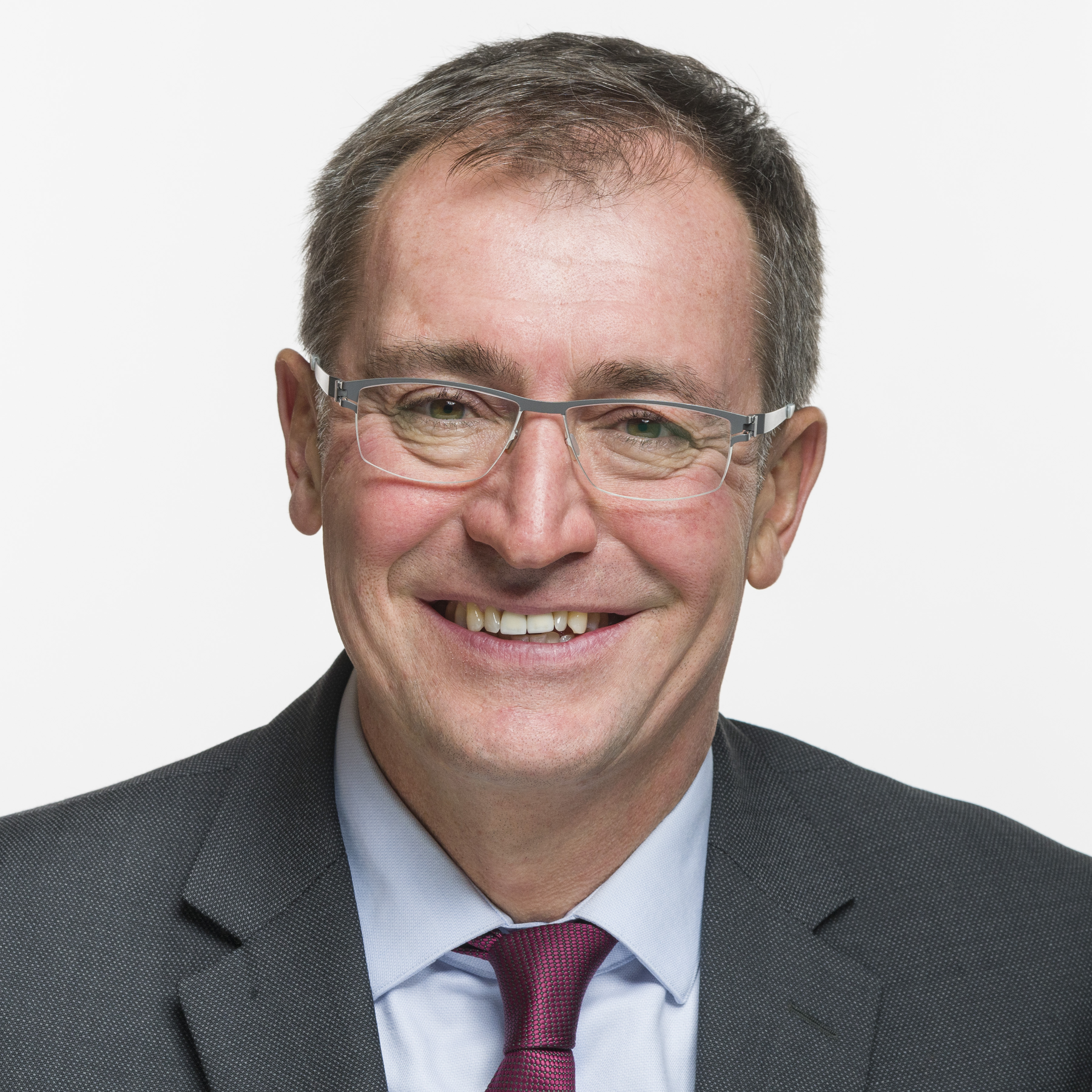
- Official portrait, 2019

Member of the National Council (Switzerland)
- Incumbent
- Assumed office 1 March 2010
- Preceded by: Jasmin Hutter
- Constituency: Canton of St. Gallen

Personal details
- Born: Roland Rino Büchel; 8 October 1965 (age 60) Altstätten, Switzerland
- Children: 1
- Occupation: Business executive, politician
- Website: Official website (in German)

Roland Rino Büchel (born 8 October 1965) is a Swiss business executive and politician. He currently serves as member of the National Council (Switzerland) for the Swiss People's Party (Switzerland's largest party) since 2010, as well as a Member of the Bureau of the Swiss National Council, and as a member of the Parliamentary Assembly of the Council of Europe.

== Career ==
=== Early years ===
In 1988–89, Büchel worked in a diplomatic internship at the Swiss embassies and consulates in Venice, Marseille, Milan, Buenos Aires, and Paris. In 1990 and from 1992 to 1999, he was the Head of Sponsorship at Swiss Cheese Union.

From 1999 to 2002, Büchel was Accounting Director for International Sport and Leisure and Marketing Director for FIFA. He became known thereafter as an internationally recognized FIFA critic and a campaigner against corruption in sports federations.

=== Politics ===
Büchel was elected to the Cantonal Council of St. Gallen in 2004, and he served on it until 2010. He was elected as replacement for Jasmin Hutter in the 2007 Swiss Federal election and was able to assume office on 1 March 2010. He was additionally the winner of the 2011 and 2015 parliamentary elections. In 2017, SonntagsZeitung ranked him as one of the top 10 SVP politicians. Büchel was a candidate for Council of States (Switzerland) in 2019, but he was not elected.

In June 2020, as Rapporteur of the Committee on Culture, Science, Education and Media of the Parliamentary Assembly of the Council of Europe, Büchel issued a report entitled "Time to act: Europe’s political response to fighting the manipulation of sports competitions." The MPs representing Council of Europe member states in the Assembly urged the European Union to quickly resolve what they called an “institutional deadlock” created by Malta over the definition of illegal sports betting, saying that Malta was preventing the European Union and its member states from ratifying a Council of Europe convention whose goal was to address the manipulation of sport, and unanimously approving a resolution based on a report by Büchel, given that the Assembly’s Standing Committee said it did not find any justification for Malta’s position.

In 2022 Büchel said, speaking of demonstrations, that in his view it was good that people on the street can make themselves felt, especially inasmuch as during the Coronavirus in Switzerland the right to protest had been suppressed too often by the government, but that he was against protesters damaging property.

In April 2024, he expressed a dim view of the European Court of Human Rights in Strasbourg, France, saying that he did not find the court to be credible.

In April 2025, after criticizing a scandal involving its members engaging in acts he termed shameful, he said: "Honest athletes and federations will have an easier time if (Swiss Olympic) abolishes the subsidy for fencers: funding crude activists is certainly not the responsibility of Swiss taxpayers."

Büchel has served as member of the National Council (Switzerland) for the Swiss People's Party (Switzerland's largest party) since 2010, as well as a Member of the Bureau of the Swiss National Council, and as a Member of the Parliamentary Assembly of the Council of Europe. Büchel has served on the National Council's Foreign Affairs Committee since 2010, and he was chair of it from 2015 to 2017.

==== Committees and subcommittees ====
- Foreign Affairs Committee (since 2010)
- Full Member: Committee on Culture, Science, Education and Media (since 25/01/2016)
- Full Member: Sub-Committee on Disability, Multiple and Intersectional Discrimination (since 23/01/2024)
- Full Member: Sub-Committee on Youth and the Society of the Future (since 23/01/2024)
- Full Member: Sub-Committee on Culture, Diversity and Heritage (from 23/01/2023 to 22/01/2023)
- Full Member: Sub-Committee on Education, Youth and Sport (from 29/01/2020 to 21/01/2024)
- Full Member: Sub-Committee on Integration (from 26/01/2016 to 28/01/2020)

== Personal ==
Büchel was born in Altstätten, a small rural town and a municipality in the district Rhine Valley, in the canton of St. Gall in Switzerland, and lives in Oberriet, a municipality in Rhine Valley in the canton of St. Gallen. He is fluent in English, Italian, French, and Spanish.

== See also ==
- List of members of the Swiss National Council
