= Uganda Tennis Association =

Sport governing body in Uganda

- Sport: Tennis
- Membership: Tennis clubs and traditional schools in Uganda
- Affiliation: International Tennis Federation
- Regional affiliation: Uganda
- Headquarters: Lugogo Tennis Complex, Rotary Avenue, Kampala, Uganda
- Chairman: Mathias Nalyanya
- Secretary: Alvin Mboigyana Bagaya

Official website
- www.tennisuganda.org
- (Uganda)

The Uganda Tennis Association (UTA) is the national governing body for tennis in Uganda. It is responsible for the development, promotion, regulation, and organization of tennis activities in the country.

== Functions and responsibilities ==
- Regulation and governance: UTA establishes and enforces rules for tennis in Uganda, aligning with international standards. It handles affiliation for clubs and institutions, ensuring they meet required facility and governance criteria.
- Competition organization: UTA organizes national and international tournaments hosted in Uganda, including the Uganda Open and the Kampala Premier Tennis League (KPTL).
- Grassroots & junior development: Through programs such as the Junior Tennis Initiative (JTI) and school-based outreach, UTA aims to grow tennis participation across all regions.
- Affiliations and membership: UTA’s membership includes clubs and schools that meet specified standards.
- Representation: UTA represents Uganda in the ITF.

== Key programs ==
- Junior Tennis Initiative (JTI): A nationwide development program targeting young players.
- Annual tournaments: Includes the flagship Uganda Open and junior circuit competitions.
- Clubs and schools engagement: UTA works with both established clubs and traditional schools.

== Notable achievements ==
- Ugandan players have earned medals in regional junior competitions, such as the 2023 ITF Confederation of African Tennis Zonals Championships in the U-14 and U-16 categories.
- Expansion of active member clubs and schools across Uganda, particularly outside Kampala.

== Structure and location ==
- Headquarters: Lugogo Tennis Complex, Rotary Avenue, Kampala.
- Affiliates: Clubs include; Lugogo Sports Club, Kampala Club Limited, Kabira Country Club, Mbale Sports Club, Makerere University Club, Jinja Tennis Club, Arua Tennis Club, Mbarara Sports Club, Entebbe Club, Soroti Sports Club.
- Schools: St. Mary’s College Kisubi, King’s College Budo, Ntare School, Gayaza High School, Nabisunsa Girls’ School, among others.

== See also ==
- Uganda Davis Cup team
- International Tennis Federation
