= Jean-Kome Loglo =

Togolese tennis player (born 1975)

- Country (sports): Togo
- Born: 24 June 1975 (age 49); Lomé, Togo
- Plays: Right-handed
- Prize money: $2,684

Singles
- Career record: 19–16 (at ATP Tour level, Grand Slam level, and in Davis Cup)
- Career titles: 0
- Highest ranking: No. 1111 (1 March 1999)

Doubles
- Career record: 10–12 (at ATP Tour level, Grand Slam level, and in Davis Cup)
- Career titles: 1 ITF
- Highest ranking: No. 908 (22 February 1999)
- Last updated on: 25 September 2017.

Jean-Kome Loglo (born 24 June 1975) is a Togolese tennis player.

Loglo has a career high ATP singles ranking of 1111 achieved on 1 March 1999. He also has a career high ATP doubles ranking of 908 achieved on 22 February 1999.

Loglo represented Togo at the Davis Cup, where he has a W/L record of 29–28.
