= Uganda Davis Cup team =

National sports team

The Uganda Davis Cup team represents Uganda in the Davis Cup tennis competition and is governed by the Uganda Tennis Association. Uganda currently competes in the Africa Zone of Group IV. Their best finish is fifth in Group IV in 1998.

== History ==
Uganda competed in its first Davis Cup in 1997, competing in the Europe/Africa Zone Group IV and achieving their best finish of fifth in Group IV in 1998, consistently playing in the lower tiers (Group IV/Africa Zone) to develop players like John Oduke (a record player) and Simon Ayella. After a 12-year hiatus, they returned in 2018, continuing to compete in Africa Zone events, aiming for promotion and player experience, though facing tough regional competition.

== Current team (2022) ==
- Godfrey Darious Ocen (Junior player)
- Edward Birungi
- Joel Mwisukye
- Wakoli Nasawali Ronald (Junior player)

== See also ==
- Davis Cup
- Uganda Billie Jean King Cup team
