= Madagascar Davis Cup team =

National tennis team

The Madagascar Davis Cup team represents Madagascar in Davis Cup tennis competition and are governed by the Fédération Malgache de Tennis. They have not competed since 2019.

They finished 4th in Group III in 2001 and 2002.

== History ==
Madagascar competed in its first Davis Cup in 1997.

== Last team (2019) ==
- Jean-Jacques Rakotohasy
- Antso Rakotondramanga (Captain-player)
- Lucas Andriamasilalao
- Toky Ranaivo

== See also ==
- Davis Cup
- Madagascar Billie Jean King Cup team
