= Nairobi Club Ground =

Sports venue in Nairobi, Kenya

Coordinates: 1°17′49″S 36°48′36″E

- Interactive map of Nairobi Club Ground

Ground information
- Location: Nairobi
- Country: Kenya
- End names
- Bowling Green End; Clubhouse End

International information
- Only men's ODI: 1 October 1996: South Africa v Sri Lanka
- As of 7 January 2021; Source: Cricinfo

The Nairobi Club Ground is a multi-use sports venue in Upper Hill, Nairobi, Kenya. It is the second oldest cricket ground in Kenya, having been predated by the Sir Ali Muslim Club Nairobi (named after the wealthy Arab benefactor, Sir Ali Bin Salim) which opened in 1934. The Nairobi Club lays claim to being the first cricket ground to feature a turf wicket when it opened in the early 1950s, which was installed by former club cricketer for Prestwich in the United Kingdom, and Nairobi Parks Department employee, Don Pringle who later represented East Africa in the 1975 Cricket World Cup.

== Cricket ==
The ground hosted its only One-Day International (ODI) in 1996, when South Africa played Sri Lanka in the Sameer Cup. Sri Lanka won the match by 2 wickets, with Sanath Jayasuriya passing 2,500 runs in ODI cricket and 100 wickets in List A cricket during the match. Other international matches have been played at the venue, with Kenya playing Tanzania in 1951 and 1952, and New Zealand in 1999. It also hosted eight matches in the 1994 ICC Trophy, none of which involved Kenya, the highlight perhaps being the match between Bermuda and the UAE which saw Bermuda score 329/9 only for the UAE to chase the target down and score 330/9 to win by one wicket with just two balls to spare. Both innings are in the all-time top 20 ICC Trophy team totals, and the UAE's total is their highest in the ICC Trophy. The cricket team of the Kenya Kongonis operates from the Nairobi Club

== Other sports ==
Many other sports are played at the ground, with the Kenya Davis Cup team playing their home matches here. There is also an all-weather hockey pitch and facilities for squash, bowls, and swimming.
