= Djibouti Davis Cup team =

The Djibouti Davis Cup team represents Djibouti in Davis Cup tennis competition.

== Governing body ==
They are governed by the Fédération Djiboutienne de Tennis.

== Last Competition ==
They have not competed since 2005.

== History ==
Djibouti competed in its first Davis Cup in 1993.

== Competition Performance ==
They have lost all 45 of their ties to date, and have yet to win a rubber.

== Last team (2005) ==
- Kadar Mogueh
- Fahir Osmar-Obsien
- Abdi-Fatah Abdourahman-Youssouf

== See also ==
- Davis Cup
