= Togo Davis Cup team =

The Togo Davis Cup team represents Togo in Davis Cup tennis competition and are governed by the Togo Tennis Federation.

They reached the Group II semifinals in 1992.

== History ==
Togo competed in its first Davis Cup in 1990.

Togo last played in Davis Cup in 2003.

== Current team (2022) ==
- Thomas Setodji
- Liova Ayite Ajavon
- Komlavi Loglo (Captain-player)
- M'lapa Tingou Akomlo
- Hod'abalo isak Padio (Junior player)

== See also ==
- Davis Cup
