= Michael Judd =

Permaculture designer and author

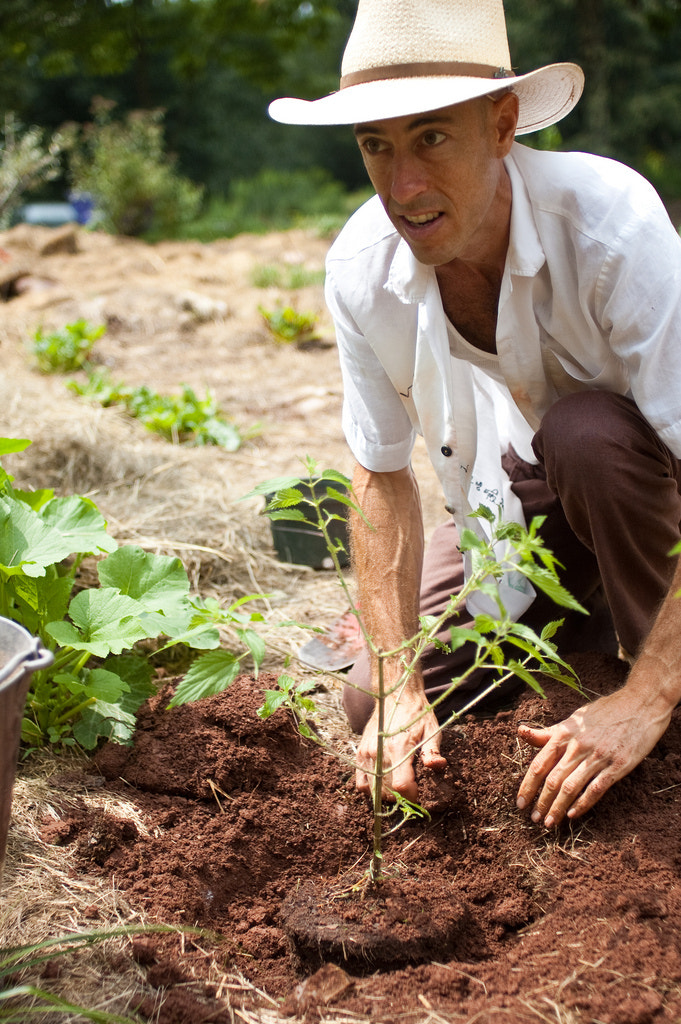
- Michael Judd At Sivananda Yoga Ranch
- Occupations: Permaculture designer Author; Educator
- Known for: Ecologia Design

Michael Judd is an American permaculture designer, author, educator and environmental advocate known for his work in ecological design and sustainable landscaping. He is the founder of Ecologia Design, a company dedicated to promoting environmentally responsible design solutions and fostering a deeper connection between people and the natural world through edible landscaping. Judd's work includes integrating edible landscapes, agroforestry and permaculture principles into practical designs for homeowners and communities. His work has been featured in The New York Times, The Guardian, BBC and The New Yorker.

== Career and Ecologia Design ==
Judd was born in the United States and grew up in western Maryland. He spent a decade running a grass roots non-profit in rural Latin America supporting agroecology research. Judd is the co-founder of SilvoCulture, a Maryland based non-profit focused on perennial food security, which is helping to plant a million nut trees in the Mid-Atlantic region. Judd is also the co-creator of the Fruit Patch App.

In 2010, Judd established Ecologia Design with the mission of integrating sustainable practices into everyday design. The company focuses on creating solutions that minimize environmental impact and enhance the harmony between human activities and nature. Ecologia Design was named as one of 15 Organizations Creating Edible Landscapes by Food Tank's Steve Edgerton and Danielle Nierenberg.

== Advocacy and contributions ==
In addition to his role at Ecologia Design, Judd is an active advocate for ecological sustainability. He participates in various forums, workshops and conferences to promote awareness about environmental issues and sustainable design practices. He is an ambassador for the pawpaw and for the revival of this forgotten fruit. He is an advocate for replacing ornamental lawns with edible landscapes to increase food security and resilience.

Judd and his family run an annual PawPaw Fest each September at their homestead in Frederick, Maryland. As of 2024, this family-friendly event had been running for 9 years and promotes education, sustainability and entertainment centered around the pawpaw fruit.

== Publications and media ==
Judd has written books such as Edible Landscaping with a Permaculture Twist and For the Love of Pawpaws: A Mini Manual for Growing and Caring for Pawpaws – From Seed to Table, which focus on creating resilient, productive landscapes that also support local ecosystems. He is involved in various educational initiatives, offering workshops and courses on topics like edible landscaping, mushroom cultivation, and creating food forests.

== Natural burial ==
Judd is the co-founder of Morris Orchard Natural Burial site, a green burial option in Maryland, USA. He was featured in a mini-documentary by Allen Clements and Make Films about his personal experience with green burial and his family's journey.

== Personal life ==
Judd is married and has two children. They live on his family homestead in Frederick, Maryland, Long Creek Permaculture Haven, in a circular strawbale home which was featured on the Natural Buildings YouTube channel in 2022.
