= Botswana Davis Cup team =

National tennis team

Botswana
- First year: 1996
- Years played: 18

The Botswana Davis Cup team represents Botswana in Davis Cup tennis competition and are governed by the Botswana Tennis Association. They have not competed since 2017.

The Botswana Davis Cup team has been a rapidly growing Davis Cup Team, and has been steadily been improving its World ranking. Botswana is currently ranked in the top 15 nations in African tennis.

== History ==
Botswana competed in its first Davis Cup in 1996.

== Current team (2022) ==
- Denzel Seetso (Junior player)
- Lefa Ashley Sibanda
- Thato Holmes
- Tshepo Mosarwa

== Team (2009) ==
- Shingirai Muzondiwa
- Thabiso Shatiso Mabaka
- Matshidiso Malope
- Lefa Ashley Mthandazo Sixtus Sibanda

== Team (2010) ==
- Shingirai Muzondiwa
- Thabiso Shatiso Mabaka
- Lefa Ashley Mthandazo Sixtus Sibanda
- Bakang Duke Mosinyi

== Team (2013) ==
- Phenyo Matong
- Shingirai Muzondiwa
- Innocent Tidimane (junior player)
- Aobakwe Lekang

== Team (2014) ==
- Phenyo Matong
- Shingirai Muzondiwa
- Thabiso Shatiso Mabaka
- Lame Botshoma

== See also ==
- Davis Cup
- Botswana Billie Jean King Cup team
- Botswana Tennis Association
