= 2001 Davis Cup Europe/Africa Zone Group IV – Zone B =

International tennis competition

The Europe/Africa Zone was one of the three zones of the regional Davis Cup competition in 2001.

In the Europe/Africa Zone there were four different tiers, called groups, in which teams competed against each other to advance to the upper tier. The top two teams in each Group IV sub-zone advanced to the Europe/Africa Zone Group III in 2002. All other teams remained in Group IV.

== Participating nations ==
- Andorra
- Angola
- Djibouti
- Ethiopia
- Libya
- Mali
- Malta
- Senegal
- Zambia

=== Draw ===
- Venue: Marsa Sports Club, Marsa, Malta
- Date: 9–13 May

Group A

| | AND | ANG | MLT | ETH | LBA | RR; W–L | Match; W–L | Set; W–L | Standings |
| Andorra | | 2–1 | 2–1 | 3–0 | 2–0 | 4–0 | 9–2 (82%) | 19–4 (83%) | 1 |
| Angola | 1–2 | | 2–0 | 2–0 | 3–0 | 3–1 | 8–2 (80%) | 16–6 (73%) | 2 |
| Malta | 1–2 | 0–2 | | 3–0 | 3–0 | 2–2 | 7–4 (64%) | 14–10 (58%) | 3 |
| Ethiopia | 0–3 | 0–2 | 0–3 | | 2–0 | 1–3 | 2–8 (20%) | 5–15 (25%) | 4 |
| Libya | 0–2 | 0–3 | 0–3 | 0–2 | | 0–4 | 0–10 (0%) | 1–20 (5%) | 5 |

Group B

| | ZAM | MLI | SEN | DJI | RR; W–L | Match; W–L | Set; W–L | Standings |
| Zambia | | 2–1 | 2–1 | 3–0 | 3–0 | 7–2 (78%) | 15–5 (75%) | 1 |
| Mali | 1–2 | | 3–0 | 3–0 | 2–1 | 7–2 (78%) | 15–4 (79%) | 2 |
| Senegal | 1–2 | 0–3 | | 3–0 | 1–2 | 4–5 (44%) | 8–11 (42%) | 3 |
| Djibouti | 0–3 | 0–3 | 0–3 | | 0–3 | 0–9 (0%) | 0–18 (0%) | 4 |

- Andorra and Zambia promoted to Group III in 2002.

== Group A ==
=== Malta vs. Libya ===
Malta
3
Marsa Sports Club, Marsa, Malta
9 May 2001

Libya
0

| | | | 1 | 2 | 3 |
|---|---|---|---|---|---|
| 1 | (Malta) (Libya) | Mark Schembri; Khaled Ezankouli | 7; 5 | 6; 4 |
| 2 | (Malta) (Libya) | Marco Cappello; Muayed Zankouli | 4; 6 | 6; 3 | 6; 1 |
| 3 | (Malta) (Libya) | Gordon Asciak / Matthew Debono; Abdul-Rahman Mohammed / Khaled Ezankouli | 7; 5 | 6; 2 |

=== Andorra vs. Ethiopia ===
Andorra
3
Marsa Sports Club, Marsa, Malta
9 May 2001

Ethiopia
0

| | | | 1 | 2 | 3 |
|---|---|---|---|---|---|
| 1 | (Andorra) (Ethiopia) | Jean-Baptiste Poux-Gautier; Yohannes Setegnwandimu | 6; 0 | 6; 1 |
| 2 | (Andorra) (Ethiopia) | Joan Jiménez Guerra; Samuel Woldegebriel | 6; 1 | 6; 0 |
| 3 | (Andorra) (Ethiopia) | Ernesto Díaz / Kenneth Tuilier-Curco; Mikaile Asfaw / Yohannes Setegnwandimu | 6; 1 | 6; 3 |

=== Malta vs. Angola ===
Malta
0
Marsa Sports Club, Marsa, Malta
10 May 2001

Angola
2

| | | | 1 | 2 | 3 |
|---|---|---|---|---|---|---|
| 1 | (Malta) (Angola) | Mark Schembri; Nélson Almeida | 5; 7 | 2; 6 |
| 2 | (Malta) (Angola) | Matthew Debono; João-Sebastião Miguel | 2; 6 | 6; 0 | 5; 7 |
| 3 | (Malta) (Angola) | Matthew Debono / Mark Schembri; Nélson Almeida / João-Sebastião Miguel | | | | not played |

=== Libya vs. Ethiopia ===
Libya
0
Marsa Sports Club, Marsa, Malta
10 May 2001

Ethiopia
2

| | | | 1 | 2 | 3 |
|---|---|---|---|---|---|---|
| 1 | (Libya) (Ethiopia) | Sanad Saleh Rashed; Yohannes Setegnwandimu | 3; 6 | 0; 6 |
| 2 | (Libya) (Ethiopia) | Muayed Zankouli; Samuel Woldegebriel | 2; 6 | 1; 6 |
| 3 | (Libya) (Ethiopia) | Sanad Saleh Rashed / Muayed Zankouli; Yohannes Setegnwandimu / Samuel Woldegebriel | | | | not played |

=== Andorra vs. Libya ===
Andorra
2
Marsa Sports Club, Marsa, Malta
11 May 2001

Libya
0

| | | | 1 | 2 | 3 |
|---|---|---|---|---|---|---|
| 1 | (Andorra) (Libya) | Joan Jiménez Guerra; Muayed Zankouli | 6; 2 | 6; 0 |
| 2 | (Andorra) (Libya) | Kenneth Tuilier-Curco; Khaled Ezankouli | 6; 1 | 6; 1 |
| 3 | (Andorra) (Libya) | Joan Jiménez Guerra / Kenneth Tuilier-Curco; Khaled Ezankouli / Muayed Zankouli | | | | not played |

=== Angola vs. Ethiopia ===
Angola
2
Marsa Sports Club, Marsa, Malta
11 May 2001

Ethiopia
0

| | | | 1 | 2 | 3 |
|---|---|---|---|---|---|---|
| 1 | (Angola) (Ethiopia) | João-Sebastião Miguel; Samuel Woldegebriel | 4; 6 | 6; 4 | 6; 2 |
| 2 | (Angola) (Ethiopia) | Nélson Almeida; Yohannes Setegnwandimu | 6; 0 | 6; 2 |
| 3 | (Angola) (Ethiopia) | Nélson Almeida / João-Sebastião Miguel; Yohannes Setegnwandimu / Samuel Woldegebriel | | | | not played |

=== Malta vs. Ethiopia ===
Malta
3
Marsa Sports Club, Marsa, Malta
12 May 2001

Ethiopia
0

| | | | 1 | 2 | 3 |
|---|---|---|---|---|---|---|
| 1 | (Malta) (Ethiopia) | Mark Schembri; Mikaile Asfaw | 6; 1 | 6; 3 |
| 2 | (Malta) (Ethiopia) | Matthew Debono; Samuel Woldegebriel | 6; 1 | | | retired |
| 3 | (Malta) (Ethiopia) | Gordon Asciak / Mark Schembri; Mikaile Asfaw / Yohannes Setegnwandimu | 6; 0 | 6; 3 |

=== Andorra vs. Angola ===
Andorra
2
Marsa Sports Club, Marsa, Malta
12 May 2001

Angola
1

| | | | 1 | 2 | 3 |
|---|---|---|---|---|---|
| 1 | (Andorra) (Angola) | Jean-Baptiste Poux-Gautier; Nélson Almeida | 6; 1 | 7; 5 |
| 2 | (Andorra) (Angola) | Joan Jiménez Guerra; João-Sebastião Miguel | 6; 1 | 6; 2 |
| 3 | (Andorra) (Angola) | Ernesto Díaz / Kenneth Tuilier-Curco; Nélson Almeida / João-Sebastião Miguel | 4; 6 | 1; 6 |

=== Malta vs. Andorra ===
Malta
1
Marsa Sports Club, Marsa, Malta
13 May 2001

Andorra
2

| | | | 1 | 2 | 3 |
|---|---|---|---|---|---|
| 1 | (Malta) (Andorra) | Mark Schembri; Kenneth Tuilier-Curco | 3; 6 | 1; 6 |
| 2 | (Malta) (Andorra) | Marco Cappello; Joan Jiménez Guerra | 1; 6 | 0; 6 |
| 3 | (Malta) (Andorra) | Gordon Asciak / Matthew Debono; Ernesto Díaz / Jean-Baptiste Poux-Gautier | 6; 4 | 1; 6 | 6; 4 |

=== Angola vs. Libya ===
Angola
3
Marsa Sports Club, Marsa, Malta
13 May 2001

Libya
0

| | | | 1 | 2 | 3 |
|---|---|---|---|---|---|
| 1 | (Angola) (Libya) | Nélson Almeida; Abdul-Rahman Mohammed | 6; 2 | 6; 2 |
| 2 | (Angola) (Libya) | João-Sebastião Miguel; Sanad Saleh Rashed | 7; 5 | 6; 3 |
| 3 | (Angola) (Libya) | Nélson Almeida / João-Sebastião Miguel; Sanad Saleh Rashed / Muayed Zankouli | 7; 5 | 6; 4 |

== Group B ==
=== Senegal vs. Mali ===
Senegal
0
Marsa Sports Club, Marsa, Malta
9 May 2001

Mali
3

| | | | 1 | 2 | 3 |
|---|---|---|---|---|---|
| 1 | (Senegal) (Mali) | Diadji Ka; Diabete Sekou | 6^{1} 7^{7} | 3; 6 |
| 2 | (Senegal) (Mali) | Wael Zeidan; Diaguely-Dittamba Samassa | 4; 6 | 4; 6 |
| 3 | (Senegal) (Mali) | Mansour Diedhiou / Wael Zeidan; Diaguely-Dittamba Samassa / Yaya Traoré | 4; 6 | 0; 6 |

=== Zambia vs. Djibouti ===
Zambia
3
Marsa Sports Club, Marsa, Malta
9 May 2001

Djibouti
0

| | | | 1 | 2 | 3 |
|---|---|---|---|---|---|
| 1 | (Zambia) (Djibouti) | Sidney Bwalya; Abdou-Rahman Aden | 6; 0 | 6; 0 |
| 2 | (Zambia) (Djibouti) | Lighton Ndefwai-Muchinda; Kadar Mogueh | 6; 0 | 6; 0 |
| 3 | (Zambia) (Djibouti) | Khambula Msiska / Kachinga Sinkala; Abdou-Rahman Aden / Mohammed-Ali Mehdial | 6; 2 | 6; 0 |

=== Senegal vs. Zambia ===
Senegal
1
Marsa Sports Club, Marsa, Malta
12 May 2001

Zambia
2

| | | | 1 | 2 | 3 |
|---|---|---|---|---|---|
| 1 | (Senegal) (Zambia) | Diadji Ka; Sidney Bwalya | 7; 5 | 3; 6 | 6; 3 |
| 2 | (Senegal) (Zambia) | Wael Zeidan; Lighton Ndefwai-Muchinda | 2; 6 | 1; 6 |
| 3 | (Senegal) (Zambia) | Mansour Diedhiou / Wael Zeidan; Khambula Msiska / Lighton Ndefwai-Muchinda | 3; 6 | 1; 6 |

=== Mali vs. Djibouti ===
Mali
3
Marsa Sports Club, Marsa, Malta
12 May 2001

Djibouti
0

| | | | 1 | 2 | 3 |
|---|---|---|---|---|---|
| 1 | (Mali) (Djibouti) | Bakary Kamissoko; Mohammed-Ali Mehdial | 6; 2 | 6; 0 |
| 2 | (Mali) (Djibouti) | Diaguely-Dittamba Samassa; Kadar Mogueh | 6; 0 | 6; 1 |
| 3 | (Mali) (Djibouti) | Bakary Kamissoko / Diaguely-Dittamba Samassa; Abdou-Rahman Aden / Kadar Mogueh | 6; 2 | 6; 2 |

=== Senegal vs. Djibouti ===
Senegal
3
Marsa Sports Club, Marsa, Malta
13 May 2001

Djibouti
0

| | | | 1 | 2 | 3 |
|---|---|---|---|---|---|
| 1 | (Senegal) (Djibouti) | Diadji Ka; Abdou-Rahman Aden | 6; 0 | 6; 0 |
| 2 | (Senegal) (Djibouti) | Wael Zeidan; Kadar Mogueh | 6; 0 | 6; 1 |
| 3 | (Senegal) (Djibouti) | Mansour Diedhiou / Wael Zeidan; Abdou-Ali Abdullah / Abdou-Rahman Aden | 6; 0 | 6; 0 |

=== Zambia vs. Mali ===
Zambia
2
Marsa Sports Club, Marsa, Malta
13 May 2001

Mali
1

| | | | 1 | 2 | 3 |
|---|---|---|---|---|---|---|
| 1 | (Zambia) (Mali) | Sidney Bwalya; Diabete Sekou | 6; 1 | 6; 1 |
| 2 | (Zambia) (Mali) | Lighton Ndefwai-Muchinda; Diaguely-Dittamba Samassa | 6; 3 | 3; 6 | 6; 8 |
| 3 | (Zambia) (Mali) | Khambula Msiska / Lighton Ndefwai-Muchinda; Diaguely-Dittamba Samassa / Diabete Sekou | 3; 6 | 6; 1 | 2; 3 | retired |
