= 2002 Davis Cup Europe/Africa Zone Group IV – Zone A =

International tennis competition

The Europe/Africa Zone was one of the three zones of the regional Davis Cup competition in 2002.

In the Europe/Africa Zone there were four different tiers, called groups, in which teams competed against each other to advance to the upper tier. Group IV was split into two tournaments. One tournament was held in Mombasa Sports Club, Mombasa, Kenya, February 6–10, on outdoor hard courts, while the other was held in Centro Tennis Parco di Montecchio, San Marino, June 12–16, on outdoor clay courts.

== Format ==
The seven teams in the Mombasa tournament were split into two groups and played in a round-robin format. The top two teams of each group advanced to the promotion pool, from which the two top teams were promoted to the Europe/Africa Zone Group III in 2003. The remaining teams in each group from the preliminary round were placed in a second pool to determine places 5–7.

== Pool A ==
	Pool A	KEN	RWA	DJI
1	Kenya (2–0)		3–0	3–0
2	Rwanda (1–1)	0–3		3–0
3	Djibouti (0–2)	0–3	0–3	

=== Kenya vs. Rwanda ===
Kenya
3
Mombasa Sports Club, Mombasa, Kenya
6 February 2002
Hard

Rwanda
0

			1	2	3
1	(Kenya) (Rwanda)	Norbert Oduor; Eric Hagenimana	6; 1	6; 2
2	(Kenya) (Rwanda)	Trevor Kiruki; Sylvain Rutikanga	6; 2	6; 4
3	(Kenya) (Rwanda)	Trevor Kiruki / Francis Thuku Mwangi; Eric Hagenimana / Alain Hakizimana	6; 4	6; 3

=== Djibouti vs. Rwanda ===
Djibouti
0
Mombasa Sports Club, Mombasa, Kenya
7 February 2002
Hard

Rwanda
3

			1	2	3
1	(Djibouti) (Rwanda)	Abdou-Rahman Aden; Jean-Claude Gasigwa	1; 6	1; 6
2	(Djibouti) (Rwanda)	Hamdi-Aden Moussa; Eric Hagenimana	1; 6	1; 6
3	(Djibouti) (Rwanda)	Abdou-Rahman Aden / Mahfoud Mouktar; Jean-Claude Gasigwa / Alain Hakizimana	3; 6	0; 6

=== Kenya vs. Djibouti ===
Kenya
3
Mombasa Sports Club, Mombasa, Kenya
8 February 2002
Hard

Djibouti
0

			1	2	3
1	(Kenya) (Djibouti)	Francis Thuku Mwangi; Mounawar-Bourhan Ali	6; 0	6; 1
2	(Kenya) (Djibouti)	Norbert Oduor; Hamdi-Aden Moussa	6; 0	6; 0
3	(Kenya) (Djibouti)	Trevor Kiruki / Francis Thuku Mwangi; Mounawar-Bourhan Ali / Hamdi-Aden Moussa	6; 0	6; 0

== Pool B ==
	Pool B	ALG	ANG	MLT	ETH
1	Algeria (3–0)		2–1	3–0	3–0
2	Angola (2–1)	1–2		3–0	3–0
3	Malta (1–2)	0–3	0–3		3–0
4	Ethiopia (0–3)	0–3	0–3	0–3	

=== Angola vs. Malta ===
Angola
3
Mombasa Sports Club, Mombasa, Kenya
6 February 2002
Hard

Malta
0

			1	2	3
1	(Angola) (Malta)	José Nenganga; Mark Schembri	4; 6	6; 3	8; 6
2	(Angola) (Malta)	Nélson Almeida; Maurizio Cappello	6; 4	6; 2
3	(Angola) (Malta)	João-Sebastião Miguel / José Nenganga; Maurizio Cappello / Marcus Delicata	6; 4	7^{7} 6^{3}

=== Algeria vs. Ethiopia ===
Algeria
3
Mombasa Sports Club, Mombasa, Kenya
6 February 2002
Hard

Ethiopia
0

			1	2	3
1	(Algeria) (Ethiopia)	Lamine Ouahab; Elias Mukember	6; 1	6; 0
2	(Algeria) (Ethiopia)	Abdelhak Hameurlaïne; Yohannes Setegnwandimu	6; 2	6; 0
3	(Algeria) (Ethiopia)	Sofiane Dob / Noureddine Mahmoudi; Mikaile Asfaw / Yohannes Setegnwandimu	5; 7	7; 5	6; 2

=== Angola vs. Ethiopia ===
Angola
3
Mombasa Sports Club, Mombasa, Kenya
7 February 2002
Hard

Ethiopia
0

			1	2	3
1	(Angola) (Ethiopia)	José Nenganga; Mikaile Asfaw	6; 4	7; 5
2	(Angola) (Ethiopia)	Nélson Almeida; Yohannes Setegnwandimu	6; 4	6; 1
3	(Angola) (Ethiopia)	João-Sebastião Miguel / José Nenganga; Habtamu Gebrekidan / Elias Mukember	6; 4	6; 1

=== Algeria vs. Malta ===
Algeria
3
Mombasa Sports Club, Mombasa, Kenya
7 February 2002
Hard

Malta
0

			1	2	3
1	(Algeria) (Malta)	Lamine Ouahab; Mark Schembri	6; 2	6; 0
2	(Algeria) (Malta)	Noureddine Mahmoudi; Marcus Delicata	6; 2	6; 0
3	(Algeria) (Malta)	Sofiane Dob / Abdelhak Hameurlaïne; Maurizio Cappello / Mark Schembri	6; 2	6; 1

=== Angola vs. Algeria ===
Angola
1
Mombasa Sports Club, Mombasa, Kenya
8 February 2002
Hard

Algeria
2

			1	2	3
1	(Angola) (Algeria)	José Nenganga; Lamine Ouahab	0; 6	3; 6
2	(Angola) (Algeria)	Nélson Almeida; Abdelhak Hameurlaïne	6; 4	1; 6	6; 2
3	(Angola) (Algeria)	Nélson Almeida / João-Sebastião Miguel; Noureddine Mahmoudi / Lamine Ouahab	0; 6	2; 6

=== Malta vs. Ethiopia ===
Malta
3
Mombasa Sports Club, Mombasa, Kenya
8 February 2002
Hard

Ethiopia
0

			1	2	3
1	(Malta) (Ethiopia)	Mark Schembri; Mikaile Asfaw	6; 4	6; 3
2	(Malta) (Ethiopia)	Marcus Delicata; Yohannes Setegnwandimu	4; 6	6; 3	8; 6
3	(Malta) (Ethiopia)	Marcus Delicata / Mark Schembri; Mikaile Asfaw / Elias Mukember	6; 3	5; 7	6; 2

== Promotion pool ==
The top two teams from each of Pools A and B advanced to the Promotion pool. Results and points from games against the opponent from the preliminary round were carried forward.

(scores in italics carried over from Groups)

	1st–4th Play-off	ALG	ANG	KEN	RWA
1	Algeria (3–0)		2–1	3–0	3–0
2	Angola (2–1)	1–2		2–1	3–0
3	Kenya (1–2)	0–3	1–2		3–0
4	Rwanda (0–3)	0–3	0–3	0–3	

Algeria and Angola promoted to Group III for 2003.

=== Kenya vs. Angola ===
Kenya
1
Mombasa Sports Club, Mombasa, Kenya
9 February 2002
Hard

Angola
2

			1	2	3
1	(Kenya) (Angola)	Trevor Kiruki; José Nenganga	1; 6	4; 6
2	(Kenya) (Angola)	Allan Cooper; Nélson Almeida	6; 3	3; 6	6; 8
3	(Kenya) (Angola)	Trevor Kiruki / Norbert Oduor; João-Sebastião Miguel / José Nenganga	3; 6	6; 3	6; 4

=== Rwanda vs. Algeria ===
Rwanda
0
Mombasa Sports Club, Mombasa, Kenya
9 February 2002
Hard

Algeria
3

			1	2	3
1	(Rwanda) (Algeria)	Eric Hagenimana; Lamine Ouahab	2; 6	2; 6
2	(Rwanda) (Algeria)	Sylvain Rutikanga; Noureddine Mahmoudi	1; 6	2; 6
3	(Rwanda) (Algeria)	Jean-Claude Gasigwa / Alain Hakizimana; Sofiane Dob / Noureddine Mahmoudi	2; 6	6; 4	4; 6

=== Kenya vs. Algeria ===
Kenya
0
Mombasa Sports Club, Mombasa, Kenya
10 February 2002
Hard

Algeria
3

			1	2	3
1	(Kenya) (Algeria)	Trevor Kiruki; Lamine Ouahab	4; 6	4; 6
2	(Kenya) (Algeria)	Allan Cooper; Abdelhak Hameurlaïne	6; 4	6^{5} 7^{7}	0; 6
3	(Kenya) (Algeria)	Trevor Kiruki / Francis Thuku Mwangi; Abdelhak Hameurlaïne / Lamine Ouahab	3; 6	2; 6

=== Rwanda vs. Angola ===
Rwanda
0
Mombasa Sports Club, Mombasa, Kenya
10 February 2002
Hard

Angola
3

			1	2	3
1	(Rwanda) (Angola)	Jean-Claude Gasigwa; José Nenganga	7; 5	0; 6	1; 6
2	(Rwanda) (Angola)	Eric Hagenimana; Nélson Almeida	4; 6	5; 7
3	(Rwanda) (Angola)	Alain Hakizimana / Sylvain Rutikanga; Nélson Almeida / João-Sebastião Miguel	4; 6	1; 6

== Placement pool ==
The bottom team from Pool A and the bottom two teams from Pool B were placed in the placement pool to determine places 5–7. Results and points from games against the opponent from the preliminary round were carried forward.

(scores in italics carried over from Groups)

	5th–7th Play-off	MLT	ETH	DJI
1	Malta (2–0)		3–0	3–0
2	Ethiopia (1–1)	0–3		3–0
3	Djibouti (0–2)	0–3	0–3	

=== Malta vs. Djibouti ===
Malta
3
Mombasa Sports Club, Mombasa, Kenya
9 February 2002
Hard

Djibouti
0

			1	2	3
1	(Malta) (Djibouti)	Mark Schembri; Mounawar-Bourhan Ali	6; 0	6; 0
2	(Malta) (Djibouti)	Marcus Delicata; Mahfoud Mouktar	6; 1	6; 0
3	(Malta) (Djibouti)	Marcus Delicata / Mark Schembri; Abdou-Rahman Aden / Mahfoud Mouktar	6; 0	6; 0

=== Ethiopia vs. Djibouti ===
Ethiopia
3
Mombasa Sports Club, Mombasa, Kenya
10 February 2002
Hard

Djibouti
0

			1	2	3
1	(Ethiopia) (Djibouti)	Habtamu Gebrekidan; Mahfoud Mouktar	6; 0	6; 2
2	(Ethiopia) (Djibouti)	Elias Mukember; Hamdi-Aden Moussa	6; 0	6; 1
3	(Ethiopia) (Djibouti)	Mikaile Asfaw / Yohannes Setegnwandimu; Abdou-Rahman Aden / Mahfoud Mouktar	6; 1	6; 0

== Final standings ==
Rank	Team
1	Algeria
2	Angola
3	Kenya
4	Rwanda
5	Malta
6	Ethiopia
7	Djibouti

- Algeria and Angola promoted to Group III in 2003.
