= 2003 Davis Cup =

International men's tennis tournament

Details
- Duration: 7 February – 30 November 2003
- Edition: 92nd
- Teams: 135

Champion
- Winning nation: Australia

The 2003 Davis Cup was the 92nd edition of the most important tournament between nations in men's tennis. A total of 135 nations participated in the tournament. In the final, Australia defeated Spain at Rod Laver Arena in Melbourne, Australia, on 28–30 November, giving Australia their 28th title.

== World Group ==
Participating Teams
Argentina	Australia	Belgium	Brazil
Croatia	Czech Republic	France	Germany
Great Britain	Netherlands	Romania	Russia
Spain	Sweden	Switzerland	United States

=== Draw ===
First round 7–9 February
Bucharest, Romania (indoor carpet)
S	France	4
Romania	1
Arnhem, Netherlands (indoor carpet)
S	Netherlands	2
Switzerland	3
Sydney, Australia (clay)
S	Australia	4
Great Britain	1
Helsingborg, Sweden (indoor carpet)
S	Sweden	3
Brazil	2
Zagreb, Croatia (indoor carpet)
Croatia	4
S	United States	1
Seville, Spain (clay)
Belgium	0
S	Spain	5
Buenos Aires, Argentina (clay)
Germany	0
S	Argentina	5
Ostrava, Czech Republic (indoor clay)
Czech Republic	2
S	Russia	3

Quarterfinals; 4–6 April
Toulouse, France (indoor hard)
S	France	2
Switzerland	3
Malmö, Sweden (indoor hard)
S	Australia	5
S	Sweden	0
Valencia, Spain (clay)
Croatia	0
S	Spain	5
Buenos Aires, Argentina (clay)
S	Argentina	5
S	Russia	0

Semifinals; 19–21 September
Melbourne, Australia (hard)
Switzerland	2
S	Australia	3
Málaga, Spain (clay)
S	Spain	3
S	Argentina	2

Final; 28–30 November
Melbourne, Australia (grass)
S	Australia	3
S	Spain	1

First round losers compete in play-off ties with Zonal Group I Qualifiers.

=== Final ===
Australia
3
Rod Laver Arena, Melbourne, Australia
28–30 November 2003
Grass

Spain
1

			1	2	3	4	5
1	(Australia) (Spain)	Lleyton Hewitt; Juan Carlos Ferrero	3; 6	6; 3	3; 6	7^{7} 6^{0}	6; 2
2	(Australia) (Spain)	Mark Philippoussis; Carlos Moyà	4; 6	4; 6	6; 4	6^{4} 7^{7}
3	(Australia) (Spain)	Wayne Arthurs / Todd Woodbridge; Àlex Corretja / Feliciano López	6; 3	6; 1	6; 3
4	(Australia) (Spain)	Mark Philippoussis; Juan Carlos Ferrero	7; 5	6; 3	1; 6	2; 6	6; 0
5	(Australia) (Spain)	Lleyton Hewitt; Carlos Moyà						not played

== World Group play-offs ==
Date: 19–21 September

Home team	Score	Visiting team	Location	Venue	Door	Surface
Austria	3–2	Belgium	Pörtschach	Werzer Arena Pörtschach	Outdoor	Clay
Canada	3–2	Brazil	Calgary	Stampede Corral	Indoor	Carpet
Thailand	1–4	Czech Republic	Bangkok	Impact, Muang Thong Thani	Indoor	Hard
Germany	2–3	Belarus	Sundern	TC Blau-Weiss Sundern	Outdoor	Clay
Morocco	3–2	Great Britain	Casablanca	Complex Sportif Al Amal	Outdoor	Clay
Netherlands	5–0	India	Zwolle	IJsselhallen	Indoor	Hard
Ecuador	2–3	Romania	Quito	Quito Tenis Y Golf Club	Outdoor	Clay
Slovakia	2–3	United States	Bratislava	National Tennis Centre	Outdoor	Clay

- Czech Republic, Netherlands, Romania and United States will remain in the World Group in 2004.
- Austria, Belarus, Canada and Morocco are promoted to the World Group in 2004.
- Ecuador, India, Slovakia and Thailand will remain in Zonal Group I in 2004.
- Belgium, Brazil, Germany and Great Britain are relegated to Zonal Group I in 2004.

== Americas Zone ==
=== Group I ===
Second Round Play-offs
Maracaibo, Venezuela (hard)
Venezuela	4
Bahamas	0

First Round Play-offs
Caracas, Venezuela (hard)
Venezuela	2
Chile	3
bye
Bahamas

First Round
S	Venezuela
bye
Quito, Ecuador (clay)
Chile	2
Ecuador	3
Lima, Peru (clay)
Bahamas	0
Peru	5
bye
S	Canada

Second Round
Salinas, Ecuador (clay)
S	Venezuela	2
Ecuador	3
Calgary, Canada (indoor carpet)
Peru	0
S	Canada	5

- Bahamas relegated to Group II in 2004.
- Ecuador and Canada advance to World Group Play-off.

=== Group II ===
Play-offs
Willemstad, Curaçao (hard)
Netherlands Antilles	2
Haiti	3
Montevideo, Uruguay (clay)
3	Colombia	2
2	Uruguay	3

First Round
Aguascalientes, Mexico (indoor carpet)
1	Mexico	5
Netherlands Antilles	0
Asunción, Paraguay (clay)
4	Paraguay	5
Haiti	0
Havana, Cuba (hard)
Cuba	5
3	Colombia	0
Maldonado, Uruguay (clay)
Dominican Republic	4
2	Uruguay	1

Second Round
Asunción, Paraguay (clay)
1	Mexico	1
4	Paraguay	4
Santo Domingo, Dominican Rep. (clay)
Cuba	1
Dominican Republic	4

Third Round
Santo Domingo, Dominican Rep. (hard)
4	Paraguay	4
Dominican Republic	1

- Netherlands Antilles and Colombia relegated to Group III in 2004.
- Paraguay promoted to Group I in 2004.

=== Group III ===
- Venue: Jean Pierre Complex, Port of Spain, Trinidad and Tobago (outdoor hard)
- Date: 31 March–4 April

Rank	Team
1	Jamaica
2	Puerto Rico
3	El Salvador
4	Bolivia
5	Honduras
6	Trinidad and Tobago
7	Guatemala
8	Saint Lucia

- Jamaica and Puerto Rico promoted to Group II in 2004.
- Guatemala and Saint Lucia relegated to Group IV in 2004.

=== Group IV ===
- Venue: Cariari Country Club, Cariari, Costa Rica (outdoor hard)
- Date: 31 March–5 April

Team	Pld	W	L	MF	MA
Panama	5	4	1	11	4
U.S. Virgin Islands	5	4	1	9	6
Costa Rica	5	3	2	9	6
Barbados	5	2	3	8	7
Bermuda	5	2	3	7	8
Eastern Caribbean	5	0	5	1	14

Panama and the US Virgin Islands promoted to Group III for 2004.

== Asia/Oceania Zone ==
=== Group I ===
Second Round Play-offs
Lahore, Pakistan (grass)
Pakistan	3
South Korea	2

First Round Play-offs
Toyota, Japan (indoor carpet)
Japan	5
Pakistan	0
Surabaya, Indonesia (hard)
Indonesia	3
South Korea	2

First Round
New Delhi, India (grass)
1	India	4
Japan	1
Hamilton, New Zealand (hard)
4	New Zealand	5
Pakistan	0
Tashkent, Uzbekistan (indoor hard)
Indonesia	2
3	Uzbekistan	3
Bangkok, Thailand (indoor carpet)
South Korea	1
2	Thailand	4

Second Round
Kolkata, India (grass)
1	India	4
4	New Zealand	1
Tashkent, Uzbekistan (indoor hard)
3	Uzbekistan	1
2	Thailand	4

- South Korea relegated to Group II in 2004.
- India and Thailand advance to World Group Play-off.

=== Group II ===
Play-offs
Dushanbe, Tajikistan (clay)
Iran	5
Tajikistan	0
Manila, Philippines (indoor clay)
Kazakhstan	2
Philippines	3

First Round
Tehran, Iran (indoor clay)
1	Lebanon	3
Iran	2
Causeway Bay, Hong Kong (hard)
4	Hong Kong	4
Tajikistan	1
Taipei, Chinese Taipei (carpet)
Kazakhstan	1
3	Chinese Taipei	4
Wuhan, China (indoor hard)
Philippines	0
2	China	3

Second Round
Colombo, Sri Lanka (hard)
1	Lebanon	1
4	Hong Kong	3
Wuhan, China (hard)
3	Chinese Taipei	3
2	China	2

Third Round
Kaohsiung, Chinese Taipei (hard)
4	Hong Kong	1
3	Chinese Taipei	4

- Tajikistan and Kazakhstan relegated to Group III in 2004.
- Chinese Taipei promoted to Group I in 2004.

=== Group III ===
- Venue: National Tennis Centre, Kuala Lumpur, Malaysia (outdoor hard)
- Date: 23–27 July

Rank	Team
1	Kuwait
2	Malaysia
3	Pacific Oceania
4	Qatar
5	Bahrain
6	Syria
7	United Arab Emirates
8	Kyrgyzstan

- Kuwait and Malaysia promoted to Group II in 2004.
- United Arab Emirates and Kyrgyzstan relegated to Group IV in 2004.

=== Group IV ===
- Venue: National Tennis Centre, Colombo, Sri Lanka (outdoor clay)
- Date: 18–21 June

Rank	Team
1	Vietnam
2	Oman
3	Saudi Arabia
4	Myanmar
5	Sri Lanka
6	Singapore
7	Bangladesh
8	Brunei

- Vietnam and Oman promoted to Group III in 2004.

== Europe/Africa Zone ==
=== Group I ===
Second Round Play-offs
Asker, Norway (clay)
Luxembourg	5
Norway	0
Harare, Zimbabwe (hard)
3	Zimbabwe	3
Italy	2

First Round Play-offs
Luxembourg
bye
Asker, Norway (clay)
4	Finland	4
Norway	1
Ramat Hasharon, Israel (hard)
Israel	5
3	Zimbabwe	0
bye
Italy

First Round
1	Slovakia
bye
Luxembourg
bye
4	Finland
bye
Oslo, Norway (indoor hard)
Austria	5
Norway	0
Minsk, Belarus (carpet)
Belarus	3
Israel	2
bye
3	Zimbabwe
bye
Italy
bye
2	Morocco

Second Round
Esch-sur-Alzette, Lux. (indoor hard)
1	Slovakia	3
Luxembourg	2
St. Anton, Austria (carpet)
4	Finland	2
Austria	3
Minsk, Belarus (carpet)
Belarus	4
3	Zimbabwe	1
Marrakesh, Morocco (clay)
Italy	2
2	Morocco	3

- Norway and Italy relegated to Group II in 2004.
- Slovakia, Austria, Belarus, and Morocco advance to World Group Play-off.

=== Group II ===
The Europe/Africa Zone was one of the three zones of the regional Davis Cup competition in 2003.

In the Europe/Africa Zone there were four different tiers, called groups, in which teams competed against each other to advance to the upper tier. Winners in Group II advanced to the Europe/Africa Zone Group I. Teams who lost their respective ties competed in the relegation play-offs, with winning teams remaining in Group II, whereas teams who lost their play-offs were relegated to the Europe/Africa Zone Group III in 2004.

== Participating nations ==
- Andorra
- Bulgaria
- Denmark
- Egypt
- Ghana
- Greece
- Ireland
- Ivory Coast
- Monaco
- Poland
- Portugal
- Serbia and Montenegro
- Slovenia
- South Africa
- Tunisia
- Ukraine

=== Draw ===
Play-offs
Gdynia, Poland (clay)
Monaco	0
Poland	5
Tunis, Tunisia (clay)
Ghana	1
Tunisia	4
Kakhovka, Ukraine (clay)
Ukraine	3
Ivory Coast	2
Andorra La Vella, Andorra (carpet)
Egypt	3
Andorra	2

First Round
Maia, Portugal (clay)
S	Portugal	4
Monaco	1
Polokwane, South Africa (hard)
S	South Africa	3
Poland	2
Accra, Ghana (hard)
S	Slovenia	4
Ghana	1
Hillerød, Denmark (indoor hard)
S	Denmark	4
Tunisia	1
Sofia, Bulgaria (indoor carpet)
Bulgaria	3
S	Ukraine	2
Belgrade, Serbia-Mont. (indoor carpet)
Serbia and Montenegro	4
S	Ivory Coast	1
Dublin, Ireland (indoor hard)
Egypt	1
S	Ireland	4
Andorra La Vella, Andorra (ind. carpet)
Andorra	1
S	Greece	4

Second Round
Durban, South Africa (hard)
S	Portugal	0
S	South Africa	5
Hornbæk, Denmark (hard)
S	Slovenia	1
S	Denmark	4
Belgrade, Serbia and Montenegro (clay)
Bulgaria	1
Serbia and Montenegro	4
Athens, Greece (clay)
S	Ireland	0
S	Greece	5

Third Round
Brøndby, Denmark (indoor carpet)
S	South Africa	3
S	Denmark	2
Athens, Greece (clay)
Serbia and Montenegro	2
S	Greece	3

- Monaco, Ghana, Ivory Coast, and Andorra relegated to Group III in 2004.
- South Africa and Greece promoted to Group I in 2004.

== First round ==
=== Portugal vs. Monaco ===
Portugal
4
Complexo Municipal de Ténis, Maia, Portugal
4–6 April 2003
Clay

Monaco
1

			1	2	3	4	5
1	(Portugal) (Monaco)	Bernardo Mota; Emmanuel Heussner	7; 5	6; 4	6; 3
2	(Portugal) (Monaco)	Emanuel Couto; Guillaume Couillard	7; 5	6^{2} 7^{7}	6; 3	6; 1
3	(Portugal) (Monaco)	Emanuel Couto / Bernardo Mota; Guillaume Couillard / Emmanuel Heussner	3; 6	7^{9} 6^{7}	6; 2	2; 6	6; 2
4	(Portugal) (Monaco)	Hélder Lopes; Guillaume Couillard	7; 5	6^{7} 7^{9}	7^{7} 6^{2}
5	(Portugal) (Monaco)	Leonardo Tavares; Emmanuel Heussner	2; 6	4; 6

=== South Africa vs. Poland ===
South Africa
3
Pietersburg Tennis Club, Polokwane, South Africa
4–6 April 2003
Hard

Poland
2

			1	2	3	4	5
1	(South Africa) (Poland)	Rik de Voest; Łukasz Kubot	3; 6	6; 1	6; 3	6; 0
2	(South Africa) (Poland)	Wesley Moodie; Mariusz Fyrstenberg	6; 1	6; 2	6; 2
3	(South Africa) (Poland)	David Adams / Robbie Koenig; Mariusz Fyrstenberg / Marcin Matkowski	4; 6	6; 4	6; 2	6; 4
4	(South Africa) (Poland)	Wesley Moodie; Łukasz Kubot	4; 6	6; 2	3; 6
5	(South Africa) (Poland)	Rik de Voest; Bartłomiej Dąbrowski	0; 6	4; 6

=== Ghana vs. Slovenia ===
Ghana
1
Accra Sports Stadium, Accra, Ghana
4–6 April 2003
Hard

Slovenia
4

			1	2	3	4	5
1	(Ghana) (Slovenia)	Mohammed Salifu; Andrej Kračman	4; 6	4; 6	6; 1	7^{7} 6^{3}	6; 8
2	(Ghana) (Slovenia)	Gunther Darkey; Boštjan Ošabnik	6; 4	6; 1	6; 2
3	(Ghana) (Slovenia)	Kwasi Ahenkora / Gunther Darkey; Andrej Kračman / Marko Tkalec	5; 7	4; 6	4; 6
4	(Ghana) (Slovenia)	Gunther Darkey; Marko Tkalec	3; 6	4; 6	6^{5} 7^{7}
5	(Ghana) (Slovenia)	Mohammed Salifu; Boštjan Ošabnik	2; 6	1; 6

=== Denmark vs. Tunisia ===
Denmark
4
Hillerød Tennis Club, Hillerød, Denmark
4–6 April 2003
Hard (indoors)

Tunisia
1

			1	2	3	4	5
1	(Denmark) (Tunisia)	Rasmus Nørby; Walid Jallali	6; 0	4; 6	3; 6	6; 1	2; 6
2	(Denmark) (Tunisia)	Kenneth Carlsen; Haythem Abid	6; 2	6; 1	6; 3
3	(Denmark) (Tunisia)	Kenneth Carlsen / Jonathan Printzlau; Walid Jallali / Malek Jaziri	6; 3	6; 4	6^{4} 7^{7}	3; 6	8; 6
4	(Denmark) (Tunisia)	Kenneth Carlsen; Walid Jallali	6; 3	6; 4	6; 0
5	(Denmark) (Tunisia)	Frederik Nielsen; Malek Jaziri	6; 1	6; 4

=== Bulgaria vs. Ukraine ===
Bulgaria
3
Sofia Tennis Hall, Sofia, Bulgaria
4–6 April 2003
Carpet (indoors)

Ukraine
2

			1	2	3	4	5
1	(Bulgaria) (Ukraine)	Ivaylo Traykov; Orest Tereshchuk	6^{2} 7^{7}	7^{7} 6^{4}	6; 3	6^{6} 7^{8}	4; 6
2	(Bulgaria) (Ukraine)	Radoslav Lukaev; Andrei Dernovskiy	6; 3	6^{6} 7^{8}	6; 3	6; 2
3	(Bulgaria) (Ukraine)	Todor Enev / Radoslav Lukaev; Andrei Dernovskiy / Orest Tereshchuk	6; 3	6; 4	6; 4
4	(Bulgaria) (Ukraine)	Radoslav Lukaev; Orest Tereshchuk	6; 3	3; 6	6^{7} 7^{9}	3; 6
5	(Bulgaria) (Ukraine)	Ivaylo Traykov; Andrey Stepanov	7^{7} 6^{3}	6; 4	7^{7} 6^{3}

=== Serbia and Montenegro vs. Ivory Coast ===
Serbia and Montenegro
4
Gemax Tennis Club, Belgrade, Serbia and Montenegro
4–6 April 2003
Carpet (indoors)

Ivory Coast
1

			1	2	3	4	5
1	(Serbia and Montenegro) (Ivory Coast)	Janko Tipsarević; Valentin Sanon	6; 4	3; 6	3; 6	6; 3	2; 6
2	(Serbia and Montenegro) (Ivory Coast)	Dušan Vemić; Claude N'Goran	6; 4	6^{6} 7^{8}	6; 4	7; 5
3	(Serbia and Montenegro) (Ivory Coast)	Dušan Vemić / Nenad Zimonjić; Claude N'Goran / Valentin Sanon	7; 5	6; 3	6; 4
4	(Serbia and Montenegro) (Ivory Coast)	Janko Tipsarević; Claude N'Goran	6; 2	6; 3	7; 5
5	(Serbia and Montenegro) (Ivory Coast)	Ilija Bozoljac; Jean-Christophe Nabi	6; 4	6; 2

=== Ireland vs. Egypt ===
Ireland
4
Fitzwilliam Lawn Tennis Club, Dublin, Ireland
4–6 April 2003
Hard (indoors)

Egypt
1

			1	2	3	4	5
1	(Republic of Ireland) (Egypt)	Stephen Nugent; Mohamed Mamoun	4; 6	7^{7} 6^{4}	3; 6	4; 6
2	(Republic of Ireland) (Egypt)	John Doran; Amr Ghoneim	3; 6	7^{7} 6^{5}	6; 1	6; 3
3	(Republic of Ireland) (Egypt)	John Doran / David J. Mullins; Karim Maamoun / Mohamed Mamoun	7; 5	6; 1	6; 2
4	(Republic of Ireland) (Egypt)	John Doran; Mohamed Mamoun	7^{7} 6^{3}	6; 3	7; 5
5	(Republic of Ireland) (Egypt)	Sean Cooper; Karim Maamoun	6; 3	3; 6	6; 2

=== Andorra vs. Greece ===
Andorra
1
Poliesportiu d'Andorra, Andorra la Vella, Andorra
4–6 April 2003
Carpet (indoors)

Greece
4

			1	2	3	4	5
1	(Andorra) (Greece)	Kenneth Tuilier-Curco; Vasilis Mazarakis	1; 6	0; 6	1; 6
2	(Andorra) (Greece)	Joan Jiménez Guerra; Konstantinos Economidis	4; 6	4; 6	3; 6
3	(Andorra) (Greece)	Pau Gerbaud-Farras / Joan Jiménez Guerra; Konstantinos Economidis / Vasilis Mazarakis	2; 6	2; 6	6; 3	6; 4	4; 6
4	(Andorra) (Greece)	Joan Jiménez Guerra; Nikos Rovas	6; 3	4; 6	3; 6
5	(Andorra) (Greece)	Marc Vilanova; Alexandros Jakoubovits						w/o

== Second round ==
=== South Africa vs. Portugal ===
South Africa
5
Westridge Park, Durban, South Africa
11–13 July 2003
Hard

Portugal
0

			1	2	3	4	5
1	(South Africa) (Portugal)	Rik de Voest; Hélder Lopes	7^{7} 6^{3}	6; 1	6; 4
2	(South Africa) (Portugal)	Wesley Moodie; Leonardo Tavares	6; 3	6; 4	1; 6	7^{9} 6^{7}
3	(South Africa) (Portugal)	Chris Haggard / Robbie Koenig; Leonardo Tavares / Rui Machado	7; 5	6; 3	6; 2
4	(South Africa) (Portugal)	Wesley Moodie; Rui Machado	2; 6	6; 1	6; 2
5	(South Africa) (Portugal)	Rik de Voest; Leonardo Tavares	6; 1	6; 4

=== Denmark vs. Slovenia ===
Denmark
4
Havreholm Castle, Hornbæk, Denmark
11–13 July 2003
Hard

Slovenia
1

			1	2	3	4	5
1	(Denmark) (Slovenia)	Kenneth Carlsen; Boštjan Ošabnik	6; 4	7; 5	6; 4
2	(Denmark) (Slovenia)	Mik Ledvonova; Marko Tkalec	4; 6	7; 5	4; 6	6; 3	3; 6
3	(Denmark) (Slovenia)	Kenneth Carlsen / Jonathan Printzlau; Boštjan Ošabnik / Rok Jarc	6; 3	6; 4	6^{4} 7^{7}	6; 1
4	(Denmark) (Slovenia)	Kenneth Carlsen; Marko Tkalec	6; 2	6; 2	6; 4
5	(Denmark) (Slovenia)	Mik Ledvonova; Nejc Podkrajšek	1; 6	6; 2	6; 0

=== Serbia and Montenegro vs. Bulgaria ===
Serbia and Montenegro
4
Tennis Club 'Djukić', Belgrade, Serbia and Montenegro
11–13 July 2003
Clay

Bulgaria
1

			1	2	3	4	5
1	(Serbia and Montenegro) (Bulgaria)	Janko Tipsarević; Ilia Kushev	6; 3	1; 6	6; 2	6; 3
2	(Serbia and Montenegro) (Bulgaria)	Boris Pašanski; Radoslav Lukaev	6; 3	4; 6	7^{7} 6^{3}	4; 6	4; 6
3	(Serbia and Montenegro) (Bulgaria)	Dejan Petrović / Nenad Zimonjić; Todor Enev / Radoslav Lukaev	6; 3	6; 1	6; 2
4	(Serbia and Montenegro) (Bulgaria)	Janko Tipsarević; Radoslav Lukaev	6; 3	6; 1	6; 3
5	(Serbia and Montenegro) (Bulgaria)	Boris Pašanski; Todor Enev	6; 2	6; 4

=== Greece vs. Ireland ===
Greece
5
Athens Lawn Tennis Club, Athens, Greece
11–13 July 2003
Clay

Ireland
0

			1	2	3	4	5
1	(Greece) (Republic of Ireland)	Konstantinos Economidis; Peter Clarke	7^{7} 6^{2}	6; 3	6; 4
2	(Greece) (Republic of Ireland)	Vasilis Mazarakis; Conor Niland	6; 2	2; 6	6^{1} 7^{7}	6; 1	6; 3
3	(Greece) (Republic of Ireland)	Konstantinos Economidis / Vasilis Mazarakis; John Doran / David J. Mullins	6; 2	7; 5	6; 1
4	(Greece) (Republic of Ireland)	Nikos Rovas; John Doran	4; 6	5; 4				retired
5	(Greece) (Republic of Ireland)	Solon Peppas; Conor Niland	6; 3	4; 6	6; 4

== Relegation play-offs ==
=== Poland vs. Monaco ===
Poland
5
Arka T.C., Gdynia, Poland
11–13 July 2003
Clay

Monaco
0

			1	2	3	4	5
1	(Poland) (Monaco)	Mariusz Fyrstenberg; Emmanuel Heussner	6; 4	6^{3} 7^{7}	6; 3	6; 1
2	(Poland) (Monaco)	Bartłomiej Dąbrowski; Guillaume Couillard	6; 4	6; 3	6; 2
3	(Poland) (Monaco)	Marcin Matkowski / Radosław Nijaki; Guillaume Couillard / Emmanuel Heussner	7^{7} 6^{3}	6; 4	6; 3
4	(Poland) (Monaco)	Radosław Nijaki; Guillaume Couillard	6; 4	6^{6} 7^{8}	6; 2
5	(Poland) (Monaco)	Marcin Matkowski; Emmanuel Heussner	4; 6	6; 3	6; 4

=== Tunisia vs. Ghana ===
Tunisia
4
Tennis Club de Tunis, Tunis, Tunisia
11–13 July 2003
Clay

Ghana
1

			1	2	3	4	5
1	(Tunisia) (Ghana)	Haythem Abid; Gunther Darkey	7^{7} 6^{2}	7; 5	2; 6	6; 4
2	(Tunisia) (Ghana)	Walid Jallali; Mohammed Salifu	6; 0	6; 2	6; 1
3	(Tunisia) (Ghana)	Walid Jallali / Issam Jellali; Gunther Darkey / Samuel Fumi	6; 4	7; 5	6; 3
4	(Tunisia) (Ghana)	Walid Jallali; Kwasi Ahenkora	6; 4	6; 0
5	(Tunisia) (Ghana)	Tarek Ben Soltane; Mohammed Salifu	6; 2	5; 7	3; 6

=== Ukraine vs. Ivory Coast ===
Ukraine
3
Sport Complex Energy, Kakhovka, Ukraine
11–13 July 2003
Clay

Ivory Coast
2

			1	2	3	4	5
1	(Ukraine) (Ivory Coast)	Nikolai Dyachok; Claude N'Goran	4; 6	2; 6	2; 6
2	(Ukraine) (Ivory Coast)	Orest Tereshchuk; Valentin Sanon	6; 1	6; 3	6; 3
3	(Ukraine) (Ivory Coast)	Andrei Dernovskiy / Orest Tereshchuk; Claude N'Goran / Valentin Sanon	6; 3	6; 2	6; 2
4	(Ukraine) (Ivory Coast)	Orest Tereshchuk; Claude N'Goran	4; 6	2; 6	4; 6
5	(Ukraine) (Ivory Coast)	Sergei Yaroshenko; Valentin Sanon	4; 6	6; 4	2; 6	6; 3	6; 3

=== Andorra vs. Egypt ===
Andorra
2
Poliesportiu d'Andorra, Andorra la Vella, Andorra
11–13 July 2003
Carpet (indoors)

Egypt
3

			1	2	3	4	5
1	(Andorra) (Egypt)	Joan Jiménez Guerra; Mohamed Mamoun	6; 3	3; 6	6; 3	7^{7} 6^{3}
2	(Andorra) (Egypt)	Kenneth Tuilier-Curco; Karim Maamoun	2; 6	0; 6	7^{7} 6^{0}	1; 6
3	(Andorra) (Egypt)	Pau Gerbaud-Farras / Joan Jiménez Guerra; Amr Ghoneim / Mohamed Mamoun	7; 5	6^{5} 7^{7}	4; 6	4; 6
4	(Andorra) (Egypt)	Joan Jiménez Guerra; Karim Maamoun	6; 4	6^{2} 7^{7}	7^{8} 6^{6}	4; 6	6; 8
5	(Andorra) (Egypt)	Pau Gerbaud-Farras; Mohammed Fawzy	7^{7} 6^{4}	6; 4

== Third round ==
=== Denmark vs. South Africa ===
Denmark
2
Odense Idrætshal, Brøndby, Denmark
19–21 September 2003
Carpet (indoors)

South Africa
3

			1	2	3	4	5
1	(Denmark) (South Africa)	Frederik Fetterlein; Wayne Ferreira	1; 6	1; 6	6^{3} 7^{7}
2	(Denmark) (South Africa)	Kenneth Carlsen; Wesley Moodie	6^{1} 7^{7}	7^{7} 6^{3}	6; 3	6; 4
3	(Denmark) (South Africa)	Kenneth Carlsen / Frederik Fetterlein; Wayne Ferreira / Chris Haggard	3; 6	5; 7	6^{5} 7^{7}
4	(Denmark) (South Africa)	Kenneth Carlsen; Wayne Ferreira	6; 1	7^{7} 6^{5}	6; 2
5	(Denmark) (South Africa)	Frederik Nielsen; Wesley Moodie	4; 6	4; 6	4; 6

=== Greece vs. Serbia and Montenegro ===
Greece
3
Athens Lawn Tennis Club, Athens, Greece
19–21 September 2003
Clay

Serbia and Montenegro
2

			1	2	3	4	5
1	(Greece) (Serbia and Montenegro)	Solon Peppas; Janko Tipsarević	6; 3	3; 6	2; 6	6; 2	3; 6
2	(Greece) (Serbia and Montenegro)	Konstantinos Economidis; Boris Pašanski	6; 2	6; 4	6; 2
3	(Greece) (Serbia and Montenegro)	Eleftherios- Spyridon Alexiou / Alexandros Jakoubovits; Dejan Petrović / Nenad Zimonjić	6^{6} 7^{8}	6; 3	6; 2	6; 4
4	(Greece) (Serbia and Montenegro)	Konstantinos Economidis; Janko Tipsarević	6; 0	7^{8} 6^{6}	6; 4
5	(Greece) (Serbia and Montenegro)	Alexandros Jakoubovits; Boris Pašanski	4; 6	3; 6

=== Group III ===
==== Zone A ====
- Venue: Sidi Fredj T.C., Algiers, Algeria (outdoor clay)
- Date: 3–7 February

The Europe/Africa Zone was one of the three zones of the regional Davis Cup competition in 2003.

In the Europe/Africa Zone there were four different tiers, called groups, in which teams competed against each other to advance to the upper tier. Group III was split into two tournaments. One tournament was held in Sidi Fredj T.C., Algiers, Algeria, February 3–7, on outdoor clay courts, while the other was held in State Tennis Centre, Jūrmala, Latvia, June 11–15, on outdoor clay courts.

== Format ==
The eight teams in the Algiers tournament were split into two pools and played in a round-robin format. The top two teams of each pool advanced to the promotion pool, from which the two top teams were promoted to the Europe/Africa Zone Group II in 2004. The bottom two teams of each group were placed in the relegation pool, from which the two bottom teams were demoted to the Europe/Africa Zone Group IV in 2004.

== Pool A ==
Team	Pld	W	L	MF	MA
Hungary	3	3	0	9	0
Estonia	3	2	1	6	3
Madagascar	3	1	2	3	6
Namibia	3	0	3	0	9

=== Hungary vs. Estonia ===
Hungary
3
Sidi Fredj T.C., Algiers, Algeria
3 February 2003
Clay

Estonia
0

			1	2	3
1	(Hungary) (Estonia)	Gergely Kisgyörgy; Andrei Luzgin	6; 2	6; 1
2	(Hungary) (Estonia)	Kornél Bardóczky; Mait Künnap	6; 3	6; 1
3	(Hungary) (Estonia)	László Fonó / Sebő Kiss; Mait Künnap / Gert Vilms	4; 6	6; 4	11; 9

=== Madagascar vs. Namibia ===
Madagascar
3
Sidi Fredj T.C., Algiers, Algeria
3 February 2003
Clay

Namibia
0

			1	2	3
1	(Madagascar) (Namibia)	Lalaina Ratsimbazafy; Henrico Du Plessis	4; 6	7^{7} 6^{4}	6; 2
2	(Madagascar) (Namibia)	Donne-Dubert Radison; Jean-Pierre Huish	6; 2	6; 2
3	(Madagascar) (Namibia)	Donne-Dubert Radison / Jean-Marc Randriamanalina; Nicky Buys / Henrico Du Plessis	3; 6	6; 3	6; 2

=== Hungary vs. Madagascar ===
Hungary
3
Sidi Fredj T.C., Algiers, Algeria
4 February 2003
Clay

Madagascar
0

			1	2	3
1	(Hungary) (Madagascar)	Gergely Kisgyörgy; Lalaina Ratsimbazafy	6; 2	6; 2
2	(Hungary) (Madagascar)	Kornél Bardóczky; Donne-Dubert Radison	6; 0	7; 5
3	(Hungary) (Madagascar)	László Fonó / Sebő Kiss; Donne-Dubert Radison / Lalaina Ratsimbazafy	6; 2	6; 0

=== Estonia vs. Namibia ===
Estonia
3
Sidi Fredj T.C., Algiers, Algeria
4 February 2003
Clay

Namibia
0

			1	2	3
1	(Estonia) (Namibia)	Mait Künnap; Henrico Du Plessis	6; 1	6; 2
2	(Estonia) (Namibia)	Gert Vilms; Jean-Pierre Huish	6; 2	6; 2
3	(Estonia) (Namibia)	Mait Künnap / Andrei Luzgin; Jean-Pierre Huish / Jurgens Strydom	6; 3	4; 6	6; 3

=== Hungary vs. Namibia ===
Hungary
3
Sidi Fredj T.C., Algiers, Algeria
5 February 2003
Clay

Namibia
0

			1	2	3
1	(Hungary) (Namibia)	Gergely Kisgyörgy; Nicky Buys	6; 0	6; 0
2	(Hungary) (Namibia)	Kornél Bardóczky; Jean-Pierre Huish	6; 1	7; 1
3	(Hungary) (Namibia)	László Fonó / Sebő Kiss; Nicky Buys / Jurgens Strydom	6; 0	6; 3

=== Estonia vs. Madagascar ===
Estonia
3
Sidi Fredj T.C., Algiers, Algeria
5 February 2003
Clay

Madagascar
0

			1	2	3
1	(Estonia) (Madagascar)	Andrei Luzgin; Lalaina Ratsimbazafy	7; 5	7^{7} 6^{1}
2	(Estonia) (Madagascar)	Gert Vilms; Donne-Dubert Radison	6; 3	7; 5
3	(Estonia) (Madagascar)	Mait Künnap / Andrei Luzgin; Jean-Marc Randriamanalina / Lalaina Ratsimbazafy	6; 1	6; 1

== Pool B ==
Team	Pld	W	L	MF	MA
Algeria	3	3	0	8	1
Lithuania	3	2	1	6	3
Angola	3	1	2	3	6
Armenia	3	0	3	1	8

=== Armenia vs. Lithuania ===
Armenia
0
Sidi Fredj T.C., Algiers, Algeria
3 February 2003
Clay

Lithuania
3

			1	2	3
1	(Armenia) (Lithuania)	Hayk Hakobyan; Aivaras Balžekas	3; 6	3; 6
2	(Armenia) (Lithuania)	Hayk Zohranyan; Rolandas Muraška	1; 6	0; 6
3	(Armenia) (Lithuania)	Hayk Hakobyan / Hayk Zohranyan; Aivaras Balžekas / Rolandas Muraška	2; 6	2; 6

=== Algeria vs. Angola ===
Algeria
3
Sidi Fredj T.C., Algiers, Algeria
3 February 2003
Clay

Angola
0

			1	2	3
1	(Algeria) (Angola)	Abdelhak Hameurlaïne; Nélson Almeida	7; 5	7; 5
2	(Algeria) (Angola)	Lamine Ouahab; José Nenganga	6; 1	6; 1
3	(Algeria) (Angola)	Noureddine Mahmoudi / Lamine Ouahab; João-Sebastião Miguel / José Nenganga	6; 2	6; 1

=== Armenia vs. Algeria ===
Armenia
0
Sidi Fredj T.C., Algiers, Algeria
4 February 2003
Clay

Algeria
3

			1	2	3
1	(Armenia) (Algeria)	Hayk Hakobyan; Noureddine Mahmoudi	2; 6	2; 6
2	(Armenia) (Algeria)	Hayk Zohranyan; Abdelhak Hameurlaïne	1; 6	3; 6
3	(Armenia) (Algeria)	Hayk Hakobyan / Hayk Zohranyan; Sofiane Dob / Lamine Ouahab	4; 6	2; 6

=== Lithuania vs. Angola ===
Lithuania
2
Sidi Fredj T.C., Algiers, Algeria
4 February 2003
Clay

Angola
1

			1	2	3
1	(Lithuania) (Angola)	Aivaras Balžekas; Nélson Almeida	7^{9} 6^{7}	6; 3
2	(Lithuania) (Angola)	Rolandas Muraška; José Nenganga	6; 1	6; 3
3	(Lithuania) (Angola)	Aurimas Karpavičius / Gvidas Sabeckis; Nélson Almeida / José Nenganga	2; 6	6; 2	3; 6

=== Armenia vs. Angola ===
Armenia
1
Sidi Fredj T.C., Algiers, Algeria
5 February 2003
Clay

Angola
2

			1	2	3
1	(Armenia) (Angola)	Hayk Hakobyan; Nélson Almeida	5; 7	6; 0	6; 8
2	(Armenia) (Angola)	Hayk Zohranyan; José Nenganga	7; 5	7; 5
3	(Armenia) (Angola)	Hayk Hakobyan / Hayk Zohranyan; Nélson Almeida / José Nenganga	6; 4	4; 6	3; 6

=== Lithuania vs. Algeria ===
Lithuania
1
Sidi Fredj T.C., Algiers, Algeria
5 February 2003
Clay

Algeria
2

			1	2	3
1	(Lithuania) (Algeria)	Aivaras Balžekas; Abdelhak Hameurlaïne	6; 1	3; 6	7; 9
2	(Lithuania) (Algeria)	Rolandas Muraška; Lamine Ouahab	1; 6	2; 6
3	(Lithuania) (Algeria)	Rolandas Muraška / Gvidas Sabeckis; Sofiane Dob / Noureddine Mahmoudi	6; 3	6; 2

== Promotion pool ==
Team	Pld	W	L	MF	MA
Algeria	3	3	0	6	2
Hungary	3	2	1	6	2
Estonia	3	1	2	3	6
Lithuania	3	0	3	2	7

Algeria and Hungary promoted to Group II for 2004.

=== Hungary vs. Lithuania ===
Hungary
3
Sidi Fredj T.C., Algiers, Algeria
6 February 2003
Clay

Lithuania
0

			1	2	3
1	(Hungary) (Lithuania)	Gergely Kisgyörgy; Aivaras Balžekas	6; 2	6; 2
2	(Hungary) (Lithuania)	Kornél Bardóczky; Rolandas Muraška	6; 2	6; 3
3	(Hungary) (Lithuania)	László Fonó / Sebő Kiss; Rolandas Muraška / Gvidas Sabeckis	6; 1	6; 2

=== Algeria vs. Estonia ===
Algeria
2
Sidi Fredj T.C., Algiers, Algeria
6 February 2003
Clay

Estonia
1

			1	2	3
1	(Algeria) (Estonia)	Abdelhak Hameurlaïne; Mait Künnap	2; 6	1; 6
2	(Algeria) (Estonia)	Lamine Ouahab; Gert Vilms	6; 4	6; 0
3	(Algeria) (Estonia)	Noureddine Mahmoudi / Lamine Ouahab; Mait Künnap / Gert Vilms	7; 5	6; 3

=== Hungary vs. Algeria ===
Hungary
0
Sidi Fredj T.C., Algiers, Algeria
7 February 2003
Clay

Algeria
2

			1	2	3
1	(Hungary) (Algeria)	Sebő Kiss; Noureddine Mahmoudi	6; 1	5; 7	3; 6
2	(Hungary) (Algeria)	László Fonó; Lamine Ouahab	5; 7	3; 6
3	(Hungary) (Algeria)	László Fonó / Sebő Kiss; Noureddine Mahmoudi / Lamine Ouahab				not played

=== Lithuania vs. Estonia ===
Lithuania
1
Sidi Fredj T.C., Algiers, Algeria
7 February 2003
Clay

Estonia
2

			1	2	3
1	(Lithuania) (Estonia)	Aurimas Karpavičius; Andrei Luzgin	6; 1	6^{5} 7^{7}	2; 6
2	(Lithuania) (Estonia)	Rolandas Muraška; Mait Künnap	6; 0	6; 4
3	(Lithuania) (Estonia)	Rolandas Muraška / Gvidas Sabeckis; Mait Künnap / Andrei Luzgin	3; 6	6; 4	4; 6

== Relegation pool ==
The bottom two teams from Pools A and B were placed in the relegation group. Results and points from games against the opponent from the preliminary round were carried forward.

Team	Pld	W	L	MF	MA
Madagascar	3	2	1	6	3
Namibia	3	2	1	5	4
Angola	3	2	1	5	4
Armenia	3	0	3	2	7

Angola and Armenia demoted to Group IV for 2004.

=== Madagascar vs. Armenia ===
Madagascar
2
Sidi Fredj T.C., Algiers, Algeria
6 February 2003
Clay

Armenia
1

			1	2	3
1	(Madagascar) (Armenia)	Lalaina Ratsimbazafy; Tsolak Gevorgyan	6; 3	2; 6	3; 6
2	(Madagascar) (Armenia)	Donne-Dubert Radison; Hayk Zohranyan	6; 2	6; 0
3	(Madagascar) (Armenia)	Donne-Dubert Radison / Lalaina Ratsimbazafy; Tsolak Gevorgyan / Hayk Hakobyan	6; 3	5; 7	8; 6

=== Angola vs. Namibia ===
Angola
1
Sidi Fredj T.C., Algiers, Algeria
6 February 2003
Clay

Namibia
2

			1	2	3
1	(Angola) (Namibia)	Nélson Almeida; Henrico Du Plessis	6; 3	6; 3
2	(Angola) (Namibia)	José Nenganga; Jean-Pierre Huish	6^{6} 7^{8}	7; 5	3; 6
3	(Angola) (Namibia)	Nélson Almeida / José Nenganga; Henrico Du Plessis / Jean-Pierre Huish	3; 6	1; 6

=== Madagascar vs. Angola ===
Madagascar
1
Sidi Fredj T.C., Algiers, Algeria
7 February 2003
Clay

Angola
2

			1	2	3
1	(Madagascar) (Angola)	Lalaina Ratsimbazafy; João-Sebastião Miguel	6; 2	6; 3
2	(Madagascar) (Angola)	Donne-Dubert Radison; Nélson Almeida	3; 6	4; 6
3	(Madagascar) (Angola)	Donne-Dubert Radison / Lalaina Ratsimbazafy; Nélson Almeida / José Nenganga	6; 3	3; 6	7; 9

=== Armenia vs. Namibia ===
Armenia
0
Sidi Fredj T.C., Algiers, Algeria
7 February 2003
Clay

Namibia
3

			1	2	3
1	(Armenia) (Namibia)	Hayk Hakobyan; Henrico Du Plessis	2; 6	6; 1	1; 6
2	(Armenia) (Namibia)	Tsolak Gevorgyan; Jean-Pierre Huish	1; 6	6; 1	3; 6
3	(Armenia) (Namibia)	Tsolak Gevorgyan / Hayk Hakobyan; Henrico Du Plessis / Jean-Pierre Huish				w/o

== Final standings ==
Rank	Team
1	Algeria
2	Hungary
3	Estonia
4	Lithuania
5	Madagascar
6	Namibia
7	Angola
8	Armenia

- Algeria and Hungary promoted to Group II in 2004.
- Angola and Armenia relegated to Group IV in 2004.

=== Zone B ===
- Venue: State Tennis Centre, Jūrmala, Latvia (outdoor clay)
- Date: 11–15 June

The Europe/Africa Zone was one of the three zones of the regional Davis Cup competition in 2003.

In the Europe/Africa Zone there were four different tiers, called groups, in which teams competed against each other to advance to the upper tier. Group III was split into two tournaments. One tournament was held in Sidi Fredj T.C., Algiers, Algeria, February 3–7, on outdoor clay courts, while the other was held in State Tennis Centre, Jūrmala, Latvia, June 11–15, on outdoor clay courts.

== Format ==
The eight teams in the Jūrmala tournament were split into two pools and played in a round-robin format. The top two teams of each pool advanced to the promotion pool, from which the two top teams were promoted to the Europe/Africa Zone Group II in 2004. The bottom two teams of each group were placed in the relegation pool, from which the two bottom teams were demoted to the Europe/Africa Zone Group IV in 2004.

== Pool A ==
Team	Pld	W	L	MF	MA
Latvia	3	3	0	7	2
Azerbaijan	3	2	1	5	4
North Macedonia	3	1	2	3	6
Moldova	3	0	3	3	6

=== Moldova vs. Latvia ===
Moldova
1
State Tennis Centre, Jūrmala, Latvia
11 June 2003
Clay

Latvia
2

			1	2	3
1	(Moldova) (Latvia)	Andrei Ciumac; Andis Juška	6; 4	2; 6	1; 6
2	(Moldova) (Latvia)	Andrei Gorban; Deniss Pavlovs	7^{8} 6^{6}	4; 6	8; 6
3	(Moldova) (Latvia)	Sergei Cupțov / Andrei Gorban; Andris Fiļimonovs / Andis Juška	2; 6	4; 6

=== Azerbaijan vs. North Macedonia ===
Azerbaijan
2
State Tennis Centre, Jūrmala, Latvia
11 June 2003
Clay

North Macedonia
1

			1	2	3
1	(Azerbaijan) (North Macedonia)	Farid Shirinov; Zoran Ševčenko	1; 6	6; 4	4; 6
2	(Azerbaijan) (North Macedonia)	Emin Ağayev; Predrag Rusevski	2; 6	6; 1	8; 6
3	(Azerbaijan) (North Macedonia)	Emin Ağayev / Farid Shirinov; Predrag Rusevski / Zoran Ševčenko	6; 3	7; 5

=== Moldova vs. North Macedonia ===
Moldova
1
State Tennis Centre, Jūrmala, Latvia
12 June 2003
Clay

North Macedonia
2

			1	2	3
1	(Moldova) (North Macedonia)	Andrei Ciumac; Predrag Rusevski	6; 4	0; 6	2; 6
2	(Moldova) (North Macedonia)	Andrei Gorban; Kristian Mitrovski	6; 2	6; 2
3	(Moldova) (North Macedonia)	Andrei Gorban / Denys Molchanov; Predrag Rusevski / Zoran Ševčenko	6^{6} 7^{8}	2; 6

=== Azerbaijan vs. Latvia ===
Azerbaijan
1
State Tennis Centre, Jūrmala, Latvia
12 June 2003
Clay

Latvia
2

			1	2	3
1	(Azerbaijan) (Latvia)	Farid Shirinov; Andis Juška	1; 6	2; 6
2	(Azerbaijan) (Latvia)	Emin Ağayev; Nikita Svacko	6; 3	6; 3
3	(Azerbaijan) (Latvia)	Emin Ağayev / Farid Shirinov; Andris Fiļimonovs / Andis Juška	4; 6	4; 6

=== Moldova vs. Azerbaijan ===
Moldova
1
State Tennis Centre, Jūrmala, Latvia
13 June 2003
Clay

Azerbaijan
2

			1	2	3
1	(Moldova) (Azerbaijan)	Denys Molchanov; Talat Rahimov	6; 0	6; 2
2	(Moldova) (Azerbaijan)	Andrei Gorban; Emin Ağayev	7^{7} 6^{3}	4; 6	1; 6
3	(Moldova) (Azerbaijan)	Andrei Ciumac / Andrei Gorban; Emin Ağayev / Farid Shirinov	4; 6	2; 6

=== North Macedonia vs. Latvia ===
North Macedonia
0
State Tennis Centre, Jūrmala, Latvia
13 June 2003
Clay

Latvia
3

			1	2	3
1	(North Macedonia) (Latvia)	Zoran Ševčenko; Andis Juška	4; 6	1; 6
2	(North Macedonia) (Latvia)	Predrag Rusevski; Deniss Pavlovs	4; 6	2; 6
3	(North Macedonia) (Latvia)	Dimitar Grabul / Kristian Mitrovski; Andris Fiļimonovs / Nikita Svacko	1; 6	2; 6

== Pool B ==
Team	Pld	W	L	MF	MA
Georgia	3	3	0	7	2
Cyprus	3	2	1	7	2
Turkey	3	1	2	3	6
Bosnia and Herzegovina	3	0	3	1	8

=== Georgia vs. Bosnia and Herzegovina ===
Georgia
3
State Tennis Centre, Jūrmala, Latvia
11 June 2003
Clay

Bosnia and Herzegovina
0

			1	2	3
1	(Georgia (country)) (Bosnia and Herzegovina)	Irakli Ushangishvili; Zlatan Kadrić	6; 4	6; 2
2	(Georgia (country)) (Bosnia and Herzegovina)	Irakli Labadze; Igor Račić	6; 2	6; 3
3	(Georgia (country)) (Bosnia and Herzegovina)	Irakli Labadze / Irakli Ushangishvili; Ivan Dodig / Zlatan Kadrić	6; 3	6; 1

=== Cyprus vs. Turkey ===
Cyprus
3
State Tennis Centre, Jūrmala, Latvia
11 June 2003
Clay

Turkey
0

			1	2	3
1	(Cyprus) (Turkey)	Photos Kallias; Ergün Zorlu	2; 6	6; 4	9; 7
2	(Cyprus) (Turkey)	Marcos Baghdatis; Haluk Akkoyun	6; 3	6; 0
3	(Cyprus) (Turkey)	Marcos Baghdatis / Dinos Pavlou; Doruk Bağlan / Ergün Zorlu	6; 2	6; 3

=== Georgia vs. Turkey ===
Georgia
2
State Tennis Centre, Jūrmala, Latvia
12 June 2003
Clay

Turkey
1

			1	2	3
1	(Georgia (country)) (Turkey)	Irakli Ushangishvili; Ergün Zorlu	4; 6	7^{9} 6^{7}	7; 5
2	(Georgia (country)) (Turkey)	Irakli Labadze; Haluk Akkoyun	6; 2	6; 1
3	(Georgia (country)) (Turkey)	David Kvernadze / Omari Murgulia; Haluk Akkoyun / Esat Tanık	0; 6	2; 6

=== Cyprus vs. Bosnia and Herzegovina ===
Cyprus
3
State Tennis Centre, Jūrmala, Latvia
12 June 2003
Clay

Bosnia and Herzegovina
0

			1	2	3
1	(Cyprus) (Bosnia and Herzegovina)	Photos Kallias; Ivan Dodig	6; 2	6; 1
2	(Cyprus) (Bosnia and Herzegovina)	Marcos Baghdatis; Igor Račić	6; 1	6; 3
3	(Cyprus) (Bosnia and Herzegovina)	Marcos Baghdatis / Dinos Pavlou; Ivan Dodig / Zlatan Kadrić	7; 5	6; 3

=== Georgia vs. Cyprus ===
Georgia
2
State Tennis Centre, Jūrmala, Latvia
13 June 2003
Clay

Cyprus
1

			1	2	3
1	(Georgia (country)) (Cyprus)	Irakli Ushangishvili; Photos Kallias	2; 6	6; 1	2; 6
2	(Georgia (country)) (Cyprus)	Irakli Labadze; Marcos Baghdatis	3; 6	6; 3	6; 4
3	(Georgia (country)) (Cyprus)	Irakli Labadze / Irakli Ushangishvili; Marcos Baghdatis / Dinos Pavlou	7^{7} 6^{3}	7; 5

=== Turkey vs. Bosnia and Herzegovina ===
Turkey
2
State Tennis Centre, Jūrmala, Latvia
13 June 2003
Clay

Bosnia and Herzegovina
1

			1	2	3
1	(Turkey) (Bosnia and Herzegovina)	Ergün Zorlu; Haris Bašalić	6; 4	6; 2
2	(Turkey) (Bosnia and Herzegovina)	Haluk Akkoyun; Igor Račić	2; 6	6^{3} 7^{7}
3	(Turkey) (Bosnia and Herzegovina)	Haluk Akkoyun / Ergün Zorlu; Ivan Dodig / Igor Račić	6; 0	6; 3

== Promotion pool ==
The top two teams from each of Pools A and B advanced to the Promotion pool. Results and points from games against the opponent from the preliminary round were carried forward.

Team	Pld	W	L	MF	MA
Georgia	3	3	0	7	2
Latvia	3	2	1	5	4
Cyprus	3	1	2	5	4
Azerbaijan	3	0	3	1	8

Georgia and Latvia promoted to Group II for 2004.

=== Georgia vs. Azerbaijan ===
Georgia
3
State Tennis Centre, Jūrmala, Latvia
14 June 2003
Clay

Azerbaijan
0

			1	2	3
1	(Georgia (country)) (Azerbaijan)	Irakli Ushangishvili; Farid Shirinov	7; 5	6; 2
2	(Georgia (country)) (Azerbaijan)	Irakli Labadze; Emin Ağayev	1; 0			retired
3	(Georgia (country)) (Azerbaijan)	Irakli Labadze / Irakli Ushangishvili; Fakhraddin Shirinov / Farid Shirinov	6; 1	6; 1

=== Cyprus vs. Latvia ===
Cyprus
1
State Tennis Centre, Jūrmala, Latvia
14 June 2003
Clay

Latvia
2

			1	2	3
1	(Cyprus) (Latvia)	Photos Kallias; Andis Juška	6^{10} 7^{12}	2; 6
2	(Cyprus) (Latvia)	Marcos Baghdatis; Nikita Svacko	6; 1	6; 1
3	(Cyprus) (Latvia)	Marcos Baghdatis / Dinos Pavlou; Andris Fiļimonovs / Andis Juška	2; 6	6; 3	3; 6

=== Georgia vs. Latvia ===
Georgia
2
State Tennis Centre, Jūrmala, Latvia
15 June 2003
Clay

Latvia
1

			1	2	3
1	(Georgia (country)) (Latvia)	Irakli Ushangishvili; Andis Juška	6; 3	6^{5} 7^{7}	6; 4
2	(Georgia (country)) (Latvia)	Irakli Labadze; Nikita Svacko	6; 2	6; 4
3	(Georgia (country)) (Latvia)	David Kvernadze / Omari Murgulia; Andris Fiļimonovs / Nikita Svacko	3; 6	3; 6

=== Cyprus vs. Azerbaijan ===
Cyprus
3
State Tennis Centre, Jūrmala, Latvia
15 June 2003
Clay

Azerbaijan
0

			1	2	3
1	(Cyprus) (Azerbaijan)	Photos Kallias; Farid Shirinov	6; 1	6; 1
2	(Cyprus) (Azerbaijan)	Marcos Baghdatis; Fakhraddin Shirinov	6; 2	6; 2
3	(Cyprus) (Azerbaijan)	Eleftherios Christou / Dinos Pavlou; Talat Rahimov / Farid Shirinov	6; 3	6; 1

== Relegation pool ==
The bottom two teams from Pools A and B were placed in the relegation group. Results and points from games against the opponent from the preliminary round were carried forward.

Team	Pld	W	L	MF	MA
Turkey	3	3	0	6	2
North Macedonia	3	2	1	6	3
Moldova	3	1	2	4	4
Bosnia and Herzegovina	3	0	3	1	8

Moldova and Bosnia/Herzegovina demoted to Group IV for 2004.

=== Turkey vs. North Macedonia ===
Turkey
2
State Tennis Centre, Jūrmala, Latvia
14 June 2003
Clay

North Macedonia
1

			1	2	3
1	(Turkey) (North Macedonia)	Esat Tanık; Predrag Rusevski	6; 3	2; 6	1; 6
2	(Turkey) (North Macedonia)	Haluk Akkoyun; Kristian Mitrovski	6; 3	6; 2
3	(Turkey) (North Macedonia)	Haluk Akkoyun / Esat Tanık; Predrag Rusevski / Zoran Ševčenko	6; 3	6; 4

=== Bosnia and Herzegovina vs. Moldova ===
Bosnia and Herzegovina
0
State Tennis Centre, Jūrmala, Latvia
14 June 2003
Clay

Moldova
3

			1	2	3
1	(Bosnia and Herzegovina) (Moldova)	Zlatan Kadrić; Andrei Ciumac	6; 2	5; 7	4; 6
2	(Bosnia and Herzegovina) (Moldova)	Igor Račić; Andrei Gorban	6^{10} 7^{12}	4; 6
3	(Bosnia and Herzegovina) (Moldova)	Ivan Dodig / Zlatan Kadrić; Sergei Cupțov / Andrei Gorban	3; 6	5; 7

=== Turkey vs. Moldova ===
Turkey
2
State Tennis Centre, Jūrmala, Latvia
15 June 2003
Clay

Moldova
0

			1	2	3
1	(Turkey) (Moldova)	Esat Tanık; Denys Molchanov	6; 1	2; 6	14; 12
2	(Turkey) (Moldova)	Haluk Akkoyun; Andrei Gorban	6; 4	3; 6	6; 3
3	(Turkey) (Moldova)	Haluk Akkoyun / Esat Tanık; Andrei Gorban / Denys Molchanov				not played

=== Bosnia and Herzegovina vs. North Macedonia ===
Bosnia and Herzegovina
0
State Tennis Centre, Jūrmala, Latvia
15 June 2003
Clay

North Macedonia
3

			1	2	3
1	(Bosnia and Herzegovina) (North Macedonia)	Ivan Dodig; Predrag Rusevski	5; 7	1; 6
2	(Bosnia and Herzegovina) (North Macedonia)	Zlatan Kadrić; Dimitar Grabul	4; 6	6^{3} 7^{7}
3	(Bosnia and Herzegovina) (North Macedonia)	Ivan Dodig / Zlatan Kadrić; Dimitar Grabul / Kristian Mitrovski	4; 6	4; 6

== Final standings ==
Rank	Team
1	Georgia
2	Latvia
3	Cyprus
4	Azerbaijan
5	Turkey
6	North Macedonia
7	Moldova
8	Bosnia and Herzegovina

- Georgia and Latvia promoted to Group II in 2004.
- Moldova and Bosnia and Herzegovina relegated to Group IV in 2004.

=== Group IV ===
==== Zone A ====
Venue: National Centre, Lagos, Nigeria (hard)
Date: 5–9 February

	Pool A	TOG	BUR	BOT	MLI	DJI
1	Togo (4–0)		3–0	3–0	3–0	3–0
2	Burkina Faso (3–1)	0–3		2–1	3–0	3–0
3	Botswana (2–2)	0–3	1–2		2–1	3–0
4	Mali (1–3)	0–3	0–3	1–2		3–0
5	Djibouti (0–4)	0–3	0–3	0–3	0–3	

	Pool B	BEN	NGA	GAB	SEN	UGA
1	Benin (4–0)		2–1	3–0	2–1	3–0
2	Nigeria (3–1)	1–2		3–0	3–0	3–0
3	Gabon (2–2)	0–3	0–3		2–1	3–0
4	Senegal (1–3)	1–2	0–3	1–2		3–0
5	Uganda (0–4)	0–3	0–3	0–3	0–3	

- Togo and Benin promoted to Group III in 2004.

The Europe/Africa Zone was one of the three zones of the regional Davis Cup competition in 2003.

In the Europe/Africa Zone there were four different tiers, called groups, in which teams competed against each other to advance to the upper tier. Group IV was split into two tournaments. One tournament was held in National Centre, Lagos, Nigeria, February 5–9, on outdoor hard courts, while the other was held in Centro Tennis di Fonte dell'Ovo, San Marino, June 11–15, on outdoor clay courts.

== Format ==
The ten teams in the Lagos tournament were split into two groups and played in a round-robin format. The winner of each group were promoted to the Europe/Africa Zone Group III in 2004.

== Pool A ==
	Pool A	TOG	BUR	BOT	MLI	DJI
1	Togo (4–0)		3–0	3–0	3–0	3–0
2	Burkina Faso (3–1)	0–3		2–1	3–0	3–0
3	Botswana (2–2)	0–3	1–2		2–1	3–0
4	Mali (1–3)	0–3	0–3	1–2		3–0
5	Djibouti (0–4)	0–3	0–3	0–3	0–3	

Togo promoted to Group III in 2004.

=== Botswana vs. Djibouti ===
Botswana
3
National Centre, Lagos, Nigeria
5 February 2003
Hard

Djibouti
0

			1	2	3
1	(Botswana) (Djibouti)	Keneilwe Phuthego; Abdou-Ali Abdullah	6; 0	6; 0
2	(Botswana) (Djibouti)	Thato Kgosimore; Kadar Mogueh	6; 0	6; 1
3	(Botswana) (Djibouti)	Phenyo Matong / Modisaotsile Phatshwane; Abdi-Fatah Abdourahman-Youssouf / Kadar Mogueh	6; 2	6; 1

=== Togo vs. Burkina Faso ===
Togo
3
National Centre, Lagos, Nigeria
5 February 2003
Hard

Burkina Faso
0

			1	2	3
1	(Togo) (Burkina Faso)	Jean-Kome Loglo; Mamadou Kaboré	6; 4	6; 0
2	(Togo) (Burkina Faso)	Komlavi Loglo; Sansan Dabiré	6; 3	3; 6	6; 3
3	(Togo) (Burkina Faso)	Kwami Gakpo / Jean-Kome Loglo; Mamadou Kaboré / Kadré Nanema	6; 4	6; 1

=== Togo vs. Djibouti ===
Togo
3
National Centre, Lagos, Nigeria
6 February 2003
Hard

Djibouti
0

			1	2	3
1	(Togo) (Djibouti)	Komlavi Loglo; Abdi-Fatah Abdourahman-Youssouf	6; 0	6; 0
2	(Togo) (Djibouti)	Kwami Gakpo; Abdou-Ali Abdullah	6; 0	6; 0
3	(Togo) (Djibouti)	Kwami Gakpo / Komlavi Loglo; Kadar Mogueh / Issa Willo-Ismaël	6; 0	6; 0

=== Mali vs. Burkina Faso ===
Mali
0
National Centre, Lagos, Nigeria
6 February 2003
Hard

Burkina Faso
3

			1	2	3
1	(Mali) (Burkina Faso)	Madou Keita; Kadré Nanema	5; 7	2; 6
2	(Mali) (Burkina Faso)	Amadou Diallo; Sansan Dabiré	2; 6	3; 6
3	(Mali) (Burkina Faso)	Amadou Diallo / Madou Keita; Sansan Dabiré / Mamadou Kaboré	4; 6	2; 6

=== Botswana vs. Burkina Faso ===
Botswana
1
National Centre, Lagos, Nigeria
7 February 2003
Hard

Burkina Faso
2

			1	2	3
1	(Botswana) (Burkina Faso)	Thato Kgosimore; Mamadou Kaboré	4; 6	6; 4	6; 3
2	(Botswana) (Burkina Faso)	Modisaotsile Phatshwane; Sansan Dabiré	4; 6	0; 6
3	(Botswana) (Burkina Faso)	Thato Kgosimore / Keneilwe Phuthego; Sansan Dabiré / Mamadou Kaboré	4; 6	6; 3	4; 6

=== Togo vs. Mali ===
Togo
3
National Centre, Lagos, Nigeria
7 February 2003
Hard

Mali
0

			1	2	3
1	(Togo) (Mali)	Jean-Kome Loglo; Madou Keita	6; 0	6; 0
2	(Togo) (Mali)	Komlavi Loglo; Yaya Traoré	6; 1	7; 5
3	(Togo) (Mali)	Kwami Gakpo / Jean-Kome Loglo; Amadou Diallo / Yaya Traoré	6; 0	6; 2

=== Botswana vs. Mali ===
Botswana
2
National Centre, Lagos, Nigeria
8 February 2003
Hard

Mali
1

			1	2	3
1	(Botswana) (Mali)	Keneilwe Phuthego; Yaya Traoré	6; 1	3; 6	6; 4
2	(Botswana) (Mali)	Thato Kgosimore; Amadou Diallo	6; 1	6; 2
3	(Botswana) (Mali)	Phenyo Matong / Modisaotsile Phatshwane; Amadou Diallo / Yaya Traoré	2; 6	5; 7

=== Burkina Faso vs. Djibouti ===
Burkina Faso
3
National Centre, Lagos, Nigeria
8 February 2003
Hard

Djibouti
0

			1	2	3
1	(Burkina Faso) (Djibouti)	Kadré Nanema; Issa Willo-Ismaël	6; 0	6; 0
2	(Burkina Faso) (Djibouti)	Mamadou Kaboré; Kadar Mogueh	6; 2	6; 0
3	(Burkina Faso) (Djibouti)	Mamadou Kaboré / Kadré Nanema; Abdou-Ali Abdullah / Issa Willo-Ismaël	6; 0	6; 0

=== Botswana vs. Togo ===
Botswana
0
National Centre, Lagos, Nigeria
9 February 2003
Hard

Togo
3

			1	2	3
1	(Botswana) (Togo)	Keneilwe Phuthego; Jean-Kome Loglo	4; 6	3; 6
2	(Botswana) (Togo)	Thato Kgosimore; Komlavi Loglo	4; 6	0; 6
3	(Botswana) (Togo)	Modisaotsile Phatshwane / Keneilwe Phuthego; Kwami Gakpo / Jean-Kome Loglo	4; 6	2; 6

=== Mali vs. Djibouti ===
Mali
3
National Centre, Lagos, Nigeria
9 February 2003
Hard

Djibouti
0

			1	2	3
1	(Mali) (Djibouti)	Madou Keita; Abdi-Fatah Abdourahman-Youssouf	6; 0	6; 1
2	(Mali) (Djibouti)	Amadou Diallo; Abdou-Ali Abdullah	6; 3	6; 0
3	(Mali) (Djibouti)	Madou Keita / Yaya Traoré; Abdou-Ali Abdullah / Abdi-Fatah Abdourahman-Youssouf	6; 0	6; 0

== Pool B ==
	Pool B	BEN	NGA	GAB	SEN	UGA
1	Benin (4–0)		2–1	3–0	2–1	3–0
2	Nigeria (3–1)	1–2		3–0	3–0	3–0
3	Gabon (2–2)	0–3	0–3		2–1	3–0
4	Senegal (1–3)	1–2	0–3	1–2		3–0
5	Uganda (0–4)	0–3	0–3	0–3	0–3	

Benin promoted to Group III in 2004.

=== Nigeria vs. Gabon ===
Nigeria
3
National Centre, Lagos, Nigeria
5 February 2003
Hard

Gabon
0

			1	2	3
1	(Nigeria) (Gabon)	Jonathan Igbinovia; Nguemah Oyone-Meye	6; 2	6; 2
2	(Nigeria) (Gabon)	Abdul-Mumin Babalola; Christophe Couprie	6; 1	6; 1
3	(Nigeria) (Gabon)	Abdul-Mumin Babalola / Jonathan Igbinovia; Kryce Didier Momo Kassa / Nguemah Oyone-Meye	6; 2	6; 2

=== Benin vs. Uganda ===
Benin
3
National Centre, Lagos, Nigeria
5 February 2003
Hard

Uganda
0

			1	2	3
1	(Benin) (Uganda)	Christophe Pognon; Patrick Olobo	6; 1	6; 1
2	(Benin) (Uganda)	Arnaud Segodo; Charles Yokwe	6; 4	6; 0
3	(Benin) (Uganda)	Arnaud Segodo / Rodrigue Vignikin; Patrick Ochan / Charles Yokwe	6; 1	5; 7	7; 5

=== Benin vs. Gabon ===
Benin
3
National Centre, Lagos, Nigeria
6 February 2003
Hard

Gabon
0

			1	2	3
1	(Benin) (Gabon)	Christophe Pognon; Nguemah Oyone-Meye	6; 2	6; 1
2	(Benin) (Gabon)	Arnaud Segodo; Christophe Couprie	6; 1	4; 3		retired
3	(Benin) (Gabon)	Arnaud Segodo / Rodrigue Vignikin; Yvan-Johan Mefane / Kryce Didier Momo Kassa	6; 3	6; 3

=== Senegal vs. Uganda ===
Senegal
3
National Centre, Lagos, Nigeria
6 February 2003
Hard

Uganda
0

			1	2	3
1	(Senegal) (Uganda)	Daouda Ndiaye; Ronald Semanda	6; 2	7; 5
2	(Senegal) (Uganda)	Diadji Ka; Patrick Ochan	6; 2	6; 2
3	(Senegal) (Uganda)	Diadji Ka / Daouda Ndiaye; Patrick Ochan / Charles Yokwe	6; 2	6; 2

=== Nigeria vs. Uganda ===
Nigeria
3
National Centre, Lagos, Nigeria
7 February 2003
Hard

Uganda
0

			1	2	3
1	(Nigeria) (Uganda)	Jonathan Igbinovia; Ronald Semanda	6; 1	6; 0
2	(Nigeria) (Uganda)	Sunday Jegede; Patrick Olobo	6; 4	4; 6	6; 1
3	(Nigeria) (Uganda)	Toyin Dairo / Jonathan Igbinovia; Patrick Ochan / Patrick Olobo	6; 1	6; 1

=== Benin vs. Senegal ===
Benin
2
National Centre, Lagos, Nigeria
7 February 2003
Hard

Senegal
1

			1	2	3
1	(Benin) (Senegal)	Christophe Pognon; Daouda Ndiaye	6; 3	6; 2
2	(Benin) (Senegal)	Arnaud Segodo; Diadji Ka	7; 5	6; 3
3	(Benin) (Senegal)	Arnaud Segodo / Rodrigue Vignikin; Diadji Ka / Daouda Ndiaye	6; 1	6^{7} 7^{9}	4; 6

=== Nigeria vs. Senegal ===
Nigeria
3
National Centre, Lagos, Nigeria
8 February 2003
Hard

Senegal
0

			1	2	3
1	(Nigeria) (Senegal)	Jonathan Igbinovia; Daouda Ndiaye	6; 3	7^{7} 6^{2}
2	(Nigeria) (Senegal)	Abdul-Mumin Babalola; Diadji Ka	6; 1	6; 3
3	(Nigeria) (Senegal)	Toyin Dairo / Jonathan Igbinovia; Diadji Ka / Daouda Ndiaye	6; 2	6; 3

=== Uganda vs. Gabon ===
Uganda
0
National Centre, Lagos, Nigeria
8 February 2003
Hard

Gabon
3

			1	2	3
1	(Uganda) (Gabon)	Patrick Olobo; Nguemah Oyone-Meye	6^{2} 7^{7}	3; 6
2	(Uganda) (Gabon)	Charles Yokwe; Christophe Couprie	0; 6	4; 6
3	(Uganda) (Gabon)	Patrick Olobo / Charles Yokwe; Christophe Couprie / Nguemah Oyone-Meye	3; 6	5; 7

=== Nigeria vs. Benin ===
Nigeria
1
National Centre, Lagos, Nigeria
9 February 2003
Hard

Benin
2

			1	2	3
1	(Nigeria) (Benin)	Jonathan Igbinovia; Christophe Pognon	6; 3	7^{7} 6^{5}
2	(Nigeria) (Benin)	Abdul-Mumin Babalola; Arnaud Segodo	3; 6	2; 6
3	(Nigeria) (Benin)	Toyin Dairo / Jonathan Igbinovia; Christophe Pognon / Arnaud Segodo	6; 3	6^{6} 7^{8}	5; 7

=== Senegal vs. Gabon ===
Senegal
1
National Centre, Lagos, Nigeria
9 February 2003
Hard

Gabon
2

			1	2	3
1	(Senegal) (Gabon)	Youssou Berthé; Nguemah Oyone-Meye	2; 6	6; 4	4; 6
2	(Senegal) (Gabon)	Diadji Ka; Christophe Couprie	7; 5	2; 6	1; 6
3	(Senegal) (Gabon)	Diadji Ka / Daouda Ndiaye; Yvan-Johan Mefane / Kryce Didier Momo Kassa	6; 2	6; 2

==== Zone B ====
- Venue: Centro Tennis di Fonte dell'Ovo, San Marino (outdoor clay)
- Date: 11–15 June

Rank	Team
1	Iceland
2	Kenya
3	San Marino
4	Rwanda
5	Malta
6	Zambia
7	Mauritius

- Iceland and Kenya promoted to Group III in 2004.
