= 2001 Davis Cup =

2001 edition of the Davis Cup

Details
- Duration: 9 February – 2 December 2001
- Edition: 90th
- Teams: 139

Champion
- Winning nation: France

The 2001 Davis Cup (also known as the 2001 Davis Cup by NEC for sponsorship purposes) was the 90th edition of the Davis Cup, the most important tournament between national teams in men's tennis. 139 teams entered the competition, 16 in the World Group, 29 in the Americas Zone, 32 in the Asia/Oceania Zone, and 62 in the Europe/Africa Zone. Angola, Burkina Faso, Gabon, Mali and Rwanda made their first appearances in the tournament.

France defeated Australia in the final, held at the Rod Laver Arena in Melbourne Park, Melbourne, Australia, on 30 November–2 December, to win their 9th title and their first since 1996. The French team achieved victory despite not playing a single match on home soil.

== World Group ==
Participating teams
Australia	Belgium	Brazil	Czech Republic
Ecuador	France	Germany	Morocco
Netherlands	Romania	Russia	Slovakia
Spain	Sweden	Switzerland	United States

=== Draw ===
First round 9–11 February
Perth, Australia (grass)
S	Australia	4
Ecuador	1
Rio de Janeiro, Brazil (clay)
S	Brazil	4
Morocco	1
Helsingborg, Sweden (indoor carpet)
S	Sweden	3
Czech Republic	2
Bratislava, Slovakia (indoor hard)
S	Russia	3
Slovakia	2
Ghent, Belgium (indoor clay)
Belgium	0
S	France	5
Basel, Switzerland (indoor hard)
Switzerland	3
S	United States	2
Braunschweig, Germany (indoor carpet)
Romania	2
S	Germany	3
Eindhoven, Netherlands (indoor carpet)
Netherlands	4
S	Spain	1

Quarterfinals; 6–8 April
Florianópolis, Brazil (clay)
S	Australia	3
S	Brazil	1
Malmö, Sweden (indoor hard)
S	Sweden	4
S	Russia	1
Neuchâtel, Switzerland (indoor carpet)
S	France	3
Switzerland	2
's-Hertogenbosch, Netherlands (indoor carpet)
S	Germany	1
Netherlands	4

Semifinals; 21–23 September
Sydney, Australia (hard)
S	Australia	4
S	Sweden	1
Rotterdam, Netherlands (indoor carpet)
S	France	3
Netherlands	2

Final; 30 November–2 December
Melbourne, Australia (grass)
S	Australia	2
S	France	3

=== Final ===
Australia vs. France

Australia
2
Rod Laver Arena, Melbourne Park, Melbourne, Australia
30 November–2 December 2001
Grass

France
3

			1	2	3	4	5
1	(Australia) (France)	Lleyton Hewitt; Nicolas Escudé	6; 4	3; 6	6; 3	3; 6	4; 6
2	(Australia) (France)	Pat Rafter; Sébastien Grosjean	6; 3	7^{8} 6^{6}	7; 5
3	(Australia) (France)	Lleyton Hewitt / Pat Rafter; Cédric Pioline / Fabrice Santoro	6; 2	3; 6	6^{5} 7^{7}	1; 6
4	(Australia) (France)	Lleyton Hewitt; Sébastien Grosjean	6; 3	6; 2	6; 3
5	(Australia) (France)	Wayne Arthurs; Nicolas Escudé	6^{3} 7^{7}	7^{7} 6^{5}	3; 6	3; 6

== World Group qualifying round ==
Date: 21–23 September; 12–14 October

The eight losing teams in the World Group first round ties and eight winners of the Zonal Group I final round ties competed in the World Group qualifying round for spots in the 2002 World Group.

Home team	Score	Visiting team	Location	Venue	Door	Surface
Argentina	5–0	Belarus	Córdoba	Córdoba Lawn Tennis Club	Outdoor	Clay
Belgium	2–3	Morocco	Liège	Country Hall Liège	Indoor	Carpet
Czech Republic	3–2	Romania	Prostějov	Sports Hall	Indoor	Carpet
Ecuador	1–4	Great Britain	Guayaquil	Club Nacional	Outdoor	Clay
Italy	2–3	Croatia	Rome	Foro Italico	Outdoor	Clay
Slovakia	3–2	Chile	Prešov	Mestská hala	Indoor	Carpet
Spain	4–0	Uzbekistan	Albacete	Tennis Club de Albacete	Outdoor	Clay
United States	4–1	India	Winston-Salem, NC	Lawrence Joel Colisseum	Indoor	Hard

- Czech Republic, Morocco, Slovakia, Spain and United States remain in the World Group in 2002.
- Argentina, Croatia and Great Britain are promoted to the World Group in 2002.
- Belarus, Chile, Italy, India and Uzbekistan remain in Zonal Group I in 2002.
- Belgium, Ecuador and Romania are relegated to Zonal Group I in 2002.

== Americas Zone ==
=== Group I ===
Second round play-offs 21–23 September
Atizapán de Zaragoza, MX (indoor carpet)
Mexico	3
Peru	2

First round play-offs 20–22 July
Mexico City, Mexico (clay)
Canada	3
Mexico	2
Peru
bye

First round 9–11 February
Canada
bye
Mendoza, Argentina (clay)
Mexico	0
Argentina	5
Nassau, Bahamas (hard)
Bahamas	3
Peru	2
bye
Chile

Second round 6–8 April
Córdoba, Argentina (clay)
Canada	0
Argentina	5
Nassau, Bahamas (hard)
Bahamas	1
Chile	4

- Peru relegated to Group II in 2002.
- Argentina and Chile advance to World Group qualifying round.

=== Group II ===
Relegation Play-offs
Bogotá, Colombia (clay)
Colombia	5
Costa Rica	0
Asunción, Paraguay (clay)
Dominican Republic	2
Paraguay	3

First Round
Montevideo, Uruguay (clay)
Colombia	1
Uruguay	3
San Rafael de Escazú, Costa Rica (hard)
Costa Rica	2
Netherlands Antilles	3
Guatemala City, Guatemala (hard)
Dominican Republic	2
Guatemala	3
Asunción, Paraguay (clay)
Paraguay	2
Venezuela	3

Second Round
Montevideo, Uruguay (clay)
Uruguay	5
Netherlands Antilles	0
Guatemala City, Guatemala (hard)
Guatemala	0
Venezuela	5

Third Round
Montevideo, Uruguay (clay)
Uruguay	2
Venezuela	3

- Costa Rica and Dominican Republic relegated to Group III in 2002.
- Venezuela promoted to Group I in 2002.

=== Group III ===
- Venue: Cuba
- Date: 14–18 March

Group A

	TRI	ESA	HON	PUR	RR; W–L	Match; W–L	Set; W–L	Standings
Trinidad and Tobago		2–1	2–1	0–3	2–1	4–5 (44%)	18–15 (55%)	1
El Salvador	1–2		2–1	2–1	2–1	5–4 (56%)	17–17 (50%)	2
Honduras	1–2	1–2		2–1	1–2	4–5 (44%)	13–19 (41%)	4
Puerto Rico	3–0	1–2	1–2		1–2	5–4 (56%)	22–19 (54%)	3

Group B

	CUB	JAM	BOL	BER	RR; W–L	Match; W–L	Set; W–L	Standings
Cuba		2–1	3–0	3–0	3–0	8–1 (89%)	25–6 (81%)	1
Jamaica	1–2		3–0	3–0	2–1	7–2 (78%)	22–11 (67%)	2
Bolivia	0–3	0–3		2–1	1–2	2–7 (22%)	8–23 (26%)	3
Bermuda	0–3	0–3	1–2		0–3	1–8 (11%)	10–25 (29%)	4

1st to 4th place play-offs

3rd-4th Play-off
B2	Jamaica	2
A2	El Salvador	1

Semifinals
A1	Trinidad and Tobago	3
B2	Jamaica	0
A2	El Salvador	1
B1	Cuba	2

Final
A1	Trinidad and Tobago	0
B1	Cuba	2

5th to 8th place play-offs

7th-8th Play-off
A3	Honduras	2
A4	Puerto Rico	0

5th-8th Play-offs
A3	Honduras	3
B4	Bermuda	0
A4	Puerto Rico	2
B3	Bolivia	1

5th-6th Play-off
B4	Bermuda	0
B3	Bolivia	2

=== Final standings ===
Rank	Team
1	Cuba
2	Trinidad and Tobago
3	Jamaica
4	El Salvador
5	Honduras
6	Puerto Rico
7	Bolivia
8	Bermuda

- Cuba and Trinidad and Tobago promoted to Group II in 2002.
- Bolivia and Bermuda relegated to Group IV in 2002.

=== Group IV ===
- Venue: Cercle Bellevue, Port-au-Prince, Haiti
- Date: 5–11 March

	HAI	PAN	ECA	LCA	BAR	ISV	ATG	RR; W–L	Match; W–L	Set; W–L	Standings
Haiti		2–1	3–0	3–0	3–0	2–1	3–0	6–0	16–2 (89%)	50–8 (86%)	1
Panama	1–2		3–0	3–0	3–0	3–0	3–0	5–1	16–2 (89%)	49–10 (83%)	2
Eastern Caribbean	0–3	0–3		2–1	2–1	1–2	2–1	3–3	7–11 (39%)	28–41 (41%)	3
Saint Lucia	0–3	0–3	1–2		2–1	2–1	1–2	2–4	6–12 (33%)	22–39 (36%)	5
Barbados	0–3	0–3	1–2	1–2		2–1	2–1	2–4	6–12 (33%)	26–37 (41%)	4
U.S. Virgin Islands	1–2	0–3	2–1	1–2	1–2		3–0	2–4	8–10 (44%)	26–41 (39%)	6
Antigua and Barbuda	0–3	0–3	1–2	2–1	1–2	0–3		1–5	4–14 (22%)	20–45 (31%)	7

- Haiti and Panama promoted to Group III in 2001.

== Asia/Oceania Zone ==
=== Group I ===
Second Round Play-offs
Jakarta, Indonesia (hard)
Indonesia	4
China	1

First Round Play-offs
Seoul, South Korea (hard)
Indonesia	1
South Korea	4
Nonthaburi, Thailand (hard)
Thailand	5
China	0

First Round
Jakarta, Indonesia (hard)
Uzbekistan	3
Indonesia	2
Seoul, South Korea (indoor carpet)
South Korea	2
New Zealand	3
Tokyo, Japan (indoor hard)
Thailand	1
Japan	4
Langfang, China (indoor hard)
China	2
India	3

Second Round
Invercargill, NZ (indoor carpet)
Uzbekistan	3
New Zealand	2
Tokyo, Japan (indoor hard)
Japan	2
India	3

- China relegated to Group II in 2002.
- Uzbekistan and India advance to World Group qualifying round.

=== Group II ===
Relegation Play-offs
Mishref, Kuwait (hard)
Kuwait	4
Iran	1
Damascus, Syria (indoor hard)
Syria	0
Pakistan	5

First Round
Kuwait City, Kuwait (hard)
Lebanon	4
Kuwait	1
Causeway Bay, Hong Kong (hard)
Iran	1
Hong Kong	4
Damascus, Syria (indoor hard)
Syria	2
Malaysia	3
Taichung, Taiwan (clay)
Pakistan	2
Chinese Taipei	3

Second Round
Yarze, Lebanon (clay)
Lebanon	3
Hong Kong	2
Kuala Lumpur, Malaysia (indoor hard)
Malaysia	0
Chinese Taipei	5

Third Round
Yarze, Lebanon (clay)
Lebanon	w/o
Chinese Taipei

- Iran and Syria relegated to Group III in 2002.
- Lebanon promoted to Group I in 2002.

=== Group III ===
- Venue: Rizal Memorial Sports Complex, Manila, Philippines
- Date: 7–11 February

Group A

	PHI	SIN	SRI	BHR	RR; W–L	Match; W–L	Set; W–L	Standings
Philippines		3–0	3–0	3–0	3–0	9–0 (100%)	27–1 (96%)	1
Singapore	0–3		2–1	3–0	2–1	5–4 (56%)	16–13 (55%)	2
Sri Lanka	0–3	1–2		2–1	1–2	3–6 (33%)	10–21 (32%)	3
Bahrain	0–3	0–3	1–2		0–3	1–8 (11%)	6–24 (20%)	4

Group B

	KAZ	TJK	KSA	QAT	RR; W–L	Match; W–L	Set; W–L	Standings
Kazakhstan		3–0	3–0	3–0	3–0	9–0 (100%)	27–4 (87%)	1
Tajikistan	0–3		2–1	2–1	2–1	4–5 (44%)	14–18 (44%)	2
Saudi Arabia	0–3	1–2		2–1	1–2	3–6 (33%)	13–21 (38%)	3
Qatar	0–3	1–2	1–2		0–3	2–7 (22%)	10–21 (32%)	4

1st to 4th place play-offs

3rd-4th Play-off
B2	Tajikistan	2
B2	Singapore	1

Semifinals
A1	Philippines	2
B2	Tajikistan	1
A2	Singapore	0
B1	Kazakhstan	2

Final
A1	Philippines	0
B1	Kazakhstan	2

5th to 8th place play-offs

7th-8th Play-off
A3	Sri Lanka	2
A4	Bahrain	0

5th-8th Play-offs
A3	Sri Lanka	1
B4	Qatar	2
A4	Bahrain	0
B3	Saudi Arabia	2

5th-6th Play-off
A3	Qatar	2
B3	Saudi Arabia	1

=== Final standings ===
Rank	Team
1	Kazakhstan
2	Philippines
3	Tajikistan
4	Singapore
5	Saudi Arabia
6	Qatar
7	Sri Lanka
8	Bahrain

- Kazakhstan and Philippines promoted to Group II in 2002.
- Sri Lanka and Bahrain relegated to Group IV in 2002.

=== Group IV ===
- Venue: Abu Dhabi Airport Golf and Tennis Club, Abu Dhabi, United Arab Emirates
- Date: 25–29 April

Group A

	IRQ	OMA	BAN	FIJ	RR; W–L	Match; W–L	Set; W–L	Standings
Iraq		2–1	3–0	3–0	3–0	8–1 (89%)	17–4 (81%)	1
Oman	1–2		1–2	3–0	1–2	5–4 (56%)	12–12 (50%)	2
Bangladesh	0–3	2–1		1–2	1–2	3–6 (33%)	7–14 (33%)	3
Fiji	0–3	0–3	2–1		1–2	2–7 (22%)	9–15 (38%)	4

Group B

	UAE	POC	JOR	BRU	RR; W–L	Match; W–L	Set; W–L	Standings
United Arab Emirates		2–1	2–1	3–0	3–0	7–2 (78%)	14–6 (70%)	1
Pacific Oceania	1–2		2–1	3–0	2–1	6–3 (67%)	14–7 (67%)	2
Jordan	1–2	1–2		3–0	1–2	5–4 (56%)	12–9 (57%)	3
Brunei	0–3	0–3	0–3		0–3	0–9 (0%)	0–18 (0%)	4

1st to 4th place play-offs

3rd-4th Play-off
A1	Iraq	3
A2	Oman	0

Semifinals
A1	Iraq	1
B2	Pacific Oceania	2
A2	Oman	1
B1	United Arab Emirates	2

Final
B2	Pacific Oceania	1
B1	United Arab Emirates	2

5th to 8th place play-offs

7th-8th Play-off
A3	Bangladesh	1
A4	Fiji	2

5th-8th Play-offs
A3	Bangladesh	1
B4	Brunei	2
A4	Fiji	1
B3	Jordan	2

5th-6th Play-off
B4	Brunei	0
B3	Jordan	3

=== Final standings ===
Rank	Team
1	United Arab Emirates
2	Pacific Oceania
3	Iraq
4	Oman
5	Jordan
6	Brunei
7	Fiji
8	Bangladesh

- United Arab Emirates and Pacific Oceania promoted to Group III in 2002.

== Europe/Africa Zone ==
=== Group I ===
Second Round Play-offs
Wels, Austria (indoor hard)
Ukraine	1
Austria	4
Harare, Zimbabwe (indoor hard)
Zimbabwe	3
Slovenia	2

First Round Play-offs
bye
Ukraine
Austria
bye
bye
Zimbabwe
Slovenia
bye

First Round
Great Britain
bye
Maia, Portugal (clay)
Ukraine	2
Portugal	3
Austria
bye
bye
Croatia
Belarus
bye
bye
Zimbabwe
Helsinki, Finland (indoor carpet)
Slovenia	2
Finland	3
bye
Italy

Second Round
Solihull, England (indoor carpet)
Great Britain	5
Portugal	0
Pula, Croatia (indoor carpet)
Austria	1
Croatia	4
Minsk, Belarus (indoor carpet)
Belarus	3
Zimbabwe	2
Helsinki, Finland (indoor carpet)
Finland	2
Italy	3

- Ukraine and Slovenia relegated to Group II in 2002.
- Great Britain, Croatia, Belarus, and Italy advance to World Group qualifying round.

=== Group II ===
Relegation Play-offs
Roquebrune-Cap-Martin, France (clay)
Monaco	1
Ireland	4
Chișinău, Moldova (clay)
Turkey	2
Moldova	3
Abidjan, Ivory Coast (hard)
Estonia	2
Ivory Coast	3
Belgrade, Yugoslavia (clay)
Poland	2
Yugoslavia	3

First Round
Szeged, Hungary (clay)
Hungary	5
Monaco	0
Dublin, Ireland (indoor carpet)
Ireland	2
Denmark	3
Istanbul, Turkey (hard)
Greece	5
Turkey	0
Chișinău, Moldova (indoor carpet)
Armenia	3
Moldova	2
Tallinn, Estonia (indoor carpet)
Norway	3
Estonia	2
Esch-sur-Alzette, Lux. (indoor carpet)
Luxembourg	3
Ivory Coast	2
Bytom, Poland (clay)
Poland	2
Israel	3
Nelspruit, South Africa (hard)
Yugoslavia	0
South Africa	5

Second Round
Skagen, Denmark (hard)
Hungary	2
Denmark	3
Athens, Greece (clay)
Greece	5
Armenia	0
Mondorf-les-Bains, Luxembourg (clay)
Norway	2
Luxembourg	3
Ramat HaSharon, Israel (hard)
Israel	3
South Africa	2

Third Round
Athens, Greece (clay)
Denmark	2
Greece	3
Mondorf-les-Bains, Luxembourg (clay)
Luxembourg	1
Israel	4

- Monaco, Turkey, Estonia, and Poland relegated to Group III in 2002.
- Greece and Israel promoted to Group I in 2002.

=== Group III ===
==== Zone A ====
- Venue: National Centre, Gaborone, Botswana
- Date: 16–20 May

Rank	Team
1	Latvia
2	Ghana
3	Lithuania
4	Madagascar
5	Botswana
6	Iceland
7	Georgia
8	Kenya

- Latvia and Ghana promoted to Group II in 2002.
- Georgia and Kenya relegated to Group IV in 2002.

==== Zone B ====
- Venue: Rose Hill Club, Beau Bassin-Rose Hill, Mauritius
- Date: 23–27 May

Rank	Team
1	Bulgaria
2	Egypt
3	Bosnia and Herzegovina
4	Macedonia
5	Mauritius
6	Namibia
7	Togo

- Bulgaria and Egypt promoted to Group II in 2002.
- Togo relegated to Group IV in 2002.

=== Group IV – Zone A ===
- Venue: Nicosia Tennis Club, Nicosia, Cyprus
- Date: 16–20 May

Group A

	CYP	ALG	BEN	RWA	LES	SUD	RR; W–L	Match; W–L	Set; W–L	Standings
Cyprus		3–0	2–1	3–0	3–0	3–0	5–0	14–1 (93%)	43–13 (77%)	1
Algeria	0–3		3–0	2–1	3–0	3–0	4–1	11–4 (73%)	40–16 (71%)	2
Benin	1–2	0–3		3–0	2–1	3–0	3–2	9–6 (60%)	32–20 (62%)	3
Rwanda	0–3	1–2	0–3		2–1	2–1	2–3	5–10 (33%)	18–33 (35%)	4
Lesotho	0–3	0–3	1–2	1–2		3–0	1–4	5–10 (33%)	17–32 (35%)	5
Sudan	0–3	0–3	0–3	1–2	0–3		0–5	1–14 (7%)	6–42 (13%)	6

Group B

	TUN	AZE	SMR	BUR	GAB	UGA	RR; W–L	Match; W–L	Set; W–L	Standings
Tunisia		2–1	2–1	3–0	3–0	3–0	5–0	13–2 (87%)	44–13 (77%)	1
Azerbaijan	1–2		2–1	2–1	2–1	3–0	4–1	10–5 (67%)	36–24 (60%)	2
San Marino	1–2	1–2		2–1	3–0	3–0	3–2	10–5 (67%)	37–21 (64%)	3
Burkina Faso	0–3	1–2	1–2		3–0	2–1	2–3	7–8 (47%)	25–29 (46%)	4
Gabon	0–3	1–2	0–3	0–3		3–0	1–4	4–11 (27%)	16–37 (30%)	5
Uganda	0–3	0–3	0–3	1–2	0–3		0–5	1–14 (7%)	9–43 (17%)	6

- Cyprus and Tunisia promoted to Group III in 2002.

=== Group IV – Zone B ===
- Venue: Marsa Sports Club, Marsa, Malta
- Date: 9–13 May

Group A

	AND	ANG	MLT	ETH	LBA	RR; W–L	Match; W–L	Set; W–L	Standings
Andorra		2–1	2–1	3–0	2–0	4–0	9–2 (82%)	19–4 (83%)	1
Angola	1–2		2–0	2–0	3–0	3–1	8–2 (80%)	16–6 (73%)	2
Malta	1–2	0–2		3–0	3–0	2–2	7–4 (64%)	14–10 (58%)	3
Ethiopia	0–3	0–2	0–3		2–0	1–3	2–8 (20%)	5–15 (25%)	4
Libya	0–2	0–3	0–3	0–2		0–4	0–10 (0%)	1–20 (5%)	5

Group B

	ZAM	MLI	SEN	DJI	RR; W–L	Match; W–L	Set; W–L	Standings
Zambia		2–1	2–1	3–0	3–0	7–2 (78%)	15–5 (75%)	1
Mali	1–2		3–0	3–0	2–1	7–2 (78%)	15–4 (79%)	2
Senegal	1–2	0–3		3–0	1–2	4–5 (44%)	8–11 (42%)	3
Djibouti	0–3	0–3	0–3		0–3	0–9 (0%)	0–18 (0%)	4

- Andorra and Zambia promoted to Group III in 2002.
