= 1997 Davis Cup Europe/Africa Zone Group III – Zone A =

International tennis competition

The Europe/Africa Zone was one of the three zones of the regional Davis Cup competition in 1997.

In the Europe/Africa Zone there were four different tiers, called groups, in which teams competed against each other to advance to the upper tier. The top two teams in Group III advanced to the Europe/Africa Zone Group II in 1998, whereas the bottom two teams were relegated to the Europe/Africa Zone Group IV in 1998.

== Participating nations ==
- Armenia
- Bosnia and Herzegovina
- Ethiopia
- Luxembourg
- Macedonia
- San Marino
- Senegal
- Turkey

=== Draw ===
- Venue: Dakar Olympic Club, Dakar, Senegal
- Date: 22–26 January

Group A

	MKD	TUR	SMR	ETH	RR; W–L	Match; W–L	Set; W–L	Standings
Macedonia		2–1	3–0	2–1	3–0	7–2 (78%)	15–5 (75%)	1
Turkey	1–2		3–0	3–0	2–1	7–2 (78%)	14–5 (74%)	2
San Marino	0–3	0–3		2–1	1–2	2–7 (22%)	5–14 (26%)	3
Ethiopia	1–2	0–3	1–2		0–3	2–7 (22%)	5–15 (25%)	4

Group B

	SEN	LUX	BIH	ARM	RR; W–L	Match; W–L	Set; W–L	Standings
Senegal		2–1	3–0	3–0	3–0	8–1 (89%)	16–3 (84%)	1
Luxembourg	1–2		2–1	3–0	2–1	6–3 (67%)	13–7 (65%)	2
Bosnia and Herzegovina	0–3	1–2		3–0	1–2	4–5 (44%)	9–10 (47%)	3
Armenia	0–3	0–3	0–3		0–3	0–9 (0%)	0–18 (0%)	4

1st to 4th place play-offs

3rd-4th play-off
A2	Turkey	2
A1	Macedonia	1

Semifinals
B1	Senegal	2
A2	Turkey	1
A1	Macedonia	1
B2	Luxembourg	2

Final
B1	Senegal	1
B2	Luxembourg	2

5th to 8th place play-offs

7th-8th play-off
B4	Armenia	2
A4	Ethiopia	1

5th-8th play-offs
A3	San Marino	3
B4	Armenia	0
B3	Bosnia and Herzegovina	3
A4	Ethiopia	0

5th-6th play-off
A3	San Marino	0
B3	Bosnia and Herzegovina	3

=== Final standings ===
Rank	Team
1	Luxembourg
2	Senegal
3	Turkey
4	Macedonia
5	Bosnia and Herzegovina
6	San Marino
7	Armenia
8	Ethiopia

- Luxembourg and Senegal promoted to Group II in 1998.
- Armenia and Ethiopia relegated to Group IV in 1998.

== Round robin ==
=== Group A ===
==== Ethiopia vs. Turkey ====
Ethiopia
0
Dakar Olympic Club, Dakar, Senegal
22 January 1997

Turkey
3

			1	2	3
1	(Ethiopia) (Turkey)	Habtamu Gebrekidan; Barış Ergün	0; 6	7^{7} 6^{5}	3; 6
2	(Ethiopia) (Turkey)	Yohannes Setegnwandimu; Erhan Oral	2; 6	3; 6
3	(Ethiopia) (Turkey)	Yohannes Setegnwandimu / Samuel Woldegebriel; Mustafa Azkara / Alaaddin Karagöz	0; 6	3; 6

==== Macedonia vs. San Marino ====
Macedonia
3
Dakar Olympic Club, Dakar, Senegal
22 January 1997

San Marino
0

			1	2	3
1	(North Macedonia) (San Marino)	Dragan Jovanovski; Christian Rosti	6; 1	2; 6	6; 3
2	(North Macedonia) (San Marino)	Zoran Ševčenko; Domenico Vicini	6; 1	6; 3
3	(North Macedonia) (San Marino)	Lazar Magdinčev / Zoran Ševčenko; Gabriel Francini / Domenico Vicini	6; 1	7^{7} 6^{5}

==== Ethiopia vs. Macedonia ====
Ethiopia
1
Dakar Olympic Club, Dakar, Senegal
23 January 1997

Macedonia
2

			1	2	3
1	(Ethiopia) (North Macedonia)	Samuel Woldegebriel; Dragan Jovanovski	2; 6	6; 4	6; 0
2	(Ethiopia) (North Macedonia)	Yohannes Setegnwandimu; Zoran Ševčenko	0; 6	0; 6
3	(Ethiopia) (North Macedonia)	Samuel Woldegebriel / Habtamu Gebrekidan; Lazar Magdinčev / Zoran Ševčenko	2; 6	1; 6

==== San Marino vs. Turkey ====
San Marino
0
Dakar Olympic Club, Dakar, Senegal
23 January 1997

Turkey
3

			1	2	3
1	(San Marino) (Turkey)	Christian Rosti; Barış Ergün	4; 6	2; 6
2	(San Marino) (Turkey)	Domenico Vicini; Erhan Oral	1; 6	4; 6
3	(San Marino) (Turkey)	Gabriel Francini / Domenico Vicini; Mustafa Azkara / Alaaddin Karagöz	3; 6	3; 6

==== Ethiopia vs. San Marino ====
Ethiopia
1
Dakar Olympic Club, Dakar, Senegal
24 January 1997

San Marino
2

			1	2	3
1	(Ethiopia) (San Marino)	Habtamu Gebrekidan; Christian Rosti	4; 6	1; 6
2	(Ethiopia) (San Marino)	Samuel Woldegebriel; Domenico Vicini	2; 6	4; 6
3	(Ethiopia) (San Marino)	Habtamu Gebrekidan / Yohannes Setegnwandimu; Gabriel Francini / Massimiliano Rosti	6; 3	7^{7} 6^{4}

==== Macedonia vs. Turkey ====
Macedonia
2
Dakar Olympic Club, Dakar, Senegal
24 January 1997

Turkey
1

			1	2	3
1	(North Macedonia) (Turkey)	Lazar Magdinčev; Alaaddin Karagöz	4; 6	4; 6
2	(North Macedonia) (Turkey)	Zoran Ševčenko; Barış Ergün	6; 4	6; 0
3	(North Macedonia) (Turkey)	Lazar Magdinčev / Zoran Ševčenko; Mustafa Azkara / Erhan Oral	7; 5	6; 2

=== Group B ===
==== Senegal vs. Armenia ====
Senegal
3
Dakar Olympic Club, Dakar, Senegal
22 January 1997

Armenia
0

			1	2	3
1	(Senegal) (Armenia)	Jean-Noël Said; Artek Aroutiounyan	6; 3	6; 4
2	(Senegal) (Armenia)	Yahiya Doumbia; Davit Babayan	6; 0	6; 0
3	(Senegal) (Armenia)	Yahiya Doumbia / Thierno Ly; Artek Aroutiounyan / Hayk Hakobyan	6; 2	6; 3

==== Bosnia and Herzegovina vs. Luxembourg ====
Bosnia and Herzegovina
1
Dakar Olympic Club, Dakar, Senegal
22 January 1997

Luxembourg
2

			1	2	3
1	(Bosnia and Herzegovina) (Luxembourg)	Eldar Mustafić; Johny Goudenbour	3; 6	3; 6
2	(Bosnia and Herzegovina) (Luxembourg)	Meride Zahirović; Sacha Thoma	7^{13} 6^{11}	6; 1
3	(Bosnia and Herzegovina) (Luxembourg)	Eldar Mustafić / Meride Zahirović; Johny Goudenbour / Pascal Schaul	6; 4	3; 6	4; 6

==== Senegal vs. Bosnia and Herzegovina ====
Senegal
3
Dakar Olympic Club, Dakar, Senegal
23 January 1997

Bosnia and Herzegovina
0

			1	2	3
1	(Senegal) (Bosnia and Herzegovina)	Jean-Noël Said; Haris Bašalić	7^{7} 6^{4}	6; 3
2	(Senegal) (Bosnia and Herzegovina)	Yahiya Doumbia; Meride Zahirović	6; 1	6; 2
3	(Senegal) (Bosnia and Herzegovina)	Yahiya Doumbia / Thierno Ly; Haris Bašalić / Eldar Mustafić	6; 3	6; 4

==== Armenia vs. Luxembourg ====
Armenia
0
Dakar Olympic Club, Dakar, Senegal
23 January 1997

Luxembourg
3

			1	2	3
1	(Armenia) (Luxembourg)	Artek Aroutiounyan; Adrian Graimprey	0; 6	0; 6
2	(Armenia) (Luxembourg)	Davit Babayan; Sacha Thoma	1; 6	1; 6
3	(Armenia) (Luxembourg)	Artek Aroutiounyan / Anri Makichyan; Johny Goudenbour / Pascal Schaul	2; 6	3; 6

==== Senegal vs. Luxembourg ====
Senegal
2
Dakar Olympic Club, Dakar, Senegal
24 January 1997

Luxembourg
1

			1	2	3
1	(Senegal) (Luxembourg)	Jean-Noël Said; Pascal Schaul	4; 6	4; 6
2	(Senegal) (Luxembourg)	Yahiya Doumbia; Adrian Graimprey	5; 7	6; 4	6; 2
3	(Senegal) (Luxembourg)	Yahiya Doumbia / Thierno Ly; Johny Goudenbour / Sacha Thoma	7^{9} 6^{7}	6; 2

==== Armenia vs. Bosnia and Herzegovina ====
Armenia
0
Dakar Olympic Club, Dakar, Senegal
24 January 1997

Bosnia and Herzegovina
3

			1	2	3
1	(Armenia) (Bosnia and Herzegovina)	Artek Aroutiounyan; Eldar Mustafić	3; 6	3; 6
2	(Armenia) (Bosnia and Herzegovina)	Davit Babayan; Meride Zahirović	2; 6	1; 6
3	(Armenia) (Bosnia and Herzegovina)	Hayk Hakobyan / Anri Makichyan; Eldar Mustafić / Meride Zahirović	4; 6	2; 6

== 1st to 4th place play-offs ==
=== Semifinals ===
==== Senegal vs. Turkey ====
Senegal
2
Dakar Olympic Club, Dakar, Senegal
25 January 1997

Turkey
1

			1	2	3
1	(Senegal) (Turkey)	Jean-Noël Said; Barış Ergün	6; 4	3; 6	3; 6
2	(Senegal) (Turkey)	Yahiya Doumbia; Erhan Oral	6; 2	6; 3
3	(Senegal) (Turkey)	Yahiya Doumbia / Thierno Ly; Barış Ergün / Alaaddin Karagöz	6; 4	6; 4

==== Macedonia vs. Luxembourg ====
Macedonia
1
Dakar Olympic Club, Dakar, Senegal
25 January 1997

Luxembourg
2

			1	2	3
1	(North Macedonia) (Luxembourg)	Lazar Magdinčev; Johny Goudenbour	2; 6	3; 6
2	(North Macedonia) (Luxembourg)	Zoran Ševčenko; Sacha Thoma	6; 1	6; 4
3	(North Macedonia) (Luxembourg)	Lazar Magdinčev / Zoran Ševčenko; Johny Goudenbour / Adrian Graimprey	6^{3} 7^{7}	7^{7} 6^{3}	2; 6

=== Final ===
==== Senegal vs. Luxembourg ====
Senegal
1
Dakar Olympic Club, Dakar, Senegal
26 January 1997

Luxembourg
2

			1	2	3
1	(Senegal) (Luxembourg)	Jean-Noël Said; Pascal Schaul	2; 6	4; 6
2	(Senegal) (Luxembourg)	Yahiya Doumbia; Sacha Thoma	6; 2	6; 2
3	(Senegal) (Luxembourg)	Yahiya Doumbia / Thierno Ly; Johny Goudenbour / Adrian Graimprey	6^{4} 7^{7}	6^{5} 7^{7}

=== 3rd to 4th play-off ===
==== Turkey vs. Macedonia ====
Turkey
2
Dakar Olympic Club, Dakar, Senegal
26 January 1997

Macedonia
1

			1	2	3
1	(Turkey) (North Macedonia)	Mustafa Azkara; Goran Popov	6; 4	6; 1
2	(Turkey) (North Macedonia)	Barış Ergün; Zoran Ševčenko	7^{7} 6^{4}	2; 6	6; 8
3	(Turkey) (North Macedonia)	Mustafa Azkara / Erhan Oral; Lazar Magdinčev / Zoran Ševčenko	6; 4	6; 2

== 5th to 8th place play-offs ==
=== 5th to 8th play-offs ===
==== San Marino vs. Armenia ====
San Marino
3
Dakar Olympic Club, Dakar, Senegal
25 January 1997

Armenia
0

			1	2	3
1	(San Marino) (Armenia)	Christian Rosti; Anri Makichyan	6; 1	6; 2
2	(San Marino) (Armenia)	Domenico Vicini; Artek Aroutiounyan	5; 7	7; 5	6; 3
3	(San Marino) (Armenia)	Gabriel Francini / Christian Rosti; Hayk Hakobyan / Anri Makichyan	6; 4	6; 2

==== Bosnia and Herzegovina vs. Ethiopia ====
Bosnia and Herzegovina
3
Dakar Olympic Club, Dakar, Senegal
25 January 1997

Ethiopia
0

			1	2	3
1	(Bosnia and Herzegovina) (Ethiopia)	Eldar Mustafić; Samuel Woldegebriel	6; 1	6; 2
2	(Bosnia and Herzegovina) (Ethiopia)	Meride Zahirović; Yohannes Setegnwandimu	2; 6	6; 3	6; 1
3	(Bosnia and Herzegovina) (Ethiopia)	Haris Bašalić / Eldar Mustafić; Habtamu Gebrekidan / Yohannes Setegnwandimu	6; 0	6; 0

=== 5th to 6th play-off ===
==== San Marino vs. Bosnia and Herzegovina ====
San Marino
0
Dakar Olympic Club, Dakar, Senegal
26 January 1997

Bosnia and Herzegovina
3

			1	2	3
1	(San Marino) (Bosnia and Herzegovina)	Christian Rosti; Eldar Mustafić	5; 7	5; 7
2	(San Marino) (Bosnia and Herzegovina)	Domenico Vicini; Meride Zahirović	6^{3} 7^{7}	6^{5} 7^{7}
3	(San Marino) (Bosnia and Herzegovina)	Gabriel Francini / Domenico Vicini; Haris Bašalić / Eldar Mustafić	2; 6	0; 6

=== 7th to 8th play-off ===
==== Armenia vs. Ethiopia ====
Armenia
2
Dakar Olympic Club, Dakar, Senegal
26 January 1997

Ethiopia
1

			1	2	3
1	(Armenia) (Ethiopia)	Artek Aroutiounyan; Samuel Woldegebriel	6; 2	6; 1
2	(Armenia) (Ethiopia)	Davit Babayan; Yohannes Setegnwandimu	4; 6	3; 6
3	(Armenia) (Ethiopia)	Artek Aroutiounyan / Anri Makichyan; Samuel Woldegebriel / Yohannes Setegnwandimu	6; 4	6; 2
