= Burkina Faso Davis Cup team =

The Burkina Faso Davis Cup team represents Burkina Faso in Davis Cup tennis competition and are governed by the Fédération Burkinabé de Tennis. They have not competed since 2003.

== History ==
Burkina Faso competed in its first Davis Cup in 2001. Their best result was second in their Group IV pool in 2003.

== Last team (2003) ==
- Sansan Dabiré (Captain-player)
- Mamadou Kaboré
- Kadré Nanema

== See also ==
- Davis Cup
