= Hélder Lopes =

Hélder Lopes can refer to:

- Hélder Lopes (footballer) – Portuguese football player
- Hélder Lopes (politician) – East Timorese politician
- Hélder Lopes (tennis) – Portuguese tennis player
