= Boštjan Ošabnik =

Slovenian tennis player

- Full name: Boštjan Ošabnik
- Country (sports): Slovenia
- Born: 7 August 1982 (age 42)
- Plays: Right-handed (two handed-backhand)
- Prize money: $23,061

Singles
- Career record: 3–3 (at ATP Tour level, Grand Slam level, and in Davis Cup)
- Career titles: 3 ITF
- Highest ranking: No. 381 (12 September 2005)

Doubles
- Career record: 1–3 (at ATP Tour level, Grand Slam level, and in Davis Cup)
- Career titles: 4 ITF
- Highest ranking: No. 501 (3 October 2005)
- Last updated on: 16 August 2016.

Boštjan Ošabnik (born 7 August 1982) is a retired Slovenian tennis player.

Ošabnik has a career high ATP singles ranking of 381 achieved on 12 September 2005. He also has a career high ATP doubles ranking of 501 achieved on 3 October 2005.

Playing for Slovenia in Davis Cup, Ošabnik has a W/L record of 4–7.
