= Mali Davis Cup team =

National tennis team

The Mali Davis Cup team represents Mali in Davis Cup tennis competition and are governed by the Fédération Malienne de Tennis. They have not competed since 2004.

== History ==
Mali competed in its first Davis Cup in 2001. Their best result was second place in their Group IV pool in their debut year.

== Last team (2004) ==
- Amadou Diallo
- Mamatou Traoré (Captain-player)
- Madou Keita
- Mohamoud Diallo

== See also ==
- Davis Cup
