= Angola Davis Cup team =

National tennis team

The Angola Davis Cup team represents Angola in Davis Cup tennis competition and are governed by the Federação Angolana de Tenis. They have not competed since 2003.

== History ==
Angola competed in its first Davis Cup in 2001. Their best result was 7th in Group III in 2003.

== Current team (2022) ==
- Zidario Quitomina
- Fernando Andre
- Cleuson Tipewa
- Joao Neves

== See also ==
- Davis Cup
