= Nélson Almeida =

Angolan tennis player

- Full name: Nélson de Almeida
- Country (sports): Angola
- Born: 6 April 1979 (age 47) Luanda, Angola

Singles
- Highest ranking: No. 1142 (14 June 1999)

Doubles
- Career record: 0–1
- Highest ranking: No. 1183 (22 May 2000)

Nélson de Almeida (born 6 April 1979) is an Angolan former professional tennis player.

Almeida, who was born in Luanda, earned world rankings in both singles and doubles. In 2000 he made an ATP Tour main draw appearance at the Estoril Open, as a wildcard pairing with Franco Mata in the doubles event. He played Davis Cup for Angola from 2001 to 2003, winning a team record 11 singles and six doubles rubbers.
