= Ethiopia Davis Cup team =

Tennis competition representing Ethiopia in Davis Cup

The Ethiopia Davis Cup team represented Ethiopia in Davis Cup tennis competition and was governed by the Ethiopian Tennis Federation. It debuted in the 1995 Davis Cup, placed fourth in the Group III pool in 1996 and last competed in 2002.

== See also ==
- Davis Cup
- Ethiopia Billie Jean King Cup team
