= 2023 Davis Cup Africa Zone Group V =

Davis Cup competition in 2023

The Africa Zone was the unique zone within Group 5 of the regional Davis Cup competition in 2023. The zone's competition was held in round robin format in Kinshasa, DR Congo from 21 to 24 June 2023.

== Participating nations ==
- Burundi
- Congo
- DR Congo
- Djibouti
- Ethiopia
- Gabon
- Lesotho
- Madagascar
- Mauritius
- Seychelles
- Tanzania
- Uganda

== Draw ==
Date: 21–24 June 2023

Location: Cercle de Kinshasa, Kinshasa, DR Congo (Clay)

Format: Round-robin basis. Four pools of three teams and nations will play each team once in their pool. Nations finishing first of each pool will enter promotional play-offs, with the first of Pool A facing the first of Pool D and the first of Pool B facing the first of Pool C, and the two winners will be promoted to Africa Zone Group IV in 2024.

=== Seeding ===
| Pot | Nation | Rank^{1} | Seed |
|---|---|---|---|
| 1 | Gabon | | |
| 1 | Uganda | | |
| 1 | Mauritius | | |
| 1 | Congo | | |
| 2 | Djibouti | | |
| 2 | Madagascar | | |
| 2 | DR Congo | | |
| 2 | Seychelles | | |
| 3 | Tanzania | | |
| 3 | Lesotho | | |
| 3 | Ethiopia | | |
| 3 | Burundi | | |

- ^{1}Davis Cup Rankings as of

=== Round Robin ===
==== Pool A ====
| | GAB | TAN | DJI | RR; W–L | Set; W–L | Game; W–L | Standings |
| Gabon | | 3–0 | 3–0 | 2–0 | 6–0 (%) | – (%) | 1 |
| Tanzania | 0–3 | | 3–0 | 1–1 | 3–3 (%) | – (%) | 2 |
| Djibouti | 0–3 | 0–3 | | 0–2 | 0–6 (%) | – (%) | 3 |

==== Pool B ====
| | MAD | LES | UGA | RR; W–L | Set; W–L | Game; W–L | Standings |
| Madagascar | | 3–0 | 3–0 | 2–0 | 6–0 (%) | – (%) | 1 |
| Lesotho | 0–3 | | 2–1 | 1–1 | 2–4 (%) | – (%) | 2 |
| Uganda | 0–3 | 1–2 | | 0–2 | 1–5 (%) | – (%) | 3 |

==== Pool C ====
| | COD | ETH | MRI | RR; W–L | Set; W–L | Game; W–L | Standings |
| DR Congo | | 3–0 | 3–0 | 2–0 | 6–0 (%) | – (%) | 1 |
| Ethiopia | 0–3 | | 3–0 | 1–1 | 3–3 (%) | – (%) | 2 |
| Mauritius | 0–3 | 0–3 | | 0–2 | 0–6 (%) | – (%) | 3 |

==== Pool D ====
| | BDI | CGO | SEY | RR; W–L | Set; W–L | Game; W–L | Standings |
| Burundi | | 3–0 | 3–0 | 2–0 | 6–0 (%) | – (%) | 1 |
| Congo | 0–3 | | 3–0 | 1–1 | 3–3 (%) | – (%) | 2 |
| Seychelles | 0–3 | 0–3 | | 0–2 | 0–6 (%) | – (%) | 3 |

Standings are determined by: 1. number of wins; 2. number of matches; 3. in two-team ties, head-to-head records; 4. in three-team ties, (a) percentage of sets won (head-to-head records if two teams remain tied), then (b) percentage of games won (head-to-head records if two teams remain tied), then (c) Davis Cup rankings.

=== Playoffs ===
| Placing | A Team | Score | B Team |
|---|---|---|---|
| Promotional | Madagascar | 1–2 | DR Congo |
| Promotional | Gabon | 0–2 | Burundi |
| Fifth | Tanzania | 0–2 | Congo |
| Seventh | Lesotho | 2–1 | Ethiopia |
| Ninth | Uganda | 0–2 | Mauritius |
| Eleventh | Djibouti | 0–2 | Seychelles |

- Burundi and DR Congo were promoted to 2024 Davis Cup Africa Zone Group IV.

== Round Robin ==
=== Pool A ===
==== Djibouti vs. Tanzania ====
Djibouti
0
Cercle de Kinshasa, Kinshasa, DR Congo
21 June 2023
Clay

Tanzania
3

| | | | 1 | 2 | 3 |
|---|---|---|---|---|---|
| 1 | (Djibouti) (Tanzania) | Osman Omar Ali; Omari Hamis Sulle | 0; 6 | 1; 6 |
| 2 | (Djibouti) (Tanzania) | Umberto Rizzo; Frank Mshanga | 0; 6 | 1; 6 |
| 3 | (Djibouti) (Tanzania) | Kahen Mohamed Ibrahim / Osman Omar Ali; Yusuph Godwin / Rahim Salehe | 2; 6 | 1; 6 |

==== Gabon vs. Tanzania ====
Gabon
3
Cercle de Kinshasa, Kinshasa, DR Congo
22 June 2023
Clay

Tanzania
0

| | | | 1 | 2 | 3 |
|---|---|---|---|---|---|
| 1 | (Gabon) (Tanzania) | Lyold Obiang Ondo; Omari Hamis Sulle | 6; 2 | 6; 1 |
| 2 | (Gabon) (Tanzania) | Herve Antchandie; Frank Mshanga | 6; 3 | 6; 1 |
| 3 | (Gabon) (Tanzania) | Rene Antchandie / Kryce-Didier Momo-Kassa; Yusuph Godwin / Rahim Salehe | 6; 4 | 6; 0 |

==== Gabon vs. Djibouti ====
Gabon
3
Cercle de Kinshasa, Kinshasa, DR Congo
23 June 2023
Clay

Djibouti
0

| | | | 1 | 2 | 3 |
|---|---|---|---|---|---|
| 1 | (Gabon) (Djibouti) | Rene Antchandie; Osman Omar Ali | 6; 1 | 6; 0 |
| 2 | (Gabon) (Djibouti) | Kryce-Didier Momo-Kassa; Umberto Rizzo | 6; 1 | 6; 0 |
| 3 | (Gabon) (Djibouti) | Herve Antchandie / Lyold Obiang Ondo; Osman Omar Ali / Umberto Rizzo | 6; 0 | 6; 0 |

=== Pool B ===
==== Madagascar vs. Lesotho ====
Madagascar
3
Cercle de Kinshasa, Kinshasa, DR Congo
21 June 2023
Clay

Lesotho
0

| | | | 1 | 2 | 3 |
|---|---|---|---|---|---|
| 1 | (Madagascar) (Lesotho) | Romeo Rakotomalala; Neo Makhakhe | 3; 6 | 6; 2 | 6; 3 |
| 2 | (Madagascar) (Lesotho) | Lucas Andriamasilalao; Mpho Leshoele | 6; 0 | 6; 3 |
| 3 | (Madagascar) (Lesotho) | Nicolas Raharivony / Fenosoa Rasendra Andrianantenaina; Khojane Elliott Khethisa / Bishop Mosebi | 6; 2 | 6; 0 |

==== Uganda vs. Lesotho ====
Uganda
1
Cercle de Kinshasa, Kinshasa, DR Congo
22 June 2023
Clay

Lesotho
2

| | | | 1 | 2 | 3 |
|---|---|---|---|---|---|
| 1 | (Uganda) (Lesotho) | Frank Tayebwa; Neo Makhakhe | 6; 4 | 6; 2 |
| 2 | (Uganda) (Lesotho) | Trevor Solomon Kazibwe; Bishop Mosebi | 2; 6 | 3; 6 |
| 3 | (Uganda) (Lesotho) | Trevor Solomon Kazibwe / Frank Tayebwa; Mpho Leshoele / Bishop Mosebi | 6; 3 | 0; 6 | 4; 6 |

==== Uganda vs. Madagascar ====
Uganda
0
Cercle de Kinshasa, Kinshasa, DR Congo
23 June 2023
Clay

Madagascar
3

| | | | 1 | 2 | 3 |
|---|---|---|---|---|---|
| 1 | (Uganda) (Madagascar) | Frank Tayebwa; Fenosoa Rasendra Andrianantenaina | 5; 7 | 2; 6 |
| 2 | (Uganda) (Madagascar) | Trevor Solomon Kazibwe; Lucas Andriamasilalao | 0; 6 | 2; 6 |
| 3 | (Uganda) (Madagascar) | Paul Ssekandi / Troy Adrian Zziwa; Nicolas Raharivony / Romeo Rakotomalala | 0; 6 | 1; 6 |

=== Pool C ===
==== DR Congo vs. Ethiopia ====
DR Congo
3
Cercle de Kinshasa, Kinshasa, DR Congo
21 June 2023
Clay

Ethiopia
0

| | | | 1 | 2 | 3 |
|---|---|---|---|---|---|---|
| 1 | (Democratic Republic of the Congo) (Ethiopia) | Arnold Ikondo Moke; Yabets Kebede | 1; 6 | 6; 4 | 2; 1 | retired |
| 2 | (Democratic Republic of the Congo) (Ethiopia) | Christian Saidi; Abdella Nedim Mohammed | 4; 6 | 6; 3 | 6; 0 |
| 3 | (Democratic Republic of the Congo) (Ethiopia) | William Bushamuka / Sarma Nkulufa Da Silva; Teame Gebresilase / Abdella Nedim Mohammed | | | | w/o |

==== Mauritius vs. Ethiopia ====
Mauritius
0
Cercle de Kinshasa, Kinshasa, DR Congo
22 June 2023
Clay

Ethiopia
3

| | | | 1 | 2 | 3 |
|---|---|---|---|---|---|
| 1 | (Mauritius) (Ethiopia) | Loic Gebert; Teame Gebresilase | 6; 4 | 3; 6 | 2; 6 |
| 2 | (Mauritius) (Ethiopia) | Jake Lam Hau Ching; Abdella Nedim Mohammed | 6^{7} 7^{9} | 3; 6 |
| 3 | (Mauritius) (Ethiopia) | Leon Samuel Ava / Rushil Seewoosurrun; Teame Gebresilase / Yabets Kebede | 2; 6 | 4; 6 |

==== Mauritius vs. DR Congo ====
Mauritius
0
Cercle de Kinshasa, Kinshasa, DR Congo
23 June 2023
Clay

DR Congo
3

| | | | 1 | 2 | 3 |
|---|---|---|---|---|---|
| 1 | (Mauritius) (Democratic Republic of the Congo) | Loic Gebert; Christian Saidi | 0; 6 | 2; 6 |
| 2 | (Mauritius) (Democratic Republic of the Congo) | Jake Lam Hau Ching; William Bushamuka | 2; 6 | 0; 6 |
| 3 | (Mauritius) (Democratic Republic of the Congo) | Leon Samuel Ava / Rushil Seewoosurrun; William Bushamuka / Sarma Nkulufa Da Silva | 2; 6 | 0; 6 |

=== Pool D ===
==== Seychelles vs. Burundi ====
Seychelles
0
Cercle de Kinshasa, Kinshasa, DR Congo
21 June 2023
Clay

Burundi
3

| | | | 1 | 2 | 3 |
|---|---|---|---|---|---|
| 1 | (Seychelles) (Burundi) | Mikael Vince Gomme; Allan Gatoto | 0; 6 | 1; 6 |
| 2 | (Seychelles) (Burundi) | Marcus Maria; Guy Orly Iradukunda | 0; 6 | 0; 6 |
| 3 | (Seychelles) (Burundi) | Matteo Lavigne / Jamal Nibourette; Guy Orly Iradukunda / Abdoul Shakur Malick | 1; 6 | 0; 6 |

==== Congo vs. Burundi ====
Congo
0
Cercle de Kinshasa, Kinshasa, DR Congo
22 June 2023
Clay

Burundi
3

| | | | 1 | 2 | 3 |
|---|---|---|---|---|---|
| 1 | (Republic of the Congo) (Burundi) | Brasny Ntomosso; Allan Gatoto | 0; 6 | 3; 6 |
| 2 | (Republic of the Congo) (Burundi) | Eytan Miessen; Guy Orly Iradukunda | 0; 6 | 3; 6 |
| 3 | (Republic of the Congo) (Burundi) | Eytan Miessen / Brasny Ntomosso; Allan Gatoto / Guy Orly Iradukunda | 2; 6 | 1; 6 |

==== Congo vs. Seychelles ====
Congo
3
Cercle de Kinshasa, Kinshasa, DR Congo
23 June 2023
Clay

Seychelles
0

| | | | 1 | 2 | 3 |
|---|---|---|---|---|---|
| 1 | (Republic of the Congo) (Seychelles) | Brasny Ntomosso; Matteo Lavigne | 3; 6 | 6; 0 | 6; 0 |
| 2 | (Republic of the Congo) (Seychelles) | Eytan Miessen; Travis Gunatilake | 6; 0 | 6; 0 |
| 3 | (Republic of the Congo) (Seychelles) | Michael Bolidard Ibakakomboyo-Ayessa / Brasny Ntomosso; Matteo Lavigne / Marcus Maria | 7^{7} 6^{4} | 6; 3 |

== Play-offs ==
=== Promotional play-offs ===
==== Madagascar vs. DR Congo ====
Madagascar
1
Cercle de Kinshasa, Kinshasa, DR Congo
24 June 2023
Clay

DR Congo
2

| | | | 1 | 2 | 3 |
|---|---|---|---|---|---|
| 1 | (Madagascar) (Democratic Republic of the Congo) | Fenosoa Rasendra Andrianantenaina; Christian Saidi | 7; 5 | 6; 2 |
| 2 | (Madagascar) (Democratic Republic of the Congo) | Lucas Andriamasilalao; William Bushamuka | 2; 6 | 3; 6 |
| 3 | (Madagascar) (Democratic Republic of the Congo) | Lucas Andriamasilalao / Nicolas Raharivony; William Bushamuka / Sarma Nkulufa Da Silva | 2; 6 | 1; 6 |

==== Gabon vs. Burundi ====
Gabon
0
Cercle de Kinshasa, Kinshasa, DR Congo
24 June 2023
Clay

Burundi
2

| | | | 1 | 2 | 3 |
|---|---|---|---|---|---|---|
| 1 | (Gabon) (Burundi) | Lyold Obiang Ondo; Allan Gatoto | 2; 6 | 6; 3 | 4; 6 |
| 2 | (Gabon) (Burundi) | Herve Antchandie; Guy Orly Iradukunda | 1; 6 | 2; 6 |
| 3 | (Gabon) (Burundi) | Herve Antchandie / Lyold Obiang Ondo; Allan Gatoto / Guy Orly Iradukunda | | | | not played |

=== Fifth place play-off ===
==== Tanzania vs. Congo ====
Tanzania
0
Cercle de Kinshasa, Kinshasa, DR Congo
24 June 2023
Clay

Congo
2

| | | | 1 | 2 | 3 |
|---|---|---|---|---|---|---|
| 1 | (Tanzania) (Republic of the Congo) | Omari Hamis Sulle; Brasny Ntomosso | 2; 6 | 4; 6 |
| 2 | (Tanzania) (Republic of the Congo) | Frank Mshanga; Eytan Miessen | 5; 7 | 6; 3 | 2; 6 |
| 3 | (Tanzania) (Republic of the Congo) | Yusuph Godwin / Rahim Salehe; Eytan Miessen / Brasny Ntomosso | | | | not played |

=== Seventh place play-off ===
==== Lesotho vs. Ethiopia ====
Lesotho
2
Cercle de Kinshasa, Kinshasa, DR Congo
24 June 2023
Clay

Ethiopia
1

| | | | 1 | 2 | 3 |
|---|---|---|---|---|---|
| 1 | (Lesotho) (Ethiopia) | Neo Makhakhe; Yabets Kebede | 7; 5 | 5; 7 | 2; 6 |
| 2 | (Lesotho) (Ethiopia) | Mpho Leshoele; Abdella Nedim Mohammed | 4; 6 | 6; 4 | 6; 4 |
| 3 | (Lesotho) (Ethiopia) | Khojane Elliott Khethisa / Mpho Leshoele; Teame Gebresilase / Abdella Nedim Mohammed | 6; 3 | 6^{4} 7^{7} | 6; 2 |

=== Ninth place play-off ===
==== Uganda vs. Mauritius ====
Uganda
0
Cercle de Kinshasa, Kinshasa, DR Congo
24 June 2023
Clay

Mauritius
2

| | | | 1 | 2 | 3 |
|---|---|---|---|---|---|---|
| 1 | (Uganda) (Mauritius) | Troy Adrian Zziwa; Rushil Seewoosurrun | 3; 6 | 7; 5 | 0; 6 |
| 2 | (Uganda) (Mauritius) | Paul Ssekandi; Jake Lam Hau Ching | 1; 6 | 3; 6 |
| 3 | (Uganda) (Mauritius) | Trevor Solomon Kazibwe / Frank Tayebwa; Leon Samuel Ava / Loic Gebert | | | | not played |

=== Eleventh place play-off ===
==== Djibouti vs. Seychelles ====
Djibouti
0
Cercle de Kinshasa, Kinshasa, DR Congo
24 June 2023
Clay

Seychelles
2

| | | | 1 | 2 | 3 |
|---|---|---|---|---|---|
| 1 | (Djibouti) (Seychelles) | Osman Omar Ali; Matteo Lavigne | 1; 6 | 1; 6 |
| 2 | (Djibouti) (Seychelles) | Umberto Rizzo; Marcus Maria | 3; 6 | 1; 6 |
| 3 | (Djibouti) (Seychelles) | Tannwir Abdoul-Bari / Dante Collaros; Travis Gunatilake / Marcus Maria |

== Final placements ==
| Placing | Teams | |
| Promoted/First | Burundi | DR Congo |
| Third | Gabon | Madagascar |
| Fifth | Congo | |
| Sixth | Tanzania | |
| Seventh | Lesotho | |
| Eighth | Ethiopia | |
| Ninth | Mauritius | |
| Tenth | Uganda | |
| Eleventh | Seychelles | |
| Twelfth | Djibouti | |

- Burundi and DR Congo were promoted to 2024 Davis Cup Africa Zone Group IV.
