= 2025 Davis Cup =

112th edition of the Davis Cup

Details
- Duration: 31 January – 23 November 2025
- Edition: 113th
- Teams: 157

Champion
- Winning nation: Italy (4th title)

The 2025 Davis Cup was the 113th edition of the Davis Cup, a tournament between national teams in men's tennis. It was part of the 2025 ATP Tour calendar.

The tournament's format was changed that year. Under the new format, the September stage (Qualifiers second round) featured seven home-or-away ties held over two days. The seven winning teams joined the host nation in the Finals (also known as the Final 8) knock-out stage in November. The host country would be awarded a spot in the Finals as long as it was ranked in the top 50 nations or one of its players had an individual ranking in the top 10. If these criteria were not met, the last spot in the Finals would be reallocated to a different country as a wild card.

Suriname made its first appearance in the tournament.

== Finals ==
Date: 18–23 November 2025
Venue: SuperTennis Arena, Bologna, Italy
Surface: Hard indoor

The Finals featured the host nation (Italy) and the seven winners from the Qualifiers second round.
H = Host

Participating teams
Argentina	Austria	Belgium	Czech Republic
France	Germany	Italy (H)	Spain

=== Bracket ===
Quarterfinals
1	Italy	2
Austria	0
3	France	0
Belgium	2
Spain	2
4	Czech Republic	1
Argentina	1
2	Germany	2

Semifinals
1	Italy	2
Belgium	0
Spain	2
2	Germany	1

Final
1	Italy	2
Spain	0

== Qualifiers ==
=== Bracket ===
First round
Norway (c)	2
14	Argentina	3

Second round
1	Netherlands (c)	1
14	Argentina	3

First round
2	Australia	3
Sweden (c)	1
Chile	1
13	Belgium (c)	3

Second round
2	Australia (c)	2
13	Belgium	3

First round
3	Canada (c)	2
Hungary	3
Austria (c)	4
12	Finland	0

Second round
Hungary (c)	2
Austria	3

First round
4	Germany	3
Israel (c)	1
Japan (c)	3
11	Great Britain	2

Second round
4	Germany	4
Japan (c)	0

First round
5	United States	4
Chinese Taipei (c)	0
South Korea	0
10	Czech Republic (c)	4

Second round
5	United States (c)	2
10	Czech Republic	3

First round
6	Serbia	2
Denmark (c)	3
Switzerland (c)	1
9	Spain	3

Second round
Denmark	2
9	Spain (c)	3

First round
7	Croatia (c)	3
Slovakia	1
Brazil	0
8	France (c)	4

Second round
7	Croatia (c)	1
8	France	3

- (c) = choice of ground

=== Second round ===
Date: 12–14 September 2025

Fourteen teams will play for seven spots in the Finals, in series decided on a home and away basis.

The qualification is as follows:

- The runners-up of the 2024 Davis Cup (Netherlands; promoted since 2024 champions Italy will host the Finals)
- 13 winners of the Qualifiers first round, held in January–February 2025

The 7 winning teams will play in the Finals alongside the host nation.

Home team	Score	Away team	Location	Venue	Surface
Netherlands [1]	1–3	Argentina [14]	Groningen	MartiniPlaza	Hard (i)
Australia [2]	2–3	Belgium [13]	Sydney	Ken Rosewall Arena	Hard
Hungary	2–3	Austria	Debrecen	Főnix Aréna	Hard (i)
Japan	0–4	Germany [4]	Tokyo	Ariake Coliseum	Hard (i)
United States [5]	2–3	Czech Republic [10]	Delray Beach	Delray Beach Tennis Center	Hard
Spain [9]	3–2	Denmark	Marbella	Club de Tenis Puente Romano	Clay
Croatia [7]	1–3	France [8]	Osijek	Gradski vrt Hall	Clay (i)

=== First round ===
Date: 30 January–2 February 2025

Twenty-six teams will play for thirteen spots in the Qualifiers second Round, in series decided on a home and away basis.

These twenty-six teams are:

- 14 teams ranked 3rd–16th in the 2024 Finals
- 12 winning teams from the 2024 World Group I

The 13 winning teams will play at the Qualifiers second round and the 13 losing teams will play at the World Group I.

#: Nations Ranking as of 25 November 2024.

Seeded teams

1. Australia (#2)
2. Canada (#3)
3. Germany (#5)
4. United States (#6)
5. Serbia (#7)
6. Croatia (#8)
7. France (#9)
8. Spain (#10)
9. Czech Republic (#11)
10. Great Britain (#12)
11. Finland (#13)
12. Belgium (#14)
13. Argentina (#15)

Unseeded teams

- Chile (#16)
- Brazil (#17)
- Slovakia (#18)
- South Korea (#19)
- Sweden (#20)
- Hungary (#22)
- Switzerland (#23)
- Austria (#24)
- Denmark (#25)
- Chinese Taipei (#27)
- Israel (#28)
- Japan (#29)
- Norway (#31)

Home team	Score	Away team	Location	Venue	Surface
Sweden	1–3	Australia [1]	Stockholm	Kungliga Tennishallen	Hard (i)
Canada [2]	2–3	Hungary	Montreal	IGA Stadium	Hard (i)
Israel	1–3	Germany [3]	Vilnius (Lithuania)	SEB Arena	Hard (i)
Chinese Taipei	0–4	United States [4]	Taipei	Taipei Tennis Center	Hard (i)
Denmark	3–2	Serbia [5]	Copenhagen	Royal Arena	Hard (i)
Croatia [6]	3–1	Slovakia	Osijek	Gradski vrt Hall	Hard (i)
France [7]	4–0	Brazil	Orléans	Palais des Sports	Hard (i)
Switzerland	1–3	Spain [8]	Biel/Bienne	Swiss Tennis Arena	Hard (i)
Czech Republic [9]	4–0	South Korea	Ostrava	RT Torax Arena	Hard (i)
Japan	3–2	Great Britain [10]	Miki	Bourbon Beans Dome	Hard (i)
Austria	4–0	Finland [11]	Schwechat	Multiversum Schwechat	Clay (i)
Belgium [12]	3–1	Chile	Hasselt	Sporthal Alverberg	Hard (i)
Norway	2–3	Argentina [13]	Fjellhamar	Fjellhamar Arena	Hard (i)

== World Group I ==
Date: 12–14 September 2025

Twenty-six teams will participate in the World Group I, in series decided on a home and away basis.

These twenty-six teams are:

- 13 losing teams from the Qualifiers first round, held in January–February 2025
- 13 winning teams from the World Group I play-offs, held in January–February 2025:

The 13 winning teams from the World Group I will play in the Qualifiers first round and the 13 losing teams will play in the World Group I play-offs in 2026.

#: Nations Ranking as of 3 February 2025.

Seeded teams

1. Canada (#6)
2. Finland (#14)
3. Serbia (#15)
4. Great Britain (#16)
5. Chile (#17)
6. Brazil (#19)
7. Slovakia (#21)
8. South Korea (#23)
9. Switzerland (#24)
10. Sweden (#25)
11. Portugal (#26)
12. Chinese Taipei (#27)
13. Bosnia and Herzegovina (#28)

Unseeded teams

- Kazakhstan (#29)
- Israel (#30)
- Peru (#31)
- Norway (#32)
- Turkey (#33)
- Poland (#34)
- Colombia (#35)
- Bulgaria (#36)
- India (#37)
- Ecuador (#38=)
- Greece (#38=)
- Luxembourg (#41)
- Tunisia (#47)

Home team	Score	Away team	Location	Venue	Surface
Canada [1]	4–0	Israel	Halifax	Scotiabank Centre	Hard (i)
Bulgaria	3–2	Finland [2]	Plovdiv	TC Lokomotiv	Clay
Serbia [3]	3–1	Turkey	Niš	Čair Sports Center	Hard (i)
Poland	1–3	Great Britain [4]	Gdynia	Polsat Plus Arena	Hard (i)
Chile [5]	4–0	Luxembourg	Santiago	Parque Deportivo Estadio Nacional	Clay
Greece	1–3	Brazil [6]	Athens	Athens Olympic Tennis Centre	Hard
Slovakia [7]	3–1	Colombia	Bratislava	Peugeot Arena	Hard (i)
South Korea [8]	3–1	Kazakhstan	Chuncheon	Chuncheon Songam Sports Park Tennis Court	Hard
Switzerland [9]	1–3	India	Biel/Bienne	Swiss Tennis Arena	Hard (i)
Sweden [10]	3–2	Tunisia	Gothenburg	Partille Arena	Hard (i)
Peru	3–1	Portugal [11]	Lima	Club Lawn Tennis de la Exposición	Clay
Chinese Taipei [12]	2–3	Norway	Taipei	Taipei Tennis Centre	Hard (i)
Ecuador	3–2	Bosnia and Herzegovina [13]	Quito	Club Rancho San Francisco	Clay

=== Play-offs ===
Date: 31 January–2 February 2025

Twenty-six teams will play for thirteen spots in the World Group I, in series decided on a home and away basis.

These twenty-six teams are:

- 12 losing teams from 2024 World Group I
- 12 winning teams from 2024 World Group II
- 2 highest-ranked losing teams from 2024 World Group II (Mexico and Pakistan)

The 13 winning teams from the play-offs will qualify for the World Group I and the 13 losing teams will play at the World Group II.

#: Nations Ranking as of 18 September 2024.

Seeded teams

1. Kazakhstan (#21)
2. Portugal (#26)
3. Bosnia and Herzegovina (#30)
4. Colombia (#32)
5. Turkey (#33)
6. Peru (#34)
7. Ukraine (#35)
8. Ecuador (#36)
9. Romania (#37)
10. India (#38)
11. Greece (#39)
12. Lithuania (#40)
13. Poland (#41)

Unseeded teams

- Uzbekistan (#42)
- Bulgaria (#43)
- Egypt (#44)
- Uruguay (#45)
- Lebanon (#46=)
- Mexico (#46=)
- Pakistan (#46=)
- Monaco (#51)
- Barbados (#53)
- Luxembourg (#54=)
- Tunisia (#56)
- Georgia (#61)
- Togo (#73)

Home team	Score	Away team	Location	Venue	Surface
Kazakhstan [1]	4–0	Pakistan	Astana	Beeline Arena	Hard (i)
Monaco	2–3	Portugal [2]	Roquebrune-Cap-Martin (France)	Monte Carlo Country Club	Clay
Uzbekistan	1–3	Bosnia and Herzegovina [3]	Tashkent	Olympic Tennis School	Hard (i)
Colombia [4]	3–2	Barbados	Ibagué	Complejo de Raqueta	Clay
Turkey [5]	5–0	Mexico	Istanbul	Tenis Eskrim Dağcılık SK	Hard (i)
Lebanon	0–4	Peru [6]	Cairo (Egypt)	Smash Sporting Club	Clay
Tunisia	3–2	Ukraine [7]	El Menzah	El Menzah Sports Palace	Hard (i)
Ecuador [8]	3–1	Uruguay	Salinas	Salinas Golf y Tenis Club	Hard
Romania [9]	1–3	Bulgaria	Craiova	Polyvalent Hall	Hard (i)
India [10]	4–0	Togo	New Delhi	DLTA Complex	Hard
Greece [11]	3–2	Egypt	Athens	Ace Tennis Club	Clay (i)
Luxembourg	3–1	Lithuania [12]	Luxembourg City	d'Coque	Hard (i)
Georgia	0–4	Poland [13]	Tbilisi	Tbilisi Sports Palace	Hard (i)

== World Group II ==
Date: 12–14 September 2025

Twenty-six teams will participate in the World Group II, in series decided on a home and away basis.

These twenty-six teams are:

- 13 losing teams from the World Group I play-offs, held in January–February 2025
- 13 winning teams from the World Group II play-offs, held in January–February 2025

The 13 winning teams from the World Group II will play in the World Group I play-offs and the 13 losing teams will play in the World Group II play-offs in 2026.

#: Nations Ranking as of 3 February 2025.

Seeded teams

1. Ukraine (#40)
2. Romania (#42)
3. Lithuania (#43)
4. Egypt (#44)
5. Uzbekistan (#45)
6. Ireland (#46)
7. Monaco (#48=)
8. New Zealand (#48=)
9. Uruguay (#50)
10. Morocco (#51)
11. Lebanon (#52)
12. Mexico (#53=)
13. Pakistan (#53=)

Unseeded teams

- Barbados (#55=)
- Hong Kong (#55=)
- Georgia (#57)
- South Africa (#58)
- El Salvador (#59)
- Estonia (#60)
- Togo (#61)
- China (#62)
- Slovenia (#63)
- Paraguay (#64)
- Cyprus (#65)
- Dominican Republic (#66)
- Benin (#68)

Home team	Score	Away team	Location	Venue	Surface
Ukraine [1]	4–0	Dominican Republic	Antalya (Turkey)	Megasaray Club Belek	Clay
El Salvador	1–3	Romania [2]	Santa Tecla	Federación Salvadoreña de Tenis	Hard
Lithuania [3]	4–0	Benin	Vilnius	SEB Arena	Hard (i)
Togo	1–3	Egypt [4]	Lomé	Stade de Tennis FTT	Hard
Hong Kong	3–1	Uzbekistan [5]	Hong Kong	Victoria Park Tennis Stadium	Hard
Ireland [6]	1–3	China	Dublin	Sport Ireland National Indoor Arena	Hard (i)
Cyprus	1–3	Monaco [7]	Nicosia	National Tennis Centre	Hard
New Zealand [8]	3–1	Georgia	Palmerston North	Central Energy Trust Arena	Hard (i)
Slovenia	4–0	Uruguay [9]	Ljubljana	Tennis Academy Breskvar	Hard
South Africa	1–4	Morocco [10]	Pretoria	Groenkloof Tennis Club	Hard
Lebanon [11]	4–0	Barbados	Cairo (Egypt)	Palm Hill Sports Club	Clay
Paraguay	3–1	Pakistan [12]	Asunción	Club Internacional de Tenis	Clay
Estonia	1–3	Mexico [13]	Tallinn	Kalev Sports Hall	Hard (i)

=== Play-offs ===
Date: 31 January–2 February 2025

Twenty-six teams will play for thirteen spots in the World Group II, in series decided on a home and away basis.

These twenty-six teams are:

- 10 lowest-ranked losing teams from 2024 World Group II
- 12 teams promoted from their 2024 Group III zone:
  - 3 from Europe
  - 3 from Asia/Oceania
  - 3 from Americas
  - 3 from Africa
- 4 teams that were the highest-ranked non-promoted teams from their respective 2024 Group III zones (Benin, Indonesia, Jamaica and Moldova).

The 13 winning teams from the play-offs will play at the World Group II and the 13 losing teams will play at the 2025 Group III of the corresponding continental zone.

#: Nations Ranking as of 18 September 2024.

Seeded teams

1. Latvia (#46=)
2. New Zealand (#46=)
3. Ireland (#52)
4. Morocco (#54=)
5. South Africa (#57)
6. El Salvador (#58)
7. Hong Kong (#59)
8. Estonia (#60)
9. Bolivia (#62)
10. Slovenia (#63)
11. China (#64)
12. Paraguay (#65)
13. Thailand (#66)

Unseeded teams

- Dominican Republic (#67)
- Indonesia (#68)
- Cyprus (#69)
- Jamaica (#70)
- Zimbabwe (#71)
- Namibia (#72)
- Venezuela (#73)
- Saudi Arabia (#74)
- Syria (#79)
- Moldova (#80)
- Nigeria (#82)
- Benin (#85=)
- Montenegro (#92)

Home team	Score	Away team	Location	Venue	Surface
Benin	3–2	Latvia [1]	Cotonou	Sofitel Marina Hotel	Hard
Jamaica	2–3	New Zealand [2]	Kingston	Eric Bell National Tennis Centre	Hard
Saudi Arabia	0–5	Ireland [3]	Riyadh	Net Tennis Academy	Hard
Zimbabwe	0–4	Morocco [4]	Harare	Harare Sports Club	Hard
South Africa [5]	3–1	Nigeria	Pretoria	Groenkloof Tennis Club	Hard
El Salvador [6]	3–2	Moldova	Santa Tecla	Cancha Estadio Rafael Arévalo	Hard
Namibia	2–3	Hong Kong [7]	Windhoek	Central Tennis Club	Hard
Estonia [8]	4–0	Venezuela	Tallinn	Forus Tennisecenter Tondi	Hard (i)
Dominican Republic	3–1	Bolivia [9]	Santo Domingo Este	Centro Nacional de Tenis	Hard
Slovenia [10]	4–0	Indonesia	Velenje	Bela dvorana Velenje	Clay (i)
China [11]	4–0	Montenegro	Zhuhai	Hengqin International Tennis Center	Hard
Paraguay [12]	w/o	Syria	Asunción	Club Internacional de Tenis	Clay
Cyprus	4–0	Thailand [13]	Nicosia	Nicosia Field Club	Clay

== Group III ==
The top three nations of each continental zone will be promoted to the 2026 World Group II play-offs and the last two nations will be relegated to the 2026 Group IV.

=== Americas zone ===
Dates: Week of 9 June 2025
Location: Costa Rica Country Club, San José, Costa Rica (hard, indoors)

Participating teams

- Aruba
- Bermuda
- Bolivia
- Costa Rica
- Honduras
- Jamaica
- Puerto Rico
- Venezuela

Promotions/Relegations

- Bermuda, Bolivia and Puerto Rico qualify for the 2026 Davis Cup World Group II play-offs, while Jamaica also qualified as the nation with the highest Nations Ranking from the teams finishing fourth in each of the four 2025 Regional Group III events
- Aruba and Honduras are relegated to 2026 Americas Zone Group IV

=== Asia/Oceania zone ===
Dates: Week of 14 July 2025
Location: Hanaka Paris Ocean Park, Bắc Ninh, Vietnam (hard)

Participating teams

- Cambodia
- Indonesia
- Jordan
- Saudi Arabia
- Singapore
- Sri Lanka
- Syria
- Thailand
- Vietnam

Withdrawn

- Iran

Promotions/Relegations

- Indonesia, Syria and Thailand qualify for the 2026 Davis Cup World Group II play-offs
- Cambodia and Sri Lanka are relegated to 2026 Asia/Oceania Zone Group IV

=== Europe zone ===
Dates: Week of 9 June 2025
Location: Tennis Club JUG, Skopje, North Macedonia (clay)

Participating teams

- Armenia
- Latvia
- Malta
- Moldova
- Montenegro
- North Macedonia

Promotions/Relegations

- Latvia, Montenegro and North Macedonia qualify for the 2026 Davis Cup World Group II play-offs
- Armenia and Malta are relegated to 2026 Europe Zone Group IV

=== Africa zone ===
Dates: Week of 11 August 2025
Location: Harare Sports Club, Harare, Zimbabwe (hard)

Participating teams

- Algeria
- Namibia
- Nigeria
- Senegal
- Zimbabwe

Promotions/Relegations

- Namibia, Nigeria and Senegal qualify for the 2026 Davis Cup World Group II play-offs
- Algeria and Zimbabwe are relegated to 2026 Africa Zone Group IV

== Group IV ==
The top two nations of each continental zone will be promoted to the 2026 Group III and the last two nations from the Asia/Oceania and Africa zone will be relegated to the 2026 Group V.

=== Americas zone ===
Date: Week of August 4
Location: National Racquet Sports Centre, Tacarigua, Trinidad and Tobago (hard)

Participating teams

- Antigua and Barbuda
- Bahamas
- Cuba
- Guatemala
- Haiti
- Panama
- Saint Lucia
- Suriname
- Trinidad and Tobago
- U.S. Virgin Islands

Withdrawn

- Nicaragua

Inactive teams

- Eastern Caribbean

Promotions

- Bahamas and Guatemala qualify for the 2026 Americas Zone Group III

=== Asia/Oceania zone ===
Dates: Week of 14 July 2025
Location: National Tennis Centre, Kuala Lumpur, Malaysia (hard)

Participating teams

- Iraq
- Kuwait
- Kyrgyzstan
- Malaysia
- Nepal
- Pacific Oceania
- Philippines
- Qatar

Promotions/Relegations

- Malaysia and Philippines qualify for the 2026 Asia/Oceania Zone Group III
- Nepal and Pacific Oceania are relegated to 2026 Asia/Oceania Zone Group V

=== Europe zone ===
Dates: Week of 9 June 2025
Location: National Sport Park, Tirana, Albania (hard)

Participating teams

- Albania
- Andorra
- Azerbaijan
- Iceland
- Kosovo
- Liechtenstein
- San Marino

Inactive teams

- Belarus (suspended)
- Russia (suspended)

Promotions

- Azerbaijan and Kosovo qualify for the 2026 Europe Zone Group III

=== Africa zone ===
Dates: Week of 9 June 2025
Location: Academia de Ténis Kikuxi Villas Club, Luanda, Angola (hard)

Participating teams

- Angola
- Burundi
- DR Congo
- Gabon
- Ghana
- Ivory Coast
- Kenya
- Mauritius

Promotions/Relegations

- Burundi and Ivory Coast qualify for the 2026 Africa Zone Group III
- Gabon and Mauritius are relegated to 2026 Africa Zone Group V

== Group V ==
The top two nations of each continental zone will be promoted to the 2026 Group IV.

=== Asia/Oceania zone ===
Dates: Week of 17 November 2025
Location: Bahrain Tennis Federation Polytechnic University, Isa Town, Bahrain (hard)

Participating teams

- Bahrain
- Bangladesh
- Brunei
- Guam
- Laos
- Macau
- Maldives
- Mongolia
- Myanmar
- Northern Mariana Islands
- Tajikistan
- Turkmenistan
- United Arab Emirates
- Yemen

Withdrawn

- Bhutan

Inactive teams

- Oman

Promotions

- Northern Mariana Islands and Turkmenistan qualify for the 2026 Asia/Oceania Zone Group IV

=== Africa zone ===
Date: Week of 21 July 2025
Location: National Tennis Centre, Gaborone, Botswana (hard)

Participating teams

- Botswana
- Cameroon
- Congo
- Djibouti
- Ethiopia
- Lesotho
- Libya
- Madagascar
- Mauritania
- Mozambique
- Rwanda
- Seychelles
- Sudan
- Tanzania
- Uganda

Inactive teams

- Burkina Faso
- Mali
- Zambia

Promotions

- Botswana and Mozambique qualify for the 2026 Africa Zone Group IV
