= 2024 Davis Cup =

112th edition of the Davis Cup

Details
- Duration: 2 February – 24 November 2024
- Edition: 112th

Champion
- Winning nation: Italy (3rd title)

Italy defeated the Netherlands 2–0 in the final tennis match of the 2024 Davis Cup. It was the 112th edition of the Davis Cup, a tournament between national teams in men's tennis. It was part of the 2024 ATP Tour calendar.

Mauritania and Northern Mariana Islands made their first appearances in the tournament.

== Davis Cup Finals ==
=== Knockout stage ===
Date: 19–24 November 2024
Venue: Martin Carpena Arena, Málaga, Spain
Surface: Hard indoor

Quarterfinals
21 November
Italy	2
Argentina	1
21 November
United States	1
Australia	2
20 November
Germany	2
Canada	0
19 November
Netherlands	2
Spain	1

Semifinals
23 November
Italy	2
Australia	0
22 November
Germany	0
Netherlands	2

Final
24 November
Italy	2
Netherlands	0

=== Group stage ===
Date: 10–15 September 2024
Venues: Unipol Arena, Bologna, Italy
Manchester Arena, Manchester, Great Britain
Pavelló Municipal Font de Sant Lluís, Valencia, Spain
Hengqin Tennis Center, Zhuhai, China
Surface: Hard indoor

Sixteen nations will take part in the group stage of the Finals. The qualification was as follows:

- 2 finalists of the 2023 Finals (Australia and Italy)
- 2 wild card teams (Great Britain and Spain)
- 12 winners of the qualifying round, in February 2024

The top two teams in each group qualify for the knockout stage of the Finals.

TH = Title holder, 2023F = Finalist from the 2023 tournament, WC = Wild card, H = Host

Participating teams
Argentina	Australia (2023F)	Belgium	Brazil
Canada	Chile	Czech Republic	Finland
France	Germany	Great Britain (WC) (H)	Italy (TH) (H)
Netherlands	Slovakia	Spain (WC) (H)	United States

==== Group stage results ====
Qualified for the Knockout stage
Eliminated

G = Group, T = Ties, M = Matches

G	Winner			Runner-up			Third			Fourth		
G	Nation	T	M	Nation	T	M	Nation	T	M	Nation	T	M
A	Italy	3–0	6–3	Netherlands^{*}	1–2	4–5	Belgium^{*}	1–2	4–5	Brazil^{*}	1–2	4–5
B	Spain	3–0	7–2	Australia	2–1	6–3	France	1–2	4–5	Czech Republic	0–3	1–8
C	United States	3–0	8–1	Germany	2–1	7–2	Chile	1–2	2–7	Slovakia	0–3	1–8
D	Canada	3–0	7–2	Argentina	2–1	6–3	Great Britain	1–2	4–5	Finland	0–3	1–8

^{*} Three-way tie broken by percentage of sets won by each nation.

=== Qualifying round ===
Date: 1–4 February 2024

Twenty-four teams played for twelve spots in the finals, in series decided on a home and away basis.

The 24 teams were:

- 12 teams ranked 3rd–16th in the 2023 Finals except the 2 wild card teams
- 12 winning teams from the 2023 World Group I

The 12 winning teams from the qualifying round will play at the group stage of the Finals and the 12 losing teams will play at the World Group I.

#: Nations Ranking as of 27 November 2023.

Seeded teams

1. Canada (#2)
2. Serbia (#5)
3. Croatia (#6)
4. Germany (#8)
5. Netherlands (#9)
6. Czech Republic (#10)
7. United States (#11)
8. Finland (#12)
9. France (#13)
10. Kazakhstan (#14)
11. Sweden (#15)
12. Chile (#16)

Unseeded teams

- Belgium (#17)
- South Korea (#18)
- Argentina (#19)
- Switzerland (#21)
- Hungary (#22)
- Slovakia (#23)
- Brazil (#25)
- Portugal (#26)
- Israel (#31)
- Chinese Taipei (#32)
- Peru (#34)
- Ukraine (#35)

Home team	Score	Away team	Location	Venue	Surface
Canada [1]	3–1	South Korea	Montreal	IGA Stadium	Hard (i)
Serbia [2]	0–4	Slovakia	Kraljevo	Kraljevo Sports Hall	Clay (i)
Croatia [3]	1–3	Belgium	Varaždin	Varaždin Arena	Hard (i)
Hungary	2–3	Germany [4]	Tatabánya	Multifunctional Arena	Hard (i)
Netherlands [5]	3–2	Switzerland	Groningen	MartiniPlaza	Hard (i)
Czech Republic [6]	4–0	Israel	Třinec	Vitality Slezsko	Hard (i)
Ukraine	0–4	United States [7]	Vilnius (Lithuania)	SEB Arena	Hard (i)
Finland [8]	3–1	Portugal	Turku	Gatorade Center	Hard (i)
Chinese Taipei	0–4	France [9]	Taipei	Taipei Tennis Center	Hard (i)
Argentina	3–2	Kazakhstan [10]	Rosario	Jockey Club de Rosario	Clay
Sweden [11]	1–3	Brazil	Helsingborg	Helsingborg Arena	Hard (i)
Chile [12]	3–2	Peru	Santiago	Estadio Nacional	Hard

== World Group I ==
Date: 13–15 September 2024

Twenty-four teams participated in the World Group I, in series decided on a home and away basis.

The 24 teams were:

- 12 losing teams from the qualifying round, in February 2024
- 12 winning teams from the World Group I play-offs, in February 2024

The 12 winning teams from the World Group I will play in the qualifying round and the 12 losing teams will play in the World Group I play-offs in 2025.

#: Nations ranking as of 5 February 2024.

Seeded teams

1. Serbia (#5)
2. Croatia (#7)
3. Sweden (#18)
4. Kazakhstan (#19)
5. South Korea (#21)
6. Switzerland (#22)
7. Hungary (#23)
8. Portugal (#24)
9. Austria (#25)
10. Bosnia and Herzegovina (#26)
11. Israel (#27)
12. Colombia (#28)

Unseeded teams

- Chinese Taipei (#29)
- Japan (#30)
- Norway (#31)
- Turkey (#32)
- Denmark (#33)
- Peru (#34)
- Ukraine (#35)
- India (#36)
- Greece (#38)
- Lithuania (#40)
- Poland (#41)
- Egypt (#43)

Home team	Score	Away team	Location	Venue	Surface
Serbia [1]	3–1	Greece	Belgrade	Aleksandar Nikolić Hall	Hard (i)
Croatia [2]	4–0	Lithuania	Varaždin	Varaždin Arena	Hard (i)
Sweden [3]	4–0	India	Stockholm	Kungliga tennishallen	Hard (i)
Kazakhstan [4]	1–3	Denmark	Astana	National Tennis Centre	Hard (i)
Poland	1–3	South Korea [5]	Zielona Góra	CRS Hall Zielona Góra	Hard (i)
Switzerland [6]	4–0	Peru	Biel/Bienne	Swiss Tennis Arena	Hard (i)
Egypt	2–3	Hungary [7]	Cairo	Gezira Sporting Club	Clay
Norway	3–1	Portugal [8]	Bekkestua	Nadderud Arena	Hard (i)
Austria [9]	3–0	Turkey	Bad Waltersdorf	Sportaktivpark Bad Waltersdorf	Clay
Chinese Taipei	3–2	Bosnia and Herzegovina [10]	Taipei	Taipei Tennis Center	Hard (i)
Israel [11]	3–1	Ukraine	Larnaca (Cyprus)	Herodotou Tennis Academy	Hard
Japan	3–1	Colombia [12]	Tokyo	Ariake Coliseum	Hard

=== Play-offs ===
Date: 2–4 February 2024

Twenty-four teams played for twelve spots in the World Group I, in series decided on a home and away basis.

These 24 teams were:

- 12 losing teams from 2023 World Group I
- 12 winning teams from 2023 World Group II

The 12 winning teams from the play-offs qualified for the World Group I and the 12 losing teams will play at the World Group II.

#: Nations Ranking as of 18 September 2023.

Seeded teams

1. Colombia (#20)
2. Japan (#24)
3. Austria (#27)
4. Ecuador (#28)
5. Norway (#29)
6. Romania (#30)
7. Bosnia and Herzegovina (#33)
8. Uzbekistan (#36)
9. Turkey (#37)
10. Denmark (#38)
11. India (#39)
12. Lithuania (#40)

Unseeded teams

- New Zealand (#41)
- Mexico (#42)
- Bulgaria (#43)
- Greece (#44)
- Pakistan (#45)
- Latvia (#47)
- Lebanon (#48)
- Ireland (#50)
- Poland (#51)
- Egypt (#55)
- Luxembourg (#64)
- Georgia (#66)

Home team	Score	Away team	Location	Venue	Surface
Colombia [1]	3–2	Luxembourg	Bogotá	Club Bellavista Colsubsidio	Clay
Lebanon	1–3	Japan [2]	Cairo (Egypt)	Smash Sporting Club	Clay
Ireland	0–4	Austria [3]	Limerick	UL Sport Arena	Hard (i)
Egypt	3–1	Ecuador [4]	Cairo	Gezira Sporting Club	Clay
Norway [5]	4–0	Latvia	Gjøvik	Gjøvik Olympic Cavern Hall	Hard (i)
Greece	4–0	Romania [6]	Ano Liosia	Ano Liosia Olympic Hall	Hard (i)
Bulgaria	1–3	Bosnia and Herzegovina [7]	Burgas	Tennis Center Avenue	Hard (i)
Uzbekistan [8]	0–4	Poland	Tashkent	Humo Arena	Hard (i)
New Zealand	1–3	Turkey [9]	Auckland	ASB Tennis Arena	Hard
Mexico	1–3	Denmark [10]	Zapopan	Hacienda San Javier	Clay
Pakistan	0–4	India [11]	Islamabad	Pakistan Sports Complex	Grass
Lithuania [12]	3–2	Georgia	Vilnius	SEB Arena	Hard (i)

== World Group II ==
Date: 13–16 September 2024

Twenty-four teams participated in the World Group II, in series decided on a home and away basis.

These 24 teams were:

- 12 losing teams from the World Group I play-offs, in February 2024
- 12 winning teams from the World Group II play-offs, in February 2024

The 12 winning teams and 2 highest-ranked losing teams from the World Group II will play in the World Group I play-offs and the 10 lowest-ranked losing teams will play in the World Group II play-offs in 2025.

#: Nations ranking as of 5 February 2024.

Seeded teams

1. Romania (#37)
2. Ecuador (#39)
3. Uzbekistan (#42)
4. Bulgaria (#44)
5. Pakistan (#45=)
6. Latvia (#45=)
7. Mexico (#45=)
8. New Zealand (#45=)
9. Ireland (#49)
10. Lebanon (#50)
11. Morocco (#51)
12. Uruguay (#52)

Unseeded teams

- Barbados (#53)
- South Africa (#54)
- El Salvador (#55)
- Hong Kong (#56)
- Monaco (#57)
- Tunisia (#58)
- Luxembourg (#59)
- Georgia (#60)
- Bolivia (#61)
- China (#62)
- Togo (#65)
- Estonia (#66)

Home team	Score	Away team	Location	Venue	Surface
Romania [1]	3–2	China	Craiova	Polyvalent Hall	Hard (i)
Hong Kong	2–3	Ecuador [2]	Hong Kong	Victoria Park Tennis Stadium	Hard
Uzbekistan [3]	3–1	Estonia	Tashkent	Sakhovat Sport Servis	Hard
Bulgaria [4]	3–2	El Salvador	Plovdiv	Tennis Club Lokomotiv	Clay
Barbados	3–1	Pakistan [5]	Bridgetown	National Tennis Centre	Hard
Togo	4–0	Latvia [6]	Lomé	Stade Omnisport de Lomé	Hard
Georgia	3–2	Mexico [7]	Tbilisi	Alex Metreveli Tennis Complex	Hard
New Zealand [8]	2–3	Luxembourg	Palmerston North	Fly Palmy Arena	Hard (i)
Tunisia	3–2	Ireland [9]	La Marsa	Tennis Club de l'Avenir Sportif de la Marsa	Clay
Lebanon [10]	3–1	South Africa	Cairo (Egypt)	Palm Hills Sports Club	Clay
Morocco [11]	0–4	Monaco	Marrakesh	Royal Tennis Club de Marrakech	Clay (i)
Bolivia	1–3	Uruguay [12]	Santa Cruz de la Sierra	Las Palmas Country Club	Clay

=== Play-offs ===
Date: 2–4 February 2024 (except for Iran–Estonia on 15–16 March 2024)

Twenty-four teams will play for twelve spots in the World Group II, in series decided on a home and away basis.

These 24 teams are:

- 12 losing teams from 2023 World Group II
- 12 teams promoted from their 2023 Group III zone:
  - 3 from Europe
  - 3 from Asia/Oceania
  - 3 from Americas
  - 3 from Africa

The 12 winning teams from the play-offs will play at the World Group II and the 12 losing teams will play at the 2024 Group III of the corresponding continental zone.

#: Nations Ranking as of 18 September 2023.

Seeded teams

1. Uruguay (#46)
2. Slovenia (#49)
3. Tunisia (#52)
4. El Salvador (#53)
5. Hong Kong (#54)
6. Barbados (#56)
7. Morocco (#57)
8. South Africa (#58)
9. Indonesia (#59)
10. Bolivia (#60)
11. Estonia (#61)
12. Monaco (#62)

Unseeded teams

- Paraguay (#63)
- Jamaica (#65)
- China (#67)
- Thailand (#68)
- Vietnam (#70)
- Zimbabwe (#73)
- Cyprus (#74)
- Iran (#75)
- Costa Rica (#76)
- Pacific Oceania (#77)
- Moldova (#86)
- Togo (#94)

Home team	Score	Away team	Location	Venue	Surface
Uruguay [1]	3–2	Moldova	Montevideo	Carrasco Lawn Tennis Club	Clay
China	3–2	Slovenia [2]	Guangzhou	Guangzhou Development District International Tennis School	Hard
Tunisia [3]	3–0	Costa Rica	Tunis	Cité Nationale Sportive El Menzah	Hard
El Salvador [4]	4–0	Pacific Oceania	Santa Tecla	Polideportivo de Ciudad Merliot	Hard
Hong Kong [5]	3–1	Zimbabwe	Hong Kong	Victoria Park Tennis Stadium	Hard
Jamaica	2–3	Barbados [6]	Kingston	Eric Bell National Tennis Centre	Hard
Cyprus	1–3	Morocco [7]	Nicosia	National Tennis Centre	Hard
Vietnam	2–3	South Africa [8]	Từ Sơn	Hanaka Paris Ocean Park	Hard
Togo	3–2	Indonesia [9]	Lomé	Stade Omnisport de Lomé	Hard
Bolivia [10]	4–0	Thailand	La Paz	Club de Tenis La Paz	Clay
Iran	1–3	Estonia [11]	Colombo (Sri Lanka)	Sri Lanka Lawn Tennis Association Complex	Clay
Paraguay	1–3	Monaco [12]	Asunción	Club Internacional de Tenis	Clay

== Group III ==
The top three nations of each continental zone will be promoted to the 2025 World Group II play-offs and the last two nations will be relegated to the 2025 Group IV.

=== Americas zone ===
Dates: 17–22 June 2024
Location: Club Internacional de Tenis, Asunción, Paraguay (Clay)

Participating teams

- Bahamas
- Bermuda
- Costa Rica
- Dominican Republic
- Guatemala
- Jamaica
- Paraguay
- Puerto Rico
- Venezuela

Promotions/Relegations

- Dominican Republic, Paraguay and Venezuela qualify for the 2025 Davis Cup World Group II play-offs and Jamaica also qualified as one of the four highest-ranked non-promoted teams in each 2024 Regional Group III event
- Bahamas and Guatemala are relegated to 2025 Americas Zone Group IV

=== Asia/Oceania zone ===
Dates: 10–15 June 2024
Location: Jordan Tennis Federation, Amman, Jordan (Hard)

Participating teams

- Indonesia
- Iran
- Jordan
- Malaysia
- Pacific Oceania
- Saudi Arabia
- Singapore
- Syria
- Thailand
- Vietnam

Promotions/Relegations

- Saudi Arabia, Syria and Thailand qualify for the 2025 Davis Cup World Group II play-offs and Indonesia also qualified as one of the four highest-ranked non-promoted teams in each 2024 Regional Group III event
- Malaysia and Pacific Oceania are relegated to 2025 Asia/Oceania Zone Group IV

=== Europe zone ===
Dates: 19–22 June 2024
Location: Tennis Club Bellevue, Ulcinj, Montenegro (Clay)

Participating teams

- Azerbaijan
- Cyprus
- Kosovo
- Moldova
- Montenegro
- North Macedonia
- Slovenia

Promotions/Relegations

- Cyprus, Montenegro and Slovenia qualify for the 2025 Davis Cup World Group II play-offs and Moldova also qualified as one of the four highest-ranked non-promoted teams in each 2024 Regional Group III event
- Azerbaijan and Kosovo are relegated to 2025 Europe Zone Group IV

=== Africa zone ===
Dates: 15–20 July 2024
Location: National Tennis Centre, Abuja, Nigeria (Hard)

Participating teams

- Benin
- Ghana
- Ivory Coast
- Namibia
- Nigeria
- Zimbabwe

Promotions/Relegations

- Namibia, Nigeria and Zimbabwe qualify for the 2025 Davis Cup World Group II play-offs and Benin also qualified as one of the four highest-ranked non-promoted teams in each 2024 Regional Group III event
- Ghana and Ivory Coast are relegated to 2025 Davis Cup Africa Zone Group IV

== Group IV ==
The top two nations of each continental zone will be promoted to the 2025 Group III and the last two nations from the Asia/Oceania and Africa zone will be relegated to the 2025 Group V.

=== Americas zone ===
Date: 22–27 July 2024
Location: National Racquet Sport Centre, Tacarigua, Trinidad and Tobago (Hard)

Participating teams

- Antigua and Barbuda
- Aruba
- Cuba
- Haiti
- Honduras
- Nicaragua
- Saint Lucia
- Trinidad and Tobago
- U.S. Virgin Islands

Withdrawn

- Panama

Inactive teams

- Eastern Caribbean

Promotions

- Aruba and Honduras qualify for the 2025 Americas Zone Group III

=== Asia/Oceania zone ===
Date: 10–13 July 2024
Location: Morodok Techo National Sports Complex, Phnom Penh, Cambodia (Hard)

Participating teams

- Cambodia
- Iraq
- Kuwait
- Kyrgyzstan
- Myanmar
- Qatar
- Sri Lanka
- United Arab Emirates

Promotions/Relegations

- Cambodia and Sri Lanka qualify for the 2025 Asia/Oceania Zone Group III
- Myanmar and United Arab Emirates are relegated to 2025 Asia/Oceania Zone Group V

=== Europe zone ===
Date: 12–15 June 2024
Location: National Sport Park, Tirana, Albania (Hard)

Participating teams

- Albania
- Andorra
- Armenia
- Iceland
- Liechtenstein
- Malta
- San Marino

Inactive teams

- Belarus (suspended)
- Russia (suspended)

Promotions

- Armenia and Malta qualify for the 2025 Europe Zone Group III

=== Africa zone ===
Date: 19–22 June 2024
Location: Academia de Ténis Kikuxi Villas Club, Luanda, Angola (Hard)

Participating teams

- Algeria
- Angola
- Burundi
- Cameroon
- DR Congo
- Kenya
- Rwanda
- Senegal

Promotions/Relegations

- Algeria and Senegal qualify for the 2025 Africa Zone Group III
- Cameroon and Rwanda are relegated to 2025 Africa Zone Group V

== Group V ==
The top two nations of each continental zone will be promoted to the 2025 Group IV.

=== Asia/Oceania zone ===
Date: 20–23 November 2024
Location: Bahrain Polytechnic, Isa Town, Bahrain (Hard)

Participating teams

- Bahrain
- Bangladesh
- Bhutan
- Brunei
- Guam
- Laos
- Macau
- Maldives
- Mongolia
- Nepal
- Northern Mariana Islands (Note: Debuting team)
- Philippines (Note: The Philippines return at Group V, after a three-year suspension due to governance issues was lifted)
- Tajikistan
- Turkmenistan
- Yemen

Inactive teams

- Oman

Promotions

- Nepal and Philippines qualify for the 2025 Asia/Oceania Zone Group IV

=== Africa zone ===
Date: 17–20 July 2024
Location: National Tennis Centre, Gaborone, Botswana (Hard)

Participating teams

- Botswana
- Congo
- Djibouti
- Ethiopia
- Gabon
- Lesotho
- Libya
- Madagascar
- Mauritania
- Mauritius
- Mozambique
- Seychelles
- Sudan
- Tanzania
- Uganda

Inactive teams

- Burkina Faso
- Mali
- Zambia

Promotions

- Gabon and Mauritius qualify for the 2025 Africa Zone Group IV
