= 2022 Davis Cup Africa Zone Group IV =

Group IV Davis Cup competition in 2022 in Africa

The Africa Zone was the unique zone within Group 4 of the regional Davis Cup competition in 2022. The zone's competition was held in round robin format in Kigali, Rwanda, from 5 to 9 July 2022 and in Yaoundé, Cameroon, from 27 to 30 July 2022.

== Participating nations ==
- Angola
- Botswana
- Burundi
- Cameroon
- Congo
- DR Congo
- Ethiopia
- Gabon
- Ghana
- Mauritius
- Nigeria
- Rwanda
- Senegal
- Sudan
- Tanzania
- Togo
- Uganda

=== Inactive nations ===
- Burkina Faso
- Djibouti
- Lesotho
- Libya
- Mali
- Zambia

== Draw ==
Date: 4–9 July 2022 and 27–30 July 2022

Location: Ecology Tennis Club, Kigali, Rwanda (clay) and MUNDI Sport Complex, Yaoundé, Cameroon (hard)

Format: Round-robin basis. In Kigali, one pool of four teams and one pool of five teams. The winners of each pool will play-off against each other to determine the nation promoted to Africa Group III in 2023. In Yaoundé, two pools of four teams. The winners of each pool will play-off against each other to determine the other nation promoted to Africa Group III in 2023.

=== Seeding ===
Kigali

Pot	Nation	Rank^{1}	Seed
1	Rwanda	100	1
1	Botswana	108	2
2	Uganda	121	3
2	Angola	124	4
3	Congo	131	5
3	DR Congo	NR	–
3	Sudan	NR	–
3	Tanzania	NR	–
3	Togo	NR	–

- ^{1}Davis Cup Rankings as of 8 March 2022

Yaoundé

Pot	Nation	Rank^{1}	Seed
1	Nigeria	102	1
1	Cameroon	103	2
2	Ghana	110	3
2	Gabon	122	4
3	Senegal	124	5
3	Burundi	NR	–
3	Ethiopia	NR	–
3	Mauritius	NR	–

- ^{1}Davis Cup Rankings as of 8 March 2022

=== Round Robin ===
==== Pool A (Kigali) ====
		RWA	SUD	TAN	UGA	RR; W–L	Set; W–L	Game; W–L	Standings
1	Rwanda		3–0	3–0	3–0	3–0	18–1 (95%)	112–39 (74%)	1
–	Sudan	0–3		2–1	3–0	2–1	11–9 (55%)	94–83 (53%)	2
–	Tanzania	0–3	1–2		2–1	1–2	7–12 (37%)	63–88 (42%)	3
3	Uganda	0–3	0–3	1–2		0–3	2–16 (11%)	41–100 (29%)	4

==== Pool B (Kigali) ====
		TOG	COD	BOT	ANG	CGO	RR; W–L	Set; W–L	Game; W–L	Standings
–	Togo		2–1	3–0	3–0	3–0	4–0	23–2 (92%)	147–66 (69%)	1
–	DR Congo	1–2		3–0	3–0	3–0	3–1	20–5 (80%)	146–73 (67%)	2
2	Botswana	0–3	0–3		2–1	2–1	2–2	8–17 (32%)	81–126 (39%)	3
4	Angola	0–3	0–3	1–2		2–1	1–3	8–18 (31%)	86–126 (41%)	4
–	Congo	0–3	0–3	1–2	1–2		0–4	4–21 (16%)	70–139 (33%)	5

==== Pool A (Yaoundé) ====
		BDI	NGR	GAB	MRI	RR; W–L	Set; W–L	Game; W–L	Standings
–	Burundi		2–1	3–0	1–2	2–1	12–7 (63%)	93–70 (57%)	1
1	Nigeria	1–2		3–0	3–0	2–1	15–5 (75%)	106–79 (57%)	2
4	Gabon	0–3	0–3		2–1	1–2	5–15 (25%)	83–111 (43%)	3
–	Mauritius	2–1	0–3	1–2		1–2	7–12 (37%)	78–100 (44%)	4

==== Pool B (Yaoundé) ====
		SEN	GHA	CMR	ETH	RR; W–L	Set; W–L	Game; W–L	Standings
5	Senegal		2–1	2–1	3–0	3–0	15–7 (68%)	113–71 (61%)	1
3	Ghana	1–2		2–1	3–0	2–1	13–6 (68%)	100–76 (57%)	2
2	Cameroon	1–2	1–2		3–0	1–2	11–9 (55%)	95–94 (50%)	3
–	Ethiopia	0–3	0–3	0–3		0–3	1–18 (5%)	45–112 (29%)	4

Standings are determined by: 1. number of wins; 2. number of matches; 3. in two-team ties, head-to-head records; 4. in three-team ties, (a) percentage of sets won (head-to-head records if two teams remain tied), then (b) percentage of games won (head-to-head records if two teams remain tied), then (c) Davis Cup rankings.

=== Playoffs ===
Placing (Kigali)	A Team	Score	B Team
Promotion	Rwanda	0–3	Togo
3rd–4th	Sudan	0–3	DR Congo
5th–6th	Tanzania	2–1	Botswana
7th–8th	Uganda	0–3	Angola
9th	—		Congo

Placing (Yaoundé)	A Team	Score	B Team
Promotion	Burundi	1–2	Senegal
3rd–4th	Nigeria	0–2	Ghana
5th–6th	Gabon	0–2	Cameroon
7th–8th	Mauritius	2–1	Ethiopia

- Togo and Senegal are promoted to Africa Group III in 2023.

== Round Robin ==
=== Pool A (Kigali) ===
==== Rwanda vs. Uganda ====
Rwanda
3
Ecology Tennis Club, Kigali, Rwanda
4 July 2022
Clay

Uganda
0

			1	2	3
1	(Rwanda) (Uganda)	Ernest Habiyambere; Wakoli Nasawali Ronald	6; 0	6; 0
2	(Rwanda) (Uganda)	Bertin Karenzi; Godfrey Ocen	6; 0	6; 0
3	(Rwanda) (Uganda)	Bertin Karenzi / Étienne Niyigena; Joel Mwisukye / Godfrey Ocen	6; 2	6; 0

==== Sudan vs. Tanzania ====
Sudan
2
Ecology Tennis Club, Kigali, Rwanda
4 July 2022
Clay

Tanzania
1

			1	2	3
1	(Sudan) (Tanzania)	Khalid Derar; Yusuph Godwin	6; 1	6; 2
2	(Sudan) (Tanzania)	Mohamed Abdalla; Frank Mshanga	4; 6	0; 6
3	(Sudan) (Tanzania)	Khalid Derar / Noor Mandour; Frank Mshanga / Abubakari Risasi	2; 6	6; 1	6; 4

==== Rwanda vs. Tanzania ====
Rwanda
3
Ecology Tennis Club, Kigali, Rwanda
6 July 2022
Clay

Tanzania
0

			1	2	3
1	(Rwanda) (Tanzania)	Ernest Habiyambere; Omari Hamis Sulle	6; 2	6; 2
2	(Rwanda) (Tanzania)	Bertin Karenzi; Frank Mshanga	6; 4	6; 0
3	(Rwanda) (Tanzania)	Junior Hakizumwami / Étienne Niyigena; Rahim Rashidi / Abubakari Risasi	6; 2	6; 0

==== Uganda vs. Sudan ====
Uganda
0
Ecology Tennis Club, Kigali, Rwanda
6 July 2022
Clay

Sudan
3

			1	2	3
1	(Uganda) (Sudan)	Joel Mwisukye; Noor Mandour	3; 6	1; 6
2	(Uganda) (Sudan)	Godfrey Ocen; Khalid Derar	2; 6	1; 6
3	(Uganda) (Sudan)	Edward Birungi / Wakoli Nasawali Ronald; Mohamed Abdalla / Noor Mandour	4; 6	6^{4} 7^{7}

==== Rwanda vs. Sudan ====
Rwanda
3
Ecology Tennis Club, Kigali, Rwanda
8 July 2022
Clay

Sudan
0

			1	2	3
1	(Rwanda) (Sudan)	Ernest Habiyambere; Noor Mandour	6; 2	6; 3
2	(Rwanda) (Sudan)	Bertin Karenzi; Khalid Derar	6; 4	7^{8} 6^{6}
3	(Rwanda) (Sudan)	Junior Hakizumwami / Joshua Muhire; Mohamed Abdalla / Noor Mandour	3; 6	6; 3	6; 3

==== Uganda vs. Tanzania ====
Uganda
1
Ecology Tennis Club, Kigali, Rwanda
8 July 2022
Clay

Tanzania
2

			1	2	3
1	(Uganda) (Tanzania)	Wakoli Nasawali Ronald; Abubakari Risasi	6; 0	6; 2
2	(Uganda) (Tanzania)	Godfrey Ocen; Frank Mshanga	2; 6	5; 7
3	(Uganda) (Tanzania)	Edward Birungi / Joel Mwisukye; Frank Mshanga / Omari Hamis Sulle	2; 6	1; 6

=== Pool B (Kigali) ===
==== Botswana vs. DR Congo ====
Botswana
0
Ecology Tennis Club, Kigali, Rwanda
4 July 2022
Clay

DR Congo
3

			1	2	3
1	(Botswana) (Democratic Republic of the Congo)	Lefa Ashley Sibanda; Christian Saidi	2; 6	1; 6
2	(Botswana) (Democratic Republic of the Congo)	Denzel Seetso; William Bushamuka	3; 6	0; 6
3	(Botswana) (Democratic Republic of the Congo)	Thato Holmes / Tshepo Mosarwa; William Bushamuka / Arnold Ikondo Moke	3; 6	4; 6

==== Angola vs. Togo ====
Angola
0
Ecology Tennis Club, Kigali, Rwanda
4 July 2022
Clay

Togo
3

			1	2	3
1	(Angola) (Togo)	Fernando André; Komlavi Loglo	3; 6	4; 6
2	(Angola) (Togo)	Zidario Quitomina; Thomas Setodji	2; 6	3; 6
3	(Angola) (Togo)	João Neves / Cleuson Tipewa; Liova Ayite Ajavon / M'lapa Tingou Akomlo	0; 6	1; 6

==== Angola vs. DR Congo ====
Angola
0
Ecology Tennis Club, Kigali, Rwanda
5 July 2022
Clay

DR Congo
3

			1	2	3
1	(Angola) (Democratic Republic of the Congo)	Cleuson Tipewa; Christian Saidi	2; 6	0; 6
2	(Angola) (Democratic Republic of the Congo)	Zidario Quitomina; William Bushamuka	2; 6	1; 6
3	(Angola) (Democratic Republic of the Congo)	Fernando André / João Neves; Bienvenu Bolangi / William Bushamuka	2; 6	2; 6

==== Congo vs. Togo ====
Congo
0
Ecology Tennis Club, Kigali, Rwanda
5 July 2022
Clay

Togo
3

			1	2	3
1	(Republic of the Congo) (Togo)	Duhamel Franklin Biboussy; Komlavi Loglo	0; 6	2; 6
2	(Republic of the Congo) (Togo)	Armel Mokobo; Thomas Setodji	0; 6	0; 6
3	(Republic of the Congo) (Togo)	Paterne Mamata / Armel Mokobo; M'lapa Tingou Akomlo / Hod'abalo Isak Padio	1; 6	4; 6

==== Botswana vs. Angola ====
Botswana
2
Ecology Tennis Club, Kigali, Rwanda
6 July 2022
Clay

Angola
1

			1	2	3
1	(Botswana) (Angola)	Tshepo Mosarwa; Fernando André	0; 6	0; 2		retired
2	(Botswana) (Angola)	Denzel Seetso; Zidario Quitomina	6; 0	6; 1
3	(Botswana) (Angola)	Thato Holmes / Lefa Ashley Sibanda; Fernando André / Zidario Quitomina	7^{8} 6^{6}	3; 6	6; 4

==== Congo vs. DR Congo ====
Congo
0
Ecology Tennis Club, Kigali, Rwanda
6 July 2022
Clay

DR Congo
3

			1	2	3
1	(Republic of the Congo) (Democratic Republic of the Congo)	Duhamel Franklin Biboussy; Christian Saidi	1; 6	0; 6
2	(Republic of the Congo) (Democratic Republic of the Congo)	Paterne Mamata; William Bushamuka	6^{5} 7^{7}	3; 6
3	(Republic of the Congo) (Democratic Republic of the Congo)	Paterne Mamata / Armel Mokobo; William Bushamuka / Christian Saidi	1; 6	1; 6

==== Botswana vs. Togo ====
Botswana
0
Ecology Tennis Club, Kigali, Rwanda
7 July 2022
Clay

Togo
3

			1	2	3
1	(Botswana) (Togo)	Lefa Ashley Sibanda; Liova Ayite Ajavon	2; 6	0; 6
2	(Botswana) (Togo)	Denzel Seetso; Thomas Setodji	1; 6	1; 6
3	(Botswana) (Togo)	Thato Holmes / Tshepo Mosarwa; Komlavi Loglo / Thomas Setodji	1; 6	4; 6

==== Angola vs. Congo ====
Angola
2
Ecology Tennis Club, Kigali, Rwanda
7 July 2022
Clay

Congo
1

			1	2	3
1	(Angola) (Republic of the Congo)	Cleuson Tipewa; Michael Bolidard Ibakakomboyo-Ayessa	6; 1	6; 1
2	(Angola) (Republic of the Congo)	Fernando André; Paterne Mamata	7^{7} 6^{1}	3; 6	0; 6
3	(Angola) (Republic of the Congo)	Fernando André / João Neves; Paterne Mamata / Armel Mokobo	7; 5	6; 1

==== Botswana vs. Congo ====
Botswana
2
Ecology Tennis Club, Kigali, Rwanda
8 July 2022
Clay

Congo
1

			1	2	3
1	(Botswana) (Republic of the Congo)	Thato Holmes; Armel Mokobo	6; 1	6; 3
2	(Botswana) (Republic of the Congo)	Tshepo Mosarwa; Paterne Mamata	4; 6	2; 6
3	(Botswana) (Republic of the Congo)	Thato Holmes / Lefa Ashley Sibanda; Paterne Mamata / Armel Mokobo	6; 3	7^{7} 6^{1}

==== Togo vs. DR Congo ====
Togo
2
Ecology Tennis Club, Kigali, Rwanda
8 July 2022
Clay

DR Congo
1

			1	2	3
1	(Togo) (Democratic Republic of the Congo)	Komlavi Loglo; Christian Saidi	7^{7} 6^{3}	7^{8} 6^{6}
2	(Togo) (Democratic Republic of the Congo)	Thomas Setodji; William Bushamuka	3; 6	7^{7} 6^{5}	3; 6
3	(Togo) (Democratic Republic of the Congo)	Komlavi Loglo / Thomas Setodji; William Bushamuka / Christian Saidi	6; 3	6; 4

=== Pool A (Yaoundé) ===
==== Nigeria vs. Mauritius ====
Nigeria
3
MUNDI Sport Complex, Yaoundé, Cameroon
27 July 2022
Hard

Mauritius
0

			1	2	3
1	(Nigeria) (Mauritius)	Nonso Madueke; Jake Lam Hau Ching	6; 4	6; 4
2	(Nigeria) (Mauritius)	Wilson Oswalele Igbinovia; Lucas Alexander Lai Fat Fur	6; 1	6; 2
3	(Nigeria) (Mauritius)	Nonso Madueke / Abayomi Oluseyi Philips; Lucas Alexander Lai Fat Fur / Ryan Chee Tat Wong Pin Young	7^{7} 6^{3}	7; 5

==== Gabon vs. Burundi ====
Gabon
0
MUNDI Sport Complex, Yaoundé, Cameroon
27 July 2022
Hard

Burundi
3

			1	2	3
1	(Gabon) (Burundi)	Willy Lebendje; Allan Gatoto	5; 7	2; 6
2	(Gabon) (Burundi)	Lyold Obiang Ondo; Guy Orly Iradukunda	3; 6	2; 6
3	(Gabon) (Burundi)	Willy Lebendje / Lyold Obiang Ondo; Allan Gatoto / Guy Orly Iradukunda	5; 7	2; 6

==== Nigeria vs. Burundi ====
Nigeria
1
MUNDI Sport Complex, Yaoundé, Cameroon
28 July 2022
Hard

Burundi
2

			1	2	3
1	(Nigeria) (Burundi)	Nonso Madueke; Allan Gatoto	6; 3	6; 2
2	(Nigeria) (Burundi)	Wilson Oswalele Igbinovia; Guy Orly Iradukunda	2; 6	2; 6
3	(Nigeria) (Burundi)	Wilson Oswalele Igbinovia / Abayomi Oluseyi Philips; Allan Gatoto / Guy Orly Iradukunda	1; 6	6; 4	4; 6

==== Gabon vs. Mauritius ====
Gabon
2
MUNDI Sport Complex, Yaoundé, Cameroon
28 July 2022
Hard

Mauritius
1

			1	2	3
1	(Gabon) (Mauritius)	Willy Lebendje; Ryan Chee Tat Wong Pin Young	5; 7	4; 6
2	(Gabon) (Mauritius)	Lyold Obiang Ondo; Lucas Alexander Lai Fat Fur	7; 5	6; 4
3	(Gabon) (Mauritius)	Willy Lebendje / Lyold Obiang Ondo; Łukasz Skowroński / Ryan Chee Tat Wong Pin Young	6; 0	6^{4} 7^{7}	6; 3

==== Nigeria vs. Gabon ====
Nigeria
3
MUNDI Sport Complex, Yaoundé, Cameroon
29 July 2022
Hard

Gabon
0

			1	2	3
1	(Nigeria) (Gabon)	Abayomi Oluseyi Philips; Willy Lebendje	7; 5	7; 5
2	(Nigeria) (Gabon)	Wilson Oswalele Igbinovia; Lyold Obiang Ondo	3; 6	6; 1	6; 1
3	(Nigeria) (Gabon)	Wilson Oswalele Igbinovia / Nonso Madueke; Willy Lebendje / Lyold Obiang Ondo	6; 2	6; 4

==== Burundi vs. Mauritius ====
Burundi
1
MUNDI Sport Complex, Yaoundé, Cameroon
29 July 2022
Hard

Mauritius
2

			1	2	3
1	(Burundi) (Mauritius)	Abdoul Shakur Malick; Łukasz Skowroński	4; 6	1; 6
2	(Burundi) (Mauritius)	Guy Orly Iradukunda; Lucas Alexander Lai Fat Fur	6; 0	6; 0
3	(Burundi) (Mauritius)	Guy Orly Iradukunda / Moussa Kashindi; Łukasz Skowroński / Ryan Chee Tat Wong Pin Young	3; 6	2; 6

=== Pool B (Yaoundé) ===
==== Cameroon vs. Senegal ====
Cameroon
1
MUNDI Sport Complex, Yaoundé, Cameroon
27 July 2022
Hard

Senegal
2

			1	2	3
1	(Cameroon) (Senegal)	Lloyd Sergio Watat Njanga; Nicolas Jadoun	2; 6	2; 6
2	(Cameroon) (Senegal)	Étienne Teboh; Seydina André	7^{7} 6^{3}	3; 6	1; 6
3	(Cameroon) (Senegal)	Boriss Kamdem / Lloyd Sergio Watat Njanga; Nicolas Jadoun / Yannick Languina	3; 6	6; 3	6; 4

==== Ghana vs. Ethiopia ====
Ghana
3
MUNDI Sport Complex, Yaoundé, Cameroon
27 July 2022
Hard

Ethiopia
0

			1	2	3
1	(Ghana) (Ethiopia)	Samuel Agbesi Osei Antwi; Abdella Nedim Mohammed	6; 1	6; 1
2	(Ghana) (Ethiopia)	Isaac Nortey; Yabets Kebede	6; 3	6; 4
3	(Ghana) (Ethiopia)	Johnson Acquah / Isaac Nortey; Teame Gebresilase / Abdella Nedim Mohammed	6; 4	6; 4

==== Cameroon vs. Ethiopia ====
Cameroon
3
MUNDI Sport Complex, Yaoundé, Cameroon
28 July 2022
Hard

Ethiopia
0

			1	2	3
1	(Cameroon) (Ethiopia)	Okala Hagoua Valentin Brayan Alexis; Teame Gebresilase	6; 3	6; 2
2	(Cameroon) (Ethiopia)	Étienne Teboh; Yabets Kebede	6; 0	6; 2
3	(Cameroon) (Ethiopia)	Okala Hagoua Valentin Brayan Alexis / Boriss Kamdem; Teame Gebresilase / Abdella Nedim Mohammed	6; 2	7^{7} 6^{5}

==== Ghana vs. Senegal ====
Ghana
1
MUNDI Sport Complex, Yaoundé, Cameroon
28 July 2022
Hard

Senegal
2

			1	2	3
1	(Ghana) (Senegal)	Samuel Agbesi Osei Antwi; Nicolas Jadoun	3; 6	1; 6
2	(Ghana) (Senegal)	Isaac Nortey; Seydina André	6; 2	3; 6	3; 6
3	(Ghana) (Senegal)	Johnson Acquah / Isaac Nortey; Hassimiyou Dieng / Yannick Languina	6; 3	6; 2

==== Cameroon vs. Ghana ====
Cameroon
1
MUNDI Sport Complex, Yaoundé, Cameroon
29 July 2022
Hard

Ghana
2

			1	2	3
1	(Cameroon) (Ghana)	Lloyd Sergio Watat Njanga; Samuel Agbesi Osei Antwi	2; 6	2; 6
2	(Cameroon) (Ghana)	Étienne Teboh; Isaac Nortey	5; 7	6^{4} 7^{7}
3	(Cameroon) (Ghana)	Okala Hagoua Valentin Brayan Alexis / Boriss Kamdem; Johnson Acquah / Reginald Nii Okai Okantey	6; 4	7^{7} 6^{5}

==== Ethiopia vs. Senegal ====
Ethiopia
0
MUNDI Sport Complex, Yaoundé, Cameroon
29 July 2022
Hard

Senegal
3

			1	2	3
1	(Ethiopia) (Senegal)	Zekarias Tegenu; Yannick Languina	2; 6	0; 6
2	(Ethiopia) (Senegal)	Abdella Nedim Mohammed; Nicolas Jadoun	1; 6	1; 6
3	(Ethiopia) (Senegal)	Teame Gebresilase / Abdella Nedim Mohammed; Hassimiyou Dieng / Yannick Languina	1; 6	6; 3	2; 6

== Play-offs ==
=== Promotion play-off ===
==== Rwanda vs. Togo ====
Rwanda
0
Ecology Tennis Club, Kigali, Rwanda
9 July 2022
Clay

Togo
3

			1	2	3
1	(Rwanda) (Togo)	Étienne Niyigena; Liova Ayite Ajavon	3; 6	4; 6
2	(Rwanda) (Togo)	Ernest Habiyambere; Thomas Setodji	0; 6	2; 6
3	(Rwanda) (Togo)	Ernest Habiyambere / Étienne Niyigena; M'lapa Tingou Akomlo / Hod'abalo Isak Padio	6^{5} 7^{7}	2; 6

==== Burundi vs. Senegal ====
Burundi
1
MUNDI Sport Complex, Yaoundé, Cameroon
30 July 2022
Hard

Senegal
2

			1	2	3
1	(Burundi) (Senegal)	Allan Gatoto; Nicolas Jadoun	0; 6	0; 6
2	(Burundi) (Senegal)	Guy Orly Iradukunda; Seydina André	6; 3	6; 2
3	(Burundi) (Senegal)	Allan Gatoto / Guy Orly Iradukunda; Seydina André / Nicolas Jadoun	4; 6	2; 6

=== 3rd place play-off ===
==== Sudan vs. DR Congo ====
Sudan
0
Ecology Tennis Club, Kigali, Rwanda
9 July 2022
Clay

DR Congo
3

			1	2	3
1	(Sudan) (Democratic Republic of the Congo)	Noor Mandour; Arnold Ikondo Moke	0; 6	0; 6
2	(Sudan) (Democratic Republic of the Congo)	Khalid Derar; Bienvenu Bolangi	4; 6	7^{7} 6^{5}	3; 6
3	(Sudan) (Democratic Republic of the Congo)	Mohamed Abdalla / Noor Mandour; Bienvenu Bolangi / Arnold Ikondo Moke	2; 6	1; 6

==== Nigeria vs. Ghana ====
Nigeria
0
MUNDI Sport Complex, Yaoundé, Cameroon
30 July 2022
Hard

Ghana
2

			1	2	3
1	(Nigeria) (Ghana)	Nonso Madueke; Samuel Agbesi Osei Antwi	1; 6	2; 6
2	(Nigeria) (Ghana)	Wilson Oswalele Igbinovia; Isaac Nortey	3; 6	2; 6
3	(Nigeria) (Ghana)	Nonso Madueke / Abayomi Oluseyi Philips; Johnson Acquah / Reginald Nii Okai Okantey				not played

=== 5th place play-off ===
==== Tanzania vs. Botswana ====
Tanzania
2
Ecology Tennis Club, Kigali, Rwanda
9 July 2022
Clay

Botswana
1

			1	2	3
1	(Tanzania) (Botswana)	Omari Hamis Sulle; Thato Holmes	4; 6	7; 5	3; 6
2	(Tanzania) (Botswana)	Frank Mshanga; Lefa Ashley Sibanda	6; 2	6; 4
3	(Tanzania) (Botswana)	Frank Mshanga / Omari Hamis Sulle; Thato Holmes / Lefa Ashley Sibanda	6; 3	6; 3

==== Gabon vs. Cameroon ====
Gabon
0
MUNDI Sport Complex, Yaoundé, Cameroon
30 July 2022
Hard

Cameroon
2

			1	2	3
1	(Gabon) (Cameroon)	Willy Lebendje; Cliford Wuyum Nkwain	0; 6	1; 6
2	(Gabon) (Cameroon)	Lyold Obiang Ondo; Boriss Kamdem	6^{2} 7^{7}	3; 6
3	(Gabon) (Cameroon)	Willy Lebendje / Lyold Obiang Ondo; Okala Hagoua Valentin Brayan Alexis / Lloyd Sergio Watat Njanga				not played

=== 7th place play-off ===
==== Angola vs. Uganda ====
Angola
3
Ecology Tennis Club, Kigali, Rwanda
9 July 2022
Clay

Uganda
0

			1	2	3
1	(Angola) (Uganda)	João Neves; Wakoli Nasawali Ronald	6; 3	7; 5
2	(Angola) (Uganda)	Zidario Quitomina; Joel Mwisukye	6; 4	6; 3
3	(Angola) (Uganda)	Fernando André / Cleuson Tipewa; Wakoli Nasawali Ronald / Godfrey Ocen	6; 3	4; 6	[10] [2]

==== Mauritius vs. Ethiopia ====
Mauritius
2
MUNDI Sport Complex, Yaoundé, Cameroon
30 July 2022
Hard

Ethiopia
1

			1	2	3
1	(Mauritius) (Ethiopia)	Jake Lam Hau Ching; Abdella Nedim Mohammed	6; 4	4; 6	6; 3
2	(Mauritius) (Ethiopia)	Lucas Alexander Lai Fat Fur; Yabets Kebede	1; 6	5; 7
3	(Mauritius) (Ethiopia)	Łukasz Skowroński / Ryan Chee Tat Wong Pin Young; Teame Gebresilase / Abdella Nedim Mohammed	6; 4	7^{7} 6^{5}
