= 2024 Davis Cup Africa Zone Group IV =

Davis Cup competition in 2024

The Africa Zone was the unique zone within Group 4 of the regional Davis Cup competition in 2024. The zone's competition was held in round robin format in Luanda, Angola from 19 to 22 June 2024.

== Participating nations ==
- Algeria
- Angola
- Burundi
- Cameroon
- DR Congo
- Kenya
- Rwanda
- Senegal

== Draw ==
Date: 19–22 June 2024

Location: Academia de Tenis Kikuxi Villas Club, Luanda, Angola (Hard)

Format: Round-robin basis. Two pools of four teams and nations will play each team once in their pool. Nations finishing in the top two of each pool will enter promotional play-offs, with the first of Pool A facing the second of Pool B and the first of Pool B facing the second of Pool A, and the two winners will be promoted to Africa Zone Group III in 2025.

Nations finishing in the bottom two of each pool will enter relegation play-offs, with the third of Pool A facing the fourth of Pool B and the third of Pool B facing the fourth of Pool A, and the two lost teams will be relegated to Africa Zone Group V in 2025.

=== Seeding ===
Pot	Nation	Rank^{1}	Seed
1	Algeria	101	1
1	Rwanda	105	2
2	Senegal	106	3
2	Kenya	108	4
3	Cameroon	110	5
3	DR Congo	112	6
4	Angola	115	7
4	Burundi	119	8

- ^{1}Davis Cup Rankings as of

=== Round Robin ===
==== Pool A ====
		SEN	ALG	ANG	CMR	RR; W–L	Set; W–L	Game; W–L	Standings
3	Senegal		3–0	2–1	2–1	3–0	7–2 (%)	– (%)	1
1	Algeria	0–3		3–0	3–0	2–1	6–3 (%)	– (%)	2
7	Angola	1–2	0–3		2–1	1–2	3–6 (%)	– (%)	3
5	Cameroon	1–2	0–3	1–2		0–3	2–7 (%)	– (%)	4

==== Pool B ====
		BDI	COD	KEN	RWA	RR; W–L	Set; W–L	Game; W–L	Standings
8	Burundi		2–1	2–1	3–0	3–0	7–2 (%)	– (%)	1
6	DR Congo	1–2		2–1	2–1	2–1	5–4 (%)	– (%)	2
4	Kenya	1–2	1–2		3–0	1–2	5–4 (%)	– (%)	3
2	Rwanda	0–3	1–2	0–3		0–3	1–8 (%)	– (%)	4

Standings are determined by: 1. number of wins; 2. number of matches; 3. in two-team ties, head-to-head records; 4. in three-team ties, (a) percentage of sets won (head-to-head records if two teams remain tied), then (b) percentage of games won (head-to-head records if two teams remain tied), then (c) Davis Cup rankings.

=== Playoffs ===
Placing	A Team	Score	B Team
Promotional	Senegal	2–0	DR Congo
Promotional	Burundi	1–2	Algeria
Relegation	Angola	2–1	Rwanda
Relegation	Kenya	2–1	Cameroon

- Algeria and Senegal were promoted to 2025 Davis Cup Africa Zone Group III.
- Cameroon and Rwanda were relegated to 2025 Davis Cup Africa Zone Group V.

== Round Robin ==
=== Pool A ===
==== Algeria vs. Angola ====
Algeria
3
Academia de Tenis Kikuxi Villas Club, Luanda, Angola
19 June 2024
Hard

Angola
0

			1	2	3
1	(Algeria) (Angola)	Youcef Rihane; Felix Andre	6; 3	6; 4
2	(Algeria) (Angola)	Toufik Sahtali; Daniel Domingos	6; 1	7; 5
3	(Algeria) (Angola)	Aymen Abderrahmene Ali Moussa / Youcef Rihane; Chris Lukanu Andre / Fernando Andre	6; 1	6; 2

==== Senegal vs. Cameroon ====
Senegal
2
Academia de Tenis Kikuxi Villas Club, Luanda, Angola
19 June 2024
Hard

Cameroon
1

			1	2	3
1	(Senegal) (Cameroon)	Nicolas Jadoun; Okala Hagoua Valentin Brayan Alexis	6; 3	6; 3
2	(Senegal) (Cameroon)	Seydina Andre; Étienne Teboh	6; 3	6; 4
3	(Senegal) (Cameroon)	Hassimiyou Dieng / Yannick Languina; Boriss Kamdem / Étienne Teboh	3; 6	3; 6

==== Algeria vs. Cameroon ====
Algeria
3
Academia de Tenis Kikuxi Villas Club, Luanda, Angola
20 June 2024
Hard

Cameroon
0

			1	2	3
1	(Algeria) (Cameroon)	Youcef Rihane; Boriss Kamdem	6; 0	6; 1
2	(Algeria) (Cameroon)	Toufik Sahtali; Étienne Teboh	6; 0	6; 2
3	(Algeria) (Cameroon)	Youcef Rihane / Toufik Sahtali; Okala Hagoua Valentin Brayan Alexis / Boriss Kamdem	6; 0	6; 1

==== Senegal vs. Angola ====
Senegal
2
Academia de Tenis Kikuxi Villas Club, Luanda, Angola
20 June 2024
Hard

Angola
1

			1	2	3
1	(Senegal) (Angola)	Nicolas Jadoun; Chris Lukanu Andre	6; 2	6; 2
2	(Senegal) (Angola)	Seydina Andre; Emerson Pedro	6; 2	6; 0
3	(Senegal) (Angola)	Hassimiyou Dieng / Yannick Languina; Felix Andre / Fernando Andre	2; 6	6; 3	4; 6

==== Algeria vs. Senegal ====
Algeria
0
Academia de Tenis Kikuxi Villas Club, Luanda, Angola
21 June 2024
Hard

Senegal
3

			1	2	3
1	(Algeria) (Senegal)	Youcef Rihane; Nicolas Jadoun	6^{8} 7^{10}	7^{7} 6^{5}	2; 6
2	(Algeria) (Senegal)	Toufik Sahtali; Seydina Andre	1; 6	6^{1} 7^{7}
3	(Algeria) (Senegal)	Aymen Abderrahmene Ali Moussa / Kamyl Chebboub; Hassimiyou Dieng / Yannick Languina	1; 6	3; 6

==== Cameroon vs. Angola ====
Cameroon
1
Academia de Tenis Kikuxi Villas Club, Luanda, Angola
21 June 2024
Hard

Angola
2

			1	2	3
1	(Cameroon) (Angola)	Okala Hagoua Valentin Brayan Alexis; Chris Lukanu Andre	6; 0	3; 6	6; 1
2	(Cameroon) (Angola)	Étienne Teboh; Felix Andre	3; 6	6; 3	3; 6
3	(Cameroon) (Angola)	Okala Hagoua Valentin Brayan Alexis / Boriss Kamdem; Felix Andre / Fernando Andre	4; 6	6; 3	1; 6

=== Pool B ===
==== Rwanda vs. Burundi ====
Rwanda
0
Academia de Tenis Kikuxi Villas Club, Luanda, Angola
19 June 2024
Hard

Burundi
3

			1	2	3
1	(Rwanda) (Burundi)	Junior Hakizumwami; Allan Gatoto	0; 6	0; 6
2	(Rwanda) (Burundi)	Etienne Niyigena; Guy Orly Iradukunda	0; 6	1; 6
3	(Rwanda) (Burundi)	Ernest Habiyambere / Joshua Muhire; Allan Gatoto / Hassan Ndayishimiye	2; 6	2; 6

==== Kenya vs. DR Congo ====
Kenya
1
Academia de Tenis Kikuxi Villas Club, Luanda, Angola
19 June 2024
Hard

DR Congo
2

			1	2	3
1	(Kenya) (Democratic Republic of the Congo)	Kael Shalin Shah; Christian Saidi	6; 3	7^{7} 6^{4}
2	(Kenya) (Democratic Republic of the Congo)	Ibrahim Kibet Yego; William Bushamuka	1; 6	3; 6
3	(Kenya) (Democratic Republic of the Congo)	Keean Shah / Ibrahim Kibet Yego; Bienvenu Bolangi / William Bushamuka	6^{2} 7^{7}	7^{7} 6^{4}	1; 6

==== Rwanda vs. DR Congo ====
Rwanda
1
Academia de Tenis Kikuxi Villas Club, Luanda, Angola
20 June 2024
Hard

DR Congo
2

			1	2	3
1	(Rwanda) (Democratic Republic of the Congo)	Ernest Habiyambere; Christian Saidi	2; 6	1; 6
2	(Rwanda) (Democratic Republic of the Congo)	Etienne Niyigena; William Bushamuka	2; 6	0; 6
3	(Rwanda) (Democratic Republic of the Congo)	Joshua Muhire / Etienne Niyigena; Isaac Bokungu Lokalemela / Bienvenu Bolangi	6; 3	6^{7} 7^{9}	6; 3

==== Kenya vs. Burundi ====
Kenya
1
Academia de Tenis Kikuxi Villas Club, Luanda, Angola
20 June 2024
Hard

Burundi
2

			1	2	3
1	(Kenya) (Burundi)	Albert Njogu; Allan Gatoto	4; 6	3; 6
2	(Kenya) (Burundi)	Kael Shalin Shah; Guy Orly Iradukunda	7^{7} 6^{4}	4; 6	6; 1
3	(Kenya) (Burundi)	Derick Ominde / Keean Shah; Allan Gatoto / Guy Orly Iradukunda	1; 6	2; 6

==== Rwanda vs. Kenya ====
Rwanda
0
Academia de Tenis Kikuxi Villas Club, Luanda, Angola
21 June 2024
Hard

Kenya
3

			1	2	3
1	(Rwanda) (Kenya)	Ernest Habiyambere; Albert Njogu	4; 6	6; 3	4; 6
2	(Rwanda) (Kenya)	Junior Hakizumwami; Kael Shalin Shah	4; 6	1; 6
3	(Rwanda) (Kenya)	Joshua Muhire / Etienne Niyigena; Keean Shah / Ibrahim Kibet Yego	0; 6	4; 6

==== DR Congo vs. Burundi ====
DR Congo
1
Academia de Tenis Kikuxi Villas Club, Luanda, Angola
21 June 2024
Hard

Burundi
2

			1	2	3
1	(Democratic Republic of the Congo) (Burundi)	Christian Saidi; Hassan Ndayishimiye	6; 4	6; 4
2	(Democratic Republic of the Congo) (Burundi)	William Bushamuka; Allan Gatoto	6; 2	6^{6} 7^{8}	4; 6
3	(Democratic Republic of the Congo) (Burundi)	Bienvenu Bolangi / William Bushamuka; Allan Gatoto / Guy Orly Iradukunda	3; 6	2; 6

== Play-offs ==
=== Promotional play-offs ===
==== Senegal vs. DR Congo ====
Senegal
2
Academia de Tenis Kikuxi Villas Club, Luanda, Angola
22 June 2024
Hard

DR Congo
0

			1	2	3
1	(Senegal) (Democratic Republic of the Congo)	Nicolas Jadoun; Christian Saidi	6; 2	6; 1
2	(Senegal) (Democratic Republic of the Congo)	Seydina Andre; William Bushamuka	6; 2	6^{2} 7^{7}	6; 3
3	(Senegal) (Democratic Republic of the Congo)	Hassimiyou Dieng / Yannick Languina; William Bushamuka / Christian Saidi				not played

==== Burundi vs. Algeria ====
Burundi
1
Academia de Tenis Kikuxi Villas Club, Luanda, Angola
22 June 2024
Hard

Algeria
2

			1	2	3
1	(Burundi) (Algeria)	Allan Gatoto; Youcef Rihane	1; 6	1; 6
2	(Burundi) (Algeria)	Guy Orly Iradukunda; Toufik Sahtali	6; 1	6; 2
3	(Burundi) (Algeria)	Allan Gatoto / Guy Orly Iradukunda; Youcef Rihane / Toufik Sahtali	1; 6	5; 7

=== Relegation play-offs ===
==== Angola vs. Rwanda ====
Angola
2
Academia de Tenis Kikuxi Villas Club, Luanda, Angola
22 June 2024
Hard

Rwanda
1

			1	2	3
1	(Angola) (Rwanda)	Fernando Andre; Ernest Habiyambere	3; 6	4; 6
2	(Angola) (Rwanda)	Daniel Domingos; Junior Hakizumwami	6; 2	6; 2
3	(Angola) (Rwanda)	Chris Lukanu Andre / Felix Andre; Ernest Habiyambere / Etienne Niyigena	6; 3	6; 4

==== Kenya vs. Cameroon ====
Kenya
2
Academia de Tenis Kikuxi Villas Club, Luanda, Angola
22 June 2024
Hard

Cameroon
1

			1	2	3
1	(Kenya) (Cameroon)	Albert Njogu; Jonathan Atana Onana	5; 7	2; 6
2	(Kenya) (Cameroon)	Kael Shalin Shah; Okala Hagoua Valentin Brayan Alexis	6; 0	6; 1
3	(Kenya) (Cameroon)	Keean Shah / Ibrahim Kibet Yego; Jonathan Atana Onana / Étienne Teboh	6; 2	0; 6	6; 4

== Final placements ==
Placing	Teams	
Promoted/First	Algeria	Senegal
Third	Burundi	DR Congo
Fifth	Angola	Kenya
Relegated/Seventh	Cameroon	Rwanda

- Algeria and Senegal were promoted to 2025 Davis Cup Africa Zone Group III.
- Cameroon and Rwanda were relegated to 2025 Davis Cup Africa Zone Group V.
