= 2026 Dublin Challenger – Doubles =

Doubles
- 2026 Dublin Challenger

Final
- Champions: (Netherlands) Jarno Jans (Netherlands) Niels Visker
- Runners-up: (United Kingdom) James MacKinlay (United Kingdom) Mark Whitehouse
- Score: 6–4, 6–4

Events
Singles	Doubles
- Dublin Challenger

This was the first edition of the tournament.

Jarno Jans and Niels Visker won the title after defeating James MacKinlay and Mark Whitehouse 6–4, 6–4 in the final.

== Seeds ==
1. (India) Rithvik Choudary Bollipalli / (United States) Trey Hilderbrand (quarterfinals)
2. (Australia) Blake Bayldon / (Australia) Patrick Harper (semifinals)
3. (Chinese Taipei) Hsu Yu-hsiou / (Netherlands) Thijmen Loof (quarterfinals)
4. (Ecuador) Andy Andrade / (Antigua and Barbuda) Jody Maginley (quarterfinals)

== Draw ==
Key

- Q = Qualifier
- WC = Wild card
- LL = Lucky loser
- Alt = Alternate
- ITF = ITF entry
- PR = Protected ranking
- SR = Special ranking
- SE = Special exempt
- JE = Junior exempt
- JR = Junior Accelerator Programme entrant
- CO = College Accelerator Programme entrant
- NG = Next Gen Accelerator Program entrant
- w/o = Walkover
- r = Retired
- d = Defaulted

First round
1	(India) RC Bollipalli (United States) T Hilderbrand	7^{9}	6
Alt	(Japan) R Noguchi (Japan) K Uchida	6^{7}	4
WC	(Republic of Ireland) C Barry (Republic of Ireland) C Gannon	6	6
(Venezuela) Juan José Bianchi (Venezuela) B Pérez	4	2
3	(Chinese Taipei) Y-h Hsu (Netherlands) T Loof	6	6
(United States) Zachary Fuchs (United States) Wally Thayne	4	4
(Australia) C Puttergill (United States) K Smith	7^{7}	2	[6]
(Netherlands) J Jans (Netherlands) N Visker	6^{4}	6	[10]
(France) H Mayot (France) C Tabur	3	2
(United Kingdom) J MacKinlay (United Kingdom) M Whitehouse	6	6
(Lithuania) E Butvilas (Belgium) G Onclin	4	4
4	(Ecuador) A Andrade (Antigua and Barbuda) J Maginley	6	6
(France) D Added (United Kingdom) T Hands	6	6
WC	(Republic of Ireland) Peter Buldorini (Republic of Ireland) Ammar Elamin	2	4
(Argentina) JP Ficovich (Colombia) N Mejía	3	4
2	(Australia) B Bayldon (Australia) P Harper	6	6

Quarterfinals
1	(India) RC Bollipalli (United States) T Hilderbrand	6	3	[9]
WC	(Republic of Ireland) C Barry (Republic of Ireland) C Gannon	1	6	[11]
3	(Chinese Taipei) Y-h Hsu (Netherlands) T Loof	5	6	[3]
(Netherlands) J Jans (Netherlands) N Visker	7	4	[10]
(United Kingdom) J MacKinlay (United Kingdom) M Whitehouse	4	6	[10]
4	(Ecuador) A Andrade (Antigua and Barbuda) J Maginley	6	1	[6]
(France) D Added (United Kingdom) T Hands	4	2
2	(Australia) B Bayldon (Australia) P Harper	6	6

Semifinals
WC	(Republic of Ireland) C Barry (Republic of Ireland) C Gannon	3	0
(Netherlands) J Jans (Netherlands) N Visker	6	6
(United Kingdom) J MacKinlay (United Kingdom) M Whitehouse	6	6^{3}	[12]
2	(Australia) B Bayldon (Australia) P Harper	3	7^{7}	[10]

Final
(Netherlands) J Jans (Netherlands) N Visker	6	6
(United Kingdom) J MacKinlay (United Kingdom) M Whitehouse	4	4
