= 2026 Dublin Challenger – Singles =

Singles
- 2026 Dublin Challenger

Final
- Champion: (United Kingdom) Henry Searle
- Runner-up: (Austria) Jurij Rodionov
- Score: 6–4, 6–2

Events
Singles	Doubles
- Dublin Challenger

This was the first edition of the tournament.

Henry Searle won the title after defeating Jurij Rodionov 6–4, 6–2 in the final.

== Seeds ==
1. (France) Titouan Droguet (semifinals)
2. (Italy) Francesco Maestrelli (first round)
3. (France) Kyrian Jacquet (semifinals)
4. (Austria) Jurij Rodionov (final)
5. (Estonia) Mark Lajal (first round, retired)
6. (Greece) Stefanos Sakellaridis (quarterfinals)
7. (Colombia) Nicolás Mejía (second round)
8. (Bulgaria) Grigor Dimitrov (quarterfinals)

== Draw ==
Key

- Q = Qualifier
- WC = Wild card
- LL = Lucky loser
- Alt = Alternate
- ITF = ITF entry
- PR = Protected ranking
- SR = Special ranking
- SE = Special exempt
- JE = Junior exempt
- JR = Junior Accelerator Programme entrant
- CO = College Accelerator Programme entrant
- NG = Next Gen Accelerator Program entrant
- w/o = Walkover
- r = Retired
- d = Defaulted

=== Finals ===
Semifinals
1	(France) Titouan Droguet	6^{3}	1
4	(Austria) Jurij Rodionov	7^{7}	6
3	(France) Kyrian Jacquet	6	2	2
WC	(United Kingdom) Henry Searle	4	6	6

Final
4	(Austria) Jurij Rodionov	4	2
WC	(United Kingdom) Henry Searle	6	6

=== Top half ===
First round
1	(France) T Droguet	6	4	6
Q	(United Kingdom) C Broom	3	6	1
(Switzerland) J Kym	0	7^{9}	6
Q	(Australia) T Kokkinakis	6	6^{7}	4
Q	(Japan) R Noguchi	4	4
(France) C Tabur	6	6
JR	(Bulgaria) I Ivanov	6^{8}	3
6/Alt	(Greece) S Sakellaridis	7^{10}	6
4	(Austria) J Rodionov	7^{7}	6
Q	(United States) Q Vandecasteele	6^{2}	2
(France) C Chidekh	5	6	3
(United States) C Smith	7	2	6
JR	(United States) Benjamin Willwerth	3	7^{8}	2
Q	(China) Y Zhou	6	6^{6}	6
Alt	(Argentina) JP Ficovich	4	6	3
7	(Colombia) N Mejía	6	4	6

Second round
1	(France) T Droguet	3	7^{7}	6
(Switzerland) J Kym	6	6^{5}	4
(France) C Tabur	6	6^{10}	3
6/Alt	(Greece) S Sakellaridis	1	7^{12}	6
4	(Austria) J Rodionov	6	7^{9}
(United States) C Smith	2	6^{7}
Q	(China) Y Zhou	7^{7}	6
7	(Colombia) N Mejía	6^{5}	3

Quarterfinals
1	(France) T Droguet	6	6
6/Alt	(Greece) S Sakellaridis	3	3
4	(Austria) J Rodionov	6	6
Q	(China) Y Zhou	4	2

Semifinals
1	(France) T Droguet	6^{3}	1
4	(Austria) J Rodionov	7^{7}	6

=== Bottom half ===
First round
8	(Bulgaria) G Dimitrov	6	6
(Luxembourg) C Rodesch	3	4
(Australia) B Tomic	7^{7}	4	6^{1}
WC	(Republic of Ireland) C Gannon	6^{4}	6	7^{7}
NG	(Netherlands) M Röttgering	6	6
WC	(Republic of Ireland) Peter Buldorini	4	2
(Belgium) G Onclin	6^{6}	6^{4}
3	(France) K Jacquet	7^{8}	7^{7}
5	(Estonia) M Lajal	6^{3}	1^{r}
LL	(Chinese Taipei) Y-h Hsu	7^{7}	4
(Sweden) E Ymer	6^{3}	6^{5}
WC	(United Kingdom) H Searle	7^{7}	7^{7}
Q	(United Kingdom) O Crawford	6^{5}	6	6
(Estonia) D Glinka	7^{7}	4	3
(Canada) A Galarneau	7^{8}	7
2	(Italy) F Maestrelli	6^{6}	5

Second round
8	(Bulgaria) G Dimitrov	6	6
WC	(Republic of Ireland) C Gannon	2	3
NG	(Netherlands) M Röttgering	4	0^{r}
3	(France) K Jacquet	6	2
LL	(Chinese Taipei) Y-h Hsu	4	6^{3}
WC	(United Kingdom) H Searle	6	7^{7}
Q	(United Kingdom) O Crawford	6	2	4
(Canada) A Galarneau	2	6	6

Quarterfinals
8	(Bulgaria) G Dimitrov	3	6^{9}
3	(France) K Jacquet	6	7^{11}
WC	(United Kingdom) H Searle	7	3	6
(Canada) A Galarneau	5	6	1

Semifinals
3	(France) K Jacquet	6	2	2
WC	(United Kingdom) H Searle	4	6	6
