= 2026 Dublin Challenger =

- Date: 15 – 20 June
- Edition: 1st
- Surface: Grass
- Location: Dublin, Ireland

Champions

Singles
- (United Kingdom) Henry Searle

Doubles
- (Netherlands) Jarno Jans / (Netherlands) Niels Visker
- Dublin Challenger

The 2026 Dublin Challenger was a professional tennis tournament played on grass courts. It was the first edition of the tournament which was part of the 2026 ATP Challenger Tour. It took place in Dublin, Ireland from 15 to 20 June 2026.

== Singles main-draw entrants ==
=== Seeds ===
Country	Player	Rank^{1}	Seed
FRA	Titouan Droguet	111	1
ITA	Francesco Maestrelli	126	2
FRA	Kyrian Jacquet	146	3
AUT	Jurij Rodionov	153	4
EST	Mark Lajal	154	5
GRE	Stefanos Sakellaridis	155	6
COL	Nicolás Mejía	167	7
BUL	Grigor Dimitrov	170	8

- ^{1} Rankings are as of 8 June 2026.

=== Other entrants ===
The following players received wildcards into the singles main draw:

- (Republic of Ireland) Peter Buldorini
- (Republic of Ireland) Conor Gannon
- (United Kingdom) Henry Searle

The following players received entry into the singles main draw through the Junior Accelerator programme:

- (Bulgaria) Ivan Ivanov
- (United States) Benjamin Willwerth

The following player received entry into the singles main draw through the Next Gen Accelerator programme:

- (Netherlands) Mees Röttgering

The following players received entry into the singles main draw as alternates:

- (Argentina) Juan Pablo Ficovich
- (Greece) Stefanos Sakellaridis

The following players received entry from the qualifying draw:

- (United Kingdom) Charles Broom
- (United Kingdom) Oliver Crawford
- (Australia) Thanasi Kokkinakis
- (Japan) Rio Noguchi
- (United States) Quinn Vandecasteele
- (China) Zhou Yi

The following player received entry as a lucky loser:

- (Chinese Taipei) Hsu Yu-hsiou

== Champions ==
=== Singles ===
- (United Kingdom) Henry Searle def. (Austria) Jurij Rodionov 6–4, 6–2.

=== Doubles ===
- (Netherlands) Jarno Jans / (Netherlands) Niels Visker def. (United Kingdom) James MacKinlay / (United Kingdom) Mark Whitehouse 6–4, 6–4.
