= Burundi Davis Cup team =

National tennis team

Burundi
- First year: 2022
- Years played: 1
- Ties played (W–L): 4 (2–2)
- Best finish: Zonal Group IV RR
- Most total wins: Guy Orly Iradukunda (6–1)
- Most singles wins: Guy Orly Iradukunda (4–0)
- Most doubles wins: Allan Gatoto (2–0), Guy Orly Iradukunda (2–1)
- Best doubles team: Allan Gatoto & Guy Orly Iradukunda (2–0)
- Most ties played: Guy Orly Iradukunda (4)
- Most years played: Guy Orly Iradukunda, Allan Gatoto, Moussa Kashindi, Abdoul Shakur Malick (1)

The Burundi Davis Cup team represents the Burundi in Davis Cup tennis competition and are governed by the Fédération de Tennis du Burundi. They currently compete in the Africa Zone of Group IV.

== History ==
Burundi competed in its first Davis Cup in 2022. Their best result was finishing first in their Group IV pool in 2022.

== Players ==
Player	W-L (Total)	W-L (Singles)	W-L (Doubles)	Ties	Debut	Ref
Allan Gatoto	3–2	1–2	2–0	3	2022	
Guy Orly Iradukunda	6–1	4–0	2–1	4	2022	
Moussa Kashindi	0–1		0–1	1	2022	
Abdoul Shakur Malick	0–1	0–1		1	2022	

== Recent performances ==
Here is the list of all match-ups of the DR Congo participation in the Davis Cup in 2022.

Year	Competition	Date	Surface	Venue	Opponent	Score	Result
2022	Africa Zone Group IV, Pool A	27 July	Hard	MUNDI Sport Complex (CMR)	Gabon	3–0	Win
2022	Africa Zone Group IV, Pool B	28 July	Hard	MUNDI Sport Complex (CMR)	Nigeria	2–1	Win
2022	Africa Zone Group IV, Pool B	29 July	Hard	MUNDI Sport Complex (CMR)	Mauritius	1–2	Loss
2022	Africa Zone Group IV, Promotional play-off	30 July	Hard	MUNDI Sport Complex (CMR)	Senegal	1–2	Loss

== See also ==
- Davis Cup
- Burundi Billie Jean King Cup team
