= Northern Mariana Islands Davis Cup team =

Northern Mariana Islands
- First year: 2024
- Years played: 1
- Ties played (W–L): 4 (3–1)
- Most total wins: Colin Sinclair (25–8)
- Most singles wins: Colin Sinclair (16–5)
- Most doubles wins: Colin Sinclair (9–3)
- Best doubles team: Tomas Abel/Colin Ramsey (3–0)
- Most ties played: Colin Sinclair (21)
- Most years played: Four players (1)

The Northern Mariana Islands Davis Cup team represents the Northern Mariana Islands in Davis Cup tennis competition and is governed under the Northern Mariana Islands Tennis Association (NMITA). Northern Mariana Islands currently compete in the Asia/Oceania Zone of Group V.

== History ==
Northern Mariana Islanders have previously competed in the Davis Cup as part of the Pacific Oceania along with other athletes from other Oceanian nations which had Class C membership in the International Tennis Federation (ITF). On September 22, the ITF elevated Northern Mariana Islands' membership to Class B enabling it to form teams for the Davis and Billie Jean King Cups.

In 2024, a separate Northern Mariana Islands team was formed and debuted at the 2024 Davis Cup Asia/Oceania Zone Group V. They won all of their games except against the promotion play-off against the Philippines, a team which played in the higher divisions but was suspended for years due to governing issues in their federation.

== See also ==
- Davis Cup
