= 2026 Davis Cup World Group II play-offs =

Tennis tournament

The 2026 Davis Cup World Group II play-offs were held from 6 to 8 February 2026. The thirteen winners of this round qualified for the 2026 Davis Cup World Group II while the thirteen losers will play at the Group III of the corresponding continental zone.

== Teams ==
Twenty-six teams will play for thirteen spots in the World Group II, in series decided on a home and away basis.

These twenty-six teams are:

- 13 losing teams from 2025 World Group II
- 13 teams from their Group III zone:
  - 3 from Europe
  - 3 from Asia/Oceania,
  - 3 from Americas, and
  - 3 from Africa
  - 1 highest-ranked team from the teams finishing fourth in each of the four 2025 Regional Group III events (Jamaica).

The 13 winning teams from the play-offs will qualify for the World Group II and the 13 losing teams will play at the Group III of the corresponding continental zone.

#: Nations Ranking as of 15 September 2025.

Seeded teams

1. Uzbekistan (#49)
2. Ireland (#50)
3. Uruguay (=#53)
4. Pakistan (#55)
5. Barbados (#56)
6. Latvia (#57)
7. Georgia (#58)
8. South Africa (#60)
9. El Salvador (#61)
10. Estonia (#62)
11. Togo (#63)
12. Thailand (#66)
13. Cyprus (#67)

Unseeded teams

- Dominican Republic (#68)
- Bolivia (#69)
- Indonesia (#70)
- Namibia (#71)
- Syria (#72)
- Benin (#73)
- Nigeria (#74)
- Jamaica (#75)
- Puerto Rico (#76)
- North Macedonia (#77)
- Bermuda (#81)
- Senegal (#83)
- Montenegro (#85)

== Results summary ==
| Home team | Score | Away team | Location | Venue | Surface |
|---|---|---|---|---|---|
| Nigeria | 3–1 | Uzbekistan [1] | Lagos Island | Lagos Lawn Tennis Club | Hard |
| Ireland [2] | 2–3 | Syria | Limerick | UL Sport Arena | Hard (i) |
| Jamaica | 1–3 | Uruguay [3] | Kingston | Liguanea Club | Hard |
| Pakistan [4] | 5–0 | Senegal | Islamabad | Pakistan Sports Complex | Grass |
| Barbados [5] | 2–3 | Bolivia | Bridgetown | Raymond Forde National Tennis Center | Hard |
| Dominican Republic | 3–1 | Latvia [6] | Santo Domingo Este | Centro Nacional de Tenis | Hard |
| Georgia [7] | 2–3 | Bermuda | Larnaca (Cyprus) | Herodotou Tennis Academy | Hard |
| South Africa [8] | 3–2 | Montenegro | Pretoria | Irene Country Club | Hard |
| Benin | 1–3 | El Salvador [9] | Cotonou | Sofitel Cotonou Marina Hotel & Spa | Hard |
| Namibia | 0–4 | Estonia [10] | Windhoek | Central Tennis Club Olympia | Hard |
| Indonesia | 4–0 | Togo [11] | Jakarta | Stadion Tenis Gelora Bung Karno | Hard |
| Thailand [12] | 4–0 | Puerto Rico | Nonthaburi | Lawn Tennis Association of Thailand | Hard |
| Cyprus [13] | 5–0 | North Macedonia | Nicosia | National Tennis Centre | Hard |

== Results ==
=== Nigeria vs. Uzbekistan ===
Nigeria
3
Lagos Lawn Tennis Club, Lagos Island, Nigeria
7–8 February 2026
Hard

Uzbekistan
1

| | | | 1 | 2 | 3 |
|---|---|---|---|---|---|---|
| 1 | (Nigeria) (Uzbekistan) | Canice Abua; Khumoyun Sultanov | 3; 6 | 4; 6 |
| 2 | (Nigeria) (Uzbekistan) | Daniel Adeleye; Abdulaziz Usmonjonov | 4; 6 | 6; 2 | 6; 4 |
| 3 | (Nigeria) (Uzbekistan) | Canice Abua / Michael Emmanuel; Denis Istomin / Khumoyun Sultanov | 7^{7} 6^{3} | 6; 4 |
| 4 | (Nigeria) (Uzbekistan) | Daniel Adeleye; Ilya Ignatov | 6; 3 | 6; 4 |
| 5 | (Nigeria) (Uzbekistan) | Canice Abua; Abdulaziz Usmonjonov | | | | not played |

=== Ireland vs. Syria ===
Ireland
2
UL Sport Arena, Limerick, Ireland
7–8 February 2026
Hard (i)

Syria
3

| | | | 1 | 2 | 3 |
|---|---|---|---|---|---|
| 1 | (Republic of Ireland) (Syria) | Michael Agwi; Hazem Naw | 1; 6 | 3; 6 |
| 2 | (Republic of Ireland) (Syria) | Peter Buldorini; Taym Al Azmeh | 7^{7} 6^{5} | 6; 4 |
| 3 | (Republic of Ireland) (Syria) | Charles Barry / Conor Gannon; Taym Al Azmeh / Hazem Naw | 6; 1 | 3; 6 | 6^{5} 7^{7} |
| 4 | (Republic of Ireland) (Syria) | Michael Agwi; Taym Al Azmeh | 1; 6 | 4; 6 |
| 5 | (Republic of Ireland) (Syria) | Ammar Elamin; Yacoub Makzoume | 6; 3 | 6; 2 |

=== Jamaica vs. Uruguay ===
Jamaica
1
Liguanea Club, Kingston, Jamaica
7–8 February 2026
Hard

Uruguay
3

| | | | 1 | 2 | 3 |
|---|---|---|---|---|---|---|
| 1 | (Jamaica) (Uruguay) | Rowland Phillips; Franco Roncadelli | 3; 6 | 6^{4} 7^{7} |
| 2 | (Jamaica) (Uruguay) | Blaise Bicknell; Joaquín Aguilar Cardozo | 6; 3 | 3; 6 | 7^{7} 6^{5} |
| 3 | (Jamaica) (Uruguay) | Daniel Azar / Nicholas Gore; Ariel Behar / Franco Roncadelli | 4; 6 | 4; 6 |
| 4 | (Jamaica) (Uruguay) | Blaise Bicknell; Franco Roncadelli | 3; 6 | 7; 5 | 4; 6 |
| 5 | (Jamaica) (Uruguay) | Rowland Phillips; Joaquín Aguilar Cardozo | | | | not played |

=== Pakistan vs. Senegal ===
Pakistan
5
Pakistan Sports Complex, Islamabad, Pakistan
6–7 February 2026
Grass

Senegal
0

| | | | 1 | 2 | 3 |
|---|---|---|---|---|---|
| 1 | (Pakistan) (Senegal) | Muzammil Murtaza; Nicolas Jadoun | 6; 3 | 1; 6 | 7; 5 |
| 2 | (Pakistan) (Senegal) | Aqeel Khan; Seydina André | 6^{3} 7^{7} | 7^{8} 6^{6} | 6; 2 |
| 3 | (Pakistan) (Senegal) | Muzammil Murtaza / Aisam-ul-Haq Qureshi; Seydina André / Nicolas Jadoun | 7^{7} 6^{4} | 7^{7} 6^{3} |
| 4 | (Pakistan) (Senegal) | Muzammil Murtaza; Yannick Languina | w/o |
| 5 | (Pakistan) (Senegal) | Muhammad Shoaib; Nicolas Jadoun | 7; 5 | 6; 2 |

=== Barbados vs. Bolivia ===
Barbados
2
Raymond Forde National Tennis Centre, Bridgetown, Barbados
7–8 February 2026
Hard

Bolivia
3

| | | | 1 | 2 | 3 |
|---|---|---|---|---|---|
| 1 | (Barbados) (Bolivia) | Kaipo Marshall; Juan Carlos Prado Ángelo | 3; 6 | 6; 4 | 3; 6 |
| 2 | (Barbados) (Bolivia) | Darian King; Murkel Dellien | 6^{6} 7^{8} | 6; 4 | 7^{7} 6^{2} |
| 3 | (Barbados) (Bolivia) | Darian King / Stephen Slocombe; Boris Arias / Murkel Dellien | 3; 6 | 6; 2 | 3; 6 |
| 4 | (Barbados) (Bolivia) | Darian King; Juan Carlos Prado Ángelo | 7; 5 | 6; 1 |
| 5 | (Barbados) (Bolivia) | Kaipo Marshall; Murkel Dellien | 6^{4} 7^{7} | 6^{6} 7^{8} |

=== Dominican Republic vs. Latvia ===
Dominican Republic
3
Central Nacional de Tenis Parque del Este, Santo Domingo Este, Dominican Republic
6–7 February 2026
Hard

Latvia
1

| | | | 1 | 2 | 3 |
|---|---|---|---|---|---|---|
| 1 | (Dominican Republic) (Latvia) | Roberto Cid Subervi; Kārlis Ozoliņš | 7^{8} 6^{6} | 6; 4 |
| 2 | (Dominican Republic) (Latvia) | Nick Hardt; Robert Strombachs | 7; 5 | 6^{2} 7^{7} | 6; 2 |
| 3 | (Dominican Republic) (Latvia) | Peter Bertran / Nick Hardt; Kārlis Ozoliņš / Robert Strombachs | 6; 4 | 7^{7} 6^{2} |
| 4 | (Dominican Republic) (Latvia) | Emmanuel Muñoz; Ēriks Valeinis | 5; 7 | 7^{8} 6^{6} | 6; 10 |
| 5 | (Dominican Republic) (Latvia) | Nick Hardt; Kārlis Ozoliņš | | | | not played |

=== Georgia vs. Bermuda ===
Georgia
2
Herodotou Tennis Academy, Larnaca, Cyprus
6–7 February 2026
Hard

Bermuda
3

| | | | 1 | 2 | 3 |
|---|---|---|---|---|---|
| 1 | (Georgia (country)) (Bermuda) | Aleksandre Bakshi; Daniel Phillips | 6; 4 | 3; 6 | 6^{5} 7^{7} |
| 2 | (Georgia (country)) (Bermuda) | Saba Purtseladze; Wayne Montgomery | 6; 2 | 6; 4 |
| 3 | (Georgia (country)) (Bermuda) | Aleksandre Metreveli / Saba Purtseladze; Richard Mallory / Daniel Phillips | 1; 6 | 6; 4 | 4; 6 |
| 4 | (Georgia (country)) (Bermuda) | Saba Purtseladze; Daniel Phillips | 6; 4 | 7; 5 |
| 5 | (Georgia (country)) (Bermuda) | Zura Tkemaladze; Wayne Montgomery | 6; 2 | 6^{4} 7^{7} | 3; 6 |

=== South Africa vs. Montenegro ===
South Africa
3
Irene Country Club, Pretoria, South Africa
7–8 February 2026
Hard

Montenegro
2

| | | | 1 | 2 | 3 |
|---|---|---|---|---|---|
| 1 | (South Africa) (Montenegro) | Philip Henning; Aleksa Krivokapić | 6; 4 | 6; 2 |
| 2 | (South Africa) (Montenegro) | Alec Beckley; Petar Jovanović | 2; 6 | 6; 3 | 3; 6 |
| 3 | (South Africa) (Montenegro) | Philip Henning / Thando Longwe-Smit; Petar Jovanović / Aleksa Krivokapić | 2; 6 | 6^{3} 7^{7} |
| 4 | (South Africa) (Montenegro) | Philip Henning; Petar Jovanović | 6; 3 | 6; 2 |
| 5 | (South Africa) (Montenegro) | Alec Beckley; Aleksa Krivokapić | 7^{7} 6^{3} | 6; 3 |

=== Benin vs. El Salvador ===
Benin
1
Sofitel Cotonou Marina Hotel & Spa, Cotonou, Benin
7–8 February 2026
Hard

El Salvador
3

| | | | 1 | 2 | 3 |
|---|---|---|---|---|---|---|
| 1 | (Benin) (El Salvador) | Patrick Agbo-Panzo; Diego Durán | 2; 6 | 5; 7 |
| 2 | (Benin) (El Salvador) | Alexis Klégou; Juan Carlos Fuentes Vásquez | 1; 6 | 7^{7} 6^{5} | 6; 4 |
| 3 | (Benin) (El Salvador) | Kocou Pacome Kakpo / Alexis Klégou; Diego Durán / Donald Hall | 4; 6 | 6^{2} 7^{7} |
| 4 | (Benin) (El Salvador) | Alexis Klégou; Diego Durán | 2; 6 | 5; 7 |
| 5 | (Benin) (El Salvador) | Patrick Agbo-Panzo; Juan Carlos Fuentes Vásquez | | | | not played |

=== Namibia vs. Estonia ===
Namibia
0
Central Tennis Club Olympia, Windhoek, Namibia
7–8 February 2026
Acrylic

Estonia
4

| | | | 1 | 2 | 3 |
|---|---|---|---|---|---|---|
| 1 | (Namibia) (Estonia) | Steyn Dippenaar; Mark Lajal | 1; 6 | 4; 6 |
| 2 | (Namibia) (Estonia) | Codie Schalk van Schalkwyk; Markus Mölder | 4; 6 | 6; 4 | 4; 6 |
| 3 | (Namibia) (Estonia) | Steyn Dippenaar / Codie Schalk van Schalkwyk; Mark Lajal / Johannes Seeman | 3; 6 | 4; 6 |
| 4 | (Namibia) (Estonia) | Ruben Yssel; Sten Hiiesalu | 2; 6 | 3; 6 |
| 5 | (Namibia) (Estonia) | Steyn Dippenaar; Markus Mölder | | | | not played |

=== Indonesia vs. Togo ===
Indonesia
4
Stadion Tenis Gelora Bung Karno, Jakarta, Indonesia
7–8 February 2026
Hard

Togo
0

| | | | 1 | 2 | 3 |
|---|---|---|---|---|---|---|
| 1 | (Indonesia) (Togo) | Muhammad Rifqi Fitriadi; Noah Koffi | 6; 1 | 6; 1 |
| 2 | (Indonesia) (Togo) | Justin Barki; Kwami Stanislas Dussey | 6; 0 | 6; 3 |
| 3 | (Indonesia) (Togo) | Justin Barki / Christopher Rungkat; Kwami Stanislas Dussey / Jean-Paul Kadangah Kili | 6; 0 | 7; 5 |
| 4 | (Indonesia) (Togo) | Anthony Susanto; Jean-Paul Kadangah Kili | 6; 1 | 6; 4 |
| 5 | (Indonesia) (Togo) | Justin Barki; Noah Koffi | | | | not played |

=== Thailand vs. Puerto Rico ===
Thailand
4
Lawn Tennis Association of Thailand, Nonthaburi, Thailand
7–8 February 2026
Hard

Puerto Rico
0

| | | | 1 | 2 | 3 |
|---|---|---|---|---|---|---|
| 1 | (Thailand) (Puerto Rico) | Maximus Jones; Yannik Álvarez | 6; 1 | 6; 2 |
| 2 | (Thailand) (Puerto Rico) | Kasidit Samrej; Marko Mesarovic | 6; 2 | 6; 1 |
| 3 | (Thailand) (Puerto Rico) | Pruchya Isaro / Maximus Jones; Noah Hernández / Leonardo Vega | 3; 6 | 7^{8} 6^{6} | 6; 2 |
| 4 | (Thailand) (Puerto Rico) | Pawit Sornlaksup; Marko Mesarovic | 2; 6 | 6; 4 | 11; 9 |
| 5 | (Thailand) (Puerto Rico) | Kasidit Samrej; Yannik Álvarez | | | | not played |

=== Cyprus vs. North Macedonia ===
Cyprus
5
National Tennis Centre, Nicosia, Cyprus
7–8 February 2026
Hard

North Macedonia
0

| | | | 1 | 2 | 3 |
|---|---|---|---|---|---|
| 1 | (Cyprus) (North Macedonia) | Melios Efstathiou; Amar Huseinović | 6; 2 | 6; 0 |
| 2 | (Cyprus) (North Macedonia) | Photos Photiades; Stefan Micov | 6; 3 | 6; 0 |
| 3 | (Cyprus) (North Macedonia) | Melios Efstathiou / Eleftherios Neos; Amar Huseinović / Stefan Micov | 6; 2 | 7; 5 |
| 4 | (Cyprus) (North Macedonia) | Nicholas Campbell; Kristijan Janev | 6; 2 | 7; 5 |
| 5 | (Cyprus) (North Macedonia) | Konstantinos Megalemos; Marko Aleksovski | 7^{10} 6^{8} | 6; 1 |
