= Conor Gannon =

Irish tennis player (born 2002)

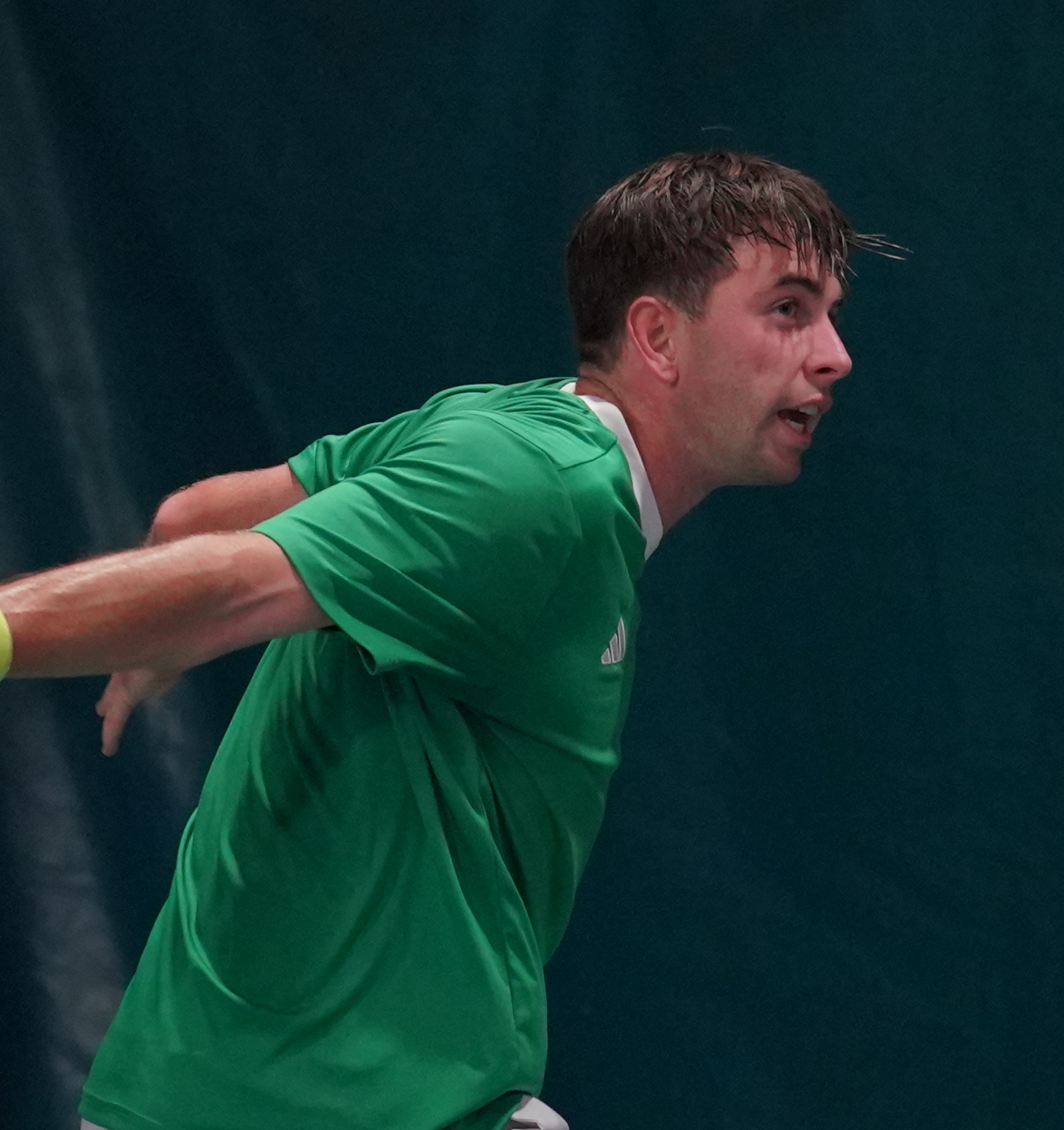
- Gannon in 2025
- Country (sports): Ireland
- Born: 6 June 2002 (age 24) Dublin, Ireland
- Height: 1.85 m (6 ft 1 in)
- Plays: Right-handed (two-handed backhand)
- College: University of Tennessee, University of Memphis
- Prize money: US $18,104

Singles
- Career record: 1–2 (at ATP Tour level, Grand Slam level, and in Davis Cup)
- Career titles: 1 ITF
- Highest ranking: No. 774 (21 September 2026)
- Current ranking: No. 774 (21 September 2026)

Doubles
- Career record: 1–4 (at ATP Tour level, Grand Slam level, and in Davis Cup)
- Career titles: 0
- Highest ranking: No. 467 (24 August 2026)
- Current ranking: No. 523 (21 September 2026)
- Last updated on: 21 September 2026.

Conor Gannon (born 6 June 2002) is an Irish tennis player. He has represented his country in the Davis Cup since 2023. Gannon has a career-high singles ranking of No. 774 achieved on 21 September 2026 and a best doubles ranking of No. 467 achieved on 24 August 2026. He has won one ITF singles title.

== Career ==
Having won eight junior ITF titles, Gannon was awarded a tennis scholarship to the University of Tennessee in 2020. He switched to the University of Memphis after completing his freshman year.

Gannon received his first call-up to the Ireland Davis Cup team for a tie in Barbados in September 2022 but was not chosen to play. He made his on-court debut in September 2023, during a World Group II tie away against El Salvador, where he defeated César Cruz in the opening singles match and then combined with David O'Hare to overcome Marcelo Arévalo and Lluis Miralles in the doubles as Ireland won 4–1.

In February 2024, he was a member of the Irish team which lost to Austria in the World Group I play-offs in Limerick, playing in the doubles alongside David O'Hare in a straight sets defeat to Alexander Erler and Lucas Miedler.

Gannon was in the Irish squad which travelled to face Tunisia in World Group II in September 2024, suffering defeats in both his singles matches against Aziz Dougaz and Skander Mansouri, as well as in the doubles, where he partnered Michael Agwi, against Dougaz and Mansouri.

In September 2025, he played alongside David O'Hare in the doubles rubber of Ireland's World Group II tie against China at the Sport Ireland National Indoor Arena in Dublin, losing to Cui Jie and Sun Fajing in straight sets.

Gannon partnered Charles Barry in the doubles rubber of Ireland's World Group II play-off with Syria at the UL Sport Arena in Limerick in February 2026, losing in three sets to Taym Al Azmeh and Hazem Naw.

In June 2026, he won three points in singles as Ireland maintained their place in Davis Cup Group III at the Europe Zone play-off event in Chișinău, Moldova. Later that month, Gannon was given a wildcard entry into the main-draw at the Dublin Challenger and recorded the biggest win of his career to-date by defeating former world No. 17 Bernard Tomic in a first round match lasting almost three hours and which was decided in a third set tiebreak. He lost in the second round to eighth seed and former world No. 3 Grigor Dimitrov in straight sets.

In July and August 2026, Gannon took part in the DLR Irish Open as an unseeded player. He defeated fifth seed Dimitris Azoidis, third seed Matt Ponchet and second seed Daniel de Jonge on the way to the final. In a championship match lasting almost three hours, Gannon defeated the seventh seed, Estonian Markus Molder, in three sets to win his first ITF title in front of his home crowd.

== ITF World Tennis Tour finals ==
=== Singles: 1 (1 title) ===
Legend ITF WTT (1–0)

Result	W–L	Date	Tournament	Tier	Surface	Opponent	Score
Win	1–0	Jul 2026	M15 Dublin, Ireland	WTT	Carpet	(Estonia) Markus Mölder	7–6^{(7–5)}, 6–7^{(3–7)}, 6–4
