= Dublin Challenger =

- 2026 Dublin Challenger

ATP Challenger Tour
- Location: Dublin, Ireland
- Category: ATP Challenger Tour
- Surface: Grass
- Website: website

The Dublin Challenger is a professional tennis tournament played on grass courts. It is currently part of the ATP Challenger Tour. It was first held in Dublin, Ireland in 2026.

== Past finals ==
=== Singles ===
Year	Champion	Runner-up	Score
2026	(United Kingdom) Henry Searle	(Austria) Jurij Rodionov	6–4, 6–2

=== Doubles ===
Year	Champions	Runners-up	Score
2026	(Netherlands) Jarno Jans (Netherlands) Niels Visker	(United Kingdom) James MacKinlay (United Kingdom) Mark Whitehouse	6–4, 6–4
