= William Bushamuka =

American tennis player

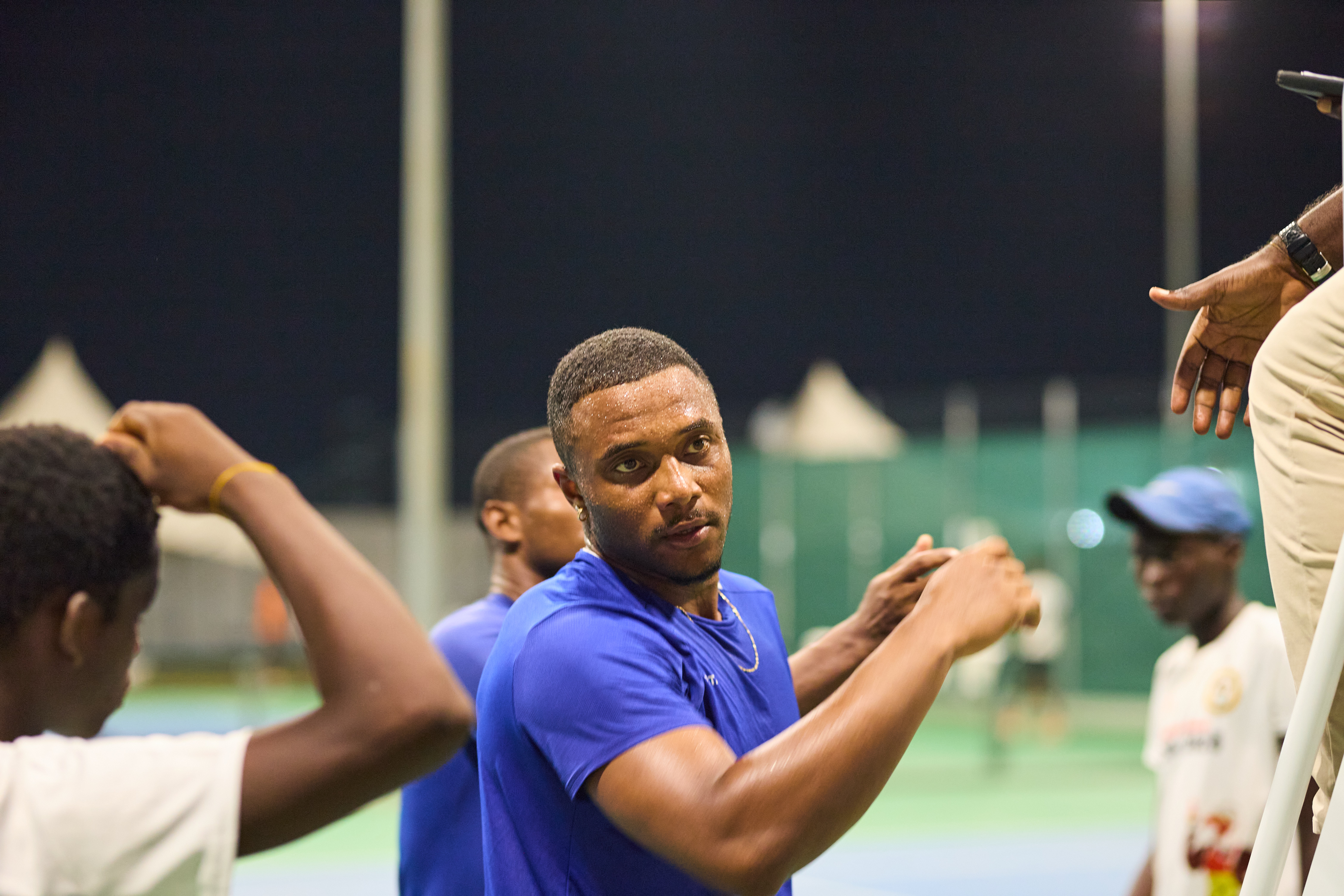
- 2023 African Games
- Country (sports): United States; DRC (in Davis Cup)
- Born: January 24, 1996 (age 30) Ithaca, New York, United States
- Height: 1.85 m (6 ft 1 in)
- Plays: Right-handed (two-handed backhand)
- College: University of Kentucky
- Prize money: $21,338

Singles
- Career titles: 0
- Highest ranking: No. 904 (November 11, 2019)

Doubles
- Career record: 3–1 (at ATP Tour level, Grand Slam level, and in Davis Cup)
- Career titles: 2 ITF
- Highest ranking: No. 638 (October 7, 2019)

Team competitions
- Davis Cup: 7–1
- Last updated on: June 13, 2025.

William Bushamuka (born January 24, 1996) is an American tennis player of Congolese descent.

Bushamuka has a career high ATP singles ranking of 904, achieved on November 11, 2019, and a career high ATP doubles ranking of 638, achieved on October 7, 2019. He has won one ITF doubles title.

Bushamuka represents DR Congo at the Davis Cup, where he has a W/L record of 7–1.

On the ITF tour, he last competed in November 2022. Since then, he has only been active at the Davis Cup.
