= Tanzania Davis Cup team =

National tennis team

Tanzania
- First year: 2022
- Years played: 1
- Ties played (W–L): 4 (1–2)
- Best finish: Zonal Group IV RR
- Most total wins: Frank Mshanga (3–2)
- Most singles wins: Frank Mshanga (2–1)
- Most doubles wins: Omari Hamis Sulle (1–0), Frank Mshanga (1–1)
- Best doubles team: Frank Mshanga & Omari Hamis Sulle (1–0)
- Most ties played: Frank Mshanga (4)
- Most years played: Omari Hamis Sulle, Frank Mshanga, Abubakari Risasi, Yusuph Godwin, Rahim Rashidi (1)

The Tanzania Davis Cup team represents Tanzania in Davis Cup tennis competition and are governed by the Tanzania Tennis Association. They currently compete in the Africa Zone of Group IV.

== History ==
Tanzania competed in its first Davis Cup in 2022. Their best result was finishing third in their Group IV pool in 2022.

== Players ==
Player	W-L (Total)	W-L (Singles)	W-L (Doubles)	Ties	Debut	Ref
Yusuph Godwin	0–1	0–1		2	2022	
Frank Mshanga	3–2	2–1	1–1	4	2022	
Rahim Rashidi	0–1		0–1	2	2022	
Abubakari Risasi	0–3	0–1	0–2	3	2022	
Omari Hamis Sulle	1–1	0–1	1–0	3	2022	

== Recent performances ==
Here is the list of all match-ups of the Tanzania participation in the Davis Cup in 2022.

Year	Competition	Date	Surface	Venue	Opponent	Score	Result
2022	Africa Zone Group IV, Pool A	4 July	Clay	Ecology Tennis Club (RWA)	Sudan	1–2	Loss
2022	Africa Zone Group IV, Pool B	6 July	Clay	Ecology Tennis Club (RWA)	Rwanda	0–3	Loss
2022	Africa Zone Group IV, Pool B	8 July	Clay	Ecology Tennis Club (RWA)	Uganda	2–1	Win
2022	Africa Zone Group IV, 5th place play-off	9 July	Clay	Ecology Tennis Club (RWA)	Botswana	2–1	Win

== See also ==
- Davis Cup
