= Lesotho Davis Cup team =

National tennis team

The Lesotho Davis Cup team represents Lesotho in the Davis Cup tennis competition and is governed by the Lesotho Lawn Tennis Association. They have not competed since 2001.

== History ==
Lesotho competed in its first Davis Cup in 2000. Their best result was finishing fourth in their Group IV pool in both 2000 and 2001.

== Last team (2001) ==
- Ntsane Moeletsi
- Lebohang Tšasanyane
- Mabusetsa Siimane
- Sekhoke Moshoeshoe

== See also ==
- Davis Cup
- Lesotho Billie Jean King Cup team
