= DR Congo Davis Cup team =

DRC tennis team

Democratic Republic of the Congo
- First year: 2022
- Years played: 1
- Ties played (W–L): 5 (3–1)
- Best finish: Zonal Group III RR
- Most total wins: William Bushamuka (7–1)
- Most singles wins: William Bushamuka (4–0)
- Most doubles wins: William Bushamuka (3–1)
- Most ties played: Christian Saidi, William Bushamuka (4)
- Most years played: Christian Saidi, William Bushamuka, Bienvenu Bolangi, Arnold Ikondo Moke (1)

The Democratic Republic of the Congo Davis Cup team represents the Democratic Republic of the Congo in Davis Cup tennis competition and are governed by the Fédération de la République Démocratique du Congo de Tennis. They currently compete in the Africa Zone of Group IV.

== History ==
The Democratic Republic of the Congo competed in its first Davis Cup in 2022. Their best result was finishing second in their Group IV pool in 2022.

== Players ==
Player	W-L (Total)	W-L (Singles)	W-L (Doubles)	Ties	Debut	Ref
Bienvenu Bolangi		1–0		2	2022	
William Bushamuka	7–1	4–0	3–1	4	2022	
Arnold Ikondo Moke	1–0		1–0	2	2022	
Christian Saidi	1–0		1–0	2	2022	

== Recent performances ==
Here is the list of all match-ups of the DR Congo participation in the Davis Cup in 2022.

Year	Competition	Date	Surface	Venue	Opponent	Score	Result
2022	Africa Zone Group IV, Pool B	4 July	Clay	Ecology Tennis Club (RWA)	Botswana	3–0	Win
2022	Africa Zone Group IV, Pool B	5 July	Clay	Ecology Tennis Club (RWA)	Angola	3–0	Win
2022	Africa Zone Group IV, Pool B	6 July	Clay	Ecology Tennis Club (RWA)	Congo	3–0	Win
2022	Africa Zone Group IV, Pool B	8 July	Clay	Ecology Tennis Club (RWA)	Togo	1–2	Loss
2022	Africa Zone Group IV, 3rd place play-off	9 July	Clay	Ecology Tennis Club (RWA)	Sudan	3–0	Win

== See also ==
- Davis Cup
