= Guy Orly Iradukunda =

Burundian tennis player (born 1996)

- Country (sports): Burundi
- Born: 21 March 1996 (age 29) Gitega, Burundi
- Plays: Right-handed
- College: Florida State
- Prize money: $43,714

Singles
- Career record: 1–0 (at ATP Tour level, Grand Slam level, and in Davis Cup)
- Career titles: 1 ITF
- Highest ranking: No. 610 (14 January 2019)

Doubles
- Career record: 1–0 (at ATP Tour level, Grand Slam level, and in Davis Cup)
- Career titles: 5 ITF
- Highest ranking: No. 552 (18 April 2022)
- Current ranking: No. 1,733 (29 December 2025)
- Last updated on: 29 December 2025.

Guy Orly Iradukunda (born 21 March 1996) is a Burundian tennis player.

Iradukunda has a career high ATP singles ranking of No. 610 achieved on 14 January 2019 and a career high ATP doubles ranking of No. 552 achieved on 18 April 2022.

Iradukunda represents Burundi at the Davis Cup, where he has a W/L record of 2–0.

Iradukunda played college tennis at Florida State University.
