= Mauritius Davis Cup team =

National tennis team

The Mauritius Davis Cup team represents Mauritius in Davis Cup tennis competition and are governed by the Mauritius Tennis Federation. They have not competed from 2007 and 2021. They returned in 2022

Mauritius currently compete in the Europe/Africa Zone of Group IV. They finished 5th in Group III in 2001.

== History ==
Mauritius competed in its first Davis Cup in 2000.

== Current team (2022) ==
- Lucas Alexander Lai Fat Fur
- Jake Lam Hau Ching
- Ryan Chee Tat Wong Pin Young
- Lukasz Skowronski (Captain-player)

== See also ==
- Davis Cup
- Mauritius Billie Jean King Cup team
