= Gabon Davis Cup team =

National tennis team

The Gabon Davis Cup team represents Gabon in Davis Cup tennis competition and are governed by the Fédération Gabonaise de Tennis.

Their best result was finishing third in Pool B of Group III in 2003.

== History ==
Gabon competed in its first Davis Cup in 2001. They have not competed since 2004.

== Current team (2022) ==
- Lyold Obiang Ondo
- Willy Lebendje
- Aymar Hugor Biyamba Nzila Star (Captain-player)

== See also ==
- Davis Cup
