= 2023 Davis Cup Africa Zone Group IV =

Davis Cup competition in 2023

The Africa Zone was the unique zone within Group 4 of the regional Davis Cup competition in 2023. The zone's competition was held in round robin format in Kigali, Rwanda from 26 to 29 July 2023.

== Participating nations ==
- Angola
- Botswana
- Cameroon
- Ghana
- Kenya
- Mozambique
- Nigeria
- Rwanda

== Draw ==
Date: 26–29 July 2023

Location: Ecology Tennis Club, Kigali, Rwanda (Clay)

Format: Round-robin basis. Two pools of four teams and nations will play each team once in their pool. Nations finishing in the top two of each pool will enter promotional play-offs, with the first of Pool A facing the second of Pool B and the first of Pool B facing the second of Pool A, and the two winners will be promoted to Africa Zone Group III in 2024.

Nations finishing in the bottom two of each pool will enter relegation play-offs, with the third of Pool A facing the fourth of Pool B and the third of Pool B facing the fourth of Pool A, and the two lost teams will be relegated to Africa Zone Group V in 2024.

=== Seeding ===
Pot	Nation	Rank^{1}	Seed
1	Kenya		
1	Rwanda		
2	Ghana		
2	Mozambique		
3	Cameroon		
3	Nigeria		
4	Botswana		
4	Angola		

- ^{1}Davis Cup Rankings as of

=== Round Robin ===
==== Pool A ====
	GHA	KEN	CMR	BOT	RR; W–L	Set; W–L	Game; W–L	Standings
Ghana		2–1	2–1	3–0	3–0	7–2 (%)	– (%)	1
Kenya	1–2		3–0	3–0	2–1	7–2 (%)	– (%)	2
Cameroon	1–2	0–3		3–0	1–2	4–5 (%)	– (%)	3
Botswana	0–3	0–3	0–3		0–3	0–9 (%)	– (%)	4

==== Pool B ====
	NGR	RWA	ANG	MOZ	RR; W–L	Set; W–L	Game; W–L	Standings
Nigeria		3–0	3–0	3–0	3–0	9–0 (%)	– (%)	1
Rwanda	0–3		2–1	3–0	2–1	5–4 (%)	– (%)	2
Angola	0–3	1–2		2–1	1–2	3–6 (%)	– (%)	3
Mozambique	0–3	0–3	1–2		0–3	1–8 (%)	– (%)	4

Standings are determined by: 1. number of wins; 2. number of matches; 3. in two-team ties, head-to-head records; 4. in three-team ties, (a) percentage of sets won (head-to-head records if two teams remain tied), then (b) percentage of games won (head-to-head records if two teams remain tied), then (c) Davis Cup rankings.

=== Playoffs ===
Placing	A Team	Score	B Team
Promotional	Ghana	3–0	Rwanda
Promotional	Nigeria	2–1	Kenya
Relegation	Cameroon	2–1	Mozambique
Relegation	Botswana	1–2	Angola

- Ghana and Nigeria were promoted to 2024 Davis Cup Africa Zone Group III.
- Botswana and Mozambique were relegated to 2024 Davis Cup Africa Zone Group V.

== Round Robin ==
=== Pool A ===
==== Kenya vs. Ghana ====
Kenya
1
Ecology Tennis Club, Kigali, Rwanda
26 July 2023
Clay

Ghana
2

			1	2	3
1	(Kenya) (Ghana)	Kael Shalin Shah; Isaac Nortey	3; 6	6; 3	4; 6
2	(Kenya) (Ghana)	Ismael Mzai; Abraham Asaba	7; 5	6; 4
3	(Kenya) (Ghana)	Ismael Mzai / Ibrahim Kibet Yego; Abraham Asaba / Isaac Nortey	5; 7	4; 6

==== Cameroon vs. Botswana ====
Cameroon
3
Ecology Tennis Club, Kigali, Rwanda
26 July 2023
Clay

Botswana
0

			1	2	3
1	(Cameroon) (Botswana)	Blaise Nkwenti; Esi Molefe	6; 3	6; 2
2	(Cameroon) (Botswana)	Cliford Wuyum Nkwain; Mark Nawa	6; 4	6; 0
3	(Cameroon) (Botswana)	Boriss Kamdem / Blaise Nkwenti; Oabona Koobatlile / Batsomi Marobela	6; 2	6; 3

==== Kenya vs. Botswana ====
Kenya
3
Ecology Tennis Club, Kigali, Rwanda
27 July 2023
Clay

Botswana
0

			1	2	3
1	(Kenya) (Botswana)	Kael Shalin Shah; Esi Molefe	6; 1	6; 0
2	(Kenya) (Botswana)	Ismael Mzai; Mark Nawa	6; 0	6; 1
3	(Kenya) (Botswana)	Keean Shah / Ibrahim Kibet Yego; Oabona Koobatlile / Batsomi Marobela	6; 2	6; 0

==== Ghana vs. Cameroon ====
Ghana
2
Ecology Tennis Club, Kigali, Rwanda
27 July 2023
Clay

Cameroon
1

			1	2	3
1	(Ghana) (Cameroon)	Isaac Nortey; Boriss Kamdem	6; 2	4; 6	4; 6
2	(Ghana) (Cameroon)	Abraham Asaba; Blaise Nkwenti	6; 4	6; 1
3	(Ghana) (Cameroon)	Abraham Asaba / Isaac Nortey; Boriss Kamdem / Blaise Nkwenti	6; 1	6; 3

==== Kenya vs. Cameroon ====
Kenya
3
Ecology Tennis Club, Kigali, Rwanda
28 July 2023
Clay

Cameroon
0

			1	2	3
1	(Kenya) (Cameroon)	Kael Shalin Shah; Boriss Kamdem	6; 4	6; 2
2	(Kenya) (Cameroon)	Ismael Mzai; Cliford Wuyum Nkwain	6; 2	6; 4
3	(Kenya) (Cameroon)	Keean Shah / Ibrahim Kibet Yego; Okala Hagoua Valentin Brayan Alexis / Boriss Kamdem	6; 2	6; 4

==== Ghana vs. Botswana ====
Ghana
3
Ecology Tennis Club, Kigali, Rwanda
28 July 2023
Clay

Botswana
0

			1	2	3
1	(Ghana) (Botswana)	Isaac Nortey; Esi Molefe	6; 0	6; 0
2	(Ghana) (Botswana)	Abraham Asaba; Mark Nawa	6; 0	6; 1
3	(Ghana) (Botswana)	Herman Abban / Samuel Agbesi Osei Antwi; Oabona Koobatlile / Batsomi Marobela	6; 3	6; 3

=== Pool B ===
==== Rwanda vs. Mozambique ====
Rwanda
3
Ecology Tennis Club, Kigali, Rwanda
26 July 2023
Clay

Mozambique
0

			1	2	3
1	(Rwanda) (Mozambique)	Junior Hakizumwami; Edilson Jose De Arauje Rosa	4; 6	6; 4	6; 0
2	(Rwanda) (Mozambique)	Ernest Habiyambere; Ricardo Jorge Jacinto	6; 0	6; 0
3	(Rwanda) (Mozambique)	Joshua Muhire / Etienne Niyigena; Luca Figueiredo / Jaime Sigauque	6; 4	6; 2

==== Nigeria vs. Angola ====
Nigeria
3
Ecology Tennis Club, Kigali, Rwanda
26 July 2023
Clay

Angola
0

			1	2	3
1	(Nigeria) (Angola)	Wilson Oswalele Igbinovia; Fernando Andre	6; 1	6; 3
2	(Nigeria) (Angola)	Christopher Bulus; Chris Lukanu Andre	6; 4	6; 4
3	(Nigeria) (Angola)	David Ekpenyong / Uchenna Oparaoji; Fernando Andre / Danilson Bento	6; 3	6; 2

==== Rwanda vs. Angola ====
Rwanda
2
Ecology Tennis Club, Kigali, Rwanda
27 July 2023
Clay

Angola
1

			1	2	3
1	(Rwanda) (Angola)	Junior Hakizumwami; Zidario Quitomina	7; 5	6; 1
2	(Rwanda) (Angola)	Ernest Habiyambere; Chris Lukanu Andre	7^{7} 6^{4}	4; 6	6; 3
3	(Rwanda) (Angola)	Joshua Muhire / Etienne Niyigena; Chris Lukanu Andre / Fernando Andre	5; 7	3; 6

==== Mozambique vs. Nigeria ====
Mozambique
0
Ecology Tennis Club, Kigali, Rwanda
27 July 2023
Clay

Nigeria
3

			1	2	3
1	(Mozambique) (Nigeria)	Jaime Sigauque; David Ekpenyong	0; 6	1; 6
2	(Mozambique) (Nigeria)	Luca Figueiredo; Christopher Bulus	0; 6	0; 6
3	(Mozambique) (Nigeria)	Luca Figueiredo / Edilson Jose De Arauje Rosa; Peter Lawal / Uchenna Oparaoji	4; 6	4; 6

==== Rwanda vs. Nigeria ====
Rwanda
0
Ecology Tennis Club, Kigali, Rwanda
28 July 2023
Clay

Nigeria
3

			1	2	3
1	(Rwanda) (Nigeria)	Junior Hakizumwami; David Ekpenyong	1; 6	3; 6
2	(Rwanda) (Nigeria)	Ernest Habiyambere; Wilson Oswalele Igbinovia	1; 6	2; 6
3	(Rwanda) (Nigeria)	Ernest Habiyambere / Etienne Niyigena; Christopher Bulus / Uchenna Oparaoji	5; 7	6; 2	4; 6

==== Mozambique vs. Angola ====
Mozambique
1
Ecology Tennis Club, Kigali, Rwanda
28 July 2023
Clay

Angola
2

			1	2	3
1	(Mozambique) (Angola)	Luca Figueiredo; Zidario Quitomina	6; 2	6; 0
2	(Mozambique) (Angola)	Edilson Jose De Arauje Rosa; Chris Lukanu Andre	2; 6	0; 6
3	(Mozambique) (Angola)	Luca Figueiredo / Edilson Jose De Arauje Rosa; Chris Lukanu Andre / Fernando Andre	4; 6	3; 6

== Play-offs ==
=== Promotional play-offs ===
==== Ghana vs. Rwanda ====
Ghana
3
Ecology Tennis Club, Kigali, Rwanda
29 July 2023
Clay

Rwanda
0

			1	2	3
1	(Ghana) (Rwanda)	Isaac Nortey; Junior Hakizumwami	6; 2	6; 2
2	(Ghana) (Rwanda)	Abraham Asaba; Ernest Habiyambere	6; 1	6; 3
3	(Ghana) (Rwanda)	Herman Abban / Desmond Ayaaba; Ernest Habiyambere / Claude Ishimwe	4; 6	6; 2	6; 2

==== Nigeria vs. Kenya ====
Nigeria
2
Ecology Tennis Club, Kigali, Rwanda
29 July 2023
Clay

Kenya
1

			1	2	3
1	(Nigeria) (Kenya)	David Ekpenyong; Kael Shalin Shah	1; 6	3; 6
2	(Nigeria) (Kenya)	Christopher Bulus; Ismael Mzai	6; 0	6; 1
3	(Nigeria) (Kenya)	Christopher Bulus / Wilson Oswalele Igbinovia; Keean Shah / Ibrahim Kibet Yego	6; 3	7^{7} 6^{4}

=== Relegation play-offs ===
==== Cameroon vs. Mozambique ====
Cameroon
2
Ecology Tennis Club, Kigali, Rwanda
29 July 2023
Clay

Mozambique
1

			1	2	3
1	(Cameroon) (Mozambique)	Boriss Kamdem; Jaime Sigauque	6; 2	6; 2
2	(Cameroon) (Mozambique)	Okala Hagoua Valentin Brayan Alexis; Edilson Jose De Arauje Rosa	7^{14} 6^{12}	5; 7	1; 6
3	(Cameroon) (Mozambique)	Boriss Kamdem / Cliford Wuyum Nkwain; Edilson Jose De Arauje Rosa / Jaime Sigauque	6; 3	6; 2

==== Botswana vs. Angola ====
Botswana
1
Ecology Tennis Club, Kigali, Rwanda
29 July 2023
Clay

Angola
2

			1	2	3
1	(Botswana) (Angola)	Batsomi Marobela; Fernando Andre	6; 1	6; 2
2	(Botswana) (Angola)	Esi Molefe; Chris Lukanu Andre	0; 6	1; 6
3	(Botswana) (Angola)	Oabona Koobatlile / Batsomi Marobela; Chris Lukanu Andre / Fernando Andre	6; 3	1; 6	3; 6

== Final placements ==
Placing	Teams	
Promoted/First	Ghana	Nigeria
Third	Kenya	Rwanda
Fifth	Angola	Cameroon
Relegated/Seventh	Botswana	Mozambique

- Ghana and Nigeria were promoted to 2024 Davis Cup Africa Zone Group III.
- Botswana and Mozambique were relegated to 2024 Davis Cup Africa Zone Group V.
