= 2019 Davis Cup =

2019 edition of the Davis Cup

Details
- Duration: 1 February – 1 December 2019
- Edition: 108th

Champion
- Winning nation: Spain

The 2019 Davis Cup was the 108th edition of the Davis Cup, a tournament between national teams in men's tennis. It was sponsored by Rakuten.

Spain won their sixth title (their first since 2011), defeating Canada in the final 2–0. Rafael Nadal received the Most Valuable Player (MVP) award for his performance in the tournament, after he won 8 of the 8 matches he participated in.

== Format changes ==
Starting with this edition, the format of the cup was changed. The main modification is the World Group took place at one location and in one week, with eighteen teams divided in six round-robin groups of three teams each, with the winners of the groups and the two best second places advancing to quarterfinals. The series between the teams in this stage featured two singles matches and one doubles match, instead of the best-of-5 series, with the matches also changing from best-of-5 sets to best-of-3. As the World Group was taking place as one single tournament, this event had been named the 2019 Davis Cup Finals. The lower zone groups I and II were composed of single ties deciding promotion or relegation.

=== Structure ===
Level	Group(s)			
1	World Group; 18 countries			
2	Group One Americas Zone; 6 countries	Group One Europe/Africa Zone; 11 countries		Group One Asia/Oceania Zone; 7 countries
3	Group Two Americas Zone; 8 countries	Group Two Europe/Africa Zone; 16 countries		Group Two Asia/Oceania Zone; 8 countries
4	Group Three Americas Zone; 9 countries	Group Three Europe Zone; 15 countries	Group Three Africa Zone; 10 countries	Group Three Asia/Oceania Zone; 9 countries
5				Group Four Asia/Oceania Zone; 11 countries

Note: The total number of nations in Group One is 24. However, the distribution among the three zones may vary each year, according to the number of nations promoted or relegated between Group One and the World Group. The number of nations in the World Group and Group One together is 22 from Euro/Africa Zone, 9 from Americas Zone and 9 from Asia/Oceania Zone.

== Davis Cup Finals ==
Date: 18–24 November 2019
Venue: Caja Mágica in Madrid, Spain
Surface: Hard court

18 nations are taking in the finals, formerly known as World Group. The qualification is as follows:

- 4 semifinalists of the previous edition
- 2 wild card teams
- 12 winners of a qualifier round, in February 2019

H = Host Nation, TH = Title-Holder, 2018SF = Semi-Finalists from the 2018 tournament, WC = Wild Card

Participating teams
Argentina (WC)	Australia	Belgium	Canada	Chile	Colombia
Croatia (TH)	France (2018SF)	Germany	Great Britain (WC)	Italy	Japan
Kazakhstan	Netherlands	Russia	Serbia	Spain (H, 2018SF)	United States (2018SF)

=== Seeds ===
The seedings are based on the Nations Ranking of 4 February.

1. France
2. Croatia (TH)
3. Argentina
4. Belgium
5. Great Britain
6. United States

=== Qualifying round ===
Date: 1–2 February 2019

Twenty-four teams played for twelve spots in the Finals, in series decided on a home and away basis.

These twenty-four teams are:

- 4 losing quarterfinalists of the previous edition,
- 8 winners of World Group play-offs of previous edition, and
- 12 best teams not previously qualified with best ranking of their zone:
  - 6 from Europe/Africa,
  - 3 from Asia/Oceania, and
  - 3 from Americas.

The 12 losing teams from the qualifying round then played at the Group I of the corresponding continental zone in September.

#: Nations Ranking as of 29 October 2018.

Seeded teams

1. Belgium (2018 Quarterfinalist, #4)
2. Serbia (2018 play-off winner, #8)
3. Australia (best ranked for replacing wild cards, #9)
4. Italy (2018 Quarterfinalist, #10)
5. Germany (2018 Quarterfinalist, #11)
6. Switzerland (2nd best ranked for replacing wild cards, #12)
7. Kazakhstan (2018 Quarterfinalist, #13)
8. Czech Republic (2018 play-off winner, #14)
9. Sweden (2018 play-off winner, #15)
10. Austria (2018 play-off winner, #16)
11. Canada (2018 play-off winner, #17)
12. Japan (2018 play-off winner, #18)

Unseeded teams

- Hungary (Europe/Africa's best ranked, #21)
- Netherlands (Europe/Africa's 2nd best ranked, #22)
- Russia (Europe/Africa's 3rd best ranked, #23)
- Portugal (Europe/Africa's 4th best ranked, #26)
- Bosnia and Herzegovina (Europe/Africa's 5th best ranked, #27)
- Slovakia (Europe/Africa's 6th best ranked, #29)
- India (Asia/Oceania's best ranked, #20)
- Uzbekistan (Asia/Oceania's 2nd best ranked, #24)
- China (Asia/Oceania's 3rd best ranked, #30)
- Colombia (Americas' best ranked, #19)
- Chile (Americas' 2nd best ranked, #25)
- Brazil (Americas' 3rd best ranked, #28)

Home team	Score	Away team	Location	Venue	Surface	Ref.
Brazil	1–3	Belgium [1]	Uberlândia	Ginásio Municipal Tancredo Neves	Clay (i)	
Uzbekistan	2–3	Serbia [2]	Tashkent	Saxovat Sport Servis Sport Complex	Hard (i)	
Australia [3]	4–0	Bosnia and Herzegovina	Adelaide	Memorial Drive Tennis Club	Hard	
India	1–3	Italy [4]	Kolkata	Calcutta South Club	Grass	
Germany [5]	5–0	Hungary	Frankfurt	Fraport Arena	Hard (i)	
Switzerland [6]	1–3	Russia	Biel/Bienne	Swiss Tennis Arena	Hard (i)	
Kazakhstan [7]	3–1	Portugal	Astana	Daulet National Tennis Centre	Hard (i)	
Czech Republic [8]	1–3	Netherlands	Ostrava	Ostravar Aréna	Hard (i)	
Colombia	4–0	Sweden [9]	Bogotá	Palacio de los Deportes	Clay (i)	
Austria [10]	2–3	Chile	Salzburg	Salzburgarena	Clay (i)	
Slovakia	2–3	Canada [11]	Bratislava	Aegon Arena	Clay (i)	
China	2–3	Japan [12]	Guangzhou	Guangdong Olympic Tennis Centre	Hard	

=== Group stage ===
Qualified for the Knockout stage

T = Ties, M = Matches, S = Sets

Group	Winners				Runners-up				Third			
Group	Nation	T	M	S	Nation	T	M	S	Nation	T	M	S
A	Serbia	2–0	5–1	10–2	France	1–1	3–3	6–7	Japan	0–2	1–5	3–10
B	Spain	2–0	5–1	11–2	Russia	1–1	4–2	8–6	Croatia	0–2	0–6	1–12
C	Germany	2–0	5–1	11–4	Argentina	1–1	3–3	8–6	Chile	0–2	1–5	2–11
D	Australia	2–0	5–1	10–3	Belgium	1–1	3–3	7–7	Colombia	0–2	1–5	4–11
E	Great Britain	2–0	4–2	10–5	Kazakhstan	1–1	3–3	7–7	Netherlands	0–2	2–4	5–10
F	Canada	2–0	4–2	9–5	United States	1–1	3–3	7–8	Italy	0–2	2–4	7–10

	Group A	SRB	FRA	JPN
1	Serbia		2–1	3–0
2	France	1–2		2–1
3	Japan	0–3	1–2	

	Group B	ESP	RUS	CRO
1	Spain		2–1	3–0
2	Russia	1–2		3–0
3	Croatia	0–3	0–3	

	Group C	GER	ARG	CHI
1	Germany		3–0	2–1
2	Argentina	0–3		3–0
3	Chile	1–2	0–3	

	Group D	AUS	BEL	COL
1	Australia		2–1	3–0
2	Belgium	1–2		2–1
3	Colombia	0–3	1–2	

	Group E	GBR	KAZ	NED
1	Great Britain		2–1	2–1
2	Kazakhstan	1–2		2–1
3	Netherlands	1–2	1–2	

	Group F	CAN	USA	ITA
1	Canada		2–1	2–1
2	United States	1–2		2–1
3	Italy	1–2	1–2	

=== Knockout stage ===
Quarterfinals
22 November
8	Serbia	1
17	Russia	2
21 November
9	Australia	1
13	Canada	2
22 November
5	Great Britain	2
11	Germany	0
22 November
3	Argentina	1
7	Spain	2

Semifinals
23 November
17	Russia	1
13	Canada	2
23 November
5	Great Britain	1
7	Spain	2

Final
24 November
13	Canada	0
7	Spain	2

==== Final ====
Canada
0
Estadio Manolo Santana
24 November 2019

Spain
2

			1	2	3
1	(Canada) (Spain)	Félix Auger-Aliassime; Roberto Bautista Agut	6^{3} 7^{7}	3; 6
2	(Canada) (Spain)	Denis Shapovalov; Rafael Nadal	3; 6	6^{7} 7^{9}
3	(Canada) (Spain)	Vasek Pospisil / Denis Shapovalov; Marcel Granollers / Feliciano López				not played

== Americas Zone ==
=== Group I ===
Dates: 13–14 September and 14–15 September 2019

The losers go on and participate to the 2020 Davis Cup World Group I Play-offs while the winners qualify to the 2020 Davis Cup World Group I

Seeds:

1. Brazil
2. Ecuador
3. Dominican Republic

Remaining nations:

- Barbados
- Venezuela
- Uruguay

Home team	Score	Away team	Location	Venue	Surface	Ref.
Brazil [1]	3–1	Barbados	Criciúma	Sociedade Recreativa Mampituba	Clay	
Venezuela	0–4	Ecuador [2]	Doral (Miami)^{1}	Doral Park Country Club	Hard	
Uruguay	3–1	Dominican Republic [3]	Montevideo	Carrasco Lawn Tennis Club	Clay	

^{1}Because of the Venezuelan financial crisis, the Venezuelan national team plays its "home" matches in the Miami metropolitan area in the United States.

=== Group II ===
Dates: 5–6 April, 13–14 September and 14–15 September 2019

The losers go on and participate to the 2020 Davis Cup World Group II Play-offs while the winners qualify to the 2020 Davis Cup World Group I Play-offs

Seeds:

1. Peru
2. Mexico
3. Guatemala

Remaining nations:

- Bolivia
- El Salvador
- Paraguay

Home team	Score	Away team	Location	Venue	Surface	Ref.
El Salvador	2–3	Peru [1]	Santa Tecla	Complejo Polideportivo de Ciudad Merliot	Hard	
Paraguay	1–4	Mexico [2]	Asunción	Club Internacional de Tenis	Clay	
Guatemala [3]	2–3	Bolivia	Guatemala City	Federación Nacional de Tenis	Hard	

=== Group III ===
Dates: 17–22 June 2019

Location: Costa Rica Country Club, Escazú, Costa Rica (hard)

The first three nations qualify for the 2020 Davis Cup World Group II Play-offs

Participating nations

Pool A

- Antigua and Barbuda
- Bahamas
- Costa Rica (host)
- Puerto Rico
- U.S. Virgin Islands

Pool B

- Bermuda
- Cuba
- Honduras
- Jamaica
- Panama
- Trinidad and Tobago

Inactive Teams

- Aruba
- Eastern Caribbean
- Haiti
- Saint Lucia

==== Play-offs ====
- Costa Rica, Jamaica and Puerto Rico qualified to the 2020 Davis Cup World Group II Play-offs

== Asia/Oceania Zone ==
=== Group I ===
Dates: 13–14 September, 14–15 September 2019 and 29–30 November 2019

The losers go on and participate to the 2020 Davis Cup World Group I Play-offs while the winners qualify to the 2020 Davis Cup World Group I

Seeds:

1. India
2. Uzbekistan
3. China

Remaining nations:

- South Korea
- Lebanon
- Pakistan

Home team	Score	Away team	Location	Venue	Surface	Ref.
Pakistan	0–4	India [1]	Nur-Sultan	Daulet National Tennis Centre	Hard (i)	
Lebanon	2–3	Uzbekistan [2]	Jounieh	Automobile and Touring Club of Lebanon	Clay	
China [3]	1–3	South Korea	Guiyang	Guiyang Olympic Sports Center Tennis Stadium	Hard (i)	

=== Group II ===
Dates: 5–6 April and 14–15 September 2019

The losers go on and participate to the 2020 Davis Cup World Group II Play-offs while the winners qualify to the 2020 Davis Cup World Group I Play-offs

Seeds:

1. Thailand
2. New Zealand
3. Chinese Taipei

Remaining nations:

- Hong Kong
- Indonesia
- Philippines

Home team	Score	Away team	Location	Venue	Surface	Ref.
Thailand [1]	3–1	Philippines	Nonthaburi	National Tennis Development Centre	Hard	
Indonesia	1–3	New Zealand [2]	Jakarta	Gelora Bung Karno Sports Complex	Hard	
Hong Kong	0–4	Chinese Taipei [3]	Hong Kong	Victoria Park Tennis Stadium	Hard	

=== Group III ===
Dates: 26–29 June 2019

Location: Singapore Sports Hub, Singapore (indoor hard)

The first three nations qualify for the 2020 Davis Cup World Group II Play-offs

The last nation is relegated to 2021 Davis Cup Asia/Oceania Zone Group IV

Participating nations

Pool A

- Kuwait
- Singapore (host)
- Sri Lanka
- Vietnam

Pool B

- Iran
- Malaysia
- Qatar
- Syria

==== Play-offs ====
- Vietnam, Syria and Sri Lanka qualified to the 2020 Davis Cup World Group II Play-offs
- Iran relegated to 2021 Davis Cup Asia/Oceania Zone Group IV

=== Group IV ===
Dates: 11–14 September 2019

Location: Jordan Tennis Federation, Amman, Jordan (hard)

The first two nations qualify for the 2021 Davis Cup Asia/Oceania Zone Group III

Participating nations

Pool A

- Bangladesh
- Pacific Oceania
- Saudi Arabia

Pool B

- Bahrain
- Iraq
- Oman

Pool C

- Guam
- Jordan (host)
- Mongolia
- Turkmenistan

Pool D

- Cambodia
- Kyrgyzstan
- Tajikistan
- United Arab Emirates

Inactive Teams

- Brunei
- Myanmar
- Yemen

==== Play-offs ====
- Pacific Oceania and Jordan were promoted to the 2021 Davis Cup Asia/Oceania Zone Group III

== Europe/Africa Zone ==
=== Group I ===
Dates: 13–14 September and 14–15 September 2019

The losers go on and participate to the 2020 Davis Cup World Group I Play-offs while the winners qualify to the 2020 Davis Cup World Group I

Seeds:

1. Czech Republic
2. Sweden
3. Austria
4. Hungary
5. Switzerland
6. Portugal

Remaining nations:

- Belarus
- Bosnia and Herzegovina
- Finland
- Israel
- Slovakia
- Ukraine

Home team	Score	Away team	Location	Venue	Surface	Ref.
Bosnia and Herzegovina	2–3	Czech Republic [1]	Zenica	Arena Zenica	Hard (i)	
Sweden [2]	3–1	Israel	Stockholm	Kungliga tennishallen	Hard (i)	
Finland	2–3	Austria [3]	Espoo	Espoo Metro Areena	Hard (i)	
Hungary [4]	3–2	Ukraine	Budapest	Sport 11 Sports, Leisure and Event Center	Clay	
Slovakia	3–1	Switzerland [5]	Bratislava	AXA Aréna NTC	Clay	
Belarus	3–2	Portugal [6]	Minsk	Republic Olympic Tennis Center	Hard (i)	

=== Group II ===
Dates: 5–6 April and 13–14 September 2019

The losers go on and participate to the 2020 Davis Cup World Group II Play-offs while the winners qualify to the 2020 Davis Cup World Group I Play-offs

Seeds:

1. Romania
2. South Africa
3. Denmark
4. Lithuania
5. Egypt
6. Norway

Remaining nations:

- Bulgaria
- Georgia
- Morocco
- Slovenia
- Turkey
- Zimbabwe

Home team	Score	Away team	Location	Venue	Surface	Ref.
Romania [1]	4–1	Zimbabwe	Piatra Neamț	Polyvalent Hall	Hard (i)	
South Africa [2]	4–1	Bulgaria	Cape Town	Kelvin Grove Club	Hard	
Denmark [3]	2–3	Turkey	Risskov	Vejlby-Risskov Hallen	Hard (i)	
Morocco	2–3	Lithuania [4]	Marrakesh	Royal Tennis Club de Marrakech	Clay	
Egypt [5]	1–3	Slovenia	Cairo	Gezira Sporting Club	Clay	
Norway [6]	3–1	Georgia	Oslo	Njård Tennisklubb	Clay	

=== Group III Europe ===
Dates: 11–14 September 2019

Location: Tatoi Club, Athens, Greece (clay)

The first four nations qualify for the 2020 Davis Cup World Group II Play-offs

The last two nations are relegated to 2021 Davis Cup Europe Zone Group IV

Participating nations

Pool A

- Greece (host)
- Luxembourg
- Monaco
- Poland

Pool B

- Estonia
- Latvia
- Montenegro
- North Macedonia

==== Play-offs ====
- Poland, Latvia, Estonia and Greece qualified to the 2020 Davis Cup World Group II Play-offs
- Montenegro and North Macedonia relegated to 2021 Davis Cup Europe Zone Group IV

=== Group III Africa ===
Dates: 11–14 September 2019

Location: Nairobi Club Ground, Nairobi, Kenya (clay)

The first two nations qualify for the 2020 Davis Cup World Group II Play-offs

The last two nations are relegated to 2021 Davis Cup Africa Zone Group IV

Participating nations

Pool A

- Mozambique
- Namibia
- Nigeria
- Tunisia

Pool B

- Algeria
- Benin
- Kenya (host)
- Madagascar

==== Play-offs ====
- Tunisia and Kenya qualified to the 2020 Davis Cup World Group II Play-offs.
- Namibia and Nigeria relegated to 2021 Davis Cup Africa Zone Group IV

=== Group IV Europe ===
Dates: 15–20 July 2019

Location: Centro Tennis Cassa di Risparmio, San Marino, San Marino (clay)

The first five nations qualify for the 2021 Davis Cup Europe Zone Group III

Participating nations

Pool A

- Albania
- Armenia
- Cyprus
- Iceland
- Liechtenstein

Pool B

- Andorra
- Ireland
- Kosovo
- Malta
- San Marino (host)

Inactive Teams

- Azerbaijan
- Moldova

==== Play-offs ====
- Cyprus, Ireland, Iceland, Liechtenstein and Malta were promoted to the 2021 Davis Cup Europe Zone Group III

=== Group IV Africa ===
Dates: 26–29 June 2019

Location: Kintélé Sports Complex, Brazzaville, Republic of Congo (hard)

The first two nations qualify for the 2021 Davis Cup Africa Zone Group III

Participating nations

Pool A

- Cameroon
- Gabon
- Ghana

Pool B

- Botswana
- Congo (host)
- Rwanda
- Uganda

Inactive Teams

- Angola
- Burkina Faso
- Djibouti
- Ethiopia
- Ivory Coast
- Lesotho
- Libya
- Mali
- Mauritius
- Senegal
- Sudan
- Togo
- Zambia

==== Play-offs ====
- Ghana and Rwanda were promoted to the 2021 Davis Cup Europe Zone Group IV
