= Benjamin Palm =

Ghanaian tennis player

- Full name: Benjamin Nii Okai Palm
- Country (sports): Ghana
- Born: 24 September 2001 (age 23)
- Plays: Right-handed (two-handed backhand)
- Prize money: $512

Singles
- Career record: 0–0 (at ATP Tour level, Grand Slam level)
- Career titles: 0; 0 Challenger, 0 Futures

Doubles
- Career record: 0–0 (at ATP Tour level, Grand Slam level)
- Career titles: 0; 0 Challenger, 0 Futures
- Highest ranking: No. 1,907 (6 January 2020)
- Current ranking: No. 2,068 (15 March 2021)

Team competitions
- Davis Cup: 1–0
- Last updated on: 15 March 2021.

Benjamin Palm (born 24 September 2001) is a Ghanaian junior tennis player.

Palm has a career high ATP doubles ranking of 1,907, achieved on 6 January 2020. Palm has a career high ITF juniors ranking of 923 achieved on 31 December 2018.

Palm has represented Ghana at Davis Cup, where he has a win-loss record of 1–0.

== Davis Cup ==
=== Participations: (1–0) ===
| Group membership World Group (0–0) WG Play-off (0–0) Group I (0–0) Group II (0–0) Group III (0–0) Group IV (1–0) | Matches by surface Hard (1–0) Clay (0–0) Grass (0–0) Carpet (0–0) | Matches by type Singles (0–0) Doubles (1–0) |

- ▲ ▼ indicates the outcome of the Davis Cup match followed by the score, date, place of event, the zonal classification and its phase, and the court surface.

| Rubber outcome | No. | Rubber | Match type (partner if any) | Opponent nation | Opponent player(s) | Score |
▲3–0; 26 June 2019; Complexe Sportif Concorde de Kintele, Brazzaville, Congo; Europe/Africa Zone Group IV Round Robin; Hard surface
| Victory | 1 | III | Doubles (with Isaac Nortey) | Gabon | Hervé Antchandie / Lyold Obiang Ondo | 2–6, 7–6^{(7–1)}, 7–6^{(7–4)} |
