= 2019 Davis Cup Africa Zone Group IV =

International tennis competition

The Africa Zone was the unique zone within Group 4 of the regional Davis Cup competition in 2019. The zone's competition was held in round robin format in Brazzaville, Republic of Congo, from 26 to 29 June 2019.

== Participating nations ==
- Botswana
- Cameroon
- Congo
- Gabon
- Ghana
- Rwanda
- Uganda

=== Inactive nations ===
- Angola
- Burkina Faso
- Djibouti
- Ethiopia
- Ivory Coast
- Lesotho
- Libya
- Mali
- Mauritius
- Senegal
- Togo
- Zambia

== Draw ==
Date: 26–29 June

Location: Kintélé Sports Complex, Brazzaville, Republic of Congo (hard)

Format: Round-robin basis.

=== Seeding ===
Pot	Nation	Rank^{1}	Seed
1	Cameroon	119	1
1	Rwanda	124	2
2	Botswana	128	3
2	Ghana	129	4
3	Uganda	131	5
3	Congo	NR	6
3	Gabon	NR	7

- ^{1}Davis Cup Rankings as of 4 February 2019

=== Round Robin ===
==== Pool A ====
		GHA	CMR	GAB	RR; W–L	Set; W–L	Game; W–L	Standings
4	Ghana		2–1	3–0	2–0	11–3 (79%)	81–68 (54%)	1
1	Cameroon	1–2		2–1	1–1	6–7 (46%)	66–64 (51%)	2
7	Gabon	0–3	1–2		0–2	3–10 (23%)	60–75 (44%)	3

==== Pool B ====
		RWA	UGA	BOT	CGO	RR; W–L	Set; W–L	Game; W–L	Standings
2	Rwanda		2–1	3–0	3–0	3–0	17–4 (81%)	113–71 (61%)	1
5	Uganda	1–2		2–1	3–0	2–1	14–7 (67%)	107–74 (59%)	2
3	Botswana	0–3	1–2		2–1	1–2	6–12 (33%)	82–80 (51%)	3
6	Congo	0–3	0–3	1–2		0–3	2–16 (11%)	29–106 (21%)	4

Standings are determined by: 1. number of wins; 2. number of matches; 3. in two-team ties, head-to-head records; 4. in three-team ties, (a) percentage of sets won (head-to-head records if two teams remain tied), then (b) percentage of games won (head-to-head records if two teams remain tied), then (c) Davis Cup rankings.

=== Playoffs ===
Placing	A Team	Score	B Team
1st–2nd	Ghana	2–0	Rwanda
3rd–4th	Cameroon	2–0	Uganda
5th–6th	Gabon	2–0	Botswana
7th	—N/a		Congo

== Round Robin ==
=== Pool A ===
==== Ghana vs. Gabon ====
Ghana
3
Kintélé Sports Complex, Brazzaville, Republic of Congo
26 June
Hard

Gabon
0

			1	2	3
1	(Ghana) (Gabon)	Herman Abban; Willy Lebendje	6; 0	7^{7} 6^{4}
2	(Ghana) (Gabon)	Isaac Nortey; Lyold Obiang Ondo	7; 5	7; 5
3	(Ghana) (Gabon)	Isaac Nortey / Benjamin Palm; Hervé Antchandie / Lyold Obiang Ondo	2; 6	7^{7} 6^{1}	7^{7} 6^{4}

==== Cameroon vs. Gabon ====
Cameroon
2
Kintélé Sports Complex, Brazzaville, Republic of Congo
27 June
Hard

Gabon
1

			1	2	3
1	(Cameroon) (Gabon)	Étienne Teboh; René Antchandie	6; 3	6; 3
2	(Cameroon) (Gabon)	Nkwenti Blaise Ngwohoh; Hervé Antchandie	6; 3	6; 4
3	(Cameroon) (Gabon)	Dieu Ne Dort Midzie / Étienne Teboh; Hervé Antchandie / Willy Lebendje	3; 6	5; 7

==== Cameroon vs. Ghana ====
Cameroon
1
Kintélé Sports Complex, Brazzaville, Republic of Congo
28 June
Hard

Ghana
2

			1	2	3
1	(Cameroon) (Ghana)	Étienne Teboh; Herman Abban	4; 6	4; 6
2	(Cameroon) (Ghana)	Nkwenti Blaise Ngwohoh; Isaac Nortey	5; 7	6; 3	6; 3
3	(Cameroon) (Ghana)	Nkwenti Blaise Ngwohoh / Étienne Teboh; Herman Abban / Isaac Nortey	6^{7} 7^{9}	3; 6

=== Pool B ===
==== Rwanda vs. Congo ====
Rwanda
3
Kintélé Sports Complex, Brazzaville, Republic of Congo
26 June
Hard

Congo
0

			1	2	3
1	(Rwanda) (Republic of the Congo)	Ernest Habiyambere; Brasny Ntomosso	6; 3	6; 1
2	(Rwanda) (Republic of the Congo)	Olivier Havugimana; Habib-Gildas Lhebath	6; 1	6; 1
3	(Rwanda) (Republic of the Congo)	Étienne Niyigena / Mathieu Uwizeyimana; Armel Mokobo / Fulgence Ntsiba	6; 0	6; 1

==== Botswana vs. Uganda ====
Botswana
1
Kintélé Sports Complex, Brazzaville, Republic of Congo
26 June
Hard

Uganda
2

			1	2	3
1	(Botswana) (Uganda)	Aobakwe Lekang; Frank Tayebwa	6; 1	6; 2
2	(Botswana) (Uganda)	Lefa Ashley Sibanda; David Oringa	4; 6	6^{3} 7^{7}
3	(Botswana) (Uganda)	Aobakwe Lekang / Matshidiso Malope; Simon Peter Ayella / David Oringa	3; 6	2; 6

==== Rwanda vs. Botswana ====
Rwanda
3
Kintélé Sports Complex, Brazzaville, Republic of Congo
27 June
Hard

Botswana
0

			1	2	3
1	(Rwanda) (Botswana)	Mathieu Umizeyimana; Aobakwe Lekang	6; 3	6; 3
2	(Rwanda) (Botswana)	Ernest Habiyambere; Lefa Ashley Sibanda	6; 3	7^{10} 6^{8}
3	(Rwanda) (Botswana)	Ernest Habiyambere / Étienne Niyigena; Thato Holmes / Matshidiso Malope	6; 3	6; 3

==== Uganda vs. Congo ====
Uganda
3
Kintélé Sports Complex, Brazzaville, Republic of Congo
27 June
Hard

Congo
0

			1	2	3
1	(Uganda) (Republic of the Congo)	Frank Tayebwa; Brasny Ntomosso	6; 3	6; 1
2	(Uganda) (Republic of the Congo)	David Oringa; Habib-Gildas Lhebath	6; 1	6; 0
3	(Uganda) (Republic of the Congo)	Simon Peter Ayella / David Oringa; Armel Mokobo / Brasny Ntomosso	6; 1	6; 1

==== Rwanda vs. Uganda ====
Rwanda
2
Kintélé Sports Complex, Brazzaville, Republic of Congo
28 June
Hard

Uganda
1

			1	2	3
1	(Rwanda) (Uganda)	Mathieu Uwizeyimana; Frank Tayebwa	1; 6	6; 2	6; 3
2	(Rwanda) (Uganda)	Ernest Habiyambere; David Oringa	6; 4	3; 6	7; 5
3	(Rwanda) (Uganda)	Olivier Havugimana / Étienne Niyigena; Simon Peter Ayella / Frank Tayebwa	6; 4	5; 7	0; 0	retired

==== Botswana vs. Congo ====
Botswana
2
Kintélé Sports Complex, Brazzaville, Republic of Congo
28 June
Hard

Congo
1

			1	2	3
1	(Botswana) (Republic of the Congo)	Aobakwe Lekang; Brasny Ntomosso	6^{5} 7^{7}	4; 6
2	(Botswana) (Republic of the Congo)	Lefa Ashley Sibanda; Armel Mokobo	6; 0	6; 0
3	(Botswana) (Republic of the Congo)	Thato Holmes / Matshidiso Malope; Habib-Gildas Lhebath / Armel Mokobo	6; 2	6; 0

== Playoffs ==
=== 1st to 2nd playoff ===
==== Ghana vs. Rwanda ====
Ghana
2
Kintélé Sports Complex, Brazzaville, Republic of Congo
29 June
Hard

Rwanda
0

			1	2	3
1	(Ghana) (Rwanda)	Herman Abban; Ernest Habiyambere	6; 4	1; 0		retired
2	(Ghana) (Rwanda)	Isaac Nortey; Olivier Havugimana	6; 3	6; 1
3	(Ghana) (Rwanda)	Herman Abban / Benjamin Palm; Ernest Habiyambere / Étienne Niyigena				not played

=== 3rd to 4th playoff ===
==== Cameroon vs. Uganda ====
Cameroon
2
Kintélé Sports Complex, Brazzaville, Republic of Congo
29 June
Hard

Uganda
0

			1	2	3
1	(Cameroon) (Uganda)	Étienne Teboh; Frank Tayebwa	6; 1	6; 1
2	(Cameroon) (Uganda)	Nkwenti Blaise Ngwohoh; David Oringa	3; 6	7^{7} 6^{1}	6; 3
3	(Cameroon) (Uganda)	Nkwenti Blaise Ngwohoh / Étienne Teboh; Simon Peter Ayella / David Oringa				not played

=== 5th to 6th playoff ===
==== Botswana vs. Gabon ====
Botswana
0
Kintélé Sports Complex, Brazzaville, Republic of Congo
29 June
Hard

Gabon
2

			1	2	3
1	(Botswana) (Gabon)	Thato Holmes; Willy Lebendje	4; 6	6^{6} 7^{8}
2	(Botswana) (Gabon)	Lefa Ashley Sibanda; Lyold Obiang Ondo	3; 6	3; 6
3	(Botswana) (Gabon)	Thato Holmes / Matshidiso Malope; Willy Lebendje / Lyold Obiang Ondo				not played
