= 2019 Davis Cup Americas Zone Group I =

International tennis competition

The Americas Zone will be one of the three regional zones of the 2019 Davis Cup.

In the Americas Zone there were three different tiers, called groups. The winners of the Group I ties in September will earn a place in the 2020 Davis Cup Qualifiers.

== Participating nations ==
Seeds:

1. Brazil
2. Ecuador
3. Dominican Republic

Remaining nations:

- Barbados
- Venezuela
- Uruguay

== Results summary ==
Home team	Score	Away team	Location	Venue	Surface
Brazil [1]	3–1	Barbados	Criciúma	Sociedade Recreativa Mampituba	Clay
Venezuela	0–4	Ecuador [2]	Doral, United States	Doral Park Country Club	Hard
Uruguay	3–1	Dominican Republic [3]	Montevideo	Carrasco Lawn Tennis Club	Clay

== Results ==
=== Brazil vs. Barbados ===
Brazil
3
Sociedade Recreativa Mampituba, Criciúma, Brazil
13–14 September 2019
Clay

Barbados
1

			1	2	3
1	(Brazil) (Barbados)	João Menezes; Darian King	6; 3	4; 6	2; 6
2	(Brazil) (Barbados)	Thiago Monteiro; Haydn Lewis	6; 2	6; 2
3	(Brazil) (Barbados)	Marcelo Melo / Bruno Soares; Darian King / Haydn Lewis	7^{7} 6^{4}	7; 5
4	(Brazil) (Barbados)	Thiago Monteiro; Darian King	6; 4	7^{8} 6^{6}
5	(Brazil) (Barbados)	João Menezes; Haydn Lewis				not played

=== Venezuela vs. Ecuador ===
Venezuela
0
Doral Park Country Club, Doral, United States
14–15 September 2019
Hard

Ecuador
4

			1	2	3
1	(Venezuela) (Ecuador)	Juan Lugo; Emilio Gómez	1; 6	0; 6
2	(Venezuela) (Ecuador)	Luis David Martínez; Roberto Quiroz	3; 6	3; 6
3	(Venezuela) (Ecuador)	Luis David Martínez / Roberto Maytín; Gonzalo Escobar / Diego Hidalgo	4; 6	4; 6
4	(Venezuela) (Ecuador)	Luis David Martínez; Antonio Cayetano March	7^{7} 6^{3}	5; 7	4; 10
5	(Venezuela) (Ecuador)	Juan Lugo; Roberto Quiroz				not played

=== Uruguay vs. Dominican Republic ===
Uruguay
3
Carrasco Lawn Tennis Club, Montevideo, Uruguay
14–15 September 2019
Clay

Dominican Republic
1

			1	2	3
1	(Uruguay) (Dominican Republic)	Pablo Cuevas; Roberto Cid Subervi	6; 1	6; 4
2	(Uruguay) (Dominican Republic)	Martín Cuevas; José Hernández-Fernández	1; 6	6^{7} 7^{9}
3	(Uruguay) (Dominican Republic)	Martín Cuevas / Pablo Cuevas; Víctor Estrella Burgos / Nick Hardt	6; 4	6; 3
4	(Uruguay) (Dominican Republic)	Pablo Cuevas; José Hernández-Fernández	7; 5	6; 0
5	(Uruguay) (Dominican Republic)	Martín Cuevas; Roberto Cid Subervi				not played
