= 2019 Davis Cup Asia/Oceania Zone Group I =

International tennis competition

The Asia/Oceania Zone will be one of the three regional zones of the 2019 Davis Cup.

In the Asia/Oceania Zone there are four different tiers, called groups. The winners of the Group I ties in September will earn a place in the 2020 Davis Cup Qualifiers, while the remaining nations in Groups I and II will be allocated a place within their region depending on their position in the Nations Ranking.

== Participating nations ==
Seeds:

1. India
2. Uzbekistan
3. China

Remaining nations:

- South Korea
- Lebanon
- Pakistan

== Results summary ==
Home team	Score	Away team	Location	Venue	Surface
Pakistan	0–4	India [1]	Nur-Sultan, Kazakhstan	Daulet National Tennis Centre	Hard (i)
Lebanon	2–3	Uzbekistan [2]	Jounieh	Automobile and Touring Club of Lebanon	Clay
China [3]	1–3	South Korea	Guiyang	Guiyang Olympic Sports Center Tennis Stadium	Hard (i)

== Results ==
=== Pakistan vs. India ===
Pakistan
0
Daulet National Tennis Centre, Nur-Sultan, Kazakhstan
29–30 November 2019
Hard (i)

India
4

			1	2	3
1	(Pakistan) (India)	Muhammad Shoaib; Ramkumar Ramanathan	0; 6	0; 6
2	(Pakistan) (India)	Huzaifa Abdul Rehman; Sumit Nagal	0; 6	2; 6
3	(Pakistan) (India)	Huzaifa Abdul Rehman / Muhammad Shoaib; Jeevan Nedunchezhiyan / Leander Paes	1; 6	3; 6
4	(Pakistan) (India)	Yousaf Khalil; Sumit Nagal	1; 6	0; 6
5	(Pakistan) (India)	Huzaifa Abdul Rehman; Ramkumar Ramanathan				not played

=== Lebanon vs. Uzbekistan ===
Lebanon
2
Automobile and Touring Club of Lebanon, Jounieh, Lebanon
13–14 September 2019
Clay

Uzbekistan
3

			1	2	3
1	(Lebanon) (Uzbekistan)	Hady Habib; Sanjar Fayziev	4; 6	4; 6
2	(Lebanon) (Uzbekistan)	Benjamin Hassan; Khumoyun Sultanov	2; 6	6; 3	7; 5
3	(Lebanon) (Uzbekistan)	Benjamin Hassan / Giovani Samaha; Sanjar Fayziev / Jurabek Karimov	2; 6	7; 5	3; 6
4	(Lebanon) (Uzbekistan)	Benjamin Hassan; Sanjar Fayziev	2; 6	6; 3	6; 4
5	(Lebanon) (Uzbekistan)	Hady Habib; Jurabek Karimov	4; 6	6; 1	1; 6

=== China vs. South Korea ===
China
1
Guiyang Olympic Sports Center Tennis Stadium, Guiyang, China
14–15 September 2019
Hard (i)

South Korea
3

			1	2	3
1	(China) (South Korea)	Zhang Zhizhen; Kwon Soon-woo	6^{4} 7^{7}	7^{7} 6^{4}	5; 7
2	(China) (South Korea)	Li Zhe; Nam Ji-sung	6^{1} 7^{7}	6^{0} 7^{7}
3	(China) (South Korea)	Gong Maoxin / Zhang Ze; Nam Ji-sung / Song Min-kyu	7^{8} 6^{6}	7^{7} 6^{5}
4	(China) (South Korea)	Bai Yan; Kwon Soon-woo	3; 6	4; 6
5	(China) (South Korea)	Zhang Zhizhen; Nam Ji-sung				not played
