= Kintélé =

- Commune
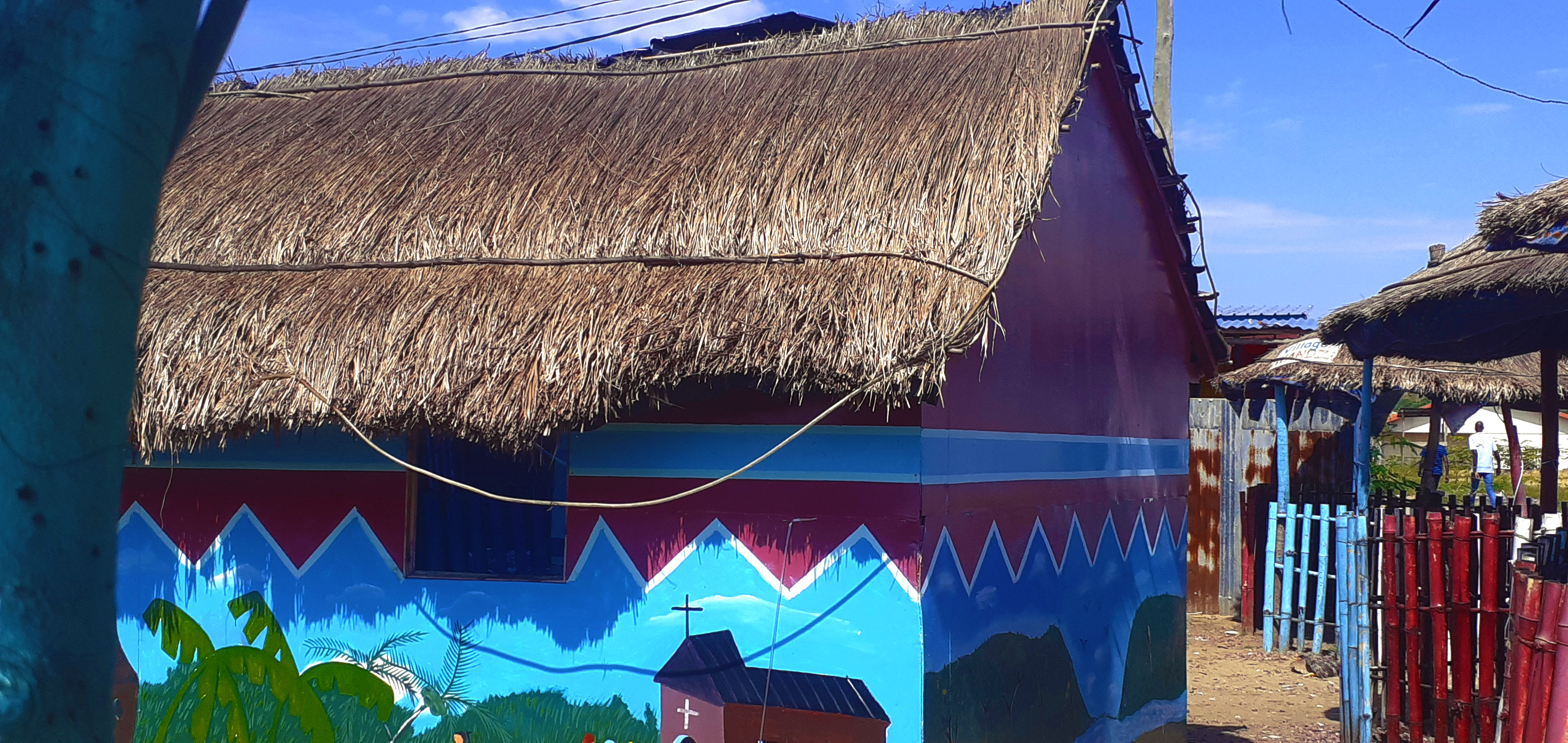
- Colorful renovation of the huts of the accommodation site ("Mille Logements") intended to accommodate the homeless after the Brazzaville arms dump blasts in 2012.

- Location in the Republic of the Congo
- Coordinates: 4°8′9″S 15°20′57″E
- Country: Republic of the Congo
- Department: Brazzaville

Population (2023 census)
  - Total: 71,629

Kintélé is a town in the north-eastern suburbs of Brazzaville, the capital of the Republic of the Congo. In 2017, it was established as a commune in Ignié District of Pool Department. In October 2024, it was transferred to Brazzaville.

Kintélé is bordered to the west by the Djiri river and to the south and east by the Congo River.

It is connected to Brazzaville by the Talangaï-Kintélé viaduct (almost 7 km long) which overlooks the major bed of the Congo.

The most notable facilities are the Kintélé Sports Complex (built for the 2015 African Games) and the Denis Sassou Nguesso University (DSNU) opened in February 2021.
