= Herman Abban =

Ghanaian tennis player

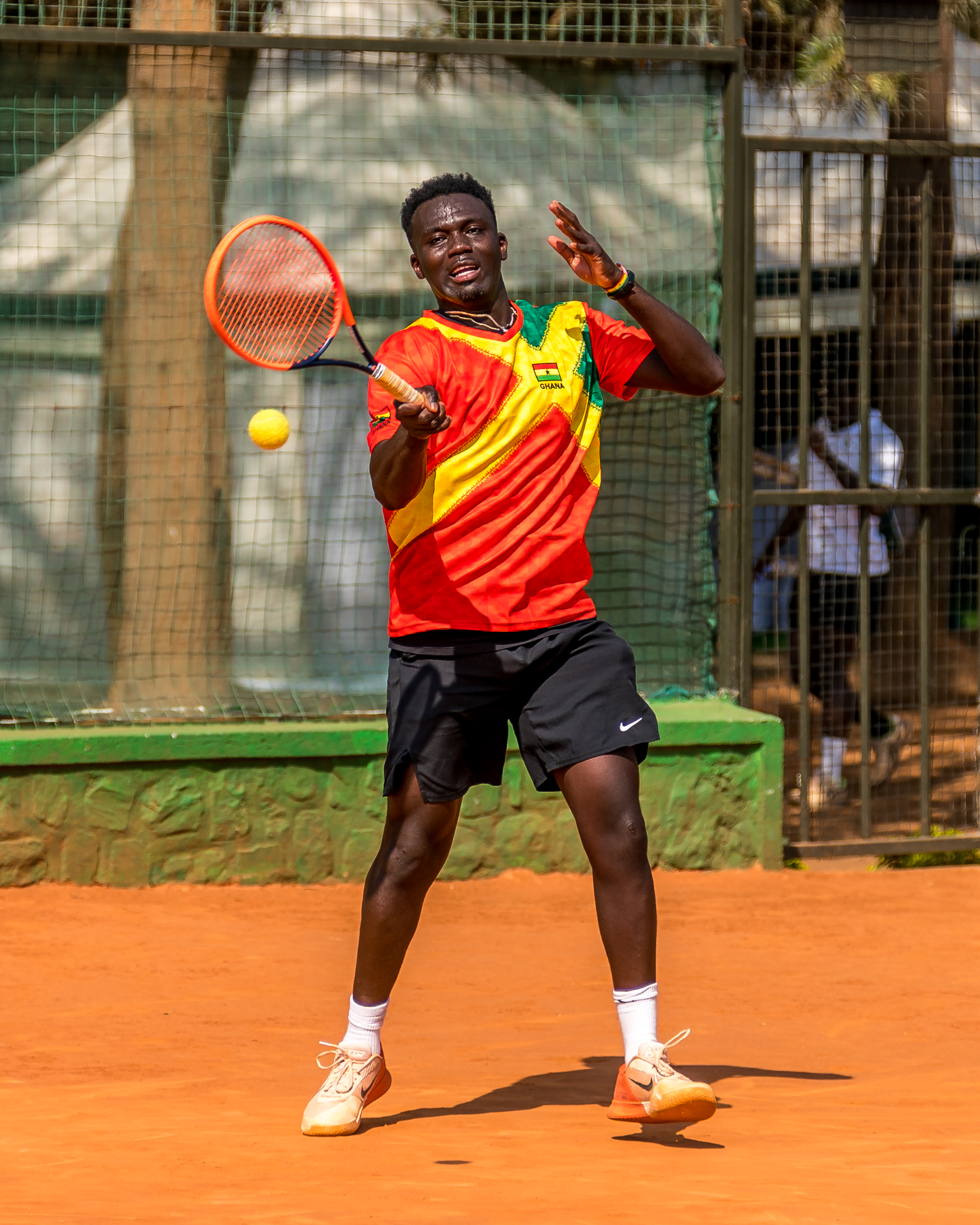
- Full name: Herman Abban Jnr
- Country (sports): Ghana
- Residence: Chicago, Illinois, U.S.
- Born: 19 December 1994 (age 31) Accra, Ghana
- Plays: Right-handed(two-handed backhand)
- Prize money: $600

Singles
- Career record: 0–0 (at ATP Tour level, Grand Slam level)
- Career titles: 0; 0 Challenger, 0 Futures

Doubles
- Career record: 0–0 (at ATP Tour level, Grand Slam level)
- Career titles: 0; 0 Challenger, 0 Futures
- Highest ranking: No. 809 (2 January 2012)

Team competitions
- Davis Cup: 4–0
- Last updated on: 21 January 2021.

Herman Abban (born December 19, 1994) is a Ghanaian Professional tennis player. Herman set up the Herman Abban Foundation (HAF) in 2019 to support the young and needy in the society by providing books and tennis equipments.

== Tennis career ==
Abban has a career high ITF singles ranking of 809, achieved on 2 January 2012. Abban has represented Ghana at Davis Cup where he has a win-loss record of 4–0.

Herman was part of the Ghanaian national tennis team the Golden Rackets that qualified to the Davis Cup Africa Zone III after taking part in the Zone IV games in Kigali, Rwanda in July 2023.

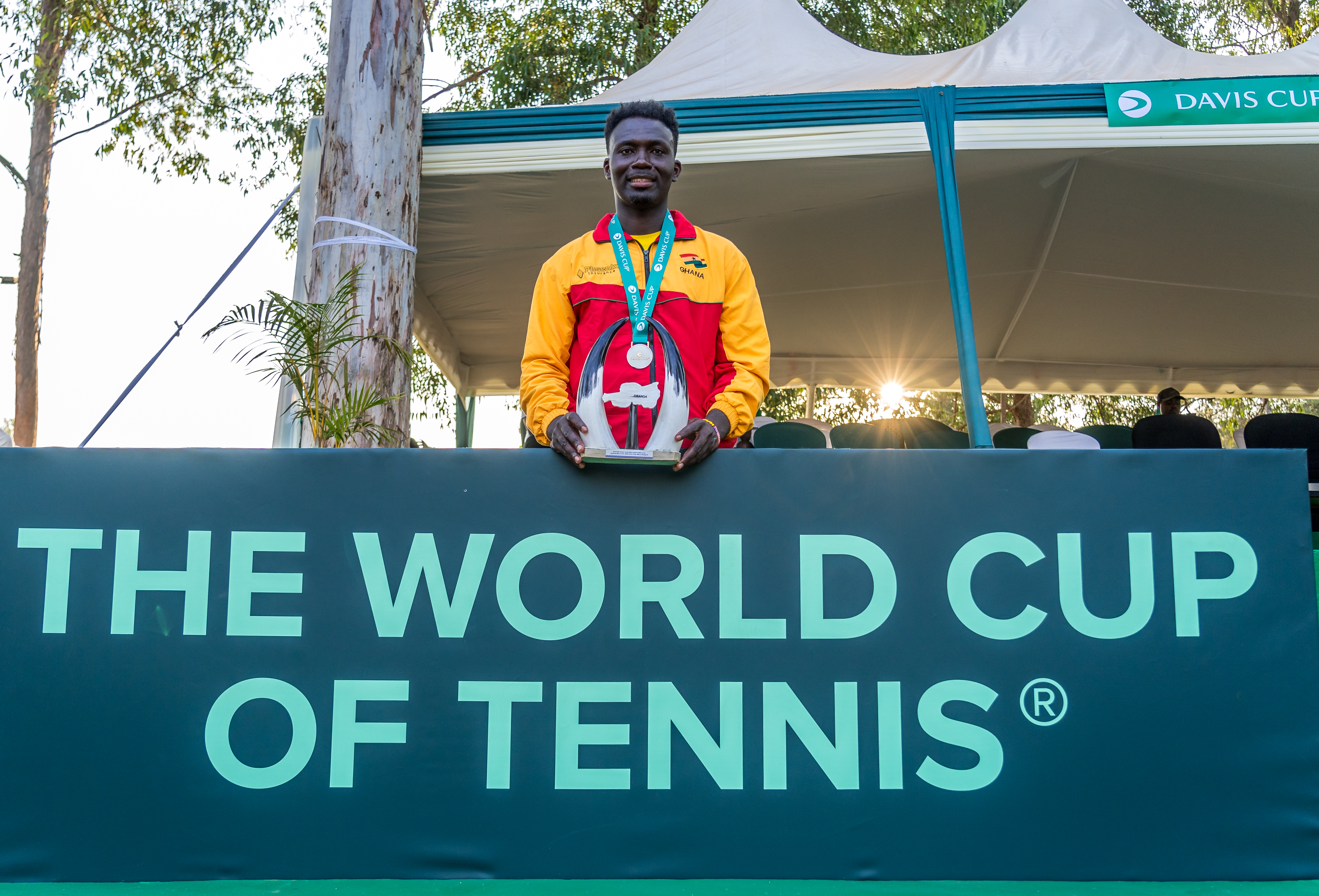
Herman with the Davis Cup Zone III qualification trophy.

== Davis Cup ==
=== Participations: (4–0) ===
Group membership World Group (0–0) WG Play-off (0–0) Group I (0–0) Group II (0–0) Group III (0–0) Group IV (4–0)	Matches by surface Hard (4–0) Clay (0–0) Grass (0–0) Carpet (0–0)	Matches by type Singles (3–0) Doubles (1–0)

- ▲ ▼ indicates the outcome of the Davis Cup match followed by the score, date, place of event, the zonal classification and its phase, and the court surface.

Rubber outcome	No.	Rubber	Match type (partner if any)	Opponent nation	Opponent player(s)	Score
Victory	1	I	26 June 2019; Complexe Sportif Concorde de Kintele, Brazzaville, Congo; Europe/Africa Zone Group IV Round Robin; Hard surface	Gabon	Willy Lebendje	6-0, 7–6
Victory	2	I	28 June 2019; Complexe Sportif Concorde de Kintele, Brazzaville, Congo; Europe/Africa Zone Group IV Round Robin; Hard surface	Cameroon	Étienne Teboh	6-4, 6–4
Victory	1	I	29 June 2019; Complexe Sportif Concorde de Kintele, Brazzaville, Congo; Europe/Africa Zone Group IV Play-off; Hard surface	Rwanda	Ernest Habiyambere	6-4, 1-0(Retired)
Victory	1	I	28 July 2023; Ecology Tennis Club, Kicukiro, Kigali, Rwanda; Europe/Africa Zone Group IV Play-off; Clay	Botswana	Oabona KOOBATLILE, Batsomi MAROBELA	6-3, 6–3
Victory	2	I	29 July 2023; Ecology Tennis Club, Kicukiro, Kigali, Rwanda; Europe/Africa Zone Group IV Play-off; Clay	Rwanda	Ernest HABIYAMBERE, Claude ISHIMWE	4-6, 6–2, 6–2

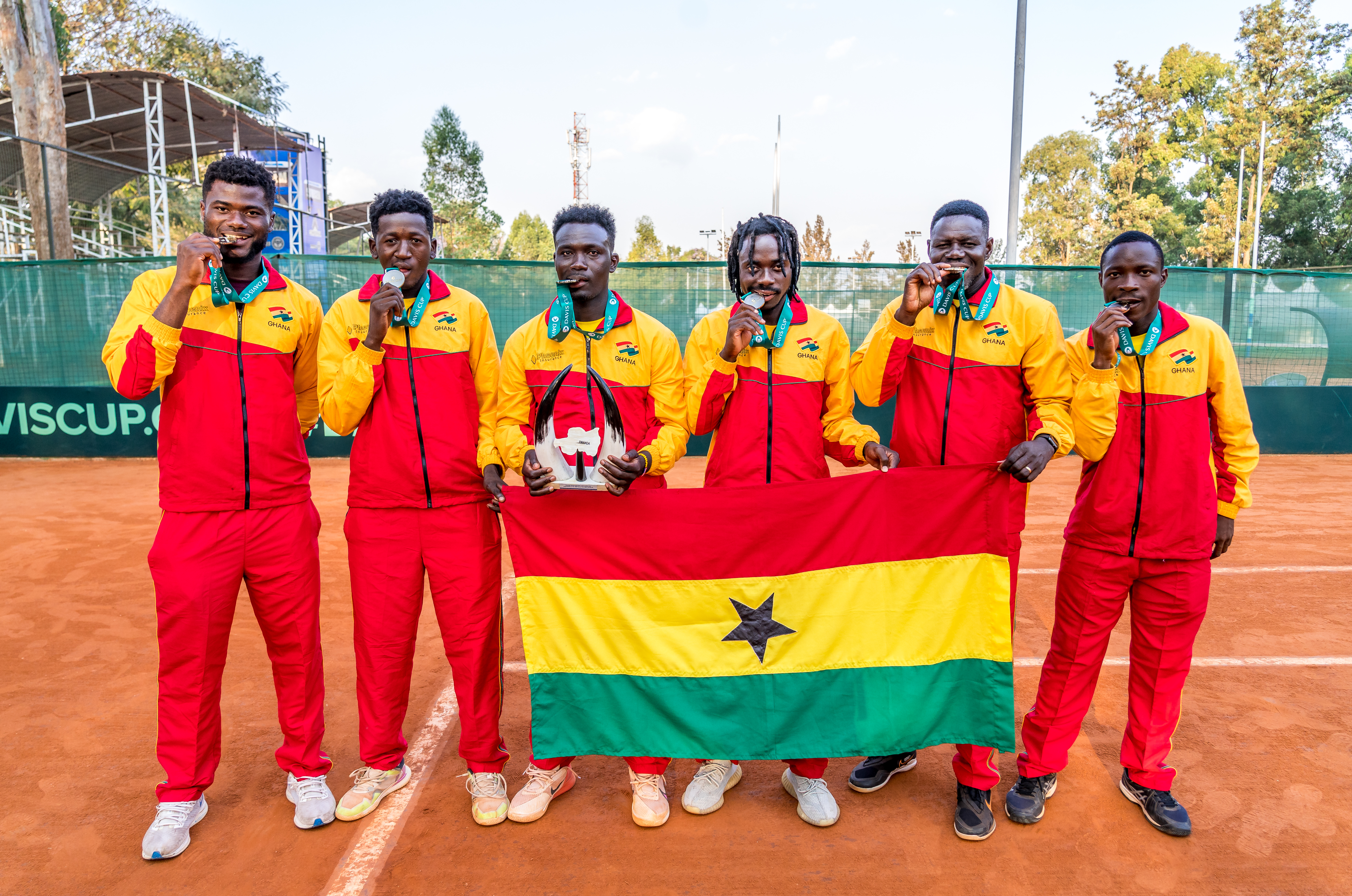
Herman with team Ghana at the Davis Cup Zone III qualification trophy.

== Philanthropy ==
Herman donated wheel chairs to the members of the Ghana Wheelchair Tennis Team to aid in their preparation for the Africa Paralympic Games which is being hosted in Ghana in 2023. In September 2024 he visited a basic school in Cape Coast to provide them with school supplies and mentorship.
