= 2024 Davis Cup Africa Zone Group III =

Davis Cup competition in 2024

The Africa Zone was the unique zone within Group 3 of the regional Davis Cup competition in 2024. The zone's competition was held in round robin format in Abuja, Nigeria, from 16 to 21 July 2024.

== Participating nations ==
- Benin
- Ivory Coast
- Ghana
- Namibia
- Nigeria
- Zimbabwe

== Draw ==
Date: 16–21 July 2024

Location: National Tennis Centre, Abuja, Nigeria (Hard)

Format: Round-robin basis. One pool of six teams and nations will play each team once in their group. The top three teams will be promoted to World Group II play-offs in 2025.

The bottom two teams will be relegated to Africa Zone Group IV in 2025.

=== Seeding ===
Pot	Nation	Rank^{1}	Seed
1	Zimbabwe	77	1
2	Namibia	78	2
3	Ivory Coast	79	3
4	Benin	83=	4
5	Ghana	89	5
6	Nigeria	92	6

- ^{1}Davis Cup Rankings as of 18 March 2024

=== Round Robin ===
		NAM	NGR	ZIM	BEN	GHA	CIV	RR; W–L	Set; W–L	Game; W–L	Standings
2	Namibia		3–0	1–2	3–0	2–1	3–0	4–1	12–3 (%)	– (%)	1
6	Nigeria	0–3		2–1	3–0	2–1	3–0	4–1	10–5 (%)	– (%)	2
1	Zimbabwe	2–1	1–2		2–1	2–1	3–0	4–1	10–5 (%)	– (%)	3
4	Benin	0–3	0–3	1–2		3–0	2–1	2–3	6–9 (%)	– (%)	4
5	Ghana	1–2	1–2	1–2	0–3		3–0	1–4	6–9 (%)	– (%)	5
3	Ivory Coast	0–3	0–3	0–3	1–2	0–3		0–5	1–14 (%)	– (%)	6

Standings are determined by: 1. number of wins; 2. number of matches; 3. in two-team ties, head-to-head records; 4. in three-team ties, (a) percentage of sets won (head-to-head records if two teams remain tied), then (b) percentage of games won (head-to-head records if two teams remain tied), then (c) Davis Cup rankings.

- Namibia, Nigeria and Zimbabwe were promoted to 2025 Davis Cup World Group II play-offs and Benin were also promoted as one of the four highest-ranked non-promoted teams in each 2024 Regional Group III event.
- Ghana and Ivory Coast were relegated to 2025 Davis Cup Africa Zone Group IV.

== Round Robin ==
=== Zimbabwe vs. Nigeria ===
Zimbabwe
1
National Tennis Centre, Abuja, Nigeria
16–17 July 2024
Hard

Nigeria
2

			1	2	3
1	(Zimbabwe) (Nigeria)	Courtney John Lock; Michael Emmanuel	6; 2	1; 6	3; 6
2	(Zimbabwe) (Nigeria)	Benjamin Lock; Christopher Bulus	6; 3	2; 6	3; 6
3	(Zimbabwe) (Nigeria)	Benjamin Lock / Courtney John Lock; Daniel Adeleye / Uchenna Oparaoji	7; 5	6; 1

=== Namibia vs. Ghana ===
Namibia
2
National Tennis Centre, Abuja, Nigeria
16 July 2024
Hard

Ghana
1

			1	2	3
1	(Namibia) (Ghana)	Codie Schalk Van Schalkwyk; Isaac Nortey	6; 0	6; 3
2	(Namibia) (Ghana)	Connor Henry Van Schalkwyk; Abraham Asaba	6; 4	6; 1
3	(Namibia) (Ghana)	Codie Schalk Van Schalkwyk / Connor Henry Van Schalkwyk; Abraham Asaba / Isaac Nortey	4; 6	6; 3	5; 7

=== Ivory Coast vs. Benin ===
Ivory Coast
1
National Tennis Centre, Abuja, Nigeria
16 July 2024
Hard

Benin
2

			1	2	3
1	(Ivory Coast) (Benin)	Frederic Coulibaly; Alexis Klégou	1; 6	1; 6
2	(Ivory Coast) (Benin)	Abdoulaziz Bationo; Sylvestre Monnou	6; 1	6; 1
3	(Ivory Coast) (Benin)	Frederic Coulibaly / Myko Yohann Himad Kouame; Alexis Klégou / Sylvestre Monnou	2; 6	2; 6

=== Zimbabwe vs. Ivory Coast ===
Zimbabwe
3
National Tennis Centre, Abuja, Nigeria
17 July 2024
Hard

Ivory Coast
0

			1	2	3
1	(Zimbabwe) (Ivory Coast)	Courtney John Lock; Francky Martial Hoimian	6; 4	7; 5
2	(Zimbabwe) (Ivory Coast)	Benjamin Lock; Myko Yohann Himad Kouame	6; 1	6; 0
3	(Zimbabwe) (Ivory Coast)	Benjamin Lock / Courtney John Lock; Francky Martial Hoimian / Myko Yohann Himad Kouame	6; 2	6; 2

=== Namibia vs. Nigeria ===
Namibia
3
National Tennis Centre, Abuja, Nigeria
17 July 2024
Hard

Nigeria
0

			1	2	3
1	(Namibia) (Nigeria)	Codie Schalk Van Schalkwyk; Wilson Oswalele Igbinovia	6; 1	6; 1
2	(Namibia) (Nigeria)	Connor Henry Van Schalkwyk; Christopher Bulus	3; 6	7^{7} 6^{5}	6; 1
3	(Namibia) (Nigeria)	Jean Erasmus / Codie Schalk Van Schalkwyk; Daniel Adeleye / Michael Emmanuel	7^{7} 6^{4}	6; 3

=== Benin vs. Ghana ===
Benin
3
National Tennis Centre, Abuja, Nigeria
17 July 2024
Hard

Ghana
0

			1	2	3
1	(Benin) (Ghana)	Alexis Klégou; Isaac Nortey	6; 4	6; 2
2	(Benin) (Ghana)	Sylvestre Monnou; Abraham Asaba	6; 3	6; 2
3	(Benin) (Ghana)	Prince Gandonou / Sylvestre Monnou; Samuel Agbesi Osei Antwi / Isaac Nortey	6^{6} 7^{8}	6; 4	7^{11} 6^{9}

=== Zimbabwe vs. Ghana ===
Zimbabwe
2
National Tennis Centre, Abuja, Nigeria
18 July 2024
Hard

Ghana
1

			1	2	3
1	(Zimbabwe) (Ghana)	Lyle Zaloumis; Isaac Nortey	1; 6	4; 6
2	(Zimbabwe) (Ghana)	Benjamin Lock; Abraham Asaba	6; 1	6; 4
3	(Zimbabwe) (Ghana)	Benjamin Lock / Courtney John Lock; Abraham Asaba / Isaac Nortey	3; 6	6; 4	6; 3

=== Namibia vs. Benin ===
Namibia
3
National Tennis Centre, Abuja, Nigeria
18 July 2024
Hard

Benin
0

			1	2	3
1	(Namibia) (Benin)	Codie Schalk Van Schalkwyk; Alexis Klégou	7^{8} 6^{6}			retired
2	(Namibia) (Benin)	Connor Henry Van Schalkwyk; Sylvestre Monnou	6; 2	6; 3
3	(Namibia) (Benin)	Jean Erasmus / Connor Henry Van Schalkwyk; Prince Gandonou / Sodick Noudogbessi	2; 6	6; 4	6; 1

=== Ivory Coast vs. Nigeria ===
Ivory Coast
0
National Tennis Centre, Abuja, Nigeria
18 July 2024
Hard

Nigeria
3

			1	2	3
1	(Ivory Coast) (Nigeria)	Francky Martial Hoimian; Michael Emmanuel	1; 6	3; 6
2	(Ivory Coast) (Nigeria)	Frederic Coulibaly; Christopher Bulus	0; 6	1; 6
3	(Ivory Coast) (Nigeria)	Frederic Coulibaly / Francky Martial Hoimian; Daniel Adeleye / Christopher Bulus	2; 6	6^{1} 7^{7}

=== Zimbabwe vs. Namibia ===
Zimbabwe
2
National Tennis Centre, Abuja, Nigeria
19–20 July 2024
Hard

Namibia
1

			1	2	3
1	(Zimbabwe) (Namibia)	Lyle Zaloumis; Codie Schalk Van Schalkwyk	0; 6	6^{0} 7^{7}
2	(Zimbabwe) (Namibia)	Benjamin Lock; Connor Henry Van Schalkwyk	6; 1	6^{3} 7^{7}	6; 3
3	(Zimbabwe) (Namibia)	Benjamin Lock / Courtney John Lock; Jean Erasmus / Codie Schalk Van Schalkwyk	6; 3	5; 7	7^{7} 6^{3}

=== Ivory Coast vs. Ghana ===
Ivory Coast
0
National Tennis Centre, Abuja, Nigeria
20 July 2024
Hard

Ghana
3

			1	2	3
1	(Ivory Coast) (Ghana)	Myko Yohann Himad Kouame; Samuel Agbesi Osei Antwi	7; 5	0; 6	2; 6
2	(Ivory Coast) (Ghana)	Abdoulaziz Bationo; Abraham Asaba	6; 3	5; 7	5; 7
3	(Ivory Coast) (Ghana)	Abdoulaziz Bationo / Myko Yohann Himad Kouame; Samuel Agbesi Osei Antwi / Lameck Bagerbaseh	6^{7} 7^{9}	5; 7

=== Benin vs. Nigeria ===
Benin
0
National Tennis Centre, Abuja, Nigeria
20 July 2024
Hard

Nigeria
3

			1	2	3
1	(Benin) (Nigeria)	Sylvestre Monnou; Michael Emmanuel	4; 6	7; 5	5; 7
2	(Benin) (Nigeria)	Prince Gandonou; Christopher Bulus	4; 6	0; 6
3	(Benin) (Nigeria)	Prince Gandonou / Morgane Segodo; Daniel Adeleye / Christopher Bulus	1; 6	2; 6

=== Zimbabwe vs. Benin ===
Zimbabwe
2
National Tennis Centre, Abuja, Nigeria
20–21 July 2024
Hard

Benin
1

			1	2	3
1	(Zimbabwe) (Benin)	Lyle Zaloumis; Sylvestre Monnou	0; 6	3; 6
2	(Zimbabwe) (Benin)	Benjamin Lock; Prince Gandonou	6; 1	6; 1
3	(Zimbabwe) (Benin)	Benjamin Lock / Courtney John Lock; Prince Gandonou / Sylvestre Monnou	6; 4	6; 4

=== Namibia vs. Ivory Coast ===
Namibia
3
National Tennis Centre, Abuja, Nigeria
20 July 2024
Hard

Ivory Coast
0

			1	2	3
1	(Namibia) (Ivory Coast)	Codie Schalk Van Schalkwyk; Francky Martial Hoimian	6; 4	6; 1
2	(Namibia) (Ivory Coast)	Connor Henry Van Schalkwyk; Frederic Coulibaly	6; 0	6; 3
3	(Namibia) (Ivory Coast)	Jean Erasmus / Connor Henry Van Schalkwyk; Frederic Coulibaly / Francky Martial Hoimian	6; 1	6; 1

=== Ghana vs. Nigeria ===
Ghana
1
National Tennis Centre, Abuja, Nigeria
20 July 2024
Hard

Nigeria
2

			1	2	3
1	(Ghana) (Nigeria)	Isaac Nortey; Michael Emmanuel	3; 6	2; 6
2	(Ghana) (Nigeria)	Abraham Asaba; Christopher Bulus	3; 6	2; 6
3	(Ghana) (Nigeria)	Samuel Agbesi Osei Antwi / Abraham Asaba; Wilson Oswalele Igbinovia / Uchenna Oparaoji	6; 3			retired

== Final placements ==
Placing	Teams
Promoted/First	Namibia
Promoted/Second	Nigeria
Promoted/Third	Zimbabwe
Fourth	Benin
Relegated/Fifth	Ghana
Relegated/Sixth	Ivory Coast

- Namibia, Nigeria and Zimbabwe were promoted to 2025 Davis Cup World Group II play-offs and Benin were also promoted as one of the four highest-ranked non-promoted teams in each 2024 Regional Group III event.
- Ghana and Ivory Coast were relegated to 2025 Davis Cup Africa Zone Group IV.
