= 2019 Davis Cup Europe/Africa Zone Group I =

International tennis competition

The Europe/Africa Zone was one of the three regional zones of the 2019 Davis Cup.

In the Europe/Africa Zone there are three different tiers, called groups. The winners of the Group I ties in September will earn a place in the 2020 Davis Cup Qualifiers, while the remaining nations in Groups I and II will be allocated a place within their region depending on their position in the Nations Ranking.

== Participating nations ==
Seeds:

1. Czech Republic
2. Sweden
3. Austria
4. Hungary
5. Switzerland
6. Portugal

Remaining nations:

- Belarus
- Bosnia and Herzegovina
- Finland
- Israel
- Slovakia
- Ukraine

== Results summary ==
Home team	Score	Away team	Location	Venue	Surface
Bosnia and Herzegovina	2–3	Czech Republic [1]	Zenica	Arena Zenica	Hard (i)
Sweden [2]	3–1	Israel	Stockholm	Kungliga tennishallen	Hard (i)
Finland	2–3	Austria [3]	Espoo	Espoo Metro Areena	Hard (i)
Hungary [4]	3–2	Ukraine	Budapest	Sport 11 Sports, Leisure and Event Center	Clay
Slovakia	3–1	Switzerland [5]	Bratislava	AXA Aréna NTC	Clay
Belarus	3–2	Portugal [6]	Minsk	Republic Olympic Tennis Center	Hard (i)

== Results ==
=== Bosnia and Herzegovina vs. Czech Republic ===
Bosnia and Herzegovina
2
Arena Zenica, Zenica, Bosnia and Herzegovina
14–15 September 2019
Hard (i)

Czech Republic
3

			1	2	3
1	(Bosnia and Herzegovina) (Czech Republic)	Mirza Bašić; Jonáš Forejtek	5; 7	4; 6
2	(Bosnia and Herzegovina) (Czech Republic)	Tomislav Brkić; Jiří Veselý	2; 6	6^{4} 7^{7}
3	(Bosnia and Herzegovina) (Czech Republic)	Mirza Bašić / Tomislav Brkić; Jiří Lehečka / Jiří Veselý	7^{7} 6^{2}	6; 3
4	(Bosnia and Herzegovina) (Czech Republic)	Mirza Bašić; Jiří Veselý	7^{9} 6^{7}	6; 3
5	(Bosnia and Herzegovina) (Czech Republic)	Tomislav Brkić; Jonáš Forejtek	1; 6	7^{9} 6^{7}	1; 6

=== Sweden vs. Israel ===
Sweden
3
Kungliga tennishallen, Stockholm, Sweden
13–14 September 2019
Hard (i)

Israel
1

			1	2	3
1	(Sweden) (Israel)	Mikael Ymer; Edan Leshem	6; 3	7; 5
2	(Sweden) (Israel)	Markus Eriksson; Dudi Sela	7^{8} 6^{6}	6; 0
3	(Sweden) (Israel)	Markus Eriksson / André Göransson; Daniel Cukierman / Jonathan Erlich	0; 6	2; 6
4	(Sweden) (Israel)	Mikael Ymer; Daniel Cukierman	6; 4	6; 3
5	(Sweden) (Israel)	Markus Eriksson; Edan Leshem				not played

=== Finland vs. Austria ===
Finland
2
Espoo Metro Areena, Espoo, Finland
13–14 September 2019
Hard (i)

Austria
3

			1	2	3
1	(Finland) (Austria)	Patrik Niklas-Salminen; Dominic Thiem	3; 6	4; 6
2	(Finland) (Austria)	Emil Ruusuvuori; Sebastian Ofner	6; 3	6; 4
3	(Finland) (Austria)	Henri Kontinen / Emil Ruusuvuori; Oliver Marach / Jürgen Melzer	6^{5} 7^{7}	2; 6
4	(Finland) (Austria)	Emil Ruusuvuori; Dominic Thiem	6; 3	6; 2
5	(Finland) (Austria)	Harri Heliövaara; Dennis Novak	6; 3	3; 6	6^{5} 7^{7}

=== Hungary vs. Ukraine ===
Hungary
3
Sport 11 Sports, Leisure and Event Center, Budapest, Hungary
14–16 September 2019
Clay

Ukraine
2

			1	2	3
1	(Hungary) (Ukraine)	Attila Balázs; Sergiy Stakhovsky	4; 6	3; 6
2	(Hungary) (Ukraine)	Márton Fucsovics; Illya Marchenko	6; 3	6; 2
3	(Hungary) (Ukraine)	Attila Balázs / Márton Fucsovics; Denys Molchanov / Sergiy Stakhovsky	7^{7} 6^{1}	3; 6	6; 3
4	(Hungary) (Ukraine)	Márton Fucsovics; Sergiy Stakhovsky	7; 5	3; 6	6^{3} 7^{7}
5	(Hungary) (Ukraine)	Attila Balázs; Illya Marchenko	6; 4	7; 5

=== Slovakia vs. Switzerland ===
Slovakia
3
AXA Aréna NTC, Bratislava, Slovakia
13–14 September 2019
Clay

Switzerland
1

			1	2	3
1	(Slovakia) (Switzerland)	Martin Kližan; Sandro Ehrat	2; 6	6^{7} 7^{9}
2	(Slovakia) (Switzerland)	Andrej Martin; Henri Laaksonen	6; 2	4; 6	7; 5
3	(Slovakia) (Switzerland)	Filip Polášek / Igor Zelenay; Jérôme Kym / Henri Laaksonen	6; 3	6; 3
4	(Slovakia) (Switzerland)	Norbert Gombos; Henri Laaksonen	6; 1	6; 1
5	(Slovakia) (Switzerland)	Andrej Martin; Sandro Ehrat				not played

=== Belarus vs. Portugal ===
Belarus
3
Republic Olympic Tennis Center, Minsk, Belarus
13–14 September 2019
Hard (i)

Portugal
2

			1	2	3
1	(Belarus) (Portugal)	Ilya Ivashka; João Sousa	6; 4	1; 6	2; 6
2	(Belarus) (Portugal)	Egor Gerasimov; João Domingues	6; 2	6; 3
3	(Belarus) (Portugal)	Ilya Ivashka / Andrei Vasilevski; João Sousa / Pedro Sousa	3; 6	6^{6} 7^{8}
4	(Belarus) (Portugal)	Egor Gerasimov; João Sousa	7^{7} 6^{3}	6; 4
5	(Belarus) (Portugal)	Ilya Ivashka; Pedro Sousa	6; 4	7^{7} 6^{4}
