= 2019 Davis Cup Europe/Africa Zone Group II =

International tennis competition

The Europe/Africa Zone will be one of the three regional zones of the 2019 Davis Cup.

In the Europe/Africa Zone there are three different tiers, called groups. The winners of the Group I ties in September will earn a place in the 2020 Davis Cup Qualifiers, while the remaining nations in Groups I and II will be allocated a place within their region depending on their position in the Nations Ranking.

== Participating nations ==
Seeds:

1. Romania
2. South Africa
3. Denmark
4. Lithuania
5. Egypt
6. Norway

Remaining nations:

- Bulgaria
- Georgia
- Morocco
- Slovenia
- Turkey
- Zimbabwe

== Results summary ==
Home team	Score	Away team	Location	Venue	Surface
Romania [1]	4–1	Zimbabwe	Piatra Neamț	Polyvalent Hall	Hard (i)
South Africa [2]	4–1	Bulgaria	Cape Town	Kelvin Grove Club	Hard
Denmark [3]	2–3	Turkey	Risskov	Vejlby-Risskov Hallen	Hard (i)
Morocco	2–3	Lithuania [4]	Marrakesh	Royal Tennis Club de Marrakech	Clay
Egypt [5]	1–3	Slovenia	Cairo	Gezira Sporting Club	Clay
Norway [6]	3–1	Georgia	Oslo	Njård Tennisklubb	Clay

== Results ==
=== Romania vs. Zimbabwe ===
Romania
4
Polyvalent Hall, Piatra Neamț, Romania
5–6 April 2019
Hard (indoor)

Zimbabwe
1

			1	2	3
1	(Romania) (Zimbabwe)	Marius Copil; Benjamin Lock	4; 6	5; 7
2	(Romania) (Zimbabwe)	Dragoș Dima; Takanyi Garanganga	6; 3	6; 3
3	(Romania) (Zimbabwe)	Florin Mergea / Horia Tecău; Benjamin Lock / Courtney John Lock	6; 1	6; 4
4	(Romania) (Zimbabwe)	Marius Copil; Takanyi Garanganga	6; 4	7; 5
5	(Romania) (Zimbabwe)	Filip Cristian Jianu; Mehluli Don Ayanda Sibanda	6; 3	7; 5

=== South Africa vs. Bulgaria ===
South Africa
4
Kelvin Grove Club, Cape Town, South Africa
13–14 September 2019
Hard

Bulgaria
1

			1	2	3
1	(South Africa) (Bulgaria)	Lloyd Harris; Alexandar Lazarov	6; 4	6^{3} 7^{7}	6; 3
2	(South Africa) (Bulgaria)	Ruan Roelofse; Dimitar Kuzmanov	5; 7	5; 7
3	(South Africa) (Bulgaria)	Raven Klaasen / Ruan Roelofse; Alexander Donski / Alexandar Lazarov	6; 3	6; 2
4	(South Africa) (Bulgaria)	Lloyd Harris; Dimitar Kuzmanov	6; 3	7^{7} 6^{3}
5	(South Africa) (Bulgaria)	Philip Henning; Gabriel Donev	6; 2	6; 3

=== Denmark vs. Turkey ===
Denmark
2
Vejlby-Risskov Hallen, Risskov, Denmark
13–14 September 2019
Hard (indoor)

Turkey
3

			1	2	3
1	(Denmark) (Turkey)	Christian Sigsgaard; Cem İlkel	6^{4} 7^{7}	7^{7} 6^{2}	2; 6
2	(Denmark) (Turkey)	Holger Rune; Altuğ Çelikbilek	4; 6	6; 1	6^{5} 7^{7}
3	(Denmark) (Turkey)	Johannes Ingildsen / Frederik Nielsen; Sarp Ağabigün / Altuğ Çelikbilek	6^{1} 7^{7}	6; 3	6; 4
4	(Denmark) (Turkey)	Holger Rune; Cem İlkel	7^{7} 6^{4}	6; 4
5	(Denmark) (Turkey)	Christian Sigsgaard; Altuğ Çelikbilek	1; 6	6^{5} 7^{7}

=== Morocco vs. Lithuania ===
Morocco
2
Royal Tennis Club de Marrakech, Marrakesh, Morocco
5–6 April 2019
Clay

Lithuania
3

			1	2	3
1	(Morocco) (Lithuania)	Adam Moundir; Ričardas Berankis	2; 6	6^{5} 7^{7}
2	(Morocco) (Lithuania)	Lamine Ouahab; Laurynas Grigelis	6; 2	6; 0
3	(Morocco) (Lithuania)	Anas Fattar / Lamine Ouahab; Laurynas Grigelis / Julius Tverijonas	2; 6	6; 3	6; 2
4	(Morocco) (Lithuania)	Lamine Ouahab; Ričardas Berankis	5; 7	2; 6
5	(Morocco) (Lithuania)	Amine Ahouda; Laurynas Grigelis	4; 6	2; 6

=== Egypt vs. Slovenia ===
Egypt
1
Gezira Sporting Club, Cairo, Egypt
13–14 September 2019
Clay

Slovenia
3

			1	2	3
1	(Egypt) (Slovenia)	Karim-Mohamed Maamoun; Aljaž Bedene	5; 7	1; 4		retired
2	(Egypt) (Slovenia)	Mohamed Safwat; Blaž Rola	6; 4	1; 6	7^{7} 6^{4}
3	(Egypt) (Slovenia)	Sherif Sabry / Mohamed Safwat; Aljaž Bedene / Blaž Rola	5; 7	3; 6
4	(Egypt) (Slovenia)	Mohamed Safwat; Aljaž Bedene	5; 7	5; 7
5	(Egypt) (Slovenia)	Karim-Mohamed Maamoun; Blaž Rola				not played

=== Norway vs. Georgia ===
Norway
3
Njård Tennisklubb, Oslo, Norway
13–14 September 2019
Clay

Georgia
1

			1	2	3
1	(Norway) (Georgia (country))	Viktor Durasovic; Aleksandre Metreveli	5; 7	4; 6
2	(Norway) (Georgia (country))	Casper Ruud; George Tsivadze	6; 1	6; 0
3	(Norway) (Georgia (country))	Viktor Durasovic / Casper Ruud; Aleksandre Bakshi / Aleksandre Metreveli	6; 4	6; 3
4	(Norway) (Georgia (country))	Casper Ruud; Aleksandre Metreveli	6; 3	6; 2
5	(Norway) (Georgia (country))	Viktor Durasovic; George Tsivadze				not played
