= Herve Antchandie =

Gabonese tennis player

- Country (sports): Gabon (2019–current); France (2012–19)
- Born: 23 November 1995 (age 29); Dijon, France
- Plays: Right-handed (two-handed backhand)
- Prize money: $3,594

Singles
- Career record: 0–0 (at ATP Tour level, Grand Slam level)
- Career titles: 0; 0 Challenger, 0 Futures
- Highest ranking: No. 1,425 (22 December 2014)

Doubles
- Career record: 0–0 (at ATP Tour level, Grand Slam level)
- Career titles: 0; 0 Challenger, 0 Futures
- Highest ranking: No. 1,873 (16 September 2019)

Team competitions
- Davis Cup: 1–2
- Last updated on: 30 December 2019.

Herve Antchandie (born 24 September 2001) is a Gabonese tennis player.

Antchandie has a career high ATP singles ranking of 1,425, achieved on 22 December 2014. He also has a career high ATP doubles ranking of 1,873, which was achieved on 16 September 2019.

Antchandie has represented Gabon at Davis Cup, where he has a win-loss record of 1–2.

== Davis Cup ==
=== Participations: (1–2) ===
Group membership World Group (0–0) WG Play-off (0–0) Group I (0–0) Group II (0–0) Group III (0–0) Group IV (1–2)	Matches by surface Hard (1–2) Clay (0–0) Grass (0–0) Carpet (0–0)	Matches by type Singles (0–1) Doubles (1–1)

- ▲ ▼ indicates the outcome of the Davis Cup match followed by the score, date, place of event, the zonal classification and its phase, and the court surface.

Rubber outcome	No.	Rubber	Match type (partner if any)	Opponent nation	Opponent player(s)	Score
▼0–3; 26 June 2019; Complexe Sportif Concorde de Kintele, Brazzaville, Congo; Europe/Africa Zone Group IV Round Robin; Hard surface
Defeat	1	III	Doubles (with Lyold Obiang Ondo)	Ghana	Isaac Nortey / Benjamin Palm	6–2, 6–7^{(1–7)}, 6–7^{(4–7)}
▼1–2; 27 June 2019; Complexe Sportif Concorde de Kintele, Brazzaville, Congo; Europe/Africa Zone Group IV Round Robin; Hard surface
Defeat	2	II	Singles	Cameroon	Nkwenti Ngwohoh	3–6, 4–6
Victory	3	III	Doubles (with Wilfrid Lebendje)	Cameroon	Dieu Ne Dort Midzie / Étienne Teboh	6–3, 7–5
