= 2024 Davis Cup Africa Zone Group V =

Davis Cup competition in 2024

The Africa Zone was the unique zone within Group 5 of the regional Davis Cup competition in 2024. The zone's competition was held in round robin format in Gaborone, Botswana from 17 to 20 July 2024.

== Participating nations ==
- Botswana
- Congo
- Djibouti
- Ethiopia
- Gabon
- Lesotho
- Libya
- Madagascar
- Mauritania
- Mauritius
- Mozambique
- Seychelles
- Sudan
- Tanzania
- Uganda

== Draw ==
Date: 17–20 July 2024

Location: National Tennis Centre, Gaborone, Botswana (Hard)

Format: Round-robin basis. Three pools of four teams and one pool of three teams and nations will play each team once in their pool. Nations finishing first of each pool will enter promotional play-offs, with the first of Pool A facing the first of Pool D and the first of Pool B facing the first of Pool C, and the two winners will be promoted to Africa Zone Group IV in 2025.

=== Seeding ===
Pot	Nation	Rank^{1}	Seed
1	Mozambique	132	1
1	Gabon	133	2
1	Botswana	134	3
1	Congo	138	4
2	Tanzania	140	5
2	Mauritius	142=	6
2	Ethiopia	142=	7
2	Madagascar	146=	8
2	Lesotho	146=	9
2	Uganda	150	10
2	Sudan	151	11
2	Seychelles	155=	12
2	Djibouti	159	13
2	Mauritania	NR	14
2	Libya	NR	15

- ^{1}Davis Cup Rankings as of 18 March 2024

=== Round Robin ===
==== Pool A ====
		MOZ	TAN	DJI	RR; W–L	Set; W–L	Game; W–L	Standings
1	Mozambique		2–1	3–0	2–0	5–1 (%)	– (%)	1
5	Tanzania	1–2		3–0	1–1	4–2 (%)	– (%)	2
13	Djibouti	0–3	0–3		0–2	0–6 (%)	– (%)	3

==== Pool B ====
		GAB	UGA	SUD	SEY	RR; W–L	Set; W–L	Game; W–L	Standings
2	Gabon		2–1	2–1	3–0	3–0	7–2 (%)	– (%)	1
10	Uganda	1–2		3–0	3–0	2–1	7–2 (%)	– (%)	2
11	Sudan	1–2	0–3		3–0	1–2	4–5 (%)	– (%)	3
12	Seychelles	0–3	0–3	0–3		0–3	0–9 (%)	– (%)	4

==== Pool C ====
		BOT	MAD	LES	LBA	RR; W–L	Set; W–L	Game; W–L	Standings
3	Botswana		2–1	3–0	3–0	3–0	8–1 (%)	– (%)	1
8	Madagascar	1–2		3–0	3–0	2–1	7–2 (%)	– (%)	2
9	Lesotho	0–3	0–3		2–1	1–2	2–7 (%)	– (%)	3
15	Libya	0–3	0–3	1–2		0–3	1–8 (%)	– (%)	4

==== Pool D ====
		MRI	ETH	MTN	CGO	RR; W–L	Set; W–L	Game; W–L	Standings
6	Mauritius		3–0	3–0	3–0	3–0	9–0 (%)	– (%)	1
7	Ethiopia	0–3		3–0	3–0	2–1	6–3 (%)	– (%)	2
14	Mauritania	0–3	0–3		3–0	1–2	3–6 (%)	– (%)	3
4	Congo	0–3	0–3	0–3		0–3	0–9 (%)	– (%)	4

Standings are determined by: 1. number of wins; 2. number of matches; 3. in two-team ties, head-to-head records; 4. in three-team ties, (a) percentage of sets won (head-to-head records if two teams remain tied), then (b) percentage of games won (head-to-head records if two teams remain tied), then (c) Davis Cup rankings.

=== Playoffs ===
Placing	A Team	Score	B Team
Promotional	Botswana	1–2	Gabon
Promotional	Mozambique	1–2	Mauritius
Fifth	Madagascar	2–0	Uganda
Seventh	Tanzania	0–2	Ethiopia
Ninth	Lesotho	2–0	Sudan
Eleventh	Djibouti	0–3	Mauritania
Thirteenth	Seychelles	0–2	Congo

- Gabon and Mauritius were promoted to 2025 Davis Cup Africa Zone Group IV.

== Round Robin ==
=== Pool A ===
==== Djibouti vs. Tanzania ====
Djibouti
0
National Tennis Centre, Gaborone, Botswana
17 July 2024
Hard

Tanzania
3

			1	2	3
1	(Djibouti) (Tanzania)	Ali Idriss Issa; Rahim Rashidi	2; 6	0; 6
2	(Djibouti) (Tanzania)	Osman Omar Ali; Yusuph Godwin	0; 6	2; 6
3	(Djibouti) (Tanzania)	Tannwir Abdoul-Bari / Dante Collaros; Japhet Pancrass / Hamisi Shomvi	2; 6	0; 6

==== Mozambique vs. Djibouti ====
Mozambique
3
National Tennis Centre, Gaborone, Botswana
18 July 2024
Hard

Djibouti
0

			1	2	3
1	(Mozambique) (Djibouti)	Luca Santiago De Sousa Figueiredo; Ali Idriss Issa	6; 0	6; 0
2	(Mozambique) (Djibouti)	Armando Sigauque; Osman Omar Ali	6; 1	6; 2
3	(Mozambique) (Djibouti)	Jose Joao Cossa / Bruno Figueiredo; Dante Collaros / Osman Omar Ali	6; 3	6; 0

==== Mozambique vs. Tanzania ====
Mozambique
2
National Tennis Centre, Gaborone, Botswana
19 July 2024
Hard

Tanzania
1

			1	2	3
1	(Mozambique) (Tanzania)	Armando Sigauque; Yusuph Godwin	6; 2	6; 3
2	(Mozambique) (Tanzania)	Jose Joao Cossa; Hamisi Shomvi	0; 6	5; 7
3	(Mozambique) (Tanzania)	Luca Santiago De Sousa Figueiredo / Armando Sigauque; Japhet Pancrass / Hamisi Shomvi	6; 3	6; 3

=== Pool B ===
==== Gabon vs. Seychelles ====
Gabon
3
National Tennis Centre, Gaborone, Botswana
17 July 2024
Hard

Seychelles
0

			1	2	3
1	(Gabon) (Seychelles)	Herve Antchandie; Mikael Vince Gomme	6; 0	6; 0
2	(Gabon) (Seychelles)	Lyold Obiang Ondo; Matteo Lavigne	6; 1	6; 0
3	(Gabon) (Seychelles)	Rene Antchandie / Willy Lebendje; Kelian Ah-Kon / Mikael Vince Gomme	6; 0	6; 0

==== Uganda vs. Sudan ====
Uganda
3
National Tennis Centre, Gaborone, Botswana
17 July 2024
Hard

Sudan
0

			1	2	3
1	(Uganda) (Sudan)	Marvin Kiriwo; Husam Ali	6; 0	6; 2
2	(Uganda) (Sudan)	Frank Tayebwa; Khalid Derar	6; 1	6; 1
3	(Uganda) (Sudan)	Simon Peter Ayella / Troy Adrian Zziwa; Husam Ali / Khalid Derar	2; 6	6; 3	6; 4

==== Gabon vs. Sudan ====
Gabon
2
National Tennis Centre, Gaborone, Botswana
18 July 2024
Hard

Sudan
1

			1	2	3
1	(Gabon) (Sudan)	Herve Antchandie; Husam Ali	6; 0	6; 0
2	(Gabon) (Sudan)	Lyold Obiang Ondo; Khalid Derar	6; 2	4; 6	5; 7
3	(Gabon) (Sudan)	Herve Antchandie / Lyold Obiang Ondo; Husam Ali / Khalid Derar	7^{7} 6^{5}	6; 4

==== Uganda vs. Seychelles ====
Uganda
3
National Tennis Centre, Gaborone, Botswana
18 July 2024
Hard

Seychelles
0

			1	2	3
1	(Uganda) (Seychelles)	Marvin Kiriwo; Mikael Vince Gomme	6; 0	6; 0
2	(Uganda) (Seychelles)	Frank Tayebwa; Matteo Lavigne	6; 1	6; 2
3	(Uganda) (Seychelles)	Simon Peter Ayella / Troy Adrian Zziwa; Kelian Ah-Kon / Mikael Vince Gomme	6; 0	6; 1

==== Gabon vs. Uganda ====
Gabon
2
National Tennis Centre, Gaborone, Botswana
19 July 2024
Hard

Uganda
1

			1	2	3
1	(Gabon) (Uganda)	Herve Antchandie; Marvin Kiriwo	6; 2	6; 2
2	(Gabon) (Uganda)	Lyold Obiang Ondo; Frank Tayebwa	6; 4	3; 6	6^{5} 7^{7}
3	(Gabon) (Uganda)	Herve Antchandie / Rene Antchandie; Simon Peter Ayella / Frank Tayebwa	6; 2	6; 3

==== Sudan vs.Seychelles ====
Sudan
3
National Tennis Centre, Gaborone, Botswana
19 July 2024
Hard

Seychelles
0

			1	2	3
1	(Sudan) (Seychelles)	Husam Ali; Kelian Ah-Kon	6; 0	6; 0
2	(Sudan) (Seychelles)	Khalid Derar; Matteo Lavigne	6; 1	6; 1
3	(Sudan) (Seychelles)	Husam Ali / Khalid Derar; Mikael Vince Gomme / Matteo Lavigne	7^{7} 6^{4}	6; 0

=== Pool C ===
==== Botswana vs. Libya ====
Botswana
3
National Tennis Centre, Gaborone, Botswana
17 July 2024
Hard

Libya
0

			1	2	3
1	(Botswana) (Libya)	Mark Nawa; Ahmed Mouhan	6^{4} 7^{7}	6; 4	7^{7} 6^{3}
2	(Botswana) (Libya)	Denzel Seetso; Mohamed Eljamal	6; 0	6; 0
3	(Botswana) (Libya)	Batsomi Marobela / Denzel Seetso; Mohammed Alriqeeq / Ahmed Mouhan	7^{7} 6^{4}	6; 0

==== Madagascar vs. Lesotho ====
Madagascar
3
National Tennis Centre, Gaborone, Botswana
17 July 2024
Hard

Lesotho
0

			1	2	3
1	(Madagascar) (Lesotho)	Valentin Rakotondrasoa; Bishop Mosebi	6; 1	6; 1
2	(Madagascar) (Lesotho)	Dylan Andrianaly Narinavalona; Mpho Leshoele	6; 4	7; 5
3	(Madagascar) (Lesotho)	Antso Rakotondramanga / Valentin Rakotondrasoa; Mpho Leshoele / Bishop Mosebi	6; 3	6; 0

==== Botswana vs. Lesotho ====
Botswana
3
National Tennis Centre, Gaborone, Botswana
18 July 2024
Hard

Lesotho
0

			1	2	3
1	(Botswana) (Lesotho)	Mark Nawa; Bishop Mosebi	6; 1	3; 6	6; 4
2	(Botswana) (Lesotho)	Denzel Seetso; Mpho Leshoele	6; 4	6; 4
3	(Botswana) (Lesotho)	Esi Molefe / Tsholofelo Tsiang; Mpho Leshoele / Bishop Mosebi	7^{7} 6^{5}	6; 2

==== Madagascar vs. Libya ====
Madagascar
3
National Tennis Centre, Gaborone, Botswana
18 July 2024
Hard

Libya
0

			1	2	3
1	(Madagascar) (Libya)	Antso Rakotondramanga; Mohammed Alriqeeq	6; 1	6; 1
2	(Madagascar) (Libya)	Valentin Rakotondrasoa; Mohamed Lamami	6; 1	6; 0
3	(Madagascar) (Libya)	Dylan Andrianaly Narinavalona / Nicolas Raharivony; Mohammed Alriqeeq / Mohamed Eljamal	6; 2	7; 5

==== Botswana vs. Madagascar ====
Botswana
2
National Tennis Centre, Gaborone, Botswana
19 July 2024
Hard

Madagascar
1

			1	2	3
1	(Botswana) (Madagascar)	Mark Nawa; Valentin Rakotondrasoa	3; 6	0; 6
2	(Botswana) (Madagascar)	Denzel Seetso; Dylan Andrianaly Narinavalona	6; 0	7; 5
3	(Botswana) (Madagascar)	Batsomi Marobela / Denzel Seetso; Antso Rakotondramanga / Valentin Rakotondrasoa	6; 4	4; 6	6; 2

==== Lesotho vs. Libya ====
Lesotho
2
National Tennis Centre, Gaborone, Botswana
19 July 2024
Hard

Libya
1

			1	2	3
1	(Lesotho) (Libya)	Bishop Mosebi; Ahmed Mouhan	2; 6	0; 6
2	(Lesotho) (Libya)	Mpho Leshoele; Mohamed Lamami	6; 3	6; 0
3	(Lesotho) (Libya)	Mpho Leshoele / Lerato Mathibela; Mohammed Alriqeeq / Mohamed Eljamal	6; 3	6; 1

=== Pool D ===
==== Congo vs. Mauritania ====
Congo
0
National Tennis Centre, Gaborone, Botswana
17 July 2024
Hard

Mauritania
3

			1	2	3
1	(Republic of the Congo) (Mauritania)	Armel Mokobo; Mohamed El Hafedh Said	3; 6	1; 6
2	(Republic of the Congo) (Mauritania)	Cheik Pandzou Ekoumé; Mohamed Lemine Blal	7; 5	4; 6	2; 5	retired
3	(Republic of the Congo) (Mauritania)	Christ Geovhany Mezenga Lentom / Armel Mokobo; Mohamed El Hafedh Said / Oumar Youbawe	1; 6	6; 2	1; 6

==== Mauritius vs. Ethiopia ====
Mauritius
3
National Tennis Centre, Gaborone, Botswana
17 July 2024
Hard

Ethiopia
0

			1	2	3
1	(Mauritius) (Ethiopia)	Daniel Bazu; Abdella Nedim Mohammed	6; 1	6; 2
2	(Mauritius) (Ethiopia)	Loic Gebert; Yabets Kebede	6; 2	3; 6	6; 4
3	(Mauritius) (Ethiopia)	Samuel Ava / Anthony Kwok Yin Siong Yen; Dawit Musse / Dawit Fisha Uma	6; 3	6; 0

==== Congo vs. Mauritius ====
Congo
0
National Tennis Centre, Gaborone, Botswana
18 July 2024
Hard

Mauritius
3

			1	2	3
1	(Republic of the Congo) (Mauritius)	Christ Geovhany Mezenga Lentom; Daniel Bazu	1; 6	0; 6
2	(Republic of the Congo) (Mauritius)	Camille Henry Boboua; Rushil Seewoosurrun	1; 6	0; 6
3	(Republic of the Congo) (Mauritius)	Armel Mokobo / Cheik Pandzou Ekoumé; Samuel Ava / Anthony Kwok Yin Siong Yen	2; 6	4; 6

==== Ethiopia vs. Mauritania ====
Ethiopia
3
National Tennis Centre, Gaborone, Botswana
18 July 2024
Hard

Mauritania
0

			1	2	3
1	(Ethiopia) (Mauritania)	Abdella Nedim Mohammed; Mohamed El Hafedh Said	6; 2	6; 1
2	(Ethiopia) (Mauritania)	Dawit Musse; Mohamed Lemine Blal	6; 1	6; 2
3	(Ethiopia) (Mauritania)	Abdella Nedim Mohammed / Dawit Fisha Uma; Mohamed El Hafedh Said / Oumar Youbawe	6; 1	6; 3

==== Congo vs. Ethiopia ====
Congo
0
National Tennis Centre, Gaborone, Botswana
19 July 2024
Hard

Ethiopia
3

			1	2	3
1	(Republic of the Congo) (Ethiopia)	Armel Mokobo; Dawit Fisha Uma	4; 6	4; 6
2	(Republic of the Congo) (Ethiopia)	Cheik Pandzou Ekoumé; Yabets Kebede	3; 6	1; 6
3	(Republic of the Congo) (Ethiopia)	Camille Henry Boboua / Cheik Pandzou Ekoumé; Yabets Kebede / Dawit Musse	2; 6	2; 6

==== Mauritius vs. Mauritania ====
Mauritius
3
National Tennis Centre, Gaborone, Botswana
19 July 2024
Hard

Mauritania
0

			1	2	3
1	(Mauritius) (Mauritania)	Daniel Bazu; Mohamed El Hafedh Said	6; 1	6; 0
2	(Mauritius) (Mauritania)	Loic Gebert; Mohamed Lemine Blal	6; 3	6; 2
3	(Mauritius) (Mauritania)	Samuel Ava / Anthony Kwok Yin Siong Yen; Mohamed El Hafedh Said / Oumar Youbawe	6; 2	6; 2

== Play-offs ==
=== Promotional play-offs ===
==== Botswana vs. Gabon ====
Botswana
1
National Tennis Centre, Gaborone, Botswana
20 July 2024
Hard

Gabon
2

			1	2	3
1	(Botswana) (Gabon)	Mark Nawa; Rene Antchandie	6; 3	4; 6	6; 0
2	(Botswana) (Gabon)	Denzel Seetso; Herve Antchandie	6; 4	5; 7	3; 6
3	(Botswana) (Gabon)	Batsomi Marobela / Denzel Seetso; Herve Antchandie / Lyold Obiang Ondo	6^{3} 7^{7}	4; 6

==== Mozambique vs. Mauritius ====
Mozambique
1
National Tennis Centre, Gaborone, Botswana
20 July 2024
Hard

Mauritius
2

			1	2	3
1	(Mozambique) (Mauritius)	Luca Santiago De Sousa Figueiredo; Daniel Bazu	2; 6	2; 6
2	(Mozambique) (Mauritius)	Armando Sigauque; Loic Gebert	3; 6	6; 3	6; 4
3	(Mozambique) (Mauritius)	Luca Santiago De Sousa Figueiredo / Armando Sigauque; Samuel Ava / Anthony Kwok Yin Siong Yen	5; 7	2; 6

=== Fifth place play-off ===
==== Madagascar vs. Uganda ====
Madagascar
2
National Tennis Centre, Gaborone, Botswana
20 July 2024
Hard

Uganda
0

			1	2	3
1	(Madagascar) (Uganda)	Antso Rakotondramanga; Troy Adrian Zziwa	6; 0	6; 0
2	(Madagascar) (Uganda)	Valentin Rakotondrasoa; Marvin Kiriwo	6; 0	6; 0
3	(Madagascar) (Uganda)	Dylan Andrianaly Narinavalona / Nicolas Raharivony; Simon Peter Ayella / Marvin Kiriwo				not played

=== Seventh place play-off ===
==== Tanzania vs. Ethiopia ====
Tanzania
0
National Tennis Centre, Gaborone, Botswana
20 July 2024
Hard

Ethiopia
2

			1	2	3
1	(Tanzania) (Ethiopia)	Rahim Rashidi; Abdella Nedim Mohammed	2; 6	1; 6
2	(Tanzania) (Ethiopia)	Hamisi Shomvi; Dawit Musse	1; 6	4; 6
3	(Tanzania) (Ethiopia)	Yusuph Godwin / Japhet Pancrass; Yabets Kebede / Abdella Nedim Mohammed				not played

=== Ninth place play-off ===
==== Lesotho vs. Sudan ====
Lesotho
2
National Tennis Centre, Gaborone, Botswana
20 July 2024
Hard

Sudan
0

			1	2	3
1	(Lesotho) (Sudan)	Lerato Mathibela; Husam Ali	6; 4	6; 2
2	(Lesotho) (Sudan)	Mpho Leshoele; Khalid Derar	6; 3	3; 0		retired
3	(Lesotho) (Sudan)	Lerato Mathibela / Bishop Mosebi; Husam Ali / Khalid Derar				not played

=== Eleventh place play-off ===
==== Djibouti vs. Mauritania ====
Djibouti
0
National Tennis Centre, Gaborone, Botswana
20 July 2024
Hard

Mauritania
3

			1	2	3
1	(Djibouti) (Mauritania)	Ali Idriss Issa; Mohamed El Hafedh Said	0; 6	0; 6
2	(Djibouti) (Mauritania)	Osman Omar Ali; Mohamed Lemine Blal	3; 6	2; 6
3	(Djibouti) (Mauritania)	Tannwir Abdoul-Bari / Dante Collaros; Mohamed El Hafedh Said / Oumar Youbawe	0; 6	1; 6

=== Thirteenth place play-off ===
==== Seychelles vs. Congo ====
Seychelles
0
National Tennis Centre, Gaborone, Botswana
20 July 2024
Hard

Congo
2

			1	2	3
1	(Seychelles) (Republic of the Congo)	Kelian Ah-Kon; Armel Mokobo	0; 6	0; 6
2	(Seychelles) (Republic of the Congo)	Mikael Vince Gomme; Cheik Pandzou Ekoumé	0; 6	3; 6
3	(Seychelles) (Republic of the Congo)	Kelian Ah-Kon / Matteo Lavigne; Christ Geovhany Mezenga Lentom / Armel Mokobo				not played

== Final placements ==
Placing	Teams	
Promoted/First	Gabon	Mauritius
Third	Botswana	Mozambique
Fifth	Madagascar	
Sixth	Uganda	
Seventh	Ethiopia	
Eighth	Tanzania	
Ninth	Lesotho	
Tenth	Sudan	
Eleventh	Mauritania	
Twelfth	Djibouti	
Thirteenth	Congo	
Fourteenth	Seychelles	
Fifteenth	Libya	

- Gabon and Mauritius were promoted to 2025 Davis Cup Africa Zone Group IV.
