= 2021 Davis Cup Africa Zone Group IV =

Davis Cup competition in 2021

The Africa Zone was the unique zone within Group 4 of the regional Davis Cup competition in 2021. The zone's competition was held in round robin format in Brazzaville, Republic of the Congo, from 21 to 26 June 2021.

== Participating nations ==
- Angola
- Botswana
- Cameroon
- Congo
- Gabon
- Ivory Coast
- Namibia
- Nigeria
- Senegal
- Uganda

=== Inactive nations ===
- Burkina Faso
- Djibouti
- Ethiopia
- Lesotho
- Libya
- Mali
- Mauritius
- Togo
- Zambia

== Draw ==
Date: 21–26 June 2021

Location: Complexe Sportif La Concorde, Brazzaville, Republic of the Congo (hard)

Format: Round-robin basis. Two pools of five teams. The winner of each pool will play-off against the runner-up of the opposite pool to determine which two nations are promoted to Africa Group III in 2022.

=== Seeding ===
Pot	Nation	Rank^{1}	Seed
1	Namibia	106	1
1	Nigeria	113	2
2	Cameroon	115	3
2	Uganda	119	4
3	Gabon	123	5
3	Botswana	125	6
4	Congo	132	7
4	Ivory Coast	134	8
5	Senegal	134	9
5	Angola	NR	10

- ^{1}Davis Cup Rankings as of 8 March 2021

=== Round Robin ===
==== Pool A ====
		NAM	BOT	ANG	UGA	CGO	RR; W–L	Set; W–L	Game; W–L	Standings
1	Namibia		3–0	2–1	3–0	3–0	11–1	22–4 (85%)	148–60 (71%)	1
6	Botswana	0–3		3–0	3–0	3–0	9–3	19–8 (70%)	136–92 (60%)	2
10	Angola	1–2	0–3		2–1	3–0	6–7	14–12 (54%)	121–112 (52%)	3
4	Uganda	0–3	0–3	1–2		3–0	4–8	9–17 (35%)	90–122 (42%)	4
7	Congo	0–3	0–3	0–3	0–3		0–12	1–24 (4%)	41–150 (21%)	5

==== Pool B ====
		CIV	NGR	CMR	SEN	GAB	RR; W–L	Set; W–L	Game; W–L	Standings
8	Ivory Coast		3–0	2–1	3–0	2–1	10–2	21–5 (81%)	152–78 (66%)	1
2	Nigeria	0–3		2–1	3–0	3–0	8–4	18–10 (64%)	134–109 (55%)	2
3	Cameroon	1–2	1–2		2–1	3–0	7–5	17–12 (59%)	141–130 (52%)	3
9	Senegal	0–3	0–3	1–2		3–0	4–8	8–17 (32%)	99–122 (45%)	4
5	Gabon	1–2	0–3	0–3	0–3		1–11	2–22 (8%)	52–139 (27%)	5

Standings are determined by: 1. number of wins; 2. number of matches; 3. in two-team ties, head-to-head records; 4. in three-team ties, (a) percentage of sets won (head-to-head records if two teams remain tied), then (b) percentage of games won (head-to-head records if two teams remain tied), then (c) Davis Cup rankings.

=== Playoffs ===
Placing	A Team	Score	B Team
Promotional	Namibia	2–1	Nigeria
Promotional	Botswana	0–2	Ivory Coast
5th–6th	Angola	0–3	Cameroon
7th–8th	Uganda	1–2	Senegal
9th–10th	Congo	0–3	Gabon

== Round Robin ==
=== Pool A ===
==== Namibia vs. Botswana ====
Namibia
3
Complexe Sportif La Concorde, Brazzaville, Republic of Congo
21 June 2021
Hard

Botswana
0

			1	2	3
1	(Namibia) (Botswana)	Connor Henry Van Schalkwyk; Tshepo Mosarwa	7; 5	6; 1
2	(Namibia) (Botswana)	Codie Schalk Van Schalkwyk; Tsholofelo Tsiang	6; 3	6; 0
3	(Namibia) (Botswana)	Nguvitjita Hinda / Daniel Jauss; Thato Holmes / Denzel Seetso	2; 6	6; 4	6; 2

==== Angola vs. Congo ====
Angola
3
Complexe Sportif La Concorde, Brazzaville, Republic of Congo
21 June 2021
Hard

Congo
0

			1	2	3
1	(Angola) (Republic of the Congo)	Fernando André; Duhamel Franklin Biboussy	6; 2	6; 1
2	(Angola) (Republic of the Congo)	Zidario Quitomina; Brasny Ntomosso	6; 3	6; 4
3	(Angola) (Republic of the Congo)	Fernando André / Nicolau Monteiro; Christ Geovhany Mezenga Lentom / Brasny Ntomosso	6; 4	6; 1

==== Botswana vs. Angola ====
Botswana
3
Complexe Sportif La Concorde, Brazzaville, Republic of Congo
22 June 2021
Hard

Angola
0

			1	2	3
1	(Botswana) (Angola)	Denzel Seetso; Nicolau Monteiro	6; 3	6; 1
2	(Botswana) (Angola)	Tsholofelo Tsiang; Fernando André	7; 5	3; 6	6; 3
3	(Botswana) (Angola)	Thato Holmes / Tshepo Mosarwa; Fernando André / Nicolau Monteiro	6; 4	6; 2

==== Uganda vs. Congo ====
Uganda
3
Complexe Sportif La Concorde, Brazzaville, Republic of Congo
22 June 2021
Hard

Congo
0

			1	2	3
1	(Uganda) (Republic of the Congo)	Frank Tayebwa; Duhamel Franklin Biboussy	6; 0	6; 0
2	(Uganda) (Republic of the Congo)	Boris Aguma; Brasny Ntomosso	6; 1	6; 1
3	(Uganda) (Republic of the Congo)	Boris Aguma / Simon Peter Ayella; Christ Geovhany Mezenga Lentom / Brasny Ntomosso	6; 0	6; 4

==== Namibia vs. Angola ====
Namibia
2
Complexe Sportif La Concorde, Brazzaville, Republic of Congo
23 June 2021
Hard

Angola
1

			1	2	3
1	(Namibia) (Angola)	Connor Henry Van Schalkwyk; Fernando André	6; 2	6; 1
2	(Namibia) (Angola)	Codie Schalk Van Schalkwyk; Zidario Quitomina	6; 0	6; 4
3	(Namibia) (Angola)	Nguvitjita Hinda / Daniel Jauss; Fernando André / Zidario Quitomina	5; 7	2; 6

==== Uganda vs. Botswana ====
Uganda
0
Complexe Sportif La Concorde, Brazzaville, Republic of Congo
23 June 2021
Hard

Botswana
3

			1	2	3
1	(Uganda) (Botswana)	Frank Tayebwa; Denzel Seetso	2; 6	3; 6
2	(Uganda) (Botswana)	Boris Aguma; Tsholofelo Tsiang	1; 6	6; 3	4; 6
3	(Uganda) (Botswana)	Simon Peter Ayella / Edward Birungi; Thato Holmes / Tshepo Mosarwa	2; 6	4; 6

==== Namibia vs. Congo ====
Namibia
3
Complexe Sportif La Concorde, Brazzaville, Republic of Congo
24 June 2021
Hard

Congo
0

			1	2	3
1	(Namibia) (Republic of the Congo)	Connor Henry Van Schalkwyk; Duhamel Franklin Biboussy	6; 0	6; 2
2	(Namibia) (Republic of the Congo)	Codie Schalk Van Schalkwyk; Christ Geovhany Mezenga Lentom	6; 0	6; 0
3	(Namibia) (Republic of the Congo)	Nguvitjita Hinda / Daniel Jauss; Duhamel Franklin Biboussy / Brasny Ntomosso	6^{4} 7^{7}	6; 3	6; 1

==== Uganda vs. Angola ====
Uganda
1
Complexe Sportif La Concorde, Brazzaville, Republic of Congo
24 June 2021
Hard

Angola
2

			1	2	3
1	(Uganda) (Angola)	Frank Tayebwa; Fernando André	5; 7	4; 6
2	(Uganda) (Angola)	Boris Aguma; Zidario Quitomina	7^{7} 6^{5}	1; 6	6; 4
3	(Uganda) (Angola)	Boris Aguma / Simon Peter Ayella; Fernando André / Nicolau Monteiro	1; 6	2; 6

==== Namibia vs. Uganda ====
Namibia
3
Complexe Sportif La Concorde, Brazzaville, Republic of Congo
25 June 2021
Hard

Uganda
0

			1	2	3
1	(Namibia) (Uganda)	Connor Henry Van Schalkwyk; Frank Tayebwa	6; 0	6; 0
2	(Namibia) (Uganda)	Codie Schalk Van Schalkwyk; Boris Aguma	6; 1	6; 4
3	(Namibia) (Uganda)	Codie Schalk Van Schalkwyk / Connor Henry Van Schalkwyk; Boris Aguma / Simon Peter Ayella	6; 1	6; 0

==== Botswana vs. Congo ====
Botswana
3
Complexe Sportif La Concorde, Brazzaville, Republic of Congo
25 June 2021
Hard

Congo
0

			1	2	3
1	(Botswana) (Republic of the Congo)	Denzel Seetso; Christ Geovhany Mezenga Lentom	6; 0	6; 0
2	(Botswana) (Republic of the Congo)	Tsholofelo Tsiang; Brasny Ntomosso	6; 0	6; 3
3	(Botswana) (Republic of the Congo)	Thato Holmes / Tshepo Mosarwa; Duhamel Franklin Biboussy / Brasny Ntomosso	6; 2	6; 2

=== Pool B ===
==== Nigeria vs. Ivory Coast ====
Nigeria
0
Complexe Sportif La Concorde, Brazzaville, Republic of Congo
21 June 2021
Hard

Ivory Coast
3

			1	2	3
1	(Nigeria) (Ivory Coast)	Nonso Madueke; Abdoulaziz Bationo	7; 5	3; 6	0; 6
2	(Nigeria) (Ivory Coast)	Uche Oparaoji; Eliakim Coulibaly	0; 6	0; 6
3	(Nigeria) (Ivory Coast)	Abdul-Mumin Babalola / Joseph Imeh Ubon; Abdoulaziz Bationo / Eliakim Coulibaly	5; 7	4; 6

==== Cameroon vs. Senegal ====
Cameroon
2
Complexe Sportif La Concorde, Brazzaville, Republic of Congo
21 June 2021
Hard

Senegal
1

			1	2	3
1	(Cameroon) (Senegal)	Étienne Teboh; Seydina André	6; 3	7^{7} 6^{4}
2	(Cameroon) (Senegal)	Nkwenti Blaise Ngwohoh; Nicolas Jadoun	6; 4	6; 4
3	(Cameroon) (Senegal)	Boriss Kamdem / Lloyd Sergio Watat Njanga; Hassimiyou Dieng / Yannick Languina	6; 2	4; 6	4; 6

==== Cameroon vs. Ivory Coast ====
Cameroon
1
Complexe Sportif La Concorde, Brazzaville, Republic of Congo
22 June 2021
Hard

Ivory Coast
2

			1	2	3
1	(Cameroon) (Ivory Coast)	Étienne Teboh; Abdoulaziz Bationo	3; 6	3; 6
2	(Cameroon) (Ivory Coast)	Nkwenti Blaise Ngwohoh; Eliakim Coulibaly	1; 6	1; 6
3	(Cameroon) (Ivory Coast)	Boriss Kamdem / Nkwenti Blaise Ngwohoh; Abdoulaziz Bationo / Sibi Junior Soumahoro	5; 7	7^{7} 6^{3}	7; 5

==== Gabon vs. Senegal ====
Gabon
0
Complexe Sportif La Concorde, Brazzaville, Republic of Congo
22 June 2021
Hard

Senegal
3

			1	2	3
1	(Gabon) (Senegal)	Willy Lebendje; Seydina André	4; 6	2; 6
2	(Gabon) (Senegal)	Lyold Obiang Ondo; Nicolas Jadoun	2; 6	2; 6
3	(Gabon) (Senegal)	Aymar Hugor Biyamba Nzila Star / Paterne Ogombe; Seydina André / Yannick Languina	0; 6	0; 6

==== Nigeria vs. Senegal ====
Nigeria
3
Complexe Sportif La Concorde, Brazzaville, Republic of Congo
23 June 2021
Hard

Senegal
0

			1	2	3
1	(Nigeria) (Senegal)	Uche Oparaoji; Seydina André	6; 3	6; 2
2	(Nigeria) (Senegal)	Joseph Imeh Ubon; Nicolas Jadoun	6; 3	6; 4
3	(Nigeria) (Senegal)	Abdul-Mumin Babalola / Nonso Madueke; Hassimiyou Dieng / Yannick Languina	6; 2	6; 4

==== Cameroon vs. Gabon ====
Cameroon
3
Complexe Sportif La Concorde, Brazzaville, Republic of Congo
23 June 2021
Hard

Gabon
0

			1	2	3
1	(Cameroon) (Gabon)	Étienne Teboh; Willy Lebendje	6; 1	6; 2
2	(Cameroon) (Gabon)	Nkwenti Blaise Ngwohoh; Lyold Obiang Ondo	6; 3	6; 2
3	(Cameroon) (Gabon)	Boriss Kamdem / Nkwenti Blaise Ngwohoh; Willy Lebendje / Lyold Obiang Ondo	6; 4	6; 2

==== Nigeria vs. Gabon ====
Nigeria
3
Complexe Sportif La Concorde, Brazzaville, Republic of Congo
24 June 2021
Hard

Gabon
0

			1	2	3
1	(Nigeria) (Gabon)	Uche Oparaoji; Paterne Ogombe	6; 0	6; 1
2	(Nigeria) (Gabon)	Joseph Imeh Ubon; Lyold Obiang Ondo	6; 4	6; 2
3	(Nigeria) (Gabon)	Nonso Madueke / Uche Oparaoji; Aymar Hugor Biyamba Nzila Star / Paterne Ogombe	6; 2	6; 1

==== Senegal vs. Ivory Coast ====
Senegal
0
Complexe Sportif La Concorde, Brazzaville, Republic of Congo
24 June 2021
Hard

Ivory Coast
3

			1	2	3
1	(Senegal) (Ivory Coast)	Yannick Languina; Abdoulaziz Bationo	1; 6	2; 6
2	(Senegal) (Ivory Coast)	Nicolas Jadoun; Eliakim Coulibaly	2; 6	1; 6
3	(Senegal) (Ivory Coast)	Seydina André / Nicolas Jadoun; Abdoulaziz Bationo / Eliakim Coulibaly	6^{2} 7^{7}	2; 6

==== Nigeria vs. Cameroon ====
Nigeria
2
Complexe Sportif La Concorde, Brazzaville, Republic of Congo
25 June 2021
Hard

Cameroon
1

			1	2	3
1	(Nigeria) (Cameroon)	Uche Oparaoji; Étienne Teboh	6; 4	2; 6	6; 1
2	(Nigeria) (Cameroon)	Joseph Imeh Ubon; Nkwenti Blaise Ngwohoh	6; 2	4; 6	6; 4
3	(Nigeria) (Cameroon)	Abdul-Mumin Babalola / Nonso Madueke; Boriss Kamdem / Lloyd Sergio Watat Njanga	6; 4	3; 6	4; 6

==== Gabon vs. Ivory Coast ====
Gabon
1
Complexe Sportif La Concorde, Brazzaville, Republic of Congo
25 June 2021
Hard

Ivory Coast
2

			1	2	3
1	(Gabon) (Ivory Coast)	Aymar Hugor Biyamba Nzila Star; Abdoulaziz Bationo	0; 6	0; 6
2	(Gabon) (Ivory Coast)	Lyold Obiang Ondo; Eliakim Coulibaly	2; 6	3; 6
3	(Gabon) (Ivory Coast)	Willy Lebendje / Lyold Obiang Ondo; Kouadio Guillaume Koffi / Sibi Junior Soumahoro	6; 1	7^{7} 6^{4}

== Play-offs ==
=== Promotional play-offs ===
==== Namibia vs. Nigeria ====
Namibia
2
Complexe Sportif La Concorde, Brazzaville, Republic of Congo
26 June 2021
Hard

Nigeria
1

			1	2	3
1	(Namibia) (Nigeria)	Connor Henry Van Schalkwyk; Uche Oparaoji	0; 6	6; 2	6; 4
2	(Namibia) (Nigeria)	Codie Schalk Van Schalkwyk; Joseph Imeh Ubon	1; 6	2; 6
3	(Namibia) (Nigeria)	Codie Schalk Van Schalkwyk / Connor Henry Van Schalkwyk; Abdul-Mumin Babalola / Joseph Imeh Ubon	6; 4	6; 3

==== Ivory Coast vs. Botswana ====
Ivory Coast
2
Complexe Sportif La Concorde, Brazzaville, Republic of Congo
26 June 2021
Hard

Botswana
0

			1	2	3
1	(Ivory Coast) (Botswana)	Abdoulaziz Bationo; Denzel Seetso	1; 6	6; 3	6; 1
2	(Ivory Coast) (Botswana)	Eliakim Coulibaly; Tsholofelo Tsiang	6; 0	6; 1
3	(Ivory Coast) (Botswana)	Kouadio Guillaume Koffi / Sibi Junior Soumahoro; Thato Holmes / Tshepo Mosarwa				not played

=== 5th to 6th play-off ===
==== Angola vs. Cameroon ====
Angola
0
Complexe Sportif La Concorde, Brazzaville, Republic of Congo
26 June 2021
Hard

Cameroon
3

			1	2	3
1	(Angola) (Cameroon)	Fernando André; Lloyd Sergio Watat Njanga	4; 6	2; 6
2	(Angola) (Cameroon)	Zidario Quitomina; Boriss Kamdem	1; 6	2; 6
3	(Angola) (Cameroon)	Nicolau Monteiro / Cleuson Tipewa; Boriss Kamdem / Lloyd Sergio Watat Njanga	2; 6	3; 6

=== 7th to 8th play-off ===
==== Uganda vs. Senegal ====
Uganda
1
Complexe Sportif La Concorde, Brazzaville, Republic of Congo
26 June 2021
Hard

Senegal
2

			1	2	3
1	(Uganda) (Senegal)	Frank Tayebwa; Hassimiyou Dieng	6; 4	6; 3
2	(Uganda) (Senegal)	Boris Aguma; Nicolas Jadoun	2; 6	4; 6
3	(Uganda) (Senegal)	Boris Aguma / Simon Peter Ayella; Seydina André / Yannick Languina	1; 6	2; 6

=== 9th to 10th play-off ===
==== Congo vs. Gabon ====
Congo
0
Complexe Sportif La Concorde, Brazzaville, Republic of Congo
26 June 2021
Hard

Gabon
3

			1	2	3
1	(Republic of the Congo) (Gabon)	Christ Geovhany Mezenga Lentom; Willy Lebendje	0; 6	0; 0		retired
2	(Republic of the Congo) (Gabon)	Brasny Ntomosso; Lyold Obiang Ondo	0; 6	0; 6
3	(Republic of the Congo) (Gabon)	Duhamel Franklin Biboussy / Brasny Ntomosso; Willy Lebendje / Lyold Obiang Ondo	0; 6	0; 6
