= Kintélé Sports Complex =

Sports venue in the Republic of the Congo

- Kintélé Sports Complex
- Interactive map of Kintélé Sports Complex
- Full name: Kintélé Sports Complex
- Location: Brazzaville, Republic of the Congo

Construction
- Opened: 31 August 2015

Tenant
- 2015 African Games

The Kintélé Sports Complex is an Olympic center located in Kintélé, in the northern suburbs of Brazzaville. Inaugurated by president Denis Sassou Nguesso on 1 September 2015, it hosted the 2015 African Games from 4 September to 19 September 2015.

== Construction ==
The complex covers an area of 80.43 hectares (198.7 acres), including 20 hectares (49 acres) for roads and parking. The cost exceeded 380 billion CFA francs and involved 4,500 workers, including 1,500 Chinese and 2,500 Congolese from four construction companies: China State Construction Engineering, Zhengwei Technique Congo, Sinohydro, and Procob. Construction took 27 months.

== Equipment ==
=== Athletes ===
It has a 60,000-seat Olympic stadium, a 10,000-seat sports arena and a 2,000-seat aquatic complex.

=== Others ===
It includes hotels, a media and administrative center, a cafe and restaurant, an exhibition center, an Olympic village and a heliport.

| Venue | Capacity | Sports |
|---|---|---|
| Kintele Stadium | 60,056 | Athletics, Football, Ceremonies |
| Palais des Sports | 10,134 | Handball, Karate |
| Kintele Aquatic Complex | 2,000 | Swimming |
| Kintele Tennis Courts | 1,000 | Tennis |
| Beach Volleyball Arena | | Beach volleyball |
| Petanque Field | | Petanque |
