= Isaac Nortey =

US-based Ghanaian tennis player

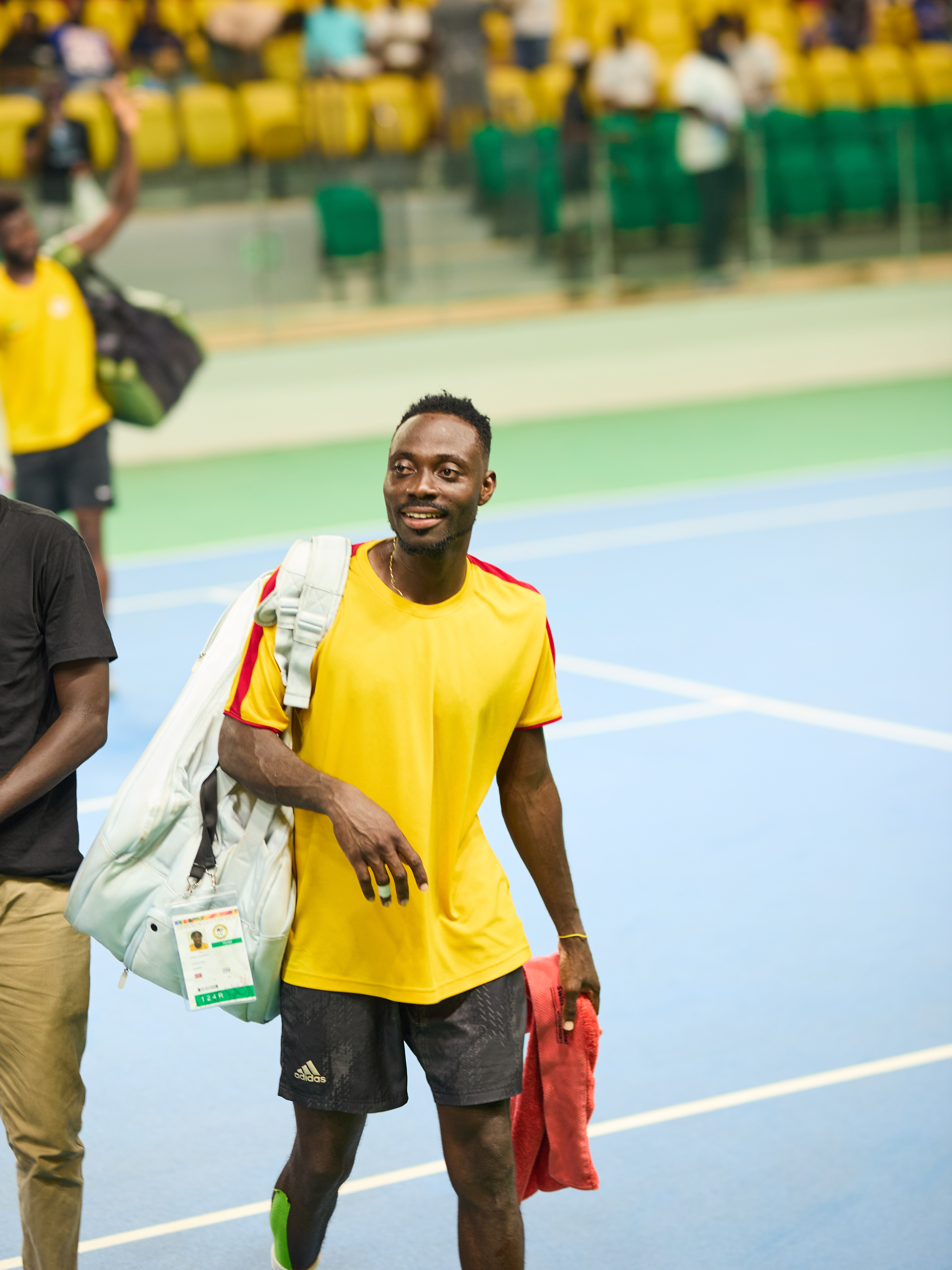
- Country (sports): Ghana
- Residence: United States
- Born: 8 July 1999 (age 27) Accra, Ghana
- Height: 1.83 m (6 ft 0 in)
- Plays: Right-handed, One-Handed Backhand
- Prize money: US $20,619

Singles
- Career record: 0–0 (at ATP Tour level, Grand Slam level, and in Davis Cup)
- Career titles: 0
- Highest ranking: No. 1,336 (2 November 2026)
- Current ranking: No. 1,340 (9 November 2026)

Doubles
- Career record: 0–0 (at ATP Tour level, Grand Slam level, and in Davis Cup)
- Career titles: 0
- Highest ranking: No. 430 (20 October 2025)
- Current ranking: No. 872 (9 November 2026)
- Last updated on: 9 November 2026.

Isaac Nortey (born in 1999) is a US-based Ghanaian tennis player. He was one of the highest-ranked junior tennis player in Africa at the age of 15.

== Early life and education ==
Nortey was born in Accra in Ghana. He is studying Human Development and Family Studies. He is based in the United States.

== Career ==
Nortey began his career as a soccer player before switching to tennis at the age of 7. He started playing at the Lakeland's Galindo Tennis. He won six tournaments. He has played in Intercollegiate Tennis Association tournament hosted in Mexico.

In June 2019 Nortey was part of the Ghanaian tennis team to take part in the Davis Cup Group IV in Brazzaville, Congo.
