= 2020–21 Davis Cup =

2020–2021 edition of the Davis Cup

Details
- Duration: 6 March 2020 – 5 December 2021
- Edition: 109th

Champion
- Winning nation: RTF

The 2020–21 Davis Cup was the 109th edition of the Davis Cup, a tournament between national teams in men's tennis. It was sponsored by Rakuten. For this edition, the format of the cup was changed. The new format saw the creation of a Davis Cup World Group I and World Group II which was played on a worldwide basis and replaced the regional Group I and Group II. As a result, the Davis Cup nations ranking was no longer used to determine which group a nation was played in. Previous the 2019, and the 2021 finals host Spain were the defending champions. Due to the COVID-19 pandemic, on 26 June 2020 the ITF announced that the 2020 finals would take place from 22 until 28 November 2021. In addition, 24 World Group I and World Group II ties were postponed to March and September 2021, and the 2020 regional Group III and Group IV events were also postponed to 2021. The 18 nations that qualified for the finals kept their standing for the next year.

== Davis Cup Finals ==
Date: 25 November–5 December 2021
Venue: Madrid Arena, Madrid, Spain
Olympiahalle, Innsbruck, Austria
Pala Alpitour, Turin, Italy
Surface: Hard court (indoor)

18 nations took part in the finals, formerly known as World Group. The qualification was as follows:

- 4 semifinalists of the previous edition
- 2 wild card teams (announced by ITF on 23 November 2019 as France and Serbia)
- 12 winners of a qualifier round, in March 2020

H = Host nation, TH = Title holder, WC = Wild card

Participating teams
Australia	Austria (H)	Canada	Colombia	Croatia	Czech Republic
Ecuador	France (WC)	Germany	Great Britain	Hungary	Italy (H)
Kazakhstan	RTF	Serbia (WC)	Spain (H, TH)	Sweden	United States

=== Seeds ===
The seedings were based on the Nations ranking of 9 March.

#: Nations ranking as of 9 March 2020.

1. Spain (TH, #3)
2. Canada (#6)
3. France (#1)
4. Croatia (#2)
5. United States (#5)
6. Serbia (#7)

=== Qualifying round ===
Date: 6–7 March 2020

Twenty-six eligible teams were:

- 14 teams ranked 5th-18th in the Finals.
- 12 winning teams from their Group I zone.

Two wild cards for the Finals were selected from these 26 nations. Serbia and France were announced prior to the Qualifiers draw. The remaining 24 nations competed in head-to-head matches, with the 12 winning teams to play at the Finals and the 12 losing teams to play at the World Group I in 2022.

The Davis Cup Qualifiers draw took place on 24 November 2019 at La Caja Mágica.

Seeded teams

- Argentina
- Australia
- Austria
- Belgium
- Croatia
- Czech Republic
- Germany
- Italy
- Japan
- Kazakhstan
- Sweden
- United States

Unseeded teams:

- Belarus
- Brazil
- Chile
- Colombia
- Ecuador
- Hungary
- India
- Slovakia
- South Korea
- Netherlands
- Uruguay
- Uzbekistan

Home team	Score	Away team	Location	Venue	Surface	Ref.
Croatia [1]	3–1	India	Zagreb	Dom Sportova	Hard (i)	
Hungary	3–2	Belgium [2]	Debrecen	Főnix Hall	Clay (i)	
Colombia	3–1	Argentina [3]	Bogotá	Palacio de los Deportes	Clay (i)	
United States [4]	4–0	Uzbekistan	Honolulu	Neal S. Blaisdell Center	Hard (i)	
Australia [5]	3–1	Brazil	Adelaide	Memorial Drive Tennis Centre	Hard	
Italy [6]	4–0	South Korea	Cagliari	Circolo Tennis Cagliari	Clay	
Germany [7]	4–1	Belarus	Düsseldorf	Castello Düsseldorf	Hard (i)	
Kazakhstan [8]	3–1	Netherlands	Nur-Sultan	Daulet National Tennis Centre	Hard (i)	
Slovakia	1–3	Czech Republic [9]	Bratislava	AXA Aréna NTC	Clay (i)	
Austria [10]	3–1	Uruguay	Premstätten	Steiermarkhalle Schwarzlsee	Hard (i)	
Japan [11]	0–3	Ecuador	Miki	Bourbon Beans Dome	Hard (i)	
Sweden [12]	3–1	Chile	Stockholm	Kungliga tennishallen	Hard (i)	

=== Group stage ===
Qualified for the Knockout stage
Eliminated

T = Ties, M = Matches, S = Sets

Group	Winner				Runner-up				Third			
Group	Nation	T	M	S	Nation	T	M	S	Nation	T	M	S
A	RTF	2–0	5–1	11–5	Spain	1–1	4–2	9–7	Ecuador	0–2	0–6	4–12
B	Kazakhstan	2–0	5–1	10–5	Sweden	1–1	4–2	9–4	Canada	0–2	0–6	2–12
C	Great Britain	2–0	4–2	8–5	France	1–1	3–3	6–8	Czech Republic	0–2	2–4	7–8
D	Croatia	2–0	5–1	11–3	Australia	1–1	2–4	6–10	Hungary	0–2	2–4	6–10
E	Italy	2–0	4–2	9–5	Colombia	1–1	3–3	8–8	United States	0–2	2–4	5–9
F	Germany	2–0	4–2	8–5	Serbia	1–1	4–2	9–6	Austria	0–2	1–5	4–10

=== Knockout stage ===
Quarterfinals
2 December, Madrid
12	RTF	2
13	Sweden	0
30 November, Innsbruck
9	Great Britain	1
7	Germany	2
29 November, Turin
8	Italy	1
4	Croatia	2
1 December, Madrid
6	Serbia	2
11	Kazakhstan	1

Semifinals
4 December, Madrid
12	RTF	2
7	Germany	1
3 December, Madrid
4	Croatia	2
6	Serbia	1

Final
5 December, Madrid
12	RTF	2
4	Croatia	0

== World Group I ==
Date: 5–6 March 2021 or 17–19 September 2021

Twenty-four teams participated in the World Group I, in series decided on a home and away basis. The seedings are based on the Nations ranking of 9 March.

These twenty-four teams were:

- 12 losing teams from the qualifying round
- 12 winning teams from World Group I play-offs

The eight highest-ranked winners (as at 20 September 2021) of the World Group I ties will automatically progress to the 2022 qualifiers. The four lowest-ranked winners (Norway, Peru, Romania and Ukraine) took part in an additional knock-out tie in November 2021, with the two winners progressing to the 2022 qualifiers and two losers contesting the 2022 World Group I play-offs. The losing nations from the World Group I ties will compete in the World Group I Play-Offs in 2022.

#: Nations ranking as of 9 March 2020.

Seeded teams

- Belgium (#4)
- Argentina (#16)
- Japan (#19)
- Netherlands (#20)
- Chile (#21)
- India (#22)
- Uzbekistan (#25)
- Brazil (#26)
- South Korea (#27)
- Portugal (#28)
- Bosnia and Herzegovina (#29)
- Israel (#30)

Unseeded teams

- Slovakia (#31)
- Uruguay (#32)
- Finland (#33)
- Pakistan (#34)
- Ukraine (#35)
- Lebanon (#36)
- New Zealand (#37)
- Peru (#38)
- Bolivia (#40)
- Romania (#41)
- Belarus (#42)
- Norway (#45)

Home team	Score	Away team	Location	Venue	Surface	Ref.
Bolivia	2–3	Belgium [1]	Asunción (Paraguay)	Rakiura Resort	Clay	
Argentina [2]	4–1	Belarus	Buenos Aires	Buenos Aires Lawn Tennis Club	Clay	
Pakistan	0–4	Japan [3]	Islamabad	Pakistan Sports Complex	Grass	
Uruguay	0–4	Netherlands [4]	Montevideo	Carrasco Lawn Tenis Club	Clay	
Slovakia	3–1	Chile [5]	Bratislava	NTC Arena	Hard (i)	
Finland	3–1	India [6]	Espoo	Espoo Metro Areena	Hard (i)	
Norway	3–1	Uzbekistan [7]	Oslo	Oslo Tennis Arena	Hard (i)	
Lebanon	0–4	Brazil [8]	Jounieh	Automobile and Touring Club of Lebanon	Clay	
New Zealand	1–3	South Korea [9]	Newport (United States)	International Tennis Hall of Fame	Grass	
Romania	3–1	Portugal [10]	Cluj-Napoca	Horia Demian Sports Hall	Hard (i)	
Peru	3–2	Bosnia and Herzegovina [11]	Lima	Club Lawn Tennis de la Exposición	Clay	
Ukraine	3–2	Israel [12]	Kyiv	Marina Tennis Club	Hard (i)	

=== Qualifying round ===
Date: 6–9 March 2020

Twenty-four teams played for the twelve spots in the World Group I, in series decided on a home and away basis.

These twenty-four teams were:

- 12 losing teams from their Group I zone.
- 12 winning teams from their Group II zone.

The 12 winning teams from the play-offs played at the World Group I and the 12 losing teams played at the World Group II.

Seeded teams

- Barbados
- Bosnia and Herzegovina
- China
- Dominican Republic
- Finland
- Israel
- Lebanon
- Pakistan
- Portugal
- Switzerland
- Ukraine
- Venezuela

Unseeded teams

- Bolivia
- Chinese Taipei
- Lithuania
- Mexico
- New Zealand
- Norway
- Peru
- Romania
- Slovenia
- South Africa
- Thailand
- Turkey

Home team	Score	Away team	Location	Venue	Surface	Ref.
Ukraine	3–2	Chinese Taipei	Zaporizhia	Palace of Sports	Hard (i)	
Pakistan	3–0	Slovenia	Islamabad	Pakistan Sports Complex	Grass	
Bolivia	3–1	Dominican Republic	Santa Cruz de la Sierra	Club de Tenis Santa Cruz	Clay	
Turkey	1–3	Israel	Antalya	Club Megasaray Tennis Centre	Clay	
Bosnia and Herzegovina	3–1	South Africa	Zenica	Arena Zenica	Hard (i)	
Mexico	2–3	Finland	Metepec	Club Deportivo La Asunción	Clay	
Lebanon	3–1	Thailand	Jounieh	Automobile and Touring Club of Lebanon	Clay	
New Zealand	3–1	Venezuela	Auckland	ASB Tennis Centre	Hard	
Peru	3–1	Switzerland	Lima	Club Lawn Tennis de la Exposición	Clay	
Norway	4–0	Barbados	Oslo	Oslo Tennis Arena	Hard (i)	
Lithuania	0–4	Portugal	Šiauliai	Šiauliai Tennis Academy	Hard (i)	
Romania	w/o	China	Piatra Neamț	Polyvalent Hall	Hard (i)	

=== Knock-out round ===
Date: 26–28 November 2021

Four teams played in this round, in series decided on a home and away basis.

These four teams were the four lowest-ranked winners of World Group I.

The two winning teams will play at the Qualifiers and the two losing teams will play at the World Group I Play-Offs in 2022.

#: Nations ranking as of 20 September 2021.

Seeded teams

- Ukraine (#33)
- Peru (#35)

Unseeded teams

- Romania (#40)
- Norway (#43)

Home team	Score	Away team	Location	Venue	Surface	Ref.
Norway	3–1	Ukraine [1]	Oslo	Oslo Tennis Arena	Hard (i)	
Romania	4–0	Peru [2]	Cluj-Napoca	Horia Demian Sports Hall	Hard (i)	

== World Group II ==
Date: 5–6 March 2021 or 17–19 September 2021

Twenty-four teams participated in the World Group II, in series decided on a home and away basis. The seedings are based on the Nations ranking of 9 March.

These twenty-four teams were:

- 12 losing teams from World Group I play-offs
- 12 winning teams from World Group II play-offs

The eight highest-ranked winners (as at 20 September 2021) of the World Group II ties will automatically progress to the 2022 World Group I play-offs. The four lowest-ranked teams (Denmark, Morocco, Tunisia and Zimbabwe) took part in an additional knock-out tie in November, with the two winners progressing to the 2022 World Group I play-offs and two losers contesting the 2022 World Group II play-offs. The losing nations from the World Group II ties will compete in the World Group II Play-Offs in 2022.

#: Nations ranking as of 9 March 2020.

Seeded teams

- China (#39)
- Mexico (#43)
- Switzerland (#44)
- Dominican Republic (#46)
- Lithuania (#47)
- Thailand (#48)
- Poland (#49)
- Slovenia (#50)
- Turkey (#51)
- South Africa (#52)
- Chinese Taipei (#53)
- Barbados (#54)

Unseeded teams

- Venezuela (#55)
- Tunisia (#56)
- Estonia (#57)
- Greece (#58)
- Bulgaria (#59)
- Denmark (#60)
- Morocco (#61)
- Zimbabwe (#62)
- Indonesia (#63)
- El Salvador (#64)
- Paraguay (#65)
- Latvia (#66)

Home team	Score	Away team	Location	Venue	Surface	Ref.
Zimbabwe	w/o	China [1]	Harare	Harare Sports Club	Hard	
Bulgaria	1–3	Mexico [2]	Sofia	Sport Hall Sofia	Hard (i)	
Switzerland [3]	5–0	Estonia	Biel	Swiss Tennis Arena	Hard (i)	
Tunisia	3–2	Dominican Republic [4]	Tunis	Cité Nationale Sportive El Menzah	Hard	
Greece	1–3	Lithuania [5]	Heraklion	Lyttos Beach Tennis Academy	Hard	
Denmark	4–1	Thailand [6]	Kolding	Sydbank Arena	Hard (i)	
Poland [7]	3–1	El Salvador	Kalisz	Arena Kalisz	Hard (i)	
Slovenia [8]	3–1	Paraguay	Portorož	Tennis Centre Portoroz	Clay	
Turkey [9]	4–0	Latvia	Istanbul	Enka Spor Kulubu	Hard	
South Africa [10]	4–0	Venezuela	New York (United States)	Forest Hills Stadium	Hard	
Chinese Taipei [11]	w/o	Morocco	—N/a	—N/a	—N/a	
Barbados [12]	3–1	Indonesia	Saint Michael	National Tennis Centre	Hard	

=== Qualifying round ===
Date: 6–7 March 2020

Twenty-four teams played for the twelve spots in the World Group II, in series decided on a home and away basis.

These twenty-four teams are:

- 12 losing teams from their Group II zone:
- 12 teams from their Group III zone:
  - 4 from Europe
  - 3 from Asia/Oceania,
  - 3 from Americas, and
  - 2 from Africa.

The 12 winning teams from the play-offs will play at the World Group II and the 12 losing teams will play at the Group III of the corresponding continental zone.

Seeded teams

- Bulgaria
- Denmark
- Egypt
- El Salvador
- Georgia
- Guatemala
- Hong Kong
- Indonesia
- Morocco
- Paraguay
- Philippines
- Zimbabwe

Unseeded teams

- Costa Rica
- Estonia
- Greece
- Jamaica
- Kenya
- Latvia
- Poland
- Puerto Rico
- Sri Lanka
- (Ba'athist Syria) Syria
- Tunisia
- Vietnam

Home team	Score	Away team	Location	Venue	Surface	Ref.
Latvia	4–1	Egypt	Jūrmala	National Tennis Centre Lielupe	Hard (i)	
Paraguay	4–0	Sri Lanka	Asunción	Club Internacional de Tenis	Clay	
Morocco	4–0	Vietnam	Marrakesh	Royal Tennis Club de Marrakech	Clay	
Indonesia	4–0	Kenya	Jakarta	Gelora Bung Karno Sports Complex	Hard	
Guatemala	1–3	Tunisia	Guatemala City	Federación Nacional De Tenis	Hard	
Costa Rica	1–4	Bulgaria	San José	Costa Rica Country Club	Hard	
Poland	4–0	Hong Kong	Kalisz	Arena Kalisz	Hard (i)	
Zimbabwe	3–1	(Ba'athist Syria) Syria	Harare	Harare Sports Club	Hard	
Philippines	1–4	Greece	Metro Manila	Philippine Columbian Association	Clay (i)	
Denmark	5–0	Puerto Rico	Holbæk	Holbæk Sportsby	Hard (i)	
El Salvador	3–1	Jamaica	San Salvador	Polideportivo de Ciudad Merliot	Hard	
Georgia	1–4	Estonia	Tbilisi	Alex Metreveli Tennis Club	Hard	

=== Knock-out round ===
Date: 26–28 November 2021

Four teams played in this round, in series decided on a home and away basis.

These four teams were the four lowest-ranked winners of World Group II.

The two winning teams will play at the World Group I play-offs and the two losing teams will play at the World Group II Play-Offs in 2022.

#: Nations ranking as of 20 September 2021.

Seeded teams

- Tunisia (#55)
- Denmark (#56)

Unseeded teams

- Morocco (#60)
- Zimbabwe (#62)

Home team	Score	Away team	Location	Venue	Surface	Ref.
Tunisia [1]	4–0	Zimbabwe	Tunis	Tennis Club de Tunis	Clay	
Morocco	1–3	Denmark [2]	Marrakesh	Royal Tennis Club de Marrakech	Clay	

== Americas Zone ==
=== Group III ===
Dates: 30 June–3 July 2021

Location: Centro de Alto Rendimineto Fred Maduro, Panama City, Panama (clay)

The first two nations qualify for the 2022 Davis Cup World Group II play-offs

Teams

- Bahamas
- Bermuda
- Costa Rica
- Cuba
- Guatemala
- Honduras

- Jamaica
- Panama (host)
- Puerto Rico
- Trinidad and Tobago
- U.S. Virgin Islands

Inactive Teams

- Antigua and Barbuda
- Aruba
- Eastern Caribbean
- Haiti
- Saint Lucia

Promotions

- Jamaica and Guatemala qualify for the 2022 Davis Cup World Group II play-offs

== Asia/Oceania Zone ==
=== Group III ===
Dates: 15–18 September 2021

Location: Jordan Tennis Federation, Amman, Jordan (hard)

The first three nations qualify for the 2022 Davis Cup World Group II play-offs

Teams

- Hong Kong
- Jordan (host)
- Kuwait
- Malaysia
- Pacific Oceania

- Qatar
- Sri Lanka
- Syria
- Vietnam

Withdrawn

- Philippines

Promotions/Relegations

- Hong Kong, Vietnam and Pacific Oceania qualify for the 2022 Davis Cup World Group II play-offs
- Kuwait, Qatar and Sri Lanka are relegated to 2022 Davis Cup Asia/Oceania Zone Group IV

=== Group IV ===
Dates: 18–23 October 2021

Location: Bahrain Tennis Federation Courts, Isa Town, Bahrain (hard)

The first three nations qualify for the 2022 Davis Cup Asia/Oceania Zone Group III

Teams

- Bahrain (host)
- Cambodia
- Guam
- Iran
- Iraq
- Kyrgyzstan

- Mongolia
- Oman
- Saudi Arabia
- Turkmenistan
- United Arab Emirates
- Yemen

Inactive Teams

- Bangladesh
- Brunei
- Myanmar
- Singapore
- Tajikistan

Promotions

- Iran, Saudi Arabia and United Arab Emirates are promoted to 2022 Davis Cup Asia/Oceania Zone Group III

== Europe Zone ==
=== Group III ===
Dates: 16–19 June 2021

Location: Herodotou Tennis Academy, Larnaca, Cyprus (hard)

The first three nations qualify for the 2022 Davis Cup World Group II play-offs

The last two nations (excluding Liechtenstein) are relegated to 2022 Davis Cup Europe Zone Group IV

Teams

- Cyprus (host)
- Georgia
- Iceland
- Ireland

- Luxembourg
- Malta
- Monaco

Withdrawn

- Liechtenstein

Promotions/Relegations

- Cyprus, Ireland and Monaco qualify for the 2022 Davis Cup World Group II play-offs
- Iceland and Malta are relegated to 2022 Davis Cup Europe Zone Group IV

=== Group IV ===
Dates: 22–26 June 2021

Location: Tennis Club Jug, Skopje, North Macedonia (clay)

The first four nations qualify for the 2022 Davis Cup Europe Zone Group III

Teams

- Albania
- Andorra
- Armenia
- Azerbaijan
- Kosovo

- Moldova
- Montenegro
- North Macedonia (host)
- San Marino

Promotions

- Armenia, Moldova, Montenegro and North Macedonia are promoted to the 2022 Davis Cup Europe Zone Group III.

== Africa Zone ==
=== Group III ===
Dates: 11–14 August 2021

Location: Smash Academy, Cairo, Egypt (clay)

The first two nations qualify for the 2022 Davis Cup World Group II play-offs

Teams

- Algeria
- Benin
- Egypt (host)
- Ghana

- Kenya
- Mozambique
- Rwanda

Withdrawn

- Madagascar

Promotions/Relegations

- Egypt and Benin qualify for the 2022 Davis Cup World Group II play-offs.
- Rwanda and Ghana were relegated to 2022 Davis Cup Africa Zone Group IV.

=== Group IV ===
Dates: 21–26 June 2021

Location: Complexe Sportif La Concorde, Brazzaville, Congo (hard)

The first two nations qualify for the 2022 Davis Cup Africa Zone Group III

Teams

- Angola
- Botswana
- Cameroon
- Congo (host)
- Gabon

- Ivory Coast
- Namibia
- Nigeria
- Senegal
- Uganda

Inactive Teams

- Burkina Faso
- Djibouti
- Ethiopia
- Lesotho
- Libya
- Mali
- Mauritius
- Sudan
- Togo
- Zambia

Promotions

- Ivory Coast and Namibia are promoted to the 2022 Davis Cup Africa Zone Group III.
