= 2020 Davis Cup World Group II knock-out stage =

The 2021 Davis Cup World Group II knock-out stage will be held on 26–28 November 2021. The two winners of this round will qualify for the 2022 Davis Cup World Group I Play-offs while the two losers will qualify for the 2022 Davis Cup World Group II Play-offs.

== Teams ==
Four teams will play for two spots in the World Group I play-offs, in series decided on a home and away basis. These four teams are the four lowest-ranked winning teams from World Group II.

The two winning teams from the knock-outs will play at the World Group I play-offs and the 2 losing teams will play at the World Group II play-offs.

#: Nations ranking as of 20 September 2021.

Seeded teams

- Tunisia (#55)
- Denmark (#56)

Unseeded teams

- Morocco (#60)
- Zimbabwe (#62)

The draw was held on 22 September 2021.

== Results summary ==
Home team	Score	Away team	Location	Venue	Surface
Tunisia [1]	4–0	Zimbabwe	Tunis	Tennis Club de Tunis	Clay
Morocco	1–3	Denmark [2]	Marrakesh	Royal Tennis Club de Marrakech	Clay

== Knock-out results ==
=== Tunisia vs. Zimbabwe ===
Tunisia
4
Tennis Club de Tunis, Tunis, Tunisia
26–27 November 2021
Clay

Zimbabwe
0

			1	2	3
1	(Tunisia) (Zimbabwe)	Malek Jaziri; Mehluli Don Ayanda Sibanda	6; 0	6; 1
2	(Tunisia) (Zimbabwe)	Aziz Dougaz; Benjamin Lock	2; 6	7^{8} 6^{6}	7; 5
3	(Tunisia) (Zimbabwe)	Malek Jaziri / Skander Mansouri; Benjamin Lock / Courtney John Lock	6; 3	6; 2
4	(Tunisia) (Zimbabwe)	Aziz Ouakaa; Thaco Ncube	6; 4	6; 0
5	(Tunisia) (Zimbabwe)	Aziz Dougaz; Mehluli Don Ayanda Sibanda				not played

=== Morocco vs. Denmark ===
Morocco
1
Royal Tennis Club de Marrakech, Marrakesh, Morocco
27–28 November 2021
Clay

Denmark
3

			1	2	3
1	(Morocco) (Denmark)	Elliot Benchetrit; Christian Sigsgaard	7^{7} 6^{4}	3; 6	6; 2
2	(Morocco) (Denmark)	Lamine Ouahab; August Holmgren	6; 4	2; 6	4; 6
3	(Morocco) (Denmark)	Elliot Benchetrit / Lamine Ouahab; Frederik Nielsen / Christian Sigsgaard	4; 6	4; 6
4	(Morocco) (Denmark)	Elliot Benchetrit; August Holmgren	2; 6	0; 6
5	(Morocco) (Denmark)	Lamine Ouahab; Christian Sigsgaard				not played
