= 2020 Davis Cup World Group I play-offs =

Tennis tournament

The 2020 Davis Cup World Group I play-offs were held on 6–9 March. The twelve winners of this round qualified for the 2020 Davis Cup World Group I while the twelve losers qualified for the 2020 Davis Cup World Group II.

== Teams ==
Twenty-four teams played for twelve spots in the World Group I, in series decided on a home and away basis.

These twenty-four teams are:

- 12 losing teams from their Group I zone.
- 12 winning teams from their Group II zone.

The 12 winning teams from the play-offs would play at the World Group I and the 12 losing teams would play at the World Group II.

Seeded teams

- Barbados
- Bosnia and Herzegovina
- China
- Dominican Republic
- Finland
- Israel
- Lebanon
- Pakistan
- Portugal
- Switzerland
- Ukraine
- Venezuela

Unseeded teams

- Bolivia
- Chinese Taipei
- Lithuania
- Mexico
- New Zealand
- Norway
- Peru
- Romania
- Slovenia
- South Africa
- Thailand
- Turkey

== Results summary ==
Home team	Score	Away team	Location	Venue	Surface
Ukraine	3–2	Chinese Taipei	Zaporizhia	Palace of Sports	Hard (i)
Pakistan	3–0	Slovenia	Islamabad	Pakistan Sports Complex	Grass
Bolivia	3–1	Dominican Republic	Santa Cruz de la Sierra	Club de Tenis Santa Cruz	Clay
Turkey	1–3	Israel	Antalya	Club Megasaray Tennis Centre	Clay
Bosnia and Herzegovina	3–1	South Africa	Zenica	Arena Zenica	Hard (i)
Mexico	2–3	Finland	Metepec	Club Deportivo La Asunción	Clay
Lebanon	3–1	Thailand	Jounieh	Automobile and Touring Club of Lebanon	Clay
New Zealand	3–1	Venezuela	Auckland	ASB Tennis Centre	Hard
Peru	3–1	Switzerland	Lima	Club Lawn Tennis de la Exposición	Clay
Norway	4–0	Barbados	Oslo	Oslo Tennis Arena	Hard (i)
Lithuania	0–4	Portugal	Šiauliai	Šiauliai Tennis Academy	Hard (i)
Romania	w/o	China	Piatra Neamț	Polyvalent Hall	Hard (i)

China withdrew from its match against Romania because of the COVID-19 pandemic.

== World Group I play-offs results ==
=== Ukraine vs. Chinese Taipei ===
Ukraine
3
Palace of Sports, Zaporizhia, Ukraine
6–7 March 2020
Hard (i)

Chinese Taipei
2

			1	2	3
1	(Ukraine) (Chinese Taipei)	Sergiy Stakhovsky; Tseng Chun-hsin	6; 3	1; 6	2; 6
2	(Ukraine) (Chinese Taipei)	Illya Marchenko; Wu Tung-lin	4; 6	4; 6
3	(Ukraine) (Chinese Taipei)	Denys Molchanov / Sergiy Stakhovsky; Hsieh Cheng-peng / Yang Tsung-hua	6^{4} 7^{7}	6; 4	6; 4
4	(Ukraine) (Chinese Taipei)	Sergiy Stakhovsky; Wu Tung-lin	7^{7} 6^{3}	4; 6	6; 3
5	(Ukraine) (Chinese Taipei)	Illya Marchenko; Tseng Chun-hsin	6; 3	6; 2

=== Pakistan vs. Slovenia ===
Pakistan
3
Pakistan Sports Complex, Islamabad, Pakistan
8–9 March 2020
Grass

Slovenia
0

			1	2	3
1	(Pakistan) (Slovenia)	Aisam-ul-Haq Qureshi; Nik Razboršek	4; 6	7; 5	7^{7} 6^{1}
2	(Pakistan) (Slovenia)	Aqeel Khan; Blaž Kavčič	0; 6	7^{8} 6^{6}	6; 4
3	(Pakistan) (Slovenia)	Aqeel Khan / Aisam-ul-Haq Qureshi; Blaž Kavčič / Tom Kočevar-Dešman	6; 3	7^{9} 6^{7}
4	(Pakistan) (Slovenia)	Aisam-ul-Haq Qureshi; Blaž Kavčič				not played
5	(Pakistan) (Slovenia)	Aqeel Khan; Nik Razboršek				not played

=== Bolivia vs. Dominican Republic ===
Bolivia
3
Club de Tenis Santa Cruz, Santa Cruz de la Sierra, Bolivia
6–7 March 2020
Clay

Dominican Republic
1

			1	2	3
1	(Bolivia) (Dominican Republic)	Hugo Dellien; José Hernández-Fernández	6; 3	6; 4
2	(Bolivia) (Dominican Republic)	Federico Zeballos; Roberto Cid Subervi	3; 6	4; 6
3	(Bolivia) (Dominican Republic)	Hugo Dellien / Federico Zeballos; Roberto Cid Subervi / Nick Hardt	6; 3	6; 2
4	(Bolivia) (Dominican Republic)	Hugo Dellien; Roberto Cid Subervi	7; 5	6; 4
5	(Bolivia) (Dominican Republic)	Federico Zeballos; José Hernández-Fernández				not played

=== Turkey vs. Israel ===
Turkey
1
Club Megasaray Tennis Centre, Antalya, Turkey
6–7 March 2020
Clay

Israel
3

			1	2	3
1	(Turkey) (Israel)	Cem İlkel; Daniel Cukierman	6^{4} 7^{7}	2; 6
2	(Turkey) (Israel)	Altuğ Çelikbilek; Ben Patael	7; 5	1; 6	6; 4
3	(Turkey) (Israel)	Yankı Erel / Cem İlkel; Daniel Cukierman / Jonathan Erlich	3; 6	1; 6
4	(Turkey) (Israel)	Cem İlkel; Edan Leshem	2; 6	6^{4} 7^{7}
5	(Turkey) (Israel)	Altuğ Çelikbilek; Daniel Cukierman				not played

=== Bosnia and Herzegovina vs. South Africa ===
Bosnia and Herzegovina
3
Arena Zenica, Zenica, Bosnia and Herzegovina
6–7 March 2020
Hard (i)

South Africa
1

			1	2	3
1	(Bosnia and Herzegovina) (South Africa)	Damir Džumhur; Ruan Roelofse	7^{7} 6^{3}	7; 5
2	(Bosnia and Herzegovina) (South Africa)	Mirza Bašić; Lloyd Harris	5; 7	2; 6
3	(Bosnia and Herzegovina) (South Africa)	Mirza Bašić / Tomislav Brkić; Raven Klaasen / Ruan Roelofse	7^{7} 6^{4}	6; 3
4	(Bosnia and Herzegovina) (South Africa)	Damir Džumhur; Lloyd Harris	6; 1	2; 1		retired
5	(Bosnia and Herzegovina) (South Africa)	Mirza Bašić; Ruan Roelofse				not played

=== Mexico vs. Finland ===
Mexico
2
Club Deportivo La Asunción, Metepec, Mexico
6–7 March 2020
Clay

Finland
3

			1	2	3
1	(Mexico) (Finland)	Manuel Sánchez; Patrik Niklas-Salminen	4; 6	4; 6
2	(Mexico) (Finland)	Gerardo López Villaseñor; Otto Virtanen	6; 3	6^{5} 7^{7}	7; 5
3	(Mexico) (Finland)	Santiago González / Miguel Ángel Reyes-Varela; Harri Heliövaara / Henri Kontinen	3; 6	6^{6} 7^{8}
4	(Mexico) (Finland)	Gerardo López Villaseñor; Harri Heliövaara	6; 0	7^{7} 6^{2}
5	(Mexico) (Finland)	Manuel Sánchez; Otto Virtanen	2; 6	6^{6} 7^{8}

=== Lebanon vs. Thailand ===
Lebanon
3
Automobile and Touring Club of Lebanon, Jounieh, Lebanon
6–7 March 2020
Clay

Thailand
1

			1	2	3
1	(Lebanon) (Thailand)	Benjamin Hassan; Jirat Navasirisomboon	6; 1	6; 2
2	(Lebanon) (Thailand)	Hasan Ibrahim; Wishaya Trongcharoenchaikul	6^{8} 7^{10}	6; 3	6^{5} 7^{7}
3	(Lebanon) (Thailand)	Benjamin Hassan / Giovani Samaha; Kittirat Kerdlaphee / Phongsapak Kerdlaphee	6; 3	6^{7} 7^{9}	6; 0
4	(Lebanon) (Thailand)	Benjamin Hassan; Wishaya Trongcharoenchaikul	6; 2	6; 0
5	(Lebanon) (Thailand)	Hasan Ibrahim; Jirat Navasirisomboon				not played

=== New Zealand vs. Venezuela ===
New Zealand
3
ASB Tennis Centre, Auckland, New Zealand
6–7 March 2020
Hard

Venezuela
1

			1	2	3
1	(New Zealand) (Venezuela)	Finn Tearney; Jordi Muñoz Abreu	6; 4	6; 4
2	(New Zealand) (Venezuela)	Ajeet Rai; Luis David Martínez	7; 5	4; 6	2; 6
3	(New Zealand) (Venezuela)	Marcus Daniell / Artem Sitak; Luis David Martínez / Jordi Muñoz Abreu	6; 3	7^{7} 6^{3}
4	(New Zealand) (Venezuela)	Rubin Statham; Brandon Pérez	6; 2	6^{3} 7^{7}	4; 1	retired
5	(New Zealand) (Venezuela)	Finn Tearney; Luis David Martínez				not played

=== Peru vs. Switzerland ===
Peru
3
Club Lawn Tennis de la Exposición, Lima, Peru
6–7 March 2020
Clay

Switzerland
1

			1	2	3
1	(Peru) (Switzerland)	Juan Pablo Varillas; Sandro Ehrat	7^{7} 6^{4}	7^{7} 6^{3}
2	(Peru) (Switzerland)	Nicolás Álvarez; Henri Laaksonen	4; 6	4; 6
3	(Peru) (Switzerland)	Sergio Galdós / Jorge Panta; Sandro Ehrat / Luca Margaroli	7; 5	7^{10} 6^{8}
4	(Peru) (Switzerland)	Juan Pablo Varillas; Henri Laaksonen	6; 3	3; 6	7^{7} 6^{3}
5	(Peru) (Switzerland)	Nicolás Álvarez; Sandro Ehrat				not played

=== Norway vs. Barbados ===
Norway
4
Oslo Tennis Arena, Oslo, Norway
6–7 March 2020
Hard (i)

Barbados
0

			1	2	3
1	(Norway) (Barbados)	Viktor Durasovic; Darian King	6; 4	6; 2
2	(Norway) (Barbados)	Casper Ruud; Haydn Lewis	6; 2	6; 2
3	(Norway) (Barbados)	Viktor Durasovic / Casper Ruud; Haydn Lewis / Kaipo Marshall	6; 3	6; 2
4	(Norway) (Barbados)	Lukas Hellum Lilleengen; Kaipo Marshall	6; 2	6; 1
5	(Norway) (Barbados)	Viktor Durasovic; Haydn Lewis				not played

=== Lithuania vs. Portugal ===
Lithuania
0
Šiauliai Tennis Academy, Šiauliai, Lithuania
6–7 March 2020
Hard (i)

Portugal
4

			1	2	3
1	(Lithuania) (Portugal)	Laurynas Grigelis; Frederico Ferreira Silva	7^{10} 6^{8}	3; 6	0; 6
2	(Lithuania) (Portugal)	Julius Tverijonas; João Sousa	1; 6	3; 6
3	(Lithuania) (Portugal)	Laurynas Grigelis / Lukas Mugevičius; João Sousa / Pedro Sousa	3; 6	1; 6
4	(Lithuania) (Portugal)	Laurynas Grigelis; Pedro Sousa	6^{5} 7^{7}	7; 5	[3] [10]
5	(Lithuania) (Portugal)	Julius Tverijonas; Frederico Ferreira Silva				not played

=== Romania vs. China ===
Romania
w/o
Polyvalent Hall, Piatra Neamț, Romania (Note: China withdrew from the tie following the increased restrictions in response to the COVID-19 pandemic which have resulted in team China being unable to travel to this tie.)
6–7 March 2020
Hard (i)

China

			1	2	3
1	(Romania) (China)	N/A; N/A				not played
2	(Romania) (China)	N/A; N/A				not played
3	(Romania) (China)	N/A; N/A				not played
4	(Romania) (China)	N/A; N/A				not played
5	(Romania) (China)	N/A; N/A				not played
