= Sanjar Fayziev =

Uzbekistani tennis player (born 1994)

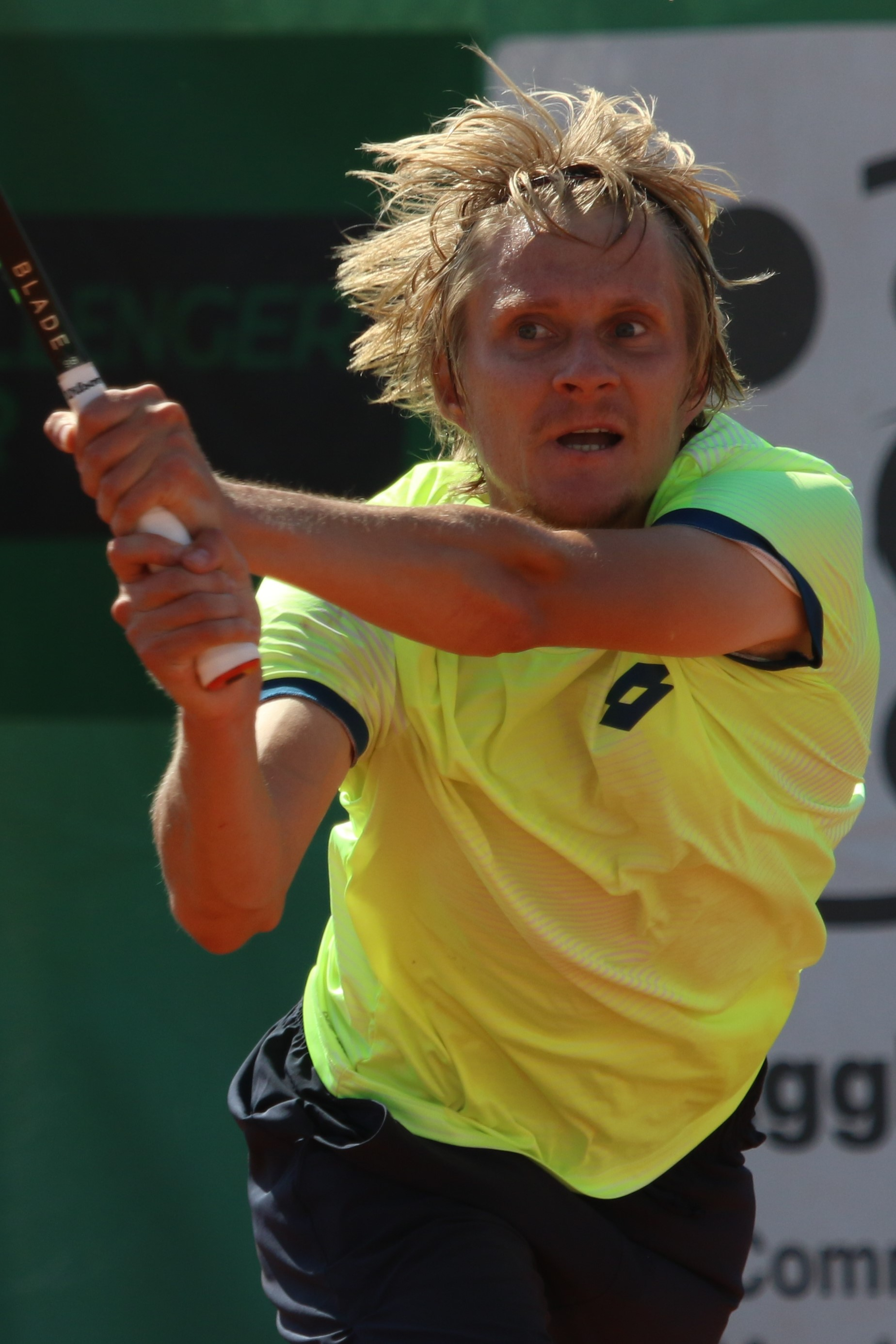
- Fayziev at the 2022 Internationaux de Tennis de Blois
- Country (sports): Uzbekistan
- Residence: Tashkent, Uzbekistan
- Born: 29 July 1994 (age 32) Tashkent, Uzbekistan
- Height: 1.88 m (6 ft 2 in)
- Plays: Right-handed (two handed-backhand)
- Prize money: $158,410

Singles
- Career record: 2–13 (at ATP Tour level, Grand Slam level, and in Davis Cup)
- Career titles: 0
- Highest ranking: No. 253 (17 July 2017)

Doubles
- Career record: 6–4 (at ATP Tour level, Grand Slam level, and in Davis Cup)
- Career titles: 0
- Highest ranking: No. 154 (10 October 2022)

Team competitions
- Davis Cup: 8–17
- Last updated on: 28 January 2024.

Sanjar Fayziev (born 29 July 1994) is an Uzbekistani tennis player.

Fayziev has a career high ATP singles ranking of 253 achieved on 17 July 2017. He also has a career high ATP doubles ranking of 190 achieved on 20 June 2022. Fayziev has won 2 ATP Challenger doubles titles and 7 ITF singles and 16 ITF doubles title.

Fayziev has represented Uzbekistan at the Davis Cup where he has a W/L record of 7–16.

In 2023, Fayziev was banned from professional tennis for 42 months (6 months suspended) and fined $15,000 by the International Tennis Integrity Agency after he was found liable for five match fixing charges involving two matches that took place in 2018.

== ATP Challenger and ITF Futures finals ==
=== Singles: 17 (7–10) ===
Legend ATP Challenger (0–0) ITF Futures (7–9)	Finals by surface Hard (5–7) Clay (2–3) Grass (0–0) Carpet (0–0)

Result	W–L	Date	Tournament	Tier	Surface	Opponent	Score
Loss	0–1	Jan 2015	Kazakhstan F1, Astana	Futures	Hard	(Russia) Mikhail Elgin	4–6, 4–6
Win	1–1	Oct 2016	Kazakhstan F6, Shymkent	Futures	Clay	(Estonia) Vladimir Ivanov	4–6, 6–3, 6–2
Loss	1–2	Oct 2016	Kazakhstan F7, Shymkent	Futures	Clay	(Russia) Ivan Gakhov	2–6, 7–5, 2–6
Loss	1–3	Nov 2016	Kuwait F1, Meshref	Futures	Hard	(Austria) Maximilian Neuchrist	3–6, 4–6
Win	2–3	Nov 2016	Kuwait F2,Meshref	Futures	Hard	(Russia) Evgeny Karlovskiy	6–2, 7–6^{(8–6)}
Win	3–3	Apr 2017	Uzbekistan F2, Qarshi	Futures	Hard	(Belarus) Egor Gerasimov	7–6^{(7–4)}, 5–7, 7–6^{(7–5)}
Win	4–3	Jun 2017	Uzbekistan F3, Andijan	Futures	Hard	(India) Sriram Balaji	6–3, 6–3
Loss	4–4	Feb 2018	Kazakhstan F2, Shymkent	Futures	Hard	(Serbia) Nikola Milojević	2–6, 7–5, 6–7^{(6–8)}
Win	5–4	Jun 2018	Uzbekistan F3, Andijan	Futures	Hard	(Turkey) Cem İlkel	7–6^{(9–7)}, 6–4
Loss	5–5	Sep 2018	Thailand F2, Nonthaburi	Futures	Hard	(Czech Republic) Patrik Rikl	2–6, 4–6
Win	6–5	Sep 2018	Kazakhstan F8, Shymkent	Futures	Clay	(Russia) Alexander Igoshin	6–2, 6–3
Loss	6–6	Nov 2018	Thailand F8, Nonthaburi	Futures	Hard	(Russia) Roman Safiullin	5–7, 6–4, 4–6
Win	7–6	Jan 2019	M25 Kazan, Russia	World Tennis Tour	Hard	(Russia) Teymuraz Gabashvili	6–3, 7–5
Loss	7–7	Mar 2019	M25+H Kazan, Russia	World Tennis Tour	Hard	(Russia) Roman Safiullin	3–6, 6–1, 4–6
Loss	7–8	Aug 2019	M25 Nonthaburi, Thailand	World Tennis Tour	Hard	(Japan) Renta Tokuda	3–6, 3–6
Loss	7–9	Aug 2019	M15 Moscow, Russia	World Tennis Tour	Clay	(Russia) Alexander Zhurbin	3–6, 1–6
Loss	7–10	Apr 2021	M15 Antalya, Turkey	World Tennis Tour	Clay	(South Korea) Seong Chan Hong	1–6, 3–6

=== Doubles: 34 (17–17) ===
Legend ATP Challenger (2–4) ITF Futures (16–13)	Finals by surface Hard (9–13) Clay (8–3) Grass (0–0) Carpet (0–1)

Result	W–L	Date	Tournament	Tier	Surface	Partner	Opponents	Score
Loss	0–1	Jun 2015	Uzbekistan F4, Namangan	Futures	Hard	(Uzbekistan) Jurabek Karimov	(South Africa) Dean O'Brien (South Africa) Ruan Roelofse	5–7, 4–6
Loss	0–2	Jan 2016	Kazakhstan F2, Aktobe	Futures	Hard	(Kazakhstan) Timur Khabibulin	(Belarus) Yaraslav Shyla (Belarus) Andrei Vasilevski	6–4, 4–6, [10–12]
Loss	0–3	Feb 2016	Azerbaijan F2, Baku	Futures	Carpet	(Kazakhstan) Timur Khabibulin	(Latvia) Miķelis Lībietis (New Zealand) Ben McLachlan	6–7^{(2–7)}, 7–6^{(7–2)}, [6–10]
Loss	0–4	Apr 2016	Uzbekistan F1, Qarshi	Futures	Hard	(Uzbekistan) Jurabek Karimov	(Chinese Taipei) Chen Ti (India) Sumit Nagal	5–5 ret.
Win	1–4	Apr 2016	Kazakhstan F3, Shymkent	Futures	Clay	(Belarus) Andrei Vasilevski	(Russia) Markos Kalovelonis (Georgia (country)) Aleksandre Metreveli	6–2, 6–4
Loss	1–5	Nov 2016	Kuwait F1, Meshref	Futures	Hard	(Uzbekistan) Shonigmatjon Shofayziyev	(Germany) Daniel Altmaier (Sweden) Fred Simonsson	6–7^{(3–7)}, 2–6
Loss	1–6	Jan 2017	Kazakhstan F1, Aktobe	Futures	Hard	(Kazakhstan) Timur Khabibulin	(Ukraine) Vladyslav Manafov (Russia) Alexander Pavlioutchenkov	3–6, 6–7^{(7–9)}
Win	2–6	Apr 2017	Kazakhstan F3, Shymkent	Futures	Clay	(Russia) Ivan Gakhov	(Czech Republic) Libor Salaba (Slovakia) Adrian Sikora	7–6^{(7–3)}, 6–3
Win	3–6	Apr 2017	Uzbekistan F1, Qarshi	Futures	Hard	(Kazakhstan) Timur Khabibulin	(India) Sriram Balaji (India) Vishnu Vardhan	7–6^{(7–3)}, 6–3
Loss	3–7	Jun 2017	Uzbekistan F4, Namangan	Futures	Hard	(Kazakhstan) Timur Khabibulin	(Ukraine) Vladyslav Manafov (Russia) Denis Matsukevich	4–6, 7–6^{(7–3)}, [8–10]
Loss	3–8	Nov 2017	Vietnam F2, Thu Dau Mot	Futures	Hard	(Kyrgyzstan) Daniiar Duldaev	(Netherlands) Miliaan Niesten (Italy) Francesco Vilardo	2–6, 6–7^{(3–7)}
Loss	3–9	May 2018	Qarshi, Uzbekistan	Challenger	Hard	(Uzbekistan) Jurabek Karimov	(Kazakhstan) Timur Khabibulin (Ukraine) Vladyslav Manafov	2–6, 1–6
Win	4–9	Jun 2018	Uzbekistan F4, Namangan	Futures	Hard	(Uzbekistan) Khumoyun Sultanov	(Russia) Konstantin Kravchuk (Russia) Roman Safiullin	7–6^{(8–6)}, 5–7, [10–8]
Win	5–9	Oct 2018	Tashkent, Uzbekistan	Challenger	Hard	(Uzbekistan) Jurabek Karimov	(Italy) Federico Gaio (Spain) Enrique López Pérez	6–2, 6–7^{(3–7)}, [11–9]
Win	6–9	Dec 2018	Turkey F41, Antalya	Futures	Clay	(Russia) Markos Kalovelonis	(Czech Republic) Tadeáš Paroulek (Ukraine) Oleg Prihodko	7–5, 3–6, [10–6]
Win	7–9	Apr 2019	M25 Shymkent, Kazakhstan	World Tennis Tour	Clay	(Ukraine) Vladyslav Manafov	(Russia) Yan Bondarevskiy (Belarus) Ivan Liutarevich	6–2, 6–1
Loss	7–10	May 2019	M25 Namangan, Uzbekistan	World Tennis Tour	Hard	(Uzbekistan) Khumoyun Sultanov	(Russia) Roman Safiullin (Russia) Evgenii Tiurnev	6–7^{(5–7)}, 3–6
Loss	7–11	Aug 2019	M25 Nonthaburi, Thailand	World Tennis Tour	Hard	(Uzbekistan) Sergey Fomin	(Chinese Taipei) Hsu Yu-hsiou (Japan) Yuta Shimizu	2–6, 3–6
Win	8–11	Oct 2019	M15 Qarshi, Uzbekistan	World Tennis Tour	Hard	(Kazakhstan) Timur Khabibulin	(Russia) Anton Chekhov (Uzbekistan) Khumoyun Sultanov	7–6^{(7–2)}, 6–4
Loss	8–12	Oct 2019	M15 Bukhara, Uzbekistan	World Tennis Tour	Hard	(Kazakhstan) Timur Khabibulin	(Russia) Mikhail Fufygin (Russia) Maxim Ratniuk	6–7^{(5–7)}, 6–7^{(2–7)}
Win	9–12	Dec 2020	M15 Antalya, Turkey	World Tennis Tour	Clay	(Uzbekistan) Sergey Fomin	(Turkey) Umut Akkoyun (Turkey) Mert Naci Türker	7–6^{(7–4)}, 3–6, [10–7]
Win	10–12	Dec 2020	M15 Antalya, Turkey	World Tennis Tour	Clay	(Uzbekistan) Sergey Fomin	(Turkey) Cengiz Aksu (Turkey) Yankı Erel	6–3, 6–4
Win	11–12	Mar 2021	M15 Antalya, Turkey	World Tennis Tour	Clay	(Greece) Markos Kalovelonis	(Romania) Vlad Andrei Dancu (Bulgaria) Gabriel Donev	5–7, 7–6^{(7–3)}, [10–7]
Win	12–12	May 2021	M15 Tbilisi, Georgia	World Tennis Tour	Hard	(Greece) Markos Kalovelonis	(Georgia (country)) Aleksandre Bakshi (Georgia (country)) Zura Tkemaladze	6–4, 3–6, [10–5]
Loss	12–13	May 2021	M15 Shymkent, Kazakhstan	World Tennis Tour	Clay	(Greece) Markos Kalovelonis	(Russia) Yan Bondarevskiy (Kazakhstan) Grigoriy Lomakin	3–6, 4–6
Win	13–13	Jul 2021	M25 Nur-Sultan, Kazakhstan	World Tennis Tour	Hard	(Greece) Markos Kalovelonis	(Ukraine) Oleksii Krutykh (Ukraine) Vladyslav Manafov	7–6^{(7–1)}, 6–3
Win	14–13	Oct 2021	M15 Kazan, Russia	World Tennis Tour	Hard (i)	(Zimbabwe) Benjamin Lock	(Belarus) Aliaksandr Liaonenka (Belarus) Alexander Zgirovsky	6–2, 6–1
Win	15–13	Oct 2021	M25 Nur-Sultan, Kazakhstan	World Tennis Tour	Hard (i)	(Greece) Markos Kalovelonis	(Belarus) Aliaksandr Liaonenka (Russia) Yan Sabanin	6-7^{(7-9)}, 6–4, [10–7]
Win	16–13	Nov 2021	M15 Heraklion, Greece	World Tennis Tour	Hard	(Greece) Markos Kalovelonis	(Australia) William Ma (France) Alexis Musialek	6-4, 6–1
Loss	16-14	Dec 2021	Antalya, Turkey	Challenger	Clay	(Greece) Markos Kalovelonis	(Chinese Taipei) Hsu Yu-hsiou (Ukraine) Oleksii Krutykh	1-6, 6-7^{(5-7)}
Loss	16–15	Feb 2022	M25 Sharm el-Sheikh, Egypt	World Tennis Tour	Hard	(Uzbekistan) Sergey Fomin	(Czech Republic) Marek Gengel (Czech Republic) Lukáš Rosol	4-6, 3–6
Loss	16-16	Mar 2022	Oeiras, Portugal	Challenger	Clay	(Greece) Markos Kalovelonis	(Portugal) Nuno Borges (Portugal) Francisco Cabral	3-6, 0-6
Win	17–16	May 2022	Shymkent, Kazakhstan	Challenger	Clay	(Greece) Markos Kalovelonis	(Denmark) Mikael Torpegaard (Japan) Kaichi Uchida	6–7^{(3–7)}, 6–4, [10–4]
Loss	17-17	Oct 2022	Alicante, Spain	Challenger	Hard	(Uzbekistan) Sergey Fomin	(Netherlands) Robin Haase (France) Albano Olivetti	6–7^{(5–7)}, 5–7

== Davis Cup ==
=== Participations: (7–16) ===
Group membership World Group (0–0) Qualifying Round (1–4) WG Play-off (0–4) Group I (6–8) Group II (0–0) Group III (0–0) Group IV (0–0)	Matches by surface Hard (5–12) Clay (2–2) Grass (0–2) Carpet (0–0)	Matches by type Singles (2–13) Doubles (5–3)

- ▲ ▼ indicates the outcome of the Davis Cup match followed by the score, date, place of event, the zonal classification and its phase, and the court surface.

Rubber outcome	No.	Rubber	Match type (partner if any)	Opponent nation	Opponent player(s)	Score
▼0–5; 12–14 September 2014; Cottesloe Tennis Club, Perth, Australia; World Group Play off; grass surface
Defeat	1	V	Singles (dead rubber)	Australia	Nick Kyrgios	1–6, 1–6
▼2–3; 16–18 September 2016; Olympic Tennis School, Tashkent, Uzbekistan; World Group play-off; clay surface
Defeat	2	II	Singles	Switzerland	Henri Laaksonen	2–6, 2–6, 2–6
▲3–1; 3–5 February 2017; Gimcheon Sports Town Tennis Courts, Gimcheon, South Korea; Asia/Oceania Zone Group I First Round; hard (indoor) surface
Defeat	3	I	Singles	South Korea	Chung Hyeon	4–6, 4–6, 7–6^{(7–5)}, 6–4, 0–6
Victory	4	III	Doubles (with Denis Istomin)	South Korea	Chung Hyeon / Lim Yong-kyu	6–3, 6–7^{(10–12)}, 6–7^{(5–7)}, 7–5, 6–4
▼1–4; 7–9 April 2017; KSLTA Tennis Stadium, Bangalore, India; Asia/Oceania Zone Group I Second Round; hard surface
Defeat	5	II	Singles	India	Prajnesh Gunneswaran	5–7, 6–3, 3–6, 4–6
Defeat	6	III	Doubles (with Farrukh Dustov)	India	Sriram Balaji / Rohan Bopanna	2–6, 4–6, 1–6
Defeat	7	IV	Singles (dead rubber)	India	Ramkumar Ramanathan	3–6, 2–6
▲4–1; 6–7 April 2018; Naval Sports Complex, Islamabad, Pakistan; Asia/Oceania Zone Group I Second Round; grass surface
Defeat	8	II	Singles	Pakistan	Aqeel Khan	7–6^{(8–6)}, 4–6, 4–6
▼1–3; 14–16 September 2018; Emirates Arena, Glasgow, Great Britain; World Group play-off; hard (indoor) surface
Defeat	9	III	Doubles (with Denis Istomin)	(United Kingdom) Great Britain	Dominic Inglot / Jamie Murray	6–4, 6–7^{(8–10)}, 2–6, 3–6
Defeat	10	IV	Singles	(United Kingdom) Great Britain	Cameron Norrie	2–6, 2–6, 0–6
▼2–3; 1–2 February 2019; Saxovat Sport Servis Sport Complex, Tashkent, Uzbekistan; Davis Cup qualifying round; hard (indoor) surface
Defeat	11	I	Singles	Serbia	Dušan Lajović	6–7^{(4–7)}, 3–6
Victory	12	III	Doubles (with Denis Istomin)	Serbia	Nikola Milojević / Viktor Troicki	2–6, 6–1, 6–3
Defeat	13	V	Singles	Serbia	Filip Krajinović	6–4, 3–6, 0–6
▲3–2; 13-14 September 2019; Automobile and Touring Club of Lebanon, Jounieh, Lebanon; Asia/Oceania Group I first round; clay surface
Victory	14	I	Singles	Lebanon	Hady Habib	6–4, 6–4
Victory	15	III	Doubles (with Jurabek Karimov)	Lebanon	Benjamin Hassan / Giovani Samaha	6–2, 5–7, 6–3
Defeat	16	IV	Singles	Lebanon	Benjamin Hassan	6–2, 3–6, 4–6
▼0–4; 6–7 March 2020; Neal S. Blaisdell Center, Honolulu, United States; Davis Cup qualifying round; hard (indoor) surface
Defeat	17	II	Singles	United States	Taylor Fritz	1–6, 2–6
Defeat	18	III	Doubles (with Denis Istomin)	United States	Bob Bryan / Mike Bryan	3–6, 4–6
▼1–3; 17–18 September 2021; Oslo Tennis Arena, Oslo, Norway; World Group I first round; hard (indoor) surface
Victory	19	III	Doubles (with Denis Istomin)	Norway	Viktor Durasovic / Casper Ruud	7–6^{(7–1)}, 6–3
Defeat	20	IV	Singles	Norway	Casper Ruud	3–6, 1–6
▼2–3; 4–5 March 2022; Olympic Tennis School, Tashkent, Uzbekistan; World Group I Qualifying Round; hard (indoor) surface
Victory	21	I	Singles	Turkey	Cem İlkel	6–3, 6–7^{(1–7)}, 6–4
Victory	22	III	Doubles (with Sergey Fomin)	Turkey	Altuğ Çelikbilek / Yankı Erel	6–2, 6–4
Defeat	23	IV	Singles	Turkey	Altuğ Çelikbilek	6–4, 1–6, 4–6
