= 2020 Davis Cup World Group II =

International tennis competition

The 2020 Davis Cup World Group II was held on 5–6 March 2021 and 17–19 September 2021. The eight highest-ranked winners of the World Group II ties automatically progressed to the 2022 Davis Cup World Group I Play-offs. The four lowest-ranked teams took part in an additional knock-out tie in November 2021, with the two winners progressing to the 2022 Davis Cup World Group I Play-offs and two losers contesting the 2022 Davis Cup World Group II Play-offs. The losing nations from the World Group II ties will compete in the 2022 Davis Cup World Group II Play-offs.

== Teams ==
Twenty-four teams participated in the World Group II, in a series decided on a home and away basis. The seedings are based on the Nations Ranking of 9 March.

These twenty-four teams were:

- 12 losing teams from World Group I Play-offs:
- 12 winning teams from World Group II Play-offs:

The 12 winning teams from the World Group II played at the World Group I Play-offs, and the 12 losing teams played at the World Group II Play-offs in 2021.

#: Nations Ranking as of 9 March 2020.

Seeded teams

- China (#39)
- Mexico (#43)
- Switzerland (#44)
- Dominican Republic (#46)
- Lithuania (#47)
- Thailand (#48)
- Poland (#49)
- Slovenia (#50)
- Turkey (#51)
- South Africa (#52)
- Chinese Taipei (#53)
- Barbados (#54)

Unseeded teams

- Venezuela (#55)
- Tunisia (#56)
- Estonia (#57)
- Greece (#58)
- Bulgaria (#59)
- Denmark (#60)
- Morocco (#61)
- Zimbabwe (#62)
- Indonesia (#63)
- El Salvador (#64)
- Paraguay (#65)
- Latvia (#66)

== Results summary ==
Home team	Score	Away team	Location	Venue	Surface
Zimbabwe	w/o	China [1]	Harare	Harare Sports Club	Hard
Bulgaria	1–3	Mexico [2]	Sofia	Sport Hall Sofia	Hard (i)
Switzerland [3]	5–0	Estonia	Biel	Swiss Tennis Arena	Hard (i)
Tunisia	3–2	Dominican Republic [4]	Tunis	Cité Nationale Sportive El Menzah	Hard
Greece	1–3	Lithuania [5]	Heraklion	Lyttos Beach Tennis Academy	Hard
Denmark	4–1	Thailand [6]	Kolding	Sydbank Arena	Hard (i)
Poland [7]	3–1	El Salvador	Kalisz	Arena Kalisz	Hard (i)
Slovenia [8]	3–1	Paraguay	Portorož	Tennis Centre Portoroz	Clay
Turkey [9]	4–0	Latvia	Istanbul	Enka Spor Kulubu	Hard
South Africa [10]	4–0	Venezuela	New York (United States)	Forest Hills Stadium	Hard
Chinese Taipei [11]	w/o	Morocco	—N/a	—N/a	—N/a
Barbados [12]	3–1	Indonesia	Saint Michael	National Tennis Centre	Hard

- China withdrew from its match against Zimbabwe because of the COVID-19 pandemic.
- Chinese Taipei withdrew from its match against Morocco because of the COVID-19 pandemic.

== World Group II results ==
=== Zimbabwe vs. China ===
Zimbabwe
w/o
Harare Sports Club, Harare, Zimbabwe (Note: China withdrew from the tie due to travel restrictions.)
18–19 September 2021
Hard

China

			1	2	3
1	(Zimbabwe) (China)	N/A; N/A				not played
2	(Zimbabwe) (China)	N/A; N/A				not played
3	(Zimbabwe) (China)	N/A; N/A				not played
4	(Zimbabwe) (China)	N/A; N/A				not played
5	(Zimbabwe) (China)	N/A; N/A				not played

=== Bulgaria vs. Mexico ===
Bulgaria
1
Sport Hall Sofia, Sofia, Bulgaria
5–6 March 2021
Hard (i)

Mexico
3

			1	2	3
1	(Bulgaria) (Mexico)	Dimitar Kuzmanov; Luis Patiño	6; 1	6; 1
2	(Bulgaria) (Mexico)	Adrian Andreev; Gerardo López Villaseñor	6; 3	1; 6	2; 6
3	(Bulgaria) (Mexico)	Gabriel Donev / Alexandar Lazarov; Hans Hach Verdugo / Miguel Ángel Reyes-Varela	4; 6	4; 6
4	(Bulgaria) (Mexico)	Dimitar Kuzmanov; Gerardo López Villaseñor	6^{6} 7^{8}	6; 4	6^{5} 7^{7}
5	(Bulgaria) (Mexico)	Adrian Andreev; Luis Patiño				not played

=== Switzerland vs. Estonia ===
Switzerland
5
Swiss Tennis Arena, Biel, Switzerland
17–18 September 2021
Hard (i)

Estonia
0

			1	2	3
1	(Switzerland) (Estonia)	Dominic Stricker; Vladimir Ivanov	6; 3	6; 4
2	(Switzerland) (Estonia)	Henri Laaksonen; Mattias Siimar	6; 4	6; 0
3	(Switzerland) (Estonia)	Marc-Andrea Hüsler / Dominic Stricker; Vladimir Ivanov / Mattias Siimar	6; 4	7^{7} 6^{4}
4	(Switzerland) (Estonia)	Henri Laaksonen; Daniil Glinka	7^{7} 6^{3}	6; 4
5	(Switzerland) (Estonia)	Jérôme Kym; Siim Troost	6; 3	6; 1

=== Tunisia vs. Dominican Republic ===
Tunisia
3
Cité Nationale Sportive El Menzah, Tunis, Tunisia
17–18 September 2021
Hard

Dominican Republic
2

			1	2	3
1	(Tunisia) (Dominican Republic)	Malek Jaziri; Nick Hardt	6; 4	1; 6	5; 6	retired
2	(Tunisia) (Dominican Republic)	Aziz Dougaz; Roberto Cid Subervi	6; 2	6; 4
3	(Tunisia) (Dominican Republic)	Aziz Dougaz / Aziz Ouakaa; Roberto Cid Subervi / Nick Hardt	6; 4	7^{7} 6^{3}
4	(Tunisia) (Dominican Republic)	Aziz Ouakaa; Roberto Cid Subervi	4; 6	2; 6
5	(Tunisia) (Dominican Republic)	Aziz Dougaz; Nick Hardt	6; 3	6; 4

=== Greece vs. Lithuania ===
Greece
1
Lyttos Beach Tennis Academy, Heraklion, Greece
18–19 September 2021
Hard

Lithuania
3

			1	2	3
1	(Greece) (Lithuania)	Petros Tsitsipas; Ričardas Berankis	1; 6	3; 6
2	(Greece) (Lithuania)	Michail Pervolarakis; Laurynas Grigelis	6^{6} 7^{8}	6; 3	5; 7
3	(Greece) (Lithuania)	Markos Kalovelonis / Petros Tsitsipas; Ričardas Berankis / Laurynas Grigelis	2; 6	5; 7
4	(Greece) (Lithuania)	Alexandros Skorilas; Vilius Gaubas	6; 4	6; 4
5	(Greece) (Lithuania)	Petros Tsitsipas; Laurynas Grigelis				not played

=== Denmark vs. Thailand ===
Denmark
4
Sydbank Arena, Kolding, Denmark
17–18 September 2021
Hard (i)

Thailand
1

			1	2	3
1	(Denmark) (Thailand)	Christian Sigsgaard; Wishaya Trongcharoenchaikul	6; 3	6; 2
2	(Denmark) (Thailand)	August Holmgren; Kasidit Samrej	3; 6	7; 5	6; 2
3	(Denmark) (Thailand)	Benjamin Hannestad / Frederik Nielsen; Palaphoom Kovapitukted / Wishaya Trongcharoenchaikul	6; 3	6; 1
4	(Denmark) (Thailand)	August Holmgren; Wishaya Trongcharoenchaikul	6; 4	6; 4
5	(Denmark) (Thailand)	Johannes Ingildsen; Kasidit Samrej	5; 7	3; 6

=== Poland vs. El Salvador ===
Poland
3
Arena Kalisz, Kalisz, Poland
5–6 March 2021
Hard (i)

El Salvador
1

			1	2	3
1	(Poland) (El Salvador)	Kacper Żuk; Marcelo Arévalo	7^{7} 6^{5}	6; 1
2	(Poland) (El Salvador)	Kamil Majchrzak; Lluis Miralles	6; 0	6; 0
3	(Poland) (El Salvador)	Łukasz Kubot / Jan Zieliński; Marcelo Arévalo / Lluis Miralles	6; 4	6; 2
4	(Poland) (El Salvador)	Wojciech Marek; Marcelo Arévalo	4; 6	2; 6
5	(Poland) (El Salvador)	Kacper Żuk; Lluis Miralles				not played

=== Slovenia vs. Paraguay ===
Slovenia
3
Tennis Centre Portoroz, Portorož, Slovenia
17–18 September 2021
Clay

Paraguay
1

			1	2	3
1	(Slovenia) (Paraguay)	Tom Kočevar-Dešman; Adolfo Daniel Vallejo	6; 2	6; 2
2	(Slovenia) (Paraguay)	Bor Artnak; Martín Antonio Vergara del Puerto	1; 6	6; 3	6; 2
3	(Slovenia) (Paraguay)	Tom Kočevar-Dešman / Matic Špec; Adolfo Daniel Vallejo / Martín Antonio Vergara del Puerto	6; 2	6; 2
4	(Slovenia) (Paraguay)	Sebastian Dominko; Hernando José Escurra Isnardi	6; 4	3; 6	7; 10
5	(Slovenia) (Paraguay)	Bor Artnak; Adolfo Daniel Vallejo				not played

=== Turkey vs. Latvia ===
Turkey
4
Enka Spor Kulubu, Istanbul, Turkey
18–19 September 2021
Hard

Latvia
0

			1	2	3
1	(Turkey) (Latvia)	Altuğ Çelikbilek; Robert Strombachs	7^{7} 6^{4}	6; 4
2	(Turkey) (Latvia)	Cem İlkel; Ernests Gulbis	6; 4	6; 1
3	(Turkey) (Latvia)	Altuğ Çelikbilek / Cem İlkel; Ernests Gulbis / Robert Strombachs	2; 6	6; 3	6; 4
4	(Turkey) (Latvia)	Ergi Kırkın; Edgars Maņušis	6; 1	6; 2
5	(Turkey) (Latvia)	Cem İlkel; Robert Strombachs				not played

=== South Africa vs. Venezuela ===
South Africa
4
Forest Hills Stadium, New York, United States
18–19 September 2021
Hard

Venezuela
0

			1	2	3
1	(South Africa) (Venezuela)	Lloyd Harris; Brandon Pérez	6; 0	6; 0
2	(South Africa) (Venezuela)	Philip Henning; Ricardo Rodríguez-Pace	6; 4	6; 4
3	(South Africa) (Venezuela)	Lloyd Harris / Raven Klaasen; Dimitri Badra / Luis David Martínez	6; 2	6; 4
4	(South Africa) (Venezuela)	Ruan Roelofse; Dimitri Badra	6; 4	7^{7} 6^{5}
5	(South Africa) (Venezuela)	Philip Henning; Brandon Pérez				not played

=== Chinese Taipei vs. Morocco ===
Chinese Taipei

Chinese Taipei (Note: Chinese Taipei withdrew from the tie after the Davis Cup Committee considered the Covid-19 restrictions and protocols proposed for the tie by the Chinese Taipei Tennis Association and determined it unfeasible for the tie to be held at home.)

Morocco
w/o

			1	2	3
1	(Chinese Taipei) (Morocco)	N/A; N/A				not played
2	(Chinese Taipei) (Morocco)	N/A; N/A				not played
3	(Chinese Taipei) (Morocco)	N/A; N/A				not played
4	(Chinese Taipei) (Morocco)	N/A; N/A				not played
5	(Chinese Taipei) (Morocco)	N/A; N/A				not played

=== Barbados vs. Indonesia ===
Barbados
3
National Tennis Centre, Saint Michael, Barbados
17–18 September 2021
Hard

Indonesia
1

			1	2	3
1	(Barbados) (Indonesia)	Darian King; Gunawan Trismuwantara	6; 1	6; 1
2	(Barbados) (Indonesia)	Kaipo Marshall; Justin Barki	2; 6	4; 6
3	(Barbados) (Indonesia)	Darian King / Haydn Lewis; Justin Barki / Gunawan Trismuwantara	6; 1	7^{7} 6^{3}
4	(Barbados) (Indonesia)	Darian King; Justin Barki	6; 2	6; 4
5	(Barbados) (Indonesia)	Kaipo Marshall; Gunawan Trismuwantara				not played
