= Gabriel Donev =

Bulgarian tennis player

- Country (sports): Bulgaria
- Born: 29 June 1996 (age 30) Sliven, Bulgaria
- Height: 1.80 m (5 ft 11 in)
- Plays: Right-handed (two-handed backhand)
- Coach: Todor Donev
- Prize money: US $47,915

Singles
- Career record: 0–1 (at ATP Tour level, Grand Slam level, and in Davis Cup)
- Career titles: 0
- Highest ranking: No. 782 (7 October 2019)
- Current ranking: No. 981 (23 December 2024)

Doubles
- Career record: 0–1 (at ATP Tour level, Grand Slam level, and in Davis Cup)
- Career titles: 0
- Highest ranking: No. 533 (19 August 2024)
- Current ranking: No. 810 (23 December 2024)

Gabriel Donev (Bulgarian: Габриел Донев) (born 29 June 1996) is a Bulgarian tennis player. He has a career high ATP singles ranking of world No. 782 achieved on 7 October 2019 and a career high ATP doubles ranking of No. 533 achieved on 19 August 2024.

Donev represents Bulgaria at the Davis Cup, where he has a W/L record of 0–2.

== Year-end ATP ranking ==
Year	2015	2016	2017	2018	2019	2020	2021	2022	2023	2024
Singles	2013	993	1007	843	989	999	820	869	1003	981
Doubles	1435	-	-	971	1022	1043	1155	759	708	810

== Challenger and Futures/World Tennis Tour Finals ==
=== Doubles: 14 (4–10) ===
Legend ATP Challengers (0–0) ITF Futures/World Tennis Tour (4–10)	Titles by surface Hard (0–1) Clay (4–9) Grass (0–0)

Result	W–L	Date	Tournament	Tier	Surface	Partner	Opponents	Score
Loss	0–1	Jun 2015	Bulgaria F2, Burgas	Futures	Clay	(Greece) Eleftherios Theodorou	(Bulgaria) Tihomir Grozdanov (Bulgaria) Alexandar Lazov	5–7, 6–4, [7–10]
Loss	0–2	Aug 2018	Serbia F2, Novi Sad	Futures	Clay	(Bulgaria) Plamen Milushev	(Tunisia) Moez Echargui (Hungary) Péter Nagy	7–5, 4–6, [6–10]
Loss	0–3	Aug 2019	M15 Târgu Mureș, Romania	World Tennis Tour	Clay	(United States) Maksim Tikhomirov	(Argentina) Hernán Casanova (Argentina) Facundo Juárez	2–6, 6–7^{(4–7)}
Loss	0–4	Mar 2021	M15 Antalya, Turkey	World Tennis Tour	Clay	(Romania) Vlad Andrei Dancu	(Uzbekistan) Sanjar Fayziev (Greece) Markos Kalovelonis	7–5, 6–7^{(3–7)}, [7–10]
Loss	0–5	Sep 2021	M15 Ulcinj, Montenegro	World Tennis Tour	Clay	(Bulgaria) Simon Anthony Ivanov	(Argentina) Juan Pablo Paz (Ukraine) Eric Vanshelboim	3–6, 3–6
Loss	0–6	Apr 2022	M15 Dubrovnik, Croatia	World Tennis Tour	Clay	(Bulgaria) Simon Anthony Ivanov	(Croatia) Božo Barun (Croatia) Alen Rogić Hadžalić	4–6, 7–5, [7–10]
Loss	0–7	May 2022	M15 Heraklion, Greece	World Tennis Tour	Hard	(Bulgaria) Simon Anthony Ivanov	(Australia) Aaron Addison (Canada) Kelsey Stevenson	6–7^{(3–7)}, 6–7^{(4–7)}
Loss	0–8	Jun 2022	M15 Budva, Montenegro	World Tennis Tour	Clay	(Bulgaria) Simon Anthony Ivanov	(Belgium) Simon Beaupain (Belgium) Loïc Cloes	4–6, 7–6^{(7–3)}, [3–10]
Win	1–8	Jul 2022	M15 Sofia, Bulgaria	World Tennis Tour	Clay	(Bulgaria) Simon Anthony Ivanov	(Argentina) Juan Ignacio Galarza (Slovenia) Tomás Lipovšek Puches	3–6, 7–5, [11–9]
Win	2–8	Sep 2023	M15 Kuršumlijska Banja, Serbia	World Tennis Tour	Clay	(Bulgaria) Simon Anthony Ivanov	(Italy) Giammarco Gandolfi (Italy) Giannicola Misasi	6–1, 6–2
Win	3–8	Oct 2023	M25 Pazardzhik, Bulgaria	World Tennis Tour	Clay	(Bulgaria) Simon Anthony Ivanov	(Croatia) Matej Dodig (Ukraine) Eric Vanshelboim	6–2, 6–1
Win	4–8	May 2024	M25 Kuršumlijska Banja, Serbia	World Tennis Tour	Clay	(Serbia) Kristijan Juhas	(Serbia) Stefan Popović; Marat Sharipov	6–4, 6–2
Loss	4–9	May 2024	M15 Kuršumlijska Banja, Serbia	World Tennis Tour	Clay	(Bulgaria) Simon Anthony Ivanov	(Japan) Keisuke Saitoh (Japan) Daisuke Sumizawa	4–6, 0–6
Loss	4–10	Aug 2024	M15 Kuršumlijska Banja, Serbia	World Tennis Tour	Clay	(Bulgaria) Simon Anthony Ivanov	(France) Luka Pavlovic (France) Paul Valsecchi	5–7, 7–6^{(7–5)}, [3–10]

== National participation ==
=== Davis Cup (2 losses) ===
Gabriel Donev debuted for the Bulgaria Davis Cup team in 2019. Since then he has 2 nominations with 2 ties played, his singles W/L record is 0–1 and doubles W/L record is 0–1 (0–2 overall).

Group membership World Group (0–0) WG Play-off (0–0) Group I (0–0) Group II (0–2) Group III (0–0) Group IV (0–0)	Matches by surface Hard (0–2) Clay (0–0) Grass (0–0) Carpet (0–0)	Matches by type Singles (0–1) Doubles (0–1)

- ▲ ▼ indicates the result of the Davis Cup match followed by the score, date, place of event, the zonal classification and its phase, and the court surface.

Rubber result	No.	Rubber	Match type (partner if any)	Opponent nation	Opponent player(s)	Score
▼1–4; 13–14 September 2019; Kelvin Grove Club, Cape Town, South Africa; Group II Europe/Africa First Round; Hard surface
Defeat	1	V	Singles	South Africa	Philip Henning	2–6, 3–6
▼1–3; 5–6 March 2021; Sport Hall Sofia, Sofia, Bulgaria; World Group II; Hard (i)surface
Defeat	2	III	Doubles (with Alexandar Lazarov)	Mexico	Hans Hach Verdugo / Miguel Ángel Reyes-Varela	4–6, 4–6
