= 2020 Davis Cup World Group I knock-out stage =

International tennis competition

The 2021 Davis Cup World Group I knock-out stage will be held on 26–28 November 2021. The two winners of this round will qualify for the 2022 Davis Cup qualifying round while the two losers will qualify for the 2022 Davis Cup World Group I play-offs.

== Teams ==
Four teams will play for two spots in the qualifying round, in series decided on a home and away basis. These four teams are the four lowest-ranked winning teams from World Group I.

The two winning teams from the knock-outs will play at the qualifying round and the 2 losing teams will play at the World Group I play-offs.

#: Nations ranking as of 20 September 2021.

Seeded teams

- Ukraine (#33)
- Peru (#35)

Unseeded teams

- Romania (#40)
- Norway (#43)

The draw was held on 22 September 2021.

== Results summary ==
Home team	Score	Away team	Location	Venue	Surface
Norway	3–1	Ukraine [1]	Oslo	Oslo Tennis Arena	Hard (i)
Romania	4–0	Peru [2]	Cluj-Napoca	Horia Demian Sports Hall	Hard (i)

== Knock-out results ==
=== Norway vs. Ukraine ===
Norway
3
Oslo Tennis Arena, Oslo, Norway
26–27 November 2021
Hard (i)

Ukraine
1

			1	2	3
1	(Norway) (Ukraine)	Viktor Durasovic; Illya Marchenko	6; 3	6; 0
2	(Norway) (Ukraine)	Casper Ruud; Vitaliy Sachko	6; 3	6; 2
3	(Norway) (Ukraine)	Viktor Durasovic / Casper Ruud; Denys Molchanov / Sergiy Stakhovsky	6^{4} 7^{7}	3; 6
4	(Norway) (Ukraine)	Casper Ruud; Sergiy Stakhovsky	4; 6	6; 3	7^{7} 6^{4}
5	(Norway) (Ukraine)	Viktor Durasovic; Vitaliy Sachko				not played

=== Romania vs. Peru ===
Romania
4
Horia Demian Sports Hall, Cluj-Napoca, Romania
27–28 November 2021
Hard (i)

Peru
0

			1	2	3
1	(Romania) (Peru)	Nicolae Frunză; Nicolás Álvarez	6; 2	6; 4
2	(Romania) (Peru)	Marius Copil; Conner Huertas del Pino	7; 5	6; 2
3	(Romania) (Peru)	Marius Copil / Horia Tecău; Sergio Galdós / Arklon Huertas del Pino	4; 6	6; 3	6; 2
4	(Romania) (Peru)	Gabi Adrian Boitan; Jorge Panta	6; 4	6; 4
5	(Romania) (Peru)	Nicolae Frunză; Conner Huertas del Pino				not played
