= 2020 Davis Cup qualifying round =

The 2020 Davis Cup qualifying round was held on 6–7 March. The twelve winners of this round would qualify for the 2020 Davis Cup Finals while the twelve losers would qualify for the 2020 Davis Cup World Group I.

== Teams ==
Twenty-four teams played for twelve spots in the Finals, in series decided on a home and away basis.

Twenty-six eligible teams are:

- 14 teams ranked 5th-18th in the Finals.
- 12 winning teams from their Group I zone.

Two wild cards for the Finals were selected from these 26 nations. Serbia and France were announced prior to the Qualifiers draw. The remaining 24 nations will compete for 12 spots in the Finals.

The 12 winning teams from the play-offs would play at the Finals and the 12 losing teams would play at the World Group I.

Seeded teams

- Argentina
- Australia
- Austria
- Belgium
- Croatia
- Czech Republic
- Germany
- Italy
- Japan
- Kazakhstan
- Sweden
- United States

Unseeded teams:

- Belarus
- Brazil
- Chile
- Colombia
- Ecuador
- Hungary
- India
- Slovakia
- South Korea
- Netherlands
- Uruguay
- Uzbekistan

== Results summary ==
Home team	Score	Away team	Location	Venue	Surface
Croatia [1]	3–1	India	Zagreb	Dom Sportova	Hard (i)
Hungary	3–2	Belgium [2]	Debrecen	Főnix Hall	Clay (i)
Colombia	3–1	Argentina [3]	Bogotá	Palacio de los Deportes	Clay (i)
United States [4]	4–0	Uzbekistan	Honolulu	Neal S. Blaisdell Center	Hard (i)
Australia [5]	3–1	Brazil	Adelaide	Memorial Drive Tennis Centre	Hard
Italy [6]	4–0	South Korea	Cagliari	Circolo Tennis Cagliari	Clay
Germany [7]	4–1	Belarus	Düsseldorf	Castello Düsseldorf	Hard (i)
Kazakhstan [8]	3–1	Netherlands	Nur-Sultan	Daulet National Tennis Centre	Hard (i)
Slovakia	1–3	Czech Republic [9]	Bratislava	AXA Aréna NTC	Clay (i)
Austria [10]	3–1	Uruguay	Premstätten	Steiermarkhalle Schwarzlsee	Hard (i)
Japan [11]	0–3	Ecuador	Miki	Bourbon Beans Dome	Hard (i)
Sweden [12]	3–1	Chile	Stockholm	Kungliga tennishallen	Hard (i)

== Qualifying round results ==
=== Croatia vs. India ===
Croatia
3
Dom Sportova, Zagreb, Croatia
6–7 March 2020
Hard (i)

India
1

			1	2	3
1	(Croatia) (India)	Borna Gojo; Prajnesh Gunneswaran	3; 6	6; 4	6; 2
2	(Croatia) (India)	Marin Čilić; Ramkumar Ramanathan	7^{10} 6^{8}	7^{10} 6^{8}
3	(Croatia) (India)	Mate Pavić / Franko Škugor; Rohan Bopanna / Leander Paes	3; 6	7^{11} 6^{9}	5; 7
4	(Croatia) (India)	Marin Čilić; Sumit Nagal	6; 0	6; 1
5	(Croatia) (India)	Borna Gojo; Ramkumar Ramanathan				not played

=== Hungary vs. Belgium ===
Hungary
3
Főnix Hall, Debrecen, Hungary
6–7 March 2020
Clay (i)

Belgium
2

			1	2	3
1	(Hungary) (Belgium)	Attila Balázs; Ruben Bemelmans	7; 5	6^{4} 7^{7}	4; 6
2	(Hungary) (Belgium)	Márton Fucsovics; Kimmer Coppejans	6; 2	5; 7	6; 4
3	(Hungary) (Belgium)	Attila Balázs / Márton Fucsovics; Sander Gillé / Joran Vliegen	6; 3	1; 6	4; 6
4	(Hungary) (Belgium)	Attila Balázs; Kimmer Coppejans	6; 3	6; 0
5	(Hungary) (Belgium)	Márton Fucsovics; Ruben Bemelmans	6^{7} 7^{9}	6; 4	6; 2

=== Colombia vs. Argentina ===
Colombia
3
Palacio de los Deportes, Bogotá, Colombia
6–7 March 2020
Clay (i)

Argentina
1

			1	2	3
1	(Colombia) (Argentina)	Daniel Elahi Galán; Leonardo Mayer	6; 1	6; 4
2	(Colombia) (Argentina)	Santiago Giraldo; Juan Ignacio Londero	7^{8} 6^{6}	3; 6	2; 6
3	(Colombia) (Argentina)	Juan Sebastián Cabal / Robert Farah; Máximo González / Horacio Zeballos	6; 3	6^{3} 7^{7}	7; 5
4	(Colombia) (Argentina)	Daniel Elahi Galán; Juan Ignacio Londero	6; 3	6; 4
5	(Colombia) (Argentina)	Santiago Giraldo; Leonardo Mayer				not played

=== United States vs. Uzbekistan ===
United States
4
Neal S. Blaisdell Center, Honolulu, United States
6–7 March 2020
Hard (i)

Uzbekistan
0

			1	2	3
1	(United States) (Uzbekistan)	Reilly Opelka; Denis Istomin	6; 2	7; 5
2	(United States) (Uzbekistan)	Taylor Fritz; Sanjar Fayziev	6; 1	6; 2
3	(United States) (Uzbekistan)	Bob Bryan / Mike Bryan; Sanjar Fayziev / Denis Istomin	6; 3	6; 4
4	(United States) (Uzbekistan)	Tommy Paul; Denis Istomin	6; 3	6; 0
5	(United States) (Uzbekistan)	Reilly Opelka; Sanjar Fayziev				not played

=== Australia vs. Brazil ===
Australia
3
Memorial Drive Tennis Centre, Adelaide, Australia
6–7 March 2020
Hard

Brazil
1

			1	2	3
1	(Australia) (Brazil)	Jordan Thompson; Thiago Monteiro	6; 4	6; 4
2	(Australia) (Brazil)	John Millman; Thiago Seyboth Wild	4; 6	7^{7} 6^{0}	6; 2
3	(Australia) (Brazil)	James Duckworth / John Peers; Marcelo Demoliner / Felipe Meligeni Alves	7; 5	5; 7	6^{6} 7^{8}
4	(Australia) (Brazil)	John Millman; Thiago Monteiro	6^{6} 7^{8}	7^{7} 6^{3}	7^{7} 6^{3}
5	(Australia) (Brazil)	Jordan Thompson; Thiago Seyboth Wild				not played

=== Italy vs. South Korea ===
Italy
4
Circolo Tennis Cagliari, Cagliari, Italy
6–7 March 2020
Clay

South Korea
0

			1	2	3
1	(Italy) (South Korea)	Fabio Fognini; Lee Duck-hee	6; 0	6; 3
2	(Italy) (South Korea)	Gianluca Mager; Nam Ji-sung	6; 3	7; 5
3	(Italy) (South Korea)	Simone Bolelli / Fabio Fognini; Nam Ji-sung / Song Min-kyu	6; 3	6; 1
4	(Italy) (South Korea)	Stefano Travaglia; Chung Yun-seong	6; 0	6; 1
5	(Italy) (South Korea)	Gianluca Mager; Lee Duck-hee				not played

=== Germany vs. Belarus ===
Germany
4
Castello Düsseldorf, Düsseldorf, Germany
6–7 March 2020
Hard (i)

Belarus
1

			1	2	3
1	(Germany) (Belarus)	Jan-Lennard Struff; Ilya Ivashka	6; 4	6; 4
2	(Germany) (Belarus)	Philipp Kohlschreiber; Egor Gerasimov	6; 4	5; 7	6^{3} 7^{7}
3	(Germany) (Belarus)	Kevin Krawietz / Andreas Mies; Ilya Ivashka / Andrei Vasilevski	6; 4	7^{7} 6^{5}
4	(Germany) (Belarus)	Jan-Lennard Struff; Egor Gerasimov	6; 3	6; 2
5	(Germany) (Belarus)	Dominik Koepfer; Daniil Ostapenkov	6; 0	6; 2

=== Kazakhstan vs. Netherlands ===
Kazakhstan
3
Daulet National Tennis Centre, Nur-Sultan, Kazakhstan
6–7 March 2020
Hard (i)

Netherlands
1

			1	2	3
1	(Kazakhstan) (Netherlands)	Mikhail Kukushkin; Robin Haase	4; 6	7^{7} 6^{2}	3; 6
2	(Kazakhstan) (Netherlands)	Alexander Bublik; Tallon Griekspoor	7^{7} 6^{4}	7^{7} 6^{4}
3	(Kazakhstan) (Netherlands)	Andrey Golubev / Aleksandr Nedovyesov; Robin Haase / Jean-Julien Rojer	6; 3	6; 3
4	(Kazakhstan) (Netherlands)	Alexander Bublik; Robin Haase	7^{7} 6^{4}	6; 1
5	(Kazakhstan) (Netherlands)	Mikhail Kukushkin; Tallon Griekspoor				not played

=== Slovakia vs. Czech Republic ===
Slovakia
1
AXA Aréna NTC, Bratislava, Slovakia
6–7 March 2020
Clay (i)

Czech Republic
3

			1	2	3
1	(Slovakia) (Czech Republic)	Jozef Kovalík; Jiří Veselý	3; 6	5; 7
2	(Slovakia) (Czech Republic)	Andrej Martin; Lukáš Rosol	4; 6	4; 6
3	(Slovakia) (Czech Republic)	Filip Polášek / Igor Zelenay; Jonáš Forejtek / Zdeněk Kolář	6; 4	6; 4
4	(Slovakia) (Czech Republic)	Andrej Martin; Jiří Veselý	6; 4	5; 7	5; 7
5	(Slovakia) (Czech Republic)	Jozef Kovalík; Lukáš Rosol				not played

=== Austria vs. Uruguay ===
Austria
3
Steiermarkhalle Schwarzlsee, Premstätten, Austria
6–7 March 2020
Hard (i)

Uruguay
1

			1	2	3
1	(Austria) (Uruguay)	Dennis Novak; Martín Cuevas	6; 2	6; 4
2	(Austria) (Uruguay)	Jurij Rodionov; Pablo Cuevas	7^{9} 6^{7}	3; 6	6^{5} 7^{7}
3	(Austria) (Uruguay)	Oliver Marach / Jürgen Melzer; Ariel Behar / Pablo Cuevas	4; 6	6; 3	7; 5
4	(Austria) (Uruguay)	Dennis Novak; Pablo Cuevas	2; 6	6; 3	6; 4
5	(Austria) (Uruguay)	Jurij Rodionov; Martín Cuevas				not played

=== Japan vs. Ecuador ===
Japan
0
Bourbon Beans Dome, Miki, Japan
6–7 March 2020
Hard (i)

Ecuador
3

			1	2	3
1	(Japan) (Ecuador)	Go Soeda; Emilio Gómez	5; 7	6^{3} 7^{7}
2	(Japan) (Ecuador)	Yasutaka Uchiyama; Roberto Quiroz	6^{4} 7^{7}	6; 2	6^{8} 7^{10}
3	(Japan) (Ecuador)	Ben McLachlan / Yasutaka Uchiyama; Gonzalo Escobar / Diego Hidalgo	6^{3} 7^{7}	3; 6
4	(Japan) (Ecuador)	Yasutaka Uchiyama; Emilio Gómez				not played
5	(Japan) (Ecuador)	Go Soeda; Roberto Quiroz				not played

=== Sweden vs. Chile ===
Sweden
3
Kungliga tennishallen, Stockholm, Sweden
6–7 March 2020
Hard (i)

Chile
1

			1	2	3
1	(Sweden) (Chile)	Mikael Ymer; Tomás Barrios	6; 2	6; 3
2	(Sweden) (Chile)	Elias Ymer; Alejandro Tabilo	4; 6	3; 6
3	(Sweden) (Chile)	Markus Eriksson / Robert Lindstedt; Tomás Barrios / Alejandro Tabilo	6; 4	6; 4
4	(Sweden) (Chile)	Mikael Ymer; Alejandro Tabilo	3; 6	7; 5	6; 3
5	(Sweden) (Chile)	Elias Ymer; Tomás Barrios				not played
