= 2022 Davis Cup Europe Zone Group IV =

Davis Cup competition in 2022

The Europe Zone was the unique zone within Group 4 of the regional Davis Cup competition in 2022. The zone's competition was held in round robin format in Baku, Azerbaijan, from 27 to 31 July 2022.

== Participating nations ==
- Albania
- Andorra
- Azerbaijan
- Iceland
- Kosovo
- Malta
- San Marino

== Draw ==
Date: 27–30 July 2022

Location: Baku Tennis Academy, Baku, Azerbaijan (hard)

Format: Round-robin basis. One pool of four teams and one pool of three teams. The top two finishers of each pool will play-off against each other to determine the two nations promoted to Europe Group III in 2023.

=== Seeding ===
Pot	Nation	Rank^{1}	Seed
1	San Marino	99	1
1	Malta	116	2
2	Iceland	116	3
2	Andorra	123	4
3	Azerbaijan	127	5
3	Albania	128	6
3	Kosovo	129	7

- ^{1}Davis Cup Rankings as of 8 March 2022

=== Round Robin ===
==== Pool A ====
		SMR	ISL	ALB	RR; W–L	Set; W–L	Game; W–L	Standings
1	San Marino		2–1	3–0	2–0	10–2 (83%)	67–37 (64%)	1
3	Iceland	1–2		3–0	1–1	8–4 (67%)	62–43 (59%)	2
6	Albania	0–3	0–3		0–2	0–12 (0%)	25–74 (25%)	3

==== Pool B ====
		MLT	AZE	AND	KOS	RR; W–L	Set; W–L	Game; W–L	Standings
2	Malta		2–1	2–1	3–0	3–0	16–4 (80%)	109–52 (68%)	1
5	Azerbaijan	1–2		2–1	2–1	2–1	10–9 (53%)	83–85 (49%)	2
4	Andorra	1–2	1–2		2–1	1–2	8–13 (38%)	81–107 (43%)	3
7	Kosovo	0–3	1–2	1–2		0–3	6–14 (30%)	73–102 (42%)	4

Standings are determined by: 1. number of wins; 2. number of matches; 3. in two-team ties, head-to-head records; 4. in three-team ties, (a) percentage of sets won (head-to-head records if two teams remain tied), then (b) percentage of games won (head-to-head records if two teams remain tied), then (c) Davis Cup rankings.

=== Playoffs ===
Placing	A Team	Score	B Team
Promotional	San Marino	2–1	Azerbaijan
Promotional	Iceland	1–2	Malta
5th–6th	Albania	2–1	Andorra
7th	—N/a		Kosovo

- San Marino and Malta were promoted to 2023 Davis Cup Europe Zone Group III.

== Round Robin ==
=== Pool A ===
==== San Marino vs. Albania ====
San Marino
3
Baku Tennis Academy, Baku, Azerbaijan
27 July 2022
Hard

Albania
0

			1	2	3
1	(San Marino) (Albania)	Stefano Galvani; Nermin Hoxhiq	6; 1	6; 0
2	(San Marino) (Albania)	Marco De Rossi; Mario Zili	6; 0	6; 2
3	(San Marino) (Albania)	Marco De Rossi / Domenico Vicini; Martin Muedini / Mario Zili	6; 3	7^{7} 6^{3}

==== Iceland vs. Albania ====
Iceland
3
Baku Tennis Academy, Baku, Azerbaijan
28 July 2022
Hard

Albania
0

			1	2	3
1	(Iceland) (Albania)	Daniel Siddall; Martin Muedini	6; 0	6; 2
2	(Iceland) (Albania)	Rafn Bonifacius; Mario Zili	6; 2	6; 1
3	(Iceland) (Albania)	Rafn Bonifiacius / Daniel Siddall; Nermin Hoxhiq / Mario Zili	7^{7} 6^{1}	6; 2

==== San Marino vs. Iceland ====
San Marino
2
Baku Tennis Academy, Baku, Azerbaijan
29 July 2022
Hard

Iceland
1

			1	2	3
1	(San Marino) (Iceland)	Stefano Galvani; Rafn Bonifacius	6; 4	7; 5
2	(San Marino) (Iceland)	Marco De Rossi; Egill Sigurðsson	6; 3	6; 1
3	(San Marino) (Iceland)	Simone De Luigi / Domenico Vicini; Rafn Bonifacius / Daniel Siddall	2; 6	3; 6

=== Pool B ===
==== Malta vs. Kosovo ====
Malta
3
Baku Tennis Academy, Baku, Azerbaijan
27 July 2022
Hard

Kosovo
0

			1	2	3
1	(Malta) (Kosovo)	Alex Degabriele; Vullnet Tashi	6; 1	6; 2
2	(Malta) (Kosovo)	Matthew Asciak; Jasin Jakupi	6; 1	6; 1
3	(Malta) (Kosovo)	Matthew Asciak / Alex Degabriele; Mal Agushi / Granit Bajraliu	6; 1	6; 1

==== Andorra vs. Azerbaijan ====
Andorra
1
Baku Tennis Academy, Baku, Azerbaijan
27 July 2022
Hard

Azerbaijan
2

			1	2	3
1	(Andorra) (Azerbaijan)	Èric Cervós Noguer; Kanan Gasimov	6^{7} 7^{9}	3; 6
2	(Andorra) (Azerbaijan)	Damien Gelabert; Tamerlan Azizov	2; 6	1; 6
3	(Andorra) (Azerbaijan)	Èric Cervós Noguer / Damien Gelabert; Imran Abdulla / Rasul Gojayev	6; 2	6; 2

==== Malta vs. Azerbaijan ====
Malta
2
Baku Tennis Academy, Baku, Azerbaijan
28 July 2022
Hard

Azerbaijan
1

			1	2	3
1	(Malta) (Azerbaijan)	Matthew Asciak; Kanan Gasimov	6; 0	6; 2
2	(Malta) (Azerbaijan)	Liam Delicata; Tamerlan Azizov	6; 1	3; 6	4; 6
3	(Malta) (Azerbaijan)	Matthew Asciak / Alex Degabriele; Tamerlan Azizov / Kanan Gasimov	7; 5	6; 4

==== Andorra vs. Kosovo ====
Andorra
2
Baku Tennis Academy, Baku, Azerbaijan
28 July 2022
Hard

Kosovo
1

			1	2	3
1	(Andorra) (Kosovo)	Èric Cervós Noguer; Vullnet Tashi	1; 6	1; 6
2	(Andorra) (Kosovo)	Damien Gelabert; Jasin Jakupi	6^{3} 7^{7}	7^{7} 6^{5}	6; 2
3	(Andorra) (Kosovo)	Èric Cervós Noguer / Damien Gelabert; Fresk Sylhasi / Vullnet Tashi	2; 6	7^{9} 6^{7}	6; 4

==== Malta vs. Andorra ====
Malta
2
Baku Tennis Academy, Baku, Azerbaijan
29 July 2022
Hard

Andorra
1

			1	2	3
1	(Malta) (Andorra)	Alex Degabriele; Èric Cervós Noguer	6; 2	6; 1
2	(Malta) (Andorra)	Matthew Asciak; Damien Gelabert	6; 1	6; 3
3	(Malta) (Andorra)	Liam Delicata / Dwayne Lukas Pullicino; Èric Cervós Noguer / Damien Gelabert	2; 6	6; 2	3; 6

==== Azerbaijan vs. Kosovo ====
Azerbaijan
2
Baku Tennis Academy, Baku, Azerbaijan
29 July 2022
Hard

Kosovo
1

			1	2	3
1	(Azerbaijan) (Kosovo)	Kanan Gasimov; Vullnet Tashi	3; 6	3; 6
2	(Azerbaijan) (Kosovo)	Tamerlan Azizov; Jasin Jakupi	6; 4	6; 4
3	(Azerbaijan) (Kosovo)	Tamerlan Azizov / Kanan Gasimov; Jasin Jakupi / Vullnet Tashi	6; 1	6; 2

== Play-offs ==
=== Promotional play-offs ===
==== San Marino vs. Azerbaijan ====
San Marino
2
Baku Tennis Academy, Baku, Azerbaijan
30 July 2022
Hard

Azerbaijan
1

			1	2	3
1	(San Marino) (Azerbaijan)	Stefano Galvani; Kanan Gasimov	6; 2	5; 7	6; 2
2	(San Marino) (Azerbaijan)	Marco De Rossi; Tamerlan Azizov	6; 4	1; 6	5; 7
3	(San Marino) (Azerbaijan)	Marco De Rossi / Stefano Galvani; Tamerlan Azizov / Kanan Gasimov	6; 2	6; 2

==== Malta vs. Iceland ====
Malta
2
Baku Tennis Academy, Baku, Azerbaijan
30 July 2022
Hard

Iceland
1

			1	2	3
1	(Malta) (Iceland)	Alex Degabriele; Rafn Bonifacius	6^{5} 7^{7}	3; 6
2	(Malta) (Iceland)	Matthew Asciak; Egill Sigurðsson	6; 1	6; 0
3	(Malta) (Iceland)	Matthew Asciak / Alex Degabriele; Rafn Bonifacius / Daniel Siddall	4; 6	6; 4	6; 1

=== 5th-place play-offs ===
==== Albania vs. Andorra ====
Albania
2
Baku Tennis Academy, Baku, Azerbaijan
30 July 2022
Hard

Andorra
1

			1	2	3
1	(Albania) (Andorra)	Martin Muedini; Jordi Trilla Clanchet	6; 3	6; 3
2	(Albania) (Andorra)	Mario Zili; Èric Cervós Noguer	6; 3	6; 3
3	(Albania) (Andorra)	Martin Muedini / Mario Zili; Èric Cervós Noguer / Damien Gelabert	2; 6	2; 6
