= 2022 Davis Cup World Group II play-offs =

International tennis competition play-offs

The 2022 Davis Cup World Group II play-offs were held on 4–5 March 2022. The twelve winning teams from the play-offs qualified for the 2022 Davis Cup World Group II and the twelve losing teams would play at the Group III of the corresponding continental zone.

== Teams ==
Twenty-four teams played for twelve spots in the World Group II, in series decided on a home and away basis.

These twenty-four teams are:

- 2 losing teams from World Group II Knock-out ties.
- 12 losing teams from World Group II.
- 10 teams from their Group III zone:
  - 3 from Europe
  - 3 from Asia/Oceania,
  - 2 from Americas, and
  - 2 from Africa.

The 12 winning teams from the play-offs would play at the World Group II and the 12 losing teams will play at the Group III of the corresponding continental zone.

#: Nations Ranking as of 20 September 2021.

Qualified teams

- China (#42)
- Dominican Republic (#48)
- Thailand (#50)
- Chinese Taipei (#53)
- Venezuela (#55)
- Estonia (#58)
- Egypt (#59)
- Greece (#60)
- Morocco (#61)
- Bulgaria (#62)
- Zimbabwe (#63)
- Hong Kong (#64)

- Indonesia (#65)
- Vietnam (#66)
- El Salvador (#67)
- Paraguay (#68)
- Jamaica (#69)
- Latvia (#70)
- Monaco (#71)
- Guatemala (#75)
- Ireland (#77)
- Cyprus (#79=)
- Pacific Oceania (#79=)
- Benin (#81)

== Results summary ==
Home team	Score	Away team	Location	Venue	Surface
China [1]	w/o	Ireland	—N/a	—N/a	—N/a
Dominican Republic [2]	3–0	Vietnam	Santo Domingo	Centro Nacional de Tenis Parque Del Este	Hard
Thailand [3]	2–3	Latvia	Bangkok	Lawn Tennis Association of Thailand	Hard
Guatemala	0–4	Chinese Taipei [4]	Guatemala City	Complejo de Tenis Ing. Juan José Hermosilla	Hard
Indonesia	3–0	Venezuela [5]	Jakarta	Gelora Bung Karno Sports Complex	Hard
Estonia [6]	4–0	Pacific Oceania	Tallinn	Forus Tenniscenter	Hard (i)
Egypt [7]	4–1	Cyprus	Cairo	Gezira Sporting Club	Clay
Greece [8]	3–2	Jamaica	Athens	Ace Tennis Club	Clay (i)
Monaco	4–0	Morocco [9]	Roquebrune-Cap-Martin (France)	Monte Carlo Country Club	Clay
Bulgaria [10]	3–1	Paraguay	Sofia	Sport Hall "Sofia"	Hard (i)
Zimbabwe [11]	1–3	El Salvador	Harare	Harare Sports Club	Hard
Benin	1–3	Hong Kong [12]	Cotonou	Stade de l’Amitié Général Mathieu Kérékou	Hard

== World Group II play-offs results ==
=== China vs. Ireland ===
China

China
4–5 March 2022

Ireland
w/o

			1	2	3
1	(China) (Republic of Ireland)	N/A; N/A				not played
2	(China) (Republic of Ireland)	N/A; N/A				not played
3	(China) (Republic of Ireland)	N/A; N/A				not played
4	(China) (Republic of Ireland)	N/A; N/A				not played
5	(China) (Republic of Ireland)	N/A; N/A				not played

=== Dominican Republic vs. Vietnam ===
Dominican Republic
3
Centro Nacional de Tenis Parque Del Este, Santo Domingo, Dominican Republic
4–5 March 2022
Hard

Vietnam
0

			1	2	3
1	(Dominican Republic) (Vietnam)	Nick Hardt; Trịnh Linh Giang	6; 1	6; 4
2	(Dominican Republic) (Vietnam)	Roberto Cid Subervi; Lý Hoàng Nam	4; 6	6; 3	6; 1
3	(Dominican Republic) (Vietnam)	Peter Bertran / Nick Hardt; Lê Quốc Khánh / Lý Hoàng Nam	6^{7} 7^{9}	6; 4	6; 1
4	(Dominican Republic) (Vietnam)	Alejandro José Gandini; Nguyễn Văn Phương	4; 6	1; 2		not completed
5	(Dominican Republic) (Vietnam)	Roberto Cid Subervi; Trịnh Linh Giang				not played

=== Thailand vs. Latvia ===
Thailand
2
Lawn Tennis Association of Thailand, Muang Thong Thani, Nonthaburi Thailand
4–5 March 2022
Hard

Latvia
3

			1	2	3
1	(Thailand) (Latvia)	Kasidit Samrej; Robert Strombachs	6^{4} 7^{7}	6; 3	4; 6
2	(Thailand) (Latvia)	Yuttana Charoenphon; Ernests Gulbis	4; 6	2; 6
3	(Thailand) (Latvia)	Pruchya Isaro / Thantub Suksumrarn; Ernests Gulbis / Robert Strombachs	4; 6	7; 5	6; 0
4	(Thailand) (Latvia)	Kasidit Samrej; Ernests Gulbis	4; 6	6; 4	4; 6
5	(Thailand) (Latvia)	Yuttana Charoenphon; Reinis Kupfers	6; 2	6; 4

=== Guatemala vs. Chinese Taipei ===
Guatemala
0
Complejo de Tenis Ing. Juan José Hermosilla, Guatemala City, Guatemala
4–5 March 2022
Hard

Chinese Taipei
4

			1	2	3
1	(Guatemala) (Chinese Taipei)	Wilfredo González; Wu Tung-lin	0; 6	3; 6
2	(Guatemala) (Chinese Taipei)	Christopher Díaz Figueroa; Tseng Chun-hsin	5; 7	4; 6
3	(Guatemala) (Chinese Taipei)	Christopher Díaz Figueroa / Wilfredo González; Hsu Yu-hsiou / Wu Tung-lin	4; 6	3; 6
4	(Guatemala) (Chinese Taipei)	Sebastián Domínguez; Tseng Chun-hsin	4; 6	3; 6
5	(Guatemala) (Chinese Taipei)	Christopher Díaz Figueroa; Wu Tung-lin				not played

=== Indonesia vs. Venezuela ===
Indonesia
3
Gelora Bung Karno Sports Complex, Jakarta, Indonesia
4–5 March 2022
Hard

Venezuela
0

			1	2	3
1	(Indonesia) (Venezuela)	Fitriadi Rifqi; Francisco Lamas Villarroel	6; 3	6; 4
2	(Indonesia) (Venezuela)	Christopher Rungkat; Luis David Martínez	7^{7} 6^{4}	6; 1
3	(Indonesia) (Venezuela)	Fitriadi Rifqi / Christopher Rungkat; Luis David Martínez / Jordi Muñoz Abreu	6; 1	7; 5
4	(Indonesia) (Venezuela)	Achad Imam Maruf; Jordi Muñoz Abreu	5; 4			not completed
5	(Indonesia) (Venezuela)	Christopher Rungkat; Francisco Lamas Villarroel				not played

=== Estonia vs. Pacific Oceania ===
Estonia
4
Forus Tenniscenter, Tallinn, Estonia
4–5 March 2022
Hard (i)

Pacific Oceania
0

			1	2	3
1	(Estonia) (Pacific Oceania)	Jürgen Zopp; Clément Mainguy	6; 2	6; 4
2	(Estonia) (Pacific Oceania)	Mark Lajal; Colin Sinclair	7; 5	7; 5
3	(Estonia) (Pacific Oceania)	Kenneth Raisma / Jürgen Zopp; Brett Baudinet / Colin Sinclair	6; 4	6; 2
4	(Estonia) (Pacific Oceania)	Vladimir Ivanov; Matthew Stubbings	6; 2	6; 2
5	(Estonia) (Pacific Oceania)	Mark Lajal; Clément Mainguy				not played

=== Egypt vs. Cyprus ===
Egypt
4
Gezira Sporting Club, Cairo, Egypt
4–5 March 2022
Clay

Cyprus
1

			1	2	3
1	(Egypt) (Cyprus)	Mohamed Safwat; Menelaos Efstathiou	6; 3	6; 2
2	(Egypt) (Cyprus)	Karim-Mohamed Maamoun; Petros Chrysochos	3; 6	4; 6
3	(Egypt) (Cyprus)	Karim-Mohamed Maamoun / Mohamed Safwat; Petros Chrysochos / Eleftherios Neos	4; 6	6; 3	6; 4
4	(Egypt) (Cyprus)	Mohamed Safwat; Petros Chrysochos	5; 7	6; 2	6; 0
5	(Egypt) (Cyprus)	Amr Elsayed; Stylianos Christodoulou	6; 3	6; 3

=== Greece vs. Jamaica ===
Greece
3
Ace Tennis Club, Athens, Greece
4–5 March 2022
Clay (i)

Jamaica
2

			1	2	3
1	(Greece) (Jamaica)	Michail Pervolarakis; Rowland Phillips	2; 6	6; 4	3; 6
2	(Greece) (Jamaica)	Petros Tsitsipas; Blaise Bicknell	3; 6	5; 7
3	(Greece) (Jamaica)	Markos Kalovelonis / Petros Tsitsipas; Blaise Bicknell / Rowland Phillips	6; 2	6; 3
4	(Greece) (Jamaica)	Aristotelis Thanos; Blaise Bicknell	6; 4	6; 4
5	(Greece) (Jamaica)	Petros Tsitsipas; Rowland Phillips	4; 6	6; 4	6; 4

=== Monaco vs. Morocco ===
Monaco
4
Monte Carlo Country Club, Roquebrune-Cap-Martin, France
4–5 March 2022
Clay

Morocco
0

			1	2	3
1	(Monaco) (Morocco)	Lucas Catarina; Adam Moundir	6; 3	6; 4
2	(Monaco) (Morocco)	Valentin Vacherot; Elliot Benchetrit	6; 2	6; 4
3	(Monaco) (Morocco)	Romain Arneodo / Hugo Nys; Elliot Benchetrit / Lamine Ouahab	6; 1	6; 2
4	(Monaco) (Morocco)	Lucas Catarina; Yassine Dlimi	7; 5	6; 1
5	(Monaco) (Morocco)	Valentin Vacherot; Adam Moundir				not played

=== Bulgaria vs. Paraguay ===
Bulgaria
3
Sport Hall "Sofia", Sofia, Bulgaria
4–5 March 2022
Hard (i)

Paraguay
1

			1	2	3
1	(Bulgaria) (Paraguay)	Dimitar Kuzmanov; Hernando José Escurra Isnardi	7^{7} 6^{5}	6; 0
2	(Bulgaria) (Paraguay)	Alexandar Lazarov; Daniel Vallejo	6; 4	6; 1
3	(Bulgaria) (Paraguay)	Alexander Donski / Alexandar Lazarov; Juan Borba / Hernando José Escurra Isnardi	6; 3	7; 5
4	(Bulgaria) (Paraguay)	Petr Nesterov; Daniel Vallejo	6^{6} 7^{8}	7^{7} 6^{2}	5; 10
5	(Bulgaria) (Paraguay)	Alexandar Lazarov; Hernando José Escurra Isnardi				not played

=== Zimbabwe vs. El Salvador ===
Zimbabwe
1
Harare Sports Club, Harare, Zimbabwe
4–5 March 2022
Hard

El Salvador
3

			1	2	3
1	(Zimbabwe) (El Salvador)	Benjamin Lock; Lluis Miralles	6; 1	6; 1
2	(Zimbabwe) (El Salvador)	Mehluli Don Ayanda Sibanda; Marcelo Arévalo	6; 4	3; 6	6^{8} 7^{10}
3	(Zimbabwe) (El Salvador)	Benjamin Lock / Courtney John Lock; Marcelo Arévalo / Lluis Miralles	6; 4	3; 6	2; 6
4	(Zimbabwe) (El Salvador)	Benjamin Lock; Marcelo Arévalo	3; 6	7; 5	4; 6
5	(Zimbabwe) (El Salvador)	Mehluli Don Ayanda Sibanda; Lluis Miralles				not played

=== Benin vs. Hong Kong ===
Benin
1
Stade de l’Amitié Général Mathieu Kérékou, Cotonou, Benin
4–5 March 2022
Hard

Hong Kong
3

			1	2	3
1	(Benin) (Hong Kong)	Alexis Klégou; Wong Hong-kit	6; 1	4; 6	1; 5	retired
2	(Benin) (Hong Kong)	Delmas N'tcha; Coleman Wong	4; 6	4; 6
3	(Benin) (Hong Kong)	Alexis Klégou / Sylvestre Monnou; Coleman Wong / Wong Hong-kit	2; 6	6; 1	4; 6
4	(Benin) (Hong Kong)	Sylvestre Monnou; Ng Ki-lung	6; 4	6; 4
5	(Benin) (Hong Kong)	Delmas N'tcha; Wong Hong-kit				not played
