= Mehluli Don Ayanda Sibanda =

Zimbabwean tennis player (born 1999)

- Country (sports): Zimbabwe
- Born: 6 November 1999 (age 25)
- Plays: Right-handed (two-handed backhand)
- Prize money: $8,780

Singles
- Career record: 0–2 (at ATP Tour level, Grand Slam level, and in Davis Cup)
- Career titles: 0
- Highest ranking: No. 750 (7 March 2020)
- Current ranking: No. 784 (20 February 2021)

Doubles
- Career record: 0–0 (at ATP Tour level, Grand Slam level, and in Davis Cup)
- Career titles: 0
- Highest ranking: No. 1,041 (21 October 2019)
- Current ranking: No. 1,041 (21 October 2019)

Team competitions
- Davis Cup: 0–2
- Last updated on: 21 October 2018.

Mehluli Don Ayanda Sibanda (born 6 November 1999) is a Zimbabwean tennis player.

Sibanda has a career high ATP singles ranking of 861 achieved on 21 October 2019.

Sibanda has represented Zimbabwe at the Davis Cup, where he has a win-loss record of 0–2.

== ATP Challenger and ITF Futures finals ==
=== Singles: 1 (0–1) ===
Legend ATP Challenger (0–0) ITF Futures (0–1)	Finals by surface Hard (0–1) Clay (0–0) Grass (0–0) Carpet (0–0)

Result	W–L	Date	Tournament	Tier	Surface	Opponent	Score
Loss	0–1	Oct 2022	M15 Maputo, Mozambique	World Tennis Tour	Hard	(South Africa) Kris van Wyk	7–5, 3–6, 0–6

=== Doubles 1 (0–1) ===
Legend (doubles) ATP Challenger Tour (0–0) ITF World Tennis Tour (0–1)	Titles by surface Hard (0–1) Clay (0–0) Grass (0–0) Carpet (0–0)

Result	W–L	Date	Tournament	Tier	Surface	Partner	Opponents	Score
Loss	0–1	Oct 2019	M15 Pretoria, South Africa	World Tennis Tour	Hard	(Austria) David Pichler	(Bulgaria) Alexander Donski (Canada) Raheel Manji	2–6, 5–7
