= 2020 Davis Cup World Group I =

The 2020 Davis Cup World Group I was held on 5–6 March 2021 and 17–19 September 2021. The eight highest-ranked winners of the World Group I ties automatically progressed to the 2022 Davis Cup qualifying round. The four lowest-ranked winners took part in an additional knock-out tie in November 2021, the two winners progressing to the 2022 Davis Cup qualifying round and the two losers contesting the 2022 Davis Cup World Group I play-offs. The losing nations from the World Group I ties will compete in the 2022 Davis Cup World Group I play-offs.

== Teams ==
Twenty-four teams participated in the World Group I, in a series decided on a home and away basis. The seedings are based on the nations ranking of 9 March.

These twenty-four teams were:

- 12 losing teams from the qualifying round
- 12 winning teams from World Group I play-offs

The eight highest-ranked (as at 20 September 2021) winners of the World Group I ties automatically progressed to the 2022 qualifiers. The four lowest-ranked winners took part in an additional knock-out tie in November 2021, with the two winners progressing to the 2022 qualifiers and two losers contesting the 2022 World Group I play-offs. The losing nations from the World Group I ties will compete in the World Group I play-offs in 2022.

#: Nations ranking as of 9 March 2020.

Seeded teams

- Belgium (#4)
- Argentina (#16)
- Japan (#19)
- Netherlands (#20)
- Chile (#21)
- India (#22)
- Uzbekistan (#25)
- Brazil (#26)
- South Korea (#27)
- Portugal (#28)
- Bosnia and Herzegovina (#29)
- Israel (#30)

Unseeded teams

- Slovakia (#31)
- Uruguay (#32)
- Finland (#33)
- Pakistan (#34)
- Ukraine (#35)
- Lebanon (#36)
- New Zealand (#37)
- Peru (#38)
- Bolivia (#40)
- Romania (#41)
- Belarus (#42)
- Norway (#45)

== Results summary ==
Home team	Score	Away team	Location	Venue	Surface
Bolivia	2–3	Belgium [1]	Asunción (Paraguay)	Rakiura Resort	Clay
Argentina [2]	4–1	Belarus	Buenos Aires	Buenos Aires Lawn Tennis Club	Clay
Pakistan	0–4	Japan [3]	Islamabad	Pakistan Sports Complex	Grass
Uruguay	0–4	Netherlands [4]	Montevideo	Carrasco Lawn Tenis Club	Clay
Slovakia	3–1	Chile [5]	Bratislava	NTC Arena	Hard (i)
Finland	3–1	India [6]	Espoo	Espoo Metro Areena	Hard (i)
Norway	3–1	Uzbekistan [7]	Oslo	Oslo Tennis Arena	Hard (i)
Lebanon	0–4	Brazil [8]	Jounieh	Automobile and Touring Club of Lebanon	Clay
New Zealand	1–3	South Korea [9]	Newport (United States)	International Tennis Hall of Fame	Grass
Romania	3–1	Portugal [10]	Cluj-Napoca	Horia Demian Sports Hall	Hard (i)
Peru	3–2	Bosnia and Herzegovina [11]	Lima	Club Lawn Tennis de la Exposición	Clay
Ukraine	3–2	Israel [12]	Kyiv	Marina Tennis Club	Hard (i)

== World Group I results ==
=== Bolivia vs. Belgium ===
Bolivia
2
Rakiura Resort, Asunción, Paraguay
18–19 September 2021
Clay

Belgium
3

			1	2	3
1	(Bolivia) (Belgium)	Hugo Dellien; Ruben Bemelmans	6; 3	6; 4
2	(Bolivia) (Belgium)	Murkel Dellien; Zizou Bergs	6; 4	4; 6	6; 2
3	(Bolivia) (Belgium)	Boris Arias / Federico Zeballos; Sander Gillé / Joran Vliegen	3; 6	4; 6
4	(Bolivia) (Belgium)	Hugo Dellien; Michael Geerts	4; 6	6; 4	2; 6
5	(Bolivia) (Belgium)	Murkel Dellien; Ruben Bemelmans	6^{2} 7^{7}	2; 6

=== Argentina vs. Belarus ===
Argentina
4
Buenos Aires Lawn Tennis Club, Buenos Aires, Argentina
18–19 September 2021
Clay

Belarus
1

			1	2	3
1	(Argentina) (Belarus)	Diego Schwartzman; Daniil Ostapenkov	4; 6	3; 6
2	(Argentina) (Belarus)	Guido Pella; Erik Arutiunian	6; 1	6; 2
3	(Argentina) (Belarus)	Máximo González / Horacio Zeballos; Erik Arutiunian / Daniil Ostapenkov	5; 7	6; 2	6; 2
4	(Argentina) (Belarus)	Diego Schwartzman; Alexander Zgirovsky	6; 1	6; 2
5	(Argentina) (Belarus)	Federico Coria; Daniil Ostapenkov	6; 3	6; 1

=== Pakistan vs. Japan ===
Pakistan
0
Pakistan Sports Complex, Islamabad, Pakistan
5–6 March 2021
Grass

Japan
4

			1	2	3
1	(Pakistan) (Japan)	Aqeel Khan; Yosuke Watanuki	3; 6	2; 6
2	(Pakistan) (Japan)	Aisam-ul-Haq Qureshi; Kaichi Uchida	4; 6	6^{4} 7^{7}
3	(Pakistan) (Japan)	Aqeel Khan / Aisam-ul-Haq Qureshi; Shintaro Mochizuki / Sho Shimabukuro	6; 4	4; 6	2; 6
4	(Pakistan) (Japan)	Muzammil Murtaza; Yuta Shimizu	1; 6	1; 6
5	(Pakistan) (Japan)	Aqeel Khan; Kaichi Uchida				not played

=== Uruguay vs. Netherlands ===
Uruguay
0
Carrasco Lawn Tenis Club, Montevideo, Uruguay
18–19 September 2021
Clay

Netherlands
4

			1	2	3
1	(Uruguay) (Netherlands)	Francisco Llanes; Botic van de Zandschulp	0; 6	3; 6
2	(Uruguay) (Netherlands)	Martín Cuevas; Tallon Griekspoor	4; 6	6^{6} 7^{8}
3	(Uruguay) (Netherlands)	Ignacio Carou / Martín Cuevas; Wesley Koolhof / Matwé Middelkoop	2; 6	1; 6
4	(Uruguay) (Netherlands)	Ignacio Carou; Robin Haase	3; 6	2; 6
5	(Uruguay) (Netherlands)	Francisco Llanes; Tallon Griekspoor				not played

=== Slovakia vs. Chile ===
Slovakia
3
NTC Arena, Bratislava, Slovakia
17–18 September 2021
Hard (i)

Chile
1

			1	2	3
1	(Slovakia) (Chile)	Alex Molčan; Cristian Garín	2; 6	4; 6
2	(Slovakia) (Chile)	Norbert Gombos; Nicolás Jarry	6; 3	6^{5} 7^{7}	6; 3
3	(Slovakia) (Chile)	Filip Polášek / Igor Zelenay; Marcelo Tomás Barrios Vera / Alejandro Tabilo	6; 1	7^{7} 6^{4}
4	(Slovakia) (Chile)	Norbert Gombos; Cristian Garín	6; 0	6; 1
5	(Slovakia) (Chile)	Alex Molčan; Nicolás Jarry				not played

=== Finland vs. India ===
Finland
3
Espoo Metro Areena, Espoo, Finland
17–18 September 2021
Hard (i)

India
1

			1	2	3
1	(Finland) (India)	Otto Virtanen; Prajnesh Gunneswaran	6; 3	7^{7} 6^{1}
2	(Finland) (India)	Emil Ruusuvuori; Ramkumar Ramanathan	6; 4	7; 5
3	(Finland) (India)	Harri Heliövaara / Henri Kontinen; Rohan Bopanna / Ramkumar Ramanathan	7^{7} 6^{2}	7^{7} 6^{2}
4	(Finland) (India)	Patrik Niklas-Salminen; Prajnesh Gunneswaran	3; 6	5; 7
5	(Finland) (India)	Otto Virtanen; Ramkumar Ramanathan				not played

=== Norway vs. Uzbekistan ===
Norway
3
Oslo Tennis Arena, Oslo, Norway
17–18 September 2021
Hard (i)

Uzbekistan
1

			1	2	3
1	(Norway) (Uzbekistan)	Casper Ruud; Khumoyun Sultanov	6; 3	6; 3
2	(Norway) (Uzbekistan)	Viktor Durasovic; Denis Istomin	6; 4	6; 4
3	(Norway) (Uzbekistan)	Casper Ruud / Viktor Durasovic; Sanjar Fayziev / Denis Istomin	6^{1} 7^{7}	3; 6
4	(Norway) (Uzbekistan)	Casper Ruud; Sanjar Fayziev	6; 3	6; 1
5	(Norway) (Uzbekistan)	Viktor Durasovic; Khumoyun Sultanov				not played

=== Lebanon vs. Brazil ===
Lebanon
0
Automobile and Touring Club of Lebanon, Jounieh, Lebanon
18–19 September 2021
Clay

Brazil
4

			1	2	3
1	(Lebanon) (Brazil)	Benjamin Hassan; Orlando Luz	4; 6	4; 6
2	(Lebanon) (Brazil)	Hady Habib; Felipe Meligeni Alves	1; 6	3; 6
3	(Lebanon) (Brazil)	Hady Habib / Benjamin Hassan; Marcelo Demoliner / Rafael Matos	2; 6	6; 3	6^{5} 7^{7}
4	(Lebanon) (Brazil)	Roey Tabet; Matheus Pucinelli de Almeida	0; 6	1; 6
5	(Lebanon) (Brazil)	Hady Habib; Orlando Luz				not played

=== New Zealand vs. South Korea ===
New Zealand
1
International Tennis Hall of Fame, Newport, United States
17–18 September 2021
Grass

South Korea
3

			1	2	3
1	(New Zealand) (South Korea)	Rubin Statham; Nam Ji-sung	2; 6	2; 6
2	(New Zealand) (South Korea)	Finn Reynolds; Kwon Soon-woo	6^{1} 7^{7}	3; 6
3	(New Zealand) (South Korea)	Marcus Daniell / Michael Venus; Nam Ji-sung / Song Min-kyu	4; 6	6; 2	6; 4
4	(New Zealand) (South Korea)	Rubin Statham; Kwon Soon-woo	3; 6	3; 6
5	(New Zealand) (South Korea)	Finn Reynolds; Nam Ji-sung				not played

=== Romania vs. Portugal ===
Romania
3
Horia Demian Sports Hall, Cluj-Napoca, Romania
18–19 September 2021
Hard (i)

Portugal
1

			1	2	3
1	(Romania) (Portugal)	Filip Jianu; João Sousa	3; 6	5; 7
2	(Romania) (Portugal)	Marius Copil; Gastão Elias	6; 4	6; 3
3	(Romania) (Portugal)	Marius Copil / Horia Tecău; Nuno Borges / João Sousa	6; 4	6; 3
4	(Romania) (Portugal)	Marius Copil; João Sousa	6; 3	2; 6	6; 4
5	(Romania) (Portugal)	Filip Jianu; Gastão Elias				not played

=== Peru vs. Bosnia and Herzegovina ===
Peru
3
Club Lawn Tennis de la Exposición, Lima, Peru
17–18 September 2021
Clay

Bosnia and Herzegovina
2

			1	2	3
1	(Peru) (Bosnia and Herzegovina)	Nicolás Álvarez; Damir Džumhur	2; 6	7^{7} 6^{4}	3; 6
2	(Peru) (Bosnia and Herzegovina)	Juan Pablo Varillas; Mirza Bašić	7; 5	7^{9} 6^{7}
3	(Peru) (Bosnia and Herzegovina)	Sergio Galdós / Jorge Panta; Mirza Bašić / Tomislav Brkić	5; 7	2; 6
4	(Peru) (Bosnia and Herzegovina)	Juan Pablo Varillas; Damir Džumhur	6; 1	6; 3
5	(Peru) (Bosnia and Herzegovina)	Nicolás Álvarez; Nerman Fatić	7^{7} 6^{4}	6; 4

=== Ukraine vs. Israel ===
Ukraine
3
Marina Tennis Club, Kyiv, Ukraine
5–6 March 2021
Hard (i)

Israel
2

			1	2	3
1	(Ukraine) (Israel)	Illya Marchenko; Daniel Cukierman	1; 6	6; 3	6; 2
2	(Ukraine) (Israel)	Sergiy Stakhovsky; Edan Leshem	3; 6	6; 3	2; 6
3	(Ukraine) (Israel)	Denys Molchanov / Sergiy Stakhovsky; Daniel Cukierman / Jonathan Erlich	4; 6	6; 4	3; 6
4	(Ukraine) (Israel)	Illya Marchenko; Edan Leshem	6; 3	6; 2
5	(Ukraine) (Israel)	Sergiy Stakhovsky; Yshai Oliel	6; 4	6; 2
