= 2022 Davis Cup World Group I play-offs =

International tennis competition play-offs

The 2022 Davis Cup World Group I play-offs were held on 4–6 March 2022. The twelve winners of this round qualified for the 2022 Davis Cup World Group I while the twelve losers qualified for the 2022 Davis Cup World Group II.

== Teams ==
Twenty-four teams played for twelve spots in the World Group I, in series decided on a home and away basis.

These twenty-four teams are:

- 2 losing teams from World Group I Knock-out ties.
- 12 losing teams from World Group I.
- 8 winning teams from World Group II.
- 2 winning teams from World Group II Knock-out ties.

The 12 winning teams from the play-offs would play at the World Group I and the 12 losing teams would play at the World Group II.

#: Nations Ranking as of 20 September 2021.

Qualified teams

- Chile (#21)
- India (#22)
- Uzbekistan (#25)
- Portugal (#28)
- Bosnia and Herzegovina (#29)
- Israel (#31)
- Uruguay (#33)
- Ukraine (#34)
- Pakistan (#35)
- Peru (#36)
- Lebanon (#37)
- Mexico (#38)
- Lithuania (#39)
- New Zealand (#40)
- Bolivia (#43)
- Switzerland (#45)
- Belarus (#46)
- Poland (#47)
- Slovenia (#49)
- Turkey (#51)
- South Africa (#52)
- Barbados (#54)
- Tunisia (#56)
- Denmark (#57)

== Results summary ==
Home team	Score	Away team	Location	Venue	Surface
Chile [1]	4–0	Slovenia	Viña del Mar	Club Union de Tenis	Clay
India [2]	4–0	Denmark	New Delhi	Delhi Gymkhana Club	Grass
Uzbekistan [3]	2–3	Turkey	Tashkent	Olympic Tennis School	Hard (i)
Portugal [4]	4–0	Poland	Porto	Complexo Municipal de Ténis da Maia	Clay (i)
Tunisia	1–3	Bosnia and Herzegovina [5]	Tunis	Tennis Club de Tunis	Clay
Israel [6]	3–1	South Africa	Ashdod	HaKiriya Arena	Hard (i)
New Zealand	3–1	Uruguay [7]	Las Vegas (United States)	Darling Tennis Center	Hard
Ukraine [8]	3–0	Barbados	Antalya (Turkey)	Rixos Premium Belek	Hard
Pakistan [9]	3–2	Lithuania	Islamabad	Pakistan Sports Complex	Grass
Peru [10]	3–1	Bolivia	Lima	Club Lawn Tennis de La Exposición	Clay
Switzerland	3–1	Lebanon [11]	Biel/Bienne	Jan Group Arena	Hard (i)
Mexico [12]	w/o	Belarus	Mexico City	Estadio Rafael Osuna	Clay

== World Group I play-offs results ==
=== Chile vs. Slovenia ===
Chile
4
Club Union de Tenis, Viña del Mar, Chile
4–5 March 2022
Clay

Slovenia
0

			1	2	3
1	(Chile) (Slovenia)	Alejandro Tabilo; Bor Artnak	6; 3	6; 3
2	(Chile) (Slovenia)	Nicolás Jarry; Blaž Rola	6; 3	3; 6	7; 5
3	(Chile) (Slovenia)	Tomás Barrios Vera / Alejandro Tabilo; Sebastian Dominko / Blaž Rola	6; 2	6; 3
4	(Chile) (Slovenia)	Diego Fernández Flores; Sebastian Dominko	3; 6	7^{7} 6^{4}	10; 2
5	(Chile) (Slovenia)	Nicolás Jarry; Bor Artnak				not played

=== India vs. Denmark ===
India
4
Delhi Gymkhana Club, New Delhi, India
4–5 March 2022
Grass

Denmark
0

			1	2	3
1	(India) (Denmark)	Ramkumar Ramanathan; Christian Sigsgaard	6; 3	6; 2
2	(India) (Denmark)	Yuki Bhambri; Mikael Torpegaard	6; 4	6; 4
3	(India) (Denmark)	Rohan Bopanna / Divij Sharan; Frederik Nielsen / Mikael Torpegaard	6^{3} 7^{7}	6; 4	7^{7} 6^{4}
4	(India) (Denmark)	Ramkumar Ramanathan; Johannes Ingildsen	5; 7	7; 5	10; 7
5	(India) (Denmark)	Yuki Bhambri; Christian Sigsgaard				not played

=== Uzbekistan vs. Turkey ===
Uzbekistan
2
Olympic Tennis School, Tashkent, Uzbekistan
4–5 March 2022
Hard (i)

Turkey
3

			1	2	3
1	(Uzbekistan) (Turkey)	Sanjar Fayziev; Cem İlkel	6; 3	6^{1} 7^{7}	6; 4
2	(Uzbekistan) (Turkey)	Sergey Fomin; Altuğ Çelikbilek	3; 6	4; 6
3	(Uzbekistan) (Turkey)	Sanjar Fayziev / Sergey Fomin; Altuğ Çelikbilek / Yankı Erel	6; 2	6; 4
4	(Uzbekistan) (Turkey)	Sanjar Fayziev; Altuğ Çelikbilek	6; 4	1; 6	4; 6
5	(Uzbekistan) (Turkey)	Sergey Fomin; Cem İlkel	6^{2} 7^{7}	6^{4} 7^{7}

=== Portugal vs. Poland ===
Portugal
4
Complexo Municipal de Ténis da Maia, Porto, Portugal
4–5 March 2022
Clay (i)

Poland
0

			1	2	3
1	(Portugal) (Poland)	João Sousa; Kacper Żuk	6; 3	2; 6	6; 4
2	(Portugal) (Poland)	Nuno Borges; Kamil Majchrzak	3; 6	6; 4	6; 3
3	(Portugal) (Poland)	Nuno Borges / Francisco Cabral; Szymon Walków / Jan Zieliński	3; 6	6; 3	6; 4
4	(Portugal) (Poland)	Gastão Elias; Jan Zieliński	6; 1	6; 3
5	(Portugal) (Poland)	Nuno Borges; Kacper Żuk				not played

=== Tunisia vs. Bosnia and Herzegovina ===
Tunisia
1
Tennis Club de Tunis, Tunis, Tunisia
4–6 March 2022
Clay

Bosnia and Herzegovina
3

			1	2	3
1	(Tunisia) (Bosnia and Herzegovina)	Moez Echargui; Damir Džumhur	3; 6	6; 3	5; 7
2	(Tunisia) (Bosnia and Herzegovina)	Malek Jaziri; Mirza Bašić	5; 7	7; 5	6; 3
3	(Tunisia) (Bosnia and Herzegovina)	Moez Echargui / Malek Jaziri; Mirza Bašić / Tomislav Brkić	6; 1	4; 6	3; 6
4	(Tunisia) (Bosnia and Herzegovina)	Malek Jaziri; Damir Džumhur	7^{7} 6^{5}	3; 6	3; 6
5	(Tunisia) (Bosnia and Herzegovina)	Moez Echargui; Mirza Bašić				not played

=== Israel vs. South Africa ===
Israel
3
HaKiriya Arena, Ashdod, Israel
4–5 March 2022
Hard (i)

South Africa
1

			1	2	3
1	(Israel) (South Africa)	Daniel Cukierman; Lloyd Harris	4; 6	4; 6
2	(Israel) (South Africa)	Yshai Oliel; Ruan Roelofse	6; 2	6; 3
3	(Israel) (South Africa)	Daniel Cukierman / Jonathan Erlich; Lloyd Harris / Raven Klaasen	7^{7} 6^{3}	3; 6	6; 3
4	(Israel) (South Africa)	Yshai Oliel; Lloyd Harris	6; 3	6; 4
5	(Israel) (South Africa)	Daniel Cukierman; Ruan Roelofse				not played

=== New Zealand vs. Uruguay ===
New Zealand
3
Darling Tennis Center, Las Vegas, United States
4–5 March 2022
Hard

Uruguay
1

			1	2	3
1	(New Zealand) (Uruguay)	Rubin Statham; Ignacio Carou	6; 4	6; 2
2	(New Zealand) (Uruguay)	Ajeet Rai; Pablo Cuevas	4; 6	2; 6
3	(New Zealand) (Uruguay)	Artem Sitak / Michael Venus; Ariel Behar / Pablo Cuevas	6; 3	6; 4
4	(New Zealand) (Uruguay)	Rubin Statham; Pablo Cuevas	7^{7} 6^{3}	6; 2
5	(New Zealand) (Uruguay)	Ajeet Rai; Ignacio Carou				not played

=== Ukraine vs. Barbados ===
Ukraine
3
Rixos Premium Belek, Antalya, Turkey
4–5 March 2022
Hard

Barbados
0

			1	2	3
1	(Ukraine) (Barbados)	Oleksii Krutykh; Darian King	6; 2	6; 1
2	(Ukraine) (Barbados)	Illya Marchenko; Matthew Foster-Estwick	6; 3	6; 1
3	(Ukraine) (Barbados)	Oleksii Krutykh / Illya Marchenko; Matthew Foster-Estwick / Darian King	6; 4	7; 5
4	(Ukraine) (Barbados)	Illya Marchenko; Darian King				not played
5	(Ukraine) (Barbados)	Oleksii Krutykh; Matthew Foster-Estwick				not played

=== Pakistan vs. Lithuania ===
Pakistan
3
Pakistan Sports Complex, Islamabad, Pakistan
4–5 March 2022
Grass

Lithuania
2

			1	2	3
1	(Pakistan) (Lithuania)	Aqeel Khan; Laurynas Grigelis	7^{7} 6^{5}	3; 6	6; 3
2	(Pakistan) (Lithuania)	Muhammad Shoaib; Ričardas Berankis	4; 6	7^{7} 6^{2}	4; 6
3	(Pakistan) (Lithuania)	Aqeel Khan / Aisam-ul-Haq Qureshi; Ričardas Berankis / Laurynas Grigelis	4; 6	7^{7} 6^{4}	7; 5
4	(Pakistan) (Lithuania)	Aqeel Khan; Ričardas Berankis	6^{4} 7^{7}	7^{8} 6^{6}	4; 6
5	(Pakistan) (Lithuania)	Aisam-ul-Haq Qureshi; Edas Butvilas	6; 4	7^{7} 6^{2}

=== Peru vs. Bolivia ===
Peru
3
Club Lawn Tennis de La Exposición, Lima, Peru
4–5 March 2022
Clay

Bolivia
1

			1	2	3
1	(Peru) (Bolivia)	Juan Pablo Varillas; Murkel Dellien	6; 2	6; 2
2	(Peru) (Bolivia)	Conner Huertas del Pino; Hugo Dellien	1; 6	4; 6
3	(Peru) (Bolivia)	Sergio Galdós / Juan Pablo Varillas; Boris Arias / Federico Zeballos	3; 6	6; 3	7; 5
4	(Peru) (Bolivia)	Juan Pablo Varillas; Hugo Dellien	6; 4	4; 6	7^{10} 6^{8}
5	(Peru) (Bolivia)	Conner Huertas del Pino; Murkel Dellien				not played

=== Switzerland vs. Lebanon ===
Switzerland
3
Jan Group Arena, Biel/Bienne, Switzerland
4–5 March 2022
Hard (i)

Lebanon
1

			1	2	3
1	(Switzerland) (Lebanon)	Dominic Stricker; Benjamin Hassan	3; 6	3; 6
2	(Switzerland) (Lebanon)	Henri Laaksonen; Hady Habib	5; 7	6; 3	6; 3
3	(Switzerland) (Lebanon)	Marc-Andrea Hüsler / Dominic Stricker; Hady Habib / Benjamin Hassan	6; 4	7^{7} 6^{3}
4	(Switzerland) (Lebanon)	Henri Laaksonen; Benjamin Hassan	6; 4	7^{7} 6^{4}
5	(Switzerland) (Lebanon)	Dominic Stricker; Hady Habib				not played

=== Mexico vs. Belarus ===
Mexico
w/o
Estadio Rafael Osuna, Mexico City, Mexico
4–5 March 2022
Clay

Belarus

			1	2	3
1	(Mexico) (Belarus)	N/A; N/A				not played
2	(Mexico) (Belarus)	N/A; N/A				not played
3	(Mexico) (Belarus)	N/A / N/A; N/A / N/A				not played
4	(Mexico) (Belarus)	N/A; N/A				not played
5	(Mexico) (Belarus)	N/A; N/A				not played
