= 2017 Davis Cup Europe Zone Group III =

International tennis competition

The Europe Zone was one of the four zones within Group 3 of the regional Davis Cup competition in 2017. The zone's competition was held in round robin format in Sozopol, Bulgaria, in April 2017. The two winning groups advanced to Europe/Africa Zone Group II in 2018.

== Participating nations ==
- Albania
- Andorra
- Armenia
- Bulgaria
- Greece
- Iceland
- Ireland
- Kosovo
- Liechtenstein
- Luxembourg
- Macedonia
- Malta
- Moldova
- Montenegro
- San Marino

=== Inactive nation ===
- Azerbaijan

== Draw ==
Date: 5–8 April 2017

Location: Holiday Village Santa Marina, Sozopol, Bulgaria (hard)

Format: Round-robin basis. One pool of three teams (Pool A) and three pools of four teams (Pools B, C and D). The winners of each pool play-off against each other to determine which two nations are promoted to Europe/Africa Zone Group II in 2018.

Seeding: The seeding was based on the Davis Cup Rankings of 20 February 2017 (shown in parentheses below).

| Pot 1 | Pot 2 | Pot 3 |
|---|---|---|
| 1. Bulgaria (50); 2. Moldova (61); 3. Luxembourg (67); 4. Ireland (79) | 5. Macedonia (88); 6. Montenegro (92); 7. Greece (97); 8. Liechtenstein (102*) | 9. Malta (102*); 10. Andorra (113); 11. San Marino (114); 12. Iceland (116); 13. Armenia (119); 14. Albania (125); 15. Kosovo (128) |

* Tie broken by drawing of lot.

=== Pool A ===
| | | BUL | GRE | ARM | RR; W–L | Set; W–L | Game; W–L | Standings |
| 50 | Bulgaria | | 3–0 | 3–0 | 2–0 | 12–1 (92%) | 79–36 (69%) | 1 |
| 97 | Greece | 0–3 | | 3–0 | 1–1 | 7–7 (50%) | 64–53 (55%) | 2 |
| 119 | Armenia | 0–3 | 0–3 | | 0–2 | 1–12 (8%) | 23–77 (23%) | 3 |

=== Pool B ===
| | | MKD | MDA | MLT | ISL | RR; W–L | Set; W–L | Game; W–L | Standings |
| 88 | Macedonia | | 2–1 | 2–1 | 3–0 | 3–0 | 16–4 (80%) | 111–70 (61%) | 1 |
| 61 | Moldova | 1–2 | | 2–1 | 1–2 | 1–2 | 9–11 (45%) | 76–90 (46%) | 2 |
| 102 | Malta | 1–2 | 1–2 | | 2–1 | 1–2 | 8–12 (40%) | 77–94 (45%) | 3 |
| 116 | Iceland | 0–3 | 2–1 | 1–2 | | 1–2 | 7–13 (35%) | 77–87 (47%) | 4 |

=== Pool C ===
| | | LUX | LIE | ALB | SMR | RR; W–L | Set; W–L | Game; W–L | Standings |
| 67 | Luxembourg | | 3–0 | 3–0 | 3–0 | 3–0 | 18–1 (95%) | 115–41 (74%) | 1 |
| 102 | Liechtenstein | 0–3 | | 3–0 | 2–1 | 2–1 | 11–9 (55%) | 88–84 (51%) | 2 |
| 125 | Albania | 0–3 | 0–3 | | 2–1 | 1–2 | 3–16 (16%) | 59–106 (36%) | 3 |
| 114 | San Marino | 0–3 | 1–2 | 1–2 | | 0–3 | 7–15 (32%) | 86–117 (42%) | 4 |

=== Pool D ===
| | | IRL | MNE | AND | KOS | RR; W–L | Set; W–L | Game; W–L | Standings |
| 79 | Ireland | | 2–1 | 3–0 | 3–0 | 3–0 | 17–2 (89%) | 110–35 (76%) | 1 |
| 92 | Montenegro | 1–2 | | 2–1 | 3–0 | 2–1 | 12–5 (71%) | 90–71 (56%) | 2 |
| 113 | Andorra | 0–3 | 1–2 | | 3–0 | 1–2 | 8–11 (42%) | 75–86 (47%) | 3 |
| 128 | Kosovo | 0–3 | 0–3 | 0–3 | | 0–3 | 1–18 (5%) | 28–111 (20%) | 4 |

=== Playoffs ===
| Placing | A Team | Score | D Team |
|---|---|---|---|
| Promotional | Bulgaria | 1–2 | Ireland |
| 5th–8th | Greece | 1–2 | Montenegro |
| 9th–12th | Armenia | 2–1 | Andorra |
| 13th–15th | —N/a | | Kosovo |

| Placing | B Team | Score | C Team |
|---|---|---|---|
| Promotional | Macedonia | 1–2 | Luxembourg |
| 5th–8th | Moldova | 2–1 | Liechtenstein |
| 9th–12th | Malta | 2–1 | Albania |
| 13th–15th | Iceland | 2–0 | San Marino |

Ireland and Luxembourg promoted to Group II in 2018.

== Round robin ==
=== Pool A ===
==== Bulgaria vs. Armenia ====
Bulgaria
3
Holiday Village Santa Marina, Sozopol, Bulgaria
6 April 2017
Hard

Armenia
0

| | | | 1 | 2 | 3 |
|---|---|---|---|---|---|
| 1 | (Bulgaria) (Armenia) | Dimitar Kuzmanov; Mikayel Khachatryan | 6; 3 | 7^{7} 6^{0} |
| 2 | (Bulgaria) (Armenia) | Aleksandar Lazov; Mikayel Avetisyan | 6; 0 | 6; 0 |
| 3 | (Bulgaria) (Armenia) | Tihomir Grozdanov / Alexandar Lazarov; Mikayel Khachatryan / Sedrak Khachatryan | 6; 1 | 6; 2 |

==== Greece vs. Armenia ====
Greece
3
Holiday Village Santa Marina, Sozopol, Bulgaria
6–7 April 2017
Hard

Armenia
0

| | | | 1 | 2 | 3 |
|---|---|---|---|---|---|
| 1 | (Greece) (Armenia) | Charalampos Kapogiannis; Mikayel Khachatryan | 6; 0 | 6; 1 |
| 2 | (Greece) (Armenia) | Ioannis Stergiou; Mikayel Avetisyan | 6; 0 | 6; 0 |
| 3 | (Greece) (Armenia) | Stamatios Kapiris / Petros Tsitsipas; Mikayel Avetisyan / Sedrak Khachatryan | 4; 6 | 6; 3 | 6; 1 |

==== Bulgaria vs. Greece ====
Bulgaria
3
Holiday Village Santa Marina, Sozopol, Bulgaria
7 April 2017
Hard

Greece
0

| | | | 1 | 2 | 3 |
|---|---|---|---|---|---|
| 1 | (Bulgaria) (Greece) | Dimitar Kuzmanov; Charalampos Kapogiannis | 6^{6} 7^{8} | 6; 2 | 6; 4 |
| 2 | (Bulgaria) (Greece) | Aleksandar Lazov; Ioannis Stergiou | 6; 3 | 6; 4 |
| 3 | (Bulgaria) (Greece) | Tihomir Grozdanov / Alexandar Lazarov; Stamatios Kapiris / Petros Tsitsipas | 6; 0 | 6; 4 |

=== Pool B ===
==== Moldova vs. Iceland ====
Moldova
1
Holiday Village Santa Marina, Sozopol, Bulgaria
6 April 2017
Hard

Iceland
2

| | | | 1 | 2 | 3 |
|---|---|---|---|---|---|
| 1 | (Moldova) (Iceland) | Dmitrii Baskov; Rafn Kumar Bonifacius | 3; 6 | 3; 6 |
| 2 | (Moldova) (Iceland) | Andrei Șoltoianu; Birkir Gunnarsson | 6; 4 | 3; 6 | 6^{5} 7^{7} |
| 3 | (Moldova) (Iceland) | Dmitrii Baskov / Andrei Ciumac; Vladimir Ristic / Egill Sigurðsson | 6; 1 | 6; 3 |

==== Macedonia vs. Malta ====
North Macedonia
2
Holiday Village Santa Marina, Sozopol, Bulgaria
6–7 April 2017
Hard

Malta
1

| | | | 1 | 2 | 3 |
|---|---|---|---|---|---|
| 1 | (North Macedonia) (Malta) | Dimitar Grabul; Omar Sudzuka | 6; 3 | 6; 4 |
| 2 | (North Macedonia) (Malta) | Tomislav Jotovski; Matthew Asciak | 3; 6 | 6; 3 | 2; 6 |
| 3 | (North Macedonia) (Malta) | Shendrit Deari / Dimitar Grabul; Matthew Asciak / Omar Sudzuka | 7; 5 | 7; 5 |

==== Moldova vs. Malta ====
Moldova
2
Holiday Village Santa Marina, Sozopol, Bulgaria
7 April 2017
Hard

Malta
1

| | | | 1 | 2 | 3 |
|---|---|---|---|---|---|
| 1 | (Moldova) (Malta) | Andrei Șoltoianu; Matthew Asciak | 1; 6 | 1; 6 |
| 2 | (Moldova) (Malta) | Maxim Bulat; Denzil Agius | 6; 0 | 6; 4 |
| 3 | (Moldova) (Malta) | Dmitrii Baskov / Andrei Ciumac; Matthew Asciak / Omar Sudzuka | 6; 1 | 6; 1 |

==== Macedonia vs. Iceland ====
North Macedonia
3
Holiday Village Santa Marina, Sozopol, Bulgaria
7 April 2017
Hard

Iceland
0

| | | | 1 | 2 | 3 |
|---|---|---|---|---|---|
| 1 | (North Macedonia) (Iceland) | Dimitar Grabul; Rafn Kumar Bonifacius | 6; 4 | 6; 2 |
| 2 | (North Macedonia) (Iceland) | Tomislav Jotovski; Birkir Gunnarsson | 6; 0 | 6; 1 |
| 3 | (North Macedonia) (Iceland) | Shendrit Deari / Gorazd Srbljak; Vladimir Ristic / Egill Sigurðsson | 6; 4 | 6; 2 |

==== Moldova vs. Macedonia ====
Moldova
1
Holiday Village Santa Marina, Sozopol, Bulgaria
7–8 April 2017
Hard

North Macedonia
2

| | | | 1 | 2 | 3 |
|---|---|---|---|---|---|---|
| 1 | (Moldova) (North Macedonia) | Maxim Bulat; Dimitar Grabul | 1; 6 | 1; 6 |
| 2 | (Moldova) (North Macedonia) | Andrei Ciumac; Tomislav Jotovski | 3; 6 | 2; 6 |
| 3 | (Moldova) (North Macedonia) | Dmitrii Baskov / Andrei Șoltoianu; Shendrit Deari / Gorazd Srbljak | 5; 7 | 7^{7} 6^{4} | 4; 1 | retired |

==== Iceland vs. Malta ====
Iceland
1
Holiday Village Santa Marina, Sozopol, Bulgaria
7–8 April 2017
Hard

Malta
2

| | | | 1 | 2 | 3 |
|---|---|---|---|---|---|
| 1 | (Iceland) (Malta) | Rafn Kumar Bonifacius; Omar Sudzuka | 6; 1 | 6; 0 |
| 2 | (Iceland) (Malta) | Birkir Gunnarsson; Matthew Asciak | 1; 6 | 2; 6 |
| 3 | (Iceland) (Malta) | Rafn Kumar Bonifacius / Birkir Gunnarsson; Matthew Asciak / Omar Sudzuka | 6^{4} 7^{7} | 6; 2 | 4; 6 |

=== Pool C ===
==== Luxembourg vs. San Marino ====
Luxembourg
3
Holiday Village Santa Marina, Sozopol, Bulgaria
6 April 2017
Hard

San Marino
0

| | | | 1 | 2 | 3 |
|---|---|---|---|---|---|
| 1 | (Luxembourg) (San Marino) | Ugo Nastasi; Pietro Grassi | 6; 1 | 6; 1 |
| 2 | (Luxembourg) (San Marino) | Christophe Tholl; Marco de Rossi | 6; 2 | 7^{7} 6^{2} |
| 3 | (Luxembourg) (San Marino) | Tom Diederich / Ugo Nastasi; Marco de Rossi / Pietro Grassi | 5; 7 | 6; 3 | 6; 3 |

==== Liechtenstein vs. Albania ====
Liechtenstein
3
Holiday Village Santa Marina, Sozopol, Bulgaria
6 April 2017
Hard

Albania
0

| | | | 1 | 2 | 3 |
|---|---|---|---|---|---|
| 1 | (Liechtenstein) (Albania) | Timo Kranz; Arber Sulstarova | 6; 3 | 6; 2 |
| 2 | (Liechtenstein) (Albania) | Vital Flurin Leuch; Elbi Mjeshtri | 7^{7} 6^{5} | 6; 1 |
| 3 | (Liechtenstein) (Albania) | Robin Forster / Vital Flurin Leuch; Elbi Mjeshtri / Genajd Shypheja | 6; 3 | 6; 2 |

==== Luxembourg vs. Albania ====
Luxembourg
3
Holiday Village Santa Marina, Sozopol, Bulgaria
7 April 2017
Hard

Albania
0

| | | | 1 | 2 | 3 |
|---|---|---|---|---|---|
| 1 | (Luxembourg) (Albania) | Ugo Nastasi; Genajd Shypheja | 6; 0 | 6; 0 |
| 2 | (Luxembourg) (Albania) | Alex Knaff; Arber Sulstarova | 6; 2 | 6; 0 |
| 3 | (Luxembourg) (Albania) | Tom Diederich / Alex Knaff; Elbi Mjeshtri / Genajd Shypheja | 6; 4 | 6; 0 |

==== Liechtenstein vs. San Marino ====
Liechtenstein
2
Holiday Village Santa Marina, Sozopol, Bulgaria
7 April 2017
Hard

San Marino
1

| | | | 1 | 2 | 3 |
|---|---|---|---|---|---|
| 1 | (Liechtenstein) (San Marino) | Timo Kranz; Pietro Grassi | 6; 0 | 6; 1 |
| 2 | (Liechtenstein) (San Marino) | Vital Flurin Leuch; Marco de Rossi | 6; 4 | 2; 6 | 2; 6 |
| 3 | (Liechtenstein) (San Marino) | Robin Forster / Timo Kranz; Marco de Rossi / Pietro Grassi | 6; 1 | 4; 6 | 7^{12} 6^{10} |

==== Luxembourg vs. Liechtenstein ====
Luxembourg
3
Holiday Village Santa Marina, Sozopol, Bulgaria
7–8 April 2017
Hard

Liechtenstein
0

| | | | 1 | 2 | 3 |
|---|---|---|---|---|---|
| 1 | (Luxembourg) (Liechtenstein) | Ugo Nastasi; Timo Kranz | 6; 0 | 6; 0 |
| 2 | (Luxembourg) (Liechtenstein) | Christophe Tholl; Vital Flurin Leuch | 7^{7} 6^{5} | 6; 3 |
| 3 | (Luxembourg) (Liechtenstein) | Tom Diederich / Alex Knaff; Robin Forster / Serafin Zund | 6; 0 | 6; 3 |

==== San Marino vs. Albania ====
San Marino
1
Holiday Village Santa Marina, Sozopol, Bulgaria
7–8 April 2017
Hard

Albania
2

| | | | 1 | 2 | 3 |
|---|---|---|---|---|---|
| 1 | (San Marino) (Albania) | Antoine Barbieri; Mario Zili | 1; 6 | 5; 7 |
| 2 | (San Marino) (Albania) | Marco de Rossi; Elbi Mjeshtri | 6; 3 | 6; 3 |
| 3 | (San Marino) (Albania) | Antoine Barbieri / Pietro Grassi; Elbi Mjeshtri / Genajd Shypheja | 6; 4 | 3; 6 | 6^{4} 7^{7} |

=== Pool D ===
==== Ireland vs. Andorra ====
Ireland
3
Holiday Village Santa Marina, Sozopol, Bulgaria
6 April 2017
Hard

Andorra
0

| | | | 1 | 2 | 3 |
|---|---|---|---|---|---|
| 1 | (Republic of Ireland) (Andorra) | Sam Barry; Jean-Baptiste Poux-Gautier | 6; 2 | 6; 2 |
| 2 | (Republic of Ireland) (Andorra) | James McGee; Laurent Recouderc | 6; 0 | 6; 0 |
| 3 | (Republic of Ireland) (Andorra) | Sam Barry / David O'Hare; Èric Cervós Noguer / Laurent Recouderc | 6; 3 | 6; 0 |

==== Montenegro vs. Kosovo ====
Montenegro
3
Holiday Village Santa Marina, Sozopol, Bulgaria
6 April 2017
Hard

Kosovo
0

| | | | 1 | 2 | 3 |
|---|---|---|---|---|---|
| 1 | (Montenegro) (Kosovo) | Rrezart Cungu; Granit Bajraliu | 6; 1 | 6; 0 |
| 2 | (Montenegro) (Kosovo) | Ljubomir Čelebić; Hyda Banjska | 6; 1 | 6; 1 |
| 3 | (Montenegro) (Kosovo) | Mario Aleksić / Pavle Rogan; Burim Bytyqi / Meldin Mustafi | 6; 1 | 6; 0 |

==== Ireland vs. Kosovo ====
Ireland
3
Holiday Village Santa Marina, Sozopol, Bulgaria
6–7 April 2017
Hard

Kosovo
0

| | | | 1 | 2 | 3 |
|---|---|---|---|---|---|
| 1 | (Republic of Ireland) (Kosovo) | Peter Bothwell; Granit Bajraliu | 6; 0 | 6; 2 |
| 2 | (Republic of Ireland) (Kosovo) | James McGee; Hyda Banjska | 6; 0 | 6; 0 |
| 3 | (Republic of Ireland) (Kosovo) | Peter Bothwell / David O'Hare; Granit Bajraliu / Meldin Mustafi | 6; 2 | 6; 2 |

==== Montenegro vs. Andorra ====
Montenegro
2
Holiday Village Santa Marina, Sozopol, Bulgaria
6–7 April 2017
Hard

Andorra
1

| | | | 1 | 2 | 3 |
|---|---|---|---|---|---|
| 1 | (Montenegro) (Andorra) | Rrezart Cungu; Jean-Baptiste Poux-Gautier | 6; 4 | 6; 2 |
| 2 | (Montenegro) (Andorra) | Ljubomir Čelebić; Laurent Recouderc | 7^{7} 6^{3} | 6; 4 |
| 3 | (Montenegro) (Andorra) | Mario Aleksić / Pavle Rogan; Èric Cervós Noguer / Jean-Baptiste Poux-Gautier | 5; 7 | 2; 6 |

==== Ireland vs. Montenegro ====
Ireland
2
Holiday Village Santa Marina, Sozopol, Bulgaria
7–8 April 2017
Hard

Montenegro
1

| | | | 1 | 2 | 3 |
|---|---|---|---|---|---|
| 1 | (Republic of Ireland) (Montenegro) | Sam Barry; Rrezart Cungu | 6; 0 | 6; 1 |
| 2 | (Republic of Ireland) (Montenegro) | James McGee; Ljubomir Čelebić | 5; 7 | 6; 2 | 3; 6 |
| 3 | (Republic of Ireland) (Montenegro) | Sam Barry / David O'Hare; Ljubomir Čelebić / Rrezart Cungu | 6; 2 | 6; 4 |

==== Andorra vs. Kosovo ====
Andorra
3
Holiday Village Santa Marina, Sozopol, Bulgaria
7–8 April 2017
Hard

Kosovo
0

| | | | 1 | 2 | 3 |
|---|---|---|---|---|---|
| 1 | (Andorra) (Kosovo) | Jean-Baptiste Poux-Gautier; Burim Bytyqi | 6; 1 | 6; 3 |
| 2 | (Andorra) (Kosovo) | Laurent Recouderc; Granit Bajraliu | 6; 0 | 6; 1 |
| 3 | (Andorra) (Kosovo) | Èric Cervós Noguer / Laurent Recouderc; Granit Bajraliu / Hyda Banjska | 3; 6 | 6; 4 | 6; 3 |

== Playoffs ==
=== Promotional playoffs ===
==== Bulgaria vs. Ireland ====
Bulgaria
1
Holiday Village Santa Marina, Sozopol, Bulgaria
8 April 2017
Hard

Ireland
2

| | | | 1 | 2 | 3 |
|---|---|---|---|---|---|
| 1 | (Bulgaria) (Republic of Ireland) | Dimitar Kuzmanov; Sam Barry | 4; 6 | 6; 3 | 7^{8} 6^{6} |
| 2 | (Bulgaria) (Republic of Ireland) | Aleksandar Lazov; James McGee | 2; 6 | 6; 4 | 1; 6 |
| 3 | (Bulgaria) (Republic of Ireland) | Dimitar Kuzmanov / Aleksandar Lazov; Sam Barry / David O'Hare | 1; 6 | 6^{6} 7^{8} |

==== Macedonia vs. Luxembourg ====
North Macedonia
1
Holiday Village Santa Marina, Sozopol, Bulgaria
8 April 2017
Hard

Luxembourg
2

| | | | 1 | 2 | 3 |
|---|---|---|---|---|---|
| 1 | (North Macedonia) (Luxembourg) | Dimitar Grabul; Ugo Nastasi | 4; 6 | 3; 6 |
| 2 | (North Macedonia) (Luxembourg) | Tomislav Jotovski; Christophe Tholl | 6; 2 | 6; 2 |
| 3 | (North Macedonia) (Luxembourg) | Dimitar Grabul / Tomislav Jotovski; Alex Knaff / Ugo Nastasi | 5; 7 | 6; 4 | 2; 6 |

=== 5th to 8th place playoffs ===
==== Greece vs. Montenegro ====
Greece
1
Holiday Village Santa Marina, Sozopol, Bulgaria
8 April 2017
Hard

Montenegro
2

| | | | 1 | 2 | 3 |
|---|---|---|---|---|---|
| 1 | (Greece) (Montenegro) | Charalampos Kapogiannis; Pavle Rogan | 6; 4 | 6; 3 |
| 2 | (Greece) (Montenegro) | Ioannis Stergiou; Rrezart Cungu | 5; 7 | 0; 6 |
| 3 | (Greece) (Montenegro) | Charalampos Kapogiannis / Petros Tsitsipas; Ljubomir Čelebić / Rrezart Cungu | 5; 7 | 2; 6 |

==== Moldova vs. Liechtenstein ====
Moldova
2
Holiday Village Santa Marina, Sozopol, Bulgaria
8 April 2017
Hard

Liechtenstein
1

| | | | 1 | 2 | 3 |
|---|---|---|---|---|---|
| 1 | (Moldova) (Liechtenstein) | Dmitrii Baskov; Timo Kranz | 6; 4 | 6; 1 |
| 2 | (Moldova) (Liechtenstein) | Maxim Bulat; Vital Flurin Leuch | 6; 0 | 1; 6 | 2; 6 |
| 3 | (Moldova) (Liechtenstein) | Dmitrii Baskov / Andrei Șoltoianu; Robin Forster / Vital Flurin Leuch | 6; 3 | 3; 6 | 6; 2 |

=== 9th to 12th place playoffs ===
==== Armenia vs. Andorra ====
Armenia
2
Holiday Village Santa Marina, Sozopol, Bulgaria
8 April 2017
Hard

Andorra
1

| | | | 1 | 2 | 3 |
|---|---|---|---|---|---|
| 1 | (Armenia) (Andorra) | Mikayel Khachatryan; Èric Cervós Noguer | 6; 3 | 6; 1 |
| 2 | (Armenia) (Andorra) | Sedrak Khachatryan; Laurent Recouderc | 2; 6 | 0; 6 |
| 3 | (Armenia) (Andorra) | Mikayel Avetisyan / Mikayel Khachatryan; Jean-Baptiste Poux-Gautier / Laurent Recouderc | 6; 2 | 6; 3 |

==== Malta vs. Albania ====
Malta
2
Holiday Village Santa Marina, Sozopol, Bulgaria
8 April 2017
Hard

Albania
1

| | | | 1 | 2 | 3 |
|---|---|---|---|---|---|
| 1 | (Malta) (Albania) | Omar Sudzuka; Mario Zili | 6; 1 | 6; 1 |
| 2 | (Malta) (Albania) | Denzil Agius; Elbi Mjeshtri | 2; 6 | 3; 6 |
| 3 | (Malta) (Albania) | Matthew Asciak / Omar Sudzuka; Genajd Shypheja / Arber Sulstarova | 6; 0 | 6; 1 |

=== 13th to 14th playoff ===
==== Iceland vs. San Marino ====
Iceland
2
Holiday Village Santa Marina, Sozopol, Bulgaria
8 April 2017
Hard

San Marino
0

| | | | 1 | 2 | 3 |
|---|---|---|---|---|---|---|
| 1 | (Iceland) (San Marino) | Rafn Kumar Bonifacius; Pietro Grassi | 6; 0 | 6; 0 |
| 2 | (Iceland) (San Marino) | Birkir Gunnarsson; Marco de Rossi | 2; 1 | | | retired |
| 3 | (Iceland) (San Marino) | Rafn Kumar Bonifacius / Birkir Gunnarsson; Marco de Rossi / Pietro Grassi | | | | not played |
