= Dmitrii Baskov =

Moldovan tennis player (born 1994)

- Country (sports): Moldova
- Residence: Chișinău, Moldova
- Born: 19 December 1994 (age 31) Chișinău, Moldova
- Height: 185 cm (6 ft 1 in)
- Turned pro: 2013
- Plays: Right-handed (two-handed backhand)
- Prize money: $1,652

Singles
- Career record: 0–1 (at ATP Tour level, Grand Slam level, and in Davis Cup)
- Career titles: 0; 0 Challenger, 0 Futures
- Highest ranking: No. 1,702 (27 October 2014)

Doubles
- Career record: 0–1 (in ATP Tour level, Grand Slam level, and in Davis Cup)
- Career titles: 0; 0 Challenger, 0 Futures
- Highest ranking: No. 1,372 (30 December 2019)
- Current ranking: No. 1,372 (30 December 2019)

Team competitions
- Davis Cup: 5–3
- Last updated on: 30 December 2019.

Dmitrii Baskov (born 19 December 1994) is a Moldovan tennis player.

Baskov has a career high ATP singles ranking of 1,702 achieved on 27 October 2014. He also has a career high ATP doubles ranking of 1,372 achieved on 30 December 2019.

In January 2020, he participated at the ATP Cup as a member of the Moldovan team.

Baskov represents Moldova at the Davis Cup, where he has a W/L record of 5–3.

== Davis Cup ==
=== Participations: (5–3) ===
Group membership World Group (0–0) WG Play-off (0–0) Group I (0–0) Group II (0–2) Group III (5–1) Group IV (0–0)	Matches by surface Hard (5–3) Clay (0–0) Grass (0–0) Carpet (0–0)	Matches by type Singles (1–2) Doubles (4–1)

- ▲ ▼ indicates the outcome of the Davis Cup match followed by the score, date, place of event, the zonal classification and its phase, and the court surface.

Rubber outcome	No.	Rubber	Match type (partner if any)	Opponent nation	Opponent player(s)	Score
▼0–5; 17-19 July 2015; Harare Sports Club Harare, Zimbabwe; Europe/Africa Zone Group II Relegation Playoff; Hard surface
Defeat	1	II	Singles	Zimbabwe	Benjamin Lock	2–6, 0–6, 2–6
Defeat	2	III	Doubles (with Andrei Șoltoianu)	Zimbabwe	Mark Fynn / Courtney John Lock	5–7, 7–5, 6–7^{(6–8)}, 3–6
▼1–2; 6 April 2017; Holiday Village Santa Marina, Sozopol, Bulgaria; Europe Zone Group III Round robin; Hard surface
Defeat	3	I	Singles	Iceland	Rafn Kumar Bonifacius	3–6, 3–6
Victory	4	III	Doubles (with Andrei Ciumac) (dead rubber)	Iceland	Vladimir Ristic / Egill Sigurðsson	6–1, 6–3
▲2–1; 7 April 2017; Holiday Village Santa Marina, Sozopol, Bulgaria; Europe Zone Group III Round robin; Hard surface
Victory	5	III	Doubles (with Andrei Ciumac)	Malta	Matthew Asciak / Omar Sudzuka	6–1, 6–1
▼1–2; 7-8 April 2017; Holiday Village Santa Marina, Sozopol, Bulgaria; Europe Zone Group III Round robin; Hard surface
Victory	6	III	Doubles (with Andrei Șoltoianu) (dead rubber)	(North Macedonia) Macedonia	Shendrit Deari / Gorazd Srbljak	5–7, 7–6^{(7–4)}, 4–1 ret.
▲2–1; 8 April 2017; Holiday Village Santa Marina, Sozopol, Bulgaria; Europe Zone Group III 5th-8th place Playoff; Hard surface
Victory	7	I	Singles	Liechtenstein	Timo Kranz	6–4, 6–1
Victory	8	III	Doubles (with Andrei Șoltoianu)	Liechtenstein	Robin Forster / Vital Flurin Leuch	6–3, 3–6, 6–2
