= 2021 Davis Cup Europe Zone Group III =

Davis Cup competition in 2021

The Europe Zone was the unique zone within Group 3 of the regional Davis Cup competition in 2021. The zone's competition was held in round robin format in Larnaca, Cyprus, from 16 to 19 June 2021.

== Participating nations ==
- Cyprus
- Georgia
- Iceland
- Ireland
- Luxembourg
- Malta
- Monaco

=== Withdrawn nations ===
- Liechtenstein

== Draw ==
Date: 16–19 June 2021.

Location: Herodotou Tennis Academy, Larnaca, Cyprus (hard).

Format: Round-robin basis. Two pools – one of four teams and one of three teams – and nations will play each team once in their group. The two group winners will automatically earn promotion to the World Group II play-offs in 2022.

The two second-placed teams will fight for the third remaining promotion spot. The two teams finishing in third place will fight to avoid relegation to Europe Group IV and the team finishing fourth place in the pool of four teams will automatically be relegated.

=== Seeding ===
| Pot | Nation | Rank^{1} | Seed |
|---|---|---|---|
| 1 | Georgia | 74 | 1 |
| 1 | Monaco | 82 | 2 |
| 2 | Luxembourg | 84 | 3 |
| 2 | Cyprus | 92 | 4 |
| 3 | Ireland | 98 | 5 |
| 3 | Iceland | 102 | 6 |
| 3 | Malta | 102 | 7 |

- ^{1}Davis Cup Rankings as of 8 March 2021

=== Round Robin ===
==== Pool A ====
| | | CYP | GEO | ISL | RR; W–L | Set; W–L | Game; W–L | Standings |
| 4 | Cyprus | | 3–0 | 3–0 | 6–0 | 12–1 (92%) | 79–41 (66%) | 1 |
| 1 | Georgia | 0–3 | | 3–0 | 3–3 | 7–6 (54%) | 57–54 (51%) | 2 |
| 6 | Iceland | 0–3 | 0–3 | | 0–6 | 0–12 (0%) | 34–75 (31%) | 3 |

==== Pool B ====
| | | MON | IRL | LUX | MLT | RR; W–L | Set; W–L | Game; W–L | Standings |
| 2 | Monaco | | 2–1 | 2–1 | 3–0 | 7–2 | 15–4 (79%) | 102–55 (65%) | 1 |
| 5 | Ireland | 1–2 | | 2–1 | 3–0 | 6–3 | 13–6 (68%) | 94–70 (57%) | 2 |
| 3 | Luxembourg | 1–2 | 1–2 | | 3–0 | 5–4 | 10–10 (50%) | 89–79 (53%) | 3 |
| 7 | Malta | 0–3 | 0–3 | 0–3 | | 0–9 | 0–18 (0%) | 27–108 (20%) | 4 |

Standings are determined by: 1. number of wins; 2. number of matches; 3. in two-team ties, head-to-head records; 4. in three-team ties, (a) percentage of sets won (head-to-head records if two teams remain tied), then (b) percentage of games won (head-to-head records if two teams remain tied), then (c) Davis Cup rankings.

=== Playoffs ===
| Placing | A Team | Score | B Team |
|---|---|---|---|
| 1st–2nd | Cyprus | 1–2 | Monaco |
| 3rd–4th | Georgia | 1–2 | Ireland |
| 5th–6th | Iceland | 0–2 | Luxembourg |
| 7th | —N/a | | Malta |

== Round Robin ==
=== Pool A ===
==== Georgia vs. Iceland ====
Georgia
3
Herodotou Tennis Academy, Larnaca, Cyprus
16 June 2021
Hard

Iceland
0

| | | | 1 | 2 | 3 |
|---|---|---|---|---|---|
| 1 | (Georgia (country)) (Iceland) | Aleksandre Bakshi; Daniel Siddall | 6; 2 | 6; 2 |
| 2 | (Georgia (country)) (Iceland) | Aleksandre Metreveli; Egill Sigurðsson | 6; 0 | 6; 3 |
| 3 | (Georgia (country)) (Iceland) | Saba Purtseladze / Zura Tkemaladze; Anton Magnússon / Daniel Siddall | 6; 3 | 6; 4 |

==== Cyprus vs. Iceland ====
Cyprus
3
Herodotou Tennis Academy, Larnaca, Cyprus
17 June 2021
Hard

Iceland
0

| | | | 1 | 2 | 3 |
|---|---|---|---|---|---|
| 1 | (Cyprus) (Iceland) | Menelaos Efstathiou; Anton Magnússon | 7^{7} 6^{3} | 6; 3 |
| 2 | (Cyprus) (Iceland) | Petros Chrysochos; Egill Sigurðsson | 6; 1 | 6; 0 |
| 3 | (Cyprus) (Iceland) | Sergis Kyratzis / Eleftherios Neos; Daniel Siddall / Egill Sigurðsson | 7; 5 | 7; 5 |

==== Georgia vs. Cyprus ====
Georgia
0
Herodotou Tennis Academy, Larnaca, Cyprus
18 June 2021
Hard

Cyprus
3

| | | | 1 | 2 | 3 |
|---|---|---|---|---|---|
| 1 | (Georgia (country)) (Cyprus) | Aleksandre Bakshi; Menelaos Efstathiou | 3; 6 | 3; 6 |
| 2 | (Georgia (country)) (Cyprus) | Aleksandre Metreveli; Petros Chrysochos | 2; 6 | 2; 6 |
| 3 | (Georgia (country)) (Cyprus) | Saba Purtseladze / Zura Tkemaladze; Sergis Kyratzis / Eleftherios Neos | 6; 4 | 3; 6 | 2; 6 |

=== Pool B ===
==== Monaco vs. Malta ====
Monaco
3
Herodotou Tennis Academy, Larnaca, Cyprus
16 June 2021
Hard

Malta
0

| | | | 1 | 2 | 3 |
|---|---|---|---|---|---|
| 1 | (Monaco) (Malta) | Valentin Vacherot; Matthew Cassar Torregiani | 6; 0 | 6; 0 |
| 2 | (Monaco) (Malta) | Lucas Catarina; Liam Delicata | 6; 0 | 6; 1 |
| 3 | (Monaco) (Malta) | Romain Arneodo / Hugo Nys; Matthew Cassar Torregiani / Alex Degabriele | 6; 1 | 6; 1 |

==== Luxembourg vs. Ireland ====
Luxembourg
1
Herodotou Tennis Academy, Larnaca, Cyprus
16 June 2021
Hard

Ireland
2

| | | | 1 | 2 | 3 |
|---|---|---|---|---|---|
| 1 | (Luxembourg) (Republic of Ireland) | Chris Rodesch; Osgar O'Hoisin | 3; 6 | 6; 0 | 6; 2 |
| 2 | (Luxembourg) (Republic of Ireland) | Alex Knaff; Simon Carr | 3; 6 | 2; 6 |
| 3 | (Luxembourg) (Republic of Ireland) | Raphaël Calzi / Alex Knaff; Simon Carr / David O'Hare | 3; 6 | 4; 6 |

==== Monaco vs. Ireland ====
Monaco
2
Herodotou Tennis Academy, Larnaca, Cyprus
17 June 2021
Hard

Ireland
1

| | | | 1 | 2 | 3 |
|---|---|---|---|---|---|
| 1 | (Monaco) (Republic of Ireland) | Valentin Vacherot; Osgar O'Hoisin | 6; 3 | 6; 4 |
| 2 | (Monaco) (Republic of Ireland) | Lucas Catarina; Simon Carr | 4; 6 | 4; 6 |
| 3 | (Monaco) (Republic of Ireland) | Romain Arneodo / Hugo Nys; Simon Carr / David O'Hare | 6; 3 | 6; 4 |

==== Luxembourg vs. Malta ====
Luxembourg
3
Herodotou Tennis Academy, Larnaca, Cyprus
17 June 2021
Hard

Malta
0

| | | | 1 | 2 | 3 |
|---|---|---|---|---|---|
| 1 | (Luxembourg) (Malta) | Chris Rodesch; Alex Degabriele | 6; 2 | 6; 2 |
| 2 | (Luxembourg) (Malta) | Raphaël Calzi; Liam Delicata | 6; 3 | 6; 4 |
| 3 | (Luxembourg) (Malta) | Raphaël Calzi / Alex Knaff; Alex Degabriele / Liam Delicata | 6; 1 | 6; 1 |

==== Monaco vs. Luxembourg ====
Monaco
2
Herodotou Tennis Academy, Larnaca, Cyprus
18 June 2021
Hard

Luxembourg
1

| | | | 1 | 2 | 3 |
|---|---|---|---|---|---|
| 1 | (Monaco) (Luxembourg) | Romain Arneodo; Chris Rodesch | 2; 6 | 7; 5 | 1; 6 |
| 2 | (Monaco) (Luxembourg) | Valentin Vacherot; Alex Knaff | 6; 2 | 6; 3 |
| 3 | (Monaco) (Luxembourg) | Romain Arneodo / Hugo Nys; Raphaël Calzi / Alex Knaff | 6; 4 | 6; 0 |

==== Ireland vs. Malta ====
Ireland
3
Herodotou Tennis Academy, Larnaca, Cyprus
18 June 2021
Hard

Malta
0

| | | | 1 | 2 | 3 |
|---|---|---|---|---|---|
| 1 | (Republic of Ireland) (Malta) | Ammar Elamin; Alex Degabriele | 6; 1 | 6; 2 |
| 2 | (Republic of Ireland) (Malta) | Osgar O'Hoisin; Liam Delicata | 6; 4 | 6; 2 |
| 3 | (Republic of Ireland) (Malta) | David O'Hare / Osgar O'Hoisin; Matthew Cassar Torregiani / Liam Delicata | 6; 1 | 6; 1 |

== Play-offs ==
=== Promotional play-offs ===
==== Cyprus vs. Monaco ====
Cyprus
1
Herodotou Tennis Academy, Larnaca, Cyprus
19 June 2021
Hard

Monaco
2

| | | | 1 | 2 | 3 |
|---|---|---|---|---|---|
| 1 | (Cyprus) (Monaco) | Menelaos Efstathiou; Valentin Vacherot | 3; 6 | 6^{3} 7^{7} |
| 2 | (Cyprus) (Monaco) | Petros Chrysochos; Lucas Catarina | 4; 6 | 6; 3 | 6; 3 |
| 3 | (Cyprus) (Monaco) | Sergis Kyratzis / Eleftherios Neos; Romain Arneodo / Hugo Nys | 2; 6 | 4; 6 |

==== Georgia vs. Ireland ====
Georgia
1
Herodotou Tennis Academy, Larnaca, Cyprus
19 June 2021
Hard

Ireland
2

| | | | 1 | 2 | 3 |
|---|---|---|---|---|---|
| 1 | (Georgia (country)) (Republic of Ireland) | Aleksandre Bakshi; Osgar O'Hoisin | 6; 4 | 6; 3 |
| 2 | (Georgia (country)) (Republic of Ireland) | Aleksandre Metreveli; Simon Carr | 2; 6 | 2; 6 |
| 3 | (Georgia (country)) (Republic of Ireland) | Aleksandre Metreveli / Zura Tkemaladze; Simon Carr / David O'Hare | 3; 6 | 1; 6 |

=== Relegation play-offs ===
==== Iceland vs. Luxembourg ====
Iceland
0
Herodotou Tennis Academy, Larnaca, Cyprus
19 June 2021
Hard

Luxembourg
2

| | | | 1 | 2 | 3 |
|---|---|---|---|---|---|---|
| 1 | (Iceland) (Luxembourg) | Anton Magnússon; Chris Rodesch | 4; 6 | 4; 6 |
| 2 | (Iceland) (Luxembourg) | Egill Sigurðsson; Raphaël Calzi | 4; 6 | 0; 6 |
| 3 | (Iceland) (Luxembourg) | Daniel Siddall / Egill Sigurðsson; Raphaël Calzi / Chris Rodesch | | | | not played |

== Final placements ==
| Placing | Teams |
| Promoted/First | Monaco |
| Promoted/Second | Cyprus |
| Promoted/Third | Ireland |
| Fourth | Georgia |
| Fifth | Luxembourg |
| Relegated/Sixth | Iceland |
| Relegated/Seventh | Malta |

- Cyprus, Ireland and Monaco were promoted to 2022 Davis Cup World Group II Play-offs.
- Iceland and Malta were relegated to 2022 Davis Cup Europe Zone Group IV.
