= 2025 Davis Cup World Group II play-offs =

Tennis tournament

The 2025 Davis Cup World Group II play-offs will be held from 31 January to 2 February 2025. The thirteen winners of this round will qualify for the 2025 Davis Cup World Group II while the thirteen losers will play at the Group III of the corresponding continental zone.

== Teams ==
Twenty-six teams will play for thirteen spots in the World Group II, in series decided on a home and away basis.

These twenty-six teams are:

- 10 lowest-ranked losing teams from 2024 World Group II
- 12 teams from their Group III zone:
  - 3 from Europe
  - 3 from Asia/Oceania,
  - 3 from Americas, and
  - 3 from Africa
- 4 highest-ranked non-promoted team in each 2024 Regional Group III event.

The 13 winning teams from the play-offs will qualify for the World Group II and the 13 losing teams will play at the Group III of the corresponding continental zone.

#: Nations Ranking as of 18 September 2024.

Seeded teams

1. Latvia (=#46)
2. New Zealand (=#46)
3. Ireland (#52)
4. Morocco (=#54)
5. South Africa (#57)
6. El Salvador (#58)
7. Hong Kong (#59)
8. Estonia (#60)
9. Bolivia (#62)
10. Slovenia (#63)
11. China (#64)
12. Paraguay (#65)
13. Thailand (#66)

Unseeded teams

- Dominican Republic (#67)
- Indonesia (#68)
- Cyprus (#69)
- Jamaica (#70)
- Zimbabwe (#71)
- Namibia (#72)
- Venezuela (#74)
- Saudi Arabia (#75)
- Syria (#79)
- Moldova (#80)
- Nigeria (#82)
- Benin (=#85)
- Montenegro (#92)

== Results summary ==
| Home team | Score | Away team | Location | Venue | Surface |
|---|---|---|---|---|---|
| Benin | 3–2 | Latvia [1] | Cotonou | Sofitel Marina Hotel | Hard |
| Jamaica | 2–3 | New Zealand [2] | Kingston | Eric Bell National Tennis Centre | Hard |
| Saudi Arabia | 0–5 | Ireland [3] | Riyadh | Net Tennis Academy | Hard |
| Zimbabwe | 0–4 | Morocco [4] | Harare | Harare Sports Club | Hard |
| South Africa [5] | 3–1 | Nigeria | Pretoria | Groenkloof Tennis Club | Hard |
| El Salvador [6] | 3–2 | Moldova | Santa Tecla | Cancha Estadio Rafael Arévalo | Hard |
| Namibia | 2–3 | Hong Kong [7] | Windhoek | Central Tennis Club | Hard |
| Estonia [8] | 4–0 | Venezuela | Tallinn | Forus Tennisecenter Tondi | Hard (i) |
| Dominican Republic | 3–1 | Bolivia [9] | Santo Domingo | Centro Nacional de Tenis Parque del Este | Hard |
| Slovenia [10] | 4–0 | Indonesia | Velenje | Bela dvorana Velenje | Clay (i) |
| China [11] | 4–0 | Montenegro | Zhuhai | Hengqin International Tennis Center | Hard |
| Paraguay [12] | w/o | Syria | Asunción | Club Internacional de Tenis | Clay |
| Cyprus | 4–0 | Thailand [13] | Nicosia | Nicosia Field Club | Clay |

== Results ==
=== Benin vs. Latvia ===
Benin
3
Sofitel Marina Hotel, Cotonou, Benin
1–2 February 2025
Hard

Latvia
2

| | | | 1 | 2 | 3 |
|---|---|---|---|---|---|
| 1 | (Benin) (Latvia) | Alexis Klégou; Robert Strombachs | 5; 7 | 6; 4 | 3; 6 |
| 2 | (Benin) (Latvia) | Patrick Agbo-Panzo; Daniels Tens | 6; 3 | 6; 2 |
| 3 | (Benin) (Latvia) | Prince Gandonou / Alexis Klégou; Aleksandrs Sotikovs / Robert Strombachs | 6; 3 | 6; 3 |
| 4 | (Benin) (Latvia) | Patrick Agbo-Panzo; Robert Strombachs | 1; 6 | 1; 6 |
| 5 | (Benin) (Latvia) | Sylvestre Monnou; Daniels Tens | 6; 3 | 6; 3 |

=== Jamaica vs. New Zealand ===
Jamaica
2
Eric Bell National Tennis Centre, Kingston, Jamaica
1–2 February 2025
Hard

New Zealand
3

| | | | 1 | 2 | 3 |
|---|---|---|---|---|---|
| 1 | (Jamaica) (New Zealand) | Blaise Bicknell; Jack Loutit | 6; 3 | 2; 6 | 1; 6 |
| 2 | (Jamaica) (New Zealand) | Rowland Phillips; Kiranpal Pannu | 6; 3 | 3; 6 | 6; 3 |
| 3 | (Jamaica) (New Zealand) | John Chin / Nicholas Gore; Ajeet Rai / Finn Reynolds | 1; 6 | 2; 6 |
| 4 | (Jamaica) (New Zealand) | Blaise Bicknell; Ajeet Rai | 6; 3 | 6; 4 |
| 5 | (Jamaica) (New Zealand) | Rowland Phillips; Jack Loutit | 6; 3 | 3; 6 | 3; 6 |

=== Saudi Arabia vs. Ireland ===
Saudi Arabia
0
Net Tennis Academy, Riyadh, Saudi Arabia
31 January–1 February 2025
Hard

Ireland
5

| | | | 1 | 2 | 3 |
|---|---|---|---|---|---|
| 1 | (Saudi Arabia) (Republic of Ireland) | Saud Alhogbani; Michael Agwi | 4; 6 | 0; 6 |
| 2 | (Saudi Arabia) (Republic of Ireland) | Ammar Al-Haqbani; Osgar O'Hoisin | 4; 6 | 4; 6 |
| 3 | (Saudi Arabia) (Republic of Ireland) | Ammar Al-Haqbani / Saud Alhogbani; David O'Hare / Osgar O'Hoisin | 3; 6 | 7^{8} 6^{6} | 3; 6 |
| 4 | (Saudi Arabia) (Republic of Ireland) | Abdulmajeed Bukhari; Ammar Elamin | 1; 6 | 4; 6 |
| 5 | (Saudi Arabia) (Republic of Ireland) | Abdulmalek Bursais; Freddy Murray | 0; 6 | 2; 6 |

=== Zimbabwe vs. Morocco ===
Zimbabwe
0
Harare Sports Club, Harare, Zimbabwe
31 January–1 February 2025
Hard

Morocco
4

| | | | 1 | 2 | 3 |
|---|---|---|---|---|---|---|
| 1 | (Zimbabwe) (Morocco) | Courtney John Lock; Taha Baadi | 2; 6 | 4; 6 |
| 2 | (Zimbabwe) (Morocco) | Ethan Denzel Sibanda; Elliot Benchetrit | 2; 6 | 3; 6 |
| 3 | (Zimbabwe) (Morocco) | Courtney John Lock / Ronan Tashinga Mtisi; Elliot Benchetrit / Younes Lalami Laaroussi | 1; 6 | 1; 6 |
| 4 | (Zimbabwe) (Morocco) | Ronan Tashinga Mtisi; Karim Bennani | 4; 6 | 3; 6 |
| 5 | (Zimbabwe) (Morocco) | Ethan Denzel Sibanda; Taha Baadi | | | | not played |

=== South Africa vs. Nigeria ===
South Africa
3
Groenkloof Tennis Club, Pretoria, South Africa
1–2 February 2025
Hard

Nigeria
1

| | | | 1 | 2 | 3 |
|---|---|---|---|---|---|---|
| 1 | (South Africa) (Nigeria) | Philip Henning; David Ekpenyong | 6; 1 | 6; 1 |
| 2 | (South Africa) (Nigeria) | Kris van Wyk; Christopher Bulus | 6; 3 | 3; 6 | 6^{4} 7^{7} |
| 3 | (South Africa) (Nigeria) | Alec Beckley / Philip Henning; Canice Abua / Michael Emmanuel | 6; 0 | 6; 3 |
| 4 | (South Africa) (Nigeria) | Philip Henning; Christopher Bulus | 6^{4} 7^{7} | 6; 4 | 6; 4 |
| 5 | (South Africa) (Nigeria) | Kris van Wyk; David Ekpenyong | | | | not played |

=== El Salvador vs. Moldova ===
El Salvador
3
Cancha Estadio Rafael Arévalo, Santa Tecla, El Salvador
1–2 February 2025
Hard

Moldova
2

| | | | 1 | 2 | 3 |
|---|---|---|---|---|---|
| 1 | (El Salvador) (Moldova) | Marcelo Arévalo; Ilya Snițari | 6; 1 | 1; 6 | 4; 6 |
| 2 | (El Salvador) (Moldova) | César Cruz; Andrei Gorban | 6; 4 | 6; 1 |
| 3 | (El Salvador) (Moldova) | Marcelo Arévalo / César Cruz; Ilie Babinciuc / Ilya Snițari | 6; 0 | 6; 2 |
| 4 | (El Salvador) (Moldova) | César Cruz; Ilya Snițari | 1; 6 | 4; 6 |
| 5 | (El Salvador) (Moldova) | Marcelo Arévalo; Ilie Cazac | 6; 1 | 6; 0 |

=== Namibia vs. Hong Kong ===
Namibia
2
Central Tennis Club, Windhoek, Namibia
1–2 February 2025
Hard

Hong Kong
3

| | | | 1 | 2 | 3 |
|---|---|---|---|---|---|
| 1 | (Namibia) (Hong Kong) | Connor van Schalkwyk; Wong Chun-hun | 4; 6 | 6; 4 | 6; 1 |
| 2 | (Namibia) (Hong Kong) | Codie van Schalkwyk; Coleman Wong | 5; 7 | 5; 7 |
| 3 | (Namibia) (Hong Kong) | Jean Erasmus / Connor van Schalkwyk; Wong Chun-hun / Coleman Wong | 6^{6} 7^{8} | 5; 7 |
| 4 | (Namibia) (Hong Kong) | Connor van Schalkwyk; Coleman Wong | 6^{2} 7^{7} | 6^{8} 7^{10} |
| 5 | (Namibia) (Hong Kong) | Codie van Schalkwyk; Wong Tsz-fu | 7^{7} 6^{2} | 6; 4 |

=== Estonia vs. Venezuela ===
Estonia
4
Forus Tennisecenter Tondi, Tallinn, Estonia
31 January–1 February 2025
Hard (i)

Venezuela
0

| | | | 1 | 2 | 3 |
|---|---|---|---|---|---|---|
| 1 | (Estonia) (Venezuela) | Oliver Ojakäär; Ignacio Parisca | 6; 7 | 6; 4 | 6; 4 |
| 2 | (Estonia) (Venezuela) | Mark Lajal; Ricardo Rodríguez | 6; 1 | 6; 0 |
| 3 | (Estonia) (Venezuela) | Mark Lajal / Johannes Seeman; Juan José Bianchi / Brandon Pérez | 7; 5 | 7^{8} 6^{6} |
| 4 | (Estonia) (Venezuela) | Markus Mölder; Ignacio Parisca | 6; 3 | 6; 2 |
| 5 | (Estonia) (Venezuela) | Oliver Ojakäär; Ricardo Rodríguez | | | | not played |

=== Dominican Republic vs. Bolivia ===
Dominican Republic
3
Centro Nacional de Tenis Parque del Este, Santo Domingo, Dominican Republic
1–2 February 2025
Hard

Bolivia
1

| | | | 1 | 2 | 3 |
|---|---|---|---|---|---|---|
| 1 | (Dominican Republic) (Bolivia) | Peter Bertran; Federico Zeballos | 2; 6 | 7^{7} 6^{4} | 6; 4 |
| 2 | (Dominican Republic) (Bolivia) | Roberto Cid Subervi; Raúl García | 6; 3 | 6; 3 |
| 3 | (Dominican Republic) (Bolivia) | Peter Bertran / Alejandro José Gandini; Boris Arias / Federico Zeballos | 4; 6 | 4; 6 |
| 4 | (Dominican Republic) (Bolivia) | Roberto Cid Subervi; Federico Zeballos | 7^{7} 6^{2} | 6; 3 |
| 5 | (Dominican Republic) (Bolivia) | Peter Bertran; Raúl García | | | | not played |

=== Slovenia vs. Indonesia ===
Slovenia
4
Bela dvorana Velenje, Velenje, Slovenia
1–2 February 2025
Clay (i)

Indonesia
0

| | | | 1 | 2 | 3 |
|---|---|---|---|---|---|---|
| 1 | (Slovenia) (Indonesia) | Filip Jeff Planinšek; Muhammad Rifqi Fitriadi | 6; 1 | 6; 3 |
| 2 | (Slovenia) (Indonesia) | Bor Artnak; Gunawan Trismuwantara | 6; 2 | 6; 1 |
| 3 | (Slovenia) (Indonesia) | Sebastian Dominko / Jan Kupčič; Muhammad Rifqi Fitriadi / Christopher Rungkat | 6; 1 | 6; 4 |
| 4 | (Slovenia) (Indonesia) | Bor Artnak; Lucky Candra Kurniawan | 6; 1 | 6; 4 |
| 5 | (Slovenia) (Indonesia) | Filip Jeff Planinšek; Gunawan Trismuwantara | | | | not played |

=== China vs. Montenegro ===
China
4
Hengqin International Tennis Center, Zhuhai, China
31 January–1 February 2025
Hard

Montenegro
0

| | | | 1 | 2 | 3 |
|---|---|---|---|---|---|---|
| 1 | (China) (Montenegro) | Cui Jie; Petar Jovanović | 6; 4 | 7^{7} 6^{4} |
| 2 | (China) (Montenegro) | Zhang Zhizhen; Aleksa Krivokapić | 6; 4 | 6; 4 |
| 3 | (China) (Montenegro) | Sun Fajing / Te Rigele; Petar Jovanović / Aleksa Krivokapić | 6; 4 | 7^{7} 6^{1} |
| 4 | (China) (Montenegro) | Sun Fajing; Petar Jovanović | 6; 3 | 7; 5 |
| 5 | (China) (Montenegro) | Cui Jie; Aleksa Krivokapić | | | | not played |

=== Paraguay vs. Syria ===
Paraguay
Walkover
Club Internacional de Tenis, Asunción, Paraguay
31 January–1 February 2025
Clay

Syria

| | | 1 | 2 | 3 |
|---|---|---|---|---|
| 1 | (Paraguay) (Syria) |
| 2 | (Paraguay) (Syria) |
| 3 | (Paraguay) (Syria) |
| 4 | (Paraguay) (Syria) |
| 5 | (Paraguay) (Syria) |

=== Cyprus vs. Thailand ===
Cyprus
4
Nicosia Field Club, Nicosia, Cyprus
31 January–1 February 2025
Clay

Thailand
0

| | | | 1 | 2 | 3 |
|---|---|---|---|---|---|---|
| 1 | (Cyprus) (Thailand) | Menelaos Efstathiou; Maximus Jones | 2; 6 | 6; 3 | 6; 2 |
| 2 | (Cyprus) (Thailand) | Stylianos Christodoulou; Kasidit Samrej | 1; 6 | 6; 0 | 6; 4 |
| 3 | (Cyprus) (Thailand) | Sergis Kyratzis / Eleftherios Neos; Pruchya Isaro / Kasidit Samrej | 6; 3 | 7; 5 |
| 4 | (Cyprus) (Thailand) | Andreas Timini; Thanapet Chanta | 6; 3 | 6; 3 |
| 5 | (Cyprus) (Thailand) | Stylianos Christodoulou; Maximus Jones | | | | not played |
