= Alexandar Lazarov =

Bulgarian tennis player

- Country (sports): Bulgaria
- Born: 6 November 1997 (age 28) Miami, Florida, United States
- Height: 1.91 m (6 ft 3 in)
- Turned pro: 2016
- Retired: May 2024 (last match played)
- Plays: Right-handed (one-handed backhand)
- Coach: Krasimir Lazarov
- Prize money: US$191,201

Singles
- Career record: 7–9 (at ATP Tour level, Grand Slam level, and in Davis Cup)
- Career titles: 0
- Highest ranking: No. 272 (14 November 2022)

Doubles
- Career record: 4–9 (at ATP Tour level, Grand Slam level, and in Davis Cup)
- Career titles: 0
- Highest ranking: No. 359 (3 February 2020)

Alexandar Lazarov (Bulgarian: Александър Лазаров, born 6 November 1997) is a Bulgarian inactive professional tennis player. His career-high singles ranking is world No. 272 achieved on 14 November 2022 and his best doubles ranking is No. 359 achieved on 3 February 2020.

== Professional career ==
=== 2016: Professional debut, first ITF title ===
In 2016 Lazarov made his debut at ATP level at the ATP Sofia Open. He received a wild card for the qualification of the event in his homeland, losing in two sets to the world No. 214 Marius Copil. A month later Alexandar made his debut for the Bulgaria Davis Cup team against Turkey, losing the first match to Marsel İlhan, but claiming his maiden win over Altuğ Çelikbilek in the second. In September he won his first ITF singles title at the Serbia F8 event in Sokobanja, defeating Filip Veger in the final.

=== 2017–2020: ATP debut, ATP Cup match win ===
Lazarov lost in the first qualifying round at the ATP Sofia Open in 2017 and 2018, but at the 2019 event the Bulgarian defeated Lukáš Lacko and Luca Vanni to guarantee himself a spot in the main draw for the first time. In his ATP tour main draw debut Alexandar faced former world No. 7 Fernando Verdasco, but failed to score another upset, losing to the Spaniard 2–6 1–6. After the tournament Lazarov made his Top 500 debut in the ATP rankings.

Alexandar won his second ITF singles title in 2018 at the Georgia F3 event in Telavi and a year later he added another trophy to his collection, defeating Jordan Correia in the final of the M15 event in Casablanca.

In January 2020, Lazarov participated in the Bulgarian team in the inaugural 2020 ATP Cup where the top 24 countries qualified based on the singles ATP ranking of their No. 1 country player. The Bulgarian team was No. 19 based on Dimitrov's ranking and part of Group C. Lazarov and Grigor Dimitrov pulled a victory in doubles where as the underdogs they stunned the top British experienced pair of Jamie Murray/Joe Salisbury in a close three sets match.

=== 2021: ATP Challenger debut ===
At the beginning of the 2021 season Lazarov made the qualifying draw at the Antalya Open, but lost in three sets to Lucas Miedler. In July Alexander played his first ATP Challenger main draw match at the Iași Open after two wins in the qualification draw, but his run was stopped by Marius Copil. The Bulgarian's good form continued in the following week at the M25 event in Telavi, where he didn't lose a set on his way to his fourth ITF singles title.

In September, he received a wildcard for the main draw at the ATP Sofia Open, but could not score his maiden ATP win, losing 0–6 3–6 to Filip Krajinović. Lazarov finished his season with two consecutive ATP Challenger quarterfinals in Manama and in Antalya where he lost to the eventual champion Evgenii Tiurnev and reached a new career-high ranking of No. 405 on 13 December 2021.

=== 2022: First ATP Challenger semifinal and ATP singles win, Top 300 ===
In May Lazarov reached the quarterfinals of the Shymkent Challenger in Kazakhstan as a qualifier and as a result, he made his top 400 debut on 16 May 2022. Aleksandar continued his rise in the rankings during the summer after he won his fifth ITF title on home soil in Sofia as well as a final showing at the M25 event in Tbilisi the following week.

His best result to date came at the Rafa Nadal Open, where he made his way into the main draw and after five consecutive wins he reached his first semifinal on the ATP Challenger Tour as a qualifier. During his run in Manacor, Lazarov scored upset wins over world No. 132 Aleksandar Vukic and former No. 39 Mikhail Kukushkin before his run was stopped by the eventual champion Luca Nardi in three sets.

Ranked No. 334 at the 2022 Sofia Open, his home tournament, he won his first ATP tour level match and first against a top-100 player, overcoming world No. 74 Jiří Lehečka in straight sets. In the second round Lazarov player another spectacular match against World No. 30 Lorenzo Musetti and was just two points away from clinching his first ATP quarterfinal, but couldn't complete the upset, losing in three sets 7–6(5), 6–7(8), 2–6 to the Italian. At the same tournament in the doubles competition, he scored another ATP main draw win with Alexander Donski before losing in the quarterfinals to top seeds Fabio Fognini and Simone Bolelli. After the success at his home ATP tournament, Lazarov went on to win back to back M15 events in Sozopol, where he defeated Vladyslav Orlov and Maks Kaśnikowski to claim his sixth and seventh ITF title respectfully and securing his debut in the Top 300.

On 23 November 2022, he was confirmed as a participant at the 2023 United Cup as part of the Bulgarian team.

=== 2023: Historic Davis Cup qualification, ATP 500 debut, injury ===
Lazarov opened his 2023 season with a debut appearance at the United Cup, where he won his mixed doubles match partnering Isabella Shinikova against former doubles No. 1 Elise Mertens and David Goffin, sealing Bulgaria's first win in the tournament with 3–2 over Belgium.

Alexander was also part of the Bulgaria Davis Cup team in their World Group I Play-offs tie against New Zealand, where he won his singles match against Ajeet Rai, helping his home country on their way to a 3–1 win that saw them qualify for the World Group I for the first time in history.

In February, Lazarov received a wildcard for the qualifying draw at the 2023 Dubai Tennis Championships, making his maiden appearance at the ATP 500 level. The Bulgarian grabbed this opportunity and made his way into the main draw after scoring his second Top 100 win against World No. 92 Zhang Zhizhen in the first round in straight sets and then overcoming World No. 108 Francesco Passaro also in straight sets for a spot in the main draw. As a result, he moved more than 25 positions back into the top 275 in the rankings.

In May, at the 2023 Upper Austria Open Lazarov tore the Achilles tendon in his left leg during his first round match against Sandro Kopp. The Bulgarian went through surgery on the next day.

He received a wildcard for the main draw at the 2023 Sofia Open in singles and doubles. He lost to eventual semifinalist Pavel Kotov.

== Challenger and Futures/World Tennis Tour finals ==
=== Singles: 9 (7–2) ===
Legend (singles) ATP Challenger Tour (0–0) ITF Futures/World Tennis Tour (7–2)	Titles by surface Hard (2–1) Clay (5–1) Grass (0–0) Carpet (0–0)

Result	W–L	Date	Tournament	Tier	Surface	Opponent	Score
Win	1–0	Sep 2016	Serbia F8, Sokobanja	Futures	Clay	(Croatia) Filip Veger	6–7^{(2–7)}, 7–6^{(7–4)}, 3–0 ret.
Win	2–0	Jul 2018	Georgia F3, Telavi	Futures	Clay	(United States) Maksim Tikhomirov	6–3, 6–2
Win	3–0	Jul 2019	M15 Casablanca, Morocco	World Tennis Tour	Clay	(Brazil) Jordan Correia	6–4, 7–5
Loss	3–1	Jun 2021	M15 Skopje, North Macedonia	World Tennis Tour	Clay	(Serbia) Miljan Zekić	4–6, 6–7^{(5–7)}
Win	4–1	Aug 2021	M25 Telavi, Georgia	World Tennis Tour	Clay	(Georgia (country)) Aleksandre Metreveli	6–1, 1–0 ret.
Win	5–1	Jul 2022	M15 Sofia, Bulgaria	World Tennis Tour	Clay	(Romania) Vlad Andrei Dancu	6–1, 6–2
Loss	5–2	Jul 2022	M25 Tbilisi, Georgia	World Tennis Tour	Hard	Savva Polukhin	2–6, 4–6
Win	6–2	Oct 2022	M15 Sozopol, Bulgaria	World Tennis Tour	Hard	(Ukraine) Vladyslav Orlov	6–1, 6–1
Win	7–2	Oct 2022	M15 Sozopol, Bulgaria	World Tennis Tour	Hard	(Poland) Maks Kaśnikowski	6–2, 6–4

=== Doubles: 6 (2–4) ===
Legend (doubles) ATP Challenger Tour (0–0) ITF Futures/World Tennis Tour (2–4)	Titles by surface Hard (0–1) Clay (2–3) Grass (0–0) Carpet (0–0)

Result	W–L	Date	Tournament	Tier	Surface	Partner	Opponents	Score
Win	1–0	May 2017	Czech Republic F1, Prague	Futures	Clay	(Czech Republic) Dominik Kellovský	(Czech Republic) Daniel Paty (Czech Republic) Jan Valenta	6–1, 6–3
Loss	1–1	Jul 2018	Tunisia F25, Hammamet	Futures	Clay	(Argentina) Manuel Peña López	(Argentina) Juan Ignacio Galarza (Ecuador) Diego Hidalgo	5–7, 4–6
Loss	1–2	May 2019	M15 Sozopol, Bulgaria	World Tennis Tour	Hard	(Bulgaria) Alexander Donski	(United States) Alec Adamson (United States) Vasil Kirkov	6–4, 2–6, [6–10]
Loss	1–3	Jun 2019	M15 Kamen, Germany	World Tennis Tour	Clay	(Germany) Alexander Mannapov	(Russia) Shalva Dzhanashiya (Russia) Yan Sabanin	4–6, 5–7
Win	2–3	Aug 2019	M15 Curtea de Argeș, Romania	World Tennis Tour	Clay	(Romania) Călin Manda	(Romania) Petru-Alexandru Luncanu (Romania) Ștefan Paloși	6–4, 6–4
Loss	2–4	Mar 2022	M25 Rovinj, Croatia	World Tennis Tour	Clay	(Italy) Giovanni Fonio	(Austria) David Pichler (Czech Republic) Dalibor Svrčina	6–4, 2–6, [7–10]

== National participation ==
=== Davis Cup (11 wins, 8 losses) ===
Alexandar Lazarov debuted for the Bulgaria Davis Cup team in 2016. Since then he has 11 nominations with 12 ties played, his singles W/L record is 6–3 and doubles W/L record is 5–5 (11–8 overall).

Group membership World Group (0–0) WG Play-off (0–0) Group I (2–1) Group II (7–7) Group III (2–0) Group IV (0–0)	Matches by surface Hard (8–8) Clay (3–0) Grass (0–0) Carpet (0–0)	Matches by type Singles (6–3) Doubles (5–5)

- ▲ ▼ indicates the result of the Davis Cup match followed by the score, date, place of event, the zonal classification and its phase, and the court surface.

Rubber result	No.	Rubber	Match type (partner if any)	Opponent nation	Opponent player(s)	Score
▼2–3; 4–6 March 2016; Ankara Tenis Kulübü, Ankara, Turkey; Group II Europe/Africa First Round; Hard (i) surface
Defeat	1	II	Singles	Turkey	Marsel İlhan	4–6, 2–6, 3–6
Victory	2	V	Singles	Turkey	Altuğ Çelikbilek	4–6, 6–4, 6–4
▼2–3; 15–17 July 2016; Tennis Courts of Cité Nationale Sportive, Tunis, Tunisia; Group II Europe/Africa Relegation Play-Off; Hard surface
Defeat	3	II	Singles	Tunisia	Malek Jaziri	4–6, 4–6, 1–6
Defeat	4	III	Doubles (with Vasko Mladenov)	Tunisia	Malek Jaziri / Skander Mansouri	4–6, 4–6, 3–6
Victory	5	V	Singles	Tunisia	Aziz Dougaz	4–6, 6–4, 7–6^{(7–1)}
▲3–0; 6 April 2017; Holiday Village Santa Marina, Sozopol, Bulgaria; Group III Europe Round Robin; Hard surface
Victory	6	III	Doubles (with Tihomir Grozdanov)	Armenia	Mikayel Khachatryan / Sedrak Khachatryan	6–2, 6–1
▲3–0; 7 April 2017; Holiday Village Santa Marina, Sozopol, Bulgaria; Group III Europe Round Robin; Hard surface
Victory	7	III	Doubles (with Tihomir Grozdanov)	Greece	Petros Tsitsipas / Stamatios Kapiris	6–0, 6–4
▼1–4; 13–14 September 2019; Kelvin Grove Club, Cape Town, South Africa; Group II Europe/Africa First Round; Hard surface
Defeat	8	I	Singles	South Africa	Lloyd Harris	4–6, 7–6^{(7–3)}, 3–6
Defeat	9	III	Doubles (with Alexander Donski)	South Africa	Raven Klaasen / Ruan Roelofse	3–6, 2–6
▲4–1; 6–7 March 2020; Costa Rica Country Club, San José, Costa Rica; World Group II Play-Off; Hard surface
Victory	10	II	Singles	Costa Rica	Jesse Flores	7–5, 4–6, 6–3
Defeat	11	III	Doubles (with Adrian Andreev)	Costa Rica	Jesse Flores / Pablo Núñez	6–7^{(9–11)}, 6–4, 6–7^{(10–12)}
▼1–3; 5–6 March 2021; Sport Hall Sofia, Sofia, Bulgaria; World Group II; Hard (i)surface
Defeat	12	III	Doubles (with Gabriel Donev)	Mexico	Hans Hach Verdugo / Miguel Ángel Reyes-Varela	4–6, 4–6
▲3–1; 4–5 March 2022; Sport Hall Sofia, Sofia, Bulgaria; World Group II Play-Off; Hard (i) surface
Victory	13	II	Singles	Paraguay	Daniel Vallejo	6–4, 6–1
Victory	14	III	Doubles (with Alexander Donski)	Paraguay	Juan Borba / Hernando José Escurra Isnardi	6–3, 7–5
▲3–0; 16–18 September 2022; Bulgarian National Tennis Center, Sofia, Bulgaria; World Group II; Clay surface
Victory	15	II	Singles	South Africa	Philip Henning	6–0, 6–1
Victory	16	III	Doubles (with Alexander Donski)	South Africa	Lleyton Cronje / Raven Klaasen	6–3, 7–6^{(8–6)}
▲3–1; 4–5 February 2023; Wilding Park, Christchurch, New Zealand; World Group I Play-Off; Hard surface
Victory	17	I	Singles	New Zealand	Ajeet Rai	7–6^{(7–1)}, 6–2
▼1–3; 16–17 September 2023; Bulgarian National Tennis Center, Sofia, Bulgaria; World Group I; Clay surface
Victory	18	III	Doubles (with Alexander Donski)	Kazakhstan	Alexander Bublik / Aleksandr Nedovyesov	6–3, 6–3
▼1–3; 3–4 February 2024; Tennis Center Avenue, Burgas, Bulgaria; World Group I Play-Off; Hard (i) surface
Defeat	19	III	Doubles (with Alexander Donski)	Bosnia and Herzegovina	Mirza Bašić / Damir Džumhur	6–7^{(10–12)}, 3–6

=== ATP Cup (1 win, 2 losses) ===
Matches by type
Singles (0–0)
Doubles (1–2)

Result	No.	Rubber	Match type (partner if any)	Opponent nation	Opponent player(s)	Score
▲2–1; 3 January 2020; Ken Rosewall Arena, Sydney, Australia; Group stage; Hard surface
Victory	1	III	Doubles (with Grigor Dimitrov)	(United Kingdom) Great Britain	Jamie Murray / Joe Salisbury	7–6^{(7–5)}, 6–7^{(2–7)}, [11–9]
▲2–1; 5 January 2020; Ken Rosewall Arena, Sydney, Australia; Group stage; Hard surface
Defeat	2	III	Doubles (with Grigor Dimitrov)	Moldova	Radu Albot / Alexander Cozbinov	4–6, 6–7^{(4–7)}
▼1–2; 7 January 2020; Ken Rosewall Arena, Sydney, Australia; Group stage; Hard surface
Defeat	3	III	Doubles (with Grigor Dimitrov)	Belgium	Sander Gillé / Joran Vliegen	6–3, 4–6, [7–10]

=== United Cup (1 win, 0 losses) ===
Matches by type
Singles (0–0)
Doubles (1–0)

Result	No.	Rubber	Match type (partner if any)	Opponent nation	Opponent player(s)	Score
▲3–2; 31 December 2022 – 1 January 2023; Perth Arena, Perth, Australia; Group stage; Hard surface
Victory	1	V	Doubles (with Isabella Shinikova)	Belgium	David Goffin / Elise Mertens	1–6, 7–6^{(7–5)}, [10–6]

== Personal life ==
Lazarov is the son of former Bulgarian tennis player Krasimir Lazarov. He has a younger brother, George Lazarov who is also a professional tennis player. Lazarov got engaged to Miss Bulgaria runner up Ina Marholeva in June 2025 and celebrated with a degustation of the mid menu offerings in Djokovic's restaurant in Belgrade, Serbia.
