= 2020 ATP Cup =

- Date: 3–12 January
- Edition: 1st
- Category: ATP Cup
- Draw: 24 teams
- Prize money: $15,000,000
- Surface: Hard
- Location: Brisbane, Perth, and Sydney, Australia
- Venue: Pat Rafter Arena; RAC Arena; Ken Rosewall Arena

Champions
- Serbia
ATP Cup	· 2021 →

The 2020 ATP Cup was the first edition of the ATP Cup, an international outdoor hard court men's team tennis tournament held by the Association of Tennis Professionals (ATP). Serving as the opener for the 2020 ATP Tour, it was the first ATP team tournament since the last edition of the World Team Cup in 2012. It was held on 3–12 January 2020 at three venues in the Australian cities of Brisbane, Perth, and Sydney.

Serbia won the tournament, defeating Spain 2–1 in the final.

== Background ==
On 1 July 2018, ATP director, Chris Kermode announced that he had plans to organize a men's team tennis tournament which came after the Davis Cup changed their format six months earlier. The tournament which at the time of the announcement had the name World Team Cup which was identical to the previous World Team Cup that took place in Düsseldorf from 1978 to 2012.

Four months later, on 15 November, the ATP with Tennis Australia announced that the tournament was renamed to the ATP Cup with twenty four teams playing at three cities in preparation for the Australian Open. Those cities would later be revealed to be Sydney, Brisbane and Perth.

The Hopman Cup was axed to make way for the new tournament.

== ATP ranking points ==
Type	Player ranked	Round	Points per win vs. opponent ranked					
Type	Player ranked	Round	No. 1–10	No. 11–20	No. 21–30	No. 31–50	No. 51–100	No. 101+
Singles	No. 1–300	Final	250	200	150	105	75	50
Singles	No. 1–300	Semi-finals	180	140	105	75	50	35
Singles	No. 1–300	Quarter-finals	120	100	75	50	35	25
Singles	No. 1–300	Group stage	75	65	50	35	25	20
Singles	No. 301+	Final	85					55
Singles	No. 301+	Semi-finals	55					35
Singles	No. 301+	Quarter-finals	35					25
Singles	No. 301+	Group stage	25					15
Doubles	Any	Final	80					
Doubles	Any	Semi-finals	75					
Doubles	Any	Quarter-finals	55					
Doubles	Any	Group stage	40					

- Maximum 750 points for undefeated singles player, 250 points for doubles.

== Entries ==
In September 2019, the first 18 countries in the ATP Cup Standings qualified for the ATP Cup, based on the ATP ranking of its No. 1 singles player on 9 September and their commitment to play the event. Host country Australia received a wild card. Switzerland withdrew after world number 3 rated Roger Federer withdrew from the event for personal reasons. The final six teams qualified in November, based on ATP rankings at 11 November.

#	Nation	No. 1 Player	Ranking as of		No. 2 Player	No. 3 Player	No. 4 Player	No. 5 Player	Captain
#	Nation	No. 1 Player	9 Sep	11 Nov	No. 2 Player	No. 3 Player	No. 4 Player	No. 5 Player	Captain
1	Serbia	Novak Djokovic	1	2	Dušan Lajović	Nikola Milojević	Viktor Troicki	Nikola Ćaćić	Nenad Zimonjić
2	Spain	Rafael Nadal	2	1	Roberto Bautista Agut	Pablo Carreño Busta	Albert Ramos Viñolas	Feliciano López	Francisco Roig
3	Russia	Daniil Medvedev	4	4	Karen Khachanov	Teymuraz Gabashvili	Ivan Nedelko	Konstantin Kravchuk	Marat Safin
4	Austria	Dominic Thiem	5	5	Dennis Novak	Sebastian Ofner	Jürgen Melzer	Oliver Marach	Thomas Muster
5	Germany	Alexander Zverev	6	7	Jan-Lennard Struff	Mats Moraing	Kevin Krawietz	Andreas Mies	Boris Becker
6	Greece	Stefanos Tsitsipas	7	6	Michail Pervolarakis	Markos Kalovelonis	Petros Tsitsipas	Alexandros Skorilas	Apostolos Tsitsipas
7	Japan	Yoshihito Nishioka	58	69	Go Soeda	Toshihide Matsui	Ben McLachlan	—	Satoshi Iwabuchi
8	Italy	Fabio Fognini	11	12	Stefano Travaglia	Paolo Lorenzi	Alessandro Giannessi	Simone Bolelli	Alberto Giraudo
9	France	Gaël Monfils	12	10	Benoît Paire	Gilles Simon	Nicolas Mahut	Édouard Roger-Vasselin	Gilles Simon
10	Belgium	David Goffin	14	11	Steve Darcis	Kimmer Coppejans	Sander Gillé	Joran Vliegen	Steve Darcis
11	Croatia	Borna Ćorić	15	28	Marin Čilić	Viktor Galović	Nikola Mektić	Ivan Dodig	Luka Kutanjac
12	Argentina	Diego Schwartzman	16	14	Guido Pella	Juan Ignacio Londero	Andrés Molteni	Máximo González	Gastón Gaudio
13	Georgia	Nikoloz Basilashvili	17	26	Aleksandre Metreveli	George Tsivadze	Aleksandre Bakshi	Zura Tkemaladze	David Kvernadze
14	South Africa	Kevin Anderson	18	92	Lloyd Harris	Ruan Roelofse	Khololwam Montsi	Raven Klaasen	Jeff Coetzee
15	United States	John Isner	20	19	Taylor Fritz	Tommy Paul	Rajeev Ram	Austin Krajicek	David Macpherson
16	Canada	Denis Shapovalov	33	15	Félix Auger-Aliassime	Steven Diez	Peter Polansky	Adil Shamasdin	Adriano Fuorivia
17	Great Britain	Dan Evans	48	42	Cameron Norrie	James Ward	Joe Salisbury	Jamie Murray	Tim Henman
18 (WC)	Australia	Alex de Minaur	31	18	Nick Kyrgios	John Millman	John Peers	Chris Guccione	Lleyton Hewitt
19	Bulgaria	Grigor Dimitrov	25	20	Dimitar Kuzmanov	Alexandar Lazarov	Adrian Andreev	Alexander Donski	Grigor Dimitrov
20	Chile	Cristian Garín	34	34	Nicolás Jarry	Alejandro Tabilo	Tomás Barrios	Hans Podlipnik Castillo	Paul Capdeville
21	Poland	Hubert Hurkacz	36	37	Kamil Majchrzak	Kacper Żuk	Wojciech Marek	Łukasz Kubot	Marcin Matkowski
22	Uruguay	Pablo Cuevas	44	45	Martín Cuevas	Juan Martín Fumeaux	Franco Roncadelli	Ariel Behar	Felipe Maccio
23	Moldova	Radu Albot	42	46	Alexander Cozbinov	Egor Matvievici	Dmitrii Baskov	—	Vladimir Albot
24	Norway	Casper Ruud	60	55	Viktor Durasovic	Lukas Hellum Lilleengen	Herman Høyeraal	Leyton Rivera	Christian Ruud

Qualified in September 2019
Qualified in November 2019

=== Replacement players ===
Nation	Replacement	Original player	Rank 11 Nov	Reason
Italy	Alessandro Giannessi	Matteo Berrettini	8	Abdominal injury
France	Gilles Simon	Lucas Pouille	22	Elbow injury
Great Britain	James Ward	Andy Murray	125 (PR 2)	Pelvis injury
Japan	Toshihide Matsui	Yasutaka Uchiyama	78	Injury
Japan	Go Soeda	Kei Nishikori	13	Elbow injury

== Venues ==
Perth	Sydney	Brisbane
RAC Arena	Ken Rosewall Arena	Pat Rafter Arena
Capacity: 15,500	Capacity: 10,500	Capacity: 5,500
2020 ATP Cup is located in Australia

== Format ==
The 24 teams were divided into six groups of four teams each in a round-robin format. The six winners of each group and the two best runners-up would qualify for the quarter-finals. A country's position within its group was determined by ties won, then matches won, and then sets and games won percentages unless two or more teams were tied, in which case a head-to-head win took precedence over matches won.

== Group stage ==
The draw for the ATP Cup was revealed on 16 September 2019 with Brisbane getting Groups A and F, Perth getting Groups B and D, and Sydney getting Groups C and E. On 14 November, the final five qualifiers were placed in the draw, along with Bulgaria, who were entered the competition after Switzerland withdrew after Roger Federer declined to participate due to logistical and travel issues.

Qualified for the knockout stage
Eliminated

=== Overview ===
G = Group, T = Ties, M = Matches, S = Sets

G	First place				Second place				Third place				Fourth place			
G	Nation	T	M	S	Nation	T	M	S	Nation	T	M	S	Nation	T	M	S
A	Serbia	3–0	7–2	15–6	South Africa	2–1	5–4	12–10	France	1–2	4–5	10–13	Chile	0–3	2–7	6–14
B	Spain	3–0	9–0	18–2	Japan	2–1	5–4	11–9	Georgia	1–2	3–6	7–13	Uruguay	0–3	1–8	4–16
C	Great Britain	2–1	6–3	14–7	Belgium	2–1	6–3	12–10	Bulgaria	2–1	5–4	13–10	Moldova	0–3	1–8	4–16
D	Russia	3–0	8–1	16–4	Italy	2–1	5–4	11–9	Norway	1–2	3–6	6–14	United States	0–3	2–7	8–14
E	Argentina	2–1	5–4	12–10	Croatia	2–1	5–4	11–10	Poland	1–2	4–5	10–13	Austria	1–2	4–5	12–12
F	Australia	3–0	9–0	18–5	Canada	2–1	5–4	12–8	Germany	1–2	3–6	7–13	Greece	0–3	1–8	5–16

=== Group A ===
Pos.	Country	Ties	Matches	Sets	S %	Games	G %
1	Serbia	3–0	7–2	15–6	71.4	114–92	55.3
2	South Africa	2–1	5–4	12–10	54.5	102–101	50.3
3	France	1–2	4–5	10–13	43.5	110–110	50.0
4	Chile	0–3	2–7	6–14	30.0	81–104	43.8

==== France vs. Chile ====
France
2
Brisbane
4 January 2020

Chile
1

			1	2	3
1	(France) (Chile)	Benoît Paire; Nicolás Jarry	6^{3} 7^{7}	6; 3	6; 3
2	(France) (Chile)	Gaël Monfils; Cristian Garín	6; 3	7; 5
3	(France) (Chile)	Nicolas Mahut / Édouard Roger-Vasselin; Cristian Garín / Nicolás Jarry	5; 7	2; 6

==== Serbia vs. South Africa ====
Serbia
3
Brisbane
4 January 2020

South Africa
0

			1	2	3
1	(Serbia) (South Africa)	Dušan Lajović; Lloyd Harris	3; 6	7^{7} 6^{4}	6; 3
2	(Serbia) (South Africa)	Novak Djokovic; Kevin Anderson	7^{7} 6^{5}	7^{8} 6^{6}
3	(Serbia) (South Africa)	Nikola Ćaćić / Viktor Troicki; Raven Klaasen / Ruan Roelofse	6; 3	6; 2

==== South Africa vs. Chile ====
South Africa
3
Brisbane
6 January 2020

Chile
0

			1	2	3
1	(South Africa) (Chile)	Lloyd Harris; Nicolás Jarry	6; 4	6; 4
2	(South Africa) (Chile)	Kevin Anderson; Cristian Garín	6; 0	6; 3
3	(South Africa) (Chile)	Raven Klaasen / Ruan Roelofse; Cristian Garín / Nicolás Jarry	1; 6	6; 3	[10] [7]

==== Serbia vs. France ====
Serbia
2
Brisbane
6 January 2020

France
1

			1	2	3
1	(Serbia) (France)	Dušan Lajović; Benoît Paire	2; 6	7^{8} 6^{6}	4; 6
2	(Serbia) (France)	Novak Djokovic; Gaël Monfils	6; 3	6; 2
3	(Serbia) (France)	Novak Djokovic / Viktor Troicki; Nicolas Mahut / Édouard Roger-Vasselin	6; 3	6^{5} 7^{7}	[10] [3]

==== Serbia vs. Chile ====
Serbia
2
Brisbane
8 January 2020

Chile
1

			1	2	3
1	(Serbia) (Chile)	Dušan Lajović; Nicolás Jarry	6; 2	7^{7} 6^{3}
2	(Serbia) (Chile)	Novak Djokovic; Cristian Garín	6; 3	6; 3
3	(Serbia) (Chile)	Nikola Ćaćić / Viktor Troicki; Nicolás Jarry / Alejandro Tabilo	3; 6	6^{2} 7^{7}

==== France vs. South Africa ====
France
1
Brisbane
8 January 2020

South Africa
2

			1	2	3
1	(France) (South Africa)	Gilles Simon; Lloyd Harris	2; 6	6; 2	6; 2
2	(France) (South Africa)	Benoît Paire; Kevin Anderson	6; 2	6^{1} 7^{7}	6^{5} 7^{7}
3	(France) (South Africa)	Nicolas Mahut / Édouard Roger-Vasselin; Raven Klaasen / Ruan Roelofse	3; 6	4; 6

=== Group B ===
Pos.	Country	Ties	Matches	Sets	S %	Games	G %
1	Spain	3–0	9–0	18–2	90.0	108–56	65.9
2	Japan	2–1	5–4	11–9	55.0	99–80	55.3
3	Georgia	1–2	3–6	7–13	35.0	72–100	41.9
4	Uruguay	0–3	1–8	4–16	20.0	57–100	36.3

==== Japan vs. Uruguay ====
Japan
3
Perth
4 January 2020

Uruguay
0

			1	2	3
1	(Japan) (Uruguay)	Go Soeda; Martín Cuevas	6; 1	6; 3
2	(Japan) (Uruguay)	Yoshihito Nishioka; Pablo Cuevas	6; 0	6; 1
3	(Japan) (Uruguay)	Toshihide Matsui / Ben McLachlan; Ariel Behar / Pablo Cuevas	7^{7} 6^{5}	6; 4

==== Spain vs. Georgia ====
Spain
3
Perth
4 January 2020

Georgia
0

			1	2	3
1	(Spain) (Georgia (country))	Roberto Bautista Agut; Aleksandre Metreveli	6; 0	6; 0
2	(Spain) (Georgia (country))	Rafael Nadal; Nikoloz Basilashvili	6; 3	7; 5
3	(Spain) (Georgia (country))	Pablo Carreño Busta / Feliciano López; Aleksandre Bakshi / George Tsivadze	6; 3	6; 4

==== Japan vs. Georgia ====
Japan
2
Perth
6 January 2020

Georgia
1

			1	2	3
1	(Japan) (Georgia (country))	Go Soeda; Aleksandre Metreveli	4; 6	6; 3	6; 2
2	(Japan) (Georgia (country))	Yoshihito Nishioka; Nikoloz Basilashvili	6; 2	6; 3
3	(Japan) (Georgia (country))	Toshihide Matsui / Ben McLachlan; Aleksandre Bakshi / Zura Tkemaladze	2; 6	4; 6

==== Spain vs. Uruguay ====
Spain
3
Perth
6 January 2020

Uruguay
0

			1	2	3
1	(Spain) (Uruguay)	Roberto Bautista Agut; Franco Roncadelli	6; 1	6; 2
2	(Spain) (Uruguay)	Rafael Nadal; Pablo Cuevas	6; 2	6; 1
3	(Spain) (Uruguay)	Pablo Carreño Busta / Feliciano López; Ariel Behar / Juan Martín Fumeaux	6; 1	3; 6	[10] [3]

==== Spain vs. Japan ====
Spain
3
Perth
8 January 2020

Japan
0

			1	2	3
1	(Spain) (Japan)	Roberto Bautista Agut; Go Soeda	6; 2	6; 4
2	(Spain) (Japan)	Rafael Nadal; Yoshihito Nishioka	7^{7} 6^{4}	6; 4
3	(Spain) (Japan)	Pablo Carreño Busta / Rafael Nadal; Ben McLachlan / Go Soeda	7^{7} 6^{5}	4; 6	[10] [6]

==== Georgia vs. Uruguay ====
Georgia
2
Perth
8 January 2020

Uruguay
1

			1	2	3
1	(Georgia (country)) (Uruguay)	Aleksandre Metreveli; Franco Roncadelli	6; 2	6; 1
2	(Georgia (country)) (Uruguay)	Nikoloz Basilashvili; Pablo Cuevas	6; 4	1; 6	6; 4
3	(Georgia (country)) (Uruguay)	Aleksandre Bakshi / Aleksandre Metreveli; Ariel Behar / Pablo Cuevas	2; 6	2; 6

=== Group C ===
Pos.	Country	Ties	Matches	Sets	S %	Games	G %
1	Great Britain	2–1	6–3	14–7	66.7	106–80	57.0
2	Belgium	2–1	6–3	12–10	54.5	103–97	51.5
3	Bulgaria	2–1	5–4	13–10	56.5	105–92	53.3
4	Moldova	0–3	1–8	4–16	20.0	71–116	38.0

==== Belgium vs. Moldova ====
Belgium
3
Sydney
3 January 2020

Moldova
0

			1	2	3
1	(Belgium) (Moldova)	Steve Darcis; Alexander Cozbinov	6; 4	6^{4} 7^{7}	7; 5
2	(Belgium) (Moldova)	David Goffin; Radu Albot	6; 4	6; 1
3	(Belgium) (Moldova)	Sander Gillé / Joran Vliegen; Radu Albot / Alexander Cozbinov	6^{5} 7^{7}	7^{7} 6^{4}	[11] [9]

==== Great Britain vs. Bulgaria ====
Great Britain
1
Sydney
3 January 2020

Bulgaria
2

			1	2	3
1	(United Kingdom) (Bulgaria)	Cameron Norrie; Dimitar Kuzmanov	6; 2	3; 6	6; 2
2	(United Kingdom) (Bulgaria)	Dan Evans; Grigor Dimitrov	6; 2	4; 6	1; 6
3	(United Kingdom) (Bulgaria)	Jamie Murray / Joe Salisbury; Grigor Dimitrov / Alexandar Lazarov	6^{5} 7^{7}	7^{7} 6^{2}	[9] [11]

==== Bulgaria vs. Moldova ====
Bulgaria
2
Sydney
5 January 2020

Moldova
1

			1	2	3
1	(Bulgaria) (Moldova)	Dimitar Kuzmanov; Alexander Cozbinov	6; 1	7; 5
2	(Bulgaria) (Moldova)	Grigor Dimitrov; Radu Albot	6; 2	6; 3
3	(Bulgaria) (Moldova)	Grigor Dimitrov / Alexandar Lazarov; Radu Albot / Alexander Cozbinov	4; 6	6^{4} 7^{7}

==== Belgium vs. Great Britain ====
Belgium
1
Sydney
5 January 2020

Great Britain
2

			1	2	3
1	(Belgium) (United Kingdom)	Steve Darcis; Cameron Norrie	6; 2	6; 4
2	(Belgium) (United Kingdom)	David Goffin; Dan Evans	4; 6	4; 6
3	(Belgium) (United Kingdom)	Sander Gillé / Joran Vliegen; Jamie Murray / Joe Salisbury	3; 6	6^{7} 7^{9}

==== Great Britain vs. Moldova ====
Great Britain
3
Sydney
7 January 2020

Moldova
0

			1	2	3
1	(United Kingdom) (Moldova)	Cameron Norrie; Alexander Cozbinov	6; 2	6; 2
2	(United Kingdom) (Moldova)	Dan Evans; Radu Albot	6; 2	6; 2
3	(United Kingdom) (Moldova)	Jamie Murray / Joe Salisbury; Radu Albot / Alexander Cozbinov	6; 2	6; 3

==== Belgium vs. Bulgaria ====
Belgium
2
Sydney
7 January 2020

Bulgaria
1

			1	2	3
1	(Belgium) (Bulgaria)	Steve Darcis; Dimitar Kuzmanov	0; 6	3; 6
2	(Belgium) (Bulgaria)	David Goffin; Grigor Dimitrov	4; 6	6; 2	6; 2
3	(Belgium) (Bulgaria)	Sander Gillé / Joran Vliegen; Grigor Dimitrov / Alexandar Lazarov	3; 6	6; 4	[10] [7]

=== Group D ===
Pos.	Country	Ties	Matches	Sets	S %	Games	G %
1	Russia	3–0	8–1	16–4	80.0	111–75	59.7
2	Italy	2–1	5–4	11–9	55.0	94–94	50.0
3	Norway	1–2	3–6	6–14	30.0	80–106	43.0
4	United States	0–3	2–7	8–14	36.4	100–110	47.6

==== United States vs. Norway ====
United States
1
Perth
3 January 2020

Norway
2

			1	2	3
1	(United States) (Norway)	Taylor Fritz; Viktor Durasovic	6; 2	6; 2
2	(United States) (Norway)	John Isner; Casper Ruud	7^{7} 6^{3}	6^{10} 7^{12}	5; 7
3	(United States) (Norway)	Austin Krajicek / Rajeev Ram; Viktor Durasovic / Casper Ruud	6; 4	3; 6	[5] [10]

==== Russia vs. Italy ====
Russia
3
Perth
3 January 2020

Italy
0

			1	2	3
1	(Russia) (Italy)	Karen Khachanov; Stefano Travaglia	7; 5	6; 3
2	(Russia) (Italy)	Daniil Medvedev; Fabio Fognini	1; 6	6; 1	6; 3
3	(Russia) (Italy)	Karen Khachanov / Daniil Medvedev; Simone Bolelli / Paolo Lorenzi	6; 4	6; 3

==== Italy vs. Norway ====
Italy
2
Perth
5 January 2020

Norway
1

			1	2	3
1	(Italy) (Norway)	Stefano Travaglia; Viktor Durasovic	6; 1	6; 1
2	(Italy) (Norway)	Fabio Fognini; Casper Ruud	2; 6	2; 6
3	(Italy) (Norway)	Simone Bolelli / Fabio Fognini; Viktor Durasovic / Casper Ruud	6; 3	7^{7} 6^{3}

==== Russia vs. United States ====
Russia
2
Perth
5 January 2020

United States
1

			1	2	3
1	(Russia) (United States)	Karen Khachanov; Taylor Fritz	3; 6	7; 5	6; 1
2	(Russia) (United States)	Daniil Medvedev; John Isner	6; 3	6; 1
3	(Russia) (United States)	Karen Khachanov / Daniil Medvedev; Austin Krajicek / Rajeev Ram	3; 6	4; 6

==== Russia vs. Norway ====
Russia
3
Perth
7 January 2020

Norway
0

			1	2	3
1	(Russia) (Norway)	Karen Khachanov; Viktor Durasovic	6; 2	6; 1
2	(Russia) (Norway)	Daniil Medvedev; Casper Ruud	6; 3	7^{8} 6^{6}
3	(Russia) (Norway)	Teymuraz Gabashvili / Konstantin Kravchuk; Viktor Durasovic / Casper Ruud	7^{7} 6^{4}	6; 4

==== Italy vs. United States ====
Italy
3
Perth
7 January 2020

United States
0

			1	2	3
1	(Italy) (United States)	Stefano Travaglia; Taylor Fritz	7^{7} 6^{3}	7^{7} 6^{1}
2	(Italy) (United States)	Fabio Fognini; John Isner	6; 4	7^{7} 6^{5}
3	(Italy) (United States)	Simone Bolelli / Fabio Fognini; Austin Krajicek / Rajeev Ram	6; 4	6^{5} 7^{7}	[10] [3]

=== Group E ===
Pos.	Country	Ties	Matches	Sets	S %	Games	G %
1	Argentina	2–1	5–4	12–10	54.5	100–91	52.4
2	Croatia	2–1	5–4	11–10	52.4	97–98	49.7
3	Poland	1–2	4–5	10–13	43.5	101–111	47.6
4	Austria	1–2	4–5	12–12	50.0	120–118	50.4

==== Argentina vs. Poland ====
Argentina
2
Sydney
4 January 2020

Poland
1

			1	2	3
1	(Argentina) (Poland)	Guido Pella; Kamil Majchrzak	6; 2	2; 6	6; 2
2	(Argentina) (Poland)	Diego Schwartzman; Hubert Hurkacz	6; 4	2; 6	3; 6
3	(Argentina) (Poland)	Máximo González / Andrés Molteni; Hubert Hurkacz / Łukasz Kubot	6; 2	6; 4

==== Austria vs. Croatia ====
Austria
0
Sydney
4 January 2020

Croatia
3

			1	2	3
1	(Austria) (Croatia)	Dennis Novak; Marin Čilić	7^{7} 6^{4}	4; 6	4; 6
2	(Austria) (Croatia)	Dominic Thiem; Borna Ćorić	6^{4} 7^{7}	6; 2	3; 6
3	(Austria) (Croatia)	Oliver Marach / Jürgen Melzer; Ivan Dodig / Nikola Mektić	6^{4} 7^{7}	2; 6

==== Croatia vs. Poland ====
Croatia
2
Sydney
6 January 2020

Poland
1

			1	2	3
1	(Croatia) (Poland)	Marin Čilić; Kacper Żuk	7^{10} 6^{8}	6; 4
2	(Croatia) (Poland)	Borna Ćorić; Hubert Hurkacz	2; 6	2; 6
3	(Croatia) (Poland)	Ivan Dodig / Nikola Mektić; Hubert Hurkacz / Łukasz Kubot	6; 2	6; 1

==== Austria vs. Argentina ====
Austria
3
Sydney
6 January 2020

Argentina
0

			1	2	3
1	(Austria) (Argentina)	Dennis Novak; Guido Pella	0; 6	6; 4	6; 4
2	(Austria) (Argentina)	Dominic Thiem; Diego Schwartzman	6; 3	7^{7} 6^{3}
3	(Austria) (Argentina)	Oliver Marach / Jürgen Melzer; Máximo González / Andrés Molteni	6; 1	6; 4

==== Austria vs. Poland ====
Austria
1
Sydney
8 January 2020

Poland
2

			1	2	3
1	(Austria) (Poland)	Dennis Novak; Kacper Żuk	7; 5	6^{3} 7^{7}	3; 6
2	(Austria) (Poland)	Dominic Thiem; Hubert Hurkacz	6; 3	4; 6	6^{5} 7^{7}
3	(Austria) (Poland)	Oliver Marach / Jürgen Melzer; Hubert Hurkacz / Łukasz Kubot	6^{3} 7^{7}	6; 3	[11] [9]

==== Croatia vs. Argentina ====
Croatia
0
Sydney
8 January 2020

Argentina
3

			1	2	3
1	(Croatia) (Argentina)	Marin Čilić; Guido Pella	6^{1} 7^{7}	3; 6
2	(Croatia) (Argentina)	Borna Ćorić; Diego Schwartzman	2; 6	2; 6
3	(Croatia) (Argentina)	Ivan Dodig / Nikola Mektić; Máximo González / Andrés Molteni	6; 3	3; 6	[2] [10]

=== Group F ===
Pos.	Country	Ties	Matches	Sets	S %	Games	G %
1	Australia	3–0	9–0	18–5	78.3	132–101	56.7
2	Canada	2–1	5–4	12–8	60.0	99–87	53.2
3	Germany	1–2	3–6	7–13	35.0	83–98	45.9
4	Greece	0–3	1–8	5–16	23.8	86–114	43.0

==== Greece vs. Canada ====
Greece
0
Brisbane
3 January 2020

Canada
3

			1	2	3
1	(Greece) (Canada)	Michail Pervolarakis; Félix Auger-Aliassime	1; 6	3; 6
2	(Greece) (Canada)	Stefanos Tsitsipas; Denis Shapovalov	6^{6} 7^{8}	6^{4} 7^{7}
3	(Greece) (Canada)	Michail Pervolarakis / Petros Tsitsipas; Félix Auger-Aliassime / Denis Shapovalov	2; 6	3; 6

==== Germany vs. Australia ====
Germany
0
Brisbane
3 January 2020

Australia
3

			1	2	3
1	(Germany) (Australia)	Jan-Lennard Struff; Nick Kyrgios	4; 6	6^{4} 7^{7}
2	(Germany) (Australia)	Alexander Zverev; Alex de Minaur	6; 4	6^{3} 7^{7}	2; 6
3	(Germany) (Australia)	Kevin Krawietz / Andreas Mies; Chris Guccione / John Peers	3; 6	4; 6

==== Canada vs. Australia ====
Canada
0
Brisbane
5 January 2020

Australia
3

			1	2	3
1	(Canada) (Australia)	Félix Auger-Aliassime; John Millman	4; 6	2; 6
2	(Canada) (Australia)	Denis Shapovalov; Alex de Minaur	7^{8} 6^{6}	4; 6	2; 6
3	(Canada) (Australia)	Félix Auger-Aliassime / Adil Shamasdin; Chris Guccione / John Peers	6; 3	6^{3} 7^{7}	[8] [10]

==== Germany vs. Greece ====
Germany
2
Brisbane
5 January 2020

Greece
1

			1	2	3
1	(Germany) (Greece)	Jan-Lennard Struff; Michail Pervolarakis	6; 4	6; 1
2	(Germany) (Greece)	Alexander Zverev; Stefanos Tsitsipas	1; 6	4; 6
3	(Germany) (Greece)	Kevin Krawietz / Andreas Mies; Michail Pervolarakis / Stefanos Tsitsipas	3; 6	6; 3	[17] [15]

==== Germany vs. Canada ====
Germany
1
Brisbane
7 January 2020

Canada
2

			1	2	3
1	(Germany) (Canada)	Jan-Lennard Struff; Félix Auger-Aliassime	6; 1	6; 4
2	(Germany) (Canada)	Alexander Zverev; Denis Shapovalov	2; 6	2; 6
3	(Germany) (Canada)	Kevin Krawietz / Andreas Mies; Félix Auger-Aliassime / Denis Shapovalov	3; 6	6^{4} 7^{7}

==== Greece vs. Australia ====
Greece
0
Brisbane
7 January 2020

Australia
3

			1	2	3
1	(Greece) (Australia)	Michail Pervolarakis; John Millman	6; 4	1; 6	6^{1} 7^{7}
2	(Greece) (Australia)	Stefanos Tsitsipas; Nick Kyrgios	6^{7} 7^{9}	7^{7} 6^{3}	6^{5} 7^{7}
3	(Greece) (Australia)	Markos Kalovelonis / Petros Tsitsipas; Chris Guccione / John Peers	3; 6	4; 6

=== Ranking of runner-up teams ===
Pos.	Group	Country	Ties	Matches	Sets	S %	Games	G %
1	C	Belgium	2–1	6–3	12–10	54.5	103–97	51.5
2	F	Canada	2–1	5–4	12–8	60.0	99–87	53.2
3	B	Japan	2–1	5–4	11–9	55.0	99–80	55.3
4	D	Italy	2–1	5–4	11–9	55.0	94–94	50.0
5	A	South Africa	2–1	5–4	12–10	54.5	102–101	50.3
6	E	Croatia	2–1	5–4	11–10	52.4	97–98	49.7

== Knockout stage ==
The knockout stage took place at the Ken Rosewall Arena in Sydney.

=== Bracket ===
Quarterfinals
1	Spain	2
7	Belgium	1
2	Australia	2
5	Great Britain	1
3	Russia	3
6	Argentina	0
4	Serbia	3
8	Canada	0

Semifinals
1	Spain	3
2	Australia	0
3	Russia	0
4	Serbia	3

Final
1	Spain	1
4	Serbia	2

=== Quarter-finals ===
==== Great Britain vs. Australia ====
Great Britain
1
Sydney
9 January 2020

Australia
2

			1	2	3
1	(United Kingdom) (Australia)	Cameron Norrie; Nick Kyrgios	2; 6	2; 6
2	(United Kingdom) (Australia)	Dan Evans; Alex de Minaur	7^{7} 6^{4}	4; 6	7^{7} 6^{2}
3	(United Kingdom) (Australia)	Jamie Murray / Joe Salisbury; Alex de Minaur / Nick Kyrgios	6; 3	3; 6	[16] [18]

==== Argentina vs. Russia ====
Argentina
0
Sydney
9 January 2020

Russia
3

			1	2	3
1	(Argentina) (Russia)	Guido Pella; Karen Khachanov	2; 6	6^{4} 7^{7}
2	(Argentina) (Russia)	Diego Schwartzman; Daniil Medvedev	4; 6	6; 4	3; 6
3	(Argentina) (Russia)	Máximo González / Andrés Molteni; Teymuraz Gabashvili / Konstantin Kravchuk	6^{5} 7^{7}	4; 6

==== Serbia vs. Canada ====
Serbia
3
Sydney
10 January 2020

Canada
0

			1	2	3
1	(Serbia) (Canada)	Dušan Lajović; Félix Auger-Aliassime	6; 4	6; 2
2	(Serbia) (Canada)	Novak Djokovic; Denis Shapovalov	4; 6	6; 1	7^{7} 6^{4}
3	(Serbia) (Canada)	Nikola Ćaćić / Viktor Troicki; Peter Polansky / Adil Shamasdin	6; 3	6; 2

==== Belgium vs. Spain ====
Belgium
1
Sydney
10 January 2020

Spain
2

			1	2	3
1	(Belgium) (Spain)	Kimmer Coppejans; Roberto Bautista Agut	1; 6	4; 6
2	(Belgium) (Spain)	David Goffin; Rafael Nadal	6; 4	7^{7} 6^{3}
3	(Belgium) (Spain)	Sander Gillé / Joran Vliegen; Pablo Carreño Busta / Rafael Nadal	7^{9} 6^{7}	5; 7	[7] [10]

=== Semi-finals ===
==== Serbia vs. Russia ====
Serbia
3
Sydney
11 January 2020

Russia
0

			1	2	3
1	(Serbia) (Russia)	Dušan Lajović; Karen Khachanov	7; 5	7^{7} 6^{1}
2	(Serbia) (Russia)	Novak Djokovic; Daniil Medvedev	6; 1	5; 7	6; 4
3	(Serbia) (Russia)	Nikola Ćaćić / Viktor Troicki; Teymuraz Gabashvili / Konstantin Kravchuk	6; 4	7^{9} 6^{7}

==== Australia vs. Spain ====
Australia
0
Sydney
11 January 2020

Spain
3

			1	2	3
1	(Australia) (Spain)	Nick Kyrgios; Roberto Bautista Agut	1; 6	4; 6
2	(Australia) (Spain)	Alex de Minaur; Rafael Nadal	6; 4	5; 7	1; 6
3	(Australia) (Spain)	Chris Guccione / John Peers; Pablo Carreño Busta / Feliciano López	2; 6	7^{8} 6^{6}	[4] [10]

=== Final ===
==== Serbia vs. Spain ====
Serbia
2
Sydney
12 January 2020

Spain
1

			1	2	3
1	(Serbia) (Spain)	Dušan Lajović; Roberto Bautista Agut	5; 7	1; 6
2	(Serbia) (Spain)	Novak Djokovic; Rafael Nadal	6; 2	7^{7} 6^{4}
3	(Serbia) (Spain)	Novak Djokovic / Viktor Troicki; Pablo Carreño Busta / Feliciano López	6; 3	6; 4
