= Ireland Davis Cup team =

National sports team

Ireland
- Confederation: Tennis Europe
- Captain: Conor Niland
- Nations Ranking: 66 ▲21 September 2026
- First year: 1923
- Years played: 95
- Ties played (W–L): 179 (80–99)
- Years in World Group: 3 (2–1)
- Best finish: World Group First Round (1983)
- Most total wins: Owen Casey (33–16)
- Most singles wins: Owen Casey (21–9)
- Most doubles wins: Owen Casey (12–7)
- Best doubles team: Matt Doyle & Sean Sorensen (6–7)
- Most ties played: Owen Casey (26)
- Most years played: Michael Hickey (16)

The Ireland Davis Cup team represents the whole of the island of Ireland in Davis Cup tennis competition and are governed by Tennis Ireland. Ireland competed in its first Davis Cup in 1923.

Ireland currently compete in the World Group Zone II, having been promoted from Europe Zone Group III in 2021. They competed in World Group in 1983, and also reached the semifinals of the Europe Zone in 1936.

Players from Northern Ireland are, controversially for some, designated as holding Irish nationality by the International Tennis Federation, effectively compelling them to represent Ireland rather than Great Britain in international tennis competitions and the Olympic Games.

== Current squad ==
Player information and rankings as of 12 August 2026

Squad representing In 2025 & 2026 Games
Name	ATP ranking	Date of Birth	Most Recent Game
Peter Buldorini	1013	8 September 2004	vs Kosovo June 2026
Conor Gannon	1015	6 June 2002	vs Kosovo June 2026
Freddy Murray	1746	21 July 2003	vs Kosovo June 2026
Charles Barry	—N/a	9 May 2001	vs Kosovo June 2026
Michael Agwi	788	4 September 2003	vs Syria February 2026
Ammar Elamin	1459	19 June 2004	vs Syria February 2026
David O'Hare	—N/a	1 June 1990	vs China September 2025
Osgar O'Hoisin	—N/a	3 September 1996	vs Saudi Arabia January 2025

== Recent performances ==
=== 2000s ===
Year	Competition	Date	Surface	Location	Opponent	Score	Result
2002	Euro/Africa Zone Group II, 1st Round	3–5 May	Clay	Erevan (ARM)	Armenia	3–0	Win
2002	Euro/Africa Zone Group II, Quarterfinal	12-14 Jul	Clay	Portorož (SLO)	Slovenia	2–3	Loss
2003	Euro/Africa Zone Group II, 1st Round	4-6 Apr	Hard (i)	Dublin (IRE)	Egypt	4–1	Win
2003	Euro/Africa Zone Group II, Quarterfinal	11-13 Jul	Clay	Athens (GRE)	Greece	0–5	Loss
2004	Euro/Africa Zone Group II, 1st Round	9-11 Apr	Carpet (i)	Dublin (IRE)	Hungary	1–4	Loss
2004	Euro/Africa Zone Group II, Relegation Playoff	16-18 Jul	Hard	Donetsk (UKR)	Ukraine	1–4	Loss
2005	Euro/Africa Zone Group III, Round Robin	13 Jul	Carpet	Dublin (IRE)	Nigeria	3–0	Win
2005	Euro/Africa Zone Group III, Round Robin	14 Jul	Carpet	Dublin (IRE)	Armenia	3–0	Win
2005	Euro/Africa Zone Group III, Round Robin	15 Jul	Carpet	Dublin (IRE)	Iceland	3–0	Win
2005	Euro/Africa Zone Group III, 1st-4th Playoff	16 Jul	Carpet	Dublin (IRE)	Cyprus	1–2	Loss
2005	Euro/Africa Zone Group III, Promotion Playoff	17 Jul	Carpet	Dublin (IRE)	Tunisia	3–0	Win
2006	Euro/Africa Zone Group II, 1st Round	7-9 Apr	Hard (i)	Helsinki (FIN)	Finland	2–3	Loss
2006	Euro/Africa Zone Group II, Relegation Playoff	21-23 Jul	Grass	Dublin (IRE)	Slovenia	1–4	Loss
2007	Euro/Africa Zone Group III, Round Robin	9 May	Clay	Cairo (EGY)	Lithuania	2–1	Win
2007	Euro/Africa Zone Group III, Round Robin	10 May	Clay	Cairo (EGY)	Moldova	3–0	Win
2007	Euro/Africa Zone Group III, Round Robin	11 May	Clay	Cairo (EGY)	Bosnia and Herzegovina	3–0	Win
2007	Euro/Africa Zone Group III, 1st-4th Playoff	12 May	Clay	Cairo (EGY)	Egypt	3–0	Win
2007	Euro/Africa Zone Group III, Promotion Playoff	13 May	Clay	Cairo (EGY)	Turkey	2–1	Win
2008	Euro/Africa Zone Group II, 1st Round	11-13 Apr	Carpet (i)	Dublin (IRE)	Morocco	3–2	Win
2008	Euro/Africa Zone Group II, Quarterfinal	18-20 Jul	Grass	Dublin (IRE)	Ukraine	2–3	Loss
2009	Euro/Africa Zone Group II, 1st Round	6–8 Mar	Clay	Algiers (ALG)	Algeria	4–1	Win
2009	Euro/Africa Zone Group II, Quarterfinal	10–12 Jul	Hard	Nicosia (CYP)	Cyprus	2–3	Loss

=== 2010s ===
Year	Competition	Date	Surface	Location	Opponent	Score	Result
2010	Euro/Africa Zone Group II, 1st Round	5–7 Mar	Carpet (i)	Dublin, Ireland	Turkey	4–1	Win
2010	Euro/Africa Zone Group II, Quarterfinal	9–11 Jul	Carpet (i)	Dublin, Ireland	Lithuania	2–3	Loss
2011	Euro/Africa Zone Group II, 1st Round	4–6 Mar	Hard (i)	Dublin, Ireland	Luxembourg	2–3	Loss
2011	Euro/Africa Zone Group II, Relegation Playoff	8–11 Jul	Hard (i)	Dublin, Ireland	Tunisia	3–2	Win
2012	Euro/Africa Zone Group II, 1st Round	10–12 Feb	Carpet (i)	Szeged, Hungary	Hungary	2–3	Loss
2012	Euro/Africa Zone Group II, Relegation Playoff	6–8 Apr	Clay	Cairo, Egypt	Egypt	3–2	Win
2013	Euro/Africa Zone Group II, 1st Round	1–3 Feb	Hard (i)	Dublin, Ireland	Estonia	3–2	Win
2013	Euro/Africa Zone Group II, 2nd Round	5–7 Apr	Hard (i)	Dublin, Ireland	Finland	2–3	Loss
2014	Euro/Africa Zone Group II, 1st Round	31 Jan–2 Feb	Hard (i)	Minsk, Belarus	Belarus	1–4	Loss
2014	Euro/Africa Zone Group II, Relegation Playoff	4–6 Apr	Hard (i)	Dublin, Ireland	Egypt	3–2	Win
2015	Euro/Africa Zone Group II, 1st Round	6–8 Mar	Hard (i)	Dublin, Ireland	Belarus	0–5	Loss
2015	Euro/Africa Zone Group II, Relegation Playoff	17–19 Jul	Hard	Centurion, South Africa	South Africa	0–5	Loss
2016	Europe Zone Group III, 1st Round	2 Mar	Hard (i)	Tallinn, Estonia	Albania	3–0	Win
2016	Europe Zone Group III, 1st Round	3 Mar	Hard (i)	Tallinn, Estonia	Armenia	3–0	Win
2016	Europe Zone Group III, 1st Round	4 Mar	Hard (i)	Tallinn, Estonia	Macedonia	3–0	Win
2016	Europe Zone Group III, Promotion playoff	5 Mar	Hard (i)	Tallinn, Estonia	Cyprus	0–2	Loss
2017	Europe Zone Group III, 1st Round	6 Apr	Hard	Sozopol, Bulgaria	Andorra	3–0	Win
2017	Europe Zone Group III, 1st Round	6–7 Apr	Hard	Sozopol, Bulgaria	Kosovo	3–0	Win
2017	Europe Zone Group III, 1st Round	7–8 Apr	Hard	Sozopol, Bulgaria	Montenegro	2–1	Win
2017	Europe Zone Group III, Promotion playoff	8 Apr	Hard	Sozopol, Bulgaria	Bulgaria	2–1	Win
2018	Euro/Africa Zone Group II, 1st Round	3–4 Feb	Hard (i)	Birkerød, Denmark	Denmark	1–4	Loss
2018	Euro/Africa Zone Group II, Relegation Playoff	7–8 Apr	Hard (i)	Oslo, Norway	Norway	1–3	Loss
2019	Europe Zone Group IV, 1st round	16 Jul	Clay	San Marino	Kosovo	3–0	Win
2019	Europe Zone Group IV, 1st round	17 Jul	Clay	San Marino	Andorra	3–0	Win
2019	Europe Zone Group IV, 1st round	19 Jul	Clay	San Marino	Malta	3–0	Win
2019	Europe Zone Group IV, 1st to 2nd place playoff	20 Jul	Clay	San Marino	Malta	1–2	Loss

=== 2020s ===
Year	Competition	Date	Surface	Location	Opponent	Score	Result
2020–21	Europe Zone Group III, 1st round	16 Jun	Hard	Larnaca, Cyprus	Luxembourg	2–1	Win
2020–21	Europe Zone Group III, 1st round	17 Jun	Hard	Larnaca, Cyprus	Monaco	1–2	Loss
2020–21	Europe Zone Group III, 1st round	18 Jun	Hard	Larnaca, Cyprus	Malta	3–0	Win
2020–21	Europe Zone Group III, Promotional play-off	19 Jun	Hard	Larnaca, Cyprus	Georgia	2–1	Win
2022	World Group II play-offs	4–5 Mar	—N/a	—N/a	China	w/o	Win
2022	World Group II	16–17 Sep	Hard	Saint Michael, Barbados	Barbados	3–2	Win
2023	World Group I play-offs	3–4 Feb	Clay	Lima, Peru	Peru	4–0	Loss
2023	World Group II	16–17 Sep	Clay	Sonsonate, El Salvador	El Salvador	4–1	Win
2024	World Group I play-offs	3–4 Feb	Hard	Limerick, Ireland	Austria	0–4	Loss
2024	World Group II	13–14 Sep	Clay	Tunis, Tunisia	Tunisia	2–3	Loss
2025	World Group II play-offs	31 Jan–1 Feb	Hard	Riyadh, Saudi Arabia	Saudi Arabia	5–0	Win
2025	World Group II	12–14 Sep	Hard	Dublin, Ireland	China	1–3	Loss
2026	World Group II play-offs	7–8 Feb	Hard	Limerick, Ireland	Syria	2–3	Loss
2026	Europe Zone World Group III	10 Jun	Clay	Chișinău, Moldova	Montenegro	1–2	Loss
2026	Europe Zone World Group III	11 Jun	Clay	Chișinău, Moldova	Azerbaijan	3–0	Win
2026	Europe Zone World Group III	12 Jun	Clay	Chișinău, Moldova	Latvia	0–2	Loss
2026	Europe Zone World Group III Relegation Playoff	13 Jun	Clay	Chișinău, Moldova	Kosovo	2–0	Win

== Statistics ==
Rank	Player	Most matches played	Win-loss
1	Sean Sorensen	54	28–26
2	Owen Casey	49	33–16
3	George Lyttleton-Rogers	49	24–25
4	Matt Doyle	44	27–17
5	Michael Hickey	40	13–27
6	Eoin Collins	33	16–17
7	Peter Jackson	33	9–24
8	Scott Barron	30	17–13
9	Guy Jackson	30	13–17
10	Conor Niland	29	17–12

Rank	Player	Most wins
1	Owen Casey	33
2	Sean Sorensen	28
3	Matt Doyle	27
4	George Lyttleton-Rogers	24
5	Conor Niland	17
5	Scott Barron	17
7	Peter Wright	16
7	Eoin Collins	16
9	Jonathan Simpson	15
10	John Doran	13
10	Michael Hickey	13
10	Guy Jackson	13
13	Kevin Sorensen	12
14	Louk Sorensen	10

Rank	Player	Most singles wins
1	Owen Casey	21
2	Sean Sorensen	19
2	Matt Doyle	19
4	George Lyttleton-Rogers	18
5	Conor Niland	14
6	Scott Barron	11
7	Louk Sorensen	10
8	Guy Jackson	9
9	John Doran	8
9	Eoin Collins	8
11	Kevin Sorensen	7
11	Peter Jackson	7

Rank	Player	Most doubles wins
1	Owen Casey	12
2	Sean Sorensen	9
3	Peter Wright	8
3	Eoin Collins	8
3	Matt Doyle	8
6	Michael Hickey	7
7	Scott Barron	6
7	George Lyttleton-Rogers	6
9	Kevin Sorensen	5
9	John Doran	5

== See also ==
- Davis Cup
- Ireland Billie Jean King Cup team
