= 2022 Davis Cup World Group II =

International tennis competition

The 2022 Davis Cup World Group II was held on 16–18 September. The twelve winners from the World Group II will play at the World Group I Play-offs and the twelve losers will play at the World Group II Play-offs in 2023.

== Teams ==
Twenty-four teams participated in the World Group II, in series decided on a home and away basis. The seedings are based on the Nations Ranking of 7 March 2022.

These twenty-four teams are:

- 10 losing teams from World Group I Play-offs, in March 2022
- 12 winning teams from World Group II Play-offs, in March 2022
- 2 highest-ranked losing teams from World Group II Play-offs (China PR and Thailand)

The 12 winning teams from the World Group II will play at the World Group I Play-offs and the 12 losing teams will play at the World Group II Play-offs in 2023.

#: Nations Ranking as of 7 March 2022.

Seeded teams

- Uruguay (#41)
- Lebanon (#42)
- Lithuania (#43)
- Bolivia (#44)
- Chinese Taipei (#46)
- Slovenia (#47)
- Tunisia (#48)
- Denmark (#49)
- Poland (#50)
- South Africa (#51)
- Barbados (#52)
- Dominican Republic (#53)

Unseeded teams

- Hong Kong (#54)
- El Salvador (#55)
- Estonia (#56)
- Latvia (#57)
- Greece (#58)
- Bulgaria (#59)
- Egypt (#60)
- Indonesia (#61)
- Monaco (#62)
- Ireland (#63)
- China (#64)
- Thailand (#65)

== Results summary ==
Home team	Score	Away team	Location	Venue	Surface
Uruguay [1]	2–3	China	Montevideo	Carrasco Lawn Tenis Club	Clay
Lebanon [2]	3–2	Monaco	Zouk Mosbeh	Notre Dame University–Louaize	Hard
Lithuania [3]	4–1	Egypt	Vilnius	SEB Arena	Hard (i)
Thailand	3–1	Bolivia [4]	Bangkok	The Lawn Tennis Association of Thailand	Hard
Chinese Taipei [5]	3–1	Hong Kong	Taipei City	Taipei Tennis Center	Hard
Slovenia [6]	4–0	Estonia	Portorož	Tennis Center Portorož	Clay
Tunisia [7]	1–3	Greece	Tunis	Courts de Tennis	Hard
El Salvador	2–3	Denmark [8]	San José Villanueva	Club El Encanto	Hard
Poland [9]	5–0	Indonesia	Inowrocław	Hala Widowiskowo Sportowa	Hard (i)
Bulgaria	3–0	South Africa [10]	Sofia	National Tennis Centre	Clay
Barbados [11]	2–3	Ireland	St. Michael	National Tennis Centre	Hard
Latvia	3–2	Dominican Republic [12]	Jūrmala	National Tennis Centre Lielupe	Hard (i)

== World Group II results ==
=== Uruguay vs. China ===
Uruguay
2
Carrasco Lawn Tenis Club, Montevideo, Uruguay
16–17 September 2022
Clay

China
3

			1	2	3
1	(Uruguay) (China)	Ignacio Carou; Zhang Zhizhen	2; 6	2; 6
2	(Uruguay) (China)	Martín Cuevas; Bu Yunchaokete	4; 6	6; 4	7^{7} 6^{4}
3	(Uruguay) (China)	Ignacio Carou / Martín Cuevas; Te Rigele / Bu Yunchaokete	6; 4	6; 4
4	(Uruguay) (China)	Martín Cuevas; Zhang Zhizhen	0; 6	2; 6
5	(Uruguay) (China)	Ignacio Carou; Te Rigele	3; 6	6^{3} 7^{7}

=== Lebanon vs. Monaco ===
Lebanon
3
Notre Dame University–Louaize, Zouk Mosbeh, Lebanon
16–17 September 2022
Hard

Monaco
2

			1	2	3
1	(Lebanon) (Monaco)	Hady Habib; Valentin Vacherot	1; 6	6; 4	6; 3
2	(Lebanon) (Monaco)	Benjamin Hassan; Lucas Catarina	6; 3	6; 1
3	(Lebanon) (Monaco)	Benjamin Hassan / Hasan Ibrahim; Romain Arneodo / Hugo Nys	6; 2	6^{2} 7^{7}	4; 6
4	(Lebanon) (Monaco)	Benjamin Hassan; Valentin Vacherot	3; 6	6^{3} 7^{7}
5	(Lebanon) (Monaco)	Hady Habib; Hugo Nys	6; 2	6^{5} 7^{7}	6; 2

=== Lithuania vs. Egypt ===
Lithuania
4
SEB Arena, Vilnius, Lithuania
17–18 September 2022
Hard (i)

Egypt
1

			1	2	3
1	(Lithuania) (Egypt)	Edas Butvilas; Mohamed Safwat	6; 1	1; 6	2; 6
2	(Lithuania) (Egypt)	Ričardas Berankis; Amr Elsayed	6; 1	6; 2
3	(Lithuania) (Egypt)	Ričardas Berankis / Edas Butvilas; Karim-Mohamed Maamoun / Mohamed Safwat	4; 6	6; 1	6; 4
4	(Lithuania) (Egypt)	Ričardas Berankis; Mohamed Safwat	6; 2	6; 1
5	(Lithuania) (Egypt)	Ainius Sabaliauskas; Michael Bassem Sobhy	6; 3	7; 5

=== Thailand vs. Bolivia ===
Thailand
3
The Lawn Tennis Association of Thailand, Muang Thong Thani, Nonthaburi, Thailand
16–17 September 2022
Hard

Bolivia
1

			1	2	3
1	(Thailand) (Bolivia)	Kasidit Samrej; Federico Zeballos	6; 3	6; 2
2	(Thailand) (Bolivia)	Yuttana Charoenphon; Murkel Dellien	6; 2	0; 6	7^{8} 6^{6}
3	(Thailand) (Bolivia)	Pruchya Isaro / Thantub Suksumrarn; Boris Arias / Federico Zeballos	4; 6	4; 6
4	(Thailand) (Bolivia)	Kasidit Samrej; Murkel Dellien	5; 7	6; 2	6; 1
5	(Thailand) (Bolivia)	Yuttana Charoenphon; Juan Carlos Prado Ángelo				not played

=== Chinese Taipei vs. Hong Kong ===
Chinese Taipei
3
Taipei Tennis Center, Taipei City, Taiwan
17–18 September 2022
Hard

Hong Kong
1

			1	2	3
1	(Chinese Taipei) (Hong Kong)	Jason Jung; Coleman Wong	6; 1	4; 6	6^{8} 7^{10}
2	(Chinese Taipei) (Hong Kong)	Wu Tung-lin; Wong Hong-kit	6; 2	6; 2
3	(Chinese Taipei) (Hong Kong)	Ray Ho / Hsu Yu-hsiou; Wong Chun-hun / Coleman Wong	3; 6	7^{7} 6^{1}	7^{7} 6^{5}
4	(Chinese Taipei) (Hong Kong)	Wu Tung-lin; Coleman Wong	6; 1	6; 2
5	(Chinese Taipei) (Hong Kong)	Jason Jung; Wong Hong-kit				not played

=== Slovenia vs. Estonia ===
Slovenia
4
Tennis Center Portorož, Portorož, Slovenia
16–17 September 2022
Clay

Estonia
0

			1	2	3
1	(Slovenia) (Estonia)	Bor Artnak; Mark Lajal	0; 6	6; 1	6; 3
2	(Slovenia) (Estonia)	Aljaž Bedene; Kristjan Tamm	6^{5} 7^{7}	6; 3	6; 4
3	(Slovenia) (Estonia)	Aljaž Bedene / Blaž Kavčič; Kenneth Raisma / Mattias Siimar	6; 3	3; 6	6; 1
4	(Slovenia) (Estonia)	Matic Križnik; Mark Lajal	3; 4			retired
5	(Slovenia) (Estonia)	Bor Artnak; Kristjan Tamm				not played

=== Tunisia vs. Greece ===
Tunisia
1
Courts de Tennis, Tunis, Tunisia
16–17 September 2022
Hard

Greece
3

			1	2	3
1	(Tunisia) (Greece)	Aziz Dougaz; Stefanos Tsitsipas	6^{3} 7^{7}	2; 6
2	(Tunisia) (Greece)	Skander Mansouri; Michail Pervolarakis	4; 6	3; 6
3	(Tunisia) (Greece)	Malek Jaziri / Skander Mansouri; Michail Pervolarakis / Petros Tsitsipas	6^{5} 7^{7}	7^{7} 6^{5}	6; 3
4	(Tunisia) (Greece)	Skander Mansouri; Stefanos Tsitsipas	2; 6	4; 6
5	(Tunisia) (Greece)	Aziz Dougaz; Michail Pervolarakis				not played

=== El Salvador vs. Denmark ===
El Salvador
2
Club El Encanto, San José Villanueva, La Libertad, El Salvador
17–18 September 2022
Hard

Denmark
3

			1	2	3
1	(El Salvador) (Denmark)	Marcelo Arévalo; Elmer Møller	7^{7} 6^{2}	6; 4
2	(El Salvador) (Denmark)	César Cruz; Johannes Ingildsen	4; 6	4; 6
3	(El Salvador) (Denmark)	Marcelo Arévalo / Luis Miralles; Johannes Ingildsen / Frederik Nielsen	6; 2	4; 6	2; 6
4	(El Salvador) (Denmark)	Marcelo Arévalo; Christian Sigsgaard	3; 6	6; 2	6; 1
5	(El Salvador) (Denmark)	César Cruz; Elmer Møller	1; 6	0; 6

=== Poland vs. Indonesia ===
Poland
5
Hala Widowiskowo Sportowa, Inowrocław, Poland
16–17 September 2022
Hard (i)

Indonesia
0

			1	2	3
1	(Poland) (Indonesia)	Kamil Majchrzak; Nathan Anthony Barki	6; 0	6; 0
2	(Poland) (Indonesia)	Olaf Pieczkowski; Muhammad Rifqi Fitriadi	7; 5	6; 0
3	(Poland) (Indonesia)	Łukasz Kubot / Jan Zieliński; Nathan Anthony Barki / Christopher Rungkat	6; 3	6; 4
4	(Poland) (Indonesia)	Kamil Majchrzak; Tegar Abdi Satrio Wibowo	6; 0	6; 1
5	(Poland) (Indonesia)	Olaf Pieczkowski; Lucky Candra Kurniawan	6; 4	6; 2

=== Bulgaria vs. South Africa ===
Bulgaria
3
National Tennis Centre, Sofia, Bulgaria
16–18 September 2022
Clay

South Africa
0

			1	2	3
1	(Bulgaria) (South Africa)	Dimitar Kuzmanov; Lleyton Cronje	6; 3	6; 1
2	(Bulgaria) (South Africa)	Alexandar Lazarov; Philip Henning	6; 0	6; 1
3	(Bulgaria) (South Africa)	Alexander Donski / Alexandar Lazarov; Lleyton Cronje / Raven Klaasen	6; 3	7^{8} 6^{6}
4	(Bulgaria) (South Africa)	Dimitar Kuzmanov; Philip Henning				not played
5	(Bulgaria) (South Africa)	Alexandar Lazarov; Lleyton Cronje				not played

=== Barbados vs. Ireland ===
Barbados
2
National Tennis Centre, St. Michael, Barbados
16–17 September 2022
Hard

Ireland
3

			1	2	3
1	(Barbados) (Republic of Ireland)	Matthew Foster-Estwick; Simon Carr	2; 6	1; 6
2	(Barbados) (Republic of Ireland)	Darian King; Osgar O'Hoisin	7^{9} 6^{7}	6; 3
3	(Barbados) (Republic of Ireland)	Darian King / Haydn Lewis; Simon Carr / David O'Hare	6^{6} 7^{8}	3; 6
4	(Barbados) (Republic of Ireland)	Darian King; Simon Carr	6; 3	6; 2
5	(Barbados) (Republic of Ireland)	Marshall Kaipo; Osgar O'Hoisin	0; 6	3; 6

=== Latvia vs. Dominican Republic ===
Latvia
3
National Tennis Centre Lielupe, Jūrmala, Latvia
16–17 September 2022
Hard (i)

Dominican Republic
2

			1	2	3
1	(Latvia) (Dominican Republic)	Robert Strombachs; Peter Bertran	6; 3	6; 1
2	(Latvia) (Dominican Republic)	Kārlis Ozoliņš; Nick Hardt	6; 3	6; 4
3	(Latvia) (Dominican Republic)	Kārlis Ozoliņš / Robert Strombachs; Víctor Estrella Burgos / Nick Hardt	6; 3	4; 6	6; 3
4	(Latvia) (Dominican Republic)	Daniels Tens; Nick Hardt	2; 6	2; 6
5	(Latvia) (Dominican Republic)	Kārlis Ozoliņš; Peter Bertran	4; 6	6; 3	[3] [10]
