= Freddy Murray =

Irish tennis player (born 2003)

- Country (sports): Ireland
- Born: 21 July 2003 (age 22) Belfast, Northern Ireland
- Plays: Right-handed (two-handed backhand)
- College: UNC Asheville
- Prize money: $716

Singles
- Career record: 2–0 (at ATP Tour level, Grand Slam level, and in Davis Cup)
- Career titles: 0
- Highest ranking: No. 1,752 (19 August 2024)
- Current ranking: No. 1,904 (27 October 2025)
- Last updated on: 27 October 2025.

Freddy Murray (born 21 July 2003) is a tennis player from Northern Ireland. He has represented Ireland in the Davis Cup since 2023.

== Career ==
Murray went to school at Campbell College in Belfast, before taking up a tennis scholarship in the United States at UNC Asheville in 2022.

He made his debut for the Ireland Davis Cup team in their World Group II tie away against El Salvador in September 2023, where he double bageled José Flores as the Irish won 4–1.

Murray made his second appearance for Ireland against Saudi Arabia in February 2025, defeating Abdulmalek Bursais in his country's 5–0 win in the World Group II play-offs.
