= Osgar O'Hoisin =

Irish tennis player (born 1996)

- Country (sports): Ireland
- Residence: Madison, Wisconsin, U.S.
- Born: 3 September 1996 (age 29) Dublin, Ireland
- Height: 1.93 m (6 ft 4 in)
- Plays: Right-handed (two-handed backhand)
- College: Wisconsin Badgers
- Prize money: $38,309

Singles
- Career record: 3–4 (at ATP Tour level, Grand Slam level, and in Davis Cup)
- Career titles: 0
- Highest ranking: No. 732 (22 May 2023)

Doubles
- Career record: 0–3 (at ATP Tour level, Grand Slam level, and in Davis Cup)
- Career titles: 0
- Highest ranking: No. 587 (2 February 2024)

Osgar O'Hoisin (Irish: Osgar Ó hOisín; born 3 September 1996) is an Irish tennis player. He has a career high ATP singles ranking of No. 732 achieved on 22 May 2023 and a career high doubles ranking of No. 587 achieved on 2 February 2024.

He attended the University of Wisconsin–Madison, and played for the Wisconsin Badgers tennis team between 2015 and 2019.

== Career ==
O'Hoisin is a multiple time club champion in his boyhood club Donnybrook Tennis Club, in Dublin, Ireland. He was Irish under-18 champion in 2012 and 2015.

== National representation ==
O'Hoisin has represented Ireland at the Davis Cup since 2018. He has a win–loss record of 2–7 in singles and 3–1 in doubles. In 2022 he won the deciding match in Ireland's 3–2 win against Barbados in the World Group II competition.

In February 2024, he was a member of the Irish team which lost to Austria in the World Group I play-offs in Limerick, suffering a straight sets defeat against Sebastian Ofner in the second singles match.
