= Robin Forster =

Fijian lawn bowler

Personal information
- Nationality: Fijian
Medal record
Representing (Fiji)
Asia Pacific Bowls Championships
Bronze medal – third place	1985 Tweed Heads	fours
Gold medal – first place	1987 Lae	fours

Robin Forster is a former Fijian international lawn bowler.

== Bowls career ==
Forster has represented Fiji at the Commonwealth Games, in the fours at the 1986 Commonwealth Games.

She won a gold medal at the 1987 Asia Pacific Bowls Championships in the fours in Lae, Papua New Guinea. Two years earlier she had picked up a bronze medal in the fours at the inaugural 1985 Championships.
