= 2015 Davis Cup Europe Zone Group III =

International tennis competition

The Europe Zone was one of the four zones within Group 3 of the regional Davis Cup competition in 2015. The zone's competition was held in round robin format in San Marino, San Marino, in July 2015. The thirteen competing nations were divided into four pools of three or four teams. The winners from each pool played off to determine the two nations to be promoted to Europe/Africa Zone Group II in 2016, while the second and third placed nations played off to determine overall placings within the group.

== Participating nations ==
- Albania
- Armenia
- Cyprus
- Estonia
- Georgia
- Greece
- Iceland
- Liechtenstein
- Macedonia
- Malta
- Montenegro
- Norway
- San Marino

== Draw ==
The thirteen teams were divided into four pools of three or four teams, with one seeded nation in each pool.

Seeds	Remaining nations	
1. Cyprus; 2. Estonia; 3. Macedonia; 4. Georgia	Albania; Armenia; Greece; Iceland; Liechtenstein	Malta; Montenegro; Norway; San Marino

The winner of Pool A plays off against the winner of Pool C, and the winner of Pool B plays off against the winner of Pool D. The two winners of these play-offs are promoted to Europe/Africa Zone Group II in 2016. The second and third placed teams in each pool play off in the same pattern to determine overall rankings within the group. The fourth-placed team in Pool D does not enter the play-offs.

The group was staged from the 15th to the 18th July 2015 at the Centro Tennis Cassa di Risparmio in San Marino, San Marino.

Pool A

	Cyprus	Greece	San Marino	RR W–L	Matches W–L	Sets W–L	Games W–L	Standings
Cyprus		2–1	3–0	2–0	5–1	11–2	71–31	1
Greece	1–2		3–0	1–1	4–2	8–6	65–60	2
San Marino	0–3	0–3		0–2	0–6	1–12	31–76	3

Pool B

	Estonia	Montenegro	Liechtenstein	RR W–L	Matches W–L	Sets W–L	Games W–L	Standings
Estonia		3–0	3–0	2–0	6–0	12–0	72–21	1
Montenegro	0–3		3–0	1–1	3–3	6–6	51–51	2
Liechtenstein	0–3	0–3		0–2	0–6	0–12	23–74	3

Pool C

	Norway	Macedonia	Armenia	RR W–L	Matches W–L	Sets W–L	Games W–L	Standings
Norway		3–0	3–0	2–0	6–0	12–3	81–46	1
Macedonia	0–3		3–0	1–1	3–3	9–6	73–55	2
Armenia	0–3	0–3		0–2	0–6	0–12	19–72	3

Pool D

	Georgia	Malta	Iceland	Albania	RR W–L	Matches W–L	Sets W–L	Games W–L	Standings
Georgia		3–0	3–0	3–0	3–0	9–0	18–0	108–17	1
Malta	0–3		3–0	3–0	2–1	6–3	12–8	90–74	2
Iceland	0–3	0–3		3–0	1–2	3–6	7–12	71–94	3
Albania	0–3	0–3	0–3		0–3	0–9	1–18	29–113	4

== First round ==
=== Pool A ===
==== Cyprus vs. San Marino ====
Cyprus
3
Centro Tennis Cassa di Risparmio, San Marino, San Marino
15 July 2015
Red Clay, Outdoor

San Marino
0

			1	2	3
1	(Cyprus) (San Marino)	Christos Hadjigeorgiou; Pietro Grassi	6; 3	6; 0
2	(Cyprus) (San Marino)	Petros Chrysochos; Marco De Rossi	6; 1	6; 0
3	(Cyprus) (San Marino)	Christos Hadjigeorgiou / Leandros Papayiannis; Domenico Vicini / Diego Zonzini	6; 1	6; 1

==== Greece vs. San Marino ====
Greece
3
Centro Tennis Cassa di Risparmio, San Marino, San Marino
16 July 2015
Red Clay, Outdoor

San Marino
0

			1	2	3
1	(Greece) (San Marino)	Ioannis Stergiou; Pietro Grassi	6; 1	6; 1
2	(Greece) (San Marino)	Eleftherios Theodorou; Marco De Grassi	6; 4	3; 6	6; 4
3	(Greece) (San Marino)	Christos Antonopoulos / Ioannis Stergiou; Pietro Grassi / Diego Zonzini	7^{7} 6^{0}	6; 3

==== Cyprus vs. Greece ====
Cyprus
2
Centro Tennis Cassa di Risparmio, San Marino, San Marino
17 July 2015
Red Clay, Outdoor

Greece
1

			1	2	3
1	(Cyprus) (Greece)	Christos Hadjigeorgiou; Ioannis Stergiou	0; 6	6; 3	5; 7
2	(Cyprus) (Greece)	Petros Chrysochos; Eleftherios Theodorou	6; 1	6; 2
3	(Cyprus) (Greece)	Marcos Baghdatis / Petros Chrysochos; Ioannis Stergiou / Eleftherios Theodorou	6; 3	6; 2

=== Pool B ===
==== Estonia vs. Liechtenstein ====
Estonia
3
Centro Tennis Cassa di Risparmio, San Marino, San Marino
15 July 2015
Red Clay, Outdoor

Liechtenstein
0

			1	2	3
1	(Estonia) (Liechtenstein)	Vladimir Ivanov; Gian-Carlo Besimo	6; 0	6; 2
2	(Estonia) (Liechtenstein)	Jürgen Zopp; Vital Flurin Leuch	6; 2	6; 2
3	(Estonia) (Liechtenstein)	Vladimir Ivanov / Jürgen Zopp; Vital Flurin Leuch / Christian Meier	6; 0	6; 2

==== Montenegro vs. Liechtenstein ====
Montenegro
3
Centro Tennis Cassa di Risparmio, San Marino, San Marino
16 July 2015
Red Clay, Outdoor

Liechtenstein
0

			1	2	3
1	(Montenegro) (Liechtenstein)	Igor Saveljić; Gian-Carlo Besimo	7; 5	6; 1
2	(Montenegro) (Liechtenstein)	Ljubomir Čelebić; Vital Flurin Leuch	6; 0	6; 1
3	(Montenegro) (Liechtenstein)	Igor Saveljić / Ivan Saveljić; Gian-Carlo Besimo / Vital Flurin Leuch	6; 3	7; 5

==== Estonia vs. Montenegro ====
Estonia
3
Centro Tennis Cassa di Risparmio, San Marino, San Marino
17 July 2015
Red Clay, Outdoor

Montenegro
0

			1	2	3
1	(Estonia) (Montenegro)	Vladimir Ivanov; Igor Saveljić	6; 2	6; 3
2	(Estonia) (Montenegro)	Jürgen Zopp; Ljubomir Čelebić	6; 3	6; 4
3	(Estonia) (Montenegro)	Kenneth Raisma / Mattias Siimar; Rrezart Cungu / Ivan Saveljić	6; 1	6; 2

=== Pool C ===
==== Macedonia vs. Armenia ====
Macedonia
3
Centro Tennis Cassa di Risparmio, San Marino, San Marino
15 July 2015
Red Clay, Outdoor

Armenia
0

			1	2	3
1	(North Macedonia) (Armenia)	Dimitar Grabul; Mikayel Khachatryan	6; 1	6; 2
2	(North Macedonia) (Armenia)	Tomislav Jotovski; Mikayel Avetisyan	6; 0	6; 1
3	(North Macedonia) (Armenia)	Bojan Jankulovski / Gorazd Srbljak; Ashot Gevorgyan / Sedrak Khachatryan	6; 4	6; 2

==== Norway vs. Armenia ====
Norway
3
Centro Tennis Cassa di Risparmio, San Marino, San Marino
16 July 2015
Red Clay, Outdoor

Armenia
0

			1	2	3
1	(Norway) (Armenia)	Casper Ruud; Mikayel Khachatryan	6; 0	6; 0
2	(Norway) (Armenia)	Viktor Durasovic; Sedrak Khachatryan	6; 2	6; 3
3	(Norway) (Armenia)	Joachim Bjerke / Oystein Steiro; Mikayel Avetisyan / Ashot Gevorgyan	6; 4	6; 0

==== Macedonia vs. Norway ====
Macedonia
0
Centro Tennis Cassa di Risparmio, San Marino, San Marino
17 July 2015
Red Clay, Outdoor

Norway
3

			1	2	3
1	(North Macedonia) (Norway)	Dimitar Grabul; Casper Ruud	6; 1	1; 6	2; 6
2	(North Macedonia) (Norway)	Tomislav Jotovski; Viktor Durasovic	6; 4	3; 6	6^{7} 7^{9}
3	(North Macedonia) (Norway)	Bojan Jankulovski / Gorazd Srbljak; Joachim Bjerke / Oystein Steiro	6; 3	3; 6	4; 6

=== Pool D ===
==== Georgia vs. Albania ====
Georgia
3
Centro Tennis Cassa di Risparmio, San Marino, San Marino
15 July 2015
Red Clay, Outdoor

Albania
0

			1	2	3
1	(Georgia (country)) (Albania)	Aleksandre Metreveli; Arber Sulstarova	6; 0	6; 0
2	(Georgia (country)) (Albania)	Nikoloz Basilashvili; Rei Pelushi	6; 0	6; 0
3	(Georgia (country)) (Albania)	Giorgi Javakhishvili / George Tsivadze; Rei Pelushi / Genajd Shypheja	6; 0	6; 0

==== Malta vs. Iceland ====
Malta
3
Centro Tennis Cassa di Risparmio, San Marino, San Marino
15 July 2015
Red Clay, Outdoor

Iceland
0

			1	2	3
1	(Malta) (Iceland)	Matthew Asciak; Birkir Gunnarsson	6; 3	6; 2
2	(Malta) (Iceland)	Bernard Cassar Torregiani; Rafn Kumar Bonifacius	5; 7	7^{7} 6^{2}	6; 1
3	(Malta) (Iceland)	Matthew Asciak / Bradley Callus; Birkir Gunnarsson / Vladimir Ristic	6; 3	6; 3

==== Georgia vs. Iceland ====
Georgia
3
Centro Tennis Cassa di Risparmio, San Marino, San Marino
16 July 2015
Red Clay, Outdoor

Iceland
0

			1	2	3
1	(Georgia (country)) (Iceland)	Giorgi Javakhishvili; Birkir Gunnarsson	6; 0	6; 2
2	(Georgia (country)) (Iceland)	George Tsivadze; Vladimir Ristic	6; 3	6; 0
3	(Georgia (country)) (Iceland)	Giorgi Javakhishvili / George Tsivadze; Magnús Gunnarsson / Vladimir Ristic	6; 1	6; 3

==== Malta vs. Albania ====
Malta
3
Centro Tennis Cassa di Risparmio, San Marino, San Marino
16 July 2015
Red Clay, Outdoor

Albania
0

			1	2	3
1	(Malta) (Albania)	Matthew Asciak; Genajd Shypheja	6; 0	6; 0
2	(Malta) (Albania)	Bernard Cassar Torregiani; Rei Pelushi	6; 0	6; 3
3	(Malta) (Albania)	Bradley Callus / Matthew Cassar Torregiani; Rei Pelushi / Genajd Shypheja	6; 3	4; 6	6; 1

==== Georgia vs. Malta ====
Georgia
3
Centro Tennis Cassa di Risparmio, San Marino, San Marino
17 July 2015
Red Clay, Outdoor

Malta
0

			1	2	3
1	(Georgia (country)) (Malta)	Aleksandre Metreveli; Matthew Asciak	6; 1	6; 3
2	(Georgia (country)) (Malta)	Nikoloz Basilashvili; Bernard Cassar Torregiani	6; 1	6; 0
3	(Georgia (country)) (Malta)	Giorgi Javakhishvili / George Tsivadze; Bradley Callus / Bernard Cassar Torregiani	6; 2	6; 1

==== Albania vs. Iceland ====
Albania
0
Centro Tennis Cassa di Risparmio, San Marino, San Marino
17 July 2015
Red Clay, Outdoor

Iceland
3

			1	2	3
1	(Albania) (Iceland)	Genajd Shypheja; Birkir Gunnarsson	4; 6	5; 7
2	(Albania) (Iceland)	Rei Pelushi; Rafn Kumar Bonifacius	2; 6	0; 6
3	(Albania) (Iceland)	Rei Pelushi / Genajd Shypheja; Rafn Kumar Bonifacius / Birkir Gunnarsson	3; 6	2; 6

== Play-offs ==
=== Promotion ===
==== Cyprus vs. Norway ====
Cyprus
0
Centro Tennis Cassa di Risparmio, San Marino, San Marino
18 July 2015
Red Clay, Outdoor

Norway
2

			1	2	3
1	(Cyprus) (Norway)	Christos Hadjigeorgiou; Casper Ruud	1; 6	2; 6
2	(Cyprus) (Norway)	Petros Chrysochos; Viktor Durasovic	2; 6	3; 6
3	(Cyprus) (Norway)	Petros Chrysochos / Christos Hadjigeorgiou; Viktor Durasovic / Casper Ruud				not played

==== Estonia vs. Georgia ====
Estonia
0
Centro Tennis Cassa di Risparmio, San Marino, San Marino
18 July 2015
Red Clay, Outdoor

Georgia
2

			1	2	3
1	(Estonia) (Georgia (country))	Vladimir Ivanov; Aleksandre Metreveli	3; 6	6^{5} 7^{7}
2	(Estonia) (Georgia (country))	Jürgen Zopp; Nikoloz Basilashvili	6; 3	2; 6	4; 6
3	(Estonia) (Georgia (country))	Vladimir Ivanov / Jürgen Zopp; Nikoloz Basilashvili / Aleksandre Metreveli				not played

=== 5th to 8th play-offs ===
==== Greece vs. Macedonia ====
Greece
0
Centro Tennis Cassa di Risparmio, San Marino, San Marino
18 July 2015
Red Clay, Outdoor

Macedonia
2

			1	2	3
1	(Greece) (North Macedonia)	Christos Antonopoulos; Dimitar Grabul	4; 6	6^{2} 7^{7}
2	(Greece) (North Macedonia)	Eleftherios Theodorou; Tomislav Jotovski	2; 6	3; 6
3	(Greece) (North Macedonia)	Christos Antonopoulos / Ioannis Stergiou; Bojan Jankulovski / Tomislav Jotovski				not played

==== Montenegro vs. Malta ====
Montenegro
2
Centro Tennis Cassa di Risparmio, San Marino, San Marino
18 July 2015
Red Clay, Outdoor

Malta
1

			1	2	3
1	(Montenegro) (Malta)	Ivan Saveljić; Matthew Asciak	3; 6	2; 6
2	(Montenegro) (Malta)	Igor Saveljić; Bernard Cassar Torregiani	6; 1	6; 0
3	(Montenegro) (Malta)	Ljubomir Čelebić / Igor Saveljić; Matthew Asciak / Bradley Callus	6; 2	6; 2

=== 9th to 12th play-offs ===
==== San Marino vs. Armenia ====
San Marino
2
Centro Tennis Cassa di Risparmio, San Marino, San Marino
18 July 2015
Red Clay, Outdoor

Armenia
0

			1	2	3
1	(San Marino) (Armenia)	Pietro Grassi; Mikayel Avetisyan	6; 0	6; 1
2	(San Marino) (Armenia)	Marco De Rossi; Ashot Gevorgyan	6; 3	2; 6	6; 2
3	(San Marino) (Armenia)	Marco De Rossi / Domenico Vicini; Mikayel Khachatryan / Sedrak Khachatryan				not played

==== Liechtenstein vs. Iceland ====
Liechtenstein
2
Centro Tennis Cassa di Risparmio, San Marino, San Marino
18 July 2015
Red Clay, Outdoor

Iceland
1

			1	2	3
1	(Liechtenstein) (Iceland)	Gian-Carlo Besimo; Birkir Gunnarsson	2; 6	0; 6
2	(Liechtenstein) (Iceland)	Vital Flurin Leuch; Rafn Kumar Bonifacius	3; 6	6; 3	6; 2
3	(Liechtenstein) (Iceland)	Gian-Carlo Besimo / Vital Flurin Leuch; Rafn Kumar Bonifacius / Birkir Gunnarsson	6; 3	6; 4

== Outcomes ==
- Georgia and Norway are promoted to Europe/Africa Zone Group II in 2016
- The remaining eleven nations remain in Europe Zone Group III in 2016
