= Igor Saveljić =

Montenegrin tennis player

- Country (sports): Montenegro
- Born: 17 August 1995 (age 30) Podgorica, FR Yugoslavia
- Height: 1.93 m (6 ft 4 in)
- Plays: Right-handed (two-handed backhand)
- College: NC State
- Prize money: $5,225

Singles
- Career record: 0–0 (at ATP Tour level, Grand Slam level, and in Davis Cup)
- Career titles: 0
- Highest ranking: No. 1,340 (13 July 2015)
- Current ranking: No. 1,527 (28 September 2020)

Doubles
- Career record: 0–0 (at ATP Tour level, Grand Slam level, and in Davis Cup)
- Career titles: 0
- Highest ranking: No. 1,183 (16 March 2020)
- Current ranking: No. 1,193 (28 September 2020)

Team competitions
- Davis Cup: 9–10
- Last updated on: 28 September 2020.

Igor Saveljić (born 17 August 1995) is a Montenegrin tennis player.

Saveljić has a career high ATP singles ranking of 1340 achieved on 13 July 2015. He also has a career high ATP doubles ranking of 1183 achieved on 16 March 2020.

Saveljić represents Montenegro at the Davis Cup, where he has a W/L record of 9–10.

== Doubles 1 (0–1) ==
Legend (doubles) ATP Challenger Tour (0–0) ITF World Tennis Tour (0–1)	Titles by surface Hard (0–1) Clay (0–0) Grass (0–0) Carpet (0–0)

Result	W–L	Date	Tournament	Tier	Surface	Partner	Opponents	Score
Loss	0–1	Mar 2020	M15 Heraklion, Greece	World Tennis Tour	Hard	(Montenegro) Ljubomir Čelebić	(Germany) Constantin Schmitz (Germany) Kai Wehnelt	6–2, 4–6, [9–11]

== Davis Cup ==
=== Participations: (9–10) ===
Group membership World Group (0–0) WG Play-off (0–0) Group I (0–0) Group II (0–0) Group III (9–10) Group IV (0–0)	Matches by surface Hard (0–0) Clay (9–10) Grass (0–0) Carpet (0–0)	Matches by type Singles (5–4) Doubles (4–6)

- ▲ ▼ indicates the outcome of the Davis Cup match followed by the score, date, place of event, the zonal classification and its phase, and the court surface.

Rubber outcome	No.	Rubber	Match type (partner if any)	Opponent nation	Opponent player(s)	Score
▼1–2; 3 May 2012; Carlsberg Bulgarian National Tennis Center, Sofia, Bulgaria; Europe Zone Group III Pool C Round robin; Clay surface
Defeat	1	I	Singles	Armenia	Daniil Proskura	3–6, 6–4, 2–6
Defeat	2	III	Doubles (with Ljubomir Čelebić)	Armenia	Khachatur Khachatryan / Daniil Proskura	1–6, 6–7^{(8–10)}
▼0–2; 4 May 2012; Carlsberg Bulgarian National Tennis Center, Sofia, Bulgaria; Europe Zone Group III Pool C Round robin; Clay surface
Defeat	3	I	Singles	(North Macedonia) Macedonia	Shendrit Deari	0–6, 1–6
▼0–3; 22 May 2013; Centro Tennis Cassa di Risaprmio della Repubblica di San Marino, City of San Marino, San Marino; Europe Zone Group III Pool A Round robin; Clay surface
Defeat	4	III	Doubles (with Ivan Saveljić) (dead rubber)	Greece	Charalampos Kapogiannis / Konstantinos Mikos	2–6, 4–6
▲2–1; 24 May 2013; Centro Tennis Cassa di Risaprmio della Repubblica di San Marino, City of San Marino, San Marino; Europe Zone Group III Pool A Round robin; Clay surface
Victory	5	I	Singles	Liechtenstein	Timo Kranz	7–5, 6–3
1–1; 25 May 2013; Centro Tennis Cassa di Risaprmio della Repubblica di San Marino, City of San Marino, San Marino; Europe Zone Group III 5th-8th Playoff; Clay surface
Victory	6	II	Singles	San Marino	Diego Zonzini	6–2, 6–2
▼0–3; 7 May 2014; Gellért Leisure Centre, Szeged, Hungary; Europe Zone Group III Pool C Round robin; Clay surface
Defeat	7	I	Singles	(Georgia (country)) Georgia	George Tsivadze	0–6, 2–6
Defeat	8	III	Doubles (with Ivan Saveljić) (dead rubber)	(Georgia (country)) Georgia	Aleksandre Metreveli / George Tsivadze	5–7, 6–2, 4–6
▲3–0; 9 May 2014; Gellért Leisure Centre, Szeged, Hungary; Europe Zone Group III Pool C Round robin; Clay surface
Victory	9	I	Singles	Iceland	Raj-Kumar Bonifacius	6–1, 6–2
▲3–0; 10 May 2014; Gellért Leisure Centre, Szeged, Hungary; Europe Zone Group III 5th-8th Playoff; Clay surface
Victory	10	III	Doubles (with Ivan Saveljić) (dead rubber)	Liechtenstein	Vital Flurin Leuch / Christian Meier	6–2, 6–3
▲3–0; 16 July 2015; Centro Tennis Cassa di Risaprmio della Repubblica di San Marino, City of San Marino, San Marino; Europe Zone Group III Pool B Round robin; Clay surface
Victory	11	I	Singles	Liechtenstein	Gian-Carlo Besimo	7–5, 6–1
Victory	12	III	Doubles (with Ivan Saveljić) (dead rubber)	Liechtenstein	Gian-Carlo Besimo / Vital Flurin Leuch	6–3, 7–5
▼0–3; 17 July 2015; Centro Tennis Cassa di Risaprmio della Repubblica di San Marino, City of San Marino, San Marino; Europe Zone Group III Pool B Round robin; Clay surface
Defeat	13	I	Singles	Estonia	Vladimir Ivanov	2–6, 3–6
▲2–1; 18 July 2015; Centro Tennis Cassa di Risaprmio della Repubblica di San Marino, City of San Marino, San Marino; Europe Zone Group III 5th-8th Playoff; Clay surface
Victory	14	I	Singles	Malta	Bernard Cassar Torregiani	6–1, 6–0
Victory	15	III	Doubles (with Ljubomir Čelebić)	Malta	Matthew Asciak / Bradley Callus	6–2, 6–2
▼0–3; 11 September 2019; TATOI Club, Athens, Greece; Europe Zone Group III Pool B; Clay surface
Defeat	16	III	Doubles (with Rrezart Cungu) (dead rubber)	Latvia	Artūrs Lazdiņš / Jānis Podžus	3–6, 4–6
▼0–3; 12 September 2019; TATOI Club, Athens, Greece; Europe Zone Group III Pool B; Clay surface
Defeat	17	III	Doubles (with Mario Aleksić) (dead rubber)	Estonia	Vladimir Ivanov / Kenneth Raisma	7–6^{(7–5)}, 2–6, 4–6
▲3–0; 13 September 2019; TATOI Club, Athens, Greece; Europe Zone Group III Pool B; Clay surface
Victory	18	III	Doubles (with Mario Aleksić) (dead rubber)	North Macedonia	Luka Ljuben Andonov / Berk Bugarikj	7–6^{(7–3)}, 6–0
▼1–2; 14 September 2019; TATOI Club, Athens, Greece; Europe Zone Group III 7th-8th Playoff; Clay surface
Defeat	19	III	Doubles (with Ljubomir Čelebić)	Luxembourg	Ugo Nastasi / Chris Rodesch	3–6, 6–2, 4–6
