= 2014 Davis Cup Europe Zone Group III =

International tennis competition

The Europe Zone was one of the four zones within Group 3 of the regional Davis Cup competition in 2014. The zone's competition was held in round robin format in Gellért Szabadidőközpont, Szeged, Hungary, May 7–10, on outdoor clay courts. The twelve competing nations were divided into four pools of three. The winners from each pool played off to determine the two nations to be promoted to Europe/Africa Zone Group II in 2015, while the second and third placed nations played to off to determine overall placings within the group.

== Participating nations ==
- Albania
- Armenia
- Estonia
- Georgia
- Hungary
- Iceland
- Liechtenstein
- Macedonia
- Malta
- Montenegro
- San Marino
- Turkey

== Draw ==
The twelve teams were divided into four pools of three. The winner of Pool A plays off against the winner of Pool C, and the winner of Pool B plays off against the winner of Pool D. The two winners of these play-offs are promoted to Europe/Africa Zone Group II in 2015. The second and third placed teams in each pool play off in the same pattern to determine overall rankings within the group.

Pool A

	Hungary	Liechtenstein	Armenia	RR W–L	Matches W–L	Sets W–L	Games W–L	Standings
Hungary		3–0	3–0	2–0	6–0	12–0	72–11	1
Liechtenstein	0–3		2–1	1–1	2–4	5–8	41–66	2
Armenia	0–3	1–2		0–2	1–5	2–11	36–72	3

Pool B

	Macedonia	Malta	Albania	RR W–L	Matches W–L	Sets W–L	Games W–L	Standings
Macedonia		3–0	3–0	2–0	6–0	12–0	72–18	1
Malta	0–3		3–0	1–1	3–3	6–6	48–45	2
Albania	0–3	0–3		0–2	0–6	0–12	15–72	3

Pool C

	Georgia	Montenegro	Iceland	RR W–L	Matches W–L	Sets W–L	Games W–L	Standings
Georgia		3–0	3–0	2–0	6–0	12–1	75–30	1
Montenegro	0–3		3–0	1–1	3–3	7–6	59–44	2
Iceland	0–3	0–3		0–2	0–6	0–12	12–72	3

Pool D

	Turkey	Estonia	San Marino	RR W–L	Matches W–L	Sets W–L	Games W–L	Standings
Turkey		2–1	3–0	2–0	5–1	11–2	73–41	1
Estonia	1–2		3–0	1–1	4–2	8–5	67–52	2
San Marino	0–3	0–3		0–2	0–6	0–12	25–72	3

== First round ==
=== Pool A ===
==== Hungary vs. Armenia ====
Hungary
3
Gellért Szabadidőközpont, Szeged, Hungary
7 May 2014
Clay

Armenia
0

			1	2	3
1	(Hungary) (Armenia)	Gergely Madarász; Ashot Gevorgyan	6; 0	6; 3
2	(Hungary) (Armenia)	Márton Fucsovics; Mikayel Avetisyan	6; 0	6; 1
3	(Hungary) (Armenia)	Márton Fucsovics / Levente Gödry; Ashot Gevorgyan / Sedrak Khachatryan	6; 2	6; 0

==== Hungary vs. Liechtenstein ====
Hungary
3
Gellért Szabadidőközpont, Szeged, Hungary
8 May 2014
Clay

Liechtenstein
0

			1	2	3
1	(Hungary) (Liechtenstein)	Gergely Madarász; Timo Kranz	6; 3	6; 1
2	(Hungary) (Liechtenstein)	Márton Fucsovics; Vital Flurin Leuch	6; 0	6; 1
3	(Hungary) (Liechtenstein)	Viktor Filipenkó / Levente Gödry; Robin Forster / Christian Meier	6; 0	6; 0

==== Armenia vs. Liechtenstein ====
Armenia
1
Gellért Szabadidőközpont, Szeged, Hungary
9 May 2014
Clay

Liechtenstein
2

			1	2	3
1	(Armenia) (Liechtenstein)	Ashot Gevorgyan; Timo Kranz	1; 6	2; 6
2	(Armenia) (Liechtenstein)	Sedrak Khachatryan; Vital Flurin Leuch	4; 6	6; 2	6; 2
3	(Armenia) (Liechtenstein)	Ashot Gevorgyan / Sedrak Khachatryan; Timo Kranz / Vital Flurin Leuch	5; 7	6^{6} 7^{8}

=== Pool B ===
==== Macedonia vs. Malta ====
Macedonia
3
Gellért Szabadidőközpont, Szeged, Hungary
7 May 2014
Clay

Malta
0

			1	2	3
1	(North Macedonia) (Malta)	Tomislav Jotovski; Matthew Asciak	6; 3	6; 1
2	(North Macedonia) (Malta)	Dimitar Grabul; Bernard Cassar Torregiani	6; 2	6; 2
3	(North Macedonia) (Malta)	Shendrit Deari / Dimitar Grabul; Bradley Callus / Bernard Cassar Torregiani	6; 2	6; 2

==== Macedonia vs. Albania ====
Macedonia
3
Gellért Szabadidőközpont, Szeged, Hungary
8 May 2014
Clay

Albania
0

			1	2	3
1	(North Macedonia) (Albania)	Shendrit Deari; Arber Sulstarova	6; 2	6; 1
2	(North Macedonia) (Albania)	Dimitar Grabul; Genajd Shypheja	6; 0	6; 1
3	(North Macedonia) (Albania)	Bojan Jankulovski / Tomislav Jotovski; Rei Pelushi / Genajd Shypheja	6; 0	6; 2

==== Malta vs. Albania ====
Malta
3
Gellért Szabadidőközpont, Szeged, Hungary
9 May 2014
Clay

Albania
0

			1	2	3
1	(Malta) (Albania)	Bradley Callus; Genajd Shypheja	6; 1	6; 4
2	(Malta) (Albania)	Matthew Asciak; Rei Pelushi	6; 0	6; 1
3	(Malta) (Albania)	Denzil Agius / Matthew Asciak; Rei Pelushi / Genajd Shypheja	6; 2	6; 1

=== Pool C ===
==== Georgia vs. Montenegro ====
Georgia
3
Gellért Szabadidőközpont, Szeged, Hungary
7 May 2014
Clay

Montenegro
0

			1	2	3
1	(Georgia (country)) (Montenegro)	George Tsivadze; Igor Saveljić	6; 0	6; 2
2	(Georgia (country)) (Montenegro)	Aleksandre Metreveli; Ljubomir Čelebić	6; 3	6; 3
3	(Georgia (country)) (Montenegro)	Aleksandre Metreveli / George Tsivadze; Igor Saveljić / Ivan Saveljić	7; 5	2; 6	6; 4

==== Georgia vs. Iceland ====
Georgia
3
Gellért Szabadidőközpont, Szeged, Hungary
8 May 2014
Clay

Iceland
0

			1	2	3
1	(Georgia (country)) (Iceland)	Aleksandre Bakshi; Raj-Kumar Bonifacius	6; 2	6; 2
2	(Georgia (country)) (Iceland)	Giorgi Javakhishvili; Magnús Gunnarsson	6; 0	6; 1
3	(Georgia (country)) (Iceland)	Aleksandre Bakshi / Giorgi Javakhishvili; Raj-Kumar Bonifacius / Hinrik Helgason	6; 0	6; 2

==== Montenegro vs. Iceland ====
Montenegro
3
Gellért Szabadidőközpont, Szeged, Hungary
9 May 2014
Clay

Iceland
0

			1	2	3
1	(Montenegro) (Iceland)	Igor Saveljić; Raj-Kumar Bonifacius	6; 1	6; 2
2	(Montenegro) (Iceland)	Ljubomir Čelebić; Hinrik Helgason	6; 1	6; 0
3	(Montenegro) (Iceland)	Ljubomir Čelebić / Pavle Rogan; Magnús Gunnarsson / Hinrik Helgason	6; 0	6; 1

=== Pool D ===
==== Estonia vs. Turkey ====
Estonia
1
Gellért Szabadidőközpont, Szeged, Hungary
7 May 2014
Clay

Turkey
2

			1	2	3
1	(Estonia) (Turkey)	Mikk Irdoja; Cem İlkel	3; 6	6; 2	6; 4
2	(Estonia) (Turkey)	Vladimir Ivanov; Marsel İlhan	4; 6	6^{3} 7^{7}
3	(Estonia) (Turkey)	Mikk Irdoja / Vladimir Ivanov; Barış Ergüden / Marsel İlhan	3; 6	3; 6

==== Turkey vs. San Marino ====
Turkey
3
Gellért Szabadidőközpont, Szeged, Hungary
8 May 2014
Clay

San Marino
0

			1	2	3
1	(Turkey) (San Marino)	Barış Ergüden; Diego Zonzini	6; 1	6; 3
2	(Turkey) (San Marino)	Marsel İlhan; Marco De Rossi	6; 2	6; 1
3	(Turkey) (San Marino)	Cem İlkel / Anıl Yüksel; Marco De Rossi / Domenico Vicini	6; 1	6; 2

==== Estonia vs. San Marino ====
Estonia
3
Gellért Szabadidőközpont, Szeged, Hungary
9 May 2014
Clay

San Marino
0

			1	2	3
1	(Estonia) (San Marino)	Kenneth Raisma; Diego Zonzini	6; 3	6; 2
2	(Estonia) (San Marino)	Vladimir Ivanov; Marco De Rossi	6; 3	6; 1
3	(Estonia) (San Marino)	Mikk Irdoja / Anton Pavlov; Marco De Rossi / Domenico Vicini	6; 3	6; 3

== Play-offs ==
=== Promotion ===
==== Hungary vs. Georgia ====
Hungary
2
Gellért Szabadidőközpont, Szeged, Hungary
10 May 2014
Clay

Georgia
0

			1	2	3
1	(Hungary) (Georgia (country))	Gergely Madarász; George Tsivadze	7; 5	6; 0
2	(Hungary) (Georgia (country))	Márton Fucsovics; Aleksandre Metreveli	6; 1	6; 1
3	(Hungary) (Georgia (country))	Márton Fucsovics / Levente Gödry; Aleksandre Metreveli / George Tsivadze				not played

==== Macedonia vs. Turkey ====
Macedonia
0
Gellért Szabadidőközpont, Szeged, Hungary
10 May 2014
Clay

Turkey
2

			1	2	3
1	(North Macedonia) (Turkey)	Tomislav Jotovski; Cem İlkel	4; 6	7^{7} 6^{2}	4; 6
2	(North Macedonia) (Turkey)	Dimitar Grabul; Marsel İlhan	5; 7	6; 3	4; 6
3	(North Macedonia) (Turkey)	Dimitar Grabul / Tomislav Jotovski; Barış Ergüden / Marsel İlhan				not played

=== 5th to 8th play-offs ===
==== Liechtenstein vs. Montenegro ====
Liechtenstein
0
Gellért Szabadidőközpont, Szeged, Hungary
10 May 2014
Clay

Montenegro
3

			1	2	3
1	(Liechtenstein) (Montenegro)	Timo Kranz; Pavle Rogan	3; 6	5; 7
2	(Liechtenstein) (Montenegro)	Vital Flurin Leuch; Ljubomir Čelebić	1; 6	0; 6
3	(Liechtenstein) (Montenegro)	Vital Flurin Leuch / Christian Meier; Igor Saveljić / Ivan Saveljić	2; 6	3; 6

==== Malta vs. Estonia ====
Malta
1
Gellért Szabadidőközpont, Szeged, Hungary
10 May 2014
Clay

Estonia
2

			1	2	3
1	(Malta) (Estonia)	Matthew Asciak; Anton Pavlov	6; 2	6; 1
2	(Malta) (Estonia)	Bernard Cassar Torregiani; Vladimir Ivanov	5; 7	1; 6
3	(Malta) (Estonia)	Matthew Asciak / Bernard Cassar Torregiani; Mikk Irdoja / Vladimir Ivanov	4; 6	3; 6

=== 9th to 12th play-offs ===
==== Armenia vs. Iceland ====
Armenia
2
Gellért Szabadidőközpont, Szeged, Hungary
10 May 2014
Clay

Iceland
0

			1	2	3
1	(Armenia) (Iceland)	Ashot Gevorgyan; Magnús Gunnarsson	6; 0	6; 0
2	(Armenia) (Iceland)	Mikayel Avetisyan; Hinrik Helgason	6; 2	6; 1
3	(Armenia) (Iceland)	Sedrak Khachatryan / Karen Uzunyan; Magnús Gunnarsson / Hinrik Helgason				not played

==== Albania vs. San Marino ====
Albania
0
Gellért Szabadidőközpont, Szeged, Hungary
10 May 2014
Clay

San Marino
3

			1	2	3
1	(Albania) (San Marino)	Arber Sulstarova; Domenico Vicini	1; 6	1; 6
2	(Albania) (San Marino)	Genajd Shypheja; Marco De Rossi	1; 6	3; 6
3	(Albania) (San Marino)	Genajd Shypheja / Arber Sulstarova; Domenico Vicini / Giacomo Zonzini	1; 6	2; 6

== Final standings ==
Rank	Team
1	Hungary
1	Turkey
3	Georgia
3	Macedonia
5	Estonia
5	Montenegro
7	Liechtenstein
7	Malta
9	Armenia
9	San Marino
11	Albania
11	Iceland

- Hungary and Turkey were promoted to Europe/Africa Zone Group II in 2015.
