= Tomislav Jotovski =

Macedonian tennis player (born 1990)

Tomislav Jotovski Томислав Јотовски
- Country (sports): North Macedonia
- Born: 27 October 1990 (age 35) Skopje, Macedonia, Yugoslavia
- Plays: Left-handed (two-handed backhand)
- Prize money: $61,925

Singles
- Career record: 11–13 (at ATP Tour level, Grand Slam level, and in Davis Cup)
- Career titles: 0; 0 Challenger, 1 Futures
- Highest ranking: No. 510 (15 June 2015)

Doubles
- Career record: 3–4 (at ATP Tour level, Grand Slam level, and in Davis Cup)
- Career titles: 0; 0 Challenger, 6 Futures
- Highest ranking: No. 541 (26 September 2016)

Team competitions
- Davis Cup: 14–13
- Last updated on: 27 May 2019.

Tomislav Jotovski (Macedonian: Томислав Јотовски; born 27 October 1990) is a Macedonian tennis player.

Jotovski has a career high ATP singles ranking of 510 achieved on 15 June 2015. He also has a career high ATP doubles ranking of 541, achieved on 26 September 2016. Jotovski's biggest singles title is 2017 Georgia F2 Futures (CL) with $15,000 prize money. Jotovski has also won 6 ITF doubles titles.

Jotovski has represented Macedonia at Davis Cup, where he has a win–loss record of 14–13.

== Future and Challenger finals ==
=== Singles: 5 (1–4) ===
Legend
Challengers 0 (0–0)
Futures 5 (1–4)

Outcome	No.	Date	Tournament	Surface	Opponent	Score
Runner-up	1.	July 27, 2014	Valjevo, Serbia F6	Clay	(France) Maxime Janvier	6–7^{(4–7)}, 6–7^{(6–8)}
Runner-up	2.	September 14, 2014	Subotica, Serbia F12	Clay	(Serbia) Dejan Katić	4–6, 2–6
Runner-up	3.	May 30, 2015	Brčko, Bosnia and Herzegovina F3	Clay	(Slovenia) Tom Kočevar-Dešman	1–6, 2–6
Runner-up	4.	August 2, 2015	Tunis, Tunisia F16	Clay	(Chile) Cristóbal Saavedra Corvalán	6–7^{(7–9)}, 6–3, 4–6
Winner	5.	July 15, 2017	Telavi, Georgia F2	Clay	(Spain) Guillermo Olaso	7–6^{(7–3)}, 6–7^{(7–9)}, 7–6^{(7–4)}

=== Doubles 17 (6–11) ===
Legend
Challengers 0 (0–0)
Futures 17 (6–11)

Outcome	No.	Date	Tournament	Surface	Partner	Opponents	Score
Runner-up	1.	August 15, 2009	Sombor, Serbia F5	Clay	(North Macedonia) Dimitar Grabul	(Serbia) Vladimir Obradović (Serbia) Aleksander Slović	5–7, 2–6
Runner-up	2.	August 29, 2010	Burgas, Bulgaria F5	Clay	(Serbia) Miljan Zekić	(Argentina) Diego Álvarez (Italy) Federico Torresi	4–6, 2–6
Runner-up	3.	September 25, 2011	Sokobanja, Serbia F12	Clay	(North Macedonia) Stefan Micov	(Russia) Stepan Khotulev (Japan) Takuto Niki	5–7, 3–6
Runner-up	4.	September 30, 2012	Sokobanja, Serbia F14	Clay	(North Macedonia) Shendrit Deari	(Serbia) Ivan Bjelica (Bosnia and Herzegovina) Aldin Šetkić	2–6, 0–6
Winner	5.	December 1, 2013	Sharm El Sheikh, Egypt F34	Clay	(Serbia) Peđa Krstin	(France) Melik Feler (Burundi) Hassan Ndayishimiye	6–2, 6–3
Runner-up	6.	June 1, 2014	Sharm El Sheikh, Egypt F19	Clay	(North Macedonia) Shendrit Deari	(Argentina) Sebastian Exequiel Pini (Argentina) Leandro Portmann	0–6, 6–7^{(3–7)}
Winner	7.	June 22, 2014	Stara Zagora, Bulgaria F2	Clay	(Bosnia and Herzegovina) Nerman Fatić	(Czech Republic) Jan Blecha (Bulgaria) Alexandar Lazov	7–5, 6–2
Runner-up	8.	September 21, 2014	Niš, Serbia F13	Clay	(North Macedonia) Dimitar Grabul	(Croatia) Ivan Sabanov (Croatia) Matej Sabanov	4–6, 2–6
Runner-up	9.	November 30, 2014	Kish, Iran F11	Clay	(Croatia) Duje Kekez	(Spain) Marc Fornell Mestres (Spain) Marco Neubau	4–6, 4–6
Winner	10.	June 28, 2015	Šabac, Serbia F3	Clay	(Serbia) Miljan Zekić	(France) Florent Diep (France) François-Arthur Vibert	6–7^{(4–7)}, 6–0, [10–4]
Winner	11.	September 27, 2015	Sokobanja, Serbia F13	Clay	(Bulgaria) Alexandar Lazov	(Germany) Bogdan Djurdjevic (Spain) Enric Guaita-Pais	4–6, 6–4, [10–6]
Runner-up	12.	January 24, 2016	Hammamet, Tunisia F2	Clay	(Serbia) Miljan Zekić	(Sweden) Markus Eriksson (Italy) Matteo Volante	2–6, 1–6
Winner	13.	June 25, 2016	Skopje, Macedonia F1	Clay	(Bulgaria) Alexandar Lazov	(Serbia) Nebojša Perić (Serbia) Danilo Petrović	6–3, 6–2
Winner	14.	July 3, 2016	Skopje, Macedonia F2	Clay	(Bulgaria) Alexandar Lazov	(Czech Republic) Libor Salaba (Croatia) Nino Serdarušić	6–2, 3–6, [10–6]
Runner-up	15.	July 10, 2016	Skopje, Macedonia F3	Clay	(North Macedonia) Predrag Rusevski	(United Kingdom) Richard Gabb (United Kingdom) Neil Pauffley	4–6, 4–6
Runner-up	16.	May 27, 2017	Doboj, Bosnia and Herzegovina F2	Clay	(Serbia) Milan Radojković	(Argentina) Franco Agamenone (Brazil) Thales Turini	3–6, 2–6
Runner-up	17.	March 25, 2018	Hammamet, Tunisia F11	Clay	(Croatia) Duje Kekez	(Ecuador) Diego Hidalgo (Argentina) Mariano Kestelboim	3–6, 7–6^{(7–2)}, [5–10]

=== Davis Cup (14 wins, 13 losses) ===
Jotovski debuted for the Macedonia Davis Cup team in the 2008 season and has played 27 matches in 22 ties. His singles record is 11–10 and his doubles record is 3–3 (14–13 overall).

Group membership World Group (0–0) WG Play-off (0–0) Group I (0–2) Group II (0–1) Group III (14–10) Group IV (0–0)	Matches by surface Hard (7–5) Clay (7–8) Grass (0–0) Carpet (0–0)	Matches by type Singles (11–10) Doubles (3–3)	Matches by setting Indoors (i) (0–2) Outdoors (14–11)

- ▲ ▼ indicates the result of the Davis Cup match followed by the score, date, place of event, the zonal classification and its phase, and the court surface.

Rubber result	Rubber	Match type (partner if any)	Opponent nation	Opponent player(s)	Score
▲4–1; 8–10 February 2008; Jane Sandanski Arena, Skopje, Macedonia; Group I Europe/Africa First round; Clay (i) surface
Defeat	V	Singles (dead rubber)	Latvia	Deniss Pavlovs	2–6, 2–6
▼0–5; 18–20 September 2009; Sibamac Arena, Bratislava, Slovakia; Group I Europe/Africa Relegation play-off; Hard (i) surface
Defeat	V	Singles (dead rubber)	Slovakia	Dominik Hrbatý	0–6, 0–6
▼1–4; 9–11 July 2010; Gödöllő Kiskastély, Gödöllő, Hungary; Group II Europe/Africa Relegation play-off; Clay surface
Defeat	V	Singles (dead rubber)	Hungary	György Balázs	0–6, 1–6
▲3–0; 11 May 2011; Tennis Club Jug-Skopje, Skopje, Macedonia; Group III Europe Round Robin; Clay surface
Victory	II	Singles	San Marino	Alberto Brighi	6–1, 6–0
▲2–1; 13 May 2011; Tennis Club Jug-Skopje, Skopje, Macedonia; Group III Europe Round Robin; Clay surface
Defeat	II	Singles	Andorra	Jean-Baptiste Poux-Gautier	4–6, 2–6
▼0–2; 14 May 2011; Tennis Club Jug-Skopje, Skopje, Macedonia; Group III Europe Promotional play-off; Clay surface
Defeat	II	Singles	Turkey	Marsel İlhan	1–6, 1–6
▲3–0; 2 May 2012; Bulgarian National Tennis Centre, Sofia, Bulgaria; Group III Europe Round Robin; Clay surface
Victory	II	Singles	Armenia	Ashot Gevorgyan	3–6, 6–2, 6–0
▲2–0; 2 May 2012; Bulgarian National Tennis Centre, Sofia, Bulgaria; Group III Europe Round Robin; Clay surface
Victory	II	Singles	Montenegro	Ljubomir Čelebić	6–2, 6–3
▼0–3; 5 May 2012; Bulgarian National Tennis Centre, Sofia, Bulgaria; Group III Europe Promotional play-off; Clay surface
Defeat	II	Singles	Bulgaria	Grigor Dimitrov	0–6, 0–6
Defeat	III	Doubles (with Danil Zelenkov) (dead rubber)	Bulgaria	Todor Enev / Petar Trendafilov	3–6, 3–6
▲3–0; 7 May 2014; Gellért Szabadidőközpont, Szeged, Hungary; Group III Europe Round Robin; Clay surface
Victory	I	Singles	Malta	Matthew Asciak	6–3, 6–1
▲3–0; 8 May 2014; Gellért Szabadidőközpont, Szeged, Hungary; Group III Europe Round Robin; Clay surface
Victory	III	Doubles (with Bojan Jankulovski) (dead rubber)	Albania	Rei Pelushi / Genajd Shypheja	6–0, 6–2
▼0–2; 10 May 2014; Gellért Szabadidőközpont, Szeged, Hungary; Group III Europe Promotional play-off; Clay surface
Defeat	I	Singles	Turkey	Cem İlkel	4–6, 7–6^{(7–2)}, 4–6
▲3–0; 15 July 2015; City of San Marino, San Marino; Group III Europe Round Robin; Clay surface
Victory	II	Singles	Armenia	Mikayel Avetisyan	6–0, 6–1
▼0–3; 17 July 2015; City of San Marino, San Marino; Group III Europe Round Robin; Clay surface
Defeat	II	Singles	Norway	Viktor Durasovic	6–4, 3–6, 6–7^{(7–9)}
▲2–0; 18 July 2015; City of San Marino, San Marino; Group III Europe 5th-8th place play-off; Clay surface
Victory	II	Singles	Greece	Eleftherios Theodorou	6–2, 6–3
▲3–0; 2 March 2016; Tere Tennis Centre, Tallinn, Estonia; Group III Europe Round Robin; Hard (i) surface
Victory	II	Singles	Armenia	Mikayel Avetisyan	6–4, 6–2
Victory	III	Doubles (with Dimitar Grabul) (dead rubber)	Armenia	Mikayel Avetisyan / Henrik Nikoghosyan	6–1, 6–4
▲3–0; 3 March 2016; Tere Tennis Centre, Tallinn, Estonia; Group III Europe Round Robin; Hard (i) surface
Victory	II	Singles	Albania	Genajd Shypheja	6–0, 6–0
Victory	III	Doubles (with Gorazd Srbljak) (dead rubber)	Albania	Genajd Shypheja / Arber Sulstarova	6–0, 6–3
▼1–2; 4 March 2016; Tere Tennis Centre, Tallinn, Estonia; Group III Europe Round Robin; Hard (i) surface
Defeat	II	Singles	(Republic of Ireland) Ireland	Sam Barry	3–6, 4–6
Defeat	III	Doubles (with Dimitar Grabul)	(Republic of Ireland) Ireland	Sam Barry / David O'Hare	3–6, 2–6
▲2–1; 6 April 2017; Holiday Village Santa Marina, Sozopol, Bulgaria; Group III Europe Round Robin; Hard surface
Defeat	II	Singles	Malta	Matthew Asciak	3–6, 6–3, 2–6
▲3–0; 7 April 2017; Holiday Village Santa Marina, Sozopol, Bulgaria; Group III Europe Round Robin; Hard surface
Victory	II	Singles	Iceland	Birkir Gunnarsson	6–0, 6–1
▲2–1; 8 April 2017; Holiday Village Santa Marina, Sozopol, Bulgaria; Group III Europe Round Robin; Hard surface
Victory	II	Singles	Moldova	Andrei Ciumac	6–3, 6–2
▼1–2; 8 April 2017; Holiday Village Santa Marina, Sozopol, Bulgaria; Group III Europe Promotional play-off; Hard surface
Victory	II	Singles	Luxembourg	Christophe Tholl	6–2, 6–2
Defeat	III	Doubles (with Dimitar Grabul)	Luxembourg	Alex Knaff / Ugo Nastasi	5–7, 6–4, 2–6
