= Albania Davis Cup team =

National tennis team

Albania
- Captain: Genajd Shypheja
- ITF ranking: 127 ▼1 (6 December 2021)
- First year: 2010
- Years played: 11
- Ties played (W–L): 41 (3–38)
- Most total wins: Elbi Mjeshtri (5–13)
- Most singles wins: Elbi Mjeshtri (3–7)
- Most doubles wins: Elbi Mjeshtri (2–6)
- Best doubles team: Elbi Mjeshtri / Daniel Ostap (1–1); Flavio Deçe / Rei Pelushi (1–2); Elbi Mjeshtri / Genajd Shypheja (1–5)
- Most ties played: Genajd Shypheja (26)
- Most years played: Genajd Shypheja (8)

The Albania Davis Cup team represents Albania in Davis Cup tennis competition and are governed by the Albanian Tennis Federation.

Albania currently compete in the Europe Zone Group IV, and have been doing so since the 2019 edition. Previously The Albanian Davis Cup team competed in Europe Zone Group III before alterations were made to the Davis Cup format. They first started competing in the Davis Cup competition in 2010.

== Players ==
| Player (Note: Active players in boldface) | W-L (Total) | W-L (Singles) | W-L (Doubles) | Ties | Debut | Ref |
|---|---|---|---|---|---|---|
| Genci Cakciri | 0–5 | 0–1 | 0–4 | 5 | 2010 | |
| Flavio Deçe | 3–25 | 2–16 | 1–9 | 19 | 2010 | |
| Rajan Dushi | 0–4 | 0–3 | 0–1 | 3 | 2019 | |
| Nermin Hoxhiq | 0–2 | 0–1 | 0–1 | 2 | 2022 | |
| Martin Hysenbegasi | 0–2 | 0–1 | 0–1 | 2 | 2010 | |
| Ferat Istrefi | 1–9 | 1–4 | 0–5 | 8 | 2010 | |
| Kevi Kaceli | 0–2 | 0–0 | 0–2 | 2 | 2013 | |
| Elbi Mjeshtri | 5–13 | 3–7 | 2–6 | 13 | 2017 | |
| Martin Muedini | 1–7 | 1–3 | 0–4 | 7 | 2019 | |
| Daniel Ostap | 1–4 | 0–2 | 1–2 | 3 | 2021 | |
| Rei Pelushi | 1–16 | 0–7 | 1–9 | 12 | 2012 | |
| Genajd Shypheja | 2–33 | 1–12 | 1–21 | 28 | 2012 | |
| Ivo Spathari | 0–3 | 0–2 | 0–1 | 2 | 2011 | |
| Arber Sulstarova | 0–14 | 0–10 | 0–4 | 13 | 2012 | |
| Mario Zili | 1–6 | 1–5 | 0–1 | 7 | 2016 | |

== Recent performances ==
^{(i)} = Played on an indoor court

=== 2010s ===
| Year | Competition | Date | Surface | Venue | Opponent | Score | Result |
|---|---|---|---|---|---|---|---|
| 2010 | Europe Zone Group III, Group B | 10 May | Hard | Olympic Tennis Center, Marousi (GRE) | Greece | 0–3 | Loss |
| 2010 | Europe Zone Group III, Group B | 11 May | Hard | Olympic Tennis Center, Marousi (GRE) | Moldova | 0–3 | Loss |
| 2010 | Europe Zone Group III, Group B | 12 May | Hard | Olympic Tennis Center, Marousi (GRE) | Montenegro | 0–3 | Loss |
| 2010 | Europe Zone Group III, Group B | 13 May | Hard | Olympic Tennis Center, Marousi (GRE) | Armenia | 0–3 | Loss |
| 2010 | Europe Zone Group III, Group B | 14 May | Hard | Olympic Tennis Center, Marousi (GRE) | San Marino | 0–3 | Loss |
| 2011 | Europe Zone Group III, Group B | 11 May | Clay | Tennis Club Jug-Skopje, Skopje (MKD) | Turkey | 0–3 | Loss |
| 2011 | Europe Zone Group III, Group B | 12 May | Clay | Tennis Club Jug-Skopje, Skopje (MKD) | Norway | 0–3 | Loss |
| 2011 | Europe Zone Group III, Play-offs | 14 May | Clay | Tennis Club Jug-Skopje, Skopje (MKD) | San Marino | 1–2 | Loss |
| 2012 | Europe Zone Group III, Group B | 2 May | Clay | Bulgarian National Tennis Centre, Sofia (BUL) | Bulgaria | 0–3 | Loss |
| 2012 | Europe Zone Group III, Group B | 3 May | Clay | Bulgarian National Tennis Centre, Sofia (BUL) | Georgia | 0–3 | Loss |
| 2012 | Europe Zone Group III, Play-offs | 5 May | Clay | Bulgarian National Tennis Centre, Sofia (BUL) | Montenegro | 0–3 | Loss |
| 2013 | Europe Zone Group III, Group D | 22 May | Clay | Centro Tennis Cassa di Risparmio, San Marino (SMR) | Azerbaijan | 3–0 | Win |
| 2013 | Europe Zone Group III, Group D | 23 May | Clay | Centro Tennis Cassa di Risparmio, San Marino (SMR) | Macedonia | 0–3 | Loss |
| 2013 | Europe Zone Group III, Group D | 24 May | Clay | Centro Tennis Cassa di Risparmio, San Marino (SMR) | Turkey | 0–3 | Loss |
| 2013 | Europe Zone Group III, Play-offs | 25 May | Clay | Centro Tennis Cassa di Risparmio, San Marino (SMR) | Liechtenstein | 0–2 | Loss |
| 2014 | Europe Zone Group III, Group B | 8 May | Clay | Gellért Szabadidőközpont, Szeged (HUN) | Macedonia | 0–3 | Loss |
| 2014 | Europe Zone Group III, Group B | 9 May | Clay | Gellért Szabadidőközpont, Szeged (HUN) | Malta | 0–3 | Loss |
| 2014 | Europe Zone Group III, Play-offs | 10 May | Clay | Gellért Szabadidőközpont, Szeged (HUN) | San Marino | 0–3 | Loss |
| 2015 | Europe Zone Group III, Group D | 15 July | Clay | San Marino (SMR) | Georgia | 0–3 | Loss |
| 2015 | Europe Zone Group III, Group D | 16 July | Clay | San Marino (SMR) | Malta | 0–3 | Loss |
| 2015 | Europe Zone Group III, Group D | 17 July | Clay | San Marino (SMR) | Iceland | 0–3 | Loss |
| 2016 | Europe Zone Group III, Group B | 2 March | Hard (i) | Tere Tennis Centre, Tallinn (EST) | Ireland | 0–3 | Loss |
| 2016 | Europe Zone Group III, Group B | 3 March | Hard (i) | Tere Tennis Centre, Tallinn (EST) | Macedonia | 0–3 | Loss |
| 2016 | Europe Zone Group III, Group B | 4 March | Hard (i) | Tere Tennis Centre, Tallinn (EST) | Armenia | 1–2 | Loss |
| 2016 | Europe Zone Group III, Play-offs | 5 March | Hard (i) | Tere Tennis Centre, Tallinn (EST) | Iceland | 0–3 | Loss |
| 2017 | Europe Zone Group III, Group C | 6 April | Hard | Holiday Village Santa Marina, Sozopol (BUL) | Liechtenstein | 0–3 | Loss |
| 2017 | Europe Zone Group III, Group C | 7 April | Hard | Holiday Village Santa Marina, Sozopol (BUL) | Luxembourg | 0–3 | Loss |
| 2017 | Europe Zone Group III, Group C | 7–8 April | Hard | Holiday Village Santa Marina, Sozopol (BUL) | San Marino | 2–1 | Win |
| 2017 | Europe Zone Group III, Play-offs | 8 April | Hard | Holiday Village Santa Marina, Sozopol (BUL) | Malta | 1–2 | Loss |
| 2018 | Europe Zone Group III, Group A | 4 April | Clay | Tennis Club Lokomotiv, Plovdiv (BUL) | Bulgaria | 0–3 | Loss |
| 2018 | Europe Zone Group III, Group A | 5 April | Clay | Tennis Club Lokomotiv, Plovdiv (BUL) | Macedonia | 0–3 | Loss |
| 2018 | Europe Zone Group III, Group A | 6 April | Clay | Tennis Club Lokomotiv, Plovdiv (BUL) | Iceland | 1–2 | Loss |
| 2018 | Europe Zone Group III, Play-offs | 7 April | Clay | Tennis Club Lokomotiv, Plovdiv (BUL) | San Marino | 0–2 | Loss |
| 2019 | Europe Zone Group IV, Group A | 16 July | Clay | Centro Tennis Cassa di Rispamio, San Marino (SMR) | Liechtenstein | 0–3 | Loss |
| 2019 | Europe Zone Group IV, Group A | 17 July | Clay | Centro Tennis Cassa di Rispamio, San Marino (SMR) | Armenia | 0–3 | Loss |
| 2019 | Europe Zone Group IV, Group A | 18 July | Clay | Centro Tennis Cassa di Rispamio, San Marino (SMR) | Cyprus | 0–3 | Loss |
| 2019 | Europe Zone Group IV, Group A | 19 July | Clay | Centro Tennis Cassa di Rispamio, San Marino (SMR) | Iceland | 0–3 | Loss |
| 2019 | Europe Zone Group IV, Play-offs | 20 July | Clay | Centro Tennis Cassa di Rispamio, San Marino (SMR) | Andorra | 2–1 | Win |

=== 2020s ===
| Year | Competition | Date | Surface | Venue | Opponent | Score | Result |
|---|---|---|---|---|---|---|---|
| 2021 | Europe Zone Group IV, Group A | 22 June | Clay | Tennis Club Jug, Skopje (MKD) | Montenegro | 0–3 | Loss |
| 2021 | Europe Zone Group IV, Group A | 23 June | Clay | Tennis Club Jug, Skopje (MKD) | Armenia | 1–2 | Loss |
| 2021 | Europe Zone Group IV, Group A | 26 June | Clay | Tennis Club Jug, Skopje (MKD) | Azerbaijan | 1–2 | Loss |
| 2022 | Europe Zone Group IV, Group A | 27 July | Hard | Baku Tennis Academy, Baku (AZE) | San Marino | 0–3 | Loss |
| 2022 | Europe Zone Group IV, Group A | 28 July | Hard | Baku Tennis Academy, Baku (AZE) | Iceland | 0–3 | Loss |
| 2022 | Europe Zone Group IV, 5th place play-off | 30 July | Hard | Baku Tennis Academy, Baku (AZE) | Andorra | 2–1 | Win |

== See also ==
- Davis Cup
- Albania Billie Jean King Cup team
