= 2019 Davis Cup Europe Zone Group III =

International tennis competition

The Europe Zone was the unique zone within Group 3 of the regional Davis Cup competition in 2019. The zone's competition was held in round robin format in Athens, Greece, from 11 to 14 September 2019.

== Participating nations ==
- Estonia
- Greece
- Latvia
- Luxembourg
- Monaco
- Montenegro
- North Macedonia
- Poland

== Draw ==
Date: 11–14 September

Location: Tatoi Club, Athens, Greece

Format: Round-robin basis.

=== Seeding ===
Pot	Nation	Rank^{1}	Seed
1	Luxembourg	65	1
1	Estonia	67	2
2	Poland	69	3
2	Latvia	71	4
3	Monaco	74	5
3	Montenegro	78	6
4	North Macedonia	79	7
4	Greece	85	8

- ^{1}Davis Cup Rankings as of 4 February 2019

=== Round Robin ===
==== Pool A ====
		POL	GRE	MON	LUX	RR; W–L	Set; W–L	Game; W–L	Standings
3	Poland		2–1	3–0	3–0	3–0	16–4 (80%)	105–69 (60%)	1
8	Greece	1–2		2–1	3–0	2–1	14–8 (64%)	115–82 (58%)	2
5	Monaco	0–3	1–2		3–0	1–2	10–12 (45%)	92–103 (47%)	3
1	Luxembourg	0–3	0–3	0–3		0–3	2–18 (10%)	60–118 (34%)	4

==== Pool B ====
		EST	LAT	MNE	MKD	RR; W–L	Set; W–L	Game; W–L	Standings
2	Estonia		2–1	3–0	3–0	3–0	16–5 (76%)	120–81 (60%)	1
4	Latvia	1–2		3–0	3–0	2–1	15–4 (79%)	112–76 (60%)	2
6	Montenegro	0–3	0–3		3–0	1–2	8–13 (38%)	89–105 (46%)	3
7	North Macedonia	0–3	0–3	0–3		0–3	1–18 (5%)	56–115 (33%)	4

Standings are determined by: 1. number of wins; 2. number of matches; 3. in two-team ties, head-to-head records; 4. in three-team ties, (a) percentage of sets won (head-to-head records if two teams remain tied), then (b) percentage of games won (head-to-head records if two teams remain tied), then (c) Davis Cup rankings.

=== Playoffs ===
Placing	A Team	Score	B Team
1st–2nd	Poland	2–0	Estonia
3rd–4th	Greece	2–1	Latvia
5th–8th	Monaco	2–1	North Macedonia
5th–8th	Luxembourg	2–1	Montenegro

== Round Robin ==
=== Pool A ===
==== Luxembourg vs. Greece ====
Luxembourg
0
Tatoi Club, Athens, Greece
11 September
Clay

Greece
3

			1	2	3
1	(Luxembourg) (Greece)	Ugo Nastasi; Michail Pervolarakis	7^{7} 6^{5}	3; 6	1; 6
2	(Luxembourg) (Greece)	Tom Diederich; Stefanos Tsitsipas	1; 6	0; 6
3	(Luxembourg) (Greece)	Chris Rodesch / Christophe Tholl; Markos Kalovelonis / Petros Tsitsipas	4; 6	5; 7

==== Poland vs. Monaco ====
Poland
3
Tatoi Club, Athens, Greece
11 September
Clay

Monaco
0

			1	2	3
1	(Poland) (Monaco)	Kamil Majchrzak; Romain Arneodo	6; 2	6; 2
2	(Poland) (Monaco)	Hubert Hurkacz; Lucas Catarina	6; 4	6; 2
3	(Poland) (Monaco)	Łukasz Kubot / Marcin Matkowski; Romain Arneodo / Benjamin Balleret	2; 6	6; 3	6; 4

==== Luxembourg vs. Monaco ====
Luxembourg
0
Tatoi Club, Athens, Greece
12 September
Clay

Monaco
3

			1	2	3
1	(Luxembourg) (Monaco)	Chris Rodesch; Romain Arneodo	1; 6	4; 6
2	(Luxembourg) (Monaco)	Ugo Nastasi; Lucas Catarina	4; 6	4; 6
3	(Luxembourg) (Monaco)	Tom Diederich / Christophe Tholl; Benjamin Balleret / Hugo Nys	1; 6	6; 3	3; 6

==== Poland vs. Greece ====
Poland
2
Tatoi Club, Athens, Greece
12 September
Clay

Greece
1

			1	2	3
1	(Poland) (Greece)	Kamil Majchrzak; Michail Pervolarakis	6; 4	6; 3
2	(Poland) (Greece)	Hubert Hurkacz; Stefanos Tsitsipas	3; 6	1; 6
3	(Poland) (Greece)	Łukasz Kubot / Marcin Matkowski; Michail Pervolarakis / Stefanos Tsitsipas	3; 6	6; 4	6; 1

==== Luxembourg vs. Poland ====
Luxembourg
0
Tatoi Club, Athens, Greece
13 September
Clay

Poland
3

			1	2	3
1	(Luxembourg) (Poland)	Chris Rodesch; Kamil Majchrzak	2; 6	3; 6
2	(Luxembourg) (Poland)	Christophe Tholl; Hubert Hurkacz	3; 6	3; 6
3	(Luxembourg) (Poland)	Tom Diederich / Chris Rodesch; Hubert Hurkacz / Łukasz Kubot	1; 6	4; 6

==== Monaco vs. Greece ====
Monaco
1
Tatoi Club, Athens, Greece
13 September
Clay

Greece
2

			1	2	3
1	(Monaco) (Greece)	Romain Arneodo; Michail Pervolarakis	1; 6	7^{10} 6^{8}	4; 6
2	(Monaco) (Greece)	Lucas Catarina; Stefanos Tsitsipas	2; 6	1; 6
3	(Monaco) (Greece)	Benjamin Balleret / Hugo Nys; Markos Kalovelonis / Petros Tsitsipas	3; 6	6; 3	6; 3

=== Pool B ===
==== Estonia vs. North Macedonia ====
Estonia
3
Tatoi Club, Athens, Greece
11 September
Clay

North Macedonia
0

			1	2	3
1	(Estonia) (North Macedonia)	Kenneth Raisma; Dimitar Grabul	6; 2	6; 4
2	(Estonia) (North Macedonia)	Jürgen Zopp; Gorazd Srbljak	7; 5	6; 1
3	(Estonia) (North Macedonia)	Kenneth Raisma / Jürgen Zopp; Luka Ljuben Andonov / Berk Bugarikj	6; 0	6; 2

==== Latvia vs. Montenegro ====
Latvia
3
Tatoi Club, Athens, Greece
11 September
Clay

Montenegro
0

			1	2	3
1	(Latvia) (Montenegro)	Robert Strombachs; Rrezart Cungu	6; 2	6; 4
2	(Latvia) (Montenegro)	Mārtiņš Podžus; Ljubomir Čelebić	6; 4	6; 3
3	(Latvia) (Montenegro)	Arturs Lazdins / Jānis Podžus; Rrezart Cungu / Igor Saveljić	6; 3	6; 4

==== Estonia vs. Montenegro ====
Estonia
3
Tatoi Club, Athens, Greece
12 September
Clay

Montenegro
0

			1	2	3
1	(Estonia) (Montenegro)	Vladimir Ivanov; Rrezart Cungu	6; 1	6; 3
2	(Estonia) (Montenegro)	Jürgen Zopp; Ljubomir Čelebić	6; 2	4; 6	6; 4
3	(Estonia) (Montenegro)	Vladimir Ivanov / Kenneth Raisma; Mario Aleksić / Igor Saveljić	6^{5} 7^{7}	6; 2	6; 4

==== Latvia vs. North Macedonia ====
Latvia
3
Tatoi Club, Athens, Greece
12 September
Clay

North Macedonia
0

			1	2	3
1	(Latvia) (North Macedonia)	Robert Strombachs; Dimitar Grabul	7^{9} 6^{7}	7^{7} 6^{2}
2	(Latvia) (North Macedonia)	Mārtiņš Podžus; Gorazd Srbljak	6; 1	6; 2
3	(Latvia) (North Macedonia)	Arturs Lazdins / Jānis Podžus; Dimitar Grabul / Gorazd Srbljak	6; 1	6; 3

==== Estonia vs. Latvia ====
Estonia
2
Tatoi Club, Athens, Greece
13 September
Clay

Latvia
1

			1	2	3
1	(Estonia) (Latvia)	Vladimir Ivanov; Robert Strombachs	7^{10} 6^{8}	4; 6	6; 3
2	(Estonia) (Latvia)	Jürgen Zopp; Mārtiņš Podžus	1; 6	6^{5} 7^{7}
3	(Estonia) (Latvia)	Kenneth Raisma / Jürgen Zopp; Jānis Podžus / Mārtiņš Podžus	7^{10} 6^{8}	6; 4

==== Montenegro vs. North Macedonia ====
Montenegro
3
Tatoi Club, Athens, Greece
13 September
Clay

North Macedonia
0

			1	2	3
1	(Montenegro) (North Macedonia)	Rrezart Cungu; Dimitar Grabul	6; 3	6; 2
2	(Montenegro) (North Macedonia)	Ljubomir Čelebić; Gorazd Srbljak	6; 3	3; 6	6; 3
3	(Montenegro) (North Macedonia)	Mario Aleksić / Igor Saveljić; Luka Ljuben Andonov / Berk Bugarikj	7^{7} 6^{3}	6; 0

== Playoffs ==
=== 1st to 2nd playoff ===
==== Poland vs. Estonia ====
Poland
2
Tatoi Club, Athens, Greece
14 September
Clay

Estonia
0

			1	2	3
1	(Poland) (Estonia)	Kamil Majchrzak; Kenneth Raisma	6; 0	6; 2
2	(Poland) (Estonia)	Hubert Hurkacz; Kristjan Tamm	6; 1	7; 5
3	(Poland) (Estonia)	Łukasz Kubot / Marcin Matkowski; Vladimir Ivanov / Kenneth Raisma				not played

=== 3rd to 4th playoff ===
==== Greece vs. Latvia ====
Greece
2
Tatoi Club, Athens, Greece
14 September
Clay

Latvia
1

			1	2	3
1	(Greece) (Latvia)	Michail Pervolarakis; Robert Strombachs	6; 4	6; 4
2	(Greece) (Latvia)	Stefanos Tsitsipas; Mārtiņš Podžus	6; 4	6; 4
3	(Greece) (Latvia)	Markos Kalovelonis / Petros Tsitsipas; Mārtiņš Podžus / Robert Strombachs	4; 6	0; 6

=== 5th to 8th playoff ===
==== Monaco vs. North Macedonia ====
Monaco
2
Tatoi Club, Athens, Greece
14 September
Clay

North Macedonia
1

			1	2	3
1	(Monaco) (North Macedonia)	Lucas Catarina; Dimitar Grabul	7^{13} 6^{11}	6; 2
2	(Monaco) (North Macedonia)	Hugo Nys; Gorazd Srbljak	6; 4	4; 6	4; 6
3	(Monaco) (North Macedonia)	Romain Arneodo / Benjamin Balleret; Dimitar Grabul / Gorazd Srbljak	6; 1	6; 2

=== 5th to 8th playoff ===
==== Luxembourg vs. Montenegro ====
Luxembourg
2
Tatoi Club, Athens, Greece
14 September
Clay

Montenegro
1

			1	2	3
1	(Luxembourg) (Montenegro)	Chris Rodesch; Rrezart Cungu	6; 4	5; 7	6; 1
2	(Luxembourg) (Montenegro)	Ugo Nastasi; Ljubomir Čelebić	3; 6	1; 6
3	(Luxembourg) (Montenegro)	Ugo Nastasi / Chris Rodesch; Ljubomir Čelebić / Igor Saveljić	6; 3	2; 6	6; 4
