= Kenneth Raisma =

Estonian tennis player

- Country (sports): Estonia
- Residence: Tallinn, Estonia
- Born: 3 April 1998 (age 28) Tartu, Estonia
- Plays: Left-handed (two handed-backhand)
- Prize money: $29,148

Singles
- Career record: 1–2 (at ATP Tour level and Grand Slam level)
- Career titles: 0
- Highest ranking: No. 676 (8 May 2017)

Grand Slam singles results
- Australian Open Junior: QF (2016)
- French Open Junior: 1R (2015)
- Wimbledon Junior: 1R (2015, 2016)
- US Open Junior: QF (2016)

Doubles
- Career record: 3–2 (at ATP Tour level and Grand Slam level)
- Career titles: 0
- Highest ranking: No. 720 (28 January 2019)

Grand Slam doubles results
- Australian Open Junior: QF (2016)
- French Open Junior: 1R (2015)
- Wimbledon Junior: W (2016)
- US Open Junior: 2R (2016)

Team competitions
- Davis Cup: 14–5
- Last updated on: 11 July 2022.

Kenneth Raisma (born 3 April 1998) is an Estonian tennis player. Raisma has a career high ATP singles ranking of 676, achieved on 8 May 2017. He also has a career high ATP doubles ranking of 720, achieved on 28 January 2019. Raisma has won 1 ITF singles and 5 doubles titles. Playing for Estonia in Davis Cup, Raisma has a win–loss record of 14–5.

== Playing career ==
He made his Davis Cup debut for Estonia in 2014, winning the only rubber he played that year. In 2015, Raisma again played the one rubber, this time in doubles, but again he was victorious. He gained his first ATP Point in 2015 at the Estonian Open, where Raisma defeated Italian Giorgio Ricca 6–3, 7–5.

By 2016, he was established as Estonia's No. 2 player behind Jurgen Zopp and played in three of Estonia's four ties in Europe Zone Group III of the Davis Cup. He won all three singles rubbers he played, without dropping a set as Estonia sealed promotion into Europe/Africa Zone Group II for 2017.

Raisma won the 2016 Wimbledon Championships – Boys' doubles title alongside Greek player Stefanos Tsitsipas. In doing so, he became the third Estonian to triumph in a grand slam tournament after Toomas Leius at the 1959 Wimbledon junior tournament, Kaia Kanepi at the 2001 French Open.

In 2017, his coaching staff was joined by the Italian head coach of the Jarkko Nieminen Academy, Frederico Ricci.

== Coaching career ==
In 2023, he coached Oliver Ojakäär as he made his junior grand slam debut at the 2023 Australian Open, and later that year when he won the boys' doubles at the 2023 US Open alongside Max Dahlin of Sweden, at Flushing Mesdow, New York.

== Junior Grand Slam finals ==
=== Boys' doubles ===
Result	Year	Tournament	Surface	Partner	Opponents	Score
Win	2016	Wimbledon Championships	Grass	(Greece) Stefanos Tsitsipas	(Canada) Félix Auger-Aliassime (Canada) Denis Shapovalov	4–6, 6–4, 6–2

== Future and Challenger finals ==
=== Singles: 3 (1–2) ===
Legend (singles) ATP Challenger Tour (0–0) ITF Futures Tour (1–1)	Titles by surface Hard (0–1) Clay (0–1) Grass (0–0) Carpet (1–0)

Result	W–L	Date	Tournament	Tier	Surface	Opponent	Score
Win	1–0	Oct 2016	Estonia F2, Tartu	Futures	Carpet (i)	(Estonia) Vladimir Ivanov	6–4, 6–3
Loss	1–1	May 2018	Hungary F2, Zalaegerszeg	Futures	Clay	(Hungary) Máté Valkusz	2–6, 1–6
Loss	1–2	Nov 2020	M15 Tunisia, Monastir	World Tennis Tour	Hard	(Turkey) Ergi Kırkın	6–1, 4–6, 1–6

=== Doubles 11 (5–6) ===
Legend (doubles) ATP Challenger Tour (0–0) ITF Futures Tour (5–6)	Titles by surface Hard (3–4) Clay (2–1) Grass (0–0) Carpet (0–1)

Result	W–L	Date	Tournament	Tier	Surface	Partner	Opponents	Score
Win	1–0	Nov 2015	Estonia F3, Tallinn	Futures	Hard (i)	(Netherlands) Niels Lootsma	(Russia) Alexander Vasilenko (Russia) Anton Zaitcev	4–6, 6–4, [10–8]
Win	2–0	Nov 2015	Estonia F4, Pärnu	Futures	Hard (i)	(Netherlands) Niels Lootsma	(Estonia) Anton Pavlov (Estonia) Martin Valdo Randpere	6–4, 6–3
Loss	2–1	Oct 2016	Estonia F2, Tartu	Futures	Carpet (i)	(Estonia) Vladimir Ivanov	(Russia) Alexander Vasilenko (Belarus) Dzmitry Zhyrmont	5–7, 2–6
Loss	2–2	Nov 2016	Estonia F4, Pärnu	Futures	Hard (i)	(Estonia) Vladimir Ivanov	(Ukraine) Marat Deviatiarov (Russia) Alexander Vasilenko	WO
Loss	2–3	Mar 2017	France F6, Poitiers	Futures	Hard (i)	(Estonia) Vladimir Ivanov	(France) Antoine Hoang (France) Grégoire Jacq	4–6, 4–6
Win	3–3	Mar 2018	Portugal F6, Lisbon	Futures	Hard	(Finland) Emil Ruusuvuori	(Canada) Steven Diez (Spain) Bruno Mardones	7–6^{(7–2)}, 6–2
Win	4–3	May 2018	Hungary F1, Zalaegerszeg	Futures	Clay	(Finland) Emil Ruusuvuori	(Australia) Adam Taylor (Australia) Jason Taylor	6–4, 6–4
Win	5–3	May 2019	M15 Bosnia and Herzegovina, Brčko	World Tennis Tour	Clay	(Estonia) Daniil Glinka	(France) Pierre Faivre (France) Maxime Tchoutakian	6–4, 5–7, [10–3]
Loss	5–4	Jul 2019	M15 Estonia, Pärnu	World Tennis Tour	Clay	(Estonia) Jürgen Zopp	(Estonia) Vladimir Ivanov (Russia) Maxim Ratniuk	6–3, 4–6, [5–10]
Loss	5–5	Nov 2020	M15 Tunisia, Monastir	World Tennis Tour	Hard	(Estonia) Kristjan Tamm	(Tunisia) Anis Ghorbel (Tunisia) Aziz Ouakaa	w/o
Loss	5–6	Oct 2021	M15 Estonia, Pärnu	World Tennis Tour	Hard (i)	(Estonia) Vladimir Ivanov	(Sweden) Filip Bergevi (Finland) Patrik Niklas-Salminen	6–4, 6–7^{(4–7)}, [8–10]

== Davis Cup ==
=== Participations: (14–5) ===
Group membership World Group (0–0) WG play-off (0–0) Group I (0–0) Group II (4–4) Group III (10–1) Group IV (0–0)	Matches by surface Hard (8–4) Clay (6–1) Grass (0–0) Carpet (0–0)	Matches by type Singles (6–3) Doubles (8–2)

- ▲ ▼ indicates the outcome of the Davis Cup match followed by the score, date, place of event, the zonal classification and its phase, and the court surface.

Rubber outcome	No.	Rubber	Match type (partner if any)	Opponent nation	Opponent player(s)	Score
▲3–0; 9 May 2014; Gellért Szabadidőközpont Szeged, Hungary; Europe Zone Group III round robin; clay surface
Victory	1	I	Singles	San Marino	Diego Zonzini	6–3, 6–2
▲3–0; 17 July 2015; City of San Marino, San Marino; Europe Zone Group III round robin; clay surface
Victory	2	III	Doubles (with Mattias Siimar) (dead rubber)	Montenegro	Rrezart Cungu / Ivan Saveljić	6–1, 6–2
▲3–0; 2 March 2016; Tere Tennis Centre, Tallinn, Europe Zone Group III round robin; hard (indoor) surface
Victory	3	I	Singles	Liechtenstein	Gian-Carlo Besimo	6–1, 6–3
Victory	4	III	Doubles (with Jürgen Zopp) (dead rubber)	Liechtenstein	Robin Forster / Timo Kranz	6–0, 7–6^{(7–2)}
▲3–0; 4 March 2016; Tere Tennis Centre, Tallinn, Estonia; Europe Zone Group III round robin; hard (indoor) surface
Victory	5	I	Singles	Greece	Christos Antonopoulos	6–1, 6–0
▲2–0; 5 March 2016; Tere Tennis Centre, Tallinn, Estonia; Europe Zone Group III Promotional play off; hard (indoor) surface
Victory	6	I	Singles	Moldova	Alexander Cozbinov	6–2, 6–4
▼1–4; 3-5 February 2017; Irene Country Club, Centurion, South Africa; Europe/Africa Zone Group II first round; hard surface
Defeat	7	III	Doubles (with Mattias Siimar)	South Africa	Raven Klaasen / Ruan Roelofse	7–6^{(7–4)}, 3–6, 4–6, 5–7
▲3–2; 7-9 April 2017; Tere Tennis Centre, Tallinn, Estonia; Europe/Africa Zone Group II relegation play-off; hard (indoor) surface
Victory	8	II	Singles	Monaco	Lucas Catarina	6–3, 6–0, 6–4
Victory	9	III	Doubles (with Mattias Siimar)	Monaco	Romain Arneodo / Benjamin Balleret	4–6, 6–1, 6–2, 7–6^{(9–7)}
▼1–3; 3-4 February 2018; Šiauliai Tennis School, Šiauliai, Lithuania; Europe/Africa Zone Group II first round; hard (indoor) surface
Defeat	10	II	Singles	Lithuania	Ričardas Berankis	5–7, 6–7^{(3–7)}
Defeat	11	III	Doubles (with Mattias Siimar)	Lithuania	Ričardas Berankis / Laurynas Grigelis	6–2, 4–6, 6–7^{(4–7)}
▲3–2; 7-8 April 2018; Tere Tennis Centre, Tallinn, Estonia; Europe/Africa Zone Group II relegation play-off; hard (indoor) surface
Defeat	12	II	Singles	Tunisia	Malek Jaziri	4–6, 6–7^{(9–11)}
Victory	13	III	Doubles (with Jürgen Zopp)	Tunisia	Moez Echargui / Malek Jaziri	6–3, 6–4
▲3–0; 11 September 2019; Tatoi Club, Athens, Greece; Europe Zone Group III Pool B round robin; clay surface
Victory	14	I	Singles	North Macedonia	Dimitar Grabul	6–2, 6–4
Victory	15	III	Doubles (with Jürgen Zopp) (dead rubber)	North Macedonia	Luka Ljuben Andonov / Berk Bugarikj	6–0, 6–2
▲3–0; 12 September 2019; Tatoi Club, Athens, Greece; Europe Zone Group III Pool B round robin; clay surface
Victory	16	III	Doubles (with Vladimir Ivanov) (dead rubber)	Montenegro	Mario Aleksić / Igor Saveljić	6–7^{(5–7)}, 6–2, 6–4
▲2–1; 13 September 2019; Tatoi Club, Athens, Greece; Europe Zone Group III Pool B round robin; clay surface
Victory	17	III	Doubles (with Jürgen Zopp)	Latvia	Jānis Podžus / Mārtiņš Podžus	7–6^{(10–8)}, 6–4
▼0–2; 14 September 2019; Tatoi Club, Athens, Greece; Europe Zone Group III promotional playoff; clay surface
Defeat	18	I	Singles	Poland	Kamil Majchrzak	0–6, 2–6
▲4–0; 4-5 March 2022; Forus Tenniscenter, Tallinn, Estonia; Europe Zone Group III Pool B round robin; clay surface
Victory	19	III	Doubles (with Jürgen Zopp)	Pacific Oceania	Brett Baudinet / Colin Sinclair	6–4, 6–2
