= 1995 Davis Cup =

1995 edition of the Davis Cup

Details
- Duration: 3 February – 3 December 1995
- Edition: 84th
- Teams: 115

Champion
- Winning nation: United States

The 1995 Davis Cup (also known as the 1995 Davis Cup by NEC for sponsorship purposes) was the 84th edition of the Davis Cup, the most important tournament between national teams in men's tennis. 115 teams entered the competition, 16 in the World Group, 25 in the Americas Zone, 29 in the Asia/Oceania Zone, and 45 in the Europe/Africa Zone. Bermuda, Ethiopia, Kazakhstan, Macedonia, Moldova and Pacific Oceania made their first appearances in the tournament.

The United States defeated Russia in the final, held at the Olympic Stadium in Moscow, Russia, on 1–3 December, to win their 31st title overall.

== World Group ==
Participating teams
Australia	Austria	Belgium	Croatia
Czech Republic	Denmark	France	Germany
Italy	Netherlands	Russia	South Africa
Spain	Sweden	Switzerland	United States

=== Draw ===
First round 3–6 February
St. Petersburg, United States (indoor carpet)
United States	4
France	1
Naples, Italy (clay)
Czech Republic	1
Italy	4
Copenhagen, Denmark (indoor carpet)
Sweden	3
Denmark	2
Vienna, Austria (indoor hard)
Spain	1
Austria	4
Durban, South Africa (hard)
South Africa	3
Australia	2
Antwerp, Belgium (indoor clay)
Belgium	1
Russia	4
Geneva, Switzerland (indoor clay)
Switzerland	1
Netherlands	4
Karlsruhe, Germany (indoor hard)
Croatia	1
Germany	4

Quarterfinals; 31 March–2 April
Palermo, Italy (clay)
United States	5
Italy	0
Växjö, Sweden (indoor carpet)
Sweden	5
Austria	0
Moscow, Russia (indoor carpet)
South Africa	1
Russia	4
Utrecht, Netherlands (indoor hard)
Netherlands	1
Germany	4

Semifinals; 22–24 September
Las Vegas, United States (hard)
United States	4
Sweden	1
Moscow, Russia (indoor clay)
Russia	3
Germany	2

Final; 1–3 December
Moscow, Russia (indoor clay)
United States	3
Russia	2

=== Final ===
Russia vs. United States

Russia
2
Olympic Stadium, Moscow, Russia
1–3 December 1995
Clay (indoors)

United States
3

			1	2	3	4	5
1	(Russia) (United States)	Andrei Chesnokov; Pete Sampras	6; 3	4; 6	3; 6	7^{7} 6^{5}	4; 6
2	(Russia) (United States)	Yevgeny Kafelnikov; Jim Courier	7^{7} 6^{1}	7; 5	6; 3
3	(Russia) (United States)	Yevgeny Kafelnikov / Andrei Olhovskiy; Todd Martin / Pete Sampras	5; 7	4; 6	3; 6
4	(Russia) (United States)	Yevgeny Kafelnikov; Pete Sampras	2; 6	4; 6	6^{4} 7^{7}
5	(Russia) (United States)	Andrei Chesnokov; Jim Courier	6^{1} 7^{7}	7; 5	6; 0

== World Group qualifying round ==
Date: 22–24 September

The eight losing teams in the World Group first round ties and eight winners of the Zonal Group I final round ties competed in the World Group qualifying round for spots in the 1996 World Group.

Home team	Score	Visiting team	Location	Venue	Door	Surface
Hungary	3–2	Australia	Budapest	Kisstadion	Outdoor	Clay
Norway	0–5	Belgium	Oslo	Riksanlegget	Indoor	Hard
India	3–2	Croatia	New Delhi	National Sports Club	Outdoor	Grass
Czech Republic	4–1	Zimbabwe	Prague	National Centre	Outdoor	Clay
Venezuela	2–3	Denmark	Caracas	National Centre	Outdoor	Clay
Mexico	3–2	Spain	Mexico City	Club Alemán de México	Outdoor	Hard
Morocco	0–5	France	Casablanca	Complexe Al Amal	Outdoor	Clay
New Zealand	1–4	Switzerland	Hamilton	Mystery Creek Pavilion	Outdoor	Hard

- Belgium, Czech Republic, Denmark, France and Switzerland remain in the World Group in 1996.
- Hungary, India and Mexico are promoted to the World Group in 1996.
- Morocco, New Zealand, Norway, Venezuela and Zimbabwe remain in Zonal Group I in 1996.
- Australia, Croatia and Spain are relegated to Zonal Group I in 1996.

== Americas Zone ==
=== Group I ===
Second Round Play-offs
Lima, Peru (hard)
Uruguay	1
Peru	4

First Round Play-offs
Santiago, Chile (clay)
Uruguay	0
Chile	5
Lima, Peru (clay)
Bahamas	3
Peru	2

First Round
Caracas, Venezuela (hard)
Uruguay	0
Venezuela	5
Buenos Aires, Argentina (clay)
Argentina	3
Chile	2
Rio de Janeiro, Brazil (clay)
Bahamas	0
Brazil	5
Mexico City, Mexico (hard)
Mexico	3
Peru	1

Second Round
Caracas, Venezuela (hard)
Venezuela	3
Argentina	2
Mexico City, Mexico (hard)
Brazil	1
Mexico	4

- Uruguay relegated to Group II in 1996.
- Venezuela and Mexico advance to World Group qualifying round.

=== Group II ===
Relegation Play-offs
Cochabamba, Bolivia (clay)
Cuba	5
Bolivia	0
Port-au-Prince, Haiti (clay)
Paraguay	3
Haiti	2

First Round
Guayaquil, Ecuador (clay)
Cuba	2
Ecuador	3
Guatemala City, Guatemala (hard)
Guatemala	4
Bolivia	1
Asunción, Paraguay (clay)
Paraguay	2
Colombia	3
Port-au-Prince, Haiti (clay)
Haiti	2
Canada	3

Second Round
Guayaquil, Ecuador (clay)
Ecuador	5
Guatemala	0
Kelowna, Canada (indoor carpet)
Colombia	0
Canada	5

Third Round
Victoria, Canada (indoor carpet)
Ecuador	2
Canada	3

- Bolivia and Haiti relegated to Group III in 1996.
- Canada promoted to Group I in 1996.

=== Group III ===
- Venue: Santo Domingo Tennis Club, Santo Domingo, Dominican Republic
- Date: 1–5 March

Group A

	PUR	DOM	CRC	ECA	BER	RR; W–L	Match; W–L	Set; W–L	Standings
Puerto Rico		2–1	3–0	2–1	3–0	4–0	10–2 (83%)	21–8 (72%)	1
Dominican Republic	1–2		2–1	2–1	3–0	3–1	8–4 (67%)	18–9 (67%)	2
Costa Rica	0–3	1–2		2–1	3–0	2–2	6–6 (50%)	15–15 (50%)	3
Eastern Caribbean	1–2	1–2	1–2		3–0	1–3	6–6 (50%)	13–15 (46%)	4
Bermuda	0–3	0–3	0–3	0–3		0–4	0–12 (0%)	4–24 (14%)	5

Group B

	BAR	ESA	JAM	TRI	RR; W–L	Match; W–L	Set; W–L	Standings
Barbados		3–0	2–1	3–0	3–0	8–1 (89%)	17–3 (85%)	1
El Salvador	0–3		3–0	3–0	2–1	6–3 (67%)	12–6 (67%)	2
Jamaica	1–2	0–3		2–1	1–2	3–6 (33%)	7–13 (35%)	3
Trinidad and Tobago	0–3	0–3	1–2		0–3	1–8 (11%)	2–16 (11%)	4

- Puerto Rico and Barbados promoted to Group II in 1996.

== Asia/Oceania Zone ==
=== Group I ===
Second Round Play-offs
Causeway Bay, Hong Kong (hard)
Chinese Taipei	5
Hong Kong	0

First Round Play-offs
Jakarta, Indonesia (clay)
Chinese Taipei	1
Indonesia	4
Fujisawa, Japan (indoor hard)
Japan	5
Hong Kong	0

First Round
Wellington, New Zealand (hard)
New Zealand	5
Chinese Taipei	0
Seoul, South Korea (indoor carpet)
Indonesia	0
South Korea	5
Manila, Philippines (indoor clay)
Philippines	3
Japan	2
Calcutta, India (grass)
Hong Kong	1
India	4

Second Round
Christchurch, New Zealand (grass)
New Zealand	4
South Korea	1
New Delhi, India (grass)
Philippines	0
India	5

- Hong Kong relegated to Group II in 1996.
- New Zealand and India advance to World Group qualifying round.

=== Group II ===
Relegation Play-offs
Lahore, Pakistan (grass)
Pakistan	4
Malaysia	1
Doha, Qatar (hard)
Qatar	1
Iran	4

First Round
Lahore, Pakistan (grass)
China	3
Pakistan	2
Bangkok, Thailand (hard)
Malaysia	1
Thailand	4
Doha, Qatar (hard)
Uzbekistan	5
Qatar	0
Colombo, Sri Lanka (clay)
Sri Lanka	3
Iran	2

Second Round
Bangkok, Thailand (hard)
China	3
Thailand	2
Tashkent, Uzbekistan (clay)
Uzbekistan	5
Sri Lanka	0

Third Round
Tashkent, Uzbekistan (clay)
China	3
Uzbekistan	2

- Malaysia and Qatar relegated to Group III in 1996.
- China promoted to Group I in 1996.

=== Group III ===
- Venue: Dubai Creek Golf & Yacht Club, Dubai, United Arab Emirates
- Date: 10–16 April

Group A

	BHR	SIN	KUW	SYR	KAZ	OMA	BRU	RR; W–L	Match; W–L	Set; W–L	Standings
Bahrain		2–1	2–1	3–0	2–1	2–1	3–0	6–0	14–4 (78%)	30–11 (73%)	1
Singapore	1–2		3–0	3–0	3–0	3–0	3–0	5–1	16–2 (89%)	33–9 (79%)	2
Kuwait	1–2	0–3		3–0	3–0	3–0	3–0	4–2	13–5 (72%)	29–11 (73%)	3
Syria	0–3	0–3	0–3		3–0	2–1	3–0	3–3	8–10 (44%)	19–21 (48%)	4
Kazakhstan	1–2	0–3	0–3	0–3		1–2	2–1	1–5	4–14 (22%)	12–28 (30%)	5
Oman	1–2	0–3	0–3	1–2	2–1		1–2	1–5	5–13 (28%)	10–30 (25%)	6
Brunei	0–3	0–3	0–3	0–3	1–2	2–1		1–5	3–15 (17%)	7–30 (19%)	7

Group B

	KSA	BAN	POC	LIB	JOR	UAE	RR; W–L	Match; W–L	Set; W–L	Standings
Saudi Arabia		3–0	2–1	2–1	3–0	2–1	5–0	12–3 (80%)	25–9 (74%)	1
Bangladesh	0–3		2–1	2–1	3–0	3–0	4–1	10–5 (67%)	21–12 (64%)	2
Pacific Oceania	1–2	1–2		2–1	3–0	3–0	3–2	10–5 (67%)	22–16 (58%)	3
Lebanon	1–2	1–2	1–2		2–1	3–0	2–3	8–7 (53%)	19–15 (56%)	4
Jordan	0–3	0–3	0–3	1–2		2–1	1–4	3–12 (20%)	10–24 (29%)	5
United Arab Emirates	1–2	0–3	0–3	0–3	1–2		0–5	2–13 (13%)	5–26 (16%)	6

- Bahrain and Saudi Arabia promoted to Group II in 1996.

== Europe/Africa Zone ==
=== Group I ===
Relegation Play-offs
Estoril, Portugal (clay)
Romania	3
Portugal	2
Ramat HaSharon, Israel (hard)
Slovenia	0
Israel	5

First Round
Casablanca, Morocco (clay)
Morocco	4
Romania	1
Budapest, Hungary (indoor carpet)
Portugal	2
Hungary	3
Portorož, Slovenia (clay)
Slovenia	0
Zimbabwe	5
Oslo, Norway (indoor hard)
Norway	4
Israel	1

- Morocco, Hungary, Zimbabwe and Norway advance to World Group qualifying round.
- Portugal and Slovenia relegated to Group II in 1996.

=== Group II ===
Relegation Play-offs
Vilnius, Lithuania (clay)
Lithuania	1
Poland	4
Abidjan, Ivory Coast (hard)
Ireland	2
Ivory Coast	3
Minsk, Belarus (carpet)
Belarus	5
Estonia	0
Eastbourne, United Kingdom (grass)
Monaco	0
Great Britain	5

First Round
Šiauliai, Lithuania (indoor carpet)
Luxembourg	4
Lithuania	1
Lagos, Nigeria (hard)
Nigeria	3
Poland	2
Accra, Ghana (hard)
Ghana	3
Ireland	2
Abidjan, Ivory Coast (hard)
Ivory Coast	2
Finland	3
Minsk, Belarus (indoor carpet)
Ukraine	3
Belarus	2
Tallinn, Estonia (indoor carpet)
Estonia	2
Latvia	3
Cairo, Egypt (clay)
Egypt	4
Monaco	1
Bratislava, Slovakia (clay)
Slovakia	5
Great Britain	0

Second Round
Esch-sur-Alzette, Lux. (indoor carpet)
Luxembourg	4
Nigeria	1
Tampere, Finland (clay)
Ghana	0
Finland	5
Jūrmala, Latvia (clay)
Ukraine	3
Latvia	2
Cairo, Egypt (clay)
Egypt	3
Slovakia	2

Third Round
Helsinki, Finland (indoor carpet)
Luxembourg	1
Finland	4
Cairo, Egypt (clay)
Ukraine	4
Egypt	1

- Lithuania, Ireland, Estonia, and Monaco relegated to Group III in 1996.
- Finland and Ukraine promoted to Group I in 1996.

=== Group III – Zone A ===
- Venue: Centro Tennis Cassa di Risparmio, San Marino, San Marino
- Date: 10–14 May

Group A

	MKD	BUL	GEO	TUN	CMR	RR; W–L	Match; W–L	Set; W–L	Standings
Macedonia		2–1	2–1	3–0	3–0	4–0	10–2 (83%)	21–7 (75%)	1
Bulgaria	1–2		2–0	3–0	3–0	3–1	9–2 (82%)	18–7 (72%)	2
Georgia	1–2	0–2		3–0	3–0	2–2	7–4 (64%)	16–9 (64%)	3
Tunisia	0–3	0–3	0–3		2–0	1–3	2–9 (18%)	6–19 (24%)	4
Cameroon	0–3	0–3	0–3	0–2		0–4	0–11 (0%)	3–22 (12%)	5

Group B

	FRY	GRE	SMR	MDA	TOG	BEN	RR; W–L	Match; W–L	Set; W–L	Standings
Yugoslavia		2–1	3–0	3–0	3–0	3–0	5–0	14–1 (93%)	29–3 (91%)	1
Greece	1–2		2–1	3–0	3–0	3–0	4–1	12–3 (80%)	24–9 (73%)	2
San Marino	0–3	1–2		2–1	3–0	2–1	3–2	8–7 (53%)	17–15 (53%)	3
Moldova	0–3	0–3	1–2		3–0	2–1	2–3	6–9 (40%)	15–19 (44%)	4
Togo	0–3	0–3	0–3	0–3		3–0	1–4	3–12 (20%)	8–25 (24%)	5
Benin	0–3	0–3	1–2	1–2	0–3		0–5	2–13 (13%)	6–28 (18%)	6

- Macedonia and Yugoslavia promoted to Group II in 1996.

=== Group III – Zone B ===
- Venue: Tennis Club de Brazzaville, Brazzaville, Congo
- Date: 26–30 April

Group A

	MLT	CYP	KEN	CGO	ETH	RR; W–L	Match; W–L	Set; W–L	Standings
Malta		2–1	3–0	2–1	2–1	4–0	9–3 (75%)	19–9 (68%)	1
Cyprus	1–2		2–1	3–0	3–0	3–1	9–3 (75%)	19–7 (73%)	2
Kenya	0–3	1–2		2–1	3–0	2–2	6–6 (50%)	15–14 (52%)	3
Congo	1–2	0–3	1–2		2–1	1–3	4–8 (33%)	9–18 (33%)	4
Ethiopia	1–2	0–3	0–3	1–2		0–4	2–10 (17%)	7–21 (25%)	5

Group B

	ALG	TUR	ZAM	SEN	SUD	RR; W–L	Match; W–L	Set; W–L	Standings
Algeria		3–0	3–0	2–1	3–0	4–0	11–1 (92%)	22–3 (88%)	1
Turkey	0–3		2–1	2–1	3–0	3–1	7–5 (58%)	14–10 (58%)	2
Zambia	0–3	1–2		2–1	3–0	2–2	6–6 (50%)	12–13 (48%)	3
Senegal	1–2	1–2	1–2		3–0	1–3	6–6 (50%)	14–12 (54%)	4
Sudan	0–3	0–3	0–3	0–3		0–4	0–12 (0%)	0–24 (0%)	5

- Malta and Algeria promoted to Group II in 1996.
