= Liechtenstein Davis Cup team =

National tennis team

Liechtenstein
- Captain: Jozef Banzer
- Nations Ranking: 87 ▲14
- First year: 1996
- Years played: 11
- Ties played (W–L): 46 (17–29)
- Best finish: Europe Zone group III; 5th-8th Playoff (2017)
- Most total wins: Timo Kranz (13–9)
- Most singles wins: Stephan Ritter (11–6)
- Most doubles wins: Timo Kranz (7–1)
- Best doubles team: Timo Kranz & Vital Flurin Leuch (3–0)
- Most ties played: Stephan Ritter, Vital Flurin Leuch (19)
- Most years played: Vital Flurin Leuch (6)

The Liechtenstein Davis Cup team represents Liechtenstein in Davis Cup tennis competition and is governed by the Liechtensteiner Tennisverband. Liechtenstein currently compete in the Europe Zone Group IV. They did not compete in 1999, 2001 and between 2002-2013.

== History ==
Liechtenstein competed in its first Davis Cup in 1996. Kenny Banzer became the youngest ever Davis Cup player in 2000, playing for Liechtenstein five days after his 14th birthday. Their best result was seventh-eighth Group III in 2017.

== Current team (2022) ==
- Gian-Carlo Besimo
- Andrej Spasojevic (Junior player)
- Eric Peppard

== Statistics ==
Last updated: Liechtenstein - Latvia; 7 April 2018

Record

- Total: 17–29 (36.9%)

Head-to-head record (1996–)

DC team	Pld	W	L
Albania	2	2	0
Algeria	2	0	2
Andorra	1	0	1
Armenia	2	1	1
Azerbaijan	2	0	2
Benin	1	1	0
Bosnia and Herzegovina	1	0	1
Botswana	1	1	0
Estonia	2	0	2
Ethiopia	1	0	1
Georgia	2	0	2
Greece	2	0	2
Hungary	1	0	1
Iceland	2	1	1
Kosovo	2	2	0
Latvia	1	0	1
Luxembourg	1	0	1
Madagascar	1	0	1
Malta	1	1	0
Moldova	2	0	2
Montenegro	3	0	3
Nigeria	1	0	1
San Marino	3	2	1
Sudan	3	3	0
Togo	1	0	1
Tunisia	1	1	0
Turkey	1	0	1
Uganda	2	2	0
Zambia	1	0	1
Total (29)	46	17	29

Record against continents

Africa	Asia	Europe	North America	Oceania	South America
Algeria; Benin; Botswana; Ethiopia; Madagascar; Nigeria; Sudan; Togo; Tunisia; Uganda; Zambia		Albania; Andorra; Armenia; Azerbaijan; Bosnia and Herzegovina; Estonia; Georgia; Greece; Hungary; Iceland; Kosovo; Latvia; Luxembourg; Malta; Moldova; Montenegro; San Marino; Turkey			
Record: 8-7 (53.3%)	Record: 0-0	Record: 9-22 (29.0%)	Record: 0-0	Record: 0-0	Record: 0-0

Record by decade

- 1996–1999: 5–10 (33.3%)
- 2000–2009: 3–7 (30.0%)
- 2010–2019: 9–12 (42.9%)

== See also ==
- Davis Cup
- Liechtenstein Billie Jean King Cup team
