= Montenegro Tennis Association =

Logo

The Montenegro Tennis Association (MTA) (Montenegrin: Teniski savez Crne Gore, TSCG) is the governing body of tennis in Montenegro. It is based in Podgorica and its current president is Dimitrija Rašović. It has been a member of the International Tennis Federation (ITF) since 24 August 2006.

The association organizes Davis Cup team and the Billie Jean King Cup team matches.
