= Montenegro Davis Cup team =

National tennis team

Montenegro
- Captain: Rrezart Cungu
- Nations Ranking: 83 (21 September 2026)
- Colors: Red & Yellow
- First year: 2007
- Years played: 19
- Ties played (W–L): 71 (42–29)
- Best finish: Europe/Africa Zone group II first round (2009)
- Most total wins: Ljubomir Čelebić (33–12)
- Most singles wins: Ljubomir Čelebić (21–9)
- Most doubles wins: Ljubomir Čelebić (12–3)
- Most ties played: Ljubomir Čelebić (33)
- Most years played: Ljubomir Čelebić (10)

The Montenegro Davis Cup team represents Montenegro in Davis Cup tennis competition and is governed by the Tennis Federation of Montenegro.

== Current team ==
The following players represented the team in 2026 Davis Cup ties.

- Petar Jovanović (singles, doubles) [4–2, 3–1]
- Simon Knežević (singles, doubles) [1–3, 1–0]
- Aleksa Krivokapić (singles, doubles) [0–2, 2–1]

== List of matches ==
=== 2000s ===
| Year | Competition | Round | Date | Location | Opponent | Surface | Score | Result |
|---|---|---|---|---|---|---|---|---|
| 2007 | Europe/Africa Zone (Group IV) | Promotion playoffs | 8 Aug | Yerevan (ARM) | Botswana | Clay | 3–0 | Win |
| 2007 | Europe/Africa Zone (Group IV) | Promotion playoffs | 9 Aug | Yerevan (ARM) | Rwanda | Clay | 3–0 | Win |
| 2007 | Europe/Africa Zone (Group IV) | Promotion playoffs | 10 Aug | Yerevan (ARM) | Andorra | Clay | 3–0 | Win |
| 2007 | Europe/Africa Zone (Group IV) | Promotion playoffs | 12 Aug | Yerevan (ARM) | Armenia | Clay | 3–0 | Win |
| 2008 | Europe/Africa Zone (Group III - A) | Promotion playoffs | 8 Apr | Plovdiv (BUL) | Bulgaria | Clay | 0–3 | Loss |
| 2008 | Europe/Africa Zone (Group III - A) | Promotion playoffs | 9 Apr | Plovdiv (BUL) | Zimbabwe | Clay | 3–0 | Win |
| 2008 | Europe/Africa Zone (Group III - A) | Promotion playoffs | 10 Apr | Plovdiv (BUL) | Turkey | Clay | 2–1 | Win |
| 2008 | Europe/Africa Zone (Group III - A) | Promotion playoffs | 11 Apr | Plovdiv (BUL) | Ivory Coast | Clay | 3–0 | Win |
| 2008 | Europe/Africa Zone (Group III - A) | Promotion playoffs | 12 Apr | Plovdiv (BUL) | Madagascar | Clay | 2–1 | Win |
| 2009 | Europe/Africa Zone (Group II) | First round | 6–8 Mar | Monte Carlo (MON) | Monaco | Clay | 0–5 | Loss |
| 2009 | Europe/Africa Zone (Group II) | Relegation playoffs | 10–12 Jul | Lyngby (DEN) | Denmark | Clay | 2–3 | Loss |

=== 2010s ===
| Year | Competition | Round | Date | Location | Opponent | Surface | Score | Result |
|---|---|---|---|---|---|---|---|---|
| 2010 | Europe Zone (Group III - B) | Qualification group | 10 May | Marousi (GRE) | Armenia | Hard | 3–0 | Win |
| 2010 | Europe Zone (Group III - B) | Qualification group | 11 May | Marousi (GRE) | Greece | Hard | 1–2 | Loss |
| 2010 | Europe Zone (Group III - B) | Qualification group | 12 May | Marousi (GRE) | Albania | Hard | 3–0 | Win |
| 2010 | Europe Zone (Group III - B) | Qualification group | 13 May | Marousi (GRE) | San Marino | Hard | 3–0 | Win |
| 2010 | Europe Zone (Group III - B) | Qualification group | 14 May | Marousi (GRE) | Moldova | Hard | 1–2 | Loss |
| 2010 | Europe Zone (Group III) | 5th place playoffs | 15 May | Marousi (GRE) | Malta | Hard | 3–0 | Win |
| 2011 | Europe Zone (Group III - C) | Qualification group | 11 May | Skopje (MKD) | Georgia | Clay | 3–0 | Win |
| 2011 | Europe Zone (Group III - C) | Qualification group | 13 May | Skopje (MKD) | Armenia | Clay | 2–1 | Win |
| 2011 | Europe Zone (Group III) | Promotion playoffs | 14 May | Skopje (MKD) | Moldova | Clay | 1–2 | Loss |
| 2012 | Europe Zone (Group III - C) | Qualification group | 3 May | Sofia (BUL) | Armenia | Clay | 1–2 | Loss |
| 2012 | Europe Zone (Group III - C) | Qualification group | 4 May | Sofia (BUL) | Macedonia | Clay | 0–2 | Loss |
| 2012 | Europe Zone (Group III) | 9th-12th place playoffs | 5 May | Sofia (BUL) | Albania | Clay | 3–0 | Win |
| 2013 | Europe Zone (Group III - A) | Qualification group | 22 May | San Marino (SMR) | Greece | Clay | 0–3 | Loss |
| 2013 | Europe Zone (Group III - A) | Qualification group | 24 May | San Marino (SMR) | Liechtenstein | Clay | 2–1 | Win |
| 2013 | Europe Zone (Group III) | 5th-8th place playoffs | 25 May | San Marino (SMR) | San Marino | Clay | 1–1 | Abandoned |
| 2014 | Europe Zone (Group III - C) | Qualification group | 7 May | Szeged (HUN) | Georgia | Clay | 0–3 | Loss |
| 2014 | Europe Zone (Group III - C) | Qualification group | 9 May | Szeged (HUN) | Iceland | Clay | 3–0 | Win |
| 2014 | Europe Zone (Group III) | 5th-8th place playoffs | 10 May | Szeged (HUN) | Liechtenstein | Clay | 3–0 | Win |
| 2015 | Europe Zone (Group III - B) | Qualification group | 16 Jul | San Marino (SMR) | Liechtenstein | Clay | 3–0 | Win |
| 2015 | Europe Zone (Group III - B) | Qualification group | 17 Jul | San Marino (SMR) | Estonia | Clay | 0–3 | Loss |
| 2015 | Europe Zone (Group III) | 5th-8th place playoffs | 18 Jul | San Marino (SMR) | Malta | Clay | 2–1 | Win |
| 2016 | Europe Zone (Group III - C) | Qualification group | 2 Mar | Tallinn (EST) | Andorra | Hard (i) | 2–1 | Win |
| 2016 | Europe Zone (Group III - C) | Qualification group | 3 Mar | Tallinn (EST) | Iceland | Hard (i) | 2–1 | Win |
| 2016 | Europe Zone (Group III - C) | Qualification group | 4 Mar | Tallinn (EST) | Cyprus | Hard (i) | 0–3 | Loss |
| 2016 | Europe Zone (Group III) | 5th-8th place playoffs | 5 Mar | Tallinn (EST) | North Macedonia | Hard (i) | 0–2 | Loss |
| 2017 | Europe Zone (Group III - D) | Qualification group | 6 Apr | Sozopol (BUL) | Kosovo | Hard | 3–0 | Win |
| 2017 | Europe Zone (Group III - D) | Qualification group | 7 Apr | Sozopol (BUL) | Andorra | Hard | 2–1 | Win |
| 2017 | Europe Zone (Group III - D) | Qualification group | 7-8 Apr | Sozopol (BUL) | Ireland | Hard | 1–2 | Loss |
| 2017 | Europe Zone (Group III) | 5th-8th place playoffs | 8 Apr | Sozopol (BUL) | Greece | Hard | 2–1 | Win |
| 2018 | Europe Zone (Group III - C) | Qualification group | 4 Apr | Ulcinj (MNE) | Armenia | Clay | 3–0 | Win |
| 2018 | Europe Zone (Group III - C) | Qualification group | 5 Apr | Ulcinj (MNE) | Latvia | Clay | 2–1 | Win |
| 2018 | Europe Zone (Group III - C) | Qualification group | 6 Apr | Ulcinj (MNE) | Greece | Clay | 2–1 | Win |
| 2018 | Europe Zone (Group III) | Playoffs | 7 Apr | Ulcinj (MNE) | Malta | Clay | 3–0 | Win |
| 2019 | Europe Zone (Group III - B) | Qualification group | 11 Sep | Athens (GRE) | Latvia | Clay | 0–3 | Loss |
| 2019 | Europe Zone (Group III - B) | Qualification group | 12 Sep | Athens (GRE) | Estonia | Clay | 0–3 | Loss |
| 2019 | Europe Zone (Group III - B) | Qualification group | 13 Sep | Athens (GRE) | North Macedonia | Clay | 3–0 | Win |
| 2019 | Europe Zone (Group III) | 5th-8th place playoffs | 14 Sep | Athens (GRE) | Luxembourg | Clay | 1–2 | Loss |

=== 2020s ===
| Year | Competition | Round | Date | Location | Opponent | Surface | Score | Result |
|---|---|---|---|---|---|---|---|---|
| 2020–21 | Group IV (Europe Zone) | Pool A | 22 Jun 2021 | Skopje (MKD) | Albania | Clay | 3–0 | Win |
| 2020–21 | Group IV (Europe Zone) | Pool A | 24 Jun 2021 | Skopje (MKD) | Azerbaijan | Clay | 3–0 | Win |
| 2020–21 | Group IV (Europe Zone) | Pool A | 26 Jun 2021 | Skopje (MKD) | Armenia | Clay | 3–0 | Win |
| 2022 | Group III (Europe Zone) | Pool B | 22 Jun | Ulcinj (MNE) | Moldova | Clay | 1–2 | Loss |
| 2022 | Group III (Europe Zone) | Pool B | 23 Jun | Ulcinj (MNE) | North Macedonia | Clay | 1–2 | Loss |
| 2022 | Group III (Europe Zone) | Pool B | 24 Jun | Ulcinj (MNE) | Luxembourg | Clay | 1–2 | Loss |
| 2022 | Group III (Europe Zone) | Relegation playoffs | 25 Jun | Ulcinj (MNE) | Armenia | Clay | 3–0 | Win |
| 2023 | Group III (Europe Zone) | Pool A | 14 Jun | Larnaca (CYP) | Estonia | Hard | 1–2 | Loss |
| 2023 | Group III (Europe Zone) | Pool A | 15 Jun | Larnaca (CYP) | San Marino | Hard | 3–0 | Win |
| 2023 | Group III (Europe Zone) | Promotion final | 17 Jun | Larnaca (CYP) | Cyprus | Hard | 0–2 | Loss |
| 2024 | Group III (Europe Zone) | Pool A | 19 Jun | Ulcinj (MNE) | North Macedonia | Clay | 3–0 | Win |
| 2024 | Group III (Europe Zone) | Pool A | 21 Jun | Ulcinj (MNE) | Slovenia | Clay | 1–2 | Loss |
| 2024 | Group III (Europe Zone) | Playoffs | 22 Jun | Ulcinj (MNE) | Cyprus | Clay | 1–2 | Loss |
| 2025 | World Group II | Playoffs | 31 Jan–1 Feb | Beijing (CHN) | China | Hard (i) | 0–4 | Loss |
| 2025 | Group III (Europe Zone) | Promotion playoffs | 10 Jun | Skopje (MKD) | Latvia | Clay | 1–2 | Loss |
| 2025 | Group III (Europe Zone) | Promotion playoffs | 11 Jun | Skopje (MKD) | North Macedonia | Clay | 3–0 | Win |
| 2025 | Group III (Europe Zone) | Promotion playoffs | 12 Jun | Skopje (MKD) | Armenia | Clay | 3–0 | Win |
| 2025 | Group III (Europe Zone) | Promotion playoffs | 13 Jun | Skopje (MKD) | Malta | Clay | 3–0 | Win |
| 2025 | Group III (Europe Zone) | Promotion playoffs | 14 Jun | Skopje (MKD) | Moldova | Clay | 3–0 | Win |
| 2026 | World Group II | Playoffs | 7 Feb | Pretoria (RSA) | South Africa | Hard | 2–3 | Loss |
| 2026 | Group III (Europe Zone) | Pool A | 10 Jun | Chișinău (MLD) | Ireland | Clay | 2–1 | Win |
| 2026 | Group III (Europe Zone) | Pool A | 11 Jun | Chișinău (MLD) | Latvia | Clay | 1–2 | Loss |
| 2026 | Group III (Europe Zone) | Pool A | 12 Jun | Chișinău (MLD) | Azerbaijan | Clay | 2–0 | Win |
| 2026 | Group III (Europe Zone) | Promotion final | 13 Jun | Chișinău (MLD) | North Macedonia | Clay | 1–2 | Loss |
| 2027 | Group III (Europe Zone) | Pool A or B | TBD | TBD | TBD | TBD | TBD | TBD |

== Statistics ==
=== Home and away record ===
As of 14 June 2026

- Performance at home: 6–5 (55%) against 9 different opponents
- Performance away: 1–7 (13%) against 8 different opponents
- Performance at neutral venues: 35–17 (67%) against 24 different opponents
- Total: 42–29 (59%) against 30 different opponents

=== Head-to-head record ===
As of 14 June 2026 (after the 71st tie, a 1–2 loss against North Macedonia)

| Nation | Ties | W–L | Win % | Court Surface | | | | Setting | | Venue | | | Played | |
| Nation | Ties | W–L | Win % | Clay | Hard | Grass | Carpet | Indoor | Outdoor | Home | Away | Neutral | First | Last |
|---|---|---|---|---|---|---|---|---|---|---|---|---|---|---|
| Albania | 3 | 3–0 | 100% | 2–0 | 1–0 | — | — | — | 3–0 | — | — | 3–0 | 2010 | 2021 |
| Andorra | 3 | 3–0 | 100% | 1–0 | 2–0 | — | — | 1–0 | 2–0 | — | — | 3–0 | 2007 | 2017 |
| Armenia | 8 | 7–1 | 88% | 6–1 | 1–0 | — | — | — | 7–1 | 2–0 | 1–0 | 4–1 | 2007 | 2025 |
| Azerbaijan | 2 | 2–0 | 100% | 2–0 | — | — | — | — | 2–0 | — | — | 2–0 | 2021 | 2026 |
| Botswana | 1 | 1–0 | 100% | 1–0 | — | — | — | — | 1–0 | — | — | 1–0 | 2007 | (2007) |
| Bulgaria | 1 | 0–1 | 0% | 0–1 | — | — | — | — | 0–1 | — | 0–1 | — | 2008 | (2008) |
| China | 1 | 0–1 | 0% | — | 0–1 | — | — | 0–1 | — | — | 0–1 | — | 2025 | (2025) |
| Cyprus | 3 | 0–3 | 0% | 0–1 | 0–2 | — | — | 0–1 | 0–2 | 0–1 | 0–1 | 0–1 | 2016 | 2024 |
| Denmark | 1 | 0–1 | 0% | 0–1 | — | — | — | — | 0–1 | — | 0–1 | — | 2009 | (2009) |
| Estonia | 3 | 0–3 | 0% | 0–2 | 0–1 | — | — | — | 0–3 | — | — | 0–3 | 2015 | 2023 |
| Georgia | 2 | 1–1 | 50% | 1–1 | — | — | — | — | 1–1 | — | — | 1–1 | 2011 | 2014 |
| Greece | 4 | 2–2 | 50% | 1–1 | 1–1 | — | — | — | 2–2 | 1–0 | 0–1 | 1–1 | 2010 | 2018 |
| Ireland | 2 | 1–1 | 50% | 1–0 | 0–1 | — | — | — | 1–1 | — | — | 1–1 | 2017 | 2026 |
| Iceland | 2 | 2–0 | 100% | 1–0 | 1–0 | — | — | 1–0 | 1–0 | — | — | 2–0 | 2014 | 2016 |
| Ivory Coast | 1 | 1–0 | 100% | 1–0 | — | — | — | — | 1–0 | — | — | 1–0 | 2008 | (2008) |
| Kosovo | 1 | 1–0 | 100% | — | 1–0 | — | — | — | 1–0 | — | — | 1–0 | 2017 | (2017) |
| Latvia | 4 | 1–3 | 25% | 1–3 | — | — | — | — | 1–3 | 1–0 | — | 0–3 | 2018 | 2026 |
| Liechtenstein | 3 | 3–0 | 100% | 3–0 | — | — | — | — | 3–0 | — | — | 3–0 | 2013 | 2015 |
| Luxembourg | 2 | 0–2 | 0% | 0–2 | — | — | — | — | 0–2 | 0–1 | — | 0–1 | 2019 | 2022 |
| Madagascar | 1 | 1–0 | 100% | 1–0 | — | — | — | — | 1–0 | — | — | 1–0 | 2008 | (2008) |
| Malta | 4 | 4–0 | 100% | 3–0 | 1–0 | — | — | — | 4–0 | 1–0 | — | 3–0 | 2010 | 2025 |
| Moldova | 4 | 1–3 | 25% | 1–2 | 0–1 | — | — | — | 1–3 | 0–1 | — | 1–2 | 2010 | 2025 |
| Monaco | 1 | 0–1 | 0% | — | 0–1 | — | — | — | 0–1 | — | 0–1 | — | 2009 | (2009) |
| North Macedonia | 7 | 3–4 | 43% | 3–3 | 0–1 | — | — | 0–1 | 3–3 | 2–1 | 1–0 | 0–3 | 2012 | 2026 |
| Rwanda | 1 | 1–0 | 100% | 1–0 | — | — | — | — | 1–0 | — | — | 1–0 | 2007 | (2007) |
| San Marino ^{1} | 2 | 2–0 | 100% | — | 2–0 | — | — | — | 2–0 | — | — | 2–0 | 2010 | 2023 |
| Slovenia | 1 | 0–1 | 0% | 0–1 | — | — | — | — | 0–1 | 0–1 | — | — | 2024 | (2024) |
| South Africa | 1 | 0–1 | 0% | — | 0–1 | — | — | — | 0–1 | — | 0–1 | — | 2026 | (2026) |
| Turkey | 1 | 1–0 | 100% | 1–0 | — | — | — | — | 1–0 | — | — | 1–0 | 2008 | (2008) |
| Zimbabwe | 1 | 1–0 | 100% | 1–0 | — | — | — | — | 1–0 | — | — | 1–0 | 2008 | (2008) |
| 30 | 71 | 42–29 | 59% | 32–19 | 10–10 | 0–0 | 0–0 | 2–3 | 40–26 | 7–5 | 2–7 | 33–17 | 2007 | 2026 |
| Nations | Ties | W–L | Win % | Clay | Hard | Grass | Carpet | Indoor | Outdoor | Home | Away | Neutral | First | Last |

Notes

^{1} Does not include ties that were abandoned:
- 2013 tie with San Marino in the 5th-8th place playoffs

=== Ties by decade ===
| Decade | Played | Won | Lost | Win % |
|---|---|---|---|---|
| 2000–2009 | 11 | 8 | 3 | 72.7% |
| 2010–2019 | 36 | 22 | 14 | 61.1% |
| 2020–2025 | 24 | 12 | 12 | 50.0% |
| Total | 71 | 42 | 29 | 59.2% |

Note

Ties that were abandoned are not included in the tally:
- 2010-2019 (1 tie)

=== Host cities ===
As of 14 June 2026, only one city in Montenegro has hosted home turf ties.

| City | Ties | % |
|---|---|---|
| Ulcinj | 11 | 100.0% |

== See also ==
- Davis Cup
- Montenegro Billie Jean King Cup team
- Tennis Federation of Montenegro
