= George Tsivadze =

Georgian tennis player

George Tsivadze გიორგი ცივაძე
- Country (sports): Georgia
- Residence: Batumi, Georgia
- Born: 2 January 1993 (age 32) Batumi, Georgia
- Height: 1.91 m (6 ft 3 in)
- Plays: Left-handed (one handed-backhand)
- Prize money: $64,365

Singles
- Career record: 2–8
- Career titles: 0
- Highest ranking: No. 733 (22 June 2015)

Doubles
- Career record: 0–4
- Career titles: 8 ITF
- Highest ranking: No. 471 (14 August 2017)

Team competitions
- Davis Cup: 17–22

George Tsivadze (Georgian: გიორგი ცივაძე, romanized: giorgi tsivadze, pronounced [ɡioɾɡi tsivadze]; born 2 January 1993) is a Georgian tennis player.

Tsivadze has a career high ATP singles ranking of No. 733 achieved on 22 June 2015 and a career high ATP doubles ranking of No. 471 achieved on 14 August 2017. Tsivadze has won three ITF doubles titles.

Tsivadze has represented Georgia in the Davis Cup, where he has a W/L record of 17–21. Tsivadze won a remarkable Davis cup match against Finland, winning over Patrik Niklas-Salminen being down 5-2 40-15 in the fifth set and then returning to win 7-5 in the tiebreaker. The match was 5 hours and 49 minutes the longest Davis cup match in Georgia's history.

== Future and Challenger finals ==
=== Doubles 20 (8–12) ===
Legend (doubles) ATP Challenger Tour (0–0) ITF Futures Tour (8–12)	Titles by surface Hard (3–6) Clay (5–6) Grass (0–0) Carpet (0–0)

Result	W–L	Date	Tournament	Tier	Surface	Partner	Opponents	Score
Loss	0–1	Nov 2015	Egypt F39, Sharm El Sheikh	Futures	Hard	(Ukraine) Vladyslav Manafov	(Czech Republic) Tomáš Papik (Argentina) Santiago Rodriguez Taverna	2–6, 5–7
Win	1–1	Nov 2015	Egypt F41, Sharm El Sheikh	Futures	Hard	(Ukraine) Vladyslav Manafov	(Poland) Karol Drzewiecki (Poland) Maciej Smoła	6–2, 6–3
Loss	1–2	Aug 2016	(Georgia (country)) Georgia F3, Telavi	Futures	Clay	(Uzbekistan) Shonigmatjon Shofayziyev	(Australia) Thomas Fancutt (Australia) Mitchell William Robins	6–4, 3–6, [11–13]
Loss	1–3	Aug 2016	Belarus F3, Minsk	Futures	Hard	(Turkey) Anıl Yüksel	(United Kingdom) Scott Clayton (United Kingdom) Jonny O'Mara	4–6, 6–3, [11–13]
Win	2–3	Oct 2016	Kazakhstan F7, Shymkent	Futures	Clay	(Russia) Alexander Pavlioutchenkov	(Russia) Ivan Davydov (Kazakhstan) Roman Khassanov	6–1, 6–4
Loss	2–4	Nov 2016	Egypt F32, Sharm El Sheikh	Futures	Hard	(India) Shahbaaz Khan	(Ukraine) Vladyslav Manafov (Ukraine) Daniil Zarichanskyy	4–6, 6–7^{(6–8)}
Win	3–4	Nov 2016	Egypt F33, Sharm El Sheikh	Futures	Hard	(Ukraine) Vladyslav Orlov	(Italy) Antonio Massara (Poland) Mateusz Terczynski	7–6^{(7–2)}, 6–3
Loss	3–5	May 2017	Ukraine F1, Cherkasy	Futures	Clay	(Ukraine) Vladyslav Orlov	(Italy) Riccardo Bonadio (Italy) Pietro Rondoni	2–6, 5–7
Loss	3–6	Jul 2017	(Georgia (country)) Georgia F1, Telavi	Futures	Clay	(Georgia (country)) Aleksandre Bakshi	(Bolivia) Boris Arias (Bolivia) Federico Zeballos	6–7^{(8–10)}, 6–7^{(5–7)}
Loss	3–7	Dec 2017	Turkey F48, Antalya	Futures	Clay	(Ukraine) Vladyslav Orlov	(Netherlands) Glenn Smits (Netherlands) Colin van Beem	6–7^{(2–7)}, 2–6
Win	4–7	Jul 2018	(Georgia (country)) Georgia F1, Telavi	Futures	Clay	(Georgia (country)) Aleksandre Bakshi	(Kazakhstan) Roman Khassanov (Ukraine) Vladyslav Orlov	7–6^{(7–4)}, 6–3
Win	5–7	Jul 2018	(Georgia (country)) Georgia F3, Telavi	Futures	Clay	(Kazakhstan) Grigoriy Lomakin	(Ukraine) Vladyslav Orlov (Ukraine) Oleg Prihodko	6–7^{(8–10)}, 7–6^{(7–5)}, [10–8]
Win	6–7	Aug 2018	Belarus F3, Minsk	Futures	Hard	(Kazakhstan) Grigoriy Lomakin	(Czech Republic) Marek Gengel (Czech Republic) David Poljak	7–5, 7–6^{(7–4)}
Win	7–7	Sep 2018	Kazakhstan F8, Shymkent	Futures	Clay	(Kazakhstan) Grigoriy Lomakin	(Belarus) Aliaksandr Bury (Belarus) Maksim Zubkou	7–6^{(7–3)}, 6–3
Loss	7–8	May 2019	(Georgia (country)) Georgia M15, Tbilisi	World Tennis Tour	Hard	(Kazakhstan) Grigoriy Lomakin	(Czech Republic) Michal Konečný (Czech Republic) Ondřej Krstev	3–6, 3–6
Loss	7–9	Jul 2019	(Georgia (country)) Georgia M15, Telavi	World Tennis Tour	Clay	(Russia) Yan Bondarevskiy	(Turkey) Koray Kırcı (Czech Republic) David Poljak	5–7, 6–7^{(6–8)}
Loss	7–10	Aug 2019	(Georgia (country)) Georgia M15, Telavi	World Tennis Tour	Clay	(Russia) Yan Bondarevskiy	(Bulgaria) Alexander Donski (United States) Maksim Tikhomirov	4–6, 4–6
Win	8–10	Aug 2019	Ukraine M15, Irpin	World Tennis Tour	Clay	(Ukraine) Vladyslav Orlov	(Kazakhstan) Sagadat Ayap (Bulgaria) Vasko Mladenov	1–6, 6–3, [10–5]
Loss	8–11	Aug 2019	Belarus M15, Minsk	World Tennis Tour	Hard	(Kazakhstan) Sagadat Ayap	(Russia) Artem Dubrivnyy (Czech Republic) David Poljak	2–6, 2–6
Loss	8–12	Sep 2019	Kazakhstan M25, Almaty	World Tennis Tour	Hard	(Kazakhstan) Grigoriy Lomakin	(Belarus) Ivan Liutarevich (Ukraine) Vladyslav Manafov	5–7, 2–6
