= Ivan Saveljić =

Montenegrin tennis player

- Country (sports): Montenegro
- Residence: Podgorica, Montenegro
- Born: 17 August 1995 (age 29); Podgorica, Montenegro
- Height: 1.93 m (6 ft 4 in)
- Plays: Right-handed (two-handed backhand)
- College: NC State
- Prize money: $1,785

Singles
- Career record: 0–1 (at ATP Tour level, Grand Slam level, and in Davis Cup)
- Career titles: 0
- Highest ranking: No. 1828 (27 October 2014)

Doubles
- Career record: 3–4 (at ATP Tour level, Grand Slam level, and in Davis Cup)
- Career titles: 0
- Highest ranking: No. 1338 (17 November 2014)
- Last updated on: 10 September 2018.

Ivan Saveljić (born 17 August 1995) is a Montenegrin tennis player.

Saveljić has a career high ATP singles ranking of 1828 achieved on 27 October 2014. He also has a career high ATP doubles ranking of 1338 achieved on 17 November 2014.

Saveljić represents Montenegro at the Davis Cup, where he has a W/L record of 3–5.
