= Ljubomir Čelebić =

Montenegrin tennis player

- Country (sports): Montenegro
- Residence: Podgorica, Montenegro
- Born: 15 September 1991 (age 35) Podgorica, Montenegro
- Height: 1.75 m (5 ft 9 in)
- Plays: Left-handed (two-handed backhand)
- Prize money: $50,604

Singles
- Career record: 0–0 (at ATP Tour level, Grand Slam level)
- Career titles: 0; 0 Challenger, 2 Futures
- Highest ranking: No. 437 (31 July 2017)

Doubles
- Career record: 0–0 (at ATP Tour level, Grand Slam level)
- Career titles: 0; 0 Challenger, 6 Futures
- Highest ranking: No. 667 (19 June 2017)

Team competitions
- Davis Cup: 33–12

Ljubomir Čelebić (pronounced [ʎûbomiːr tʃelěbiːtɕ]; born 15 September 1991) is a Montenegrin former professional tennis player.

Čelebić reached his career high ATP singles ranking (No. 437) in 2017. He won 2 ITF singles title and 6 ITF doubles titles.

Čelebić represented Montenegro in the Davis Cup competitions, and is the nation's record holder in all five many categories in this competition (most total wins: 33, most singles wins: 21, most doubles wins: 12, most ties played: 33, and most years played: 10).

== Future and Challenger finals ==
=== Singles: 6 (2–4) ===
Legend
ATP Challengers 0 (0–0)
ITF Futures 6 (2–4)

Outcome	No.	Date	Tournament	Surface	Opponent	Score
Winner	1.	17 October 2015	Santa Margherita di Pula, Italy F31	Clay	(Italy) Omar Giacalone	7–6^{(7–3)}, 4–6, 6–2
Runner-up	2.	31 July 2016	Sombor, Serbia F2	Clay	(Croatia) Kristijan Mesaroš	3–6, 6–3, 3–6
Runner-up	3.	21 August 2016	Subotica, Serbia F5	Clay	(Bosnia and Herzegovina) Tomislav Brkić	4–6, 2–6
Runner-up	4.	11 September 2016	Zlatibor, Serbia F6	Clay	(Croatia) Kristijan Mesaroš	4–6, 0–1 RET
Winner	5.	12 February 2017	Hammamet, Tunisia F5	Clay	(Spain) Marc Giner	6–3, 6–2
Runner-up	6.	4 August 2019	Novi Sad, M15 Serbia	Clay	(Peru) Arklon Huertas del Pino	3–6, 6–7^{(2–7)}

=== Doubles 14 (6–8) ===
Legend
ATP Challengers 0 (0–0)
ITF Futures 14 (6–8)

Outcome	No.	Date	Tournament	Surface	Partner	Opponents	Score
Runner-up	1.	1 June 2014	Kiseljak, Bosnia and Herzegovina F4	Clay	(Italy) Giorgio Portaluri	(Bosnia and Herzegovina) Tomislav Brkić (Croatia) Ante Marinčić	2–6, 2–6
Runner-up	2.	22 June 2014	Belgrade, Serbia F2	Clay	(Serbia) Marko Djokovic	(Australia) Jake Eames (Australia) Gavin van Peperzeel	2–6, 0–6
Runner-up	3.	27 July 2014	Valjevo, Serbia F6	Clay	(Italy) Davide Melchiorre	(Hungary) Levente Gödry (Hungary) Péter Nagy	6–3, 4–6, [8–10]
Winner	4.	10 August 2014	Novi Sad, Serbia F8	Clay	(Italy) Davide Melchiorre	(Croatia) Dino Marcan (Croatia) Antonio Šančić	6–4, 4–6, [10–5]
Winner	5.	26 July 2015	Belgrade, Serbia F6	Clay	(Croatia) Antun Vidak	(Ukraine) Olexiy Kolisnyk (Ukraine) Anatoliy Petrenko	6–1, 6–2
Winner	6.	31 July 2016	Sombor, Serbia F2	Clay	(Bosnia and Herzegovina) Nerman Fatić	(Croatia) Domagoj Bilješko (Croatia) Borna Gojo	1–6, 6–3, [10–6]
Winner	7.	29 January 2017	Hammamet, Tunisia F3	Clay	(Montenegro) Rrezart Cungu	(Spain) Oriol Roca Batalla (Netherlands) Mark Vervoort	6–4, 6–3
Runner-up	8.	5 February 2017	Hammamet, Tunisia F4	Clay	(Italy) Davide Melchiorre	(Spain) Oriol Roca Batalla (Netherlands) Mark Vervoort	2–6, 4–6
Runner-up	9.	25 March 2018	Opatija, Croatia F3	Clay	(Hungary) Péter Nagy	(Argentina) Tomás Lipovšek Puches (Brazil) Bruno Sant'Anna	4–6, 1–6
Winner	10.	26 May 2018	Brčko, Bosnia and Herzegovina F2	Clay	(Bosnia and Herzegovina) Nerman Fatić	(Croatia) Duje Kekez (Croatia) Antun Vidak	2–6, 6–4, [10–7]
Runner-up	11.	12 May 2019	Prijedor, M25 Bosnia and Herzegovina	Clay	(Bosnia and Herzegovina) Nerman Fatić	(Netherlands) Igor Sijsling (Netherlands) Botic van de Zandschulp	6–3, 3–6, [4–10]
Runner-up	12.	19 May 2019	Doboj, M25 Bosnia and Herzegovina	Clay	(Bosnia and Herzegovina) Nerman Fatić	(Germany) Elmar Ejupovic (Germany) Robert Strombachs	w/o
Winner	13.	22 September 2019	Zlatibor, M15 Serbia	Clay	(Bosnia and Herzegovina) Nemanja Malešević	(Hungary) Mátyás Füle (Hungary) Gergely Madarász	6–3, 3–6, [10–4]
Runner-up	14.	1 March 2020	Heraklion, M15 Greece	Hard	(Montenegro) Igor Saveljić	(Germany) Constantin Schmitz (Germany) Kai Wehnelt	6–2, 4–6, [9–11]
