= North Macedonia Davis Cup team =

National tennis team

North Macedonia
- Captain: Goran Shevchenko
- ITF ranking: 78 (7 March 2026)
- Colors: Red & White
- First year: 1995
- Years played: 31
- Ties played (W–L): 112 (63–49)
- Best finish: Europe/Africa Zone Group I Quarterfinal (2008)
- Most total wins: Predrag Rusevski (47–31)
- Most singles wins: Predrag Rusevski (23–19)
- Most doubles wins: Predrag Rusevski (24–12)
- Most ties played: Predrag Rusevski (43)
- Most years played: Dimitar Grabul (17)

The North Macedonia Davis Cup team represents North Macedonia in Davis Cup tennis competition and is governed by the Macedonian Tennis Federation. Its previous official appellation used by the International Tennis Federation was "FYR Macedonia".

== Current team ==
The following players represented the team in 2026 Davis Cup ties.

- Marko Aleksovski (singles) [0–1]
- Amar Huseinović (singles, doubles) [0–1, 0–1]
- Kristijan Janev (singles) [0–1]
- Stefan Micov (singles, doubles) [0–1, 0–1]

== List of matches ==
=== 2020s ===
Year	Competition	Round	Date	Location	Opponent	Surface	Score	Result
2020–21	Group IV (Europe Zone)	Pool B	21 Jun	Skopje (MKD)	Kosovo	Clay	3–0	Win
2020–21	Group IV (Europe Zone)	Pool B	22 Jun	Skopje (MKD)	Andorra	Clay	3–0	Win
2020–21	Group IV (Europe Zone)	Pool B	23 Jun	Skopje (MKD)	San Marino	Clay	1–2	Loss
2020–21	Group IV (Europe Zone)	Pool B	25 Jun	Skopje (MKD)	Moldova	Clay	2–1	Win
2022	Group III (Europe Zone)	Pool B	21 Jun	Ulcinj (MNE)	Luxembourg	Clay	1–2	Loss
2022	Group III (Europe Zone)	Pool B	22 Jun	Ulcinj (MNE)	Montenegro	Clay	2–1	Win
2022	Group III (Europe Zone)	Pool B	23 Jun	Ulcinj (MNE)	Moldova	Clay	1–2	Loss
2022	Group III (Europe Zone)	Relegation playoffs	24 Jun	Ulcinj (MNE)	Liechtenstein	Clay	2–0	Win
2023	Group III (Europe Zone)	Pool B	13 Jun	Larnaca (CYP)	Malta	Hard	2–1	Win
2023	Group III (Europe Zone)	Pool B	14 Jun	Larnaca (CYP)	Moldova	Hard	0–3	Loss
2023	Group III (Europe Zone)	Pool B	15 Jun	Larnaca (CYP)	Cyprus	Hard	0–3	Loss
2023	Group III (Europe Zone)	Relegation playoffs	16 Jun	Larnaca (CYP)	San Marino	Hard	2–1	Win
2024	Group III (Europe Zone)	Pool A	18 Jun	Ulcinj (MNE)	Montenegro	Clay	0–3	Loss
2024	Group III (Europe Zone)	Pool A	19 Jun	Ulcinj (MNE)	Slovenia	Clay	2–1	Win
2024	Group III (Europe Zone)	Promotion final	21 Jun	Ulcinj (MNE)	Kosovo	Clay	0–2	Loss
2025	Group III (Europe Zone)	Playoffs	9 Jun	Skopje (MKD)	Malta	Clay	3–0	Win
2025	Group III (Europe Zone)	Playoffs	10 Jun	Skopje (MKD)	Montenegro	Clay	0–3	Loss
2025	Group III (Europe Zone)	Playoffs	11 Jun	Skopje (MKD)	Moldova	Clay	2–1	Win
2025	Group III (Europe Zone)	Playoffs	12 Jun	Skopje (MKD)	Armenia	Clay	3–0	Win
2025	Group III (Europe Zone)	Playoffs	13 Jun	Skopje (MKD)	Latvia	Clay	1–2	Loss
2026	World Group II	Playoffs	6–8 Feb	Nicosia (CYP)	Cyprus	Hard	0–5	Loss
2026	Group III (Europe Zone)	Pool TBD	TBD	TBD (TBD)	TBD	TBD	TBD	TBD
2026	Group III (Europe Zone)	Pool TBD	TBD	TBD (TBD)	TBD	TBD	TBD	TBD
2026	Group III (Europe Zone)	Pool TBD	TBD	TBD (TBD)	TBD	TBD	TBD	TBD
2026	Group III (Europe Zone)	TBD	TBD	TBD (TBD)	TBD	TBD	TBD	TBD

== See also ==
- Davis Cup
- North Macedonia Billie Jean King Cup team
