= Latvia Davis Cup team =

Davis Cup team representing Latvia

Latvia
- Captain: Kārlis Lejnieks
- Nations Ranking: 69 ▼3 (20 September 2021)
- Colors: White & red
- First year: 1993
- Years played: 21
- Ties played (W–L): 55 (34-20)
- Best finish: Europe/Africa Zone Group I 1st round (2008, 2010, 2014)
- Most total wins: Andis Juška (36-28)
- Most singles wins: Andis Juška (23-19)
- Most doubles wins: Andris Fiļimonovs (18-6)
- Best doubles team: Andris Fiļimonovs & Ģirts Dzelde (7-4)
- Most ties played: Andis Juška (31)
- Most years played: Andis Juška (13)

The Latvia men's national tennis team represents Latvia in Davis Cup tennis competition and are governed by the Latvian Tennis Union. Team is coached by Ģirts Dzelde.

Latvia after winning tie against Slovenia returned to the Europe/Africa Zone of Group I. They previously played in the Group I 2008.

== History ==
Latvia competed in its first Davis Cup in 1993 following the country finally winning its freedom from Soviet occupation. Before independence, Latvian players represented their occupier.

== Current team (2022) ==
- Ernests Gulbis
- Robert Strombachs
- Kārlis Ozoliņš
- Daniels Tens (Junior player)
- Miķelis Lībietis (Doubles player)

== Results ==
| Year | Competition | | Date | Location | Opponent | Score | Result |
|---|---|---|---|---|---|---|---|
| 2001 | Europe/Africa Group III | Round Robin | 20 May | Gaborone (BOT) | Ghana | 3-0 | Won |
| 2001 | Europe/Africa Group III | Round Robin | 19 May | Gaborone (BOT) | Lithuania | 2-1 | Won |
| 2001 | Europe/Africa Group III | Round Robin | 18 May | Gaborone (BOT) | Kenya | 2-1 | Won |
| 2001 | Europe/Africa Group III | Round Robin | 17 May | Gaborone (BOT) | (Georgia (country)) Georgia | 3-0 | Won |
| 2001 | Europe/Africa Group III | Round Robin | 16 May | Gaborone (BOT) | Madagascar | 3-0 | Won |
| 2000 | Europe/Africa Group II | First round Play-offs | 16 May | Mondorf (LUX) | Luxembourg | 1-4 | Lost |
| 2000 | Europe/Africa Group II | First round | 28–30 April | Jurmala (LAT) | Croatia | 0-5 | Lost |
| 1999 | Europe/Africa Group II | First round Play-offs | 16–18 July | Jurmala (LAT) | (North Macedonia) Macedonia | 4-1 | Won |
| 1999 | Europe/Africa Group II | First round | 30 April-2 May | Jurmala (LAT) | Poland | 2-3 | Lost |
| 1998 | Europe/Africa Group II | First round Play-offs | 17–19 July | Jurmala (LAT) | (Georgia (country)) Georgia | 5-0 | Won |
| 1998 | Europe/Africa Group II | First round | 1–3 May | Jurmala (LAT) | (Federal Republic of Yugoslavia) Yugoslavia | 2-3 | Lost |
| 1997 | Europe/Africa Group II | First round Play-offs | 11–13 July | Jurmala (LAT) | Ghana | 4-1 | Won |
| 1997 | Europe/Africa Group II | First round | 2–4 May | Abidjan (CIV) | Ivory Coast | 0-5 | Lost |
| 1996 | Europe/Africa Group II | First round Play-offs | 12–14 July | Skopje (MKD) | (North Macedonia) Macedonia | 4-1 | Won |
| 1996 | Europe/Africa Group II | First round | 3–5 May | Jurmala (LAT) | Ivory Coast | 2-3 | Lost |
| 1995 | Europe/Africa Group II | Quarterfinals | 14–16 July | Jurmala (LAT) | Ukraine | 2-3 | Lost |
| 1995 | Europe/Africa Group II | First round | 28–30 April | Tallinn (EST) | Estonia | 3-2 | Won |
| 1994 | Europe/Africa Group II | Semifinals | 23–25 September | Jurmala (LAT) | Morocco | 1-4 | Lost |
| 1994 | Europe/Africa Group II | Quarterfinals | 15–17 July | Jurmala (LAT) | Ukraine | 3-2 | Won |
| 1994 | Europe/Africa Group II | First Round | 29 April-1 May | Nairobi (KEN) | Kenya | 3-1 | Won |
| 1993 | Europe/Africa Group III | Round Robin | 2 May | Lusaka (ZAM) | (Republic of the Congo) Congo | 3-0 | Won |
| 1993 | Europe/Africa Group III | Round Robin | 1 May | Lusaka (ZAM) | Slovenia | 2-1 | Won |
| 1993 | Europe/Africa Group III | Round Robin | 30 April | Lusaka (ZAM) | Zambia | 3-0 | Won |
| 1993 | Europe/Africa Group III | Round Robin | 29 April | Lusaka (ZAM) | San Marino | 3-0 | Won |
| 1993 | Europe/Africa Group III | Round Robin | 28 April | Lusaka (ZAM) | Turkey | 3-0 | Won |

== See also ==
- Davis Cup
- Latvia Billie Jean King Cup team
