= Iceland Davis Cup team =

National tennis team

Iceland
- Captain: Birkir Gunnarsson
- ITF ranking: 90 ▲23
- First year: 1996
- Years played: 24
- Ties played (W–L): 103 (41–61)
- Most total wins: Arnar Sigurdsson (64)
- Most singles wins: Arnar Sigurdsson (39)
- Most doubles wins: Arnar Sigurdsson (25)
- Best doubles team: Arnar Sigurdsson & David Halldorsson (9)
- Most ties played: Arnar Sigurdsson (54)
- Most years played: Arnar Sigurdsson (13)
- Last updated on: 22 June 2020.

The Iceland Davis Cup team represents Iceland in Davis Cup tennis competition and are governed by the Icelandic Tennis Association.

Iceland currently compete in the fourth group of Europe Zone.

== History ==
Iceland competed in its first Davis Cup in 1996.

== Current team (2022) ==
- Egill Sigurdsson
- Rafn Bonifacius (Captain-player)
- Daniel Siddall
- Sigurbjartur Atlason

== See also ==
- Davis Cup
- Iceland Billie Jean King Cup team
