= Georgia Davis Cup team =

Georgian national tennis team

Georgia
- Captain: Vladimir Gabrichidze
- ITF ranking: T-84
- Colors: Red & White
- First year: 1994
- Years played: 20
- Ties played (W–L): 70 (43–27)
- Best finish: Europe/Africa Zone Group I quarterfinal
- Most total wins: Irakli Ushangishvili (29–15)
- Most singles wins: Irakli Ushangishvili (19–9)
- Most doubles wins: Irakli Labadze (12–5)
- Best doubles team: Irakli Labadze / Lado Chikhladze (9–4)
- Most ties played: Irakli Ushangishvili (28)
- Most years played: Irakli Labadze (8)

The Georgia men's national tennis team represents Georgia in Davis Cup tennis competition and is governed by the Georgian Tennis Federation.

Georgia currently competes in the third group of Europe Zone. Their best result was in 2007 reaching the quarterfinals in the first group of Europe and Africa zone.

== History ==
Georgia competed in its first Davis Cup in 1995. Georgian players previously represented the USSR.

== Team (2022) ==
- Aleksandre Metreveli
- Saba Purtseladze
- Aleksandre Bakshi
- Zura Tkemaladze

== See also ==
- Davis Cup
- Georgia Billie Jean King Cup team
