= Malta Davis Cup team =

National tennis team

Malta
- Captain: Stephen Caruana
- Nations Ranking: 110 ▲4
- First year: 1986
- Years played: 23
- Ties played (W–L): 76 (25–51)
- Most total wins: Gordon Asciak (37)
- Most singles wins: Gordon Asciak (17)
- Most doubles wins: Gordon Asciak (20)
- Best doubles team: Gordon Asciak & Mark Schembri (13)
- Most ties played: Gordon Asciak (40)
- Most years played: Gordon Asciak (14)

The Malta men's national tennis team represents Malta in Davis Cup tennis competition and are governed by the Malta Tennis Federation.

Malta currently compete in the Europe/Africa Zone of Group IV.

== History ==
Malta competed in its first Davis Cup in 1986.

== Current team (2022) ==
- Liam Delicata
- Matthew Asciak
- Alex Degabriele (Junior player)
- Dwayne Lukas Pullicino (Junior player)

== See also ==
- Davis Cup
- Malta Billie Jean King Cup team
