= Greece Davis Cup team =

National sports team

Greece
- Captain: George Kalovelonis
- ITF ranking: 60 (6 December 2021)
- First year: 1927
- Years played: 71
- Ties played (W–L): 150 (71–79)
- Years in World Group: 1 (0–1)
- Best finish: Europe/Africa Zone Group I quarterfinal
- Most total wins: Konstantinos Economidis (44–20)
- Most singles wins: Konstantinos Economidis (26–10)
- Most doubles wins: Konstantinos Economidis (18–10)
- Best doubles team: Konstantinos Economidis & Anastasios Vasiliadis (6–4)
- Most ties played: Konstantinos Economidis (37)
- Most years played: Nicky Kalogeropoulos (19)

The Greece men's national tennis team represents Greece in Davis Cup tennis competition and are governed by the Hellenic Tennis Federation.

Greece currently compete in Europe Zone Group III. They have never competed in the World Group, but reached the European Zone quarterfinals three times.

== Current team (2022) ==
- Stefanos Tsitsipas
- Michail Pervolarakis
- Petros Tsitsipas
- Aristotelis Thanos
- Alexandros Skorilas

== History ==
Greece competed in its first Davis Cup in 1927. Some of their present and past players include Solon Peppas, Konstantinos Economidis, Alex Jakupovic, Anastasios Bavelas, Vasilis Mazarakis, George Kalovelonis, and Paris Gemouchidis.

== See also ==
- Davis Cup
- Greece Billie Jean King Cup team
- Greece at the Hopman Cup
