= Luxembourg Davis Cup team =

National tennis team

Luxembourg
- Captain: Gilles Müller
- ITF ranking: 41 ▲
- Colors: Red and White
- First year: 1947
- Years played: 76
- Ties played (W–L): 138 (59–79)
- Best finish: World Group I play-offs (2024)
- Most total wins: Gilles Müller (56–17)
- Most singles wins: Gilles Müller (35–11)
- Most doubles wins: Mike Scheidweiler (23–13)
- Best doubles team: Gilles Müller / Mike Scheidweiler (17–5)
- Most ties played: Mike Scheidweiler (41)
- Most years played: Johny Goudenbour (18)

The Luxembourg men's national tennis team represents Luxembourg in Davis Cup tennis competition and are governed by the Luxembourg Tennis Federation.

Luxembourg will compete in the World Group I play-offs in 2024; the highest level they ever reached.

== History ==
Luxembourg competed in its first Davis Cup in 1947, losing its first 17 matches until beating Turkey in 1965.

== Current team (2024) ==
- Alex Knaff (18)
- Chris Rodesch (17)
- Raphael Calzi (9)
- Gilles Kremer (31)
- Aaron Gil Garcia (0)

Numbers indicate number of ties played.

== Captain ==
- Roger Wilwert (1947, 1949-1950)
- Paul Decker (1948)
- Leon Lefevre (1951)
- Marcel Bove (1952, 1954-1957)
- Victor Klees (1953)
- Geza Wertheim (1958-1964)
- Gaston Wampach (1965, 1966)
- Ferdinand Weyler (1965)
- Georges Weyrich(1967-1968, 1974)
- Frank Baden (1969-1970, 1972)
- Joseph Offenheim (1971, 1975)
- Fernand Houblie (1971, 1973)
- Joa Neuman (1976)
- Ernest Betzen (1989)
- Pavel Korda (1989)
- Ladislav Tyra (1990-1993)
- Adrien Graimprey (1993)
- Laurent Marty (1995-1999)
- Johny Goudenbour (2001-2007)
- Jacques Radoux (2008-2013)
- Johny Goudenbour (2014-2018)
- Gilles Müller (2019-current)

== See also ==
- Davis Cup
- Luxembourg Billie Jean King Cup team
