= 2005 Davis Cup Europe/Africa Zone Group III – Zone A =

International tennis competition

The Europe/Africa Zone was one of the three zones of the regional Davis Cup competition in 2005.

In the Europe/Africa Zone there were four different tiers, called groups, in which teams competed against each other to advance to the upper tier. Group III was split into two tournaments. One tournament was held in Smash Tennis Academy, Cairo, Egypt, April 27–May 1, on outdoor clay courts, while the other was held in Fitzwilliam Lawn Tennis Club, Dublin, Ireland, July 13–17, on outdoor grass courts.

== Format ==
The eight teams in the Cairo tournament were split into two pools and played in a round-robin format. The top two teams of each pool advanced to the promotion pool, from which the two top teams were promoted to the Europe/Africa Zone Group II in 2006. The bottom two teams of each group were placed in the relegation pool, from which the two bottom teams were demoted to the Europe/Africa Zone Group IV in 2006.

== Pool A ==
	Pool A	MKD	DEN	NAM	KEN
1	North Macedonia (3–0)		3–0	3–0	3–0
2	Denmark (2–1)	0–3		3–0	3–0
3	Namibia (1–2)	0–3	0–3		2–1
4	Kenya (0–3)	0–3	0–3	1–2	

=== Denmark vs. Kenya ===
Denmark
3
Smash Tennis Academy, Cairo, Egypt
27 April 2005
Clay

Kenya
0

			1	2	3
1	(Denmark) (Kenya)	Mik Ledvonova; Christian Vitulli	6; 3	6; 3
2	(Denmark) (Kenya)	Frederik Nielsen; Allan Cooper	6; 0	6; 4
3	(Denmark) (Kenya)	Frederik Nielsen / Morgan Thempler; Willis Mbandi / Christian Vitulli	6; 2	6; 2

=== North Macedonia vs. Namibia ===
North Macedonia
3
Smash Tennis Academy, Cairo, Egypt
27 April 2005
Clay

Namibia
0

			1	2	3
1	(North Macedonia) (Namibia)	Predrag Rusevski; Johan Theron	6; 0	6; 3
2	(North Macedonia) (Namibia)	Lazar Magdinčev; Jurgens Strydom	6; 4	6; 0
3	(North Macedonia) (Namibia)	Lazar Magdinčev / Predrag Rusevski; Henrico Du Plessis / Jurgens Strydom	6; 1	6; 1

=== Denmark vs. Namibia ===
Denmark
3
Smash Tennis Academy, Cairo, Egypt
28 April 2005
Clay

Namibia
0

			1	2	3
1	(Denmark) (Namibia)	Mik Ledvonova; Johan Theron	6; 2	6; 2
2	(Denmark) (Namibia)	Frederik Nielsen; Jurgens Strydom	6; 0	6; 2
3	(Denmark) (Namibia)	Frederik Nielsen / Morgan Thempler; Henrico Du Plessis / Jean-Pierre Huish	6; 2	6; 2

=== North Macedonia vs. Kenya ===
North Macedonia
3
Smash Tennis Academy, Cairo, Egypt
28 April 2005
Clay

Kenya
0

			1	2	3
1	(North Macedonia) (Kenya)	Predrag Rusevski; Willis Mbandi	6; 0	6; 0
2	(North Macedonia) (Kenya)	Lazar Magdinčev; Allan Cooper	6; 1	6; 1
3	(North Macedonia) (Kenya)	Dimitar Grabul / Predrag Rusevski; Allan Cooper / Maurice Wamukowa	6; 2	6; 3

=== Denmark vs. North Macedonia ===
Denmark
0
Smash Tennis Academy, Cairo, Egypt
29 April 2005
Clay

North Macedonia
3

			1	2	3
1	(Denmark) (North Macedonia)	Mik Ledvonova; Predrag Rusevski	7; 5	3; 6	2; 6
2	(Denmark) (North Macedonia)	Frederik Nielsen; Lazar Magdinčev	1; 6	6^{3} 7^{7}
3	(Denmark) (North Macedonia)	Frederik Nielsen / Morgan Thempler; Lazar Magdinčev / Predrag Rusevski	2; 6	3; 6

=== Namibia vs. Kenya ===
Namibia
2
Smash Tennis Academy, Cairo, Egypt
29 April 2005
Clay

Kenya
1

			1	2	3
1	(Namibia) (Kenya)	Johan Theron; Christian Vitulli	1; 6	6; 4	3; 6
2	(Namibia) (Kenya)	Jurgens Strydom; Allan Cooper	6^{7} 7^{9}	6; 3	6; 3
3	(Namibia) (Kenya)	Henrico Du Plessis / Jurgens Strydom; Allan Cooper / Christian Vitulli	6^{4} 7^{7}	6; 2	6; 4

== Pool B ==
	Pool B	EGY	BIH	LTU	MAD
1	Egypt (3–0)		3–0	2–1	3–0
2	Bosnia and Herzegovina (2–1)	0–3		2–1	2–1
3	Lithuania (1–2)	1–2	1–2		3–0
4	Madagascar (0–2)	0–3	1–2	0–3	

=== Egypt vs. Madagascar ===
Egypt
3
Smash Tennis Academy, Cairo, Egypt
27 April 2005
Clay

Madagascar
0

			1	2	3
1	(Egypt) (Madagascar)	Mohamed Mamoun; Jacob Rasolondrazana	6; 1	6; 2
2	(Egypt) (Madagascar)	Karim Maamoun; Germain Rasolondrazana	6; 2	6; 0
3	(Egypt) (Madagascar)	Omar Hedayet / Mohamed Nashaat; Thierry Rajaobelina / Germain Rasolondrazana	6; 3	7^{7} 6^{4}

=== Lithuania vs. Bosnia and Herzegovina ===
Lithuania
1
Smash Tennis Academy, Cairo, Egypt
27 April 2005
Clay

Bosnia and Herzegovina
2

			1	2	3
1	(Lithuania) (Bosnia and Herzegovina)	Rolandas Muraška; Bojan Vujić	3; 6	6; 3	0; 6
2	(Lithuania) (Bosnia and Herzegovina)	Daniel Lencina-Ribes; Ivan Dodig	6; 4	7^{7} 6^{5}
3	(Lithuania) (Bosnia and Herzegovina)	Daniel Lencina-Ribes / Rolandas Muraška; Ivan Dodig / Bojan Vujić	4; 6	2; 6

=== Egypt vs. Bosnia and Herzegovina ===
Egypt
3
Smash Tennis Academy, Cairo, Egypt
28 April 2005
Clay

Bosnia and Herzegovina
0

			1	2	3
1	(Egypt) (Bosnia and Herzegovina)	Mohamed Mamoun; Bojan Vujić	6; 4	6; 4
2	(Egypt) (Bosnia and Herzegovina)	Karim Maamoun; Ivan Dodig	5; 7	6; 2	6; 4
3	(Egypt) (Bosnia and Herzegovina)	Karim Maamoun / Mohamed Mamoun; Ivan Dodig / Bojan Vujić	6; 1	6; 4

=== Lithuania vs. Madagascar ===
Lithuania
3
Smash Tennis Academy, Cairo, Egypt
28 April 2005
Clay

Madagascar
0

			1	2	3
1	(Lithuania) (Madagascar)	Gvidas Sabeckis; Thierry Rajaobelina	6; 1	6; 3
2	(Lithuania) (Madagascar)	Daniel Lencina-Ribes; Germain Rasolondrazana	6; 3	6; 3
3	(Lithuania) (Madagascar)	Rolandas Muraška / Gvidas Sabeckis; Antso Rakotondramanga / Germain Rasolondrazana	6; 2	7^{9} 6^{7}

=== Egypt vs. Lithuania ===
Egypt
2
Smash Tennis Academy, Cairo, Egypt
29 April 2005
Clay

Lithuania
1

			1	2	3
1	(Egypt) (Lithuania)	Mohamed Mamoun; Rolandas Muraška	6; 0	1; 6	3; 6
2	(Egypt) (Lithuania)	Karim Maamoun; Daniel Lencina-Ribes	6; 2	7^{7} 6^{3}
3	(Egypt) (Lithuania)	Karim Maamoun / Mohamed Mamoun; Rolandas Muraška / Gvidas Sabeckis	4; 6	7^{9} 6^{7}	6; 4

=== Bosnia and Herzegovina vs. Madagascar ===
Bosnia and Herzegovina
2
Smash Tennis Academy, Cairo, Egypt
29 April 2005
Clay

Madagascar
1

			1	2	3
1	(Bosnia and Herzegovina) (Madagascar)	Bojan Vujić; Antso Rakotondramanga	6; 2	6; 2
2	(Bosnia and Herzegovina) (Madagascar)	Ivan Dodig; Jacob Rasolondrazana	6; 3	3; 6	6; 3
3	(Bosnia and Herzegovina) (Madagascar)	Aleksandar Marić / Uglješa Ostojić; Thierry Rajaobelina / Germain Rasolondrazana	3; 6	3; 6

== Promotion pool ==
The top two teams from each of Pools A and B advanced to the Promotion pool. Results and points from games against the opponent from the preliminary round were carried forward.

(scores in italics carried over from Groups)

	1st–4th Play-off	MKD	EGY	DEN	BIH
1	North Macedonia (3–0)		2–1	3–0	3–0
2	Egypt (2–1)	1–2		2–1	3–0
3	Denmark (1–2)	0–3	1–2		2–1
4	Bosnia and Herzegovina (0–3)	0–3	0–3	1–2	

North Macedonia and Egypt promoted to Group II in 2006.

=== North Macedonia vs. Bosnia and Herzegovina ===
North Macedonia
3
Smash Tennis Academy, Cairo, Egypt
30 April 2005
Clay

Bosnia and Herzegovina
0

			1	2	3
1	(North Macedonia) (Bosnia and Herzegovina)	Predrag Rusevski; Bojan Vujić	6; 2	6; 0
2	(North Macedonia) (Bosnia and Herzegovina)	Lazar Magdinčev; Ivan Dodig	6; 2	6; 2
3	(North Macedonia) (Bosnia and Herzegovina)	Lazar Magdinčev / Predrag Rusevski; Aleksandar Marić / Uglješa Ostojić	6; 1	7; 5

=== Denmark vs. Egypt ===
Denmark
1
Smash Tennis Academy, Cairo, Egypt
30 April 2005
Clay

Egypt
2

			1	2	3
1	(Denmark) (Egypt)	Mik Ledvonova; Mohamed Mamoun	2; 6	3; 6
2	(Denmark) (Egypt)	Frederik Nielsen; Karim Maamoun	6; 4	6; 3
3	(Denmark) (Egypt)	Frederik Nielsen / Morgan Thempler; Karim Maamoun / Mohamed Mamoun	2; 6	6; 2	3; 6

=== North Macedonia vs. Egypt ===
North Macedonia
2
Smash Tennis Academy, Cairo, Egypt
1 May 2005
Clay

Egypt
1

			1	2	3
1	(North Macedonia) (Egypt)	Dimitar Grabul; Omar Hedayet	3; 6	3; 6
2	(North Macedonia) (Egypt)	Predrag Rusevski; Mohamed Nashaat	6; 4	6; 2
3	(North Macedonia) (Egypt)	Lazar Magdinčev / Predrag Rusevski; Mohamed Mamoun / Mohamed Nashaat	2; 6	6; 4	6; 3

=== Denmark vs. Bosnia and Herzegovina ===
Denmark
2
Smash Tennis Academy, Cairo, Egypt
1 May 2005
Clay

Bosnia and Herzegovina
1

			1	2	3
1	(Denmark) (Bosnia and Herzegovina)	Jacob Melskens; Aleksandar Marić	6; 4	2; 6	6; 4
2	(Denmark) (Bosnia and Herzegovina)	Frederik Nielsen; Uglješa Ostojić	6; 1	6; 0
3	(Denmark) (Bosnia and Herzegovina)	Jacob Melskens / Morgan Thempler; Aleksandar Marić / Bojan Vujić	2; 6	6^{2} 7^{7}

== Relegation pool ==
The bottom two teams from Pools A and B were placed in the relegation group. Results and points from games against the opponent from the preliminary round were carried forward.

(scores in italics carried over from Groups)

	5th–8th Play-off	LTU	NAM	MAD	KEN
1	Lithuania (3–0)		2–1	3–0	3–0
2	Namibia (2–1)	1–2		2–1	2–1
3	Madagascar (1–2)	0–3	1–2		3–0
4	Kenya (0–3)	0–3	1–2	0–3	

Madagascar and Kenya relegated to Group IV in 2006.

=== Namibia vs. Madagascar ===
Namibia
2
Smash Tennis Academy, Cairo, Egypt
30 April 2005
Clay

Madagascar
1

			1	2	3
1	(Namibia) (Madagascar)	Johan Theron; Thierry Rajaobelina	7; 5	2; 6	6; 3
2	(Namibia) (Madagascar)	Jurgens Strydom; Germain Rasolondrazana	6; 2	6; 3
3	(Namibia) (Madagascar)	Henrico Du Plessis / Jurgens Strydom; Antso Rakotondramanga / Germain Rasolondrazana	3; 6	6; 3	4; 6

=== Lithuania vs. Kenya ===
Lithuania
3
Smash Tennis Academy, Cairo, Egypt
30 April 2005
Clay

Kenya
0

			1	2	3
1	(Lithuania) (Kenya)	Gvidas Sabeckis; Christian Vitulli	6; 3	6^{4} 7^{7}	6; 4
2	(Lithuania) (Kenya)	Daniel Lencina-Ribes; Allan Cooper	6; 1	5; 7	9; 7
3	(Lithuania) (Kenya)	Artūras Gotovskis / Rolandas Muraška; Christian Vitulli / Maurice Wamukowa	3; 6	6; 2	6; 0

=== Namibia vs. Lithuania ===
Namibia
1
Smash Tennis Academy, Cairo, Egypt
1 May 2005
Clay

Lithuania
2

			1	2	3
1	(Namibia) (Lithuania)	Jean-Pierre Huish; Artūras Gotovskis	6; 1	6; 3
2	(Namibia) (Lithuania)	Jurgens Strydom; Rolandas Muraška	2; 6	2; 6
3	(Namibia) (Lithuania)	Jean-Pierre Huish / Jurgens Strydom; Daniel Lencina-Ribes / Rolandas Muraška	6^{6} 7^{8}	1; 6

=== Kenya vs. Madagascar ===
Kenya
0
Smash Tennis Academy, Cairo, Egypt
1 May 2005
Clay

Madagascar
3

			1	2	3
1	(Kenya) (Madagascar)	Maurice Wamukowa; Antso Rakotondramanga	3; 6	5; 7
2	(Kenya) (Madagascar)	Willis Mbandi; Germain Rasolondrazana	2; 6	1; 6
3	(Kenya) (Madagascar)	Willis Mbandi / Maurice Wamukowa; Antso Rakotondramanga / Germain Rasolondrazana	4; 6	2; 6

== Final standings ==
Rank	Team
1	North Macedonia
2	Egypt
3	Denmark
4	Bosnia and Herzegovina
5	Lithuania
6	Namibia
7	Madagascar
8	Kenya

- North Macedonia and Egypt promoted to Group II in 2006.
- Madagascar and Kenya relegated to Group IV in 2006.
