= 2002 Davis Cup Europe/Africa Zone Group III – Zone B =

International tennis competition

The Europe/Africa Zone was one of the three zones of the regional Davis Cup competition in 2002.

In the Europe/Africa Zone there were four different tiers, called groups, in which teams competed against each other to advance to the upper tier. Group III was split into two tournaments. One tournament was held in Arka TC, Gdynia, Poland, May 8–12, while the other was held in Antalya, Turkey, April 3–7.

== Format ==
The eight teams in the Antalya tournament were split into two pools and played in a round-robin format. The top two teams of each pool advanced to the promotion pool, from which the two top teams were promoted to the Europe/Africa Zone Group II in 2003. The bottom two teams of each group were placed in the relegation pool, from which the two bottom teams were demoted to the Europe/Africa Zone Group IV in 2003.

== Pool A ==
	Pool A	MON	AND	LTU	NAM
1	Monaco (3–0)		2–1	3–0	3–0
2	Andorra (2–1)	1–2		2–1	2–1
3	Lithuania (1–2)	0–3	1–2		3–0
4	Namibia (0–3)	0–3	1–2	0–3	

=== Monaco vs. Namibia ===
Monaco
3
Antalya, Turkey
3 April 2002

Namibia
0

			1	2	3
1	(Monaco) (Namibia)	Christophe Bosio; Henrico Du Plessis	6; 3	3; 6	8; 6
2	(Monaco) (Namibia)	Guillaume Couillard; Johan Theron	6; 2	6; 0
3	(Monaco) (Namibia)	Christophe Bosio / Emmanuel Heussner; Henrico Du Plessis / Johan Theron	3; 6	6; 4	6; 4

=== Andorra vs. Lithuania ===
Andorra
2
Antalya, Turkey
3 April 2002

Lithuania
1

			1	2	3
1	(Andorra) (Lithuania)	Jean-Baptiste Poux-Gautier; Aivaras Balžekas	2; 6	3; 6
2	(Andorra) (Lithuania)	Joan Jiménez Guerra; Rolandas Muraška	6; 4	7; 5
3	(Andorra) (Lithuania)	Joan Jiménez Guerra / Jean-Baptiste Poux-Gautier; Rolandas Muraška / Gvidas Sabeckis	6; 4	7^{7} 6^{2}

=== Monaco vs. Andorra ===
Monaco
2
Antalya, Turkey
4 April 2002

Andorra
1

			1	2	3
1	(Monaco) (Andorra)	Emmanuel Heussner; Jean-Baptiste Poux-Gautier	6; 4	6; 3
2	(Monaco) (Andorra)	Guillaume Couillard; Joan Jiménez Guerra	6^{3} 7^{7}	7; 5	4; 6
3	(Monaco) (Andorra)	Christophe Bosio / Emmanuel Heussner; Joan Jiménez Guerra / Kenneth Tuilier-Curco	7; 5	4; 6	6; 3

=== Namibia vs. Lithuania ===
Namibia
0
Antalya, Turkey
4 April 2002

Lithuania
3

			1	2	3
1	(Namibia) (Lithuania)	Henrico Du Plessis; Aivaras Balžekas	2; 6	1; 6
2	(Namibia) (Lithuania)	Johan Theron; Rolandas Muraška	1; 6	1; 6
3	(Namibia) (Lithuania)	Nicky Buys / Jean-Pierre Huish; Rolandas Muraška / Gvidas Sabeckis	4; 6	3; 6

=== Monaco vs. Lithuania ===
Monaco
3
Antalya, Turkey
5 April 2002

Lithuania
0

			1	2	3
1	(Monaco) (Lithuania)	Emmanuel Heussner; Aivaras Balžekas	7; 5	3; 6	6; 1
2	(Monaco) (Lithuania)	Guillaume Couillard; Rolandas Muraška	6; 2	6; 2
3	(Monaco) (Lithuania)	Christophe Boggetti / Christophe Bosio; Aivaras Balžekas / Gvidas Sabeckis	7; 5	7; 5

=== Andorra vs. Namibia ===
Andorra
2
Antalya, Turkey
5 April 2002

Namibia
1

			1	2	3
1	(Andorra) (Namibia)	Kenneth Tuilier-Curco; Nicky Buys	6; 1	6; 0
2	(Andorra) (Namibia)	Joan Jiménez Guerra; Jean-Pierre Huish	6; 2	6; 0
3	(Andorra) (Namibia)	Joan Jiménez Guerra / Jean-Baptiste Poux-Gautier; Henrico Du Plessis / Johan Theron	0; 3			retired

== Pool B ==
	Pool B	BIH	TUR	ISL	BOT
1	Bosnia and Herzegovina (2–1)		2–1	1–2	3–0
2	Turkey (2–1)	1–2		2–1	3–0
3	Iceland (2–1)	2–1	1–2		3–0
4	Botswana (0–3)	0–3	0–3	0–3	

=== Turkey vs. Botswana ===
Turkey
3
Antalya, Turkey
3 April 2002

Botswana
0

			1	2	3
1	(Turkey) (Botswana)	Haluk Akkoyun; Modisaotsile Phatshwane	6; 2	6; 1
2	(Turkey) (Botswana)	Barış Ergün; Petrus Molefe	6; 1	6; 1
3	(Turkey) (Botswana)	Esat Tanık / Ergün Zorlu; Petrus Molefe / Uyapo Nleya	6; 2	6; 0

=== Iceland vs. Bosnia and Herzegovina ===
Iceland
2
Antalya, Turkey
3 April 2002

Bosnia and Herzegovina
1

			1	2	3
1	(Iceland) (Bosnia and Herzegovina)	Davíð Halldórsson; Igor Ibrisbegović	3; 6	1; 6
2	(Iceland) (Bosnia and Herzegovina)	Arnar Sigurðsson; Igor Račić	6; 4	6; 4
3	(Iceland) (Bosnia and Herzegovina)	Davíð Halldórsson / Arnar Sigurðsson; Ismar Gorčić / Igor Ibrisbegović	6; 3	7; 5

=== Turkey vs. Iceland ===
Turkey
2
Antalya, Turkey
4 April 2002

Iceland
1

			1	2	3
1	(Turkey) (Iceland)	Haluk Akkoyun; Davíð Halldórsson	6; 1	6; 0
2	(Turkey) (Iceland)	Barış Ergün; Arnar Sigurðsson	4; 6	5; 7
3	(Turkey) (Iceland)	Haluk Akkoyun / Barış Ergün; Davíð Halldórsson / Arnar Sigurðsson	6; 4	6; 1

=== Bosnia and Herzegovina vs. Botswana ===
Bosnia and Herzegovina
3
Antalya, Turkey
4 April 2002

Botswana
0

			1	2	3
1	(Bosnia and Herzegovina) (Botswana)	Igor Ibrisbegović; Uyapo Nleya	6; 0	6; 2
2	(Bosnia and Herzegovina) (Botswana)	Igor Račić; Petrus Molefe	6; 2	6; 0
3	(Bosnia and Herzegovina) (Botswana)	Ismar Gorčić / Igor Račić; Uyapo Nleya / Modisaotsile Phatshwane	6; 0	6; 0

=== Turkey vs. Bosnia and Herzegovina ===
Turkey
1
Antalya, Turkey
5 April 2002

Bosnia and Herzegovina
2

			1	2	3
1	(Turkey) (Bosnia and Herzegovina)	Haluk Akkoyun; Igor Ibrisbegović	3; 6	3; 6
2	(Turkey) (Bosnia and Herzegovina)	Barış Ergün; Igor Račić	1; 6	7^{7} 6^{2}	1; 6
3	(Turkey) (Bosnia and Herzegovina)	Haluk Akkoyun / Barış Ergün; Ismar Gorčić / Igor Ibrisbegović	6; 4	4; 6	6; 3

=== Iceland vs. Botswana ===
Iceland
3
Antalya, Turkey
5 April 2002

Botswana
0

			1	2	3
1	(Iceland) (Botswana)	Davíð Halldórsson; Modisaotsile Phatshwane	6; 1	3; 6	6; 4
2	(Iceland) (Botswana)	Arnar Sigurðsson; Petrus Molefe	6; 0	6; 2
3	(Iceland) (Botswana)	Davíð Halldórsson / Arnar Sigurðsson; Petrus Molefe / Uyapo Nleya	6; 2	6; 1

== Promotion pool ==
The top two teams from each of Pools A and B advanced to the Promotion pool. Results and points from games against the opponent from the preliminary round were carried forward.

(scores in italics carried over from Groups)

	1st–4th Play-off	MON	AND	TUR	BIH
1	Monaco (3–0)		2–1	3–0	3–0
2	Andorra (1–2)	1–2		1–2	2–1
3	Turkey (1–2)	0–3	2–1		1–2
4	Bosnia and Herzegovina (1–2)	0–3	1–2	2–1	

Monaco and Andorra promoted to Group II in 2003.

=== Turkey vs. Monaco ===
Turkey
0
Antalya, Turkey
6 April 2002

Monaco
3

			1	2	3
1	(Turkey) (Monaco)	Esat Tanık; Christophe Bosio	6; 1	6^{5} 7^{7}	3; 6
2	(Turkey) (Monaco)	Haluk Akkoyun; Guillaume Couillard	2; 6	4; 6
3	(Turkey) (Monaco)	Barış Ergün / Ergün Zorlu; Guillaume Couillard / Emmanuel Heussner	4; 6	6; 4	1; 6

=== Andorra vs. Bosnia and Herzegovina ===
Andorra
2
Antalya, Turkey
6 April 2002

Bosnia and Herzegovina
1

			1	2	3
1	(Andorra) (Bosnia and Herzegovina)	Kenneth Tuilier-Curco; Igor Ibrisbegović	7; 5	6; 0
2	(Andorra) (Bosnia and Herzegovina)	Joan Jiménez Guerra; Igor Račić	6; 1	6; 1
3	(Andorra) (Bosnia and Herzegovina)	Joan Jiménez Guerra / Jean-Baptiste Poux-Gautier; Ivan Dodig / Igor Račić	3; 6	6; 3	3; 6

=== Turkey vs. Andorra ===
Turkey
2
Antalya, Turkey
7 April 2002

Andorra
1

			1	2	3
1	(Turkey) (Andorra)	Esat Tanık; Kenneth Tuilier-Curco	7; 5	6; 1
2	(Turkey) (Andorra)	Barış Ergün; Joan Jiménez Guerra	2; 6	2; 6
3	(Turkey) (Andorra)	Esat Tanık / Ergün Zorlu; Oscar Pons / Kenneth Tuilier-Curco	6; 2	7^{7} 6^{2}

=== Monaco vs. Bosnia and Herzegovina ===
Monaco
3
Antalya, Turkey
7 April 2002

Bosnia and Herzegovina
0

			1	2	3
1	(Monaco) (Bosnia and Herzegovina)	Emmanuel Heussner; Igor Ibrisbegović	6; 0			retired
2	(Monaco) (Bosnia and Herzegovina)	Guillaume Couillard; Igor Račić	6; 0	6; 3
3	(Monaco) (Bosnia and Herzegovina)	Christophe Bosio / Emmanuel Heussner; Ivan Dodig / Igor Račić	6; 1	6; 1

== Relegation pool ==
The bottom two teams from Pools A and B were placed in the relegation group. Results and points from games against the opponent from the preliminary round were carried forward.

(scores in italics carried over from Groups)

	5th–8th Play-off	LTU	NAM	ISL	BOT
1	Lithuania (3–0)		3–0	3–0	3–0
2	Namibia (2–1)	0–3		2–1	3–0
3	Iceland (1–2)	0–3	1–2		3–0
4	Botswana (0–3)	0–3	0–3	0–3	

Iceland and Botswana relegated to Group IV in 2003.

=== Iceland vs. Namibia ===
Iceland
1
Antalya, Turkey
6 April 2002

Namibia
2

			1	2	3
1	(Iceland) (Namibia)	Andri Jonsson; Henrico Du Plessis	1; 6	0; 6
2	(Iceland) (Namibia)	Arnar Sigurðsson; Johan Theron	6; 3	3; 6	7; 5
3	(Iceland) (Namibia)	Davíð Halldórsson / Arnar Sigurðsson; Henrico Du Plessis / Johan Theron	3; 6	6; 4	4; 6

=== Lithuania vs. Botswana ===
Lithuania
3
Antalya, Turkey
6 April 2002

Botswana
0

			1	2	3
1	(Lithuania) (Botswana)	Gvidas Sabeckis; Uyapo Nleya	6; 1	6; 2
2	(Lithuania) (Botswana)	Aivaras Balžekas; Modisaotsile Phatshwane	6; 0	6; 1
3	(Lithuania) (Botswana)	Rolandas Muraška / Gvidas Sabeckis; Uyapo Nleya / Modisaotsile Phatshwane	6; 3	6; 1

=== Iceland vs. Lithuania ===
Iceland
0
Antalya, Turkey
7 April 2002

Lithuania
3

			1	2	3
1	(Iceland) (Lithuania)	Andri Jonsson; Gvidas Sabeckis	2; 6	2; 6
2	(Iceland) (Lithuania)	Arnar Sigurðsson; Aivaras Balžekas	1; 6	6; 3	3; 6
3	(Iceland) (Lithuania)	Davíð Halldórsson / Andri Jonsson; Rolandas Muraška / Gvidas Sabeckis	2; 6	1; 6

=== Namibia vs. Botswana ===
Namibia
3
Antalya, Turkey
7 April 2002

Botswana
0

			1	2	3
1	(Namibia) (Botswana)	Henrico Du Plessis; Uyapo Nleya	6; 0	6; 0
2	(Namibia) (Botswana)	Johan Theron; Modisaotsile Phatshwane	6; 0	6; 0
3	(Namibia) (Botswana)	Nicky Buys / Jean-Pierre Huish; Moses Motate / Modisaotsile Phatshwane	6; 0	6; 2

== Final standings ==
Rank	Team
1	Monaco
2	Andorra
3	Turkey
4	Bosnia and Herzegovina
5	Lithuania
6	Namibia
7	Iceland
8	Botswana

- Monaco and Andorra promoted to Group II in 2003.
- Iceland and Botswana relegated to Group IV in 2003.
