= 2009 Davis Cup Europe/Africa Zone Group II =

International tennis competition

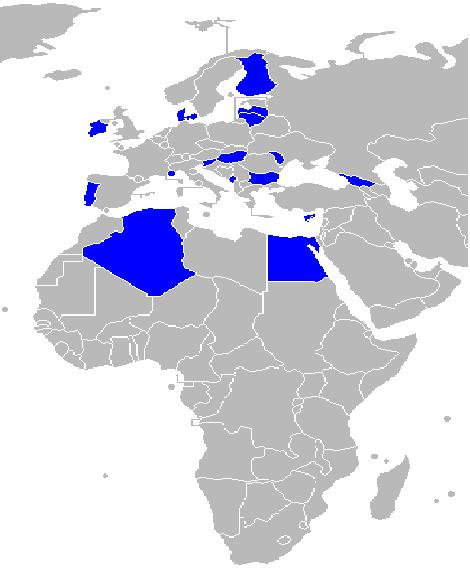
Countries participating in the 2009 Davis Cup Europe/Africa Zone Group II

The European and African Zone is one of the three zones of regional Davis Cup competition in 2009.

In the European and African Zone there are four different groups in which teams compete against each other to advance to the next group.

== Participating teams ==
- Algeria
- Bulgaria
- Cyprus
- Denmark
- Egypt
- Finland
- Georgia
- Hungary
- Ireland
- Latvia
- Lithuania
- Moldova
- Monaco
- Montenegro
- Portugal
- Slovenia

== Draw ==
Relegation Play-offs
Cairo, Egypt
Georgia	0
Egypt	5
Gödöllő, Hungary
Moldova	2
Hungary	3
Lyngby, Denmark
Denmark	3
Montenegro	2
Oran, Algeria
Algeria	0
Portugal	5

First Round
Vilnius, Lithuania
Georgia	2
Lithuania	3
Otočec, Slovenia
Slovenia	5
Egypt	0
Jūrmala, Latvia
Latvia	5
Moldova	0
Győr, Hungary
Hungary	2
Bulgaria	3
Kolding, Denmark
Denmark	2
Finland	3
Roquebrune-Cap-Martin, Monaco
Montenegro	0
Monaco	5
Algiers, Algeria
Ireland	4
Algeria	1
Nicosia, Cyprus
Cyprus	3
Portugal	2

Second Round
Otočec, Slovenia
Lithuania	0
Slovenia	5
Plovdiv, Bulgaria
Latvia	4
Bulgaria	1
Naantali, Finland
Finland	3
Monaco	2
Nicosia, Cyprus
Ireland	2
Cyprus	3

Third Round
Jūrmala, Latvia
Slovenia	2
Latvia	3
Salo, Finland
Finland	3
Cyprus	2

- Georgia, Moldova, Montenegro, and Algeria relegated to Group III in 2010.
- Latvia and Finland promoted to Group I in 2010

== First round matches ==
=== Georgia vs. Lithuania ===
Georgia
2
SEB Arena, Vilnius, Lithuania
6–8 March 2009
Hard (indoor)

Lithuania
3

			1	2	3	4	5
1	(Georgia (country)) (Lithuania)	George Khrikadze; Ričardas Berankis	1; 6	3; 6	1; 6
2	(Georgia (country)) (Lithuania)	Lado Chikhladze; Gvidas Sabeckis	6; 4	6; 1	6; 2
3	(Georgia (country)) (Lithuania)	Lado Chikhladze / Irakli Labadze; Daniel Lencina-Ribes / Gvidas Sabeckis	7^{7} 6^{3}	6; 1	6; 2
4	(Georgia (country)) (Lithuania)	Lado Chikhladze; Ričardas Berankis	3; 6	4; 6	1; 6
5	(Georgia (country)) (Lithuania)	Irakli Labadze; Dovydas Šakinis	1; 6	2; 6	4; 6

=== Slovenia vs. Egypt ===
Slovenia
5
Tk Krka Otocec, Otočec, Slovenia
6–8 March 2009
Carpet (indoor)

Egypt
0

			1	2	3	4	5
1	(Slovenia) (Egypt)	Grega Žemlja; Sherif Sabry	7; 5	7^{8} 6^{6}	6; 2
2	(Slovenia) (Egypt)	Blaž Kavčič; Karim Maamoun	6; 0	6; 2	6; 2
3	(Slovenia) (Egypt)	Andrej Kračman / Grega Žemlja; Karim Maamoun / Sherif Sabry	6; 2	6; 3	6; 3
4	(Slovenia) (Egypt)	Andrej Kračman; Mohamed Safwat	7^{7} 6^{4}	6; 3
5	(Slovenia) (Egypt)	Blaž Kavčič; Mahmoud Ezz	3; 6	7^{7} 6^{5}	6; 4

=== Latvia vs. Moldova ===
Latvia
5
Tennis Centre Lielupe, Jūrmala, Latvia
6–8 March 2009
Carpet (indoor)

Moldova
0

			1	2	3	4	5
1	(Latvia) (Moldova)	Andis Juška; Andrei Gorban	6; 4	7^{7} 6^{4}	6; 1
2	(Latvia) (Moldova)	Deniss Pavlovs; Andrei Ciumac	7^{10} 6^{8}	6; 1	6; 4
3	(Latvia) (Moldova)	Andis Juška / Deniss Pavlovs; Radu Albot / Andrei Ciumac	6; 2	6; 2	6; 2
4	(Latvia) (Moldova)	Kārlis Lejnieks; Radu Albot	7^{8} 6^{6}	6; 3
5	(Latvia) (Moldova)	Adrians Žguns; Maxim Dubarenco	6; 2	3; 6	6; 2

=== Hungary vs. Bulgaria ===
Hungary
2
Egyetemi Sportcsarnok, Győr, Hungary
6–8 March 2009
Carpet (indoor)

Bulgaria
3

			1	2	3	4	5
1	(Hungary) (Bulgaria)	Attila Balázs; Todor Enev	2; 6	6; 4	4; 6	4; 6
2	(Hungary) (Bulgaria)	Ádám Kellner; Grigor Dimitrov	6^{5} 7^{7}	4; 6	7^{7} 6^{5}	6^{5} 7^{7}
3	(Hungary) (Bulgaria)	Kornél Bardóczky / Robert Varga; Grigor Dimitrov / Todor Enev	1; 6	6; 2	3; 6	6; 2	6; 2
4	(Hungary) (Bulgaria)	Attila Balázs; Grigor Dimitrov	6^{2} 7^{7}	6; 3	3; 6	6; 3	0; 6
5	(Hungary) (Bulgaria)	Ádám Kellner; Tihomir Grozdanov	4; 6	6; 2	7^{7} 6^{3}

=== Denmark vs. Finland ===
Denmark
2
Bramdrupdam Hallerne, Kolding, Denmark
6–8 March 2009
Carpet (indoor)

Finland
3

			1	2	3	4	5
1	(Denmark) (Finland)	Martin Pedersen; Jarkko Nieminen	3; 6	1; 6	3; 6
2	(Denmark) (Finland)	Frederik Nielsen; Timo Nieminen	2; 6	6; 4	6; 2	6; 3
3	(Denmark) (Finland)	Frederik Nielsen / Rasmus Nørby; Henri Kontinen / Jarkko Nieminen	4; 6	4; 6	5; 7
4	(Denmark) (Finland)	Frederik Nielsen; Jarkko Nieminen	1; 6	3; 6	6; 3	7; 5	1; 6
5	(Denmark) (Finland)	Martin Pedersen; Henri Kontinen	6; 4	6; 4

=== Montenegro vs. Monaco ===
Montenegro
0
Monte Carlo Country Club, Roquebrune Cap Martin, Monaco
6–8 March 2009
Clay

Monaco
5

			1	2	3	4	5
1	(Montenegro) (Monaco)	Goran Tošić; Jean-René Lisnard	5; 7	5; 7	6; 4	3; 6
2	(Montenegro) (Monaco)	Daniel Danilović; Benjamin Balleret	3; 6	3; 6	3; 6
3	(Montenegro) (Monaco)	Daniel Danilović / Goran Tošić; Guillaume Couillard / Jean-René Lisnard	1; 6	7^{7} 6^{4}	3; 6	6^{5} 7^{7}
4	(Montenegro) (Monaco)	Nemanja Kontic; Guillaume Couillard	2; 6	1; 6
5	(Montenegro) (Monaco)	Goran Tošić; Benjamin Balleret	5; 7	4; 6

=== Ireland vs. Algeria ===
Ireland
4
Office du Complexe Olympique Mohamed Boudiaf, Algiers, Algeria
6–8 March 2009
Clay

Algeria
1

			1	2	3	4	5
1	(Republic of Ireland) (Algeria)	Kevin Brown; Eddy Chala	6^{4} 7^{7}	7; 5	4; 6	4; 6
2	(Republic of Ireland) (Algeria)	Conor Niland; Slimane Saoudi	6; 3	6; 1	6; 2
3	(Republic of Ireland) (Algeria)	James McGee / Colin O'Brien; Abdelhak Hameurlaine / Slimane Saoudi	7; 5	3; 6	6^{4} 7^{7}	6; 2	6; 4
4	(Republic of Ireland) (Algeria)	Conor Niland; Eddy Chala	7^{13} 6^{11}	6; 2	6; 1
5	(Republic of Ireland) (Algeria)	Colin O'Brien; Ouassel Hared	6; 4	6; 4

=== Cyprus vs. Portugal ===
Cyprus
3
National Tennis Centre, Nicosia, Cyprus
6–8 March 2009
Hard

Portugal
2

			1	2	3	4	5
1	(Cyprus) (Portugal)	Photos Kallias; Frederico Gil	0; 6	2; 6	1; 6
2	(Cyprus) (Portugal)	Marcos Baghdatis; Rui Machado	6; 3	7; 5	6; 4
3	(Cyprus) (Portugal)	Marcos Baghdatis / Photos Kallias; Frederico Gil / Leonardo Tavares	6; 4	3; 6	4; 6	6; 3	6; 1
4	(Cyprus) (Portugal)	Marcos Baghdatis; Frederico Gil	6; 2	7; 5	6; 2
5	(Cyprus) (Portugal)	Philippos Tsangaridis; João Sousa	3; 6	1; 6

== Play-offs ==
=== Georgia vs. Egypt ===
Georgia
0
El Gezera Sporting Club, Cairo, Egypt
10–12 July 2009
Clay

Egypt
5

			1	2	3	4	5
1	(Georgia (country)) (Egypt)	George Khrikadze; Karim Maamoun	0; 6	0; 5				retired
2	(Georgia (country)) (Egypt)	Nodar Itonishvili; Sherif Sabry	2; 6	4; 6	0; 6
3	(Georgia (country)) (Egypt)	Nodar Itonishvili / George Khrikadze; Karim Maamoun / Sherif Sabry	0; 6	2; 6	1; 6
4	(Georgia (country)) (Egypt)	Nodar Itonishvili; Mohamed Mamoun	1; 6	3; 6
5	(Georgia (country)) (Egypt)	Alexander Tavkhelidze; Omar Hedayet	6; 1	2; 6	2; 6

=== Moldova vs. Hungary ===
Moldova
2
Gödöllő Kiskastély, Gödöllő, Hungary
10–12 July 2009
Clay

Hungary
3

			1	2	3	4	5
1	(Moldova) (Hungary)	Radu Albot; Attila Balázs	1; 6	4; 6	6; 4	4; 6
2	(Moldova) (Hungary)	Andrei Gorban; Dénes Lukács	6; 4	2; 6	7; 5	6; 1
3	(Moldova) (Hungary)	Andrei Ciumac / Radu Albot; Róbert Varga / Attila Balázs	3; 6	6; 4	6; 4	5; 7	4; 6
4	(Moldova) (Hungary)	Andrei Gorban; Attila Balázs	4; 6	0; 6	4; 6
5	(Moldova) (Hungary)	Radu Albot; Dénes Lukács	6; 3	6; 2

=== Denmark vs. Montenegro ===
Denmark
3
Lyngby Tennisklub, Lyngby, Denmark
10–12 July 2009
Clay

Montenegro
2

			1	2	3	4	5
1	(Denmark) (Montenegro)	Frederik Nielsen; Goran Tošić	7; 5	4; 6	6^{5} 7^{7}	4; 6
2	(Denmark) (Montenegro)	Martin Pedersen; Daniel Danilović	7^{7} 6^{5}	6; 4	6; 1
3	(Denmark) (Montenegro)	Frederik Nielsen / Martin Pedersen; Daniel Danilović / Goran Tošić	2; 6	3; 6	3; 6
4	(Denmark) (Montenegro)	Frederik Nielsen; Daniel Danilović	3; 6	6; 1	6; 2	6; 4
5	(Denmark) (Montenegro)	Martin Pedersen; Goran Tošić	6; 4	6; 3	6; 2

=== Algeria vs. Portugal ===
Algeria
0
Office des parc Omnisport Wilaya d'Oran, Oran, Algeria
10–12 July 2009
Clay

Portugal
5

			1	2	3	4	5
1	(Algeria) (Portugal)	Valentin Rahmine; Rui Machado	0; 6	0; 6	0; 6
2	(Algeria) (Portugal)	Abdel-Hak Hameurlaine; Frederico Gil	1; 6	2; 6	4; 6
3	(Algeria) (Portugal)	Abdel-Hak Hameurlaine / Valentin Rahmine; Frederico Gil / Leonardo Tavares	1; 6	2; 6	3; 6
4	(Algeria) (Portugal)	Valentin Rahmine; Leonardo Tavares	1; 6	0; 6
5	(Algeria) (Portugal)	Sid-Ali Akkal; João Sousa	3; 6	0; 6

== Second round matches ==
=== Lithuania vs. Slovenia ===
Lithuania
0
TK Krka Otočec, Otočec, Slovenia
10–12 July 2009
Clay

Slovenia
5

			1	2	3	4	5
1	(Lithuania) (Slovenia)	Ričardas Berankis; Grega Žemlja	1; 6	4; 6	3; 6
2	(Lithuania) (Slovenia)	Gvidas Sabeckis; Blaž Kavčič	2; 6	3; 6	1; 6
3	(Lithuania) (Slovenia)	Ričardas Berankis / Vadim Pinko; Grega Žemlja / Andrej Kračman	6^{3} 7^{7}	3; 6	3; 6
4	(Lithuania) (Slovenia)	Ričardas Berankis; Janez Semrajc	3; 6	5; 7
5	(Lithuania) (Slovenia)	Dovydas Šakinis; Grega Žemlja	4; 6	6; 2	1; 6

=== Latvia vs. Bulgaria ===
Latvia
4
TC Lokomotiv, Plovdiv, Bulgaria
10–12 July 2009
Clay

Bulgaria
1

			1	2	3	4	5
1	(Latvia) (Bulgaria)	Andis Juška; Tihomir Grozdanov	6^{5} 7^{7}	6; 2	6; 3	6; 4
2	(Latvia) (Bulgaria)	Ernests Gulbis; Todor Enev	7; 5	6; 2	6; 2
3	(Latvia) (Bulgaria)	Ernests Gulbis / Deniss Pavlovs; Todor Enev / Ivaylo Traykov	6; 4	6; 4	6; 4
4	(Latvia) (Bulgaria)	Adrians Žguns; Tihomir Grozdanov	4; 6	3; 6
5	(Latvia) (Bulgaria)	Andis Juška; Valentin Dimov	6; 4	6; 4

=== Finland vs. Monaco ===
Finland
3
Kirkkopuiston tenniskentat, Naantali, Finland
10–12 July 2009
Clay

Monaco
2

			1	2	3	4	5
1	(Finland) (Monaco)	Timo Nieminen; Benjamin Balleret	6; 1	6; 4	1; 6	4; 6	4; 6
2	(Finland) (Monaco)	Henri Kontinen; Guillaume Couillard	4; 6	4; 6	7^{7} 6^{4}	7^{7} 6^{5}	6; 2
3	(Finland) (Monaco)	Harri Heliövaara / Henri Kontinen; Guillaume Couillard / Benjamin Balleret	3; 6	6^{7} 7^{9}	3; 6
4	(Finland) (Monaco)	Henri Laaksonen; Clément Morel	7; 5	6; 2	6^{4} 7^{7}	2; 6	6; 3
5	(Finland) (Monaco)	Henri Kontinen; Benjamin Balleret	6; 3	6; 4	6; 1

=== Ireland vs. Cyprus ===
Ireland
2
National Tennis Center, Nicosia, Cyprus
10–12 July 2009
Hard

Cyprus
3

			1	2	3	4	5
1	(Republic of Ireland) (Cyprus)	Louk Sorensen; Marcos Baghdatis	7^{7} 6^{5}	4; 6	6; 3	5; 7	4; 6
2	(Republic of Ireland) (Cyprus)	Conor Niland; Photos Kallias	5; 7	6; 3	5; 0			retired
3	(Republic of Ireland) (Cyprus)	James McGee / Colin O'Brien; Marcos Baghdatis / Photos Kallias	2; 6	7; 5	2; 6	2; 6
4	(Republic of Ireland) (Cyprus)	Conor Niland; Marcos Baghdatis	6; 4	3; 6	1; 6	3; 6
5	(Republic of Ireland) (Cyprus)	Colin O'Brien; Demetrios Leontis	7^{7} 6^{2}	6; 3

== Third round matches ==
=== Slovenia vs. Latvia ===
Slovenia
2
Tennis Centre Lielupe, Jūrmala, Latvia
18–20 September 2009
Carpet (indoor)

Latvia
3

			1	2	3	4	5
1	(Slovenia) (Latvia)	Grega Žemlja; Andis Juška	6; 1	6; 1	6; 4
2	(Slovenia) (Latvia)	Luka Gregorc; Ernests Gulbis	6; 4	7^{7} 6^{3}	4; 6	4; 6	6; 8
3	(Slovenia) (Latvia)	Luka Gregorc / Grega Žemlja; Ernests Gulbis / Deniss Pavlovs	6^{5} 7^{7}	6; 4	6; 2	2; 6	6; 4
4	(Slovenia) (Latvia)	Grega Žemlja; Ernests Gulbis	2; 6	6; 3	3; 6	5; 7
5	(Slovenia) (Latvia)	Blaž Kavčič; Andis Juška	3; 6	4; 6	2; 6

=== Finland vs. Cyprus ===
Finland
3
Salohalli, Salo, Finland
18–20 September 2009
Hard (indoor)

Cyprus
2

			1	2	3	4	5
1	(Finland) (Cyprus)	Jarkko Nieminen; Photos Kallias	6; 2	6; 1	6; 0
2	(Finland) (Cyprus)	Henri Kontinen; Marcos Baghdatis	3; 6	3; 6	2; 6
3	(Finland) (Cyprus)	Henri Kontinen / Jarkko Nieminen; Marcos Baghdatis / Photos Kallias	6^{5} 7^{7}	1; 6	6; 2	6; 3	7; 5
4	(Finland) (Cyprus)	Jarkko Nieminen; Marcos Baghdatis	5; 7	3; 6	6; 3	4; 6
5	(Finland) (Cyprus)	Henri Kontinen; Photos Kallias	6; 0	7; 5	6; 0
