= 2010 Davis Cup Europe/Africa Zone Group II =

International tennis competition

The European and African Zone was one of the three zones of regional Davis Cup competition in 2010.

In the European and African Zone there are four different groups in which teams compete against each other to advance to the next group.

== Participating teams ==
=== Seeds ===
1. Great Britain
2. Macedonia
3. Monaco
4. Cyprus
5. Portugal
6. Slovenia
7. Ireland
8. Hungary

=== Remaining Nations ===
- Bosnia and Herzegovina
- Bulgaria
- Denmark
- Egypt
- Estonia
- Lithuania
- Norway
- Turkey

== Draw ==
Play-offs
Eastbourne, Great Britain (grass)
1	Great Britain	5
Turkey	0
Monte Carlo, Monaco (clay)
3	Monaco	5
Norway	0
Cairo, Egypt (clay)
Denmark	5
Egypt	0
Gödöllő, Hungary (clay)
8	Hungary	4
2	Macedonia	1

First Round
Vilnius, Lithuania (indoor hard)
1	Great Britain	2
Lithuania	3
Dublin, Ireland (indoor carpet)
7	Ireland	4
Turkey	1
Sofia, Bulgaria (indoor hard)
3	Monaco	2
Bulgaria	3
Oslo, Norway (indoor hard)
6	Slovenia	5
Norway	0
Maia, Portugal (indoor clay)
Denmark	1
5	Portugal	4
Limassol, Cyprus (indoor hard)
Egypt	2
4	Cyprus	3
Tallinn, Estonia (indoor hard)
Estonia	4
8	Hungary	1
Veles, Macedonia (indoor clay)
Bosnia and Herzegovina	3
2	Macedonia	2

Second Round
Dublin, Ireland (indoor carpet)
Lithuania	3
7	Ireland	2
Otočec, Slovenia (clay)
Bulgaria	0
6	Slovenia	5
Cruz Quebrada, Portugal (clay)
5	Portugal	5
4	Cyprus	0
Tallinn, Estonia (clay)
Estonia	2
Bosnia and Herzegovina	3

Third Round
Vilnius, Lithuania (indoor hard)
Lithuania	2
6	Slovenia	3
Cruz Quebrada, Portugal (clay)
5	Portugal	3
Bosnia and Herzegovina	2

- Turkey, Norway, Egypt, and Macedonia relegated to Group III in 2011.
- Slovenia and Portugal promoted to Group I in 2011.

== First Round Matches ==
=== Great Britain vs. Lithuania ===
Great Britain
2
SEB Arena, Vilnius, Lithuania
5–7 March 2010
Hard (indoor)

Lithuania
3

			1	2	3	4	5
1	(United Kingdom) (Lithuania)	James Ward; Laurynas Grigelis	6; 4	6; 2	6; 4
2	(United Kingdom) (Lithuania)	Daniel Evans; Ričardas Berankis	1; 6	6; 4	6^{5} 7^{7}	6; 3	3; 6
3	(United Kingdom) (Lithuania)	Colin Fleming / Ken Skupski; Laurynas Grigelis / Dovydas Šakinis	6; 0	6^{2} 7^{7}	7; 5	6; 3
4	(United Kingdom) (Lithuania)	James Ward; Ričardas Berankis	6^{4} 7^{7}	3; 6	4; 6
5	(United Kingdom) (Lithuania)	Daniel Evans; Laurynas Grigelis	7^{8} 6^{6}	5; 7	0; 6	6; 2	4; 6

=== Ireland vs. Turkey ===
Ireland
4
Fitzwilliam Lawn Tennis Club, Dublin, Ireland
5–7 March 2010
Carpet (indoor)

Turkey
1

			1	2	3	4	5
1	(Republic of Ireland) (Turkey)	James McGee; Haluk Akkoyun	6; 2	6; 2	6; 4
2	(Republic of Ireland) (Turkey)	Conor Niland; Marsel İlhan	6; 3	6; 2	6; 1
3	(Republic of Ireland) (Turkey)	Barry King / James McGee; Haluk Akkoyun / Marsel İlhan	6; 3	6; 1	6; 3
4	(Republic of Ireland) (Turkey)	James McGee; Marsel İlhan	2; 6	4; 6
5	(Republic of Ireland) (Turkey)	Barry King; Baris Erguden	7; 5	3; 6	6; 2

=== Monaco vs. Bulgaria ===
Monaco
2
Tennis Hall Sofia, Sofia, Bulgaria
5–7 March 2010
Hard (indoor)

Bulgaria
3

			1	2	3	4	5
1	(Monaco) (Bulgaria)	Benjamin Balleret; Todor Enev	4; 6	6^{0} 7^{7}	7; 5	6; 2	6; 1
2	(Monaco) (Bulgaria)	Thomas Oger; Grigor Dimitrov	4; 6	5; 7	3; 6
3	(Monaco) (Bulgaria)	Benjamin Balleret / Guillaume Couillard; Grigor Dimitrov / Todor Enev	5; 7	3; 6	4; 6
4	(Monaco) (Bulgaria)	Benjamin Balleret; Grigor Dimitrov	3; 6	3; 6	1; 6
5	(Monaco) (Bulgaria)	Thomas Oger; Tzvetan Mihov	6; 1	6; 4

=== Slovenia vs. Norway ===
Slovenia
5
Riksanlegget For Tennis, Oslo, Norway
5–7 March 2010
Hard (indoor)

Norway
0

			1	2	3	4	5
1	(Slovenia) (Norway)	Blaž Kavčič; Stian Boretti	6; 2	6; 4	6; 2
2	(Slovenia) (Norway)	Grega Žemlja; Erling Tveit	6; 2	6; 2	7^{7} 6^{2}
3	(Slovenia) (Norway)	Luka Gregorc / Grega Žemlja; Stian Boretti / Erling Tveit	7^{7} 6^{2}	7^{7} 6^{5}	7; 5
4	(Slovenia) (Norway)	Luka Gregorc; Fredrik Ask	6; 1	6; 3
5	(Slovenia) (Norway)	Aljaž Bedene; Stian Boretti	6; 3	6; 2

=== Denmark vs. Portugal ===
Denmark
1
Complexo de Tenis da Maia, Maia, Portugal
5–7 March 2010
Clay (indoor)

Portugal
4

			1	2	3	4	5
1	(Denmark) (Portugal)	Frederik Nielsen; Rui Machado	6; 4	4; 6	0; 6	1; 6
2	(Denmark) (Portugal)	Martin Pedersen; Frederico Gil	2; 6	6^{0} 7^{7}	6; 3	3; 6
3	(Denmark) (Portugal)	Frederik Nielsen / Martin Pedersen; Frederico Gil / Leonardo Tavares	4; 6	3; 6	1; 6
4	(Denmark) (Portugal)	Frederik Nielsen; Pedro Sousa	7^{7} 6^{3}	1; 6	1; 6
5	(Denmark) (Portugal)	Martin Pedersen; Leonardo Tavares	7; 5	6; 4

=== Egypt vs. Cyprus ===
Egypt
2
Spyros Kyprianou Athletic Centre, Limassol, Cyprus
5–7 March 2010
Hard (indoor)

Cyprus
3

			1	2	3	4	5
1	(Egypt) (Cyprus)	Karim Maamoun; Rareș Cuzdriorean	6; 3	6; 4	7; 5
2	(Egypt) (Cyprus)	Sherif Sabry; Marcos Baghdatis	2; 6	1; 6	1; 6
3	(Egypt) (Cyprus)	Karim Maamoun / Sherif Sabry; Marcos Baghdatis / Photos Kallias	6^{7} 7^{9}	5; 7	1; 6
4	(Egypt) (Cyprus)	Mohamed Safwat; Marcos Baghdatis	1; 6	2; 6	3; 6
5	(Egypt) (Cyprus)	Sherif Sabry; Christopher Koutrouzas	6; 1	6; 0

=== Estonia vs. Hungary ===
Estonia
4
Coral Tennis Club, Tallinn, Estonia
5–7 March 2010
Hard (indoor)

Hungary
1

			1	2	3	4	5
1	(Estonia) (Hungary)	Jaak Pöldma; Ádám Kellner	3; 6	4; 6	4; 6
2	(Estonia) (Hungary)	Jürgen Zopp; Kornél Bardóczky	7^{9} 6^{7}	6; 1	6; 0
3	(Estonia) (Hungary)	Mait Künnap / Jürgen Zopp; Kornél Bardóczky / Márton Fucsovics	6; 3	2; 6	7; 5	5; 7	10; 8
4	(Estonia) (Hungary)	Jürgen Zopp; Ádám Kellner	6; 3	7^{7} 6^{4}	6; 4
5	(Estonia) (Hungary)	Vladimir Ivanov; Márton Fucsovics	6; 4	7^{7} 6^{5}

=== Bosnia and Herzegovina vs. Macedonia ===
Bosnia and Herzegovina
3
Sport Hall "Gemidzii", Veles, Macedonia
5–7 March 2010
Clay (indoor)

Macedonia
2

			1	2	3	4	5
1	(Bosnia and Herzegovina) (North Macedonia)	Ismar Gorčić; Predrag Rusevski	4; 6	2; 6	4; 6
2	(Bosnia and Herzegovina) (North Macedonia)	Aldin Šetkić; Dimitar Grabuloski	6; 1	6; 4	6; 0
3	(Bosnia and Herzegovina) (North Macedonia)	Ismar Gorčić / Aldin Šetkić; Lazar Magdinčev / Predrag Rusevski	4; 6	4; 6	2; 6
4	(Bosnia and Herzegovina) (North Macedonia)	Aldin Šetkić; Predrag Rusevski	1; 6	7; 5	6; 4	6; 2
5	(Bosnia and Herzegovina) (North Macedonia)	Ismar Gorčić; Lazar Magdinčev	7^{7} 6^{5}	6; 1	6; 3

== Second Round Matches ==
=== Ireland vs. Lithuania ===
Ireland
2
Fitzwilliam Lawn Tennis Club, Dublin, Ireland
9–11 July
Carpet (indoor)

Lithuania
3

			1	2	3	4	5
1	(Republic of Ireland) (Lithuania)	James McGee; Ričardas Berankis	7^{7} 6^{2}	4; 6	4; 6	3; 6
2	(Republic of Ireland) (Lithuania)	Conor Niland; Laurynas Grigelis	2; 6	3; 6	1; 6
3	(Republic of Ireland) (Lithuania)	James Cluskey / Barry King; Ričardas Berankis / Laurynas Grigelis	3; 6	3; 6	4; 6
4	(Republic of Ireland) (Lithuania)	Conor Niland; Lukas Mugevičius	6; 0	6; 2
5	(Republic of Ireland) (Lithuania)	James McGee; Dovydas Šakinis	6; 2	6; 3

=== Slovenia vs. Bulgaria ===
Slovenia
5
TK Krka Otočec, Otočec, Slovenia
9–11 July
Clay

Bulgaria
0

			1	2	3	4	5
1	(Slovenia) (Bulgaria)	Grega Žemlja; Todor Enev	6; 3	6; 1	2; 6	6; 4
2	(Slovenia) (Bulgaria)	Blaž Kavčič; Grigor Dimitrov	1; 6	6; 1	6; 0	6; 3
3	(Slovenia) (Bulgaria)	Luka Gregorc / Grega Žemlja; Grigor Dimitrov / Ivaylo Traykov	6^{3} 7^{7}	7^{7} 6^{2}	7^{14} 6^{12}	6; 3
4	(Slovenia) (Bulgaria)	Blaž Rola; Valentin Dimov	6; 0	6; 1
5	(Slovenia) (Bulgaria)	Blaž Kavčič; Todor Enev	6; 2	6; 1

=== Portugal vs. Cyprus ===
Portugal
5
Centro de Tenis do Jamor, Cruz Quebrada, Portugal
9–11 July
Clay

Cyprus
0

			1	2	3	4	5
1	(Portugal) (Cyprus)	Rui Machado; Rareș Cuzdriorean	6; 3	6; 0	6; 3
2	(Portugal) (Cyprus)	Frederico Gil; Philippos Tsangaridis	6; 0	6; 1				retired
3	(Portugal) (Cyprus)	Frederico Gil / Leonardo Tavares; Eleftherios Christou / Rareș Cuzdriorean	6; 2	6; 1	6; 3
4	(Portugal) (Cyprus)	João Sousa; Eleftherios Christou	6; 1	6; 0
5	(Portugal) (Cyprus)	Rui Machado; Sergis Kyratzis	6; 2	6; 0

=== Estonia vs. Bosnia and Herzegovina ===
Estonia
2
Tere Tennisekeskus, Tallinn, Estonia
9–11 July
Clay

Bosnia and Herzegovina
3

			1	2	3	4	5
1	(Estonia) (Bosnia and Herzegovina)	Jürgen Zopp; Ismar Gorčić	6; 4	6; 1	6; 2
2	(Estonia) (Bosnia and Herzegovina)	Vladimir Ivanov; Aldin Šetkić	4; 6	2; 6	3; 6
3	(Estonia) (Bosnia and Herzegovina)	Mait Künnap / Jürgen Zopp; Ismar Gorčić / Aldin Šetkić	6; 2	6; 1	6; 1
4	(Estonia) (Bosnia and Herzegovina)	Jürgen Zopp; Aldin Šetkić	4; 6	4; 6	3; 6
5	(Estonia) (Bosnia and Herzegovina)	Vladimir Ivanov; Damir Džumhur	6; 2	0; 6	2; 6	3; 6

== Play-offs Matches ==
=== Great Britain vs. Turkey ===
Great Britain
5
Devonshire Park, Eastbourne, England
9–11 July
Grass

Turkey
0

			1	2	3	4	5
1	(United Kingdom) (Turkey)	Jamie Baker; Ergun Zorlu	6; 1	6; 4	6; 1
2	(United Kingdom) (Turkey)	James Ward; Marsel İlhan	6; 2	7; 5	6^{0} 7^{7}	6; 1
3	(United Kingdom) (Turkey)	Colin Fleming / Ken Skupski; Haluk Akkoyun / Ergun Zorlu	6; 3	6; 4	6; 4
4	(United Kingdom) (Turkey)	Jamie Baker; Tuna Altuna	6; 3	6; 2
5	(United Kingdom) (Turkey)	James Ward; Ergun Zorlu	6; 1	6; 3

=== Monaco vs. Norway ===
Monaco
5
Monte Carlo Country Club, Roquebrune Cap Martin, Monaco
9–11 July
Clay

Norway
0

			1	2	3	4	5
1	(Monaco) (Norway)	Benjamin Balleret; Stian Boretti	6; 0	6; 3	2; 1			retired
2	(Monaco) (Norway)	Thomas Oger; Erling Tveit	6; 1	6; 2	7^{7} 6^{5}
3	(Monaco) (Norway)	Guillaume Couillard / Thomas Oger; Stian Boretti / Erling Tveit	1; 6	6; 1	6; 0	6; 4
4	(Monaco) (Norway)	Benjamin Balleret; Fredrik Ask	6; 2	6^{6} 7^{8}	6; 0
5	(Monaco) (Norway)	Thomas Oger; Adrian Forberg Skogeng	6; 1	6; 2

=== Egypt vs. Denmark ===
Egypt
0
El Gezera Sporting Club, Cairo, Egypt
9–11 July
Clay

Denmark
5

			1	2	3	4	5
1	(Egypt) (Denmark)	Sherif Sabry; Frederik Nielsen	6; 2	4; 6	4; 6	6; 1	4; 6
2	(Egypt) (Denmark)	Karim Maamoun; Martin Pedersen	6^{4} 7^{7}	7^{8} 6^{6}	6^{3} 7^{7}	1; 6
3	(Egypt) (Denmark)	Karim Maamoun / Sherif Sabry; Thomas Kromann / Frederik Nielsen	3; 6	4; 6	6^{5} 7^{7}
4	(Egypt) (Denmark)	Karim Maamoun; Thomas Kromann	4; 6	3; 6
5	(Egypt) (Denmark)	Sherif Sabry; Soren Wedege	5; 7	5; 7

=== Hungary vs. Macedonia ===
Hungary
4
Gödöllő Kiskastely, Gödöllő, Hungary
9–11 July
Clay

Macedonia
1

			1	2	3	4	5
1	(Hungary) (North Macedonia)	Attila Balázs; Predrag Rusevski	6; 4	6; 2	6; 4
2	(Hungary) (North Macedonia)	Adam Kellner; Dimitar Grabuloski	6; 1	7; 5	4; 6	4; 6	2; 6
3	(Hungary) (North Macedonia)	Gyorgy Balázs / Kornél Bardóczky; Lazar Magdinčev / Tomislav Jotovski	3; 6	6; 2	2; 6	6; 0	6; 3
4	(Hungary) (North Macedonia)	Attila Balázs; Dimitar Grabuloski	6; 3	6; 1	6; 2
5	(Hungary) (North Macedonia)	Gyorgy Balázs; Tomislav Jotovski	6; 0	6; 1

== Third round Matches ==
=== Lithuania vs. Slovenia ===
Lithuania
2
SEB Arena, Vilnius, Lithuania
17–19 September
Hard (indoor)

Slovenia
3

			1	2	3	4	5
1	(Lithuania) (Slovenia)	Ričardas Berankis; Blaž Kavčič	3; 6	6; 2	7^{11} 6^{9}	6; 4
2	(Lithuania) (Slovenia)	Laurynas Grigelis; Grega Žemlja	3; 6	6^{4} 7^{7}	3; 6
3	(Lithuania) (Slovenia)	Ričardas Berankis / Laurynas Grigelis; Luka Gregorc / Grega Žemlja	5; 7	4; 6	6; 1	6; 3	6; 3
4	(Lithuania) (Slovenia)	Ričardas Berankis; Grega Žemlja	6^{2} 7^{7}	4; 6	3; 6
5	(Lithuania) (Slovenia)	Laurynas Grigelis; Blaž Kavčič	4; 6	6^{4} 7^{7}	6^{5} 7^{7}

=== Portugal vs. Bosnia and Herzegovina ===
Portugal
3
Centro de Tenis Do Jamor, Cruz Quebrada, Portugal
17–19 September
Clay

Bosnia and Herzegovina
2

			1	2	3	4	5
1	(Portugal) (Bosnia and Herzegovina)	Frederico Gil; Amer Delić	6; 3	6; 4	6^{14} 7^{16}	3; 6	9; 7
2	(Portugal) (Bosnia and Herzegovina)	Rui Machado; Aldin Šetkić	4; 6	3; 6	6; 1	1; 6
3	(Portugal) (Bosnia and Herzegovina)	Frederico Gil / Leonardo Tavares; Amer Delić / Aldin Šetkić	6; 1	6; 4	4; 6	6; 4
4	(Portugal) (Bosnia and Herzegovina)	Frederico Gil; Aldin Šetkić	6; 4	6; 3	6; 3
5	(Portugal) (Bosnia and Herzegovina)	João Sousa; Damir Džumhur	6; 4	4; 6	1; 6
