= Lukas Mugevičius =

Lithuanian tennis player (born 1994)

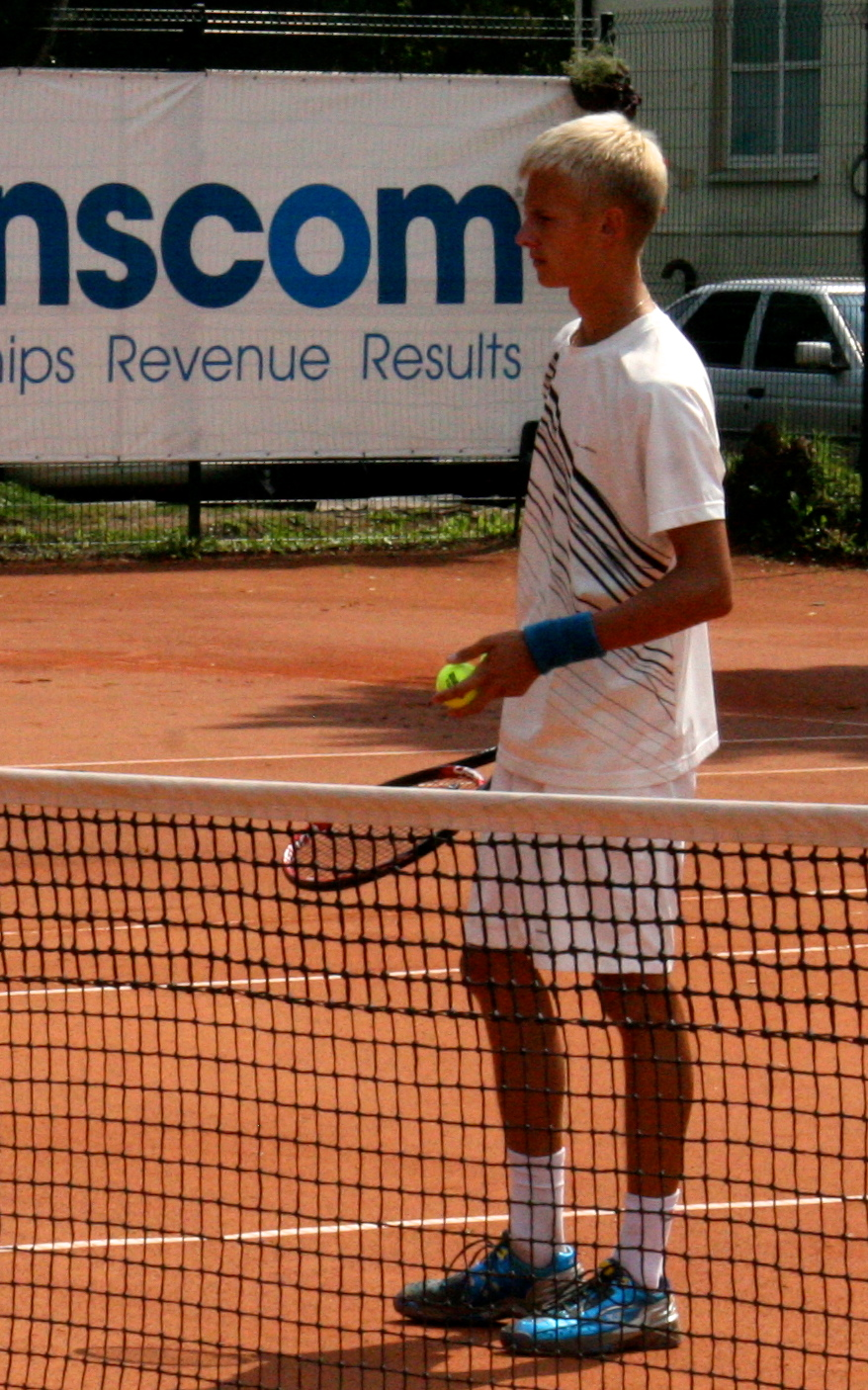
- Lithuanian President Cup 2012
- Country (sports): Lithuania
- Residence: Vilnius, Lithuania
- Born: December 7, 1994 (age 30) Vilnius, Lithuania
- Height: 1.84 m (6 ft 0 in)
- Retired: 2021 (last match played)
- Plays: Right-handed (two-handed backhand)
- Prize money: $41,038

Singles
- Career record: 4–9
- Highest ranking: No. 390 (30 January 2017)

Doubles
- Career record: 1–6
- Highest ranking: No. 284 (11 July 2016)
- Last updated on: 21 February 2023.

Lukas Mugevičius (born December 7, 1994) is a Lithuanian former professional tennis player and a member of Lithuania Davis Cup team.

Mugevičius reached his highest combined junior ranking of No. 81 in the world on ITF circuit on March 19, 2012.

Mugevičius was coached by his father Rimvydas Mugevičius.

== ATP Challenger Tour and ITF Men's Circuit finals ==
=== Singles: 2 (0–2) ===
| Legend ATP Challenger Tour (0–0) Futures (0–2) | Titles by surface Hard (0–1) Clay (0–1) Grass (0–0) Carpet (0–0) | Titles by surface Outdoors (0–1) Indoors (0–1) |

| Outcome | Date | Tournament | Surface | Opponent | Score |
|---|---|---|---|---|---|
| Runner-up | August 3, 2014 | Vilnius, Lithuania | Clay | (Moldova) Maxim Dubarenco | 1–6, 4–6 |
| Runner-up | November 16, 2014 | Pärnu, Estonia | Hard (i) | (Switzerland) Adrien Bossel | 7–6^{(7–2)}, 2–6, 4–6 |

=== Doubles: 7 (5–2) ===
| Legend ATP Challenger Tour (0–0) Futures (5–2) | Titles by surface Hard (2–1) Clay (3–1) Grass (0–0) Carpet (0–0) | Titles by surface Outdoors (4–2) Indoors (1–0) |

| Outcome | Date | Tournament | Surface | Partner | Opponents | Score |
|---|---|---|---|---|---|---|
| Runner-up | December 22, 2013 | Antalya, Turkey | Hard | (Netherlands) Alban Meuffels | (Bosnia and Herzegovina) Tomislav Brkić (Bosnia and Herzegovina) Aldin Šetkić | 2–6, 1–6 |
| Winner | May 11, 2014 | Ashkelon, Israel | Hard | (Israel) Dekel Bar | (Japan) Shotaro Joto (Japan) Kazuma Kawachi | 6–4, 7–5 |
| Runner-up | June 29, 2014 | Sibiu, Romania | Clay | (Argentina) Gaston-Arturo Grimolizzi | (Moldova) Andrei Ciumac (Romania) Petru-Alexandru Luncanu | 2–6, 3–6 |
| Winner | July 20, 2014 | Tallinn, Estonia | Clay | (Russia) Aleksandr Vasilenko | (Finland) Micke Kontinen (Australia) Andrew Whittington | 6–7^{(10–12)}, 6–3, [10–6] |
| Winner | August 31, 2014 | Brașov, Romania | Clay | (Romania) Bogdan Ionut Apostol | (Romania) Alexandru-Daniel Carpen (Italy) Claudio Fortuna | 2–6, 6–3, [10–8] |
| Winner | October 19, 2014 | Minsk, Belarus | Hard (i) | (Lithuania) Laurynas Grigelis | (Uzbekistan) Shonigmatjon Shofayziyev (Belarus) Andrei Vasilevski | 6–4, 4–6, [10–6] |
| Winner | August 31, 2014 | Brașov, Romania | Clay | (Romania) Bogdan Ionut Apostol | (Latvia) Mārtiņš Podžus (Latvia) Jānis Podžus | 6–4, 4–6, [13–11] |

== Davis Cup ==
Mugevičius is a member of the Lithuania Davis Cup team, having posted a 3–5 record in singles and a 1–3 record in doubles in eight ties played.

2010 Davis Cup Europe/Africa Zone Group II
| Round | Date | Opponents | Tie score | Venue | Surface | Match | Opponent | Rubber score |
| 2R | 9–11 July | Ireland | 3–2 | Dublin | Carpet (i) | Singles 4 (dead) | Conor Niland | 0–6, 2–6 (L) |
2011 Davis Cup Europe/Africa Zone Group II
| Round | Date | Opponents | Tie score | Venue | Surface | Match | Opponent | Rubber score |
| PO | 8–10 July | Morocco | 0–5 | Vilnius | Clay | Singles 1 | Reda El Amrani | 5–7, 1–6, 1–6 (L) |
| PO | 8–10 July | Morocco | 0–5 | Vilnius | Clay | Doubles (with Dovydas Šakinis) | Fattar & Khaddari | 4–6, 4–6, 6–3, 2–6 (L) |
2012 Davis Cup Europe Zone Group III
| Round | Date | Opponents | Tie score | Venue | Surface | Match | Opponent | Rubber score |
| RR | 3 May | San Marino | 3–0 | Sofia | Clay | Doubles (with Dovydas Šakinis) (dead) | de Rossi & Vicini | 6–0, 6–2 (W) |
| RR | 4 May | Andorra | 2–0 | Sofia | Clay | Singles 1 | Hector Hormigo-Herrera | 6–3, 6–3 (W) |
| RR | 4 May | Andorra | 2–0 | Sofia | Clay | Doubles (with Dovydas Šakinis) (dead) | Hormigo-Herrera & Poux-Gautier | not played |
2013 Davis Cup Europe/Africa Zone Group II
| Round | Date | Opponents | Tie score | Venue | Surface | Match | Opponent | Rubber score |
| 1R | 1–3 February | Cyprus | 4–1 | Šiauliai | Hard (i) | Doubles (with Ričardas Berankis) | Chrysochos & Cuzdriorean | 5–7, 6–3, 6–3, 4–6, 4–6 (L) |
| 1R | 1–3 February | Cyprus | 4–1 | Šiauliai | Hard (i) | Singles 5 (dead) | Christos Hadjigeorgiou | 6–3, 6–3 (W) |
| 2R | 5–7 April | Portugal | 0–5 | Lisbon | Clay | Singles 1 | Gastão Elias | 0–6, 1–6, 2–6 (L) |
| 2R | 5–7 April | Portugal | 0–5 | Lisbon | Clay | Doubles (with Mantas Bugailiškis) | Elias & Machado | 3–6, 0–6, 2–6 (L) |
| 2R | 5–7 April | Portugal | 0–5 | Lisbon | Clay | Singles 5 (dead) | Rui Machado | 2–6, 0–6 (L) |
2014 Davis Cup Europe/Africa Zone Group II
| Round | Date | Opponents | Tie score | Venue | Surface | Match | Opponent | Rubber score |
| 1R | 31 January–2 February 2014 | Norway | 5–0 | Oslo | Hard (i) | Singles 4 (dead) | Joachim Bjerke | 3–1, ret (W) |
| 3R | 12–14 September 2014 | Bosnia and Herzegovina | 3–2 | Sarajevo | Hard (i) | Singles 5 (dead) | Nerman Fatić | 7–6^{(8–6)}, 3–6, 4–6 (L) |
