= Dovydas Šakinis =

Lithuanian tennis player (born 1992)

- Country (sports): Lithuania
- Born: July 2, 1992 (age 33); Šiauliai, Lithuania
- Height: 1.89 m (6 ft 2 in)
- Plays: Left-handed (two-handed backhand)
- College: Dartmouth
- Prize money: $6,176

Singles
- Career record: 2–5
- Highest ranking: No. 808 (September 20, 2010)
- Current ranking: No. 1581 (May 13, 2013)

Doubles
- Career record: 0–3
- Highest ranking: No. 1214 (August 15, 2011)
- Last updated on: May 13, 2013.

Dovydas Šakinis (born July 2, 1992) is a Lithuanian professional tennis player and a member of Lithuania Davis Cup team.

Šakinis started playing tennis at the age of six, he trained at the Šiauliai tennis school. As a junior player he reached the world No. 73 combined ranking on ITF junior circuit (on January 4, 2010). Šakinis studied liberal arts at Dartmouth College in the United States from 2012 to 2016.

== Davis Cup ==
Šakinis is a member of the Lithuania Davis Cup team, having posted a 3–5 record in singles and a 1–3 record in doubles in ten ties played.

2009 Davis Cup Europe/Africa Zone Group II
Round	Date	Opponents	Tie score	Venue	Surface	Match	Opponent	Rubber score
1R	6–8 March 2009	Georgia	3–2	Vilnius	Hard (i)	Singles 5	Irakli Labadze	6–1, 6–2, 6–4 (W)
QF	10–12 July 2009	Slovenia	0–5	Otočec	Clay	Singles 5	Grega Žemlja	4–6, 6–2, 1–6 (L)
2010 Davis Cup Europe/Africa Zone Group II
Round	Date	Opponents	Tie score	Venue	Surface	Match	Opponent	Rubber score
1R	5–7 March	Great Britain	3–2	Vilnius	Hard (i)	Doubles (with Laurynas Grigelis)	Fleming & Skupski	0–6, 7–6^{(7–2)}, 5–7, 3–6 (L)
2R	9–11 July	Ireland	3–2	Dublin	Carpet (i)	Singles 5	James McGee	2–6, 3–6 (L)
2011 Davis Cup Europe/Africa Zone Group II
Round	Date	Opponents	Tie score	Venue	Surface	Match	Opponent	Rubber score
1R	4–6 March	Estonia	2–3	Tallinn	Hard (i)	Doubles (with Ričardas Berankis)	Zopp & Künnap	2–6, 3–6, 6–3, 3–6 (L)
1R	4–6 March	Estonia	2–3	Tallinn	Hard (i)	Singles 5	Jaak Põldma	1–6, 4–6, 6–1, 1–6 (L)
PO	8–10 July	Morocco	0–5	Vilnius	Clay	Singles 2	Yassine Idmbarek	6–2, 2–6, 3–6, 0–2 ret. (L)
PO	8–10 July	Morocco	0–5	Vilnius	Clay	Doubles (with Lukas Mugevičius)	Fattar & Khaddari	4–6, 4–6, 6–3, 2–6 (L)
2012 Davis Cup Europe Zone Group III
Round	Date	Opponents	Tie score	Venue	Surface	Match	Opponent	Rubber score
RR	3 May	San Marino	3–0	Sofia	Clay	Singles 1	Diego Zonzini	6–0, 6–2 (W)
RR	3 May	San Marino	3–0	Sofia	Clay	Doubles (with Lukas Mugevičius) (dead)	de Rossi & Vicini	6–0, 6–2 (W)
RR	4 May	Andorra	2–0	Sofia	Clay	Doubles (with Lukas Mugevičius) (dead)	Hormigo-Herrera & Poux-Gautier	not played
2013 Davis Cup Europe/Africa Zone Group II
Round	Date	Opponents	Tie score	Venue	Surface	Match	Opponent	Rubber score
1R	1–3 February	Cyprus	4–1	Šiauliai	Hard (i)	Singles 1	Rareş Cuzdriorean	6–2, 6–2, 1–6, 6–3 (W)
2R	5–7 April	Portugal	0–5	Lisbon	Clay	Singles 2	Pedro Sousa	2–6, 4–6, 0–6 (L)
