= Tommi Lenho =

Finnish professional tennis player

- Country (sports): Finland
- Born: 17 September 1975 (age 49); Heinola, Finland
- Plays: Right-handed
- Prize money: $57,575

Singles
- Career record: 3–0 (Davis Cup)
- Highest ranking: No. 291 (28 Sep 1998)

Grand Slam singles results
- US Open: Q1 (1995, 1998)

Doubles
- Career record: 0–2 (Davis Cup)
- Highest ranking: No. 320 (27 Jul 1998)

Tommi Lenho (born 17 September 1975) is a Finnish former professional tennis player.

Lenho, a two-time national singles champion, competed for the Finland Davis Cup team from 1994 to 1998 and was unbeaten in three singles rubbers, which included a win over France's Guillaume Raoux.

On the professional tour, Lenho reached a best singles ranking of 291 in the world, with qualifying draw appearances at the US Open. His best performance on the Challenger Tour was a runner-up finish at the Tampere Open in 1998.

== ITF Futures titles ==
=== Singles: (2) ===
No.	Date	Tournament	Surface	Opponent	Score
1.	Jun 1998	Finland F2, Vierumäki	Clay	(Finland) Tapio Nurminen	6–1, 6–3
2.	Jun 2005	Finland F1, Savitaipale	Clay	(Germany) Dominik Meffert	6–1, 7–5

=== Doubles: (2) ===
No.	Date	Tournament	Surface	Partner	Opponents	Score
1.	Jun 2000	France F11, Noisy-le-Grand	Clay	(France) Julien Cuaz	(France) Jérôme Haehnel (France) Vincent Lavergne	4–6, 6–0, 6–0
2.	Aug 2003	Lithuania F2, Šiauliai	Clay	(Spain) Daniel Lencina-Ribes	(Norway) Stian Boretti (Italy) Federico Torresi	7–6^{(1)}, 3–6, 6–3

== See also ==
- List of Finland Davis Cup team representatives
