= 2012 Davis Cup Europe Zone Group III =

International tennis competition

The Europe/Africa Zone is one of the three zones of regional Davis Cup competition in 2012.

In the Europe/Africa Zone there were three different tiers, called groups, in which teams competed against each other to advance to the upper tier. Group III was divided into a European zone and an African zone. The Group III Europe tournament was held in Bulgarian National Tennis Centre 'Carlsberg', Sofia, Bulgaria, May 2–5, on outdoor clay courts.

== Format ==
The 13 teams will be split into four pools. The winners of pool A and pool B will be drawn to play against the winners of pool C and pool D. Two winning nations will be promoted to Europe/Africa Zone Group II for 2013.

== Group stage ==
=== Group A ===
Team	Ties Played	Ties Won	Ties Lost	Matches Won	Matches Lost	Standing
Lithuania	2	2	0	5	0	1
Andorra	2	1	1	2	3	2
San Marino	2	0	2	1	5	3

==== Andorra vs. San Marino ====
Andorra
2
Bulgarian National Tennis Centre "Carlsberg", Sofia, Bulgaria
2 May 2012
Clay

San Marino
1

			1	2	3
1	(Andorra) (San Marino)	Gerard Florido; Diego Zonzini	1; 6	0; 6
2	(Andorra) (San Marino)	Jean-Baptiste Poux-Gautier; Marco De Rossi	6; 2	6; 1
3	(Andorra) (San Marino)	Jean-Baptiste Poux-Gautier / Jordi Vila-Vila; Domenico Vicini / Diego Zonzini	6; 3	7; 5

==== Lithuania vs. San Marino ====
Lithuania
3
Bulgarian National Tennis Centre "Carlsberg", Sofia, Bulgaria
3 May 2012
Clay

San Marino
0

			1	2	3
1	(Lithuania) (San Marino)	Dovydas Šakinis; Diego Zonzini	6; 0	6; 2
2	(Lithuania) (San Marino)	Laurynas Grigelis; Marco de Rossi	6; 2	6; 1
3	(Lithuania) (San Marino)	Lukas Mugevičius / Dovydas Šakinis; Marco de Rossi / Domenico Vicini	6; 0	6; 2

==== Andorra vs. Lithuania ====
Andorra
0
Bulgarian National Tennis Centre "Carlsberg", Sofia, Bulgaria
4 May 2012
Clay

Lithuania
2

			1	2	3
1	(Andorra) (Lithuania)	Hector Hormigo-Herrera; Lukas Mugevičius	3; 6	3; 6
2	(Andorra) (Lithuania)	Jean-Baptiste Poux-Gautier; Laurynas Grigelis	2; 6	4; 6
3	(Andorra) (Lithuania)	Hector Hormigo-Herrera / Jean-Baptiste Poux-Gautier; Lukas Mugevičius / Dovydas Šakinis				not played

=== Group B ===
Team	Ties Played	Ties Won	Ties Lost	Matches Won	Matches Lost	Standing
Bulgaria	2	2	0	6	0	1
Georgia	2	1	1	3	3	2
Albania	2	0	2	0	6	3

==== Albania vs. Bulgaria ====
Albania
0
Bulgarian National Tennis Centre "Carlsberg", Sofia, Bulgaria
2 May 2012
Clay

Bulgaria
3

			1	2	3
1	(Albania) (Bulgaria)	Rei Pelushi; Dimitar Kuzmanov	1; 6	0; 6
2	(Albania) (Bulgaria)	Flavio Deçe; Grigor Dimitrov	1; 6	1; 6
3	(Albania) (Bulgaria)	Rei Pelushi / Flavio Deçe; Todor Enev / Petar Trendafilov	0; 6	2; 6

==== Albania vs. Georgia ====
Albania
0
Bulgarian National Tennis Centre "Carlsberg", Sofia, Bulgaria
3 May 2012
Clay

Georgia
3

			1	2	3
1	(Albania) (Georgia (country))	Arber Sulstarova; Aleksandre Metreveli	1; 6	1; 6
2	(Albania) (Georgia (country))	Flavio Deçe; George Tsivadze	3; 6	0; 6
3	(Albania) (Georgia (country))	Rei Pelushi / Genajd Shypheja; Aleksandre Metreveli / George Tsivadze	0; 6	1; 6

==== Bulgaria vs. Georgia ====
Bulgaria
3
Bulgarian National Tennis Centre "Carlsberg", Sofia, Bulgaria
4 May 2012
Clay

Georgia
0

			1	2	3
1	(Bulgaria) (Georgia (country))	Dimitar Kuzmanov; Alexandre Metreveli	6; 3	6; 2
2	(Bulgaria) (Georgia (country))	Grigor Dimitrov; George Tsivadze	6; 4	6; 1
3	(Bulgaria) (Georgia (country))	Todor Enev / Petar Trendafilov; George Tsivadze / Alexandre Metreveli	6; 1	7^{7} 6^{4}

=== Group C ===
Team	Ties Played	Ties Won	Ties Lost	Matches Won	Matches Lost	Standing
Macedonia	2	2	0	5	0	1
Armenia	2	1	1	2	4	2
Montenegro	2	0	2	1	4	3

==== Armenia vs. Macedonia ====
Armenia
0
Bulgarian National Tennis Centre "Carlsberg", Sofia, Bulgaria
2 May 2012
Clay

Macedonia
3

			1	2	3
1	(Armenia) (North Macedonia)	Daniil Proskura; Shendrit Deari	2; 6	0; 6
2	(Armenia) (North Macedonia)	Ashot Gevorgyan; Tomislav Jotovski	6; 3	2; 6	0; 6
3	(Armenia) (North Macedonia)	Khachatur Khachatryan / Daniil Proskura; Predrag Rusevski / Danil Zelenkov	4; 6	6; 3	2; 6

==== Armenia vs. Montenegro ====
Armenia
2
Bulgarian National Tennis Centre "Carlsberg", Sofia, Bulgaria
3 May 2012
Clay

Montenegro
1

			1	2	3
1	(Armenia) (Montenegro)	Daniil Proskura; Igor Saveljic	6; 3	4; 6	6; 2
2	(Armenia) (Montenegro)	Khachatur Khachatryan; Ljubomir Čelebić	0; 6	3; 6
3	(Armenia) (Montenegro)	Khachatur Khachatryan / Daniil Proskura; Ljubomir Čelebić / Igor Saveljic	6; 1	7^{10} 6^{8}

==== Macedonia vs. Montenegro ====
Macedonia
2
Bulgarian National Tennis Centre "Carlsberg", Sofia, Bulgaria
4 May 2012
Clay

Montenegro
0

			1	2	3
1	(North Macedonia) (Montenegro)	Shendrit Deari; Igor Saveljic	6; 1	6; 0
2	(North Macedonia) (Montenegro)	Tomislav Jotovski; Ljubomir Čelebić	6; 2	6; 3
3	(North Macedonia) (Montenegro)	Predrag Rusevski / Danil Zelenkov; Ljubomir Čelebić / Pavle Rogan				not played

=== Group D ===
Team	Ties Played	Ties Won	Ties Lost	Matches Won	Matches Lost	Standing
Greece	3	3	0	8	1	1
Norway	3	2	1	7	2	2
Malta	3	1	2	2	7	3
Iceland	3	0	3	1	8	4

==== Greece vs. Malta ====
Greece
3
Bulgarian National Tennis Centre "Carlsberg", Sofia, Bulgaria
2 May 2012
Clay

Malta
0

			1	2	3
1	(Greece) (Malta)	Theodoros Angelinos; Matthew Asciak	6; 4	7; 6
2	(Greece) (Malta)	Paris Gemouchidis; Bradley Callus	6; 2	6; 0
3	(Greece) (Malta)	George Giotopoulos / Markos Kalovelonis; Matthew Asciak / Mark Gatt	6; 3	6; 4

==== Iceland vs. Norway ====
Iceland
0
Bulgarian National Tennis Centre "Carlsberg", Sofia, Bulgaria
2 May 2012
Clay

Norway
3

			1	2	3
1	(Iceland) (Norway)	Andri Jonsson; Stian Boretti	0; 6	1; 6
2	(Iceland) (Norway)	Birkir Gunnarsson; Erling Tveit	0; 6	0; 6
3	(Iceland) (Norway)	Birkir Gunnarsson / Andri Jonsson; Joachim Bjerke / Carl Sundberg	2; 6	3; 6

==== Malta vs. Norway ====
Malta
0
Bulgarian National Tennis Centre "Carlsberg", Sofia, Bulgaria
3 May 2012
Clay

Norway
3

			1	2	3
1	(Malta) (Norway)	Matthew Asciak; Stian Boretti	3; 6	1; 6
2	(Malta) (Norway)	Bradley Callus; Erling Tveit	1; 6	1; 6
3	(Malta) (Norway)	Matthew Asciak / Mark Gatt; Joachim Bjerke / Carl Sundberg	0; 6	1; 6

==== Greece vs. Iceland ====
Greece
3
Bulgarian National Tennis Centre "Carlsberg", Sofia, Bulgaria
3 May 2012
Clay

Iceland
0

			1	2	3
1	(Greece) (Iceland)	Theodoros Angelinos; Andri Jonsson	6; 0	6; 1
2	(Greece) (Iceland)	Paris Gemouchidis; Birkir Gunnarsson	6; 0	6; 1
3	(Greece) (Iceland)	George Giotopoulos / Markos Kalovelonis; Andri Jonsson / Birkir Gunnarsson	6; 2	6; 3

==== Greece vs. Norway ====
Greece
2
Bulgarian National Tennis Centre "Carlsberg", Sofia, Bulgaria
4 May 2012
Clay

Norway
1

			1	2	3
1	(Greece) (Norway)	Theodoros Angelinos; Stian Boretti	6; 2	6; 5
2	(Greece) (Norway)	Paris Gemouchidis; Erling Tveit	6^{4} 7^{7}	1; 6
3	(Greece) (Norway)	Theodoros Angelinos / Paris Gemouchidis; Stian Boretti / Erling Tveit	3; 6	6; 3	6; 4

==== Iceland vs. Malta ====
Iceland
1
Bulgarian National Tennis Centre "Carlsberg", Sofia, Bulgaria
4 May 2012
Clay

Malta
2

			1	2	3
1	(Iceland) (Malta)	Andri Jonsson; Denzil Agius	6; 4	4; 6	6; 4
2	(Iceland) (Malta)	Birkir Gunnarsson; Matthew Asciak	0; 6	0; 6
3	(Iceland) (Malta)	Andri Jonsson / Birkir Gunnarsson; Matthew Asciak / Mark Gatt	1; 6	3; 6

== Playoffs ==
=== 1st to 4th play-off ===
==== Lithuania vs Greece ====
Lithuania
2
Bulgarian National Tennis Centre "Carlsberg", Sofia, Bulgaria
5 May 2012
Clay

Greece
1

			1	2	3
1	(Lithuania) (Greece)	Laurynas Grigelis; Theodoros Angelinos	5; 7	7^{10} 6^{8}	4; 6
2	(Lithuania) (Greece)	Ričardas Berankis; Paris Gemouchidis	7^{7} 6^{4}	6; 3
3	(Lithuania) (Greece)	Ričardas Berankis / Laurynas Grigelis; Paris Gemouchidis / Markos Kalovelonis	6; 2	7; 5

==== Bulgaria vs Macedonia ====
Bulgaria
3
Bulgarian National Tennis Centre "Carlsberg", Sofia, Bulgaria
5 May 2012
Clay

Macedonia
0

			1	2	3
1	(Bulgaria) (North Macedonia)	Dimitar Kuzmanov; Shendrit Deari	1; 6	6; 2	7; 5
2	(Bulgaria) (North Macedonia)	Grigor Dimitrov; Tomislav Jotovski	6; 0	6; 0
3	(Bulgaria) (North Macedonia)	Todor Enev / Petar Trendafilov; Tomislav Jotovski / Danil Zelenkov	6; 3	6; 3

=== 5th to 8th play-off ===
==== Andorra vs Norway ====
Andorra
1
Bulgarian National Tennis Centre "Carlsberg", Sofia, Bulgaria
5 May 2012
Clay

Norway
2

			1	2	3
1	(Andorra) (Norway)	Hector Hormigo-Herrera; Stian Boretti	0; 6	3; 6
2	(Andorra) (Norway)	Jean-Baptiste Poux-Gautier; Erling Tveit	7^{7} 6^{1}	6^{4} 7^{7}	6; 4
3	(Andorra) (Norway)	Gerard Florido / Hector Hormigo-Herrera; Stian Boretti / Erling Tveit	2; 6	1; 6

==== Georgia vs Armenia ====
Georgia
3
Bulgarian National Tennis Centre "Carlsberg", Sofia, Bulgaria
5 May 2012
Clay

Armenia
0

			1	2	3
1	(Georgia (country)) (Armenia)	Aleksandre Metreveli; Mikayel Avetisyan	6; 2	6; 1
2	(Georgia (country)) (Armenia)	George Tsivadze; Daniil Proskura	5; 7	6; 2	6; 4
3	(Georgia (country)) (Armenia)	Mikheil Khmiadashvili / Aleksandre Metreveli; Ashot Gevorgyan / Khachatur Khachatryan	5; 7	6; 3	6; 4

=== 9th to 12th play-off ===
==== San Marino vs Malta ====
San Marino
1
Bulgarian National Tennis Centre "Carlsberg", Sofia, Bulgaria
5 May 2012
Clay

Malta
2

			1	2	3
1	(San Marino) (Malta)	Marco de Rossi; Matthew Asciak	2; 6	2; 6
2	(San Marino) (Malta)	Diego Zonzini; Bradley Callus	6; 1	1; 6	2; 6
3	(San Marino) (Malta)	Marco de Rossi / Domenico Vicini; Denzil Agius / Mark Gatt	6; 2	6; 4

==== Albania vs Montenegro ====
Albania
0
Bulgarian National Tennis Centre "Carlsberg", Sofia, Bulgaria
5 May 2012
Clay

Montenegro
3

			1	2	3
1	(Albania) (Montenegro)	Genajd Shypheja; Pavle Rogan	2; 6	0; 6
2	(Albania) (Montenegro)	Flavio Deçe; Ljubomir Čelebić	1; 6	1; 6
3	(Albania) (Montenegro)	Flavio Deçe / Rei Pelushi; Pavle Rogan / Igor Saveljic	6^{2} 7^{7}	2; 6

== Final standings ==
Rank	Team
1	Bulgaria
1	Lithuania
3	Greece
3	North Macedonia
5	Georgia
5	Norway
7	Andorra
7	Armenia
9	Malta
9	Montenegro
11	Albania
11	San Marino
13	Iceland

- Bulgaria and Lithuania were promoted to Europe/Africa Zone Group II in 2013.
