= Lithuanian Tennis Association =

Governing body

The Lithuanian Tennis Union (Lietuvos Teniso Sąjunga) is the national governing body for the sport of tennis in Lithuania. LTS was created to standardize rules and regulations and to promote and develop the growth of tennis in Lithuania.

The LTS includes 173 players including world number 77 Ričardas Berankis and has 47 coaches.

The current president is Ramūnas Grušas.

In 2023, the Lithuanian Tennis Union was forced to host Russian and Belarusian players despite the Union's position that players from the countries should be banned following the Russian invasion of Ukraine due to International Tennis Federation rules requiring they be allowed to play.
