= Aivaras Balžekas =

Lithuanian tennis player (1982–2005)

- Country (sports): Lithuania
- Born: April 8, 1982; Šiauliai, Lithuanian SSR, Soviet Union
- Died: October 10, 2005 (aged 23); Delray Beach, Florida, U.S.
- Height: 1.80 m (5 ft 11 in)
- Plays: Right-handed
- College: Lynn University
- Prize money: $5,328

Singles
- Career record: 0–0
- Highest ranking: No. 926 (July 8, 2002)

Doubles
- Career record: 0–0
- Highest ranking: No. 939 (October 15, 2001)

Aivaras Balžekas (April 8, 1982 – October 10, 2005) was a Lithuanian professional tennis player and a member of Lynn University's tennis team.

Balzekas was a member of the Lithuania Davis Cup team and earned a career-high ATP singles ranking of world no. 926 in 2002. He played for one season at Lynn in Boca Raton, Florida, and had earned several honors and titles, including finishing the 2005 season ranked 11th in American college tennis. This continued a successful career that began at Auburn University–Montgomery, where he was a member of the 2004 NAIA national championship team.

Balzekas died at a Florida hospital where he was taken after being struck by a motorist. The collision occurred on October 8, 2005. At the time he was helping a friend push a disabled vehicle along the side of a road. A Boca Raton man named David Walsh was sentenced to a year and one day in prison for the death of Balzekas. He pleaded guilty to driving drunk and killing Balzekas.
