= Lithuania Davis Cup team =

Lithuanian national tennis team

Lithuania
- Captain: Rimvydas Mugevičius
- Nations Ranking: 38 ▼2 (21 September 2026)
- Highest ranking: 36 (9 February 2026)
- Colors: Green & White
- First year: 1994
- Years played: 32
- Ties played (W–L): 105 (60 – 45)
- Best finish: Europe/Africa Zone Group I first round (2015)
- Most total wins: Rolandas Muraška (56)
- Most singles wins: Rolandas Muraška (37)
- Most doubles wins: Rolandas Muraška (19)
- Best doubles team: Daniel Lencina-Ribes & Gvidas Sabeckis (6)
- Most ties played: Rolandas Muraška (49)
- Most years played: Ričardas Berankis (15)

The Lithuania men's national tennis team represents Lithuania in Davis Cup tennis competition, and are governed by the Lithuanian Tennis Association.

Lithuania has never been a tennis country – no tennis player from Lithuania entered ATP top 500 until 2008. However, the situation is changing in recent years. Currently young Lithuanian players are winning the greatest tennis victories in the history of Lithuania, making tennis a major sport in the country. Now, Lithuania has many tennis players.

In 2012 Lithuania competed in the third group of Davis Cup, where they won all three ties and got promoted to the second group. It played seven times there. Also, it has competed in the third group for 13 times. And once have been promoted to group one, where Lithuania team is currently playing.

== Current team (2015) ==
Player information and rankings as of 8 March 2015

Squad representing Lithuania vs. Poland (2015 Europe/Africa Group 1 First Round)
Player	Current singles ranking	Current doubles ranking	First year played	Ties played	Total W–L	Singles W–L	Doubles W–L
Ričardas Berankis	76	553	2007	13	17–9	14–5	3–4
Laurynas Grigelis	361	132	2008	9	7–9	4–7	3–2
Lukas Mugevičius	642	417	2010	6	3–7	2–4	1–3
Mantas Bugailiškis (young player)	N/A	N/A	2013	1	0–1	0–0	0–1

=== Other players ===
- Julius Tverijonas
- Benas Majauskas

== History ==
Lithuania started its Davis Cup history in 1994 with competing in the Europe and Africa zone of Group III.

== Present ==
Lithuania started 2009 Davis Cup with their first ever victory in Group II. In the first round, Lithuania defeated Georgia 3–2 in front of a home crowd in a recently built SEB arena. All work was done by the youngest members of the Lithuanian team – 18-year-old Ričardas Berankis won both of his singles matches and 16-year-old Dovydas Šakinis defeated the leader of Georgian team Irakli Labadze in the decisive rubber. For the second round match-up, Lithuania went to Otočec to play against Slovenia. However, the Slovenian team with Grega Žemlja and Blaž Kavčič was too strong for Lithuania, which won only one set in five matches, and the tie ended 0–5.

In 2010 Lithuania had its better performance. For the first round match-up Lithuania drew the top seeded British team in Lithuania. With James Ward defeating Laurynas Grigelis, Great Britain winning the doubles match and Berankis winning both of his singles matches the tie came to the decisive rubber. Grigelis won a five-setter against Daniel Evans and against all odds Lithuania celebrated a 3–2 victory over Great Britain. Lithuania's next round was against Irish team led by Conor Niland and James McGee in Dublin. Lithuania celebrated after the second day when Berankis and Grigelis won the first three matches and secured the tie. Ireland won the remaining dead rubbers with Lithuania winning the tie 3–2. In the third round Lithuania had a rematch of last year's tie against Slovenia, only this time Slovenian team came to Vilnius. The best two Lithuanian tennis players Berankis and Grigelis represented Lithuania in all five matches but they won only two of them – Berankis defeated Blaž Kavčič in the first rubber and Lithuania came back from two sets to love down in the doubles match. Eventually, Lithuania ended up losing 2–3 and Slovenia was promoted to the first group.

Lithuania came into the 2011 Davis Cup with high hopes but the dreams were crashed in the first round tie against Estonia in Tallinn. During the second rubber Grigelis got a knee injury and not only lost the match but also had to skip the remaining tie. Grigelis was replaced by Dovydas Šakinis who was still recovering from pneumonia so couldn't play his best tennis. Although Berankis won both of his singles matches, Lithuania lost the tie 2–3. The fourth rubber between Berankis and Jürgen Zopp took 3 hours 46 minutes and it was the longest rubber for both teams in their histories. After the first round loss Lithuania faced a relegation play-off against Morocco in Vilnius, where neither Berankis nor Grigelis helped Lithuania. The Lithuanian team, with only one ranked player and all players being under 19, lost to Morocco 0-5 which led to the relegation to the third group for the following year.

In 2012, Lithuania was competing in Group III. In the group stage Lithuania defeated Andorra and San Marino without losing a set. For the promotion play-off Lithuania faced the Greek team. In the first rubber Grigelis lost a tough match to Theodoros Angelinos but Berankis restored the parity by defeating Paris Gemouchidis. In the decisive rubber, Lithuanian leaders won a doubles match and the tie ended 2–1. Lithuania got promoted to the Group II for the following year.

In 2013, Lithuania was drawn to play against Cyprus in the first round of the Europe/Africa Zone Group II.

In 2014 Lithuania team defeated South Africa, Norway and Bosnia and Herzegovina and was promoted to Europe/Africa Zone Group I for the first time in 2015.

== Statistics ==
- Total record 45–33 (58%)

=== Head-to-head record ===
- Algeria 0–1
- Andorra 2–1
- Angola 1–0
- Armenia 2–1
- Azerbaijan 1–0
- Bosnia and Herzegovina 3–2
- Botswana 2–0
- Congo 1–0
- Cyprus 3–0
- Egypt 0–3
- Estonia 1–6
- Ethiopia 1–0
- Georgia 2–0
- Greece 1–0
- Ghana 1–1
- Great Britain 1–0
- Hungary 0–1
- Iceland 3–0
- Ireland 1–1
- Ivory Coast 0–1
- Kenya 2–0
- Latvia 0–1
- Luxembourg 0–1
- Macedonia 1–1
- Madagascar 2–0
- Malta 1–0
- Morocco 0–1
- Moldova 2–2
- Monaco 1–2
- Namibia 2–0
- Nigeria 1–0
- Norway 1–0
- Poland 0–1
- Portugal 0–1
- San Marino 2–0
- Senegal 1–0
- Slovakia 0–1
- Slovenia 0–2
- Sudan 1–0
- Tunisia 2–0
- Turkey 2–2
- FR Yugoslavia 0–1

=== Group record ===
- Europe/Africa zone group II 4–11 (27%)
- Europe/Africa zone group III 41–22 (65%)

=== Home and away record ===
Group II:

- Performance in Lithuania 3–6 (33%)
- Performance away 1–5 (17%)

Group III:

- Performance in Lithuania 2–2 (50%)
- Performance away 39–20 (66%)

=== Surface record ===
- Carpet courts 3–5 (38%)
- Clay courts 30–23 (57%)
- Grass courts 0–0 (-%)
- Hard courts 12–5 (71%)

=== Matches record ===
- Singles 108–78 (58%)
- Doubles 70–80 (47%)
- Total 178–158 (53%)

Statistics correct as of the end of the season in 2013.

== All players ==
Player	Highest singles ranking	Highest doubles ranking	First year played	Years played	Ties played	Total W–L	Singles W–L	Doubles W–L
Tadas Babelis	1,142	803	2015	5	9	2–9	0–6	2–3
Aivaras Balžekas	926	939	1999	5	19	10–13	9–12	1–1
Ričardas Berankis	50	139	2007	15	29	45–17	36–9	9–8
Mantas Bugailiškis	N/A	N/A	2013	2	2	1–1	1–0	0–1
Edas Butvilas	N/A	N/A	2022	9		6–9	4–4	2–5
Eugenijus Cariovas	N/A	N/A	2006	2	8	8–5	2–3	6–2
Mindaugas Čeledinas	N/A	N/A	2006	2	3	0–4	0–1	0–3
Artūras Gotovskis	N/A	N/A	2005	1	2	1–1	0–1	1–0
Julius Gotovskis	N/A	N/A	2011	1	1	0–1	0–1	0–0
Laurynas Grigelis	183	132	2008	4	9	7–9	4–7	3–2
Denis Ivancovas	N/A	N/A	1994	3	8	7–4	2–2	5–2
Paulius Jurkėnas	N/A	1,434	2000	2	5	1–4	0–0	1–4
Aurimas Karpavičius	N/A	N/A	2003	1	2	0–2	0–1	0–1
Daniel Lencina-Ribes	591	671	2005	5	20	19–9	11–4	8–5
Gitanas Mažonas	N/A	N/A	1994	4	13	10–7	7–4	3–3
Lukas Mugevičius	N/A	1,513	2010	4	6	3–7	2–4	1–3
Rolandas Muraška	575	1,100	1994	12	49	56–32	37–12	19–20
Tomas Petrauskas	N/A	N/A	1998	1	2	2–1	1–0	1–1
Vadim Pinko	N/A	N/A	2009	1	1	0–1	0–0	0–1
Denis Riabuchin	N/A	N/A	2006	1	2	0–2	0–0	0–2
Arūnas Rozga	N/A	N/A	1999	2	8	4–4	0–0	4–4
Gvidas Sabeckis	488	548	2002	8	31	23–21	11–7	12–14
Dovydas Šakinis	808	1,214	2009	5	10	4–8	3–5	1–3
Aistis Šlajus	1,346	1,434	1998	3	11	6–10	4–7	2–3
Julius Tverijonas	1,418	N/A	2011	1	1	0–1	0–1	0–0
Giedrius Vėželis	N/A	N/A	1994	1	3	1–2	1–0	0–2
Kasparas Žemaitėlis	N/A	N/A	2013	1	1	0–1	0–1	0–0

== Results ==
=== 1994–1999 ===
Year	Group	Team	Round	Date	Location	Surface	Opponent	Score	Outcome
1994	Europe/Africa Zone; Group III	Denis Ivancovas, Gitanas Mažonas, Rolandas Muraška, Giedrius Vėželis, Team capitan: Remigijus Balžekas	RR	18 May	Bratislava, Slovakia	Clay	Tunisia	3–0	Won
1994	Europe/Africa Zone; Group III	Denis Ivancovas, Gitanas Mažonas, Rolandas Muraška, Giedrius Vėželis, Team capitan: Remigijus Balžekas	RR	19 May	Bratislava, Slovakia	Clay	Cyprus	2–1	Won
1994	Europe/Africa Zone; Group III	Denis Ivancovas, Gitanas Mažonas, Rolandas Muraška, Giedrius Vėželis, Team capitan: Remigijus Balžekas	RR	20 May	Bratislava, Slovakia	Clay	Congo	3–0	Won
1994	Europe/Africa Zone; Group III	Denis Ivancovas, Gitanas Mažonas, Rolandas Muraška, Giedrius Vėželis, Team capitan: Remigijus Balžekas	1R	21 May	Bratislava, Slovakia	Clay	Malta	2–1	Won
1994	Europe/Africa Zone; Group III	Denis Ivancovas, Gitanas Mažonas, Rolandas Muraška, Giedrius Vėželis, Team capitan: Remigijus Balžekas	F	22 May	Bratislava, Slovakia	Clay	Slovakia	0–3	Lost
1995	Europe/Africa Zone; Group II	Denis Ivancovas, Gitanas Mažonas, Rolandas Muraška, Team capitan: Remigijus Balžekas	1R	28–30 April	Šiauliai, Lithuania	Carpet (i)	Luxembourg	1–4	Lost
1995	Europe/Africa Zone; Group II	Denis Ivancovas, Gitanas Mažonas, Rolandas Muraška, Team capitan: Remigijus Balžekas	PO	14–16 July	Vilnius, Lithuania	Clay	Poland	1–4	Lost
1996	Europe/Africa Zone; Group III	Eugenius Cariovas, Denis Ivancovas, Gitanas Mažonas, Rolandas Muraška, Team capitan: Remigijus Balžekas	RR	21 May	Istanbul, Turkey	Hard	Iceland	3–0	Won
1996	Europe/Africa Zone; Group III	Eugenius Cariovas, Denis Ivancovas, Gitanas Mažonas, Rolandas Muraška, Team capitan: Remigijus Balžekas	RR	22 May	Istanbul, Turkey	Hard	Ethiopia	3–0	Won
1996	Europe/Africa Zone; Group III	Eugenius Cariovas, Denis Ivancovas, Gitanas Mažonas, Rolandas Muraška, Team capitan: Remigijus Balžekas	RR	23 May	Istanbul, Turkey	Hard	San Marino	3–0	Won
1996	Europe/Africa Zone; Group III	Eugenius Cariovas, Denis Ivancovas, Gitanas Mažonas, Rolandas Muraška, Team capitan: Remigijus Balžekas	RR	24 May	Istanbul, Turkey	Hard	Azerbaijan	3–0	Won
1996	Europe/Africa Zone; Group III	Eugenius Cariovas, Denis Ivancovas, Gitanas Mažonas, Rolandas Muraška, Team capitan: Remigijus Balžekas	RR	25 May	Istanbul, Turkey	Hard	Sudan	3–0	Won
1996	Europe/Africa Zone; Group III	Eugenius Cariovas, Denis Ivancovas, Gitanas Mažonas, Rolandas Muraška, Team capitan: Remigijus Balžekas	RR	26 May	Istanbul, Turkey	Hard	Senegal	3–0	Won
1997	Europe/Africa Zone; Group II	Eugenijus Cariovas, Rolandas Muraška, Team capitan: Gracijus Remeikis	1R	2–4 May	Vilnius, Lithuania	Carpet (i)	FR Yugoslavia	2–3	Lost
1997	Europe/Africa Zone; Group II	Eugenijus Cariovas, Rolandas Muraška, Team capitan: Gracijus Remeikis	PO	11–14 July	Cairo, Egypt	Clay	Egypt	2–3	Lost
1998	Europe/Africa Zone; Group III	Rolandas Muraška, Tomas Petrauskas, Aistis Šlajus, Team capitan: Gracijus Remeikis	RR	20 May	Skopje, Macedonia	Clay	Moldova	1–2	Lost
1998	Europe/Africa Zone; Group III	Rolandas Muraška, Tomas Petrauskas, Aistis Šlajus, Team capitan: Gracijus Remeikis	RR	21 May	Skopje, Macedonia	Clay	Tunisia	3–0	Won
1998	Europe/Africa Zone; Group III	Rolandas Muraška, Tomas Petrauskas, Aistis Šlajus, Team capitan: Gracijus Remeikis	RR	22 May	Skopje, Macedonia	Clay	Macedonia	2–1	Won
1998	Europe/Africa Zone; Group III	Rolandas Muraška, Tomas Petrauskas, Aistis Šlajus, Team capitan: Gracijus Remeikis	1R	23 May	Skopje, Macedonia	Clay	Turkey	2–1	Lost
1998	Europe/Africa Zone; Group III	Rolandas Muraška, Tomas Petrauskas, Aistis Šlajus, Team capitan: Gracijus Remeikis	F	24 May	Skopje, Macedonia	Clay	Nigeria	2–1	Won
1999	Europe/Africa Zone; Group III	Aivaras Balžekas, Rolandas Muraška, Arūnas Rozga, Aistis Šlajus, Team capitan: Gracijus Remeikis	RR	9 June	Tallinn, Estonia	Clay	Armenia	1–2	Lost
1999	Europe/Africa Zone; Group III	Aivaras Balžekas, Rolandas Muraška, Arūnas Rozga, Aistis Šlajus, Team capitan: Gracijus Remeikis	RR	10 June	Tallinn, Estonia	Clay	Georgia	2–1	Won
1999	Europe/Africa Zone; Group III	Aivaras Balžekas, Rolandas Muraška, Arūnas Rozga, Aistis Šlajus, Team capitan: Gracijus Remeikis	RR	11 June	Tallinn, Estonia	Clay	Kenya	2–1	Won
1999	Europe/Africa Zone; Group III	Aivaras Balžekas, Rolandas Muraška, Arūnas Rozga, Aistis Šlajus, Team capitan: Gracijus Remeikis	1R	12 June	Tallinn, Estonia	Clay	Moldova	2–1	Won
1999	Europe/Africa Zone; Group III	Aivaras Balžekas, Rolandas Muraška, Arūnas Rozga, Aistis Šlajus, Team capitan: Gracijus Remeikis	F	13 June	Tallinn, Estonia	Clay	Estonia	1–2	Lost

=== 2000–2009 ===
Year	Group	Team	Round	Date	Location	Surface	Opponent	Score	Outcome
2000	Europe/Africa Zone; Group II	Aivaras Balžekas, Rolandas Muraška, Paulius Jurkėnas	1R	28–30 April	Šiauliai, Lithuania	Carpet (i)	Ivory Coast	2–3	Lost
2000	Europe/Africa Zone; Group II	Aivaras Balžekas, Rolandas Muraška, Paulius Jurkėnas	PO	21–23 July	İzmir, Turkey	Hard	Turkey	1–4	Lost
2001	Europe/Africa Zone; Group III	Rolandas Muraška, Arūnas Rozga, Aistis Šlajus, Playing capitan: Gitanas Mažonas	RR	16 May	Gaborone, Botswana	Hard	Iceland	3–0	Won
2001	Europe/Africa Zone; Group III	Rolandas Muraška, Arūnas Rozga, Aistis Šlajus, Playing capitan: Gitanas Mažonas	RR	17 May	Gaborone, Botswana	Hard	Botswana	2–1	Won
2001	Europe/Africa Zone; Group III	Rolandas Muraška, Arūnas Rozga, Aistis Šlajus, Playing capitan: Gitanas Mažonas	RR	18 May	Gaborone, Botswana	Hard	Ghana	1–2	Lost
2001	Europe/Africa Zone; Group III	Rolandas Muraška, Arūnas Rozga, Aistis Šlajus, Playing capitan: Gitanas Mažonas	1R	19 May	Gaborone, Botswana	Hard	Latvia	1–2	Lost
2001	Europe/Africa Zone; Group III	Rolandas Muraška, Arūnas Rozga, Aistis Šlajus, Playing capitan: Gitanas Mažonas	F	20 May	Gaborone, Botswana	Hard	Madagascar	2–1	Won
2002	Europe/Africa Zone; Group III	Aivaras Balžekas, Rolandas Muraška, Gvidas Sabeckis, Playing capitan: Gitanas Mažonas	RR	3 April	Antalya, Turkey	Clay	Andorra	1–2	Lost
2002	Europe/Africa Zone; Group III	Aivaras Balžekas, Rolandas Muraška, Gvidas Sabeckis, Playing capitan: Gitanas Mažonas	RR	4 April	Antalya, Turkey	Clay	Namibia	3–0	Won
2002	Europe/Africa Zone; Group III	Aivaras Balžekas, Rolandas Muraška, Gvidas Sabeckis, Playing capitan: Gitanas Mažonas	RR	5 April	Antalya, Turkey	Clay	Monaco	0–3	Lost
2002	Europe/Africa Zone; Group III	Aivaras Balžekas, Rolandas Muraška, Gvidas Sabeckis, Playing capitan: Gitanas Mažonas	PO	6 April	Antalya, Turkey	Clay	Botswana	3–0	Won
2002	Europe/Africa Zone; Group III	Aivaras Balžekas, Rolandas Muraška, Gvidas Sabeckis, Playing capitan: Gitanas Mažonas	PO	7 April	Antalya, Turkey	Clay	Iceland	3–0	Won
2003	Europe/Africa Zone; Group III	Aivaras Balžekas, Aurimas Karpavičius, Rolandas Muraška, Gvidas Sabeckis, Team capitan: Gitanas Mažonas	RR	3 February	Sidi Fredj, Algeria	Clay	Armenia	3–0	Won
2003	Europe/Africa Zone; Group III	Aivaras Balžekas, Aurimas Karpavičius, Rolandas Muraška, Gvidas Sabeckis, Team capitan: Gitanas Mažonas	RR	4 February	Sidi Fredj, Algeria	Clay	Angola	2–1	Won
2003	Europe/Africa Zone; Group III	Aivaras Balžekas, Aurimas Karpavičius, Rolandas Muraška, Gvidas Sabeckis, Team capitan: Gitanas Mažonas	RR	5 February	Sidi Fredj, Algeria	Clay	Algeria	1–2	Lost
2003	Europe/Africa Zone; Group III	Aivaras Balžekas, Aurimas Karpavičius, Rolandas Muraška, Gvidas Sabeckis, Team capitan: Gitanas Mažonas	PO	6 February	Sidi Fredj, Algeria	Clay	Hungary	0–3	Lost
2003	Europe/Africa Zone; Group III	Aivaras Balžekas, Aurimas Karpavičius, Rolandas Muraška, Gvidas Sabeckis, Team capitan: Gitanas Mažonas	PO	7 February	Sidi Fredj, Algeria	Clay	Estonia	1–2	Lost
2004	Europe/Africa Zone; Group III	Aivaras Balžekas, Paulius Jurkėnas, Rolandas Muraška, Gvidas Sabeckis, Team capitan: Rimvydas Mugevičius	RR	4 February	Kaunas, Lithuania	Carpet (i)	Cyprus	2–1	Won
2004	Europe/Africa Zone; Group III	Aivaras Balžekas, Paulius Jurkėnas, Rolandas Muraška, Gvidas Sabeckis, Team capitan: Rimvydas Mugevičius	RR	6 February	Kaunas, Lithuania	Carpet (i)	Estonia	1–2	Lost
2004	Europe/Africa Zone; Group III	Aivaras Balžekas, Paulius Jurkėnas, Rolandas Muraška, Gvidas Sabeckis, Team capitan: Rimvydas Mugevičius	PO	7 February	Kaunas, Lithuania	Carpet (i)	Monaco	2–1	Won
2004	Europe/Africa Zone; Group III	Aivaras Balžekas, Paulius Jurkėnas, Rolandas Muraška, Gvidas Sabeckis, Team capitan: Rimvydas Mugevičius	PO	8 February	Kaunas, Lithuania	Carpet (i)	Macedonia	1–2	Lost
2005	Europe/Africa Zone; Group III	Artūras Gotovskis, Daniel Lencina-Ribes, Rolandas Muraška, Gvidas Sabeckis, Team capitan: Rimvydas Mugevičius	RR	27 April	Cairo, Egypt	Clay	Bosnia and Herzegovina	2–1	Won
2005	Europe/Africa Zone; Group III	Artūras Gotovskis, Daniel Lencina-Ribes, Rolandas Muraška, Gvidas Sabeckis, Team capitan: Rimvydas Mugevičius	RR	28 April	Cairo, Egypt	Clay	Madagascar	3–0	Won
2005	Europe/Africa Zone; Group III	Artūras Gotovskis, Daniel Lencina-Ribes, Rolandas Muraška, Gvidas Sabeckis, Team capitan: Rimvydas Mugevičius	RR	29 April	Cairo, Egypt	Clay	Egypt	1–2	Lost
2005	Europe/Africa Zone; Group III	Artūras Gotovskis, Daniel Lencina-Ribes, Rolandas Muraška, Gvidas Sabeckis, Team capitan: Rimvydas Mugevičius	PO	30 April	Cairo, Egypt	Clay	Kenya	3–0	Won
2005	Europe/Africa Zone; Group III	Artūras Gotovskis, Daniel Lencina-Ribes, Rolandas Muraška, Gvidas Sabeckis, Team capitan: Rimvydas Mugevičius	PO	1 May	Cairo, Egypt	Clay	Namibia	2–1	Won
2006	Europe/Africa Zone; Group III	Mindaugas Čeledinas, Daniel Lencina-Ribes, Denis Riabuchin, Gvidas Sabeckis, Team capitan: Rimvydas Mugevičius	RR	19 July	Banja Luka, Bosnia and Herzegovina	Clay	Andorra	3–0	Won
2006	Europe/Africa Zone; Group III	Mindaugas Čeledinas, Daniel Lencina-Ribes, Denis Riabuchin, Gvidas Sabeckis, Team capitan: Rimvydas Mugevičius	RR	20 July	Banja Luka, Bosnia and Herzegovina	Clay	Estonia	1–2	Lost
2006	Europe/Africa Zone; Group III	Mindaugas Čeledinas, Daniel Lencina-Ribes, Denis Riabuchin, Gvidas Sabeckis, Team capitan: Rimvydas Mugevičius	RR	21 July	Banja Luka, Bosnia and Herzegovina	Clay	Armenia	2–1	Won
2006	Europe/Africa Zone; Group III	Mindaugas Čeledinas, Daniel Lencina-Ribes, Denis Riabuchin, Gvidas Sabeckis, Team capitan: Rimvydas Mugevičius	PO	22 July	Banja Luka, Bosnia and Herzegovina	Clay	Turkey	2–1	Won
2006	Europe/Africa Zone; Group III	Mindaugas Čeledinas, Daniel Lencina-Ribes, Denis Riabuchin, Gvidas Sabeckis, Team capitan: Rimvydas Mugevičius	PO	23 July	Banja Luka, Bosnia and Herzegovina	Clay	Monaco	0–3	Lost
2007	Europe/Africa Zone; Group III	Ričardas Berankis, Daniel Lencina-Ribes, Simas Kučas, Gvidas Sabeckis, Team capitan: Rimvydas Mugevičius	RR	9 May	Cairo, Egypt	Clay	Ireland	1–2	Lost
2007	Europe/Africa Zone; Group III	Ričardas Berankis, Daniel Lencina-Ribes, Simas Kučas, Gvidas Sabeckis, Team capitan: Rimvydas Mugevičius	RR	10 May	Cairo, Egypt	Clay	Bosnia and Herzegovina	2–1	Won
2007	Europe/Africa Zone; Group III	Ričardas Berankis, Daniel Lencina-Ribes, Simas Kučas, Gvidas Sabeckis, Team capitan: Rimvydas Mugevičius	RR	11 May	Cairo, Egypt	Clay	Moldova	2–1	Won
2007	Europe/Africa Zone; Group III	Ričardas Berankis, Daniel Lencina-Ribes, Simas Kučas, Gvidas Sabeckis, Team capitan: Rimvydas Mugevičius	PO	12 May	Cairo, Egypt	Clay	Turkey	2–1	Won
2007	Europe/Africa Zone; Group III	Ričardas Berankis, Daniel Lencina-Ribes, Simas Kučas, Gvidas Sabeckis, Team capitan: Rimvydas Mugevičius	PO	13 May	Cairo, Egypt	Clay	Egypt	1–2	Lost
2008	Europe/Africa Zone; Group III	Mindaugas Čeledinas, Laurynas Grigelis, Gvidas Sabeckis, Playing capitan: Daniel Lencina-Ribes	RR	7 May	Yerevan, Armenia	Clay	Estonia	1–2	Lost
2008	Europe/Africa Zone; Group III	Mindaugas Čeledinas, Laurynas Grigelis, Gvidas Sabeckis, Playing capitan: Daniel Lencina-Ribes	RR	8 May	Yerevan, Armenia	Clay	Ghana	3–0	Won
2008	Europe/Africa Zone; Group III	Mindaugas Čeledinas, Laurynas Grigelis, Gvidas Sabeckis, Playing capitan: Daniel Lencina-Ribes	RR	9 May	Yerevan, Armenia	Clay	Bosnia and Herzegovina	2–1	Won
2008	Europe/Africa Zone; Group III	Mindaugas Čeledinas, Laurynas Grigelis, Gvidas Sabeckis, Playing capitan: Daniel Lencina-Ribes	PO	10 May	Yerevan, Armenia	Clay	Norway	2–1	Won
2008	Europe/Africa Zone; Group III	Mindaugas Čeledinas, Laurynas Grigelis, Gvidas Sabeckis, Playing capitan: Daniel Lencina-Ribes	PO	11 May	Yerevan, Armenia	Clay	Moldova	0–3	Lost
2009	Europe/Africa Zone; Group II	Ričardas Berankis, Vadim Pinko, Gvidas Sabeckis, Dovydas Šakinis, Team capitans: Daniel Lencina-Ribes, Remigijus Balžekas	1R	6–8 March	Vilnius, Lithuania	Hard (i)	Georgia	3–2	Won
2009	Europe/Africa Zone; Group II	Ričardas Berankis, Vadim Pinko, Gvidas Sabeckis, Dovydas Šakinis, Team capitans: Daniel Lencina-Ribes, Remigijus Balžekas	Q	10–12 July	Otočec, Slovenia	Clay	Slovenia	0–5	Lost

=== 2010–2019 ===
Year	Group	Team	Round	Date	Location	Surface	Opponent	Score	Outcome
2010	Europe/Africa Zone; Group II	Ričardas Berankis, Laurynas Grigelis, Lukas Mugevičius, Dovydas Šakinis, Team capitan: Remigijus Balžekas	1R	5–7 March	Vilnius, Lithuania	Hard (i)	Great Britain	3–2	Won
2010	Europe/Africa Zone; Group II	Ričardas Berankis, Laurynas Grigelis, Lukas Mugevičius, Dovydas Šakinis, Team capitan: Remigijus Balžekas	2R	9–11 July	Dublin, Ireland	Carpet (i)	Ireland	3–2	Won
2010	Europe/Africa Zone; Group II	Ričardas Berankis, Laurynas Grigelis, Lukas Mugevičius, Dovydas Šakinis, Team capitan: Remigijus Balžekas	Q	17–19 September	Vilnius, Lithuania	Hard (i)	Slovenia	3–2	Lost
2011	Europe/Africa Zone; Group II	Ričardas Berankis, Julius Gotovskis, Laurynas Grigelis, Lukas Mugevičius, Dovydas Šakinis, Julius Tverijonas, Team capitans: Remigijus Balžekas, Rimvydas Mugevičius	1R	4–6 March	Tallinn, Estonia	Hard (i)	Estonia	2–3	Lost
2011	Europe/Africa Zone; Group II	Ričardas Berankis, Julius Gotovskis, Laurynas Grigelis, Lukas Mugevičius, Dovydas Šakinis, Julius Tverijonas, Team capitans: Remigijus Balžekas, Rimvydas Mugevičius	PO	8–10 July	Vilnius, Lithuania	Clay	Morocco	0–5	Lost
2012	Europe Zone; Group III	Ričardas Berankis, Laurynas Grigelis, Lukas Mugevičius, Dovydas Šakinis, Team capitan: Rimvydas Mugevičius	RR	3 May	Sofia, Bulgaria	Clay	San Marino	3–0	Won
2012	Europe Zone; Group III	Ričardas Berankis, Laurynas Grigelis, Lukas Mugevičius, Dovydas Šakinis, Team capitan: Rimvydas Mugevičius	RR	4 May	Sofia, Bulgaria	Clay	Andorra	2–0	Won
2012	Europe Zone; Group III	Ričardas Berankis, Laurynas Grigelis, Lukas Mugevičius, Dovydas Šakinis, Team capitan: Rimvydas Mugevičius	PO	5 May	Sofia, Bulgaria	Clay	Greece	2–1	Won
2013	Europe/Africa Zone; Group II	Ričardas Berankis, Mantas Bugailiškis, Lukas Mugevičius, Dovydas Šakinis, Kasparas Žemaitėlis, Team capitan: Remigijus Balžekas, Rimvydas Mugevičius	1R	1–3 February	Šiauliai, Lithuania	Hard (i)	Cyprus	4–1	Won
2013	Europe/Africa Zone; Group II	Ričardas Berankis, Mantas Bugailiškis, Lukas Mugevičius, Dovydas Šakinis, Kasparas Žemaitėlis, Team capitan: Remigijus Balžekas, Rimvydas Mugevičius	2R	5–7 April	Lisbon, Portugal	Clay	Portugal	0–5	Lost
2014	Europe/Africa Zone; Group II		1R	31 January–2 February	Oslo, Norway	Hard (i)	Norway	5–0	Won
2014	Europe/Africa Zone; Group II		2R	4–6 April	Centurion, South Africa	Hard	South Africa	3–2	Won
2014	Europe/Africa Zone; Group II		3R	12–14 September	Sarajevo, Bosnia and Herzegovina	Hard (i)	Bosnia and Herzegovina	3–2	Won
2015	Europe/Africa Zone; Group I		1R	6–8 March	Płock, Poland	Hard (i)	Poland	2–3	Lost
2015	Europe/Africa Zone; Group I		1R play-offs	17–19 July	Vilnius, Lithuania	Hard (i)	Ukraine	1–4	Lost
2015	Europe/Africa Zone; Group I		2R play-offs	30 October–1 November	Kranj, Slovenia	Hard (i)	Slovenia	0–5	Lost
2016	Europe/Africa Zone; Group II		1R	4–6 March	Šiauliai, Lithuania	Hard (i)	Norway	3–2	Won
2016	Europe/Africa Zone; Group II		2R	15–17 July	Kaunas, Lithuania	Clay	South Africa	3–2	Won
2016	Europe/Africa Zone; Group II		3R	16–18 September	Vilnius, Lithuania	Hard (i)	Bosnia and Herzegovina	0–5	Lost
2017	Europe/Africa Zone; Group II		1R	3–5 February	Šiauliai, Lithuania	Hard (i)	Madagascar	3–2	Won
2017	Europe/Africa Zone; Group II		2R	7–9 April	Tbilisi, Georgia	Clay	Georgia	3–2	Won
2017	Europe/Africa Zone; Group II		3R	15–17 September	Bastad, Sweden	Clay	Sweden	0–5	Lost
2018	Europe/Africa Zone; Group II		1R	3–4 February	Šiauliai, Lithuania	Hard (i)	Estonia	3–1	Won
2018	Europe/Africa Zone; Group II		2R	7–8 April	Helsinki, Finland	Hard (i)	Finland	2–3	Lost
2019	Europe/Africa Zone; Group II		1R	5–6 April	Marrakesh, Morocco	Clay	Morocco	3–2	Won

=== 2020– ===
Year	Group	Team	Round	Date	Location	Surface	Opponent	Score	Outcome
2020	Davis Cup World Group I play-offs		PO	6–7 March	Šiauliai, Lithuania	Hard (i)	Portugal	0–4	Lost
2021	Davis Cup World Group II		PO	18–19 September	Heraklion, Greece	Hard	Greece	3–1	Won
2022	Davis Cup World Group I play-offs		PO	4–5 March	Islamabad, Pakistan	Grass	Pakistan	2–3	Lost
2022	Davis Cup World Group II		PO	17–18 September	Vilnius, Lithuania	Hard (i)	Egypt	4–1	Won
2023	Davis Cup World Group I play-offs		PO	3–4 February	Vilnius, Lithuania	Hard (i)	Pakistan	4–0	Won
2023	Davis Cup World Group I		PO	16–17 September	Buenos Aires, Argentina	Clay	Argentina	0–4	Lost
2024	Davis Cup World Group I play-offs		PO	3–4 February	Vilnius, Lithuania	Hard (i)	Georgia	3–2	Won
2024	Davis Cup World Group I		PO	13–14 September	Varaždin, Croatia	Hard (i)	Croatia	0–4	Lost
2025	Davis Cup World Group I play-offs		PO	1–2 February	Luxembourg City, Luxembourg	Hard (i)	Luxembourg	1–3	Lost
2025	Davis Cup World Group II		1R	13–14 September	Vilnius, Lithuania	Hard (i)	Benin	4–0	Won
2026	Davis Cup World Group I play-offs	Edas Butvilas, Vilius Gaubas, Pijus Vaitiekūnas, Team capitan: Rimvydas Mugevičius	PO	6–7 February	Netanya, Israel	Hard	Israel	3–1	Won
2026	Davis Cup World Group I	Edas Butvilas, Vilius Gaubas, Pijus Vaitiekūnas, Team capitan: Rimvydas Mugevičius	1R	18–20 September	Niš, Serbia	Hard (i)	Serbia	0–4	Lost
2027	Davis Cup World Group I play-offs		PO	6–8 February			Bolivia		

== See also ==
- Davis Cup
- Lithuania Billie Jean King Cup team
