= Johan Theron (tennis) =

Namibian tennis player

- Country (sports): Namibia
- Residence: Windhoek, Namibia
- Born: 9 September 1975 (age 49); Otjiwarongo, Namibia

Singles
- Highest ranking: No. 1,323 (8 October 2007)

Doubles
- Highest ranking: No. 1,474 (6 August 2001)

Johan Theron (9 September 1975) is a former Namibian tennis player who represented Namibia in the Davis Cup.

== Career ==
Theron was a member of Namibia's very first Davis Cup team in 2000. Namibia competed in the 2000 Davis Cup Europe/Africa Zone Group IV, against Zambia, Ethiopia and San Marino. Namibia won their group and was promoted to Group III for 2001. Theron won two of his three singles matches and both the doubles matches he played.

During his Davis Cup career from 2000 to 2007, Theron played thirty-one rubbers in twenty-five ties, winning five of his twenty-two singles and seven of his nine doubles rubbers. In 2012 he was appointed as the Namibian Davis Cup captain. He works as a tennis coach in Windhoek, Namibia.

== See also ==
- Namibian Davis Cup team representatives
