= Gvidas Sabeckis =

Lithuanian tennis player (born 1984)

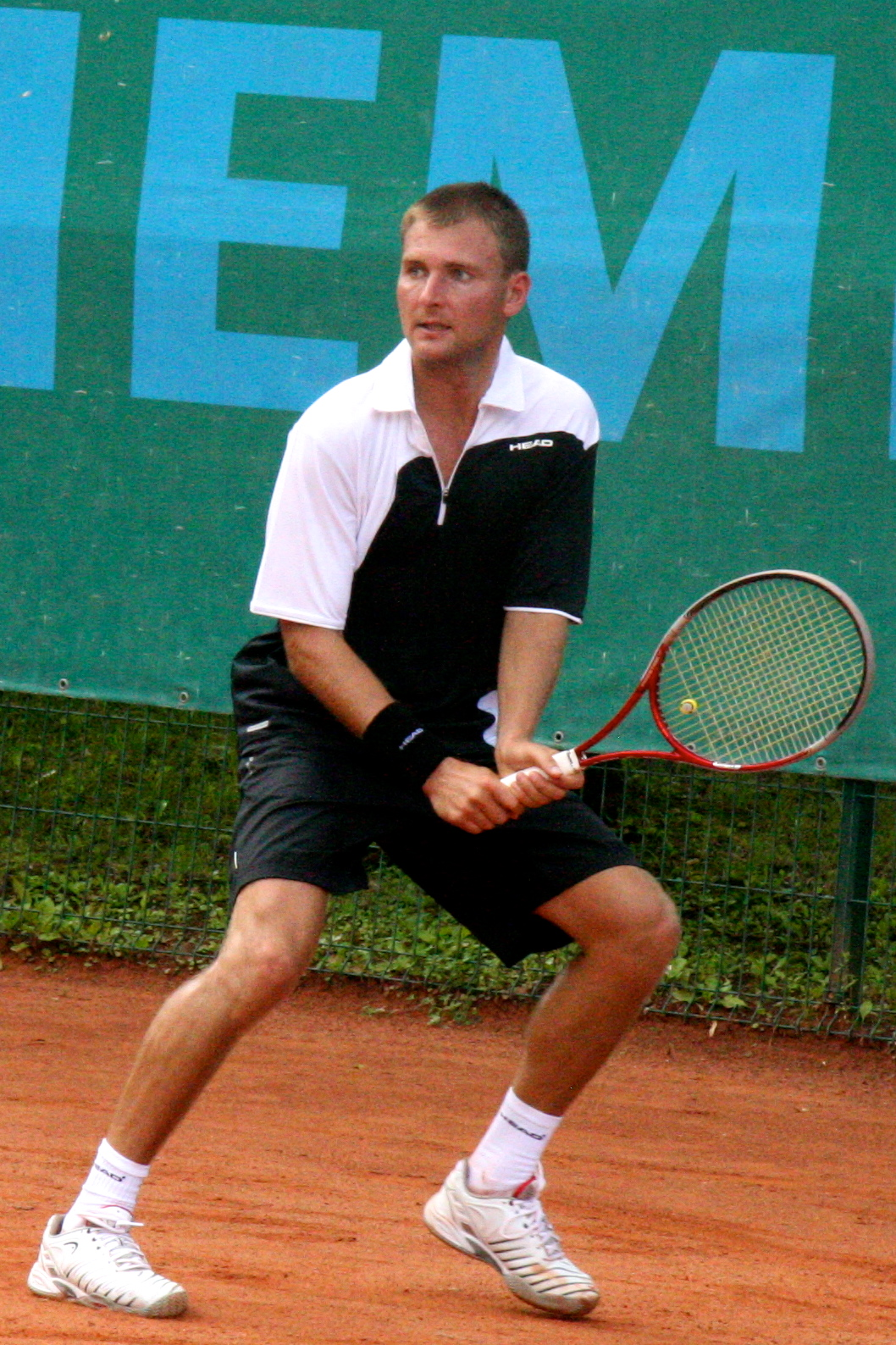
- Lithuanian President Cup 2012
- Country (sports): Lithuania
- Residence: Kaunas, Lithuania
- Born: March 27, 1984 (age 42) Prienai, Lithuanian SSR, Soviet Union
- Height: 1.81 m (5 ft 11 in)
- Retired: 2013 (last match)
- Plays: Right-handed (two-handed backhand)
- Prize money: $25,216

Singles
- Career record: 0–2
- Highest ranking: 488 (November 17, 2008)

Doubles
- Career record: 0–1
- Highest ranking: 548 (October 6, 2008)

Gvidas Sabeckis (born March 27, 1984) is a Lithuanian professional tennis player. He was number one Lithuanian in ATP ranking for 144 weeks and a member of Lithuania Davis Cup team for eight years.

== ITF Men's Circuit career finals ==
Legend / Singles / Doubles; Futures / 0–6 / 3–3	Surface / Singles / Doubles; Clay / 0–6 / 3–3

=== Singles ===
Outcome	Date	Tournament	Surface	Opponent	Score
Runner-up	August 6, 2006	Jūrmala, Latvia	Clay	(Latvia) Andis Juška	1–6, 2–6
Runner-up	August 12, 2007	Vilnius, Lithuania	Clay	(France) Nicolas Coutelot	4–6, 3–6
Runner-up	November 18, 2007	Kigali, Rwanda	Clay	(Netherlands) Matwé Middelkoop	5–7, 3–6
Runner-up	September 14, 2008	Bujumbura, Burundi	Clay	(Germany) Andre Begemann	6–7^{(2–7)}, 4–6
Runner-up	September 21, 2008	Kigali, Rwanda	Clay	(Germany) Andre Begemann	3–6, 0–6
Runner-up	September 28, 2008	Kampala, Uganda	Clay	(Germany) Andre Begemann	3–6, 7–6^{(7–2)}, 3–6

=== Doubles ===
Outcome	Date	Tournament	Surface	Partner	Opponents	Score
Runner-up	July 22, 2007	Târgu Mureș, Romania	Clay	(Serbia) Petar Popović	(Romania) Andrei Mlendea (Romania) Gabriel Moraru	3–6, 4–6
Winner	November 18, 2007	Kigali, Rwanda	Clay	(Netherlands) Matwé Middelkoop	(Nigeria) Candy Idoko (Nigeria) Lawal Shehu	7–6^{(9–7)}, 6–4
Winner	November 25, 2007	Kampala, Uganda	Clay	(Netherlands) Matwé Middelkoop	(Russia) Alexei Filenkov (Togo) Komlavi Loglo	6–1, 6–4
Runner-up	December 2, 2007	Khartoum, Sudan	Clay	(United Kingdom) David Brewer	(Slovakia) Martin Hromec (Slovakia) Alexander Somogyi	0–6, 4–6
Runner-up	May 18, 2008	Most, Czech Republic	Clay	(Germany) Martin Emmrich	(Czech Republic) Roman Jebavý (Czech Republic) Filip Zeman	5–7, 2–6
Winner	September 21, 2008	Kigali, Rwanda	Clay	(Romania) Bogdan Leonte	(Germany) Andre Begemann (Russia) Alexei Filenkov	7–6^{(7–2)}, 6–3

== Davis Cup ==
Sabeckis was a member of the Lithuania Davis Cup team, he has an 11–7 record in singles and a 12–14 record in doubles in 31 ties played. Also, he partnering Daniel Lencina-Ribes is the best doubles team that ever represented Lithuania, together they have a 6–4 record.
