= Lazar Magdinčev =

Macedonian tennis player (born 1980)

- Country (sports): North Macedonia
- Born: 15 December 1980 (age 44); Skopje, Macedonia, Yugoslavia
- Plays: Right-handed
- Prize money: $59,743

Singles
- Career record: 15–15 (Davis Cup)
- Highest ranking: No. 339 (28 November 2005)

Doubles
- Career record: 20–12 (Davis Cup)
- Highest ranking: No. 267 (6 August 2007)

Lazar Magdinčev (born 15 December 1980) is a Macedonian former professional tennis player.

Born in Skopje, Magdinčev reached a career best ranking of 339 for singles and 267 for doubles while competing on the professional tour. He won an ATP Challenger doubles title in Brașov in 2006.

Magdinčev played for the Macedonia Davis Cup team between 1996 and 1998, then again from 2004 to 2011. He had victories against Gilles Müller and Ernests Gulbis, amongst his 15 singles wins. In doubles he won a total of 20 rubbers, which included 14 partnering Predrag Rusevski, making them Macedonia's most successful doubles pair.

== Challenger titles ==
=== Doubles: (1) ===
No.	Date	Tournament	Surface	Partner	Opponents	Score
1.	September 2006	Brașov, Romania	Clay	(North Macedonia) Predrag Rusevski	(Netherlands) Robin Haase (Czech Republic) Michal Navrátil	6–4, 7–6^{(9)}
