= Rolandas Muraška =

Lithuanian tennis player (born 1973)

- Country (sports): Lithuania
- Residence: Vilnius, Lithuania
- Born: March 13, 1973 (age 52); Klaipėda, Lithuanian SSR, Soviet Union
- Retired: 2005
- Plays: Right-handed
- Prize money: $8,254

Singles
- Career record: 0–0
- Career titles: 0 Futures: 5
- Highest ranking: No. 575 (August 13, 2001)

Doubles
- Career record: 0–0
- Career titles: 0 Futures: 1
- Highest ranking: No. 1100 (July 10, 2006)

Rolandas Muraška (born March 13, 1973) is a retired Lithuanian professional tennis player and a former member of Lithuania Davis Cup team. He was the first Lithuanian who got ranked by ATP (July 26, 1993) and he was also the highest ranked Lithuanian for 259 weeks in total.

== Career finals ==
Legend	Singles	Doubles
Futures	5–1	1–1

Surface	Singles	Doubles
Clay	1–1	1–1
Grass	4–0	0–0

=== Singles ===
Outcome	Date	Tournament	Surface	Opponent	Score
Winner	August 20, 2000	Vilnius, Lithuania	Grass	(Slovenia) Marko Tkalec	6–1, 6–4
Winner	August 5, 2001	Pärnu, Estonia	Clay	(Poland) Filip Aniola	6–1, 6–5 ret.
Runner-up	August 15, 2004	Vilnius, Lithuania	Clay	(Spain) Javier García-Sintes	3–6, 6–3, 1–6

=== Doubles ===
Outcome	Date	Tournament	Surface	Partner	Opponents	Score
Runner-up	August 4, 2002	Pärnu, Estonia	Clay	(Lithuania) Daniel Lencina-Ribes	(Estonia) Mait Künnap (Finland) Tapio Nurminen	1–6, 4–6
Winner	August 21, 2005	Vilnius, Lithuania	Clay	(Israel) Dekel Valtzer	(Sweden) Johan Brunström (Finland) Lauri Kiiski	6–3, 2–6, 6–3

== Davis Cup ==
Muraška holds the record of being a member of Lithuania Davis Cup team for the longest time period – 12 years – from the debut of Lithuania in Davis Cup competition in 1994 until his retirement in 2005. Also, he played most ties representing Lithuania (49) and he won the most singles (37) and the most doubles (19) matches in the history of Lithuanian team.
