= Rareș Cuzdriorean =

Romanian-Cypriot tennis player (born 1986)

- Country (sports): Cyprus
- Residence: Limassol, Cyprus; Satu Mare, Romania
- Born: 31 July 1986 (age 38); Satu Mare, Romania
- Height: 1.85 m (6 ft 1 in)
- Turned pro: 2004
- Plays: Right-handed (two-handed backhand)

Singles
- Career record: 0–5 (in ATP World Tour and Grand Slam main draw matches, and in Davis Cup)
- Highest ranking: No. 1502 (17 August 2009)

Doubles
- Career record: 4–4 (in ATP World Tour and Grand Slam main draw matches, and in Davis Cup)
- Last updated on: 20 April 2015.

Rareș Cuzdriorean (Greek: Ράρες Κουζδριόρεαν, born 31 July 1986) is a Romanian professional tennis player with Cypriot citizenship. He qualified to play for the Cyprus Davis Cup team after defeating fellow Cypriot Christopher Koutrouzas 6–1, 6–4 in a playoff tournament held in Limassol.
