= Daniel Lencina-Ribes =

Spanish tennis player (born 1977)

- Country (sports): Lithuania
- Residence: Germany
- Born: 5 February 1977 (age 48); Spain
- Retired: 2009
- Plays: Right-handed
- Prize money: $23,814

Singles
- Career record: 0–0
- Highest ranking: 591 (27 August 2001)

Doubles
- Career record: 0–1
- Highest ranking: 671 (15 September 2003)

Daniel Lencina-Ribes (born 5 February 1977) is a retired professional tennis player who is born in Alicante, Spain. He got by presidential decree, from president Paksas, the Lithuanian nationality and represented Lithuania at international tennis tournaments. He was number one from Lithuania in the ATP ranking for 322 weeks and a member of Lithuania Davis Cup team for five years. At the moment he is married and lives in Germany where after being the director of the Lencina tennis school, he is working as a clinical psychologist in a psychiatric hospital.

== ITF Men's Circuit career finals ==
Legend / Singles / Doubles; Futures / 0–0 / 1–2	Surface / Singles / Doubles; Clay / 0–0 / 1–2

=== Doubles ===
Outcome	Date	Tournament	Surface	Partner	Opponents	Score
Runner-up	25 June 2000	Zabrze, Poland	Clay	(Spain) David Ferrer	(Poland) Piotr Szczepanik (Ukraine) Orest Tereshchuk	4–6, 0–6
Runner-up	4 August 2002	Pärnu, Estonia	Clay	(Lithuania) Rolandas Muraška	(Estonia) Mait Künnap (Finland) Tapio Nurminen	1–6, 4–6
Winner	24 August 2003	Šiauliai, Lithuania	Clay	(Finland) Tommi Lenho	(Norway) Stian Boretti (Italy) Federico Torresi	7–6^{(7–1)}, 3–6, 6–3

== Davis Cup ==
He was a member of the Lithuania Davis Cup team, he has an 11–4 record in singles and an 8–5 record in doubles in 20 ties played. Also, he was partnering Rolandas Muraška and Gvidas Sabeckis, making with the last one of the best doubles team that ever represented Lithuania, together they have a 6–4 record.
