= Italy Davis Cup team results (2000–present) =

The following article details all results for the Italy Davis Cup team in the period between 2000 and present. They played a total of 70 Davis Cup ties.

In this period Italy won the Davis Cup on three consecutive occasions in 2023, 2024 and 2025, made the semifinals twice in 2024 and 2022, and the quarterfinals on five occasions in 2013, 2016, 2017, 2018 and 2021.

Italy was relegated from the World Group in 2000, spending the next 11 years in Group I (except one year in Group II in 2004) until earning promotion back to the World Group via the 2011 playoff. Italy maintained World Group status for all seven remaining years until the establishment of the Davis Cup Finals in 2019. They have made the Final 8 in every edition (five) since 2020–21 Davis Cup.

== 2000s ==
=== 2000 ===
2000 Davis Cup World Group First round

Spain
4
Murcia Tennis Club, Murcia, Spain
4–6 February 2000
Clay

Italy
1

			1	2	3	4	5
1	(Spain) (Italy)	Albert Costa; Davide Sanguinetti	6; 4	6; 4	6; 2
2	(Spain) (Italy)	Àlex Corretja; Andrea Gaudenzi	4; 6	6; 1	6; 1	6; 1
3	(Spain) (Italy)	Joan Balcells / Àlex Corretja; Andrea Gaudenzi / Diego Nargiso	6; 3	6; 4	6; 1
4	(Spain) (Italy)	Albert Costa; Andrea Gaudenzi	7; 5	5; 7	4; 6
5	(Spain) (Italy)	Francisco Clavet; Vincenzo Santopadre	6^{5} 7^{7}	6; 1	6; 3

2000 Davis Cup World Group qualifying round

Italy
1
Green Garden Sporting Club, Venice, Italy
21–23 July 2000
Clay

Belgium
4

			1	2	3	4	5
1	(Italy) (Belgium)	Andrea Gaudenzi; Olivier Rochus	2; 6	5; 7	3; 6
2	(Italy) (Belgium)	Davide Sanguinetti; Filip Dewulf	1; 6	7^{7} 6^{5}	7; 5	6; 0
3	(Italy) (Belgium)	Andrea Gaudenzi / Diego Nargiso; Christophe Rochus / Tom Vanhoudt	4; 6	4; 6	4; 6
4	(Italy) (Belgium)	Davide Sanguinetti; Christophe Rochus	2; 6	5; 7	7^{8} 6^{6}	6; 1	5; 7
5	(Italy) (Belgium)	Renzo Furlan; Filip Dewulf	5; 7	2; 6

- Italy relegated to Group I for 2000

=== 2001 ===
2001 Davis Cup EU/AF Zone GI Second round

Finland
2
Tali Tennis Centre, Helsinki, Finland
6–8 April 2001
Carpet (indoors)

Italy
3

			1	2	3	4	5
1	(Finland) (Italy)	Ville Liukko; Federico Luzzi	4; 6	6^{7} 7^{9}	6; 4	6; 3	12; 14
2	(Finland) (Italy)	Jarkko Nieminen; Mosé Navarra	6; 3	6^{1} 7^{7}	2; 6	4; 6
3	(Finland) (Italy)	Tuomas Ketola / Jarkko Nieminen; Mosé Navarra / Vincenzo Santopadre	5; 7	5; 7	4; 6
4	(Finland) (Italy)	Jarkko Nieminen; Filippo Volandri	6; 3	7; 5
5	(Finland) (Italy)	Tapio Nurminen; Vincenzo Santopadre	6; 3	6; 4

2001 Davis Cup World Group qualifying round

Italy
2
Foro Italico, Rome, Italy
21–23 September 2001
Clay

Croatia
3

			1	2	3	4	5
1	(Italy) (Croatia)	Filippo Volandri; Goran Ivanišević	6; 2	7^{7} 6^{4}	3; 6	0; 6	6; 4
2	(Italy) (Croatia)	Federico Luzzi; Ivan Ljubičić	4; 6	2; 6	1; 6
3	(Italy) (Croatia)	Giorgio Galimberti / Mosé Navarra; Goran Ivanišević / Ivan Ljubičić	7^{8} 6^{6}	6; 3	6^{5} 7^{7}	2; 6	4; 6
4	(Italy) (Croatia)	Federico Luzzi; Goran Ivanišević	6^{4} 7^{7}	3; 6	4; 6
5	(Italy) (Croatia)	Filippo Volandri; Ivan Vajda	6; 2	6; 4

=== 2002 ===
2002 Davis Cup EU/AF Zone GI Second Round

Italy
1
Rocco Polimeni TC, Reggio Calabria, Italy
5–7 April 2002
Clay

Finland
4

			1	2	3	4	5
1	(Italy) (Finland)	Davide Sanguinetti; Kim Tiilikainen	6; 2	7; 5	3; 6	2; 6	5; 7
2	(Italy) (Finland)	Giorgio Galimberti; Jarkko Nieminen	3; 6	2; 6	2; 6
3	(Italy) (Finland)	Giorgio Galimberti / Mosé Navarra; Lauri Kiiski / Jarkko Nieminen	3; 6	6^{10} 7^{12}	3; 6
4	(Italy) (Finland)	Mosé Navarra; Timo Nieminen	6; 3	7; 5
5	(Italy) (Finland)	Stefano Galvani; Kim Tiilikainen	3; 6	1; 6

2002 Davis Cup EU/AF Zone GI Second round play-offs

Italy
4
Follonica T.C., Follonica, Italy
20–22 September 2002
Carpet (indoors)

Portugal
1

			1	2	3	4	5
1	(Italy) (Portugal)	Stefano Galvani; Bernardo Mota	5; 7	3; 6	6^{2} 7^{7}
2	(Italy) (Portugal)	Davide Sanguinetti; Leonardo Tavares	6; 3	6; 2	6; 1
3	(Italy) (Portugal)	Massimo Bertolini / Giorgio Galimberti; Hélder Lopes / Bernardo Mota	6; 3	6^{4} 7^{7}	6; 3	6; 4
4	(Italy) (Portugal)	Davide Sanguinetti; Bernardo Mota	6; 4	7; 5	6; 4
5	(Italy) (Portugal)	Stefano Galvani; Tiago Godinho	6; 4	6; 1

=== 2003 ===
2003 Davis Cup EU/AF Zone GI Second Round

Morocco
3
Royal Tennis Club, Marrakesh, Morocco
4–6 April 2003
Clay

Italy
2

			1	2	3	4	5
1	(Morocco) (Italy)	Younes El Aynaoui; Filippo Volandri	7^{8} 6^{6}	6; 4	3; 6	7^{7} 6^{5}
2	(Morocco) (Italy)	Hicham Arazi; Davide Sanguinetti	5; 7	6; 1	6; 0	4; 6	3; 6
3	(Morocco) (Italy)	Mounir El Aarej / Younes El Aynaoui; Massimo Bertolini / Giorgio Galimberti	1; 6	4; 6	1; 6
4	(Morocco) (Italy)	Younes El Aynaoui; Davide Sanguinetti	6; 4	6; 3	6; 2
5	(Morocco) (Italy)	Hicham Arazi; Filippo Volandri	6; 3	6; 3	6; 2

2003 Davis Cup EU/AF Zone GI Second round play-offs

Zimbabwe
3
Harare City Sports Centre, Harare, Zimbabwe
19–21 September 2003
Hard

Italy
2

			1	2	3	4	5
1	(Zimbabwe) (Italy)	Kevin Ullyett; Filippo Volandri	4; 6	7; 5	6; 3	7^{7} 6^{5}
2	(Zimbabwe) (Italy)	Wayne Black; Davide Sanguinetti	7^{7} 6^{2}	6; 1	6; 3
3	(Zimbabwe) (Italy)	Wayne Black / Kevin Ullyett; Massimo Bertolini / Giorgio Galimberti	7^{9} 6^{7}	6; 2	6; 4
4	(Zimbabwe) (Italy)	Genius Chidzikwe; Giorgio Galimberti	2; 6	2; 6
5	(Zimbabwe) (Italy)	Nigel Badza; Davide Sanguinetti	1; 6	1; 6

- Italy relegated to Group II for 2004

=== 2004 ===
2004 Davis Cup EU/AF Zone GII First round

Italy
3
Tennis Club Cagliari, Cagliari, Italy
9–11 April 2004
Clay

Georgia
2

			1	2	3	4	5
1	(Italy) (Georgia (country))	Alessio Di Mauro; Irakli Ushangishvili	6; 1	6; 0	6; 2
2	(Italy) (Georgia (country))	Andreas Seppi; Irakli Labadze	4; 6	5; 7	6; 1	6; 2	2; 6
3	(Italy) (Georgia (country))	Massimo Bertolini / Giorgio Galimberti; Lado Chikhladze / Irakli Labadze	7^{7} 6^{5}	7; 5	6; 4
4	(Italy) (Georgia (country))	Giorgio Galimberti; Irakli Labadze	1; 6	2; 6	7; 5	3; 6
5	(Italy) (Georgia (country))	Andreas Seppi; Lado Chikhladze	6; 2	6; 4	6; 4

2004 Davis Cup EU/AF Zone GII Second round

Italy
5
Circolo Tennis Teramo, Teramo, Italy
16–18 July 2004
Clay

Bulgaria
0

			1	2	3	4	5
1	(Italy) (Bulgaria)	Filippo Volandri; Ivaylo Traykov	6; 4	6; 2	6; 4
2	(Italy) (Bulgaria)	Potito Starace; Todor Enev	6; 1	6; 2	6; 3
3	(Italy) (Bulgaria)	Massimo Bertolini / Andreas Seppi; Yordan Kanev / Ilia Kushev	6; 4	6; 0	6; 1
4	(Italy) (Bulgaria)	Filippo Volandri; Ilia Kushev	6; 2	6; 0
5	(Italy) (Bulgaria)	Andreas Seppi; Yordan Kanev	6; 2	7; 5

2004 Davis Cup EU/AF Zone GII Third round

Italy
3
Tennis Club Livorno, Livorno, Italy
24–26 September 2004
Clay

Poland
2

			1	2	3	4	5
1	(Italy) (Poland)	Filippo Volandri; Michal Przysiezny	6; 1	6; 2	6; 1
2	(Italy) (Poland)	Potito Starace; Lukasz Kubot	6; 4	6; 3	6; 4
3	(Italy) (Poland)	Massimo Bertolini / Andreas Seppi; Mariusz Fyrstenberg / Marcin Matkowski	3; 6	6; 2	4; 6	4; 6
4	(Italy) (Poland)	Filippo Volandri; Lukasz Kubot	6; 3	4; 6	1; 6	7^{7} 6^{4}	2; 6
5	(Italy) (Poland)	Potito Starace; Mariusz Fyrstenberg	2; 6	6; 3	4; 6	6; 3	7; 5

- Italy promoted to Europe/Africa Group I for 2005.

=== 2005 ===
2005 Davis Cup EU/AF Zone GI First round

Italy
5
Centre National Sportif et Culturel D'Coque, Luxembourg City, Luxembourg
4–6 March 2005
Hard (indoor)

Luxembourg
0

			1	2	3	4	5
1	(Italy) (Luxembourg)	Daniele Bracciali; Gilles Müller	7^{7} 6^{4}	6^{4} 7^{7}	6; 4	6; 4
2	(Italy) (Luxembourg)	Potito Starace; Mike Scheidweiler	6; 3	6; 1	6; 2
3	(Italy) (Luxembourg)	Daniele Bracciali / Giorgio Galimberti; Gilles Müller / Mike Scheidweiler	6; 4	6; 4	6^{6} 7^{8}	7; 5
4	(Italy) (Luxembourg)	Potito Starace; Gilles Kremer	6; 4	6; 2
5	(Italy) (Luxembourg)	Andreas Seppi; Laurent Bram	7^{7} 6^{4}	6; 3

2005 Davis Cup EU/AF Zone GI Second round

Italy
4
Foro Italico, Rome, Italy
28–30 April 2005
Clay

Morocco
1

			1	2	3	4	5
1	(Italy) (Morocco)	Potito Starace; Mounir El Aarej	6; 0	3; 6	7; 5	6; 0
2	(Italy) (Morocco)	Filippo Volandri; Younes El Aynaoui	6; 2	6; 4	6; 1
3	(Italy) (Morocco)	Daniele Bracciali / Giorgio Galimberti; Younes El Aynaoui / Mehdi Tahiri	7; 5	6; 1	6; 2
4	(Italy) (Morocco)	Filippo Volandri; Mounir El Aarej	3; 6	6; 1	1; 6
5	(Italy) (Morocco)	Potito Starace; Mehdi Tahiri	6; 1	3; 6	6; 4

2005 Davis Cup World Group play-offs

Italy
2
Sporting Club Oplonti, Torre del Greco, Italy
23–25 September 2005
Clay

Spain
3

			1	2	3	4	5
1	(Italy) (Spain)	Andreas Seppi; Juan Carlos Ferrero	5; 7	3; 6	6; 0	6; 3	6; 2
2	(Italy) (Spain)	Daniele Bracciali; Rafael Nadal	3; 6	2; 6	1; 6
3	(Italy) (Spain)	Daniele Bracciali / Giorgio Galimberti; Rafael Nadal / Feliciano López	4; 6	6; 4	6; 2	4; 6	9; 7
4	(Italy) (Spain)	Andreas Seppi; Rafael Nadal	1; 6	2; 6	7; 5	4; 6
5	(Italy) (Spain)	Daniele Bracciali; Juan Carlos Ferrero	3; 6	0; 6	3; 6

=== 2006 ===
2006 Davis Cup EU/AF Zone GI Second round

Italy
5
Sporting Club Oplonti, Torre del Greco, Italy
7–9 April 2006
Clay

Luxembourg
0

			1	2	3	4	5
1	(Italy) (Luxembourg)	Filippo Volandri; Gilles Kremer	6; 2	6; 1	6; 2
2	(Italy) (Luxembourg)	Andreas Seppi; Laurent Bram	6; 2	6; 1	6; 3
3	(Italy) (Luxembourg)	Daniele Bracciali / Giorgio Galimberti; Laurent Bram / Gilles Kremer	6; 3	6; 2	6; 4
4	(Italy) (Luxembourg)	Filippo Volandri; Laurent Bram	6; 3	6; 1
5	(Italy) (Luxembourg)	Giorgio Galimberti; Gilles Kremer	6; 1	6; 3

2006 Davis Cup World Group play-offs

Spain
4
Real Sociedad de Tenis de La Magdalena, Santander, Spain
22–24 September 2006
Clay

Italy
1

			1	2	3	4	5
1	(Spain) (Italy)	Tommy Robredo; Filippo Volandri	3; 6	5; 7	3; 6
2	(Spain) (Italy)	Rafael Nadal; Andreas Seppi	6; 0	6; 4	6; 3
3	(Spain) (Italy)	Rafael Nadal / Fernando Verdasco; Daniele Bracciali / Giorgio Galimberti	6; 2	3; 6	6; 3	7^{7} 6^{4}
4	(Spain) (Italy)	Rafael Nadal; Filippo Volandri	3; 6	7; 5	6; 3	6; 3
5	(Spain) (Italy)	David Ferrer; Andreas Seppi	6; 2	6; 2

=== 2007 ===
2007 Davis Cup EU/AF Zone GI Second round

Israel
3
Canada Stadium, Ramat HaSharon, Israel
6–8 April 2007
Hard

Italy
2

			1	2	3	4	5
1	(Israel) (Italy)	Dudi Sela; Andreas Seppi	6; 3	7; 5	1; 6	3; 6	6; 3
2	(Israel) (Italy)	Noam Okun; Simone Bolelli	7; 5	7; 5	6; 4
3	(Israel) (Italy)	Jonathan Erlich / Andy Ram; Daniele Bracciali / Potito Starace	6; 3	7^{7} 6^{4}	7^{7} 6^{5}
4	(Israel) (Italy)	Noam Okun; Andreas Seppi	6^{4} 7^{7}	6^{1} 7^{7}
5	(Israel) (Italy)	Dudi Sela; Simone Bolelli	5; 7	3; 6

2007 Davis Cup EU/AF Zone GI First round play-offs

Italy
4
Tennis Club Alghero, Alghero, Italy
20–22 July 2007
Hard

Luxembourg
1

			1	2	3	4	5
1	(Italy) (Luxembourg)	Potito Starace; Laurent Bram	6; 1	6; 3	6; 4
2	(Italy) (Luxembourg)	Andreas Seppi; Gilles Müller	6; 1	6; 1	6; 4
3	(Italy) (Luxembourg)	Daniele Bracciali / Potito Starace; Gilles Müller / Mike Scheidweiler	3; 6	6; 1	4; 6	6; 4	6; 3
4	(Italy) (Luxembourg)	Daniele Bracciali; Gilles Kremer	3; 6					retired
5	(Italy) (Luxembourg)	Federico Luzzi; Laurent Bram	6; 4	6; 4

=== 2008 ===
2008 Davis Cup EU/AF Zone GI Second round

Croatia
3
Sportska Dvorana, Dubrovnik, Croatia
11–13 April 2008
hard (indoor)

Italy
2

			1	2	3	4	5
1	(Croatia) (Italy)	Ivo Karlović; Simone Bolelli	6^{7} 7^{9}	3; 6	4; 6
2	(Croatia) (Italy)	Mario Ančić; Andreas Seppi	6; 2	6; 4	7; 5
3	(Croatia) (Italy)	Mario Ančić / Marin Čilić; Simone Bolelli / Potito Starace	7^{7} 6^{3}	6; 4	1; 6	6; 3
4	(Croatia) (Italy)	Marin Čilić; Andreas Seppi	7^{9} 6^{7}	4; 6	4; 6	7^{7} 6^{3}	1; 6
5	(Croatia) (Italy)	Mario Ančić; Simone Bolelli	6; 4	6; 4	6; 2

2008 Davis Cup EU/AF Zone GI Second round play-offs

Italy
3
Sporting Club Montecatini, Montecatini, Italy
19–21 September 2008
clay (outdoor)

Latvia
2

			1	2	3	4	5
1	(Italy) (Latvia)	Fabio Fognini; Ernests Gulbis	6^{2} 7^{7}	1; 6	1; 6
2	(Italy) (Latvia)	Andreas Seppi; Andis Juška	6; 4	6; 2	7^{7} 6^{5}
3	(Italy) (Latvia)	Andreas Seppi / Potito Starace; Ernests Gulbis / Andis Juška	3; 6	6; 3	6; 2	6; 4
4	(Italy) (Latvia)	Andreas Seppi; Ernests Gulbis	6; 3	7; 5	3; 6	6^{3} 7^{7}	3; 6
5	(Italy) (Latvia)	Potito Starace; Andis Juška	6; 3	6; 4	7^{7} 6^{3}

=== 2009 ===
2009 Davis Cup EU/AF Zone GI Second round

Slovakia
1
Tennis Club Cagliari, Cagliari, Italy
6–8 March 2009
clay (outdoor)

Italy
4

			1	2	3	4	5
1	(Slovakia) (Italy)	Dominik Hrbatý; Potito Starace	1; 6	2; 6	4; 6
2	(Slovakia) (Italy)	Lukáš Lacko; Fabio Fognini	6; 1	3; 6	2; 6	6; 1	1; 6
3	(Slovakia) (Italy)	Michal Mertiňák / Filip Polášek; Flavio Cipolla / Potito Starace	7; 5	4; 6	6; 0	2; 6	9; 7
4	(Slovakia) (Italy)	Dominik Hrbatý; Fabio Fognini	6^{1} 7^{7}	1; 6	3; 6
5	(Slovakia) (Italy)	Lukáš Lacko; Flavio Cipolla	2; 6	5; 7

2009 Davis Cup World Group play-offs

Italy
2
Valletta Cambiaso Club, Genova, Italy
18–20 September 2009
Clay

Switzerland
3

			1	2	3	4	5
1	(Italy) (Switzerland)	Andreas Seppi; Stanislas Wawrinka	4; 6	1; 6	2; 6
2	(Italy) (Switzerland)	Simone Bolelli; Roger Federer	3; 6	4; 6	1; 6
3	(Italy) (Switzerland)	Simone Bolelli / Potito Starace; Marco Chiudinelli / Stanislas Wawrinka	6; 2	6; 4	7^{7} 6^{3}
4	(Italy) (Switzerland)	Potito Starace; Roger Federer	3; 6	0; 6	4; 6
5	(Italy) (Switzerland)	Fabio Fognini; Michael Lammer	7; 5	7^{7} 6^{4}

== 2010s ==
=== 2010 ===
2010 Davis Cup EU/AF Zone GI First Round

Italy
5
Nova Yardinia, Castellaneta Marina, Italy
5–7 March 2010
clay (outdoor)

Belarus
0

			1	2	3	4	5
1	(Italy) (Belarus)	Potito Starace; Uladzimir Ignatik	6; 4	6; 1	6; 2
2	(Italy) (Belarus)	Fabio Fognini; Alexander Bury	6; 2	6; 4	6; 1
3	(Italy) (Belarus)	Simone Bolelli / Filippo Volandri; Uladzimir Ignatik / Max Mirnyi	6; 1	6; 4	6; 2
4	(Italy) (Belarus)	Simone Bolelli; Uladzimir Ignatik	6; 3	6; 3
5	(Italy) (Belarus)	Filippo Volandri; Andrei Vasilevski	7^{7} 6^{3}	6; 3

2010 Davis Cup EU/AF Zone GI Second Round

Netherlands
1
PWA Silverdome, Zoetermeer, Netherlands
7 – 9 May
Hard – Indoors

Italy
4

			1	2	3	4	5
1	(Netherlands) (Italy)	Thiemo de Bakker; Simone Bolelli	6^{5} 7^{7}	6^{5} 7^{7}	3; 6
2	(Netherlands) (Italy)	Robin Haase; Potito Starace	5; 7	3; 6	6; 2	6^{2} 7^{7}
3	(Netherlands) (Italy)	Robin Haase / Igor Sijsling; Simone Bolelli / Potito Starace	6; 4	3; 6	6^{5} 7^{7}	4; 6
4	(Netherlands) (Italy)	Igor Sijsling; Paolo Lorenzi	4; 6	3; 6
5	(Netherlands) (Italy)	Robin Haase; Daniele Bracciali	7^{9} 6^{7}	7; 5

2010 Davis Cup World Group play-offs

Sweden
3
Sparbanken Lidköping Arena, Lidköping, Sweden
17–19 September 2010
Hard (i)

Italy
2

			1	2	3	4	5
1	(Sweden) (Italy)	Andreas Vinciguerra; Potito Starace	2; 6	2; 6	2; 6
2	(Sweden) (Italy)	Robin Söderling; Fabio Fognini	6; 1	6; 3	6; 2
3	(Sweden) (Italy)	Simon Aspelin / Robert Lindstedt; Simone Bolelli / Potito Starace	5; 7	6^{0} 7^{7}	7^{7} 6^{4}	6; 3	7; 5
4	(Sweden) (Italy)	Robin Söderling; Simone Bolelli	6; 3	6; 3	6; 3
5	(Sweden) (Italy)	Andreas Vinciguerra; Fabio Fognini	1; 6	3; 6

=== 2011 ===
2011 Davis Cup EU/AF Zone GI Second Round

Italy
5
Circolo Tennistico Corracilvuna, Arzachena, Italy
8–10 July 2011
clay (outdoor)

Slovenia
0

			1	2	3	4	5
1	(Italy) (Slovenia)	Fabio Fognini; Grega Žemlja	1; 6	6; 4	6; 4	6; 4
2	(Italy) (Slovenia)	Potito Starace; Blaž Kavčič	3; 6	6; 3	6; 2	6; 4
3	(Italy) (Slovenia)	Daniele Bracciali / Potito Starace; Blaž Kavčič / Grega Žemlja	7^{7} 6^{3}	7^{7} 6^{4}	6; 2
4	(Italy) (Slovenia)	Fabio Fognini; Aljaž Bedene	6; 2	2; 2				retired
5	(Italy) (Slovenia)	Simone Bolelli; Grega Žemlja	7; 5	6; 3

2011 Davis Cup World Group play-offs

Chile
1
Estadio Nacional, Santiago, Chile
16–18 September 2011
Hard

Italy
4

			1	2	3	4	5
1	(Chile) (Italy)	Paul Capdeville; Potito Starace	3; 6	3; 6	6; 2	6^{5} 7^{7}
2	(Chile) (Italy)	Fernando González; Fabio Fognini	2; 6	6; 4	1; 2			retired
3	(Chile) (Italy)	Jorge Aguilar / Nicolás Massú; Simone Bolelli / Fabio Fognini	4; 6	4; 6	4; 6
4	(Chile) (Italy)	Paul Capdeville; Simone Bolelli	7^{7} 6^{3}	6; 2
5	(Chile) (Italy)	Nicolás Massú; Daniele Bracciali	3; 4					retired

=== 2012 ===
2012 Davis Cup World Group First Round

Czech Republic
4
ČEZ Aréna, Ostrava, Czech Republic
10–12 February 2012
Hard (i)

Italy
1

			1	2	3	4	5
1	(Czech Republic) (Italy)	Radek Štěpánek; Andreas Seppi	4; 6	6; 4	6; 3	3; 6	6; 3
2	(Czech Republic) (Italy)	Tomáš Berdych; Simone Bolelli	6; 3	4; 6	7; 5	6; 2
3	(Czech Republic) (Italy)	Tomáš Berdych / Radek Štěpánek; Daniele Bracciali / Potito Starace	6; 3	6; 4	6; 2
4	(Czech Republic) (Italy)	Lukáš Rosol; Andreas Seppi	4; 6	6; 3	6; 4
5	(Czech Republic) (Italy)	František Čermák; Simone Bolelli	4; 6	4; 6

2012 Davis Cup World Group play-offs

Italy
4
Tennis Club Napoli, Naples, Italy
14–16 September 2012
Clay

Chile
1

			1	2	3	4	5
1	(Italy) (Chile)	Andreas Seppi; Guillermo Hormazábal	7; 5	6; 1	6; 2
2	(Italy) (Chile)	Fabio Fognini; Paul Capdeville	2; 6	6; 2	6^{6} 7^{8}	6; 1	6; 2
3	(Italy) (Chile)	Daniele Bracciali / Andreas Seppi; Jorge Aguilar / Paul Capdeville	4; 6	6; 4	4; 6	2; 6
4	(Italy) (Chile)	Andreas Seppi; Paul Capdeville	6; 3	6; 1	6; 3
5	(Italy) (Chile)	Simone Bolelli; Christian Garín	6; 4	6; 3

=== 2013 ===
2013 Davis Cup World Group First Round

Italy
3
Palavela, Turin, Italy
1–3 February 2013
Clay (i)

Croatia
2

			1	2	3	4	5
1	(Italy) (Croatia)	Paolo Lorenzi; Marin Čilić	1; 6	7^{8} 6^{6}	6; 4	3; 6	2; 6
2	(Italy) (Croatia)	Andreas Seppi; Ivan Dodig	6; 2	6^{2} 7^{7}	6; 4	6; 4
3	(Italy) (Croatia)	Simone Bolelli / Fabio Fognini; Marin Čilić / Ivan Dodig	3; 6	6; 1	6; 3	7^{13} 6^{11}
4	(Italy) (Croatia)	Andreas Seppi; Marin Čilić	3; 6	3; 6	5; 7
5	(Italy) (Croatia)	Fabio Fognini; Ivan Dodig	4; 6	6; 4	6; 4	6; 4

2013 Davis Cup World Group Quarterfinals

Canada
3
Doug Mitchell Thunderbird Sports Centre, Vancouver, Canada
5–7 April 2013
Hard (i)

Italy
1

			1	2	3	4	5
1	(Canada) (Italy)	Vasek Pospisil; Andreas Seppi	7; 5	6; 4	4; 6	3; 6	3; 6
2	(Canada) (Italy)	Milos Raonic; Fabio Fognini	6; 4	7^{7} 6^{4}	7; 5
3	(Canada) (Italy)	Daniel Nestor / Vasek Pospisil; Daniele Bracciali / Fabio Fognini	6; 3	6; 4	3; 6	3; 6	15; 13
4	(Canada) (Italy)	Milos Raonic; Andreas Seppi	6; 4	6; 4	3; 6	7; 5
5	(Canada) (Italy)	Vasek Pospisil; Fabio Fognini						not played

=== 2014 ===
2014 Davis Cup World Group First Round

Argentina
1
Patinódromo Municipal, Mar de Plata, Argentina
31 January – 2 February 2014
Clay

Italy
3

			1	2	3	4	5
1	(Argentina) (Italy)	Carlos Berlocq; Andreas Seppi	4; 6	6; 0	6; 2	6; 1
2	(Argentina) (Italy)	Juan Mónaco; Fabio Fognini	5; 7	2; 6	2; 6
3	(Argentina) (Italy)	Eduardo Schwank / Horacio Zeballos; Simone Bolelli / Fabio Fognini	7^{8} 6^{6}	6^{8} 7^{10}	6^{3} 7^{7}	4; 6
4	(Argentina) (Italy)	Carlos Berlocq; Fabio Fognini	6^{5} 7^{7}	6; 4	1; 6	4; 6
5	(Argentina) (Italy)	Juan Mónaco; Andreas Seppi						not played

2014 Davis Cup World Group Quarterfinals

Italy
3
Tennis Club Napoli, Naples, Italy
4–6 April 2014
Clay

Great Britain
2

			1	2	3	4	5
1	(Italy) (United Kingdom)	Fabio Fognini; James Ward	6; 4	2; 6	6; 4	6; 1
2	(Italy) (United Kingdom)	Andreas Seppi; Andy Murray	4; 6	5; 7	3; 6
3	(Italy) (United Kingdom)	Simone Bolelli / Fabio Fognini; Colin Fleming / Andy Murray	4; 6	2; 6	6; 3	5; 7
4	(Italy) (United Kingdom)	Fabio Fognini; Andy Murray	6; 3	6; 3	6; 4
5	(Italy) (United Kingdom)	Andreas Seppi; James Ward	6; 4	6; 3	6; 4

2014 Davis Cup World Group Semifinals

Switzerland
3
Palexpo, Geneva, Switzerland
12–14 September 2014
Hard (i)

Italy
2

			1	2	3	4	5
1	(Switzerland) (Italy)	Roger Federer; Simone Bolelli	7^{7} 6^{5}	6; 4	6; 4
2	(Switzerland) (Italy)	Stan Wawrinka; Fabio Fognini	6; 2	6; 3	6; 2
3	(Switzerland) (Italy)	Marco Chiudinelli / Stan Wawrinka; Simone Bolelli / Fabio Fognini	5; 7	6; 3	7; 5	3; 6	2; 6
4	(Switzerland) (Italy)	Roger Federer; Fabio Fognini	6; 2	6; 3	7^{7} 6^{4}
5	(Switzerland) (Italy)	Michael Lammer; Andreas Seppi	4; 6	6; 1	4; 6

=== 2015 ===
2015 Davis Cup World Group First Round

Kazakhstan
3
National Tennis Center, Astana, Kazakhstan
6–8 March 2015
Hard (i)

Italy
2

			1	2	3	4	5
1	(Kazakhstan) (Italy)	Mikhail Kukushkin; Simone Bolelli	7^{8} 6^{6}	6; 1	6; 2
2	(Kazakhstan) (Italy)	Andrey Golubev; Andreas Seppi	3; 6	3; 6	7^{7} 6^{5}	2; 6
3	(Kazakhstan) (Italy)	Andrey Golubev / Aleksandr Nedovyesov; Fabio Fognini / Simone Bolelli	6^{4} 7^{7}	3; 6	7^{15} 6^{13}	4; 6
4	(Kazakhstan) (Italy)	Mikhail Kukushkin; Andreas Seppi	7^{10} 6^{8}	6; 0	6; 4
5	(Kazakhstan) (Italy)	Aleksandr Nedovyesov; Fabio Fognini	7^{7} 6^{5}	3; 6	4; 6	6; 3	7; 5

2015 Davis Cup World Group play-offs

Russia
1
Baikal-Arena, Irkutsk, Russia
18–20 September 2015
Hard (i)

Italy
4

			1	2	3	4	5
1	(Russia) (Italy)	Teymuraz Gabashvili; Simone Bolelli	7^{7} 6^{2}	6; 1	6; 3
2	(Russia) (Italy)	Andrey Rublev; Fabio Fognini	6^{8} 7^{10}	2; 6	2; 6
3	(Russia) (Italy)	Evgeny Donskoy / Konstantin Kravchuk; Simone Bolelli / Fabio Fognini	5; 7	6; 2	6^{5} 7^{7}	6^{2} 7^{7}
4	(Russia) (Italy)	Teymuraz Gabashvili; Fabio Fognini	6^{4} 7^{7}	3; 6	6^{5} 7^{7}
5	(Russia) (Italy)	Konstantin Kravchuk; Paolo Lorenzi	4; 6	6^{3} 7^{7}

=== 2016 ===
2016 Davis Cup World Group First Round

Italy
5
Adriatic Arena, Pesaro, Italy
4–6 March 2016
Clay (i)

Switzerland
0

			1	2	3	4	5
1	(Italy) (Switzerland)	Paolo Lorenzi; Marco Chiudinelli	7^{16} 6^{14}	6; 3	4; 6	5; 7	7; 5
2	(Italy) (Switzerland)	Andreas Seppi; Henri Laaksonen	7; 5	7^{7} 6^{4}	3; 6	6; 3
3	(Italy) (Switzerland)	Simone Bolelli / Andreas Seppi; Marco Chiudinelli / Henri Laaksonen	6; 3	6; 1	6; 3
4	(Italy) (Switzerland)	Marco Cecchinato; Adrien Bossel	6; 3	7; 5
5	(Italy) (Switzerland)	Paolo Lorenzi; Antoine Bellier	6; 3	6; 2

2016 Davis Cup World Group Quarterfinals

Italy
1
Circolo Tennis Baratoff, Pesaro, Italy
15–17 July 2016
Clay

Argentina
3

			1	2	3	4	5
1	(Italy) (Argentina)	Andreas Seppi; Federico Delbonis	6^{4} 7^{7}	6; 3	3; 6	6^{3} 7^{7}
2	(Italy) (Argentina)	Fabio Fognini; Juan Mónaco	6; 1	6; 1	7; 5
3	(Italy) (Argentina)	Fabio Fognini / Paolo Lorenzi; Juan Martín del Potro / Guido Pella	1; 6	6^{4} 7^{7}	6; 3	6; 3	4; 6
4	(Italy) (Argentina)	Fabio Fognini; Federico Delbonis	4; 6	5; 7	6; 3	5; 7
5	(Italy) (Argentina)	Andreas Seppi; Juan Mónaco						not played

=== 2017 ===
2017 Davis Cup World Group First Round

Argentina
2
Parque Sarmiento, Buenos Aires, Argentina
3–6 February
Clay

Italy
3

			1	2	3	4	5
1	(Argentina) (Italy)	Guido Pella; Paolo Lorenzi	3; 6	3; 6	3; 6
2	(Argentina) (Italy)	Carlos Berlocq; Andreas Seppi	1; 6	2; 6	6; 1	6^{6} 7^{8}
3	(Argentina) (Italy)	Carlos Berlocq / Leonardo Mayer; Simone Bolelli / Fabio Fognini	6; 3	6; 3	4; 6	2; 6	7^{9} 6^{7}
4	(Argentina) (Italy)	Carlos Berlocq; Paolo Lorenzi	4; 6	6; 4	6; 1	3; 6	6; 3
5	(Argentina) (Italy)	Guido Pella; Fabio Fognini	6; 2	6; 4	3; 6	4; 6	2; 6

2017 Davis Cup World Group Quarterfinals

Belgium
3
RTL Spiroudome, Charleroi, Belgium
7–9 April 2017
Hard (i)

Italy
2

			1	2	3	4	5
1	(Belgium) (Italy)	Steve Darcis; Paolo Lorenzi	6^{3} 7^{7}	6; 1	6; 1	7^{7} 6^{4}
2	(Belgium) (Italy)	David Goffin; Andreas Seppi	6; 4	6; 3	6; 3
3	(Belgium) (Italy)	Ruben Bemelmans / Joris De Loore; Simone Bolelli / Andreas Seppi	6; 4	3; 6	4; 6	6; 3	6^{6} 7^{8}
4	(Belgium) (Italy)	David Goffin; Paolo Lorenzi	6; 3	6; 3	6; 2
5	(Belgium) (Italy)	Joris De Loore; Alessandro Giannessi	4; 6	6^{9} 7^{11}

=== 2018 ===
2018 Davis Cup World Group First Round

Japan
1
Morioka Takaya Arena, Morioka, Japan
2–4 February
Hard (i)

Italy
3

			1	2	3	4	5
1	(Japan) (Italy)	Taro Daniel; Fabio Fognini	4; 6	6; 3	6; 4	3; 6	2; 6
2	(Japan) (Italy)	Yūichi Sugita; Andreas Seppi	4; 6	6; 2	6; 4	4; 6	7^{7} 6^{1}
3	(Japan) (Italy)	Ben McLachlan / Yasutaka Uchiyama; Simone Bolelli / Fabio Fognini	5; 7	7^{7} 6^{4}	6^{3} 7^{7}	5; 7
4	(Japan) (Italy)	Yūichi Sugita; Fabio Fognini	6; 3	1; 6	6; 3	6^{6} 7^{8}	5; 7
5	(Japan) (Italy)	Taro Daniel; Andreas Seppi						not played

2018 Davis Cup World Group Quarterfinals

Italy
1
Valletta Cambiaso ASD, Genoa, Italy
6–8 April
Clay

France
3

			1	2	3	4	5
1	(Italy) (France)	Andreas Seppi; Lucas Pouille	3; 6	2; 6	6; 4	6; 3	1; 6
2	(Italy) (France)	Fabio Fognini; Jérémy Chardy	6^{6} 7^{8}	6; 2	6; 2	6; 3
3	(Italy) (France)	Simone Bolelli / Fabio Fognini; Pierre-Hugues Herbert / Nicolas Mahut	4; 6	3; 6	1; 6
4	(Italy) (France)	Fabio Fognini; Lucas Pouille	6; 2	1; 6	6^{3} 7^{7}	3; 6
5	(Italy) (France)	Andreas Seppi; Jérémy Chardy						not played

=== 2019 ===
2019 Davis Cup qualifying round

India
1
Calcutta South Club, Kolkata, India
1–2 February 2019
Grass

Italy
3

			1	2	3
1	(India) (Italy)	Ramkumar Ramanathan; Andreas Seppi	4; 6	2; 6
2	(India) (Italy)	Prajnesh Gunneswaran; Matteo Berrettini	4; 6	3; 6
3	(India) (Italy)	Rohan Bopanna / Divij Sharan; Matteo Berrettini / Simone Bolelli	4; 6	6; 3	6; 4
4	(India) (Italy)	Prajnesh Gunneswaran; Andreas Seppi	1; 6	4; 6
5	(India) (Italy)	Ramkumar Ramanathan; Matteo Berrettini				not played

2019 Davis Cup Finals
Group F

Italy
1
Caja Magica, Madrid, Spain
18 November 2019
Hard

Canada
2

			1	2	3
1	(Italy) (Canada)	Fabio Fognini; Vasek Pospisil	6^{5} 7^{7}	5; 7
2	(Italy) (Canada)	Matteo Berrettini; Denis Shapovalov	6^{5} 7^{7}	7^{7} 6^{3}	6^{5} 7^{7}
3	(Italy) (Canada)	Matteo Berrettini / Fabio Fognini; Vasek Pospisil / Denis Shapovalov	6; 2	3; 6	6; 3

2019 Davis Cup Finals
Group F

United States
2
Caja Magica, Madrid, Spain
20 November 2019
Hard

Italy
1

			1	2	3
1	(United States) (Italy)	Reilly Opelka; Fabio Fognini	4; 6	7^{7} 6^{4}	3; 6
2	(United States) (Italy)	Taylor Fritz; Matteo Berrettini	5; 7	7^{7} 6^{5}	6; 2
3	(United States) (Italy)	Sam Querrey / Jack Sock; Simone Bolelli / Fabio Fognini	6^{4} 7^{7}	7^{7} 6^{2}	6; 4

== 2020s ==
=== 2020–21 ===
2020 Davis Cup qualifying round

Italy
4
Circolo Tennis Cagliari, Cagliari, Italy
6–7 March 2020
Clay

South Korea
0

			1	2	3
1	(Italy) (South Korea)	Fabio Fognini; Lee Duck-hee	6; 0	6; 3
2	(Italy) (South Korea)	Gianluca Mager; Nam Ji-sung	6; 3	7; 5
3	(Italy) (South Korea)	Simone Bolelli / Fabio Fognini; Nam Ji-sung / Song Min-kyu	6; 3	6; 1
4	(Italy) (South Korea)	Stefano Travaglia; Chung Yun-seong	6; 0	6; 1
5	(Italy) (South Korea)	Gianluca Mager; Lee Duck-hee				not played

2021 Davis Cup Finals
Group E

United States
1
Pala Alpitour, Turin, Italy
26 November 2021
Hard (i)

Italy
2

			1	2	3
1	(United States) (Italy)	Reilly Opelka; Lorenzo Sonego	3; 6	6^{4} 7^{7}
2	(United States) (Italy)	John Isner; Jannik Sinner	2; 6	0; 6
3	(United States) (Italy)	Rajeev Ram / Jack Sock; Fabio Fognini / Lorenzo Musetti	7^{7} 6^{5}	6; 2

2021 Davis Cup Finals
Group E

Italy
2
Pala Alpitour, Turin, Italy
27 November 2021
Hard (i)

Colombia
1

			1	2	3
1	(Italy) (Colombia)	Lorenzo Sonego; Nicolás Mejía	6^{5} 7^{7}	6; 4	6; 2
2	(Italy) (Colombia)	Jannik Sinner; Daniel Elahi Galán	7; 5	6; 0
3	(Italy) (Colombia)	Fabio Fognini / Jannik Sinner; Juan Sebastián Cabal / Robert Farah	2; 6	7; 5	6^{6} 7^{8}

2021 Davis Cup Finals Quarterfinals

Italy
1
Pala Alpitour, Turin, Italy
29 November 2021
Hard (i)

Croatia
2

			1	2	3
1	(Italy) (Croatia)	Lorenzo Sonego; Borna Gojo	6^{2} 7^{7}	6; 2	2; 6
2	(Italy) (Croatia)	Jannik Sinner; Marin Čilić	3; 6	7^{7} 6^{4}	6; 3
3	(Italy) (Croatia)	Fabio Fognini / Jannik Sinner; Nikola Mektić / Mate Pavić	3; 6	4; 6

=== 2022 ===
2022 Davis Cup qualifying round

Slovakia
2
AXA Aréna NTC, Bratislava, Slovakia
4–5 March 2022
Hard (i)

Italy
3

			1	2	3
1	(Slovakia) (Italy)	Norbert Gombos; Jannik Sinner	4; 6	6; 4	4; 6
2	(Slovakia) (Italy)	Filip Horanský; Lorenzo Sonego	7^{7} 6^{2}	6; 3
3	(Slovakia) (Italy)	Filip Polášek / Igor Zelenay; Simone Bolelli / Jannik Sinner	6; 3	1; 6	7^{7} 6^{3}
4	(Slovakia) (Italy)	Filip Horanský; Jannik Sinner	5; 7	4; 6
5	(Slovakia) (Italy)	Norbert Gombos; Lorenzo Musetti	7^{7} 6^{3}	2; 6	4; 6

2022 Davis Cup Finals
Group A

Italy
3
Unipol Arena, Bologna, Italy
14 September 2022
Hard (i)

Croatia
0

			1	2	3
1	(Italy) (Croatia)	Lorenzo Musetti; Borna Gojo	6; 4	6; 2
2	(Italy) (Croatia)	Matteo Berrettini; Borna Ćorić	6^{4} 7^{7}	6; 2	6; 1
3	(Italy) (Croatia)	Simone Bolelli / Fabio Fognini; Nikola Mektić / Mate Pavić	3; 6	7; 5	7^{7} 6^{3}

2022 Davis Cup Finals
Group A

Italy
2
Unipol Arena, Bologna, Italy
16 September 2022
Hard (i)

Argentina
1

			1	2	3
1	(Italy) (Argentina)	Matteo Berrettini; Sebastián Báez	6; 2	6; 3
2	(Italy) (Argentina)	Jannik Sinner; Francisco Cerúndolo	7; 5	1; 6	6; 3
3	(Italy) (Argentina)	Simone Bolelli / Fabio Fognini; Máximo González / Horacio Zeballos	5; 7	6; 2	3; 6

2022 Davis Cup Finals
Group A

Italy
2
Unipol Arena, Bologna, Italy
18 September 2022
Hard (i)

Sweden
1

			1	2	3
1	(Italy) (Sweden)	Matteo Berrettini; Elias Ymer	6; 4	6; 4
2	(Italy) (Sweden)	Jannik Sinner; Mikael Ymer	4; 6	6; 3	3; 6
3	(Italy) (Sweden)	Simone Bolelli / Fabio Fognini; André Göransson / Dragoș Nicolae Mădăraș	7^{7} 6^{1}	6; 2

2022 Davis Cup Finals Quarterfinals

Italy
2
Martin Carpena Arena, Málaga, Spain
24 November 2022
Hard (i)

United States
1

			1	2	3
1	(Italy) (United States)	Lorenzo Sonego; Frances Tiafoe	6; 3	7^{9} 6^{7}
2	(Italy) (United States)	Lorenzo Musetti; Taylor Fritz	6^{8} 7^{10}	3; 6
3	(Italy) (United States)	Simone Bolelli / Fabio Fognini; Tommy Paul / Jack Sock	6; 4	6; 4

2022 Davis Cup Finals Semifinals

Italy
1
Martin Carpena Arena, Málaga, Spain
26 November 2022
Hard (i)

Canada
2

			1	2	3
1	(Italy) (Canada)	Lorenzo Sonego; Denis Shapovalov	7^{7} 6^{4}	6^{5} 7^{7}	6; 4
2	(Italy) (Canada)	Lorenzo Musetti; Félix Auger-Aliassime	3; 6	4; 6
3	(Italy) (Canada)	Matteo Berrettini / Fabio Fognini; Félix Auger-Aliassime / Vasek Pospisil	6^{2} 7^{7}	5; 7

=== 2023 ===
2023 Davis Cup Finals
Group A

Canada
3
Unipol Arena, Bologna, Italy
13 September 2023
Hard (i)

Italy
0

			1	2	3
1	(Canada) (Italy)	Alexis Galarneau; Lorenzo Sonego	7^{10} 6^{8}	6; 4
2	(Canada) (Italy)	Gabriel Diallo; Lorenzo Musetti	7; 5	6; 4
3	(Canada) (Italy)	Alexis Galarneau / Vasek Pospisil; Matteo Arnaldi / Simone Bolelli	6^{4} 7^{7}	6; 4	7^{7} 6^{3}

2023 Davis Cup Finals
Group A

Italy
3
Unipol Arena, Bologna, Italy
15 September 2023
Hard (i)

Chile
0

			1	2	3
1	(Italy) (Chile)	Matteo Arnaldi; Cristian Garín	2; 6	6; 4	6; 3
2	(Italy) (Chile)	Lorenzo Sonego; Nicolás Jarry	3; 6	7; 5	6; 4
3	(Italy) (Chile)	Lorenzo Musetti / Lorenzo Sonego; Tomás Barrios Vera / Alejandro Tabilo	6^{3} 7^{7}	6; 3	7^{7} 6^{2}

2023 Davis Cup Finals
Group A

Italy
2
Unipol Arena, Bologna, Italy
17 September 2023

Sweden
1

			1	2	3
1	(Italy) (Sweden)	Matteo Arnaldi; Leo Borg	6; 4	6; 3
2	(Italy) (Sweden)	Lorenzo Sonego; Elias Ymer	6; 4	6; 4
3	(Italy) (Sweden)	Simone Bolelli / Lorenzo Musetti; Filip Bergevi / André Göransson	6; 4	6^{4} 7^{7}	8; 10

2023 Davis Cup Finals Quarterfinals

Italy
2
Martin Carpena Arena, Málaga, Spain
23 November 2023
Hard (i)

Netherlands
1

			1	2	3
1	(Italy) (Netherlands)	Matteo Arnaldi; Botic van de Zandschulp	7^{8} 6^{6}	3; 6	6^{7} 7^{9}
2	(Italy) (Netherlands)	Jannik Sinner; Tallon Griekspoor	7^{7} 6^{3}	6; 1
3	(Italy) (Netherlands)	Jannik Sinner / Lorenzo Sonego; Tallon Griekspoor / Wesley Koolhof	6; 3	6; 4

2023 Davis Cup Finals
Semifinals

Italy
2
Martin Carpena Arena, Málaga, Spain
25 November 2023
Hard (i)

Serbia
1

			1	2	3
1	(Italy) (Serbia)	Lorenzo Musetti; Miomir Kecmanović	7^{9} 6^{7}	2; 6	1; 6
2	(Italy) (Serbia)	Jannik Sinner; Novak Djokovic	6; 2	2; 6	7; 5
3	(Italy) (Serbia)	Jannik Sinner / Lorenzo Sonego; Novak Djokovic / Miomir Kecmanović	6; 3	6; 4

2023 Davis Cup Finals
Final

Australia
0
Martin Carpena Arena, Málaga, Spain
26 November 2023
Hard (i)

Italy
2

			1	2	3
1	(Australia) (Italy)	Alexei Popyrin; Matteo Arnaldi	5; 7	6; 2	4; 6
2	(Australia) (Italy)	Alex de Minaur; Jannik Sinner	3; 6	0; 6
3	(Australia) (Italy)	Matthew Ebden / Max Purcell; Simone Bolelli / Lorenzo Sonego				not played

=== 2024 ===
2024 Davis Cup Finals
Group A

Italy
2
Unipol Arena, Bologna, Italy
11 September 2024
Hard (i)

Brazil
1

			1	2	3
1	(Italy) (Brazil)	Matteo Berrettini; João Fonseca	6; 1	7^{7} 6^{5}
2	(Italy) (Brazil)	Matteo Arnaldi; Thiago Monteiro	7; 5	6^{4} 7^{7}	7^{7} 6^{5}
3	(Italy) (Brazil)	Simone Bolelli / Andrea Vavassori; Rafael Matos / Marcelo Melo	7^{7} 6^{3}	6^{6} 7^{8}	5; 7

2024 Davis Cup Finals
Group A

Italy
2
Unipol Arena, Bologna, Italy
13 September 2024
Hard (i)

Belgium
1

			1	2	3
1	(Italy) (Belgium)	Matteo Berrettini; Alexander Blockx	3; 6	6; 2	7; 5
2	(Italy) (Belgium)	Flavio Cobolli; Zizou Bergs	3; 6	7^{7} 6^{5}	0; 6
3	(Italy) (Belgium)	Simone Bolelli / Andrea Vavassori; Sander Gillé / Joran Vliegen	7^{7} 6^{2}	7; 5

2024 Davis Cup Finals
Group A

Italy
2
Unipol Arena, Bologna, Italy
15 September 2024
Hard (i)

Netherlands
1

			1	2	3
1	(Italy) (Netherlands)	Matteo Berrettini; Botic van de Zandschulp	3; 6	6; 4	6; 4
2	(Italy) (Netherlands)	Flavio Cobolli; Tallon Griekspoor	7^{7} 6^{4}	4; 6	6; 3
3	(Italy) (Netherlands)	Simone Bolelli / Andrea Vavassori; Wesley Koolhof / Botic van de Zandschulp	6^{6} 7^{8}	5; 7

2024 Davis Cup Finals
Quarterfinals

Italy
2
Martin Carpena Arena, Málaga, Spain
21 November 2024
Hard (i)

Argentina
1

			1	2	3
1	(Italy) (Argentina)	Lorenzo Musetti; Francisco Cerúndolo	4; 6	1; 6
2	(Italy) (Argentina)	Jannik Sinner; Sebastián Báez	6; 2	6; 1
3	(Italy) (Argentina)	Matteo Berrettini / Jannik Sinner; Máximo González / Andrés Molteni	6; 4	7; 5

2024 Davis Cup Finals
Semifinals

Italy
2
Martin Carpena Arena, Málaga, Spain
23 November 2024
Hard (i)

Australia
0

			1	2	3
1	(Italy) (Australia)	Matteo Berrettini; Thanasi Kokkinakis	6^{6} 7^{8}	6; 3	7; 5
2	(Italy) (Australia)	Jannik Sinner; Alex de Minaur	6; 3	6; 4
3	(Italy) (Australia)	Simone Bolelli / Andrea Vavassori; Matthew Ebden / Jordan Thompson				not played

2024 Davis Cup Finals
Final

Italy
2
Martin Carpena Arena, Málaga, Spain
24 November 2024
Hard (i)

Netherlands
0

			1	2	3
1	(Italy) (Netherlands)	Matteo Berrettini; Botic van de Zandschulp	6; 4	6; 2
2	(Italy) (Netherlands)	Jannik Sinner; Tallon Griekspoor	7^{7} 6^{2}	6; 2
3	(Italy) (Netherlands)	Simone Bolelli / Andrea Vavassori; Wesley Koolhof / Botic van de Zandschulp				not played

=== 2025 ===
2025 Davis Cup Finals
Quarterfinals

Italy
2
SuperTennis Arena, Bologna, Italy
19 November 2025
Hard (i)

Austria
0

			1	2	3
1	(Italy) (Austria)	Matteo Berrettini; Jurij Rodionov	6; 3	7^{7} 6^{4}
2	(Italy) (Austria)	Flavio Cobolli; Filip Misolic	6; 1	6; 3
3	(Italy) (Austria)	Simone Bolelli / Andrea Vavassori; Alexander Erler / Lucas Miedler				not played

2025 Davis Cup Finals
Semifinals

Italy
2
SuperTennis Arena, Bologna, Italy
21 November 2025
Hard (i)

Belgium
0

			1	2	3
1	(Italy) (Belgium)	Matteo Berrettini; Raphaël Collignon	6; 3	6; 4
2	(Italy) (Belgium)	Flavio Cobolli; Zizou Bergs	6; 3	6^{5} 7^{7}	7^{17} 6^{15}
3	(Italy) (Belgium)	Simone Bolelli / Andrea Vavassori; Sander Gillé / Joran Vliegen				not played

2025 Davis Cup Finals
Final

Italy
2
SuperTennis Arena, Bologna, Italy
23 November 2025
Hard (i)

Spain
0

			1	2	3
1	(Italy) (Spain)	Matteo Berrettini; Pablo Carreño Busta	6; 3	6; 4
2	(Italy) (Spain)	Flavio Cobolli; Jaume Munar	1; 6	7^{7} 6^{5}	7; 5
3	(Italy) (Spain)	Simone Bolelli / Andrea Vavassori; Marcel Granollers / Pedro Martínez				not played

== See also ==
- Italy Davis Cup team results (1922–1949)
- Italy Davis Cup team results (1950–1969)
- Italy Davis Cup team results (1970–1999)
