= 2010 Davis Cup Europe Zone Group III =

International tennis competition

The 2010 Davis Cup Europe Zone Group III was played from 10 to 15 May at the Athens Olympic Tennis Centre in Marousi, Greece.

The draw for the competition took place in Marousi on 9 May 2010.

== Group A ==
		(Luxembourg)	(Georgia (country))	(Malta)	(Andorra)	(Iceland)
1	Luxembourg (4–0)		2–1	3–0	2–1	3–0
2	Georgia (3–1)	1–2		2–1	2–1	3–0
3	Malta (2–2)	0–3	1–2		2–1	2–1
4	Andorra (1–3)	1–2	1–2	1–2		2–1
5	Iceland (0–4)	0–3	0–3	1–2	1–2	

=== Iceland vs. Georgia ===
Iceland
0
Olympic Tennis Center, Marousi, Greece
May 10, 2010
Hard

Georgia
3

			1	2	3
1	(Iceland) (Georgia (country))	Raj-Kumar Bonifacius; Lado Chikhladze	3; 6	3; 6
2	(Iceland) (Georgia (country))	Andri Jonsson; George Tsivadze	4; 6	2; 6
3	(Iceland) (Georgia (country))	Andri Jonsson / Leifur Sigurðarson; Lado Chikhladze / Irakli Labadze	0; 6	2; 6

=== Malta vs. Luxembourg ===
Malta
0
Olympic Tennis Center, Marousi, Greece
May 10, 2010
Hard

Luxembourg
3

			1	2	3
1	(Malta) (Luxembourg)	Denzil Agius; Mike Scheidweiler	0; 6	0; 6
2	(Malta) (Luxembourg)	Matthew Asciak; Gilles Müller	3; 6	2; 6
3	(Malta) (Luxembourg)	Matthew Asciak / Mark Gatt; Gilles Müller / Mike Scheidweiler	0; 6	0; 6

=== Malta vs. Andorra ===
Malta
2
Olympic Tennis Center, Marousi, Greece
May 11, 2010
Hard

Andorra
1

			1	2	3
1	(Malta) (Andorra)	Denzil Agius; Pau Gerbaud-Farras	2; 6	2; 6
2	(Malta) (Andorra)	Matthew Asciak; Jean-Baptiste Poux-Gautier	7; 5	6; 5		retired
3	(Malta) (Andorra)	Matthew Asciak / Mark Gatt; Jordi Vila-Vila / Hector Hormigo-Herrera	5; 7	6; 4	6; 4

=== Luxembourg vs. Iceland ===
Luxembourg
3
Olympic Tennis Center, Marousi, Greece
May 11, 2010
Hard

Iceland
0

			1	2	3
1	(Luxembourg) (Iceland)	Laurent Bram; Raj-Kumar Bonifacius	6; 0	6; 3
2	(Luxembourg) (Iceland)	Gilles Müller; Andri Jonsson	6; 0	6; 3
3	(Luxembourg) (Iceland)	Gilles Müller / Laurent Bram; Andri Jonsson / Leifur Sigurðarson	6; 4	6; 2

=== Andorra vs. Georgia ===
Andorra
1
Olympic Tennis Center, Marousi, Greece
May 12, 2010
Hard

Georgia
2

			1	2	3
1	(Andorra) (Georgia (country))	Pau Gerbaud-Farras; Lado Chikhladze	2; 6	4; 6
2	(Andorra) (Georgia (country))	Jean-Baptiste Poux-Gautier; George Tsivadze	6; 4	6; 3
3	(Andorra) (Georgia (country))	Jordi Vila-Vila / Hector Hormigo-Herrera; Lado Chikhladze / Irakli Labadze	3; 6	2; 6

=== Malta vs. Iceland ===
Malta
2
Olympic Tennis Center, Marousi, Greece
May 12, 2010
Hard

Iceland
1

			1	2	3
1	(Malta) (Iceland)	Bradley Callus; Andri Jonsson	3; 6	1; 6
2	(Malta) (Iceland)	Matthew Asciak; Birkir Gunnarsson	6; 2	6; 1
3	(Malta) (Iceland)	Matthew Asciak / Mark Gatt; Andri Jonsson / Leifur Sigurðarson	6; 4	2; 6	6; 3

=== Luxembourg vs. Georgia ===
Luxembourg
2
Olympic Tennis Center, Marousi, Greece
May 13, 2010
Hard

Georgia
1

			1	2	3
1	(Luxembourg) (Georgia (country))	Mike Scheidweiler; Lado Chikhladze	3; 6	4; 6
2	(Luxembourg) (Georgia (country))	Gilles Müller; Nodar Itonishvili	6; 2	6; 1
3	(Luxembourg) (Georgia (country))	Gilles Müller / Mike Scheidweiler; Lado Chikhladze / Irakli Labadze	7^{7} 6^{4}	6; 1

=== Iceland vs. Andorra ===
Iceland
1
Olympic Tennis Center, Marousi, Greece
May 13, 2010
Hard

Andorra
2

			1	2	3
1	(Iceland) (Andorra)	Raj-Kumar Bonifacius; Pau Gerbaud-Farras	7^{7} 6^{2}	6; 3
2	(Iceland) (Andorra)	Andri Jonsson; Jean-Baptiste Poux-Gautier	6^{5} 7^{7}	3; 6
3	(Iceland) (Andorra)	Raj-Kumar Bonifacius / Leifur Sigurðarson; Jean-Baptiste Poux-Gautier / Jordi Vila-Vila	6; 2	0; 6	4; 6

=== Malta vs. Georgia ===
Malta
1
Olympic Tennis Center, Marousi, Greece
May 14, 2010
Hard

Georgia
2

			1	2	3
1	(Malta) (Georgia (country))	Bradley Callus; Lado Chikhladze	0; 6	1; 6
2	(Malta) (Georgia (country))	Matthew Asciak; George Tsivadze	6; 3	6; 4
3	(Malta) (Georgia (country))	Matthew Asciak / Mark Gatt; Lado Chikhladze / Irakli Labadze	2; 6	4; 6

=== Luxembourg vs. Andorra ===
Luxembourg
2
Olympic Tennis Center, Marousi, Greece
May 14, 2010
Hard

Andorra
1

			1	2	3
1	(Luxembourg) (Andorra)	Mike Scheidweiler; Pau Gerbaud-Farras	6; 2	7^{7} 6^{4}
2	(Luxembourg) (Andorra)	Gilles Müller; Jean-Baptiste Poux-Gautier	7; 5	6; 2
3	(Luxembourg) (Andorra)	Laurent Bram / Joe Hatto; Jean-Baptiste Poux-Gautier / Jordi Vila-Vila	6; 1	3; 6	4; 6

== Group B ==
		(Greece)	(Moldova)	(Montenegro)	(Armenia)	(San Marino)	(Albania)
1	Greece (5–0)		2–1	2–1	3–0	3–0	3–0
2	Moldova (4–1)	1–2		2–1	3–0	3–0	3–0
3	Montenegro (3–2)	1–2	1–2		3–0	3–0	3–0
4	Armenia (2–3)	0–3	0–3	0–3		3–0	3–0
5	San Marino (1–4)	0–3	0–3	0–3	0–3		3–0
6	Albania (0–5)	0–3	0–3	0–3	0–3	0–3	

=== Greece vs. Albania ===
Greece
3
Olympic Tennis Center, Marousi, Greece
May 10, 2010
Hard

Albania
0

			1	2	3
1	(Greece) (Albania)	Alexandros Jakupovic; Flavio Deçe	6; 1	6; 2
2	(Greece) (Albania)	Theodoros Angelinos; Ferat Istrefi	6; 0	6; 1
3	(Greece) (Albania)	Konstantinos Economidis / Charalampos Kapogiannis; Genci Cakciri / Ferat Istrefi	6; 1	6; 3

=== San Marino vs. Moldova ===
San Marino
0
Olympic Tennis Center, Marousi, Greece
May 10, 2010
Hard

Moldova
3

			1	2	3
1	(San Marino) (Moldova)	Domenico Vicini; Radu Albot	0; 6	1; 6
2	(San Marino) (Moldova)	Diego Zonzini; Andrei Gorban	1; 6	1; 6
3	(San Marino) (Moldova)	Domenico Vicini / Diego Zonzini; Radu Albot / Roman Borvanov	1; 6	1; 6

=== Armenia vs. Montenegro ===
Armenia
0
Olympic Tennis Center, Marousi, Greece
May 10, 2010
Hard

Montenegro
3

			1	2	3
1	(Armenia) (Montenegro)	Harutyun Sofyan; Daniel Danilović	1; 6	2; 6
2	(Armenia) (Montenegro)	Khachatur Khachatryan; Goran Tošić	2; 6	1; 6
3	(Armenia) (Montenegro)	Khachatur Khachatryan / Harutyun Sofyan; Ljubomir Čelebić / Nemanja Kontić	1; 6	2; 6

=== Greece vs. Montenegro ===
Greece
2
Olympic Tennis Center, Marousi, Greece
May 11, 2010
Hard

Montenegro
1

			1	2	3
1	(Greece) (Montenegro)	Alexandros Jakupovic; Daniel Danilović	6; 4	6^{7} 7^{9}	6^{4} 7^{7}
2	(Greece) (Montenegro)	Theodoros Angelinos; Goran Tošić	6; 4	7^{7} 6^{5}
3	(Greece) (Montenegro)	Konstantinos Economidis / Alexandros Jakupovic; Ljubomir Čelebić / Nemanja Kontić	6; 3	7; 5

=== Albania vs. Moldova ===
Albania
0
Olympic Tennis Center, Marousi, Greece
May 11, 2010
Hard

Moldova
3

			1	2	3
1	(Albania) (Moldova)	Flavio Deçe; Radu Albot	1; 6	2; 6
2	(Albania) (Moldova)	Ferat Istrefi; Andrei Gorban	0; 6	1; 6
3	(Albania) (Moldova)	Genci Cakciri / Flavio Deçe; Radu Albot / Roman Borvanov	0; 6	1; 6

=== San Marino vs. Armenia ===
San Marino
0
Olympic Tennis Center, Marousi, Greece
May 11, 2010
Hard

Armenia
3

			1	2	3
1	(San Marino) (Armenia)	Alberto Brighi; Harutyun Sofyan	4; 6	2; 6
2	(San Marino) (Armenia)	Diego Zonzini; Ashot Gevorgyan	2; 6	7; 5	2; 6
3	(San Marino) (Armenia)	Domenico Vicini / Diego Zonzini; Khachatur Khachatryan / Harutyun Sofyan	5; 7	6^{5} 7^{7}

=== Greece vs. San Marino ===
Greece
3
Olympic Tennis Center, Marousi, Greece
May 12, 2010
Hard

San Marino
0

			1	2	3
1	(Greece) (San Marino)	Konstantinos Economidis; Alberto Brighi	6; 0	6; 0
2	(Greece) (San Marino)	Theodoros Angelinos; Diego Zonzini	6; 2	6; 1
3	(Greece) (San Marino)	Konstantinos Economidis / Alexandros Jakupovic; Domenico Vicini / Diego Zonzini	6; 2	6; 2

=== Moldova vs. Armenia ===
Moldova
3
Olympic Tennis Center, Marousi, Greece
May 12, 2010
Hard

Armenia
0

			1	2	3
1	(Moldova) (Armenia)	Roman Borvanov; Ashot Gevorgyan	6; 2	6; 2
2	(Moldova) (Armenia)	Radu Albot; Khachatur Khachatryan	6; 0	6; 0
3	(Moldova) (Armenia)	Radu Albot / Roman Borvanov; Ashot Gevorgyan / Khachatur Khachatryan	6; 3	6; 1

=== Montenegro vs. Albania ===
Montenegro
3
Olympic Tennis Center, Marousi, Greece
May 12, 2010
Hard

Albania
0

			1	2	3
1	(Montenegro) (Albania)	Ljubomir Čelebić; Martin Hysenbegasi	6; 0	6; 1
2	(Montenegro) (Albania)	Nemanja Kontić; Genci Cakciri	6; 3	6; 3
3	(Montenegro) (Albania)	Ljubomir Čelebić / Nemanja Kontić; Flavio Deçe / Ferat Istrefi	7; 5	6; 0

=== Greece vs. Moldova ===
Greece
2
Olympic Tennis Center, Marousi, Greece
May 13, 2010
Hard

Moldova
1

			1	2	3
1	(Greece) (Moldova)	Alexandros Jakupovic; Radu Albot	2; 6	4; 6
2	(Greece) (Moldova)	Theodoros Angelinos; Andrei Gorban	6; 2	6; 4
3	(Greece) (Moldova)	Konstantinos Economidis / Alexandros Jakupovic; Radu Albot / Andrei Gorban	6; 1	2; 6	6; 4

=== Montenegro vs. San Marino ===
Montenegro
3
Olympic Tennis Center, Marousi, Greece
May 13, 2010
Hard

San Marino
0

			1	2	3
1	(Montenegro) (San Marino)	Ljubomir Čelebić; Alberto Brighi	6; 1	6; 0
2	(Montenegro) (San Marino)	Daniel Danilović; Diego Zonzini	6; 0	6; 1
3	(Montenegro) (San Marino)	Ljubomir Čelebić / Nemanja Kontić; Domenico Vicini / Diego Zonzini	6; 3	6; 1

=== Armenia vs. Albania ===
Armenia
3
Olympic Tennis Center, Marousi, Greece
May 13, 2010
Hard

Albania
0

			1	2	3
1	(Armenia) (Albania)	Harutyun Sofyan; Flavio Deçe	6; 2	7^{7} 6^{2}
2	(Armenia) (Albania)	Ashot Gevorgyan; Ferat Istrefi	6; 1	2; 6	7; 5
3	(Armenia) (Albania)	Khachatur Khachatryan / Harutyun Sofyan; Genci Cakciri / Flavio Deçe	6; 2	6; 1

=== Greece vs. Armenia ===
Greece
3
Olympic Tennis Center, Marousi, Greece
May 14, 2010
Hard

Armenia
0

			1	2	3
1	(Greece) (Armenia)	Charalampos Kapogiannis; Ashot Gevorgyan	6; 2	6; 3
2	(Greece) (Armenia)	Konstantinos Economidis; Khachatur Khachatryan	6; 0	6; 1
3	(Greece) (Armenia)	Theodoros Angelinos / Alexandros Jakupovic; Ashot Gevorgyan / Khachatur Khachatryan	6; 4	6; 0

=== Moldova vs. Montenegro ===
Moldova
2
Olympic Tennis Center, Marousi, Greece
May 14, 2010
Hard

Montenegro
1

			1	2	3
1	(Moldova) (Montenegro)	Radu Albot; Daniel Danilović	6; 3	6; 4
2	(Moldova) (Montenegro)	Andrei Gorban; Goran Tošić	5; 7	6; 4	3; 6
3	(Moldova) (Montenegro)	Radu Albot / Roman Borvanov; Daniel Danilović / Goran Tošić	6^{3} 7^{7}	6; 4	6; 4

=== San Marino vs. Albania ===
San Marino
3
Olympic Tennis Center, Marousi, Greece
May 14, 2010
Hard

Albania
0

			1	2	3
1	(San Marino) (Albania)	Domenico Vicini; Flavio Deçe	6; 1	6; 2
2	(San Marino) (Albania)	Diego Zonzini; Ferat Istrefi	6; 2	6; 4
3	(San Marino) (Albania)	Alberto Brighi / Diego Zonzini; Genci Cakciri / Martin Hysenbegasi	6; 1	6; 2

== Play-offs ==
=== 1st to 4th play-offs ===
==== Greece vs. Georgia ====
Greece
2
Olympic Tennis Center, Marousi, Greece
May 15, 2010
Hard

Georgia
1

			1	2	3
1	(Greece) (Georgia (country))	Konstantinos Economidis; Lado Chikhladze	6^{5} 7^{7}	7^{7} 6^{4}	7^{7} 6^{4}
2	(Greece) (Georgia (country))	Theodoros Angelinos; Irakli Labadze	7^{7} 6^{5}	6; 2
3	(Greece) (Georgia (country))	Konstantinos Economidis / Alexandros Jakupovic; Lado Chikhladze / Irakli Labadze				w/o

==== Moldova vs. Luxembourg ====
Moldova
1
Olympic Tennis Center, Marousi, Greece
May 15, 2010
Hard

Luxembourg
2

			1	2	3
1	(Moldova) (Luxembourg)	Radu Albot; Mike Scheidweiler	6; 3	6; 3
2	(Moldova) (Luxembourg)	Andrei Gorban; Gilles Müller	4; 6	2; 6
3	(Moldova) (Luxembourg)	Radu Albot / Roman Borvanov; Gilles Müller / Mike Scheidweiler	6^{4} 7^{7}	3; 6

=== 5th-place play-off – Montenegro vs. Malta ===
Montenegro
3
Olympic Tennis Center, Marousi, Greece
May 15, 2010
Hard

Malta
0

			1	2	3
1	(Montenegro) (Malta)	Ljubomir Čelebić; Denzil Agius	6; 2	6; 2
2	(Montenegro) (Malta)	Daniel Danilović; Bradley Callus	6; 2	6; 1
3	(Montenegro) (Malta)	Ljubomir Čelebić / Nemanja Kontić; Matthew Asciak / Bradley Callus	7; 5	6; 3

=== 7th-place play-off – Andorra vs. Armenia ===
Andorra
0
Olympic Tennis Center, Marousi, Greece
May 15, 2010
Hard

Armenia
3

			1	2	3
1	(Andorra) (Armenia)	Pau Gerbaud-Farras; Ashot Gevorgyan	2; 6	1; 6
2	(Andorra) (Armenia)	Hector Hormigo-Herrera; Khachatur Khachatryan	6; 1	6^{2} 7^{7}	2; 3	retired
3	(Andorra) (Armenia)	Pau Gerbaud-Farras / Jordi Vila-Vila; Khachatur Khachatryan / Harutyun Sofyan				w/o

=== 9th-place play-off – San Marino vs. Iceland ===
San Marino
1
Olympic Tennis Center, Marousi, Greece
May 15, 2010
Hard

Iceland
2

			1	2	3
1	(San Marino) (Iceland)	Domenico Vicini; Raj-Kumar Bonifacius	6^{3} 7^{7}	4; 6
2	(San Marino) (Iceland)	Diego Zonzini; Andri Jonsson	6; 4	6; 3
3	(San Marino) (Iceland)	Domenico Vicini / Diego Zonzini; Andri Jonsson / Leifur Sigurðarson	7^{8} 6^{6}	5; 7	6^{5} 7^{7}

== Final standings ==
Rank	Team
1	Greece
1	Luxembourg
3	Georgia
3	Moldova
5	Montenegro
6	Malta
7	Armenia
8	Andorra
9	Iceland
10	San Marino
11	Albania

- Greece and Luxembourg were promoted to Europe/Africa Zone Group II in 2011.
