= List of Zimbabwe Davis Cup team representatives =

This is a list of tennis players who have represented the Zimbabwe Davis Cup team in an official Davis Cup match. Zimbabwe have taken part in the competition since 1963. They were known as Rhodesia until 1981

== Players ==
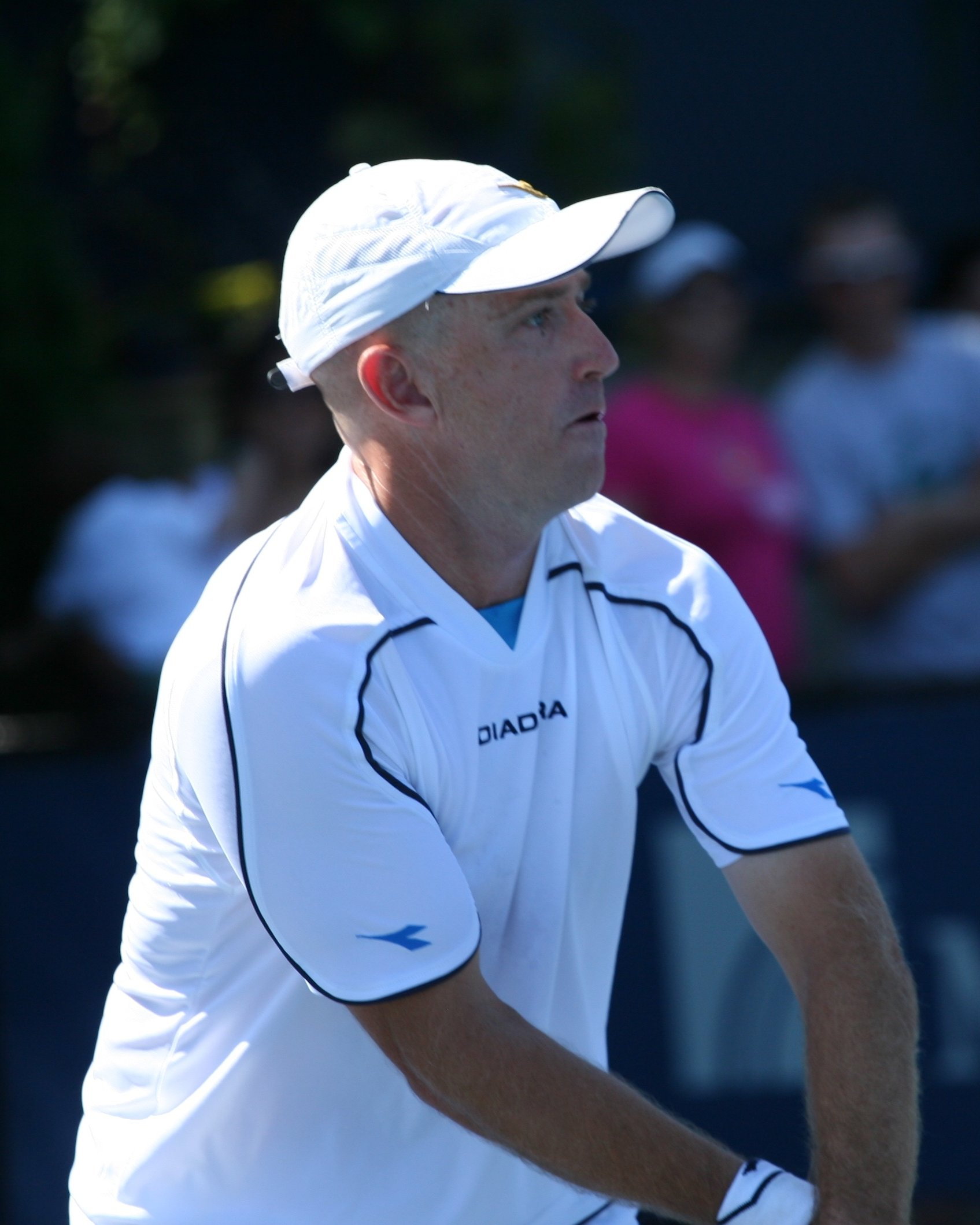
Kevin Ullyett

| Player | W-L (Total) | W-L (Singles) | W-L (Doubles) | Ties | Debut |
|---|---|---|---|---|---|
| Nigel Badza | 1–4 | 0–1 | 1–3 | 5 | 2003 |
| Adrian Bey | 6–8 | 4–5 | 2–3 | 5 | 1963 |
| Malcolm Birch | 4–2 | 0–1 | 4–1 | 6 | 1990 |
| Byron Black | 56–28 | 39–20 | 17–8 | 31 | 1987 |
| Wayne Black | 47–30 | 28–21 | 19–9 | 29 | 1992 |
| Tinotenda Chanakira | 0–2 | 0–0 | 0–2 | 2 | 2007 |
| Genius Chidzikwe | 7–23 | 5–18 | 2–5 | 19 | 1996 |
| Gwinyai Chingoka | 0–2 | 0–1 | 0–1 | 1 | 2003 |
| Stefan D'Almeida | 0–2 | 0–2 | 0–0 | 2 | 2005 |
| Colin Dowdeswell | 2–1 | 2–0 | 0–1 | 1 | 1977 |
| Roger Dowdeswell | 0–3 | 0–2 | 0–1 | 1 | 1965 |
| Mark Fynn | 17-13 | 8-8 | 9-5 | 14 | 2008 |
| Takanyi Garanganga | 6–12 | 5–10 | 1–2 | 16 | 2007 |
| Mark Gurr | 1–3 | 1–2 | 0–1 | 2 | 1987 |
| Rashid Hassan | 1–2 | 1–2 | 0–0 | 2 | 1992 |
| Hank Irvine | 0–3 | 0–3 | 0–0 | 2 | 1968 |
| Haroon Ismail | 12–12 | 8–8 | 4–4 | 10 | 1983 |
| Martin Lock | 1–0 | 0–0 | 1–0 | 1 | 1990 |
| Benjamin Lock | 7–1 | 4–1 | 3–0 | 7 | 2010 |
| Orlando Lourenco | 10–6 | 9–4 | 1–2 | 8 | 1983 |
| Pfungwa Mahefu | 0–2 | 0–2 | 0–0 | 2 | 2005 |
| Graham Martin | 1–0 | 0–0 | 1–0 | 1 | 1988 |
| Andrew Mawire | 4–3 | 1–2 | 3–1 | 4 | 2009 |
| Desmond Mckenzie | 0–2 | 0–2 | 0–0 | 1 | 1977 |
| Admire Mushonga | 3–1 | 0–1 | 3–0 | 4 | 2010 |
| Zibusiso Ncube | 0–2 | 0–2 | 0–0 | 2 | 2003 |
| Mbonisi Ndimande | 6–1 | 3–0 | 3–1 | 4 | 2009 |
| Mlandeli Ndlela | 1–8 | 0–5 | 1–3 | 5 | 2008 |
| Greig Rodger | 11–9 | 7–7 | 4–2 | 9 | 1986 |
| Alan Saloman | 0–1 | 0–0 | 0–1 | 1 | 1969 |
| Frank Saloman | 7–11 | 5–7 | 2–4 | 6 | 1963 |
| Roy Stilwell | 0–3 | 0–2 | 0–1 | 1 | 1965 |
| Garth Thomson | 2–2 | 2–2 | 0–0 | 2 | 1990 |
| Gwinyai Tongoona | 2–8 | 1–5 | 1–3 | 7 | 1994 |
| Sheridan Towers | 0–1 | 0–0 | 0–1 | 1 | 1977 |
| Philip Tuckniss | 9–8 | 5–5 | 4–3 | 8 | 1983 |
| Kevin Ullyett | 11–7 | 3–4 | 8–3 | 12 | 1999 |
| Clive Wilson | 2–0 | 1–0 | 1–0 | 2 | 1986 |
