= 2002 Davis Cup Europe/Africa Zone Group I =

International tennis competition

The Europe/Africa Zone was one of the three zones of the regional Davis Cup competition in 2002.

In the Europe/Africa Zone there were four different tiers, called groups, in which teams competed against each other to advance to the upper tier. Winners in Group I advanced to the World Group qualifying round, along with losing teams from the World Group first round. Teams who lost in the first round competed in the relegation play-offs, with winning teams remaining in Group I, whereas teams who lost their play-offs were relegated to the Europe/Africa Zone Group II in 2003.

== Participating nations ==
- Austria
- Belarus
- Belgium
- Finland
- Greece
- Israel
- Italy
- Portugal
- Romania
- Zimbabwe

=== Draw ===
Second Round Play-offs
Follonica, Italy (indoor carpet)
S	Italy	4
Portugal	1
Ramat HaSharon, Israel (hard)
Israel	5
Greece	0

First Round Play-offs
S	Italy
bye
Minsk, Belarus (indoor carpet)
S	Belarus	4
Portugal	1
Israel
bye
bye
Greece

First Round
S	Italy
bye
Finland
bye
S	Belarus
bye
Harare, Zimbabwe (indoor hard)
Portugal	0
Zimbabwe	5
Tirol, Austria (indoor clay)
Austria	3
Israel	2
bye
S	Romania
bye
Greece
bye
S	Belgium

Second Round
Reggio Calabria, Italy (clay)
S	Italy	1
Finland	4
Harare, Zimbabwe (indoor hard)
S	Belarus	1
Zimbabwe	4
Constanța, Romania (indoor carpet)
Austria	0
S	Romania	5
Liège, Belgium (indoor carpet)
Greece	0
S	Belgium	5

- Greece and Portugal relegated to Group II in 2003.
- Belgium, Finland, Romania, and Zimbabwe advance to World Group qualifying round.

== First round ==
=== Zimbabwe vs. Portugal ===
Zimbabwe
5
City Sports Centre, Harare, Zimbabwe
8–10 February 2002
Hard (indoors)

Portugal
0

			1	2	3	4	5
1	(Zimbabwe) (Portugal)	Byron Black; Emanuel Couto	6; 3	7^{7} 6^{4}	7; 5
2	(Zimbabwe) (Portugal)	Wayne Black; Bernardo Mota	6; 1	3; 6	6; 3	6; 2
3	(Zimbabwe) (Portugal)	Wayne Black / Kevin Ullyett; Emanuel Couto / Nuno Marques	6; 4	6; 4	6; 4
4	(Zimbabwe) (Portugal)	Wayne Black; Hélder Lopes	7^{7} 6^{5}	6; 3
5	(Zimbabwe) (Portugal)	Genius Chidzikwe; Bernardo Mota	3; 6	7^{8} 6^{6}	7; 5

Genius Chidzikwe became the first black Zimbabwean to win a Davis Cup tennis match

=== Austria vs. Israel ===
Austria
3
Tirol, Austria
8–10 February 2002
Clay (indoors)

Israel
2

			1	2	3	4	5
1	(Austria) (Israel)	Stefan Koubek; Amir Hadad	6; 1	6; 3	7^{7} 6^{2}
2	(Austria) (Israel)	Markus Hipfl; Noam Okun	6; 3	4; 6	6; 3	6; 1
3	(Austria) (Israel)	Alexander Peya / Clemens Trimmel; Jonathan Erlich / Andy Ram	6; 2	4; 6	7; 5	6^{5} 7^{7}	2; 6
4	(Austria) (Israel)	Stefan Koubek; Noam Okun	6; 3	7; 5	6; 4
5	(Austria) (Israel)	Markus Hipfl; Amir Hadad	3; 6	0; 3				retired

== Second round ==
=== Italy vs. Finland ===
Italy
1
Rocco Polimeni TC, Reggio Calabria, Italy
5–7 April 2002
Clay

Finland
4

			1	2	3	4	5
1	(Italy) (Finland)	Davide Sanguinetti; Kim Tiilikainen	6; 2	7; 5	3; 6	2; 6	5; 7
2	(Italy) (Finland)	Giorgio Galimberti; Jarkko Nieminen	3; 6	2; 6	2; 6
3	(Italy) (Finland)	Giorgio Galimberti / Mosé Navarra; Lauri Kiiski / Jarkko Nieminen	3; 6	6^{10} 7^{12}	3; 6
4	(Italy) (Finland)	Mosé Navarra; Timo Nieminen	6; 3	7; 5
5	(Italy) (Finland)	Stefano Galvani; Kim Tiilikainen	3; 6	1; 6

=== Zimbabwe vs. Belarus ===
Zimbabwe
4
Harare Sports Centre, Harare, Zimbabwe
5–7 April 2002
Hard (indoors)

Belarus
1

			1	2	3	4	5
1	(Zimbabwe) (Belarus)	Byron Black; Vladimir Voltchkov	6^{4} 7^{7}	3; 6	4; 6
2	(Zimbabwe) (Belarus)	Wayne Black; Max Mirnyi	7^{7} 6^{3}	6; 3	4; 6	6; 4
3	(Zimbabwe) (Belarus)	Wayne Black / Kevin Ullyett; Max Mirnyi / Vladimir Voltchkov	6; 3	7^{7} 6^{4}	4; 6	7^{14} 6^{12}
4	(Zimbabwe) (Belarus)	Byron Black; Max Mirnyi	6; 3	7; 5	6^{3} 7^{7}	6; 3
5	(Zimbabwe) (Belarus)	Genius Chidzikwe; Alexander Skrypko	6; 3	6^{5} 7^{7}	6; 3

=== Romania vs. Austria ===
Romania
5
Urilor Sports Hall, Constanța, Romania
5–7 April 2002
Carpet (indoors)

Austria
0

			1	2	3	4	5
1	(Romania) (Austria)	Andrei Pavel; Jürgen Melzer	6; 1	6; 2	6; 4
2	(Romania) (Austria)	Adrian Voinea; Stefan Koubek	3; 6	7; 5	6; 3	6; 1
3	(Romania) (Austria)	Andrei Pavel / Gabriel Trifu; Julian Knowle / Jürgen Melzer	3; 6	6; 1	6; 4	6^{6} 7^{8}	6; 2
4	(Romania) (Austria)	Andrei Pavel; Alexander Peya	6; 1	7^{11} 6^{9}
5	(Romania) (Austria)	Victor Hănescu; Jürgen Melzer	6; 4	6; 4

=== Belgium vs. Greece ===
Belgium
5
Adeps Country Hall, Liège, Belgium
5–7 April 2002
Carpet (indoors)

Greece
0

			1	2	3	4	5
1	(Belgium) (Greece)	Xavier Malisse; Nikos Rovas	6; 0	7^{7} 6^{4}	6; 0
2	(Belgium) (Greece)	Olivier Rochus; Konstantinos Economidis	7^{7} 6^{4}	6; 3	6; 1
3	(Belgium) (Greece)	Gilles Elseneer / Tom Vanhoudt; Konstantinos Economidis / Anastasios Vasiliadis	6^{4} 7^{7}	7^{7} 6^{4}	7^{7} 6^{1}	6; 4
4	(Belgium) (Greece)	Gilles Elseneer; Anastasios Vasiliadis	6; 2	6; 2
5	(Belgium) (Greece)	Olivier Rochus; Nikos Rovas	7; 5	6; 3

== First round relegation play-offs ==
=== Belarus vs. Portugal ===
Belarus
4
Olympic Training Centre, Minsk, Belarus
12–14 July 2002
Carpet (indoors)

Portugal
1

			1	2	3	4	5
1	(Belarus) (Portugal)	Vladimir Voltchkov; Bernardo Mota	6; 2	6; 1	6; 2
2	(Belarus) (Portugal)	Max Mirnyi; Hélder Lopes	6; 3	6; 3	6; 4
3	(Belarus) (Portugal)	Max Mirnyi / Vladimir Voltchkov; Nuno Marques / Bernardo Mota	6; 3	6; 0	6; 3
4	(Belarus) (Portugal)	Alexander Shvets; Leonardo Tavares	6; 2	7^{7} 6^{4}
5	(Belarus) (Portugal)	Alexander Skrypko; Hélder Lopes	6; 2	3; 6	4; 6

== Second round relegation play-offs ==
=== Italy vs. Portugal ===
Italy
4
Follonica T.C., Follonica, Italy
20–22 September 2002
Carpet (indoors)

Portugal
1

			1	2	3	4	5
1	(Italy) (Portugal)	Stefano Galvani; Bernardo Mota	5; 7	3; 6	6^{2} 7^{7}
2	(Italy) (Portugal)	Davide Sanguinetti; Leonardo Tavares	6; 3	6; 2	6; 1
3	(Italy) (Portugal)	Massimo Bertolini / Giorgio Galimberti; Hélder Lopes / Bernardo Mota	6; 3	6^{4} 7^{7}	6; 3	6; 4
4	(Italy) (Portugal)	Davide Sanguinetti; Bernardo Mota	6; 4	7; 5	6; 4
5	(Italy) (Portugal)	Stefano Galvani; Tiago Godinho	6; 4	6; 1

=== Israel vs. Greece ===
Israel
5
National Centre, Ramat HaSharon, Israel
20–22 September 2002
Hard

Greece
0

			1	2	3	4	5
1	(Israel) (Greece)	Harel Levy; Eleftherios- Spyridon Alexiou	6; 3	6; 1	6; 2
2	(Israel) (Greece)	Noam Okun; Alexandros Jakoubovits	6; 3	6; 4	6; 2
3	(Israel) (Greece)	Jonathan Erlich / Amir Hadad; Alexandros Jakoubovits / Niko Karagiannis	7; 5	6; 4	6; 2
4	(Israel) (Greece)	Amir Hadad; Eleftherios- Spyridon Alexiou	6; 0	6; 0
5	(Israel) (Greece)	Harel Levy; Niko Karagiannis	6; 4	6; 3
