= Giorgi Chantouria =

Georgian tennis player

- Country (sports): Georgia
- Residence: Tbilisi, Georgia
- Born: January 23, 1989 (age 36); Tbilisi, Soviet Union
- Height: 178 cm (5 ft 10 in)
- Turned pro: 2004
- Plays: Left-handed
- Prize money: US$611

Singles
- Career record: 0–2
- Career titles: 0
- Highest ranking: 1456 (November 5, 2007)
- Last updated on: June 20, 2012.

Giorgi Chantouria (Georgian: გიორგი ჭანტურია, romanized: giorgi ch'ant'uria, pronounced [ɡiorɡi tʃʼantʼuria]; born January 23, 1989) is a former tennis player from Georgia, who played on the ITF Futures tournaments and Davis Cup.

In the 2007 Davis Cup he played against future world number one tennis player Novak Djokovic. Djokovic led 6–1, 5–0 when Chantouria retired.
