= Gwinyai Chingoka =

Zimbabwean tennis player (1982–2022)

- Country (sports): Zimbabwe
- Born: 27 September 1982
- Died: 27 January 2022 (aged 39) West End Hospital

Singles
- Career titles: 0

Doubles
- Career record: 0–2
- Career titles: 0
- Davis Cup: 0–2

Coaching career (2011–2022)
- Last updated on: 18 February 2022.

Gwinyai Chingoka (27 September 1982 – 27 January 2022) was a Zimbabwean tennis player who represented Zimbabwe at the Davis Cup. He was known as Shumba in sporting circles due to his stamina and strength while playing tennis. His father Paul Chingoka was a President of the Zimbabwe Olympic Committee and President of Tennis Zimbabwe. His uncle Douglas Chingoka was a basketball player and football player who played as a striker for Dynamos F.C.

== Career ==
Chingoka was introduced to the sport of tennis at a young age by his father and soon rose to prominence at junior level and was also considered as one of the top junior tennis players in Zimbabwe. He reached his highest career ITF junior ranking of 112 in April 2000 and has recorded a winning percentage of 74 in his junior career. Due to his emergence as a junior level tennis player, he received a tennis scholarship from the Southern Methodist University in Texas, United States. He was adjudged as the Western Athletic Conference Freshman of the Year for 2001–02 season for his commendable performances in sports.

He was subsequently named in the Zimbabwean Davis Cup squad for the 2003 Davis Cup. However, he made only one appearance in the team competition at the 2003 Davis Cup Europe/Africa Zone Group I round in a men's doubles match teaming up with Genius Chidzikwe against Israel which eventually ended up in a losing cause. He also featured in one singles match in the tournament but lost it in straight sets to Israel's Jonathan Erlich.

In August 2003, he took part in the Dairibord Zimbabwe Open and reached semi-final round of the tournament after creating a huge upset victory in the quarter-finals over Peter Nyamande who was one of the hot favorites of the tournament. He turned the game on his head and found himself as the top seed in the 2003 Zimbabwe Open with many high-profile local tennis players being absent from the competition owing to various reasons. He also went onto pursue a degree in Economics in the Southern Methodist University in 2001 and graduated from the university in 2005. Once he completed his tennis scholarship in 2005, he returned to his home country Zimbabwe and played tennis for over six years. He later retired from the sport as of late 2011 and then began focusing on coaching junior tennis players. He also worked at Telecel Zimbabwe as a sales representative during his latter part of his life while also being committed as a coach at the Harare Sports Club.

== Death ==
Chingoka sustained severe fractures on his left leg and elbow during a road accident which took place on a late night in Harare on 16 January 2022, when he was on his way home after attending a private function at the Harare Sports Club. It was reported that he was hit by a car which was driven by Zimbabwean cricketer Tarisai Musakanda. It was also later revealed that Musakanda had immediately stopped his car at the scene of the accident and had rushed to the West End Hospital taking injured Chingoka in his car. Chingoka died on 27 January 2022, after spending 10 days in the Intensive Care Unit at the age of 39 and the post-mortem report ruled that the road accident was the root cause for his death. Musakanda was later charged with culpable homicide and for failure to report the accident to the police preceding 24 hours of the incident.

== See also ==
- List of Zimbabwe Davis Cup team representatives
