= 2003 Davis Cup Europe/Africa Zone Group I =

International tennis competition

The European and African Zone was one of the three zones of regional Davis Cup competition in 2003.

In the Europe/Africa Zone there were four different tiers, called groups, in which teams competed against each other to advance to the upper tier. Winners in Group I advanced to the World Group play-offs, along with losing teams from the World Group first round. Teams who lost their respective ties competed in the relegation play-offs, with winning teams remaining in Group I, whereas teams who lost their play-offs were relegated to the Europe/Africa Zone Group II in 2004.

== Participating teams ==
Seeds:

1. Slovakia
2. Morocco
3. Zimbabwe
4. Finland

Remaining nations:

- Austria
- Belarus
- Israel
- Italy
- Luxembourg
- Norway

== Draw ==
Second Round Play-offs
Asker, Norway (clay)
Luxembourg	5
Norway	0
Harare, Zimbabwe (hard)
3	Zimbabwe	3
Italy	2

First Round Play-offs
Luxembourg
bye
Asker, Norway (clay)
4	Finland	4
Norway	1
Ramat Hasharon, Israel (hard)
Israel	5
3	Zimbabwe	0
bye
Italy

First Round
1	Slovakia
bye
Luxembourg
bye
4	Finland
bye
Oslo, Norway (indoor hard)
Austria	5
Norway	0
Minsk, Belarus (carpet)
Belarus	3
Israel	2
bye
3	Zimbabwe
bye
Italy
bye
2	Morocco

Second Round
Esch-sur-Alzette, Lux. (indoor hard)
1	Slovakia	3
Luxembourg	2
St. Anton, Austria (carpet)
4	Finland	2
Austria	3
Minsk, Belarus (carpet)
Belarus	4
3	Zimbabwe	1
Marrakesh, Morocco (clay)
Italy	2
2	Morocco	3

- Norway and Italy relegated to Group II in 2004.
- Slovakia, Austria, Belarus, and Morocco advance to World Group Play-off.

== First Round Matches ==
=== Norway vs. Austria ===
Norway
0
Riksanlegget, Oslo, Norway
7–9 February 2003
Hard (indoor)

Austria
5

			1	2	3	4	5
1	(Norway) (Austria)	Stian Boretti; Jürgen Melzer	2; 6	2; 6	1; 6
2	(Norway) (Austria)	Jan Frode Andersen; Alexander Peya	3; 6	3; 6	5; 7
3	(Norway) (Austria)	Jan Frode Andersen / Stian Boretti; Jürgen Melzer / Alexander Peya	3; 6	2; 6	7^{7} 6^{4}	6; 4	5; 7
4	(Norway) (Austria)	Fredrik Aarum; Oliver Marach	4; 6	2; 6
5	(Norway) (Austria)	Stian Boretti; Konstantin Gruber	3; 6	5; 7

=== Belarus vs. Israel ===
Belarus
3
Olympic Training Centre, Minsk, Belarus
7–9 February 2003
Carpet (indoor)

Israel
2

			1	2	3	4	5
1	(Belarus) (Israel)	Max Mirnyi; Harel Levy	6; 1	6^{2} 7^{7}	6; 3	7^{8} 6^{6}
2	(Belarus) (Israel)	Vladimir Voltchkov; Noam Okun	6; 2	7^{7} 6^{5}	6; 3
3	(Belarus) (Israel)	Max Mirnyi / Vladimir Voltchkov; Jonathan Erlich / Andy Ram	7^{7} 6^{2}	6; 4	6; 4
4	(Belarus) (Israel)	Alexander Shvets; Andy Ram	1; 6	2; 3				retired
5	(Belarus) (Israel)	Alexander Skrypko; Harel Levy	4; 6	4; 6

== Second Round Matches ==
=== Luxembourg vs. Slovakia ===
Luxembourg
2
National Tennis Centre (CNT), Esch-sur-Alzette, Luxembourg
4–6 April 2003
Hard (indoor)

Slovakia
3

			1	2	3	4	5
1	(Luxembourg) (Slovakia)	Gilles Müller; Michal Mertiňák	7; 5	6; 3	7^{8} 6^{6}
2	(Luxembourg) (Slovakia)	Gilles Kremer; Karol Beck	3; 6	4; 6	2; 6
3	(Luxembourg) (Slovakia)	Gilles Müller / Mike Scheidweiler; Karol Beck / Igor Zelenay	7; 5	7; 5	6; 4
4	(Luxembourg) (Slovakia)	Gilles Müller; Karol Beck	4; 6	3; 6	3; 6
5	(Luxembourg) (Slovakia)	Mike Scheidweiler; Michal Mertiňák	6; 4	3; 6	2; 6	4; 6

=== Austria vs. Finland ===
Austria
3
Arlberg-well.com Halle, St. Anton, Austria
4–6 April 2003
Carpet (indoor)

Finland
2

			1	2	3	4	5
1	(Austria) (Finland)	Stefan Koubek; Tuomas Ketola	7; 5	4; 6	7^{7} 6^{3}	6; 1
2	(Austria) (Finland)	Jürgen Melzer; Jarkko Nieminen	6^{5} 7^{7}	6; 4	4; 6	6; 4	4; 6
3	(Austria) (Finland)	Julian Knowle / Alexander Peya; Tuomas Ketola / Jarkko Nieminen	2; 6	6; 4	7^{7} 6^{4}	7; 5
4	(Austria) (Finland)	Stefan Koubek; Jarkko Nieminen	3; 6	2; 6	3; 6
5	(Austria) (Finland)	Jürgen Melzer; Tuomas Ketola	7^{7} 6^{2}	3; 6	6^{6} 7^{8}	6; 2	6; 2

=== Belarus vs. Zimbabwe ===
Belarus
4
Olympic Training Centre, Minsk, Belarus
4–6 April 2003
Carpet (indoor)

Zimbabwe
1

			1	2	3	4	5
1	(Belarus) (Zimbabwe)	Max Mirnyi; Kevin Ullyett	6; 3	7^{7} 6^{4}	6; 4
2	(Belarus) (Zimbabwe)	Vladimir Voltchkov; Wayne Black	6^{4} 7^{7}	6; 4	6; 2	7; 5
3	(Belarus) (Zimbabwe)	Max Mirnyi / Vladimir Voltchkov; Wayne Black / Kevin Ullyett	5; 7	6; 3	7; 5	7^{7} 6^{4}
4	(Belarus) (Zimbabwe)	Alexander Skrypko; Wayne Black	6; 3	6; 3
5	(Belarus) (Zimbabwe)	Vladimir Voltchkov; Gwinyai Tongoona	6; 1	1; 2				retired

=== Morocco vs. Italy ===
Morocco
3
Royal Tennis Club, Marrakesh, Morocco
4–6 April 2003
Clay

Italy
2

			1	2	3	4	5
1	(Morocco) (Italy)	Younes El Aynaoui; Filippo Volandri	7^{8} 6^{6}	6; 4	3; 6	7^{7} 6^{5}
2	(Morocco) (Italy)	Hicham Arazi; Davide Sanguinetti	5; 7	6; 1	6; 0	4; 6	3; 6
3	(Morocco) (Italy)	Mounir El Aarej / Younes El Aynaoui; Massimo Bertolini / Giorgio Galimberti	1; 6	4; 6	1; 6
4	(Morocco) (Italy)	Younes El Aynaoui; Davide Sanguinetti	6; 4	6; 3	6; 2
5	(Morocco) (Italy)	Hicham Arazi; Filippo Volandri	6; 3	6; 3	6; 2

== First Round Play-offs Matches ==
=== Norway vs. Finland ===
Norway
1
Asker Tennis Club, Asker, Norway
11–13 July 2003
Clay

Finland
4

			1	2	3	4	5
1	(Norway) (Finland)	Stian Boretti; Jarkko Nieminen	1; 6	1; 5				retired
2	(Norway) (Finland)	Jan Frode Andersen; Janne Ojala	4; 6	6; 3	7^{7} 6^{3}	7; 5
3	(Norway) (Finland)	Jan Frode Andersen / Stian Boretti; Tuomas Ketola / Jarkko Nieminen	5; 7	4; 6	4; 6
4	(Norway) (Finland)	Jan Frode Andersen; Jarkko Nieminen	2; 6	2; 6	4; 6
5	(Norway) (Finland)	Thomas Haug; Kim Tiilikainen	1; 6	3; 6

=== Israel vs. Zimbabwe ===
Israel
5
Canada Stadium, Ramat HaSharon, Israel
11–13 July 2003
Hard

Zimbabwe
0

			1	2	3	4	5
1	(Israel) (Zimbabwe)	Noam Okun; Gwinyai Tongoona	6; 4	6; 3	6; 4
2	(Israel) (Zimbabwe)	Harel Levy; Genius Chidzikwe	6; 2	6; 4	6; 4
3	(Israel) (Zimbabwe)	Jonathan Erlich / Andy Ram; Genius Chidzikwe / Gwinyai Chingoka	7; 5	6; 4	6; 4
4	(Israel) (Zimbabwe)	Noam Okun; Zibusiso Ncube	6; 4	7^{7} 6^{3}
5	(Israel) (Zimbabwe)	Jonathan Erlich; Gwinyai Chingoka	6; 4	6; 0

== Second Round Play-offs Matches ==
=== Norway vs. Luxembourg ===
Norway
0
Asker Tennis Club, Asker, Norway
19–21 September 2003
Clay

Luxembourg
5

			1	2	3	4	5
1	(Norway) (Luxembourg)	Stian Boretti; Gilles Müller	3; 6	6^{3} 7^{7}	6; 2	3; 6
2	(Norway) (Luxembourg)	Jan Frode Andersen; Mike Scheidweiler	4; 6	4; 6	6^{4} 7^{7}
3	(Norway) (Luxembourg)	Jan Frode Andersen / Stian Boretti; Gilles Müller / Mike Scheidweiler	1; 6	6; 4	6; 3	3; 6	4; 6
4	(Norway) (Luxembourg)	Helge Koll-Frafjord; Gilles Kremer	4; 6					retired
5	(Norway) (Luxembourg)	Erling Tveit; Laurent Hild	3; 6	7^{7} 6^{5}	3; 6

=== Zimbabwe vs. Italy ===
Zimbabwe
3
Harare City Sports Centre, Harare, Zimbabwe
19–21 September 2003
Hard

Italy
2

			1	2	3	4	5
1	(Zimbabwe) (Italy)	Kevin Ullyett; Filippo Volandri	4; 6	7; 5	6; 3	7^{7} 6^{5}
2	(Zimbabwe) (Italy)	Wayne Black; Davide Sanguinetti	7^{7} 6^{2}	6; 1	6; 3
3	(Zimbabwe) (Italy)	Wayne Black / Kevin Ullyett; Massimo Bertolini / Giorgio Galimberti	7^{9} 6^{7}	6; 2	6; 4
4	(Zimbabwe) (Italy)	Genius Chidzikwe; Giorgio Galimberti	2; 6	2; 6
5	(Zimbabwe) (Italy)	Nigel Badza; Davide Sanguinetti	1; 6	1; 6
