= 2005 Davis Cup Europe/Africa Zone Group I =

International tennis competition

The European and African Zone was one of the three zones of regional Davis Cup competition in 2005.

In the European and African Zone there were four different groups in which teams competed against each other to advance to the next group.

== Participating teams ==
- Belgium
- Germany
- Great Britain
- Israel
- Italy
- Luxembourg
- Morocco
- Serbia and Montenegro
- South Africa
- Zimbabwe

== Draw ==
Second Round Play-offs
Harare, Zimbabwe (indoor hard)
Israel	4
Zimbabwe	1
Khemisset, Morocco (clay)
S	Morocco	4
South Africa	1

First Round Play-offs
Israel
bye
bye
Zimbabwe
Esch/Alzette, Luxembourg (indoor hard)
Luxembourg	3
S	Morocco	2
South Africa
bye

First round
S	Great Britain
bye
Israel
bye
S	Belgium
bye
Novi Sad, Serbia and Montenegro (indoor clay)
Serbia and Montenegro	5
Zimbabwe	0
Luxembourg City, Lux. (indoor hard)
Italy	5
Luxembourg	0
bye
S	Morocco
bye
South Africa
bye
S	Germany

Second round
Ramat Hasharon, Israel (hard)
S	Great Britain	3
Israel	2
Belgrade, Serbia and Montenegro (clay)
S	Belgium	3
Serbia and Montenegro	2
Rome, Italy (clay)
Italy	4
S	Morocco	1
Doornfontein, South Africa (indoor hard)
South Africa	2
S	Germany	3

- Zimbabwe and South Africa relegated to Group II in 2006.
- Great Britain, Belgium, Italy, and Germany advance to World Group Play-off.

== First Round Matches ==
=== Serbia and Montenegro vs. Zimbabwe ===
Serbia and Montenegro
5
Novosadski Sajam Hala, Novi Sad, Serbia and Montenegro
4–6 March 2005
Clay (indoor)

Zimbabwe
0

			1	2	3	4	5
1	(Serbia and Montenegro) (Zimbabwe)	Novak Djokovic; Genius Chidzikwe	6; 4	6; 0	6; 4
2	(Serbia and Montenegro) (Zimbabwe)	Janko Tipsarević; Gwinyai Tongoona	6; 3	6; 2	6; 1
3	(Serbia and Montenegro) (Zimbabwe)	Dušan Vemić / Nenad Zimonjić; Genius Chidzikwe / Gwinyai Tongoona	7^{7} 6^{3}	6; 0	6; 3
4	(Serbia and Montenegro) (Zimbabwe)	Janko Tipsarević; Zibusiso Ncube	6; 0	6; 2
5	(Serbia and Montenegro) (Zimbabwe)	Novak Djokovic; Pfungwa Mahefu	6; 1	6; 2

=== Italy vs. Luxembourg ===
Italy
5
Centre National Sportif et Culturel D'Coque, Luxembourg City, Luxembourg
4–6 March 2005
Hard (indoor)

Luxembourg
0

			1	2	3	4	5
1	(Italy) (Luxembourg)	Daniele Bracciali; Gilles Müller	7^{7} 6^{4}	6^{4} 7^{7}	6; 4	6; 4
2	(Italy) (Luxembourg)	Potito Starace; Mike Scheidweiler	6; 3	6; 1	6; 2
3	(Italy) (Luxembourg)	Daniele Bracciali / Giorgio Galimberti; Gilles Müller / Mike Scheidweiler	6; 4	6; 4	6^{6} 7^{8}	7; 5
4	(Italy) (Luxembourg)	Potito Starace; Gilles Kremer	6; 4	6; 2
5	(Italy) (Luxembourg)	Andreas Seppi; Laurent Bram	7^{7} 6^{4}	6; 3

== Second Round Matches ==
=== Great Britain vs. Israel ===
Great Britain
3
Canada Stadium, Ramat HaSharon, Israel
4–6 March 2005
Hard

Israel
2

			1	2	3	4	5
1	(United Kingdom) (Israel)	Greg Rusedski; Harel Levy	6; 4	6; 3	6; 0
2	(United Kingdom) (Israel)	Alex Bogdanović; Noam Okun	6^{3} 7^{7}	2; 6	2; 6
3	(United Kingdom) (Israel)	Andy Murray / David Sherwood; Jonathan Erlich / Andy Ram	6; 4	7^{7} 6^{5}	2; 6	7^{7} 6^{5}
4	(United Kingdom) (Israel)	Greg Rusedski; Noam Okun	6; 3	6; 4	6; 2
5	(United Kingdom) (Israel)	David Sherwood; Harel Levy	7^{7} 6^{1}	4; 6	3; 6

=== Belgium vs. Serbia and Montenegro ===
Belgium
3
Tennis Club Gemax, Belgrade, Serbia and Montenegro
29 April – 1 May 2005
Clay

Serbia and Montenegro
2

			1	2	3	4	5
1	(Belgium) (Serbia and Montenegro)	Christophe Rochus; Janko Tipsarević	6; 2	6; 4	5; 7	4; 6	1; 6
2	(Belgium) (Serbia and Montenegro)	Olivier Rochus; Novak Djokovic	1; 6	7; 5	6^{3} 7^{7}	6; 1	6; 3
3	(Belgium) (Serbia and Montenegro)	Dick Norman / Kristof Vliegen; Dušan Vemić / Nenad Zimonjić	6; 3	6; 4	3; 6	6; 4
4	(Belgium) (Serbia and Montenegro)	Olivier Rochus; Janko Tipsarević	7^{10} 6^{8}	6; 3	6^{3} 7^{7}	2; 6	4; 6
5	(Belgium) (Serbia and Montenegro)	Kristof Vliegen; Novak Djokovic	6; 3	6; 3	3; 6	6; 2

=== Italy vs. Morocco ===
Italy
4
Foro Italico, Rome, Italy
28–30 April 2005
Clay

Morocco
1

			1	2	3	4	5
1	(Italy) (Morocco)	Potito Starace; Mounir El Aarej	6; 0	3; 6	7; 5	6; 0
2	(Italy) (Morocco)	Filippo Volandri; Younes El Aynaoui	6; 2	6; 4	6; 1
3	(Italy) (Morocco)	Daniele Bracciali / Giorgio Galimberti; Younes El Aynaoui / Mehdi Tahiri	7; 5	6; 1	6; 2
4	(Italy) (Morocco)	Filippo Volandri; Mounir El Aarej	3; 6	6; 1	1; 6
5	(Italy) (Morocco)	Potito Starace; Mehdi Tahiri	6; 1	3; 6	6; 4

=== South Africa vs. Germany ===
South Africa
2
Ellis Park Tennis Stadium, Doornfontein, South Africa
4–6 March 2005
Hard (indoor)

Germany
3

			1	2	3	4	5
1	(South Africa) (Germany)	Wesley Moodie; Nicolas Kiefer	6; 4	7^{7} 6^{3}	6^{4} 7^{7}	3; 6	2; 6
2	(South Africa) (Germany)	Wayne Ferreira; Tommy Haas	3; 6	0; 6	6^{3} 7^{7}
3	(South Africa) (Germany)	Jeff Coetzee / Wesley Moodie; Nicolas Kiefer / Rainer Schüttler	6; 3	7^{7} 6^{4}	7; 5
4	(South Africa) (Germany)	Wesley Moodie; Tommy Haas	6^{5} 7^{7}	6; 2	4; 6	6; 3	10; 8
5	(South Africa) (Germany)	Wayne Ferreira; Rainer Schüttler	1; 6	2; 6	4; 6

== First Round Play-offs Matches ==
=== Luxembourg vs. Morocco ===
Luxembourg
3
National Tennis Centre, Esch-sur-Alzette, Luxembourg
15–17 July 2005
Hard (indoor)

Morocco
2

			1	2	3	4	5
1	(Luxembourg) (Morocco)	Gilles Müller; Mehdi Tahiri	7^{11} 6^{9}	4; 6	6^{1} 7^{7}	7^{7} 6^{2}	4; 6
2	(Luxembourg) (Morocco)	Gilles Kremer; Mounir El Aarej	6; 3	7; 5	6; 4
3	(Luxembourg) (Morocco)	Gilles Müller / Mike Scheidweiler; Mounir El Aarej / Mehdi Tahiri	6; 0	6; 4	5; 7	7^{7} 6^{2}
4	(Luxembourg) (Morocco)	Gilles Müller; Mounir El Aarej	6; 3	6; 4	6^{4} 7^{7}	6; 3
5	(Luxembourg) (Morocco)	Laurent Bram; Mehdi Tahiri	5; 7	4; 6

== Second Round Play-offs Matches ==
=== Israel vs. Zimbabwe ===
Israel
4
Harare City Sports Centre, Harare, Zimbabwe
23–25 September 2005
Hard (indoor)

Zimbabwe
1

			1	2	3	4	5
1	(Israel) (Zimbabwe)	Dudi Sela; Wayne Black	1; 6	6^{4} 7^{7}	7^{7} 6^{2}	3; 6
2	(Israel) (Zimbabwe)	Noam Okun; Genius Chidzikwe	6; 2	7^{7} 6^{3}	6; 3
3	(Israel) (Zimbabwe)	Jonathan Erlich / Andy Ram; Wayne Black / Gwinyai Tongoona	6; 2	6; 3	6; 3
4	(Israel) (Zimbabwe)	Dudi Sela; Genius Chidzikwe	6; 4	6; 4	6; 3
5	(Israel) (Zimbabwe)	Noam Okun; Stefan D'Almeida	6; 0	6; 2

=== Morocco vs. South Africa ===
Morocco
4
Club Olympic de Tennis Khemisset, Khemisset, Morocco
23–25 September 2005
Clay

South Africa
1

			1	2	3	4	5
1	(Morocco) (South Africa)	Mounir El Aarej; Justin Bower	6; 4	6; 4	3; 6	4; 6	8; 6
2	(Morocco) (South Africa)	Mehdi Tahiri; Rik De Voest	2; 6	6; 2	6; 4	4; 6	6; 2
3	(Morocco) (South Africa)	Talal Ouahabi / Mehdi Ziadi; Jeff Coetzee / Chris Haggard	6^{4} 7^{7}	7^{7} 6^{2}	6; 4	3; 6	5; 7
4	(Morocco) (South Africa)	Mounir El Aarej; Rik De Voest	6; 3	6; 4	7; 5
5	(Morocco) (South Africa)	Mehdi Tahiri; Justin Bower	7; 5	7^{7} 6^{2}
