= 2007 Davis Cup Europe/Africa Zone Group I =

International tennis competition

The European and African Zone is one of the three zones of regional Davis Cup competition in 2007.

In the European and African Zone there are four different groups in which teams compete against each other to advance to the next group.

== Participating teams ==
- Georgia
- Great Britain
- Israel
- Italy
- Luxembourg
- Macedonia
- Netherlands
- Portugal
- Serbia
- Slovakia

== Draw ==
Second Round Play-offs
Esch-sur-Alzette, Lux. (ind. hard)
Macedonia	3
Luxembourg	2
Rotterdam, Netherlands (indoor hard)
Portugal	0
S	Netherlands	5

First Round Play-offs
bye
Macedonia
Alghero, Italy (hard)
S	Italy	4
Luxembourg	1
Portugal
bye
bye
S	Netherlands

First Round
S	Slovakia
bye
Macedonia
bye
S	Italy
bye
Ramat HaSharon, Israel (hard)
Israel	5
Luxembourg	0
Tbilisi, Georgia (indoor carpet)
Georgia	3
Portugal	2
bye
S	Serbia
bye
Great Britain
bye
S	Netherlands

Second Round
Skopje, Macedonia (clay)
S	Slovakia	5
Macedonia	0
Ramat HaSharon, Israel (hard)
S	Italy	2
Israel	3
Belgrade, Serbia (indoor clay)
Georgia	0
S	Serbia	5
Birmingham, England (indoor hard)
Great Britain	4
S	Netherlands	1

- Luxembourg and Portugal relegated to Group II in 2008.
- Slovakia, Israel, Serbia, and Great Britain advance to World Group Play-off.

== First Round Matches ==
=== Israel vs. Luxembourg ===
Israel
5
Canada Stadium, Ramat HaSharon, Israel
9–11 February 2007
Hard

Luxembourg
0

			1	2	3	4	5
1	(Israel) (Luxembourg)	Noam Okun; Gilles Kremer	6; 0	6; 0	6; 1
2	(Israel) (Luxembourg)	Dudi Sela; Gilles Müller	4; 6	6; 4	6; 2	7^{7} 6^{1}
3	(Israel) (Luxembourg)	Jonathan Erlich / Andy Ram; Laurent Bram / Mike Scheidweiler	7^{7} 6^{5}	6; 0	6; 3
4	(Israel) (Luxembourg)	Andy Ram; Laurent Bram	6; 2	5; 7	6; 4
5	(Israel) (Luxembourg)	Dudi Sela; Gilles Kremer	6; 4	7; 5

=== Georgia vs. Portugal ===
Georgia
3
Tbilisi Sports Palace, Tbilisi, Georgia
9–11 February 2007
Carpet (indoor)

Portugal
2

			1	2	3	4	5
1	(Georgia (country)) (Portugal)	Irakli Labadze; Rui Machado	7; 5	6; 3	7^{7} 6^{3}
2	(Georgia (country)) (Portugal)	Lado Chikhladze; Frederico Gil	6; 3	7^{7} 6^{2}	6^{3} 7^{7}	6; 4
3	(Georgia (country)) (Portugal)	Lado Chikhladze / Irakli Labadze; Gastão Elias / Frederico Gil	7^{8} 6^{6}	6^{7} 7^{9}	7^{7} 6^{4}	5; 7	6; 3
4	(Georgia (country)) (Portugal)	George Chantouria; Pedro Sousa	2; 6	4; 6
5	(Georgia (country)) (Portugal)	George Khrikadze; Gastão Elias	3; 6	6^{5} 7^{7}

== Second Round Matches ==
=== Slovakia vs. Macedonia ===
Slovakia
5
Tennis Club JUG, Skopje, Macedonia
6–8 April 2007
clay (outdoor)

Macedonia
0

			1	2	3	4	5
1	(Slovakia) (North Macedonia)	Michal Mertiňák; Lazar Magdinčev	6; 3	6; 2	4; 6	6; 4
2	(Slovakia) (North Macedonia)	Dominik Hrbatý; Predrag Rusevski	6; 2	6; 3	6; 3
3	(Slovakia) (North Macedonia)	Dominik Hrbatý / Michal Mertiňák; Lazar Magdinčev / Predrag Rusevski	6; 2	6; 1	6; 2
4	(Slovakia) (North Macedonia)	Pavol Červenák; Ilija Martinoski	6; 3	6; 4
5	(Slovakia) (North Macedonia)	Ivo Klec; Dimitar Grabuloski	6; 2	6; 3

=== Israel vs. Italy ===
Israel
3
Canada Stadium, Ramat HaSharon, Israel
6–8 April 2007
Hard

Italy
2

			1	2	3	4	5
1	(Israel) (Italy)	Dudi Sela; Andreas Seppi	6; 3	7; 5	1; 6	3; 6	6; 3
2	(Israel) (Italy)	Noam Okun; Simone Bolelli	7; 5	7; 5	6; 4
3	(Israel) (Italy)	Jonathan Erlich / Andy Ram; Daniele Bracciali / Potito Starace	6; 3	7^{7} 6^{4}	7^{7} 6^{5}
4	(Israel) (Italy)	Noam Okun; Andreas Seppi	6^{4} 7^{7}	6^{1} 7^{7}
5	(Israel) (Italy)	Dudi Sela; Simone Bolelli	5; 7	3; 6

=== Serbia vs. Georgia ===
Serbia
5
Sportski Centar Kovilovo, Belgrade, Serbia
6–8 April 2007
Clay (indoor)

Georgia
0

			1	2	3	4	5
1	(Serbia) (Georgia (country))	Novak Djokovic; George Chantouria	6; 1	5; 0				retired
2	(Serbia) (Georgia (country))	Janko Tipsarević; Lado Chikhladze	6; 4	6; 4	7; 5
3	(Serbia) (Georgia (country))	Ilija Bozoljac / Nenad Zimonjić; Lado Chikhladze / George Khrikadze	7; 5	6; 4	6; 3
4	(Serbia) (Georgia (country))	Ilija Bozoljac; Lado Chikhladze	4; 6	6; 3	7^{8} 6^{6}
5	(Serbia) (Georgia (country))	Janko Tipsarević; George Khrikadze	6; 0	6; 1

=== Great Britain vs. Netherlands ===
Great Britain
4
National Exhibition Centre, Birmingham, Great Britain
6–8 April 2007
hard (indoor)

Netherlands
1

			1	2	3	4	5
1	(United Kingdom) (Netherlands)	Andy Murray; Raemon Sluiter	6; 3	7; 5	6; 2
2	(United Kingdom) (Netherlands)	Tim Henman; Robin Haase	7^{7} 6^{4}	6; 3	7^{7} 6^{4}
3	(United Kingdom) (Netherlands)	Jamie Murray / Greg Rusedski; Robin Haase / Rogier Wassen	6; 1	3; 6	6; 3	7^{7} 6^{5}
4	(United Kingdom) (Netherlands)	Jamie Murray; Robin Haase	6; 4	6^{0} 7^{7}	2; 6
5	(United Kingdom) (Netherlands)	Tim Henman; Igor Sijsling	6; 2	6; 3

== First Round Play-offs Matches ==
=== Italy vs. Luxembourg ===
Italy
4
Tennis Club Alghero, Alghero, Italy
20–22 July 2007
Hard

Luxembourg
1

			1	2	3	4	5
1	(Italy) (Luxembourg)	Potito Starace; Laurent Bram	6; 1	6; 3	6; 4
2	(Italy) (Luxembourg)	Andreas Seppi; Gilles Müller	6; 1	6; 1	6; 4
3	(Italy) (Luxembourg)	Daniele Bracciali / Potito Starace; Gilles Müller / Mike Scheidweiler	3; 6	6; 1	4; 6	6; 4	6; 3
4	(Italy) (Luxembourg)	Daniele Bracciali; Gilles Kremer	3; 6					retired
5	(Italy) (Luxembourg)	Federico Luzzi; Laurent Bram	6; 4	6; 4

== Second Round Play-offs Matches ==
=== Macedonia vs. Luxembourg ===
Macedonia
3
National Tennis Centre (CNT), Esch-sur-Alzette, Luxembourg
21–23 September 2007
Hard (indoor)

Luxembourg
2

			1	2	3	4	5
1	(North Macedonia) (Luxembourg)	Lazar Magdinčev; Gilles Müller	2; 6	7^{7} 6^{4}	6; 3	1; 6	6; 3
2	(North Macedonia) (Luxembourg)	Predrag Rusevski; Gilles Kremer	6; 4	3; 6	6; 3	5; 7	6; 4
3	(North Macedonia) (Luxembourg)	Lazar Magdinčev / Predrag Rusevski; Gilles Müller / Mike Scheidweiler	7^{7} 6^{4}	4; 6	7; 5	2; 6	3; 6
4	(North Macedonia) (Luxembourg)	Ilija Martinoski; Gilles Müller	3; 6	4; 6	3; 6
5	(North Macedonia) (Luxembourg)	Lazar Magdinčev; Gilles Kremer	6; 1	6; 3	6^{1} 7^{7}	6^{3} 7^{7}	6; 4

=== Netherlands vs. Portugal ===
Netherlands
5
Ahoy, Rotterdam, Netherlands
21–23 September 2007
Hard (indoor)

Portugal
0

			1	2	3	4	5
1	(Netherlands) (Portugal)	Raemon Sluiter; Frederico Gil	6; 2	6; 1	6; 3
2	(Netherlands) (Portugal)	Robin Haase; Gastão Elias	6; 1	6; 1	2; 6	5; 7	6; 2
3	(Netherlands) (Portugal)	Jesse Huta Galung / Peter Wessels; Gastão Elias / Frederico Gil	6; 2	6^{5} 7^{7}	7^{7} 6^{5}	6; 3
4	(Netherlands) (Portugal)	Robin Haase; Frederico Gil	6; 3	6; 4
5	(Netherlands) (Portugal)	Jesse Huta Galung; Rui Machado	6; 3	3; 6	6; 2
