= Pfungwa Mahefu =

Zimbabwean tennis player (born 1982)

- Country (sports): Zimbabwe
- Born: August 4, 1982 (age 42)
- Turned pro: 2003
- Plays: Right-handed

Singles
- Career record: 0–2
- Career titles: 0
- Last updated on: June 20, 2012.

Pfungwa Mahefu (born August 4, 1982) is a former Zimbabwean tennis player, who played mainly on the ITF Futures tournaments.

In the 2005 Davis Cup he played against future world number one tennis player 17-year-old Novak Djokovic and lost 1–6, 2–6.
