= Genci Cakciri =

Albanian tennis player (born 1982)

- Country (sports): Albania
- Born: May 26, 1982 (age 43); Albania
- Prize money: US $0

Singles
- Career record: 0–0 (ATP World Tour and Grand Slam main draw matches) 0–1 (Davis Cup matches); 0-0 (ATP Challenger Tour main draw and qualifying matches) 0-0 (ITF Men's Circuit main draw matches
- Highest ranking: No Ranking
- Current ranking: No Ranking

Grand Slam singles results
- Australian Open: A
- French Open: A
- Wimbledon: A
- US Open: A

Doubles
- Career record: 0–0 (ATP World Tour and Grand Slam main draw matches) 0–4 (Davis Cup matches); 0-0 (ATP Challenger Tour main draw and qualifying matches) 0-0 (ITF Men's Circuit main draw matches
- Highest ranking: No Ranking

Grand Slam doubles results
- Australian Open: A
- French Open: A
- Wimbledon: A
- US Open: A
- Last updated on: 26 November 2012.

Genci Cakciri (born May 26, 1982, Tirana, Albania) is an Albanian tennis player.

== As a player ==
Cakciri won the National Tennis Championships of Albania for 4 successive years, in 2003 through 2006.

Cakciri competed in the 2007 Summer Universiade in Bangkok, Thailand, losing in the third round to Russian Pavel Chekhov.

Cakciri was also part of inaugural Albania Davis Cup team, formed in 2010, but has not played on it since.

== As a coach ==
As of January, 2005, Cakciri was the Albanian national junior head coach.
