= Hélder Lopes (tennis) =

Portuguese tennis player (born 1977)

- Country (sports): Portugal
- Born: 7 August 1977 (age 47); Vila Nova de Gaia, Portugal
- Plays: Right-handed
- Prize money: $18,783

Singles
- Career record: 2–4
- Career titles: 0
- Highest ranking: 455 (4 August 2003)

Doubles
- Career record: 0–4
- Career titles: 0
- Highest ranking: 373 (4 November 2002)
- Last updated on: N/A.

Hélder Lopes (born 7 August 1977) is a Portuguese former professional tennis player who competed in the ITF Men's Circuit. He achieved his highest singles ranking of 455 in the world by the Association of Tennis Professionals (ATP) in August 2003. Though he played almost his entire career in the minor circuits, Lopes did play singles and doubles events at the Estoril Open between 2000 and 2003. He also entered five Davis Cup ties in 2002 and 2003.

== Career finals ==
=== ITF Men's Circuit ===
==== Singles: 4 (1 title, 3 runner-ups) ====
Category Futures (0–2) Satellites (1–1)	Surface Hard (0–1) Clay (1–2) Grass (0–0) Carpet (0–0)	Setting Outdoors (1–3) Indoors (0–0)

Result	Date	Category	Tournament	Surface	Opponent	Score
Runner-up	1 – 28 October 2001	Satellites	Espinho, Portugal 3	Hard	(Belgium) Dominique Coene	6–7^{(7–9)}, 4–6
Winner	15 July – 11 August 2002	Satellites	Miramar, Portugal 2	Clay	(Spain) Raul Morant-Rivas	7–6^{(7–4)}, 7–6^{(7–5)}
Runner-up	9 February 2003	Futures	Espinho, Portugal F1	Hard	(Luxembourg) Mike Scheidweiler	6–7^{(6–8)}, 4–6
Runner-up	22 June 2003	Futures	Lisbon, Portugal F9	Clay	(Spain) Nicolás Almagro	4–6, 6–4, 3–6

==== Doubles: 8 (4 titles, 4 runner-ups) ====
Legend Futures (0–1) Satellites (4–3)	Titles by surface Hard (0–2) Clay (4–2) Grass (0–0) Carpet (0–0)	Titles by setting Outdoors (4–4) Indoors (0–0)

Result	Date	Category	Tournament	Surface	Partner	Opponents	Score
Winner	22 November – 21 December 1997	Satellites	Portimão, Portugal 5	Clay	(Portugal) Nuno Marques	(France) Benoit Carelli (Germany) Meride Zahirovic	6–2, 6–3
Runner-up	14 February – 12 March 2000	Satellites	Chetumal, Mexico	Hard	(Portugal) António van Grichen	(United States) Rafael de Mesa (Mexico) Luis Uribe	4–6, 3–6
Runner-up	2 – 28 July 2001	Satellites	Espinho, Portugal 2	Clay	(Portugal) Bernardo Mota	(France) Jean-Michel Pequery (France) Gregory Zavialoff	6–4, 2–6, 6–7^{(5–7)}
Winner	22 October – 25 November 2001	Satellites	Albufeira, Portugal 4	Clay	(Portugal) Bernardo Mota	(Portugal) Pedro Pereira (Netherlands) Rogier Wassen	6–2, 6–3
Winner	29 April – 26 May 2002	Satellites	Espinho, Portugal 1	Clay	(Italy) Leonardo Azzaro	(Brazil) Iverson Barros (Brazil) Lucas Engel	6–3, 6–2
Winner	29 April – 26 May 2002	Satellites	Espinho, Portugal 1	Clay	(Italy) Leonardo Azzaro	(Portugal) Bernardo Mota (Portugal) Francisco Neves	7–6^{(7–4)}, 6–7^{(4–7)}, 6–3
Runner-up	15 July – 11 August 2002	Satellites	Miramar, Portugal 2	Clay	(Portugal) André Lopes	(Argentina) Guillermo Carry (Argentina) Alejandro Poberaj	2–6, 6–3, 3–6
Runner-up	10 – 16 March 2003	Futures	Faro, Portugal F5	Hard	(Portugal) Bernardo Mota	(Spain) Guillermo García López (Spain) Santiago Ventura	6–7^{(4–7)}, 7–6^{(8–6)}, 4–6

== Head-to-head vs. Top 20 players ==
This section contains Lopes' win-loss record against players who have been ranked 20th or higher in the world rankings during their careers.

Opponent	Highest rank	Matches	Won	Lost	Win %	Last match	Ref
(Finland) Jarkko Nieminen	13	1	0	1	0.00%	Lost (6–4, 1–6, 1–6) at the 2003 Estoril Open	
(Belarus) Max Mirnyi	18	1	0	1	0.00%	Lost (3–6, 3–6, 4–6) at the 2002 Davis Cup	
Total		2	0	2	0.00%	Statistics correct as of 10 April 2017	

== National participation ==
=== Davis Cup (2 wins, 4 losses) ===
Lopes played 6 matches in 5 ties for the Portugal Davis Cup team in 2002 and 2003. His singles record was 2–3 and his doubles record was 0–1 (2–4 overall).

Group membership World Group (0–0) WG Play-off (0–0) Group I (1–3) Group II (1–1) Group III (0–0) Group IV (0–0)	Matches by surface Hard (0–2) Clay (1–0) Grass (0–0) Carpet (1–2)	Matches by Type Singles (2–3) Doubles (0–1)	Matches by Setting Indoors (1–3) Outdoors (1–1)	Matches by Venue Portugal (1–0) Away (1–4)

- ▲ ▼ indicates the result of the Davis Cup match followed by the score, date, place of event, the zonal classification and its phase, and the court surface.

Rubber result	Rubber	Match type (partner if any)	Opponent nation	Opponent player(s)	Score
▼0–5; 8–10 February 2002; Harare, Zimbabwe; Group I Europe/Africa First Round; Hard(i) surface
Defeat	IV	Singles (dead rubber)	Zimbabwe	Wayne Black	6–7^{(5–7)}, 3–6
▼1–4; 12–14 July 2002; Olympic Training Centre, Minsk, Belarus; Group I Europe/Africa Relegation Playoff First Round; Carpet(i) surface
Defeat	II	Singles	Belarus	Max Mirnyi	3–6, 3–6, 4–6
Victory	IV	Singles (dead rubber)	Belarus	Alexander Skrypko	2–6, 6–3, 6–4
▼1–4; 20–22 September 2002; Follonica T.C., Follonica, Italy; Group I Europe/Africa Relegation Play-off Second Round; Carpet(i) surface
Defeat	III	Doubles (with Bernardo Mota)	Italy	Massimo Bertolini / Giorgio Galimberti	3–6, 7–6^{(7–4)}, 3–6, 4–6
▲4–1; 4–6 April 2003; Complexo Municipal de Ténis, Maia, Portugal; Group II Europe/Africa First Round; Clay surface
Victory	IV	Singles (dead rubber)	Monaco	Guillaume Couillard	7–5, 6–7^{(7–9)}, 7–6^{(7–2)}
▼0–5; 11–13 July 2003; Westridge Park, Durban, South Africa; Group II Europe/Africa Quarterfinal; Hard surface
Defeat	I	Singles	South Africa	Rik de Voest	6–7^{(3–7)}, 1–6, 4–6
