= Lado Chikhladze =

Georgian tennis player

- Country (sports): Georgia
- Born: 15 June 1985 (age 40) Tbilisi, Georgia
- Height: 1.91 m (6 ft 3 in)
- Plays: Right-handed
- Prize money: $34,363

Singles
- Career record: 10–12 (Davis Cup)
- Highest ranking: No. 350 (15 October 2007)

Doubles
- Career record: 9–6 (Davis Cup)
- Highest ranking: No. 549 (19 October 2009)

Lado Chikhladze (born 15 June 1985) is a Georgian former professional tennis player.

Chikhladze, a junior doubles finalist at the 2003 French Open, was a member of the Georgia Davis Cup team from 2004 to 2010. He appeared in a total of 16 ties, winning ten singles and nine doubles rubbers. All nine of his doubles wins came partnering Irakli Labadze, which is a Georgian record for a doubles pair.

While competing on the professional tour he had a best singles ranking of 350 in the world and won seven ITF Futures titles. His career was interrupted by a life-threatening neck injury he received in December 2007, when he jumped into a pond and hit his head on the bottom, causing a broken neck. A year later, following several months of bed rest, he was able to make a comeback to professional tennis. In 2012 he played in the qualifying draw for the BMW Open, an ATP Tour tournament in Munich.
