= Kim Tiilikainen =

Finnish tennis player and coach

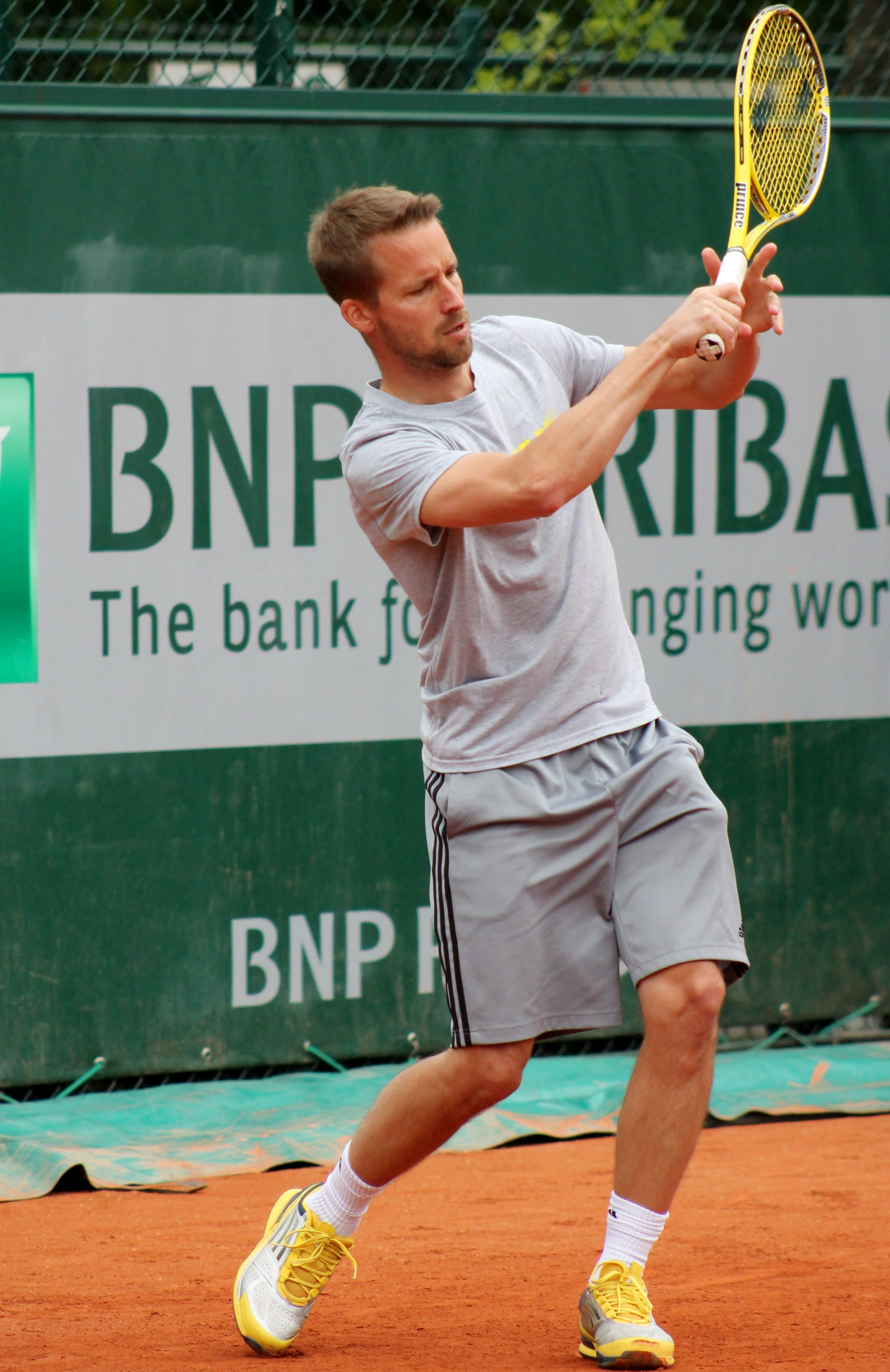
- Country (sports): Finland
- Born: 8 July 1975 (age 49); Helsinki, Finland
- Height: 5 ft 11 in (180 cm)
- Turned pro: 1994
- Plays: Right-handed
- Prize money: $111,567

Singles
- Career record: 3-6
- Career titles: 0
- Highest ranking: No. 207 (15 Mar 1999)

Grand Slam singles results
- French Open: 1R (1996)

Kim Tiilikainen (born 8 July 1975) is a former professional tennis player from Finland, now a tennis coach.

Tiilikainen qualified for his only Grand Slam in 1996, at the French Open. The only Finn in the draw, he was defeated by world no. 27 Andrea Gaudenzi in the opening round.

From 1995 to 2003, Tiilikainen appeared in nine Davis Cup ties for Finland. He won nine matches, all in singles. His best performances include a win over Anastasios Vasiliadis in the fifth and deciding rubber against Greece in 1997 and when he came from two sets down to beat Italian Davide Sanguinetti in 2002. He is the current coach of the Finland Davis Cup team and has coached Polish tennis player Jerzy Janowicz.
