= Laurent Bram =

Luxembourgish tennis player and coach

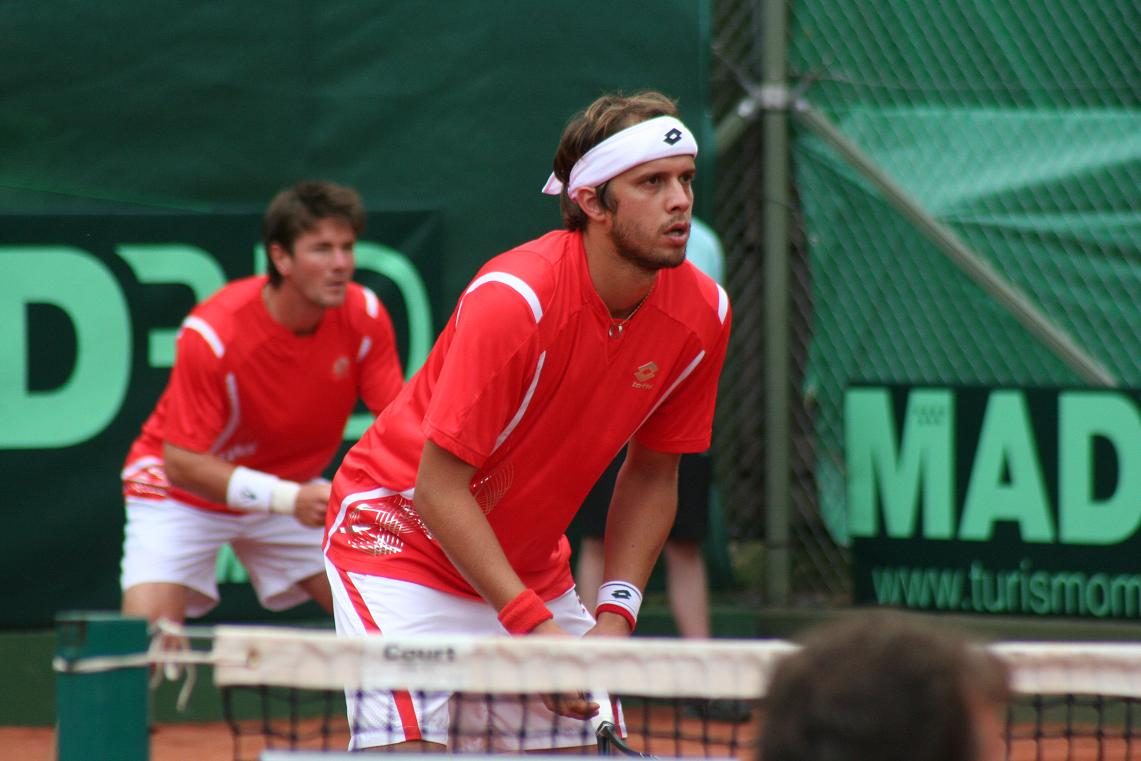
- Tennis players Laurent Bram (left) and Gilles Müller of Luxemburg playing Davis Cup double against Finland in Hanko, Finland in July 2008
- Country (sports): Luxembourg
- Born: March 31, 1984 (age 41) Mersch, Luxembourg
- Height: 1.93 m (6 ft 4 in)
- Turned pro: 2005
- Plays: Right-handed (one-handed backhand)
- Prize money: $6,435

Singles
- Career record: 2–12
- Career titles: 0
- Highest ranking: No. 996 (March 6, 2006)

Doubles
- Career record: 1–5
- Career titles: 0
- Highest ranking: No. 789 (16 October 2006)
Medal record
Games of the Small States of Europe
Bronze medal – third place	2013 Luxembourg	Mixed Doubles
- Last updated on: 29 May 2013.

Laurent Bram (born May 31, 1984) is a Luxembourgish tennis coach and a former professional player.

== ATP Challenger and Tour finals ==
=== Doubles (2 titles, 0 runner-up) ===
Legend (singles) ATP Challenger Tour (0-0) ITF Futures/World Tennis Tour (2–0)	Titles by surface Hard (0–0) Clay (2–0)

Result	W–L	Date	Tournament	Tier	Surface	Partner	Opponents	Score
Win	1–0	Jul 2006	Germany F9A, Wetzlar	Futures	Clay	(Romania) Artemon Apostu-Efremov	(Mexico) Fernando Cabrera (Germany) Tim Pütz	6–2, 6–3
Win	2–0	Sep 2006	Germany F14, Nürnberg-Herpesdorf	Futures	Clay	(Italy) Luca Bonati	(Czech Republic) Peter Frelich (Czech Republic) Filip Zeman	6–2, 6–4

== Tennis career ==
=== Juniors ===
As a junior, Bram reached as high as No. 184 in August 2002. He took top junior Josselin Ouanna to 3 sets at the Tournoi International Junior de St Francois.

=== Davis Cup ===
Bram has mainly played in the Davis Cup for his country, where he has a 5–14 win–loss record. He lost to Andy Murray 6–0, 6–0, 6–0 in the 2011 Davis Cup.
