= Genius Chidzikwe =

Zimbabwean tennis player

- Country (sports): Zimbabwe
- Born: August 3, 1979 (age 45)
- Turned pro: 1996
- Plays: Right-handed
- Prize money: US $15,748

Singles
- Career record: 3–15
- Career titles: 0
- Highest ranking: 389 (August 2, 2004)

Doubles
- Career record: 1–3
- Career titles: 0
- Highest ranking: 380 (April 7, 2003)
- Last updated on: June 20, 2012.

Genius Chidzikwe (born August 3, 1979) is a former Zimbabwean professional tennis player, who played mainly on the ITF Futures tournaments.

In the 2005 Davis Cup he played against future world number one tennis player 17-year-old Novak Djokovic and lost 4–6, 0–6, 4–6.

== Singles titles ==
Legend
Grand Slam (0)
Tennis Masters Cup (0)
ATP Masters Series (0)
ATP Tour (0)
Challengers (0)
Futures (1)

No.	Date	Tournament	Surface	Opponent	Score
1.	August 18, 2003	Lagos	Hard	(Ivory Coast) Valentin Sanon	6–1, 7–6^{(7–2)}
