= 2006 Davis Cup =

2006 edition of the Davis Cup

Details
- Duration: 10 February – 3 December 2006
- Edition: 95th

Champion
- Winning nation: Russia

The 2006 Davis Cup was the 95th edition of the most important tournament between nations in men's tennis. Sixteen teams participated in the World Group and 125 participated in total. The first round matches were played 10–12 February and the final took place 1–3 December 2006 at Olympic Stadium in Moscow, with Russia defeating Argentina.

== World Group ==
2006 World Group Teams
Argentina	Australia	Austria	Belarus
Chile	Croatia	France	Germany
Netherlands	Romania	Russia	Slovakia
Spain	Sweden	Switzerland	United States

=== Draw ===
First round 10-12 February
Graz, Austria (indoor clay)
S	Croatia	3
Austria	2
Buenos Aires, Argentina (clay)
S	Argentina	5
Sweden	0
Minsk, Belarus (indoor carpet)
S	Spain	1
Belarus	4
Geneva, Switzerland (indoor clay)
S	Australia	3
Switzerland	2
Halle, Germany (indoor hard)
Germany	2
S	France	3
Amsterdam, Netherlands (ind. carpet)
Netherlands	0
S	Russia	5
La Jolla, United States (hard)
Romania	1
S	United States	4
Rancagua, Chile (clay)
Chile	4
S	Slovakia	1

Quarterfinals; 7-9 April
Zagreb, Croatia (indoor carpet)
S	Croatia	2
S	Argentina	3
Melbourne, Australia (hard)
Belarus	0
S	Australia	5
Pau, France (indoor carpet)
S	France	1
S	Russia	4
Rancho Mirage, USA (grass)
S	United States	3
Chile	2

Semifinals; 22-24 September
Buenos Aires, Argentina (clay)
S	Argentina	5
S	Australia	0
Moscow, Russia (indoor clay)
S	Russia	3
S	United States	2

Final; 1-3 December
Moscow, Russia (indoor carpet)
S	Argentina	2
S	Russia	3

First round losers play along with Zonal Group I qualifiers in World Group play-offs.

=== Final ===
Russia
3
Olympic Stadium, Moscow, Russia
1-3 December 2006
Carpet (i)

Argentina
2

			1	2	3	4	5
1	(Russia) (Argentina)	Nikolay Davydenko; Juan Ignacio Chela	6; 1	6; 2	5; 7	6; 4
2	(Russia) (Argentina)	Marat Safin; David Nalbandian	4; 6	4; 6	4; 6
3	(Russia) (Argentina)	Marat Safin / Dmitry Tursunov; Agustín Calleri / David Nalbandian	6; 2	6; 3	6; 4
4	(Russia) (Argentina)	Nikolay Davydenko; David Nalbandian	2; 6	2; 6	6; 4	4; 6
5	(Russia) (Argentina)	Marat Safin; José Acasuso	6; 3	3; 6	6; 3	7^{7} 6^{5}

== World Group play-offs ==
Date: 22–24 September

Home team	Score	Visiting team	Location	Venue	Door	Surface
Austria	5–0	Mexico	Pörtschach	Werzer Arena	Outdoor	Clay
Germany	4–1	Thailand	Düsseldorf	Rochus Club	Outdoor	Clay
Netherlands	1–4	Czech Republic	Leiden	Groenoordhallen	Indoor	Carpet
Romania	4–1	South Korea	Bucharest	Club Sportiv Progresul Bucuresti	Outdoor	Clay
Slovakia	2–3	Belgium	Bratislava	Sibamac Arena	Indoor	Hard
Spain	4–1	Italy	Santander	Real Sociedad de Tenis de La Magdalena	Outdoor	Clay
Brazil	1–3	Sweden	Belo Horizonte	Expominas	Outdoor	Clay
Switzerland	4–1	Serbia and Montenegro	Geneva	Palexpo	Indoor	Hard

- Austria, Germany, Romania, Spain, Sweden and Switzerland will remain in the World Group in 2007.
- Belgium and Czech Republic are promoted to the World Group in 2007.
- Brazil, Italy, Mexico, Serbia and Montenegro, South Korea and Thailand will remain in Zonal Group I in 2007.
- Netherlands and Slovakia are relegated to Zonal Group I in 2007.

== Americas Zone ==
=== Group I ===
Second Round Play-offs
Higuerote, Venezuela (hard)
1	Ecuador	0
Venezuela	5

First Round Play-offs
Lima, Peru (clay)
1	Ecuador	1
Peru	4
Granby, Canada (hard)
Venezuela	1
2	Canada	3

First Round
1	Ecuador
bye
Asia, Peru (clay)
Peru	2
Brazil	3
Maracay, Venezuela (hard)
Venezuela	1
Mexico	4
bye
2	Canada

Second Round
Cuenca, Ecuador (clay)
1	Ecuador	0
Brazil	4
Mexico City (clay)
Mexico	4
2	Canada	1

- Ecuador relegated to Group II in 2007.
- Brazil and Mexico advance to World Group Play-off.

=== Group II ===
The Americas Zone was one of the three zones of the regional Davis Cup competition in 2006.

In the Americas Zone there were four different tiers, called groups, in which teams compete against each other to advance to the upper tier. Winners in Group II advanced to the Americas Zone Group I. Teams who lost their respective ties competed in the relegation play-offs, with winning teams remaining in Group II, whereas teams who lost their play-offs were relegated to the Americas Zone Group III in 2007.

== Participating nations ==
- Bolivia
- Colombia
- Dominican Republic
- Guatemala
- Jamaica
- Netherlands Antilles
- Paraguay
- Uruguay

=== Draw ===
Play-offs
Salto, Uruguay (clay)
Bolivia	0
3	Uruguay	5
Montego Bay, Jamaica (hard)
Guatemala	2
Jamaica	3

First Round
Santa Cruz, Bolivia (clay)
1	Paraguay	4
Bolivia	1
Bogotá, Colombia (clay)
3	Uruguay	1
Colombia	4
Emmastad, Curaçao (hard)
Guatemala	2
4	Netherlands Antilles	3
Santiago, Dominican Republic (clay)
Jamaica	0
2	Dominican Republic	5

Second Round
Bogotá, Colombia (clay)
1	Paraguay	1
Colombia	4
Emmastad, Curaçao (hard)
4	Netherlands Antilles	2
2	Dominican Republic	3

Third Round
Santo Domingo, Dominican Rep. (hard)
Colombia	5
2	Dominican Republic	0

- Bolivia and Guatemala relegated to Group III in 2007.
- Colombia promoted to Group I in 2007.

== First round ==
=== Bolivia vs. Paraguay ===
Bolivia
1
Club de Tenis de Santa Cruz, Santa Cruz de la Sierra, Bolivia
10–12 February 2006
Clay

Paraguay
4

			1	2	3	4	5
1	(Bolivia) (Paraguay)	Mauricio Estívariz; Emilio Báez Brítez	3; 6	3; 6	1; 6
2	(Bolivia) (Paraguay)	José Roberto Velasco; Ramón Delgado	0; 6	2; 6	4; 6
3	(Bolivia) (Paraguay)	José Antelo / Mauricio Estívariz; Emilio Báez Brítez / Ramón Delgado	2; 6	5; 7	2; 6
4	(Bolivia) (Paraguay)	Carlos Álvarez; Juan Lorenzo González	6; 1	6^{6} 7^{8}	2; 6
5	(Bolivia) (Paraguay)	José Roberto Velasco; Juan Carlos Ramírez	6; 2	4; 6	6; 1

=== Colombia vs. Uruguay ===
Colombia
4
America Tennis Club, Bogotá, Colombia
10–12 February 2006
Clay

Uruguay
1

			1	2	3	4	5
1	(Colombia) (Uruguay)	Alejandro Falla; Marcel Felder	6; 2	6; 1	6; 2
2	(Colombia) (Uruguay)	Santiago Giraldo; Pablo Cuevas	6; 4	7^{7} 6^{4}	7^{7} 6^{3}
3	(Colombia) (Uruguay)	Alejandro Falla / Carlos Salamanca; Pablo Cuevas / Martín Vilarrubí	4; 6	5; 7	6; 2	6; 4	6; 3
4	(Colombia) (Uruguay)	Pablo González; Martín Vilarrubí	6^{6} 7^{8}	2; 6
5	(Colombia) (Uruguay)	Carlos Salamanca; Federico Sansonetti	6; 3	6; 1

=== Netherlands Antilles vs. Guatemala ===
Netherlands Antilles
3
Sport & Ontspannings Vereniging Asiento - Rust & Burg Tennis Club, Emmastad, Netherlands Antilles
10–12 February 2006
Hard

Guatemala
2

			1	2	3	4	5
1	(Netherlands Antilles) (Guatemala)	Jean-Julien Rojer; Israel Morales	6; 3	6; 2	6; 1
2	(Netherlands Antilles) (Guatemala)	Rasid Winklaar; Cristian Paiz	6; 3	4; 6	6^{5} 7^{7}	7; 5	4; 6
3	(Netherlands Antilles) (Guatemala)	Raoul Behr / Jean-Julien Rojer; Cristian Paiz / Luis Pérez Chete	6; 4	7^{7} 6^{3}	6; 3
4	(Netherlands Antilles) (Guatemala)	Jean-Julien Rojer; Cristian Paiz	6; 1	6; 2	6; 3
5	(Netherlands Antilles) (Guatemala)	Alexander Blom; Israel Morales	6; 1	1; 6	6; 6			retired

=== Dominican Republic vs. Jamaica ===
Dominican Republic
5
Centro Español, Santiago, Dominican Republic
10–12 February 2006
Clay

Jamaica
0

			1	2	3	4	5
1	(Dominican Republic) (Jamaica)	Jhonson García; Scott Willinsky	6; 1	6; 3	6; 0
2	(Dominican Republic) (Jamaica)	Víctor Estrella Burgos; Ryan Russell	6; 3	6; 2	6; 0
3	(Dominican Republic) (Jamaica)	Víctor Estrella Burgos / Jhonson García; Ryan Russell / Jermaine Smith	6; 3	6; 3	7; 5
4	(Dominican Republic) (Jamaica)	Henry Estrella; Elvis Henry	3; 6	6; 4	6; 2
5	(Dominican Republic) (Jamaica)	Jesús Francisco Félix; Scott Willinsky	6; 2	6^{3} 7^{7}	6; 3

== Second round ==
=== Colombia vs. Paraguay ===
Colombia
4
America Tennis Club, Bogotá, Colombia
7–9 April 2006
Clay

Paraguay
1

			1	2	3	4	5
1	(Colombia) (Paraguay)	Santiago Giraldo; Ramón Delgado	6; 2	6; 4	6^{1} 7^{7}	6^{4} 7^{7}	8; 10
2	(Colombia) (Paraguay)	Alejandro Falla; Emilio Báez Brítez	6; 2	5; 7	6; 0	6; 3
3	(Colombia) (Paraguay)	Alejandro Falla / Carlos Salamanca; Ramón Delgado / Francisco Rodríguez	7; 5	3; 6	6; 6			retired
4	(Colombia) (Paraguay)	Alejandro Falla; Francisco Rodríguez	6; 0	6; 1	6; 3
5	(Colombia) (Paraguay)	Pablo González; Emilio Báez Brítez	6; 2	6; 1

=== Netherlands Antilles vs. Dominican Republic ===
Netherlands Antilles
2
SOV Asiento - Rust & Burgh Tennis Club, Emmastad, Netherlands Antilles
7–9 April 2006
Hard

Dominican Republic
3

			1	2	3	4	5
1	(Netherlands Antilles) (Dominican Republic)	Jean-Julien Rojer; Víctor Estrella Burgos	6; 1	6^{1} 7^{7}	7; 5	6; 1
2	(Netherlands Antilles) (Dominican Republic)	Alexander Blom; Jhonson García	0; 6	3; 6	1; 6
3	(Netherlands Antilles) (Dominican Republic)	Raoul Behr / Jean-Julien Rojer; Víctor Estrella Burgos / Jhonson García	6^{3} 7^{7}	4; 6	4; 6
4	(Netherlands Antilles) (Dominican Republic)	Jean-Julien Rojer; Jhonson García	6; 3	3; 6	6^{4} 7^{7}	6; 2	6; 4
5	(Netherlands Antilles) (Dominican Republic)	Rasid Winklaar; Víctor Estrella Burgos	2; 6	3; 6	5; 7

== Relegation play-offs ==
=== Uruguay vs. Bolivia ===
Uruguay
5
Club Remeros de Salto, Salto, Uruguay
7–9 April 2006
Clay

Bolivia
0

			1	2	3	4	5
1	(Uruguay) (Bolivia)	Pablo Cuevas; José Roberto Velasco	6; 2	6; 2	2; 6	6; 2
2	(Uruguay) (Bolivia)	Martín Vilarrubí; Mauricio Estívariz	3; 6	6; 4	6; 2	6; 2
3	(Uruguay) (Bolivia)	Pablo Cuevas / Marcel Felder; Carlos Álvarez / José Roberto Velasco	6; 0	6; 4	6; 2
4	(Uruguay) (Bolivia)	Marcel Felder; Mauricio Estívariz	6; 2	6; 0
5	(Uruguay) (Bolivia)	Federico Sansonetti; Jorge Villanueva	6; 1	6; 1

=== Jamaica vs. Guatemala ===
Jamaica
3
Tryall Club, Montego Bay, Jamaica
7–9 April 2006
Hard

Guatemala
2

			1	2	3	4	5
1	(Jamaica) (Guatemala)	Ryan Russell; Israel Morales	6; 4	6; 3	6; 2
2	(Jamaica) (Guatemala)	Damion Johnson; Cristian Paiz	4; 6	4; 6	7; 5	3; 6
3	(Jamaica) (Guatemala)	Ryan Russell / Jermaine Smith; Manuel Chávez / Luis Pérez Chete	7^{7} 6^{5}	6; 3	6; 1
4	(Jamaica) (Guatemala)	Ryan Russell; Cristian Paiz	6; 3	6; 0	3; 0			retired
5	(Jamaica) (Guatemala)	Eldad Campbell; Israel Morales	4; 6	1; 6

== Third round ==
=== Dominican Republic vs. Colombia ===
Dominican Republic
0
Pabellon de Tenis del Parque del Este, Santo Domingo, Dominican Republic
22–24 September 2006
Hard

Colombia
5

			1	2	3	4	5
1	(Dominican Republic) (Colombia)	Jhonson García; Alejandro Falla	2; 6	3; 6	3; 6
2	(Dominican Republic) (Colombia)	Víctor Estrella Burgos; Santiago Giraldo	1; 6	7; 5	4; 6	0; 4		retired
3	(Dominican Republic) (Colombia)	Víctor Estrella Burgos / Jhonson García; Alejandro Falla / Carlos Salamanca	4; 6	4; 6	4; 6
4	(Dominican Republic) (Colombia)	Jesús Francisco Félix; Pablo González	0; 6	1; 6
5	(Dominican Republic) (Colombia)	José Hernández-Fernández; Santiago Giraldo	7^{11} 6^{9}	3; 6	1; 6

=== Group III ===
Venue: Maya Country Club, Santa Tecla, El Salvador (clay)
Date: 14–18 June

	Group A	BAH	PUR	TRI	HON
1	Bahamas (2–1)		3–0	2–1	1–2
2	Puerto Rico (2–1)	0–3		3–0	3–0
3	Trinidad and Tobago (1–2)	1–2	0–3		3–0
4	Honduras (1–2)	2–1	0–3	0–3	

	Group B	ESA	CUB	HAI	CRC
1	El Salvador (2–1)		2–1	3–0	1–2
2	Cuba (2–1)	1–2		3–0	2–1
3	Haiti (1–2)	0–3	0–3		2–1
4	Costa Rica (1–2)	2–1	1–2	1–2	

(scores in italics carried over from Groups)

	1st–4th Play-off	ESA	CUB	BAH	PUR
1	El Salvador (3–0)		2–1	3–0	2–1
2	Cuba (2–1)	1–2		3–0	2–1
3	Bahamas (1–2)	0–3	0–3		3–0
4	Puerto Rico (0–3)	1–2	1–2	0–3	

	5th–8th Play-off	HAI	CRC	TRI	HON
1	Haiti (2–1)		2–1	2–1	0–3
2	Costa Rica (2–1)	1–2		2–1	2–1
3	Trinidad and Tobago (1–2)	1–2	1–2		3–0
4	Honduras (1–2)	3–0	1–2	0–3	

- El Salvador and Cuba promoted to Group II in 2007.
- Trinidad & Tobago and Honduras relegated to Group IV in 2007.

=== Group IV ===
The Americas Zone was one of the three zones of the regional Davis Cup competition in 2006.

In the Americas Zone there were four different tiers, called groups, in which teams competed against each other to advance to the upper tier. The five teams in Group IV played in a single Round-robin tournament. The top two teams were promoted to the Americas Zone Group III in 2007. All other teams remained in Group IV.

== Draw ==
- Venue: Maya Country Club, Santa Tecla, El Salvador (clay)
- Date: 14–18 June

		BAR	PAN	LCA	ISV	BER
1	Barbados (3–1)		2–1	2–1	1–2	3–0
2	Panama (3–1)	1–2		2–1	2–1	3–0
3	Saint Lucia (2–2)	1–2	1–2		3–0	3–0
4	U.S. Virgin Islands (2–2)	2–1	1–2	0–3		3–0
5	Bermuda (0–4)	0–3	0–3	0–3	0–3	

- Barbados and Panama promoted to Group III in 2007.

== Results ==
=== Saint Lucia vs. Bermuda ===
Saint Lucia
3
Maya Country Club, Santa Tecla, El Salvador
14 June 2006
Clay

Bermuda
0

			1	2	3
1	(Saint Lucia) (Bermuda)	Vernon Lewis; Jovan Whitter	6; 2	6; 1
2	(Saint Lucia) (Bermuda)	Alberton Richelieu; Romar Douglas	6; 1	6; 3
3	(Saint Lucia) (Bermuda)	Sirsean Arlain / Alberton Richelieu; Romar Douglas / Jovan Whitter	6; 3	6; 3

=== Barbados vs. U.S. Virgin Islands ===
Barbados
1
Maya Country Club, Santa Tecla, El Salvador
14 June 2006
Clay

U.S. Virgin Islands
2

			1	2	3
1	(Barbados) (United States Virgin Islands)	Russell Moseley; Kristepher Elien	5; 7	3; 6
2	(Barbados) (United States Virgin Islands)	Haydn Lewis; Terrance Eugene Highfield	1; 6	4; 6
3	(Barbados) (United States Virgin Islands)	Damien Applewhaite / Michael Date; Shane Dalton / Whitney McFarlane	6; 2	6; 4

=== Panama vs. Saint Lucia ===
Panama
2
Maya Country Club, Santa Tecla, El Salvador
15 June 2006
Clay

Saint Lucia
1

			1	2	3
1	(Panama) (Saint Lucia)	Arnulfo Courtney; Vernon Lewis	6; 3	6^{4} 7^{7}	6; 8
2	(Panama) (Saint Lucia)	Alberto González; Alberton Richelieu	6; 1	3; 6	6; 1
3	(Panama) (Saint Lucia)	Arnulfo Courtney / Alberto González; Sirsean Arlain / Alberton Richelieu	6; 4	6; 1

=== Barbados vs. Bermuda ===
Barbados
3
Maya Country Club, Santa Tecla, El Salvador
15 June 2006
Clay

Bermuda
0

			1	2	3
1	(Barbados) (Bermuda)	Russell Moseley; Jovan Whitter	6; 0	6; 3
2	(Barbados) (Bermuda)	Haydn Lewis; Romar Douglas	6; 1	6; 3
3	(Barbados) (Bermuda)	Damien Applewhaite / Michael Date; Romar Douglas / Tony Thompson	6; 1	6; 2

=== Panama vs. Bermuda ===
Panama
3
Maya Country Club, Santa Tecla, El Salvador
16 June 2006
Clay

Bermuda
0

			1	2	3
1	(Panama) (Bermuda)	Arnulfo Courtney; David Thomas	6; 4	6; 0
2	(Panama) (Bermuda)	Alberto González; Romar Douglas	6; 0	6; 3
3	(Panama) (Bermuda)	Alberto González / Juan Miguel González; David Thomas / Jovan Whitter	7; 5	6; 2

=== Saint Lucia vs. U.S. Virgin Islands ===
Saint Lucia
3
Maya Country Club, Santa Tecla, El Salvador
16 June 2006
Clay

U.S. Virgin Islands
0

			1	2	3
1	(Saint Lucia) (United States Virgin Islands)	Vernon Lewis; Kristepher Elien	6; 0	6; 1
2	(Saint Lucia) (United States Virgin Islands)	Alberton Richelieu; Terrance Eugene Highfield	6; 4	5; 7	6; 2
3	(Saint Lucia) (United States Virgin Islands)	Vernon Lewis / Alberton Richelieu; Shane Dalton / Kristepher Elien	6; 3	6; 4

=== Panama vs. U.S. Virgin Islands ===
Panama
2
Maya Country Club, Santa Tecla, El Salvador
17 June 2006
Clay

U.S. Virgin Islands
1

			1	2	3
1	(Panama) (United States Virgin Islands)	Arnulfo Courtney; Kristepher Elien	6; 4	6; 0
2	(Panama) (United States Virgin Islands)	Alberto González; Terrance Eugene Highfield	6; 3	4; 6	6; 2
3	(Panama) (United States Virgin Islands)	Juan Miguel González / Mario Cal; Kristepher Elien / Whitney McFarlane	5; 7	3; 6

=== Saint Lucia vs. Barbados ===
Saint Lucia
1
Maya Country Club, Santa Tecla, El Salvador
17 June 2006
Clay

Barbados
2

			1	2	3
1	(Saint Lucia) (Barbados)	Vernon Lewis; Russell Moseley	6; 1	6; 2
2	(Saint Lucia) (Barbados)	Alberton Richelieu; Haydn Lewis	3; 6	1; 6
3	(Saint Lucia) (Barbados)	Vernon Lewis / Alberton Richelieu; Haydn Lewis / Russell Moseley	6^{4} 7^{7}	2; 6

=== Panama vs. Barbados ===
Panama
1
Maya Country Club, Santa Tecla, El Salvador
18 June 2006
Clay

Barbados
2

			1	2	3
1	(Panama) (Barbados)	Arnulfo Courtney; Russell Moseley	3; 6	6; 0	6; 1
2	(Panama) (Barbados)	Alberto González; Haydn Lewis	6; 3	5; 7	3; 6
3	(Panama) (Barbados)	Arnulfo Courtney / Alberto González; Haydn Lewis / Russell Moseley	2; 6	2; 6

=== Bermuda vs. U.S. Virgin Islands ===
Bermuda
0
Maya Country Club, Santa Tecla, El Salvador
18 June 2006
Clay

U.S. Virgin Islands
3

			1	2	3
1	(Bermuda) (United States Virgin Islands)	Jovan Whitter; Kristepher Elien	4; 6	0; 6
2	(Bermuda) (United States Virgin Islands)	David Thomas; Terrance Eugene Highfield	0; 6	1; 6
3	(Bermuda) (United States Virgin Islands)	Romar Douglas / David Thomas; Kristepher Elien / Terrance Eugene Highfield	1; 6	1; 6

== Asia/Oceania Zone ==
=== Group I ===
Second round play-offs
Beijing, China (indoor hard)
S	Pakistan	0
China	5

First round play-offs
Mumbai, India (grass)
S	India	3
S	Pakistan	2
Tashkent, Uzbekistan (clay)
China	0
Uzbekistan	3

First round
Changwon, South Korea (hard)
S	India	1
South Korea	4
Taipei, Taiwan (hard)
S	Pakistan	2
Chinese Taipei	3
Osaka, Japan (indoor carpet)
China	0
S	Japan	5
Tashkent, Uzbekistan (indoor hard)
Uzbekistan	2
S	Thailand	3

Second round
Taipei, Taiwan (hard)
South Korea	3
Chinese Taipei	2
Bangkok, Thailand (hard)
S	Japan	2
S	Thailand	3

- Pakistan relegated to Group II in 2007.
- South Korea and Thailand advance to World Group Play-off.

=== Group II ===
Play-offs
Jounieh, Lebanon (clay)
Lebanon	0
3	Kuwait	5
Nouméa, New Caledonia (hard)
Pacific Oceania	3
Malaysia	2

First Round
Auckland, New Zealand (indoor hard)
1	New Zealand	5
Lebanon	0
Kuwait City, Kuwait (hard)
3	Kuwait	2
Kazakhstan	3
Hong Kong, China (hard)
Pacific Oceania	1
4	Hong Kong	4
Balikpapan, Indonesia (hard)
Malaysia	0
2	Indonesia	5

Second Round
Almaty, Kazakhstan (indoor hard)
1	New Zealand	2
Kazakhstan	3
Surabaya, Indonesia (hard)
4	Hong Kong	0
2	Indonesia	5

Third Round
Almaty, Kazakhstan (indoor hard)
Kazakhstan	3
2	Indonesia	2

- Lebanon and Malaysia relegated to Group III in 2007.
- Kazakhstan promoted to Group I in 2007.

=== Group III ===
Venue: Manila Polo Club, Makati, Manila, Philippines (indoor clay)
Date: 19–23 July

	Group A	PHI	SRI	VIE	SIN
1	Philippines (3–0)		3–0	3–0	3–0
2	Sri Lanka (2–1)	0–3		2–1	3–0
3	Vietnam (1–2)	0–3	1–2		2–1
4	Singapore (0–3)	0–3	0–3	1–2	

	Group B	IRI	KSA	BRN	BAN
1	Iran (3–0)		3–0	3–0	3–0
2	Saudi Arabia (2–1)	0–3		2–1	2–1
3	Bahrain (1–2)	0–3	1–2		2–1
4	Bangladesh (0–3)	0–3	1–2	1–2	

(scores in italics carried over from Groups)

	1st–4th Play-off	PHI	IRI	SRI	KSA
1	Philippines (3–0)		3–0	3–0	3–0
2	Iran (2–1)	0–3		2–1	3–0
3	Sri Lanka (1–2)	0–3	1–2		2–1
4	Saudi Arabia (0–3)	0–3	0–3	1–2	

	5th–8th Play-off	VIE	SIN	BRN	BAN
1	Vietnam (3–0)		2–1	3–0	2–1
2	Singapore (2–1)	1–2		2–1	2–1
3	Bahrain (1–2)	0–3	1–2		2–1
4	Bangladesh (0–3)	1–2	1–2	1–2	

- Philippines and Iran promoted to Group II in 2007.
- Bahrain and Bangladesh relegated to Group IV in 2007.

=== Group IV ===
Venue: Al Hussein Tennis Club, Amman, Jordan (hard)
Date: 6–9 April

	Pool A	OMA	IRQ	MYA	QAT
1	Oman (3–0)		3–0	3–0	3–0
2	Iraq (2–1)	0–3		2–1	2–1
3	Myanmar (1–2)	0–3	1–2		2–1
4	Qatar (0–3)	0–3	1–2	1–2	

	Pool B	UAE	SYR	TJK	JOR	TKM
1	United Arab Emirates (4–0)		2–1	3–0	3–0	3–0
2	Syria (3–1)	1–2		2–1	2–1	3–0
3	Tajikistan (2–2)	0–3	1–2		2–1	3–0
4	Jordan (1–3)	0–3	1–2	1–2		3–0
5	Turkmenistan (0–4)	0–3	0–3	0–3	0–3	

- Oman and United Arab Emirates promoted to Group III in 2007.

== Europe/Africa Zone ==
=== Group I ===
Second Round Play-offs
Marrakesh, Morocco (clay)
Morocco	2
Portugal	3
Odesa, Ukraine (clay)
4	Great Britain	3
Ukraine	2

First Round Play-offs
Morocco
bye
bye
Portugal
Eastbourne, UK (grass)
Israel	3
4	Great Britain	2
Ukraine
bye

First round
1	Czech Republic
bye
Morocco
bye
3	Italy
bye
Esch/Alzette, Luxembourg (indoor hard)
Portugal	1
Luxembourg	4
Ramat Hasharon, Israel (hard)
Israel	1
Serbia and Montenegro	4
bye
4	Great Britain
bye
Ukraine
bye
2	Belgium

Second round
Oujda, Morocco (clay)
1	Czech Republic	5
Morocco	0
Torre del Greco, Italy (clay)
3	Italy	5
Luxembourg	0
Glasgow, UK (indoor carpet)
Serbia and Montenegro	3
4	Great Britain	2
Kyiv, Ukraine (indoor carpet)
Ukraine	1
2	Belgium	4

- Morocco and Ukraine relegated to Group II in 2007.
- Czech Republic, Italy, Serbia and Montenegro, and Belgium advance to World Group Play-off.

=== Group II ===
Relegation Play-offs
Thessaloniki, Greece (clay)
Zimbabwe	1
S	Greece	4
Dublin, Ireland (grass)
Ireland	1
S	Slovenia	4
Cairo, Egypt (clay)
S	Egypt	2
Cyprus	3
Jūrmala, Latvia (clay)
Latvia	3
S	South Africa	2

First Round
Harare, Zimbabwe (hard)
S	Zimbabwe	1
Norway	4
Athens, Greece (clay)
S	Greece	1
North Macedonia	4
Helsinki, Finland (indoor hard)
S	Finland	3
Ireland	2
Algiers, Algeria (clay)
S	Slovenia	2
Algeria	3
Hódmezővásárhely, Hungary (indoor hard)
Egypt	0
S	Hungary	5
Plovdiv, Bulgaria (clay)
Cyprus	2
S	Bulgaria	3
Poznań, Poland (indoor carpet)
Latvia	0
S	Poland	5
Tbilisi, Georgia (indoor carpet)
Georgia	3
S	South Africa	2

Second Round
Oslo, Norway (clay)
S	Norway	2
North Macedonia	3
Hanko, Finland (clay)
S	Finland	4
Algeria	1
Plovdiv, Bulgaria (clay)
Hungary	3
S	Bulgaria	2
Gdynia, Poland (clay)
S	Poland	2
Georgia	3

Third Round
Skopje, North Macedonia (clay)
North Macedonia	3
S	Finland	2
Budapest, Hungary (clay)
S	Hungary	2
Georgia	3

- Zimbabwe, Ireland, Egypt, and South Africa relegated to Group III in 2007.
- North Macedonia and Georgia promoted to Group I in 2007.

=== Group III ===
==== Zone A ====
- Venue: Teniski Klub 'MLADOST', Banja Luka, Bosnia and Herzegovina (outdoor clay)
- Date: 19–23 July

Rank	Team
1	Monaco
2	Estonia
3	Turkey
4	Lithuania
5	Bosnia and Herzegovina
6	Moldova
7	Armenia
8	Andorra

- Monaco and Estonia promoted to Group II in 2007.
- Armenia and Andorra relegated to Group IV in 2007.

==== Zone B ====
- Venue: BTA Centre (Notswane Courts), Gaborone, Botswana (outdoor hard)
- Date: 26–30 July

Rank	Team
1	Denmark
2	Nigeria
3	Ghana
4	Namibia
5	Tunisia
6	Ivory Coast
7	Botswana
8	Rwanda

- Denmark and Nigeria promoted to Group II in 2007.
- Botswana and Rwanda relegated to Group IV in 2007.

=== Group IV ===
- Venue: Marsa Sports Club, Marsa, Malta (outdoor hard)
- Date: 19–23 July

The Europe/Africa Zone was one of the three zones of the regional Davis Cup competition in 2006.

In the Europe/Africa Zone there were four different tiers, called groups, in which teams competed against each other to advance to the upper tier. The Group IV tournament was held July 19–23, in Marsa Sports Club, Marsa, Malta, on outdoor hard courts.

== Format ==
Senegal withdrew from the tournament. The seven remaining teams were split into two groups and played in a round-robin format. The top two teams of each group were promoted to the Europe/Africa Zone Group III in 2007. They were placed in the promotion pool to determine places 1–4. The remaining teams in each group from the preliminary round were placed in a second pool to determine places 5–7.

== Pool A ==
	Pool A	ISL	SMR	MLT	UGA
1	Iceland (3–0)		2–1	2–1	2–1
2	San Marino (2–1)	1–2		2–1	2–1
3	Malta (1–2)	1–2	1–2		2–1
4	Uganda (0–3)	1–2	1–2	1–2	

=== Iceland vs. San Marino ===
Iceland
2
Marsa Sports Club, Marsa, Malta
19 July 2006
Hard

San Marino
1

			1	2	3
1	(Iceland) (San Marino)	Andri Jonsson; Domenico Vicini	1; 6	5; 7
2	(Iceland) (San Marino)	Arnar Sigurðsson; Diego Zonzini	6; 4	6; 2
3	(Iceland) (San Marino)	Andri Jonsson / Arnar Sigurðsson; Christian Rosti / Domenico Vicini	2; 6	6; 1	6; 2

=== Malta vs. Uganda ===
Malta
2
Marsa Sports Club, Marsa, Malta
19 July 2006
Hard

Uganda
1

			1	2	3
1	(Malta) (Uganda)	Matthew Asciak; Patrick Olobo	6; 1	7; 5
2	(Malta) (Uganda)	Daniel Ceross; Patrick Ochan	3; 6	6^{4} 7^{7}
3	(Malta) (Uganda)	Matthew Asciak / Daniel Ceross; Patrick Ochan / Patrick Olobo	6^{6} 7^{8}	7; 5	6; 3

=== Iceland vs. Malta ===
Iceland
2
Marsa Sports Club, Marsa, Malta
20 July 2006
Hard

Malta
1

			1	2	3
1	(Iceland) (Malta)	Andri Jonsson; Matthew Asciak	0; 6	2; 6
2	(Iceland) (Malta)	Arnar Sigurðsson; Daniel Ceross	6; 2	6; 1
3	(Iceland) (Malta)	Andri Jonsson / Arnar Sigurðsson; Gordon Asciak / Matthew Asciak	6; 4	7^{7} 6^{3}

=== San Marino vs. Uganda ===
San Marino
2
Marsa Sports Club, Marsa, Malta
20 July 2006
Hard

Uganda
1

			1	2	3
1	(San Marino) (Uganda)	Domenico Vicini; Patrick Olobo	7^{7} 6^{4}	6; 2
2	(San Marino) (Uganda)	Diego Zonzini; Patrick Ochan	2; 6	2; 6
3	(San Marino) (Uganda)	Christian Rosti / Domenico Vicini; Cedric Babu / Patrick Ochan	6; 2	7^{7} 6^{5}

=== Iceland vs. Uganda ===
Iceland
2
Marsa Sports Club, Marsa, Malta
21 July 2006
Hard

Uganda
1

			1	2	3
1	(Iceland) (Uganda)	Jón Axel Jónsson; Godfrey Uzunga	7^{7} 6^{3}	0; 6	2; 6
2	(Iceland) (Uganda)	Arnar Sigurðsson; Patrick Ochan	6; 1	6; 0
3	(Iceland) (Uganda)	Arnar Sigurðsson / Jón Axel Jónsson; Cedric Babu / Patrick Olobo	6; 2	6; 2

=== San Marino vs. Malta ===
San Marino
2
Marsa Sports Club, Marsa, Malta
21 July 2006
Hard

Malta
1

			1	2	3
1	(San Marino) (Malta)	Christian Rosti; Matthew Asciak	1; 6	4; 6
2	(San Marino) (Malta)	Domenico Vicini; Daniel Ceross	6; 4	5; 7	6; 2
3	(San Marino) (Malta)	Christian Rosti / Domenico Vicini; Matthew Asciak / Daniel Ceross	7; 5	4; 6	6; 1

== Pool B ==
	Pool B	MRI	MAD	AZE
1	Mauritius (2–0)		2–1	2–1
2	Madagascar (1–1)	1–2		3–0
3	Azerbaijan (0–2)	1–2	0–3	

=== Azerbaijan vs. Madagascar ===
Azerbaijan
0
Marsa Sports Club, Marsa, Malta
19 July 2006
Hard

Madagascar
3

			1	2	3
1	(Azerbaijan) (Madagascar)	Farid Shirinov; Thierry Rajaobelina	0; 6	2; 6
2	(Azerbaijan) (Madagascar)	Emin Ağayev; Jacob Rasolondrazana	2; 6	4; 6
3	(Azerbaijan) (Madagascar)	Emin Ağayev / Fakhraddin Shirinov; Antso Rakotondramanga / Vatsy Rakotondramanga	4; 6	6; 2	4; 6

=== Madagascar vs. Mauritius ===
Madagascar
1
Marsa Sports Club, Marsa, Malta
20 July 2006
Hard

Mauritius
2

			1	2	3
1	(Madagascar) (Mauritius)	Thierry Rajaobelina; Kamil Patel	5; 7	6; 0	6; 1
2	(Madagascar) (Mauritius)	Jacob Rasolondrazana; Bruno Gorayah	3; 6	6; 4	4; 6
3	(Madagascar) (Mauritius)	Thierry Rajaobelina / Antso Rakotondramanga; Bruno Gorayah / Kamil Patel	6^{4} 7^{7}	2; 6

=== Azerbaijan vs. Mauritius ===
Azerbaijan
1
Marsa Sports Club, Marsa, Malta
21 July 2006
Hard

Mauritius
2

			1	2	3
1	(Azerbaijan) (Mauritius)	Fakhraddin Shirinov; Kamil Patel	0; 6	7^{8} 6^{6}	5; 7
2	(Azerbaijan) (Mauritius)	Emin Ağayev; Bruno Gorayah	6^{1} 7^{7}	6^{6} 7^{8}
3	(Azerbaijan) (Mauritius)	Emin Ağayev / Ramin Hajiyev; Alexandre Daruty / Bruno Gorayah	6; 3	6; 2

== Promotion pool ==
The top two teams from each of Pools A and B advanced to the Promotion pool. Results and points from games against the opponent from the preliminary round were carried forward.

(scores in italics carried over from Groups)

	1st–4th Play-off	MRI	MAD	ISL	SMR
1	Mauritius (3–0)		2–1	3–0	2–1
2	Madagascar (2–1)	1–2		2–1	3–0
3	Iceland (1–2)	0–3	1–2		2–1
4	San Marino (0–3)	1–2	0–3	1–2	

Mauritius, Madagascar, Iceland, and San Marino promoted to Group III in 2007.

=== Iceland vs. Madagascar ===
Iceland
1
Marsa Sports Club, Marsa, Malta
22 July 2006
Hard

Madagascar
2

			1	2	3
1	(Iceland) (Madagascar)	Andri Jonsson; Thierry Rajaobelina	0; 6	1; 6
2	(Iceland) (Madagascar)	Arnar Sigurðsson; Jacob Rasolondrazana	6; 2	6; 1
3	(Iceland) (Madagascar)	Magnús Gunnarsson / Jón Axel Jónsson; Thierry Rajaobelina / Jacob Rasolondrazana	2; 6	0; 6

=== San Marino vs. Mauritius ===
San Marino
1
Marsa Sports Club, Marsa, Malta
22 July 2006
Hard

Mauritius
2

			1	2	3
1	(San Marino) (Mauritius)	Diego Zonzini; Kamil Patel	1; 6	1; 6
2	(San Marino) (Mauritius)	William Forcellini; Alexandre Daruty	6; 3	1; 6	6; 2
3	(San Marino) (Mauritius)	Christian Rosti / Domenico Vicini; Bruno Gorayah / Kamil Patel	5; 7	6; 2	3; 6

=== Iceland vs. Mauritius ===
Iceland
0
Marsa Sports Club, Marsa, Malta
23 July 2006
Hard

Mauritius
3

			1	2	3
1	(Iceland) (Mauritius)	Magnús Gunnarsson; Kamil Patel	0; 6	0; 6
2	(Iceland) (Mauritius)	Jón Axel Jónsson; Bruno Gorayah	1; 6	2; 6
3	(Iceland) (Mauritius)	Magnús Gunnarsson / Jón Axel Jónsson; Bruno Gorayah / Kamil Patel	1; 6	1; 6

=== San Marino vs. Madagascar ===
San Marino
0
Marsa Sports Club, Marsa, Malta
23 July 2006
Hard

Madagascar
3

			1	2	3
1	(San Marino) (Madagascar)	Diego Zonzini; Thierry Rajaobelina	2; 6	3; 6
2	(San Marino) (Madagascar)	William Forcellini; Antso Rakotondramanga	0; 6	4; 6
3	(San Marino) (Madagascar)	Domenico Vicini / Diego Zonzini; Vatsy Rakotondramanga / Jacob Rasolondrazana	3; 6	3; 6

== Placement pool ==
The bottom two teams from Pool A and the bottom team from Pool B were placed in the placement pool to determine places 5–7. Results and points from games against the opponent from the preliminary round were carried forward.

(scores in italics carried over from Groups)

	5th–7th Play-off	MLT	AZE	UGA
1	Malta (2–0)		2–1	2–1
2	Azerbaijan (1–1)	1–2		3–0
3	Uganda (0–2)	1–2	0–3	

=== Azerbaijan vs. Malta ===
Azerbaijan
1
Marsa Sports Club, Marsa, Malta
22 July 2006
Hard

Malta
2

			1	2	3
1	(Azerbaijan) (Malta)	Ramin Hajiyev; Phillip Zarb Mizzi	5; 7	1; 6
2	(Azerbaijan) (Malta)	Fakhraddin Shirinov; Daniel Ceross	3; 6	6; 1		retired
3	(Azerbaijan) (Malta)	Emin Ağayev / Fakhraddin Shirinov; Gordon Asciak / Matthew Asciak	0; 6	1; 6

=== Azerbaijan vs. Uganda ===
Azerbaijan
3
Marsa Sports Club, Marsa, Malta
23 July 2006
Hard

Uganda
0

			1	2	3
1	(Azerbaijan) (Uganda)	Ramin Hajiyev; N.A.				w/o
2	(Azerbaijan) (Uganda)	Fakhraddin Shirinov; N.A.				w/o
3	(Azerbaijan) (Uganda)	Ramin Hajiyev / Fakhraddin Shirinov; N.A. / N.A.				w/o

== Final standings ==
Rank	Team
1	Mauritius
2	Madagascar
3	Iceland
4	San Marino
5	Malta
6	Azerbaijan
7	Uganda

- Mauritius, Madagascar, Iceland, and San Marino promoted to Group III in 2007.
- Senegal withdrew from the tournament.

== See also ==
- Davis Cup
