= 2008 Davis Cup =

2008 edition of the Davis Cup

Details
- Duration: 8 February – 23 November 2008
- Edition: 97th

Champion
- Winning nation: Spain

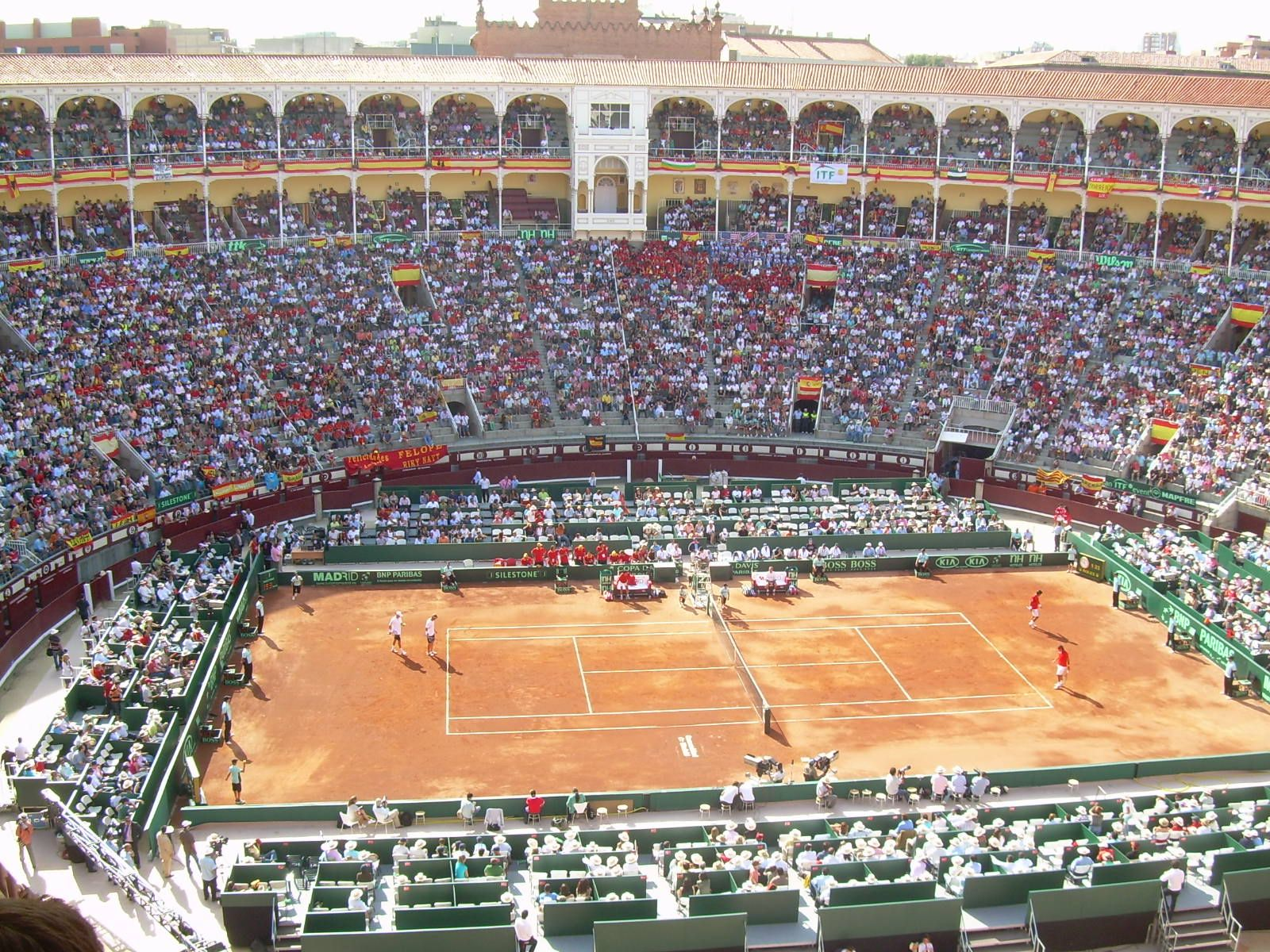
Semifinal match between the future champion, Spain, and the USA in Las Ventas bullring.

The 2008 Davis Cup was the 97th edition of the most important tournament between national teams in men's tennis. Sixteen teams participated in the World Group and more than one hundred others took part in different regional groups. The first matches were played on February 8–10. The final took place on November 21–23 at Estadio Polideportivo Islas Malvinas, Mar del Plata, Argentina, with Spain beating Argentina 3–1 to clinch their 3rd Davis Cup title. Mongolia made its first appearance in the tournament.

== World Group ==
Participating Teams
| Argentina | Austria | Belgium | Czech Republic |
| France | Great Britain | Germany | Israel |
| Peru | Romania | Russia | Serbia |
| South Korea | Spain | Sweden | United States |

=== Draw ===
First round 8–10 February
Moscow, Russia (indoor hard)
1 | Russia | 3
Serbia | 2
Ostrava, Czech Republic (indoor carpet)
8 | Belgium | 2
Czech Republic | 3
Buenos Aires, Argentina (clay)
3 | Argentina | 4
Great Britain | 1
Ramat HaSharon, Israel (hard)
6 | Sweden | 3
Israel | 2
Braunschweig, Germany (indoor clay)
South Korea | 2
4 | Germany | 3
Lima, Peru (clay)
Peru | 0
5 | Spain | 5
Sibiu, Romania (indoor hard)
Romania | 0
7 | France | 5
Vienna, Austria (indoor clay)
Austria | 1
2 | United States | 4

Quarterfinals; 11–13 April
Moscow, Russia (indoor clay)
1 | Russia | 3
Czech Republic | 2
Buenos Aires, Argentina (clay)
3 | Argentina | 4
6 | Sweden | 1
Bremen, Germany (indoor hard)
4 | Germany | 1
5 | Spain | 4
Winston-Salem, USA (indoor hard)
7 | France | 1
2 | United States | 4

Semifinals; 19–21 September
Buenos Aires, Argentina (clay)
1 | Russia | 2
3 | Argentina | 3
Madrid, Spain (clay)
5 | Spain | 4
2 | United States | 1

Final; 21–23 November
Mar del Plata, Argentina (indoor hard)
3 | Argentina | 1
5 | Spain | 3

=== Final ===
Argentina
1
Estadio Polideportivo, Mar del Plata, Argentina
21–23 November 2008
Hard (i)

Spain
3

| | | | 1 | 2 | 3 | 4 | 5 |
|---|---|---|---|---|---|---|---|---|
| 1 | (Argentina) (Spain) | David Nalbandian; David Ferrer | 6; 3 | 6; 2 | 6; 3 |
| 2 | (Argentina) (Spain) | Juan Martín del Potro; Feliciano López | 6; 4 | 6^{2} 7^{7} | 6^{4} 7^{7} | 3; 6 |
| 3 | (Argentina) (Spain) | Agustín Calleri / David Nalbandian; Feliciano López / Fernando Verdasco | 7; 5 | 5; 7 | 6^{5} 7^{7} | 3; 6 |
| 4 | (Argentina) (Spain) | José Acasuso; Fernando Verdasco | 3; 6 | 7^{7} 6^{3} | 6; 4 | 3; 6 | 1; 6 |
| 5 | (Argentina) (Spain) | David Nalbandian; Feliciano López | | | | | | not played |

== World Group play-offs ==
- Date: 19–21 September

The eight losing teams in the World Group first round ties, and eight winners of the Group I second round ties entered the draw for the World Group play-offs. Eight seeded teams, based on the Davis Cup rankings as of 14 April, were drawn against eight unseeded teams.

| Home team | Score | Visiting team | Location | Venue | Door | Surface |
|---|---|---|---|---|---|---|
| Chile | 3–2 | Australia | Antofagasta | Estadio Militar Antofagasta | Outdoor | Clay |
| Great Britain | 2–3 | Austria | Wimbledon, London | All England Lawn Tennis Club | Outdoor | Grass |
| Switzerland | 4–1 | Belgium | Lausanne | Centre Intercommunal de Glace Malley | Indoor | Hard |
| Croatia | 4–1 | Brazil | Zadar | Športski centar Višnjik | Indoor | Hard |
| Israel | 4–1 | Peru | Ramat HaSharon | Israel Tennis Center | Outdoor | Hard |
| Netherlands | 3–2 | South Korea | Apeldoorn | Omnisport Apeldoorn | Indoor | Clay |
| Romania | 4–1 | India | Bucharest | Clubul Sportiv Progresul | Outdoor | Clay |
| Slovakia | 1–4 | Serbia | Bratislava | Sibamac Arena | Indoor | Hard |

- Austria, Israel, Romania, and Serbia will remain in the World Group in 2009.
- Chile, Croatia, Netherlands and Switzerland are promoted to the World Group in 2009.
- Australia, Brazil, India and Slovakia will remain in Zonal Group I in 2009.
- Belgium, Great Britain, Peru and South Korea are relegated to Zonal Group I in 2009.

== Americas Zone ==
=== Group I ===
Second Round Play-offs
León, Mexico (indoor carpet)
Mexico | 2
Uruguay | 3

First Round Play-offs
bye
Mexico
Uruguay
bye

First Round
1 | Chile
bye
Calgary, Canada (indoor carpet)
Mexico | 1
Canada | 4
Punta del Este, Uruguay (clay)
Uruguay | 2
Colombia | 3
bye
2 | Brazil

Second Round
Santiago, Chile (clay)
1 | Chile | 3
Canada | 2
Sorocaba, Brazil (clay)
Colombia | 1
2 | Brazil | 4

- Mexico relegated to Group II in 2009.
- Chile and Brazil advance to World Group Play-off.

=== Group II ===
The Americas Zone was one of the three zones of the regional Davis Cup competition in 2008.

In the Americas Zone there were four different tiers, called groups, in which teams compete against each other to advance to the upper tier. Winners in Group II advanced to the Americas Zone Group I. Teams who lost their respective ties competed in the relegation play-offs, with winning teams remaining in Group II, whereas teams who lost their play-offs were relegated to the Americas Zone Group III in 2009.

== Participating nations ==
- Bahamas
- Bolivia
- Dominican Republic
- Ecuador
- El Salvador
- Netherlands Antilles
- Paraguay
- Venezuela

=== Draw ===
Play-offs
Emmastad, Curaçao (hard)
Netherlands Antilles | 3
Bolivia | 2
San Juan de los Morros, Ven. (hard)
3 | Venezuela | 4
El Salvador | 1

First Round
Emmastad, Curaçao (hard)
1 | Ecuador | 4
Netherlands Antilles | 1
Santa Cruz de la Sierra, Bolivia (clay)
4 | Dominican Republic | 5
Bolivia | 0
Nassau, Bahamas (hard)
Bahamas | 4
3 | Venezuela | 1
Lambaré, Paraguay (clay)
El Salvador | 2
2 | Paraguay | 3

Second Round
Guayaquil, Ecuador (clay)
1 | Ecuador | 4
4 | Dominican Republic | 1
Nassau, Bahamas (hard)
Bahamas | 1
2 | Paraguay | 4

Third Round
Lambaré, Paraguay (indoor hard)
1 | Ecuador | 3
2 | Paraguay | 2

- Bolivia and El Salvador relegated to Group III in 2009.
- Ecuador promoted to Group I in 2009.

== First round ==
=== Netherlands Antilles vs. Ecuador ===
Netherlands Antilles
1
S.O.V. Asiento, Emmastad, Curaçao, Netherlands Antilles
8–10 February 2008
Hard

Ecuador
4

| | | | 1 | 2 | 3 | 4 | 5 |
|---|---|---|---|---|---|---|---|
| 1 | (Netherlands Antilles) (Ecuador) | Romano Tatuhey; Julio César Campozano | 6; 2 | 4; 6 | 7^{9} 6^{7} | 7^{7} 6^{4} |
| 2 | (Netherlands Antilles) (Ecuador) | Alexander Blom; Carlos Avellán | 3; 6 | 2; 6 | 2; 6 |
| 3 | (Netherlands Antilles) (Ecuador) | Alexander Blom / Romano Tatuhey; Carlos Avellán / Iván Endara | 7^{7} 6^{4} | 6^{4} 7^{7} | 1; 6 | 6^{4} 7^{7} |
| 4 | (Netherlands Antilles) (Ecuador) | Nick Van Rosberg; Julio César Campozano | 2; 6 | 1; 6 | 3; 6 |
| 5 | (Netherlands Antilles) (Ecuador) | Jason Engelhardt; Iván Endara | 2; 6 | 0; 6 |

=== Bolivia vs. Dominican Republic ===
Bolivia
0
Club de Tenis Santa Cruz, Santa Cruz de la Sierra, Bolivia
8–10 February 2008
Clay

Dominican Republic
5

| | | | 1 | 2 | 3 | 4 | 5 |
|---|---|---|---|---|---|---|---|
| 1 | (Bolivia) (Dominican Republic) | Mauricio Estívariz; Jhonson García | 4; 6 | 4; 6 | 6; 3 | 6; 4 | 2; 6 |
| 2 | (Bolivia) (Dominican Republic) | José Roberto Velasco; Víctor Estrella Burgos | 2; 6 | 6; 4 | 2; 6 | 4; 6 |
| 3 | (Bolivia) (Dominican Republic) | Diego Camacho / José Roberto Velasco; Víctor Estrella Burgos / Jhonson García | 6; 3 | 3; 6 | 4; 6 | 0; 6 |
| 4 | (Bolivia) (Dominican Republic) | Mauricio Doria-Medina; Víctor Estrella Burgos | 2; 6 | 3; 6 |
| 5 | (Bolivia) (Dominican Republic) | Diego Camacho; Henry Estrella | 6; 3 | 4; 6 | 5; 7 |

=== Bahamas vs. Venezuela ===
Bahamas
4
National Tennis Center, Nassau, Bahamas
8–10 February 2008
Hard

Venezuela
1

| | | | 1 | 2 | 3 | 4 | 5 |
|---|---|---|---|---|---|---|---|
| 1 | (The Bahamas) (Venezuela) | Timothy Neilly; Yohny Romero | 4; 6 | 0; 6 | 6^{10} 7^{12} |
| 2 | (The Bahamas) (Venezuela) | Devin Mullings; José de Armas | 6; 2 | 7; 5 | 6; 0 |
| 3 | (The Bahamas) (Venezuela) | Mark Knowles / Marvin Rolle; José de Armas / Piero Luisi | 6; 1 | 6; 4 | 4; 6 | 7^{7} 6^{4} |
| 4 | (The Bahamas) (Venezuela) | Devin Mullings; Yohny Romero | 2; 6 | 6; 4 | 7^{9} 6^{7} | 6; 3 |
| 5 | (The Bahamas) (Venezuela) | Timothy Neilly; Piero Luisi | 6; 1 | 6; 4 |

=== Paraguay vs. El Salvador ===
Paraguay
3
Yacht y Golf Club Paraguayo, Lambaré, Paraguay
8–10 February 2008
Clay

El Salvador
2

| | | | 1 | 2 | 3 | 4 | 5 |
|---|---|---|---|---|---|---|---|
| 1 | (Paraguay) (El Salvador) | Ramón Delgado; Marcelo Arévalo | 6; 1 | 6; 0 | 6; 2 |
| 2 | (Paraguay) (El Salvador) | Juan Carlos Ramírez; Rafael Arévalo | 3; 6 | 0; 6 | 0; 6 |
| 3 | (Paraguay) (El Salvador) | Juan-Enrique Crosa / Ramón Delgado; Rafael Arévalo / Marcelo Arévalo | 6^{3} 7^{7} | 5; 7 | 3; 6 |
| 4 | (Paraguay) (El Salvador) | Ramón Delgado; Rafael Arévalo | 6; 2 | 4; 6 | 6; 1 | 2; 6 | 6; 4 |
| 5 | (Paraguay) (El Salvador) | Juan Carlos Ramírez; Marcelo Arévalo | 3; 6 | 6; 1 | 6; 1 | 6; 3 |

== Second round ==
=== Ecuador vs. Dominican Republic ===
Ecuador
4
Guayaquil Tenis Club, Guayaquil, Ecuador
11–13 April 2008
Clay

Dominican Republic
1

| | | | 1 | 2 | 3 | 4 | 5 |
|---|---|---|---|---|---|---|---|
| 1 | (Ecuador) (Dominican Republic) | Julio César Campozano; Víctor Estrella Burgos | 7^{11} 6^{9} | 3; 6 | 6^{5} 7^{7} | 6; 3 | 6; 4 |
| 2 | (Ecuador) (Dominican Republic) | Nicolás Lapentti; Jhonson García | 6; 2 | 7; 5 | 6; 0 |
| 3 | (Ecuador) (Dominican Republic) | Carlos Avellán / Nicolás Lapentti; Víctor Estrella Burgos / Jhonson García | 6; 3 | 6; 2 | 3; 6 | 6; 1 |
| 4 | (Ecuador) (Dominican Republic) | Carlos Avellán; Luis Delgado | 6; 1 | 6; 0 |
| 5 | (Ecuador) (Dominican Republic) | Iván Endara; Jhonson García | 6; 3 | 3; 6 | 2; 6 |

=== Bahamas vs. Paraguay ===
Bahamas
1
National Tennis Center, Nassau, Bahamas
11–13 April 2008
Hard

Paraguay
4

| | | | 1 | 2 | 3 | 4 | 5 |
|---|---|---|---|---|---|---|---|
| 1 | (The Bahamas) (Paraguay) | Timothy Neilly; Ramón Delgado | 1; 6 | 0; 6 | 2; 6 |
| 2 | (The Bahamas) (Paraguay) | Devin Mullings; Ricardo Mena | 6; 3 | 6^{4} 7^{7} | 4; 6 | 4; 6 |
| 3 | (The Bahamas) (Paraguay) | Mark Knowles / Marvin Rolle; Juan-Enrique Crosa / Juan Carlos Ramírez | 6; 4 | 6; 3 | 6; 3 |
| 4 | (The Bahamas) (Paraguay) | Devin Mullings; Ramón Delgado | 2; 6 | 3; 6 | 4; 6 |
| 5 | (The Bahamas) (Paraguay) | Marvin Rolle; Juan Carlos Ramírez | 6; 0 | 4; 6 | 2; 6 |

== Relegation play-offs ==
=== Netherlands Antilles vs. Bolivia ===
Netherlands Antilles
3
S.O.V. Asiento, Curaçao, Netherlands Antilles
11–13 April 2008
Hard

Bolivia
2

| | | | 1 | 2 | 3 | 4 | 5 |
|---|---|---|---|---|---|---|---|
| 1 | (Netherlands Antilles) (Bolivia) | Romano Tatuhey; Mauricio Doria-Medina | 6; 3 | 6; 4 | 6; 4 |
| 2 | (Netherlands Antilles) (Bolivia) | Alexander Blom; José Roberto Velasco | 4; 6 | 2; 6 | 6; 0 | 6; 0 | 7; 5 |
| 3 | (Netherlands Antilles) (Bolivia) | Romano Tatuhey / Martijn van Haasteren; Diego Camacho / Mauricio Estívariz | 6; 3 | 6^{8} 7^{10} | 7^{7} 6^{5} | 6; 3 |
| 4 | (Netherlands Antilles) (Bolivia) | Alexander Blom; Mauricio Doria-Medina | 4; 6 | 3; 6 |
| 5 | (Netherlands Antilles) (Bolivia) | Nick Van Rosberg; Mauricio Estívariz | 1; 6 | 6^{2} 7^{7} |

=== Venezuela vs. El Salvador ===
Venezuela
4
Ciudad Olímpica de San Juan de Los Morros, San Juan de los Morros, Venezuela
11–13 April 2008
Hard

El Salvador
1

| | | | 1 | 2 | 3 | 4 | 5 |
|---|---|---|---|---|---|---|---|---|
| 1 | (Venezuela) (El Salvador) | Román Recarte; Rafael Arévalo | 3; 6 | 4; 6 | 3; 6 |
| 2 | (Venezuela) (El Salvador) | Yohny Romero; Marcelo Arévalo | 4; 6 | 6; 2 | 6; 4 | 2; 4 | | retired |
| 3 | (Venezuela) (El Salvador) | Piero Luisi / Roberto Maytín; Rafael Arévalo / César Escobar Serrano | 6; 1 | 6; 2 | 7; 5 |
| 4 | (Venezuela) (El Salvador) | Yohny Romero; Rafael Arévalo | 6; 1 | 6; 4 | 3; 6 | 6; 3 |
| 5 | (Venezuela) (El Salvador) | Piero Luisi; César Escobar Serrano | 6; 2 | 6; 2 |

== Third round ==
=== Paraguay vs. Ecuador ===
Paraguay
2
Polideportivo de la Cooperativa Lambaré, Lambaré, Paraguay
19–21 September 2008
Hard (indoors)

Ecuador
3

| | | | 1 | 2 | 3 | 4 | 5 |
|---|---|---|---|---|---|---|---|
| 1 | (Paraguay) (Ecuador) | Juan Carlos Ramírez; Nicolás Lapentti | 3; 6 | 1; 6 | 0; 6 |
| 2 | (Paraguay) (Ecuador) | Ramón Delgado; Julio César Campozano | 6; 3 | 6; 1 | 6; 1 |
| 3 | (Paraguay) (Ecuador) | Ramón Delgado / Gustavo Ramírez; Carlos Avellán / Nicolás Lapentti | 6; 1 | 2; 6 | 1; 6 | 5; 7 |
| 4 | (Paraguay) (Ecuador) | Ramón Delgado; Nicolás Lapentti | 6; 3 | 6; 4 | 6^{2} 7^{7} | 6^{4} 7^{7} | 4; 6 |
| 5 | (Paraguay) (Ecuador) | Gustavo Ramírez; Iván Endara | 4; 6 | 6; 4 | 6; 3 |

=== Group III ===
- Venue: Country Club, Tegucigalpa, Honduras (hard)
- Date: 16–20 July

| | Group A | BAR | JAM | HON |
| 1 | Barbados (2–0) | | 2–1 | 3–0 |
| 2 | Jamaica (1–1) | 1–2 | | 3–0 |
| 3 | Honduras (0–2) | 0–3 | 0–3 | |

| | Group B | GUA | PUR | PAN | ARU |
| 1 | Guatemala (3–0) | | 3–0 | 3–0 | 3–0 |
| 2 | Puerto Rico (2–1) | 0–3 | | 3–0 | 2–1 |
| 3 | Panama (1–2) | 0–3 | 0–3 | | 3–0 |
| 4 | Aruba (0–3) | 0–3 | 1–2 | 0–3 | |

Scores in italics carried over from groups

| | 1st–4th playoff | GUA | JAM | BAR | PUR |
| 1 | Guatemala (2–1) | | 1–2 | 2–1 | 3–0 |
| 2 | Jamaica (2–1) | 2–1 | | 1–2 | 2–1 |
| 3 | Barbados (1–2) | 1–2 | 2–1 | | 1–2 |
| 4 | Puerto Rico (1–2) | 0–3 | 1–2 | 2–1 | |

| | 5th–7th playoff | HON | PAN | ARU |
| 1 | Honduras (2–0) | | 2–1 | 2–0 |
| 2 | Panama (1–1) | 1–2 | | 3–0 |
| 3 | Aruba (0–2) | 0–2 | 0–3 | |

- Cuba withdrew from the tournament. They remained in Group III in 2009.
- Guatemala and Jamaica promoted to Group II in 2009
- Aruba and Panama relegated to Group IV in 2009

=== Group IV ===
The Americas Zone was one of the three zones of the regional Davis Cup competition in 2008.

In the Americas Zone there were four different tiers, called groups, in which teams competed against each other to advance to the upper tier. The four teams in Group IV played in a single Round-robin tournament. The top two teams were promoted to the Americas Zone Group III in 2009. All other teams remained in Group IV.

== Draw ==
- Venue: Country Club, Tegucigalpa, Honduras (hard)
- Date: 16–18 July
- Withdrawn: Trinidad and Tobago

| | | CRC | HAI | BER | ISV |
| 1 | Costa Rica (3–0) | | 2–1 | 3–0 | 2–0 |
| 2 | Haiti (2–1) | 1–2 | | 2–0 | 2–1 |
| 3 | Bermuda (1–2) | 0–3 | 0–2 | | 3–0 |
| 4 | U.S. Virgin Islands (0–3) | 0–2 | 1–2 | 0–3 | |

- Costa Rica and Haiti promoted to Group III in 2009.

== Results ==
=== Bermuda vs. Costa Rica ===
Bermuda
0
Country Club, Tegucigalpa, Honduras
16 July 2008
Hard

Costa Rica
3

| | | | 1 | 2 | 3 |
|---|---|---|---|---|---|
| 1 | (Bermuda) (Costa Rica) | Jenson Bascome; Ignaci Roca | 4; 6 | 1; 6 |
| 2 | (Bermuda) (Costa Rica) | Gavin Manders; Federico Chavarría | 2; 6 | 0; 6 |
| 3 | (Bermuda) (Costa Rica) | Jordan Talbot / David Thomas; Federico Chavarría / Fernando Martínez Manrique | 3; 6 | 1; 6 |

=== Haiti vs. U.S. Virgin Islands ===
Haiti
2
Country Club, Tegucigalpa, Honduras
16 July 2008
Hard

U.S. Virgin Islands
1

| | | | 1 | 2 | 3 |
|---|---|---|---|---|---|
| 1 | (Haiti) (United States Virgin Islands) | Jean Marc Bazanne; Kristepher Elien | 6^{2} 7^{7} | 2; 6 |
| 2 | (Haiti) (United States Virgin Islands) | Olivier Sajous; Kevin Motta | 6; 4 | 6; 1 |
| 3 | (Haiti) (United States Virgin Islands) | Ronald Agénor / Olivier Sajous; Kristepher Elien / Henry Christian Nelthropp | 6; 3 | 6; 3 |

=== Bermuda vs. U.S. Virgin Islands ===
Bermuda
3
Country Club, Tegucigalpa, Honduras
17 July 2008
Hard

U.S. Virgin Islands
0

| | | | 1 | 2 | 3 |
|---|---|---|---|---|---|
| 1 | (Bermuda) (United States Virgin Islands) | Jenson Bascome; Kristepher Elien | 7^{7} 6^{4} | 6; 1 |
| 2 | (Bermuda) (United States Virgin Islands) | Gavin Manders; Kevin Motta | 6; 0 | 6; 1 |
| 3 | (Bermuda) (United States Virgin Islands) | Jordan Talbot / David Thomas; Henry Christian Nelthropp / Alric Kevin Plaskett | 6; 3 | 7; 5 |

=== Costa Rica vs. Haiti ===
Costa Rica
2
Country Club, Tegucigalpa, Honduras
17 July 2008
Hard

Haiti
1

| | | | 1 | 2 | 3 |
|---|---|---|---|---|---|
| 1 | (Costa Rica) (Haiti) | Ignaci Roca; Jean Marc Bazanne | 4; 6 | 4; 6 |
| 2 | (Costa Rica) (Haiti) | Federico Chavarría; Olivier Sajous | 6; 2 | 6; 3 |
| 3 | (Costa Rica) (Haiti) | Federico Chavarría / Fernando Martínez Manrique; Jean Marc Bazanne / Olivier Sajous | 7^{7} 6^{2} | 2; 6 | 6; 2 |

=== Bermuda vs. Haiti ===
Bermuda
0
Country Club, Tegucigalpa, Honduras
18 July 2008
Hard

Haiti
2

| | | | 1 | 2 | 3 |
|---|---|---|---|---|---|
| 1 | (Bermuda) (Haiti) | Jenson Bascome; Jean Marc Bazanne | 2; 6 | 4; 6 |
| 2 | (Bermuda) (Haiti) | Gavin Manders; Olivier Sajous | 3; 6 | 2; 6 |
| 3 | (Bermuda) (Haiti) |

=== Costa Rica vs. U.S. Virgin Islands ===
Costa Rica
2
Country Club, Tegucigalpa, Honduras
18 July 2008
Hard

U.S. Virgin Islands
0

| | | | 1 | 2 | 3 |
|---|---|---|---|---|---|
| 1 | (Costa Rica) (United States Virgin Islands) | Federico Chavarría; Kristepher Elien | 6; 0 | 6; 3 |
| 2 | (Costa Rica) (United States Virgin Islands) | Pablo Núñez; Kevin Motta | 6; 3 | 6; 3 |
| 3 | (Costa Rica) (United States Virgin Islands) |

== Asia/Oceania Zone ==
=== Group I ===
Second-round play-offs
Astana, Kazakhstan (indoor clay)
Kazakhstan | 5
Philippines | 0

First-round play-offs
Almaty, Kazakhstan (indoor hard)
Chinese Taipei | 3
Kazakhstan | 2
Manila, Philippines (indoor clay)
Uzbekistan | 3
Philippines | 2

First Round
Kaohsiung, Taiwan (hard)
1 | Australia | 4
Chinese Taipei | 1
Almaty, Kazakhstan (indoor hard)
3 | Thailand | 3
Kazakhstan | 2
New Delhi, India (grass)
Uzbekistan | 2
4 | India | 3
Manila, Philippines (hard)
Philippines | 0
2 | Japan | 5

Second Round
Townsville, Australia (indoor hard)
1 | Australia | 5
3 | Thailand | 0
New Delhi, India (grass)
4 | India | 3
2 | Japan | 2

- Philippines relegated to Group II in 2009.
- Australia and India advance to World Group play-off.

=== Group II ===
Play-offs
Hong Kong, China (hard)
Lebanon | 2
Hong Kong | 3
Muscat, Oman (hard)
Oman | 3
Pacific Oceania | 2

First Round
Beijing, China (indoor hard)
1 | China | 5
Lebanon | 0
Jakarta, Indonesia (hard)
3 | Indonesia | 3
Hong Kong | 2
Muscat, Oman (hard)
Oman | 0
4 | New Zealand | 5
Mishref, Kuwait (hard)
Pacific Oceania | 1
2 | Kuwait | 4

Second Round
Jakarta, Indonesia (hard)
1 | China | 3
3 | Indonesia | 2
Mishref, Kuwait (hard)
4 | New Zealand | 5
2 | Kuwait | 0

Third Round
New Plymouth, New Zealand (indoor hard)
1 | China | 3
4 | New Zealand | 2

- Lebanon and Pacific Oceania relegated to Group III in 2009.
- China promoted to Group I in 2009.

=== Group III ===
- Venue: Enghelab Sports Complex, Tehran, Iran (clay)
- Date: 9–13 April

| | Group A | PAK | SYR | VIE | UAE |
| 1 | Pakistan (3–0) | | 3–0 | 3–0 | 3–0 |
| 2 | Syria (2–1) | 0–3 | | 2–1 | 3–0 |
| 3 | Vietnam (1–2) | 0–3 | 1–2 | | 3–0 |
| 4 | United Arab Emirates (0–3) | 0–3 | 0–3 | 0–3 | |

| | Group B | MAS | IRI | SRI | TJK |
| 1 | Malaysia (3–0) | | 2–1 | 2–1 | 2–1 |
| 2 | Iran (2–1) | 1–2 | | 2–1 | 3–0 |
| 3 | Sri Lanka (1–2) | 1–2 | 1–2 | | 2–1 |
| 4 | Tajikistan (0–3) | 1–2 | 0–3 | 1–2 | |

Top two teams advance to 1st–4th Play-off, bottom two teams advance to 5th–8th Play-off. Scores in italics carried over from pools.

| | 1st–4th Play-off | PAK | MAS | SYR | IRI |
| 1 | Pakistan (3–0) | | 3–0 | 3–0 | 3–0 |
| 2 | Malaysia (2–1) | 0–3 | | 3–0 | 2–1 |
| 3 | Syria (1–2) | 0–3 | 0–3 | | 2–1 |
| 4 | Iran (0–3) | 0–3 | 1–2 | 1–2 | |

| | 5th–8th Play-off | SRI | TJK | VIE | UAE |
| 1 | Sri Lanka (3–0) | | 2–1 | 3–0 | 3–0 |
| 2 | Tajikistan (2–1) | 1–2 | | 3–0 | 2–1 |
| 3 | Vietnam (1–2) | 0–3 | 0–3 | | 3–0 |
| 4 | United Arab Emirates (0–3) | 0–3 | 1–2 | 0–3 | |

- Pakistan and Malaysia promoted to Group II in 2009.
- Vietnam and United Arab Emirates relegated to Group IV in 2009.

=== Group IV ===
- Venue: National Tennis Centre, Hassanal Bolkiah National Sports Complex, Bandar Seri Begawan, Brunei (hard)
- Date: 9–13 April

| | Pool A | SIN | MYA | BHR | IRQ | BRU |
| 1 | Singapore (4–0) | | 2–1 | 2–1 | 3–0 | 3–0 |
| 2 | Myanmar (3–1) | 1–2 | | 2–1 | 2–1 | 3–0 |
| 3 | Bahrain (2–2) | 1–2 | 1–2 | | 3–0 | 3–0 |
| 4 | Iraq (1–3) | 0–3 | 1–2 | 0–3 | | 3–0 |
| 5 | Brunei (0–4) | 0–3 | 0–3 | 0–3 | 0–3 | |

| | Pool B | KSA | BAN | JOR | TKM | MGL | QAT |
| 1 | Saudi Arabia (5–0) | | 2–1 | 3–0 | 3–0 | 3–0 | 3–0 |
| 2 | Bangladesh (4–1) | 1–2 | | 2–1 | 2–1 | 3–0 | 3–0 |
| 3 | Jordan (3–2) | 0–3 | 1–2 | | 2–1 | 2–1 | 3–0 |
| 4 | Turkmenistan (2–3) | 0–3 | 1–2 | 1–2 | | 2–1 | 2–1 |
| 5 | Mongolia (1–4) | 0–3 | 0–3 | 1–2 | 1–2 | | 2–1 |
| 6 | Qatar (0–5) | 0–3 | 0–3 | 0–3 | 1–2 | 1–2 | |

- Singapore and Saudi Arabia promoted to Group III in 2009.

== Europe/Africa Zone ==
=== Group I ===
Second Round Play-offs
Montecatini, Italy (clay)
Italy | 3
Latvia | 2
Minsk, Belarus (hard)
3 | Belarus | 3
Georgia | 0

First Round Play-offs
Italy
bye
bye
Latvia
Minsk, Belarus (hard)
Poland | 4
3 | Belarus | 1
Georgia
bye

First round
1 | Croatia
bye
Italy
bye
4 | Netherlands
bye
Skopje, Macedonia (indoor clay)
Latvia | 1
Macedonia | 4
Kreuzlingen, Switzerland (indoor hard)
Switzerland | 4
Poland | 1
bye
3 | Belarus
bye
Georgia
bye
2 | Slovakia

Second round
Dubrovnik, Croatia (indoor hard)
1 | Croatia | 3
Italy | 2
Skopje, Macedonia (clay)
4 | Netherlands | 4
Macedonia | 1
Minsk, Belarus (indoor carpet)
Switzerland | 4
3 | Belarus | 1
Bratislava, Slovakia (indoor clay)
Georgia | 1
2 | Slovakia | 4

- Latvia and Georgia relegated to Group II in 2009.
- Croatia, Netherlands, Switzerland, and Slovakia advance to World Group Play-off.

=== Group II ===
Play-offs
Hanko, Finland (clay)
1 | Luxembourg | 2
7 | Finland | 3
Thessaloniki, Greece (clay)
3 | Hungary | 5
Greece | 0
Cairo, Egypt (clay)
Egypt | 3
4 | Morocco | 2
Tunis, Tunisia (clay)
8 | Slovenia | 4
Tunisia | 1

First round
Esch-sur-Alzette, Luxembourg (indoor hard)
1 | Luxembourg | 0
Denmark | 5
Helsinki, Finland (indoor hard)
7 | Finland | 1
South Africa | 4
Algiers, Algeria (clay)
3 | Hungary | 2
Algeria | 3
Roquebrune-Cap-Martin, France (clay)
5 | Monaco | 3
Greece | 2
Cherkasy, Ukraine (indoor hard)
Egypt | 0
6 | Ukraine | 5
Dublin, Ireland (indoor carpet)
Ireland | 3
4 | Morocco | 2
Nicosia, Cyprus (hard)
Cyprus | 3
8 | Slovenia | 2
Estoril, Portugal (clay)
Tunisia | 1
2 | Portugal | 4

Second round
Johannesburg, South Africa (hard)
Denmark | 0
South Africa | 5
Roquebrune-Cap-Martin, France (clay)
Algeria | 0
5 | Monaco | 5
Dublin, Ireland (grass)
6 | Ukraine | 3
Ireland | 2
Porto, Portugal (clay)
Cyprus | 0
2 | Portugal | 5

Third round
Roquebrune-Cap-Martin, France (clay)
South Africa | 3
5 | Monaco | 2
Dnipropetrovsk, Ukraine (indoor hard)
6 | Ukraine | 5
2 | Portugal | 0

- Luxembourg, Greece, Morocco, and Tunisia relegated to Group III in 2009.
- South Africa and Ukraine promoted to Group I in 2009.

=== Group III ===
==== Zone A ====
The Europe/Africa Zone was one of the three zones of the regional Davis Cup competition in 2008.

In the Europe/Africa Zone there were four different tiers, called groups, in which teams competed against each other to advance to the upper tier. Group III was split into two tournaments. One tournament was held in Tennis Club Lokomotiv, Plovdiv, Bulgaria, April 9–13, on outdoor clay courts, while the other was held in Master Class Tennis and Fitness Club, Yerevan, Armenia, May 7–11, also on outdoor clay courts.

== Format ==
Botswana and Nigeria withdrew from the Plovdiv tournament. They remained in Group III in 2009. The six remaining teams in the Plovdiv tournament played in a round-robin format. The top two teams were promoted to the Europe/Africa Zone Group II in 2009. The bottom two teams were demoted to the Europe/Africa Zone Group IV in 2009.

== Draw ==
- Venue: Tennis Club Lokomotiv, Plovdiv, Bulgaria (clay)
- Date: 9–13 April
- Withdrawn: Botswana and Nigeria

| | Zone A | BUL | MNE | TUR | MAD | CIV | ZIM |
| 1 | Bulgaria (5–0) | | 3–0 | 3–0 | 2–1 | 3–0 | 3–0 |
| 2 | Montenegro (4–1) | 0–3 | | 2–1 | 2–1 | 3–0 | 3–0 |
| 3 | Turkey (3–2) | 0–3 | 1–2 | | 3–0 | 3–0 | 3–0 |
| 4 | Madagascar (2–3) | 1–2 | 1–2 | 0–3 | | 3–0 | 3–0 |
| 5 | Ivory Coast (1–4) | 0–3 | 0–3 | 0–3 | 0–3 | | 2–1 |
| 6 | Zimbabwe (0–5) | 0–3 | 0–3 | 0–3 | 0–3 | 1–2 | |

- Bulgaria and Montenegro promoted to Group II in 2009.
- Ivory Coast and Zimbabwe relegated to Group IV in 2009.

== Results ==
=== Bulgaria vs. Montenegro ===
Bulgaria
3
Tennis Club Lokomotiv, Plovdiv, Bulgaria
8 April 2008
Clay

Montenegro
0

| | | | 1 | 2 | 3 |
|---|---|---|---|---|---|
| 1 | (Bulgaria) (Montenegro) | Grigor Dimitrov; Daniel Danilović | 7; 5 | 6; 4 |
| 2 | (Bulgaria) (Montenegro) | Todor Enev; Goran Tošić | 6; 4 | 6; 0 |
| 3 | (Bulgaria) (Montenegro) | Tihomir Grozdanov / Simeon Ivanov; Daniel Danilović / Nemanja Kontić | 7^{7} 6^{2} | 6; 4 |

=== Ivory Coast vs. Madagascar ===
Ivory Coast
0
Tennis Club Lokomotiv, Plovdiv, Bulgaria
8 April 2008
Clay

Madagascar
3

| | | | 1 | 2 | 3 |
|---|---|---|---|---|---|
| 1 | (Ivory Coast) (Madagascar) | Charles Irie; Jacob Rasolondrazana | 7; 5 | 2; 6 | 4; 6 |
| 2 | (Ivory Coast) (Madagascar) | Valentin Sanon; Tony Rajaobelina | 7^{7} 6^{5} | 1; 6 | 0; 6 |
| 3 | (Ivory Coast) (Madagascar) | Claude N'Goran / Lavry Sylvain N'Yaba; Tony Rajaobelina / Germain Rasolondrazana | 4; 6 | 6; 2 | 3; 6 |

=== Turkey vs. Zimbabwe ===
Turkey
3
Tennis Club Lokomotiv, Plovdiv, Bulgaria
8 April 2008
Clay

Zimbabwe
0

| | | | 1 | 2 | 3 |
|---|---|---|---|---|---|
| 1 | (Turkey) (Zimbabwe) | Haluk Akkoyun; Takanyi Garanganga | 6; 3 | 6; 2 |
| 2 | (Turkey) (Zimbabwe) | Marsel İlhan; Mlandeli Ndlela | 6; 0 | 6; 1 |
| 3 | (Turkey) (Zimbabwe) | Haluk Akkoyun / Ergün Zorlu; Mark Fynn / Mlandeli Ndlela | 6; 3 | 7; 5 |

=== Bulgaria vs. Ivory Coast ===
Bulgaria
3
Tennis Club Lokomotiv, Plovdiv, Bulgaria
9 April 2008
Clay

Ivory Coast
0

| | | | 1 | 2 | 3 |
|---|---|---|---|---|---|
| 1 | (Bulgaria) (Ivory Coast) | Grigor Dimitrov; Charles Irie | 6; 1 | 6; 1 |
| 2 | (Bulgaria) (Ivory Coast) | Todor Enev; Lavry Sylvain N'Yaba | 6; 1 | 6; 2 |
| 3 | (Bulgaria) (Ivory Coast) | Tihomir Grozdanov / Simeon Ivanov; Charles Irie / Claude N'Goran | 4; 6 | 6; 2 | 6; 0 |

=== Madagascar vs. Turkey ===
Madagascar
0
Tennis Club Lokomotiv, Plovdiv, Bulgaria
9 April 2008
Clay

Turkey
3

| | | | 1 | 2 | 3 |
|---|---|---|---|---|---|
| 1 | (Madagascar) (Turkey) | Jacob Rasolondrazana; Haluk Akkoyun | 7^{7} 6^{3} | 1; 6 | 0; 6 |
| 2 | (Madagascar) (Turkey) | Tony Rajaobelina; Marsel İlhan | 6; 4 | 2; 6 | 1; 6 |
| 3 | (Madagascar) (Turkey) | Germain Rasolondrazana / Jacob Rasolondrazana; Serkan-Akın Dilek / Ergün Zorlu | 6; 2 | 3; 6 | 4; 6 |

=== Montenegro vs. Zimbabwe ===
Montenegro
3
Tennis Club Lokomotiv, Plovdiv, Bulgaria
9 April 2008
Clay

Zimbabwe
0

| | | | 1 | 2 | 3 |
|---|---|---|---|---|---|
| 1 | (Montenegro) (Zimbabwe) | Marko Begović; Takanyi Garanganga | 7^{10} 6^{8} | 6; 1 |
| 2 | (Montenegro) (Zimbabwe) | Goran Tošić; Mlandeli Ndlela | 6; 1 | 6; 3 |
| 3 | (Montenegro) (Zimbabwe) | Daniel Danilović / Nemanja Kontić; Mark Fynn / Mlandeli Ndlela | 6; 4 | 6; 2 |

=== Bulgaria vs. Madagascar ===
Bulgaria
2
Tennis Club Lokomotiv, Plovdiv, Bulgaria
10 April 2008
Clay

Madagascar
1

| | | | 1 | 2 | 3 |
|---|---|---|---|---|---|
| 1 | (Bulgaria) (Madagascar) | Grigor Dimitrov; Jacob Rasolondrazana | 6; 3 | 6; 3 |
| 2 | (Bulgaria) (Madagascar) | Todor Enev; Tony Rajaobelina | 3; 6 | 2; 6 |
| 3 | (Bulgaria) (Madagascar) | Grigor Dimitrov / Todor Enev; Tony Rajaobelina / Germain Rasolondrazana | 6; 1 | 6; 3 |

=== Ivory Coast vs. Zimbabwe ===
Ivory Coast
2
Tennis Club Lokomotiv, Plovdiv, Bulgaria
10 April 2008
Clay

Zimbabwe
1

| | | | 1 | 2 | 3 |
|---|---|---|---|---|---|
| 1 | (Ivory Coast) (Zimbabwe) | Charles Irie; Mark Fynn | 7; 5 | 6; 2 |
| 2 | (Ivory Coast) (Zimbabwe) | Lavry Sylvain N'Yaba; Mlandeli Ndlela | 5; 7 | 6; 1 | 7^{7} 6^{3} |
| 3 | (Ivory Coast) (Zimbabwe) | Charles Irie / Lavry Sylvain N'Yaba; Mark Fynn / Mlandeli Ndlela | 4; 6 | 5; 7 |

=== Montenegro vs. Turkey ===
Montenegro
2
Tennis Club Lokomotiv, Plovdiv, Bulgaria
10 April 2008
Clay

Turkey
1

| | | | 1 | 2 | 3 |
|---|---|---|---|---|---|
| 1 | (Montenegro) (Turkey) | Daniel Danilović; Haluk Akkoyun | 6; 4 | 6^{7} 7^{9} | 7; 5 |
| 2 | (Montenegro) (Turkey) | Goran Tošić; Marsel İlhan | 5; 7 | 6^{11} 7^{13} |
| 3 | (Montenegro) (Turkey) | Daniel Danilović / Goran Tošić; Marsel İlhan / Ergün Zorlu | 6; 4 | 7^{9} 6^{7} |

=== Bulgaria vs. Turkey ===
Bulgaria
3
Tennis Club Lokomotiv, Plovdiv, Bulgaria
11 April 2008
Clay

Turkey
0

| | | | 1 | 2 | 3 |
|---|---|---|---|---|---|
| 1 | (Bulgaria) (Turkey) | Grigor Dimitrov; Ergün Zorlu | 6; 0 | 6; 3 |
| 2 | (Bulgaria) (Turkey) | Todor Enev; Marsel İlhan | 6; 2 | 6; 3 |
| 3 | (Bulgaria) (Turkey) | Tihomir Grozdanov / Simeon Ivanov; Haluk Akkoyun / Ergün Zorlu | 6; 3 | 7^{7} 6^{5} |

=== Ivory Coast vs. Montenegro ===
Ivory Coast
0
Tennis Club Lokomotiv, Plovdiv, Bulgaria
11 April 2008
Clay

Montenegro
3

| | | | 1 | 2 | 3 |
|---|---|---|---|---|---|
| 1 | (Ivory Coast) (Montenegro) | Charles Irie; Daniel Danilović | 1; 6 | 4; 6 |
| 2 | (Ivory Coast) (Montenegro) | Lavry Sylvain N'Yaba; Goran Tošić | 3; 6 | 0; 6 |
| 3 | (Ivory Coast) (Montenegro) | Charles Irie / Lavry Sylvain N'Yaba; Daniel Danilović / Goran Tošić | 1; 6 | 3; 6 |

=== Madagascar vs. Zimbabwe ===
Madagascar
3
Tennis Club Lokomotiv, Plovdiv, Bulgaria
11 April 2008
Clay

Zimbabwe
0

| | | | 1 | 2 | 3 |
|---|---|---|---|---|---|
| 1 | (Madagascar) (Zimbabwe) | Thierry Rajaobelina; Mark Fynn | 6; 2 | 6; 1 |
| 2 | (Madagascar) (Zimbabwe) | Jacob Rasolondrazana; Mlandeli Ndlela | 6; 2 | 6; 2 |
| 3 | (Madagascar) (Zimbabwe) | Thierry Rajaobelina / Germain Rasolondrazana; Mark Fynn / Takanyi Garanganga | 6; 1 | 7; 5 |

=== Bulgaria vs. Zimbabwe ===
Bulgaria
3
Tennis Club Lokomotiv, Plovdiv, Bulgaria
12 April 2008
Clay

Zimbabwe
0

| | | | 1 | 2 | 3 |
|---|---|---|---|---|---|
| 1 | (Bulgaria) (Zimbabwe) | Grigor Dimitrov; Takanyi Garanganga | 6; 3 | 6; 2 |
| 2 | (Bulgaria) (Zimbabwe) | Simeon Ivanov; Mlandeli Ndlela | 6; 1 | 6; 2 |
| 3 | (Bulgaria) (Zimbabwe) | Tihomir Grozdanov / Simeon Ivanov; Mark Fynn / Mlandeli Ndlela | 6; 4 | 6; 1 |

=== Ivory Coast vs. Turkey ===
Ivory Coast
0
Tennis Club Lokomotiv, Plovdiv, Bulgaria
12 April 2008
Clay

Turkey
3

| | | | 1 | 2 | 3 |
|---|---|---|---|---|---|
| 1 | (Ivory Coast) (Turkey) | Charles Irie; Haluk Akkoyun | 3; 6 | 7; 5 | 4; 6 |
| 2 | (Ivory Coast) (Turkey) | Lavry Sylvain N'Yaba; Marsel İlhan | 4; 6 | 6^{7} 7^{9} |
| 3 | (Ivory Coast) (Turkey) | Charles Irie / Lavry Sylvain N'Yaba; Haluk Akkoyun / Ergün Zorlu | 7^{7} 6^{5} | 2; 6 | 3; 6 |

=== Madagascar vs. Montenegro ===
Madagascar
1
Tennis Club Lokomotiv, Plovdiv, Bulgaria
12 April 2008
Clay

Montenegro
2

| | | | 1 | 2 | 3 |
|---|---|---|---|---|---|
| 1 | (Madagascar) (Montenegro) | Thierry Rajaobelina; Daniel Danilović | 2; 6 | 6^{5} 7^{7} |
| 2 | (Madagascar) (Montenegro) | Jacob Rasolondrazana; Goran Tošić | 1; 6 | 2; 6 |
| 3 | (Madagascar) (Montenegro) | Thierry Rajaobelina / Germain Rasolondrazana; Marko Begović / Nemanja Kontić | 7^{7} 6^{3} | 6; 4 |

==== Zone B ====
- Venue: Master Class Tennis and Fitness Club, Yerevan, Armenia (clay)
- Date: 7–11 May

| | Pool A | MDA | NOR | ARM | AND |
| 1 | Moldova (3–0) | | 2–1 | 3–0 | 3–0 |
| 2 | Norway (2–1) | 1–2 | | 3–0 | 3–0 |
| 3 | Armenia (1–2) | 0–3 | 0–3 | | 2–1 |
| 4 | Andorra (0–3) | 0–3 | 0–3 | 1–2 | |

| | Pool B | BIH | LTU | EST | GHA |
| 1 | Bosnia and Herzegovina (2–1, 7R) | | 1–2 | 3–0 | 3–0 |
| 2 | Lithuania (2–1, 6R) | 2–1 | | 1–2 | 3–0 |
| 3 | Estonia (2–1, 5R) | 0–3 | 2–1 | | 3–0 |
| 4 | Ghana (0–3) | 0–3 | 0–3 | 0–3 | |

Scores in italics carried over from pools.

| | 1st–4th Play-off | MDA | LTU | NOR | BIH |
| 1 | Moldova (3–0) | | 3–0 | 2–1 | 3–0 |
| 2 | Lithuania (2–1) | 0–3 | | 2–1 | 2–1 |
| 3 | Norway (1–2) | 1–2 | 1–2 | | 2–1 |
| 4 | Bosnia and Herzegovina (0–3) | 0–3 | 1–2 | 1–2 | |

| | 5th–8th Play-off | EST | AND | ARM | GHA |
| 1 | Estonia (3–0) | | 3–0 | 3–0 | 3–0 |
| 2 | Andorra (1–2, 4R) | 0–3 | | 1–2 | 3–0 |
| 3 | Armenia (1–2, 3R) | 0–3 | 2–1 | | 1–2 |
| 4 | Ghana (1–2, 2R) | 0–3 | 0–3 | 2–1 | |

Note: Tie between Bosnia & Herzegovina, Lithuania, and Estonia (Pool B) broken on number of rubbers won. Tie between Andorra, Armenia, and Ghana (6th–8th) broken on number of rubbers won.

- Moldova and Lithuania promoted to Group II for 2009.
- Armenia and Ghana relegated to Group IV for 2009.

The Europe/Africa Zone was one of the three zones of the regional Davis Cup competition in 2008.

In the Europe/Africa Zone there were four different tiers, called groups, in which teams competed against each other to advance to the upper tier. Group III was split into two tournaments. One tournament was held in Tennis Club Lokomotiv, Plovdiv, Bulgaria, April 9–13, on outdoor clay courts, while the other was held in Master Class Tennis and Fitness Club, Yerevan, Armenia, May 7–11, also on outdoor clay courts.

== Format ==
The eight teams in the Yerevan tournament were split into two pools and played in a round-robin format. The top two teams of each pool advanced to the promotion pool, from which the two top teams were promoted to the Europe/Africa Zone Group II in 2009. The bottom two teams of each group were placed in the relegation pool, from which the two bottom teams were demoted to the Europe/Africa Zone Group IV in 2009.

== Pool A ==
| | Pool A | MDA | NOR | ARM | AND |
| 1 | Moldova (3–0) | | 2–1 | 3–0 | 3–0 |
| 2 | Norway (2–1) | 1–2 | | 3–0 | 3–0 |
| 3 | Armenia (1–2) | 0–3 | 0–3 | | 2–1 |
| 4 | Andorra (0–3) | 0–3 | 0–3 | 1–2 | |

=== Andorra vs. Norway ===
Andorra
0
Master Class Tennis and Fitness Club, Yerevan, Armenia
7 May 2008
Clay

Norway
3

| | | | 1 | 2 | 3 |
|---|---|---|---|---|---|
| 1 | (Andorra) (Norway) | Jordi Vila-Vila; Frederik Sletting-Johnsen | 5; 7 | 4; 6 |
| 2 | (Andorra) (Norway) | Jean-Baptiste Poux-Gautier; Stian Boretti | 6; 3 | 5; 7 | 1; 2 |
| 3 | (Andorra) (Norway) | Hector Hormigo-Herrera / Jordi Vila-Vila; Stian Boretti / Philip Riise-Hansen | 1; 6 | 0; 6 |

=== Armenia vs. Moldova ===
Armenia
0
Master Class Tennis and Fitness Club, Yerevan, Armenia
7 May 2008
Clay

Moldova
3

| | | | 1 | 2 | 3 |
|---|---|---|---|---|---|
| 1 | (Armenia) (Moldova) | Hovhannes Davtyan; Andrei Gorban | 2; 6 | 2; 6 |
| 2 | (Armenia) (Moldova) | Harutyun Sofyan; Roman Borvanov | 2; 6 | 4; 6 |
| 3 | (Armenia) (Moldova) | Harutyun Sofyan / Hayk Zohranyan; Andrei Ciumac / Andrei Gorban | 5; 7 | 4; 6 |

=== Andorra vs. Armenia ===
Andorra
1
Master Class Tennis and Fitness Club, Yerevan, Armenia
8 May 2008
Clay

Armenia
2

| | | | 1 | 2 | 3 |
|---|---|---|---|---|---|
| 1 | (Andorra) (Armenia) | Jordi Vila-Vila; Hovhannes Davtyan | 4; 6 | 6; 4 | 6; 4 |
| 2 | (Andorra) (Armenia) | Jean-Baptiste Poux-Gautier; Harutyun Sofyan | 5; 7 | 6^{5} 7^{7} |
| 3 | (Andorra) (Armenia) | Jean-Baptiste Poux-Gautier / Jordi Vila-Vila; Harutyun Sofyan / Hayk Zohranyan | 4; 6 | 2; 6 |

=== Moldova vs. Norway ===
Moldova
2
Master Class Tennis and Fitness Club, Yerevan, Armenia
8 May 2008
Clay

Norway
1

| | | | 1 | 2 | 3 |
|---|---|---|---|---|---|
| 1 | (Moldova) (Norway) | Andrei Gorban; Philip Riise-Hansen | 6; 4 | 6; 1 |
| 2 | (Moldova) (Norway) | Roman Borvanov; Stian Boretti | 3; 6 | 3; 6 |
| 3 | (Moldova) (Norway) | Roman Borvanov / Andrei Ciumac; Stian Boretti / Philip Riise-Hansen | 6; 3 | 6^{4} 7^{7} | 6; 3 |

=== Andorra vs. Moldova ===
Andorra
0
Master Class Tennis and Fitness Club, Yerevan, Armenia
9 May 2008
Clay

Moldova
3

| | | | 1 | 2 | 3 |
|---|---|---|---|---|---|---|
| 1 | (Andorra) (Moldova) | Hector Hormigo-Herrera; Andrei Gorban | 1; 6 | 2; 6 |
| 2 | (Andorra) (Moldova) | Jean-Baptiste Poux-Gautier; Roman Borvanov | 3; 4 | | | retired |
| 3 | (Andorra) (Moldova) | Jean-Baptiste Poux-Gautier / Jordi Vila-Vila; Radu Albot / Andrei Gorban | | | | w/o |

=== Armenia vs. Norway ===
Armenia
0
Master Class Tennis and Fitness Club, Yerevan, Armenia
9 May 2008
Clay

Norway
3

| | | | 1 | 2 | 3 |
|---|---|---|---|---|---|
| 1 | (Armenia) (Norway) | Hayk Zohranyan; Philip Riise-Hansen | 0; 6 | 0; 6 |
| 2 | (Armenia) (Norway) | Harutyun Sofyan; Stian Boretti | 3; 6 | 3; 6 |
| 3 | (Armenia) (Norway) | Hovhannes Davtyan / Roman Yedigaryan; Fredrik Ask / Frederik Sletting-Johnsen | 3; 6 | 3; 6 |

== Pool B ==
| | Pool B | BIH | LTU | EST | GHA |
| 1 | Bosnia and Herzegovina (2–1, 7R) | | 1–2 | 3–0 | 3–0 |
| 2 | Lithuania (2–1, 6R) | 2–1 | | 1–2 | 3–0 |
| 3 | Estonia (2–1, 5R) | 0–3 | 2–1 | | 3–0 |
| 4 | Ghana (0–3) | 0–3 | 0–3 | 0–3 | |

Note: Tie between Bosnia & Herzegovina, Lithuania, and Estonia broken on number of rubbers won.

=== Lithuania vs. Estonia ===
Lithuania
1
Master Class Tennis and Fitness Club, Yerevan, Armenia
7 May 2008
Clay

Estonia
2

| | | | 1 | 2 | 3 |
|---|---|---|---|---|---|
| 1 | (Lithuania) (Estonia) | Laurynas Grigelis; Vladimir Ivanov | 2; 6 | 6^{5} 7^{7} |
| 2 | (Lithuania) (Estonia) | Gvidas Sabeckis; Mait Künnap | 3; 6 | 3; 6 |
| 3 | (Lithuania) (Estonia) | Daniel Lencina-Ribes / Gvidas Sabeckis; Mait Künnap / Jürgen Zopp | 6; 4 | 7^{7} 6^{4} |

=== Bosnia and Herzegovina vs. Ghana ===
Bosnia and Herzegovina
3
Master Class Tennis and Fitness Club, Yerevan, Armenia
7 May 2008
Clay

Ghana
0

| | | | 1 | 2 | 3 |
|---|---|---|---|---|---|
| 1 | (Bosnia and Herzegovina) (Ghana) | Aleksandar Marić; Emmanuel Mensah | 3; 6 | 6; 3 | 6; 4 |
| 2 | (Bosnia and Herzegovina) (Ghana) | Aldin Šetkić; Mohammed Salifu | 6; 3 | 3; 6 | 6; 3 |
| 3 | (Bosnia and Herzegovina) (Ghana) | Mirza Bašić / Tomislav Brkić; Emmanuel Mensah / Mohammed Salifu | 6; 4 | 7^{8} 6^{6} |

=== Lithuania vs. Ghana ===
Lithuania
3
Master Class Tennis and Fitness Club, Yerevan, Armenia
8 May 2008
Clay

Ghana
0

| | | | 1 | 2 | 3 |
|---|---|---|---|---|---|
| 1 | (Lithuania) (Ghana) | Daniel Lencina-Ribes; Emmanuel Mensah | 6; 4 | 6; 0 |
| 2 | (Lithuania) (Ghana) | Gvidas Sabeckis; Mohammed Salifu | 6; 3 | 6; 4 |
| 3 | (Lithuania) (Ghana) | Daniel Lencina-Ribes / Gvidas Sabeckis; Menford Owusu / Mohammed Salifu | 6; 2 | 4; 6 | 6; 3 |

=== Bosnia and Herzegovina vs. Estonia ===
Bosnia and Herzegovina
3
Master Class Tennis and Fitness Club, Yerevan, Armenia
8 May 2008
Clay

Estonia
0

| | | | 1 | 2 | 3 |
|---|---|---|---|---|---|
| 1 | (Bosnia and Herzegovina) (Estonia) | Aleksandar Marić; Jürgen Zopp | 6; 2 | 6; 4 |
| 2 | (Bosnia and Herzegovina) (Estonia) | Aldin Šetkić; Mait Künnap | 6; 1 | 6; 4 |
| 3 | (Bosnia and Herzegovina) (Estonia) | Mirza Bašić / Tomislav Brkić; Mait Künnap / Jürgen Zopp | 7; 5 | 7^{7} 6^{2} |

=== Lithuania vs. Bosnia and Herzegovina ===
Lithuania
2
Master Class Tennis and Fitness Club, Yerevan, Armenia
9 May 2008
Clay

Bosnia and Herzegovina
1

| | | | 1 | 2 | 3 |
|---|---|---|---|---|---|
| 1 | (Lithuania) (Bosnia and Herzegovina) | Daniel Lencina-Ribes; Aleksandar Marić | 6; 4 | 3; 6 | 6; 4 |
| 2 | (Lithuania) (Bosnia and Herzegovina) | Gvidas Sabeckis; Aldin Šetkić | 6; 4 | 7; 5 |
| 3 | (Lithuania) (Bosnia and Herzegovina) | Daniel Lencina-Ribes / Gvidas Sabeckis; Mirza Bašić / Tomislav Brkić | 3; 6 | 7^{7} 6^{5} | 3; 6 |

=== Ghana vs. Estonia ===
Ghana
0
Master Class Tennis and Fitness Club, Yerevan, Armenia
9 May 2008
Clay

Estonia
3

| | | | 1 | 2 | 3 |
|---|---|---|---|---|---|
| 1 | (Ghana) (Estonia) | Menford Owusu; Jürgen Zopp | 2; 6 | 0; 6 |
| 2 | (Ghana) (Estonia) | Mohammed Salifu; Vladimir Ivanov | 4; 6 | 6; 4 | 2; 6 |
| 3 | (Ghana) (Estonia) | Emmanuel Mensah / Mohammed Salifu; Mikk Irdoja / Mait Künnap | 1; 6 | 2; 6 |

== Promotion pool ==
The top two teams from each of Pools A and B advanced to the Promotion pool. Results and points from games against the opponent from the preliminary round were carried forward.

(scores in italics carried over from Groups)

| | 1st–4th Play-off | MDA | LTU | NOR | BIH |
| 1 | Moldova (3–0) | | 3–0 | 2–1 | 3–0 |
| 2 | Lithuania (2–1) | 0–3 | | 2–1 | 2–1 |
| 3 | Norway (1–2) | 1–2 | 1–2 | | 2–1 |
| 4 | Bosnia and Herzegovina (0–3) | 0–3 | 1–2 | 1–2 | |

Moldova and Lithuania promoted to Group II for 2009.

=== Moldova vs. Bosnia and Herzegovina ===
Moldova
3
Master Class Tennis and Fitness Club, Yerevan, Armenia
10 May 2008
Clay

Bosnia and Herzegovina
0

| | | | 1 | 2 | 3 |
|---|---|---|---|---|---|
| 1 | (Moldova) (Bosnia and Herzegovina) | Andrei Gorban; Mirza Bašić | 6; 1 | 6; 0 |
| 2 | (Moldova) (Bosnia and Herzegovina) | Roman Borvanov; Aldin Šetkić | 6; 2 | 7; 5 |
| 3 | (Moldova) (Bosnia and Herzegovina) | Roman Borvanov / Andrei Ciumac; Mirza Bašić / Tomislav Brkić | 7^{7} 6^{4} | 2; 6 | 6; 3 |

=== Lithuania vs. Norway ===
Lithuania
2
Master Class Tennis and Fitness Club, Yerevan, Armenia
10 May 2008
Clay

Norway
1

| | | | 1 | 2 | 3 |
|---|---|---|---|---|---|
| 1 | (Lithuania) (Norway) | Daniel Lencina-Ribes; Philip Riise-Hansen | 7; 5 | 1; 6 | 7; 5 |
| 2 | (Lithuania) (Norway) | Gvidas Sabeckis; Stian Boretti | 3; 6 | 2; 6 |
| 3 | (Lithuania) (Norway) | Daniel Lencina-Ribes / Gvidas Sabeckis; Stian Boretti / Frederik Sletting-Johnsen | 6^{3} 7^{7} | 6; 3 | 7^{8} 6^{6} |

=== Moldova vs. Lithuania ===
Moldova
3
Master Class Tennis and Fitness Club, Yerevan, Armenia
11 May 2008
Clay

Lithuania
0

| | | | 1 | 2 | 3 |
|---|---|---|---|---|---|
| 1 | (Moldova) (Lithuania) | Radu Albot; Mindaugas Čeledinas | 6; 4 | 6; 2 |
| 2 | (Moldova) (Lithuania) | Andrei Gorban; Laurynas Grigelis | 6; 1 | 6; 2 |
| 3 | (Moldova) (Lithuania) | Radu Albot / Andrei Ciumac; Mindaugas Čeledinas / Laurynas Grigelis | 6; 3 | 6; 2 |

=== Bosnia and Herzegovina vs. Norway ===
Bosnia and Herzegovina
1
Master Class Tennis and Fitness Club, Yerevan, Armenia
11 May 2008
Clay

Norway
2

| | | | 1 | 2 | 3 |
|---|---|---|---|---|---|
| 1 | (Bosnia and Herzegovina) (Norway) | Tomislav Brkić; Philip Riise-Hansen | 4; 6 | 6; 4 | 2; 6 |
| 2 | (Bosnia and Herzegovina) (Norway) | Mirza Bašić; Stian Boretti | 5; 7 | 2; 6 |
| 3 | (Bosnia and Herzegovina) (Norway) | Mirza Bašić / Tomislav Brkić; Fredrik Ask / Frederik Sletting-Johnsen | 7^{7} 6^{3} | 6; 4 |

== Relegation pool ==
The bottom two teams from Pools A and B were placed in the relegation group. Results and points from games against the opponent from the preliminary round were carried forward.

(scores in italics carried over from Groups)

| | 5th–8th Play-off | EST | AND | ARM | GHA |
| 1 | Estonia (3–0) | | 3–0 | 3–0 | 3–0 |
| 2 | Andorra (1–2, 4R) | 0–3 | | 1–2 | 3–0 |
| 3 | Armenia (1–2, 3R) | 0–3 | 2–1 | | 1–2 |
| 4 | Ghana (1–2, 2R) | 0–3 | 0–3 | 2–1 | |

Note: Tie between Andorra, Armenia, and Ghana broken on number of rubbers won.

Armenia and Ghana relegated to Group IV for 2009.

=== Estonia vs. Andorra ===
Estonia
3
Master Class Tennis and Fitness Club, Yerevan, Armenia
10 May 2008
Clay

Andorra
0

| | | | 1 | 2 | 3 |
|---|---|---|---|---|---|
| 1 | (Estonia) (Andorra) | Jürgen Zopp; Jordi Vila-Vila | 6; 1 | 6; 4 |
| 2 | (Estonia) (Andorra) | Vladimir Ivanov; Jean-Baptiste Poux-Gautier | 7; 5 | 7; 5 |
| 3 | (Estonia) (Andorra) | Mikk Irdoja / Mait Künnap; Hector Hormigo-Herrera / Jean-Baptiste Poux-Gautier | 4; 6 | 6; 2 | 6; 2 |

=== Armenia vs. Ghana ===
Armenia
1
Master Class Tennis and Fitness Club, Yerevan, Armenia
10 May 2008
Clay

Ghana
2

| | | | 1 | 2 | 3 |
|---|---|---|---|---|---|
| 1 | (Armenia) (Ghana) | Roman Yedigaryan; Emmanuel Mensah | 4; 6 | 1; 6 |
| 2 | (Armenia) (Ghana) | Harutyun Sofyan; Mohammed Salifu | 7^{7} 6^{5} | 1; 6 | 2; 6 |
| 3 | (Armenia) (Ghana) | Hovhannes Davtyan / Hayk Zohranyan; Menford Owusu / Mohammed Salifu | 6; 1 | 6^{1} 7^{7} | 6; 4 |

=== Estonia vs. Armenia ===
Estonia
3
Master Class Tennis and Fitness Club, Yerevan, Armenia
11 May 2008
Clay

Armenia
0

| | | | 1 | 2 | 3 |
|---|---|---|---|---|---|
| 1 | (Estonia) (Armenia) | Jürgen Zopp; Hovhannes Davtyan | 7^{7} 6^{5} | 6; 4 |
| 2 | (Estonia) (Armenia) | Vladimir Ivanov; Harutyun Sofyan | 6; 1 | 6; 2 |
| 3 | (Estonia) (Armenia) | Mikk Irdoja / Mait Künnap; Hovhannes Davtyan / Hayk Zohranyan | 6; 2 | 6; 4 |

=== Andorra vs. Ghana ===
Andorra
3
Master Class Tennis and Fitness Club, Yerevan, Armenia
11 May 2008
Clay

Ghana
0

| | | | 1 | 2 | 3 |
|---|---|---|---|---|---|
| 1 | (Andorra) (Ghana) | Jordi Vila-Vila; Emmanuel Mensah | 6; 3 | 6; 2 |
| 2 | (Andorra) (Ghana) | Jean-Baptiste Poux-Gautier; Mohammed Salifu | 4; 6 | 6; 3 | 6; 3 |
| 3 | (Andorra) (Ghana) | Jean-Baptiste Poux-Gautier / Jordi Vila-Vila; Albert Arthur / Menford Owusu | 5; 7 | 6; 1 | 6; 4 |

== Final standings ==
| Rank | Team |
|---|---|
| 1 | Moldova |
| 2 | Lithuania |
| 3 | Norway |
| 4 | Bosnia and Herzegovina |
| 5 | Estonia |
| 6 | Andorra |
| 7 | Armenia |
| 8 | Ghana |

- Moldova and Lithuania promoted to Group II in 2009.
- Armenia and Ghana relegated to Group IV in 2009.

=== Group IV ===
- Venue: Master Class Tennis and Fitness Club, Yerevan, Armenia (clay)
- Date: 30 April–2 May
- Withdrawn: Libya, Malta and Mauritius

| | | ISL | NAM | SMR | RWA |
| 1 | Iceland (3–0) | | 3–0 | 2–1 | 3–0 |
| 2 | Namibia (2–1) | 0–3 | | 2–1 | 3–0 |
| 3 | San Marino (1–2) | 1–2 | 1–2 | | 3–0 |
| 4 | Rwanda (0–3) | 0–3 | 0–3 | 0–3 | |

- Iceland, Namibia, San Marino, and Rwanda promoted to Group III in 2009.

== See also ==
- 2008 Fed Cup – Women's
- 2008 Hopman Cup
