= Jesús Francisco Félix =

Dominican tennis player

- Country (sports): Dominican Republic
- Born: 9 April 1982 (age 42); Santo Domingo, Dominican Republic
- Plays: Right-handed, one-handed backhand
- Prize money: $2,257

Singles
- Career record: 2–3 (at ATP Tour level, Grand Slam level, and in Davis Cup)
- Career titles: 0
- Highest ranking: No. 1715 (8 December 2014)

Doubles
- Career record: 0–0 (at ATP Tour level, Grand Slam level, and in Davis Cup)
- Career titles: 0
- Last updated on: 17 January 2021.

Jesús Francisco Félix (born 9 April 1982) is a Dominican tennis player.

Francisco Félix has a career high ATP singles ranking of 1715 achieved on 8 December 2014.

Francisco Félix has a career-high ITF juniors ranking of 511, achieved on 3 January 2000.

Francisco Félix represented Dominican Republic at the 2006, 2009, and the 2010 Davis Cup, where he has a W/L record of 2–3.

== Davis Cup ==
=== Participations: (2–3) ===
Group membership World Group (0–0) WG Play-off (0–0) Group I (0–1) Group II (2–2) Group III (0–0) Group IV (0–0)	Matches by surface Hard (0–2) Clay (2–1) Grass (0–0) Carpet (0–0)	Matches by type Singles (2–3) Doubles (0–0)

- ▲ ▼ indicates the outcome of the Davis Cup match followed by the score, date, place of event, the zonal classification and its phase, and the court surface.
