= Groot Kwartier =

Groot Kwartier Emmastad
- Neighbourhood
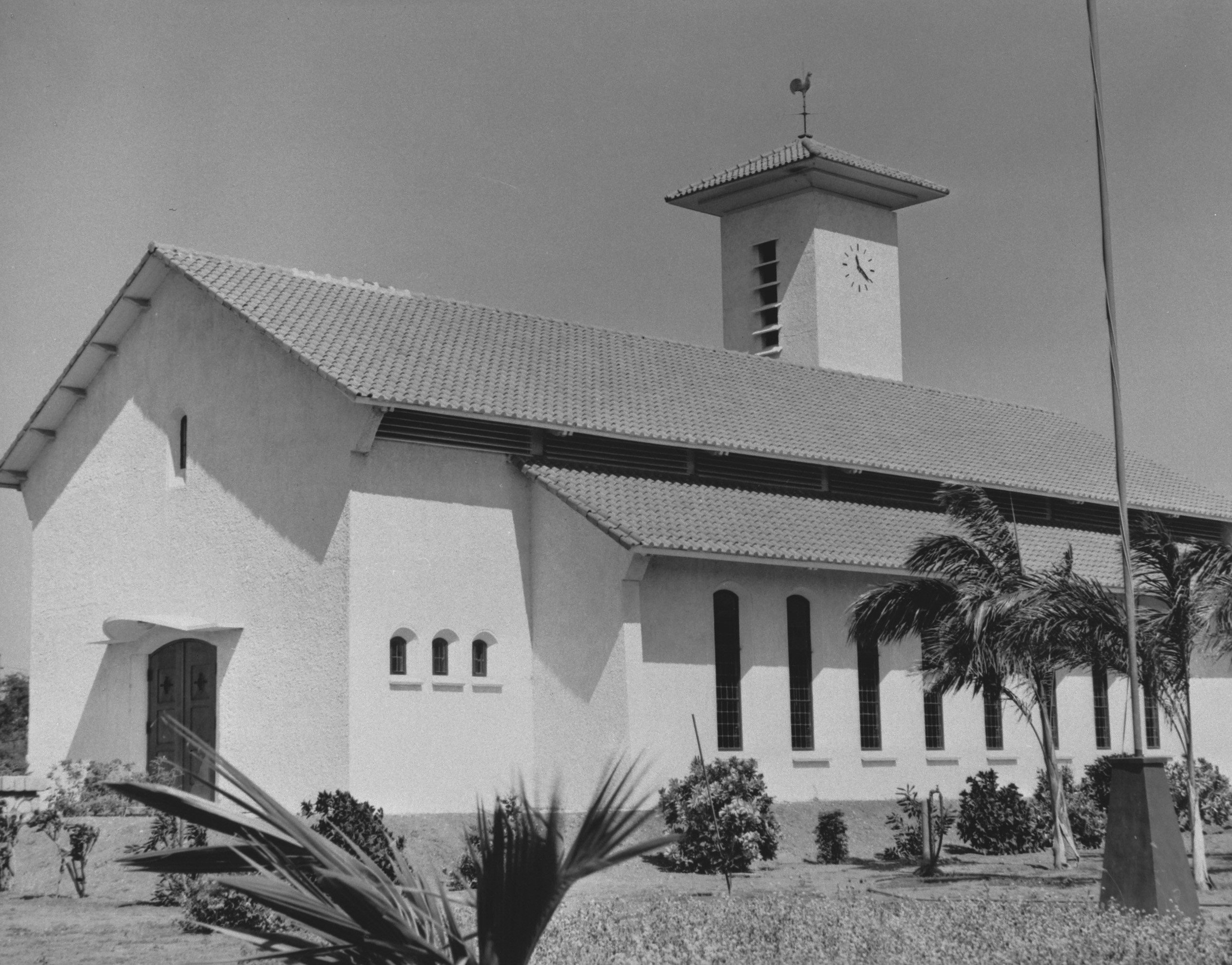
- Church in Emmastad (1940s)

- Location in Curaçao
- Coordinates: 12.1365°N 68.9138°W
- State: Kingdom of the Netherlands
- Country: Curaçao
- City: Willemstad

Area
  - Total: 2.42 km^{2} (0.93 sq mi)

Population (2011)
  - Total: 2,611
  - Density: 1,080/km^{2} (2,790/sq mi)

Groot Kwartier is a neighbourhood of Willemstad, Curaçao, a Lesser Antilles island in the Dutch Caribbean. It is better known as Emmastad, a villa ward built by Royal Dutch Shell for its employees. Emmastad is officially part of Groot Kwartier.

== History ==
Groot Kwartier started as a plantation in 1694. The plantation produced bananas, divi-divi and livestock, but was mainly known for its large fresh water supply. In 1915, the nearby plantation Asiento was bought by Royal Dutch Shell. Initially the grounds were used as a harbour. In 1923, neighbourhoods were built on Groot Kwartier to house employees hired from other Caribbean islands. In 1929, the area owned by Shell was renamed Emmastad.

Between 1945 and 1955, Emmastad was enlarged with residential neighbourhoods for the Dutch employees of Royal Dutch Shell. The houses constructed during that period were luxurious, free-standing villas. Emmastad was a segregated and gated community where blacks and coloureds were only allowed entry with a special pass. In the 1960s, Shell started selling the houses. Emmastad is no longer segregated, and has become a popular neighbourhood for the middle class; however, the older parts of Groot Kwartier are poorer.

== Bibliography ==
- Buurtprofiel Groot Kwartier (2011). "Buurtprofiel Groot Kwartier" (PDF). Government of Curaçao (in Dutch).
